= Boise State Broncos men's basketball statistical leaders =

Men's basketball

The Boise State Broncos men's basketball statistical leaders are individual statistical leaders of the Boise State Broncos men's basketball program in various categories, including points, assists, blocks, rebounds, and steals. Within those areas, the lists identify single-game, single-season, and career leaders. The Broncos represent Boise State University in the NCAA's Pac-12 Conference.

Boise State began competing in intercollegiate basketball in 1968.

The NCAA did not officially record assists as a stat until the 1983–84 season, and blocks and steals until the 1985–86 season, but Boise State's record books includes players in these stats before these seasons. These lists are updated through the end of the 2021–22 season.

== Scoring ==
Career
Rk	Player	Points	Seasons
1	Tyson Degenhart	2037	2021–22 2022–23 2023–24 2024–25
2	Tanoka Beard	1944	1989–90 1990–91 1991–92 1992–93
3	Anthony Drmic	1942	2011–12 2012–13 2013–14 2014–15 2015–16
4	Steve Connor	1927	1974–75 1975–76 1976–77 1977–78
5	Derrick Marks	1912	2011–12 2012–13 2013–14 2014–15
6	Coby Karl	1698	2003–04 2004–05 2005–06 2006–07
7	Abe Jackson	1660	1998–99 1999–2000 2000–01 2001–02
8	Chris Childs	1602	1985–86 1986–87 1987–88 1988–89
9	Justinian Jessup	1583	2016–17 2017–18 2018–19 2019–20
10	Roberto Bergersen	1485	1996–97 1997–98 1998–99

Season
Rk	Player	Points	Season
1	Tyson Degenhart	676	2024–25
2	Reggie Larry	661	2007–08
3	Roberto Bergersen	644	1998–99
4	Ron Austin	636	1970–71
5	Derrick Marks	621	2014–15
6	Chandler Hutchison	619	2017–18
7	Roberto Bergersen	582	1997–98
8	Tanoka Beard	566	1992–93
9	Anthony Drmic	565	2012–13
10	Abe Jackson	557	2001–02
	Chandler Hutchison	557	2016–17

Single game
Rk	Player	Points	Season	Opponent
1	Chandler Hutchison	44	2017–18	San Diego State
2	Derrick Marks	39	2013–14	Idaho
	Chandler Hutchison	39	2017–18	Washington
4	Derrick Marks	38	2013–14	Colorado State
5	Robert Arnold	35	2009–10	New Mexico State
	Derrick Marks	35	2012–13	Creighton
	Max Rice	35	2023–24	New Mexico
8	Anthony Drmic	34	2012–13	LSU
	Anthony Drmic	34	2013–14	Texas–Arlington
	Chandler Hutchison	34	2016–17	Utah

== Rebounds ==
Career
Rk	Player	Rebounds	Seasons
1	Jason Ellis	948	2001–02 2002–03 2003–04 2004–05
2	Ryan Watkins	814	2010–11 2011–12 2012–13 2013–14
3	Bruce Bolden	767	1981–82 1982–83 1983–84 1984–85
4	Tyson Degenhart	738	2021–22 2022–23 2023–24 2024–25
5	Trent Johnson	702	1974–75 1975–76 1976–77 1977–78
6	Chandler Hutchison	672	2014–15 2015–16 2016–17 2017–18
7	Tanoka Beard	670	1989–90 1990–91 1991–92 1992–93
8	Pat Hoke	611	1972–73 1973–74 1974–75 1975–76
9	Anthony Drmic	606	2011–12 2012–13 2013–14 2014–15 2015–16
10	Greg Bunn	588	1970–71 1971–72 1972–73

Season
Rk	Player	Rebounds	Season
1	Ryan Watkins	361	2013–14
2	Reggie Larry	313	2007–08
3	Jason Ellis	297	2003–04
4	Steve Wallace	287	1971–72
5	Roderick Williams	284	2019–20
6	James Webb III	283	2015–16
7	Mladen Armus	279	2021–22
8	Matt Nelson	275	2006–07
9	James Webb III	257	2014–15
10	Steve Wallace	256	1970–71

Single game
Rk	Player	Rebounds	Season	Opponent
1	Ryan Watkins	22	2013–14	New Mexico
2	Jason Ellis	21	2004–05	Tulsa
3	Mladen Armus	19	2021–22	Utah State
4	Reggie Larry	18	2006–07	Idaho
	Ryan Watkins	18	2012–13	Fresno State
	James Webb III	18	2015–16	San Jose State
	Chandler Hutchison	18	2017–18	Illinois State
8	Jason Ellis	17	2004–05	Fresno State
	Tezarray Banks	17	2005–06	Fresno State
	Ike Okoye	17	2009–10	Eastern Washington
	Ryan Watkins	17	2012–13	LSU
	Ryan Watkins	17	2013–14	Fresno State
	Roderick Williams	17	2019–20	New Mexico

== Assists ==
Career
Rk	Player	Assists	Seasons
1	Anthony Thomas	463	2006–07 2007–08 2008–09 2009–10
2	Coby Karl	408	2003–04 2004–05 2005–06 2006–07
3	Chris Childs	392	1985–86 1986–87 1987–88 1988–89
4	Steve Connor	385	1974–75 1975–76 1976–77 1977–78
5	Derrick Marks	370	2011–12 2012–13 2013–14 2014–15
6	La'Shard Anderson	367	2008–09 2009–10 2010–11
7	Gerry Washington	347	1995–96 1996–97 1997–98 1998–99
8	Joe Skiffer	339	1999–2000 2000–01 2001–02 2002–03 2003–04
9	Bryan Defares	298	2000–01 2001–02 2002–03 2003–04
	Mikey Thompson	298	2012–13 2013–14 2014–15 2015–16

Season
Rk	Player	Assists	Season
1	Alvaro Cardenas	256	2024–25
2	La'Shard Anderson	165	2010–11
3	Anthony Thomas	151	2008–09
4	Steve Connor	145	1976–77
	Doug Usitalo	145	1987–88
6	Anthony Thomas	141	2007–08
7	Frank Jackson	135	1984–85
8	Doug Usitalo	130	1986–87
9	Coby Karl	129	2004–05
10	Rodger Bates	128	1980–81

Single game
Rk	Player	Assists	Season	Opponent
1	Alvaro Cardenas	12	2024–25	Air Force
	Alvaro Cardenas	12	2024–25	New Mexico
3	Anthony Thomas	11	2008–09	Pacific (OR)
4	Anthony Thomas	10	2008–09	Louisiana Tech
	Mikey Thompson	10	2015–16	New Mexico
	Chandler Hutchison	10	2017–18	Portland
	Alvaro Cardenas	10	2024–25	Utah Tech
	Alvaro Cardenas	10	2024–25	San Jose State
	Alvaro Cardenas	10	2024–25	New Mexico
10	Matt Bauscher	9	2005–06	New Mexico State
	Anthony Thomas	9	2006–07	Nevada
	Tyler Tiedeman	9	2007–08	Montana Tech
	La'Shard Anderson	9	2010–11	Portland
	La'Shard Anderson	9	2010–11	UC Santa Barbara
	La'Shard Anderson	9	2010–11	New Mexico State
	Westly Perryman	9	2011–12	Idaho
	Derrick Marks	9	2012–13	Walla Walla
	Derrick Marks	9	2012–13	Air Force
	Mikey Thompson	9	2015–16	Colorado State
	Paris Austin	9	2016–17	Nevada
	Emmanuel Akot	9	2020–21	SMU
	Marcus Shaver Jr.	9	2022–23	Wyoming
	Alvaro Cardenas	9	2024–25	UNLV
	Alvaro Cardenas	9	2024–25	San Jose State
	Alvaro Cardenas	9	2024–25	Nevada
	Alvaro Cardenas	9	2024–25	Nebraska
	Dylan Andrews	9	2025–26	Hawai'i Pacific

== Steals ==
Career
Rk	Player	Steals	Seasons
1	Chris Childs	215	1985–86 1986–87 1987–88 1988–89
2	La'Shard Anderson	196	2008–09 2009–10 2010–11
3	Derrick Marks	190	2011–12 2012–13 2013–14 2014–15
4	Doug Usitalo	185	1986–87 1987–88
5	Anthony Thomas	179	2006–07 2007–08 2008–09 2009–10
	Gerry Washington	179	1995–96 1996–97 1997–98 1998–99
7	Justinian Jessup	154	2016–17 2017–18 2018–19 2019–20
8	Mike Tolman	145	1992–93 1995–96 1996–97 1997–98
9	Roberto Bergersen	138	1996–97 1997–98 1998–99
10	Damon Archibald	129	1992–93 1993–94 1994–95

Season
Rk	Player	Steals	Season
1	Doug Usitalo	105	1986–87
2	La'Shard Anderson	83	2009–10
3	Doug Usitalo	80	1987–88
4	La'Shard Anderson	77	2010–11
5	Rawn Hayes	72	1982–83
6	Chris Childs	68	1986–87
7	Derrick Marks	59	2014–15
8	Chris Childs	58	1987–88
9	Bernard Walker	57	1993–94
10	Chris Childs	56	1985–86
	Darnell Woods	56	1992–93
	Derrick Marks	56	2012–13

Single game
Rk	Player	Steals	Season	Opponent
1	La'Shard Anderson	6	2009–10	New Mexico State
	Anthony Thomas	6	2009–10	Nevada
	Westly Perryman	6	2010–11	Northern Illinois
	La'Shard Anderson	6	2010–11	Utah State
	La'Shard Anderson	6	2010–11	Nevada
	Derrick Marks	6	2012–13	Seattle
	Pearson Carmichael	6	2024–25	George Washington
8	Seth Robinson	5	2004–05	Rice
	Anthony Thomas	5	2006–07	Hawaii
	Matt Nelson	5	2006–07	Hawaii
	Reggie Larry	5	2007–08	Utah Valley
	Anthony Thomas	5	2007–08	Washington State
	Anthony Thomas	5	2007–08	Utah Valley
	La'Shard Anderson	5	2009–10	Northwest Nazarene
	La'Shard Anderson	5	2009–10	Hawaii
	Daequon Montreal	5	2009–10	Idaho
	La'Shard Anderson	5	2009–10	New Mexico State
	La'Shard Anderson	5	2009–10	San Jose State
	La'Shard Anderson	5	2010–11	Long Beach State
	Anthony Drmic	5	2011–12	Northern Illinois
	Anthony Drmic	5	2013–14	Simpson (CA)
	Mikey Thompson	5	2013–14	Seattle
	Derrick Marks	5	2013–14	Saint Mary's
	James Webb III	5	2014–15	Air Force
	Mikey Thompson	5	2015–16	New Mexico State
	Roderick Williams	5	2018–19	Grand Canyon
	Abu Kigab	5	2021–22	San Jose State
	Max Rice	5	2022–23	South Dakota State
	Alvaro Cardenas	5	2024–25	New Mexico

== Blocks ==
Career
Rk	Player	Blocks	Seasons
1	Tanoka Beard	160	1989–90 1990–91 1991–92 1992–93
2	John Coker	156	1991–92 1992–93 1993–94 1994–95
3	Trever Tillman	126	1997–98 1998–99 2000–01 2001–02
4	Ike Okoye	106	2008–09 2009–10
5	Jason Ellis	103	2001–02 2002–03 2003–04 2004–05
6	Dave Richardson	86	1977–78 1978–79 1979–80
7	Reggie Larry	79	2006–07 2007–08
8	Bruce Bolden	69	1981–82 1982–83 1983–84 1984–85
	Jeff Kelley	69	1983–84 1984–85 1985–86 1986–87
	Ryan Watkins	69	2010–11 2011–12 2012–13 2013–14

Season
Rk	Player	Blocks	Season
1	John Coker	77	1993–94
2	Ike Okoye	60	2008–09
3	Dave Richardson	53	1978–79
4	Bernard Walker	51	1993–94
5	Tanoka Beard	50	1990–91
6	John Coker	49	1994–95
7	Ike Okoye	46	2009–10
8	Reggie Larry	44	2006–07
9	Tanoka Beard	41	1991–92
10	Billy Fikes	38	1991–92
	Tanoka Beard	38	1992–93
	Trever Tillman	38	1997–98
	Trever Tillman	38	2000–01
	O'mar Stanley	38	2023–24

Single game
Rk	Player	Blocks	Season	Opponent
1	Ike Okoye	6	2008–09	Utah State
	Ike Okoye	6	2009–10	Eastern Washington
	Naje Smith	6	2022–23	UNLV
4	Reggie Larry	5	2006–07	San Jose State
	Abu Kigab	5	2020–21	Wyoming
	Mladen Armus	5	2020–21	Fresno State
7	Reggie Larry	4	2006–07	Idaho
	Reggie Larry	4	2007–08	Utah State
	Ike Okoye	4	2008–09	Wyoming
	Ike Okoye	4	2008–09	Hawaii
	Ike Okoye	4	2008–09	San Jose State
	Ike Okoye	4	2009–10	Wyoming
	Ike Okoye	4	2009–10	Idaho State
	Ike Okoye	4	2009–10	Nevada
	Robert Arnold	4	2009–10	San Jose State
	Ryan Watkins	4	2013–14	Saint Mary's
	Ryan Watkins	4	2013–14	Air Force
	Ryan Watkins	4	2013–14	San Jose State
	Abu Kigab	4	2020–21	Colorado State
	Mladen Armus	4	2021–22	Saint Louis
	O'Mar Stanley	4	2024–25	Corban College
	O'Mar Stanley	4	2024–25	New Mexico
