= List of Boise State Broncos men's basketball seasons =

This is a list of seasons completed by the Boise State Broncos men's college basketball team. Boise State joined the NCAA in 1968 when they began to compete as a four-year school. They have only ever had one season where they did not reach double digits in wins.

== Seasons ==
Statistics overview
Season	Team	Overall	Conference	Standing	Postseason
Murray Satterfield (Independent) (1968–1970)
1968–69	Murray Satterfield	19–8			
1969–70	Murray Satterfield	20–8			NCAA College Division first round
Murray Satterfield (Big Sky Conference) (1970–1973)
1970–71	Murray Satterfield	10–16	5–9	7th	
1971–72	Murray Satterfield	14–12	7–7	T–5th	
1972–73	Murray Satterfield; Bus Connor	11–15^{[Note A]}	5–9^{[Note A]}	6th	
Murray Satterfield:		69–52 (.570)	12–18 (.400)		
Bus Connor (Big Sky Conference) (1973–1980)
1973–74	Bus Connor	12–14	6–8	6th	
1974–75	Bus Connor	13–13	7–7	T–3rd	
1975–76	Bus Connor	18–11	9–5	T–1st	NCAA Division I first round
1976–77	Bus Connor	10–16	5–9	T–6th	
1977–78	Bus Connor	13–14	8–6	4th	
1978–79	Bus Connor	11–15	6–8	T–6th	
1979–80	Bus Connor	10–16	4–10	8th	
Bus Connor:		92–106 (.465)	50–60 (.455)		
Dave Leach (Big Sky Conference) (1980–1983)
1980–81	Dave Leach	7–19	4–10	7th	
1981–82	Dave Leach	11–15	6–8	T–4th	
1982–83	Dave Leach	10–17	5–9	6th	
Dave Leach:		28–51 (.354)	15–27 (.357)		
Bobby Dye (Big Sky Conference) (1983–1995)
1983–84	Bobby Dye	15–13	6–8	T–5th	
1984–85	Bobby Dye	15–14	5–9	T–6th	
1985–86	Bobby Dye	12–16	6–8	T–6th	
1986–87	Bobby Dye	22–8	10–4	2nd	NIT second round
1987–88	Bobby Dye	24–6	13–3	1st	NCAA Division I first round
1988–89	Bobby Dye	23–7	13–3	T–1st	NIT first round
1989–90	Bobby Dye	12–15	7–9	7th	
1990–91	Bobby Dye	18–11	10–6	4th	NIT first round
1991–92	Bobby Dye	16–13	7–9	5th	
1992–93	Bobby Dye	21–8	10–4	T–2nd	NCAA Division I first round
1993–94	Bobby Dye	17–13	7–7	5th	NCAA Division I first round
1994–95	Bobby Dye	17–10	7–7	T–4th	
Bobby Dye:		212–134 (.613)	101–77 (.567)		
Rod Jensen (Big Sky Conference) (1995–1996)
1995–96	Rod Jensen	15–13	10–4	T–2nd	
Rod Jensen (Big West Conference) (1996–2001)
1996–97	Rod Jensen	14–13	9–7	4th	
1997–98	Rod Jensen	17–13	9–7	T–3rd (East)	
1998–99	Rod Jensen	21–8	12–4	T–1st (East)	
1999–00	Rod Jensen	12–15	6–10	T–3rd (East)	
2000–01	Rod Jensen	17–14	8–8	T–5th	
Rod Jensen (Western Athletic Conference) (2001–2002)
2001–02	Rod Jensen	13–17	6–12	7th	
Rod Jensen:		109–93 (.540)	60–52 (.536)		
Greg Graham (Western Athletic Conference) (2002–2010)
2002–03	Greg Graham	13–16	7–11	8th	
2003–04	Greg Graham	23–10	12–6	T–3rd	NIT second round
2004–05	Greg Graham	16–18	6–12	8th	
2005–06	Greg Graham	14–15	6–10	7th	
2006–07	Greg Graham	17–14	8–8	T–5th	
2007–08	Greg Graham	25–9	12–4	T–1st	NCAA Division I first round
2008–09	Greg Graham	19–13	9–7	T–3rd	CBI first round
2009–10	Greg Graham	15–17	5–11	8th	
Greg Graham:		142–112 (.559)	(65–69 (.485)		
Leon Rice (Western Athletic Conference) (2010–2011)
2010–11	Leon Rice	22–13	10–6	2nd	CBI Semifinal
Leon Rice (Mountain West Conference) (2011–Present)
2011–12	Leon Rice	13–17	3–11	T–7th	
2012–13	Leon Rice	21–11	9–7	T–4th	NCAA Division I First Four
2013–14	Leon Rice	21–13	9–9	T–5th	
2014–15	Leon Rice	25–9	14–4	T–1st	NCAA Division I First Four
2015–16	Leon Rice	20–12	11–7	3rd	
2016–17	Leon Rice	20–12	12–6	3rd	NIT second round
2017–18	Leon Rice	23–9	13–5	2nd	NIT first round
2018–19	Leon Rice	13–20	7–11	T–7th	
2019–20	Leon Rice	20–12	11–7	T–5th	No postseason held
2020–21	Leon Rice	19–9	14–6	4th	NIT Quarterfinal
2021–22	Leon Rice	27–8	15–3	1st	NCAA Division I Round of 64
2022–23	Leon Rice	24–10	13–5	T–2nd	NCAA Division I Round of 64
2023–24	Leon Rice	22–11	13–5	T–2nd	NCAA Division I First Four
2024–25	Leon Rice	26–11	14–6	T–4th	CBC Semifinals
2025–26	Leon Rice	20–12	12–8	T–5th	
Leon Rice:		336–189 (.640)	180–106 (.629)		
Total:		990–737 (.573)			
National champion Postseason invitational champion Conference regular season champion Conference regular season and conference tournament champion Division regular season champion Division regular season and conference tournament champion Conference tournament champion

^A. The first University Division (Division I) head coach was Murray Satterfield, who abruptly resigned during his eighth season on January 16, 1973. Satterfield went 6–8 and 0–2 in conference; his replacement, Bus Connor, went 5–7.
