= Idaho State Bengals men's basketball statistical leaders =

The Idaho State Bengals men's basketball statistical leaders are individual statistical leaders of the Idaho State Bengals men's basketball program in various categories, including points, rebounds, assists, steals, and blocks. Within those areas, the lists identify single-game, single-season, and career leaders. The Bengals represent the Idaho State University in the NCAA's Big Sky Conference.

Idaho State began competing in intercollegiate basketball in 1926. However, the school's record book does not generally list records from before the 1950s, as records from before this period are often incomplete and inconsistent. Since scoring was much lower in this era, and teams played much fewer games during a typical season, it is likely that few or no players from this era would appear on these lists anyway.

The NCAA did not officially record assists as a stat until the 1983–84 season, and blocks and steals until the 1985–86 season, but Idaho State's record books includes players in these stats before these seasons. These lists are updated through the end of the 2020–21 season.

== Scoring ==
Career
Rank	Player	Points	Seasons
1	Les Roh	1964	1952–53 1953–54 1954–55 1955–56
2	Steve Hayes	1933	1973–74 1974–75 1975–76 1976–77
3	Donn Holston	1819	1982–83 1983–84 1984–85 1985–86 1986–87
4	Jim Potter	1810	1991–92 1992–93 1993–94 1994–95
5	Arthur Crump	1557	1961–62 1962–63 1963–64
6	Willie Humes	1510	1969–70 1970–71
7	Lloyd Harris	1489	1955–56 1956–57 1957–58
8	Lawrence Butler	1420	1977–78 1978–79
9	Chris Hansen	1355	2012–13 2013–14 2014–15
10	Brayden Parker	1325	2020–21 2021–22 2022–23 2023–24

Season
Rank	Player	Points	Season
1	Dave Wagnon	845	1965–66
2	Lawrence Butler	812	1978–79
3	Willie Humes	777	1970–71
4	Willie Humes	733	1969–70
5	Ethan Telfair	626	2015–16
6	Lawrence Butler	608	1977–78
7	Steve Hayes	605	1976–77
8	Nelson Peterson	603	1984–85
9	Arthur Crump	595	1962–63
10	Donn Holston	584	1986–87

Single game
Rank	Player	Points	Season	Opponent
1	Willie Humes	53	1970–71	Montana State
2	Willie Humes	51	1970–71	Northern Arizona
	Willie Humes	51	1969–70	Boise State
4	Willie Humes	49	1970–71	Montana
5	Willie Humes	48	1969–70	Montana State
6	Dave Wagnon	47	1965–66	Weber State
	Dave Wagnon	47	1965–66	Idaho
8	Steve Hayes	46	1974–75	Loyola
	Willie Humes	46	1970–71	Hardin-Simmons
10	Willie Humes	45	1969–70	Montana

== Rebounds ==
Career
Rank	Player	Rebounds	Seasons
1	Steve Hayes	1147	1973–74 1974–75 1975–76 1976–77
2	Jim Potter	863	1991–92 1992–93 1993–94 1994–95
3	Arthur Crump	834	1961–62 1962–63 1963–64
4	Jeff Cook	720	1974–75 1975–76 1976–77 1977–78
5	Ed Wilson	672	1966–67 1967–68
6	DeWayne Cruse	657	1962–63 1963–64 1964–65
7	Homer Watkins	605	1958–59 1959–60
8	Nate Green	573	1993–94 1994–95 1995–96 1996–97
9	Brayden Parker	554	2020–21 2021–22 2022–23 2023–24
10	Jeffrey Solarin	507	2013–14 2014–15

Season
Rank	Player	Rebounds	Season
1	Ed Wilson	420	1967–68
2	Steve Hayes	346	1974–75
3	Arthur Crump	344	1962–63
4	Jack Allain	333	1956–57
5	Steve Hayes	332	1976–77
6	Homer Watkins	324	1958–59
7	Jeff Cook	302	1977–78
8	Arthur Crump	294	1963–64
9	Steve Hayes	286	1975–76
10	Edison Hicks	285	1971–72

Single game
Rank	Player	Rebounds	Season	Opponent
1	Ed Wilson	30	1967–68	Texas Pan American
2	Ed Wilson	26	1967–68	Arkansas
3	Ed Wilson	25	1967–68	Montana State
	Ed Wilson	25	1967–68	Xavier
5	Ed Wilson	24	1967–68	Montana State
	Ed Wilson	24	1967–68	NAU
7	Steve Hayes	23	1974–75	Gonzaga
8	Steve Hayes	22	1974–75	Weber State
	Edison Hicks	22	1971–72	NAU
	Ed Wilson	22	1967–68	Idaho

== Assists ==
Career
Rank	Player	Assists	Seasons
1	Tyrone Buckmon	349	1990–91 1991–92
2	Ethan Telfair	303	2015–16 2016–17
3	Terry Goddard	298	1980–81 1981–82
4	Matt Stucki	297	2005–06 2006–07 2007–08 2008–09
5	Marquis Poole	290	2002–03 2003–04
6	Tony Malveaux	281	1982–83 1983–84
7	Mike Graefe	271	1984–85 1985–86
8	Amorrow Morgan	265	2006–07 2007–08 2008–09 2009–10
9	Scott Roberts	262	1988–89 1989–90 1990–91 1991–92
10	Scott Goold	260	1975–76 1976–77 1977–78 1979–80

Season
Rank	Player	Assists	Season
1	Tyrone Buckmon	195	1990–91
2	Terry Goddard	173	1980–81
3	Ethan Telfair	167	2015–16
	Marquis Poole	167	2003–04
5	Maleek Arington	164	2023–24
6	Dylan Darling	160	2024–25
7	Tony Malveaux	156	1983–84
8	Jordie McTavish	155	2000–01
9	Tyrone Buckmon	154	1991–92
10	Mike Graefe	149	1985–86
	Erin Cowan	149	1992–93

Single game
Rank	Player	Assists	Season	Opponent
1	Tyrone Buckmon	17	1990–91	Weber State
2	Tyrone Buckmon	15	1990–91	NAU
3	Jeff Gardner	14	2004–05	Montana Tech
	Stephen Brown	14	1998–99	Cal State Northridge
	Terry Goddard	14	1980–81	Boise State
	George Rodriguez	14	1974–75	San Diego State
7	Tyrone Buckmon	13	1990–91	Eastern Washington
	Craig Murray	13	1989–90	Montana State
	Mike Graefe	13	1985–86	Idaho
	Dylan Darling	13	2024–25	Portland State

== Steals ==
Career
Rank	Player	Steals	Seasons
1	Geno Luzcando	220	2014–15 2015–16 2016–17 2017–18
2	Jim Rhode	189	1985–86 1986–87 1987–88 1988–89
3	Ron Harwell	156	1993–94 1994–95 1995–96 1996–97
4	Ethan Telfair	130	2015–16 2016–17
5	Nate Green	128	1993–94 1994–95 1995–96 1996–97
6	Tyrone Buckmon	118	1990–91 1991–92
	Maleek Arington	118	2022–23 2023–24
8	Brandon Boyd	117	2015–16 2016–17 2017–18 2018–19
9	Matt Stucki	115	2005–06 2006–07 2007–08 2008–09
10	Jim Potter	110	1991–92 1992–93 1993–94 1994–95

Season
Rank	Player	Steals	Season
1	Jim Rhode	82	1988–89
2	Maleek Arington	79	2023–24
3	Ethan Telfair	74	2015–16
4	Jim Rhode	68	1987–88
5	Geno Luzcando	64	2016–17
	Terance Fleming	64	1993–94
7	Tyrone Buckmon	61	1990–91
	Geno Luzcando	61	2015–16
9	Jeff Gardner	60	2003–04
	Ron Harwell	60	1996–97

Single game
Rank	Player	Steals	Season	Opponent
1	Greg Griffin	9	1976–77	Wyoming
2	Jim Rhode	8	1988–89	Rocky Mountain
3	Geno Luzcando	7	2016–17	Portland State
	Geno Luzcando	7	2016–17	Eastern Kentucky
	Jim Rhode	7	1988–89	Montana State
	Terry Goddard	7	1981–82	Nevada
	Ed Thompson	7	1976–77	Wyoming
	Ed Thompson	7	1976–77	Fresno State

== Blocks ==
Career
Rank	Player	Blocks	Seasons
1	Steve Hayes	207	1973–74 1974–75 1975–76 1976–77
2	Slim Millien	129	2004–05 2005–06
3	Evan Otten	124	2024–25 2025–26
4	Brayden Parker	121	2020–21 2021–22 2022–23 2023–24
5	Nate Green	114	1993–94 1994–95 1995–96 1996–97
6	Jeff Cook	99	1974–75 1975–76 1976–77 1977–78
7	Jesse Smith	93	2001–02 2002–03 2003–04 2004–05
8	Deividas Busma	87	2008–09 2009–10 2010–11
9	Jim Potter	85	1991–92 1992–93 1993–94 1994–95
10	Mike Williams	74	1982–83 1983–84

Season
Rank	Player	Blocks	Season
1	Slim Millien	93	2005–06
2	Steve Hayes	76	1975–76
3	Steve Hayes	74	1974–75
4	Evan Otten	66	2024–25
5	Evan Otten	58	2025–26
6	Steve Hayes	57	1976–77
7	Jeff Cook	47	1977–78
	Brayden Parker	47	2023–24
9	Mike Williams	45	1983–84
10	Kelvin Jones	44	2018–19

Single game
Rank	Player	Blocks	Season	Opponent
1	Steve Hayes	10	1975–76	Weber State
2	Slim Millien	8	2005–06	Weber State
	Deividas Busma	8	2010–11	Montana State
4	Slim Millien	7	2005–06	Montana
5	Novak Topalovic	6	2016–17	Utah Valley
	John Ofoegbu	6	2006–07	NAU
	Slim Millien	6	2005–06	Eastern Washington
	Slim Millien	6	2005–06	South Dakota State
	Slim Millien	6	2005–06	Rocky Mountain
	Steve Hayes	6	1974–75	Denver
	Deividas Busma	6	2008–09	Sacramento State
