= 1970–71 Boise State Broncos men's basketball team =

American college basketball season

1970–71 Boise State Broncos men's basketball
- Conference: Big Sky Conference
- Record: 10–16 (5–9 Big Sky)
- Head coach: Murray Satterfield (6th season)
- Assistant coach: Bus Connor
- Home arena: Bronco Gymnasium

1970–71 Big Sky men's basketball standings
	Conf.				Overall
Team	W		L	PCT	W		L	PCT
Weber State	12	–	2	.857	21	–	6	.778
Idaho	8	–	6	.571	14	–	11	.560
Montana State	8	–	6	.571	10	–	13	.435
Idaho State	7	–	7	.500	9	–	15	.375
Gonzaga	6	–	8	.429	12	–	13	.480
Montana	6	–	8	.429	8	–	16	.333
Boise State	5	–	9	.357	10	–	16	.385
Northern Arizona	4	–	10	.286	6	–	19	.240

The 1970–71 Boise State Broncos men's basketball team represented Boise State College during the 1970–71 NCAA University Division basketball season. The Broncos were led by sixth-year head coach Murray Satterfield, and played their home games on campus at Bronco Gymnasium in Boise, Idaho.

They finished the regular season at 10–16 overall, with a 5–9 record in the Big Sky Conference, seventh in the standings. This was their first season in the Big Sky and the University Division.

No Broncos were named to the all-conference team; senior forward Ron Austin was on the second team.

There was no conference tournament, which debuted five years later in 1976.
