= Jim Jarvis =

American basketball player and coach (born 1943)

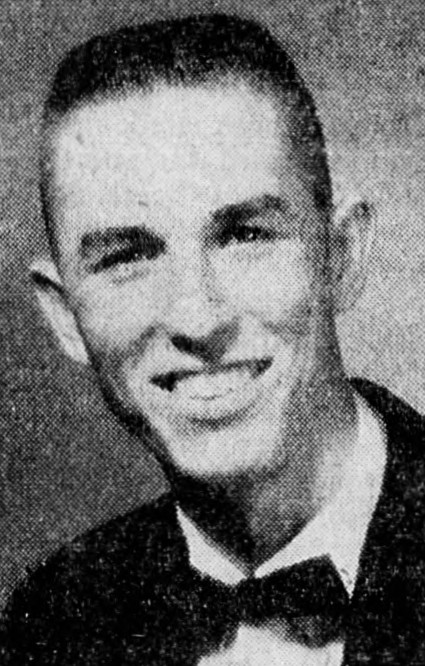

Personal information
- Born: March 3, 1943 (age 83) Caldwell, Idaho, U.S.
- Listed height: 6 ft 1 in (1.85 m)
- Listed weight: 175 lb (79 kg)

Career information
- High school: Roseburg (Roseburg, Oregon)
- College: Oregon State (1962–1965)
- NBA draft: 1965: 6th round, 45th overall pick
- Drafted by: San Francisco Warriors
- Position: Point guard
- Number: 20
- Coaching career: 1971–1978

Career history

Playing
- 1967–1968: Pittsburgh/Minnesota Pipers
- 1968–1969: Los Angeles Stars

Coaching
- 1971–1974: Spokane Falls CC
- 1974–1978: Idaho

Career highlights
- ABA champion (1968); First-team All-AAWU (1965); First-team Parade All-American (1961)
- Stats at Basketball Reference

Career coaching record
- College: 26–78 (.250)

James C. Jarvis (born March 3, 1943) is an American former basketball player and coach. He played professionally in the American Basketball Association (ABA) and later coached at the NCAA Division I level for the University of Idaho.

== Early years ==
Born in Caldwell, Idaho, Jarvis' parents were Curtis E. and Margaret Helen (Mumford) Jarvis. His father was a high school basketball head coach, first at Caldwell High. In the early 1950s, the family moved from Caldwell to Coquille, Oregon, where Curt coached at Coquille High School. He later moved to Roseburg High School when Jim was a high school sophomore.

A point guard, Jarvis played collegiately at Oregon State University in Corvallis, where he helped the Beavers win the NCAA West Regional championship in 1963 and earn their first Final Four appearance. An honorable mention All-American as a senior in 1965, Jarvis also played baseball for the Beavers, and had a brief career as an infielder in the minor leagues in 1966. He was later the golf coach at Oregon State for a season in 1971.

== Pro career ==
Jarvis was selected by the San Francisco Warriors of the National Basketball Association in the sixth round (45th overall) of the 1965 NBA draft, but was cut by the team. Jarvis never played in the NBA, but did spend three seasons in the ABA as a member of the Pittsburgh / Minnesota Pipers and Los Angeles Stars. He was a member of the 1967–68 Pittsburgh Pipers team that won the 1968 ABA Finals, during which Jarvis had a clutch performance in Game 6. With Pittsburgh facing elimination, he came off the bench to score 18 points, making seven out of 12 field goal attempts to help the Pipers stay alive and eventually win the title in Game 7.

== Coaching ==
In 1971, Jarvis was hired as the head basketball coach at Spokane Falls Community College in Spokane. After three seasons, he was hired by the University of Idaho in Moscow in March 1974, following the resignation of eight-year head coach Wayne Anderson after the elimination of full-time assistant coaches. The Vandals had finished no higher than sixth place in the Big Sky for the three previous seasons. After four seasons, all with last place finishes in the conference, Jarvis resigned in June 1978 under recurring allegations of illegal recruiting. The program had been placed on probation for one year in January, resulting in a reprimand for Jarvis and his assistant coach by the university.

Jarvis was succeeded in August by Idaho alumnus Don Monson, who had significantly greater success, taking the Vandals to consecutive conference titles in 1981 and 1982, a top ten ranking, and advancement to the NCAA Sweet Sixteen.

After coaching at Idaho, Jarvis returned to Oregon and worked in real estate in Bend.

== Career playing statistics ==
Legend
GP	Games played	GS	Games started	MPG	Minutes per game
FG%	Field goal percentage	3P%	3-point field goal percentage	FT%	Free throw percentage
RPG	Rebounds per game	APG	Assists per game	SPG	Steals per game
BPG	Blocks per game	PPG	Points per game	**Bold**	Career high
*	Led the league

†	Denotes seasons in which Jarvis's team won an ABA championship

=== ABA ===
==== Regular season ====
Year	Team	GP	MPG	FG%	3P%	FT%	RPG	APG	PPG
1967–68†	Pittsburgh	**63**	13.0	**.385**	.250	.828	1.7	1.1	5.2
1968–69	Minnesota	11	12.2	.311	.400	**.833**	1.3	**1.4**	3.6
1968–69	L.A. Stars	51	**15.2**	.373	**.405**	.784	**2.3**	1.3	**7.0**
Career		125	13.8	.374	.326	.803	1.9	1.2	5.8

==== Playoffs ====
Year	Team	GP	MPG	FG%	3P%	FT%	RPG	APG	PPG
1968†	Pittsburgh	15	14.1	.438	.000	.800	1.4	1.0	6.3

== Head coaching record ==
Record table
Season	Team	Overall	Conference	Standing	Postseason
**Idaho Vandals** (Big Sky) (1974–1978)
1974–75	Idaho	10–16	4–10	8th	
1975–76	Idaho	7–19	3–11	8th	
1976–77	Idaho	5–21	3–11	8th	
1977–78	Idaho	4–22	1–13	8th	
Idaho:		26–78 (.250)	11–45 (.196)		
Total:		26–78			
