= 1974–75 Weber State Wildcats men's basketball team =

American college basketball season

1974–75 Weber State Wildcats men's basketball
- Conference: Big Sky Conference
- Record: 11–15 (6–8 Big Sky)
- Head coach: Gene Visscher (4th season)
- Assistant coaches: Neil McCarthy (5–7 as head coach); Blaine Sylvester
- Home arena: Wildcat Gym

1974–75 Big Sky men's basketball standings
	Conf.				Overall
Team	W		L	PCT	W		L	PCT
Montana	13	–	1	.929	21	–	8	.724
Idaho State	9	–	5	.643	16	–	10	.615
Boise State	7	–	7	.500	13	–	13	.500
Gonzaga	7	–	7	.500	13	–	13	.500
Weber State	6	–	8	.429	11	–	15	.423
Montana State	5	–	9	.357	11	–	15	.423
Northern Arizona	5	–	9	.357	9	–	17	.346
Idaho	4	–	10	.286	10	–	16	.385

The 1974–75 Weber State Wildcats men's basketball team represented Weber State College during the 1974–75 NCAA Division I basketball season. Members of the Big Sky Conference, the Wildcats were led by fourth-year head coach Gene Visscher and played their home games on campus at Wildcat Gym in Ogden, Utah. They were 11–15 overall and 6–8 in conference play.

After Visscher abruptly resigned on Friday, January 24, fourth-year assistant Neil McCarthy took over as head coach. The Wildcats were 6–8 and 1–2 in conference, but had lost four straight, three of which were non-conference. The last was a 26-point road loss to independent Utah State in Logan on Wednesday, January 22.

In the remaining twelve games of the season under McCarthy, the Wildcats were 5–7; this included another loss to Utah State in the season finale, but only by two points in overtime at Ogden. The USU Aggies were invited to the 32-team NCAA Tournament, but were defeated in the first round by Big Sky champion Montana.

Junior forward Jimmie Watts was named to the all-conference team for a second time; junior center Al DeWitt and senior forward Brad Tauscheck were honorable mention.
