= 1987 Big Sky Conference men's basketball tournament =

- Classification: Division I
- Season: 1986–87
- Teams: 8
- Site: Walkup Skydome; Flagstaff, Arizona
- Champions: Idaho State (2nd title)
- Winning coach: Jim Boutin (1st title)
- MVP: Jim Rhode (Idaho State)

1986–87 Big Sky men's basketball standings
	Conf.				Overall
Team	W		L	PCT	W		L	PCT
Montana State	12	–	2	.857	21	–	8	.724
Boise State	10	–	4	.714	22	–	8	.733
Montana	8	–	6	.571	18	–	11	.621
Nevada	7	–	7	.500	15	–	15	.500
Northern Arizona	5	–	9	.357	11	–	17	.393
Idaho	5	–	9	.357	16	–	14	.533
Idaho State †	5	–	9	.357	15	–	16	.484
Weber State	4	–	10	.286	7	–	22	.241
† Conference tournament winner

The 1987 Big Sky Conference men's basketball tournament was the twelfth edition, held March 5–7 at the Walkup Skydome at Northern Arizona University in Flagstaff, Arizona.

Seventh-seeded Idaho State upset fourth-seeded Nevada in the championship game, 92–81, to clinch their second Big Sky tournament title (first was a decade earlier).

The top three seeds (Montana State, Boise State, Montana) lost in the first round, which led to a revised format the following year. ISU had entered the tournament with a 5–9 conference record, 12–15 overall.

== Format ==
For the fourth year, all eligible teams participated in the tournament field and were placed in the quarterfinals. Seedings and pairings were determined by regular season conference records.

== Bracket ==
Quarterfinals; Thursday, March 5
1	Montana State	101
8	Weber State	106
5	Northern Arizona	80
4	Nevada	82
3	Montana	62
6	Idaho	63
7	Idaho State	78
2	Boise State	77

Semifinals; Friday, March 6
8	Weber State	90
4	Nevada	98
6	Idaho	63
7	Idaho State	82

Championship; Saturday, March 7
4	Nevada	81
7	Idaho State	92

== NCAA tournament ==
The Bengals received the automatic bid to the 64-team NCAA tournament, but were seeded sixteenth in the West regional and were routed in the first round by UNLV in Salt Lake City. No other Big Sky members were invited to the tournament, but Montana State and Boise State played in the 32-team NIT and hosted first-round games. BSU defeated Utah by a point and MSU lost by eight to Washington, who defeated the Broncos by five points in the second round in Seattle.
