= 1986–87 Idaho Vandals men's basketball team =

American college basketball season

1986–87 Idaho Vandals men's basketball
- Conference: Big Sky Conference
- Record: 16–14 (5–9 Big Sky)
- Head coach: Tim Floyd (1st season)
- Assistant coaches: Kermit Davis; Larry Eustachy
- Home arena: Kibbie Dome

1986–87 Big Sky men's basketball standings
| | Conf. | | | | Overall |
| Team | W | | L | PCT | W | | L | PCT |
|---|---|---|---|---|---|---|---|---|
| Montana State | 12 | – | 2 | .857 | 21 | – | 8 | .724 |
| Boise State | 10 | – | 4 | .714 | 22 | – | 8 | .733 |
| Montana | 8 | – | 6 | .571 | 18 | – | 11 | .621 |
| Nevada | 7 | – | 7 | .500 | 15 | – | 15 | .500 |
| Northern Arizona | 5 | – | 9 | .357 | 11 | – | 17 | .393 |
| Idaho | 5 | – | 9 | .357 | 16 | – | 14 | .533 |
| Idaho State † | 5 | – | 9 | .357 | 15 | – | 16 | .484 |
| Weber State | 4 | – | 10 | .286 | 7 | – | 22 | .241 |
† Conference tournament winner

The 1986–87 Idaho Vandals men's basketball team represented the University of Idaho during the 1986–87 NCAA Division I men's basketball season. Members of the Big Sky Conference, the Vandals were led by first-year head coach Tim Floyd and played their home games on campus at the Kibbie Dome in Moscow, Idaho.

The Vandals were 15–13 overall in the regular season and 5–9 in conference play. At the conference tournament in Flagstaff, Arizona, Idaho met third-seed Montana in the first quarterfinal at noon and won by a point, the program's first postseason win in five years. In the semifinal the next night, the Vandals lost to seventh-seed Idaho State, the eventual champion, by nineteen to end the season at 16–14.

Assistants Kermit Davis and Larry Eustachy were both future head coaches of the program.

== Postseason results ==
| Date time, TV | Rank^{#} | Opponent^{#} | Result | Record | Site (attendance) city, state |
Big Sky tournament
| Thu, March 5; 11:00 am | (6) | vs. (3) Montana; Quarterfinal | W 63–62 | 16–13 | Walkup Skydome (3,300); Flagstaff, Arizona |
| Fri, March 6; 8:10 pm | (6) | vs. (7) Idaho State; Semifinal | L 63–82 | 16–14 | Walkup Skydome (3,527); Flagstaff, Arizona |
*Non-conference game. ^{#}Rankings from AP poll. (#) Tournament seedings in parentheses. All times are in Pacific time.
