= 1970–71 Idaho Vandals men's basketball team =

American college basketball season

1970–71 Idaho Vandals men's basketball
- Conference: Big Sky Conference
- Record: 14–11 (8–6 Big Sky)
- Head coach: Wayne Anderson (5th season)
- Home arena: Memorial Gymnasium

1970–71 Big Sky men's basketball standings
	Conf.				Overall
Team	W		L	PCT	W		L	PCT
Weber State	12	–	2	.857	21	–	6	.778
Idaho	8	–	6	.571	14	–	11	.560
Montana State	8	–	6	.571	10	–	13	.435
Idaho State	7	–	7	.500	9	–	15	.375
Gonzaga	6	–	8	.429	12	–	13	.480
Montana	6	–	8	.429	8	–	16	.333
Boise State	5	–	9	.357	10	–	16	.385
Northern Arizona	4	–	10	.286	6	–	19	.240

The 1970–71 Idaho Vandals men's basketball team represented the University of Idaho during the 1970–71 NCAA University Division basketball season. Charter members of the recently expanded Big Sky Conference, the Vandals were led by fifth-year head coach Wayne Anderson and played their home games on campus at the Memorial Gymnasium in Moscow, Idaho. They were 14–11 overall and 8–6 in conference play.

Senior forward Malcolm Taylor was selected for the all-conference team, and senior forward John Nelson was on the second team.
