= Adrian Buoncristiani =

American basketball coach (born c. 1940)

Biographical details
- Born: c. 1940 (age 85–86)
- Education: Santa Clara, B.A. 1962; Cal Poly, M.Ed.

Playing career
- 1959–1962: Santa Clara
- Position: Guard

Coaching career (HC unless noted)
- 1970–1972: UC Santa Barbara (assistant)
- 1972–1978: Gonzaga

Head coaching record
- Overall: 78–82

Adrian Buoncristiani (born c. 1940) is a former college basketball coach. He served as the head coach for six seasons at Gonzaga University in Spokane, Washington, from 1972 to 1978.

== Early years ==
Buoncristiani grew up in San Francisco, California, and attended high school at St. Ignatius in the city where he graduated from in 1958. An undersized guard at 5 ft 6 in (1.68 m), he played college basketball at Santa Clara under head coach Bob Feerick in the early 1960s, where he earned a degree in history.

Buoncristiani started his coaching career at the high school level in California at Mission in San Luis Obispo for two years and then at Righetti in Santa Maria. He became a college assistant in 1970 at U.C. Santa Barbara, where he stayed for two seasons.

== Gonzaga ==
Hired in April 1972, Buoncristiani succeeded Hank Anderson, who left Gonzaga after 21 years as head coach for a similar position at Montana State in Bozeman, then a conference rival in the Big Sky Conference. Less than a week after accepting the job, Buoncristiani was involved in a traffic accident in Spokane in which his car was demolished, but "ABC" escaped with only minor injuries.

In his six seasons at Gonzaga, Buoncristiani had an overall record of 78–82 (.488), and a conference record of 39–45 (.464), but never finished better than third in the Big Sky.

Weeks after the conclusion of the 1978 season, Buoncristiani was encouraged to resign in April, days before letter of intent signing day. He was succeeded by Dan Fitzgerald, a former GU assistant during ABC's first two years with the Bulldogs and a teammate from high school at St. Ignatius in San Francisco.

Fitzgerald immediately pushed for a change in conferences, first as head coach and soon added title of athletic director. Gonzaga left the Big Sky in June 1979 and joined the West Coast Athletic Conference, swapping places with Nevada.

== After coaching ==
Buoncristiani moved to Kansas City in 1978 to work for Converse athletic shoes; he was the "Salesman of the Year" in his first year. After three years, he relocated with Converse to Reno, Nevada, and later lived in Spokane.

Buoncristiani returned to Nevada and was an assistant coach at Galena High School in Reno. His son Lance was 1999 graduate of Galena and was a point guard at Idaho for his freshman season in 2000.

== Head coaching record ==
Record table
Season	Team	Overall	Conference	Standing	Postseason
Gonzaga Bulldogs (Big Sky Conference) (1972–1978)
1972–73	Gonzaga	14–12	6–8	5th	
1973–74	Gonzaga	13–13	7–7	4th	
1974–75	Gonzaga	13–13	7–7	T–3rd	
1975–76	Gonzaga	13–13	5–9	7th	
1976–77	Gonzaga	11–16	7–7	3rd	
1977–78	Gonzaga	14–15	7–7	5th	
Gonzaga:		78–82 (.488)	39–45 (.464)		
Total:		78–82			
