= 1974–75 Montana Grizzlies basketball team =

American college basketball season

1974–75 Montana Grizzlies men's basketball

Big Sky champions

NCAA tournament, Sweet Sixteen
- Conference: Big Sky Conference
- Record: 21–8 (13–1 Big Sky)
- Head coach: Jud Heathcote (4th season)
- Assistant coach: Jim Brandenburg
- Home arena: Adams Fieldhouse

1974–75 Big Sky men's basketball standings
	Conf.				Overall
Team	W		L	PCT	W		L	PCT
Montana	13	–	1	.929	21	–	8	.724
Idaho State	9	–	5	.643	16	–	10	.615
Boise State	7	–	7	.500	13	–	13	.500
Gonzaga	7	–	7	.500	13	–	13	.500
Weber State	6	–	8	.429	11	–	15	.423
Montana State	5	–	9	.357	11	–	15	.423
Northern Arizona	5	–	9	.357	9	–	17	.346
Idaho	4	–	10	.286	10	–	16	.385

The 1974–75 Montana Grizzlies basketball team represented the University of Montana during the 1974–75 NCAA Division I basketball season. Charter members of the Big Sky Conference, the Grizzlies were led by fourth-year head coach Jud Heathcote and played their home games on campus at Adams Fieldhouse in Missoula, Montana.

They finished the regular season at 20–6, with a 13–1 record in conference to win the title (by four games) and earned a berth in the expanded 32-team NCAA tournament. This season was the last for the Big Sky without a conference tournament; Montana's sole conference loss was on the road to defending champion Idaho State.

In the opening round of the NCAA tournament at Pullman, Washington, Montana surprised Utah State and won by six points. It was a homecoming for Heathcote, an alumnus of Washington State and former assistant coach, so the Griz had plenty of support in the arena among the locals and traveling Montana supporters.

With the win, Montana advanced to the Sweet Sixteen at the West Regional in Portland, Oregon, and met second-ranked UCLA. In a game that went down to the last seconds, the Bruins won by just three points; they went on to win the national championship in John Wooden's final season as head coach.

Montana lost the third-place game to UNLV by eight points to finish the season at 21–8 (.724).

Two seniors were on the all-conference team, center Ken McKenzie and swingman Eric Hays; freshman guard Micheal Ray Richardson was honorable mention. Richardson was all-conference the next three years, the fourth overall selection of the 1978 NBA draft, and a four-time NBA All-Star.

== Postseason results ==
Date time, TV	Opponent	Result	Record	Site (attendance) city, state
NCAA tournament
Sat, March 15*; 8:10 pm	vs. Utah State; First round	W 69–63	21–6	WSU Coliseum (10,500); Pullman, Washington
Thu, March 20*; 8:10 pm	vs. No. 2 UCLA; Regional semifinal (Sweet 16)	L 64–67	21–7	Memorial Coliseum (9,797); Portland, Oregon
Sat, March 22*; 12:00 pm	vs. No. 16 UNLV; Regional Third Place	L 67–75	21–8	Memorial Coliseum (8,534); Portland, Oregon
*Non-conference game. ^{#}Rankings from AP Poll. (#) Tournament seedings in parentheses. All times are in Mountain time.
