= 1974–75 Gonzaga Bulldogs men's basketball team =

American college basketball season

1974–75 Gonzaga Bulldogs men's basketball
- Conference: Big Sky Conference
- Record: 13–13 (7–7 Big Sky)
- Head coach: Adrian Buoncristiani (3rd season)
- Home arena: Kennedy Pavilion

1974–75 Big Sky men's basketball standings
	Conf.				Overall
Team	W		L	PCT	W		L	PCT
Montana	13	–	1	.929	21	–	8	.724
Idaho State	9	–	5	.643	16	–	10	.615
Boise State	7	–	7	.500	13	–	13	.500
Gonzaga	7	–	7	.500	13	–	13	.500
Weber State	6	–	8	.429	11	–	15	.423
Montana State	5	–	9	.357	11	–	15	.423
Northern Arizona	5	–	9	.357	9	–	17	.346
Idaho	4	–	10	.286	10	–	16	.385

The 1974–75 Gonzaga Bulldogs men's basketball team represented Gonzaga University during the 1974–75 NCAA Division I basketball season. Members of the Big Sky Conference, the Bulldogs were led by third-year head coach Adrian Buoncristiani and played their home games on campus at Kennedy Pavilion in Spokane, Washington. They were 13–13 overall and 7–7 in conference play, tied for third.

Senior guard Ken Tyler was a unanimous selection to the all-conference team; sophomore guard John Holstein and sophomore center Willie Moss were honorable mention.

The conference tournament debuted the following season.

== Schedule ==
Date time, TV	Rank^{#}	Opponent^{#}	Result	Record	Site city, state
Nov 30, 1974*		at Oregon State	L 59–84	0–1	
Dec 1, 1974*		at Portland State	W 91–87	1–1	
Dec 5, 1974*		at Seattle University	L 50–53	1–2	
Dec 7, 1974*		at San Jose State	L 63–71	1–3	
Dec 9, 1974*		at Depaul	L 73–80	1–4	
Dec 17, 1974*		at Whitworth	W 69–51	2–4	
Dec 23, 1974*		at Lewis-Clark State	W 88–55	3–4	
Dec 27, 1974*		at Uc-Santa Barbara	L 56–59	3–5	
Dec 28, 1974*		at Texas Christian	W 68–60	4–5	
Jan 2, 1975*		Washington State	L 50–73	4–6	Spokane Coliseum
Jan 10, 1975		at Idaho	L 61–63	4–7	
Jan 11, 1975*		at Simon Fraser	W 85–63	5–7	
Jan 17, 1975		at Idaho	W 73–63	6–7	
Jan 18, 1975*		at Seattle Pacific	W 81–58	7–7	
Jan 24, 1975		at Boise State	W 84–81	8–7	
Jan 25, 1975		at Idaho State	L 52–64	8–8	
Jan 31, 1975		at Montana	L 51–53	8–9	
Feb 1, 1975		at Montana State	W 88–77	9–9	
Feb 7, 1975		at Montana	L 39–55	9–10	
Feb 8, 1975		at Montana State	L 56–58	9–11	
Feb 13, 1975		at Northern Arizona	W 91–90	10–11	
Feb 15, 1975		at Weber State	L 67–75	10–12	
Feb 21, 1975		at Northern Arizona	W 77–75	11–12	
Feb 22, 1975		at Weber State	W 67–60	12–12	
Feb 28, 1975		at Boise State	L 77–78	12–13	
Mar 1, 1975		at Idaho State	W 87–78	13–13	
*Non-conference game. ^{#}Rankings from AP Poll. (#) Tournament seedings in parentheses.
