= 1970–71 Gonzaga Bulldogs men's basketball team =

American college basketball season

1970–71 Gonzaga Bulldogs men's basketball
- Conference: Big Sky Conference
- Record: 12–13 (6–8 Big Sky)
- Head coach: Hank Anderson (20th season)
- Home arena: Kennedy Pavilion

1970–71 Big Sky men's basketball standings
	Conf.				Overall
Team	W		L	PCT	W		L	PCT
Weber State	12	–	2	.857	21	–	6	.778
Idaho	8	–	6	.571	14	–	11	.560
Montana State	8	–	6	.571	10	–	13	.435
Idaho State	7	–	7	.500	9	–	15	.375
Gonzaga	6	–	8	.429	12	–	13	.480
Montana	6	–	8	.429	8	–	16	.333
Boise State	5	–	9	.357	10	–	16	.385
Northern Arizona	4	–	10	.286	6	–	19	.240

The 1970–71 Gonzaga Bulldogs men's basketball team represented Gonzaga University during the 1970–71 NCAA University Division basketball season. Charter members of the recently expanded Big Sky Conference, the Bulldogs were led by twentieth-year head coach Hank Anderson and played their home games on campus at Kennedy Pavilion in Spokane, Washington. They were 12–13 overall and 6–8 in conference play, tied for fifth place.

No Bulldogs were selected for the all-conference team; senior center Bill Quigg was on the second team.

== Schedule ==
Date time, TV	Rank^{#}	Opponent^{#}	Result	Record	Site city, state
Dec 1, 1970*		at Washington State	L 70–81	0–1	
Dec 5, 1970*		at Washington State	W 74–72	1–1	
Dec 7, 1970*		at Parsons College	W 62–58	2–1	
Dec 10, 1970*		at Utah State	L 74–80	2–2	
Dec 12, 1970*		at St. Cloud State	W 89–72	3–2	
Dec 14, 1970*		at Puget Sound	L 88–111	3–3	
Dec 19, 1970*		at Seattle University	W 71–69	4–3	
Dec 22, 1970		at Montana State	W 94–79	5–3	
Jan 5, 1971		at Idaho	L 75–80	5–4	
Jan 9, 1971		at Idaho State	L 68–70	5–5	
Jan 11, 1971		at Boise State	L 74–90	5–6	
Jan 16, 1971		at Montana	W 81–73	6–6	
Jan 23, 1971*		at Portland State	L 82–92	6–7	
Jan 25, 1971*		at Central Washington	W 74–69	7–7	
Jan 30, 1971*		at Washington	L 78–86	7–8	
Feb 2, 1971*		at Eastern Washington	W 84–69	8–8	
Feb 6, 1971		at Montana	L 71–82	8–9	
Feb 8, 1971		at Montana State	L 71–81	8–10	
Feb 13, 1971		at Northern Arizona	W 111–83	9–10	
Feb 15, 1971		at Weber State	L 65–86	9–11	
Feb 18, 1971		at Northern Arizona	L 77–83	9–12	
Feb 20, 1971		at Weber State	L 65–86	9–13	
Feb 23, 1971*		at Portland	W 82–67	10–13	
Feb 27, 1971		at Boise State	W 92–87	11–13	
Mar 1, 1971		at Idaho State	W 75–59	12–13	
Mar 4, 1971		at Idaho	W 79–55	13–13	
*Non-conference game. ^{#}Rankings from AP Poll. (#) Tournament seedings in parentheses.
