= 1974–75 Idaho Vandals men's basketball team =

American college basketball season

1974–75 Idaho Vandals men's basketball
- Conference: Big Sky Conference
- Record: 10–16 (4–10 Big Sky)
- Head coach: Jim Jarvis (1st season)
- Assistant coach: John G. Smith
- Captains: Roger Davis (C); Rick Nelson
- Home arena: Memorial Gymnasium

1974–75 Big Sky men's basketball standings
	Conf.				Overall
Team	W		L	PCT	W		L	PCT
Montana	13	–	1	.929	21	–	8	.724
Idaho State	9	–	5	.643	16	–	10	.615
Boise State	7	–	7	.500	13	–	13	.500
Gonzaga	7	–	7	.500	13	–	13	.500
Weber State	6	–	8	.429	11	–	15	.423
Montana State	5	–	9	.357	11	–	15	.423
Northern Arizona	5	–	9	.357	9	–	17	.346
Idaho	4	–	10	.286	10	–	16	.385

The 1974–75 Idaho Vandals men's basketball team represented the University of Idaho during the 1974–75 NCAA Division I men's basketball season. Members of the Big Sky Conference, the Vandals were led by first-year head coach Jim Jarvis and played their home games on campus at the Memorial Gymnasium in Moscow, Idaho. They were 10–16 overall and 4–10 in conference play.

No Vandals were named to the all-conference team; senior guard Henry Harris was on the second team and junior guard Steve Weist was honorable mention.

Hired in March 1974, Jarvis was previously the head coach for three years at Spokane Falls Community College, and led the Vandal program for four seasons. He played at Oregon State under head coach Slats Gill and for several seasons as a professional.
