= 1970–71 Weber State Wildcats men's basketball team =

American college basketball season

1970–71 Weber State Wildcats men's basketball

Big Sky champions

NCAA tournament, First round
- Conference: Big Sky Conference

Ranking
- Coaches: No. 20
- Record: 21–6 (12–2 Big Sky)
- Head coach: Phil Johnson (3rd season)
- Assistant coach: Gene Visscher
- Home arena: Wildcat Gym

1970–71 Big Sky men's basketball standings
	Conf.				Overall
Team	W		L	PCT	W		L	PCT
Weber State	12	–	2	.857	21	–	6	.778
Idaho	8	–	6	.571	14	–	11	.560
Montana State	8	–	6	.571	10	–	13	.435
Idaho State	7	–	7	.500	9	–	15	.375
Gonzaga	6	–	8	.429	12	–	13	.480
Montana	6	–	8	.429	8	–	16	.333
Boise State	5	–	9	.357	10	–	16	.385
Northern Arizona	4	–	10	.286	6	–	19	.240

The 1970–71 Weber State Wildcats men's basketball team represented Weber State College during the 1970–71 NCAA University Division basketball season. Members of the Big Sky Conference, the Wildcats were led by third-year head coach Phil Johnson and played their home games on campus at Wildcat Gym in Ogden, Utah. They were 21–5 in the regular season and 12–2 in conference play.

The conference tournament was five years away, and for the fourth consecutive season, Weber State won the Big Sky title and played in the 25-team NCAA tournament. In the West regional at nearby Logan, they met Jerry Tarkanian's Long Beach State 49ers in the first round for a second straight year and lost again, this time by eleven points.

Both starting forwards were unanimously selected to the all-conference team; senior Willie Sojourner was named for a third consecutive season and junior Bob Davis repeated the next year.

Following the season, Johnson became an assistant in the NBA with the Chicago Bulls under Dick Motta, whom he had played for in high school in Idaho and coached under at Weber.

== Postseason result ==
Date time, TV	Opponent	Result	Record	Site (attendance) city, state
NCAA tournament
Sat, March 13*; 7:05 pm	vs. Long Beach State; First round	L 66–77	21–6	Smith Spectrum (10,200); Logan, Utah
*Non-conference game. ^{#}Rankings from AP poll. (#) Tournament seedings in parentheses. All times are in Mountain time.
