= 2024–25 Boise State Broncos men's basketball team =

American college basketball season

2024–25 Boise State Broncos men's basketball

College Basketball Crown, Semifinals
- Conference: Mountain West Conference
- Record: 26–11 (14–6 MW)
- Head coach: Leon Rice (15th season)
- Assistant coaches: Mike Burns (9th season); Tim Duryea (7th season); Roberto Bergersen (3rd season); David Moats (7th season); Lexus Williams (1st season)
- Home arena: ExtraMile Arena

2024–25 Mountain West Conference men's basketball standings
	Conf.				Overall
Team	W		L	PCT	W		L	PCT
New Mexico	17	–	3	.850	27	–	8	.771
Colorado State †	16	–	4	.800	26	–	10	.722
Utah State	15	–	5	.750	26	–	8	.765
San Diego State	14	–	6	.700	21	–	10	.677
Boise State	14	–	6	.700	26	–	11	.703
UNLV	11	–	9	.550	18	–	15	.545
Nevada	8	–	12	.400	17	–	16	.515
San Jose State	7	–	13	.350	15	–	20	.429
Wyoming	5	–	15	.250	12	–	20	.375
Fresno State	2	–	18	.100	6	–	26	.188
Air Force	1	–	19	.050	4	–	28	.125
† 2025 Mountain West tournament winner

The 2024–25 Boise State Broncos men's basketball team represented Boise State University during the 2024–25 NCAA Division I men's basketball season. The Broncos, led by fifteenth-year head coach Leon Rice, are members of the Mountain West Conference. They played their home games at ExtraMile Arena in Boise, Idaho.

== Previous season ==
The 2023–24 finished the 2023–24 season 22–11, 13–5 in Mountain West play to finish in a tie for second place. As a No. 3 seed in the Mountain West Tournament they lost in the quarterfinals to New Mexico. They received an at-large bid to the NCAA tournament as a No. 11 seed in the South Region they lost in the First Four to Colorado.

== Offseason ==
=== Departures ===
Name	Number	Pos.	Height	Weight	Year	Hometown	Reason for departure
Roddie Anderson III	0	G	6'3"	190	Sophomore	Huntington Beach, CA	Transferred to Xavier
Kobe Young	3	G	6'7"	208	(redshirt) Sophomore	Pasco, WA	Transferred to Cal State Fullerton
Kade Rice	8	G	6'4"	188	(redshirt) Freshman	Boise, ID	Walk-on; transferred to Salt Lake CC
Chibuzo Agbo	11	G	6'7"	226	Senior	San Diego, CA	Graduate transferred to USC
Max Rice	12	G	6'5"	205	GS Senior	Boise, ID	Walk-on; graduated
Mohamed Sylla	14	C	6'11"	243	GS Senior	Abidjan, Ivory Coast	Graduated
Jace Whiting	15	G	6'3"	188	Sophomore	Burley, ID	Transferred to UNLV
Vince Barringer	20	G	6'6"	218	(redshirt) Freshman	San Carlos, CA	Walk-on; not on team roster
Sam Winter	22	G	6'2"	192	Senior	Montesano, WA	Walk-on; graduated
Alex Martin	30	G	6'5"	218	Freshman	Webb, MO	Walk-on; not on team roster
Cam Martin	31	F	6'9"	234	GS Senior	Yukon, OK	Graduated

=== Incoming transfers ===
Name	Number	Pos.	Height	Weight	Year	Hometown	Previous School
Dominic Parolin	9	F/C	6'9"	245	GS Senior	Coquitlam, BC	Lehigh
Alvaro Cardenas Torre	11	G	6'1"	182	Senior	Granada, Spain	San Jose State
Javan Buchanan	22	F	6'7"	210	Junior	Lafayette, IN	Indiana Wesleyan
Dylan Anderson	44	F	7'0"	240	(redshirt) Sophomore	Gilbert, AZ	Arizona

=== Recruiting classes ===
==== 2024 recruiting class ====
College recruiting information
Name	Hometown	School	Height	Weight	Commit date
Ethan Lathan #28 C	Rockford, IL	AZ Compass Prep	6 ft 9 in (2.06 m)	180 lb (82 kg)	Jul 5, 2024
Ethan Lathan #28 C	Recruit ratings: Rivals: 247Sports: ESPN: (79)				
Moses Hipps #63 SG	Powder Springs, GA	AZ Compass Prep	6 ft 9 in (2.06 m)	180 lb (82 kg)	May 22, 2024
Moses Hipps #63 SG	Recruit ratings: Rivals: 247Sports: ESPN: (78)				
Julian Bowie; PG	Pocatello, ID	Pocatello	6 ft 3 in (1.91 m)	180 lb (82 kg)	Aug 23, 2022
Julian Bowie; PG	Recruit ratings: No ratings found				
Pearson Carmichael; SG	Bend, OR	Summit	6 ft 6 in (1.98 m)	182 lb (83 kg)	Nov 11, 2022
Pearson Carmichael; SG	Recruit ratings: No ratings found				
Overall recruit ranking:
Note: In many cases, Scout, Rivals, 247Sports, On3, and ESPN may conflict in their listings of height and weight.; In these cases, the average was taken. ESPN grades are on a 100-point scale.; Sources: "2024 Team Ranking". Rivals.

== Roster ==
2024–25 Boise State Broncos men's basketball team
Players
Coaches

Pos.	#	Name	Height	Weight	Year	Previous school	Hometown
G	0	Julian Bowie	6 ft 3 in (1.91 m)	200 lb (91 kg)	Fr	Pocatello High School	Pocatello, Idaho
F	1	O'Mar Stanley	6 ft 8 in (2.03 m)	240 lb (109 kg)	Sr	St. John's	Overland Park, Kansas
F	2	Tyson Degenhart	6 ft 8 in (2.03 m)	235 lb (107 kg)	Sr	Mt. Spokane High School	Spokane, Washington
G	3	Moses Hipps	6 ft 4 in (1.93 m)	170 lb (77 kg)	Fr	AZ Compass Prep (AZ)	Voorhees, New Jersey
F	4	Ethan Lathan	6 ft 10 in (2.08 m)	220 lb (100 kg)	Fr	AZ Compass Prep (AZ)	Rockford, Illinois
G	5	RJ Keene II	6 ft 7 in (2.01 m)	202 lb (92 kg)	RS Jr	Concordia Lutheran High School	The Woodlands, Texas
F	6	Pearson Carmichael	6 ft 7 in (2.01 m)	208 lb (94 kg)	Fr	Summit High School	Bend, Oregon
G	7	Chris Lockett Jr.	6 ft 4 in (1.93 m)	205 lb (93 kg)	RS Fr	Isidore Newman School	New Orleans, Louisiana
F	9	Dominic Parolin	6 ft 9 in (2.06 m)	245 lb (111 kg)	Sr	Lehigh	Coquitlam, British Columbia
F	10	Emmanuel Ugbo	6 ft 8 in (2.03 m)	235 lb (107 kg)	So	Riesen Ludwigsburg	Barendrecht, Netherlands
G	11	Alvaro Cardenas	6 ft 1 in (1.85 m)	182 lb (83 kg)	Jr	San Jose State	Granada, Spain
F	13	Andrew Meadow	6 ft 7 in (2.01 m)	218 lb (99 kg)	So	West Ranch High School	Santa Clarita, California
F	22	Javan Buchanan	6 ft 7 in (2.01 m)	230 lb (104 kg)	Jr	Indiana Wesleyan	Lafayette, Indiana
F	44	Dylan Anderson	7 ft 0 in (2.13 m)	240 lb (109 kg)	RS So	Arizona	Gilbert, Arizona

Head coach

- Leon Rice (Washington State)

Assistant coach(es)

- Mike Burns (Central Washington)
- Tim Duryea (North Texas)
- Roberto Bergersen (Boise State)
- David Moats (Florida)
- Lexus Williams (Valparaiso)

Legend

- (C) Team captain
- (S) Suspended
- (I) Ineligible
- (W) Walk-on
- Injured
- Current redshirt

Roster

== Schedule and results ==
Date time, TV	Rank^{#}	Opponent^{#}	Result	Record	High points	High rebounds	High assists	Site (attendance) city, state
Non-conference regular season
November 6, 2024*; 7:00 p.m., MW Network		Oakland	W 87−43	1−0	15 – Tied	8 – Stanley	6 – Keene II	ExtraMile Arena (10,626); Boise, ID
November 9, 2024*; 8:30 p.m., ESPN+		at San Francisco	L 73–84	1–1	25 – Degenhart	9 – Meadow	5 – Cardenas	Sobrato Center (2,963); San Francisco, CA
November 12, 2024*; 7:00 p.m., MW Network		Corban	W 100–65	2–1	16 – Buchanan	13 – Stanley	5 – Bowie	ExtraMile Arena (10,508); Boise, ID
November 17, 2024*; 11:30 a.m., CBSSN		Clemson	W 84–71	3–1	20 – Degenhart	11 – Degenhart	6 – Cardenas	ExtraMile Arena (11,275); Boise, ID
November 24, 2024*; 9:00 a.m., FloSports		vs. Hampton; Cayman Islands Classic quarterfinals	W 83–69	4–1	25 – Degenhart	6 – Meadow	8 – Cardenas	John Gray Gymnasium (919); George Town, Cayman Islands
November 25, 2024*; 11:30 a.m., FloSports		vs. South Dakota State; Cayman Islands Classic semifinals	W 83–82	5–1	28 – Buchanan	8 – Degenhart	7 – Tied	John Gray Gymnasium (910); George Town, Cayman Islands
November 26, 2024*; 5:30 p.m., FloSports		vs. Boston College; Cayman Islands Classic championship	L 61–63	5–2	24 – Buchanan	6 – Stanley	3 – Cardenas	John Gray Gymnasium (1,075); George Town, Cayman Islands
December 3, 2024*; 7:00 p.m., MW Network		Utah Tech	W 87–64	6–2	21 – Degenhart	8 – Meadow	10 – Cardenas	ExtraMile Arena (10,282); Boise, ID
December 7, 2024*; 2:00 p.m., CBS		vs. Washington State	L 69–74	6–3	21 – Meadow	9 – Stanley	5 – Cardenas	Idaho Central Arena (4.570); Boise, ID
December 14, 2024*; 7:00 p.m.		vs. Saint Mary's	W 67–65 ^{OT}	7–3	19 – Degenhart	11 – Stanley	4 – Cardenas	Mountain America Center (3,443); Idaho Falls, ID
December 17, 2024*; 7:00 p.m., MW Network		Texas Southern	W 82–51	8–3	19 – Degenhart	10 – Tied	7 – Cardenas	ExtraMile Arena (9,968); Boise, ID
Mountain West regular season
December 21, 2024; 1:30 p.m., MW Network		Air Force	W 77–59	9–3 (1–0)	19 – Degenhart	6 – Tied	12 – Cardenas	ExtraMile Arena (10,471); Boise, ID
December 28, 2024; 3:00 p.m., MW Network		at San Jose State	W 73–71	10–3 (2–0)	26 – Degenhart	8 – Stanley	10 – Cardenas	Provident Credit Union Event Center (1,767); San Jose, CA
December 31, 2024; 6:30 p.m., MW Network		at Wyoming	W 67–58	11–3 (3–0)	19 – Cardenas	9 – Degenhart	6 – Cardenas	Arena-Auditorium (3,823); Laramie, WY
January 4, 2025; 2:00 p.m., CBS		San Diego State	L 68–76	11–4 (3–1)	16 – Lockett	8 – Buchanan	6 – Cardenas	ExtraMile Arena (12,058); Boise, ID
January 7, 2025; 8:30 p.m., FS1		UNLV	W 81–59	12–4 (4–1)	21 – Degenhart	11 – Degenhart	9 – Cardenas	ExtraMile Arena (10,117); Boise, ID
January 11, 2025; 7:00 p.m., CBSSN		at No. 25 Utah State	L 79–81	12–5 (4–2)	22 – Degenhart	5 – Tied	8 – Cardenas	Smith Spectrum (10,270); Logan, UT
January 14, 2025; 7:00 p.m., MW Network		Wyoming	W 96–55	13–5 (5–2)	18 – Meadow	7 – Ugbo	8 – Cardenas	ExtraMile Arena (10,474); Boise, ID
January 17, 2025; 9:00 p.m., FS1		at New Mexico	L 65–84	13–6 (5–3)	14 – Tied	7 – Degenhart	6 – Cardenas	The Pit (14,519); Albuquerque, NM
January 22, 2025; 6:00 p.m., CBSSN		at Colorado State	L 72–75	13–7 (5–4)	27 – Degenhart	5 – Tied	7 – Cardenas	Moby Arena (5,244); Fort Collins, Colorado
January 29, 2025; 8:00 p.m., CBSSN		Nevada	W 66–56	14–7 (6–4)	19 – Buchanan	10 – Keene II	5 – Cardenas	ExtraMile Arena (9,788); Boise, ID
February 1, 2025; 2:00 p.m., MW Network		Fresno State	W 82–60	15–7 (7–4)	20 – Meadow	9 – Degenheart	7 – Cardenas	ExtraMile Arena (10,853); Boise, ID
February 4, 2025; 9:00 p.m., CBSSN		at UNLV	W 71–62	16–7 (8–4)	16 – Degenhart	10 – Keene II	6 – Cardenas	Thomas & Mack Center (5,081); Paradise, NV
February 7, 2025; 7:00 p.m., FS1		San Jose State	W 79–52	17–7 (9–4)	22 – Degenhart	6 – Tied	9 – Cardenas	ExtraMile Arena (10,738); Boise, ID
February 15, 2025; 8:00 p.m., CBSSN		at San Diego State	L 47–64	17–8 (9–5)	17 – Degenhart	12 – Degenhart	3 – Cardenas	Viejas Arena (12,414); San Diego, CA
February 19, 2025; 8:00 p.m., CBSSN		New Mexico	W 86–78	18–8 (10–5)	32 – Degenhart	7 – Degenhart	10 – Cardenas	ExtraMile Arena (11,110); Boise, ID
February 22, 2025; 4:00 p.m., FS1		at Nevada	W 70–69	19–8 (11–5)	24 – Meadow	9 – Keene II	9 – Cardenas	Lawlor Events Center (10,521); Reno, NV
February 26, 2025; 8:30 p.m., FS1		Utah State	W 82–65	20–8 (12–5)	21 – Degenhart	6 – Cardenas	7 – Cardenas	ExtraMile Arena (11,911); Boise, ID
March 1, 2025; 5:00 p.m.		at Fresno State	W 66–61	21–8 (13–5)	22 – Meadow	11 – Degenhart	6 – Cardenas	Save Mart Center; Fresno, CA
March 4, 2025; 7:00 p.m., Altitude		at Air Force	W 80–57	22–8 (14–5)	14 – Tied	10 – Keene II	6 – Cardenas	Clune Arena (1,641); Colorado Springs, CO
March 7, 2025; 8:00 p.m., FS1		Colorado State	L 73–83	22–9 (14–6)	22 – Meadow	9 – Degenhart	8 – Cardenas	Extra Mile Arena (12,061); Boise, Idaho
Mountain West tournament
March 13, 2025; 3:30 p.m., CBSSN	(5)	vs. (4) San Diego State; Quarterfinals	W 62–52	23–9	16 – Cardenas	9 – Keene II	4 – Cardenas	Thomas & Mack Center; Paradise, NV
March 14, 2025; 7:30 PM, CBSSN	(5)	vs. (1) New Mexico; Semifinals	W 72–69	24–9	22 – Degenhart	10 – Keene II	12 – Cardenas	Thomas & Mack Center; Paradise, NV
March 15, 2025; 4:00 PM, CBS	(5)	vs. (2) Colorado State; Championship	L 56–69	24–10	22 – Degenhart	8 – Ugbo	8 – Cardenas	Thomas & Mack Center (4,675); Paradise, NV
College Basketball Crown
March 31, 2025*; 3:30 p.m., FS1		vs. George Washington; First round	W 89–59	25–10	19 – Degenhart	6 – Stanley	6 – Cardenas	MGM Grand Garden Arena (2,119); Paradise, NV
April 2, 2025*; 5:00 p.m., FS1		vs. Butler; Quarterfinals	W 100–93	26–10	27 – Buchanan	7 – Degenhart	5 – Degenhart	MGM Grand Garden Arena (2,512); Paradise, NV
April 5, 2025*; 11:30 a.m., FOX		vs. Nebraska; Semifinals	L 69–79	26–11	26 – Degenhart	8 – Degenhart	9 – Cardenas	T-Mobile Arena (2,972); Paradise, NV
*Non-conference game. ^{#}Rankings from AP Poll. (#) Tournament seedings in parentheses. All times are in Mountain Time.

== Rankings ==
Ranking movements Legend: ██ Increase in ranking ██ Decrease in ranking — = Not ranked RV = Received votes
	Week																				
Poll	Pre	1	2	3	4	5	6	7	8	9	10	11	12	13	14	15	16	17	18	19	Final
AP	RV	RV	—	—	—	—	—	—	—	—	—	—	—	—	—	—	—	—	—	—	—
Coaches	RV	—	—	—	—	—	—	—	—	—	—	—	—	—	—	—	—	RV	—	—	—
