= 1974–75 Boise State Broncos men's basketball team =

American college basketball season

1974–75 Boise State Broncos men's basketball
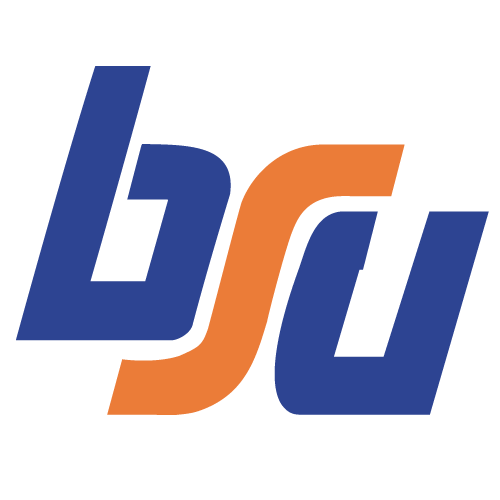
- Conference: Big Sky Conference
- Record: 13–13 (7–7 Big Sky)
- Head coach: Bus Connor (2nd season)
- Home arena: Bronco Gymnasium

1974–75 Big Sky men's basketball standings
	Conf.				Overall
Team	W		L	PCT	W		L	PCT
Montana	13	–	1	.929	21	–	8	.724
Idaho State	9	–	5	.643	16	–	10	.615
Boise State	7	–	7	.500	13	–	13	.500
Gonzaga	7	–	7	.500	13	–	13	.500
Weber State	6	–	8	.429	11	–	15	.423
Montana State	5	–	9	.357	11	–	15	.423
Northern Arizona	5	–	9	.357	9	–	17	.346
Idaho	4	–	10	.286	10	–	16	.385

The 1974–75 Boise State Broncos men's basketball team represented Boise State University during the 1974–75 NCAA Division I men's basketball season. The Broncos were led by head coach Bus Connor, in his second full season, and played their home games on campus at Bronco Gymnasium in Boise, Idaho.

They finished the regular season at 13–13 overall, with a 7–7 record in the Big Sky Conference, tied for third in the standings. League champion Montana nearly knocked off eventual national champion UCLA in the Sweet Sixteen of the NCAA tournament.

Junior center Pat Hoke was named to the all-conference team; junior guard Terry Miller and freshman guard Steve Connor were honorable mention.

There was no conference tournament yet; it debuted the following year, and Boise State won it.
