= 1974–75 Idaho State Bengals men's basketball team =

American college basketball season

1974–75 Idaho State Bengals men's basketball
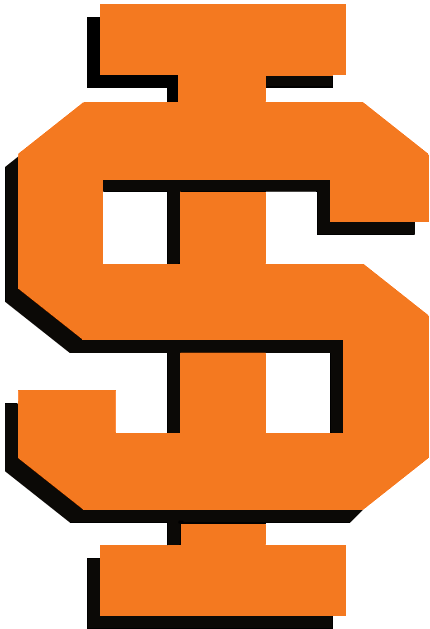
- Conference: Big Sky Conference
- Record: 16–10 (9–5 Big Sky)
- Head coach: Jim Killingsworth (4th season)
- Home arena: ISU Minidome

1974–75 Big Sky men's basketball standings
	Conf.				Overall
Team	W		L	PCT	W		L	PCT
Montana	13	–	1	.929	21	–	8	.724
Idaho State	9	–	5	.643	16	–	10	.615
Boise State	7	–	7	.500	13	–	13	.500
Gonzaga	7	–	7	.500	13	–	13	.500
Weber State	6	–	8	.429	11	–	15	.423
Montana State	5	–	9	.357	11	–	15	.423
Northern Arizona	5	–	9	.357	9	–	17	.346
Idaho	4	–	10	.286	10	–	16	.385

The 1974–75 Idaho State Bengals men's basketball team represented Idaho State University during the 1974–75 NCAA Division I men's basketball season.

The Bengals were led by fourth-year head coach Jim Killingsworth and played their home games on campus at the ISU Minidome in Pocatello. They finished the regular season at 16–10 overall, with a 9–5 record in the Big Sky Conference.

Sophomore center Steve Hayes was named to the all-conference team; senior guard Kevin Hoyt was on the second team and senior guard George Rodriquez was honorable mention.
