= Jason Ellis (basketball) =

American basketball player (born 1982)

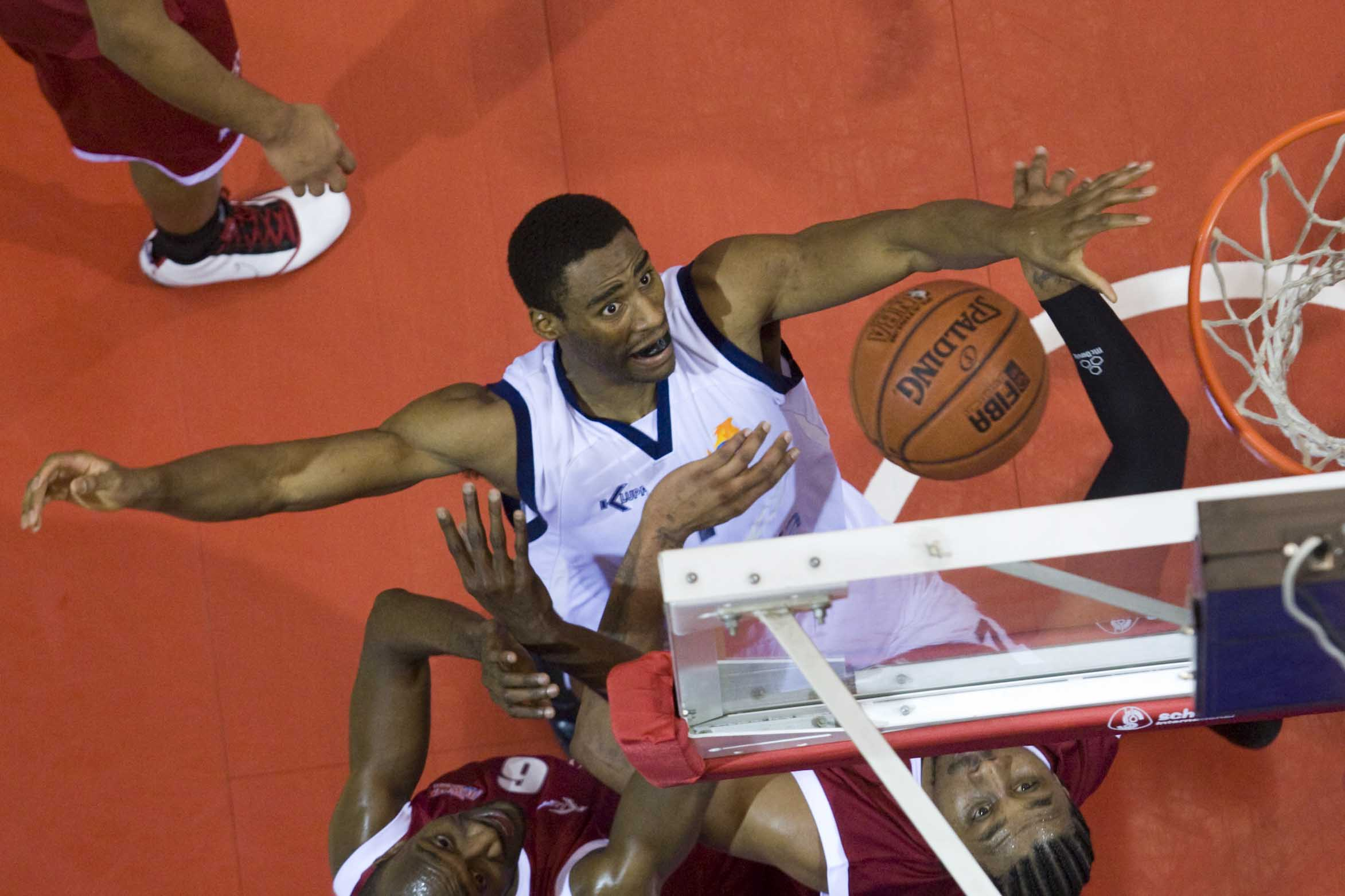
- Ellis playing with GasTerra Flames in 2010

Personal information
- Born: December 15, 1982 (age 43) Kent, Washington
- Listed height: 6 ft 7 in (2.01 m)
- Listed weight: 220 lb (100 kg)

Career information
- High school: Kentridge (Kent, Washington)
- College: Boise State (2001–2005)
- NBA draft: 2005: undrafted
- Playing career: 2005–2014
- Position: Power forward
- Number: 7, 21

Career history
- 2005–2006: Boncourt
- 2007: Boncourt
- 2007–2009: Idaho Stampede
- 2009–2011: GasTerra Flames
- 2011–2014: Idaho Stampede

Career highlights
- DBL champion (2010); NBA D-League champion (2008); 2x WAC All-Defensive Team (2004–2005)

Jason Ellis (born December 15, 1982) is a retired American professional basketball player. He played five seasons with Idaho Stampede of the NBA D-League, two seasons for GasTerra Flames and two seasons with Boncourt. He played college basketball for Boise State University.

== Professional career ==
After going undrafted in the 2005 NBA draft, Ellis joined the Denver Nuggets for the 2005 NBA Summer League. He later signed with BC Boncourt of Switzerland for the 2005–06 season.

In July 2006, Ellis re-joined the Denver Nuggets for the 2006 NBA Summer League. In April 2007, he re-signed with BC Boncourt for the 2007 LNA play-offs.

On November 1, 2007, Ellis was selected in the sixth round of the 2007 NBA D-League draft by the Idaho Stampede. The Stampede went on to win the 2008 NBA D-League championship. In 2007–08, he played 37 games for Idaho, averaging 5.4 points and 5.1 rebounds per game. In 2008–09, he played 48 games for the Stampede, averaging 6.9 points and 8.7 rebounds per game.

In July 2009, Ellis joined the New Jersey Nets / Philadelphia 76ers combined team for the 2009 NBA Summer League. On July 4, 2009, he signed a one-year deal with GasTerra Flames of the Netherlands. In June 2010, he re-signed with GasTerra. In July 2010, he joined the Sacramento Kings for the 2010 NBA Summer League.

On November 3, 2011, Ellis was selected in the second round of the 2011 NBA D-League draft by the Idaho Stampede. On December 12, 2011, he was waived by the Stampede due to a season-ending injury. In November 2012, he was re-acquired by the Stampede.

In July 2013, Ellis joined the New Orleans Pelicans for the 2013 NBA Summer League but did not end up making an appearance for them. In November 2013, he was again re-acquired by the Stampede.

On 28 August 2014, his retirement was announced.
