= 2014–15 Boise State Broncos men's basketball team =

American college basketball season

2014–15 Boise State Broncos men's basketball

Mountain West regular season co–champions

NCAA tournament, First Four
- Conference: Mountain West Conference
- Record: 25–9 (14–4 MW)
- Head coach: Leon Rice (5th season)
- Assistant coaches: Jeff Linder; John Rillie; Danny Henderson
- Home arena: Taco Bell Arena

2014–15 Mountain West Conference men's basketball standings
	Conf.				Overall
Team	W		L	PCT	W		L	PCT
Boise State	14	–	4	.778	25	–	9	.735
San Diego State	14	–	4	.778	27	–	9	.750
Colorado State	13	–	5	.722	27	–	7	.794
Wyoming †	11	–	7	.611	25	–	10	.714
Utah State	11	–	7	.611	18	–	13	.581
Fresno State	10	–	8	.556	15	–	17	.469
UNLV	8	–	10	.444	18	–	15	.545
New Mexico	7	–	11	.389	15	–	16	.484
Air Force	6	–	12	.333	14	–	17	.452
Nevada	5	–	13	.278	9	–	22	.290
San Jose State*	0	–	18	.000	2	–	28	.067
† 2015 MWC tournament winner *Ineligible for postseason play due to APR penalties

The 2014–15 Boise State Broncos men's basketball team represented Boise State University during the 2014–15 NCAA Division I men's basketball season. The Broncos, led by fifth year head coach Leon Rice, played their home games at Taco Bell Arena and were a member of the Mountain West Conference. They finished the season 25–9, 14–4 in Mountain West play to win a share of the Mountain West regular season championship. They advanced to the semifinals of the Mountain West tournament where they lost to Wyoming. They received an at-large bid to the NCAA tournament where they lost in the First Four, in a de facto road game, to Dayton.

On March 9, the team was ranked #25 in the AP poll, the first time in the program's history that it was nationally ranked.

== Previous season ==
The 2013–14 Boise State Broncos finished the season with an overall record of 21–13, 9–9 in the Mountain West to finish in a tie for fifth place. In the Mountain West Conference tournament, the Broncos defeated San Jose State and Nevada to advance to the semifinals where they lost to New Mexico. They were not invited to the NIT and, citing injuries, choose not to accept an invitation to the CBI or CIT.

== Players ==
=== Departures ===
Name	Number	Pos.	Height	Weight	Year	Hometown	Notes
Ryan Watkins	0	F	6'9"	229	Senior	Santa Clarita, CA	Graduated
Thomas Bropleh	4	F	6'5"	203	Senior	Denver, CO	Graduated
Jeff Elorriaga	11	G	6'2"	180	Senior	Portland, OR	Graduated
Edmunds Dukulis	21	F	6'9"	225	Sophomore	Riga, Latvia	Scholarship not renewed transferred to Saint Leo University
Joey Nebeker	22	F	6'7"	222	RS–Freshman	Melba, ID	Scholarship not renewed, transferred to College of Idaho

=== Incoming transfers ===
Name	Pos.	Height	Weight	Year	Hometown	Previous School
Kevin Allen	F	6'10"	240	Junior	Ecorse, MI	Pratt Community College
Montigo Alford	G	5'9"	165	Junior	Bloomington, CA	College of Southern Idaho

=== Recruiting ===
College recruiting
Name	Hometown	School	Height	Weight	Commit date
Chandler Hutchison; F	Mission Viejo, CA	Mission Viejo High School	6 ft 7 in (2.01 m)	185 lb (84 kg)	Sep 7, 2013
Chandler Hutchison; F	Recruit ratings: Scout: Rivals: (83)				
David Wacker; F	Converse, TX	Judson High School	6 ft 9 in (2.06 m)	235 lb (107 kg)	Sep 15, 2013
David Wacker; F	Recruit ratings: Scout: Rivals: (N/A)				
Zach Haney; F	Humble, TX	Atascocita High School	6 ft 11 in (2.11 m)	222 lb (101 kg)	Apr 23, 2014
Zach Haney; F	Recruit ratings: Scout: Rivals: (N/A)				
Overall recruit ranking: Scout: – Rivals: –
Note: In many cases, Scout, Rivals, 247Sports, On3, and ESPN may conflict in their listings of height and weight.; In these cases, the average was taken. ESPN grades are on a 100-point scale.; Sources: "2014 Team Ranking". Rivals.

=== Roster ===
2014–15 Boise State Broncos men's basketball team
Players
Coaches

Pos.	#	Name	Height	Weight	Year	Previous school	Hometown
G	0	Dezmyn Trent	6 ft 4 in (1.93 m)	206 lb (93 kg)	So	Henry Foss HS	Tacoma, WA
G	1	Mikey Thompson	6 ft 4 in (1.93 m)	179 lb (81 kg)	RS Jr	Canyon Springs HS	North Las Vegas, NV
G	2	Derrick Marks	6 ft 3 in (1.91 m)	210 lb (95 kg)	Sr	Plainfield Central HS	Chicago, IL
G/F	3	Anthony Drmic (injured) (redshirt)	6 ft 6 in (1.98 m)	204 lb (93 kg)	Sr	Australian Institute of Sport	Endeavour Hills, AUS
F	4	Kevin Allen	6 ft 11 in (2.11 m)	250 lb (113 kg)	Jr	Pratt CC	Ecorse, MI
G	5	Joe Hanstad	6 ft 4 in (1.93 m)	203 lb (92 kg)	Sr	Dickinson HS	Dickinson, ND
F	11	Zach Haney (redshirt)	6 ft 11 in (2.11 m)	232 lb (105 kg)	Fr	Atascocita HS	Humble, TX
G	12	Igor Hadziomerovic	6 ft 4 in (1.93 m)	214 lb (97 kg)	Sr	Australian Institute of Sport	Melbourne, AUS
F	13	Nicholas Duncan	6 ft 8 in (2.03 m)	245 lb (111 kg)	So	Australian Institute of Sport	Sydney, AUS
G	14	Chris Nealey	6 ft 2 in (1.88 m)	202 lb (92 kg)	RS Fr	Mater Dei HS	Newport Beach, CA
F	15	Chandler Hutchison	6 ft 7 in (2.01 m)	190 lb (86 kg)	Fr	Mission Viejo HS	Mission Viejo, CA
G	21	Montigo Alford	5 ft 9 in (1.75 m)	164 lb (74 kg)	Jr	CSI	Bloomington, CA
G/F	22	Rob Heyer	6 ft 3 in (1.91 m)	206 lb (93 kg)	RS Sr	Texas-Permian Basian	Worland, WY
F	23	James Webb III	6 ft 9 in (2.06 m)	202 lb (92 kg)	RS So	North Idaho College	Augusta, GA
C	33	David Wacker	6 ft 10 in (2.08 m)	238 lb (108 kg)	Fr	Judson HS	Converse, TX
F	34	Jake Ness	6 ft 8 in (2.03 m)	225 lb (102 kg)	Sr	Billings West HS	Coeur d'Alene, ID

Head coach

- Leon Rice (Washington State)

Assistant coach(es)

- Jeff Linder (Western State)
- John Rillie (Gonzaga)
- Danny Henderson (Austin College)

Legend

- (C) Team captain
- (S) Suspended
- (I) Ineligible
- (W) Walk-on
- Injured
- Current redshirt

Roster

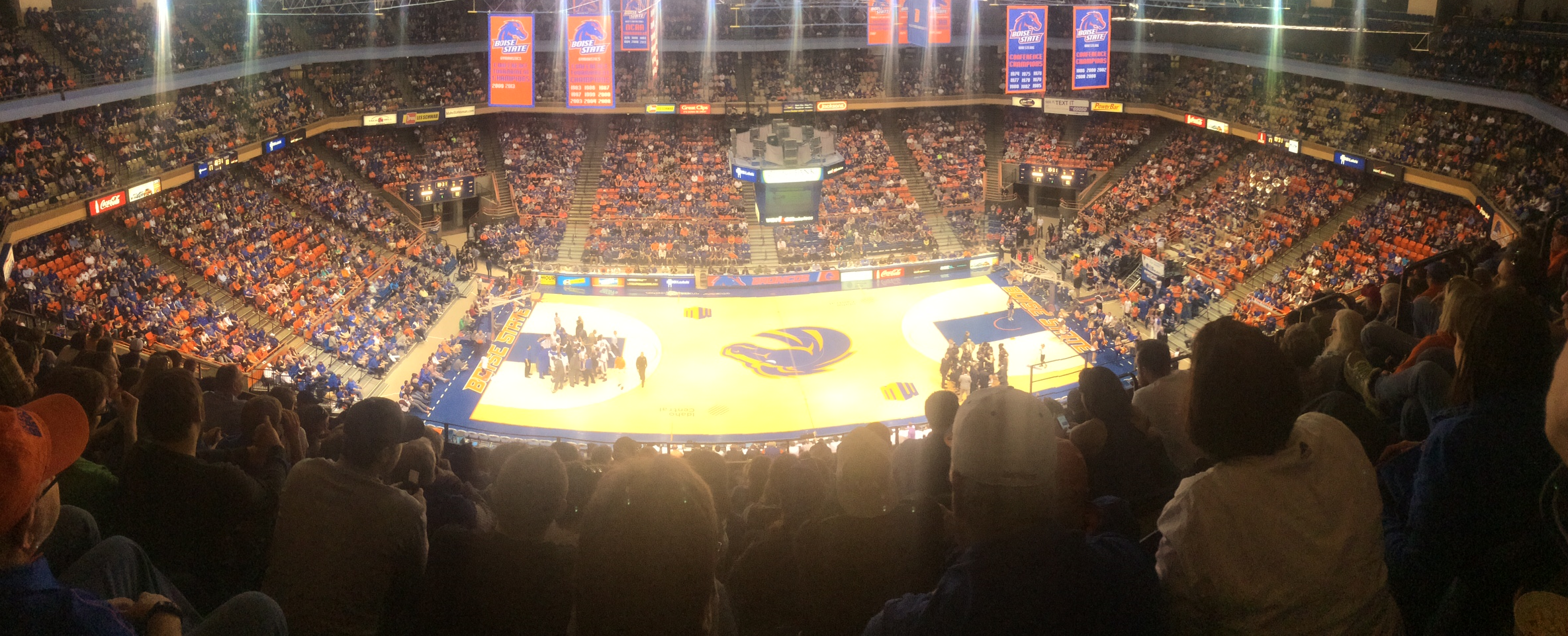
Boise State vs. San Diego State on 2/8/15 with an attendance of 10,511.

== Schedule ==
Date time, TV	Rank^{#}	Opponent^{#}	Result	Record	Site (attendance) city, state
Exhibition
Nov 1*; 6:00 pm		La Verne	W 92–60		Taco Bell Arena (3,540); Boise, ID
Nov 7*; 8:00 pm		Montana Tech	W 103–63		Taco Bell Arena (4,155); Boise, ID
Regular season
Nov 14*; 4:30 pm		vs. San Diego; LMU Classic	W 81–75	1–0	Gersten Pavilion (1,362); Los Angeles, CA
Nov 15*; 6:00 pm		at Loyola Marymount; LMU Classic	W 77–69	2–0	Gersten Pavilion (1,326); Los Angeles, CA
Nov 18*; 8:00 pm		Montana	W 72–67 ^{2OT}	3–0	Taco Bell Arena (4,535); Boise, ID
Nov 22*; 8:00 pm, BTN		at No. 3 Wisconsin	L 54–78	3–1	Kohl Center (17,279); Madision, WI
Nov 25*; 7:00 pm, 24/7		vs. Idaho	W 86–75	4–1	CenturyLink Arena (5,672); Boise, ID
Nov 28*; 5:00 pm, ESPN3		at NC State	L 54–60	4–2	PNC Arena (15,439); Raleigh, NC
Dec 6*; 9:30 pm, ESPNU		at Saint Mary's	W 82–71	5–2	McKeon Pavilion (3,008); Moraga, CA
Dec 9*; 7:00 pm		Adams State	W 78–49	6–2	Taco Bell Arena (3,452); Boise, ID
Dec 11*; 7:00 pm		Northwest Nazarene	W 91–51	7–2	Taco Bell Arena (3,558); Boise, ID
Dec 14*; 4:30 pm		Southern Utah; Las Vegas Classic	W 79–60	8–2	Taco Bell Arena (3,995); Boise, ID
Dec 20*; 11:00 am		Abilene Christian; Las Vegas Classic	W 77–33	9–2	Taco Bell Arena (3,083); Boise, ID
Dec 22*; 8:30 pm		vs. Houston; Las Vegas Classic semifinals	W 75–73 ^{OT}	10–2	Orleans Arena (N/A); Paradise, NV
Dec 23*; 9:30 pm, FS1		vs. Loyola–Chicago; Las Vegas Classic championship	L 45–48	10–3	Orleans Arena (N/A); Paradise, NV
Dec 31; 7:00 pm, RTNW		at No. 24 Colorado State	L 65–71	10–4 (0–1)	Moby Arena (5,115); Fort Collins, CO
Jan 3; 12:00 pm, RTNW		Utah State	L 61–62	10–5 (0–2)	Taco Bell Arena (5,415); Boise, ID
Jan 10; 4:00 pm, CBSSN		at Wyoming	L 54–65	10–6 (0–3)	Arena-Auditorium (7,024); Laramie, WY
Jan 13; 9:00 pm, ESPNU		UNLV	W 82–73 ^{OT}	11–6 (1–3)	Taco Bell Arena (4,387); Boise, ID
Jan 18; 4:00 pm, CBSSN		at New Mexico	W 69–59	12–6 (2–3)	The Pit (15,206); Albuquerque, NM
Jan 21; 8:00 pm, RTNW		San Jose State	W 86–36	13–6 (3–3)	Taco Bell Arena (4,219); Boise, ID
Jan 24; 12:00 pm, RTNW		at Air Force	W 77–68	14–6 (4–3)	Clune Arena (1,647); Colorado Springs, CO
Jan 27; 9:00 pm, ESPNU		Colorado State	W 82–78	15–6 (5–3)	Taco Bell Arena (5,682); Boise, ID
Feb 3; 7:30 pm, CBSSN		at Utah State	W 68–63	16–6 (6–3)	Smith Spectrum (9,378); Logan, UT
Feb 8; 4:00 pm, CBSSN		San Diego State	W 61–46	17–6 (7–3)	Taco Bell Arena (10,511); Boise, ID
Feb 11; 7:00 pm		Air Force	W 67–42	18–6 (8–3)	Taco Bell Arena (6,778); Boise, ID
Feb 14; 5:00 pm, ESPN3		at Fresno State	L 64–70	18–7 (8–4)	Save Mart Center (6,553); Fresno, CA
Feb 18; 9:00 pm, CBSSN		at UNLV	W 53–48	19–7 (9–4)	Thomas & Mack Center (13,675); Paradise, NV
Feb 21; 1:00 pm, MWN		Nevada	W 78–46	20–7 (10–4)	Taco Bell Arena (8,929); Boise, ID
Feb 24; 9:00 pm, ESPNU		New Mexico	W 76–65	21–7 (11–4)	Taco Bell Arena (4,991); Boise, ID
Feb 28; 6:00 pm, ESPN2		at No. 24 San Diego State	W 56–46	22–7 (12–4)	Viejas Arena (12,414); San Diego, CA
Mar 4; 8:30 pm, RTNW		at San Jose State	W 68–51	23–7 (13–4)	Event Center Arena (1,088); San Jose, CA
Mar 7; 6:00 pm, ESPN3		Fresno State	W 71–52	24–7 (14–4)	Taco Bell Arena (11,308); Boise, ID
Mountain West tournament
Mar 12; 1:00 pm, CBSSN	(1) No. 25	vs. (9) Air Force; Quarterfinals	W 80–68	25–7	Thomas & Mack Center (7,308); Paradise, NV
Mar 13; 7:00 pm, CBSSN	(1) No. 25	vs. (4) Wyoming; Semifinals	L 66–71 ^{OT}	25–8	Thomas & Mack Center (9,199); Paradise, NV
NCAA tournament
Mar 18; 7:10 pm, truTV	(11 E)	at (11 E) Dayton; First Four	L 55–56	25–9	UD Arena (12,592); Dayton, OH
*Non-conference game. ^{#}Rankings from AP Poll. (#) Tournament seedings in parentheses. E=East Region. All times are in Mountain Time.

== Season highs ==
Category	Amount	Player	Game
Points	31	Derrick Marks	vs. Idaho 11/25/14, vs. Utah State 01/03/15, @ New Mexico 01/18/15 and @ Fresno State 02/14/15
Rebounds	15	James Webb III	vs. UNLV 01/10/15 and vs. Air Force 02/11/15
Assists	7	Derrick Marks	@ NC State 11/28/14 and vs. Nevada 02/21/15
Steals	5	James Webb III	vs. Air Force 02/11/15
Blocks	3	Nick Duncan, James Webb III, Chandler Hutchison	Duncan vs. Montana 11/18/14, Webb vs. Utah State 01/03/15, Hutchison @ UNLV 2/18/15

== Season statistics ==
Individual Player Statistics (As of 3/11/15 with stats through the game vs. Fresno State on 3/7/15)
			Minutes		Scoring		Total FGs			3-point FGs			Free-Throws			Rebounds							
Player	GP	GS	Tot	Avg	Pts	Avg	FG	FGA	Pct	3FG	3FA	Pct	FT	FTA	Pct	Off	Def	Tot	Avg	A	TO	Blk	Stl
Alford, Montigo	27	0	322	11.9	108	4.0	39	99	.394	16	39	.410	14	24	.583	1	25	26	1.0	35	29	4	12
Allen, Kevin	20	3	163	8.2	74	3.7	30	47	.638	0	0	.000	14	23	.609	10	26	36	1.8	1	11	1	2
Drmic, Anthony	7	7	248	35.4	105	15.0	33	77	.429	16	43	.372	23	30	.767	7	28	35	5.0	11	9	0	5
Duncan, Nick	29	28	889	30.7	266	9.2	86	216	.398	66	172	.384	28	33	.848	23	77	100	3.4	26	23	13	16
Hadziomerovic, Igor	30	16	711	23.7	146	4.9	52	109	.477	15	34	.441	27	45	.600	22	74	96	3.2	82	48	6	15
Hanstad, Joe	20	4	207	10.4	43	2.2	15	42	.357	9	29	.310	4	7	.571	2	16	18	0.9	15	6	1	4
Hutchison, Chandler	26	15	292	11.2	73	2.8	25	79	.316	3	13	.231	20	31	.645	19	31	50	1.9	18	12	4	11
Hyer, Rob	31	5	627	20.2	137	4.4	46	93	.495	18	48	.375	27	32	.844	38	59	97	3.1	24	18	7	14
Marks, Derrick	29	29	902	31.1	568	19.6	210	415	.506	64	139	.460	84	105	.800	12	93	105	3.6	88	61	14	54
Nealey, Chris	7	0	19	2.7	2	0.3	0	1	.000	0	1	.000	2	2	1.000	0	1	1	0.1	1	1	0	3
Ness, Jake	19	0	86	4.5	7	0.4	2	5	.400	0	2	.000	3	4	.750	2	12	14	0.7	2	3	1	2
Thompson, Mikey	28	20	710	25.4	225	8.0	63	170	.371	11	38	.289	88	113	.779	13	53	66	2.4	54	43	0	15
Trent, Dezmyn	11	0	99	9.0	39	3.5	13	37	.351	7	21	.333	6	10	.600	5	19	25	2.2	0	7	1	2
Wacker, David	27	4	253	9.4	62	2.3	21	47	.447	0	1	.000	20	30	.667	15	26	41	1.5	5	12	4	0
Webb III, James	29	24	772	26.6	334	11.5	127	224	.567	44	103	.427	36	56	.643	55	172	227	7.8	15	27	18	33
Team																46	48	94	3.0		3		
Total	31		6300		2189	70.6	762	1661	0.459	269	683	0.394	396	545	0.727	270	760	1030	33.2	377	313	74	188
Opponents	31		6300		1850	59.7	662	1617	0.409	178	582	0.306	348	500	0.696	265	686	951	30.7	320	387	102	146

Legend
GP	Games played	GS	Games started	Avg	Average per game
FG	Field-goals made	FGA	Field-goal attempts	Off	Offensive rebounds
Def	Defensive rebounds	A	Assists	TO	Turnovers
Blk	Blocks	Stl	Steals

== Season milestones & awards ==
The 2014–15 season saw several firsts and records. The 14 conference wins is the most conference wins in school history. Their eight-game conference winning streak set a school record for consecutive conference wins. On March 9, the Broncos were ranked #25 in the AP poll marking the first time the program had ever been ranked in a major poll. Leon Rice was named the USBWA District VIII coach of the year and Derrick Marks was named to the all-district team.

=== MW awards ===
Player of the year: Derrick Marks

Newcomer of the year: James Webb III

Coach of the year: Leon Rice

Mountain West 1st team: Derrick Marks

Mountain West 2nd team: James Webb III
