= Murray Satterfield =

American basketball player and coach (1926–2013)

Biographical details
- Born: March 19, 1926; Blackfoot, Idaho, U.S.
- Died: April 24, 2013 (aged 87); Boise, Idaho, U.S.

Playing career
- 1944–1945, 1948–1949: Utah

Coaching career (HC unless noted)
- ?–1961: Wendell HS
- 1961–1965: Borah HS
- 1965–1973: Boise / Boise State
- 1975–1978: College of Idaho

Murray Satterfield (March 19, 1926 – April 24, 2013) was an American basketball coach. He was the coach of Boise State University and led their transition to a four-type year program.

A native of Blackfoot, Idaho, Satterfield played college basketball for Vadal Peterson at Utah, where in 1949 he was named to the All-Skyline Conference. Following the close of his college career, he coached high school basketball in his home state before being named head coach at Boise Junior College in 1965. Satterfield led the Broncos from the junior college ranks to the NCAA College Division to NCAA Division I in his time there, earning a College Division NCAA Tournament bid in 1970. He compiled a total record of 134–77 at Boise State.

Satterfield abruptly resigned as the Broncos head coach in-season in January, 1973. He would later coach the College of Idaho from 1975 to 1978.

Satterfield died on April 24, 2013, at age 87.
