= Wayne D. Anderson =

American college basketball coach

Wayne Anderson

Biographical details
- Born: December 10, 1930; Spokane, Washington, U.S.
- Died: January 16, 2013 (aged 82); Lewiston, Idaho, U.S.

Playing career
- 1949–1953: Idaho (football, baseball)
- Positions: Quarterback, Pitcher

Coaching career (HC unless noted)

Basketball
- 1957–1966: Idaho (assistant)
- 1966–1974: Idaho

Baseball
- 1958–1966: Idaho

Football
- 1957–1960: Idaho (assistant)

Administrative career (AD unless noted)
- 1971–1974: Idaho (assistant)
- 1982–1994: Idaho (assistant)

Head coaching record
- Overall: 87–116 (.429) – basketball

Accomplishments and honors

Championships
- Big Sky: 1964, 1966 (baseball)

Awards
- Big Sky: coach of the year – baseball: 1966 – basketball: 1968

Wayne Delbert Anderson (December 10, 1930 – January 16, 2013) was an American college basketball coach, the head coach for eight seasons at the University of Idaho, his alma mater. He was also the head baseball coach at Idaho for nine seasons, and the assistant athletic director for fifteen years.

== Playing career ==
Born and raised in Spokane, Washington, Anderson graduated from Rogers High School in 1949, where he was a multi-sport star for the Pirates. He enrolled at the University of Idaho in Moscow, ninety miles (140 km) south, and was a two-sport athlete for the Vandals, then a member of the Pacific Coast Conference.

Anderson was the starting quarterback and nationally ranked punter on the football team and a pitcher on the baseball team (and also played basketball as a freshman). He was a member of Delta Chi fraternity, and was elected class president as a senior.

== Coaching ==
Following graduation in 1953, Anderson coached a year in Roseburg, Oregon, and then served two years in the U.S. Army. He returned to the university in 1956 to run its intramural program and work on his master's degree. In the summer of 1957, Anderson was promoted to assistant coach in basketball and football, and became the head baseball coach for the 1958 season, switching positions with Clem Parberry.

=== Baseball ===
The baseball team won the inaugural Big Sky title in 1964, and again in 1966, led by starting pitchers Bill Stoneman and Frank Reberger. The 1966 team was 31–7 in the regular season and made the NCAA tournament for the first time; the Vandals eliminated Colorado State College and Air Force with three straight victories on the road in Greeley, Colorado. One step from the College World Series in Omaha, the Vandals fell 3–2 and 8–5 to Arizona in Tucson in the District 7 finals, today's "super-regionals" (sweet 16). Idaho finished the season at 34–9 (.791) and Anderson was named Big Sky baseball coach of the year.

=== Basketball ===
That September, Anderson was promoted to head coach in basketball, and stopped coaching baseball. While head baseball coach, he had been an assistant in basketball for eight years under the previous four head coaches. In his second season in 1968, he was named conference coach of the year. In 1971, he took on additional duties as assistant athletic director. After his eighth season as head basketball coach, Anderson resigned both positions in March 1974 and stopped coaching at age 43. He returned to the university in 1982 as the assistant athletic director, and stayed for another dozen years, retiring in December 1994.

Anderson was inducted into the Idaho Athletic Hall of Fame and the University of Idaho's Athletic Hall of Fame.

== Death ==
After a battle with cancer, Anderson died at age 82 at St. Joseph Regional Medical Center in Lewiston in early 2013.

== Head coaching record ==
=== Basketball ===
Record table
Season	Team	Overall	Conference	Standing	Postseason
Idaho Vandals (Big Sky Conference) (1966–1974)
1966–67	Idaho	13–10	5–5	3rd	
1967–68	Idaho	15–11	9–6	2nd	
1968–69	Idaho	11–15	6–9	3rd	
1969–70	Idaho	10–15	6–9	4th	
1970–71	Idaho	14–12	8–6	2nd	
1971–72	Idaho	5–20	2–12	8th	
1972–73	Idaho	7–19	3–11	7th	
1973–74	Idaho	12–14	5–9	6th	
Idaho:		87–116	44–67		
Total:		87–116			
