= Leon Rice =

American basketball coach (born 1963)

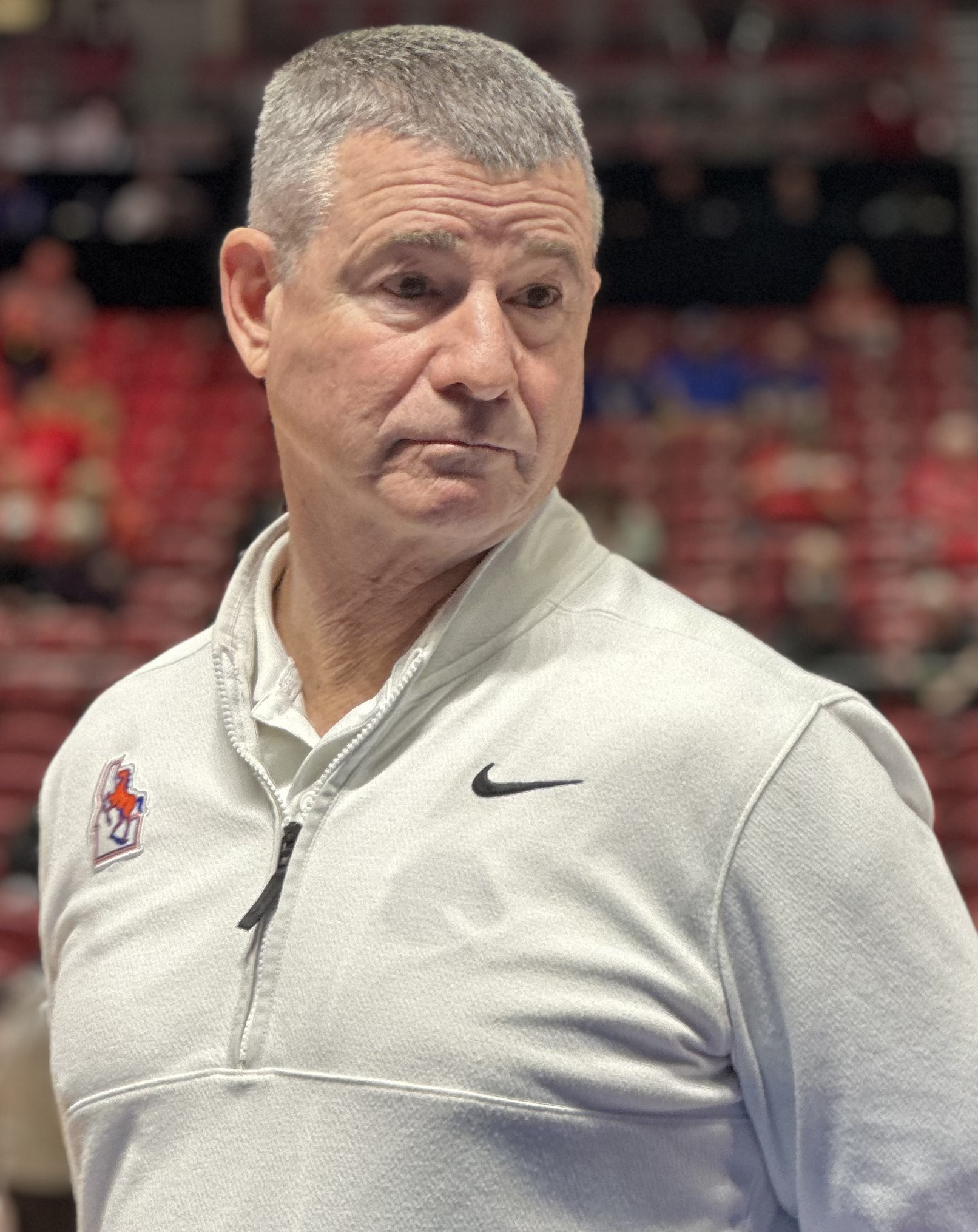
- Rice in February 2025

Current position
- Title: Head coach
- Team: Boise State
- Conference: Pac-12
- Record: 336–189 (.640)

Biographical details
- Born: November 25, 1963 (age 62); Richland, Washington, U.S.
- Education: Washington State ('86)

Coaching career (HC unless noted)
- 1989–1992: Oregon (assistant)
- 1992–1994: Northern Colorado (assistant)
- 1996–1998: Yakima Valley CC (assistant)
- 1998–1999: Yakima Valley CC
- 1999–2010: Gonzaga (assistant)
- 2010–present: Boise State

Head coaching record
- Overall: 336–189 (.640)
- Tournaments: 0–5 (NCAA Division I); 3–3 (NIT); 2–1 (CBI); 2–1 (CBC)

Accomplishments and honors

Championships
- MWC tournament (2022); 2 MWC regular season (2015, 2022)

Awards
- 2× MWC Coach of the Year (2015, 2022)

Leon Paul Rice (born November 25, 1963) is an American college basketball coach, and the head men's basketball coach at Boise State University, which is leaving the Mountain West Conference in July 2026 to join the Pac-12 Conference. He replaced Greg Graham as head coach of the Broncos on March 26, 2010.

In his first season, Rice led Boise State to the finals of the WAC tournament and to the semifinals of the College Basketball Invitational. He is the first Boise State head coach to win twenty games in two of his first three seasons and has twenty or more wins in nine of his twelve years. In 2013, he guided the Broncos to their first ever at-large bid to the NCAA tournament. In 2015, he led the Broncos to their only Mountain West regular season championship, Boise State's first conference title since 2008, and was named the MWC coach of the year. On February 13, 2021, Rice became the winningest head coach in Boise State history with his 214th victory.

Previously an assistant coach at Gonzaga for eleven seasons, Rice was newly promoted head coach Mark Few's first outside hire in July 1999. He is cited by Few as being instrumental to the Bulldogs' current and past success. According to Few, Rice occasionally created stories about what student sections for opposing teams were saying about Gonzaga star Adam Morrison as a way to pump him up prior to games.

On May 5, 2022, Rice was named as an assistant coach for Team USA and the team won a 2022 FIBA Under-18 Americas Championship.

== Head coaching record ==
Record table
Season	Team	Overall	Conference	Standing	Postseason
Boise State Broncos (Western Athletic Conference) (2010–2011)
2010–11	Boise State	22–13	10–6	2nd	CBI semifinals
Boise State Broncos (Mountain West Conference) (2011–2026)
2011–12	Boise State	13–17	3–11	T–7th	
2012–13	Boise State	21–11	9–7	T–4th	NCAA First Four
2013–14	Boise State	21–13	9–9	T–5th	
2014–15	Boise State	25–9	14–4	T–1st	NCAA First Four
2015–16	Boise State	20–12	11–7	3rd	
2016–17	Boise State	20–12	12–6	3rd	NIT second round
2017–18	Boise State	23–9	13–5	2nd	NIT first round
2018–19	Boise State	13–20	7–11	T–7th	
2019–20	Boise State	20–12	11–7	T–5th	
2020–21	Boise State	19–9	14–6	4th	NIT quarterfinal
2021–22	Boise State	27–8	15–3	1st	NCAA Round of 64
2022–23	Boise State	24–10	13–5	T–2nd	NCAA Round of 64
2023–24	Boise State	22–11	13–5	T–2nd	NCAA First Four
2024–25	Boise State	26–11	14–6	T–4th	CBC Semifinals
2025–26	Boise State	20–12	12–8	T–5th	
Boise State Broncos (Pac-12 Conference) (2026–present)
2026–27	Boise State				
Boise State:		336–189 (.640)	180–106 (.629)		
Total:		336–189 (.640)			
National champion Postseason invitational champion Conference regular season champion Conference regular season and conference tournament champion Division regular season champion Division regular season and conference tournament champion Conference tournament champion

== Personal ==
Born in Richland, Washington, Rice graduated from Columbia Basin College, a junior college where he played football, followed by Washington State University in Pullman in 1986 with a degree in physical education. He later earned a master's in athletic administration from the University of Oregon in Eugene.

Rice and his wife, Robin, have three boys together, Brock, Max, and Kade. The eldest, Brock, completed his freshman basketball season at Northwest Christian University, where he averaged 5.1 points off the bench for the Bearcats. Max played for his dad at Boise State from 2018–2024, as well as Kade who played his freshman season for his dad before transferring to Salt Lake City Community College.
