= 1986–87 Idaho State Bengals men's basketball team =

American college basketball season

1986–87 Idaho State Bengals men's basketball
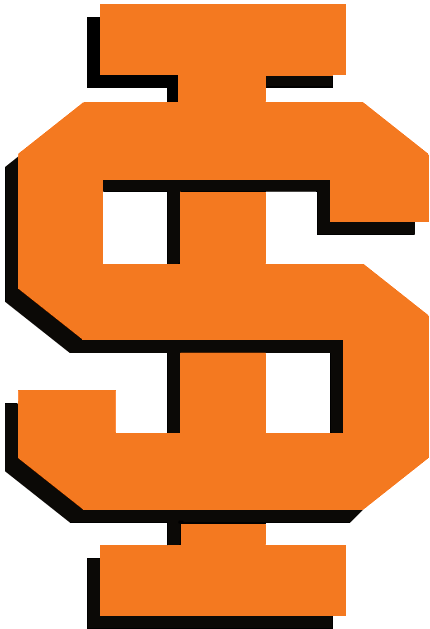

Big Sky tournament champions

NCAA tournament, First Round
- Conference: Big Sky Conference
- Record: 15–16 (5–9 Big Sky)
- Head coach: Jim Boutin (2nd season)
- Home arena: ISU Minidome

1986–87 Big Sky men's basketball standings
	Conf.				Overall
Team	W		L	PCT	W		L	PCT
Montana State	12	–	2	.857	21	–	8	.724
Boise State	10	–	4	.714	22	–	8	.733
Montana	8	–	6	.571	18	–	11	.621
Nevada	7	–	7	.500	15	–	15	.500
Northern Arizona	5	–	9	.357	11	–	17	.393
Idaho	5	–	9	.357	16	–	14	.533
Idaho State †	5	–	9	.357	15	–	16	.484
Weber State	4	–	10	.286	7	–	22	.241
† Conference tournament winner

The 1986–87 Idaho State Bengals men's basketball team represented Idaho State University during the 1986–87 NCAA Division I men's basketball season. Members of the Big Sky Conference, the Bengals were led by second-year head coach Jim Boutin and played their home games on campus at the ISU Minidome in Pocatello, Idaho.

The Bengals were 12–15 overall in the regular season and 5–9 in conference play, tied for fifth place. At the conference tournament in Flagstaff, Arizona, they were seeded seventh and upset second-seeded Boise State by a point in the quarterfinal round. In the semifinal the next night, Idaho State defeated sixth seed Idaho by nineteen and advanced to the final against fourth-seeded Nevada, and won by eleven.

In the 64-team NCAA tournament, ISU was seeded sixteenth in the West regional and met top-ranked UNLV (33–1) in Salt Lake City. Down by nineteen points at halftime, they lost 95–70, and ended the season at 15–16.

This was Idaho State's eleventh NCAA tournament appearance, but its first in ten years, and its most recent.

== Postseason results ==
Date time, TV	Rank^{#}	Opponent^{#}	Result	Record	Site (attendance) city, state
Big Sky tournament
Thu, March 5; 2:30 pm	(7)	vs. (2) Boise State; Quarterfinal	W 78–77	13–15	Walkup Skydome; Flagstaff, Arizona
Fri, March 6; 9:10 pm	(7)	vs. (6) Idaho; Semifinal	W 82–63	14–15	Walkup Skydome (3,527); Flagstaff, Arizona
Sat, March 7; 9:10 pm, ESPN	(7)	vs. (4) Nevada; Final	W 92–81	15–15	Walkup Skydome (3,752); Flagstaff, Arizona
NCAA tournament
Thu, March 12*; 2:37 pm, ESPN	(16 W)	vs. (1 W) No. 1 UNLV; First round	L 70–95	15–16	Special Events Center (11,314); Salt Lake City, Utah
*Non-conference game. ^{#}Rankings from AP poll. (#) Tournament seedings in parentheses. All times are in Mountain time.
