= 1970–71 Idaho State Bengals men's basketball team =

American college basketball season

1970–71 Idaho State Bengals men's basketball
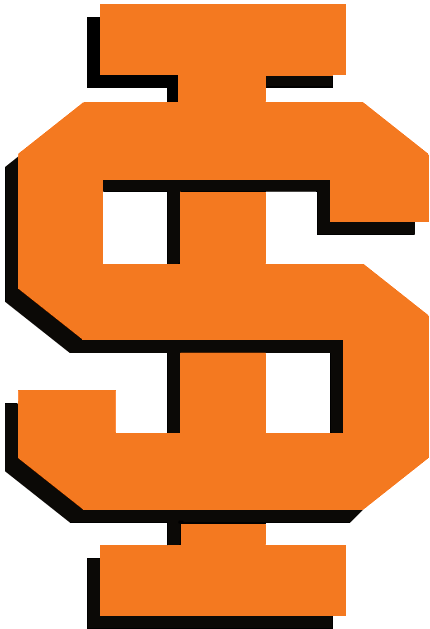
- Conference: Big Sky Conference
- Record: 9–15 (7–7 Big Sky)
- Head coach: Dan Miller (4th season)
- Home arena: ISU Minidome

1970–71 Big Sky men's basketball standings
	Conf.				Overall
Team	W		L	PCT	W		L	PCT
Weber State	12	–	2	.857	21	–	6	.778
Idaho	8	–	6	.571	14	–	11	.560
Montana State	8	–	6	.571	10	–	13	.435
Idaho State	7	–	7	.500	9	–	15	.375
Gonzaga	6	–	8	.429	12	–	13	.480
Montana	6	–	8	.429	8	–	16	.333
Boise State	5	–	9	.357	10	–	16	.385
Northern Arizona	4	–	10	.286	6	–	19	.240

The 1970–71 Idaho State Bengals men's basketball team represented Idaho State University during the 1970–71 NCAA University Division basketball season. Led by fourth-year head coach Dan Miller, the Bengals played their home games on campus at the new ISU Minidome in Pocatello.

Idaho State finished the regular season at 9–15 overall, with a 7–7 record in the Big Sky Conference.

Senior guard Willie Humes averaged over 34 points per game and was again unanimously selected to the all-conference team.

Miller was dismissed after the season in March, succeeded by Jim Killingsworth, the head coach for seven seasons at Cerritos College in southern California, where he compiled a 157–46 (.773) record and led the Falcons to the 1968 California junior college championship.
