= Derrick Marks =

American basketball player (born 1993)

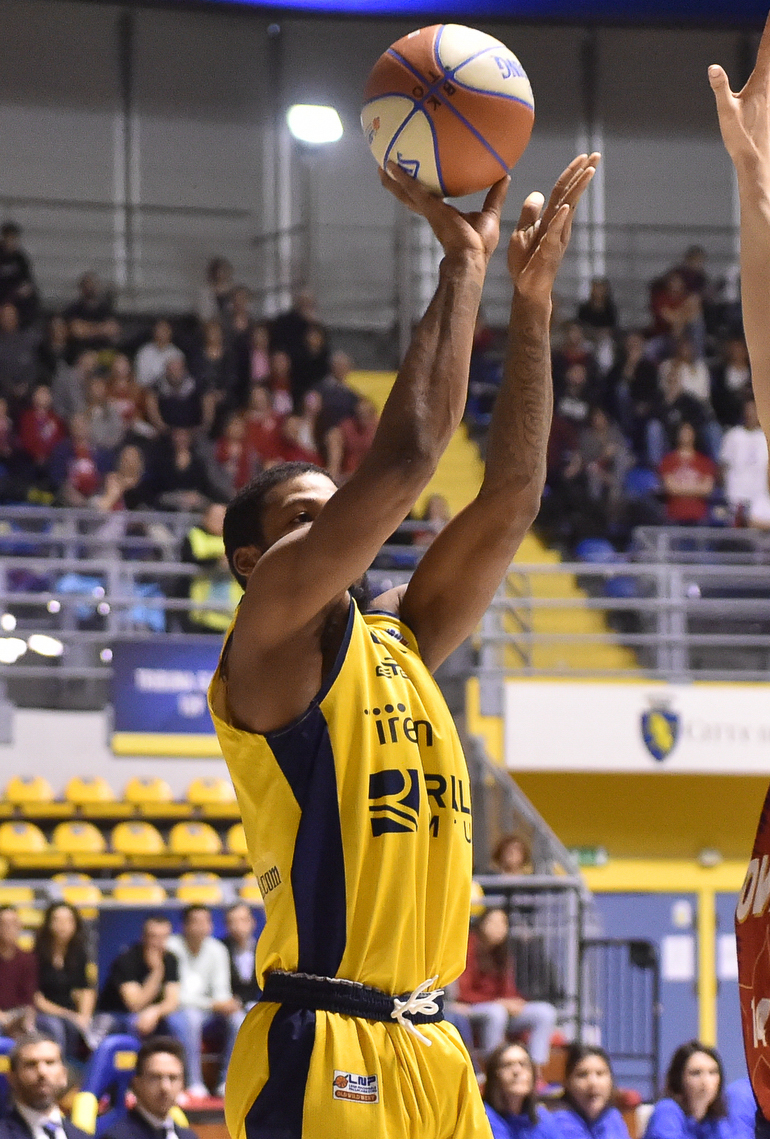
- Marks in 2020

No. 42 – CS Dinamo București
- Position: Shooting guard
- League: Liga Națională

Personal information
- Born: September 14, 1993 (age 33) Chicago, Illinois, U.S.
- Listed height: 6 ft 3 in (1.91 m)
- Listed weight: 210 lb (95 kg)

Career information
- High school: Plainfield Central (Chicago, Illinois)
- College: Boise State (2011–2015)
- NBA draft: 2015: undrafted
- Playing career: 2015–present

Career history
- 2015–2016: Orsi Derthona
- 2016–2017: Basket Ravenna
- 2017–2018: Erie BayHawks
- 2018: Crailsheim Merlins
- 2018–2019: Manisa B.B.
- 2019–2020: Basket Torino
- 2020–2021: Pistoia Basket
- 2021–2022: BC Balkan Botevgrad
- 2022–2023: Tramec Cento
- 2023–2024: Rinascita Basket Rimini
- 2024: UEB Cividale
- 2024–2025: UCC Assigeco Piacenza
- 2025–present: Dinamo București

Career highlights
- MWC Player of the Year (2015); First-team All-MWC (2015)

Derrick Marks (born September 14, 1993) is an American basketball player for Dinamo București of the Liga Națională. He played college basketball for the Boise State Broncos.

== College career ==
Marks was part of two Bronco teams to reach the NCAA Tournament in his 4 years at Boise State. As a senior in 2014–15, Marks averaged 21.3 points per game, leading the Mountain West Conference. Marks was named the Mountain West Player of the Year that year.

== Professional career ==
In the summer of 2015 it was announced that Marks would join the Philadelphia 76ers summer league team. However, he never did play in the summer league and eventually signed with Orsi Derthona Basket in Italy. During his rookie season, he averaged 13.7 points, 3.6 rebounds and 1.5 assists per game. For the following season, he signed with Basket Ravenna.

In 2018, Marks signed with Manisa B.B. in Turkey. He posted the best statistics of his professional career, averaging 18.9 points, 4.2 assists, and 4.0 rebounds per game while completing his Boise State coursework.

Marks signed with Basket Torino of the Italian Serie A2 Basket in 2019. He averaged 15.2 points per game and was shooting 50.0% from the field before the season was ended due to the COVID-19 pandemic.

On July 29, 2020, Marks signed a one-year deal with Pistoia Basket 2000. On August 31, 2021, he signed with BC Balkan Botevgrad of the Bulgarian National Basketball League.
