= 1986–87 Boise State Broncos men's basketball team =

American college basketball season

1986–87 Boise State Broncos men's basketball
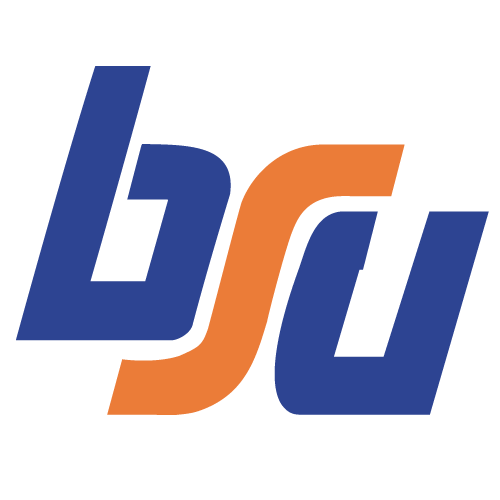

National Invitation Tournament, Second round
- Conference: Big Sky Conference
- Record: 22–8 (10–4 Big Sky)
- Head coach: Bobby Dye (4th season)
- Assistant coach: Rod Jensen
- Home arena: BSU Pavilion

1986–87 Big Sky men's basketball standings
	Conf.				Overall
Team	W		L	PCT	W		L	PCT
Montana State	12	–	2	.857	21	–	8	.724
Boise State	10	–	4	.714	22	–	8	.733
Montana	8	–	6	.571	18	–	11	.621
Nevada	7	–	7	.500	15	–	15	.500
Northern Arizona	5	–	9	.357	11	–	17	.393
Idaho	5	–	9	.357	16	–	14	.533
Idaho State †	5	–	9	.357	15	–	16	.484
Weber State	4	–	10	.286	7	–	22	.241
† Conference tournament winner

The 1986–87 Boise State Broncos men's basketball team represented Boise State University during the 1986–87 NCAA Division I men's basketball season. The Broncos were led by fourth-year head coach Bobby Dye and played their home games on campus at the BSU Pavilion in Boise, Idaho.

They finished the regular season at 21–6 overall, with a 10–4 record in the Big Sky Conference, second in the standings. In the conference tournament in Flagstaff, Arizona, the second-seeded Broncos were upset by a point by eventual champion Idaho State in the quarterfinal round.

In the National Invitation Tournament, the Broncos hosted Utah of the WAC, and won by a point. At Seattle in the second round, BSU fell to Washington of the Pac-10 by five points.

The Broncos were led on the floor by sophomore point guard Chris Childs and junior forward Arnell Jones.

== Postseason results ==
Date time, TV	Rank^{#}	Opponent^{#}	Result	Record	Site (attendance) city, state
Big Sky tournament
Thu, March 5; 2:30 pm	(2)	vs. (7) Idaho State; Quarterfinal	L 77–78	21–7	Walkup Skydome (9,027); Flagstaff, Arizona
National Invitation tournament
Wed, March 11*; 7:30 pm		Utah; First round	W 62–61	22–7	BSU Pavilion (10,003); Boise, Idaho
Mon, March 16*; 8:30 pm		at Washington; Second round	L 68–73	22–8	Hec Edmundson Pavilion (4,480); Seattle, Washington
*Non-conference game. ^{#}Rankings from AP poll. (#) Tournament seedings in parentheses. All times are in Mountain time.
