= Roberto Bergersen =

American basketball player (born 1976)

Boise State Broncos
- Title: Assistant coach
- League: Mountain West Conference

Personal information
- Born: January 6, 1976 (age 50) Seattle, Washington, U.S.
- Listed height: 6 ft 6 in (1.98 m)
- Listed weight: 210 lb (95 kg)

Career information
- High school: Decatur (Federal Way, Washington)
- College: Washington (1994–1995); College of Southern Idaho (1995–1996); Boise State (1996–1999)
- NBA draft: 1999: 2nd round, 52nd overall pick
- Drafted by: Atlanta Hawks
- Playing career: 1999–2010
- Position: Small forward / shooting guard
- Number: 11
- Coaching career: 2021–present

Career history

Playing
- 1999–2001: Idaho Stampede
- 2001: JDA Dijon
- 2001–2002: Olimpia Milano
- 2002: Limoges CSP
- 2002–2003: JDA Dijon
- 2003–2004: Idaho Stampede
- 2004: Dodge City Legend
- 2004–2005: Belfius Mons-Hainaut
- 2005: Caja Rural Melilla
- 2005–2006: Pınar Karşıyaka
- 2006: Palma Aqua Magica
- 2006: Wonju Dongbu Promy
- 2007–2010: Idaho Stampede

Coaching
- 2021–2022: Eastern Washington (assistant)
- 2022–present: Boise State (assistant)

Career highlights
- NBA D-League champion (2008); TBL All-Star (2006); CBA All-Star Game MVP (2004); No. 11 retired by Idaho Stampede; Big West Player of the Year (1999); 2x First-team All-Big West (1998, 1999)
- Stats at Basketball Reference

Roberto Bergersen (born January 6, 1976) is an American former professional basketball player who played the majority of his career for the Idaho Stampede in the Continental Basketball Association and the NBA Development League. A 6'6" swingman from Boise State University, he was selected by the Atlanta Hawks with the 52nd overall pick of the 1999 NBA draft. His rights were later traded to the Portland Trail Blazers, where he signed with them but was released before playing in a regular season game for them.

On November 14, 2014, Bergersen's number 11 jersey was retired by the Idaho Stampede.

Bergersen currently resides in Boise, Idaho with his family and is an assistant coach at Boise State University.
