= Boise State Broncos men's basketball =

Men's college basketball team

2026–27 Boise State Broncos men's basketball team
- University: Boise State University
- Head coach: Leon Rice (17th season)
- Location: Boise, Idaho
- Arena: ExtraMile Arena (capacity: 15,148)
- Conference: Pac-12
- Nickname: Broncos
- Colors: Blue and orange
- Student section: The Corral
- All-time record: 990–737 (.573)

NCAA Division I tournament round of 32
- 1970*, 1976

NCAA Division I tournament appearances
- 1970*, 1976, 1988, 1993, 1994, 2008, 2013, 2015, 2022, 2023, 2024

Conference tournament champions
- Mountain West - 2022 WAC - 2008 Big Sky - 1976, 1988, 1993, 1994

Conference regular-season champions
- Mountain West - 2015, 2022 WAC - 2008 Big Sky - 1976, 1988, 1989

Conference division champions
- Big West East Division - 1999

Uniforms
Home	Away
Alternate	Alternate
- * at Division II level

The Boise State Broncos men's basketball team represents Boise State University in the Pac-12 Conference. The Broncos are led by head coach Leon Rice, hired in March 2010, and play their home games on campus at ExtraMile Arena in Boise, Idaho. BSU's most recent appearance in the NCAA tournament was in 2024.

== History ==
=== Greg Graham era ===
Athletic director Gene Bleymaier hired Greg Graham to be head coach in 2002. In eight seasons, Graham had a 142–112 record at Boise State and led Boise State to a berth in the 2004 NIT, 2008 NCAA tournament and 2009 CBI. For leading Boise State to the NCAA tournament, the Western Athletic Conference named Graham "Coach of the Year" in 2008.

In 2010, after a 15–17 season, Bleymaier fired Graham and stated: "We appreciate everything that Coach Graham and his staff have contributed to Boise State the past eight years. We felt that in the best interest of the program we needed to make a change."

=== Leon Rice era ===
Leon Rice replaced Graham as head coach of the Broncos on March 26, 2010. In his first season as head coach, he led Boise State to the finals of the 2011 WAC men's basketball tournament and to the semifinals of the 2011 College Basketball Invitational. He is the first Boise State head coach to win 20 games in two of his first three seasons and has 20 or more wins in eight of his ten seasons. In 2013, he guided the Broncos to their first ever at-large bid to the NCAA tournament. In 2015, he led the Broncos to their first ever Mountain West Conference regular season championship, and first conference title for Boise State since 2008, and was named the Mountain West coach of the year. On February 13, 2021, Rice won his 214th game to become the winningest head coach in Boise State history. In 2022, Leon Rice led Boise to arguably their best season in school history. The Broncos won a program high 27 games, 15 conference games, the Mountain West conference regular season championship, Mountain West conference tournament, an 8-seed in the NCAA tournament and the highest AP ranking in program history at 23. The following season, Leon Rice helped lead the team to 24 wins and consecutive tournament bids for the second time in school history. In 2024, Leon Rice became the first coach in program history to lead the Broncos to three consecutive NCAA Tournament appearances.

== In-season tournament championships ==
- 1984–85 Gem State Classic (wins over Northwest Nazarene, Idaho State)
- 1986–87 Real Dairy Classic (wins over College of Idaho, Idaho State)
- 1986–87 Albertson's Holiday Classic (wins over Southwest Texas State, San Diego)
- 1987–88 Real Dairy Classic (wins over Lewis-Clark State, Idaho State)
- 1987–88 Albertson's Holiday Classic (wins over Sam Houston State, St. Mary's (CA))
- 1988–89 Real Dairy Classic (wins over Northwest Nazarene, Idaho State)
- 1988–89 Albertson's Holiday Classic (wins over Portland, Wisconsin–Green Bay)
- 1990–91 Real Dairy Classic (wins over Valparaiso, Idaho State)
- 1990–91 Albertson's Holiday Classic (wins over Monmouth, Georgia Southern)
- 1991–92 Real Dairy Classic (wins over Sacramento State, Stephen F. Austin State)
- 1991–92 Albertson's Holiday Classic (wins over Air Force, Western Michigan)
- 1992–93 Real Dairy Classic (wins over Elizabeth City State, Georgia State)
- 1992–93 Albertson's Holiday Classic (wins over George Mason, Southern Utah)
- 1993–94 Real Dairy Classic (wins over Siena, Illinois–Chicago)
- 1994–95 Albertson's Holiday Classic (wins over Bucknell, Davidson)
- 1996–97 Albertson's Holiday Classic (wins over Campbell, Gonzaga)

== Regular season conference titles ==
- Big Sky (3): 1976, 1988, 1989
- Big West (1): 1999 (East)
- Western Athletic (1): 2008
- Mountain West (2): 2015, 2022

== Conference tournament championships ==
- Big Sky (4): 1976, 1988, 1993, 1994
- Western Athletic (1): 2008
- Mountain West (1): 2022

== Conference Player of the Year awards ==
- Big Sky (2): Arnell Jones (1988), Chris Childs (1989)
- Big West (1): Roberto Bergersen (1999)
- Mountain West (1): Derrick Marks (2015)

== Postseason results ==
=== NCAA Division I Tournament results ===
The Broncos have appeared in ten NCAA Division I Tournaments, with a combined record of 0–10. They have the most NCAA tournament games played without a win (Iona had a win in the NCAA Tournament in 1980 before the NCAA stripped it away due to a violation, which means they are "0-15"). Their first five bids came via conference tournament championships, the first four in the Big Sky. The bid to the First Four in 2013 was the first at-large bid in program history, and they received a second in 2015. BSU made their eighth appearance in 2022 and returned the following year. Boise State set a new program record with three consecutive NCAA tournament appearances in 2024.

Year	Seed	Round	Opponent	Result
1976		Round of 32	#4 UNLV	L 78–103
1988	14 W	Round of 64	(3) #10 Michigan	L 58–63
1993	14 W	Round of 64	(3) #8 Vanderbilt	L 72–92
1994	14 W	Round of 64	(3) #10 Louisville	L 58–67
2008	14 E	Round of 64	(3) #13 Louisville	L 61–79
2013	13 W	First Four	(13) La Salle	L 71–80
2015	11 E	First Four	(11) Dayton	L 55–56
2022	8 W	Round of 64	(9) Memphis	L 53–64
2023	10 W	Round of 64	(7) Northwestern	L 67–75
2024	10 S	First Four	(10) Colorado	L 53–60

NCAA Tournament seeding history

The NCAA began seeding the tournament with the 1979 edition.

Years →	'88	'92	'94	'08	'13	'15	'22	'23	'24
Seeds→	14	14	14	14	13	11	8	10	10

=== NCAA Division II Tournament results ===
The Broncos appeared in one NCAA Division II tournament (referred to at the time as the College Division), with a 1–1 record.

Year	Round	Opponent	Result
1970	Regional semifinals Regional 3rd Place	UC Riverside; Sacramento State	L 81–83; W 63–61

=== NIT results ===
The Broncos have appeared in seven National Invitational Tournaments (NIT), with a combined record of 5–7.

Year	Round	Opponent	Result
1987	First round Second Round	Utah; Washington	W 62–61; L 68–73
1989	First round	Oklahoma State	L 55–69
1991	First round	Southern Illinois	L 74–75
2004	Opening Round; First round Second Round	UNLV; Milwaukee; Marquette	W 84–69; W 73–70; L 53–56
2017	First round Second Round	Utah; Illinois	W 73–68; L 56–71
2018	First round	Washington	L 74–77
2021	First round Quarterfinals	SMU; Memphis	W 85–84; L 56–59

=== CBI results ===
The Broncos have appeared in two College Basketball Invitationals (CBI), with a combined record of 2–2.

Year	Round	Opponent	Result
2009	First round	Stanford	L 76–96
2011	First round Quarterfinals; Semifinals	Austin Peay; Evansville; Oregon	W 83–80; W 75–69; L 71–79

=== CBC results ===
The Broncos have appeared in the College Basketball Crown (CBC) once. Their record is 2–1.

Year	Round	Opponent	Result
2025	First round Quarterfinals; Semifinals	George Washington; Butler; Nebraska	W 89–59; W 100–93; L 69–79

== Notable alumni ==
- Gus Johnson – F/C, 1961–1962, Baltimore Bullets, Phoenix Suns, Indiana Pacers. Five time NBA All-Star. Two-time NBA All-Defensive First Team. ABA Champion. #25 retired by the Washington Wizards. Inducted posthumously into the Naismith Memorial Basketball Hall of Fame in 2010. Played sophomore season at Boise Junior College and junior season at the University of Idaho, then was selected tenth overall in the 1963 NBA draft.
- Clyde Dickey – G, 1970–1973. Drafted by the Phoenix Suns. Played for the Utah Stars of the ABA.
- Trent Johnson – F, 1974–1978. Johnson is the former head coach of Stanford, Nevada, LSU, and TCU.
- Fred Williams – G, 1977–1979. Head coach for the Tulsa Shock of the WNBA. Former head coach of the Atlanta Dream of the WNBA. Williams was an assistant coach for the USC women's basketball team when they won national championships in 1983 and 1984.
- Bruce Bolden – F, 1981–1985, NBL Grand Final Most Valuable Player in 1992.
- Terry Lee – G, 1982–1983, Won a World Series Championship with the Cincinnati Reds in 1990.
- Chris Childs – G, 1985–1989, New Jersey Nets, New York Knicks, Toronto Raptors. Big Sky Conference Champion and Player of the Year. Won a Continental Basketball Association Championship with the Quad City Thunder in 1994 and was named the CBA Finals MVP. Played in the 1999 NBA Finals.
- Frank Robinson – G, 1989–1990, played for the Denver Broncos of the NFL.
- Vince Hizon – G/F, 1990–1991, multiple champion in the professional basketball league in the Philippines. Currently the commissioner of the Filsports Basketball Association in the Philippines.
- Tanoka Beard – F/C, 1989–1993, 2-time Spanish League MVP (Real Madrid) (2nd all-time Boise State leading scorer 1944 points).
- John Coker – C, 1993–1996, Phoenix Suns.
- Roberto Bergersen – G/F, 1996–1999, drafted by the Atlanta Hawks, traded to the Portland Trail Blazers, won the NBA Development League Championship with the Idaho Stampede in 2008. Number retired by The Idaho Stampede. Current assistant coach for Boise State Broncos men's basketball team.
- Jeb Putzier – F, 1999, played on the Bronco basketball team in his sophomore year. Played in NFL for the Denver Broncos, Houston Texans, and Seattle Seahawks.
- Bryan Defares – G, 2000–2004, won the California state basketball championship in 2000, helped lead the Broncos the 2004 NIT Sweet Sixteen, played professionally in Europe, and represented the Netherlands national basketball team for 10 years.
- Jason Ellis, F/C, 2001–2004, Helped lead the Broncos to the 2004 NIT Sweet Sixteen. NBA G-League Champion, Dutch Basketball League Champion.
- Jermaine Blackburn – G/F, 2003–2005, One of the few people in the history of professional basketball to record a Quadruple-double when he tallied 20 points, 10 rebounds, 14 assists, and 10 steals in a CBA game. He followed this performance with a triple-double in his very next game, recording 22 points, 10 rebounds and 13 assists against the same team.
- Tyler Tiedeman – F, 2005–2008, Dutch Basketball League All-Star.
- Coby Karl – G/F, 2004–2007, Karl is an assistant coach for the Philadelphia 76ers along with another Boise State University alumnus Bryan Gates. He played for Los Angeles Lakers, Cleveland Cavaliers, and the Golden State Warriors in the NBA. Former Head Coach of the NBA G League's South Bay Lakers and Delaware Blue Coats.
- Matt Bauscher – G, 2005–2008, Dutch Basketball League Champion, All-Star, and MVP.
- La'Shard Anderson – G, 2008–2011, Anderson has played in the Belgian, Tunisian, Austrian, and Dutch pro leagues.
- Robert Arnold – G/F, 2009–2011, played in France's LBN Pro A League. Finnish League MVP (2015), Finnish League champion (2015), Finnish League scoring champion (2015), 2x Austrian Cup champion (2011, 2012), Austrian Supercup champion (2011).
- Mark Sanchez – F, 2007–2009, 2008 Western Athletic Conference tournament champion. Leading scorer and rebounder for the Broncos his senior year. The 2014 Austrian League MVP. Austrian Cup and Dutch Cup Champion.
- Anthony Drmic – G/F, 2011–2016, Won the 2016–17 NBL Rookie of the Year Award in Australia's National Basketball League for the Adelaide 36ers. Third place in Boise State University's all-time scoring list after Tanoka Beard.
- James Webb III – F, 2014–2016, First Bronco basketball player to declare early for the NBA draft. Brooklyn Nets signed him to a two-way deal on January 15, 2018. Webb was selected to the USA Basketball team to represent the country in the 2022 FIBA AmeriCup qualification tournament. Team USA went undefeated and were the champions of the 2022 FIBA Americup Qualification Tournament. Plays for Baloncesto Málaga of the Spanish Liga ACB and the Champions League.
- Chandler Hutchison – G/F, 2014–2018, selected as the No. 22 pick in the first round of the 2018 NBA draft by the Chicago Bulls. He is Boise State's first ever first round pick.
- Justinian Jessup – G/F, 2016–2020, Selected as the No. 51 pick in the second round of the 2020 NBA draft by the Golden State Warriors. Before he got drafted Jessup was signed by the Illawarra Hawks of Australia's National Basketball League via their Next Stars program to help him prepare for the NBA draft. Plays for Basket Zaragoza of Liga ACB.
- Derrick Alston Jr., F, 2016–2021, Son of Derrick Alston. Plays for the Rostock Seawolves of Basketball Bundesliga.
- Abu Kigab, F, 2019–2022, Led Canada to the 2017 FIBA Under-19 Basketball World Cup Championship. Led Boise State to the Mountain West Conference outright Basketball regular season championship and the Mountain West Conference tournament championship his senior year. Named the Mountain West Conference tournament MVP his senior year. Played for the Toronto Raptors' NBA Summer League Team.
- Cam Martin, F/C, 2023-2024. Won a National Championship with the Kansas Jayhawks before transferring to Boise State. Plays for the Motor City Cruise of the NBA G-League.
- Tyson Degenhart, F, 2021-2025. Helped lead Boise State to the Mountain West Conference outright Basketball regular season championship and the Mountain West Conference tournament championship his freshman year. He is Boise State's all-time leading scorer with 2,037 points. Signed a contract with the Toronto Raptors to play for their NBA Summer League Team.
- O'Mar Stanley, F-C, 2023-2025. Used to play for St. John's Red Storm men's basketball before transferring up to Boise State. Drafted by the Motor City Cruise with the 26th pick of the 2025 NBA G League draft.
