= 1981–82 Idaho Vandals men's basketball team =

American college basketball season

1981–82 Idaho Vandals men's basketball

Big Sky champions

NCAA tournament, Sweet Sixteen
- Conference: Big Sky Conference

Ranking
- Coaches: No. 8
- AP: No. 8
- Record: 27–3 (13–1 Big Sky)
- Head coach: Don Monson (4th season)
- Assistant coaches: Barry Collier; Rod Snook
- Home arena: Kibbie Dome

1981–82 Big Sky men's basketball standings
	Conf.				Overall
Team	W		L	PCT	W		L	PCT
No. 8 Idaho †	13	–	1	.929	27	–	3	.900
Montana	10	–	4	.714	17	–	10	.630
Nevada	9	–	5	.643	19	–	9	.679
Weber State	6	–	8	.429	15	–	13	.536
Boise State	6	–	8	.429	12	–	14	.462
Idaho State	5	–	9	.357	14	–	12	.538
Montana State	5	–	9	.357	11	–	18	.379
Northern Arizona	2	–	12	.143	6	–	20	.231
† Conference tournament winner Rankings from AP poll

The 1981–82 Idaho Vandals men's basketball team represented the University of Idaho during the 1981–82 NCAA Division I men's basketball season. The defending champions of the Big Sky Conference, Vandals were led by fourth-year head coach Don Monson and played their home games on campus at the Kibbie Dome in Moscow, Idaho.

The 1982 basketball team was the most successful in the school's history, and has yet to be surpassed. Building upon the success of the previous season (25–4), the Vandals won their first sixteen games and went 24–2 in the regular season. They defeated Gonzaga and all four Pac-10 teams from the Northwest. Idaho won the eight-team Far West Classic in Portland in late December 1981, winning all three games by at least 19 points (over Iowa State, Oregon State, and Oregon).

The Vandals' only setbacks during the regular season were consecutive two-point road losses in late January. The first was to rival Montana on a raucous Saturday night in Missoula on a tip-in at the buzzer. The second was to Notre Dame in South Bend two days later, ending a three-games-in-four-nights road trip, which included multiple weather-related travel delays and re-routes, and a 4:30 am arrival in South Bend on game day. Although the Vandals hit 14 of their first 15 shots to jump to 28–10 lead over the Irish, Notre Dame regrouped at home to win by two in overtime. Idaho was awarded just four free throws in the 45 minutes of play and missed them all. Notre Dame was led by future NBA guard John Paxson in 1982. The Vandals then won eight straight games to conclude the regular season, and won the four-team conference tournament, which they hosted for the second straight year as regular season champions.

Their 26–2 record after the Big Sky tournament (& ten straight victories) earned the Vandals a #8 national ranking and a #3 seed in the West region of the 48-team NCAA tournament, which included a first round bye.

== NCAA tournament ==
Idaho's first game (in the second round) was nearly a home game, played just eight miles (13 km) west at Beasley Coliseum in Pullman on a Sunday afternoon. The opponent was 16th-ranked Iowa of the Big Ten, the region's sixth seed, then coached by Lute Olson. A Final Four team two years earlier, Iowa won their first-round game handily, but Idaho won this close game by two points, 69–67 in overtime, and advanced to the Sweet 16.

Four days later at the West regional in Provo, Utah, they met the nation's fourth-ranked team, Oregon State, the #2 seed in the West region. Idaho had defeated the Beavers by 22 points in December at the Far West Classic in Portland, but this time the result was far different, as the Beavers won 60–42. OSU was defeated two days later by the region's #1 seed Georgetown, led by freshman center Patrick Ewing. (Georgetown advanced to the national final, where they lost by a point to North Carolina.)

== Aftermath ==
The Vandals ended the 1982 season at 27–3 (.900), and were ranked as high as sixth in the nation (AP and UPI polls) at the end of the regular season at 24–2. They entered the top twenty at #18 in early January and two weeks later were up to eighth, but the two losses dropped them back to fifteenth. Eight straight wins elevated them to sixth prior to the Big Sky tournament, and were eighth in both final polls entering the NCAA tournament.

The 1982 starters Ken Owens (6 ft 0 in (1.83 m)) and Brian Kellerman (6 ft 5 in (1.96 m)) in the backcourt, with forwards Phil Hopson and Gordie Herbert and center Kelvin Smith, all at 6 ft 6 in (1.98 m). Just before their two losses in January, the team was featured in a two-page article in Sports Illustrated. (team photo) The alley-oop was a frequently used play against man-to-man defenses, and sophomore Pete Prigge (6 ft 7 in (2.01 m)) was the sixth man.

Monson was named the Kodak Coach of the Year in Division I in 1982 (photo) and rumors were rampant that he would jump to a higher league, maybe to struggling Arizona in the Pac-10. That position was eventually filled by Lute Olson (a year later), and Monson chose to stay for a fifth season at Idaho. With a salary of about $40,000 in 1982 and a one-year contract, an "appreciation fund" was set up by local fans to entice him to stay in Moscow. The 1982 team was inducted into the Vandal Athletics Hall of Fame, as was Monson, Kellerman, and Owens.

== All-conference ==
All five starters were recognized by the conference. Senior point guard Owens was the Big Sky's player of the year and a repeat MVP in the conference tournament. He was joined in the backcourt of the all-conference team by junior guard Kellerman, the previous season's player of the year. Vandals on the second team were the forwards, senior Herbert and junior Hopson; junior center Smith was honorable mention.

== Roster ==
1981–82 Idaho Vandals men's basketball team
Players
Coaches

Pos.	#	Name	Height	Weight	Year	Previous school	Hometown
G	4	Mike Maben	6 ft 3 in (1.91 m)	185 lb (84 kg)	Sr	Milwaukee Tech HS	Milwaukee, WI
G	12	Brian Kellerman	6 ft 5 in (1.96 m)	190 lb (86 kg)	Jr	Richland HS	Richland, WA
G	14	Ken Owens	6 ft 0 in (1.83 m)	180 lb (82 kg)	Sr	Treasure Valley (OR)	New York, NY
F	20	Gordon Herbert	6 ft 6 in (1.98 m)	205 lb (93 kg)	RS Sr	N.Idaho, Penticton HS	Penticton, BC
F	24	Pete Prigge	6 ft 7 in (2.01 m)	190 lb (86 kg)	So	Fort Vancouver HS	Vancouver, WA
F	30	Zane Frazier (redshirt)	6 ft 5 in (1.96 m)	205 lb (93 kg)	So	Fairfax HS	Los Angeles, CA
F	31	Antwine Murchison	6 ft 7 in (2.01 m)	190 lb (86 kg)	Fr	St. Mary's HS	Stockton, CA
G	32	Ben Ross	6 ft 4 in (1.93 m)	180 lb (82 kg)	Jr	Coeur d'Alene HS	Coeur d'Alene, ID
C	33	Kevin Haatvedt	6 ft 11 in (2.11 m)	220 lb (100 kg)	Fr	W.H. Taft HS	Woodland Hills, CA
G	34	Matt Haskins	6 ft 3 in (1.91 m)	170 lb (77 kg)	Fr	Richland HS	Richland, WA
C	40	Kelvin Smith	6 ft 6 in (1.98 m)	195 lb (88 kg)	Jr	Taft (CA), Pasco HS	Pasco, WA
G	42	Freeman Watkins	6 ft 4 in (1.93 m)	187 lb (85 kg)	So	Eisenhower HS	Utica, MI
F	44	Phil Hopson	6 ft 6 in (1.98 m)	190 lb (86 kg)	Jr	Jefferson HS	Portland, OR

Head coach

- Don Monson (Idaho)

Assistant coach(es)

- Barry Collier (Butler)
- Rod Snook (Whittier)

Legend

- (C) Team captain
- (S) Suspended
- (I) Ineligible
- (W) Walk-on
- Injured
- Current redshirt

Roster

== Schedule and results ==
Date time, TV	Rank^{#}	Opponent^{#}	Result	Record	Site (attendance) city, state
Sat, Nov 28*; 8:00 pm		Doane (NE)	W 94–56	1–0	Kibbie Dome (3,800); Moscow, Idaho
Mon, Nov 30*; 8:00 pm		Concordia (MN)	W 96–47	2–0	Kibbie Dome (3,800); Moscow, Idaho
Wed, Dec 2*; 7:30 pm		at Washington	W 86–61	3–0	Hec Edmundson Pavilion (2,329); Seattle, Washington
Sat, Dec 5*; 8:00 pm		Athletes in Action (USA) (Exhibition)	L 73–77 ^{2OT}	—	Kibbie Dome (4,800); Moscow, Idaho
Wed, Dec 9*; 7:30 pm		at Washington State; Battle of the Palouse	W 68–48	4–0	Beasley Coliseum (8,300); Pullman, Washington
Sat, Dec 12*; 8:00 pm		Western Montana	W 59–49	5–0	Kibbie Dome (4,400); Moscow, Idaho
Thu, Dec 17*; 8:00 pm		St. Martin's	W 86–53	6–0	Kibbie Dome (3,200); Moscow, Idaho
Sat, Dec 19*; 8:00 pm		at San Jose State	W 48–45	7–0	San Jose Civic Auditorium (1,040); San Jose, California
Sat, Dec 26*; 9:00 pm		vs. Iowa State; Far West Classic	W 88–68	8–0	Memorial Coliseum (11,040); Portland, Oregon
Mon, Dec 28*; 7:00 pm		vs. No. 15 Oregon State; Far West Classic (semifinal)	W 71–49	9–0	Memorial Coliseum (12,083); Portland, Oregon
Tue, Dec 29*; 9:00 pm		vs. Oregon; Far West Classic (final)	W 81–62	10–0	Memorial Coliseum (11,751); Portland, Oregon
Sat, Jan 2*; 8:00 pm		Gonzaga; Rivalry	W 65–57	11–0	Kibbie Dome (5,460); Moscow, Idaho
Thu, Jan 7; 7:30 pm	No. 18	at Nevada-Reno	W 72–66 ^{2OT}	12–0 (1–0)	Centennial Coliseum (5,867); Reno, Nevada
Sat, Jan 9; 6:30 pm	No. 18	at Northern Arizona	W 59–46	13–0 (2–0)	Walkup Skydome (4,100); Flagstaff, Arizona
Fri, Jan 15; 8:00 pm	No. 14	Idaho State	W 73–62	14–0 (3–0)	Kibbie Dome (8,500); Moscow, Idaho
Sat, Jan 16; 8:00 pm	No. 14	Weber State	W 59–44	15–0 (4–0)	Kibbie Dome (7,500); Moscow, Idaho
Fri, Jan 22; 7:00 pm	No. 8	at Montana State	W 49–38	16–0 (5–0)	Brick Breeden Fieldhouse (6,567); Bozeman, Montana
Sat, Jan 23; 7:00 pm	No. 8	at Montana	L 51–53	16–1 (5–1)	Dahlberg Arena (8,782); Missoula, Montana
Mon, Jan 25*; 5:00 pm, USA	No. 11	at Notre Dame	L 48–50 ^{OT}	16–2	Athletic & Convocation Center (11,345); Notre Dame, Indiana
Sat, Jan 30; 8:00 pm	No. 11	Boise State	W 91–59	17–2 (6–1)	Kibbie Dome (9,200); Moscow, Idaho
Fri, Feb 5; 8:00 pm	No. 15	Northern Arizona	W 72–60	18–2 (7–1)	Kibbie Dome (5,100); Moscow, Idaho
Sat, Feb 6; 8:00 pm	No. 15	Nevada-Reno	W 91–79	19–2 (8–1)	Kibbie Dome (9,500); Moscow, Idaho
Fri, Feb 12; 6:30 pm	No. 13	at Weber State	W 71–62	20–2 (9–1)	Dee Events Center (7,691); Ogden, Utah
Sat, Feb 13; 6:30 pm	No. 13	at Idaho State	W 77–50	21–2 (10–1)	ISU Minidome (6,164); Pocatello, Idaho
Thu, Feb 18; 8:00 pm	No. 11	Montana	W 71–58	22–2 (11–1)	Kibbie Dome (8,500); Moscow, Idaho
Sat, Feb 20; 8:00 pm	No. 11	Montana State	W 77–63	23–2 (12–1)	Kibbie Dome (8,500); Moscow, Idaho
Sat, Feb 27; 6:30 pm	No. 9	at Boise State	W 83–77	24–2 (13–1)	Bronco Gymnasium (3,946); Boise, Idaho
Big Sky tournament
Fri, Mar 5; 7:10 pm	(1) No. 6	(4) Weber State; Semifinal	W 57–55	25–2	Kibbie Dome (8,150); Moscow, Idaho
Sat, Mar 6; 7:40 pm	(1) No. 6	(3) Nevada-Reno; Final	W 85–80	26–2	Kibbie Dome (8,250); Moscow, Idaho
NCAA tournament
Fri, Mar 12	(3W) No. 8	Bye; First round			
Sun, Mar 14; 1:30 pm, CBS	(3W) No. 8	vs. (6W) No. 16 Iowa; Second round	W 69–67 ^{OT}	27–2	Beasley Coliseum (12,340); Pullman, Washington
Thu, Mar 18; 6:10 pm, CBS	(3W) No. 8	vs. (2W) No. 4 Oregon State; Sweet Sixteen	L 42–60	27–3	Marriott Center (15,237); Provo, Utah
*Non-conference game. ^{#}Rankings from AP poll. (#) Tournament seedings in parentheses. All times are in Pacific time.
