= Brian Kellerman =

American basketball player (born c.1961)

Personal information
- Born: c. 1961 (age 64–65)
- Listed height: 6 ft 5 in (1.96 m)
- Listed weight: 190 lb (86 kg)

Career information
- High school: Richland (Richland, Washington)
- College: Idaho (1979–1983)
- NBA draft: 1983: 7th round, 140th overall pick
- Drafted by: Houston Rockets
- Playing career: 1983–1986
- Position: Shooting guard

Career history
- 1983–1984: Crystal Palace
- 1984–1985: Athletes in Action
- 1985–1986: Efes Pilsen

Career highlights
- Big Sky Player of the Year (1981); 3× First-team All-Big Sky (1981–1983)
- Stats at Basketball Reference

Brian Kellerman (born c. 1961) is an American former basketball player, known for his college career for the Idaho Vandals, where he was the Big Sky Conference player of the year in 1981 as a sophomore. He later played professionally in England and Turkey.

== High school career ==
Raised in Richland, Washington, Kellerman graduated from Richland High School in 1979; during his senior season, he led the Bombers to the Washington AAA state championship and was named state player of the year.

A 6 ft 2 in (1.88 m) small forward in high school, Kellerman was not recruited by major conference schools, but was signed by University of Idaho head coach Don Monson who projected him as a shooting guard. He grew three inches (7.5 cm) between committing to the Vandals and arriving on campus, making him a taller guard, especially in the mid-major Big Sky Conference.

== College career ==
Idaho had finished last in the Big Sky Conference in the previous five seasons. Kellerman became a starter as a true freshman, teaming with senior and eventual Big Sky MVP Don Newman to lead the Vandals to a second-place finish in the regular season (9–5) in 1980 and their first appearance in the four-team conference tournament. He averaged 11.3 points and 3.4 assists on the season as Idaho finished with an overall record of 17–10.

For the 1981 season, Kellerman was joined by junior college transfer Ken Owens and led Idaho to eleven consecutive wins to start the campaign. They were 23–3 in the regular season, winning the Big Sky season (12–2) and tournament titles. In the NCAA tournament, the Vandals' first appearance, they were seeded seventh in the West region, but narrowly lost to Pittsburgh by a point in overtime and finished at 25–4 overall. Kellerman received individual recognition after averaging 16 points and 3.2 assists a game and earning Big Sky Player of the Year honors as a sophomore.

In 1982, Kellerman and Owens led the Vandals to their best season in program history. Idaho won their first sixteen contests before dropping a pair of January road games to Montana and Notre Dame. These were the only losses for the rest of the regular season as Idaho again hosted and won the conference tournament to enter the NCAA tournament at 26–2 and ranked eighth in both major polls. Third-seeded in the West region, the Vandals won their second round contest over Iowa 69–67 in overtime and advanced to the Sweet 16, but fell to Oregon State to finish at 27–3 overall. Kellerman was again honored as a first-team All-Big Sky pick, but lost the conference player of the year award to his backcourt partner Owens, the third Vandal honored in as many years.

With the loss of Owens and starting forward Gordie Herbert to graduation, the 1983 team took a step back in the conference, tying for third place (9–5). Idaho became the first Big Sky team to appear in the National Invitation Tournament (NIT), but lost at Oregon State and finished at 20–9 overall, As a senior, Kellerman posted a career-high 17.9 points per game and was named All-Big Sky for the third consecutive season, ending his collegiate career as Idaho's all-time leading scorer (since eclipsed) with 1,586 points. In his four seasons as a starter, the Vandals' overall record was 89–26 (.774), with three national postseason appearances.

In 1988, Kellerman was named to the Big Sky Conference's 25th anniversary team, along with teammate Owens. In 2006, he was inducted into the Northern Idaho Athletic Hall of Fame and two years later was named to the University of Idaho Athletics Hall of Fame.

== Professional career and later life ==
Kellerman was selected by the Houston Rockets in the seventh round of the 1983 NBA draft (140th overall), but did not make the team. He went to England to play for the Crystal Palace basketball team for the 1983–84 season, then returned to the United States and played for Athletes in Action, a faith-based barnstorming team known for playing exhibition games against American colleges in the 1980s. For the 1985–1986 season, Kellerman joined Efes Pilsen in Turkey. Following his lone season in Turkey, Kellerman retired from playing and entered software sales.
