= 1979–80 Idaho Vandals men's basketball team =

American college basketball season

1979–80 Idaho Vandals men's basketball
- Conference: Big Sky Conference
- Record: 17–10 (9–5 Big Sky)
- Head coach: Don Monson (2nd season)
- Assistant coaches: Barry Collier; Rod Snook
- MVP: Don Newman
- Home arena: Kibbie Dome

1979–80 Big Sky men's basketball standings
| | Conf. | | | | Overall |
| Team | W | | L | PCT | W | | L | PCT |
|---|---|---|---|---|---|---|---|---|
| No. 17 Weber State † | 13 | – | 1 | .929 | 26 | – | 3 | .897 |
| Idaho | 9 | – | 5 | .643 | 17 | – | 10 | .630 |
| Montana | 8 | – | 6 | .571 | 17 | – | 11 | .607 |
| Montana State | 7 | – | 7 | .500 | 14 | – | 12 | .538 |
| Nevada | 5 | – | 9 | .357 | 10 | – | 19 | .345 |
| Idaho State | 5 | – | 9 | .357 | 9 | – | 17 | .346 |
| Northern Arizona | 5 | – | 9 | .357 | 14 | – | 12 | .538 |
| Boise State | 4 | – | 10 | .286 | 10 | – | 16 | .385 |
† Conference tournament winner Rankings from AP poll

The 1979–80 Idaho Vandals men's basketball team represented the University of Idaho during the 1979–80 NCAA Division I men's basketball season. The Vandals were led by second-year head coach Don Monson and played their home games on campus at the Kibbie Dome in Moscow, Idaho.

After five consecutive seasons in last place in the Big Sky Conference, the Vandals were expected by most to stay there, but climbed up to second in the final standings and qualified for the four-team conference tournament for the first time.

In non-conference games, the Vandals fell to Oregon State, Washington, and neighbor Washington State, but had wins over Gonzaga, Penn State, Oregon, and Nebraska. The Cornhuskers traveled to the Kibbie Dome in early January, led by former Vandal head coach Joe Cipriano, stricken with cancer. The attendance was 5,500, the second-largest attendance for basketball on campus at the time.

Idaho lost their first three conference games in early January, then won nine of eleven to end the regular season at 9–5 and 17–9 overall. An NIT invitation was likely if they won their first game of the Big Sky tourney at Ogden, Utah (and an NCAA tourney berth with two wins).

The Vandals met Montana in the semifinals, whom they had swept in the regular season, but lost the third meeting on the neutral court. Sensing that Montana was a less formidable opponent in the finals for host Weber State, the Ogden fans sided with Montana and the Grizzlies outscored the Vandals 16–2 in the final five minutes and won by ten points. The loss in the semifinals cost them an NIT bid; Idaho missed the postseason and finished at 17–10. It was their best season in seventeen years since Gus Johnson packed Northwest gyms and led the Vandals to a 20–6 record in 1963, Cipriano's final season as head coach.

The overtime loss to Boise State on January 12 was the last home defeat for the Vandals for over three years, until February 1983.

== Notes ==
Senior Don Newman was a unanimous selection to the all-conference team, and the player of the year. He played professional football in Canada for several seasons and later was a basketball coach in the college and NBA ranks. Forward Reed Jaussi went to medical school, served as a flight surgeon in the Air Force, and is an ophthalmologist in Las Vegas.

Monson and the freshmen (Brian Kellerman, Phil Hopson, and reserve Ben Ross) led Idaho to the best four-year stretch in program history. Kellerman was the player of the year (and state champion) in Washington as a high school senior in 1979, and was a four-year starter at Idaho. He was first-team all-conference for three years (honorable mention as a freshman), and was the Big Sky player of the year as a sophomore.

== Roster ==
1979–80 Idaho Vandals men's basketball team
Players
Coaches

| Pos. | # | Name | Height | Weight | Year | Previous school | Hometown |
|---|---|---|---|---|---|---|---|
| G | 3 | Don Newman | 6 ft 3 in (1.91 m) | 190 lb (86 kg) | RS Sr | LSU | New Orleans, LA |
| G | | Ted Strugar | 6 ft 3 in (1.91 m) | — | So | Archb. Grace HS | Minneapolis, MN |
| C | 11 | Jeff Brudie | 6 ft 11 in (2.11 m) | — | Jr | Bonneville HS | Idaho Falls, ID |
| G | 12 | Brian Kellerman | 6 ft 3 in (1.91 m) | 180 lb (82 kg) | Fr | Richland HS | Richland, WA |
| F | 14 | Reed Jaussi | 6 ft 4 in (1.93 m) | — | Sr | Idaho Falls HS | Idaho Falls, ID |
| F | 20 | Gordon Herbert | 6 ft 6 in (1.98 m) | 205 lb (93 kg) | Jr | N.Idaho, Penticton HS | Penticton, BC |
| G | 22 | Al Williams | — | — | Jr | North Idaho | Chicago, IL |
| F | 31 | Dan Forge | 6 ft 5 in (1.96 m) | — | Jr | Lewiston HS | Lewiston, ID |
| G | 32 | Ben Ross | 6 ft 4 in (1.93 m) | 180 lb (82 kg) | Fr | Coeur d'Alene HS | Coeur d'Alene, ID |
| C | 35 | Mike Dow | 6 ft 11 in (2.11 m) | — | Jr |
| F | 44 | Phil Hopson | 6 ft 6 in (1.98 m) | 190 lb (86 kg) | Fr | Jefferson HS | Portland, OR |
| C | 52 | Ron Maben | 6 ft 6 in (1.98 m) | — | Jr | Spokane CC, West Division HS | Milwaukee, WI |

Head coach

- Don Monson (Idaho)

Assistant coach(es)

- Barry Collier (Butler)
- Rod Snook (Whittier)

Legend

- (C) Team captain
- (S) Suspended
- (I) Ineligible
- (W) Walk-on
- Injured
- Current redshirt

Roster

== Schedule and results ==
| Date time, TV | Rank^{#} | Opponent^{#} | Result | Record | Site (attendance) city, state |
|---|---|---|---|---|---|
| Sat, Dec 1*; 8:00 pm | | Pepperdine | W 78–72 | 1–0 | Kibbie Dome; Moscow, Idaho |
| Mon, Dec 3* | | Washington | L 71–80 | 1–1 | Hec Edmundson Pavilion (2,034); Seattle, Washington |
| Fri, Dec 7* | | vs. Chicago State; Malibu Classic | L 65–68 | 1–2 | Firestone Fieldhouse; Malibu, California |
| Sat, Dec 8* | | at Pepperdine; Malibu Classic | W 77–62 | 2–2 | Firestone Fieldhouse; Malibu, California |
| Tue, Dec 11*; 8:00 pm | | Whitworth | W 116–56 | 3–2 | Kibbie Dome; Moscow, Idaho |
| Thu, Dec 13*; 8:00 pm | | Seattle Pacific | W 99–77 | 4–2 | Kibbie Dome; Moscow, Idaho |
| Fri, Dec 21*; 8:00 pm | | Gonzaga; Rivalry | W 50–49 | 5–2 | Kibbie Dome (2,512); Moscow, Idaho |
| Wed, Dec 26*; 7:00 pm | | vs. No. 18 Oregon State; Far West Classic | L 59–100 | 5–3 | Memorial Coliseum (11,025); Portland, Oregon |
| Fri, Dec 28*; 1:00 pm | | vs. Penn State; Far West Classic | W 50–46 | 6–3 | Memorial Coliseum (4,500); Portland, Oregon |
| Sat, Dec 29*; 3:00 pm | | vs. Oregon; Far West Classic | W 72–69 ^{OT} | 7–3 | Memorial Coliseum (6,518); Portland, Oregon |
| Wed, Jan 2*; 8:00 pm | | Nebraska | W 64–55 | 8–3 | Kibbie Dome (5,500); Moscow, Idaho |
| Fri, Jan 4; 7:00 pm | | at Idaho State | L 57–65 | 8–4 (0–1) | ISU Minidome (4,586); Pocatello, Idaho |
| Sat, Jan 5; 7:00 pm | | at Weber State | L 41–42 | 8–5 (0–2) | Dee Events Center (11,144); Ogden, Utah |
| Wed, Jan 9* | | vs. Washington State; Battle of the Palouse | L 57–63 | 8–6 | Spokane Coliseum (5,159); Spokane, Washington |
| Sat, Jan 12; 8:00 pm | | Boise State | L 68–71 ^{OT} | 8–7 (0–3) | Kibbie Dome (5,200); Moscow, Idaho |
| Thu, Jan 17; 8:00 pm | | Montana State | W 100–91 | 9–7 (1–3) | Kibbie Dome (3,300); Moscow, Idaho |
| Sat, Jan 19; 8:00 pm | | Montana | W 63–62 | 10–7 (2–3) | Kibbie Dome (5,700); Moscow, Idaho |
| Thu, Jan 24; 6:30 pm | | at Northern Arizona | W 72–61 | 11–7 (3–3) | Walkup Skydome; Flagstaff, Arizona |
| Sat, Jan 26; 8:00 pm | | at Nevada-Reno | L 62–72 | 11–8 (3–4) | Centennial Coliseum (3,929); Reno, Nevada |
| Thu, Jan 31; 8:00 pm | | No. 15 Weber State | W 51–45 | 12–8 (4–4) | Kibbie Dome (5,800); Moscow, Idaho |
| Sat, Feb 2; 8:00 pm | | Idaho State | W 80–50 | 13–8 (5–4) | Kibbie Dome (6,100); Moscow, Idaho |
| Sat, Feb 9 | | at Boise State | W 81–69 | 14–8 (6–4) | Bronco Gymnasium (3,800); Boise, Idaho |
| Thu, Feb 14 | | at Montana | W 51–41 | 15–8 (7–4) | Adams Fieldhouse; Missoula, Montana |
| Sat, Feb 16 | | at Montana State | L 74–89 | 15–9 (7–5) | Brick Breeden Fieldhouse (5,779); Bozeman, Montana |
| Thu, Feb 21; 8:00 pm | | Nevada-Reno | W 89–70 | 16–9 (8–5) | Kibbie Dome (4,800); Moscow, Idaho |
| Sat, Feb 23; 8:00 pm | | Northern Arizona | W 85–63 | 17–9 (9–5) | Kibbie Dome (6,200); Moscow, Idaho |
Big Sky tournament
| Fri, Feb 29; 8:00 pm | (2) | vs. (3) Montana; Semifinal | L 53–63 | 17–10 | Dee Events Center (8,089); Ogden, Utah |
*Non-conference game. ^{#}Rankings from AP poll. (#) Tournament seedings in parentheses. All times are in Pacific time.
