= 1980–81 Idaho Vandals men's basketball team =

American college basketball season

1980–81 Idaho Vandals men's basketball

Big Sky champions

NCAA tournament, First round
- Conference: Big Sky Conference
- Record: 25–4 (12–2 Big Sky)
- Head coach: Don Monson (3rd season)
- Assistant coaches: Barry Collier; Rod Snook
- Home arena: Kibbie Dome

1980–81 Big Sky men's basketball standings
	Conf.				Overall
Team	W		L	PCT	W		L	PCT
Idaho †	12	–	2	.857	25	–	4	.862
Montana	11	–	3	.786	19	–	9	.679
Montana State	11	–	3	.786	16	–	11	.593
Idaho State	6	–	8	.429	12	–	14	.462
Nevada	5	–	9	.357	11	–	15	.423
Weber State	5	–	9	.357	8	–	19	.296
Boise State	4	–	10	.286	7	–	19	.269
Northern Arizona	2	–	12	.143	8	–	17	.320
† Big Sky Conference tournament winner

The 1980–81 Idaho Vandals men's basketball team represented the University of Idaho during the 1980–81 NCAA Division I men's basketball season. The Vandals were led by third-year head coach Don Monson and played their home games on campus at the Kibbie Dome in Moscow, Idaho.

Idaho won its first eleven games (including road wins at Nebraska, Washington State, and Gonzaga), went 23–3 in the regular season, and won the Big Sky Conference regular season championship, their first conference title in 58 years.

The Vandals' 12–2 conference record earned them the host position for the conference tournament (top four teams of the eight), which they won. Seeded seventh in the West region of the 48-team NCAA tournament, they traveled to El Paso, Texas. In the first round, Idaho lost by one point in overtime to Pittsburgh; they ended at 25–4 (.862), with most of the key players returning.

== Polls ==
Idaho was ranked for the first time in school history in February, for three weeks in the UPI coaches poll. Curiously, they entered its top twenty after a road loss, rose to 16th, then exited after completing the regular season with a nine-point road win. The Vandals received votes, but did not appear, in the AP writers poll (top twenty) until January 1982; they were ranked sixth in both polls at end of that regular season, and eighth in both final polls.

== Attendance ==
Prior to this season, the school attendance record for basketball was 6,449, set five years earlier at the Kibbie Dome's inaugural hoop game in January 1976 against Palouse neighbor Washington State. That was surpassed in 1981 with 6,800 for the conference opener with Weber State on Thursday, January 8.

The final two home regular season games both saw new records, as title-contending Montana State and Montana visited: 7,100 on Thursday, February 19, which was shattered with 9,000 two days later for Idaho's nineteenth consecutive home court win. (Two years later, the record increased to 11,800.)

== All-conference ==
Sophomore guard Brian Kellerman was the Big Sky's player of the year and a first team all-conference selection. Vandals on the second team were sophomore forward Phil Hopson, senior center Ron Maben, and junior point guard Ken Owens, the MVP of the conference tournament.

== Notes ==
Center Jeff Brudie earned a degree in civil engineering, graduated from the UI law school, and is a district judge in Lewiston.

== Roster ==
1980–81 Idaho Vandals men's basketball team
Players
Coaches

Pos.	#	Name	Height	Weight	Year	Previous school	Hometown
G	4	Mike Maben	6 ft 3 in (1.91 m)	185 lb (84 kg)	Jr	Milwaukee Tech HS	Milwaukee, WI
C	11	Jeff Brudie	6 ft 11 in (2.11 m)	—	Sr	Bonneville HS	Idaho Falls, Idaho
G	12	Brian Kellerman	6 ft 5 in (1.96 m)	190 lb (86 kg)	So	Richland HS	Richland, WA
G	14	Ken Owens	6 ft 0 in (1.83 m)	180 lb (82 kg)	Jr	Treasure Valley (OR)	New York, NY
F	20	Gordon Herbert (injured) (redshirt)	6 ft 6 in (1.98 m)	205 lb (93 kg)	Sr	N.Idaho, Penticton HS	Penticton, BC
G	22	Al Williams	—	—		North Idaho	Chicago, IL
F	24	Pete Prigge	6 ft 7 in (2.01 m)	190 lb (86 kg)	Fr	Fort Vancouver HS	Vancouver, WA
F	30	Zane Frazier	6 ft 5 in (1.96 m)	205 lb (93 kg)	Fr	Fairfax HS	Los Angeles, CA
F	31	Dan Forge	6 ft 5 in (1.96 m)	—	Sr	Lewiston HS	Lewiston, ID
G	32	Ben Ross	6 ft 4 in (1.93 m)	180 lb (82 kg)	So	Coeur d'Alene HS	Coeur d'Alene, ID
C	35	Mike Dow	6 ft 11 in (2.11 m)	—	Sr
G	42	Freeman Watkins	6 ft 4 in (1.93 m)	187 lb (85 kg)	Fr	Eisenhower HS	Utica, MI
F	44	Phil Hopson	6 ft 6 in (1.98 m)	190 lb (86 kg)	So	Jefferson HS	Portland, OR
C	52	Ron Maben	6 ft 6 in (1.98 m)	—	Sr	Spokane CC, West Division HS	Milwaukee, WI

Head coach

- Don Monson (Idaho)

Assistant coach(es)

- Barry Collier (Butler)
- Rod Snook (Whittier)

Legend

- (C) Team captain
- (S) Suspended
- (I) Ineligible
- (W) Walk-on
- Injured
- Current redshirt

Roster

== Schedule and results ==
Date time, TV	Rank^{#}	Opponent^{#}	Result	Record	Site (attendance) city, state
Fri, Nov 14*; 8:00 pm		Athletes in Action (Canada) (Exhibition)	W 65–63	—	Memorial Gymnasium (2,500); Moscow, Idaho
Sat, Nov 29*; 6 pm		at Nebraska	W 64–53	1–0	Bob Devaney Center (7,750); Lincoln, Nebraska
Mon, Dec 1*; 7:30 pm		vs. Washington State; Battle of the Palouse	W 65–51	2–0	Spokane Coliseum (3,186); Spokane, Washington
Fri, Dec 5*; 8:00 pm		Simon Fraser (BC)	W 79–69	3–0	Kibbie Dome (3,200); Moscow, Idaho
Sat, Dec 6*; 7:30 pm		at Gonzaga; Rivalry	W 73–69	4–0	Kennedy Pavilion (4,242); Spokane, Washington
Mon, Dec 8*; 8:00 pm		U.S. International (CA)	W 78–56	5–0	Kibbie Dome (3,000); Moscow, Idaho
Thu, Dec 11*; 8:00 pm		San Jose State	W 69–55	6–0	Kibbie Dome (4,200); Moscow, Idaho
Sat, Dec 13*; 8:00 pm		St. Martin's (WA)	W 90–46	7–0	Kibbie Dome (4,200); Moscow, Idaho
Thu, Dec 18*; 8:00 pm		Wisconsin–Oshkosh	W 113–67	8–0	Kibbie Dome (3,700); Moscow, Idaho
Sat, Dec 20*; 8:00 pm		Northwest Nazarene (ID)	W 94–55	9–0	Kibbie Dome (2,750); Moscow, Idaho
Sat, Dec 27*; 7:00 pm		vs. Oklahoma City; All-College tournament	W 74–61	10–0	Myriad Center (2,857); Oklahoma City, Oklahoma
Mon, Dec 29*; 7:00 pm		vs. Long Island; All-College Tournament	W 90–68	11–0	Myriad Center (4,009); Oklahoma City, Oklahoma
Tue, Dec 30*; 7:00 pm		vs. Oklahoma State; All-College Tournament (final)	L 83–94	11–1	Myriad Center (8,012); Oklahoma City, Oklahoma
Thu, Jan 8; 8:00 pm		Weber State	W 57–46	12–1 (1–0)	Kibbie Dome (6,800); Moscow, Idaho
Sat, Jan 10; 8:00 pm		Idaho State	W 75–60	13–1 (2–0)	Kibbie Dome (5,200); Moscow, Idaho
Thu, Jan 15; 8:00 pm		at Nevada-Reno	W 63–59	14–1 (3–0)	Centennial Coliseum (3,997); Reno, Nevada
Sat, Jan 17; 6:30 pm		at Boise State	W 57–45	15–1 (4–0)	Bronco Gymnasium (3,682); Boise, Idaho
Fri, Jan 23; 7:00 pm		at Montana	W 47–44	16–1 (5–0)	Dahlberg Arena (9,323); Missoula, Montana
Sat, Jan 24; 7:00 pm		at Montana State	L 59–68	16–2 (5–1)	Brick Breeden Fieldhouse (6,467); Bozeman, Montana
Thu, Jan 29; 8:00 pm		Nevada-Reno	W 81–76	17–2 (6–1)	Kibbie Dome (6,000); Moscow, Idaho
Sat, Jan 31; 8:00 pm		Northern Arizona	W 72–61	18–2 (7–1)	Kibbie Dome (6,400); Moscow, Idaho
Fri, Feb 6; 7:00 pm		at Idaho State	W 59–58	19–2 (8–1)	ISU Minidome (7,500); Pocatello, Idaho
Sat, Feb 7; 6:30 pm		at Weber State	L 49–53	19–3 (8–2)	Dee Events Center (6,374); Ogden, Utah
Sat, Feb 14; 8:00 pm	No. 20	Boise State	W 70–64	20–3 (9–2)	Kibbie Dome (5,900); Moscow, Idaho
Thu, Feb 19; 8:00 pm	No. 16	Montana State	W 73–55	21–3 (10–2)	Kibbie Dome (7,100); Moscow, Idaho
Sat, Feb 21; 8:00 pm	No. 16	Montana	W 87–78	22–3 (11–2)	Kibbie Dome (9,000); Moscow, Idaho
Thu, Feb 26; 6:30 pm	No. 17	at Northern Arizona	W 74–65	23–3 (12–2)	Walkup Skydome (3,465); Flagstaff, Arizona
Big Sky tournament
Fri, Mar 6; 7:00 pm	(1)	(4) Idaho State; Semifinal	W 69–45	24–3	Kibbie Dome (8,250); Moscow, Idaho
Sat, Mar 7; 7:30 pm	(1)	(2) Montana; Final	W 70–54	25–3	Kibbie Dome (8,300); Moscow, Idaho
NCAA Tournament
Fri, Mar 13*; 6:00 pm	(7W)	vs. (10W) Pittsburgh; First round	L 69–70 ^{OT}	25–4	Special Events Center (7,109); El Paso, Texas
*Non-conference game. ^{#}Rankings from UPI coaches poll. (#) Tournament seedings in parentheses. All times are in Pacific Time.
