= 1982–83 Weber State Wildcats men's basketball team =

American college basketball season

1982–83 Weber State Wildcats men's basketball

Big Sky champions

NCAA tournament
- Conference: Big Sky Conference
- Record: 23–8 (10–4 Big Sky)
- Head coach: Neil McCarthy (8th season)
- Home arena: Dee Events Center

1982–83 Big Sky men's basketball standings
	Conf.				Overall
Team	W		L	PCT	W		L	PCT
Nevada	10	–	4	.714	18	–	11	.621
Weber State †	10	–	4	.714	23	–	8	.742
Montana	9	–	5	.643	21	–	8	.724
Idaho	9	–	5	.643	20	–	9	.690
Idaho State	7	–	7	.500	10	–	17	.370
Boise State	5	–	9	.357	10	–	17	.370
Montana State	3	–	11	.214	10	–	17	.370
Northern Arizona	3	–	11	.214	10	–	16	.385
† Conference tournament winner

The 1982–83 Weber State Wildcats men's basketball team represented Weber State College during the 1982–83 NCAA Division I men's basketball season. Members of the Big Sky Conference, the Wildcats were led by eighth-year head coach Neil McCarthy and played their home games on campus at Dee Events Center in Ogden, Utah.

The Wildcats were 21–7 overall in the regular season and 10–4 in conference play; co-champions with Nevada, who won the tiebreaker and gained the right to host the conference tournament.

In the opening semifinal in Reno, Montana gave Weber State all they could handle, but fell short by a point. In the final against host Nevada, the Wildcats won by nine points and advanced to the 52-team NCAA tournament.

Seeded ninth in the West region, Weber State met Washington State in the first round in Boise, and lost by ten points.

No Wildcats were selected for the all-conference team; senior forward Royal Edwards was on the second team, and honorable mention went to guard John Price, forward Randy Worster, guard Greg Jones, and center Tom Heywood.

== Postseason result ==
Date time, TV	Rank^{#}	Opponent^{#}	Result	Record	Site (attendance) city, state
Big Sky tournament
Fri, March 11; 10:30 pm	(2)	vs. (3) Montana; Semifinal	W 54–53	22–7	Centennial Coliseum (3,000); Reno, Nevada
Sat, March 12; 8:30 pm	(2)	at (1) Nevada; Final	W 87–78	23–7	Centennial Coliseum (5,425); Reno, Nevada
NCAA tournament
Thu, March 17*; 7:10 pm, CBS	(9W)	vs. (8W) Washington State; First round	L 52–62	23–8	BSU Pavilion (11,200); Boise, Idaho
*Non-conference game. ^{#}Rankings from AP poll. (#) Tournament seedings in parentheses. All times are in Mountain time.
