= 1982–83 Idaho Vandals men's basketball team =

American college basketball season

1982–83 Idaho Vandals men's basketball

Far West Classic Champions

NIT, First round
- Conference: Big Sky Conference
- Record: 20–9 (9–5 Big Sky)
- Head coach: Don Monson (5th season)
- Assistant coaches: Barry Collier; Rod Snook
- Home arena: Kibbie Dome

1982–83 Big Sky men's basketball standings
	Conf.				Overall
Team	W		L	PCT	W		L	PCT
Nevada	10	–	4	.714	18	–	11	.621
Weber State †	10	–	4	.714	23	–	8	.742
Montana	9	–	5	.643	21	–	8	.724
Idaho	9	–	5	.643	20	–	9	.690
Idaho State	7	–	7	.500	10	–	17	.370
Boise State	5	–	9	.357	10	–	17	.370
Montana State	3	–	11	.214	10	–	17	.370
Northern Arizona	3	–	11	.214	10	–	16	.385
† Conference tournament winner

The 1982–83 Idaho Vandals men's basketball team represented the University of Idaho during the 1982–83 NCAA Division I men's basketball season. The two-time defending champions of the Big Sky Conference, Vandals were led by fifth-year head coach Don Monson and played their home games on campus at the Kibbie Dome in Moscow, Idaho.

With expanded student seating, the Vandals set basketball attendance records at the Kibbie Dome with 11,000 against Washington State on December 4, and eight hundred more on February 12 against Montana for a conference record. The former was an overtime victory, the third straight over the Cougars in the Battle of the Palouse, on the same night that the resurgent Vandal football team narrowly lost a I-AA playoff game on the road, televised on cable by WTBS of Atlanta. The latter with Montana was a deflating nineteen-point defeat to snap the 43-game home winning streak, begun over three years earlier in 1980. Idaho won its final three home games, but attendance fell; the highest was 8,000 for the finale against Boise State, Monson's hundredth and final win at the helm. Consecutive road losses the week prior at Idaho State and Weber State had eliminated any chance of another regular season title and the opportunity to host the conference tourney.

The Vandals successfully defended their title in the Far West Classic at Portland in late December, and had a 12–1 record in mid-January, and appeared capable of a third consecutive conference title. Four road defeats in conference and the home loss to Montana resulted in a tie for third place in the regular season with the Grizzlies, who swept their two-game series. With an opportunity to three-peat, the Vandals were the low seed in the four-team Big Sky tourney in Reno. They lost by five points to host Nevada-Reno in the semifinals, and neither was selected for the 52-team NCAA tournament; Weber State won the final and advanced.

Idaho became the first Big Sky team to earn an invitation to the NIT, but lost in the first round at Oregon State; they led by three at the half at Gill Coliseum, but lost by eighteen. the Beavers had also ended UI's season the previous year, in the Sweet Sixteen of the NCAA tournament. In both seasons, Idaho defeated OSU in the Far West Classic in late December, but lost the rematch in March.

Between semesters on December 20, the Vandals played a home game at Columbia High School in Richland, Washington, where senior guard Brian Kellerman had starred, and 4,100 packed the Art Dawald Gym for the homecoming. The popular Monson had coached at nearby Pasco High School for nine years (1967–76), and senior center Kelvin Smith was a PHS graduate. Idaho made a lengthy trip to South Carolina in January for a nationally televised game on CBS.

== Aftermath ==
Several days after the NIT loss in Corvallis, Monson expectedly left his alma mater for the University of Oregon in Eugene; he led the Ducks for nine seasons in the Pac-10, with three NIT appearances. Assistant coach Barry Collier applied for the Idaho vacancy, but athletic Bill Belknap hired Bill Trumbo, a junior college head coach from northern California; the Vandals returned to the cellar of the conference in each of the next three seasons and attendance plummeted. In March 1986, Trumbo was succeeded by Tim Floyd, an assistant under hall of fame head coach Don Haskins at Texas-El Paso.

With Monson for all five seasons at Idaho, Collier joined him at Oregon for three more, then was at Stanford for three seasons under Mike Montgomery. He became a head coach at his alma mater Butler in 1989, led the Bulldogs for eleven years, then went to Nebraska for six seasons.

This ended the best four-year stretch in the history of the program; the freshmen that entered in the fall of 1979 (Brian Kellerman, Phil Hopson, and reserve Ben Ross) and Monson led the Vandals to an overall record of 89–26 (.774) and three national postseason appearances. (In each of the previous five seasons of the late 1970s, Idaho had finished last in the Big Sky.) A four-year starter, Kellerman was first-team all-conference for three years (honorable mention as a freshman), and was the Big Sky player of the year as a sophomore, the second of three consecutive years in which that honor went to a Vandal guard. (From the Tri-Cities, Kellerman was the player of the year in Washington as high school senior in 1979, but was passed on by the Pac-10 schools.)

For the four seasons, Idaho had a home record of 51–2 (.962) with a 43-game winning streak. With only two home games, they went 10–5 overall against the four Northwest schools of the Pac-10, the strongest at the time was Oregon State; the Beavers won three of the five. Oregon dropped all three, the Cougars lost the last three, and Washington the last two. The Vandals also swept all four games from Gonzaga, (with hall of fame point guard John Stockton for the last three), and won consecutive Far West Classics in Portland.

== All-conference ==
In addition to Kellerman, senior center Kelvin Smith was also named to the All-Big Sky team; he was honorable mention the previous season. Senior forward Phil Hopson was on the second team for a third consecutive year, and junior point guard Stan Arnold was honored as the conference's newcomer of the year.

== Roster ==
1982–83 Idaho Vandals men's basketball team
Players
Coaches

Pos.	#	Name	Height	Weight	Year	Previous school	Hometown
G	10	Stan Arnold	6 ft 0 in (1.83 m)	185 lb (84 kg)	Jr	San Jose City College	San Jose, CA
G	12	Brian Kellerman	6 ft 5 in (1.96 m)	190 lb (86 kg)	Sr	Richland HS	Richland, WA
G	14	Joe Sweeney	5 ft 11 in (1.8 m)	—	Jr	Skyline College	San Bruno, CA
F	24	Pete Prigge	6 ft 7 in (2.01 m)	190 lb (86 kg)	Jr	Fort Vancouver HS	Vancouver, WA
F	30	Zane Frazier	6 ft 5 in (1.96 m)	205 lb (93 kg)	RS So	Fairfax HS	Los Angeles, CA
F	31	Antwine Murchison (redshirt)	6 ft 7 in (2.01 m)	190 lb (86 kg)	So	St. Mary's HS	Stockton, CA
G	32	Ben Ross	6 ft 4 in (1.93 m)	180 lb (82 kg)	Sr	Coeur d'Alene HS	Coeur d'Alene, ID
F	33	E.C. Morgan	6 ft 8 in (2.03 m)	—	Fr	Jesuit HS	Portland, OR
G	34	Matt Haskins (redshirt)	6 ft 3 in (1.91 m)	170 lb (77 kg)	So	Columbia HS	Richland, WA
C	40	Kelvin Smith	6 ft 6 in (1.98 m)	195 lb (88 kg)	Sr	Taft (CA), Pasco HS	Pasco, WA
G	42	Freeman Watkins	6 ft 4 in (1.93 m)	187 lb (85 kg)	Jr	Eisenhower HS	Utica, MI
F	44	Phil Hopson	6 ft 6 in (1.98 m)	190 lb (86 kg)	Sr	Jefferson HS	Portland, OR
F	52	Pete Reitz	6 ft 11 in (2.11 m)	210 lb (95 kg)	Fr	Placer HS	Auburn, CA

Head coach

- Don Monson (Idaho)

Assistant coach(es)

- Barry Collier (Butler)
- Rod Snook (Whittier)

Legend

- (C) Team captain
- (S) Suspended
- (I) Ineligible
- (W) Walk-on
- Injured
- Current redshirt

Roster

== Schedule and results ==
Date time, TV	Rank^{#}	Opponent^{#}	Result	Record	Site (attendance) city, state
Fri, Nov 12*; 8:00 pm		Athletes in Action (Canada) (Exhibition)	W 78–73	—	Kibbie Dome (5,000); Moscow, Idaho
Fri, Nov 26*; 7:00 pm		vs. Loyola Marymount; Sun Met Classic	W 67–60	1–0	Selland Arena (6,530); Fresno, California
Sat, Nov 27*; 9:00 pm		at Fresno State; Sun Met Classic (final)	L 34–38	1–1	Selland Arena (6,530); Fresno, California
Wed, Dec 1*; 8:00 pm		Washington	W 51–46	2–1	Kibbie Dome (6,100); Moscow, Idaho
Sat, Dec 4*; 8:00 pm		Washington State; Battle of the Palouse	W 62–58 ^{OT}	3–1	Kibbie Dome (11,000); Moscow, Idaho
Tue, Dec 7*; 8:00 pm		Eastern Washington	W 67–56	4–1	Kibbie Dome (5,000); Moscow, Idaho
Thu, Dec 9*; 8:00 pm		St. Martin's	W 65–44	5–1	Kibbie Dome (4,800); Moscow, Idaho
Sat, Dec 18*; 8:00 pm		UC Irvine	W 84–73	6–1	Kibbie Dome (6,500); Moscow, Idaho
Mon, Dec 20*; 8:00 pm		vs. Midwestern State (TX)	W 87–59	7–1	Art Dawald Gym (4,100); Richland, Washington
Sun, Dec 26*; 9:00 pm		vs. Portland; Far West Classic	W 63–57	8–1	Memorial Coliseum (5,511); Portland, Oregon
Tue, Dec 28*; 7:00 pm		vs. Oregon; Far West Classic (semifinal)	W 56–53	9–1	Memorial Coliseum (9,506); Portland, Oregon
Wed, Dec 29*; 9:00 pm		vs. Oregon State; Far West Classic (final)	W 42–41 ^{2OT}	10–1	Memorial Coliseum (12,117); Portland, Oregon
Sat, Jan 8*; 7:30 pm		at Gonzaga; Rivalry	W 65–57	11–0	Kennedy Pavilion (4,477); Spokane, Washington
Thu, Jan 13; 6:30 pm		at Northern Arizona	W 58–55	12–1 (1–0)	Walkup Skydome (4,135); Flagstaff, Arizona
Sat, Jan 15; 7:30 pm		at Nevada-Reno	L 69–73 ^{OT}	12–2 (1–1)	Centennial Coliseum (5,048); Reno, Nevada
Thu, Jan 20; 8:00 pm		Weber State	W 59–49	13–2 (2–1)	Kibbie Dome (7,700); Moscow, Idaho
Sat, Jan 22*; 2:00 pm, CBS		at South Carolina	L 54–56	13–3	Carolina Coliseum (9,673); Columbia, South Carolina
Thu, Jan 27; 6:30 pm		at Montana	L 49–59	13–4 (2–2)	Dahlberg Arena (9,310); Missoula, Montana
Sat, Jan 29; 7:00 pm		at Montana State	W 66–38	14–4 (3–2)	Brick Breeden Fieldhouse (3,304); Bozeman, Montana
Tue, Feb 1; 8:00 pm		Idaho State	W 87–70	15–4 (4–2)	Kibbie Dome (8,500); Moscow, Idaho
Sat, Feb 5; 6:30 pm		at Boise State	W 67–56	16–4 (5–2)	BSU Pavilion (10,145); Boise, Idaho
Thu, Feb 10; 8:00 pm		Montana State	W 73–69	17–4 (6–2)	Kibbie Dome (6,000); Moscow, Idaho
Sat, Feb 12; 8:00 pm		Montana	L 61–80	17–5 (6–3)	Kibbie Dome (11,800); Moscow, Idaho
Thu, Feb 17; 8:00 pm		Nevada-Reno	W 88–78	18–5 (7–3)	Kibbie Dome (6,500); Moscow, Idaho
Sat, Feb 19; 8:00 pm		Northern Arizona	W 75–48	19–5 (8–3)	Kibbie Dome (6,500); Moscow, Idaho
Thu, Feb 24; 6:30 pm		at Idaho State	L 69–77	19–6 (8–4)	ISU Minidome (5,273); Pocatello, Idaho
Sat, Feb 26; 6:30 pm		at Weber State	L 47–53 ^{OT}	19–7 (8–5)	Dee Events Center (11,454); Ogden, Utah
Sat, Mar 5; 8:00 pm		Boise State	W 86–70	20–7 (9–5)	Kibbie Dome (8,000); Moscow, Idaho
Big Sky tournament
Fri, Mar 11; 7:00 pm	(4)	at (1) Nevada-Reno; Semifinal	L 73–78	20–8	Centennial Coliseum (5,100); Reno, Nevada
National Invitation Tournament
Wed, Mar 16*; 7:30 pm		at Oregon State; First round	L 59–77	20–9	Gill Coliseum (7,800); Corvallis, Oregon
*Non-conference game. ^{#}Rankings from AP poll. (#) Tournament seedings in parentheses. All times are in Pacific Time.
