= Ken Owens (basketball) =

American basketball player & coach (born 1959)

Personal information
- Born: May 3, 1959 (age 67) New York City, New York, U.S.
- Listed height: 6 ft 0 in (1.83 m)
- Listed weight: 180 lb (82 kg)

Career information
- High school: Manhattan Vocational and Technical (New York City, New York)
- College: Treasure Valley CC (1978–1980); Idaho (1980–1982)
- NBA draft: 1982: 4th round, 88th overall pick
- Drafted by: Seattle SuperSonics
- Position: Point guard
- Number: 14
- Coaching career: 1987–present

Career history

Coaching
- 1987–2020: Columbia Basin (assistant)

Career highlights
- Big Sky Player of the Year (1982); First-team All-Big Sky (1982); Second-team All-Big Sky (1981); AP Honorable mention All-American (1982); 2× Big Sky tournament MVP (1981, 1982)
- Stats at Basketball Reference

Ken Owens (born May 3, 1959) is an American basketball coach and former player. He is known for his college basketball career at the University of Idaho, and was the Big Sky Conference Player of the Year in 1982.

== Early life and education ==
Born and raised in New York City, Owens attended Manhattan Vocational and Technical High School, then went west to Treasure Valley Community College (TVCC) in eastern Oregon, where he was recruited by former Idaho assistant Dale James.

== University of Idaho ==
This connection paid off for Vandals' head coach Don Monson as he recruited the point guard to complete his college career on the Palouse at Idaho.

Owens moved into the Idaho starting lineup immediately, succeeding conference player of the year Don Newman. He helped lead the Vandals to their first regular season title, averaging 13.5 points and 3.8 assists per game and earning second-team all-conference honors. At the close of the 1980–81 season, Owens led the team to a Big Sky tournament championship and the program's first NCAA tournament berth. He scored 18 points in the championship game against Montana and was named tournament MVP. Seventh-seeded in the West region, the Vandals lost in overtime by a point and ended the season at 25–4.

The following season, Idaho returned the bulk of its perimeter attack with Owens, 1981 Big Sky Player of the Year Brian Kellerman, and senior forward Gordon Herbert, who returned after a medical redshirt year. The Vandals opened with sixteen victories, including wins over four Pacific-10 Conference opponents. An early highlight of the season was winning the Far West Classic in Portland in late December, defeating Iowa State, Oregon State, and Oregon. Owens led the way, scoring 32 points in the championship game and taking tournament MVP honors. The fast start helped the Vandals to rise to eighth in the AP poll before falling at Montana on a last-second shot in January. This was their sole conference loss, and only one of two in a 24–2 regular season; they won their last eight games and climbed to sixth in both major polls. Owens capped the regular season by winning Big Sky Player of the Year honors, averaging 14.5 points and 4.0 assists.

Idaho again hosted and won the conference tournament, and Owens repeated as tourney MVP. Ranked eighth in both polls, they entered the 48-team NCAA tournament as the West region's third seed, with a first-round bye. After an overtime win in the second round over Iowa at neighboring Pullman, the Vandals advanced to the Sweet 16, but fell in a rematch to fourth-ranked Oregon State, the West's second seed, and ended at 27–3, which remains the program's best season.

Owens has received several accolades for his two seasons at Idaho, the best ever (52–7 (.881)) for Vandal basketball. In 1988, he was named to the Big Sky Conference's all-time team, named for the league's 25th anniversary. In 2012, he was inducted into the University of Idaho's athletics Hall of Fame.

== Later playing career and coaching ==
Following the close of his college career, Owens was selected in the fourth round (88th overall) of the 1982 NBA draft by the Seattle SuperSonics, but did not make the team. After a failed tryout with the Edmonton Eskimos of the Canadian Football League, he signed with Athletes in Action Canada, and played exhibitions against a number of U.S. and Canadian colleges. In 1987, he turned to coaching, accepting an assistant coach position at Columbia Basin College in Pasco, where he remained for over thirty years.
