= Don Monson =

American college basketball coach (1933–2025)

Biographical details
- Born: April 11, 1933; Menahga, Minnesota, U.S.
- Died: October 1, 2025 (aged 92)

Playing career
- 1951–1955: Idaho
- Positions: Guard, forward

Coaching career (HC unless noted)
- 1958–1967: Cheney HS (WA)
- 1967–1976: Pasco HS (WA)
- 1976–1978: Michigan State (assistant)
- 1978–1983: Idaho
- 1983–1992: Oregon
- 1993: Adelaide 36ers

Head coaching record
- Overall: 216–186 (.537) (college); 14–14 (.500) (NBL); 266–134 (.665) (high school)
- Tournaments: 1–2 (NCAA Division I); 1–4 (NIT)

Accomplishments and honors

Championships
- 2 Big Sky regular season (1981, 1982); 2 Big Sky tournament (1981, 1982)

Awards
- NABC Coach of the Year (1982); 2× Big Sky Coach of the Year (1981, 1982)

Don Monson
- Military career
- Allegiance: United States
- Branch: United States Navy
- Service years: 1955–1957
- Units: 11th Naval District, San Diego
- Conflicts: Cold War

Donald Lloyd Monson (April 11, 1933 – October 1, 2025) was an American college basketball head coach and the father of head coach Dan Monson. He was a high school head coach for 18 seasons and college head coach for 14 seasons: five at Idaho and nine at Oregon. He was selected by his peers as the national coach of the year in 1982. Monson spent 1993 in Australia, coaching the Adelaide 36ers of the National Basketball League.

== Early life ==
Born in Menahga, Minnesota, on April 11, 1933, Monson moved with his family when he was in the second grade to Coeur d'Alene in northern Idaho. During his sophomore year at Coeur d'Alene High School, the Vikings won the state title under longtime coach Elmer Jordan, defeating Burley 53–43 in far-away Pocatello.

Monson graduated from high school in 1951 and then attended the University of Idaho in Moscow, where he lettered for three years in basketball and graduated in 1955. (team photo) He played under Vandal head coach Charles Finley through his junior year, then Harlan Hodges for his senior season.

== High school coach ==
After a stint in the U.S. Navy, Monson was a successful high school coach in Eastern Washington, a head coach for 18 seasons from 1958–76, compiling a record of 266–134 (.665). Monson first led Cheney High School for nine seasons with a 105–69 (.603) record. While in Cheney, southwest of nearby Spokane, he earned a master's degree at Eastern Washington State College. In 1967, Monson moved southwest to Pasco in the Tri-Cites, where he led Pasco High for nine seasons and posted a 161–65 (.712) record.

== College assistant ==
Monson moved up to the collegiate ranks in 1976 as an assistant under friend Jud Heathcote at Michigan State. Heathcote (1927–2017) was in his first year with the Spartans, hired after five seasons as head coach at Montana; he was previously an assistant at Washington State in Pullman and a high school head coach in the Spokane area at West Valley. The two had first crossed paths in December 1950, when Monson was a high school senior; he scored a dozen points and CDA defeated West Valley 35–25 in Heathcote's first game as a head coach.

With the Spartans, Monson refined the 2–3 matchup zone defense and was given credit for the recruitment of Earvin "Magic" Johnson to the Spartans in 1977. Monson stayed in East Lansing for two seasons, leaving in August 1978 for the late vacancy at Idaho. The Spartans won the national championship that season, defeating the Indiana State Sycamores, led by Larry Bird, in the title game in Salt Lake City in 1979.

== Idaho Vandals ==
Monson became a college head coach in August 1978 at the University of Idaho, his alma mater. In the early 1950s, he was a reserve guard for the Vandals who "never started one damn game here." Monson took over a dismal Idaho basketball program from Jim Jarvis, who resigned on July 1 after four poor seasons (26–78, .250) and was under investigation by the NCAA for recruiting violations. Jarvis' final team went just 4–22 (.154) and 1–13 in conference play in 1978. The Vandals finished in last place in the eight-team Big Sky every season under Jarvis and had finished no higher than sixth place for seven consecutive seasons.

The first season under Monson brought another last place finish (4–10) in the Big Sky, their fifth straight, and an overall record of 11–15 for the 1979 season, but the groundwork had begun. The next season, the 1980 Vandals finished second in the Big Sky (9–5) and 17–10 (.630) overall. They swept Montana in the regular season, but lost to the Grizzlies in the semi-finals of the four-team conference tournament, won by host and regular season champion Weber State.

=== 1980–81 season ===
Monson's third season opened well, as the 1981 Vandals won their first ten games (including road wins at Nebraska, Washington State, and Gonzaga). Idaho went 23–3 in the regular season and won the Big Sky regular season championship, their first conference title ever in basketball.

Their 12–2 conference record earned them the host position for the conference tournament (top four teams of the eight), which they won and were seeded seventh in the West region of the 48-team NCAA tournament. Idaho lost in overtime by one point to Pittsburgh, the #10 seed, in El Paso in the first round. The Vandals finished the season with an overall record of 25–4 (.862), with most of the key players returning.

=== 1981–82 season ===
The 1982 basketball team was the most successful in the school's history, and has yet to be surpassed. Building upon the success of the previous season, the Vandals won their first 16 games and were ranked sixth in both polls after completing a 24–2 regular season. They defeated Gonzaga (for a third straight year) and all four Pac-10 teams from the Northwest. Idaho won the eight-team Far West Classic in Portland in late December 1981, winning all three games by at least 19 points (over Iowa State, Oregon State, and Oregon).

The Vandals' only setbacks during the regular season were consecutive two-point road losses in late January. The first was to rival Montana on a raucous Saturday night in Missoula on a tip-in at the buzzer. The second was to Notre Dame in South Bend two days later, ending a three-games-in-four-nights road trip, which included multiple weather-related travel delays and re-routes, and a 4:30 am arrival in South Bend on game day. Although the Vandals hit 14 of their first 15 shots to jump to 28–10 lead over the Irish, Notre Dame regrouped at home to win by two in overtime. Idaho was awarded just four free throws in the 45 minutes of play and missed them all. Notre Dame was led by future NBA guard John Paxson in 1982. The Vandals then won eight straight games to conclude the regular season, and won the four-team conference tournament, which they hosted for the second straight year as regular season champions.

Their 26–2 record after the Big Sky tournament (& ten straight victories) earned the Vandals a #8 national ranking and a #3 seed in the West region of the 48-team NCAA tournament, which included a first round bye.

Idaho's first game (in the second round) was nearly a home game, played less than eight miles (13 km) west at Beasley Coliseum in Pullman on a Sunday afternoon. The opponent was 16th-ranked Iowa of the Big Ten, the region's #6 seed, then coached by Lute Olson. Iowa, a Final Four team two years earlier, won their first-round game handily, but Idaho won this close game by two points, 69–67 in overtime, and advanced to the Sweet 16 at the West regional in Provo, Utah. There the Vandals met fourth-ranked Oregon State, the #2 seed in the West region. Idaho had defeated the Beavers by 22 points in December at the Far West Classic in Portland, but this time the result was far different, as the Beavers won 60–42. OSU was defeated two days later by the region's #1 seed Georgetown, led by freshman center Patrick Ewing. (Georgetown advanced to the national final, where they lost by a point to North Carolina.)

The Vandals finished the 1982 season at 27–3 (.900), and were ranked as high as sixth in the nation (AP and UPI polls); they were eighth in mid-January, when they were undefeated at 15–0. The 1982 starters Ken Owens (6 ft 0 in (1.83 m)) and Brian Kellerman (6 ft 5 in (1.96 m)) in the backcourt, with forwards Phil Hopson and Gordie Herbert and center Kelvin Smith, all at 6 ft 6 in (1.98 m). Just before their two losses in January, the team was featured in a two-page article in Sports Illustrated. (team photo) The alley-oop was a frequently used play against man-to-man defenses.

Don Monson was named the Kodak Coach of the Year in Division I in 1982 (photo) and rumors were rampant that he would jump to a higher league, maybe to struggling Arizona in the Pac-10. That position was filled by Ben Lindsey (who was dismissed after one season, succeeded by Lute Olson of Iowa), and Monson chose to stay for another year at Idaho. With a salary of about $40,000 in 1982 and a one-year contract, an "appreciation fund" was set up by local fans to entice him to stay in Moscow. The 1982 team was inducted into the Vandal Athletics Hall of Fame, as was Monson.

=== 1982–83 season ===
The 1983 Vandals returned three starters (Kellerman, Hopson, and Smith) and began the season at 12–1, repeating as Far West Classic champs in December 1982. Idaho again defeated all four Northwest Pac-10 schools during the regular season, and also won at Gonzaga, then led by legendary point guard John Stockton.

Several of the Vandals players had injuries late in the year, and the team finished tied for third in the Big Sky at 9–5, and an overall record of 20–7. They lost in the semifinals (first round) of the conference tourney at Reno to regular season champion Nevada, 78–73. This was followed by a first round loss in the NIT against Oregon State in Corvallis on March 16, ending the Vandals' season at 20–9 (.690), and Monson's five-year stint on the Palouse.

=== Legacy in Moscow ===
Don Monson became a cult hero in the Moscow community in the early 1980s, bringing championship status to a university that had long struggled in both football and basketball. He was well known for his anguished expressions and contorted body language while on the Idaho sideline, which became the subject for an unofficial fan club (and caricature T-shirts). Monson was the biggest thing to happen to Vandal basketball since Gus Johnson in 1963 (and his elevated nail at the Corner Club on Main Street). Five years after his departure to Eugene, he was honored with a roast in Moscow.

The Vandal basketball team could outdraw the Division I-AA football team in the multi-purpose Kibbie Dome, and it was ranked by Sports Illustrated as one of the toughest home courts in America. From January 1980 to February 1983, the Vandals won 43 consecutive games on their home floor. (After a shocking loss to Montana in front of a record 11,800 on February 12, the Vandals won their final three home games in 1983.) In Monson's final four seasons at Idaho, the Vandals were 51–2 (.962) at home.

Monson's overall record in his five seasons at Idaho was 100–41 (.709), and was 72–16 (.818) in his final three seasons. His successor was Bill Trumbo, a successful junior college head coach in northern California. Trumbo did not come close to equaling Monson's success, as the Vandals struggled and returned to last place in the Big Sky in each of his three seasons, going 8–34 (.190) in conference and 28–59 (.322) overall. Trumbo lost 21 games at home in the Kibbie Dome and was relieved in March 1986, succeeded by Tim Floyd.

During the "Monson Era" at Idaho, the neighboring Washington State Cougars were also doing well in basketball under head coach George Raveling, advancing to the NCAA tournament in 1980 and 1983. Monson's Vandals were 3–2 against the Cougars, winning the final three (in three different cities) to the great frustration of the Cougar Nation and the Pullman community.

The highlight of this series was the final game, in early December 1982, which was the only one played in Moscow. A then-record (basketball) crowd of over 11,000 packed into the Kibbie Dome's south grandstand & expanded temporary bleachers to witness a four-point overtime victory for the Vandals, their 37th consecutive win at home. Concurrently in Kentucky, the resurgent Vandals football team (under first-year head coach Dennis Erickson) was on the road battling eventual champion Eastern Kentucky in the I-AA playoffs; losing 38–30 in a game that went down to the final play.

That 1983 Cougar team, led by future NBA guard Craig Ehlo, finished second in the Pac-10 with a 14–4 record, a game behind champion UCLA. The Cougars' non-conference losses were both on the road in early December to Big Sky opponents; Idaho and Montana. The Cougars advanced to the second round in the West regional of the NCAA tournament, losing to #1 seed Virginia by five points, finishing at 23–7. After that loss, head coach George Raveling left Washington State to replace Lute Olson at Iowa. With Monson also leaving for Oregon, college basketball on the Palouse went into dormancy. Simultaneous success for both universities in basketball (or any other sport) has yet to recur.

== Oregon Ducks ==
Following the 1983 season, Monson moved up to the Pac-10 conference to coach the University of Oregon Ducks in Eugene. He took over a 9–18 team from former head coach Jim Haney. Monson's best record at Oregon came in his first season, as the 1984 Ducks went 11–7 in the Pac-10 and 16–13 (.552) overall. Monson went 116–145 (.444) in nine seasons, but never made the NCAA tournament. Oregon qualified for the NIT three times, but only won one game, in 1988.

Monson's final year at Oregon was the 1992 season, which ended with a 2–16 record in conference and 6–21 (.222) overall. He was replaced by Jerry Green, who coached the Ducks for five seasons before leaving for Tennessee after the 1997 season. Green was succeeded by Ernie Kent.

Monson's Oregon Ducks never faced the Idaho Vandals during his nine seasons in Eugene. The two teams played the season before Monson arrived (his last at Idaho, in the Far West Classic, a Vandal victory) and the one immediately after he departed in December 1992.

Monson's teams went 216–186 (.537) in his 14 seasons as a head coach. His best finish was with his 1982 Idaho Vandals, a #3 seed in the West regional that advanced to the Sweet Sixteen, and spent time in the national polls in the Top Ten. They finished 27–3 without a starter taller than 6 ft 6 in (1.98 m).

In December 2004, Gonzaga honored Monson with the second annual "Battle in Seattle Award", presented to an individual who has demonstrated a lifelong contribution to basketball in the Pacific Northwest. Marv Harshman was the inaugural recipient a year earlier.

== Adelaide 36ers ==
In 1993, Monson was signed to coach the Adelaide 36ers who play in the National Basketball League in Australia. Monson only coached the 36ers for the 1993 NBL season, leading the team to a 14–14 record as the 36ers finished in 7th place, losing their quarter-final series in two games to the defending champion South East Melbourne Magic.

Although the 36ers had improved on their 1992 season record of 11-13 where they failed to reach the playoffs for only the second time since 1984, Monson was not retained as coach of the team and was replaced by former Cal Lutheran head coach Mike Dunlap for the 1994 season.

== Later life and death ==
Monson later resided in Spokane, as did his former boss and mentor Jud Heathcote, until Heathcote's death at 90 in August 2017. Monson died on October 1, 2025, at the age of 92.

== Head coaching record ==
=== College ===
Record table
Season	Team	Overall	Conference	Standing	Postseason
Idaho Vandals (Big Sky Conference) (1978–1983)
1978–79	Idaho	11–15	4–10	8th	
1979–80	Idaho	17–10	9–5	2nd	
1980–81	Idaho	25–4	12–2	1st	NCAA Division I First Round
1981–82	Idaho	27–3	13–1	1st	NCAA Division I Sweet 16
1982–83	Idaho	20–9	9–5	T–3rd	NIT First Round
Idaho:		100–41 (.709)	47–23 (.671)		
Oregon Ducks (Pacific-10 Conference) (1983–1992)
1983–84	Oregon	16–13	11–7	3rd	NIT First Round
1984–85	Oregon	15–16	8–10	6th	
1985–86	Oregon	11–17	6–12	9th	
1986–87	Oregon	16–14	8–10	7th	
1987–88	Oregon	16–14	10–8	5th	NIT Second Round
1988–89	Oregon	8–21	3–15	9th	
1989–90	Oregon	15–14	10–8	5th	NIT First Round
1990–91	Oregon	13–15	8–10	T–5th	
1991–92	Oregon	6–21	2–16	10th	
Oregon:		116–145 (.444)	66–96 (.407)		
Total:		216–186 (.537)			
National champion Postseason invitational champion Conference regular season champion Conference regular season and conference tournament champion Division regular season champion Division regular season and conference tournament champion Conference tournament champion

=== NBL ===
Legend
Regular season	G	Games coached	W	Games won	L	Games lost	W–L %	Win–loss %
Playoffs	PG	Playoff games	PW	Playoff wins	PL	Playoff losses	PW–L %	Playoff win–loss %

Team	Year	G	W	L	W–L%	Finish	PG	PW	PL	PW–L%	Result
Adelaide 36ers	1993	28	14	14	.500	7th	2	0	2	.000	Quarter-finalists
Career		28	14	14	.500		2	0	2	.000	
