= 1981–82 Weber State Wildcats men's basketball team =

American college basketball season

1981–82 Weber State Wildcats men's basketball
- Conference: Big Sky Conference
- Record: 15–13 (6–8 Big Sky)
- Head coach: Neil McCarthy (7th season)
- Home arena: Dee Events Center

1981–82 Big Sky men's basketball standings
	Conf.				Overall
Team	W		L	PCT	W		L	PCT
No. 8 Idaho †	13	–	1	.929	27	–	3	.900
Montana	10	–	4	.714	17	–	10	.630
Nevada	9	–	5	.643	19	–	9	.679
Weber State	6	–	8	.429	15	–	13	.536
Boise State	6	–	8	.429	12	–	14	.462
Idaho State	5	–	9	.357	14	–	12	.538
Montana State	5	–	9	.357	11	–	18	.379
Northern Arizona	2	–	12	.143	6	–	20	.231
† Conference tournament winner Rankings from AP poll

The 1981–82 Weber State Wildcats men's basketball team represented Weber State College during the 1981–82 NCAA Division I men's basketball season. Members of the Big Sky Conference, the Wildcats were led by seventh-year head coach Neil McCarthy and played their home games on campus at Dee Events Center in Ogden, Utah.

The Wildcats were 15–12 overall in the regular season and 6–8 in conference play; despite dropping their final league game at home, they won the tiebreaker for fourth to participate in the conference tournament, hosted again by sixth-ranked Idaho at the Kibbie Dome in Moscow. In the opening semifinal, the Wildcats gave the host Vandals all they could handle at home, but fell short by two points.

Senior guard Todd Harper was named to the all-conference team, and junior forward Royal Edwards was honorable mention.

== Postseason result ==
Date time, TV	Rank^{#}	Opponent^{#}	Result	Record	Site (attendance) city, state
Big Sky tournament
Fri, March 5; 8:10 pm	(4)	at (1) No. 6 Idaho; Semifinal	L 55–57	15–13	Kibbie Dome (8,150); Moscow, Idaho
*Non-conference game. ^{#}Rankings from AP poll. (#) Tournament seedings in parentheses. All times are in Mountain time.
