= 1980–81 Weber State Wildcats men's basketball team =

American college basketball season

1980–81 Weber State Wildcats men's basketball
- Conference: Big Sky Conference
- Record: 8–19 (5–9 Big Sky)
- Head coach: Neil McCarthy (6th season)
- Home arena: Dee Events Center

1980–81 Big Sky men's basketball standings
	Conf.				Overall
Team	W		L	PCT	W		L	PCT
Idaho †	12	–	2	.857	25	–	4	.862
Montana	11	–	3	.786	19	–	9	.679
Montana State	11	–	3	.786	16	–	11	.593
Idaho State	6	–	8	.429	12	–	14	.462
Nevada	5	–	9	.357	11	–	15	.423
Weber State	5	–	9	.357	8	–	19	.296
Boise State	4	–	10	.286	7	–	19	.269
Northern Arizona	2	–	12	.143	8	–	17	.320
† Big Sky Conference tournament winner

The 1980–81 Weber State Wildcats men's basketball team represented Weber State College during the 1980–81 NCAA Division I men's basketball season. Members of the Big Sky Conference, the Wildcats were led by sixth-year head coach Neil McCarthy and played their home games on campus at Dee Events Center in Ogden, Utah.

In an unusual subpar season, the Wildcats were 8–19 overall in the regular season and 5–9 in conference play, tied for fifth place.

Weber State had appeared in the first five finals of the conference tournament and won the last three, but this year they did not even qualify for the four-team bracket. The Wildcats finished the regular season on a high note, with a three-game winning streak to avoid twenty losses; they also upset league champion Idaho earlier in February in Ogden.

Junior guard Ron Harper led the Big Sky in scoring and was named to the all-conference team.

== Roster ==
1980–81 Weber State Wildcats men's basketball team
Players
Coaches

Pos.	#	Name	Height	Weight	Year	Hometown
G/F	35	Royal Edwards	6 ft 6 in (1.98 m)	192 lb (87 kg)	So	Sacramento, California
G	12	Richard Escandon	6 ft 0 in (1.83 m)	140 lb (64 kg)	Fr	Lakeland, California
F/C	30	Carl Flageolle	6 ft 9 in (2.06 m)	182 lb (83 kg)	Fr	Denver, Colorado
G	14	Lewis Griffin	6 ft 1 in (1.85 m)	190 lb (86 kg)	Jr	Baltimore, Maryland
G	44	Todd Harper	6 ft 4 in (1.93 m)	188 lb (85 kg)	Jr	San Diego, California
F/C	31	Doug Harris	6 ft 7 in (2.01 m)	204 lb (93 kg)	Jr	Berkeley, California
F	33	Gerald Mattison	6 ft 5 in (1.96 m)	215 lb (98 kg)	Sr	Rock Springs, Wyoming
F/C	34	Jeff Smith	6 ft 8 in (2.03 m)	210 lb (95 kg)	So	Colorado Springs, Colorado
G	25	Kent Smith	6 ft 4 in (1.93 m)	183 lb (83 kg)	Jr	Flint, Michigan

Head coach

- Neil McCarthy

Assistant coach(es)

Legend

- (C) Team captain
- (S) Suspended
- (I) Ineligible
- (W) Walk-on
- Injured
- Current redshirt
