= 1979–80 Boise State Broncos men's basketball team =

American college basketball season

1979–80 Boise State Broncos men's basketball
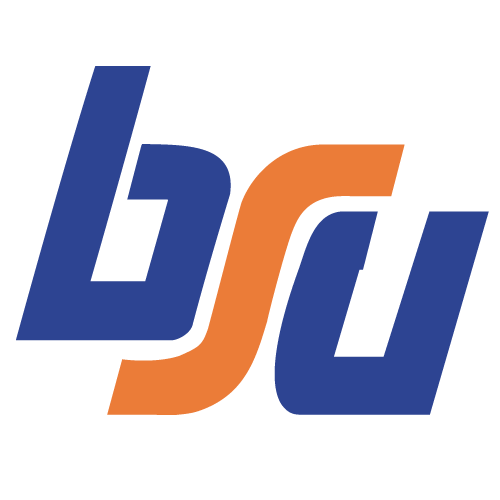
- Conference: Big Sky Conference
- Record: 10–16 (4–10 Big Sky)
- Head coach: Bus Connor (7th season)
- Assistant coach: Doug Oliver
- Home arena: Bronco Gymnasium

1979–80 Big Sky men's basketball standings
	Conf.				Overall
Team	W		L	PCT	W		L	PCT
No. 17 Weber State †	13	–	1	.929	26	–	3	.897
Idaho	9	–	5	.643	17	–	10	.630
Montana	8	–	6	.571	17	–	11	.607
Montana State	7	–	7	.500	14	–	12	.538
Nevada	5	–	9	.357	10	–	19	.345
Idaho State	5	–	9	.357	9	–	17	.346
Northern Arizona	5	–	9	.357	14	–	12	.538
Boise State	4	–	10	.286	10	–	16	.385
† Conference tournament winner Rankings from AP poll

The 1979–80 Boise State Broncos men's basketball team represented Boise State University during the 1979–80 NCAA Division I men's basketball season. Led by seventh-year head coach Bus Connor, the Broncos played their home games on campus at Bronco Gymnasium in Boise, Idaho.

Boise State finished the regular season at 10–16 overall, with a 4–10 record in the Big Sky Conference, last in the standings. BSU defeated rival Idaho in overtime in the Kibbie Dome on January 12; it was the Vandals' only home loss of the season and their last at home for over three years.

Connor announced his resignation, effective at the end of the season, with five games remaining. The Broncos lost four straight, then defeated Nevada in the finale on February 23 at Boise. Dave Leach, an assistant at Oregon State under Ralph Miller, became head coach in mid-March.

No Broncos were named to the all-conference team; center Dave Richardson and guard Dave Williams were honorable mention.
