= 1981–82 Boise State Broncos men's basketball team =

American college basketball season

1981–82 Boise State Broncos men's basketball
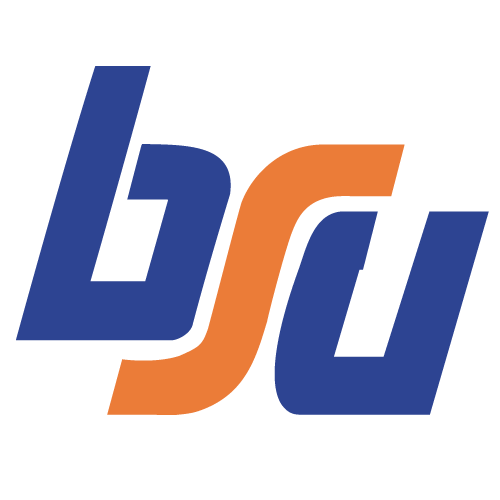
- Conference: Big Sky Conference
- Record: 12–14 (6–8 Big Sky)
- Head coach: Dave Leach (2nd season)
- Home arena: Bronco Gymnasium

1981–82 Big Sky men's basketball standings
	Conf.				Overall
Team	W		L	PCT	W		L	PCT
No. 8 Idaho †	13	–	1	.929	27	–	3	.900
Montana	10	–	4	.714	17	–	10	.630
Nevada	9	–	5	.643	19	–	9	.679
Weber State	6	–	8	.429	15	–	13	.536
Boise State	6	–	8	.429	12	–	14	.462
Idaho State	5	–	9	.357	14	–	12	.538
Montana State	5	–	9	.357	11	–	18	.379
Northern Arizona	2	–	12	.143	6	–	20	.231
† Conference tournament winner Rankings from AP poll

The 1981–82 Boise State Broncos men's basketball team represented Boise State University during the 1981–82 NCAA Division I men's basketball season. The Broncos were led by second-year head coach Dave Leach and played their home games on campus at the Bronco Gymnasium in Boise, Idaho.

They finished the regular season at 12–14 overall, with a 6–8 record in the Big Sky Conference, tied for fourth in the standings. The conference tournament included only the top four teams; the Broncos lost the tiebreaker to Weber State for the final berth, and did not qualify for a fourth consecutive year.

This was the last season for varsity basketball at the 1950s Bronco Gym, and its finale against rival Idaho was sold out two weeks in advance. BSU needed a win (with a Weber State loss) to qualify for the Big Sky tourney, for a quick re-match with Idaho six nights later at the Kibbie Dome in Moscow. A record crowd of 3,946 saw the Broncos test the ninth-ranked Vandals, but fell by six; the capacity of the gym at the time was listed at 3,682. The new BSU Pavilion opened in May, for commencement exercises.

No Broncos were named to the all-conference team; forward Eric Bailey, guard Terry Lee, and sophomore swingman Vince Hinchen were honorable mention.
