= 1979–80 Weber State Wildcats men's basketball team =

American college basketball season

1979–80 Weber State Wildcats men's basketball

Big Sky champions
- Conference: Big Sky Conference

Ranking
- Coaches: No. 17
- AP: No. 17
- Record: 26–3 (13–1 Big Sky)
- Head coach: Neil McCarthy (5th season)
- Home arena: Dee Events Center

1979–80 Big Sky men's basketball standings
	Conf.				Overall
Team	W		L	PCT	W		L	PCT
No. 17 Weber State †	13	–	1	.929	26	–	3	.897
Idaho	9	–	5	.643	17	–	10	.630
Montana	8	–	6	.571	17	–	11	.607
Montana State	7	–	7	.500	14	–	12	.538
Nevada	5	–	9	.357	10	–	19	.345
Idaho State	5	–	9	.357	9	–	17	.346
Northern Arizona	5	–	9	.357	14	–	12	.538
Boise State	4	–	10	.286	10	–	16	.385
† Conference tournament winner Rankings from AP poll

The 1979–80 Weber State Wildcats men's basketball team represented Weber State College during the 1979–80 NCAA Division I men's basketball season. Members of the Big Sky Conference, the Wildcats were led by fifth-year head coach Neil McCarthy and played their home games on campus at Dee Events Center in Ogden, Utah.

They were 24–2 overall in the regular season and 13–1 in conference play, won the regular season title (by four games), and the conference tournament. The sole conference loss was at Idaho, the league runner-up, which broke an 18-game winning streak and dropped Weber's poll ranking (AP, UPI) from 15 to 17.

The Wildcats appeared in the first five finals of the conference tournament and this was the third consecutive title.

Ranked seventeenth in both major polls, Weber State earned the Big Sky's berth in the expanded 48-team NCAA tournament. They were seeded seventh in the West region and hosted the subregional in Ogden, but were upset by a point by Lamar.

== All-conference ==
Senior guard Bruce Collins was a unanimous selection to the all-conference team, becoming the seventh player to be named in three consecutive years. Joining him for a second straight year was senior forward David Johnson. On the second team was senior center Richard Smith and senior guard Mark Mattos; forward Gerald Mattinson and sophomore reserve guard Todd Harper were honorable mention.

A four-year starter, Collins scored over two thousand points for the Wildcats, including 32 in his final game, the NCAA loss to Lamar. He was edged out for player of the year honors by guard Don Newman of Idaho, which had finished last in each of the previous five seasons.

== Postseason results ==
Date time, TV	Rank^{#}	Opponent^{#}	Result	Record	Site (attendance) city, state
Big Sky tournament
Fri, Feb 29; 7:00 pm	(1) No. 16	(4) Montana State; Semifinal	W 93–70	25–2	Dee Events Center (8,089); Ogden, Utah
Sat, March 1; 8:00 pm	(1) No. 16	(3) Montana; Final	W 50–42	26–2	Dee Events Center (8,247); Ogden, Utah
NCAA tournament
Thu, March 6*; 9:37 pm	(7W) No. 17	(10W) Lamar; First round	L 86–87	26–3	Dee Events Center (11,505); Ogden, Utah
*Non-conference game. ^{#}Rankings from AP poll. (#) Tournament seedings in parentheses. All times are in Mountain time.
