= 1993–94 UC Irvine Anteaters men's basketball team =

American college basketball season

1993–94 UC Irvine Anteaters men's basketball
- Conference: Big West Conference
- Record: 10–20 (4–14 Big West)
- Head coach: Rod Baker (3rd season)
- Home arena: Bren Events Center

1993–94 Big West men's basketball standings
	Conf.				Overall
Team	W		L	PCT	W		L	PCT
New Mexico State †	12	–	6	.667	23	–	8	.742
Long Beach State	11	–	7	.611	17	–	10	.630
San Jose State	11	–	7	.611	15	–	12	.556
Utah State	11	–	7	.611	14	–	13	.519
Pacific	10	–	8	.556	17	–	14	.548
UNLV	10	–	8	.556	15	–	13	.536
UC Santa Barbara	9	–	9	.500	13	–	17	.433
Nevada	6	–	12	.333	11	–	17	.393
Cal State Fullerton	6	–	12	.333	8	–	19	.296
UC Irvine	4	–	14	.222	10	–	20	.333
† 1994 Big West tournament winner Rankings from AP poll

The 1993–94 UC Irvine Anteaters men's basketball team represented the University of California, Irvine during the 1993–94 NCAA Division I men's basketball season. The Anteaters were led by third year head coach Rod Baker and played at the Bren Events Center and were members of the Big West Conference. Despite finishing last in conference play, the Anteaters made a surprise run to the Big West tournament Final where they lost to New Mexico State.

== Previous season ==
The 1992–93 UC Irvine Anteaters men's basketball team finished the season with a record of 6–21 and 4–14 in Big West play.

== Roster ==
1993–94 UC Irvine Anteaters men's basketball team
Players
Coaches

Pos.	#	Name	Height	Weight	Year	Hometown
C		Dan Augulis	6 ft 10 in (2.08 m)	—	Fr
F		Jermaine Avie	6 ft 7 in (2.01 m)	—	Jr
F		Shaun Battle	6 ft 6 in (1.98 m)	—	So
C		DeForrest Boyer	6 ft 10 in (2.08 m)	—	Sr
G	11	Chris Brown	—	—	Jr
F		Khalid Channell	6 ft 7 in (2.01 m)	—	Jr
C		Joe Hannon	6 ft 9 in (2.06 m)	—	Sr
F		Khari Johnson	6 ft 6 in (1.98 m)	—	Sr
G		Troy Lane	—	—	Sr
F		Elzie Love	6 ft 6 in (1.98 m)	—	Jr
G		Lloyd Mumford	6 ft 2 in (1.88 m)	—	Sr
F		Mark Odsather	6 ft 7 in (2.01 m)	—	Jr
F		LaDay Smith	6 ft 7 in (2.01 m)	—	Jr
G		Shauhin Talesh	5 ft 11 in (1.8 m)	—	So
G		Todd Whitehead	6 ft 4 in (1.93 m)	—	So
G		Zuri Williams	6 ft 2 in (1.88 m)	—	Jr

Head coach

Rod Baker (College of the Holy Cross)

Assistant coach(es)

Legend

- (C) Team captain
- (S) Suspended
- (I) Ineligible
- (W) Walk-on
- Injured
- Current redshirt

Roster

== Schedule ==
Date time, TV	Rank^{#}	Opponent^{#}	Result	Record	Site (attendance) city, state
Regular Season
November 26, 1993*		Salem State	W 95–67	1–0	Bren Events Center (1,884); Irvine, California
November 30, 1993*		at Utah	L 66–92	1–1	Jon M. Huntsman Center (12,581); Salt Lake City
December 2, 1993*		San Diego	L 82–96	1–2	Bren Events Center (1,841); Irvine, California
December 11, 1993*		at Cal State Northridge	W 93–82	2–2	Matadome (651); Northridge, California
December 18, 1993		at Georgetown	L 64–93	2–3	USAir Arena (6,483); Landover, Maryland
December 21, 1993*		at St. Mary's	L 95–104	2–4	McKeon Pavilion (2,100); Moraga, California
December 29, 1993*		Iowa	W 86–78	3–4	Bren Events Center (3,172); Irvine, California
January 3, 1994		at Cal State Fullerton	W 77–71	4–4 (1–0)	Titan Gym (973); Fullerton, California
January 8, 1994*		Cal State Northridge	L 66–68	4–5	Bren Events Center (2,167); Irvine, California
January 11, 1994		UNLV	L 79–101	4–6 (1–1)	Bren Events Center (3,115); Irvine, California
January 15, 1994		at Nevada	L 85–98	4–7 (1–2)	Lawlor Events Center (5,393); Reno, Nevada
January 17, 1994		at Utah State	W 78–71	5–7 (2–2)	Smith Spectrum (6,196); Logan, Utah
January 20, 1994		Pacific	L 71–73	5–8 (2–3)	Bren Events Center (1,731); Irvine, California
January 22, 1994		San Jose State	L 76–89	5–9 (2–4)	Bren Events Center (2,789); Irvine, California
January 27, 1994		at Long Beach State	L 106–111 ^{OT}	5–10 (2–5)	The Pyramid (1,323); Long Beach, California
January 29, 1994		at UC Santa Barbara	L 88–92 ^{OT}	5–11 (2–6)	UC Santa Barbara Events Center (3,772); Santa Barbara, California
February 3, 1994		at San Jose State	L 67–72	5–12 (2–7)	Event Center Arena (2,491); San Jose, California
February 5, 1994		at Pacific	L 79–88	5–13 (2–8)	Alex G. Spanos Center (2,491); Stockton, California
February 10, 1994		Utah State	L 77–79 ^{OT}	5–14 (2–9)	Bren Events Center (1,723); Irvine, California
February 12, 1994		Nevada	W 99–70	6–14 (3–9)	Bren Events Center (2,213); Irvine, California
February 17, 1994		at New Mexico State	L 60–90	6–15 (3–10)	Pan American Center (6,749); Las Cruces, New Mexico
February 19, 1994		at UNLV	L 64–80	6–16 (3–11)	Thomas & Mack Center (8,560); Paradise, Nevada
February 24, 1994		Cal State Fullerton	L 95–101	6–17 (3–12)	Bren Events Center (1,729); Irvine, California
February 26, 1994		No. 25 New Mexico State	W 95–87	7–17 (4–12)	Bren Events Center (2,112); Irvine, California
March 3, 1994		UC Santa Barbara	L 77–81	7–18 (4–13)	Bren Events Center (2,259); Irvine, California
March 5, 1994		Long Beach State	L 72–91	7–19 (4–14)	Bren Events Center (2,849); Irvine, California
Big West Conference tournament
March 10, 1994		vs. UC Santa Barbara; First Round	W 53–48	8–19	Thomas & Mack Center (1,285); Paradise, Nevada
March 11, 1994		vs. Utah State; Quarterfinals	W 78–68	9–19	Thomas & Mack Center (1,977); Paradise, Nevada
March 12, 1994		vs. Pacific; Semifinals	W 82–78	10–19	Thomas & Mack Center (8,959); Paradise, Nevada
March 13, 1994		vs. New Mexico State; Championship Game	L 64–70	10–20	Thomas & Mack Center (4,052); Paradise, Nevada
*Non-conference game. ^{#}Rankings from AP Poll. (#) Tournament seedings in parentheses. All times are in Pacific Time.
