= 1983 Big Sky Conference men's basketball tournament =

- Classification: Division I
- Season: 1982–83
- Teams: 4
- Site: Centennial Coliseum; Reno, Nevada
- Champions: Weber State (4th title)
- Winning coach: Neil McCarthy (4th title)
- MVP: Ken Green (Nevada)

1982–83 Big Sky men's basketball standings
	Conf.				Overall
Team	W		L	PCT	W		L	PCT
Nevada	10	–	4	.714	18	–	11	.621
Weber State †	10	–	4	.714	23	–	8	.742
Montana	9	–	5	.643	21	–	8	.724
Idaho	9	–	5	.643	20	–	9	.690
Idaho State	7	–	7	.500	10	–	17	.370
Boise State	5	–	9	.357	10	–	17	.370
Montana State	3	–	11	.214	10	–	17	.370
Northern Arizona	3	–	11	.214	10	–	16	.385
† Conference tournament winner

The 1983 Big Sky Conference men's basketball tournament was held March 11–12 at Centennial Coliseum in Reno, Nevada.

Weber State defeated Nevada in the championship game 87–78 to clinch their fourth Big Sky tournament title. The Wildcats and Wolf Pack were the regular season co-champions, while Idaho was attempting to win a third consecutive title.

This was the twentieth season for the Big Sky and its first employing the three-point shot, for conference play only, with the line at 22 feet (6.71 m). The NCAA adopted the three-point shot for the 1986–87 season, at a considerably shorter 19 ft 9 in (6.02 m).

== Format ==
First played in 1976, the Big Sky tournament had the same format for its first eight editions. The regular season champion hosted and only the top four teams from the standings took part, with seeding based on regular season conference records.

No teams made their inaugural tournament appearances this season. This year was the final Big Sky tournament with four teams; it expanded to include all eight teams in 1984.

The first tiebreaker in the standings were the head-to-head meetings; Nevada defeated Weber twice during the conference regular season, so the Wolf Pack won the regular season title. Montana defeated defending champion Idaho in both games to claim the third seed in the bracket.

== Bracket ==
Semifinals; Friday, March 11
1	Nevada	78
4	Idaho	73
3	Montana	53
2	Weber State	54

Championship; Saturday, March 12
1	Nevada	78
2	Weber State	87

== NCAA tournament ==
The Wildcats received an automatic bid to the 52-team NCAA tournament and were seeded ninth in the West region; they lost to Washington State by ten points in the first round in Boise, Idaho. No other Big Sky teams made the NCAA field; Idaho played in the 32-team NIT, the first-ever invite for the Big Sky, but lost in the first round to Oregon State at Corvallis.
