= 1993–94 New Mexico State Aggies basketball team =

American college basketball season

1993–94 New Mexico State Aggies men's basketball

Big West Regular season champions Big West tournament champions

NCAA tournament, First round (Vacated)
- Conference: Big West Conference
- Record: 23-7 (23–8 unadjusted) (12–6 Big West)
- Head coach: Neil McCarthy (9th season)
- Home arena: Pan American Center

1993–94 Big West men's basketball standings
	Conf.				Overall
Team	W		L	PCT	W		L	PCT
New Mexico State †	12	–	6	.667	23	–	8	.742
Long Beach State	11	–	7	.611	17	–	10	.630
San Jose State	11	–	7	.611	15	–	12	.556
Utah State	11	–	7	.611	14	–	13	.519
Pacific	10	–	8	.556	17	–	14	.548
UNLV	10	–	8	.556	15	–	13	.536
UC Santa Barbara	9	–	9	.500	13	–	17	.433
Nevada	6	–	12	.333	11	–	17	.393
Cal State Fullerton	6	–	12	.333	8	–	19	.296
UC Irvine	4	–	14	.222	10	–	20	.333
† 1994 Big West tournament winner Rankings from AP poll

The 1993–94 New Mexico State Aggies basketball team represented New Mexico State University in the 1993–94 college basketball season. This was Neil McCarthy's 9th season as head coach. The Aggies played their home games at Pan American Center and competed in the Big West Conference. They finished the season 23–8, 12–6 in Big West play to tie for the conference regular season title. They won the Big West tournament, and received an automatic bid to the NCAA tournament as No. 13 seed in the Midwest region.

In the opening round, New Mexico State was defeated by No. 4 seed Oklahoma State, 65–55.

== Roster ==
1993–94 New Mexico State Aggies men's basketball team
Players	Coaches
Pos. / # / Name / Height / Weight / Year / Hometown; F / 21 / James Dockery / 6 ft 8 in (2.03 m) / — / Sr	Head coach: Neil McCarthy (Sacramento State); Assistant coach(es) Legend: (C) Team captain; (S) Suspended; (I) Ineligible; (W) Walk-on; Injured; Current redshirt

== Schedule and results ==
Date time, TV	Rank^{#}	Opponent^{#}	Result	Record	Site (attendance) city, state
Regular season
Nov 20, 1993*		Simon Fraser University	W 91–44	1–0	Pan American Center; Las Cruces, New Mexico
Nov 29, 1993*		New Mexico Highlands	W 121–81	2–0	Pan American Center; Las Cruces, New Mexico
Dec 3, 1993*		UTEP	W 72–64	3–0	Pan American Center; Las Cruces, New Mexico
Dec 6, 1993*		at UTEP	L 72–76	3–1	Don Haskins Center; El Paso, Texas
Dec 11, 1993*		at New Mexico	W 112–104 ^{2OT}	4–1	University Arena; Albuquerque, New Mexico
Dec 20, 1993*		New Mexico	W 63–62	5–1	Pan American Center; Las Cruces, New Mexico
Dec 22, 1993*		Southern Utah	W 82–65	6–1	Pan American Center; Las Cruces, New Mexico
Dec 30, 1993*		Morgan State	W 97–56	7–1	Pan American Center; Las Cruces, New Mexico
Jan 3, 1994		UC Santa Barbara	W 92–71	8–1 (1–0)	Pan American Center; Las Cruces, New Mexico
Jan 5, 1994		Long Beach State	W 94–76	9–1 (2–0)	Pan American Center; Las Cruces, New Mexico
Jan 8, 1994		at Cal State Fullerton	W 77–64	10–1 (3–0)	Titan Gym; Fullerton, California
Jan 10, 1994*		East Tennessee State	W 58–52	11–1	Pan American Center; Las Cruces, New Mexico
Jan 17, 1994		at UNLV	W 95–91 ^{OT}	12–1 (4–0)	Thomas & Mack Center; Las Vegas, Nevada
Jan 20, 1994		Utah State	W 82–71	13–1 (5–0)	Pan American Center; Las Cruces, New Mexico
Jan 22, 1994		Nevada	W 92–84	14–1 (6–0)	Pan American Center; Las Cruces, New Mexico
Jan 27, 1994	No. 25	at San Jose State	W 60–59	15–1 (7–0)	The Event Center; San Jose, California
Jan 29, 1994	No. 25	at Pacific	W 95–94 ^{OT}	16–1 (8–0)	Alex G. Spanos Center; Stockton, California
Feb 3, 1994	No. 23	at Nevada	L 68–77	16–2 (8–1)	Lawlor Events Center; Reno, Nevada
Feb 5, 1994	No. 23	at Utah State	L 68–69	16–3 (8–2)	Dee Glen Smith Spectrum; Logan, Utah
Feb 14, 1994		UNLV	W 67–66	17–3 (9–2)	Pan American Center; Las Cruces, New Mexico
Feb 17, 1994		UC Irvine	W 90–60	18–3 (10–2)	Pan American Center; Las Cruces, New Mexico
Feb 19, 1994		Cal State Fullerton	W 85–68	19–3 (11–2)	Pan American Center; Las Cruces, New Mexico
Feb 24, 1994		at Long Beach State	L 83–84	19–4 (11–3)	The Gold Mine; Long Beach, California
Feb 26, 1994		at UC Irvine	L 87–95	19–5 (11–4)	Bren Events Center; Irvine, California
Feb 28, 1994		at UC Santa Barbara	L 69–77	19–6 (11–5)	The Thunderdome; Santa Barbara, California
Mar 3, 1994		Pacific	W 86–73	20–6 (12–5)	Pan American Center; Las Cruces, New Mexico
Mar 5, 1994		San Jose State	L 67–71 ^{OT}	20–7 (12–6)	Pan American Center; Las Cruces, New Mexico
Big West tournament
Mar 11, 1994*		vs. Nevada; Quarterfinals	W 68–67 ^{OT}	21–7	Thomas & Mack Center; Las Vegas, Nevada
Mar 12, 1994*		at UNLV; Semifinals	W 82–64	22–7	Thomas & Mack Center; Las Vegas, Nevada
Mar 13, 1994*		vs. UC Irvine; Championship game	W 70–64	23–7	Thomas & Mack Center; Las Vegas, Nevada
NCAA tournament
Mar 18, 1994*	(13 MW)	vs. (4 MW) No. 19 Oklahoma State; First round	L 55–65	23–8	Myriad Convention Center; Oklahoma City, Oklahoma
*Non-conference game. ^{#}Rankings from AP Poll. (#) Tournament seedings in parentheses. MW=Midwest. All times are in Mountain Time.
