= Neil McCarthy (basketball) =

American basketball coach (1939–2021)

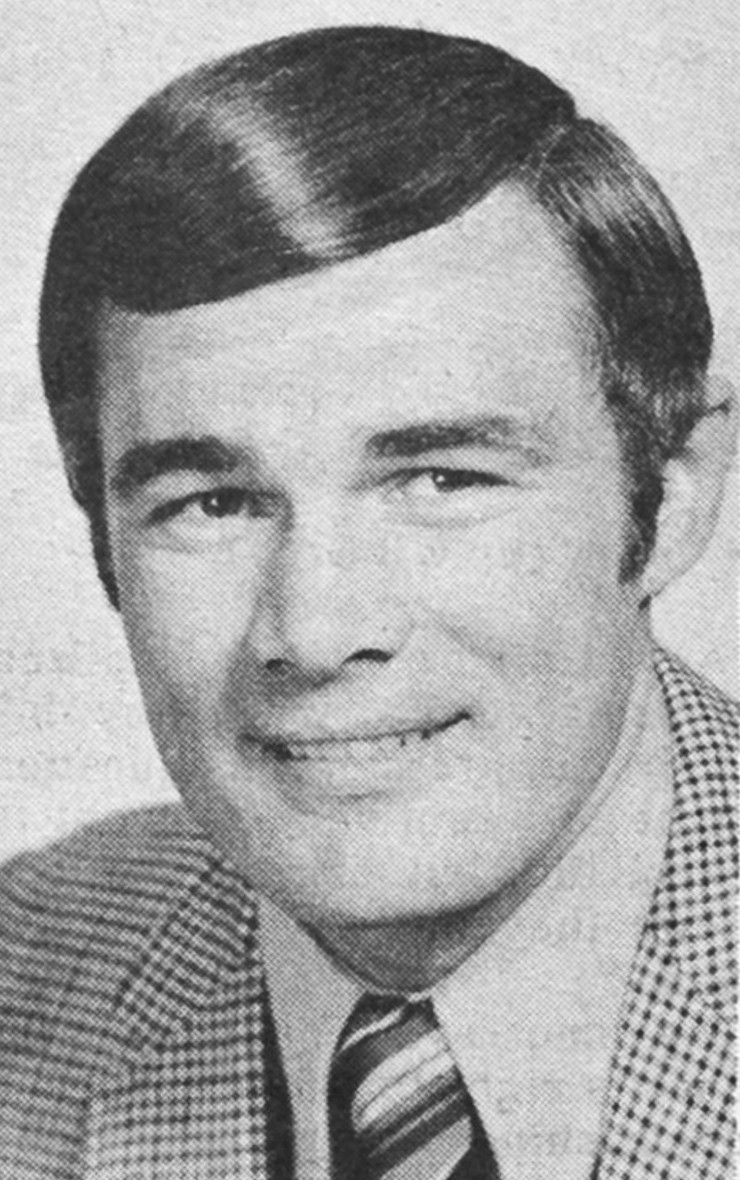

Biographical details
- Born: May 18, 1939; San Francisco, California, U.S.
- Died: September 18, 2021 (aged 82); Salt Lake City, Utah, U.S.

Playing career
- 1963–1964: Sacramento State

Coaching career (HC unless noted)
- 1974–1985: Weber State
- 1985–1997: New Mexico State

Head coaching record
- Overall: 419–209

Accomplishments and honors

Championships
- 5 Big Sky regular season (1976, 1979, 1980, 1983, 1984); 4 Big Sky tournament (1978–1980, 1983; 2 Big West regular season (1990, 1994); Big West East Division (1997); 2 Big West tournament (1992, 1994)

Awards
- 3× Big Sky Coach of the Year (1978, 1980, 1983); 2× Big West Coach of the Year (1989, 1990)

Neil McCarthy (May 18, 1939 – September 18, 2021) was an American college basketball coach. He was head coach of the Weber State Wildcats team from 1974 to 1985 and at the New Mexico State Aggies from 1985 to 1997.

At Weber State, McCarthy led the Wildcats to four NCAA tournaments, including the school's first NCAA Tournament win since reaching the Sweet 16 in 1972. He remained Weber State's winningest coach until Randy Rahe broke his wins record in 2016.

During most of McCarthy's tenure at New Mexico State, the Aggies were the second-best team in what became the Big West Conference, behind UNLV. After UNLV hit the skids, McCarthy took advantage and led the Aggies to four straight Big West tournament titles and four straight NCAA Tournaments from 1990 to 1994. His best team was the 1991–92 unit, which advanced all the way to the Sweet 16—the Aggies' deepest run in the tournament since the 1970 Final Four unit.

McCarthy was abruptly fired just weeks before the start of practice for the 1997–98 season. Athletic director Jim Paul cited a number of factors, principally the basketball team's poor performance in the classroom. McCarthy only graduated nine players in his 12 years at the school (an 11 percent graduation rate), including only one in his last four years. In Paul's view, this meant that McCarthy emphasized winning over academics. He left New Mexico State as the school's winningest coach, but has since been passed by Lou Henson.

Officially, McCarthy was reassigned as an assistant athletic director for the balance of his contract. However, he resigned rather than assume that post.

== Academic scandals ==
Despite McCarthy's success in building two regional powers, two major academic scandals forced his departure from the coaching profession.

In early 1995, it emerged that six players had received help from one of McCarthy's assistants on their work at correspondence courses, including answers on their exams. After this came to light, New Mexico State withdrew from postseason consideration for the 1995-96 season. In July 1996, the NCAA placed New Mexico State on three years' probation and stripped the Aggies of their NCAA tournament appearances in 1992, 1993 and 1994. Although McCarthy was not involved in the violations, the NCAA severely criticized him for not properly controlling the program. It slapped him with a two-year "show-cause" order, meaning that if he ever left New Mexico State, any penalties imposed on him would have followed him to his new employer unless that school demonstrated that he had served his punishment.

After his ouster, McCarthy sued New Mexico State for wrongful termination. During a deposition related to that suit, McCarthy admitted under oath that he had entered into a verbal agreement to hire Fletcher Cockrell, then the head coach at Jones County Community College in Mississippi, as an assistant coach if two of his star players signed with New Mexico State. Cockrell helped the players with their coursework and exams.

After the violations came to light, New Mexico State withdrew from postseason consideration for the 2000–01 season, and placed the basketball team on two years' probation. The NCAA accepted New Mexico State's penalties, but imposed an additional four years' probation and forced the Aggies to vacate every game they played in 1996–97 and 1997–98. It also slapped McCarthy with a five-year show-cause order. Cockrell, who had been involved in violations at another school, received a 10-year show-cause order. The final report noted the similarities with the 1996 case. It also strongly hinted that had the Aggies not taken swift corrective action, the penalties might have been even harsher, and possibly included the "death penalty". However, it praised New Mexico State for forcing out McCarthy, the school president and Paul's predecessor as athletic director.

== Death ==
McCarthy died at his home in Utah on September 18, 2021.

== Head coaching record ==
Record table
Season	Team	Overall	Conference	Standing	Postseason
Weber State Wildcats (Big Sky Conference) (1975–1985)
1974–75	Weber State	5–7*			
1975–76	Weber State	21–11	9–5	T–1st	
1976–77	Weber State	20–8	11–3	2nd	
1977–78	Weber State	19–10	9–5	3rd	NCAA Division I first round
1978–79	Weber State	25–9	10–4	1st	NCAA Division I second round
1979–80	Weber State	26–3	13–1	1st	NCAA Division I first round
1980–81	Weber State	8–19	5–9	T–5th	
1981–82	Weber State	15–13	6–8	T–4th	
1982–83	Weber State	23–8	10–4	T–1st	NCAA Division I first round
1983–84	Weber State	23–8	12–2	1st	NIT second round
1984–85	Weber State	20–9	9–5	3rd	
Weber State:		205–98 (.677)	94–46 (.671)		
New Mexico State Aggies (Pacific Coast Athletic Association / Big West Conference) (1985–1997)
1985–86	New Mexico State	18–12	10–8	3rd	
1986–87	New Mexico State	15–15	9–9	T–4th	
1987–88	New Mexico State	16–16	8–10	T–6th	
1988–89	New Mexico State	21–11	12–6	2nd	NIT first round
1989–90	New Mexico State	26–5	16–2	T–1st	NCAA Division I first round
1990–91	New Mexico State	23–6	15–3	2nd	NCAA Division I first round
1991–92	New Mexico State	25–8*	12–6	3rd	NCAA Division I Sweet 16*
1992–93	New Mexico State	26–8*	15–3	1st	NCAA Division I second round*
1993–94	New Mexico State	23–8*	12–6	1st	NCAA Division I first round*
1994–95	New Mexico State	25–10	13–5	2nd	NIT second round
1995–96	New Mexico State	11–15	8–10	T–7th	
1996-97	New Mexico State	19–9**	12–4**	T–1st (East)**	
New Mexico State:		248–123 (.668)	142–72 (.664)		
Total:		419–209 (.667)			
National champion Postseason invitational champion Conference regular season champion Conference regular season and conference tournament champion Division regular season champion Division regular season and conference tournament champion Conference tournament champion

* New Mexico State was forced to vacate its 1992, 1993 and 1994 NCAA appearances due to academic fraud. Official records for those seasons are 23–7, 25–7 and 23–7, respectively.
** Entire 1996–97 season, as well as share of Big West title, vacated due to academic fraud.
% Official record at New Mexico State is 226–111 (130–68 Big West) without vacated games.
