= Manhattan Vocational and Technical High School =

Public school in New York City

Coordinates: 40.783339°N 73.945836°W

Manhattan Vocational and Technical High School is a former high school located in New York City. It closed in 1984. It was located on east 96th street. In 1968 it was pad locked as a result of a teachers strike.

== Notable alumni ==
- Ken Owens, basketball player and coach
- Rick Rasmussen, professional surfer

== See also ==
- List of high schools in New York City
