= 1994 Big West Conference men's basketball tournament =

- Classification: Division I
- Season: 1993–94
- Teams: 10
- Site: Thomas & Mack Center; Paradise, NV
- Champions: New Mexico State (2nd title)
- Winning coach: Neil McCarthy (2nd title)
- MVP: Chris Brown & James Dockery (UC Irvine & New Mexico State)

1993–94 Big West men's basketball standings
| | Conf. | | | | Overall |
| Team | W | | L | PCT | W | | L | PCT |
|---|---|---|---|---|---|---|---|---|
| New Mexico State † | 12 | – | 6 | .667 | 23 | – | 8 | .742 |
| Long Beach State | 11 | – | 7 | .611 | 17 | – | 10 | .630 |
| San Jose State | 11 | – | 7 | .611 | 15 | – | 12 | .556 |
| Utah State | 11 | – | 7 | .611 | 14 | – | 13 | .519 |
| Pacific | 10 | – | 8 | .556 | 17 | – | 14 | .548 |
| UNLV | 10 | – | 8 | .556 | 15 | – | 13 | .536 |
| UC Santa Barbara | 9 | – | 9 | .500 | 13 | – | 17 | .433 |
| Nevada | 6 | – | 12 | .333 | 11 | – | 17 | .393 |
| Cal State Fullerton | 6 | – | 12 | .333 | 8 | – | 19 | .296 |
| UC Irvine | 4 | – | 14 | .222 | 10 | – | 20 | .333 |
† 1994 Big West tournament winner Rankings from AP poll

The 1994 Big West Conference men's basketball tournament was held March 10–13 at the Thomas & Mack Center in Paradise, Nevada. This was the first Big West/PCAA tournament played outside the state of California.

Top-seeded New Mexico State defeated UC Irvine (the tournament's lowest-seeded team, with only 4 conference wins) in the final, 70–64, to capture their second PCAA/Big West title.

The Aggies subsequently received an automatic bid to the 1994 NCAA tournament.

== Format ==
For the second straight year, there were changes to the tournament format.

The Big West returned to a ten-team tournament with all conference members in participation. With all teams seeded and paired based on conference regular-season records, the top six teams were given byes into the quarterfinal round while the four lowest-seeded teams were placed in a preliminary first round.

As a result of the field's expansion, this was the first tournament for second-year Big West member Nevada.

== Bracket ==
First round Thursday, March 10
9 | Cal State Fullerton | 64
8 | Nevada | 68
7 | UC Santa Barbara | 48
10 | UC Irvine | 53

Quarterfinals; Friday, March 11
1 | New Mexico State | 68
8 | Nevada | 67
5 | UNLV | 80
4 | San Jose State | 69
3 | Long Beach State | 73
6 | Pacific | 87
10 | UC Irvine | 78
2 | Utah State | 68

Semifinals; Saturday, March 12
1 | New Mexico State | 82
5 | UNLV | 64
6 | Pacific | 78
10 | UC Irvine | 82

Championship; Sunday, March 13
1 | New Mexico State | 70
10 | UC Irvine | 64
