= 1980–81 Boise State Broncos men's basketball team =

American college basketball season

1980–81 Boise State Broncos men's basketball
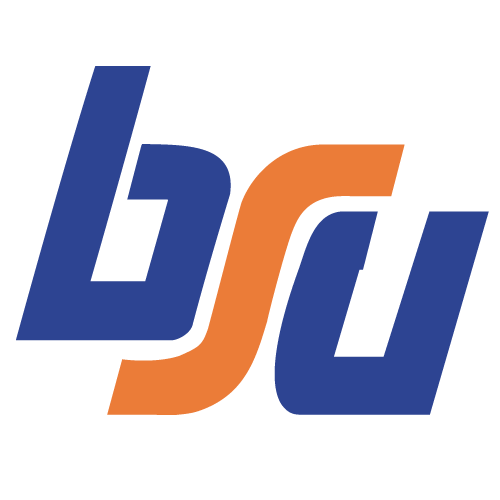
- Conference: Big Sky Conference
- Record: 7–19 (4–10 Big Sky)
- Head coach: Dave Leach (1st season)
- Assistant coach: Prescott Smith
- Home arena: Bronco Gymnasium

1980–81 Big Sky men's basketball standings
| | Conf. | | | | Overall |
| Team | W | | L | PCT | W | | L | PCT |
|---|---|---|---|---|---|---|---|---|
| Idaho † | 12 | – | 2 | .857 | 25 | – | 4 | .862 |
| Montana | 11 | – | 3 | .786 | 19 | – | 9 | .679 |
| Montana State | 11 | – | 3 | .786 | 16 | – | 11 | .593 |
| Idaho State | 6 | – | 8 | .429 | 12 | – | 14 | .462 |
| Nevada | 5 | – | 9 | .357 | 11 | – | 15 | .423 |
| Weber State | 5 | – | 9 | .357 | 8 | – | 19 | .296 |
| Boise State | 4 | – | 10 | .286 | 7 | – | 19 | .269 |
| Northern Arizona | 2 | – | 12 | .143 | 8 | – | 17 | .320 |
† Big Sky Conference tournament winner

The 1980–81 Boise State Broncos men's basketball team represented Boise State University during the 1980–81 NCAA Division I men's basketball season. The Broncos were led by first-year head coach Dave Leach and played their home games on campus at Bronco Gymnasium in Boise, Idaho.

They finished the regular season at 7–19 overall, with a 4–10 record in the Big Sky Conference, seventh in the standings.

Leach was hired in March from Oregon State, where he had spent the previous decade as an assistant under Ralph Miller. Assistant coach Prescott Smith also moved over from OSU, and was earlier at Portland State.

No Broncos were named to the all-conference team; center Larry McKinney was on the second team.
