= 1982–83 Boise State Broncos men's basketball team =

American college basketball season

1982–83 Boise State Broncos men's basketball
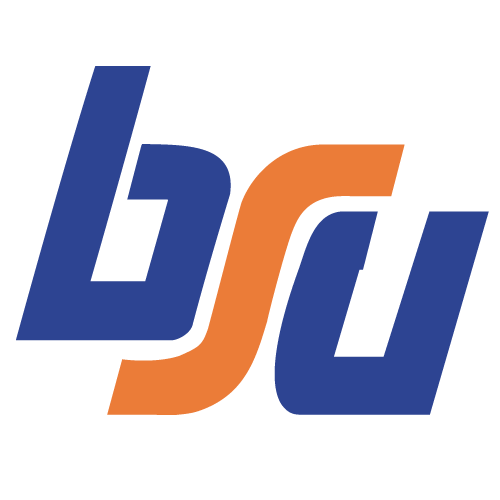
- Conference: Big Sky Conference
- Record: 10–17 (5–9 Big Sky)
- Head coach: Dave Leach (3rd season)
- Assistant coaches: Mike Conklin; Prescott Smith
- Home arena: BSU Pavilion

1982–83 Big Sky men's basketball standings
	Conf.				Overall
Team	W		L	PCT	W		L	PCT
Nevada	10	–	4	.714	18	–	11	.621
Weber State †	10	–	4	.714	23	–	8	.742
Montana	9	–	5	.643	21	–	8	.724
Idaho	9	–	5	.643	20	–	9	.690
Idaho State	7	–	7	.500	10	–	17	.370
Boise State	5	–	9	.357	10	–	17	.370
Montana State	3	–	11	.214	10	–	17	.370
Northern Arizona	3	–	11	.214	10	–	16	.385
† Conference tournament winner

The 1982–83 Boise State Broncos men's basketball team represented Boise State University during the 1982–83 NCAA Division I men's basketball season. The Broncos were led by third-year head coach Dave Leach and played their home games on campus at the new BSU Pavilion in Boise, Idaho.

They finished the regular season at 10–17 overall, with a 5–9 record in the Big Sky Conference, sixth in the standings. The conference tournament included only the top four teams for the eighth and final time; the Broncos did not qualify for a fifth consecutive year.

With one game remaining, at rival Idaho, athletic director Gene Bleymaier announced in late February that Leach's one-year contract at $33,000 would not be renewed. Bobby Dye of Cal State Bakersfield was hired as head coach in late March at $41,000.

No Broncos were on the all-conference team; junior swingman Vince Hinchen was named to the second team.
