= Don Newman (basketball) =

American basketball player-coach (1957–2018)

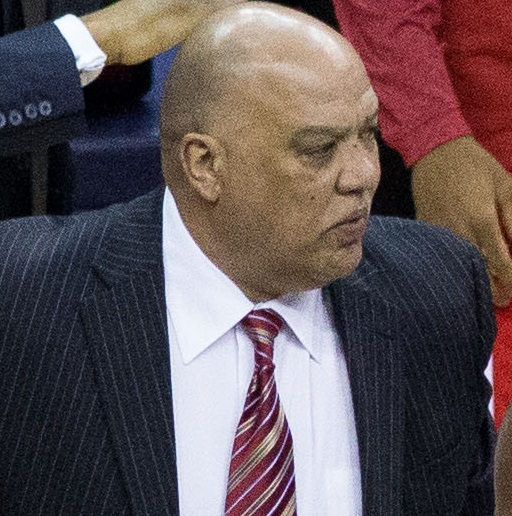
- Newman with Washington Wizards in 2013

Personal information
- Born: November 22, 1957 New Orleans, Louisiana, U.S.
- Died: September 11, 2018 (aged 60) New Orleans, Louisiana, U.S.
- Listed height: 6 ft 3 in (1.91 m)

Career information
- High school: Brother Martin (New Orleans, Louisiana)
- College: LSU (1975–1976); Florida Gateway (1976); Idaho (1978–1980)
- NBA draft: 1980: 3rd round, 69th overall pick
- Drafted by: Boston Celtics
- Playing career: 1980–1983
- Position: Guard
- Coaching career: 1986–2016

Career history

Playing
- 1980–1983: Montana Golden Nuggets

Coaching
- 1986–1987: Moscow HS (sophomores)
- 1987–1992: Washington State (assistant)
- 1992–1997: Sacramento State
- 1997–1998: Arizona State
- 1999–2003: Milwaukee Bucks (assistant)
- 2003–2004: New Jersey Nets (assistant)
- 2004–2012: San Antonio Spurs (assistant)
- 2012–2016: Washington Wizards (assistant)

Career highlights
- As player: Big Sky Player of the Year (1980); First-team All-Big Sky (1980); Second-team All-Big Sky (1979); As assistant coach: 2× NBA champion (2005, 2007)
- Stats at Basketball Reference

Donald David Newman (November 22, 1957 – September 11, 2018) was an American professional athlete in basketball and Canadian football. Following his playing career, he was the head basketball coach at Sacramento State from 1992 to 1997, and Arizona State for the 1997–98 season. He also was an assistant coach in the NBA with the New Jersey Nets, San Antonio Spurs, and Washington Wizards.

== Early life ==
Born and raised in New Orleans, Louisiana, Newman was a multi-sport athlete at its Brother Martin High School and graduated in 1975. In his junior year, he was a teammate of Rick Robey on the Crusaders' state championship basketball team.

== College career ==
Newman attended Louisiana State University in Baton Rouge as a freshman in the 1975–76 season and played on the LSU Tigers basketball team. After the year, he transferred to Lake City Community College, where he played one total game in the early part of the 1976–77 season, and then transferred to Grambling State University, where he did not play at all. In fall 1978 he transferred once again, this time to the University of Idaho in Moscow. Newman did not play at Grambling and played only one game with Lake City.

After sitting out a year due to transfer rules, Newman played for the Idaho Vandals from 1978 to 1980 under new head coach Don Monson. Following five consecutive years in the Big Sky cellar, Idaho rose to second place in the conference standings in Newman's senior season and qualified for the four-team conference tournament for the first time; he was a unanimous first-team all-conference selection, and was the player of the year. Prior to his senior year, Newman was selected in fourth round of the 1979 NBA draft by the Indiana Pacers; then was taken in the third round in 1980 by the Boston Celtics. Veteran guard Nate Archibald was a holdout during training camp, but after he agreed to terms in October, Boston head coach Bill Fitch cut Newman two days before their first regular season game; the Celtics went on to win the NBA title that season.

Newman also played center field for the Vandal baseball team in 1979, and was inducted into the UI athletics hall of fame in 2018.

== Football career ==
Don Newman
Profile
- Position: Wide receiver

Personal information
- Listed height: 6 ft 3 in (1.91 m)
- Listed weight: 205 lb (93 kg)

Career information
- High school: Brother Martin (New Orleans, Louisiana)
- College: Idaho

Career history
- 1981: Seattle Seahawks*
- 1981–1983: Saskatchewan Roughriders
- 1984: Montreal Concordes
- 1985: New York Jets*
- 1985: Ottawa Rough Riders
- 1986: Hamilton Tiger-Cats
- * Offseason or practice squad member only

Although he had not played high school or college football, Newman tried out for the Seattle Seahawks as a cornerback in 1981. He played in the Canadian Football League with the Saskatchewan Roughriders (1981–1983), Montreal Concordes (1984), Ottawa Rough Riders (1985), and Hamilton Tiger-Cats (1986) as a wide receiver.

While playing pro football, Newman also played pro basketball for three seasons in the Continental Basketball Association (CBA) with the Montana Golden Nuggets (in Great Falls), with George Karl as head coach.

== Coaching career ==
=== High school ===
Returning to northern Idaho in 1985, Newman was an assistant football coach at Lewiston High School for a season, then an assistant football coach and sophomore basketball coach at Moscow High School; he also worked as shoe department manager at a local store while coaching high school sports. Newman completed his bachelor's degree in physical education from the University of Idaho in 1987.

=== College ===
From 1987 to 1992, Newman was an assistant coach at neighboring Washington State in Pullman under Kelvin Sampson, and earned his master's degree in education from WSU in 1989. The Cougars made the NIT in his final year as an assistant there.

From 1992 to 1997, Newman was head coach of Sacramento State. In five seasons with a Hornets program that was transitioning from Division II to Division I, he had a 20–114 (.149) record. He then became an assistant at Arizona State in Tempe, and was appointed the head coach in September 1997 following the resignation of Bill Frieder. In his only season at ASU, Newman had an 18–14 record, concluded with a first-round loss in the NIT.

=== NBA ===
In 1999, Newman became an assistant coach for the Milwaukee Bucks under George Karl, and moved to the New Jersey Nets in 2003. In 2004, Newman joined Gregg Popovich's staff at the San Antonio Spurs. After eight seasons with the Spurs that included two NBA titles in 2005 and 2007, he joined Randy Wittman's staff at the Washington Wizards in 2012.

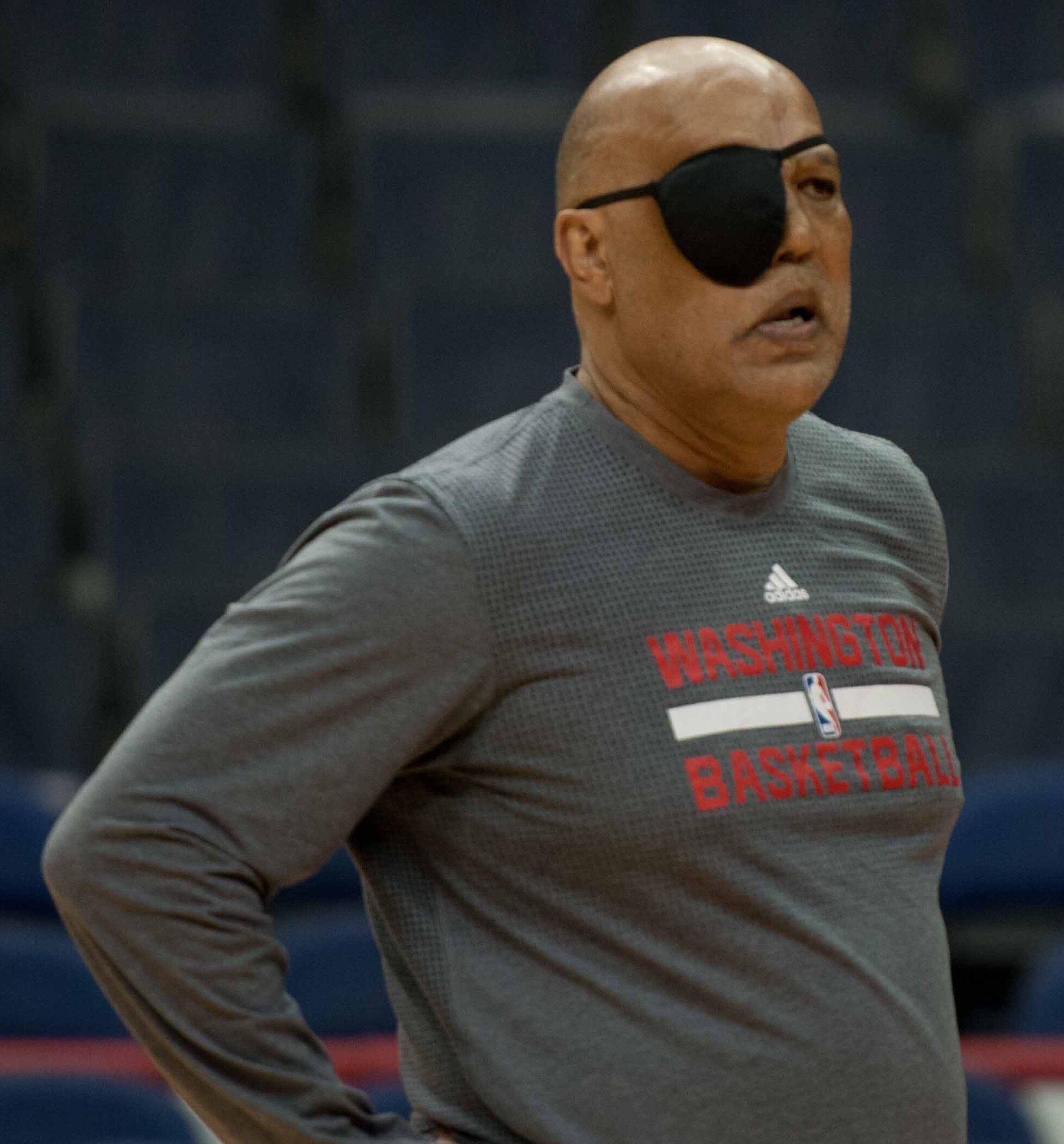
Newman in 2015

== Death ==
After a long battle with brain cancer, Newman died at age 60 at his New Orleans home on September 11, 2018.

== Head coaching record ==
Don Newman coaching record:

Record table
Season	Team	Overall	Conference	Standing	Postseason
Sacramento State Hornets (NCAA Division I independent) (1992–1994)
1992–93	Sacramento State	3–24			
1993–94	Sacramento State	1–26			
Sacramento State Hornets (American West Conference) (1994–1996)
1994–95	Sacramento State	6–21	2–4	3rd	
1995–96	Sacramento State	7–20	2–4	T–3rd	
Sacramento State Hornets (Big Sky Conference) (1996–1997)
1996–97	Sacramento State	3–23	2–14	9th	
Sacramento State:		20–114 (.149)	6–22 (.214)		
Arizona State Sun Devils (Pacific-10 Conference) (1997–1998)
1997–98	Arizona State	18–14	8–10	T–5th	NIT First Round
Arizona State:		18–14 (.563)	8–10 (.444)		
Total:		38–128 (.229)			
