= 1981 Big Sky Conference men's basketball tournament =

- Classification: Division I
- Season: 1980–81
- Teams: 4
- Site: Kibbie Dome; Moscow, Idaho
- Champions: Idaho (1st title)
- Winning coach: Don Monson (1st title)
- MVP: Ken Owens (Idaho)

1980–81 Big Sky men's basketball standings
	Conf.				Overall
Team	W		L	PCT	W		L	PCT
Idaho †	12	–	2	.857	25	–	4	.862
Montana	11	–	3	.786	19	–	9	.679
Montana State	11	–	3	.786	16	–	11	.593
Idaho State	6	–	8	.429	12	–	14	.462
Nevada	5	–	9	.357	11	–	15	.423
Weber State	5	–	9	.357	8	–	19	.296
Boise State	4	–	10	.286	7	–	19	.269
Northern Arizona	2	–	12	.143	8	–	17	.320
† Big Sky Conference tournament winner

The 1981 Big Sky Conference men's basketball tournament was the sixth edition of the tournament, and was held March 6–7 at the Kibbie Dome at the University of Idaho in Moscow, Idaho.

Top-seeded Idaho defeated Montana in the championship game, 70–64, to clinch their first Big Sky tournament title.

== Format ==
First played in 1976, the Big Sky tournament had the same format for its first eight editions. The regular season champion hosted and only the top four teams from the standings took part, with seeding based on regular season conference records.

No new teams qualified for the Big Sky tournament this year. This was the first year in which three-time defending champion Weber State was not in the title game; the Wildcats tied for fifth and failed to make the field.

== Bracket ==
Semifinals; Friday, March 6
1	Idaho	69
4	Idaho State	45
3	Montana State	64
2	Montana	85

Championship; Saturday, March 7
1	Idaho	70
2	Montana	64

== NCAA tournament ==
The Vandals (25–3) received an automatic bid to the 48-team NCAA tournament, their first appearance, and were seeded seventh in the West region. They lost to Pittsburgh by a point in overtime at El Paso, Texas.
