= 1982 Big Sky Conference men's basketball tournament =

- Classification: Division I
- Season: 1981–82
- Teams: 4
- Site: Kibbie Dome; Moscow, Idaho
- Champions: Idaho (2nd title)
- Winning coach: Don Monson (2nd title)
- MVP: Ken Owens (Idaho)

1981–82 Big Sky men's basketball standings
	Conf.				Overall
Team	W		L	PCT	W		L	PCT
No. 8 Idaho †	13	–	1	.929	27	–	3	.900
Montana	10	–	4	.714	17	–	10	.630
Nevada	9	–	5	.643	19	–	9	.679
Weber State	6	–	8	.429	15	–	13	.536
Boise State	6	–	8	.429	12	–	14	.462
Idaho State	5	–	9	.357	14	–	12	.538
Montana State	5	–	9	.357	11	–	18	.379
Northern Arizona	2	–	12	.143	6	–	20	.231
† Conference tournament winner Rankings from AP poll

The 1982 Big Sky Conference men's basketball tournament was held March 5–6 at the Kibbie Dome at the University of Idaho in Moscow, Idaho.

Top-seeded Idaho defeated Nevada in the championship game, 85–80, to clinch their second consecutive (and second overall) Big Sky men's basketball tournament. Entering the conference tournament, Idaho was 24–2 and ranked sixth in both national polls (AP, UPI), then fell to eighth in both final polls the following week.

== Format ==
First played in 1976, the Big Sky tournament had the same format for its first eight editions. The regular season champion hosted and only the top four teams from the standings took part, with seeding based on regular season conference records. Idaho's sole conference loss was to Montana in Missoula.

Nevada–Reno made their first Big Sky tournament appearance in their third season in the conference.

== Bracket ==
Semifinals; Friday, March 5
1	#6 Idaho	57
4	Weber State	55
3	Nevada	97
2	Montana	93

Championship; Saturday, March 6
1	#6 Idaho	85
3	Nevada	80

== NCAA tournament ==
As Big Sky champions, the Vandals received an automatic bid to the 48-team NCAA tournament and were the third seed in the West region, behind Georgetown and Oregon State. Idaho received a first round bye, then played #16 Iowa in the second round in neighboring Pullman, winning in overtime. Four days later in the Sweet Sixteen in Provo, Utah, the Vandals fell to fourth-ranked and second seed Oregon State and finished with a 27–3 record.

The Big Sky has had a berth in the NCAA tournament since 1968, then a 23-team field; Idaho was the conference's sixth team to advance and the fifth to play in the Sweet Sixteen. Since the 1982 Vandals, only three Big Sky teams have advanced past the first round (Weber State (1995, 1999) and Montana in 2006), and none went past the Round of 32.
