= Richland High School (Washington) =

Coordinates: 46.278°N 119.288°W

Location
- 930 Long Avenue; Richland, (Benton County), Washington 99352; United States

Information
- Type: Public high school
- School district: Richland School District
- Staff: 100.51 (FTE)
- Enrollment: 2,234 (2023-2024)
- Student to teacher ratio: 22.23
- Colors: Green and gold
- Fight song: Fight Song (WSU)
- Mascot: B-17 “Archie”
- Nickname: Bombers
- Website: richland.rsd.edu

Richland High School is a public secondary school in Richland.

== History ==
The small farming community continued to develop as weapons production climbed during the Cold War, and the town was designated as a first-class city in 1958. Columbia High was renamed Richland High School.

Hanford was home to the Manhattan Project's B Reactor, the first full-scale plutonium production reactor in the world. Plutonium manufactured at the site was used in the nuclear bomb detonated over Nagasaki, Japan. Mushroom cloud logos are proudly displayed throughout the school, and the student body used to shout "nuke 'em" at sporting events.

Its depiction of a mushroom cloud as an unofficial logo for the school, believing that the logo and the mascot to be glorifying the dropping of the atomic bombs on Hiroshima and Nagasaki.

== Athletics ==
- Basketball: Richland has four boys’ state basketball championships: 1958, 1972, 1979, and 2026. The 1979 team included Brian Kellerman, who later played for the University of Idaho, earning Big Sky Conference's player of the year as a sophomore in 1981.

== Alumni ==
- Gene Conley: Class of 1948 – MLB pitcher and NBA forward
- Kathleen Flenniken: Class of 1978 – poet, Washington State Poet Laureate
- Santino Fontana: Class of 2000 – stage actor, director, and composer
- Brian Kellerman: Class of 1979 – basketball player
- James Mattis: Class of 1968 – USMC General, commander of U.S. Central Command, and Secretary of Defense
- Leon Rice: Class of 1981 – basketball coach at Boise State University
- Kathryn Ruemmler – White House Counsel to President Barack Obama June 2011 – June 2014
- Hope Solo: Class of 1999 – U.S. Soccer Federation and Women's Professional Soccer goalkeeper
- Kayla Barron: Class of 2006 – astronaut
- Eric Yardley: Class of 2009 – MLB pitcher
