= 1980 Big Sky Conference men's basketball tournament =

- Classification: Division I
- Season: 1979–80
- Teams: 4
- Site: Dee Events Center; Ogden, Utah
- Champions: Weber State (3rd title)
- Winning coach: Neil McCarthy (3rd title)
- MVP: Bruce Collins (Weber State)

1979–80 Big Sky men's basketball standings
	Conf.				Overall
Team	W		L	PCT	W		L	PCT
No. 17 Weber State †	13	–	1	.929	26	–	3	.897
Idaho	9	–	5	.643	17	–	10	.630
Montana	8	–	6	.571	17	–	11	.607
Montana State	7	–	7	.500	14	–	12	.538
Nevada	5	–	9	.357	10	–	19	.345
Idaho State	5	–	9	.357	9	–	17	.346
Northern Arizona	5	–	9	.357	14	–	12	.538
Boise State	4	–	10	.286	10	–	16	.385
† Conference tournament winner Rankings from AP poll

The 1980 Big Sky Conference men's basketball tournament was the fifth edition of the tournament, held February 29 and March 1 at the Dee Events Center at Weber State College in Ogden, Utah.

Top-seeded Weber State defeated Montana in the championship game, 50–42, to clinch their third consecutive Big Sky tournament title. The Wildcats had played in all five finals, dropping the first two.

== Format ==
Introduced in 1976, the Big Sky tournament had the same format for its first eight editions. The regular season champion hosted and only the top four teams from the standings took part, with seeding based on regular season conference records.

Second-seeded Idaho made its inaugural appearance in the conference tournament, having been in last place in the previous five seasons. Membership in the Big Sky remained at eight: Gonzaga left in the summer of 1979 for the WCAC and was replaced by Nevada–Reno.

== Bracket ==
Semifinals; Friday, February 29
1	#16 Weber State	93
4	Montana State	70
3	Montana	63
2	Idaho	53

Championship; Saturday, March 1
1	#16 Weber State	50
3	Montana	42

== NCAA tournament ==
Weber State received the automatic bid to the expanded 48-team NCAA tournament, and were seeded seventh in the West region. In the first round at their home venue in Ogden, the Wildcats lost by a point to Lamar.
