= Reno-Sparks Convention Center =

Convention center in Nevada

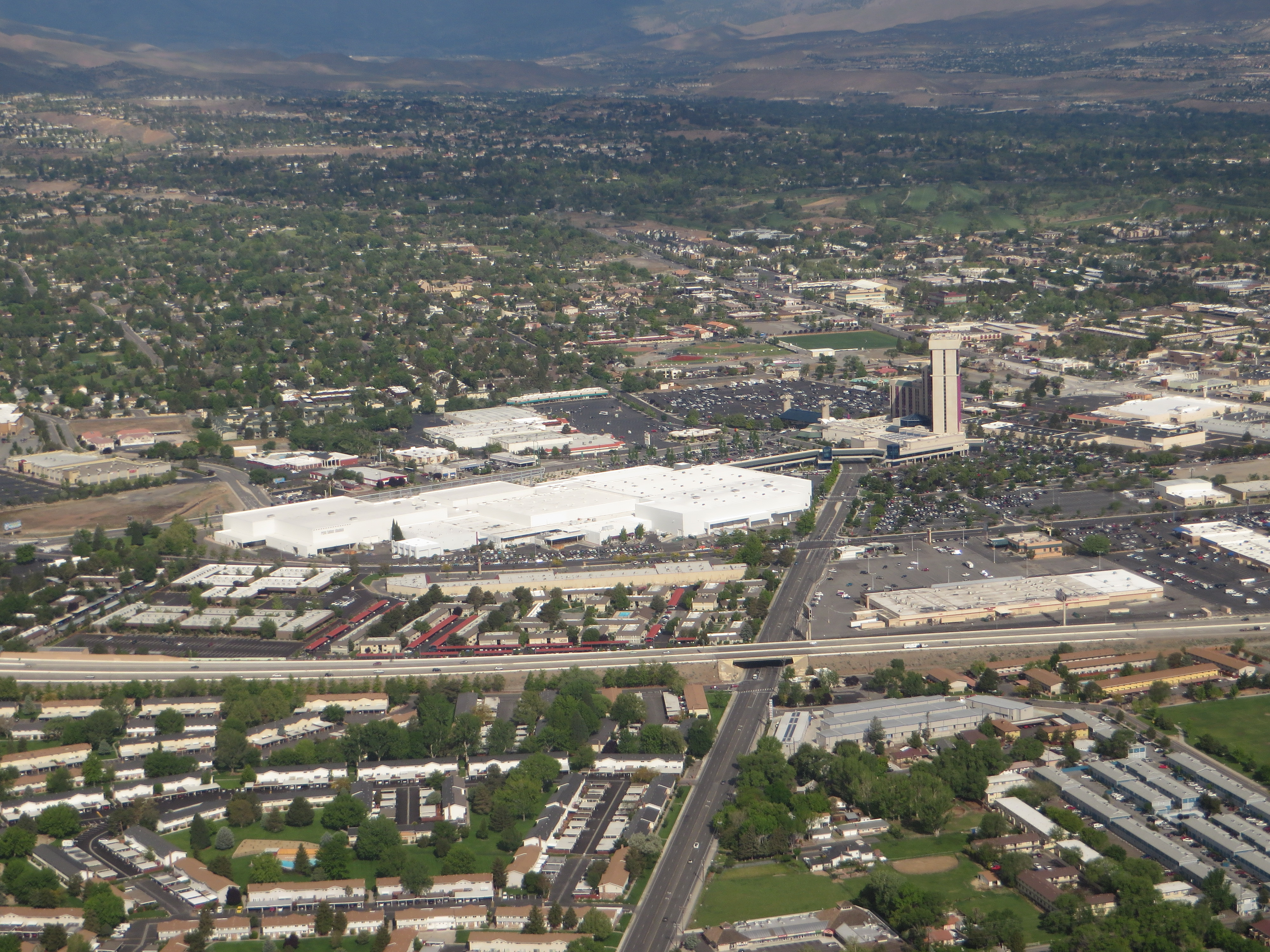

- Location in Nevada Location in the United States Location in North America
- Interactive map of Reno-Sparks Convention Center
- Former names: Centennial Coliseum
- Address: 4590 South Virginia Street
- Location: Reno, Nevada, U.S.
- Coordinates: 39.486°N 119.791°W
- Owner: Reno-Sparks Convention and Visitors Authority

Construction
- Built: 1965; 61 years ago
- Renovated: 2009

Website
- https://www.visitrenotahoe.com/event-venues/reno-sparks-convention-center

The Reno-Sparks Convention Center is a convention center in the western United States, located in Reno, Nevada. Opened 61 years ago in 1965 as Centennial Coliseum, it hosted the Big Sky Conference basketball tournament in 1983, and also hosts boxing matches. In 2021 the convention center will host the Legion Sports Fest, the largest fitness and bodybuilding event in the West. The Tommy Morrison vs. Carl Williams and George Foreman vs. Pierre Coetzer doubleheader professional boxing card was held at the Reno Sparks Convention Center on January 16, 1993.

Southwest of the airport, its elevation at street level is approximately 4,450 feet (1,355 m) above sea level.

== Entertainment ==
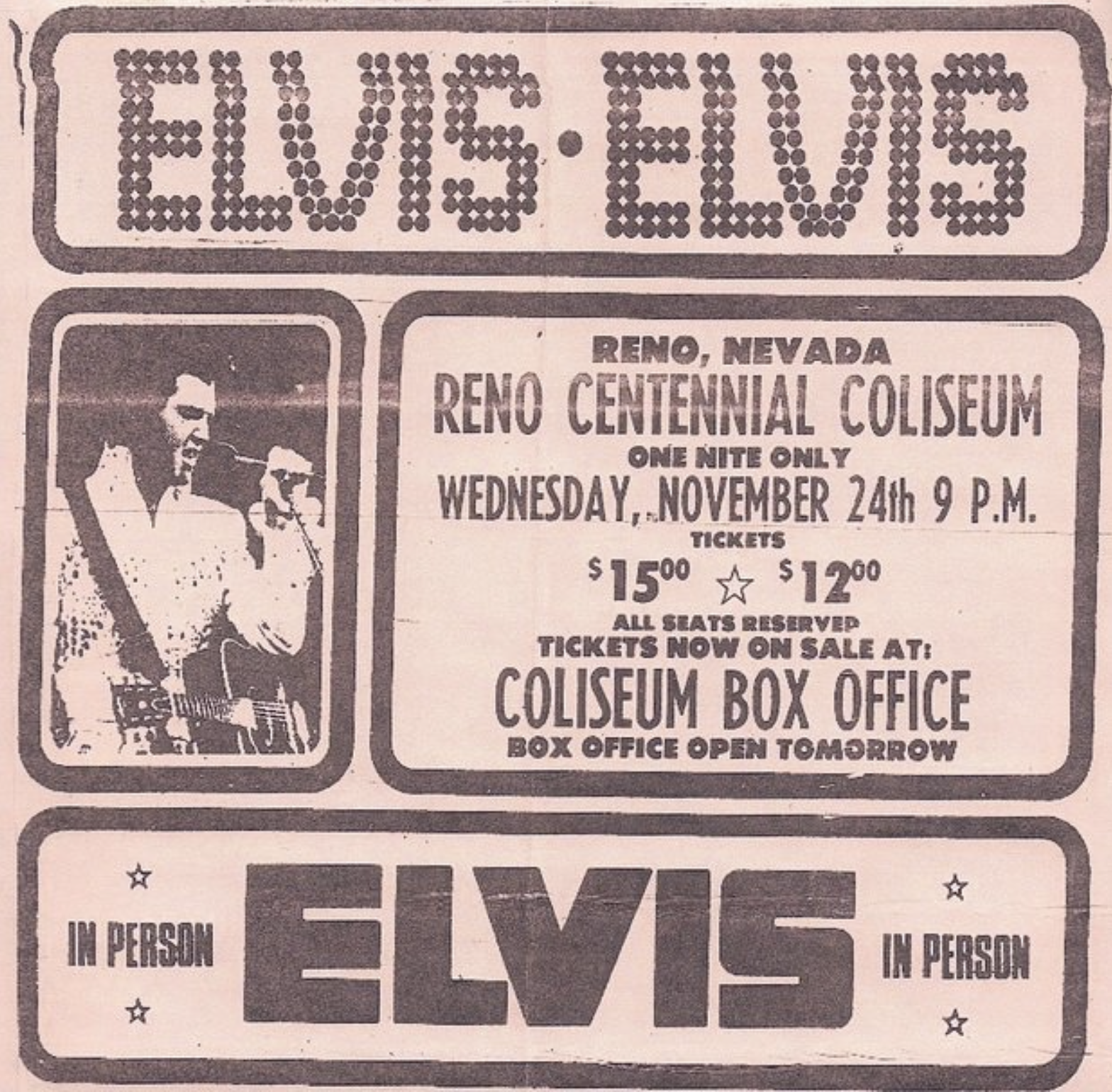
Elvis Presley Poster

As the Centennial Coliseum, the venue hosted musical performances by Elvis Presley in 1976, The Beach Boys in 1964, Glen Campbell in 1965, Def Leppard in 1980 and Grateful Dead in 1982.

== Facilities ==
The main exhibit space is 381,000 square feet (35,400 m^{2}), which can be divided into five halls. Freight access is provided via a set of nineteen freight doors, eight of which are drivable, and of which one is a hangar-style door that measures 39 feet (12 m) wide by 32 feet (10 m) tall.

In addition, the Mt. Rose Ballroom, a 30,000-square-foot (2,800 m^{2}) column-free space, can be divided into seven meeting rooms. A total of 53 meeting rooms, of capacities ranging from fifty to over three thousand, are available within the complex.

In 2007, a skybridge was built from the adjacent Atlantis Casino Resort Spa to the convention center.
