= Dee Events Center =

Multi-purpose events center in at Weber State University in Ogden, Utah, United States

- "The DEE" and "The Purple Palace"
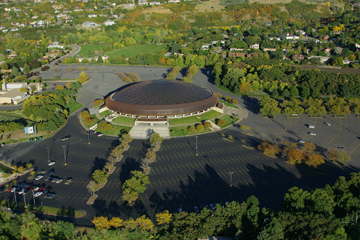
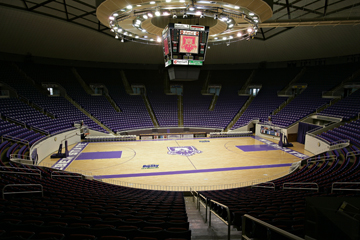
- Events center exterior (October 2002) and interior (September 2006)

- Location in the United States Location in Utah
- Interactive map of Dee Events Center
- Address: 4400 Harrison Boulevard; Ogden, Utah; United States
- Location: Weber State University
- Coordinates: 41°10′57″N 111°56′42″W
- Elevation: 4,780 feet (1,455 m) AMSL
- Owner: Weber State University
- Operator: Weber State University
- Capacity: 11,592
- Surface: Multi-surface
- Record attendance: 11,715 (vs. Idaho State, February 23, 1980)
- Public transit: OGX at Dee Events Center station

Construction
- Groundbreaking: March 21, 1975
- Opened: November 1, 1977; 48 years ago
- Cost: $11.4 million ($60.6 million in 2025)
- Architects: Robert A. Fowler and Associates
- Structural engineers: Reaveley Engineers & Associates
- General contractor: Acord-Harris Construction

Tenants
- Weber State Wildcats (NCAA) men's and women's basketball

Website
- www.weber.edu/financialservices/DeeEventsCenter.html

Dee Events Center is a multi-purpose indoor arena in the Western United States, located on the campus of Weber State University in Ogden, Utah. The circular, 11,592-seat domed arena, similar in design to many of the era, opened 49 years ago in 1977. It was named for the Lawrence T. Dee family, for his extensive contributions in building the arena.

== Description ==
It is the largest arena in Utah north of Salt Lake City and is home to the Weber State University Wildcats men's and women's basketball teams. It was home to the women's volleyball team until 2006.

The venue has hosted the Big Sky Conference men's basketball tournament ten times: 1979, 1980, 1984, 1995, 1999, 2003, 2007, 2009, 2010, and 2014. It has hosted first- and second-round NCAA tournament games three times, in 1980, 1986, and 1994, and the West Regionals in 1983, won by eventual national champion North Carolina State under Jim Valvano.

At the end of the 1995–96 season, a new basketball court floor was installed and after the 2005–06 season, a new court surface look was installed. In the summer of 2010, the Jumbotron was replaced by a new Pro-Star Vision Screen scoreboard. It features 4 HD LCD screens, an all LED display around the screens and a Pro-Add LED Display Ring on top. The front panel of the scorer's table is a Pro-Add LED Display. Both the ring and the scorer's table are full-color full-motion LED fascias. Also, added in this upgrade were LED scoreboards behind each basketball standard. Three-sided shot clocks were installed on top of each hoop including the running game time. During the summer of 2012, the court was once again re-surfaced to go along with the new logo also released that summer.

The elevation at street level is approximately 4,780 feet (1,455 m) above sea level, third-highest in the Big Sky.

== Basketball statistics ==
- All-Time WSU Men's Basketball Record - 1,024-586 (.636)
- Overall Record at the Dee Events Center (DEC) - 455-114 (.760)
- DEC Record - Big Sky Games - 266-63 (.809)
- Randy Rahe's DEC Record - 137-25 (.846)
- Rahe's DEC Record - Big Sky Games - 83-12 (.874)

== See also ==
- List of NCAA Division I basketball arenas
