= List of Gonzaga Bulldogs men's basketball seasons =

This is a list of seasons completed by the Gonzaga Bulldogs men's basketball team since the team's formation in 1907. They have been conference regular season champions 28 times and conference tournament champions 21 times. They have also appeared in 26 NCAA basketball tournaments, playing in the Round of 64 in each appearance, reaching the Round of 32 a total of 22 times, the Sweet Sixteen 14 times, the Elite Eight six times, and the Final Four twice. They played in their first NCAA national championship game in 2017, losing to North Carolina, and played in their second against Baylor in 2021.

== Seasons ==
Record table
Season	Team	Overall	Conference	Standing	Postseason
No coach (Independent) (1907–1908)
1907–08	No coach	9–2			
No coach:		9–2 (.818)	0–0 (–)		
George Varnell (Independent) (1908–1909)
1908–09	George Varnell	10–2			
George Varnell:		10–2 (.833)	0–0 (–)		
William Mulligan (Independent) (1909–1910)
1909–10	William Mulligan	11–3			
William Mulligan:		11–3 (.786)	0–0 (–)		
Frank McKevitt (Independent) (1910–1911)
1910–11	Frank McKevitt	8–1			
Frank McKevitt:		8–1 (.889)	0–0 (–)		
Fred Burns (Independent) (1911–1912)
1911–12	Fred Burns	4–2			
Fred Burns:		4–2 (.667)	0–0 (–)		
Ed Mulholland (Independent) (1912–1913)
1912–13	Ed Mulholland	4–2			
Ed Mulholland:		4–2 (.667)	0–0 (–)		
R. E. Harmon (Independent) (1913–1915)
1913–14	R.E. Harmon	5–2			
1914–15	R.E. Harmon	5–2			
R.E. Harmon:		10–4 (.714)	0–0 (–)		
William S. Higgins (Independent) (1915–1916)
1915–16	William S. Higgins	2–7			
William S. Higgins:		2–7 (.222)	0–0 (–)		
John F. McGough (Independent) (1916–1917)
1916–17	John F. McGough	4–5			
John F. McGough:		4–5 (.444)	0–0 (–)		
Guy Condon (Independent) (1917–1918)
1917–18	Guy Condon	3–2			
Guy Condon:		3–2 (.600)	0–0 (–)		
Edward Geheves (Independent) (1918–1920)
1918–19	Edward Geheves	8–4			
1919–20	Edward Geheves	1–13			
Edward Geheves:		9–17 (.346)	0–0 (–)		
Gus Dorais (Independent) (1920–1925)
1920–21	Gus Dorais	4–8			
1921–22	Gus Dorais	2–15			
1922–23	Gus Dorais	10–8			
1923–24	Gus Dorais	9–10			
1924–25	Gus Dorais	9–12			
Gus Dorais:		34–53 (.391)	0–0 (–)		
Maurice Smith (Independent) (1925–1931)
1925–26	Maurice Smith	16–7			
1926–27	Maurice Smith	8–16			
1927–28	Maurice Smith	9–16			
1928–29	Maurice Smith	14–12			
1929–30	Maurice Smith	8–7			
1930–31	Maurice Smith	7–8			
Maurice Smith:		62–66 (.484)	0–0 (–)		
S. Dagly (Independent) (1931–1932)
1931–32	S. Dagly	4–7			
S. Dagly:		4–7 (.364)	0–0 (–)		
Perry Ten Eyck (Independent) (1932–1933)
1932–33	Perry Ten Eyck	4–15			
Perry Ten Eyck:		4–15 (.211)	0–0 (–)		
Claude McGrath (Independent) (1933–1942)
1933–34	Claude McGrath	7–16			
1934–35	Claude McGrath	6–14			
1935–36	Claude McGrath	9–10			
1936–37	Claude McGrath	1–5			
1937–38	Claude McGrath	0–4			
1938–39	Claude McGrath	7–10			
1939–40	Claude McGrath	9–15			
1940–41	Claude McGrath	13–14			
1941–42	Claude McGrath	16–13			
Bill Frazier (Independent) (1942–1943)
1942–43	Bill Frazier	2–9			
Bill Frazier:		15–15 (.500)	0–0 (–)		
Charles Henry (Independent) (1943–1944)
1943–44	Charles Henry	22–4			
Charles Henry:		22–4 (.846)	0–0 (–)		
Eugene Wozny (Independent) (1944–1945)
1944–45	Eugene Wozny	12–19			
Eugene Wozny:		12–19 (.387)	0–0 (–)		
Gordon White (Independent) (1945–1946)
1945–46	Gordon White	6–14			
Gordon White:		6–14 (.300)	0–0 (–)		
Claude McGrath (Independent) (1946–1949)
1946–47	Claude McGrath	20–9			
1947–48	Claude McGrath	24–11			NAIB second round
1948–49	Claude McGrath	17–12			
Claude McGrath:		129–133 (.492)	0–0 (–)		
L. T. Underwood (Independent) (1949–1951)
1949–50	L.T. Underwood	18–11			
1950–51	L.T. Underwood	8–22			
L.T. Underwood:		26–33 (.441)	0–0 (–)		
Hank Anderson (Independent) (1951–1963)
1951–52	Hank Anderson	19–16			
1952–53	Hank Anderson	15–14			NAIB first round
1953–54	Hank Anderson	12–16			
1954–55	Hank Anderson	16–13			
1955–56	Hank Anderson	13–15			
1956–57	Hank Anderson	11–16			
1957–58	Hank Anderson	16–10			
1958–59	Hank Anderson	11–15			
1959–60	Hank Anderson	14–12			
1960–61	Hank Anderson	11–15			
1961–62	Hank Anderson	14–12			
1962–63	Hank Anderson	14–12			
Hank Anderson (Big Sky Conference) (1963–1972)
1963–64	Hank Anderson	10–15	5–5	T–3rd	
1964–65	Hank Anderson	18–8	6–4	T–2nd	
1965–66	Hank Anderson	19–7	8–2	T–1st	
1966–67	Hank Anderson	20–6	7–3	T–1st	
1967–68	Hank Anderson	9–17	6–9	T–4th	
1968–69	Hank Anderson	11–15	6–9	T–3rd	
1969–70	Hank Anderson	10–16	7–8	3rd	
1970–71	Hank Anderson	13–13	6–8	T–5th	
1971–72	Hank Anderson	14–12	8–6	T–2nd	
Hank Anderson:		290–275 (.513)	59–54 (.522)		
Adrian Buoncristiani (Big Sky Conference) (1972–1978)
1972–73	Adrian Buoncristiani	14–12	6–8	5th	
1973–74	Adrian Buoncristiani	13–13	7–7	4th	
1974–75	Adrian Buoncristiani	13–13	7–7	T–3rd	
1975–76	Adrian Buoncristiani	13–13	5–9	7th	
1976–77	Adrian Buoncristiani	11–16	7–7	3rd	
1977–78	Adrian Buoncristiani	14–15	7–7	5th	
Adrian Buoncristiani:		78–82 (.488)	39–45 (.464)		
Dan Fitzgerald (Big Sky Conference) (1978–1979)
1978–79	Dan Fitzgerald	16–10	7–7	T–4th	
Dan Fitzgerald (West Coast Conference) (1979–1981)
1979–80	Dan Fitzgerald	14–13	10–6	T–3rd	
1980–81	Dan Fitzgerald	19–8	9–5	3rd	
Jay Hillock (West Coast Conference) (1981–1985)
1981–82	Jay Hillock	15–12	7–7	T–4th	
1982–83	Jay Hillock	13–14	5–7	T–4th	
1983–84	Jay Hillock	17–11	6–6	4th	
1984–85	Jay Hillock	15–13	4–8	5th	
Jay Hillock:		60–50 (.545)	22–28 (.440)		
Dan Fitzgerald (West Coast Conference) (1985–1997)
1985–86	Dan Fitzgerald	15–13	8–6	4th	
1986–87	Dan Fitzgerald	18–10	9–5	2nd	
1987–88	Dan Fitzgerald	16–12	7–7	5th	
1988–89	Dan Fitzgerald	14–14	5–9	6th	
1989–90	Dan Fitzgerald	8–20	3–11	8th	
1990–91	Dan Fitzgerald	14–14	5–9	6th	
1991–92	Dan Fitzgerald	20–10	8–6	T–3rd	
1992–93	Dan Fitzgerald	19–9	11–3	2nd	
1993–94	Dan Fitzgerald	22–8	12–2	1st	NIT second round
1994–95	Dan Fitzgerald	21–9	7–7	4th	NCAA Division I first round
1995–96	Dan Fitzgerald	21–9	10–4	T–1st	NIT first round
1996–97	Dan Fitzgerald	15–12	8–6	T–4th	
Dan Fitzgerald:		252–171 (.596)	119–93 (.561)		
Dan Monson (West Coast Conference) (1997–1999)
1997–98	Dan Monson	24–10	10–4	1st	NIT second round
1998–99	Dan Monson	28–7	12–2	1st	NCAA Division I Elite Eight
Dan Monson:		52–17 (.754)	22–6 (.786)		
Mark Few (West Coast Conference) (1999–2026)
1999–00	Mark Few	26–9	11–3	2nd	NCAA Division I Sweet Sixteen
2000–01	Mark Few	26–7	13–1	1st	NCAA Division I Sweet Sixteen
2001–02	Mark Few	29–4	13–1	T–1st	NCAA Division I first round
2002–03	Mark Few	24–9	12–2	1st	NCAA Division I second round
2003–04	Mark Few	28–3	14–0	1st	NCAA Division I second round
2004–05	Mark Few	26–5	12–2	1st	NCAA Division I second round
2005–06	Mark Few	29–4	14–0	1st	NCAA Division I Sweet Sixteen
2006–07	Mark Few	23–11	11–3	1st	NCAA Division I first round
2007–08	Mark Few	25–8	13–1	1st	NCAA Division I first round
2008–09	Mark Few	28–6	14–0	1st	NCAA Division I Sweet Sixteen
2009–10	Mark Few	27–7	12–2	1st	NCAA Division I second round
2010–11	Mark Few	25–10	11–3	T–1st	NCAA Division I second round
2011–12	Mark Few	26–7	13–3	2nd	NCAA Division I second round
2012–13	Mark Few	32–3	16–0	1st	NCAA Division I second round
2013–14	Mark Few	29–7	15–3	1st	NCAA Division I second round
2014–15	Mark Few	35–3	17–1	1st	NCAA Division I Elite Eight
2015–16	Mark Few	28–8	15–3	T–1st	NCAA Division I Sweet Sixteen
2016–17	Mark Few	37–2	17–1	1st	NCAA Division I Runner-up
2017–18	Mark Few	32–5	17–1	1st	NCAA Division I Sweet Sixteen
2018–19	Mark Few	33–4	16–0	1st	NCAA Division I Elite Eight
2019–20	Mark Few	31–2	15–1	1st	No postseason held
2020–21	Mark Few	31–1	15–0	1st	NCAA Division I Runner-up
2021–22	Mark Few	28–4	13–1	1st	NCAA Division I Sweet Sixteen
2022–23	Mark Few	31–6	14–2	T–1st	NCAA Division I Elite Eight
2023–24	Mark Few	27–8	14–2	2nd	NCAA Division I Sweet Sixteen
2024–25	Mark Few	26–9	14–4	2nd	NCAA Division I second round
2025–26	Mark Few	31–4	16–2	T–1st	NCAA Division I second round
Mark Few (Pac-12 Conference) (2026–present)
2026–27	Mark Few	2–1			
Mark Few:		773–156 (.832)	377–42 (.900)		
Total:		1,893–1,157 (.621)			
National champion Postseason invitational champion Conference regular season champion Conference regular season and conference tournament champion Division regular season champion Division regular season and conference tournament champion Conference tournament champion
