= List of Gonzaga Bulldogs men's basketball head coaches =

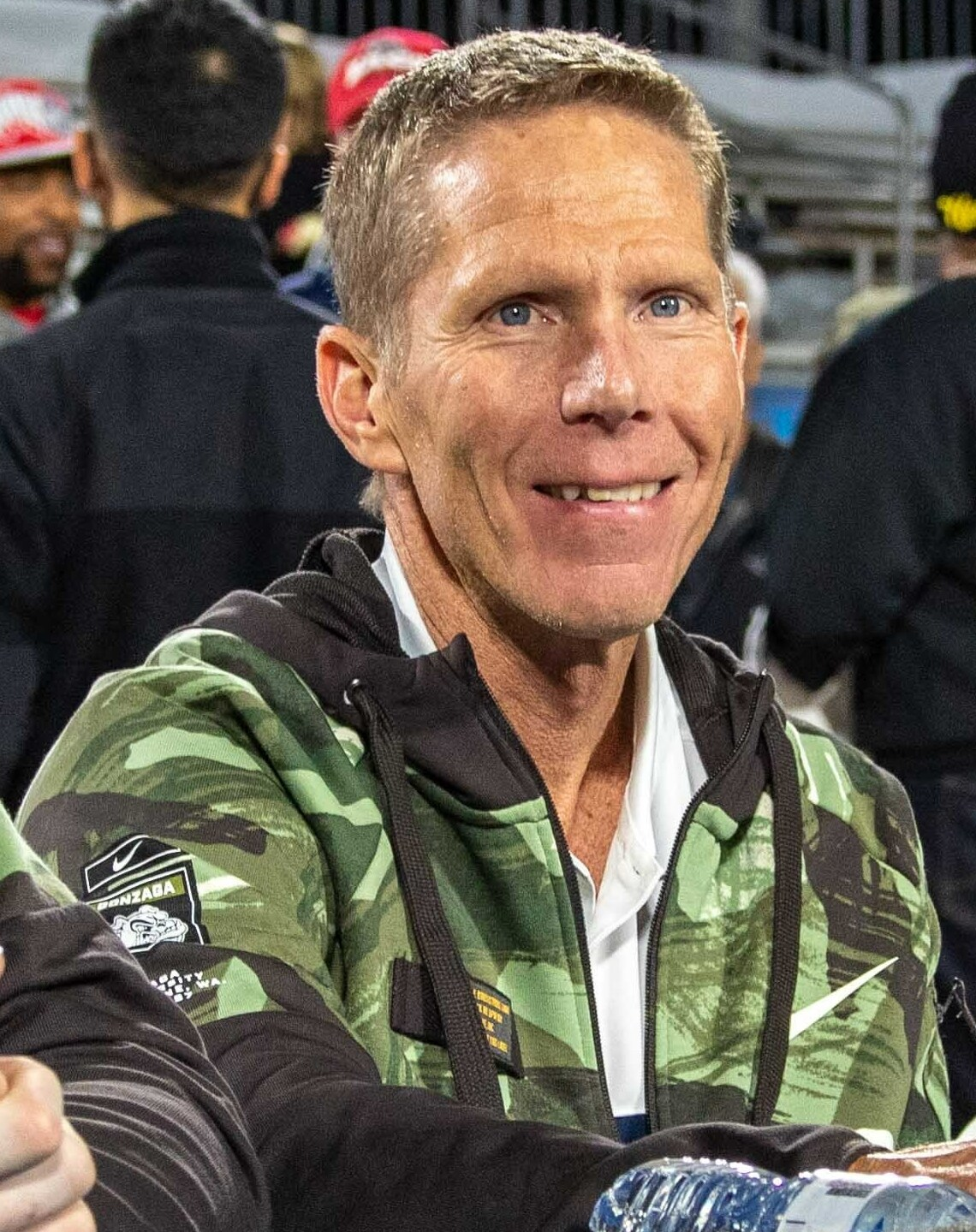
Mark Few, the current head coach of the Gonzaga Bulldogs, and the winningest head coach in Bulldogs men's basketball history.

The following is a list of Gonzaga Bulldogs men's basketball head coaches. There have been 26 head coaches of the Bulldogs in their 116-season history.

Gonzaga's current head coach is Mark Few. He was hired as the Bulldogs' head coach in July 1999, replacing Dan Monson, who left to become the head coach at Minnesota.

| No. | Tenure | Coach | Years | Record | Pct. |
|---|---|---|---|---|---|
| – | 1907–1908 | No coach | 1 | 9–2 | .818 |
| 1 | 1908–1909 | George Varnell | 1 | 10–2 | .833 |
| 2 | 1909–1910 | William Mulligan | 1 | 11–3 | .786 |
| 3 | 1910–1911 | Frank McKevitt | 1 | 8–1 | .889 |
| 4 | 1911–1912 | Fred Burns | 1 | 4–2 | .667 |
| 5 | 1912–1913 | Ed Mulholland | 1 | 4–2 | .667 |
| 6 | 1913–1915 | Robert E. Harmon | 2 | 10–4 | .714 |
| 7 | 1915–1916 | William S. Higgins | 1 | 2–7 | .222 |
| 8 | 1916–1917 | John F. McGough | 1 | 4–5 | .444 |
| 9 | 1917–1918 | Jimmy Condon | 1 | 3–2 | .600 |
| 10 | 1918–1920 | Edward Geheves | 2 | 9–17 | .346 |
| 11 | 1920–1926 | Gus Dorais | 6 | 14–16 | .467 |
| 12 | 1926–1931 | Maurice J. "Clipper" Smith | 5 | 46–59 | .438 |
| 13 | 1931–1932 | Sam Dagly | 1 | 4–7 | .364 |
| 14 | 1932–1933 | Perry Ten Eyck | 1 | 4–15 | .211 |
| 15 | 1933–1942; 1946–1949 | Claude McGrath | 12 | 129–133 | .492 |
| 16 | 1942–1943 | Bill Frazier | 1 | 2–9 | .182 |
| 17 | 1943–1944 | Charles Henry | 1 | 22–4 | .846 |
| 18 | 1944–1945 | Eugene Wozny | 1 | 12–19 | .387 |
| 19 | 1945–1946 | Gordon C. White | 1 | 6–14 | .300 |
| 20 | 1949–1951 | L. T. Underwood | 2 | 26–33 | .441 |
| 21 | 1951–1972 | Hank Anderson | 21 | 290–275 | .513 |
| 22 | 1972–1978 | Adrian Buoncristiani | 6 | 78–82 | .488 |
| 23 | 1978–1981; 1985–1997 | Dan Fitzgerald | 15 | 252–171 | .596 |
| 24 | 1981–1985 | Jay Hillock | 4 | 60–50 | .545 |
| 25 | 1997–1999 | Dan Monson | 2 | 52–17 | .754 |
| 26 | 1999–present | Mark Few | 24 | 688–135 | .836 |
| Totals | | 26 coaches | 116 seasons | 1,773–1,125 | .612 |
Records updated through end of 2022–23 season Source
