= 1966–67 Gonzaga Bulldogs men's basketball team =

American college basketball season

1966–67 Gonzaga Bulldogs men's basketball

Big Sky Co-champions
- Conference: Big Sky Conference
- Record: 21–6 (7–3 Big Sky)
- Head coach: Hank Anderson (16th season)
- Home arena: Kennedy Pavilion

1966–67 Big Sky men's basketball standings
	Conf.				Overall
Team	W		L	PCT	W		L	PCT
Gonzaga	7	–	3	.700	21	–	6	.778
Montana State	7	–	3	.700	15	–	11	.577
Weber State	5	–	5	.500	18	–	7	.720
Idaho	5	–	5	.500	15	–	12	.556
Idaho State	5	–	5	.500	11	–	16	.407
Montana	1	–	9	.100	7	–	17	.292

The 1966–67 Gonzaga Bulldogs men's basketball team represented Gonzaga University during the 1966–67 NCAA University Division basketball season. In the fourth season of the Big Sky Conference, the Bulldogs were led by sixteenth-year head coach Hank Anderson and played their home games on campus at Kennedy Pavilion in Spokane, Washington. They were 21–6 overall and 7–3 in conference play.

Gonzaga repeated as co-champions of the Big Sky, this time with Montana State; the conference did not yet have an automatic berth to the 23-team NCAA tournament, which came the next year. The 14-team National Invitation Tournament (NIT) was not interested in either team, and without a post-season berth on the line, no playoff was held.

Senior center Gary Lechman led the Big Sky in points, field goal percentage, and rebounding, while Gonzaga led in the team statistics.

== Schedule ==
Date time, TV	Rank^{#}	Opponent^{#}	Result	Record	Site city, state
Nov 25, 1966*		St. Martin’s	W 78–60	1–0	Spokane Coliseum
Nov 26, 1966*		British Columbia	W 89–73	2–0	Spokane Coliseum
Dec 1, 1966*		at St. Martin’s	W 96–79	3–0	
Dec 2, 1966*		at Washington State	L 70–72	3–1	
Dec 9, 1966*		at Tennessee State	W 89–74	4–1	
Dec 10, 1966*		at Idaho	W 80–66	5–1	
Dec 14, 1966*		at Cal Western	W 78–61	6–1	
Dec 15, 1966*		at Whitworth	W 76–62	7–1	
Dec 17, 1966*		at Eastern Montana	W 93–77	8–1	
Jan 2, 1967*		at Portland	W 79–67	9–1	
Jan 6, 1967		at Montana State	W 80–71	10–1	
Jan 7, 1967		at Montana	W 94–73	11–1	
Jan 11, 1967*		at Seattle Pacific	W 76–66	12–1	
Jan 14, 1967		at Idaho	L 61–64	12–2	
Jan 20, 1967*		at St. Martin’s	W 94–67	13–2	
Jan 21, 1967*		at Portland State	W 101–83	14–2	
Feb 2, 1967		at Idaho	W 67–62	15–2	
Feb 4, 1967*		at Washington State	L 64–69	15–3	
Feb 10, 1967		at Weber State	L 78–81	15–4	
Feb 11, 1967		at Idaho State	L 80–87	15–5	
Feb 17, 1967		at Montana	W 102–60	16–5	
Feb 18, 1967		at Montana State	W 69–52	17–5	
Feb 22, 1967*		at Portland State	L 80–91	17–6	
Feb 25, 1967*		at Portland	W 82–62	18–6	
Mar 3, 1967		at Weber State	W 71–67	19–6	
Mar 4, 1967		at Idaho State	W 96–81	20–6	
*Non-conference game. ^{#}Rankings from AP Poll. (#) Tournament seedings in parentheses.
