= Dagley =

Dagley is an English surname, a variant of Dadley. Notable people with the surname include:

- Norman Dagley (1930–1999), English billiards player
- Richard Dagley (c. 1761–1841), English painter and illustrator
- Sam Dagley (c. 1903–1968), American basketball player and coach
