= 1979–80 Arizona State Sun Devils men's basketball team =

American college basketball season

1979–80 Arizona State Sun Devils men's basketball

NCAA tournament, Second Round
- Conference: Pac-10 Conference

Ranking
- Coaches: No. 19
- AP: No. 18
- Record: 22–7 (15–3 Pac-10)
- Head coach: Ned Wulk (23rd season)
- Home arena: ASU Activity Center

1979–80 Pacific-10 Conference men's basketball standings
	Conf.				Overall
Team	W		L	PCT	W		L	PCT
^#5 Oregon State	16	–	2	.889	26	–	3	.897
No. 18 Arizona State	15	–	3	.833	22	–	7	.759
Washington State	14	–	4	.778	22	–	6	.786
*UCLA	12	–	6	.667	17	–	9	.654
Washington	9	–	9	.500	18	–	10	.643
Arizona	6	–	12	.333	12	–	15	.444
USC	5	–	13	.278	12	–	15	.444
Oregon	5	–	13	.278	10	–	17	.370
Stanford	5	–	13	.278	7	–	19	.269
California	3	–	15	.167	8	–	19	.296
As of April 15, 1980; *Oregon State vacated all tournament games (0–1) due to NCAA sanctions. Disputed record (16-2, 26-4)^UCLA vacated all tournament games (5–1) due to NCAA sanctions. Disputed record (22-10, 12-6); Rankings from AP Poll

The 1979–80 Arizona State Sun Devils men's basketball team represented the Arizona State University during the 1979–80 NCAA Division I men's basketball season. This was Ned Wulk's 23rd season as head coach. The Sun Devils defeated Loyola Marymount in the first round to advance to the Second Round. In the Second Round, they lost to the Ohio State, 75–89.

== Roster ==
1979–80 Arizona State Sun Devils men's basketball team
Players
Coaches

Pos.	#	Name	Height	Weight	Year	Hometown
G	12	Fat Lever	6 ft 2 in (1.88 m)	170 lb (77 kg)	So	Tucson, Arizona
C	53	Alton Lister	7 ft 0 in (2.13 m)	240 lb (109 kg)	So	Dallas, Texas
C	52	Kurt Nimphius	6 ft 10 in (2.08 m)	218 lb (99 kg)	Sr	Milwaukee, Wisconsin
G	11	Byron Scott	6 ft 5 in (1.96 m)	195 lb (88 kg)	Fr	Inglewood, California
F	30	Sam Williams	6 ft 8 in (2.03 m)	210 lb (95 kg)	Jr	Los Angeles, California

Head coach

- Ned Wulk

Assistant coach(es)

Legend

- (C) Team captain
- (S) Suspended
- (I) Ineligible
- (W) Walk-on
- Injured
- Current redshirt

== Schedule ==
Date time, TV	Rank^{#}	Opponent^{#}	Result	Record	Site city, state
December 3*		at Houston	W 78–65	1–0	Hofheinz Pavilion; Houston, Texas
December 7*		Southern Illinois	W 92–74	2–0	ASU Activity Center; Tempe, Arizona
December 8		USC	L 66–77	2–1	ASU Activity Center; Tempe, Arizona
December 12*		at Kansas State	L 50–63	2–2	Ahearn Field House; Manhattan, Kansas
December 14*		vs. Santa Clara	W 91–74	3–2	Stokely Center
December 15*		at Tennessee	L 79–82	3–3	Stokely Center
December 20		Washington State	W 75–74	4–3 (1–0)	ASU Activity Center; Tempe, Arizona
December 22		Washington	W 69–56	6–3 (2–0)	ASU Activity Center; Tempe, Arizona
December 27		Arizona	W 85–78	7–3 (3–0)	ASU Activity Center; Tempe, Arizona
December 29*		Kansas	W 73–65	8–3 (3–0)	ASU Activity Center; Tempe, Arizona
January 4		at Stanford	W 70–64	9–3 (4–0)	Maples Pavilion; Stanford, California
January 5		at California	W 74–63	10–3 (5–0)	Haas Pavilion; Berkeley, California
January 10		Oregon	W 104–77	11–3 (6–0)	ASU Activity Center; Tempe, Arizona
January 12		Oregon State	L 59–63	11–4 (6–1)	ASU Activity Center; Tempe, Arizona
January 17		at UCLA	W 78–76	12–4 (7–1)	Pauley Pavilion; Los Angeles, California
January 18		at USC	W 81–75	13–4 (8–1)	L.A. Sports Arena; Los Angeles, California
January 22*		Grand Canyon	W 80–68	14–4 (8–1)	ASU Activity Center; Tempe, Arizona
January 26		at Arizona	W 97–72	15–4 (9–1)	McKale Center; Tucson, Arizona
January 31		California	W 69–58	16–4 (10–1)	ASU Activity Center; Tempe, Arizona
February 2		Stanford	W 93–80	17–4 (11–1)	ASU Activity Center; Tempe, Arizona
February 7		at Oregon State	L 75–82	17–5 (11–2)	Gill Coliseum; Corvallis, Oregon
February 9		at Oregon	W 88–65	18–5 (12–2)	McArthur Court; Eugene, Oregon
February 16		USC	W 67–57	19–5 (13–2)	ASU Activity Center; Tempe, Arizona
February 18		UCLA	W 92–80	20–5 (14–2)	ASU Activity Center; Tempe, Arizona
February 23		Arizona	W 78–72	21–5 (15–2)	ASU Activity Center; Tempe, Arizona
February 28		at Washington State	L 58–71	20–6 (14–3)	Beasley Coliseum; Pullman, Washington
March 1		at Washington	W 75–61	21–6 (15–3)	Hec Edmundson Pavilion; Seattle, Washington
NCAA Tournament
March 7		vs. Loyola Marymount	W 99–71	22–6 (15–3)	ASU Activity Center; Tempe, Arizona
March 8		vs. Ohio State	L 75–89	22–7 (15–3)	ASU Activity Center; Tempe, Arizona
*Non-conference game. ^{#}Rankings from AP Poll. (#) Tournament seedings in parentheses.

== Awards and honors ==
- Byron Scott – Pac-10 Freshman of the Year
