= 1984–85 Gonzaga Bulldogs men's basketball team =

American college basketball season

1984–85 Gonzaga Bulldogs men's basketball
- Conference: West Coast Athletic Conference
- Record: 15–13 (4–8 WCAC)
- Head coach: Jay Hillock (4th season)
- Assistant coaches: Bruce Wilson; Joe Hillock
- Home arena: Kennedy Pavilion

1984–85 West Coast Athletic Conference men's basketball standings
	Conf.				Overall
Team	W		L	PCT	W		L	PCT
Pepperdine	11	–	1	.917	23	–	9	.719
Santa Clara	9	–	3	.750	20	–	9	.690
Saint Mary's	7	–	5	.583	15	–	12	.556
San Diego	5	–	7	.417	16	–	11	.593
Gonzaga	4	–	8	.333	15	–	13	.536
Portland	3	–	9	.250	14	–	14	.500
Loyola Marymount	3	–	9	.250	11	–	16	.407
Rankings from AP Poll

The 1984–85 Gonzaga Bulldogs men's basketball team represented Gonzaga University of Spokane, Washington, in the 1984–85 NCAA Division I men's basketball season. Led by fourth-year head coach Jay Hillock, the Bulldogs were 15–13 (.536) overall (4–8 in WCAC, 5th), and played their home games on campus at Kennedy Pavilion.

Following the season in early April, Hillock resigned and athletic director Dan Fitzgerald resumed his former role as head coach.
