= 1964–65 Weber State Wildcats men's basketball team =

American college basketball season

1964–65 Weber State Wildcats men's basketball

Big Sky Champions
- Conference: Big Sky Conference
- Record: 22–3 (8–2 Big Sky)
- Head coach: Dick Motta (5th season)
- Assistant coach: Phil Johnson
- Home arena: Wildcat Gym

1964–65 Big Sky men's basketball standings
	Conf.				Overall
Team	W		L	PCT	W		L	PCT
Weber State	8	–	2	.800	22	–	3	.880
Gonzaga	6	–	4	.600	18	–	8	.692
Montana State	6	–	4	.600	15	–	10	.600
Idaho	4	–	6	.400	6	–	19	.240
Idaho State	4	–	6	.400	7	–	19	.269
Montana	2	–	8	.200	11	–	15	.423

The 1964–65 Weber State Wildcats men's basketball team represented Weber State College during the 1964–65 NCAA University Division basketball season. In the second year of the Big Sky Conference, the Wildcats were led by fifth-year head coach Dick Motta and played their home games on campus at Wildcat Gym in Ogden, Utah. They were 22–3 overall and 8–2 in conference play.

Weber State won its first title; the conference did not yet have an automatic berth to the 23-team NCAA tournament, which came three years later.
