= 1965–66 Weber State Wildcats men's basketball team =

American college basketball season

1965–66 Weber State Wildcats men's basketball

Big Sky Co-champions
- Conference: Big Sky Conference
- Record: 20–5 (8–2 Big Sky)
- Head coach: Dick Motta (6th season)
- Assistant coach: Phil Johnson
- Home arena: Wildcat Gym

1965–66 Big Sky men's basketball standings
	Conf.				Overall
Team	W		L	PCT	W		L	PCT
Weber State	8	–	2	.800	20	–	5	.800
Gonzaga	8	–	2	.800	19	–	7	.731
Montana	6	–	5	.545	14	–	10	.583
Montana State	5	–	5	.500	7	–	15	.318
Idaho	2	–	8	.200	12	–	14	.462
Idaho State	1	–	9	.100	7	–	19	.269

The 1965–66 Weber State Wildcats men's basketball team represented Weber State College during the 1965–66 NCAA University Division basketball season. In the third season of the Big Sky Conference, the Wildcats were led by sixth-year head coach Dick Motta and played their home games on campus at Wildcat Gym in Ogden, Utah. They were 20–5 overall and 8–2 in conference play.

Weber State and Gonzaga were co-champions of the Big Sky; it did not yet have an automatic berth to the 22-team NCAA tournament, which came two years later. The conference tournament was a full decade away.
