= 1995 West Coast Conference men's basketball tournament =

- Classification: Division I
- Season: 1994–95
- Teams: 8
- Site: Toso Pavilion; Santa Clara, California
- Champions: Gonzaga (1st title)
- Winning coach: Dan Fitzgerald (1st title)
- MVP: John Rillie (Gonzaga)
- Top scorer: John Rillie (Gonzaga) (96 points)

1994–95 West Coast Conference men's basketball standings
	Conf.				Overall
Team	W		L	PCT	W		L	PCT
Santa Clara	12	–	2	.857	21	–	7	.750
Portland	10	–	4	.714	21	–	8	.724
Saint Mary's	10	–	4	.714	18	–	10	.643
Gonzaga †	7	–	7	.500	21	–	9	.700
San Diego	5	–	9	.357	11	–	16	.407
San Francisco	4	–	10	.286	10	–	19	.345
Pepperdine	4	–	10	.286	8	–	19	.296
Loyola Marymount	4	–	10	.286	13	–	15	.464
† Conference tournament winner Rankings from AP poll

The 1995 West Coast Conference men's basketball tournament took place on March 4–6, 1995. All rounds were held in Santa Clara, California at the Toso Pavilion.

The Gonzaga Bulldogs won the WCC Tournament title and an automatic bid to the 1995 NCAA tournament. John Rillie of Gonzaga was named Tournament MVP.

== Format ==
With eight teams participating, all eight teams were placed into the first round, with teams seeded and paired based on regular-season records. After the first round, teams were re-seeded so the highest-remaining team was paired with the lowest-remaining time in one semifinal with the other two teams slotted into the other semifinal.

== Bracket ==
Quarter finals Saturday, March 4
1	Santa Clara	83
8	Loyola Marymount	87
4	Gonzaga	74
5	San Diego	57
(Pairings are reseeded after the first round)
3	Saint Mary's	72
6	San Francisco	41
7	Pepperdine	52
2	Portland	62

Semi-finals; Sunday, March 5
2	Portland	74
8	Loyola Marymount	68
3	Saint Mary's	59
4	Gonzaga	69

Finals; Monday, March 6
2	Portland	67
4	Gonzaga	80
