= 1965–66 Gonzaga Bulldogs men's basketball team =

American college basketball season

1965–66 Gonzaga Bulldogs men's basketball

Big Sky Co-champions
- Conference: Big Sky Conference
- Record: 19–7 (8–2 Big Sky)
- Head coach: Hank Anderson (15th season)
- Home arena: Kennedy Pavilion

1965–66 Big Sky men's basketball standings
	Conf.				Overall
Team	W		L	PCT	W		L	PCT
Weber State	8	–	2	.800	20	–	5	.800
Gonzaga	8	–	2	.800	19	–	7	.731
Montana	6	–	5	.545	14	–	10	.583
Montana State	5	–	5	.500	7	–	15	.318
Idaho	2	–	8	.200	12	–	14	.462
Idaho State	1	–	9	.100	7	–	19	.269

The 1965–66 Gonzaga Bulldogs men's basketball team represented Gonzaga University during the 1965–66 NCAA University Division men's basketball season. In the third season of the Big Sky Conference, the Bulldogs were led by fifteenth-year head coach Hank Anderson and played their home games on campus at the new Kennedy Pavilion in Spokane, Washington. They were 19–7 overall and 8–2 in conference play.

Gonzaga and Weber State were co-champions of the Big Sky; it did not yet have an automatic berth to the 22-team NCAA tournament, which came two years later.

== Schedule ==
Date time, TV	Rank^{#}	Opponent^{#}	Result	Record	Site city, state
Nov 28, 1965*		Portland State	W 71–53	1–0	Spokane Coliseum
Dec 5, 1965*		at Washington State	W 72–71	2–0	
Dec 11, 1965*		at Pepperdine	W 93–70	3–0	
Dec 12, 1965*		at Portland	L 69–80	3–1	
Dec 14, 1965*		Whitworth	W 69–67	4–1	Spokane Coliseum
Dec 16, 1965*		Washington State	W 54–49	5–1	Spokane Coliseum
Dec 19, 1965*		at Eastern Montana	W 75–63	6–1	
Dec 21, 1965*		at Toledo	L 81–86	6–2	
Dec 22, 1965*		at Duquesne	L 69–83	6–3	
Dec 27, 1965*		at Seattle University	L 87–111	6–4	
Dec 29, 1965*		at British Columbia	W 55–53	7–4	
Dec 30, 1965*		at British Columbia	W 65–51	8–4	
Jan 6, 1966*		at Portland	W 90–81	9–4	
Jan 14, 1966		Montana	W 91–79	10–4	Spokane Coliseum
Jan 16, 1966		Montana State	W 77–69	11–4	Spokane Coliseum
Jan 18, 1966*		at Whitworth	W 65–60	12–4	
Jan 30, 1966		at Montana	L 82–83	12–5	
Feb 3, 1966*		Eastern Washington	W 83–69	13–5	Spokane Coliseum
Feb 6, 1966		at Montana State	W 67–57	14–5	
Feb 12, 1966		at Idaho	L 65–86	14–6	
Feb 17, 1966		Idaho	W 67–61	15–6	Spokane Coliseum
Feb 21, 1966*		St. Martin’s	W 83–67	16–6	Spokane Coliseum
Feb 27, 1966		Idaho State	W 74–53	17–6	Spokane Coliseum
Mar 1, 1966		Weber State	W 77–68	18–6	Spokane Coliseum
Mar 5, 1966		at Weber State	L 67–86	18–7	
Mar 6, 1966		at Idaho State	L 97–101	18–8	
Feb 25, 1966		at Montana	W 82–81	19–8	
Feb 26, 1966		at Montana State	L 74–75	19–9	
Mar 6, 1966*		at Portland	W 81–78	20–9	
*Non-conference game. ^{#}Rankings from AP Poll. (#) Tournament seedings in parentheses.
