= 1966–67 Idaho Vandals men's basketball team =

American college basketball season

1966–67 Idaho Vandals men's basketball
- Conference: Big Sky Conference
- Record: 15–12 (5–5 Big Sky)
- Head coach: Wayne Anderson (1st season)
- Assistant coach: John G. Smith
- MVPs: Bob Pipkin; Dave Schlotthauer
- Home arena: Memorial Gymnasium

1966–67 Big Sky men's basketball standings
	Conf.				Overall
Team	W		L	PCT	W		L	PCT
Gonzaga	7	–	3	.700	21	–	6	.778
Montana State	7	–	3	.700	15	–	11	.577
Weber State	5	–	5	.500	18	–	7	.720
Idaho	5	–	5	.500	15	–	12	.556
Idaho State	5	–	5	.500	11	–	16	.407
Montana	1	–	9	.100	7	–	17	.292

The 1966–67 Idaho Vandals men's basketball team represented the University of Idaho during the 1966–67 NCAA University Division basketball season. Charter members of the Big Sky Conference, the Vandals were led by first-year head coach Wayne Anderson and played their home games on campus at the Memorial Gymnasium in Moscow, Idaho. They were 15–12 overall and 5–5 in conference play.

Alumnus Anderson had been an assistant (and head baseball coach) for nine years at Idaho. He was promoted in September 1966, stepped down as baseball coach, and led the basketball program for eight years.
