= 1979–80 Gonzaga Bulldogs men's basketball team =

American college basketball season

1979–80 Gonzaga Bulldogs men's basketball
- Conference: West Coast Athletic Conference
- Record: 13–13 (8–8 WCAC)
- Head coach: Dan Fitzgerald (2nd season)
- Assistant coach: Jay Hillock
- Home arena: Kennedy Pavilion; Spokane Coliseum

1979–80 West Coast Athletic Conference men's basketball standings
	Conf.				Overall
Team	W		L	PCT	W		L	PCT
San Francisco	11	–	5	.688	22	–	7	.759
Loyola Marymount	10	–	6	.625	14	–	14	.500
Pepperdine	9	–	7	.563	17	–	10	.630
Portland	9	–	7	.563	17	–	11	.607
Saint Mary's	9	–	7	.563	13	–	14	.481
Gonzaga	8	–	8	.500	13	–	13	.500
Santa Clara	8	–	8	.500	13	–	14	.481
Seattle	7	–	9	.438	11	–	16	.407
San Diego	1	–	15	.063	5	–	20	.200
Rankings from AP Poll

The 1979–80 Gonzaga Bulldogs men's basketball team represented Gonzaga University in the 1979–80 NCAA Division I men's basketball season. Led by second-year head coach Dan Fitzgerald, the Bulldogs were 13–13 (.500) overall (8–8 in WCAC, 6th), and played their home games on campus at Kennedy Pavilion and off campus at the Spokane Coliseum, both in Spokane, Washington.

This was Gonzaga's first season in the West Coast Athletic Conference (WCAC), shortened to WCC a decade later; its conference tournament debuted in 1987.
