= 1994–95 Gonzaga Bulldogs men's basketball team =

American college basketball season

1994–95 Gonzaga Bulldogs men's basketball

WCC tournament champions

NCAA tournament, first round
- Conference: West Coast Conference
- Record: 21–9 (7–7 WCC)
- Head coach: Dan Fitzgerald (13th season)
- Assistant coaches: Dan Monson (7th season); Mark Few (6th season); Bill Grier (4th season)
- Home arena: Charlotte Y. Martin Centre

1994–95 West Coast Conference men's basketball standings
	Conf.				Overall
Team	W		L	PCT	W		L	PCT
Santa Clara	12	–	2	.857	21	–	7	.750
Portland	10	–	4	.714	21	–	8	.724
Saint Mary's	10	–	4	.714	18	–	10	.643
Gonzaga †	7	–	7	.500	21	–	9	.700
San Diego	5	–	9	.357	11	–	16	.407
San Francisco	4	–	10	.286	10	–	19	.345
Pepperdine	4	–	10	.286	8	–	19	.296
Loyola Marymount	4	–	10	.286	13	–	15	.464
† Conference tournament winner Rankings from AP poll

The 1994–95 Gonzaga Bulldogs men's basketball team represented Gonzaga University in the West Coast Conference (WCC) during the 1994–95 NCAA Division I men's basketball season. Led by thirteenth-year head coach Dan Fitzgerald, the Bulldogs were 18–8 (.692) overall in the regular season (7–7 in WCC, fourth), and played their home games on campus at the Charlotte Y. Martin Centre in Spokane, Washington.

The Bulldogs opened the season with just one loss in twelve non-conference games, but dropped their first six games in conference. In the next eight WCC games, they lost only once, and finished fourth in the standings.

Gonzaga advanced to the final of the WCC tournament at Santa Clara, and defeated second-seed Portland to secure their first-ever appearance in the NCAA tournament.

Ten days later in the West regional, the Bulldogs lost to tenth-ranked Maryland in Salt Lake City to finish at 21–9 (.700). Their next appearance in the tournament came four years later.

== Postseason results ==
Date time, TV	Rank^{#}	Opponent^{#}	Result	Record	Site (attendance) city, state
WCC Tournament
Sat, March 4; 8:00 pm	(4)	vs. (5) San Diego; Quarterfinal	W 74–57	19–8	Toso Pavilion; Santa Clara, California
Sun, March 5; 8:00 pm, PSN	(4)	vs. (3) Saint Mary's; Semifinal	W 69–59	20–8	Toso Pavilion (3,112); Santa Clara, California
Mon, March 6; 9:00 pm, ESPN	(4)	vs. (2) Portland; Final	W 80–67	21–8	Toso Pavilion (2,722); Santa Clara, California
NCAA tournament
Thu, March 16; 7:30 pm, CBS	(14W)	vs. (3W) No. 10 Maryland; First round	L 63–87	21–9	Huntsman Center (12,369); Salt Lake City, Utah
*Non-conference game. ^{#}Rankings from AP poll. (#) Tournament seedings in parentheses. W=West. All times are in Pacific time.
