= 1968–69 Gonzaga Bulldogs men's basketball team =

American college basketball season

1968–69 Gonzaga Bulldogs men's basketball
- Conference: Big Sky Conference
- Record: 11–15 (6–9 Big Sky)
- Head coach: Hank Anderson (18th season)
- Home arena: Kennedy Pavilion

1968–69 Big Sky men's basketball standings
	Conf.				Overall
Team	W		L	PCT	W		L	PCT
Weber State	15	–	0	1.000	27	–	3	.900
Montana State	11	–	4	.733	17	–	8	.680
Gonzaga	6	–	9	.400	11	–	15	.423
Idaho	6	–	9	.400	11	–	15	.423
Montana	4	–	11	.267	9	–	17	.346
Idaho State	3	–	12	.200	8	–	18	.308

The 1968–69 Gonzaga Bulldogs men's basketball team represented Gonzaga University during the 1968–69 NCAA University Division basketball season. In the sixth season of the Big Sky Conference, the Bulldogs were led by eighteenth-year head coach Hank Anderson and played their home games on campus at Kennedy Pavilion in Spokane, Washington. They were 11–15 overall and 6–9 in conference play.

== Schedule ==
Date time, TV	Rank^{#}	Opponent^{#}	Result	Record	Site city, state
Dec 3, 1968*		at Washington State	L 64–91	0–1	
Dec 7, 1968*		at Seattle Pacific	L 65–84	0–2	
Dec 13, 1968*		at South Dakota	W 79–60	1–2	
Dec 14, 1968*		at Whitworth	L 69–78	1–3	
Dec 21, 1968*		at St. Martin’s	W 83–69	2–3	
Dec 23, 1968*		at Santa Clara	L 62–86	2–4	
Jan 2, 1969*		at Portland	W 53–49	3–4	
Jan 3, 1969*		at Portland State	L 78–103	3–5	
Jan 10, 1969		at Montana State	L 67–77	3–6	
Jan 11, 1969		at Montana State	L 75–77	3–7	
Jan 13, 1969		at Montana	W 87–69	4–7	
Jan 18, 1969*		at Eastern Montana	W 80–64	5–7	
Jan 28, 1969		at Idaho	W 71–60	6–7	
Feb 1, 1969*		at Washington State	L 61–85	6–8	
Feb 7, 1969		at Idaho State	W 109–87	7–8	
Feb 8, 1969		at Idaho State	W 85–74	8–8	
Feb 10, 1969		at Weber State	L 80–83	8–9	
Feb 14, 1969		at Weber State	L 67–83	8–10	
Feb 15, 1969		at Weber State	L 73–91	8–11	
Feb 17, 1969		at Idaho State	W 85–81	9–11	
Feb 21, 1969		at Montana	W 71–68	10–11	
Feb 22, 1969		at Montana	L 74–76	10–12	
Feb 24, 1969		at Montana State	L 66–87	10–13	
Mar 1, 1969*		at Portland	W 100–79	11–13	
Mar 7, 1969		at Idaho	L 62–65	11–14	
Mar 8, 1969		at Idaho	L 69–82	11–15	
*Non-conference game. ^{#}Rankings from AP Poll. (#) Tournament seedings in parentheses.
