= Ned Wulk =

American basketball and baseball coach (1920–2003)

Biographical details
- Born: August 14, 1920; Marion, Wisconsin, U.S.
- Died: November 15, 2003 (aged 83); Tempe, Arizona, U.S.

Playing career

Football
- (2 yrs.): La Crosse State

Basketball
- 1938–1942: La Crosse State

Baseball
- (3 yrs.): La Crosse State

Coaching career (HC unless noted)

Football
- 1948–1956: Xavier (assistant)

Basketball
- 1948–1951: Xavier (assistant)
- 1951–1957: Xavier
- 1957–1982: Arizona State

Baseball
- 1949–1956: Xavier

Head coaching record
- Overall: 495–342 (basketball); 61–39–1 (baseball)
- Tournaments: Basketball; 8–10 (NCAA University Division / Division I); 2–2 (NIT)

Accomplishments and honors

Championships
- Basketball; 4 Border regular season (1958, 1959, 1961, 1962); 4 WAC regular season (1963, 1964, 1973, 1975)

Awards
- Basketball; Pac-10 Coach of the Year (1980)

Ned W. Wulk (August 14, 1920 – November 15, 2003) was an American basketball and baseball coach. He served as the head men's basketball coach at Arizona State University from 1958 to 1982, compiling a record of 406–272. His 406 wins are the most of any head coach history of the Arizona State Sun Devils men's basketball program. Wells Fargo Arena's basketball court was named after him in 1999. At the time of his 400th victory, he was one of only four active coaches to win 400 or more games at one school. He led Arizona State to 17 winning seasons in his 25 years and a record of 39–15 against rival Arizona.

== Early life and career ==
Wulk graduated from the La Crosse State Teachers College (now UW La Crosse) in 1942. There, he lettered in football, basketball, and baseball. After working as a high school physical education teacher for several years, he was hired by Xavier University in fall 1948 to serve as an assistant football coach, assistant basketball coach, and head baseball coach. He was promoted to head basketball coach after three seasons as an assistant.

== Arizona State ==
Under Wulk, Arizona State reached 9 NCAA tournaments, and 3 Elite Eight appearances in 1961, 1963, and 1975. In the 1963 NCAA tournament at Provo, the Sun Devils routed UCLA in a second-round game, 93–79. The Bruins were on the brink of back-to-back national titles in ‘64 and ‘65. And in 1981, Wulk's ASU Sun Devils went to Corvallis on the final day of the regular season and defeated #1 ranked Oregon State by a score of 87–67. Wulk's 1963 team still has the school record for most wins in a season at 26. In the previous season, he set the ASU school record for longest winning streak at 18 games. He led the 1981 ASU Sun Devils of the Pac-10 to the highest national ranking in school history at #3, finishing with a record of 24–4. He was selected as the Pac-10 Coach of the Year in 1980, when ASU finished 21–6, including 15–3 in conference play. He was fired in 1982 after one mediocre season.

Wulk was inducted into the Pac-10 Hall of Fame in 2003.

== Head coaching record ==
=== Basketball ===
Record table
Season	Team	Overall	Conference	Standing	Postseason
Xavier Musketeers (NCAA University Division independent) (1951–1957)
1951–52	Xavier	10–14			
1952–53	Xavier	11–12			
1953–54	Xavier	18–12			
1954–55	Xavier	13–13			
1955–56	Xavier	17–11			NIT quarterfinal
1956–57	Xavier	20–8			NIT quarterfinal
Xavier:		89–70			
Arizona State Sun Devils (Border Conference) (1957–1962)
1957–58	Arizona State	13–13	8–2	1st	NCAA University Division first round
1958–59	Arizona State	17–9	7–3	T–1st	
1959–60	Arizona State	16–7	7–3	T–2nd	
1960–61	Arizona State	23–6	9–1	T–1st	NCAA University Division Elite Eight
1961–62	Arizona State	23–4	10–0	1st	NCAA University Division first round
Arizona State Sun Devils (Western Athletic Conference) (1962–1978)
1962–63	Arizona State	26–3	9–1	1st	NCAA University Division Elite Eight
1963–64	Arizona State	16–11	7–3	T–1st	NCAA University Division first round
1964–65	Arizona State	13–14	4–6	5th	
1965–66	Arizona State	12–14	3–7	6th	
1966–67	Arizona State	5–21	1–9	6th	
1967–68	Arizona State	11–17	4–6	T–4th	
1968–69	Arizona State	11–15	4–6	T–5th	
1969–70	Arizona State	4–22	2–12	8th	
1970–71	Arizona State	16–10	8–6	4th	
1971–72	Arizona State	18–8	9–5	T–2nd	
1972–73	Arizona State	19–9	10–4	1st	NCAA University Division Regional Fourth Place
1973–74	Arizona State	18–9	9–5	T–2nd	
1974–75	Arizona State	25–4	12–2	1st	NCAA Division I Elite Eight
1975–76	Arizona State	17–10	5–9	7th	
1976–77	Arizona State	15–13	6–8	T–5th	
1977–78	Arizona State	13–14	6–8	T–4th	
Arizona State Sun Devils (Pacific-10 Conference) (1978–1982)
1978–79	Arizona State	16–14	7–11	T–6th	
1979–80	Arizona State	22–7	15–3	2nd	NCAA Division I second round
1980–81	Arizona State	24–4	16–2	2nd	NCAA Division I second round
1981–82	Arizona State	13–14	8–10	T–6th	
Arizona State:		406–272	186–132		
Total:		495–342			
National champion Postseason invitational champion Conference regular season champion Conference regular season and conference tournament champion Division regular season champion Division regular season and conference tournament champion Conference tournament champion

=== Baseball ===
Wulk spent eight seasons as Xavier's baseball coach.

Record table
Season	Team	Overall	Conference	Standing	Postseason
Xavier Musketeers (Independent) (1949–1956)
1949	Xavier	7–5			
1950	Xavier	6–6			
1951	Xavier	12–4			
1952	Xavier	6–5			
1953	Xavier	6–4			
1954	Xavier	10–2–1			
1955	Xavier	8–4			
1956	Xavier	6–9			
Xavier:		61–39–1			
Total:		61–39–1			
