= 1968–69 Idaho Vandals men's basketball team =

American college basketball season

1968–69 Idaho Vandals men's basketball
- Conference: Big Sky Conference
- Record: 11–15 (6–9 Big Sky)
- Head coach: Wayne Anderson (3rd season)
- Assistant coaches: Dale James (1st season); John G. Smith
- MVP: Jerry Smith & Jim Thacker
- Home arena: Memorial Gymnasium

1968–69 Big Sky men's basketball standings
	Conf.				Overall
Team	W		L	PCT	W		L	PCT
Weber State	15	–	0	1.000	27	–	3	.900
Montana State	11	–	4	.733	17	–	8	.680
Gonzaga	6	–	9	.400	11	–	15	.423
Idaho	6	–	9	.400	11	–	15	.423
Montana	4	–	11	.267	9	–	17	.346
Idaho State	3	–	12	.200	8	–	18	.308

The 1968–69 Idaho Vandals men's basketball team represented the University of Idaho during the 1968–69 NCAA University Division basketball season. Charter members of the Big Sky Conference, the Vandals were led by third-year head coach Wayne Anderson and played their home games on campus at the Memorial Gymnasium in Moscow, Idaho.

Expected to contend for the Big Sky title, they were 11–15 overall (6–9 in Big Sky, third), ending with five wins in their final seven games.
