= 1963–64 Idaho Vandals men's basketball team =

American college basketball season

1963–64 Idaho Vandals men's basketball
- Conference: Big Sky Conference
- Record: 7–19 (4–6 Big Sky)
- Head coach: Jim Goddard (1st season)
- Assistant coach: Wayne Anderson
- MVP: Tom Moreland
- Home arena: Memorial Gymnasium

1963–64 Big Sky men's basketball standings
| | Conf. | | | | Overall |
| Team | W | | L | PCT | W | | L | PCT |
|---|---|---|---|---|---|---|---|---|
| Montana State | 8 | – | 2 | .800 | 16 | – | 9 | .640 |
| Weber State | 7 | – | 3 | .700 | 17 | – | 8 | .680 |
| Idaho State | 5 | – | 5 | .500 | 10 | – | 15 | .400 |
| Gonzaga | 5 | – | 5 | .500 | 11 | – | 13 | .458 |
| Idaho | 4 | – | 6 | .400 | 7 | – | 19 | .269 |
| Montana | 1 | – | 9 | .100 | 6 | – | 17 | .261 |

The 1963–64 Idaho Vandals men's basketball team represented the University of Idaho during the 1963–64 NCAA University Division basketball season. In the inaugural year of the Big Sky Conference, the Vandals were led by first-year head coach Jim Goddard and played their home games on campus at the Memorial Gymnasium in Moscow, Idaho. They were 7–19 overall and 4–6 in conference play.

== See also ==
- 1963–64 NCAA University Division men's basketball season
- 1963 in sports
