= 1994–95 Santa Clara Broncos men's basketball team =

American college basketball season

1994–95 Santa Clara Broncos men's basketball

WCC regular season champions

NCAA Tournament, first round
- Conference: West Coast Conference
- Record: 21–7 (12–2 WCC)
- Head coach: Dick Davey (3rd season)
- Assistant coaches: Larry Hauser; Steve Seandel
- Home arena: Toso Pavilion

1994–95 West Coast Conference men's basketball standings
	Conf.				Overall
Team	W		L	PCT	W		L	PCT
Santa Clara	12	–	2	.857	21	–	7	.750
Portland	10	–	4	.714	21	–	8	.724
Saint Mary's	10	–	4	.714	18	–	10	.643
Gonzaga †	7	–	7	.500	21	–	9	.700
San Diego	5	–	9	.357	11	–	16	.407
San Francisco	4	–	10	.286	10	–	19	.345
Pepperdine	4	–	10	.286	8	–	19	.296
Loyola Marymount	4	–	10	.286	13	–	15	.464
† Conference tournament winner Rankings from AP poll

The 1994–95 Santa Clara Broncos men's basketball team represented Santa Clara University in the 1994-95 Season. Led by head coach Dick Davey, the Broncos finished with a record of 21–7, and a WCC record of 12–2, placing first in the West Coast Conference. After losing in the first round of the West coast Conference tournament to Loyola Marymount, the school received an at-large bid into the NCAA tournament, where they were beaten by Mississippi State in the first round. Throughout the season, Canadian point guard Steve Nash was a standout performer for the Broncos, winning the WCC Player of the Year. Following the season, Nash would contemplate entering the NBA draft, but elected to return for his senior season.

== Roster ==
1994–95 Santa Clara Broncos men's basketball team
Players
Coaches

Pos.	#	Name	Height	Weight	Year	Previous school	Hometown
G	3	Phil Doherty	—	—
G	11	Steve Nash	6 ft 3 in (1.91 m)	175 lb (79 kg)	Jr	St. Michaels	Victoria, BC
G/F	12	Adam Anderson	6 ft 5 in (1.96 m)	—	Jr
G	21	Lloyd Pierce	6 ft 3 in (1.91 m)	—	Fr	Yerba Buena	San Jose, California
G	24	Marlon Garnett	6 ft 2 in (1.88 m)	180 lb (82 kg)	So	Hamilton	Los Angeles, California
F	30	Jason Sedlock	6 ft 7 in (2.01 m)	—	Jr
C	31	Drew Zurek	6 ft 9 in (2.06 m)	—	So
C	33	Phil Von Buchwaldt	6 ft 11 in (2.11 m)	—	Jr
F	34	Kevin Dunne	6 ft 6 in (1.98 m)	—	Jr
C	42	Brendan Graves	6 ft 10 in (2.08 m)	—	Jr

Head coach

- Dick Davey (Pacific)

Assistant coach(es)

- Larry Hauser (Chicago State)
- Steve Seandel (San José State)

Legend

- (C) Team captain
- (S) Suspended
- (I) Ineligible
- (W) Walk-on
- Injured
- Current redshirt

== Schedule and results ==
Date time, TV	Rank^{#}	Opponent^{#}	Result	Record	High points	High rebounds	High assists	Site city, state
Regular Season
Nov 29, 1994*		at Pacific	W 74–72 ^{OT}	1–0	–	–	–	Alex G. Spanos Center; Stockton, California
Dec 2, 1994*		vs. Cal State Fullerton; Coors Lite Classic	W 79–65	2–0	–	–	12 – Nash	Selland Arena; Fresno, California
Dec 3, 1994*		at Fresno State; Coors Lite Classic	W 81–57	3–0	–	–	–	Selland Arena; Fresno, California
Dec 10, 1994*		at Oregon State	L 78–85	3–1	–	–	–	Gill Coliseum; Corvallis, Oregon
Dec 10, 1994*		Oregon	W 88–83	4–1	34 – Nash	–	–	Toso Pavilion; Santa Clara, California
Dec 16, 1994*		vs. Georgia Southern; UAB Classic	W 86–66	5–1	–	–	–	BJCC Coliseum; Birmingham, Alabama
Dec 17, 1994*		at UAB; UAB Classic	W 80–65	6–1	–	–	–	BJCC Coliseum; Birmingham, Alabama
Dec 20, 1994*		at No. 7 Kansas	L 75–80	6–2	26 – Garnett	–	–	Allen Fieldhouse; Lawrence, Kansas
Dec 22, 1994*		Illinois State	W 80–63	7–2	–	–	–	Toso Pavilion; Santa Clara, California
Dec 28, 1994*		vs. Alaska Anchorage; Cable Car Classic	W 78–75	8–2	–	–	–	San Jose Arena; San Jose, California
Dec 29, 1994*		vs. BYU; Cable Car Classic	L 55–76	8–3	–	–	–	San Jose Arena; San Jose, California
Jan 7, 1995		Saint Mary's	W 75–71	9–3 (1–0)	34 – Nash	–	–	Toso Pavilion; Santa Clara, California
Jan 13, 1995		Pepperdine	W 67–50	10–3 (2–0)	–	–	–	Toso Pavilion; Santa Clara, California
Jan 14, 1995		Loyola Marymount	W 83–70	11–3 (3–0)	–	–	–	Toso Pavilion; Santa Clara, California
Jan 19, 1995		at Gonzaga	W 73–68 ^{OT}	12–3 (4–0)	40 – Nash	–	–	The Kennel; Spokane, Washington
Jan 21, 1995		at Portland	L 49–72	12–4 (4–1)	–	–	–	Chiles Center; Portland, Oregon
Jan 27, 1995		Portland	W 85–58	13–4 (5–1)	–	–	–	Toso Pavilion; Santa Clara, California
Jan 28, 1995		Gonzaga	W 83–74	14–4 (6–1)	–	–	–	Toso Pavilion; Santa Clara, California
Feb 2, 1995		at San Diego	W 89–64	15–4 (7–1)	–	–	–	USD Sports Arena; San Diego, California
Feb 4, 1995		at San Francisco	W 80–63	16–4 (8–1)	–	–	–	War Memorial Gymnasium; San Francisco, California
Feb 7, 1995*		Cal State Sacramento	W 82–53	17–4	–	–	–	Toso Pavilion; Santa Clara, California
Feb 10, 1995		San Francisco	W 82–62	18–4 (9–1)	–	–	–	Toso Pavilion; Santa Clara, California
Feb 12, 1995		San Diego	W 74–62	19–4 (10–1)	–	–	–	Toso Pavilion; Santa Clara, California
Feb 18, 1995		at Saint Mary's	W 77–62	20–4 (11–1)	–	–	–	McKeon Pavilion; Moraga, California
Feb 24, 1995		at Loyola Marymount	W 74–69	21–4 (12–1)	20 – Garnett	–	–	Gersten Pavilion; Los Angeles, California
Feb 25, 1995		at Pepperdine	L 63–73	21–5 (12–2)	30 – Nash	–	–	Firestone Fieldhouse; Malibu, California
WCC Tournament
Mar 4, 1995*	(1)	(8) Loyola Marymount; Quarterfinals	L 83–87	21–6	20 – Nash	–	–	Toso Pavilion; Santa Clara, California
NCAA Tournament
Mar 17, 1995*	(12 W)	vs. (5 W) No. 18 Mississippi State	L 67–75	21–7	22 – Nash	7 – Nash	2 – Tied	Taco Bell Arena; Boise, Idaho
*Non-conference game. ^{#}Rankings from AP Poll. (#) Tournament seedings in parentheses. W=West. All times are in Pacific Time.

== Awards and honors ==
- Steve Nash – WCC Player of the Year
