= 1966–67 Weber State Wildcats men's basketball team =

American college basketball season

1966–67 Weber State Wildcats men's basketball
- Conference: Big Sky Conference
- Record: 18–7 (5–5 Big Sky)
- Head coach: Dick Motta (7th season)
- Assistant coach: Phil Johnson
- Home arena: Wildcat Gym

1966–67 Big Sky men's basketball standings
	Conf.				Overall
Team	W		L	PCT	W		L	PCT
Gonzaga	7	–	3	.700	21	–	6	.778
Montana State	7	–	3	.700	15	–	11	.577
Weber State	5	–	5	.500	18	–	7	.720
Idaho	5	–	5	.500	15	–	12	.556
Idaho State	5	–	5	.500	11	–	16	.407
Montana	1	–	9	.100	7	–	17	.292

The 1966–67 Weber State Wildcats men's basketball team represented Weber State College during the 1966–67 NCAA University Division basketball season. Members of the Big Sky Conference, the Wildcats were led by seventh-year head coach Dick Motta and played their home games on campus at Wildcat Gym in Ogden, Utah. They were 18–7 in the regular season and 5–5 in conference play.

This was the final season in which the Big Sky was excluded from the NCAA tournament. Weber State was the conference champion (regular season) for the next six years, with an automatic bid; the conference tournament debuted in March 1976.
