= Dadley (surname) =

Dadley is an English surname, a variant of Dudley. Notable people with the surname include:

- Jas Dadley (1898–1962), English footballer
