= 1963–64 Weber State Wildcats men's basketball team =

American college basketball season

1963–64 Weber State Wildcats men's basketball
- Conference: Big Sky Conference
- Record: 22–3 (8–2 Big Sky)
- Head coach: Dick Motta (4th season)
- Home arena: Wildcat Gym

1963–64 Big Sky men's basketball standings
	Conf.				Overall
Team	W		L	PCT	W		L	PCT
Montana State	8	–	2	.800	16	–	9	.640
Weber State	7	–	3	.700	17	–	8	.680
Idaho State	5	–	5	.500	10	–	15	.400
Gonzaga	5	–	5	.500	11	–	13	.458
Idaho	4	–	6	.400	7	–	19	.269
Montana	1	–	9	.100	6	–	17	.261

The 1963–64 Weber State Wildcats men's basketball team represented Weber State College during the 1963–64 NCAA University Division basketball season. In the inaugural year of the Big Sky Conference, the Wildcats were led by fourth-year head coach Dick Motta and played their home games on campus at Wildcat Gym in Ogden, Utah. They were 17–8 overall and 7–3 in conference play.
