= 1965–66 Idaho Vandals men's basketball team =

American college basketball season

1965–66 Idaho Vandals men's basketball
- Conference: Big Sky Conference
- Record: 12–14 (2–8 Big Sky)
- Head coach: Jim Goddard (3rd season)
- Assistant coach: Wayne Anderson
- Home arena: Memorial Gymnasium

1965–66 Big Sky men's basketball standings
	Conf.				Overall
Team	W		L	PCT	W		L	PCT
Weber State	8	–	2	.800	20	–	5	.800
Gonzaga	8	–	2	.800	19	–	7	.731
Montana	6	–	5	.545	14	–	10	.583
Montana State	5	–	5	.500	7	–	15	.318
Idaho	2	–	8	.200	12	–	14	.462
Idaho State	1	–	9	.100	7	–	19	.269

The 1965–66 Idaho Vandals men's basketball team represented the University of Idaho during the 1965–66 NCAA University Division basketball season. Charter members of the Big Sky Conference, the Vandals were led by third-year head coach Jim Goddard and played their home games on campus at the Memorial Gymnasium in Moscow, Idaho. They were 12–14 overall and 2–8 in conference play.

Goddard unexpectedly resigned in August 1966 for an administrative position at the Oregon department of education in Salem. He was succeeded by alumnus Wayne Anderson, a longtime assistant and head baseball coach.
