= Arizona State Sun Devils men's basketball =

2026–27 Arizona State Sun Devils men's basketball team
- University: Arizona State University
- First season: 1911–12; 115 years ago
- Athletic director: Graham Rossini
- Head coach: Randy Bennett (1st season)
- Location: Tempe, Arizona
- Arena: Desert Financial Arena (capacity: 14,100)
- NCAA division: Division I
- Conference: Big 12
- Nickname: Sun Devils
- Colors: Maroon and gold
- Student section: 942 Crew
- All-time record: 1,498–1,347 (.527)
- NCAA tournament record: 15–18 (.455)

NCAA Division I tournament Elite Eight
- 1961, 1963, 1975
Other NCAA Division I tournament results
Sweet Sixteen	1961, 1963, 1973, 1975, 1995*
Appearances	1958, 1961, 1962, 1963, 1964, 1973, 1975, 1980, 1981, 1991, 1995*, 2003, 2009, 2014, 2018, 2019, 2023

Conference regular-season champions
- Border: 1958, 1959, 1961, 1962 WAC: 1963, 1964, 1973, 1975

Uniforms
Home	Away	Alternate
- * vacated by NCAA

The Arizona State Sun Devils men's basketball team is the basketball team that represents Arizona State University in Tempe, Arizona, United States. The school's team competes in the Big 12 Conference.

The Arizona State Sun Devils have appeared in the NCAA tournament 17 times, including 3 Elite Eights (1961, 1963, 1975). They have won eight conference championships (four WAC, and four Border Conference) and finished in the final AP rankings seven times. The highest national ranking the Sun Devils have achieved is AP No. 3 under Bobby Hurley during the 2017–18 season and No. 3 under Ned Wulk during the 1980–81 season when the starting lineup included future NBA stars Byron Scott, Fat Lever, and Alton Lister.

38 ASU Sun Devils have been selected in the NBA draft, including eleven-time NBA All-Star James Harden, Byron Scott, Isaac Austin, Lafayette Lever, Alton Lister, Lionel Hollins, Sam Williams, Jeff Pendergraph, Mario Bennett, Tommy Smith, Ike Diogu, Eddie House, Freddie Lewis, and Joe Caldwell.

== History ==
=== Bobby Hurley era ===
Arizona State was led by head coach Bobby Hurley (eleven seasons), who replaced Herb Sendek. Sendek was credited for bringing a "basketball atmosphere" and level of excitement to Arizona State that had been absent for years. In his first four seasons at Arizona State, Sendek led the Sun Devils to three consecutive 20 win seasons, the 2009 Pac-10 conference tournament finals, and the second round of the 2009 NCAA tournament and 2014 NCAA tournament. Hurley, in turn, took the Sun Devils to the 2018, 2019, and 2023 NCAA Tournaments. During his 11 seasons in Tempe, Hurley secured 15 victories over ranked teams, including 9 wins over top 15 teams.

The Sun Devils earned a 3-seed and first-round bye in the Pac-12 Conference men's basketball tournament and were scheduled to play Washington State when the tournament was canceled due to the COVID-19 pandemic. The 2020 NCAA Division I men's basketball tournament was also canceled due to the pandemic. While the NCAA did not release seedings for the canceled tournament, the Sun Devils were projected by ESPN's Joe Lunardi in his end-of-season "Bracketology" to be a 9-seed. This would have been the first time since 1964 that the Sun Devils had made the tournament in three straight years.

== Record vs. Pac-12 opponents ==
Arizona State has these all-time series records vs. Pac-12 opponents as of March 2026. The Sun Devils lead three of the series. (note: the results include non-conference matchups).

Opponent	Wins	Losses	Pct.	Streak
Arizona	86	165	(.343)	ARIZ 7
Cal	51	43	(.543)	CAL 2
Colorado	14	18	(.438)	COL 2
Oregon	47	49	(.490)	ORE 2
Oregon St.	55	46	(.545)	OSU 1
Stanford	44	54	(.449)	STAN 1
UCLA	24	77	(.238)	UCLA 6
USC	44	64	(.407)	USC 1
Utah	28	38	(.424)	UTAH 2
Washington	44	49	(.473)	WASH 3
Wash. St.	49	42	(.538)	ASU 3

== Postseason results ==
=== NCAA tournament results ===
The Sun Devils have appeared in the NCAA tournament 16* (15) times. Their combined record is 15–18* (14–17). ASU's 1995 NCAA tournament appearance (2 wins, 1 loss) was vacated by the NCAA.

Year	Seed	Round	Opponent	Result
1958		First Round	Idaho State	L 68–72
1961		First Round; Sweet Sixteen; Elite Eight	Seattle; USC; Utah	W 72–70; W 86–71; L 80–88
1962		First Round	Utah State	L 73–78
1963		First Round; Sweet Sixteen; Elite Eight	Utah State; UCLA; Oregon State	W 79–75 ^{OT} W 93–79; L 65–83
1964		First Round	Utah State	L 90–92
1973		First Round; Sweet Sixteen; Regional 3rd Place Game	Oklahoma City; UCLA; Long Beach State	W 103–78; L 81–98; L 80–84
1975		First Round; Sweet Sixteen; Elite Eight	Alabama; UNLV; UCLA	W 97–94; W 84–81; L 75–89
1980	#5	First Round; Second Round	#12 Loyola Marymount #4 Ohio State	W 99–71; L 75–89
1981	#2	Second Round	#7 Kansas	L 71–88
1991	#8	First Round; Second Round	#9 Rutgers #1 Arkansas	W 79–76; L 90–97
1995*	#5	First Round; Second Round; Sweet Sixteen	#12 Ball State #13 Manhattan #1 Kentucky	W 81–66*; W 64–54*; L 73–97*
2003	#10	First Round; Second Round	#7 Memphis #2 Kansas	W 84–71; L 76–108
2009	#6	First Round; Second Round	#11 Temple #3 Syracuse	W 66–57; L 67–78
2014	#10	Second Round	#7 Texas	L 85–87
2018	#11	First Four	#11 Syracuse	L 56–60
2019	#11	First Four; First Round	#11 St. John's #6 Buffalo	W 74–65; L 74–91
2023	#11	First Four; First Round	#11 Nevada #6 TCU	W 98–73; L 70–72

=== NIT results ===
The Sun Devils have appeared in the National Invitation Tournament (NIT) 13 times. Their combined record is 7–13.

Year	Round	Opponent	Result
1983	First Round (Tempe, AZ); Second Round (Tempe, AZ)	Cal State Fullerton; TCU	W 87–83; L 76–78
1990	First Round (Tempe, AZ)	Long Beach State	L 71–86
1992	First Round (Santa Barbara, CA); Second Round (Tempe, AZ)	UC Santa Barbara; Utah	W 71–65; L 58–80
1993	First Round (Tempe, AZ)	Georgetown	L 68–78
1994	First Round (Provo, UT)	BYU	L 67–74
1998	First Round (Honolulu, HI)	Hawaiʻi	L 73–90
2000	First Round (Tempe, AZ); Second Round (Raleigh, NC)	New Mexico State; NC State	W 83–77; L 57–60
2002	First Round (Las Vegas, NV)	UNLV	L 91–96
2005	First Round (Las Vegas, NV)	UNLV	L 78–89
2008	First Round (Tempe, AZ); Second Round (Tempe, AZ); Quarterfinals (Tempe, AZ)	Alabama State; Southern Illinois; Florida	W 64–53; W 65–51; L 57–70
2010	First Round (Tempe, AZ)	Jacksonville	L 66–67
2013	First Round (Tempe, AZ); Second Round (Waco, TX)	Detroit; Baylor	W 83–68; L 86–89
2015	First Round (Storrs, CT); Second Round (Richmond, VA)	Connecticut; Richmond	W 68–61; L 70–76 ^{OT}

=== NAIA tournament results ===
Arizona State appeared in the NAIA basketball tournament twice. Their combined record is 2–2.

Year	Round	Opponent	Result
1948	First Round; Second Round	Northeast Missouri State; Mankato State	W 68–66; L 53–54
1953	First Round; Second Round	East Tennessee State; Nebraska Wesleyan	W 81–79; L 71–83

=== Commissioners' Invitational results ===
Arizona State appeared in the National Commissioners Invitational Tournament once. Their overall record is 0–1.

Year	Round	Opponent	Result
1974	First Round (St. Louis, MO)	Toledo	L 74–81

=== CBC results ===
Arizona State has appeared in the College Basketball Crown once. Their overall record is 0–1.

Year	Round	Opponent	Result
2025	First Round	Nebraska	L 78–86

=== Retired numbers ===
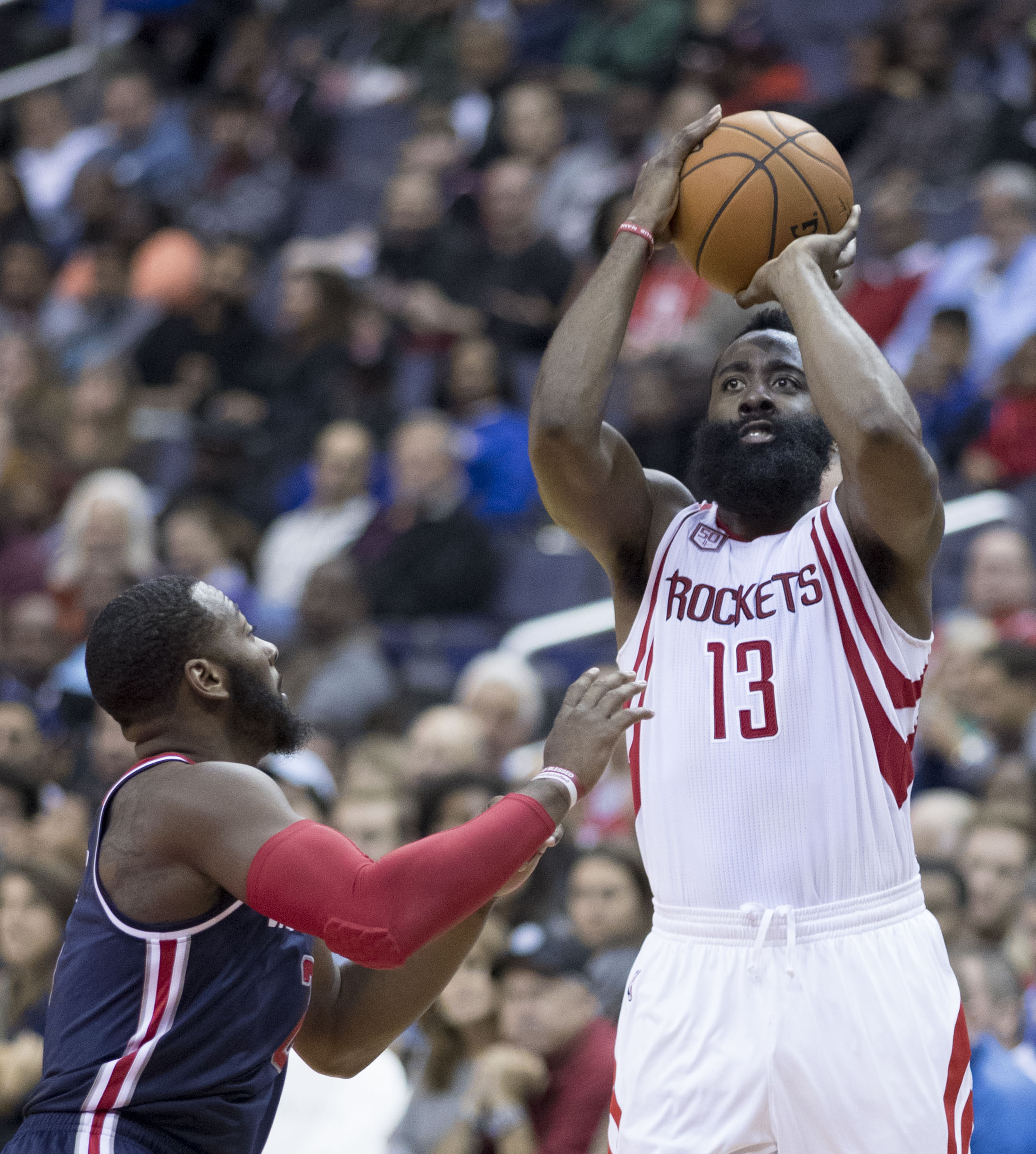
James Harden played two seasons for the Sun Devils before entering the NBA. His number 13 was retired by Arizona State in 2015

Arizona State Sun Devils retired numbers
No.	Player	Career	Yr. ret.	Ref.
13	James Harden (Note: In 2020, Harden gave Josh Christopher permission to wear his retired #13 number.)	2007–2009	2015	

== Honored jerseys ==
The Sun Devils have honored eight jerseys in program history, most recently Ike Diogu's 5 in 2022. Nevertheless, the numbers are active and available for use.

No.	Player	Career
5	Eddie House	1996–2000
5	Ike Diogu	2002–2005
11	Byron Scott	1979–1983
12	Fat Lever	1978–1982
13	James Harden	2007–2009
32	Joe Caldwell	1961–1964
33	Lionel Hollins	1973–1975
53	Alton Lister	1978–1981

== NBA & ABA Individual Achievements ==
National Basketball Association

- NBA Most Valuable Player

Years	player	positions	Team
2017–18	James Harden	Shooting guard	Houston Rockets

- List of NBA All-Stars

Year	player	positions
1969, 1970	Joe Caldwell	Shooting guard/small forward
2013–2022; 2025	James Harden	Shooting guard
1978	Lionel Hollins	Point guard
1988, 1990	Fat Lever	Point guard

- NBA Champion

Year	player	position	Team
2014	Jeff Ayres	Power forward	San Antonio Spurs
2025	Luguentz Dort	Small forward	Oklahoma City Thunder
1978	Lionel Hollins	Point guard	Portland Trail Blazers
2008	Eddie House	Shooting guard	Boston Celtics
1980, 1982	Mark Landsberger	Power forward	Los Angeles Lakers
1985, 1987, 1988	Byron Scott	Shooting guard	Los Angeles Lakers

ABA Individual Achievements

- ABA Champion

Year	player	position	Team
1970, 1972, 1973	Freddie Lewis	Point guard	Indiana Pacers

Year	player	position	Team
1970	Art Becker	Power Forward	Indiana Pacers

- ABA All-Star Game

Year	player	position
1968, 1972	Art Becker	Power forward
1971, 1973	Joe Caldwell	Shooting guard/small forward
1968, 1972, 1975	Freddie Lewis	Point guard
