= 1963–64 Gonzaga Bulldogs men's basketball team =

American college basketball season

1963–64 Gonzaga Bulldogs men's basketball
- Conference: Big Sky Conference
- Record: 10-15 (5–5 Big Sky)
- Head coach: Hank Anderson (13th season)
- Home arena: Spokane Coliseum

1963–64 Big Sky men's basketball standings
	Conf.				Overall
Team	W		L	PCT	W		L	PCT
Montana State	8	–	2	.800	16	–	9	.640
Weber State	7	–	3	.700	17	–	8	.680
Idaho State	5	–	5	.500	10	–	15	.400
Gonzaga	5	–	5	.500	11	–	13	.458
Idaho	4	–	6	.400	7	–	19	.269
Montana	1	–	9	.100	6	–	17	.261

The 1963–64 Gonzaga Bulldogs men's basketball team represented Gonzaga University during the 1963–64 NCAA University Division basketball season. In the inaugural season of the Big Sky Conference, the Bulldogs were led by thirteenth-year head coach Hank Anderson and played their home games off campus at the Spokane Coliseum in Spokane, Washington. They were 10-15 overall and 5–5 in conference play.

== Schedule ==
Date time, TV	Rank^{#}	Opponent^{#}	Result	Record	Site city, state
Dec 2, 1963*		Eastern Washington	W 108–57	1–0	Spokane Coliseum
Dec 6, 1963*		Eastern Montana	L 69–73	1–1	Spokane Coliseum
Dec 7, 1963*		at Eastern Montana	W 103–70	2–1	
Dec 9, 1963*		Whitworth	W 91–77	3–1	Spokane Coliseum
Dec 13, 1963*		at Portland	L 100–105	3–2	
Dec 14, 1963*		at Santa Clara	W 87–74	4–2	
Dec 17, 1963*		at Wisconsin	L 71–115	4–3	
Dec 18, 1963*		at Creighton	L 79–89	4–4	
Jan 2, 1964*		at Portland	L 80–99	4–5	
Jan 4, 1964		at Idaho	W 69–61	5–5	
Jan 9, 1964		Montana	W 100–83	6–5	Spokane Coliseum
Jan 11, 1964*		at * Montana State	L 72–82	6–6	
Jan 16, 1964		Idaho	W 75–65	7–6	Spokane Coliseum
Jan 20, 1964*		at Eastern Washington	W 80–75	8–6	
Jan 23, 1964		Weber State	L 72–77	8–7	Spokane Coliseum
Feb 6, 1964		Idaho State	W 77–64	9–7	Spokane Coliseum
Feb 9, 1964*		Seattle University	L 90–98	9–8	Spokane Coliseum
Feb 14, 1964*		at Oregon	L 66–77	9–9	
Feb 15, 1964*		at Oregon	L 80–105	9–10	
Feb 17, 1964*		at Seattle University	L 88–108	9–11	
Feb 20, 1964		at Idaho State	L 95–103	9–12	
Feb 22, 1964		at Weber State	L 73–87	9–13	
Feb 27, 1964		at Montana State	L 60–69	9–14	
Feb 29, 1964		at Montana	W 83–81	10–14	
Mar 2, 1964*		Portland	L 84–88	10–15	Spokane Coliseum
*Non-conference game. ^{#}Rankings from AP Poll. (#) Tournament seedings in parentheses.
