= 1979–80 Washington Huskies men's basketball team =

American college basketball season

1979–80 Washington Huskies men's basketball

National Invitation Tournament, First round
- Conference: Pacific-10 Conference
- Record: 18–10 (9–9 Pac-10)
- Head coach: Marv Harshman (9th season)
- Assistant coach: Bob Johnson
- Home arena: Hec Edmundson Pavilion

1979–80 Pacific-10 Conference men's basketball standings
	Conf.				Overall
Team	W		L	PCT	W		L	PCT
^#5 Oregon State	16	–	2	.889	26	–	3	.897
No. 18 Arizona State	15	–	3	.833	22	–	7	.759
Washington State	14	–	4	.778	22	–	6	.786
*UCLA	12	–	6	.667	17	–	9	.654
Washington	9	–	9	.500	18	–	10	.643
Arizona	6	–	12	.333	12	–	15	.444
USC	5	–	13	.278	12	–	15	.444
Oregon	5	–	13	.278	10	–	17	.370
Stanford	5	–	13	.278	7	–	19	.269
California	3	–	15	.167	8	–	19	.296
As of April 15, 1980; *Oregon State vacated all tournament games (0–1) due to NCAA sanctions. Disputed record (16-2, 26-4)^UCLA vacated all tournament games (5–1) due to NCAA sanctions. Disputed record (22-10, 12-6); Rankings from AP Poll

The 1979–80 Washington Huskies men's basketball team represented the University of Washington for the 1979–80 NCAA Division I men's basketball season. Led by ninth-year head coach Marv Harshman, the Huskies were members of the Pacific-10 Conference and played their home games on campus at Hec Edmundson Pavilion in Seattle, Washington.

The Huskies were 18–9 overall in the regular season and 9–9 in conference play, fifth in the standings. There was no conference tournament yet; it debuted seven years later.

This was Washington's first appearance in the National Invitation Tournament, they played UNLV in the first round and lost by twenty points. The Pac-8 did not allow participation in the NIT until 1973. The 1972 Huskies were 20–6 overall and 10–4 in conference, second in the standings; but stayed home for the postseason.

== Postseason result ==
Date time, TV	Opponent	Result	Record	Site (attendance) city, state
National Invitation Tournament
Fri, March 7*	at UNLV; First round	L 73–93	18–10	Las Vegas Convention Center (6,380); Las Vegas, Nevada
*Non-conference game. ^{#}Rankings from AP poll. (#) Tournament seedings in parentheses. All times are in Pacific time.
