= Jim Goddard (basketball) =

American basketball player and coach (1929–2024)

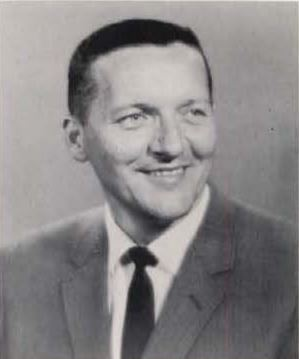
- Goddard during the 1965–66 season

Biographical details
- Born: October 2, 1929; Salem, Oregon, U.S.
- Died: January 16, 2024 (aged 94); Moscow, Idaho, U.S.

Playing career
- 1948–1952: Lewis & Clark
- Position: Guard

Coaching career (HC unless noted)
- 1957–1959: Lewis & Clark (assistant)
- 1959–1963: Lewis & Clark
- 1963–1966: Idaho

James David Goddard (October 2, 1929 – January 16, 2024) was an American college basketball coach in the western United States.

Goddard was the head coach at Idaho for three seasons and previously at his alma mater Lewis & Clark College in Portland, Oregon.

== Biography ==
From Salem, Oregon, Goddard had been on the basketball coaching staff at Lewis & Clark for the previous six seasons, the last four as head coach. In each of the last two years, the Pioneers won the season title in the Northwest Conference, then in NAIA; and both teams advanced to the 32-team national tournament in Kansas City, Missouri. Lewis & Clark won in the first round in 1962, and advanced to the quarterfinals in 1963; that team was inducted into the school's athletic hall of fame.

After Idaho's successful 20–6 season in 1963 with Gus Johnson at center, head coach Joe Cipriano departed for Nebraska, and athletic director Skip Stahley hired Goddard in April. He led the Vandals for the first three seasons of the six-team Big Sky Conference, then unexpectedly resigned in August 1966 for an administrative position at the Oregon department of education in Salem. He was succeeded by alumnus Wayne Anderson, a longtime assistant and head baseball coach.

Goddard died in Moscow, Idaho on January 16, 2024, at the age of 94.

== Head coaching record ==
Record table
Season	Team	Overall	Conference	Standing	Postseason
Lewis & Clark Pioneers (Northwest Conference) (1959–1963)
1959–60	Lewis & Clark	9–15	7–8	4th	
1960–61	Lewis & Clark	14–11	9–6	3rd	
1961–62	Lewis & Clark	20–11	13–2	1st	NAIA Second Round
1962–63	Lewis & Clark	23–6	13–2	1st	NAIA Quarterfinal
Lewis & Clark:		66–43 (.606)	42–18 (.700)		
Idaho Vandals (Big Sky Conference) (1963–1966)
1963–64	Idaho	7–19	4–6	5th	
1964–65	Idaho	6–19	4–6	4th	
1965–66	Idaho	12–14	2–8	5th	
Idaho:		25–52 (.325)	10–20 (.333)		
Total:		91–95 (.489)			
National champion Postseason invitational champion Conference regular season champion Conference regular season and conference tournament champion Division regular season champion Division regular season and conference tournament champion Conference tournament champion
