= 1967–68 Idaho Vandals men's basketball team =

American college basketball season

1967–68 Idaho Vandals men's basketball
- Conference: Big Sky Conference
- Record: 15–11 (9–3 Big Sky)
- Head coach: Wayne Anderson (2nd season)
- MVP: Jim Thacker
- Home arena: Memorial Gymnasium

1967–68 Big Sky men's basketball standings
	Conf.				Overall
Team	W		L	PCT	W		L	PCT
Weber State	12	–	3	.800	21	–	6	.778
Idaho	9	–	3	.750	15	–	11	.577
Idaho State	7	–	8	.467	13	–	13	.500
Montana State	6	–	9	.400	10	–	15	.400
Gonzaga	6	–	9	.400	9	–	17	.346
Montana	5	–	10	.333	8	–	17	.320

The 1967–68 Idaho Vandals men's basketball team represented the University of Idaho during the 1967–68 NCAA University Division basketball season. Charter members of the Big Sky Conference, the Vandals were led by second-year head coach Wayne Anderson and played their home games on campus at the Memorial Gymnasium in Moscow, Idaho. They were 15–11 overall and 9–3 in conference play.
