= 1968–69 Idaho State Bengals men's basketball team =

American college basketball season

1968–69 Idaho State Bengals men's basketball
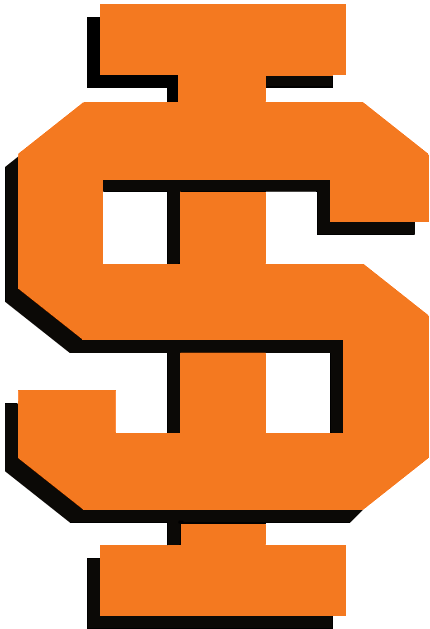
- Conference: Big Sky Conference
- Record: 8–18 (3–12 Big Sky)
- Head coach: Dan Miller (2nd season)
- Home arena: Reed Gym

1968–69 Big Sky men's basketball standings
	Conf.				Overall
Team	W		L	PCT	W		L	PCT
Weber State	15	–	0	1.000	27	–	3	.900
Montana State	11	–	4	.733	17	–	8	.680
Gonzaga	6	–	9	.400	11	–	15	.423
Idaho	6	–	9	.400	11	–	15	.423
Montana	4	–	11	.267	9	–	17	.346
Idaho State	3	–	12	.200	8	–	18	.308

The 1968–69 Idaho State Bengals men's basketball team represented Idaho State University during the 1968–69 NCAA University Division basketball season. Led by second-year head coach Dan Miller, the Bengals played their home games on campus at Reed Gym in Pocatello.

Idaho State finished the regular season at 8–18 overall, with a 3–12 record in the Big Sky Conference.

The ISU Minidome became the new home court two seasons later, in the fall of 1970.
