= 1968–69 Weber State Wildcats men's basketball team =

American college basketball season

1968–69 Weber State Wildcats men's basketball

Big Sky Champions

NCAA tournament, Sweet Sixteen
- Conference: Big Sky Conference

Ranking
- Coaches: No. 17
- Record: 27–3 (15–0 Big Sky)
- Head coach: Phil Johnson (1st season)
- Assistant coach: Gene Visscher
- Home arena: Wildcat Gym

1968–69 Big Sky men's basketball standings
	Conf.				Overall
Team	W		L	PCT	W		L	PCT
Weber State	15	–	0	1.000	27	–	3	.900
Montana State	11	–	4	.733	17	–	8	.680
Gonzaga	6	–	9	.400	11	–	15	.423
Idaho	6	–	9	.400	11	–	15	.423
Montana	4	–	11	.267	9	–	17	.346
Idaho State	3	–	12	.200	8	–	18	.308

The 1968–69 Weber State Wildcats men's basketball team represented Weber State College during the 1968–69 NCAA University Division basketball season. Members of the Big Sky Conference, the Wildcats were led by first-year head coach Phil Johnson and played their home games on campus at Wildcat Gym in Ogden, Utah. They were 25–2 in the regular season and 15–0 in conference play.

For the second consecutive season, Weber State won the Big Sky title and played in the 25-team NCAA tournament. In the West regional at Las Cruces, New Mexico, they defeated Seattle by two points and advanced to the Sweet Sixteen at Pauley Pavilion in Los Angeles, against third-ranked Santa Clara. The Broncos won by four points in overtime, and Weber won the third-place game over #12 New Mexico State by two.

Johnson had been an assistant coach at Weber under Dick Motta, his high school coach, who left to become head coach of the NBA's Chicago Bulls. After his third year as head coach of the Wildcats, Johnson joined Motta as an assistant in Chicago in 1971.

== Postseason results ==
Date time, TV	Opponent	Result	Record	Site (attendance) city, state
NCAA Tournament
Sat, March 8*; 7:05 pm	vs. Seattle; First round	W 75–73	26–2	Pan American Center (12,140); Las Cruces, New Mexico
Thu, March 13*	vs. No. 3 Santa Clara; Regional semifinal (Sweet 16)	L 59–63 ^{OT}	26–3	Pauley Pavilion (11,700); Los Angeles, California
Sat, March 15*	vs. No. 12 New Mexico State; Regional Third Place	W 58–56	27–3	Pauley Pavilion (11,190); Los Angeles, California
*Non-conference game. ^{#}Rankings from AP Poll. (#) Tournament seedings in parentheses. All times are in Mountain time.
