= 1964–65 Idaho Vandals men's basketball team =

American college basketball season

1964–65 Idaho Vandals men's basketball
- Conference: Big Sky Conference
- Record: 6–19 (4–6 Big Sky)
- Head coach: Jim Goddard (2nd season)
- Assistant coach: Wayne Anderson
- MVP: Tom Moreland
- Home arena: Memorial Gymnasium

1964–65 Big Sky men's basketball standings
	Conf.				Overall
Team	W		L	PCT	W		L	PCT
Weber State	8	–	2	.800	22	–	3	.880
Gonzaga	6	–	4	.600	18	–	8	.692
Montana State	6	–	4	.600	15	–	10	.600
Idaho	4	–	6	.400	6	–	19	.240
Idaho State	4	–	6	.400	7	–	19	.269
Montana	2	–	8	.200	11	–	15	.423

The 1964–65 Idaho Vandals men's basketball team represented the University of Idaho during the 1964–65 NCAA University Division basketball season. Charter members of the Big Sky Conference, the Vandals were led by second-year head coach Jim Goddard and played their home games on campus at the Memorial Gymnasium in Moscow, Idaho. They were 6–19 overall and 4–6 in conference play.
