= 1967–68 Gonzaga Bulldogs men's basketball team =

American college basketball season

1967–68 Gonzaga Bulldogs men's basketball
- Conference: Big Sky Conference
- Record: 9–17 (6–9 Big Sky)
- Head coach: Hank Anderson (17th season)
- Home arena: Kennedy Pavilion

1967–68 Big Sky men's basketball standings
	Conf.				Overall
Team	W		L	PCT	W		L	PCT
Weber State	12	–	3	.800	21	–	6	.778
Idaho	9	–	3	.750	15	–	11	.577
Idaho State	7	–	8	.467	13	–	13	.500
Montana State	6	–	9	.400	10	–	15	.400
Gonzaga	6	–	9	.400	9	–	17	.346
Montana	5	–	10	.333	8	–	17	.320

The 1967–68 Gonzaga Bulldogs men's basketball team represented Gonzaga University during the 1967–68 NCAA University Division basketball season. In the fifth season of the Big Sky Conference, the Bulldogs were led by seventeenth-year head coach Hank Anderson and played their home games on campus at Kennedy Pavilion in Spokane, Washington. They were 9–17 overall and 6–9 in conference play.

== Schedule ==
Date time, TV	Rank^{#}	Opponent^{#}	Result	Record	Site city, state
Dec 2, 1967*		at Washington State	L 66–95	0–1	
Dec 9, 1967*		at Whitworth	L 71–80	0–2	
Dec 15, 1967*		at Portland	W 60–54	1–2	
Dec 16, 1967*		at Idaho	W 59–53	2–2	
Dec 27, 1967*		at Rhode Island	L 81–89	2–3	
Dec 28, 1967*		at San Jose State	L 68–88	2–4	
Jan 6, 1968		at Idaho	L 65–74	2–5	
Jan 12, 1968		at Montana	L 75–94	2–6	
Jan 13, 1968		at Montana	T 82–82	3–6	
Jan 15, 1968		at Montana State	L 73–75	3–7	
Jan 20, 1968*		at Portland State	W 68–67	4–7	
Jan 27, 1968*		at San Diego	L 66–69	4–8	
Feb 2, 1968		at Idaho	L 65–70	4–9	
Feb 3, 1968*		at Washington State	L 70–101	4–10	
Feb 9, 1968		at Weber State	L 62–84	4–11	
Feb 10, 1968		at Weber State	L 51–72	4–12	
Feb 12, 1968		at Idaho State	W 82–78	5–12	
Feb 16, 1968		at Idaho State	L 88–97	5–13	
Feb 17, 1968		at Idaho State	L 65–68	5–14	
Feb 19, 1968		at Weber State	L 60–81	5–15	
Feb 23, 1968		at Montana State	W 77–71	6–15	
Feb 24, 1968		at Montana State	W 69–63	7–15	
Feb 26, 1968		at Montana	W 81–56	8–15	
Feb 29, 1968*		at Seattle University	L 87–95	8–16	
Mar 2, 1968		at Idaho	W 94–75	9–16	
Mar 9, 1968*		at Portland	L 82–94	9–17	
*Non-conference game. ^{#}Rankings from AP Poll. (#) Tournament seedings in parentheses.
