= 1979–80 Loyola Marymount Lions men's basketball team =

American college basketball season

1979–80 Loyola Marymount Lions men's basketball

NCAA tournament, first round
- Conference: West Coast Conference
- Record: 14–14 (10–6 WCAC)
- Head coach: Rob Jacobs (1st season)
- Home arena: Loyola Memorial Gymnasium

1979–80 West Coast Athletic Conference men's basketball standings
	Conf.				Overall
Team	W		L	PCT	W		L	PCT
San Francisco	11	–	5	.688	22	–	7	.759
Loyola Marymount	10	–	6	.625	14	–	14	.500
Pepperdine	9	–	7	.563	17	–	10	.630
Portland	9	–	7	.563	17	–	11	.607
Saint Mary's	9	–	7	.563	13	–	14	.481
Gonzaga	8	–	8	.500	13	–	13	.500
Santa Clara	8	–	8	.500	13	–	14	.481
Seattle	7	–	9	.438	11	–	16	.407
San Diego	1	–	15	.063	5	–	20	.200
Rankings from AP Poll

The 1979–80 Loyola Marymount Lions men's basketball team represented Loyola Marymount University during the 1979–80 NCAA Division I men's basketball season. The Lions were led by first-year head coach Ron Jacobs. They played their home games at Loyola Memorial Gymnasium in Los Angeles, California as members of the West Coast Athletic Conference.

LMU went 10–6 in conference regular season games to finish second in the standings, but received the conference's bid to the NCAA tournament. Playing as the No. 12 seed in the West region, the Lions were beaten by No. 5 seed Arizona State, 99–71 in the opening round.

== Roster ==
1979–80 Loyola Marymount Lions men's basketball team
Players
Coaches

Pos.	#	Name	Height	Weight	Year	Previous school	Hometown
G	10	Mike Dunlap	5 ft 10 in (1.78 m)	—	Sr	Lathrop	Fairbanks, Alaska
G		Dan Davis	5 ft 11 in (1.8 m)	—	Jr
F		Jim McCloskey	6 ft 7 in (2.01 m)	—	Jr

Head coach

- Ron Jacobs

Assistant coach(es)

Legend

- (C) Team captain
- (S) Suspended
- (I) Ineligible
- (W) Walk-on
- Injured
- Current redshirt

Roster

== Schedule and results ==
Date time, TV	Rank^{#}	Opponent^{#}	Result	Record	Site (attendance) city, state
Non-conference regular season
Dec 1, 1979*		at Arkansas	L 66–76	0–1	Barnhill Arena; Fayetteville, Arkansas
Dec 3, 1979*		at Oklahoma	L 82–87	0–2	Lloyd Noble Center; Norman, Oklahoma
Dec 6, 1979*		at UC Santa Barbara	W 69–53	1–2	The Thunderdome; Santa Barbara, California
Dec 8, 1979*		at Fresno State	L 59–62	1–3	Selland Arena; Fresno, California
Dec 12, 1979*		Azusa Pacific	L 64–65	1–4	Loyola Memorial Gymnasium; Los Angeles, California
Dec 15, 1979*		vs. No. 16 Georgetown; Nike Cage Classic	L 63–69	1–5	University Arena (5,221); Albuquerque, New Mexico
Dec 16, 1979*		at New Mexico; Nike Cage Classic	W 71–70	2–5	University Arena; Albuquerque, New Mexico
Dec 19, 1979*		Cal State Los Angeles	W 72–46	3–5	Loyola Memorial Gymnasium; Los Angeles, California
Dec 22, 1979*		at Cal State Fullerton	W 77–67	4–5	Titan Gym; Fullerton, California
Dec 28, 1979*		vs. UNLV; Holiday Classic	L 87–105	4–6	Las Vegas Convention Center; Las Vegas, Nevada
Dec 29, 1979*		vs. Michigan State; Holiday Classic	L 65–82	4–7	Las Vegas Convention Center; Las Vegas, Nevada
WCAC regular season
Jan 4, 1980		at Saint Mary's	W 104–100	5–7 (1–0)	McKeon Pavilion; Moraga, California
Jan 5, 1980		at Santa Clara	W 108–94	6–7 (2–0)	Toso Pavilion; Santa Clara, California
Jan 12, 1980		at Pepperdine	L 74–88	6–8 (2–1)	Firestone Fieldhouse; Malibu, California
Jan 18, 1980		San Diego	W 83–80	7–8 (3–1)	Loyola Memorial Gymnasium; Los Angeles, California
Jan 19, 1980		San Francisco	L 75–89	7–9 (3–2)	Loyola Memorial Gymnasium; Los Angeles, California
Jan 25, 1980		at Gonzaga	W 92–80	8–9 (4–2)	Kennedy Pavilion; Spokane, Washington
Feb 1, 1980		Portland	L 75–89	8–10 (4–3)	Loyola Memorial Gymnasium; Los Angeles, California
Feb 2, 1980		Seattle	L 84–86	8–11 (4–4)	Loyola Memorial Gymnasium; Los Angeles, California
Feb 7, 1980		at San Francisco	L 90–92	8–12 (4–5)	War Memorial Gymnasium; San Francisco, California
Feb 9, 1980		at San Diego	W 100–82	9–12 (5–5)	USD Sports Center; San Diego, California
Feb 12, 1980		Pepperdine	W 85–84	10–12 (6–5)	Loyola Memorial Gymnasium; Los Angeles, California
Feb 16, 1980		Gonzaga	W 84–79	11–12 (7–5)	Loyola Memorial Gymnasium; Los Angeles, California
Feb 22, 1980		at Portland	L 77–92	11–13 (7–6)	Howard Hall; Portland, Oregon
Feb 24, 1980		at Seattle	W 86–82	12–13 (8–6)	Climate Pledge Arena; Seattle, Washington
Feb 29, 1980		Santa Clara	W 87–81	13–13 (9–6)	Loyola Memorial Gymnasium; Los Angeles, California
Mar 1, 1980		Saint Mary's	W 95–81	14–13 (10–6)	Loyola Memorial Gymnasium; Los Angeles, California
NCAA Tournament
Mar 7, 1980*; ESPN	(12 W)	vs. (5 W) No. 18 Arizona State; First round	L 71–99	14–14	ASU Activity Center; Tempe, Arizona
*Non-conference game. ^{#}Rankings from AP Poll. (#) Tournament seedings in parentheses.
