= 1980–81 Gonzaga Bulldogs men's basketball team =

American college basketball season

1980–81 Gonzaga Bulldogs men's basketball
- Conference: West Coast Athletic Conference
- Record: 19–8 (9–5 WCAC)
- Head coach: Dan Fitzgerald (3rd season)
- Assistant coach: Jay Hillock
- Home arena: Kennedy Pavilion

1980–81 West Coast Athletic Conference men's basketball standings
	Conf.				Overall
Team	W		L	PCT	W		L	PCT
San Francisco	11	–	3	.786	23	–	7	.767
Pepperdine	11	–	3	.786	16	–	11	.593
Gonzaga	9	–	5	.643	19	–	8	.704
Portland	7	–	7	.500	17	–	10	.630
Santa Clara	7	–	7	.500	14	–	13	.519
Loyola Marymount	5	–	9	.357	9	–	19	.321
San Diego	3	–	11	.214	10	–	16	.385
Saint Mary's	3	–	11	.214	9	–	18	.333
Rankings from AP Poll

The 1980–81 Gonzaga Bulldogs men's basketball team represented Gonzaga University in the West Coast Athletic Conference (WCAC) during the 1980–81 NCAA Division I men's basketball season. Led by 3rd season with head coach Dan Fitzgerald, the Bulldogs were 19–8 (.704) overall (9–5 in WCAC, 3rd), and played their home games on campus at Kennedy Pavilion in Spokane, Washington.

A loss in the finale to Portland likely cost Gonzaga a berth in the National Invitation Tournament (NIT). A 1980 graduate of Gonzaga Prep, point guard John Stockton was a freshman this season.

After the season, athletic director Fitzgerald stepped down as head coach and promoted assistant coach Jay Hillock. Four years later, Fitzgerald returned as head coach, and led the Zags for an additional twelve seasons (fifteen total).
