= Hank Anderson =

American basketball player and coach, college athletics administrator (1920–2005)

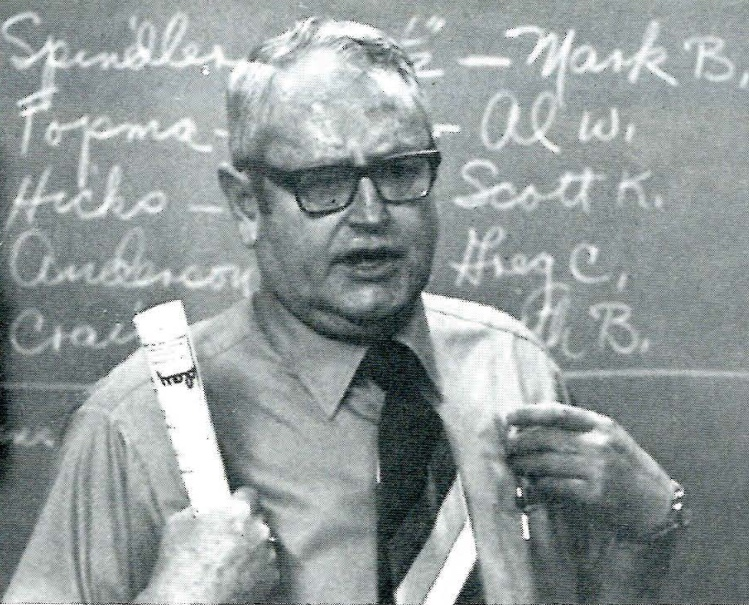
- Anderson from the 1973 Montanan

Biographical details
- Born: December 5, 1920; Milton-Freewater, Oregon, U.S.
- Died: September 5, 2005 (aged 84); Gig Harbor, Washington, U.S.

Playing career
- 1937–1939: Eastern Oregon Normal
- 1939–1941: Oregon
- Position: Forward

Coaching career (HC unless noted)
- 1941–1942: Baker HS
- 1945–1946: Baker HS
- 1946–1947: Medford HS
- 1947–1951: Grants Pass HS
- 1951–1972: Gonzaga
- 1972–1974: Montana State

Administrative career (AD unless noted)
- 1953–1972: Gonzaga
- 1974–1983: Northern Arizona

Head coaching record
- Overall: 318–299 (.515)

Accomplishments and honors

Championships
- 2× Big Sky co-champions (1966, 1967)

Awards
- Big Sky Coach of the Year (1966)

Thor Henry Anderson (December 5, 1920 – September 5, 2005) was a college basketball coach and athletic director (AD). He was the head coach at Gonzaga University for 21 seasons, from 1951 to 1972, where he compiled a 290–275 (.513) record. Anderson later coached two seasons at Montana State University in Bozeman at 28–24 (.538) for a career record of 318–299 (.515). He finished his career in college athletics as the AD at Northern Arizona University in Flagstaff.

== Early years ==
Born in Milton-Freewater in eastern Oregon, Anderson graduated from Burns High School in Burns at age 16 in 1937, and then played college basketball for Eastern Oregon Normal School in La Grande. After two years, he transferred to the University of Oregon in Eugene, and was a 6 ft 7 in (2.01 m) Forward for the Ducks under head coach Howard Hobson.

== High school coach ==
Anderson earned his bachelor's degree in 1941 at age twenty, and was in graduate school in Eugene when he accepted his first head coaching job at Baker High School in eastern Oregon that October.

He served as an officer in the U.S. Army Air Forces in World War II and returned to Baker in 1945, then moved to western Oregon at Medford in 1946 and Grants Pass in 1947. His 1950 team was state runner-up and he had a career prep record of 167–43 (.795) prior to taking the Gonzaga job in April 1951 at age thirty.

== College coach and administrator ==
Gonzaga's previous head coach, L. T. Underwood, finished the 1951 season at 8–22 (.267) and resigned after just two years with the Bulldogs. Anderson's first team was much improved in 1952 at 19–16 (.543), and after two seasons, he took on the added role of AD in 1953. The program elevated to NCAA Division I in 1958, joined the Big Sky Conference as a charter member in 1963, and opened the on-campus Kennedy Pavilion in 1965. Anderson was Big Sky coach of the year in 1966, and stepped down as AD in 1972, then surprisingly left several weeks later to become head coach at Montana State in Bozeman, a conference rival. He spent two seasons at MSU, then departed for another Big Sky school in 1974 to become the athletic director at Northern Arizona in Flagstaff. Anderson oversaw the building of the Walkup Skydome and was also on the board of directors of the Fiesta Bowl in Tempe; he stayed at NAU nearly a decade and retired at the end of 1983 at age 63.

== Later life ==
Anderson then moved to Las Vegas in 1984 to work in minor league baseball for the Las Vegas Stars. The team, formerly the Spokane Indians from 1973 to 1982, was headed by Larry Koentopp, the former Gonzaga baseball coach hired by Anderson in 1969 and his successor as GU athletic director in 1972.

Anderson and his wife Betty, married in 1943, later retired to Gig Harbor, Washington. He died in September 2005 at age 84 of an aortic aneurysm in Gig Harbor.

== College head coaching record ==
Record table
Season	Team	Overall	Conference	Standing	Postseason
Gonzaga Bulldogs (Independent) (1951–1963)
1951–52	Gonzaga	19–16			
1952–53	Gonzaga	15–14			NAIA First Round
1953–54	Gonzaga	12–16			
1954–55	Gonzaga	16–13			
1955–56	Gonzaga	13–15			
1956–57	Gonzaga	11–16			
1957–58	Gonzaga	16–10			
1958–59	Gonzaga	11–15			
1959–60	Gonzaga	14–12			
1960–61	Gonzaga	11–15			
1961–62	Gonzaga	14–12			
1962–63	Gonzaga	14–12			
Gonzaga Bulldogs (Big Sky) (1963–1972)
1963–64	Gonzaga	10–15	5–5	T-3rd	
1964–65	Gonzaga	18–8	6–4	T-2nd	
1965–66	Gonzaga	19–7	8–2	T-1st	
1966–67	Gonzaga	20–6	7–3	T-1st	
1967–68	Gonzaga	9–17	6–9	T-4th	
1968–69	Gonzaga	11–15	6–9	T-3rd	
1969–70	Gonzaga	10–16	7–8	3rd	
1970–71	Gonzaga	13–13	6–8	T-5th	
1971–72	Gonzaga	14–12	8–6	T-2nd	
Gonzaga:		290–275 (.513)	59–54 (.522)		
Montana State Bobcats (Big Sky) (1972–1974)
1972–73	Montana State	17–9	9–5	3rd	
1973–74	Montana State	11–15	5–9	T-6th	
Montana State:		28–24 (.538)	14–14 (.500)		
Total:		318–299 (.515)			
National champion Postseason invitational champion Conference regular season champion Conference regular season and conference tournament champion Division regular season champion Division regular season and conference tournament champion Conference tournament champion
