= 1964–65 Gonzaga Bulldogs men's basketball team =

American college basketball season

1964–65 Gonzaga Bulldogs men's basketball
- Conference: Big Sky Conference
- Record: 18–8 (6–4 Big Sky)
- Head coach: Hank Anderson (14th season)
- Home arena: Spokane Coliseum

1964–65 Big Sky men's basketball standings
	Conf.				Overall
Team	W		L	PCT	W		L	PCT
Weber State	8	–	2	.800	22	–	3	.880
Gonzaga	6	–	4	.600	18	–	8	.692
Montana State	6	–	4	.600	15	–	10	.600
Idaho	4	–	6	.400	6	–	19	.240
Idaho State	4	–	6	.400	7	–	19	.269
Montana	2	–	8	.200	11	–	15	.423

The 1964–65 Gonzaga Bulldogs men's basketball team represented Gonzaga University during the 1964–65 NCAA University Division basketball season. In the second season of the Big Sky Conference, the Bulldogs were led by fourteenth-year head coach Hank Anderson and played their home games off campus at the Spokane Coliseum in Spokane, Washington. They were 18–8 overall and 6–4 in conference play.

== Schedule ==
Date time, TV	Rank^{#}	Opponent^{#}	Result	Record	Site city, state
Nov 28, 1964*		Portland State	W 71–53	1–0	Spokane Coliseum
Dec 5, 1964*		at Washington State	W 72–71	2–0	
Dec 11, 1964*		at Pepperdine	W 93–70	3–0	
Dec 12, 1964*		at Portland	L 69–80	3–1	
Dec 14, 1964*		Whitworth	W 69–67	4–1	Spokane Coliseum
Dec 16, 1964*		Washington State	W 54–49	5–1	Spokane Coliseum
Dec 19, 1964*		at Eastern Montana	W 75–63	6–1	
Dec 21, 1964*		at Toledo	L 81–86	6–2	
Dec 22, 1964*		at Duquesne	L 69–83	6–3	
Dec 27, 1964*		at Seattle University	L 87–111	6–4	
Dec 29, 1964*		at British Columbia	W 55–53	7–4	
Dec 30, 1964*		at British Columbia	W 65–51	8–4	
Jan 6, 1965*		at Portland	W 90–81	9–4	
Jan 14, 1965		Montana	W 91–79	10–4	Spokane Coliseum
Jan 16, 1965		Montana State	W 77–69	11–4	Spokane Coliseum
Jan 18, 1965*		at Whitworth	W 65–60	12–4	
Jan 30, 1965		at Montana	L 82–83	12–5	
Feb 3, 1965*		Eastern Washington	W 83–69	13–5	Spokane Coliseum
Feb 6, 1965		at Montana State	W 67–57	14–5	
Feb 12, 1965		at Idaho	L 65–86	14–6	
Feb 17, 1965		Idaho	W 67–61	15–6	Spokane Coliseum
Feb 21, 1965*		St. Martin’S	W 83–67	16–6	Spokane Coliseum
Feb 27, 1965		Idaho State	W 74–53	17–6	Spokane Coliseum
Mar 1, 1965		Weber State	W 77–68	18–6	Spokane Coliseum
Mar 5, 1965		at Weber State	L 67–86	18–7	
Mar 6, 1965		at Idaho State	L 97–101	18–8	
*Non-conference game. ^{#}Rankings from AP Poll. (#) Tournament seedings in parentheses.
