= Spokane Coliseum =

Indoor arena in Spokane, Washington

- The Boone Street Barn
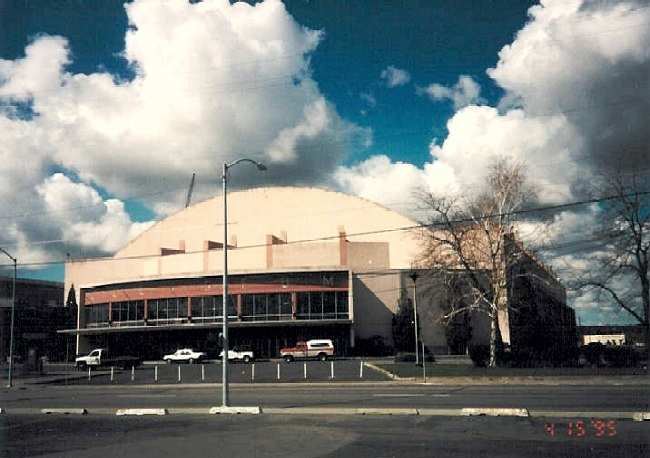
- View west from Howard Street

- Location in the United States Location in Washington
- Interactive map of Spokane Coliseum
- Address: W. Boone Ave. & N. Howard St.
- Location: Spokane, Washington, U.S.
- Coordinates: 47.6675°N 117.422°W
- Capacity: 5,400

Construction
- Groundbreaking: September 28, 1953
- Opened: December 3, 1954
- Closed: Spring 1995
- Demolished: Spring–Summer 1995
- Cost: $2.5 million in 1954 ($30 million in 2025)

Tenants
- Gonzaga Bulldogs (NCAA) (1958–65, 1979–80); Spokane Flyers (WHL) (1980–81); Spokane Chiefs (WHL) (1985–95)

Spokane Coliseum (nicknamed The Boone Street Barn) was an indoor arena in the northwestern United States, located in Spokane, Washington. Opened in late 1954, it had a seating capacity of 5,400.

After more than a year of construction, the arena was dedicated on December 3, 1954, in a program headlined by Metropolitan Opera soprano Patrice Munsel, a Spokane native. The largest crowds in its early years were for a Catholic Mass and stage shows by Lawrence Welk and Liberace, respectively.

It was host to a number of teams, including the Spokane Chiefs of the Western Hockey League (WHL). The arena served as the home of the Gonzaga University basketball team, from its entry into NCAA University Division (now Division I) competition in 1958, until the opening of the on-campus John F. Kennedy Memorial Pavilion in 1965, later the Charlotte Y. Martin Centre. The Bulldogs returned to the Coliseum in 1979, their first year in the West Coast Athletic Conference, for conference home games only, then returned to Kennedy Pavilion for the 1980–81 season. They continued to use the Coliseum for occasional home games until its demise. The venue was used for some events of the 1990 Goodwill Games.

== Replacement ==
During 1990, discussions for a new arena to replace the Spokane Coliseum began. One factor that led to the idea included several damages to the arena which had a leaking roof and rusted boilers. Another major issue was the size of Spokane Coliseum, which had then recently lost potential bookings from ZZ Top and New Kids on the Block due to its small size; Spokane was losing concert dates to larger venues in Pullman and Boise.

The Spokane Coliseum was replaced by the Spokane Veterans Memorial Arena in 1995, and was demolished that spring and summer. The space it occupied is directly north of the new arena, towards Boone Avenue, now a parking lot.

Preceded by Kelowna Memorial Arena (as Kelowna Wings)	Home of the Spokane Chiefs; 1985–1995	Succeeded by Spokane Veterans Memorial Arena
