= Gordon C. White =

Playing career

Football
- 1921–1924: Roanoke
- Position: Guard

Coaching career (HC unless noted)

Football
- 1927–1929: Roanoke (assistant)
- 1930–1941: Roanoke

Basketball
- 1930–1942: Roanoke
- 1945–1946: Gonzaga

Administrative career (AD unless noted)
- 1925–1927: Salem HS (VA)

Head coaching record
- Overall: 51–51–7 (football); 122–81 (basketball)
- Tournaments: Basketball; 0–1 (NIT)

Gordon C. White was an American football and basketball coach. He served as the head football coach at Roanoke College in Salem, Virginia from 1930 to 1941. White was also the head basketball coach at Roanoke from 1930 to 1942 and Gonzaga University in Spokane, Washington for one season, in 1945–46.

White served in the United States Marine Corps during World War I and played college football at Roanoke as a guard from 1921 to 1924. Following his graduation from Roanoke in 1925, White was the athletic director at Salem High School in Salem, Virginia for two years. He returned to Roanoke as an assistant coach in 1927. White succeeded Pinky Spruhan as head coach at Roanoke in 1930 and became athletic director in 1931. In 1938, his football team narrowly lost the Virginia state championship to the VMI.

White coached basketball at Roanoke for 12 seasons, compiling an overall record of 116–67, and became affectionately known as "Pop" or "Pap.". His two best seasons were 1937–38 and 1938–39, during which he led his team, called the "Five Smart Boys", to consecutive state titles. Roanoke finished the 1937–38 season 19–2, and the next season 21–3. In 1939, Roanoke gained an appearance in the 1939 National Invitation Tournament (NIT) at Madison Square Garden, although it lost in the first round to St. John's. In 1942, White left Roanoke to serve in World War II and was succeeded as coach by Buddy Hackman.

After being discharged as a major in 1945, he was named head basketball coach and assistant athletic director at Gonzaga. During his season at Gonzaga, White tallied a mark of 6–14 (.300). In 1946, Claude McGrath, who had been head coach from 1933 to 1942, returned from military service and resumed the head coaching position.

== Head coaching record ==
=== Football ===
Year	Team	Overall	Conference	Standing	Bowl/playoffs
Roanoke Maroons (Virginia Conference) (1930–1935)
1930	Roanoke	3–4–2	3–2–2	4th	
1931	Roanoke	5–4	2–3	T–4th	
1932	Roanoke	4–5	2–3	5th	
1933	Roanoke	4–5	0–3	4th	
1934	Roanoke	5–5	1–2	T–3rd	
1935	Roanoke	4–5	1–2	T–3rd	
Roanoke Maroons (Independent) (1936–1941)
1936	Roanoke	6–2–1			
1937	Roanoke	6–4			
1938	Roanoke	5–2–3			
1939	Roanoke	4–4			
1940	Roanoke	2–6			
1941	Roanoke	3–5			
Roanoke:		51–51–6	9–15–2		
Total:		51–51–6			
