= Jas Dadley =

English footballer

Personal information
- Full name: Benjamin James Dadley
- Date of birth: 1 June 1898
- Place of birth: Great Baddow, England
- Date of death: 18 January 1962 (aged 63)
- Place of death: Carshalton, England
- Position: Left half

Youth career
- Croydon Juniors

Senior career*
Years	Team	Apps	(Gls)
1921–1922	Charlton Athletic	8	(0)
- Chatham
- * Club domestic league appearances and goals

Benjamin James Dadley (1 June 1898 – 18 January 1962) was an English professional footballer who played in the Football League for Charlton Athletic as an inside right. His style of play was characterised as "play hard, tackle hard and only knows defeat when the final whistle has sounded".

== Personal life ==
Dadley served in the 22nd Battalion of the London Regiment during the First World War and saw action on the Western Front and in Palestine. In the 1939 National Register, he was described as a carpenter and joiner living with wife Edith in Fellowes Road, Carshalton.

== Career statistics ==
Appearances and goals by club, season and competition
Club	Season	League			FA Cup		Total	
Club	Season	Division	Apps	Goals	Apps	Goals	Apps	Goals
Charlton Athletic	1921–22	Third Division South	8	0	0	0	8	0
Career total			8	0	0	0	8	0
