= Perry Ten Eyck =

American basketball coach

Perry Steele Ten Eyck (September 20, 1907 – August 17, 1959) was a college basketball coach, the head coach at Gonzaga University for the 1932–33 season. A 6 ft 5 in (1.96 m) forward and center, he was the captain of the Golden Bears basketball team at the University of California under head coach Nibs Price.

After offering a ride to two hitchhikers in California in 1959, Ten Eyck was found beaten to death near Ukiah.
