= Charles Henry (basketball) =

Charles Henry was the head coach for the Gonzaga University men's basketball team for the 1943-44 season. While at Gonzaga, he acquired a record of 22-4 (.846).
