= Bill Frazier =

American basketball coach (1908–2000)

William Harry Frasier (May 5, 1908 – March 31, 2000) was the head coach for the Gonzaga University men's basketball team for the 1942–1943 season. While at Gonzaga University, he acquired a record of 15–15.

Frazier was born and raised in Moscow, Idaho. He played basketball, baseball and football in high school there. He then attended the University of Idaho for a year. After that he served as quarterback on the football team of Gonzaga University.

In 1933 Frazier became head football coach at Mead High School. He worked there until 1939 when he was hired by Gonzaga High School to work on both the football and basketball coaching staffs.
