= Eugene Wozny =

American college basketball coach (1915–1972)

Biographical details
- Born: 1915
- Died: 1972 (aged 56–57)

Playing career
- 1936–1937: Marquette

Coaching career (HC unless noted)
- 1944–1945: Gonzaga

Head coaching record
- Overall: 12–19

Eugene X. Wozny (1915–1972) was an American college basketball coach. He served as the head basketball coach at Gonzaga University in Spokane, Washington for one season, in 1944–45, compiling a record of 12–19 (.387). Wozny played college basketball at Marquette University, lettering in 1936–37.
