= Edward Geheves =

Basketball coach

Edward Geheves was the head coach for the Gonzaga University men's basketball team during the 1918-1920 seasons. While at Gonzaga, he acquired a record of 9-17 (.346).
