= L. T. Underwood =

Biographical details
- Born: December 13, 1902
- Died: July 13, 1997 (aged 94); Bellevue, Washington, U.S.

Playing career

Basketball
- 1923–1926: Kentucky
- Position: Forward / center

Coaching career (HC unless noted)

Basketball
- 1930–1932: Transylvania
- 1949–1951: Gonzaga

Baseball
- 1949–1950: Gonzaga

Head coaching record
- Overall: 26–33 (basketball, at Gonzaga)

Lovell T. "Bill" Underwood (December 13, 1902 – July 13, 1997) was a college basketball coach, the head coach at Gonzaga University for two seasons, from 1949 to 1951, with an overall record of 26–33 (.441). Underwood resigned as head basketball coach in March 1951, and was succeeded by Hank Anderson, who stayed for 21 years.

Underwood was a high school basketball All-American in 1922 in Lexington, Kentucky. He earned three letters in basketball at the University of Kentucky in Lexington in 1924, 1925, and 1926. He coached at Transylvania University in Lexington in the early 1930s and moved west to Yakima, Washington, in 1938, where he resided when he was hired by Gonzaga in May 1949. He was also the Gonzaga Bulldogs baseball coach from 1949 to 1950.

Underwood stayed in Spokane and was an administrator in the county school system; he became the Spokane chapter manager of the Red Cross in 1959. He later served with the organization in Japan. Underwood died in Bellevue in 1997 at age 94.

== Head coaching record ==
=== Basketball ===
Record table
Season	Team	Overall	Conference	Standing	Postseason
Gonzaga Bulldogs (Independent) (1949–1951)
1949–50	Gonzaga	18–11			
1950–51	Gonzaga	8–22			
Gonzaga:		26–33 (.441)			
Total:		26–33 (.441)			
National champion Postseason invitational champion Conference regular season champion Conference regular season and conference tournament champion Division regular season champion Division regular season and conference tournament champion Conference tournament champion
