= Jay Hillock =

American former college basketball coach (born 1949)

Biographical details
- Born: c. 1949 (age 76–77); Indianapolis, Indiana, U.S.
- Education: Gonzaga; Cal Poly

Coaching career (HC unless noted)
- 1975–1979: Santa Barbara CC (assistant)
- 1979–1981: Gonzaga (assistant)
- 1981–1985: Gonzaga
- 1985–1990: Loyola Marymount (assistant)
- 1990–1992: Loyola Marymount

Head coaching record
- Overall: 91–78

Jay Hillock (born c. 1949) is an American former college basketball coach. He was the head coach for six seasons in the West Coast Conference, four at Gonzaga in Spokane and two at Loyola Marymount in Los Angeles. Hillock was an assistant on staff at both programs before the respective promotions to head coach. His career record as a head coach was 91–78 (.538), and an even 39–39 in league play.

== Gonzaga ==
A 1971 graduate of Gonzaga University, Hillock returned to his alma mater in 1979 as an assistant under second-year head coach Dan Fitzgerald. It was GU's first season in the West Coast Athletic Conference, after sixteen years as a charter member of the Big Sky Conference.

When Fitzgerald decided to step down after a 19–8 season in 1981 and concentrate on his duties as athletic director, Hillock was promoted to head coach of the Bulldogs at age 32. His most notable player was guard John Stockton, a first round selection in the 1984 NBA draft and a member of the Basketball Hall of Fame. Hillock's most lauded victory was a one-point upset at DePaul in January 1983, in coaching legend Ray Meyer's uncharacteristic penultimate season. Stockton's senior year in 1984 was Hillock's best in Spokane; the Zags were 17–11 (.607), but only tied for fourth in the conference at 6–6. Without Stockton in 1985, Gonzaga was 15–13 (.536) and fell to fifth place in the WCAC at 4–8.

Shortly after the 1985 season ended, Hillock voluntarily resigned and Fitzgerald returned as head coach. Hillock's overall record at Gonzaga was 60–50 (.545), but was 22–28 (.440) in conference and the Bulldogs' best finish was a tie for fourth.

== Loyola Marymount ==
Within three weeks of his resignation at Gonzaga, Hillock accepted an assistant's job at Loyola Marymount in Los Angeles, originally under newly-hired head coach Jim Lynam, who soon left for an assistant's job in the NBA in June and never coached a game. Surprisingly, Hillock indicated he was interested in the open position, but LMU hired former NBA head coach Paul Westhead, who retained him as an assistant. (Hillock had lost only once to LMU in eight meetings while head coach at Gonzaga.)

Led by Hank Gathers and Bo Kimble in 1990, they went 13–1 (.929) in the WCC, but following Gathers' tragic death during the conference tournament, its remainder was canceled and LMU took the WCC champions' slot in the NCAA Tournament. Despite being seeded 11th in the West region, the inspired Lions won three games and advanced to the Elite Eight. There they fell by thirty points to UNLV, the eventual national champion, and finished at 26–6 (.813). Westhead left for the Denver Nuggets of the NBA that September, and Hillock was promoted to head coach of the Lions. He was 31–28 (.525) in two seasons, with a conference record of 17–11 (.607), but lost in the first round of the conference tournament in both seasons. The following two years, the Lions finished in last place in the WCC.

== After coaching ==
Hillock later worked for various teams in the NBA as a scout and in front office positions.

== Head coaching record ==
Record table
| Season | Team | Overall | Conference | Standing | Postseason |
|---|---|---|---|---|---|
Gonzaga Bulldogs (West Coast Athletic Conference) (1981–1985)
| 1981–82 | Gonzaga | 15–12 | 7–7 | T–4th | |
| 1982–83 | Gonzaga | 13–14 | 5–7 | T–4th | |
| 1983–84 | Gonzaga | 17–11 | 6–6 | T–4th | |
| 1984–85 | Gonzaga | 15–13 | 4–8 | 5th | |
| Gonzaga: | | 60–50 | 22–28 | | |
Loyola Marymount Lions (West Coast Conference) (1990–1992)
| 1990–91 | Loyola Marymount | 16–15 | 9–5 | 2nd | |
| 1991–92 | Loyola Marymount | 15–13 | 8–6 | 3rd | |
| Loyola Marymount: | | 31–28 | 17–11 | | |
| Total: | | 91–78 | | | |

- West Coast Athletic Conference was renamed West Coast Conference in summer 1989.
