= Sam Dagley =

American basketball coach (1902–1968)

Samuel Adrian Dagley (November 4, 1902 – March 17, 1968) was the head coach for the Gonzaga University men's basketball team for the 1931–32 season. While at Gonzaga, he accrued a record of 4–7 (.364).
