= Ed Mulholland =

American basketball player and coach

Edward J. Mulholland was an American basketball player and coach. He was the head coach for the Gonzaga University men's basketball team during the 1912–13 season, his junior year at the school in which he also played for the team. His record at Gonzaga stands at 4–2 (.667). Mulholland also played for the school's football and baseball teams.
