= Jimmy Condon =

American football and basketball player and coach (1897–1945)

Biographical details
- Born: August 6, 1897
- Died: September 8, 1945 (aged 48); Spokane, Washington, U.S.

Playing career

Football
- 1915–1917: Gonzaga
- 1918–1920: Creighton

Basketball
- 1917–1918: Gonzaga

Baseball
- 1916–1918: Gonzaga
- Positions: Fullback, halfback (football); Forward (basketball)

Coaching career (HC unless noted)

Football
- 1917: Gonzaga

Basketball
- 1917–1918: Gonzaga

Baseball
- 1918: Gonzaga

Head coaching record
- Overall: 3–0 (football); 3–2 (basketball)

James Richard Condon Sr. (August 6, 1897 – September 8, 1945), known as Jimmy and Jimmie, was an American college football, college basketball, and college baseball player and coach and later a physician. He played football, basketball, and baseball at Gonzaga University in Spokane, Washington and served as volunteer coach in all three sports during the 1917–18 academic year. After graduating from Gonzaga in 1918, Condon moved on to Creighton University in Omaha, Nebraska, where he studied medicine and played football as a fullback under head coach Tommy Mills from 1918 to 1920.

Condon attended Gonzaga High School—now known as Gonzaga Preparatory School—in Spokane, graduating in 1914. He received a medical degree from Creighton in 1923 and returned to Spokane in 1925 to begin a medical practice. Condon died of a heart attack on September 8, 1945, at his home in Spokane.

== Head coaching record ==
=== Football ===
Year	Team	Overall	Conference	Standing	Bowl/playoffs
Gonzaga Blue and White (Independent) (1917)
1917	Gonzaga	3–0			
Gonzaga:		3–0			
Total:		3–0			
