= Claude McGrath =

American college basketball coach

Biographical details
- Born: March 29, 1904; Spokane, Washington, U.S.
- Died: February 24, 1989 (aged 84); Spokane, Washington, U.S.
- Education: Gonzaga University, 1929

Playing career

Football
- 1923–1926: Gonzaga
- Position: Quarterback

Coaching career (HC unless noted)

Basketball
- 1933–1942: Gonzaga
- 1946–1949: Gonzaga

Administrative career (AD unless noted)
- 1939–1942: Gonzaga
- 1946–1949: Gonzaga

Claude F. McGrath (March 29, 1904 – February 24, 1989) was a college basketball coach and athletic director at Gonzaga University in Spokane, Washington. He was the head coach of the Bulldogs from 1933 to 1942. McGrath served in the military during World War II and returned to Gonzaga in 1946 for three seasons. His overall record as head coach stands at 129-133 (.492).

Born in Spokane in 1904, McGrath was a four-sport athlete at North Central High School and graduated in 1923. He initially attended the University of Idaho in Moscow to play college football as a quarterback for the Vandals under head coach Matty Mathews. He soon returned to Spokane and enrolled at Gonzaga, where he played football under head coaches Gus Dorais and Clipper Smith.

McGrath graduated in 1929 and taught at Mead High School, where he became principal and later the superintendent of the school district. He coached multiple sports at both Mead High and Gonzaga University and became the Bulldogs' head basketball coach in 1933 and added the duties of athletic director in 1939. McGrath spent over three years in the U.S. Army Air Forces as an athletic trainer in the Second Air Force and was discharged as a major. He returned to Gonzaga in 1946, then resigned both positions after three seasons in April 1949 to work in the private sector.

McGrath later became a purchasing agent for the Spokane school district in the late 1950s, and retired in 1969. He died in Spokane at age 84 in February 1989.
