= Dan Fitzgerald =

American college basketball player

Biographical details
- Born: March 3, 1942; San Francisco, California, U.S.
- Died: January 19, 2010 (aged 67); Spokane, Washington, U.S.
- Education: Cal State, Los Angeles

Coaching career (HC unless noted)
- 196x–1968: Daniel Murphy HS (JV)
- 1968–1971: Archbishop Mitty HS
- 1971–1972: Santa Clara (freshmen)
- 1972–1974: Gonzaga (assistant)
- 1975–1978: Santa Clara (assistant)
- 1978–1981: Gonzaga
- 1985–1997: Gonzaga

Administrative career (AD unless noted)
- 1978–1997: Gonzaga

Head coaching record
- Overall: 252–171 (.596)
- Tournaments: 0–1 (NCAA Division I); 1–2 (NIT)

Accomplishments and honors

Championships
- WCC tournament (1995); 2 WCC regular season (1994, 1996)

Awards
- 2× WCC Coach of the Year (1981, 1994); State of Washington Sports Hall of Fame

Daniel John Fitzgerald (March 3, 1942 – January 19, 2010) was an American college basketball coach and athletic director at Gonzaga University in Spokane, Washington.

Fitzgerald was the head coach at Gonzaga for 15 seasons between 1978 and 1997 (except for 1981 to 1985) with an overall record of 252–171 (.596). He led the Bulldogs to their first appearance in the NCAA tournament in 1995, after leading them to their first post-season tournament, the National Invitation Tournament (NIT) in 1994, where they won at Stanford in the first round. They had narrowly missed an NIT selection the previous two seasons. Gonzaga returned to the NIT in 1996.

Among his recruits was future Basketball Hall of Fame member John Stockton, out of Gonzaga Prep in 1980. Fitzgerald was also responsible for hiring coaches Mark Few, Dan Monson, and Bill Grier to Gonzaga. His win total was a school record until Few passed him in 2009.

Prior to his hiring in April 1978, Fitzgerald was an assistant coach for three seasons at Santa Clara, with a previous two-year stint as an assistant at Gonzaga under Adrian Buoncristiani, a high school teammate whom Fitzgerald ultimately succeeded. In between, he worked in the private sector for a year. At Gonzaga, his first season as head coach was their final year in the Big Sky Conference. Shortly after his arrival in Spokane, "Fitz" stated he was a strong proponent of moving out of the Big Sky to the WCAC. After becoming part-owner of the Spokane Indians, athletic director (and former baseball coach) Larry Koentopp resigned in the fall of 1978 and Fitzgerald took on the AD position as well.

Following his third year as head coach, Fitzgerald stepped down in 1981 to focus his efforts as athletic director and hired assistant and GU alumnus Jay Hillock as head coach. Hillock resigned after four seasons in April 1985 and Fitzgerald returned to coach the Bulldogs. After making it to the NCAA Tournament a decade later, he announced in 1995 that he planned to coach two more seasons and promote Monson, a GU assistant since 1988, to head coach.

After 19 years as athletic director, Fitzgerald resigned in December 1997, and was succeeded by Mike Roth. Fitzgerald then worked in private business in the Spokane area. He died in Spokane at age 67 after an apparent heart attack on January 19, 2010.

Fitzgerald was also responsible for Gonzaga being put on four years of probation for keeping an illegal slush fund for recruiting purposes, hiding almost $200,000 from the NCAA. The NCAA investigators agreed that Gonzaga did not gain a competitive advantage from use of the money, since the totals spent on recruiting fell within NCAA guidelines.

Born in San Francisco, California, Fitzgerald went to high school at St. Ignatius and graduated in 1959, then attended college at Santa Clara and San Francisco State, and graduated from Cal State, Los Angeles. Prior to coaching at the college level, Fitzgerald was a high school coach and English teacher in California at Daniel Murphy (St. John Vianney) in Los Angeles and Archbishop Mitty (1968–1971) in San Jose.

== Head coaching record ==
Record table
Season	Team	Overall	Conference	Standing	Postseason
Gonzaga Bulldogs (Big Sky) (1978–1979)
1978–79	Gonzaga	16–10	7–7	T-4th	
Gonzaga Bulldogs (WCAC) (1979–1981)
1979–80	Gonzaga	14–13	10–6	T-3rd	
1980–81	Gonzaga	19–8	9–5	3rd	
Gonzaga Bulldogs (WCAC/WCC) (1985–1997)
1985–86	Gonzaga	15–13	8–6	4th	
1986–87	Gonzaga	18–10	9–5	2nd	
1987–88	Gonzaga	16–12	7–7	5th	
1988–89	Gonzaga	14–14	5–9	6th	
1989–90	Gonzaga	8–20	3–11	8th	
1990–91	Gonzaga	14–14	5–9	6th	
1991–92	Gonzaga	20–10	8–6	T-3rd	
1992–93	Gonzaga	19–9	11–3	2nd	
1993–94	Gonzaga	22–8	12–2	1st	NIT Second Round
1994–95	Gonzaga	21–9	7–7	4th	NCAA Division I First Round
1995–96	Gonzaga	21–9	10–4	T-1st	NIT First Round
1996–97	Gonzaga	15–12	8–6	T-4th	
Gonzaga:		252–171 (.596)	119–93 (.514)		
Total:		252–171 (.596)			
National champion Postseason invitational champion Conference regular season champion Conference regular season and conference tournament champion Division regular season champion Division regular season and conference tournament champion Conference tournament champion

- West Coast Athletic Conference was renamed West Coast Conference in summer 1989.
