= 1967–68 Weber State Wildcats men's basketball team =

American college basketball season

1967–68 Weber State Wildcats men's basketball

Big Sky Champions

NCAA tournament, First round
- Conference: Big Sky Conference
- Record: 21–6 (12–3 Big Sky)
- Head coach: Dick Motta (8th season)
- Assistant coach: Phil Johnson
- Home arena: Wildcat Gym

1967–68 Big Sky men's basketball standings
	Conf.				Overall
Team	W		L	PCT	W		L	PCT
Weber State	12	–	3	.800	21	–	6	.778
Idaho	9	–	3	.750	15	–	11	.577
Idaho State	7	–	8	.467	13	–	13	.500
Montana State	6	–	9	.400	10	–	15	.400
Gonzaga	6	–	9	.400	9	–	17	.346
Montana	5	–	10	.333	8	–	17	.320

The 1967–68 Weber State Wildcats men's basketball team represented Weber State College during the 1967–68 NCAA University Division basketball season. Members of the Big Sky Conference, the Wildcats were led by eighth-year head coach Dick Motta and played their home games on campus at Wildcat Gym in Ogden, Utah. They were 21–5 in the regular season and 12–3 in conference play.

Weber State won the Big Sky title and gained the conference's first-ever berth in the 23-team NCAA tournament. In the West regional at nearby Salt Lake City, the Wildcats fell by eleven points to New Mexico State.

Motta left in late May to become head coach of the NBA's Chicago Bulls, and assistant Phil Johnson was promoted to head coach of the Wildcats.

== Postseason result ==
Date time, TV	Opponent	Result	Record	Site (attendance) city, state
NCAA Tournament
Sat, March 9*; 9:00 pm	vs. New Mexico State; First round	L 57–68	21–6	Nielsen Fieldhouse (4,700); Salt Lake City, Utah
*Non-conference game. ^{#}Rankings from AP Poll. (#) Tournament seedings in parentheses. All times are in Mountain time.
