= Charlotte Y. Martin Centre =

Athletics center in Spokane, Washington, US

Martin Centre
- The Kennel
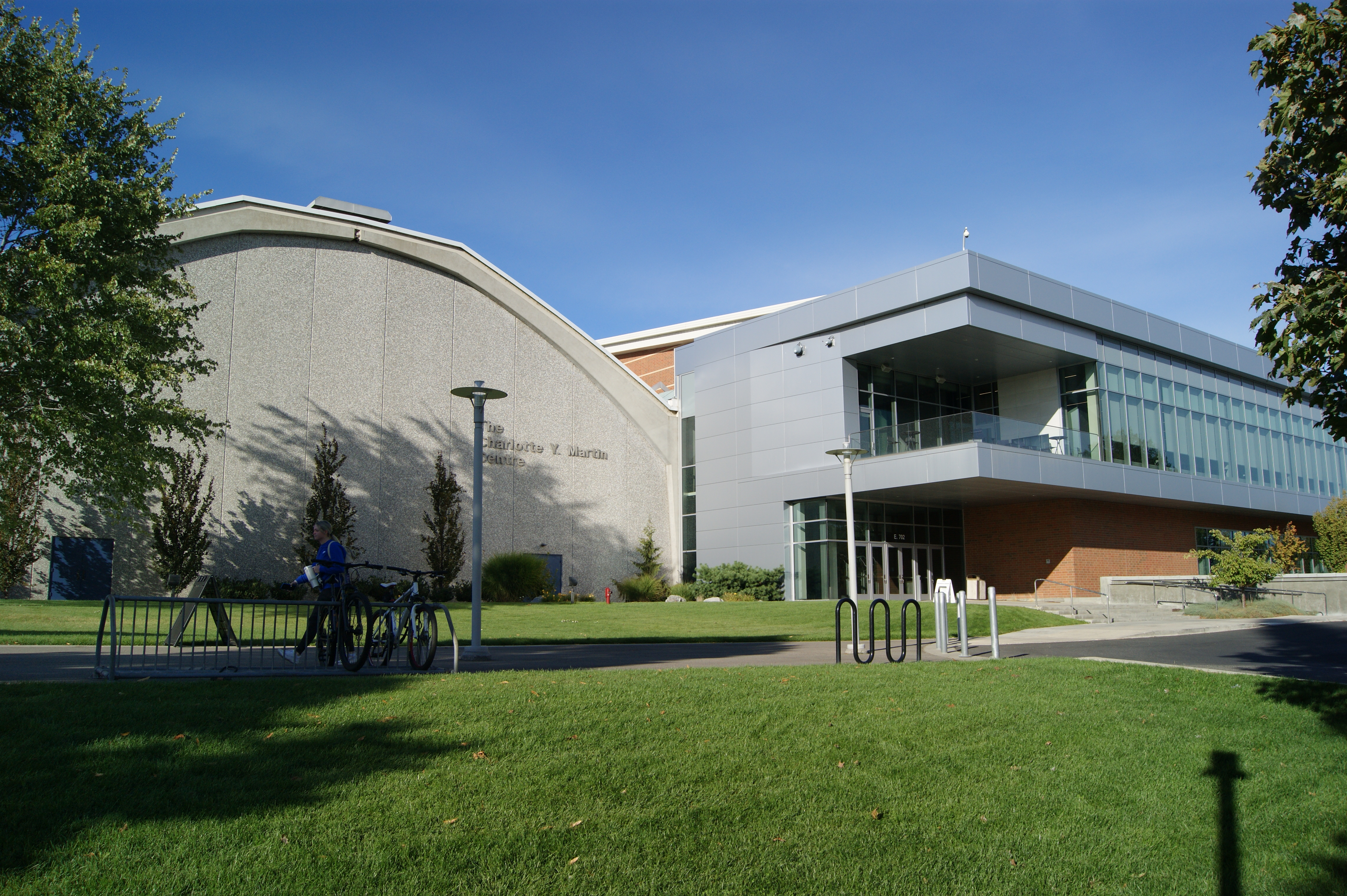
- View from southwest in 2024
- Interactive map of Martin Centre
- Full name: Charlotte Y. Martin Centre
- Former names: John F. Kennedy Memorial Pavilion (1965–1987)
- Location: Gonzaga University; Spokane, Washington
- Coordinates: 47.6655°N 117.4005°W
- Owner: Gonzaga University
- Operator: Gonzaga University
- Capacity: 4,000

Construction
- Groundbreaking: June 3, 1964
- Opened: December 3, 1965; 61 years ago
- Renovated: 1986
- Cost: $1.1 million ($11.2 million in 2025)

Tenants
- Gonzaga Bulldogs (NCAA); Men's basketball (1965–1979, 1980–2004); Women's basketball (until 2004); Women's volleyball

Website
- Martin Centre

Spokane (the United States)
Spokane (Washington (state))

Charlotte Y. Martin Centre is an athletics center in the northwest United States, on the campus of Gonzaga University in Spokane, Washington. Its multi-purpose arena has a seating capacity of 4,000.

Ground was broken in June 1964 on the $1.1 million center, which opened in late 1965 as the John F. Kennedy Memorial Pavilion, with a capacity of 3,800 for basketball, and included a six-lane 25-yard (23 m) swimming pool. The dedication ceremony on November 21 was attended by 6,000 and included the late president's brother, U.S. Senator Ted Kennedy of Massachusetts. The first varsity event on December 3 was a basketball game against Washington State, won by the visiting Cougars 106–78 before an overflow crowd of 4,300.

Charlotte Martin, the daughter-in-law of former governor Clarence D. Martin, donated $4.5 million in 1987 for the renovation of the complex and it was renamed for her as part of Gonzaga's centennial celebrations on March 17. Mrs. Martin died less than eight months later, at age 68.

The Martin Centre is the home court of the women's volleyball team, and was home of men's and women's basketball teams until the fall of 2004, when the adjacent $25 million McCarthey Athletic Center (MAC) opened. An exception was the partial hiatus in the 1979–80 season when the men's team returned to its former home of the Spokane Coliseum for WCAC home games only. The Pavilion was affectionately known as The Kennel, a reference to the enthusiastic capacity crowds for Bulldog basketball, a nickname which transferred to the MAC.

Prior to the Spokane Coliseum's opening in 1955, Gonzaga basketball games were played on campus at "The Cave," a gymnasium in the administration building.

In late 1968, the English rock group Led Zeppelin played their fifth-ever American concert at the Kennedy Pavilion on December 30, opening for Vanilla Fudge and erroneously billed as "Len Zefflin"; the first known bootleg recording of the band originated from this performance. The bands were welcomed to Spokane with frigid sub-zero temperatures.
