= 1971–72 Montana Grizzlies basketball team =

American college basketball season

1971–72 Montana Grizzlies men's basketball
- Conference: Big Sky Conference
- Record: 14–11 (7–7 Big Sky)
- Head coach: Jud Heathcote (1st season)
- Assistant coach: Jim Brandenburg
- Home arena: Dahlberg Arena

1971–72 Big Sky men's basketball standings
| | Conf. | | | | Overall |
| Team | W | | L | PCT | W | | L | PCT |
|---|---|---|---|---|---|---|---|---|
| Weber State | 10 | – | 4 | .714 | 18 | – | 11 | .621 |
| Gonzaga | 8 | – | 6 | .571 | 14 | – | 12 | .538 |
| Northern Arizona | 8 | – | 6 | .571 | 13 | – | 10 | .565 |
| Idaho State | 8 | – | 6 | .571 | 14 | – | 12 | .538 |
| Montana | 7 | – | 7 | .500 | 14 | – | 11 | .560 |
| Boise State | 7 | – | 7 | .500 | 14 | – | 12 | .538 |
| Montana State | 6 | – | 8 | .429 | 9 | – | 16 | .360 |
| Idaho | 2 | – | 12 | .143 | 5 | – | 14 | .263 |

The 1971–72 Montana Grizzlies basketball team represented the University of Montana during the 1971–72 NCAA Division I men's basketball season. Charter members of the Big Sky Conference, the Grizzlies were led by first-year head coach Jud Heathcote and played their home games on campus at Dahlberg Arena in Missoula, Montana. They finished the regular season at 14–11, with a 7–7 conference record.

The Big Sky conference tournament debuted four years later, in 1976.

Heathcote, an assistant at Washington State under Marv Harshman, was hired in March 1971.
