= 1971–72 Boise State Broncos men's basketball team =

American college basketball season

1971–72 Boise State Broncos men's basketball
- Conference: Big Sky Conference
- Record: 14–12 (7–7 Big Sky)
- Head coach: Murray Satterfield (7th season)
- Assistant coach: Bus Connor
- Home arena: Bronco Gymnasium

1971–72 Big Sky men's basketball standings
	Conf.				Overall
Team	W		L	PCT	W		L	PCT
Weber State	10	–	4	.714	18	–	11	.621
Gonzaga	8	–	6	.571	14	–	12	.538
Northern Arizona	8	–	6	.571	13	–	10	.565
Idaho State	8	–	6	.571	14	–	12	.538
Montana	7	–	7	.500	14	–	11	.560
Boise State	7	–	7	.500	14	–	12	.538
Montana State	6	–	8	.429	9	–	16	.360
Idaho	2	–	12	.143	5	–	14	.263

The 1971–72 Boise State Broncos men's basketball team represented Boise State College during the 1971–72 NCAA University Division men's basketball season. The Broncos were led by seventh-year head coach Murray Satterfield, and played their home games on campus at Bronco Gymnasium in Boise, Idaho.

They finished the regular season at 14–12 overall, with a 7–7 record in the Big Sky Conference, tied for fifth in the standings.

No Broncos were named to the all-conference team, though four were honorable mention: guard Booker Brown and forwards Greg Bunn, Bill Cottrell, and Steve Wallace.

There was no conference tournament, which debuted four years later in 1976.

== See also ==
- 1971–72 NCAA University Division men's basketball season
- 1971 in sports
