= 1971–72 Idaho State Bengals men's basketball team =

American college basketball season

1971–72 Idaho State Bengals men's basketball
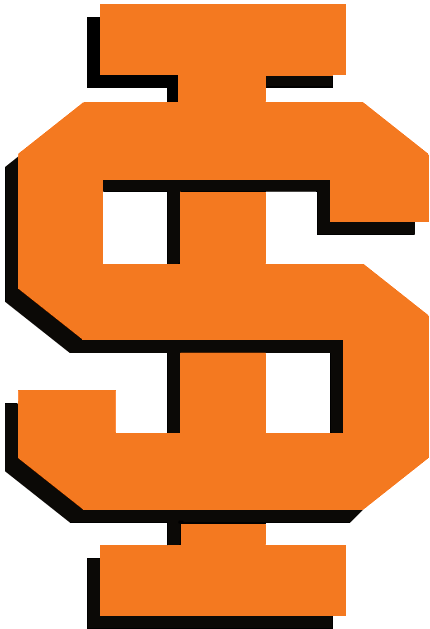
- Conference: Big Sky Conference
- Record: 14–12 (8–6 Big Sky)
- Head coach: Jim Killingsworth (1st season)
- Home arena: ISU Minidome

1971–72 Big Sky men's basketball standings
	Conf.				Overall
Team	W		L	PCT	W		L	PCT
Weber State	10	–	4	.714	18	–	11	.621
Gonzaga	8	–	6	.571	14	–	12	.538
Northern Arizona	8	–	6	.571	13	–	10	.565
Idaho State	8	–	6	.571	14	–	12	.538
Montana	7	–	7	.500	14	–	11	.560
Boise State	7	–	7	.500	14	–	12	.538
Montana State	6	–	8	.429	9	–	16	.360
Idaho	2	–	12	.143	5	–	14	.263

The 1971–72 Idaho State Bengals men's basketball team represented Idaho State University during the 1971–72 NCAA University Division basketball season. Led by first-year head coach Jim Killingsworth, the Bengals played their home games on campus at the ISU Minidome in Pocatello.

Idaho State finished the regular season at 14–12 overall, with a 8–6 record in the Big Sky Conference, runner-up to champion Weber State. The conference tournament debuted four years later, in 1976.

Junior center Ev Fopma was named to the all-conference team; junior guard Edison Hicks was on the second team, while guard Jerry Sabins, forward Mike Solliday, and forward Nick Ysusra were honorable mention.

On Saturday, March 11, the two-year-old Minidome hosted a pair of first-round games in the West regional of the 25-team NCAA tournament.
