= 1975–76 Boise State Broncos men's basketball team =

American college basketball season

1975–76 Boise State Broncos men's basketball
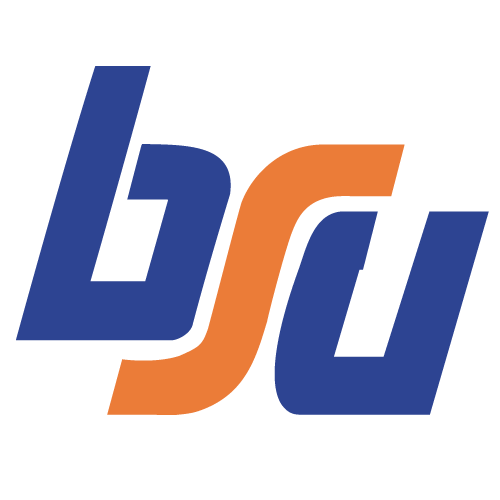

Big Sky regular season co-champions Big Sky tournament champions

NCAA tournament, First round
- Conference: Big Sky Conference
- Record: 18–11 (9–5 Big Sky)
- Head coach: Bus Connor (3rd season)
- Assistant coaches: Burt Golden (3rd season); Mike Montgomery (3rd season)
- Home arena: Bronco Gym

1975–76 Big Sky men's basketball standings
	Conf.				Overall
Team	W		L	PCT	W		L	PCT
Weber State	9	–	5	.643	21	–	11	.656
Boise State †	9	–	5	.643	18	–	11	.621
Idaho State	9	–	5	.643	16	–	11	.593
Northern Arizona	8	–	6	.571	15	–	12	.556
Montana	7	–	7	.500	13	–	12	.520
Montana State	6	–	8	.429	9	–	16	.360
Gonzaga	5	–	9	.357	13	–	13	.500
Idaho	3	–	11	.214	7	–	19	.269
† Big Sky Conference tournament winner

The 1975–76 Boise State Broncos men's basketball team represented Boise State University during the 1975–76 NCAA Division I men's basketball season. The Broncos were led by third-year head coach Bus Connor and played their home games on campus at the Bronco Gym in Boise, Idaho.

They finished the regular season at 16–10 overall, with a 9–5 record in the Big Sky Conference, tied with Weber State and Idaho State for the regular season title. The Broncos were led on the court by senior center Pat Hoke and sophomore guard Steve Connor, the coach's son.

No Broncos were named to the all-conference team; Hoke and Connor were on the second team, and senior guard Terry Miller was honorable mention.

In the first year of the conference tournament, the Broncos defeated the other co-champions: Idaho State in the first round, and host Weber State in the final in double overtime. They advanced to the NCAA tournament, their first in Division I; six years earlier in 1970, they had advanced to the College Division tournament (now Division II).

Boise State met fourth-ranked UNLV in the first round at McArthur Court in Eugene, Oregon; the Runnin' Rebels were up by nine points at the half, and won by 25 points, 103–78. The Broncos' next NCAA appearance was twelve years later, in 1988.

== Postseason results ==
Date time, TV	Opponent	Result	Record	Site (attendance) city, state
Big Sky tournament
Fri, March 5; 9:00 pm	vs. Idaho State; Semifinal	W 93–81	17–10	Wildcat Gym (4,411); Ogden, Utah
Sat, March 6; 8:00 pm	at Weber State; Final	W 77–70 ^{2OT}	18–10	Wildcat Gym (4,679); Ogden, Utah
NCAA tournament
Sat, March 13*; 8:05 pm	vs. No. 4 UNLV; First round	L 78–103	18–11	McArthur Court (9,100); Eugene, Oregon
*Non-conference game. ^{#}Rankings from AP Poll. (#) Tournament seedings in parentheses. All times are in Mountain time.
