= 1972–73 Boise State Broncos men's basketball team =

American college basketball season

1972–73 Boise State Broncos men's basketball
- Conference: Big Sky Conference
- Record: 11–15 (5–9 Big Sky)
- Head coach: Murray Satterfield (8th season)
- Assistant coach: Bus Connor (5–7 as head coach)
- Home arena: Bronco Gymnasium

1972–73 Big Sky men's basketball standings
	Conf.				Overall
Team	W		L	PCT	W		L	PCT
Weber State	13	–	1	.929	20	–	7	.741
Idaho State	10	–	4	.714	18	–	8	.692
Montana State	9	–	5	.643	17	–	10	.630
Montana	7	–	7	.500	13	–	13	.500
Gonzaga	6	–	8	.429	14	–	12	.538
Boise State	5	–	9	.357	11	–	15	.423
Idaho	3	–	11	.214	7	–	19	.269
Northern Arizona	3	–	11	.214	6	–	20	.231

The 1972–73 Boise State Broncos men's basketball team represented Boise State College during the 1972–73 NCAA University Division men's basketball season. The Broncos were led by eighth-year head coach Murray Satterfield, and played their home games on campus at Bronco Gymnasium in Boise, Idaho.

They finished the regular season at 11–15 overall, with a 5–9 record in the Big Sky Conference, sixth in the standings. Satterfield resigned in mid-January when the Broncos were 6–8 (0–2 in Big Sky), and assistant Bus Connor was promoted.

No Broncos were named to the all-conference team. There was no conference tournament, which debuted three years later in 1976.
