= 1978 Big Sky Conference men's basketball tournament =

- Classification: Division I
- Season: 1977–78
- Teams: 4
- Site: Adams Field House; Missoula, Montana
- Champions: Weber State (1st title)
- Winning coach: Neil McCarthy (1st title)
- MVP: Bruce Collins (Weber State)

1977–78 Big Sky men's basketball standings
	Conf.				Overall
Team	W		L	PCT	W		L	PCT
Montana	12	–	2	.857	20	–	8	.714
Idaho State	11	–	3	.786	16	–	10	.615
Weber State †	9	–	5	.643	19	–	10	.655
Boise State	8	–	6	.571	13	–	14	.481
Gonzaga	7	–	7	.500	14	–	15	.483
Northern Arizona	5	–	9	.357	11	–	14	.440
Montana State	3	–	11	.214	9	–	17	.346
Idaho	1	–	13	.071	4	–	22	.154
† Big Sky Conference tournament winner

The 1978 Big Sky Conference men's basketball tournament was held March 3–4 at Adams Field House at the University of Montana in Missoula, Montana.

Weber State upset top-seeded Montana in the championship game, 62–55 (in overtime), to clinch their first conference tournament title. the first of three consecutive. They had lost in the final in the first two editions. The end of regulation time saw the teams tied at 49 points each; host Montana missed a potential winning free throw with seconds left.

== Format ==
First played in 1976, the Big Sky tournament had the same format for its first eight editions. The regular season champion hosted and only the top four teams from the standings took part, with seeding based on regular season conference records.

Montana made its inaugural appearance, not having qualified as a top-four team in either of the previous two years.

== Bracket ==
Semifinals; Friday, March 3
1	Montana	70
4	Boise State	61
3	Weber State	84
2	Idaho State	79

Championship; Saturday, March 4
1	Montana	55
3	Weber State	62*

== NCAA tournament ==
Weber State received an automatic bid to the 32-team NCAA tournament, but lost in the first round to Arkansas in Eugene, Oregon; Arkansas ultimately advanced to the Final Four. It was the Wildcats' first NCAA appearance in five years, since they went to six consecutive (1968–1973).
