= 1972–73 Montana Grizzlies basketball team =

American college basketball season

1972–73 Montana Grizzlies men's basketball
- Conference: Big Sky Conference
- Record: 13–13 (7–7 Big Sky)
- Head coach: Jud Heathcote (2nd season)
- Assistant coach: Jim Brandenburg
- Home arena: Dahlberg Arena

1972–73 Big Sky men's basketball standings
	Conf.				Overall
Team	W		L	PCT	W		L	PCT
Weber State	13	–	1	.929	20	–	7	.741
Idaho State	10	–	4	.714	18	–	8	.692
Montana State	9	–	5	.643	17	–	10	.630
Montana	7	–	7	.500	13	–	13	.500
Gonzaga	6	–	8	.429	14	–	12	.538
Boise State	5	–	9	.357	11	–	15	.423
Idaho	3	–	11	.214	7	–	19	.269
Northern Arizona	3	–	11	.214	6	–	20	.231

The 1972–73 Montana Grizzlies basketball team represented the University of Montana during the 1972–73 NCAA Division I men's basketball season. Charter members of the Big Sky Conference, the Grizzlies were led by second-year head coach Jud Heathcote and played their home games on campus at Dahlberg Arena in Missoula, Montana. They finished the regular season at 13–13, with a 7–7 conference record.

The Big Sky conference tournament debuted three years later, in 1976.

Senior guard Mike Murray was named to the all-conference team and was the conference runner-up in scoring.
