= 1972–73 Idaho State Bengals men's basketball team =

American college basketball season

1972–73 Idaho State Bengals men's basketball
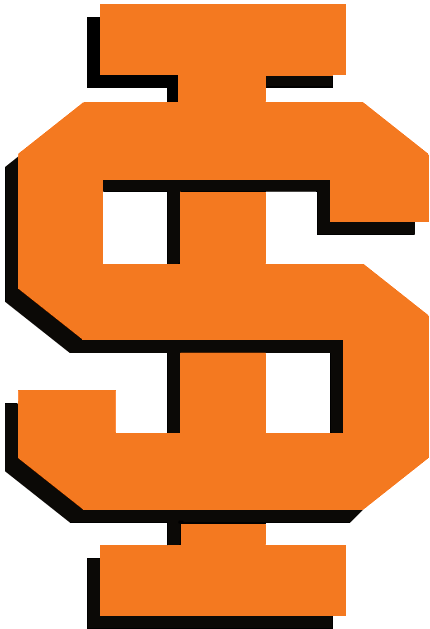
- Conference: Big Sky Conference
- Record: 18–8 (10–4 Big Sky)
- Head coach: Jim Killingsworth (2nd season)
- Home arena: ISU Minidome

1972–73 Big Sky men's basketball standings
	Conf.				Overall
Team	W		L	PCT	W		L	PCT
Weber State	13	–	1	.929	20	–	7	.741
Idaho State	10	–	4	.714	18	–	8	.692
Montana State	9	–	5	.643	17	–	10	.630
Montana	7	–	7	.500	13	–	13	.500
Gonzaga	6	–	8	.429	14	–	12	.538
Boise State	5	–	9	.357	11	–	15	.423
Idaho	3	–	11	.214	7	–	19	.269
Northern Arizona	3	–	11	.214	6	–	20	.231

The 1972–73 Idaho State Bengals men's basketball team represented Idaho State University during the 1972–73 NCAA University Division basketball season. Led by second-year head coach Jim Killingsworth, the Bengals played their home games on campus at the ISU Minidome in Pocatello.

Idaho State finished the regular season at 18–8 overall, with a 10–4 record in the Big Sky Conference, runner-up to champion Weber State. The conference tournament debuted three years later, in 1976.

Senior forward Ev Fopma was named to the all-conference team, and senior guard Edison Hicks was on the second team.
