= 1972–73 Idaho Vandals men's basketball team =

American college basketball season

1972–73 Idaho Vandals men's basketball
- Conference: Big Sky Conference
- Record: 7–19 (3–11 Big Sky)
- Head coach: Wayne Anderson (7th season)
- Home arena: Memorial Gymnasium

1972–73 Big Sky men's basketball standings
| | Conf. | | | | Overall |
| Team | W | | L | PCT | W | | L | PCT |
|---|---|---|---|---|---|---|---|---|
| Weber State | 13 | – | 1 | .929 | 20 | – | 7 | .741 |
| Idaho State | 10 | – | 4 | .714 | 18 | – | 8 | .692 |
| Montana State | 9 | – | 5 | .643 | 17 | – | 10 | .630 |
| Montana | 7 | – | 7 | .500 | 13 | – | 13 | .500 |
| Gonzaga | 6 | – | 8 | .429 | 14 | – | 12 | .538 |
| Boise State | 5 | – | 9 | .357 | 11 | – | 15 | .423 |
| Idaho | 3 | – | 11 | .214 | 7 | – | 19 | .269 |
| Northern Arizona | 3 | – | 11 | .214 | 6 | – | 20 | .231 |

The 1972–73 Idaho Vandals men's basketball team represented the University of Idaho during the 1972–73 NCAA University Division basketball season. Members of the Big Sky Conference, the Vandals were led by seventh-year head coach Wayne Anderson and played their home games on campus at the Memorial Gymnasium in Moscow, Idaho. They were 7–19 overall and 3–11 in conference play.

No Vandals were named to the all-conference team; junior forward Steve Ton, junior guard Tyrone Fitzpatrick, and freshman guard Steve Weist were honorable mention. Weist was brought up from the freshman team in late January.
