= 1977–78 Montana State Bobcats men's basketball team =

American college basketball season

1977–78 Montana State Bobcats men's basketball
- Conference: Big Sky Conference
- Record: 10-16 (4-10 Big Sky)
- Head coach: Rich Juarez (4th season)
- Home arena: Brick Breeden Fieldhouse

1977–78 Big Sky men's basketball standings
	Conf.				Overall
Team	W		L	PCT	W		L	PCT
Montana	12	–	2	.857	20	–	8	.714
Idaho State	11	–	3	.786	16	–	10	.615
Weber State †	9	–	5	.643	19	–	10	.655
Boise State	8	–	6	.571	13	–	14	.481
Gonzaga	7	–	7	.500	14	–	15	.483
Northern Arizona	5	–	9	.357	11	–	14	.440
Montana State	3	–	11	.214	9	–	17	.346
Idaho	1	–	13	.071	4	–	22	.154
† Big Sky Conference tournament winner

The 1977–78 Montana State Bobcats men's basketball team represented Montana State University during the 1977–78 NCAA Division I men's basketball season.

== Roster ==
1977–78 Montana State Bobcats men's basketball team
Players
Coaches

Pos.	#	Name	Height	Weight	Year	Hometown
G	10	Mick Durham	5 ft 10 in (1.78 m)	150 lb (68 kg)	Jr	Three Forks, Montana
G	20	Craig Finberg	6 ft 1 in (1.85 m)	160 lb (73 kg)	Jr	Columbia Falls, Montana
F	40	Lance Freeman	6 ft 6 in (1.98 m)	195 lb (88 kg)	Fr	St. Joseph, Illinois
F	50	Brian Gorski	6 ft 7 in (2.01 m)	190 lb (86 kg)	So	Chicago, Illinois
F	54	Doug Hashley	6 ft 6 in (1.98 m)	210 lb (95 kg)	Fr	Big Sandy, Montana
G	14	Duey Kautzmann	6 ft 1 in (1.85 m)	165 lb (75 kg)	Fr	Billings, Montana
F	34	Bill Malone	6 ft 8 in (2.03 m)	205 lb (93 kg)	So	Sandpoint, Idaho
G	32	Dan Miles	6 ft 1 in (1.85 m)	176 lb (80 kg)	Jr	Columbias, Indiana
C	52	Wayne Peterson	6 ft 10 in (2.08 m)	220 lb (100 kg)	Jr	Three River Falls, Minnesota
G	22	Chris Singleton	6 ft 4 in (1.93 m)	180 lb (82 kg)	Jr	Santa Maria, Cal
C	42	Mike Stanny	6 ft 9 in (2.06 m)	195 lb (88 kg)	So	Hammond, Indiana
G	22	Gary Stokes	6 ft 1 in (1.85 m)	182 lb (83 kg)	Sr	Salmon, Idaho
F	24	Randy Trinastich	6 ft 5 in (1.96 m)	185 lb (84 kg)		Columbia Falls, Montana

Head coach

- Rich Juarez

Assistant coach(es)

Legend

- (C) Team captain
- (S) Suspended
- (I) Ineligible
- (W) Walk-on
- Injured
- Current redshirt

== Schedule ==
Date time, TV	Rank^{#}	Opponent^{#}	Result	Record	Site city, state
November 25*		Stout State	W 73–62	1–0	Brick Breeden Fieldhouse; Bozeman, Montana
November 26*		Seattle Pacific	W 79–74	2–0	Brick Breeden Fieldhouse; Bozeman, Montana
November 29*		at Puget Sound	W 73–68	3–0	
December 8*		at Fresno State	L 68–85	3–1	Selland Arena; Fresno, California
December 10*		at Pacific	L 73–99	3–2	Pacific Pavilion; Stockton, California
December 17*		St. Cloud State	W 101–90	4–2	Brick Breeden Fieldhouse; Bozeman, Montana
December 21*		at St. Joseph	L 83–93	4–3	
December 23*		at Nebraska	L 60–104	4–4	Bob Devaney Sports Center; Lincoln, Nebraska
December 29*		at Eastern Montana	L 77–80	4–5	
December 30*		vs. Kent State	W 84–64	5–5	Rimrock Auto Arena at MetraPark; Billings, Montana
January 6		at Boise State	L 84–86	5–6 (0–1)	Bronco Gym; Boise, Idaho
January 7		at Idaho State	L 80–93	5–7 (0–2)	Holt Arena; Pocatello, Idaho
January 14		Montana	L 58–74	5–8 (0–3)	Brick Breeden Fieldhouse; Bozeman, Montana
January 21		at Montana	L 57–65	5–9 (0–4)	Harry Adams Field House; Missoula, Montana
January 23*		Northern Colorado	W 76–74	6–9 (0–4)	Brick Breeden Fieldhouse; Bozeman, Montana
January 27		at Gonzaga	L 76–91	6–10 (0–5)	Charlotte Y. Martin Centre; Spokane, Washington
January 28		at Idaho	L 84–91	6–11 (0–6)	Kibbie Dome; Moscow, Idaho
February 3		Gonzaga	W 80–78	7–11 (1–6)	Brick Breeden Fieldhouse; Bozeman, Montana
February 4		Idaho	W 66–59	8–11 (2–6)	Brick Breeden Fieldhouse; Bozeman, Montana
February 6*		at Utah State	L 77–93	8–12 (2–6)	Dee Glen Smith Spectrum; Logan, Utah
February 10		Weber State	L 73–83	8–13 (2–7)	Brick Breeden Fieldhouse; Bozeman, Montana
February 11		Northern Arizona	L 67–73	8–14 (2–8)	Brick Breeden Fieldhouse; Bozeman, Montana
February 16		at Weber State	L 80–90	8–15 (2–9)	Dee Events Center; Ogden, Utah
February 18		at Northern Arizona	W 84–83	9–15 (3–9)	Walkup Skydome; Flagstaff, Arizona
February 24		Boise State	W 78–76	10–15 (4–9)	Brick Breeden Fieldhouse; Bozeman, Montana
February 25		Idaho State	L 72–90	10–16 (4–10)	Brick Breeden Fieldhouse; Bozeman, Montana
*Non-conference game. ^{#}Rankings from AP Poll. (#) Tournament seedings in parentheses.
