= 1975–76 Idaho State Bengals men's basketball team =

American college basketball season

1975–76 Idaho State Bengals men's basketball
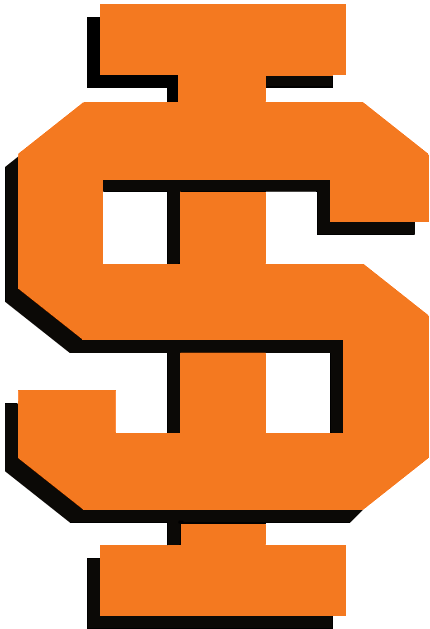

Big Sky regular season co–champions
- Conference: Big Sky Conference
- Record: 16–11 (9–5 Big Sky)
- Head coach: Jim Killingsworth (5th season)
- Home arena: ISU Minidome

1975–76 Big Sky men's basketball standings
	Conf.				Overall
Team	W		L	PCT	W		L	PCT
Weber State	9	–	5	.643	21	–	11	.656
Boise State †	9	–	5	.643	18	–	11	.621
Idaho State	9	–	5	.643	16	–	11	.593
Northern Arizona	8	–	6	.571	15	–	12	.556
Montana	7	–	7	.500	13	–	12	.520
Montana State	6	–	8	.429	9	–	16	.360
Gonzaga	5	–	9	.357	13	–	13	.500
Idaho	3	–	11	.214	7	–	19	.269
† Big Sky Conference tournament winner

The 1975–76 Idaho State Bengals men's basketball team represented Idaho State University during the 1975–76 NCAA Division I men's basketball season.

The Bengals were led by fifth-year head coach Jim Killingsworth and played their home games on campus at the ISU Minidome in Pocatello. They finished the regular season at 16–10 overall, with a 9–5 record in the Big Sky Conference, tied with Weber State and Boise State for the regular season title.

In the first year of the conference tournament, the Bengals lost to Boise State in the first round. The seeding of the three co-champions for the four-team bracket was done by a random draw in late February, conducted via a Saturday night conference telephone call by commissioner John Ronning from Moscow, Idaho. Weber was drawn as the top seed, which included the right to host at Wildcat Gym in Ogden, Utah. At this time, both Weber and Boise still played in small gymnasiums, while ISU's Minidome had about triple the seating capacity of the others; Boise State upset the host in the final.

For a second consecutive year, junior center Steve Hayes was named to the all-conference team, joined by junior forward Greg Griffin; junior guard Ed Thompson was on the second team. Hayes was a unanimous selection.

== Postseason results ==
Date time, TV	Opponent	Result	Record	Site (attendance) city, state
Big Sky tournament
Fri, March 5; 9:00 pm	vs. Boise State; Semifinal	L 81–93	16–11	Wildcat Gym (4,411); Ogden, Utah
*Non-conference game. ^{#}Rankings from AP poll. (#) Tournament seedings in parentheses. All times are in Mountain time.
