= 1972–73 Gonzaga Bulldogs men's basketball team =

American college basketball season

1972–73 Gonzaga Bulldogs men's basketball
- Conference: Big Sky Conference
- Record: 14–12 (6–8 Big Sky)
- Head coach: Adrian Buoncristiani (1st season)
- Assistant coach: Dan Fitzgerald
- Home arena: Kennedy Pavilion

1972–73 Big Sky men's basketball standings
	Conf.				Overall
Team	W		L	PCT	W		L	PCT
Weber State	13	–	1	.929	20	–	7	.741
Idaho State	10	–	4	.714	18	–	8	.692
Montana State	9	–	5	.643	17	–	10	.630
Montana	7	–	7	.500	13	–	13	.500
Gonzaga	6	–	8	.429	14	–	12	.538
Boise State	5	–	9	.357	11	–	15	.423
Idaho	3	–	11	.214	7	–	19	.269
Northern Arizona	3	–	11	.214	6	–	20	.231

The 1972–73 Gonzaga Bulldogs men's basketball team represented Gonzaga University during the 1972–73 NCAA University Division basketball season. Members of the Big Sky Conference, the Bulldogs were led by first-year head coach Adrian Buoncristiani and played their home games on campus at Kennedy Pavilion in Spokane, Washington. They were 14–12 overall and 6–8 in conference play, in fifth place.

Senior forward Greg Sten led the Big Sky in scoring and was selected to the all-conference team; senior forward Joe Clayton was second team and junior center Stewart Morrill was honorable mention.

Previously an assistant coach at UC Santa Barbara. Buoncristiani succeeded Hank Anderson, who left Gonzaga after 21 years as head coach for a similar position at Montana State in Bozeman, a conference rival. Less than a week after accepting the job in April, Buoncristiani was involved in a traffic accident in Spokane in which his car was demolished, but "ABC" escaped with only minor injuries.

== Schedule ==
Date time, TV	Rank^{#}	Opponent^{#}	Result	Record	Site city, state
Dec 1, 1972*		at Eastern Washington	W 88–63	1–0	
Dec 2, 1972*		at North Dakota	W 90–71	2–0	
Dec 5, 1972*		at Washington State	W 54–52	3–0	
Dec 9, 1972*		at Sacramento State	L 58–73	3–1	
Dec 14, 1972*		at Central Washington	W 76–55	4–1	
Dec 16, 1972*		at Whitworth	W 69–45	5–1	
Dec 22, 1972*		at Oregon	L 56–68	5–2	
Dec 23, 1972*		at Washington	L 61–93	5–3	
Jan 5, 1973		at Boise State	W 73–58	6–3	
Jan 6, 1973		at Idaho State	L 63–66	6–4	
Jan 13, 1973*		at Portland	W 76–73	7–4	
Jan 16, 1973*		at Washington State	W 61–52	8–4	
Jan 18, 1973*		at Portland State	W 69–64	9–4	
Jan 20, 1973*		at Puget Sound	L 71–72	9–5	
Jan 26, 1973		at Montana	L 54–57	9–6	
Jan 27, 1973		at Montana State	L 51–73	9–7	
Feb 2, 1973		at Montana	W 60–57	10–7	
Feb 3, 1973		at Montana State	L 71–84	10–8	
Feb 8, 1973		at Northern Arizona	W 70–58	11–8	
Feb 10, 1973		at Weber State	L 60–68	11–9	
Feb 16, 1973		at Northern Arizona	W 99–81	12–9	
Feb 17, 1973		at Weber State	L 65–70	12–10	
Feb 23, 1973		at Boise State	L 85–87	12–11	
Feb 24, 1973		at Idaho State	L 72–74	12–12	
Mar 2, 1973		at Idaho	W 88–82	13–12	
Mar 3, 1973		at Idaho	W 85–75	14–12	
*Non-conference game. ^{#}Rankings from AP Poll. (#) Tournament seedings in parentheses.
