= 1977–78 Idaho Vandals men's basketball team =

American college basketball season

1977–78 Idaho Vandals men's basketball
- Conference: Big Sky Conference
- Record: 4–22 (1–13 Big Sky)
- Head coach: Jim Jarvis (4th season)
- Assistant coach: Wes Sodorff
- MVP: Reed Jaussi
- Home arena: Kibbie Dome

1977–78 Big Sky men's basketball standings
	Conf.				Overall
Team	W		L	PCT	W		L	PCT
Montana	12	–	2	.857	20	–	8	.714
Idaho State	11	–	3	.786	16	–	10	.615
Weber State †	9	–	5	.643	19	–	10	.655
Boise State	8	–	6	.571	13	–	14	.481
Gonzaga	7	–	7	.500	14	–	15	.483
Northern Arizona	5	–	9	.357	11	–	14	.440
Montana State	3	–	11	.214	9	–	17	.346
Idaho	1	–	13	.071	4	–	22	.154
† Big Sky Conference tournament winner

The 1977–78 Idaho Vandals men's basketball team represented the University of Idaho during the 1977–78 NCAA Division I basketball season. Members of the Big Sky Conference, the Vandals were led by fourth-year head coach Jim Jarvis and played their home games on campus at the Kibbie Dome in Moscow, Idaho. They were 4–22 overall and 1–13 in conference play.

No Vandals were named to the all-conference team; sophomore forward Reed Jaussi was honorable mention.

After four seasons with last place finishes in the conference, Jarvis resigned in June 1978 under recurring allegations of illegal recruiting. The program had been placed on probation for one year in late January, resulting in a reprimand for Jarvis and assistant coach Wes Sodorff by the university.

Jarvis was succeeded in August by alumnus Don Monson, an assistant at Michigan State, who had significantly greater success; he led the Vandals to a conference title in 1981 and the NCAA Sweet Sixteen in 1982.
