= 1977–78 Gonzaga Bulldogs men's basketball team =

American college basketball season

1977–78 Gonzaga Bulldogs men's basketball
- Conference: Big Sky Conference
- Record: 14–15 (7–7 Big Sky)
- Head coach: Adrian Buoncristiani (6th season)
- Assistant coaches: Stew Morrill; Irv Leifer
- Home arena: Kennedy Pavilion

1977–78 Big Sky men's basketball standings
	Conf.				Overall
Team	W		L	PCT	W		L	PCT
Montana	12	–	2	.857	20	–	8	.714
Idaho State	11	–	3	.786	16	–	10	.615
Weber State †	9	–	5	.643	19	–	10	.655
Boise State	8	–	6	.571	13	–	14	.481
Gonzaga	7	–	7	.500	14	–	15	.483
Northern Arizona	5	–	9	.357	11	–	14	.440
Montana State	3	–	11	.214	9	–	17	.346
Idaho	1	–	13	.071	4	–	22	.154
† Big Sky Conference tournament winner

The 1977–78 Gonzaga Bulldogs men's basketball team represented Gonzaga University during the 1977–78 NCAA Division I basketball season. Members of the Big Sky Conference, the Bulldogs were led by sixth-year head coach Adrian Buoncristiani and played their home games on campus at Kennedy Pavilion in Spokane, Washington. They were 14–15 in the regular season and 7–7 in conference play.

Gonzaga was fifth in the regular season standings and did not qualify for the four-team conference tournament.

No Bulldogs were named to the all-conference team; senior guard Jim DeWeese was on the second team, while junior center Paul Cathey and junior guard Scott Finnie were honorable mention.

Weeks after the conclusion of the season, Buoncristiani was encouraged to resign in April, days before letter of intent signing day. He was succeeded by Dan Fitzgerald, an assistant at Santa Clara; he was an assistant during ABC's first two years with the Bulldogs and also a teammate from high school (St. Ignatius) in San Francisco.

== Schedule ==
Date time, TV	Rank^{#}	Opponent^{#}	Result	Record	Site city, state
Nov 28, 1977*		at Simon Fraser	W 72–70	1–0	
Dec 1, 1977*		at Whitworth	W 88–67	2–0	
Dec 3, 1977*		at Eastern Washington	L 51–62	2–1	
Dec 5, 1977*		at Portland State	W 68–52	3–1	
Dec 7, 1977*		at Saint Mary’s	L 73–82	3–2	
Dec 10, 1977*		at Portland	L 76–81	3–3	
Dec 13, 1977*		Washington State	L 52–58	3–4	Spokane Coliseum
Dec 17, 1977*		at Puget Sound	L 49–65	3–5	
Dec 19, 1977*		at Lewis-Clark State	W 87–69	4–5	
Dec 23, 1977*		at Oregon State	L 65–76	4–6	
Dec 28, 1977*		at Nevada-Las Vegas	L 68–91	4–7	
Dec 29, 1977*		at Seattle University	L 49–64	4–8	
Jan 6, 1978		at Weber State	W 78–76	5–8	
Jan 7, 1978		at Northern Arizona	W 67–55	6–8	
Jan 14, 1978		at Idaho	W 91–71	7–8	
Jan 18, 1978*		at Chaminade	W 75–72	8–8	
Jan 20, 1978*		at Hawai’i	W 70–62	9–8	
Jan 21, 1978*		at Hawai’i	W 87–83	10–8	
Jan 27, 1978		at Montana State	W 91–76	11–8	
Jan 28, 1978		at Montana	L 55–69	11–9	
Jan 30, 1978		at Idaho	W 59–31	12–9	
Feb 3, 1978		at Montana State	L 78–80	12–10	
Feb 4, 1978		at Montana	L 47–59	12–11	
Feb 10, 1978		at Idaho State	W 81–78	13–11	
Feb 11, 1978		at Boise State	W 77–64	14–11	
Feb 17, 1978		at Idaho State	L 78–86	14–12	
Feb 18, 1978		at Boise State	L 69–80	14–13	
Feb 23, 1978		at Weber State	L 63–80	14–14	
Feb 25, 1978		at Northern Arizona	L 75–89	14–15	
*Non-conference game. ^{#}Rankings from AP Poll. (#) Tournament seedings in parentheses.
