= 1971–72 Gonzaga Bulldogs men's basketball team =

American college basketball season

1971–72 Gonzaga Bulldogs men's basketball
- Conference: Big Sky Conference
- Record: 14–12 (8–6 Big Sky)
- Head coach: Hank Anderson (21st season)
- Home arena: Kennedy Pavilion

1971–72 Big Sky men's basketball standings
	Conf.				Overall
Team	W		L	PCT	W		L	PCT
Weber State	10	–	4	.714	18	–	11	.621
Gonzaga	8	–	6	.571	14	–	12	.538
Northern Arizona	8	–	6	.571	13	–	10	.565
Idaho State	8	–	6	.571	14	–	12	.538
Montana	7	–	7	.500	14	–	11	.560
Boise State	7	–	7	.500	14	–	12	.538
Montana State	6	–	8	.429	9	–	16	.360
Idaho	2	–	12	.143	5	–	14	.263

The 1971–72 Gonzaga Bulldogs men's basketball team represented Gonzaga University during the 1971–72 NCAA University Division basketball season. Members of the Big Sky Conference, the Bulldogs were led by Hank Anderson in his twenty-first season as their head coach. They played their home games on campus at Kennedy Pavilion in Spokane, Washington. They were 14–12 overall and 8–6 in conference play, in a three-way tie for second place.

Junior forward Joe Clayton was selected to the all-conference team and junior center Greg Sten was second team. Senior guard Chris Nickola and sophomore guard Skip Molitor were honorable mention.

After over two decades at Gonzaga, Anderson left in late March to become the head coach at conference rival Montana State.

== Schedule ==
Date time, TV	Rank^{#}	Opponent^{#}	Result	Record	Site city, state
Dec 1, 1971*		at Washington State	W 77–65	1–0	
Dec 4, 1971*		at Whitworth	W 70–69	2–0	
Dec 6, 1971*		at Washington State	L 61–82	2–1	
Dec 9, 1971*		at St. Cloud State	W 64–50	3–1	
Dec 11, 1971*		at Oregon	L 69–87	3–2	
Dec 13, 1971*		at Central Washington	W 100–90	4–2	
Dec 22, 1971*		at Sacramento State	L 74–76	4–3	
Dec 23, 1971*		at Saint Mary’S	W 86–84	5–3	
Jan 6, 1972		at Weber State	L 48–84	5–4	
Jan 8, 1972		at Northern Arizona	L 82–88	5–5	
Jan 11, 1972*		at Eastern Washington	L 75–78	5–6	
Jan 15, 1972*		at Puget Sound	W 74–59	6–6	
Jan 18, 1972*		at Portland	L 68–77	6–7	
Jan 22, 1972		at Idaho	L 55–58	6–8	
Jan 28, 1972		at Montana State	W 79–61	7–8	
Jan 29, 1972		at Montana	W 66–63	8–8	
Feb 4, 1972		at Montana State	W 68–48	9–8	
Feb 5, 1972		at Montana	L 53–69	9–9	
Feb 11, 1972		at Idaho State	W 90–75	10–9	
Feb 12, 1972		at Boise State	W 70–57	11–9	
Feb 18, 1972		at Boise State	W 78–57	12–9	
Feb 19, 1972		at Idaho State	L 75–85	12–10	
Feb 21, 1972*		at Portland State	L 72–79	12–11	
Feb 25, 1972		at Weber State	W 76–68	13–11	
Feb 26, 1972		at Northern Arizona	W 88–72	14–11	
Mar 1, 1972		at Idaho	W 85–69	15–11	
*Non-conference game. ^{#}Rankings from AP Poll. (#) Tournament seedings in parentheses.
