= 1971–72 Idaho Vandals men's basketball team =

American college basketball season

1971–72 Idaho Vandals men's basketball
- Conference: Big Sky Conference
- Record: 5–14 (2–12 Big Sky)
- Head coach: Wayne Anderson (6th season)
- MVP: Steve Ton
- Home arena: Memorial Gymnasium

1971–72 Big Sky men's basketball standings
	Conf.				Overall
Team	W		L	PCT	W		L	PCT
Weber State	10	–	4	.714	18	–	11	.621
Gonzaga	8	–	6	.571	14	–	12	.538
Northern Arizona	8	–	6	.571	13	–	10	.565
Idaho State	8	–	6	.571	14	–	12	.538
Montana	7	–	7	.500	14	–	11	.560
Boise State	7	–	7	.500	14	–	12	.538
Montana State	6	–	8	.429	9	–	16	.360
Idaho	2	–	12	.143	5	–	14	.263

The 1971–72 Idaho Vandals men's basketball team represented the University of Idaho during the 1971–72 NCAA University Division basketball season. Members of the Big Sky Conference, the Vandals were led by sixth-year head coach Wayne Anderson and played their home games on campus at the Memorial Gymnasium in Moscow, Idaho. They were 5–14 overall and 2–12 in conference play.

No Vandals were named to the all-conference teams.
