= 1977–78 Boise State Broncos men's basketball team =

American college basketball season

1977–78 Boise State Broncos men's basketball
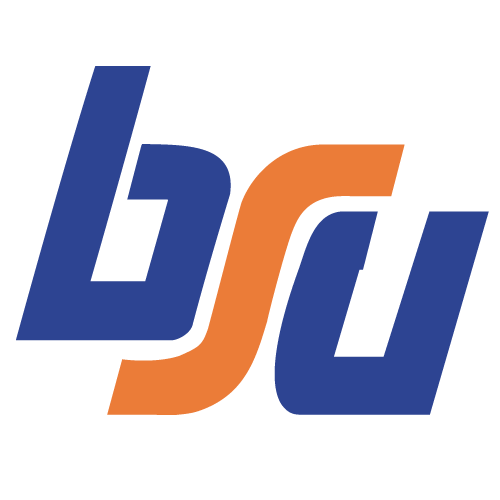
- Conference: Big Sky Conference
- Record: 13–14 (8–6 Big Sky)
- Head coach: Bus Connor (5th season)
- Home arena: Bronco Gymnasium

1977–78 Big Sky men's basketball standings
	Conf.				Overall
Team	W		L	PCT	W		L	PCT
Montana	12	–	2	.857	20	–	8	.714
Idaho State	11	–	3	.786	16	–	10	.615
Weber State †	9	–	5	.643	19	–	10	.655
Boise State	8	–	6	.571	13	–	14	.481
Gonzaga	7	–	7	.500	14	–	15	.483
Northern Arizona	5	–	9	.357	11	–	14	.440
Montana State	3	–	11	.214	9	–	17	.346
Idaho	1	–	13	.071	4	–	22	.154
† Big Sky Conference tournament winner

The 1977–78 Boise State Broncos men's basketball team represented Boise State University during the 1977–78 NCAA Division I men's basketball season. The Broncos were led by fifth-year head coach Bus Connor and played their home games on campus at Bronco Gymnasium in Boise, Idaho.

They finished the regular season at 13–13 overall, with a 8–6 record in the Big Sky Conference, fourth in the standings. In the four-team conference tournament at Missoula, the Broncos met host and regular season champion Montana in the semifinals, and lost by nine points.

Senior guard Steve Connor was named to the all-conference team; forwards Trent Johnson and Danny Jones were on the second team. The next Bronco on the first team was Vince Hinchen in 1984.

Boise State did not return to the conference tournament until 1984, when it expanded to include all eight teams.

== Postseason result ==
Date time, TV	Rank^{#}	Opponent^{#}	Result	Record	Site (attendance) city, state
Big Sky tournament
Fri, March 3; 9:00 pm	(4)	at (1) Montana; Semifinal	L 61–70	13–14	Adams Fieldhouse (9,350); Missoula, Montana
*Non-conference game. ^{#}Rankings from AP poll. (#) Tournament seedings in parentheses. All times are in Mountain time.
