= 1975–76 Gonzaga Bulldogs men's basketball team =

American college basketball season

1975–76 Gonzaga Bulldogs men's basketball
- Conference: Big Sky Conference
- Record: 13–13 (5–9 Big Sky)
- Head coach: Adrian Buoncristiani (4th season)
- Home arena: Kennedy Pavilion

1975–76 Big Sky men's basketball standings
	Conf.				Overall
Team	W		L	PCT	W		L	PCT
Weber State	9	–	5	.643	21	–	11	.656
Boise State †	9	–	5	.643	18	–	11	.621
Idaho State	9	–	5	.643	16	–	11	.593
Northern Arizona	8	–	6	.571	15	–	12	.556
Montana	7	–	7	.500	13	–	12	.520
Montana State	6	–	8	.429	9	–	16	.360
Gonzaga	5	–	9	.357	13	–	13	.500
Idaho	3	–	11	.214	7	–	19	.269
† Big Sky Conference tournament winner

The 1975–76 Gonzaga Bulldogs men's basketball team represented Gonzaga University during the 1975–76 NCAA Division I basketball season. Members of the Big Sky Conference, the Bulldogs were led by fourth-year head coach Adrian Buoncristiani and played their home games on campus at Kennedy Pavilion in Spokane, Washington. They were 13–13 overall and 5–9 in conference play.

No Bulldogs were selected for the all-conference team; junior center Jim Grady was on the second team.

The conference tournament debuted this season; through 1983, it was hosted by the regular season champion and only the top four teams participated. Gonzaga made it sole appearance the following year.

== Schedule ==
Date time, TV	Rank^{#}	Opponent^{#}	Result	Record	Site city, state
Nov 28, 1975*		at Carroll College	W 81–53	1–0	
Nov 29, 1975*		at Univ. Of The Pacific	W 51–48	2–0	
Dec 9, 1975*		at Seattle University	L 65–77	2–1	
Dec 11, 1975*		at Creighton	L 62–70	2–2	
Dec 13, 1975*		at Air Force	L 35–51	2–3	
Dec 15, 1975*		at Western Washington	W 85–69	3–3	
Dec 20, 1975*		at Regis College	W 76–48	4–3	
Dec 22, 1975*		at Puget Sound	W 71–67	5–3	
Dec 30, 1975*		at St. John’s	W 87–70	6–3	
Jan 3, 1976*		at Whitworth	W 82–62	7–3	
Jan 8, 1976		at Weber State	L 59–84	7–4	
Jan 10, 1976		at Northern Arizona	L 62–77	7–5	
Jan 16, 1976		at Idaho	L 59–60	7–6	
Jan 17, 1976*		at Hardin-Simmons	W 82–60	8–6	
Jan 23, 1976		at Idaho	W 70–61	9–6	
Jan 25, 1976*		Washington State	L 76–77	9–7	Spokane Coliseum
Jan 30, 1976		at Montana State	L 62–64	9–8	
Jan 31, 1976		at Montana	L 54–72	9–9	
Feb 6, 1976		at Montana State	W 75–66	10–9	
Feb 7, 1976		at Montana	W 60–49	11–9	
Feb 13, 1976		at Idaho State	L 74–79	11–10	
Feb 14, 1976		at Boise State	W 76–70	12–10	
Feb 20, 1976		at Idaho State	L 71–81	12–11	
Feb 21, 1976		at Boise State	L 65–89	12–12	
Feb 27, 1976		at Weber State	L 62–81	12–13	
Feb 28, 1976		at Northern Arizona	W 86–81	13–13	
*Non-conference game. ^{#}Rankings from AP Poll. (#) Tournament seedings in parentheses.
