= 1975–76 Idaho Vandals men's basketball team =

American college basketball season

1975–76 Idaho Vandals men's basketball
- Conference: Big Sky Conference
- Record: 7–19 (3–11 Big Sky)
- Head coach: Jim Jarvis (2nd season)
- Home arena: Kibbie Dome; Memorial Gymnasium

1975–76 Big Sky men's basketball standings
	Conf.				Overall
Team	W		L	PCT	W		L	PCT
Weber State	9	–	5	.643	21	–	11	.656
Boise State †	9	–	5	.643	18	–	11	.621
Idaho State	9	–	5	.643	16	–	11	.593
Northern Arizona	8	–	6	.571	15	–	12	.556
Montana	7	–	7	.500	13	–	12	.520
Montana State	6	–	8	.429	9	–	16	.360
Gonzaga	5	–	9	.357	13	–	13	.500
Idaho	3	–	11	.214	7	–	19	.269
† Big Sky Conference tournament winner

The 1975–76 Idaho Vandals men's basketball team represented the University of Idaho during the 1975–76 NCAA Division I men's basketball season. Members of the Big Sky Conference, the Vandals were led by second-year head coach Jim Jarvis and played their home games on campus at the Memorial Gymnasium and Kibbie Dome in Moscow, Idaho. They were 7–19 overall and 3–11 in conference play.

The Vandals played their first game in the Kibbie Dome on Wednesday, January 21, against Palouse rival Washington State of the Pac-8. It was commemorated with a visit by Vandal great Gus Johnson, who played in the preliminary alumni game. The evening easily set a school attendance record for basketball at 6,449, which stood for five years.

No Vandals were named to the all-conference team; senior guard Steve Weist and senior forward Ervin Brown were honorable mention. It was the fourth selection for Weist.

The conference tournament debuted this season; through 1983, it was hosted by the regular season champion and only the top four teams participated. Idaho first qualified for the tourney in 1980, then hosted and won the next two.
