= 1975–76 New Mexico Lobos women's basketball team =

Intercollegiate basketball season

1975–76 New Mexico Lobos women's basketball
- Conference: Intermountain Conference
- Record: 9–8 (Note: Individual game records show that the Lobos finished the season 11-6) (8–5 Intermountain)
- Head coach: Kathy Marpe (2nd season)
- Home arena: University Arena

The 1975–76 New Mexico Lobos women's basketball team represented the University of New Mexico in the 1975-76 AIAW women's basketball season. In their second season, the Lobos were coached by Kathy Marpe. They played in the Intermountain Conference.

== Roster ==
2019–20 New Mexico Lobos women's basketball team
Players
Coaches

Pos.	#	Name	Height	Year	Hometown
		Beth Born	—
		Sally Broyles	—
		Jane Cottner	—
		Debbie Davis	—
		Dee Dow	—
		Margaret Gonzales	—
		Linda Hattox	—
		Patty Howell	—
		Debbie Kates	—
		Carol Moreland	—
		Sharon Striker	—

Head coach

- Kathy Marpe (Minnesota)

Assistant coach(es)

Legend

- (C) Team captain
- (S) Suspended
- (I) Ineligible
- (W) Walk-on
- Injured
- Current redshirt

Roster

== Schedule and results ==
Date time, TV	Rank^{#}	Opponent^{#}	Result	Record	Site city, state
Jan 9, 1976*		Eastern New Mexico	W 48–37	1–0	University Arena; Albuquerque, NM
Jan 10, 1976*		Eastern New Mexico	L 43–47	1–1	University Arena; Albuquerque, NM
Jan 15, 1976		at Colorado State	W 69–47	2–1 (1–0)	Moby Arena; Fort Collins, CO
Jan 16, 1976		at Colorado	W 66–63	3–1 (2–0)	Balch Fieldhouse; Boulder, CO
Jan 22, 1976		Northern Colorado	W 55–38	3–2 (2–1)	University Arena; Albuquerque, NM
Jan 24, 1976		Wyoming	W 65–46	4–2 (3–1)	University Arena; Albuquerque, NM
Jan 29, 1976		at Utah State	L 53–73	4-3 (3–2)	The Spectrum; Logan, UT
Jan 31, 1976		at Weber State	L 52–58	4–4 (3–3)	Swenson Gym; Ogden, UT
Feb 6, 1976		UTEP	W 65–46	5–4 (4–3)	University Arena; Albuquerque, NM
Feb 7, 1976*		Eastern New Mexico	W 56–53	6–4	University Arena; Albuquerque, NM
Feb 12, 1976		Utah	L 43–57	6–5 (4–4)	University Arena; Albuquerque, NM
Feb 14, 1976		at BYU	W 63–61	7–5 (5–4)	University Arena; Albuquerque, NM
Feb 20, 1976		at Arizona	W 58–51	8–5 (6–4)	McKale Center; Tucson, AZ
Feb 22, 1976		at Northern Arizona	W 49–46	9–5 (7–4)	Lumberjack Gymnasium; Flagstaff, AZ
Feb 25, 1976		at Arizona State	L 49–50	9–6 (7–5)	ASU Activity Center; Tempe, AZ
Feb 27, 1976*		Gallup	W 73–69	10–6	University Arena; Albuquerque, NM
Feb 28, 1975		New Mexico State; Rio Grande Rivalry	W 74–65	11–6 (8–5)	University Arena; Albuquerque, NM
*Non-conference game. ^{#}Rankings from AP Poll. (#) Tournament seedings in parentheses.
