= 1971–72 Weber State Wildcats men's basketball team =

American college basketball season

1971–72 Weber State Wildcats men's basketball

Big Sky champions

NCAA tournament, Sweet Sixteen
- Conference: Big Sky Conference

Ranking
- Coaches: No. 19 т
- Record: 18–11 (10–4 Big Sky)
- Head coach: Gene Visscher (1st season)
- Assistant coach: Neil McCarthy
- Home arena: Wildcat Gym

1971–72 Big Sky men's basketball standings
	Conf.				Overall
Team	W		L	PCT	W		L	PCT
Weber State	10	–	4	.714	18	–	11	.621
Gonzaga	8	–	6	.571	14	–	12	.538
Northern Arizona	8	–	6	.571	13	–	10	.565
Idaho State	8	–	6	.571	14	–	12	.538
Montana	7	–	7	.500	14	–	11	.560
Boise State	7	–	7	.500	14	–	12	.538
Montana State	6	–	8	.429	9	–	16	.360
Idaho	2	–	12	.143	5	–	14	.263

The 1971–72 Weber State Wildcats men's basketball team represented Weber State College during the 1971–72 NCAA University Division basketball season. Members of the Big Sky Conference, the Wildcats were led by first-year head coach Gene Visscher and played their home games on campus at Wildcat Gym in Ogden, Utah. They were 17–9 in the regular season and 10–4 in conference play.

The conference tournament was four years away, and for the fifth consecutive season, Weber State won the Big Sky title and played in the 25-team NCAA tournament. In the West regional, the Wildcats defeated #12 Hawaii 91–64 in the first round in Pocatello, Idaho, and advanced to the Sweet Sixteen in Provo. Weber fell to eventual champion UCLA by 32 points, then dropped the third-place game to San Francisco.

Senior forward Bob Davis was named to the all-conference team; senior forward Jon Knoble and junior guard Brady Small were on the second team.

== Postseason results ==
Date time, TV	Opponent	Result	Record	Site (attendance) city, state
NCAA tournament
Sat, March 11*; 4:30 pm	vs. No. 12 Hawaii; First round	W 91–64	18–9	ISU Minidome (13,000); Pocatello, Idaho
Thu, March 16*; 7:05 pm	vs. No. 1 UCLA; Regional semifinal (Sweet 16)	L 58–90	18–10	Marriott Center (15,247); Provo, Utah
Sat, March 18*; 2:00 pm	vs. San Francisco; Regional Third Place	L 64–74	18–11	Marriott Center (15,152); Provo, Utah
*Non-conference game. ^{#}Rankings from AP poll. (#) Tournament seedings in parentheses. All times are in Mountain time.
