= 1977–78 Montana Grizzlies basketball team =

American college basketball season

1977–78 Montana Grizzlies men's basketball

Big Sky regular season champions
- Conference: Big Sky Conference
- Record: 20–8 (12–2 Big Sky)
- Head coach: Jim Brandenburg (2nd season)
- Assistant coach: Mike Montgomery
- Home arena: Adams Field House

1977–78 Big Sky men's basketball standings
	Conf.				Overall
Team	W		L	PCT	W		L	PCT
Montana	12	–	2	.857	20	–	8	.714
Idaho State	11	–	3	.786	16	–	10	.615
Weber State †	9	–	5	.643	19	–	10	.655
Boise State	8	–	6	.571	13	–	14	.481
Gonzaga	7	–	7	.500	14	–	15	.483
Northern Arizona	5	–	9	.357	11	–	14	.440
Montana State	3	–	11	.214	9	–	17	.346
Idaho	1	–	13	.071	4	–	22	.154
† Big Sky Conference tournament winner

The 1977–78 Montana Grizzlies basketball team represented the University of Montana during the 1977–78 NCAA Division I basketball season. Charter members of the Big Sky Conference, the Grizzlies were led by second-year head coach Jim Brandenburg and played their home games on campus at Adams Field House in Missoula, Montana.

They finished the regular season at 19–7, with a 12–2 record in conference to win the title and host the four-team Big Sky tournament. The Grizzlies defeated fourth-seed Boise State in the semifinal, then were upset by third-seed Weber State in the final in overtime. Montana had swept the season series with Weber.

The Grizzlies were led on the court by senior guard Micheal Ray Richardson, on the all-conference team for a third consecutive year; junior forward Allan Nielsen was on the second team. An honorable mention All-American, Richardson was the fourth overall selection of the 1978 NBA draft and a four-time NBA All-Star.

== Postseason results ==
Date time, TV	Rank^{#}	Opponent^{#}	Result	Record	Site (attendance) city, state
Big Sky tournament
Fri, March 3; 9:00 pm	(1)	(4) Boise State; Semifinal	W 70–61	20–7	Adams Field House (9,350); Missoula, Montana
Sat, March 4; 8:00 pm	(1)	(3) Weber State; Final	L 55–62 ^{OT}	20–8	Adams Field House (9,203); Missoula, Montana
*Non-conference game. ^{#}Rankings from AP poll. (#) Tournament seedings in parentheses. All times are in Mountain time.
