= 2004–05 Montana Grizzlies basketball team =

American college basketball season

2004–05 Montana Grizzlies basketball

Big Sky tournament champions

NCAA tournament, First round
- Conference: Big Sky Conference
- Record: 18–13 (9–5 Big Sky)
- Head coach: Larry Krystkowiak (1st season)
- Home arena: Dahlberg Arena

2004–05 Big Sky men's basketball standings
	Conf.				Overall
Team	W		L	PCT	W		L	PCT
Portland State	11	–	3	.786	19	–	9	.679
Montana State	9	–	5	.643	14	–	14	.500
Montana †	9	–	5	.643	18	–	13	.581
Sacramento State	8	–	6	.571	12	–	16	.429
Weber State	7	–	7	.500	14	–	16	.467
Eastern Washington	5	–	9	.357	8	–	20	.286
Northern Arizona	4	–	10	.286	11	–	17	.393
Idaho State	3	–	11	.214	9	–	18	.333
† Conference tournament winner

The 2005–06 Montana Grizzlies basketball team represented the University of Montana during the 2004–05 NCAA Division I men's basketball season. The Grizzlies, led by first-year head coach Larry Krystkowiak, played their home games at Dahlberg Arena and were members of the Big Sky Conference. They finished the season 18–13, 9–5 in Big Sky play to finish tied for second place in the conference regular season standings. Montana won the Big Sky Basketball tournament to earn the conference's automatic berth into the NCAA tournament. Playing as the No. 16 seed in the West region, the Grizzlies lost to No. 1 seed Washington.

== Roster ==
2004–05 Montana Grizzlies men's basketball team
Players
Coaches

Pos.	#	Name	Height	Weight	Year	Hometown
G	12	Kevin Criswell	6 ft 2 in (1.88 m)	200 lb (91 kg)	Jr	Colstrip, Montana
F	34	Andrew Strait	6 ft 8 in (2.03 m)	245 lb (111 kg)	Fr	Yakima, Washington
F	50	Kamarr Davis	6 ft 7 in (2.01 m)	255 lb (116 kg)	Sr	Milwaukee, Wisconsin

Head coach

- Larry Krystkowiak

Assistant coach(es)

Legend

- (C) Team captain
- (S) Suspended
- (I) Ineligible
- (W) Walk-on
- Injured
- Current redshirt

Roster

== Schedule and results ==
Date time, TV	Rank^{#}	Opponent^{#}	Result	Record	Site (attendance) city, state
Regular season
Nov 21, 2004*		at No. 25 Gonzaga	L 62–78	0–1	McCarthey Athletic Center (5,917); Spokane, Washington
Dec 23, 2004*		at Stanford	L 66–84	4–7	Maples Pavilion (4,332); Stanford, California
2006 Big Sky Tournament
Mar 5, 2005*		Eastern Washington; Quarterfinals	W 58–48	16–12	Dahlberg Arena (3,111); Missoula, Montana
Mar 8, 2005*		vs. Montana State; Semifinals	W 79–67	17–12	Memorial Coliseum; Portland, Oregon
Mar 9, 2005*		vs. Weber State; Championship game	W 63–61	18–12	Memorial Coliseum (1,825); Portland, Oregon
2006 NCAA Tournament
Mar 17, 2005*	(16 W)	vs. (1 W) No. 8 Washington; First round	L 77–88	18–13	Taco Bell Arena (11,871); Boise, Idaho
*Non-conference game. ^{#}Rankings from AP Poll. (#) Tournament seedings in parentheses. All times are in Mountain Time (#) during NCAA Tournament is seed with Region.
