= 1969–70 Boise State Broncos men's basketball team =

American college basketball season

1969–70 Boise State Broncos men's basketball

NCAA College Division tournament, first round
- Conference: Independent
- Record: 20–8
- Head coach: Murray Satterfield (5th season)
- Assistant coach: Bus Connor
- Home arena: Bronco Gym

The 1969–70 Boise State Broncos men's basketball team represented Boise State College in the 1969–70 NCAA College Division college basketball season. The Broncos were led by fifth-year head coach Murray Satterfield and played their home games on campus at the Bronco Gym in Boise, Idaho.

They gained an invitation to the 32-team College Division tournament (now Division II), but lost to California–Riverside in the first round at Tacoma, Washington, then defeated Sacramento State in the consolation game for third place.

It was Boise State's final season before joining the Big Sky Conference, which was in the University Division for basketball. Bus Connor was in his second season as a Bronco assistant coach; he was promoted to head coach in January 1973.

== Postseason results ==
Date time, TV	Opponent	Result	Record	Site (attendance) city, state
NCAA College Division Tournament
Thu, March 5*	vs. California–Riverside; Far West region semifinals	L 71–83	19–8	Tacoma, Washington
Sat, March 7*	vs. Sacramento State; Reigional Third Place	W 63–61	20–8	Tacoma, Washington
*Non-conference game. (#) Tournament seedings in parentheses.
