= 1975–76 Weber State Wildcats men's basketball team =

American college basketball season

1975–76 Weber State Wildcats men's basketball

Big Sky regular season co–champions
- Conference: Big Sky Conference
- Record: 21–11 (9–5 Big Sky)
- Head coach: Neil McCarthy (1st season)
- Home arena: Wildcat Gym

1975–76 Big Sky men's basketball standings
	Conf.				Overall
Team	W		L	PCT	W		L	PCT
Weber State	9	–	5	.643	21	–	11	.656
Boise State †	9	–	5	.643	18	–	11	.621
Idaho State	9	–	5	.643	16	–	11	.593
Northern Arizona	8	–	6	.571	15	–	12	.556
Montana	7	–	7	.500	13	–	12	.520
Montana State	6	–	8	.429	9	–	16	.360
Gonzaga	5	–	9	.357	13	–	13	.500
Idaho	3	–	11	.214	7	–	19	.269
† Big Sky Conference tournament winner

The 1975–76 Weber State Wildcats men's basketball team represented Weber State College during the 1975–76 NCAA Division I basketball season. Members of the Big Sky Conference, the Wildcats were led by first-year head coach Neil McCarthy and played their home games on campus at Wildcat Gym in Ogden, Utah. They were 20–10 overall in the regular season and 9–5 in conference play.

This was McCarthy's first full season as head coach; he had been promoted in the middle of the previous season, following the sudden resignation of Gene Visscher in late January.

The Wildcats were regular season co-champions with Idaho State and Boise State, and the league champion hosted the new conference tournament. The seeding of the three co-champions for the four-team bracket was done by a random draw in late February, conducted via a Saturday night conference telephone call by commissioner John Roning from Moscow, Idaho.

Weber was drawn as the top seed, which included the right to host at Wildcat Gym in Ogden. At this time, both Weber and Boise still played in small gymnasiums, while ISU's Minidome had more than double the seating capacity of the others.

The Wildcats defeated fourth-seeded Northern Arizona in the semifinal, but lost to Boise State in the final in double overtime.

For the third consecutive year, senior forward Jimmie Watts was named to the all-conference team, this time as a unanimous choice. Senior center Al DeWitt was on the second team, and senior forward Paul Marigney was honorable mention.

== Postseason results ==
Date time, TV	Opponent	Result	Record	Site (attendance) city, state
Big Sky tournament
Fri, March 5; 7:00 pm	Northern Arizona; Semifinal	W 63–58	21–10	Wildcat Gym (4,411); Ogden, Utah
Sat, March 6; 8:00 pm	Boise State; Final	L 70–77 ^{2OT}	21–11	Wildcat Gym (4,679); Ogden, Utah
*Non-conference game. ^{#}Rankings from AP poll. (#) Tournament seedings in parentheses. All times are in Mountain time.
