= 2005 Big Sky Conference men's basketball tournament =

- Classification: Division I
- Season: 2004–05
- Teams: 6
- First round site: campus sites
- Semifinals site: Memorial Coliseum; Portland, OR
- Finals site: Memorial Coliseum; Portland, OR
- Champions: Montana (5th title)
- Winning coach: Larry Krystkowiak (1st title)
- MVP: Kamarr Davis (Montana)

2004–05 Big Sky men's basketball standings
	Conf.				Overall
Team	W		L	PCT	W		L	PCT
Portland State	11	–	3	.786	19	–	9	.679
Montana State	9	–	5	.643	14	–	14	.500
Montana †	9	–	5	.643	18	–	13	.581
Sacramento State	8	–	6	.571	12	–	16	.429
Weber State	7	–	7	.500	14	–	16	.467
Eastern Washington	5	–	9	.357	8	–	20	.286
Northern Arizona	4	–	10	.286	11	–	17	.393
Idaho State	3	–	11	.214	9	–	18	.333
† Conference tournament winner

The 2005 Big Sky men's basketball tournament was played from March 5 to March 9. The First Round of the tournament was held at the higher seed's home arena, and the semi-finals and championship were held at the Memorial Coliseum in Portland, Oregon, which is the home of regular season champion Portland State. The top 6 teams from regular season play qualified and the top 2 teams received a bye to the semi-finals. The tournament was won by Montana and they received an automatic bid to the 2005 NCAA Men's Division I Basketball Tournament.

== Bracket ==
First Round; March 5
4	Sacramento State	71
5	Weber State	74
3	Montana	58
6	Eastern Washington	48

Re-Seeded Semifinals; March 8
1	Portland State	61
5	Weber State	71
2	Montana State	67
3	Montana	79

Championship; March 9
5	Weber State	61
3	Montana	63
