= Jud Heathcote =

American basketball player and coach

Biographical details
- Born: May 27, 1927; Harvey, North Dakota, U.S.
- Died: August 28, 2017 (aged 90); Spokane, Washington, U.S.

Playing career
- 1946–1949: Washington State

Coaching career (HC unless noted)
- 1950–1964: West Valley HS (WA)
- 1964–1971: Washington State (assistant)
- 1971–1976: Montana
- 1976–1995: Michigan State

Head coaching record
- Overall: 419–274 (college)

Accomplishments and honors

Championships
- NCAA Division I tournament (1979); 2 Big Sky regular season (1975, 1976); 3 Big Ten regular season (1978, 1979, 1990)

Awards
- NABC Coach of the Year (1990); Sporting News Coach of the Year Award (1995); Big Sky Coach of the Year (1975); 2× Big Ten Coach of the Year (1978, 1986)
- College Basketball Hall of Fame; Inducted in 2009

George Melvin "Jud" Heathcote (May 27, 1927 – August 28, 2017) was an American basketball player and coach. He was a college basketball head coach for 24 seasons: five at the University of Montana (1971–1976) and nineteen at Michigan State University (1976–1995). Heathcote coached Magic Johnson during his two years at Michigan State, concluding with the 1979 national championship season. He also coached the University of Montana to a national handball championship in 1974.

== Early years ==
Born in Harvey, North Dakota, to Marion Grant Heathcote and Fawn (Walsh), Heathcote's father was a coach, but died in a 1930 diphtheria epidemic. His mother was a teacher and moved to live with her parents in Manchester, Washington, west of Seattle.

Heathcote developed into a fine three-sport athlete at South Kitsap High School in Port Orchard, and after a year in the Navy V-5 program as World War II ended, he enrolled at Washington State College in Pullman and played basketball for the Cougars under head coach Jack Friel.

== Coaching career ==
At age 44, Montana was the first for Heathcote as head coach of a college varsity program. Out of college, he coached for fourteen seasons at West Valley High School in Spokane, Washington, then at alma mater Washington State for seven years under Marv Harshman; five as freshman coach and two as frosh-varsity coach.

Montana had little historic success in the sport, but in his fourth season at Missoula in 1974–75, Heathcote led the Grizzlies to their first Big Sky Conference championship. They advanced to the NCAA Regionals, but lost by three in Portland in the Sweet Sixteen to eventual champion UCLA. Montana would not win another game in the Tournament until 2006.

Heathcote was hired by Joseph Kearney at Michigan State in April 1976 and began the most successful phase of his coaching career. In his third season in East Lansing, he guided the Spartans to the NCAA championship. Led on the court by sophomore Magic Johnson, MSU defeated the Larry Bird-led Indiana State Sycamores in the title game in Salt Lake City.

In his nineteen years at Michigan State, the Spartans made nine NCAA tournament appearances and three National Invitation Tournament (NIT) appearances. As a coach, Heathcote was particularly noted for his excellent defensive strategies on the court and was second to none in blocking the opposing team from penetrating to the hoop. Heathcote retired after the 1994–95 season, having won 418 games and lost 275, for a .603 winning percentage. He was succeeded by Tom Izzo, a thirteen-year assistant coach and associate head coach for Heathcote's final five seasons.

== Retirement ==
After retiring from coaching, Heathcote returned to Spokane, where he lived until his death. He played handball until well into his seventies, and continued to play recreational golf. While Heathcote continued to follow Michigan State during the college season, his primary basketball interest in his final years was the local Gonzaga University; he attended all Bulldogs home games, and had a monthly lunch with head coach Mark Few.

On August 28, 2017, Heathcote died at the age of 90. "Michigan State has lost one of its icons today," current MSU basketball coach Tom Izzo said in a statement. "And yet, nothing can erase his impact on the program, the players he coached and the coaches he mentored. Spartan basketball is what it is today because of Jud Heathcote."

== Head coaching record ==
=== College ===
Record table
Season	Team	Overall	Conference	Standing	Postseason
Montana Grizzlies (Big Sky Conference) (1971–1976)
1971–72	Montana	14–12	7–7	T–4th	
1972–73	Montana	13–13	7–7	4th	
1973–74	Montana	19–8	11–3	T–1st	
1974–75	Montana	21–8	13–1	1st	NCAA Division I Sweet 16
1975–76	Montana	13–12	7–7	5th	
Montana:		80–53 (.602)	45–25 (.643)		
Michigan State Spartans (Big Ten Conference) (1976–1995)
1976–77	Michigan State	12–15*	9–9*	6th	
1977–78	Michigan State	25–5	15–3	1st	NCAA Division I Elite Eight
1978–79	Michigan State	26–6	13–5	1st	NCAA Division I Champion
1979–80	Michigan State	12–15	6–12	8th	
1980–81	Michigan State	13–14	7–11	8th	
1981–82	Michigan State	12–16^	7–11^	T–7th	
1982–83	Michigan State	17–13	9–9	T–6th	NIT second round
1983–84	Michigan State	16–12^	9–9^	5th	
1984–85	Michigan State	19–10	10–8	T–5th	NCAA Division I first round
1985–86	Michigan State	23–8	12–6	3rd	NCAA Division I Sweet 16
1986–87	Michigan State	11–17	6–12	7th	
1987–88	Michigan State	10–18	5–13	8th	
1988–89	Michigan State	18–15	6–12	T–8th	NIT semifinal
1989–90	Michigan State	28–6	15–3	1st	NCAA Division I Sweet 16
1990–91	Michigan State	19–11	11–7	T–3rd	NCAA Division I second round
1991–92	Michigan State	22–8	11–7	T–3rd	NCAA Division I second round
1992–93	Michigan State	15–13	7–11	T–8th	NIT first round
1993–94	Michigan State	20–12	10–8	T–4th	NCAA Division I second round
1994–95	Michigan State	22–6	14–4	2nd	NCAA Division I first round
Michigan State:		340–220 (.607)	182–160 (.532)		
Total:		420–273 (.606)			
National champion Postseason invitational champion Conference regular season champion Conference regular season and conference tournament champion Division regular season champion Division regular season and conference tournament champion Conference tournament champion

*Due to forfeits related to NCAA sanctions to Minnesota for improper selling of tickets, MSU's official record for the 1976–77 season is 12–15, 9–9 though they finished the season 10–17, 7–11.
^Due to NCAA sanctions against Wisconsin for providing improper benefits for players, MSU's official record for the 1981–82 season is 12–16, 7–11 though they finished the season 11–17, 6–12. The official record for the 1983–84 seasonal is 16–12, 9–9 though they finished the season 15–13, 8–10

== See also ==
- Heathcote (surname)
- List of NCAA Division I Men's Final Four appearances by coach
