= Larry Krystkowiak =

American basketball player and coach

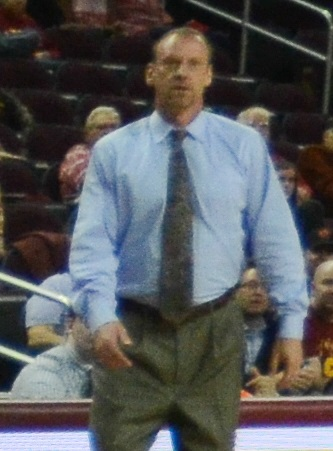
- Krystkowiak in 2014

Personal information
- Born: September 23, 1964 (age 62) Shelby, Montana, U.S.
- Listed height: 6 ft 9 in (2.06 m)
- Listed weight: 220 lb (100 kg)

Career information
- High school: Big Sky (Missoula, Montana)
- College: Montana (1982–1986)
- NBA draft: 1986: 2nd round, 28th overall pick
- Drafted by: Chicago Bulls
- Playing career: 1986–1998
- Position: Power forward
- Number: 42, 7
- Coaching career: 1998–present

Career history

Playing
- 1986–1987: San Antonio Spurs
- 1987–1992: Milwaukee Bucks
- 1992–1993: Utah Jazz
- 1993–1994: Orlando Magic
- 1994–1995: Chicago Bulls
- 1995–1996: Levallois
- 1997: Los Angeles Lakers
- 1997–1998: Idaho Stampede

Coaching
- 1998–2000: Montana (assistant)
- 2001–2002: Old Dominion (assistant)
- 2003–2004: Idaho Stampede
- 2004–2006: Montana
- 2006–2007: Milwaukee Bucks (assistant)
- 2007–2008: Milwaukee Bucks
- 2010: USA U18 men's national team
- 2010–2011: New Jersey Nets (assistant)
- 2011–2021: Utah

Career highlights
- As player: 3× Big Sky Player of the Year (1984–1986); 3× First-team All-Big Sky (1984–1986); No. 42 jersey retired by Montana Grizzlies; As coach: 2× Big Sky tournament champion (2004, 2005); Pac-12 AP Coach of the Year (2018)

Career NBA statistics
- Points: 3,425 (8.2 ppg)
- Rebounds: 2,051 (4.9 rpg)
- Assists: 513 (1.2 apg)
- Stats at NBA.com
- Stats at Basketball Reference
Medals
Men's basketball
Representing United States
FIBA U19 World Cup
Gold medal – first place	1983 Palma de Mallorca	Under-19

Larry Brett Krystkowiak (/krɪsˈkoʊviæk/ kris-KOH-vee-ak; born September 23, 1964) is an American retired professional basketball player, and former head coach of the Utah Utes men's basketball team.

== Early life ==
Krystkowiak was born in Missoula, Montana, to Bernard and Helen Krystkowiak. At a young age, his mother always encouraged Larry to participate in sports. His mother died of Hodgkin's lymphoma when he was eight years old and his father remarried. He primarily grew up in Shelby, Montana, and his step-mother did not approve of Larry playing sports. At the age of 15, Larry moved out of Shelby and finished his high school career at Big Sky High School in Missoula. During this time he lived with his older brother Bernie, who became Larry's legal guardian.

== College career ==
Krystkowiak played college basketball for the University of Montana from 1982 to 1986 and still holds the school records for career points scored (2,017) and rebounds (1,105). He is the only person to have been named Big Sky Conference MVP three times (1984–1986). Krystkowiak's jersey number was retired by the University of Montana.

== Professional playing career ==
Krystkowiak was selected by the Chicago Bulls in the second round (28th overall pick) of the 1986 NBA draft. He played power forward for nine seasons in the NBA, spending the bulk of his career with the Milwaukee Bucks. He also played for the San Antonio Spurs, Utah Jazz, Orlando Magic, Chicago Bulls and Los Angeles Lakers. In the 1988–89 season he averaged 12.7 points, 7.6 rebounds, 1.3 assists and over 30 minutes per game for the Bucks. Over his NBA career, he averaged 8.1 points and 4.9 rebounds per contest.

== NBA career statistics ==
Legend
GP	Games played	GS	Games started	MPG	Minutes per game
FG%	Field goal percentage	3P%	3-point field goal percentage	FT%	Free throw percentage
RPG	Rebounds per game	APG	Assists per game	SPG	Steals per game
BPG	Blocks per game	PPG	Points per game	**Bold**	Career high

=== Regular season ===
Year	Team	GP	GS	MPG	FG%	3P%	FT%	RPG	APG	SPG	BPG	PPG
1986–87	San Antonio	68	2	14.8	.456	.083	.743	3.5	1.3	0.3	**0.2**	6.6
1987–88	Milwaukee	50	7	21.0	.481	.000	.811	4.6	1.0	0.4	**0.2**	7.2
1988–89	Milwaukee	**80**	**77**	**30.9**	.473	**.333**	.823	**7.6**	1.3	**1.2**	0.1	**12.7**
1989–90	Milwaukee	16	7	23.8	.364	.000	.788	4.8	**1.6**	0.6	0.1	7.0
1991–92	Milwaukee	79	16	23.4	.444	.000	.757	5.4	1.4	0.7	**0.2**	9.0
1992–93	Utah	71	0	19.2	.466	.000	.796	3.9	1.0	0.6	**0.2**	7.2
1993–94	Orlando	34	11	20.1	.480	.000	.795	3.6	1.0	0.4	0.1	5.1
1994–95	Chicago	19	14	15.1	.389	.000	**.900**	3.1	1.4	0.5	0.1	4.4
1996–97	Los Angeles	3	0	3.7	**.500**	.000	.500	1.7	1.0	0.7	0.0	1.0
Career		420	134	21.7	.457	.139	.795	4.9	1.2	0.6	0.1	8.2

=== Playoffs ===
Year	Team	GP	GS	MPG	FG%	3P%	FT%	RPG	APG	SPG	BPG	PPG
1987–88	Milwaukee	5	5	**32.6**	**.448**	.000	.889	6.8	1.4	0.8	0.0	8.4
1988–89	Milwaukee	**8**	**8**	29.9	.426	.000	.871	5.6	1.5	0.3	0.1	**10.6**
1990–91	Milwaukee	3	0	8.3	.167	.000	.000	1.0	0.7	0.3	0.0	0.7
1992–93	Utah	1	0	8.0	.000	.000	.000	2.0	0.0	0.0	0.0	0.0
1993–94	Orlando	3	3	30.7	.389	.000	**1.000**	**8.3**	**3.0**	**1.0**	**0.7**	6.0
Career		20	16	26.4	.410	.000	.887	5.5	1.5	0.5	0.2	7.4

== Coaching career ==
=== Early career ===
Krystkowiak began his coaching career in 1998 as an assistant to Don Holst at his alma mater, the University of Montana. He coached at Montana until 2000 when he left to join Old Dominion as an assistant under former Griz head coach, Blaine Taylor. He spent one season (2001–2002) at Old Dominion.

Krystkowiak got his first opportunity as a head coach with the CBA's Idaho Stampede in 2003–04. In his single season as the Stampede's head coach, he led the team to a 37–16 record and a CBA championship game berth.

He was hired as head men's basketball coach at the University of Montana in May 2004. He led the Griz to a 42–20 overall record over the course of the next two seasons, reaching the NCAA tournament each year as a result of winning the Big Sky Conference tourney. In 2006 the Grizzlies beat heavily favored, fifth seed, Nevada, in the NCAA tournament.

=== NBA coaching career ===
In June 2006 Krystkowiak left Montana to take a job as an assistant coach with the Milwaukee Bucks under Terry Stotts. Krystkowiak was responsible for working with Milwaukee's big men, notably second year players Andrew Bogut and Charlie Villanueva. He was named head coach of the team on March 14, 2007, after Stotts was fired. Stotts had led the Bucks to a 23–41 record during the 2006–07 season. He signed a reported 4-year contract with the Bucks, with an average annual salary of $2 million Krystkowiak's NBA head coaching debut on March 15, 2007, resulted in a 101–90 victory over the San Antonio Spurs.

On April 17, 2008, Krystkowiak was fired as Milwaukee Bucks head coach after a disappointing season in which the Bucks compiled the league's sixth worst record.

In July 2010 Krystkowiak joined the New Jersey Nets coaching staff alongside Avery Johnson and Sam Mitchell.

=== University of Utah ===
On April 3, 2011, it was announced that Krystkowiak would take over the head coaching position for the University of Utah men's basketball team, as they transitioned into Utah's first season in the newly realigned Pac-12.

After Krystkowiak was named Utah's head coach, eight players left the program to play elsewhere and he was forced to bring in several junior college and walk-on players to fill his depleted roster. In a season where starting center David Foster missed the entire season and starting point guard Josh "Jiggy" Watkins was dismissed halfway through, Krystkowiak and the Utes struggled to a 6–25 finish, including only three wins against their new Pac-12 opponents.

The 2012–2013 season showed much improvement for Krystkowiak's Utes. The additions of freshmen Jordan Loveridge and Brandon Taylor, as well as great play and leadership from senior center Jason Washburn, would help Utah more than double their win total from the previous season. On March 9, 2013, Utah closed out its season by defeating No. 19 Oregon, celebrating Senior Night at the Huntsman Center with the program's first victory over a ranked opponent since 2009. Utah then defeated USC and California in the first and second rounds of the Pac-12 tournament before losing a rematch with Oregon, the eventual champion.

Krystkowiak's third season saw the 2013–2014 Runnin' Utes reach their first postseason tournament under the coach. The addition of transfer point guard Delon Wright and an improved core of players led Utah to a 21–12 record, receiving an at-large bid to the NIT. The next year, he led his team to the sweet sixteen, their highest run in the tournament in years. In 2017–18, he led the Utes to their first NIT finals appearance in 44 years.

The National Polish-American Sports Hall of Fame nominated Krystkowiak for its Class of 2013. On June 21, 2018, Krystkowiak was enshrined into the National Polish-American Sports Hall of Fame as a member of the Class of 2018 in Troy, Michigan.

On March 16, 2021, Larry was fired by the University of Utah.

== Personal life ==
Larry and his wife, Jan, have five children, Cam, Luc, Ben and twin girls Sam and Fin. He has seen his father only once in over 30 years, because of the issues in his early life.

== Head coaching record ==
Larry Krystkowiak's record as a head coach.

=== CBA ===
Team	Year	Regular season					Postseason
Team	Year	G	W	L	Pct	Finish	Result
Idaho Stampede	2003–04	53	37	16	.698		Lost CBA championship game

=== College ===
Record table
Season	Team	Overall	Conference	Standing	Postseason
Montana Grizzlies (Big Sky Conference) (2004–2006)
2004–05	Montana	18–13	9–5	2nd	NCAA Division I Round of 64
2005–06	Montana	24–7	10–4	2nd	NCAA Division I Round of 32
Montana:		42–20 (.677)	19–9 (.679)		
Utah Utes (Pac-12 Conference) (2011–2021)
2011–12	Utah	6–25	3–15	11th	
2012–13	Utah	15–18	5–13	10th	
2013–14	Utah	21–12	9–9	T–8th	NIT First Round
2014–15	Utah	26–9	13–5	T–2nd	NCAA Division I Sweet 16
2015–16	Utah	27–9	13–5	2nd	NCAA Division I Round of 32
2016–17	Utah	20–12	11–7	4th	NIT First Round
2017–18	Utah	23–12	11–7	T–3rd	NIT Runner-Up
2018–19	Utah	17–14	11–7	3rd	
2019–20	Utah	16–15	7–11	T–8th	
2020–21	Utah	12–13	8–11	8th	
Utah:		183–139 (.568)	91–90 (.503)		
Total:		225–159 (.586)			
National champion Postseason invitational champion Conference regular season champion Conference regular season and conference tournament champion Division regular season champion Division regular season and conference tournament champion Conference tournament champion

=== NBA ===
Legend
Regular season	G	Games coached	W	Games won	L	Games lost	W–L %	Win–loss %
Playoffs	PG	Playoff games	PW	Playoff wins	PL	Playoff losses	PW–L %	Playoff win–loss %

Team	Year	G	W	L	W–L%	Finish	PG	PW	PL	PW–L%	Result
Milwaukee	2006–07	18	5	13	.278	5th in Central	—	—	—	—	Missed playoffs
Milwaukee	2007–08	82	26	56	.317	5th in Central	—	—	—	—	Missed playoffs
Career		100	31	69	.310		—	—	—	—	

== See also ==
- List of NCAA Division I men's basketball players with 2000 points and 1000 rebounds
