= 1977–78 Weber State Wildcats men's basketball team =

American college basketball season

1977–78 Weber State Wildcats men's basketball

Big Sky tournament champions
- Conference: Big Sky Conference
- Record: 19–10 (9–5 Big Sky)
- Head coach: Neil McCarthy (3rd season)
- Home arena: Dee Events Center

1977–78 Big Sky men's basketball standings
	Conf.				Overall
Team	W		L	PCT	W		L	PCT
Montana	12	–	2	.857	20	–	8	.714
Idaho State	11	–	3	.786	16	–	10	.615
Weber State †	9	–	5	.643	19	–	10	.655
Boise State	8	–	6	.571	13	–	14	.481
Gonzaga	7	–	7	.500	14	–	15	.483
Northern Arizona	5	–	9	.357	11	–	14	.440
Montana State	3	–	11	.214	9	–	17	.346
Idaho	1	–	13	.071	4	–	22	.154
† Big Sky Conference tournament winner

The 1977–78 Weber State Wildcats men's basketball team represented Weber State College during the 1977–78 NCAA Division I basketball season. Members of the Big Sky Conference, the Wildcats were led by third-year head coach Neil McCarthy and played their home games on campus at the new Dee Events Center in Ogden, Utah. They were 17–9 overall in the regular season and 9–5 in conference play.

Weber State was third in the regular season standings and qualified for the four-team conference tournament, hosted by regular season champion Montana in Missoula. The Wildcats defeated defending champion Idaho State in the semifinal, then upset the host in the final in overtime.

Weber State appeared in the first five finals of the conference tournament; this was the first of three consecutive titles.

The Wildcats received the Big Sky's automatic bid to the 32-team NCAA tournament, but lost in the first round to seventh-ranked Arkansas in Eugene, Oregon; Arkansas ultimately advanced to the Final Four. It was Weber State's first NCAA appearance in five years, since they went to six consecutive (1968–1973).

Sophomore guard Bruce Collins was named to the all-conference team; forward David Johnson and center Richard Smith, also sophomores, were honorable mention.

== Schedule and results ==
Date time, TV	Rank^{#}	Opponent^{#}	Result	Record	Site (attendance) city, state
Regular season
Tue, Nov 29*		Long Beach State	W 99–96 ^{OT}	1–0	Dee Events Center; Ogden, Utah
Sat, Dec 3*		Loyola Marymount	W 70–64	2–0	Dee Events Center; Ogden, Utah
Mon, Dec 5*		Midwestern State	W 107–72	3–0	Dee Events Center; Ogden, Utah
Sat, Dec 10*		Utah State	W 84–79 ^{OT}	4–0	Dee Events Center; Ogden, Utah
Wed, Dec 14*		UC Davis	W 95–65	5–0	Dee Events Center; Ogden, Utah
Sat, Dec 17*		at Oregon State	L 72–74 ^{OT}	5–1	Gill Coliseum; Corvallis, Oregon
Tue, Dec 20*		Utah	W 71–61	6–1	Dee Events Center; Ogden, Utah
Tue, Dec 27*		at Utah	L 88–98	6–2	Special Events Center; Salt Lake City, Utah
Fri, Dec 30*		Sacramento State	W 82–73	7–2	Dee Events Center; Ogden, Utah
Tue, Jan 3*		at BYU	L 76–81	7–3	Marriott Center; Provo, Utah
Fri, Jan 6*		at Gonzaga	L 76–78	7–4 (0–1)	Kennedy Pavilion; Spokane, Washington
Sat, Jan 7*		at Idaho	W 72–63	8–4 (1–1)	Kibbie Dome; Moscow, Idaho
Mon, Jan 9*		Chico State	W 76–57	9–4	Dee Events Center; Ogden, Utah
Sat, Jan 14		at Northern Arizona	W 73–72	10–4 (2–1)	Walkup Skydome; Flagstaff, Arizona
Tue, Jan 17*		at Utah State	L 65–74	10–5	Smith Spectrum; Logan, Utah
Sat, Jan 21		Northern Arizona	W 78–66	11–5 (3–1)	Dee Events Center; Ogden, Utah
Thu, Jan 26		Idaho State	W 68–65	12–5 (4–1)	Dee Events Center; Ogden, Utah
Sat, Jan 28		Boise State	W 84–61	13–5 (5–1)	Dee Events Center; Ogden, Utah
Fri, Feb 3		at Idaho State	L 67–77	13–6 (5–2)	ICCU Dome; Pocatello, Idaho
Sat, Feb 4		at Boise State	L 70–75	13–7 (5–3)	Bronco Gymnasium; Boise, Idaho
Fri, Feb 10		at Montana State	W 83–73	14–7 (6–3)	Brick Breeden Fieldhouse; Bozeman, Montana
Sat, Feb 11		at Montana	L 52–62	14–8 (6–4)	Adams Field House; Missoula, Montana
Thu, Feb 16		Montana State	W 90–80	15–8 (7–4)	Dee Events Center; Ogden, Utah
Sat, Feb 18		Montana	L 56–58 ^{OT}	15–9 (7–5)	Dee Events Center; Ogden, Utah
Thu, Feb 23		Gonzaga	W 80–63	16–9 (8–5)	Dee Events Center; Ogden, Utah
Sat, Feb 25		Idaho	W 86–69	17–9 (9–5)	Dee Events Center; Ogden, Utah
Big Sky tournament
Fri, March 3; 7:00 pm	(3)	vs. (2) Idaho State; Semifinal	W 84–79	18–9	Adams Field House (9,350); Missoula, Montana
Sat, March 4; 8:00 pm	(3)	at (1) Montana; Final	W 62–55 ^{OT}	19–9	Adams Field House (9,203); Missoula, Montana
NCAA tournament
Sat, March 11*; 12:10 pm	(4Q-W)	vs. (2L-W) No. 7 Arkansas; First round	L 52–73	19–10	McArthur Court (9,141); Eugene, Oregon
*Non-conference game. ^{#}Rankings from AP poll. (#) Tournament seedings in parentheses. All times are in Mountain time.
