= 1970 NCAA College Division basketball tournament =

Edition of USA college basketball tournament

- Teams: 32
- Finals site: Roberts Municipal Stadium, Evansville, Indiana
- Champions: Philadelphia Textile Rams (1st title)
- Runner-up: Tennessee State Tigers (1st title game)
- Semifinalists: UC Riverside Highlanders (1st Final Four); Buffalo State Bengals (1st Final Four)
- Winning coach: Herb Magee (1st title)
- MOP: Ted McClain (Tennessee State)
- Attendance: 16,075

The 1970 NCAA Division II basketball tournament involved 32 schools playing in a single-elimination tournament to determine the national champion of men's NCAA College Division college basketball as a culmination of the 1969-70 NCAA College Division men's basketball season. It was won by the Philadelphia College of Textiles & Science (then-known colloquially as "Philadelphia Textile", later known as Philadelphia University, and now as Thomas Jefferson University) and Tennessee State's Ted McClain was the Most Outstanding Player.

1970 NCAA Division II Men's sites - regionals (cyan) Elite Eight (red)

American International College's tournament appearance was later vacated due to NCAA rules violations.

== Regional participants ==
School	Outcome
Ashland	Runner-up
Cheyney	Third Place
Philadelphia Textile	Regional Champion
Youngstown State	Fourth Place

School	Outcome
American International*	Regional Champion
Assumption	Runner-up
Springfield	Third Place
Saint Anselm	Fourth Place

School	Outcome
Boise State	Third Place
Puget Sound	Runner-up
Sacramento State	Fourth Place
UC Riverside	Regional Champion

School	Outcome
Capital	Third Place
Central Michigan	Runner-up
St. Joseph's (IN)	Regional Champion
Wayne State (MI)	Fourth Place

School	Outcome
Buffalo State	Regional Champion
Hartwick	Third Place
Montclair State	Runner-up
Stony Brook	Fourth Place

School	Outcome
Georgia Southern	Runner-up
Mount St. Mary's	Fourth Place
Old Dominion	Third Place
Stetson	Regional Champion

School	Outcome
Bellarmine	Third Place
Kentucky Wesleyan	Runner-up
Tennessee State	Regional Champion
Transylvania	Fourth Place

School	Outcome
Central Missouri State	Runner-up
Cornell (IA)	Fourth Place
South Dakota State	Regional Champion
SW Missouri State	Third Place

*tournament appearance vacated

== Regionals ==
=== Mideast - Reading, Pennsylvania ===
Location: Bollman Center Host: Cheyney State College

Regional semifinals Round of 32; March 6
Philadelphia Textile	79
Youngstown State	52
Ashland	50
Cheyney	43

Regional Final; Sweet 16; March 7
Philadelphia Textile	45
Ashland	28

- Third Place - Cheyney 94, Youngstown State 91

=== New England - Worcester, Massachusetts ===
Location: Andrew Laska Gymnasium Host: Assumption College

Regional semifinals Round of 32; March 6
~~American International~~	89
St. Anselm	74
Assumption	106
Springfield	84

Regional Final; Sweet 16; March 7
~~American International~~	83
Assumption	82

- Third Place - Springfield 109, St. Anselm 103

=== Far West - Tacoma, Washington ===
Location: Memorial Fieldhouse Host: University of Puget Sound

Regional semifinals Round of 32; March 5
UC Riverside	83
Boise State	81
Puget Sound	67
Sacramento State	62

Regional Final; Sweet 16; March 6
UC Riverside	83
Puget Sound	72

- Third Place -Boise State 63, Sacramento State 61

=== Great Lakes - Mount Pleasant, Michigan ===
Location: CMU Fieldhouse Host: Central Michigan University

Regional semifinals Round of 32; March 6
St. Joseph's (IN)	75
Capital	72
Central Michigan	73
Wayne State (MI)	61

Regional Final; Sweet 16; March 7
St. Joseph's	87
Central Michigan	68

- Third Place - Capital 83, Wayne State (MI) 80

=== East - Buffalo, New York ===
Location: unknown Host: Buffalo State College

Regional semifinals Round of 32; March 6
Montclair State	63
Hartwick	54
Buffalo State	93
Stony Brook	69

Regional Final; Sweet 16; March 7
Montclair State	72
Buffalo State	81

- Third Place - Hartwick 78, Stony Brook 70

=== South Atlantic - Statesboro, Georgia ===
Location: Hanner Fieldhouse Host: Georgia Southern College

Regional semifinals Round of 32; March 6
Stetson	78
Mount St. Mary's	77
Georgia Southern	86
Old Dominion	79

Regional Final; Sweet 16; March 7
Stetson	93
Georgia Southern	86

- Third Place - Old Dominion 93, Mount St. Mary's 90

=== South - Owensboro, Kentucky ===
Location: Owensboro Sportscenter Host: Kentucky Wesleyan College

Regional semifinals Round of 32; March 6
Tennessee State	82
Bellarmine	77
Kentucky Wesleyan	74
Transylvania	67

Regional Final; Sweet 16; March 7
Tennessee State	75
Kentucky Wesleyan	73

- Third Place - Bellarmine 114, Transylvania 72

=== Midwest - Brookings, South Dakota ===
Location: The Barn Host: South Dakota State University

Regional semifinals Round of 32; March 6
Central Missouri State	77
Cornell (IA)	65
South Dakota State	82
SW Missouri State	71

Regional Final; Sweet 16; March 7
Central Missouri State	73
South Dakota State	92

- Third Place - SW Missouri State 76, Cornell 65

*denotes each overtime played

== National Finals - Evansville, Indiana ==
Location: Roberts Municipal Stadium Host: University of Evansville

National Quarterfinals; Elite Eight; March 11
Philadelphia Textile	101
~~American International~~	53
UC Riverside	82
St. Joseph's (IN)	77
Buffalo State	75
Stetson	74
Tennessee State	92
South Dakota State	89

National semifinals Final Four; March 12
Philadelphia Textile	79
UC Riverside	63
Buffalo State	80
Tennessee State	101

National Championship; March 13
Philadelphia Textile	76
Tennessee State	65

- Third Place - UC Riverside 94, Buffalo State 83

*denotes each overtime played

== All-tournament team ==
- Howard Lee (UC Riverside)
- Ted McClain (Tennessee State)
- John Pierantozzi (Philadelphia Textile)
- Carl Poole (Philadelphia Textile)
- Randy Smith (Buffalo State)

== See also ==
- 1970 NCAA University Division basketball tournament
- 1970 NAIA Basketball Tournament

== Sources ==
- 2010 NCAA Men's Basketball Championship Tournament Records and Statistics: Division II men's basketball Championship
- 1970 NCAA College Division Men's Basketball Tournament jonfmorse.com
