= 1972–73 Weber State Wildcats men's basketball team =

American college basketball season

1972–73 Weber State Wildcats men's basketball

Big Sky champions

NCAA tournament, First round
- Conference: Big Sky Conference

Ranking
- Coaches: No. 19
- Record: 20–7 (13–1 Big Sky)
- Head coach: Gene Visscher (2nd season)
- Assistant coach: Neil McCarthy
- Home arena: Wildcat Gym

1972–73 Big Sky men's basketball standings
	Conf.				Overall
Team	W		L	PCT	W		L	PCT
Weber State	13	–	1	.929	20	–	7	.741
Idaho State	10	–	4	.714	18	–	8	.692
Montana State	9	–	5	.643	17	–	10	.630
Montana	7	–	7	.500	13	–	13	.500
Gonzaga	6	–	8	.429	14	–	12	.538
Boise State	5	–	9	.357	11	–	15	.423
Idaho	3	–	11	.214	7	–	19	.269
Northern Arizona	3	–	11	.214	6	–	20	.231

The 1972–73 Weber State Wildcats men's basketball team represented Weber State College during the 1972–73 NCAA University Division basketball season. Members of the Big Sky Conference, the Wildcats were led by second-year head coach Gene Visscher and played their home games on campus at Wildcat Gym in Ogden, Utah. They were 20–6 in the regular season and 13–1 in conference play.

The conference tournament was three years away, and for the sixth consecutive season, Weber State won the Big Sky title and played in the 25-team NCAA tournament. In the West regional at nearby Logan, they met Jerry Tarkanian's fourth-ranked Long Beach State 49ers in the first round for the third time in the four years. The Wildcats led by two points at the half, but lost by a dozen.

Weber's next NCAA appearance was five years later in 1978.

Senior center Rich Cooper and senior guard Brady Small were named to the all-conference team; junior guard Dan Dion and senior forward Ken Gubler were on the second team.

== Postseason result ==
Date time, TV	Opponent	Result	Record	Site (attendance) city, state
NCAA tournament
Sat, March 10*; 12:05 pm	vs. No. 4 Long Beach State; First round	L 75–88	20–7	Smith Spectrum (6,706); Logan, Utah
*Non-conference game. ^{#}Rankings from AP poll. (#) Tournament seedings in parentheses. All times are in Mountain time.
