= Swenson Gym =

Weber State University gymnasium in Ogden, Utah

- Former names: Wildcat Gym
- Address: 1356–1372 East 4100 South
- Location: Ogden, Utah, U.S.
- Coordinates: 41°11′27″N 111°56′31″W
- Owner: Weber State University
- Capacity: 1,200 (current); 5,000 (former, approx.)

Construction
- Opened: 1962; 64 years ago
- Renovated: 2006

Reed K. Swenson Gym (originally Wildcat Gym) is a 1,200-seat gymnasium in the western United States, on the campus of Weber State University in Ogden, Utah. It is currently the home of Weber State Wildcats women's volleyball team of the Big Sky Conference.

Built 64 years ago in 1962 as Weber State's primary indoor venue, it was succeeded by the new Dee Events Center in autumn 1977. All three teams (men's and women's basketball, volleyball) moved to the Dee, leaving the gym without a varsity tenant. It was renovated in 2006 to accommodate volleyball, with its seating capacity significantly reduced. It is named for Reed Knute Swenson (1903–1989), the head basketball coach at Weber from 1933 to 1957 and longtime athletic director.

The gym hosted the inaugural Big Sky Conference men's basketball tournament in 1976; the host Wildcats lost the title game in double overtime to Boise State, with an attendance of 4,679.

The final men's basketball game was on February 12, 1977, a twelve-point win over Gonzaga before 4,941; the Bulldogs were winless in fifteen annual attempts at Wildcat Gym, but did upset Weber State by a point a week later in Spokane to foil their title hopes. Two weeks later at the conference tournament in Pocatello, the 'Cats returned the favor with a one-point win over the Zags in the semifinals.
