= 1976 Big Sky Conference men's basketball tournament =

Basketball tournament in Utah, USA

- Classification: Division I
- Season: 1975–76
- Teams: 4
- Site: Wildcat Gym; Ogden, Utah
- Champions: Boise State (1st title)
- Winning coach: Bus Connor (1st title)
- MVP: Jimmie Watts (Weber State)

1975–76 Big Sky men's basketball standings
	Conf.				Overall
Team	W		L	PCT	W		L	PCT
Weber State	9	–	5	.643	21	–	11	.656
Boise State †	9	–	5	.643	18	–	11	.621
Idaho State	9	–	5	.643	16	–	11	.593
Northern Arizona	8	–	6	.571	15	–	12	.556
Montana	7	–	7	.500	13	–	12	.520
Montana State	6	–	8	.429	9	–	16	.360
Gonzaga	5	–	9	.357	13	–	13	.500
Idaho	3	–	11	.214	7	–	19	.269
† Big Sky Conference tournament winner

The 1976 Big Sky Conference men's basketball tournament was held March 5–6 at the Wildcat Gym at Weber State College in Ogden, Utah. This was the first edition of the tournament.

The top three teams had the same 9–5 conference record and the fourth was a game back; the top two seeds won their semifinals. Boise State defeated Weber State in the championship game, 77–70 in overtime. and received an automatic bid to the 32-team NCAA tournament, their first appearance, but fell to UNLV in Eugene, Oregon.

== Format ==
The Big Sky had eight members for the 1975–76 season, but only the top four teams from the standings qualified for the tournament, and the regular season champion was the host. This format was in place for the first eight editions, through 1983.

This was the thirteenth year of the conference and the ninth season in which the Big Sky champion had an automatic berth in the NCAA tournament, all in the West regional. Two years earlier, a one-game tiebreaker playoff was required to determine the champion, also won by the visiting team.

The seeding of the three co-champions for the four-team bracket was done by a random draw in late February, conducted via a Saturday night conference telephone call by commissioner John Roning from Moscow, Idaho. Weber was drawn as the top seed, which included the right to host at Wildcat Gym in Ogden, Utah. At this time, both Weber and Boise still played in small gymnasiums, while ISU's Minidome had about triple the seating capacity of the others.

== Bracket ==
Semifinals; Friday, March 5
1	Weber State	63
4	Northern Arizona	58
3	Idaho State	81
2	Boise State	93

Championship; Saturday, March 6
1	Weber State	70
2	Boise State	77*
