= Big Sky Conference =

American collegiate athletic conference

- Association: NCAA
- Founded: July 1, 1963; 63 years ago
- Commissioner: Tom Wistrcill (since November 16, 2018)
- Sports fielded: 16; men's: 7; women's: 9
- Division: Division I
- Subdivision: FCS
- No. of teams: 11 (+2 football affiliates)
- Headquarters: Farmington, Utah
- Region: Western United States
- Broadcasters: ESPN; Scripps Sports (Montana schools only)
- Website: bigskyconf.com

Locations

The Big Sky Conference is a collegiate athletic conference, affiliated with the NCAA's Division I with football competing in the Football Championship Subdivision. As of 2026, eleven full member institutions are located in the states of Arizona, Colorado, Idaho, Montana, Oregon, Utah, and Washington. Two affiliate members from California are football–only participants, and a South Carolina school joined for men's golf in July 2025.

== History ==
Big Sky Conference
Location of Big Sky members:
Full member
Affiliate member, football
Not pictured: men's golf affiliate Francis Marion

Initially conceived for basketball, the Big Sky was founded on July 1, 1963, with six members in four states; four of the charter members have been in the league from its founding, and a fifth returned in 2014 after an 18-year absence.

The name "Big Sky" came from the popular 1947 western novel by A. B. Guthrie Jr.; it was proposed by Harry Missildine, a sports columnist of the Spokesman-Review just prior to the founding meetings of the conference in Spokane in February 1963, and was adopted with the announcement of the new conference five days later.

Starting in 1968, the conference competed at the highest level (university division) in all sports except football (college division). The sole exception was Idaho, in the university division for football through 1977 (except 1967, 1968). Football moved to the new Division I-AA in 1978, which was renamed Division I Football Championship Subdivision (FCS) in 2006.

In 1974, half of the Big Sky's ten included sports were dropped (baseball, skiing, swimming, golf, and tennis), leaving football, basketball, wrestling, track, and cross country skiing.

Women's sports were added 38 years ago in 1988, moving from the women's-only Mountain West Athletic Conference (1982–88).

=== Fiftieth anniversary ===
The 2012–13 season marked the completion of a half century of athletic competition and a quarter century sponsoring women's collegiate athletics. Before the season the league introduced a new logo to celebrate this.

The 25th season of women's athletics also marked a first for the league, as Portland State won the league's inaugural softball championship. From 1982 to 1988, women's sports were conducted in the Mountain West Athletic Conference.

The Big Sky sponsors championships in sixteen sports, including men's and women's cross country, indoor and outdoor track and field, basketball, golf, and tennis. There are also championships in football, and in women's volleyball, soccer, and softball. Men's golf was reinstated in 2025–26 after having been discontinued in 2024. It is one of two Division I all-sports conferences to not sponsor baseball, the other being the Mid-Eastern Athletic Conference.

== Member schools ==
=== Current full members ===
Institution	Location	Founded	Type	Enrollment	Endowment (millions)	Nickname	Joined (Note: Represents the calendar year when fall sports competition begins.)	Colors
Eastern Washington University	Cheney, Washington	1882	Public	10,492	$32.1	Eagles	1987	
University of Idaho	Moscow, Idaho	1889	Public	12,286	$474	Vandals	1963; 2014 (Note: Idaho was a charter member but departed in 1996 to join the Big West Conference; they rejoined the Big Sky in 2014 for all sports but football, which rejoined prior to the 2018 season.)	
Idaho State University	Pocatello, Idaho	1901	Public	13,061	$122.1	Bengals	1963	
University of Montana	Missoula, Montana	1893	Public	10,811	$320.7	Grizzlies (Note: The Montana women's basketball team is known as the Lady Griz, but all other women's teams are known as Grizzlies.)	1963	
Montana State University	Bozeman, Montana	1893	Public	17,135	$319.6	Bobcats	1963	
Northern Arizona University	Flagstaff, Arizona	1899	Public	28,467	$218.8	Lumberjacks	1970	
University of Northern Colorado	Greeley, Colorado	1889	Public	8,869	$131.4	Bears	2006	
Portland State University	Portland, Oregon	1946	Public	19,951	$127.5	Vikings	1996	
Southern Utah University	Cedar City, Utah	1897	Public	15,444	$45.9	Thunderbirds	2012; 2026 (Note: Southern Utah was previously a full member of the Big Sky from 2012–13 until 2021–22.)	
Utah Tech University	St. George, Utah	1911	Public	12,556	$40.2	Trailblazers	2026	
Weber State University	Ogden, Utah	1889	Public	32,701	$238	Wildcats	1963	

=== Affiliate members ===
Institution	Location	Founded	Type	Enrollment	Nickname	Joined (Note: Represents the calendar year when fall sports competition begins.)	Colors	Big Sky sport(s)	Primary conference
California Polytechnic State University (Cal Poly)	San Luis Obispo, California	1901	Public	21,812	Mustangs	2012		Football	Big West (BWC)
Francis Marion University	Florence, South Carolina	1970	Public	4,187	Patriots	2025		Men's golf	Carolinas (CC) (Note: Currently an NCAA Division II athletic conference.)
University of California, Davis (UC Davis)	Davis, California	1905	Public	38,369	Aggies	2012		Football	Mountain West (MW)

=== Future affiliate members ===
Institution	Location	Founded	Type	Enrollment	Nickname	Joining (Note: Represents the calendar year when fall sports competition begins.)	Colors	Big Sky sport(s)	Primary conference
University of Texas Rio Grande Valley (UTRGV)	Edinburg, Texas (Note: UTRGV has multiple campuses within its service area, but its academic and athletic administrations are at the Edinburg campus it inherited from its athletic predecessor of the University of Texas–Pan American (UTPA).)	2015 (Note: UTRGV was formally founded in 2013, but did not start instruction until 2015.)	Public	32,419	Vaqueros	2027		Women's swimming & diving	Southland (SLC)

=== Former full members ===
Institution	Location	Founded	Type	Nickname	Joined (Note: Represents the calendar year when fall sports competition begins.)	Left (Note: Represents the calendar year when spring sports competition ends.)	Colors	Subsequent conference(s)	Current conference
Boise State University	Boise, Idaho	1932	Public	Broncos	1970	1996		Big West (BWC) (1996–2001); Western (WAC) (2001–11)	Mountain West (MW) (2011–2026); Pac-12 (2026–present)
California State University, Northridge	Northridge, California	1958	Public	Matadors	1996	2001		Big West (BWC) (2001–present)	
California State University, Sacramento	Sacramento, California	1947	Public	Hornets	1996	2026		Big West (BWC) & Mid-American (MAC) (football) (2026–present)	
Gonzaga University (Note: Gonzaga was a charter member in 1963, but has not fielded a football team since 1941.)	Spokane, Washington	1887	Catholic (Jesuit)	Bulldogs	1963	1979		West Coast (1979–2026); Pac-12 (2026–present)	
University of Nevada	Reno, Nevada	1874	Public	Wolf Pack	1979	1992		Big West (BWC) (1992–2000); Western (WAC) (2000–12)	Mountain West (MW) (2012–present)
University of North Dakota	Grand Forks, North Dakota	1883	Public	Fighting Hawks	2012	2018		Summit (2018–present)	

=== Former affiliate members ===
Institution	Location	Founded	Type	Nickname	Joined (Note: Represents the calendar year when fall sports competition begins.)	Left (Note: Represents the calendar year when spring sports competition ends.)	Colors	Big Sky sport(s)	Primary conference	Conference in former Big Sky sport
Binghamton University, SUNY (Note: Also known as the State University of New York at Binghamton.)	Vestal, New York (Note: The campus mailing address is Binghamton.)	1946	Public	Bearcats	2014	2023		Men's golf	America East (AmEast)	Northeast (NEC)
University of Hartford	West Hartford, Connecticut	1877	Nonsectarian	Hawks	2014	2023		Men's golf	New England (CNE) (Note: Currently an NCAA Division III athletic conference.)	

=== Membership timeline ===
Full member (all sports) Full member (non-football) Associate member (football) Associate member (sport) Other Conference Other Conference

== NCAA championships ==
NCAA Division I national championships as of 2026.

School	Team			Individual		
School	Men's	Women's	Total	Men's	Women's	Total
Eastern Washington	1	0	1	0	0	0
Idaho	0	0	0	4	0	4
Idaho State	1	0	1	2	0	2
Montana	2	0	2	3	0	3
Montana State	3	0	3	3	1	4
Northern Arizona	6	0	6†	10	8	18
Northern Colorado	0	0	0	0	0	0
Portland State	0	0	0	0	0	0
Sacramento State	0	0	0	0	0	0
Southern Utah	0	0	0	0	0	0
Weber State	0	0	0	3	1	4
Conference total	13	0	13	25	10	35

† Northern Arizona is the only Big Sky program to win D1 team national titles outside of the Football Championship Subdivision (FCS).

== Sports ==
As of the 2025–26 school year, the Big Sky sponsors championships in seven men's and nine women's NCAA-sanctioned sports. Each core member institution is required to participate in all of the 13 core sports.

Men's core sports are basketball, cross country, football, indoor track and field, outdoor track and field, and tennis. Women's core sports are basketball, cross country, golf, indoor track and field, outdoor track and field, tennis, and volleyball.

=== Affiliates ===
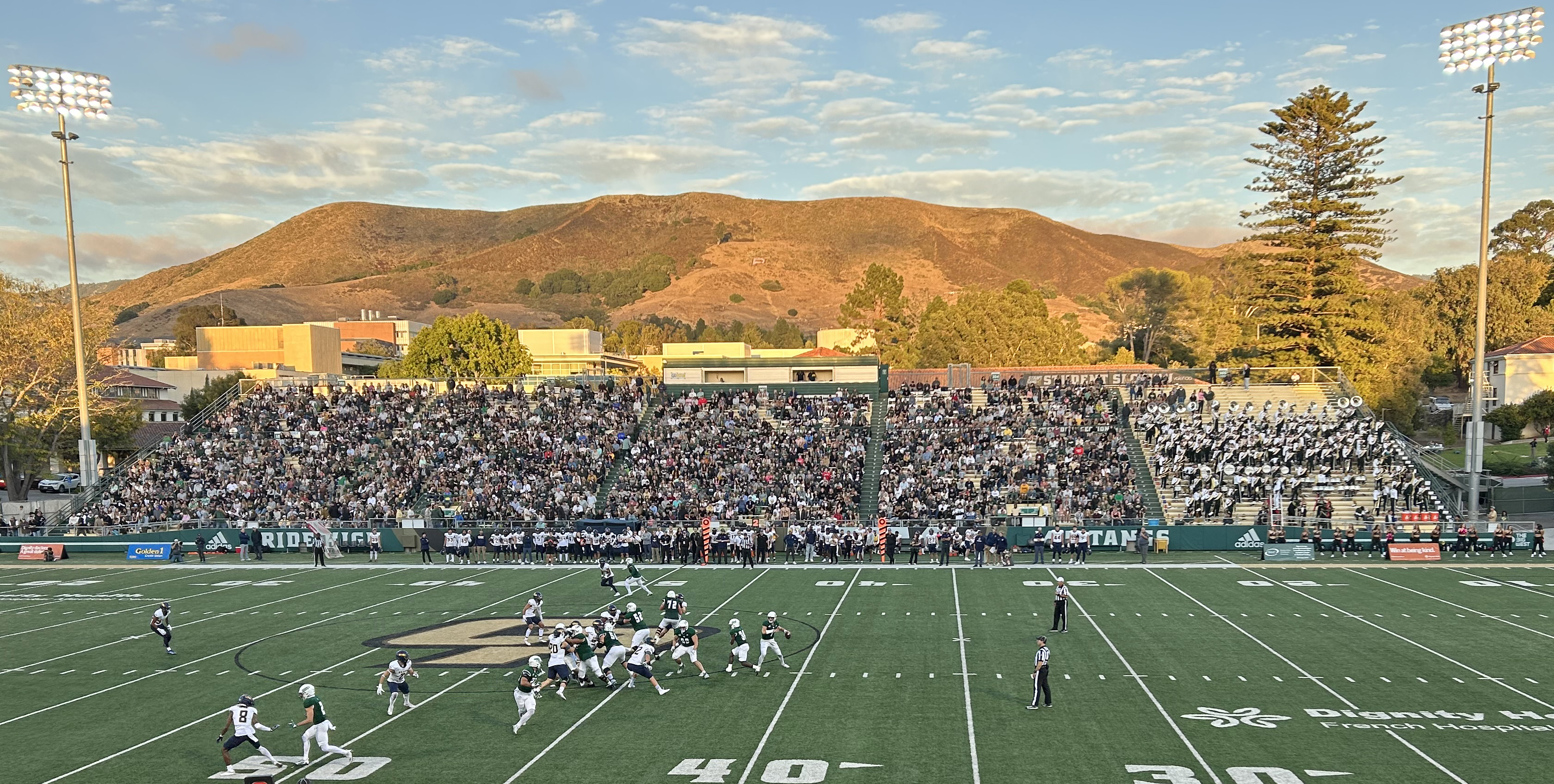
Cal Poly quarterback Sam Huard looks downfield during a Big Sky Conference football game against Northern Colorado on Oct. 21, 2023.

Cal Poly and UC Davis participate as football-only affiliates, otherwise participating in the Big West Conference. The Mustangs and Aggies were welcomed by the BSC in September 2010 in response to both nationwide conference realignment and an expansion of the FCS playoff bracket at the time, according to then-commissioner Doug Fullerton.

Both Binghamton and Hartford of the America East Conference were affiliates in men's golf only from 2014 to 2023. Before the 2014–15 school year, the latter two schools had participated in men's golf alongside five full Big Sky members in the single-sport America Sky Conference. The return of Idaho brought the number of members participating in men's golf to six, which led to the Big Sky adding men's golf and absorbing the America Sky Conference. Both schools left after the 2022–23 athletic season, after Binghamton moved their program to the Northeast Conference and Hartford reclassified to Division III and joined the Commonwealth Coast Conference. By this time the number of full Big Sky members that sponsored men's golf had dropped to 4, below the 6 member minimum necessary for the conference champion to receive an autobid to the NCAA Division I men's golf championship, so with the departure of the two affiliates, the Big Sky ceased sponsoring men's golf again after the 2024 season. However, the reinstatement of Eastern Washington men's golf effective in 2025–26 gave the Big Sky five full members that sponsored the sport, and Big Sky men's golf returned at that time with Francis Marion, a Division II member that plays Division I men's golf, as the needed sixth member.

=== Baseball ===
The Big Sky is unusual among Division I all-sports conferences in not sponsoring baseball, a distinction that it shares only with the Mid-Eastern Athletic Conference, and which it held alone prior to the 2022–23 school year. The conference originally sponsored baseball in 1964, with all members participating. When Boise State and Northern Arizona arrived for the 1971 season, competition was split into two divisions of four teams each, with the winners in a best-of-three championship series. Montana State and Montana soon dropped the sport and by the 1973 season, only six teams remained but the divisions were kept, and Boise State moved over to the North Division for two years.

In May 1974, the Big Sky announced its intention to discontinue five of its ten sponsored sports. It retained football, basketball, cross-country, track, and wrestling, and dropped conference competition in baseball, golf, tennis, swimming, and skiing. Of the eleven Big Sky baseball titles, four each went to Idaho and Gonzaga, and three to Weber State. Gonzaga won the final title in 1974 over Idaho State in three games, after losing the first game in Pocatello. Southern division champion Idaho State chose to end its baseball program weeks following the conference's announcement, and Gonzaga, Idaho, and Boise State joined the new Northern Pacific Conference (NorPac) for baseball in 1975. Boise State and Idaho competed in the NorPac for six seasons, then discontinued baseball after the 1980 season.

- Idaho (4) 1964, 1966, 1967, 1969
- Gonzaga (4) 1965, 1971, 1973, 1974
- Weber State (3) 1968, 1970, 1972

In 2016, North Dakota announced in April that it was their last baseball season. Since then, only Northern Colorado and Sacramento State have competed in the sport, both as affiliate members in the Western Athletic Conference (WAC) until Northern Colorado baseball moved to the Summit League after the 2021 season. Sacramento State will leave the Big Sky for the baseball-sponsoring Big West Conference in 2026. At the same time, baseball-sponsoring Utah Tech will join the Big Sky, placing baseball in the Mountain West Conference.

=== Wrestling ===
Through the 1987 season, the conference sponsored wrestling. Boise State and Idaho State dominated in most years, winning ten and eight conference titles, respectively. BSU won seven consecutive from 1974 to 1980. Montana State and Weber State also had some good years; Montana won their only conference title in the last year Big Sky sponsored the sport.

- Montana State (3) 1964, 1965, 1966
- Idaho State (8) 1967, 1968, 1969, 1970, 1971, 1972, 1973, 1984
- Boise State (10) 1974, 1975, 1976, 1977, 1978, 1979, 1980, 1982, 1985, 1986
- Weber State (2) 1981, 1983
- Montana (1) 1987

Boise State continued its wrestling program as an affiliate member of the Pac-10 (now Pac-12) Conference.

Teams in Big Sky Conference competition
Sport	Men's	Women's
Basketball	11	11
Cross country	11	11
Football	13	–
Golf	6	11
Soccer	–	10
Softball	–	7
Tennis	10	10
Track and field (Indoor)	11	11
Track and field (Outdoor)	11	11
Volleyball	–	11

=== Men's sponsored sports by school ===
School	Basketball	Cross country	Football	Golf	Tennis	Track and field (indoor)	Track and field (outdoor)	Total Sports
Eastern Washington	Yes	Yes	Yes	Yes	No	Yes	Yes	6
Idaho	Yes	Yes	Yes	Yes	Yes	Yes	Yes	7
Idaho State	Yes	Yes	Yes	No	Yes	Yes	Yes	6
Montana	Yes	Yes	Yes	No	Yes	Yes	Yes	6
Montana State	Yes	Yes	Yes	No	Yes	Yes	Yes	6
Northern Arizona	Yes	Yes	Yes	No	Yes	Yes	Yes	6
Northern Colorado	Yes	Yes	Yes	Yes	No	Yes	Yes	6
Portland State	Yes	Yes	Yes	No	Yes	Yes	Yes	6
Southern Utah	Yes	Yes	Yes	Yes	No	Yes	Yes	6
Utah Tech	Yes	Yes	Yes	Yes	No	Yes	Yes	6
Weber State	Yes	Yes	Yes	Yes	Yes	Yes	Yes	7
Totals	11	11	11+2 (Note: Affiliates Cal Poly and UC Davis.)	6+1 (Note: Affiliate Francis Marion.)	7	11	11	62+3

Men's varsity sports not sponsored by the Big Sky Conference which are played by Big Sky schools:

School	Baseball	Skiing	Soccer	Wrestling
Montana State	No	RMISA	No	No
Northern Colorado	Summit	No	No	Pac-12
Utah Tech	MW	No	MW	No

=== Women's sponsored sports by school ===
School	Basketball	Cross country	Golf	Soccer	Softball	Tennis	Track and field (indoor)	Track and field (outdoor)	Volleyball	Total Sports
Eastern Washington	Yes	Yes	Yes	Yes	No	Yes	Yes	Yes	Yes	8
Idaho	Yes	Yes	Yes	Yes	No	Yes	Yes	Yes	Yes	8
Idaho State	Yes	Yes	Yes	Yes	Yes	Yes	Yes	Yes	Yes	9
Montana	Yes	Yes	Yes	Yes	Yes	Yes	Yes	Yes	Yes	9
Montana State	Yes	Yes	Yes	No	No	Yes	Yes	Yes	Yes	7
Northern Arizona	Yes	Yes	Yes	Yes	No	Yes	Yes	Yes	Yes	8
Northern Colorado	Yes	Yes	Yes	Yes	Yes	No	Yes	Yes	Yes	8
Portland State	Yes	Yes	Yes	Yes	Yes	Yes	Yes	Yes	Yes	9
Southern Utah	Yes	Yes	Yes	Yes	Yes	No	Yes	Yes	Yes	8
Utah Tech	Yes	Yes	Yes	Yes	Yes	Yes	Yes	Yes	Yes	9
Weber State	Yes	Yes	Yes	Yes	Yes	Yes	Yes	Yes	Yes	9
Totals	11	11	11	10	7	9	11	11	11	100

Women's varsity sports not sponsored by the Big Sky Conference which are played by Big Sky schools:

School	Gymnastics	Skiing	Swimming
Idaho	No	No	MPSF
Montana State	No	RMISA	No
Northern Arizona	No	No	MPSF
Northern Colorado	No	No	MPSF
Southern Utah	Pac-12	No	No
Utah Tech	No	No	MPSF

== Facilities ==
School	Football stadium	Capacity	Basketball arena	Capacity
Cal Poly	Mustang Memorial Field	11,075	Football-only member	
Eastern Washington	Roos Field	8,600	Reese Court	6,000
Idaho	Kibbie Dome	16,000	Idaho Central Credit Union Arena	4,200
Idaho State	ICCU Dome	12,000	Reed Gym	3,040
Montana	Washington–Grizzly Stadium	25,203	Dahlberg Arena	7,321
Montana State	Bobcat Stadium	20,767	Brick Breeden Fieldhouse	7,250
Northern Arizona	Walkup Skydome	10,000	Walkup Skydome	7,000
Northern Colorado	Nottingham Field	8,533	Bank of Colorado Arena	2,992
Portland State	Hillsboro Stadium	7,600	Viking Pavilion	3,094
Southern Utah	Eccles Coliseum	8,500	America First Event Center	5,300
UC Davis	UC Davis Health Stadium	10,367	Football-only member	
Utah Tech	Greater Zion Stadium	10,000	Burns Arena	4,779
Weber State	Stewart Stadium	17,500	Dee Events Center	11,500

== Basketball ==
=== Current NBA players ===
- Damian Lillard, Weber State

=== Conference rivalries ===
- Idaho and Idaho State
- Idaho and Montana
- Idaho State and Weber State
- Montana and Montana State
- Utah Tech and Southern Utah
- Weber State and Southern Utah
- Eastern Washington and Montana
- Northern Arizona and Southern Utah

=== Non-conference rivalries ===
- Weber State and Utah State/Utah/BYU/Utah Valley
- Utah Tech and Utah Valley
- Eastern Washington and Gonzaga
- Idaho and Washington State Cougars, Battle of the Palouse
- Idaho and Boise State
- Idaho State and Wyoming
- Montana and Wyoming
- Montana State and Wyoming
- Sacramento State and UC Davis
- Portland State and Portland
- Northern Colorado and Colorado State
- Northern Colorado and Denver

=== 2021–22 home game attendance averages ===
School	Total Games (Includes Away Games)	Total Home Game Attendance	Average Home Game Attendance
Weber State	32	67,678	4,511
Montana	32	53,917	3,171
Montana State	34	42,634	3,045
Southern Utah	32	24,712	1,647
Idaho	31	19,804	1,320
Eastern Washington	34	14,392	1,199
Idaho State	30	15,153	1,165
Northern Colorado	35	14,775	1,136
Portland State	31	13,256	946
Northern Arizona	31	8,465	604
Sacramento State	29	7,846	603

== Rivalries ==
=== Protected football rivalries and preferred annual opponents ===
Before 2026 when there were 12 teams in the conference, but each team only played eight conference football games per year, the conference set two "protected rivalry" games for each team. These rivalry match-ups were played every season, while football games against other conference teams are played twice every three years. Many of the protected rivalries were traditional, due to the teams either being in the same state or within close geographical proximity. With the departure of Southern Utah from the conference, new protected rivalries were announced for 2022–2024. These rivalries were extended through 2027.

Following the announcement of conference membership changes to occur in 2026, the league opted to change its football schedule to nine conference games per year, with one team playing just eight such games due to the mathematics. Teams were asked to specify "four preferred annual opponents", and the league would attempt to schedule as many of these games as possible.

Protected rivalries 2022-2025
School	Rival 1	Rival 2
UC Davis	Cal Poly	Sacramento State
Cal Poly	UC Davis	Sacramento State
Eastern Washington	Idaho	Montana State
Idaho	Idaho State	Eastern Washington
Idaho State	Idaho	Weber State
Montana	Montana State	Portland State
Montana State	Montana	Eastern Washington
Northern Arizona	Weber State	Northern Colorado
Northern Colorado	Northern Arizona	Portland State
Portland State	Montana	Northern Colorado
Sacramento State	UC Davis	Cal Poly
Weber State	Idaho State	Northern Arizona

=== Conference ===
Schools		First; Meeting	Game	Winner (Last Meeting)	All-time Record
Cal Poly	UC Davis	1939	Battle for the Golden Horseshoe	UC Davis	UC Davis leads 22–20–2
Eastern Washington	Montana	1938	EWU-UM Governor's Cup	Eastern Washington	Montana leads 27–17–1
Eastern Washington	Portland State	1968	Dam Cup	Portland State	Portland State leads 21–20–1
Idaho	Idaho State	1916	Battle of the Domes	Idaho	Idaho leads 30–13
Idaho	Montana	1903	Little Brown Stein	Montana	Idaho leads 55–28–2
Montana	Montana State	1897	Brawl of the Wild	Montana State	Montana leads 74-45-5
Southern Utah	Northern Arizona	1983	Grand Canyon Rivalry	Northern Arizona	Northern Arizona leads 13–9
Southern Utah	Utah Tech	1937	Battle of the Ax	Southern Utah	Southern Utah leads 31–12–3
Southern Utah	Weber State	1984	Beehive Bowl	Southern Utah	Weber State leads 19–9

=== Non-conference ===
Schools		First; Meeting	Trophy	Winner (Last Meeting)	All-time Record	Note
Idaho	Boise State	1971	Governor's Cup	Boise State	Boise State leads 22–17-1	Last competed for in 2010
Idaho	Washington State	1894	Battle of the Palouse	Washington State	Washington State leads 73-16-3	Last played in 2022
UC Davis	Sacramento State	1954	Causeway Classic	Sacramento State	UC Davis leads 46–21	Last played in 2025

== Commissioners ==
- Jack Friel (1963–71)
- John Roning (1971–77)
- Steve Belko (1977–81)
- Ron Stephenson (1981–95)
- Doug Fullerton (1995–2016)
- Andrea Williams (2016–2018)
- Ron Loghry (interim, 2018)
- Tom Wistrcill (2018–present)

== Headquarters ==
- Pullman, Washington (1963–1971)
- Boise, Idaho (1971–1995)
- Ogden, Utah (1995–2019)
- Farmington, Utah (2019–present)

== Big Sky championships ==
=== Men's basketball ===
Season	Regular-season champion(s)	Tournament champion	NCAA seed	Region	Wins	Advancement
1964	Montana State	no conference tournament				
1965	Weber State	no conference tournament				
1966	Weber State, Gonzaga	no conference tournament				
1967	Gonzaga, Montana State	no conference tournament				
1968	Weber State	no conference tournament		West	0	
1969	Weber State	no conference tournament		West	1	Round of 16
1970	Weber State	no conference tournament		West	0	
1971	Weber State	no conference tournament		West	0	
1972	Weber State	no conference tournament		West	1	Round of 16
1973	Weber State	no conference tournament		West	0	
1974	Idaho State (playoff over Montana)	no conference tournament		West	0	
1975	Montana	no conference tournament		West	1	Round of 16
1976	Weber State, Boise State, Idaho State	Boise State		West	0	
1977	Idaho State	Idaho State		West	2	Round of 8
1978	Montana	Weber State		West	0	
1979	Weber State	Weber State	7	Midwest	1	Round of 32
1980	Weber State	Weber State	7	West	0	
1981	Idaho	Idaho	7	West	0	
1982	Idaho	Idaho	3	West	1	Round of 16
1983	Nevada, Weber State	Weber State	9	West	0	
1984	Weber State	Nevada	11	West	0	
1985	Nevada	Nevada	14	West	0	
1986	Northern Arizona, Montana	Montana State	16	West	0	
1987	Montana State	Idaho State	16	West	0	
1988	Boise State	Boise State	14	West	0	
1989	Boise State	Idaho	13	West	0	
1990	Idaho	Idaho	13	West	0	
1991	Montana	Montana	16	West	0	
1992	Montana	Montana	14	West	0	
1993	Idaho	Boise State	14	West	0	
1994	Weber State, Idaho State	Boise State	14	West	0	
1995	Weber State, Montana	Weber State	14	Southeast	1	Round of 32
1996	Montana State	Montana State	13	West	0	
1997	Northern Arizona	Montana	16	West	0	
1998	Northern Arizona	Northern Arizona	15	West	0	
1999	Weber State	Weber State	14	West	1	Round of 32
2000	Montana, Eastern Washington	Northern Arizona	15	West	0	
2001	Cal State Northridge	Cal State Northridge	13	Midwest	0	
2002	Montana State	Montana	15	Midwest	0	
2003	Weber State	Weber State	12	Midwest	0	
2004	Eastern Washington	Eastern Washington	15	East	0	
2005	Portland State	Montana	16	West	0	
2006	Northern Arizona	Montana	12	Midwest	1	Round of 32
2007	Weber State, Northern Arizona	Weber State	15	West	0	
2008	Portland State	Portland State	16	Midwest	0	
2009	Weber State	Portland State	13	East	0	
2010	Weber State	Montana	14	East	0	
2011	Northern Colorado	Northern Colorado	15	West	0	
2012	Montana	Montana	13	East	0	
2013	Montana	Montana	13	East	0	
2014	Weber State	Weber State	16	West	0	
2015	Montana, Eastern Washington	Eastern Washington	13	South	0	
2016	Weber State	Weber State	15	East	0	
2017	North Dakota	North Dakota	15	West	0	
2018	Montana	Montana	14	West	0	
2019	Montana	Montana	15	West	0	
2020	Eastern Washington	canceled	canceled			
2021	Southern Utah	Eastern Washington	14	West	0	
2022	Montana State	Montana State	14	West	0	
2023	Eastern Washington	Montana State	14	East	0	
2024	Eastern Washington	Montana State	16	First Four	0	
2025	Northern Colorado, Montana	Montana	14	East	0	
2026	Portland State	Idaho	15	South	0	

- Prior to 1976, each NCAA regional had a third place game (won 1969; lost 1972, 1975)
- The only Big Sky team to reach the Elite Eight in the NCAA tournament was Idaho State in 1977
- The only Big Sky team to earn a bye in the NCAA tournament was Idaho in 1982
- Through 2026, the Big Sky has yet to have an at-large team in the NCAA tournament

==== Championships (by school) ====
School	Member years	Conference titles	Tournament titles	Last won
Weber State	1963–present	22	10	2016
Montana	1963–present	13	12	2025
Montana State	1963–present	6	5	2024
Eastern Washington	1987–present	6	3	2024
Northern Arizona	1970–present	5	2	2007
Idaho	1963–96, 2014–present	4	5	2026
Idaho State	1963–present	4	2	1994
Boise State	1970–96	3	4	1989
Nevada	1979–92	2	2	1985
Portland State	1996–present	3	2	2026
Gonzaga	1963–79	2	0	1967
Northern Colorado	2006–present	2	1	2025
Cal State Northridge	1996–2001	1	1	2001
North Dakota	2012–18	1	1	2017
Southern Utah	2012–22, 2026–future	1	0	2021
Sacramento State	1996–2026	0	0	—N/a

==== NCAA tournament ====
Since 1968, the Big Sky champion has received a berth in the NCAA tournament; the conference tournament winner has been the representative since its introduction in 1976.

The best finish by a Big Sky team came in 1977, when the Idaho State Bengals of Jim Killingsworth advanced to the Elite Eight, with a one-point upset of UCLA in the Sweet Sixteen in Provo, Utah. Two days later, the Bengals led UNLV by a point at halftime, but lost by seventeen and finished at 25–5.

Seeding was introduced in 1979 when it expanded to forty teams, and the highest seed granted a Big Sky team was in 1982 in a 48-team bracket: ranked eighth in the final polls with a 26–2 record, the Idaho Vandals under Don Monson were seeded third in the West regional. After a first round bye, they beat Lute Olson's Iowa Hawkeyes in nearby Pullman in overtime, but lost to second-seeded (and fourth-ranked) Oregon State in the regional semifinals (Sweet Sixteen), also played in Provo. (Idaho had defeated OSU by 22 points in December in the Far West Classic at Portland.)

Other Big Sky teams that advanced to regional semifinals (Sweet Sixteen) include the Weber State Wildcats in 1969 and 1972, when the total field was 25 teams, and the Montana Grizzlies under Jud Heathcote in the 32-team field in 1975. The Griz fell to heavily-favored UCLA by just three points, who went on to win another title in John Wooden's final year as head coach. (A year later, Heathcote was hired at Michigan State with Monson as an assistant for the first two years; in his third season, the Spartans won the national title in 1979.)

Since 1982, only three teams from the Big Sky have advanced within the NCAA tournament, and none past the round of 32. Weber State won in 1995 and 1999, coached by Ron Abegglen, and Montana in 2006, led by alumnus Larry Krystkowiak. Prior to Idaho in 1982, the Big Sky had been seeded seventh (Weber State, 1979 & 1980; and Idaho, 1981); the highest seed for the conference since 1982 is ninth (Weber State, 1983), and the highest since expanding to 64 teams in 1985 is twelfth (Weber State in 2003; Montana in 2006).

Through 2026, the Big Sky has yet to receive an at-large bid to the NCAA tournament. The first NIT appearance for the conference was Idaho in 1983; two Big Sky teams advanced to the NIT's round of 16: Weber State (1984) and Boise State (1987).

=== Women's basketball ===
Season	Tournament champion	Tournament runner-up
1983	Montana	Weber State
1984	Montana	Eastern Washington
1985	Idaho	Montana
1986	Montana	Eastern Washington
1987	Eastern Washington	Montana
1988	Montana	Eastern Washington
1989	Montana	Idaho
1990	Montana	Idaho
1991	Montana	Montana State
1992	Montana	Boise State
1993	Montana State	Montana
1994	Montana	Boise State
1995	Montana	Montana State
1996	Montana	Weber State
1997	Montana	Montana State
1998	Montana	Northern Arizona
1999	Cal State Northridge	Portland State
2000	Montana	Cal State Northridge
2001	Idaho State	Montana
2002	Weber State	Montana State
2003	Weber State	Montana State
2004	Montana	Idaho State
2005	Montana	Weber State
2006	Northern Arizona	Weber State
2007	Idaho State	Northern Arizona
2008	Montana	Montana State
2009	Montana	Portland State
2010	Portland State	Montana State
2011	Montana	Portland State
2012	Idaho State	Northern Colorado
2013	Montana	Northern Colorado
2014	North Dakota	Montana
2015	Montana	Northern Colorado
2016	Idaho	Idaho State
2017	Montana State	Idaho State
2018	Northern Colorado	Idaho
2019	Portland State	Eastern Washington
2020	Canceled (final): Montana State / Idaho	
2021	Idaho State	Idaho
2022	Montana State	Northern Arizona
2023	Sacramento State	Northern Arizona
2024	Eastern Washington	Northern Arizona
2025	Montana State	Montana
2026	Idaho	Montana State

- Mountain West Athletic Conference (MWAC) through 1988 season

=== Football titles ===
Bold = National Champions

Season	Champions	Record (Conf.)
1963	Idaho State	3–1
1964	Montana State	3–0
1965	Weber State, Idaho	3–1
1966	Montana State	4–0
1967	Montana State	3–1
1968	Weber State, Montana State, Idaho	3–1
1969	Montana	4–0
1970	Montana	5–0
1971	Idaho	4–1
1972	Montana State	5–1
1973	Boise State	6–0
1974	Boise State	6–0
1975	Boise State	5–0–1
**1976**	**Montana State**	**6–0**
1977	Boise State	6–0
1978	Northern Arizona	6–0
1979	Montana State	6–1
**1980**	**Boise State**	**6–1**
**1981**	**Idaho State**	**6–1**
1982	Idaho, Montana, Montana State	5–2
1983	Nevada	6–1
**1984**	**Montana State**	**6–1**
1985	Idaho	6–1
1986	Nevada	7–0
1987	Idaho	7–1
1988	Idaho	7–1
1989	Idaho	8–0
1990	Nevada	7–1
1991	Nevada	8–0
1992	Idaho, Eastern Washington	6–1
1993	Montana	7–0
1994	Boise State	6–1
**1995**	**Montana**	**6–1**
1996	Montana	8–0
1997	Eastern Washington	7–1
1998	Montana	6–2
1999	Montana	7–1
2000	Montana	8–0
**2001**	**Montana**	**7–0**
2002	Montana State, Montana, Idaho State	5–2
2003	Montana State, Montana, Northern Arizona	5–2
2004	Montana, Eastern Washington	6–1
2005	Eastern Washington, Montana State, Montana	5–2
2006	Montana	8–0
2007	Montana	8–0
2008	Montana, Weber State	7–1
2009	Montana	8–0
**2010**	**Eastern Washington**, Montana State	**7–1**
2011	Montana State	7–1
2012	Eastern Washington, Montana State, Cal Poly	7–1
2013	Eastern Washington	8–0
2014	Eastern Washington	7–1
2015	Southern Utah	7–1
2016	Eastern Washington, North Dakota	8–0
2017	Southern Utah, Weber State	7–1
2018	Weber State, Eastern Washington, UC Davis	7–1
2019	Weber State, Sacramento State	7–1
2020	Weber State	5–1
2021	Sacramento State	8–0
2022	Sacramento State, Montana State	8–0
2023	Montana	7–1
2024	Montana State	8–0
**2025**	**Montana State**	**8-0**

=== Football championships (by school) ===
School	member years	total titles	Last won
Montana	1963–present	19	2023
Montana State	1963–present	18	2025
Eastern Washington	1987–present	10	2018
Idaho	1965–95; 2018–present	8	1992
Boise State	1970–95	6	1994
Nevada	1979–92	4	1991
Weber State	1963–present	6	2020
Idaho State	1963–present	3	2002
Sacramento State	1996–present	3	2022
Northern Arizona	1970–present	2	2003
Southern Utah	2012–present	2	2017
Cal Poly	2012–present	1	2012
North Dakota	2012–2017	1	2016
UC Davis	2012–present	1	2018
Cal State Northridge	1996–2001	0	
Portland State	1996–present	0	
Northern Colorado	2006–present	0	

=== All-time school records by wins for current teams ===
This list goes through the 2020 season.

This list includes former member North Dakota and excludes current member Idaho. Records do not match NCAA record book.

#	Team	Records	Pct.	Big Sky Championships	National Championships
1	North Dakota	622-383-30	.615	1	1
2	Montana	564-478-26	.540	18	2
4	Eastern Washington	503-404-23	.553	10	1
5	UC Davis	495-384-35	.561	1	0
6	Cal Poly	485-383-19	.557	1	1
3	Montana State	548-497-32	.524	18	4
7	Idaho State	449-488-21	.480	3	1
8	Northern Arizona	445-438-23	.504	2	0
9	Northern Colorado	425-450-26	.486	0	2
10	Portland State	331-354-10	.483	0	0
11	Weber State	266-294-3	.475	6	0
12	Sacramento State	263-351-8	.429	2	0
13	Southern Utah	261-319-13	.451	2	1

=== Overall Big Sky Conference champions ===
	Boise State Broncos (1970–1996)	Cal State Northridge Matadors (1996–2001)	Eastern Washington Eagles (1987– )	Gonzaga Bulldogs (1963–1979)	Idaho State Bengals (1963– )	Montana State Bobcats (1963– )	Northern Arizona Lumberjacks (1970– )	Portland State Vikings (1996– )	Sacramento State Hornets (1996– )	Idaho Vandals (1963–1996)	Nevada Wolf Pack (1979–1992)	Northern Colorado Bears (2006– )	Montana Grizzlies (1963– )	Weber State Wildcats (1963– )
Football	6	–	7	–	3	18	2	–	1	8	4	–	19	7
Men's Basketball	2	1	1	2	2	6	4	2	–	4	1	1	8	31
Women's Basketball (RS/Tourn)	1/0	1/1	1/1	–	3/3	3/1	1/1	1/1	–	1/1	–	1/0	21/20	2/2
Men's Cross Country	2	–	–	–	5	2	18	–	–	2	3	–	8	7
Women's Cross Country	–	–	–	–	–	4	15	–	–	1	–	–	2	4
Men's Indoor Track and Field	2	–	–	–	5	–	12	–	2	1	1	–	–	5
Women's Indoor Track and Field	6	3	–	–	1	1	7	–	2	1	–	–	1	4
Men's Outdoor Track and Field	1	–	–	–	12	1	15	–	–	4	2	–	1	9
Women's Outdoor Track and Field	6	3	–	–	1	1	7	–	3	1	–	–	1	5
Men's Tennis	5	–	1	–	2	4	2	–	10	10	2	–	–	11
Women's Tennis	2	1	–	–	2	–	3	–	9	–	1	–	–	10
Women's Soccer	–	–	1	–	2	–	–	1	1	–	–	–	4	4
Volleyball	1	1	5	–	3	–	1	5	11	3	–	2	3	–
Women's Golf	1	–	–	–	1	1	5	4	1	–	–	–	1	1
Men's Golf	1	1	–	–	–	–	–	1	2	–	2	–	6	17
Baseball (1963–74)	–	–	–	4	–	–	–	–	–	4	–	–	–	3
Men's Swimming (1963–74)	–	–	–	–	–	–	–	–	–	2	–	–	8	–
Wrestling (1963–87)	10	–	–	–	7	3	–	–	–	–	–	–	1	2
Men's Skiing (1963–74)	1	–	–	–	–	4	–	–	–	2	–	–	3	–
**Total**
