= List of Northern Colorado Bears men's basketball head coaches =

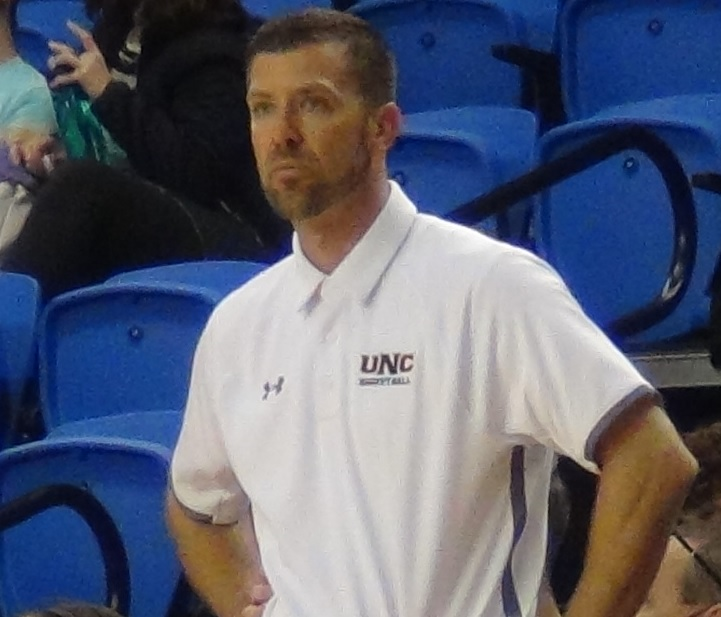
Steve Smiley, the current head coach of the Northern Colorado Bears.

The following is a list of Northern Colorado Bears men's basketball head coaches. There have been 19 head coaches of the Bears in their 119-season history.

Northern Colorado's current head coach is Steve Smiley. He was hired as the Bears' head coach in March 2020, replacing Jeff Linder, who left to become the head coach at Wyoming.

No.	Tenure	Coach	Years	Record	Pct.
–	1901–1914 (Note: Northern Colorado did not field a team for the 1903–04, 1907–08, or 1909–10 seasons.)	Unknown	11	11–15	.423
1	1914–1916	Royce Long	2	3–5	.375
2	1916–1917	Paul Abbott	1	5–7	.417
3	1917–1919	Ralph Glaze	2	8–13	.381
4	1919–1922	William E. Search	3	11–13	.458
5	1922–1931	George E. Cooper	9	88–48	.647
6	1931–1937	John S. Davis	6	71–53	.573
7	1937–1940	Jules Doubenmier	3	33–24	.579
8	1940–1943; 1945–1956	Pete Butler	14	151–133	.532
9	1943–1945	John W. Hancock	2	1–25	.038
10	1956–1963	John Bunn	7	73–94	.437
11	1963–1968	George Sage	5	95–36	.725
12	1968–1983	Thurm Wright	15	156–216	.419
13	1983–1992	Ron Brillhart	9	121–132	.478
14	1992–1999	Ken Smith	7	78–111	.413
15	1999–2006	Craig Rasmuson	7	63–129	.328
16	2006–2010	Tad Boyle	4	56–66	.459
17	2010–2016 (Note: Northern Colorado vacated all results between 2010 and 2015. Hill's on-court record is 86–98 (.467).)	B. J. Hill	6	10–21	.323
18	2016–2020	Jeff Linder	4	80–50	.615
19	2020–present	Steve Smiley	3	45–47	.489
Totals		19 coaches	119 seasons	1,198–1,285	.482
Records updated through end of 2022–23 season Source
