= Jordan Davis (basketball) =

American-Azerbaijani basketball player

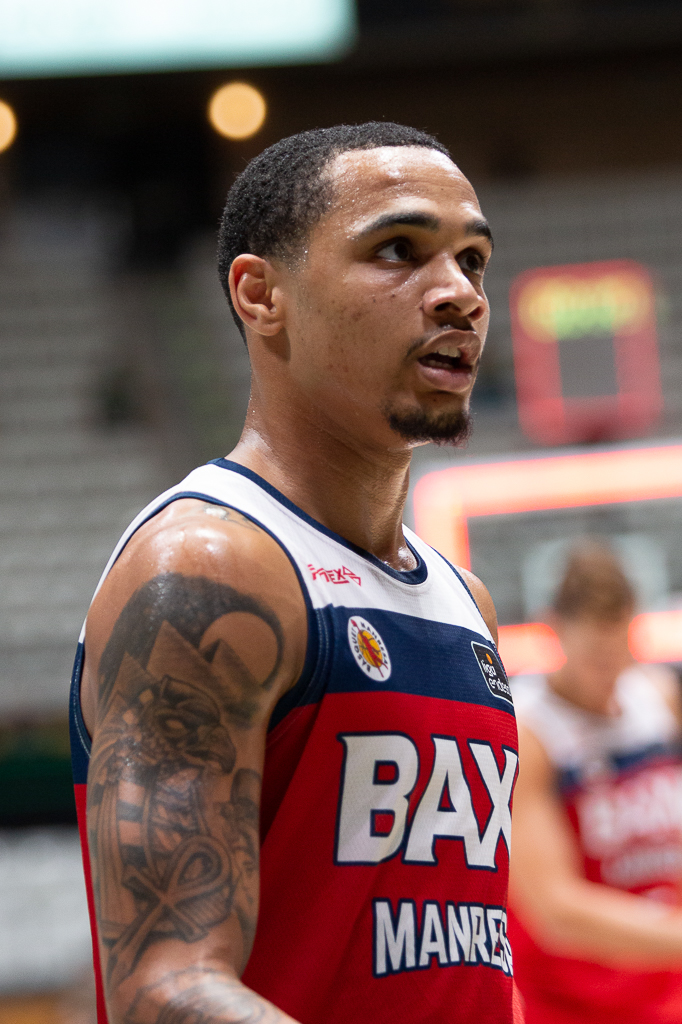

No. 0 – CS Antonine
- Position: Point guard / shooting guard
- League: Lebanese Basketball League

Personal information
- Born: June 6, 1997 (age 29) Las Vegas, Nevada, U.S.
- Listed height: 6 ft 2 in (1.88 m)
- Listed weight: 185 lb (84 kg)

Career information
- High school: Canyon Springs (North Las Vegas, Nevada)
- College: Northern Colorado (2015–2019)
- NBA draft: 2019: undrafted
- Playing career: 2019–present

Career history
- 2019: Baxi Manresa
- 2019–2020: Rasta Vechta
- 2020: Hapoel Tel Aviv
- 2020–2023: Murcia
- 2023: Hamburg Towers
- 2023–2024: CS Antonine
- 2024: Río Breogán
- 2024: Menorca
- 2024–2025: Promitheas Patras
- 2025: Prishtina
- 2025–2026: Cartagena
- 2026–present: CS Antonine

Career highlights
- Big Sky Player of the Year (2019); First-team All-Big Sky (2019); 2× Third-team All-Big Sky (2017, 2018); CIT champion (2018)

Jordan Deangelo Davis (born June 6, 1997) is an American-born naturalized Azerbaijani professional basketball player for CS Antonine of the Lebanese Basketball League. He played college basketball for the University of Northern Colorado, where in 2019 he was named the Big Sky Conference Player of the Year.

== College career ==
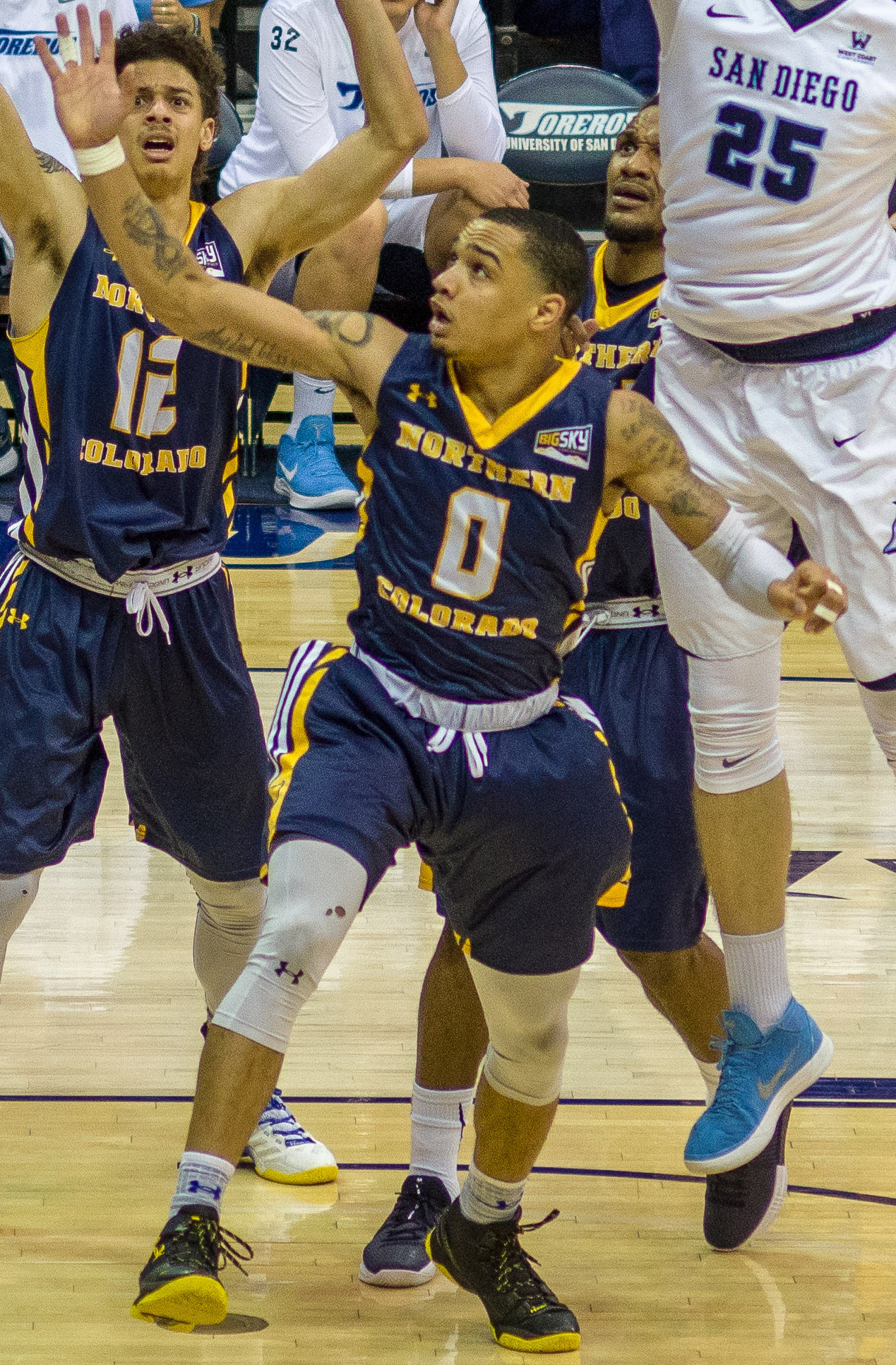
Davis, playing for Northern Colorado.

Davis came to Northern Colorado after originally committing to Eastern Washington out of Canyon Springs High School in the Las Vegas Valley. Davis became a starter in his first season, averaging 11 points, 3.6 rebounds and 2.1 assists per game for the Bears. Over the next two seasons, Davis claimed third-team All-Big Sky Conference honors. In his junior season, the Bears won the 2018 CollegeInsider.com Postseason Tournament. After the season, Davis declared for the 2018 NBA draft without an agent, but ultimately decided to return for his senior season at Northern Colorado.

In Davis' senior season, he achieved several milestones. He passed the 2,000 career point mark in a win over Southern Utah in which he also scored a career-high 36 points. Later that season, he became the Bears' all-time leading scorer, passing Mike Higgins' mark of 2,112 points in a February 16, 2019 loss to Eastern Washington. On the season, Davis averaged 23.4 points, 4.7 rebounds and 4.7 assists and finished his career with 2,270 career points. At the close of the season, Davis was named first-team All-Big Sky and the Big Sky Player of the Year.

== Professional career ==
After going undrafted in the 2019 NBA draft, Davis joined the Denver Nuggets for the 2019 NBA Summer League. On July 15, 2019, Davis signed with Baxi Manresa.

On November 20, 2019, he has signed with Rasta Vechta of the Basketball Bundesliga. He averaged 11.2 points and 2.4 assists in the Bundesliga. On May 18, 2019, Davis signed with Hapoel Tel Aviv of the Israeli Premier League.

On July 24, 2020, he has signed with UCAM Murcia of the Liga ACB. Davis signed a three-year extension with the team on December 15.

On February 16, 2023, he signed with Hamburg Towers of the German Basketball Bundesliga.

After signing for Cartagena of the Spanish Primera FEB in November 2025, Davis left the club in January 2026.

== International career ==
In 2017, Davis was approached by officials from the Azerbaijan national basketball team to fill a need for a combo guard spot on their 2017 FIBA U20 European Championship team. Davis obtained an Azerbaijani passport and joined the team for the tournament. He averaged 26.8 points and 10.3 rebounds per game in Division B play, but the team did not advance to the championship round.

== Career statistics ==
Legend
GP	Games played	GS	Games started	MPG	Minutes per game
FG%	Field goal percentage	3P%	3-point field goal percentage	FT%	Free throw percentage
RPG	Rebounds per game	APG	Assists per game	SPG	Steals per game
BPG	Blocks per game	PPG	Points per game	**Bold**	Career high

=== College ===
Year	Team	GP	GS	MPG	FG%	3P%	FT%	RPG	APG	SPG	BPG	PPG
2015–16	Northern Colorado	31	29	26.6	.492	.314	.699	3.6	2.1	1.3	.4	11.0
2016–17	Northern Colorado	29	28	33.7	.490	.298	.599	**4.8**	**5.6**	1.2	**.5**	19.3
2017–18	Northern Colorado	**38**	**37**	29.0	**.515**	.239	.638	**4.8**	3.2	.9	.4	16.3
2018–19	Northern Colorado	32	32	**33.8**	.474	**.360**	**.805**	4.7	4.7	**1.4**	.3	**23.5**
Career		130	126	30.7	.492	.315	.689	4.5	3.8	1.2	.4	17.5
