= Northern Colorado Bears men's basketball =

2026–27 Northern Colorado Bears men's basketball team
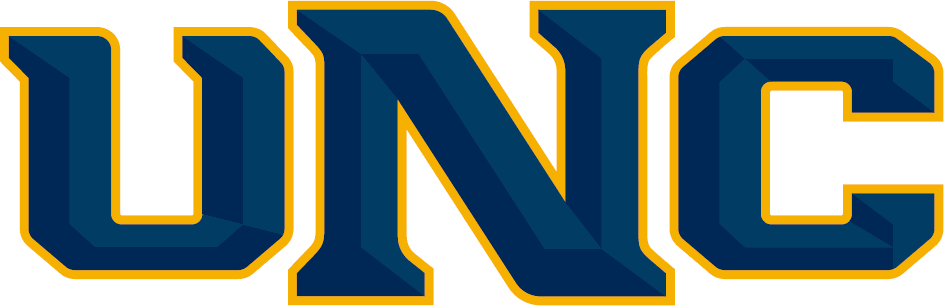
- University: University of Northern Colorado
- Head coach: Steve Smiley (7th season)
- Location: Greeley, Colorado
- Arena: Bank of Colorado Arena (capacity: 2,992)
- Conference: Big Sky
- Nickname: Bears
- Colors: Blue and gold

NCAA Division I tournament Sweet Sixteen
- Division II; 1989

NCAA Division I tournament appearances
- Division I 2011*; Division II; 1964, 1965, 1966, 1989

Conference tournament champions
- 2011*

Conference regular-season champions
- 2011*, 2025
- * - vacated by NCAA

The Northern Colorado Bears men's basketball team is the basketball team that represents University of Northern Colorado (UNC) in Greeley, Colorado, United States. The school's team currently competes in the Big Sky Conference. Northern Colorado made its first and to date only NCAA tournament appearance in 2011.

== Team History ==
Northern Colorado began men’s basketball play in 1901. The program joined the Rocky Mountain Athletic Conference in 1924 and remained in that conference into 1973. From 1973 to 1976, Northern Colorado moved and competed in the Great Plains Athletic Conference before a brief period as an independent. In 1979, the Bears joined the North Central Conference. Northern Colorado then competed as an independent during the 2003-04 through 2005–06 seasons while transitioning to NCAA Division I men's basketball. The move was finalized in 2006 with the program’s entry into Division I and membership in the Big Sky Conference.

== Coaches ==
The following is a list of Northern Colorado Bears men's basketball head coaches. There have been 20 head coaches of the Bears in their 121-season history.

Northern Colorado's current head coach is Steve Smiley. He was hired as the Bears' head coach in March 2020, replacing Jeff Linder, who left to become the head coach at Wyoming. Smiley served as associate head coach before moving to the head coaching role.

Northern Colorado has had three Big Sky Coach of the Year award winners. B.J. Hill won in 2011, Jeff Linder won in 2019, and Steve Smiley won in 2024.

Head Coaching History
Coach	Tenure	Record	Pct.
Unknown^	1901-1914	5-3	.423
Royce Long	1914-1916	3-5	.375
Paul Abbott	1916-1917	5-7	.417
Ralph Glaze	1917-1919	8-13	.381
William E. Search	1919-1922	11-13	.458
George E. Cooper	1922-1931	88-48	.647
John S. Davis	1931-1937	71-53	.573
Jules Doubenmeier	1937-1940	33-24	.579
Pete Butler	1940-1943; 1945-1956	151-133	.532
John W. Hancock	1943-1945	1-25	.038
John Bunn	1956-1963	73-94	.437
George Sage	1963-1968	95-36	.725
Thurm Wright	1968-1983	156-216	.419
Ron Brillhart	1983-1992	121-132	.478
Ken Smith	1992-1999	78-111	.413
Craig Rasmusson	1999-2006	63-129	.328
Tad Boyle	2006-2010	56-66	.459
B.J. Hill*	2010-2016	10-21	.323
Jeff Linder	2016-2020	80-50	.615
Steve Smiley	2020-present	109-82	.571

^ Northern Colorado did not field a team for the 1903–04, 1907–08, or 1909–10 seasons.
* Northern Colorado vacated all results between 2010 and 2015. Hill's on-court record is 86–98 (.467).

== Players ==
=== Career leaders ===
Career Points Leaders
Rank	Player	Career	Total
1	Jordan Davis	2015-2019	2,272
2	Mike Higgins	1985-1989	2,112
3	Chuck Knostman	1981-1985	1,664
4	Daylen Kountz	2021-2023	1,649
5	Devon Beitzel	2006-2011	1,568
6	Bodie Hume	2018-2022	1,530
7	Derek Chaney	1990-1994	1,491
8	Matt Johnson II	2018-2023	1,425
9	Brock Wisne	2022-2026	1,398
10	Tevin Svihovec	2010-2015	1,391

Career Assist Leaders
Rank	Player	Career	Total
1	Jordan Davis	2015-2019	516
2	Sean Nolen	2000-2005	427
3	Jonah Radebaugh	2015-2020	384
	Derek Chaney	1990-1994	384
5	Matt Johnson II	2018-2023	358
6	Matt Kline	2003-2007	337
7	Tevin Svihovec	2010-2015	331
8	John Olander	1988-1992	327
9	Carlos Martinez	1996-2000	313
10	Troy Graefe	1983-1985	299

Career Rebound Leaders
Rank	Player	Career	Total
1	Mike Higgins	1985-1989	959
2	Jonah Radebaugh	2015-2020	776
3	Robert Skinner	1976-1980	767
4	Jim Hruska	1956-1960	754
5	Kur Jongkuch	2018-2022	698
6	Bodie Hume	2018-2022	676
7	Toby Moser	1986-1990	669
8	Tom Kummer	1971-1975	648
9	Mike Proctor	2008-2012	639
10	Robert Ruffin	1959-1962	617

Career Steals Leaders
Rank	Player	Career	Total
1	Knute Peterson	1981-1985	160
2	Jordan Davis	2015-2019	155
3	Devon Beitzel	2006-2011	151
4	Jonah Radebaugh	2015-2020	148
5	Antwine Williams	1996-1998	134
6	Mike Higgins	1985-1989	131
	Sean Nolen	2000-2005	131
8	Derek Chaney	1990-1994	130
9	Erik Olson	2002-2006	123
10	Tedd Sabus	1984-1988	113

Career Blocks Leaders
Rank	Player	Career	Total
1	Mike Higgins	1985-1989	302
2	Ryan Adle	1996-1999	158
3	Dave Mellick	1989-1992	146
4	Bodie Hume	2018-2022	131
5	Jason Jacob	1993-1997	78
6	Connor Osborne	2009-2014	71
7	Dennis Jenkins	1984-1985	69
8	Jalen Sanders	2017-2019	67
9	Todd Lane	1990-1993	66

=== Awards and honors ===
All-Americans

Player	Year(s)	Team(s)
Devon Beitzel	2011	AP (Honorable Mention)
Jordan Davis	2019	AP (Honorable Mention)

Big Sky Player of the Year

- Devon Beitzel – 2011
- Jordan Davis – 2019

Big Sky Rookie of the Year

- Bodie Hume – 2019

Big Sky Defensive Player of the Year

- Yahosh Bonner - 2010
- Jonah Radebaugh - 2017, 2019, 2020

Big Sky Sixth Man of the Year

- Kai Edwards - 2020
- Dejour Reaves - 2024

Big Sky Tournament MVP

- Devon Beitzel - 2011

Big Sky All-Conference First Team

- Jabril Banks - 2009
- Will Figures - 2010
- Devon Beitzel - 2011
- Derrick Barden - 2013
- Andre Spight - 2018
- Jordan Davis - 2019
- Jonah Radebaugh - 2020
- Daylen Kountz - 2022
- Saint Thomas - 2024
- Langston Reynolds - 2025
- Isaiah Hawthorne - 2025
- Jaron Rillie - 2025
- Quinn Denker - 2026

Big Sky All-Conference Second Team

- Devon Beitzel - 2010
- Neal Kingman - 2011
- Tate Unrah - 2013, 2014
- Derrick Barden - 2014
- Bodie Hume - 2020
- Dalton Knecht - 2023
- Dejour Reaves - 2024
- Brock Wisne - 2026

Big Sky All-Conference Third Team

- Jordan Davis - 2017, 2018
- Bodie Hume - 2021
- Matt Johnson II - 2021, 2022

Big Sky All-Conference Defensive Team

- Zach Bloch - 2025, 2026

== Postseason history ==
=== NCAA Division I tournament results ===
The Bears have appeared in the NCAA Division I Tournament once, where they lost to San Diego State in 2011 (led by coach B. J. Hill).

Year	Seed	Round	Opponent	Result
2011	15	Round of 64	(2) San Diego State	L 50–68

=== NCAA Division II tournament results ===
The Bears have appeared in the NCAA Division II Tournament four times. Their combined record is 1–6.

Year	Round	Opponent	Result
1964	Regional semifinals Regional 3rd-place game	Southeast Missouri State; Lamar	L 79–83; L 85–116
1965	Regional semifinals Regional 3rd-place game	Minnesota State–Moorhead; Minnesota–Duluth	L 73–74; L 58–86
1966	Regional semifinals	North Dakota	L 71–84
1989	Regional semifinals Regional Finals	Alaska–Fairbanks; Wisconsin-Milwaukee	W 92–70; L 88–89 ^{OT}

=== NIT results ===
The Bears have appeared in one National Invitation Tournament (NIT). Their record is 0–1.

Year	Round	Opponent	Result
2025	First round	UC Irvine	L 72–82

=== CBI results ===
The Bears have appeared in two College Basketball Invitational (CBI). Their combined record is 2–2.

Year	Seed	Round	Opponent	Result
2022	No. 12	First round Quarterfinals; Semifinals	No. 5 Florida Atlantic; No. 13 UNC Asheville; No. 9 UNC Wilmington	W 74–71; W 87–84; L 64–80
2024	No. 8	First round	No. 9 Cleveland State	L 49-51

=== CIT results ===
The Bears have appeared in the CollegeInsider.com Postseason Tournament (CIT) three times under three different head coaches (Tad Boyle, B. J. Hill, Jeff Linder). Their combined record is 5–2. They were CIT champions in 2018.

Year	Round	Opponent	Result
2010	First round Quarterfinals	Loyola Marymount; Pacific	W 86–76; L 59–63
2014	First round	Texas A&M–Corpus Christi	L 71–82
2018	Second Round; Quarterfinals; Semifinals; Championship Game	Drake; San Diego; Sam Houston State; UIC	W 81–72; W 86–75; W 99–80; W 76–71

== Bears in the NBA ==
=== NBA players ===
Player	Years active	Teams	Highlights
Mike Higgins	1989-1991	Lakers, Nuggets, Kings	Appeared in NBA 18 games
Dalton Knecht	2024-present	Lakers	Drafted 17th overall in the 2024 NBA draft

== Bank of Colorado Arena ==
Northern Colorado plays at Bank of Colorado Arena at Butler-Hancock Athletic Center, a 2,992-seat multi-purpose arena in Greeley, Colorado on the Northern Colorado west campus. Built in 1974, the arena is also home to the Northern Colorado Bears women's basketball team. It also serves as home to the Bears volleyball, wrestling, and indoor track and field programs.

The arena was originally named for longtime UNC coaches Pete Butler and John W. Hancock. Butler-Hancock Hall opened its doors on February 4, 1975. The venue hosted the finals of the 2011 Big Sky Conference men's basketball tournament.

On November 14th, 2014, Northern Colorado announced a 15-year naming rights agreement with the Bank of Colorado to rename the arena the Bank of Colorado Arena.
