= Steve Smiley =

American basketball coach (born 1981)

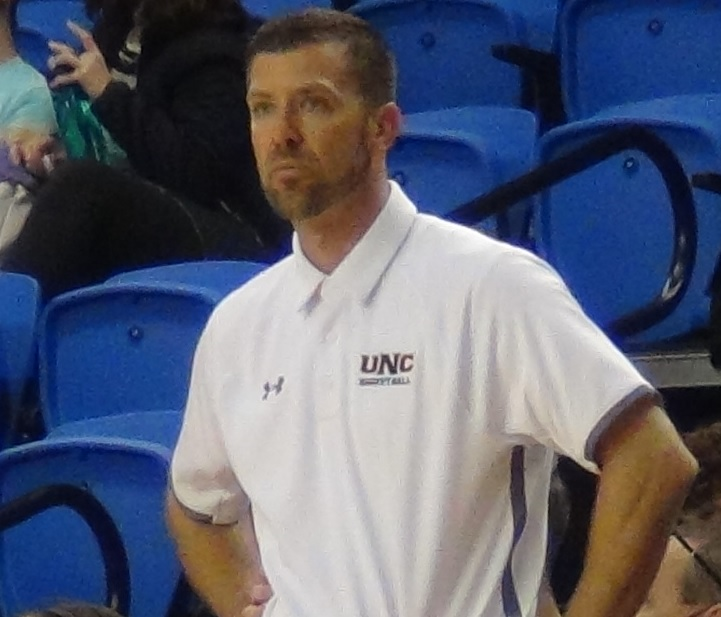
- Smiley in 2021.

Current position
- Title: Head coach
- Team: Northern Colorado
- Conference: Big Sky
- Record: 111–86 (.563)

Biographical details
- Born: April 1, 1981 (age 45); Denver, Colorado, U.S.

Playing career
- 2000–2004: Northern State

Coaching career (HC unless noted)
- 2005–2006: Black Hills State (assistant)
- 2006–2008: Northern State (assistant)
- 2008–2014: Sheridan College
- 2014–2016: Weber State (assistant)
- 2016–2020: Northern Colorado (assistant)
- 2020–present: Northern Colorado

Head coaching record
- Overall: 111–86 (.563) (NCAA); 152–45 (.772) (NJCAA)
- Tournaments: 0–1 (NIT); 2–2 (CBI)

Accomplishments and honors

Championships
- Big Sky regular season (2025)

Awards
- Big Sky Coach of the Year (2024); NSIC Co-DPOTY (2004)

Stephen Christopher Smiley (born April 1, 1981) is an American basketball coach who is the current head coach of the Northern Colorado Bears men's basketball team.

== Playing career ==
Smiley was a two-time all-state selection from Pomona High School in Arvada, Colorado. Smiley played collegiately under Don Meyer at Northern State. He completed his career with the Wolves as the school's record holder in assists with 537, while also ranking third all-time in single-season field goal percentage, along with being named a NSIC all-conference performer his senior year.

== Coaching career ==
Smiley's coaching career began in 2005 as an assistant at then-NAIA institution Black Hills State under Paul Sather for one season before returning to his alma mater as an assistant coach from 2006 to 2008. Smiley was then named the head coach at Sheridan College in Wyoming, a NJCAA school. From 2008 to 2014 he led the Generals to a 153–43 overall record with four North Sub-Region 9 titles and two runner-up finishes. They advanced to four Region 9 Final Fours along with two appearances in the championship game. Smiley would join the Division I ranks in 2014 by accepting a position on Randy Rahe's staff at Weber State and was part of the team's 2016 Big Sky championship team which made an appearance in the 2016 NCAA tournament. The following season he moved to Big Sky rival Northern Colorado as an assistant coach under Jeff Linder. In the four seasons with the Bears as an assistant, the team posted three-straight 20-win seasons, and won the 2018 CIT. On March 20, 2020, three days after Linder departed to take the head coaching position at Wyoming, Smiley was elevated to head coach, becoming the 20th coach in Northern Colorado history.

== Head coaching record ==
=== NJCAA ===
Record table
Season	Team	Overall	Conference	Standing	Postseason
Sheridan College () (2008–2014)
2008–09	Sheridan College	26–7			
2009–10	Sheridan College	27–7			
2010–11	Sheridan College	24–10			
2011–12	Sheridan College	25–7			
2012–13	Sheridan College	24–7	11–1		
2013–14	Sheridan College	26–7	15–2		
Sheridan College:		152–45 (.772)			
Total:		152–45 (.772)			

=== NCAA D1 ===
Record table
Season	Team	Overall	Conference	Standing	Postseason
Northern Colorado Bears (Big Sky Conference) (2020–present)
2020–21	Northern Colorado	11–11	6–8	7th	
2021–22	Northern Colorado	22–16	13–7	T–3rd	CBI Semifinals
2022–23	Northern Colorado	12–20	6–12	8th	
2023–24	Northern Colorado	19–14	12–6	T–2nd	CBI First Round
2024–25	Northern Colorado	25–10	15–3	T–1st	NIT First Round
2025–26	Northern Colorado	20–12	10–8	T–4th	
2026–27	Northern Colorado	2–3	0–0		
Northern Colorado:		111–86 (.563)	62–44 (.585)		
Total:		111–86 (.563)			
National champion Postseason invitational champion Conference regular season champion Conference regular season and conference tournament champion Division regular season champion Division regular season and conference tournament champion Conference tournament champion

== Books ==
Year	Title
2006	Playing for Coach Meyer
