= Kawhi Leonard =

American basketball player (born 1991)

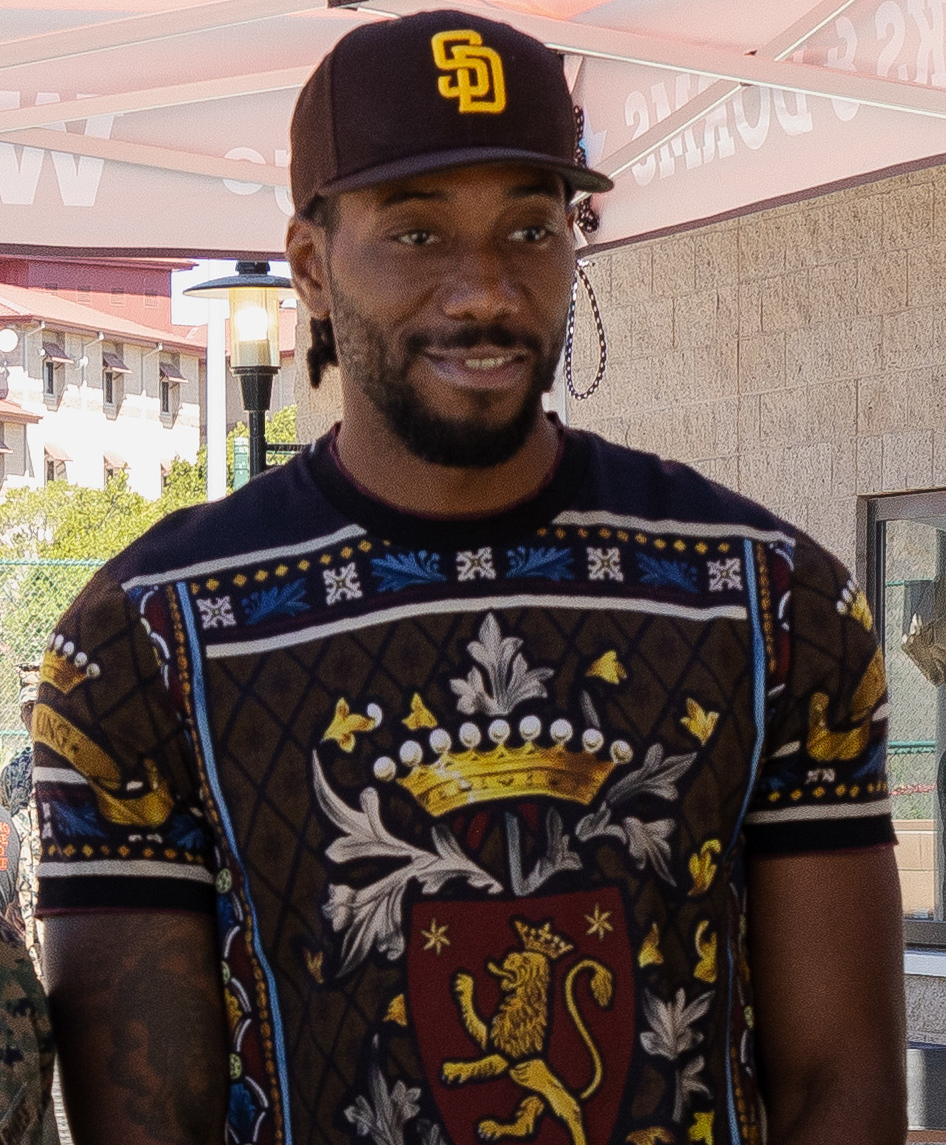
- Leonard in 2022

No. 2 – Toronto Raptors
- Position: Small forward
- League: NBA

Personal information
- Born: June 29, 1991 (age 35) Los Angeles, California, U.S.
- Listed height: 6 ft 7 in (2.01 m)
- Listed weight: 225 lb (102 kg)

Career information
- High school: Canyon Springs (Moreno Valley, California); Martin Luther King (Riverside, California)
- College: San Diego State (2009–2011)
- NBA draft: 2011: 1st round, 15th overall pick
- Drafted by: Indiana Pacers
- Playing career: 2011–present

Career history
- 2011–2018: San Antonio Spurs
- 2018–2019: Toronto Raptors
- 2019–2026: Los Angeles Clippers
- 2026–present: Toronto Raptors

Career highlights
- 2× NBA champion (2014, 2019); 2× NBA Finals MVP (2014, 2019); 7× NBA All-Star (2016, 2017, 2019–2021, 2024, 2026); NBA All-Star Game MVP (2020); 3× All-NBA First Team (2016, 2017, 2021); 4× All-NBA Second Team (2019, 2020, 2024, 2026); 2× NBA Defensive Player of the Year (2015, 2016); 3× NBA All-Defensive First Team (2015–2017); 4× NBA All-Defensive Second Team (2014, 2019–2021); NBA All-Rookie First Team (2012); NBA steals leader (2015); NBA 75th Anniversary Team; Consensus second-team All-American (2011); 2× First-team All-MWC (2010, 2011); No. 15 retired by San Diego State Aztecs; California Mr. Basketball (2009)
- Stats at NBA.com
- Stats at Basketball Reference

Kawhi Anthony Leonard (/kəˈwaɪ/ kə-WHY; born June 29, 1991) is an American professional basketball player for the Toronto Raptors of the National Basketball Association (NBA). A two-time NBA champion and two-time Finals MVP, he is a seven-time All-Star and seven-time member of the All-NBA Team (including three first-team selections). Nicknamed the "Claw" or "Klaw" for his ball-hawking skills and exceptionally large hands, Leonard is often regarded as one of the greatest two-way players in NBA history, earning seven All-Defensive Team selections and winning Defensive Player of the Year honors in 2015 and 2016. In 2021, he was named to the NBA 75th Anniversary Team.

Leonard played two seasons of college basketball for San Diego State. He was selected 15th overall by the Indiana Pacers in the 2011 NBA draft before being traded to the San Antonio Spurs on draft night.

With the Spurs, Leonard won an NBA championship in 2014 and was named the Finals Most Valuable Player. After seven seasons with the Spurs, Leonard was traded to the Toronto Raptors in 2018. In his only season with the Raptors in 2019, he led the Raptors to their first NBA championship and won his second Finals MVP award (one of only three players to win Finals MVP with multiple teams, along with Kareem Abdul-Jabbar and LeBron James). He subsequently moved to his hometown of Los Angeles and signed with the Los Angeles Clippers as a free agent in July 2019. In 2021, Leonard led the team to the conference finals for the first time in franchise history. In 2026, Leonard was traded back to the Raptors.

Leonard was awarded Associated Press Athlete of the Year in 2019.

== Early life ==
Leonard attended Canyon Springs High School in Moreno Valley, California, before transferring to Martin Luther King High School for his junior year. In his senior year there, he and Tony Snell led the King High Wolves to a 30–3 record. Leonard averaged 22.6 points, 13.1 rebounds, 3.9 assists, and 3 blocks per game that year and was named California Mr. Basketball.

Considered a four-star recruit by Rivals.com, Leonard was listed in the recruiting rankings of 2009 as the No. 8 small forward and the No. 48 player nationwide.

== College career ==
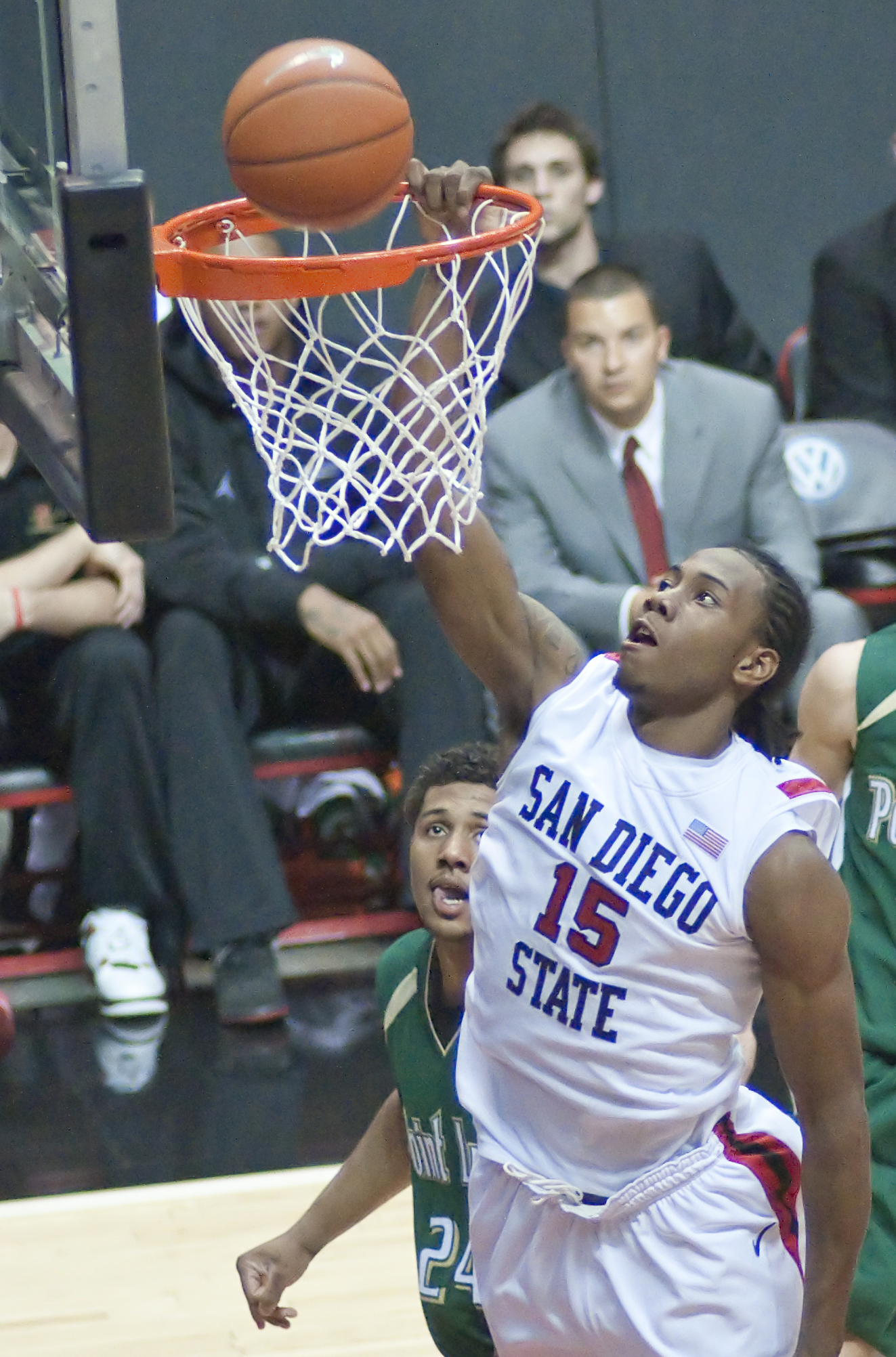
Leonard with San Diego State in 2009

As a freshman at San Diego State University in 2009–10, Leonard averaged 12.7 points and 9.9 rebounds per game for the Aztecs. He helped the team achieve a 25–9 record and led them to win the Mountain West Conference (MWC) tournament title. The Aztecs thus received an automatic bid to the NCAA tournament but would lose in the first round to Tennessee, 62–59, with Leonard recording 12 points and 10 rebounds. He led the MWC in rebounding and was named MWC Freshman of the Year, First Team All-MWC, and the 2010 MWC tournament MVP.

During his sophomore season, Leonard averaged 15.7 points and 10.4 rebounds per contest as the Aztecs finished with a 34–3 record and won back-to-back conference tournament championships. Led by Leonard, San Diego State once again made the NCAA tournament. This time the Aztecs advanced to the Sweet 16, but then they lost to eventual national champions, Connecticut. Leonard was named to the Second Team All-America and left San Diego State to enter the 2011 NBA draft.

On February 1, 2020, San Diego State retired Leonard's number 15, making him the first Aztecs men's basketball player to have his jersey raised to the rafters. It was the third number retirement in program history, after Michael Cage (44) and Milton "Milky" Phelps (22).

== Professional career ==
According to Sports Illustrated, NBA scouts were aware in 2011 that Leonard had a strong work ethic and was a "physical marvel, 6'7" with a 7'3" wingspan and 11-inch hands, too strong to screen and too long to elude". Nevertheless, they found him "difficult to pin down". Sporting News has asserted that Leonard was known more for his defense and rebounding than for his offensive capabilities when he first entered the league. He was compared to Metta World Peace and Gerald Wallace, and his outside shooting (or lack thereof) was a concern.

=== San Antonio Spurs (2011–2018) ===
==== 2011–13: Rookie year and first Finals appearance ====
Leonard was selected with the 15th overall pick in the 2011 NBA draft by the Indiana Pacers but was traded that night to the San Antonio Spurs along with the rights to Erazem Lorbek and Dāvis Bertāns in exchange for George Hill. On December 10, 2011, following the conclusion of the NBA lockout, he signed a multi-year deal with the Spurs. Leonard chose to wear the jersey number 2, which was the number he wore as a child, as his No. 15 jersey was already worn by Spurs player Matt Bonner. Leonard has continued to wear this jersey number throughout his professional career.

"I think he's going to be a star. And as time goes on, he'll be the face of the Spurs, I think. At both ends of the court, he is really a special player. And what makes me be so confident about him is that he wants it so badly. He wants to be a good player, I mean a great player. He comes early, he stays late, and he's coachable. He's just like a sponge. When you consider he's only had [two years] of college and no training camp yet, you can see that he's going to be something else."

— Gregg Popovich, in 2012, on Leonard

Leonard and teammate Tiago Splitter were selected to play in the 2012 Rising Stars Challenge as members of Team Chuck. Although he suited up for the event, he did not play due to a calf strain. After starter Richard Jefferson was traded to the Golden State Warriors for Stephen Jackson, Leonard was promoted to the starting small forward position while Jackson served as his backup.

At season's end, Leonard placed fourth in Rookie of the Year voting and was named to the 2012 NBA All-Rookie First Team.

In the summer of 2012, Leonard was among several NBA up-and-comers chosen to play for the 2012 USA men's basketball Select Team. They trained with the Olympic team, which included Kobe Bryant, LeBron James, Kevin Durant, and Chris Paul.

On October 26, 2012, the Spurs exercised the team option on Leonard, re-signing him through the 2013–14 season.

Leonard was selected to play for the BBVA Rising Stars Challenge where he was once again drafted to Team Chuck. He recorded 20 points and 7 rebounds as Team Chuck defeated Team Shaq for the second straight year 163–135.

The San Antonio Spurs advanced to the NBA Finals where they faced the Miami Heat. Leonard averaged 14.6 points and 11.1 rebounds during the Finals as the Spurs lost the series in seven games.

==== 2013–14: NBA championship and Finals MVP ====
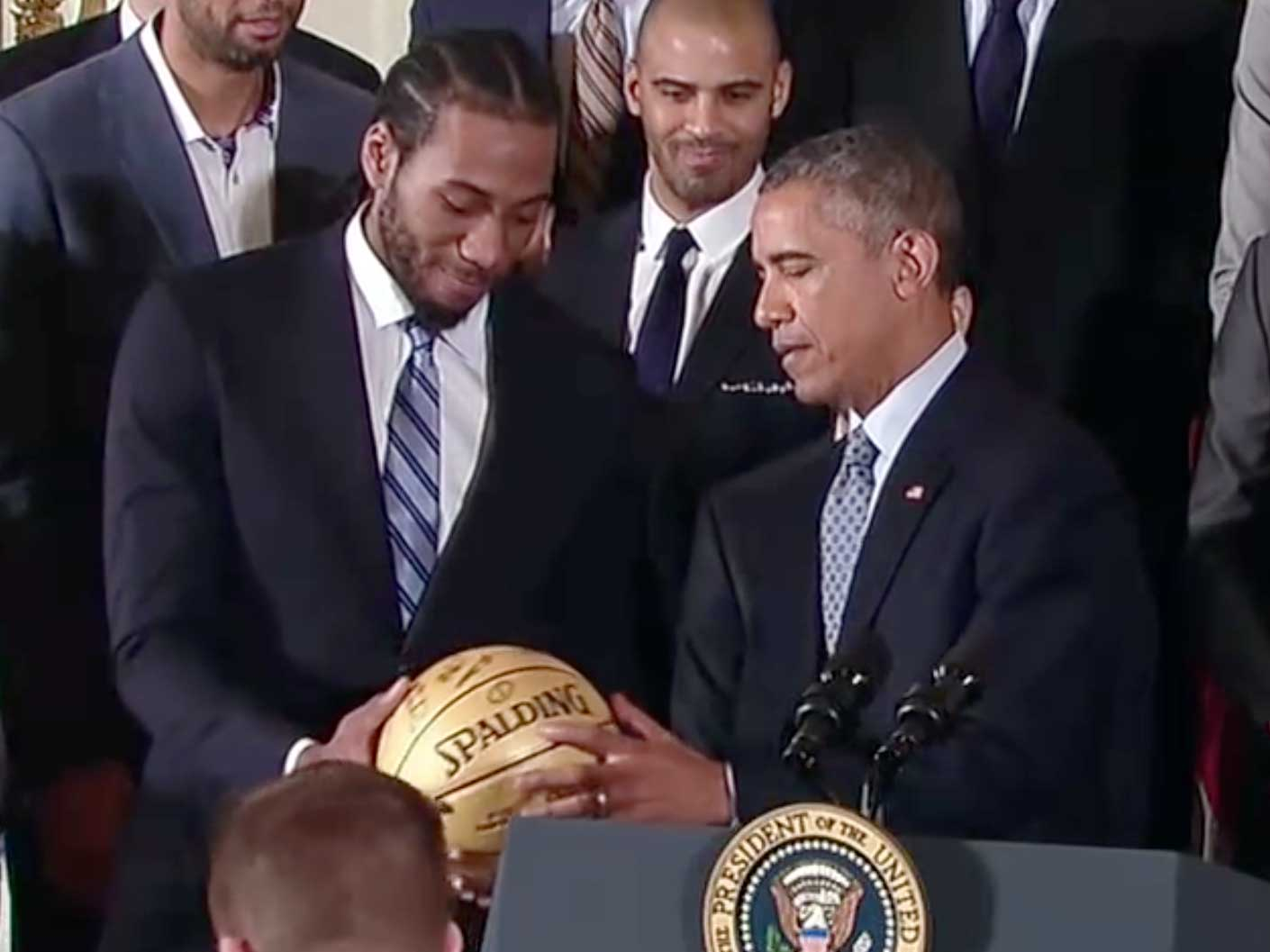
Leonard handing a signed ball to President Barack Obama at a White House ceremony honoring the Spurs team that won the 2014 NBA championship

On April 6, 2014, Leonard scored a season-high 26 points in the Spurs' 112–92 win over the Memphis Grizzlies. He finished the season averaging 12.8 points, 6.2 rebounds, 2.0 assists, 1.7 steals while shooting 52.2% from the field. Leonard helped the Spurs to a 62–20 record – the number one seed in the NBA – and was named to the NBA All-Defensive Second Team for the first time.

The Spurs and the Miami Heat met once again in the NBA Finals. On June 10, 2014, in game 3 of the series, Leonard scored a then career-high 29 points in a 111–92 victory. San Antonio went on to win the series 4–1. Leonard averaged 17.8 points on 61% shooting and was named NBA Finals MVP. He was the third-youngest winner of the award (22 years and 351 days), behind only Magic Johnson—who won in both 1980 (20 years and 278 days) and 1982 (22 years and 298 days). Leonard was also only the sixth player, and the first since Chauncey Billups in 2004, to win Finals MVP in a season in which they were not an All-Star.

==== 2014–15: Defensive Player of the Year ====
After missing the final six preseason games and the season opener against the Dallas Mavericks due to an infection in his right eye caused by conjunctivitis, Leonard made his season debut against the Phoenix Suns on October 31 despite still suffering from blurry vision. He continued to play through the blurred vision and on November 10, 2014, he scored a season-high 26 points in the Spurs' 89–85 win over the Los Angeles Clippers. Following a three-game stint on the sidelines between December 17 and 20, Leonard had an injection in his injured right hand on December 22 and was ruled out indefinitely. He returned to action on January 16, 2015, after missing 15 games, recording 20 points, 4 rebounds, 5 assists and 3 steals to lead the Spurs to a 110–96 win over the Portland Trail Blazers.

On April 5, Leonard recorded 26 points and a career-high 7 steals in a 107–92 win over the Golden State Warriors. On April 23, Leonard was named the NBA Defensive Player of the Year, joining Michael Jordan and Hakeem Olajuwon as the only players to win both NBA Defensive Player of the Year and NBA Finals MVP. The next day, he scored a playoff career-high 32 points in a game 3 first-round victory over the Los Angeles Clippers. The Spurs went on to lose the series in seven games.

==== 2015–16: First All-Star, MVP runner-up and second DPOY award ====
On July 16, 2015, Leonard re-signed with the Spurs to a five-year, $90 million contract. On October 28, he tied his career-high 32 points in a 112–106 season-opening loss to the Oklahoma City Thunder. On December 3, he scored 27 points and made a career-high seven three-pointers in a 103–83 win over the Memphis Grizzlies. On January 21, 2016, he was named as a starter to the Western Conference team for the 2016 All-Star Game, earning his first All-Star selection and became the sixth Spurs player in franchise history to be selected as an All-Star starter, joining George Gervin, Larry Kenon, Alvin Robertson, David Robinson and Tim Duncan.

On March 23, 2016, Leonard had another 32-point outing in a 112–88 win over the Miami Heat, helping the Spurs extend their franchise-record home winning streak to 45 games (dating to 2014–15 season). On April 2, he set a new career-high with 33 points in a 102–95 win over the Toronto Raptors, helping the Spurs set a franchise record with their 64th victory. The Spurs topped their 63-win season in 2005–06 and extended their NBA-record home winning streak to start the season to 39 games. Leonard helped the Spurs finish second in the Western Conference with a 67–15 record, and earned Defensive Player of the Year honors for a second straight year, becoming the first non-center to win the honor in back-to-back seasons since Dennis Rodman in 1989–90 and 1990–91. Additionally, he finished runner-up in the MVP voting behind Stephen Curry.

In game 3 of the first-round playoffs against the Memphis Grizzlies, Leonard helped the Spurs go up 3–0 in the series with a 32-point effort, tying his playoff career-high. After sweeping the Grizzlies, the Spurs moved on to face the Oklahoma City Thunder in the second round. In game 3 of the series against the Thunder, Leonard helped his team go up 2–1 with 31 points and 11 rebounds. However, the Spurs went on to lose the next three games, bowing out of the playoffs with a 4–2 defeat.

==== 2016–17: Second All-NBA First Team selection ====
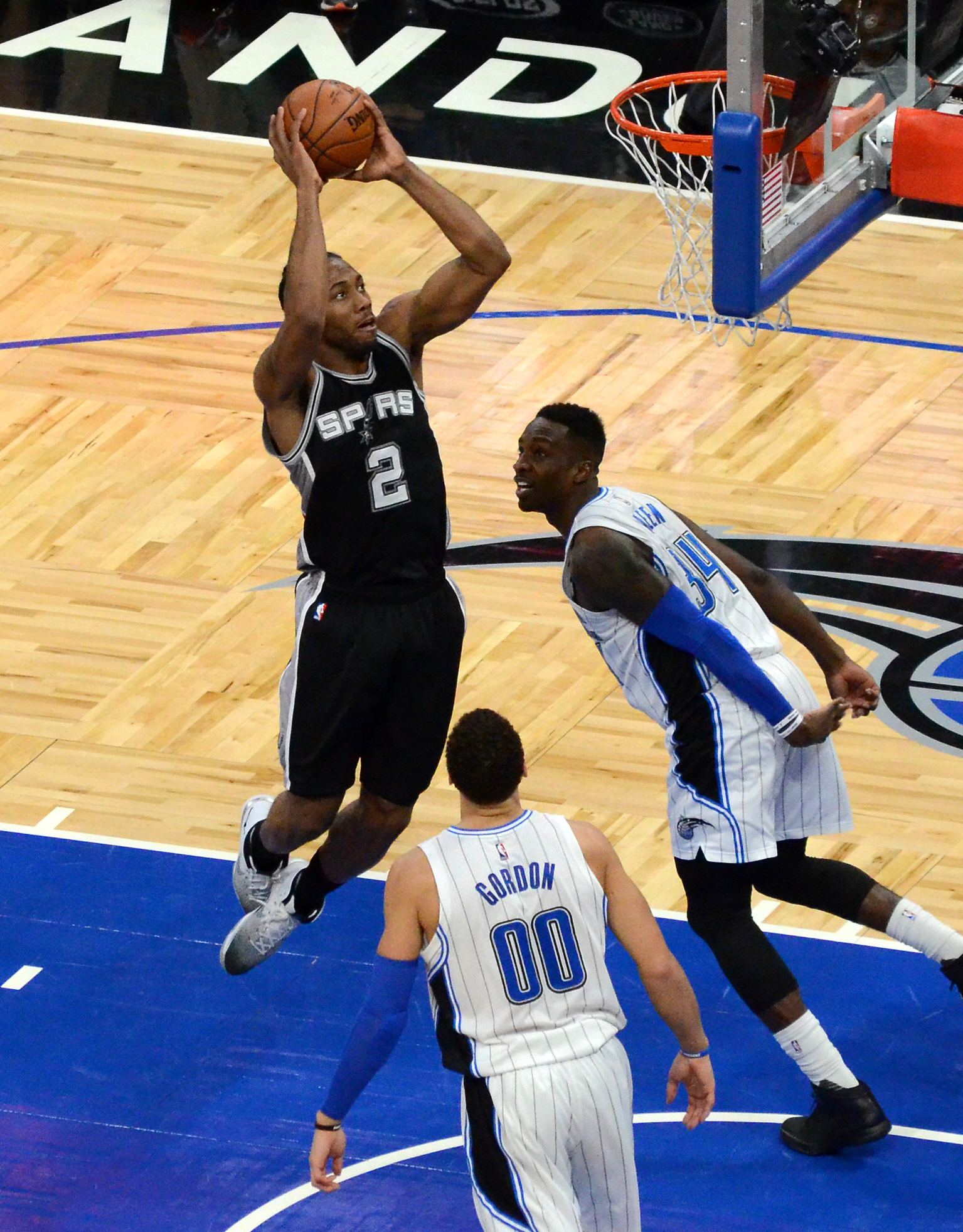
Leonard with the Spurs in 2017

In the Spurs' season opener on October 25, 2016, Leonard recorded a career-high 35 points and five steals in a 129–100 win over the Golden State Warriors. On January 14, 2017, he set a new career high with 38 points in a 108–105 loss to the Phoenix Suns, becoming the first Spur to record three consecutive 30-point games since Tony Parker in 2012. On January 19, he was named a starter for the Western Conference All-Star team in the 2017 NBA All-Star Game and had 34 points against the Denver Nuggets for his fifth straight 30-point performance. Two days later, he set a new career high with 41 points in a 118–115 overtime win over the Cleveland Cavaliers, becoming the first San Antonio player to score at least 30 in six straight games since Mike Mitchell in 1986. He subsequently earned Western Conference Player of the Week honors for games played from January 16 through 22.

On February 13, 2017, Leonard made 13 of 23 shots including two three-pointers and finished with 32 points, six rebounds and four steals in a 110–106 win over the Indiana Pacers. It was his fifth straight 30-point game. With their 42nd victory of the season coming against the Pacers, the Spurs extended their streak of consecutive winning seasons to a league-record 20. On March 6, after being named Player of the Week for the fourth time in his career, Leonard scored 39 points to lead the Spurs to a 112–110 win over the Houston Rockets. It was his 91st straight game scoring in double figures, matching San Antonio's longest streak since Tim Duncan did so in 2002–03.

On April 15, 2017, Leonard matched his postseason high with 32 points in a 111–82 victory over the Memphis Grizzlies in game 1 of their first-round playoff series. Two days later, in game 2, Leonard had a postseason career-high 37 points and added 11 rebounds in a 96–82 win over Memphis to take a 2–0 series lead. In game 4 of the series in Memphis, Leonard had another postseason personal best with 43 points in a 110–108 overtime loss; the loss tied the series at 2–2. Behind a 29-point effort from Leonard in game 6, the Spurs advanced to the Western Conference semifinals by beating Memphis 103–96 to take the series 4–2. The Spurs went on to advance to the Western Conference finals with a 4–2 triumph over the Houston Rockets in the second round, despite playing without Leonard in game 6 due to an ankle injury.

In the third quarter of game 1 of the Western Conference finals against the Golden State Warriors, Leonard landed on Zaza Pachulia's foot after attempting a field goal and re-aggravated his existing ankle injury. He exited the game with 26 points and sat out the remainder of the series as the Spurs lost to the Warriors in four games. Leonard finished the season with averages of 25.5 points, 5.8 rebounds, 3.5 assists and 1.8 steals per game in the regular season, and 27.7 points, 7.8 rebounds, 4.6 assists and 1.7 steals for the playoffs. He was subsequently selected to the All-NBA First Team for the second straight year, as well as earning All-Defensive First Team honors for the third consecutive season.

==== 2017–18: Injury-plagued season ====
Leonard missed the first 27 games of the season with a right quadriceps injury, making his season debut on December 12, 2017, against the Dallas Mavericks. He appeared in nine games between December 12 and January 13. He returned from a three-game absence on January 13 against the Denver Nuggets after straining his left shoulder against the Phoenix Suns on January 5. On January 17, he was ruled out for an indefinite period of time to continue his rehabilitation process from right quadriceps tendinopathy. Leonard was subsequently cleared to play by the Spurs medical staff, but he solicited a second opinion from his own doctors. In March, the Spurs held a players-only meeting in which Leonard's teammates reportedly entreated him to return to the court; the meeting was described as "tense and emotional". Leonard did not play again in 2018.

=== Toronto Raptors (2018–2019) ===
==== 2018–19: Second NBA championship and Finals MVP ====
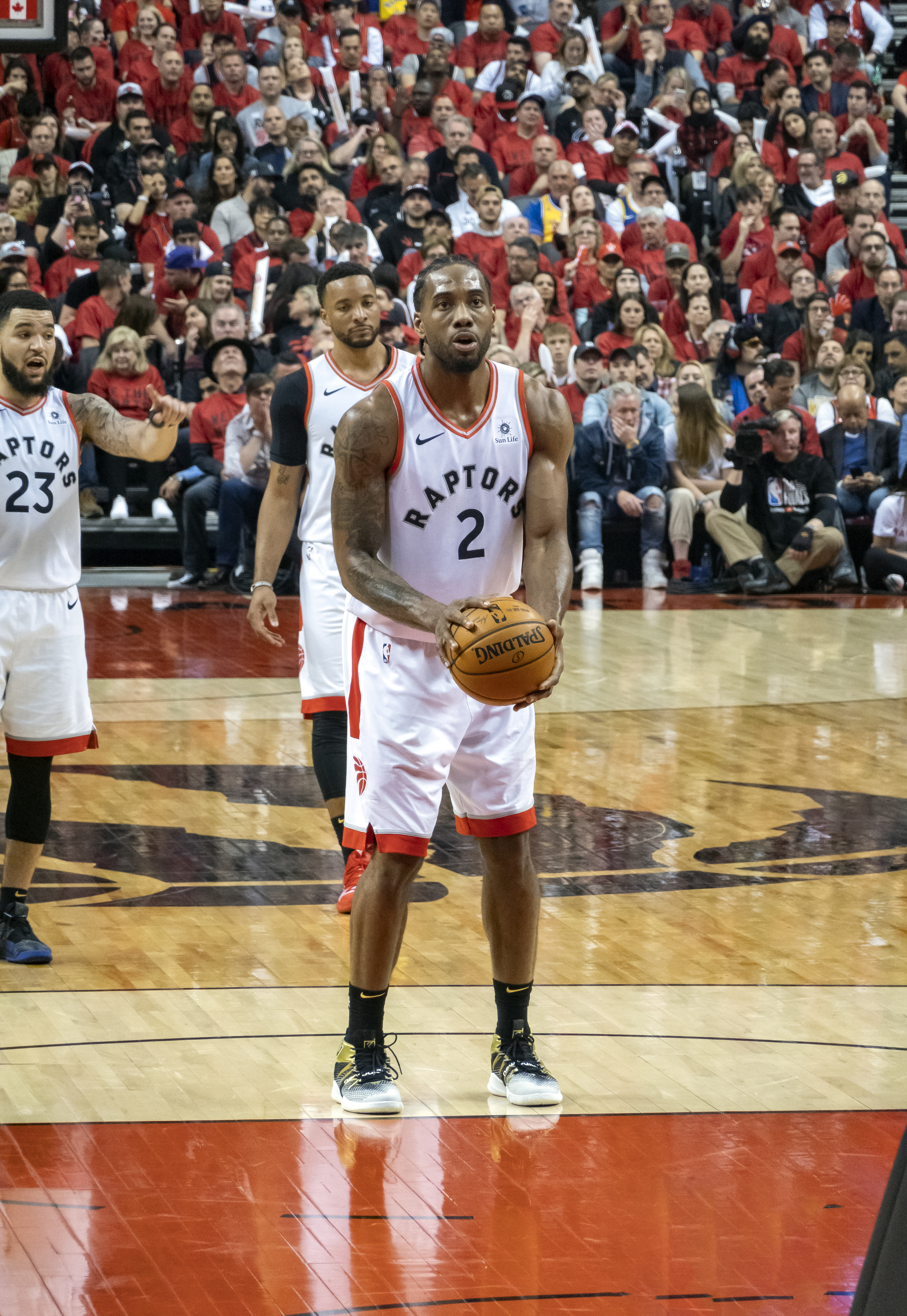
Leonard attempting a free throw during game 2 of the 2019 NBA Finals

In June 2018, reports surfaced claiming that Leonard had requested a trade from the Spurs and that he did so after months of tension between his camp and the Spurs stemming from a disagreement over his injury rehabilitation program, requesting to be traded to the Los Angeles Lakers. His request to go to the Lakers was not fulfilled, as a month later, on July 18, Leonard and teammate Danny Green were traded to the Toronto Raptors instead, in exchange for DeMar DeRozan, Jakob Pöltl and a protected 2019 first-round draft pick. It was a risky move for the Raptors and their president, Masai Ujiri, given the concerns over Leonard's health and the possibility of him leaving as a free agent at the end of the season. In his debut for the Raptors in their season opener on October 17, Leonard had 24 points and 12 rebounds in a 116–104 win over the Cleveland Cavaliers. Two days later, he had 31 points and 10 rebounds in a 113–101 win over the Boston Celtics.

Leonard was named Eastern Conference Player of the Week for games played November 26 – December 2. On January 1, 2019, he scored a then career-high 45 points in a 122–116 win over the Utah Jazz. On January 31, against the Milwaukee Bucks, Leonard's career-high streak of scoring at least 20 points in 22 consecutive games ended when he had 16 points in a 105–92 loss.

In game 1 of the Eastern Conference semifinals against the Philadelphia 76ers, Leonard had a playoff career-high 45 points, on 16-of-23 (69.6%) shooting, to lead the Raptors in a 108–95 victory. He became just the second player in Raptors history to eclipse 40 points in a playoff game, joining Vince Carter (50 points, 2001). In the deciding game 7, Leonard hit a shot from the corner at the buzzer that bounced off the rim four times before falling to give the Raptors a 92–90 victory over the 76ers to advance to the Eastern Conference finals. He finished the game with 41 points on 16-of-39 shooting. This was the first game 7 buzzer beater in NBA history and caused the normally stoic Leonard to let out a victorious scream as he was swarmed by his teammates. Leonard said of the shot afterward: "It was great. That's something I've never experienced before, Game 7, game-winning shot. It was a blessing to be able to get to that point and make that shot and feel that moment. It's something I can look back on in my career."

The Raptors continued their 2019 NBA playoffs march against the top-seeded Milwaukee Bucks. In game 3 of the Eastern Conference finals, Leonard scored 36 points, including eight in the second overtime, to help the Raptors beat Milwaukee 118–112 to cut the Bucks' series lead to 2–1. In game 5, he helped the Raptors take a 3–2 lead with 35 points on five 3-pointers to go with seven rebounds and nine assists in a 105–99 win. In game 6, he had 27 points and 17 rebounds to lead the Raptors into the NBA Finals for the first time with a 100–94 victory. Leonard put an exclamation point on the conference victory with a huge dunk on 2019 NBA MVP Giannis Antetokounmpo that was set up by a Kyle Lowry steal.

Leonard led the Raptors into the 2019 Finals on the back of what was being described as an all-time great NBA playoff performance. In game 2, Leonard had 34 points and 14 rebounds in a 109–104 loss to the Golden State Warriors. Leonard helped the Raptors take a 3–1 series lead with 36 points and 12 rebounds in a 105–92 game 4 win on the road in Oakland. In game 6, he scored 22 points in a 114–110 win to help lift the Raptors to a 4–2 series victory in claiming his second NBA championship. He was subsequently named NBA Finals MVP for the second time, becoming just the third Finals MVP to have won the award with two teams, joining LeBron James and Kareem Abdul-Jabbar. He is also the first person to win Finals MVP with a team from each conference. Leonard scored 732 points during the 2019 playoffs; this was the third-best scoring total for a single NBA postseason in league history, behind only LeBron James (748, 2018) and Michael Jordan (759, 1992).

=== Los Angeles Clippers (2019–2026) ===
==== 2019–20: All-Star Game MVP ====
On July 10, 2019, Leonard signed with his hometown team, the Los Angeles Clippers, to a reported three-year, $103 million contract, which included an opt-out clause in 2021 who also acquired Paul George that offseason from the Thunder for Shai Gilgeous-Alexander, Danilo Gallinari, five first-round draft picks, and the rights to swap two other first-round picks in a trade. Leonard debuted for the Clippers on October 22, 2019, where he put up 30 points, 6 rebounds, and 5 assists in a 112–102 win over the Los Angeles Lakers. On October 24, he recorded 21 points and tied a career-high 9 assists in a 141–122 win over the Golden State Warriors. On December 11, Leonard returned to Toronto for the first since joining the Clippers and was met with a tribute and a standing ovation from the crowd before scoring 23 points and recording six assists in 112–92 win over the Raptors. Two days later, Leonard scored a then season-high 42 points along with 11 rebounds in a 124–117 win over the Minnesota Timberwolves. It was the first time in franchise history that two players eclipsed 40 points, as teammate Paul George scored 46 points. On Christmas Day, the Clippers and Lakers met once again in a much anticipated matchup, in which Leonard put up 35 points on 11-of-19 shooting and 12 rebounds to lead the Clippers to a 111–106 comeback win despite trailing by as much as 15. On January 14, 2020, Leonard scored a season-high 43 points in just 29 minutes in a 128–103 win over the Cleveland Cavaliers. He was named Western Conference Player of the Week for games played from January 13 through 19. On January 24, Leonard recorded his first career triple-double with 33 points, 10 rebounds, and 10 assists (a new career-high) in a 122–117 win over the Miami Heat. On February 16, Leonard was named the NBA All-Star Game MVP of the 2020 NBA All-Star Game, becoming the first recipient of the award after its renaming in Kobe Bryant's honor.

After the 2019–20 NBA season was suspended on March 11 due to the COVID-19 pandemic, Leonard and the Clippers returned to action in the NBA Bubble at Walt Disney World in Bay Lake, Florida, near Orlando on July 30. Leonard played six out of the team's eight seeding games and was eventually selected to the NBA's All-Bubble Second Team, averaging 28.8 points, 4.8 rebounds and 4.3 assists. In the first round of the 2020 NBA playoffs, the Clippers eliminated the Dallas Mavericks in six games while Leonard recorded over 30 points in five consecutive games and averaged 32.8 points, 10.2 rebounds, and 5.2 assists for the series. The Clippers were eliminated by the Denver Nuggets in the Western Conference semifinals, losing in seven games after surrendering a 3–1 series lead. In game 7, Leonard performed poorly, scoring only 14 points while shooting 6-of-22 from the field. Leonard was named to the All-NBA Second Team for the second time, and to his fourth All-NBA Team overall.

==== 2020–21: Season ended with injury ====
In the Clippers' season opener on December 22, 2020, Leonard recorded 26 points and two steals in a 116–109 win over the Los Angeles Lakers. On December 25, in the fourth quarter of a game against the Denver Nuggets, Leonard received an elbow to the face from teammate Serge Ibaka, causing a facial injury which forced Leonard out of the game early. Leonard suffered a wound in his mouth as a result of his injury, which required him to get eight stitches. After being absent for two games due to the injury, Leonard returned to the Clippers wearing a clear plastic mask with a 128–105 win over the Portland Trail Blazers on December 30, recording a game-high 28 points and seven assists.

Playing in 52 out of the 72 regular season games, Leonard led the Clippers to a 47–25 record and the fourth-place finish in the Western Conference. For the season he averaged 24.8 points, 6.5 rebounds and a career-high 5.2 assists. After his stellar play on both ends of the floor, he was awarded with his seventh All-Defensive Team selection and fifth All-NBA Team selection third All-NBA First Team. In the first round of the 2021 NBA playoffs the Clippers faced the Dallas Mavericks for the rematch of the previous year. After losing the first two games at home, the Clippers bounced back with Leonard scoring 36 and 29 points respectively in games played in Dallas to even the series. After dropping game 5, Leonard led the Clippers in the elimination game 6, tying his career-high 45 points and subsequently recorded 28 points, 10 rebounds, nine assists and four steals in the decisive game 7 win, to advance to the next round.

In the Western Conference semifinals the Clippers were again facing a 0–2 deficit at the beginning of the series, this time to the first-seeded Utah Jazz. Leonard led another comeback while scoring 34 and 31 points respectively in convincing victories at home to even the series. He, however, got injured at the end of game 4 after being fouled by Joe Ingles. Leonard was ruled out for the remainder of the series with a knee sprain, as the Clippers won the next two games and advanced to the first Western Conference finals in franchise history. The Clippers' playoffs run was then cut short by the Phoenix Suns in six games, with Leonard unable to recover and missing the entire series. On July 13, Leonard underwent surgery to repair a partial tear of the ACL in his right knee.

==== 2021–22: Year absence ====
After opting out of the final year of his original contract, Leonard re-signed with the Clippers on August 12, 2021, to a max four-year, $176.3 million contract with the fourth year being a player option. Leonard remained inactive the entire season after recovering from the partial ACL tear in his right knee. Without Leonard, the Clippers finished the season 42–40 and qualified for the play-in tournament, but failed to qualify for the playoffs after being defeated by both the Minnesota Timberwolves and the New Orleans Pelicans.

==== 2022–23: Return from injury and playoffs setback ====
Leonard made his return from injury on October 3, 2022, putting up 11 points, four rebounds, two assists, and two steals in a 102–97 preseason win over the Trail Blazers. On October 20, Leonard made his regular season return, logging 14 points, seven rebounds, and two assists off the bench in a 103–97 win over the Los Angeles Lakers. On December 5, Leonard put up a game-winner in a 119–117 win over the Charlotte Hornets. On December 12, Leonard recorded 25 points on 10-of-12 shooting, nine rebounds and six assists, as the Clippers beat the Boston Celtics 113–93. On January 10, 2023, Leonard scored 33 points on 9-of-12 shooting, 3-of-5 from three and 12-of-12 from the free throw line, along with nine rebounds, four assists and four steals in a 113–101 win over the Dallas Mavericks. On January 20, Leonard scored a then season-high 36 points on 13-of-18 shooting, 4-of-5 from three and 6-of-6 from the free throw line and delivered seven assists in a 131–126 win over his former team, the San Antonio Spurs.

On February 14, Leonard scored 33 points, tying his career high with seven three-pointers in a 134–124 win over the reigning champions Golden State Warriors. He was 12-of-17 from the floor, 7-of-9 from the three-point range and made both of his free throws in 34 minutes. On February 24, Leonard scored a season-high 44 points on 16-of-22 shooting, 6-of-9 from three, 6-of-6 from the free throw line in a 176–175 double overtime loss against the Sacramento Kings. It was the second-highest scoring game in NBA history. On April 9, in the final game of the 2022–23 season, Leonard recorded 25 points, a season-high 15 rebounds and six assists to lead the Clippers to a 119–114 win over the Phoenix Suns, earning the fifth seed in the Western Conference playoff bracket and a first-round rematch against the Suns. On April 10, Leonard earned his eighth career NBA Player of the Week Award and his second with the Clippers. In the final week of the regular season, Leonard led the Clippers to a 3–0 record, behind averages of 25.7 points, 10.0 rebounds and 4.7 assists.

In game 1 of the Clippers' first-round playoff series against the Phoenix Suns, Leonard posted a game-high 38 points, five rebounds and five assists in a 115–110 win. He missed the last three games of the Clippers first-round playoff series because of a torn meniscus in his right knee. Without him and Paul George, the Clippers were eliminated from the playoffs by the Suns in five games. In the first two games Leonard played against the Suns he averaged 34.5 points, 6.5 rebounds, 6 assists and 2 steals per game.

==== 2023–24: Postseason injury ====
On December 8, 2023, Leonard scored a season-high 41 points, along with five rebounds and five assists in a 117–113 win over the Utah Jazz. He made a season-high 14 field goals in 23 attempts, was six-of-eight from three-point range and made all seven of his free throws. On December 16, Leonard scored 36 points on 12-of-16 shooting, five-of-six from three, seven-of-seven from the free throw line in a 144–122 win over the New York Knicks.

On January 10, 2024, Leonard signed an extension with the Clippers that would pay him $153 million over the next three years. On January 23, he recorded just his second career triple-double, posting 25 points, 11 rebounds, and 10 assists in a 127–116 win against the Los Angeles Lakers. In the playoffs, Leonard played just two games because of a right knee injury, and without his help, the Clippers would go on to lose the first round series against the eventual Western Conference champion Dallas Mavericks in six games.

==== 2024–25: Further injuries ====
On October 17, 2024, less than a week before the Clippers' season opener against the Phoenix Suns, it was announced that Leonard would be ruled out indefinitely to begin the new season due to inflammation in his right knee sustained at the end of the previous regular season. According to Clippers head coach Tyronn Lue, Leonard suffered a "setback" in July while participating in United States national team camp in Las Vegas prior to his withdrawal from the 2024 Summer Olympics.

After missing the first 34 games, Leonard made his season debut on January 4, 2025, scoring 12 points in a 131–105 win over the Atlanta Hawks. However, after appearing in just two games, it was announced that Leonard would step away from the team to be with family who were forced to evacuate in the midst of the Southern California wildfires. On March 2, Leonard recorded season-highs with 33 points and 10 rebounds in a 108–102 loss against the Los Angeles Lakers. On April 13, Leonard tied his season-high with 33 points, along with six rebounds, seven assists and three steals in a 124–119 overtime win over the Golden State Warriors in the regular season finale to clinch the fifth seed in the Western Conference. In Game 2 of the Clippers first round series against the Denver Nuggets, Leonard scored a season-high 39 points on 15-of-19 shooting in a 105–102 victory. The Clippers eventually lost the series to the Nuggets in seven games.

==== 2025–26: Career high in scoring ====
On October 31, 2025, Leonard recorded 34 points, five rebounds, five assists, and six steals as the Clippers defeated the New Orleans Pelicans 126–124, with Leonard hitting a game-winning 22-foot jumper with 0.4 seconds remaining. It marked his 10th career game-winning shot, including the playoffs, and his third career buzzer-beater. On November 28, Leonard scored 39 points on a 15-of-24 shooting performance from the field in just 29 minutes of play during a 112–107 loss to the Memphis Grizzlies. On December 23, Leonard scored a then season-high 41 points on 16-of-23 shooting, including 4-of-5 from three-point range, while adding eight rebounds and five assists in a 128–108 win over the Houston Rockets. On December 28, Leonard scored a career-high 55 points, along with 11 rebounds, five steals, and three blocks, in a 112–99 win over the Detroit Pistons. He shot 17-of-26 from the field and scored 26 points in the third quarter alone. Leonard also tied the franchise record for points in a single game, previously set by teammate James Harden approximately one month earlier. In the process, he became the first player in NBA history to record at least 55 points, 10 rebounds, five steals, and three blocks in a single game.

On January 1, 2026, Leonard scored 45 points, including 20 points in the fourth quarter, to lead the Clippers to a 118–101 win over the Utah Jazz. With this performance, he became the second player in NBA history to record a five-game span averaging at least 40 points per game while shooting 50/40/90 (field goal percentage/three-point percentage/free throw percentage) and maintaining an undefeated record. The only other player to achieve this feat was Kobe Bryant from March 16–25, 2007. On February 11, Leonard recorded 27 points, 12 rebounds, four assists and four steals in a 105–102 win over the Houston Rockets. He scored 19 of his points in the fourth quarter, including a go-ahead three-point play with two seconds remaining, helping the Clippers rally from a 15-point deficit.

On March 11, Leonard scored 45 points on 15-of-20 shooting (6-of-9 from three and 9-of-10 from the free-throw line), adding five rebounds, five assists and two steals to lead the Clippers to a 153–128 win over the Minnesota Timberwolves. He also became the first player in franchise history to record at least 45 points, five rebounds, five assists and five three-pointers while shooting 75% or better from the field in a game. On March 13, Leonard scored 28 points as the Clippers defeated the Chicago Bulls 119–108, reaching 20 points for the 44th consecutive game and matching Bob McAdoo's franchise single-season record for such a streak. The following day, Leonard scored 31 points in a 118–109 loss to the Sacramento Kings, extending his streak of 20-point games to 45 and setting a new franchise record. On March 27, Leonard scored 28 points as the Clippers came back from a 24-point deficit to defeat the Indiana Pacers 114–113, capped by a game-winning jumper with 0.4 seconds remaining. With this performance, he became the 14th player in NBA history to score at least 20 points in 50 consecutive games.

Leonard guided the Clippers to a 42–40 finish (ninth seed in the Western Conference), but the Clippers would lose in the play-in tournament, missing the playoffs. Following a 6–21 start, the team posted a 36–19 record over the remainder of the season, becoming the first team in NBA history to recover from 15 games below .500 and end with a winning record. He also finished the season with a career-high 27.9 points per game, along with 6.4 rebounds per game, 3.6 assists per game, and 1.9 steals per game. Leonard was named to the All-NBA Second Team for the fourth time, and to his seventh All-NBA Team overall.

=== Return to Toronto (2026–present) ===
In June 2026, reports emerged that Leonard could be made available via trade by the Clippers. According to NBA insider Jake Fischer, Leonard was open to signing a contract extension if traded, but only with two former teams – the Toronto Raptors or San Antonio Spurs. The Raptors confirmed their interest in re-acquiring Leonard, with general manager Bobby Webster stating the team would be "opportunistic" in the trade market that summer. The Clippers, however, maintained they still had avenues to build a contending roster around Leonard and had not made him available.

On June 30, ESPN reported that the Raptors and Clippers have agreed to a potential trade involving Leonard. The Raptors organization indicated on July 9, that it planned to wait for the conclusion of the salary cap investigation involving Leonard and the Clippers before proceeding. On September 2, the NBA concluded its investigation, and levied multiple penalties, including a $700,000 fine for Leonard. On September 14, Leonard was traded back to the Raptors in exchange for Brandon Ingram, Gradey Dick and five draft picks.

On October 27, 2026, it was announced that Leonard would miss at least a week due to swelling in his left knee.

== National team career ==
In 2015, Leonard played in he United States team's showcase game, scoring 14 points for the USA White team. Leonard was a finalist for both the 2016 and 2020 United States men's Olympic basketball team rosters.

Leonard was originally chosen to be a member of the 2024 United States men's Olympic basketball team as part of the 2024 Summer Olympics in Paris. However, despite participating in a few practices with the team, on July 10, 2024, just before the team's first friendly scrimmage with Canada, he withdrew from the Olympic roster after consultations with the Clippers and USA Basketball officials. He was replaced by Derrick White of the Boston Celtics.

== Player profile ==
Standing 6 feet 7 inches (2.01 m) tall and weighing 230 pounds (104 kg), Leonard primarily plays as a small forward.

Leonard is regarded as one of the best perimeter defenders in the NBA, thanks to his combination of athleticism, size and intelligence. Highly versatile, he is capable of guarding at least three positions, and has frequently been deployed against the opposing team's star player. In 2021, to commemorate the NBA's 75th anniversary, The Athletic ranked their top 75 players of all time, and named Leonard as the 34th greatest player in NBA history.

Known early in his career primarily as an elite defender and floor spacer, Leonard began taking on a larger offensive responsibility from the 2015–16 season on and quickly established himself as one of the most efficient scorers in the league. He has developed a versatile offensive game, capable of hitting shots reliably from midrange and 3-point range, posting up his opponents and shooting pull-up jumpers and fadeaways. Playmaking has been cited as a weakness of Leonard's—in his first eight seasons, he had never averaged more than 3.5 assists per game. Leonard improved his passing game in the 2019–20 season, logging a career-high 4.9 assists per game, nearly doubling his career average.

== Career statistics ==
Legend
GP	Games played	GS	Games started	MPG	Minutes per game
FG%	Field goal percentage	3P%	3-point field goal percentage	FT%	Free throw percentage
RPG	Rebounds per game	APG	Assists per game	SPG	Steals per game
BPG	Blocks per game	PPG	Points per game	**Bold**	Career high
†	Won an NBA championship	*	Led the league

=== NBA ===
==== Regular season ====
Year	Team	GP	GS	MPG	FG%	3P%	FT%	RPG	APG	SPG	BPG	PPG
2011–12	San Antonio	64	39	24.0	.493	.376	.773	5.1	1.1	1.3	.4	7.9
2012–13	San Antonio	58	57	31.2	.494	.374	.825	6.0	1.6	1.7	.6	11.9
2013–14†	San Antonio	66	65	29.1	.522	.379	.802	6.2	2.0	1.7	.8	12.8
2014–15	San Antonio	64	64	31.8	.479	.349	.802	7.2	2.5	**2.3***	.8	16.5
2015–16	San Antonio	72	72	33.0	.506	**.443**	.874	6.8	2.6	1.8	**1.0**	21.2
2016–17	San Antonio	**74**	**74**	33.4	.485	.381	.880	5.8	3.5	1.8	.7	25.5
2017–18	San Antonio	9	9	23.3	.468	.314	.816	4.7	2.3	2.0	**1.0**	16.2
2018–19†	Toronto	60	60	34.0	.496	.371	.854	**7.3**	3.3	1.8	.4	26.6
2019–20	L.A. Clippers	57	57	32.4	.470	.378	.886	7.1	4.9	1.8	.6	27.1
2020–21	L.A. Clippers	52	52	34.1	.512	.398	.885	6.5	**5.2**	1.6	.4	24.8
2022–23	L.A. Clippers	52	50	33.6	.512	.416	.871	6.5	3.9	1.4	.5	23.8
2023–24	L.A. Clippers	68	68	**34.3**	**.525**	.417	.885	6.1	3.6	1.6	.9	23.7
2024–25	L.A. Clippers	37	37	31.9	.498	.411	.810	5.9	3.1	1.6	.5	21.5
2025–26	L.A. Clippers	65	65	32.1	.505	.387	**.892**	6.4	3.6	1.9	.4	**27.9**
Career		798	769	31.8	.499	.391	.863	6.4	3.1	1.7	.6	20.7
All-Star		7	5	20.5	.529	.436	.800	5.7	3.3	1.4	.1	17.1

==== Playoffs ====
Year	Team	GP	GS	MPG	FG%	3P%	FT%	RPG	APG	SPG	BPG	PPG
2012	San Antonio	14	14	27.1	.500	.450	.813	5.9	.6	1.2	.4	8.6
2013	San Antonio	21	21	36.9	.545	.390	.633	9.0	1.0	1.8	.5	13.5
2014†	San Antonio	23	23	32.0	.510	.419	.736	6.7	1.7	1.7	.6	14.3
2015	San Antonio	7	7	35.8	.477	.423	.771	7.4	2.6	1.1	.6	20.3
2016	San Antonio	10	10	33.9	.500	.436	.824	6.3	2.8	**2.6**	**1.4**	22.5
2017	San Antonio	12	12	35.8	.525	.455	**.931**	7.8	4.6	1.7	.5	27.7
2019†	Toronto	**24**	**24**	39.1	.490	.379	.884	9.1	3.9	1.7	.7	30.5
2020	L.A. Clippers	13	13	39.3	.489	.329	.862	**9.3**	5.5	2.3	.8	28.2
2021	L.A. Clippers	11	11	39.2	**.573**	.393	.880	7.7	4.4	2.1	.8	30.4
2023	L.A. Clippers	2	2	**40.2**	.545	**.600**	.882	6.5	**6.0**	2.0	.5	**34.5**
2024	L.A. Clippers	2	2	29.7	.458	.000	.667	8.0	2.0	2.0	.5	12.0
2025	L.A. Clippers	7	7	37.9	.537	.405	.778	7.6	4.7	1.1	.7	25.0
Career		146	146	35.6	.513	.399	.841	7.8	3.0	1.8	.7	21.5

=== College ===
Year	Team	GP	GS	MPG	FG%	3P%	FT%	RPG	APG	SPG	BPG	PPG
2009–10	San Diego State	34	33	31.3	**.455**	.205	.726	9.9	1.9	1.4	.7	12.7
2010–11	San Diego State	**36**	**36**	**32.6**	.444	**.291**	**.759**	**10.6**	**2.5**	1.4	.7	**15.5**
Career		70	69	31.9	.449	.250	.744	10.2	2.2	1.4	.7	14.1

== Awards and honors ==
NBA

- 2× NBA champion: 2014, 2019
- 2× NBA Finals MVP: 2014, 2019
- 7× NBA All-Star: 2016, 2017, 2019, 2020, 2021, 2024, 2026
- NBA All-Star MVP: 2020
- 7× All-NBA:
  - 3× All-NBA First Team: 2016, 2017, 2021
  - 4× All-NBA Second Team: 2019, 2020, 2024, 2026
- 2× NBA Defensive Player of the Year: 2015, 2016
- 7× All-Defensive Selection:
  - 3× NBA All-Defensive First Team: 2015, 2016, 2017
  - 4× NBA All-Defensive Second Team: 2014, 2019, 2020, 2021
- NBA All-Rookie First Team: 2012
- NBA steals leader: 2015
- NBA Bubble All-Seeding Games Second Team: 2020
- NBA 75th Anniversary Team (2021)

College

- Consensus second team All-American (2011)
- NABC All-American Third Team (2011)
- 2× First-team All-Mountain West (2010–2011)
- 2× All-Mountain West All-Tournament Team (2010–2011)
- All-Mountain West Defensive Team (2011)
- Mountain West tournament MVP (2010)
- Mountain West Freshman of the Year (2010)
- No. 15 retired by San Diego State Aztecs
- San Diego State Aztecs Hall of Fame – Class of 2016

High school

- California Mr. Basketball (2009)
- Martin Luther King Hall of Fame (class of 2018)

Media

- AP Athlete of the Year (2019)
- Hickok Belt (2019)

== Personal life ==
Leonard was born in Los Angeles on June 29, 1991, the son of Kim Robertson and Mark Leonard. He has four older sisters and is a cousin of NFL player Stevie Johnson. On January 18, 2008, his father was shot and killed at the car wash he owned in Compton, California. Leonard insisted on playing the next evening and broke down crying after the game. The murder is unsolved.

Leonard has been with his girlfriend Kishele Shipley, with whom he has two children, since they were in college. Known for his quiet and taciturn demeanor, he rarely gives interviews and avoids questions about his private life. He has said that he avoids both news media and social media.

In November 2018, Leonard reportedly signed a multi-year endorsement deal with New Balance, having previously signed with Air Jordan. In June 2019, he filed a federal lawsuit against Air Jordan's parent company Nike, claiming that Nike copyrighted his "Klaw" logo without his consent.

Following the January 2020 Calabasas helicopter crash that killed all nine people on board, including basketball player Kobe Bryant and his daughter Gianna, Leonard revealed that the pilot Ara Zobayan also worked as his pilot.

On May 3, 2021, Leonard took to Instagram Live for the first time, chatting with basketball player Mikey Williams and announcing that he would release a hip hop album called Culture Jam later in the year. He described the project as "merging hip-hop and basketball together". He also shared a snippet of a track titled "Everything Different" featuring YoungBoy Never Broke Again and Rod Wave. The album aimed to benefit Mamba & Mambacita, a charity created in memory of Kobe and Gianna Bryant. On July 23, he released the songs "Waves" and "Everything Different". Two months later, he had a cameo in the music video for Drake's song "Way 2 Sexy".

=== Salary cap scandal ===
On September 3, 2025, Leonard was named in a scandal involving a deal he signed with since-bankrupt fraudulent environmental company Aspiration in 2021. Investigative sportswriter Pablo Torre reported that Leonard had signed a $28 million "no-show" endorsement deal with Aspiration which had not required any action on Leonard's part, other than remaining a Clipper. Torre cited anonymous former employees of the company to allege that Leonard's deal with the company, in which Clippers' owner Steve Ballmer had invested $50 million, was a means of paying Leonard under the table to circumvent the NBA salary cap. John Karalis of the Boston Sports Journal later reported that Leonard also received an additional $20 million in Aspiration company stock, bringing Leonard's total promised compensation from the company to $48 million. The NBA responded by announcing it was investigating the matter.

The Clippers immediately denied the allegations, calling them "absurd" and "flat-out wrong" in multiple team statements. Ballmer gave an interview to ESPN's Ramona Shelburne on September 4, claiming that the team had introduced Leonard to Aspiration after signing a $300 million sponsorship agreement with the company, which is allowed under NBA rules, but had no further involvement in any endorsement deals the parties signed. He claimed that he had no knowledge of the terms of the contract Leonard had signed, and stated he was a victim of fraud by Aspiration, expressing "anger" and "sadness" for his employees.

The Toronto Star later reported that during contract talks with the Toronto Raptors in 2019, Leonard's camp wanted the team to trade for Paul George, that later reportedly led to a Thunder offer to trade Paul George and Russell Westbrook to the Raptors, in exchange for Pascal Siakam, Fred VanVleet, and four unprotected first-round picks which was later declined by the Raptors, to give him shares in the Toronto Maple Leafs (which are also owned by Maple Leaf Sports & Entertainment), and at least $10 million annually in no-show sponsorship income. The Athletic also reported that, during the 2019 free agency negotiation with the Lakers, Leonard's uncle, who was representing him in the negotiation, asked for a private aircraft, a home, guaranteed endorsement deals, and an equity stake in the team, all of which would violate the league's salary cap rules. On September 11, Torre released another podcast episode alleging that Clippers' co-owner and chairman Dennis Wong had invested $1.9 million in Aspiration nine days before Leonard was paid $1.75 million in December 2022, despite the company struggling financially at the time and laying off 20% of employees the same day the payment was made. The Clippers issued a statement to Torre that they welcomed the NBA investigation, and calling Aspiration a "house of cards".

On August 6, 2026, Torre further reported that Leonard had a second undisclosed endorsement deal with Daktronics, the company that manufactured video boards for the Clippers' Intuit Dome stadium. Anonymous sources within both the Clippers and Daktronics alleged the deal was a way of circumventing the salary cap. The NBA later ruled against the Clippers franchise, and stripped them of five first-round picks, and issued a $30 million fine and a suspension to owner Steve Ballmer. Leonard also had to pay a restitution of $700,000 for facilitating improper benefits.

== See also ==
- List of NBA career free throw percentage leaders
- List of NBA career playoff scoring leaders
- List of NBA career playoff steals leaders
- List of NBA career playoff 3-point scoring leaders
