= 2011 NCAA Men's Basketball All-Americans =

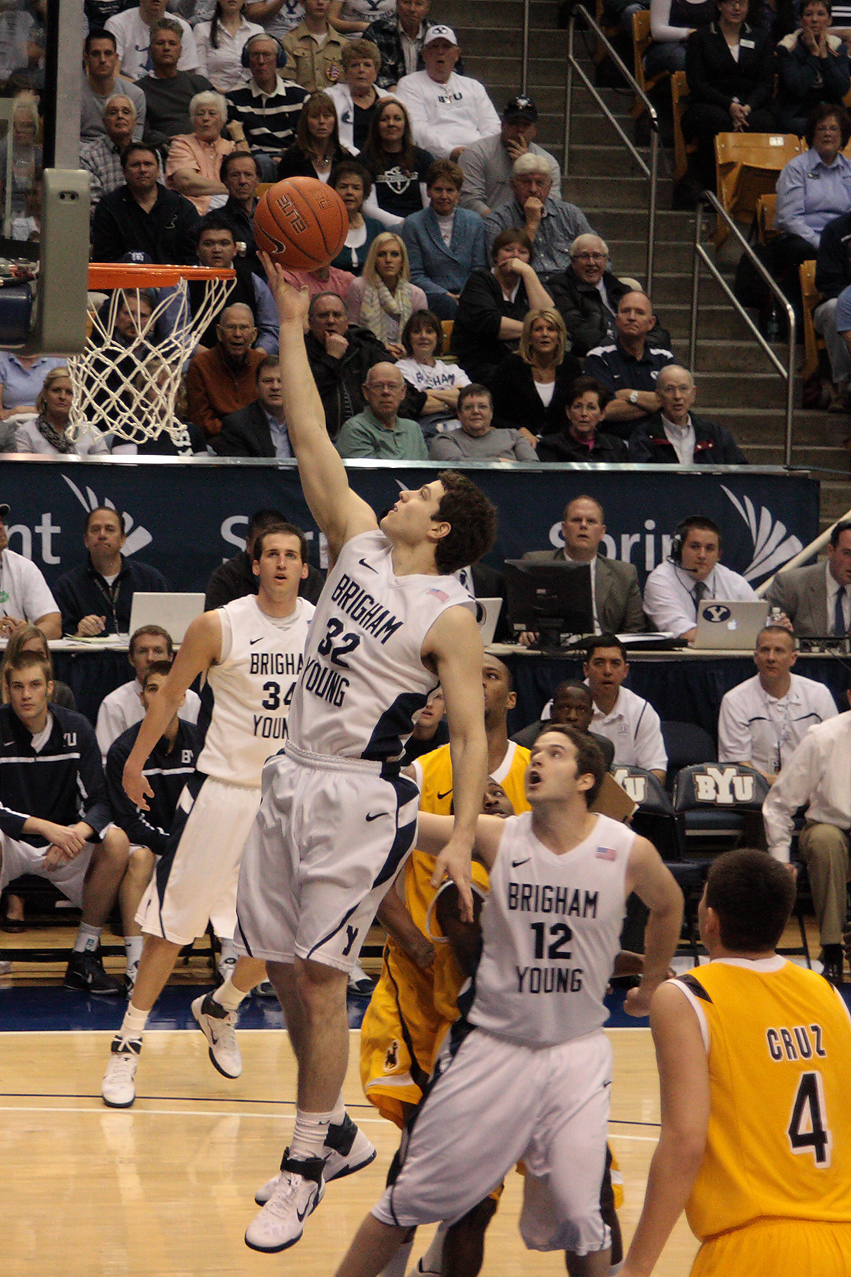
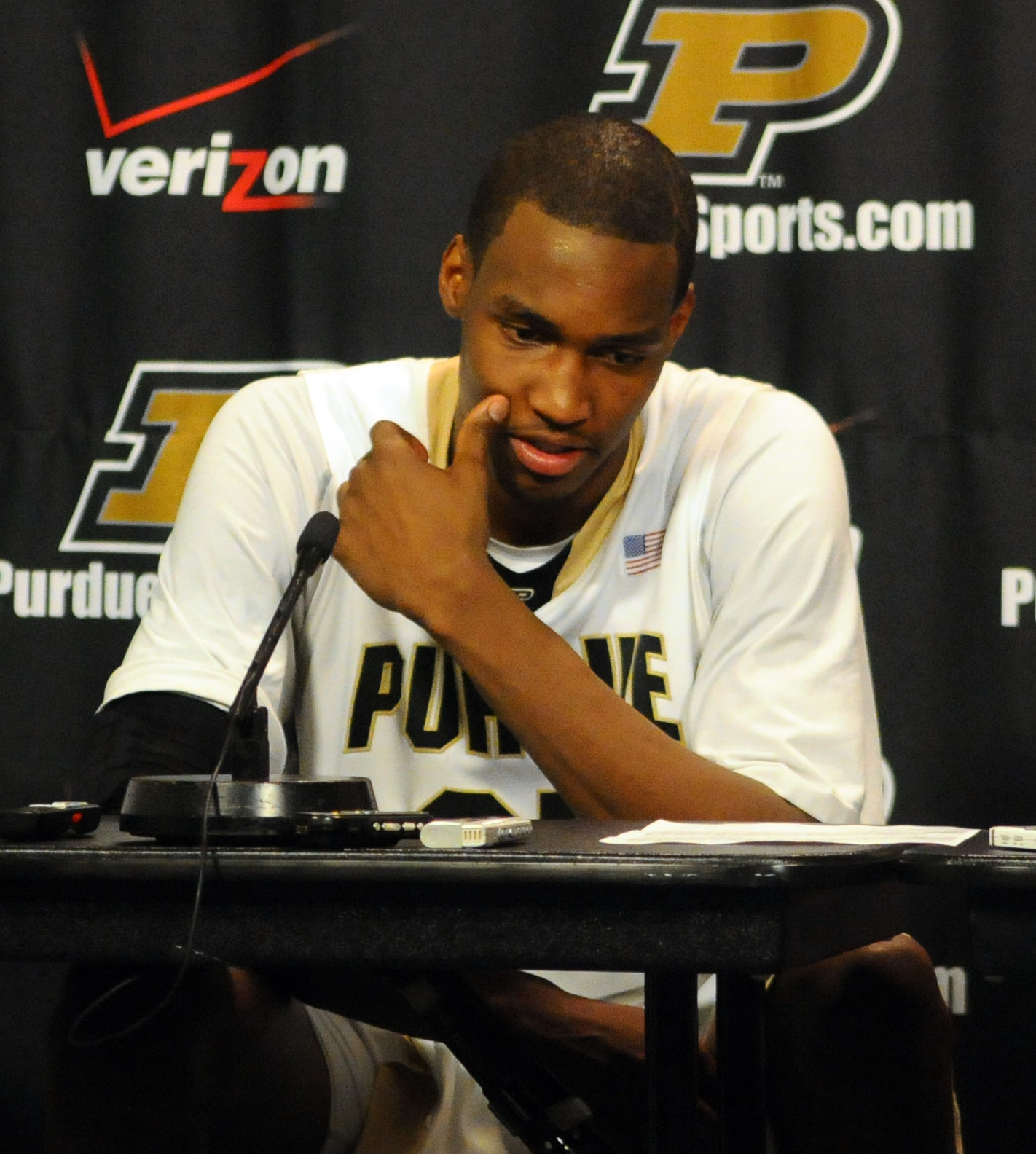
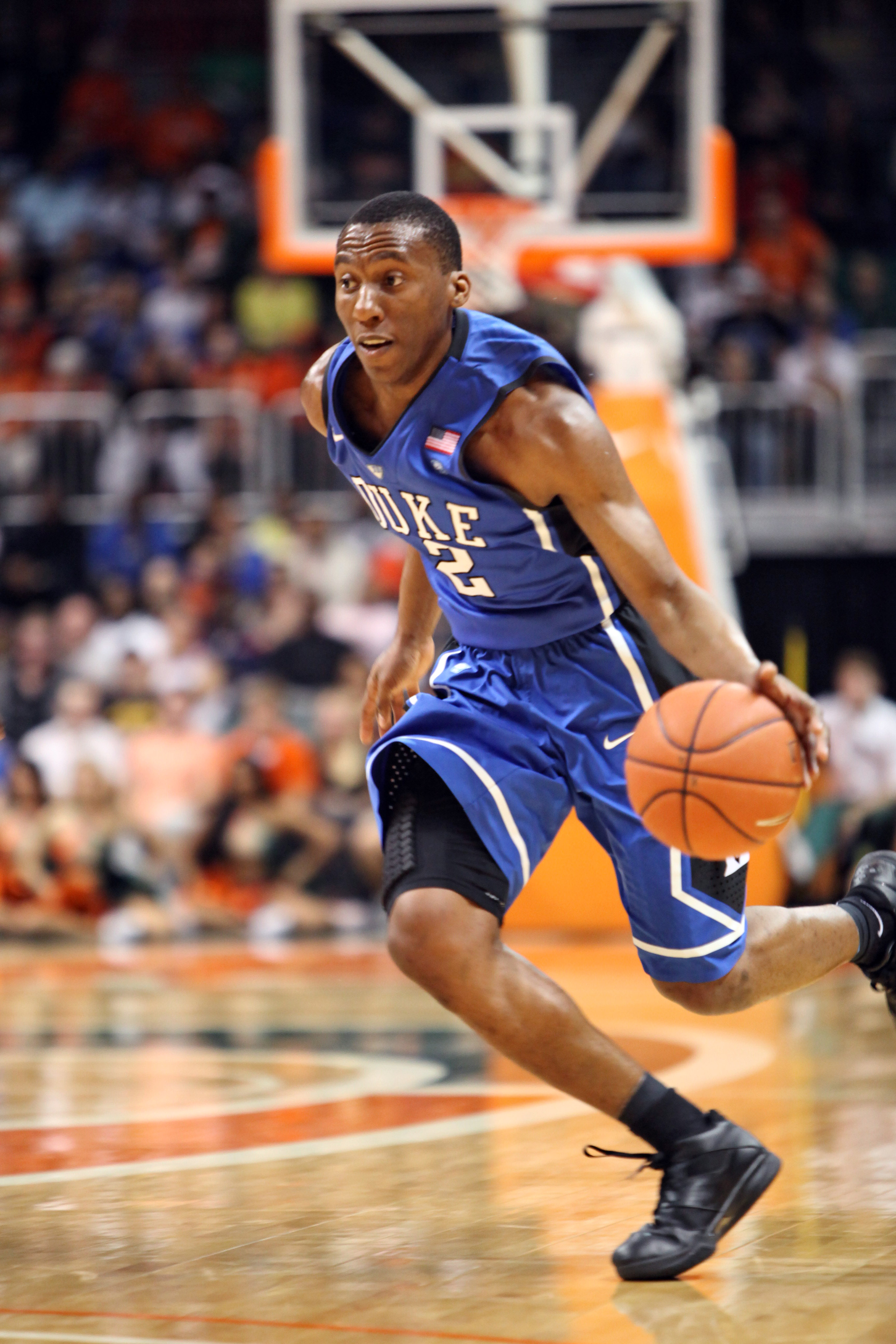
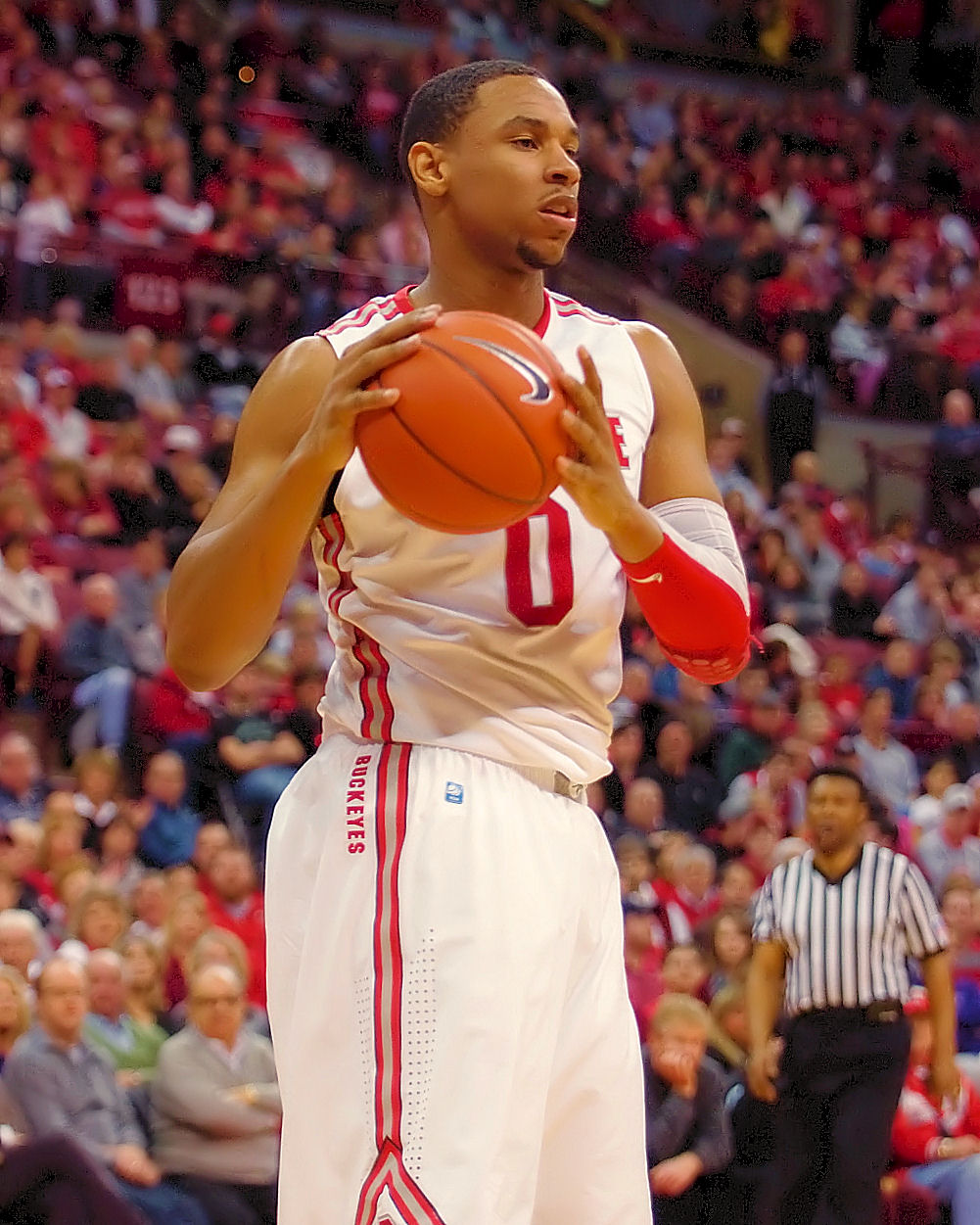
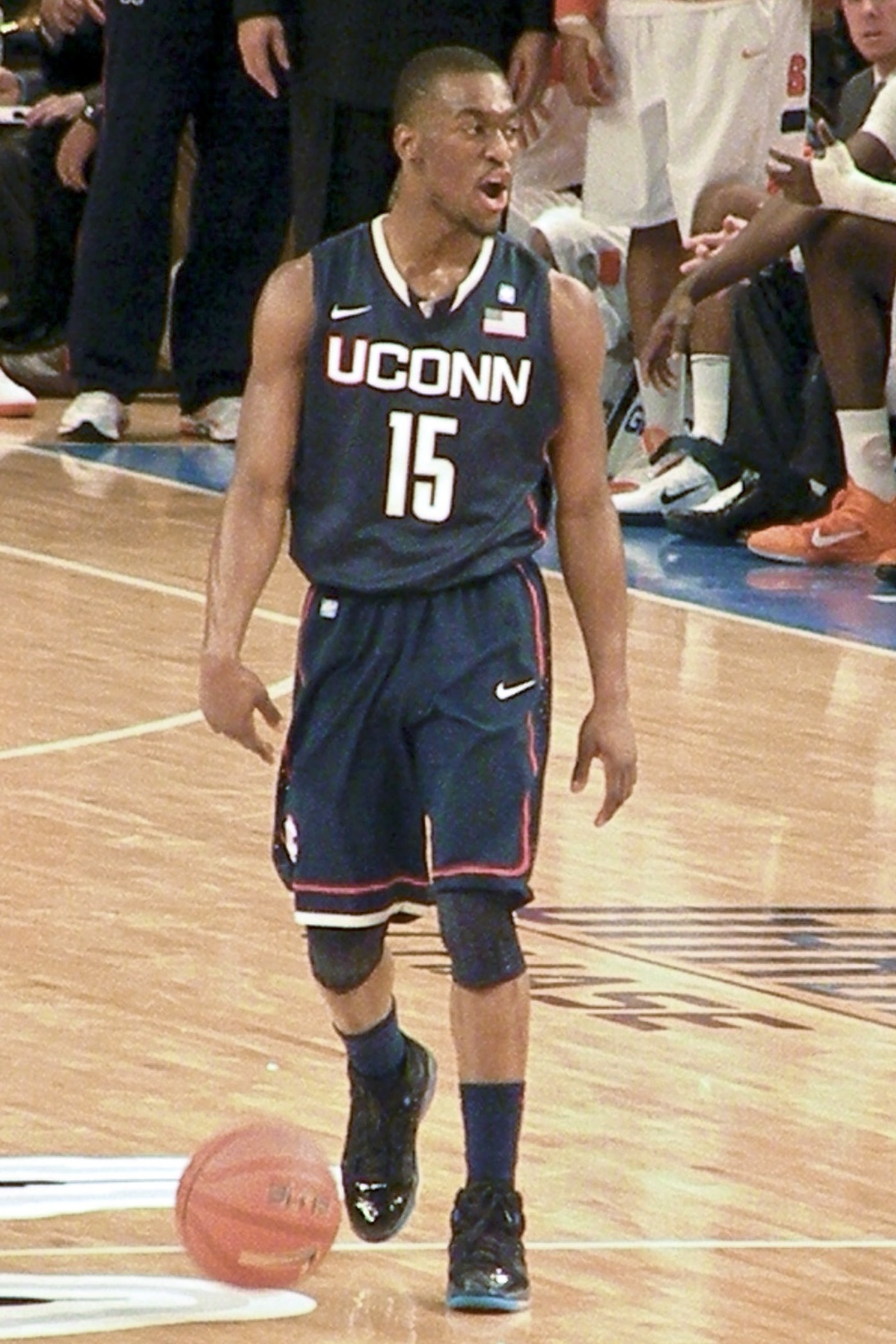
- The 2011 consensus first team. Clockwise from top left: Fredette, Johnson, Walker, Sullinger, Smith.
- Awarded for: 2010–11 NCAA Division I men's basketball season

An All-American team is an honorary sports team composed of the best amateur players of a specific season for each team position—who in turn are given the honorific "All-America" and typically referred to as "All-American athletes", or simply "All-Americans". Although the honorees generally do not compete together as a unit, the term is used in U.S. team sports to refer to players who are selected by members of the national media. Walter Camp selected the first All-America team in the early days of American football in 1889. The 2011 NCAA Men's Basketball All-Americans are honorary lists that include All-American selections from the Associated Press (AP), the United States Basketball Writers Association (USBWA), the Sporting News (TSN), and the National Association of Basketball Coaches (NABC) for the 2010–11 NCAA Division I men's basketball season. All selectors choose at least a first and second 5-man team. The NABC, TSN and AP choose third teams, while AP also lists honorable mention selections.

The Consensus 2011 College Basketball All-American team is determined by aggregating the results of the four major All-American teams as determined by the National Collegiate Athletic Association (NCAA). Since United Press International was replaced by TSN in 1997, the four major selectors have been the aforementioned ones. AP has been a selector since 1948, NABC since 1957 and USBWA since 1960. To earn "consensus" status, a player must win honors based on a point system computed from the four different all-America teams. The point system consists of three points for first team, two points for second team and one point for third team. No honorable mention or fourth team or lower are used in the computation. The top five totals plus ties are first team and the next five plus ties are second team.

Although the aforementioned lists are used to determine consensus honors, there are numerous other All-American lists. The ten finalists for the John Wooden Award are described as Wooden All-Americans. The ten finalists for the Lowe's Senior CLASS Award are described as Senior All-Americans. Other All-American lists include those determined by Fox Sports, and Yahoo! Sports. The scholar-athletes selected by College Sports Information Directors of America (CoSIDA) are termed Academic All-Americans.

== 2011 Consensus All-America team ==
The following players are recognized as the 2011 Consensus All-Americans:

PG – Point guard
SG – Shooting guard
PF – Power forward
SF – Small forward
C – Center

Consensus First Team
Player	Position	Class	Team
Jimmer Fredette	PG	Senior	Brigham Young
JaJuan Johnson	C	Senior	Purdue
Nolan Smith	PG-SG	Senior	Duke
Jared Sullinger	PF-C	Freshman	Ohio State
Kemba Walker	PG	Junior	Connecticut

Consensus Second Team
Player	Position	Class	Team
Kenneth Faried	PF-C	Senior	Morehead State
Jordan Hamilton	SG-SF	Sophomore	Texas
Ben Hansbrough	PG	Senior	Notre Dame
Kawhi Leonard	PF	Sophomore	San Diego State
Marcus Morris	PF-C	Junior	Kansas
Jordan Taylor	PG	Junior	Wisconsin
Derrick Williams	SF-PF	Sophomore	Arizona

== Individual All-America teams ==
=== By player ===
Player	School	AP	USBWA	NABC	TSN	CP	Notes
Jimmer Fredette	BYU	1	1	1	1	12	National Player of the Year (AP, NABC, Naismith, Rupp, Robertson, TSN, Wooden), Lowe's Senior CLASS Award, season scoring leader
JaJuan Johnson	Purdue	1	1	1	1	12	Pete Newell Big Man Award
Nolan Smith	Duke	1	1	1	1	12	National Player of the Year (FOX)
Jared Sullinger	Ohio State	1	1	1	1	12	USBWA National Freshman of the Year
Kemba Walker	Connecticut	1	1	1	1	12	Lute Olson Award, Bob Cousy Award, NCAA basketball tournament Most Outstanding Player
Ben Hansbrough	Notre Dame	2	2	2	2	8	—
Marcus Morris	Kansas	2	2	2	2	8	—
Derrick Williams	Arizona	2	2	2	2	8	—
Jordan Hamilton	Texas	3	2	2	3	6	—
Kenneth Faried	Morehead State	3	2	3	3	5	Season rebounding leader
Kawhi Leonard	San Diego State	2	-	3	2	5	—
Jordan Taylor	Wisconsin	2	-	3	2	5	—
Jacob Pullen	Kansas State	3	-	3	3	3	Frances Pomeroy Naismith Award
Tu Holloway	Xavier	3	-	-	3	2	—
Kyle Singler	Duke	-	-	2	-	2	—
Marshon Brooks	Providence	3	-	-	-	1	—
Charles Jenkins	Hofstra	-	-	-	3	1	—
E'Twaun Moore	Purdue	-	-	3	-	1	—

=== By team ===
All-America Team
All-America Team	First team		Second team		Third team	
All-America Team	Player	School	Player	School	Player	School
Associated Press	Jimmer Fredette	Brigham Young	Ben Hansbrough	Notre Dame	Marshon Brooks	Providence
Associated Press	JaJuan Johnson	Purdue	Kawhi Leonard	San Diego State	Kenneth Faried	Morehead State
Associated Press	Nolan Smith	Duke	Marcus Morris	Kansas	Jordan Hamilton	Texas
Associated Press	Jared Sullinger	Ohio State	Jordan Taylor	Wisconsin	Tu Holloway	Xavier
Associated Press	Kemba Walker	Connecticut	Derrick Williams	Arizona	Jacob Pullen	Kansas State
USBWA	Jimmer Fredette	Brigham Young	Kenneth Faried	Morehead State	No third team	
USBWA	JaJuan Johnson	Purdue	Jordan Hamilton	Texas	No third team	
USBWA	Nolan Smith	Duke	Ben Hansbrough	Notre Dame	No third team	
USBWA	Jared Sullinger	Ohio State	Marcus Morris	Kansas	No third team	
USBWA	Kemba Walker	Connecticut	Derrick Williams	Arizona	No third team	
NABC	Jimmer Fredette	Brigham Young	Jordan Hamilton	Texas	Kenneth Faried	Morehead State
NABC	JaJuan Johnson	Purdue	Ben Hansbrough	Notre Dame	Kawhi Leonard	San Diego State
NABC	Nolan Smith	Duke	Marcus Morris	Kansas	E'Twaun Moore	Purdue
NABC	Jared Sullinger	Ohio State	Kyle Singler	Duke	Jacob Pullen	Kansas State
NABC	Kemba Walker	Connecticut	Derrick Williams	Arizona	Jordan Taylor	Wisconsin
Sporting News	Jimmer Fredette	Brigham Young	Ben Hansbrough	Notre Dame	Kenneth Faried	Morehead State
Sporting News	JaJuan Johnson	Purdue	Kawhi Leonard	San Diego State	Jordan Hamilton	Texas
Sporting News	Nolan Smith	Duke	Marcus Morris	Kansas	Tu Holloway	Xavier
Sporting News	Jared Sullinger	Ohio State	Jordan Taylor	Wisconsin	Charles Jenkins	Hofstra
Sporting News	Kemba Walker	Connecticut	Derrick Williams	Arizona	Jacob Pullen	Kansas State

AP Honorable Mention:

- Harrison Barnes, North Carolina
- Talor Battle, Penn State
- Devon Beitzel, Northern Colorado
- Keith Benson, Oakland
- Solomon Bozeman, Arkansas-Little Rock
- Alec Burks, Colorado
- Gilberto Clavell, Sam Houston State
- Norris Cole, Cleveland State
- Malcolm Delaney, Virginia Tech
- Austin Freeman, Georgetown
- Ashton Gibbs, Pittsburgh
- Andrew Goudelock, College of Charleston
- Justin Greene, Kent State
- Dwight Hardy, St. John's
- John Holland, Boston University
- Ken Horton, Central Connecticut State
- Reggie Jackson, Boston College
- Rick Jackson, Syracuse
- Charles Jenkins, Hofstra
- John Jenkins, Vanderbilt
- Aaron Johnson, UAB
- Terrence Jones, Kentucky
- Travele Jones, Texas Southern
- Brandon Knight, Kentucky
- Jon Leuer, Wisconsin
- Mickey McConnell, Saint Mary's
- E'Twaun Moore, Purdue
- Markieff Morris, Kansas
- Mike Muscala, Bucknell
- Chandler Parsons, Florida
- C. J. Reed, Bethune-Cookman
- Ryan Rossiter, Siena
- Jesse Sanders, Liberty
- Kyle Singler, Duke
- Mike Smith, East Tennessee State
- Isaiah Thomas, Washington
- Tristan Thompson, Texas
- Nikola Vucevic, Southern California
- Brad Wanamaker, Pittsburgh
- Casper Ware, Long Beach State
- Kyle Weems, Missouri State
- Tai Wesley, Utah State
- Jordan Williams, Maryland
- Isiah Williams, Utah Valley
- Keith Wright, Harvard

== Academic All-Americans ==
On February 22, 2011, CoSIDA and ESPN The Magazine announced the 2011 Academic All-America team, with Matt Howard headlining the University Division as the men's college basketball Academic All-American of the Year. The following is the 2010–11 ESPN The Magazine Academic All-America Men's Basketball Team (University Division) as selected by CoSIDA:

First Team
Player	School	Class	GPA and major
Tim Abromaitis	Notre Dame	Senior	3.72 Finance/MBA
Devon Beitzel	Northern Colorado	Senior	3.69 Finance Accounting
Matt Howard	Butler	Senior	3.77 Finance
Tyrel Reed	Kansas	Senior	3.65 Pre-Physical Therapy/Ex.Sci.
Tyler Zeller	North Carolina	Junior	3.56 Business Administration

Second Team
Player	School	Class	GPA and major
Nathan Hedgecock	Army	Senior	4.00 Mech. Engineering Management
Blake Hoffarber	Minnesota	Senior	3.50 Finance
Levi Knutson	Colorado	Senior	3.92 Business Administration
Garrett Leffelman	Brown	Senior	3.89 Economics, Political Science
Jalin Thomas	Central Michigan	Senior	3.65 Sport Studies

Third Team
Player	School	Class	GPA and major
Riley Benock	Mississippi State	Senior	3.97 Kinesiology, Physical Educ.
Will Creekmore	Missouri State	Senior	3.67 Finance
Scott Saunders	Belmont	Junior	3.84 Finance
Drew Spradlin	Elon	Junior	3.65 Political Science
Chris Wroblewski	Cornell	Junior	3.61 App. Economics & Management

== Senior All-Americans ==
The ten finalists for the Lowe's Senior CLASS Award are called Senior All-Americans. The 10 honorees are as follows:

Player	School
Devon Beitzel	Northern Colorado
Dodie Dunson	Bradley
Jimmer Fredette	BYU
Matt Howard	Butler
Cameron Jones	Northern Arizona
Jon Leuer	Wisconsin
David Lighty	Ohio State
E'Twaun Moore	Purdue
Tyrel Reed	Kansas
Kyle Singler	Duke
