= Devon Beitzel =

American basketball player

Personal information
- Born: February 24, 1988 (age 38) Lafayette, Colorado, U.S.
- Listed height: 6 ft 1 in (1.85 m)
- Listed weight: 180 lb (82 kg)

Career information
- High school: Centaurus (Lafayette, Colorado)
- College: Northern Colorado (2007–2011)
- NBA draft: 2011: undrafted
- Playing career: 2011–2012
- Position: Point guard

Career history
- 2011–2012: San Martín de Corrientes

Career highlights
- Big Sky Player of the Year (2011); First-team All-Big Sky (2011); Second-team All-Big Sky (2010); First-team Academic All-American (2011)

Devon Beitzel (born February 24, 1988) is an American former professional basketball point guard. He played college basketball for Northern Colorado. As a redshirt senior in 2010–11, he averaged 21.5 points and 3.3 rebounds per game. Beitzel was named Big Sky Conference Men's Basketball Player of the Year and led the Bears to their first NCAA Tournament berth in school history. Beitzel also received national recognition in 2011 as a first team Academic All-American, a Lowe's Senior CLASS Award finalist and an AP honorable mention All-American.

In November 2011, Beitzel signed with San Martín de Corrientes of Argentina's A League. Beitzel played one season of professional basketball in Argentina before returning to the United States to enter a career in business, joining Federated Insurance in Minnesota. Two years later, he became a sales executive for Flood & Peterson Insurance in Greeley, Colorado.
