= John S. Davis =

American coach and college athletics administrator

- Davis pictured in the 1928 Ottawa University yearbook

Biographical details
- Born: October 21, 1898; Williamsburg, Kansas, U.S.
- Died: February 16, 1985 (aged 86); Fort Collins, Colorado, U.S.
- Education: Ottawa University (1922)

Coaching career (HC unless noted)

Football
- 1930: Ottawa (KS)

Basketball
- 1927–1931: Ottawa (KS)
- 1931–1937: Colorado Teachers / Colorado State–Greeley
- 1937–1945: Colorado A&M

Administrative career (AD unless noted)
- 1927–1931: Ottawa (KS)

Head coaching record
- Overall: 1–6 (football); 152–162 (basketball)

John Solomon "Sap" Davis (October 21, 1898 – February 16, 1985) was an American college football and college basketball coach and athletics administrator. He served as head football coach at Ottawa University in Ottawa, Kansas for one season, in 1930, compiling a record of 1–6. Davis was also the athletic director and head basketball coach at Ottawa from 1927 to 1931. He moved to the State Normal School of Colorado—now known as the University of Northern Colorado—in 1931 to replace George E. Cooper as head basketball coach. In 1937, Davis was hired as the head basketball coach at Colorado State College of Agriculture and Mechanic Arts—now known as Colorado State University.

== Head coaching record ==
=== Football ===
Year	Team	Overall	Conference	Standing	Bowl/playoffs
Ottawa Braves (Kansas Collegiate Athletic Conference) (1930)
1930	Ottawa	1–6	0–4	T–5th	
Ottawa:		1–6	0–4		
Total:		1–6			
