= Antonine University =

Private university in Baabda, Lebanon

Coordinates: 33°50′15″N 35°32′11″E

Antonine University - UA
- الجامعـــة الأنطونيـــة
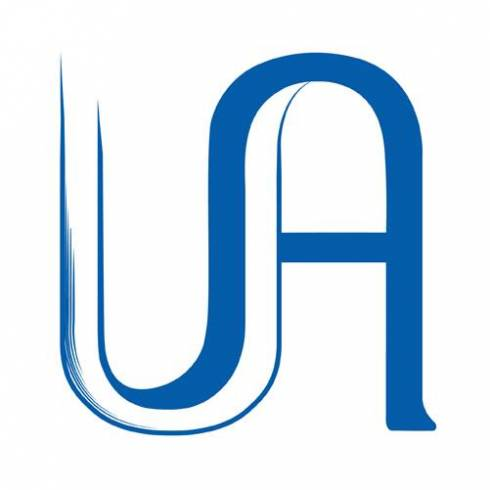
- Motto: “Education in Service of Human Flourishing”
- Type: Private
- Established: 1996; 30 years ago
- Religious affiliation: Catholic
- Rector: Fr. Michel Saghbiny
- Students: 5000
- Location: Hadat–Baabda, Mount Lebanon, Lebanon
- Campus: Suburban, 15.70 acres (63,500 m^{2})
- Mascot: Sunbula

Antonine University (UA) is a Lebanese Catholic university committed to offer quality education, to promote inter-disciplinary and contextualised research, and to enhance the sustainable wellbeing of its local and global communities.

== History ==
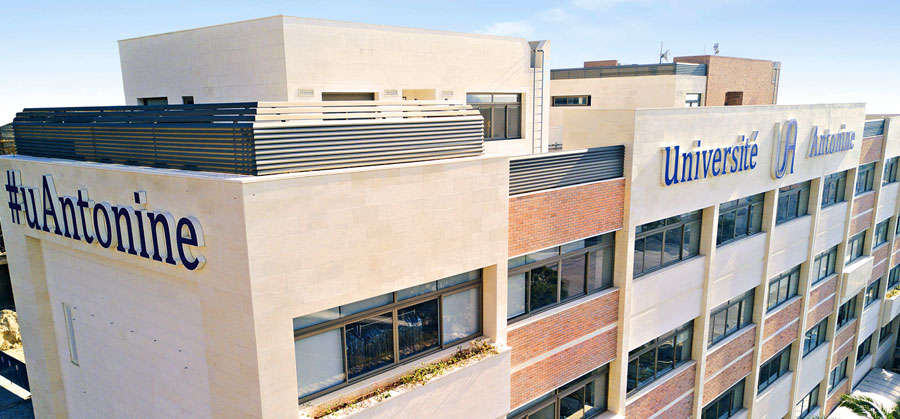

Founded in 1996, Antonine University (Université Antonine) is a private higher education institution located in the city of Baabda, Mount Lebanon. This institution has three campuses in the following locations:

- Hadat–Baabda Campus
- Nabi Ayla–Zahle Campus
- Mejdlaya–Zgharta Campus

Antonine University offers courses and programs leading to higher education degrees in several areas of study.

== Main Campus ==
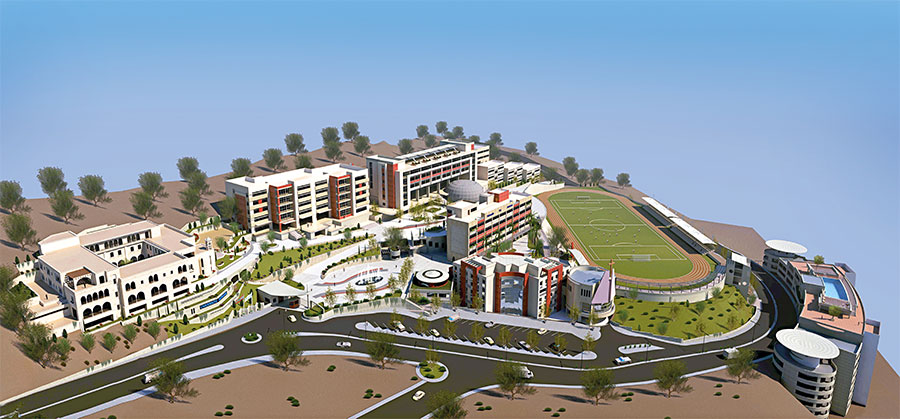

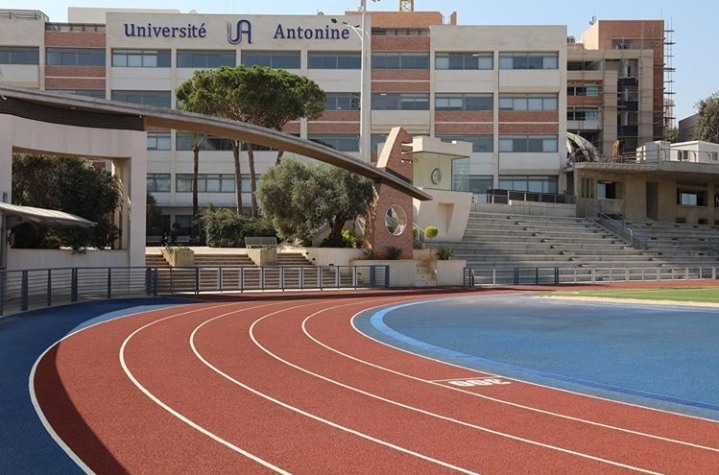

== Faculties ==
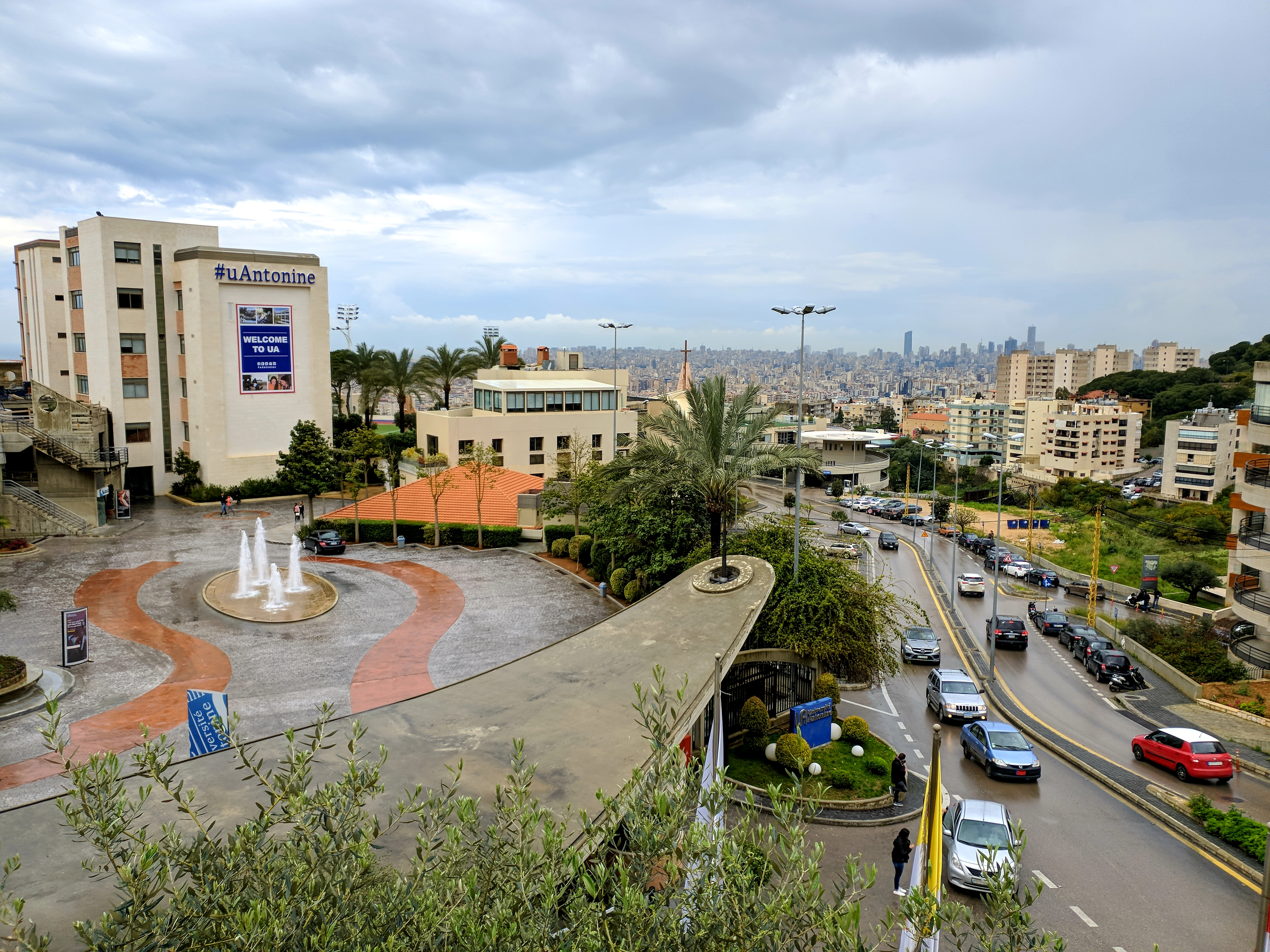

Université Antonine has seven faculties:

- Antonine School of Business
- Faculty of Engineering and Technology
- Faculty of Information and Communication
- Faculty of Music and Musicology
- Faculty of Public Health
- Faculty of Sport Sciences
- Faculty of Theology

== Development and construction ==
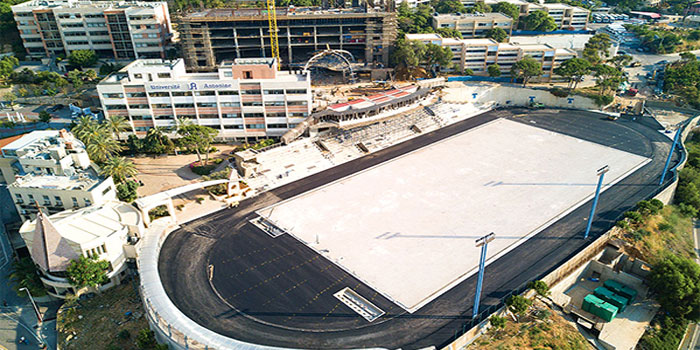
