= Mike Higgins (basketball) =

American basketball player (born 1967)

Personal information
- Born: February 17, 1967 (age 59) Grand Island, Nebraska
- Listed height: 6 ft 9 in (2.06 m)
- Listed weight: 220 lb (100 kg)

Career information
- High school: Greeley West (Greeley, Colorado)
- College: Northern Colorado (1985–1989)
- NBA draft: 1989: undrafted
- Playing career: 1989–2010
- Position: Power forward
- Number: 55, 42, 32

Career history
- 1989: Los Angeles Lakers
- 1989–1990: Denver Nuggets
- 1990: Rapid City Thrillers
- 1990: Valvi Girona
- 1990–1991: Yakima Sun Kings
- 1991: Sacramento Kings
- 1991: BCM Gravelines
- 1991: Puleva Granada
- 1991–1992: Fulgor Libertas Forlì
- 1992–1993: Omaha Racers
- 1993–1994: CB Gran Canaria
- 1994–1995: Estudiantes de Bahía Blanca
- 1995–1996: Peñarol de Mar del Plata
- 1996–1998: Isuzu Giga Cats
- 1998–1999: Grand Rapids Hoops
- 1999: Franca
- 1999–2000: Boca Juniors
- 2000–2001: Fluminense
- 2001–2002: Londrina
- 2002: Bilbao Berri
- 2003–2004: CB Cáceres
- 2004–2006: León Caja España
- 2006–2007: Cantabria Lobos
- 2007–2008: CAI Zaragoza
- 2008: CB Granada
- 2008–2009: Gandía Bàsquet
- 2009–2010: Xacobeo Blu:sens

Career highlights
- CBA champion (1993); JBL Field Goal Percentage Leader (1997)
- Stats at NBA.com
- Stats at Basketball Reference

Michael S. Higgins (born February 17, 1967) is an American retired professional basketball player.

A 6'9" power forward born in Grand Island, Nebraska and from the University of Northern Colorado, Higgins played two seasons (1989–1991) in the National Basketball Association (NBA) as a member of the Los Angeles Lakers, Denver Nuggets, and Sacramento Kings. He averaged 1.7 points per game in his NBA career. He later joined Obradoiro CAB.

Higgins also played several seasons in the Continental Basketball Association (CBA), for the Rapid City Thrillers, Yakima Sun Kings, Omaha Racers and Grand Rapids Hoops. He won a CBA championship with the Racers in 1993.

== Career statistics ==
Legend
GP	Games played	GS	Games started	MPG	Minutes per game
FG%	Field goal percentage	3P%	3-point field goal percentage	FT%	Free throw percentage
RPG	Rebounds per game	APG	Assists per game	SPG	Steals per game
BPG	Blocks per game	PPG	Points per game	**Bold**	Career high

=== NBA ===
==== Regular season ====
Year	Team	GP	GS	MPG	FG%	3P%	FT%	RPG	APG	SPG	BPG	PPG
1989–90	L.A. Lakers	6	0	3.0	–	–	.500	.2	.2	**.2**	**.3**	.2
1989–90	Denver	5	0	6.4	.375	–	**.875**	.6	**.4**	**.2**	.0	**2.6**
1990–91	Sacramento	**7**	0	**8.7**	**.600**	–	.571	**.7**	.3	.0	**.3**	2.3
Career		18	0	6.2	.500	–	.706	.5	.3	.1	.2	1.7
