= Paul Abbott (basketball) =

American basketball coach

Coaching career (HC unless noted)
- 1916–1917: Northern Colorado

Head coaching record
- Overall: 5–7

Paul Abbott was a basketball coach for the Northern Colorado Bears from 1916 to 1917, with a one-year record of 5–7 or a .417 win–loss ratio for the school's men's team.
