= Jeff Linder =

American basketball coach (born 1977)

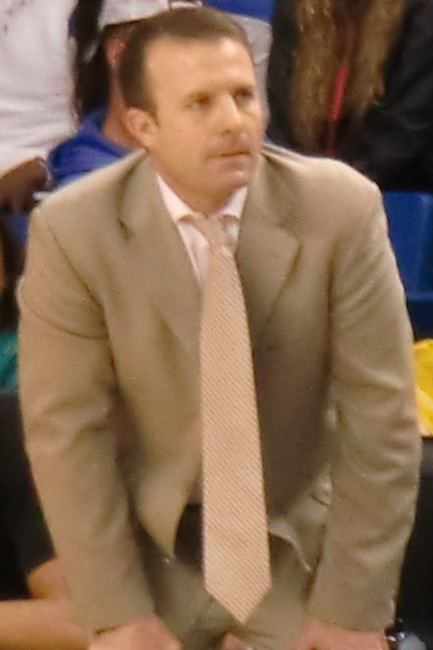
- Linder in 2016 with Boise State

Current position
- Title: Assistant coach
- Team: Texas Tech
- Conference: Big 12

Biographical details
- Born: June 21, 1977 (age 49); Denver, Colorado, U.S.

Playing career
- 1995–1996: Mesa State
- 1997–2000: Western State
- Position: Point guard

Coaching career (HC unless noted)
- 2001–2004: Emporia State (assistant)
- 2004–2006: Midland (assistant)
- 2006–2008: Weber State (assistant)
- 2008–2010: San Francisco (assistant)
- 2010–2016: Boise State (assistant)
- 2016–2020: Northern Colorado
- 2020–2024: Wyoming
- 2024–present: Texas Tech (assistant)

Administrative career (AD unless noted)
- 2000–2001: Colorado (asst. director of basketball operations)

Head coaching record
- Overall: 143–109 (.567)
- Tournaments: 0–1 (NCAA Division I); 4–0 (CIT)

Accomplishments and honors

Championships
- CIT (2018)

Awards
- Big Sky Coach of the Year (2019)

Jeffrey Michael Linder (born June 21, 1977) is an American college basketball coach and current men's assistant basketball coach at Texas Tech. Linder was previously an assistant coach at Emporia State, Midland, Weber State, San Francisco, and Boise State from 2001 to 2016.

From 2016 to 2020, Linder was head coach at Northern Colorado. In the midst of an NCAA investigation and sanctions over rules violations from the previous head coach, Linder led Northern Colorado to three straight winning seasons and the 2018 CollegeInsider.com Postseason Tournament title. In 2019, the Big Sky Conference named Linder the Coach of the Year in men's basketball. Linder became head coach at Wyoming in 2020 where he coached the team for 4 seasons and posted an overall record of 63-59 before resigning in May 2024, to take an assistant coaching position with Texas Tech.

== Early life and education ==
Born on June 21, 1977, in Denver, Linder grew up in Lafayette, Colorado, and graduated from Centaurus High School in 1995. After high school, Linder first attended Mesa State College (now Colorado Mesa University) on a basketball scholarship. In 1997, Linder transferred to Western State College of Colorado (now Western Colorado University), where he played basketball from 1997 to 2000 playing at point guard. As a senior in 1999–2000, Linder was an All-Rocky Mountain Athletic Conference honorable mention for averaging 4.9 assists per game, second best in the conference.

== Coaching career ==
=== Early coaching career (2000–2016) ===
In 2000, Linder got his first college basketball job as assistant director of basketball operations under Ricardo Patton at Colorado. He then was an assistant at Emporia State from 2001 to 2004 under David Moe and Midland College from 2004 to 2006 under Grant McCasland.

Returning to NCAA Division I, Linder became an assistant coach at Weber State under Randy Rahe in 2006. At Weber State, Linder helped guide the 2006–07 team to Big Sky Conference regular season and tournament titles, resulting in an appearance in the NCAA tournament. Linder also helped recruit future top-10 NBA Draft pick Damian Lillard.

Then in 2008, Linder was an assistant coach at San Francisco under Rex Walters, who promoted Linder to associate head coach in 2009. San Francisco upset no. 8 Gonzaga 81–77 in overtime on January 30, 2010.

From 2010 to 2016, Linder was an assistant coach at Boise State; he was the associate head coach beginning in 2013. Linder helped Boise State qualify for the NCAA Tournament in 2013 and 2015, the first at-large NCAA bids in program history. Boise State led the Mountain West Conference in points per game in three of his first five seasons and shared the 2014–15 Mountain West regular season title with San Diego State.

=== Northern Colorado (2016–2020) ===
On May 1, 2016, Linder was hired by Northern Colorado as the 19th men's basketball head coach in program history. Linder entered Northern Colorado after the firing of B. J. Hill for numerous NCAA rules violations. After an 11–18 debut season in 2016–17, Linder led Northern Colorado to three straight seasons with 20 or more wins. The 2017–18 team had a school record 26 wins and won the 2018 CollegeInsider.com Postseason Tournament.

In 2018–19, Linder was named the Big Sky Conference Coach of the Year after leading Northern Colorado to an all time best 15–5 conference record. Northern Colorado went 15–5 in Big Sky play again in 2019–20.

=== Wyoming (2020–2024) ===
On March 17, 2020, Linder was hired at Wyoming as the 22nd head coach in program history. Inheriting a team that won only two conference games, Linder led Wyoming to a 14–11 (7–9 Mountain West Conference) regular season record in his debut season. Linder posted an overall record of 63-59 at Wyoming before he resigned on March 10, 2024, to take an assistant coach position at Texas Tech.

== Head coaching record ==
Record table
Season	Team	Overall	Conference	Standing	Postseason
Northern Colorado Bears (Big Sky Conference) (2016–2020)
2016–17	Northern Colorado	11–18	7–11	8th	
2017–18	Northern Colorado	26–12	11–7	5th	CIT champion
2018–19	Northern Colorado	21–11	15–5	2nd	
2019–20	Northern Colorado	22–9	15–5	2nd	
Northern Colorado:		80–50 (.615)	48–28 (.632)		
Wyoming Cowboys (Mountain West Conference) (2020–2024)
2020–21	Wyoming	14–11	7–9	8th	
2021–22	Wyoming	25–9	13–5	4th	NCAA Division I First Four
2022–23	Wyoming	9–22	4–14	11th	
2023–24	Wyoming	15–17	8–10	8th	
Wyoming:		63–59 (.516)	32–38 (.457)		
Total:		143–109 (.567)			
National champion Postseason invitational champion Conference regular season champion Conference regular season and conference tournament champion Division regular season champion Division regular season and conference tournament champion Conference tournament champion
