= William E. Search =

American football coach

Coaching career (HC unless noted)
- 1919–1921: Colorado State Teachers

Head coaching record
- Overall: 1–10–1

William E. Search was an American football coach. He served as the head football coach at Colorado State Teachers College—now known as the University of Northern Colorado—in Greeley, Colorado for three seasons, from 1919 to 1921, compiling a record of 1–10–1.
