= 2018 CollegeInsider.com Postseason Tournament =

Single-elimination tournament of NCAA Division I basketball teams

- Season: 2017–18
- Teams: 20
- Finals site: Bank of Colorado Arena; Greeley, Colorado
- Champions: Northern Colorado (1st title)
- Runner-up: UIC (1st title game)
- Semifinalists: Liberty (1st semifinal); Sam Houston State (1st semifinal)
- Winning coach: Jeff Linder (1st title)
- MVP: Andre Spight (Northern Colorado)
- Attendance: 26,023

The 2018 CollegeInsider.com Postseason Tournament (CIT) was a postseason single-elimination tournament of NCAA Division I basketball teams. The tournament began on March 12, 2018, and concluded on March 30, 2018.

The field was composed of participants who belong to "mid-major" conferences and who were not invited to the NCAA tournament, the National Invitation Tournament, or the College Basketball Invitational.

== Participating teams ==
The following teams received an invitation to the 2018 CIT:

| Team | Conference | Overall record | Conference record |
|---|---|---|---|
| Abilene Christian | Southland | 16–15 | 8–10 |
| Austin Peay | OVC | 18–14 | 12–6 |
| Central Michigan | MAC | 19–14 | 7–11 |
| Drake | MVC | 16–16 | 10–8 |
| Eastern Michigan | MAC | 21–12 | 11–7 |
| Fort Wayne | Summit | 18–14 | 7–7 |
| Hartford | America East | 19–13 | 11–5 |
| Lamar | Southland | 19–13 | 11–7 |
| Liberty | Big South | 20–14 | 9–9 |
| Louisiana–Monroe | Sun Belt | 16–15 | 9–9 |
| Niagara | MAAC | 19–13 | 12–6 |
| North Carolina A&T | MEAC | 20–14 | 11–5 |
| Northern Colorado | Big Sky | 22–12 | 11–7 |
| Portland State | Big Sky | 20–13 | 9–9 |
| Saint Francis (PA) | NEC | 18–12 | 12–6 |
| Sam Houston State | Southland | 19–14 | 12–6 |
| San Diego | WCC | 18–13 | 9–9 |
| UIC | Horizon | 17–15 | 12–6 |
| UTSA | C-USA | 19–14 | 11–7 |
| Wofford | Southern | 21–12 | 11–7 |

== Format ==
The CIT uses the old NIT model in which there is no set bracket. Future round opponents are determined by the results of the previous round.

=== Postseason classics ===
In 2016, the CIT introduced the Coach John McLendon Classic as the first "Classic" game to ever be played during a postseason tournament. For 2017, the CIT introduced three more "Classic" games, for a total of four, all to be played in the first round. In 2018, a fifth "Classic" was added.

Coach John McLendon Classic
Hugh Durham Classic
Lou Henson Classic
Riley Wallace Classic
Jim Phelan Classic

The winners of each Classic received a trophy and advanced to the second round or to the quarterfinals if they received a second round bye.

== Schedule ==
- Wofford, Northern Colorado, Portland State, and Sam Houston State received first round byes.
- Liberty, UTSA, Austin Peay, and UIC received second round byes.

| Date | Time* | Matchup | Score | Attendance | Television |
First round
| March 12 | 12:00 pm | **Central Michigan** at Fort Wayne (Hugh Durham Classic) | 94–89 | 1,234 | CBSSN |
| March 12 | 2:00 pm | Abilene Christian at **Drake** (Lou Henson Classic) | 73–80 ^{OT} | 3,565 | CBSSN |
| March 12 | 6:00 pm | North Carolina A&T at **Liberty** (Jim Phelan Classic) | 52–65 | 486 | CBSSN |
| March 12 | 10:00 pm | Hartford at **San Diego** (Riley Wallace Classic) | 72–88 | 893 | CBSSN |
| March 14 | 7:00 pm | Niagara at **Eastern Michigan** | 65–83 | 1,138 | CBS Sports Live watchcit.com |
| March 14 | 8:00 pm | Saint Francis (PA) at **UIC** | 61–84 | 1,137 | CBS Sports Live watchcit.com |
| March 14 | 8:00 pm | Lamar at **UTSA** | 69–76 | 1,012 | CBS Sports Live watchcit.com |
| March 15 | 8:00 pm | Louisiana–Monroe at **Austin Peay** (Coach John McLendon Classic) | 66–80 | 1,228 | CBS Sports Live watchcit.com |
Second round
| March 16 | 7:00 pm | **Central Michigan** at Wofford | 98–94 | 1,448 | CBS Sports Live watchcit.com |
| March 17 | 10:00 pm | Portland State at **San Diego** | 64–67 | 1,019 | CBS Sports Live watchcit.com |
| March 18 | 5:00 pm | Drake at **Northern Colorado** | 72–81 | 1,074 | CBS Sports Live watchcit.com |
| March 19 | 7:30 pm | Eastern Michigan at **Sam Houston State** | 62–69 | 322 | CBS Sports Live watchcit.com |
Quarterfinals
| March 21 | 8:00 pm | **UIC** at Austin Peay | 83–81 | 1,121 | CBS Sports Live watchcit.com |
| March 21 | 10:00 pm | **Northern Colorado** at San Diego | 86–75 | 1,053 | CBS Sports Live watchcit.com |
| March 22 | 8:00 pm | **Sam Houston State** at UTSA | 76–69 | 1,352 | CBS Sports Live watchcit.com |
| March 24 | 2:00 pm | Central Michigan at **Liberty** | 71–84 | 476 | CBS Sports Live watchcit.com |
Semifinals
| March 28 | 7:00 pm | **UIC** at Liberty | 67–51 | 2,248 | CBSSN |
| March 28 | 9:00 pm | Sam Houston State at **Northern Colorado** | 80–99 | 2,019 | CBSSN |
Championship
| March 30 | 7:00 pm | UIC at **Northern Colorado** | 71–76 | 3,198 | CBSSN |
*All times are listed as Eastern Daylight Time (UTC-4). Winning team in **bold**.

== Bracket ==
Bracket is for visual purposes only. The CIT does not use a set bracket.

First round March 12–15
Saint Francis (PA) | 61
UIC | 84
Louisiana–Monroe | 66
Austin Peay | 88
Central Michigan | 94
Fort Wayne | 89
North Carolina A&T | 52
Liberty | 65
Niagara | 65
Eastern Michigan | 83
Lamar | 69
UTSA | 76
Abilene Christian | 73
Drake | 80*
Hartford | 72
San Diego | 88

Second round March 16–19
Bye
UIC
Bye
Austin Peay
Central Michigan | 98
Wofford | 94
Bye
Liberty
Eastern Michigan | 62
Sam Houston State | 69
Bye
UTSA
Drake | 72
Northern Colorado | 81
Portland State | 64
San Diego | 67

Quarterfinals; March 21–24
UIC | 83
Austin Peay | 81
Central Michigan | 71
Liberty | 84
Sam Houston State | 76
UTSA | 69
Northern Colorado | 86
San Diego | 75

Semifinals; March 28
UIC | 67
Liberty | 51
Sam Houston State | 80
Northern Colorado | 99

Championship; March 30
UIC | 71
Northern Colorado | 76

Home teams listed second.
* Denotes overtime period.
