= 2020–21 Idaho State Bengals men's basketball team =

American college basketball season

2020–21 Idaho State Bengals men's basketball
- Conference: Big Sky Conference
- Record: 13–11 (8–6 Big Sky)
- Head coach: Ryan Looney (2nd season)
- Assistant coaches: Joe White; Chris McMillian; Davis Furman
- Home arena: Reed Gym

2020–21 Big Sky men's basketball standings
	Conf.				Overall
Team	W		L	PCT	W		L	PCT
Southern Utah	12	–	2	.857	20	–	4	.833
Weber State	12	–	3	.800	17	–	6	.739
Eastern Washington†	12	–	3	.800	16	–	8	.667
Montana State	8	–	6	.571	13	–	10	.565
Idaho State	8	–	6	.571	13	–	11	.542
Montana	7	–	9	.438	15	–	13	.536
Northern Colorado	6	–	8	.429	11	–	11	.500
Portland State	6	–	8	.429	9	–	13	.409
Sacramento State	5	–	9	.357	8	–	12	.400
Northern Arizona	4	–	10	.286	6	–	16	.273
Idaho	1	–	17	.056	1	–	21	.045
† Conference tournament winner

The 2020–21 Idaho State Bengals men's basketball team represented Idaho State University in the 2020–21 NCAA Division I men's basketball season. The Bengals, led by second-year head coach Ryan Looney, played their home games at Reed Gym in Pocatello, Idaho as members of the Big Sky Conference. They finished the season 13–11, 8–6 in Big Sky play, to finish a tie for fourth place. They lost in the quarterfinals of the Big Sky tournament to Montana State.

== Previous season ==
The Bengals finished the 2019–20 season 8–22, 4–16 Big Sky play, to finish in a tie for tenth place. As the #11 seed in the Big Sky tournament, the Bengals upset the #6 seed Northern Arizona in the first round. They were scheduled to take on the #3 seed Montana in the quarterfinals, but due to the ongoing coronavirus pandemic, all postseason tournaments were canceled, including the remainder of the Big Sky tournament.

== Roster ==
2020–21 Idaho State Bengals men's basketball team
Players
Coaches

Pos.	#	Name	Height	Weight	Year	Previous school	Hometown
G	1	Liam Sorensen	6 ft 4 in (1.93 m)	205 lb (93 kg)	Fr	Get Better Academy	Haldum, Denmark
G	2	Tarik Cool	6 ft 4 in (1.93 m)	180 lb (82 kg)	Sr	Lane Community College	Chandler, AZ
F	3	Malik Porter	6 ft 5 in (1.96 m)	215 lb (98 kg)	Sr	College of Southern Idaho	Phoenix, AZ
G	4	Emmit III Taylor	6 ft 4 in (1.93 m)	195 lb (88 kg)	Jr	North Idaho College	Lapwai, ID
G	5	Austin Smellie	6 ft 5 in (1.96 m)	195 lb (88 kg)	Jr	Preston High School	Preston, ID
G	10	Tommy Ball	6 ft 1 in (1.85 m)	175 lb (79 kg)	Fr	Oak Ridge High School	El Dorado Hills, CA
F	12	James Carlson	6 ft 9 in (2.06 m)	220 lb (100 kg)	Jr	North Idaho College	Coeur d'Alene, ID
F	13	Daxton Carr	6 ft 7 in (2.01 m)	215 lb (98 kg)	So	Cal Poly	Pocatello, ID
F	14	Kyle Karstetter	6 ft 7 in (2.01 m)	210 lb (95 kg)	Fr	Moses Lake High School	Moses Lake, WA
G	20	Robert III Ford	6 ft 0 in (1.83 m)	180 lb (82 kg)	Jr	Clackamas Community College	Portland, OR
G	22	Austin Cook	6 ft 4 in (1.93 m)	210 lb (95 kg)	Fr	Damien High School	Montclair, CA
C	24	Conner Turner	7 ft 1 in (2.16 m)	225 lb (102 kg)	Fr	West Valley High School	Yakima, WA
C	25	Brayden Parker	6 ft 8 in (2.03 m)	250 lb (113 kg)	So	College of Southern Idaho	Preston, ID
C	32	Zach Visentin	6 ft 9 in (2.06 m)	260 lb (118 kg)	Fr	Springville High School	Springville, UT
G	33	Noble Cooper	6 ft 6 in (1.98 m)	205 lb (93 kg)	Jr	North Dakota State College of Science	Woodinville, WA
F	34	Gedeon Buzangu	6 ft 8 in (2.03 m)	235 lb (107 kg)	Jr	Miles Community College	Kinshasa, DR Congo

Head coach

- Ryan Looney (Eastern Oregon)

Assistant coach(es)

- Joe White (Southern Oregon)
- Chris McMillian (Wyoming)
- Davis Furman (Idaho State)

Legend

- (C) Team captain
- (S) Suspended
- (I) Ineligible
- (W) Walk-on
- Injured
- Current redshirt

Roster
Last update: December 13, 2020

== Schedule and results ==
Date time, TV	Rank^{#}	Opponent^{#}	Result	Record	Site (attendance) city, state
Regular season
November 25, 2020*; 5:00 p.m.		at Santa Clara; Bronco Invitational	L 49–62	0–1	Leavey Center; Santa Clara, CA
November 27, 2020*; 5:00 p.m.		vs. Nicholls; Bronco Invitational	L 51–70	0–2	Leavey Center; Santa Clara, CA
November 28, 2020*; 2:00 p.m.		vs. UC Davis; Bronco Invitational	L 61–70	0–3	Leavey Center; Santa Clara, CA
December 5, 2020*; 7:00 p.m.		Montana Western	Cancelled due to COVID-19 issues		Reed Gym; Pocatello, ID
December 8, 2020*; 4:00 p.m., P12N		at Utah	L 59–75	0–4	Jon M. Huntsman Center; Salt Lake City, UT
December 12, 2020*; 12:00 p.m., Pluto TV		Bethesda	W 87–48	1–4	Reed Gym; Pocatello, ID
December 15, 2020*; 7:00 p.m.		Eastern Oregon	Cancelled due to COVID-19 issues		Reed Gym; Pocatello, ID
December 17, 2020*; 7:00 p.m., Pluto TV		SAGU American Indian College	W 89–54	2–4	Reed Gym; Pocatello, ID
December 18, 2020*; 7:00 p.m., Pluto TV		SAGU American Indian College	W 113–46	3–4	Reed Gym; Pocatello, ID
December 19, 2020*; 2:00 p.m.		at Utah Valley	Cancelled due to COVID-19 issues		UCCU Center; Orem, UT
December 22, 2020; 2:00 p.m., Pluto TV		at Northern Colorado	L 64–69	3–5 (0–1)	Bank of Colorado Arena; Greeley, CO
December 23, 2020; 2:00 p.m., Pluto TV		at Northern Colorado	W 71–56	4–5 (1–1)	Bank of Colorado Arena; Greeley, CO
December 31, 2020; 7:00 p.m., Pluto TV		Weber State	Cancelled due to COVID-19 issues		Reed Gym; Pocatello, ID
January 2, 2021; 7:00 p.m., Pluto TV		at Weber State	Cancelled due to COVID-19 issues		Dee Events Center; Ogden, UT
January 7, 2021; 6:00 p.m., Pluto TV		at Northern Arizona	W 73–69	5–5 (2–1)	Rolle Activity Center; Flagstaff, AZ
January 9, 2021; 12:00 p.m., Pluto TV		at Northern Arizona	W 76–70	6–5 (3–1)	Rolle Activity Center; Flagstaff, AZ
January 17, 2021; 2:00 p.m., Pluto TV		Sacramento State	W 57–56 ^{OT}	7–5 (4–1)	Reed Gym; Pocatello, ID
January 18, 2021; 1:00 p.m., Pluto TV		Sacramento State	L 65–70	7–6 (4–2)	Reed Gym; Pocatello, ID
January 21, 2021; 8:00 p.m., Pluto TV		at Portland State	W 64–57	8–6 (5–2)	Viking Pavilion; Portland, OR
January 23, 2021; 1:00 p.m., Pluto TV		at Portland State	L 43–69	8–7 (5–3)	Viking Pavilion; Portland, OR
January 28, 2021; 7:00 p.m., Pluto TV		Southern Utah	Cancelled due to COVID-19 issues		Reed Gym; Pocatello, ID
January 30, 2021; 12:00 p.m., Pluto TV		Southern Utah	Cancelled due to COVID-19 issues		Reed Gym; Pocatello, ID
January 30, 2021*; 4:00 p.m., Pluto TV		Northwest	W 89–48	9–7	Reed Gym; Pocatello, ID
February 5, 2021*; 1:00 p.m., Pluto TV		Eastern Oregon	Canceled		Reed Gym; Pocatello, ID
February 6, 2021*; 11:00 a.m., Pluto TV		Eastern Oregon	Canceled		Reed Gym; Pocatello, ID
February 11, 2021; 7:00 p.m., Pluto TV		Idaho; Battle of the Domes	W 69–43	10–7 (6–3)	Reed Gym; Pocatello, ID
February 13, 2021; 12:00 p.m., Pluto TV		Idaho; Battle of the Domes	W 64–58 ^{OT}	11–7 (7–3)	Reed Gym; Pocatello, ID
February 15, 2021*; 2:00 p.m., Pluto TV		George Fox	W 84–59	12–7	Reed Gym; Pocatello, ID
February 18, 2021; 7:00 p.m., Pluto TV		at Montana State	Canceled		Brick Breeden Fieldhouse; Bozeman, MT
February 20, 2021; 7:00 p.m., Pluto TV		Montana State	Canceled		Reed Gym; Pocatello, ID
February 25, 2021; 7:00 p.m., Pluto TV		Montana	L 58–64	12–8 (7–4)	Reed Gym (40); Pocatello, ID
February 27, 2021; 12:00 p.m., Pluto TV		Montana	L 58–59	12–9 (7–5)	Reed Gym (50); Pocatello, ID
March 4, 2021; 7:00 p.m., Pluto TV		at Eastern Washington	W 68–63	13–9 (8–5)	Reese Court (0); Cheney, WA
March 6, 2021; 1:00 p.m., Pluto TV		at Eastern Washington	L 62–75	13–10 (8–6)	Reese Court (0); Cheney, WA
Big Sky tournament
March 11, 2021; 2:30 p.m., Pluto TV 1050	(4)	vs. (5) Montana State; Quarterfinals	L 63–71	13–11	Idaho Central Arena; Boise, ID
*Non-conference game. ^{#}Rankings from AP poll. (#) Tournament seedings in parentheses. All times are in Mountain.
