= 2020–21 Sacramento State Hornets men's basketball team =

American college basketball season

2020–21 Sacramento State Hornets men's basketball
- Conference: Big Sky Conference
- Record: 8–12 (5–9 Big Sky)
- Head coach: Brian Katz (13th season)
- Associate head coach: Brandon Laird
- Assistant coaches: Chris Walker; Nate Smith
- Home arena: Hornets Nest (Capacity: 1,012)

2020–21 Big Sky men's basketball standings
	Conf.				Overall
Team	W		L	PCT	W		L	PCT
Southern Utah	12	–	2	.857	20	–	4	.833
Weber State	12	–	3	.800	17	–	6	.739
Eastern Washington†	12	–	3	.800	16	–	8	.667
Montana State	8	–	6	.571	13	–	10	.565
Idaho State	8	–	6	.571	13	–	11	.542
Montana	7	–	9	.438	15	–	13	.536
Northern Colorado	6	–	8	.429	11	–	11	.500
Portland State	6	–	8	.429	9	–	13	.409
Sacramento State	5	–	9	.357	8	–	12	.400
Northern Arizona	4	–	10	.286	6	–	16	.273
Idaho	1	–	17	.056	1	–	21	.045
† Conference tournament winner

The 2020–21 Sacramento State Hornets men's basketball team represented California State University, Sacramento in the 2020–21 NCAA Division I men's basketball season. The Hornets, led by 13th-year head coach Brian Katz played their home games at the Hornets Nest in Sacramento, California as members of the Big Sky Conference. They finished the season 8-12, 5-9 in Big Sky Play to finish in 9th place. They lost in the first round of the Big Sky tournament to Northern Colorado.

== Previous season ==
The Hornets finished the 2019–20 season 16–14, 8–12 in Big Sky play to finish in a tie for seventh place. They received the #9 seed in the Big Sky tournament, and went up against the #8 seed Weber State in the first round, winning 64–52. They were scheduled to face off against top seed Eastern Washington in the quarterfinals, but the remainder of the tournament was cancelled due to the ongoing COVID-19 pandemic.

== Roster ==
2020–21 Sacramento State Hornets men's basketball team
Players
Coaches

Pos.	#	Name	Height	Weight	Year	Previous school	Hometown
F	0	Samaad Hector	6 ft 6 in (1.98 m)	230 lb (104 kg)	Jr	Lower Columbia College	Vancouver, Washington
G	1	Teiano Hardee	6 ft 5 in (1.96 m)	215 lb (98 kg)	Fr	Vanden High School	Fairfield, California
G	3	Rick Barros III	6 ft 5 in (1.96 m)	200 lb (91 kg)	RS Fr	Nation Wide Academy	Sacramento, California
G	4	Zach Chappell	6 ft 3 in (1.91 m)	190 lb (86 kg)	Jr	San Jose State	Sacramento, California
G	11	Brandon Davis	6 ft 2 in (1.88 m)	190 lb (86 kg)	RS Jr	UC Santa Barbara	Orlando, Florida
G	12	Deshaun Highler	6 ft 2 in (1.88 m)	180 lb (82 kg)	Jr	East Los Angeles College	Riverside, California
F	13	Jordan Cooke-Harper	6 ft 9 in (2.06 m)	220 lb (100 kg)	Jr	Southwestern College	San Diego, California
G	14	William FitzPatrick	6 ft 3 in (1.91 m)	200 lb (91 kg)	Sr	Folsom Lake College	Folsom, California
G	15	Elijah McCullough	6 ft 3 in (1.91 m)	180 lb (82 kg)	RS So	Damien High School	Chino Hills, California
G	20	Noah Zoppi	6 ft 3 in (1.91 m)	200 lb (91 kg)	Jr	Butte College	Corning, California
F	22	Ethan Esposito	6 ft 7 in (2.01 m)	225 lb (102 kg)	Sr	San Diego City College	Naples, Italy
G/F	23	Bryce Fowler	6 ft 6 in (1.98 m)	215 lb (98 kg)	Sr	Agua Fria High School	Avondale, Arizona
F	32	Jalen Townsell	6 ft 7 in (2.01 m)	215 lb (98 kg)	So	Arizona Western College	Sparks, Nevada
F	33	David Jones	6 ft 8 in (2.03 m)	195 lb (88 kg)	Fr	Woodstock Academy	Sacramento, California
F	34	Spencer Monteiro	6 ft 6 in (1.98 m)	195 lb (88 kg)	Sr	San Joaquin Delta College	Woodbridge, California
G	35	Christian Terrell	6 ft 5 in (1.96 m)	200 lb (91 kg)	RS Sr	UC Santa Barbara	Sacramento, California

Head coach

- Brian Katz (Sacramento State)

Assistant coach(es)

- Brandon Laird (UC Davis)
- Chris Walker (Oklahoma)
- Nate Smith (Sacramento State)

Legend

- (C) Team captain
- (S) Suspended
- (I) Ineligible
- (W) Walk-on
- Injured
- Current redshirt

Roster
Last update: November 29, 2020

== Schedule and results ==
Date time, TV	Rank^{#}	Opponent^{#}	Result	Record	Site (attendance) city, state
Regular season
November 25, 2020*; 7:05 pm		Bethesda	W 101–57	1–0	Hornets Nest; Sacramento, CA
December 3, 2020; 5:05 pm		Idaho	W 77–55	2–0 (1–0)	Hornets Nest; Sacramento, CA
December 5, 2020; 10:35 am		Idaho	W 73–57	3–0 (2–0)	Hornets Nest; Sacramento, CA
December 12, 2020*		vs. Santa Clara	Canceled due to positive COVID-19 tests		Kaiser Permanente Arena; Santa Cruz, CA
December 19, 2020*; 12:05 pm		UC Davis	Canceled due to positive COVID-19 tests		Hornets Nest; Sacramento, CA
December 21, 2020*; 6:05 pm		at Stanford	Canceled due to positive COVID-19 tests		Maples Pavilion; Stanford, CA
December 30, 2020*; 7:00 pm		at Saint Mary's	L 45–63	3–1	University Credit Union Pavilion; Moraga, CA
January 7, 2021; 3:05 pm		Portland State	Canceled due to positive COVID-19 tests		Hornets Nest; Sacramento, CA
January 9, 2021; 12:05 pm		at Portland State	Canceled due to positive COVID-19 tests		Viking Pavilion; Portland, OR
January 17, 2021; 1:00 pm		at Idaho State	L 56–57 ^{OT}	4–2 (2–1)	Reed Gym; Pocatello, ID
January 18, 2021; 12:00 pm		at Idaho State	W 70–65	5–2 (3–1)	Reed Gym; Pocatello, ID
January 21, 2021; 5:05 pm		Montana	L 66–78	5–3 (3–2)	Hornets Nest; Sacramento, CA
January 23, 2021; 11:05 am		Montana	W 89–83 ^{2OT}	6–3 (4–2)	Hornets Nest; Sacramento, CA
January 31, 2021; 11:05 am		at Eastern Washington	L 60–68	6–4 (4–3)	Reese Court; Cheney, WA
February 1, 2021; 11:05 am		at Eastern Washington	L 79–94	6–5 (4–4)	Reese Court; Cheney, WA
February 4, 2021; 5:05 pm		Northern Arizona	Canceled		Hornets Nest; Sacramento, CA
February 6, 2021; 11:05 am		Northern Arizona	Canceled		Hornets Nest; Sacramento, CA
February 11, 2021		at Northern Colorado	Canceled		Bank of Colorado Arena; Greeley, CO
February 13, 2021; 11:05 am		Northern Colorado	Canceled		Hornets Nest; Sacramento, CA
February 14, 2021*; 12:00 pm		California Baptist	W 70–69	7–6	Hornets Nest; Sacramento, CA
February 18, 2021; 6:05 pm		at Southern Utah	L 69–88	7–7 (4–5)	America First Event Center; Cedar City, UT
February 20, 2021; 11:05 am		at Southern Utah	L 57–77	7–8 (4–6)	America First Event Center; Cedar City, UT
February 25, 2021; 5:05 pm		Weber State	L 73-82	7-9 (4-7)	Hornets Nest; Sacramento, CA
February 27, 2021; 11:05 am		Weber State	L 70-72	7-10 (4-8)	Hornets Nest; Sacramento, CA
March 4, 2021; 6:05 pm		at Montana State	L 75-77	7-11 (4-9)	Brick Breeden Fieldhouse; Bozeman, MT
March 6, 2021; 11:05 am		at Montana State	W 74-73	8-11 (5-9)	Brick Breeden Fieldhouse; Bozeman, MT
Big Sky tournament
March 10, 2021; 9:30am, Pluto TV	(9)	vs. (8) Northern Colorado	L 83-90	8-12	Idaho Central Arena; Boise, ID
*Non-conference game. ^{#}Rankings from AP Poll. (#) Tournament seedings in parentheses. All times are in Pacific.
