= List of Idaho Vandals men's basketball head coaches =

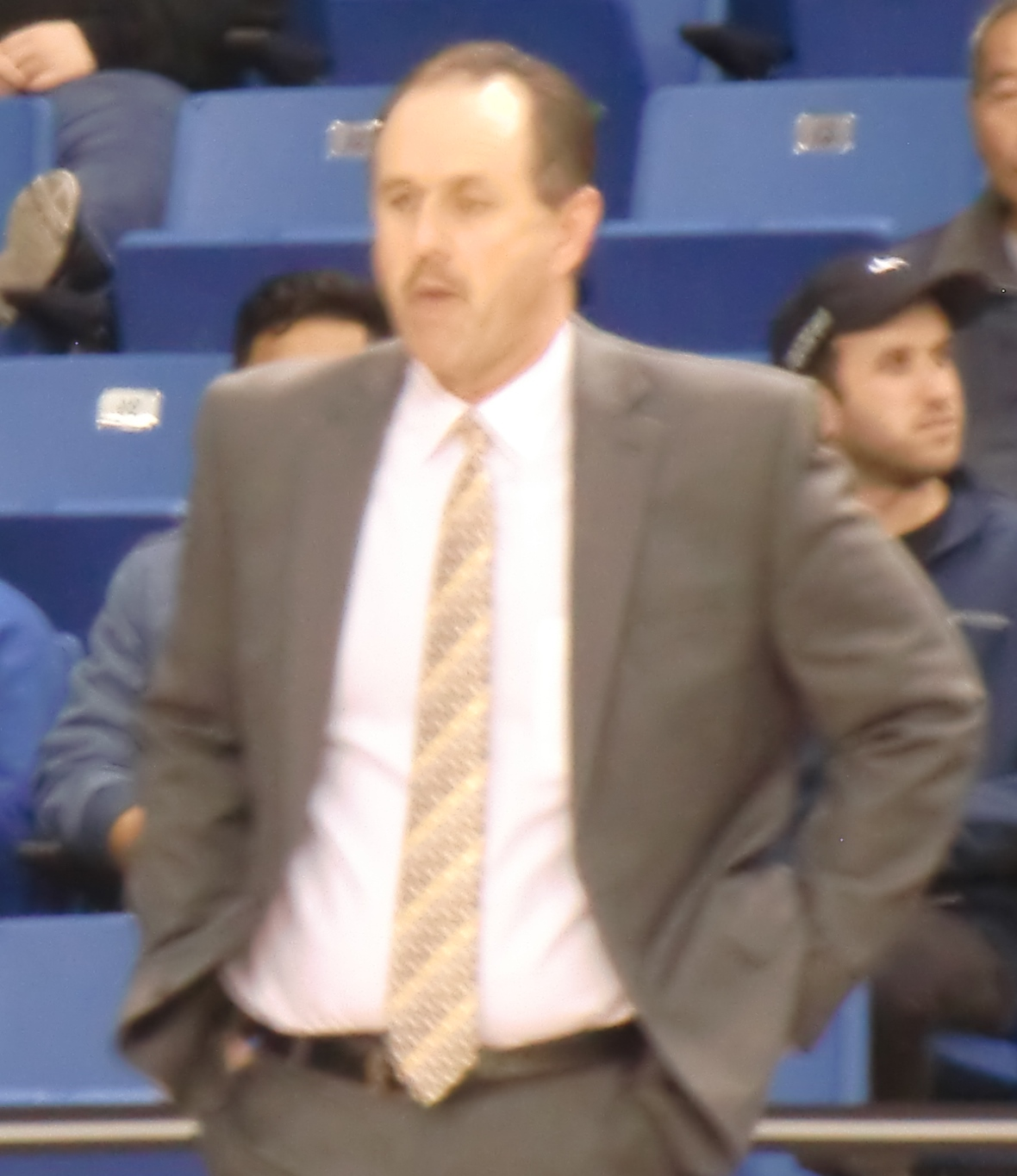
Don Verlin, the winningest head coach in Vandals men's basketball history.

The following is a list of Idaho Vandals men's basketball head coaches. There have been 32 head coaches of the Vandals in their 118-season history.

Idaho's current head coach is Alex Pribble. He was hired as the Vandals' head coach in March 2023, replacing Zac Claus, who was fired before the start of the 2023 Big Sky tournament.

| No. | Tenure | Coach | Years | Record | Pct. |
|---|---|---|---|---|---|
| 1 | 1905–1907; 1910–1915 | John G. Griffith | 7 | 34–50 | .405 |
| 2 | 1907–1908 | George Wyman | 1 | 4–4 | .500 |
| 3 | 1908–1910 | John S. Grogan | 2 | 15–19 | .441 |
| 4 | 1915–1916 | Charles M. Rademacher | 1 | 1–12 | .077 |
| 5 | 1916–1918 | Hec Edmundson | 2 | 20–9 | .690 |
| 6 | 1918–1919 | Wilfred C. Bleamaster | 1 | 13–2 | .867 |
| 7 | 1919–1920 | Ralph Hutchinson | 1 | 14–3 | .824 |
| 8 | 1920–1927 | Dave MacMillan | 7 | 102–37 | .734 |
| 9 | 1927–1936 | Richard Fox | 9 | 88–124 | .415 |
| 10 | 1936–1941 | Forrest Twogood | 5 | 69–79 | .466 |
| 11 | 1941–1942; 1946–1947 | Guy Wicks | 2 | 16–40 | .286 |
| 12 | 1942–1946 | James A. Brown | 4 | 57–67 | .460 |
| 13 | 1947–1954 | Charles Finley | 7 | 107–96 | .527 |
| 14 | 1954–1959 | Harlan Hodges | 5 | 52–77 | .403 |
| 15 | 1959–1960 | Dave Strack | 1 | 11–15 | .423 |
| 16 | 1960–1963 | Joe Cipriano | 3 | 43–35 | .551 |
| 17 | 1963–1966 | Jim Goddard | 3 | 25–52 | .325 |
| 18 | 1966–1974 | Wayne Anderson | 8 | 88–117 | .429 |
| 19 | 1974–1978 | Jim Jarvis | 4 | 26–78 | .250 |
| 20 | 1978–1983 | Don Monson | 5 | 100–41 | .709 |
| 21 | 1983–1986 | Bill Trumbo | 3 | 28–59 | .322 |
| 22 | 1986–1988 | Tim Floyd | 2 | 35–25 | .583 |
| 23 | 1988–1990; 1996–1997 | Kermit Davis | 3 | 63–29 | .685 |
| 24 | 1990–1993 | Larry Eustachy | 3 | 61–33 | .649 |
| 25 | 1993–1996 | Joe Cravens | 3 | 42–41 | .506 |
| 26 | 1997–2001 | David Farrar | 4 | 49–61 | .445 |
| 27 | 2001–2006 | Leonard Perry | 5 | 48–97 | .331 |
| 28 | 2006–2008 | George Pfeifer | 2 | 12–48 | .200 |
| 29 | 2008–2019 | Don Verlin | 11 | 177–176 | .501 |
| 30 | 2019–2023 (Note: Claus was fired in February 2023. Tim Marrion was named interim coach for the remainder of the 2022–23 season.) | Zac Claus | 4 | 28–88 | .241 |
| 31 | 2023* | Tim Marrion (interim) | 0 | 0–1 | .000 |
| 31 | 2023–present | Alex Pribble | 3 | 60–54 | .526 |
| Totals | | 32 coaches | 118 seasons | 1,428–1,615 | .469 |
Records updated through end of 2022–23 season * - Denotes interim head coach. Source
