= 2020–21 Big Sky Conference men's basketball season =

- League: NCAA Division I
- Sport: Basketball
- Teams: 11

Regular season

Tournament

Big Sky men's basketball seasons

2020–21 Big Sky men's basketball standings
	Conf.				Overall
Team	W		L	PCT	W		L	PCT
Southern Utah	12	–	2	.857	20	–	4	.833
Weber State	12	–	3	.800	17	–	6	.739
Eastern Washington†	12	–	3	.800	16	–	8	.667
Montana State	8	–	6	.571	13	–	10	.565
Idaho State	8	–	6	.571	13	–	11	.542
Montana	7	–	9	.438	15	–	13	.536
Northern Colorado	6	–	8	.429	11	–	11	.500
Portland State	6	–	8	.429	9	–	13	.409
Sacramento State	5	–	9	.357	8	–	12	.400
Northern Arizona	4	–	10	.286	6	–	16	.273
Idaho	1	–	17	.056	1	–	21	.045
† Conference tournament winner

The 2020–21 Big Sky Conference men's basketball season began with practices in October 2020, followed by the start of the 2020–21 NCAA Division I men's basketball season in November. Conference play begins in January 2021 and will conclude in March 2021.

== Preseason Awards ==
Preseason awards were announced by the league office on November 11, 2020.

=== Preseason men's basketball coaches poll ===
(First place votes in parentheses)

1. Eastern Washington (9) 99
2. Montana (1) 86
3. Weber State 73
4. Portland State (1) 67
5. Northern Colorado 65
6. Montana State 60
7. Southern Utah 56
8. Northern Arizona 34
9. Sacramento State 31
10. Idaho State 24
11. Idaho 10

=== Preseason men's basketball media poll ===
(First place votes in parentheses)

1. Eastern Washington (24) 304
2. Montana (2) 250
3. Northern Colorado (2) 222
4. Montana State 200
5. Weber State 183
6. Southern Utah 173
7. Portland State 147
8. Northern Arizona 143
9. Sacramento State 93
10. Idaho State 86
11. Idaho 50

=== Honors ===
- Preseason Player of the Year: Jacob Davison, Eastern Washington

== Conference matrix ==
	Eastern Washington	Idaho	Idaho State	Montana	Montana State	Northern Arizona	Northern Colorado	Portland State	Sacramento State	Southern Utah	Weber State
vs. Eastern Washington	0–0	0−2	1−1	0−2	0−2	0−1	1−1	0−0	0−2	1–1	0–0
vs. Idaho	2–0	–	2−0	0−0	1−1	2−0	2−0	2−0	2−0	2–0	2–0
vs. Idaho State	1–1	0−2	–	2–0	0−0	0−2	1−1	1−1	1−1	0–0	0–0
vs. Montana	2–0	0−0	0−2	–	0−0	1−1	1−1	1−1	1−1	2–0	1–1
vs. Montana State	2–0	1−1	0−0	0−0	–	0−2	0−2	0−2	1−1	0–0	2–0
vs. Northern Arizona	1–0	0−2	2−0	1−1	2−0	–	0−1	0−0	0−0	2–0	2–0
vs. Northern Colorado	1–1	0−2	1−1	1−1	2−0	1−0	–	1−1	0−0	0–0	1–0
vs. Portland State	0–0	0−2	1−1	1−1	2−0	0−0	1−1	–	0−0	2–0	1–1
vs. Sacramento State	2–0	0−2	1−1	1−1	1−1	0−0	0−0	0−0	–	2–0	2–0
vs. Southern Utah	1–1	0−2	0−0	0−2	0−0	0−2	0−0	0−2	0−2	–	1–1
vs. Weber State	0–0	0−2	0−0	1−1	0−2	0−2	0−1	1−1	0−2	1–1	−
Total	12–3	1–17	8–6	7–9	8–6	4–10	6–8	6–8	5–9	12–2	12–3

== All-Big Sky awards ==
=== Big Sky men's basketball weekly awards ===
Week	Player(s) of the Week	School
Nov 30	Xavier Bishop	Montana State
Dec 7	Maizen Fausett	Southern Utah
Dec 14	Tevian Jones	Southern Utah (2)
Dec 21	Tanner Groves	Eastern Washington
Dec 28	Brayden Parker	Idaho State
Jan 4	Cameron Shelton	Northern Arizona
Jan 11	Xavier Bishop	Montana State (2)
Jan 18	Jubrile Belo	Montana State (3)
Jan 25	Ethan Esposito	Sacramento State
Feb 1	Tanner Groves (2)	Eastern Washington (2)
Feb 8	Seikou Sisoho Jawara	Weber State
Feb 15	Kim Aiken Jr.	Eastern Washington (3)
Feb 22	Kim Aiken Jr. (2)	Eastern Washington (4)
Mar 1	Dre Marin	Southern Utah (3)
