= 2020–21 Northern Colorado Bears men's basketball team =

American college basketball season

2020–21 Northern Colorado Bears men's basketball
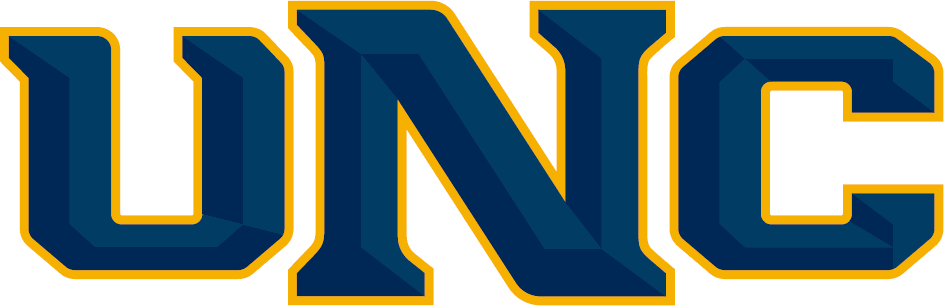
- Conference: Big Sky Conference
- Record: 11–11 (6–8 Big Sky)
- Head coach: Steve Smiley (1st season)
- Assistant coaches: Cory Fehringer; Dorian Green; Houston Reed
- Home arena: Bank of Colorado Arena

2020–21 Big Sky men's basketball standings
	Conf.				Overall
Team	W		L	PCT	W		L	PCT
Southern Utah	12	–	2	.857	20	–	4	.833
Weber State	12	–	3	.800	17	–	6	.739
Eastern Washington†	12	–	3	.800	16	–	8	.667
Montana State	8	–	6	.571	13	–	10	.565
Idaho State	8	–	6	.571	13	–	11	.542
Montana	7	–	9	.438	15	–	13	.536
Northern Colorado	6	–	8	.429	11	–	11	.500
Portland State	6	–	8	.429	9	–	13	.409
Sacramento State	5	–	9	.357	8	–	12	.400
Northern Arizona	4	–	10	.286	6	–	16	.273
Idaho	1	–	17	.056	1	–	21	.045
† Conference tournament winner

The 2020–21 Northern Colorado Bears men's basketball team represented the University of Northern Colorado in the 2020–21 NCAA Division I men's basketball season. The Bears, led by first-year head coach Steve Smiley, played their home games at Bank of Colorado Arena in Greeley, Colorado as members of the Big Sky Conference. They finished the season 11-11, 6-8 in Big Sky Play to finish a tie for 7th place. They defeated Sacramento State in the first round before losing in the quarterfinals to Southern Utah.

== Previous season ==
The Bears finished the 2019–20 season 22–9, 15–5 Big Sky play to finish in second place. Due to the ongoing coronavirus pandemic, all postseason tournaments were canceled including the Big Sky tournament.

On March 17, 2020, head coach Jeff Linder was named the head coach at Wyoming. A few days later, the school promoted assistant coach Steve Smiley as the school's new head coach.

== Roster ==
2020–21 Northern Colorado Bears men's basketball team
Players
Coaches

Pos.	#	Name	Height	Weight	Year	Previous school	Hometown
G	0	Greg Bowie II	6 ft 2 in (1.88 m)	180 lb (82 kg)	RS Jr	UT Rio Grande Valley	San Antonio, Texas
G	1	Daylen Kountz	6 ft 4 in (1.93 m)	191 lb (87 kg)	Jr	Colorado	Denver, Colorado
G	2	Matt Johnson II	6 ft 2 in (1.88 m)	180 lb (82 kg)	RS Jr	Rangeview High School	Aurora, Colorado
G	3	Tre'Shon Smoots	6 ft 1 in (1.85 m)	175 lb (79 kg)	RS So	Grant High School	Sacramento, California
G	4	Sam Masten	6 ft 2 in (1.88 m)	175 lb (79 kg)	Jr	Rock Canyon High School	Highlands Ranch, Colorado
F	10	Jamel Melvin	6 ft 9 in (2.06 m)	205 lb (93 kg)	Fr	The Potomac School	McLean, Virginia
G	11	Rodrick McCobb	6 ft 5 in (1.96 m)	185 lb (84 kg)	Sr	Fullerton College	Ontario, California
G	12	Connor Creech	6 ft 5 in (1.96 m)	185 lb (84 kg)	Fr	Hastings High School	Hastings, Nebraska
G	13	Bodie Hume	6 ft 6 in (1.98 m)	190 lb (86 kg)	Jr	Sterling High School (CO)	Sterling, Colorado
F	15	Kur Jockuch	6 ft 9 in (2.06 m)	220 lb (100 kg)	Jr	London Basketball Academy	Ontario, Canada
G	20	Malcolm Little	6 ft 3 in (1.91 m)	165 lb (75 kg)	RS Fr	Balboa School	San Diego, California
F	21	Bryce Kennedy	6 ft 7 in (2.01 m)	205 lb (93 kg)	Fr	Allen High School	Allen, Texas
G/F	24	Marque English II	6 ft 6 in (1.98 m)	205 lb (93 kg)	So	Butler Community College	Pittsburg, Kansas
G	25	Jalen Page	6 ft 5 in (1.96 m)	190 lb (86 kg)	Fr	Fairview High School	Boulder, Colorado
C	32	Theo Hughes	7 ft 0 in (2.13 m)	260 lb (118 kg)	Fr	Barking Abbey School	Brentwood, England
F	43	Roy Grigsby	6 ft 9 in (2.06 m)	200 lb (91 kg)	RS So	Monarch High School	Superior, Colorado

Head coach

- Steve Smiley (Northern State)`

Assistant coach(es)

- Cory Fehringer (Hastings College)
- Dorian Green (Colorado State)
- Houston Reed (Northern State)

Legend

- (C) Team captain
- (S) Suspended
- (I) Ineligible
- (W) Walk-on
- Injured
- Current redshirt

Roster
Last update: December 11, 2020

== Schedule and results ==
Date time, TV	Rank^{#}	Opponent^{#}	Result	Record	Site (attendance) city, state
Regular season
November 27, 2020*		vs. Southeast Missouri State; Negro Leagues Baseball Museum Tipoff Classic Semifinal	Canceled		Mabee Fieldhouse; Kansas City, MO
November 28, 2020*		vs. Kansas City / Avila; Negro Leagues Baseball Museum Tipoff Classic Final	Canceled		Mabee Fieldhouse; Kansas City, MO
December 5, 2020*		at Arizona	Canceled		McKale Center; Tucson, AZ
December 9, 2020*; 6:30 pm, Pluto TV		Colorado Christian	W 87–62	1–0	Bank of Colorado Arena; Greeley, CO
December 11, 2020*; 6:30 pm, Pluto TV		Regis	W 83–58	2–0	Bank of Colorado Arena; Greeley, CO
December 14, 2020*; 7:00 pm, P12N		at Colorado	L 45–81	2–1	CU Events Center (26); Boulder, CO
December 16, 2020*; 6:00 pm		at Denver	W 83–75	3–1	Hamilton Gymnasium; Denver, CO
December 18, 2020*; 7:00 pm		at Utah State	L 50–63	3–2	Smith Spectrum (1,376); Logan, UT
December 22, 2020; 2:00 pm, Pluto TV		Idaho State	W 69–64	4–2 (1–0)	Bank of Colorado Arena; Greeley, CO
December 23, 2020; 2:00 pm, Pluto TV		Idaho State	L 56–71	4–3 (1–1)	Bank of Colorado Arena; Greeley, CO
January 2, 2021; 5:00 pm, Pluto TV		at Montana	W 64–62	5–3 (2–1)	Dahlberg Arena; Missoula, MT
January 4, 2021; 9:00 am, Pluto TV		at Montana	L 54–56	5–4 (2–2)	Dahlberg Arena; Missoula, MT
January 7, 2021; 6:30 pm, Pluto TV		Montana State	L 67–79	5–5 (2–3)	Bank of Colorado Arena; Greeley, CO
January 9, 2021; 12:00 pm, Pluto TV		Montana State	L 74–76	5–6 (2–4)	Bank of Colorado Arena; Greeley, CO
January 14, 2021; 7:00 pm, Pluto TV		at Idaho	W 74–54	6–6 (3–4)	Cowan Spectrum; Moscow, ID
January 16, 2021; 1:00 pm, Pluto TV		at Idaho	W 75–61	7–6 (4–4)	Cowan Spectrum; Moscow, ID
January 21, 2021; 6:30 pm, Pluto TV		Eastern Washington	W 78–76	8–6 (5–4)	Bank of Colorado Arena; Greeley, CO
January 23, 2021; 12:00 pm, Pluto TV		Eastern Washington	L 76–82	8–7 (5–5)	Bank of Colorado Arena; Greeley, CO
January 29, 2021; 6:00 pm, Pluto TV		at Northern Arizona	L 64–68	8–8 (5–6)	Rolle Activity Center; Flagstaff, AZ
February 4, 2021; 7:00 pm, Pluto TV		at Southern Utah	Canceled		America First Event Center; Cedar City, UT
February 6, 2021; 12:00 pm, Pluto TV		at Southern Utah	Canceled		America First Event Center; Cedar City, UT
February 11, 2021; 6:30 pm, Pluto TV		Sacramento State	Canceled		Bank of Colorado Arena; Greeley, CO
February 13, 2021; 12:00 pm, Pluto TV		at Sacramento State	Canceled		Hornets Nest; Sacramento, CA
February 16, 2021*		at Colorado State	Canceled		Moby Arena; Fort Collins, CO
February 22, 2021*; 6:30 pm, Pluto TV		Warner Pacific	W 89–60	9–8	Bank of Colorado Arena (100); Greeley, CO
February 25, 2021; 6:30 pm, Pluto TV		Portland State	W 66–64	10–8 (6–6)	Bank of Colorado Arena (100); Greeley, CO
February 27, 2021; 12:00 pm, Pluto TV		Portland State	L 65–73	10–9 (6–7)	Bank of Colorado Arena (125); Greeley, CO
March 4, 2021; 7:00 pm, Pluto TV		at Weber State	L 59–60	10–10 (6–8)	Dee Events Center (1,093); Ogden, UT
March 6, 2021; 12:00 pm, Pluto TV		at Weber State	Canceled		Dee Events Center; Ogden, UT
Big Sky tournament
March 10, 2021; 9:00 am, Pluto TV	(8)	vs. (9) Sacramento State; First Round	W 90–83	11–10	Idaho Central Arena; Boise, ID
March 11, 2021; 12:00 pm, Pluto TV	(8)	vs. (1) Southern Utah; Quarterfinals	L 83–91	11–11	Idaho Central Arena; Boise, ID
*Non-conference game. ^{#}Rankings from AP Poll. (#) Tournament seedings in parentheses. All times are in Mountain.
