= 2020–21 Idaho Vandals men's basketball team =

American college basketball season

2020–21 Idaho Vandals men's basketball
- Conference: Big Sky Conference
- Record: 1–21 (1–17 Big Sky)
- Head coach: Zac Claus (2nd season)
- Associate head coach: Doug Novsek
- Assistant coaches: Kenny Tripp; Johnny Hill
- Home arena: ~~Cowan Spectrum~~; Memorial Gymnasium

2020–21 Big Sky men's basketball standings
	Conf.				Overall
Team	W		L	PCT	W		L	PCT
Southern Utah	12	–	2	.857	20	–	4	.833
Weber State	12	–	3	.800	17	–	6	.739
Eastern Washington†	12	–	3	.800	16	–	8	.667
Montana State	8	–	6	.571	13	–	10	.565
Idaho State	8	–	6	.571	13	–	11	.542
Montana	7	–	9	.438	15	–	13	.536
Northern Colorado	6	–	8	.429	11	–	11	.500
Portland State	6	–	8	.429	9	–	13	.409
Sacramento State	5	–	9	.357	8	–	12	.400
Northern Arizona	4	–	10	.286	6	–	16	.273
Idaho	1	–	17	.056	1	–	21	.045
† Conference tournament winner

The 2020–21 Idaho Vandals men's basketball team represented the University of Idaho in the Big Sky Conference during the 2020–21 NCAA Division I men's basketball season. Led by second-year head coach Zac Claus, the Vandals played their home games on campus at Memorial Gymnasium in Moscow, Idaho.

Due to the COVID-19 pandemic, home games were switched to venerable Memorial Gymnasium (1928). The 2020 football season in the Big Sky was delayed until early 2021; football practice started in late January in the Kibbie Dome, and the first of six games was held in late February.

This was intended to be the 46th and final season for men's basketball in the Kibbie Dome, configured as the "Cowan Spectrum" for basketball since February 2001. The university plans to open the new Idaho Central Credit Union Arena, located north of the Kibbie Dome's west end, for the 2021–22 season. They finished the season 1-21, 1-17 in Big Sky Play to finish in last place. They lost in the First Round of the Big Sky tournament to Montana.

== Previous season ==
The Vandals finished the 2019–20 season at 8–24 (4–16 in Big Sky, last). They were the tenth seed in the conference tourney and lost 69–75 in the opening round to seventh-seeded Southern Utah.

== Roster ==
2020–21 Idaho Vandals men's basketball team
Players
Coaches

Pos.	#	Name	Height	Weight	Year	Previous school	Hometown
F	0	Michael Hanshaw	6 ft 9 in (2.06 m)	224 lb (102 kg)	RS So	Westlake High School	Moorpark, California
G	1	Ja'Vary Christmas	6 ft 3 in (1.91 m)	172 lb (78 kg)	Sr	Sheridan College	Portland, Oregon
G	2	Damen Thacker	5 ft 11 in (1.8 m)	176 lb (80 kg)	Sr	Walla Walla Community College	Meridian, Idaho
G	5	Hunter-Jack Madden	6 ft 1 in (1.85 m)	182 lb (83 kg)	Fr	Shore School	Sydney, Australia
G	10	Isaac Berglund	6 ft 2 in (1.88 m)	182 lb (83 kg)	RS Fr	Deer Park High School	Deer Park, Washington
G	11	Kendall McHugh	6 ft 1 in (1.85 m)	163 lb (74 kg)	So	College of Southern Idaho	Centreville, Virginia
G/F	12	Chance Garvin	6 ft 4 in (1.93 m)	192 lb (87 kg)	Sr	Lake Roosevelt High School	Coulee Dam, Washington
G	13	DeAndre Robinson	6 ft 4 in (1.93 m)	205 lb (93 kg)	Jr	Tallahassee Community College	Monroeville, Alabama
G	20	Ethan Kilgore	6 ft 5 in (1.96 m)	203 lb (92 kg)	Fr	East Buchanan High School	Gower, Missouri
G	21	Gabe Quinnett	6 ft 4 in (1.93 m)	201 lb (91 kg)	So	Moscow High School	Moscow, Idaho
G	22	A.J. Youngman	6 ft 3 in (1.91 m)	195 lb (88 kg)	Jr	Otero Junior College	Peoria, Illinois
F	23	Babacar Thiombane	6 ft 7 in (2.01 m)	198 lb (90 kg)	Sr	East Los Angeles College	Los Angeles, California
F	32	Tanner Christensen	6 ft 10 in (2.08 m)	260 lb (118 kg)	Fr	University High School	Spokane Valley, Washington
F	34	Scott Blakney	6 ft 8 in (2.03 m)	231 lb (105 kg)	Sr	Prosser High School	Prosser, Washington
C	41	Jack Wilson	6 ft 11 in (2.11 m)	236 lb (107 kg)	Jr	Oregon State	Montara, California

Head coach

- Zac Claus
  (Eastern Washington)

Assistant coach(es)

- Doug Novsek (Southern Illinois)
- Kenny Tripp (Regis)
- Johnny Hill (Purdue)

Legend

- (C) Team captain
- (S) Suspended
- (I) Ineligible
- (W) Walk-on
- Injured
- Current redshirt

Roster
Last update: December 3, 2020

== Schedule and results ==
Date time, TV	Rank^{#}	Opponent^{#}	Result	Record	Site (attendance) city, state
Regular season
November 25, 2020*; 2:00 pm		vs. Seattle; Portland Invitational	Canceled		Chiles Center; Portland, OR
November 27, 2020*; 4:00 pm		at Portland; Portland Invitational	Canceled		Chiles Center; Portland, OR
November 30, 2020*; 6:05 pm		vs. William Jessup; Portland Invitational	Canceled		Chiles Center; Portland, OR
December 3, 2020; 5:05 pm, Pluto TV		at Sacramento State	L 55–77	0–1 (0–1)	Hornets Nest; Sacramento, CA
December 5, 2020; 10:35 am, Pluto TV		at Sacramento State	L 57–73	0–2 (0–2)	Hornets Nest; Sacramento, CA
December 9, 2020*; 6:00 pm, P12N		at Washington State; Battle of the Palouse	L 58–61	0–3	Beasley Coliseum; Pullman, WA
December 12, 2020*; 1:00 pm		at Cal State Bakersfield	L 66–76	0–4	Icardo Center; Bakersfield, CA
December 14, 2020*; 6:00 pm		at No. 1 Gonzaga	Canceled		McCarthey Athletic Center; Spokane, WA
December 18, 2020*; 6:00 pm		at Utah	L 41–79	0–5	Jon M. Huntsman Center; Salt Lake City, UT
December 31, 2020; 6:00 pm, Pluto TV		Northern Arizona	L 65–78	0–6 (0–3)	Memorial Gymnasium; Moscow, ID
January 2, 2021; 12:00 pm, Pluto TV		Northern Arizona	L 78–83 ^{OT}	0–7 (0–4)	Memorial Gymnasium; Moscow, ID
January 7, 2021; 6:00 pm, Pluto TV		at Southern Utah	L 80–85	0–8 (0–5)	America First Event Center; Cedar City, UT
January 9, 2021; 11:00 am, Pluto TV		at Southern Utah	L 67–83	0–9 (0–6)	America First Event Center; Cedar City, UT
January 14, 2021; 6:00 pm, Pluto TV		Northern Colorado	L 54–74	0–10 (0–7)	Memorial Gymnasium; Moscow, ID
January 16, 2021; 12:00 pm, SWX		Northern Colorado	L 61–75	0–11 (0–8)	Memorial Gymnasium; Moscow, ID
January 28, 2021; 6:00 pm, Pluto TV		Weber State	L 56–81	0–12 (0–9)	Memorial Gymnasium; Moscow, ID
January 30, 2021; 12:00 pm, SWX		Weber State	L 62–81	0–13 (0–10)	Memorial Gymnasium; Moscow, ID
February 4, 2021; 6:00 pm, Pluto TV		Eastern Washington	L 75–89	0–14 (0–11)	Memorial Gymnasium; Moscow, ID
February 6, 2021; 12:05 pm, SWX		at Eastern Washington	L 64–90	0–15 (0–12)	Reese Court; Cheney, WA
February 11, 2021; 6:00 pm, Pluto TV		at Idaho State; Battle of the Domes	L 43–69	0–16 (0–13)	Reed Gym; Pocatello, ID
February 13, 2021; 11:00 am, Pluto TV		at Idaho State; Battle of the Domes	L 58–64	0–17 (0–14)	Reed Gym; Pocatello, ID
February 18, 2021; 7:05 pm, Pluto TV		at Portland State	L 64–84	0–18 (0–15)	Viking Pavilion; Portland, OR
February 20, 2021; 12:00 pm, Pluto TV		Portland State	L 40–71	0–19 (0–16)	Memorial Gymnasium; Moscow, ID
February 25, 2021; 6:00 pm, SWX		Montana State	W 74–69	1–19 (1–16)	Memorial Gymnasium; Moscow, ID
February 27, 2021; 12:00 pm, Pluto TV		Montana State	L 61–71	1–20 (1–17)	Memorial Gymnasium; Moscow, ID
March 4, 2021; 4:00 pm, SWX		at Montana	Canceled		Dahlberg Arena; Missoula, MT
March 6, 2021; 11:00 am		at Montana	Canceled		Dahlberg Arena; Missoula, MT
Big Sky tournament
March 10, 2021; 2:30 pm, Pluto TV	(11)	vs. (6) Montana; First Round	L 64–69	1–21	Idaho Central Arena; Boise, Idaho
*Non-conference game. ^{#}Rankings from AP Poll. (#) Tournament seedings in parentheses. All times are in Pacific.
