= 2020–21 Montana Grizzlies basketball team =

American college basketball season

2020–21 Montana Grizzlies basketball
- Conference: Big Sky Conference
- Record: 15–13 (7–9 Big Sky)
- Head coach: Travis DeCuire (7th season)
- Associate head coach: Chris Cobb
- Assistant coaches: Jay Flores; Zach Payne
- Home arena: Dahlberg Arena

2020–21 Big Sky men's basketball standings
	Conf.				Overall
Team	W		L	PCT	W		L	PCT
Southern Utah	12	–	2	.857	20	–	4	.833
Weber State	12	–	3	.800	17	–	6	.739
Eastern Washington†	12	–	3	.800	16	–	8	.667
Montana State	8	–	6	.571	13	–	10	.565
Idaho State	8	–	6	.571	13	–	11	.542
Montana	7	–	9	.438	15	–	13	.536
Northern Colorado	6	–	8	.429	11	–	11	.500
Portland State	6	–	8	.429	9	–	13	.409
Sacramento State	5	–	9	.357	8	–	12	.400
Northern Arizona	4	–	10	.286	6	–	16	.273
Idaho	1	–	17	.056	1	–	21	.045
† Conference tournament winner

The 2020–21 Montana Grizzlies men's basketball team represented the University of Montana in the 2020–21 NCAA Division I men's basketball season. The Grizzlies, led by seventh-year head coach Travis DeCuire, played their home games at Dahlberg Arena in Missoula, Montana as members of the Big Sky Conference. In a season limited due to the ongoing COVID-19 pandemic, the Grizzlies finished the season 15–3, 7–9 in Big Sky play to finish in sixth place. They defeated Idaho and Weber State in the Big Sky tournament before losing to Eastern Washington in the semifinals.

== Previous season ==
The Grizzlies finished the 2019–20 season 18–13, 14–6 in Big Sky play to finish in third place. They were scheduled to play Idaho State in the quarterfinals of the Big Sky tournament, but due to the ongoing COVID-19 pandemic, all postseason tournaments were canceled, including the remainder of the Big Sky tournament.

== Offseason ==
=== Departures ===
Name	Number	Pos.	Height	Weight	Year	Hometown	Reason for departure
Timmy Falls	1	G	6'2"	170	Junior	Dublin, California	Left team
Kendal Manuel	2	G	6'4"	190	RS Senior	Billings, Montana	Graduated
Sayeed Pridgett	4	G	6'5"	201	Senior	Oakland, California	Graduated
Naseem Gaskin	5	G	6'5"	185	RS Freshman	Oakland, California	Left team
Jett Briceno	13	G	6'4"	180	Freshman	Kent, Washington	Transferred to Bellevue College
Yagizhan Selcuk	22	F	6'8"	233	RS Sophomore	Istanbul, Turkey	Transferred to Missouri Southern
Peter Jones	32	F	6'8"	210	RS Sophomore	Seattle, Washington	Walk on; didn't return
Jared Samuelson	33	F	6'7"	215	RS Senior	Billings, Montana	Graduated

=== Incoming transfers ===
Name	Number	Pos.	Height	Weight	Year	Hometown	Previous School
Cameron Parker	11	G	6'2"	170	Junior	Beaverton, Oregon	Transferred from Sacred Heart. Received an eligibility waiver from the NCAA to play immediately.

=== 2020 recruiting class ===
College recruiting information (2020)
Name	Hometown	School	Height	Weight	Commit date
Brandon Whitney; PG	Mission Hills, CA	Bishop Alemany High School	6 ft 1 in (1.85 m)	165 lb (75 kg)	
Brandon Whitney; PG	Recruit ratings: Scout: Rivals: (NR)				
Overall recruit ranking:
Note: In many cases, Scout, Rivals, 247Sports, On3, and ESPN may conflict in their listings of height and weight.; In these cases, the average was taken. ESPN grades are on a 100-point scale.; Sources: "2020 Team Ranking". Rivals.

== Roster ==
2020–21 Montana Grizzlies men's basketball team
Players
Coaches

Pos.	#	Name	Height	Weight	Year	Previous school	Hometown
G	0	Kyle Owens	6 ft 8 in (2.03 m)	205 lb (93 kg)	So	Crespi Carmelite High School	Calabasas, California
F	1	Michael Steadman	6 ft 11 in (2.11 m)	215 lb (98 kg)	RS Sr	San Jose State	Union City, California
F	2	Darius Henderson	6 ft 9 in (2.06 m)	220 lb (100 kg)	Jr	UMass Lowell	Pasadena, California
G	3	Josh Vazquez	6 ft 3 in (1.91 m)	180 lb (82 kg)	So	Bishop Montgomery High School	Torrance, California
G	5	Robby Beasley III	6 ft 3 in (1.91 m)	190 lb (86 kg)	Fr	Dublin High School	San Ramon, California
G	10	Eddy Egun	6 ft 4 in (1.93 m)	204 lb (93 kg)	RS So	El Camino Real High School	Woodland Hills, California
G	11	Cameron Parker	6 ft 2 in (1.88 m)	170 lb (77 kg)	Jr	Sacred Heart	Beaverton, Oregon
G	12	Brandon Whitney	6 ft 1 in (1.85 m)	178 lb (81 kg)	Fr	Bishop Alemany High School	Mission Hills, California
F	13	Josh Bannan	6 ft 9 in (2.06 m)	215 lb (98 kg)	Fr	UC Lake Ginninderra	Melbourne, Australia
F	23	Mack Anderson	6 ft 9 in (2.06 m)	208 lb (94 kg)	Jr	Bozeman High School	Bozeman, Montana
G	24	Freddy Brown III	6 ft 2 in (1.88 m)	178 lb (81 kg)	RS So	Nathan Hale High School	Seattle, Washington
F	35	Derrick Carter-Hollinger	6 ft 5 in (1.96 m)	212 lb (96 kg)	So	Foothills Christian High School	San Diego, California

Head coach

- Travis DeCuire (Montana)

Assistant coach(es)

- Chris Cobb (Menlo)
- Jay Flores (Chico State)
- Zach Payne (Whitworth)

Legend

- (C) Team captain
- (S) Suspended
- (I) Ineligible
- (W) Walk-on
- Injured
- Current redshirt

Roster
Last update: January 29, 2021

== Schedule and results ==
Date time, TV	Rank^{#}	Opponent^{#}	Result	Record	Site (attendance) city, state
Regular season
November 28, 2020*; 7:00 pm, P12N		at USC	L 62–76	0–1	Galen Center; Los Angeles, CA
December 3, 2020; 7:00 pm, Pluto TV		at Southern Utah	L 63–64	0–2 (0–1)	America First Event Center; Cedar City, UT
December 5, 2020; 12:00 pm, Pluto TV		at Southern Utah	L 74–75	0–3 (0–2)	America First Event Center; Cedar City, UT
December 8, 2020*; 5:00 pm, SECN		at Georgia	L 50–63	0–4	Stegeman Coliseum (1,638); Athens, GA
December 12, 2020*; 2:00 pm, Pluto TV		Yellowstone Christian College	W 102–42	1–4	Dahlberg Arena; Missoula, MT
December 16, 2020*; 9:00 pm, P12N		at Washington	W 66–58	2–4	Alaska Airlines Arena; Seattle, WA
December 18, 2020*; 4:00 pm, Pluto TV		Dickinson State	W 78–51	3–4	Dahlberg Arena; Missoula, MT
December 22, 2020*; 5:00 pm, P12N		at Arizona	L 64–70	3–5	McKale Center; Tucson, AZ
January 2, 2021; 5:00 pm, SWX MT		Northern Colorado	L 62–64	3–6 (0–3)	Dahlberg Arena; Missoula, MT
January 4, 2021; 9:00 am, SWX MT		Northern Colorado	W 56–54	4–6 (1–3)	Dahlberg Arena; Missoula, MT
January 9, 2021*; 2:00 pm, Pluto TV		Whitworth	W 84–67	5–6	Dahlberg Arena; Missoula, MT
January 14, 2021; 5:00 pm, SWX MT		Northern Arizona	W 67–56	6–6 (2–3)	Dahlberg Arena; Missoula, MT
January 16, 2021; 11:00 am, Pluto TV		Northern Arizona	L 58–62	6–7 (2–4)	Dahlberg Arena; Missoula, MT
January 21, 2021; 6:00 pm, Pluto TV		at Sacramento State	W 78–66	7–7 (3–4)	Hornets Nest; Sacramento, CA
January 23, 2021; 12:00 pm, Pluto TV		at Sacramento State	L 83–89 ^{2OT}	7–8 (3–5)	Hornets Nest; Sacramento, CA
January 28, 2021; 7:00 pm, SWX MT		Montana State	Canceled		Dahlberg Arena; Missoula, MT
January 30, 2021; 2:00 pm, SWX MT		at Montana State	Canceled		Brick Breeden Fieldhouse; Bozeman, MT
February 4, 2021; 8:00 pm, Pluto TV		at Portland State	W 70–64	8–8 (4–5)	Viking Pavilion; Portland, OR
February 6, 2021; 1:00 pm, Pluto TV		at Portland State	L 56–61	8–9 (4–6)	Viking Pavilion; Portland, OR
February 11, 2021; 5:00 pm, Pluto TV		Weber State	W 80-67	9-9 (5-6)	Dahlberg Arena; Missoula, MT
February 13, 2021; 12:00 pm, SWX MT		Weber State	L 82–91	9–10 (5–7)	Dahlberg Arena; Missoula, MT
February 18, 2021; 7:00 pm, SWX MT		at Eastern Washington	L 76–90	9–11 (5–8)	Reese Court; Cheney, WA
February 20, 2021; 12:00 pm, SWX MT		Eastern Washington	L 76–90	9–12 (5–9)	Dahlberg Arena; Missoula, MT
February 25, 2021; 7:00 pm, Pluto TV		at Idaho State	W 64–58	10–12 (6–9)	Reed Gym (40); Pocatello, ID
February 27, 2021; 11:00 am, Pluto TV		at Idaho State	W 59–58	11–12 (7–9)	Reed Gym (50); Pocatello, ID
February 28, 2021*; 7:30 pm, Pluto TV		Yellowstone Christian College	Canceled		Dahlberg Arena; Missoula, MT
March 4, 2021; 5:00 pm, SWX MT		Idaho	Canceled		Dahlberg Arena; Missoula, MT
March 5, 2021*; 5:00 pm, Pluto TV		Warner Pacific	W 92–61	12–12	Dahlberg Arena; Missoula, MT
March 6, 2021; 12:00 pm, Pluto TV		Idaho	Canceled		Dahlberg Arena; Missoula, MT
March 6, 2021*; 2:00 pm, Pluto TV		Warner Pacific	W 80–62	13–12	Dahlberg Arena; Missoula, MT
Big Sky tournament
March 10, 2021; 3:00 pm, Pluto TV	(6)	vs. (11) Idaho; First round	W 69–64	14–12	Idaho Central Arena; Boise, ID
March 11, 2021; 8:00 pm, Pluto TV	(6)	vs. (3) Weber State; Quarterfinals	W 80–75	15–12	Idaho Central Arena; Boise, ID
March 12, 2021; 8:00 pm, Pluto TV	(6)	vs. (2) Eastern Washington; Semifinals	L 50–78	15–13	Idaho Central Arena; Boise, ID
*Non-conference game. ^{#}Rankings from AP Poll. (#) Tournament seedings in parentheses. All times are in Mountain.
