= 2020–21 Northern Arizona Lumberjacks men's basketball team =

American college basketball season

2020–21 Northern Arizona Lumberjacks men's basketball
- Conference: Big Sky Conference
- Record: 6–16 (4–10 Big Sky)
- Head coach: Shane Burcar (2nd season)
- Assistant coaches: Gaellan Bewernick (2nd season); Tyler Ojanen (2nd season); Chris Fowler (1st season)
- Captains: Brooks DeBisschop; Luke Avdalovic; Cameron Shelton
- Home arena: Rolle Activity Center

2020–21 Big Sky men's basketball standings
	Conf.				Overall
Team	W		L	PCT	W		L	PCT
Southern Utah	12	–	2	.857	20	–	4	.833
Weber State	12	–	3	.800	17	–	6	.739
Eastern Washington†	12	–	3	.800	16	–	8	.667
Montana State	8	–	6	.571	13	–	10	.565
Idaho State	8	–	6	.571	13	–	11	.542
Montana	7	–	9	.438	15	–	13	.536
Northern Colorado	6	–	8	.429	11	–	11	.500
Portland State	6	–	8	.429	9	–	13	.409
Sacramento State	5	–	9	.357	8	–	12	.400
Northern Arizona	4	–	10	.286	6	–	16	.273
Idaho	1	–	17	.056	1	–	21	.045
† Conference tournament winner

The 2020–21 Northern Arizona Lumberjacks men's basketball team represented Northern Arizona University in the 2020-21 NCAA Division I men's basketball season. The Lumberjacks were led by second year head coach Shane Burcar, and played their home games at the Rolle Activity Center as members of the Big Sky Conference. They finished the season 6–16, 4–10 in Big Sky Play to finish in 10th place. They defeated Portland State in the first round before losing in the quarterfinals to Eastern Washington.

== Previous season ==
The Lumberjacks finished the 2019-20 season 16–14 overall, 10–10 in Big Sky play to finish in a tie for 5th place - both improvements from the previous season. In the Big Sky Conference tournament, they lost to Idaho State in the first round.

== Roster ==
2020–21 Northern Arizona Lumberjacks men's basketball team
Players
Coaches

Pos.	#	Name	Height	Weight	Year	Previous school	Hometown
G	1	Jay Green	6 ft 5 in (1.96 m)	205 lb (93 kg)	RS Jr	Hillcrest Prep; UNLV	Sydney, Australia
F	2	Ajang Aguek	6 ft 8 in (2.03 m)	195 lb (88 kg)	So	Ironwood	Glendale, Arizona
G	3	Davy Cummard	6 ft 0 in (1.83 m)	210 lb (95 kg)	RS Jr	Mesa	Mesa, Arizona
G	4	Carter Mahaney	6 ft 2 in (1.88 m)	185 lb (84 kg)	Fr	Campolindo	Lafayette, California
G	5	Charles Burns	6 ft 1 in (1.85 m)	150 lb (68 kg)	So	Loyola Sacred Heart	Lolo, Montana
F	10	Olgierd Dmochewicz	6 ft 11 in (2.11 m)	210 lb (95 kg)	Fr	SMS Pzkosz Wladyslawowo	Konstancin-Jeziorna, Poland
F	11	Jackson Larsen	6 ft 7 in (2.01 m)	190 lb (86 kg)	RS Fr	Christian	El Cajon, California
F	13	Keith Haymon	6 ft 7 in (2.01 m)	190 lb (86 kg)	RS So	Cypress Ranch	Cypress, Texas
G	14	Isaiah Lewis	6 ft 6 in (1.98 m)	200 lb (91 kg)	So	Lone Star	Little Elm, Texas
F	15	Nik Mains	6 ft 9 in (2.06 m)	205 lb (93 kg)	RS Jr	Pinnacle	Scottsdale, Arizona
G	20	Cameron Shelton	6 ft 2 in (1.88 m)	175 lb (79 kg)	Jr	Damien	Chino, California
G	21	Luke Avdalovic	6 ft 5 in (1.96 m)	190 lb (86 kg)	RS Jr	Vista del Lago	Folsom, California
F	22	Wynton Brown	6 ft 8 in (2.03 m)	215 lb (98 kg)	Fr	St. John Bosco	Bellflower, California
F	33	Carson Towt	6 ft 7 in (2.01 m)	220 lb (100 kg)	RS Fr	Gilbert; Cal Baptist	Gilbert, Arizona

Head coach

- Shane Burcar

Assistant coach(es)

- Gaellan Bewernick (Northern Arizona)
- Tyler Ojanen (Cal Baptist)
- Chris Fowler (Central Michigan)

Legend

- (C) Team captain
- (S) Suspended
- (I) Ineligible
- (W) Walk-on
- Injured
- Current redshirt

Roster
Last update: December 5, 2020

== Schedule and results ==
Date time, TV	Rank^{#}	Opponent^{#}	Result	Record	Site (attendance) city, state
Regular season
December 7, 2020*; 7:00 pm, P12N		at Arizona	L 53–96	0–1	McKale Center; Tucson, AZ
December 10, 2020*; 6:00 pm, Pluto TV		UC Riverside	L 50–74	0–2	Rolle Activity Center; Flagstaff, AZ
December 14, 2020*; 6:00 pm		at Colorado State	L 52–91	0–3	Moby Arena; Fort Collins, CO
December 18, 2020; 12:00 pm, Pluto TV		Eastern Washington	Canceled due to positive COVID-19 tests		Rolle Activity Center; Flagstaff, AZ
December 19, 2020; 4:00 pm, Pluto TV		Eastern Washington	L 64–80	0–4 (0–1)	Rolle Activity Center; Flagstaff, AZ
December 21, 2020*; 1:00 pm		vs. Texas State	L 65–70	0–5	Hamilton Gymnasium; Denver, CO
December 22, 2020*; 1:00 pm		at Denver	W 68–65	1–5	Hamilton Gymnasium; Denver, CO
December 28, 2020*; 7:00 pm, RTNW		at No. 1 Gonzaga	L 58–88	1–6	McCarthey Athletic Center; Spokane, WA
December 31, 2020; 6:00 pm, Pluto TV		at Idaho	W 78–65	2–6 (1–1)	Cowan Spectrum; Moscow, ID
January 2, 2021; 12:00 pm, Pluto TV		at Idaho	W 83–78 ^{OT}	3–6 (2–1)	Cowan Spectrum; Moscow, ID
January 7, 2021; 6:00 pm, Pluto TV		Idaho State	L 69–73	3–7 (2–2)	Rolle Activity Center; Flagstaff, AZ
January 9, 2021; 12:00 pm, Pluto TV		Idaho State	L 70–76	3–8 (2–3)	Rolle Activity Center; Flagstaff, AZ
January 14, 2021; 5:00 pm, Pluto TV		at Montana	L 56–67	3–9 (2–4)	Dahlberg Arena; Missoula, MT
January 16, 2021; 11:00 am, Pluto TV		at Montana	W 62–58	4–9 (3–4)	Dahlberg Arena; Missoula, MT
January 21, 2021; 6:00 pm, Pluto TV		Montana State	L 51–62	4–10 (3–5)	Rolle Activity Center; Flagstaff, AZ
January 23, 2020; 12:00 pm, Pluto TV		Montana State	L 53–58	4–11 (3–6)	Rolle Activity Center; Flagstaff, AZ
January 29, 2021; 6:00 pm, Pluto TV		Northern Colorado	W 68–64	5–11 (4–6)	Rolle Activity Center; Flagstaff, AZ
February 4, 2021; 6:00 pm, Pluto TV		at Sacramento State	Canceled due to positive COVID-19 tests		Hornets Nest; Sacramento, CA
February 6, 2021; 12:00 pm, Pluto TV		at Sacramento State	Canceled due to positive COVID-19 tests		Hornets Nest; Sacramento, CA
February 11, 2021; 6:00 pm, Pluto TV		Portland State	Canceled due to positive COVID-19 tests		Rolle Activity Center; Flagstaff, AZ
February 13, 2021; 12:00 pm, Pluto TV		Portland State	Canceled due to positive COVID-19 tests		Rolle Activity Center; Flagstaff, AZ
February 18, 2021; 7:00 pm, Pluto TV		at Weber State	L 59-92	5-12 (4-7)	Dee Events Center; Ogden, UT
February 20, 2021; 12:00 pm, Pluto TV		Weber State	L 52–74	5–13 (4–8)	Dee Events Center; Ogden, UT
February 24, 2021; 7:00 pm, Pluto TV		at Southern Utah	L 80–85	5–14 (4–9)	America First Event Center; Cedar City, UT
February 26, 2021; 12:00 pm, Pluto TV		Southern Utah	L 62–92	5–15 (4–10)	Rolle Activity Center; Flagstaff, AZ
Big Sky tournament
March 10, 2021; 12:00 pm, Pluto TV	(10)	vs. (7) Portland State; First round	W 77–66	6–15	Idaho Central Arena; Boise, ID
March 11, 2021; 6:00 pm, Pluto TV	(10)	vs. (2) Eastern Washington; Second round	L 60–66	6–16	Idaho Central Arena; Boise, ID
*Non-conference game. ^{#}Rankings from AP Poll. (#) Tournament seedings in parentheses. All times are in Mountain.
