= 2020–21 Montana State Bobcats men's basketball team =

American college basketball season

2020–21 Montana State Bobcats men's basketball
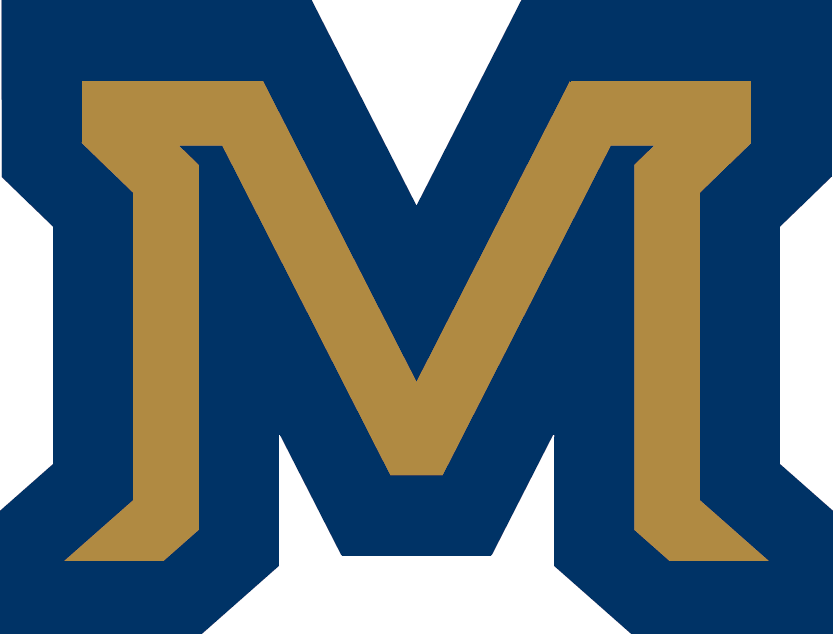
- Conference: Big Sky Conference
- Record: 13–10 (8–6 Big Sky)
- Head coach: Danny Sprinkle (2nd season)
- Assistant coaches: Chris Haslam; Dan Russell; Ken Moses
- Home arena: Brick Breeden Fieldhouse

2020–21 Big Sky men's basketball standings
	Conf.				Overall
Team	W		L	PCT	W		L	PCT
Southern Utah	12	–	2	.857	20	–	4	.833
Weber State	12	–	3	.800	17	–	6	.739
Eastern Washington†	12	–	3	.800	16	–	8	.667
Montana State	8	–	6	.571	13	–	10	.565
Idaho State	8	–	6	.571	13	–	11	.542
Montana	7	–	9	.438	15	–	13	.536
Northern Colorado	6	–	8	.429	11	–	11	.500
Portland State	6	–	8	.429	9	–	13	.409
Sacramento State	5	–	9	.357	8	–	12	.400
Northern Arizona	4	–	10	.286	6	–	16	.273
Idaho	1	–	17	.056	1	–	21	.045
† Conference tournament winner

The 2020–21 Montana State Bobcats men's basketball team represented Montana State University in the 2020–21 NCAA Division I men's basketball season. The Bobcats, led by second-year head coach Danny Sprinkle, played their home games at Brick Breeden Fieldhouse in Bozeman, Montana as members of the Big Sky Conference. In a season limited due to the ongoing COVID-19 pandemic, they finished the season 13–10, 8–6 in Big Sky play to finish in a tie for fourth place. They defeated Idaho State and Southern Utah before losing to Eastern Washington in the championship of the Big Sky tournament.

== Previous season ==
The Bobcats finished the 2019–20 season 16–15, 10–10 in Big Sky play to finish in a tie for fifth place. They received the #5 seed in the Big Sky tournament, and were slated to go up against the #4 seed Portland State in the quarterfinals, but the tournament was cancelled due to the ongoing COVID-19 pandemic.

== Roster ==
2020–21 Montana State Bobcats men's basketball team
Players
Coaches

Pos.	#	Name	Height	Weight	Year	Previous school	Hometown
G/F	0	Abdul Mohamed	6 ft 7 in (2.01 m)	200 lb (91 kg)	Sr	North Texas	Ottawa, Ontario
G	1	Xavier Bishop	5 ft 8 in (1.73 m)	155 lb (70 kg)	RS Sr	UMKC	Springfield, Illinois
G	2	Nick Gazelas	6 ft 4 in (1.93 m)	190 lb (86 kg)	So	Jacksonville College	Humble, Texas
F	3	Finn Fleute	6 ft 10 in (2.08 m)	235 lb (107 kg)	So	Uni Baskets Paderborn	Essen, Germany
F	4	Bilal Shabazz	6 ft 8 in (2.03 m)	210 lb (95 kg)	Jr	Trinidad State Junior College	Milwaukee, Wisconsin
G	5	Amin Adamu	6 ft 5 in (1.96 m)	190 lb (86 kg)	Sr	Casper College	London, England
G	10	Caleb Bellach	6 ft 6 in (1.98 m)	195 lb (88 kg)	So	Manhattan Christian School	Manhattan, Montana
G	11	Tyler Patterson	6 ft 8 in (2.03 m)	180 lb (82 kg)	Fr	Mount Si High School	Snoqualmie, Washington
G	12	Mike Hood	6 ft 2 in (1.88 m)	185 lb (84 kg)	Jr	College of Southern Idaho	Kansas City, Missouri
F	13	Jubrile Belo	6 ft 9 in (2.06 m)	240 lb (109 kg)	Jr	Lamar Community College	London, England
G	15	Carter Ash	6 ft 0 in (1.83 m)	165 lb (75 kg)	Fr	Bozeman High School	Bozeman, Montana
G	20	Jesse Owens	5 ft 9 in (1.75 m)	170 lb (77 kg)	RS Fr	Billings West High School	Billings, Montana
F	23	Borja Fernandez	6 ft 7 in (2.01 m)	230 lb (104 kg)	So	FC Barcelona U18	Bilbao, Spain
G	24	Kellen Tynes	6 ft 3 in (1.91 m)	165 lb (75 kg)	Fr	Rothesay Netherwood School	Dartmouth, Nova Scotia
F	31	Devin Kirby	6 ft 11 in (2.11 m)	225 lb (102 kg)	Sr	Basha High School	Chandler, Arizona

Head coach

- Danny Sprinkle (Montana State)

Assistant coach(es)

- Chris Haslam (Wyoming)
- Dan Russell (Wyoming)
- Ken Moses (CSU Pueblo)

Legend

- (C) Team captain
- (S) Suspended
- (I) Ineligible
- (W) Walk-on
- Injured
- Current redshirt

Roster
Last update: November 29, 2020

== Schedule and results ==
Date time, TV	Rank^{#}	Opponent^{#}	Result	Record	Site (attendance) city, state
Regular season
November 25, 2020*; 7:30 pm		at UNLV	W 91–78	1–0	Thomas & Mack Center; Paradise, NV
December 2, 2020*; 3:00 pm		at Pacific	L 70–74 ^{OT}	1–1	Alex G. Spanos Center; Stockton, CA
December 13, 2020*; 2:00 pm, Pluto TV		Yellowstone Christian	W 114–74	2–1	Brick Breeden Fieldhouse; Bozeman, MT
December 18, 2020*; 7:00 pm, P12N		at Washington State	L 54–82	2–2	Beasley Coliseum; Pullman, WA
December 22, 2020*; 1:00 pm, NBCSNW		at Portland	L 59–62	2–3	Chiles Center; Portland, OR
December 31, 2020; 2:30 pm, Pluto TV		Southern Utah	Canceled		Brick Breeden Fieldhouse; Bozeman, MT
January 1, 2021*; 2:00 pm, Pluto TV		Montana Western	W 96–67	3–3	Brick Breeden Fieldhouse; Bozeman, MT
January 2, 2021; 12:00 pm, Pluto TV		Southern Utah	Canceled		Brick Breeden Fieldhouse; Bozeman, MT
January 7, 2021; 6:30 pm, Pluto TV		at Northern Colorado	W 79–67	4–3 (1–0)	Bank of Colorado Arena; Greeley, CO
January 9, 2021; 12:00 pm, Pluto TV		at Northern Colorado	W 76–74	5–3 (2–0)	Bank of Colorado Arena; Greeley, CO
January 14, 2021; 7:00 pm, Pluto TV		Portland State	W 71–64	6–3 (3–0)	Brick Breeden Fieldhouse; Bozeman, MT
January 16, 2021; 12:00 pm, Pluto TV		Portland State	W 69–64	7–3 (4–0)	Brick Breeden Fieldhouse; Bozeman, MT
January 21, 2021; 6:00 pm, Pluto TV		at Northern Arizona	W 62–51	8–3 (5–0)	Rolle Activity Center; Flagstaff, AZ
January 23, 2021; 12:00 pm, Pluto TV		at Northern Arizona	W 58–53	9–3 (6–0)	Rolle Activity Center; Flagstaff, AZ
January 28, 2021; 7:00 pm, SWX MT		at Montana	Canceled		Dahlberg Arena; Missoula, MT
January 30, 2021; 2:00 pm, SWX MT		Montana	Canceled		Brick Breeden Fieldhouse; Bozeman, MT
February 4, 2021; 7:00 pm, Pluto TV		at Weber State	L 88–96	9–4 (6–1)	Dee Events Center (810); Ogden, UT
February 6, 2021; 12:00 pm, Pluto TV		at Weber State	L 74–82	9–5 (6–2)	Dee Events Center; Ogden, UT
February 11, 2021; 5:00 pm, SWX MT		Eastern Washington	L 77–93	9–6 (6–3)	Brick Breeden Fieldhouse; Bozeman, MT
February 13, 2021; 12:00 pm, Pluto TV		Eastern Washington	L 69–85	9–7 (6–4)	Brick Breeden Fieldhouse; Bozeman, MT
February 18, 2021; 5:00 pm, SWX MT		Idaho State	Canceled		Brick Breeden Fieldhouse; Bozeman, MT
February 20, 2021; 2:00 pm, Pluto TV		at Idaho State	Canceled		Reed Gym; Pocatello, ID
February 26, 2021; 5:00 pm, SWX MT		at Idaho	L 69–74	9–8 (6–5)	Memorial Gymnasium; Moscow, ID
February 28, 2021; 1:00 pm, Pluto TV		at Idaho	W 71–61	10–8 (7–5)	Memorial Gymnasium; Moscow, ID
March 5, 2021; 12:00 pm, Pluto TV		Sacramento State	W 77–75	11–8 (8–5)	Brick Breeden Fieldhouse; Bozeman, MT
March 6, 2021; 11:00 am, SWX MT		Sacramento State	L 73–74	11–9 (8–6)	Brick Breeden Fieldhouse; Bozeman, MT
Big Sky tournament
March 11, 2021; 2:00 pm, Pluto TV	(5)	vs. (4) Idaho State; Quarterfinals	W 71–63	12–9	Idaho Central Arena; Boise, ID
March 12, 2021; 5:00 pm, Pluto TV	(5)	vs. (1) Southern Utah; Semifinals	W 80–77 ^{OT}	13–9	Idaho Central Arena; Boise, ID
March 13, 2021; 6:00 pm, ESPNU	(5)	vs. (2) Eastern Washington; Championship	L 55–65	13–10	Idaho Central Arena; Boise, ID
*Non-conference game. ^{#}Rankings from AP Poll. (#) Tournament seedings in parentheses. All times are in Mountain.
