= 2020–21 Eastern Washington Eagles men's basketball team =

American college basketball season

2020–21 Eastern Washington Eagles men's basketball

Big Sky tournament champions

NCAA tournament, First Round
- Conference: Big Sky Conference
- Record: 16–8 (12–3 Big Sky)
- Head coach: Shantay Legans (4th season)
- Associate head coach: David Riley
- Assistant coaches: Bobby Suarez; T.J. Lipold
- Home arena: Reese Court

2020–21 Big Sky men's basketball standings
	Conf.				Overall
Team	W		L	PCT	W		L	PCT
Southern Utah	12	–	2	.857	20	–	4	.833
Weber State	12	–	3	.800	17	–	6	.739
Eastern Washington†	12	–	3	.800	16	–	8	.667
Montana State	8	–	6	.571	13	–	10	.565
Idaho State	8	–	6	.571	13	–	11	.542
Montana	7	–	9	.438	15	–	13	.536
Northern Colorado	6	–	8	.429	11	–	11	.500
Portland State	6	–	8	.429	9	–	13	.409
Sacramento State	5	–	9	.357	8	–	12	.400
Northern Arizona	4	–	10	.286	6	–	16	.273
Idaho	1	–	17	.056	1	–	21	.045
† Conference tournament winner

The 2020–21 Eastern Washington Eagles men's basketball team represented Eastern Washington University in the Big Sky Conference during the 2020–21 NCAA Division I men's basketball season. Led by fourth-year head coach Shantay Legans, the Eagles played their home games on campus at Reese Court in Cheney, Washington.

In the regular season, EWU was 13–7 overall (12–3, Big Sky, 2nd) and was seeded second in the conference tournament, which they won. Seeded fourteenth in the West regional of the NCAA tournament, they met twelfth-ranked Kansas in the round of 64. The Eagles scored the first nine points and led by eight at the half, but were overcome by the Jayhawks in the last ten minutes and lost by nine points; their season ended with an overall record of 16–8 (.667).

== Previous season ==
The Eagles finished the 2019–20 season 23–8 (16–4 in Big Sky, first). The top seed in the Big Sky tournament, Eastern was scheduled to take on the #9 seed Sacramento State in the quarterfinals, but the tournament was cancelled due to the COVID-19 pandemic.

== Roster ==
2020–21 Eastern Washington Eagles men's basketball team
Players
Coaches

Pos.	#	Name	Height	Weight	Year	Previous school	Hometown
G	0	Mutdung Bol	6 ft 3 in (1.91 m)	145 lb (66 kg)	Fr	Edmonds Woodway High School	North Seattle, Washington
G	1	Austin Fadal	6 ft 4 in (1.93 m)	175 lb (79 kg)	RS So	Hillcrest Prep	San Ramon, California
G/F	2	Steele Venters	6 ft 7 in (2.01 m)	175 lb (79 kg)	RS Fr	Ellensburg High School	Ellensburg, Washington
G	4	Isaiah Amato	6 ft 5 in (1.96 m)	175 lb (79 kg)	Fr	Central Catholic High School	Portland, Oregon
G	5	Casson Rouse	6 ft 2 in (1.88 m)	180 lb (82 kg)	RS So	Timberline High School	Lacey, Washington
G	10	Jacob Davison	6 ft 4 in (1.93 m)	175 lb (79 kg)	RS Sr	Cantwell-Sacred Heart High School	Long Beach, California
G	11	Jack Perry	6 ft 2 in (1.88 m)	175 lb (79 kg)	Sr	Camberwell Grammar School	Melbourne, Australia
G/F	15	Tyler Robertson	6 ft 6 in (1.98 m)	200 lb (91 kg)	So	Box Hill Senior Secondary College	Melbourne, Australia
F	21	Victor Radocaj	6 ft 9 in (2.06 m)	195 lb (88 kg)	Fr	RISE Centre Academy	Richmond, British Columbia
G/F	22	Kaelan O'Neil	6 ft 5 in (1.96 m)	180 lb (82 kg)	Fr	Churchill High School	Eugene, Oregon
F	23	Jordan Veening	6 ft 6 in (1.98 m)	205 lb (93 kg)	RS So	Nooksack Valley High School	Sumas, Washington
G/F	24	Kim Aiken Jr.	6 ft 7 in (2.01 m)	215 lb (98 kg)	RS Jr	East Valley High School	Redlands, California
G	25	Michael Meadows	6 ft 2 in (1.88 m)	175 lb (79 kg)	RS So	Campbell Hall School	Hollywood, California
G/F	33	Jacob Groves	6 ft 7 in (2.01 m)	185 lb (84 kg)	So	Shadle Park High School	Spokane, Washington
F	35	Tanner Groves	6 ft 9 in (2.06 m)	235 lb (107 kg)	RS Jr	Shadle Park High School	Spokane, Washington
G	55	Ellis Magnuson	6 ft 2 in (1.88 m)	190 lb (86 kg)	So	Borah High School	Boise, Idaho

Head coach

- Shantay Legans (Fresno State)

Assistant coach(es)

- David Riley (Whitworth)
- Bobby Suarez (Florida Gulf Coast)
- T.J. Lipold (Westmont College)

Legend

- (C) Team captain
- (S) Suspended
- (I) Ineligible
- (W) Walk-on
- Injured
- Current redshirt

Roster
Last update: December 2, 2020

== Schedule and results ==
Date time, TV	Rank^{#}	Opponent^{#}	Result	Record	Site (attendance) city, state
Non-conference regular season
November 28, 2020*; 8:06 pm, P12N		at Washington State	L 68–71	0–1	Beasley Coliseum; Pullman, WA
November 30, 2020*; 6:05 pm, Pluto TV		Montana Tech	Canceled		Reese Court; Cheney, WA
December 5, 2020*; 11:00 am, P12N		at Arizona	L 67–70	0–2	McKale Center; Tucson, AZ
December 7, 2020*; 4:00 pm, P12N		at No. 20 Oregon	L 52–69	0–3	Matthew Knight Arena; Eugene, OR
December 11, 2021*; 2:05 pm, Pluto TV		College of Idaho	W 80–56	1–3	Reese Court; Cheney, WA
December 15, 2020*; 7:00 pm		at Saint Mary's	L 75–80	1–4	University Credit Union Pavilion; Moraga, CA
Big Sky regular season
December 18, 2020; 6:05 pm, Pluto TV		at Northern Arizona	Canceled		Walkup Skydome; Flagstaff, Arizona
December 19, 2020; 3:05 pm, Pluto TV		at Northern Arizona	W 80–64	2–4 (1–0)	Walkup Skydome; Flagstaff, Arizona
December 31, 2020; 6:05 pm, Pluto TV		Portland State	Canceled		Reese Court; Cheney, Washington
January 2, 2021; 12:05 pm, Pluto TV		Portland State	Canceled		Reese Court; Cheney, Washington
January 7, 2021; 5:05 pm, Pluto TV		at Weber State	Canceled		Dee Events Center; Ogden, Utah
January 9, 2021; 11:05 am, Pluto TV		at Weber State	Canceled		Dee Events Center; Ogden, Utah
January 14, 2021; 6:05 pm, Pluto TV		Southern Utah	W 75–63	3–4 (2–0)	Reese Court; Cheney, Washington
January 16, 2021; 12:05 pm, Pluto TV		Southern Utah	L 94–99	3–5 (2–1)	Reese Court; Cheney, Washington
January 21, 2021; 5:05 pm, Pluto TV		at Northern Colorado	L 76–78	3–6 (2–2)	Bank of Colorado Arena; Greeley, Colorado
January 23, 2021; 11:05 am, Pluto TV		at Northern Colorado	W 82–76	4–6 (3–2)	Bank of Colorado Arena; Greeley, Colorado
January 31, 2021; 11:05 am, Pluto TV		Sacramento State	W 68–60	5–6 (4–2)	Reese Court; Cheney, Washington
February 1, 2021; 11:05 am, Pluto TV		Sacramento State	W 94–79	6–6 (5–2)	Reese Court; Cheney, Washington
February 4, 2021; 6:05 pm, Pluto TV		at Idaho	W 89–75	7–6 (6–2)	Cowan Spectrum; Moscow, Idaho
February 6, 2021; 12:05 pm, Pluto TV		Idaho	W 90–64	8–6 (7–2)	Reese Court; Cheney, Washington
February 11, 2021; 5:05 pm, Pluto TV		at Montana State	W 93-77	9-6 (8-2)	Brick Breeden Fieldhouse; Bozeman, Montana
February 13, 2021; 11:05 am, Pluto TV		at Montana State	W 85–69	10–6 (9–2)	Brick Breeden Fieldhouse; Bozeman, Montana
February 18, 2021; 6:05 pm, Pluto TV		Montana	W 90–76	11–6 (10–2)	Reese Court; Cheney, Washington
February 20, 2021; 11:05 am, Pluto TV		at Montana	W 90–76	12–6 (11–2)	Dahlberg Arena; Missoula, Montana
March 3, 2021; 6:05 pm, Pluto TV		Idaho State	L 63–68	12–7 (11–3)	Reese Court; Cheney, Washington
March 5, 2021; 12:05 pm, Pluto TV		Idaho State	W 75–62	13–7 (12–3)	Reese Court; Cheney, Washington
Big Sky tournament
March 11, 2021; 4:05 pm, Pluto TV	(2)	vs. (10) Northern Arizona; Quarterfinal	W 66–60	14–7	Idaho Central Arena; Boise, Idaho
March 12, 2021; 7:05 pm, Pluto TV	(2)	vs. (6) Montana; Semifinal	W 78–50	15–7	Idaho Central Arena; Boise, Idaho
March 13, 2021; 5:00 pm, ESPNU	(2)	vs. (5) Montana State; Championship	W 65–55	16–7	Idaho Central Arena; Boise, Idaho
NCAA tournament
March 20, 2021*; 10:15 am, TBS	(14 W)	vs. (3 W) No. 12 Kansas; First Round	L 84–93	16–8	Indiana Farmers Coliseum; Indianapolis, IN
*Non-conference game. ^{#}Rankings from AP poll. (#) Tournament seedings in parentheses. W=West. All times are in Pacific time.
