= 2020–21 Weber State Wildcats men's basketball team =

American college basketball season

2020–21 Weber State Wildcats men's basketball
- Conference: Big Sky Conference
- Record: 17–6 (12–3 Big Sky)
- Head coach: Randy Rahe (15th season)
- Associate head coach: Eric Duft
- Assistant coaches: David Marek; Eric Daniels
- Home arena: Dee Events Center

2020–21 Big Sky men's basketball standings
	Conf.				Overall
Team	W		L	PCT	W		L	PCT
Southern Utah	12	–	2	.857	20	–	4	.833
Weber State	12	–	3	.800	17	–	6	.739
Eastern Washington†	12	–	3	.800	16	–	8	.667
Montana State	8	–	6	.571	13	–	10	.565
Idaho State	8	–	6	.571	13	–	11	.542
Montana	7	–	9	.438	15	–	13	.536
Northern Colorado	6	–	8	.429	11	–	11	.500
Portland State	6	–	8	.429	9	–	13	.409
Sacramento State	5	–	9	.357	8	–	12	.400
Northern Arizona	4	–	10	.286	6	–	16	.273
Idaho	1	–	17	.056	1	–	21	.045
† Conference tournament winner

The 2020–21 Weber State Wildcats men's basketball team represented Weber State University in the 2020–21 NCAA Division I men's basketball season. The Wildcats, led by 15th-year head coach Randy Rahe, played their home games at the Dee Events Center in Ogden, Utah, as members of the Big Sky Conference. In a season limited due to the ongoing COVID-19 pandemic, they finished the season 17–6, 12–3 in Big Sky play to finish a tie for second place. As the No. 3 seed in the Big Sky tournament, they lost in the quarterfinals to Montana.

== Previous season ==
The Wildcats finished the 2019–20 season 12–20, 8–12 in Big Sky play to finish in a tie for eighth place. As the No. 9 seed in the Big Sky tournament, they lost in the first round to Sacramento State.

== Roster ==
2020–21 Weber State Wildcats men's basketball team
Players
Coaches

Pos.	#	Name	Height	Weight	Year	Previous school	Hometown
G/F	0	Zahir Porter	6 ft 6 in (1.98 m)	180 lb (82 kg)	Jr	Independence Community College	Bronx, New York
F	2	Dillon Jones	6 ft 6 in (1.98 m)	235 lb (107 kg)	Fr	Sunrise Christian Prep	Columbia, South Carolina
G	3	KJ Cunningham	6 ft 2 in (1.88 m)	190 lb (86 kg)	So	Rudder High School	Bryan, Texas
G/F	4	Tavian Percy	6 ft 5 in (1.96 m)	200 lb (91 kg)	Jr	New Mexico	Miami, Florida
G	5	Seikou Sisoho Jawara	6 ft 3 in (1.91 m)	195 lb (88 kg)	So	Loyola Marymount	Mataró, Spain
G	10	Kham Davis	6 ft 4 in (1.93 m)	200 lb (91 kg)	Sr	Pittsburgh	Denver, Colorado
F	11	Michal Kozak	6 ft 8 in (2.03 m)	215 lb (98 kg)	Sr	Get Better Academy	Plzeň, Czech Republic
G	12	Isiah Brown	6 ft 2 in (1.88 m)	185 lb (84 kg)	Sr	Grand Canyon	Seattle, Washington
F	13	Donatas Kupsas	6 ft 8 in (2.03 m)	210 lb (95 kg)	So	Long Island Lutheran High School	Joniškis, Lithuania
G	14	Josh Sanders	6 ft 2 in (1.88 m)	180 lb (82 kg)	Fr	Davis High School	Kaysville, Utah
F/C	15	David Nzekwesi	6 ft 9 in (2.06 m)	240 lb (109 kg)	Jr	Denver	The Hague, Netherlands
C	21	Dontay Bassett	6 ft 9 in (2.06 m)	245 lb (111 kg)	Sr	Florida	Oakland, California
G	23	Hunter Humphreys	5 ft 10 in (1.78 m)	170 lb (77 kg)	Fr	Alta High School	Sandy, Utah
G	24	Darweshi Hunter	6 ft 5 in (1.96 m)	180 lb (82 kg)	So	Central State	Cincinnati, Ohio
F	25	Jake Furgerson	6 ft 7 in (2.01 m)	210 lb (95 kg)	So	Notre Dame de Namur	Star, Idaho
F/C	34	Cody Carlson	6 ft 10 in (2.08 m)	230 lb (104 kg)	Sr	Concordia St. Paul	Duluth, Minnesota
F/C	50	Mitch Brizee	6 ft 9 in (2.06 m)	225 lb (102 kg)	RS Fr	Twin Falls High School	Twin Falls, Idaho

Head coach

- Randy Rahe (Buena Vista)

Assistant coach(es)

- Eric Duft (Sterling (KS))
- David Marek (Southern Utah)
- Eric Daniels (Johnson & Wales)

Legend

- (C) Team captain
- (S) Suspended
- (I) Ineligible
- (W) Walk-on
- Injured
- Current redshirt

Roster
Last update: November 30, 2020

== Schedule and results ==
Date time, TV	Rank^{#}	Opponent^{#}	Result	Record	Site (attendance) city, state
Regular season
November 25, 2020*; 7:00 pm, Pluto TV		Adams State	W 88–60	1–0	Dee Events Center; Ogden, UT
November 28, 2020*; 2:00 pm, WAC DN		at Dixie State	Canceled		Burns Arena; St. George, UT
December 8, 2020*; 7:00 pm, Pluto TV		Westminster	W 85–73	2–0	Dee Events Center; Ogden, UT
December 12, 2020*; TBA, Pluto TV		Utah State	Canceled due to COVID-19 issues		Dee Events Center; Ogden, UT
December 13, 2020*; 2:00 pm		at Boise State	L 59–70	2–1	ExtraMile Arena; Boise, ID
December 18, 2020; 8:00 pm, Pluto TV		at Portland State	W 94–66	3–1 (1–0)	Viking Pavilion; Portland, OR
December 20, 2020; 1:00 pm, Pluto TV		at Portland State	L 72–74	3–2 (1–1)	Viking Pavilion; Portland, OR
December 23, 2020*; TBA, BYUtv		vs. BYU	L 79–87	3–3	Vivint Smart Home Arena; Salt Lake City, UT
December 31, 2020; TBA, Pluto TV		at Idaho State	Canceled		Reed Gym; Pocatello, ID
January 2, 2021; TBA, Pluto TV		Idaho State	Canceled		Dee Events Center; Ogden, UT
January 2, 2021*; 2:30 pm, Pluto TV		Utah Valley	W 70–62	4–3	Dee Events Center; Ogden, UT
January 7, 2021; 7:00 pm, Pluto TV		Eastern Washington	Canceled		Dee Events Center; Ogden, UT
January 9, 2021; 12:00 pm, Pluto TV		Eastern Washington	Canceled		Dee Events Center; Ogden, UT
January 16, 2021*; 2:00 pm, Pluto TV		Yellowstone Christian	W 124–44	5–3	Dee Events Center; Ogden, UT
January 17, 2021*; 7:00 pm, Pluto TV		Tarleton State	W 94–79	6–3	Dee Events Center; Ogden, UT
January 21, 2021; 7:00 pm, Pluto TV		Southern Utah	W 91–67	7–3 (2–1)	Dee Events Center; Ogden, UT
January 23, 2021; 12:00 pm, Pluto TV		at Southern Utah	L 72–77	7–4 (2–2)	America First Event Center (689); Cedar City, UT
January 28, 2021; 7:00 pm, PLuto TV		at Idaho	W 81–56	8–4 (3–2)	Cowan Spectrum; Moscow, ID
January 30, 2021; 1:00 pm, Pluto TV		at Idaho	W 81–62	9–4 (4–2)	Cowan Spectrum; Moscow, ID
February 4, 2021; 7:00 pm, Pluto TV		Montana State	W 96–88	10–4 (5–2)	Dee Events Center (810); Ogden, UT
February 6, 2021; 12:00 pm, Pluto TV		Montana State	W 82–74	11–4 (6–2)	Dee Events Center (844); Ogden, UT
February 11, 2021; 5:00 pm, Pluto TV		at Montana	L 67-80	11-5 (6-3)	Dahlberg Arena; Missoula, MT
February 13, 2021; 12:00 pm, Pluto TV		at Montana	W 91–82	12–5 (7–3)	Dahlberg Arena; Missoula, MT
February 18, 2021; 7:00 pm, Pluto TV		Northern Arizona	W 92–59	13–5 (8–3)	Dee Events Center (879); Ogden, UT
February 20, 2021; 12:00 pm, Pluto TV		Northern Arizona	W 74–52	14–5 (9–3)	Dee Events Center (1,021); Ogden, UT
February 25, 2021; 6:00 pm, Pluto TV		at Sacramento State	W 82–73	15–5 (10–3)	Hornets Nest; Sacramento, CA
February 27, 2021; 12:00 pm, Pluto TV		at Sacramento State	W 72–70	16–5 (11–3)	Hornets Nest; Sacramento, CA
March 4, 2021; 7:00 pm, Pluto TV		Northern Colorado	W 60–59	17–5 (12–3)	Dee Events Center; Ogden, UT
March 6, 2021; TBA, Pluto TV		Northern Colorado	Canceled		Dee Events Center; Ogden, UT
Big Sky tournament
March 11, 2021; 8:00 pm, Eleven	(3)	vs. (6) Montana; Quarterfinals	L 75–80	17–6	Idaho Central Arena; Boise, ID
*Non-conference game. ^{#}Rankings from AP Poll. (#) Tournament seedings in parentheses. All times are in Mountain.
