= 2020–21 Portland State Vikings men's basketball team =

American college basketball season

2020–21 Portland State Vikings men's basketball
- Conference: Big Sky Conference
- Record: 9–13 (6–8 Big Sky)
- Head coach: Barret Peery (4th season)
- Associate head coach: Jase Coburn
- Assistant coaches: Chris Skinkis; Scott Sommer
- Home arena: Viking Pavilion

2020–21 Big Sky men's basketball standings
| | Conf. | | | | Overall |
| Team | W | | L | PCT | W | | L | PCT |
|---|---|---|---|---|---|---|---|---|
| Southern Utah | 12 | – | 2 | .857 | 20 | – | 4 | .833 |
| Weber State | 12 | – | 3 | .800 | 17 | – | 6 | .739 |
| Eastern Washington† | 12 | – | 3 | .800 | 16 | – | 8 | .667 |
| Montana State | 8 | – | 6 | .571 | 13 | – | 10 | .565 |
| Idaho State | 8 | – | 6 | .571 | 13 | – | 11 | .542 |
| Montana | 7 | – | 9 | .438 | 15 | – | 13 | .536 |
| Northern Colorado | 6 | – | 8 | .429 | 11 | – | 11 | .500 |
| Portland State | 6 | – | 8 | .429 | 9 | – | 13 | .409 |
| Sacramento State | 5 | – | 9 | .357 | 8 | – | 12 | .400 |
| Northern Arizona | 4 | – | 10 | .286 | 6 | – | 16 | .273 |
| Idaho | 1 | – | 17 | .056 | 1 | – | 21 | .045 |
† Conference tournament winner

The 2020–21 Portland State Vikings men's basketball team represented Portland State University in the 2020–21 NCAA Division I men's basketball season. The Vikings, led by fourth-year head coach Barret Peery, played their home games at Viking Pavilion in Portland, Oregon as members of the Big Sky Conference. They finished the season 9-13, 6-8 in Big Sky Play to finish a tie for 7th place. They lost in the first round of the Big Sky tournament to Northern Arizona.

== Previous season ==
The Vikings finished the 2019–20 season 18–14, 12–8 Big Sky play to finish in fourth place. Due to the ongoing coronavirus pandemic, all postseason tournaments were canceled, including the Big Sky tournament.

== Roster ==
2020–21 Portland State Vikings men's basketball team
Players
Coaches

| Pos. | # | Name | Height | Weight | Year | Previous school | Hometown |
|---|---|---|---|---|---|---|---|
| G | 0 | Paris Dawson | 6 ft 2 in (1.88 m) | 165 lb (75 kg) | Fr | Centennial High School | Carson, California |
| C | 1 | Amari McCray | 6 ft 10 in (2.08 m) | 265 lb (120 kg) | GS | Pacific | Ruston, Louisiana |
| G | 2 | James Scott | 6 ft 5 in (1.96 m) | 190 lb (86 kg) | Sr | Temple | Union, New Jersey |
| G | 3 | Ian Burke | 6 ft 5 in (1.96 m) | 185 lb (84 kg) | Jr | Seattle | Phoenix, Arizona |
| G | 4 | Kyle Greeley | 6 ft 6 in (1.98 m) | 185 lb (84 kg) | So | West Salem High School | Salem, Oregon |
| G | 5 | Charles Jones | 6 ft 2 in (1.88 m) | 210 lb (95 kg) | Sr | Utah | Portland, Oregon |
| G | 10 | Elijah Hardy | 6 ft 2 in (1.88 m) | 170 lb (77 kg) | Jr | Washington | Oakland, California |
| F | 12 | Trey Wood | 6 ft 8 in (2.03 m) | 215 lb (98 kg) | So | Anthem Prep | Anthem, Arizona |
| G | 13 | Jaden Nielsen-Skinner | 5 ft 10 in (1.78 m) | 165 lb (75 kg) | RS Fr | South Salem High School | Salem, Oregon |
| G | 14 | Alexis Angeles | 6 ft 2 in (1.88 m) | 180 lb (82 kg) | Jr | Lower Columbia College | Tualatin, Oregon |
| G | 15 | Gio Nelson | 6 ft 5 in (1.96 m) | 200 lb (91 kg) | Jr | Arizona Western College | Riverside, California |
| F | 23 | Khalid Thomas | 6 ft 10 in (2.08 m) | 210 lb (95 kg) | GS | Arizona State | Salem, Oregon |
| G | 30 | Kiimani Holt | 6 ft 4 in (1.93 m) | 215 lb (98 kg) | Fr | PHH Prep | Phoenix, Arizona |
| C | 32 | Jacob Eyman | 6 ft 10 in (2.08 m) | 225 lb (102 kg) | So | Fullerton College | Los Alamitos, California |
| F | 35 | John Hall | 6 ft 7 in (2.01 m) | 220 lb (100 kg) | GS | Evansville | Philadelphia, Pennsylvania |

Head coach

- Barret Peery (Southern Utah)

Assistant coach(es)

- Jase Coburn (Arizona State)
- Chris Skinkis (UW–Parkside)
- Scott Sommer (Xavier)

Legend

- (C) Team captain
- (S) Suspended
- (I) Ineligible
- (W) Walk-on
- Injured
- Current redshirt

Roster
Last update: December 11, 2020

== Schedule and results ==
| Date time, TV | Rank^{#} | Opponent^{#} | Result | Record | Site (attendance) city, state |
Regular season
| December 5, 2020*; 7:00 pm | | at Portland | L 73–86 | 0–1 | Chiles Center; Portland, OR |
| December 8, 2020*; 7:05 pm | | Northwest | W 88–48 | 1–1 | Viking Pavilion (20); Portland, OR |
| December 13, 2020*; 2:00 pm, P12N | | at Washington State | L 60–69 | 1–2 | Beasley Coliseum; Pullman, WA |
| December 18, 2020; 7:05 pm, Pluto TV | | Weber State | L 66–94 | 1–3 (0–1) | Viking Pavilion; Portland, OR |
| December 20, 2020; 12:05 pm | | Weber State | W 74–72 | 2–3 (1–1) | Viking Pavilion; Portland, OR |
| December 22, 2020*; 5:00 pm, P12N | | at Oregon State | L 62–67 | 2–4 | Gill Coliseum; Corvallis, OR |
| December 31, 2020; 6:05 pm, Pluto TV | | at Eastern Washington | Canceled | | Reese Court; Cheney, WA |
| January 2, 2021; 12:00 pm, Pluto TV | | at Eastern Washington | Canceled | | Reese Court; Cheney, WA |
| January 7, 2021; 3:05 pm, Pluto TV | | at Sacramento State | Canceled | | Hornets Nest; Sacramento, CA |
| January 9, 2021; 12:05 pm, Pluto TV | | at Sacramento State | Canceled | | Hornets Nest; Sacramento, CA |
| January 9, 2021; 12:05 pm | | Northwest Nazarene | L 72–75 | 2–5 | Viking Pavilion; Portland, OR |
| January 14, 2021; 5:05 pm, Pluto TV | | at Montana State | L 64–71 | 2–6 (1–2) | Brick Breeden Fieldhouse; Bozeman, MT |
| January 16, 2021; 11:05 am, Pluto TV | | at Montana State | L 64–69 | 2–7 (1–3) | Brick Breeden Fieldhouse; Bozeman, MT |
| January 21, 2021; 7:05 pm, Pluto TV | | Idaho State | L 57–64 | 2–8 (1–4) | Viking Pavilion; Portland, OR |
| January 23, 2021; 12:05 pm, Pluto TV | | Idaho State | W 69–43 | 3–8 (2–4) | Viking Pavilion; Portland, OR |
| January 26, 2021*; 6:05 pm, Pluto TV | | Saint Martin's | W 69–60 | 4–8 | Viking Pavilion; Portland, OR |
| February 4, 2021; 7:05 pm, Pluto TV | | Montana | L 64–70 ^{OT} | 4–9 (2–5) | Viking Pavilion; Portland, OR |
| February 6, 2021; 12:05 pm, Pluto TV | | Montana | W 61–56 | 5–9 (3–5) | Viking Pavilion; Portland, OR |
| February 11, 2021; 5:00 pm, Pluto TV | | at Northern Arizona | Canceled | | Rolle Activity Center; Flagstaff, AZ |
| February 12, 2021*; 7:05 pm | | Simpson | W 99–66 | 6–9 | Viking Pavilion; Portland, OR |
| February 13, 2021; 11:00 am, Pluto TV | | at Northern Arizona | Canceled | | Rolle Activity Center; Flagstaff, AZ |
| February 18, 2021; 7:05 pm, Pluto TV | | Idaho | W 84–64 | 7–9 (4–5) | Viking Pavilion; Portland, OR |
| February 20, 2021; 12:05 pm, Pluto TV | | at Idaho | W 71–40 | 8–9 (5–5) | Memorial Gymnasium; Moscow, ID |
| February 25, 2021; 5:30 pm, Pluto TV | | at Northern Colorado | L 64–66 | 8–10 (5–6) | Bank of Colorado Arena (100); Greeley, CO |
| February 27, 2021; 11:05 am, Pluto TV | | at Northern Colorado | W 73–65 | 9–10 (6–6) | Bank of Colorado Arena (125); Greeley, CO |
| March 4, 2021; 7:05 pm, Pluto TV | | Southern Utah | L 58–68 | 9–11 (6–7) | Viking Pavilion; Portland, OR |
| March 6, 2021; 12:05 pm, Pluto TV | | Southern Utah | L 54–73 | 9–12 (6–8) | Viking Pavilion; Portland, OR |
Big Sky tournament
| March 10, 2021; 11:00 am | (7) | vs. (10) Northern Arizona; First Round | L 66–77 | 9–13 | Idaho Central Arena; Boise, ID |
*Non-conference game. ^{#}Rankings from AP Poll. (#) Tournament seedings in parentheses. All times are in Pacific.
