= Brian Katz =

American basketball coach (born 1957)

Biographical details
- Born: November 17, 1957 (age 68); Sacramento, California, U.S.
- Education: Sacramento State ('80)

Coaching career (HC unless noted)
- 1982–1983: Casa Roble HS
- 1983–1987: Center HS
- 1987–1989: Santa Clara (asst.)
- 1989–1993: Lassen CC
- 1993–2008: San Joaquin Delta CC
- 2008–2021: Sacramento State

Head coaching record
- Overall: 150–232 (.393)

Accomplishments and honors

Awards
- Big Sky Conference Co-Coach of the Year (2015); Hugh Durham Award (2015)

Brian Victor Katz (born November 15, 1957) is the former head men's basketball coach at Sacramento State. He graduated from Casa Roble High School, then Sacramento State in 1980. Katz came to Sacramento State after 19 years as a junior college head coach.

Katz was named Big Sky Conference Co-Coach of the year in 2015. He retired just prior to the start of the 2021–22 season due to a health issue. Associate head coach Brandon Laird became the interim coach.

== Head coaching record ==
The following table summarizes Katz's record as an NCAA head coach.

Record table
Season	Team	Overall	Conference	Standing	Postseason
Sacramento State Hornets (Big Sky Conference) (2008–2021)
2008–09	Sacramento State	2–27	1–15	9th	
2009–10	Sacramento State	9–21	3–13	9th	
2010–11	Sacramento State	7–21	4–12	T–8th	
2011–12	Sacramento State	10–18	5–11	T–7th	
2012–13	Sacramento State	14–15	8–12	T–6th	
2013–14	Sacramento State	14–16	10–10	T–7th	
2014–15	Sacramento State	21–12	13–5	T–3rd	CIT Second Round
2015–16	Sacramento State	14–17	6–12	10th	
2016–17	Sacramento State	13–18	9–9	7th	
2017–18	Sacramento State	7–25	4–14	11th	
2018–19	Sacramento State	15–16	8–12	T–8th	
2019–20	Sacramento State	16–14	8–12	T–8th	
2020–21	Sacramento State	8–12	5–9	9th	
Sacramento State:		150–232 (.393)	81–145 (.358)		
Total:		150–232 (.393)			
