= Barret Peery =

American basketball coach

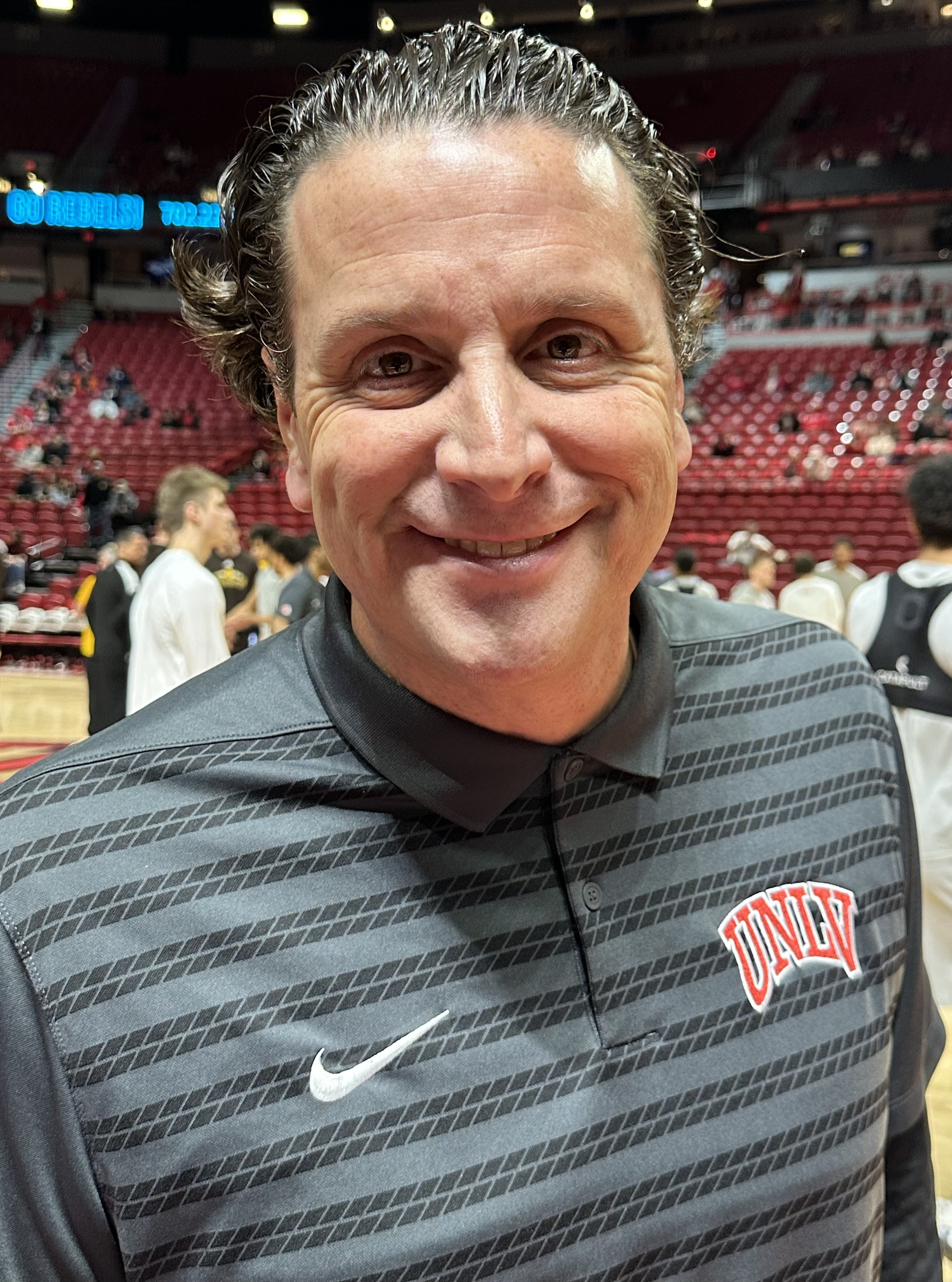
- Peery in 2025

Current position
- Title: Assistant coach
- Team: Utah State
- Conference: Pac-12

Biographical details
- Born: April 3, 1971 (age 55); Payson, Utah, U.S.

Playing career
- 1991–1993: Snow
- 1993–1995: Southern Utah

Coaching career (HC unless noted)
- 1995–1996: Southern Utah (asst.)
- 1996–1997: Snow College (asst.)
- 1997–1998: Utah Valley (asst.)
- 1998–2002: Southern Utah (asst.)
- 2002–2003: Portland State (asst.)
- 2003–2005: College of Southern Idaho (asst.)
- 2005–2008: College of Southern Idaho
- 2008–2011: Utah (asst.)
- 2011–2014: Indian Hills CC
- 2014–2015: Arizona State (asst.)
- 2016–2017: Santa Clara (assoc. HC)
- 2017–2021: Portland State
- 2021–2022: Texas Tech (assoc. HC)
- 2022–2025: UNLV (asst.)

2026–present

Head coaching record
- Overall: 244–86 (.739)

Barret Rex Peery (born April 3, 1971) is an American college basketball coach and current assistant coach at Utah State. He was formerly the head coach at Portland State.

== Playing career ==
Peery played college basketball at Snow College for two seasons before transferring to Southern Utah, where he was a part of two American West Conference championship squads.

== Coaching career ==
After graduation, Peery assisted at Southern Utah for one season before returning to Snow College for another season as an assistant coach. After a stop at Utah Valley, Peery returned as an assistant at Southern Utah before taking an assistant coaching position at Portland State from 2002 to 2003. Peery then served as an assistant coach at College of Southern Idaho from 2003 to 2005 under Gib Arnold, before taking over as the head coach from 2005 to 2008. In that time, Peery compiled an 85-19 record and was a two-time NJCAA Region 18 Coach of the Year, while also making the NCJAA National Tournament semifinals during the 2006–07 season. In 2008, Peery moved back to the NCAA Division I ranks to join Jim Boylen's staff at Utah where he stayed until 2011, before heading to Indian Hills Community College as head coach, and led them to a 93-11 record in three seasons. Peery joined Herb Sendek's staff at Arizona State in 2014, and rejoined Sendek again at Santa Clara before being named the head coach at Portland State.

== Head coaching record ==
=== NJCAA ===
Record table
Season	Team	Overall	Conference	Standing	Postseason
Southern Idaho Golden Eagles (Scenic West Athletic Conference) (2005–2008)
2005–06	Southern Idaho	25–10	13–5	T–1st	NCJAA Division I National Tournament
2006–07	Southern Idaho	30–7	15–5	T–1st	NCJAA Division I National Tournament Semifinals
2007–08	Southern Idaho	30–2	14–1	1st	
Southern Idaho:		85–19 (.817)	42–11 (.792)		
Indian Hills Warriors (Iowa Community College Athletic Conference) (2011–2014)
2011–12	Indian Hills	35–3	4–0	1st	NCJAA Division I National Tournament
2012–13	Indian Hills	27–4	7–1	1st	
2013–14	Indian Hills	34–3	7–1	1st	NCJAA Division I National Runner-Up
Indian Hills:		96–10 (.906)	18–2 (.900)		
Total:		181–29 (.862)			
National champion Postseason invitational champion Conference regular season champion Conference regular season and conference tournament champion Division regular season champion Division regular season and conference tournament champion Conference tournament champion

=== NCAA D1 ===
Record table
Season	Team	Overall	Conference	Standing	Postseason
Portland State Vikings (Big Sky Conference) (2017–2021)
2017–18	Portland State	20–14	9–9	T–6th	CIT Second Round
2018–19	Portland State	16–16	11–9	T–4th	
2019–20	Portland State	18–14	12–8	4th	
2020–21	Portland State	9–13	6–8	8th	
Portland State:		63–57 (.525)	38–34 (.528)		
Total:		63–57 (.525)			
National champion Postseason invitational champion Conference regular season champion Conference regular season and conference tournament champion Division regular season champion Division regular season and conference tournament champion Conference tournament champion
