= 2020–21 Southern Utah Thunderbirds men's basketball team =

American college basketball season

2020–21 Southern Utah Thunderbirds men's basketball

Big Sky regular season champions
- Conference: Big Sky Conference
- Record: 20–4 (12–2 Big Sky)
- Head coach: Todd Simon (5th season)
- Associate head coach: John Wardenburg
- Assistant coaches: Chris Pompey; Flynn Clayman
- Home arena: America First Event Center

2020–21 Big Sky men's basketball standings
	Conf.				Overall
Team	W		L	PCT	W		L	PCT
Southern Utah	12	–	2	.857	20	–	4	.833
Weber State	12	–	3	.800	17	–	6	.739
Eastern Washington†	12	–	3	.800	16	–	8	.667
Montana State	8	–	6	.571	13	–	10	.565
Idaho State	8	–	6	.571	13	–	11	.542
Montana	7	–	9	.438	15	–	13	.536
Northern Colorado	6	–	8	.429	11	–	11	.500
Portland State	6	–	8	.429	9	–	13	.409
Sacramento State	5	–	9	.357	8	–	12	.400
Northern Arizona	4	–	10	.286	6	–	16	.273
Idaho	1	–	17	.056	1	–	21	.045
† Conference tournament winner

The 2020–21 Southern Utah Thunderbirds men's basketball team represented Southern Utah University in the 2020–21 NCAA Division I men's basketball season. The Thunderbirds, led by 5th-year head coach Todd Simon, played their home games at the America First Event Center in Cedar City, Utah as members of the Big Sky Conference. They finished the season 20-4, 12-2 in Big Sky Play to finish as regular season champions. They defeated Northern Colorado in the quarterfinals of the Big Sky tournament before losing in the semifinals to Montana State.

== Previous season ==
The Thunderbirds finished the 2019–20 season 17–15, 9–11 in Big Sky play to finish in seventh place. They received the #7 seed in the Big Sky tournament, were they defeated the #10 seed Idaho in the first round 75–69. They were scheduled to face off against the #2 seed Northern Colorado in the quarterfinals, but the remainder of the tournament was cancelled due to the ongoing COVID-19 pandemic.

== Roster ==
2020–21 Southern Utah Thunderbirds men's basketball team
Players
Coaches

Pos.	#	Name	Height	Weight	Year	Previous school	Hometown
G	0	Damani McEntire	6 ft 4 in (1.93 m)	190 lb (86 kg)	So	Hargrave Military Academy	Indianapolis, Indiana
G	1	Nick Fleming	6 ft 1 in (1.85 m)	165 lb (75 kg)	Jr	Highland Community College	Atlanta, Georgia
G	2	Aanen Moody	6 ft 3 in (1.91 m)	165 lb (75 kg)	RS Jr	North Dakota	Dickinson, North Dakota
G	3	John Knight III	6 ft 3 in (1.91 m)	205 lb (93 kg)	Sr	Utah State	Jackson, Mississippi
G	4	Dre Marin	6 ft 0 in (1.83 m)	175 lb (79 kg)	Sr	Apollo High School	Glendale, Arizona
G	5	Tevian Jones	6 ft 7 in (2.01 m)	190 lb (86 kg)	Jr	Illinois	Chandler, Arizona
F	12	Maizen Fausett	6 ft 6 in (1.98 m)	225 lb (102 kg)	Jr	Westlake High School	Saratoga Springs, Utah
G	13	Darnell Latham Jr.	6 ft 2 in (1.88 m)	160 lb (73 kg)	Sr	Lincoln College	Chicago, Illinois
C	14	Jason Spurgin	6 ft 11 in (2.11 m)	225 lb (102 kg)	Fr	Toowoomba Grammar School	Toowoomba, Australia
G	15	Harrison Butler	6 ft 5 in (1.96 m)	230 lb (104 kg)	Jr	Mater Dei High School	Santa Ana, California
G	21	Kingsley Box	6 ft 5 in (1.96 m)	181 lb (82 kg)	Fr	Flinders College	Melbourne, Australia
F/C	22	Ivan Madunic	6 ft 11 in (2.11 m)	230 lb (104 kg)	RS Sr	DME Academy	Split, Croatia
F	23	Courtese Cooper	6 ft 9 in (2.06 m)	220 lb (100 kg)	RS Jr	LSU	Elgin, Illinois
G	25	Dee Barnes	6 ft 4 in (1.93 m)	180 lb (82 kg)	Jr	Mount St. Mary's	Great Mills, Maryland
G/F	30	Marquis Moore	6 ft 6 in (1.98 m)	205 lb (93 kg)	Jr	Detroit Mercy	Los Angeles, California
G	33	Martel Williams	6 ft 3 in (1.91 m)	200 lb (91 kg)	Fr	Middlebrooks Academy	Las Vegas, Nevada

Head coach

- Todd Simon (UNLV)

Assistant coach(es)

- John Wardenburg (BYU)
- Chris Pompey (Pittsburgh)
- Flynn Clayman (Troy)

Legend

- (C) Team captain
- (S) Suspended
- (I) Ineligible
- (W) Walk-on
- Injured
- Current redshirt

Roster
Last update: December 9, 2020

== Schedule and results ==
Date time, TV	Rank^{#}	Opponent^{#}	Result	Record	Site (attendance) city, state
Regular season
November 25, 2020*; 5:00 pm		at Loyola Marymount	L 83–85	0–1	Gersten Pavilion; Los Angeles, CA
November 28, 2020*; 1:00 pm, Pluto TV		Saint Katherine	W 95–47	1–1	America First Event Center; Cedar City, UT
December 3, 2020; 7:00 pm, Pluto TV		Montana	W 64–63	2–1 (1–0)	America First Event Center; Cedar City, UT
December 5, 2020; 12:00 pm, Pluto TV		Montana	W 75–74	3–1 (2–0)	America First Event Center; Cedar City, UT
December 9, 2020*; 6:00 pm		at Utah Valley	W 81–71	4–1	UCCU Center; Orem, UT
December 17, 2020*; 7:00 pm, Pluto TV		Dixie State	W 85–78	5–1	America First Event Center; Cedar City, UT
December 18, 2020*; 7:00 pm, Pluto TV		Bethesda	W 98–64	6–1	America First Event Center; Cedar City, UT
December 21, 2020*; 12:00 pm, Pluto TV		Bethesda	W 96–57	7–1	America First Event Center; Cedar City, UT
January 7, 2021; 7:00 pm, Pluto TV		Idaho	W 85–80	8–1 (3–0)	America First Event Center; Cedar City, UT
January 9, 2021; 12:00 pm, Pluto TV		Idaho	W 83–67	9–1 (4–0)	America First Event Center; Cedar City, UT
January 14, 2021; 7:00 pm, Pluto TV		at Eastern Washington	L 63–75	9–2 (4–1)	Reese Court; Cheney, WA
January 16, 2021; 1:00 pm, Pluto TV		at Eastern Washington	W 99–94	10–2 (5–1)	Reese Court; Cheney, WA
January 21, 2021; 7:00 pm, Pluto TV		at Weber State	L 67–91	10–3 (5–2)	Dee Events Center; Ogden, UT
January 23, 2021; 12:00 pm, Pluto TV		Weber State	W 77–72	11–3 (6–2)	America First Event Center (689); Cedar City, UT
February 4, 2021; 7:00 pm, Pluto TV		Northern Colorado	Canceled		America First Event Center; Cedar City, UT
February 6, 2021; 12:00 pm, Pluto TV		Northern Colorado	Canceled		America First Event Center; Cedar City, UT
February 6, 2021*; 12:00 pm, Pluto TV		Benedictine Mesa	W 110–58	12–3	America First Event Center (456); Cedar City, UT
February 9, 2021*; 2:00 pm, Pluto TV		San Diego Christian	W 109–50	13–3	America First Event Center (200); Cedar City, UT
February 18, 2021; 7:00 pm, Pluto TV		Sacramento State	W 88–69	14–3 (7–2)	America First Event Center (946); Cedar City, UT
February 20, 2021; 12:00 pm, Pluto TV		Sacramento State	W 77–57	15–3 (8–2)	America First Event Center (665); Cedar City, UT
February 24, 2021; 7:00 pm, Pluto TV		Northern Arizona	W 85–80	16–3 (9–2)	America First Event Center (944); Cedar City, UT
February 26, 2021; 12:00 pm, Pluto TV		at Northern Arizona	W 92–62	17–3 (10–2)	Rolle Activity Center (0); Flagstaff, AZ
March 4, 2021; 8:00 pm, Pluto TV		at Portland State	W 68–58	18–3 (11–2)	Viking Pavilion (0); Portland, OR
March 6, 2021; 1:00 pm, Pluto TV		at Portland State	W 73–54	19–3 (12–2)	Viking Pavilion (0); Portland, OR
Big Sky tournament
March 11, 2021; 11:00 am, Eleven	(1)	vs. (8) Northern Colorado; Quarterfinals	W 91–83	20–3	Idaho Central Arena; Boise, ID
March 12, 2021; 5:00 pm, Eleven	(1)	vs. (5) Montana State; Semifinals	L 77–80	20–4	Idaho Central Arena; Boise, ID
*Non-conference game. ^{#}Rankings from AP Poll. (#) Tournament seedings in parentheses. All times are in Mountain.
