= 2021 Big Sky Conference men's basketball tournament =

- Classification: Division I
- Season: 2020–21
- Teams: 11
- Site: Idaho Central Arena; Boise, Idaho
- Champions: Eastern Washington (3rd title)
- Winning coach: Shantay Legans (1st title)
- MVP: Tanner Groves (Eastern Washington)
- Television: Pluto TV, ESPNU (final)

2020–21 Big Sky men's basketball standings
	Conf.				Overall
Team	W		L	PCT	W		L	PCT
Southern Utah	12	–	2	.857	20	–	4	.833
Weber State	12	–	3	.800	17	–	6	.739
Eastern Washington†	12	–	3	.800	16	–	8	.667
Montana State	8	–	6	.571	13	–	10	.565
Idaho State	8	–	6	.571	13	–	11	.542
Montana	7	–	9	.438	15	–	13	.536
Northern Colorado	6	–	8	.429	11	–	11	.500
Portland State	6	–	8	.429	9	–	13	.409
Sacramento State	5	–	9	.357	8	–	12	.400
Northern Arizona	4	–	10	.286	6	–	16	.273
Idaho	1	–	17	.056	1	–	21	.045
† Conference tournament winner

The 2021 Big Sky Conference men's basketball tournament was the postseason tournament for the Big Sky Conference, held March 10–13 at Idaho Central Arena in Boise, Idaho. It was the 46th edition of the tournament, which debuted in 1976.

== Seeds ==
The eleven teams were seeded by conference record, with a tiebreaker system for identical conference records. The top five teams received a first-round bye.

Seed	School	Record	Tiebreaker 1
1	Southern Utah	12–2	
2	Eastern Washington	12–3	2–0 vs. Montana
3	Weber State	12–3	1–1 vs. Montana
4	Idaho State	8–6	1–1 vs. E. Washington
5	Montana State	8–6	0–2 vs. E. Washington
6	Montana	7–9	
7	Portland State	6–8	1–1 vs. Weber State
8	Northern Colorado	6–8	0–1 vs. Weber State
9	Sacramento State	5–9	
10	Northern Arizona	4–10	
11	Idaho	1–17	

== Schedule ==
Session	Game	Time	Matchup	Score	Television	Attendance
First round – Wednesday, March 10
1	1	9:30 am	No. 8 Northern Colorado vs. No. 9 Sacramento State	90–83	Pluto TV 1050	
1	2	12:00 pm	No. 7 Portland State vs. No. 10 Northern Arizona	66–77	Pluto TV 1050	
1	3	2:30 pm	No. 6 Montana vs. No. 11 Idaho	69–64	Pluto TV 1050	
Quarterfinals – Thursday, March 11
2	4	12:00 pm	No. 1 Southern Utah vs. No. 8 Northern Colorado	91–83	Pluto TV 1050	
2	5	2:30 pm	No. 4 Idaho State vs. No. 5 Montana State	63–71	Pluto TV 1050	
3	6	5:30 pm	No. 2 Eastern Washington vs. No. 10 Northern Arizona	66–60	Pluto TV 1050	
3	7	8:00 pm	No. 3 Weber State vs. No. 6 Montana	75–80	Pluto TV 1050	
Semifinals – Friday, March 12
4	8	5:30 pm	No. 1 Southern Utah vs. No. 5 Montana State	77–80^{OT}	Pluto TV 1050	
4	9	8:00 pm	No. 2 Eastern Washington vs. No. 6 Montana	78–50	Pluto TV 1050	
Championship game – Saturday, March 13
5	10	6:00 pm	No. 2 Eastern Washington vs. No. 5 Montana State	65–55	ESPNU	
Game times in MT. Rankings denote tournament seeding.

== Bracket ==
First round Wednesday, March 10
8	Northern Colorado	90
9	Sacramento State	83
7	Portland State	66
10	Northern Arizona	77
6	Montana	69
11	Idaho	64

Quarterfinals; Thursday, March 11
1	Southern Utah	91
8	Northern Colorado	83
4	Idaho State	63
5	Montana State	71
2	Eastern Washington	66
10	Northern Arizona	60
3	Weber State	75
6	Montana	80

Semifinals; Friday, March 12
1	Southern Utah	77
5	Montana State	80*
2	Eastern Washington	78
6	Montana	50

Championship; Saturday, March 13
5	Montana State	55
2	Eastern Washington	65
