= Zac Claus =

American basketball player and coach (born 1974)

Current position
- Title: Head Coach
- Team: Western Colorado Mountaineers
- Conference: RMAC

Biographical details
- Born: November 1974 (age 51); Lincoln, Nebraska, U.S.

Playing career
- 1993–1994: Creighton
- 1996–1998: Eastern Washington

Coaching career (HC unless noted)
- 1998–1999: Nebraska Wesleyan (JV/assistant)
- 1999–2000: Austin College (assistant)
- 2000–2002: Portland State (assistant)
- 2002–2005: Sacramento State (assistant)
- 2005–2015: Nevada (assistant)
- 2015–2019: Idaho (assistant)
- 2019–2023: Idaho
- 2023–present: Western Colorado

Head coaching record
- Overall: 28–89 (.239)

Zachary Arthur Claus (born November 1974) is an American basketball coach who is the head coach of the Western Colorado Mountaineers men’s basketball team.

== Playing career ==
Claus played college basketball at both Creighton and Eastern Washington. He also spent a year at Nebraska, but did not appear in any games for the team.

== Coaching career ==
After his playing career, Claus began coaching first at then-NAIA Nebraska Wesleyan as an assistant coach and junior varsity head coach. He moved on to Austin College before two assistant coaching stops in Division I at Portland State and Sacramento State. In 2005, Claus joined Mark Fox's staff at Nevada, where he'd stay for the next 10 seasons under both Fox and David Carter. In that span, the Wolf Pack captured three-straight WAC regular-season titles and made three appearances in the NCAA tournament.

After Carter's firing from Nevada, Claus joined Don Verlin's staff at Idaho. Verlin was placed on administrative leave and subsequently fired from Idaho after the school concluded he had committed NCAA violations, and the school named Claus the interim head coach in June 2019. On February 25, 2020, Idaho lifted the interim tag and gave Claus the full-time job.

Claus was fired on February 27, 2023, after Idaho finished the regular season 10–21. Claus had an overall 28–88 record in four seasons.

== Head coaching record ==
Record table
| Season | Team | Overall | Conference | Standing | Postseason |
|---|---|---|---|---|---|
Idaho Vandals (Big Sky Conference) (2019–2023)
| 2019–20 | Idaho | 8–24 | 4–16 | 11th | |
| 2020–21 | Idaho | 1–21 | 1–17 | 11th | |
| 2021–22 | Idaho | 9–22 | 6–14 | T–8th | |
| 2022–23 | Idaho | 10–21 | 4–14 | 10th | |
| Idaho: | | 28–88 (.241) | 15–61 (.197) | | |
| Total: | | 28–88 (.241) | | | |
National champion Postseason invitational champion Conference regular season champion Conference regular season and conference tournament champion Division regular season champion Division regular season and conference tournament champion Conference tournament champion
