= Brandon Laird (basketball) =

American men's basketball coach (born 1970s)

Current position
- Title: Associate head coach
- Team: Idaho
- Conference: Big Sky

Biographical details
- Education: UC Davis (2001)

Coaching career (HC unless noted)
- 2001–2002: El Camino Fundamental HS (asst.)
- 2002–2003: UC Davis (asst.)
- 2003–2006: Menlo (asst.)
- 2006–2009: Menlo
- 2009–2011: UC Davis (asst.)
- 2011–2021: Sacramento State (asst.)
- 2021–2022: Sacramento State (interim HC)
- 2023–present: Idaho (assoc. HC)

Head coaching record
- Overall: 52–59 (.468)

Brandon Laird (born 1970s) is an American men's basketball coach, currently the associate head coach at Idaho. He was previously the interim head coach of Sacramento State.

Laird attended El Camino Fundamental High School. He walked on to the basketball team at UC Davis in 1997 and played sparingly as a freshman. Laird helped the team win the 1998 NCAA Division II men's basketball tournament and earn two conference titles. During his junior season, he emerged as a three-point shooting threat.

Laird began his coaching career in 2001 as an assistant at El Camino Fundamental High School. In 2002, he was hired as an assistant coach at UC Davis. Laird joined the coaching staff at NAIA team Menlo College as an assistant in 2003. He was promoted to head coach in 2006. Laird posted a 41–41 record and helped the team win the California Pacific Conference Tournament and earn a berth in the NAIA Div. II Championships during the 2007–08 season In July 2009, he rejoined the staff at UC Davis. Laird was hired as an assistant at Sacramento State in 2011. He was promoted to associate head coach the following season. Laird helped the 2014–15 team finish with a record of 21–12 and reach the postseason for the first time in the Division 1 era.

Sacramento State head coach Brian Katz retired just prior to the start of the 2021–22 season due to a health issue. Laird became the interim coach. He took over with full support from the team, and guard Zach Chappell praised him as "a great leader".

== Head coaching record ==
Record table
| Season | Team | Overall | Conference | Standing | Postseason |
|---|---|---|---|---|---|
Sacramento State Hornets (Big Sky Conference) (2021–2022)
| 2021–22 | Sacramento State | 11–18 | 6–14 | T–8th | |
| Sacramento State: | | 11–18 (.379) | 6–14 (.300) | | |
| Total: | | 52–59 (.468) | | | |
