= Haldum =

Village in Denmark

Coordinates: 56°13′N 10°10′E

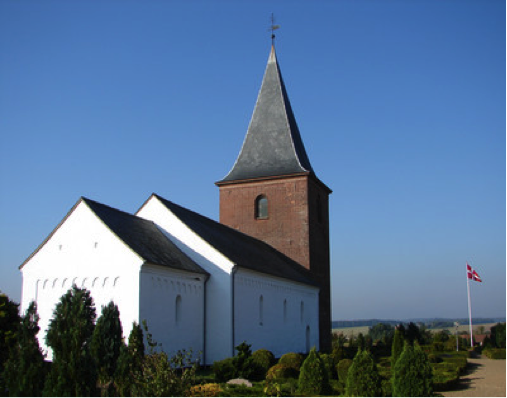
Outside view of the Haldum Church.

Haldum is a village within the Haldum parish of Favrskov Municipality, mid-Jutland in Denmark, 20 km northwest of Aarhus. The town is home to the medieval-era Haldum Church. In 2004, Haldum Church became known as an archaeological site when the Moesgård Museum conducted excavations in the area surrounding the churchyard, which yielded notable Viking Age and Early Medieval period findings.

== Haldum Church ==
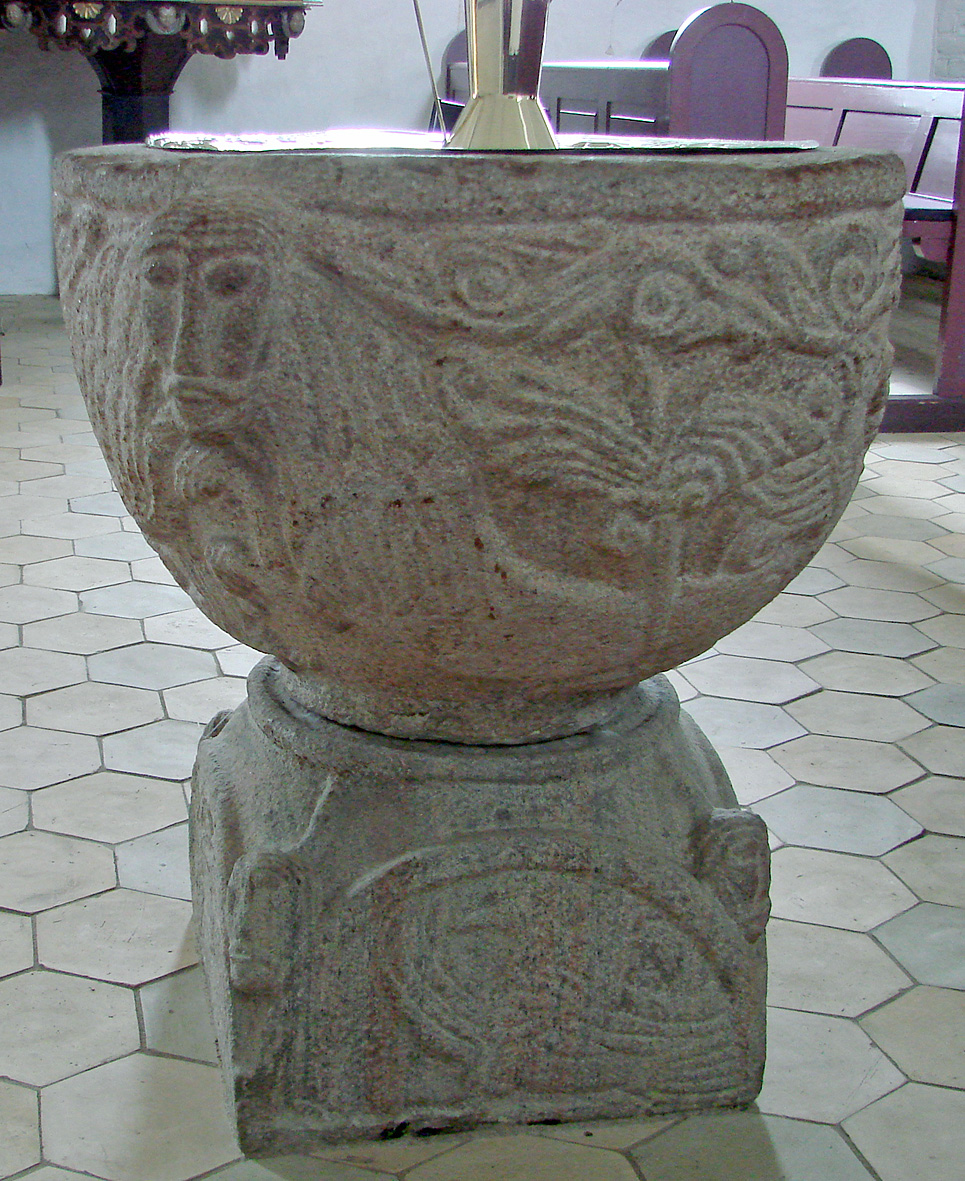
the church' granite baptismal font, with the basin just visible at the top

Haldum Church is a Romanesque style building constructed during the first half of the 12th century out of travertine limestone. The 1203 will of Bishop Peter Vognsen of Aarhus bequeathed the “church and manor” to the canons of the Aarhus cathedral. Since then, the church has been modified multiple times. Vaults over the chancel and naves were constructed in the late Middle Ages, and a tower was added. In 1865 Christen Kiilsgaard oversaw a complete renovation, and added the current spire.

The church bell is from the 14th century. The altarpiece in the church dates from 1599. The carved wooden pulpit was constructed in 1615. The church houses a baptismal font from the mid-16th century and is made of granite. The fonts brass basin was made in southern Germany around the same time.

== Moesgård Excavations ==
The Moesgård Museum, based near Aarhus, was given permission to excavate the site due to a road construction plan in 2004 and it was able to excavate the area near the churchyard of Haldum Church. During this excavation, archaeologists found 16 inhumation graves and five cremation graves from the late 10th century. Because no visible traces of Christian worship were found, the graves are assumed to be pagan.

The excavators from the Moesgård Museum unearthed a series of typical Viking Age grave goods, such as pottery and knives. They also found evidence suggesting that at least some of the graves belonged to members of the social elite. Two graves were chamber burials. In one of the chamber graves, excavators found a Jelling style bronze ornament. In addition to this finding, the archaeologists also discovered two caskets which had once been brilliantly ornamented.

On the southern end of the churchyard, a series of postholes indicates a 130-meter horizontal fence that predates the church. Although no further buildings have been found to have existed within the fence, its construction is speculated to have complemented the “church and manor” complex referred to by Vognesen in his will.

Haldum Church was constructed less than 200 years later on the same site as the Viking-age graves. Because churches were often built upon existing pagan sites where chieftains served religious functions, it is highly probable that Haldum had once been home to an aristocracy. It is more difficult, however, to determine whether the fence mentioned above reflects a link between a possible Viking aristocracy in the late 10th century and the builders of the church. Because one of the fence’s postholes had been placed inside a grave - a sign of disrespect in a family-oriented Viking Age culture - the church builders would probably have been strangers to the area.
