= Jubrile Belo =

British basketball player

No. 13 – Promitheas Patras
- Position: Power forward
- League: Greek Basketball League

Personal information
- Born: 27 June 1998 (age 28)
- Listed height: 6 ft 9 in (2.06 m)
- Listed weight: 240 lb (109 kg)

Career information
- High school: Havering College (London, England); Barking Abbey School (London, England)
- College: Lamar CC (2017–2019); Montana State (2019–2023)
- NBA draft: 2023: undrafted
- Playing career: 2023–present

Career history
- 2023–2025: Stade Rochelais Basket
- 2025–2026: Falco KC Szombathely
- 2026–present: Promitheas Patras

Career highlights
- Big Sky Player of the Year (2022); Big Sky Defensive Player of the Year (2022); First-team All-Big Sky (2022); Second-team All-Big Sky (2023); 2× Third-team All-Big Sky (2020, 2021); Big Sky Newcomer of the Year (2020)

Jubrile Izuhunwa Belo-Osagie (born 27 June 1998) is a British professional basketball player for Promitheas Patras of the Greek Basketball League. He played college basketball for the Montana State Bobcats and Lamar CC Runnin' Lopes.

== Early life ==
Belo grew up in London, England. In 2015, friends convinced him to try basketball. He attended Havering College for two years before opting for a prep year at Barking Abbey School. Belo averaged 8.6 points, nine rebounds, 1.1 steals and one block per game, helping Barking Abbey claim the 2017 EABL National Championship. He committed to playing college basketball at Lamar Community College in June 2017.

== College career ==
Belo redshirted his freshman season at Lamar after breaking his left tibia seven games into the season. As a redshirt freshman, he averaged 15 points, 8.8 rebounds, and 2.1 blocks per game, despite not being fully healthy. He committed to transfer to Montana State in November 2018. Belo averaged 13.1 points and 6.4 rebounds per game as a sophomore, shooting 61.2 percent from the floor. He was named to the Third Team All-Big Sky as well as Big Sky Newcomer of the Year. Belo was forced to quarantine shortly before his junior season due to COVID-19 protocols. On 6 March 2021, he scored a career-high 32 points in a 74–73 loss to Sacramento State. As a junior, Belo averaged 14 points and 5.9 rebounds per game. As a senior, Belo was named Big Sky Player of the Year, Big Sky Defensive Player of the Year and was unanimously selected to the First Team All-Big Sky. He averaged 12.8 points and 6.7 rebounds per game. Belo returned for an additional season granted by the NCAA due to the COVID-19 pandemic. In his final season, he averaged 12.8 points and 6.0 rebounds per game, earning Second Team All-Big Sky honors.

== Professional career ==
On 7 July 2023, Belo signed with Stade Rochelais Basket of the LNB Pro B.

On 15 July 2025 he signed with Falco KC Szombathely of the Hungarian Basketball League.

On 16 January 2026 he signed for Promitheas Patras of the Greek Basketball League.

== National team career ==
Belo represented Great Britain at the 2017 FIBA U20 European Championship Division B. He averaged 1.7 points and 2.1 rebounds per game.

== Career statistics ==
Legend
GP	Games played	GS	Games started	MPG	Minutes per game
FG%	Field goal percentage	3P%	3-point field goal percentage	FT%	Free throw percentage
RPG	Rebounds per game	APG	Assists per game	SPG	Steals per game
BPG	Blocks per game	PPG	Points per game	**Bold**	Career high

=== College ===
==== NCAA Division I ====
Year	Team	GP	GS	MPG	FG%	3P%	FT%	RPG	APG	SPG	BPG	PPG
2019–20	Montana State	31	31	26.2	.612	–	**.750**	6.4	.7	**.5**	1.2	13.1
2020–21	Montana State	23	23	25.3	**.618**	.000	.748	5.9	1.0	**.5**	1.3	**14.0**
2021–22	Montana State	**34**	**33**	**26.9**	.579	**.500**	.716	**6.7**	**1.1**	**.5**	**1.8**	12.8
Career		88	87	26.2	.601	.333	.736	6.4	.9	.5	1.4	13.2

==== JUCO ====
Year	Team	GP	GS	MPG	FG%	3P%	FT%	RPG	APG	SPG	BPG	PPG
2017–18	Lamar CC	7	4	14.1	.556	.000	**.765**	2.4	.6	**.4**	.4	4.7
2018–19	Lamar CC	**30**	**30**	**30.1**	**.617**	.000	.740	**8.8**	**1.3**	.2	**2.1**	**15.0**
Career		37	34	27.1	.613	.000	.742	7.6	1.1	.2	1.8	13.1
