= 2021–22 Idaho Vandals men's basketball team =

American college basketball season

2021–22 Idaho Vandals men's basketball
- Conference: Big Sky Conference
- Record: 9–22 (6–14 Big Sky)
- Head coach: Zac Claus (3rd season)
- Assistant coaches: Tim Marrion; Kenny Tripp; Johnny Hill
- Home arena: ICCU Arena

2021–22 Big Sky men's basketball standings
	Conf.				Overall
Team	W		L	PCT	W		L	PCT
Montana State †	16	–	4	.800	27	–	8	.771
Southern Utah	14	–	6	.700	23	–	12	.657
Northern Colorado	13	–	7	.650	22	–	16	.579
Weber State	13	–	7	.650	21	–	12	.636
Montana	11	–	9	.550	18	–	14	.563
Eastern Washington	11	–	9	.550	18	–	16	.529
Portland State	10	–	10	.500	14	–	17	.452
Sacramento State	6	–	14	.300	11	–	18	.379
Idaho	6	–	14	.300	9	–	22	.290
Idaho State	5	–	15	.250	7	–	23	.233
Northern Arizona	5	–	15	.250	9	–	23	.281
† Conference tournament winner

The 2021–22 Idaho Vandals men's basketball team represented the University of Idaho in the Big Sky Conference during the 2021–22 NCAA Division I men's basketball season. Led by third-year head coach Zac Claus, the Vandals played their home games on campus at the new Idaho Central Credit Union Arena in Moscow, Idaho.

== Previous season ==
The previous season had been intended to be the 46th and final season for basketball in the Kibbie Dome, configured as the "Cowan Spectrum" for basketball since February 2001. Due to the COVID-19 pandemic, the 2020 football season in the Big Sky was delayed until the spring of 2021. and home basketball games were moved to Memorial Gymnasium,

The Vandals finished the 2020–21 season with a 1–21 record (1–17 in Big Sky, last). In the conference tournament, they lost to Montana in the quarterfinals.

== Roster ==
2021–22 Idaho Vandals men's basketball team
Players
Coaches

Pos.	#	Name	Height	Weight	Year	Previous school	Hometown
F	0	Michael Hanshaw	6 ft 9 in (2.06 m)	215 lb (98 kg)	Jr	Westlake HS	Moorpark, CA
G	1	RJ Walker	6 ft 0 in (1.83 m)	164 lb (74 kg)	Fr	Decatur Eisenhower HS	Decatur, IL
G	2	Yusef Salih	6 ft 0 in (1.83 m)	175 lb (79 kg)	Fr	Highland School	Gainesville, VA
G	3	Mikey Dixon	6 ft 2 in (1.88 m)	165 lb (75 kg)	Sr	Grand Canyon	New Castle, DE
G	4	Trevante Anderson	6 ft 1 in (1.85 m)	180 lb (82 kg)	Jr	San Francisco	Tacoma, WA
G	5	JeMeil King	6 ft 5 in (1.96 m)	180 lb (82 kg)	Sr	Bellevue	Oakland, CA
G	10	Nolan Bertain	6 ft 3 in (1.91 m)	190 lb (86 kg)	Sr	Texas A&M–Corpus Christi	Portland, OR
G	11	Kendall McHugh	5 ft 11 in (1.8 m)	160 lb (73 kg)	So	College of Southern Idaho	Centreville, VA
F	15	Philip Pepple Jr.	6 ft 7 in (2.01 m)	240 lb (109 kg)	Jr	SIU Edwardsville	Shoreline, WA
G	20	Ethan Kilgore	6 ft 5 in (1.96 m)	210 lb (95 kg)	Fr	East Buchanan HS	Gower, MO
G	21	Gabe Quinnett	6 ft 4 in (1.93 m)	200 lb (91 kg)	So	Moscow HS	Moscow, ID
G	23	Rashad Smith	6 ft 4 in (1.93 m)	200 lb (91 kg)	Jr	Grand Canyon	Chandler, AZ
F	32	Tanner Christensen	6 ft 10 in (2.08 m)	260 lb (118 kg)	Fr	University HS	Spokane Valley, WA
G	33	Jack Hatten	6 ft 5 in (1.96 m)	185 lb (84 kg)	Fr	Garces Memorial HS	Bakersfield, CA

Head coach

- Zac Claus (Eastern Washington)

Assistant coach(es)

- Tim Marrion (Washington State)
- Kenny Tripp (Regis)
- Johnny Hill (Purdue)

Legend

- (C) Team captain
- (S) Suspended
- (I) Ineligible
- (W) Walk-on
- Injured
- Current redshirt

Roster
Last update: December 7, 2021

== Schedule and results ==
Date time, TV	Rank^{#}	Opponent^{#}	Result	Record	Site (attendance) city, state
Exhibition
October 29, 2021*; 6:00 pm		Evergreen State	W 73–56	–	ICCU Arena; Moscow, ID
November 4, 2021*; 6:00 pm		Yellowstone Christian	W 108–68	–	ICCU Arena; Moscow, ID
Regular season
November 10, 2021*; 6:00 pm, ESPN+		Long Beach State	L 89–95 ^{OT}	0–1	ICCU Arena (1,723); Moscow, ID
November 12, 2021*; 6:00 pm, ESPN+		George Fox	W 95–85	1–1	ICCU Arena (1,307); Moscow, ID
November 15, 2021*; 7:00 pm		at Fresno State; SoCal Challenge campus-site game	L 62–69	1–2	Save Mart Center (3,388); Fresno, CA
November 18, 2021*; 6:00 pm, ESPN+		Washington State; Battle of the Palouse	L 61–109	1–3	ICCU Arena (2,727); Moscow, ID
November 22, 2021*; 2:30 pm, FloHoops		vs. Utah Valley; SoCal Challenge Sand Division semifinals	L 45–83	1–4	The Pavilion at JSerra (317); San Juan Capistrano, CA
November 24, 2021*; 12:00 pm, FloHoops		vs. Cal Poly; SoCal Challenge Sand Division 3rd place game	L 63–67	1–5	The Pavilion at JSerra (1,700); San Juan Capistrano, CA
November 27, 2021*; 5:00 pm, ESPN+		at North Dakota State	L 73–90	1–6	Scheels Center (1,896); Fargo, ND
December 4, 2021; 2:00 pm, ESPN+		Southern Utah	L 75–81	1–7 (0–1)	ICCU Arena (1,043); Moscow, ID
December 8, 2021*; 6:00 pm, ESPN+		South Dakota State	W 98–84	2–7	ICCU Arena (1,051); Moscow, ID
December 11, 2021*; 7:00 pm, ESPN+		at Cal State Bakersfield	L 58–59	2–8	Icardo Center (899); Bakersfield, CA
December 18, 2021*; 2:00 pm, ESPN+		SAGU	W 84–55	3–8	ICCU Arena (1,105); Moscow, ID
December 22, 2021*; 7:00 pm, ESPN+		at UC Riverside	Canceled due to COVID-19 protocols		SRC Arena; Riverside, CA
January 6, 2022; 6:00 pm, ESPN+		Montana State	L 72–92	3–9 (0–2)	ICCU Arena (50); Moscow, ID
January 8, 2022; 3:30 pm, ESPN+		at Eastern Washington	L 93–96	3–10 (0–3)	Reese Court (1,351); Cheney, WA
January 13, 2022; 6:00 pm, ESPN+		at Weber State	L 74–84	3–11 (0–4)	Dee Events Center (2,822); Ogden, UT
January 15, 2022; 5:00 pm, ESPN+		at Idaho State; Battle of the Domes	L 74–81	3–12 (0–5)	Reed Gym (1,474); Pocatello, ID
January 17, 2022; 6:00 pm, ESPN+		at Northern Arizona; Rescheduled from December 30	L 72–74	3–13 (0–6)	Walkup Skydome (418); Flagstaff, AZ
January 20, 2022; 6:00 pm, ESPN+		Northern Colorado	L 70–87	3–14 (0–7)	ICCU Arena (1,069); Moscow, ID
January 22, 2022; 2:00 pm, ESPN+		Sacramento State	W 73–72 ^{OT}	4–14 (1–7)	ICCU Arena (1,134); Moscow, ID
January 24, 2022; 8:00 pm, ESPN+		at Portland State; Rescheduled from January 1	W 84–79	5–14 (2–7)	Viking Pavilion (563); Portland, OR
January 27, 2022; 6:00 pm, ESPN+		at Montana	L 62–81	5–15 (2–8)	Dahlberg Arena (3,014); Missoula, MT
January 29, 2022; 3:00 pm, ESPN+		at Montana State	L 62–70	5–16 (2–9)	Brick Breeden Fieldhouse (3,481); Bozeman, MT
February 3, 2022; 6:00 pm, ESPN+		at Southern Utah	L 59–75	5–17 (2–10)	America First Event Center (2,033); Cedar City, UT
February 10, 2022; 6:00 pm, ESPN+		Idaho State; Battle of the Domes	L 70–79	5–18 (2–11)	ICCU Arena (1,323); Moscow, ID
February 12, 2022; 2:00 pm, ESPN+		Weber State	W 83–79	6–18 (3–11)	ICCU Arena (1,059); Moscow, ID
February 17, 2022; 6:00 pm, ESPN+		Montana	W 82–76	7–18 (4–11)	ICCU Arena (1,310); Moscow, ID
February 19, 2022; 4:30 pm, ESPN+		Eastern Washington	W 83–80	8–18 (5–11)	ICCU Arena (2,230); Moscow, ID
February 24, 2022; 7:05 pm, ESPN+		at Sacramento State	L 51–83	8–19 (5–12)	Hornets Nest (565); Sacramento, CA
February 26, 2022; 5:00 pm, ESPN+		at Northern Colorado	L 94–98	8–20 (5–13)	Bank of Colorado Arena (1,421); Greeley, CO
March 3, 2022; 6:00 pm, ESPN+		Portland State	L 68–79	8–21 (5–14)	ICCU Arena (1,231); Moscow, ID
March 5, 2022; 2:00 pm, ESPN+		Northern Arizona	W 78–69	9–21 (6–14)	ICCU Arena (1,442); Moscow, ID
Big Sky tournament
March 9, 2022; 8:30 am, ESPN+	(9)	vs. (8) Sacramento State; First round	L 54–57	9–22	Idaho Central Arena; Boise, ID
*Non-conference game. ^{#}Rankings from AP Poll. (#) Tournament seedings in parentheses. All times are in Pacific.
