= 2021–22 Montana State Bobcats men's basketball team =

American college basketball season

2021–22 Montana State Bobcats men's basketball
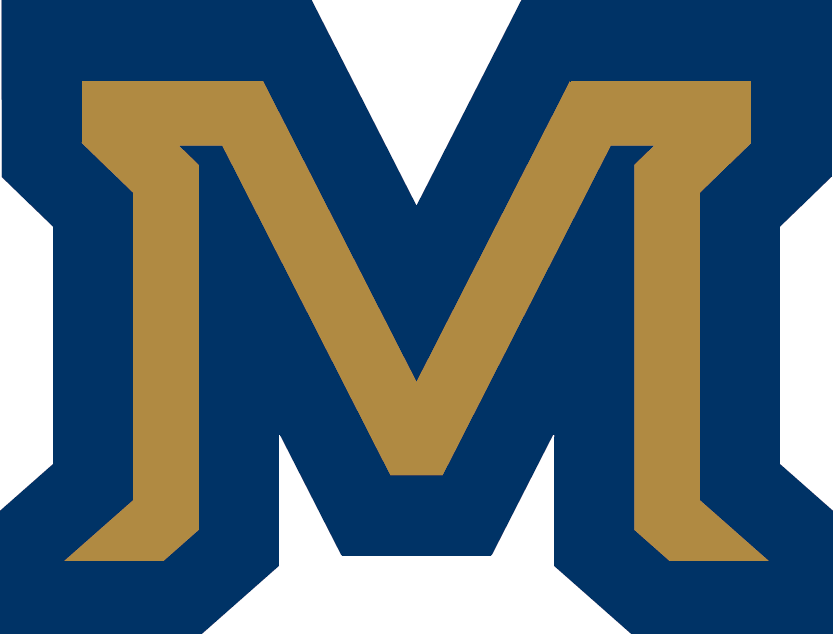

Big Sky regular season and tournament champions

NCAA tournament, First Round
- Conference: Big Sky Conference
- Record: 27–8 (16–4 Big Sky)
- Head coach: Danny Sprinkle (3rd season)
- Assistant coaches: Chris Haslam; Dan Russell; Ken Moses
- Home arena: Brick Breeden Fieldhouse

2021–22 Big Sky men's basketball standings
	Conf.				Overall
Team	W		L	PCT	W		L	PCT
Montana State †	16	–	4	.800	27	–	8	.771
Southern Utah	14	–	6	.700	23	–	12	.657
Northern Colorado	13	–	7	.650	22	–	16	.579
Weber State	13	–	7	.650	21	–	12	.636
Montana	11	–	9	.550	18	–	14	.563
Eastern Washington	11	–	9	.550	18	–	16	.529
Portland State	10	–	10	.500	14	–	17	.452
Sacramento State	6	–	14	.300	11	–	18	.379
Idaho	6	–	14	.300	9	–	22	.290
Idaho State	5	–	15	.250	7	–	23	.233
Northern Arizona	5	–	15	.250	9	–	23	.281
† Conference tournament winner

The 2021–22 Montana State Bobcats men's basketball team represented Montana State University in the 2021–22 NCAA Division I men's basketball season. The Bobcats, led by third-year head coach Danny Sprinkle, played their home games at Brick Breeden Fieldhouse in Bozeman, Montana as members of the Big Sky Conference. They finished the regular season 24–7, 16–4 in Big Sky play to win the Big Sky regular season championship. As the No. 1 seed in the Big Sky tournament, they defeated Sacramento State, Weber State, and Northern Colorado, to win the tournament, and earned the Big Sky's automatic bid to the NCAA tournament.

Given a No. 14 seed in the West Region of the NCAA Tournament, Montana State was defeated by Texas Tech in the first round.

== Previous season ==
In a season limited due to the ongoing COVID-19 pandemic, the Bobcats finished the 2020–21 season 13–10, 8–6 in Big Sky play to finish in a tie for fourth place. They defeated Idaho State and Southern Utah before losing to Eastern Washington in the championship of the Big Sky tournament.

== Roster ==
2021–22 Montana State Bobcats men's basketball team
Players
Coaches

Pos.	#	Name	Height	Weight	Year	Previous school	Hometown
G/F	0	Abdul Mohamed	6 ft 7 in (2.01 m)	205 lb (93 kg)	Sr	North Texas	Ottawa, ON
G	1	Xavier Bishop	5 ft 8 in (1.73 m)	165 lb (75 kg)	Sr	UMKC	Springfield, IL
G	2	Nick Gazelas	6 ft 4 in (1.93 m)	180 lb (82 kg)	So	Jacksonville College	Humble, TX
F	3	Great Osobor	6 ft 8 in (2.03 m)	245 lb (111 kg)	Fr	Myerscough College	Bradford, England
F	4	Alex Germer	6 ft 8 in (2.03 m)	190 lb (86 kg)	Fr	Sentinel HS	Missoula, MT
G	5	Amin Adamu	6 ft 5 in (1.96 m)	190 lb (86 kg)	Sr	Casper College	London, England
G	10	Patrick McMahon	6 ft 7 in (2.01 m)	190 lb (86 kg)	Fr	Colony HS	Palmer, AK
G	11	Tyler Patterson	6 ft 8 in (2.03 m)	190 lb (86 kg)	Fr	Mount Si HS	Snoqualmie, WA
F	13	Jubrile Belo	6 ft 9 in (2.06 m)	240 lb (109 kg)	Jr	Lamar CC	London, England
G	14	Carter Ash	6 ft 0 in (1.83 m)	165 lb (75 kg)	Fr	Bozeman HS	Bozeman, MT
G	15	Mareng Gatkuoth	6 ft 6 in (1.98 m)	180 lb (82 kg)	So	South Plains College	Anchorage, AK
G	20	Isaac Spears	6 ft 4 in (1.93 m)	170 lb (77 kg)	Fr	Bella Vista Prep	Las Vegas, NV
G	21	RaeQuan Battle	6 ft 5 in (1.96 m)	190 lb (86 kg)	So	Washington	Tulalip, WA
F	23	Borja Fernandez	6 ft 7 in (2.01 m)	230 lb (104 kg)	So	FC Barcelona U18	Bilbao, Spain
G	24	Kellen Tynes	6 ft 3 in (1.91 m)	175 lb (79 kg)	Fr	Rothesay Netherwood School	Dartmouth, NS
F	25	Sam Lecholat	6 ft 7 in (2.01 m)	215 lb (98 kg)	Fr	Sheridan HS	Sheridan, WY
C	44	Jasper Reinalda	7 ft 3 in (2.21 m)	275 lb (125 kg)	Fr	Donar Academy	Corvallis, OR

Head coach

- Danny Sprinkle (Montana State)

Assistant coach(es)

- Chris Haslam (Wyoming)
- Dan Russell (Wyoming)
- Ken Moses (CSU Pueblo)

Legend

- (C) Team captain
- (S) Suspended
- (I) Ineligible
- (W) Walk-on
- Injured
- Current redshirt

Roster
Last update: January 16, 2022

== Schedule and results ==
Date time, TV	Rank^{#}	Opponent^{#}	Result	Record	Site (attendance) city, state
Exhibition
October 25, 2021*; 7:00 pm		Providence (MT)	W 108–63	–	Brick Breeden Fieldhouse (1,713); Bozeman, MT
November 3, 2021*; 7:00 pm		Yellowstone Christian	W 116–42	–	Brick Breeden Fieldhouse; Bozeman, MT
Regular season
November 9, 2021*; 8:00 pm		at Colorado	L 90–94 ^{OT}	0–1	CU Events Center; Boulder, CO
November 14, 2021*; 2:00 pm		Rocky Mountain	W 81–52	1–1	Brick Breeden Fieldhouse; Bozeman, MT
November 17, 2021*; 6:00 pm		at South Dakota State	L 74–91	1–2	Frost Arena; Brookings, SD
November 20, 2021*; 2:00 pm		at New Mexico	L 78–81	1–3	The Pit; Albuquerque, NM
November 26, 2021*; 1:00 pm		vs. Portland; Cardinal Thanksgiving Invitational	W 69–66	2–3	McDermott Center; San Antonio, TX
November 27, 2021*; 10:30 am		at Incarnate Word; Cardinal Thanksgiving Invitational	W 83–64	3–3	McDermott Center; San Antonio, TX
November 28, 2021*; 11:00 am		vs. Southeast Missouri State; Cardinal Thanksgiving Invitational	W 75–68	4–3	McDermott Center; San Antonio, TX
December 2, 2021; 6:00 pm		at Northern Colorado	L 75–77 ^{OT}	4–4 (0–1)	Bank of Colorado Arena (1,191); Greeley, CO
December 4, 2021; 2:00 pm		at Sacramento State	W 68–66	5–4 (1–1)	Hornets Nest (372); Sacramento, CA
December 7, 2021*; 7:00 pm		at North Dakota State	W 68–49	6–4	Brick Breeden Fieldhouse (2,669); Bozeman, MT
December 11, 2021*; 6:00 pm		at St. Thomas (MN)	W 72–65	7–4	Schoenecker Arena (1,097); Saint Paul, MN
December 19, 2021*; 2:00 pm		Portland	W 61–59	8–4	Brick Breeden Fieldhouse (2,234); Bozeman, MT
December 22, 2021*; 7:00 pm		American Indian	W 124–73	9–4	Brick Breeden Fieldhouse (2,026); Bozeman, MT
December 30, 2021; 7:00 p.m., ESPN+		Weber State	L 75–85	9–5 (1–2)	Brick Breeden Fieldhouse (2,918); Bozeman, MT
January 1, 2022; 1:00 p.m., ESPN+		Idaho State	W 60–40	10–5 (2–2)	Brick Breeden Fieldhouse (2,200); Bozeman, MT
January 6, 2022; 7:00 p.m., ESPN+		at Idaho	W 92–72	11–5 (3–2)	Idaho Central Credit Union Arena (50); Moscow, ID
January 9, 2022; 7:00 p.m., ESPN+		Montana	W 66–59	12–5 (4–2)	Brick Breeden Fieldhouse (3,763); Bozeman, MT
January 20, 2022; 7:00 p.m., ESPN+		at Northern Arizona	W 89–84	13–5 (5–2)	Walkup Skydome (840); Flagstaff, AZ
January 22, 2022; 8:00 p.m., ESPN+		at Portland State	W 73–60	14–5 (6–2)	Viking Pavilion (1,496); Portland, OR
January 27, 2022; 7:00 p.m., ESPN+		Eastern Washington	W 69–65	15–5 (7–2)	Brick Breeden Fieldhouse (3,078); Bozeman, MT
January 29, 2022; 4:00 p.m., ESPN+		Idaho	W 70–64	16–5 (8–2)	Brick Breeden Fieldhouse (3,481); Bozeman, MT
February 5, 2022; 7:00 p.m., ESPN+		at Weber State	W 78–57	17–5 (9–2)	Dee Events Center (6,329); Ogden, UT
February 7, 2022; 7:00 p.m., ESPN+		at Idaho State; Rescheduled from February 7	W 72–54	18–5 (10–2)	Reed Gym (1,027); Pocatello, ID
February 10, 2022; 7:00 p.m., ESPN+		Portland State	W 77–74	19–5 (11–2)	Brick Breeden Fieldhouse (3,556); Bozeman, MT
February 12, 2022; 2:00 p.m., ESPN+		Northern Arizona	W 72–70	20–5 (12–2)	Brick Breeden Fieldhouse (3,803); Bozeman, MT
February 17, 2022; 7:00 p.m., ESPN+		at Eastern Washington	L 86–88 ^{OT}	20–6 (12–3)	Reese Court (1,216); Cheney, WA
February 19, 2022; 2:00 p.m., ESPN+		at Southern Utah	W 76–71	21–6 (13–3)	America First Event Center (1,360); Cedar City, UT
February 27, 2022; 3:00 p.m., ESPNU		at Montana	L 74–80	21–7 (13–4)	Dahlberg Arena (5,285); Missoula, MT
March 1, 2022; 4:00 p.m., ESPN+		Southern Utah; Rescheduled from January 15	W 69–53	22–7 (14–4)	Brick Breeden Fieldhouse (3,288); Bozeman, MT
March 3, 2022; 7:00 p.m., ESPN+		Sacramento State	W 75–69	23–7 (15–4)	Brick Breeden Fieldhouse (3,959); Bozeman, MT
March 5, 2022; 4:00 p.m., ESPN+		Northern Colorado	W 87–85	24–7 (16–4)	Brick Breeden Fieldhouse (4,217); Bozeman, MT
Big Sky tournament
March 10, 2022; 12:00 pm, ESPN+	(1)	vs. (8) Sacramento State; Quarterfinals	W 83–61	25–7	Idaho Central Arena; Boise, ID
March 11, 2022; 5:30 pm, ESPN+	(1)	vs. (4) Weber State; Semifinals	W 69–66	26–7	Idaho Central Arena (2,535); Boise, ID
March 12, 2022; 6:00 pm, ESPNU	(1)	vs. (3) Northern Colorado; Championship	W 87–66	27–7	Idaho Central Arena (4,134); Boise, ID
NCAA tournament
March 18, 2022*; 11:45 a.m., TNT	(14 W)	vs. (3 W) No. 12 Texas Tech; First Round	L 62–97	27–8	Viejas Arena; San Diego, CA
*Non-conference game. ^{#}Rankings from AP Poll. (#) Tournament seedings in parentheses. W=West. All times are in Mountain.
