= 2021–22 Montana Grizzlies basketball team =

Basketball team in Montana

2021–22 Montana Grizzlies basketball
- Conference: Big Sky Conference
- Record: 18–14 (11–9 Big Sky)
- Head coach: Travis DeCuire (8th season)
- Associate head coach: Chris Cobb
- Assistant coaches: Jay Flores; Zach Payne
- Home arena: Dahlberg Arena

2021–22 Big Sky men's basketball standings
	Conf.				Overall
Team	W		L	PCT	W		L	PCT
Montana State †	16	–	4	.800	27	–	8	.771
Southern Utah	14	–	6	.700	23	–	12	.657
Northern Colorado	13	–	7	.650	22	–	16	.579
Weber State	13	–	7	.650	21	–	12	.636
Montana	11	–	9	.550	18	–	14	.563
Eastern Washington	11	–	9	.550	18	–	16	.529
Portland State	10	–	10	.500	14	–	17	.452
Sacramento State	6	–	14	.300	11	–	18	.379
Idaho	6	–	14	.300	9	–	22	.290
Idaho State	5	–	15	.250	7	–	23	.233
Northern Arizona	5	–	15	.250	9	–	23	.281
† Conference tournament winner

The 2021–22 Montana Grizzlies basketball team represented the University of Montana in the 2021–22 NCAA Division I men's basketball season. The Grizzlies, led by eighth-year head coach Travis DeCuire, played their home games at Dahlberg Arena in Missoula, Montana as members of the Big Sky Conference.

== Previous season ==
In a season limited due to the ongoing COVID-19 pandemic, the Grizzlies finished the 2020–21 season 15–13, 7–9 in Big Sky play to finish in sixth place. They defeated Idaho and Weber State in the Big Sky tournament before losing to Eastern Washington in the semifinals.

== Offseason ==
=== Departures ===
Name	Number	Pos.	Height	Weight	Year	Hometown	Reason for departure
Michael Steadman	1	F	6'11"	215	RS Senior	Union City, CA	Graduate transferred to UMass
Darius Henderson	2	F	6'9"	220	Junior	Pasadena, CA	Transferred to Corban
Eddy Egun	10	G	6'4"	204	RS Sophomore	Woodland Hills, CA	Transferred to Regis

=== Incoming transfers ===
Name	Number	Pos.	Height	Weight	Year	Hometown	Previous School
Lonnell Martin	1	G	6'4"	197	Junior	Flint, MI	Otero College
Scott Blakney	34	F	6'8"	231	RS Senior	Prosser, WA	Idaho

=== Recruiting classes ===
==== 2021 recruiting class ====
College recruiting information
Name	Hometown	School	Height	Weight	Commit date
Johnny Braggs; SG	Las Vegas, NV	Bishop Gorman High School	6 ft 2 in (1.88 m)	195 lb (88 kg)	Feb 2, 2021
Johnny Braggs; SG	Recruit ratings: Scout: Rivals: (NR)				
Overall recruit ranking:
Note: In many cases, Scout, Rivals, 247Sports, On3, and ESPN may conflict in their listings of height and weight.; In these cases, the average was taken. ESPN grades are on a 100-point scale.; Sources: "2021 Team Ranking". Rivals.

==== 2022 recruiting class ====
College recruiting information (2022)
Name	Hometown	School	Height	Weight	Commit date
Isaiah Kerr; PG	Mountain View, CA	Saint Francis High School	6 ft 2 in (1.88 m)	N/A	Jun 2, 2021
Isaiah Kerr; PG	Recruit ratings: Scout: Rivals: (NR)				
Jaxon Nap; SG	Renton, WA	Hazen High School	6 ft 6 in (1.98 m)	195 lb (88 kg)	Jul 19, 2021
Jaxon Nap; SG	Recruit ratings: Scout: Rivals: (NR)				
Rhett Reynolds; PF	Shelby, MT	Shelby High School	6 ft 9 in (2.06 m)	180 lb (82 kg)	Jan 4, 2021
Rhett Reynolds; PF	Recruit ratings: Scout: Rivals: (NR)				
Overall recruit ranking:
Note: In many cases, Scout, Rivals, 247Sports, On3, and ESPN may conflict in their listings of height and weight.; In these cases, the average was taken. ESPN grades are on a 100-point scale.; Sources: "2022 Team Ranking". Rivals.

== Roster ==
2021–22 Montana Grizzlies men's basketball team
Players
Coaches

Pos.	#	Name	Height	Weight	Year	Previous school	Hometown
G	0	Kyle Owens	6 ft 8 in (2.03 m)	205 lb (93 kg)	Jr	Crespi Carmelite High School	Calabasas, California
G	1	Lonnell Martin Jr.	6 ft 4 in (1.93 m)	210 lb (95 kg)	Jr	Otero College	Flint, Michigan
G	3	Josh Vazquez	6 ft 3 in (1.91 m)	180 lb (82 kg)	Jr	Bishop Montgomery High School	Torrance, California
G	4	Johnny Braggs	6 ft 3 in (1.91 m)	200 lb (91 kg)	Fr	Bishop Gorman High School	Las Vegas, Nevada
G	5	Robby Beasley III	6 ft 3 in (1.91 m)	190 lb (86 kg)	So	Dublin High School	San Ramon, California
F	10	John Solomon (W)	6 ft 8 in (2.03 m)	205 lb (93 kg)	Fr	Riverview High School	Sarasota, Florida
G	11	Cameron Parker	6 ft 2 in (1.88 m)	170 lb (77 kg)	Sr	Sacred Heart	Beaverton, Oregon
G	12	Brandon Whitney	6 ft 1 in (1.85 m)	180 lb (82 kg)	So	Bishop Alemany High School	Mission Hills, California
F	13	Josh Bannan	6 ft 9 in (2.06 m)	220 lb (100 kg)	So	UC Lake Ginninderra	Melbourne, Australia
F	23	Mack Anderson	6 ft 9 in (2.06 m)	215 lb (98 kg)	Sr	Bozeman High School	Bozeman, Montana
G	24	Freddy Brown III	6 ft 2 in (1.88 m)	180 lb (82 kg)	RS Jr	Nathan Hale High School	Seattle, Washington
G	30	Jack Wetzel (W)	6 ft 4 in (1.93 m)	170 lb (77 kg)	Fr	Kennedy High School	Cedar Rapids, Iowa
F	34	Scott Blakney	6 ft 8 in (2.03 m)	235 lb (107 kg)	RS Sr	Idaho	Prosser, Washington
F	35	Derrick Carter-Hollinger	6 ft 5 in (1.96 m)	215 lb (98 kg)	Jr	Foothills Christian High School	San Diego, California

Head coach

- Travis DeCuire (Montana)

Assistant coach(es)

- Chris Cobb (Menlo)
- Jay Flores (Chico State)
- Zach Payne (Whitworth)

Legend

- (C) Team captain
- (S) Suspended
- (I) Ineligible
- (W) Walk-on
- Injured
- Current redshirt

Roster

== Schedule and results ==
Date time, TV	Rank^{#}	Opponent^{#}	Result	Record	Site (attendance) city, state
Regular season
November 9, 2021*; 7:00 p.m., ESPN+		Dickinson State	W 74–27	1–0	Dahlberg Arena (3,389); Missoula, MT
November 13, 2021*; 5:00 p.m., SECN+		at Mississippi State	L 49–86	1–1	Humphrey Coliseum (6,289); Starkville, MS
November 15, 2021*; 6:00 p.m., MidcoSN		at North Dakota	L 77–79	1–2	Betty Engelstad Sioux Center (1,263); Grand Forks, ND
November 20, 2021*; 7:00 p.m., ESPN+		Omaha	W 68–47	2–2	Dahlberg Arena (2,967); Missoula, MT
November 24, 2021*; 7:30 p.m., ESPN+		UC San Diego; Zootown Classic	W 71–61	3–2	Dahlberg Arena (2,917); Missoula, MT
November 25, 2021*; 7:30 p.m., ESPN+		UNC Wilmington; Zootown Classic	Canceled		Dahlberg Arena; Missoula, MT
November 26, 2021*; 7:30 p.m., ESPN+		Southern Miss; Zootown Classic	W 74–62	4–2	Dahlberg Arena (3,135); Missoula, MT
November 29, 2021*; 8:00 p.m., P12N		at Oregon	L 47–87	4–3	Matthew Knight Arena (5,739); Eugene, OR
December 2, 2021; 8:00 p.m., ESPN+		at Sacramento State	W 65–58	5–3 (1–0)	Hornets Nest (685); Sacramento, CA
December 4, 2021; 6:00 p.m., ESPN+		at Northern Colorado	L 75–78	5–4 (1–1)	Bank of Colorado Arena (1,178); Greeley, CO
December 8, 2021*; 7:00 p.m., ESPN+		Air Force	W 66–48	6–4	Dahlberg Arena (2,841); Missoula, MT
December 10, 2021*; 7:00 p.m., ESPN+		Yellowstone Christian College	W 104–43	7–4	Dahlberg Arena (1,144); Missoula, MT
December 13, 2021*; 7:00 p.m., ESPN+		SAGU American Indian College	W 118–49	8–4	Dahlberg Arena (2,395); Missoula, MT
December 19, 2021*; 3:00 p.m.		at Santa Clara	L 64–79	8–5	Leavey Center (835); Santa Clara, CA
December 30, 2021; 7:00 p.m., ESPN+		Idaho State	W 78–54	9–5 (2–1)	Dahlberg Arena (3,233); Missoula, MT
January 1, 2022; 7:00 p.m., ESPN+		Weber State	W 74–72	10–5 (3–1)	Dahlberg Arena (3,409); Missoula, MT
January 6, 2022; 7:00 p.m., SWX/ESPN+		at Eastern Washington	W 90–78	11–5 (4–1)	Reese Court (1,140); Cheney, WA
January 9, 2022; 7:00 p.m., SWX/ESPN+		at Montana State	L 59–66	11–6 (4–2)	Brick Breeden Fieldhouse (3,763); Bozeman, MT
January 20, 2022; 8:00 p.m., ESPN+		at Portland State	W 66–64	12–6 (5–2)	Viking Pavilion (954); Portland, OR
January 22, 2022; 2:00 p.m., ESPN+		at Northern Arizona	W 58–48	13–6 (6–2)	Walkup Skydome (736); Flagstaff, AZ
January 27, 2022; 7:00 p.m., ESPN+		Idaho	W 81–62	14–6 (7–2)	Dahlberg Arena (3,014); Missoula, MT
January 29, 2022; 7:00 p.m., ESPN+		Eastern Washington	W 61–59	15–6 (8–2)	Dahlberg Arena (3,882); Missoula, MT
February 3, 2022; 7:00 p.m., ESPN+		at Weber State	L 75–80	15–7 (8–3)	Dee Events Center (5,322); Ogden, UT
February 5, 2022; 6:00 p.m., ESPN+		at Idaho State	L 63–86	15–8 (8–4)	Holt Arena (1,160); Pocatello, ID
February 7, 2022; 6:00 p.m., SWX/ESPN+		Southern Utah; Rescheduled from January 13	W 78–67	16–8 (9–4)	Dahlberg Arena (2,947); Missoula, MT
February 10, 2022; 7:00 p.m., ESPN+		Northern Arizona	L 67–72 ^{OT}	16–9 (9–5)	Dahlberg Arena (3,037); Missoula, MT
February 12, 2022; 7:00 p.m., SWX/ESPN+		Portland State	W 85–76	17–9 (10–5)	Dahlberg Arena (3,223); Missoula, MT
February 17, 2022; 7:00 p.m., ESPN+		at Idaho	L 76–82	17–10 (10–6)	ICCU Arena (1,310); Moscow, ID
February 24, 2022; 7:00 p.m., ESPN+		at Southern Utah	L 74–82	17–11 (10–7)	America First Event Center (1,817); Cedar City, UT
February 27, 2022; 3:00 p.m., ESPNU		Montana State	W 80–74	18–11 (11–7)	Dahlberg Arena (5,285); Missoula, MT
March 3, 2022; 7:00 p.m., SWX/ESPN+		Northern Colorado	L 66–75	18–12 (11–8)	Dahlberg Arena (3,278); Missoula, MT
March 5, 2022; 7:00 p.m., ESPN+		Sacramento State	L 71–72	18–13 (11–9)	Dahlberg Arena (3,821); Missoula, MT
Big Sky tournament
March 10, 2022; 2:30 p.m., ESPN+	(5)	vs. (4) Weber State; Quarterfinals	L 56–68	18–14	Idaho Central Arena (1,334); Boise, ID
*Non-conference game. ^{#}Rankings from AP Poll. (#) Tournament seedings in parentheses. All times are in Mountain.
