= 2021–22 Weber State Wildcats men's basketball team =

American college basketball season

2021–22 Weber State Wildcats men's basketball
- Conference: Big Sky Conference
- Record: 21–12 (13–7 Big Sky)
- Head coach: Randy Rahe (16th season)
- Associate head coach: Eric Duft
- Assistant coaches: David Marek; Eric Daniels
- Home arena: Dee Events Center

2021–22 Big Sky men's basketball standings
	Conf.				Overall
Team	W		L	PCT	W		L	PCT
Montana State †	16	–	4	.800	27	–	8	.771
Southern Utah	14	–	6	.700	23	–	12	.657
Northern Colorado	13	–	7	.650	22	–	16	.579
Weber State	13	–	7	.650	21	–	12	.636
Montana	11	–	9	.550	18	–	14	.563
Eastern Washington	11	–	9	.550	18	–	16	.529
Portland State	10	–	10	.500	14	–	17	.452
Sacramento State	6	–	14	.300	11	–	18	.379
Idaho	6	–	14	.300	9	–	22	.290
Idaho State	5	–	15	.250	7	–	23	.233
Northern Arizona	5	–	15	.250	9	–	23	.281
† Conference tournament winner

The 2021–22 Weber State Wildcats men's basketball team represented Weber State University in the 2021–22 NCAA Division I men's basketball season. The Wildcats, led by 16th-year head coach Randy Rahe, played their home games at the Dee Events Center in Ogden, Utah, as members of the Big Sky Conference. After the season, Rahe would retire as the winningest coach in Weber State and Big Sky conference history. He would be succeeded by assistant coach Eric Duft.

== Previous season ==
In a season limited due to the ongoing COVID-19 pandemic, the Wildcats finished the 2020–21 season 17–6, 12–3 in Big Sky play to finish a tie for second place. As the No. 3 seed in the Big Sky tournament, they lost in the quarterfinals to Montana.

== Roster ==
2021–22 Weber State Wildcats men's basketball team
Players
Coaches

Pos.	#	Name	Height	Weight	Year	Previous school	Hometown
G/F	0	Zahir Porter	6 ft 6 in (1.98 m)	180 lb (82 kg)	Jr	Independence CC	Bronx, NY
F	2	Dillon Jones	6 ft 6 in (1.98 m)	235 lb (107 kg)	Fr	Sunrise Christian Prep	Columbia, SC
G	3	KJ Cunningham	6 ft 2 in (1.88 m)	190 lb (86 kg)	So	Rudder HS	Bryan, TX
F/C	4	David Nzekwesi	6 ft 9 in (2.06 m)	250 lb (113 kg)	Jr	Denver	The Hague, Netherlands
G	5	Seikou Sisoho Jawara	6 ft 3 in (1.91 m)	210 lb (95 kg)	So	Loyola Marymount	Mataró, Spain
F	11	Michal Kozak	6 ft 8 in (2.03 m)	215 lb (98 kg)	Sr	Get Better Academy	Plzeň, Czech Republic
F	13	Donatas Kupsas	6 ft 8 in (2.03 m)	210 lb (95 kg)	So	Long Island Lutheran HS	Joniškis, Lithuania
G	14	Josh Sanders	6 ft 2 in (1.88 m)	180 lb (82 kg)	Fr	Davis HS	Kaysville, UT
G	15	Koby McEwen	6 ft 4 in (1.93 m)	195 lb (88 kg)	Sr	Marquette	Toronto, Canada
C	20	Alex Tew	6 ft 11 in (2.11 m)	250 lb (113 kg)	Fr	Cooper International Academy	Cheshire, England
C	21	Dontay Bassett	6 ft 9 in (2.06 m)	250 lb (113 kg)	Sr	Florida	Oakland, CA
G	23	Chance Trujillo	6 ft 3 in (1.91 m)	205 lb (93 kg)	Fr	Davis HS	Kaysville, UT
G/F	24	JJ Overton	6 ft 6 in (1.98 m)	190 lb (86 kg)	Sr	Utah Valley	San Diego, CA
F	25	Jake Furgerson	6 ft 7 in (2.01 m)	210 lb (95 kg)	So	Notre Dame de Namur	Star, ID
F/C	34	Cody Carlson	6 ft 10 in (2.08 m)	230 lb (104 kg)	Sr	Concordia–St. Paul	Duluth, MN
F	44	Dyson Koehler	6 ft 7 in (2.01 m)	220 lb (100 kg)	Fr	Cal Poly	Draper, UT

Head coach

- Randy Rahe (Buena Vista)

Assistant coach(es)

- Eric Duft (Sterling (KS))
- David Marek (Southern Utah)
- Eric Daniels (Johnson & Wales)

Legend

- (C) Team captain
- (S) Suspended
- (I) Ineligible
- (W) Walk-on
- Injured
- Current redshirt

Roster
Last update: October 30, 2021

== Schedule and results ==
Date time, TV	Rank^{#}	Opponent^{#}	Result	Record	Site (attendance) city, state
Exhibition
November 4, 2021*; 7:00 pm		Concordia–St. Paul	W 101–74		Dee Events Center; Ogden, UT
Regular season
November 9, 2021*; 7:00 pm, ESPN+		Western Colorado	W 100–60	1–0	Dee Events Center (2,622); Ogden, UT
November 15, 2021*; 5:00 pm, ESPN+		at Duquesne	W 63–59	2–0	UPMC Cooper Fieldhouse (2,045); Pittsburgh, PA
November 18, 2021*; 3:30 pm, CBSSN		vs. UMass; Jersey Mike's Classic	W 88–73	3–0	McArthur Center (201); St. Petersburg, FL
November 19, 2021*; 3:30 pm		vs. Ball State; Jersey Mike's Classic	W 85–74	4–0	McArthur Center (375); St. Petersburg, FL
November 21, 2021*; 10:00 am		vs. Green Bay; Jersey Mike's Classic	W 68–58	5–0	McArthur Center; St. Petersburg, FL
November 27, 2021*; 7:00 pm, ESPN+		at Dixie State	W 87–70	6–0	Burns Arena (2,352); St. George, UT
December 2, 2021; 7:00 pm, ESPN+		Northern Arizona	W 67–44	7–0 (1–0)	Dee Events Center (2,522); Ogden, UT
December 4, 2021; 6:00 pm, ESPN+		Portland State	W 80–69	8–0 (2–0)	Dee Events Center; Ogden, UT
December 8, 2021*; 8:00 pm		at Washington State	L 60–94	8–1	Beasley Coliseum (2,900); Pullman, WA
December 11, 2021*; 2:30 pm, ESPN+		Maine Fort Kent	W 82–36	9–1	Dee Events Center (2,119); Ogden, UT
December 15, 2021*; 7:00 pm, KJZZ		Utah State	L 80–95	9–2	Dee Events Center (6,355); Ogden, UT
December 18, 2021*; 6:00 pm, KJZZ		BYU	L 71–89	9–3	Dee Events Center (8,922); Ogden, UT
December 23, 2021*; 4:00 pm, ESPN+		Fresno State	L 43–69	9–4	Dee Events Center (2,631); Ogden, UT
December 30, 2021; 7:00 pm, ESPN+		at Montana State	W 85–75	10–4 (3–0)	Brick Breeden Fieldhouse (2,918); Bozeman, MT
January 1, 2022; 7:00 pm, ESPN+		at Montana	L 72–74	10–5 (3–1)	Dahlberg Arena (3,409); Missoula, MT
January 13, 2022; 7:00 pm, ESPN+		Idaho	W 84–74	11–5 (4–1)	Dee Events Center (2,822); Ogden, UT
January 17, 2022; 6:00 pm, ESPN+		at Idaho State; Rescheduled from January 8	W 78–61	12–5 (5–1)	Reed Gym (1,220); Pocatello, ID
January 20, 2022; 7:00 pm, ESPN+		Idaho State	W 95–63	13–5 (6–1)	Dee Events Center (3,723); Ogden, UT
January 24, 2022; 7:00 pm, ESPN+		at Southern Utah	W 92–84	14–5 (7–1)	America First Event Center (3,133); Cedar City, UT
January 27, 2022; 6:00 pm, ESPN+		at Northern Colorado	W 85–76	15–5 (8–1)	Bank of Colorado Arena (1,629); Greeley, CO
January 29, 2022; 8:00 pm, ESPN+		at Sacramento State	W 79–59	16–5 (9–1)	Hornets Nest (606); Sacramento, CA
January 31, 2022; 6:00 pm, ESPN+		Eastern Washington; Rescheduled from January 15	W 90–84	17–5 (10–1)	Dee Events Center (3,462); Ogden, UT
February 3, 2022; 7:00 pm, ESPN+		Montana	W 80–75	18–5 (11–1)	Dee Events Center (5,322); Ogden, UT
February 5, 2022; 6:00 pm, KJZZ		Montana State	L 57–78	18–6 (11–2)	Dee Events Center (6,239); Ogden, UT
February 10, 2022; 7:00 pm, ESPN+		at Eastern Washington	L 67–75	18–7 (11–3)	Reese Court (1,155); Cheney, WA
February 12, 2022; 3:00 pm, ESPN+		at Idaho	L 79–83	18–8 (11–4)	Idaho Central Credit Union Arena (1,059); Moscow, ID
February 17, 2022; 7:00 pm, ESPN+		Sacramento State	W 65–50	19–8 (12–4)	Dee Events Center (5,217); Ogden, UT
February 19, 2022; 6:00 pm, ESPN+		Northern Colorado	L 79–83 ^{OT}	19–9 (12–5)	Dee Events Center (5,543); Ogden, UT
February 24, 2022; 8:00 pm, ESPN+		at Portland State	L 75–81	19–10 (12–6)	Viking Pavilion (1,077); Portland, OR
February 26, 2022; 2:00 pm, ESPN+		at Northern Arizona	W 73–49	20–10 (13–6)	Walkup Skydome (1,056); Flagstaff, AZ
March 5, 2022; 6:00 pm, ESPN+		Southern Utah	L 70–80	20–11 (13–7)	Dee Events Center (6,166); Ogden, UT
Big Sky tournament
March 10, 2022; 2:30 pm, ESPN+	(4)	vs. (5) Montana; Quarterfinals	W 68–56	21–11	Idaho Central Arena (1,334); Boise, ID
March 11, 2022; 6:00 pm, ESPN+	(4)	vs. (1) Montana State; Semifinals	L 66–69	21–12	Idaho Central Arena (2,535); Boise, ID
*Non-conference game. ^{#}Rankings from AP Poll. (#) Tournament seedings in parentheses. All times are in Mountain.
