= 2021–22 Sacramento State Hornets men's basketball team =

American college basketball season

2021–22 Sacramento State Hornets men's basketball
- Conference: Big Sky Conference
- Record: 11–18 (6–14 Big Sky)
- Head coach: Brandon Laird (interim)
- Assistant coaches: Nate Smith; Sam Kirby
- Home arena: Hornets Nest (Capacity: 1,012)

2021–22 Big Sky men's basketball standings
	Conf.				Overall
Team	W		L	PCT	W		L	PCT
Montana State †	16	–	4	.800	27	–	8	.771
Southern Utah	14	–	6	.700	23	–	12	.657
Northern Colorado	13	–	7	.650	22	–	16	.579
Weber State	13	–	7	.650	21	–	12	.636
Montana	11	–	9	.550	18	–	14	.563
Eastern Washington	11	–	9	.550	18	–	16	.529
Portland State	10	–	10	.500	14	–	17	.452
Sacramento State	6	–	14	.300	11	–	18	.379
Idaho	6	–	14	.300	9	–	22	.290
Idaho State	5	–	15	.250	7	–	23	.233
Northern Arizona	5	–	15	.250	9	–	23	.281
† Conference tournament winner

The 2021–22 Sacramento State Hornets men's basketball team represented California State University, Sacramento in the 2021–22 NCAA Division I men's basketball season. The Hornets, led by interim head coach Brandon Laird, played their home games at the Hornets Nest in Sacramento, California as members of the Big Sky Conference.

== Previous season ==
The Hornets finished the 2020–21 season 8–12, 5–9 in Big Sky play, to finish in ninth place. They lost to Northern Colorado in the first round of the Big Sky tournament.

== Roster ==
2021–22 Sacramento State Hornets men's basketball team
Players
Coaches

Pos.	#	Name	Height	Weight	Year	Previous school	Hometown
G/F	1	Teiano Hardee	6 ft 5 in (1.96 m)	215 lb (98 kg)	Fr	Vanden HS	Fairfield, CA
G	2	Marcus Greene	6 ft 2 in (1.88 m)	190 lb (86 kg)	Fr	Scotland Campus Prep	Gilroy, CA
G	3	Rick III Barros	6 ft 5 in (1.96 m)	200 lb (91 kg)	RS Fr	Nation Wide Academy	Sacramento, CA
G	4	Zach Chappell	6 ft 3 in (1.91 m)	195 lb (88 kg)	Jr	San Jose State	Sacramento, CA
G	11	Deshaun Highler	6 ft 2 in (1.88 m)	180 lb (82 kg)	Jr	East Los Angeles College	Riverside, CA
G	13	Xavier Ford	6 ft 3 in (1.91 m)	205 lb (93 kg)	Sr	Riverside City College	Pasadena, CA
G	14	William FitzPatrick	6 ft 3 in (1.91 m)	200 lb (91 kg)	Sr	Folsom Lake College	Folsom, CA
G	15	Elijah McCullough	6 ft 3 in (1.91 m)	180 lb (82 kg)	RS So	Damien HS	Chino Hills, CA
F/C	21	Jonathan Komagum	6 ft 9 in (2.06 m)	215 lb (98 kg)	Jr	Toledo	London, England
F	22	Cameron Wilbon	6 ft 5 in (1.96 m)	200 lb (91 kg)	So	Robert Morris	Gary, IN
G/F	23	Bryce Fowler	6 ft 6 in (1.98 m)	215 lb (98 kg)	Sr	Agua Fria HS	Avondale, AZ
G	24	Chris Holley	6 ft 2 in (1.88 m)	175 lb (79 kg)	Fr	Jesuit HS	Sacramento, CA
G	30	Akili Evans	6 ft 5 in (1.96 m)	180 lb (82 kg)	Fr	Lee Academy	Waterbury, CT
C	32	Hugo Clarkin	7 ft 0 in (2.13 m)	220 lb (100 kg)	Fr	San Jose State	Newbury, England
F	33	Theo Seng	6 ft 9 in (2.06 m)	205 lb (93 kg)	Fr	San Francisco State	Davis, CA

Head coach

- Brandon Laird (UC Davis)

Assistant coach(es)

- Nate Smith (Sacramento State)
- Sam Kirby (Seattle)

Legend

- (C) Team captain
- (S) Suspended
- (I) Ineligible
- (W) Walk-on
- Injured
- Current redshirt

Roster
Last update: August 7, 2024

== Schedule and results ==
Date time, TV	Rank^{#}	Opponent^{#}	Result	Record	Site (attendance) city, state
Regular season
November 9, 2021*; 7:00 p.m.		William Jessup	W 89–59	1–0	Hornets Nest (912); Sacramento, CA
November 13, 2021*; 7:30 p.m.		at Utah	L 56–89	1–1	Jon M. Huntsman Center (6,805); Salt Lake City, UT
November 15, 2021*; 7:00 p.m.		at Cal Poly	W 58–57	2–1	Mott Athletics Center (1,214); San Luis Obispo, CA
November 20, 2021*; 7:00 p.m.		UC San Diego	L 56–71	2–2	Hornets Nest (845); Sacramento, CA
November 23, 2021*; 7:30 p.m.		vs. UC Davis	W 75–63	3–2	Golden 1 Center (1,507); Sacramento, CA
November 27, 2021*; 5:30 p.m.		at No. 17 Arizona	L 59–105	3–3	McKale Center (11,733); Tucson, AZ
December 2, 2021; 7:00 p.m.		Montana	L 58–65	3–4 (0–1)	Hornets Nest (685); Sacramento, CA
December 4, 2021; 1:00 p.m.		Montana State	L 66–68	3–5 (0–2)	Hornets Nest (372); Sacramento, CA
December 17, 2021*; 2:00 p.m.		Menlo	W 67–53	4–5	Hornets Nest; Sacramento, CA
December 19, 2021*; 2:00 p.m.		at UC Riverside	Canceled due to COVID-19 protocols		SRC Arena; Riverside, CA
December 30, 2021; 6:00 p.m., ESPN+		at Southern Utah	L 51–64	4–6 (0–3)	America First Event Center (1,261); Cedar City, UT
January 3, 2022*; 3:00 p.m.		at Oregon State	Canceled due to COVID-19 protocols		Gill Coliseum; Corvallis, OR
January 8, 2022; 1:00 p.m., ESPN+		at Northern Colorado	W 85–71	5–6 (1–3)	Bank of Colorado Arena (1,204); Greeley, CO
January 15, 2022; 2:00 p.m., ESPN+		Portland State	L 62–67	5–7 (1–4)	Hornets Nest (498); Sacramento, CA
January 20, 2022; 6:00 p.m., ESPN+		at Eastern Washington	L 62–75	5–8 (1–5)	Reese Court (1,075); Cheney, WA
January 22, 2022; 2:00 p.m., ESPN+		at Idaho	L 72–73 ^{OT}	5–9 (1–6)	Idaho Central Credit Union Arena (1,134); Moscow, ID
January 24, 2022; 6:00 p.m., ESPN+		at Northern Arizona; Rescheduled from January 10	L 65–70	5–10 (1–7)	Walkup Skydome (547); Flagstaff, AZ
January 27, 2022; 7:00 p.m., ESPN+		Idaho State	W 61–60	6–10 (2–7)	Hornets Nest (482); Sacramento, CA
January 29, 2022; 7:00 p.m., ESPN+		Weber State	L 59–79	6–11 (2–8)	Hornets Nest (606); Sacramento, CA
February 3, 2022; 7:00 p.m., ESPN+		Northern Arizona	L 61–62	6–12 (2–9)	Hornets Nest (534); Sacramento, CA
February 5, 2022; 7:00 p.m., ESPN+		at Portland State	L 65–73	6–13 (2–10)	Viking Pavilion (1,096); Portland, OR
February 10, 2022; 7:00 p.m., ESPN+		Northern Colorado	L 61–79	6–14 (2–11)	Hornets Nest (916); Sacramento, CA
February 12, 2022; 1:00 p.m., ESPN+		Southern Utah	L 57–83	6–15 (2–12)	Hornets Nest (503); Sacramento, CA
February 17, 2022; 6:00 p.m., ESPN+		Weber State	L 50–65	6–16 (2–13)	Dee Events Center (5,217); Ogden, UT
February 19, 2022; 5:00 p.m., ESPN+		at Idaho State	W 80–75	7–16 (3–13)	Reed Gym (1,380); Pocatello, ID
February 24, 2022; 7:00 p.m., ESPN+		Idaho	W 83–51	8–16 (4–13)	Hornets Nest (565); Sacramento, CA
February 26, 2022; 6:00 p.m., ESPN+		Eastern Washington	W 81–75	9–16 (5–13)	Hornets Nest (741); Sacramento, CA
March 3, 2022; 6:00 p.m., ESPN+		at Montana State	L 69–75	9–17 (5–14)	Brick Breeden Fieldhouse; Bozeman, MT
March 5, 2022; 6:00 p.m., ESPN+		at Montana	W 72–71	10–17 (6–14)	Dahlberg Arena (3,821); Missoula, MT
Big Sky tournament
March 9, 2022; 8:30 a.m., ESPN+	(8)	vs. (9) Idaho; First round	W 57–54	11–17	Idaho Central Arena (1,403); Boise, ID
March 10, 2022; 11:00 a.m., ESPN+	(8)	vs. (1) Montana State; Quarterfinals	L 61–83	11–18	Idaho Central Arena; Boise, ID
*Non-conference game. ^{#}Rankings from AP poll. (#) Tournament seedings in parentheses. All times are in Pacific.
