= 2021–22 Idaho State Bengals men's basketball team =

American college basketball season

2021–22 Idaho State Bengals men's basketball
- Conference: Big Sky Conference
- Record: 7–23 (5–15 Big Sky)
- Head coach: Ryan Looney (3rd season)
- Assistant coaches: Joe White; Rosbie Mutcherson; Davis Furman
- Home arena: Reed Gym

2021–22 Big Sky men's basketball standings
	Conf.				Overall
Team	W		L	PCT	W		L	PCT
Montana State †	16	–	4	.800	27	–	8	.771
Southern Utah	14	–	6	.700	23	–	12	.657
Northern Colorado	13	–	7	.650	22	–	16	.579
Weber State	13	–	7	.650	21	–	12	.636
Montana	11	–	9	.550	18	–	14	.563
Eastern Washington	11	–	9	.550	18	–	16	.529
Portland State	10	–	10	.500	14	–	17	.452
Sacramento State	6	–	14	.300	11	–	18	.379
Idaho	6	–	14	.300	9	–	22	.290
Idaho State	5	–	15	.250	7	–	23	.233
Northern Arizona	5	–	15	.250	9	–	23	.281
† Conference tournament winner

The 2021–22 Idaho State Bengals men's basketball team represented Idaho State University in the 2021–22 NCAA Division I men's basketball season. The Bengals, led by third-year head coach Ryan Looney, played their home games at Reed Gym in Pocatello, Idaho as members of the Big Sky Conference.

== Previous season ==
The Bengals finished the 2020–21 season 13–11, 8–6 in Big Sky play to finish in a tie for fourth place. As the #4 seed in the Big Sky tournament, they lost to #5 seed Montana State in the quarterfinals.

== Roster ==
2021–22 Idaho State Bengals men's basketball team
Players
Coaches

Pos.	#	Name	Height	Weight	Year	Previous school	Hometown
G	0	AJ Burgin	6 ft 4 in (1.93 m)	200 lb (91 kg)	Fr	San Diego HS	San Diego, CA
G	1	Liam Sorensen	6 ft 4 in (1.93 m)	205 lb (93 kg)	Fr	Get Better Academy	Haldum, Denmark
G	2	Tarik Cool	6 ft 4 in (1.93 m)	180 lb (82 kg)	Sr	Lane CC	Chandler, AZ
F	3	Malik Porter	6 ft 5 in (1.96 m)	215 lb (98 kg)	Sr	CSI	Phoenix, AZ
G	4	Emmit Taylor III	6 ft 4 in (1.93 m)	195 lb (88 kg)	Jr	North Idaho	Lapwai, ID
G	5	Austin Smellie	6 ft 5 in (1.96 m)	195 lb (88 kg)	Jr	Preston HS	Preston, ID
G	10	Tommy Ball	6 ft 0 in (1.83 m)	175 lb (79 kg)	Fr	Oak Ridge HS	El Dorado Hills, CA
F	12	James Carlson	6 ft 9 in (2.06 m)	215 lb (98 kg)	Jr	North Idaho	Coeur d'Alene, ID
F	13	Daxton Carr	6 ft 7 in (2.01 m)	215 lb (98 kg)	So	Cal Poly	Pocatello, ID
F	14	Kyle Karstetter	6 ft 7 in (2.01 m)	210 lb (95 kg)	Fr	Moses Lake HS	Moses Lake, WA
G	20	Robert Ford III	6 ft 0 in (1.83 m)	185 lb (84 kg)	Jr	Clackamas CC	Portland, OR
F	22	Jared Rodriguez	6 ft 8 in (2.03 m)	215 lb (98 kg)	Jr	San Diego	Glendale, AZ
G	24	Pablo Tamba	6 ft 6 in (1.98 m)	200 lb (91 kg)	Fr	Unicaja-Andalucia	Málaga, Spain
C	25	Brayden Parker	6 ft 8 in (2.03 m)	250 lb (113 kg)	So	CSI	Preston, ID
C	32	Zach Visentin	6 ft 9 in (2.06 m)	260 lb (118 kg)	Fr	Springville HS	Springville, UT
C	34	Gedeon Buzangu	6 ft 8 in (2.03 m)	230 lb (104 kg)	Jr	Miles CC	Kinshasa, Congo
F	44	Louis Stormark	6 ft 8 in (2.03 m)	240 lb (109 kg)	Fr	Get Better Academy	Allerød, Denmark

Head coach

- Ryan Looney (Eastern Oregon)

Assistant coach(es)

- Joe White (Southern Oregon)
- Rosbie Mutcherson (Covenant)
- Davis Furman (Butler)

Legend

- (C) Team captain
- (S) Suspended
- (I) Ineligible
- (W) Walk-on
- Injured
- Current redshirt

Roster
Last update: December 4, 2021

== Schedule and results ==
Date time, TV	Rank^{#}	Opponent^{#}	Result	Record	Site (attendance) city, state
Exhibition
October 30, 2021*; 6:00 pm		Multnomah	W 101–67	–	Reed Gym; Pocatello, ID
November 5, 2021*; 7:30 pm		Life Pacific	W 76–52	–	Reed Gym; Pocatello, ID
Regular season
November 9, 2021*; 7:00 pm, ESPN+		Eastern Oregon	W 82–61	1–0	Reed Gym (1,078); Pocatello, ID
November 12, 2021*; 8:00 pm		at Pepperdine	L 60–65	1–1	Firestone Fieldhouse (1,210); Malibu, CA
November 14, 2021*; 6:00 pm, ESPN+		at Seattle	L 51–77	1–2	Climate Pledge Arena (2,302); Seattle, WA
November 19, 2021*; 5:00 pm, BTN+		at Nebraska	L 60–78	1–3	Pinnacle Bank Arena (15,274); Lincoln, NE
November 22, 2021*; 7:00 pm, ESPN+		Kansas City	L 58–74	1–4	Reed Gym (1,176); Pocatello, ID
November 27, 2021*; 2:00 pm		at Air Force	L 48–59	1–5	Clune Arena (1,245); Colorado Springs, CO
December 2, 2021; 7:00 pm, ESPN+		Portland State	L 55–63	1–6 (0–1)	Reed Gym (1,102); Pocatello, ID
December 4, 2021; 6:00 pm, ESPN+		Northern Arizona	L 70–73	1–7 (0–2)	Reed Gym (1,094); Pocatello, ID
December 8, 2021*; 8:00 pm, P12N		at California	L 46–72	1–8	Haas Pavilion (3,132); Berkeley, CA
December 18, 2021*; 6:00 pm, ESPN+		Bethesda	W 103–68	2–8	Reed Gym (978); Pocatello, ID
December 22, 2021*; 2:00 pm, ESPN+		at UC Santa Barbara	L 43–56	2–9	The Thunderdome (526); Santa Barbara, CA
December 30, 2021; 7:00 pm, ESPN+		at Montana	L 54–78	2–10 (0–3)	Dahlberg Arena (3,233); Missoula, MT
January 1, 2022; 1:00 pm, ESPN+		at Montana State	L 40–60	2–11 (0–4)	Brick Breeden Fieldhouse (2,200); Bozeman, MT
January 15, 2022; 6:00 pm, ESPN+		Idaho; Battle of the Domes	W 81–74	3–11 (1–4)	Reed Gym (1,474); Pocatello, ID
January 17, 2022; 7:00 pm, ESPN+		Weber State; Rescheduled from January 8	L 61–78	3–12 (1–5)	Reed Gym (1,220); Pocatello, ID
January 20, 2022; 7:00 pm, ESPN+		at Weber State	L 63–95	3–13 (1–6)	Dee Events Center (3,723); Ogden, UT
January 22, 2022; 2:00 pm, ESPN+		at Southern Utah	L 74–86	3–14 (1–7)	America First Event Center (1,033); Cedar City, UT
January 24, 2022; 7:00 pm, ESPN+		Eastern Washington; Rescheduled from January 13	L 63–89	3–15 (1–8)	Reed Gym (1,042); Pocatello, ID
January 27, 2022; 8:00 pm, ESPN+		at Sacramento State	L 60–61	3–16 (1–9)	Hornets Nest (482); Sacramento, CA
February 5, 2022; 7:00 pm, ESPN+		Montana	W 86–63	4–16 (2–9)	Reed Gym (1,160); Pocatello, ID
February 7, 2022; 6:00 pm, ESPN+		Montana State; Rescheduled from February 3	L 54–72	4–17 (2–10)	Reed Gym (1,027); Pocatello, ID
February 10, 2022; 7:00 pm, ESPN+		at Idaho; Battle of the Domes	W 79–70	5–17 (3–10)	Idaho Central Credit Union Arena (1,323); Moscow, ID
February 12, 2022; 3:00 pm, ESPN+		at Eastern Washington	L 72–75	5–18 (3–11)	Reese Court (1,336); Cheney, WA
February 17, 2022; 7:00 pm, ESPN+		Northern Colorado	W 61–58	6–18 (4–11)	Reed Gym (1,088); Pocatello, ID
February 19, 2022; 6:00 pm, ESPN+		Sacramento State	L 75–80	6–19 (4–12)	Reed Gym (1,380); Pocatello, ID
February 21, 2022; 6:00 pm, ESPN+		at Northern Colorado; Rescheduled from January 29	L 70–77	6–20 (4–13)	Bank of Colorado Arena (1,136); Greeley, CO
February 24, 2022; 6:00 pm, ESPN+		at Northern Arizona	W 70–66	7–20 (5–13)	Walkup Skydome (577); Flagstaff, AZ
February 26, 2022; 8:00 pm, ESPN+		at Portland State	L 69–73 ^{OT}	7–21 (5–14)	Viking Pavilion (1,084); Portland, OR
March 3, 2022; 7:00 pm, ESPN+		Southern Utah	L 71–79	7–22 (5–15)	Reed Gym (1,334); Pocatello, ID
Big Sky tournament
March 9, 2022; 12:00 pm, ESPN+	(10)	vs. (7) Portland State; First round	L 52–66	7–23	Idaho Central Arena (1,498); Boise, ID
*Non-conference game. ^{#}Rankings from AP Poll. (#) Tournament seedings in parentheses. All times are in Mountain.
