= Jase Coburn =

American basketball coach

Current position
- Title: Head coach
- Team: Portland State
- Conference: Big Sky
- Record: 82–75 (.522)

Biographical details
- Born: September 16, 1983 (age 43)
- Education: Arizona State (2006)

Playing career
- 2002–2004: MiraCosta College

Coaching career (HC unless noted)
- 2004–2005: Corona del Sol HS (asst.)
- 2005–2007: Phoenix JC (asst.)
- 2007–2011: McClintock HS
- 2011–2013: Howard JC (TX) (asst.)
- 2013–2018: Portland State (asst.)
- 2018–2021: Portland State (associate HC)
- 2021–present: Portland State

Head coaching record
- Overall: 82–75 (.522) (college); 74–39 (.655) (high school)

Accomplishments and honors

Championships
- Big Sky regular season (2026)

Awards
- Big Sky Coach of the Year (2026)

Jase Coburn (born September 16, 1983) is an American basketball coach who is currently the head coach at Portland State University. He was promoted in 2021 after eight seasons as an assistant with the program, and was a coach at the high school and junior college ranks before joining Portland State.

== Coaching career ==
Coburn got his start coaching at Corona del Sol High School in Tempe as an assistant before moving on to Phoenix Junior College as an assistant. He was named the head coach at McClintock High School in Tempe at the age of 23 in 2007 and led them to a state championship by the time he was 26. He was also an assistant at Howard Junior College in Texas before joining Portland State.

=== Portland State ===
Coburn was hired as an assistant coach at Portland State in 2013. He was elevated to associate head coach before the 2018 season.

Coburn was promoted to head coach in 2021 after Barret Peery left for an assistant position at Texas Tech.

== Head coaching record ==
=== College ===
Record table
Season	Team	Overall	Conference	Standing	Postseason
Portland State Vikings (Big Sky Conference) (2021–present)
2021–22	Portland State	14–17	10–10	7th	
2022–23	Portland State	12–19	6–11	7th	
2023–24	Portland State	17–15	8–10	6th	
2024–25	Portland State	19–13	11–7	T–3rd	
2025–26	Portland State	20–11	13–5	1st	
2026–27	Portland State	0–0	0–0		
Portland State:		82–75 (.522)	48–43 (.527)		
Total:		82–75 (.522)			
National champion Postseason invitational champion Conference regular season champion Conference regular season and conference tournament champion Division regular season champion Division regular season and conference tournament champion Conference tournament champion

=== High school ===
Record table
Season	Team	Overall	Conference	Standing	Postseason
McClintock HS Chargers (4A Division I) (2007–2011)
2007–08	McClintock HS	12–12	7–5	4th (4A Desert Sky)	
2008–09	McClintock HS	18–11	7–5	3rd (4A Desert Sky)	
2009–10	McClintock HS	25–6	8–0	1st (4A Desert Sky)	
2010–11	McClintock HS	19–10	11–3	2nd (4A Desert Sky)	
McClintock HS:		74–39 (.655)	33–13 (.717)		
Total:		74–39 (.655)			
National champion Postseason invitational champion Conference regular season champion Conference regular season and conference tournament champion Division regular season champion Division regular season and conference tournament champion Conference tournament champion
