= 2021–22 Northern Colorado Bears men's basketball team =

American college basketball season

2021–22 Northern Colorado Bears men's basketball
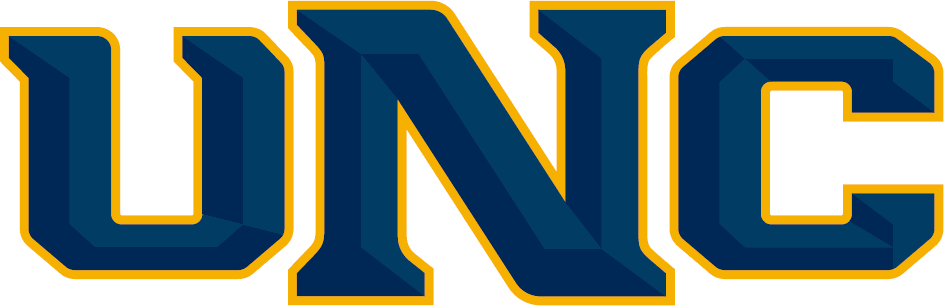

Rainbow Classic champions

CBI, Semifinals
- Conference: Big Sky Conference
- Record: 22–16 (13–7 Big Sky)
- Head coach: Steve Smiley (2nd season)
- Assistant coaches: Cory Fehringer; Dorian Green; Houston Reed
- Home arena: Bank of Colorado Arena

2021–22 Big Sky men's basketball standings
| | Conf. | | | | Overall |
| Team | W | | L | PCT | W | | L | PCT |
|---|---|---|---|---|---|---|---|---|
| Montana State † | 16 | – | 4 | .800 | 27 | – | 8 | .771 |
| Southern Utah | 14 | – | 6 | .700 | 23 | – | 12 | .657 |
| Northern Colorado | 13 | – | 7 | .650 | 22 | – | 16 | .579 |
| Weber State | 13 | – | 7 | .650 | 21 | – | 12 | .636 |
| Montana | 11 | – | 9 | .550 | 18 | – | 14 | .563 |
| Eastern Washington | 11 | – | 9 | .550 | 18 | – | 16 | .529 |
| Portland State | 10 | – | 10 | .500 | 14 | – | 17 | .452 |
| Sacramento State | 6 | – | 14 | .300 | 11 | – | 18 | .379 |
| Idaho | 6 | – | 14 | .300 | 9 | – | 22 | .290 |
| Idaho State | 5 | – | 15 | .250 | 7 | – | 23 | .233 |
| Northern Arizona | 5 | – | 15 | .250 | 9 | – | 23 | .281 |
† Conference tournament winner

The 2021–22 Northern Colorado Bears men's basketball team represented the University of Northern Colorado in the 2021–22 NCAA Division I men's basketball season. The Bears, led by second-year head coach Steve Smiley, played their home games at Bank of Colorado Arena in Greeley, Colorado as members of the Big Sky Conference.

== Previous season ==
The Bears finished the 2020–21 season 11–11, 6–8 in Big Sky play to finish in a tie for seventh place. As the #8 seed in the Big Sky tournament, they defeated #9 seed Sacramento State in the first round, before falling to top seeded Southern Utah in the quarterfinals.

== Roster ==
2021–22 Northern Colorado Bears men's basketball team
Players
Coaches

| Pos. | # | Name | Height | Weight | Year | Previous school | Hometown |
|---|---|---|---|---|---|---|---|
| G | 0 | Dru Kuxhausen | 5 ft 11 in (1.8 m) | 187 lb (85 kg) | GS | McNeese State | Scottsbluff, NE |
| G | 1 | Daylen Kountz | 6 ft 4 in (1.93 m) | 190 lb (86 kg) | Sr | Colorado | Denver, CO |
| G | 2 | Matt Johnson II | 6 ft 2 in (1.88 m) | 190 lb (86 kg) | RS Sr | Rangeview HS | Aurora, CO |
| G | 3 | Tre'Shon Smoots | 6 ft 1 in (1.85 m) | 190 lb (86 kg) | RS Jr | Grant HS | Sacramento, CA |
| G | 4 | Dawson Mohr | 6 ft 3 in (1.91 m) | 190 lb (86 kg) | Fr | IMG Academy | Scottsbluff, NE |
| G | 5 | Dalton Knecht | 6 ft 6 in (1.98 m) | 197 lb (89 kg) | Jr | Northeastern JC | Thornton, CO |
| F | 10 | Jamel Melvin | 6 ft 11 in (2.11 m) | 205 lb (93 kg) | So | The Potomac School | McLean, VA |
| G | 11 | Zach Bloch | 6 ft 1 in (1.85 m) | 165 lb (75 kg) | Fr | Colorado Prep | Lawrence, KS |
| G | 12 | Connor Creech | 6 ft 5 in (1.96 m) | 200 lb (91 kg) | So | Hastings HS | Hastings, NE |
| G | 13 | Bodie Hume | 6 ft 8 in (2.03 m) | 205 lb (93 kg) | Sr | Sterling HS | Sterling, CO |
| F | 15 | Kur Jongkuch | 6 ft 9 in (2.06 m) | 220 lb (100 kg) | Sr | London Basketball Academy | Ontario, Canada |
| F | 21 | Bryce Kennedy | 6 ft 7 in (2.01 m) | 200 lb (91 kg) | So | Allen HS | Allen, TX |
| G | 22 | Bailon Black | 6 ft 4 in (1.93 m) | 175 lb (79 kg) | Fr | Ironwood HS | Phoenix, AZ |
| G | 24 | Trent Hudgens Jr | 6 ft 0 in (1.83 m) | 163 lb (74 kg) | Fr | Santa Clara | Phoenix, AZ |
| G | 25 | Jalen Page | 6 ft 5 in (1.96 m) | 205 lb (93 kg) | So | Fairview HS | Boulder, CO |
| C | 32 | Theo Hughes | 7 ft 0 in (2.13 m) | 260 lb (118 kg) | So | Barking Abbey | Brentwood, England |

Head coach

- Steve Smiley (Northern State)

Assistant coach(es)

- Cory Fehringer (Hastings College)
- Dorian Green (Colorado State)
- Houston Reed (Northern State)

Legend

- (C) Team captain
- (S) Suspended
- (I) Ineligible
- (W) Walk-on
- Injured
- Current redshirt

Roster
Last update: October 31, 2021

== Schedule and results ==
| Date time, TV | Rank^{#} | Opponent^{#} | Result | Record | Site (attendance) city, state |
Regular season
| November 10, 2021*; 7:30 pm | | vs. Pacific; Outrigger Resorts Rainbow Classic | W 67–65 | 1–0 | Stan Sheriff Center; Honolulu, HI |
| November 11, 2021*; 10:00 pm, ESPN+ | | at Hawaii; Outrigger Resorts Rainbow Classic | W 81–78 | 2–0 | Stan Sheriff Center (2,110); Honolulu, HI |
| November 13, 2021*; 7:30 pm | | vs. Hawaii–Hilo; Outrigger Resorts Rainbow Classic | L 79–87 ^{OT} | 2–1 | Stan Sheriff Center; Honolulu, HI |
| November 15, 2021*; 6:00 pm, ESPN+ | | Colorado College | W 93–53 | 3–1 | Bank of Colorado Arena (890); Greeley, CO |
| November 17, 2021*; 6:30 pm, LHN | | at No. 8 Texas; Abe Lemons Classic | L 49–62 | 3–2 | Frank Erwin Center (11,083); Austin, TX |
| November 21, 2021*; 8:00 pm, ESPN+ | | at California Baptist; Abe Lemons Classic | L 70–74 | 3–3 | CBU Events Center (2,229); Riverside, CA |
| November 23, 2021*; 8:00 pm | | at San Jose State; Abe Lemons Classic | L 74–75 | 3–4 | Provident Credit Union Event Center (1,257); San Jose, CA |
| November 27, 2021*; 12:00 pm, KCDO | | at Colorado State | L 79–88 | 3–5 | Moby Arena (4,328); Fort Collins, CO |
| December 2, 2021; 6:00 pm, ESPN+ | | Montana State | W 77–75 | 4–5 (1–0) | Bank of Colorado Arena (1,191); Greeley, CO |
| December 4, 2021; 6:00 pm, ESPN+ | | Montana | W 78–75 | 5–5 (2–0) | Bank of Colorado Arena (1,178); Greeley, CO |
| December 7, 2021*; 6:00 pm, ESPN+ | | South Dakota | W 74–69 | 6–5 | Bank of Colorado Arena (1,115); Greeley, CO |
| December 15, 2021*; 7:00 pm, P12N | | at No. 8 Arizona | L 76–101 | 6–6 | McKale Center (11,943); Tucson, AZ |
| December 18, 2021*; 2:00 pm, P12N | | at Washington State | L 56–82 | 6–7 | Beasley Coliseum (2,438); Pullman, WA |
| December 21, 2021*; 6:00 pm, ESPN+ | | Northern New Mexico | W 90–54 | 7–7 | Bank of Colorado Arena (1,293); Greeley, CO |
| January 1, 2022; 7:00 pm, ESPN+ | | at Southern Utah | W 91–81 | 8–7 (3–0) | America First Event Center (865); Cedar City, UT |
| January 8, 2022; 2:00 pm, ESPN+ | | Sacramento State | L 71–85 | 8–8 (3–1) | Bank of Colorado Arena (1,204); Greeley, CO |
| January 20, 2022; 7:00 pm, ESPN+ | | at Idaho | W 87–70 | 9–8 (4–1) | Idaho Central Credit Union Arena (1,069); Moscow, ID |
| January 22, 2022; 3:00 pm, ESPN+ | | at Eastern Washington | W 87–83 | 10–8 (5–1) | Reese Court (1,102); Cheney, WA |
| January 27, 2022; 6:00 pm, ESPN+ | | Weber State | L 76–85 | 10–9 (5–2) | Bank of Colorado Arena (1,629); Greeley, CO |
| January 31, 2022; 8:30 pm, ESPN+ | | at Portland State; Rescheduled from January 10 | L 76–79 | 10–10 (5–3) | Viking Pavilion (989); Portland, OR |
| February 3, 2022; 6:00 pm, ESPN+ | | Portland State | L 99–106 | 10–11 (5–4) | Bank of Colorado Arena (888); Greeley, CO |
| February 5, 2022; 2:00 pm, ESPN+ | | at Northern Arizona | W 74–71 | 11–11 (6–4) | Walkup Skydome (1,239); Flagstaff, AZ |
| February 7, 2022; 7:30 pm, ESPN+ | | Northern Arizona; Rescheduled from January 15 | W 82–60 | 12–11 (7–4) | Bank of Colorado Arena (802); Greeley, CO |
| February 10, 2022; 8:00 pm, ESPN+ | | at Sacramento State | W 79–61 | 13–11 (8–4) | Hornets Nest (916); Sacramento, CA |
| February 14, 2022; 6:00 pm, ESPN+ | | Southern Utah | W 100–95 | 14–11 (9–4) | Bank of Colorado Arena (1,024); Greeley, CO |
| February 17, 2022; 7:00 pm, ESPN+ | | at Idaho State | L 58–61 | 14–12 (9–5) | Reed Gym (1,088); Pocatello, ID |
| February 19, 2022; 6:00 pm, ESPN+ | | at Weber State | W 83–79 ^{OT} | 15–12 (10–5) | Dee Events Center (5,543); Ogden, UT |
| February 21, 2022; 6:00 pm, ESPN+ | | Idaho State; Rescheduled from January 29 | W 77–70 | 16–12 (11–5) | Bank of Colorado Arena (1,136); Greeley, CO |
| February 24, 2022; 6:00 pm, ESPN+ | | Eastern Washington | L 76–85 | 16–13 (11–6) | Bank of Colorado Arena (1,004); Greeley, CO |
| February 26, 2022; 6:00 pm, ESPN+ | | Idaho | W 98–94 | 17–13 (12–6) | Bank of Colorado Arena (1,421); Greeley, CO |
| March 3, 2022; 7:00 pm, ESPN+ | | at Montana | W 75–66 | 18–13 (13–6) | Dahlberg Arena (3,278); Missoula, MT |
| March 5, 2022; 4:00 pm, ESPN+ | | at Montana State | L 85–87 | 18–14 (13–7) | Brick Breeden Fieldhouse (4,217); Bozeman, MT |
Big Sky tournament
| March 10, 2022; 8:00 pm, ESPN+ | (3) | vs. (6) Eastern Washington; Quarterfinals | W 68–67 | 19–14 | Idaho Central Arena (2,022); Boise, ID |
| March 11, 2022; 8:00 pm, ESPN+ | (3) | vs. (7) Portland State; Semifinals | W 86–79 | 20–14 | Idaho Central Arena (3,037); Boise, ID |
| March 12, 2022; 6:00 pm, ESPNU | (3) | vs. (1) Montana State; Championship | L 66–87 | 20–15 | Idaho Central Arena; Boise, ID |
College Basketball Invitational
| March 20, 2022; 12:30 pm, FloHoops | (12) | vs. (5) Florida Atlantic; First Round | W 74–71 | 21–15 | Ocean Center (762); Daytona Beach, FL |
| March 21, 2022; 3:30 pm, FloHoops | (12) | vs. (13) UNC Asheville; Quarterfinals | W 87–84 | 22–15 | Ocean Center (706); Daytona Beach, FL |
| March 22, 2022; 5:00 pm, ESPN2 | (12) | vs. (9) UNC Wilmington; Semifinals | L 64–80 | 22–16 | Ocean Center (633); Daytona Beach, FL |
*Non-conference game. ^{#}Rankings from AP Poll. (#) Tournament seedings in parentheses. All times are in Mountain.
