= 2021–22 Northern Arizona Lumberjacks men's basketball team =

American college basketball season

2021–22 Northern Arizona Lumberjacks men's basketball
- Conference: Big Sky Conference
- Record: 9–23 (5–15 Big Sky)
- Head coach: Shane Burcar (3rd season)
- Assistant coaches: Tyler Ojanen; Chris Fowler; Jake Ricciardi
- Home arena: Rolle Activity Center; Walkup Skydome

2021–22 Big Sky men's basketball standings
	Conf.				Overall
Team	W		L	PCT	W		L	PCT
Montana State †	16	–	4	.800	27	–	8	.771
Southern Utah	14	–	6	.700	23	–	12	.657
Northern Colorado	13	–	7	.650	22	–	16	.579
Weber State	13	–	7	.650	21	–	12	.636
Montana	11	–	9	.550	18	–	14	.563
Eastern Washington	11	–	9	.550	18	–	16	.529
Portland State	10	–	10	.500	14	–	17	.452
Sacramento State	6	–	14	.300	11	–	18	.379
Idaho	6	–	14	.300	9	–	22	.290
Idaho State	5	–	15	.250	7	–	23	.233
Northern Arizona	5	–	15	.250	9	–	23	.281
† Conference tournament winner

The 2021–22 Northern Arizona Lumberjacks men's basketball team represented Northern Arizona University in the 2021–22 NCAA Division I men's basketball season. The Lumberjacks were led by third-year head coach Shane Burcar, and played their home games at the Rolle Activity Center in Flagstaff, Arizona as members of the Big Sky Conference. They finished the season 9–23, 5–15 in Big Sky play, to finish in a tie for tenth (last) place. As the No. 11 seed in the Big Sky tournament, they lost to Eastern Washington in the first round.

== Previous season ==
In a season limited due to the ongoing COVID-19 pandemic, the Lumberjacks finished the 2020–21 season 6–16 overall, 4–10 in Big Sky play, to finish in a tie for tenth place. In the Big Sky Conference tournament, they defeated Portland State in the first round before losing to Eastern Washington.

== Offseason ==
=== Departures ===
Name	Number	Pos.	Height	Weight	Year	Hometown	Reason for departure
Davy Cummard	3	G	6' 0"	210	RS Junior	Mesa, AZ	Walk-on; left the team for personal reasons
Charles Burns	5	G	6' 1"	150	Sophomore	Lolo, MT	Walk-on; left the team for personal reasons
Olgierd Dmochewicz	10	F	6' 11"	210	Freshman	Konstancin-Jeziorna, Poland	Transferred to Chadron State
Jackson Larsen	11	F	6' 7"	190	RS Freshman	El Cajon, CA	Walk-on; transferred to San Diego City College
Cameron Shelton	20	G	6' 2"	175	Junior	Chino, CA	Graduate transferred to Loyola Marymount Lions
Luke Avdalovic	21	G	6' 5"	190	RS Junior	Folsom, CA	Graduate transferred to Pacific

=== Incoming transfers ===
Name	Number	Pos.	Height	Weight	Year	Hometown	Previous school
Mason Stark	11	G	6' 2"	170	RS Junior	Chandler, AZ	Northern State
Jalen Cone	15	G	5' 10"	165	Sophomore	Walkertown, NC	Virginia Tech
Ezekiel Richards	23	C	6' 10"	240	RS Sophomore	Oak Park, CA	Santa Clara
Spencer Roberts	34	C	6' 9"		Junior	Alberta, Canada	College of Southern Idaho

=== 2021 incoming recruits ===
College recruiting information
Name	Hometown	School	Height	Weight	Commit date
Jayden Jackson; SG	Milwaukee, WI	Whitefish Bay High School	6 ft 3 in (1.91 m)	180 lb (82 kg)	Aug 29, 2020
Jayden Jackson; SG	Recruit ratings: No ratings found				
Colin Carey; SF	Peoria, AZ	Sunrise Mountain High School	6 ft 6 in (1.98 m)	200 lb (91 kg)	Jul 30, 2019
Colin Carey; SF	Recruit ratings: No ratings found				
Wynton Brown; PF	Bellflower, CA	St. John Bosco High School	6 ft 8 in (2.03 m)	215 lb (98 kg)	Jul 28, 2019
Wynton Brown; PF	Recruit ratings: No ratings found				
Overall recruit ranking:
Note: In many cases, Scout, Rivals, 247Sports, On3, and ESPN may conflict in their listings of height and weight.; In these cases, the average was taken. ESPN grades are on a 100-point scale.; Sources: "2021 Team Ranking". Rivals.

=== 2022 incoming recruits ===
College recruiting information (2022)
Name	Hometown	School	Height	Weight	Commit date
Oakland Fort; PG	Phoenix, AZ	Sunnyslope High School	5 ft 10 in (1.78 m)	180 lb (82 kg)	Sep 30, 2021
Oakland Fort; PG	Recruit ratings: No ratings found				
C.J. Ford; PG	Duncanville, TX	Duncanville High School	5 ft 11 in (1.80 m)	160 lb (73 kg)	Sep 23, 2021
C.J. Ford; PG	Recruit ratings: No ratings found				
Ryan Abelman; SG	Las Vegas, NV	Bishop Gorman High School	6 ft 2 in (1.88 m)	N/A	Jun 27, 2021
Ryan Abelman; SG	Recruit ratings: No ratings found				
Will Coates; SF	Phoenix, AZ	PHH Prep	6 ft 8 in (2.03 m)	N/A	Sep 27, 2021
Will Coates; SF	Recruit ratings: No ratings found				
Jack Wistrcill; PF	Salt Lake City, UT	Olympus High School	6 ft 8 in (2.03 m)	225 lb (102 kg)	Jul 14, 2021
Jack Wistrcill; PF	Recruit ratings: No ratings found				
Overall recruit ranking:
Note: In many cases, Scout, Rivals, 247Sports, On3, and ESPN may conflict in their listings of height and weight.; In these cases, the average was taken. ESPN grades are on a 100-point scale.; Sources: "2022 Team Ranking". Rivals.

== Roster ==
2021–22 Northern Arizona Lumberjacks men's basketball team
Players
Coaches

Pos.	#	Name	Height	Weight	Year	Previous school	Hometown
G	1	Jay Green	6 ft 5 in (1.96 m)	205 lb (93 kg)	RS Jr	Hillcrest Prep; UNLV	Sydney, Australia
F	2	Ajang Aguek	6 ft 8 in (2.03 m)	195 lb (88 kg)	So	Ironwood	Glendale, AZ
G	3	Jayden Jackson	6 ft 4 in (1.93 m)	195 lb (88 kg)	Fr	Whitefish Bay	Milwaukee, WI
G	4	Carter Mahaney	6 ft 2 in (1.88 m)	185 lb (84 kg)	Fr	Campolindo	Lafayette, CA
G	11	Mason Stark	6 ft 2 in (1.88 m)	170 lb (77 kg)	RS Jr	Marcos de Niza; Northern State	Chandler, AZ
F	12	Diego Campisano (W)	6 ft 5 in (1.96 m)	210 lb (95 kg)	Fr	Torrey Pines	San Diego, CA
F	13	Keith Haymon	6 ft 7 in (2.01 m)	200 lb (91 kg)	RS So	Cypress Ranch	Cypress, TX
G	14	Isaiah Lewis	6 ft 6 in (1.98 m)	205 lb (93 kg)	So	Lone Star	Little Elm, TX
G	15	Jalen Cone	5 ft 10 in (1.78 m)	165 lb (75 kg)	So	Walkertown; Virginia Tech	Walkertown, NC
F	20	Nik Mains	6 ft 9 in (2.06 m)	205 lb (93 kg)	RS Jr	Pinnacle	Scottsdale, AZ
F	22	Wynton Brown	6 ft 8 in (2.03 m)	215 lb (98 kg)	Fr	St. John Bosco	Bellflower, CA
C	23	Ezekiel Richards	6 ft 10 in (2.08 m)	230 lb (104 kg)	RS So	Oak Park; Santa Clara	Oak Park, CA
G	24	Colin Carey	6 ft 5 in (1.96 m)	190 lb (86 kg)	Fr	Sunrise Mountain	Peoria, AZ
F	33	Carson Towt	6 ft 7 in (2.01 m)	230 lb (104 kg)	RS Fr	Gilbert; Cal Baptist	Gilbert, AZ
F	34	Spencer Roberts	6 ft 8 in (2.03 m)	240 lb (109 kg)	Jr	Raymond; College of Southern Idaho	Alberta, Canada

Head coach

- Shane Burcar

Assistant coach(es)

- Jake Ricciardi (Memphis)
- Tyler Ojanen (Cal Baptist)
- Chris Fowler (Central Michigan)

Legend

- (C) Team captain
- (S) Suspended
- (I) Ineligible
- (W) Walk-on
- Injured
- Current redshirt

Roster
Last update: November 4, 2024

== Schedule and results ==
Date time, TV	Rank^{#}	Opponent^{#}	Result	Record	Site (attendance) city, state
Regular season
November 9, 2021*; 8:30 p.m., P12N		at Arizona	L 52–81	0–1	McKale Center (12,471); Tucson, AZ
November 11, 2021*; 8:30 p.m., P12N		at Washington	L 62–73	0–2	Alaska Airlines Arena (6,297); Seattle, WA
November 15, 2021*; 6:00 p.m., ESPN+		Benedictine Mesa	W 97–48	1–2	Rolle Activity Center (625); Flagstaff, AZ
November 18, 2021*; 6:00 p.m., ESPN+		Cal State Bakersfield	W 74–64	2–2	Rolle Activity Center (567); Flagstaff, AZ
November 20, 2021*; 12:00 p.m., ESPN+		vs. Texas–Rio Grande Valley; South Padre Island Battle on the Beach	W 89–87	3–2	South Padre Island Convention Centre (1,340); South Padre Island, TX
November 22, 2021*; 6:00 p.m., ESPN+		Texas–Rio Grande Valley	L 80–82	3–3	Rolle Activity Center (400); Flagstaff, AZ
November 24, 2021*; 6:00 p.m., ESPN+		Cal State Fullerton	L 56–73	3–4	Rolle Activity Center (278); Flagstaff, AZ
December 2, 2021; 7:00 p.m., ESPN+		at Weber State	L 44-67	3–5 (0–1)	Dee Events Center (2,522); Ogden, UT
December 4, 2021; 6:00 p.m., ESPN+		at Idaho State	W 73–70	4–5 (1–1)	Reed Gym (1,094); Pocatello, ID
December 11, 2021*; 2:30 p.m.		at South Dakota	L 71–76 ^{OT}	4–6	Sanford Coyote Sports Center (1,832); Vermillion, SD
December 18, 2021*; 8:00 p.m., FloSports		vs. San Diego; Jerry Colangelo Classic	L 59–69	4–7	Footprint Center (1,578); Phoenix, AZ
December 20, 2021*; 7:00 p.m., RTNW		at No. 4 Gonzaga	L 49–95	4–8	McCarthey Athletic Center (6,000); Spokane, WA
January 1, 2022; 2:00 p.m., ESPN+		Eastern Washington	L 65–78	4–9 (1–2)	Walkup Skydome (161); Flagstaff, AZ
January 5, 2022*; 6:00 p.m., ESPN+		Embry–Riddle	W 101–54	5–9	Walkup Skydome (205); Flagstaff, AZ
January 17, 2021; 6:00 p.m., ESPN+		Idaho; Rescheduled from December 30	W 74–72	6–9 (2–2)	Walkup Skydome (418); Flagstaff, AZ
January 20, 2022; 6:00 p.m., ESPN+		Montana State	L 84–89	6–10 (2–3)	Walkup Skydome (840); Flagstaff, AZ
January 22, 2022; 2:00 p.m., ESPN+		at Montana	L 48–58	6–11 (2–4)	Walkup Skydome (736); Flagstaff, AZ
January 24, 2022; 6:00 p.m., ESPN+		Sacramento State; Rescheduled from January 10	W 70–65	7–11 (3–4)	Walkup Skydome (547); Flagstaff, AZ
January 29, 2022; 2:00 p.m., ESPN+		Portland State	L 76–97	7–12 (3–5)	Walkup Skydome (1,204); Flagstaff, AZ
January 31, 2022; 5:00 p.m., ESPN+		at Southern Utah; Rescheduled from January 8	L 66–78	7–13 (3–6)	America First Event Center (1,239); Cedar City, UT
February 3, 2022; 8:00 p.m., ESPN+		at Sacramento State	W 62–61	8–13 (4–6)	Hornets Nest (534); Sacramento, CA
February 5, 2022; 2:00 p.m., ESPN+		Northern Colorado	L 71–74	8–14 (4–7)	Walkup Skydome (1,239); Flagstaff, AZ
February 7, 2022; 7:30 p.m., ESPN+		at Northern Colorado; Rescheduled from January 15	L 60–82	8–15 (4–8)	Bank of Colorado Arena (802); Greeley, CO
February 10, 2022; 7:00 p.m., ESPN+		Montana	W 72–67 ^{OT}	9–15 (5–8)	Dahlberg Arena (3,037); Missoula, MT
February 12, 2022; 2:00 p.m., ESPN+		at Montana State	L 70–72	9–16 (5–9)	Brick Breeden Fieldhouse (3,803); Bozeman, MT
February 17, 2022; 8:00 p.m., ESPN+		at Portland State	L 67–68	9–17 (5–10)	Viking Pavilion (895); Portland, OR
February 21, 2022; 6:00 p.m., ESPN+		Southern Utah	L 48–79	9–18 (5–11)	Walkup Skydome (903); Flagstaff, AZ
February 24, 2022; 6:00 p.m., ESPN+		Idaho State	L 66–70	9–19 (5–12)	Walkup Skydome (577); Flagstaff, AZ
February 26, 2022; 2:00 p.m., ESPN+		Weber State	L 49–73	9–20 (5–13)	Walkup Skydome (1,056); Flagstaff, AZ
March 3, 2022; 7:00 p.m., ESPN+		at Eastern Washington	L 62–69	9–21 (5–14)	Reese Court (1,182); Cheney, WA
March 5, 2022; 3:00 p.m., ESPN+		at Idaho	L 69–78	9–22 (5–15)	ICCU Arena (1,442); Moscow, ID
Big Sky tournament
March 9, 2022; 2:30 p.m., ESPN+	(11)	vs. (6) Eastern Washington; First round	L 75–78	9–23	Idaho Central Arena (1175); Boise, ID
*Non-conference game. ^{#}Rankings from AP Poll. (#) Tournament seedings in parentheses. All times are in Mountain.
