= 2021–22 UNC Wilmington Seahawks men's basketball team =

American college basketball season

2021–22 UNC Wilmington Seahawks men's basketball

CAA regular season co-champions

CBI champions
- Conference: Colonial Athletic Association
- Record: 27–9 (15–3 CAA)
- Head coach: Takayo Siddle (2nd season)
- Assistant coaches: Travis Hackert; Kurt Kanaskie; Craig Ponder
- Home arena: Trask Coliseum

2021–22 CAA men's basketball standings
	Conf.				Overall
Team	W		L	PCT	W		L	PCT
Towson	15	–	3	.833	25	–	9	.735
UNC Wilmington	15	–	3	.833	27	–	9	.750
Hofstra	13	–	5	.722	21	–	11	.656
Drexel	10	–	8	.556	15	–	14	.517
Delaware †	10	–	8	.556	22	–	13	.629
Charleston	8	–	10	.444	17	–	15	.531
Elon	7	–	11	.389	10	–	22	.313
James Madison*	6	–	12	.333	15	–	14	.517
William & Mary	4	–	14	.222	5	–	27	.156
Northeastern	2	–	16	.111	9	–	22	.290
† 2022 CAA tournament winner *Ineligible for conference tournament due to changing conferences in 2022

The 2021–22 UNC Wilmington Seahawks men's basketball team represented the University of North Carolina Wilmington during the 2021–22 NCAA Division I men's basketball season. The Seahawks are led by second-year head coach Takayo Siddle. They played their home games at Trask Coliseum as part of the Colonial Athletic Association. They finished the season 27–9, 15–3 in CAA play to finish in a tie for the regular season championship with Towson. The Seahawks defeated Elon and Charleston in the CAA tournament before losing to Delaware in the championship game. They received a bid to the College Basketball Invitational tournament as the No. 9 seed. They defeated VMI, Drake, Northern Colorado, and Middle Tennessee to win the CBI championship.

== Previous season ==
In a season limited due to the ongoing COVID-19 pandemic, the Seahawks finished the 2020–21 season with a 7–10 record and 1–6 in conference play. They lost to William & Mary in the first round of the CAA tournament .

== Roster ==
2021–22 UNC Wilmington Seahawks men's basketball team
Players
Coaches

Pos.	#	Name	Height	Weight	Year	Previous school	Hometown
G	0	Jamarii Thomas	6 ft 0 in (1.83 m)	185 lb (84 kg)	Fr	The Burlington School	Greensboro, NC
G	1	Jaylen Fornes	6 ft 3 in (1.91 m)	195 lb (88 kg)	GS	Word of God/Nicholls State	Pamlico County, NC
G	2	Shykeim Phillips	6 ft 2 in (1.88 m)	180 lb (82 kg)	Jr	South Central HS	Winterville, NC
G	3	James Baker Jr.	6 ft 7 in (2.01 m)	205 lb (93 kg)	GS	Meade County HS/Morehead State	Louisville, KY
G	4	Mike Okauru	6 ft 4 in (1.93 m)	190 lb (86 kg)	GS	Brewster Academy/Florida	Raleigh, NC
G	10	Jamahri Harvey	6 ft 5 in (1.96 m)	175 lb (79 kg)	So	Moravian Prep	Fayetteville, NC
F	13	Trazarien White	6 ft 6 in (1.98 m)	180 lb (82 kg)	Fr	Timberview HS/Collin College	Mansfield, TX
G	14	Alec Ogelsby	6 ft 5 in (1.96 m)	195 lb (88 kg)	So	The Rock School/Cleveland State	Lawrenceville, GA
G	20	Logan Morrissey	6 ft 4 in (1.93 m)	200 lb (91 kg)	Fr	Plant HS/Air Force	Tampa, FL
F	21	Khamari McGriff	6 ft 8 in (2.03 m)	175 lb (79 kg)	Fr	James S. Rickards HS	Tallahassee, FL
G	22	Khadim Samb	6 ft 7 in (2.01 m)	200 lb (91 kg)	Jr	Sprayberry HS/Idaho/Garden City CC	Marietta, GA
F	23	Amari Kelly	6 ft 9 in (2.06 m)	230 lb (104 kg)	Jr	Meadowcreek HS/Duquesne	Norcross, GA
G	24	Makoa Surigao	6 ft 2 in (1.88 m)	185 lb (84 kg)	Fr	Laney HS	Wilmington, NC
G	30	Jaylen Sims	6 ft 6 in (1.98 m)	210 lb (95 kg)	Sr	United Faith Christian Academy	Charlotte, NC

Head coach

- Takayo Siddle (Gardner–Webb)

Assistant coach(es)

- Travis Hackert (Louisville)
- Kurt Kanaskie (La Salle)
- Craig Ponder (UNC Wilmington)

Legend

- (C) Team captain
- (S) Suspended
- (I) Ineligible
- (W) Walk-on
- Injured
- Current redshirt

Roster
Last update: December 1, 2021

== Schedule and results ==
Date time, TV	Rank^{#}	Opponent^{#}	Result	Record	Site (attendance) city, state
Exhibition
November 4, 2021*; 7:00 pm, FloHoops		Francis Marion	W 101–72	–	Trask Coliseum (2,133); Wilmington, NC
Non-conference regular season
November 9, 2021*; 8:00 pm, ESPN+		Illinois State	L 63–68	0–1	Redbird Arena (2,642); Normal, IL
November 12, 2021*; 7:00 pm, FloHoops		Guilford	W 77–68	1–1	Trask Coliseum (3,229); Wilmington, NC
November 16, 2021*; 7:00 pm, ACCN		at Pittsburgh	L 51–59	1–2	Petersen Events Center (7,261); Pittsburgh, PA
November 18, 2021*; 7:00 pm, FloHoops		Coastal Carolina	W 65–53	2–2	Trask Coliseum (4,101); Wilmington, NC
November 20, 2021*; 4:00 pm		at Delaware State	W 67–63	3–2	Memorial Hall (485); Dover, DE
November 24, 2021*; 7:00 pm		vs. Southern Miss; Zootown Classic	L 66–80	3–3	Dahlberg Arena; Missoula, MT
November 25, 2021*; 9:30 pm		vs. Montana; Zootown Classic	Canceled due to flu outbreak		Dahlberg Arena; Missoula, MT
November 26, 2021*; 7:00 pm		vs. UC San Diego; Zootown Classic	Canceled due to flu outbreak		Dahlberg Arena; Missoula, MT
December 1, 2021*; 7:00 pm, FloHoops		Norfolk State	L 69–74	3–4	Trask Coliseum (3,067); Wilmington, NC
December 11, 2021*; 3:00 pm, ESPN+		at Jacksonville	L 48–77	3–5	Swisher Gymnasium (68); Jacksonville, FL
December 15, 2021*; 7:00 pm, FloHoops		Mount Olive	W 85–55	4–5	Trask Coliseum (2,172); Wilmington, NC
December 18, 2021*; 2:00 pm, ESPN+		at High Point	W 71–69 ^{OT}	5–5	Qubein Center (2,334); High Point, NC
December 22, 2021*; 12:00 pm, FloHoops		Campbell	W 65–58	6–5	Trask Coliseum (2,378); Wilmington, NC
CAA regular season
December 29, 2021; 7:00 pm, FloHoops		Delaware	W 70–68	7–5 (1–0)	Trask Coliseum (2,959); Wilmington, NC
January 12, 2022; 7:00 pm, FloHoops		Elon	W 73–66	8–5 (2–0)	Trask Coliseum (2,595); Wilmington, NC
January 17, 2022; 7:00 pm, FloHoops		at Charleston	W 86–78	9–5 (3–0)	TD Arena (3,844); Charleston, SC
January 20, 2022; 7:00 pm, FloHoops		at James Madison	W 71–70	10–5 (4–0)	Atlantic Union Bank Center (3,878); Harrisonburg, VA
January 22, 2022; 2:00 pm, FloHoops		at Towson	W 81–77 ^{OT}	11–5 (5–0)	SECU Arena (1,273); Towson, MD
January 24, 2022; 7:00 pm, FloHoops		at Northeastern; Rescheduled from January 5	W 74–68	12–5 (6–0)	Matthews Arena (564); Boston, MA
January 27, 2022; 7:00 pm, FloHoops		Northeastern	W 67–62	13–5 (7–0)	Trask Coliseum (4,146); Wilmington, NC
January 29, 2022; 7:00 pm, FloHoops		Hofstra	W 78–72	14–5 (8–0)	Trask Coliseum (4,206); Wilmington, NC
January 31, 2022; 7:00 pm, FloHoops		Drexel; Rescheduled from December 31	W 70–63	15–5 (9–0)	Trask Coliseum (4,310); Wilmington, NC
February 3, 2022; 7:00 pm, FloHoops		at Elon	L 65–78	15–6 (9–1)	Schar Center (2,405); Elon, NC
February 5, 2022; 4:00 pm, CBSSN		at William & Mary	W 92–70	16–6 (10–1)	Kaplan Arena (3,885); Williamsburg, VA
February 7, 2022; 5:00 pm, CBSSN		at Hofstra; Rescheduled from January 3	L 71–73	16–7 (10–2)	Mack Sports Complex (1,359); Hempstead, NY
February 12, 2022; 7:00 pm, FloHoops		Charleston	W 85–79	17–7 (11–2)	Trask Coliseum (5,250); Wilmington, NC
February 14, 2022; 2:00 pm, FloHoops		William & Mary; Rescheduled from January 9	W 80–73 ^{OT}	18–7 (12–2)	Trask Coliseum (3,020); Wilmington, NC
February 17, 2022; 7:00 pm, FloHoops		Towson	L 55–79	18–8 (12–3)	Trask Coliseum (4,411); Wilmington, NC
February 19, 2022; 7:00 pm, FloHoops		James Madison	W 78–77 ^{OT}	19–8 (13–3)	Trask Coliseum (5,250); Wilmington, NC
February 24, 2022; 7:00 pm, FloHoops		at Drexel	W 69–63	20–8 (14–3)	Daskalakis Athletic Center (690); Philadelphia, PA
February 26, 2022; 4:00 pm, FloHoops		at Delaware	W 69–62	21–8 (15–3)	Bob Carpenter Center (2,794); Newark, DE
CAA tournament
March 6, 2022; 6:00 pm, FloHoops	(2)	vs. (7) Elon; Quarterfinals	W 75–58	22–8	Entertainment and Sports Arena (1,578); Washington, D.C.
March 7, 2022; 8:30 pm, CBSSN	(2)	vs. (6) Charleston; Semifinals	W 60–57	23–8	Entertainment and Sports Arena (1,707); Washington, D.C.
March 8, 2022; 7:00 pm, CBSSN	(2)	vs. (5) Delaware; Championship	L 55–59	23–9	Entertainment and Sports Arena (1,869); Washington, D.C.
CBI
March 20, 2022; 12:00 pm, FloHoops	(9)	vs. (8) VMI; First Round	W 93–78	24–9	Ocean Center; Daytona Beach, FL
March 21, 2022; 1:00 pm, FloHoops	(9)	vs. (1) Drake; Quarterfinals	W 76–75	25–9	Ocean Center (706); Daytona Beach, FL
March 22, 2022; 7:00 pm, ESPN2	(9)	vs. (12) Northern Colorado; Semifinals	W 80–64	26–9	Ocean Center (633); Daytona Beach, FL
March 23, 2022; 5:00 pm, ESPN2	(9)	vs. (2) Middle Tennessee; Championship	W 96–90 ^{2OT}	27–9	Ocean Center (624); Daytona Beach, FL
*Non-conference game. ^{#}Rankings from AP poll. (#) Tournament seedings in parentheses. All times are in Eastern Time.
