= 2021–22 Portland State Vikings men's basketball team =

American college basketball season

2021–22 Portland State Vikings men's basketball
- Conference: Big Sky Conference
- Record: 14–17 (10–10 Big Sky)
- Head coach: Jase Coburn (1st season)
- Assistant coaches: Matt Dunn; Jamaal Williams; Chris Foss
- Home arena: Viking Pavilion

2021–22 Big Sky men's basketball standings
	Conf.				Overall
Team	W		L	PCT	W		L	PCT
Montana State †	16	–	4	.800	27	–	8	.771
Southern Utah	14	–	6	.700	23	–	12	.657
Northern Colorado	13	–	7	.650	22	–	16	.579
Weber State	13	–	7	.650	21	–	12	.636
Montana	11	–	9	.550	18	–	14	.563
Eastern Washington	11	–	9	.550	18	–	16	.529
Portland State	10	–	10	.500	14	–	17	.452
Sacramento State	6	–	14	.300	11	–	18	.379
Idaho	6	–	14	.300	9	–	22	.290
Idaho State	5	–	15	.250	7	–	23	.233
Northern Arizona	5	–	15	.250	9	–	23	.281
† Conference tournament winner

The 2021–22 Portland State Vikings men's basketball team represented Portland State University in the 2021–22 NCAA Division I men's basketball season. The Vikings, led by first-year head coach Jase Coburn, played their home games at Viking Pavilion in Portland, Oregon as members of the Big Sky Conference.

== Previous season ==
The Vikings finished the 2020–21 season 9–13, 6–8 in Big Sky play to finish in a tie for seventh place. They lost to Northern Arizona in the first round of the Big Sky tournament.

On April 6, 2021, head coach Barret Peery left the team to take the associate head coaching position at Texas Tech. On April 16, after being named interim head coach following Peery's departure, associate head coach Jase Coburn was named the permanent head coach.

== Roster ==
2021–22 Portland State Vikings men's basketball team
Players
Coaches

Pos.	#	Name	Height	Weight	Year	Previous school	Hometown
G	0	Damion Squire	6 ft 1 in (1.85 m)	180 lb (82 kg)	Jr	UC Davis	Montreal, Quebec, Canada
F	1	James Jean-Marie	6 ft 8 in (2.03 m)	235 lb (107 kg)	Sr	Hawaii	Montreal, Quebec, Canada
G	2	Ian Burke	6 ft 5 in (1.96 m)	190 lb (86 kg)	Jr	Seattle	Phoenix, AZ
G	3	Ezekiel Alley	6 ft 1 in (1.85 m)	180 lb (82 kg)	Sr	Northwest Nazarene	Tucson, AZ
G	4	Paris Dawson	6 ft 2 in (1.88 m)	170 lb (77 kg)	Fr	Centennial HS	Carson, CA
G	5	Michael Carter III	6 ft 5 in (1.96 m)	175 lb (79 kg)	Jr	Long Beach State	Seattle, WA
F	10	Hayden Curtiss	6 ft 9 in (2.06 m)	220 lb (100 kg)	Fr	Portland	North Bend, WA
F	12	Trey Wood	6 ft 8 in (2.03 m)	210 lb (95 kg)	So	Anthem Prep	Anthem, AZ
G	14	Alexis Angeles	6 ft 2 in (1.88 m)	185 lb (84 kg)	Jr	Lower Columbia College	Tualatin, OR
G	15	Gio Nelson	6 ft 5 in (1.96 m)	205 lb (93 kg)	Jr	Arizona Western	Riverside, CA
G	22	Marlon Ruffin	6 ft 5 in (1.96 m)	195 lb (88 kg)	Jr	Omaha	Madison, WI
F	23	Khalid Thomas	6 ft 10 in (2.08 m)	210 lb (95 kg)	Sr	Arizona State	Salem, OR
G	30	Kiimani Holt	6 ft 4 in (1.93 m)	220 lb (100 kg)	Fr	PHH Prep	Phoenix, AZ
F	32	Jacob Eyman	6 ft 10 in (2.08 m)	235 lb (107 kg)	So	Fullerton College	Los Alamitos, CA
G	33	Mikal Starks	6 ft 1 in (1.85 m)	185 lb (84 kg)	Jr	Georgia	Miami, FL

Head coach

- Jase Coburn (Arizona State)

Assistant coach(es)

- Matt Dunn (Fort Hays State)
- Jamaal Williams (Washington)
- Chris Foss (Oregon)

Legend

- (C) Team captain
- (S) Suspended
- (I) Ineligible
- (W) Walk-on
- Injured
- Current redshirt

Roster
Last update: November 2, 2021

== Schedule and results ==
Date time, TV	Rank^{#}	Opponent^{#}	Result	Record	Site (attendance) city, state
Regular season
November 9, 2021*; 7:30 pm, P12N		at Oregon State	L 64–73	0–1	Gill Coliseum (4,448); Corvallis, OR
November 12, 2021*; 7:30 pm, ESPN+		Evergreen State	W 100–44	1–1	Viking Pavilion (663); Portland, OR
November 17, 2021*; 7:00 pm, ESPN+		George Fox	W 104–58	2–1	Viking Pavilion (774); Portland, OR
November 23, 2021*; 7:00 pm, KRCW/ESPN+		Portland	L 54–69	2–2	Viking Pavilion (1,352); Portland, OR
November 26, 2021*; 4:00 pm, BTN+		at Iowa	L 51–85	2–3	Carver–Hawkeye Arena (11,756); Iowa City, IA
December 2, 2021; 6:00 pm, ESPN+		at Idaho State	W 63–55	3–3 (1–0)	Reed Gym (1,102); Pocatello, ID
December 4, 2021; 5:00 pm, ESPN+		at Weber State	L 69–80	3–4 (1–1)	Dee Events Center (3,923); Ogden, UT
December 11, 2021*; 7:00 pm, ESPN+		Cal Poly	L 58-61	3–5	Viking Pavilion (812); Portland, OR
December 18, 2021*; 7:00 pm, ESPN+		at Cal State Northridge	L 66-69	3–6	Matadome (400); Northridge, CA
December 21, 2021*; 6:00 pm		at Utah State	L 62-81	3–7	Smith Spectrum (6,945); Logan, UT
December 30, 2021; 7:00 pm, ESPN+		Eastern Washington	L 58–63	3–8 (1–2)	Viking Pavilion (717); Portland, OR
January 15, 2022; 2:00 pm, ESPN+		at Sacramento State	W 67–62	4–8 (2–2)	Hornets Nest (498); Sacramento, CA
January 17, 2022; 6:00 pm, ESPN+		at Southern Utah; Rescheduled from January 6	L 76–86	4–9 (2–3)	America First Event Center (1,811); Cedar City, UT
January 20, 2022; 7:00 pm, ESPN+		Montana	L 64–66	4–10 (2–4)	Viking Pavilion (954); Portland, OR
January 22, 2022; 7:00 pm, ESPN+		Montana State	L 60–73	4–11 (2–5)	Viking Pavilion (1,496); Portland, OR
January 24, 2022; 7:00 pm, ESPN+		Idaho; Rescheduled from January 1	L 79–84	4–12 (2–6)	Viking Pavilion (563); Portland, OR
January 27, 2022; 7:00 pm, ESPN+		Southern Utah	L 82–85 ^{OT}	4–13 (2–7)	Viking Pavilion (784); Portland, OR
January 29, 2022; 1:00 pm, ESPN+		at Northern Arizona	W 97–76	5–13 (3–7)	Walkup Skydome (1,204); Flagstaff, AZ
January 31, 2022; 7:30 pm, ESPN+		Northern Colorado; Rescheduled from January 10	W 79–76	6–13 (4–7)	Viking Pavilion (989); Portland, OR
February 3, 2022; 5:00 pm, ESPN+		at Northern Colorado	W 106–99	7–13 (5–7)	Bank of Colorado Arena (888); Greeley, CO
February 5, 2022; 7:00 pm, ESPN+		Sacramento State	W 73–65	8–13 (6–7)	Viking Pavilion (1,096); Portland, OR
February 10, 2022; 6:00 pm, ESPN+		at Montana State	L 74–77	8–14 (6–8)	Brick Breeden Fieldhouse (3,556); Bozeman, MT
February 12, 2022; 6:00 pm, ESPN+		at Montana	L 76–85	8–15 (6–9)	Dahlberg Arena (3,223); Missoula, MT
February 17, 2022; 7:00 pm, ESPN+		Northern Arizona	W 68–67	9–15 (7–9)	Viking Pavilion (895); Portland, OR
February 24, 2022; 7:00 pm, ESPN+		Weber State	W 81–75	10–15 (8–9)	Viking Pavilion (1,077); Portland, OR
February 26, 2022; 7:00 pm, ESPN+		Idaho State	W 73–69 ^{OT}	11–15 (9–9)	Viking Pavilion (1,084); Portland, OR
March 3, 2022; 6:00 pm, ESPN+		at Idaho	W 79–68	12–15 (10–9)	Idaho Central Credit Union Arena (1,231); Moscow, ID
March 5, 2022; 2:00 pm, ESPN+		at Eastern Washington	L 75–83	12–16 (10–10)	Reese Court (1,621); Cheney, WA
Big Sky tournament
March 9, 2022; 12:00 pm, ESPN+	(7)	vs. (10) Idaho State; First round	W 66–52	13–16	Idaho Central Arena (1,498); Boise, ID
March 10, 2022; 5:30 pm, ESPN+	(7)	vs. (2) Southern Utah; Quarterfinals	W 77–65	14–16	Idaho Central Arena (2,096); Boise, ID
March 11, 2022; 8:00 pm, ESPN+	(7)	vs. (3) Northern Colorado; Semifinals	L 79–86	14–17	Idaho Central Arena (3,037); Boise, ID
*Non-conference game. ^{#}Rankings from AP Poll. (#) Tournament seedings in parentheses. All times are in Pacific.
