= 2021–22 Eastern Washington Eagles men's basketball team =

American college basketball season

2021–22 Eastern Washington Eagles men's basketball

The Basketball Classic, first round
- Conference: Big Sky Conference
- Record: 18–16 (11–9 Big Sky)
- Head coach: David Riley (1st season)
- Associate head coach: Arturo Ormond
- Assistant coaches: Mark Darnall; Roberto Bergersen
- Home arena: Reese Court

2021–22 Big Sky men's basketball standings
	Conf.				Overall
Team	W		L	PCT	W		L	PCT
Montana State †	16	–	4	.800	27	–	8	.771
Southern Utah	14	–	6	.700	23	–	12	.657
Northern Colorado	13	–	7	.650	22	–	16	.579
Weber State	13	–	7	.650	21	–	12	.636
Montana	11	–	9	.550	18	–	14	.563
Eastern Washington	11	–	9	.550	18	–	16	.529
Portland State	10	–	10	.500	14	–	17	.452
Sacramento State	6	–	14	.300	11	–	18	.379
Idaho	6	–	14	.300	9	–	22	.290
Idaho State	5	–	15	.250	7	–	23	.233
Northern Arizona	5	–	15	.250	9	–	23	.281
† Conference tournament winner

The 2021–22 Eastern Washington Eagles men's basketball team represented Eastern Washington University in the Big Sky Conference during the 2021–22 NCAA Division I men's basketball season. The Eagles, led by first-year head coach David Riley, played their home games on campus at Reese Court in Cheney, Washington.

== Previous season ==
The Eagles finished the 2020–21 season 13–7 overall (12–3, Big Sky, 2nd) and was seeded second in the conference tournament, which they won. Seeded fourteenth in the West regional of the NCAA tournament, they met twelfth-ranked Kansas in the round of 64. The Eagles scored the first nine points and led by eight at the half, but were overcome by the Jayhawks in the last ten minutes and lost by nine points; their season ended with an overall record of 16–8 (.667).

== Offseason ==
=== Departures ===
Name	Number	Pos.	Height	Weight	Year	Hometown	Reason for departure
Mutdung Bol	0	G	6'3"	145	Freshman	North Seattle, WA	Left the team for personal reasons
Jacob Davison	10	G	6'4"	175	RS Senior	Long Beach, CA	Graduate transferred to Cal Poly
Jack Perry	11	G	6'2"	175	Senior	Melbourne, Australia	Graduate transferred to Portland
Tyler Robertson	15	G/F	6'6"	200	Sophomore	Melbourne, Australia	Transferred to Portland
Kaelan O'Neil	22	G/F	6'5"	180	Freshman	Eugene, OR	Transferred to Lane CC
Jordan Venning	23	F	6'6"	205	RS Sophomore	Sumas, WA	Walk-on; transferred to Western Colorado
Kim Aiken Jr.	24	G/F	6'7"	215	RS Junior	Redlands, CA	Transferred to Arizona
Michael Meadows	25	G	6'2"	175	RS Sophomore	Hollywood, CA	Walk-on; left the team for personal reasons
Jacob Groves	33	G/F	6'7"	185	Sophomore	Spokane, WA	Transferred to Oklahoma
Tanner Groves	35	F	6'9"	235	RS Junior	Spokane, WA	Transferred to Oklahoma

=== Incoming transfers ===
Name	Number	Pos.	Height	Weight	Year	Hometown	Previous School
Sean Kirk	0	G	6'4"	180	RS Junior	Mountlake Terrace, WA	Western Washington
Rylan Bergersen	11	G	6'6"	205	Senior	Boise, ID	Central Arkansas
Angelo Allegri	13	F	6'7"	205	Junior	Kansas City, MO	UNC Greensboro
Linton Acliese III	20	F	6'6"	235	RS Senior	Richmond, CA	San Francisco State
Imhotep George	25	F	6'7"	195	Junior	Laurel, MD	Tallahassee CC

=== 2021 incoming recruits ===
College recruiting
Name	Hometown	School	Height	Weight	Commit date
Tommaso Camponeschi; PG	Italy	Associazione Sportiva Stella Azzura	6 ft 2 in (1.88 m)	166 lb (75 kg)	Aug 3, 2021
Tommaso Camponeschi; PG	Recruit ratings: No ratings found				
Mason Landdeck; PG	Zillah, WA	Desert Hills High School	6 ft 2 in (1.88 m)	160 lb (73 kg)	Jun 17, 2021
Mason Landdeck; PG	Recruit ratings: No ratings found				
Isaiah Amato; PG	Portland, OR	Central Catholic High School	6 ft 5 in (1.96 m)	175 lb (79 kg)	Feb 3, 2018
Isaiah Amato; PG	Recruit ratings: No ratings found				
Casey Jones; SF	Sammamish, WA	Wasatch Academy	6 ft 6 in (1.98 m)	210 lb (95 kg)	Aug 2, 2019
Casey Jones; SF	Recruit ratings: No ratings found				
Yousef Elkugia; SF	Sammamish, WA	Elite Sports Academy	6 ft 7 in (2.01 m)	210 lb (95 kg)	Jun 21, 2021
Yousef Elkugia; SF	Recruit ratings: No ratings found				
Ethan Price; SF	Bury St Edmunds, UK	Ipswich Basketball Academy	6 ft 10 in (2.08 m)	230 lb (100 kg)	Oct 16, 2020
Ethan Price; SF	Recruit ratings: No ratings found				
Victor Radocaj; SF	Richmond, Canada	RISE Prep at TRC Academy	6 ft 9 in (2.06 m)	195 lb (88 kg)	Sep 10, 2018
Victor Radocaj; SF	Recruit ratings: No ratings found				
Michael Folarin; C	London, United Kingdom	Bella Vista College Prep School	6 ft 11 in (2.11 m)	210 lb (95 kg)	Jun 15, 2021
Michael Folarin; C	Recruit ratings: No ratings found				
Makai Richards; C	Oak Park, CA	New Hampton School	6 ft 10 in (2.08 m)	225 lb (102 kg)	Jun 15, 2021
Makai Richards; C	Recruit ratings: No ratings found				
Overall recruit ranking:
Note: In many cases, Scout, Rivals, 247Sports, On3, and ESPN may conflict in their listings of height and weight.; In these cases, the average was taken. ESPN grades are on a 100-point scale.; Sources: "2021 Team Ranking". Rivals.

== Roster ==
2021–22 Eastern Washington Eagles men's basketball team
Players
Coaches

Pos.	#	Name	Height	Weight	Year	Previous school	Hometown
G	0	Sean Kirk	6 ft 3 in (1.91 m)	185 lb (84 kg)	RS Jr	Mountlake Terrace High School; Western Washington	Mountlake Terrace, Washington
G	1	Austin Fadal	6 ft 4 in (1.93 m)	175 lb (79 kg)	RS So	Hillcrest Prep	San Ramon, California
G/F	2	Steele Venters	6 ft 7 in (2.01 m)	175 lb (79 kg)	RS Fr	Ellensburg High School	Ellensburg, Washington
G	4	Isaiah Amato	6 ft 5 in (1.96 m)	175 lb (79 kg)	Fr	Central Catholic High School	Portland, Oregon
G	5	Casson Rouse (W)	6 ft 2 in (1.88 m)	180 lb (82 kg)	RS So	Timberline High School	Lacey, Washington
F	10	Ethan Price	6 ft 10 in (2.08 m)	230 lb (104 kg)	Fr	Copleston High School	Bury St Edmunds, England
G	11	Rylan Bergersen	6 ft 6 in (1.98 m)	215 lb (98 kg)	Sr	Borah High School; Central Arkansas	Boise, Idaho
F	13	Angelo Allegri	6 ft 7 in (2.01 m)	215 lb (98 kg)	Sr	Saint Thomas Aquinas High School; UNC Greensboro	Kansas City, Missouri
F	15	Yousef Elkugia	6 ft 7 in (2.01 m)	210 lb (95 kg)	Fr	Elite Prep	Seattle, Washington
F	20	Linton Aclinese	6 ft 6 in (1.98 m)	235 lb (107 kg)	RS Sr	Manvel High School; San Francisco State	Richmond, California
F	21	Victor Radocaj	6 ft 9 in (2.06 m)	195 lb (88 kg)	Fr	RISE Centre Academy	Richmond, British Columbia
C	23	Michael Folarin	6 ft 11 in (2.11 m)	210 lb (95 kg)	Fr	Bella Vista College Prep (AZ)	London, England
G	24	Mason Landdeck	6 ft 2 in (1.88 m)	160 lb (73 kg)	Fr	Desert Hills High School	Zillah, Washington
F	25	Imhotep George	6 ft 8 in (2.03 m)	195 lb (88 kg)	So	Meade High School; Tallahassee CC	Laurel, Maryland
F	31	Casey Jones	6 ft 6 in (1.98 m)	210 lb (95 kg)	Fr	Wasatch Academy	Sammamish, Washington
G	32	Tommaso Camponeschi	6 ft 2 in (1.88 m)	166 lb (75 kg)	Fr	Cretin-Derham Hall High School	Rome, Italy
F	34	Makai Richards	6 ft 10 in (2.08 m)	225 lb (102 kg)	Fr	Oak Park High School	Oak Park, California
G	55	Ellis Magnuson	6 ft 2 in (1.88 m)	190 lb (86 kg)	So	Borah High School	Boise, Idaho

Head coach

- David Riley (Whitworth)

Assistant coach(es)

- Arturo Ormond (Texas–Pan American)
- Mark Darnall (Eureka)
- Roberto Bergersen (Boise State)

Legend

- (C) Team captain
- (S) Suspended
- (I) Ineligible
- (W) Walk-on
- Injured
- Current redshirt

Roster

== Schedule and results ==
Date time, TV	Rank^{#}	Opponent^{#}	Result	Record	Site (attendance) city, state
Regular season
November 9, 2021*; 7:00 p.m.		at Nevada	L 76–91	0–1	Lawlor Events Center (7,103); Reno, NV
November 12, 2021*; 2:00 p.m., ESPN+		at UC Davis	L 76–84	0–2	University Credit Union Center (950); Davis, CA
November 15, 2021*; 6:00 p.m., ESPN+		Walla Walla	W 111–71	1–2	Reese Court (1,020); Cheney, WA
November 19, 2021*; 2:00 p.m., ESPN+		at Cal State Northridge; Good Sam Empire Classic semifinals	W 67–64 ^{OT}	2–2	Matadome (483); Northridge, CA
November 20, 2021*; 8:00 p.m.		vs. Texas State; Good Sam Empire Classic championship	L 74–81	2–3	Matadome (124); Northridge, CA
November 27, 2021*; 4:30 p.m., P12N		at Washington State	W 76–71	3–3	Beasley Coliseum (2,720); Pullman, WA
December 2, 2021; 6:00 p.m., ESPN+		Southern Utah	L 76–89	3–4 (0–1)	Reese Court (1,344); Cheney, WA
December 4, 2021*; 10:00 a.m., ESPN+		at Omaha	W 92–81	4–4	Baxter Arena (1,111); Omaha, NE
December 8, 2021*; 5:00 p.m., P12N		at Colorado	L 57–60	4–5	CU Events Center (5,782); Boulder, CO
December 11, 2021*; 11:00 a.m., ESPN+		at North Dakota	W 76–60	5–5	Betty Engelstad Sioux Center (1,280); Grand Forks, ND
December 15, 2021*; 6:00 p.m., ESPN+		Multnomah	W 95–56	6–5	Reese Court (850); Cheney, WA
December 22, 2021*; 11:00 a.m., ESPN+		at No. 25 Texas Tech	L 46–78	6–6	United Supermarkets Arena (12,133); Lubbock, TX
December 30, 2021; 7:00 p.m., ESPN+		at Portland State	W 63–58	7–6 (1–1)	Viking Pavilion (717); Portland, OR
January 1, 2022; 1:00 p.m., ESPN+		at Northern Arizona	W 78–65	8–6 (2–1)	Walkup Skydome (161); Flagstaff, AZ
January 6, 2022; 6:00 p.m., ESPN+		Montana	L 78–90	8–7 (2–2)	Reese Court (1,140); Cheney, WA
January 8, 2022; 3:30 p.m., ESPN+		Idaho	W 96–93	9–7 (3–2)	Reese Court (1,351); Cheney, WA
January 20, 2022; 6:00 p.m., ESPN+		Sacramento State	W 75–62	10–7 (4–2)	Reese Court (1,075); Cheney, WA
January 22, 2022; 2:00 p.m., ESPN+		Northern Colorado	L 83–87	10–8 (4–3)	Reese Court (1,102); Cheney, WA
January 24, 2022; 6:00 p.m., ESPN+		at Idaho State; Rescheduled from January 13	W 89–63	11–8 (5–3)	Reed Gym (1,042); Pocatello, ID
January 27, 2022; 6:00 p.m., ESPN+		at Montana State	L 65–69	11–9 (5–4)	Brick Breeden Fieldhouse (3,078); Bozeman, MT
January 29, 2022; 6:00 p.m., ESPN+		at Montana	L 59–61	11–10 (5–5)	Dahlberg Arena (3,882); Missoula, MT
January 31, 2022; 6:00 p.m., ESPN+		at Weber State; Rescheduled from January 15	L 84–90	11–11 (5–6)	Dee Events Center (3,462); Ogden, UT
February 5, 2022; 6:00 p.m., ESPN+		at Southern Utah	L 72–84	11–12 (5–7)	America First Event Center (1,876); Cedar City, UT
February 10, 2022; 6:00 p.m., ESPN+		Weber State	W 75–67	12–12 (6–7)	Reese Court (1,155); Cheney, WA
February 12, 2022; 3:30 p.m., ESPN+		Idaho State	W 75–72	13–12 (7–7)	Reese Court (1,336); Cheney, WA
February 17, 2022; 6:00 p.m., ESPN+		Montana State	W 88–86 ^{OT}	14–12 (8–7)	Reese Court (1,216); Cheney, WA
February 19, 2022; 2:00 p.m., ESPN+		at Idaho	L 80–83	14–13 (8–8)	ICCU Arena (2,230); Moscow, ID
February 24, 2022; 5:00 p.m., ESPN+		at Northern Colorado	W 85–76	15–13 (9–8)	Bank of Colorado Arena (1,004); Greeley, CO
February 26, 2022; 7:00 p.m., ESPN+		at Sacramento State	L 75–81	15–14 (9–9)	Hornets Nest (741); Sacramento, CA
March 3, 2022; 6:00 p.m., ESPN+		Northern Arizona	W 69–62	16–14 (10–9)	Reese Court (1,182); Cheney, WA
March 5, 2022; 1:00 p.m., ESPN+		Portland State	W 83–75	17–14 (11–9)	Reese Court (1,621); Cheney, WA
Big Sky tournament
March 9, 2022; 2:30 p.m., ESPN+	(6)	vs. (11) Northern Arizona; First round	W 78–75	18–14	Idaho Central Arena (1,175); Boise, ID
March 10, 2022; 8:00 p.m., ESPN+	(6)	vs. (3) Northern Colorado; Quarterfinal	L 67–68	18–15	Idaho Central Arena (2,022); Boise, ID
The Basketball Classic
March 17, 2022; 7:00 p.m., ESPN+		at Fresno State; First Round	L 74–83	18–16	Save Mart Center; Fresno, CA
*Non-conference game. ^{#}Rankings from AP poll. (#) Tournament seedings in parentheses. W=West. All times are in Pacific time.
