= 2021–22 Southern Utah Thunderbirds men's basketball team =

American college basketball season

2021–22 Southern Utah Thunderbirds men's basketball

Fort Myers Tip-Off Palms Division champions

The Basketball Classic, Semifinals
- Conference: Big Sky Conference
- Record: 23–12 (14–6 Big Sky)
- Head coach: Todd Simon (6th season)
- Assistant coaches: Flynn Clayman; Bryce Martin; Aerick Sanders
- Home arena: America First Event Center

2021–22 Big Sky men's basketball standings
	Conf.				Overall
Team	W		L	PCT	W		L	PCT
Montana State †	16	–	4	.800	27	–	8	.771
Southern Utah	14	–	6	.700	23	–	12	.657
Northern Colorado	13	–	7	.650	22	–	16	.579
Weber State	13	–	7	.650	21	–	12	.636
Montana	11	–	9	.550	18	–	14	.563
Eastern Washington	11	–	9	.550	18	–	16	.529
Portland State	10	–	10	.500	14	–	17	.452
Sacramento State	6	–	14	.300	11	–	18	.379
Idaho	6	–	14	.300	9	–	22	.290
Idaho State	5	–	15	.250	7	–	23	.233
Northern Arizona	5	–	15	.250	9	–	23	.281
† Conference tournament winner

The 2021–22 Southern Utah Thunderbirds men's basketball team represented Southern Utah University in the 2021–22 NCAA Division I men's basketball season. The Thunderbirds, led by sixth-year head coach Todd Simon, played their home games at the America First Event Center in Cedar City, Utah as members of the Big Sky Conference. They finished the season 23–12, 14–6 in Big Sky play to finish in second place. They lost in the quarterfinals of the Big Sky tournament to Portland State. They received an invitation to The Basketball Classic tournament where they defeated Kent State, UTEP, and Portland to advance to the tournament semifinals. There they lost to Fresno State.

The season was the program's last as members of the Big Sky with the school announcing that the Thunderbirds will join the Western Athletic Conference in 2022.

== Previous season ==
In a season limited due to the ongoing COVID-19 pandemic, the Thunderbirds finished the 2020–21 season 20–4, 12–2 in Big Sky play to finish as Big Sky regular season champions. They defeated Northern Colorado in the quarterfinals of the Big Sky tournament, before being upset in overtime in the semifinals by Montana State.

== Roster ==
2021–22 Southern Utah Thunderbirds men's basketball team
Players
Coaches

Pos.	#	Name	Height	Weight	Year	Previous school	Hometown
G	0	Amound Anderson	6 ft 3 in (1.91 m)	187 lb (85 kg)	So	Cal State Northridge	Los Angeles, CA
G	1	Nick Fleming	6 ft 1 in (1.85 m)	145 lb (66 kg)	Sr	Highland CC	Atlanta, GA
G	2	Aanen Moody	6 ft 3 in (1.91 m)	177 lb (80 kg)	RS Sr	North Dakota	Dickinson, ND
G	3	John Knight III	6 ft 3 in (1.91 m)	203 lb (92 kg)	RS Sr	Utah State	Jackson, MS
G	4	Dre Marin	6 ft 0 in (1.83 m)	177 lb (80 kg)	RS Sr	Apollo HS	Glendale, AZ
G	5	Tevian Jones	6 ft 7 in (2.01 m)	197 lb (89 kg)	Sr	Illinois	Chandler, AZ
F	10	Anthony Swift	6 ft 6 in (1.98 m)	215 lb (98 kg)	Fr	Desert Pines HS	Las Vegas, NV
F	12	Maizen Fausett	6 ft 6 in (1.98 m)	225 lb (102 kg)	Sr	Westlake HS	Saratoga Springs, UT
G	13	Dee Barnes	6 ft 4 in (1.93 m)	193 lb (88 kg)	Sr	Mount St. Mary's	Great Mills, MD
C	14	Jason Spurgin	6 ft 11 in (2.11 m)	235 lb (107 kg)	So	Toowoomba Grammar School	Toowoomba, Australia
G	15	Harrison Butler	6 ft 5 in (1.96 m)	222 lb (101 kg)	Sr	Mater Dei HS	Santa Ana, CA
G	21	Josh Valentine	6 ft 0 in (1.83 m)	174 lb (79 kg)	Fr	Foothill HS	Pleasanton, CA
G	23	Andrew Marshall	6 ft 4 in (1.93 m)	204 lb (93 kg)	Fr	Coronado HS	Las Vegas, NV
G/F	24	Marquis Moore	6 ft 6 in (1.98 m)	212 lb (96 kg)	Sr	Detroit Mercy	Los Angeles, CA
F	25	Malik Muhammad	6 ft 9 in (2.06 m)	230 lb (104 kg)	Jr	Central Michigan	Harbor City, CA
G	33	Martel Williams	6 ft 3 in (1.91 m)	213 lb (97 kg)	So	Middlebrooks Academy	Las Vegas, NV
C		Parsa Fallah	6 ft 9 in (2.06 m)	—	Fr	Iranian National Team	Iran

Head coach

- Todd Simon (UNLV)

Assistant coach(es)

- Flynn Clayman (Troy)
- Bryce Martin (Boise State)
- Aerick Sanders (San Diego State)

Legend

- (C) Team captain
- (S) Suspended
- (I) Ineligible
- (W) Walk-on
- Injured
- Current redshirt

Roster
Last update: November 15, 2021

== Schedule and results ==
Date time, TV	Rank^{#}	Opponent^{#}	Result	Record	Site (attendance) city, state
Regular season
November 9, 2021*; 7:00 pm, ESPN+		Bethesda	W 116–74	1–0	America First Event Center (1,300); Cedar City, UT
November 12, 2021*; 7:00 pm, ESPN+		at Dixie State	L 76–83	1–1	Burns Arena (4,105); St. George, UT
November 15, 2021*; 8:00 pm		at Saint Mary's	L 51–70	1–2	University Credit Union Pavilion (2,031); Moraga, CA
November 18, 2021*; 8:00 pm, P12N		at California; Fort Myers Tip-Off campus game	L 68–75 ^{2OT}	1–3	Haas Pavilion (3,977); Berkeley, CA
November 23, 2021*; 12:00 pm, ESPN+		vs. Yale; Fort Myers Tip-Off Palms Semifinals	W 88–85 ^{OT}	2–3	Suncoast Credit Union Arena (573); Fort Myers, FL
November 24, 2021*; 1:30 pm		vs. Bowling Green; Fort Myers Tip-Off Palms Championship Game	W 87–73	3–3	Suncoast Credit Union Arena (388); Fort Myers, FL
December 2, 2021; 7:00 pm, ESPN+		at Eastern Washington	W 89–76	4–3 (1–0)	Reese Court (1,344); Cheney, WA
December 4, 2021; 3:00 pm, ESPN+		at Idaho	W 81–75	5–3 (2–0)	Idaho Central Credit Union Arena (1,043); Moscow, ID
December 8, 2021*; 7:00 pm, ESPN+		Utah Valley	W 60–56	6–3	America First Event Center (2,053); Cedar City, UT
December 11, 2021*; 1:00 pm, ESPN+		Saint Katherine	W 100–61	7–3	America First Event Center (977); Cedar City, UT
December 18, 2021*; 5:00 pm, BTN		at Michigan	L 50–87	7–4	Crisler Center (12,445); Ann Arbor, MI
December 22, 2021*; 7:00 pm, ESPN+		Dixie State	W 87–59	8–4	America First Event Center (2,638); Cedar City, UT
December 30, 2021; 7:00 pm, ESPN+		Sacramento State	W 64–51	9–4 (3–0)	America First Event Center (1,261); Cedar City, UT
January 1, 2022; 7:00 pm, ESPN+		Northern Colorado	L 81–91	9–5 (3–1)	America First Event Center (865); Cedar City, UT
January 17, 2022; 7:00 pm, ESPN+		Portland State; Rescheduled from January 6	W 86–76	10–5 (4–1)	America First Event Center (1,811); Cedar City, UT
January 22, 2022; 2:00 pm, ESPN+		Idaho State	W 86–74	11–5 (5–1)	America First Event Center (1,033); Cedar City, UT
January 24, 2022; 7:00 pm, ESPN+		Weber State	L 84–92	11–6 (5–2)	America First Event Center (3,133); Cedar City, UT
January 27, 2022; 8:00 pm, ESPN+		at Portland State	W 85–82 ^{OT}	12–6 (6–2)	Viking Pavilion (784); Portland, OR
January 31, 2022; 5:00 pm, ESPN+		Northern Arizona; Rescheduled from January 8	W 78–66	13–6 (7–2)	America First Event Center (1,239); Cedar City, UT
February 3, 2022; 7:00 pm, ESPN+		Idaho	W 75–59	14–6 (8–2)	America First Event Center (2,033); Cedar City, UT
February 5, 2022; 7:00 pm, ESPN+		Eastern Washington	W 84–72	15–6 (9–2)	America First Event Center (1,876); Cedar City, UT
February 7, 2022; 7:00 pm, ESPN+		at Montana; Rescheduled from January 13	L 67–78	15–7 (9–3)	Dahlberg Arena (2,947); Missoula, MT
February 12, 2022; 2:00 pm, ESPN+		at Sacramento State	W 83–57	16–7 (10–3)	Hornets Nest (503); Sacramento, CA
February 14, 2022; 6:00 pm, ESPN+		at Northern Colorado	L 95–100	16–8 (10–4)	Bank of Colorado Arena (1,024); Greeley, CO
February 19, 2022; 2:00 pm, ESPN+		Montana State	L 71–76	16–9 (10–5)	America First Event Center (1,360); Cedar City, UT
February 21, 2022; 6:00 pm, ESPN+		at Northern Arizona	W 79–48	17–9 (11–5)	Walkup Skydome (903); Flagstaff, AZ
February 24, 2022; 7:00 pm, ESPN+		Montana	W 82–74	18–9 (12–5)	America First Event Center (1,817); Cedar City, UT
March 1, 2022; 4:00 pm, ESPN+		at Montana State; Rescheduled from January 15	L 53–69	18–10 (12–6)	Brick Breeden Fieldhouse (3,288); Bozeman, MT
March 3, 2022; 7:00 pm, ESPN+		at Idaho State	W 79–71	19–10 (13–6)	Reed Gym (1,334); Pocatello, ID
March 5, 2022; 6:00 pm, ESPN+		at Weber State	W 80–70	20–10 (14–6)	Dee Events Center (6,166); Ogden, UT
Big Sky tournament
March 10, 2022; 5:30 pm, ESPN+	(2)	vs. (7) Portland State; Quarterfinals	L 65–77	20–11	Idaho Central Arena (2,096); Boise, ID
The Basketball Classic
March 16, 2022; 7:00 pm, ESPN+		Kent State; First Round	W 83–79	21–11	America First Event Center; Cedar City, UT
March 22, 20222; 7:00 pm, ESPN+		at UTEP; Second Round	W 82–69	22–11	Don Haskins Center; El Paso, TX
March 26, 2022; 4:00 pm, ESPN+		Portland; Quarterfinals	W 77–66	23–11	America First Event Center (1,504); Cedar City, UT
March 28, 2022; 8:00 pm, ESPN+		at Fresno State; Semifinals	L 48–67	23–12	Save Mart Center; Fresno, CA
*Non-conference game. ^{#}Rankings from AP Poll. (#) Tournament seedings in parentheses. All times are in Mountain.
