= 2022 Big Sky Conference men's basketball tournament =

Postseason tournament for the Big Sky

- Classification: Division I
- Season: 2021–22
- Teams: 11
- Site: Idaho Central Arena; Boise, Idaho
- Champions: Montana State (3rd title)
- Winning coach: Danny Sprinkle (1st title)
- Television: ESPN+, ESPNU (final)

2021–22 Big Sky men's basketball standings
	Conf.				Overall
Team	W		L	PCT	W		L	PCT
Montana State †	16	–	4	.800	27	–	8	.771
Southern Utah	14	–	6	.700	23	–	12	.657
Northern Colorado	13	–	7	.650	22	–	16	.579
Weber State	13	–	7	.650	21	–	12	.636
Montana	11	–	9	.550	18	–	14	.563
Eastern Washington	11	–	9	.550	18	–	16	.529
Portland State	10	–	10	.500	14	–	17	.452
Sacramento State	6	–	14	.300	11	–	18	.379
Idaho	6	–	14	.300	9	–	22	.290
Idaho State	5	–	15	.250	7	–	23	.233
Northern Arizona	5	–	15	.250	9	–	23	.281
† Conference tournament winner

The 2022 Big Sky Conference men's basketball tournament was the postseason tournament for the Big Sky Conference, held March 9–12 at Idaho Central Arena in Boise, Idaho. It was the 47th edition of the conference tourney, which debuted in 1976.

Top-seeded Montana State defeated third seed Northern Colorado 87–66 in the final and received the conference's automatic bid to the NCAA tournament. It was the Bobcats' first NCAA appearance in 26 years and their fourth overall.

Second seed Southern Utah lost its opener in their final Big Sky tournament; they joined the Western Athletic Conference (WAC) in the summer.

== Seeds ==
The eleven teams were seeded by conference record, with a tiebreaker system; the top five teams received a first-round bye.

Seed	School	Record	Tiebreaker 1	Tiebreaker 2	Tiebreaker 3	Tiebreaker 4
1	Montana State	16–4				
2	Southern Utah	14–6				
3	Northern Colorado	13–7	1–1 vs Weber State	1–1 vs Montana State	2–0 vs Southern Utah	
4	Weber State	13–7	1–1 vs Northern Colorado	1–1 vs Montana State	1–1 vs Southern Utah	
5	Montana	11–9	2–0 vs Eastern Washington			
6	Eastern Washington	11–9	0–2 vs Montana			
7	Portland State	10–10				
8	Sacramento State	6–14	1–1 vs Idaho	0–2 vs Montana State	0–2 vs Southern Utah	1–1 vs Northern Colorado
9	Idaho	6–14	1–1 vs Sacramento State	0–2 vs Montana State	0–2 vs Southern Utah	0–2 vs Northern Colorado
10	Idaho State	5–15	1–1 vs Northern Arizona	0–2 vs Montana State	0–2 vs Southern Utah	1–1 vs Northern Colorado
11	Northern Arizona	5–15	1–1 vs Idaho State	0–2 vs Montana State	0–2 vs Southern Utah	0–2 vs Northern Colorado

== Schedule ==
Session	Game	Time	Matchup	Score	Television	Attendance
First round – Wednesday, March 9
1	1	9:30 am	No. 8 Sacramento State vs. No. 9 Idaho	57–54	ESPN+	1,403
1	2	12:00 pm	No. 7 Portland State vs. No. 10 Idaho State	66–52	ESPN+	1,498
1	3	2:30 pm	No. 6 Eastern Washington vs. No. 11 Northern Arizona	78–75	ESPN+	1,175
Quarterfinals – Thursday, March 10
2	4	12:00 pm	No. 1 Montana State vs. No. 8 Sacramento State	83-61	ESPN+	1,334
2	5	2:30 pm	No. 4 Weber State vs. No. 5 Montana	68-56	ESPN+	1,334
3	6	5:30 pm	No. 2 Southern Utah vs. No. 7 Portland State	65-77	ESPN+	2,096
3	7	8:00 pm	No. 3 Northern Colorado vs. No. 6 Eastern Washington	68–67	ESPN+	2,096
Semifinals – Friday, March 11
4	8	5:30 pm	No. 1 Montana State vs. No. 4 Weber State	69–66	ESPN+	2,535
4	9	8:00 pm	No. 7 Portland State vs. No. 3 Northern Colorado	79–86	ESPN+	3,037
Championship game – Saturday, March 12
5	10	6:00 pm	No. 1 Montana State vs. No. 3 Northern Colorado	87–66	ESPNU	4,134

== Bracket ==
First round Wednesday, March 9
8	Sacramento State	57
9	Idaho	54
7	Portland State	66
10	Idaho State	52
6	Eastern Washington	78
11	Northern Arizona	75

Quarterfinals; Thursday, March 10
1	Montana State	83
8	Sacramento State	61
4	Weber State	68
5	Montana	56
2	Southern Utah	65
7	Portland State	77
3	Northern Colorado	68
6	Eastern Washington	67

Semifinals; Friday, March 11
1	Montana State	69
4	Weber State	66
7	Portland State	79
3	Northern Colorado	86

Championship; Saturday, March 12
1	Montana State	87
3	Northern Colorado	66
