= Yellowstone Christian College =

Coordinates: 45.74216°N 108.61684°W

Yellowstone Christian College (alternately known as Montana Christian College) is a four-year, confessional Christian liberal arts college with one campus in Kalispell, Montana. The college is affiliated with the Montana Southern Baptist Convention. Founded in 1974, it was called Yellowstone Baptist College until 2010. It was previously in Yellowstone County, adjacent to Billings. The college sold its former Billings area campus in 2021, and relocating to Kalispell in the same year.

== Overview ==
YCC (MCC) is a member of the Association for Biblical Higher Education (ABHE, Orlando). YCC is authorized by the Montana University System (MUS) and the US Department of Education (DOE). YCC is recognized by the Council on Higher Education Accreditation (CHEA).

YCC offers Associate of Arts degrees in Christian Leadership, Associate of Science degrees in Business and Exercise Science, Bachelor of Arts in Christian Leadership, and Bachelor of Science degrees in Sports Management and Business.

Collegiate basketball began in 2015 with the men's team and 2016 with the women's teams. These programs ended in late 2021.

YCC offers student housing and meal plans. The Ida Dockery Owen Library contains 20,000+ volumes and is housed in an 8,000-square-foot building. The William S. and Laura Jean Phillips Auditorium seats 220, housing classrooms and the dining hall.
