= 2019–20 Weber State Wildcats men's basketball team =

American college basketball season

2019–20 Weber State Wildcats men's basketball
- Conference: Big Sky Conference
- Record: 12–20 (8–12 Big Sky)
- Head coach: Randy Rahe (14th season)
- Associate head coach: Eric Duft
- Assistant coaches: David Marek; Eric Daniels
- Home arena: Dee Events Center

2019–20 Big Sky men's basketball standings
	Conf.				Overall
Team	W		L	PCT	W		L	PCT
Eastern Washington	16	–	4	.800	23	–	8	.742
Northern Colorado	15	–	5	.750	22	–	9	.710
Montana	14	–	6	.700	18	–	13	.581
Portland State	12	–	8	.600	18	–	14	.563
Northern Arizona	10	–	10	.500	16	–	14	.533
Montana State	10	–	10	.500	16	–	15	.516
Southern Utah	9	–	11	.450	17	–	15	.531
Sacramento State	8	–	12	.400	16	–	14	.533
Weber State	8	–	12	.400	12	–	20	.375
Idaho State	4	–	16	.200	8	–	22	.267
Idaho	4	–	16	.200	8	–	24	.250
Note: The conference tournament was canceled prior to the quarterfinals due to the COVID-19 pandemic.

The 2019–20 Weber State Wildcats men's basketball team represented Weber State University in the 2019–20 NCAA Division I men's basketball season. The Wildcats, led by 14th-year head coach Randy Rahe, played their home games at the Dee Events Center in Ogden, Utah, as members of the Big Sky Conference. They finished the season 12–20, 8–12 in Big Sky play, to finish in a tie for eighth place. As the No. 9 seed in the Big Sky tournament, they lost in the first round to Sacramento State.

== Previous season ==
The Wildcats finished the 2018–19 season 18–15, 11–9 in Big Sky play, to finish in a three-way tie for fourth place. In the Big Sky tournament, they defeated Portland State in the quarterfinals, before falling to top-seeded Montana in the semifinals.

== Roster ==
2019–20 Weber State Wildcats men's basketball team
Players
Coaches

Pos.	#	Name	Height	Weight	Year	Previous school	Hometown
G	2	Austin Galuppo	6 ft 5 in (1.96 m)	165 lb (75 kg)	Fr	West Ranch; Scotland Campus Prep	Los Angeles, California
G	3	KJ Cunningham	6 ft 2 in (1.88 m)	190 lb (86 kg)	Fr	Rudder	Bryan, Texas
G	4	Kham Davis	6 ft 4 in (1.93 m)	200 lb (91 kg)	Jr	Forrest Trail Academy; Pittsburgh	Denver, Colorado
G	5	Cody John	6 ft 3 in (1.91 m)	185 lb (84 kg)	Sr	Wasatch Academy	Mississauga, Canada
G	10	Jerrick Harding	6 ft 1 in (1.85 m)	180 lb (82 kg)	Sr	Wichita Southeast	Wichita, Kansas
F	11	Michal Kozak	6 ft 8 in (2.03 m)	215 lb (98 kg)	Jr	Get Better Academy	Plzeň, Czech Republic
G	12	Israel Barnes	6 ft 4 in (1.93 m)	185 lb (84 kg)	So	Wichita Southeast	Wichita, Kansas
F	13	Donatas Kupsas	6 ft 8 in (2.03 m)	210 lb (95 kg)	So	Long Island Lutheran	Joniškis, Lithuania
F	14	Boubacar Diakite	6 ft 7 in (2.01 m)	185 lb (84 kg)	So	Iowa Western CC; St. John's	Bamako, Mali
G	20	Sano Gasana	6 ft 4 in (1.93 m)	155 lb (70 kg)	So	College of Southern Idaho; Layton Christian	Kigali, Rwanda
G	23	Judah Jordan	6 ft 2 in (1.88 m)	185 lb (84 kg)	Fr	Capital Christian Academy; Scotland Campus Prep	Baltimore, Maryland
F/C	24	Dima Zdor	6 ft 10 in (2.08 m)	215 lb (98 kg)	So	Saint James School	Yalta, Ukraine
F/C	33	Tim Fuller	6 ft 9 in (2.06 m)	235 lb (107 kg)	RS Fr	Highland	Gilbert, Arizona
F	34	Brenden Morris	6 ft 7 in (2.01 m)	200 lb (91 kg)	Sr	Ben Lomond	Ogden, Utah
F/C	50	Mitch Brizee	6 ft 9 in (2.06 m)	220 lb (100 kg)	Fr	Twin Falls	Twin Falls, Idaho

Head coach

- Randy Rahe (Buena Vista)

Assistant coach(es)

- Eric Duft (Sterling (KS))
- David Marek (Southern Utah)
- Eric Daniels (Johnson & Wales)

Legend

- (C) Team captain
- (S) Suspended
- (I) Ineligible
- (W) Walk-on
- Injured
- Current redshirt

Roster
Last update: January 12, 2020

== Schedule and results ==
Date time, TV	Rank^{#}	Opponent^{#}	Result	Record	Site (attendance) city, state
Exhibition
November 2, 2019*; 2:00 pm		Western Colorado	W 94–56		Dee Events Center; Ogden, UT
Non-conference regular season
November 8, 2019*; 7:00 pm		at No. 17 Utah State	L 34–89	0–1	Smith Spectrum (8,840); Logan, UT
November 14, 2019*; 7:00 pm, Pluto TV		San Diego	L 56–71	0–2	Dee Events Center (5,586); Ogden, UT
November 19, 2019*; 7:00 pm, Pluto TV		West Coast Baptist	W 130–50	1–2	Dee Events Center (2,750); Ogden, UT
November 25, 2019*; 3:00 pm		vs. Wright State; Gulf Coast Showcase First Round	L 57–72	1–3	Hertz Arena (893); Estero, FL
November 26, 2019*; 11:30 am		vs. Murray State; Gulf Coast Showcase Consolation 2nd Round	L 68–69	1–4	Hertz Arena (786); Estero, FL
November 27, 2019*; 9:00 am		vs. Northeastern; Gulf Coast Showcase 7th-place game	L 69–79	1–5	Hertz Arena (317); Estero, FL
December 4, 2019*; 7:00 pm		at Utah Valley	W 72–67	2–5	UCCU Center (2,063); Orem, UT
December 7, 2019*; 7:00 pm, Pluto TV		Westcliff	W 86–46	3–5	Dee Events Center (2,322); Ogden, UT
December 14, 2019*; 2:00 pm, P12N		vs. Utah; Old Oquirrh Bucket/Beehive Classic	L 49–60	3–6	Vivint Smart Home Arena; Salt Lake City, UT
December 17, 2019*; 7:30 pm, Pluto TV		Bethesda	W 109–62	4–6	Dee Events Center (2,277); Ogden, UT
December 21, 2019*; 7:00 pm, BYUtv		at BYU; Old Oquirrh Bucket	L 61–91	4–7	Marriott Center (11,662); Provo, UT
Big Sky regular season
December 28, 2019; 2:00 pm, Pluto TV		Eastern Washington	L 77–79	4–8 (0–1)	Dee Events Center (4,423); Ogden, UT
December 30, 2019; 7:00 pm, Pluto TV		Idaho	W 69–68	5–8 (1–1)	Dee Events Center (4,222); Ogden, UT
January 4, 2020; 4:00 pm, Pluto TV		at Northern Arizona	L 64–72	5–9 (1–2)	Walkup Skydome (263); Flagstaff, AZ
January 9, 2020; 7:00 pm, Eleven/Pluto TV		Northern Colorado	L 64–65	5–10 (1–3)	Dee Events Center (4,022); Ogden, UT
January 11, 2020; 8:00 pm, Pluto TV		at Sacramento State	L 57–71	5–11 (1–4)	Hornets Nest (601); Sacramento, CA
January 16, 2020; 7:00 pm, Pluto TV		at Idaho State	W 76–68 ^{OT}	6–11 (2–4)	Reed Gym (1,745); Pocatello, ID
January 20, 2020; 8:00 pm, Pluto TV		at Portland State	L 76–92	6–12 (2–5)	Viking Pavilion (875); Portland, OR
January 23, 2020; 7:00 pm, Pluto TV		Montana State	L 61–62	6–13 (2–6)	Dee Events Center (5,223); Ogden, UT
January 25, 2020; 7:00 pm, KJZZ/Pluto TV		Montana	W 87–85 ^{OT}	7–13 (3–6)	Dee Events Center (6,034); Ogden, UT
January 30, 2020; 7:00 pm, Pluto TV		at Southern Utah	W 75–65	8–13 (4–6)	America First Event Center (4,021); Cedar City, UT
February 1, 2020; 7:00 pm, Pluto TV		at Northern Colorado	L 52–70	8–14 (4–7)	Bank of Colorado Arena (1,776); Greeley, CO
February 6, 2020; 7:00 pm, Eleven/Pluto TV		Sacramento State	W 70–66	9–14 (5–7)	Dee Events Center (4,022); Ogden, UT
February 8, 2020; 7:00 pm, Pluto TV		Northern Arizona	W 76–70	10–14 (6–7)	Dee Events Center (5,133); Ogden, UT
February 13, 2020; 7:00 pm, Pluto TV		at Montana	L 37–72	10–15 (6–8)	Dahlberg Arena (3,730); Missoula, MT
February 15, 2020; 6:00 pm, Pluto TV		at Montana State	L 63–77	10–16 (6–9)	Brick Breeden Fieldhouse (3,223); Bozeman, MT
February 22, 2020; 7:00 pm, KJZZ/Pluto TV		Southern Utah	W 82–71	11–16 (7–9)	Dee Events Center (6,141); Ogden, UT
February 29, 2020; 7:00 pm, Pluto TV		Portland State	L 83–89	11–17 (7–10)	Dee Events Center (5,422); Ogden, UT
March 2, 2020; 7:00 pm, Pluto TV		Idaho State	L 70–78	11–18 (7–11)	Dee Events Center (4,033); Ogden, UT
March 5, 2020; 7:30 pm, Pluto TV		at Idaho	W 72–64	12–18 (8–11)	Cowan Spectrum (807); Moscow, ID
March 7, 2020; 3:00 pm, Eleven/Pluto TV		at Eastern Washington	L 69-78	12-19 (8-12)	Reese Court; Cheney, WA
Big Sky tournament
March 11, 2020; 9:30 am, Pluto TV	(9)	vs. (8) Sacramento State; First round	L 54-62	12-20	CenturyLink Arena; Boise, ID
*Non-conference game. ^{#}Rankings from AP Poll. (#) Tournament seedings in parentheses. All times are in Mountain.
