= 2019–20 Northern Colorado Bears men's basketball team =

American college basketball season

2019–20 Northern Colorado Bears men's basketball
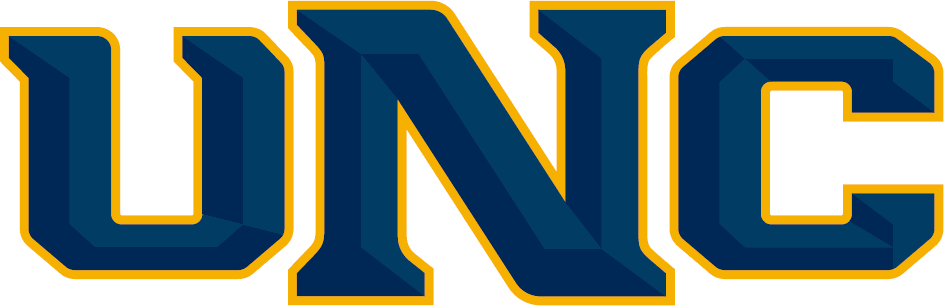
- Conference: Big Sky Conference
- Record: 22–9 (15–5 Big Sky)
- Head coach: Jeff Linder (4th season)
- Assistant coaches: Steve Smiley; Dorian Green; Ken DeWeese
- Home arena: Bank of Colorado Arena

2019–20 Big Sky men's basketball standings
	Conf.				Overall
Team	W		L	PCT	W		L	PCT
Eastern Washington	16	–	4	.800	23	–	8	.742
Northern Colorado	15	–	5	.750	22	–	9	.710
Montana	14	–	6	.700	18	–	13	.581
Portland State	12	–	8	.600	18	–	14	.563
Northern Arizona	10	–	10	.500	16	–	14	.533
Montana State	10	–	10	.500	16	–	15	.516
Southern Utah	9	–	11	.450	17	–	15	.531
Sacramento State	8	–	12	.400	16	–	14	.533
Weber State	8	–	12	.400	12	–	20	.375
Idaho State	4	–	16	.200	8	–	22	.267
Idaho	4	–	16	.200	8	–	24	.250
Note: The conference tournament was canceled prior to the quarterfinals due to the COVID-19 pandemic.

The 2019–20 Northern Colorado Bears men's basketball team represented the University of Northern Colorado during the 2019–20 NCAA Division I men's basketball season. The Bears were led by fourth-year head coach Jeff Linder and played their home games at Bank of Colorado Arena in Greeley, Colorado as members of the Big Sky Conference. They finished the season 22–9, 15–5 Big Sky play to finish in second place. Due to the ongoing coronavirus pandemic, all postseason tournaments were canceled including the Big Sky tournament.

On March 17, 2020, head coach Jeff Lindor was named the head coach at Wyoming. A few days later, the school promoted assistant coach Steve Smiley as the school's new head coach.

== Previous season ==
The Bears finished the 2018–19 season 21–11, 15–5 in Big Sky play to finish in second place. They lost in the quarterfinals of the Big Sky tournament to Southern Utah.

== Roster ==
2019–20 Northern Colorado Bears men's basketball team
Players
Coaches

Pos.	#	Name	Height	Weight	Year	Previous school	Hometown
G	0	Greg Bowwie III	6 ft 2 in (1.88 m)	180 lb (82 kg)	RS Jr	Athlos Leadership Academy; UT Rio Grande Valley	San Antonio, TX
G	1	Trent Harris	6 ft 1 in (1.85 m)	160 lb (73 kg)	Sr	Scottsbluff HS; Western Nebraska CC	Scottsbluff, NE
G	2	Matt Johnson (W)	6 ft 2 in (1.88 m)	180 lb (82 kg)	RS So	Rangeview HS	Aurora, CO
G	3	Tre'Shon Smoots	6 ft 1 in (1.85 m)	175 lb (79 kg)	RS Fr	Grant Union HS	Sacramento, CA
G	5	Sam Masten	6 ft 2 in (1.88 m)	175 lb (79 kg)	So	Rock Canyon HS	Littleton, CO
G	11	Rodrick McCobb	6 ft 5 in (1.96 m)	185 lb (84 kg)	Jr	Colony HS; Fullerton CC	Ontario, CA
G	12	Jonah Radebaugh	6 ft 3 in (1.91 m)	185 lb (84 kg)	RS Sr	Northglen HS	Thornton, CO
G	13	Bodie Hume	6 ft 6 in (1.98 m)	190 lb (86 kg)	So	Sterling HS	Sterling, CO
F	15	Kur Jockuch	6 ft 9 in (2.06 m)	220 lb (100 kg)	So	London Basketball Academy	London, Ontario, Canada
F	20	Malcolm Little	6 ft 3 in (1.91 m)	165 lb (75 kg)	Fr	Balboa School	San Diego, CA
F	23	Cole Nicholson	6 ft 6 in (1.98 m)	225 lb (102 kg)	Fr	Chaska HS	Chaska, MN
G	24	David Jabedo (W)	6 ft 4 in (1.93 m)	190 lb (86 kg)	RS Fr	Sand Creek HS	Colorado Springs, CO
F	25	Kai Edwards	6 ft 9 in (2.06 m)	225 lb (102 kg)	Sr	Canarias Basketball Academy	Amsterdam, Netherlands
F	43	Roy Grigsby	6 ft 9 in (2.06 m)	200 lb (91 kg)	RS Fr	Monarch HS	Superior, CO

Head coach

- Jeff Linder (Western Colorado)

Assistant coach(es)

- Dorian Green
- Ken DeWeese (Mary Hardin–Baylor)
- Vinnie McGhee (Cal State Northridge)

Legend

- (C) Team captain
- (S) Suspended
- (I) Ineligible
- (W) Walk-on
- Injured
- Current redshirt

Roster
Last update: January 9, 2020

== Schedule and results ==
Date time, TV	Rank^{#}	Opponent^{#}	Result	Record	Site (attendance) city, state
Non-conference regular season
Nov 5, 2019*; 6:00 pm, LHN		at Texas	L 45–69	0–1	Frank Erwin Center (8,208); Austin, TX
Nov 8, 2019*; 8:00 pm		Incarnate Word	W 83–61	1–1	Bank of Colorado Arena (1,455); Greeley, CO
Nov 12, 2019*; 8:00 pm		Colorado College	W 104–38	2–1	Bank of Colorado Arena (1,195); Greeley, CO
Nov 16, 2019*; 11:00 am, ESPN3		at Northern Iowa; Cancún Challenge	L 72–77	2–2	McLeod Center (3,580); Cedar Falls, IA
Nov 18, 2019*; 5:00 pm, ATTSNPT		at West Virginia; Cancún Challenge	L 61–69	2–3	WVU Coliseum (9,740); Morgantown, WV
Nov 26, 2019*; 1:00 pm		vs. Boston University; Cancún Challenge Mayan Division semifinals	W 78–55	3–3	Hard Rock Hotel Riviera Convention Center (253); Cancún, Mexico
Nov 27, 2019*; 1:00 pm		vs. Gardner–Webb; Cancún Challenge Mayan Division finals	L 62–67	3–4	Hard Rock Hotel Riviera Convention Center (107); Cancún, Mexico
Dec 4, 2019*; 7:00 pm		Northern New Mexico	W 92–47	4–4	Bank of Colorado Arena (887); Greeley, CO
Dec 14, 2019*; 7:00 pm		at Wyoming	W 74–53	5–4	Arena-Auditorium (3,083); Laramie, WY
Dec 17, 2019*; 7:00 pm		Denver	W 86–64	6–4	Bank of Colorado Arena (1,460); Greeley, CO
Dec 20, 2019*; 6:00 pm, ESPN+		at South Dakota	W 87–68	7–4	Sanford Coyote Sports Center (2,129); Vermillion, SD
Big Sky regular season
Dec 28, 2019; 3:00 pm		at Portland State	L 65–69	7–5 (0–1)	Viking Pavilion (902); Portland, OR
Jan 2, 2020; 7:00 pm		Montana State	W 68–59	8–5 (1–1)	Bank of Colorado Arena (1,288); Greeley, CO
Jan 4, 2020; 7:00 pm		Montana	W 74–66	9–5 (2–1)	Bank of Colorado Arena (1,431); Greeley, CO
Jan 9, 2020; 7:00 pm		at Weber State	W 65–64	10–5 (3–1)	Dee Events Center (4,022); Ogden, UT
Jan 16, 2020; 7:00 pm		Sacramento State	W 71–52	11–5 (4–1)	Bank of Colorado Arena (1,495); Greeley, CO
Jan 18, 2020; 2:00 pm		Northern Arizona	L 58–64	11–6 (4–2)	Bank of Colorado Arena (1,525); Greeley, CO
Jan 25, 2020; 3:00 pm		at Idaho	W 74–53	12–6 (5–2)	Cowan Spectrum (943); Moscow, ID
Jan 27, 2020; 7:00 pm		at Eastern Washington	W 89–84 ^{OT}	12–7 (5–3)	Reese Court (1,481); Cheney, WA
Jan 30, 2020; 7:00 pm		Idaho State	W 83–67	13–7 (6–3)	Bank of Colorado Arena (1,477); Greeley, CO
Feb 1, 2020; 7:00 pm		Weber State	W 70–52	14–7 (7–3)	Bank of Colorado Arena (1,776); Greeley, CO
Feb 6, 2020; 7:00 pm		at Southern Utah	W 68–60	15–7 (8–3)	America First Event Center (2,196); Cedar City, UT
Feb 10, 2020; 7:00 pm		Portland State	L 71–83	15–8 (8–4)	Bank of Colorado Arena (1,158); Greeley, CO
Feb 13, 2020; 6:00 pm		at Northern Arizona	W 84–54	16–8 (9–4)	Walkup Skydome (635); Flagstaff, AZ
Feb 15, 2020; 8:00 pm		at Sacramento State	W 68–65	17–8 (10–4)	Hornets Nest (998); Sacramento, CA
Feb 20, 2020; 7:00 pm		Southern Utah	W 68–66	18–8 (11–4)	Bank of Colorado Arena (1,503); Greeley, CO
Feb 22, 2020; 7:00 pm		at Idaho State	W 85–72	19–8 (12–4)	Reed Gym (1,405); Pocatello, ID
Feb 27, 2020; 7:00 pm		Idaho	W 93–49	20–8 (13–4)	Bank of Colorado Arena (1,721); Greeley, CO
Feb 29, 2020; 7:00 pm		Eastern Washington	L 64–68	20–9 (13–5)	Bank of Colorado Arena (2,582); Greeley, CO
Mar 5, 2020; 7:00 pm		at Montana	W 71–64	21–9 (14–5)	Dahlberg Arena (4,822); Missoula, MT
Mar 7, 2020; 4:00 pm		at Montana State	W 75–61	22–9 (15–5)	Brick Breeden Fieldhouse; Bozeman, MT
Big Sky tournament
Canceled
*Non-conference game. ^{#}Rankings from AP Poll. (#) Tournament seedings in parentheses. All times are in Mountain Time.
