= 2019–20 Idaho Vandals men's basketball team =

American college basketball season

2019–20 Idaho Vandals men's basketball
- Conference: Big Sky Conference
- Record: 8–24 (4–16 Big Sky)
- Head coach: Zac Claus (interim, 1st season)
- Assistant coaches: Tim Murphy; Doug Novsek; Kenny Tripp
- Home arena: Cowan Spectrum; Memorial Gym

2019–20 Big Sky men's basketball standings
	Conf.				Overall
Team	W		L	PCT	W		L	PCT
Eastern Washington	16	–	4	.800	23	–	8	.742
Northern Colorado	15	–	5	.750	22	–	9	.710
Montana	14	–	6	.700	18	–	13	.581
Portland State	12	–	8	.600	18	–	14	.563
Northern Arizona	10	–	10	.500	16	–	14	.533
Montana State	10	–	10	.500	16	–	15	.516
Southern Utah	9	–	11	.450	17	–	15	.531
Sacramento State	8	–	12	.400	16	–	14	.533
Weber State	8	–	12	.400	12	–	20	.375
Idaho State	4	–	16	.200	8	–	22	.267
Idaho	4	–	16	.200	8	–	24	.250
Note: The conference tournament was canceled prior to the quarterfinals due to the COVID-19 pandemic.

The 2019–20 Idaho Vandals men's basketball team represented the University of Idaho in the 2019–20 NCAA Division I men's basketball season. The Vandals, led by interim head coach Zac Claus, played their home games at the Cowan Spectrum, with a few early season games at Memorial Gym, in Moscow, Idaho, as members of the Big Sky Conference.

== Previous season ==
The Vandals finished the 2018–19 season 5–27 overall, 2–18 in Big Sky play to finish in last place. In the Big Sky Conference tournament, they lost to Montana State in the first round.

On June 14, it was announced that head coach Don Verlin's contract would be terminated, effectively ending his tenure with the Vandals. Four days later, on June 18, assistant coach Zac Claus was named interim head coach.

== Roster ==
2019–20 Idaho Vandals men's basketball team
Players
Coaches

Pos.	#	Name	Height	Weight	Year	Previous school	Hometown
F	0	Michael Hanshaw	6 ft 8 in (2.03 m)	210 lb (95 kg)	Fr	Westlake HS	Moorpark, California
G	1	Ja'Vary Christmas	6 ft 4 in (1.93 m)	170 lb (77 kg)	Jr	Sheridan College	Portland, Oregon
G	2	Damen Thacker	5 ft 11 in (1.8 m)	167 lb (76 kg)	Jr	Walla Walla CC	Meridian, Idaho
G	3	Keyshaad Dixon	6 ft 1 in (1.85 m)	188 lb (85 kg)	Jr	Ranger	Boston, Massachusetts
F	5	Quinton Forrest	6 ft 4 in (1.93 m)	225 lb (102 kg)	GS	Jacksonville	Windermere, Florida
G	10	Isaac Berglund	6 ft 2 in (1.88 m)	185 lb (84 kg)	Fr	Deer Park HS	Deer Park, Washington
G	11	BJ Simmons	6 ft 1 in (1.85 m)	182 lb (83 kg)	So	Trinity Valley	Saginaw, Michigan
G/F	12	Chance Garvin	6 ft 4 in (1.93 m)	179 lb (81 kg)	Jr	Lake Roosevelt High School	Coulee Dam, Washington
G	15	Marquell Fraser	6 ft 3 in (1.91 m)	200 lb (91 kg)	RS Jr	Midland College	Hamilton, Ontario
G	21	Gabe Quinnett	6 ft 4 in (1.93 m)	188 lb (85 kg)	Fr	Moscow HS	Moscow, Idaho
G	22	A.J. Youngman	6 ft 4 in (1.93 m)	201 lb (91 kg)	Jr	Otero; Eastern Kentucky	Peoria, Illinois
F	23	Babacar Thiombane	6 ft 7 in (2.01 m)	197 lb (89 kg)	Jr	East LA College; Army	Los Angeles, California
F	24	Khadim Samb	6 ft 6 in (1.98 m)	193 lb (88 kg)	So	Sprayberry HS	Marietta, Georgia
G	25	Trevon Allen	6 ft 2 in (1.88 m)	190 lb (86 kg)	Sr	Clarkston HS	Lapwai, Idaho
F	34	Scott Blakney	6 ft 8 in (2.03 m)	220 lb (100 kg)	Jr	Prosser HS	Prosser, Washington
C	41	Jack Wilson	7 ft 0 in (2.13 m)	247 lb (112 kg)	So	Oregon State	Montara, California

Head coach

- Zac Claus (Eastern Washington)

Assistant coach(es)

- Tim Murphy (Colorado State)
- Doug Novsek (Southern Illinois)
- Kenny Tripp (Regis)

Legend

- (C) Team captain
- (S) Suspended
- (I) Ineligible
- (W) Walk-on
- Injured
- Current redshirt

Roster
Last update: January 12, 2020

== Schedule and results ==
Date time, TV	Rank^{#}	Opponent^{#}	Result	Record	Site (attendance) city, state
Exhibition
October 22, 2019*; 7:00 pm		Central Washington	L 81–88		Memorial Gym (831); Moscow, ID
October 29, 2019*; 7:00 pm		Lewis–Clark State	L 73–88		Memorial Gym (1,039); Moscow, ID
Non-conference regular season
November 5, 2019*; 7:00 pm, Pluto TV		Evergreen State	W 88–82	1–0	Memorial Gym (905); Moscow, ID
November 9, 2019*; 2:00 pm		at UC Riverside	L 51–58	1–1	SRC Arena (463); Riverside, CA
November 14, 2019*; 3:00 pm		vs. UC Davis; Red Wolves Classic	L 64–65	1–2	First National Bank Arena (108); Jonesboro, AR
November 16, 2019*; 10:30 am		vs. VMI; Red Wolves Classic	W 68–67	2–2	First National Bank Arena (101); Jonesboro, AR
November 17, 2019*; 11:30 am		at Arkansas State; Red Wolves Classic	L 68–82	2–3	First National Bank Arena (987); Jonesboro, AR
November 23, 2019*; 7:00 pm, Pluto TV		Walla Walla	W 100–50	3–3	Memorial Gym (778); Moscow, ID
November 26, 2019*; 7:00 pm, Pluto TV		North Dakota State; Big Sky/Summit Challenge	L 53–70	3–4	Memorial Gym (792); Moscow, ID
November 30, 2019*; 7:00 pm		at Seattle	L 55–74	3–5	Redhawk Center (863); Seattle, WA
December 4, 2019*; 7:05 pm, SWX/Pluto TV		Washington State; Battle of the Palouse	L 65–78	3–6	Cowan Spectrum (1,316); Moscow, ID
December 14, 2019*; 4:00 pm, Pluto TV		Cal State Bakersfield	W 76–70 ^{OT}	4–6	Memorial Gym (956); Moscow, ID
December 21, 2019*; 10:00 am		at South Dakota State	L 57–85	4–7	Frost Arena (1,507); Brookings, SD
Big Sky regular season
December 28, 2019; 6:00 pm, Pluto TV		at Idaho State; Battle of the Domes	L 60–62	4–8 (0–1)	Reed Gym; Pocatello, ID
December 30, 2019; 6:00 pm, Pluto TV		at Weber State	L 68–69	4–9 (0–2)	Dee Events Center (4,222); Ogden, UT
January 2, 2020; 6:30 pm, Pluto TV		Portland State	W 72–61	5–9 (1–2)	Cowan Spectrum (831); Moscow, ID
January 9, 2020; 6:30 pm, Pluto TV		Montana State	L 68–71	5–10 (1–3)	Cowan Spectrum (879); Moscow, ID
January 16, 2020; 7:30 pm, Pluto TV		Eastern Washington	L 75–78	5–11 (1–4)	Cowan Spectrum (1,110); Moscow, ID
January 18, 2020; 6:00 pm, Pluto TV		at Montana	L 63–67	5–12 (1–5)	Dahlberg Arena (4,279); Missoula, MT
January 25, 2020; 2:00 pm, Pluto TV		Northern Colorado	L 53–74	5–13 (1–6)	Cowan Spectrum (943); Moscow, ID
January 27, 2020; 6:30 pm, Pluto TV		Southern Utah	L 45–73	5–14 (1–7)	Cowan Spectrum (914); Moscow, ID
February 1, 2020; 3:00 pm, Pluto TV		at Northern Arizona	L 72–77	5–15 (1–8)	Walkup Skydome (1,039); Flagstaff, AZ
February 3, 2020; 7:05 pm, Pluto TV		at Sacramento State	W 67–53	6–15 (2–8)	Hornets Nest (612); Sacramento, CA
February 6, 2020; 6:00 pm, Pluto TV		at Montana State	L 50–72	6–16 (2–9)	Brick Breeden Fieldhouse (2,574); Bozeman, MT
February 8, 2020; 6:30 pm, Pluto TV		Montana	L 71–82	6–17 (2–10)	Cowan Spectrum (1,804); Moscow, ID
February 13, 2020; 7:45 pm, Pluto TV		at Eastern Washington	W 74–71	7–17 (3–10)	Reese Court (1,576); Cheney, WA
February 17, 2020; 7:05 pm, Pluto TV		at Portland State	L 69–90	7–18 (3–11)	Viking Pavilion (1,043); Portland, OR
February 20, 2020; 6:30 pm, Pluto TV		Northern Arizona	L 61–78	7–19 (3–12)	Cowan Spectrum (1,201); Moscow, ID
February 22, 2020; 2:00 pm, Pluto TV		Sacramento State	L 56–67	7–20 (3–13)	Cowan Spectrum (974); Moscow, ID
February 27, 2020; 6:00 pm, Pluto TV		at Northern Colorado	L 49–93	7–21 (3–14)	Bank of Colorado Arena (1,721); Greeley, CO
February 29, 2020; 6:00 pm, Pluto TV		at Southern Utah	L 55–87	7–22 (3–15)	America First Event Center (2,174); Cedar City, UT
March 5, 2020; 6:30 pm, Pluto TV		Weber State	L 64–72	7–23 (3–16)	Cowan Spectrum (807); Moscow, ID
March 7, 2020; 2:00 pm, Pluto TV		Idaho State; Battle of the Domes	W 80-76	8-23 (4-16)	Cowan Spectrum; Moscow, ID
Big Sky tournament
March 11, 2020; 11:00 am, Pluto TV	(10)	vs. (7) Southern Utah; First round	L 69–75	8–24	CenturyLink Arena (2,503); Boise, ID
*Non-conference game. ^{#}Rankings from AP Poll. (#) Tournament seedings in parentheses. All times are in Pacific.
