= 2019–20 Pepperdine Waves men's basketball team =

American college basketball season

2019–20 Pepperdine Waves men's basketball
- Conference: West Coast Conference
- Record: 16–16 (8–8 WCC)
- Head coach: Lorenzo Romar (2nd, 5th overall season)
- Assistant coaches: Ken Bone; Curtis Allen; Gerald Brown
- Home arena: Firestone Fieldhouse

2019–20 West Coast Conference men's basketball standings
	Conf.				Overall
Team	W		L	PCT	W		L	PCT
No. 2 Gonzaga †	15	–	1	.938	31	–	2	.939
No. 14 BYU	13	–	3	.813	24	–	8	.750
Saint Mary's	11	–	5	.688	26	–	8	.765
Pacific	11	–	5	.688	23	–	10	.697
San Francisco	9	–	7	.563	22	–	12	.647
Pepperdine	8	–	8	.500	16	–	16	.500
Santa Clara	6	–	10	.375	20	–	13	.606
Loyola Marymount	4	–	12	.250	11	–	21	.344
San Diego	2	–	14	.125	9	–	23	.281
Portland	1	–	15	.063	9	–	23	.281
† 2020 WCC tournament winner Rankings from AP poll

The 2019–20 Pepperdine Waves men's basketball team represented Pepperdine University during the 2019–20 NCAA Division I men's basketball season. The Waves were led by head coach Lorenzo Romar, in the second season of his second stint after coaching the Waves from 1996 to 1999. They played their home games at the Firestone Fieldhouse in Malibu, California as members of the West Coast Conference. They finished the season 16–16, 8–8 in WCC play to finish in sixth place. They defeated Santa Clara in the second round of the WCC tournament before losing in the third round to Saint Mary's.

== Previous season ==
The Waves finished the 2018–19 season 16–18, 8–10 in WCC play to finish in eighth place. They defeated Pacific, Loyola Marymount, and San Francisco to advance to the semifinals of the WCC tournament where they were defeated by Gonzaga.

== Offseason ==
=== Departures ===
Name	Number	Pos.	Height	Weight	Year	Hometown	Reason for departure
Darnell Dunn	12	F	6'6"	205	Senior	Kinston, NC	Graduated
Eric Cooper Jr.	21	G	6'3"	190	RS Senior	Ontario, CA	Graduated
Kaijae Yee-Stephens	32	G	6'1"	190	RS Sophomore	Santa Cruz, CA	Left the team for personal reasons
Erik Mailliard	33	C	6'10"	210	RS Freshman	Dallas, TX	Walk-on; left the team for personal reasons
M. J. Cage	35	F	6'10"	225	Junior	Santa Ana, CA	Left the team for personal reasons

=== Incoming transfers ===
Name	Number	Pos.	Height	Weight	Year	Hometown	Previous school
Skylar Chavez	33	G/F	6'5"	195	Junior	San Anselmo, CA	Junior college transferred from Santa Rosa JC

=== Recruiting class of 2019 ===
College recruiting
Name	Hometown	School	Height	Weight	Commit date
Majok Deng; SF	Tucson, AZ	Salpointe Catholic High School	6 ft 5 in (1.96 m)	170 lb (77 kg)	Dec 20, 2018
Majok Deng; SF	Recruit ratings: Scout: Rivals: (70)				
Sedrick Altman; SG	Rialto, CA	Colony High School	6 ft 3 in (1.91 m)	160 lb (73 kg)	
Sedrick Altman; SG	Recruit ratings: Scout: Rivals: (NR)				
Jan Zidek; PF	Czech Republic		6 ft 9 in (2.06 m)	N/A	
Jan Zidek; PF	Recruit ratings: (NR)				
Overall recruit ranking: Scout: nr Rivals: nr ESPN: nr
Note: In many cases, Scout, Rivals, 247Sports, On3, and ESPN may conflict in their listings of height and weight.; In these cases, the average was taken. ESPN grades are on a 100-point scale.; Sources: "Pepperdine Waves 2019 Basketball Commitments". Rivals.; "2019 Pepperdine Waves Basketball Commits". Scout.; "ESPN 2019 Pepperdine Waves Basketball recruits". ESPN.; "Scout.com Team Recruiting Rankings". Scout.; "2019 Team Ranking". Rivals.

=== Recruiting class of 2020 ===
College recruiting (2020)
Name	Hometown	School	Height	Weight	Commit date
Kendall Munson; SF	Seattle, WA	Garfield High School	6 ft 9 in (2.06 m)	210 lb (95 kg)	Oct 9, 2019
Kendall Munson; SF	Recruit ratings: Scout: Rivals: (77)				
Overall recruit ranking: Scout: nr Rivals: nr ESPN: nr
Note: In many cases, Scout, Rivals, 247Sports, On3, and ESPN may conflict in their listings of height and weight.; In these cases, the average was taken. ESPN grades are on a 100-point scale.; Sources: "Pepperdine Waves 2020 Basketball Commitments". Rivals.; "2020 Pepperdine Waves Basketball Commits". Scout.; "ESPN 2020 Pepperdine Waves Basketball recruits". ESPN.; "Scout.com Team Recruiting Rankings". Scout.; "2020 Team Ranking". Rivals.

== Roster ==
2019–20 Pepperdine Waves men's basketball team
Players
Coaches

Pos.	#	Name	Height	Weight	Year	Previous school	Hometown
G	0	Sedrick Altman	6 ft 2 in (1.88 m)	180 lb (82 kg)	Fr	Colony HS	Rialto, CA
G	1	Robbie Skead (W)	6 ft 2 in (1.88 m)	180 lb (82 kg)	Sr	Ramapo HS	Wyckoff, NJ
G	2	Darryl Polk Jr.	5 ft 10 in (1.78 m)	155 lb (70 kg)	So	Long Beach Poly HS	Long Beach, CA
G	3	Michael Wexler (W)	5 ft 11 in (1.8 m)	175 lb (79 kg)	RS So	Benilde-St. Margaret's School	Plymouth, MN
G	4	Colbey Ross	6 ft 1 in (1.85 m)	180 lb (82 kg)	Jr	Eaglecrest HS	Aurora, CO
G	5	Jade' Smith	6 ft 4 in (1.93 m)	175 lb (79 kg)	Jr	St. Joseph Notre Dame HS	Oakland, CA
F	10	Andre Ball	6 ft 7 in (2.01 m)	190 lb (86 kg)	So	Chino Hills HS	Chino Hills, CA
G/F	11	Keith Smith	6 ft 7 in (2.01 m)	205 lb (93 kg)	RS Jr	Rainier Beach HS; Oregon	Seattle, WA
G	14	Jay Yoon (W)	6 ft 4 in (1.93 m)	195 lb (88 kg)	So	Arcadia HS	Arcadia, CA
F	15	Kessler Edwards	6 ft 8 in (2.03 m)	200 lb (91 kg)	So	Etiwanda HS	Rancho Cucamonga, CA
F	20	Kameron Edwards	6 ft 6 in (1.98 m)	230 lb (104 kg)	RS Sr	Etiwanda HS	Rancho Cucamonga, CA
G	22	Majok Deng	6 ft 5 in (1.96 m)	190 lb (86 kg)	Fr	Salpointe Catholic HS	Tucson, AZ
F	25	Everett Perrot (W)	6 ft 6 in (1.98 m)	215 lb (98 kg)	RS Fr	Christian Brothers HS	Elk Grove, CA
F	31	Jan Zidek	6 ft 9 in (2.06 m)	230 lb (104 kg)	Fr	Gymnasium Ota Pavel	Prague, Czech Republic
G	33	Skylar Chavez	6 ft 5 in (1.96 m)	185 lb (84 kg)	Jr	Drake HS; Santa Rosa JC	Woodacre, CA
C	34	Victor Ohia Obioha	6 ft 9 in (2.06 m)	205 lb (93 kg)	So	Hillcrest HS	Owerri, Nigeria
C	50	Jackson Stormo	6 ft 8 in (2.03 m)	250 lb (113 kg)	So	San Marcos HS	Santa Barbara, California

Head coach

- Lorenzo Romar (Washington)

Assistant coach(es)

- Ken Bone (Seattle Pacific)
- Curtis Allen (Washington)
- Gerald Brown (Pepperdine)

Legend

- (C) Team captain
- (S) Suspended
- (I) Ineligible
- (W) Walk-on
- Injured
- Current redshirt

Roster

== Schedule and results ==
Date time, TV	Rank^{#}	Opponent^{#}	Result	Record	High points	High rebounds	High assists	Site (attendance) city, state
Non conference regular season
November 5, 2019*; 7:00 pm, P12N		at California	L 71–87	0–1	19 – Ross	4 – 4 tied	7 – Ross	Haas Pavilion (3,780); Berkeley, CA
November 9, 2019*; 5:00 pm		UC Irvine	W 77–73	1–1	21 – Ka. Edwards	10 – Ka. Edwards	8 – Ross	Firestone Fieldhouse (1,475); Malibu, CA
November 12, 2019*; 7:00 pm		at Cal State Northridge	W 94–82	2–1	22 – Tied	15 – Ke. Edwards	12 – Ross	Matadome (1,321); Northridge, CA
November 16, 2019*; 5:30 pm, ESPN3		at Abilene Christian	W 73–69	3–1	22 – Ross	8 – Ke. Edwards	6 – Ross	Moody Coliseum (2,553); Abilene, TX
November 19, 2019*; 6:00 pm, P12N		at USC	L 84–91	3–2	38 – Ross	6 – Ross	3 – Ross	Galen Center (2,139); Los Angeles, CA
November 23, 2019*; 7:00 pm		Sacramento State	L 72–77	3–3	20 – Ka. Edwards	11 – Ke. Edwards	6 – Ross	Firestone Fieldhouse (600); Malibu, CA
November 28, 2019*; 8:00 pm, ESPN2		vs. No. 14 Arizona; Wooden Legacy quarterfinals	L 91–93	3–4	21 – Ka. Edwards	9 – Smith	9 – Ross	Anaheim Arena (1,574); Anaheim, CA
November 29, 2019*; 6:00 pm, ESPNews		vs. UCF; Wooden Legacy consolation 2nd round	L 65–78	3–5	21 – Ke. Edwards	6 – Ke. Edwards	12 – Ross	Anaheim Arena; Anaheim, CA
December 1, 2019*; 3:30 pm, ESPNU		vs. Providence; Wooden Legacy 7th place game	L 77–80	3–6	29 – Ross	10 – Ka. Edwards	6 – Polk Jr.	Anaheim Arena; Anaheim, CA
December 6, 2019*; 6:00 pm		Idaho State	W 77–65	4–6	23 – Ke. Edwards	12 – Ke. Edwards	8 – Ross	Firestone Fieldhouse (1,150); Malibu, CA
December 14, 2019*; 5:00 pm		Central Arkansas	W 92–79	5–6	30 – Ke. Edwards	12 – Ke. Edwards	8 – Ross	Firestone Fieldhouse (835); Malibu, CA
December 17, 2019*; 7:00 pm		Portland State	W 77–71	6–6	31 – Ross	12 – Ka. Edwards	5 – Ross	Firestone Fieldhouse (745); Malibu, CA
December 21, 2019*; 1:00 pm		Northern Arizona	W 75–73	7–6	27 – Ross	9 – Ke. Edwards	6 – Ross	Firestone Fieldhouse (801); Malibu, CA
December 28, 2019*; 6:00 pm		at San Jose State	L 68–83	7–7	19 – Ka. Edwards	7 – Altman	11 – Ross	Provident Credit Union Event Center (1,333); San Jose, CA
WCC regular season
January 2, 2020; 7:00 pm		Pacific	L 56–59	7–8 (0–1)	15 – Ross	7 – Tied	4 – Ross	Firestone Fieldhouse (1,015); Malibu, CA
January 4, 2020; 7:00 pm, ESPN2		at No. 1 Gonzaga	L 70–75	7–9 (0–2)	24 – Ross	10 – Ka. Edwards	10 – Ross	McCarthey Athletic Center (6,000); Spokane, WA
January 11, 2020; 7:00 pm		at San Diego	W 85–78	8–9 (1–2)	23 – Ka. Edwards	8 – Ka. Edwards	7 – Ross	Jenny Craig Pavilion (1,490); San Diego, CA
January 16, 2020; 6:00 pm, SPECSN		Loyola Marymount	W 75–67	9–9 (2–2)	20 – Ross	8 – Ke. Edwards	8 – Ross	Firestone Fieldhouse (1,474); Malibu, CA
January 18, 2020; 1:00 pm, CBSSN		Saint Mary's	L 69–78	9–10 (2–3)	24 – Ross	9 – Ka. Edwards	6 – Ross	Firestone Fieldhouse (1,219); Malibu, CA
January 23, 2020; 7:00 pm		at Santa Clara	W 90–86 ^{OT}	10–10 (3–3)	24 – Ross	14 – Ka. Edwards	9 – Ross	Leavey Center (1,914); Santa Clara, CA
January 25, 2020; 5:00 pm		Portland	W 80–69	11–10 (4–3)	24 – Chavez	8 – Ka. Edwards	7 – Ross	Firestone Fieldhouse (1,315); Malibu, CA
January 30, 2020; 5:30 pm, CBSSN		at BYU	L 80–107	11–11 (4–4)	20 – Ka. Edwards	7 – Ohia Obioha	7 – Ross	Marriott Center (10,989); Provo, UT
February 1, 2020; 3:00 pm, SPECSN		at Loyola Marymount	W 68–67 ^{OT}	12–11 (5–4)	27 – Ka. Edwards	5 – Tied	7 – Ross	Gersten Pavilion (1,427); Los Angeles, CA
February 6, 2020; 7:00 pm		Santa Clara	W 91–77	13–11 (6–4)	23 – Ross	9 – Tied	9 – Ross	Firestone Fieldhouse (1,349); Malibu, CA
February 8, 2020; 7:00 pm		at Pacific	L 78–79	13–12 (6–5)	28 – Ross	9 – Ke. Edwards	5 – Ross	Alex G. Spanos Center (2,707); Stockton, CA
February 13, 2020; 8:00 pm, SPECSN		San Diego	W 72–69	14–12 (7–5)	21 – Ross	9 – Altman	8 – Ross	Firestone Fieldhouse (1,275); Malibu, CA
February 15, 2020; 7:00 pm, ESPN		No. 2 Gonzaga	L 77–89	14–13 (7–6)	23 – Ross	8 – Ke. Edwards	6 – Ross	Firestone Fieldhouse (3,104); Malibu, CA
February 20, 2020; 6:00 pm, SPECSN		at Portland	W 66–59	15–13 (8–6)	30 – Ross	14 – Ross	5 – Ross	Chiles Center (1,679); Portland, OR
February 22, 2020; 3:00 pm, SPECSN		at San Francisco	L 61–63 ^{OT}	15–14 (8–7)	20 – Ross	11 – Ke. Edwards	7 – Ross	War Memorial Gymnasium (2,937); San Francisco, CA
February 29, 2020; 3:00 pm, CBSSN		No. 17 BYU	L 64–81	15–15 (8–8)	24 – Ke. Edwards	11 – Ke. Edwards	7 – Ross	Firestone Fieldhouse (3,104); Malibu, CA
WCC tournament
March 6, 2020; 8:00 pm, BYUtv	(6)	vs. (7) Santa Clara; Second round	W 84–73	16–15	21 – Ka. Edwards	16 – Ka. Edwards	8 – Ross	Orleans Arena (3,850); Paradise, NV
March 7, 2020; 9:00 pm, ESPN2	(6)	vs. (3) Saint Mary's; Third round	L 82–89 ^{2OT}	16–16	43 – Ross	10 – Ke. Edwards	5 – Ross	Orleans Arena (4,350); Paradise, NV
*Non-conference game. ^{#}Rankings from AP Poll. (#) Tournament seedings in parentheses. All times are in Pacific Time.
