= 2019–20 Southern Utah Thunderbirds men's basketball team =

American college basketball season

2019–20 Southern Utah Thunderbirds men's basketball
- Conference: Big Sky Conference
- Record: 17–15 (9–11 Big Sky)
- Head coach: Todd Simon (4th season)
- Assistant coaches: John Wardenburg; Chris Pompey; Flynn Clayman
- Home arena: America First Event Center

2019–20 Big Sky men's basketball standings
	Conf.				Overall
Team	W		L	PCT	W		L	PCT
Eastern Washington	16	–	4	.800	23	–	8	.742
Northern Colorado	15	–	5	.750	22	–	9	.710
Montana	14	–	6	.700	18	–	13	.581
Portland State	12	–	8	.600	18	–	14	.563
Northern Arizona	10	–	10	.500	16	–	14	.533
Montana State	10	–	10	.500	16	–	15	.516
Southern Utah	9	–	11	.450	17	–	15	.531
Sacramento State	8	–	12	.400	16	–	14	.533
Weber State	8	–	12	.400	12	–	20	.375
Idaho State	4	–	16	.200	8	–	22	.267
Idaho	4	–	16	.200	8	–	24	.250
Note: The conference tournament was canceled prior to the quarterfinals due to the COVID-19 pandemic.

The 2019–20 Southern Utah Thunderbirds basketball team represented Southern Utah University during the 2019–20 NCAA Division I men's basketball season. The Thunderbirds were led by fourth-year head coach Todd Simon and played their home games at the America First Event Center in Cedar City, Utah as members of the Big Sky Conference.

== Previous season ==
The Thunderbirds finished the 2018–19 season 17–17 overall, 9–11 in Big Sky play, finishing in 7th place. In the Big Sky tournament, they defeated Idaho State in the first round, upset No. 2 seeded Northern Colorado in the quarterfinals, before falling to Northern Colorado in the semifinals. They were invited to the CIT, where they defeated Drake in the first round, before losing to Cal State Bakersfield in the second round.

== Roster ==
2019–20 Southern Utah Thunderbirds men's basketball team
Players
Coaches

Pos.	#	Name	Height	Weight	Year	Previous school	Hometown
G	0	Damani McEntire	6 ft 4 in (1.93 m)	179 lb (81 kg)	Fr	Hargrave Military Academy	Indianapolis, IN
G	1	Jakolby Long	6 ft 5 in (1.96 m)	208 lb (94 kg)	RS Fr	Mustang HS; Iowa State	Mustang, OK
G	3	John III Knight	6 ft 3 in (1.91 m)	205 lb (93 kg)	Jr	Callaway HS; Utah State	Jackson, MS
G	4	Dre Marin	6 ft 0 in (1.83 m)	170 lb (77 kg)	Jr	Apollo HS	Glendale, AZ
F	12	Maizen Fausett	6 ft 6 in (1.98 m)	225 lb (102 kg)	So	Westlake HS	Saratoga Springs, UT
G	13	Chase Verdugo	6 ft 3 in (1.91 m)	174 lb (79 kg)	Fr	Walden Grove HS	Sahuarita, AZ
C	14	Daouda N'Diaye	7 ft 0 in (2.13 m)	215 lb (98 kg)	RS Sr	Windermere Prep; Illinois State	Dakar, Senegal
G	15	Harrison Butler	6 ft 5 in (1.96 m)	220 lb (100 kg)	So	Mater Dei HS	Santa Ana, CA
G	21	Josh Cornish	6 ft 2 in (1.88 m)	165 lb (75 kg)	RS Fr	Dulaney HS	Cockeysville, MD
G/F	23	Cameron Olutiyan	6 ft 7 in (2.01 m)	195 lb (88 kg)	RS Sr	Clements HS; Boise State	Sugar Land, TX
F	23	Dwayne Morgan	6 ft 8 in (2.03 m)	218 lb (99 kg)	RS Sr	St. Frances Academy; UNLV	Baltimore, MD
F	32	Andre Adams	6 ft 9 in (2.06 m)	230 lb (104 kg)	Sr	Westview HS; Arizona State	Avondale, AZ
F	33	Jarryd Hoppo	6 ft 9 in (2.06 m)	186 lb (84 kg)	Fr	Westminster School	Adelaide, South Australia

Head coach

- Todd Simon (UNLV)

Assistant coach(es)

- John Wardenburg (BYU)
- Chris Pompey (Pittsburgh)
- Flynn Clayman (Troy)

Legend

- (C) Team captain
- (S) Suspended
- (I) Ineligible
- (W) Walk-on
- Injured
- Current redshirt

Roster
Last update: August 14, 2024

== Schedule and results ==
Date time, TV	Rank^{#}	Opponent^{#}	Result	Record	Site (attendance) city, state
Regular season
November 5, 2019*; 7:00 p.m., Pluto TV		Bethesda	W 110–66	1–0	America First Event Center (2,087); Cedar City, UT
November 9, 2019*; 12:00 p.m., BTN+		at Nebraska	W 79–78 ^{2OT}	1–1	Pinnacle Bank Arena (15,828); Lincoln, NE
November 13, 2019*; 7:00 p.m.		at BYU; Maui Invitational campus-site game	L 63–68	1–2	Marriott Center (10,661); Provo, UT
November 18, 2019*; 9:00 p.m., P12N		at UCLA; Maui Invitational campus-site game	L 61–76	1–3	Pauley Pavilion (4,427); Los Angeles, CA
November 23, 2019*; 11:30 a.m.		vs. Charleston Southern; Maui on the Mainland	W 80–45	2–3	Freedom Hall Civic Center (2,526); Johnson City, TN
November 24, 2019*; 2:00 p.m., ESPN+		at East Tennessee State; Maui on the Mainland	L 58–70	3–3	Freedom Hall Civic Center (4,053); Johnson City, TN
November 29, 2019*; 12:00 p.m., Pluto TV		West Coast Baptist	W 126–40	4–3	America First Event Center (1,501); Cedar City, UT
December 1, 2019*; 2:00 p.m., WCC Network		at Loyola Marymount	L 51–61	4–4	Gersten Pavilion (622); Los Angeles, CA
December 7, 2019*; 2:00 p.m.		Utah Valley	W 73–72	5–4	America First Event Center (3,017); Cedar City, UT
December 14, 2019*; 2:00 p.m., Pluto TV		UC Santa Barbara	W 62–61	6–4	America First Event Center (1,810); Cedar City, UT
December 19, 2019*; 8:00 p.m.		at Long Beach State	W 84–63	7–4	Walter Pyramid (1,336); Long Beach, CA
December 30, 2019; 8:00 p.m.		at Portland State	W 83–81	8–4 (1–0)	Viking Pavilion (755); Portland, OR
January 2, 2020; 7:00 p.m., Pluto TV		Montana	L 58–60	8–5 (1–1)	America First Event Center (2,059); Cedar City, UT
January 4, 2020; 2:00 p.m., Pluto TV		Montana State	W 59–53	9–5 (2–1)	America First Event Center (1,806); Cedar City, UT
January 9, 2020; 7:00 p.m.		at Idaho State	W 71–55	10–5 (3–1)	Reed Gym (1,332); Pocatello, ID
January 16, 2020; 7:00 p.m., Pluto TV		Northern Arizona	L 72–75	10–6 (3–2)	America First Event Center (3,346); Cedar City, UT
January 18, 2020; 1:00 p.m., Pluto TV		Sacramento State	W 74–49	11–6 (4–2)	America First Event Center (2,018); Cedar City, UT
January 25, 2020; 3:00 p.m.		at Eastern Washington	L 78–81 ^{OT}	11–7 (4–3)	Reese Court (1,561); Cheney, WA
January 27, 2020; 7:30 p.m.		at Idaho	W 73–45	12–7 (5–3)	Cowan Spectrum (914); Moscow, ID
January 30, 2020; 7:00 p.m., Pluto TV		Weber State	L 65–75	12–8 (5–4)	America First Event Center (4,021); Cedar City, UT
February 1, 2020; 7:00 p.m., Pluto TV		Idaho State	W 80–75	13–8 (6–4)	America First Event Center (2,163); Cedar City, UT
February 6, 2020; 7:00 p.m., Pluto TV		Northern Colorado	L 60–68	13–9 (6–5)	America First Event Center (2,196); Cedar City, UT
February 8, 2020; 2:00 p.m., Pluto TV		Portland State	W 85–57	14–9 (7–5)	America First Event Center (2,085); Cedar City, UT
February 13, 2020; 8:00 p.m.		at Sacramento State	L 55–70	14–10 (7–6)	Hornets Nest (914); Sacramento, CA
February 15, 2020; 4:00 p.m.		at Northern Arizona	L 69–82	14–11 (7–7)	Walkup Skydome (678); Flagstaff, AZ
February 20, 2020; 7:00 p.m.		at Northern Colorado	L 66–68	14–12 (7–8)	Bank of Colorado Arena (1,503); Greeley, CO
February 22, 2020; 7:00 p.m.		at Weber State	L 71–82	14–13 (7–9)	Dee Events Center (6,141); Ogden, UT
February 27, 2020; 7:00 p.m., Pluto TV		Eastern Washington	L 51–69	14–14 (7–10)	America First Event Center (2,368); Cedar City, UT
February 29, 2020; 7:00 p.m., Pluto TV		Idaho	W 87–55	15–14 (8–10)	America First Event Center (2,174); Cedar City, UT
March 5, 2020; 7:00 p.m.		at Montana State	L 65–73	15–15 (8–11)	Brick Breeden Fieldhouse (3,073); Bozeman, MT
March 7, 2020; 7:00 p.m.		at Montana	W 85–80 ^{OT}	16–15 (9–11)	Dahlberg Arena; Missoula, MT
Big Sky tournament
March 11, 2020; 12:00 p.m., Pluto TV	(7)	vs. (10) Idaho; First round	W 75–69	17–15	CenturyLink Arena (2,503); Boise, ID
*Non-conference game. ^{#}Rankings from AP poll. (#) Tournament seedings in parentheses. All times are in Mountain.
