= 2019–20 Montana State Bobcats men's basketball team =

American college basketball season

2019–20 Montana State Bobcats men's basketball
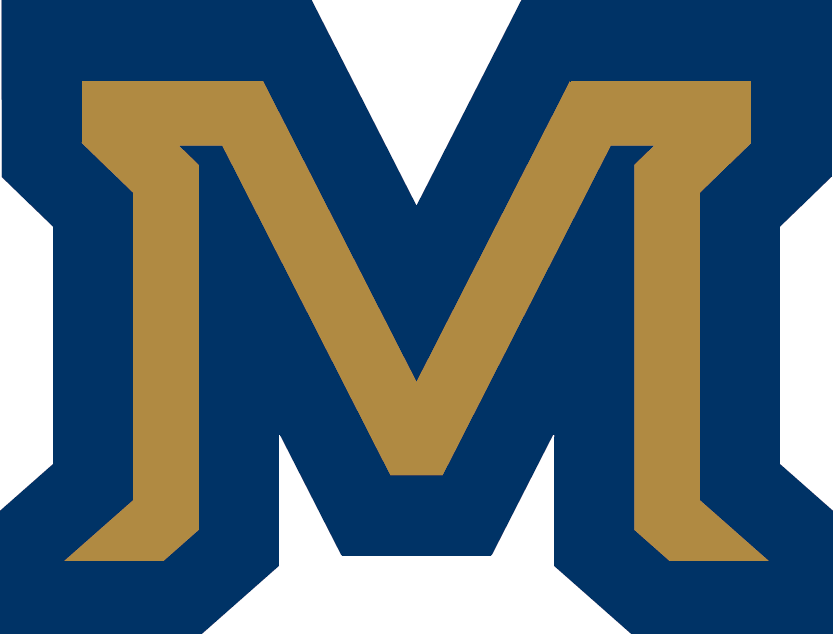
- Conference: Big Sky Conference
- Record: 16–15 (10–10 Big Sky)
- Head coach: Danny Sprinkle (1st season)
- Assistant coaches: Chris Haslam; Shawn Dirden; Dan Russell
- Home arena: Brick Breeden Fieldhouse

2019–20 Big Sky men's basketball standings
	Conf.				Overall
Team	W		L	PCT	W		L	PCT
Eastern Washington	16	–	4	.800	23	–	8	.742
Northern Colorado	15	–	5	.750	22	–	9	.710
Montana	14	–	6	.700	18	–	13	.581
Portland State	12	–	8	.600	18	–	14	.563
Northern Arizona	10	–	10	.500	16	–	14	.533
Montana State	10	–	10	.500	16	–	15	.516
Southern Utah	9	–	11	.450	17	–	15	.531
Sacramento State	8	–	12	.400	16	–	14	.533
Weber State	8	–	12	.400	12	–	20	.375
Idaho State	4	–	16	.200	8	–	22	.267
Idaho	4	–	16	.200	8	–	24	.250
Note: The conference tournament was canceled prior to the quarterfinals due to the COVID-19 pandemic.

The 2019–20 Montana State Bobcats men's basketball team represented Montana State University during the 2019–20 NCAA Division I men's basketball season. The Bobcats, led by first-year head coach Danny Sprinkle, play their home games at Brick Breeden Fieldhouse in Bozeman, Montana as members of the Big Sky Conference.

== Previous season ==
The Bobcats finished the 2018–19 season finished the season 15–17, 11–9 in Big Sky play to finish in a three-way tie for fourth place. They defeated Idaho in the first round of the Big Sky tournament before losing in the quarterfinals to Eastern Washington.

On March 17 2019, head coach Brian Fish was fired. He finished at Montana State with a five-year record of 65–92.

== Roster ==
2019–20 Montana State Bobcats men's basketball team
Players
Coaches

Pos.	#	Name	Height	Weight	Year	Previous school	Hometown
F	0	Zeke Quinlan	6 ft 8 in (2.03 m)	220 lb (100 kg)	So	Life Christian/Hillcrest Prep	Portland, OR
G	1	Xavier Bishop	5 ft 8 in (1.73 m)	150 lb (68 kg)	Sr	Lanphier HS; UMKC	Springfield, IL
F	2	Quentin Guliford	6 ft 6 in (1.98 m)	200 lb (91 kg)	So	Liberty HS	Peoria, AZ
F	3	Finn Fleute	6 ft 9 in (2.06 m)	235 lb (107 kg)	Fr	UNI Paderborn Baskets	Essen, Germany
G	4	Amin Adamu	6 ft 4 in (1.93 m)	190 lb (86 kg)	Jr	Barking Abbey School; Casper College	London, England
G	5	Harald Frey	6 ft 2 in (1.88 m)	180 lb (82 kg)	Sr	Wang Sports Academy	Oslo, Norway
G	10	Caleb Bellach	6 ft 5 in (1.96 m)	190 lb (86 kg)	Fr	Manhattan Christian HS	Manhattan, MT
F	11	Ladan Ricketts	6 ft 5 in (1.96 m)	185 lb (84 kg)	Sr	Park HS; Sheridan College	Livingston, MT
G	12	Gavin Gundlach	5 ft 11 in (1.8 m)	155 lb (70 kg)	Jr	Custer County HS; Miles CC	Miles City, MT
F	13	Jubrile Belo	6 ft 9 in (2.06 m)	240 lb (109 kg)	So	Barking Abbey School; Lamar CC	London, England
G	15	Mychael Paulo	6 ft 4 in (1.93 m)	160 lb (73 kg)	Jr	Father Henry Carr HS; Williston State	Toronto, Ontario, Canada
G	22	Brent Finn	6 ft 1 in (1.85 m)	180 lb (82 kg)	Sr	Sweet Grass County HS; Texas A&M International	Big Timber, MT
F	23	Borja Fernandez	6 ft 7 in (2.01 m)	245 lb (111 kg)	Fr	FC Barcelona U18	Bilbao, Spain
G	24	Zach Hobbs	6 ft 5 in (1.96 m)	195 lb (88 kg)	Fr	Mesa HS	Mesa, AZ
F	31	Devin Kirby	6 ft 11 in (2.11 m)	210 lb (95 kg)	RS Jr	Basha HS	Chandler, AZ

Head coach

- Danny Sprinkle (Montana State)

Assistant coach(es)

- Chris Haslam (Wyoming)
- Shawn Dirden (Idaho)
- Dan Russell (Wyoming)

Legend

- (C) Team captain
- (S) Suspended
- (I) Ineligible
- (W) Walk-on
- Injured
- Current redshirt

Roster
Last update: January 10, 2020

== Schedule and results ==
Date time, TV	Rank^{#}	Opponent^{#}	Result	Record	Site (attendance) city, state
Exhibition
Oct 30, 2019*; 7:00 pm		Yellowstone Christian	W 94–43		Brick Breeden Fieldhouse (1,339); Bozeman, MT
Non-conference regular season
Nov 5, 2019*; 8:00 pm, RTNW		at No. 17 Utah State	L 73–81	0–1	Smith Spectrum (7,331); Logan, UT
Nov 9, 2019*; 4:00 pm		Rocky Mountain	W 93–60	1–1	Brick Breeden Fieldhouse (2,697); Bozeman, MT
Nov 15, 2019*; 2:30 pm		vs. Appalachian State; Spartan Invitational	W 59–56	2–1	Fleming Gymnasium (214); Greensboro, NC
Nov 16, 2019*; 4:00 pm, ESPN3		at UNC Greensboro; Spartan Invitational	W 67–66	3–1	Fleming Gymnasium (2,066); Greensboro, NC
Nov 17, 2019*; 10:00 am		vs. Tennessee Tech; Spartan Invitational	W 52–39	4–1	Fleming Gymnasium (65); Greensboro, NC
Nov 19, 2019*; 7:00 pm, ESPN3		at Grand Canyon	L 56–69	4–2	GCU Arena (6,862); Phoenix, AZ
Nov 26, 2019*; 7:00 pm		Colorado Christian	W 82–46	5–2	Brick Breeden Fieldhouse (2,574); Bozeman, MT
Nov 30, 2019*; 6:00 pm		Green Bay	L 72–98	5–3	Brick Breeden Fieldhouse (3,023); Bozeman, MT
Dec 5, 2019*; 8:00 pm, SWX MT		South Dakota State; Big Sky/Summit Challenge	W 77–70	6–3	Brick Breeden Fieldhouse (4,877); Bozeman, MT
Dec 16, 2019*; 6:00 pm, ESPN+		at North Dakota State; Big Sky/Summit Challenge	L 65–79	6–4	Scheels Center (2,523); Fargo, ND
Dec 19, 2019*; 8:00 pm, ESPN3		at Cal State Bakersfield	L 51–66	6–5	Icardo Center (1,877); Bakersfield, CA
Big Sky regular season
Dec 28, 2019; 4:00 pm		Sacramento State	W 66–51	7–5 (1–0)	Brick Breeden Fieldhouse (3,349); Bozeman, MT
Dec 30, 2019; 7:00 pm, Eleven		Northern Arizona	W 63–61	8–5 (2–0)	Brick Breeden Fieldhouse (3,196); Bozeman, MT
Jan 2, 2020; 7:00 pm		at Northern Colorado	L 59–68	8–6 (2–1)	Bank of Colorado Arena (1,288); Greeley, CO
Jan 4, 2020; 2:00 pm		at Southern Utah	L 53–59	8–7 (2–2)	America First Event Center (1,806); Cedar City, UT
Jan 9, 2020; 7:30 pm		at Idaho	W 71–69	9–7 (3–2)	Cowan Spectrum (879); Moscow, ID
Jan 11, 2020; 6:00 pm, SWX MT		Portland State	L 76–77	9–8 (3–3)	Brick Breeden Fieldhouse (3,071); Bozeman, MT
Jan 18, 2020; 4:00 pm, SWX MT		Eastern Washington	L 58–71	9–9 (3–4)	Brick Breeden Fieldhouse (3,713); Bozeman, MT
Jan 23, 2020; 7:00 pm		at Weber State	W 62–61	10–9 (4–4)	Dee Events Center (1,456); Ogden, UT
Jan 25, 2020; 7:00 pm		at Idaho State	W 75–64	11–9 (5–4)	Reed Gym (1,456); Pocatello, ID
Feb 1, 2020; 7:00 pm, SWX MT		at Montana	L 64–78	11–10 (5–5)	Dahlberg Arena (7,040); Missoula, MT
Feb 6, 2020; 7:00 pm		Idaho	W 72–50	12–10 (6–5)	Brick Breeden Fieldhouse (2,574); Bozeman, MT
Feb 8, 2020; 3:00 pm, SWX MT		at Eastern Washington	L 49–74	12–11 (6–6)	Reese Court (1,529); Cheney, WA
Feb 13, 2020; 7:00 pm		Idaho State	W 73–69	13–11 (7–6)	Brick Breeden Fieldhouse (3,028); Bozeman, MT
Feb 15, 2020; 6:00 pm, SWX MT		Weber State	W 77–63	14–11 (8–6)	Brick Breeden Fieldhouse (3,223); Bozeman, MT
Feb 20, 2020; 8:00 pm, Eleven		at Portland State	L 77–87	14–12 (8–7)	Viking Pavilion (1,242); Portland, OR
Feb 22, 2020; 7:00 pm, SWX MT		Montana	L 54–59	14–13 (8–8)	Brick Breeden Fieldhouse (6,570); Bozeman, MT
Feb 27, 2020; 8:00 pm		at Sacramento State	L 52–81	14–14 (8–9)	Hornets Nest (786); Sacramento, CA
Feb 29, 2020; 4:00 pm		at Northern Arizona	W 63–57	15–14 (9–9)	Walkup Skydome (1,164); Flagstaff, AZ
Mar 5, 2020; 7:00 pm		Southern Utah	W 73–65	16–14 (10–9)	Brick Breeden Fieldhouse (3,073); Bozeman, MT
Mar 7, 2020; 4:00 pm, SWX MT		Northern Colorado	L 61–75	16–15 (10–10)	Brick Breeden Fieldhouse; Bozeman, MT
Big Sky tournament
Mar 12, 2020; 2:30 pm, Pluto TV/Eleven Sports	(5)	vs. (4) Portland State; Quarterfinals	Canceled due to the COVID-19 pandemic		CenturyLink Arena; Boise, ID
*Non-conference game. ^{#}Rankings from AP Poll. (#) Tournament seedings in parentheses. All times are in Mountain Time.
