= 2019–20 Northern Arizona Lumberjacks men's basketball team =

American college basketball season

2019–20 Northern Arizona Lumberjacks men's basketball
- Conference: Big Sky Conference
- Record: 16–14 (10–10 Big Sky)
- Head coach: Shane Burcar (interim, 1st season)
- Assistant coaches: Gaellan Bewernick (1st season); Tyler Ojanen (1st season); Justin McLean (1st season)
- Captains: Brooks DeBisschop; Luke Avdalovic; Cameron Shelton
- Home arena: Walkup Skydome

2019–20 Big Sky men's basketball standings
	Conf.				Overall
Team	W		L	PCT	W		L	PCT
Eastern Washington	16	–	4	.800	23	–	8	.742
Northern Colorado	15	–	5	.750	22	–	9	.710
Montana	14	–	6	.700	18	–	13	.581
Portland State	12	–	8	.600	18	–	14	.563
Northern Arizona	10	–	10	.500	16	–	14	.533
Montana State	10	–	10	.500	16	–	15	.516
Southern Utah	9	–	11	.450	17	–	15	.531
Sacramento State	8	–	12	.400	16	–	14	.533
Weber State	8	–	12	.400	12	–	20	.375
Idaho State	4	–	16	.200	8	–	22	.267
Idaho	4	–	16	.200	8	–	24	.250
Note: The conference tournament was canceled prior to the quarterfinals due to the COVID-19 pandemic.

The 2019–20 Northern Arizona Lumberjacks men's basketball team represent Northern Arizona University in the 2019–20 NCAA Division I men's basketball season. The Lumberjacks, led by interim head coach Shane Burcar, played their home games at the Walkup Skydome in Flagstaff, Arizona, with their non-conference home games at Rolle Activity Center, and one at Findlay Toyota Center, as members of the Big Sky Conference.

On June 2, 2019, it was announced that head coach Jack Murphy would be stepping down, in order to take the associate head coaching position at his alma mater, Arizona. Assistant coach Shane Burcar was named the interim head coach for the 2019–20 season. Under Coach Burcar, the Lumberjacks posted their best season in five years. The 'Jacks 16 victories surpassed the program's total from the previous two years combined.

NAU concluded non-conference play with a 6–3 record, its best in nine years. That included back-to-back road wins at Utah Valley and UC Riverside. It was the program's first pair of consecutive non-conference road wins in nine years as well.

NAU began conference play 1–4 before winning their next five games. The five-game winning streak was the Lumberjacks' longest since the 2010–11 season. It included three straight victories from double-digit deficits and NAU's first Big Sky road sweep in six years at Southern Utah and Northern Colorado. On February 27, 2020, the 'Jacks shocked Montana, who entered the night in first-place, for a 57–56 victory. The victory was NAU's first against Montana since 2014.

The Lumberjacks finished the regular season in a tie for fifth-place in the Big Sky. As was the case all season, no lead was safe against NAU. The Lumberjacks battled back from a 15-point halftime deficit before seeing their season end in the first round against Idaho State. NAU led by their three all-conference honorees in their season finale. Brooks DeBisschop scored 17 points, while Bernie Andre and Cameron Shelton added 16 and 13 respectively. DeBisschop was also named CoSIDA First Team Academic All-American. He is the first Lumberjack men's basketball player to be a First Team Academic All-American.

== Previous season ==
The Lumberjacks finished the 2018–19 season 10–21 overall, 8–12 in Big Sky play to finish in a tie for 8th place. In the Big Sky Conference tournament, they lost to Sacramento State in the first round.

== Roster ==
2019–20 Northern Arizona Lumberjacks men's basketball team
Players
Coaches

Pos.	#	Name	Height	Weight	Year	Previous school	Hometown
G	0	Cameron Satterwhite	6 ft 4 in (1.93 m)	172 lb (78 kg)	Jr	Gilbert Christian; Loyola–Chicago	Gilbert, Arizona
F	2	Ajang Aguek	6 ft 8 in (2.03 m)	180 lb (82 kg)	Fr	Ironwood	Glendale, Arizona
G	3	David Cummard	6 ft 0 in (1.83 m)	200 lb (91 kg)	RS So	Mesa	Mesa, Arizona
G	5	Charles Burns	6 ft 0 in (1.83 m)	150 lb (68 kg)	Fr	Loyola Sacred Heart	Lolo, Montana
F	10	Bernie Andre	6 ft 6 in (1.98 m)	210 lb (95 kg)	Jr	Norland; Wallace State	North Miami Beach, Florida
F	11	Jackson Larsen	6 ft 7 in (2.01 m)	192 lb (87 kg)	Fr	Christian	El Cajon, California
F	13	Keith Haymon	6 ft 7 in (2.01 m)	195 lb (88 kg)	RS Fr	Cypress Ranch	Cypress, Texas
G	14	Isaiah Lewis	6 ft 6 in (1.98 m)	195 lb (88 kg)	Fr	Lone Star	Little Elm, Texas
F	15	Nik Mains	6 ft 8 in (2.03 m)	215 lb (98 kg)	RS So	Pinnacle	Scottsdale, Arizona
G	20	Cameron Shelton	6 ft 2 in (1.88 m)	180 lb (82 kg)	So	Damien	Chino, California
G	21	Luke Avdalovic	6 ft 5 in (1.96 m)	195 lb (88 kg)	RS So	Vista del Lago	Folsom, California
F	22	Brooks DeBisschop	6 ft 9 in (2.06 m)	245 lb (111 kg)	Sr	West Linn	West Linn, Oregon
G/F	32	Chris Bowling	6 ft 7 in (2.01 m)	195 lb (88 kg)	Sr	Gilbert	Gilbert, Arizona
F	33	Adrease Jackson	6 ft 8 in (2.03 m)	220 lb (100 kg)	Jr	Santa Margarita Catholic; Dartmouth	Ladera Ranch, California
G	34	Ted McCree	6 ft 5 in (1.96 m)	171 lb (78 kg)	Sr	Orchard Lake St. Mary's; Gillette College	Detroit, Michigan

Head coach

- Shane Burcar

Assistant coach(es)

- Gaellan Bewernick (Northern Arizona)
- Tyler Ojanen (Cal Baptist)
- Justin McLean (Arizona State)

Legend

- (C) Team captain
- (S) Suspended
- (I) Ineligible
- (W) Walk-on
- Injured
- Current redshirt

Roster
Last update: January 11, 2020

== Schedule and results ==
Date time, TV	Rank^{#}	Opponent^{#}	Result	Record	Site (attendance) city, state
Exhibition
October 28, 2019*; 6:30 pm		Embry–Riddle Aeronautical	W 109–75		Rolle Activity Center (220); Flagstaff, AZ
Non-conference regular season
November 6, 2019*; 7:00 pm, P12N		at No. 21 Arizona	L 52–91	0–1	McKale Center (12,960); Tucson, AZ
November 15, 2019*; 6:00 pm, Pluto TV		SAGU American Indian	W 105–32	1–1	Rolle Activity Center (821); Flagstaff, AZ
November 20, 2019*; 6:00 pm, Pluto TV		Benedictine Mesa	W 93–56	2–1	Rolle Activity Center (303); Flagstaff, AZ
November 30, 2019*; 12:00 pm, Pluto TV		South Dakota	W 76–72	3–1	Rolle Activity Center (353); Flagstaff, AZ
December 4, 2019*; 6:00 pm, Pluto TV		UC Davis	L 66–85	3–2	Rolle Activity Center (434); Flagstaff, AZ
December 8, 2019*; 3:00 pm, Pluto TV		Omaha	W 73–65	4–2	Findlay Toyota Center (303); Prescott Valley, AZ
December 14, 2019*; 7:30 pm, WAC DN		at Utah Valley	W 79–73	5–2	UCCU Center (1,582); Orem, UT
December 19, 2019*; 8:00 pm		at UC Riverside	W 63–56	6–2	SRC Arena (400); Riverside, CA
December 21, 2019*; 2:00 pm, WCC Network		at Pepperdine	L 73–75	6–3	Firestone Fieldhouse (801); Malibu, CA
Big Sky regular season
December 28, 2019; 7:00 pm, Pluto TV		at Montana	L 72–79	6–4 (0–1)	Dahlberg Arena (4,017); Missoula, MT
December 30, 2019; 7:00 pm, Pluto TV/Eleven		at Montana State	L 61–63	6–5 (0–2)	Brick Breeden Fieldhouse (3,196); Bozeman, MT
January 4, 2020; 4:00 pm, Pluto TV		Weber State	W 72–64	7–5 (1–2)	Walkup Skydome (263); Flagstaff, AZ
January 9, 2020; 8:00 pm, Pluto TV		at Sacramento State	L 57–64	7–6 (1–3)	Hornets Nest (696); Sacramento, CA
January 11, 2020; 4:00 pm, Pluto TV		Idaho State	L 67–71	7–7 (1–4)	Walkup Skydome (577); Flagstaff, AZ
January 16, 2020; 7:00 pm, Pluto TV/Eleven		at Southern Utah	W 75–72	8–7 (2–4)	America First Event Center (3,346); Cedar City, UT
January 18, 2020; 2:00 pm, Pluto TV		at Northern Colorado	W 64–58	9–7 (3–4)	Bank of Colorado Arena (1,525); Greeley, CO
January 25, 2020; 4:00 pm, Pluto TV		Portland State	W 84–82	10–7 (4–4)	Walkup Skydome (1,624); Flagstaff, AZ
January 27, 2020; 6:00 pm, Pluto TV		Sacramento State	W 69–54	11–7 (5–4)	Walkup Skydome (605); Flagstaff, AZ
February 1, 2020; 2:00 pm, Pluto TV		Idaho	W 77–72	12–7 (6–4)	Rolle Activity Center (1,039); Flagstaff, AZ
February 3, 2020; 6:00 pm, Pluto TV		Eastern Washington	L 66–77	12–8 (6–5)	Walkup Skydome (498); Flagstaff, AZ
February 6, 2020; 7:00 pm, Pluto TV		at Idaho State	W 88–87 ^{OT}	13–8 (7–5)	Reed Gym (1,267); Pocatello, ID
February 8, 2020; 7:00 pm, Pluto TV		at Weber State	L 70–76	13–9 (7–6)	Dee Events Center (5,133); Ogden, UT
February 13, 2020; 6:00 pm, Pluto TV		Northern Colorado	L 54–84	13–10 (7–7)	Walkup Skydome (635); Flagstaff, AZ
February 15, 2020; 4:00 pm, Pluto TV		Southern Utah	W 82–69	14–10 (8–7)	Walkup Skydome (678); Flagstaff, AZ
February 20, 2020; 6:30 pm, Pluto TV		at Idaho	W 78–61	15–10 (9–7)	Cowan Spectrum (1,201); Moscow, ID
February 22, 2020; 3:00 pm, Pluto TV		at Eastern Washington	L 70–80	15–11 (9–8)	Reese Court (1,577); Cheney, WA
February 27, 2020; 6:00 pm, Pluto TV/NAU-TV		Montana	W 57–56	16–11 (10–8)	Walkup Skydome (918); Flagstaff, AZ
February 29, 2020; 4:00 pm, Pluto TV		Montana State	L 57–63	16–12 (10–9)	Walkup Skydome (1,164); Flagstaff, AZ
March 5, 2020; 8:00 pm, Pluto TV		at Portland State	L 66–80	16–13 (10–10)	Viking Pavilion (1,205); Portland, OR
Big Sky tournament
March 11, 2020; 2:30 pm, Pluto TV	(6)	vs. (11) Idaho State; First round	L 62–64	16–14	CenturyLink Arena (2,503); Boise, ID
*Non-conference game. ^{#}Rankings from AP Poll. (#) Tournament seedings in parentheses. All times are in Mountain.
