= 2019–20 Eastern Washington Eagles men's basketball team =

American college basketball season

2019–20 Eastern Washington Eagles men's basketball

Big Sky regular season champions
- Conference: Big Sky Conference
- Record: 23–8 (16–4 Big Sky)
- Head coach: Shantay Legans (3rd season)
- Associate head coach: Nick Booker
- Assistant coaches: David Riley; Bobby Suarez
- Home arena: Reese Court

2019–20 Big Sky men's basketball standings
	Conf.				Overall
Team	W		L	PCT	W		L	PCT
Eastern Washington	16	–	4	.800	23	–	8	.742
Northern Colorado	15	–	5	.750	22	–	9	.710
Montana	14	–	6	.700	18	–	13	.581
Portland State	12	–	8	.600	18	–	14	.563
Northern Arizona	10	–	10	.500	16	–	14	.533
Montana State	10	–	10	.500	16	–	15	.516
Southern Utah	9	–	11	.450	17	–	15	.531
Sacramento State	8	–	12	.400	16	–	14	.533
Weber State	8	–	12	.400	12	–	20	.375
Idaho State	4	–	16	.200	8	–	22	.267
Idaho	4	–	16	.200	8	–	24	.250
Note: The conference tournament was canceled prior to the quarterfinals due to the COVID-19 pandemic.

The 2019–20 Eastern Washington Eagles men's basketball team represented Eastern Washington University during the 2019–20 NCAA Division I men's basketball season. Led by third-year head coach Shantay Legans, the Eagles were members of the Big Sky Conference and played their home games on campus at Reese Court in Cheney, Washington. They finished the regular season at 23–8 (16–4 in Big Sky, first).

As the top seed in the conference tournament, they were slated to play ninth-seeded Sacramento State in the quarterfinals on Thursday, March 12, but the tournament was cancelled due to the COVID-19 pandemic, along with the rest of the NCAA postseason.

== Previous season ==
The Eagles finished the 2018–19 season at 16–18 (12–8 in Big Sky, third). In the conference tournament, EWU defeated Montana State and Southern Utah to advance to the championship game, where they lost to Montana.

== Roster ==
2019–20 Eastern Washington Eagles men's basketball team
Players
Coaches

Pos.	#	Name	Height	Weight	Year	Previous school	Hometown
G	0	Tyler Kidd (W)	5 ft 9 in (1.75 m)	180 lb (82 kg)	RS Sr	O'Dea HS; Skagit Valley College	Seattle, Washington
G	1	Austin Fadal	6 ft 4 in (1.93 m)	175 lb (79 kg)	So	Hillcrest Prep	San Ramon, California
G/F	2	Steele Venters	6 ft 7 in (2.01 m)	175 lb (79 kg)	Fr	Ellensburg HS	Ellensburg, Washington
G	5	Casson Rouse (W)	6 ft 2 in (1.88 m)	180 lb (82 kg)	RS Fr	Timberline HS	Lacey, Washington
G	10	Jacob Davison	6 ft 4 in (1.93 m)	175 lb (79 kg)	RS Jr	Cantwell-Sacred Heart HS	Long Beach, California
G	11	Jack Perry	6 ft 2 in (1.88 m)	175 lb (79 kg)	Jr	Camberwell Grammar School	Melbourne, Australia
G	12	Steven Beo	6 ft 3 in (1.91 m)	180 lb (82 kg)	RS Jr	Richland HS; BYU	Richland, Washington
F	14	Mason Peatling	6 ft 8 in (2.03 m)	220 lb (100 kg)	Sr	Beaconhills College HS	Melbourne, Australia
G/F	15	Tyler Robertson	6 ft 6 in (1.98 m)	200 lb (91 kg)	Fr	Box Hill Senior Secondary	Melbourne, Australia
F	21	Adriel Linares	6 ft 9 in (2.06 m)	195 lb (88 kg)	RS Fr	Sunnybrook Christian HS	San Antonio, Texas
G	22	Elijah Jackson	6 ft 4 in (1.93 m)	190 lb (86 kg)	So	Chief Sealth HS	West Seattle, Washington
F	23	Jordan Veening (W)	6 ft 6 in (1.98 m)	205 lb (93 kg)	RS Fr	Nooksack Valley HS	Sumas, Washington
G/F	24	Kim Aiken Jr.	6 ft 7 in (2.01 m)	215 lb (98 kg)	RS Fr	East Valley HS	Redlands, California
G	25	Michael Meadows	6 ft 2 in (1.88 m)	175 lb (79 kg)	RS Fr	Campbell Hall HS	Hollywood, California
G/F	33	Jacob Groves	6 ft 7 in (2.01 m)	185 lb (84 kg)	Fr	Shadle Park HS	Spokane, Washington
F	35	Tanner Groves	6 ft 9 in (2.06 m)	235 lb (107 kg)	RS So	Shadle Park HS	Spokane, Washington
F	44	Abdullahi Mohamed	6 ft 8 in (2.03 m)	190 lb (86 kg)	Fr	West Seattle HS	Seattle, Washington
G	55	Ellis Magnuson	6 ft 2 in (1.88 m)	190 lb (86 kg)	Fr	Borah HS	Boise, Idaho

Head coach

- Shantay Legans (Fresno State)

Assistant coach(es)

- Nick Booker (Davidson)
- David Riley (Whitworth)
- Bobby Suarez (Florida Gulf Coast)

Legend

- (C) Team captain
- (S) Suspended
- (I) Ineligible
- (W) Walk-on
- Injured
- Current redshirt

Roster
Last update: January 9, 2020

== Schedule and results ==
Date time, TV	Rank^{#}	Opponent^{#}	Result	Record	Site (attendance) city, state
Non-conference regular season
Nov 5, 2019*; 6:00 pm		at Portland Bible	W 107–25	1–0	Reese Court (1,050); Cheney, WA
Nov 9, 2019*; 7:00 pm, RTNW		at Seattle	W 74–66	2–0	Redhawk Center (999); Seattle, WA
Nov 13, 2019*; 5:00 pm, FSMW		at Green Bay; Gotham Classic	L 60–82	2–1	Chaifetz Arena (5,023); St. Louis, MO
Nov 20, 2019*; 4:00 pm, ACCN		at Boston College; Gotham Classic	L 68–72	2–2	Conte Forum (4,133); Chestnut Hill, MA
Nov 23, 2019*; 11:00 am, ESPN+		at High Point; Gotham Classic	W 83–59	3–2	Millis Center (874); High Point, NC
Nov 26, 2019*; 6:00 pm		Belmont; Gotham Classic	W 87–82	4–2	Reese Court (1,305); Cheney, WA
Dec 4, 2019*; 7:00 pm, P12N		at No. 22 Washington	L 80–90	4–3	Alaska Airlines Arena (7,419); Seattle, WA
Dec 8, 2019*; 3:30 pm		North Dakota; Big Sky/Summit Challenge	W 98–82	5–3	Reese Court (1,353); Cheney, WA
Dec 13, 2019*; 6:00 pm		Multnomah	W 146–89	6–3	Reese Court (1,200); Cheney, WA
Dec 17, 2019*; 6:00 pm		Omaha; Big Sky/Summit Challenge	W 97–56	7–3	Reese Court (1,054); Cheney, WA
Dec 21, 2019*; 2:00 pm, RTNW		at No. 2 Gonzaga	L 77–112	7–4	McCarthey Athletic Center (6,000); Spokane, WA
Big Sky regular season
Dec 28, 2019; 1:00 pm		at Weber State	W 79–77	8–4 (1–0)	Dee Events Center (4,423); Ogden, UT
Dec 30, 2019; 6:00 pm		at Idaho State	L 69–75	8–5 (1–1)	Reed Gym (1,437); Pocatello, ID
Jan 4, 2020; 2:00 pm		Portland State	W 71–69	9–5 (2–1)	Reese Court (1,321); Cheney, WA
Jan 9, 2020; 6:00 pm, SWX		Montana	L 63–90	9–6 (2–2)	Reese Court (1,837); Cheney, WA
Jan 16, 2020; 7:30 pm		at Idaho	W 78–75	10–6 (3–2)	Cowan Spectrum (1,110); Moscow, ID
Jan 18, 2020; 3:00 pm		at Montana State	W 71–58	11–6 (4–2)	Brick Breeden Fieldhouse (3,713); Bozeman, MT
Jan 25, 2020; 2:00 pm		Southern Utah	W 81–78 ^{OT}	12–6 (5–2)	Reese Court (1,561); Cheney, WA
Jan 27, 2020; 6:00 pm, SWX		Northern Colorado	W 89–84 ^{OT}	13–6 (6–2)	Reese Court (1,481); Cheney, WA
Feb 1, 2020; 7:00 pm		at Sacramento State	W 59–54	14–6 (7–2)	Hornets Nest (828); Sacramento, CA
Feb 3, 2020; 5:00 pm		at Northern Arizona	W 77–66	15–6 (8–2)	Walkup Skydome (498); Flagstaff, AZ
Feb 6, 2020; 6:00 pm		at Montana	L 82–92	15–7 (8–3)	Dahlberg Arena (3,879); Missoula, MT
Feb 8, 2020; 2:00 pm, SWX		Montana State	W 74–49	16–7 (9–3)	Reese Court (1,529); Cheney, WA
Feb 13, 2020; 7:45 pm, SWX		Idaho	L 71–74	16–8 (9–4)	Reese Court (1,576); Cheney, WA
Feb 15, 2020; 7:00 pm, Eleven		at Portland State	W 89–81	17–8 (10–4)	Viking Pavilion (1,424); Portland, OR
Feb 20, 2020; 6:00 pm		Sacramento State	W 77–76	18–8 (11–4)	Reese Court (1,823); Cheney, WA
Feb 22, 2020; 2:00 pm, SWX		Northern Arizona	W 80–70	19–8 (12–4)	Reese Court (1,577); Cheney, WA
Feb 27, 2020; 6:00 pm		at Southern Utah	W 69–51	20–8 (13–4)	America First Event Center (2,368); Cedar City, UT
Feb 29, 2020; 6:00 pm		at Northern Colorado	W 68–64	21–8 (14–4)	Bank of Colorado Arena (2,582); Greeley, CO
Mar 5, 2020; 6:00 pm		Idaho State	W 100–75	22–8 (15–4)	Reese Court (1,531); Cheney, WA
Mar 7, 2020; 2:00 pm, Eleven		Weber State	W 78–69	23–8 (16–4)	Reese Court (1,922); Cheney, WA
Big Sky tournament
Mar 12, 2020; 11:00 am, Pluto TV/Eleven	(1)	vs. (9) Sacramento State; Quarterfinals	Canceled due to the COVID-19 pandemic		CenturyLink Arena; Boise, ID
*Non-conference game. (#) Tournament seedings in parentheses. All times are in Pacific Time.
