= 2019–20 Portland State Vikings men's basketball team =

American college basketball season

2019–20 Portland State Vikings men's basketball
- Conference: Big Sky Conference
- Record: 18–14 (12–8 Big Sky)
- Head coach: Barret Peery (3rd season)
- Associate head coach: Jase Coburn
- Assistant coaches: Chris Skinkis; CJ Killin
- Home arena: Viking Pavilion

2019–20 Big Sky men's basketball standings
	Conf.				Overall
Team	W		L	PCT	W		L	PCT
Eastern Washington	16	–	4	.800	23	–	8	.742
Northern Colorado	15	–	5	.750	22	–	9	.710
Montana	14	–	6	.700	18	–	13	.581
Portland State	12	–	8	.600	18	–	14	.563
Northern Arizona	10	–	10	.500	16	–	14	.533
Montana State	10	–	10	.500	16	–	15	.516
Southern Utah	9	–	11	.450	17	–	15	.531
Sacramento State	8	–	12	.400	16	–	14	.533
Weber State	8	–	12	.400	12	–	20	.375
Idaho State	4	–	16	.200	8	–	22	.267
Idaho	4	–	16	.200	8	–	24	.250
Note: The conference tournament was canceled prior to the quarterfinals due to the COVID-19 pandemic.

The 2019–20 Portland State Vikings men's basketball team represented Portland State University in the 2019–20 NCAA Division I men's basketball season. The Vikings, led by third-year head coach Barret Peery, played their home games at Viking Pavilion in Portland, Oregon as members of the Big Sky Conference.

The Vikings finished the season 18–14, 12–8 Big Sky play, to finish in fourth place. Due to the ongoing coronavirus pandemic, all postseason tournaments were canceled, including the Big Sky tournament.

== Previous season ==
The Vikings finished the 2018–19 season 16–16 overall, 11–9 in Big Sky play, to finish in a three-way tie for fourth place. In the Big Sky Conference tournament, they lost to Weber State in the quarterfinals.

== Roster ==
2019–20 Portland State Vikings men's basketball team
Players
Coaches

Pos.	#	Name	Height	Weight	Year	Previous school	Hometown
C	0	Sal Nuhu	6 ft 8 in (2.03 m)	215 lb (98 kg)	Sr	Hutchinson CC	The Bronx, NY
G	1	Kimani Binder	6 ft 3 in (1.91 m)	185 lb (84 kg)	Jr	Indian River State College	Orlando, FL
G/F	2	Markus Golder	6 ft 6 in (1.98 m)	195 lb (88 kg)	Sr	Valparaiso	Clackamas, OR
F	3	Rashaad Goolsby	6 ft 7 in (2.01 m)	200 lb (91 kg)	Sr	Phoenix College	Phoenix, AZ
G	5	Kyle Greeley	6 ft 5 in (1.96 m)	185 lb (84 kg)	Fr	West Salem	Salem, OR
G	10	Matt Hauser	6 ft 2 in (1.88 m)	180 lb (82 kg)	Sr	Santa Clara	Thousand Oaks, CA
G	11	Holland Woods	6 ft 1 in (1.85 m)	180 lb (82 kg)	Jr	Apollo	Phoenix, AZ
F	12	Trey Wood	6 ft 9 in (2.06 m)	210 lb (95 kg)	Fr	Anthem Prep	Anthem, AZ
G	13	Jaden Nielsen-Skinner	5 ft 9 in (1.75 m)	165 lb (75 kg)	Fr	South Salem	Salem, OR
G	14	Lamar Hamrick	6 ft 4 in (1.93 m)	190 lb (86 kg)	Sr	Detroit Mercy	New Castle, DE
G	15	Ian Burke	6 ft 5 in (1.96 m)	185 lb (84 kg)	So	Seattle	Phoenix, AZ
C	21	Daniel Giannosa	6 ft 10 in (2.08 m)	280 lb (127 kg)	Jr	Big Valley Christian	Modesto, CA
F	22	Alonzo Walker	6 ft 6 in (1.98 m)	210 lb (95 kg)	Sr	Idaho State	Toronto, ON
G	30	Chris Whitaker	6 ft 3 in (1.91 m)	200 lb (91 kg)	So	Cochise College	Harrisburg, PA

Head coach

- Barret Peery (Southern Utah)

Assistant coach(es)

- Jase Coburn (Arizona State)
- Chris Skinkis (UW–Parkside)
- CJ Killin (Nebraska–Kearney)

Legend

- (C) Team captain
- (S) Suspended
- (I) Ineligible
- (W) Walk-on
- Injured
- Current redshirt

Roster
Last update: January 11, 2020

== Schedule and results ==
Date time, TV	Rank^{#}	Opponent^{#}	Result	Record	Site (attendance) city, state
Exhibition
October 30, 2019*; 7:35 p.m.		Evergreen State	W 103–46		Viking Pavilion (501); Portland, OR
Non-conference regular season
November 5, 2019*; 7:35 p.m.		Puget Sound	W 94–69	1–0	Viking Pavilion (856); Portland, OR
November 9, 2019*; 11:00 a.m., BTN+		at Indiana	L 74–85	1–1	Simon Skjodt Assembly Hall (17,222); Bloomington, IN
November 15, 2019*; 9:00 p.m., Spectrum Sports Hawaii		at Hawaii	L 75–83	1–2	Stan Sheriff Center (5,014); Honolulu, HI
November 20, 2019*; 7:05 p.m.		Portland	L 75–82	1–3	Viking Pavilion (2,027); Portland, OR
November 23, 2019*; 7:00 p.m.		at San Jose State; Las Vegas Holiday Classic	W 91–76	2–3	Provident Credit Union Event Center (1,512); San Jose, CA
November 26, 2019*; 12:00 p.m.		vs. Grambling State; Las Vegas Holiday Classic	W 84–74	3–3	The Thunderdome (217); Santa Barbara, CA
November 27, 2019*; 7:00 p.m.		at UC Santa Barbara; Las Vegas Holiday Classic	L 70–81	3–4	The Thunderdome (1,077); Santa Barbara, CA
December 1, 2019*; 3:00 p.m., P12N		at Oregon State; Las Vegas Holiday Classic	L 76–81	3–5	Gill Coliseum (3,765); Corvallis, OR
December 6, 2019*; 7:35 p.m.		Cal State Northridge	W 73–67	4–5	Viking Pavilion (849); Portland, OR
December 12, 2019*; 7:05 p.m.		Portland Bible	W 101–48	5–5	Viking Pavilion (655); Portland, OR
December 17, 2019*; 7:00 p.m., WCC		at Pepperdine	L 71–77	5–6	Firestone Fieldhouse (745); Malibu, CA
December 19, 2019*; 7:00 p.m.		at Loyola Marymount	W 76–66	6–6	Gersten Pavilion (617); Los Angeles, CA
Big Sky regular season
December 28, 2019; 2:05 p.m.		Northern Colorado	W 69–65	7–6 (1–0)	Viking Pavilion (902); Portland, OR
December 30, 2019; 7:05 p.m.		Southern Utah	L 81–83	7–7 (1–1)	Viking Pavilion (755); Portland, OR
January 2, 2020; 6:30 p.m.		at Idaho	L 61–72	7–8 (1–2)	Cowan Spectrum (831); Moscow, ID
January 4, 2020; 2:05 p.m.		at Eastern Washington	L 69–71	7–9 (1–3)	Reese Court (1,321); Cheney, WA
January 11, 2020; 5:00 p.m., SWX Montana		at Montana State	W 77–76	8–9 (2–3)	Brick Breeden Fieldhouse (3,071); Bozeman, MT
January 13, 2020; 6:00 p.m., SWX Montana		at Montana	L 70–85	8–10 (2–4)	Dahlberg Arena (3,252); Missoula, MT
January 18, 2020; 7:05 p.m.		Idaho State	W 82–76	9–10 (3–4)	Viking Pavilion (1,105); Portland, OR
January 20, 2020; 7:05 p.m.		Weber State	W 92–76	10–10 (4–4)	Viking Pavilion (875); Portland, OR
January 23, 2020; 7:05 p.m.		at Sacramento State	L 55–66	10–11 (4–5)	Hornets Nest (1,014); Sacramento, CA
January 25, 2020; 3:00 p.m.		at Northern Arizona	L 82–84	10–12 (4–6)	Walkup Skydome (1,624); Flagstaff, AZ
January 30, 2020; 7:05 p.m., Eleven		Montana	W 88–81	11–12 (5–6)	Viking Pavilion (1,704); Portland, OR
February 8, 2020; 1:00 p.m.		at Southern Utah	L 57–85	11–13 (5–7)	America First Event Center (2,085); Cedar City, UT
February 10, 2020; 6:00 p.m.		at Northern Colorado	W 83–71	12–13 (6–7)	Bank of Colorado Arena (1,158); Greeley, CO
February 15, 2020; 7:05 p.m., Eleven		Eastern Washington	L 81–89	12–14 (6–8)	Viking Pavilion (1,424); Portland, OR
February 17, 2020; 7:05 p.m.		Idaho	W 90–69	13–14 (7–8)	Viking Pavilion (1,043); Portland, OR
February 20, 2020; 7:05 p.m., Eleven		Montana State	W 87–77	14–14 (8–8)	Viking Pavilion (1,242); Portland, OR
February 27, 2020; 6:00 p.m.		at Idaho State	W 89–76	15–14 (9–8)	Reed Gym (1,396); Pocatello, ID
February 29, 2020; 6:00 p.m.		at Weber State	W 89–83	16–14 (10–8)	Dee Events Center (5,422); Ogden, UT
March 5, 2020; 7:05 p.m.		Northern Arizona	W 80–66	17–14 (11–8)	Viking Pavilion (1,205); Portland, OR
March 7, 2020; 7:05 p.m.		Sacramento State	W 76–72	18–14 (12–8)	Viking Pavilion; Portland, OR
Big Sky tournament
March 12, 2020; 1:30 p.m., Pluto TV/Eleven Sports	(4)	vs. (5) Montana State; Quarterfinals	Canceled due to the COVID-19 pandemic		CenturyLink Arena; Boise, ID
*Non-conference game. ^{#}Rankings from AP poll. (#) Tournament seedings in parentheses. All times are in Pacific.
