= 2020 Big Sky Conference men's basketball tournament =

- Classification: Division I
- Season: 2019–20
- Teams: 11
- Site: CenturyLink Arena; Boise, Idaho
- Champions: Tournament not completed
- Television: Pluto TV, Eleven Sports, ESPNU

2019–20 Big Sky men's basketball standings
	Conf.				Overall
Team	W		L	PCT	W		L	PCT
Eastern Washington	16	–	4	.800	23	–	8	.742
Northern Colorado	15	–	5	.750	22	–	9	.710
Montana	14	–	6	.700	18	–	13	.581
Portland State	12	–	8	.600	18	–	14	.563
Northern Arizona	10	–	10	.500	16	–	14	.533
Montana State	10	–	10	.500	16	–	15	.516
Southern Utah	9	–	11	.450	17	–	15	.531
Sacramento State	8	–	12	.400	16	–	14	.533
Weber State	8	–	12	.400	12	–	20	.375
Idaho State	4	–	16	.200	8	–	22	.267
Idaho	4	–	16	.200	8	–	24	.250
Note: The conference tournament was canceled prior to the quarterfinals due to the COVID-19 pandemic.

The 2020 Big Sky Conference men's basketball tournament was the 45th postseason tournament for the Big Sky Conference, scheduled for March 11–14 at CenturyLink Arena in Boise, Idaho. The champion would have earned the Big Sky's berth in the 68-team NCAA tournament.

Due to the COVID-19 pandemic, play was suspended prior to the quarterfinals on Thursday, March 12, and not completed; the NCAA tournament was soon cancelled.

== Seeds ==
All eleven teams participated and were seeded by conference record, with a tiebreaker system; the top five teams received a first-round bye.

Seed	School	Conf	Tiebreaker(s)
1	Eastern Washington	16–4	
2	Northern Colorado	15–5	
3	Montana	14–6	
4	Portland State	12–8	
5	Montana State	10–10	2–0 vs Northern Arizona
6	Northern Arizona	10–10	0–2 vs Montana State
7	Southern Utah	9–11	
8	Weber State	8–12	1–1 vs Montana
9	Sacramento State	8–12	0–2 vs Montana
10	Idaho	4–16	1–1 vs Portland State
11	Idaho State	4–16	0–2 vs Portland State

== Schedule ==
Game	Time	Matchup	Score	Television	Attendance
First round – Wednesday, March 11
1	9:30 am	No. 8 Weber State vs. No. 9 Sacramento State	54–62	Pluto TV	2,503
2	12:00 pm	No. 7 Southern Utah vs. No. 10 Idaho	75–69	Pluto TV	2,503
3	2:30 pm	No. 6 Northern Arizona vs. No. 11 Idaho State	62–64	Pluto TV	2,503
Quarterfinals – Thursday, March 12
4	12:00 pm	No. 1 Eastern Washington vs. No. 9 Sacramento State	cancelled	Pluto TV/ Eleven Sports	—N/a
5	2:30 pm	No. 4 Portland State vs No. 5 Montana State	cancelled	Pluto TV/ Eleven Sports	—N/a
6	5:30 pm	No. 2 Northern Colorado vs. No. 7 Southern Utah	cancelled	Pluto TV/ Eleven Sports	—N/a
7	8:00 pm	No. 3 Montana vs. No. 11 Idaho State	cancelled	Pluto TV/ Eleven Sports	—N/a
Semifinals – Friday, March 13
8	5:30 pm	Game 4 Winner vs. Game 5 Winner	cancelled	Eleven Sports	—N/a
9	8:00 pm	Game 6 Winner vs. Game 7 Winner	cancelled	Eleven Sports	—N/a
Championship – Saturday, March 14
10	6:00 pm	Game 8 Winner vs. Game 9 Winner	cancelled	ESPNU	—N/a
Game times in MT. Rankings denote tournament seeding.

== Bracket ==
First round Wednesday, March 11; Pluto TV
8	Weber State	54
9	Sacramento State	62
7	Southern Utah	75
10	Idaho	69
6	Northern Arizona	62
11	Idaho State	64

Quarterfinals; Thursday, March 12; Pluto TV/Eleven Sports
1	Eastern Washington
9	Sacramento State
4	Portland State
5	Montana State
2	Northern Colorado
7	Southern Utah
3	Montana
11	Idaho State

Semifinals; Friday, March 13; Eleven Sports

Championship; Saturday, March 14; ESPNU

* denotes overtime period

== Game summaries ==
=== First round ===
March 11
11:30 AM
