= 2019–20 Idaho State Bengals men's basketball team =

American college basketball season

2019–20 Idaho State Bengals men's basketball
- Conference: Big Sky Conference
- Record: 8–22 (4–16 Big Sky)
- Head coach: Ryan Looney (1st season)
- Assistant coaches: Jared Phay; Joe White; Chris McMillian
- Home arena: Reed Gym

2019–20 Big Sky men's basketball standings
	Conf.				Overall
Team	W		L	PCT	W		L	PCT
Eastern Washington	16	–	4	.800	23	–	8	.742
Northern Colorado	15	–	5	.750	22	–	9	.710
Montana	14	–	6	.700	18	–	13	.581
Portland State	12	–	8	.600	18	–	14	.563
Northern Arizona	10	–	10	.500	16	–	14	.533
Montana State	10	–	10	.500	16	–	15	.516
Southern Utah	9	–	11	.450	17	–	15	.531
Sacramento State	8	–	12	.400	16	–	14	.533
Weber State	8	–	12	.400	12	–	20	.375
Idaho State	4	–	16	.200	8	–	22	.267
Idaho	4	–	16	.200	8	–	24	.250
Note: The conference tournament was canceled prior to the quarterfinals due to the COVID-19 pandemic.

The 2019–20 Idaho State Bengals men's basketball team represented Idaho State University during the 2019–20 NCAA Division I men's basketball season. The Bengals, led by first-year head coach Ryan Looney, played their home games at Reed Gym in Pocatello, Idaho as members of the Big Sky Conference.

== Previous season ==
The Bengals finished the 2018–19 season 11–19, 7–13 in Big Sky play to finish in 11th place. They lost in the first round of the Big Sky tournament to Southern Utah.

On March 26, Idaho State decided to not renew the contract of head coach Bill Evans. He finished at Idaho State with a seven-year record of 70–141.

== Roster ==
2019–20 Idaho State Bengals men's basketball team
Players
Coaches

Pos.	#	Name	Height	Weight	Year	Previous school	Hometown
G	1	Austin Smellie	6 ft 5 in (1.96 m)	185 lb (84 kg)	So	Preston HS	Preston, ID
G	2	Tarik Cool	6 ft 4 in (1.93 m)	180 lb (82 kg)	Jr	Desert Vista HS; Lane CC	Chandler, AZ
F	3	Malik Porter	6 ft 5 in (1.96 m)	205 lb (93 kg)	Jr	Cesar Chavez HS; Southern Idaho	Phoenix, AZ
G	4	Chidi Udengwu	6 ft 7 in (2.01 m)	200 lb (91 kg)	Sr	Diamond Ranch HS; San Bernardino Valley College	Diamond Bar, CA
F	5	Chier Maker	6 ft 8 in (2.03 m)	205 lb (93 kg)	Sr	Newington College; Palm Beach State	Sydney, Australia
G	10	Lyle Sutton (W)	6 ft 2 in (1.88 m)	185 lb (84 kg)	RS Jr	Madison HS	Rexburg, ID
G	11	Landon Bowman (W)	6 ft 0 in (1.83 m)	165 lb (75 kg)	Fr	Watersprings HS	Castro, Chile
G	12	Nico Aguirre	6 ft 0 in (1.83 m)	175 lb (79 kg)	So	Southern Idaho	Idaho Falls, ID
F	13	Daxton Carr	6 ft 7 in (2.01 m)	210 lb (95 kg)	So	Highland HS; Cal Poly	Pocatello, ID
F	15	Coreyoun Rushin	6 ft 6 in (1.98 m)	200 lb (91 kg)	RS So	Westinghouse Prep; Southern Idaho	Chicago, IL
G	20	Balint Moscan	6 ft 3 in (1.91 m)	190 lb (86 kg)	Sr	Kempelen Farkas Grammar School	Budapest, Hungary
G	21	Jared Stutzman	6 ft 6 in (1.98 m)	200 lb (91 kg)	Sr	Bonneville; Utah Valley	Idaho Falls, ID
G	22	Jaxon Edelmayer	6 ft 2 in (1.88 m)	190 lb (86 kg)	So	Madison HS; Southern Idaho	Rexburg, ID
G	23	Houston Wahlen (W)	6 ft 2 in (1.88 m)	175 lb (79 kg)	RS Jr	Aberdeen HS	Aberdeen, ID
G	24	Nick Huston	6 ft 4 in (1.93 m)	205 lb (93 kg)	Jr	Rigby HS; Snow College	Rigby, ID
F	25	Brayden Parker	6 ft 8 in (2.03 m)	255 lb (116 kg)	So	Preston HS; Southern Idaho	Preston, ID
F	35	Will Reichelt	6 ft 7 in (2.01 m)	240 lb (109 kg)	Sr	Pocatello HS	Pocatello, ID

Head coach

- Ryan Looney (Eastern Oregon)

Assistant coach(es)

- Tim Walsh (North Idaho)
- Kyle Taylor (Southern Oregon)
- C.J. Killin (Wyoming)

Legend

- (C) Team captain
- (S) Suspended
- (I) Ineligible
- (W) Walk-on
- Injured
- Current redshirt

Roster
Last update: January 10, 2020

== Schedule and results ==
Date time, TV	Rank^{#}	Opponent^{#}	Result	Record	Site (attendance) city, state
Exhibition
Oct 23, 2019*; 7:00 pm		Eastern Oregon	W 78–53		Reed Gym; Pocatello, ID
Oct 29, 2019*; 7:00 pm		Montana Tech	W 62–52		Reed Gym; Pocatello, ID
Non-conference regular season
Nov 5, 2019*; 7:00 pm		at Wyoming	L 40–54	0–1	Arena-Auditorium (3,010); Laramie, WY
Nov 7, 2019*; 7:00 pm		at Air Force	W 89–79	1–1	Clune Arena (1,633); Colorado Springs, CO
Nov 14, 2019*; 7:00 pm		Montana–Western	W 80–48	2–1	Reed Gym (1,245); Pocatello, ID
Nov 17, 2019*; 2:00 pm, P12N		at Washington State	L 61–72	2–2	Beasley Coliseum (2,704); Pullman, WA
Nov 22, 2019*; 8:00 pm		at Santa Clara	L 65–78	2–3	Leavey Center (1,146); Santa Clara, CA
Nov 27, 2019*; 7:00 pm		West Coast Baptist	W 102–43	3–3	Reed Gym (1,186); Pocatello, ID
Dec 6, 2019*; 7:00 pm		at Pepperdine	L 65–77	3–4	Firestone Fieldhouse (1,150); Malibu, CA
Dec 16, 2019*; 7:30 pm		UC Santa Barbara	L 68–74 ^{OT}	3–5	Reed Gym (1,084); Pocatello, ID
Dec 21, 2019*; 8:00 pm		at Pacific	L 66–77	3–6	Alex G. Spanos Center (1,629); Santa Clara, CA
Big Sky regular season
Dec 28, 2019; 7:00 pm		Idaho	W 62–60	4–6 (1–0)	Reed Gym; Pocatello, ID
Dec 30, 2019; 7:00 pm		Eastern Washington	W 75–69	5–6 (2–0)	Reed Gym (1,437); Pocatello, ID
Jan 4, 2020; 8:00 pm		at Sacramento State	L 49–68	5–7 (2–1)	Hornets Nest (717); Sacramento, CA
Jan 9, 2020; 7:00 pm		Southern Utah	L 55–71	5–8 (2–2)	Reed Gym (1,332); Pocatello, ID
Jan 11, 2020; 4:00 pm		at Northern Arizona	W 71–67	6–8 (3–2)	Walkup Skydome (577); Flagstaff, AZ
Jan 16, 2020; 7:00 pm		Weber State	L 68–76 ^{OT}	6–9 (3–3)	Reed Gym (1,745); Pocatello, ID
Jan 18, 2020; 8:00 pm		at Portland State	L 76–82	6–10 (3–4)	Viking Pavilion (1,105); Portland, OR
Jan 23, 2020; 7:00 pm		Montana	L 74–77	6–11 (3–5)	Reed Gym (1,461); Pocatello, ID
Jan 25, 2020; 7:00 pm		Montana State	L 64–75	6–12 (3–6)	Reed Gym (1,456); Pocatello, ID
Jan 30, 2020; 7:00 pm		at Northern Colorado	L 67–83	6–13 (3–7)	Bank of Colorado Arena (1,477); Greeley, CO
Feb 1, 2020; 7:00 pm		at Southern Utah	L 75–80	6–14 (3–8)	America First Event Center (2,163); Cedar City, UT
Feb 6, 2020; 7:00 pm		Northern Arizona	L 87–88 ^{OT}	6–15 (3–9)	Reed Gym (1,267); Pocatello, ID
Feb 8, 2020; 7:00 pm		Sacramento State	L 59–63	6–16 (3–10)	Reed Gym (1,337); Pocatello, ID
Feb 13, 2020; 7:00 pm		at Montana State	L 69–73	6–17 (3–11)	Brick Breeden Fieldhouse (3,028); Bozeman, MT
Feb 15, 2020; 7:00 pm		at Montana	L 63–78	6–18 (3–12)	Dahlberg Arena (4,657); Missoula, MT
Feb 22, 2020; 7:00 pm		Northern Colorado	L 72–85	6–19 (3–13)	Reed Gym (1,405); Pocatello, ID
Feb 27, 2020; 7:00 pm		Portland State	L 76–89	6–20 (3–14)	Reed Gym (1,396); Pocatello, ID
Mar 2, 2020; 7:00 pm		at Weber State	W 78–70	7–20 (4–14)	Dee Events Center (4,033); Ogden, UT
Mar 5, 2020; 7:00 pm		at Eastern Washington	L 75–100	7–21 (4–15)	Reese Court (1,531); Cheney, WA
Mar 7, 2020; 3:00 pm		at Idaho	L 76-80	7-22 (4-16)	Cowan Spectrum; Moscow, ID
Big Sky tournament
Mar 11, 2020; 2:30 pm, Pluto TV	(11)	vs. (6) Northern Arizona; First round	W 64-62	8-22	CenturyLink Arena (2,503); Boise, ID
*Non-conference game. ^{#}Rankings from AP Poll. (#) Tournament seedings in parentheses. All times are in Mountain Time.
