= 2019–20 Montana Grizzlies basketball team =

American college basketball season

2019–20 Montana Grizzlies basketball
- Conference: Big Sky Conference
- Record: 18–13 (14–6 Big Sky)
- Head coach: Travis DeCuire (6th season)
- Assistant coaches: Chris Cobb; Jay Flores; Zach Payne
- Home arena: Dahlberg Arena

2019–20 Big Sky men's basketball standings
	Conf.				Overall
Team	W		L	PCT	W		L	PCT
Eastern Washington	16	–	4	.800	23	–	8	.742
Northern Colorado	15	–	5	.750	22	–	9	.710
Montana	14	–	6	.700	18	–	13	.581
Portland State	12	–	8	.600	18	–	14	.563
Northern Arizona	10	–	10	.500	16	–	14	.533
Montana State	10	–	10	.500	16	–	15	.516
Southern Utah	9	–	11	.450	17	–	15	.531
Sacramento State	8	–	12	.400	16	–	14	.533
Weber State	8	–	12	.400	12	–	20	.375
Idaho State	4	–	16	.200	8	–	22	.267
Idaho	4	–	16	.200	8	–	24	.250
Note: The conference tournament was canceled prior to the quarterfinals due to the COVID-19 pandemic.

The 2019–20 Montana Grizzlies basketball team represented the University of Montana during the 2019–20 NCAA Division I men's basketball season. The Grizzlies, led by sixth-year head coach Travis DeCuire, played their home games at Dahlberg Arena in Missoula, Montana as members of the Big Sky Conference.

== Previous season ==
The Grizzlies finished the 2018–19 season 26–9 overall, 16–4 in Big Sky play, the Grizzlies won the Big Sky regular season championship. As the No. 1 seed in the Big Sky tournament, they defeated Sacramento State, Weber State, and Eastern Washington to win the tournament, and earned the Big Sky's automatic bid to the NCAA tournament.

Given a No. 15 seed in the West Region of the NCAA Tournament, Montana was defeated by Michigan in the first round for the second consecutive year.

== Offseason ==
=== Departures ===
Name	Number	Pos.	Height	Weight	Year	Hometown	Reason for departure
Donaven Dorsey	2	F	6'7"	214	RS Senior	Lacey, WA	Graduated
Ben Carter	13	F	6'10"	275	Freshman	Adelaide, Australia	Transferred to Cal State Monterey Bay
Ahmaad Rorie	14	G	6'1"	175	RS Senior	Tacoma, WA	Graduated
Jamar Akoh	15	F	6'8"	253	RS Senior	Rancho Cucamonga, CA	Graduated
Bobby Moorehead	24	G	6'7"	182	Senior	Tacoma, WA	Graduated
Kelby Kramer	33	C	6'10"	220	RS Freshman	Rock Springs, WY	Transferred to Minnesota State
Tony Miller	34	F	6'6"	210	Junior	Woodinville, WA	Transferred to Washington State

=== Incoming transfers ===
Name	Number	Pos.	Height	Weight	Year	Hometown	Previous School
Naseem Gaskin	5	G	6'3"	175	RS Freshman	Oakland, CA	Transferred from Utah. Under NCAA transfer rules, Gaskin will have to sit out for the 2019–20 season. Will have three years of remaining eligibility.
Yagizhan Selcuk	22	F	6'7"	235	Sophomore	Istanbul, Turkey	Midseason transferred from Villanova in December during the 2018–19 season. Under NCAA transfer rules, Selcuk has to sit out until December and will be eligible to start in December during the 2019–20 season. Selcuk has two and a half years of remaining eligibility.
Michael Steadman	31	F	6'10"	210	Senior	Union City, CA	Transferred from San Jose State. Under NCAA transfer rules, Steadman will have to sit out for the 2019–20 season. Will have one year of remaining eligibility.
Jared Samuelson	33	F	6'7"		RS Senior	Billings, MT	Junior college transferred from Rocky Mountain College.

=== 2019 recruiting class ===
College recruiting information
Name	Hometown	School	Height	Weight	Commit date
Josh Vazquez #70 PG	Torrance, CA	Bishop Montgomery High School	6 ft 3 in (1.91 m)	200 lb (91 kg)	Apr 12, 2018
Josh Vazquez #70 PG	Recruit ratings: Scout: Rivals: (59)				
Derrick Carter-Hollinger, Jr. SF	El Cajon, CA	Foothills Christian High School	6 ft 5 in (1.96 m)	185 lb (84 kg)	Sep 2, 2018
Derrick Carter-Hollinger, Jr. SF	Recruit ratings: Scout: Rivals: (NR)				
Kyle Owens; SF	Encino, CA	Crespi High School	6 ft 4 in (1.93 m)	180 lb (82 kg)	Oct 6, 2018
Kyle Owens; SF	Recruit ratings: Scout: Rivals: (NR)				
Overall recruit ranking:
Note: In many cases, Scout, Rivals, 247Sports, On3, and ESPN may conflict in their listings of height and weight.; In these cases, the average was taken. ESPN grades are on a 100-point scale.; Sources: "2019 Team Ranking". Rivals.

=== 2020 recruiting class ===
College recruiting information (2020)
Name	Hometown	School	Height	Weight	Commit date
Brandon Whitney; PG	Mission Hills, CA	Bishop Alemany High School	6 ft 1 in (1.85 m)	165 lb (75 kg)	
Brandon Whitney; PG	Recruit ratings: Scout: Rivals: (NR)				
Overall recruit ranking:
Note: In many cases, Scout, Rivals, 247Sports, On3, and ESPN may conflict in their listings of height and weight.; In these cases, the average was taken. ESPN grades are on a 100-point scale.; Sources: "2020 Team Ranking". Rivals.

== Roster ==
2019–20 Montana Grizzlies men's basketball team
Players
Coaches

Pos.	#	Name	Height	Weight	Year	Previous school	Hometown
F	0	Kyle Owens	6 ft 8 in (2.03 m)	210 lb (95 kg)	Fr	Crespi Carmelite	Calabasas, CA
G	1	Timmy Falls	6 ft 2 in (1.88 m)	170 lb (77 kg)	Jr	Dublin	Dublin, CA
G	2	Kendal Manuel	6 ft 4 in (1.93 m)	190 lb (86 kg)	RS Sr	Skyview; Oregon State	Billings, MT
G	3	Josh Vaszquez	6 ft 3 in (1.91 m)	170 lb (77 kg)	Fr	Bishop Montgomery	Torrance, CA
G	4	Sayeed Pridgett	6 ft 5 in (1.96 m)	201 lb (91 kg)	Sr	El Cerrito	Oakland, CA
G	5	Naseem Gaskin	6 ft 5 in (1.96 m)	185 lb (84 kg)	RS Fr	Bishop O'Dowd; Utah	Oakland, CA
G	10	Eddy Egun (W)	6 ft 4 in (1.93 m)	198 lb (90 kg)	RS Fr	El Camino Real	Woodland Hills, CA
G	13	Jett Briceno (W)	6 ft 4 in (1.93 m)	180 lb (82 kg)	Fr	Kentridge	Kent, WA
F	22	Yagizhan Selcuk	6 ft 8 in (2.03 m)	233 lb (106 kg)	RS So	The Phelps School; Towson	Istanbul, Turkey
F	23	Mack Anderson	6 ft 9 in (2.06 m)	207 lb (94 kg)	So	Bozeman	Bozeman, MT
G	24	Freddy Brown III (W) (redshirt)	6 ft 2 in (1.88 m)	172 lb (78 kg)	So	Nathan Hale	Seattle, WA
F	31	Michael Steadman (redshirt)	6 ft 10 in (2.08 m)	231 lb (105 kg)	Sr	James Logan High School; San Jose State	Union City, CA
F	32	Peter Jones (W)	6 ft 8 in (2.03 m)	210 lb (95 kg)	RS So	O'Dea	Seattle, WA
F	33	Jared Samuelson	6 ft 7 in (2.01 m)	215 lb (98 kg)	RS Sr	Billings West; Rocky Mountain	Billings, MT
F	34	Derrick Carter-Hollinger	6 ft 5 in (1.96 m)	207 lb (94 kg)	Fr	Foothills Christian	El Cajon, CA

Head coach

- Travis DeCuire (Montana)

Assistant coach(es)

- Chris Cobb (Menlo)
- Jay Flores (Chico State)
- Zach Payne (Whitworth)

Legend

- (C) Team captain
- (S) Suspended
- (I) Ineligible
- (W) Walk-on
- Injured
- Current redshirt

Roster
Last update: January 8, 2020

== Schedule and results ==
Date time, TV	Rank^{#}	Opponent^{#}	Result	Record	Site (attendance) city, state
Non-conference regular season
Nov 6, 2019*; 8:00 pm, P12N		at Stanford	L 62–73	0–1	Maples Pavilion (2,930); Stanford, CA
Nov 10, 2019*; 2:00 pm		Montana State–Northern	W 64–50	1–1	Dahlberg Arena (2,927); Missoula, MT
Nov 16, 2019*; 3:00 pm, SECN+		at Arkansas; Collegiate Hoops Roadshow	L 46–64	1–2	Bud Walton Arena (13,058); Fayetteville, AR
Nov 18, 2019*; 7:00 pm, SWX MT		Montana Tech; Collegiate Hoops Roadshow	L 72–74	1–3	Dahlberg Arena (2,857); Missoula, MT
Nov 22, 2019*; 9:00 pm, P12N		at No. 25 Washington	L 56–73	1–4	Alaska Airlines Arena (8,370); Seattle, WA
Nov 25, 2019*; 7:00 pm, SWX MT		Texas Southern; Collegiate Hoops Roadshow	W 74–62	2–4	Dahlberg Arena (2,981); Missoula, MT
Nov 29, 2019*; 7:00 pm		Coppin State; Collegiate Hoops Roadshow	W 69–62	3–4	Dahlberg Arena (3,335); Missoula, MT
Dec 1, 2019*; 1:00 pm, ATTSNRM		at New Mexico	L 63–72	3–5	Dreamstyle Arena (10,503); Albuquerque, NM
Dec 6, 2019*; 7:00 pm		North Dakota; Big Sky/Summit Challenge	W 77–70	4–5	Dahlberg Arena (3,698); Missoula, MT
Dec 18, 2019*; 9:00 pm, P12N		at No. 8 Oregon	L 48–81	4–6	Matthew Knight Arena (5,803); Eugene, OR
Dec 21, 2019*; 11:00 am		at Omaha; Big Sky/Summit Challenge	L 82–87 ^{OT}	4–7	Baxter Arena (2,278); Omaha, NE
Big Sky regular season
Dec 28, 2019; 7:00 pm		Northern Arizona	W 79–72	5–7 (1–0)	Dahlberg Arena (4,017); Missoula, MT
Dec 30, 2019; 7:00 pm		Sacramento State	W 52–50	6–7 (2–0)	Dahlberg Arena (1,451); Missoula, MT
Jan 2, 2020; 7:00 pm		at Southern Utah	W 60–58	7–7 (3–0)	America First Event Center (2,059); Cedar City, UT
Jan 4, 2020; 7:00 pm, Eleven		at Northern Colorado	L 66–74	7–8 (3–1)	Bank of Colorado Arena (1,431); Greeley, CO
Jan 9, 2020; 7:00 pm		at Eastern Washington	W 90–63	8–8 (4–1)	Reese Court (1,837); Cheney, WA
Jan 13, 2020; 7:00 pm, SWX MT		Portland State	W 85–70	9–8 (5–1)	Dahlberg Arena (3,252); Missoula, MT
Jan 18, 2020; 7:00 pm, SWX MT		Idaho	W 67–63	10–8 (6–1)	Dahlberg Arena (4,279); Missoula, MT
Jan 23, 2020; 7:00 pm, Eleven		at Idaho State	W 77–74	11–8 (7–1)	Reed Gym (1,461); Pocatello, ID
Jan 25, 2020; 7:00 pm		at Weber State	L 85–87 ^{OT}	11–9 (7–2)	Dee Events Center (6,034); Ogden, UT
Jan 30, 2020; 8:00 pm, Eleven		at Portland State	L 81–88	11–10 (7–3)	Viking Pavilion (1,704); Portland, OR
Feb 1, 2020; 7:00 pm, SWX MT		Montana State	W 78–64	12–10 (8–3)	Dahlberg Arena (7,040); Missoula, MT
Feb 6, 2020; 7:00 pm, SWX MT		Eastern Washington	W 92–82	13–10 (9–3)	Dahlberg Arena (3,879); Missoula, MT
Feb 8, 2020; 6:30 pm		at Idaho	W 82–71	14–10 (10–3)	Cowan Spectrum (1,804); Moscow, ID
Feb 13, 2020; 7:00 pm, SWX MT		Weber State	W 72–37	15–10 (11–3)	Dahlberg Arena (3,730); Missoula, MT
Feb 15, 2020; 7:00 pm		Idaho State	W 78–63	16–10 (12–3)	Dahlberg Arena (4,657); Missoula, MT
Feb 22, 2020; 7:00 pm, SWX MT		at Montana State	W 59–54	17–10 (13–3)	Brick Breeden Fieldhouse (6,570); Bozeman, MT
Feb 27, 2020; 7:00 pm		at Northern Arizona	L 56–57	17–11 (13–4)	Walkup Skydome (918); Flagstaff, AZ
Feb 29, 2020; 8:00 pm		at Sacramento State	W 79–71	18–11 (14–4)	Hornets Nest (1,172); Sacramento, CA
Mar 5, 2020; 7:00 pm, SWX MT		Northern Colorado	W 71–64	18–12 (14–5)	Dahlberg Arena (4,822); Missoula, MT
Mar 7, 2020; 7:00 pm		Southern Utah	L 80–85 ^{OT}	18–13 (14–6)	Dahlberg Arena; Missoula, MT
Big Sky tournament
Mar 12, 2020; 8:00 pm, Pluto TV/Eleven Sports	(3)	vs. (11) Idaho State; Quarterfinals	Canceled due to the COVID-19 pandemic		CenturyLink Arena; Boise, ID
*Non-conference game. ^{#}Rankings from AP Poll. (#) Tournament seedings in parentheses. All times are in Mountain Time.
