= 2019–20 Sacramento State Hornets men's basketball team =

American college basketball season

2019–20 Sacramento State Hornets men's basketball
- Conference: Big Sky Conference
- Record: 16–14 (8–12 Big Sky)
- Head coach: Brian Katz (12th season)
- Assistant coaches: Brandon Laird; Chris Walker; Nate Smith
- Home arena: Hornets Nest (Capacity: 1,012)

2019–20 Big Sky men's basketball standings
	Conf.				Overall
Team	W		L	PCT	W		L	PCT
Eastern Washington	16	–	4	.800	23	–	8	.742
Northern Colorado	15	–	5	.750	22	–	9	.710
Montana	14	–	6	.700	18	–	13	.581
Portland State	12	–	8	.600	18	–	14	.563
Northern Arizona	10	–	10	.500	16	–	14	.533
Montana State	10	–	10	.500	16	–	15	.516
Southern Utah	9	–	11	.450	17	–	15	.531
Sacramento State	8	–	12	.400	16	–	14	.533
Weber State	8	–	12	.400	12	–	20	.375
Idaho State	4	–	16	.200	8	–	22	.267
Idaho	4	–	16	.200	8	–	24	.250
Note: The conference tournament was canceled prior to the quarterfinals due to the COVID-19 pandemic.

The 2019–20 Sacramento State Hornets men's basketball team represented California State University, Sacramento in the 2019–20 NCAA Division I men's basketball season. The Hornets were led by 12th-year head coach Brian Katz and played their home games at the Hornets Nest in Sacramento, California as members of the Big Sky Conference.

The Hornets finished the season 16–14, 8–12 in Big Sky play, to finish in a tie for seventh place. They received the #9 seed in the Big Sky tournament, and went up against the #8 seed Weber State in the first round, winning 64–52. They were scheduled to face off against top seed Eastern Washington in the quarterfinals, but the remainder of the tournament was cancelled due to the ongoing COVID-19 pandemic.

== Previous season ==
The Hornets finished the 2018–19 season 15–16, 8–12 in Big Sky play, to finish in a tie for eighth place. They defeated Northern Arizona in the first round of the Big Sky tournament before losing in the quarterfinals to Montana.

== Roster ==
2019–20 Sacramento State Hornets men's basketball team
Players
Coaches

Pos.	#	Name	Height	Weight	Year	Previous school	Hometown
F	1	Chibueze Jacobs	6 ft 4 in (1.93 m)	195 lb (88 kg)	Sr	Notre Dame HS	Santa Clarita, CA
G	2	Izayah Mauriohooho-Le'afa	6 ft 2 in (1.88 m)	200 lb (91 kg)	Sr	Saint Patrick's College	Wellington, New Zealand
G	3	Rick III Barros	6 ft 5 in (1.96 m)	200 lb (91 kg)	Fr	Nation Wide Academy	Sacramento, CA
G	4	Jamion Wright (W)	5 ft 11 in (1.8 m)	180 lb (82 kg)	Jr	Mission HS	San Francisco, CA
G	11	Brandon Davis	6 ft 2 in (1.88 m)	190 lb (86 kg)	So	Bishop Alemany HS; UC Santa Barbara	Orlando, FL
G	12	Ryan Blackmon	6 ft 0 in (1.83 m)	180 lb (82 kg)	Fr	Culver City HS	Inglewood, CA
G	13	Grant Greabell (W)	6 ft 3 in (1.91 m)	185 lb (84 kg)	So	Estrella Foothills HS	Goodyear, AZ
G	14	William Fitzpatrick	6 ft 3 in (1.91 m)	200 lb (91 kg)	Jr	Vista del Lago HS; Folsom Lake JC	Folsom, CA
G	15	Elijah McCullough	6 ft 3 in (1.91 m)	190 lb (86 kg)	RS Fr	Damien HS	Chino Hills, CA
F	21	Osi Nwachukwu	6 ft 5 in (1.96 m)	195 lb (88 kg)	Sr	San Leandro HS; Antelope Valley	Oakland, CA
F	22	Ethan Esposito	6 ft 7 in (2.01 m)	230 lb (104 kg)	Jr	Torrey Pines HS; San Diego City College	Naples, Italy
G/F	23	Bryce Fowler	6 ft 6 in (1.98 m)	205 lb (93 kg)	Jr	Agua Fria HS	Avondale, AZ
F	24	Jordan Cooke-Harper	6 ft 9 in (2.06 m)	220 lb (100 kg)	So	Don Bosco Prep; Southwestern CC	San Diego, CA
G/F	25	James Bridges	6 ft 5 in (1.96 m)	215 lb (98 kg)	So	Clark HS	Las Vegas, NV
C	30	Joshua Patton	6 ft 8 in (2.03 m)	230 lb (104 kg)	RS Sr	Sierra HS	Manteca, CA
F	34	Spencer Monteiro	6 ft 6 in (1.98 m)	195 lb (88 kg)	Jr	Lodi HS; San Joaquin Delta CC	Woodbridge, CA
G	42	Christian Terrell	6 ft 5 in (1.96 m)	200 lb (91 kg)	Sr	Sacramento HS; UC Santa Barbara	Sacramento, CA

Head coach

- Brian Katz (Sacramento State)

Assistant coach(es)

- Brandon Laird (UC Davis)
- Chris Walker (Oklahoma)
- Nate Smith (Sacramento State)

Legend

- (C) Team captain
- (S) Suspended
- (I) Ineligible
- (W) Walk-on
- Injured
- Current redshirt

Roster
Last update: September 9, 2025

== Schedule ==
Date time, TV	Rank^{#}	Opponent^{#}	Result	Record	Site (attendance) city, state
Non-conference regular season
November 9, 2019*; 7:00 p.m.		Simpson (CA)	W 76–27	1–0	Hornets Nest (528); Sacramento, CA
November 15, 2019*; 7:00 p.m.		UC Riverside	W 62–49	2–0	Hornets Nest (635); Sacramento, CA
November 20, 2019*; 5:30 p.m.		vs. UC Davis	W 61–51	3–0	Golden 1 Center (4,774); Sacramento, CA
November 23, 2019*; 7:00 p.m.		at Pepperdine	W 77–72	4–0	Firestone Fieldhouse (600); Malibu, CA
November 30, 2019*; 6:00 p.m., P12N		at No. 21 Colorado	L 45–59	4–1	CU Events Center (6,170); Boulder, CO
December 3, 2019*; 7:00 p.m.		UC Merced	W 72–36	5–1	Hornets Nest (412); Sacramento, CA
December 7, 2019*; 6:00 p.m.		at Cal State Fullerton	L 45–59	6–1	Titan Gym (576); Fullerton, CA
December 14, 2019*; 2:00 p.m.		at Santa Clara	L 58–60	6–2	Leavey Center (1,008); Santa Clara, CA
December 18, 2019*; 7:00 p.m.		Cal Poly	W 57–56	7–2	Hornets Nest (522); Sacramento, CA
Big Sky regular season
December 28, 2019; 3:00 p.m.		at Montana State	L 51–66	7–3 (0–1)	Brick Breeden Fieldhouse (3,349); Bozeman, MT
December 30, 2019; 6:00 p.m.		at Montana	L 50–52	7–4 (0–2)	Dahlberg Arena (3,846); Missoula, MT
January 4, 2020; 7:00 p.m.		Idaho State	W 68–49	8–4 (1–2)	Hornets Nest (717); Sacramento, CA
January 9, 2020; 7:00 p.m.		Northern Arizona	W 64–57	9–4 (2–2)	Hornets Nest (696); Sacramento, CA
January 11, 2020; 7:00 p.m.		Weber State	W 71–57	10–4 (3–2)	Hornets Nest (601); Sacramento, CA
January 16, 2020; 6:00 p.m.		at Northern Colorado	L 52–71	10–5 (3–3)	Bank of Colorado Arena (1,495); Greeley, CO
January 18, 2020; 12:00 p.m.		at Southern Utah	L 49–74	10–6 (3–4)	America First Event Center (2,018); Cedar City, UT
January 23, 2020; 7:00 p.m.		Portland State	W 66–55	11–6 (4–4)	Hornets Nest (1,014); Sacramento, CA
January 27, 2020; 5:00 p.m.		at Northern Arizona	L 54–69	11–7 (4–5)	Walkup Skydome (605); Flagstaff, AZ
February 1, 2020; 7:00 p.m.		Eastern Washington	L 54–59	11–8 (4–6)	Hornets Nest (828); Sacramento, CA
February 3, 2020; 7:00 p.m.		Idaho	L 53–67	11–9 (4–7)	Hornets Nest (612); Sacramento, CA
February 6, 2020; 6:00 p.m., Eleven		at Weber State	L 66–70	11–10 (4–8)	Dee Events Center (4,022); Ogden, UT
February 8, 2020; 6:00 p.m.		at Idaho State	W 63–59	12–10 (5–8)	Reed Gym (1,337); Pocatello, ID
February 13, 2020; 7:00 p.m.		Southern Utah	W 70–55	13–10 (6–8)	Hornets Nest (914); Sacramento, CA
February 15, 2020; 7:00 p.m.		Northern Colorado	L 65–68	13–11 (6–9)	Hornets Nest (998); Sacramento, CA
February 20, 2020; 6:00 p.m.		at Eastern Washington	L 76–77	13–12 (6–10)	Reese Court (1,823); Cheney, WA
February 22, 2020; 2:00 p.m.		at Idaho	W 67–58	14–12 (7–10)	Cowan Spectrum (974); Moscow, ID
February 27, 2020; 7:00 p.m.		Montana State	W 81–52	15–12 (8–10)	Hornets Nest (786); Sacramento, CA
February 29, 2020; 7:00 p.m.		Montana	L 71–79	15–13 (8–11)	Hornets Nest (1,172); Sacramento, CA
March 7, 2020; 7:00 p.m.		at Portland State	L 72–76	15–14 (8–12)	Viking Pavilion; Portland, OR
Big Sky tournament
March 11, 2020; 8:30 a.m., Pluto TV	(9)	vs. (8) Weber State; First round	W 64–52	16–14	CenturyLink Arena; Boise, ID
March 12, 2020; 11:00 a.m., Pluto TV/Eleven Sports	(9)	vs. (1) Eastern Washington; Quarterfinals	Canceled due to the COVID-19 pandemic		CenturyLink Arena; Boise, ID
*Non-conference game. ^{#}Rankings from AP Poll. (#) Tournament seedings in parentheses. All times are in Pacific.
