= Eastern Washington Eagles men's basketball statistical leaders =

The Eastern Washington Eagles men's basketball statistical leaders are individual statistical leaders of the Eastern Washington Eagles men's basketball program in various categories, including points, rebounds, assists, steals, and blocks. Within those areas, the lists identify single-game, single-season, and career leaders. The Eagles represent Eastern Washington University in the NCAA's Big Sky Conference.

Eastern Washington began competing in intercollegiate basketball in 1903. However, the school's record book does not generally list records from before the 1950s, as records from before this period are often incomplete and inconsistent. Since scoring was much lower in this era, and teams played much fewer games during a typical season, it is likely that few or no players from this era would appear on these lists anyway.

The NCAA did not officially record assists as a stat until the 1983–84 season, and blocks and steals until the 1985–86 season, but Eastern Washington's record books includes players in these stats before these seasons. These lists are updated through the end of the 2020–21 season.

== Scoring ==
Career
Rk	Player	Points	Seasons
1	Bogdan Bliznyuk	2,169	2014–15 2015–16 2016–17 2017–18
2	Venky Jois	1,803	2012–13 2013–14 2014–15 2015–16
3	Ron Cox	1,741	1973–74 1974–75 1975–76 1976–77
4	Tyler Harvey	1,564	2012–13 2013–14 2014–15
5	Irv Leifer	1,550	1941–42 1942–43 1943–44 1944–45 1945–46 1946–47
6	Dave Hayden	1,461	1969–70 1970–71 1971–72 1972–73
7	Rodney Stuckey	1,438	2005–06 2006–07
8	Randy Buss	1,399	1969–70 1970–71 1971–72
9	Alvin Snow	1,396	2000–01 2001–02 2002–03 2003–04
10	Jacob Davison	1,365	2017–18 2018–19 2019–20 2020–21

Season
Rk	Player	Points	Season
1	Bogdan Bliznyuk	741	2017–18
2	Tyler Harvey	738	2014–15
3	Rodney Stuckey	726	2005–06
4	Rodney Stuckey	712	2006–07
5	Bogdan Bliznyuk	701	2016–17
6	Jacob Wiley	694	2016–17
7	Austin McBroom	692	2015–16
8	Tyler Harvey	677	2013–14
9	David Peed	626	1988–89
10	Randy Buss	595	1971–72

Single game
Rk	Player	Points	Season	Opponent
1	Mason Peatling	54	2019–20	Multnomah
2	Bogdan Bliznyuk	45	2016–17	Portland State
	Jacob Wiley	45	2016–17	Portland State
	Rodney Stuckey	45	2005–06	Northern Arizona
5	David Peed	44	1988–89	UC Irvine
6	Tyler Harvey	42	2014–15	Idaho
	Adris DeLeon	42	2007–08	Northern Colorado
8	Jacob Davison	41	2018–19	Northern Arizona
9	Bogdan Bliznyuk	40	2017–18	Sacramento State
	Kevin Sattler	40	1987–88	Idaho State

== Rebounds ==
Career
Rk	Player	Rebounds	Seasons
1	Ron Cox	1,273	1973–74 1974–75 1975–76 1976–77
2	Dave Hayden	1,139	1969–70 1970–71 1971–72 1972–73
3	Venky Jois	1,015	2012–13 2013–14 2014–15 2015–16
4	Randy Buss	858	1969–70 1970–71 1971–72
5	Bogdan Bliznyuk	831	2014–15 2015–16 2016–17 2017–18
6	Mason Peatling	725	2016–17 2017–18 2018–19 2019–20
7	Brandon Moore	690	2006–07 2007–08 2008–09 2009–10
8	Kim Aiken Jr.	649	2018–19 2019–20 2020–21
9	Chris White	620	1997–98 1998–99 1999–00 2000–01
10	Laron Griffin	540	2009–10 2010–11 2011–12

Season
Rk	Player	Rebounds	Season
1	Dick Eicher	436	1950–51
2	Dave Hayden	364	1971–72
3	Jack State	361	1965–66
4	Ron Cox	356	1976–77
5	Ron Cox	328	1975–76
6	Bill Bacon	327	1966–67
7	Randy Buss	324	1970–71
8	Randy Buss	319	1971–72
	Ron Cox	319	1974–75
10	Dave Hayden	318	1972–73

Single game
Rk	Player	Rebounds	Season	Opponent
1	Dave Hayden	28	1971–72	Oregon Tech
2	Mason Peatling	22	2019–20	Northern Colorado
	Kim Aiken Jr.	22	2019–20	Multnomah
	Paul Butorac	22	2006–07	Lewis-Clark State
5	Martin Seiferth	21	2012–13	Northern Colorado
6	Kim Aiken Jr.	19	2019–20	Seattle
	Brandon Moore	19	2009–10	Whitman
8	Martin Seiferth	18	2013–14	Walla Walla
	Cliff Ederaine	18	2011–12	Sacramento State
	John Randa	18	1985–86	Idaho State

== Assists ==
Career
Rk	Player	Assists	Seasons
1	Ed Waters	763	1973–74 1974–75 1975–76 1976–77
2	Ronn McMahon	431	1987–88 1988–89 1989–90
3	Ellis Magnuson	418	2019–20 2020–21 2021–22 2022–23 2023–24
4	Bogdan Bliznyuk	414	2014–15 2015–16 2016–17 2017–18
5	Deon Williams	408	1997–98 1998–99 1999–00
6	Terry Reed	356	1976–77 1977–78 1978–79 1979–80
7	Brian Sullivan	340	1987–88 1988–89 1989–90 1990–91
8	Melvin Bradley	338	1981–82 1982–83 1983–84 1984–85
9	Alvin Snow	318	2000–01 2001–02 2002–03 2003–04
10	Darryl Harris	314	1970–71 1971–72

Season
Rk	Player	Assists	Season
1	Ed Waters	292	1975–76
2	Ed Waters	231	1976–77
3	Ronn McMahon	207	1988–89
4	Ronn McMahon	191	1989–90
5	Ed Waters	170	1974–75
6	Darryl Harris	168	1970–71
7	Deon Williams	164	1997–98
8	Drew Brandon	160	2014–15
	Cliff Colimon	160	2011–12
	Rodney Stuckey	160	2006–07

Single game
Rk	Player	Assists	Season	Opponent
1	Ronn McMahon	18	1988–89	UC-Irvine
2	Ed Waters	17	1975–76	Oregon Tech
	Darryl Harris	17	1970–71	Oregon Tech
4	Jamal Jones	14	1999–00	Cascade
	Ronn McMahon	14	1989–90	Miami-Ohio
6	Drew Brandon	13	2014–15	North Dakota
7	Drew Brandon	12	2013–14	Northern Colorado
	Jason Lewis	12	2000–01	Cal State Northridge
	Brian Sullivan	12	1990–91	Northern Ariz.
	Ronn McMahon	12	1989–90	Idaho State

== Steals ==
Career
Rk	Player	Steals	Seasons
1	Ronn McMahon	225	1987–88 1988–89 1989–90
2	Alvin Snow	212	2000–01 2001–02 2002–03 2003–04
3	Brian Sullivan	146	1987–88 1988–89 1989–90 1990–91
4	Rodney Stuckey	137	2005–06 2006–07
5	Bogdan Bliznyuk	126	2014–15 2015–16 2016–17 2017–18
6	Venky Jois	121	2012–13 2013–14 2014–15 2015–16
7	Dave Henley	120	1979–80 1980–81 1981–82
8	Jeffrey Forbes	119	2009–10 2010–11 2011–12 2012–13
9	David Peed	117	1987–88 1988–89 1989–90
	Melvin Bradley	117	1981–82 1982–83 1983–84 1984–85

Season
Rk	Player	Steals	Season
1	Ronn McMahon	130	1989–90
2	Ronn McMahon	80	1988–89
3	Rodney Stuckey	71	2006–07
4	Alvin Snow	68	2002–03
5	Rodney Stuckey	66	2005–06
6	David Peed	63	1988–89
7	Drew Brandon	61	2014–15
8	George Abrams	57	1980–81
	Wayne Peterson	57	1980–81
10	Nic McClain	56	2024–25

Single game
Rk	Player	Steals	Season	Opponent
1	Ronn McMahon	9	1989–90	Portland
2	Brian Sullivan	8	1990–91	Nevada
	Ronn McMahon	8	1989–90	Brigham Young
	Jim Boxley	8	1967–68	Carroll
	Darryl Harris	8	1970–71	Whitman
6	Rodney Stuckey	7	2006–07	Idaho
	Rodney Stuckey	7	2005–06	Cal Poly
	Alvin Snow	7	2002–03	Washington
	Karim Scott	7	1997–98	Cal Poly, SLO
	Ronn McMahon	7	1988–89	Idaho State
	Ronn McMahon	7	1989–90	Central Washington
	Ronn McMahon	7	1989–90	Washington

== Blocks ==
Career
Rk	Player	Blocks	Seasons
1	Venky Jois	240	2012–13 2013–14 2014–15 2015–16
2	Mason Peatling	112	2016–17 2017–18 2018–19 2019–20
	Martin Seiferth	112	2012–13 2013–14
4	Paul Butorac	99	2003–04 2004–05 2005–06 2006–07
5	Jacob Wiley	94	2016–17
6	Brandon Moore	87	2006–07 2007–08 2008–09 2009–10
7	Ethan Price	83	2021–22 2022–23 2023–24
8	Chris White	79	1997–98 1998–99 1999–00 2000–01
9	Kim Aiken Jr.	76	2018–19 2019–20 2020–21
10	Cliff Ederaine	75	2010–11 2011–12

Season
Rk	Player	Blocks	Season
1	Jacob Wiley	94	2016–17
2	Venky Jois	69	2014–15
3	Martin Seiferth	68	2012–13
4	Venky Jois	66	2012–13
5	Venky Jois	56	2015–16
6	Paul Butorac	51	2005–06
7	Venky Jois	49	2013–14
8	Mason Peatling	46	2019–20
9	Martin Seiferth	44	2013–14
10	Kiree Huie	42	2025–26

Single game
Rk	Player	Blocks	Season	Opponent
1	Martin Seiferth	8	2012–13	Sam Houston State
2	Venky Jois	7	2014–15	Idaho State
	Martin Seiferth	7	2012–13	North Dakota
	Venky Jois	7	2012–13	Northern Colorado
	Martin Seiferth	7	2012–13	Cal State Northridge
6	Jacob Wiley	6	2016–17	San Francisco
	Venky Jois	6	2014–15	Idaho
	Venky Jois	6	2013–14	Idaho State
	Venky Jois	6	2012–13	Sacramento State
	Martin Seiferth	6	2012–13	Utah Valley
	Dexter Griffen	6	1986–87	Idaho State
