= 2016–17 Eastern Washington Eagles men's basketball team =

American college basketball season

2016–17 Eastern Washington Eagles men's basketball

CBI, First Round
- Conference: Big Sky Conference
- Record: 22–12 (13–5 Big Sky)
- Head coach: Jim Hayford (6th season)
- Assistant coaches: Shantay Legans; David Riley; Chris Victor
- Home arena: Reese Court

2016–17 Big Sky men's basketball standings
| | Conf. | | | | Overall |
| Team | W | | L | PCT | W | | L | PCT |
|---|---|---|---|---|---|---|---|---|
| North Dakota † | 14 | – | 4 | .778 | 22 | – | 10 | .688 |
| Eastern Washington | 13 | – | 5 | .722 | 22 | – | 12 | .647 |
| Idaho | 12 | – | 6 | .667 | 19 | – | 14 | .576 |
| Weber State | 12 | – | 6 | .667 | 20 | – | 14 | .588 |
| Montana | 11 | – | 7 | .611 | 16 | – | 16 | .500 |
| Montana State | 11 | – | 7 | .611 | 16 | – | 16 | .500 |
| Sacramento State | 9 | – | 9 | .500 | 13 | – | 18 | .419 |
| Portland State | 7 | – | 11 | .389 | 15 | – | 16 | .484 |
| Northern Colorado* | 7 | – | 11 | .389 | 11 | – | 18 | .379 |
| Northern Arizona | 6 | – | 12 | .333 | 9 | – | 23 | .281 |
| Southern Utah | 3 | – | 15 | .167 | 6 | – | 27 | .182 |
| Idaho State | 3 | – | 15 | .167 | 5 | – | 26 | .161 |
† Conference tournament winner

The 2016–17 Eastern Washington Eagles men's basketball team represented Eastern Washington University during the 2016–17 NCAA Division I men's basketball season. The Eagles were led by sixth-year head coach Jim Hayford and played their home games at Reese Court in Cheney, Washington as members of the Big Sky Conference. They finished the season 22–12, 13–5 in Big Sky play to finish in second place. As the No. 2 seed in the Big Sky tournament, they defeated Sacramento State in the quarterfinals before losing to Weber State in the semifinals. They were invited to the College Basketball Invitational where they lost in the first round to Wyoming.

On March 29, 2017, head coach Jim Hayford left Eastern Washington to take the head coaching job at in-state rival Seattle and was replaced by top assistant Shantay Legans.

== Previous season ==
The Eagles finished the 2015–16 season 18–16, 10–6 in Big Sky play to finish in a tie for fifth place. They defeated Northern Arizona in the first round of the Big Sky tournament before losing to Idaho in the quarterfinals. They received an invitation to the College Basketball Invitational where they defeated Pepperdine to advance to the quarterfinals before losing to Nevada.

== Offseason ==
=== Departures ===
| Name | Number | Pos. | Height | Weight | Year | Hometown | Notes |
|---|---|---|---|---|---|---|---|
| Austin McBroom | 5 | G | 5'9" | 165 | RS Senior | Los Angeles, CA | Graduated |
| Bear Henderson | 11 | F | 6'6" | 215 | RS Freshman | Mission Hills, CA | Transferred to Iowa Western CC |
| Will Ferris | 15 | G | 6'1" | 175 | RS Freshman | Bellevue, WA | Transferred to Azusa Pacific |
| Enrico Nuno | 22 | F | 6'8" | 250 | Sophomore | Half Moon Bay, CA | Dismissed from the team |
| Kyle Reid | 23 | F | 6'8" | 215 | RS Senior | Cleveland, OH | Graduated |
| Venky Jois | 55 | F | 6'8" | 230 | Senior | Boronia, Australia | Graduated |

=== Incoming transfers ===
| Name | Number | Pos. | Height | Weight | Year | Hometown | Previous School |
|---|---|---|---|---|---|---|---|
| Jacob Wiley | 24 | F | 6'7" | 220 | RS Senior | Newport, WA | Transferred from Lewis–Clark State College. Will be eligible to play immediately since Wiley graduated from Lewis–Clark. |

=== 2016 recruiting class ===
College recruiting information
| Name | Hometown | School | Height | Weight | Commit date |
|---|---|---|---|---|---|
| Jacob Davison #67 SG | Montebello, CA | Cantwell Sacred Heart Of Mary High School | 6 ft 4 in (1.93 m) | 175 lb (79 kg) | Sep 30, 2015 |
| Jacob Davison #67 SG | Recruit ratings: Scout: Rivals: (59) | | | | |
| Mason Peatling; PF | Melbourne, Australia | Beaconhills College | 6 ft 8 in (2.03 m) | 215 lb (98 kg) | Nov 11, 2015 |
| Mason Peatling; PF | Recruit ratings: Scout: Rivals: (NR) | | | | |
| Luka Vulikic; SG | Belgrade, Serbia | | 6 ft 5 in (1.96 m) | 190 lb (86 kg) | Apr 13, 2016 |
| Luka Vulikic; SG | Recruit ratings: Scout: Rivals: (NR) | | | | |
Overall recruit ranking:
Note: In many cases, Scout, Rivals, 247Sports, On3, and ESPN may conflict in their listings of height and weight.; In these cases, the average was taken. ESPN grades are on a 100-point scale.; Sources: "2016 Team Ranking". Rivals.

== Roster ==
2016–17 Eastern Washington Eagles men's basketball team
Players
Coaches

| Pos. | # | Name | Height | Weight | Year | Previous school | Hometown |
|---|---|---|---|---|---|---|---|
| G | 0 | Julian Harrell | 6 ft 5 in (1.96 m) | 195 lb (88 kg) | RS Sr | Loyola HS; Penn/City College of San Francisco | Los Angeles, California |
| G | 2 | Ty Gibson | 6 ft 3 in (1.91 m) | 190 lb (86 kg) | So | Issaquah HS | Issaquah, Washington |
| G | 4 | Sir Washington | 6 ft 3 in (1.91 m) | 180 lb (82 kg) | RS Jr | Clark HS | Las Vegas, Nevada |
| G | 5 | Michael Wearne | 6 ft 2 in (1.88 m) | 175 lb (79 kg) | Fr | Box Hill HS | Croydon, Australia |
| G | 10 | Jacob Davison | 6 ft 4 in (1.93 m) | 175 lb (79 kg) | Fr | Cantwell-Sacred Heart HS | Montebello, California |
| G | 12 | Grant Gibb (W) | 6 ft 5 in (1.96 m) | 185 lb (84 kg) | RS Fr | Mark Morris HS | Longview, Washington |
| G | 13 | Luka Vulikic | 6 ft 5 in (1.96 m) | 190 lb (86 kg) | Fr | None | Belgrade, Serbia |
| F | 14 | Mason Peatling | 6 ft 8 in (2.03 m) | 220 lb (100 kg) | Fr | Beaconhills College HS | Melbourne, Australia |
| G | 20 | Cody Benzel (W) | 6 ft 4 in (1.93 m) | 175 lb (79 kg) | RS So | Ferris HS | Spokane, Washington |
| F | 24 | Jacob Wiley | 6 ft 7 in (2.01 m) | 220 lb (100 kg) | RS Sr | Newport HS; Montana/Lewis–Clark | Newport, Washington |
| F | 32 | Bogdan Bliznyuk (C) | 6 ft 6 in (1.98 m) | 215 lb (98 kg) | Jr | Todd Beamer HS | Lutsk, Ukraine |
| F | 34 | Jesse Hunt | 6 ft 7 in (2.01 m) | 210 lb (95 kg) | So | Sir Francis Drake HS | Geraldton, Australia |
| F | 40 | Geremy McKay | 6 ft 7 in (2.01 m) | 225 lb (102 kg) | RS So | Caulfield Grammar School; Albany | Melbourne, Australia |
| G | 42 | Mario Soto | 6 ft 6 in (1.98 m) | 205 lb (93 kg) | RS So | Saddleback Valley Christian; Concordia Irvine | Irvine, California |
| F | 44 | Felix Von Hofe (C) | 6 ft 5 in (1.96 m) | 200 lb (91 kg) | Sr | Wesley College | Melbourne, Australia |

Head coach

- Jim Hayford (Azusa Pacific)

Assistant coach(es)

- Shantay Legans (Fresno State)
- David Riley (Whitworth)
- Chris Victor (UC Irvine)

Legend

- (C) Team captain
- (S) Suspended
- (I) Ineligible
- (W) Walk-on
- Injured
- Current redshirt

Roster

== Schedule and results ==
| Date time, TV | Rank^{#} | Opponent^{#} | Result | Record | Site (attendance) city, state |
Exhibition
| 10/30/2016*; 2:05 pm | | Saint Martin's | W 80–69 | | Reese Court; Cheney, WA |
Non-conference regular season
| 11/11/2016*; 12:05 pm | | Linfield | W 70–46 | 1–0 | Reese Court (1,410); Cheney, WA |
| 11/14/2016*; 6:00 pm, BTN | | at Northwestern; Legends Classic | L 72–86 | 1–1 | Welsh-Ryan Arena (5,604); Evanston, IL |
| 11/17/2016*; 5:00 pm, LHN | | at No. 23 Texas; Legends Classic | L 52–85 | 1–2 | Frank Erwin Center (9,072); Austin, TX |
| 11/21/2016*; 6:05 pm | | Bryant; Legends Classic | W 81–77 | 2–2 | Reese Court (1,221); Cheney, WA |
| 11/22/2016*; 6:05 pm | | Seattle; Legends Classic | W 80–76 ^{2OT} | 3–2 | Reese Court (922); Cheney, WA |
| 11/26/2016*; 6:05 pm | | Denver; EWU Men's Basketball Classic | W 85–80 ^{OT} | 4–2 | Reese Court (1,026); Cheney, WA |
| 11/27/2016*; 6:05 pm | | San Francisco; EWU Men's Basketball Classic | W 96–90 | 5–2 | Reese Court (1,088); Cheney, WA |
| 12/04/2016*; 1:00 pm | | at Seattle | W 93–88 ^{2OT} | 6–2 | KeyArena (1,058); Seattle, WA |
| 12/08/2016*; 6:05 pm | | Great Falls | W 103–76 | 7–2 | Reese Court (1,008); Cheney, WA |
| 12/13/2016*; 6:05 pm | | Morehead State | W 88–86 ^{OT} | 8–2 | Reese Court (1,046); Cheney, WA |
| 12/18/2016*; 10:00 am | | at Northern Kentucky | L 48–70 | 8–3 | BB&T Arena (2,062); Highland Heights, KY |
| 12/20/2016*; 3:30 pm, FS1 | | at No. 17 Xavier | L 56–85 | 8–4 | Cintas Center (10,250); Cincinnati, OH |
| 12/22/2016*; 5:30 pm, P12N | | at Colorado | L 68–76 | 8–5 | Coors Events Center (6,958); Boulder, CO |
Big Sky regular season
| 12/30/2016; 7:00 pm | | at Idaho | W 69–62 | 9–5 (1–0) | Coors Events Center (1,107); Boulder, CO |
| 01/05/2017; 6:05 pm | | Montana State | W 82–64 | 10–5 (2–0) | Reese Court (1,380); Cheney, WA |
| 01/07/2017; 1:05 pm | | Montana | L 59–65 | 10–6 (2–1) | Reese Court (2,107); Cheney, WA |
| 01/12/2017; 6:05 pm | | at Idaho State | W 92–85 | 11–6 (3–1) | Reed Gym (1,404); Pocatello, ID |
| 01/14/2017; 6:05 pm | | at Weber State | L 60–67 | 11–7 (3–2) | Dee Events Center (6,678); Ogden, UT |
| 01/19/2017; 6:05 pm | | Northern Arizona | W 84–62 | 12–7 (4–2) | Reese Court (1,519); Cheney, WA |
| 01/21/2017; 1:05 pm | | Southern Utah | W 83–68 | 13–7 (5–2) | Reese Court (1,621); Cheney, WA |
| 01/26/2017; 6:00 pm | | at Montana | W 72–60 | 14–7 (6–2) | Dahlberg Arena (3,637); Missoula, MT |
| 01/28/2017; 1:00 pm | | at Montana State | L 90–91 | 14–8 (6–3) | Brick Breeden Fieldhouse (2,951); Bozeman, MT |
| 02/02/2017; 6:05 pm | | Sacramento State | W 77–72 | 15–8 (7–3) | Reese Court (1,502); Cheney, WA |
| 02/04/2017; 1:05 pm | | Portland State | W 130–124 ^{3OT} | 16–8 (8–3) | Reese Court (2,026); Cheney, WA |
| 02/09/2017; 5:00 pm | | at North Dakota | L 86–95 | 16–9 (8–4) | Betty Engelstad Sioux Center (1,891); Grand Forks, ND |
| 02/11/2017; 1:00 pm | | at Northern Colorado | W 70–44 | 17–9 (9–4) | Bank of Colorado Arena (1,057); Greeley, CO |
| 02/17/2017; 6:05 pm | | Idaho | W 77–67 | 18–9 (10–4) | Reese Court (2,821); Cheney, WA |
| 02/23/2017; 6:05 pm | | Weber State | W 82–72 | 19–9 (11–4) | Reese Court (2,223); Cheney, WA |
| 02/25/2017; 1:05 pm | | Idaho State | W 89–77 | 20–9 (12–4) | Reese Court (2,025); Cheney, WA |
| 03/02/2017; 5:30 pm | | at Southern Utah | W 91–75 | 21–9 (13–4) | Centrum Arena (2,159); Cedar City, UT |
| 03/04/2017; 3:30 pm | | at Northern Arizona | L 61–76 | 21–10 (13–5) | Walkup Skydome (940); Flagstaff, AZ |
Big Sky tournament
| 03/09/2017; 5:35 pm | (2) | vs. (7) Sacramento State; Quarterfinals | W 89–70 | 22–10 | Reno Events Center (1,903); Reno, NV |
| 03/10/2017; 5:05 pm | (2) | vs. (3) Weber State; Semifinals | L 72–80 | 22–11 | Reno Events Center (2,265); Reno, NV |
CBI
| 03/15/2017*; 6:00 pm | | at Wyoming; First Round | L 81–91 | 22–12 | Arena-Auditorium (1,803); Laramie, WY |
*Non-conference game. ^{#}Rankings from AP Poll. (#) Tournament seedings in parentheses. All times are in Pacific Time Source.

== See also ==
- 2016–17 Eastern Washington Eagles women's basketball team
