= List of Eastern Washington University alumni =

Eastern Washington University is a public university in Cheney, Washington. This is an incomplete list of its notable alumni.

== Academia ==
- Scott M. Fitzpatrick, professor in the Department of Anthropology and associate director for Research and Collections at the Museum of Natural and Cultural History at the University of Oregon
- Adam Jansen, state archivist for the Hawaii State Archives
- Charles Mutschler, archivist and Interim Dean of Eastern Washington University Libraries
- Leslie Wong, psychology professor and president of Northern Michigan University and San Francisco State University

== Arts ==
- Edward Kienholz, installation artist and assemblage sculptor
- Todd McFarlane, creator of the Spawn comic book series, artist, writer, and filmmaker
- Glen Michaels, sculptor and painter

== Entertainment ==
- Ernie Afaganis, Canadian sportscaster, particularly for CBC Television
- Colin Cowherd, sports media personality and host of The Herd with Colin Cowherd
- Ramsey Denison, documentary filmmaker, director, producer, and editor
- Thomas Hampson, Grammy-nominated opera singer
- Austin McBroom, YouTube star
- Ann Sandifur, composer

== Law ==
- R. W. Buzzard, judge of the District Court of Lewis County, Washington

== Literature ==
- Herbert Aldinger, novelist
- Jennifer Boyden, poet
- Elizabeth Cook-Lynn, editor, essayist, poet, and novelist
- Chris Crutcher, author of young adult novels
- Terry Davis, novelist
- Wendy J. Fox, author
- Alma Heflin, pilot, author, and magazine editor
- Derrick Jensen, ecophilosopher, writer, and author
- Paula Meehan, poet and playwright
- Misha, science fiction writer
- Carrie Oeding, poet
- Jess Walter, novelist

== Military ==
- Gary J. Volesky, lieutenant general in U.S. Army, corps commander

== Politics ==
- Eric Anderson, member of the Idaho State Representative
- Bette Cato, former member of the Alaska House of Representatives
- Rob Chase, Washington House of Representatives
- Ali bin Ahmed Al Kuwari, Qatari minister of Finance
- Clarence D. Martin, 11th governor of Washington and Washington House of Representatives
- Alfred Mutua, Kenyan cabinet secretary for Foreign and Diaspora Affairs and governor of Machakos County
- Mike Navarre, mayor of Alaska's Kenai Peninsula Borough, member of the Alaska House of Representatives
- Rahman Owokoniran, former member of the Lagos State House of Assembly
- Margaret Rayburn, educator, member of the Washington House of Representatives
- Karen Stratton, Spokane City Council
- Thomas Wagoner, former member of the Alaska Senate

== Sports ==
- T. J. Ackerman, gridiron football player with the Canadian Football League
- Tom Ackerman, former NFL center
- Vernon Adams, gridiron football player with the Canadian Football League
- Troy Alexander, gridiron football player with the Canadian Football League
- Angelo Allegri, professional basketball player
- Jill Bakken, Olympic bobsledder
- Bruce Barnum, college football coach
- Eric Barriere, professional football player
- Adrian L. Beamer, college football coach and athletics administrator
- Henry Bekkering, professional basketball player
- Aaron Best, college football coach
- Josh Blankenship, college football coach
- Bohdan Blyzniuk, professional basketball player
- Kendrick Bourne, NFL wide teceiver for the Arizona Cardinals
- Lamont Brightful, former NFL cornerback
- Demitrius Bronson, former NFL running back for the Seattle Seahawks
- Paul Butorac, professional basketball player
- Jesse Chatman, former running back for the New York Jets of the National Football League
- Ed Chissus, college football coach
- Dave Christensen, offensive coordinator at the University of Utah
- Zac Claus, professional basketball player
- Dan Curley, former NFL tight end and fullback
- Adris De León, professional basketball player
- Clay DeBord, professional football player
- Samson Ebukam, professional football player
- Shea Emry, gridiron football player with the Canadian Football League
- Luke Fritz, professional football player
- Mark Gehring, professional football player
- Keith Grennan, professional football player
- Tanner Groves, professional basketball player
- Gage Gubrud, football player
- Tyler Harvey, professional basketball player
- Venky Jois, professional basketball player
- Taiwan Jones, NFL running back for the Buffalo Bills
- Brandon Kaufman, former NFL wide receiver for the Buffalo Bills
- Omar Krayem, professional basketball player
- Cooper Kupp, NFL wide receiver for the Seattle Seahawks, Super Bowl champion
- Bashir Levingston, former CFL All-Star
- Robin Lund, professional baseball coach
- Tom Mason, college football coach and former player
- Jim McElwain, former head football coach at the University of Florida
- Ronn McMahon, former Canadian national men's basketball team player,
- Launi Meili, gold medalist in women's three-position smallbore rifle shooting at the 1992 Summer Olympics
- Erik Meyer, quarterback for Spokane Shock
- Kris Monaghan, professional golfer who played on the LPGA Tour
- Don Monson, former college basketball head coach
- Jeff Ogden, former NFL wide receiver
- Aaron Olson, former Australian NBL player for the New Zealand Breakers
- Brittney Page, member of the Canada women's national volleyball team
- Mason Peatling, professional basketball player
- Ryan Phillips, former CFL All-Star
- Jaleen Roberts, track and field athlete who won medals for Team USA at the 2017 World Para Athletics Championships and 2019 Parapan American Games
- Michael Roos, former NFL offensive tackle for the Tennessee Titans
- Kevin Sargent, former NFL offensive tackle
- Kurt Schulz, former NFL player
- Martin Seiferth, professional basketball player
- Ed Simmons, NFL offensive lineman for 11 years for the Washington Redskins, 2x Super Bowl champion
- Tom Sneva, former race car driver, Indianapolis 500 winner in 1983
- Alvin Snow, professional basketball player
- Rodney Stuckey, former NBA player for the Indiana Pacers
- Isaiah Trufant, former NFL cornerback for the New York Jets, younger brother of former Seattle Seahawks cornerback, Marcus Trufant
- John Utendale, professional ice hockey player
- Steele Venters, college basketball player
- Raul Vijil, former AFL player for the Spokane Shock
- Lee Watkinson, professional poker player
- Jacob Wiley, Israeli Basketball Premier League player
