= 2015–16 Eastern Washington Eagles men's basketball team =

American college basketball season

2015–16 Eastern Washington Eagles men's basketball

CBI, Quarterfinals
- Conference: Big Sky Conference
- Record: 18–16 (10–8 Big Sky)
- Head coach: Jim Hayford (5th season)
- Assistant coaches: Shantay Legans; David Riley; Chris Victor
- Home arena: Reese Court

2015–16 Big Sky men's basketball standings
	Conf.				Overall
Team	W		L	PCT	W		L	PCT
Weber State †	15	–	3	.833	26	–	9	.743
Montana	14	–	4	.778	21	–	12	.636
Idaho	12	–	6	.667	21	–	13	.618
Idaho State	11	–	7	.611	16	–	15	.516
Eastern Washington	10	–	8	.556	18	–	16	.529
North Dakota	10	–	8	.556	17	–	16	.515
Montana State	9	–	9	.500	14	–	17	.452
Portland State	8	–	10	.444	13	–	18	.419
Northern Colorado	7	–	11	.389	10	–	21	.323
Sacramento State	6	–	12	.333	14	–	17	.452
Northern Arizona	3	–	15	.167	5	–	25	.167
Southern Utah	3	–	15	.167	5	–	24	.172
† Conference tournament winner

The 2015–16 Eastern Washington Eagles men's basketball team represented Eastern Washington University during the 2015–16 NCAA Division I men's basketball season. The Eagles were led by fifth-year head coach Jim Hayford and played their home games at Reese Court. They were members of the Big Sky Conference. They finished the season 18–16, 10–6 in Big Sky play to finish in a tie for fifth place. They defeated Northern Arizona in the first round of the Big Sky tournament to advance to the quarterfinals where they lost to Idaho. They were invited to the College Basketball Invitational where they defeated Pepperdine to advance to the quarterfinals where they lost to Nevada.

== Previous season ==
The Eagles finished the season 26–9, 14–4 in Big Sky play to finish in a share for the regular season Big Sky championship. They defeated Idaho, Sacramento State, and Montana to be champions of the Big Sky tournament. They received an automatic bid to the NCAA tournament where they lost in the second round to Georgetown.

== Departures ==
Name	Number	Pos.	Height	Weight	Year	Hometown	Notes
Ognjen Miljkovic	0	F	6'7"	220	Sophomore	Belgrade, Serbia	Transferred to Embry-Riddle
Tyler Harvey	1	G	6'4"	185	RS Junior	Torrance, CA	Declare for 2015 NBA draft
Daniel Hill	2	G	5'9"	165	Junior	Sydney, Australia	Went pro
Nate Galago	5	G	5'10"	175	RS Sophomore	Spokane, WA	No longer on team roster
Parker Kelly	10	G	6'4"	195	Senior	Spokane, WA	Graduated
Frederik Jörg	21	C	7'1"	295	RS Sophomore	Korschenbroich, Germany	Transferred to Saint Martin's
Drew Brandon	22	G	6'4"	185	RS Senior	Corona, CA	Graduated
Garrett Moon	33	F	6'5"	190	RS Senior	San Francisco, CA	Graduated

=== Incoming transfers ===
Name	Number	Pos.	Height	Weight	Year	Hometown	Previous School
Julian Harrell	0	G	6'5"	195	Junior	Los Angeles, CA	Transferred from Pennsylvania. Under NCAA transfer rules, Harrell will have to sit out for the 2015–16 season. Will have two years of remaining eligibility.
Austin McBroom	2	G	5'9"	165	RS Senior	North Hollywood, CA	Transferred from Saint Louis. Will be eligible to play immediately since McBroom graduated from Saint Louis.
Rico Nino	22	F	6'8"	250	Sophomore	Half Moon Bay, CA	Junior college transferred from Diablo Valley College
Geremy McKay	33	F	6'7"	225	RS Freshman	Melbourne, Australia	Transferred from Albany. Under NCAA transfer rules, McKay will have to sit out for the 2015–16 season. Will have four years of remaining eligibility.

== 2015 incoming recruits ==
College recruiting information
Name	Hometown	School	Height	Weight	Commit date
Jesse Hunt #79 PF	San Anselmo, CA	Sir Francis Drake High School	6 ft 6 in (1.98 m)	205 lb (93 kg)	Aug 30, 2014
Jesse Hunt #79 PF	Recruit ratings: Scout: Rivals: (64)				
Michael Wearne; PG	Melbourne, Australia	Box Hill High School	6 ft 1 in (1.85 m)	180 lb (82 kg)	Oct 20, 2014
Michael Wearne; PG	Recruit ratings: Scout: Rivals: (NR)				
Ty Gibson; SG	Issaquah, WA	Issaquah High School	6 ft 3 in (1.91 m)	190 lb (86 kg)	Mar 16, 2015
Ty Gibson; SG	Recruit ratings: Scout: Rivals: (NR)				
Overall recruit ranking:
Note: In many cases, Scout, Rivals, 247Sports, On3, and ESPN may conflict in their listings of height and weight.; In these cases, the average was taken. ESPN grades are on a 100-point scale.; Sources: "2015 Team Ranking". Rivals.

== Roster ==
2015–16 Eastern Washington Eagles men's basketball team
Players
Coaches

Pos.	#	Name	Height	Weight	Year	Previous school	Hometown
G	0	Julian Harrell	6 ft 5 in (1.96 m)	195 lb (88 kg)	RS Jr	Loyola HS/Penn/City College of San Francisco	Los Angeles, California
G	2	Ty Gibson	6 ft 3 in (1.91 m)	190 lb (86 kg)	Fr	Issaquah HS	Issaquah, Washington
G	4	Sir Washington	6 ft 3 in (1.91 m)	180 lb (82 kg)	RS So	Clark HS	Las Vegas, Nevada
G	5	Austin McBroom	5 ft 9 in (1.75 m)	165 lb (75 kg)	RS Sr	Campbell HS/Central Michigan/Saint Louis	Los Angeles, California
G	10	Michael Wearne	6 ft 2 in (1.88 m)	175 lb (79 kg)	Fr	Box Hill HS	Croydon, Australia
F	11	Bear Henderson	6 ft 6 in (1.98 m)	215 lb (98 kg)	RS Fr	Village Christian HS	Mission Hills, California
G	12	Grant Gibb (W)	6 ft 5 in (1.96 m)	185 lb (84 kg)	Fr	Mark Morris HS	Longview, Washington
G	15	Will Ferris	6 ft 1 in (1.85 m)	175 lb (79 kg)	RS Fr	Newport HS	Bellevue, Washington
G	20	Cody Benzel (W)	6 ft 4 in (1.93 m)	175 lb (79 kg)	RS Fr	Ferris HS	Spokane, Washington
F	22	Enrico Nuno	6 ft 8 in (2.03 m)	250 lb (113 kg)	So	Half Moon Bay HS/Diablo Valley College	Half Moon Bay, California
F	23	Kyle Reid	6 ft 8 in (2.03 m)	215 lb (98 kg)	RS Sr	Bishop Montgomery HS/Los Angeles Trade Tech	Cleveland, Ohio
F	30	Jesse Hunt	6 ft 7 in (2.01 m)	210 lb (95 kg)	Fr	Sir Francis Drake HS	Geraldton, Australia
F	32	Bogdan Bliznyuk	6 ft 6 in (1.98 m)	215 lb (98 kg)	So	Todd Beamer HS	Lutsk, Ukraine
F	40	Geremy McKay (I)	6 ft 7 in (2.01 m)	225 lb (102 kg)	RS Fr	Caulfield Grammar School/Albany	Melbourne, Australia
F	44	Felix Von Hofe (C)	6 ft 5 in (1.96 m)	200 lb (91 kg)	Jr	Wesley College/Australian Institute of Sport	Melbourne, Australia
F	55	Venky Jois (C)	6 ft 8 in (2.03 m)	230 lb (104 kg)	Sr	Box Hill HS	Boronia, Australia

Head coach

- Jim Hayford (Azusa Pacific)

Assistant coach(es)

- Shantay Legans (Fresno State)
- David Riley (Whitworth)
- Chris Victor (UC Irvine)

Strength and conditioning coach(es)

- Amir Owens (Idaho State)

Athletic trainer(s)

- Kristin Barnett (Kansas)

Legend

- (C) Team captain
- (S) Suspended
- (I) Ineligible
- (W) Walk-on
- Injured
- Current redshirt

Roster
Last update: 13 July 2015

== Schedule ==
Date time, TV	Opponent	Result	Record	Site (attendance) city, state
Non-conference regular season
11/13/2015*; 6:00 pm, SECN	at Mississippi State	L 88–106	0–1	Humphrey Coliseum (9,931); Starkville, MS
11/15/2015*; 3:30 pm	George Fox	W 126–64	1–1	Reese Court (1,214); Cheney, WA
11/18/2015*; 12:35 pm	Seattle	W 76–70	2–1	Reese Court (2,177); Cheney, WA
11/23/2015*; 7:00 pm	at Seattle	L 52–58	2–2	KeyArena (3,129); Seattle, WA
11/28/2015*; 6:30 pm	vs. Pacific; Sacramento State Tournament	W 70–63	3–2	Colberg Court (551); Sacramento, CA
11/29/2015*; 2:30 pm	vs. South Dakota; Sacramento State Tournament	L 71–77	3–3	Colberg Court (314); Sacramento, CA
12/01/2015*; 7:00 pm	at San Francisco	W 81–77	4–3	War Memorial Gymnasium (1,484); San Francisco, CA
12/06/2015*; 2:05 pm	Great Falls	W 104–64	5–3	Reese Court (1,107); Cheney, WA
12/09/2015*; 5:00 pm	at Davidson; Gotham Classic	L 86–96	5–4	John M. Belk Arena (3,714); Davidson, NC
12/11/2015*; 4:00 pm, ESPN3	at Pittsburgh; Gotham Classic	L 51–84	5–5	Petersen Events Center (7,614); Pittsburgh, PA
12/14/2015*; 4:00 pm	at Western Carolina; Gotham Classic	L 80–97	5–6	Ramsey Center (858); Cullowhee, NC
12/17/2015*; 6:05 pm	Morehead State; Gotham Classic			Reese Court; Cheney, WA
12/22/2015*; 12:00 pm	at Denver	W 74–58	6–6	Magness Arena (1,405); Denver, CO
Big Sky regular season
12/31/2015; 4:05 pm	at Northern Colorado	L 90–96	6–7 (0–1)	Bank of Colorado Arena (1,125); Greeley, CO
01/02/2016; 12:05 pm	at North Dakota	L 71–79	6–8 (0–2)	Betty Engelstad Sioux Center (1,542); Grand Forks, ND
01/09/2016; 12:05 pm	Idaho	W 74–60	7–8 (1–2)	Reese Court (3,262); Cheney, WA
01/14/2016; 6:05 pm	Southern Utah	W 106–80	8–8 (2–2)	Reese Court (1,572); Cheney, WA
01/16/2016; 2:05 pm	Northern Arizona	W 96–73	9–8 (3–2)	Reese Court (1,455); Cheney, WA
01/21/2016; 6:05 pm	at Montana State	L 71–85	9–9 (3–3)	Worthington Arena (2,362); Bozeman, MT
01/23/2016; 6:05 pm	at Montana	L 69–74	9–10 (3–4)	Dahlberg Arena (4,923); Missoula, MT
01/28/2016; 6:05 pm	Portland State; The Dam Cup	W 112–83	10–10 (4–4)	Reese Court (1,671); Cheney, WA
01/30/2016; 12:05 pm	Sacramento State	W 74–67	11–10 (5–4)	Reese Court (1,914); Cheney, WA
02/04/2016; 5:35 pm	at Northern Arizona	W 84–73	12–10 (6–4)	Walkup Skydome (1,168); Flagstaff, AZ
02/06/2016; 6:05 pm	at Southern Utah	W 81–67	13–10 (7–4)	Centrum Arena (1,309); Cedar City, UT
02/11/2016; 6:05 pm	North Dakota	W 95–85	14–10 (8–4)	Reese Court (1,650); Cheney, WA
02/13/2016; 2:05 pm	Northern Colorado	W 97–80	15–10 (9–4)	Reese Court (1,689); Cheney, WA
02/18/2015; 7:05 pm	at Sacramento State	W 93–88	16–10 (10–4)	Colberg Court (649); Sacramento, CA
02/20/2016; 7:05 pm	at Portland State; The Dam Cup	L 91–107	16–11 (10–5)	Peter Stott Center (633); Portland, OR
02/27/2016; 1:05 pm	at Idaho	L 62–66	16–12 (10–6)	Memorial Gym (1,500); Moscow, ID
03/03/2016; 6:05 pm	Idaho State	L 71–75	16–13 (10–7)	Reese Court (1,574); Cheney, WA
03/05/2016; 2:05 pm	Weber State	L 77–79	16–14 (10–8)	Reese Court (1,914); Cheney, WA
Big Sky tournament
03/08/2016; 8:00 pm	vs. Northern Arizona; First round	W 74–52	17–14	Reno Events Center (1,723); Reno, NV
03/10/2016; 8:00 pm	vs. Idaho; Quarterfinals	L 73–77	17–15	Reno Events Center (2,365); Reno, NV
CBI
03/16/2016*; 6:05 pm	Pepperdine; First round	W 79–72	18–15	Reese Court (1,518); Cheney, WA
03/21/2016*; 7:00 pm	at Nevada; Quarterfinals	L 70–85	18–16	Lawlor Events Center (6,053); Reno, NV
*Non-conference game. ^{#}Rankings from AP Poll. (#) Tournament seedings in parentheses. All times are in Pacific Time.

== See also ==
- 2015–16 Eastern Washington Eagles women's basketball team
