= David Riley (basketball) =

American basketball player and coach

Current position
- Title: Head coach
- Team: Washington State
- Conference: Pac-12
- Record: 31–35 (.470)
- Annual salary: $650,000

Biographical details
- Born: November 28, 1988 (age 37); Seattle, Washington, U.S.

Playing career
- 2007–2011: Whitworth

Coaching career (HC unless noted)
- 2011–2013: Eastern Washington (GA)
- 2014–2021: Eastern Washington (assistant)
- 2021–2024: Eastern Washington
- 2024–present: Washington State

Administrative career (AD unless noted)
- 2013–2014: Eastern Washington (DBO)

Head coaching record
- Overall: 93–73 (.560)
- Tournaments: 1–1 (NIT); 0–1 (TBC)

Accomplishments and honors

Championships
- 2 Big Sky regular season (2023, 2024)

Awards
- 2× Big Sky Coach of the Year (2023, 2024)

David Riley (born November 28, 1988) is an American college basketball coach and former college basketball player. Riley is the current head men's basketball coach at Washington State University. Previously, he was the head coach at Eastern Washington University for three seasons.

== Playing career ==
Riley grew up in Palo Alto, California. He played college basketball at Whitworth University under Jim Hayford. While starting for the Pirates, Riley was a three-time All-Northwest Conference first-team selection and finished his career ranked fourth all-time in points with 1,664 along with making four NCAA Division III men's basketball tournament appearances, including two Sweet Sixteens and an Elite Eight.

== Coaching career ==
When Hayford accepted the head coaching position at Eastern Washington, Riley followed as a graduate assistant coach. He would be elevated to director of basketball operations two years later, then in 2014 as a full assistant coach. In his first year as an assistant, the Eagles were won both the regular season and Big Sky tournament titles en route to the school's second ever NCAA tournament appearance in 2015. After Hayford accepted the head coaching position at Seattle, Riley stayed on staff under new coach and fellow assistant Shantay Legans. Riley would be a part of a Big Sky regular season title in 2020, along with a Big Sky tournament title the following year for a berth in the 2021 NCAA tournament.

On March 22, 2021, Legans accepted the head coaching position at Portland and four days later, Eastern Washington promoted Riley to head coach.

On April 2, 2024, Riley was announced as the head coach at Washington State University, replacing Kyle Smith, who had departed for Stanford.

In March 2025, the university extended Riley's contract for one year.

== Personal life ==
Riley's father is an anesthesiologist at Stanford, his younger brother, Noah Riley, is an assistant coach for the New York Giants, while his uncle Mike Riley is the former head football coach at Oregon State and Nebraska.

== Head coaching record ==
Record table
Season	Team	Overall	Conference	Standing	Postseason
Eastern Washington Eagles (Big Sky Conference) (2021–2024)
2021–22	Eastern Washington	18–16	11–9	T–5th	TBC First Round
2022–23	Eastern Washington	23–11	16–2	1st	NIT Second Round
2023–24	Eastern Washington	21–11	15–3	1st	
Eastern Washington:		62–38 (.620)	42–14 (.750)		
Washington State Cougars (West Coast Conference) (2024–2026)
2024–25	Washington State	19–15	8–10	T–6th	CBC First Round
2025–26	Washington State	12–20	7–11	8th	
Washington State:		31–35 (.470)	15–21 (.417)		
Total:		93–73 (.560)			
National champion Postseason invitational champion Conference regular season champion Conference regular season and conference tournament champion Division regular season champion Division regular season and conference tournament champion Conference tournament champion
