= 2018–19 Eastern Washington Eagles men's basketball team =

American college basketball season

2018–19 Eastern Washington Eagles men's basketball
- Conference: Big Sky Conference
- Record: 16–18 (12–8 Big Sky)
- Head coach: Shantay Legans (2nd season)
- Associate head coach: Nick Booker
- Assistant coaches: David Riley; Bobby Suarez
- Home arena: Reese Court

2018–19 Big Sky men's basketball standings
	Conf.				Overall
Team	W		L	PCT	W		L	PCT
Montana †	16	–	4	.800	26	–	9	.743
Northern Colorado	15	–	5	.750	21	–	11	.656
Eastern Washington	12	–	8	.600	16	–	18	.471
Weber State	11	–	9	.550	18	–	15	.545
Portland State	11	–	9	.550	16	–	16	.500
Montana State	11	–	9	.550	15	–	17	.469
Southern Utah	9	–	11	.450	17	–	17	.500
Northern Arizona	8	–	12	.400	10	–	21	.323
Sacramento State	8	–	12	.400	15	–	16	.484
Idaho State	7	–	13	.350	11	–	19	.367
Idaho	2	–	18	.100	5	–	27	.156
† Conference tournament winner

The 2018–19 Eastern Washington Eagles men's basketball team represented Eastern Washington University during the 2018–19 NCAA Division I men's basketball season. The Eagles were led by second-year head coach Shantay Legans and played their home games at Reese Court in Cheney, Washington as members of the Big Sky Conference. They finished the season 16–18, 12–8 in Big Sky play to finish in third place. They defeated Montana State and Southern Utah to advance to the championship game of the Big Sky tournament where they lost to Montana.

== Previous season ==
The Eagles finished the 2017–18 season 20–15, 13–5 in Big Sky play to finish in a tie for third place. At the Big Sky tournament they defeated Portland State and Southern Utah to advance to the championship game where they lost to Montana. They were invited to the College Basketball Invitational where they lost in the first round to Utah Valley.

== Offseason ==
=== Departures ===
Name	Number	Pos.	Height	Weight	Year	Hometown	Reason for departure
Sir Washington	4	G	6'3"	180	RS Senior	Las Vegas, NV	Graduated
Richard Polanco	5	F	6'8"	225	Freshman	Santiago de los Caballeros, DR	Transferred to Central Arizona College
Grant Gibb	12	G	6'5"	185	RS Sophomore	Longview, WA	Walk-on; transferred to Linfield College
Benas Griciūnas	15	C	7'0"	244	RS Senior	Šilutė, Lithuania	Graduated
Brendan Howard	23	F	6'6"	225	Freshman	Great Falls, MT	Transferred to Montana State Billings
Bogdan Bliznyuk	32	F	6'6"	215	Senior	Lutsk, Ukraine	Graduated

=== Incoming transfers ===
Name	Number	Pos.	Height	Weight	Year	Hometown	Previous School
Ralueke Orizu	4	F	6'8"	180	Freshman	Austell, GA	Transferred from Savannah State. Under NCAA transfer rules, Orizu will have to sit out for the 2018–19 season. Will have three years of remaining eligibility.

=== 2018 recruiting class ===
College recruiting information
Name	Hometown	School	Height	Weight	Commit date
Austin Fadal #98 SG	San Ramon, CA	Dougherty Valley High School	6 ft 3 in (1.91 m)	170 lb (77 kg)	Nov 30, 2017
Austin Fadal #98 SG	Recruit ratings: Scout: Rivals: (64)				
Mike Meadows; PG	Studio City, CA	Campbell Hall School	6 ft 2 in (1.88 m)	175 lb (79 kg)	Jun 9, 2018
Mike Meadows; PG	Recruit ratings: Scout: Rivals: (0)				
Elijah Jackson; SG	Seattle, WA	Chief Stealth High School	6 ft 4 in (1.93 m)	180 lb (82 kg)	Nov 9, 2017
Elijah Jackson; SG	Recruit ratings: Scout: Rivals: (0)				
Overall recruit ranking:
Note: In many cases, Scout, Rivals, 247Sports, On3, and ESPN may conflict in their listings of height and weight.; In these cases, the average was taken. ESPN grades are on a 100-point scale.; Sources: "2018 Team Ranking". Rivals.

=== 2019 recruiting class ===
College recruiting information (2019)
Name	Hometown	School	Height	Weight	Commit date
Jacob Groves; SF	Spokane, WA	Shadle Park High School	6 ft 5 in (1.96 m)	N/A	Aug 26, 2018
Jacob Groves; SF	Recruit ratings: Scout: Rivals: (0)				
Abdul Mohamed; PF	Seattle, WA	West Seattle High School	6 ft 8 in (2.03 m)	190 lb (86 kg)	Jun 29, 2018
Abdul Mohamed; PF	Recruit ratings: Scout: Rivals: (0)				
Overall recruit ranking:
Note: In many cases, Scout, Rivals, 247Sports, On3, and ESPN may conflict in their listings of height and weight.; In these cases, the average was taken. ESPN grades are on a 100-point scale.; Sources: "2018 Team Ranking". Rivals.

== Roster ==
2018–19 Eastern Washington Eagles men's basketball team
Players
Coaches

Pos.	#	Name	Height	Weight	Year	Previous school	Hometown
G	0	Tyler Kidd (W)	5 ft 11 in (1.8 m)	180 lb (82 kg)	RS Jr	O'Dea HS; Skagit Valley College	Seattle, Washington
G	1	Austin Fadal	6 ft 4 in (1.93 m)	175 lb (79 kg)	Fr	Hillcrest Prep	San Ramon, California
G	2	Ty Gibson	6 ft 3 in (1.91 m)	190 lb (86 kg)	Sr	Issaquah HS	Issaquah, Washington
F	4	Ralueke Orizu	6 ft 9 in (2.06 m)	190 lb (86 kg)	So	South Cobb HS; Savannah State	Austell, Georgia
G	5	Casson Rouse (W)	6 ft 2 in (1.88 m)	180 lb (82 kg)	Fr	Timberline HS	Lacey, Washington
G	10	Jacob Davison	6 ft 4 in (1.93 m)	175 lb (79 kg)	RS So	Cantwell-Sacred Heart HS	Montebello, California
G	11	Jack Perry	6 ft 2 in (1.88 m)	175 lb (79 kg)	So	Camberwell Grammar School	Melbourne, Australia
G	12	Steven Beo	6 ft 3 in (1.91 m)	180 lb (82 kg)	RS So	Richland HS; BYU	Richland, Washington
G	13	Luka Vulikić	6 ft 6 in (1.98 m)	190 lb (86 kg)	Jr	None	Belgrade, Serbia
F	14	Mason Peatling	6 ft 8 in (2.03 m)	220 lb (100 kg)	Jr	Beaconhills College HS	Melbourne, Australia
G	20	Cody Benzel (W)	6 ft 4 in (1.93 m)	175 lb (79 kg)	RS Sr	Ferris HS	Spokane, Washington
G	22	Elijah Jackson	6 ft 4 in (1.93 m)	190 lb (86 kg)	Fr	Chief Sealth HS	West Seattle, Washington
F	23	Jordan Veening (W)	6 ft 6 in (1.98 m)	205 lb (93 kg)	Fr	Nooksack Valley HS	Sumas, Washington
G/F	24	Kim Aiken Jr.	6 ft 7 in (2.01 m)	215 lb (98 kg)	RS Fr	East Valley HS	Redlands, California
G	25	Michael Meadows	6 ft 2 in (1.88 m)	175 lb (79 kg)	Fr	Campbell Hall HS	Hollywood, California
F	34	Jesse Hunt	6 ft 7 in (2.01 m)	210 lb (95 kg)	Sr	Sir Francis Drake HS	Geraldton, Australia
F	35	Tanner Groves	6 ft 9 in (2.06 m)	235 lb (107 kg)	RS Fr	Shadle Park HS	Spokane, Washington
G	42	Joshua Thomas (W)	6 ft 3 in (1.91 m)	185 lb (84 kg)	RS So	Central Valley HS	Spokane, Washington

Head coach

- Shantay Legans (Fresno State)

Assistant coach(es)

- Nick Booker (Davidson)
- David Riley (Whitworth)
- Bobby Suarez (Florida Gulf Coast)

Legend

- (C) Team captain
- (S) Suspended
- (I) Ineligible
- (W) Walk-on
- Injured
- Current redshirt

Roster

== Schedule and results ==
Date time, TV	Rank^{#}	Opponent^{#}	Result	Record	Site (attendance) city, state
Non-conference regular season
Nov 6, 2018*; 4:00 pm, ACCN Extra		at No. 16 Syracuse; 2K Classic campus-site game	L 34–66	0–1	Carrier Dome (19,912); Syracuse, NY
Nov 9, 2018*; 6:00 pm, P12N		at No. 14 Oregon; 2K Classic campus-site game	L 47–81	0–2	Matthew Knight Arena (8,009); Eugene, OR
Nov 16, 2018*; 4:45 pm		Green Bay; 2K Classic subregional semifinals	L 78–82	0–3	Reese Court (1,076); Cheney, WA
Nov 17, 2018*; 3:15 pm, Big Sky Network		UMKC; 2K Classic subregional	W 87–80	1–3	Reese Court; Cheney, WA
Nov 27, 2018*; 6:00 pm, P12N		at Washington	L 59–83	1–4	Alaska Airlines Arena (6,054); Seattle, WA
Dec 1, 2018*; 4:00 pm		at Seattle	L 68–88	1–5	Redhawk Center (999); Seattle, WA
Dec 8, 2018*; 5:00 pm		at North Dakota State	L 67–74	1–6	Scheels Center (2,373); Fargo, ND
Dec 13, 2018*; 7:00 pm		at San Francisco	L 63–85	1–7	War Memorial Gymnasium (1,439); San Francisco, CA
Dec 15, 2018*; 4:00 pm, P12N		at Stanford	L 62–78	1–8	Maples Pavilion (3,663); Stanford, CA
Dec 18, 2018*; 6:05 pm		South Dakota State	L 64–74	1–9	Reese Court (1,042); Cheney, WA
Dec 21, 2018*; 2:05 pm		Corban	W 92–73	2–9	Reese Court (969); Cheney, WA
Big Sky regular season
Dec 29, 2018; 2:05 pm		Weber State	L 72–84	2–10 (0–1)	Reese Court (1,051); Cheney, WA
Dec 31, 2018; 1:05 pm		Idaho State	W 65–55	3–10 (1–1)	Reese Court (1,011); Cheney, WA
Jan 3, 2019; 7:30 pm		at Idaho	L 71–74	3–11 (1–2)	Cowan Spectrum (1,069); Moscow, ID
Jan 7, 2019; 6:05 pm		at Northern Colorado	L 63–75	3–12 (1–3)	Bank of Colorado Arena (1,389); Greeley, CO
Jan 10, 2019; 6:05 pm		Montana	W 78–71	4–12 (2–3)	Reese Court (1,578); Cheney, WA
Jan 19, 2019; 2:05 pm		Montana State	W 85–81	5–12 (3–3)	Reese Court (1,382); Cheney, WA
Jan 24, 2019; 7:05 pm		at Portland State	L 65–78	5–13 (3–4)	Viking Pavilion (1,088); Portland, OR
Jan 26, 2019; 7:05 pm		at Sacramento State	W 94–92 ^{OT}	6–13 (4–4)	Hornets Nest (708); Sacramento, CA
Feb 2, 2019; 2:05 pm		Southern Utah	W 82–79	7–13 (5–4)	Reese Court (1,244); Cheney, WA
Feb 4, 2019; 6:05 pm		Northern Arizona	W 82–64	8–13 (6–4)	Reese Court (1,148); Cheney, WA
Feb 7, 2019; 6:05 pm		at Montana State	L 66–74	8–14 (6–5)	Brick Breeden Fieldhouse (2,267); Bozeman, MT
Feb 9, 2019; 6:05 pm		at Montana	L 74–75	8–15 (6–6)	Dahlberg Arena (5,005); Missoula, MT
Feb 16, 2019; 2:05 pm		Northern Colorado	W 88–78 ^{OT}	9–15 (7–6)	Reese Court (1,481); Cheney, WA
Feb 18, 2018; 4:15 pm		Idaho	W 82–57	10–15 (8–6)	Reese Court (1,618); Cheney, WA
Feb 21, 2019; 5:35 pm		at Southern Utah	L 62–76	10–16 (8–7)	America First Events Center (1,578); Cedar City, UT
Feb 23, 2019; 1:00 pm		at Northern Arizona	W 86–73	11–16 (9–7)	Walkup Skydome (1,923); Flagstaff, AZ
Feb 28, 2019; 6:05 pm		Sacramento State	L 56–59	11–17 (9–8)	Reese Court (1,027); Cheney, WA
Mar 2, 2019; 2:05 pm		Portland State	W 68–66	12–17 (10–8)	Reese Court (1,502); Cheney, WA
Mar 7, 2018; 6:05 pm		at Idaho State	W 91–62	13–17 (11–8)	Holt Arena (1,484); Pocatello, ID
Mar 9, 2018; 6:05 pm		at Weber State	W 80–77	14–17 (12–8)	Dee Events Center (7,113); Ogden, UT
Big Sky tournament
Mar 14, 2019; 7:00 pm, ELVN	(3)	vs. (6) Montana State; Quarterfinals	W 90–84	15–17	CenturyLink Arena; Boise, ID
Mar 15, 2019; 7:00 pm, ELVN	(3)	vs. (7) Southern Utah; Semifinals	W 77–61	16–17	CenturyLink Arena (2,900); Boise, ID
Mar 16, 2019; 5:05 pm, ESPNU	(3)	vs. (1) Montana; Championship	L 62–68	16–18	CenturyLink Arena (3,737); Boise, ID
*Non-conference game. ^{#}Rankings from AP Poll. (#) Tournament seedings in parentheses. All times are in Pacific Time.

== See also ==
- 2018–19 Eastern Washington Eagles women's basketball team
