= Shantay Legans =

American college basketball coach (born 1981)

Current position
- Title: Head coach
- Team: Portland
- Conference: WCC
- Record: 72–94 (.434)

Biographical details
- Born: July 30, 1981 (age 45); Ventura, California, U.S.

Playing career
- 1999–2002: California
- 2003–2004: Fresno State
- 2005–2006: BSW Weert
- 2006–2007: Donar
- Position: Guard

Coaching career (HC unless noted)
- 2007–2009: Laguna Blanca School (asst.)
- 2009–2017: Eastern Washington (asst.)
- 2017–2021: Eastern Washington
- 2021–present: Portland

Head coaching record
- Overall: 147–143 (.507)
- Tournaments: 0–1 (NCAA Division I); 0–1 (CBI); 1–1 (TBC)

Accomplishments and honors

Championships
- Big Sky regular season (2020); Big Sky tournament (2021)

Awards
- Big Sky Coach of the Year (2020)

Shantay Andrade Legans (born July 30, 1981) is an American college basketball coach who is currently men's basketball head coach at Portland. Legans grew up in Goleta, California and played college basketball at California and Fresno State. He briefly played professional basketball in the Netherlands before beginning a coaching career.

From 2007 to 2009, Legans was an assistant coach at the Laguna Blanca School. Legans then was an assistant coach at Eastern Washington under head coaches Kirk Earlywine and Jim Hayford during a period where Eastern Washington turned around from a losing program to one of the top teams in the Big Sky Conference. Eastern Washington promoted Legans to head coach in 2017 after Hayford resigned for another job. As head coach, Legans led Eastern Washington to a Big Sky regular season title in 2020 and conference tournament title in 2021; he was the 2020 Big Sky Coach of the Year in men's basketball. On March 22, 2021, it was confirmed that Legans would leave Eastern Washington for the head coaching position at Portland.

== Early life and education ==
Born in Ventura, California, Legans graduated from Dos Pueblos High School in Goleta, California. He attended the University of California, Berkeley, where he played at guard for the California Golden Bears from 1999 to 2002. Legans then transferred to California State University, Fresno to play for his godfather, Ray Lopes. After redshirting one season, he averaged 15.0 points and 5.6 assists as a senior for the Fresno State Bulldogs in 2003–04. Legans graduated from Fresno State in 2004 with a bachelor's degree in African American studies.

== Professional basketball career ==
Legans played professional basketball in Europe from 2005 to 2007. In the 2005–06 season, he played for BSW Weert of the Dutch Basketball League, averaging 12.5 points, 3.1 rebounds, and 7.2 assists in 26 games.

Legans signed with Donar (then named Hanzevast Capitals for sponsorship reasons), also in the Dutch Basketball League, in November 2006. Legans averaged 6.7 points, 1.4 rebounds, and 1.6 assists in 2006–07 with Hanzevast.

== Coaching career ==
=== Early coaching career (2007–2017) ===
From 2007 to 2009, Legans was an assistant coach at Laguna Blanca School in Santa Barbara, California. In 2009, Legans joined Eastern Washington University as a men's basketball assistant coach under Kirk Earlywine. Legans was retained by new head coach Jim Hayford in 2011. After five straight losing seasons, the 2014–15 Eastern Washington Eagles team went 26–9 with the Big Sky Conference regular season title and won the 2015 Big Sky tournament for automatic qualification for the NCAA tournament. Eastern Washington followed that breakthrough season with two straight winning seasons with appearances in the 2016 and 2017 College Basketball Invitational (CBI) tournaments.

=== Eastern Washington head coach (2017–2021) ===
On March 29, 2017, after Hayford resigned to become head coach at Seattle University, Legans was promoted to head coach at Eastern Washington.

As head coach, Legans continued the success of Hayford, leading the 2017–18 Eagles to the program's fourth straight winning season at 20–15 and third straight CBI appearance. The 2018–19 team went 16–18 but finished as runners-up in the Big Sky tournament. The 2019–20 team improved to 23–8 with a Big Sky regular season title and program best 16 conference wins. On March 10, 2020, the Big Sky Conference named Legans its men's basketball coach of the year. Two days later, the Big Sky tournament was canceled due to COVID-19.

In 2020–21, Eastern Washington went 16–8, including 12–3 in the Big Sky for a second place tie in the conference standings. Eastern Washington went on to win the Big Sky tournament for the first time since 2015 and under Legans.

=== Portland head coach (2021–present) ===
On March 22, 2021, it was confirmed that Legans would accept the head coaching position at Portland.

== Personal life ==
In 2014, Legans married Tatjana Sparavalo, a former Eastern Washington basketball player; they have two children.

== Head coaching record ==
Record table
Season	Team	Overall	Conference	Standing	Postseason
Eastern Washington Eagles (Big Sky Conference) (2017–2021)
2017–18	Eastern Washington	20–15	13–5	T–3rd	CBI first round
2018–19	Eastern Washington	16–18	12–8	3rd	
2019–20	Eastern Washington	23–8	16–4	1st	Postseason cancelled
2020–21	Eastern Washington	16–8	12–3	T–2nd	NCAA Division I Round of 64
Eastern Washington:		75–49 (.605)	53–20 (.726)		
Portland Pilots (West Coast Conference) (2021–present)
2021–22	Portland	19–15	7–7	6th	TBC quarterfinal
2022–23	Portland	13–18	5–11	8th	
2023–24	Portland	12–21	5–11	T–6th	
2024–25	Portland	12–20	7–11	8th	
2025–26	Portland	15–19	6–12	T–9th	
2026–27	Portland	0–0	0–0		
Portland:		72–94 (.434)	30–52 (.366)		
Total:		147–143 (.507)			
National champion Postseason invitational champion Conference regular season champion Conference regular season and conference tournament champion Division regular season champion Division regular season and conference tournament champion Conference tournament champion
