= Bohdan Blyzniuk =

Ukrainian basketball player (born 1995)

Bohdan Blyzniuk Богдан Близнюк
Free Agent
- Position: Shooting guard / small forward

Personal information
- Born: March 31, 1995 (age 31) Lutsk, Ukraine
- Listed height: 6 ft 6 in (1.98 m)
- Listed weight: 215 lb (98 kg)

Career information
- High school: Todd Beamer (Federal Way, Washington)
- College: Eastern Washington (2014–2018)
- NBA draft: 2018: undrafted
- Playing career: 2018–present

Career history
- 2018–2019: Bnei Herzliya
- 2019–2021: Kyiv-Basket
- 2021–2023: BC Budivelnyk
- 2023: Cholet Basket
- 2024–2025: CBet Jonava
- 2025–2026: Kaohsiung Aquas

Career highlights
- AP Honorable Mention All-American (2018); Big Sky Player of the Year (2018); First–team All-Big Sky (2018); 2× Second-team All-Big Sky (2016, 2017); Big Sky Freshman of the Year (2015)

Bohdan Olexandrovich Blyzniuk (Note: Ukrainian: Богдан Олександрович Близнюк, romanized: Bohdan Oleksandrovych Blyzniuk) (Ukrainian: Богдан Близнюк; born March 31, 1995) is a Ukrainian basketball player who last played for the Kaohsiung Aquas of the Taiwan Professional Basketball League (TPBL). He played college basketball for the Eastern Washington Eagles, where he was named Big Sky Conference Player of the Year in 2018.

== Early life ==
Blyzniuk was born in Lutsk, Ukraine. He was less than 2 years old when his father, a truck driver, died in an accident. Their mother moved them to Federal Way, Washington five years later to be closer to family. His older brother, Dmytro, and his mother, Liudmyla, helped raise Bohdan, while also caring for his grandmother.

Blyzniuk became a U.S. citizen in February 2016.

== College career ==
Blyzniuk played college basketball for the Eastern Washington University's Eagles.

On March 9, 2018, Blyzniuk became the Big Sky Conference’s all-time leading scorer, passing Orlando Lightfoot’s mark of 2,102 set in 1994. Earlier in the season, Bliznyuk claimed the school all-time scoring mark, passing Venky Jois’ total of 1,803. Bliznyuk's conference career scoring mark stood until the following season, when Montana State's Tyler Hall broke it.

Bohdan finished his senior year averaging 21.1 points, 6.8 rebounds and 3.9 assists per game. He was named Big Sky Conference Player of the Year and AP Honorable Mention.

== Professional career ==
After going undrafted in the 2018 NBA draft, Blyzniuk joined the Los Angeles Clippers for the 2018 NBA Summer League.

On July 5, 2018, Blyzniuk started his professional career with Bnei Herzliya of the Israeli Premier League, signing a three-year deal. On January 21, 2019, Bohdan recorded a season-high 18 points, shooting 7-of-13 from the field, in an 81–100 loss to Hapoel Eilat. That season, Bnei Herzliya have finished the season in the last place out of 12 teams and was relegated to the Israeli National League (the second-tier league in Israel).

On September 30, 2019, Blyzniuk signed with Kyiv-Basket of the Ukrainian SuperLeague. During the 2020–21 season, he averaged 12.4 points, 5.5 rebounds, and 3.2 assists per game. On September 16, 2021, Bohdan signed with BC Budivelnyk.

In the 2022-23 season, he signs for BC Budivelnyk to play in the FIBA Europe Cup (playing at home in Italy) and the Balkan League.

On March 22, 2023, he signed with Cholet Basket of the French LNB Pro A.

On August 14, 2024, Bliznyuk signed with CBet Jonava of the Lithuanian Basketball League (LKL).

On November 10, 2025, Bliznyuk signed with the Kaohsiung Aquas of the Taiwan Professional Basketball League (TPBL).

On July 26, 2026, the Kaohsiung Aquas announced that Bliznyuk left the team. On August 19, Bliznyuk signed with the New Taipei CTBC DEA of the Taiwan Professional Basketball League (TPBL). On September 29, New Taipei CTBC DEA voided his contract after he failed his physical.

== National team career ==
Blyzniuk is a member of the Ukraine national team. On November 29, 2018, he made his debut in an 82–54 win over Slovenia, scoring 11 points, seven rebounds and five assists.

== Career statistics ==
Legend
GP	Games played	GS	Games started	MPG	Minutes per game
FG%	Field goal percentage	3P%	3-point field goal percentage	FT%	Free throw percentage
RPG	Rebounds per game	APG	Assists per game	SPG	Steals per game
BPG	Blocks per game	PPG	Points per game	**Bold**	Career high

=== College ===
Year	Team	GP	GS	MPG	FG%	3P%	FT%	RPG	APG	SPG	BPG	PPG
2014–15	Eastern Washington	35	0	19.0	**.586**	**.558**	.792	4.0	1.1	0.5	0.4	8.7
2015–16	Eastern Washington	34	32	33.0	.447	.355	.798	6.7	3.0	**1.2**	**0.7**	12.4
2016–17	Eastern Washington	34	33	**36.8**	.474	.317	.821	6.5	**4.0**	1.0	0.2	20.6
2017–18	Eastern Washington	**35**	**35**	35.1	.528	.398	**.902**	**6.8**	3.9	0.8	0.2	**21.1**
Career		138	100	30.9	.500	.378	.840	6.0	3.0	0.9	0.4	15.7

Source: RealGM
