= Jerry Krause (basketball, born 1936) =

American college basketball executive (1936–2023)

Jerry Krause (April 3, 1936 – May 24, 2023) was an American college basketball coach and director. He was the director of basketball operations for Gonzaga University between 1985 and 2015. Before joining Gonzaga, he primarily worked as a basketball coach at high schools in Iowa and Loveland, Colorado, from 1959 to 1964. After he moved to varsity basketball in 1964, he was an assistant coach for Colorado State College (now the University of Northern Colorado) until 1967. From 1967 to 1985, he primarily coached at Eastern Washington University for its men's basketball team. With Eastern Washington, he had 291 wins and 197 losses before he became an assistant coach for the university from 1993 to 1994.

As an executive, Krause became the research committee chairperson for the National Association of Basketball Coaches in 1966. While continuing to hold his research chair until the 2010s, he was the rules chair for NCAA basketball in the late 1980s. In 1992, he co-invented a tool to measure the tension of basketball rims. From the NABC, he received the Cliff Wells Appreciation Award in 1998 and a Guardians of the Game Pillar Award in 2003. He joined the National Collegiate Basketball Hall of Fame in 2022.

== Early life and education ==
Krause was born in Cedar Bluffs, Nebraska, on April 3, 1936. He grew up with four siblings while living on a farm. After the death of his parents during his childhood, Krause lived with his uncle and aunt. He played multiple sports before attending post-secondary education.

In the early 1950s, Krause went to the University of Nebraska for an engineering program. He then withdrew from Nebraska for a teacher's program at Wayne State College during the mid-1950s. During the 1960s, Krause studied math and biomechanics at Colorado State College., earning his masters and doctoral degrees there.

== Career ==
=== High school ===
In 1959, Krause was an assistant football coach for Adair-Casey High School in Iowa. During his time at Adair-Casey, Krause held coaching positions in athletics and basketball by 1961. Upon ending his coaching tenure with the Iowa high school that year, Krause had 32 wins and 13 losses in boys basketball.

During November 1961, Krause went to Loveland, Colorado, and joined Berthoud High School as a coach. In 1964, his boys basketball team qualified for the Colorado State Basketball Tournament after Berthoud won the North Central District B title. During the B division boys basketball championship held by the Colorado High School Activities Association that year, Berthoud won the consolation game.

=== University ===
While at Colorado State College between 1965 and 1967, Krause worked as an assistant basketball coach for the university. In 1967, Krause became the men's basketball coach for Eastern Washington University in the NAIA. While with Eastern Washington, his team joined NCAA Division II in 1977. Upon starting a sabbatical from Eastern Washington in 1982, Krause went to Oregon State University and coached their basketball team as a volunteer.

The following year, Krause resumed his coaching position with Eastern Washington. During his second tenure with Eastern Washington, his team played in the NCAA Division I from 1983 to 1985. Krause lost his Eastern Washington coaching position in January 1985 and remained with the basketball team until March 1985. Krause had a combined total of 261 wins and 197 losses with Eastern Washington.

In August 1985, Krause became a volunteer basketball coach for Gonzaga University. By 1987, Krause was also in charge of physical education for Eastern Washington. The following year, Krause was promoted by Gonzaga to part-time. Krause's tenure at Eastern Washington as their chair had ended by January 1991.

Krause became an assistant coach for Eastern Washington's men's basketball team in 1993. He remained with Eastern Washington until 1994. In 2001, Krause started working as the director of basketball operations for Gonzaga. He primarily worked as a scheduler while in his director position with Gonzaga. Krause ended his career with Gonzaga in 2015.

Beyond basketball, Dr. Krause had a profound impact as a professor, professional servant (e.g., President of the Washington Association for Health, Physical Education, Recreation and Dance [WAHPERD]), and scholar. He published both academic and research articles in a range of journals, including both the “Journal of Physical Education, Recreation and Dance” (first published in 1896, it is the oldest, continuously published professional journal in the field) and the “Research Quarterly for Exercise and Sport” (first published in 1930, it is the oldest, continuously published research journal in the field). In addition to his numerous authored, coauthored, and edited basketball books, he coauthored academic books. For example, the 1975 book, "The Mechanical Foundations of Human Motion: A Programmed Text" (Authors: Jerome V. Krause and Jerry N. Barnham); and the 1989 book, "Physical Fitness: The Hub of the Wellness Wheel" (Authors: Bradley J. Cardinal and J. V. "Jerry" Krause), which was revised and republished in 1992 (Authors: Bradley J. Cardinal, J. V. "Jerry" Krause, and Mary E. Drabbs). Upon retirement from his academic position at Eastern Washington University, he was awarded the title of Professor Emeritus.

=== Executive and other positions ===
As an chairperson, Krause began leading the research committee for the National Association of Basketball Coaches in 1966. By 1992, he had held the position for over 25 years. He continued his executive tenure during the 2000s and 2010s. While with the NABC, Krause was the president of its NAIA section from 1979 to 1980. He also joined the NABC's board of directors in 1979 and was scheduled to end his tenure in 1991. In 1981, Krause was an assistant coach at the men's basketball event during the U.S. Olympic Festival.

Between 1984 and 1992, Krause worked on a rim measuring tool as a co-inventor with Bruce Abbott. With his invention, Krause spent five years measuring the tension of basketball rims. In 1992, the NCAA "set recommendations on the proper tension" after speaking with Krause. The NCAA Division I began measuring the tension of their basketball rims in 2004 "prior to the season, before every conference tournament, and at all NCAA Tournament venues."

From 1981 to 1984, he was part of the NCAA Basketball Rules Committee. During 1986, Krause became the rules chairperson. When he was with the committee in 1987, Krause believed that the shot clock, three-pointers and the halfcourt divider should be removed from their basketball games. By 1988, Krause's chair position had ended. While part of the Basketball Rules Committee for the NCAA in 1991, Krause worked for the National Basketball Hall of Fame as an inductee elector.

While working as an assistant coach for Gonzaga and as a professor for Eastern Washington in October 1991, the United States Military Academy gave Krause a visiting professor position. He worked at the Military Academy the following year. Krause resumed his USMA experience from 1996 to 2001. During this time period, Krause led their physical education section and taught philosophy of sport as a professor. He had over 60 released works in basketball by 2005, with the majority of them being movies and books. Krause used John Wooden's lessons as his basis to create the "Be Like Coach" initiative for children at St. Aloysius Gonzaga Catholic School in 2012.

== Awards and honors ==
Krause received the Cliff Wells Appreciation Award in 1998 from the National Association of Basketball Coaches. In 2003, he was given a Guardians of the Game Pillar Award in the advocacy category by the NABC. From individual universities, Krause received the Contribution of Sport Award from the University of Northern Colorado in 2001. In 2007, Krause was presented with the Alumni Achievement Award from Wayne State College.

Krause's contributions to the sport of basketball in particular have been recognized in perpetuity through his induction into multiple Halls of Fame. In 2000, he was inducted into both the National Association of Intercollegiate Athletics (NAIA) Hall of Fame and the National Association for Sport & Physical Education (NASPE) Hall of Fame. In 2005 he was inducted into the Eastern Washington University Athletics Hall of Fame. During 2013, Krause became part of the Inland Northwest Sports Hall of Fame. Serving as Head Coach, his 1976-1977 Basketball Team was inducted into the Eastern Washington University Hall of Fame on October 1, 2016. Finally, he was inducted into the National Collegiate Basketball Hall of Fame in 2022.

== Death ==
Krause died of colon cancer on May 24, 2023, at his home in Cheney, Washington, at the age of 87.
