= Doug Wrenn =

American basketball player

Personal information
- Born: January 21, 1980 (age 46) Seattle, Washington, U.S.
- Listed height: 6 ft 8 in (2.03 m)
- Listed weight: 220 lb (100 kg)

Career information
- High school: O'Dea (Seattle, Washington)
- College: UConn (1999–2000); Washington (2001–2003)
- NBA draft: 2003: undrafted
- Playing career: 2003–2008
- Position: Small forward
- Number: 24

Career history
- 2005: Njarðvík
- 2005: Mornar Bar
- 2007–2008: DB Promy

Career highlights
- First-team All-Pac-12 (2002)

Doug Wrenn (born January 21, 1980) is an American basketball player who played forward for the University of Connecticut and the University of Washington. He was named Washington High School Player of the Year in 1998.

== Career ==
Wrenn led O'Dea High School to a state championship as a junior and was named Parade Magazine prep All-American as a senior. He was a former 2 time Washington player of the year. He was convicted of assault in 2009. He was ranked by Complex as the 19th best player that never made it to the NBA.

== Professional career ==
Wrenn signed with Úrvalsdeild karla club Njarðvík in March 2005, along with Alvin Snow, replacing Americans Anthony Lackey and Matt Sayman. He appeared in two playoff games for Njarðvík against ÍR, averaging 25.5 points and 12.5 rebounds in the 0-2 series loss.

== Personal life ==
In 2021, Wrenn graduated with honors with a sociology degree from the University of Washington.
