= Chris Victor =

American basketball coach (born 1982)

Current position
- Title: Head coach
- Team: Seattle
- Conference: WCC
- Record: 101–67 (.601)

Biographical details
- Born: March 24, 1982 (age 44)

Playing career
- 2001–2004: Concordia–Irvine

Coaching career (HC unless noted)
- 2005–2006: Citrus College (assistant)
- 2006–2010: Concordia–Irvine (assistant)
- 2010–2015: Citrus College
- 2015–2017: Eastern Washington (assistant)
- 2017–2022: Seattle (assistant/interim HC)
- 2022–present: Seattle

Head coaching record
- Overall: 101–67 (.601) (NCAA); 103–39 (.725) (NJCAA)
- Tournaments: 4–0 (CBI); 1–0 (NIT)

Accomplishments and honors

Championships
- CBI (2024); WAC regular season (2022)

Awards
- WAC Coach of the Year (2022)

Christopher Karl Victor (born March 24, 1982) is an American college basketball head coach who is currently the head coach at Seattle University.

== Playing career ==
Victor attended Concordia–Irvine from 2001 to 2004. He helped lead Concordia to a NAIA title in 2003. Victor scored a season-high 26 points and recorded 9 assists in the title game. During his senior season, Concordia once again reached the NAIA championship game.

== Coaching career ==
Victor began his coaching career as an assistant under Rick Croy at Citrus College in 2005, leading his team to 17 wins in his only season. Victor became an assistant at Concordia–Irvine in 2006 and helped the team to a 119–22 record. The team won three out of four Golden State Athletic Conference Championships and reached the NAIA championship game in 2007. Victor was hired as head coach at Citrus College in 2010. In his first season, he led the team to a 27–6 record and helped the team reach the CCCAA State Regional Finals. Victor served as head coach of Citrus College from 2010 to 2015, compiling a 103–39 record. In June 2015, he joined Eastern Washington as an assistant under Jim Hayford. Hayford was hired as head coach of Seattle in 2017, with Victor named as assistant coach. Over four seasons, Victor contributed to the team achieving a 64–55 record.

Hayford was placed on administrative leave on November 5, 2021, following an investigation that revealed he had used racial slurs. Victor coached the Redhawks as they opened their season with a 69–66 win over Alcorn State. On November 11, Hayford officially resigned and Victor was named interim head coach. On March 1, 2022, Victor's status as interim head coach was rescinded, and he was officially named Seattle's head coach.

== Head coaching record ==
=== Junior college ===
Record table
Season	Team	Overall	Conference	Standing	Postseason
Citrus Owls (Western State Conference) (2010–2015)
2010–11	Citrus	27–6	9–3		
2011–12	Citrus	28–2	12–0		
2012–13	Citrus	16–11	6–4		
2013–14	Citrus	16–9	8–4		
2014–15	Citrus	16–11	9–5		
Citrus:		103–39 (.725)	44–16 (.733)		
Total:		103–39 (.725)			
National champion Postseason invitational champion Conference regular season champion Conference regular season and conference tournament champion Division regular season champion Division regular season and conference tournament champion Conference tournament champion

=== College ===
Record table
Season	Team	Overall	Conference	Standing	Postseason
Seattle Redhawks (Western Athletic Conference) (2021–2025)
2021–22	Seattle	23–9	14–4	T–1st	
2022–23	Seattle	20–12	11–7	T–4th	
2023–24	Seattle	23–14	11–9	T–4th	CBI Champions
2024–25	Seattle	14–18	8–8	T–5th	
Seattle Redhawks (West Coast Conference) (2025–present)
2025–26	Seattle	21–14	8–10	T–5th	NIT Second Round
2026–27	Seattle	0–0	0–0		
Seattle:		101–67 (.601)	52–38 (.578)		
Total:		101–67 (.601)			
National champion Postseason invitational champion Conference regular season champion Conference regular season and conference tournament champion Division regular season champion Division regular season and conference tournament champion Conference tournament champion
