= Ronn McMahon =

American-Canadian basketball player

Personal information
- Born: May 29, 1965 (age 61) Provo, Utah, U.S.
- Listed height: 5 ft 9 in (1.75 m)
- Listed weight: 161 lb (73 kg)

Career information
- High school: Upland (Upland, California)
- College: Salt Lake CC (1985–1987); Eastern Washington (1987–1990)
- NBA draft: 1987: undrafted
- Playing career: 1991–199?
- Position: Point guard
- Number: 10

Career history
- 1991–1992: Yakima Sun Kings

Career highlights
- NCAA steals leader (1990); First-team All-Big Sky (1990)

Ronn McMahon (born May 29, 1965) is a former Canadian national men's basketball team player, but he was in fact born in Provo, Utah in the United States. While playing in college at Eastern Washington University, McMahon

A point guard, McMahon ended his collegiate career with Eastern Washington University men's basketball's second best steals getter, with a 3.52 average per game, 225 over his 3-year career, an average that trails only Mookie Blaylock's 3.8. McMahon's nine steals during a December 15, 1988 game against Portland State is his school's all-time record. He was named to the Big Sky all-conference first-team for 1989–90.

McMahon was Canada's starting point guard at the 1994 FIBA World Championship as well as the 1992 FIBA Tournament of the Americas. They finished 7th and 5th respectively in these tournaments.

He played professionally in 1991–92 with the Yakima Sun Kings of the Continental Basketball Association. McMahon now lives in Tacoma, Washington with his family and works for the YMCA.
