= Martin Seiferth =

German basketball player (born 1990)

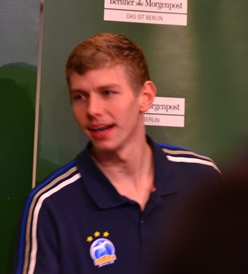

Personal information
- Born: 18 September 1990 (age 34); Berlin, Germany
- Listed height: 2.08 m (6 ft 10 in)
- Listed weight: 229 lb (104 kg)

Career information
- College: Oregon (2010–2011); Eastern Washington (2012–2014)
- NBA draft: 2014: undrafted
- Playing career: 2014–present
- Position: Center

Career history
- 2014–2015: ALBA Berlin
- 2015–2017: Chemnitz 99
- 2017–2018: MLP Academics Heidelberg
- 2018–2020: Paderborn Baskets

Martin Seiferth (born 18 September 1990) is a retired German professional basketball player who played until 2020 for the Paderborn Baskets of the German ProA league. He formerly played for Alba Berlin of the German Basketball League. Prior to his professional career, Seiferth played with the Oregon and Eastern Washington men's basketball teams. He commonly plays the role as a forward-center, transforming into an elite shot-blocker in the Big Sky Conference. Seiferth redshirted his sophomore year in college due to NCAA transfer rules.

The first club he competed with was Marzahner Basket Bären, joining in 2006. Seiferth helped the Alba Berlin youth team win the Nachwuchs Basketball Bundesliga League (NBBL) in the 2008–09 season after finishing as runners-up at the conclusion of the team's preceding year.
