= Laguna Blanca School =

Private school in California, US

Coordinates: 34.42231°N 119.76226°W

- 4125 Paloma Drive Santa Barbara, CA 93110

Information
- Other name: LBS
- Type: Private, Coeducational, Day School, Grades EK-12
- Established: 1933
- Head of school: Ron Cino
- Grades: K-12
- Colors: Blue and White
- Mascot: Owls
- Website: www.lagunablanca.org

Laguna Blanca School is a private school located on two different campuses, in Santa Barbara and nearby Montecito, California.

Founded in 1933, Laguna Blanca is an independent, co-educational, college-preparatory day school for students in grades K-12 in Santa Barbara.

== History ==
The land in Hope Ranch was made available by Harold Chase for the establishment of a school—Edward Selden Spaulding and three of his colleagues from the Deane School founded Laguna Blanca School in 1933. With Mr. Spaulding as the first headmaster, the School opened its doors to 45 young men and graduated its first official class four years later in 1937. To keep pace with increasing enrollment, the School added new buildings, classrooms, and science labs, growing from a 6-acre (24,000 m^{2}) campus to the approximate 35 acres (140,000 m^{2}) that houses the school today. In 1942, Laguna became coeducational, and in 1957, the School added a kindergarten to elementary and secondary classes.

The year 2000 proved pivotal in the history of Laguna Blanca with the acquisition of a new Lower School site in Montecito. Grades K-4 are located on the Montecito campus, while the rest are located on the main campus.
