= Tyler Harvey (basketball) =

American-Australian basketball player (born 1993)

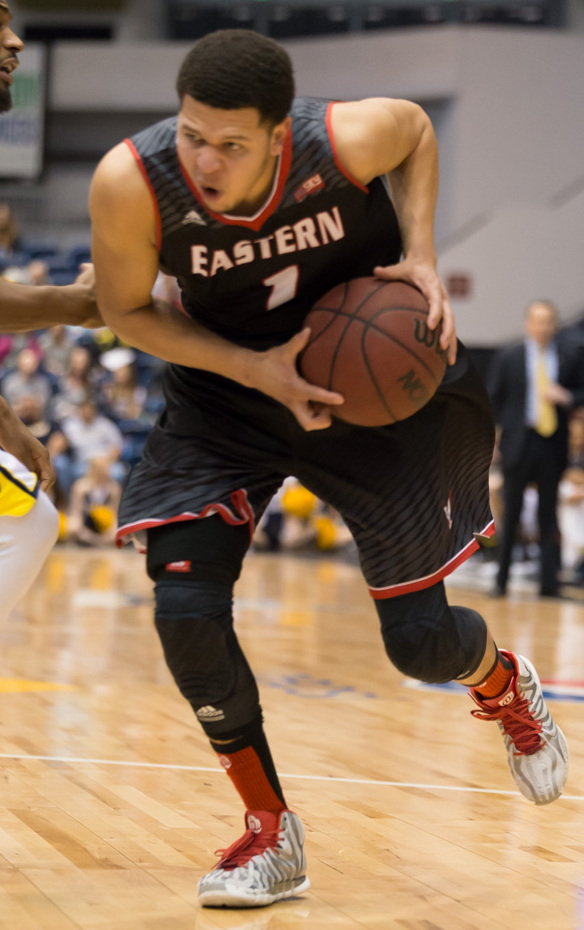
- Harvey with Eastern Washington in 2015

No. 1 – Illawarra Hawks
- Position: Point guard / shooting guard
- League: NBL

Personal information
- Born: July 17, 1993 (age 33) Torrance, California, U.S.
- Listed height: 6 ft 4 in (1.93 m)
- Listed weight: 185 lb (84 kg)

Career information
- High school: Bishop Montgomery (Torrance, California)
- College: Eastern Washington (2012–2015)
- NBA draft: 2015: 2nd round, 51st overall pick
- Drafted by: Orlando Magic
- Playing career: 2015–present

Career history
- 2015–2016: Erie BayHawks
- 2016–2017: FIAT Torino
- 2017–2018: Antibes Sharks
- 2018–2019: Memphis Hustle
- 2019–2020: Ratiopharm Ulm
- 2020–present: Illawarra Hawks
- 2024: Cangrejeros de Santurce
- 2025: Shanghai Sharks
- 2026: Liaoning Flying Leopards

Career highlights
- NBL champion (2025); 2× All-NBL First Team (2021, 2025); Honorable mention All-American – AP (2015); NCAA scoring champion (2015); 2× First-team All-Big Sky (2014, 2015); First-team Academic All-American (2015)
- Stats at Basketball Reference

Tyler Jordon Harvey (born July 17, 1993) is an American-Australian professional basketball player for the Illawarra Hawks of the National Basketball League (NBL). He played college basketball for the Eastern Washington Eagles, where he led Division I in scoring as a junior. He primarily plays as a point guard or a shooting guard.

== College career ==
Harvey graduated from Bishop Montgomery High School of Torrance, California, in 2011.

According to Eastern Washington Eagles head coach at the time Jim Hayford, Harvey was the player the team was "building their basketball program on," as a sophomore.

As a junior, Harvey led Eastern Washington to Division I school-record 26 wins and a share of the Big Sky Conference regular season title, the Big Sky tournament title, and a spot in the 2015 NCAA Tournament. The Eagles received a thirteen seed and played fourth seed Georgetown in the second round of the tournament. The Eagles fell to the Hoyas, 74–84, ending their season.

Harvey finished the season as the Division I national scoring leader at 23.1 points per game. Harvey also led the nation in three-point shots made as well. Harvey would earn Honorable Mention All-American honors by the Associated Press, the first Eastern Washington player to do so since Rodney Stuckey in 2007. Harvey would be named to the Big Sky Conference first-team for the second-straight year. He was also named a first-team Academic All-American, and was also named to the Lou Henson Mid-Major All-American Team.

On April 1, 2015, Harvey announced his decision to forgo his final season at Eastern Washington and declared for the 2015 NBA draft.

== Professional career ==
=== Erie BayHawks (2015) ===
On June 25, 2015, Harvey was selected with the 51st overall pick in the 2015 NBA draft by the Orlando Magic. He later joined the Magic blue team for the 2015 NBA Summer League. On October 31, 2015, he was acquired by the Erie BayHawks of the NBA Development League, the affiliate team of the Magic. On November 20, he made his professional debut in a 103–93 loss to the Delaware 87ers, recording 9 points, 1 rebounds, two assists and two steals in 29 minutes. On December 30, the Bayhawks trailed by 21 points with 4 minutes and 23 seconds. Over those 4 minutes and 23 seconds, Harvey proceeded to sink six straight threes, teaming with fellow guard John Jordan to send the game to overtime. The Bayhawks ended up winning the game, 125–120.

=== Auxilium Pallacanestro Torino (2016–2017) ===
On July 22, 2016, Harvey signed with FIAT Torino of the Italian Serie A.

=== Olympique Antibes (2017–2018) ===
On August 16, 2017, Harvey signed with Olympique Antibes of LNB Pro A.

=== Memphis Hustle (2018–2019) ===
On July 23, 2018, the Magic traded Harvey's NBA rights, alongside Dakari Johnson to the Memphis Grizzlies for Jarell Martin and cash considerations. For the 2018–19 season, Harvey was added to the roster of the Grizzlies’ G League affiliate, the Memphis Hustle. On February 2, 2019, Harvey converted 13 3-point shots, tying the NBA G League single-game record established by Brady Heslip on November 29, 2014, that continued to stand As of March 3, 2022.

=== Ratiopharm Ulm (2019–2020) ===
On July 19, 2019, Harvey signed with Ratiopharm Ulm of the Basketball Bundesliga.

=== Illawarra Hawks / Cangrejeros de Santurce / China (2020–present) ===
On July 28, 2020, Harvey signed a one-year deal with the Illawarra Hawks of the Australian National Basketball League (NBL). He averaged 20.4 points, 3.7 rebounds, 3.2 assists and 1.4 steals per game during the 2020–21 season while shooting 38% from beyond the three-point line. He was subsequently named to the All-NBL First Team.

On July 9, 2021, Harvey re-signed with the Hawks on a three-year deal.

In 33 games in the 2023–24 NBL season, Harvey averaged 15.1 points per game on 40 per cent shooting from the field. Following the NBL season, he joined Cangrejeros de Santurce of the Baloncesto Superior Nacional.

On May 9, 2024, Harvey re-signed with the Hawks on a three-year deal. He was named to the All-NBL First Team for the second time in his career in the 2024–25 season, helping the Hawks finish on top of the regular-season ladder.

On March 28, 2025, Harvey signed with the Shanghai Sharks of the Chinese Basketball Association (CBA) for the remainder of the 2024–25 season.

In the 2025–26 NBL season, Harvey averaged 16.9 points and 3.6 assists per game while shooting 38.9% from 3-point range. Following the NBL season, he joined the Liaoning Flying Leopards for the rest of the 2025–26 CBA season.

On April 13, 2026, the Hawks exercised the third year option on his three-year contract, securing him for the 2026–27 NBL season.

=== Draft rights ===
On June 25, 2015, Harvey was selected with the 51st overall pick in the 2015 NBA draft by the Orlando Magic.

On July 23, 2018, the Magic traded Harvey's NBA rights, alongside Dakari Johnson to the Memphis Grizzlies for Jarell Martin and cash considerations.

On August 7, 2021, Harvey's NBA rights were traded to the Charlotte Hornets.

== Personal life ==
Harvey met his wife, Haley Stading, at Eastern Washington University where she was a player on the women's soccer team. The two married in July 2019. They have a son who was born in March 2023.

Harvey and his family appeared on two episodes of Family Feud in May 2023.

In February 2026, Harvey was granted Australian permanent residency. His Australian citizenship application was approved in July 2026, and on August 29, 2026, Harvey officially became an Australian citizen in an induction ceremony.

== See also ==
- List of NCAA Division I men's basketball season scoring leaders
- List of NCAA Division I men's basketball season 3-point field goal leaders
