= Alvin Snow =

American basketball player (born 1981)

Personal information
- Born: October 30, 1981 (age 45) Renton, Washington
- Listed height: 6 ft 2 in (1.88 m)
- Listed weight: 215 lb (98 kg)

Career information
- High school: Franklin (Seattle, Washington)
- College: Eastern Washington (2000–2004)
- NBA draft: 2004: undrafted
- Playing career: 2004–2014
- Position: Guard

Career history
- 2005: Njarðvík
- 2005: Bellevue Blackhawks
- 2005–2006: Ironi Ashkelon
- 2006: APOEL Nicosia
- 2006–2007: TBB Trier
- 2007: Pınar Karşıyaka
- 2007–2008: SKK Kotwica Kołobrzeg
- 2008–2010: Helios Domžale
- 2010–2011: Medical Park Trabzonspor
- 2011–2012: Kryvbasbasket
- 2012: Royal Halı Gaziantep
- 2012: Washington Rampage
- 2013: Sigal Prishtina
- 2014: Seattle Flight

Career highlights
- Big Sky Player of the Year (2004); Big Sky Defensive Player of the Year (2002); 3× First-team All-Big Sky (2002–2004)

Alvin Eugene Snow Jr. (born October 30, 1981) is an American former professional basketball player. Snow is also a 2 time Hall of Fame inductee (Franklin High School and Eastern Washington University).

== Professional career ==
Snow signed with Úrvalsdeild karla club Njarðvík in March 2005, along with Doug Wrenn, replacing Americans Anthony Lackey and Matt Sayman. He appeared in two playoff games for Njarðvík against ÍR, averaging 20.5 points, 6.5 rebounds and 10.0 assists in the 0-2 series loss.
