= Box Hill High School =

Location
- Box Hill, VIC; Australia; 37°49′13″S 145°8′15″E

Information
- Type: Public school
- Motto: Latin: Ad Altiora Certamus (We Strive For Higher Things)
- Established: 1930
- Principal: Kellie Ind
- Enrolment: 1,479 (as of 2023)
- Colours: Navy, gold, white
- Website: http://www.boxhillhs.vic.edu.au

Box Hill High School is a co-educational public secondary school located on the corner of Middleborough Road and Whitehorse Road in the eastern suburb of Box Hill in Melbourne, Victoria, Australia.

With an enrolment of 1,547 students (as of 2025), it caters for students from years 7 through to 12. Year 10, 11 and 12 students undertake the VCE program.

Its school zone includes the suburbs of Box Hill, Box Hill South, Burwood, Burwood East, Blackburn, Blackburn North, and Blackburn South.

== History ==
Established in 1930 as a single-sex boys school, Box Hill High School is now a co-educational school. In 2007–2009, a large upgrade of the facilities was funded by the Victorian State Government, with a number of new classrooms completed by mid-2021, as well as being awarded another $500,000 by the Victorian State Government to refurbish staff and student toilets.

== Academics ==
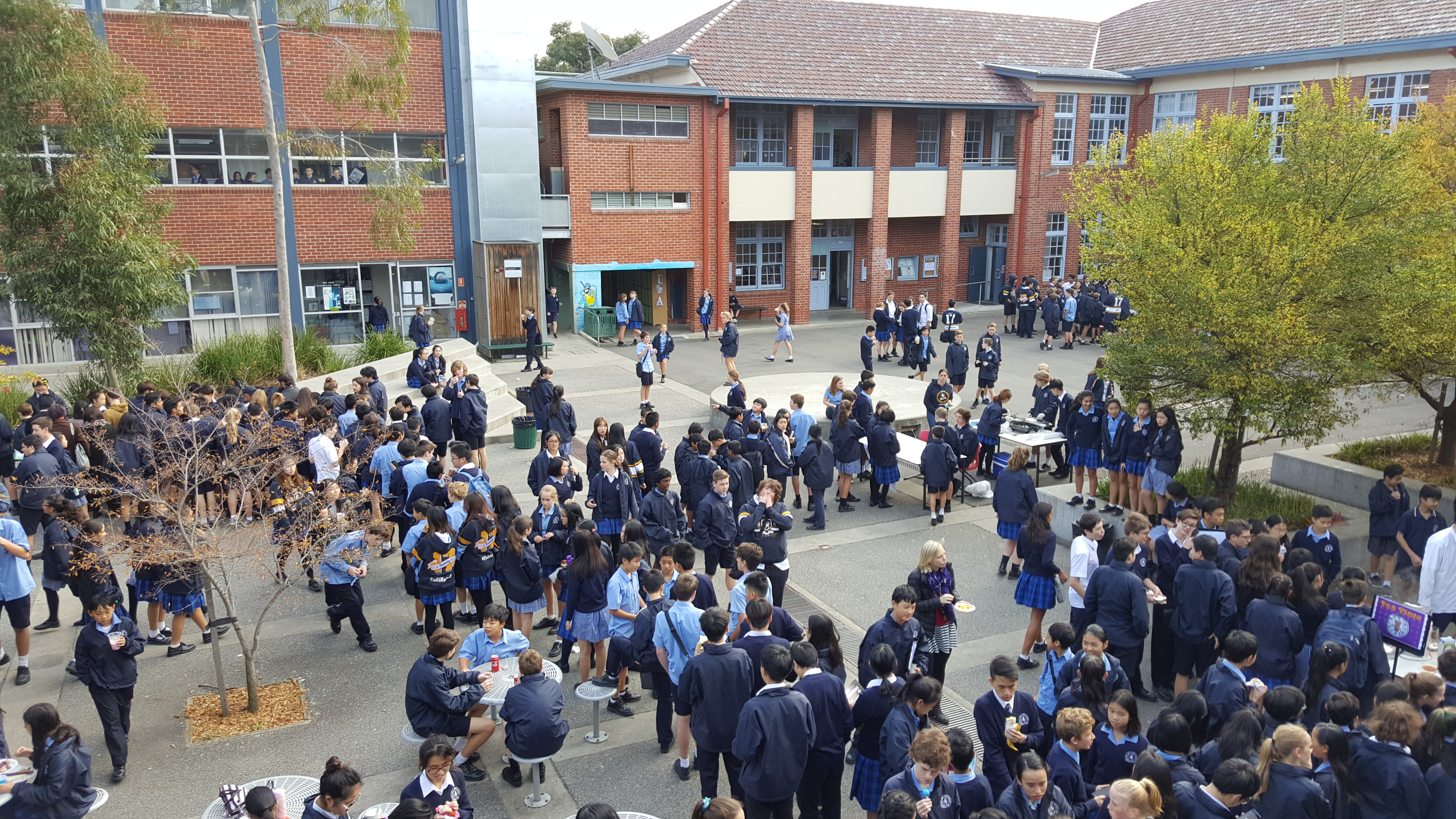
Box Hill High School Campus

Box Hill High School was ranked in the top 200 public secondary schools (equal 3rd) in Australia based on academic results in 2009.

In 2014, the Victorian Certificate of Education median study score was 33. 12.3% percent of students achieved over 40 study scores.

Box Hill High School was ranked ninth out of all state secondary schools in Victoria based on VCE results in 2018.

Box Hill High School was one of 40 government schools in Victoria that ran the Select Entry Accelerated Learning Program (SEAL), until the program was ended state-wide by the Victorian Department of Education in 2016.

== Notable alumni ==
- Graeme Base – author and picture book artist
- Ian Browne – cyclist
- John Brack - Painter
- Peter Cawthorn – tennis player
- George Cox – politician
- Bob Greig – politician
- Venky Jois – basketballer
- Tony Lamb – politician
- Jordan Ridley – AFL footballer
- John Sangster – musician
- Frank Sedgman – tennis player
- Reuben Solo - comedian

== Notable staff ==
- George Furner Langley – soldier
- Bill Woodfull – cricketer
