= The Basketball Classic =

American college basketball tournament

- Sport: Basketball
- Founded: 2022
- Founder: CollegeInsider.com (under their anti-racism organization's name "Eracism")
- First season: 2021–22
- Folded: 2022
- No. of teams: 32
- Country: United States
- Last champion: Fresno State
- Most titles: Fresno State (1)
- Broadcaster: ESPN+
- Related competitions: NCAA Division I men's basketball tournament National Invitational Tournament; College Basketball Invitational
- Website: Website

The Basketball Classic presented by Eracism was a single-elimination, fully-bracketed men's college basketball postseason tournament created in 2022 as a successor to the CollegeInsider.com Postseason Tournament after its scheduled 2020 and 2021 tournaments were cancelled because of the COVID-19 pandemic. The tournament featured up to 32 National Collegiate Athletic Association (NCAA) Division I teams not selected to participate in the NCAA Division I men's basketball tournament, the NIT, or the College Basketball Invitational. All games were streamed on ESPN+. In lieu of a traditional bracket, The Basketball Classic used the old NIT model in which the matchups were set after each round.

== Format ==
The tournament consisted of three rounds, single elimination, the games were held on campuses of participating schools. All gate receipts were collected by The Basketball Classic. Schools could host games in the tournament without the responsibility of an additional financial commitment.

== Broadcast ==
Year	Network	Play-by-Play	Color analyst	Sideline
2022	ESPN+	Noah Frary	Nate Ross	

== Champion ==
Year	Champion	Runner-up	MVP
2022	Fresno State	Coastal Carolina	Orlando Robinson
