= Mason Peatling =

Australian basketball player (born 1997)

No. 22 – Illawarra Hawks
- Position: Power forward
- League: NBL

Personal information
- Born: 31 March 1997 (age 29)
- Listed height: 203 cm (6 ft 8 in)
- Listed weight: 105 kg (231 lb)

Career information
- High school: Beaconhills College (Melbourne, Victoria)
- College: Eastern Washington (2016–2020)
- NBA draft: 2020: undrafted
- Playing career: 2015–present

Career history
- 2015–2016: Dandenong Rangers
- 2020–2023: Melbourne United
- 2021–2023: Knox Raiders
- 2023–present: Illawarra Hawks
- 2024–2025: Dandenong Rangers
- 2026: Illawarra Hawks (NBL1 East)

Career highlights
- 2× NBL champion (2021, 2025); NBL1 South champion (2023); Big Sky Player of the Year (2020); First-team All-Big Sky (2020); Second-team All-Big Sky (2019); First-team Academic All-American (2020)

Mason Peatling (born 31 March 1997) is an Australian professional basketball player for the Illawarra Hawks of the National Basketball League (NBL). He played college basketball for the Eastern Washington Eagles.

== Early life ==
Peatling attended Beaconhills College in Melbourne, Victoria. He represented Victoria Metro at the Under-20 Australian Junior Basketball Championships. He played for the Dandenong Rangers in the South East Australian Basketball League in 2015 and 2016.

== College career ==
Peatling signed with Eastern Washington in November 2015.

Peatling averaged 4 points and three rebounds per game as a freshman. He improved his averages to 7.7 points and 5.6 rebounds per game as a sophomore. As a junior, Peatling averaged 15.5 points and 7.5 rebounds per game. He was named to the Second Team All-Big Sky. On 13 December 2019, he scored a Big Sky-record 54 points and had 13 rebounds during a 146-89 win over Multnomah University. Peatling was named Big Sky Player of the Year as a senior. He averaged 17.2 points and 9.1 rebounds per game as the Eagles' second-leading scorer behind Jacob Davison.

== Professional career ==
=== Melbourne United and Knox Raiders (2020–2023) ===
On 24 July 2020, Peatling signed a three-year deal with Melbourne United of the National Basketball League (NBL), with the first season as a development player.

Peatling played for the Knox Raiders of the NBL1 South in 2021, 2022 and 2023. He helped the Raiders win the 2023 NBL1 South championship.

=== Illawarra Hawks and Dandenong Rangers (2023–present) ===
On 5 April 2023, Peatling signed a two-year deal with the Illawarra Hawks. Following the 2023–24 NBL season, he joined the Dandenong Rangers of the NBL1 South for the 2024 season.

Peatling was a starter for the Hawks in the 2024–25 NBL season and helped the team win the NBL championship. He re-joined the Rangers for the 2025 NBL1 South season.

On 1 April 2025, Peatling re-signed with the Hawks in a two-year deal.

Peatling joined the Illawarra Hawks NBL1 team of the NBL1 East for the 2026 NBL1 season.

On 9 October 2026, Peatling was ruled out for the rest of the 2026–27 NBL season after requiring season-ending foot surgery.

== Personal life ==
Peatling earned his finance degree in under four years at Eastern Washington. He married Laura Burdack, who also played club basketball, in 2016. Her brother Blake was a teammate of Peatling on a travelling club team.
