= Todd Beamer High School =

High school in Washington, US

Location
- 35999 16th Ave S Federal Way, Washington 98003; United States; 47°16′40″N 122°18′55″W

Information
- Type: Public Secondary
- Established: 2003
- School district: Federal Way School District
- Principal: Travis Savala
- Teaching staff: 67.77 (FTE)
- Grades: 9–12
- Enrollment: 1,413 (2023–2024)
- Student to teacher ratio: 20.85
- Campus: Suburban
- Color
- Mascot: Titan
- Website: tbhs.fwps.org
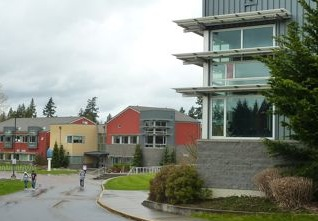

Todd Beamer High School is a four-year secondary school located in Federal Way, Washington, within the Federal Way School District. The school was built in 2003 and was named after Todd Beamer, one of several passengers aboard United Airlines Flight 93 during the September 11, 2001 attacks who attempted to foil the hijacking and reclaim the aircraft, which crashed into a field near Shanksville, Pennsylvania. The school was opened in September 2003.

Todd Beamer Campus received a $675,000 grant from the Bill & Melinda Gates Foundation for staff development during the school's first three years.

== Academics ==
The school has three separate academies as of 2012, each named for one of the school colors and with its own choice of teachers and electives. The three academies are the Blue Academy (previously Puget Sound Business and Industry Academy); Green Academy (previously the Math, Science, Health and Fitness Academy); and Silver Academy (previously the School of Global Leadership & Economics).

A fourth academy, the Northwest College Preparatory Academy, was created in 2005, but was merged with the other three academies in 2009 due to budget and teacher cuts.

== Athletics ==
Todd Beamer's sports teams are called the Titans and compete in the Olympic Division of the North Puget Sound League. Todd Beamer's men's soccer team won the 4A State Championship in 2017, with an astounding 19–1–1 record, beating Pasco 2–1, in the 4A State Championship. The soccer 4A title was the School's first State title in any sport, in their history since its opening in September 2003.

== Incidents ==
=== Gun scare ===
TBHS made national news as a student brought three guns to school on April 19, 2007, just three days after the Virginia Tech shooting. The school was put into a lockdown for an hour.

Another lockdown occurred in 2013 when two seniors allegedly threatened a bus driver with fake guns during the 2012–2013 school year. Once again, the school remained in a lockdown for one hour.

=== PETA ===
After a Todd Beamer High School student followed up a campaign promise by swallowing a live goldfish, People for the Ethical Treatment of Animals (PETA) criticised the school. PETA felt that "people who harm small animals, often go on to harm larger animals or even people." The incident made statewide news, and eventually onto national news. Radio talk shows hosts such as Howard Stern suggested that the incident was blown out of proportion.

=== Bathroom fires ===
In December 2008, TBHS was subjected to 3 consecutive days of repeated arson in several of the school's bathrooms. It began on Monday, December 8, where a purposeful fire was created in a bathroom's trash can. This also occurred the next day, December 9; and the day after, December 10. All students were safely evacuated each day and none were injured. Principal Liz Drake made announcements throughout the week over the intercom to keep students calm. The school received some minor repairable damages from the incident. The students responsible for the fires were caught and dealt with by the police. This event led to the installation of security cameras in Beamer's hallways.

== Facilities ==
The building was designed as an assemblage of structures around a central courtyard, similar to a village, to reinforce more personalized smaller groupings and recall the historic rural settlement patterns of the area. Learning spaces were designed to be highly flexible and convertible to accommodate changing methodologies and technology. The project was designed by Bassetti Architects to accommodate an easy conversion of the school into departmental-, academy-, grade-, or project-based learning models. The innovative design was recognized as a finalist for the James D. MacConnell Award by the Association for Learning Environments in 2004.
