= Beaconhills College =

Australian independent, co-educational, school

Location
- Berwick & Pakenham, Victoria; Australia; 38°3′39″S 145°28′9″E

Information
- Type: Independent, co-educational, day school
- Motto: Latin: Lux Luceat (Let Your Light So Shine)
- Denomination: Anglican, Uniting Church
- Established: 1982
- Chairman: Dr David Moseley
- Headmaster: Stephen McGinley
- Years offered: K–12
- Gender: Co-educational
- Enrolment: approx. 3000 (P–12)
- Colours: Navy blue & gold
- Slogan: Learning That Matters
- Website: www.beaconhills.vic.edu.au

Beaconhills College is a co-educational, ecumenical, independent school providing education from early learning to prep to year 12. The college has 2 campuses: One located in Pakenham, Victoria and one located in Berwick, Victoria, Australia, each campus with a co-located Little Beacons Learning Centre.

Beaconhills was established in 1982 by the Anglican and Uniting Churches to serve the education needs of the Christian community in the greater Pakenham area. The college celebrated its 40th anniversary in 2022.

== College history ==
The idea to establish a local, independent, Christian school was conceived by a group of parishioners at St. John's Anglican Church in Upper Beaconsfield in 1980. By March 1981 a steering committee had been established with John McConchie appointed as chairperson. The steering committee called a public meeting at the Pakenham Hall on 11 March 1981 where the proposal to establish an ecumenical, co-educational, low-fee secondary school was ratified in the presence of some 250 people.

In 1981, as the steering committee continued to hold public meetings seeking support for the new school, a 13-acre (53,000 m^{2}) site on Toomuc Valley Road, Pakenham was purchased and portable classrooms obtained from St. Catherine's School in Toorak, and Frank Millett was appointed as founding principal. On 3 February 1982, Beaconhills Christian College opened with 34 students and five staff. A dedication service was held at St. James Church on 28 March 1982. Frank Millet led the college as principal until 1988, by which time the college community had grown to include 388 students and a teaching staff of 30. John McConchie, having led the steering committee, was chairperson of the board until 1986.

== Campuses ==
Beaconhills College operates two campuses across Victoria, Australia.

The 18-hectare Pakenham campus opened in 1982. The boarding house is adjacent to the campus.

The Berwick campus opened in 2003. The 630-seat community performing arts auditorium, the Tony Sheumack Centre for Performing Arts, is located at the Berwick campus.

Both campuses have a performing arts auditorium, a human movement centre, outdoor multipurpose courts, sporting ovals, visual art studios, woodworking workshops, food technology kitchens, and computer laboratories for students.

== SEISA ==
Beaconhills has hosted multiple SEISA competitions across both campuses in soccer, softball, basketball, netball, hockey, theatre sports, public speaking, and debating.

== Co-curricular clubs ==
Beaconhills College offers more than 40 co-curricular clubs and outdoor experiences.

== Notable alumni ==
- Pippa Black – Actress
- Tom Bugg – AFL Footballer
- Matthew Buntine – AFL Footballer
- Callum Porter – AFL Footballer
- Cody Weightman- AFL player

== See also ==
- List of schools in Victoria
- List of high schools in Victoria
- Victorian Certificate of Education
