= Jacob Wiley =

American basketball player (born 1994)

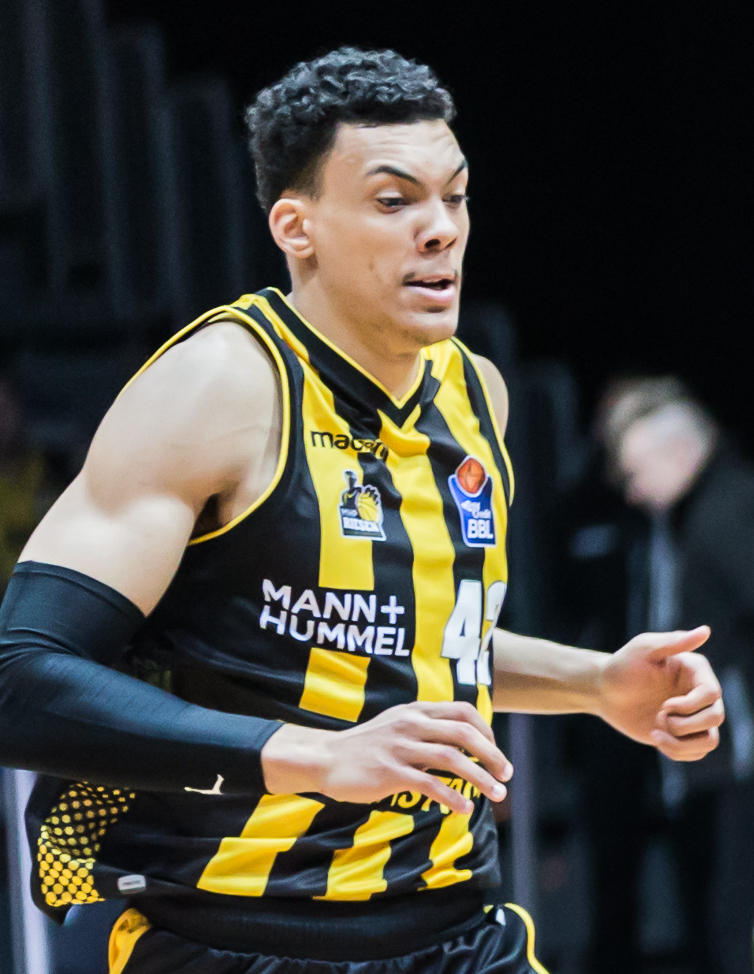
- Wiley with MHP Riesen Ludwigsburg in 2018

No. 31 – Ironi Ness Ziona
- Position: Power forward / center
- League: Israeli Basketball Premier League

Personal information
- Born: September 4, 1994 (age 32) Long Beach, California, U.S.
- Listed height: 6 ft 8 in (2.03 m)
- Listed weight: 220 lb (100 kg)

Career information
- High school: Newport (Newport, Washington)
- College: Montana (2012–2013); Lewis–Clark (2014–2016); Eastern Washington (2016–2017)
- NBA draft: 2017: undrafted
- Playing career: 2017–present

Career history
- 2017–2018: Brooklyn Nets
- 2017–2018: →Long Island Nets
- 2018: MHP Riesen Ludwigsburg
- 2018–2019: Adelaide 36ers
- 2019: Gran Canaria
- 2019–2020: Panathinaikos
- 2020–2021: Gran Canaria
- 2021: →Basket Zaragoza
- 2021: Budućnost
- 2022: Real Betis
- 2022–2023: Vaqueros de Bayamón
- 2022: Shiga Lakes
- 2023–2024: Adelaide 36ers
- 2024–2025: Covirán Granada
- 2025–2026: Rytas Vilnius
- 2026: Cangrejeros de Santurce
- 2026: Santeros de Aguada
- 2026–present: Ironi Ness Ziona

Career highlights
- BSN champion (2022); Greek League champion (2020); Adelaide 36ers Coaches Choice Award (2019); AP Honorable Mention All-American (2017); Big Sky Player of the Year (2017); First-team All-Big Sky (2017); First-team NAIA All-American (2016); Frontier Player of the Year (2016); 2× First-team All-Frontier (2015, 2016); Frontier Newcomer of the Year (2015)
- Stats at NBA.com
- Stats at Basketball Reference

Jacob Daniel Wiley (born September 4, 1994) is an American-born naturalized Macedonian professional basketball player for Ironi Ness Ziona of the Israeli Basketball Premier League.

He played college basketball for Montana, Lewis–Clark, and Eastern Washington. He was the 2016 Frontier Conference Player of the Year, and the 2017 Big Sky Conference Player of the Year. He played for the Brooklyn Nets in the NBA.

His international career includes winning league titles in Greece and Puerto Rico. He has played on the North Macedonia national team in international competition since obtaining citizenship in 2020.

== High school ==
Wiley grew up in the Long Beach, California area and attended Lakewood High School as a freshman, where he struggled academically and passed only one class. Ahead of his sophomore year, his father relocated him to Newport, Washington to live with his grandparents. Despite losing both his grandmother and his father during his junior year, Wiley improved his grade point average from 1.6 to 3.1 and graduated from Newport High School in 2012.

At Newport High School, Wiley earned four varsity letters in football, three in basketball, and one in track and field. Playing basketball, he averaged 26 points, 10 rebounds, and three blocks per game as a senior, earning All-State honors. In football, he earned All-State honors as a tight end. He also captained the track and field team, competing as a sprinter and winning the team's "Golden Spikes Award."

== College career ==
Wiley played college basketball for the Montana Grizzlies, Lewis–Clark State Warriors, and Eastern Washington Eagles. He primarily plays the forward position.

=== Montana Grizzlies ===
During his first and only year at Montana, in 20 games he averaged a very discouraging 0.9 points and 3.1 minutes per game, with zero assists and zero steals. This included his tying a team-high 5 points in a blowout 81–34 2013 NCAA tournament loss to Syracuse. He also competed on their track team after their NCAA Tournament season was over, before leaving Montana after his first basketball practice as a sophomore, discouraged to the point where he stopped playing the sport altogether from October 2013 to March 2014.

=== Lewis–Clark State ===
After that point, he started over his basketball career, transferring to Lewis–Clark State in the NAIA. In his first season at Lewis–Clark State in 2014–15, Wiley averaged 14.6 points, 7.3 rebounds, and 1.8 blocks per game while shooting 60.9% from the field (5th in the NAIA). He earned first-team All-Frontier Conference honors, was named Frontier Conference Newcomer of the Year, and received NAIA All-American honorable mention recognition.

During his junior year at Lewis–Clark State in 2015–16, Wiley averaged 14.9 points, 7.5 rebounds, and 1.4 blocks per game on 60.4% shooting (4th in the NAIA). He was named Frontier Conference Player of the Year, a First-Team NAIA All-American, and helped the program win its first-ever NAIA Tournament Championship game.

=== Eastern Washington ===
After that, he transferred to Eastern Washington to try and earn a master's degree, while also playing basketball. In 2016–17, during his only year at Eastern Washington, Wiley played 34 games (leading the conference) and averaging 34.3 minutes, 20.4 points (6th in the conference), 9.1 rebounds (leading the conference), 2.8 blocks (leading the conference, and 8th in the NCAA), and 2.4 assists per game (10rh) for the Eagles, while shooting 64.2% from the field (leading the conference, and 6th in the NCAA) and 82.8% from the free throw line (6th). He was named the 2017 Big Sky Conference Player of the Year, All-Big Sky First Team, AP Honorable Mention All-American, National Association of Basketball Coaches All-District (6) First Team, and Big Sky All-Tournament Team.

He also played in the 2017 Portsmouth Invitational Tournament. In three games in 27.2 minutes per game, he averaged 17.3 points, 9.3 rebounds, 1.3 assists, and 1.7 blocks per game, while shooting 53.8% from the field. He was named to the Portsmouth Invitational Tournament All-Tournament Team.

== Professional career ==
=== Brooklyn Nets / Long Island Nets (2017–2018) ===
After going undrafted in the 2017 NBA draft, Wiley played with the Brooklyn Nets during the 2017 NBA Summer League. He later signed a two-way contract with the Nets on August 14, 2017. Under the terms of the deal, he would split time with Brooklyn and their NBA G League affiliate, the Long Island Nets.

He made his NBA debut on October 29, 2017, playing four minutes and recording two rebounds in a 124–111 loss to the Denver Nuggets. On January 15, 2018, he was waived by the Nets. In five games with Brooklyn, Wiley recorded averages of 0.8 points, 2.2 rebounds and 0.4 assists in 6.7 minutes per game. He also appeared in 16 games with Long Island, averaging 7.8 points, 3.6 rebounds, and 1.1 assists in 20.6 minutes per contest, while shooting 46.3% from the field.

=== MHP Riesen Ludwigsburg (2018) ===
On March 4, 2018, Wiley signed with MHP Riesen Ludwigsburg of the Basketball Bundesliga. In 7 games he averaged 8.6 minutes, 4.9 points, and 1.4 rebounds per game, while shooting 59.1% from the floor.

=== Adelaide 36ers (2018–2019) ===
On August 1, 2018, after playing with the Dallas Mavericks during the 2018 NBA Summer League, Wiley signed with the Adelaide 36ers for the 2018–19 NBL season. In 28 games he averaged 22.5 minutes, 12.2 points, 5.0 rebounds, and 0.9 assists per game, while shooting 56.5% from the floor, and received the Adelaide 36ers Coaches Choice Award following the season.

After initially re-signing with Adelaide for another season, Wiley exercised his European out-clause in June 2019.

=== Gran Canaria (2019) ===
On February 20, 2019, Wiley signed with Spanish team Gran Canaria for the remainder of the 2018–19 season. He appeared in 21 games across all competitions, averaging 16.5 points and 5.2 rebounds per game in 14 Liga ACB games, and 10.0 points, 2.6 rebounds, and 1.0 blocks per game in 7 EuroLeague games.

=== Panathinaikos (2019–2020) ===
On July 16, 2019, Wiley signed a one-year contract with Greek Basket League champions Panathinaikos. In 44 games he averaged 13.7 minutes, 7.2 points, and 2.7 rebounds per game, while shooting 69.9% from the floor, while winning the 2020 Greek League championship.

=== Gran Canaria (2020–2021) ===
On July 14, 2020, Gran Canaria matched an offer made by Joventut Badalona, bringing back Wiley under the "tanteo" rules of the Liga ACB. Across 11 Liga ACB games with Gran Canaria during the 2020–21 season, he averaged 9.8 points and 3.8 rebounds, while adding 10.9 points and 6.0 rebounds across seven EuroCup games.

=== Basket Zaragoza (2021) ===
On February 26, 2021, Wiley went on loan to Basket Zaragoza for the remainder of the season.With Zaragoza, he averaged 10.4 points and 3.7 rebounds across 14 Liga ACB contests, as well as 13.6 points and 6.4 rebounds across nine Basketball Champions League games.

=== Budućnost (2021–2022) ===
On July 3, 2021, Wiley signed with Budućnost VOLI of the ABA League and the EuroCup. On December 3, 2021, following international duty with North Macedonia during the 2023 FIBA World Cup Qualifiers, he was suspended by the club after failing to report to practice and leaving Podgorica without permission due to a family issue. Prior to his suspension, Wiley averaged 10.8 points and 5.8 rebounds in five EuroCup games, as well as 4.7 points and 3.7 rebounds in seven ABA League appearances.

=== Real Betis (2022) ===
On February 4, 2022, Wiley signed with Real Betis of the Liga ACB. In 18 games he averaged 20.8 minutes, 10.2 points, and 4.8 rebounds per game, while shooting 57.9% from the floor.

=== Vaqueros de Bayamon and Shiga Lakestars (2022–2023) ===
For the 2022 BSN season, Wiley played for Vaqueros de Bayamón. In 15 games he averaged 24.1 minutes, 12.5 points, and 5.7 rebounds, 2.1 assists, and 1.3 blocks per game, while shooting 66.4% from the floor, and was a 2022 BSN champion.

Wiley played in a brief stint with Shiga Lakestars in Japan in October 2022, where he averaged 7.9 points, 5.9 rebounds, and 2.0 assists in seven B.League games.

Wiley returned to Vaqueros de Bayamón for the 2023 BSN season, averaging 13.8 points, 4.2 rebounds, and 1.3 assists ins 41 games.

=== Return to Adelaide (2023–2024) ===
On July 6, 2023, Wiley signed with the Adelaide 36ers for the 2023–24 NBL season, returning to the franchise for a second stint. Across 26 NBL games, he led the team in rebounding with 7.2 rebounds (4th in the league) per game while adding 10.5 points and 2.1 assists per game.

=== Covirán Granada (2024–2025) ===
On February 20, 2024, Wiley signed with Covirán Granada of the Liga ACB. During the remainder of the 2023–24 Liga ACB season, Wiley averaged 8.4 points, 5.5 rebounds, and 0.8 assists across 12 games for Covirán Granada. He shot 58.9% from the field while averaging 22.8 minutes per game.

He remained with the club into the 2024–25 season, averaging 8.3 points, 3.7 rebounds, and 1.1 assists in 19 Liga ACB games before leaving the team on March 19, 2025.

=== Rytas Vilnius (2025–2026) ===
On August 8, 2025, Wiley signed with Rytas Vilnius of the Lithuanian Basketball League and the Basketball Champions League. After he suffered what appeared to be a knee injury during a February 7, 2026 LKL game in Jonava, Rytas's medical staff did not find severe structural damage, which prompted Wiley to travel to the United States with the team's permission for a second opinion, resulting in him missing playing in the King Mindaugas Cup (KMT) Final Four; the team won the semi-final, and then lost in the finals.

Following contract termination discussions initiated by his agent on March 3, Rytas Vilnius announced on March 6, 2026, that Wiley had left the club by mutual agreement; Wiley in 2025-26 had averaged 8.9 points, 5.1 rebounds, and 1.6 assists across 17 Lithuanian Basketball League (LKL) games, and 7.3 points, 5.8 rebounds, and 0.9 assists in 9 Basketball Champions League (BCL) games.

Subsequent medical examinations in Puerto Rico later determined Wiley had been playing through a herniated lumbar disc and a torn hip labrum, and his knee pain had been a secondary reaction to what was happening in his hip and lower back.

=== Santeros de Aguada (2026) ===
Wiley then played for Santeros de Aguada of the Baloncesto Superior Nacional in Puerto Rico in 2026, after signing with them on April 24, 2026. In 42 games he averaged 25.8 minutes, 12.5 points, 6.5 rebounds, 2.7 assists, and 1.0 steals per game, while shooting 55.1% from the floor.

=== Ironi Ness Ziona (2026-present) ===
In 2026-27. after signing with the team on July 17, 2026, he is playing for Ironi Ness Ziona of the Israeli Basketball Premier League.

== National team career ==
On November 12, 2020, Wiley became a citizen of North Macedonia and became eligible to play for the North Macedonia national team. On November 15, 2020, he was included in the preliminary squad for the EuroBasket 2021 qualifiers against Italy and Estonia.

Wiley made his senior international debut in February 2021 during the EuroBasket 2022 qualifying bubble, appearing in four games and leading North Macedonia with averages of 16.0 points, 7.5 rebounds, and 2.3 blocks per game. He subsequently represented North Macedonia across multiple qualification cycles, including the 2023 FIBA World Cup qualifiers, the 2027 FIBA World Cup European Pre-Qualifiers—where he averaged 21.3 points, 7.0 rebounds, and 2.8 assists over four games—and the EuroBasket 2029 Pre-Qualifiers.

== Career statistics ==
Legend
GP	Games played	GS	Games started	MPG	Minutes per game
FG%	Field-goal percentage	3P%	3-point field-goal percentage	FT%	Free-throw percentage
RPG	Rebounds per game	APG	Assists per game	SPG	Steals per game
BPG	Blocks per game	PPG	Points per game	PIR	Performance index rating
**Bold**	Career high

=== NBA ===
Year	Team	GP	GS	MPG	FG%	3P%	FT%	RPG	APG	SPG	BPG	PPG
2017–18	Brooklyn	5	0	6.6	.250	.500	.500	2.2	.4	.2	.0	.8
Career		5	0	6.6	.250	.500	.500	2.2	.4	.2	.0	.8

=== EuroLeague ===
Year	Team	GP	GS	MPG	FG%	3P%	FT%	RPG	APG	SPG	BPG	PPG	PIR
2018–19	Gran Canaria	7	3	21.3	.633	.000	.800	.6	2.6	.9	.3	10.0	9.1
Career		7	3	21.3	.633	.000	.800	.6	2.6	.9	.3	10.0	9.1

== Personal life ==
Wiley and his wife Brittany have two children, Layla and Aliya. Layla was born in Adelaide, Australia.
