= Jim Hayford =

American basketball coach

Biographical details
- Born: May 5, 1967 (age 59); Amherst, Ohio, U.S.
- Education: Azusa Pacific

Coaching career (HC unless noted)
- 1987: Contra Costa Christian HS
- 1988–1990: Berean Christian HS
- 1990–1999: Azusa Pacific (assistant)
- 1999–2001: Sioux Falls
- 2001–2011: Whitworth
- 2011–2017: Eastern Washington
- 2017–2021: Seattle

Head coaching record
- Overall: 424–230 (college)
- Tournaments: 8–6 (NCAA Division III); 0–1 (NCAA Division I); 1–3 (CBI); 0–1 (CIT)

Accomplishments and honors

Championships
- 5 NWC regular season (2003, 2007, 2008, 2010, 2011); 6 NWC tournament (2003, 2007–2011); Big Sky regular season (2015); Big Sky tournament (2015)

Awards
- 5× Northwest Conference Coach of the Year; Big Sky Co-Coach of the Year (2015)

Jim Hayford (born May 5, 1967) is an American college basketball head coach who most recently coached at Seattle University. He previously coached at Eastern Washington University and Division III Whitworth University where he won about 80 percent of his games. His career winning percentage ranks among the top 10 among all active NCAA Division III coaches at the time.

On November 11, 2021, Hayford resigned after it was reported that he had twice repeated racial slurs.

== Whitworth University ==
In addition to his success at coaching, Hayford compiled a record of 217-57 and a winning percentage of .792, eight 20-win seasons, six appearances in the NCAA Division III Tournament (including the last five consecutive seasons), five Northwest Conference championships, three NCAA DIII Sweet 16 appearances (2008, 2010, 2011) and one Elite Eight appearance (2011). He has earned five NWC Coach of the Year awards, West Region Coach of the Year in the 2009–10 and 2010-11 seasons.

== Eastern Washington ==
On March 29, 2011, Eastern Washington formally introduced Hayford as their head coach after 10 years at Whitworth. On June 13, 2014, Eastern Washington signed a five years extension to keep Hayford as head coach through the 2018-2019 season. On November 24, 2014, Hayford picked up his biggest win of his EWU coaching career and the men's basketball program by beating the Indiana Hoosiers on their homecourt, 88-86. The win snapped the Hoosiers 43 games non-conference home games winning streak, their first win against a Big Ten team and their first win against a crowd of 10,000+ fans. On March 14, 2015, Hayford led the Eagles to their second NCAA tournament appearance in school history with a 69-65 win over the Montana Grizzlies on their homecourt. Hayford and the Eagles played their second round match-up against the Georgetown Hoyas on March 19 in Portland at approximately 7 p.m. PST, where they lost 84-74.

== Seattle ==
On March 29, 2017, Jim Hayford was hired as the new men's basketball head coach at Seattle University to replace Cameron Dollar.

In his first year as head coach, Hayford compiled a 20–14 record, the Redhawks' first 20-win season since 2008 and first 20-win season in Division I play since the 1960s. The Redhawks fell to Central Arkansas in the first round of the 2018 CBI tournament. In his second year as head coach, Hayford compiled an 18–15 record, marking the Redhawks' first back-to-back 18+ win seasons since 2008–09 and 2009–10. The Redhawks fell to Presbyterian in the first round of the 2019 CIT tournament.

On November 11, 2021, Hayford resigned after it was reported that he had twice repeated racial slurs. Assistant coach Chris Victor was named interim head coach.

== Head coaching record ==
=== College ===
Record table
Season	Team	Overall	Conference	Standing	Postseason
Sioux Falls Cougars (South Dakota Intercollegiate Conference) (1999–2000)
1999–00	Sioux Falls	15–15			
Sioux Falls Cougars (Great Plains Athletic Conference) (2000–2001)
2000–01	Sioux Falls	22–12			
Sioux Falls:		37–27 (.578)			
Whitworth Pirates (Northwest Conference) (2001–2011)
2001–02	Whitworth	20–7	12–4	2nd	
2002–03	Whitworth	23–4	13–3	1st	NCAA Division III First Round
2003–04	Whitworth	19–6	12–4	2nd	
2004–05	Whitworth	13–11	9–7	4th	
2005–06	Whitworth	20–7	13–3	2nd	
2006–07	Whitworth	24–4	13–3	1st	NCAA Division III Second Round
2007–08	Whitworth	21–7	12–4	1st	NCAA Division III Sweet 16
2008–09	Whitworth	23–6	12–4	2nd	NCAA Division III First Round
2009–10	Whitworth	26–3	16–0	1st	NCAA Division III Sweet 16
2010–11	Whitworth	28–2	15–1	1st	NCAA Division III Elite Eight
Whitworth:		217–57 (.792)	127–33 (.794)		
Eastern Washington Eagles (Big Sky Conference) (2011–2017)
2011–12	Eastern Washington	15–17	8–8	4th	
2012–13	Eastern Washington	10–21	7–13	9th	
2013–14	Eastern Washington	15–16	10–10	7th	
2014–15	Eastern Washington	26–9	14–4	T–1st	NCAA Division I Round of 64
2015–16	Eastern Washington	18–16	10–8	T–5th	CBI Quarterfinal
2016–17	Eastern Washington	22–12	13–5	2nd	CBI First Round
Eastern Washington:		106–91 (.538)	62–48 (.564)		
Seattle Redhawks (Western Athletic Conference) (2017–2021)
2017–18	Seattle	20–14	8–6	4th	CBI First Round
2018–19	Seattle	18–15	6–10	T–7th	CIT First Round
2019–20	Seattle	14–15	7–7	T–5th	
2020–21	Seattle	12–11	4–5	5th	
Seattle:		64–55 (.538)	25–27 (.481)		
Total:		424–230 (.648)			
National champion Postseason invitational champion Conference regular season champion Conference regular season and conference tournament champion Division regular season champion Division regular season and conference tournament champion Conference tournament champion

He is currently working in Northern California as a middle school teacher in the SF Bay Area.
