= Venky Jois =

Australian basketball player (born 1993)

Free agent
- Position: Power forward / center

Personal information
- Born: 7 July 1993 (age 33) Melbourne, Victoria, Australia
- Listed height: 6 ft 8 in (2.03 m)
- Listed weight: 230 lb (104 kg)

Career information
- High school: Box Hill (Melbourne, Victoria)
- College: Eastern Washington (2012–2016)
- NBA draft: 2016: undrafted
- Playing career: 2011–present

Career history
- 2011–2012: Dandenong Rangers
- 2016–2017: Tartu Ülikooli
- 2017: Vrijednosnice Osijek
- 2018: Shiga Lakestars
- 2018: Rasta Vechta
- 2019: Melbourne United
- 2019: Super City Rangers
- 2019–2020: Memphis Hustle
- 2021: Pirot
- 2021: Cairns Taipans
- 2021: Dandenong Rangers
- 2021–2022: Helios Suns
- 2023: North-West Tasmania Thunder
- 2023–2024: NorthPort Batang Pier
- 2024: Sichuan Blue Whales
- 2024: NorthPort Batang Pier
- 2026: Changhua Pauian BLL

Career highlights
- 2× First-team All-Big Sky (2015, 2016); Big Sky Freshman of the Year (2013); SEABL Youth Player of the Year (2011)

Venkatesha Jois (born 7 July 1993) is an Australian professional basketball player who last played for Changhua Pauian BLL of the Taiwanese Super Basketball League. He played four years of college basketball for Eastern Washington before playing professionally in Estonia, Croatia, Japan, Germany, New Zealand, Serbia, Slovenia, and the Philippines. He has also played in the Australian National Basketball League (NBL).

== Early life ==
Jois was born in the Melbourne suburb of Upper Ferntree Gully to an Indian father and an Australian mother. He attended Box Hill High School, where he participated in basketball, swimming, soccer, Australian rules football, cross country and athletics. He graduated in 2011. In 2011 and 2012, he played in the SEABL for the Dandenong Rangers, winning SEABL Youth Player of the Year honours in his first season after averaging 9.3 points, 5.9 rebounds and 1.6 assists per game.

== College career ==
Jois played four years of college basketball for Eastern Washington, winning Big Sky Freshman of the Year honours in 2012–13. He also garnered All-Big Sky honorable mention accolades in his first two seasons. As a junior and senior, he earned first-team All-Big Sky honours. He also earned All-Tournament team honours after helping Eastern Washington win the 2015 Big Sky tournament. In said season, Jois led the Eagles in both rebounds and blocks, and was second on the team in scoring. As a result of them winning the Big Sky tournament, they were selected as a participant in the 2015 NCAA tournament. EWU was seeded as a #13 seed where they faced off against the #4 seeded Georgetown Hoyas in the first round, within the South Regional. Jois and the Eagles put up a valiant effort, but ultimately fell to Hoyas in a 10–point ballgame, 74–84, with Jois leading the team in rebounds and coming second in points.

In 122 career games, Jois made 120 starts and averaged 14.8 points, 8.3 rebounds, 2.3 assists, 1.0 steals and 2.0 blocks in 32.2 minutes per game.

== Professional career ==
Jois spent his first professional season in Estonia, playing for Tartu Ülikooli during the 2016–17 season. He then split the 2017–18 season between Vrijednosnice Osijek in Croatia and Shiga Lakestars in Japan. After starting the 2018–19 season in Germany with Rasta Vechta, he left in November 2018. On 26 January 2019, he signed with Melbourne United for the rest of the 2018–19 NBL season.

On 3 April 2019, Jois signed with the Super City Rangers for the 2019 New Zealand NBL season. On 2 June 2019, he suffered a severe hand injury in a game against the Southern Huskies. On 29 June 2019, he parted ways with the Rangers.

In October 2019, Jois joined the Memphis Hustle of the NBA G League. He missed two months with an undisclosed injury. Jois averaged 5.9 points and 3.9 rebounds in 12.3 minutes per game in 18 games.

In February 2021, Jois joined Pirot of the Basketball League of Serbia. In seven games, he averaged 10.0 points, 5.6 rebounds, 1.7 assists and 1.3 steals per game.

On 20 April 2021, Jois signed with the Cairns Taipans for the remainder of the 2020–21 NBL season. Following the NBL season, he joined the Dandenong Rangers of the NBL1 South for the 2021 NBL1 season.

In September 2021, Jois signed with the Helios Suns of Slovenian League.

In March 2023, Jois joined the North-West Tasmania Thunder for the 2023 NBL1 South season.

On October 19, 2023, Jois signed with the NorthPort Batang Pier of the Philippine Basketball Association (PBA) as the team's import for the 2023–24 PBA Commissioner's Cup.

In March 2024, Jois joined the Sichuan Blue Whales of the Chinese Basketball Association (CBA).

On August 22, 2024, Jois returned to the NorthPort Batang Pier to replace Taylor Johns as the team's import for the 2024 PBA Governors' Cup.

In March 2026, Jois joined Changhua Pauian BLL of the Taiwanese Super Basketball League.
