= Eastern Washington Eagles men's basketball =

2026–27 Eastern Washington Eagles men's basketball team
- University: Eastern Washington University
- Head coach: Dan Monson (3rd season)
- Location: Cheney, Washington
- Arena: Reese Court (capacity: 6,000)
- Conference: Big Sky
- Nickname: Eagles
- Colors: Red and white
- Student section: Flight Club

NCAA Division I tournament appearances
- 2004, 2015, 2021

Conference tournament champions
- 2004, 2015, 2021

Conference regular-season champions
- 2000, 2004, 2015, 2020, 2023, 2024

Uniforms
Home	Away	Alternate

The Eastern Washington Eagles men's basketball team represents Eastern Washington University in Cheney, Washington, United States. The school's team currently competes in the Big Sky Conference, of which it has been a member since 1987. The Eagles have appeared in the NCAA Division I men's basketball tournament three times, most recently in 2021.

== Key statistics ==
Overall
Years of basketball	109
First season	1903–04
Head coaches (all-time)	19
All Games
All-time record	1,408–1,205 (.539)
20+ win seasons	20 (1935, 1942, 1943, 1944, 1945, 1947, 1950, 1951, 1953, 1972, 1976, 1977, 1978, 1986, 2015, 2017, 2018, 2020, 2023, 2024)
30+ win seasons	1 (1946)
Conference Games
Conference Record	212–264 (.445)
Big Sky Conference regular season Championships	6 (2000, 2004, 2015, 2020, 2023, 2024)
Big Sky Conference Tournament Championships	3 (2004, 2015, 2021)
NCAA Tournament
NCAA Appearances	3
NCAA W-L record	0–3 (.000)
Sweet Sixteens	0
Elite Eights	0
Final Fours	0
National Invitational Tournament
NIT Appearances	2
NIT W-L record	1–2 (.333)
NIT championships	0
Accurate as of 04/21/2017

== Head coaches ==
Coach	Years	Record	Pct.
Unknown	1903–05, 1911–12	1–4	.200
N. E. Hinch	1905–06	3–6	.333
Paul Lienau	1906–09	16–10	.615
Albert Fertsch	1912–16	11–2	.846
Vin Eustis	1919–27	108–43	.715
A.C. Woodward	1927–30	26–29	.473
Bob Brumblay	1942–45	75–17	.815
Red Reese	1930–42, 1945–64	470–301	.610
Ernie McKie	1965–67	23–52	.307
Jerry Krause	1967–82, 1983–85	261–197	.570
Joe Folda	1982, 1985–87	42–42	.500
Bob Hofman	1987–90	32–54	.372
John Wade	1990–95	34–98	.258
Steve Aggers	1995–00	51–82	.383
Ray Giacoletti	2000–04	69–50	.580
Mike Burns	2004–07	38–49	.437
Kirk Earlywine	2007–11	42–78	.350
Jim Hayford	2011–17	106–91	.538
Shantay Legans	2017–2021	75–49	.605
David Riley	2021–2024	62–38	.620
Dan Monson	2024–present	0–0	–

== Postseason ==
=== NCAA tournament results ===
The Eagles have appeared in three NCAA tournaments, with a combined record of 0–3.

Year	Seed	Round	Opponent	Result
2004	15 E	Round of 64	(2) #4 Oklahoma State	L 56–75
2015	13 S	Round of 64	(4) #22 Georgetown	L 74–84
2021	14 W	Round of 64	(3) #11 Kansas	L 84–93

=== National Invitation Tournament results ===
The Eagles have appeared in two National Invitation Tournaments, with a combined record of 1-2.

Year	Round	Opponent	Result
2003	First Round	Wyoming	L 71–78
2023	First Round; Second Round	Washington State; Oklahoma State	W 81–74; L 60–71

=== College Basketball Invitational results ===
The Eagles have appeared in the College Basketball Invitational three times, with a combined record of 1–3.

Year	Round	Opponent	Result
2016	First Round; Quarterfinals	Pepperdine; Nevada	W 79–72; L 70–85
2017	First Round	Wyoming	L 81–91
2018	First Round	Utah Valley	L 65–87

=== The Basketball Classic results ===
The Eagles have appeared in The Basketball Classic one time. Their record is 0–1.

Year	Round	Opponent	Result
2022	First Round	Fresno State	L 74–83

=== NAIA tournament results ===
The Eagles appeared in the NAIA Tournament five times, with a combined record of 6–5.

Year	Round	Opponent	Result
1942	First Round	Southeastern Oklahoma State	L 33–43
1943	First Round; Second Round; Quarterfinals	Valparaiso; Saint Cloud State; Southeast Missouri State	W 45–42; W 54–41; L 51–57
1945	First Round	Doane	L 51–54
1946	First Round; Second Round; Quarterfinals	Louisiana Tech; Southeastern Oklahoma State; Pepperdine	W 66–44; W 45–37; L 42–46
1947	First Round; Second Round; Quarterfinals	Culver–Stockton; Dakota Wesleyan; Marshall	W 51–48; W 62–48; L 48–56

== NBA Draft selections ==
NBA Draft Selections (4)

#	Year	Round	Pick	Overall	Name	Team
1	1977	6	11	121	Ron Cox	Cleveland Cavaliers
2	2007	1	15	15	Rodney Stuckey	Detroit Pistons
3	2015	2	21	51	Tyler Harvey	Orlando Magic
4	2025	1	11	11	Cedric Coward (Note: Played his sophomore and junior seasons at Eastern Washington before transferring to Washington State for his senior season.)	Portland Trail Blazers

== Eagles playing in international leagues ==
- Tanner Groves (born 1999), in the Taiwan Professional Basketball League
- Tyler Harvey (born 1993), in the National Basketball League
- Jacob Wiley (born 1994), player in the Israeli Basketball Premier League

== Awards ==
Associated Press All-Americans

- Alvin Snow* – 2004
- Rodney Stuckey* – 2006, 2007
- Tyler Harvey* – 2015
- Jacob Wiley* – 2017
- Bogdan Bliznyuk* – 2018

(*) Denotes Honorable Mention

Big Sky Most Valuable Player

- Alvin Snow – 2004
- Rodney Stuckey – 2006
- Jacob Wiley – 2017
- Bogdan Bliznyuk – 2018
- Mason Peatling – 2020
- Tanner Groves – 2021
- Steele Venters – 2023

Big Sky Coach of the Year

- Steve Aggers – 1998, 2000
- Ray Giacoletti – 2004
- Jim Hayford – 2015
- Shantay Legans – 2020
- David Riley – 2023, 2024

Big Sky Defensive Player of the Year

- Alvin Snow – 2002
- Kim Aiken, Jr. – 2021

Big Sky Top Reserve of the Year

- Tyler Robertson – 2021

Big Sky Freshman of the Year

- Marc Axton – 2002
- Matt Nelson – 2004
- Rodney Stuckey – 2006
- Glen Dean – 2010
- Venky Jois – 2013
- Bogdan Bliznyuk – 2015
- LeJuan Watts – 2024

Source.

== Retired jerseys ==
Retired Jerseys
No.	Player	Year
3	Rodney Stuckey (2006–07)	2008
30	Ron Cox (1973–1977)	2014
