= 2017–18 Sacramento State Hornets men's basketball team =

American college basketball season

2017–18 Sacramento State Hornets men's basketball
- Conference: Big Sky Conference
- Record: 7–25 (4–14 Big Sky)
- Head coach: Brian Katz (10th season)
- Assistant coaches: Brandon Laird; Chris Walker; Nate Smith
- Home arena: Hornets Nest

2017–18 Big Sky men's basketball standings
	Conf.				Overall
Team	W		L	PCT	W		L	PCT
Montana †	16	–	2	.889	26	–	8	.765
Idaho	14	–	4	.778	22	–	9	.710
Weber State	13	–	5	.722	20	–	11	.645
Eastern Washington	13	–	5	.722	20	–	15	.571
Northern Colorado	11	–	7	.611	26	–	12	.684
Idaho State	9	–	9	.500	14	–	16	.467
Portland State	9	–	9	.500	20	–	14	.588
Montana State	6	–	12	.333	13	–	19	.406
North Dakota	6	–	12	.333	12	–	20	.375
Southern Utah	5	–	13	.278	13	–	19	.406
Sacramento State	4	–	14	.222	7	–	25	.219
Northern Arizona	2	–	16	.111	5	–	27	.156
† Conference tournament winner

The 2017–18 Sacramento State Hornets men's basketball team represented California State University, Sacramento during the 2017–18 NCAA Division I men's basketball season. The Hornets, led by 10th-year head coach Brian Katz, played their home games at the Hornets Nest in Sacramento, California, as members of the Big Sky Conference. They finished the season 7–25, 4–14 in Big Sky play to finish in 11th place. They lost in the first of the Big Sky tournament to Portland State

== Previous season ==
The Hornets finished the 2016–17 season 13–18, 9–9 in Big Sky play to finish in seventh place. As the No. 7 seed in the Big Sky tournament, they defeated Idaho State in the first round, before losing to Eastern Washington in the quarterfinals.

== Offseason ==
=== Departures ===
Name	Number	Pos.	Height	Weight	Year	Hometown	Reason for departure
Trevis Jackson	11	G	5'11"	171	Senior	Santa Monica, California	Graduated
Grant Dressler	12	G/F	6'6"	194	Sophomore	Las Vegas, Nevada	Transferred to Chaminade
Matt Battaglia	15	G	6'0"	180	Freshman	El Dorado Hills, California	Walk-on; Didn't return
Nick Hornsby	33	G/F	6'7"	235	Senior	Irvine, California	Graduated
Eric Stuteville	44	C	6'11"	256	Senior	Orangevale, California	Graduated

=== 2017 recruiting class ===
College recruiting information
Name	Hometown	School	Height	Weight	Commit date
Jamion Wright; PG	San Francisco	Mission High School	5 ft 11 in (1.80 m)	160 lb (73 kg)	
Jamion Wright; PG	Recruit ratings: Scout: Rivals: (0)				
Bryce Fowler; F/G	Avondale, Arizona	Agua Fria High School	6 ft 6 in (1.98 m)	195 lb (88 kg)	
Bryce Fowler; F/G	Recruit ratings: Scout: Rivals: (0)				
Overall recruit ranking:
Note: In many cases, Scout, Rivals, 247Sports, On3, and ESPN may conflict in their listings of height and weight.; In these cases, the average was taken. ESPN grades are on a 100-point scale.; Sources: "2017 Team Ranking". Rivals.

== Roster ==
2017–18 Sacramento State Hornets men's basketball team
Players
Coaches

Pos.	#	Name	Height	Weight	Year	Previous school	Hometown
G	0	Marcus Graves	6 ft 0 in (1.83 m)	188 lb (85 kg)	Sr	Westview HS	San Diego, California
F	1	Chibueze Jacobs	6 ft 4 in (1.93 m)	195 lb (88 kg)	So	Notre Dame HS	Canyon Country, California
G	2	Izayah Mauriohooho-Le'afa	6 ft 2 in (1.88 m)	200 lb (91 kg)	So	St. Patrick's College	Wellington, New Zealand
F	3	Justin Strings	6 ft 7 in (2.01 m)	220 lb (100 kg)	Sr	Mira Costa HS	Carson, California
G	4	Jiday Ugbaja	5 ft 11 in (1.8 m)	194 lb (88 kg)	Sr	Archbishop Riordan HS	San Francisco, California
G	11	Kevin Hicks	5 ft 11 in (1.8 m)	168 lb (76 kg)	Jr	Western Texas JC	New Orleans, Louisiana
G	12	Jordan Tolbert	5 ft 9 in (1.75 m)	150 lb (68 kg)	Jr	Western Texas JC	Houston, Texas
G	14	Jeff Wu	6 ft 2 in (1.88 m)	180 lb (82 kg)	Jr	Modesto Christian School	Taipei City, Taiwan
G	15	Jamion Wright (W)	5 ft 11 in (1.8 m)	160 lb (73 kg)	Fr	Mission HS	San Francisco, California
G/F	23	Bryce Fowler	6 ft 6 in (1.98 m)	195 lb (88 kg)	Fr	Agua Fria HS	Avondale, Arizona
F	25	Calvin Martin	6 ft 6 in (1.98 m)	235 lb (107 kg)	Jr	Citrus JC	Ridgecrest, California
F	30	Joshua Patton	6 ft 8 in (2.03 m)	225 lb (102 kg)	RS So	Sierra HS	Manteca, California
F	32	Cristian Perez	6 ft 7 in (2.01 m)	215 lb (98 kg)	Jr	Cerritos College	Santa Fe Springs, California
C	50	James Herrick	6 ft 10 in (2.08 m)	256 lb (116 kg)	Sr	Douglas HS	Minden, Nevada

Head coach

- Brian Katz (Sacramento State)

Assistant coach(es)

- Brandon Laird (UC Davis)
- Chris Walker (Oklahoma)
- Nate Smith (Sacramento State)

Legend

- (C) Team captain
- (S) Suspended
- (I) Ineligible
- (W) Walk-on
- Injured
- Current redshirt

Roster
Last update: November 16, 2017

== Schedule and results ==
Date time, TV	Rank^{#}	Opponent^{#}	Result	Record	Site (attendance) city, state
Exhibition
Nov 3, 2017*; 7:35 pm		UC Santa Cruz	W 94–75		Hornets Nest (681); Sacramento, CA
Non-conference regular season
Nov 10, 2017*; 7:45 pm		at Colorado State	L 61–72	0–1	Moby Arena (3,797); Fort Collins, CO
Nov 14, 2017*; 8:00 pm		Notre Dame de Namur	W 74–53	1–1	Hornets Nest (478); Sacramento, CA
Nov 17, 2017*; 7:05 pm		at San Francisco	L 56–69	1–2	War Memorial Gymnasium (1,804); San Francisco, CA
Nov 21, 2017*; 7:05 pm		vs. UC Davis; Sacramento Showcase	L 47–64	1–3	Golden 1 Center (2,200); Sacramento, CA
Nov 23, 2017*; 10:00 pm, ESPNU		vs. San Diego State; Wooden Legacy quarterfinals	L 52–89	1–4	Titan Gym (2,131); Fullerton, CA
Nov 24, 2017*; 6:30 pm, ESPN3		vs. Cal State Fullerton; Wooden Legacy consolation round	L 63–68	1–5	Titan Gym (2,513); Fullerton, CA
Nov 26, 2017*; 3:30 pm, ESPN3		vs. Saint Joseph's; Wooden Legacy 7th place game	L 69–74	1–6	Titan Gym (1,733); Fullerton, CA
Dec 4, 2017*; 7:05 pm		at Saint Mary's; Wooden Legacy unbracketed game	L 54–70	1–7	McKeon Pavilion (2,588); Moraga, CA
Dec 6, 2017*; 7:35 pm		Antelope Valley	W 97–74	2–7	Hornets Nest (534); Sacramento, CA
Dec 9, 2017*; 1:05 pm		at Boise State	L 54–77	2–8	Taco Bell Arena (4,648); Boise, ID
Dec 19, 2017*; 7:05 pm		Cal State Northridge	W 66–61	3–8	Hornets Nest (538); Sacramento, CA
Dec 21, 2017*; 5:35 pm		vs. Portland; Sacramento Showcase	L 75–80	3–9	Golden 1 Center (7,880); Sacramento, CA
Dec 23, 2017*; 7:05 pm		UC Santa Barbara	L 72–82	3–10	Hornets Nest (802); Sacramento, CA
Big Sky regular season
Dec 30, 2017; 7:05 pm		at Portland State	W 80–75	4–10 (1–0)	Hornets Nest (574); Sacramento, CA
Jan 4, 2018; 7:05 pm		at Idaho	L 68–69	4–11 (1–1)	Cowan Spectrum (1,829); Moscow, ID
Jan 6, 2018; 2:05 pm		Eastern Washington	L 67–82	4–12 (1–2)	Reese Court (1,464); Cheney, WA
Jan 11, 2018; 7:05 pm		Montana	L 66–78	4–13 (1–3)	Hornets Nest (721); Sacramento, CA
Jan 13, 2018; 7:05 pm		Montana State	W 87–68	5–13 (2–3)	Hornets Nest (702); Sacramento, CA
Jan 18, 2018; 6:05 pm		at Weber State	L 64–80	5–14 (2–4)	Dee Events Center (6,410); Ogden, UT
Jan 20, 2018; 6:05 pm		at Idaho State	L 65–71	5–15 (2–5)	Reed Gym (1,647); Pocatello, ID
Jan 27, 2018; 1:05 pm		at Portland State	W 71–61	6–15 (3–5)	Pamplin Sports Center (605); Portland, OR
Feb 1, 2018; 7:05 pm		Eastern Washington	L 54–74	6–16 (3–6)	Hornets Nest (568); Sacramento, CA
Feb 3, 2018; 7:05 pm		Idaho	L 58–81	6–17 (3–7)	Hornets Nest (675); Sacramento, CA
Feb 8, 2018; 6:05 pm		at Montana State	L 76–92	6–18 (3–8)	Brick Breeden Fieldhouse (2,703); Bozeman, MT
Feb 10, 2018; 6:05 pm, ELVN		at Montana	L 69–71 ^{OT}	6–19 (3–9)	Dahlberg Arena (4,592); Missoula, MT
Feb 15, 2018; 7:05 pm		Idaho State	L 64–67	6–20 (3–10)	Hornets Nest (532); Sacramento, CA
Feb 17, 2018; 7:05 pm		Weber State	L 73–83	6–21 (3–11)	Hornets Nest (623); Sacramento, CA
Feb 22, 2018; 5:35 pm		at Northern Arizona	L 53–58	6–22 (3–12)	Walkup Skydome (560); Flagstaff, AZ
Feb 24, 2018; 11:35 am		at Southern Utah	L 74–77	6–23 (3–13)	America First Events Center (2,740); Cedar City, UT
Mar 1, 2018; 7:05 pm		North Dakota	L 73–90	6–24 (3–14)	Hornets Nest (501); Sacramento, CA
Mar 3, 2018; 1:00 pm		Northern Colorado	W 88–77	7–24 (4–14)	Hornets Nest (686); Sacramento, CA
Big Sky tournament
Mar 6, 2018; 8:00 pm, Pluto TV	(11)	vs. (6) Portland State; First round	L 67–71	7–25	Reno Events Center (977); Reno, NV
*Non-conference game. ^{#}Rankings from AP Poll. (#) Tournament seedings in parentheses. All times are in Pacific Time..

== See also ==
2017–18 Sacramento State Hornets women's basketball team
