= 2017–18 Weber State Wildcats men's basketball team =

American college basketball season

2017–18 Weber State Wildcats men's basketball
- Conference: Big Sky Conference
- Record: 20–11 (13–5 Big Sky)
- Head coach: Randy Rahe (12th season)
- Assistant coaches: Eric Duft; Garrett Lever; David Marek
- Home arena: Dee Events Center

2017–18 Big Sky men's basketball standings
	Conf.				Overall
Team	W		L	PCT	W		L	PCT
Montana †	16	–	2	.889	26	–	8	.765
Idaho	14	–	4	.778	22	–	9	.710
Weber State	13	–	5	.722	20	–	11	.645
Eastern Washington	13	–	5	.722	20	–	15	.571
Northern Colorado	11	–	7	.611	26	–	12	.684
Idaho State	9	–	9	.500	14	–	16	.467
Portland State	9	–	9	.500	20	–	14	.588
Montana State	6	–	12	.333	13	–	19	.406
North Dakota	6	–	12	.333	12	–	20	.375
Southern Utah	5	–	13	.278	13	–	19	.406
Sacramento State	4	–	14	.222	7	–	25	.219
Northern Arizona	2	–	16	.111	5	–	27	.156
† Conference tournament winner

The 2017–18 Weber State Wildcats men's basketball team represented Weber State University during the 2017–18 NCAA Division I men's basketball season. The Wildcats were led by 12th-year head coach Randy Rahe and play their home games in the Dee Events Center in Ogden, Utah as members of the Big Sky Conference. They finished the season 20–11, 13–5 in Big Sky play to finish in a tie for third place. They lost in the quarterfinals of the Big Sky tournament to Northern Colorado.

== Previous season ==
The Wildcats finished the 2016–17 season 20–14, 12–6 in Big Sky play to finish in a tie for third place. As the No. 3 seed in the Big Sky tournament, they defeated Southern Utah and Eastern Washington before losing in the championship game to North Dakota. They were invited to the CollegeInsider.com Postseason Tournament where they defeated Cal State Fullerton in the first round to win the Riley Wallace Classic. In the second round, they lost to Texas A&M–Corpus Christi.

== Offseason ==
=== Departures ===
Name	Number	Pos.	Height	Weight	Year	Hometown	Reason for departure
Kiko Stavrev	0	F	6'7"	210	RS Freshman	Sofia, Bulgaria	Transferred to Eckerd
Juwan Williams	2	G/F	6'5"	190	Sophomore	Richmond, TX	Transferred to Panola College
George Darling	12	F	6'9"	200	Freshman	Doncaster, England	Transferred
Richaud Gittens	23	G	6'4"	200	Senior	Tempe, AZ	Graduate transferred to Seattle
McKay Cannon	24	G	6'1"	185	Sophomore	Highlands Ranch, CO	Transferred to BYU
Jeremy Senglin	30	G	6'2"	195	Senior	Arlington, TX	Graduated/Went undrafted in 2017 NBA draft
Kyndahl Hill	35	F	6'7"	235	Senior	Humble, TX	Graduated

=== 2017 recruiting class ===
College recruiting information
Name	Hometown	School	Height	Weight	Commit date
Rick Nelson; PG	Houston, TX	Episcopal High School	6 ft 1 in (1.85 m)	170 lb (77 kg)	Aug 1, 2016
Rick Nelson; PG	Recruit ratings: Scout: Rivals: (NR)				
Michal Kozak; PF	Plzen, Czech Republic	Get Better Academy	6 ft 8 in (2.03 m)	220 lb (100 kg)	
Michal Kozak; PF	Recruit ratings: Scout: Rivals: (NR)				
Anton Vialen; C	Espoo, Finland	Helsinki Basketball Academy	7 ft 0 in (2.13 m)	230 lb (100 kg)	
Anton Vialen; C	Recruit ratings: Scout: Rivals: (NR)				
Trevon Ary-Turner; PG	Issaquah, WA	Elite Sports Academy	6 ft 3 in (1.91 m)	180 lb (82 kg)	Jan 19, 2017
Trevon Ary-Turner; PG	Recruit ratings: Scout: Rivals: (NR)				
Riley Court; SG	Pleasant Grove, UT	Pleasant Grove High School	6 ft 4 in (1.93 m)	180 lb (82 kg)	
Riley Court; SG	Recruit ratings: Scout: Rivals: (NR)				
Overall recruit ranking:
Note: In many cases, Scout, Rivals, 247Sports, On3, and ESPN may conflict in their listings of height and weight.; In these cases, the average was taken. ESPN grades are on a 100-point scale.; Sources: "2017 Team Ranking". Rivals.

== Roster ==
2017–18 Weber State Wildcats men's basketball team
Players
Coaches

Pos.	#	Name	Height	Weight	Year	Previous school	Hometown
G	2	Ricky "Doc" Nelson	6 ft 1 in (1.85 m)	170 lb (77 kg)	Fr	Episcopal	Houston, TX
C	3	Jordan Dallas	6 ft 10 in (2.08 m)	220 lb (100 kg)	Jr	Long Beach Poly	Long Beach, CA
G	4	Riley Court	6 ft 4 in (1.93 m)	180 lb (82 kg)	Fr	Pleasant Grove	Pleasant Grove, UT
G	5	Cody John	6 ft 3 in (1.91 m)	185 lb (84 kg)	Jr	Wasatch Academy	Toronto, ON
G	10	Jerrick Harding	6 ft 1 in (1.85 m)	170 lb (77 kg)	So	Southeast	Wichita, KS
F	11	Michal Kozak	6 ft 8 in (2.03 m)	220 lb (100 kg)	Fr	Get Better Academy	Plzeň, Czech Republic
F	12	Alan Lang (W)	6 ft 7 in (2.01 m)	195 lb (88 kg)	Fr	Judge Memorial	Mobile, AL
G	15	Caleb Leonhardt (W)	6 ft 4 in (1.93 m)	190 lb (86 kg)	Fr	Davis	Kaysville, UT
G	21	Trevon Ary-Turner	6 ft 3 in (1.91 m)	185 lb (84 kg)	Fr	Elite Sports Academy	Issaquah, WA
G	22	Ryan Richardson	6 ft 4 in (1.93 m)	185 lb (84 kg)	Sr	Dobson	Mesa, AZ
F	23	Brekkott Chapman	6 ft 9 in (2.06 m)	215 lb (98 kg)	RS Jr	Roy; Utah	Roy, UT
F	24	Eric Patten (W)	6 ft 6 in (1.98 m)	240 lb (109 kg)	So	Crescenta Valley; Cuyamaca JC	Orange, CA
G/F	25	Dusty Baker	6 ft 4 in (1.93 m)	190 lb (86 kg)	Sr	Tesoro; Saddleback College	Rancho Santa Margarita, CA
C	31	Anton Vialen	7 ft 0 in (2.13 m)	230 lb (104 kg)	Fr	Helsinki Basketball Academy	Espoo, Finland
F	34	Brenden Morris (W)	6 ft 7 in (2.01 m)	185 lb (84 kg)	RS So	Ben Lomond	Syracuse, UT
F/C	44	Zach Braxton	6 ft 9 in (2.06 m)	250 lb (113 kg)	RS Jr	Highlands Ranch	Highlands Ranch, CO

Head coach

- Randy Rahe (Buena Vista)

Assistant coach(es)

- Eric Duft (Sterling (KS))
- Garrett Lever (Seattle)
- David Marek (Southern Utah)

Legend

- (C) Team captain
- (S) Suspended
- (I) Ineligible
- (W) Walk-on
- Injured
- Current redshirt

Roster

== Schedule and results ==
Date time, TV	Rank^{#}	Opponent^{#}	Result	Record	Site (attendance) city, state
Exhibition
Nov 2, 2017*; 7:00 pm		Western State	W 84–77		Dee Events Center; Ogden, UT
Non-conference regular season
Nov 10, 2017*; 7:00 pm		Utah State; Old Oquirrh Bucket	W 65–59	1–0	Dee Events Center (8,592); Ogden, UT
Nov 14, 2017*; 7:00 pm		West Coast Baptist	W 110–45	2–0	Dee Events Center (6,321); Ogden, UT
Nov 17, 2017*; 6:00 pm		vs. Iona; The Islands of the Bahamas Showcase Quarterfinals	L 72–80	2–1	Kendal Isaac Memorial Gymnasium (316); Nassau, Bahamas
Nov 18, 2017*; 12:00 pm		vs. James Madison; The Islands of the Bahamas Showcase Consolation Semifinals	W 73–65	3–1	Kendal Isaac Memorial Gymnasium (264); Nassau, Bahamas
Nov 19, 2017*; 12:00 pm		vs. Bradley; The Islands of the Bahamas Showcase 5th Place Game	L 64–70	3–2	Kendal Isaac Memorial Gymnasium (312); Nassau, Bahamas
Nov 25, 2017*; 7:00 pm		Black Hills State	W 105–52	4–2	Dee Events Center (6,057); Ogden, UT
Nov 30, 2017*; 8:00 pm		at Fresno State	L 71–83	4–3	Save Mart Center (5,105); Fresno, CA
Dec 6, 2017*; 7:00 pm		at Utah Valley; Old Oquirrh Bucket	L 56–83	4–4	UCCU Center (3,389); Orem, UT
Dec 9, 2017*; 8:00 pm, BYUtv		vs. BYU; Beehive Classic/Old Oquirrh Bucket	L 68–74	4–5	Vivint Smart Home Arena (7,729); Salt Lake City, UT
Dec 16, 2017*; 7:00 pm		Arkansas–Pine Bluff	W 96–74	5–5	Dee Events Center (6,544); Ogden, UT
Dec 19, 2017*; 7:00 pm, KJZZ		Pepperdine	W 72–67	6–5	Dee Events Center (6,576); Ogden, UT
Dec 22, 2017*; 7:00 pm		Presentation College	W 88–48	7–5	Dee Events Center (6,495); Ogden, UT
Big Sky regular season
Dec 30, 2017; 7:00 pm, ELVN		Idaho State	L 60–62	7–6 (0–1)	Dee Events Center (7,552); Ogden, UT
Jan 4, 2018; 7:00 pm, KJZZ		Northern Arizona	W 95–55	8–6 (1–1)	Dee Events Center (6,272); Ogden, UT
Jan 6, 2018; 7:00 pm, KJZZ		Southern Utah; Old Oquirrh Bucket	W 92–76	9–6 (2–1)	Dee Events Center (6,831); Ogden, UT
Jan 11, 2018; 7:00 pm		at Northern Colorado	W 78–74	10–6 (3–1)	Bank of Colorado Arena (1,792); Greeley, CO
Jan 13, 2018; 1:00 pm		at North Dakota	L 79–89	10–7 (3–2)	Betty Engelstad Sioux Center (2,188); Grand Forks, ND
Jan 18, 2018; 7:00 pm		Sacramento State	W 80–64	11–7 (4–2)	Dee Events Center (6,410); Ogden, UT
Jan 20, 2018; 7:00 pm		Portland State	W 84–79	12–7 (5–2)	Dee Events Center (6,911); Ogden, UT
Jan 27, 2018; 7:00 pm		at Idaho State	W 77–70	13–7 (6–2)	Holt Arena (2,584); Pocatello, ID
Feb 1, 2018; 6:30 pm		at Southern Utah; Old Oquirrh Bucket	W 90–80	14–7 (7–2)	America First Events Center (3,817); Cedar City, UT
Feb 3, 2018; 7:00 pm		at Northern Arizona	W 87–55	15–7 (8–2)	Walkup Skydome (622); Flagstaff, AZ
Feb 8, 2018; 7:00 pm, KJZZ		North Dakota	W 84–76	16–7 (9–2)	Dee Events Center (6,275); Ogden, UT
Feb 10, 2018; 7:00 pm, KJZZ		Northern Colorado	W 71–66 ^{OT}	17–7 (10–7)	Dee Events Center (6,909); Ogden, UT
Feb 15, 2018; 9:00 pm		at Portland State	W 95–86 ^{OT}	18–7 (11–2)	Pamplin Sports Center (540); Portland, OR
Feb 17, 2018; 8:00 pm		at Sacramento State	W 83–73	19–7 (12–2)	Hornets Nest (623); Sacramento, CA
Feb 22, 2018; 7:00 pm, KJZZ		Eastern Washington	L 70–75	19–8 (12–3)	Dee Events Center (6,425); Ogden, UT
Feb 24, 2018; 7:00 pm, ELVN		Idaho	L 62–68	19–9 (12–4)	Dee Events Center (7,513); Ogden, UT
Mar 1, 2018; 7:00 pm		at Montana	L 57–75	19–10 (12–5)	Dahlberg Arena (4,922); Missoula, MT
Mar 3, 2018; 2:00 pm		at Montana State	W 95–92 ^{OT}	20–10 (13–5)	Worthington Arena (7,250); Bozeman, MT
Big Sky tournament
Mar 8, 2018; 2:30 pm, ELVN	(4)	vs. (5) Northern Colorado	L 55–80	20–11	Reno Events Center (1,110); Reno, NV
*Non-conference game. ^{#}Rankings from AP Poll. (#) Tournament seedings in parentheses. All times are in Mountain Time.
