= 2018 Big Sky Conference men's basketball tournament =

- Classification: Division I
- Season: 2017–18
- Teams: 12
- Site: Reno Events Center; Reno, Nevada
- Champions: Montana (10th title)
- Winning coach: Travis DeCuire (1st title)
- MVP: Michael Oguine (Montana)
- Attendance: 6,765
- Television: Pluto TV, ELEVEN, ESPNU (final)

2017–18 Big Sky men's basketball standings
	Conf.				Overall
Team	W		L	PCT	W		L	PCT
Montana †	16	–	2	.889	26	–	8	.765
Idaho	14	–	4	.778	22	–	9	.710
Weber State	13	–	5	.722	20	–	11	.645
Eastern Washington	13	–	5	.722	20	–	15	.571
Northern Colorado	11	–	7	.611	26	–	12	.684
Idaho State	9	–	9	.500	14	–	16	.467
Portland State	9	–	9	.500	20	–	14	.588
Montana State	6	–	12	.333	13	–	19	.406
North Dakota	6	–	12	.333	12	–	20	.375
Southern Utah	5	–	13	.278	13	–	19	.406
Sacramento State	4	–	14	.222	7	–	25	.219
Northern Arizona	2	–	16	.111	5	–	27	.156
† Conference tournament winner

The 2018 Big Sky Conference men's basketball tournament was the postseason men's basketball tournament for the Big Sky Conference. The tournament was held from March 6–10, 2018 at the Reno Events Center in Reno, Nevada. Regular-season champion Montana defeated Eastern Washington in the championship game to win the tournament and receive the conference's automatic bid to the NCAA tournament.

== Seeds ==
Teams were seeded by conference record, with a tiebreaker system used to seed teams with identical conference records. The top four teams received a first round bye.

Seed	School	Record	Tiebreaker 1	Tiebreaker 2
1	Montana	16–2		
2	Idaho	14–4		
3	Eastern Washington	13–5	1–0 vs Weber State	
4	Weber State	13–5	0–1 vs Eastern Washington	
5	Northern Colorado	11–7		
6	Portland State	9–9	2–0 vs Idaho State	
7	Idaho State	9–9	0–2 vs Portland State	
8	North Dakota	6–12	1–1 vs Montana State	1–3 vs Eastern Washington/Weber State
9	Montana State	6–12	1–1 vs North Dakota	0–2 vs Eastern Washington/Weber State
10	Southern Utah	5–13		
11	Sacramento State	4–14		
12	Northern Arizona	2–16		

== Schedule ==
Session	Game	Time	Matchup	Score	Television	Attendance
First round – Tuesday, March 6
1	1	12:00 pm	No. 8 North Dakota vs. No. 9 Montana State	76–74	Pluto TV 231	986
1	2	2:30 pm	No. 5 Northern Colorado vs. No. 12 Northern Arizona	82–59	Pluto TV 231	986
2	3	5:30 pm	No. 7 Idaho State vs. No. 10 Southern Utah	68–76	Pluto TV 231	977
2	4	8:00 pm	No. 6 Portland State vs. No. 11 Sacramento State	71–67	Pluto TV 231	977
Quarterfinals – Thursday, March 8
3	5	12:00 pm	No. 1 Montana vs. No. 8 North Dakota	84–76	ELEVEN	1,110
3	6	2:30 pm	No. 4 Weber State vs. No. 5 Northern Colorado	55–80	ELEVEN Prime	1,110
4	7	5:30 pm	No. 2 Idaho vs. No. 10 Southern Utah	78–92	ELEVEN	1,078
4	8	8:00 pm	No. 3 Eastern Washington vs. No. 6 Portland State	78–72	ELEVEN	1,078
Semifinals – Friday, March 9
5	9	5:30 pm	No. 1 Montana vs No. 5 Northern Colorado	91–89 ^{OT}	ELEVEN	1,236
5	10	8:00 pm	No. 3 Eastern Washington vs No. 10 Southern Utah	82–70	ELEVEN	1,236
Championship game – Saturday, March 10
6	11	5:00 pm	No. 1 Montana vs No. 3 Eastern Washington	82–65	ESPNU	1,378
Game times in PT. Rankings denote tournament seeding.

== Bracket ==
First round Tuesday, March 6
8	North Dakota	76
9	Montana State	74
5	Northern Colorado	82
12	Northern Arizona	59
7	Idaho State	68
10	Southern Utah	76
6	Portland State	71
11	Sacramento State	67

Quarterfinals; Thursday, March 8
1	Montana	84
8	North Dakota	76
4	Weber State	55
5	Northern Colorado	80
2	Idaho	78
10	Southern Utah	92
3	Eastern Washington	78
6	Portland State	72

Semifinals; Friday, March 9
1	Montana	91*
5	Northern Colorado	89
10	Southern Utah	70
3	Eastern Washington	82

Final; Saturday, March 10
1	Montana	82
3	Eastern Washington	65

* denotes overtime period

== NCAA tournament ==
The Grizzlies received the automatic bid to the NCAA tournament; no other Big Sky members were invited to the tournament or the NIT. Montana was seeded 14th in the West regional and lost by fourteen to Michigan in the first round in Wichita. The last Big Sky team to advance in the NCAA tourney was Montana, a dozen years earlier in 2006.
