= 2017–18 Idaho State Bengals men's basketball team =

American college basketball season

2017–18 Idaho State Bengals men's basketball
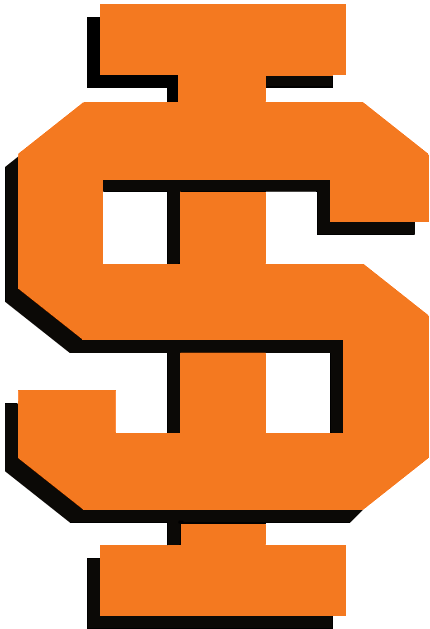
- Conference: Big Sky Conference
- Record: 14–16 (9–9 Big Sky)
- Head coach: Bill Evans (6th season)
- Assistant coaches: Andy Ward; Jay Collins; Tim Walsh
- Home arena: Holt Arena; Reed Gym

2017–18 Big Sky men's basketball standings
	Conf.				Overall
Team	W		L	PCT	W		L	PCT
Montana †	16	–	2	.889	26	–	8	.765
Idaho	14	–	4	.778	22	–	9	.710
Weber State	13	–	5	.722	20	–	11	.645
Eastern Washington	13	–	5	.722	20	–	15	.571
Northern Colorado	11	–	7	.611	26	–	12	.684
Idaho State	9	–	9	.500	14	–	16	.467
Portland State	9	–	9	.500	20	–	14	.588
Montana State	6	–	12	.333	13	–	19	.406
North Dakota	6	–	12	.333	12	–	20	.375
Southern Utah	5	–	13	.278	13	–	19	.406
Sacramento State	4	–	14	.222	7	–	25	.219
Northern Arizona	2	–	16	.111	5	–	27	.156
† Conference tournament winner

The 2017–18 Idaho State Bengals men's basketball team represented Idaho State University during the 2017–18 NCAA Division I men's basketball season. The Bengals, led by sixth-year head coach Bill Evans, played their home games at Holt Arena and Reed Gym in Pocatello, Idaho as members of the Big Sky Conference. They finished the season 14–16, 9–9 in Big Sky play to finish in a tie for sixth place. They lost in the first round of the Big Sky tournament to Southern Utah.

== Previous season ==
The Bengals finished the 2016–17 season 5–26, 3–15 in Big Sky play to finish in a tie for 11th place. As the No. 10 seed in the Big Sky tournament, they lost in the first round to Sacramento State.

== Offseason ==
=== Departures ===
Name	Number	Pos.	Height	Weight	Year	Hometown	Reason for departure
Ethan Telfair	3	G	6'0"	175	Senior	Coney Island, NY	Graduated
Robert Jones III	5	F	6'8"	195	RS Junior	Denver, CO	Graduate transferred to Le Moyne
Clark Wilkinson	22	F	6'7"	195	Freshman	Pocatello, ID	Left the team for personal reasons
Stephen Lennox	24	F	6'9"	220	Sophomore	Lovington, NM	Graduate transferred to Lubbock Christian
Keshawn Liggins	33	G	6'5"	195	Junior	Middletown, ID	Walk-on; graduate transferred to Edinboro (PA)
Kyle Ingram	35	F	6'8"	220	Senior	Pasadena, CA	Graduated

=== Incoming transfers ===
Name	Number	Pos.	Height	Weight	Year	Hometown	Previous School
Jared Stutzman	21	G	6'6"	205	Sophomore	Idaho Falls, ID	Transferred from Utah Valley. Under NCAA waiver rule, Stutzman will be eligible to play.
Jacob McCord	22	C	6'7"	225	Junior	Kailua, HI	Junior college transferred from Big Bend CC

=== 2017 recruiting class ===
Idaho State did not have any incoming players in the 2017 recruiting class.

== Roster ==
2017–18 Idaho State Bengals men's basketball team
Players
Coaches

Pos.	#	Name	Height	Weight	Year	Previous school	Hometown
G	0	Hayes Garrity	6 ft 2 in (1.88 m)	175 lb (79 kg)	RS Sr	Westview HS; Utah Valley	Beaverton, OR
G	1	Geno Luzcando	6 ft 3 in (1.91 m)	200 lb (91 kg)	Sr	Wasatch Academy HS	Estación Central, Chile
G	4	Sam Dowd	5 ft 7 in (1.7 m)	167 lb (76 kg)	Jr	Gonzaga Prep; North Idaho College	Seattle, WA
G	10	Lyle Sutton (W)	6 ft 2 in (1.88 m)	185 lb (84 kg)	RS Fr	Madison HS	Rexburg, ID
G	11	Erik Nakken	6 ft 3 in (1.91 m)	195 lb (88 kg)	RS Sr	Cedar HS	Cedar City, UT
C	13	Novak Topalovic	7 ft 0 in (2.13 m)	230 lb (104 kg)	RS Jr	Santa Margarita Catholic HS	Niš, Serbia
G	15	Brandon Boyd	5 ft 11 in (1.8 m)	170 lb (77 kg)	RS So	Middlebrooks Academy	Los Angeles, CA
G	20	Balint Moscan	6 ft 3 in (1.91 m)	182 lb (83 kg)	So	Kempelen Farkas Grammar School	Budapest, Hungary
G/F	21	Jared Stutzman	6 ft 6 in (1.98 m)	200 lb (91 kg)	So	Bonneville; Utah Valley	Idaho Falls, ID
F	22	Jacob McCord	6 ft 7 in (2.01 m)	220 lb (100 kg)	Jr	WestLake HS; Bend Big CC	Kailua, HI
G	23	Houston Wahlen (W)	6 ft 2 in (1.88 m)	175 lb (79 kg)	RS Fr	Aberdeen HS	Aberdeen, ID
F/C	24	Blake Truman	6 ft 8 in (2.03 m)	230 lb (104 kg)	Jr	Legend HS; Snow College	Las Vegas, NV
G	25	Gary Chivichyan	6 ft 4 in (1.93 m)	200 lb (91 kg)	Jr	Middlebrooks Academy	Los Angeles, CA
F	35	Kyle Ingram	6 ft 8 in (2.03 m)	220 lb (100 kg)	RS Sr	JSerra Catholic HS; Fresno City College	Pasadena, CA
F	44	Callum Kimberley	6 ft 8 in (2.03 m)	225 lb (102 kg)	RS Fr	Churchlands Senior HS	Perth, Australia

Head coach

- Bill Evans (Southern Utah)

Assistant coach(es)

- Andy Ward (Southern Utah)
- Jay Collins (Southern Utah)
- Tim Walsh (Western Illinois)

Legend

- (C) Team captain
- (S) Suspended
- (I) Ineligible
- (W) Walk-on
- Injured
- Current redshirt

Roster

== Schedule and results ==
Date time, TV	Rank^{#}	Opponent^{#}	Result	Record	Site (attendance) city, state
Non-conference regular season
Nov 10, 2017*; 8:00 pm, P12N		at Arizona State	L 74–94	0–1	Wells Fargo Arena (5,697); Tempe, AZ
Nov 14, 2017*; 7:00 pm		Utah Valley	L 71–84	0–2	Reed Gym (1,387); Pocatello, ID
Nov 18, 2017*; 2:30 pm, P12N		at Washington State	L 62–83	0–3	Beasley Coliseum (2,129); Pullman, WA
Nov 22, 2017*; 8:00 pm		at San Jose State	L 54–62	0–4	Event Center Arena (1,278); San Jose, CA
Nov 27, 2017*; 8:00 pm		at Seattle	L 67–73	0–5	KeyArena (1,178); Seattle, WA
Dec 1, 2017*; 7:00 pm		Bethesda	W 92–71	1–5	Holt Arena (1,392); Pocatello, ID
Dec 6, 2017*; 7:00 pm		Cal State Northridge	W 74–66	2–5	Holt Arena (1,300); Pocatello, ID
Dec 9, 2017*; 7:00 pm		Northwest Nazarene	W 73–57	3–5	Holt Arena (1,401); Pocatello, ID
Dec 18, 2017*; 7:00 pm		Youngstown State	W 86–62	4–5	Holt Arena (1,464); Pocatello, ID
Dec 21, 2017*; 7:00 pm, BYUtv		at BYU	L 71–85	4–6	Marriott Center (14,660); Provo, UT
Dec 23, 2017*; 4:00 pm		at Cal State Northridge	W 67–55	5–6	Matadome (476); Northridge, CA
Big Sky regular season
Dec 30, 2017; 7:00 pm, ELVN		at Weber State	W 62–60	6–6 (1–0)	Dee Events Center (7,552); Ogden, UT
Jan 4, 2018; 7:00 pm		Southern Utah	W 93–78	7–6 (2–0)	Holt Arena (1,567); Pocatello, ID
Jan 6, 2018; 7:00 pm		Northern Arizona	W 64–60	8–6 (3–0)	Holt Arena (1,625); Pocatello, ID
Jan 11, 2018; 6:00 pm		at North Dakota	L 58–81	8–7 (3–1)	Betty Engelstad Sioux Center (1,707); Grand Forks, ND
Jan 13, 2018; 7:00 pm		at Northern Colorado	L 80–94	8–8 (3–2)	Bank of Colorado Arena (1,165); Greeley, CO
Jan 18, 2018; 7:00 pm		Portland State	L 83–87	8–9 (3–3)	Reed Gym (1,645); Pocatello, ID
Jan 20, 2018; 7:00 pm		Sacramento State	W 71–65	9–9 (4–3)	Reed Gym (1,647); Pocatello, ID
Jan 27, 2018; 7:00 pm		Weber State	L 70–77	9–10 (4–4)	Holt Arena (2,584); Pocatello, ID
Feb 1, 2018; 7:00 pm		at Northern Arizona	W 63–61	10–10 (5–4)	Walkup Skydome (955); Flagstaff, AZ
Feb 3, 2018; 12:00 pm		at Southern Utah	L 80–84	10–11 (5–5)	America First Events Center (2,259); Cedar City, UT
Feb 8, 2018; 7:00 pm		Northern Colorado	L 82–85	10–12 (5–6)	Holt Arena (1,336); Pocatello, ID
Feb 11, 2018; 7:00 pm		North Dakota	W 82–67	11–12 (6–6)	Holt Arena (1,708); Pocatello, ID
Feb 15, 2018; 8:00 pm		at Sacramento State	W 67–64	12–12 (7–6)	Hornets Nest (532); Sacramento, CA
Feb 17, 2018; 2:00 pm		at Portland State	L 77–91	12–13 (7–7)	Pamplin Sports Center (613); Portland, OR
Feb 22, 2018; 7:00 pm		Idaho	W 86–83	13–13 (8–7)	Reed Gym (1,976); Pocatello, ID
Feb 24, 2018; 7:00 pm		Eastern Washington	L 69–74	13–14 (8–8)	Reed Gym (1,911); Pocatello, ID
Mar 1, 2018; 7:00 pm		at Montana State	W 101–78	14–14 (9–8)	Brick Breeden Fieldhouse (2,872); Bozeman, MT
Mar 3, 2018; 7:00 pm		at Montana	L 64–75	14–15 (9–9)	Dahlberg Arena (4,712); Missoula, MT
Big Sky tournament
Mar 6, 2018; 5:30 pm, Pluto TV	(7)	vs. (10) Southern Utah; First round	L 68–76	14–16	Reno Events Center (977); Reno, NV
*Non-conference game. ^{#}Rankings from AP Poll. (#) Tournament seedings in parentheses. All times are in Mountain Time.
