= 2017–18 Southern Utah Thunderbirds men's basketball team =

American college basketball season

2017–18 Southern Utah Thunderbirds men's basketball
- Conference: Big Sky Conference
- Record: 13–19 (5–13 Big Sky)
- Head coach: Todd Simon (2nd season)
- Assistant coaches: John Wardenburg; Chris Pompey; Trent Angelucci
- Home arena: America First Events Center

2017–18 Big Sky men's basketball standings
	Conf.				Overall
Team	W		L	PCT	W		L	PCT
Montana †	16	–	2	.889	26	–	8	.765
Idaho	14	–	4	.778	22	–	9	.710
Weber State	13	–	5	.722	20	–	11	.645
Eastern Washington	13	–	5	.722	20	–	15	.571
Northern Colorado	11	–	7	.611	26	–	12	.684
Idaho State	9	–	9	.500	14	–	16	.467
Portland State	9	–	9	.500	20	–	14	.588
Montana State	6	–	12	.333	13	–	19	.406
North Dakota	6	–	12	.333	12	–	20	.375
Southern Utah	5	–	13	.278	13	–	19	.406
Sacramento State	4	–	14	.222	7	–	25	.219
Northern Arizona	2	–	16	.111	5	–	27	.156
† Conference tournament winner

The 2017–18 Southern Utah Thunderbirds basketball team represented Southern Utah University during the 2017–18 NCAA Division I men's basketball season. The Thunderbirds were led by second-year head coach Todd Simon and played their home games at the America First Events Center in Cedar City, Utah as members of the Big Sky Conference. They finished the season 13–19, 5–13 in Big Sky play to finish in tenth place. In the Big Sky tournament they defeated Idaho State and Idaho to advance to the semifinals where they lost to Eastern Washington.

== Previous season ==
The Thunderbirds finished the 2016–17 season 6–27, 3–15 in Big Sky play to finish in a tie for 11th. As the No. 11 seed in the Big Sky tournament, they defeated Montana State in the first round before losing to Weber State in the quarterfinals.

== Offseason ==
=== Departures ===
Name	Number	Pos.	Height	Weight	Year	Hometown	Reason for departure
Randy Onwausor	2	G	6'3"	210	RS Junior	Inglewood, CA	Graduate transferred to LSU
Decardo Day	3	G	6'4"	170	Freshman	Jackson, MS	Transferred
Neema Namdar	4	G	6'1"	170	Freshman	Sandy, UT	Transferred to Utah State University Eastern
John Marshall	5	G	6'1"	180	Senior	Phoenix, AZ	Graduated
Will Joyce	11	F	6'5"	205	Senior	Newark, NJ	Graduated
Race Parsons	13	G	6'4"	185	Senior	Monroe, UT	Graduated
Adonis Saltes	24	G	6'2"	180	Sophomore	Pine Ridge, SD	Walk-on; left the team for personal reasons
Brayden Holker	35	F	6'9"	225	RS Freshman	Saratoga Springs, UT	Walk-on; left the team for personal reasons

=== Incoming transfers ===
Name	Number	Pos.	Height	Weight	Year	Hometown	Previous School
Jamil Jackson	1	G	6'6"	190	Sophomore	Minneapolis, MN	Junior college transferred from Williston State College
Brandon Better	2	G	6'2"	180	Junior	Suitland, MD	Junior college transferred from Moberly Area CC
Jamal Aytes	15	F	6'6"	235	RS Senior	San Diego, CA	Transferred from Southern Utah. Will be eligible to play immediately since Aytes graduated from BYU.
Cameron Oluyitan	23	G	6'6"	183	Junior	Houston, TX	Transferred from Boise State. Under NCAA transfer rules, Oluyitan will have to sit out for the 2017–18 season. Will have two years of remaining eligibility.
Andre Adams	32	F	6'9"	225	RS Sophomore	Avondale, AZ	Transferred from Arizona State. Under NCAA transfer rules, Adams will have to sit out for the 2017–18 season. Will have three years of remaining eligibility.

=== 2017 recruiting class ===
College recruiting information
Name	Hometown	School	Height	Weight	Commit date
Dre Marin; PG	Glendale, AZ	Apollo High School	5 ft 11 in (1.80 m)	165 lb (75 kg)	Oct 14, 2016
Dre Marin; PG	Recruit ratings: Scout: Rivals: (NR)				
Jordan Lyons; SF	Brampton, ON	Athlete Institute Prep	6 ft 7 in (2.01 m)	200 lb (91 kg)	Jan 5, 2017
Jordan Lyons; SF	Recruit ratings: Scout: Rivals: (NR)				
Overall recruit ranking:
Note: In many cases, Scout, Rivals, 247Sports, On3, and ESPN may conflict in their listings of height and weight.; In these cases, the average was taken. ESPN grades are on a 100-point scale.; Sources: "2017 Team Ranking". Rivals.

== Roster ==
2017–18 Southern Utah Thunderbirds men's basketball team
Players
Coaches

Pos.	#	Name	Height	Weight	Year	Previous school	Hometown
G/F	1	Jamil Jackson	6 ft 6 in (1.98 m)	190 lb (86 kg)	So	North HS; Willison State College	Minneapolis, MN
G	2	Brandon Better	6 ft 3 in (1.91 m)	185 lb (84 kg)	Jr	Crossland HS; Moberly Area CC	Suitland, MD
G	4	Dre Marin	5 ft 11 in (1.8 m)	165 lb (75 kg)	Fr	Apollo HS	Glendale, AZ
G/F	5	Jordan Lyons	6 ft 7 in (2.01 m)	200 lb (91 kg)	Fr	Athlete Institute Prep	Brampton, ON
F	10	Jacob Calloway	6 ft 8 in (2.03 m)	205 lb (93 kg)	So	On Point Academy	Juneau, AK
G	12	Jadon Cohee	6 ft 4 in (1.93 m)	205 lb (93 kg)	RS Jr	Walnut Grove Secondary; Seattle	Langley, BC
G	13	Taelin Webb (W)	5 ft 11 in (1.8 m)	195 lb (88 kg)	RS Jr	Roosevelt HS; South Plains College	Fresno, CA
G	14	James McGee (W)	6 ft 2 in (1.88 m)	200 lb (91 kg)	RS Sr	Mater Dei HS	San Clemente, CA
F	15	Jamal Aytes	6 ft 6 in (1.98 m)	240 lb (109 kg)	RS Sr	JSerra; BYU	San Diego, CA
F	22	Ivan Madunic	6 ft 11 in (2.11 m)	225 lb (102 kg)	So	None	Split, Croatia
G/F	23	Cameron Oluyitan (redshirt)	6 ft 7 in (2.01 m)	190 lb (86 kg)	Jr	Clements HS; Boise State	Houston, TX
G/F	30	Elijah Graves (W)	6 ft 4 in (1.93 m)	210 lb (95 kg)	Sr	Liberty HS	Las Vegas, NV
F	32	Andre Adams	6 ft 9 in (2.06 m)	230 lb (104 kg)	RS So	IMG Academy; Arizona State	Avondale, AZ
G	33	Matthew Johnson (W)	6 ft 4 in (1.93 m)	210 lb (95 kg)	Jr	Coronado HS	Las Vegas, NV
F/C	34	Christian Musoko	6 ft 8 in (2.03 m)	245 lb (111 kg)	Sr	Layton Christian HS; Salt Lake CC	Kinshasa, Congo
F	44	Joel Swallow (W)	6 ft 9 in (2.06 m)	230 lb (104 kg)	RS So	Millard HS	Howell, UT

Head coach

- Todd Simon (UNLV)

Assistant coach(es)

- John Wardenburg (BYU)
- Chris Pompey (Pittsburgh)
- Trent Angelucci (South Carolina)

Legend

- (C) Team captain
- (S) Suspended
- (I) Ineligible
- (W) Walk-on
- Injured
- Current redshirt

Roster

== Schedule and results ==
Date time, TV	Rank^{#}	Opponent^{#}	Result	Record	Site (attendance) city, state
Exhibition
Nov 3, 2017*; 8:00 pm		Concordia (OR)	W 101–84		America First Events Center (1,200); Cedar City, UT
Non-conference regular season
Nov 10, 2017*; 8:00 pm, P12N		at Oregon State	L 82–99	0–1	Gill Coliseum (4,588); Corvallis, OR
Nov 12, 2017*; 3:00 pm		at Boise State	L 69–90	0–2	Taco Bell Arena (3,052); Boise, ID
Nov 16, 2017*; 6:30 pm		San Jose State	W 81–65	1–2	America First Events Center (1,515); Cedar City, UT
Nov 21, 2017*; 8:00 pm		Benedictine (Mesa)	W 85–68	2–2	America First Events Center (1,478); Cedar City, UT
Nov 25, 2017*; 8:00 pm		at UNLV	L 82–101	2–3	Thomas & Mack Center (9,543); Paradise, NV
Nov 29, 2017*; 8:00 pm		at Pepperdine	W 88–82	3–3	Firestone Fieldhouse (912); Malibu, CA
Dec 2, 2017*; 6:00 pm		San Diego Christian	W 87–68	4–3	America First Events Center (1,195); Cedar City, UT
Dec 6, 2017*; 6:00 pm		Long Beach State	W 94–89	5–3	America First Events Center (2,487); Cedar City, UT
Dec 9, 2017*; 4:00 pm, BTN		at No. 3 Michigan State	L 63–88	5–4	Breslin Center (14,797); East Lansing, MI
Dec 16, 2017*; 12:00 pm		Central Michigan	W 86–80	6–4	America First Events Center (1,406); Cedar City, UT
Dec 19, 2017*; 7:00 pm, BTN		at Iowa	L 64–92	6–5	Carver–Hawkeye Arena (10,220); Iowa City, IA
Big Sky regular season
Dec 28, 2017; 6:30 pm		Montana State	L 99–104	6–6 (0–1)	America First Events Center (1,472); Cedar City, UT
Dec 30, 2017; 12:30 pm		Montana	L 49–79	6–7 (0–2)	America First Events Center (1,263); Cedar City, UT
Jan 4, 2018; 7:00 pm		at Idaho State	L 78–93	6–8 (0–3)	Holt Arena (1,567); Pocatello, ID
Jan 6, 2018; 7:00 pm		at Weber State	L 76–92	6–9 (0–4)	Dee Events Center (6,831); Ogden, UT
Jan 13, 2018; 7:00 pm, ELVN		Northern Arizona	W 81–75	7–9 (1–4)	America First Events Center (2,784); Cedar City, UT
Jan 18, 2018; 6:30 pm		Idaho	L 76–80	7–10 (1–5)	America First Events Center (3,578); Cedar City, UT
Jan 20, 2018; 12:30 pm		Eastern Washington	W 66–62	8–10 (2–5)	America First Events Center (2,229); Cedar City, UT
Jan 25, 2018; 7:00 pm		at Montana	L 47–71	8–11 (2–6)	Dahlberg Arena (4,040); Missoula, MT
Jan 27, 2018; 2:00 pm		at Montana State	L 66–69	8–12 (2–7)	Brick Breeden Fieldhouse (2,851); Bozeman, MT
Feb 1, 2018; 6:30 pm		Weber State	L 80–90	8–13 (2–8)	America First Events Center (3,817); Cedar City, UT
Feb 3, 2018; 12:30 pm		Idaho State	W 84–80	9–13 (3–8)	America First Events Center (2,259); Cedar City, UT
Feb 10, 2018; 2:00 pm		at Northern Arizona	W 63–54	10–13 (4–8)	Walkup Skydome (405); Flagstaff, AZ
Feb 15, 2018; 6:00 pm		at North Dakota	L 57–61	10–14 (4–9)	Betty Engelstad Sioux Center (1,456); Grand Forks, ND
Feb 17, 2018; 7:00 pm		at Northern Colorado	L 80–97	10–15 (4–10)	Bank of Colorado Arena (1,683); Greeley, CO
Feb 22, 2018; 6:30 pm		Portland State	L 91–96 ^{OT}	10–16 (4–11)	America First Events Center (3,245); Cedar City, UT
Feb 24, 2018; 12:30 pm		Sacramento State	W 77–74	11–16 (5–11)	America First Events Center (2,740); Cedar City, UT
Mar 1, 2018; 7:05 pm		at Eastern Washington	L 51–74	11–17 (5–12)	Reese Court (1,637); Cheney, WA
Mar 3, 2018; 8:00 pm		at Idaho	L 76–78	11–18 (5–13)	Cowan Spectrum (3,219); Moscow, ID
Big Sky tournament
Mar 6, 2018; 5:30 pm, Pluto TV	(10)	vs. (7) Idaho State; First round	W 76–68	12–18	Reno Events Center (977); Reno, NV
Mar 8, 2018; 5:30 pm, ELVN	(10)	vs. (2) Idaho; Quarterfinals	W 92–78	13–18	Reno Events Center (1,078); Reno, NV
Mar 9, 2018; 8:00 pm, ELVN	(10)	vs. (3) Eastern Washington; Semifinals	L 70–82	13–19	Reno Events Center (1,236); Reno, NV
*Non-conference game. ^{#}Rankings from AP Poll. (#) Tournament seedings in parentheses. All times are in Mountain Time.
