= 2017–18 Eastern Washington Eagles men's basketball team =

American college basketball season

2017–18 Eastern Washington Eagles men's basketball

CBI, First round
- Conference: Big Sky Conference
- Record: 20–15 (13–5 Big Sky)
- Head coach: Shantay Legans (1st season)
- Associate head coach: Nick Booker
- Assistant coaches: David Riley; Bobby Suarez
- Home arena: Reese Court

2017–18 Big Sky men's basketball standings
	Conf.				Overall
Team	W		L	PCT	W		L	PCT
Montana †	16	–	2	.889	26	–	8	.765
Idaho	14	–	4	.778	22	–	9	.710
Weber State	13	–	5	.722	20	–	11	.645
Eastern Washington	13	–	5	.722	20	–	15	.571
Northern Colorado	11	–	7	.611	26	–	12	.684
Idaho State	9	–	9	.500	14	–	16	.467
Portland State	9	–	9	.500	20	–	14	.588
Montana State	6	–	12	.333	13	–	19	.406
North Dakota	6	–	12	.333	12	–	20	.375
Southern Utah	5	–	13	.278	13	–	19	.406
Sacramento State	4	–	14	.222	7	–	25	.219
Northern Arizona	2	–	16	.111	5	–	27	.156
† Conference tournament winner

The 2017–18 Eastern Washington Eagles men's basketball team represented Eastern Washington University during the 2017–18 NCAA Division I men's basketball season. The Eagles were led by first-year head coach Shantay Legans and played their home games at Reese Court in Cheney, Washington as members of the Big Sky Conference. They finished the season 20–15, 13–5 in Big Sky play to finish in a tie for third place. At the Big Sky tournament they defeated Portland State and Southern Utah to advance to the championship game where they lost to Montana. They were invited to the College Basketball Invitational where they lost in the first round to Utah Valley.

== Previous season ==
The Eagles finished the 2016–17 season 22–12, 13–5 in Big Sky play to finish in second place. As the No. 2 seed in the Big Sky tournament, they defeated Sacramento State in the quarterfinals before losing to Weber State in the semifinals. They were invited to the College Basketball Invitational where they lost in the first round to Wyoming.

On March 29, 2017, head coach Jim Hayford left Eastern Washington to take the head coaching job at in-state rival Seattle and was replaced by top assistant Shantay Legans.

== Offseason ==
=== Departures ===
Name	Number	Pos.	Height	Weight	Year	Hometown	Reason for departure
Julian Harrell	0	G	6'5"	195	RS Senior	Los Angeles, CA	Graduated
Michael Wearne	5	G	6'2"	175	Freshman	Croydon, Australia	Transferred
Jacob Wiley	24	F	6'7"	220	RS Senior	Newport, WA	Graduated/Went undrafted in 2017 NBA draft
Geremy McKay	40	F	6'7"	225	RS Sophomore	Melbourne, Australia	Transferred
Mario Soto	42	G	6'6"	205	RS Sophomore	Irvine, CA	Walk-on; didn't return
Felix Von Hofe	44	F	6'5"	200	Senior	Melbourne, Australia	Graduated

=== Incoming transfers ===
Name	Number	Pos.	Height	Weight	Year	Hometown	Previous School
Tyler Kidd	0	G	5'11"		Junior	Seattle, WA	Junior college transferred from Skagit Valley College.
Benas Griciūnas	15	C	7'0"	244	RS Junior	Šilutė, Lithuania	Transferred from Charlotte. Was eligible to play immediately since Griciūnas graduated from Charlotte.
Steven Beo	25	G	6'3"	180	Sophomore	Richland, WA	Transferred from BYU. Under NCAA transfer rules, Beo was required to sit out the 2017–18 season. Will have three years of remaining eligibility.

=== 2017 recruiting class ===
College recruiting information
Name	Hometown	School	Height	Weight	Commit date
Brendan Howard; SF	Great Falls, MT	Great Falls High School	6 ft 6 in (1.98 m)	200 lb (91 kg)	Sep 14, 2016
Brendan Howard; SF	Recruit ratings: Scout: Rivals: (0)				
Tanner Groves; PF	Spokane, WA	Shadle Park High School	6 ft 9 in (2.06 m)	N/A	Oct 26, 2016
Tanner Groves; PF	Recruit ratings: Scout: Rivals: (0)				
Jack Perry; SG	Melbourne, Australia	Camberwell Grammar School	6 ft 2 in (1.88 m)	N/A	
Jack Perry; SG	Recruit ratings: Scout: Rivals: (0)				
Kim Aiken; SF	Redlands, CA	East Valley High School	6 ft 7 in (2.01 m)	N/A	
Kim Aiken; SF	Recruit ratings: Scout: Rivals: (0)				
Richard Polanco; SF	San Diego, CA	Army and Navy Academy	6 ft 7 in (2.01 m)	215 lb (98 kg)	
Richard Polanco; SF	Recruit ratings: Scout: Rivals: (0)				
Overall recruit ranking:
Note: In many cases, Scout, Rivals, 247Sports, On3, and ESPN may conflict in their listings of height and weight.; In these cases, the average was taken. ESPN grades are on a 100-point scale.; Sources: "2017 Team Ranking". Rivals.

== Preseason ==
In separate preseason polls of league coaches and media, the Eagles were picked to finish in seventh place (coaches) and sixth place (media) in the Big Sky. Senior forward Bogdan Bliznyuk was named to the preseason All-Big Sky team.

== Roster ==
2017–18 Eastern Washington Eagles men's basketball team
Players
Coaches

Pos.	#	Name	Height	Weight	Year	Previous school	Hometown
G	0	Tyler Kidd (redshirt)	5 ft 11 in (1.8 m)	180 lb (82 kg)	Jr	O'Dea HS; Skagit Valley College	Seattle, Washington
G	2	Ty Gibson	6 ft 3 in (1.91 m)	190 lb (86 kg)	Jr	Issaquah HS	Issaquah, Washington
G	4	Sir Washington	6 ft 3 in (1.91 m)	180 lb (82 kg)	RS Sr	Clark HS	Las Vegas, Nevada
F	5	Richard Polanco	6 ft 8 in (2.03 m)	225 lb (102 kg)	Fr	Army and Navy Academy	Santiago de los Caballeros, DR
G	10	Jacob Davison	6 ft 4 in (1.93 m)	175 lb (79 kg)	RS Fr	Cantwell-Sacred Heart HS	Montebello, California
G	11	Jack Perry	6 ft 2 in (1.88 m)	175 lb (79 kg)	Fr	Camberwell Grammar School	Melbourne, Australia
G	12	Grant Gibb (W)	6 ft 5 in (1.96 m)	185 lb (84 kg)	RS So	Mark Morris HS	Longview, Washington
G	13	Luka Vulikić	6 ft 5 in (1.96 m)	190 lb (86 kg)	So	None	Belgrade, Serbia
F	14	Mason Peatling	6 ft 8 in (2.03 m)	220 lb (100 kg)	So	Beaconhills College HS	Melbourne, Australia
C	15	Benas Griciūnas	7 ft 0 in (2.13 m)	244 lb (111 kg)	RS Sr	Findlay Prep; Auburn/Charlotte	Šilutė, Lithuania
G	20	Cody Benzel (W)	6 ft 4 in (1.93 m)	175 lb (79 kg)	RS Jr	Ferris HS	Spokane, Washington
F	23	Brendan Howard	6 ft 6 in (1.98 m)	225 lb (102 kg)	Fr	Great Falls HS	Great Falls, Montana
G/F	24	Kim Aiken	6 ft 7 in (2.01 m)	215 lb (98 kg)	Fr	East Valley HS	Redlands, California
G	25	Steven Beo (I) (redshirt)	6 ft 3 in (1.91 m)	180 lb (82 kg)	So	Richland HS; BYU	Richland, Washington
F	32	Bogdan Bliznyuk (C)	6 ft 6 in (1.98 m)	215 lb (98 kg)	Sr	Todd Beamer HS	Lutsk, Ukraine
F	34	Jesse Hunt	6 ft 7 in (2.01 m)	210 lb (95 kg)	Jr	Sir Francis Drake HS	Geraldton, Australia
F	35	Tanner Groves (redshirt)	6 ft 9 in (2.06 m)	235 lb (107 kg)	Fr	Shadle Park HS	Spokane, Washington
G	42	Joshua Thomas	6 ft 3 in (1.91 m)	185 lb (84 kg)	RS Fr	Central Valley HS	Spokane, Washington

Head coach

- Shantay Legans (Fresno State)

Assistant coach(es)

- Nick Booker (Davidson)
- David Riley (Whitworth)
- Bobby Suarez (Florida Gulf Coast)

Legend

- (C) Team captain
- (S) Suspended
- (I) Ineligible
- (W) Walk-on
- Injured
- Current redshirt

Roster

== Schedule and results ==
Date time, TV	Rank^{#}	Opponent^{#}	Result	Record	Site (attendance) city, state
Exhibition
Oct 29, 2017*; 5:00 pm		at Portland; Hurricane Maria relief charity game	W 76–70		Chiles Center (500); Portland, OR
Non-conference regular season
Nov 10, 2017*; 1:05 pm		Walla Walla	W 82–61	1–0	Reese Court; Cheney, WA
Nov 12, 2017*; 5:00 pm, P12N		at Washington	L 69–79	1–1	Alaska Airlines Arena (5,609); Seattle, WA
Nov 14, 2017*; 8:00 pm, P12N		at Stanford	W 67–61	2–1	Maples Pavilion (2,799); Stanford, CA
Nov 17, 2017*; 7:00 pm		at UNLV; MGM Resorts Main Event campus-site game	L 76–91	2–2	Thomas & Mack Center (8,900); Paradise, NV
Nov 20, 2017*; 1:30 pm		vs. Georgia State; MGM Resorts Main Event Middleweight semifinals	L 50–68	2–3	T-Mobile Arena; Paradise, NV
Nov 22, 2017*; 11:00 am		vs. Eastern Kentucky; MGM Resorts Main Event Middleweight 3rd place game	W 83–62	3–3	T-Mobile Arena; Paradise, NV
Nov 24, 2017*; 5:00 pm, P12N		at Utah; MGM Resorts Main Event campus-site game	L 69–85	3–4	Jon M. Huntsman Center (13,264); Salt Lake City, UT
Dec 3, 2017*; 1:00 pm		at Seattle	L 65–84	3–5	KeyArena (1,487); Seattle, WA
Dec 7, 2017*; 7:00 pm		at San Francisco	L 71–81	3–6	War Memorial Gymnasium (1,137); San Francisco, CA
Dec 10, 2017*; 11:00 am, ESPN3		at South Dakota	L 73–75	3–7	Sanford Coyote Sports Center (1,998); Vermillion, SD
Dec 12, 2017*; 6:00 pm		at Wyoming	L 88–93 ^{OT}	3–8	Arena-Auditorium (4,363); Laramie, WY
Dec 17, 2017*; 2:05 pm		Cal State Northridge	W 86–58	4–8	Reese Court (1,279); Cheney, WA
Dec 20, 2017*; 6:05 pm		Providence (MT)	W 94–66	5–8	Reese Court (1,056); Cheney, WA
Big Sky regular season
Dec 29, 2017; 6:00 pm		at Northern Colorado	L 75–88	5–9 (0–1)	Bank of Colorado Arena (1,047); Greeley, CO
Dec 31, 2017; 2:00 pm		at North Dakota	W 77–64	6–9 (1–1)	Betty Engelstad Sioux Center (1,548); Grand Forks, ND
Jan 4, 2018; 6:05 pm, SWX		Portland State	W 81–74	7–9 (2–1)	Reese Court (1,375); Cheney, WA
Jan 6, 2018; 2:05 pm		Sacramento State	W 82–67	8–9 (3–1)	Reese Court (1,464); Cheney, WA
Jan 12, 2018; 7:30 pm, SWX		Idaho	L 51–58	8–10 (3–2)	Reese Court (2,334); Cheney, WA
Jan 18, 2018; 5:30 pm		at Northern Arizona	W 81–76	9–10 (4–2)	Walkup Skydome (1,017); Flagstaff, AZ
Jan 20, 2018; 11:30 am		at Southern Utah	L 62–66 ^{OT}	9–11 (4–3)	America First Events Center (2,229); Cedar City, UT
Jan 25, 2018; 6:05 pm		North Dakota	W 95–71	10–11 (5–3)	Reese Court (1,679); Cheney, WA
Jan 27, 2018; 2:05 pm, ELVN		Northern Colorado	W 67–65	11–11 (6–3)	Reese Court (1,674); Cheney, WA
Feb 1, 2018; 7:05 pm		at Sacrmento State	W 74–54	12–11 (7–3)	Hornets Nest (568); Sacramento, CA
Feb 3, 2018; 1:00 pm		at Portland State	L 81–94	12–12 (7–4)	Pamplin Sports Center (527); Portland, OR
Feb 9, 2018; 7:30 pm, SWX		at Idaho	L 64–66	12–13 (7–5)	Cowan Spectrum (3,192); Moscow, ID
Feb 15, 2018; 6:05 pm		Montana	W 74–65	13–13 (8–5)	Reese Court (2,354); Cheney, WA
Feb 17, 2018; 2:05 pm, ELVN		Montana State	W 84–79	14–13 (9–5)	Reese Court (1,804); Cheney, WA
Feb 22, 2018; 6:00 pm		at Weber State	W 75–70	15–13 (10–5)	Dee Events Center (6,425); Ogden, UT
Feb 24, 2018; 6:00 pm		at Idaho State	W 74–69	16–13 (11–5)	Reed Gym (1,911); Pocatello, ID
Mar 1, 2018; 6:05 pm		Southern Utah	W 74–51	17–13 (12–5)	Reese Court (1,637); Cheney, WA
Mar 3, 2018; 2:05 pm		Northern Arizona	W 85–68	18–13 (13–5)	Reese Court (2,032); Cheney, WA
Big Sky tournament
Mar 8, 2018; 8:05 pm, ELVN	(3)	(6) Portland State; Quarterfinals	W 78–72	19–13	Reno Events Center (1,078); Reno, NV
Mar 9, 2018; 8:05 pm, ELVN	(3)	(10) Southern Utah; Semifinals	W 82–70	20–13	Reno Events Center (1,236); Reno, NV
Mar 10, 2018; 5:05 pm, ESPNU	(3)	(1) Montana; Championship game	L 65–82	20–14	Reno Events Center (1,378); Reno, NV
CBI
Mar 13, 2018*; 6:00 pm		at Utah Valley; First round	L 65–87	20–15	UCCU Center (997); Orem, UT
*Non-conference game. ^{#}Rankings from AP Poll. (#) Tournament seedings in parentheses. All times are in Pacific Time.

== See also ==
- 2017–18 Eastern Washington Eagles women's basketball team
