= 2017–18 North Dakota Fighting Hawks men's basketball team =

American college basketball season

2017–18 North Dakota Fighting Hawks men's basketball
- Conference: Big Sky Conference
- Record: 12–20 (6–12 Big Sky)
- Head coach: Brian Jones (12th season)
- Assistant coaches: Brad Davidson; Steve Grabowski; Jeff Horner
- Home arena: Betty Engelstad Sioux Center

2017–18 Big Sky men's basketball standings
	Conf.				Overall
Team	W		L	PCT	W		L	PCT
Montana †	16	–	2	.889	26	–	8	.765
Idaho	14	–	4	.778	22	–	9	.710
Weber State	13	–	5	.722	20	–	11	.645
Eastern Washington	13	–	5	.722	20	–	15	.571
Northern Colorado	11	–	7	.611	26	–	12	.684
Idaho State	9	–	9	.500	14	–	16	.467
Portland State	9	–	9	.500	20	–	14	.588
Montana State	6	–	12	.333	13	–	19	.406
North Dakota	6	–	12	.333	12	–	20	.375
Southern Utah	5	–	13	.278	13	–	19	.406
Sacramento State	4	–	14	.222	7	–	25	.219
Northern Arizona	2	–	16	.111	5	–	27	.156
† Conference tournament winner

The 2017–18 North Dakota Fighting Hawks men's basketball team represented the University of North Dakota during the 2017–18 NCAA Division I men's basketball season. The Fighting Hawks, led by 12th-year head coach Brian Jones, played their home games at the Betty Engelstad Sioux Center in Grand Forks, North Dakota as members of the Big Sky Conference. They finished the season 12–20, 6–12 in Big Sky play to finish in a tie for eighth place. They defeated Montana State in the first round of the Big Sky tournament before losing in the quarterfinals to Montana.

This season was the last for North Dakota as a full Big Sky member. On July 1, 2018, the school will join the Summit League in all sports except for football, in which it will remain a Big Sky member before joining the Missouri Valley Football Conference in 2020.

== Previous season ==
The Fighting Hawks finished the 2016–17 season 22–10, 14–4 in Big Sky play to win the Big Sky regular season championship. In the Big Sky tournament, they defeated Portland State, Idaho, and Weber State to win the tournament championship. As a result, they received the conference's automatic bid to the NCAA tournament and the school's first ever bid to the NCAA Tournament. As a No. 15 seed in the West region, they lost to No. 2-seeded and No. 4-ranked Arizona in the first round.

== Offseason ==
=== Departures ===
Name	Number	Pos.	Height	Weight	Year	Hometown	Notes
Corey Baldwin	1	G	6'3"	190	Senior	Bridgeport, CT	Graduated
Carson Shanks	5	C	7'0"	230	RS Junior	Prior Lake, MN	Graduate transferred to Loyola–Chicago
Shane Benton	10	C	7'0"	230	RS Senior	Cedar Rapids, IA	Graduated
Wheeler Baker	13	G	6'2"	175	Sophomore	Brooklyn Park, MN	Left the team for personal reasons
Thomas Blake	20	G	6'2"	200	RS Senior	Hagerstown, MD	Walk-on; graduated
Quinton Hooker	21	G	6'0"	205	Senior	Brooklyn Park, MD	Graduated
Devon Pekas	25	G	6'4"	210	Senior	Hawley, MN	Graduated
Drick Bernstine	43	F	6'8"	220	RS Junior	Aurora, CO	Graduate transferred to Washington State

=== Incoming transfers ===
Name	Number	Pos.	Height	Weight	Year	Hometown	Previous School
Jaqwan McCauley	10	G/F	6'6"	210	Junior	Greensboro, NC	Junior college transferred from Tyler Junior College.
Dale Jones	13	F	6'7"	227	Senior	Waterloo, IA	Transferred from Iowa. Will be eligible to play immediately since Jones graduated from Iowa.

=== 2017 incoming recruits ===
College recruiting information
Name	Hometown	School	Height	Weight	Commit date
Garrett Franken; SF	Atlantic, IA	Atlantic High School	6 ft 7 in (2.01 m)	190 lb (86 kg)	Jul 10, 2016
Garrett Franken; SF	Recruit ratings: Scout: Rivals: (NR)				
Tray Buchanan; PG	East Moline, IL	United Township High School	6 ft 1 in (1.85 m)	N/A	Sep 25, 2016
Tray Buchanan; PG	Recruit ratings: Scout: Rivals: (NR)				
Aanen Moody; SG	Dickinson, ND	Dickinson High School	6 ft 1 in (1.85 m)	175 lb (79 kg)	
Aanen Moody; SG	Recruit ratings: Scout: Rivals: (NR)				
Overall recruit ranking:
Note: In many cases, Scout, Rivals, 247Sports, On3, and ESPN may conflict in their listings of height and weight.; In these cases, the average was taken. ESPN grades are on a 100-point scale.; Sources: "2017 Team Ranking". Rivals.

== Roster ==
2017–18 North Dakota Fighting Hawks men's basketball team
Players
Coaches

Pos.	#	Name	Height	Weight	Year	Previous school	Hometown
G	0	Geno Crandall	6 ft 3 in (1.91 m)	180 lb (82 kg)	RS Jr	DeLaSalle	Minneapolis, MN
G	1	Marlon Stewart	6 ft 3 in (1.91 m)	200 lb (91 kg)	RS So	North Scott; Creighton	Eldridge, IA
F	2	Josh Collins	6 ft 6 in (1.98 m)	230 lb (104 kg)	Jr	DeLaSalle	Minneapolis, MN
G	3	Billy Brown	6 ft 3 in (1.91 m)	195 lb (88 kg)	So	Spirit Lake	Spirit Lake, IA
G	5	Aanen Moody	6 ft 3 in (1.91 m)	175 lb (79 kg)	Fr	Dickinson	Dickinson, ND
G	10	Jaqwan McCauley	6 ft 6 in (1.98 m)	215 lb (98 kg)	Jr	New Hope Academy; Tyler JC	High Point, NC
G	11	Jafar Kinsley	6 ft 2 in (1.88 m)	185 lb (84 kg)	Jr	Jamesville-DeWitt; Des Moines Area CC	Syracuse, NY
F	13	Dale Jones	6 ft 8 in (2.03 m)	225 lb (102 kg)	RS Sr	Waterloo West; Iowa	Waterloo, IA
G	15	Cortez Seales	6 ft 4 in (1.93 m)	190 lb (86 kg)	Jr	North Scott	Eldridge, IA
G	21	Ethan Igbanugo (W)	6 ft 1 in (1.85 m)	185 lb (84 kg)	Fr	Lakeville North	Lakeville, MN
F	22	Carter Brooks (W)	6 ft 7 in (2.01 m)	210 lb (95 kg)	So	Lakeville North	Lakeville, MN
F	23	Kienan Walter	6 ft 8 in (2.03 m)	190 lb (86 kg)	So	King's Way Christian	Vancouver, WA
F	24	Garrett Franken	6 ft 7 in (2.01 m)	195 lb (88 kg)	Fr	Atlantic HS	Atlantic, IA
G	30	Tray Buchanan	6 ft 1 in (1.85 m)	180 lb (82 kg)	Fr	United Township	East Moline, IL
F	32	Conner Avants	6 ft 7 in (2.01 m)	235 lb (107 kg)	Jr	Deer Creek	Edmond, OK

Head coach

- Brian Jones (Northern Iowa)

Assistant coach(es)

- Brad Davidson
- Steve Grabowski (Minot State)
- Jeff Horner (Iowa)

Legend

- (C) Team captain
- (S) Suspended
- (I) Ineligible
- (W) Walk-on
- Injured
- Current redshirt

Roster

== Schedule and results ==
Date time, TV	Rank^{#}	Opponent^{#}	Result	Record	Site (attendance) city, state
Regular season
Nov 10, 2017*; 8:30 pm		vs. Troy; Rainbow Classic	W 83–80	1–0	Stan Sheriff Center (5,764); Honolulu, HI
Nov 12, 2017*; 9:00 pm		at Hawaii; Rainbow Classic	L 78–81	1–1	Stan Sheriff Center (5,180); Honolulu, HI
Nov 13, 2017*; 8:30 pm		vs. Arkansas–Pine Bluff; Rainbow Classic	W 80–71	2–1	Stan Sheriff Center (5,078); Honolulu, HI
Nov 19, 2017*; 1:00 pm, BTN		at Nebraska	L 70–92	2–2	Pinnacle Bank Arena (10,249); Lincoln, NE
Nov 21, 2017*; 7:00 pm		Northland College	W 79–48	3–2	Betty Engelstad Sioux Center (1,570); Grand Forks, ND
Nov 25, 2017*; 2:00 pm		Utah Valley	L 75–83 ^{OT}	3–3	Betty Engelstad Sioux Center (1,669); Grand Forks, ND
Nov 28, 2017*; 7:00 pm		Presentation College	W 82–75	4–3	Betty Engelstad Sioux Center (1,614); Grand Forks, ND
Dec 5, 2017*; 7:00 pm, FS2		at Creighton	L 68–111	4–4	CenturyLink Center (15,069); Omaha, NE
Dec 9, 2017*; 7:00 pm		North Dakota State	L 79–88	4–5	Betty Engelstad Sioux Center (3,057); Grand Forks, ND
Dec 12, 2017*; 7:00 pm, MidcoSN		at South Dakota State	L 63–99	4–6	Frost Arena (1,874); Brookings, SD
Dec 16, 2017*; 7:00 pm, RTNW		at No. 12 Gonzaga	L 83–89 ^{OT}	4–7	McCarthey Athletic Center (6,000); Spokane, WA
Dec 29, 2017; 7:00 pm, MidcoSN		Idaho	L 57–74	4–8 (0–1)	Betty Engelstad Sioux Center (1,597); Grand Forks, ND
Dec 31, 2017; 4:00 pm, MidcoSN		Eastern Washington	L 64–77	4–9 (0–2)	Betty Engelstad Sioux Center (1,548); Grand Forks, ND
Jan 4, 2018; 8:00 pm		at Montana	L 79–109	4–10 (0–3)	Dahlberg Arena (3,220); Missoula, MT
Jan 6, 2018; 3:00 pm		at Montana State	L 68–79	4–11 (0–4)	Brick Breeden Fieldhouse (2,883); Bozeman, MT
Jan 11, 2018; 7:00 pm		Idaho State	W 81–58	5–11 (1–4)	Betty Engelstad Sioux Center (1,707); Grand Forks, ND
Jan 13, 2018; 2:00 pm, MidcoSN		Weber State	W 89–79	6–11 (2–4)	Betty Engelstad Sioux Center (2,188); Grand Forks, ND
Jan 16, 2018*; 7:00 pm, MidcoSN		North Dakota State	W 86–77	7–11	Scheels Arena (4,105); Fargo, ND
Jan 20, 2018; 8:00 pm		at Northern Colorado	L 91–94 ^{OT}	7–12 (2–5)	Bank of Colorado Arena (2,059); Greeley, CO
Jan 25, 2018; 8:00 pm		at Eastern Washington	L 71–95	7–13 (2–6)	Reese Court (1,679); Cheney, WA
Jan 27, 2018; 9:00 pm		at Idaho	L 71–96	7–14 (2–7)	Cowan Spectrum (1,818); Moscow, ID
Feb 1, 2018; 7:00 pm		Montana State	W 75–74	8–14 (3–7)	Betty Engelstad Sioux Center (1,885); Grand Forks, ND
Feb 3, 2018; 4:00 pm, ELVN		Montana	L 67–72	8–15 (3–8)	Betty Engelstad Sioux Center (2,089); Grand Forks, ND
Feb 8, 2018; 8:00 pm		at Weber State	L 76–84	8–16 (3–9)	Dee Events Center (6,275); Ogden, UT
Feb 10, 2018; 8:00 pm		at Idaho State	L 67–82	8–17 (3–10)	Holt Arena (1,708); Pocatello, ID
Feb 15, 2018; 7:00 pm, MidcoSN		Southern Utah	W 61–57	9–17 (4–10)	Betty Engelstad Sioux Center (1,456); Grand Forks, ND
Feb 17, 2018; 4:00 pm		Northern Arizona	W 86–81 ^{OT}	10–17 (5–10)	Betty Engelstad Sioux Center (1,970); Grand Forks, ND
Feb 24, 2018; 3:00 pm		Northern Colorado	L 66–79	10–18 (5–11)	Betty Engelstad Sioux Center (1,895); Grand Forks, ND
Mar 1, 2018; 9:00 pm		at Sacramento State	W 90–73	11–18 (6–11)	Hornets Nest (501); Sacramento, CA
Mar 3, 2018; 3:00 pm		at Portland State	L 90–97 ^{OT}	11–19 (6–12)	Pamplin Sports Center (715); Portland, OR
Big Sky tournament
Mar 6, 2018; 12:00 pm, Pluto TV	(8)	vs. (9) Montana State; First round	W 76–74	12–19	Reno Events Center (986); Reno, NV
Mar 8, 2018; 12:00 pm, ELVN	(8)	vs. (1) Montana; Quarterfinals	L 76–84	12–20	Reno Events Center (1,110); Reno, NV
*Non-conference game. ^{#}Rankings from AP Poll. (#) Tournament seedings in parentheses. All times are in Central Time Source.
