= 2017–18 Montana State Bobcats men's basketball team =

American college basketball season

2017–18 Montana State Bobcats men's basketball
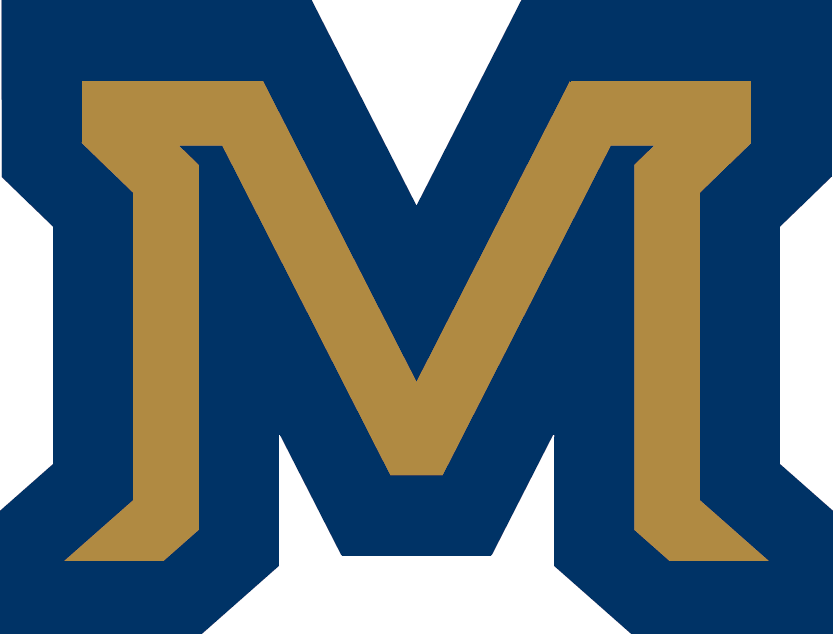

Cancún Challenge Mayan Division champions
- Conference: Big Sky Conference
- Record: 13–19 (6–12 Big Sky)
- Head coach: Brian Fish (4th season)
- Assistant coaches: Chris Haslam; Brandon Lincoln; Eric Jackson
- Home arena: Brick Breeden Fieldhouse

2017–18 Big Sky men's basketball standings
	Conf.				Overall
Team	W		L	PCT	W		L	PCT
Montana †	16	–	2	.889	26	–	8	.765
Idaho	14	–	4	.778	22	–	9	.710
Weber State	13	–	5	.722	20	–	11	.645
Eastern Washington	13	–	5	.722	20	–	15	.571
Northern Colorado	11	–	7	.611	26	–	12	.684
Idaho State	9	–	9	.500	14	–	16	.467
Portland State	9	–	9	.500	20	–	14	.588
Montana State	6	–	12	.333	13	–	19	.406
North Dakota	6	–	12	.333	12	–	20	.375
Southern Utah	5	–	13	.278	13	–	19	.406
Sacramento State	4	–	14	.222	7	–	25	.219
Northern Arizona	2	–	16	.111	5	–	27	.156
† Conference tournament winner

The 2017–18 Montana State Bobcats men's basketball team represented Montana State University during the 2017–18 NCAA Division I men's basketball season. The Bobcats, led by fourth-year head coach Brian Fish, played their home games at Brick Breeden Fieldhouse in Bozeman, Montana as members of the Big Sky Conference. They finished the season 13–19, 6–12 in Big Sky play to finish in a tie for eighth place. They lost in the first round of the Big Sky tournament to North Dakota.

== Previous season ==
The Bobcats finished the 2016–17 season 16–16, 11–7 in Big Sky play to finish in a tie for fifth place. As the No. 6 seed in the Big Sky tournament, they lost in the first round to Southern Utah.

== Offseason ==
=== Departures ===
Name	Number	Pos.	Height	Weight	Year	Hometown	Reason for departure
Sarp Gobeloglu	13	F	6'10"	205	Senior	Ankara, Turkey	Graduated
Mandrell Worthy	15	G	6'2"	180	RS freshman	Federal Way, Washington	Graduate transferred to Azusa Pacific
Dallas Lussier	23	G	6'1"	190	Junior	Livingston, Montana	Walk-on; left the team for personal reasons
Quinton Everett	24	G	6'3"	195	Senior	Lakeland, Florida	Graduated
Cooper Olson	30	G	6'1"	170	RS senior	Westby, Montana	Walk-on; left the team for personal reasons

=== 2017 incoming recruits ===
College recruiting
Name	Hometown	School	Height	Weight	Commit date
Isaac Bonton #81 PG	Portland, Oregon	Parkrose High School	6 ft 2 in (1.88 m)	175 lb (79 kg)	Sep 21, 2016
Isaac Bonton #81 PG	Recruit ratings: Scout: Rivals: (64)				
Luke Schultz; PF	Kerrville, Texas	Our Lady of the Hills High School	6 ft 10 in (2.08 m)	235 lb (107 kg)	Oct 3, 2016
Luke Schultz; PF	Recruit ratings: Scout: Rivals: (NR)				
Lassi Nikkarinen; PG	Helsinki, Finland	HBA Märsky	6 ft 1 in (1.85 m)	180 lb (82 kg)	May 1, 2017
Lassi Nikkarinen; PG	Recruit ratings: Scout: Rivals: (NR)				
Overall recruit ranking:
Note: In many cases, Scout, Rivals, 247Sports, On3, and ESPN may conflict in their listings of height and weight.; In these cases, the average was taken. ESPN grades are on a 100-point scale.; Sources: "2017 Team Ranking". Rivals.

=== 2018 incoming recruits ===
College recruiting (2018)
Name	Hometown	School	Height	Weight	Commit date
Jared Martin #75 SF	Scottsdale, Arizona	Prolific Prep	6 ft 5 in (1.96 m)	185 lb (84 kg)	Sep 10, 2017
Jared Martin #75 SF	Recruit ratings: Scout: Rivals: (65)				
Overall recruit ranking:
Note: In many cases, Scout, Rivals, 247Sports, On3, and ESPN may conflict in their listings of height and weight.; In these cases, the average was taken. ESPN grades are on a 100-point scale.; Sources: "2017 Team Ranking". Rivals.

== Preseason ==
In separate preseason polls of league coaches and media, the Bobcats were picked to finish in fourth place (tied for fourth in coaches poll) in the Big Sky. Junior guard Tyler Hall was named the preseason Big Sky MVP.

== Roster ==
2017–18 Montana State Bobcats men's basketball team
Players
Coaches

Pos.	#	Name	Height	Weight	Year	Previous school	Hometown
G	0	Zach Green	6 ft 4 in (1.93 m)	195 lb (88 kg)	Sr	Mesquite	Gilbert, Arizona
F	1	Joe Mvuezolo, Jr.	6 ft 6 in (1.98 m)	180 lb (82 kg)	Sr	Barking Abbey; Miami Dade College	London, England
F	2	Keljin Blevins	6 ft 6 in (1.98 m)	200 lb (91 kg)	RS Jr	Bishop O'Connell; Southern Miss	Hot Springs, Arkansas
G	3	Tyler Hall	6 ft 4 in (1.93 m)	175 lb (79 kg)	Jr	Rock Island	Rock Island, Illinois
F	4	Sam Neumann	6 ft 7 in (2.01 m)	200 lb (91 kg)	Jr	Cretin-Derham Hall	Saint Paul, Minnesota
G	5	Harald Frey	6 ft 1 in (1.85 m)	150 lb (68 kg)	So	Wang Sports Academy	Oslo, Norway
G	10	Devonte Klines	6 ft 2 in (1.88 m)	185 lb (84 kg)	Jr	Santa Margarita; Saddleback College	Rancho Santa Margarita, California
G	13	Isaac Bonton	6 ft 2 in (1.88 m)	175 lb (79 kg)	Fr	Parkrose	Portland, Oregon
F	21	Benson Osayande	6 ft 9 in (2.06 m)	200 lb (91 kg)	Sr	Franklin; Casper College	Elk Grove, California
G	22	Konner Frey	6 ft 6 in (1.98 m)	200 lb (91 kg)	RS Sr	Viewmont; Utah Valley	Bountiful, Utah
C	31	Devin Kirby	6 ft 10 in (2.08 m)	215 lb (98 kg)	So	Basha	Chandler, Arizona
G	33	Lassi Nikkarinen	6 ft 2 in (1.88 m)	180 lb (82 kg)	Fr	Mäkelänrinne	Helsinki, Finland
C	44	Luke Schultz	6 ft 11 in (2.11 m)	230 lb (104 kg)	Fr	Our Lady of the Hills	Fredericksburg, Texas

Head coach

- Brian Fish (Marshall)

Assistant coach(es)

- Chris Haslam (Wyoming)
- Brandon Lincoln (Oregon)
- Eric Jackson (Green Bay)

Legend

- (C) Team captain
- (S) Suspended
- (I) Ineligible
- (W) Walk-on
- Injured
- Current redshirt

Roster

== Schedule and results ==
Date time, TV	Rank^{#}	Opponent^{#}	Result	Record	Site (attendance) city, state
Canada exhibition trip
Aug 10, 2017*; 7:00 pm		at Calgary	W 91–71		Jack Simpson Gymnasium; Calgary, AB
Aug 11, 2017*; 7:00 pm		vs. Alberta	W 78–69		Jack Simpson Gymnasium; Calgary, AB
Aug 12, 2017*; 3:00 pm		at Calgary	W 77–70		Jack Simpson Gymnasium; Calgary, AB
Aug 13, 2017*; 1:00 pm		vs. Alberta	L 78–97		Jack Simpson Gymnasium; Calgary, AB
Exhibition
Nov 1, 2017*; 8:00 pm		MSU Northern	W 78–73		Brick Breeden Fieldhouse (1,242); Bozeman, MT
Non-conference regular season
Nov 10, 2017*; 6:00 pm		vs. Omaha; Great Falls Showcase	W 89–80	1–0	Pacific Steel Arena (4,307); Great Falls, MT
Nov 13, 2017*; 7:00 pm		at Utah State	L 73–81	1–1	Smith Spectrum (7,154); Logan, UT
Nov 15, 2017*; 8:00 pm		Montana Western	W 109–81	2–1	Brick Breeden Fieldhouse (1,812); Bozeman, MT
Nov 18, 2017*; 6:00 pm		at Louisiana Tech; Cancún Challenge	L 58–71	2–2	Thomas Assembly Center (2,378); Ruston, LA
Nov 21, 2017*; 10:30 am		vs. Binghamton; Cancún Challenge Mayan Division semifinals	W 74–64	3–2	Hard Rock Hotel Riviera Convention Center; Cancún, Mexico
Nov 22, 2017*; 12:30 pm		vs. Southeast Missouri State; Cancún Challenge Mayan Division finals	W 88–82	4–2	Hard Rock Hotel Riviera Convention Center; Cancún, Mexico
Nov 26, 2017*; 1:00 pm		at Fresno State; Cancún Challenge	L 67–80	4–3	Save Mart Center (5,097); Fresno, CA
Nov 29, 2017*; 7:00 pm		Bethesda	W 98–61	5–3	Brick Breeden Fieldhouse (1,502); Bozeman, MT
Dec 2, 2017*; 2:00 pm		at Milwaukee	W 68–64	6–3	UW–Milwaukee Panther Arena (1,596); Milwaukee, WI
Dec 5, 2017*; 5:00 pm, ESPN3		at Central Michigan	L 48–75	6–4	McGuirk Arena (2,092); Mount Pleasant, MI
Dec 9, 2017*; 2:00 pm		UC Santa Barbara	L 69–91	6–5	Brick Breeden Fieldhouse (2,271); Bozeman, MT
Dec 18, 2017*; 7:00 pm		Denver	W 79–65	7–5	Brick Breeden Fieldhouse (2,200); Bozeman, MT
Dec 21, 2017*; 6:00 pm		at Omaha	L 71–84	7–6	Baxter Arena (2,033); Omaha, NE
Big Sky regular season
Dec 28, 2017; 6:30 pm		at Southern Utah	W 104–99	8–6 (1–0)	America First Events Center (1,472); Cedar City, UT
Dec 30, 2017; 5:00 pm		at Northern Arizona	W 76–73	9–6 (2–0)	Walkup Skydome (681); Flagstaff, AZ
Jan 4, 2018; 7:00 pm		Northern Colorado	W 76–64	10–6 (3–0)	Brick Breeden Fieldhouse (2,542); Bozeman, MT
Jan 6, 2018; 2:00 pm		North Dakota	W 79–68	11–6 (4–0)	Brick Breeden Fieldhouse (2,883); Bozeman, MT
Jan 11, 2018; 9:00 pm		at Portland State	L 74–93	11–7 (4–1)	Pamplin Sports Center (787); Portland, OR
Jan 13, 2018; 8:00 pm		at Sacramento State	L 68–87	11–8 (4–2)	Hornets Nest (702); Sacramento, CA
Jan 20, 2018; 7:00 pm, SWX MT		Montana	L 52–67	11–9 (4–3)	Brick Breeden Fieldhouse (6,772); Bozeman, MT
Jan 25, 2018; 7:00 pm		Northern Arizona	L 75–77	11–10 (4–4)	Brick Breeden Fieldhouse (2,709); Bozeman, MT
Jan 27, 2018; 2:00 pm		Southern Utah	W 69–66	12–10 (5–4)	Brick Breeden Fieldhouse (2,851); Bozeman, MT
Feb 1, 2018; 6:00 pm		at North Dakota	L 74–75	12–11 (5–5)	Betty Engelstad Sioux Center (1,885); Grand Forks, ND
Feb 3, 2018; 2:00 pm		at Northern Colorado	L 63–86	12–12 (5–6)	Bank of Colorado Arena (1,617); Greeley, CO
Feb 8, 2018; 2:00 pm		Sacramento State	W 92–76	13–12 (6–6)	Brick Breeden Fieldhouse (2,703); Bozeman, MT
Feb 10, 2018; 2:00 pm		Portland State	L 77–80	13–13 (6–7)	Brick Breeden Fieldhouse (2,915); Bozeman, MT
Feb 15, 2018; 2:00 pm		at Idaho	L 78–88	13–14 (6–8)	Cowan Spectrum (1,019); Moscow, ID
Feb 17, 2018; 3:00 pm, ELVN		at Eastern Washington	L 79–84	13–15 (6–9)	Reese Court (1,804); Cheney, WA
Feb 24, 2018; 7:00 pm, SWX MT		at Montana	L 63–90	13–16 (6–10)	Dahlberg Arena (7,256); Missoula, MT
Mar 1, 2018; 7:00 pm		Idaho State	L 78–101	13–17 (6–11)	Brick Breeden Fieldhouse (2,872); Bozeman, MT
Mar 3, 2018; 2:00 pm, ELVN		Weber State	L 92–95 ^{OT}	13–18 (6–12)	Brick Breeden Fieldhouse (7,250); Bozeman, MT
Big Sky tournament
Mar 6, 2018; 12:00 pm, Pluto TV	(9)	vs. (8) North Dakota; First round	L 74–76	13–19	Reno Events Center (986); Reno, NV
*Non-conference game. ^{#}Rankings from AP Poll. (#) Tournament seedings in parentheses. All times are in Mountain Time.

== See also ==
- 2017–18 Montana State Bobcats women's basketball team
