= 2017–18 Northern Arizona Lumberjacks men's basketball team =

American college basketball season

2017–18 Northern Arizona Lumberjacks men's basketball
- Conference: Big Sky Conference
- Record: 5–27 (2–16 Big Sky)
- Head coach: Jack Murphy (6th season)
- Assistant coaches: Matt Dunn; Wes Pifer; Jason Sanchez
- Home arena: Walkup Skydome

2017–18 Big Sky men's basketball standings
	Conf.				Overall
Team	W		L	PCT	W		L	PCT
Montana †	16	–	2	.889	26	–	8	.765
Idaho	14	–	4	.778	22	–	9	.710
Weber State	13	–	5	.722	20	–	11	.645
Eastern Washington	13	–	5	.722	20	–	15	.571
Northern Colorado	11	–	7	.611	26	–	12	.684
Idaho State	9	–	9	.500	14	–	16	.467
Portland State	9	–	9	.500	20	–	14	.588
Montana State	6	–	12	.333	13	–	19	.406
North Dakota	6	–	12	.333	12	–	20	.375
Southern Utah	5	–	13	.278	13	–	19	.406
Sacramento State	4	–	14	.222	7	–	25	.219
Northern Arizona	2	–	16	.111	5	–	27	.156
† Conference tournament winner

The 2017–18 Northern Arizona Lumberjacks men's basketball team represented Northern Arizona University during the 2017–18 NCAA Division I men's basketball season. The Lumberjacks were led by sixth-year head coach Jack Murphy and played their home games at the Walkup Skydome in Flagstaff, Arizona as members of the Big Sky Conference. They finished the season 5–27, 2–16 in Big Sky play to finish in last place. They lost in the first round of the Big Sky tournament to Northern Colorado.

== Previous season ==
The Lumberjacks finished the 2016–17 season 9–23, 6–12 in Big Sky play to finish in 10th place. Due to Northern Colorado's self-imposed postseason ban, the Lumberjacks were the No. 9 seed in the Big Sky tournament where the lost in the first round to Portland State.

== Offseason ==
=== Departures ===
Name	Number	Pos.	Height	Weight	Year	Hometown	Reason for departure
Majestic Tejada	1	G	6'0"	180	Sophomore	Hollywood, FL	Transferred
Mike Green	5	G	5'10"	155	Sophomore	Fort Lauderdale, FL	Transferred
Jaleni Neely	10	G	6'0"	170	RS Senior	Chicago, IL	Graduated
Ako Kaluna	11	F/C	6'7"	295	Senior	Valencia, CA	Graduated
Felix Rivera-Vega	13	F	6'6"	190	Sophomore	Hollywood, FL	Transferred to Georgetown College
Raynard Robinson	14	F	6'8"	230	Freshman	Deerfield Beach, FL	Left the team for personal reasons
Steven Stanley	20	F	6'7"	210	Sophomore	Phoenix, AZ	Walk-on; didn't return
Travis Rice	30	G	6'2"	170	Freshman	Las Vegas, NV	Transferred
Jordyn Martin	34	F	6'7"	210	RS Senior	Las Vegas, NV	Graduated
Marcus DeBerry	41	G	6'5"	155	Sophomore	Union City, TN	Transferred to Fort Wayne

=== Incoming transfers ===
Name	Number	Pos.	Height	Weight	Year	Hometown	Previous School
Gino Littles	3	G	6'0"	160	Senior	Phoenix, AZ	Transferred from UTSA. Will be eligible to play immediately since Littles graduated from UTSA.
Malcolm Allen	10	G	6'1"	180	RS Senior	Las Vegas, NV	Transferred from Stanford. Will be eligible to play immediately since Allen graduated from Stanford.

=== 2017 incoming recruits ===
College recruiting information
Name	Hometown	School	Height	Weight	Commit date
Carlos Hines; SG	Chicago, IL	North Lawndale College Prep High School	5 ft 11 in (1.80 m)	N/A	
Carlos Hines; SG	Recruit ratings: Scout: Rivals: (NR)				
Lenell Henry; PF	Chicago, IL	Morgan Park High School	6 ft 10 in (2.08 m)	N/A	
Lenell Henry; PF	Recruit ratings: Scout: Rivals: (NR)				
Overall recruit ranking:
Note: In many cases, Scout, Rivals, 247Sports, On3, and ESPN may conflict in their listings of height and weight.; In these cases, the average was taken. ESPN grades are on a 100-point scale.; Sources: "2017 Team Ranking". Rivals.

== Roster ==
2017–18 Northern Arizona Lumberjacks men's basketball team
Players
Coaches

Pos.	#	Name	Height	Weight	Year	Previous school	Hometown
G	0	Torry Johnson	6 ft 3 in (1.91 m)	165 lb (75 kg)	RS Jr	Morgan Park HS	Chicago, IL
G	1	Carlos Hines	6 ft 4 in (1.93 m)	171 lb (78 kg)	Fr	North Lawndale Prep HS	Chicago, IL
F	2	Corey Brown	6 ft 8 in (2.03 m)	225 lb (102 kg)	Jr	McArthur HS	Hollywood, FL
G	3	Gino Littles	6 ft 1 in (1.85 m)	165 lb (75 kg)	RS Sr	UTSA	Phoenix, AZ
G	4	JoJo Anderson	6 ft 3 in (1.91 m)	170 lb (77 kg)	So	22 Feet Academy	Houston, TX
G	5	Omar Ndiaye (W)	6 ft 1 in (1.85 m)	165 lb (75 kg)	Jr	Monte de Sol HS	Santa Fe, NM
G	10	Malcolm Allen	6 ft 3 in (1.91 m)	185 lb (84 kg)	RS Sr	Stanford	Las Vegas, NV
G	12	Kye de Laveaga (W)	6 ft 1 in (1.85 m)	190 lb (86 kg)	Sr	Westwind Prep	Scottsdale, AZ
G	14	Karl Harris	6 ft 5 in (1.96 m)	185 lb (84 kg)	Jr	Indian Hills CC	Chicago, IL
F	15	Nik Mains	6 ft 8 in (2.03 m)	195 lb (88 kg)	Fr	Pinnacle HS	Phoenix, AZ
G	21	Luke Avdalovic	6 ft 4 in (1.93 m)	185 lb (84 kg)	Fr	Vista del Lago HS	Folsom, CA
F	22	Brooks DeBisschop	6 ft 9 in (2.06 m)	230 lb (104 kg)	So	West Linn HS	West Linn, OR
F	23	Lenell Henry	6 ft 8 in (2.03 m)	205 lb (93 kg)	Fr	Morgan Park HS	Chicago, IL
G/F	32	Chris Bowling	6 ft 7 in (2.01 m)	175 lb (79 kg)	So	Gilbert HS	Gilbert, AZ
F	33	Isaiah Thomas	6 ft 9 in (2.06 m)	220 lb (100 kg)	Jr	Bishop O'Dowd HS	Oakland, CA
G/F	35	Aziz Seck	6 ft 7 in (2.01 m)	185 lb (84 kg)	So	Army & Navy Academy	Dakar, Senegal
F	55	Ruben Fuamba	6 ft 9 in (2.06 m)	230 lb (104 kg)	Sr	Central CC	Congo

Head coach

- Jack Murphy (Arizona)

Assistant coach(es)

- Matt Dunn (Fort Hays State)
- Wes Pifer (Penn State Altoona)
- Jason Sanchez (Mobile)

Legend

- (C) Team captain
- (S) Suspended
- (I) Ineligible
- (W) Walk-on
- Injured
- Current redshirt

Roster

== Schedule and results ==
Date time, TV	Rank^{#}	Opponent^{#}	Result	Record	Site (attendance) city, state
Non-conference regular season
Nov 10, 2017*; 6:00 pm, P12N		at No. 3 Arizona	L 67–101	0–1	McKale Center (14,644); Tucson, AZ
Nov 13, 2017*; 6:30 pm, FSAZ		Embry-Riddle (AZ)	L 70–82	0–2	Rolle Activity Center (713); Flagstaff, AZ
Nov 17, 2017*; 6:00 pm, P12N		at Arizona State; Las Vegas Invitational	L 62–97	0–3	Wells Fargo Arena (6,189); Tempe, AZ
Nov 20, 2017*; 6:00 pm, FSKC		at Kansas State; Las Vegas Invitational	L 58–80	0–4	Bramlage Coliseum (6,112); Manhattan, KS
Nov 23, 2017*; 12:00 pm		vs. Hampton; Las Vegas Invitational visitor's bracket semifinals	L 66–76	0–5	Orleans Arena (3,245); Paradise, NV
Nov 24, 2017*; 12:00 pm		vs. UC Irvine; Las Vegas Invitational visitor's bracket 3rd place game	L 71–77	0–6	Orleans Arena (3,325); Las Vegas, NV
Nov 30, 2017*; 8:00 pm, THEW.TV		at Santa Clara	L 57–89	0–7	Leavey Center (1,263); Santa Clara, CA
Dec 2, 2017*; 8:00 pm, ESPN3		at Cal State Bakersfield	W 60–52	1–7	Icardo Center (2,509); Bakersfield, CA
Dec 6, 2017*; 6:30 pm, FSAZ+/Pluto TV		San Diego Christian	W 79–70	2–7	Rolle Activity Center; Flagstaff, AZ
Dec 9, 2017*; 8:00 pm, FSAZ+		at San Diego	L 51–79	2–8	Jenny Craig Pavilion (1,420); San Diego, CA
Dec 14, 2017*; 6:30 pm, Pluto TV		South Dakota	L 77–90	2–9	Rolle Activity Center (256); Flagstaff, AZ
Dec 18, 2017*; 5:00 pm		at South Florida	L 56–70	2–10	USF Sun Dome (2,016); Tampa, FL
Dec 20, 2017*; 5:00 pm, ESPN3		at Jacksonville	W 83–72	3–10	Swisher Gymnasium (603); Jacksonville, FL
Big Sky regular season
Dec 28, 2017; 6:30 pm, Pluto TV		Montana	L 69–87	3–11 (0–1)	Walkup Skydome (604); Flagstaff, AZ
Dec 30, 2018; 5:00 pm, CW6/Pluto TV		Montana State	L 73–76 ^{OT}	3–12 (0–2)	Walkup Skydome (681); Flagstaff, AZ
Jan 4, 2018; 7:00 pm, Pluto TV		at Weber State	L 55–95	3–13 (0–3)	Dee Events Center (6,272); Ogden, UT
Jan 6, 2018; 7:00 pm, Pluto TV		at Idaho State	L 60–64	3–14 (0–4)	Holt Arena (1,625); Pocatello, ID
Jan 13, 2018; 2:00 pm, ELVN/Pluto TV		at Southern Utah	L 75–81	3–15 (0–5)	America First Events Center (2,784); Cedar City, UT
Jan 18, 2018; 6:30 pm, Pluto TV		Eastern Washington	L 76–81	3–16 (0–6)	Walkup Skydome (1,017); Flagstaff, AZ
Jan 20, 2018; 5:00 pm, CW6/Pluto TV		Idaho	L 80–84	3–17 (0–7)	Walkup Skydome (832); Flagstaff, AZ
Jan 25, 2018; 7:00 pm, Pluto TV		at Montana State	W 77–75	4–17 (1–7)	Brick Breeden Fieldhouse (2,709); Bozeman, MT
Jan 27, 2018; 7:00 pm, Pluto TV		at Montana	L 64–82	4–18 (1–8)	Dahlberg Arena (5,108); Missoula, MT
Feb 1, 2018; 6:30 pm, Pluto TV		Idaho State	L 61–63	4–19 (1–9)	Walkup Skydome (955); Flagstaff, AZ
Feb 3, 2018; 7:00 pm, CW6/Pluto TV		Weber State	L 55–87	4–20 (1–10)	Walkup Skydome (622); Flagstaff, AZ
Feb 10, 2018; 2:00 pm, CW6/Pluto TV		Southern Utah	L 54–63	4–21 (1–11)	Walkup Skydome (405); Flagstaff, AZ
Feb 15, 2018; 7:00 pm, Pluto TV		at Northern Colorado	L 60–95	4–22 (1–12)	Bank of Colorado Arena (1,524); Greeley, CO
Feb 17, 2018; 3:00 pm, Pluto TV		at North Dakota	L 81–86 ^{OT}	4–23 (1–13)	Betty Engelstad Sioux Center (1,970); Grand Forks, ND
Feb 22, 2018; 6:30 pm, Pluto TV		Sacramento State	W 58–53	5–23 (2–13)	Walkup Skydome (560); Flagstaff, AZ
Feb 24, 2018; 6:00 pm, CW6/Pluto TV		Portland State	L 66–72	5–24 (2–14)	Rolle Activity Center (831); Flagstaff, AZ
Mar 1, 2018; 6:00 pm, Pluto TV		at Idaho	L 52–66	5–25 (2–15)	Cowan Spectrum (1,269); Moscow, ID
Mar 3, 2018; 3:00 pm, Pluto TV		at Eastern Washington	L 68–85	5–26 (2–16)	Reese Court (2,032); Cheney, WA
Big Sky tournament
Mar 6, 2018; 2:30 pm, Pluto TV	(12)	vs. (5) Northern Colorado; First round	L 59–82	5–27	Reno Events Center (986); Reno, NV
*Non-conference game. ^{#}Rankings from AP Poll. (#) Tournament seedings in parentheses. All times are in Mountain Time; Source.
