= 2017–18 Montana Grizzlies basketball team =

American college basketball season

2017–18 Montana Grizzlies basketball

Big Sky regular season and tournament champions

NCAA tournament, First Round
- Conference: Big Sky Conference
- Record: 26–8 (16–2 Big Sky)
- Head coach: Travis DeCuire (4th season)
- Assistant coaches: Chris Cobb; Rachi Wortham; Jay Flores
- Home arena: Dahlberg Arena

2017–18 Big Sky men's basketball standings
	Conf.				Overall
Team	W		L	PCT	W		L	PCT
Montana †	16	–	2	.889	26	–	8	.765
Idaho	14	–	4	.778	22	–	9	.710
Weber State	13	–	5	.722	20	–	11	.645
Eastern Washington	13	–	5	.722	20	–	15	.571
Northern Colorado	11	–	7	.611	26	–	12	.684
Idaho State	9	–	9	.500	14	–	16	.467
Portland State	9	–	9	.500	20	–	14	.588
Montana State	6	–	12	.333	13	–	19	.406
North Dakota	6	–	12	.333	12	–	20	.375
Southern Utah	5	–	13	.278	13	–	19	.406
Sacramento State	4	–	14	.222	7	–	25	.219
Northern Arizona	2	–	16	.111	5	–	27	.156
† Conference tournament winner

The 2017–18 Montana Grizzlies basketball team represented the University of Montana during the 2017–18 NCAA Division I men's basketball season. The Grizzlies, led by fourth-year head coach Travis DeCuire, played their home games at Dahlberg Arena in Missoula, Montana as members of the Big Sky Conference. They finished the season 26–8, 16–2 in Big Sky play to win the Big Sky regular season championship. They defeated North Dakota, Northern Colorado, and Eastern Washington to be champions of the Big Sky tournament. They earned the Big Sky's automatic bid to the NCAA tournament where they lost in the first round to Michigan.

== Previous season ==
The Grizzlies finished the 2016–17 season 16–16, 11–7 in Big Sky play to finish in a tie for fifth place. As the No. 5 seed in the Big Sky tournament, they lost to Idaho in the quarterfinals.

== Offseason ==
=== Departures ===
Name	Number	Pos.	Height	Weight	Year	Hometown	Reason for departure
Mario Dunn Jr.	1	G	6'0"	185	Senior	Oakland, CA	Graduated
Walter Wright	5	G	5'10"	161	Senior	Waterbury, CT	Graduated
Alphonso Anderson	10	F	6'6"	218	Freshman	Tacoma, WA	Transferred to Moberly Area CC
Gavin DeJong	30	F	6'6"	215	RS Sophomore	Manhattan, MT	Walk-on; didn't return
Jack Lopez	31	F	6'5"	208	Senior	Bankstown, Australia	Graduated
Aaron Misipeka-Ward	32	G	6'2"	198	Senior	Florence, MT	Graduated
Jared Samuelson	33	F	6'7"	213	RS Freshman	Billings, MT	Transferred to Rocky Mountain College
Brandon Gfeller	34	G	6'4"	189	Senior	Colfax, WA	Graduated

=== Incoming transfers ===
Name	Number	Pos.	Height	Weight	Year	Hometown	Previous School
Niko Bevens	3	G	6'6"	175	Sophomore	Beaverton, OR	Junior college transferred from North Idaho College

=== 2017 recruiting class ===
College recruiting information
Name	Hometown	School	Height	Weight	Commit date
Timmy Falls #63 SG	Dublin, CA	Dublin High School	6 ft 2 in (1.88 m)	170 lb (77 kg)	Feb 20, 2016
Timmy Falls #63 SG	Recruit ratings: Scout: Rivals: (69)				
Joirdon Nicholas; SF	Pearland, TX	Glenda Dawson High School	6 ft 7 in (2.01 m)	N/A	Sep 16, 2016
Joirdon Nicholas; SF	Recruit ratings: Scout: Rivals: (NR)				
Kelby Kramer; C	Rock Springs, WY	Rock Springs High School	6 ft 10 in (2.08 m)	210 lb (95 kg)	Oct 31, 2016
Kelby Kramer; C	Recruit ratings: Scout: Rivals: (NR)				
Overall recruit ranking:
Note: In many cases, Scout, Rivals, 247Sports, On3, and ESPN may conflict in their listings of height and weight.; In these cases, the average was taken. ESPN grades are on a 100-point scale.; Sources: "2017 Team Ranking". Rivals.

== Roster ==
2017–18 Montana Grizzlies men's basketball team
Players
Coaches

Pos.	#	Name	Height	Weight	Year	Previous school	Hometown
G	0	Michael Oguine	6 ft 2 in (1.88 m)	171 lb (78 kg)	Jr	Chaminade Prep	Porter Ranch, CA
G	1	Timmy Falls	6 ft 2 in (1.88 m)	171 lb (78 kg)	Fr	Dublin	Dublin, CA
F	2	Donaven Dorsey	6 ft 7 in (2.01 m)	214 lb (97 kg)	RS Jr	Timberline; Washington	Lacey, WA
G	3	Niko Bevens	6 ft 6 in (1.98 m)	214 lb (97 kg)	So	Beaverton; North Idaho	Beaverton, OR
G	4	Sayeed Pridgett	6 ft 5 in (1.96 m)	195 lb (88 kg)	So	El Cerrito	Oakland, CA
F	5	Joirdon Nicholas	6 ft 7 in (2.01 m)	185 lb (84 kg)	Fr	Dawson	Pearland, TX
G	10	Lars Espe	6 ft 1 in (1.85 m)	165 lb (75 kg)	Fr	Metis Videregaaende; Gimle BBK	Bergen, Norway
G	13	Trevor Spoja (W)	6 ft 3 in (1.91 m)	164 lb (74 kg)	RS So	Billings West	Billings, MT
G	14	Ahmaad Rorie	6 ft 1 in (1.85 m)	175 lb (79 kg)	RS Jr	Lincoln; Oregon	Tacoma, WA
F	15	Jamar Akoh	6 ft 8 in (2.03 m)	253 lb (115 kg)	RS Jr	Los Osos HS; Cal State Fullerton	Rancho Cucamonga, CA
F	20	Fabijan Krslovic	6 ft 8 in (2.03 m)	239 lb (108 kg)	Sr	St Aloysius	Sydney, Australia
G	24	Bobby Moorehead	6 ft 7 in (2.01 m)	182 lb (83 kg)	Jr	Stadium	Tacoma, WA
C	33	Kelby Kramer	6 ft 10 in (2.08 m)	220 lb (100 kg)	Fr	Rock Springs	Rock Springs, WY
C	40	Admir Besovic	7 ft 0 in (2.13 m)	240 lb (109 kg)	Fr	Virginia Episcopal	Sarajevo, Bosnia and Herzegovina

Head coach

- Travis DeCuire (Montana)

Assistant coach(es)

- Chris Cobb (Menlo)
- Rachi Wortham (Eastern Washington)
- Jay Flores (Chico State)

Legend

- (C) Team captain
- (S) Suspended
- (I) Ineligible
- (W) Walk-on
- Injured
- Current redshirt

Roster

== Schedule and results ==
Date time, TV	Rank^{#}	Opponent^{#}	Result	Record	Site (attendance) city, state
Exhibition
Nov 6, 2017*; 7:00 pm		Saskatchewan	W 85–44		Dahlberg Arena (2,404); Missoula, MT
Non-conference regular season
Nov 10, 2017*; 7:00 pm		Whitworth	W 72–60	1–0	Dahlberg Arena (3,056); Missoula, MT
Nov 13, 2017*; 5:00 pm, ACCNX		at Pittsburgh; Legends Classic	W 83–78 ^{OT}	2–0	Peterson Events Center (3,102); Pittsburgh, PA
Nov 15, 2017*; 5:00 pm, BTN		at Penn State; Legends Classic	L 57–70	2–1	Bryce Jordan Center (5,854); University Park, PA
Nov 20, 2017*; 6:00 pm		vs. Oral Roberts; Legends Classic visitors semifinals	W 69–64	3–1	Firestone Fieldhouse (1,682); Malibu, CA
Nov 21, 2017*; 6:00 pm		vs. UC Santa Barbara; Legends Classic visitors championship	L 73–80	3–2	Firestone Fieldhouse (1,239); Malibu, CA
Nov 26, 2017*; 7:00 pm		Carroll (MT)	W 86–75	4–2	Dahlberg Arena (2,804); Missoula, MT
Nov 29, 2017*; 8:00 pm, P12N		at Stanford	L 54–70	4–3	Maples Pavilion (3,145); Stanford, CA
Dec 3, 2017*; 7:00 pm		Cal State Northridge	W 86–68	5–3	Dahlberg Arena (2,734); Missoula, MT
Dec 6, 2017*; 9:00 pm, P12N		at UCLA; Canceled (Skirball fire)			Pauley Pavilion; Los Angeles, CA
Dec 9, 2017*; 12:00 pm		at Georgia State	L 68–71	5–4	GSU Sports Arena (1,224); Atlanta, GA
Dec 17, 2017*; 1:00 pm		UC Riverside	W 77–61	6–4	Dahlberg Arena (2,817); Missoula, MT
Dec 19, 2017*; 7:00 pm, SWX MT		UC Irvine	W 86–68	7–4	Dahlberg Arena (3,106); Missoula, MT
Dec 22, 2017*; 9:00 pm, P12N		at Washington	L 63–66	7–5	Alaska Airlines Arena (5,915); Seattle, WA
Big Sky regular season
Dec 28, 2017; 6:30 pm		at Northern Arizona	W 87–69	8–5 (1–0)	Walkup Skydome (604); Flagstaff, AZ
Dec 30, 2017; 12:30 pm		at Southern Utah	W 79–49	9–5 (2–0)	America First Events Center (1,263); Cedar City, UT
Jan 4, 2018; 7:00 pm		North Dakota	W 109–79	10–5 (3–0)	Dahlberg Arena (3,220); Missoula, MT
Jan 6, 2018; 7:00 pm		Northern Colorado	W 89–80	11–5 (4–0)	Dahlberg Arena (4,119); Missoula, MT
Jan 11, 2018; 8:00 pm		at Sacramento State	W 78–66	12–5 (5–0)	Hornets Nest (721); Sacramento, CA
Jan 13, 2018; 2:00 pm		at Portland State	W 92–89	13–5 (6–0)	Peter Stott Center (925); Portland, OR
Jan 20, 2018; 7:00 pm, SWX MT		at Montana State; Brawl of the Wild	W 67–52	14–5 (7–0)	Brick Breeden Fieldhouse (6,772); Bozeman, MT
Jan 25, 2018; 7:00 pm		Southern Utah	W 71–47	15–5 (8–0)	Dahlberg Arena (4,040); Missoula, MT
Jan 27, 2018; 7:00 pm		Northern Arizona	W 82–64	16–5 (9–0)	Dahlberg Arena (5,108); Missoula, MT
Feb 1, 2018; 7:00 pm		at Northern Colorado	W 88–79	17–5 (10–0)	Bank of Colorado Arena (1,413); Greeley, CO
Feb 3, 2018; 3:00 pm, ELVN		at North Dakota	W 72–67	18–5 (11–0)	Betty Engelstad Sioux Center (2,089); Grand Forks, ND
Feb 8, 2018; 7:00 pm		Portland State	W 80–60	19–5 (12–0)	Dahlberg Arena (4,082); Missoula, MT
Feb 10, 2018; 7:00 pm, ELVN		Sacramento State	W 71–69 ^{OT}	20–5 (13–0)	Dahlberg Arena (4,592); Missoula, MT
Feb 15, 2018; 7:00 pm		at Eastern Washington	L 65–74	20–6 (13–1)	Reese Court (2,354); Cheney, WA
Feb 17, 2018; 8:00 pm		at Idaho	L 77–79 ^{OT}	20–7 (13–2)	Cowan Spectrum (1,839); Moscow, ID
Feb 24, 2018; 7:00 pm, SWX MT		Montana State; Brawl of the Wild	W 90–63	21–7 (14–2)	Dahlberg Arena (7,256); Missoula, MT
Mar 1, 2018; 7:00 pm		Weber State	W 75–57	22–7 (15–2)	Dahlberg Arena (4,922); Missoula, MT
Mar 3, 2018; 7:00 pm		Idaho State	W 75–64	23–7 (16–2)	Dahlberg Arena (4,712); Missoula, MT
Big Sky tournament
Mar 8, 2018; 12:00 pm, ELVN	(1)	vs. (8) North Dakota; Quarterfinals	W 84–76	24–7	Reno Events Center (1,110); Reno, NV
Mar 9, 2018; 5:30 pm, ELVN	(1)	vs. (5) Northern Colorado; Semifinals	W 91–89	25–7	Reno Events Center (1,236); Reno, NV
Mar 10, 2018; 5:00 pm, ESPNU	(1)	vs. (3) Eastern Washington; Championship	W 82–65	26–7	Reno Events Center (1,378); Reno, NV
NCAA tournament
Mar 15, 2018*; 7:50 pm, TBS	(14 W)	vs. (3 W) No. 7 Michigan; First Round	L 47–61	26–8	Intrust Bank Arena (14,019); Wichita, KS
*Non-conference game. ^{#}Rankings from AP Poll. (#) Tournament seedings in parentheses. W=West. All times are in Mountain Time.

== See also ==
2017–18 Montana Lady Griz basketball team
