= 2017–18 Portland State Vikings men's basketball team =

American college basketball season

2017–18 Portland State Vikings men's basketball

CIT, Second round
- Conference: Big Sky Conference
- Record: 20–14 (9–9 Big Sky)
- Head coach: Barret Peery (1st season)
- Assistant coaches: Jase Coburn; Chris Skinkis; Kahil Fennell
- Home arena: Pamplin Sports Center (Note: Portland State is playing its home games this season at Pamplin Sports Center on the Lewis & Clark College campus as construction on the new Viking Pavilion on Portland State's campus is being completed.)

2017–18 Big Sky men's basketball standings
	Conf.				Overall
Team	W		L	PCT	W		L	PCT
Montana †	16	–	2	.889	26	–	8	.765
Idaho	14	–	4	.778	22	–	9	.710
Weber State	13	–	5	.722	20	–	11	.645
Eastern Washington	13	–	5	.722	20	–	15	.571
Northern Colorado	11	–	7	.611	26	–	12	.684
Idaho State	9	–	9	.500	14	–	16	.467
Portland State	9	–	9	.500	20	–	14	.588
Montana State	6	–	12	.333	13	–	19	.406
North Dakota	6	–	12	.333	12	–	20	.375
Southern Utah	5	–	13	.278	13	–	19	.406
Sacramento State	4	–	14	.222	7	–	25	.219
Northern Arizona	2	–	16	.111	5	–	27	.156
† Conference tournament winner

The 2017–18 Portland State Vikings men's basketball team represented Portland State University during the 2017–18 NCAA Division I men's basketball season. The Vikings, led by first-year head coach Barret Peery, played their home games at Pamplin Sports Center in Portland, Oregon, (Note: Portland State is playing its home games this season at Pamplin Sports Center on the Lewis & Clark College campus as construction on the new Viking Pavilion on Portland State's campus is being completed.) as members of the Big Sky Conference. They finished the season 20–14, 9–9 in Big Sky play to finish in a tie for sixth place. They defeated Sacramento State in the first round of the Big Sky tournament before losing in the quarterfinals to Eastern Washington. They were invited to the CollegeInsider.com Tournament where, after a first round bye, lost in the second round to San Diego.

== Previous season ==
The Vikings finished the 2016–17 season 15–16, 7–11 in Big Sky play to finish in a tie for eighth place. As the No. 8 seed in the Big Sky tournament, they defeated Northern Arizona in the first round, then lost to North Dakota in the quarterfinals.

== Offseason ==
=== Departures ===
Name	Number	Pos.	Height	Weight	Year	Hometown	Reason for departure
Zach Gengler	1	G	6'2"	180	Senior	Silverton, Oregon	Graduated
Daniel Davydov	10	G	6'0"	175	Sophomore	Bellevue, Washington	Walk-on; didn't return
Calaen Robinson	11	G	6'2"	180	RS Senior	Tempe, Arizona	Graduated
De'Sean Parsons	13	F	6'7"	195	Senior	Sacramento, California	Graduated
Khari Holloway	23	G	6'2"	185	Senior	Jackson, Mississippi	Graduated
Namdi Okonkwo	25	C	7'0"	205	Senior	Dallas, Texas	Graduate transferred to Pacific
Montie Leunen	34	F	6'4"	190	Senior	Portland, Oregon	Graduated

=== Incoming transfers ===
Name	Number	Pos.	Height	Weight	Year	Hometown	Previous School
Devyn Wilson	10	G	6'3"	175	Junior	Brooklyn, New York	Transferred from Panola College
Deante Strickland	11	G	5'10"	175	Junior	Portland, Oregon	Transferred from Casper College
Jamie Orme	13	F	6'7"	200	Junior	Seattle, Washington	Transferred from Highline College
Derek Brown	25	G	6'0"	170	Junior	Federal Way, Washington	Transferred from Everett Community College
Vonte Carter	30	G	6'2"	170	Junior	Portland, Oregon	Transferred from Eastern Arizona College
Ryan Edwards	44	C	7'1"	290	RS Senior	Kalispell, Montana	Graduate Transfer from Gonzaga. Will play immediately in the 2017–18 season under NCAA transfer rules.

=== 2017 recruiting class ===
College recruiting information
Name	Hometown	School	Height	Weight	Commit date
Holland Woods #87 PG	Glendale, Arizona	Apollo High School	6 ft 0 in (1.83 m)	170 lb (77 kg)	Oct 11, 2016
Holland Woods #87 PG	Recruit ratings: Scout: Rivals: (63)				
Overall recruit ranking:
Note: In many cases, Scout, Rivals, 247Sports, On3, and ESPN may conflict in their listings of height and weight.; In these cases, the average was taken. ESPN grades are on a 100-point scale.; Sources: "2017 Team Ranking". Rivals.

== Roster ==
2017–18 Portland State Vikings men's basketball team
Players
Coaches

Pos.	#	Name	Height	Weight	Year	Previous school	Hometown
G	0	Bryce Canda	6 ft 4 in (1.93 m)	200 lb (91 kg)	Sr	Grant HS; Central Wyoming JC	Portland, Oregon
F	1	Brandon Hollins	6 ft 6 in (1.98 m)	200 lb (91 kg)	Sr	Jennings HS; Paris JC	St. Louis, Missouri
G	2	Michael Mayhew	6 ft 2 in (1.88 m)	195 lb (88 kg)	Jr	Marcus HS; Hill College	Flower Mound, Texas
G	3	Deontae North	6 ft 4 in (1.93 m)	190 lb (86 kg)	Sr	Centennial HS; Long Beach State	Corona, California
F	4	Brendan Rumel	6 ft 10 in (2.08 m)	235 lb (107 kg)	So	Rincon HS	Tucson, Arizona
C	5	Traylin Farris	6 ft 8 in (2.03 m)	225 lb (102 kg)	Sr	Manvel HS; Incarnate Word	Pearland, Texas
G	10	Devyn Wilson	6 ft 3 in (1.91 m)	175 lb (79 kg)	Jr	South Shore HS; Panola CC	Brooklyn, New York
G	11	Deante Strickland	5 ft 10 in (1.78 m)	175 lb (79 kg)	Jr	Central Catholic HS; Casper CC	Portland, Oregon
F	13	Jamie Malonzo	6 ft 7 in (2.01 m)	200 lb (91 kg)	Jr	O'Dea HS; Highline CC	Seattle, Washington
F	15	Braxton Tucker	6 ft 6 in (1.98 m)	220 lb (100 kg)	RS Sr	Spanaway Lake HS; North Idaho JC	Tacoma, Washington
G	23	Holland Woods	6 ft 0 in (1.83 m)	170 lb (77 kg)	Fr	Apollo HS	Glendale, Arizona
G	25	Derek Brown (W)	6 ft 0 in (1.83 m)	170 lb (77 kg)	Jr	Auburn Riverside HS; Everett CC	Federal Way, Washington
G	30	Vonte Carter (W)	6 ft 2 in (1.88 m)	170 lb (77 kg)	Jr	Benson Tech HS	Portland, Oregon
C	44	Ryan Edwards	7 ft 1 in (2.16 m)	290 lb (132 kg)	RS Sr	Glacier HS; Gonzaga	Kalispell, Montana
G		Tyrell Henderson (redshirt)	6 ft 3 in (1.91 m)	180 lb (82 kg)	So	Corona del Sol HS	Tempe, Arizona

Head coach

- Barret Peery (Southern Utah)

Assistant coach(es)

- Jase Coburn (Arizona State)
- Chris Skinkis (UW–Parkside)
- Kahil Fennell (Redlands)

Legend

- (C) Team captain
- (S) Suspended
- (I) Ineligible
- (W) Walk-on
- Injured
- Current redshirt

Roster
Last update: November 16, 2017

== Schedule and results ==
Date time, TV	Rank^{#}	Opponent^{#}	Result	Record	Site (attendance) city, state
Exhibition
Nov 6, 2017*; 1:00 pm		Evergreen State	W 122–67		Pamplin Sports Center (300); Portland, OR
Non-conference regular season
Nov 11, 2017*; 7:00 pm, NBCSNW		at Portland	W 80–75	1–0	Chiles Center (3,019); Portland, OR
Nov 14, 2017*; 8:00 pm		Willamette	W 111–60	2–0	Pamplin Sports Center (325); Portland, OR
Nov 18, 2017*; 4:00 pm		at UC Riverside	W 94–82	3–0	Student Recreation Center Arena; Riverside, CA
Nov 20, 2017*; 7:00 pm		Utah State; PK-80 opening round	W 83–79	4–0	Veterans Memorial Coliseum (804); Portland, OR
Nov 23, 2017*; 1:30 pm, ESPN		vs. No. 1 Duke; PK-80 quarterfinals	L 81–99	4–1	Veterans Memorial Coliseum (6,955); Portland, OR
Nov 24, 2017*; 12:00 pm, ESPNU		vs. Butler; PK-80 consolation 2nd round	L 69–71	4–2	Moda Center (13,746); Portland, OR
Nov 26, 2017*; 6:30 pm, ESPNU		vs. Stanford; PK-80 7th place game	W 87–78	5–2	Veterans Memorial Coliseum (2,771); Portland, OR
Dec 2, 2017*; 1:00 pm		Portland Bible	W 125–50	6–2	Pamplin Sports Center (288); Portland, OR
Dec 9, 2017*; 7:00 pm		at Loyola Marymount	W 94–85	7–2	Gersten Pavilion (857); Los Angeles, CA
Dec 9, 2017*; 7:00 pm		at Santa Clara	W 87–84	8–2	Leavey Center (1,361); Santa Clara, CA
Dec 13, 2017*; 7:00 pm, P12N		at Oregon	L 84–95	8–3	Matthew Knight Arena (6,905); Eugene, OR
Dec 16, 2017*; 1:00 pm		Linfield	W 116–71	9–3	Pamplin Sports Center (402); Portland, OR
Dec 21, 2017*; 8:00 pm, P12N		at California	W 106–81	10–3	Haas Pavilion (6,589); Berkeley, CA
Big Sky regular season
Dec 30, 2017; 7:05 pm		at Sacramento State	L 75–80	10–4 (0–1)	Hornets Nest (574); Sacramento, CA
Jan 4, 2018; 6:05 pm		at Eastern Washington	L 74–81	10–5 (0–2)	Reese Court (1,375); Cheney, WA
Jan 6, 2018; 7:00 pm, ELVN		Idaho	W 73–72	11–5 (1–2)	Cowan Spectrum (1,012); Moscow, ID
Jan 11, 2018; 8:00 pm		Montana State	W 93–74	12–5 (2–2)	Pamplin Sports Center (787); Portland, OR
Jan 13, 2018; 1:00 pm		Montana	L 89–92	12–6 (2–3)	Pamplin Sports Center (925); Portland, OR
Jan 18, 2018; 2:00 pm		at Idaho State	W 87–83	13–6 (3–3)	Reed Gym (1,645); Pocatello, ID
Jan 20, 2018; 6:00 pm		at Weber State	L 79–84	13–7 (3–4)	Dee Events Center (6,911); Ogden, UT
Jan 27, 2018; 1:00 pm		Sacramento State	L 61–71	13–8 (3–5)	Pamplin Sports Center (605); Portland, OR
Feb 1, 2018; 8:00 pm		Idaho	L 88–97	13–9 (3–6)	Pamplin Sports Center (710); Portland, OR
Feb 3, 2018; 1:00 pm		Eastern Washington	W 94–81	14–9 (4–6)	Pamplin Sports Center (527); Portland, OR
Feb 8, 2018; 6:00 pm		at Montana	L 60–80	14–10 (4–7)	Dahlberg Arena (4,082); Missoula, MT
Feb 10, 2018; 1:00 pm		at Montana State	W 80–77	15–10 (5–7)	Brick Breeden Fieldhouse (2,915); Bozeman, MT
Feb 15, 2018; 8:00 pm		Weber State	L 86–95 ^{OT}	15–11 (5–8)	Pamplin Sports Center (540); Portland, OR
Feb 17, 2018; 1:00 pm		Idaho State	W 91–77	16–11 (6–8)	Pamplin Sports Center (613); Portland, OR
Feb 22, 2018; 5:30 pm		at Southern Utah	W 96–91 ^{OT}	17–11 (7–8)	America First Events Center (3,245); Cedar City, UT
Feb 24, 2018; 5:30 pm, FSAZ		at Northern Arizona	W 72–66	18–11 (8–8)	Walkup Skydome (831); Flagstaff, AZ
Mar 1, 2018; 8:00 pm		Northern Colorado	L 78–85	18–12 (8–9)	Pamplin Sports Center (644); Portland, OR
Mar 3, 2018; 1:00 pm		North Dakota	W 97–90 ^{OT}	19–12 (9–9)	Pamplin Sports Center (715); Portland, OR
Big Sky tournament
Mar 6, 2018; 8:00 pm, Pluto TV	(6)	vs. (11) Sacramento State; First round	W 71–67	20–12	Reno Events Center (977); Reno, NV
Mar 8, 2018; 8:00 pm, ELVN	(6)	vs. (3) Eastern Washington; Quarterfinals	L 72–78	20–13	Reno Events Center (1,078); Reno, NV
CIT
Mar 17, 2018*; 7:00 pm		at San Diego; Second round	L 64–67	20–14	Jenny Craig Pavilion (1,019); San Diego, CA
*Non-conference game. ^{#}Rankings from AP Poll. (#) Tournament seedings in parentheses. All times are in Pacific Time..

== See also ==
- 2017–18 Portland State Vikings women's basketball team
