= 2017–18 Northern Colorado Bears men's basketball team =

American college basketball season

2017–18 Northern Colorado Bears men's basketball
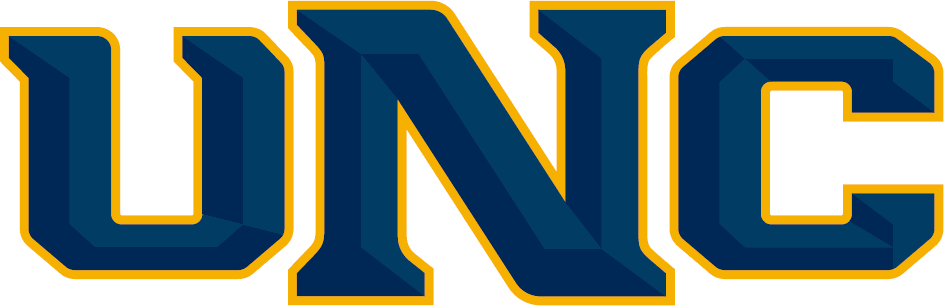

CIT Champions
- Conference: Big Sky Conference
- Record: 26–12 (11–7 Big Sky)
- Head coach: Jeff Linder (2nd season)
- Assistant coaches: Steve Smiley; Ken DeWeese; Vinnie McGhee
- Home arena: Bank of Colorado Arena

2017–18 Big Sky men's basketball standings
	Conf.				Overall
Team	W		L	PCT	W		L	PCT
Montana †	16	–	2	.889	26	–	8	.765
Idaho	14	–	4	.778	22	–	9	.710
Weber State	13	–	5	.722	20	–	11	.645
Eastern Washington	13	–	5	.722	20	–	15	.571
Northern Colorado	11	–	7	.611	26	–	12	.684
Idaho State	9	–	9	.500	14	–	16	.467
Portland State	9	–	9	.500	20	–	14	.588
Montana State	6	–	12	.333	13	–	19	.406
North Dakota	6	–	12	.333	12	–	20	.375
Southern Utah	5	–	13	.278	13	–	19	.406
Sacramento State	4	–	14	.222	7	–	25	.219
Northern Arizona	2	–	16	.111	5	–	27	.156
† Conference tournament winner

The 2017–18 Northern Colorado Bears men's basketball team represented the University of Northern Colorado during the 2017–18 NCAA Division I men's basketball season. The Bears were led by second-year head coach Jeff Linder and played their home games at Bank of Colorado Arena in Greeley, Colorado as members of the Big Sky Conference. They finished the season 26–12, 11–7 in Big Sky play to finish in fifth place. They defeated Northern Arizona and Weber State to advance to the semifinals of the Big Sky tournament to Montana. They were invited to the CollegeInsider.com Tournament where they defeated Drake, San Diego, Sam Houston State and UIC to become CIT champions.

== Previous season ==
The Bears finished the 2016–17 season 11–18, 7–11 in Big Sky play to finish in a tie for eighth place. On October 8, 2016, the school self-imposed a postseason ban amid an ongoing NCAA investigation.

== Departures ==
Name	Number	Pos.	Height	Weight	Year	Hometown	Notes
Gerad Davis	1	G	6'3"	195	Junior	Las Vegas, NV	Transferred to pursue football
Kyle Carey	2	G	6'6"	190	Freshman	London, England	Transferred to Barry
D. J. Miles	3	G	6'6"	195	Junior	Lakewood, CO	Graduate transferred to Fort Lewis
Mike Ranson	5	G	6'2"	185	Freshman	Pueblo, CO	Transferred to Fort Lewis
Jon'te Dotson	30	G	6'3"	185	Senior	Denver, CO	Walk-on; graduated
Jeremy Verhagen	33	F	6'10"	220	RS Junior	Florence, AZ	Graduate transferred to Nicholls State

== 2017 incoming recruits ==
College recruiting information
Name	Hometown	School	Height	Weight	Commit date
Matej Drgon; PF	Slovakia	Get Better Academy	6 ft 9 in (2.06 m)	N/A	
Matej Drgon; PF	Recruit ratings: Scout: Rivals: (NR)				
Johnatan Reyes; PG	San Antonio, TX	Clark High School	5 ft 10 in (1.78 m)	N/A	
Johnatan Reyes; PG	Recruit ratings: Scout: Rivals: (NR)				
Jalen Sanders; SF	Highlands Ranch, CO	Valor Christian High School	6 ft 5 in (1.96 m)	180 lb (82 kg)	
Jalen Sanders; SF	Recruit ratings: Scout: Rivals: (NR)				
Overall recruit ranking:
Note: In many cases, Scout, Rivals, 247Sports, On3, and ESPN may conflict in their listings of height and weight.; In these cases, the average was taken. ESPN grades are on a 100-point scale.; Sources: "2017 Team Ranking". Rivals.

== Roster ==
2017–18 Northern Colorado Bears men's basketball team
Players
Coaches

Pos.	#	Name	Height	Weight	Year	Previous school	Hometown
G	0	Jordan Davis	6 ft 2 in (1.88 m)	185 lb (84 kg)	Jr	Canyon Springs	Las Vegas, NV
G	2	Matt Johnson (W)	6 ft 2 in (1.88 m)	150 lb (68 kg)	Fr	Rangeview	Aurora, CO
G	4	Tyler Loose (W)	6 ft 0 in (1.83 m)	180 lb (82 kg)	RS Sr	Laramie; Casper College	Laramie, WY
F	10	Ibrahim Sylla	6 ft 8 in (2.03 m)	220 lb (100 kg)	RS Jr	South	Denver, CO
G	11	Andre Spight	6 ft 3 in (1.91 m)	170 lb (77 kg)	RS Sr	Burbank; Arizona State	Burbank, CA
G	12	Jonah Radebaugh	6 ft 2 in (1.88 m)	165 lb (75 kg)	RS So	Northglenn	Thornton, CO
G	13	Chaz Glotta	6 ft 2 in (1.88 m)	170 lb (77 kg)	RS Jr	Fort Zumwalt North; Southern Illinois	O'Fallon, MO
F	20	Tanner Morgan	6 ft 9 in (2.06 m)	230 lb (104 kg)	RS Sr	Sprague; Casper College	Salem, OR
F	21	Roberto Vercellino	6 ft 7 in (2.01 m)	210 lb (95 kg)	So	Liceo Scientifco A.B. Sabin	Turin, Italy
F	22	Jalen Sanders	6 ft 5 in (1.96 m)	180 lb (82 kg)	Fr	Valor Christian	Denver, CO
F	23	Matej Drgon	6 ft 9 in (2.06 m)	230 lb (104 kg)	Fr	GBA Academy	Hamuliakovo, Slovak Republic
G	24	Anthony Johnson	6 ft 2 in (1.88 m)	190 lb (86 kg)	RS Sr	Decatur Central	Indianapolis, IN
F	25	Kai Edwards	6 ft 9 in (2.06 m)	215 lb (98 kg)	So	Canarias Basketball Academy	Amsterdam, Netherlands
G	33	Johnatan Reyes	5 ft 11 in (1.8 m)	175 lb (79 kg)	Fr	Tom C. Clark	San Antonio, TX

Head coach

- Jeff Linder (Western Colorado)

Assistant coach(es)

- Steve Smiley (Northern State)
- Ken DeWeese (Mary Hardin–Baylor)
- Vinnie McGhee (Cal State Northridge)

Legend

- (C) Team captain
- (S) Suspended
- (I) Ineligible
- (W) Walk-on
- Injured
- Current redshirt

Roster

== Schedule and results ==
Date time, TV	Rank^{#}	Opponent^{#}	Result	Record	Site (attendance) city, state
Exhibition
Nov 2, 2017*; 7:00 pm		Johnson & Wales	W 106–51		Bank of Colorado Arena; Greeley, CO
Nov 5, 2017*; 5:00 pm		at Colorado State; Puerto Rico relief fund exhibition game	L 79–83		Moby Arena (1,079); Fort Collins, CO
Non-conference regular season
Nov 10, 2017*; 7:00 pm, P12N		at Colorado	L 51–66	0–1	Coors Events Center (7,740); Boulder, CO
Nov 13, 2017*; 7:00 pm		UC Davis	L 59–74	0–2	Bank of Colorado Arena (895); Greeley, CO
Nov 17, 2017*; 8:00 pm		at Pepperdine	W 84–82	1–2	Firestone Fieldhouse (805); Malibu, CA
Nov 21, 2017*; 7:00 pm		Northern New Mexico; Sanford Pentagon Showcase	W 99–60	2–2	Bank of Colorado Arena (857); Greeley, CO
Nov 24, 2017*; 7:00 pm		vs. Youngstown State; Sanford Pentagon Showcase	W 80–67	3–2	Sanford Pentagon (1,105); Sioux Falls, SD
Nov 25, 2017*; 5:30 pm		vs. South Dakota; Sanford Pentagon Showcase	W 63–62	4–2	Sanford Pentagon (1,248); Sioux Falls, SD
Nov 26, 2017*; 10:30 am		vs. Southern Miss; Sanford Pentagon Showcase	W 77–63	5–2	Sanford Pentagon (101); Sioux Falls, SD
Nov 29, 2017*; 8:00 pm		at UC Davis	L 51–56	5–3	The Pavilion (1,779); Davis, CA
Dec 3, 2017*; 5:00 pm		Western State	W 87–75	6–3	Bank of Colorado Arena (1,069); Greeley, CO
Dec 10, 2017*; 5:00 pm		Oklahoma Panhandle State	W 104–53	7–3	Bank of Colorado Arena (797); Greeley, CO
Dec 13, 2017*; 5:00 pm, CET		Denver	W 83–63	8–3	Bank of Colorado Arena (1,153); Greeley, CO
Dec 19, 2017*; 7:00 pm		at Wyoming	W 91–84	9–3	Arena-Auditorium (4,289); Laramie, WY
Dec 22, 2017*; 8:00 pm		at UNLV	L 91–94	9–4	Thomas & Mack Center (9,192); Paradise, NV
Big Sky regular season
Dec 29, 2017; 7:00 pm		Eastern Washington	W 88–75	10–4 (1–0)	Bank of Colorado Arena (1,047); Greeley, CO
Dec 31, 2017; 2:00 pm		Idaho	W 81–77	11–4 (2–0)	Bank of Colorado Arena (960); Greeley, CO
Jan 4, 2018; 7:00 pm		at Montana State	L 64–76	11–5 (2–1)	Brick Breeden Fieldhouse (2,542); Bozeman, MT
Jan 6, 2018; 7:00 pm		at Montana	L 80–89	11–6 (2–2)	Dahlberg Arena (4,119); Missoula, MT
Jan 11, 2018; 7:00 pm, CET		Weber State	L 74–78	11–7 (2–3)	Bank of Colorado Arena (1,792); Greeley, CO
Jan 13, 2018; 2:00 pm		Idaho State	W 94–80	12–7 (3–3)	Bank of Colorado Arena (1,165); Greeley, CO
Jan 20, 2018; 7:00 pm, ELVN		North Dakota	W 94–91 ^{OT}	13–7 (4–3)	Bank of Colorado Arena (2,059); Greeley, CO
Jan 25, 2018; 8:00 pm		at Idaho	W 80–63	14–7 (5–3)	Cowan Spectrum (1,122); Moscow, ID
Jan 27, 2018; 3:00 pm		at Eastern Washington	L 65–67	14–8 (5–4)	Reese Court (1,674); Cheney, WA
Feb 1, 2018; 7:00 pm		Montana	L 79–88	14–9 (5–5)	Bank of Colorado Arena (1,413); Greeley, CO
Feb 3, 2018; 2:00 pm, CET		Montana State	W 86–63	15–9 (6–5)	Bank of Colorado Arena (1,617); Greeley, CO
Feb 8, 2018; 7:00 pm		at Idaho State	W 85–82	16–9 (7–5)	Holt Arena (1,336); Pocatello, ID
Feb 10, 2018; 7:00 pm		at Weber State	L 66–71 ^{OT}	16–10 (7–6)	Dee Events Center (6,909); Ogden, UT
Feb 15, 2018; 7:00 pm, CET		Northern Arizona	W 95–60	17–10 (8–6)	Bank of Colorado Arena (1,524); Greeley, CO
Feb 17, 2018; 7:00 pm, CET		Southern Utah	W 97–80	18–10 (9–6)	Bank of Colorado Arena (1,683); Greeley, CO
Feb 24, 2018; 2:00 pm		at North Dakota	W 79–66	19–10 (10–6)	Betty Engelstad Sioux Center (1,895); Grand Forks, ND
Mar 1, 2018; 9:00 pm		at Portland State	W 85–78	20–10 (11–6)	Pamplin Sports Center (644); Portland, OR
Mar 3, 2018; 8:05 pm		at Sacramento State	L 77–88	20–11 (11–7)	Hornets Nest (686); Sacramento, CA
Big Sky tournament
Mar 6, 2018; 2:30 pm, Pluto TV	(5)	vs. (12) Northern Arizona; First round	W 82–59	21–11	Reno Events Center (986); Reno, NV
Mar 8, 2018; 2:30 pm, ELVN	(5)	vs. (4) Weber State; Quarterfinals	W 80–55	22–11	Reno Events Center (1,110); Reno, NV
Mar 9, 2018; 5:30 pm, ELVN	(5)	vs. (1) Montana; Semifinals	L 89–91	22–12	Reno Events Center (1,236); Reno, NV
CIT
Mar 18, 2018*; 3:00 pm		Drake; Second round	W 81–72	23–12	Bank of Colorado Arena (1,074); Greeley, CO
Mar 21, 2018*; 8:00 pm		at San Diego; Quarterfinals	W 86–75	24–12	Jenny Craig Pavilion (1,053); San Diego, CA
Mar 28, 2018*; 7:00 pm, CBSSN		Sam Houston State; Semifinals	W 99–80	25–12	Bank of Colorado Arena (2,019); Greeley, CO
Mar 30, 2018*; 5:00 pm, CBSSN		UIC; Championship	W 76–71	26–12	Bank of Colorado Arena (3,198); Greeley, CO
*Non-conference game. ^{#}Rankings from AP Poll. (#) Tournament seedings in parentheses. All times are in Mountain Time.
