= 2018–19 Northern Arizona Lumberjacks men's basketball team =

American college basketball season

2018–19 Northern Arizona Lumberjacks men's basketball
- Conference: Big Sky Conference
- Record: 10–21 (8–12 Big Sky)
- Head coach: Jack Murphy (7th season)
- Assistant coaches: Wes Pifer; Shane Burcar; Jason Sanchez
- Home arena: Walkup Skydome

2018–19 Big Sky men's basketball standings
	Conf.				Overall
Team	W		L	PCT	W		L	PCT
Montana †	16	–	4	.800	26	–	9	.743
Northern Colorado	15	–	5	.750	21	–	11	.656
Eastern Washington	12	–	8	.600	16	–	18	.471
Weber State	11	–	9	.550	18	–	15	.545
Portland State	11	–	9	.550	16	–	16	.500
Montana State	11	–	9	.550	15	–	17	.469
Southern Utah	9	–	11	.450	17	–	17	.500
Northern Arizona	8	–	12	.400	10	–	21	.323
Sacramento State	8	–	12	.400	15	–	16	.484
Idaho State	7	–	13	.350	11	–	19	.367
Idaho	2	–	18	.100	5	–	27	.156
† Conference tournament winner

The 2018–19 Northern Arizona Lumberjacks men's basketball team represented Northern Arizona University during the 2018–19 NCAA Division I men's basketball season. The Lumberjacks were led by seventh-year head coach Jack Murphy and played their home games at the Walkup Skydome in Flagstaff, Arizona as members of the Big Sky Conference. They finished the season 10–21, 8–12 in Big Sky play to finish in a tie for eighth place. They lost in the first round of the Big Sky tournament to Sacramento State.

On June 2, 2019, head coach Jack Murphy resigned to become the associate head coach at Arizona. He finished at Northern Arizona with a seven-year record of 78–149.

== Previous season ==
The Lumberjacks finished the 2017–18 season 5–27, 2–16 in Big Sky play to finish in last place. They lost in the first round of the Big Sky tournament to Northern Colorado.

== Offseason ==
=== Departures ===
Name	Number	Pos.	Height	Weight	Year	Hometown	Reason for departure
Torry Johnson	0	G	6'3"	165	RS Junior	Chicago, IL	Graduate transferred to Wake Forest
Gino Littles	3	G	6'1"	165	RS Senior	Phoenix, AZ	Graduated
JoJo Anderson	4	G	6'3"	170	Sophomore	Houston, TX	Transferred to Nevada
Malcolm Allen	10	G	6'3"	185	RS Senior	Las Vegas, NV	Graduated
Kye de Laveaga	12	G	6'1"	190	Senior	Scottsdale, AZ	Walk-on; graduated
Lenell Henry	23	F	6'8"	205	Freshman	Chicago, IL	Transferred to Panola College
Ruben Fuamba	55	F	6'9"	230	Senior	Congo	Graduated

=== Incoming transfers ===
Name	Number	Pos.	Height	Weight	Year	Hometown	Previous School
Cameron Satterwhite	0	G	6'4"	175	Junior	Gilbert, AZ	Transferred from Loyola–Chicago. Under NCAA transfer rules, Satterwhite will have to sit out for the 2018–19 season. Will have two years of remaining eligibility.
Davon Bolton	1	G	6'1"	175	Junior	Seattle, WA	Junior college transferred from Eastern Arizona College
Jonathan Andre	10	G/F	6'6"	210	RS Sophomore	North Miami Beach, FL	Junior college transferred from Wallace State CC

=== 2018 incoming recruits ===
College recruiting information
Name	Hometown	School	Height	Weight	Commit date
Cameron Shelton; PG	La Verne, CA	Damien High School	6 ft 2 in (1.88 m)	160 lb (73 kg)	Jul 24, 2017
Cameron Shelton; PG	Recruit ratings: Scout: Rivals: (NR)				
Keith Haymon; SG	Cypress, TX	Cypress Ranch High School	6 ft 6 in (1.98 m)	185 lb (84 kg)	Sep 25, 2017
Keith Haymon; SG	Recruit ratings: Scout: Rivals: (NR)				
Overall recruit ranking:
Note: In many cases, Scout, Rivals, 247Sports, On3, and ESPN may conflict in their listings of height and weight.; In these cases, the average was taken. ESPN grades are on a 100-point scale.; Sources: "2018 Team Ranking". Rivals.

== Roster ==
2018–19 Northern Arizona Lumberjacks men's basketball team
Players
Coaches

Pos.	#	Name	Height	Weight	Year	Previous school	Hometown
G	0	Cameron Satterwhite (redshirt)	6 ft 4 in (1.93 m)	175 lb (79 kg)	Jr	Loyola–Chicago	Gilbert, AZ
G	1	Davon Bolton	6 ft 2 in (1.88 m)	175 lb (79 kg)	Jr	Eastern Arizona College	Seattle, WA
F	2	Corey Brown	6 ft 8 in (2.03 m)	225 lb (102 kg)	Sr	McArthur HS	Hollywood, FL
G	4	Carlos Hines	6 ft 4 in (1.93 m)	171 lb (78 kg)	So	North Lawndale Prep HS	Chicago, IL
G	5	Omar Ndiaye (W)	6 ft 1 in (1.85 m)	165 lb (75 kg)	Sr	Monte de Sol HS	Santa Fe, NM
F	10	Jonathan Andre	6 ft 7 in (2.01 m)	205 lb (93 kg)	RS So	Wallace State CC	North Miami Beach, FL
F	13	Keith Haymon	6 ft 6 in (1.98 m)	170 lb (77 kg)	Fr	Cypress Ranch HS	Cypress, TX
G	14	Karl Harris	6 ft 5 in (1.96 m)	185 lb (84 kg)	Sr	Indian Hills CC	Chicago, IL
F	15	Nik Mains	6 ft 8 in (2.03 m)	195 lb (88 kg)	RS Fr	Pinnacle HS	Phoenix, AZ
G	20	Cameron Shelton	6 ft 2 in (1.88 m)	160 lb (73 kg)	Fr	Damien HS	La Verne, CA
G	21	Luke Avdalovic	6 ft 4 in (1.93 m)	185 lb (84 kg)	RS Fr	Vista del Lago HS	Folsom, CA
F	25	Brooks DeBisschop	6 ft 9 in (2.06 m)	230 lb (104 kg)	Jr	West Linn HS	West Linn, OR
G/F	32	Chris Bowling	6 ft 7 in (2.01 m)	175 lb (79 kg)	Jr	Gilbert HS	Gilbert, AZ
F	33	Isaiah Thomas	6 ft 9 in (2.06 m)	220 lb (100 kg)	Sr	Bishop O'Dowd HS	Oakland, CA
G/F	35	Aziz Seck	6 ft 7 in (2.01 m)	185 lb (84 kg)	RS So	Army & Navy Academy	Dakar, Senegal

Head coach

- Jack Murphy (Arizona)

Assistant coach(es)

- Wes Pifer (Penn State Altoona)
- Shane Burcar
- Jason Sanchez (Mobile)

Legend

- (C) Team captain
- (S) Suspended
- (I) Ineligible
- (W) Walk-on
- Injured
- Current redshirt

Roster

== Schedule and results ==
Date time, TV	Rank^{#}	Opponent^{#}	Result	Record	Site (attendance) city, state
Non-conference regular season
Nov 10, 2018*; 12:00 pm, Pluto TV		Jacksonville	W 97–82	1–0	Walkup Skydome (630); Flagstaff, AZ
Nov 12, 2018*; 6:00 pm, ESPN+		at South Dakota	L 74–90	1–1	Sanford Coyote Sports Center (1,692); Vermillion, SD
Nov 14, 2018*; 6:00 pm		at Omaha	W 76–66	2–1	Baxter Arena (1,468); Omaha, NE
Nov 18, 2018*; 8:00 pm		at Hawaii	L 68–85	2–2	Stan Sheriff Center (5,553); Honolulu, HI
Nov 29, 2018*; 8:00 pm		at UC Davis	L 57–73	2–3	The Pavilion (785); Davis, CA
Dec 1, 2018*; 5:00 pm		at Santa Clara	L 74–81	2–4	Leavey Center (1,817); Santa Clara, CA
Dec 8, 2018*; 6:00 pm		Utah Valley	L 78–98	2–5	Walkup Skydome (1,532); Flagstaff, AZ
Dec 15, 2018*; 8:00 pm		at San Jose State	L 74–79	2–6	Event Center Arena; San Jose, CA
Dec 19, 2018*; 8:00 pm		at San Francisco	L 60–76	2–7	War Memorial Gymnasium (1,297); San Francisco, CA
Dec 21, 2018*; 7:00 pm, P12N		at Utah	L 62–76	2–8	Jon M. Huntsman Center (11,239); Salt Lake City, UT
Big Sky regular season
Dec 29, 2018; 2:00 pm		Montana	L 73–86	2–9 (0–1)	Walkup Skydome (856); Flagstaff, AZ
Dec 31, 2018; 12:00 pm		Montana State	W 74–68	3–9 (1–1)	Walkup Skydome (472); Flagstaff, AZ
Jan 3, 2019; 7:00 pm		at Weber State	L 52–77	3–10 (1–2)	Dee Events Center (5,822); Ogden, UT
Jan 5, 2019; 7:00 pm		at Idaho State	W 81–69	4–10 (2–2)	Holt Arena; Pocatello, ID
Jan 12, 2019; 2:00 pm		at Southern Utah	L 82–84	4–11 (2–3)	America First Events Center (1,856); Cedar City, UT
Jan 17, 2019; 6:30 pm		Sacramento State	L 64–66	4–12 (2–4)	Walkup Skydome (1,706); Flagstaff, AZ
Jan 19, 2019; 2:00 pm		Portland State	W 82–75	5–12 (3–4)	Walkup Skydome (1,183); Flagstaff, AZ
Jan 26, 2019; 6:00 pm		Northern Colorado	L 48–63	5–13 (3–5)	Walkup Skydome (1,089); Flagstaff, AZ
Jan 28, 2019; 12:00 pm		Southern Utah	W 80–77 ^{OT}	6–13 (4–5)	Walkup Skydome (705); Flagstaff, AZ
Feb 2, 2019; 7:00 pm		at Idaho	W 86–73	7–13 (5–5)	Cowan Spectrum (1,089); Moscow, ID
Feb 4, 2019; 6:00 pm		at Eastern Washington	L 64–82	7–14 (5–6)	Reese Court (1,148); Cheney, WA
Feb 7, 2019; 6:30 pm		Idaho State	L 79–81	7–15 (5–7)	Walkup Skydome (734); Flagstaff, AZ
Feb 9, 2019; 2:00 pm		Weber State	L 71–86	7–16 (5–8)	Walkup Skydome (1,464); Flagstaff, AZ
Feb 14, 2019; 8:00 pm		at Portland State	L 94–103	7–17 (5–9)	Viking Pavilion (925); Portland, OR
Feb 16, 2019; 8:00 pm		at Sacramento State	W 78–66	8–17 (6–9)	Hornets Nest (706); Sacramento, CA
Feb 21, 2019; 6:30 pm		Idaho	W 75–54	9–17 (7–9)	Walkup Skydome (614); Flagstaff, AZ
Feb 23, 2019; 1:00 pm		Eastern Washington	L 73–86	9–18 (7–10)	Walkup Skydome (1,923); Flagstaff, AZ
Mar 2, 2019; 2:00 pm		at Montana State	L 73–84	9–19 (7–11)	Brick Breeden Fieldhouse (3,022); Bozeman, MT
Mar 4, 2019; 7:00 pm		at Montana	L 64–66	9–20 (7–12)	Dahlberg Arena; Missoula, MT
Mar 9, 2019; 7:00 pm		at Northern Colorado	W 89–78 ^{OT}	10–20 (8–12)	Bank of Colorado Arena; Greeley, CO
Big Sky tournament
Mar 13, 2019; 9:30 am, Pluto TV	(8)	vs. (9) Sacramento State; First round	L 60–72	10–21	CenturyLink Arena; Boise, ID
*Non-conference game. ^{#}Rankings from AP Poll. (#) Tournament seedings in parentheses. All times are in Mountain Time; Source.
