= 2018–19 Sacramento State Hornets men's basketball team =

American college basketball season

2018–19 Sacramento State Hornets men's basketball
- Conference: Big Sky Conference
- Record: 15–16 (8–12 Big Sky)
- Head coach: Brian Katz (11th season)
- Assistant coaches: Brandon Laird; Chris Walker; Nate Smith
- Home arena: The Nest (Capacity: 1,012)

2018–19 Big Sky men's basketball standings
	Conf.				Overall
Team	W		L	PCT	W		L	PCT
Montana †	16	–	4	.800	26	–	9	.743
Northern Colorado	15	–	5	.750	21	–	11	.656
Eastern Washington	12	–	8	.600	16	–	18	.471
Weber State	11	–	9	.550	18	–	15	.545
Portland State	11	–	9	.550	16	–	16	.500
Montana State	11	–	9	.550	15	–	17	.469
Southern Utah	9	–	11	.450	17	–	17	.500
Northern Arizona	8	–	12	.400	10	–	21	.323
Sacramento State	8	–	12	.400	15	–	16	.484
Idaho State	7	–	13	.350	11	–	19	.367
Idaho	2	–	18	.100	5	–	27	.156
† Conference tournament winner

The 2018–19 Sacramento State Hornets men's basketball team represented California State University, Sacramento in the 2018–19 NCAA Division I men's basketball season. The Hornets were led by eleventh-year head coach Brian Katz and competed at The Nest as a member of the Big Sky Conference for the 23rd consecutive season. They finished the season 15–16, 8–12 in Big Sky play to finish in a tie for eighth place. They defeated Northern Arizona in the first round of the Big Sky tournament before losing in the quarterfinals to Montana.

== Before the season ==
The Hornets finished 7–25 overall, and 4–14 in the conference. During the season, the Hornets participated in the Wooden Legacy, which was held in Fullerton, California. Sacramento State earned 8th place by losing to Cal State Fullerton, Saint Joseph's, and San Diego State. Sacramento State lost in both matches of the Sacramento Showcase against rival UC Davis and Portland. In the postseason, Sacramento State lost to Portland State in the first round of the 2018 Big Sky Conference men's basketball tournament in Reno, Nevada.

On July 19, 2018, the Sacramento State Hornets finished renovating The Nest's court. The renovation features include an emphasis on the main logo, implementing the school-known hashtag #StingersUp, and a redone of Sacramento State's colors.

== Offseason ==
=== Departures ===
Name	Number	Pos.	Height	Weight	Year	Hometown	Reason for departure
Justin Strings	3	F	6'7"	220	Senior	Carson, CA	Graduated
Jiday Ugbaja	4	G	5'11"	194	Senior	San Francisco, CA	Graduate transferred to San Francisco State
Cristian Perez	32	F	6'7"	215	Junior	Santa Fe Springs, CA	Left the team for personal reasons
James Herrick	50	C	6'10"	256	Senior	Minden, NV	Graduated

=== Incoming transfers ===
Name	Number	Pos.	Height	Weight	Year	Hometown	Previous School
Ethan Esposito	22	G/F	6'7"	220	Sophomore	Naples, Italy	Junior college transferred from San Diego City College
Brandon Davis	32	G	6'2"	190	Sophomore	Mission Hills, CA	Transferred from UC Santa Barbara. Under NCAA transfer rules, Davis will have to sit out from the 2018–19 season. Will have three years of remaining eligibility.

=== 2018 recruiting class ===
College recruiting information
Name	Hometown	School	Height	Weight	Commit date
Elijah McCullough #62 PG	La Verne, CA	Damien High School	6 ft 1 in (1.85 m)	155 lb (70 kg)	Sep 10, 2017
Elijah McCullough #62 PG	Recruit ratings: Scout: Rivals: (73)				
James Bridges; SG	Las Vegas, NV	Ed W. Clark High School	6 ft 4 in (1.93 m)	170 lb (77 kg)	Feb 26, 2018
James Bridges; SG	Recruit ratings: Scout: Rivals: (NR)				
Overall recruit ranking:
Note: In many cases, Scout, Rivals, 247Sports, On3, and ESPN may conflict in their listings of height and weight.; In these cases, the average was taken. ESPN grades are on a 100-point scale.; Sources: "2018 Team Ranking". Rivals.

== Season ==
Senior Marcus Graves was named to the All-Big Sky Second Team.

== Roster ==
2018–19 Sacramento State Hornets men's basketball team
Players
Coaches

Pos.	#	Name	Height	Weight	Year	Previous school	Hometown
G	0	Marcus Graves	6 ft 0 in (1.83 m)	188 lb (85 kg)	RS Sr	Westview High School	San Diego, California
F	1	Chibueze Jacobs	6 ft 4 in (1.93 m)	195 lb (88 kg)	Jr	Notre Dame High School	Santa Clarita, California
G	2	Izayah Mauriohooho-Le'afa	6 ft 2 in (1.88 m)	200 lb (91 kg)	Jr	Saint Patrick's College	Wellington, New Zealand
G	4	Jamion Wright (W)	5 ft 11 in (1.8 m)	160 lb (73 kg)	So	Mission High School	San Francisco, California
G	11	Kevin Hicks	5 ft 11 in (1.8 m)	168 lb (76 kg)	Sr	Western Texas College	New Orleans, Louisiana
G	12	Jordan Tolbert	5 ft 9 in (1.75 m)	150 lb (68 kg)	Sr	Western Texas College	Houston, Texas
G	13	Grant Greabell (W)	6 ft 3 in (1.91 m)	180 lb (82 kg)	Fr	Estrella Foothills High School	Goodyear, Arizona
G	14	Jeff Wu	6 ft 2 in (1.88 m)	180 lb (82 kg)	Sr	Modesto Christian School	Taipei, Taiwan
G	15	Elijah McCullough	6 ft 3 in (1.91 m)	170 lb (77 kg)	Fr	Damien High School	Chino Hills, California
G/F	20	James Bridges	6 ft 5 in (1.96 m)	210 lb (95 kg)	Fr	Clark High School	Las Vegas, Nevada
G/F	21	Osi Nwachukwu	6 ft 5 in (1.96 m)	195 lb (88 kg)	Jr	Antelope Valley College	Oakland, California
F	22	Ethan Esposito	6 ft 7 in (2.01 m)	220 lb (100 kg)	So	San Diego City College	Naples, Italy
G/F	23	Bryce Fowler	6 ft 6 in (1.98 m)	195 lb (88 kg)	So	Agua Fria High School	Avondale, Arizona
C	25	Calvin Martin	6 ft 6 in (1.98 m)	235 lb (107 kg)	Sr	Citrus College	Ridgecrest, California
C	30	Joshua Patton	6 ft 8 in (2.03 m)	225 lb (102 kg)	RS Jr	Sierra College	Manteca, California
G	32	Brandon Davis (redshirt)	6 ft 2 in (1.88 m)	190 lb (86 kg)	So	UC Santa Barbara	Mission Hills, California

Head coach

- Brian Katz (Sacramento State)

Assistant coach(es)

- Brandon Laird (UC Davis)
- Chris Walker (Oklahoma)
- Nate Smith (Sacramento State)

Legend

- (C) Team captain
- (S) Suspended
- (I) Ineligible
- (W) Walk-on
- Injured
- Current redshirt

Roster
Last update: July 26, 2018

== Schedule ==
Date time, TV	Rank^{#}	Opponent^{#}	Result	Record	High points	High rebounds	High assists	Site (attendance) city, state
Exhibition
November 2, 2018*; 7:05 pm		Bethesda	W 103–55		15 – Esposito	6 – 3 Tied	10 – Graves	The Nest (528); Sacramento, CA
Non-conference regular season
November 9, 2018*; 7:05 pm		Simpson (CA)	W 75–52	1–0	20 – Esposito	10 – Graves	11 – Graves	The Nest (537); Sacramento, CA
November 16, 2018*; PPD, Big Sky Network		Cal Poly						The Nest; Sacramento, CA
November 20, 2018*; 7:05 pm		vs. UC Davis; Rivalry	W 58–55	2–0	11 – 3 Tied	7 – 2 Tied	8 – Graves	Golden 1 Center (1,545); Sacramento, CA
November 24, 2018*; 7:05 pm		Cal State Fullerton	W 87-82 ^{OT}	3–0	22 – Graves	12 – Graves	8 – Graves	The Nest; Sacramento, CA
November 29, 2018*; 7:00 pm		at UC Santa Barbara	L 58-75	3–1	15 – Patton	5 – Mauriohooho-Le'afa	3 – Tied	The Thunderdome (1,516); Santa Barbara, CA
December 1, 2018*; 7:05 pm		at Cal State Northridge	W 88–68	4–1	19 – Graves	12 – Esposito	5 – Graves	Matadome (812); Los Angeles, CA
December 8, 2018*; 7:05 pm		at Portland	L 67–76	4–2	22 – Patton	11 – Patton	4 – Tied	Chiles Center (1,789); Portland, OR
December 11, 2018*; 7:05 pm, Big Sky Network		Holy Names	W 81–56	5–2	19 – Patton	11 – Fowler	10 – Graves	The Nest (496); Sacramento, CA
December 13, 2018*; 7:05 pm, Big Sky Network		Westcliff	W 89–40	6–2	18 – Graves	11 – Jacobs	6 – Mauriohooho-Le'afa	The Nest (307); Sacramento, CA
December 21, 2018*; 7:05 pm, P12N		at Washington	L 41–57	6–3	12 – Tied	6 – Graves	2 – 3 tied	Alaska Airlines Arena (6,888); Seattle, WA
Big Sky regular season
December 29, 2018; 7:05 pm, Big Sky Network		Northern Colorado	L 65–70	6–4 (0–1)	15 – Patton	9 – Patton	6 – Graves	The Nest (581); Sacramento, CA
January 3, 2019; 7:05 pm		at Montana	L 56–87	6–5 (0–2)	10 – Graves	5 – Mauriohooho	2 – Graves	Dahlberg Arena (3,920); Missoula, MT
January 5, 2019; 1:05 pm		at Montana State	L 70–84	6–6 (0–3)	18 – Graves	7 – Fowler	5 – Graves	Breeden Fieldhouse (2,723); Bozeman, MT
January 12, 2019; 7:05 pm, Big Sky Network		Idaho State	L 70–72	6–7 (0–4)	27 – Graves	8 – Fowler	4 – Graves	The Nest (761); Sacramento, CA
January 17, 2019; 5:35 pm		at Northern Arizona	W 66–64	7–7 (1–4)	34 – Patton	11 – Patton	3 – Graves	Walkup Skydome (1,706); Flagstaff, AZ
January 19, 2019; 1:05 pm		at Southern Utah	L 71–76	7–8 (1–5)	24 – Graves	8 – Nwachukwu	5 – Graves	America First Center (1,672); Cedar City, UT
January 24, 2019; 7:05 pm, Big Sky Network		Idaho	W 69–48	8–8 (2–5)	14 – Graves	8 – Patton	10 – Graves	The Nest (634); Sacramento, CA
January 26, 2019; 7:05 pm, Big Sky Network		Eastern Washington	L 92–94 ^{OT}	8–9 (2–6)	29 – Graves	10 – Nwachukwu	9 – Graves	The Nest (708); Sacramento, CA
January 31, 2019; 6:05 pm		at Idaho State	W 74–58	9–9 (3–6)	18 – Graves	9 – Nwachukwu	6 – Graves	Holt Arena (1,525); Pocatello, ID
February 2, 2019; 6:05 pm		at Weber State	L 65–75	9–10 (3–7)	14 – Graves	6 – Bridges	4 – Graves	Dee Events Center (7,034); Ogden, UT
February 9, 2019; 6:05 pm		at Northern Colorado	L 59–65	9–11 (3–8)	14 – Graves	6 – Graves	3 – Graves	Bank of Colorado Arena (1,637); Greeley, CO
February 11, 2019; 7:35 pm, Big Sky Network		Portland State	W 78–67	10–11 (4–8)	16 – Esposito	7 – Patton	5 – Graves	The Nest (689); Sacramento, CA
February 14, 2019; 7:05 pm, Big Sky Network		Southern Utah	W 84–73	11–11 (5–8)	22 – Patton	13 – Patton	6 – Maruiohooho	The Nest (615); Sacramento, CA
November 16, 2019; 7:05 pm, Big Sky Network		Northern Arizona	L 66–78	11–12 (5–9)	18 – Graves	10 – Patton	4 – Patton	The Nest (706); Sacramento, CA
February 21, 2019; 7:05 pm, Big Sky Network		Weber State	W 78–76	12–12 (6–9)	24 – Graves	12 – Patton	7 – Graves	The Nest (621); Sacramento, CA
February 23, 2019; 7:05 pm		at Portland State	L 57–65	12–13 (6–10)	12 – Patton	8 – Nwachukwu	6 – Graves	Pamplin Sports Center (1,115); Portland, OR
February 28, 2019; 6:05 pm		at Eastern Washington	W 59–56	13–13 (7–10)	19 – Graves	10 – Graves	9 – Graves	Reese Court (1,027); Cheney, WA
March 2, 2019; 7:05 pm		at Idaho	L 90-94	13-14 (7-11)	21 – Tolbert	5 – Patton	8 – Graves	Cowan Spectrum (1,219); Moscow, ID
March 7, 2019; 7:05 pm, Big Sky Network		Montana State	W 70–67	14–14 (8–11)	34 – Hall	8 – Kirby	7 – Frey	The Nest (709); Sacramento, CA
March 9, 2019; 7:05 pm, Big Sky Network		Montana	L 68–86	14–15 (8–12)	20 – Patton	6 – Patton	6 – Mauriohooho	The Nest (977); Sacramento, CA
Big Sky tournament
March 13, 2019; 8:30 am	(8)	vs. (9) Northern Arizona; First round	W 72–60	15–15	27 – Graves	4 – Graves	5 – Patton	CenturyLink Arena; Boise, ID
March 14, 2019; 11:00 am	(8)	vs. (1) Montana; Quarterfinals	L 73–79	15–16	30 – Graves	8 – Fowler	5 – Graves	CenturyLink Arena; Boise, ID
*Non-conference game. ^{#}Rankings from AP Poll. (#) Tournament seedings in parentheses. All times are in Pacific.
