= 2018–19 Montana State Bobcats men's basketball team =

American college basketball season

2018–19 Montana State Bobcats men's basketball
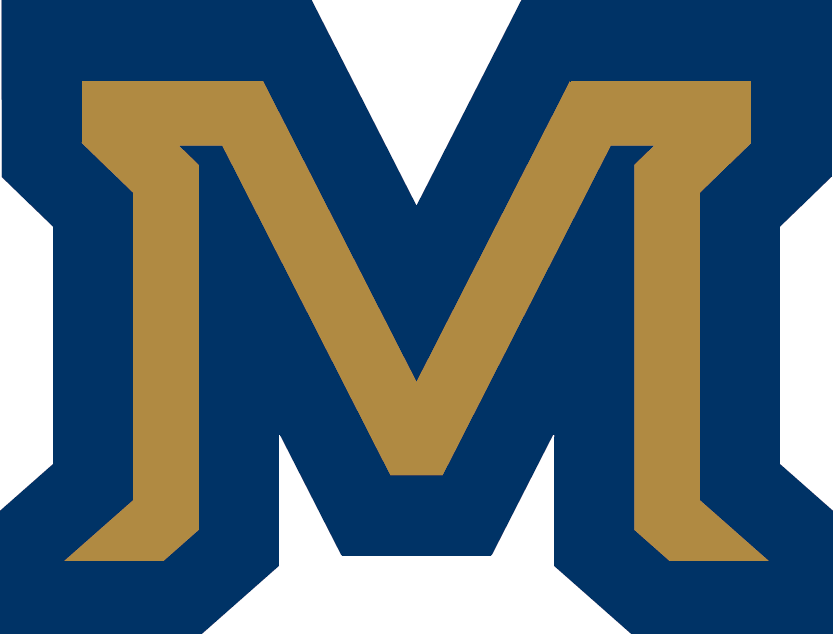
- Conference: Big Sky Conference
- Record: 15–17 (11–9 Big Sky)
- Head coach: Brian Fish (5th season)
- Assistant coaches: Chris Haslam; Luke Fennelly; Vinnie McGhee
- Home arena: Brick Breeden Fieldhouse

2018–19 Big Sky men's basketball standings
	Conf.				Overall
Team	W		L	PCT	W		L	PCT
Montana †	16	–	4	.800	26	–	9	.743
Northern Colorado	15	–	5	.750	21	–	11	.656
Eastern Washington	12	–	8	.600	16	–	18	.471
Weber State	11	–	9	.550	18	–	15	.545
Portland State	11	–	9	.550	16	–	16	.500
Montana State	11	–	9	.550	15	–	17	.469
Southern Utah	9	–	11	.450	17	–	17	.500
Northern Arizona	8	–	12	.400	10	–	21	.323
Sacramento State	8	–	12	.400	15	–	16	.484
Idaho State	7	–	13	.350	11	–	19	.367
Idaho	2	–	18	.100	5	–	27	.156
† Conference tournament winner

The 2018–19 Montana State Bobcats men's basketball team represented Montana State University during the 2018–19 NCAA Division I men's basketball season. The Bobcats, led by fifth-year head coach Brian Fish, played their home games at Brick Breeden Fieldhouse in Bozeman, Montana as members of the Big Sky Conference. They finished the season 15–17, 11–9 in Big Sky play to finish in a three-way tie for fourth place. They defeated Idaho in the first round of the Big Sky tournament before losing in the quarterfinals to Eastern Washington.

On March 17, head coach Brian Fish was fired. He finished at Montana State with a five-year record of 65–92.

== Previous season ==
The Bobcats finished the 2017–18 season finished the season 13–19, 6–12 in Big Sky play to finish in a tie for eighth place. They lost in the first round of the Big Sky tournament to North Dakota.

== Offseason ==
=== Departures ===
Name	Number	Pos.	Height	Weight	Year	Hometown	Reason for departure
Zach Green	0	G	6'4"	195	Senior	Gilbert, AZ	Graduated
Joe Mvuezolo Jr.	1	F	6'6"	180	Senior	London, England	Graduated
Devonte Klines	10	G	6'2"	185	Junior	Rancho Santa Margarita, CA	Declare for 2018 NBA draft
Isaac Bonton	13	G	6'2"	175	Freshman	Portland, OR	Transferred to Casper College
Benson Osayande	21	F	6'9"	200	Senior	Elk Grove, CA	Graduated
Konner Frey	22	G	6'6"	200	RS Senior	Bountiful, UT	Graduated
Luke Schultz	44	C	6'11"	230	Freshman	Fredericksburg, TX	Transferred to Christendom College

=== Incoming transfers ===
Name	Number	Pos.	Height	Weight	Year	Hometown	Previous School
Ladan Ricketts	11	F	6'5"	180	Junior	Livingston, MT	Junior college transferred from Sheridan College
Russell Daniels	20	G	5'11"	160	Junior	Baton Rouge, LA	Junior college transferred from Florida SouthWestern State College
Usman Haruna		F/C	6'11"	215	Senior	Kaduna, Nigeria	Transferred from East Carolina. Under NCAA transfer rules, Haruna will have to sit out from the 2018–19 season. Will have one year of remaining eligibility.

=== 2018 incoming recruits ===
College recruiting information
Name	Hometown	School	Height	Weight	Commit date
Jared Martin #75 SF	Scottsdale, AZ	Prolific Prep	6 ft 5 in (1.96 m)	185 lb (84 kg)	Sep 10, 2017
Jared Martin #75 SF	Recruit ratings: Scout: Rivals: (65)				
Zeke Quinlan; SF	Portland, OR	Hillcrest Preparatory Academy	6 ft 7 in (2.01 m)	205 lb (93 kg)	Aug 2, 2017
Zeke Quinlan; SF	Recruit ratings: Scout: Rivals: (0)				
Quentin Guliford; SF	Peoria, AZ	Liberty High School	6 ft 6 in (1.98 m)	175 lb (79 kg)	Oct 28, 2017
Quentin Guliford; SF	Recruit ratings: Scout: Rivals: (0)				
Maximilian Schuecker; C	Mödling, Austria	Oberwart Gunners	6 ft 9 in (2.06 m)	230 lb (100 kg)	Jun 2, 2018
Maximilian Schuecker; C	Recruit ratings: Scout: Rivals: (0)				
Overall recruit ranking:
Note: In many cases, Scout, Rivals, 247Sports, On3, and ESPN may conflict in their listings of height and weight.; In these cases, the average was taken. ESPN grades are on a 100-point scale.; Sources: "2018 Team Ranking". Rivals.

=== 2019 incoming recruits ===
College recruiting information (2019)
Name	Hometown	School	Height	Weight	Commit date
Caleb Bellach; SF	Manhattan, MT	Manhattan Christian School	6 ft 5 in (1.96 m)	180 lb (82 kg)	Aug 9, 2018
Caleb Bellach; SF	Recruit ratings: Scout: Rivals: (NR)				
Jubrile Belo; C	London, England	Lamar Community College	6 ft 9 in (2.06 m)	N/A	
Jubrile Belo; C	Recruit ratings: Scout: Rivals: (NR)				
Overall recruit ranking:
Note: In many cases, Scout, Rivals, 247Sports, On3, and ESPN may conflict in their listings of height and weight.; In these cases, the average was taken. ESPN grades are on a 100-point scale.; Sources: "2019 Team Ranking". Rivals.

== Roster ==
2018–19 Montana State Bobcats men's basketball team
Players
Coaches

Pos.	#	Name	Height	Weight	Year	Previous school	Hometown
F	0	Zeke Quinlan	6 ft 7 in (2.01 m)	220 lb (100 kg)	Fr	Life Christian/Hillcrest Prep	Portland, Oregon
G	1	Jared Martin	6 ft 5 in (1.96 m)	195 lb (88 kg)	Fr	Saguaro	Scottsdale, Arizona
F	2	Keljin Blevins	6 ft 6 in (1.98 m)	200 lb (91 kg)	RS Sr	Bishop O'Connell; Southern Miss	Hot Springs, Arkansas
G	3	Tyler Hall	6 ft 4 in (1.93 m)	210 lb (95 kg)	Sr	Rock Island	Rock Island, Illinois
C	4	Sam Neumann	6 ft 7 in (2.01 m)	220 lb (100 kg)	Sr	Cretin-Derham Hall	Saint Paul, Minnesota
G	5	Harald Frey	6 ft 1 in (1.85 m)	180 lb (82 kg)	Jr	Wang Sports Academy	Oslo, Norway
F	11	Ladan Ricketts	6 ft 5 in (1.96 m)	185 lb (84 kg)	Jr	Park; Sheridan College	Livingston, Montana
F	12	Quentin Guilford	6 ft 6 in (1.98 m)	180 lb (82 kg)	Fr	Liberty	Peoria, Arizona
G	13	Lassi Nikkarinen	6 ft 2 in (1.88 m)	180 lb (82 kg)	So	Mäkelänrinne	Helsinki, Finland
G	20	Russell Daniels	5 ft 11 in (1.8 m)	165 lb (75 kg)	Jr	McKinley; Florida SouthWestern State College	Baton Rouge, Louisiana
F	31	Devin Kirby	6 ft 11 in (2.11 m)	215 lb (98 kg)	RS So	Basha	Chandler, Arizona
C	32	Maximilian Schuecker	6 ft 9 in (2.06 m)	230 lb (104 kg)	Fr	Redwell Gunners Oberwart	Mödling, Austria
C		Usman Haruna (redshirt)	6 ft 11 in (2.11 m)	235 lb (107 kg)	Sr	Potter's House Academy; East Carolina	Kaduna, Nigeria

Head coach

- Brian Fish (Marshall)

Assistant coach(es)

- Chris Haslam (Wyoming)
- Luke Fennelly (Montana State)
- Vinnie McGhee (Cal State Northridge)

Legend

- (C) Team captain
- (S) Suspended
- (I) Ineligible
- (W) Walk-on
- Injured
- Current redshirt

Roster

== Schedule and results ==
Date time, TV	Rank^{#}	Opponent^{#}	Result	Record	Site (attendance) city, state
Exhibition
Oct 30, 2018*; 8:00 pm		Montana Western	W 90–75		Brick Breeden Fieldhouse (1,818); Bozeman, MT
Non-conference regular season
Nov 6, 2018*; 7:00 pm, Pluto TV		Utah State	L 71–101	0–1	Brick Breeden Fieldhouse (2,354); Bozeman, MT
Nov 9, 2018*; 6:00 pm, BTN		at Indiana; Hardwood Showcase	L 55–104	0–2	Simon Skjodt Assembly Hall (17,222); Bloomington, IN
Nov 11, 2018*; 7:00 pm, Pluto TV		Presentation; Hardwood Showcase	W 83–68	1–2	Brick Breeden Fieldhouse (1,268); Bozeman, MT
Nov 14, 2018*; 7:00 pm, MWN		at Colorado State	L 77–81	1–3	Moby Arena (2,243); Fort Collins, CO
Nov 17, 2018*; 3:00 pm		at UC Santa Barbara	L 69–88	1–4	The Thunderdome (2,387); Santa Barbara, CA
Nov 21, 2018*; 6:00 pm, SECN+		at Arkansas; Hardwood Showcase	L 68–90	1–5	Bud Walton Arena (8,682); Fayetteville, AR
Nov 24, 2018*; 12:00 pm		at Omaha	L 65–89	1–6	Baxter Arena (1,434); Omaha, NE
Nov 27, 2018*; 7:00 pm, SWX Montana		North Dakota	W 81–76	2–6	Brick Breeden Fieldhouse (2,527); Bozeman, MT
Dec 9, 2018*; 5:00 pm, P12N		vs. Washington State; Kennewick Showcase	W 95–90	3–6	Toyota Center (1,807); Kennewick, WA
Dec 18, 2018*; 7:00 pm		at Denver	L 64–76	3–7	Magness Arena (879); Denver, CO
Big Sky regular season
Dec 29, 2018; 2:00 pm		at Southern Utah	W 92–62	4–7 (1–0)	America First Events Center (1,802); Cedar City, UT
Dec 31, 2018; 2:00 pm		at Northern Arizona	L 68–74	4–8 (1–1)	Walkup Skydome (472); Flagstaff, AZ
Jan 3, 2019; 7:00 pm		Portland State	W 98–88	5–8 (2–1)	Brick Breeden Fieldhouse (2,297); Bozeman, MT
Jan 5, 2019; 2:00 pm		Sacramento State	W 84–70	6–8 (3–1)	Brick Breeden Fieldhouse; Bozeman, MT
Jan 10, 2019; 8:00 pm		at Idaho	W 77–67	7–8 (4–1)	Cowan Spectrum (1,029); Moscow, ID
Jan 14, 2019; 7:00 pm		Northern Colorado	L 70–73	7–9 (4–2)	Brick Breeden Fieldhouse (2,706); Bozeman, MT
Jan 19, 2019; 3:00 pm		at Eastern Washington	L 81–85	7–10 (4–3)	Reese Court (1,500); Cheney, WA
Jan 24, 2019; 7:00 pm		Weber State	L 84–93	7–11 (4–4)	Brick Breeden Fieldhouse (2,535); Bozeman, MT
Jan 26, 2019; 2:00 pm		Idaho State	W 104–84	8–11 (5–4)	Brick Breeden Fieldhouse (3,140); Bozeman, MT
Feb 2, 2019; 7:00 pm		Montana	L 78–83	8–12 (5–5)	Brick Breeden Fieldhouse (6,013); Bozeman, MT
Feb 4, 2019; 7:00 pm		at Northern Colorado	W 69–66	9–12 (6–5)	Bank of Colorado Arena (1,409); Greeley, CO
Feb 7, 2019; 7:00 pm		Eastern Washington	W 74–66	10–12 (7–5)	Brick Breeden Fieldhouse (2,267); Bozeman, MT
Feb 9, 2019; 2:00 pm		Idaho	W 86–72	11–12 (8–5)	Brick Breeden Fieldhouse (3,004); Bozeman, MT
Feb 14, 2019; 7:00 pm		at Idaho State	W 84–76	12–12 (9–5)	Reed Gym (1,436); Pocatello, ID
Feb 16, 2019; 7:00 pm		at Weber State	L 82–94	12–13 (9–6)	Dee Events Center (7,508); Ogden, UT
Feb 23, 2019; 7:00 pm		at Montana	L 83–89	12–14 (9–7)	Dahlberg Arena (7,135); Missoula, MT
Mar 2, 2019; 2:00 pm		Northern Arizona	W 84–73	13–14 (10–7)	Brick Breeden Fieldhouse (3,022); Bozeman, MT
Mar 4, 2019; 7:00 pm		Southern Utah	W 90–83	14–14 (11–7)	Brick Breeden Fieldhouse; Bozeman, MT
Mar 7, 2019; 8:00 pm		at Sacramento State	L 67–70	14–15 (11–8)	Hornets Nest; Sacramento, CA
Mar 9, 2019; 8:00 pm		at Portland State	L 80–84	14–16 (11–9)	Viking Pavilion; Portland, OR
Big Sky tournament
Mar 13, 2019; 2:30 pm, Pluto TV	(6)	vs. (11) Idaho; First round	W 75–71	15–16	CenturyLink Arena; Boise, ID
Mar 14, 2019; 8:00 pm, Eleven	(6)	vs. (3) Eastern Washington; Quarterfinals	L 84–90	15–17	CenturyLink Arena; Boise, ID
*Non-conference game. ^{#}Rankings from AP Poll. (#) Tournament seedings in parentheses. All times are in Mountain Time.
