= 2018–19 Southern Utah Thunderbirds men's basketball team =

American college basketball season

2018–19 Southern Utah Thunderbirds men's basketball

CIT, second round
- Conference: Big Sky Conference
- Record: 17–17 (9–11 Big Sky)
- Head coach: Todd Simon (3rd season)
- Assistant coaches: John Wardenburg; Chris Pompey; Trent Angelucci
- Home arena: America First Events Center

2018–19 Big Sky men's basketball standings
	Conf.				Overall
Team	W		L	PCT	W		L	PCT
Montana †	16	–	4	.800	26	–	9	.743
Northern Colorado	15	–	5	.750	21	–	11	.656
Eastern Washington	12	–	8	.600	16	–	18	.471
Weber State	11	–	9	.550	18	–	15	.545
Portland State	11	–	9	.550	16	–	16	.500
Montana State	11	–	9	.550	15	–	17	.469
Southern Utah	9	–	11	.450	17	–	17	.500
Northern Arizona	8	–	12	.400	10	–	21	.323
Sacramento State	8	–	12	.400	15	–	16	.484
Idaho State	7	–	13	.350	11	–	19	.367
Idaho	2	–	18	.100	5	–	27	.156
† Conference tournament winner

The 2018–19 Southern Utah Thunderbirds basketball team represented Southern Utah University during the 2018–19 NCAA Division I men's basketball season. The Thunderbirds were led by third-year head coach Todd Simon and played their home games at the America First Events Center in Cedar City, Utah as members of the Big Sky Conference. They finished the season 17–17, 9–11 in Big Sky, play to finish in seventh place. They defeated Idaho State and Northern Colorado to advance to the semifinals of the Big Sky tournament where they lost to Eastern Washington. They were invited to the CollegeInsider.com Tournament where they defeated Drake in the first round before losing in the second round to Cal State Bakersfield.

== Previous season ==
The Thunderbirds finished the 2017–18 season 13–19, 5–13 in Big Sky play, to finish in tenth place. In the Big Sky tournament they defeated Idaho State and Idaho to advance to the semifinals where they lost to Eastern Washington.

== Offseason ==
=== Departures ===
Name	Number	Pos.	Height	Weight	Year	Hometown	Reason for departure
Jamil Jackson	1	G/F	6'6"	190	Sophomore	Minneapolis, MN	Transferred to IUPUI
Jordan Lyons	5	G/F	6'7"	200	Freshman	Brampton, ON	Transferred to Vincennes
Jadon Cohee	12	G	6'4"	205	RS Junior	Langley, BC	Graduate transferred to British Columbia
Taelin Webb	13	G	5'11"	195	RS Junior	Fresno, CA	Walk-on; left the team for personal reasons
James McGee	14	G	6'2"	200	RS Senior	San Clemente, CA	Graduated
Jamal Aytes	15	F	6'6"	240	RS Senior	San Diego, CA	Graduated
Christian Musoko	34	F/C	6'8"	245	Senior	Kinshasa, Congo	Graduated
Joel Swallow	44	F	6'9"	230	RS Sophomore	Howell, UT	Walk-on; did not return

=== Incoming transfers ===
Name	Number	Pos.	Height	Weight	Year	Hometown	Previous school
Jason Richardson	3	G	6'2"	210	RS Junior	Hawthorne, CA	Junior college transferred from Fullerton College
Jakolby Long	13	G	6'5"	207	Junior	Mustang, OK	Transferred from Iowa State. Under NCAA transfer rules, Long will have to sit out for the 2018–19 season. Will have two years of remaining eligibility.
Daouda Ndiaye	14	C	7'0"	215	Senior	Dakar, Senegal	Transferred from Illinois State. Under NCAA transfer rules, Ndiaye will have to sit out for the 2018–19 season. Will have one year of remaining eligibility.

=== 2018 recruiting class ===
College recruiting information
Name	Hometown	School	Height	Weight	Commit date
Harrison Butler #58 SF	Santa Ana, CA	Mater Dei High School	6 ft 4 in (1.93 m)	205 lb (93 kg)	Oct 30, 2017
Harrison Butler #58 SF	Recruit ratings: Scout: Rivals: 247Sports: (78)				
Josh Cornish; SG	Baltimore, MD	Dulaney High School	6 ft 2 in (1.88 m)	165 lb (75 kg)	Mar 27, 2017
Josh Cornish; SG	Recruit ratings: Scout: Rivals: (NR)				
Maizen Fausett; SG	Saratoga Springs, UT	Westlake High School	6 ft 6 in (1.98 m)	N/A	Sep 21, 2015
Maizen Fausett; SG	Recruit ratings: Scout: Rivals: (NR)				
Overall recruit ranking:
Note: In many cases, Scout, Rivals, 247Sports, On3, and ESPN may conflict in their listings of height and weight.; In these cases, the average was taken. ESPN grades are on a 100-point scale.; Sources: "2018 Team Ranking". Rivals.

== Roster ==
2018–19 Southern Utah Thunderbirds men's basketball team
Players
Coaches

Pos.	#	Name	Height	Weight	Year	Previous school	Hometown
G	0	Dato Aphkhazava	6 ft 0 in (1.83 m)	178 lb (81 kg)	Fr	None	Batumi, Georgia
G	1	Kenton Eskridge	6 ft 2 in (1.88 m)	195 lb (88 kg)	Fr	Mt. Zion Prep	Atlanta, GA
G	2	Brandon Better	6 ft 3 in (1.91 m)	185 lb (84 kg)	Sr	Crossland HS; Moberly Area CC	Suitland, MD
G	3	Jason Richardson	6 ft 2 in (1.88 m)	205 lb (93 kg)	RS Jr	Junípero Serra HS; Fullerton College	Gardena, CA
G	4	Dre Marin	6 ft 0 in (1.83 m)	170 lb (77 kg)	So	Apollo HS	Glendale, AZ
G	5	Dillon Glendenning (W)	5 ft 11 in (1.8 m)	150 lb (68 kg)	Fr	Findlay Prep	Dallas, TX
F	10	Jacob Calloway	6 ft 8 in (2.03 m)	215 lb (98 kg)	Jr	On Point Academy	Juneau, AK
F	12	Maizen Fausett	6 ft 6 in (1.98 m)	225 lb (102 kg)	Fr	Westlake HS	Saratoga Springs, UT
G	13	Jakolby Long (redshirt)	6 ft 5 in (1.96 m)	208 lb (94 kg)	Jr	Mustang HS; Iowa State	Mustang, OK
C	14	Daouda Ndiaye (redshirt)	7 ft 0 in (2.13 m)	215 lb (98 kg)	Sr	Windermere Prep; Illinois State	Dakar, Senegal
G	15	Harrison Butler	6 ft 5 in (1.96 m)	220 lb (100 kg)	Fr	Mater Dei HS	Santa Ana, CA
G	21	Josh Cornish	6 ft 2 in (1.88 m)	165 lb (75 kg)	Fr	Dulaney HS	Cockeysville, MD
F/C	22	Ivan Madunic	6 ft 11 in (2.11 m)	225 lb (102 kg)	Jr	None	Split, Croatia
G/F	23	Cameron Oluyitan	6 ft 7 in (2.01 m)	195 lb (88 kg)	RS Jr	Clements HS; Boise State	Houston, TX
F	25	Dwayne Morgan	6 ft 8 in (2.03 m)	225 lb (102 kg)	RS Sr	St. Frances Academy; UNLV	Baltimore, MD
G/F	30	Elijah Graves (W)	6 ft 5 in (1.96 m)	215 lb (98 kg)	Sr	Liberty HS	Las Vegas, NV
F	32	Andre Adams	6 ft 9 in (2.06 m)	230 lb (104 kg)	RS Jr	IMG Academy; Arizona State	Avondale, AZ
G	33	Matthew Johnson (W)	6 ft 4 in (1.93 m)	210 lb (95 kg)	Sr	Coronado HS	Las Vegas, NV

Head coach

- Todd Simon (UNLV)

Assistant coach(es)

- John Wardenburg (BYU)
- Chris Pompey (Pittsburgh)
- Trent Angelucci (South Carolina)

Legend

- (C) Team captain
- (S) Suspended
- (I) Ineligible
- (W) Walk-on
- Injured
- Current redshirt

Roster
Last update: August 5, 2024

== Schedule and results ==
Date time, TV	Rank^{#}	Opponent^{#}	Result	Record	Site (attendance) city, state
Exhibition
October 30, 2018*; 6:30 p.m.		Life Pacific	W 96–53		America First Events Center (2,356); Cedar City, UT
Non-conference regular season
November 6, 2018*; 6:30 p.m.		West Coast Baptist	W 109–63	1–0	America First Events Center (1,572); Cedar City, UT
November 10, 2018*; 7:00 p.m.		at San Jose State	W 66–59	2–0	Event Center Arena (371); San Jose, CA
November 18, 2018*; 2:00 p.m.		at Seattle	W 73–70	3–0	Redhawk Center (999); Seattle, WA
November 23, 2018*; 8:00 p.m., MWN		at UNLV	L 71–76	3–1	Thomas & Mack Center (7,567); Paradise, NV
November 29, 2018*; 6:30 p.m., Pluto TV		San Diego Christian	W 111–64	4–1	America First Events Center (2,363); Cedar City, UT
December 5, 2018*; 8:00 p.m.		at Long Beach State	L 71–82	4–2	Walter Pyramid (1,876); Long Beach, CA
December 8, 2018*; 2:30 p.m., ESPN3		at Central Michigan	L 86–95	4–3	McGuirk Arena (1,832); Mount Pleasant, MI
December 15, 2018*; 7:00 p.m., Pluto TV		Pepperdine	W 78–69 ^{OT}	5–3	America First Events Center (1,772); Cedar City, UT
December 21, 2018*; 9:00 p.m., P12N		at USC	L 49–91	5–4	Galen Center (3,125); Los Angeles, CA
Big Sky regular season
December 29, 2018; 2:00 p.m., Pluto TV		Montana State	L 62–92	5–5 (0–1)	America First Events Center (1,802); Cedar City, UT
December 31, 2018; 6:30 p.m., Pluto TV		Montana	L 76–89	5–6 (0–2)	America First Events Center (1,451); Cedar City, UT
January 3, 2019; 7:05 p.m.		at Idaho State	L 68–88	5–7 (0–3)	Holt Arena (1,461); Pocatello, ID
January 5, 2019; 7:00 p.m.		at Weber State; Old Oquirrh Bucket	W 90–82 ^{OT}	6–7 (1–3)	Dee Events Center (6,751); Ogden, UT
January 12, 2019; 2:00 p.m., Pluto TV		Northern Arizona	W 84–82	7–7 (2–3)	America First Events Center (1,856); Cedar City, UT
January 17, 2019; 6:00 p.m., Pluto TV		Portland State	W 83–69	8–7 (3–3)	America First Events Center (2,307); Cedar City, UT
January 19, 2019; 2:00 p.m., Pluto TV		Sacramento State	W 76–71	9–7 (4–3)	America First Events Center (1,672); Cedar City, UT
January 24, 2019; 7:00 p.m.		at Northern Colorado	L 68–79	9–8 (4–4)	Bank of Colorado Arena (1,368); Greeley, CO
January 28, 2019; 2:00 p.m.		at Northern Arizona	L 77–80 ^{OT}	9–9 (4–5)	Walkup Skydome (705); Flagstaff, AZ
February 2, 2019; 3:05 p.m.		at Eastern Washington	L 79–82	9–10 (4–6)	Reese Court (1,244); Cheney, WA
February 4, 2019; 8:00 p.m.		at Idaho	W 75–64	10–10 (5–6)	Cowan Spectrum (634); Moscow, ID
February 7, 2019; 6:30 p.m., Pluto TV		Weber State; Old Oquirrh Bucket	W 65–53	11–10 (6–6)	America First Events Center (3,069); Cedar City, UT
February 9, 2019; 2:00 p.m., Pluto TV		Idaho State	W 78–72	12–10 (7–6)	America First Events Center (1,871); Cedar City, UT
February 14, 2019; 8:05 p.m.		at Sacramento State	L 73–84	12–11 (7–7)	Hornets Nest (615); Sacramento, CA
February 16, 2019; 8:05 p.m.		at Portland State	L 69–78	12–12 (7–8)	Viking Pavilion (1,130); Portland, OR
February 21, 2019; 6:30 p.m., Pluto TV		Eastern Washington	W 76–62	13–12 (8–8)	America First Events Center (1,578); Cedar City, UT
February 23, 2019; 2:00 p.m., Pluto TV		Idaho	W 85–76	14–12 (9–8)	America First Events Center (1,604); Cedar City, UT
March 2, 2019; 7:00 p.m.		at Montana	L 54–70	14–13 (9–9)	Dahlberg Arena (4,383); Missoula, MT
March 4, 2019; 7:00 p.m.		at Montana State	L 83–90	14–14 (9–10)	Brick Breeden Fieldhouse; Bozeman, MT
March 7, 2019; 6:30 p.m., Pluto TV		Northern Colorado	L 53–70	14–15 (9–11)	America First Events Center (2,172); Cedar City, UT
Big Sky tournament
March 13, 2019; 1:00 p.m., Pluto TV	(7)	vs. (10) Idaho State; First round	W 94–80	15–15	CenturyLink Arena; Boise, ID
March 14, 2019; 6:30 p.m., Eleven	(7)	vs. (2) Northern Colorado; Quarterfinals	W 83–63	16–15	CenturyLink Arena; Boise, ID
March 15, 2019; 9:00 p.m., Eleven	(7)	vs. (3) Eastern Washington; Semifinals	W 77–61	16–16	CenturyLink Arena (2,900); Boise, ID
CollegeInsider.com Postseason Tournament
March 22, 2019*; 6:30 p.m., watchcit.com		Drake; First round	W 80–73 ^{OT}	17–16	America First Events Center (2,714); Cedar City, UT
March 25, 2019*; 6:30 p.m., watchcit.com		Cal State Bakersfield; Second round	L 67–70	17–17	America First Events Center (3,027); Cedar City, UT
*Non-conference game. ^{#}Rankings from AP poll. (#) Tournament seedings in parentheses. All times are in Mountain.
