= 2018–19 Idaho State Bengals men's basketball team =

American college basketball season

2018–19 Idaho State Bengals men's basketball
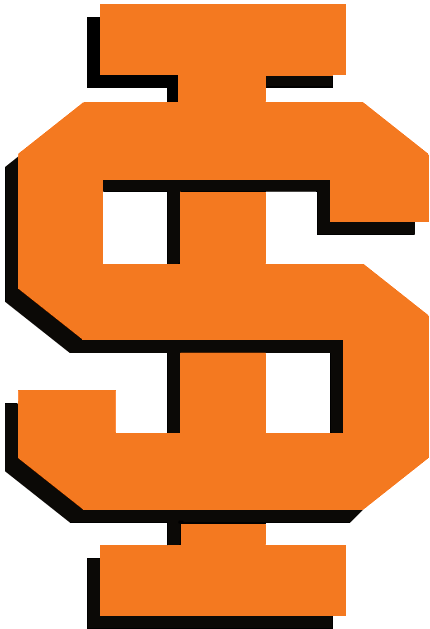
- Conference: Big Sky Conference
- Record: 11–19 (7–13 Big Sky)
- Head coach: Bill Evans (7th season)
- Assistant coaches: Tim Walsh; Kyle Taylor; C.J. Killin
- Home arena: Holt Arena; Reed Gym

2018–19 Big Sky men's basketball standings
	Conf.				Overall
Team	W		L	PCT	W		L	PCT
Montana †	16	–	4	.800	26	–	9	.743
Northern Colorado	15	–	5	.750	21	–	11	.656
Eastern Washington	12	–	8	.600	16	–	18	.471
Weber State	11	–	9	.550	18	–	15	.545
Portland State	11	–	9	.550	16	–	16	.500
Montana State	11	–	9	.550	15	–	17	.469
Southern Utah	9	–	11	.450	17	–	17	.500
Northern Arizona	8	–	12	.400	10	–	21	.323
Sacramento State	8	–	12	.400	15	–	16	.484
Idaho State	7	–	13	.350	11	–	19	.367
Idaho	2	–	18	.100	5	–	27	.156
† Conference tournament winner

The 2018–19 Idaho State Bengals men's basketball team represented Idaho State University during the 2018–19 NCAA Division I men's basketball season. The Bengals, led by seventh-year head coach Bill Evans, played their home games at Holt Arena and Reed Gym in Pocatello, Idaho as members of the Big Sky Conference. They finished the season 11–19, 7–13 in Big Sky play to finish in 11th place. They lost in the first round of the Big Sky tournament to Southern Utah.

On March 26, Idaho State decided to not renew the contract of head coach Bill Evans. He finished at Idaho State with a seven-year record of 70–141.

== Previous season ==
The Bengals finished the 2017–18 season 14–16, 9–9 in Big Sky play to finish in a tie for sixth place. They lost in the first round of the Big Sky tournament to Southern Utah.

== Offseason ==
=== Departures ===
Name	Number	Pos.	Height	Weight	Year	Hometown	Reason for departure
Hayes Garrity	0	G	6'2"	175	RS Senior	Beaverton, OR	Graduated
Geno Luzcando	1	G	6'3"	200	Senior	Estación Central, Chile	Graduated
Erik Nakken	11	G	6'3"	195	RS Senior	Cedar City, UT	Graduated
Novak Topalovic	13	C	7'0"	230	RS Junior	Niš, Serbia	Graduated transferred to Utah
Jacob McCord	22	F	6'7"	220	Junior	Kailua, HI	Transferred in January 2018 to Westminster
Kyle Ingram	35	F	6'8"	220	RS Senior	Pasadena, CA	Graduated
Callum Kimberley	44	F	6'8"	225	RS Freshman	Perth, Australia	Graduate transferred to Cal State Monterey Bay

=== Incoming transfers ===
Name	Number	Pos.	Height	Weight	Year	Hometown	Previous School
Chidi Udengwu	4	F	6'7"	185	Junior	Pomona, CA	Junior college transferred from San Bernardino Valley College
Chier Maker	5	F	6'7"		Junior	Sydney, Australia	Junior college transferred from Palm Beach State College
Alonzo Walker	22	F	6'6"	210	Junior	Toronto, ON	Junior college transferred from Odessa College
Kelvin Jones	54	C	6'11"	230	Junior	Hobbs, NM	Junior college transferred from Odessa College

=== 2018 recruiting class ===
College recruiting information
Name	Hometown	School	Height	Weight	Commit date
Austin Smellie; SG	Preston High School	Preston, ID	6 ft 4 in (1.93 m)	180 lb (82 kg)	Mar 25, 2016
Austin Smellie; SG	Recruit ratings: Scout: Rivals: (NR)				
Matija Ilić; PF	Wasatch Academy	Belgrade, Serbia	6 ft 7 in (2.01 m)	215 lb (98 kg)	Aug 24, 2018
Matija Ilić; PF	Recruit ratings: Scout: Rivals: (NR)				
Overall recruit ranking:
Note: In many cases, Scout, Rivals, 247Sports, On3, and ESPN may conflict in their listings of height and weight.; In these cases, the average was taken. ESPN grades are on a 100-point scale.; Sources: "2018 Team Ranking". Rivals.

=== 2019 recruiting class ===
College recruiting information (2019)
Name	Hometown	School	Height	Weight	Commit date
Antwan Kimmons; PG	Oakdale, MN	Tartan High School	6 ft 0 in (1.83 m)	185 lb (84 kg)	Jul 31, 2018
Antwan Kimmons; PG	Recruit ratings: Scout: Rivals: (NR)				
Overall recruit ranking:
Note: In many cases, Scout, Rivals, 247Sports, On3, and ESPN may conflict in their listings of height and weight.; In these cases, the average was taken. ESPN grades are on a 100-point scale.; Sources: "2019 Team Ranking". Rivals.

== Roster ==
2018–19 Idaho State Bengals men's basketball team
Players
Coaches

Pos.	#	Name	Height	Weight	Year	Previous school	Hometown
G	0	Andrew Vaughan (W)	5 ft 10 in (1.78 m)	165 lb (75 kg)	RS Fr	Marsh Valley HS	McCammon, ID
G	1	Austin Smellie	6 ft 5 in (1.96 m)	180 lb (82 kg)	Fr	Preston HS	Preston, ID
G	3	Sam Dowd	5 ft 7 in (1.7 m)	167 lb (76 kg)	Sr	Gonzaga Prep; North Idaho College	Seattle, WA
G	4	Chidi Udengwu	6 ft 7 in (2.01 m)	194 lb (88 kg)	Jr	Diamond Ranch HS; San Bernardino Valley College	Diamond Bar, CA
F	5	Chier Maker	6 ft 7 in (2.01 m)	200 lb (91 kg)	Jr	Newington College; Palm Beach State	Sydney, Australia
G	10	Lyle Sutton (W)	6 ft 2 in (1.88 m)	185 lb (84 kg)	RS So	Madison HS	Rexburg, ID
G	15	Brandon Boyd	5 ft 11 in (1.8 m)	180 lb (82 kg)	RS Jr	Middlebrooks Academy	Los Angeles, CA
G	20	Balint Moscan	6 ft 3 in (1.91 m)	182 lb (83 kg)	Jr	Kempelen Farkas Grammar School	Budapest, Hungary
G/F	21	Jared Stutzman	6 ft 6 in (1.98 m)	200 lb (91 kg)	Jr	Bonneville; Utah Valley	Idaho Falls, ID
F	22	Alonzo Walker	6 ft 6 in (1.98 m)	210 lb (95 kg)	Jr	Orangeville Prep; Odessa College	Toronto, ON
G	23	Houston Wahlen (W)	6 ft 2 in (1.88 m)	175 lb (79 kg)	RS So	Aberdeen HS	Aberdeen, ID
F/C	24	Blake Truman	6 ft 8 in (2.03 m)	230 lb (104 kg)	Sr	Legend HS; Snow College	Las Vegas, NV
G	25	Gary Chivichyan	6 ft 4 in (1.93 m)	200 lb (91 kg)	RS Jr	Middlebrooks Academy	Los Angeles, CA
F	32	Matija Ilic	6 ft 7 in (2.01 m)	215 lb (98 kg)	Fr	Wasatch Academy	Belgrade, Serbia
C	54	Kelvin Jones	6 ft 11 in (2.11 m)	230 lb (104 kg)	Jr	Hobbs HS; Odessa College	Chihuahua, Mexico

Head coach

- Bill Evans (Southern Utah)

Assistant coach(es)

- Tim Walsh (Western Illinois)
- Kyle Taylor (UCLA)
- C.J. Killin (Nebraska–Kearney)

Legend

- (C) Team captain
- (S) Suspended
- (I) Ineligible
- (W) Walk-on
- Injured
- Current redshirt

Roster

== Schedule and results ==
Date time, TV	Rank^{#}	Opponent^{#}	Result	Record	Site (attendance) city, state
Non-conference regular season
Nov 6, 2018*; 7:00 pm, RTNW		at No. 3 Gonzaga	L 79–120	0–1	McCarthey Athletic Center (6,000); Spokane, WA
Nov 10, 2018*; 7:00 pm		at Boise State	W 72–70	1–1	Taco Bell Arena (5,001); Boise, ID
Nov 15, 2018*; 7:00 pm, Pluto TV		Pacific	L 76–83	1–2	Reed Gym (1,297); Pocatello, ID
Nov 19, 2018*; 7:05 pm, Pluto TV		Bethesda	W 115–60	2–2	Reed Gym; Pocatello, ID
Nov 26, 2018*; 8:00 pm		at Pepperdine	L 82–97	2–3	Firestone Fieldhouse (625); Malibu, CA
Nov 29, 2018*; 7:05 pm		Montana–Western	W 74–66	3–3	Holt Arena (1,323); Pocatello, ID
Dec 7, 2018*; 8:00 pm		at Santa Clara	W 68–66	4–3	Leavey Center (1,124); Santa Clara, CA
Dec 19, 2018*; 7:00 pm		at Utah Valley	L 77–88	4–4	UCCU Center (1,994); Orem, UT
Dec 22, 2018*; 3:00 pm		at UC Santa Barbara	L 65–84	4–5	The Thunderdome (1,214); Santa Barbara, CA
Big Sky regular season
Dec 29, 2018; 8:00 pm		at Idaho	W 72–55	5–5 (1–0)	Cowan Spectrum (659); Moscow, ID
Dec 31, 2018; 2:00 pm		at Eastern Washington	L 55–65	5–6 (1–1)	Reese Court (1,011); Cheney, WA
Jan 3, 2019; 7:05 pm		Southern Utah	W 88–68	6–6 (2–1)	Holt Arena (1,461); Pocatello, ID
Jan 5, 2019; 7:05 pm		Northern Arizona	L 69–81	6–7 (2–2)	Holt Arena; Pocatello, ID
Jan 12, 2019; 8:00 pm		at Sacramento State	W 72–70	7–7 (3–2)	Hornets Nest (761); Sacramento, CA
Jan 17, 2019; 7:00 pm		at Weber State	L 59–76	7–8 (3–3)	Dee Events Center (6,024); Ogden, UT
Jan 21, 2019; 7:00 pm		Northern Colorado	L 53–77	7–9 (3–4)	Reed Gym (1,655); Pocatello, ID
Jan 24, 2019; 7:00 pm		at Montana	L 69–80	7–10 (3–5)	Dahlberg Arena (4,076); Missoula, MT
Jan 26, 2019; 2:00 pm		at Montana State	L 84–104	7–11 (3–6)	Brick Breeden Fieldhouse (3,140); Bozeman, MT
Jan 31, 2019; 7:05 pm		Sacramento State	L 58–74	7–12 (3–7)	Holt Arena (1,525); Pocatello, ID
Feb 2, 2019; 7:05 pm		Portland State	W 69–67	8–12 (4–7)	Holt Arena (1,610); Pocatello, ID
Feb 7, 2019; 6:30 pm		at Northern Arizona	W 81–79	9–12 (5–7)	Walkup Skydome (734); Flagstaff, AZ
Feb 9, 2019; 2:00 pm		at Southern Utah	L 72–78	9–13 (5–8)	America First Events Center (1,871); Cedar City, UT
Feb 14, 2019; 7:05 pm		Montana State	L 76–84	9–14 (5–9)	Reed Gym (1,436); Pocatello, ID
Feb 16, 2019; 7:05 pm		Montana	L 68–80	9–15 (5–10)	Reed Gym (1,503); Pocatello, ID
Feb 21, 2019; 8:00 pm		at Portland State	L 93–99	9–16 (5–11)	Viking Pavilion (842); Portland, OR
Mar 2, 2019; 7:00 pm		at Northern Colorado	L 62–71	9–17 (5–12)	Bank of Colorado Arena (2,024); Greeley, CO
Mar 4, 2019; 7:05 pm		Weber State	W 78–74	10–17 (6–12)	Holt Arena; Pocatello, ID
Mar 7, 2018; 7:05 pm		Eastern Washington	L 62–91	10–18 (6–13)	Holt Arena (1,484); Pocatello, ID
Mar 9, 2018; 7:05 pm		Idaho	W 70–68	11–18 (7–13)	Holt Arena (1,951); Pocatello, ID
Big Sky tournament
Mar 13, 2019; 12:00 pm, Pluto TV	(10)	vs. (7) Southern Utah; First round	L 80–94	11–19	CenturyLink Arena; Boise, ID
*Non-conference game. ^{#}Rankings from AP Poll. (#) Tournament seedings in parentheses. All times are in Mountain Time.
