= 2018–19 Northern Colorado Bears men's basketball team =

American college basketball season

2018–19 Northern Colorado Bears men's basketball
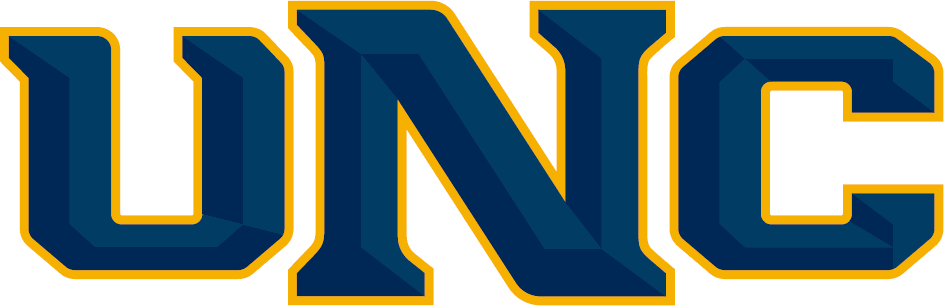
- Conference: Big Sky Conference
- Record: 21–11 (15–5 Big Sky)
- Head coach: Jeff Linder (3rd season)
- Assistant coaches: Steve Smiley; Ken DeWeese; Vinnie McGhee
- Home arena: Bank of Colorado Arena

2018–19 Big Sky men's basketball standings
	Conf.				Overall
Team	W		L	PCT	W		L	PCT
Montana †	16	–	4	.800	26	–	9	.743
Northern Colorado	15	–	5	.750	21	–	11	.656
Eastern Washington	12	–	8	.600	16	–	18	.471
Weber State	11	–	9	.550	18	–	15	.545
Portland State	11	–	9	.550	16	–	16	.500
Montana State	11	–	9	.550	15	–	17	.469
Southern Utah	9	–	11	.450	17	–	17	.500
Northern Arizona	8	–	12	.400	10	–	21	.323
Sacramento State	8	–	12	.400	15	–	16	.484
Idaho State	7	–	13	.350	11	–	19	.367
Idaho	2	–	18	.100	5	–	27	.156
† Conference tournament winner

The 2018–19 Northern Colorado Bears men's basketball team represented the University of Northern Colorado during the 2018–19 NCAA Division I men's basketball season. The Bears were led by third-year head coach Jeff Linder and played their home games at Bank of Colorado Arena in Greeley, Colorado as members of the Big Sky Conference. They finished the season 21–11, 15–5 in Big Sky play to finish in second place. They lost in the quarterfinals of the Big Sky tournament to Southern Utah.

== Previous season ==
The Bears finished the 2017–18 season 26–12, 11–7 in Big Sky play to finish in fifth place. They defeated Northern Arizona and Weber State to advance to the semifinals of the Big Sky tournament to Montana. They were invited to the CollegeInsider.com Tournament where they defeated Drake, San Diego, Sam Houston State and UIC to become CIT champions.

== Departures ==
Name	Number	Pos.	Height	Weight	Year	Hometown	Reason for departure
Tyler Loose	4	G	6'0"	180	RS Senior	Laramie, WY	Walk-on; graduated
Ibrahim Sylla	10	F	6'8"	220	RS Junior	Denver, CO	Graduate transferred to North Carolina A&T
Andre Spight	11	G	6'3"	170	RS Senior	Burbank, CA	Graduated
Chaz Glotta	13	G	6'2"	170	RS Junior	O'Fallon, MO	Graduate transferred to Maryville
Tanner Morgan	20	F	6'9"	230	RS Senior	Salem, OR	Graduated
Roberto Vercellino	21	F	6'7"	210	Sophomore	Turin, Italy	Transferred to Regis
Anthony Johnson	24	G	6'2"	190	RS Senior	Indianapolis, IN	Graduated

=== Incoming transfers ===
Name	Number	Pos.	Height	Weight	Year	Hometown	Previous School
Trent Harris	1	G	6'1"	155	Junior	Scottsbulff, NE	Junior college transferred from Western Nebraska CC

=== 2018 incoming recruits ===
College recruiting information
Name	Hometown	School	Height	Weight	Commit date
Sam Masten #59 PG	Littleton, CO	Rock Canyon High School	6 ft 1 in (1.85 m)	155 lb (70 kg)	May 4, 2017
Sam Masten #59 PG	Recruit ratings: Scout: Rivals: (75)				
Tre'Shon Smoots-Jones; PG	Sacramento, CA	Grant Union High School	6 ft 1 in (1.85 m)	170 lb (77 kg)	May 4, 2017
Tre'Shon Smoots-Jones; PG	Recruit ratings: Scout: Rivals: (NR)				
Bodie Hume; SF	Sterling, CO	Sterling High School	6 ft 6 in (1.98 m)	190 lb (86 kg)	Jul 17, 2017
Bodie Hume; SF	Recruit ratings: Scout: Rivals: (NR)				
Kur Jockuch; PF	Canada	London Basketball Academy	6 ft 8 in (2.03 m)	220 lb (100 kg)	Jul 2, 2018
Kur Jockuch; PF	Recruit ratings: Scout: Rivals: (NR)				
Cole Bergan; PF	Aberdeen, SD	Central High School	6 ft 7 in (2.01 m)	210 lb (95 kg)	Aug 22, 2017
Cole Bergan; PF	Recruit ratings: Scout: Rivals: (NR)				
Roy Grigsby; PF	Louisville, CO	New Hampton School	6 ft 7 in (2.01 m)	200 lb (91 kg)	May 31, 2018
Roy Grigsby; PF	Recruit ratings: Scout: Rivals: (NR)				
Overall recruit ranking:
Note: In many cases, Scout, Rivals, 247Sports, On3, and ESPN may conflict in their listings of height and weight.; In these cases, the average was taken. ESPN grades are on a 100-point scale.; Sources: "2018 Team Ranking". Rivals.

=== 2019 incoming recruits ===
College recruiting information (2019)
Name	Hometown	School	Height	Weight	Commit date
Cole Nicholson; SF	Chaska, MN	Chaska High School	6 ft 5 in (1.96 m)	N/A	Jul 28, 2018
Cole Nicholson; SF	Recruit ratings: Scout: Rivals: (NR)				
Overall recruit ranking:
Note: In many cases, Scout, Rivals, 247Sports, On3, and ESPN may conflict in their listings of height and weight.; In these cases, the average was taken. ESPN grades are on a 100-point scale.; Sources: "2019 Team Ranking". Rivals.

== Roster ==
2018–19 Northern Colorado Bears men's basketball team
Players
Coaches

Pos.	#	Name	Height	Weight	Year	Previous school	Hometown
G	0	Jordan Davis	6 ft 2 in (1.88 m)	185 lb (84 kg)	Sr	Canyon Springs	Las Vegas, NV
G	1	Trent Harris	6 ft 1 in (1.85 m)	160 lb (73 kg)	Jr	Scottsbluff; Western Nebraska CC	Scottsbluff, NE
G	2	Matt Johnson (W)	6 ft 2 in (1.88 m)	180 lb (82 kg)	RS Fr	Rangeview	Aurora, CO
G	3	Tre'Shon Smoots	6 ft 1 in (1.85 m)	175 lb (79 kg)	Fr	Grant Union	Sacramento, CA
F	4	Cole Bergan	6 ft 7 in (2.01 m)	220 lb (100 kg)	Fr	Aberdeen Central	Aberdeen, SD
G	5	Sam Masten	6 ft 2 in (1.88 m)	175 lb (79 kg)	Fr	Rock Canyon	Littleton, CO
G	12	Jonah Radebaugh	6 ft 2 in (1.88 m)	185 lb (84 kg)	RS Jr	Northglenn	Thornton, CO
G	13	Bodie Hume	6 ft 6 in (1.98 m)	190 lb (86 kg)	Fr	Sterling	Sterling, CO
F	15	Kur Jockuch	6 ft 9 in (2.06 m)	220 lb (100 kg)	Fr	London Basketball Academy	Ontario
F	22	Jalen Sanders	6 ft 5 in (1.96 m)	190 lb (86 kg)	So	Valor Christian	Denver, CO
F	23	Matej Drgon	6 ft 9 in (2.06 m)	230 lb (104 kg)	So	GBA Academy	Hamuliakovo, Slovak Republic
G	24	David Jabedo (W)	6 ft 4 in (1.93 m)	190 lb (86 kg)	Fr	Sand Creek	Colorado Springs, CO
F	25	Kai Edwards	6 ft 9 in (2.06 m)	225 lb (102 kg)	Jr	Canarias Basketball Academy	Amsterdam, Netherlands
G	33	Johnatan Reyes	5 ft 11 in (1.8 m)	175 lb (79 kg)	So	Tom C. Clark	San Antonio, TX
F	43	Roy Grigsby	6 ft 9 in (2.06 m)	200 lb (91 kg)	Fr	Monarch	Superior, CO

Head coach

- Jeff Linder (Western Colorado)

Assistant coach(es)

- Steve Smiley (Northern State)
- Ken DeWeese (Mary Hardin–Baylor)
- Vinnie McGhee (Cal State Northridge)

Legend

- (C) Team captain
- (S) Suspended
- (I) Ineligible
- (W) Walk-on
- Injured
- Current redshirt

Roster

== Schedule and results ==
Date time, TV	Rank^{#}	Opponent^{#}	Result	Record	Site (attendance) city, state
Exhibition
Oct 30, 2018*; 7:00 pm		Colorado Christian	W 92–59		Bank of Colorado Arena (1,773); Greeley, CO
Non-conference regular season
Nov 9, 2018*; 7:00 pm, Pluto TV		Colorado College	W 126–56	1–0	Bank of Colorado Arena (1,348); Greeley, CO
Nov 13, 2018*; 7:00 pm, Pluto TV		Pepperdine	W 88–80	2–0	Bank of Colorado Arena (1,778); Greeley, CO
Nov 21, 2018*; 6:00 pm		at Incarnate Word	W 90–64	3–0	McDermott Center (705); San Antonio, TX
Nov 24, 2018*; 3:30 pm		at Texas Tech	L 62–93	3–1	United Supermarkets Arena (9,689); Lubbock, TX
Nov 28, 2018*; 7:00 pm		at Denver	W 88–72	4–1	Magness Arena; Denver, CO
Dec 1, 2018*; 4:00 pm		at Wyoming	W 85–80	5–1	Arena-Auditorium (4,046); Laramie, WY
Dec 11, 2018*; 7:00 pm, Pluto TV		Johnson & Wales (CO)	W 118–52	6–1	Bank of Colorado Arena (1,255); Greeley, CO
Dec 15, 2018*; 8:00 pm		at San Diego; Las Vegas Classic	L 65–85	6–2	Jenny Craig Pavilion (1,497); San Diego, CA
Dec 17, 2018*; 7:00 pm		at New Mexico State; Las Vegas Classic	L 62–74	6–3	Pan American Center (4,304); Las Cruces, NM
Dec 22, 2018*; 2:30 pm		vs. Rider; Las Vegas Classic Visitors semifinals	L 67–74	6–4	Orleans Arena; Paradise, NV
Dec 23, 2018*; 2:00 pm		vs. SIU Edwardsville; Las Vegas Classic Visitors 3rd place game	L 72–82	6–5	Orleans Arena; Paradise, NV
Big Sky regular season
Dec 29, 2018; 8:00 pm		at Sacramento State	W 70–65	7–5 (1–0)	Hornets Nest (581); Sacramento, CA
Dec 31, 2018; 3:00 pm		at Portland State	W 73–60	8–5 (2–0)	Viking Pavilion (735); Portland, OR
Jan 5, 2019; 7:00 pm, Pluto TV		Idaho	W 83–79	9–5 (3–0)	Bank of Colorado Arena; Greeley, CO
Jan 7, 2019; 7:00 pm, Pluto TV		Eastern Washington	W 75–63	10–5 (4–0)	Bank of Colorado Arena (1,389); Greeley, CO
Jan 12, 2019; 2:00 pm, Pluto TV		Montana	L 64–88	10–6 (4–1)	Bank of Colorado Arena (2,124); Greeley, CO
Jan 14, 2019; 7:00 pm, Pluto TV		at Montana State	W 73–70	11–6 (5–1)	Brick Breeden Fieldhouse (2,706); Bozeman, MT
Jan 19, 2019; 7:00 pm, Pluto TV		at Weber State	L 64–78	11–7 (5–2)	Dee Events Center (7,891); Ogden, UT
Jan 21, 2019; 7:00 pm, Pluto TV		at Idaho State	W 77–53	12–7 (6–2)	Reed Gym (1,705); Pocatello, ID
Jan 24, 2019; 7:00 pm, Pluto TV		Southern Utah	W 79–68	13–7 (7–2)	Bank of Colorado Arena (1,368); Greeley, CO
Jan 26, 2019; 6:00 pm		at Northern Arizona	W 63–48	14–7 (8–2)	Walkup Skydome (1,089); Flagstaff, AZ
Feb 4, 2019; 7:00 pm, Pluto TV		Montana State	L 66–69	14–8 (8–3)	Bank of Colorado Arena (1,409); Greeley, CO
Feb 7, 2018; 7:00 pm, Pluto TV		Portland State	W 80–62	15–8 (9–3)	Bank of Colorado Arena (1,547); Greeley, CO
Feb 9, 2018; 7:00 pm, Pluto TV		Sacramento State	W 65–59	16–8 (10–3)	Bank of Colorado Arena (1,637); Greeley, CO
Feb 14, 2019; 8:00 pm, Pluto TV		at Idaho	W 75–47	17–8 (11–3)	Cowan Spectrum (409); Moscow, ID
Feb 16, 2019; 3:00 pm		at Eastern Washington	L 78–88 ^{OT}	17–9 (11–4)	Reese Court (1,481); Cheney, WA
Feb 25, 2019; 7:00 pm		at Montana	W 74–72	18–9 (12–4)	Dahlberg Arena (3,773); Missoula, MT
Feb 28, 2019; 7:00 pm, Pluto TV		Weber State	W 85–61	19–9 (13–4)	Bank of Colorado Arena (2,169); Greeley, CO
Mar 2, 2019; 7:00 pm, Pluto TV		Idaho State	W 71–62	20–9 (14–4)	Bank of Colorado Arena (2,024); Greeley, CO
Mar 7, 2019; 6:30 pm		at Southern Utah	W 70–53	21–9 (15–4)	America First Events Center (2,172); Cedar City, UT
Mar 9, 2019; 5:00 pm, Pluto TV		Northern Arizona	L 78–89	21–10 (15–5)	Bank of Colorado Arena (1,854); Greeley, CO
Big Sky tournament
Mar 14, 2019; 5:30 pm, Eleven	(2)	vs. (7) Southern Utah; Quarterfinals	L 64–83	21–11	CenturyLink Arena; Boise, ID
*Non-conference game. ^{#}Rankings from AP Poll. (#) Tournament seedings in parentheses. All times are in Mountain Time.
