= 2018–19 Idaho Vandals men's basketball team =

American college basketball season

2018–19 Idaho Vandals men's basketball
- Conference: Big Sky Conference
- Record: 5–27 (2–18 Big Sky)
- Head coach: Don Verlin (11th season)
- Assistant coaches: Tim Murphy; Kirk Earlywine; Zac Claus
- Home arena: Cowan Spectrum, Memorial Gym

2018–19 Big Sky men's basketball standings
	Conf.				Overall
Team	W		L	PCT	W		L	PCT
Montana †	16	–	4	.800	26	–	9	.743
Northern Colorado	15	–	5	.750	21	–	11	.656
Eastern Washington	12	–	8	.600	16	–	18	.471
Weber State	11	–	9	.550	18	–	15	.545
Portland State	11	–	9	.550	16	–	16	.500
Montana State	11	–	9	.550	15	–	17	.469
Southern Utah	9	–	11	.450	17	–	17	.500
Northern Arizona	8	–	12	.400	10	–	21	.323
Sacramento State	8	–	12	.400	15	–	16	.484
Idaho State	7	–	13	.350	11	–	19	.367
Idaho	2	–	18	.100	5	–	27	.156
† Conference tournament winner

The 2018–19 Idaho Vandals men's basketball team represented the University of Idaho in the Big Sky Conference during the 2018–19 NCAA Division I men's basketball season. Led by eleventh-year head coach Don Verlin, the Vandals played their home games at Cowan Spectrum, with a few early-season games at Memorial Gym, both on campus in Moscow, Idaho. They finished the season at 5–27 (2–18 in Big Sky, last). Idaho lost in the first round of the conference tournament to Montana State.

On June 14, 2019, head coach Don Verlin was fired amid possible NCAA violations. He finished at Idaho with an 11-year record of 177–176.

== Previous season ==
The Vandals finished the 2017–18 season 22–9, 14–4 in Big Sky play, to finish in second place. They lost in the quarterfinals of the Big Sky tournament to Southern Utah.

== Offseason ==
=== Departures ===
Name	Number	Pos.	Height	Weight	Year	Hometown	Reason for departure
Perrion Callandret	1	G	6'2"	180	RS senior	Bothell, WA	Graduated
Brayon Blake	4	F	6'7"	215	Senior	Seattle, WA	Graduated
Victor Sanders	11	G	6'5"	190	Senior	Portland, OR	Graduated
Chad Sherwood	14	G	6'2"	185	Senior	Albany, OR	Walk-on; graduated
Arkadiy Mkrtychyan	21	F	6'7"	225	Senior	Portland, OR	Graduated
Garrett Kingman	22	G/F	6'6"	205	Freshman	Gig Harbor, WA	Transferred
Jordan Scott	44	F	6'6"	200	Senior	Colorado Springs, CO	Graduated

=== Incoming transfers ===
Name	Number	Pos.	Height	Weight	Year	Hometown	Previous school
Xavier Smith	11	G	6'4"	180	Sophomore	Seattle, WA	Transferred from Oregon State. Under NCAA transfer rules, Smith had to sit out for the 2018–19 season. Had three years of remaining eligibility.
Marquell Fraser	15	G	6'5"	205	Junior	Hamilton, ON	Junior college transferred from Midland College
Tomás Domingos	32	C	7'0"	240	Sophomore	Lisbon, Portugal	Junior college transferred from College of Southern Idaho

=== 2018 recruiting class ===
College recruiting
Name	Hometown	School	Height	Weight	Commit date
RayQuawndis Mitchell; SG	Blaine, MN	Blaine High School	6 ft 4 in (1.93 m)	185 lb (84 kg)	Jun 5, 2018
RayQuawndis Mitchell; SG	Recruit ratings: Scout: Rivals: (NR)				
Cameron Tyson; SG	Bothell, WA	Bothell High School	6 ft 3 in (1.91 m)	185 lb (84 kg)	Mar 14, 2018
Cameron Tyson; SG	Recruit ratings: Scout: Rivals: (NR)				
Khadim Samb; SF	Marietta, GA	Sprayberry High School	6 ft 6 in (1.98 m)	185 lb (84 kg)	Oct 18, 2017
Khadim Samb; SF	Recruit ratings: Scout: Rivals: (NR)				
Overall recruit ranking:
Note: In many cases, Scout, Rivals, 247Sports, On3, and ESPN may conflict in their listings of height and weight.; In these cases, the average was taken. ESPN grades are on a 100-point scale.; Sources: "2018 Team Ranking". Rivals.

== Roster ==
2018–19 Idaho Vandals men's basketball team
Players
Coaches

Pos.	#	Name	Height	Weight	Year	Previous school	Hometown
G	0	RayQuawndis Mitchell	6 ft 4 in (1.93 m)	180 lb (82 kg)	Fr	Blaine HS	Blaine, MN
G	3	Losini Kamara	6 ft 3 in (1.91 m)	180 lb (82 kg)	RS Fr	Park Center HS	Brooklyn Park, MN
G	5	Tyson Cameron	6 ft 3 in (1.91 m)	185 lb (84 kg)	Fr	Bothell HS	Bothell, WA
G	11	Xavier Smith (redshirt)	6 ft 4 in (1.93 m)	180 lb (82 kg)	So	O'Dea HS; Oregon State	Seattle, WA
G/F	12	Chance Garvin	6 ft 4 in (1.93 m)	180 lb (82 kg)	So	Lake Roosevelt HS	Coulee Dam, WA
G	13	Geno West	6 ft 2 in (1.88 m)	160 lb (73 kg)	So	Jefferson HS	Portland, OR
F	14	Nate Sherwood	6 ft 8 in (2.03 m)	210 lb (95 kg)	RS Sr	West Albany HS	Albany, OR
G	15	Marquell Fraser	6 ft 4 in (1.93 m)	200 lb (91 kg)	Jr	The Hill Academy; Midland College	Hamilton, ON
F	20	Jared Rodriguez	6 ft 8 in (2.03 m)	180 lb (82 kg)	RS Fr	Mountain Ridge HS	Glendale, AZ
F	24	Khadim Samb	6 ft 6 in (1.98 m)	185 lb (84 kg)	Fr	Sprayberry HS	Marietta, GA
G	25	Trevon Allen	6 ft 2 in (1.88 m)	180 lb (82 kg)	Jr	Clarkston HS	Lapwai, ID
F/C	31	Cassius Smits-Francisco	6 ft 9 in (2.06 m)	230 lb (104 kg)	RS Fr	Cactus Shadows HS	Cave Creek, AZ
C	32	Tomás Domingos	7 ft 0 in (2.13 m)	240 lb (109 kg)	So	Elite Prep; Southern Idaho	Lisbon, Portugal
F	34	Scott Blakney	6 ft 9 in (2.06 m)	225 lb (102 kg)	So	Prosser HS	Prosser, WA

Head coach

- Don Verlin (Colorado State)

Assistant coach(es)

- Tim Murphy (Colorado State)
- Kirk Earlywine (Campbell)
- Zac Claus (Eastern Washington)

Legend

- (C) Team captain
- (S) Suspended
- (I) Ineligible
- (W) Walk-on
- Injured
- Current redshirt

Roster
Last update: July 23, 2024

== Schedule and results ==
Date time, TV	Rank^{#}	Opponent^{#}	Result	Record	High points	High rebounds	High assists	Site (attendance) city, state
Exhibition
November 2, 2018*; 7:30 p.m.		Lewis–Clark State	L 59–65		16 – Allen	6 – Blakney	4 – Allen	Memorial Gym (912); Moscow, ID
Non-conference regular season
November 6, 2018*; 7:00 p.m., BIG WEST TV		at UC Irvine	L 68–86	0–1	18 – Rodriguez	5 – Rodriguez	5 – Allen	Bren Events Center (1,058); Irvine, CA
November 13, 2018*; 7:00 p.m., Pluto TV		Nicholls State	L 80–83	0–2	22 – Tyson	12 – Fraser	6 – Fraser	Memorial Gym (413); Moscow, ID
November 18, 2018*; 2:00 p.m., Pluto TV		Bethesda; Vandal Holiday Hoops Showcase	W 87–59	1–2	21 – Tyson	12 – Blakney	8 – West	Memorial Gym (329); Moscow, ID
November 23, 2018*; 7:00 p.m., Pluto TV		vs. Northwest Nazarene; Vandal Holiday Hoops Showcase	L 73–77	1–3	24 – Allen	6 – West	5 – West	CenturyLink Arena (1,817); Boise, ID
November 24, 2018*; 7:00 p.m., Pluto TV		vs. UC Santa Barbara; Vandal Holiday Hoops Showcase	L 55–66	1–4	19 – Allen	8 – Allen	3 – Allen	CenturyLink Arena (1,689); Boise, ID
November 27, 2018*; 7:00 p.m., Pluto TV		West Coast Baptist; Vandal Holiday Hoops Showcase	W 98–44	2–4	16 – Tyson	8 – Allen	4 – Smith	Memorial Gym (319); Moscow, ID
December 1, 2018*; 1:00 p.m.		at North Dakota	W 67–54	3–4	19 – Allen	8 – Rodriguez	4 – Allen	Betty Engelstad Sioux Center (1,684); Grand Forks, ND
December 5, 2018*; 6:00 p.m., P12N		at Washington State; Battle of the Palouse	L 70–90	3–5	17 – Allen	7 – Allen	3 – Allen	Beasley Coliseum (2,748); Pullman, WA
December 8, 2018*; 7:00 p.m., Pluto TV		Cal State Bakersfield	L 67–73	3–6	15 – Allen	6 – Blakney	4 – Allen	Memorial Gym (539); Moscow, ID
December 15, 2018*; 3:00 p.m., Pluto TV		Omaha	L 80–89	3–7	15 – Allen	8 – Allen	4 – Fraser	Cowan Spectrum (459); Moscow, ID
December 21, 2018*; 7:00 p.m.		at Santa Clara	L 56–77	3–8	17 – Rodriguez	11 – Rodriguez	4 – Fraser	Leavey Center (1,109); Santa Clara, CA
Big Sky regular season
December 29, 2018; 8:00 p.m.		Idaho State	L 55–72	3–9 (0–1)	19 – Tyson	8 – Smits-Francisco	2 – Garvin	Cowan Spectrum (659); Moscow, ID
December 31, 2018; 2:00 p.m.		Weber State	L 87–93	310 (0–2)	27 – Tyson	4 – Rodriguex	3 – Allen	Cowan Spectrum (512); Moscow, ID
January 3, 2019; 12:00 p.m.		Eastern Washington	W 74–71	4–10 (1–2)	25 – Allen	7 – Rodriguez	4 – Smith	Cowan Spectrum (1,069); Moscow, ID
January 5, 2019; 6:00 p.m.		at Northern Colorado	L 79–83 ^{OT}	4–11 (1–3)	20 – Rodriguez	11 – Rodriguez	5 – Garvin	Bank of Colorado Arena (1,550); Greeley, CO
January 10, 2019; 7:00 p.m.		Montana State	L 67–77	4–12 (1–4)	23 – Allen	6 – Rodriguez	4 – Allen	Cowan Spectrum (1,029); Moscow, ID
January 19, 2019; 7:00 p.m.		Montana	L 51–69	4–13 (1–5)	24 – Allen	9 – Rodriguez	2 – Smith	Cowan Spectrum (1,419); Moscow, ID
January 24, 2019; 7:05 p.m.		at Sacramento State	L 48–69	4–14 (1–6)	11 – Rodriguez	9 – Rodriguez	3 – Rodriguez	Hornets Nest (634); Sacramento, CA
January 26, 2019; 7:05 p.m.		at Portland State	L 53–69	4–15 (1–7)	12 – Blakney	7 – Blakney	5 – Allen	Viking Pavilion (1,450); Portland, OR
February 2, 2019; 7:00 p.m.		Northern Arizona	L 73–86	4–16 (1–8)	19 – Rodriguez	6 – Smits-Francisco	2 – Tyson	Cowan Spectrum (1,089); Moscow, ID
February 4, 2019; 7:00 p.m.		Southern Utah	L 64–75	4–17 (1–9)	20 – Tyson	10 – Rodriguez	5 – Allen	Cowan Spectrum (634); Moscow, ID
February 7, 2019; 6:00 p.m.		at Montana	L 59–100	4–18 (1–10)	13 – Allen	8 – Rodriguez	3 – Smith	Dahlberg Arena (3,381); Missoula, MT
February 9, 2019; 1:00 p.m.		at Montana State	L 72–86	4–19 (1–11)	14 – Tyson	8 – Rodriguez	5 – Allen	Brick Breeden Fieldhouse (3,004); Bozeman, MT
February 14, 2019; 7:00 p.m.		Northern Colorado	L 47–75	4–20 (1–12)	15 – Allen	8 – Blakney	2 – Allen	Cowan Spectrum (409); Moscow, ID
February 18, 2019; 7:15 p.m.		at Eastern Washington	L 57–82	4–21 (1–13)	18 – Tyson	5 – Allen	5 – Allen	Reese Court (1,618); Cheney, WA
February 21, 2019; 5:30 p.m.		at Northern Arizona	L 54–75	4–22 (1–14)	15 – Tyson	10 – Rodriguez	6 – West	Walkup Skydome (614); Flagstaff, AZ
February 23, 2019; 1:00 p.m.		at Southern Utah	L 76–85	4–23 (1–15)	28 – Rodriguez	11 – Rodriguez	5 – Allen	America First Events Center (1,604); Cedar City, UT
February 28, 2019; 7:00 p.m.		Portland State	L 65–67	4–24 (1–16)	13 – Rodriguez	11 – Smits-Francisco	5 – Allen	Cowan Spectrum (579); Moscow, ID
March 2, 2019; 7:00 p.m.		Sacramento State	W 94–90	5–24 (2–16)	29 – Allen	9 – Rodriguez	4 – Allen	Cowan Spectrum; Moscow, ID
March 7, 2019; 6:00 p.m.		at Weber State	L 59–93	5–25 (2–17)	17 – Tyson	6 – Rodriguez	3 – Mitchell	Dee Events Center (6,381); Ogden, UT
March 9, 2019; 6:05 p.m.		at Idaho State	L 68–70	5–26 (2–18)	20 – Allen	7 – Allen	4 – Rodriguez	Holt Arena (1,951); Pocatello, ID
Big Sky tournament
March 13, 2019; 2:30 p.m., Pluto TV	(11)	vs. (6) Montana State; First round	L 71–75	5–27	21 – Allen	7 – Rodriguez	4 – Kamara	CenturyLink Arena; Boise, ID
*Non-conference game. ^{#}Rankings from AP poll. (#) Tournament seedings in parentheses. All times are in Pacific.
