= 2018–19 Montana Grizzlies basketball team =

American college basketball season

2018–19 Montana Grizzlies basketball

Big Sky regular season and tournament champions

NCAA tournament, First Round
- Conference: Big Sky Conference
- Record: 26–9 (16–4 Big Sky)
- Head coach: Travis DeCuire (5th season)
- Assistant coaches: Chris Cobb; Rachi Wortham; Jay Flores
- Home arena: Dahlberg Arena

2018–19 Big Sky men's basketball standings
	Conf.				Overall
Team	W		L	PCT	W		L	PCT
Montana †	16	–	4	.800	26	–	9	.743
Northern Colorado	15	–	5	.750	21	–	11	.656
Eastern Washington	12	–	8	.600	16	–	18	.471
Weber State	11	–	9	.550	18	–	15	.545
Portland State	11	–	9	.550	16	–	16	.500
Montana State	11	–	9	.550	15	–	17	.469
Southern Utah	9	–	11	.450	17	–	17	.500
Northern Arizona	8	–	12	.400	10	–	21	.323
Sacramento State	8	–	12	.400	15	–	16	.484
Idaho State	7	–	13	.350	11	–	19	.367
Idaho	2	–	18	.100	5	–	27	.156
† Conference tournament winner

The 2018–19 Montana Grizzlies basketball team represented the University of Montana during the 2018–19 NCAA Division I men's basketball season. The Grizzlies, led by fifth-year head coach Travis DeCuire, played their home games at Dahlberg Arena in Missoula, Montana as members of the Big Sky Conference. Finishing the season 26–9 overall, 16–4 in Big Sky play, the Grizzlies won the Big Sky regular season championship. As the No. 1 seed in the Big Sky tournament, they defeated Sacramento State, Weber State, and Eastern Washington to win the tournament, and earned the Big Sky's automatic bid to the NCAA tournament.

Given a No. 15 seed in the West Region of the NCAA Tournament, Montana was defeated by Michigan in the first round for the second consecutive year.

== Previous season ==
The Grizzlies finished the 2017–18 season 26–8, 16–2 in Big Sky play to win the Big Sky regular season championship. They defeated North Dakota, Northern Colorado, and Eastern Washington to be champions of the Big Sky tournament. They earned the Big Sky's automatic bid to the NCAA tournament where they lost in the first round to Michigan.

== Offseason ==
=== Departures ===
Name	Number	Pos.	Height	Weight	Year	Hometown	Reason for departure
Niko Bevens	3	G	6'6"	214	Sophomore	Beaverton, OR	Transferred to Alaska Anchorage
Joirdon Nicholas	5	F	6'7"	185	Freshman	Pearland, TX	Transferred to Stephen F. Austin
Lars Espe	10	G	6'1"	165	Freshman	Bergen, Norway	Transferred to Barry
Trevor Spoja	13	G	6'3"	164	Sophomore	Billings, MT	Walk-on; left the team for personal reasons
Fabijan Krslovic	20	F	6'8"	239	Senior	Sydney, Australia	Graduated
Admir Besovic	40	C	7'0"	240	Freshman	Sarajevo, Bosnia and Herzegovina	Transferred to Santa Fe College

=== Incoming transfers ===
Name	Number	Pos.	Height	Weight	Year	Hometown	Previous School
Kendal Manuel	12	G	6'4"	190	RS Junior	Billings, MT	Transferred from Oregon State. Under NCAA transfer rules, Orizu will have to sit out for the 2018–19 season. Will have two years of remaining eligibility.
Tony Miller	34	F	6'6"	210	Junior	Woodinville, WA	Transferred from Seattle Pacific. Under NCAA transfer rules, Miller will have to sit out for the 2018–19 season. Will have two years of remaining eligibility.

== 2018 recruiting class ==
College recruiting information
Name	Hometown	School	Height	Weight	Commit date
Ben Carter; C	Adelaide, Australia	Sacred Heart College	6 ft 10 in (2.08 m)	270 lb (120 kg)	May 18, 2018
Ben Carter; C	Recruit ratings: Scout: Rivals: (NR)				
Mack Anderson; SF	Bozeman, MT	Bozeman High School	6 ft 8 in (2.03 m)	200 lb (91 kg)	Aug 3, 2017
Mack Anderson; SF	Recruit ratings: Scout: Rivals: (NR)				
Overall recruit ranking:
Note: In many cases, Scout, Rivals, 247Sports, On3, and ESPN may conflict in their listings of height and weight.; In these cases, the average was taken. ESPN grades are on a 100-point scale.; Sources: "2018 Team Ranking". Rivals.

=== 2019 recruiting class ===
College recruiting information (2019)
Name	Hometown	School	Height	Weight	Commit date
Josh Vazquez #70 PG	Torrance, CA	Bishop Montgomery High School	6 ft 3 in (1.91 m)	200 lb (91 kg)	Apr 12, 2018
Josh Vazquez #70 PG	Recruit ratings: Scout: Rivals: (59)				
Derrick Carter-Hollinger, Jr. SF	El Cajon, CA	Foothills Christian High School	6 ft 5 in (1.96 m)	185 lb (84 kg)	Sep 2, 2018
Derrick Carter-Hollinger, Jr. SF	Recruit ratings: Scout: Rivals: (NR)				
Overall recruit ranking:
Note: In many cases, Scout, Rivals, 247Sports, On3, and ESPN may conflict in their listings of height and weight.; In these cases, the average was taken. ESPN grades are on a 100-point scale.; Sources: "2019 Team Ranking". Rivals.

=== 2020 recruiting class ===
College recruiting information (2020)
Name	Hometown	School	Height	Weight	Commit date
Rollie Worster; PG	Missoula, MT	Hellgate High School	6 ft 3 in (1.91 m)	N/A	Oct 23, 2017
Rollie Worster; PG	Recruit ratings: Scout: Rivals: (NR)				
Overall recruit ranking:
Note: In many cases, Scout, Rivals, 247Sports, On3, and ESPN may conflict in their listings of height and weight.; In these cases, the average was taken. ESPN grades are on a 100-point scale.; Sources: "2020 Team Ranking". Rivals.

== Roster ==
2018–19 Montana Grizzlies men's basketball team
Players
Coaches

Pos.	#	Name	Height	Weight	Year	Previous school	Hometown
G	0	Michael Oguine	6 ft 2 in (1.88 m)	171 lb (78 kg)	Sr	Chaminade Prep	Porter Ranch, CA
G	1	Timmy Falls	6 ft 2 in (1.88 m)	171 lb (78 kg)	So	Dublin	Dublin, CA
F	2	Donaven Dorsey	6 ft 7 in (2.01 m)	214 lb (97 kg)	RS Sr	Timberline; Washington	Lacey, WA
G	3	Freddy Brown III (W)	6 ft 2 in (1.88 m)	164 lb (74 kg)	Fr	Nathan Hale	Seattle, WA
G	4	Sayeed Pridgett	6 ft 5 in (1.96 m)	195 lb (88 kg)	Jr	El Cerrito	Oakland, CA
G	10	Eddy Egun (W)	6 ft 4 in (1.93 m)	160 lb (73 kg)	Fr	El Camino Real	Woodland Hills, CA
G	12	Kendal Manuel	6 ft 4 in (1.93 m)	180 lb (82 kg)	RS Jr	Skyview; Oregon State	Billings, MT
F	13	Ben Carter	6 ft 10 in (2.08 m)	275 lb (125 kg)	Fr	Sacred Heart College	Adelaide, Australia
G	14	Ahmaad Rorie	6 ft 1 in (1.85 m)	175 lb (79 kg)	RS Sr	Lincoln; Oregon	Tacoma, WA
F	15	Jamar Akoh	6 ft 8 in (2.03 m)	253 lb (115 kg)	RS Sr	Los Osos HS; Cal State Fullerton	Rancho Cucamonga, CA
F	23	Mack Anderson	6 ft 9 in (2.06 m)	210 lb (95 kg)	Fr	Bozeman	Bozeman, MT
G	24	Bobby Moorehead	6 ft 7 in (2.01 m)	182 lb (83 kg)	Sr	Stadium	Tacoma, WA
F	32	Peter Jones (W)	6 ft 8 in (2.03 m)	225 lb (102 kg)	RS Fr	O'Dea	Seattle, WA
C	33	Kelby Kramer	6 ft 10 in (2.08 m)	220 lb (100 kg)	RS Fr	Rock Springs	Rock Springs, WY
F	34	Tony Miller	6 ft 6 in (1.98 m)	210 lb (95 kg)	Jr	Woodinville; Seattle Pacific	Woodinville, WA

Head coach

- Travis DeCuire (Montana)

Assistant coach(es)

- Chris Cobb (Menlo)
- Rachi Wortham (Eastern Washington)
- Jay Flores (Chico State)

Legend

- (C) Team captain
- (S) Suspended
- (I) Ineligible
- (W) Walk-on
- Injured
- Current redshirt

Roster

== Schedule and results ==
Date time, TV	Rank^{#}	Opponent^{#}	Result	Record	Site (attendance) city, state
Exhibition
Nov 2, 2018*; 7:00 pm, Pluto TV		Whitworth	W 90–58		Dahlberg Arena (3,073); Missoula, MT
Non-conference regular season
Nov 9, 2018*; 7:00 pm, SWX MT/Pluto TV		Georgia State	W 81–74	1–0	Dahlberg Arena (4,321); Missoula, MT
Nov 12, 2018*; 7:00 pm, Pluto TV		Montana Tech	W 79–55	2–0	Dahlberg Arena (3,024); Missoula, MT
Nov 16, 2018*; 9:00 am		vs. Incarnate Word; The Islands of the Bahamas Showcase Quarterfinals	W 93–66	3–0	Kendal Isaacs National Gymnasium (325); Nassau, Bahamas
Nov 17, 2018*; 5:00 pm		vs. Miami (OH); The Islands of the Bahamas Showcase semifinals	W 73–71	4–0	Kendal Isaacs National Gymnasium (543); Nassau, Bahamas
Nov 18, 2018*; 8:00 pm		vs. Georgia Southern; The Islands of the Bahamas Showcase championship	L 77–80	4–1	Kendal Isaacs National Gymnasium (634); Nassau, Bahamas
Nov 28, 2018*; 6:30 pm, FS1		at Creighton	L 72–98	4–2	CHI Health Center Omaha (16,457); Omaha, NE
Dec 3, 2018*; 7:00 pm, Pluto TV		College of Idaho	W 80–52	5–2	Dahlberg Arena (3,040); Missoula, MT
Dec 8, 2018*; 8:00 pm		at UC Irvine	L 51–60	5–3	Bren Events Center (1,237); Irvine, CA
Dec 17, 2018*; 7:00 pm, SWX MT/Pluto TV		North Dakota State	W 60–53	6–3	Dahlberg Arena (3,553); Missoula, MT
Dec 19, 2018*; 6:30 pm, P12N		at Arizona	L 42–61	6–4	McKale Center (12,925); Tucson, AZ
Dec 22, 2018*; 6:00 pm, ESPN+		at South Dakota State	W 85–74	7–4	Frost Arena (2,540); Vermillion, SD
Big Sky regular season
Dec 29, 2018; 2:00 pm, Pluto TV		at Northern Arizona	W 86–73	8–4 (1–0)	Walkup Skydome (856); Flagstaff, AZ
Dec 31, 2018; 6:30 pm, Pluto TV		at Southern Utah	W 89–76	9–4 (2–0)	America First Events Center (1,451); Cedar City, UT
Jan 3, 2019; 7:00 pm, Pluto TV		Sacramento State	W 87–56	10–4 (3–0)	Dahlberg Arena (3,920); Missoula, MT
Jan 5, 2019; 7:00 pm, Pluto TV		Portland State	L 74–77	10–5 (3–1)	Dahlberg Arena (4,408); Missoula, MT
Jan 10, 2019; 7:00 pm, Pluto TV		at Eastern Washington	L 71–78	10–6 (3–2)	Reese Court (1,578); Cheney, WA
Jan 12, 2019; 2:00 pm, Pluto TV		at Northern Colorado	W 88–64	11–6 (4–2)	Bank of Colorado Arena (2,124); Greeley, CO
Jan 19, 2019; 8:00 pm, Pluto TV		at Idaho	W 69–51	12–6 (5–2)	Cowan Spectrum (1,419); Moscow, ID
Jan 24, 2019; 7:00 pm, Pluto TV		Idaho State	W 80–69	13–6 (6–2)	Dahlberg Arena (4,076); Missoula, MT
Jan 26, 2019; 7:00 pm, Pluto TV		Weber State	W 75–68	14–6 (7–2)	Dahlberg Arena (5,547); Missoula, MT
Feb 2, 2019; 7:00 pm, Pluto TV		at Montana State	W 83–78	15–6 (8–2)	Brick Breeden Fieldhouse (6,013); Bozeman, MT
Feb 7, 2019; 7:00 pm, Pluto TV		Idaho	W 100–59	16–6 (9–2)	Dahlberg Arena (3,381); Missoula, MT
Feb 9, 2019; 7:00 pm, Pluto TV		Eastern Washington	W 75–74	17–6 (10–2)	Dahlberg Arena (5,005); Missoula, MT
Feb 14, 2019; 7:00 pm, Pluto TV		at Weber State	W 83–80	18–6 (11–2)	Dee Events Center (6,729); Ogden, UT
Feb 16, 2019; 7:00 pm, Pluto TV		at Idaho State	W 80–68	19–6 (12–2)	Reed Gym (1,503); Pocatello, ID
Feb 23, 2019; 7:00 pm, Pluto TV		Montana State	W 89–83	20–6 (13–2)	Dahlberg Arena (7,135); Missoula, MT
Feb 25, 2019; 7:00 pm, Pluto TV		Northern Colorado	L 72–74	20–7 (13–3)	Dahlberg Arena (3,773); Missoula, MT
Mar 2, 2019; 7:00 pm, Pluto TV		Southern Utah	W 70–54	21–7 (14–3)	Dahlberg Arena (4,383); Missoula, MT
Mar 4, 2019; 7:00 pm, Pluto TV		Northern Arizona	W 66–64	22–7 (15–3)	Dahlberg Arena (3,706); Missoula, MT
Mar 7, 2019; 8:00 pm, Pluto TV		at Portland State	L 69–81	22–8 (15–4)	Viking Pavilion (2,042); Portland, OR
Mar 9, 2019; 8:00 pm, Pluto TV		at Sacramento State	W 86–68	23–8 (16–4)	Hornets Nest (977); Sacramento, CA
Big Sky tournament
Mar 14, 2019; 12:00 pm, Eleven	(1)	vs. (9) Sacramento State; Quarterfinals	W 79–73	24–8	CenturyLink Arena; Boise, ID
Mar 15, 2019; 5:30 pm, Eleven	(1)	vs. (4) Weber St. Semifinals	W 78–49	25–8	CenturyLink Arena (2,900); Boise, ID
Mar 16, 2019; 6:00 pm, ESPNU	(1)	vs. (3) Eastern Washington; Championship	W 68–62	26–8	CenturyLink Arena (3,737); Boise, ID
NCAA tournament
Mar 21, 2019*; 7:20 pm, TNT	(15 W)	vs. (2 W) No. 8 Michigan; First Round	L 55–74	26–9	Wells Fargo Arena (16,360); Des Moines, IA
*Non-conference game. ^{#}Rankings from AP Poll. (#) Tournament seedings in parentheses. All times are in Mountain Time.

== See also ==
2018–19 Montana Lady Griz basketball team
