= 2018–19 Weber State Wildcats men's basketball team =

American college basketball season

2018–19 Weber State Wildcats men's basketball
- Conference: Big Sky Conference
- Record: 18–15 (11–9 Big Sky)
- Head coach: Randy Rahe (13th season)
- Assistant coaches: Eric Duft; Garrett Lever; David Marek
- Home arena: Dee Events Center

2018–19 Big Sky men's basketball standings
	Conf.				Overall
Team	W		L	PCT	W		L	PCT
Montana †	16	–	4	.800	26	–	9	.743
Northern Colorado	15	–	5	.750	21	–	11	.656
Eastern Washington	12	–	8	.600	16	–	18	.471
Weber State	11	–	9	.550	18	–	15	.545
Portland State	11	–	9	.550	16	–	16	.500
Montana State	11	–	9	.550	15	–	17	.469
Southern Utah	9	–	11	.450	17	–	17	.500
Northern Arizona	8	–	12	.400	10	–	21	.323
Sacramento State	8	–	12	.400	15	–	16	.484
Idaho State	7	–	13	.350	11	–	19	.367
Idaho	2	–	18	.100	5	–	27	.156
† Conference tournament winner

The 2018–19 Weber State Wildcats men's basketball team represented Weber State University during the 2018–19 NCAA Division I men's basketball season. The Wildcats were led by 13th-year head coach Randy Rahe and played their home games in the Dee Events Center in Ogden, Utah as members of the Big Sky Conference. They finished the season 18–15, 11–9 in Big Sky play to finish in a three-way tie for fourth place. They defeated Portland State in the quarterfinals of the Big Sky tournament to advance to the semifinals where they lost to Montana.

== Previous season ==
The Wildcats finished the 2017–18 season 20–11, 13–5 in Big Sky play to finish in a tie for third place. They lost in the quarterfinals of the Big Sky tournament to Northern Colorado.

== Offseason ==
=== Departures ===
Name	Number	Pos.	Height	Weight	Year	Hometown	Reason for departure
Riley Court	4	G	6'4"	180	Freshman	Pleasant Grove, UT	Transferred to Dixie State
Trevon Ary-Turner	21	G	6'3"	185	Freshman	Issaquah, WA	Transferred to Dartmouth
Ryan Richardson	22	G	6'4"	185	Senior	Mesa, AZ	Graduated
Eric Patten	24	F	6'6"	240	Sophomore	Orange, CA	Walk-on; graduate transferred Dixie State
Dusty Baker	25	G/F	6'4"	190	Senior	Rancho Santa Margarita, CA	Graduated
Anton Vialen	31	C	7'0"	230	Freshman	Espoo, Finland	Left the team for personal reasons

=== 2018 recruiting class ===
College recruiting information
Name	Hometown	School	Height	Weight	Commit date
Israel Barnes #46 PG	Wichita, KS	Wichita Southeast High School	6 ft 3 in (1.91 m)	165 lb (75 kg)	Oct 13, 2017
Israel Barnes #46 PG	Recruit ratings: Scout: Rivals: 247Sports: (78)				
Spencer Johnson #90 PG	American Fork, UT	American Fork High School	6 ft 5 in (1.96 m)	175 lb (79 kg)	Sep 23, 2015
Spencer Johnson #90 PG	Recruit ratings: Scout: Rivals: (64)				
Tim Fuller #95 PF	Gilbert, AZ	Highland High School	6 ft 9 in (2.06 m)	210 lb (95 kg)	Nov 11, 2015
Tim Fuller #95 PF	Recruit ratings: Scout: Rivals: (63)				
Caleb Nero; PG	Tulsa, OK	Tulsa Memorial High School	6 ft 2 in (1.88 m)	165 lb (75 kg)	Apr 16, 2018
Caleb Nero; PG	Recruit ratings: Scout: Rivals: (NR)				
Donatas Kupšas; PF	Joniškis, Lithuania	Long Island Lutheran	6 ft 8 in (2.03 m)	215 lb (98 kg)	Jan 9, 2018
Donatas Kupšas; PF	Recruit ratings: Scout: Rivals: 247Sports: (NR)				
Dima Zdor; PF	Ukraine	St. James School	6 ft 10 in (2.08 m)	225 lb (102 kg)	Jun 16, 2018
Dima Zdor; PF	Recruit ratings: Scout: Rivals: 247Sports: (NR)				
Overall recruit ranking:
Note: In many cases, Scout, Rivals, 247Sports, On3, and ESPN may conflict in their listings of height and weight.; In these cases, the average was taken. ESPN grades are on a 100-point scale.; Sources: "2018 Team Ranking". Rivals.

=== 2019 recruiting class ===
College recruiting information (2019)
Name	Hometown	School	Height	Weight	Commit date
Judah Jordan; PG	Landover, MD	Scotland Performance Institute	6 ft 1 in (1.85 m)	170 lb (77 kg)	Oct 3, 2018
Judah Jordan; PG	Recruit ratings: Scout: Rivals: (NR)				
Korbin Cunningham; PG	Bryan, TX	Rudder High School	6 ft 2 in (1.88 m)	170 lb (77 kg)	Sep 6, 2018
Korbin Cunningham; PG	Recruit ratings: Scout: Rivals: (NR)				
Overall recruit ranking:
Note: In many cases, Scout, Rivals, 247Sports, On3, and ESPN may conflict in their listings of height and weight.; In these cases, the average was taken. ESPN grades are on a 100-point scale.; Sources: "2019 Team Ranking". Rivals.

== Roster ==
2018–19 Weber State Wildcats men's basketball team
Players
Coaches

Pos.	#	Name	Height	Weight	Year	Previous school	Hometown
G	0	Caleb Nero	6 ft 2 in (1.88 m)	180 lb (82 kg)	Fr	Tulsa Memorial	Tulsa, OK
G	2	Ricky Nelson	6 ft 1 in (1.85 m)	170 lb (77 kg)	So	Episcopal	Houston, TX
C	3	Jordan Dallas	6 ft 10 in (2.08 m)	220 lb (100 kg)	Sr	Long Beach Poly	Long Beach, CA
G	5	Cody John	6 ft 3 in (1.91 m)	185 lb (84 kg)	RS Jr	Wasatch Academy	Toronto, ON
G	10	Jerrick Harding	6 ft 1 in (1.85 m)	170 lb (77 kg)	Jr	Wichita Southeast	Wichita, KS
F	11	Michal Kozak	6 ft 8 in (2.03 m)	220 lb (100 kg)	So	Get Better Academy	Plzeň, Czech Republic
G	12	Israel Barnes	6 ft 4 in (1.93 m)	170 lb (77 kg)	Fr	Wichita Southeast	Wichita, KS
F	13	Donatas Kupsas	6 ft 8 in (2.03 m)	215 lb (98 kg)	Fr	Long Island Lutheran	Joniškis, Lithuania
G	15	Caleb Leonhardt (W)	6 ft 4 in (1.93 m)	190 lb (86 kg)	RS Fr	Davis	Kaysville, UT
F	22	Alan Lang (W)	6 ft 7 in (2.01 m)	195 lb (88 kg)	RS Fr	Judge Memorial	Mobile, AL
F	23	Brekkott Chapman	6 ft 9 in (2.06 m)	215 lb (98 kg)	RS Sr	Roy; Utah	Roy, UT
F/C	24	Dima Zdor	6 ft 10 in (2.08 m)	210 lb (95 kg)	Fr	Saint James School	Yalta, Ukraine
G/F	25	Dusty Baker	6 ft 4 in (1.93 m)	190 lb (86 kg)	Sr	Tesoro; Saddleback College	Rancho Santa Margarita, CA
G	32	Spencer Johnson	6 ft 5 in (1.96 m)	175 lb (79 kg)	Fr	American Fork	American Fork, UT
F	33	Tim Fuller	6 ft 9 in (2.06 m)	210 lb (95 kg)	Fr	Highland	Gilbert, AZ
F	34	Brenden Morris (W)	6 ft 7 in (2.01 m)	185 lb (84 kg)	RS Jr	Ben Lomond	Syracuse, UT
F/C	44	Zach Braxton	6 ft 9 in (2.06 m)	250 lb (113 kg)	RS Sr	Highlands Ranch	Highlands Ranch, CO

Head coach

- Randy Rahe (Buena Vista)

Assistant coach(es)

- Eric Duft (Sterling (KS))
- Garrett Lever (Seattle)
- David Marek (Southern Utah)

Legend

- (C) Team captain
- (S) Suspended
- (I) Ineligible
- (W) Walk-on
- Injured
- Current redshirt

Roster

== Schedule and results ==
Date time, TV	Rank^{#}	Opponent^{#}	Result	Record	Site (attendance) city, state
Exhibition
Nov 1, 2018*; 7:00 pm		Chadron State	W 76–59		Dee Events Center; Ogden, UT
Non-conference regular season
Nov 6, 2018*; 8:00 pm, TheW.TV		at San Diego	L 66–83	0–1	Jenny Craig Pavilion (1,212); San Diego, CA
Nov 9, 2018*; 8:00 pm, Pluto TV		Bethesda; Junkanoo Jam	W 123–53	1–1	Dee Events Center (5,263); Ogden, UT
Nov 15, 2018*; 8:00 pm, FloHoops		vs. San Jose State; Junkanoo Jam Junkanoo Division quarterfinals	W 85–77	2–1	Gateway Christian Academy; Bimini, Bahamas
Nov 16, 2018*; 6:30, FloHoops		vs. Central Michigan; Junkanoo Jam Junkanoo Division	W 78–76	3–1	Gateway Christian Academy; Bimini, Bahamas
Nov 18, 2018*; 6:30 pm, FloHoops		vs. Cal State Bakersfield; Junkanoo Jam Junkanoo Division	L 67–68	3–2	Gateway Christian Academy (521); Bimini, Bahamas
Nov 27, 2018*; 7:00 pm, Pluto TV		Benedictine University at Mesa	W 100–61	4–2	Dee Events Center (5,821); Ogden, UT
Dec 1, 2018*; 7:00 pm, Pluto TV/KJZZ		BYU; Old Oquirrh Bucket	W 113–103	5–2	Dee Events Center (9,731); Ogden, UT
Dec 5, 2018*; 8:00 pm		at Fresno State	L 52–71	5–3	Save Mart Center (4,597); Fresno, CA
Dec 8, 2018*; 2:30 pm, ATTSNRM		vs. Utah State; Old Oquirrh Bucket/Beehive Classic	L 67–76	5–4	Vivint Smart Home Arena (10,678); Salt Lack City, UT
Dec 15, 2018*; 7:00 pm, KJZZ		Utah Valley; Old Oquirrh Bucket	L 63–75	5–5	Dee Events Center (7,021); Ogden, UT
Dec 22, 2018*; 2:00 pm		Delaware State	W 83–69	6–5	Dee Events Center (5,711); Ogden, UT
Big Sky regular season
Dec 29, 2018; 3:00 pm		at Eastern Washington	W 84–72	7–5 (1–0)	Reese Court (1,051); Cheney, WA
Dec 31, 2018; 3:00 pm		at Idaho	W 93–87	8–5 (2–0)	Cowan Spectrum (512); Moscow, ID
Jan 3, 2019; 7:00 pm		Northern Arizona	W 77–52	9–5 (3–0)	Dee Events Center (5,822); Ogden, UT
Jan 5, 2019; 7:00 pm, KJZZ		Southern Utah; Old Oquirrh Bucket	L 82–90 ^{OT}	9–6 (3–1)	Dee Events Center; Ogden, UT
Jan 12, 2019; 8:00 pm		at Portland State	W 95–88 ^{OT}	10–6 (4–1)	Viking Pavilion (1,655); Portland, OR
Jan 17, 2019; 7:00 pm		Idaho State	W 76–59	11–6 (5–1)	Dee Events Center (6,024); Ogden, UT
Jan 19, 2019; 7:00 pm		Northern Colorado	W 78–64	12–6 (6–1)	Dee Events Center (7,891); Ogden, UT
Jan 24, 2019; 7:00 pm		at Montana State	W 93–84	13–6 (7–1)	Brick Breeden Fieldhouse (2,535); Bozeman, MT
Jan 26, 2019; 7:00 pm		at Montana	L 68–75	13–7 (7–2)	Dahlberg Arena (5,547); Missoula, MT
Jan 31, 2019; 7:00 pm		Portland State	L 75–76	13–8 (7–3)	Dee Events Center (6,526); Ogden, UT
Feb 2, 2019; 7:00 pm		Sacramento State	W 75–65	14–8 (8–3)	Dee Events Center (7,034); Ogden, UT
Feb 7, 2019; 6:30 pm		at Southern Utah; Old Oquirrh Bucket	L 53–65	14–9 (8–4)	America First Events Center (3,069); Cedar City, UT
Feb 9, 2019; 2:00 pm		at Northern Arizona	W 86–71	15–9 (9–4)	Walkup Skydome (1,464); Flagstaff, AZ
Feb 14, 2019; 7:00 pm		Montana	L 80–83	15–10 (9–5)	Dee Events Center (6,729); Ogden, UT
Feb 16, 2019; 7:00 pm		Montana State	W 94–82	16–10 (10–5)	Dee Events Center (7,508); Ogden, UT
Feb 21, 2019; 8:00 pm		at Sacramento State	L 76–78	16–11 (10–6)	Hornets Nest (621); Sacramento, CA
Feb 28, 2019; 7:00 pm		at Northern Colorado	L 61–85	16–12 (10–7)	Bank of Colorado Arena (2,169); Greeley, CO
Mar 4, 2019; 7:00 pm		at Idaho State	L 74–78	16–13 (10–8)	Holt Arena; Pocatello, ID
Mar 7, 2019; 7:00 pm		Idaho	W 93–59	17–13 (11–8)	Dee Events Center (6,381); Ogden, UT
Mar 9, 2019; 7:00 pm		Eastern Washington	L 77–80	17–14 (11–9)	Dee Events Center (7,113); Ogden, UT
Big Sky tournament
Mar 14, 2019; 2:30 pm, Eleven	(4)	vs. (5) Portland State; Quarterfinals	W 81–71	18–14	CenturyLink Arena; Boise, ID
Mar 15, 2019; 5:30 pm, Eleven	(4)	vs. (1) Montana; Semifinals	L 49–78	18–15	CenturyLink Arena; Boise, ID
*Non-conference game. ^{#}Rankings from AP Poll. (#) Tournament seedings in parentheses. All times are in Mountain Time.
