= 2019 Big Sky Conference men's basketball tournament =

- Classification: Division I
- Season: 2018–19
- Teams: 11
- Site: CenturyLink Arena; Boise, Idaho
- Champions: Montana (11th title)
- Winning coach: Travis DeCuire (2nd title)
- MVP: Ahmaad Rorie (Montana)
- Television: Pluto TV, ELEVEN, ESPNU (final)

2018–19 Big Sky men's basketball standings
	Conf.				Overall
Team	W		L	PCT	W		L	PCT
Montana †	16	–	4	.800	26	–	9	.743
Northern Colorado	15	–	5	.750	21	–	11	.656
Eastern Washington	12	–	8	.600	16	–	18	.471
Weber State	11	–	9	.550	18	–	15	.545
Portland State	11	–	9	.550	16	–	16	.500
Montana State	11	–	9	.550	15	–	17	.469
Southern Utah	9	–	11	.450	17	–	17	.500
Northern Arizona	8	–	12	.400	10	–	21	.323
Sacramento State	8	–	12	.400	15	–	16	.484
Idaho State	7	–	13	.350	11	–	19	.367
Idaho	2	–	18	.100	5	–	27	.156
† Conference tournament winner

The 2019 Big Sky Conference men's basketball tournament was the postseason tournament for the Big Sky Conference, held March 13–16 at CenturyLink Arena in Boise, Idaho. It was the 44th edition of the tournament, which debuted in 1976.

Regular season and defending tournament champion Montana defeated Eastern Washington 68–62 in the championship game to gain the conference's automatic bid to the 68-team NCAA tournament. It was Montana's eleventh Big Sky tournament title, which leads the conference; its first came in 1991.

== Seeds ==
The eleven teams were seeded by conference record, with a tiebreaker to seed teams with identical conference records. The top five teams received a first round bye.

Seed	School	Record	Tiebreaker 1
1	Montana	16–4	
2	Northern Colorado	15–5	
3	Eastern Washington	12–8	
4	Weber State	11–9	3–1 vs. Portland State/Montana State
5	Portland State	11–9	2–2 vs. Weber State/Montana State
6	Montana State	11–9	1–3 vs. Weber State/Portland State
7	Southern Utah	9–11	
8	Northern Arizona	8–12	1–1 vs. Northern Colorado
9	Sacramento State	8–12	0–2 vs. Northern Colorado
10	Idaho State	7–13	
11	Idaho	2–18	

== Schedule ==
Session	Game	Time	Matchup	Score	Television	Attendance
First round – Wednesday, March 13
1	1	9:30 am	No. 8 Northern Arizona vs. No. 9 Sacramento State	60–72	Pluto TV 231	
1	2	12:00 pm	No. 7 Southern Utah vs. No. 10 Idaho State	94–80	Pluto TV 231	
1	3	2:30 pm	No. 6 Montana State vs. No. 11 Idaho	75–71	Pluto TV 231	
Quarterfinals – Thursday, March 14
2	4	12:00 pm	No. 1 Montana vs. No. 9 Sacramento State	79–73	Eleven	
2	5	2:30 pm	No. 4 Weber State vs. No. 5 Portland State	81–71	Eleven	
3	6	5:30 pm	No. 2 Northern Colorado vs. No. 7 Southern Utah	64–83	Eleven	
3	7	8:00 pm	No. 3 Eastern Washington vs. No. 6 Montana State	90–84	Eleven	
Semifinals – Friday, March 15
4	8	5:30 pm	No. 1 Montana vs No. 4 Weber State	78–49	Eleven	
4	9	8:00 pm	No. 7 Southern Utah vs No. 3 Eastern Washington	61–77	Eleven	
Championship game – Saturday, March 16
5	10	6:00 pm	No. 1 Montana vs No. 3 Eastern Washington	68–62	ESPNU	
Game times in MT. Rankings denote tournament seeding.

== Bracket ==
First round Wednesday, March 13
8	Northern Arizona	60
9	Sacramento State	72
7	Southern Utah	94
10	Idaho State	80
6	Montana State	75
11	Idaho	71

Quarterfinals; Thursday, March 14
1	Montana	79
9	Sacramento State	73
4	Weber State	81
5	Portland State	71
2	Northern Colorado	64
7	Southern Utah	83
3	Eastern Washington	90
6	Montana State	84

Semifinals; Friday, March 15
1	Montana	78
4	Weber State	49
7	Southern Utah	61
3	Eastern Washington	77

Championship; Saturday, March 16
1	Montana	68
3	Eastern Washington	62
