= 2018–19 Portland State Vikings men's basketball team =

American college basketball season

2018–19 Portland State Vikings men's basketball
- Conference: Big Sky Conference
- Record: 16–16 (11–9 Big Sky)
- Head coach: Barret Peery (2nd season)
- Assistant coaches: Jase Coburn; Chris Skinkis; Zach Payne
- Home arena: Viking Pavilion

2018–19 Big Sky men's basketball standings
| | Conf. | | | | Overall |
| Team | W | | L | PCT | W | | L | PCT |
|---|---|---|---|---|---|---|---|---|
| Montana † | 16 | – | 4 | .800 | 26 | – | 9 | .743 |
| Northern Colorado | 15 | – | 5 | .750 | 21 | – | 11 | .656 |
| Eastern Washington | 12 | – | 8 | .600 | 16 | – | 18 | .471 |
| Weber State | 11 | – | 9 | .550 | 18 | – | 15 | .545 |
| Portland State | 11 | – | 9 | .550 | 16 | – | 16 | .500 |
| Montana State | 11 | – | 9 | .550 | 15 | – | 17 | .469 |
| Southern Utah | 9 | – | 11 | .450 | 17 | – | 17 | .500 |
| Northern Arizona | 8 | – | 12 | .400 | 10 | – | 21 | .323 |
| Sacramento State | 8 | – | 12 | .400 | 15 | – | 16 | .484 |
| Idaho State | 7 | – | 13 | .350 | 11 | – | 19 | .367 |
| Idaho | 2 | – | 18 | .100 | 5 | – | 27 | .156 |
† Conference tournament winner

The 2018–19 Portland State Vikings men's basketball team represented Portland State University during the 2018–19 NCAA Division I men's basketball season. The Vikings, led by second-year head coach Barret Peery, played their return home games at Viking Pavilion in Portland, Oregon after a one year renovation, as members of the Big Sky Conference. They finished the season 16–16, 11–9 in Big Sky play to finish in a three-way tie for fourth place. They lost in the quarterfinals of the Big Sky tournament to Weber State.

== Previous season ==
The Vikings finished the 2017–18 season 20–14, 9–9 in Big Sky play to finish in a tie for sixth place. They defeated Sacramento State in the first round of the Big Sky tournament before losing in the quarterfinals to Eastern Washington. They were invited to the CollegeInsider.com Tournament where, after a first round bye, lost in the second round to San Diego.

== Offseason ==
=== Departures ===
| Name | Number | Pos. | Height | Weight | Year | Hometown | Reason for departure |
|---|---|---|---|---|---|---|---|
| Bryce Canada | 0 | G | 6'4" | 200 | Senior | Portland, OR | Graduated |
| Brandon Hollins | 1 | F | 6'6" | 200 | Senior | St. Louis, MO | Graduated |
| Deontae North | 3 | G | 6'4" | 190 | Senior | Corona, CA | Graduated |
| Traylin Farris | 5 | C | 6'8" | 225 | Senior | Pearland, TX | Graduated |
| Devyn Wilson | 10 | G | 6'3" | 175 | Junior | Brooklyn, NY | Graduate transferred to Washburn |
| Braxton Tucker | 15 | F | 6'6" | 220 | RS Senior | Tacoma, WA | Graduated |
| Ryan Edwards | 44 | C | 7'1" | 290 | RS Senior | Kailspell, MT | Graduated |
| Tyrell Henderson | | G | 6'3" | 180 | Sophomore | Tempe, AZ | Transferred to Cal State San Bernardino |

=== Incoming transfers ===
| Name | Number | Pos. | Height | Weight | Year | Hometown | Previous School |
|---|---|---|---|---|---|---|---|
| Michael Nuga | 1 | G | 6'2" | 180 | Junior | Toronto, ON | Junior college transferred from Eastern Florida State College |
| Robert McCoy | 10 | G | 6'7" | 185 | Junior | Chicago, IL | Junior college transferred from San Diego City College |
| Juwan Williams | 22 | G | 6'4" | | Junior | Houston, TX | Junior college transferred from Panola College |
| Rashaad Goolsby | 23 | F | 6'7" | 190 | Junior | Phoenix, AZ | Junior college transferred from Phoenix College |
| Sal Nuhu | 35 | F | 6'8" | 210 | Junior | Bronx, NY | Junior college transferred from Hutchinson CC |

=== 2018 recruiting class ===
College recruiting information
| Name | Hometown | School | Height | Weight | Commit date |
|---|---|---|---|---|---|
| Kyle Greeley; SG | Salem, OR | West Salem High School | 6 ft 4 in (1.93 m) | 180 lb (82 kg) | Jul 24, 2017 |
| Kyle Greeley; SG | Recruit ratings: Scout: Rivals: (NR) | | | | |
| Trey Wood; PF | Anthem, AZ | Anthem Preparatory Academy | 6 ft 9 in (2.06 m) | 215 lb (98 kg) | Sep 19, 2017 |
| Trey Wood; PF | Recruit ratings: Scout: Rivals: (NR) | | | | |
| Filip Fullerton; C | Beaverton, OR | Southridge High School | 6 ft 9 in (2.06 m) | 210 lb (95 kg) | Aug 1, 2017 |
| Filip Fullerton; C | Recruit ratings: Scout: Rivals: (NR) | | | | |
Overall recruit ranking:
Note: In many cases, Scout, Rivals, 247Sports, On3, and ESPN may conflict in their listings of height and weight.; In these cases, the average was taken. ESPN grades are on a 100-point scale.; Sources: "2018 Team Ranking". Rivals.

=== 2019 recruiting class ===
College recruiting information (2019)
| Name | Hometown | School | Height | Weight | Commit date |
|---|---|---|---|---|---|
| Jaden Nielsen-Skinner; PG | Salem, OR | South Salem High School | 5 ft 10 in (1.78 m) | 160 lb (73 kg) | Oct 8, 2017 |
| Jaden Nielsen-Skinner; PG | Recruit ratings: Scout: Rivals: (NR) | | | | |
Overall recruit ranking:
Note: In many cases, Scout, Rivals, 247Sports, On3, and ESPN may conflict in their listings of height and weight.; In these cases, the average was taken. ESPN grades are on a 100-point scale.; Sources: "2019 Team Ranking". Rivals.

== Roster ==
2018–19 Portland State Vikings men's basketball team
Players
Coaches

| Pos. | # | Name | Height | Weight | Year | Previous school | Hometown |
|---|---|---|---|---|---|---|---|
| G | 0 | Derek Brown (W) | 6 ft 0 in (1.83 m) | 170 lb (77 kg) | Sr | Auburn Riverside HS; Everett CC | Federal Way, Washington |
| G | 1 | Michael Nuga | 6 ft 2 in (1.88 m) | 180 lb (82 kg) | Jr | Clarkson Academy; Eastern Florida State College | Toronto, Ontario |
| G | 2 | Michael Mayhew | 6 ft 2 in (1.88 m) | 195 lb (88 kg) | Sr | Marcus HS; Hill College | Flower Mound, Texas |
| G | 3 | Holland Woods | 6 ft 0 in (1.83 m) | 170 lb (77 kg) | So | Apollo HS | Glendale, Arizona |
| F | 4 | Brendan Rumel | 6 ft 10 in (2.08 m) | 235 lb (107 kg) | RS So | Rincon HS | Tucson, Arizona |
| G | 5 | Kyle Greeley | 6 ft 4 in (1.93 m) | 190 lb (86 kg) | Fr | West Salem HS | Salem, Oregon |
| F | 10 | Robert McCoy | 6 ft 7 in (2.01 m) | 185 lb (84 kg) | Jr | Eisenhower HS; San Diego CC | Chicago, Illinois |
| G | 11 | Deante Strickland | 5 ft 10 in (1.78 m) | 175 lb (79 kg) | Sr | Central Catholic HS; Casper CC | Portland, Oregon |
| F | 12 | Trey Wood | 6 ft 9 in (2.06 m) | 195 lb (88 kg) | Fr | Anthems Prep | Anthem, Arizona |
| F | 13 | Jamie Orme | 6 ft 7 in (2.01 m) | 200 lb (91 kg) | Sr | O'Dea HS; Highline CC | Seattle, Washington |
| G | 15 | Vonte Carter (W) | 6 ft 2 in (1.88 m) | 170 lb (77 kg) | Sr | Benson Tech HS | Portland, Oregon |
| G | 22 | Juwan Williams | 6 ft 5 in (1.96 m) | 200 lb (91 kg) | Jr | Travis HS; Panola College | Houston, Texas |
| F | 23 | Rashaad Goolsby | 6 ft 7 in (2.01 m) | 190 lb (86 kg) | Jr | Cesar Chavez HS; Phoenix College | Phoenix, Arizona |
| F | 32 | Filip Fullerton | 6 ft 9 in (2.06 m) | 210 lb (95 kg) | Fr | Southridge HS | Hillsboro, Oregon |
| F | 35 | Sal Nuhu | 6 ft 8 in (2.03 m) | 210 lb (95 kg) | Jr | Taft Educational; Hutchinson CC | Bronx, NY |

Head coach

- Barret Peery (Southern Utah)

Assistant coach(es)

- Jase Coburn (Arizona State)
- Chris Skinkis (UW–Parkside)
- Zach Payne (Whitworth)

Legend

- (C) Team captain
- (S) Suspended
- (I) Ineligible
- (W) Walk-on
- Injured
- Current redshirt

Roster

== Schedule and results ==
| Date time, TV | Rank^{#} | Opponent^{#} | Result | Record | Site (attendance) city, state |
Exhibition
| Nov 2, 2018*; 7:05 pm | | Multnomah | W 119–89 | | Viking Pavilion; Portland, OR |
Non-conference regular season
| Nov 6, 2018*; 8:00 pm, P12N | | at No. 14 Oregon | L 57–84 | 0–1 | Matthew Knight Arena (8,212); Eugene, OR |
| Nov 10, 2018*; 7:05 pm, Pluto TV | | UC Riverside | W 71–64 | 1–1 | Viking Pavilion (1,424); Portland, OR |
| Nov 17, 2018*; 7:05 pm, Pluto TV | | Willamette; Salute to Service | W 125–61 | 2–1 | Viking Pavilion (1,010); Portland, OR |
| Nov 23, 2018*; 3:30 pm, Pluto TV | | vs. UC Santa Barbara; Vandal Holiday Hoops Showcase | L 69–76 | 2–2 | CenturyLink Arena; Boise, ID |
| Nov 24, 2018*; 3:30 pm, Pluto TV | | vs. Northwest Nazarene; Vandal Holiday Hoops Showcase | W 91–75 | 3–2 | CenturyLink Arena; Boise, ID |
| Nov 28, 2018*; 7:00 pm, P12N | | at Stanford | L 67–79 | 3–3 | Maples Pavilion (3,240); Stanford, CA |
| Dec 1, 2018*; 7:05 pm, Pluto TV | | Portland Bible | W 123–40 | 4–3 | Viking Pavilion (593); Portland, OR |
| Dec 5, 2018*; 7:05 pm, Pluto TV | | Portland | W 87–78 | 5–3 | Viking Pavilion (2,020); Portland, OR |
| Dec 12, 2018*; 6:00 pm, BYUtv | | at BYU | L 66–85 | 5–4 | Marriott Center (11,563); Provo, UT |
| Dec 15, 2018*; 7:05 pm, Pluto TV | | Loyola Marymount | L 58–85 | 5–5 | Viking Pavilion (1,055); Portland, OR |
| Dec 20, 2018*; 7:05 pm, Pluto TV | | Cal State Bakersfield | L 71–76 | 5–6 | Viking Pavilion (646); Portland, OR |
Big Sky regular season
| Dec 31, 2018; 2:05 pm, Pluto TV | | Northern Colorado | L 60–73 | 5–7 (0–1) | Viking Pavilion (735); Portland, OR |
| Jan 3, 2019; 6:00 pm, Pluto TV | | at Montana State | L 88–98 | 5–8 (0–2) | Brick Breeden Fieldhouse (2,297); Bozeman, MT |
| Jan 5, 2019; 6:00 pm, Pluto TV | | at Montana | W 77–74 ^{OT} | 6–8 (1–2l) | Dahlberg Arena (4,408); Missoula, MT |
| Jan 12, 2019; 7:05 pm, Pluto TV | | Weber State | L 88–95 ^{OT} | 6–9 (1–3) | Viking Pavilion (1,655); Portland, OR |
| Jan 17, 2019; 5:30 pm, Pluto TV | | at Southern Utah | L 69–83 | 6–10 (1–4) | America First Events Center (2,307); Cedar City, UT |
| Jan 19, 2019; 1:00 pm, Pluto TV | | at Northern Arizona | L 75–82 | 6–11 (1–5) | Walkup Skydome (1,183); Flagstaff, AZ |
| Jan 24, 2019; 7:05 pm, Pluto TV | | Eastern Washington | W 78–65 | 7–11 (2–5) | Viking Pavilion (1,088); Portland, OR |
| Jan 26, 2019; 7:05 pm, Pluto TV | | Idaho | W 69–53 | 8–11 (3–5) | Viking Pavilion (1,450); Portland, OR |
| Jan 31, 2019; TBA, Pluto TV | | at Weber State | W 76–75 | 9–11 (4–5) | Dee Events Center (6,526); Ogden, UT |
| Feb 2, 2019; 6:05 pm, Pluto TV | | at Idaho State | L 67–69 | 9–12 (4–6) | Holt Arena (1,610); Pocatello, ID |
| Feb 7, 2019; 6:05 pm, Pluto TV | | at Northern Colorado | L 62–80 | 9–13 (4–7) | Bank of Colorado Arena (1,547); Greeley, CO |
| Feb 11, 2019; 7:35 pm, Pluto TV | | Sacramento State | L 67–78 | 9–14 (4–8) | The Nest (689); Sacramento, CA |
| Feb 14, 2019; 7:05 pm, Pluto TV | | Northern Arizona | W 103–94 | 10–14 (5–8) | Viking Pavilion (925); Portland, OR |
| Feb 16, 2019; 7:05 pm, Pluto TV | | Southern Utah | W 78–69 | 11–14 (6–8) | Viking Pavilion (1,130); Portland, OR |
| Feb 21, 2019; 7:05 pm, Pluto TV | | Idaho State | W 99–93 | 12–14 (7–8) | Viking Pavilion (842); Portland, OR |
| Feb 23, 2019; 7:05 pm, Pluto TV | | Sacramento State | W 65–57 | 13–14 (8–8) | Viking Pavilion (1,115); Portland, OR |
| Feb 28, 2019; 7:00 pm, Pluto TV | | Idaho | W 67–65 | 14–14 (9–8) | Viking Pavilion (579); Portland, OR |
| Mar 2, 2019; 2:05 pm, Pluto TV | | at Eastern Washington | L 66–68 | 14–15 (9–9) | Reese Court (1,502); Cheney, WA |
| Mar 7, 2019; 7:05 pm, Pluto TV | | Montana | W 81–69 | 15–15 (10–9) | Viking Pavilion; Portland, OR |
| Mar 9, 2019; 7:05 pm, Pluto TV | | Montana State | W 84–80 | 16–15 (11–9) | Viking Pavilion (2,077); Portland, OR |
Big Sky tournament
| Mar 14, 2019; 3:30 pm, Eleven | (5) | vs. (4) Weber State; Quarterfinals | L 71–81 | 16–16 | CenturyLink Arena; Boise, ID |
*Non-conference game. ^{#}Rankings from AP Poll. (#) Tournament seedings in parentheses. All times are in Pacific Time.

== See also ==
- 2018–19 Portland State Vikings women's basketball team
