= Idaho Vandals men's basketball statistical leaders =

The Idaho Vandals men's basketball statistical leaders are individual statistical leaders of the Idaho Vandals men's basketball program in various categories, including points, rebounds, assists, steals, and blocks. Within those areas, the lists identify single-game, single-season, and career leaders. The Vandals represent the University of Idaho in the NCAA's Big Sky Conference.

Idaho began competing in intercollegiate basketball in 1905. However, the school's record book does not generally list records from before the 1950s, as records from before this period are often incomplete and inconsistent. Since scoring was much lower in this era, and teams played much fewer games during a typical season, it is likely that few or no players from this era would appear on these lists anyway.

The NCAA did not officially record assists as a stat until the 1983–84 season, and blocks and steals until the 1985–86 season, but Idaho's record books includes players in these stats before these seasons. These lists are updated through the end of the 2023–24 season.

== Scoring ==
Career
Rank	Player	Points	Seasons
1	Orlando Lightfoot	2102	1991–92 1992–93 1993–94
2	Victor Sanders	1804	2014–15 2015–16 2016–17 2017–18
3	Stephen Madison	1624	2010–11 2011–12 2012–13 2013–14
4	Brian Kellerman	1585	1979–80 1980–81 1981–82 1982–83
5	Kenny Luckett	1571	1984–85 1985–86 1986–87 1987–88
6	Connor Hill	1508	2011–12 2012–13 2013–14 2014–15
7	Kyle Barone	1433	2009–10 2010–11 2011–12 2012–13
8	Trevon Allen	1395	2016–17 2017–18 2018–19 2019–20
9	Steve Weist	1357	1972–73 1973–74 1974–75 1975–76
10	Chuck White	1319	1960–61 1961–62 1962–63

Season
Rank	Player	Points	Season
1	Orlando Lightfoot	715	1992–93
2	Orlando Lightfoot	710	1993–94
3	Riley Smith	701	1989–90
4	Stephen Madison	684	2013–14
5	Orlando Lightfoot	677	1991–92
6	Victor Sanders	670	2016–17
7	Trevon Allen	647	2019–20
8	Isaac Jones	600	2022–23
9	Victor Sanders	589	2017–18
10	Divant'e Moffitt	585	2022–23

Single game
Rank	Player	Points	Season	Opponent
1	Orlando Lightfoot	50	1993–94	Gonzaga
2	Orlando Lightfoot	44	1992–93	Boise State
3	Isaac Jones	42	2022–23	Sacramento State
	Stephen Madison	42	2013–14	Utah Valley
	Steve Weist	42	1973–74	Western Wash.
6	Orlando Lightfoot	41	1991–92	Sacramento State
	Chuck White	41	1962–63	Montana State
8	Victor Sanders	40	2016–17	Portland State
	Orlando Lightfoot	40	1992–93	EWU
10	Bob Pipkin	39	1965–66	Idaho State

== Rebounds ==
Career
Rank	Player	Rebounds	Seasons
1	Deon Watson	877	1990–91 1991–92 1992–93 1993–94
2	Kyle Barone	869	2009–10 2010–11 2011–12 2012–13
3	Dwight Morrison	791	1951–52 1952–53 1953–54
4	Orlando Lightfoot	766	1991–92 1992–93 1993–94
5	Phil Hopson	733	1979–80 1980–81 1981–82 1982–83
6	Roger Davis	682	1971–72 1972–73 1973–74 1974–75
7	Tom Stalick	669	1983–84 1984–85 1985–86 1986–87
8	Tom Moreland	653	1961–62 1962–63 1963–64 1964–65
9	Ken Maren	648	1957–58 1958–59 1959–60 1960–61 1961–62
10	Stephen Madison	644	2010–11 2011–12 2012–13 2013–14

Season
Rank	Player	Rebounds	Season
1	Gus Johnson	466	1962–63
2	Dwight Morrison	333	1952–53
3	Tom Moreland	321	1963–64
4	Roger Davis	303	1972–73
5	Brayon Blake	298	2017–18
6	Kyle Barone	291	2012–13
7	Tom Moreland	289	1964–65
8	Pete Prigge	287	1983–84
9	Harry Harrison	283	1994–95
10	Deon Watson	282	1993–94

Single game
Rank	Player	Rebounds	Season	Opponent
1	Tom Moreland	31	1963–64	Whitworth
	Gus Johnson	31	1962–63	Oregon
3	Gus Johnson	28	1962–63	Gonzaga
4	Bob Pipkin	26	1965–66	Idaho State
	Gus Johnson	26	1962–63	Montana
6	Gus Johnson	25	1962–63	Oregon
	Gus Johnson	25	1962–63	Idaho State
8	Gus Johnson	24	1962–63	Seattle U
9	Gus Johnson	22	1962–63	Idaho State
10	Gus Johnson	22	1962–63	Washington State
	Gus Johnson	22	1962–63	Gonzaga

== Assists ==
Career
Rank	Player	Assists	Seasons
1	Brian Kellerman	390	1979–80 1980–81 1981–82 1982–83
2	Mac Hopson	349	2008–09 2009–10
3	Bill Hessing	312	1976–77 1977–78 1978–79
4	Tanoris Shepard	300	2002–03 2003–04 2004–05 2005–06
5	Victor Sanders	287	2014–15 2015–16 2016–17 2017–18
6	Don Newman	281	1978–79 1979–80
7	Justin Logan	274	1999–00 2000–01 2001–02 2002–03
8	Otis Livingston	262	1989–90
9	Kenny Luckett	257	1984–85 1985–86 1986–87 1987–88
	Ricky Wilson	257	1991–92 1992–93

Season
Rank	Player	Assists	Season
1	Otis Livingston	262	1989–90
2	Mac Hopson	194	2008–09
3	Ricky Wilson	176	1992–93
4	Larenzo Nash	163	1988–89
5	Mike Scott	160	2014–15
6	Mac Hopson	155	2009–10
	Landon Tatum	155	2011–12
	Divant'e Moffitt	155	2022–23
9	Don Newman	149	1979–80
10	Bill Hessing	145	1977–78

Single game
Rank	Player	Assists	Season	Opponent
1	Otis Livingston	16	1989–90	Montana State
2	Ken Owens	15	1981–82	Iowa State
3	Jordan Brooks	14	2007–08	Hawaii
4	Otis Livingston	13	1989–90	EWU
5	Don Newman	12	1978–79	Roosevelt
6	Mac Hopson	11	2009–10	Hawaii
	Mac Hopson	11	2009–10	Seattle U
	Ricky Wilson	11	1992–93	Central Washington
	Larenzo Nash	11	1988–89	Idaho State

== Steals ==
Career
Rank	Player	Steals	Seasons
1	Brian Kellerman	208	1979–80 1980–81 1981–82 1982–83
2	James Fitch	135	1986–87 1987–88 1988–89
3	Victor Sanders	130	2014–15 2015–16 2016–17 2017–18
4	Phil Hopson	127	1979–80 1980–81 1981–82 1982–83
5	Don Newman	117	1978–79 1979–80
6	Ken Owens	101	1980–81 1981–82
7	Gordon Scott	98	1998–99 1999–00
8	Avery Curry	93	1997–98 1998–99
9	Trevon Allen	91	2016–17 2017–18 2018–19 2019–20
10	Tom Stalick	90	1983–84 1984–85 1985–86 1986–87
	Dandrick Jones	90	2003–04 2004–05

Season
Rank	Player	Steals	Season
1	Don Newman	64	1978–79
2	Brian Kellerman	60	1979–80
3	James Fitch	59	1987–88
	Calvin Ward	59	1990–91
5	Ken Owens	56	1981–82
6	Mac Hopson	55	2008–09
	Gordon Scott	55	1999–00
	Dandrick Jones	55	2004–05
	Victor Sanders	55	2016–17
10	Brian Kellerman	54	1981–82

Single game
Rank	Player	Steals	Season	Opponent
1	Trevon Allen	7	2019–20	Eastern Washington
	Victor Sanders	7	2016–17	Washington State
	Derrick Elliott	7	1996–97	Idaho State
	James Fitch	7	1988–89	Portland
	Brian Kellerman	7	1981–82	Western Montana
	Phil Hopson	7	1980–81	Wisconsin-Oshkosh

== Blocks ==
Career
Rank	Player	Blocks	Seasons
1	Kelvin Smith	133	1981–82 1982–83
2	Deon Watson	131	1990–91 1991–92 1992–93 1993–94
3	Marvin Jefferson	122	2008–09 2009–10
	Kyle Barone	122	2009–10 2010–11 2011–12 2012–13
5	Frank Waters	88	1991–92 1992–93 1993–94
6	Darin Nagle	81	2006–07 2007–08
	Julius Mims	81	2023–24 2024–25
8	Raymond Brown	79	1987–88 1988–89
9	Phil Hopson	69	1979–80 1980–81 1981–82 1982–83
10	Ron Maben	68	1979–80 1980–81

Season
Rank	Player	Blocks	Season
1	Kelvin Smith	72	1982–83
2	Marvin Jefferson	64	2009–10
3	Kelvin Smith	61	1981–82
4	Marvin Jefferson	58	2008–09
5	Kyle Barone	50	2011–12
6	Julius Mims	48	2023–24
7	Djim Bandoumel	47	2011–12
8	Frank Waters	45	1991–92
	Deon Watson	45	1991–92
10	Raymond Brown	43	1987–88

Single game
Rank	Player	Blocks	Season	Opponent
1	Gus Johnson	10	1962–63	Gonzaga
2	Kelvin Smith	8	1982–83	UC Irvine
3	Frank Waters	7	1991–92	Nevada
	Kelvin Smith	7	1982–83	Midwestern State
5	Isaac Jones	6	2022–23	North Dakota
	Djim Bandoumel	6	2011–12	New Mexico State
	Marvin Jefferson	6	2009–10	Boise State
	Darin Nagle	6	2006–07	New Mexico State
	Frank Waters	6	1991–92	Montana
	Ron Maben	6	1980–81	Northern Arizona
