= 2017–18 Idaho Vandals men's basketball team =

American college basketball season

2017–18 Idaho Vandals men's basketball
- Conference: Big Sky Conference
- Record: 22–9 (14–4 Big Sky)
- Head coach: Don Verlin (10th season)
- Assistant coaches: Tim Murphy; Kirk Earlywine; Zac Claus
- Home arena: Cowan Spectrum, Memorial Gym

2017–18 Big Sky men's basketball standings
	Conf.				Overall
Team	W		L	PCT	W		L	PCT
Montana †	16	–	2	.889	26	–	8	.765
Idaho	14	–	4	.778	22	–	9	.710
Weber State	13	–	5	.722	20	–	11	.645
Eastern Washington	13	–	5	.722	20	–	15	.571
Northern Colorado	11	–	7	.611	26	–	12	.684
Idaho State	9	–	9	.500	14	–	16	.467
Portland State	9	–	9	.500	20	–	14	.588
Montana State	6	–	12	.333	13	–	19	.406
North Dakota	6	–	12	.333	12	–	20	.375
Southern Utah	5	–	13	.278	13	–	19	.406
Sacramento State	4	–	14	.222	7	–	25	.219
Northern Arizona	2	–	16	.111	5	–	27	.156
† Conference tournament winner

The 2017–18 Idaho Vandals men's basketball team represented the University of Idaho during the 2017–18 NCAA Division I men's basketball season. The Vandals, led by tenth-year head coach Don Verlin, played their home games at the Cowan Spectrum, with a few early season games at Memorial Gym, in Moscow, Idaho as members of the Big Sky Conference. They finished the season 22–9, 14–4 in Big Sky play to finish in second place. They lost in the quarterfinals of the Big Sky tournament to Southern Utah.

== Previous season ==
The Vandals finished the 2016–17 season 19–14, 12–6 in Big Sky play to finish in a tie for third place. Big Sky tournament. They defeated Montana in the quarterfinals of the Big Sky tournament before losing in the semifinals to North Dakota. They were invited to the CollegeInsider.com Tournament where they defeated Stephen F. Austin before losing in the second round to Texas State.

== Offseason ==
=== Departures ===
Name	Number	Pos.	Height	Weight	Year	Hometown	Reason for departure
Nick Blair	0	F	6'5"	205	Sophomore	Las Vegas, NV	Transferred to UNLV
Myles Franklin	2	G	6'0"	171	RS Freshman	Castaic, CA	Transferred to Allan Hancock College
Jake Straughan	5	G	6'1"	175	RS Sophomore	Colton, WA	Graduate transferred to Fresno Pacific
Pat Ingram	13	G	6'2"	201	Senior	Indianapolis, IN	Graduated
Tyler Brimhall	24	G	6'4"	185	RS Freshman	Logan, UT	Transferred to North Idaho College
George Nahshon	25	G	6'2"	165	Senior	Clarkston, WA	Graduated
Ty Egbert	41	F	6'9"	195	Senior	Coulee Dam, WA	Graduated

=== 2017 recruiting class ===
College recruiting information
Name	Hometown	School	Height	Weight	Commit date
Scott Blakney; PF	Prosser, WA	Prosser High School	6 ft 9 in (2.06 m)	225 lb (102 kg)	Sep 6, 2016
Scott Blakney; PF	Recruit ratings: Scout: Rivals: (NR)				
Jared Rodriguez; SF	Glendale, AZ	Mountain Ridge High School	6 ft 8 in (2.03 m)	N/A	Oct 19, 2016
Jared Rodriguez; SF	Recruit ratings: Scout: Rivals: (NR)				
Losini Kamara; SG	Brooklyn Park, MN	Park Center High School	6 ft 3 in (1.91 m)	160 lb (73 kg)	Oct 19, 2016
Losini Kamara; SG	Recruit ratings: Scout: Rivals: (NR)				
Geno West; SG	Portland, OR	Jefferson High School	6 ft 2 in (1.88 m)	165 lb (75 kg)	Mar 14, 2017
Geno West; SG	Recruit ratings: Scout: Rivals: (NR)				
Garrett Kingman; SG	Gig Harbor, WA	Peninsula High School	6 ft 6 in (1.98 m)	N/A	Mar 14, 2017
Garrett Kingman; SG	Recruit ratings: Scout: Rivals: (NR)				
Cassius Smits-Francisco; PF	Netherlands	Cactus Shadows High School	6 ft 9 in (2.06 m)	N/A	Apr 27, 2017
Cassius Smits-Francisco; PF	Recruit ratings: Scout: Rivals: (NR)				
Overall recruit ranking:
Note: In many cases, Scout, Rivals, 247Sports, On3, and ESPN may conflict in their listings of height and weight.; In these cases, the average was taken. ESPN grades are on a 100-point scale.; Sources: "2017 Team Ranking". Rivals.

== Preseason ==
In separate preseason polls of league coaches and media, the Vandals were picked to win the Big Sky championship. Senior guard Victor Sanders was named to the preseason All-Big Sky team.

== Roster ==
2017–18 Idaho Vandals men's basketball team
Players
Coaches

Pos.	#	Name	Height	Weight	Year	Previous school	Hometown
G	1	Perrion Callandret	6 ft 2 in (1.88 m)	180 lb (82 kg)	RS Sr	Bothell HS	Bothell, WA
G	3	Losini Kamara	6 ft 3 in (1.91 m)	180 lb (82 kg)	Fr	Park Center HS	Brooklyn Park, MN
F	4	Brayon Blake	6 ft 7 in (2.01 m)	215 lb (98 kg)	Sr	Garfield HS; College of Southern Idaho	Seattle, WA
G	11	Victor Sanders	6 ft 5 in (1.96 m)	190 lb (86 kg)	Sr	Jefferson HS	Portland, OR
G/F	12	Chance Garvin	6 ft 4 in (1.93 m)	180 lb (82 kg)	Fr	Lake Roosevelt HS	Coulee Dam, WA
G	13	Geno West	6 ft 2 in (1.88 m)	160 lb (73 kg)	Fr	Jefferson HS	Portland, OR
G	14	Chad Sherwood (W)	6 ft 2 in (1.88 m)	185 lb (84 kg)	Sr	West Albany HS	Albany, OR
F	20	Jared Rodriguez	6 ft 8 in (2.03 m)	180 lb (82 kg)	Fr	Mountain Ridge HS	Glendale, AZ
F	21	Arkadiy Mkrtuchyan	6 ft 7 in (2.01 m)	225 lb (102 kg)	Sr	Columbia Christian HS	Portland, OR
G/F	22	Garrett Kingman	6 ft 6 in (1.98 m)	205 lb (93 kg)	Fr	Peninsula HS/Elite Prep	Gig Harbor, WA
F	23	Nate Sherwood	6 ft 8 in (2.03 m)	210 lb (95 kg)	RS Jr	West Albany HS	Albany, OR
G	25	Trevon Allen	6 ft 2 in (1.88 m)	180 lb (82 kg)	So	Clarkston HS	Lapwai, ID
F/C	31	Cassius Smits-Francisco	6 ft 9 in (2.06 m)	230 lb (104 kg)	Fr	Cactus Shadows HS	Cave Creek, AZ
F	34	Scott Blakney	6 ft 9 in (2.06 m)	225 lb (102 kg)	Fr	Prosser HS	Prosser, WA
F	44	Jordan Scott	6 ft 6 in (1.98 m)	200 lb (91 kg)	Sr	Lewis-Palmer HS	Colorado Springs, CO

Head coach

- Don Verlin (Colorado State)

Assistant coach(es)

- Tim Murphy (Colorado State)
- Kirk Earlywine (Campbell)
- Zac Claus (Eastern Washington)

Legend

- (C) Team captain
- (S) Suspended
- (I) Ineligible
- (W) Walk-on
- Injured
- Current redshirt

Roster

== Schedule and results ==
Date time, TV	Rank^{#}	Opponent^{#}	Result	Record	Site (attendance) city, state
Exhibition
Oct 28, 2017*; 11:00 am		at Oregon; Charity Exhibition for Oregon Wildfire Fund	L 57–81		Matthew Knight Arena; Eugene, OR
Nov 5, 2017*; 4:00 pm		Lewis–Clark State	W 84–59		Memorial Gym (909); Moscow, ID
Non-conference regular season
Nov 10, 2017*; 7:00 pm		at Nevada	L 64–88	0–1	Lawlor Events Center (8,457); Reno, NV
Nov 13, 2017*; 7:00 pm		George Fox	W 101–62	1–1	Memorial Gym (687); Moscow, ID
Nov 18, 2017*; 7:00 pm		Sam Houston State	W 63–54	2–1	Memorial Gym (1,187); Moscow, ID
Nov 22, 2017*; 6:30 pm		vs. Santa Clara; Great Alaska Shootout quarterfinals	W 69–59	3–1	Alaska Airlines Center (2,303); Anchorage, AK
Nov 22, 2017*; 9:00 pm		vs. Cal State Bakersfield; Great Alaska Shootout semifinals	L 62–64	3–2	Alaska Airlines Center (3,082); Anchorage, AK
Nov 24, 2017*; 6:30 pm		vs. Cal Poly; Great Alaska Shootout 3rd place game	W 75–66	4–2	Alaska Airlines Arena (3,460); Anchorage, AK
Dec 3, 2017*; 7:00 pm		at Nicholls State	W 79–68	5–2	Stopher Gym (253); Thibodaux, LA
Dec 6, 2017*; 7:00 pm, SWX		Washington State; Battle of the Palouse	W 91–64	6–2	Cowan Spectrum (4,329); Moscow, ID
Dec 9, 2017*; 7:00 pm		at Cal State Bakersfield	L 55–66	6–3	Icardo Center (2,633); Bakersfield, CA
Dec 15, 2017*; 7:00 pm		Simon Fraser	L 54–73	7–3	Cowan Spectrum (719); Moscow, ID
Dec 18, 2017*; 7:00 pm, ESPN3		at Western Michigan	W 83–52	8–3	University Arena (1,645); Kalamazoo, MI
Dec 21, 2017*; 6:30 pm, Pluto TV		vs. UC Irvine; Boise Showcase	L 59–67	8–4	CenturyLink Arena (4,096); Boise, ID
Big Sky regular season
Dec 29, 2017; 5:00 pm, Pluto TV		at North Dakota	W 74–57	9–4 (1–0)	Betty Engelstad Sioux Center (1,597); Grand Forks, ND
Dec 31, 2017; 1:00 pm, Pluto TV		at Northern Colorado	L 77–81	9–5 (1–1)	Bank of Colorado Arena (960); Greeley, CO
Jan 4, 2018; 7:00 pm, Pluto TV		Sacramento State	W 69–68	10–5 (2–1)	Cowan Spectrum (1,829); Moscow, ID
Jan 6, 2018; 7:00 pm, ELVN		Portland State	L 72–73	10–6 (2–2)	Cowan Spectrum (1,012); Moscow, ID
Jan 12, 2018; 7:30 pm, Pluto TV		at Eastern Washington	W 58–51	11–6 (3–2)	Reese Court (2,334); Cheney, WA
Jan 18, 2018; 5:30 pm, Pluto TV		at Southern Utah	W 80–76	12–6 (4–2)	America First Events Center (3,578); Cedar City, UT
Jan 20, 2018; 4:00 pm, Pluto TV		at Northern Arizona	W 84–80	13–6 (5–2)	Walkup Skydome (832); Flagstaff, AZ
Jan 25, 2018; 7:00 pm, Pluto TV		Northern Colorado	L 63–80	13–7 (5–3)	Cowan Spectrum (1,122); Moscow, ID
Jan 27, 2018; 7:00 pm, Pluto TV		North Dakota	W 96–71	14–7 (6–3)	Cowan Spectrum (1,818); Moscow, ID
Feb 1, 2018; 7:00 pm, Pluto TV		at Portland State	W 97–88	15–7 (7–3)	Pamplin Sports Center (710); Portland, OR
Feb 3, 2018; 7:05 pm, Pluto TV		at Sacramento State	W 81–58	16–7 (8–3)	Hornets Nest (675); Sacramento, CA
Feb 9, 2018; 7:30 pm, Pluto TV		Eastern Washington	W 66–64	17–7 (9–3)	Cowan Spectrum (3,192); Moscow, ID
Feb 15, 2018; 7:00 pm, Pluto TV		Montana State	W 88–78	18–7 (10–3)	Cowan Spectrum (1,019); Moscow, ID
Feb 17, 2018; 7:00 pm, Pluto TV		Montana	W 79–77 ^{OT}	19–7 (11–3)	Cowan Spectrum (1,839); Moscow, ID
Feb 22, 2018; 6:00 pm, Pluto TV		at Idaho State	L 83–86	19–8 (11–4)	Reed Gym (1,976); Pocatello, ID
Feb 24, 2018; 6:00 pm, ELVN		at Weber State	W 68–62	20–8 (12–4)	Dee Events Center (7,513); Ogden, UT
Mar 1, 2018; 7:00 pm, Pluto TV		Northern Arizona	W 66–52	21–8 (13–4)	Cowan Spectrum (1,269); Moscow, ID
Mar 3, 2018; 7:00 pm, Pluto TV		Southern Utah	W 78–76	22–8 (14–4)	Cowan Spectrum (3,219); Moscow, ID
Big Sky tournament
Mar 8, 2018; 5:30 pm, ELVN	(2)	vs. (10) Southern Utah	L 78–92	22–9	Reno Events Center (1,078); Reno, NV
*Non-conference game. ^{#}Rankings from AP Poll. (#) Tournament seedings in parentheses. All times are in Pacific Time.
