= 2016–17 Idaho Vandals men's basketball team =

American college basketball season

2016–17 Idaho Vandals men's basketball

CIT, Second Round
- Conference: Big Sky Conference
- Record: 19–14 (12–6 Big Sky)
- Head coach: Don Verlin (9th season)
- Assistant coaches: Tim Murphy; Kirk Earlywine; Zac Claus
- Home arena: Cowan Spectrum, Memorial Gym

2016–17 Big Sky men's basketball standings
	Conf.				Overall
Team	W		L	PCT	W		L	PCT
North Dakota †	14	–	4	.778	22	–	10	.688
Eastern Washington	13	–	5	.722	22	–	12	.647
Idaho	12	–	6	.667	19	–	14	.576
Weber State	12	–	6	.667	20	–	14	.588
Montana	11	–	7	.611	16	–	16	.500
Montana State	11	–	7	.611	16	–	16	.500
Sacramento State	9	–	9	.500	13	–	18	.419
Portland State	7	–	11	.389	15	–	16	.484
Northern Colorado*	7	–	11	.389	11	–	18	.379
Northern Arizona	6	–	12	.333	9	–	23	.281
Southern Utah	3	–	15	.167	6	–	27	.182
Idaho State	3	–	15	.167	5	–	26	.161
† Conference tournament winner

The 2016–17 Idaho Vandals men's basketball team represented the University of Idaho during the 2016–17 NCAA Division I men's basketball season. The Vandals, led by ninth-year head coach Don Verlin, played their home games at the Cowan Spectrum, with a few early season games at Memorial Gym, in Moscow, Idaho and were members of the Big Sky Conference. They finished the regular season 19–14, 12–6 in Big Sky play to finish in a tie for third place. Big Sky tournament. They defeated Montana in the quarterfinals of the Big Sky tournament before losing in the semifinals to North Dakota. They were invited to the CollegeInsider.com Tournament where they defeated Stephen F. Austin before losing in the second round to Texas State.

== Previous season ==
The Vandals finished the 2015–16 season 21–13, 12–6 record in Big Sky play to finish in third place. They defeated Eastern Washington in the quarterfinals of the Big Sky tournament to advance to the semifinals where they lost to Montana. They were invited to the College Basketball Invitational where they lost in the first round to Seattle.

== Offseason ==
=== Departures ===
Name	Number	Pos.	Height	Weight	Year	Hometown	Notes
Chris Sarbaugh	10	G	6'4"	201	Senior	Spokane, WA	Graduated
Paulin Mpawe	15	F	6'10"	227	Senior	San Bernardino, CA	Graduated
George Nahshon	24	F	6'9"	200	Senior	Kapolei, HI	Graduated
Skyler White	33	G	6'6"	238	RS Sophomore	Bellevue, WA	Transferred to Point Loma Nazarene

=== Incoming transfers ===
Name	Number	Pos.	Height	Weight	Year	Hometown	Previous School
Brayon Blake	4	F	6'7"	200	Junior	Seattle, WA	Junior college transferred from College of Southern Idaho.

=== 2016 incoming recruits ===
College recruiting information
Name	Hometown	School	Height	Weight	Commit date
Tre'von Allen; SF	Clarkston, WA	Clarkston High School	6 ft 2 in (1.88 m)	165 lb (75 kg)	Sep 15, 2015
Tre'von Allen; SF	Recruit ratings: Scout: Rivals: (NR)				
Overall recruit ranking:
Note: In many cases, Scout, Rivals, 247Sports, On3, and ESPN may conflict in their listings of height and weight.; In these cases, the average was taken. ESPN grades are on a 100-point scale.; Sources: "2016 Team Ranking". Rivals.

== Roster ==
2016–17 Idaho Vandals men's basketball team
Players
Coaches

Pos.	#	Name	Height	Weight	Year	Previous school	Hometown
F	0	Nick Blair	6 ft 5 in (1.96 m)	205 lb (93 kg)	So	Bishop Gorman HS	Las Vegas, NV
G	1	Perrion Callandret	6 ft 2 in (1.88 m)	180 lb (82 kg)	Sr	Bothell HS	Bothell, WA
G	2	Myles Franklin	6 ft 0 in (1.83 m)	171 lb (78 kg)	RS Fr	Hart HS	Castaic, CA
F	4	Brayon Blake	6 ft 7 in (2.01 m)	200 lb (91 kg)	Jr	Garfield HS; College of Southern Idaho	Seattle, WA
G	5	Jake Straughan	6 ft 1 in (1.85 m)	175 lb (79 kg)	RS So	Colton HS	Colton, WA
G	11	Victor Sanders	6 ft 5 in (1.96 m)	195 lb (88 kg)	Jr	Jefferson HS	Portland, OR
G	13	Pat Ingram	6 ft 2 in (1.88 m)	201 lb (91 kg)	Sr	North Central HS; Trinity Valley CC	Indianapolis, IN
G	14	Chad Sherwood (W)	6 ft 2 in (1.88 m)	180 lb (82 kg)	Jr	West Albany HS	Albany, OR
F	21	Arkadiy Mkrtuchyan	6 ft 7 in (2.01 m)	224 lb (102 kg)	Jr	Columbia Christian HS	Portland, OR
F	23	Nate Sherwood	6 ft 8 in (2.03 m)	206 lb (93 kg)	RS So	West Albany HS	Albany, OR
G	24	Tyler Brimhall	6 ft 4 in (1.93 m)	185 lb (84 kg)	RS Fr	Logan HS	Logan, UT
G	25	Trevon Allen	6 ft 2 in (1.88 m)	180 lb (82 kg)	Fr	Clarkston HS	Lapwai, ID
F	41	Ty Egbert	6 ft 9 in (2.06 m)	195 lb (88 kg)	Sr	Lake Roosevelt HS	Coulee Dam, WA
F	44	Jordan Scott	6 ft 6 in (1.98 m)	200 lb (91 kg)	Jr	Lewis-Palmer HS	Colorado Springs, CO

Head coach

- Don Verlin (Colorado State)

Assistant coach(es)

- Tim Murphy (Colorado State)
- Kirk Earlywine (Campbell)
- Zac Claus (Eastern Washington)

Legend

- (C) Team captain
- (S) Suspended
- (I) Ineligible
- (W) Walk-on
- Injured
- Current redshirt

Roster

== Schedule and results ==
Date time, TV	Rank^{#}	Opponent^{#}	Result	Record	Site (attendance) city, state
Chinese exhibition tour
6/14/2016*; 6:00 am		vs. Lithuania national team 2016 International Basketball Atlas Challenge, Group B	W 71–69		Dushu Lake Arena; Suzhou, China
6/15/2016*; 6:00 am		vs. Iran national team 2016 International Basketball Atlas Challenge, Group B	L 62–71		Dushu Lake Arena; Suzhou, China
6/16/2016*		vs. Macedonia national team 2016 International Basketball Atlas Challenge, Group B	L 67–79		Dushu Lake Arena; Suzhou, China
6/18/2016*		vs. Japan national team 2016 International Basketball Atlas Challenge, Losers' Bracket	W 74–64		Dushu Lake Arena; Suzhou, China
6/22/2016*		vs. Macedonia national team 2016 International Basketball Atlas Challenge, 5th Place Match	L 79–85		Dushu Lake Arena; Suzhou, China
6/23/2016*		vs. China national team	L 94–102 ^{OT}		Dushu Lake Arena; Suzhou, China
Exhibition
10/25/2016*; 7:00 pm		Carroll (MT)	W 80–62		Memorial Gym (745); Moscow, ID
11/04/2016*; 7:00 pm		Lewis–Clark State	W 80–66		Memorial Gym (763); Moscow, ID
Non-conference regular season
11/12/2016*; 8:00 pm		Corban	W 90–67	1–0	Memorial Gym (628); Moscow, ID
11/16/2016*; 6:00 pm		at Northern Illinois	L 49–63	1–1	Convocation Center (1,430); DeKalb, IL
11/18/2016*; 4:30 pm		at Little Rock	W 65–57	2–1	Jack Stephens Center (2,630); Little Rock, AR
11/21/2016*; 7:00 pm		South Dakota State	W 96–86 ^{OT}	3–1	Memorial Gym (474); Moscow, ID
11/25/2016*; 4:30 pm		at Sam Houston State	L 62–69	3–2	Bernard Johnson Coliseum (625); Huntsville, TX
11/29/2016*; 7:00 pm		San Jose State	L 49–58	3–3	Memorial Gym (674); Moscow, ID
12/03/2016*; 7:00 pm		UC Davis	W 68–66	4–3	Memorial Gym; Moscow, ID
12/07/2016*; 7:00 pm, P12N		at Washington State; Battle of the Palouse	L 48–61	4–4	Beasley Coliseum (3,178); Pullman, WA
12/10/2016*; 5:00 pm		at South Dakota State	L 77–80	4–5	Frost Arena (1,349); Brookings, SD
12/17/2016*; 5:00 pm		Northwest Nazarene	W 87–61	5–5	Cowan Spectrum (826); Moscow, ID
12/22/2016*; 7:30 pm, P12N		at Stanford	L 80–86	5–6	Maples Pavilion (3,287); Stanford, CA
Big Sky regular season
12/31/2016; 7:00 pm		Eastern Washington	L 62–69	5–7 (0–1)	Cowan Spectrum (1,107); Moscow, ID
01/05/2017; 7:00 pm		Montana	L 57–70	5–8 (0–2)	Cowan Spectrum (813); Moscow, ID
01/07/2017; 7:00 pm		Montana State	W 83–81 ^{OT}	6–8 (1–2)	Cowan Spectrum (1,114); Moscow, ID
01/12/2017; 6:00 pm		at Weber State	L 66–91	6–9 (1–3)	Dee Events Center (6,507); Ogden, UT
01/14/2017; 6:00 pm		at Idaho State	W 77–62	7–9 (2–3)	Holt Arena (1,754); Pocatello, ID
01/19/2017; 7:00 pm		Southern Utah	W 79–67	8–9 (3–3)	Cowan Spectrum (889); Moscow, ID
01/21/2017; 7:00 pm		Northern Arizona	W 65–49	9–9 (4–3)	Cowan Spectrum (1,323); Moscow, ID
01/26/2017; 6:00 pm		at Montana State	L 91–94	9–10 (4–4)	Brick Breeden Fieldhouse (2,620); Bozeman, MT
01/28/2017; 6:00 pm		at Montana	W 85–77 ^{OT}	10–10 (5–4)	Dahlberg Arena (3,935); Missoula, MT
02/02/2017; 7:00 pm		Portland State	W 89–72	11–10 (6–4)	Cowan Spectrum (1,014); Moscow, ID
02/04/2017; 7:00 pm		Sacramento State	W 71–67	12–10 (7–4)	Cowan Spectrum (1,629); Moscow, ID
02/09/2017; 6:00 pm		at Northern Colorado	W 88–76	13–10 (8–4)	Bank of Colorado Arena (1,059); Greeley, CO
02/11/2017; 2:00 pm		at North Dakota	L 65–88	13–11 (8–5)	Betty Engelstad Sioux Center (2,345); Grand Forks, ND
02/18/2017; 6:00 pm		at Eastern Washington	L 67–77	13–12 (8–6)	Reese Court (2,821); Cheney, WA
02/23/2017; 7:00 pm		Idaho State	W 69–61	14–12 (9–6)	Cowan Spectrum; Moscow, ID
02/25/2017; 7:00 pm		Weber State	W 83–78 ^{OT}	15–12 (10–6)	Cowan Spectrum (1,043); Moscow, ID
03/02/2017; 7:30 pm		at Northern Arizona	W 77–75	16–12 (11–6)	Walkup Skydome (1,426); Flagstaff, AZ
03/04/2017; 3:00 pm		at Southern Utah	W 84–75	17–12 (12–6)	Centrum Arena (2,010); Cedar City, UT
Big Sky tournament
03/09/2017; 12:05 pm	(4)	at (5) Montana; Quarterfinals	W 81–77	18–12	Reno Events Center (1,762); Reno, NV
03/10/2017; 5:35 pm	(4)	at (1) North Dakota; Semifinals	L 64–69	18–13	Reno Events Center (2,003); Reno, NV
CIT
03/15/2017*; 8:00 pm, Facebook Live		Stephen F. Austin; First Round	W 73–50	19–13	Memorial Gym (1,109); Moscow, ID
03/22/2017*; 6:00 pm, Facebook Live		at Texas State; Second Round	L 55–64	19–14	Strahan Coliseum (3,086); San Marcos, TX
*Non-conference game. ^{#}Rankings from AP Poll. (#) Tournament seedings in parentheses. All times are in Pacific Time.
