= Gordon Scott (disambiguation) =

Gordon Scott (1926–2007) was an American film and television actor.

Gordon Scott may also refer to:

- Gordon Scott (basketball) (born 1976), American basketball player
- Gordon Scott (politician) (1908–1965), Australian politician
- Gordon Wallace Scott (1887–1940), Canadian politician

== See also ==
- Scott Gordon (disambiguation)
