= 2021–22 Reyer Venezia season =

Italian basketball season

Reyer Venezia
2020-21 season
- Owner: Luigi Brugnaro
- President: Federico Casarin
- Head coach: Walter De Raffaele
- Arena: Palasport Giuseppe Taliercio
- LBA: Regular season
- EuroCup Basketball: Regular season
- Supercup: Semifinals

The 2020–21 season is Reyer Venezia's 150th in existence and the club's 12th consecutive season in the top tier Italian basketball.

== Kit ==
Supplier: Erreà / Sponsor: Umana

== Players ==
=== Current roster ===
Umana Reyer Venezia roster
Players
Coaches

Pos.	No.	Nat.	Name	Ht.	Wt.	Age
G	5	(United States)	Stone, Julyan	1.98 m (6 ft 6 in)	95 kg (209 lb)	37 – 7 December 1988
G/F	6	(Greece)	Bramos, Michael (C)	1.98 m (6 ft 6 in)	102 kg (225 lb)	39 – 27 May 1987
SG	7	(Italy)	Tonut, Stefano	1.94 m (6 ft 4 in)	100 kg (220 lb)	32 – 7 November 1993
PF	9	(United States)	Daye, Austin	2.07 m (6 ft 9 in)	91 kg (201 lb)	38 – 5 June 1988
PG	10	(Italy)	De Nicolao, Andrea	1.85 m (6 ft 1 in)	75 kg (165 lb)	35 – 21 August 1991
F/C	14	(Lithuania)	Echodas, Martynas	2.06 m (6 ft 9 in)	110 kg (243 lb)	29 – 7 July 1997
F/C	19	(Slovenia)	Morgan, Jordan	2.03 m (6 ft 8 in)	112 kg (247 lb)	35 – 15 September 1991
PF	22	(Italy)	Mazzola, Valerio	2.05 m (6 ft 9 in)	107 kg (236 lb)	38 – 7 March 1988
PF	23	(Italy)	Brooks, Jeff	2.03 m (6 ft 8 in)	100 kg (220 lb)	37 – 12 June 1989
PG	25	(North Macedonia)	Theodore, Jordan	1.83 m (6 ft 0 in)	89 kg (196 lb)	36 – 11 December 1989
G/F	30	(Argentina)	Cerella, Bruno	1.94 m (6 ft 4 in)	93 kg (205 lb)	40 – 30 July 1986
SG	31	(Italy)	Vitali, Michele	1.96 m (6 ft 5 in)	88 kg (194 lb)	34 – 31 October 1991
C	50	(United States)	Watt, Mitchell	2.08 m (6 ft 10 in)	106 kg (234 lb)	36 – 14 December 1989

Head coach

- (Italy) Walter De Raffaele

Assistant coach(es)

- (Italy) Gianluca Tucci
- (Italy) Alberto Billio
- (Italy) Simone Bianchi

Legend

- (C) Team captain
- Injured

- Roster
Updated: January 31, 2022

Note: Flags indicate national team eligibility at FIBA-sanctioned events. Players may hold other non-FIBA nationalities not displayed.

=== Depth chart ===
Pos.	Starting 5	Bench 1	Bench 2
C	Jordan Morgan	Mitchell Watt	Martynas Echodas
PF	Jeff Brooks	Austin Daye	Valerio Mazzola
SF	Michael Bramos
SG	Stefano Tonut	Michele Vitali	Bruno Cerella
PG	Jordan Theodore	Andrea De Nicolao	Julyan Stone

(colours: Italian or homegrown players; foreign players; young players)

=== Squad changes ===
==== In ====
No.	Pos.	Nat.	Name	Age	Moving from		Type	Ends	Transfer fee	Date	Source
31	SG	(Italy)	Michele Vitali	29	Brose Bamberg	(Germany)			Free	24 June 2021	
14	F/C	(Lithuania)	Martynas Echodas	23	Rytas Vilnius	(Lithuania)			Free	29 June 2021	
23	PF	(Italy) (United States)	Jeff Brooks	32	Olimpia Milano	(Italy)			Free	1 July 2021	
11	SG	(United States)	Victor Sanders	26	Aquila Trento	(Italy)	1 year	June 2022	Free	15 July 2021	
12	SG	(United Kingdom) (United States)	Tarik Phillip	27	Tofaş Bursa	(Italy)			Free	18 July 2021	
15	SF	(Greece)	Vassilis Charalampopoulos	24	Ionikos Nikaias	(Greece)			Free	1 August 2021	
19	PF/C	(Slovenia) (United States)	Jordan Morgan	30	UNICS Kazan	(Russia)	End of the season	June 2022	Free	16 January 2022	
25	PG	(North Macedonia)	Jordan Theodore	32	Free agent				Free	18 January 2022	

1. In players: Players that signed after the beginning of the season

==== Out ====
No.	Pos.	Nat.	Name	Age	Moving to		Type	Transfer fee	Date	Source
12	SG	(Italy)	Luca Campogrande	25	Pallacanestro Trieste	(Italy)	End of contract	Free	26 June 2021	
42	PF	(New Zealand)	Isaac Fotu	33	Utsunomiya Brex	(Japan)	End of contract	Free	28 June 2021	
14	C	(Slovenia)	Gašper Vidmar	33	Free agent		End of contract	Free	1 July 2021	
55	PG	(United States)	Curtis Jerrells	34	Zamalek	(Egypt)	End of contract	Free	1 July 2021	
21	SG	(United States)	Jeremy Chappell	34	New Basket Brindisi	(Italy)	End of contract	Free	1 July 2021	
15	G	(United States)	Wes Clark	26	New Basket Brindisi	(Italy)	End of contract	Free	1 July 2021	
3	SG	(Italy)	Davide Casarin	18	Universo Treviso Basket	(Italy)	2 years loan	Undisclosed	2 July 2021	
33	C	(Italy)	Luca Possamai	20	San Giobbe Basket	(Italy)	Loan contract	Undisclosed	7 August 2021	
15	SF	(Greece)	Vassilis Charalampopoulos	24	Fortitudo Bologna	(Italy)	Transfer	Undisclosed	1 December 2021	
12	SG	(United Kingdom)	Tarik Phillip	28	San Pablo Burgos	(Spain)	Transfer	Undisclosed	31 January 2022	
11	SG	(United States)	Victor Sanders	27	Free agent		Mutual Agreement	Free	20 April 2022	

1. Out players: Players who left before the end of the season

==== Confirmed ====
No.	Pos.	Nat.	Name	Age	Moving from		Type	Ends	Transfer fee	Date	Source
7	SG	(Italy)	Stefano Tonut	26	Pallacanestro Trieste	(Italy)	2 + 5 years	June 2023	Free	1 July 2015	
6	SF	(Greece) (United States)	Michael Bramos	33	Panathinaikos	(Greece)	6 years	June 2021	Free	28 August 2015	
10	PG	(Italy)	Andrea De Nicolao	28	Reggio Emilia	(Italy)	3 + 2+1 years	June 2022 + 2023	Free	13 July 2017	
50	C	(United States)	Mitchell Watt	30	Shabab Al Ahli Dubai	(United Arab Emirates)	3 + 3 years	June 2023	Free	18 July 2017	
30	G/F	(Argentina) (Italy)	Bruno Cerella	33	Olimpia Milano	(Italy)	3 + 1years	June 2021	Free	22 August 2017	
9	PF	(United States)	Austin Daye	32	Hapoel Jerusalem	(Israel)	3 + 2+1 years	June 2022 + 2023	Free	29 January 2018	
5	PG	(United States)	Julyan Stone	32	Charlotte Hornets	(United States)	3 + 1 years	June 2022	Free	15 July 2018	
22	PF	(Italy)	Valerio Mazzola	32	Auxilium Torino	(Italy)	2 + 2 years	June 2022	Free	18 July 2018	

==== Coach ====
Nat.	Name	Age.	Last team		Type	Ends	Date	Source
(Italy)	Walter De Raffaele	51	Reyer Venezia (assistant)	(Italy)	2 + 3 years	June 2021	12 March 2016	

=== On loan ===
Pos.	Nat.	Name	Age	Moving from		Moving to		Date	Source
SG	(Italy)	Davide Casarin	17	Reyer Venezia	(Italy)	Universo Treviso Basket	(Italy)	2 July 2021	
SG	(Italy)	Federico Miaschi	20	Pallacanestro Biella	(Italy)	Treviglio	(Italy)	20 July 2021	
SG	(Italy)	Leonardo Biancotto	18	Jesolo	(Italy)	San Giobbe Basket	(Italy)	5 August 2021	
C	(Italy)	Luca Possamai	20	Reyer Venezia	(Italy)	San Giobbe Basket	(Italy)	7 August 2021	

== Competitions ==
=== Supercup ===
==== Group stage ====
Pos	Team	Pld	W	L	PF	PA	PD	Qualification
1	Umana Reyer Venezia	4	4	0	329	281	+48	Advance to Final Eight
2	UnaHotels Reggio Emilia	4	2	2	302	284	+18	
3	Fortitudo Bologna	4	0	4	270	336	−66	

Source: LegaBasket Serie A
Rules for classification: All points scored in extra period(s) were not counted in the standings, nor for any tie-break situation.

==== Playoffs ====
18 September 2021 Quarterfinals	Carpegna Prosciutto Pesaro	51–83	Umana Reyer Venezia	Casalecchio di Reno, Bologna
12:00 (CEST)	Scoring by quarter: 11–20, 3–25, 22–23, 15–15
Discovery+, Eurosport, DMAX	Pts: Drell 9 Rebs: Camara 11; Asts: Sanford 8 PIR: Camara 19	Boxscore	Pts: Sanders 20; Rebs: Phillip 7 Asts: De Nicolao 6 PIR: Sanders 24	Arena: Unipol Arena; Referees: Carmelo Lo Guzzo, Michele Rossi, Denny Borgioni

20 September 2021 Semifinals	Umana Reyer Venezia	71–72	Virtus Segafredo Bologna	Casalecchio di Reno, Bologna
21:00 (CEST)	Scoring by quarter: 11–20, 20–14, 16–16, 24–22
Discovery+, Eurosport, DMAX	Pts: Tonut 16; Rebs: Tonut 9 Asts: Tonut, De Nicolao 4 PIR: Tonut 21	Boxscore	Pts: Hervey 17; Rebs: Hervey 9 Asts: Teodosić 8 PIR: Teodosić 21	Arena: Unipol Arena; Referees: Roberto Begnis, Mark Bartoli, Valerio Grigioni

=== Serie A ===
Pos	Team	Pld	W	L	PF	PA	PD	Pts	Qualification
3	Germani Basket Brescia	30	21	9	2524	2310	+214	42	Qualification to Playoffs
4	Bertram Derthona Basket	30	17	13	2418	2412	+6	34	Qualification to Playoffs
5	Umana Reyer Venezia	30	17	13	2331	2297	+34	34	Qualification to Playoffs
6	Banco di Sardegna Sassari	30	17	13	2541	2449	+92	34	Qualification to Playoffs
7	UNAHOTELS Reggio Emilia	30	15	15	2409	2401	+8	30	Qualification to Playoffs

Source: LBA
