= Scott Gordon =

Scott Gordon may refer to:

- Scott Gordon (ice hockey) (born 1963), American ice hockey coach and former goaltender
- Scott Gordon (Canadian football) (born 1977), former Canadian football safety
- Scott Gordon (golfer) (born 1981), American golfer
- Scott Gordon (soccer) (born 1988), American soccer player
- Scott A. Gordon (born 1967), former president of Stephen F. Austin State University
- H. Scott Gordon (1924–2019), Canadian economist

== See also ==
- Gordon Scott (disambiguation)

.
