= 1991–92 Boise State Broncos men's basketball team =

American college basketball season

1991–92 Boise State Broncos men's basketball
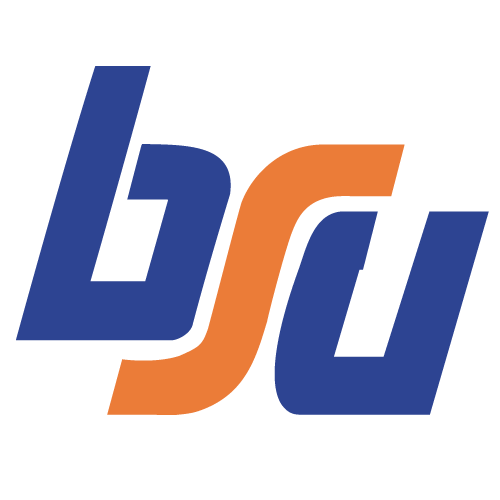
- Conference: Big Sky Conference
- Record: 16–13 (7–9 Big Sky)
- Head coach: Bobby Dye (9th season)
- Assistant coach: Rod Jensen
- Home arena: BSU Pavilion

1991–92 Big Sky men's basketball standings
	Conf.				Overall
Team	W		L	PCT	W		L	PCT
Montana †	14	–	2	.875	27	–	4	.871
Nevada	13	–	3	.813	19	–	10	.655
Weber State	10	–	6	.625	16	–	13	.552
Idaho	10	–	6	.625	18	–	14	.563
Boise State	7	–	9	.438	16	–	13	.552
Idaho State	6	–	10	.375	9	–	21	.300
Montana State	6	–	10	.375	14	–	14	.500
Northern Arizona	3	–	13	.188	7	–	20	.259
Eastern Washington	3	–	13	.188	6	–	21	.222
† Conference tournament winner

The 1991–92 Boise State Broncos men's basketball team represented Boise State University during the 1991–92 NCAA Division I men's basketball season. The Broncos were led by ninth-year head coach Bobby Dye and played their home games on campus at the BSU Pavilion in Boise, Idaho.

They finished the regular season at 16–12 overall, with a 7–9 record in the Big Sky Conference, fifth in the standings.

At the conference tournament in Missoula, Montana, the fifth-seeded Broncos lost to fourth seed Idaho by nineteen points in the quarterfinal round.

== Postseason results ==
Date time, TV	Rank^{#}	Opponent^{#}	Result	Record	Site (attendance) city, state
Big Sky tournament
Thu, March 12; 9:00 pm	(5)	vs. (4) Idaho; Quarterfinal	L 56–75	16–13	Dahlberg Arena (5,628); Missoula, Montana
*Non-conference game. ^{#}Rankings from AP poll. (#) Tournament seedings in parentheses. All times are in Mountain time.
