= 1999–2000 Utah State Aggies men's basketball team =

American college basketball season

1999–2000 Utah State Aggies men's basketball
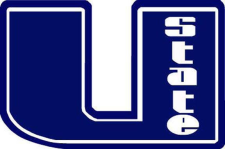

Big West tournament champions Big West Regular Season Champions

NCAA tournament, first round
- Conference: Big West Conference
- East
- Record: 28–6 (16–0 Big West)
- Head coach: Stew Morrill (2nd season)
- Assistant coach: Randy Rahe (2nd season)
- Home arena: Smith Spectrum

1999–2000 Big West men's basketball standings
	Conf.				Overall
Team	W		L	PCT	W		L	PCT
East Division
Utah State†	16	–	0	1.000	28	–	6	.824
New Mexico State	11	–	5	.688	22	–	10	.688
Nevada	6	–	10	.375	9	–	20	.310
Idaho	6	–	10	.375	12	–	17	.414
Boise State	6	–	10	.375	12	–	15	.444
North Texas	5	–	11	.313	7	–	20	.259
West Division
Long Beach State	15	–	1	.938	24	–	6	.800
UC Santa Barbara	10	–	6	.625	14	–	14	.500
UC Irvine	7	–	9	.438	14	–	14	.500
Pacific	6	–	10	.375	11	–	18	.379
Cal Poly	5	–	11	.313	10	–	18	.357
Cal State Fullerton	3	–	13	.188	8	–	19	.296
† 2000 Big West tournament winner As of April 10, 2000; Rankings from AP poll

The 1999–2000 Utah State Aggies men's basketball team represented Utah State University in the 1999–2000 college basketball season. This was head coach Stew Morrill's 2nd season at Utah State. The Aggies played their home games at the Dee Glen Smith Spectrum and were members of the Big West Conference. They finished the season 28–6, 16–0 to capture the regular season championship. They also won the Big West tournament to earn an automatic bid to the 2000 NCAA Division I men's basketball tournament as No. 12 seed in the South Region. Entering play on a 19-game winning streak, the Aggies lost to No. 5 seed and AP #20 Connecticut in the first round.

== Roster ==
1999–2000 Utah State Aggies men's basketball team
Players
Coaches

Pos.	#	Name	Height	Weight	Year	Hometown
F	5	Shawn Daniels	6 ft 6 in (1.98 m)	235 lb (107 kg)	Jr	Bakersfield, California
G	22	Troy Rolle	6 ft 2 in (1.88 m)	—	Sr
G	31	Tony Brown	6 ft 3 in (1.91 m)	—	So

Head coach

- Stew Morrill

Assistant coach(es)

Legend

- (C) Team captain
- (S) Suspended
- (I) Ineligible
- (W) Walk-on
- Injured
- Current redshirt

Roster

== Schedule and results ==
Date time, TV	Rank^{#}	Opponent^{#}	Result	Record	Site (attendance) city, state
Non-conference regular season
Nov 13, 1999*		Simon Fraser	W 78–57	1–0	Dee Glen Smith Spectrum (5,928); Logan, Utah
Nov 22, 1999*		vs. No. 6 Florida; Maui Invitational tournament	L 58–60	1–1	Lahaina Civic Center (2,400); Lahaina, Hawaii
Nov 23, 1999*		at Chaminade; Maui Invitational Tournament	W 70–48	2–1	Lahaina Civic Center (2,400); Lahaina, Hawaii
Nov 24, 1999*		vs. USC; Maui Invitational Tournament	W 52–50	3–1	Lahaina Civic Center (2,400); Lahaina, Hawaii
Nov 30, 1999*		at Northern Arizona	L 52–64	3–2	J.C. Rolle Activity Center (946); Flagstaff, Arizona
Dec 4, 1999*		UC San Diego	W 82–58	4–2	Dee Glen Smith Spectrum (6,464); Logan, Utah
Dec 7, 1999*		at Utah	L 42–77	4–3	Jon M. Huntsman Center (12,759); Salt Lake City, Utah
Dec 9, 1999*		Northern Arizona	W 80–58	5–3	Dee Glen Smith Spectrum (5,249); Logan, Utah
Dec 18, 1999*		Western Colorado	W 93–51	6–3	Dee Glen Smith Spectrum (4,302); Logan, Utah
Dec 21, 1999*		at Weber State	L 73–86	6–4	Dee Events Center (7,658); Ogden, Utah
Dec 28, 1999*		Mercer	W 74–55	7–4	Dee Glen Smith Spectrum (6,214); Logan, Utah
Dec 29, 1999*		San Diego	W 68–65 ^{OT}	8–4	Dee Glen Smith Spectrum (6,409); Logan, Utah
Jan 4, 2000*		Fresno State	W 83–66	9–4	Dee Glen Smith Spectrum (5,619); Logan, Utah
Jan 8, 2000*		BYU	L 73–82	9–5	Dee Glen Smith Spectrum (10,270); Logan, Utah
Big West Regular Season
Jan 13, 2000		Cal State Fullerton	W 82–70	10–5 (1–0)	Dee Glen Smith Spectrum (5,644); Logan, Utah
Jan 15, 2000		UC Irvine	W 81–46	11–5 (2–0)	Dee Glen Smith Spectrum (6,383); Logan, Utah
Jan 20, 2000		at UC Santa Barbara	W 61–57	12–5 (3–0)	The Thunderdome (1,050); Santa Barbara, California
Jan 22, 2000		at Cal Poly	W 74–62	13–5 (4–0)	Robert A. Mott Athletics Center (3,032); San Luis Obispo, California
Jan 27, 2000		at Boise State	W 75–68	14–5 (5–0)	BSU Pavilion (8,774); Boise, Idaho
Jan 30, 2000		at Idaho	W 67–60	15–5 (6–0)	Cowan Spectrum (2,191); Moscow, Idaho
Feb 3, 2000*		North Texas	W 83–70	16–5 (7–0)	Dee Glen Smith Spectrum (5,933); Logan, Utah
Feb 5, 2000		New Mexico State	W 66–51	17–5 (8–0)	Dee Glen Smith Spectrum (9,264); Logan, Utah
Feb 10, 2000		Nevada	W 69–54	18–5 (9–0)	Dee Glen Smith Spectrum (6,456); Logan, Utah
Feb 12, 2000		at Long Beach State	W 71–63	19–5 (10–0)	The Walter Pyramid (4,805); Long Beach, California
Feb 17, 2000		at Nevada	W 62–53	20–5 (11–0)	Lawlor Events Center (5,893); Reno, Nevada
Feb 19, 2000		Pacific Tigers	W 64–55	21–5 (12–0)	Dee Glen Smith Spectrum (7,162); Logan, Utah
Feb 24, 2000		at New Mexico State	W 70–66	22–5 (13–0)	Pan American Center (7,245); Las Cruces, New Mexico
Feb 26, 2000		at North Texas	W 76–68	23–5 (14–0)	The Super Pit (2,762); Denton, Texas
Mar 2, 2000		Idaho	W 73–52	24–5 (15–0)	Dee Glen Smith Spectrum (8,859); Logan, Utah
Mar 4, 2000		Boise State	W 74–62	25–5 (16–0)	Dee Glen Smith Spectrum (10,270); Logan, Utah
Big West tournament
Mar 9, 2000*		vs. Pacific; Quarterfinals	W 64–41	26–5	Lawlor Events Center (5,189); Reno, Nevada
Mar 10, 2000*		at Nevada; Semifinals	W 69–64	27–5	Lawlor Events Center (5,753); Reno, Nevada
Mar 11, 2000*		vs. New Mexico State; Championship game	W 71–66	28–5	Lawlor Events Center (3,159); Reno, Nevada
NCAA tournament
Mar 17, 2000*	(12 S)	vs. (5 S) No. 20 Connecticut; First Round	L 67–75	28–6	Birmingham-Jefferson Civic Center (11,061); Birmingham, Alabama
*Non-conference game. ^{#}Rankings from AP poll. (#) Tournament seedings in parentheses. S=South. All times are in Mountain.
