= 1992 Big Sky Conference men's basketball tournament =

- Classification: Division I
- Season: 1991–92
- Teams: 6
- Site: Dahlberg Arena; Missoula, Montana
- Champions: Montana (2nd title)
- Winning coach: Blaine Taylor (1st title)
- MVP: Delvon Anderson (Montana)

1991–92 Big Sky men's basketball standings
	Conf.				Overall
Team	W		L	PCT	W		L	PCT
Montana †	14	–	2	.875	27	–	4	.871
Nevada	13	–	3	.813	19	–	10	.655
Weber State	10	–	6	.625	16	–	13	.552
Idaho	10	–	6	.625	18	–	14	.563
Boise State	7	–	9	.438	16	–	13	.552
Idaho State	6	–	10	.375	9	–	21	.300
Montana State	6	–	10	.375	14	–	14	.500
Northern Arizona	3	–	13	.188	7	–	20	.259
Eastern Washington	3	–	13	.188	6	–	21	.222
† Conference tournament winner

The 1992 Big Sky Conference men's basketball tournament was the seventeenth edition, held March 12–14 at Dahlberg Arena at the University of Montana in Missoula, Montana.

Top-seeded Montana repeated as conference champions by defeating Nevada in the championship game, 73–68, to win their second Big Sky tournament title. Both of Montana's opponents in the tournament had defeated them earlier in the season.

It was Nevada's thirteenth and final year in the Big Sky; they departed for the Big West in the summer.

== Format ==
Total conference membership remained at nine and the tournament format was unchanged.

The top six teams from the regular season were included and the regular season champion earned the right to host. The top two earned byes into the semifinals while the remaining four played in the quarterfinals; the top seed (host) met the lowest remaining seed in the semifinals.

== Bracket ==
Quarterfinals; Thursday, March 12
4	Idaho	75
5	Boise State	56
3	Weber State	92
6	Idaho State	74

Semifinals; Friday, March 13
1	Montana	69
4	Idaho	52
2	Nevada	92
3	Weber State	83

Championship; Saturday, March 14
1	Montana	73
2	Nevada	68

== NCAA tournament ==
The Grizzlies (27–3) received an automatic bid to the NCAA tournament, and no other Big Sky members were invited to the tournament or the NIT. Montana received three votes in the final AP poll, and was seeded fourteenth in the West regional; they lost by ten points in the first round to Florida State in Boise. It was the tenth consecutive year in which the Big Sky representative lost in the first round.

== See also ==
- Big Sky Conference women's basketball tournament
