= 1999–2000 UC Irvine Anteaters men's basketball team =

American college basketball season

1999–00 UC Irvine Anteaters men's basketball
- Conference: Big West Conference
- Record: 14–14 (7–9 Big West)
- Head coach: Pat Douglass (3rd season)
- Home arena: Bren Events Center

1999–2000 Big West men's basketball standings
	Conf.				Overall
Team	W		L	PCT	W		L	PCT
East Division
Utah State†	16	–	0	1.000	28	–	6	.824
New Mexico State	11	–	5	.688	22	–	10	.688
Nevada	6	–	10	.375	9	–	20	.310
Idaho	6	–	10	.375	12	–	17	.414
Boise State	6	–	10	.375	12	–	15	.444
North Texas	5	–	11	.313	7	–	20	.259
West Division
Long Beach State	15	–	1	.938	24	–	6	.800
UC Santa Barbara	10	–	6	.625	14	–	14	.500
UC Irvine	7	–	9	.438	14	–	14	.500
Pacific	6	–	10	.375	11	–	18	.379
Cal Poly	5	–	11	.313	10	–	18	.357
Cal State Fullerton	3	–	13	.188	8	–	19	.296
† 2000 Big West tournament winner As of April 10, 2000; Rankings from AP poll

The 1999–00 UC Irvine Anteaters men's basketball team represented the University of California, Irvine during the 1999–00 NCAA Division I men's basketball season. The Anteaters were led by 3rd year head coach Pat Douglass and played at the Bren Events Center and were members of the Big West Conference.

== Previous season ==
The 1998–99 UC Irvine Anteaters men's basketball team finished the season with a record of 6–20 and 2–14 in Big West play. Freshman guard Jerry Green won the conference freshman of the year award.

== Roster ==
1999–2000 UC Irvine Anteaters men's basketball team
Players
Coaches

Pos.	#	Name	Height	Weight	Year	Hometown
G	14	Zamiro Bennem	6 ft 4 in (1.93 m)	195 lb (88 kg)	So
C	4	J.R. Christ	6 ft 9 in (2.06 m)	238 lb (108 kg)	So
G	11	Malachi Edmond	6 ft 1 in (1.85 m)	185 lb (84 kg)	Jr
F	3	Greg Ethington	6 ft 8 in (2.03 m)	235 lb (107 kg)	Fr
C	52	Mark Gottschalk	6 ft 10 in (2.08 m)	255 lb (116 kg)	So
G	5	Jerry Green	6 ft 3 in (1.91 m)	195 lb (88 kg)	So	Pomona, CA
G	24	Sean Jackson	6 ft 5 in (1.96 m)	125 lb (57 kg)	Jr
F	30	Jens Jensen	6 ft 5 in (1.96 m)	185 lb (84 kg)	Jr
F	45	Ben Jones	6 ft 7 in (2.01 m)	220 lb (100 kg)	Jr
F	40	Matt Okoro	6 ft 7 in (2.01 m)	210 lb (95 kg)	Fr
F	21	Marek Ondera	6 ft 7 in (2.01 m)	220 lb (100 kg)	Sr
F	42	Adam Stetson	6 ft 7 in (2.01 m)	230 lb (104 kg)	Sr

Head coach

Pat Douglass (Pacific)

Assistant coach(es)

Legend

- (C) Team captain
- (S) Suspended
- (I) Ineligible
- (W) Walk-on
- Injured
- Current redshirt

Roster

== Schedule ==
Date time, TV	Rank^{#}	Opponent^{#}	Result	Record	Site (attendance) city, state
Non-Conference Season
November 19, 1999*		San Diego	L 62–75	0–1	Bren Events Center (1,261); Irvine, CA
November 26, 1999*		vs. Southwest Texas; Sooner Holiday Classic	W 69–46	1–1	Lloyd Noble Center (2,000); Norman, OK
November 27, 1999*		at Oklahoma; Sooner Holiday Classic	L 68–80	1–2	Lloyd Noble Center (10,481); Norman, OK
December 1, 1999*		at Loyola Marymount	W 69–59	2–2	Gersten Pavilion (553); Los Angeles, CA
December 4, 1999*		Saint Mary's	W 67–59	3–2	Bren Events Center (2,658); Irvine, CA
December 14, 1999*		Western Washington	W 86–55	4–2	Bren Events Center (716); Irvine, CA
December 18, 1999		at California	L 61–88	4–3	Haas Pavilion (10,319); Berkeley, CA
December 22, 1999*		Humboldt State	W 89–55	5–3	Bren Events Center (956); Irvine, CA
December 30, 1999*		St. Francis	W 67–57	6–3	Bren Events Center (908); Irvine, CA
January 5, 2000		at BYU	L 66–77	6–4	Marriott Center (9,574); Provo, UT
January 9, 2000*		High Point	W 74–69	7–4	Bren Events Center (659); Irvine, CA
Conference Season
January 13, 2000		at Nevada	L 63–67	7–5 (0–1)	Lawlor Events Center (5,202); Reno, NV
January 15, 2000		at Utah State	L 46–81	7–6 (0–2)	Smith Spectrum (6,383); Logan, UT
January 20, 2000		Idaho	W 71–67	8–6 (1–2)	Bren Events Center (1,684); Irvine, CA
January 22, 2000		Boise State	L 52–53	8–7 (1–3)	Bren Events Center (3,156); Irvine, CA
January 26, 2000		Cal State Fullerton	L 64–76	8–8 (1–4)	Bren Events Center (1,661); Irvine, CA
January 29, 2000		at New Mexico State	L 59–66	8–9 (1–5)	Pan American Center (7,120); Las Cruces, NM
February 3, 2000		Long Beach State	L 60–69	8–10 (1–6)	Bren Events Center (2,317); Irvine, CA
February 5, 2000		Pacific	W 59–53	9–10 (2–6)	Bren Events Center (2,442); Irvine, CA
February 10, 2000		at Cal Poly	W 90–67	10–10 (3–6)	Mott Gym (2,364); San Luis Obispo, CA
February 12, 2000		at UC Santa Barbara	L 40–55	10–11 (3–7)	UC Santa Barbara Events Center (2,268); Santa Barbara, CA
February 17, 2000		Cal Poly	L 75–89	10–12 (3–8)	Bren Events Center (1,006); Irvine, CA
February 19, 2000		UC Santa Barbara	W 61–58	11–12 (4–8)	Bren Events Center (1,397); Irvine, CA
February 24, 2000		Pacific	W 62–55	12–12 (5–8)	Alex G. Spanos Center (3,014); Stockton, CA
February 26, 2000		at Long Beach State	L 65–82	12–13 (5–9)	The Pyramid (4,126); Long Beach, CA
March 1, 2000		at Cal State Fullerton	W 88–71	13–13 (6–9)	Titan Gym (812); Fullerton, CA
March 4, 2000		North Texas	W 93–84	14–13 (7–9)	Bren Events Center (1,930); Irvine, CA
Big West Conference tournament
March 9, 2000		New Mexico State; Quarterfinals	L 51–70	14–14	Lawlor Event Center (1,721); Reno, NV
*Non-conference game. ^{#}Rankings from AP Poll. (#) Tournament seedings in parentheses. All times are in Pacific Time.

== Awards and honors ==
- Jerry Green
  - All-Big West Second Team
- Greg Ethington
  - Big West All-Freshman Team
