= 1991–92 Montana Grizzlies basketball team =

American college basketball season

1991–92 Montana Grizzlies basketball

Big Sky champions

NCAA tournament, First Round
- Conference: Big Sky Conference
- Record: 27–4 (14–2 Big Sky)
- Head coach: Blaine Taylor (1st season)
- Home arena: Adams Fieldhouse

1991–92 Big Sky men's basketball standings
	Conf.				Overall
Team	W		L	PCT	W		L	PCT
Montana †	14	–	2	.875	27	–	4	.871
Nevada	13	–	3	.813	19	–	10	.655
Weber State	10	–	6	.625	16	–	13	.552
Idaho	10	–	6	.625	18	–	14	.563
Boise State	7	–	9	.438	16	–	13	.552
Idaho State	6	–	10	.375	9	–	21	.300
Montana State	6	–	10	.375	14	–	14	.500
Northern Arizona	3	–	13	.188	7	–	20	.259
Eastern Washington	3	–	13	.188	6	–	21	.222
† Conference tournament winner

The 1991–92 Montana Grizzlies basketball team represented the University of Montana during the 1991–92 NCAA Division I basketball season. The Grizzlies were led by former assistant coach and first-year head coach Blaine Taylor and played their home games on campus at Adams Fieldhouse in Missoula, Montana.

They finished the regular season at 25–3, with a 14–2 record in conference to win the regular season title. The Grizzlies earned an automatic berth in the NCAA tournament by winning the Big Sky Conference tournament.

In the opening round of the NCAA Tournament at BSU Pavilion in Boise, Idaho, Montana faced the No. 3 seed Florida State. The Grizzlies were beaten in a competitive game, 78–68.

== Postseason results ==
Date time, TV	Rank^{#}	Opponent^{#}	Result	Record	Site (attendance) city, state
Regular season
Nov, 1991*		Simon Fraser	W 87–58	1–0	Harry Adams Field House; Missoula, Montana
Nov 22, 1991*		Oregon	W 78–39	2–0	Harry Adams Field House; Missoula, Montana
Nov 26, 1991*		at San Jose State	W 72–51	3–0	Event Center Arena; San Jose, California
Nov 29, 1991*		Southeastern Louisiana; Montana Holiday Tournament	W 89–47	4–0	Harry Adams Field House; Missoula, Montana
Nov 30, 1991*		Texas-Arlington; Montana Holiday Tournament	W 73–68	5–0	Harry Adams Field House; Missoula, Montana
Dec 4, 1991*		Portland	W 98–68	6–0	Harry Adams Field House; Missoula, Montana
Dec 7, 1991*		at Cal State Northridge	W 67–48	7–0	Matador Gymnasium; Northridge, California
Dec 14, 1991*		at Pepperdine	W 89–88 ^{3OT}	8–0	Firestone Fieldhouse; Malibu, California
Dec 16, 1991*		at Southern Utah	L 65–74	8–1	America First Event Center; Cedar City, Utah
Dec 20, 1991*		Washington	W 60–55	9–1	Harry Adams Field House; Missoula, Montana
Dec 21, 1991*		Coastal Carolina	W 74–52	10–1	Harry Adams Field House; Missoula, Montana
Dec, 1991*		Lewis–Clark State	W 85–65	11–1	Harry Adams Field House; Missoula, Montana
Jan 2, 1992*		Weber State	W 62–60	12–1 (1–0)	Harry Adams Field House; Missoula, Montana
Jan 4, 1992*		Idaho State	W 87–74	13–1 (2–0)	Harry Adams Field House; Missoula, Montana
Jan 11, 1992*		at Eastern Washington	W 71–65	14–1 (3–0)	Reese Court; Cheney, Washington
Jan 18, 1992*		Montana State	W 73–59	15–1 (4–0)	Harry Adams Field House; Missoula, Montana
Jan 23, 1992*		Idaho	W 73–58	16–1 (5–0)	Harry Adams Field House; Missoula, Montana
Jan 24, 1992*		Boise State	W 67–53	17–1 (6–0)	Harry Adams Field House; Missoula, Montana
Jan 30, 1992*		at Northern Arizona	W 74–59	18–1 (7–0)	Walkup Skydome; Flagstaff, Arizona
Feb 1, 1992*		at Nevada	L 67–89	18–2 (7–1)	Lawlor Events Center; Reno, Nevada
Feb 6, 1992*		at Idaho State	W 84–75	19–2 (8–1)	Holt Arena; Pocatello, Idaho
Feb 8, 1992*		at Weber State	W 77–73	20–2 (9–1)	Dee Events Center; Ogden, Utah
Feb 13, 1992*		Eastern Washington	W 91–66	21–2 (10–1)	Harry Adams Field House; Missoula, Montana
Feb 22, 1992*		at Montana State	W 77–72	22–2 (11–1)	Brick Breeden Fieldhouse; Bozeman, Montana
Feb 27, 1992*		at Boise State	W 71–58	23–2 (12–1)	BSU Pavilion; Boise, Idaho
Feb 29, 1992*		at Idaho	L 63–73	23–3 (12–2)	Kibbie Dome; Moscow, Idaho
Mar 5, 1992*		Nevada	W 103–86	24–3 (13–2)	Harry Adams Field House; Missoula, Montana
Mar 7, 1992*		Northern Arizona	W 90–59	25–3 (14–2)	Harry Adams Field House; Missoula, Montana
Big Sky tournament
Mar 13, 1992*; 9:00 p.m.	(1)	(4) Idaho; Semifinals	W 69–52	26–3	Harry Adams Field House (7,103); Missoula, Montana
Mar 14, 1992*	(1)	(2) Nevada; Championship Game	W 73–68	27–3	Harry Adams Field House; Missoula, Montana
NCAA tournament
Mar 19, 1992*	(14 W)	vs. (3 W) No. 20 Florida State; First Round	L 68–78	27–4	BSU Pavilion; Boise, Idaho
*Non-conference game. ^{#}Rankings from AP Poll. (#) Tournament seedings in parentheses. W=West. All times are in Mountain time.
