= 2000 Big West Conference men's basketball tournament =

- Classification: Division I
- Season: 1999–00
- Teams: 8
- Site: Lawlor Events Center; Reno, NV
- Champions: Utah State (3rd title)
- Winning coach: Stew Morrill (1st title)
- MVP: Shawn Daniels and Troy Rolle (Utah State)

1999–2000 Big West men's basketball standings
	Conf.				Overall
Team	W		L	PCT	W		L	PCT
East Division
Utah State†	16	–	0	1.000	28	–	6	.824
New Mexico State	11	–	5	.688	22	–	10	.688
Nevada	6	–	10	.375	9	–	20	.310
Idaho	6	–	10	.375	12	–	17	.414
Boise State	6	–	10	.375	12	–	15	.444
North Texas	5	–	11	.313	7	–	20	.259
West Division
Long Beach State	15	–	1	.938	24	–	6	.800
UC Santa Barbara	10	–	6	.625	14	–	14	.500
UC Irvine	7	–	9	.438	14	–	14	.500
Pacific	6	–	10	.375	11	–	18	.379
Cal Poly	5	–	11	.313	10	–	18	.357
Cal State Fullerton	3	–	13	.188	8	–	19	.296
† 2000 Big West tournament winner As of April 10, 2000; Rankings from AP poll

The 2000 Big West Conference men's basketball tournament was held March 9–11 at Lawlor Events Center in Reno, Nevada.

Utah State defeated New Mexico State in the championship game, 71–66, to obtain the second Big West Conference men's basketball tournament championship in school history.

The Aggies participated in the 2000 NCAA Division I men's basketball tournament after earning the conference's automatic bid.

== Format ==
Eight of the 12 teams in the conference participated, with Boise State, Cal Poly, Cal State Fullerton, and North Texas not qualifying. The top eight teams were seeded based on regular season conference records.

== Bracket ==
Quarterfinals; Friday, March 9
E1	Utah State	64
W4	Pacific	41
E3	Nevada	85
W2	UC Santa Barbara	78
W3	UC Irvine	51
E2	New Mexico State	70
E4	Idaho	86
W1	Long Beach State	97

Semifinals; Saturday, March 10
E1	Utah State	69
E3	Nevada	64
E2	New Mexico State	89*
W1	Long Beach State	84

Championship; Sunday, March 11
E1	Utah State	71
E2	New Mexico State	66
