= 1991–92 Idaho Vandals men's basketball team =

American college basketball season

1991–92 Idaho Vandals men's basketball
- Conference: Big Sky Conference
- Record: 18–14 (10–6 Big Sky)
- Head coach: Larry Eustachy (2nd season)
- Assistant coaches: Hugh Watson; Steve Barnes (4th season)
- Home arena: Kibbie Dome

1991–92 Big Sky men's basketball standings
	Conf.				Overall
Team	W		L	PCT	W		L	PCT
Montana †	14	–	2	.875	27	–	4	.871
Nevada	13	–	3	.813	19	–	10	.655
Weber State	10	–	6	.625	16	–	13	.552
Idaho	10	–	6	.625	18	–	14	.563
Boise State	7	–	9	.438	16	–	13	.552
Idaho State	6	–	10	.375	9	–	21	.300
Montana State	6	–	10	.375	14	–	14	.500
Northern Arizona	3	–	13	.188	7	–	20	.259
Eastern Washington	3	–	13	.188	6	–	21	.222
† Conference tournament winner

The 1991–92 Idaho Vandals men's basketball team represented the University of Idaho during the 1991–92 NCAA Division I men's basketball season. Members of the Big Sky Conference, the Vandals were led by second-year head coach Larry Eustachy and played their home games on campus at the Kibbie Dome in Moscow, Idaho.

The Vandals were 17–13 overall in the regular season and 10–6 in conference play, tied for third place in the league standings. At the conference tournament in Missoula, the Vandals defeated Boise State by nineteen points in the opening round, but lost to host Montana by seventeen in the semifinals.

== Postseason results ==
Date time, TV	Rank^{#}	Opponent^{#}	Result	Record	Site (attendance) city, state
Big Sky tournament
Thu, March 12; 8:00 pm	(4)	vs. (5) Boise State; Quarterfinal	W 75–56	18–13	Dahlberg Arena (5,628); Missoula, Montana
Fri, March 13; 8:00 pm	(4)	at (1) Montana; Semifinal	L 52–69	18–14	Dahlberg Arena (7,103); Missoula, Montana
*Non-conference game. (#) Tournament seedings in parentheses. All times are in Pacific time.
