= Raymond Brown (basketball) =

American basketball player (born 1965)

Personal information
- Born: July 5, 1965 Atlanta, Georgia, U. S.
- Listed height: 6 ft 8 in (2.03 m)
- Listed weight: 220 lb (100 kg)

Career information
- High school: Sylvan (Atlanta, Georgia)
- College: Mississippi State (1984–1986); Idaho (1987–1989)
- NBA draft: 1989: undrafted
- Playing career: 1989–2002
- Position: Small forward
- Number: 24

Career history
- 1989: Utah Jazz
- 1989–1990: Rapid City Thrillers
- 1990–1991: OAR Ferrol
- 1991–1993: Elosúa León
- 1993–1995: Cáceres CB
- 1995: Limoges
- 1996: Joventut Badalona
- 1996–1997: Baloncesto Fuenlabrada
- 1998–1999: Sicc Jesi
- 1999–2000: Fabriano Basket
- 2000–2001: Mabo Livorno
- 2002: Atenas de Córdoba

Career highlights
- CBA All-Rookie Team
- Stats at NBA.com
- Stats at Basketball Reference

Raymond Brown (born July 5, 1965) is an American former basketball player who played briefly in the National Basketball Association (NBA), among other leagues. He played college basketball for the Mississippi State Bulldogs and Idaho Vandals.

He played for the Utah Jazz during the 1989–90 NBA season for 16 games.

Brown played for the Rapid City Thrillers of the Continental Basketball Association (CBA) during the 1989–90 season and was named to the CBA All-Rookie Team.
