= Red Morrison =

American basketball player (1932–2023)

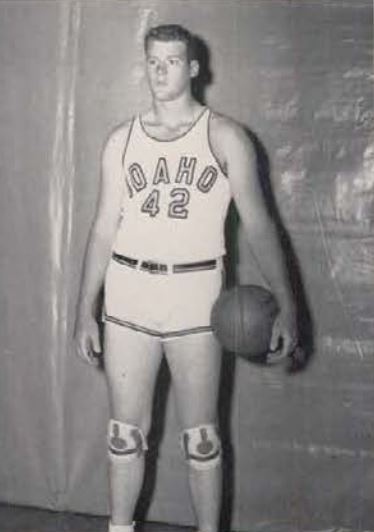
- Morrison as a senior at Idaho

Personal information
- Born: April 26, 1932 Fresno, California, U.S.
- Died: June 7, 2023 (aged 91) Mesa, Arizona, U.S.
- Listed height: 6 ft 8 in (2.03 m)
- Listed weight: 220 lb (100 kg)

Career information
- High school: Walla Walla (Walla Walla, Washington)
- College: Idaho (1951–1954)
- NBA draft: 1954: 2nd round, 14th overall pick
- Drafted by: Boston Celtics
- Playing career: 1954–1959
- Position: Center
- Number: 15, 12

Career history
- 1954–1956: Boston Celtics
- 1957: St. Louis Hawks
- 1958–1959: Baltimore Bullets

Career NBA statistics
- Points: 555 (3.6 ppg)
- Rebounds: 822 (5.3 rpg)
- Assists: 135 (0.9 apg)
- Stats at NBA.com
- Stats at Basketball Reference

Dwight Willard "Red" Morrison (April 26, 1932 – June 7, 2023) was an American professional basketball player and FBI agent.

== Biography ==
A 6'8" center from the University of Idaho, Morrison played in the National Basketball Association from 1954 to 1958 as a member of the Boston Celtics and St. Louis Hawks. He averaged 3.6 points and 5.3 rebounds in 155 career games.

Morrison was a Special Agent of the Federal Bureau of Investigation from 1963 to 1985, having served in the El Paso, Los Angeles, and Seattle Divisions during his career.

Morrison was a resident of Mesa, Arizona. He died there on June 7, 2023, at the age of 91.

== Career statistics ==
Legend
GP	Games played	GS	Games started	MPG	Minutes per game
FG%	Field goal percentage	3P%	3-point field goal percentage	FT%	Free throw percentage
RPG	Rebounds per game	APG	Assists per game	SPG	Steals per game
BPG	Blocks per game	PPG	Points per game	**Bold**	Career high

=== NBA ===
==== Regular season ====
Year	Team	GP	MPG	FG%	FT%	RPG	APG	PPG
1954–55	Boston	**71**	**17.3**	**.423**	.626	**6.4**	**1.2**	**4.4**
1955–56	Boston	**71**	12.8	.371	.494	4.9	.7	3.1
1957–58	St. Louis	13	6.1	.346	**.750**	2.0	.0	1.6
Career		155	14.3	.396	.572	5.3	.9	3.6

==== Playoffs ====
Year	Team	GP	MPG	FG%	FT%	RPG	APG	PPG
1955	Boston	**7**	6.0	**.375**	**.333**	2.0	**.1**	1.0
1956	Boston	3	**7.7**	.286	.000	**3.7**	.0	**1.3**
Career		10	6.5	.333	.143	2.5	.1	1.1
