= Kyle Barone =

American basketball player

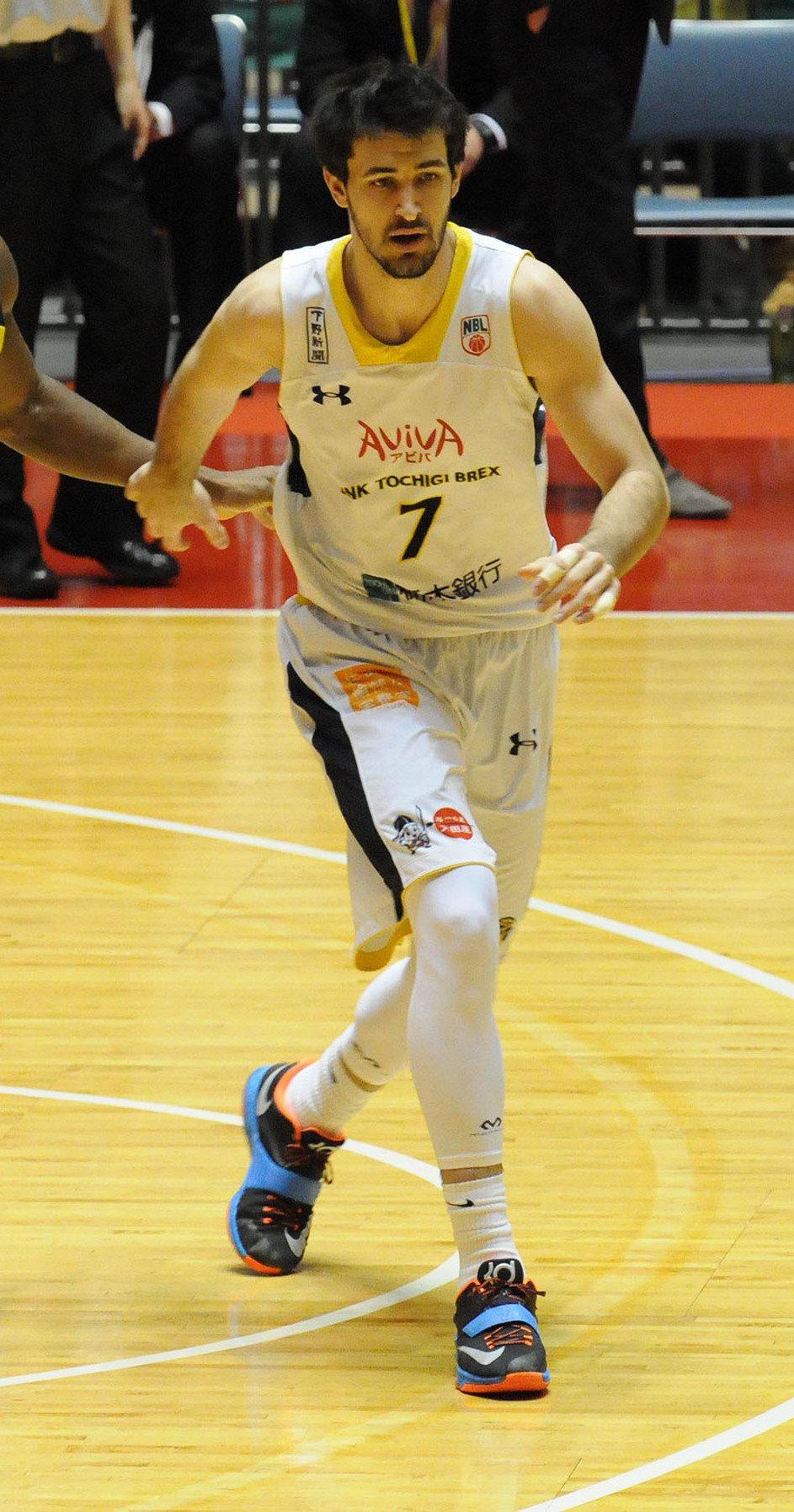

Free agent
- Position: Center

Personal information
- Born: September 12, 1989 (age 36) Orange County, California, U. S.
- Listed height: 6 ft 10 in (2.08 m)
- Listed weight: 250 lb (113 kg)

Career information
- High school: Pacifica (Garden Grove, California); Summit Prep (Redwood City, California)
- College: Idaho (2009–2013)
- NBA draft: 2013: undrafted
- Playing career: 2013–present

Career history
- 2013: PGE Turów Zgorzelec
- 2014: Alba Fehérvár
- 2014–2015: Link Tochigi Brex
- 2015–2016: Kingman Kaoliang Liquor
- 2016–2018: Aomori Wat's
- 2018–2019: Saigon Heat
- 2019: Columbian Dyip
- 2019: San-en NeoPhoenix
- 2019–2020: Osaka Evessa
- 2020: Koshigaya Alphas
- 2020: Alvark Tokyo
- 2020: Aomori Wat's
- 2020–2021: Earthfriends Tokyo Z
- 2021: Kumamoto Volters
- 2021–2022: Gunma Crane Thunders
- 2022: Saga Ballooners

Career highlights
- AP Honorable mention All-American (2013); WAC Player of the Year (2013); First-team All-WAC (2013); Second-team All-WAC (2012)
- Stats at Basketball Reference

Kyle James Barone (born September 12, 1989) is an American basketball player who played for the Saga Ballooners of the B2 League. He was the Western Athletic Conference Player of the Year as a senior in 2012–13 after leading the WAC in scoring (18.2) and rebounding (10.9) in conference games. Barone became the first player from the University of Idaho to be named the men's basketball player of the year in the WAC.

In Barone's four-year career between 2009–10 and 2012–13 he appeared in a school record 125 games. He graduated with 1,414 points—the fourth highest total in school history—as well as 864 rebounds, which ranks second. Heading into his senior season he was suspended indefinitely by head coach Don Verlin for violating team rules but was re-instated before the first regular season game. For his career, Barone averaged 11.4 points, 6.9 rebounds, 1.2 assists, 1.0 blocks and 0.4 steals. He plays the center position.

== Professional career ==
On October 24, 2013, Barone signed with PGE Turów Zgorzelec in Poland. After 5 games, Barone left PGE Turów, after averaging 2.4 points and 1.8 rebounds per game. In November 2015, Barone signed with Kingman Kaoliang Liquor in Taiwan's Super Basketball League. While with Link Tochigi Brex, Barone averaged 10.4 points and 8.0 rebounds per game.

In April 2019, Barone signed with the Columbian Dyip of the Philippine Basketball Association as the team's import for the 2019 PBA Commissioner's Cup.
