= Kirk Earlywine =

American college basketball coach

Current position
- Title: Assistant coach

Biographical details
- Born: July 4, 1964 (age 62); Indianapolis, Indiana, U.S.
- Education: Campbell

Coaching career (HC unless noted)
- 1985–1987: Campbell (asst.)
- 1987–1989: Ball State (asst.)
- 1989–1993: Utah (asst.)
- 1993–1995: Central Michigan (asst.)
- 1995–1996: Pfeiffer
- 1996–1999: Milwaukee (asst.)
- 1999–2006: Weber State (asst.)
- 2006–2007: UNC Wilmington (asst.)
- 2007–2011: Eastern Washington
- 2013–2019: Idaho (asst.)

Administrative career (AD unless noted)
- 2012–2013: Idaho (director of player development)

Head coaching record
- Overall: 63–86 (.423)
- Tournaments: 1–1 (NCAA Division II)

Kirk Sanford Earlywine (born July 4, 1964) is an American college basketball coach who was most recently an assistant coach at the University of Idaho. Earlywine was head coach at Pfeiffer and Eastern Washington and has been an assistant coach at multiple other colleges.

== Early life and education ==
Born in Indianapolis, Earlywine graduated from Campbell University in 1987 with a degree in physical education. He got his first coaching experience at Campbell, serving as a student assistant for the Fighting Camels.

== Coaching career ==
Earlywine's first full-time coaching experience came under the tutelage of Rick Majerus, beginning in 1987 at Ball State University for two seasons. Earlywine was part of the 1988–89 Ball State team that went 29–3 and qualified for the second round of the 1989 NCAA tournament. Earlywine then followed Majerus for his next assistant coaching job at the University of Utah, whey they worked together from 1989 to 1993 during four successful seasons, including the 1990–91 season with a 30–4 record and NCAA Sweet 16 appearance.

From 1993 to 1995, Earlywine was an assistant coach at Central Michigan under Leonard Drake. Earlywine had his first head coaching job in 1995–96 at Pfeiffer University, an NCAA Division II school in North Carolina. Earlywine led Pfeiffer to a 21–8 record and NCAA D-II Tournament appearance in his only season at the helm.

Earlywine returned to the Division I level, starting as an assistant coach at Milwaukee from 1996 to 1999. From 1999 to 2006, Earlywine was an assistant coach at Weber State for the entirety of Joe Cravens's tenure as head coach, during which Weber State qualified for the 2003 NCAA tournament. Earlywine spent the 2006–07 season on Benny Moss's staff at UNC Wilmington as an assistant.

On June 14, 2007, Eastern Washington hired Earlywine to replace the fired Mike Burns. Earlywine went 42–78 in four seasons at Eastern Washington. On March 7, 2011, Eastern Washington made the decision not to renew Earlywine's contract.

Earlywine worked for the regional TV network SWX Right Now as a college basketball color commentator during the 2011–12 season. In 2012, Earlywine joined the staff of Don Verlin at Idaho as director of player development before being promoted to assistant coach in 2013. In September 2019, three months after firing Verlin, Idaho placed Earlywine on administrative leave.

== Head coaching record ==
Record table
Season	Team	Overall	Conference	Standing	Postseason
Pfeiffer Falcons (Conference Carolinas) (1995–1996)
1995–96	Pfeiffer	21–8	14–4	T–2nd	NCAA Division II Second Round
Pfeiffer:		21–8 (.724)	14–4 (.778)		
Eastern Washington Eagles (Big Sky Conference) (2007–2011)
2007–08	Eastern Washington	11–19	6–10	T–8th	
2008–09	Eastern Washington	12–18	6–10	T–6th	
2009–10	Eastern Washington	9–21	5–11	7th	
2010–11	Eastern Washington	10–20	7–9	T–6th	
Eastern Washington:		42–78 (.350)	24–40 (.375)		
Total:		63–86 (.423)			
