= 1999–2000 Idaho Vandals men's basketball team =

American college basketball season

1999–2000 Idaho Vandals men's basketball
- Conference: Big West Conference
- Record: 12–17 (6–10 Big West)
- Head coach: David Farrar (3rd season)
- Assistant coach: Chris Jans (1st season)
- Home arena: Kibbie Dome

1999–2000 Big West men's basketball standings
	Conf.				Overall
Team	W		L	PCT	W		L	PCT
East Division
Utah State†	16	–	0	1.000	28	–	6	.824
New Mexico State	11	–	5	.688	22	–	10	.688
Nevada	6	–	10	.375	9	–	20	.310
Idaho	6	–	10	.375	12	–	17	.414
Boise State	6	–	10	.375	12	–	15	.444
North Texas	5	–	11	.313	7	–	20	.259
West Division
Long Beach State	15	–	1	.938	24	–	6	.800
UC Santa Barbara	10	–	6	.625	14	–	14	.500
UC Irvine	7	–	9	.438	14	–	14	.500
Pacific	6	–	10	.375	11	–	18	.379
Cal Poly	5	–	11	.313	10	–	18	.357
Cal State Fullerton	3	–	13	.188	8	–	19	.296
† 2000 Big West tournament winner As of April 10, 2000; Rankings from AP poll

The 1999–2000 Idaho Vandals men's basketball team represented the University of Idaho during the 1999–2000 NCAA Division I men's basketball season. Members of the Big West Conference, the Vandals were led by third-year head coach David Farrar and played their home games on campus at the Kibbie Dome in Moscow, Idaho.

The Vandals were 12–16 overall in the regular season and 6–10 in conference play, tied for third in the East division standings.

They met West division champion Long Beach State in the first round of the conference tournament and lost by eleven points.

== Postseason result ==
Date time, TV	Rank^{#}	Opponent^{#}	Result	Record	Site (attendance) city, state
Big West tournament
Thu, March 9; 12:00 pm	(E4)	vs. (W1) Long Beach State; Quarterfinal	L 86–97	12–17	Lawlor Events Center; Reno, Nevada
*Non-conference game. (#) Tournament seedings in parentheses. All times are in Pacific time.
