= Gordon Scott (basketball) =

American basketball player

VfL Kirchheim Knights (2008–2011)
- Position: Swingman

Personal information
- Born: December 26, 1976 (age 49) Hollywood, California

Career information
- College: Idaho
- Drafted by: Dragons Rhöndorf

Gordon Scott (born December 26, 1976) is an American professional basketball swingman who played for the VfL Kirchheim Knights from 2008 to 2011.

== Career ==
Scott played college basketball with the Idaho Vandals men's basketball team and later for the Dakota Wizards. He was not drafted in the 2000 NBA draft and began playing in Germany with the Dragons Rhöndorf. For the next season, he was traded to Riesen Ludwigsburg, where he played two seasons in the Basketball Bundesliga.
