= Trevon Allen =

American basketball player

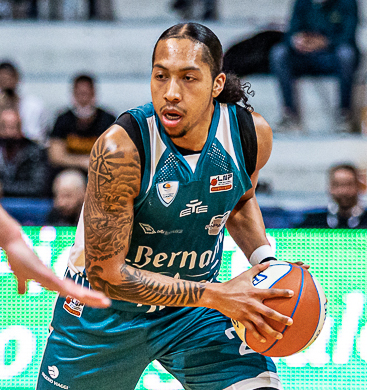
- Allen with Pallacanestro Cantù in 2022

No. 25 – Anwil Włocławek
- Position: Point guard / shooting guard
- League: PLK

Personal information
- Born: February 16, 1998 (age 28) Clarkston, Washington, U.S.
- Listed height: 6 ft 2 in (1.88 m)
- Listed weight: 190 lb (86 kg)

Career information
- High school: Clarkston (Clarkston, Washington)
- College: Idaho (2016–2020)
- NBA draft: 2020: undrafted
- Playing career: 2020–present

Career history
- 2020–2021: Starogard Gdański
- 2021–2022: Pallacanestro Cantù
- 2022–2023: JuVi Cremona
- 2023–2024: CSO Voluntari
- 2024–2025: Karditsa
- 2025–2026: Golden Eagle Ylli
- 2026–present: Anwil Włocławek

Career highlights
- Second-team All-Big Sky (2020)

Trevon Allen (born February 16, 1998) is an American professional basketball player for Anwil Włocławek of the Polish Basketball League (PLK). He played college basketball for the Idaho Vandals.

== High school career ==
Allen was born on 16 February 1998. He grew up on the Nez Perce Tribe reservation in Lapwai, Idaho. Allen attended Clarkston High School in Washington. As a junior and senior, he was named Great Northern League player of the year. Allen averaged 17.3 points and 4.5 rebounds per game, shooting 41 percent from 3-point range. Allen led Clarkston to back-to-back Class 2A Washington state titles in 2015 and 2016 and a combined 51–2 record. He averaged 24.5 points per game as a senior while earning Washington 2A player of the year. On September 17, 2015, Allen committed to Idaho over an offer from Eastern Washington.

== College career ==
As a freshman, Allen averaged 5.1 points and 2.1 rebounds per game and made 11 starts. With the return of starting point guard Perrion Callendret from injury, Allen saw fewer minutes as a sophomore and averaged 4.2 points and 1.9 rebounds per game. As a junior, he averaged 14.0 points per game, 4.2 rebounds and 3.0 assists per game. Following his junior season in which Idaho finished 5–27, coach Don Verlin was fired. During Allen's senior year, he emerged as a leader on the team, playing both guard positions and small forward, and was called "a great ambassador for our program and this university" by new coach Zac Claus. On February 8, 2020, Allen scored a career-high 36 points in an 82–71 loss against Montana. In his final three games, he scored 33 points in a win over Idaho State, 32 points in a loss to Weber State and 35 points in a loss to Southern Utah. As a senior, Allen averaged 21.6 points, 4.9 rebounds and 1.7 assists per game while shooting 44.9 percent from the field. He earned Second Team All-Big Sky honors.

== Professional career ==
On July 10, 2020, Allen signed his first professional contract with Starogard Gdański of the Polish Basketball League. He averaged 19.5 points. 5.2 rebounds and 2.8 assists per game. On August 9, 2021, Allen signed with Pallacanestro Cantù of the Lega Basket Serie A.

On January 28, 2026, he signed with Anwil Włocławek of the Polish Basketball League (PLK).

=== The Basketball Tournament ===
Allen joined the Peoria All-Stars in The Basketball Tournament 2020 after Vandals teammate A.J. Youngman asked him if he would like to play for his father, an assistant coach for the All-Stars. Allen scored 26 points and grabbed eight rebounds in the 80–65 opening round loss to Herd That.

On July 31, 2024, he joined Karditsa of the Greek Basket League.

== Personal life ==
Allen's father, Alan Allen, played football at Idaho and had a three-year career in the World League of American Football. His mother Sonya Samuels Allen is a Nez Perce tribal housing official, and she enrolled her son in the Confederated Tribes of the Umatilla Indian Reservation. Allen's younger brother Tru is the all-time leading scorer at Clarkston High School and committed to play for Northwest Nazarene.
