= Coulee Dam, Washington =

Coulee Dam
- Town
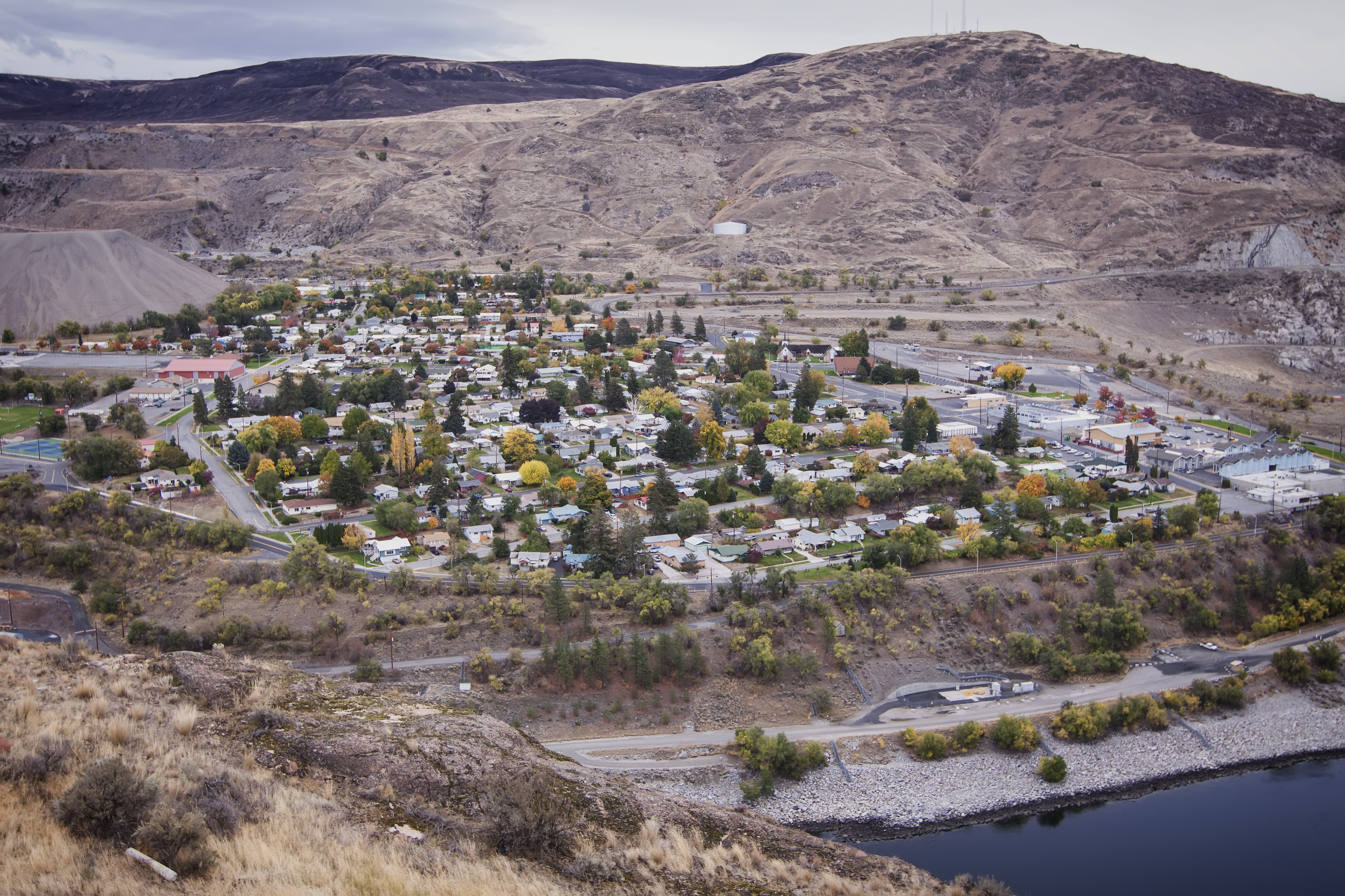

- Location of Coulee Dam, Washington
- Coordinates: 47°58′08″N 118°58′34″W
- Country: United States
- State: Washington
- Counties: Okanogan, Douglas, Grant

Government
  - Type: Mayor–council
  - Mayor: Bob Poch

Area
  - Total: 0.79 sq mi (2.05 km^{2})
  - Land: 0.71 sq mi (1.85 km^{2})
  - Water: 0.073 sq mi (0.19 km^{2})
- Elevation: 1,152 ft (351 m)

Population (2020)
  - Total: 1,211
  - Density: 1,508.8/sq mi (582.56/km^{2})
- Time zone: UTC-8 (Pacific (PST))
  - Summer (DST): UTC-7 (PDT)
- ZIP code: 99116
- Area code: 509
- FIPS code: 53-15115
- GNIS feature ID: 2413249
- Website: townofcouleedam.org

Coulee Dam is a town in Douglas, Grant, and Okanogan counties in the US state of Washington. The Douglas County portion of Coulee Dam is part of the Wenatchee metropolitan area. The population was 1,211 as of the 2020 census.

== History ==
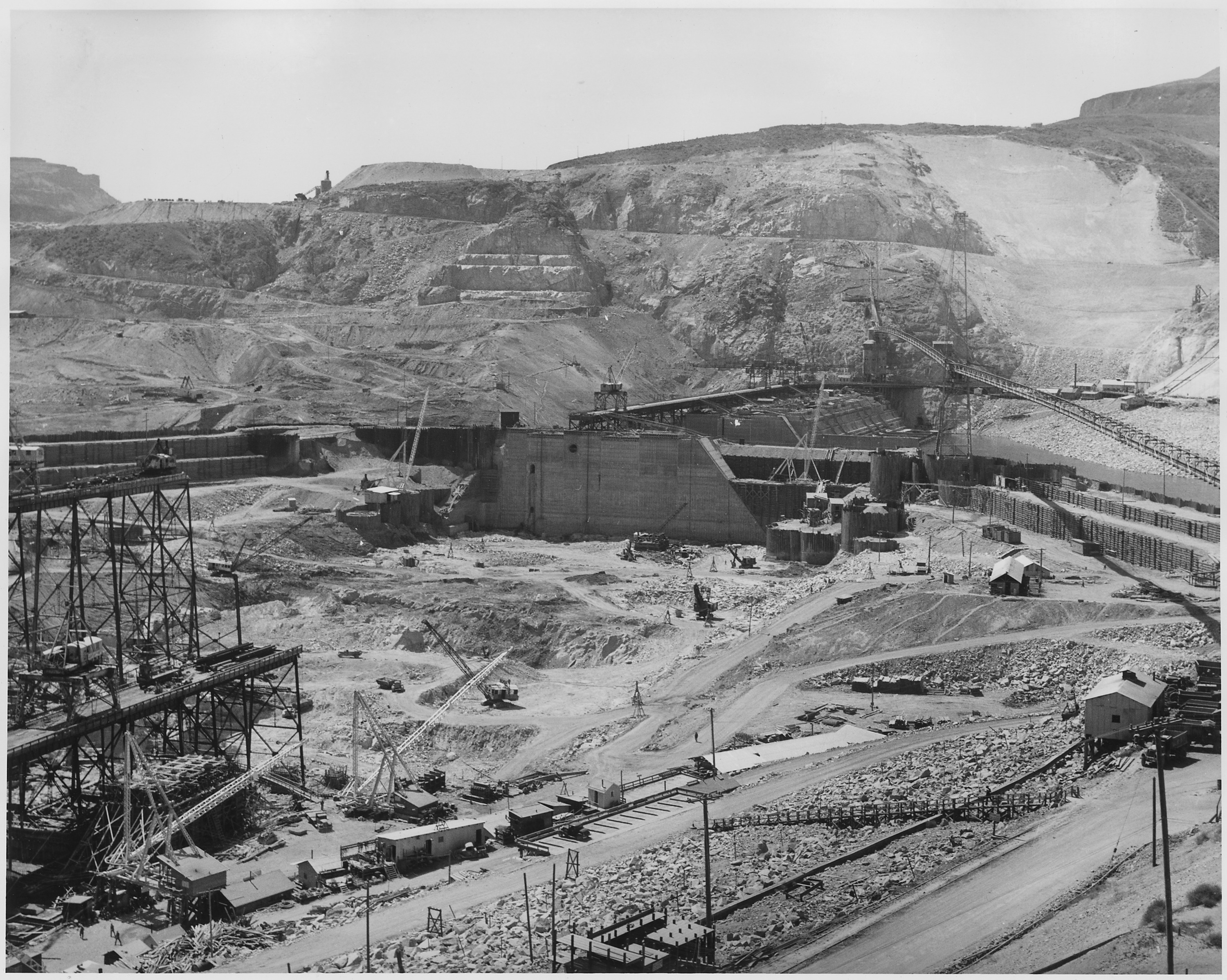
Dam under construction, possibly around 1937

Coulee Dam was founded by the U.S. Bureau of Reclamation in 1933, to serve as headquarters for the construction of the Grand Coulee Dam. The Okanogan County portion was known as Mason City, location of the head contractor. The portions in Douglas and Grant Counties were known as Engineers Town and were government-owned. In 1942, with the end of the contract in sight, CBI transferred control of Mason City to the Municipal Division of the Columbia Basin Project. In 1948, Mason City was incorporated into Coulee Dam. The government began the process of selling the town to the public in 1957, finishing in 1959. Coulee Dam was officially incorporated as a town on February 26, 1959.

It is the headquarters of Lake Roosevelt National Recreation Area and home to one of the world's largest man-made piles of sand, a 12,000,000-cubic-yard (9,200,000 m^{3}), 230-foot (70 m)-high hill remaining from dam construction.

== Geography ==
The Okanogan County portion lies within the Colville Indian Reservation, and forms the southern limit of the Okanogan Highlands.

According to the United States Census Bureau, the town has a total area of 0.78 square miles (2.02 km^{2}), of which, 0.72 square miles (1.86 km^{2}) is land and 0.06 square miles (0.16 km^{2}) is water.

=== Climate ===
This climatic region is typified by large seasonal temperature differences, with warm to hot (and often humid) summers and cold (sometimes severely cold) winters. According to the Köppen Climate Classification system, Coulee Dam has a humid continental climate, abbreviated "Dfb" on climate maps.

Climate data for Coulee Dam, WA
Month	Jan	Feb	Mar	Apr	May	Jun	Jul	Aug	Sep	Oct	Nov	Dec	Year
Record high °F (°C)	57 (14)	61 (16)	74 (23)	92 (33)	100 (38)	105 (41)	113 (45)	110 (43)	104 (40)	90 (32)	69 (21)	58 (14)	113 (45)
Mean daily maximum °F (°C)	32.2 (0.1)	39.7 (4.3)	50.7 (10.4)	61.7 (16.5)	71.0 (21.7)	78.5 (25.8)	87.6 (30.9)	86.4 (30.2)	77.2 (25.1)	61.5 (16.4)	43.6 (6.4)	34.4 (1.3)	60.4 (15.8)
Mean daily minimum °F (°C)	21.6 (−5.8)	25.7 (−3.5)	31.5 (−0.3)	38.2 (3.4)	45.8 (7.7)	52.5 (11.4)	58.3 (14.6)	57.5 (14.2)	50.3 (10.2)	40.6 (4.8)	31.4 (−0.3)	24.6 (−4.1)	39.8 (4.3)
Record low °F (°C)	−17 (−27)	−15 (−26)	0 (−18)	20 (−7)	27 (−3)	36 (2)	32 (0)	38 (3)	30 (−1)	10 (−12)	−10 (−23)	−16 (−27)	−17 (−27)
Average precipitation inches (mm)	1.07 (27)	0.92 (23)	0.88 (22)	0.83 (21)	1.10 (28)	1.04 (26)	0.47 (12)	0.41 (10)	0.49 (12)	0.72 (18)	1.24 (31)	1.39 (35)	10.55 (268)
Average snowfall inches (cm)	6.1 (15)	2.5 (6.4)	0.8 (2.0)	0.0 (0.0)	0.0 (0.0)	0.0 (0.0)	0.0 (0.0)	0.0 (0.0)	0.0 (0.0)	0.0 (0.0)	1.5 (3.8)	4.6 (12)	15.5 (39)

== Demographics ==
Historical population
Census	Pop.	Note	%±
1960	1,344		—
1970	1,425		6.0%
1980	1,412		−0.9%
1990	1,087		−23.0%
2000	1,044		−4.0%
2010	1,098		5.2%
2020	1,211		10.3%
U.S. Decennial Census; 2020 Census

=== 2010 census ===
As of the 2010 census, there were 1,098 people, 459 households, and 301 families living in the town. The population density was 1,525.0 inhabitants per square mile (588.8/km^{2}). There were 534 housing units at an average density of 741.7 per square mile (286.4/km^{2}). The racial makeup of the town was 55.0% White, 0.5% African American, 35.5% Native American, 0.7% Asian, 2.4% from other races, and 5.9% from two or more races. Hispanic or Latino of any race were 6.7% of the population.

There were 459 households, of which 29.8% had children under the age of 18 living with them, 42.9% were married couples living together, 15.7% had a female householder with no husband present, 7.0% had a male householder with no wife present, and 34.4% were non-families. 30.5% of all households were made up of individuals, and 12.9% had someone living alone who was 65 years of age or older. The average household size was 2.39 and the average family size was 2.93.

The median age in the town was 41.6 years. 24.8% of residents were under the age of 18; 5.7% were between the ages of 18 and 24; 23.1% were from 25 to 44; 28.8% were from 45 to 64; and 17.5% were 65 years of age or older. The gender makeup of the town was 49.9% male and 50.1% female.

=== 2000 census ===
As of the 2000 census, there were 1,044 people, 448 households, and 305 families living in the town. The population density was 1,532.5 people per square mile (592.8/km^{2}). There were 499 housing units at an average density of 732.5 per square mile (283.3/km^{2}). The racial makeup of the town was 64.56% White, 0.29% African American, 29.12% Native American, 0.48% Asian, 0.57% from other races, and 4.98% from two or more races. Hispanic or Latino of any race were 2.78% of the population.

There were 448 households, out of which 25.7% had children under the age of 18 living with them, 52.0% were married couples living together, 11.4% had a female householder with no husband present, and 31.7% were non-families. 27.7% of all households were made up of individuals, and 13.8% had someone living alone who was 65 years of age or older. The average household size was 2.32 and the average family size was 2.74.

In the town, the population was spread out, with 22.9% under the age of 18, 7.1% from 18 to 24, 20.7% from 25 to 44, 29.0% from 45 to 64, and 20.3% who were 65 years of age or older. The median age was 44 years. For every 100 females, there were 93.3 males. For every 100 females age 18 and over, there were 90.3 males.

The median income for a household in the town was $37,391, and the median income for a family was $45,066. Males had a median income of $38,000 versus $22,500 for females. The per capita income for the town was $18,791. About 6.7% of families and 9.8% of the population were below the poverty line, including 14.9% of those under age 18 and 11.0% of those age 65 or over.

== Education ==
The town is served by the Grand Coulee Dam School District.

== Notable person ==
- Lawrence Colburn, born in Coulee Dam, one of three people to have intervened in the My Lai massacre
