= Don Verlin =

American basketball player-coach

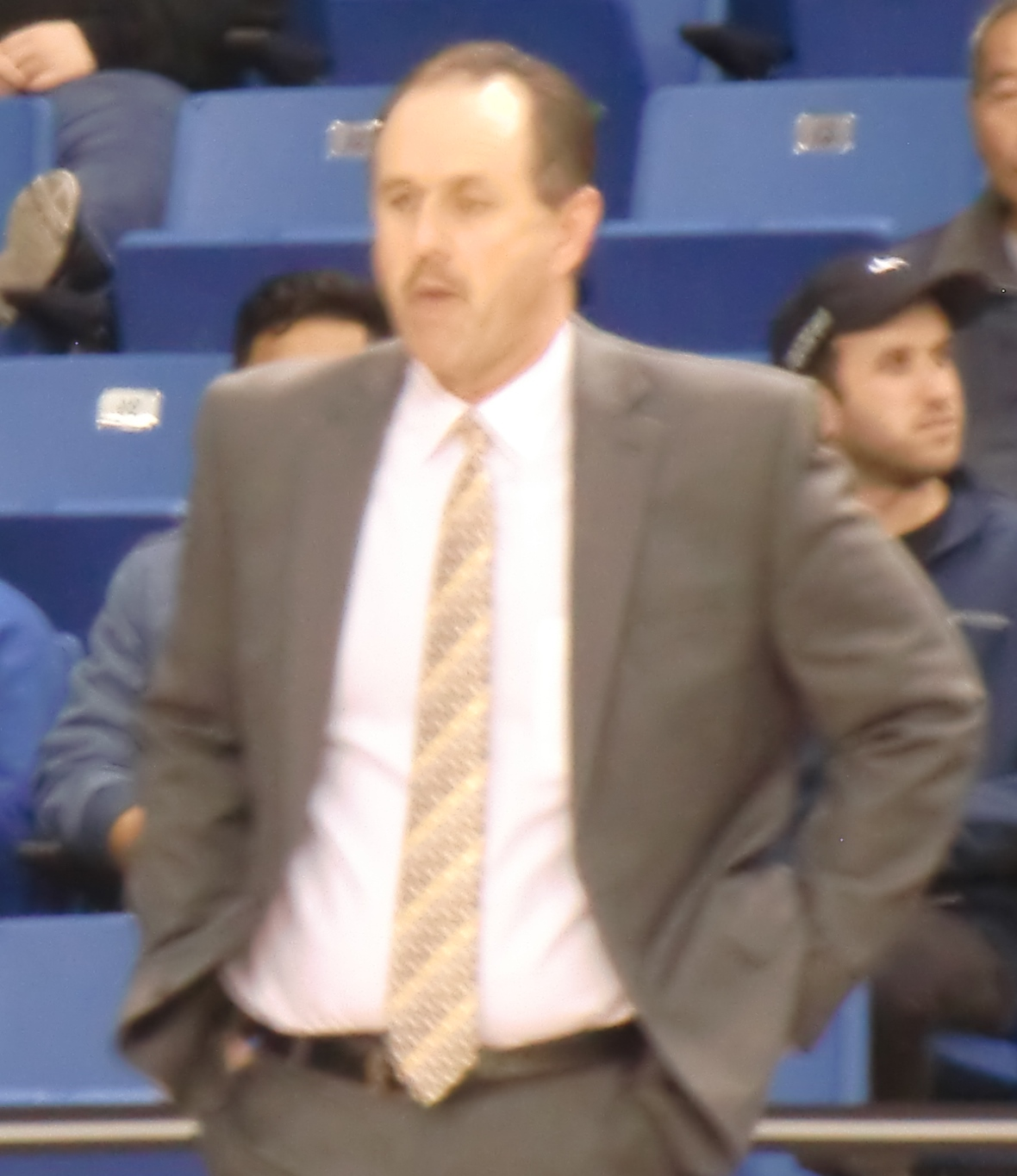
- Verlin in 2015

Biographical details
- Born: June 15, 1965 (age 61); Roseville, California, U.S.
- Education: California State University, Stanislaus; Colorado State University

Coaching career (HC unless noted)
- 1983–1984: Del Oro HS (freshmen)
- 1984–1985: Placer HS (JV)
- 1989–1991: Columbia (CA) (assistant)
- 1991–1992: Colorado State (assistant)
- 1992–1994: Cal State Bakersfield (assistant)
- 1994–1998: Colorado State (assistant)
- 1998–2008: Utah State (assistant)
- 2008–2019: Idaho

Head coaching record
- Overall: 177–176 (.501)

Donald Gene Verlin (born June 15, 1965) is an American college basketball coach who was most recently the head coach at the University of Idaho from 2008 to 2019. Prior to Idaho, Verlin was an assistant coach at Colorado State, Utah State, and Cal State Bakersfield.

== Early life and education ==
Born in Roseville, California, Verlin graduated from Del Oro High School in Loomis in 1983. He graduated from California State University, Stanislaus in 1991 with a bachelor's degree in physical education and Colorado State University in 1993 with a master's degree in education.

== Coaching career ==
=== High school and junior college (1983–1991) ===
With his twin brother Ron, Don Verlin was freshman basketball co-head coach at Del Oro High for a season after graduating from high school before coaching junior varsity one season at Placer High School. Verlin then coached from 1989 to 1991 at the junior college level, as an assistant at Columbia College in Sonora, California.

=== College assistant coach (1991–2008) ===
Later, Verlin moved up to the NCAA as an assistant at Colorado State under Stew Morrill in the 1991–92 season. Then, from 1992 to 1994, Verlin was an assistant at Cal State Bakersfield under Pat Douglass for back-to-back NCAA Division II championship seasons.

In 1994, Verlin rejoined Colorado State, again under Stew Morrill, as an assistant and stayed for four seasons. Verlin followed Morrill to Utah State in 1998. In ten seasons with Utah State, Verlin helped Utah State reach eight postseason appearances and eight 20-plus win seasons.

=== Idaho (2008–2019) ===
On March 21, 2008, the University of Idaho hired Verlin as head coach for the Idaho Vandals men's basketball team. Inheriting a team that went 8–21 Verlin led Idaho to a 17–16 (9–7 WAC) record and second round appearance in the 2009 CollegeInsider.com Postseason Tournament (CIT) in his first season. Idaho's win in the first round of the CIT was the program's first postseason victory since the 1982 NCAA tournament. After a 15–16 season in 2009–10, Verlin led winning teams in the next two seasons. Idaho went 18–14 (9–7 WAC) with an appearance in the 2011 CIT in 2010–11. In 2011–12, Idaho went 19–14 (9–5 WAC) and qualified for the second round of the 2012 CIT. The 2012–13 Idaho team finished 12–18, but Kyle Barone became Idaho's first WAC Player of the Year in program history.

Following the 2013–14 season, Idaho moved from the WAC to Big Sky Conference. Verlin had his first 20-win season in 2015–16, as Idaho finished 21–13 and third in the Big Sky standings with a 12–6 conference record with an appearance in the 2016 College Basketball Invitational (CBI). In 2016–17, Idaho had another successful season with a 19–14 (12–6 Big Sky) and second round appearance in the 2017 CIT.

In 2017–18, Verlin had his most successful season at Idaho, with a 22–9 (14–4, second in Big Sky standings) record. However, Idaho did not appear in any postseason tournament, because the seniors declined to play in the CBI or CIT. Following his most successful season, Verlin would have his worst win–loss record at Idaho the next season at 5–27 in 2018–19. That would be his final season, and Verlin cumulatively had a 177–176 record in 11 seasons, the most total wins for any Idaho coach.

Three weeks after being placed on administrative leave due to an investigation into NCAA violations, Verlin was fired for cause by Idaho on June 14, 2019. Assistant coach Zac Claus served as interim head coach for the 2019–2020 season.

On June 18, 2020, the NCAA issued Verlin a one-year show-cause penalty and Idaho men's basketball two years of probation. Among violations that the NCAA found happened from 2015 to 2019, Verlin promoted an undergraduate student manager who had not completed his degree to director of basketball operations and allowed the newly promoted director of operations to coach during games.

== Personal life ==
Verlin is married and has two children, and his twin brother Ron was also a college basketball coach, most recently at the University of the Pacific.

== Head coaching record ==
Record table
Season	Team	Overall	Conference	Standing	Postseason
Idaho Vandals (Western Athletic Conference) (2008–2014)
2008–09	Idaho	17–16	9–7	T–3rd	CIT Quarterfinals
2009–10	Idaho	15–16	6–10	T–6th	
2010–11	Idaho	18–14	9–7	T–3rd	CIT First Round
2011–12	Idaho	19–14	9–5	3rd	CIT Second Round
2012–13	Idaho	12–18	7–11	6th	
2013–14	Idaho	16–18	7–9	T–5th	
Idaho (WAC):		97–96 (.503)	47–49 (.490)		
Idaho Vandals (Big Sky Conference) (2014–present)
2014–15	Idaho	13–17	8–10	T–7th	
2015–16	Idaho	21–13	12–6	3rd	CBI First Round
2016–17	Idaho	19–14	12–6	T–3rd	CIT Second Round
2017–18	Idaho	22–9	14–4	2nd	
2018–19	Idaho	5–27	2–18	11th	
Idaho (Big Sky):		80–80 (.500)	48–44 (.522)		
Idaho:		177–176 (.501)	95–93 (.505)		
Total:		177–176 (.501)			
National champion Postseason invitational champion Conference regular season champion Conference regular season and conference tournament champion Division regular season champion Division regular season and conference tournament champion Conference tournament champion
