= Brayon Blake =

American basketball player

Free agent
- Position: Small forward

Personal information
- Born: December 8, 1995 (age 30)
- Listed height: 6 ft 7 in (2.01 m)
- Listed weight: 220 lb (100 kg)

Career information
- High school: Garfield (Seattle, Washington)
- College: Cochise College (2014–2015); North Idaho College (2015–2016); Idaho (2016–2018)
- NBA draft: 2018: undrafted
- Playing career: 2018–present

Career history
- 2018–2019: Löwen Braunschweig
- 2019–2020: Peristeri
- 2020: Manisa Büyükşehir Belediye
- 2020–2021: Sigortam.net Istanbul
- 2021: Gießen 46ers
- 2022: Ferraroni Juvi Cremona
- 2024–2025: Knox Raiders

Career highlights
- First-team All-Big Sky (2018)

Brayon Blake (born December 8, 1995) is an American professional basketball player. He played college basketball at Cochise College, North Idaho College and Idaho.

== College career ==
Blake began his collegiate career at Cochise College, where he led the team with 16.4 points and 10.3 rebounds per game, before transferring to North Idaho College prior to his sophomore year. At North Idaho, Blake averaged 21.2 points and 6.6 rebounds per game and was named to the Third Team NJCAA All-America. He committed to play at the University of Idaho for the final two seasons of his eligibility.

In his first season with the Vandals, Blake led the team with 6.1 rebounds per game and finished second with 10.0 points per game over 32 games (10 starts). As a senior, he was named first team All-Big Sky Conference after averaging 17.0 points and a conference-leading 9.6 rebounds per game.

== Professional career ==
On July 19, 2018, Blake signed with Basketball Löwen Braunschweig of the German Basketball Bundesliga. In his first professional season, Blake averaged 9.1 points, 4 rebounds and 1 assist over 37 BBL games.

On July 18, 2019, Blake signed with Peristeri B.C. of the Greek Basket League. In February 2020, he left Peristeri and signed with Manisa Büyükşehir Belediye of the Turkish Basketball First League.

On August 9, 2020, Blake signed with Sigortam.net Istanbul of the Turkish Basketball First League.

On July 1, 2021, Blake signed with Gießen 46ers of the Basketball Bundesliga. He left the team in December 2021 after ten games.

For the 2022–23 season, Blake joined Italian team Ferraroni Juvi Cremona, but he left in December 2022 after nine games.

In May 2024, Blake had a one-game stint with the Knox Raiders of the NBL1 South in Australia. He was part of the Raiders' coaching staff during the 2024 NBL1 National Finals. He returned to the Raiders for the 2025 season, playing 17 games.
