= Victor Sanders =

American basketball player

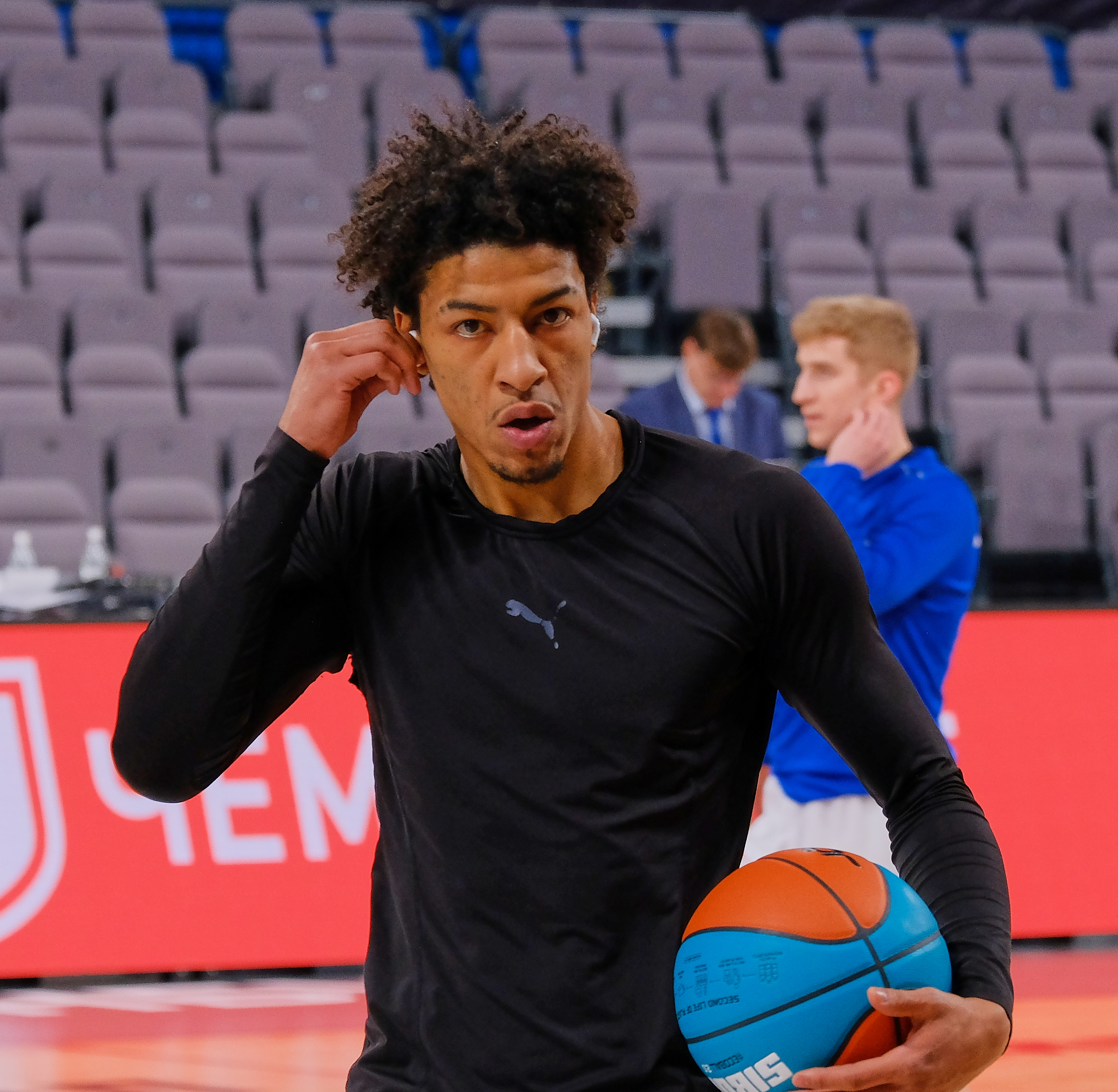

No. 6 – Parma
- Position: Shooting guard
- League: VTB United League

Personal information
- Born: February 16, 1995 (age 31)
- Listed height: 1.96 m (6 ft 5 in)
- Listed weight: 90 kg (198 lb)

Career information
- High school: Jefferson (Portland, Oregon)
- College: Idaho (2014–2018)
- NBA draft: 2018: undrafted
- Playing career: 2018–present

Career history
- 2018–2020: Antwerp Giants
- 2020–2021: Dolomiti Energia Trento
- 2021–2022: Reyer Venezia
- 2022–2023: U-BT Cluj-Napoca
- 2023–2024: Anwil Włocławek
- 2024–2025: Enisey
- 2025–present: Parma Basket

Career highlights
- PLK Most Valuable Player (2024); All-PLK Team (2024); FIBA Europe Cup champion (2023); First-team All-Big Sky (2017); Second-team All-Big Sky (2018)

Victor Sanders (born February 16, 1995) is an American basketball player for Parma of the VTB United League. He competed in college for Idaho.

== College career ==
Sanders tore his ACL in his right knee before starting college at the University of Idaho but started playing basketball three months after surgery without medical approval. He received limited minutes as a freshman, scoring four points per game. He improved his scoring average to 14 points per game as a sophomore. As a junior, Sanders averaged 20.9 points per game and became a team leader. He was selected to the First Team All-Big Sky as a junior. As a senior, Sanders was named to the Second Team All-Big Sky. He was also selected to the second-team NABC All-District 6. Sanders averaged 19 points per game as a senior and led the Vandals to a second-place finish in the Big Sky Conference. He finished second on the all-time scoring list at Idaho with 1,804 points.

== Professional career ==
After going undrafted in the 2018 NBA draft, Sanders played two games for the Denver Nuggets in the NBA Summer League. Sanders signed his first professional contract with the Belgian squad Antwerp Giants on August 5, 2018.

On July 2, 2020, he has signed with Dolomiti Energia Trento of the Italian Lega Basket Serie A. Sanders averaged 9.8 points per game.

On July 15, 2021, he signed with Reyer Venezia. Sanders was cut from the team after driving in the wrong direction on the highway.

On August 2, 2022, he signed with U-BT Cluj-Napoca of the Liga Națională.

On January 29, 2023, he signed with Anwil Włocławek of the Polish Basketball League. Sanders averaged 18.1 points, 4.7 assists, 2.7 rebounds and 1.5 steals per game. On August 19, 2024, he signed a contract with the Russian club Enisey of the VTB United League.
