= Weber State Wildcats men's basketball statistical leaders =

The Weber State Wildcats men's basketball statistical leaders are individual statistical leaders of the Weber State Wildcats men's basketball program in various categories, including points, assists, blocks, rebounds, and steals. Within those areas, the lists identify single-game, single-season, and career leaders. The Wildcats represent Weber State University in the NCAA's Big Sky Conference.

Weber State began competing in intercollegiate basketball in 1962. The NCAA did not officially record assists as a stat until the 1983–84 season, and blocks and steals until the 1985–86 season, but Weber State's record books includes players in these stats before these seasons. These lists are updated through the end of the 2020–21 season.

== Scoring ==
Career
Rk	Player	Points	Seasons
1	Jerrick Harding	2,247	2016–17 2017–18 2018–19 2019–20
2	Jeremy Senglin	2,078	2013–14 2014–15 2015–16 2016–17
3	Bruce Collins	2,019	1976–77 1977–78 1978–79 1979–80
4	Damian Lillard	1,934	2008–09 2009–10 2010–11 2011–12
5	Dillon Jones	1,782	2020–21 2021–22 2022–23 2023–24
6	Jimmy DeGraffenried	1,624	1990–91 1993–94 1994–95 1995–96
7	Jermaine Boyette	1,613	2000–01 2001–02 2002–03
8	Willie Sojourner	1,563	1968–69 1969–70 1970–71
9	Jimmie Watts	1,553	1972–73 1973–74 1974–75 1975–76
10	Joel Bolomboy	1,484	2012–13 2013–14 2014–15 2015–16

Season
Rk	Player	Points	Season
1	Damian Lillard	784	2011–12
2	Jeremy Senglin	719	2016–17
3	Harold Arceneaux	713	1998–99
4	Jerrick Harding	682	2017–18
5	Jermaine Boyette	657	2002–03
6	Stan Rose	650	1992–93
7	Bob Davis	646	1971–72
8	Jerrick Harding	645	2019–20
9	Harold Arceneaux	644	1999–00
	Dillon Jones	644	2023–24

Single game
Rk	Player	Points	Season	Opponent
1	Jerrick Harding	46	2017–18	Montana State
2	Stan Mayhew	45	1976–77	Utah State
3	Jerrick Harding	44	2019–20	Sacramento State
4	Damian Lillard	41	2011–12	San Jose State
5	Damian Lillard	40	2011–12	Portland State
	Harold Arceneaux	40	1999–00	Montana State
	Harold Arceneaux	40	1999–00	Eastern Washington
	Jerry Trice	40	1965–66	Northern Arizona
9	Harold Arceneaux	39	1999–00	Idaho State
	Harold Arceneaux	39	1998–99	Eastern Washington
	Bruce Collins	39	1976–77	Cal State Stanislaus
	Willie Sojourner	39	1969–70	Montana State
	Jim Lyon	39	1964–65	Whitworth
	Jim Lyon	39	1964–65	Cal State Los Angeles

== Rebounds ==
Career
Rk	Player	Rebounds	Seasons
1	Joel Bolomboy	1,312	2012–13 2013–14 2014–15 2015–16
2	Willie Sojourner	1,143	1968–69 1969–70 1970–71
3	Dillon Jones	1138	2020–21 2021–22 2022–23 2023–24
4	Jimmie Watts	949	1972–73 1973–74 1974–75 1975–76
5	Bruce Collins	873	1976–77 1977–78 1978–79 1979–80
6	Zach Braxton	780	2015–16 2016–17 2017–18 2018–19
7	Richard Smith	764	1976–77 1977–78 1978–79 1979–80
8	Kyndahl Hill	734	2013–14 2014–15 2015–16 2016–17
9	Al DeWitt	727	1972–73 1973–74 1974–75 1975–76
10	Royal Edwards	675	1979–80 1980–81 1981–82 1982–83

Season
Rk	Player	Rebounds	Season
1	Joel Bolomboy	415	2015–16
2	Willie Sojourner	411	1969–70
3	Willie Sojourner	392	1968–69
4	Dan Sparks	370	1967–68
5	Gene Visscher	358	1965–66
6	Dillon Jones	350	2021–22
	Dillon Jones	350	2022–23
8	Lance Allred	348	2004–05
9	Willie Sojourner	340	1970–71
10	Joel Bolomboy	329	2013–14

Single game
Rk	Player	Rebounds	Season	Opponent
1	Willie Sojourner	25	1969–70	W. Texas State
2	Bruce Collins	24	1976–77	CS Stanislaus
	Willie Sojourner	24	1970–71	Gonzaga
	Willie Sojourner	24	1969–70	Gonzaga
	Willie Sojourner	24	1969–70	Loyola Marymount
	Willie Sojourner	24	1968–69	Montana
	Gene Visscher	24	1965–66	Montana State
8	Dillon Jones	23	2023–24	Northern Colorado
	Joel Bolomboy	23	2015–16	Sacramento State
	Joel Bolomboy	23	2015–16	North Dakota
	Harry Willis	23	1986–87	Montana State
	Jimmie Watts	23	1974–75	Northern Arizona
	Willie Sojourner	23	1970–71	California
	Gene Visscher	23	1965–66	Idaho State

== Assists ==
Career
Rk	Player	Assists	Seasons
1	Mark Mattos	642	1976–77 1977–78 1978–79 1979–80
2	Dillon Jones	412	2020–21 2021–22 2022–23 2023–24
3	Damian Lillard	362	2008–09 2009–10 2010–11 2011–12
4	Jeremy Senglin	346	2013–14 2014–15 2015–16 2016–17
5	Eddie Gill	345	1998–99 1999–00
6	Robbie Johnson	325	1990–91 1991–92 1992–93 1993–94
7	Richard Escondon	304	1980–81 1981–82 1982–83
8	John Price	303	1982–83 1983–84
9	Jordan Richardson	300	2010–11 2011–12 2012–13 2013–14
10	Jermaine Boyette	294	2000–01 2001–02 2002–03

Season
Rk	Player	Assists	Season
1	Mark Mattos	213	1979–80
2	Aaron McCarthy	209	1984–85
3	Mark Mattos	200	1976–77
4	Eddie Gill	195	1999–00
5	Dillon Jones	162	2023–24
6	Ryan Cuff	152	1996–97
	John Price	152	1983–84
8	John Price	151	1982–83
9	Eddie Gill	150	1998–99
10	Robbie Johnson	141	1993–94
	Blaise Threatt	141	2024–25

Single game
Rk	Player	Assists	Season	Opponent
1	Mark Mattos	17	1976–77	Montana State
2	Eddie Gill	14	1999–00	Montana State
	Eddie Gill	14	1999–00	Southern Virginia
	Mark Mattos	14	1979–80	Idaho State
	Mark Mattos	14	1979–80	Nevada
6	Eddie Gill	13	1999–00	Sacramento State
	Mark Mattos	13	1976–77	Boise State
8	Aaron McCarthy	12	1984–85	Idaho State
	Aaron McCarthy	12	1984–85	Idaho State
	Aaron McCarthy	12	1984–85	US International
	Mark Mattos	12	1979–80	UNLV
	Mark Mattos	12	1979–80	Michigan State
	Mark Mattos	12	1979–80	Montana State
	Mark Mattos	12	1976–77	Idaho

== Steals ==
Career
Rk	Player	Steals	Seasons
1	Dillon Jones	208	2020–21 2021–22 2022–23 2023–24
2	Eddie Gill	178	1998–99 1999–00
3	Damien Baskerville	172	1995–96 1996–97 1997–98 1998–99
4	Jermaine Boyette	171	2000–01 2001–02 2002–03
5	Robbie Johnson	156	1990–91 1991–92 1992–93 1993–94
6	Jerrick Harding	131	2016–17 2017–18 2018–19 2019–20
7	Damian Lillard	129	2008–09 2009–10 2010–11 2011–12
8	Ruben Nembhard	121	1993–94 1994–95
9	Elroy Miller	116	1990–91 1991–92 1992–93 1993–94
10	Jeremy Senglin	110	2013–14 2014–15 2015–16 2016–17

Season
Rk	Player	Steals	Season
1	Eddie Gill	90	1999–00
2	Eddie Gill	88	1998–99
3	Robbie Johnson	82	1993–94
4	Ruben Nembhard	70	1994–95
5	Jermaine Boyette	62	2001–02
	Blaise Threatt	62	2024–25
7	Dillon Jones	61	2023–24
8	Dillon Jones	59	2021–22
9	Jermaine Boyette	57	2002–03
10	Franklin Session	55	2009–10
	Harold Arceneaux	55	1998–99

Single game
Rk	Player	Steals	Season	Opponent
1	Franklin Session	8	2009–10	Northern Arizona
	Damien Baskerville	8	1998–99	Utah
3	James Smith	7	1997–98	Northern Arizona
	Jason Joe	7	1991–92	Idaho State
	Alan Campbell	7	1985–86	Montana

== Blocks ==
Career
Rk	Player	Blocks	Seasons
1	Joel Bolomboy	179	2012–13 2013–14 2014–15 2015–16
2	Shawn Campbell	133	1983–84 1984–85
3	Kyndahl Hill	126	2013–14 2014–15 2015–16 2016–17
4	Kyle Tresnak	125	2010–11 2011–12 2012–13 2013–14
5	Michal Kozak	104	2017–18 2018–19 2019–20 2020–21 2021–22
6	Zach Braxton	100	2015–16 2016–17 2017–18 2018–19
	Brekkott Chapman	100	2017–18 2018–19
	Darin Mahoney	100	2008–09 2009–10 2010–11 2011–12
9	Daviin Davis	94	2006–07 2007–08 2008–09
10	Kirk Smith	89	1993–94 1994–95

Season
Rk	Player	Blocks	Season
1	Shawn Campbell	67	1983–84
2	Shawn Campbell	66	1984–85
3	Joel Bolomboy	62	2012–13
4	Kirk Smith	57	1993–94
5	Brekkott Chapman	55	2018–19
	Kyle Tresnak	55	2013–14
7	Kyndahl Hill	51	2016–17
	Joel Bolomboy	51	2014–15
9	Harold Arceneaux	50	1998–99
10	Daviin Davis	49	2008–09

Single game
Rk	Player	Blocks	Season	Opponent
1	Michal Kozak	7	2019–20	Northern Colorado
	Brian Devincenzi	7	1980–81	Simon Fraser
3	Brekkott Chapman	6	2018–19	Portland State
	Brekkott Chapman	6	2017–18	Utah Valley
	Kyndahl Hill	6	2016–17	Northern Arizona
	Zach Braxton	6	2015–16	Antelope Valley
	Arturas Valeika	6	2007–08	Sacramento State
	Walt Tyler	6	1985–86	Nevada
	Shawn Campbell	6	1984–85	SW Louisiana
	Shawn Campbell	6	1983–84	Montana
	Bruce Collins	6	1977–78	Gonzaga
