= 2006–07 Weber State Wildcats men's basketball team =

American college basketball season

2006–07 Weber State Wildcats men's basketball

Big Sky Regular Season and tournament champions

NCAA tournament, Round of 64
- Conference: Big Sky Conference
- Record: 20–12 (11–5 Big Sky)
- Head coach: Randy Rahe (1st season)
- Assistant coaches: Eric Duft; Phil Beckner; Kellen McCoy
- Home arena: Dee Events Center

2006–07 Big Sky men's basketball standings
	Conf.				Overall
Team	W		L	PCT	W		L	PCT
Weber State †	11	–	5	.688	20	–	12	.625
Northern Arizona	11	–	5	.688	18	–	12	.600
Montana	10	–	6	.625	17	–	15	.531
Portland State	9	–	7	.563	19	–	13	.594
Montana State	8	–	8	.500	11	–	19	.367
Idaho State	8	–	8	.500	13	–	17	.433
Eastern Washington	8	–	8	.500	15	–	14	.517
Sacramento State	5	–	11	.313	10	–	19	.345
Northern Colorado	2	–	14	.125	4	–	24	.143
† 2007 Big Sky tournament winner Rankings from AP Poll

The 2006–07 Weber State Wildcats men's basketball team represented Weber State University during the 2006–07 NCAA Division I men's basketball season. The Wildcats were led by first-year head coach Randy Rahe and played their home games at the Dee Events Center. They were members of the Big Sky Conference. They finished the season 20–12, 11–5 in Big Sky play to win the Big Sky regular season championship. They were also champions of the Big Sky Conference tournament to earn an automatic bid to the NCAA tournament where they lost in the opening round to eventual Final Four participant UCLA.

== Roster ==
2006–07 Weber State Wildcats men's basketball team
Players	Coaches
Pos. / # / Name / Height / Weight / Year / Hometown; F / 24 / David Patten / 6 ft 8 in (2.03 m) / 220 lb (100 kg) / Sr / Pepperdine / Placentia, California	Head coach: Randy Rahe; Assistant coach(es) Legend: (C) Team captain; (S) Suspended; (I) Ineligible; (W) Walk-on; Injured; Current redshirt

== Schedule and results ==
Date time, TV	Rank^{#}	Opponent^{#}	Result	Record	Site (attendance) city, state
Regular season
Nov 10, 2006*		Colorado Christian	W 83–57	1–0	Dee Events Center (2,479); Ogden, Utah
Nov 16, 2006*		at Alaska Fairbanks	W 71–66 ^{OT}	2–0	Carlson Center (2,568); Fairbanks, Alaska
Nov 18, 2006*		vs. Troy	W 66–61	3–0	Carlson Center (1,837); Fairbanks, Alaska
Nov 19, 2006*		vs. Utah State	L 55–68	3–1	Carlson Center (2,508); Fairbanks, Alaska
Nov 22, 2006*		Montana Tech	W 81–53	4–1	Dee Events Center (2,997); Ogden, Utah
Nov 25, 2006*		at Utah State	L 68–77	4–2	Dee Glen Smith Spectrum (6,973); Logan, Utah
Nov 29, 2006*		at Utah	L 55–67	4–3	Jon M. Huntsman Center (8,929); Salt Lake City, Utah
Dec 2, 2006*		Brigham Young	L 69–73 ^{OT}	4–4	Dee Events Center (6,326); Ogden, Utah
Dec 5, 2006*		at Portland	W 72–56	5–4	Chiles Center (1,006); Portland, Oregon
Dec 9, 2006*		at Southern Utah	L 63–75	5–5	Centrum Arena (4,036); Cedar City, Utah
Dec 16, 2006*		Portland	W 68–51	6–5	Dee Events Center (2,745); Ogden, Utah
Dec 19, 2006*		Southern Utah	W 59–57	7–5	Dee Events Center (3,143); Ogden, Utah
Dec 22, 2006*		at No. 17 Washington	L 51–80	7–6	Bank of America Arena (10,000); Seattle, Washington
Big Sky tournament
Mar 6, 2007*		Portland State; Semifinals	W 77–74	19–11	Dee Events Center (6,811); Ogden, Utah
Mar 7, 2007*		Northern Arizona; Championship game	W 88–80	20–11	Dee Events Center (9,178); Ogden, Utah
NCAA tournament
Mar 15, 2007*	(15 W)	vs. (2 W) No. 7 UCLA; First Round	L 42–70	20–12	ARCO Arena (16,338); Sacramento, California
*Non-conference game. ^{#}Rankings from AP poll. (#) Tournament seedings in parentheses. W=West. All times are in Mountain time.

== Awards and honors ==
- David Patten – Big Sky Player of the Year, AP Honorable Mention All-American
