= Kiffin =

Kiffin is a name and may refer to:

- Chris Kiffin (born 1982), American football coach
- Irv Kiffin (born 1951), American basketball player
- Lane Kiffin (born 1975), American football coach
- Monte Kiffin (1940–2024), American football coach
- William Kiffin (1616–1701), English Baptist minister

== See also ==
- Kiffin Rockwell (1892–1916), American aviator
