= 2007 Big Sky Conference men's basketball tournament =

- Classification: Division I
- Season: 2006–07
- Teams: 6
- First round site: campus sites
- Semifinals site: Dee Events Center; Ogden, Utah
- Finals site: Dee Events Center; Ogden, Utah
- Champions: Weber State (8th title)
- Winning coach: Randy Rahe (1st title)
- MVP: David Patten (Weber State)

2006–07 Big Sky men's basketball standings
	Conf.				Overall
Team	W		L	PCT	W		L	PCT
Weber State †	11	–	5	.688	20	–	12	.625
Northern Arizona	11	–	5	.688	18	–	12	.600
Montana	10	–	6	.625	17	–	15	.531
Portland State	9	–	7	.563	19	–	13	.594
Montana State	8	–	8	.500	11	–	19	.367
Idaho State	8	–	8	.500	13	–	17	.433
Eastern Washington	8	–	8	.500	15	–	14	.517
Sacramento State	5	–	11	.313	10	–	19	.345
Northern Colorado	2	–	14	.125	4	–	24	.143
† 2007 Big Sky tournament winner Rankings from AP Poll

The 2007 Big Sky Conference men's basketball tournament was a tournament that decided the Big Sky Conference's automatic bid to the 2007 NCAA Division I men's basketball tournament.

First Round; March 4
5	Montana State	71
4	Portland State	96
6	Idaho State	63
3	Montana	70

Re-Seeded Semifinals; March 7
4	Portland State	74
1	Weber State	77
3	Montana	71
2	Northern Arizona	78

Championship; March 8
1	Weber State	88
2	Northern Arizona	80
