= 1994–95 Boise State Broncos men's basketball team =

American college basketball season

1994–95 Boise State Broncos men's basketball
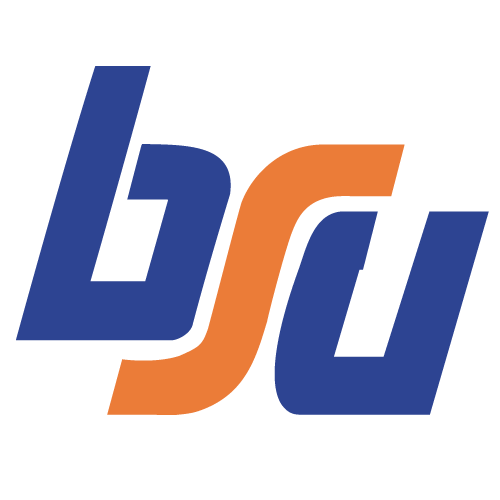
- Conference: Big Sky Conference
- Record: 17–10 (7–7 Big Sky)
- Head coach: Bobby Dye (12th season)
- Assistant coach: Rod Jensen
- Home arena: BSU Pavilion

1994–95 Big Sky men's basketball standings
	Conf.				Overall
Team	W		L	PCT	W		L	PCT
Weber State †	11	–	3	.786	21	–	9	.700
Montana	11	–	3	.786	21	–	9	.700
Montana State	8	–	6	.571	21	–	8	.724
Boise State	7	–	7	.500	17	–	10	.630
Idaho State	7	–	7	.500	18	–	10	.643
Idaho	6	–	8	.429	12	–	15	.444
Northern Arizona	4	–	10	.286	8	–	18	.308
Eastern Washington	2	–	12	.143	6	–	20	.231
† Conference tournament winner

The 1994–95 Boise State Broncos men's basketball team represented Boise State University during the 1994–95 NCAA Division I men's basketball season. The Broncos were led by twelfth-year head coach Bobby Dye and played their home games on campus at the BSU Pavilion in Boise, Idaho.

They finished the regular season at 17–9 overall, with a 7–7 record in the Big Sky Conference, tied for fourth in the standings.

In the conference tournament at Ogden, Utah, the fifth-seeded Broncos were stopped by fourth seed Idaho State by two points in a quarterfinal. Dye retired five months later in August, and longtime assistant Rod Jensen was promoted.

== Postseason results ==
Date time, TV	Rank^{#}	Opponent^{#}	Result	Record	Site (attendance) city, state
Big Sky tournament
Thu, March 9; 8:30 pm	(5)	vs. (4) Idaho State; Quarterfinal	L 63–65	17–10	Dee Events Center (4,395); Ogden, Utah
*Non-conference game. ^{#}Rankings from AP poll. (#) Tournament seedings in parentheses. All times are in Mountain time.
