= 1998–99 Weber State Wildcats men's basketball team =

American college basketball season

1998–99 Weber State Wildcats men's basketball

Big Sky champions

NCAA tournament, second round
- Conference: Big Sky Conference
- Record: 25–8 (13–3 Big Sky)
- Head coach: Ron Abegglen (8th season)
- Assistant coach: Joe Cravens (2nd season)
- Home arena: Dee Events Center

1998–99 Big Sky men's basketball standings
	Conf.				Overall
Team	W		L	PCT	W		L	PCT
Weber State †	13	–	3	.813	25	–	8	.758
Northern Arizona	12	–	4	.750	21	–	8	.724
Portland State	9	–	7	.563	17	–	11	.607
Cal State Northridge	9	–	7	.563	17	–	12	.586
Montana State	9	–	7	.563	16	–	13	.552
Eastern Washington	7	–	9	.438	10	–	17	.370
Montana	6	–	10	.375	13	–	14	.481
Idaho State	4	–	12	.250	6	–	20	.231
Sacramento State	3	–	13	.188	3	–	23	.115
† Conference tournament winner

The 1998–99 Weber State Wildcats men's basketball team represented Weber State College during the 1998–99 NCAA Division I men's basketball season. Members of the Big Sky Conference, the Wildcats were led by eighth-year head coach Ron Abegglen and played their home games on campus at Dee Events Center in Ogden, Utah.

The Wildcats were 22–7 overall in the regular season and 13–3 in conference play to finish atop the regular season conference standings. Weber State hosted the conference tournament, and defeated Montana State and Northern Arizona to receive an automatic bid to the NCAA Tournament. Junior Eddie Gill was named MVP of the conference tournament.

Seeded 14th in the West region, Weber State met No. 3 seed North Carolina in the first round at KeyArena in Seattle. The Wildcats stunned the Tar Heels, winning 76–74 and becoming the first school to win two first-round games in the NCAA Tournament as a No. 14 seed. In the second, Weber State pushed the Florida Gators to OT before losing 82–74.

Junior forward Harold Arceneaux was named Big Sky Player of the Year. Arceneaux would be named conference player of the year for a second time after his senior season (1999–2000).

== Postseason result ==
Date time, TV	Rank^{#}	Opponent^{#}	Result	Record	Site (attendance) city, state
Big Sky tournament
Mar 5, 1999*	(1)	(5) Montana State; Semifinals	W 93–73	23–7	Dee Events Center; Ogden, Utah
Mar 6, 1999*	(1)	(2) Northern Arizona; Championship Game	W 82–75	24–7	Dee Events Center; Ogden, Utah
NCAA tournament
Mar 11, 1999*	(14 W)	vs. (3 W) No. 13 North Carolina; First Round	W 76–74	25–7	KeyArena; Seattle, Washington
Mar 13, 1999*	(14 W)	vs. (6 W) No. 23 Florida; Second Round	L 74–82 ^{OT}	25–8	KeyArena; Seattle, Washington
*Non-conference game. ^{#}Rankings from AP poll. (#) Tournament seedings in parentheses. All times are in Mountain time.
