= David Patten (basketball) =

American basketball player (born 1984)

Personal information
- Born: June 15, 1984 (age 42) Placentia, California, U.S.
- Listed height: 6 ft 8 in (2.03 m)
- Listed weight: 220 lb (100 kg)

Career information
- High school: El Dorado (Placentia, California)
- College: Pepperdine (2002–2003); Weber State (2004–2007)
- NBA draft: 2007: undrafted
- Playing career: 2007–2011
- Position: Power forward
- Number: 24

Career history
- 2007–2008: Cáceres Ciudad del Baloncesto
- 2008–2009: Upstairs Weert
- 2009–2010: Abejas de Guanajuato
- 2010: Boca Juniors
- 2010: Edmonton Energy
- 2010–2011: Abejas de Guanajuato
- 2011: Lechugueros de León

Career highlights
- AP Honorable mention All-American (2007); Big Sky Player of the Year (2007); First-team All-Big Sky (2007); Big Sky tournament MVP (2007)

David Patten (born June 15, 1984) is an American former basketball player and current radio commentator. Patten played college basketball for the Weber State Wildcats and went on to play professionally in several countries.

Patten, a power forward from El Dorado High School in his native Placentia, California. He first committed to Pepperdine University, where he played both basketball and volleyball during the 2002–03 year. He left at the end of the academic year in part to be closer to his ailing mother. He spent a year at Santa Ana College but did not play basketball. He then transferred to Weber State for the 2004–05 season, joining the Wildcats basketball team.

In his sophomore season, Patten suffered a broken foot and missed the majority of the Big Sky Conference season. In his junior year he became one of the team leaders, averaging 10.8 points and 5.1 rebounds as he entered the starting lineup for the Wildcats. In his senior year, Patten became the focal point of the team under first-year coach Randy Rahe. He raised his scoring average to 14.2 points per game and led the Wildcats to the Big Sky regular season crown, earning Big Sky Player of the Year and first-team all-conference honors. Patten capped this off by leading the team to the 2007 Big Sky tournament championship, earning MVP honors at the event and helping the team capture a spot in the 2007 NCAA tournament.

Following his college career, Patten was not selected in the 2007 NBA draft. He signed his first professional deal with Cáceres Ciudad del Baloncesto in Spain for the 2007–08 season. He played in the Netherlands during the 2008–09 season for Upstairs Weert. He split the 2009–10 season in Mexico with Abejas de Guanajuato and Argentina with Boca Juniors. In 2010, he played for the Edmonton Energy of the International Basketball League. He returned to Abejas de Guanajuato for the 2010–11 season and then finished his career with Lechugueros de León, starting with the team for the 2011–12 season but leaving in November 2011.

Following his retirement as a player, Patten moved to Ogden, Utah and became color commentator for Weber State games on the radio.
