= Brekkott Chapman =

American basketball player (born 1996)

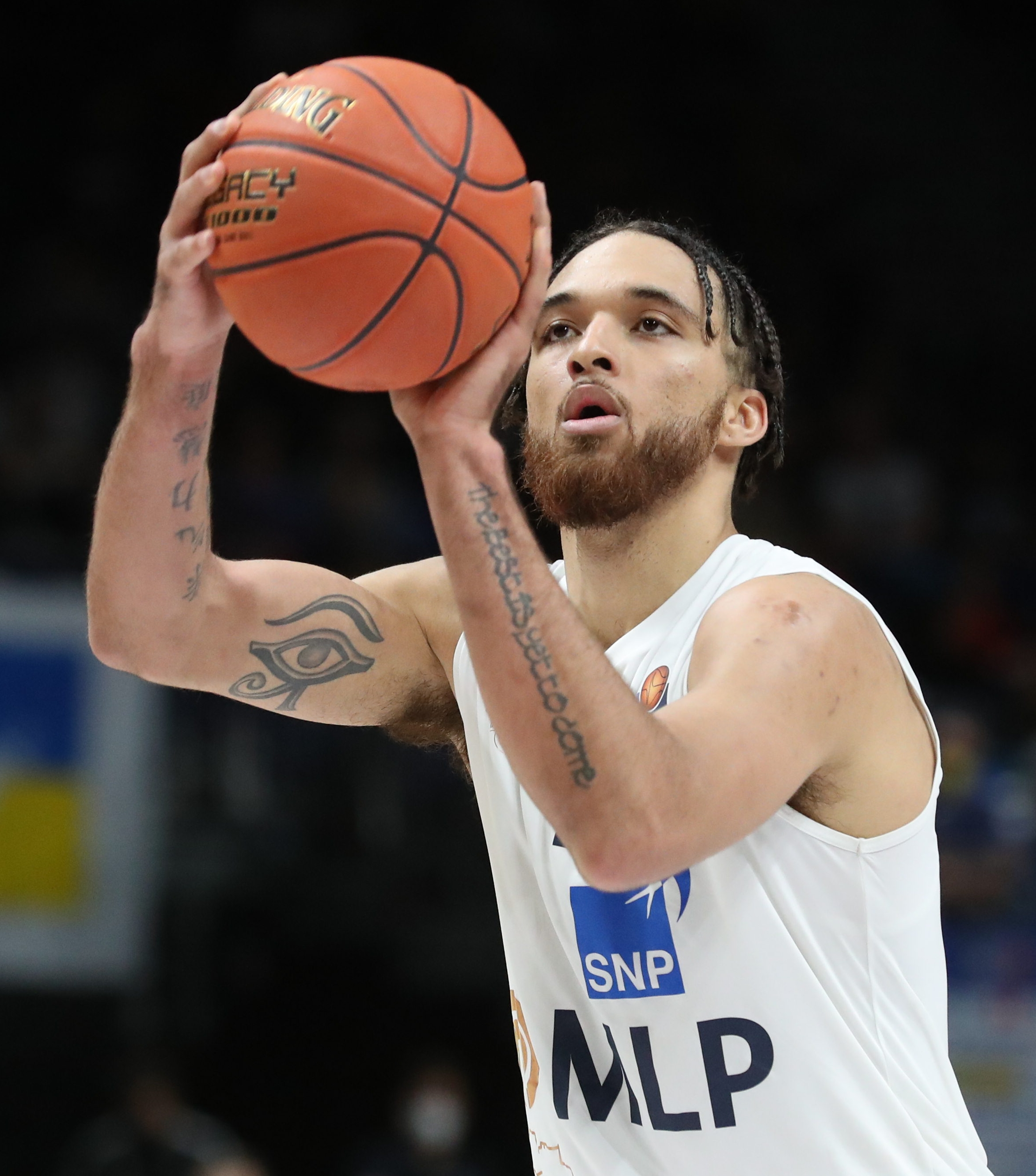

No. 3 – Universo Treviso Basket
- Position: Power forward
- League: Lega Basket Serie A

Personal information
- Born: April 7, 1996 (age 30) Ogden, Utah, U.S.
- Listed height: 6 ft 9 in (2.06 m)
- Listed weight: 214 lb (97 kg)

Career information
- High school: Roy (Roy, Utah)
- College: Utah (2014–2016); Weber State (2017–2019)
- NBA draft: 2019: undrafted
- Playing career: 2019–present

Career history
- 2019–2021: s.Oliver Würzburg
- 2021–2022: MLP Academics Heidelberg
- 2022–2023: Koshigaya Alphas
- 2023–2024: Baskets Oldenburg
- 2024–2025: Kagawa Five Arrows
- 2025–2026: Derthona Basket
- 2026–present: Universo Treviso Basket

Brekkott Chapman (born April 7, 1996) is an American professional basketball player for Universo Treviso Basket of the Italian Lega Basket Serie A (LBA). He played college basketball for Utah and Weber State.

== Early life and high school career ==
Chapman attended Roy High School. As a senior, he averaged 19 points and 8.6 rebounds per game. Chapman scored 16 points in the Florida vs. USA Hardwood Classic. He was heavily recruited, considered the No.49 player in the ESPN 100. On July 29, 2013, Chapman committed to Utah over schools such as Arizona, Gonzaga, UCLA and BYU.

== College career ==
Chapman averaged 5.7 points and 2.3 rebounds per game as a freshman for Utah, shooting 48 percent from the floor. As a sophomore, Chapman averaged 4.4 points and 2.8 rebounds per game. On May 6, 2016, he announced he was transferring from Utah after several meetings with coach Larry Krystkowiak. Chapman was blocked from transferring to all in-state schools except Weber State and almost signed with San Diego. Ultimately, Weber State coach Randy Rahe convinced him to take the scholarship and remain close to home. On November 25, 2017, Chapman scored a career-high 29 points, shooting 7-of-8 three-pointers, in a 105–52 victory over Division II team Black Hills State. He averaged 10.8 points and 5.9 rebounds per game as a junior. As a senior, Chapman averaged 12.5 points and 8.5 rebounds per game. He was named Honorable Mention All-Big Sky. In two seasons at Weber State, Chapman left was tied for fifth alongside teammate Zach Braxton in all-time blocks with 100, and his three-point shooting percentage of 43.1 percent is third all-time behind Dusty Baker and Scott Bamforth.

== Professional career ==
On June 28, 2019, Chapman signed his first professional contract with s.Oliver Würzburg of the German Basketball Bundesliga. He was limited to four games due to a knee injury. Chapman re-signed with the team on July 10, 2020. In early October, he re-injured his knee, requiring surgery and sidelining him at least through November.

On July 13, 2021, Chapman signed a one-year deal with Heidelberg of the Basketball Bundesliga.

On July 18, 2022, Chapman signed with Koshigaya Alphas of the Japanese B.League.

On July 12, 2023, he returned to Germany, signing with Baskets Oldenburg of the Basketball Bundesliga.

On July 2, 2024, Chapman signed with the Kagawa Five Arrows of the B3 League.

On September 15, 2025, he signed with Derthona Basket of the Lega Basket Serie A (LBA).

On June 29, 2026, he signed with Universo Treviso Basket of the Italian Lega Basket Serie A (LBA).

== Personal life ==
Chapman is the son of Kim Littlefield and has a half-brother, Troy. Chapman's father played football at Weber State before moving to Las Vegas to become a boxer. In high school, Chapman worked selling pizza and collecting aluminum cans. In 2017, he believed that he was going to become a father, but it turned out that the child was not his.
