= 1994–95 Weber State Wildcats men's basketball team =

American college basketball season

1994–95 Weber State Wildcats men's basketball

Big Sky champions

NCAA tournament, second round
- Conference: Big Sky Conference
- Record: 21–9 (11–3 Big Sky)
- Head coach: Ron Abegglen (4th season)
- Home arena: Dee Events Center

1994–95 Big Sky men's basketball standings
	Conf.				Overall
Team	W		L	PCT	W		L	PCT
Weber State †	11	–	3	.786	21	–	9	.700
Montana	11	–	3	.786	21	–	9	.700
Montana State	8	–	6	.571	21	–	8	.724
Boise State	7	–	7	.500	17	–	10	.630
Idaho State	7	–	7	.500	18	–	10	.643
Idaho	6	–	8	.429	12	–	15	.444
Northern Arizona	4	–	10	.286	8	–	18	.308
Eastern Washington	2	–	12	.143	6	–	20	.231
† Conference tournament winner

The 1994–95 Weber State Wildcats men's basketball team represented Weber State College during the 1994–95 NCAA Division I men's basketball season. Members of the Big Sky Conference, the Wildcats were led by fourth-year head coach Ron Abegglen and played their home games on campus at Dee Events Center in Ogden, Utah.

The Wildcats were 18–8 overall in the regular season and 11–3 in conference play to finish atop the regular season conference standings. Weber State hosted the conference tournament, and defeated Idaho State and Montana to receive an automatic bid to the NCAA Tournament. Senior shooting guard Ruben Nembhard was named MVP of the conference tournament.

Seeded 14th in the Southeast region, Weber State met No. 3 seed Michigan State in the first round at the Tallahassee-Leon County Civic Center in Tallahassee, Florida. The Wildcats stunned the Spartans, winning 79–72. In the second, Weber State pushed the Georgetown before losing 53–51.

Nembhard was named Big Sky Player of the Year.

== Postseason result ==
Date time, TV	Rank^{#}	Opponent^{#}	Result	Record	Site (attendance) city, state
Big Sky tournament
Mar 10, 1995*	(1)	(4) Idaho State; Semifinals	W 71–65	19–8	Dee Events Center; Ogden, Utah
Mar 11, 1995*	(1)	(2) Montana; Championship Game	W 84–62	20–8	Dee Events Center; Ogden, Utah
NCAA tournament
Mar 17, 1995*	(14 SE)	vs. (3 SE) No. 11 Michigan State; First Round	W 79–72	21–8	Tallahassee-Leon County Civic Center; Tallahassee, Florida
Mar 19, 1995*	(14 SE)	vs. (6 SE) No. 22 Georgetown; Second Round	L 51–53	21–9	Tallahassee-Leon County Civic Center; Tallahassee, Florida
*Non-conference game. ^{#}Rankings from AP poll. (#) Tournament seedings in parentheses. All times are in Mountain time.
