= Shawn William Campbell =

American basketball player (born 1961)

Shawn Campbell
Personal information
- Born: March 18, 1961 (age 65) Boise, Idaho, U.S.
- Listed height: 7 ft 1 in (2.16 m)
- Listed weight: 240 lb (109 kg)

Career information
- High school: Layton (Layton, Utah)
- College: Brigham Young–Idaho (1980–1981); Weber State (1983–1985)
- NBA draft: 1985: 5th round, 102nd overall pick
- Drafted by: Phoenix Suns
- Position: Center
- Number: 31

Career history
- 1985–1986: Florida Stingers

Career highlights
- First-team All-Big Sky (1985)
- Stats at Basketball Reference

Shawn William Campbell (born March 18, 1961) is an American former professional basketball player. He was drafted in 1985 by the Phoenix Suns. He played in college at Weber State University in Ogden, Utah.

== Early years ==
Born in Boise, Idaho to Sonya and Bill Campbell, Campbell's ancestry is Scottish. He attended grade school at Crestview Elementary School before he moved on to Layton High School and graduated in 1979.

== College career ==
He began his college career at Ricks College in Rexburg, Idaho (now Brigham Young University–Idaho) for a single year. After which, he went on a Mission (LDS Church) to Iceland for two years for the Church of Jesus Christ of Latter-day Saints. Upon returning, he had grown nearly two inches, gained nearly 25 pounds, and enrolled at Weber State University in the hopes of seeing time on the court.

During his senior year for the Weber State Wildcats men's basketball in 1984, he certainly saw time on the court. Campbell was the Wildcats leading scorer, averaging 16.9 points per game, 8.0 rebounds per game, and shooting 58% from the field. The Wildcats posted a 20–9 record and Campbell led the Big Sky Conference in blocks.

== NBA draft ==
The Phoenix Suns drafted Campbell in the fifth round (102nd pick) of the 1985 NBA Draft. His draft rights were later renounced in September, 1988.

== Basketball career ==
Campbell's basketball career centered around playing international ball. He played in the FIBA Club World Cup for the Continental-Coors All-Stars (CBA). He also spent time playing for the Florida Suncoast Stingers as well as the VOO Wolves Verviers-Pepinster.
