= Layton High School =

Location
- 440 Wasatch Drive (Lancer Lane); Layton, Utah 84041; United States; 41°03′55″N 111°57′34″W

Information
- Type: Public
- Opened: 1966
- Principal: Brock Jackman
- Staff: 83.44 (FTE)
- Grades: 10-12
- Enrollment: 2,231 (2024–2025)
- Student to teacher ratio: 26.74
- Colors: Navy and Columbia blue
- Nickname: Lancers
- Website: lhs.davis.k12.ut.us

Layton High School is a secondary school located in Layton, Utah, United States. Part of the Davis School District, Layton High School educates students in grades 10 to 12. As of the 2014–2015 school year, 1,743 students were enrolled and actively attending the school.

== Student body ==
Of the 1743 students enrolled in 2014–2015, Layton High had a minority population of 16.5%, and 23.8% of students were economically disadvantaged. Special Education students make up 10% of the student body and the school houses a learning center for students with behavioral disorders.

== Notable alumni ==
- Chuck Ehin - NFL player
- Shawn William Campbell - NBA player
- Christine Cavanaugh - voice actress
- Court McGee - wrestler, professional MMA fighter
- Marcus Kemp - NFL player
- Julian Blackmon - NFL player
- Neleh Dennis - Survivor contestant
- Maurice Turner - former NFL running back
