= Gene Visscher =

American basketball coach (1940–2022)

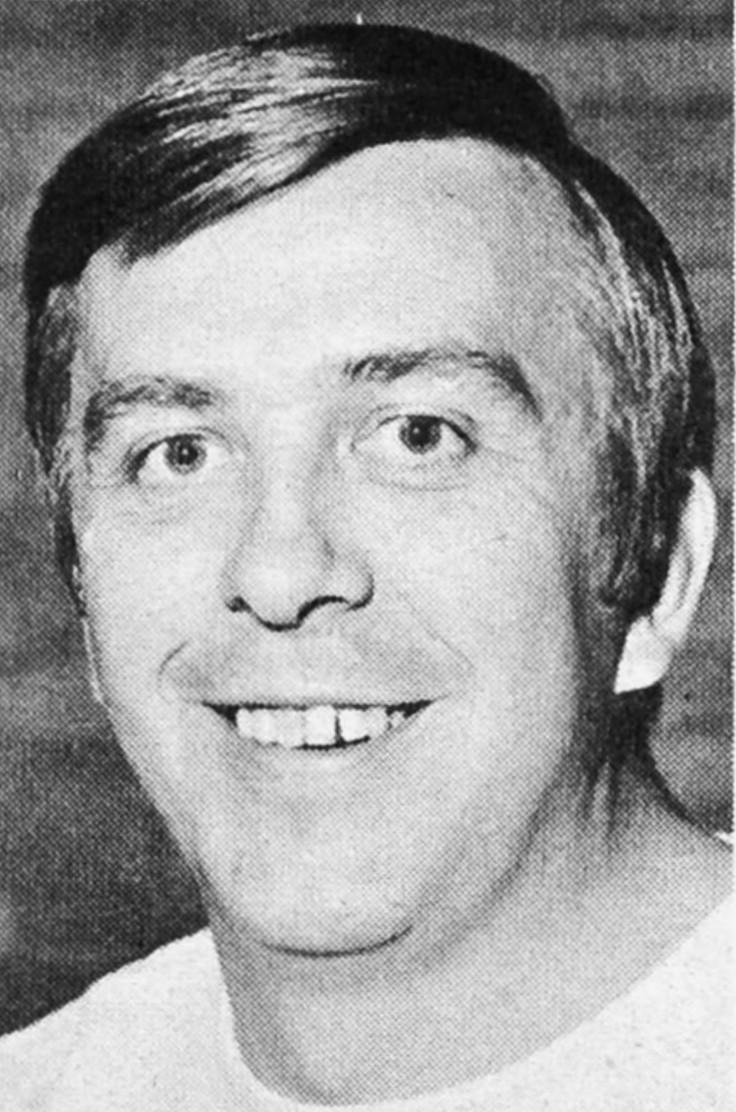
- Visscher in 1972

Biographical details
- Born: November 23, 1940; Muskegon, Michigan, U.S.
- Died: August 6, 2022 (aged 81); Michigan, U.S.

Playing career
- 1964–1966: Weber State

Coaching career (HC unless noted)
- 1968–1971: Weber State (assistant)
- 1971–1974: Weber State
- 1981–1983: Northern Arizona

Head coaching record
- Overall: 74–74

Accomplishments and honors

Championships
- 2 Big Sky regular season (1972, 1973)

Awards
- As coach: 2× Big Sky Coach of the Year (1972, 1973); As player: 2× First-team All-Big Sky (1965, 1966)

Eugene Visscher (November 23, 1940 – August 6, 2022) was an American college basketball coach. He was the head coach at Weber State University from 1971 to 1974 and at Northern Arizona University from 1981 to 1983.

A native of Muskegon, Michigan, he died in Michigan at the age of 81 on August 6, 2022.
