= Willie Sojourner =

American basketball player (1948–2005)

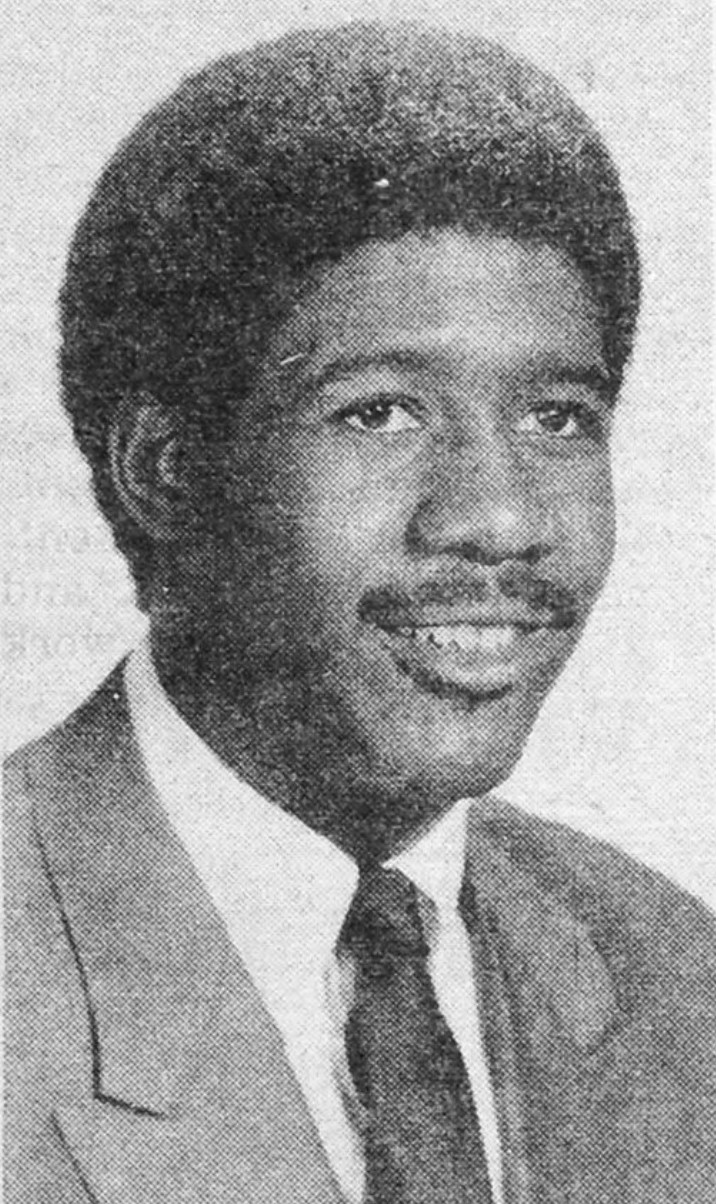

Personal information
- Born: September 10, 1948 Philadelphia, Pennsylvania, U.S.
- Died: October 20, 2005 (aged 57) Rieti, Italy
- Listed height: 6 ft 9 in (2.06 m)
- Listed weight: 225 lb (102 kg)

Career information
- High school: Germantown (Germantown, Pennsylvania)
- College: Weber State (1968–1971)
- NBA draft: 1971: 2nd round, 20th overall pick
- Drafted by: Chicago Bulls
- Playing career: 1971–1983
- Position: Center / power forward
- Number: 35, 40

Career history
- 1971–1973: Virginia Squires
- 1973–1975: New York Nets
- 1975–1976: Lancaster Red Roses
- 1976–1982: AMG Sebastiani Basket Rieti
- 1982–1983: Grifone Perugia

Career highlights
- EBA Playoff/Finals MVP (1976); All-EBA First Team (1976); 3× First-team All-Big Sky (1969–1971); No. 35 retired by Weber State Wildcats
- Stats at Basketball Reference

Willard Leon Sojourner (September 10, 1948 – October 20, 2005) was an American basketball player and international coach. He played collegiately at Weber State University in Ogden, Utah, and had a professional career, winning a championship with the New York Nets and playing overseas.

The Italian arena PalaSojourner was named in his honor. Sojourner is known for giving his friend and teammate Julius Erving his famous "Dr. J." nickname. He is the older brother of NBA player Mike Sojourner.

== Early life ==
Willard Leon Sojourner was born on September 10, 1948, to George and Dorothy Sojourner, one of their eleven children.

Sojourner attended Germantown High School in Philadelphia, Pennsylvania, where he didn't play basketball until his senior year. Until his senior year, Sojourner had concentrated on swimming and track. Eventually, his father and the high school basketball coach both encouraged Willie to give up competitive swimming to concentrate on basketball because of his size. He was a medalist in the backstroke and butterfly in swimming and a talented high jumper in track. Because of his basketball inexperience, Sojourner wasn't highly recruited by colleges.

== College career (1968–71) ==
Recruited to Weber State University by Coach Dick Motta, Sojourner's basketball career at Weber State was record setting. He set Big Sky Conference records in scoring and rebounding, leading the Wildcats to three consecutive Big Sky Conference titles and three straight NCAA Tournament invitations.

He arrived in Ogden, Utah, for the 1967–68 season under Coach Motta. Freshmen were not allowed to play NCAA varsity basketball at that time, so Sojourner played the 1967–1968 season with the Wildcat freshman team.

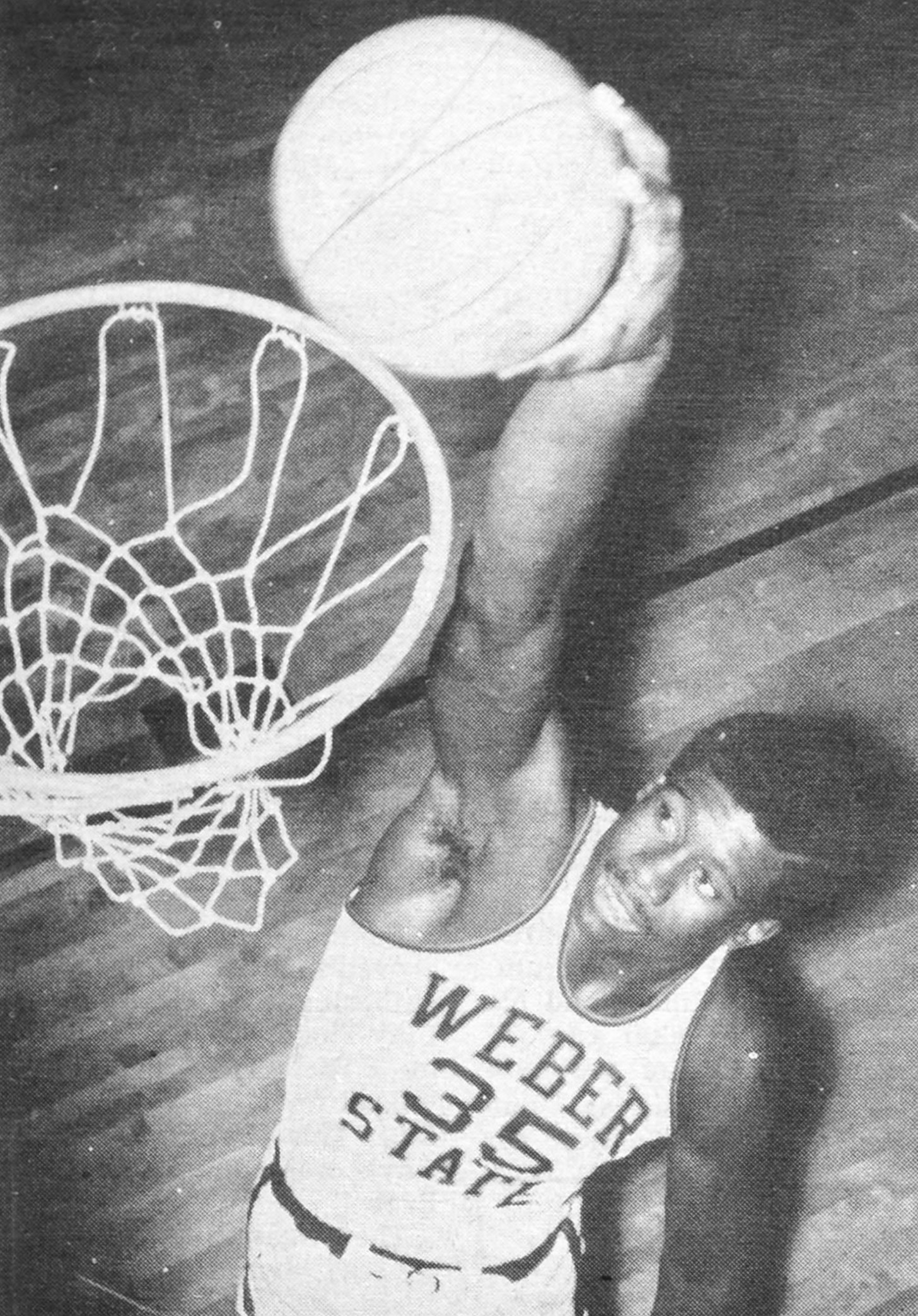
Willie Sojourner, circa 1971

In 1968–1969, as a sophomore, Sojourner averaged 18.9 points and 13.1 rebounds as Weber State finished 27-3 under Coach Phil Johnson, as Dick Motta left Weber to become Head Coach of the Chicago Bulls. The Wildcats captured the Big Sky Conference title and qualified for the 1969 NCAA University Division basketball tournament, where they defeated Seattle 75–73, behind Sojourner's 22 points and 12 rebounds. They lost to Santa Clara 64–59 in overtime in the West Regional semi-final, as Sojourner had 12 points with 18 rebounds. Weber State then defeated New Mexico State in the West Regional third-place game 58–56, as Sojourner had 12 points and 11 rebounds.

In 1969–1970, Sojourner led the Wildcats to the Big Sky Conference title, averaging 21.2 points. Weber State lost in the first round to Long Beach State and Coach Jerry Tarkanian 92–73 in the 1970 NCAA University Division basketball tournament, with Sojourner having 13 points and 9 rebounds.

In his senior season of 1970–1971, Weber State finished 21-6 and earned their third straight Big Sky Conference Championship, led by Sojourner's 17.8 points and 13.6 rebounds. Again, Weber State was matched up against Long Beach State and Coach Tarkanian, losing 77–66 in the first round of the 1971 NCAA University Division basketball tournament. Sojourner had 9 points and 10 rebounds in his final college game.

Overall Sojourner had career totals of 1,563 points and 1,143 rebounds in 81 career games for averages of 19.3 points and 14.1 rebounds. he shot 51.7% from the floor and 72.%1 from the line. His point and rebound totals were Big Sky records at the time. He still ranks second in total rebounds and first in career rebounding average at Weber State, with 14.1 per game.

=== NCAA Track and Field ===
A versatile athlete, Sojourner competed in track and field at Weber State. He placed third in the 1970 NCAA Men's Division I Outdoor Track and Field Championships, with a high jump of 7'0". In doing so, he became Weber State's first NCAA All-American athlete.

== Professional career ==
Sojourner was selected in the second round of the 1971 NBA draft by the Chicago Bulls. He was also selected the Virginia Squires of the American Basketball Association as their 1st Round pick (#8 overall) in the 1971 ABA Draft. Sojourner signed with Virginia and played for the ABA Squires in (1971–1973) and New York Nets (1973–1975).

=== Virginia Squires (1971-1973) ===
As a rookie, Sojourner averaged 6.8 points and 6.1 rebounds for the Squires, playing in all 84 games, alongside teammates Julius Erving and Charlie Scott. Virginia finished 45-39 under Coach Al Bianchi.

In 1972–1973, Sojourner averaged 7.5 points and 5.7 rebounds for the 42-42 Squires. He played alongside Squires rookie George Gervin.

=== New York Nets (1973-1975) ===
In a blockbuster trade, with the Squires franchise struggling, on October 20, 1973, Sojourner was traded to the Nets with Julius Erving for George Carter and cash. Sojourner and Erving were roommates on the road, the best man in each other's weddings and Sojourner dubbed Erving with the nickname "Dr. J".

With Erving starring, and Sojourner contributing 5.6 points and 4.7 rebounds, the Nets finished 55-29 and defeated the Squires (4–1) and Kentucky Colonels (4–0) in the playoffs. Facing the Utah Stars in the ABA Finals, the Nets won the series 4–1 to capture the 1974 ABA Championship under Coach Kevin Loughery.

In 1974–1975, Sojourner averaged 4.6 points and 3.5 rebounds in 79 games as the Nets finished 58–26. The Nets upset by the Spirits of St. Louis in the playoffs. Sojourner was cut by the Nets after the season.

Overall, In his ABA career Sojourner scored 1.968 points (6.0 ppg) with 1,488 rebounds (4.8 rpg) in 309 games.

Sojournor's individual ABA highlights include: six points in his debut on October 15, 1971, vs. Carolina. He had 25 points vs. the Kentucky Colonels on October 27, 1971; 26 points vs. the San Diego Conquistadors on December 2, 1972; 26 points vs. the Carolina Cougars on January 27, 1974; and 18 vs the Denver Nuggets on February 27. 1975. In his last ABA game, he scored 11 in a playoff loss to the Spirits of St. Louis on 4/15/1975.

Sojourner was waived by the Nets at the start of the 1975–76 season. Sojourner had not played much during the preseason and the Nets, who also had centers Swen Nater and Kim Hughes on the roster, chose not to keep three centers.

=== Lancaster Red Roses (1975-1976) ===
Playing for the Lancaster Red Roses of the Eastern Basketball Association (EBA) in 1975–76, Sojourner was the EBA Playoff Most Valuable Player, leading Lancaster to the league title.

=== Italy (1976-1983) ===
==== Sebastiani (1976-1982) ====
In 1976, American scout Richard Percudani scouted Sojourner and his brother Mike Sojourner for the Italian basketball team AMG Sebastiani Basket Rieti. Attilio Pasquetti and Italo Di Fazi, Sebastiani's team and general managers, initially looked to acquire Mike Sojourner, but he had signed with the Atlanta Hawks. They then spoke to Willie, who signed to play in Italy. Sojourner moved to Rieti, in central Italy, and began play in Lega Basket Serie A.

Thanks to rules which greatly restricted transfers of foreign players, Sojourner remained with Sebastiani for six years, until 1982. In his six seasons playing in Rieti, Sojourner gained the nickname of "uncle Willie." He became the leader of Sebastiani, playing with Cliff Meely, Lee Johnson, Irv Kiffin and Tony Zeno among others. Sebastiani played twice in the Scudetto semifinals and twice in the Korać Cup finals. They won the 1979–80 Korać Cup. Sojourner mentored younger players such as Roberto Brunamonti and Domenico Zampolini.

==== Perugia (1982-1983) ====
After leaving the Sebastiani in 1982, Sojourner played one more year in Italy. He joined Perugia's team, playing in the 1982–83 season, before retiring.

Overall, Sojourner scored 4,799 points in Serie A. He is considered to be one of the best American basketball players ever in the Italian league.

== Personal ==
After his Italian retirement, Sojourner returned to the United States.

In 2005, Nuova AMG Sebastiani Basket Rieti (formerly AMG Sebastiani) offered Sojourner their youth team coaching position. Sojourner was unsure and went to Rieti. When he arrived in Rieti on September 15, 2005, he was welcomed warmly by fans and decided to accept the position.

Sojourner was just over a month into the position when, on night of October 19, 2005, he was killed in a car accident. He was returning to his home near Rieti when, due to rain and high speed, he lost control of his car which crashed into a tree.

His funeral took place inside the Palaloniano, Sebastiani's basketball arena, officiated by the bishop of Rieti Delio Lucarelli. Thousands of mourners attended.

One month after his death, Palaloniano was renamed PalaSojourner in his honor. The November 18, 2005 memorial ceremony was attended by Sojourner's family and friend Julius Erving.

== Honors ==
- Sojouner was the 1976 CBA Playoffs Most Valuable Player.
- In 1990, Sojouner was inducted to the Weber State Athletic Hall of Fame.
- The Rieti, Italy arena, where Sojourner had starred, was renamed the PalaSojourner in his honor in 2005.
- In 2013, Sojouner was named to the Big Sky Conference "50 Greatest Male Athletes" in 50 years of the conference.
- Sojouner's #35 jersey was retired by Weber State University in 2015. He became the first Weber State player to have his number retired.
