= 1999 Big Sky Conference men's basketball tournament =

- Classification: Division I
- Season: 1998–99
- Teams: 6
- Site: Dee Events Center; Ogden, UT
- Champions: Weber State (6th title)
- Winning coach: Ron Abegglen (2nd title)
- MVP: Eddie Gill (Weber State)

1998–99 Big Sky men's basketball standings
	Conf.				Overall
Team	W		L	PCT	W		L	PCT
Weber State †	13	–	3	.813	25	–	8	.758
Northern Arizona	12	–	4	.750	21	–	8	.724
Portland State	9	–	7	.563	17	–	11	.607
Cal State Northridge	9	–	7	.563	17	–	12	.586
Montana State	9	–	7	.563	16	–	13	.552
Eastern Washington	7	–	9	.438	10	–	17	.370
Montana	6	–	10	.375	13	–	14	.481
Idaho State	4	–	12	.250	6	–	20	.231
Sacramento State	3	–	13	.188	3	–	23	.115
† Conference tournament winner

The 1999 Big Sky Conference men's basketball tournament was held March 4–6 at the Dee Events Center at Weber State University in Ogden, Utah.

Top-seeded host Weber State defeated defending champion Northern Arizona in the championship game, 82–75, to win their sixth Big Sky tournament title.

== Format ==
No new teams were added and membership remained at nine. After completing its transition to Division I, Portland State was eligible for the Big Sky tournament for the first time.

Similar to the previous year, the top six teams in the regular season conference standings participated in the tournament. The top two earned byes into the semifinals while the remaining four played in the quarterfinals. The lowest remaining seed met the top seed in the semifinals.

== Bracket ==
Quarterfinals; Thursday, March 4
4	Cal State Northridge	90
5	Montana State	91
3	Portland State	80
6	Eastern Washington	74

Semifinals; Friday, March 5
1	Weber State	82
5	Montana State	75
2	Northern Arizona	73
3	Portland State	56

Championship; Saturday, March 6
1	Weber State	82
2	Northern Arizona	75

== NCAA tournament ==
Weber State earned the automatic bid to the NCAA tournament; no other Big Sky members were invited, or to the NIT. Seeded fourteenth in the West regional, the Wildcats upset perennial power North Carolina in the first round in the nightcap in Seattle, which ended after midnight back east. In the second round, Weber State lost in overtime to Florida.

== See also ==
- Big Sky Conference women's basketball tournament
