= Ron Abegglen =

American basketball coach (1937–2018)

Biographical details
- Born: August 19, 1937; Vernal, Utah, U.S.
- Died: December 19, 2018 (aged 81)

Playing career
- 1958–1961: BYU

Coaching career (HC unless noted)
- 1961–1974: Morgan HS
- 1974–1979: Snow JC
- 1979–1986: Alaska Anchorage (assistant)
- 1986–1991: Alaska Anchorage
- 1991–1999: Weber State

Accomplishments and honors

Championships
- 2 Big Sky tournament (1995, 1999); 3 Big Sky regular season (1994, 1995, 1999)

Awards
- GNC Coach of the Year (1988); 3× Big Sky Coach of the Year (1994, 1995, 1999)

Ron Abegglen (August 19, 1937 – December 19, 2018) was a college basketball coach.

== Professional career ==
Abegglen was head coach of the Weber State Wildcats team from 1991 to 1999 and at the University of Alaska-Anchorage Seawolves from 1986 to 1991.

At Weber State, he led the Wildcats to an upset of North Carolina in the first round of the 1999 NCAA Tournament. As of the end of the 2019–20 season, Abegglen is the only coach since the NCAA eliminated first-round byes in 1980 to defeat the Tar Heels in the first round. The Wildcats then pushed Florida to overtime before losing 82–74. Four years earlier, Abegglen's Wildcats, a 14-seed, upset Michigan State 79–72 and came within two points of upsetting Georgetown. The 1995 and 1999 upsets the deepest runs by a Big Sky team since Idaho reached the Sweet 16 in 1982.

In August—just months before the upset of the Tar Heels—Abegglen got in a fight with his then-wife, Nedra, that resulted in Nedra getting a broken wrist. Abegglen was charged with domestic violence. Combined with Weber State already being on NCAA probation after Abegglen was caught giving improper benefits to his players, school president Paul Thompson forced Abegglen to resign at the end of the season regardless of how the Wildcats did on the court. Even after the Wildcats upset North Carolina in the NCAA Tournament, Thompson would not consider allowing Abegglen to return for the 1999–2000 season.

Abegglen is the all-time coaching winning percentage leader of the UAA Seawolves with a lifetime record of 109–45 for a .708 winning percentage. His tenure at UAA was highlighted by a 1989 win over the eventual national champion Michigan Wolverines, 70–66.

He died on December 19, 2018, aged 81.

== Head coaching record ==
Record table
Season	Team	Overall	Conference	Standing	Postseason
Weber State Wildcats (Big Sky Conference) (1991–1999)
1991–92	Weber State	16–13	10–6	T–3rd	
1992–93	Weber State	20–8	10–4	2nd	
1993–94	Weber State	21–9	11–3	T–1st	
1994–95	Weber State	21–9	11–3	T–1st	NCAA Division I Second Round
1995–96	Weber State	20–10	10–4	T–2nd	
1996–97	Weber State	15–13	9–7	T–4th	
1997–98	Weber State	14–13	12–4	2nd	
1998–99	Weber State	25–8	13–3	1st	NCAA Division I Second Round
Weber State:		152–83 (.647)	86–34 (.717)		
Total:		152–83 (.647)			
National champion Postseason invitational champion Conference regular season champion Conference regular season and conference tournament champion Division regular season champion Division regular season and conference tournament champion Conference tournament champion
