= 2016–17 Weber State Wildcats men's basketball team =

American college basketball season

2016–17 Weber State Wildcats men's basketball

Riley Wallace Classic champions

CIT, Second Round
- Conference: Big Sky Conference
- Record: 20–14 (12–6 Big Sky)
- Head coach: Randy Rahe (11th season)
- Assistant coaches: Eric Duft; Garrett Lever; David Marek
- Home arena: Dee Events Center

2016–17 Big Sky men's basketball standings
	Conf.				Overall
Team	W		L	PCT	W		L	PCT
North Dakota †	14	–	4	.778	22	–	10	.688
Eastern Washington	13	–	5	.722	22	–	12	.647
Idaho	12	–	6	.667	19	–	14	.576
Weber State	12	–	6	.667	20	–	14	.588
Montana	11	–	7	.611	16	–	16	.500
Montana State	11	–	7	.611	16	–	16	.500
Sacramento State	9	–	9	.500	13	–	18	.419
Portland State	7	–	11	.389	15	–	16	.484
Northern Colorado*	7	–	11	.389	11	–	18	.379
Northern Arizona	6	–	12	.333	9	–	23	.281
Southern Utah	3	–	15	.167	6	–	27	.182
Idaho State	3	–	15	.167	5	–	26	.161
† Conference tournament winner

The 2016–17 Weber State Wildcats men's basketball team represented Weber State University during the 2016–17 NCAA Division I men's basketball season. The Wildcats were led by 11th-year head coach Randy Rahe and played their home games in the Dee Events Center in Ogden, Utah, as members of the Big Sky Conference. They finished the season 20–14, 12–6 in Big Sky play to finish in a tie for third place. As the No. 3 seed in the Big Sky tournament, they defeated Southern Utah and Eastern Washington before losing in the championship game to North Dakota. They were invited to the CollegeInsider.com Postseason Tournament, where they defeated Cal State Fullerton in the first round to win the Riley Wallace Classic. In the second round, they lost to Texas A&M–Corpus Christi.

== Previous season ==
The Wildcats finished the 2015–16 season 26–9, 15–3 in Big Sky play to win the conference regular season title. They defeated Portland State, North Dakota, and Montana in the Big Sky tournament to earn the conference's automatic bid to the NCAA tournament. As a No. 15 seed in the NCAA Tournament, they lost in the first round to Xavier.

== Offseason ==
=== Departures ===
Name	Number	Pos.	Height	Weight	Year	Hometown	Notes
Hayden Hunter	3	G	5'11"	170	Sophomore	North Richland Hills, TX	Transferred to McLennan CC
Jeremiah Jefferson	15	G	6'2"	185	RS freshman	Dallas, TX	Transferred to Iowa Western CC
J. C. Kennedy	20	G/F	6'4"	175	Sophomore	Nampa, ID	Walk-on; didn't return
Joel Bolomboy	21	F/C	6'9"	235	Senior	Donetsk, Ukraine	Graduated and Drafted by the Utah Jazz in the 2016 NBA draft

=== Incoming transfers ===
Name	Number	Pos.	Height	Weight	Year	Hometown	Notes
Brekkott Chapman	13	F	6'8"	205	Junior	Roy, UT	Transferred from Utah. Under NCAA transfer rules, Champman had to sit out for the 2016–17 season. Had two years of remaining eligibility.

=== 2016 recruiting class ===
There was no recruiting class of 2016.

=== 2017 recruiting class ===
College recruiting (2017)
Name	Hometown	School	Height	Weight	Commit date
Rick Nelson; PG	Houston, TX	Episcopal High School	6 ft 1 in (1.85 m)	170 lb (77 kg)	Aug 1, 2016
Rick Nelson; PG	Recruit ratings: Scout: Rivals: (NR)				
Overall recruit ranking:
Note: In many cases, Scout, Rivals, 247Sports, On3, and ESPN may conflict in their listings of height and weight.; In these cases, the average was taken. ESPN grades are on a 100-point scale.; Sources: "2017 Team Ranking". Rivals.

== Roster ==
2016–17 Weber State Wildcats men's basketball team
Players
Coaches

Pos.	#	Name	Height	Weight	Year	Previous school	Hometown
F	0	Kiko Stavrev	6 ft 7 in (2.01 m)	210 lb (95 kg)	RS Fr	Myerscough	Sofia, Bulgaria
G/F	2	Juwan Williams	6 ft 5 in (1.96 m)	190 lb (86 kg)	So	Travis	Richmond, TX
C	3	Jordan Dallas	6 ft 10 in (2.08 m)	220 lb (100 kg)	So	Long Beach Poly	Long Beach, CA
G	5	Cody John	6 ft 3 in (1.91 m)	190 lb (86 kg)	So	Wasatch Academy	Toronto, ON
G	10	Jerrick Harding	6 ft 1 in (1.85 m)	175 lb (79 kg)	Fr	Southeast	Wichita, KS
F	12	George Darling	6 ft 9 in (2.06 m)	200 lb (91 kg)	Fr	Myerscough	Doncaster, England
F	13	Brekkott Chapman (I) (redshirt)	6 ft 8 in (2.03 m)	215 lb (98 kg)	Jr	Roy; Utah	Roy, UT
G	22	Ryan Richardson	6 ft 4 in (1.93 m)	185 lb (84 kg)	Jr	Dobson	Mesa, AZ
G	23	Richaud Gittens	6 ft 4 in (1.93 m)	200 lb (91 kg)	Sr	Marcos de Niza	Tempe, AZ
G	24	McKay Cannon	6 ft 1 in (1.85 m)	185 lb (84 kg)	So	Highlands Ranch	Highlands Ranch, CO
G/F	25	Dusty Baker	6 ft 4 in (1.93 m)	190 lb (86 kg)	Jr	Tesoro; Saddleback College	Rancho Santa Margarita, CA
G	30	Jeremy Senglin	6 ft 2 in (1.88 m)	195 lb (88 kg)	Sr	Bowie	Arlington, TX
F	35	Kyndahl Hill	6 ft 7 in (2.01 m)	225 lb (102 kg)	Sr	Humble	Humble, TX
F/C	44	Zach Braxton	6 ft 9 in (2.06 m)	250 lb (113 kg)	RS So	Highlands Ranch	Highlands Ranch, CO

Head coach

- Randy Rahe (Buena Vista)

Assistant coach(es)

- Eric Duft (Sterling (KS))
- Garrett Lever (Seattle)
- David Marek (Southern Utah)

Legend

- (C) Team captain
- (S) Suspended
- (I) Ineligible
- (W) Walk-on
- Injured
- Current redshirt

Roster

== Schedule and results ==
Date time, TV	Rank^{#}	Opponent^{#}	Result	Record	Site (attendance) city, state
Exhibition
11/05/2016*; 5:00 pm		Black Hills State	W 88–47		Dee Events Center; Ogden, UT
Non-conference regular season
11/11/2016*; 7:00 pm		Antelope Valley	W 128–65	1–0	Dee Events Center (6,140); Ogden, UT
11/15/2016*; 8:00 pm		at Pepperdine	L 68–69	1–1	Firestone Fieldhouse (1,020); Malibu, CA
11/17/2016*; 8:00 pm, P12N		at Stanford	L 49–67	1–2	Maples Pavilion (1,232); Stanford, CA
11/24/2016*; 10:00 pm, CBSSN		vs. UC Davis; Great Alaska Shootout quarterfinals	W 86–58	2–2	Alaska Airlines Center (2,154); Anchorage, AK
11/25/2016*; 10:00 pm, CBSSN		vs. Iona; Great Alaska Shootout semifinals	L 54–76	2–3	Alaska Airlines Center (2,851); Anchorage, AK
11/26/2016*; 7:30 pm		vs. Buffalo; Great Alaska Shootout 3rd place game	L 72–74	2–4	Alaska Airlines Center (2,851); Anchorage, AK
12/03/2016*; 7:00 pm, KJZZ		Denver	L 55–57	2–5	Dee Events Center (6,167); Ogden, UT
12/07/2016*; 7:00 pm, BYUtv		at BYU; Old Oquirrh Bucket	L 66–77	2–6	Marriott Center (12,859); Provo, UT
12/10/2016*; 7:00 pm		West Coast Baptist	W 107–51	3–6	Dee Events Center (5,725); Ogden, UT
12/17/2016*; 7:00 pm, KJZZ		Utah Valley; Old Oquirrh Bucket	W 93–85	4–6	Dee Events Center (8,212); Ogden, UT
12/21/2016*; 7:00 pm		at Utah State; Old Oquirrh Bucket	W 77–71	5–6	Smith Spectrum (6,270); Logan, UT
Big Sky regular season
12/29/2016; 7:00 pm		at Montana State	W 87–75	6–6 (1–0)	Brick Breeden Fieldhouse (2,586); Bozeman, MT
12/31/2016; 2:00 pm		at Montana	W 84–81 ^{OT}	7–6 (2–0)	Dahlberg Arena (3,710); Missoula, MT
01/07/2017; 7:00 pm		at Idaho State; Suspended (roof leak), rescheduled for 01/25/2017			Holt Arena; Pocatello, ID
01/12/2017; 7:00 pm		Idaho	W 91–66	8–6 (3–0)	Dee Events Center (6,507); Ogden, UT
01/14/2017; 7:00 pm		Eastern Washington	W 70–67	9–6 (4–0)	Dee Events Center (6,678); Ogden, UT
01/19/2017; 6:00 pm		at North Dakota	L 77–83	9–7 (4–1)	Betty Engelstad Sioux Center (2,362); Grand Forks, ND
01/21/2017; 7:00 pm		at Northern Colorado	W 74–69	10–7 (5–1)	Bank of Colorado Arena (1,915); Greeley, CO
01/25/2017; 7:00 pm		at Idaho State	W 85–73	11–7 (6–1)	Reed Gym (1,203); Pocatello, ID
01/27/2017; 7:00 pm		Idaho State	W 96–74	12–7 (7–1)	Dee Events Center (7,018); Ogden, UT
02/02/2017; 7:00 pm, KJZZ		Southern Utah; Old Oquirrh Bucket	W 90–74	13–7 (8–1)	Dee Events Center (6,436); Ogden, UT
02/04/2017; 7:00 pm		Northern Arizona	W 86–80	14–7 (9–1)	Dee Events Center (7,110); Ogden, UT
02/09/2017; 8:00 pm		at Sacramento State	L 74–77	14–8 (9–2)	Hornets Nest (908); Sacramento, CA
02/11/2017; 8:00 pm		at Portland State	W 96–93 ^{OT}	15–9 (10–2)	Peter Stott Center (784); Portland, OR
02/16/2017; 7:00 pm		Northern Colorado	W 69–63	16–8 (11–2)	Dee Events Center (6,641); Ogden, UT
02/18/2017; 7:00 pm		North Dakota	L 68–77	16–9 (11–3)	Dee Events Center (7,658); Ogden, UT
02/23/2017; 7:00 pm		at Eastern Washington	L 72–78	16–10 (11–4)	Reese Court (2,223); Cheney, WA
02/25/2017; 8:00 pm		at Idaho	L 78–83 ^{OT}	16–11 (11–5)	Cowan Spectrum (1,267); Moscow, ID
03/02/2017; 7:00 pm, KJZZ		Montana	L 74–78	16–12 (11–6)	Dee Events Center (6,431); Ogden, UT
03/04/2017; 7:00 pm		Montana State	W 76–67	17–12 (12–6)	Dee Events Center (8,575); Ogden, UT
Big Sky tournament
03/09/2017; 7:05 pm	(3)	vs. (11) Southern Utah; Quarterfinals	W 90–70	18–12	Reno Events Center (1,903); Reno, NV
03/10/2017; 8:05 pm	(3)	vs. (2) Eastern Washington; Semifinals	W 80–72	19–12	Reno Events Center (2,265); Reno, NV
03/11/2017; 6:35 pm, ESPNU	(3)	vs. (1) North Dakota; Championship game	L 89–93 ^{OT}	19–13	Reno Events Center (2,025); Reno, NV
CIT
03/16/2017*; 8:00 pm, Facebook Live		at Cal State Fullerton; First Round; Riley Wallace Classic	W 80–76	20–13	Titan Gym (1,293); Fullerton, CA
03/20/2017*; 7:00 pm, Facebook Live		at Texas A&M–Corpus Christi; Second Round	L 73–82	20–14	American Bank Center (1,116); Corpus Christi, TX
*Non-conference game. ^{#}Rankings from AP Poll. (#) Tournament seedings in parentheses. All times are in Mountain Time.
