= 2007 NCAA Men's Basketball All-Americans =

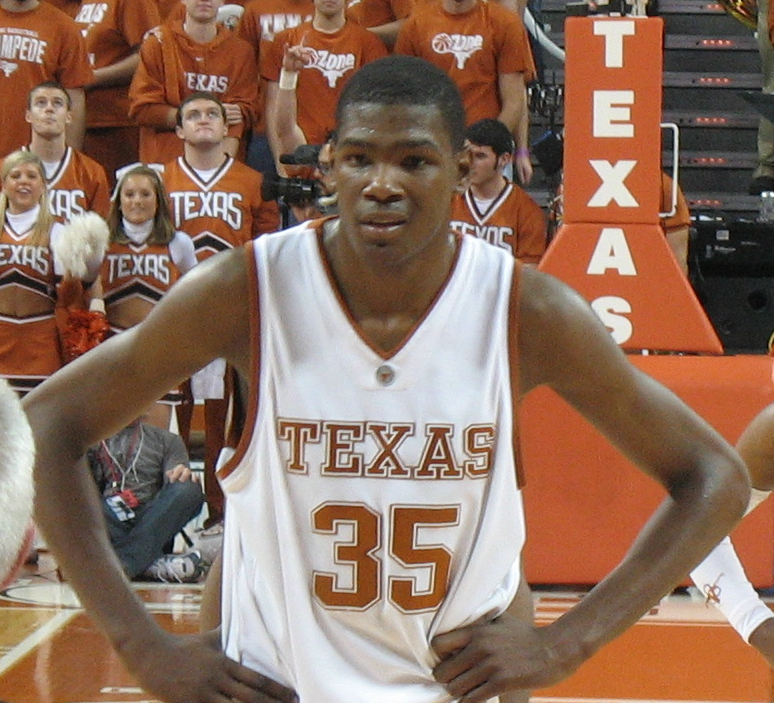
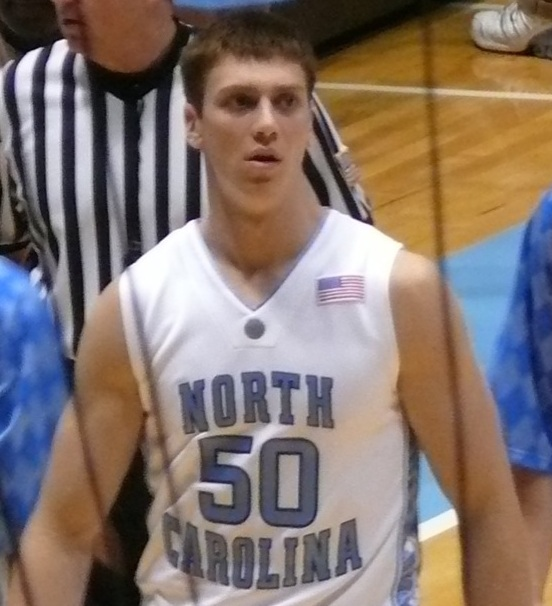
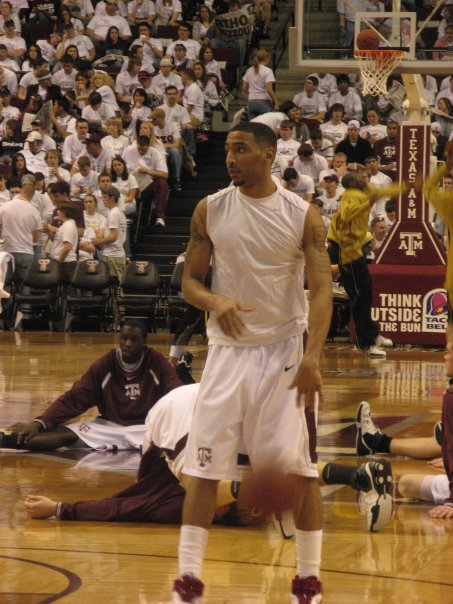
- The 2007 consensus first team. Clockwise from top left: Durant, Hansbrough, and Law (not pictured: Afflalo and Tucker ).
- Awarded for: 2006–07 NCAA Division I men's basketball season

The Consensus 2007 College Basketball All-American team, as determined by aggregating the results of four major All-American teams. To earn "consensus" status, a player must win honors from a majority of the following teams: the Associated Press, the USBWA, The Sporting News and the National Association of Basketball Coaches.

== 2007 Consensus All-America team ==
Consensus First Team
| Player | Position | Class | Team |
|---|---|---|---|
| Arron Afflalo | G | Junior | UCLA |
| Kevin Durant | F | Freshman | Texas |
| Tyler Hansbrough | C | Sophomore | North Carolina |
| Acie Law IV | G | Senior | Texas A&M |
| Alando Tucker | F | Senior | Wisconsin |

Consensus Second Team
| Player | Position | Class | Team |
|---|---|---|---|
| Jared Dudley | F | Senior | Boston College |
| Nick Fazekas | F | Senior | Nevada |
| Chris Lofton | G | Junior | Tennessee |
| Joakim Noah | C-F | Junior | Florida |
| Greg Oden | C | Freshman | Ohio State |

== Individual All-America teams ==
All-America Team
| All-America Team | First team | | Second team | | Third team | |
| All-America Team | Player | School | Player | School | Player | School |
|---|---|---|---|---|---|---|
| Associated Press | Arron Afflalo | UCLA | Jared Dudley | Boston College | Aaron Brooks | Oregon |
| Associated Press | Kevin Durant | Texas | Nick Fazekas | Nevada | Aaron Gray | Pittsburgh |
| Associated Press | Acie Law IV | Texas A&M | Tyler Hansbrough | North Carolina | Jeff Green | Georgetown |
| Associated Press | Greg Oden | Ohio State | Chris Lofton | Tennessee | Al Horford | Florida |
| Associated Press | Alando Tucker | Wisconsin | Joakim Noah | Florida | Al Thornton | Florida State |
| USBWA | Kevin Durant | Texas | Arron Afflalo | UCLA | No third team | |
| USBWA | Nick Fazekas | Nevada | Jared Dudley | Boston College | No third team | |
| USBWA | Tyler Hansbrough | North Carolina | Jeff Green | Georgetown | No third team | |
| USBWA | Acie Law IV | Texas A&M | Joakim Noah | Florida | No third team | |
| USBWA | Alando Tucker | Wisconsin | Greg Oden | Ohio State | No third team | |
| NABC | Arron Afflalo | UCLA | Jared Dudley | Boston College | Aaron Gray | Pittsburgh |
| NABC | Kevin Durant | Texas | Nick Fazekas | Nevada | Jeff Green | Georgetown |
| NABC | Tyler Hansbrough | North Carolina | Al Horford | Florida | Chris Lofton | Tennessee |
| NABC | Acie Law IV | Texas A&M | Joakim Noah | Florida | Sean Singletary | Virginia |
| NABC | Alando Tucker | Wisconsin | Greg Oden | Ohio State | Julian Wright | Kansas |
| Sporting News | Arron Afflalo | UCLA | Aaron Brooks | Oregon | No third team | |
| Sporting News | Kevin Durant | Texas | Jared Dudley | Boston College | No third team | |
| Sporting News | Tyler Hansbrough | North Carolina | Nick Fazekas | Nevada | No third team | |
| Sporting News | Acie Law IV | Texas A&M | Chris Lofton | Tennessee | No third team | |
| Sporting News | Alando Tucker | Wisconsin | Greg Oden | Ohio State | No third team | |

AP Honorable Mention:

- Morris Almond, Rice
- D. J. Augustin, Texas
- Jahsha Bluntt, Delaware State
- Mario Boggan, Oklahoma State
- Corey Brewer, Florida
- Derrick Byars, Vanderbilt
- Jaycee Carroll, Utah State
- Darren Collison, UCLA
- Mike Conley Jr., Ohio State
- Chris Daniels, Texas A&M–CC
- Glen Davis, LSU
- Sean Denison, Santa Clara
- Chris Douglas-Roberts, Memphis
- Zabian Dowdell, Virginia Tech
- A. J. Graves, Butler
- Caleb Green, Oral Roberts
- Taurean Green, Florida
- Adam Haluska, Iowa
- Roy Hibbert, Georgetown
- Kyle Hines, UNC Greensboro
- Ibrahim Jaaber, Penn
- Jarrius Jackson, Texas Tech
- Dominic James, Marquette
- Trey Johnson, Jackson State
- Jared Jordan, Marist
- Stephane Lasme, Massachusetts
- Bo McCalebb, New Orleans
- Javier Mojica, Central Connecticut
- Drew Neitzel, Michigan State
- Demetris Nichols, Syracuse
- Aaron Nixon, Long Beach State
- David Patten, Weber State
- Courtney Pigram, East Tennessee State
- Derek Raivio, Gonzaga
- Drake Reed, Austin Peay
- Arizona Reid, High Point
- Brandon Rush, Kansas
- Keith Simmons, Holy Cross
- Sean Singletary, Virginia
- Loren Stokes, Hofstra
- Rodney Stuckey, Eastern Washington
- Curtis Sumpter, Villanova
- Jamaal Tatum, Southern Illinois
- Romeo Travis, Akron
- Jamar Wilson, Albany
- DaShaun Wood, Wright State
- Julian Wright, Kansas
- Keena Young, BYU
