= Mike Sojourner =

American basketball player (born 1953)

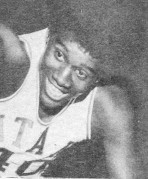

Personal information
- Born: October 16, 1953 (age 73) Germantown, Philadelphia, U.S.
- Listed height: 6 ft 9 in (2.06 m)
- Listed weight: 225 lb (102 kg)

Career information
- High school: Germantown (Germantown, Pennsylvania)
- College: Utah (1972–1974)
- NBA draft: 1974: 1st round, 10th overall pick
- Drafted by: Atlanta Hawks
- Playing career: 1974–1977
- Position: Center / power forward
- Number: 40

Career history
- 1974–1977: Atlanta Hawks

Career highlights
- First-team All-WAC (1974); Second-team All-WAC (1973)

Career NBA statistics
- Points: 1,658 (8.7 ppg)
- Rebounds: 1,237 (6.5 rpg)
- Assists: 172 (0.9 apg)
- Stats at NBA.com
- Stats at Basketball Reference

Michael Sojourner (born October 16, 1953) is a retired American professional basketball player born in Germantown, Pennsylvania.

A 6-foot-9-inch (2.06 m) power forward / center from the University of Utah, Sojourner played three seasons (1974–1977) in the National Basketball Association as a member of the Atlanta Hawks, where he played his entire professional career. He averaged 8.7 points per game over three seasons.

Sojourner was drafted by the Atlanta Hawks in the 1st round (10th overall pick) of the 1974 NBA draft as well as the Denver Rockets in the 3rd round (23rd overall pick) of the 1974 ABA draft.

He is the younger brother of former ABA player Willie Sojourner.

== Career statistics ==
Legend
GP	Games played	GS	Games started	MPG	Minutes per game
FG%	Field goal percentage	3P%	3-point field goal percentage	FT%	Free throw percentage
RPG	Rebounds per game	APG	Assists per game	SPG	Steals per game
BPG	Blocks per game	PPG	Points per game	**Bold**	Career high

=== NBA ===
==== Regular season ====
Year	Team	GP	MPG	FG%	FT%	RPG	APG	SPG	BPG	PPG
1974–75	Atlanta	**73**	**29.2**	**.488**	.651	**8.8**	**1.3**	.5	**.8**	**11.7**
1975–76	Atlanta	67	23.9	.473	.672	6.7	.9	**.6**	.6	8.6
1976–77	Atlanta	51	10.8	.468	**.719**	2.9	.4	.3	.2	4.5
Career		191	22.4	.480	.671	6.5	.9	.5	.6	8.7
