= Bruce Collins (basketball) =

American basketball player (born 1958)

Personal information
- Born: February 8, 1958 (age 68) Rock Springs, Wyoming, U.S.
- Listed height: 6 ft 5 in (1.96 m)
- Listed weight: 190 lb (86 kg)

Career information
- High school: Rock Springs (Rock Springs, Wyoming)
- College: Weber State (1976–1980)
- NBA draft: 1980: 2nd round, 33rd overall pick
- Drafted by: Portland Trail Blazers
- Position: Shooting guard

Career highlights
- 3× First-team All-Big Sky (1978–1980); 3× Big Sky tournament MVP (1978–1980); No. 22 retired by Weber State Wildcats
- Stats at Basketball Reference

Bruce Collins (born February 2, 1958) is an American former collegiate and professional basketball player. Collins was drafted by the Portland Trail Blazers in the second round (33rd pick), of the 1980 NBA draft. Collins played collegiately at Weber State University and is the school's former all-time leading scorer.

== High school career ==
As a senior in 1976, Collins was named the Wyoming 3A MVP, averaging 21.3 points and 15 rebounds a game, leading Rock Springs High School to the state championship. He was voted the MVP of the Wyoming-Montana All-Star game, scoring 27 and 38 points in the two games.

== College career ==
Collins played at Weber State four years from 1976 to 1980, starting all 120 games of his career. Collins earned First Team All-Big Sky honors in three seasons and is Weber State's career leading scorer with 2,019 points and ranks second in scoring in Big Sky history. Collins led the Big Sky in scoring in 1979–80, leading Weber State to Big Sky title, 26–3 record and a national ranking. Overall, Collins won two Big Sky titles and advanced to three NCAA Tournaments.

== Professional career ==
After completing four years at Weber State, Collins was drafted by the Portland Trail Blazers. After being cut, Collins played three years in Asia, including in China and the Philippines.

Collins was a member of a 12-man U.S. squad played games to prepare other teams for the 1984 Olympics. The squad played teams from China, the Philippines, Spain, and Russia, winning 76 of 77 games.

== Awards ==
Bruce Collins' Weber State jersey number 22 was retired on Feb. 13, 2016. Collins joined Willie Sojourner as the only Weber State men's basketball players to have a jersey retired.
