= PalaSojourner =

Basketball arena in Rieti, Italy

Coordinates: 42.4103°N 12.8924°E

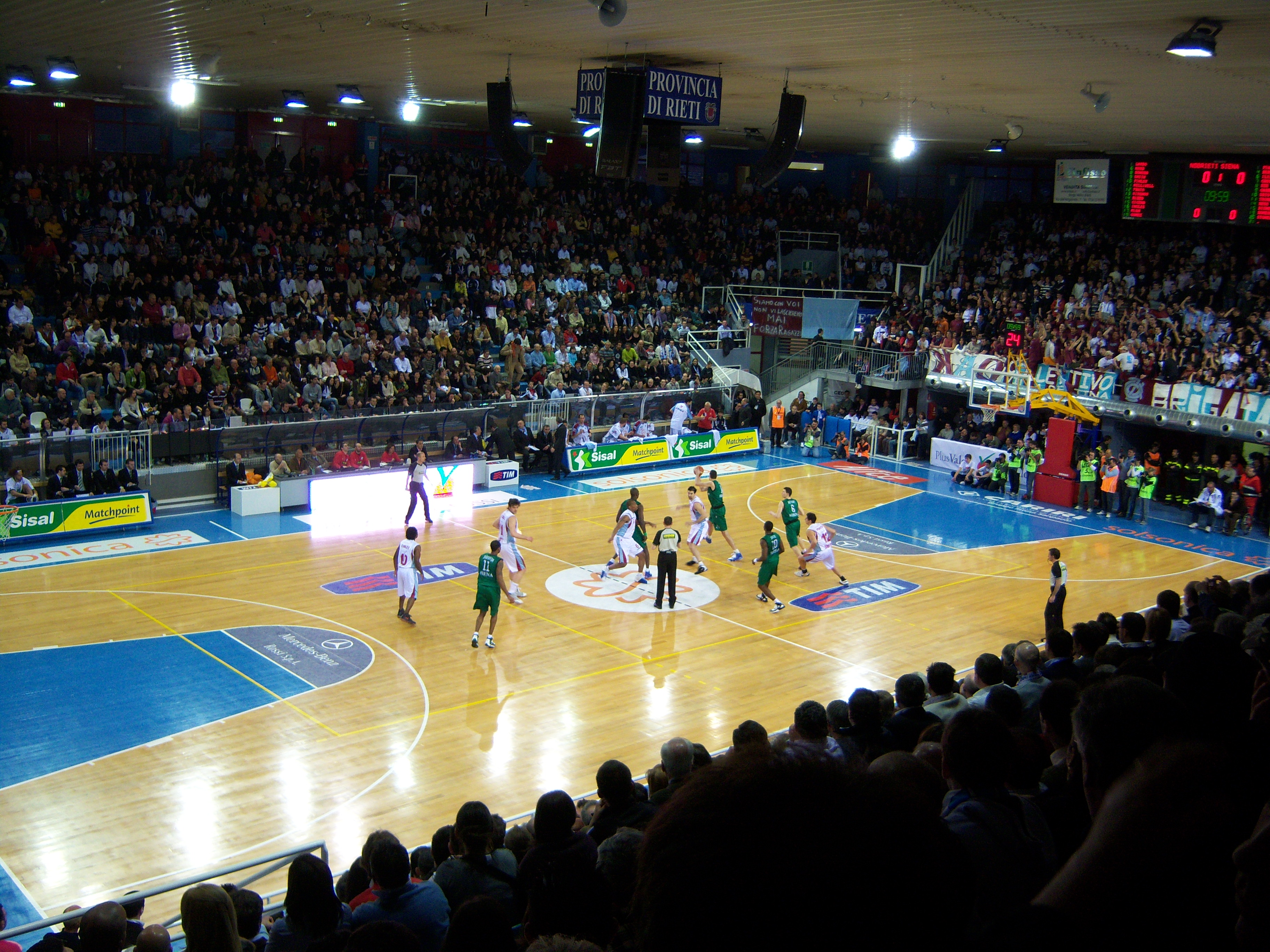
- Interactive map of PalaSojourner
- Location: via Campoloniano, 124 Rieti (RI), Italy
- Owner: Province of Rieti
- Capacity: 3,550 (basketball)

Construction
- Built: 1974
- Opened: 1974

Tenant
- N.P.C. Rieti (2011–present)

PalaSojourner is a basketball indoor sporting arena located in Rieti, Italy. The capacity of the arena is 3,500 people. It was the home of AMG Sebastiani Basket and is currently home of N.P.C. Rieti team. It is named after Willie Sojourner, a star for the Sebastiani in the late 1970s and early 1980s.

From 2015 to 2019, the PalaSojourner—which also occasionally hosts matches of other sports and various types of events—was managed by the Roman sports company Aria Sport. From 2020 to 2022, the facility was managed by N.P.C. Rieti. In August 2023, Sebastiani Rieti won the tender issued by the Province, thus obtaining management of the Rieti arena for a duration of at least six years.

== History ==
During the 1960s, the growing number of spectators becoming interested in basketball in Rieti led to the construction of the city’s first indoor arena: the PalaLeoni on Via dello Sport (now PalaCordoni), inaugurated in 1970 as the home venue of the local team AMG Sebastiani. However, the PalaLeoni had modest dimensions, and hosting Sebastiani’s matches was only part of its purpose, as it had been built primarily as an indoor school gymnasium.

The inadequacy of the structure became evident as early as 1973, when Sebastiani was promoted to Serie A: since the PalaLeoni was not approved for top-division matches (due to insufficient capacity), the team was forced to play its home games at the PalaEur in Rome for the entire 1973–74 season. Despite the urgency of providing Sebastiani with a suitable facility, local authorities were unable to build a new arena due to a lack of funds.

=== Design and construction ===
Therefore, then-president Renato Milardi chose a different approach: instead of waiting for public intervention, he sought to convince the Cassa di Risparmio di Rieti (CA.RI.RI.) to finance the project. While the agreement with the bank was still informal and verbal, a suitable site was identified on land owned by the bank in the suburban area of Campoloniano. To speed up the process, even before final approval and permits were secured, Milardi commissioned the design of the new arena, assigned construction to local companies Giuliano Roversi and Rinaldo Giovannelli, and personally advanced funds to purchase building materials, which were stored on the selected site.

Milardi’s plan still required approval from the bank’s board of directors, and specific exemptions had to be obtained from the municipality of Rieti, since the municipal zoning plan designated the area for the construction of a retirement home. Only thanks to persistent efforts by Milardi and general manager Italo Di Fazi, as well as strong pressure from fans and public opinion, did mayor Pietro Aloisi decide not to oppose the project, and bank president Giustino De Sanctis agreed to assume all construction costs (following an agreement with the basketball club drafted by jurist Rosario Nicolò).

Construction work could finally begin. However, it was not completed in time for the start of the 1974–75 season, and the first rounds were still played at the PalaEur.

The first match at the new arena was played on Sunday, October 27, 1974, during the fifth round of the championship, between Sebastiani (sponsored by Brina) and Siena (sponsored by Sapori), ending 65–62 for the home team. Final preparations had been completed hastily in the preceding days, including the electronic scoreboard (built manually by two local employees of Texas Instruments and only activated the evening before).

=== Operation ===
In its early years, the facility was simply known as Palazzo dello Sport. Around 1980, the name Palaloniano began to be used, coined by then team manager Attilio Pasquetti.

In 1991, due to high management costs, Sebastiani temporarily returned to PalaLeoni, leaving the arena closed and abandoned. The team only returned to the Palaloniano in September 1994.

In 2007, it hosted the LegaDue Italian Cup Final Four, and in 2004 those of Serie B d'Eccellenza.

=== 2007 renovation ===
In the summer of 2007, following the return of Serie A to Rieti, renovation works were carried out to bring the arena up to required standards: new entrances were added, seating was installed on the terraces, the lighting system was upgraded for television requirements, and additional mobile stands were installed above the existing concrete ones. The sound system was also completely renewed, with four large speakers installed under the roof at midcourt. Following these works, capacity increased to 3,550 all-seated places, and an internal video surveillance system was installed.

=== Expansion proposals ===
Before the 2007 renovation, the Province of Rieti launched a European design competition for expanding the arena. The winning project envisioned not only external renovation with glass façades, breathable cladding, and photovoltaic panels on the roof, but also the addition of new tiers above existing stands and behind both baskets, creating a second ring and increasing capacity to 5,840 spectators. Small commercial spaces were also planned inside the structure.

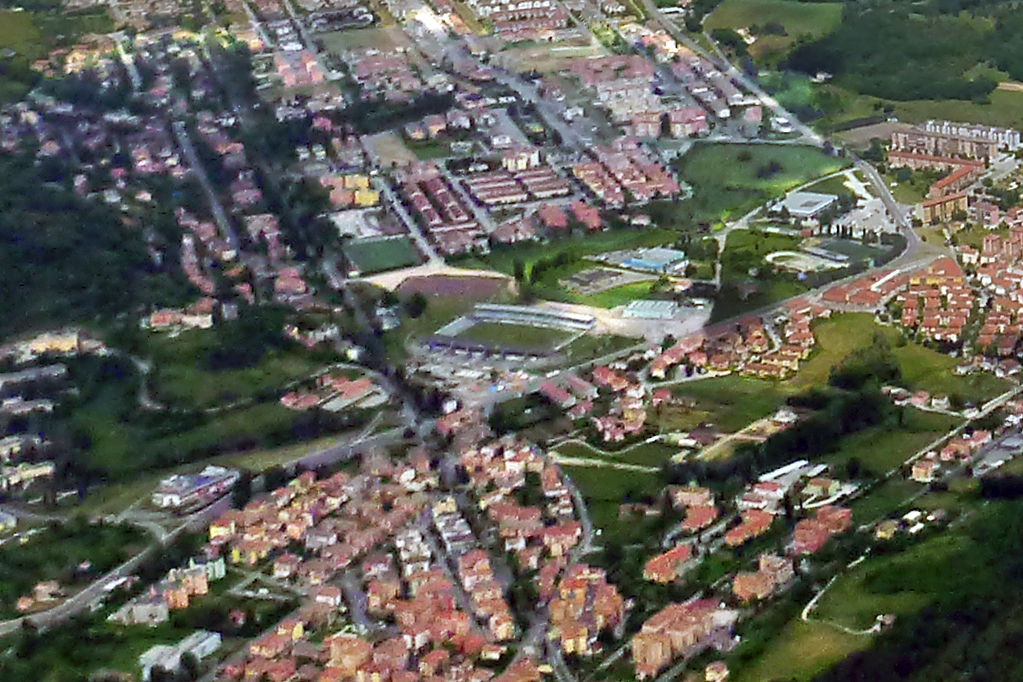
The Campoloniano sports complex seen from above, with the PalaSojourner on the right

=== Later interventions ===
In the 2010 season, the basketball court markings were updated to comply with new regulations (three-point line moved from 6.25 to 6.75 meters, rectangular three-second area instead of trapezoidal, and introduction of the no-charge semicircle). In November 2018, new LED lighting was installed. Between 2020 and 2023, further upgrades were carried out to comply with safety regulations, temporarily rendering the end stands unusable and reducing capacity to 2,964 seats. On September 1, 2023, Real Sebastiani Rieti—having meanwhile won the management tender—announced the full reopening of the end stands, restoring the arena to its full capacity.
