= 1994–95 Idaho Vandals men's basketball team =

American college basketball season

1994–95 Idaho Vandals men's basketball
- Conference: Big Sky Conference
- Record: 12–15 (6–8 Big Sky)
- Head coach: Joe Cravens (2nd season)
- Home arena: Kibbie Dome

1994–95 Big Sky men's basketball standings
	Conf.				Overall
Team	W		L	PCT	W		L	PCT
Weber State †	11	–	3	.786	21	–	9	.700
Montana	11	–	3	.786	21	–	9	.700
Montana State	8	–	6	.571	21	–	8	.724
Boise State	7	–	7	.500	17	–	10	.630
Idaho State	7	–	7	.500	18	–	10	.643
Idaho	6	–	8	.429	12	–	15	.444
Northern Arizona	4	–	10	.286	8	–	18	.308
Eastern Washington	2	–	12	.143	6	–	20	.231
† Conference tournament winner

The 1994–95 Idaho Vandals men's basketball team represented the University of Idaho during the 1994–95 NCAA Division I men's basketball season. Members of the Big Sky Conference, the Vandals were led by second-year head coach Joe Cravens and played their home games on campus at the Kibbie Dome in Moscow, Idaho.

The Vandals were 12–14 overall in the regular season and 6–8 in conference play, sixth in the league standings.

At the conference tournament in Ogden, Utah, the Vandals were defeated by third-seed Montana State in the opening round, the first time since 1986 that Idaho failed to reach the semifinals.

== Postseason results ==
Date time, TV	Rank^{#}	Opponent^{#}	Result	Record	Site (attendance) city, state
Big Sky tournament
Thu, March 9; 5:07 pm	(6)	vs. (3) Montana State; Quarterfinal	L 66–77	12–15	Dee Events Center (4,395); Ogden, Utah
*Non-conference game. (#) Tournament seedings in parentheses. All times are in Pacific time.
