= 1995 Big Sky Conference men's basketball tournament =

- Classification: Division I
- Season: 1994–95
- Teams: 6
- Site: Dee Events Center; Ogden, Utah
- Champions: Weber State (5th title)
- Winning coach: Ron Abegglen (1st title)
- MVP: Ruben Nembhard (Weber State)

1994–95 Big Sky men's basketball standings
	Conf.				Overall
Team	W		L	PCT	W		L	PCT
Weber State †	11	–	3	.786	21	–	9	.700
Montana	11	–	3	.786	21	–	9	.700
Montana State	8	–	6	.571	21	–	8	.724
Boise State	7	–	7	.500	17	–	10	.630
Idaho State	7	–	7	.500	18	–	10	.643
Idaho	6	–	8	.429	12	–	15	.444
Northern Arizona	4	–	10	.286	8	–	18	.308
Eastern Washington	2	–	12	.143	6	–	20	.231
† Conference tournament winner

The 1995 Big Sky Conference men's basketball tournament was the twentieth edition, held March 9–11 at the Dee Events Center at Weber State University in Ogden, Utah.

Top-seeded host Weber State easily defeated second seed Montana in the championship game, 84–62, to clinch their fifth Big Sky tournament title.

== Format ==
Conference membership remained with the same eight teams, and no changes were made to the existing tournament format. The top six teams from the regular season participated, and the top two earned byes into the semifinals. The remaining four played in the quarterfinals, and the top seed met the lowest remaining seed in the semifinals.

== Bracket ==
Quarterfinals; Thursday, March 9
4	Idaho State	65
5	Boise State	63
3	Montana State	77
6	Idaho	66

Semifinals; Friday, March 10
1	Weber State	71
4	Idaho State	65
2	Montana	73
3	Montana State	63

Championship; Saturday, March 11
1	Weber State	84
2	Montana	62

== NCAA tournament ==
Weber State received the automatic bid to the NCAA tournament, and no other Big Sky members were invited. Seeded fourteenth in the Southeast regional, the Wildcats met Michigan State at Tallahassee, Florida. Down by nine at the half, the Wildcats outplayed the Spartans in the second half and won by seven points; it was the first victory for a Big Sky team in the tournament in thirteen years, since Idaho made the Sweet Sixteen in 1982. It was the last game for retiring Spartan head coach Jud Heathcote, who had previously coached in the Big Sky at Montana (1971–76). In the second round on Sunday, Weber State fell by two points at the buzzer to Georgetown and the Wildcats' season ended at 21–9; they had last advanced in the NCAA tournament in 1979.

Runner-up Montana was invited to the NIT, but lost by thirty in the first round at Texas–El Paso.

== See also ==
- Big Sky Conference women's basketball tournament
