= Rod Jensen (basketball) =

American basketball coach (born 1953)

Biographical details
- Born: November 17, 1953 (age 72)
- Education: University of Redlands

Coaching career (HC unless noted)
- 1980–1982: Redlands (men's asst.)
- 1982–1983: Penn State (men's asst.)
- 1983–1995: Boise State (men's asst.)
- 1995–2002: Boise State
- 2002–2004: Virginia (men's asst.)
- 2005–2006: UNC Greensboro (men's asst.)
- 2006–2010: UNC Greensboro (men's assoc. HC)
- 2010–2013: College of Idaho (men's)
- 2013–2014: Washington State (men's asst.)
- 2015–2018: Washington State (women's asst.)
- 2019–2020: Utah State (women's asst.)

Head coaching record
- Overall: 147–134

Rodney Lewis Jensen (born November 16, 1953) is an American basketball coach who was most recently a women's basketball assistant coach for Utah State.

== Coaching career ==
Jensen graduated from the University of Redlands in 1975 with a degree in business administration. He was an assistant coach at Redlands from 1980 to 1982, after which he served as assistant coach at Penn State for the 1982–83 season under Dick Harter.

After being an assistant coach at Boise State under Bobby Dye from 1983 to 1995, Jensen was head coach at Boise State from 1995 to 2002. In seven seasons, Jensen had a 109–93 record at Boise State. During his tenure, Boise State played in three different conferences: the Big Sky Conference in his first season, the Big West Conference from 1996 to 2001, and the Western Athletic Conference in his final season. Boise State won the East Division title in a tie with New Mexico State in the 1998–99 season but never made any postseason tournaments during Jensen's tenure. In March 2002, athletic director Gene Bleymaier fired Jensen, with one year remaining on Jensen's contract.

Jensen was an assistant coach from 2002 to 2004 at Virginia under Pete Gillen. In 2005, he joined Mike Dement's coaching staff at UNC Greensboro. In 2006, Jensen was promoted to associate head coach, a position he would hold until 2010.

After 8 seasons away from the state of Idaho, Jensen became head coach at the College of Idaho, serving from 2010 to 2013. The College of Idaho opted not to renew Jensen's contract after Jensen's third season. Jensen then joined Ken Bone's staff at Washington State for the 2013–14 season.

From 2015 to 2018, Jensen was an assistant coach for Washington State Cougars women's basketball under June Daugherty. In 2019, he became an assistant coach for Utah State Aggies women's basketball under Jerry Finkbeiner.

== Head coaching record ==
Record table
Season	Team	Overall	Conference	Standing	Postseason
Boise State Broncos (Big Sky Conference) (1995–1996)
1995–96	Boise State	15–13	10–4	T–2nd	
Boise State Broncos (Big West Conference) (1996–2001)
1996–97	Boise State	14–13	9–7	4th (East)	
1997–98	Boise State	17–13	9–7	T–3rd (East)	
1998–99	Boise State	21–8	12–4	T–1st (East)	
1999–00	Boise State	12–15	6–10	T–3rd (East)	
2000–01	Boise State	17–14	8–8	T–5th (East)	
Boise State Broncos (Western Athletic Conference) (2001–2002)
2001–02	Boise State	13–17	6–12	7th	
Boise State:		109–93	60–52		
College of Idaho Coyotes (Cascade Collegiate Conference) (2010–2013)
2010–11	College of Idaho	13–7	10–8	5th	
2011–12	College of Idaho	10–20	5–13	8th	
2012–13	College of Idaho	15–14	11–7	T–4th	
College of Idaho:		38–41	26–28		
Total:		147–134			
National champion Postseason invitational champion Conference regular season champion Conference regular season and conference tournament champion Division regular season champion Division regular season and conference tournament champion Conference tournament champion
