= Irv Kiffin =

American basketball player (born 1951)

Personal information
- Born: August 8, 1951 (age 75) New York City, New York, U.S.
- Listed height: 6 ft 9 in (2.06 m)
- Listed weight: 225 lb (102 kg)

Career information
- High school: Springfield Gardens (Queens, New York)
- College: Virginia Union (1969–1970); Oklahoma Baptist (1972–1975)
- NBA draft: 1975: undrafted
- Playing career: 1975–1983
- Position: Small forward
- Number: 21

Career history
- 1975–1979: Athletes in Action
- 1979–1980: San Antonio Spurs
- 1980–1981: Ferrarelle Rieti
- 1981–1982: Limoges
- Stats at NBA.com
- Stats at Basketball Reference

Irvin Alexander Kiffin Jr. (born August 8, 1951) is an American former professional basketball player. He played college basketball for the Virginia Union Panthers and Oklahoma Baptist Bison. Kiffin played one season for the San Antonio Spurs in the National Basketball Association (NBA). He also played in Italy and France.

== Early life ==
Kiffin was raised in Queens, New York. His father, Irvin Kiffin, was born in Jamaica and moved to New York when he was 19. Kiffin has two sisters and a brother.

Kiffin began smoking marijuana and sniffing heroin when he was 12 before he started injecting heroin at 15. Kiffin played basketball on the playgrounds of New York and did not play at an organised level until his senior year of high school.

== College career ==
Kiffin received a scholarship to play for the Virginia Union Panthers. He sold drugs and stole money to support his addiction while his basketball career suffered. Kiffin dropped out of university twice due to his addiction. With the help of his partner in New York, he gave up his drug habit.

Kiffin was noticed by an assistant coach from the Oklahoma Baptist Bison while he was playing in New York and joined the team in 1972. He averaged 18 points and 10 rebounds per game as a senior. Kiffin graduated in 1975 with a degree in physical education.

Kiffin was inducted into the OBU Athletics Hall of Fame in 1987.

== Professional career ==
Kiffin played for Athletes in Action for four years. He received interest from professional teams after his fourth season. Kiffin averaged 13.9 points and 7.6 rebounds per game during his Athletes in Action stint. At the time of his departure, he was Athletes in Action's all-time scoring and rebounding leader.

On August 8, 1979, Kiffin was signed by the Los Angeles Lakers of the National Basketball Association (NBA). On October 6, he was traded to the San Antonio Spurs. At 28, Kiffin was the oldest rookie in the NBA during the 1979–80 season. He appeared in 26 games with the Spurs before he was released. Kiffin attended a free agent camp with the Detroit Pistons in 1980.

Kiffin played overseas in Italy and France until his retirement in 1983.

== National team career ==
Kiffin was a member of the U.S. national team at the 1978 FIBA World Championship.

== Post-playing career ==
Kiffin and his family returned to California after his playing career ended. His first job was for a Californian newspaper where his responsibility was to check on paper boys. Kiffin's parents encouraged him to join them in Pembroke Pines, Florida, where he found a job in Fort Lauderdale at Rogers Middle School as a substitute teacher. He was teaching physical education when he was offered the position of peer counsellor coordinator by the school's principal because "all the kids looked up to him." Kiffin left Rogers Middle School in 1989 to work as the peer counsellor and adviser/advisee co-ordinator at the Walter C. Young Resource Center.

== Personal life ==
Kiffin married Myra in 1972. They had been introduced when a mutual friend brought Kiffin over to get some drugs; she ultimately helped him end his habit. They have two children.

Kiffin became a Christian and was baptised while he attended Oklahoma Baptist University.

== Career statistics ==
Legend
GP	Games played	GS	Games started	MPG	Minutes per game
FG%	Field goal percentage	3P%	3-point field goal percentage	FT%	Free throw percentage
RPG	Rebounds per game	APG	Assists per game	SPG	Steals per game
BPG	Blocks per game	PPG	Points per game	**Bold**	Career high

=== NBA ===
==== Regular season ====
Year	Team	GP	MPG	FG%	3P%	FT%	RPG	APG	SPG	BPG	PPG
1979–80	San Antonio	26	8.2	.333	–	.720	1.5	.7	.4	.1	3.2
