= Dan Sparks (basketball) =

American basketball player and coach

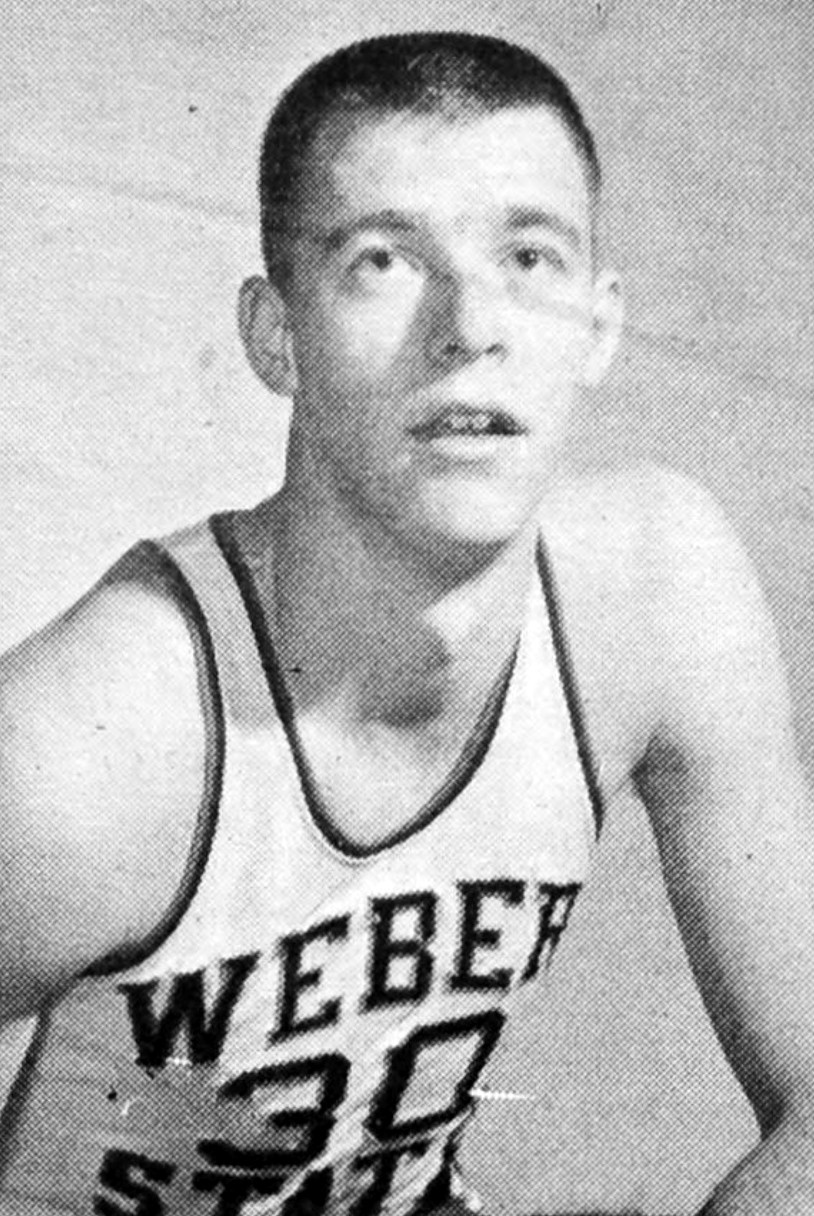

Personal information
- Born: April 17, 1945 (age 81) Bloomington, Indiana, U.S.
- Listed height: 6 ft 8 in (2.03 m)
- Listed weight: 200 lb (91 kg)

Career information
- High school: Bloomington South (Bloomington, Indiana)
- College: Vincennes (1964–1966); Weber State (1966–1968)
- NBA draft: 1968: 4th round, 41st overall pick
- Drafted by: Cincinnati Royals
- Playing career: 1968–1970
- Position: Power forward
- Number: 32
- Coaching career: 1971–2013

Career history

Playing
- 1968–1970: Miami Floridians

Coaching
- 1971–1974: Vincennes (assistant)
- 1974–1978: Kansas City Kings (assistant / scout)
- 1979–2005: Vincennes
- 2005–2006: Northern Colorado (assistant)
- 2006–2013: Wabash Valley

Career highlights
- As player: NJCAA national champion (1965); As coach: NABC National JC Coach of the Year (1986); NJCAA national champion (1972)
- Stats at Basketball Reference

Daniel E. Sparks (born April 17, 1944) is an American former professional basketball player and college coach. He played in the American Basketball Association for the Miami Floridians during the 1968–69 and 1969–70 seasons after a split collegiate career at Vincennes University and Weber State University. Sparks was selected in both the 1968 ABA and NBA drafts by the Miami Floridians and Cincinnati Royals, respectively.

In 2015, Sparks was inducted into the Indiana Basketball Hall of Fame. Although he garnered success as a player, having won the NJCAA national championship at Vincennes in 1965 and having served as Weber State's team MVP during their NCAA Tournament season in 1967–68, he is best known for his coaching career. He coached at the junior college level for 33 seasons, primarily at his alma mater Vincennes, and amassed 869 wins (versus only 247 losses) during his hall of fame career. Sparks coached 25 NJCAA All-Americans and 33 future professional players in his career, including Eric Williams, Shawn Marion, Tyrone Nesby, and Carl Landry. He is the state of Indiana's all-time winningest coach (706 victories) and was the national coach of the year in 1985–86.
