= AMG Sebastiani Basket =

- Founded: 1946
- Folded: 1997
- Arena: PalaSojourner
- Location: Rieti, Lazio, Italy
- Team colors: White, Amaranth purple and Light sky blue
Home	Away

AMG Sebastiani Basket, commonly known as AMG Sebastiani or Sebastiani Rieti was an Italian men's basketball club based in the city of Rieti.

== History ==
Sebastiani Rieti was founded in 1946 by Luigi Padronetti and became active until the 1996–97 season. The club was headed to the memory of Angelo, Mario and Gino Sebastiani, great sportsmen of the time, barbarously killed by the German Army in 1944. Distinguished with amaranth and celestial colors, Sebastiani Rieti played home games in the district of Campoloniano, now known as PalaSojourner.

AMG Sebastiani remained in obscurity for the first few decades of its existence, though it did reach the first division Lega Basket Serie A in 1973. At its first season the premier Division Brina Rieti,.qualified for European competitions of the next season. In the 1974–75 season the club advanced to the semifinals of 1974–75 FIBA Korać Cup, only to be eliminated by FC Barcelona. After finishing the 1975–76 season ranked 12th in the domestic league, the team was downgraded to Serie A2 Basket, although in Europe managed to play at the top 16 group phase of the 1975–76 FIBA Korać Cup.

Two seasons later, Althea Rieti return to serie A1 and also to FIBA Korać Cup. In 1978–79 under the sponsorship name Arrigoni Rieti the club made one of its most successful seasons. In the 1978–79 FIBA Korać Cup qualified automatically to top 16 and ranked first with a record of 5-1 wins in a very competitive group against Inter Slovnaft (2nd, 3-3), Cibona (3rd, 3-3) and Orthez (4th, 1-5). In the semifinals, Arrigoni excluded the Catalans of Cotonificio (95–108 loss in Badalona and 87–63 win in Rieti). In the single final which held on March 20 at Hala Pionir of Belgrade, Arrigoni Rieti lost 98–108 to Partizan. In the Italian league, Arrigoni ranked 6th in the regular season and played with disadvantage in the play-off quarterfinals against the three-peat FIBA European Cup Winners' Cup champions of Gabetti Cantù (ranked 3rd) and qualified with 2-0 wins. In the semifinals Sinudyne Bologna was superior team and eliminated Arrigoni with a score of 2-1 wins.

The following season (1979–80) Arrigoni Rieti had the most successful season ever in the history of the club. In the domestic league ranked 4th in the regular season but in the play-offs eliminated in the quarterfinals by Gabetti Cantù although it had the seat advantage. In the FIBA Korać Cup Arrigoni qualified undefeated from the top 16 group stage (2. Olympiacos, 3. Joventut Freixenet and 4. Tofaş). In the semifinals Arrigoni faced the famous Jugoplastika and qualified hard (1-1 wins) with the aggregate score of 183–179. In the final (March 26, Country Hall du Sart Tilman, Liège), Arrigoni Rieti was found to opposite one more Yugoslav club, the emerging Cibona of Andro Knego, Aleksandar Petrović and Mihovil Nakić, and won the title.

The next two seasons AMG Sebastiani played in the domestic league play-offs until the quarterfinals and in the top 16 group stage of FIBA Korać Cup (In the first case lost the first position and the semi-finals qualification in the tie with Crvena zvezda). In the 1982–83 season Binova Rieti ranked 16th and last in the regular season and downgraded to Serie A2. In serie A2 Rieti stayed for five seasons until 1988 and then downgraded to serie B1. Until the dissolution of the club in 1997, AMG Sebastiani Basket had been moved between serie B1 and serie B2. At the end of the 1996–97 season the deficit becomes unsustainable, new buyers are sought in vain, and a stock exchange is also blurred to acquire the A2 of Pistoia. Deferred by debt, AMG Sebastiani fails to sign up for the championship and end its business after 51 years of history.

== Honours ==
- FIBA Korać Cup

Winners (1): 1979–80
Runners-up (1): 1978–79
Semifinalist (1): 1974–75

== Sponsorship names ==
Throughout the years, due to sponsorship, the club has been known as:

- Snia Rieti (1971-1972)
- Brina Rieti (1972-1977)
- Althea Rieti (1977-1978)
- Arrigoni Rieti (1978-1980)
- Ferrarelle Rieti (1980-1981)
- Acqua Fabia Rieti (1981-1982)
- Binova Cucine Rieti (1982-1983)
- Fonte Cottorella Rieti (1983-1984)
- American Eagle Rieti (1984-1985)
- Ippodromi D'Italia Rieti (1985-1986)
- Corsa Tris Rieti (1986-1987)
- Dentigomma Rieti (1987-1988)
- Air Capitol Rieti (1989-1991)
- Emmezeta Rieti (1992-1997)

== See also ==
- Nuova AMG Sebastiani Basket Rieti
