= Randy Rahe =

American basketball coach (born 1960)

Biographical details
- Born: June 12, 1960 (age 66); Bancroft, Iowa, U.S.

Playing career
- 1978–1982: Buena Vista
- Position: Point guard

Coaching career (HC unless noted)
- 1985–1988: Stratton Senior HS
- 1988–1989: Colorado College (assistant)
- 1989–1990: Colorado (assistant)
- 1990–1991: Denver (assistant)
- 1991–1998: Colorado State (assistant)
- 1998–2004: Utah State (assistant)
- 2004–2006: Utah (assistant)
- 2006–2022: Weber State

Head coaching record
- Overall: 316–191 (college)

Accomplishments and honors

Championships
- 5x Big Sky regular season (2007, 2009, 2010, 2014, 2016); 3x Big Sky tournament (2007, 2014, 2016)

Awards
- 4× Big Sky Coach of the Year (2007, 2009, 2010, 2014)

Randy Michael Rahe (born June 12, 1960) is an American former college basketball coach who was the head men's basketball coach at Weber State University. He was hired on March 23, 2006, as the 9th coach in Weber State's 47-year history. Rahe announced his retirement May 16, 2022 through the University, Rahe came to WSU from the University of Utah where he was an assistant under former coach Ray Giacoletti. Rahe was also an assistant under Stew Morrill for 13 seasons, first at Colorado State University and then at Utah State University. Rahe posted a record of 54–17 as a high school coach in Colorado from 1985 to 1988. He has also been an assistant coach at Colorado College, Colorado and Denver.

Born in Bancroft, Iowa, Rahe graduated from Buena Vista University located in Storm Lake, Iowa in 1982. At BVU he played point guard in basketball and shortstop in baseball.

After completing 6 seasons at Weber State, Rahe has had many accolades: 4 Big Sky Conference MVP players, 5 Post-season tournament appearances, 6 Big Sky post-season tournament appearances, 8 Big Sky All-Conference 1st team performers, 18 Big Sky All-Conference performers, 18 Big Sky Academic All-Conference members, 20 or more wins in four seasons, and a 76% winning percentage in Big Sky games. Rahe also coached Damian Lillard who was drafted #6 in the 1st round of the 2012 NBA draft.

In June 2016, Rahe signed a contract extension good until the 2023-24 season.

On February 13, 2016 vs Portland State, Rahe recorded both his 200th total win and 124th Big Sky Conference win, the latter breaking the Big Sky record previously held by Mick Durham of Montana State. On February 17, 2018 against Sacramento State, Rahe broke Durham's record of most total wins by a Big Sky coach with his 247th win.

After the 2021–22 season, Rahe would retire as the winningest coach in Weber State and Big Sky conference history. He would be succeeded by assistant coach Eric Duft.

== Head coaching record ==
Record table
Season	Team	Overall	Conference	Standing	Postseason
Weber State Wildcats (Big Sky Conference) (2006–2022)
2006–07	Weber State	20–12	11–5	1st	NCAA Division I First Round
2007–08	Weber State	16–14	10–6	3rd	
2008–09	Weber State	21–10	15–1	1st	NIT First Round
2009–10	Weber State	20–11	13–3	1st	NIT First Round
2010–11	Weber State	18–14	11–5	3rd	CBI First Round
2011–12	Weber State	25–7	14–2	2nd	CIT Second Round
2012–13	Weber State	30–7	18–2	2nd	CIT Finals
2013–14	Weber State	19–12	14–6	1st	NCAA Division I First Round
2014–15	Weber State	13–17	8–10	T–7th	
2015–16	Weber State	26–9	15–3	1st	NCAA Division I First Round
2016–17	Weber State	20–14	12–6	T–3rd	CIT Second Round
2017–18	Weber State	20–11	13–5	T–3rd	
2018–19	Weber State	18–15	11–9	T–4th	
2019–20	Weber State	12–20	8–12	T–8th	
2020–21	Weber State	17–6	12–3	2nd	
2021–22	Weber State	21–12	13–7	T–3rd	
Weber State:		316–191 (.623)	198–91 (.685)		
Total:		316–191 (.623)			
National champion Postseason invitational champion Conference regular season champion Conference regular season and conference tournament champion Division regular season champion Division regular season and conference tournament champion Conference tournament champion
