= Harold Arceneaux =

American professional basketball player

Personal information
- Born: April 1, 1977 (age 49) New Orleans, Louisiana, U.S.
- Listed height: 6 ft 6 in (1.98 m)
- Listed weight: 215 lb (98 kg)

Career information
- High school: Booker T. Washington (New Orleans, Louisiana)
- College: Utah State Eastern (1996–1997); Midland (1997–1998); Weber State (1998–2000)
- NBA draft: 2000: undrafted
- Position: Small forward

Career highlights
- 2× Big Sky Player of the Year (1999, 2000); 2× First-team All-Big Sky (1999, 2000)

Harold Arcenaux (born April 1, 1977) is an American former basketball player. He played college basketball at Weber State, and is best known for leading the Wildcats to an upset victory over North Carolina in the 1999 NCAA tournament.

== Early career ==
Born in New Orleans, Louisiana, Arceneaux grew up in the B.W. Cooper housing development. At 6-foot-6-inches and 215 pounds, he was an excellent athlete but struggled academically in high school. Because he did not have suitable academic credentials to play basketball at a four-year university, he enrolled at the College of Eastern Utah (CEU), a junior college in Price, Utah.

== College career ==
As a freshman (1996–97), he led CEU to a 28–5 record and the Scenic West Conference regular-season championship. He averaged 17.3 points and 5.3 rebounds per game, shooting 57.3 percent on field goals and 40.9 percent on three-pointers.

Arceneaux transferred to Midland Junior College in Midland, Texas, for the 1997–98 season. He averaged 17.6 points and 6.0 rebounds per game on 64.3 percent shooting, leading his team to a 26–4 record. For his efforts, he earned NJCAA Second Team All-American honors. He was named Player of the Year in Region Five and in the Western Junior College Athletic Conference.

=== Weber State ===
Having completed two years of junior college basketball, Arceneaux transferred to Weber State in Ogden, Utah, to play for Guy Beach (an assistant coach at Weber State who had been the head coach for Arceneaux at CEU). As a junior (1998–99), Arceneaux teamed with Eddie Gill to lead the Wildcats to one of the most successful seasons in school history. With Arceneaux leading the way, Weber State won the Big Sky Conference championship and earned an invitation to the NCAA Tournament.

The Wildcats faced perennial powerhouse North Carolina in the first round of the tournament. North Carolina was making its 25th consecutive appearance in the NCAA Tournament and had won every first-round game since 1980. The Wildcats were heavy underdogs against the Tar Heels.

Weber State controlled the game, leading for most of the second half. Arceneaux scored from everywhere on the floor and finished with 36 points (20 in the second half). Weber State led by 10 points with 3:59 minutes left in the game, but North Carolina fought back to make it close. Arceneaux made a pair of free throws with 13.3 seconds left, and then intercepted a North Carolina pass as time expired to preserve a 76–74 victory for the Wildcats. Weber State's win over mighty UNC remains one of the biggest upsets in NCAA Tournament history, and Arceneaux's spectacular performance made him a national star.

Weber State faced Florida in the second round. Again playing as underdogs, the Wildcats gave the Gators all they could handle. Once again, Arceneaux carried the team. He scored 32 points, but he did struggle somewhat in the second half. Weber State played well enough to send the game into overtime at 68–68, but Florida pulled away and won in OT, 82–74. The loss ended Weber State's tournament run, but it was enough to secure national respect for the little-known school.

Arceneaux finished the season with a school record of 713 points. He averaged 22.3 points, 6.0 rebounds, and 1.7 steals per game, and was named Big Sky Player of the Year. He set a school record by scoring 30 points or more in six games during the season, including a 39-point performance against Eastern Washington. He also set an unofficial school record with 49 dunks during the season.

With the national spotlight shining on him, Arceneaux considered skipping his senior season at Weber State in pursuit of a career in the NBA. Arceneaux initially declared himself eligible for the draft, but he ultimately decided to return to Weber State for one more season.

With a new head coach and several new players, Weber State struggled during Arceneaux's senior year (1999–2000). The Wildcats finished with a respectable 18–10 record but did not return to the NCAA Tournament. In the first eight games of the season, Arceneaux averaged just 14 points per contest as opponents' defenses concentrated on him. As the season went on, he adjusted his playing style, and his statistics soared. He scored 27 ppg in conference play, finished with a season average of 23 ppg (good for fifth in the nation), and added 7.4 rpg. He finished his collegiate career in spectacular fashion, averaging 39.5 points and 14.5 rebounds in the last two games of his career (against Montana State and Eastern Washington).

== Professional career ==
Despite his success at Weber State, Arceneaux was not drafted by an NBA team, and played for various organizations at home and abroad since leaving college, including professional teams in Argentina, Australia, France, Portugal, the Philippines, Venezuela and Mexico.

He played in the 2000 Rocky Mountain Revue with the Utah Jazz, but did not receive a contract offer from the team. After that, he had short stints with the Richmond Rhythm of the IBL and the Columbus Riverdragons of the NBDL. He returned to the United States for the 2004–05 season, signing with the Utah Snowbears of the American Basketball Association. Arceneaux scored 42 points in Utah's 130–115 playoff victory over the Long Beach Jam, which ultimately proved to be the franchise's final game. He was named to the USBasket.com All-ABA team that season.

Arceneaux went back to Venezuela to play for Marinos de Anzoategui. He averaged 15.5 points per game and shot 60.0 percent from the floor, leading his team to the 2005 Venezuelan LBP regular season championship and playoff championship. He was also named MVP of the league All-Star Game. He also played for the Marinos for part of 2006.

He returned to Utah for the 2006–07 season as a member of the Utah Eagles of the Continental Basketball Association. Arceneaux averaged 19.8 points per game, but the Eagles struggled to a 6–18 record before the franchise ceased operations.

As of September 2009, Arceneaux was with Lechugueros de León in Mexico. In November 2010, he was transferred to the team Club Atlético Quilmes (Mar del Plata).

== Personal life ==
Arceneaux is vice president of From The Ground Up Records, whose artists include Mullage (Trick'n), Mr. Magic and The Boyz Next Door featuring Jamie Ray.
