= Weber State Wildcats men's basketball =

Basketball team representing Weber State University

2026–27 Weber State Wildcats men's basketball team
- University: Weber State University
- First season: 1962
- Head coach: Kaleb Canales (1st season)
- Location: Ogden, Utah
- Arena: Dee Events Center (capacity: 11,592)
- Conference: Big Sky
- Nickname: Wildcats
- Colors: Purple and white
- All-time record: 1,139–696 (.621)

NCAA Division I tournament Sweet Sixteen
- 1969, 1972

NCAA Division I tournament appearances
- 1968, 1969, 1970, 1971, 1972, 1973, 1978, 1979, 1980, 1983, 1995, 1999, 2003, 2007, 2014, 2016

Conference tournament champions
- 1978, 1979, 1980, 1983, 1995, 1999, 2003, 2007, 2014, 2016

Conference regular-season champions
- 1965, 1966, 1968, 1969, 1970, 1971, 1972, 1973, 1976, 1979, 1980, 1983, 1984, 1994, 1995, 1999, 2003, 2007, 2009, 2010, 2014, 2016

Uniforms
Home	Away	Alternate

The Weber State Wildcats men's basketball team is the basketball team representing Weber State University in Ogden, Utah. The program is classified in the NCAA Division I and is a member of the Big Sky Conference. The team last played in the NCAA Division I men's basketball tournament in 2016. The Wildcats are currently coached by Kaleb Canales.

Street & Smith ranked Weber State 51st in its 2005 list of the 100 greatest college basketball programs of all time, while Jeff Sagarin placed the program 116th in his 2009 all-time rankings in the ESPN College Basketball Encyclopedia.

With a winning percentage of .630, the Wildcats have the 29th highest winning percentage in Division I college basketball through the end of the 2022–23 season.

Weber State Wildcats basketball games are broadcast on KLO-FM The Wave 103.1 with commentary provided by "The Voice of the Wildcats" Carl Arky and David Patten.

Home games are available on ESPN+ with Tony Parks or Ethan Jordan providing play-by-play and former Wildcats head coach Joe Cravens providing color commentary.

== Season-by-season records ==
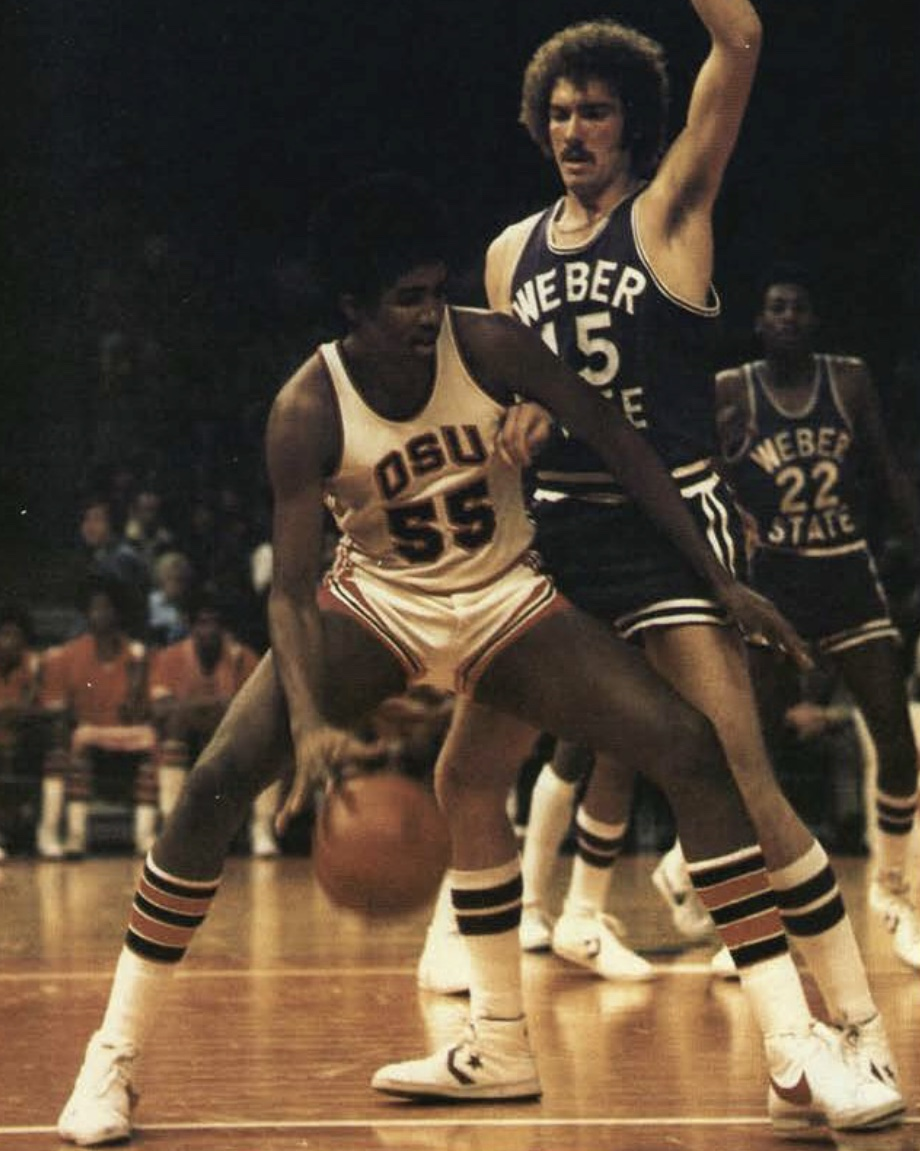
Weber v OSU game in 1976–77 season

Record table
Season	Coach	Overall	Conference	Standing	Postseason
Dick Motta (Big Sky) (1962–1968)
1962–63	Dick Motta	22–4			
1963–64	Dick Motta	17–8	7–3	2nd	
1964–65	Dick Motta	22–3	8–2	1st	
1965–66	Dick Motta	20–5	8–2	T–1st	
1966–67	Dick Motta	18–7	5–5	T–3rd	
1967–68	Dick Motta	21–6	12–3	1st	NCAA First Round
Dick Motta:		120–33 (.784)	40–15 (.727)		
Phil Johnson (Big Sky) (1968–1971)
1968–69	Phil Johnson	27–3	15–0	1st	NCAA West Regionals
1969–70	Phil Johnson	20–7	12–3	1st	NCAA First Round
1970–71	Phil Johnson	21–6	12–2	1st	NCAA First Round
Phil Johnson:		68–16 (.810)	39–5 (.886)		
Gene Visscher (Big Sky) (1971–1975)
1971–72	Gene Visscher	18–11	10–4	1st	NCAA West Regionals
1972–73	Gene Visscher	20–7	13–1	1st	NCAA First Round
1973–74	Gene Visscher	14–12	8–6	3rd	
1974–75	Gene Visscher	5–8	1–2		
Gene Visscher:		57–38 (.600)	32–12 (.727)		
Neil McCarthy (Big Sky) (1975–1985)
1974–75	Neil McCarthy	6–7 (11–15)	5–6 (6–8)	5th	
1975–76	Neil McCarthy	21–11	9–5	T–1st	
1976–77	Neil McCarthy	20–8	11–3	2nd	
1977–78	Neil McCarthy	19–10	9–5	3rd	NCAA 1st Round
1978–79	Neil McCarthy	25–9	10–4	1st	NCAA 2nd Round
1979–80	Neil McCarthy	26–3	13–1	1st	NCAA 1st Round
1980–81	Neil McCarthy	8–19	5–9	T–5th	
1981–82	Neil McCarthy	15–13	6–8	T–4th	
1982–83	Neil McCarthy	23–8	10–4	T–1st	NCAA 1st Round
1983–84	Neil McCarthy	23–8	12–2	1st	NIT 2nd Round
1984–85	Neil McCarthy	20–9	9–5	3rd	
Neil McCarthy:		206–105 (.662)	99–52 (.656)		
Larry Farmer (Big Sky) (1985–1988)
1985–86	Larry Farmer	18–11	7–7	T–4th	
1986–87	Larry Farmer	7–22	4–10	8th	
1987–88	Larry Farmer	9–21	6–10	8th	
Larry Farmer:		34–54 (.386)	17–27 (.386)		
Denny Huston (Big Sky) (1988–1991)
1988–89	Denny Huston	17–11	9–7	5th	
1989–90	Denny Huston	14–15	8–8	T–5th	
1990–91	Denny Huston	12–16	7–9	T–5th	
Denny Huston:		43–42 (.506)	25–24 (.510)		
Ron Abegglen (Big Sky) (1991–1999)
1991–92	Ron Abegglen	16–13	10–6	T–3rd	
1992–93	Ron Abegglen	20–8	10–4	2nd	
1993–94	Ron Abegglen	21–9	11–3	T–1st	
1994–95	Ron Abegglen	21–9	11–3	T–1st	NCAA Round of 32
1995–96	Ron Abegglen	20–10	10–4	T–2nd	
1996–97	Ron Abegglen	15–13	9–7	T–4th	
1997–98	Ron Abegglen	14–13	12–4	2nd	
1998–99	Ron Abegglen	25–8	13–3	1st	NCAA Round of 32
Ron Abegglen:		152–83 (.647)	86–34 (.717)		
Joe Cravens (Big Sky) (1999–2006)
1999-00	Joe Cravens	18–10	10–6	T–4th	
2000–01	Joe Cravens	15–14	8–8	T–4th	
2001–02	Joe Cravens	18–11	8–6	3rd	
2002–03	Joe Cravens	26–6	14–0	1st	NCAA First Round
2003–04	Joe Cravens	15–14	7–7	2nd	
2004–05	Joe Cravens	14–16	7–7	5th	
2005–06	Joe Cravens	10–17	4–10	T–7th	
Joe Cravens:		116–88 (.569)	58–44 (.569)		
Randy Rahe (Big Sky) (2006–2022)
2006–07	Randy Rahe	20–12	11–5	1st	NCAA first round
2007–08	Randy Rahe	16–14	10–6	3rd	
2008–09	Randy Rahe	21–10	15–1	1st	NIT first round
2009–10	Randy Rahe	20–11	13–3	1st	NIT first round
2010–11	Randy Rahe	18–14	11–5	3rd	CBI first round
2011–12	Randy Rahe	25–7	14–2	2nd	CIT second round
2012–13	Randy Rahe	30–7	18–2	2nd	CIT Finals
2013–14	Randy Rahe	19–12	14–6	1st	NCAA first round
2014–15	Randy Rahe	13–17	8–10	T–7th	
2015–16	Randy Rahe	26–9	15–3	1st	NCAA first round
2016–17	Randy Rahe	20–14	12–6	T–3rd	CIT second round
2017–18	Randy Rahe	20–11	13–5	T–3rd	
2018–19	Randy Rahe	18–15	11–9	T–4th	
2019–20	Randy Rahe	12–20	8–12	T–8th	
2020–21	Randy Rahe	17–6	12–3	T–2nd	
2021–22	Randy Rahe	21–12	13–7	T–3rd	
Randy Rahe:		316–191 (.623)	198–85 (.700)		
Eric Duft (Big Sky) (2022–present)
2022–23	Eric Duft	18–15	12–6	3rd	
2023–24	Eric Duft	20–12	11–7	4th	
2024–25	Eric Duft	12–22	5–13	9th	
Eric Duft:		50–49 (.505)	28–26 (.519)		
Total:		1,139–696 (.621)			
National champion Postseason invitational champion Conference regular season champion Conference regular season and conference tournament champion Division regular season champion Division regular season and conference tournament champion Conference tournament champion

Updated through end of 2024–25 season

== Postseason ==
=== NCAA tournament results ===
The Wildcats have appeared in 16 NCAA Tournaments, with a combined record of 6–17. Two of those wins are among the biggest upsets in NCAA Tournament history. In 1995, No. 14-seeded Weber State upset third-seeded Michigan State.

In 1999, led by Harold Arceneaux, the Wildcats, again a No. 14 seed, faced perennial powerhouse North Carolina in the first round in Seattle. North Carolina was making its 25th consecutive NCAA appearance and had been to the Final Four two years in a row. The Wildcats were heavy underdogs against the Tar Heels, but controlled the game, leading for most of the second half. North Carolina had no answer for Arceneaux, who scored from everywhere on the floor and finished with 36 points (20 in the second half). Weber State led by 10 points with 3:59 left in the game, and went on to win 76–74. They were the first team to defeat the Tar Heels in the first round since first-round byes were eliminated in 1985. The Wildcats pushed Florida to overtime in the second round before losing 82–74. These were the deepest tournament runs by a Big Sky team since Idaho advanced to the Sweet 16 in 1982.

Year	Seed	Round	Opponent	Result
1968		Round of 23	New Mexico State	L 57–68
1969		Round of 25; Sweet Sixteen; Regional third place	Seattle; Santa Clara; New Mexico State	W 75–73; L 59–63^{OT} W 58–56
1970		Round of 25	Long Beach State	L 73–92
1971		Round of 25	Long Beach State	L 66–77
1972		Round of 25; Sweet Sixteen; Regional third place	Hawaiʻi; No. 1 UCLA; San Francisco	W 91–64; L 58–90; L 64–74
1973		Round of 25	Long Beach State	L 75–88
1978		Round of 32	Arkansas	L 52–73
1979	No. 7 MW	Round of 40; Round of 32	No. 10 New Mexico State; No. 2 Arkansas	W 81–78^{OT} L 63–74
1980	No. 7 W	Round of 48	No. 10 Lamar	L 86–87
1983	No. 9 W	Round of 48	No. 8 Washington State	L 52–62
1995	No. 14 S	Round of 64; Round of 32	No. 3 Michigan State; No. 6 Georgetown	W 79–72; L 51–53
1999	No. 14 W	Round of 64; Round of 32	No. 3 North Carolina; No. 6 Florida	W 76–74; L 74–82^{OT}
2003	No. 12 M	Round of 64	No. 5 Wisconsin	L 74–81
2007	No. 15 W	Round of 64	No. 2 UCLA	L 42–70
2014	No. 16 W	Round of 64	No. 1 Arizona	L 59–68
2016	No. 15 E	Round of 64	No. 2 Xavier	L 53–71

=== NIT results ===
The Wildcats have appeared in three National Invitation Tournaments (NIT), with a combined record of 1–3.

Year	Round	Opponent	Result
1984	First Round; Second Round	Fordham; Southwestern Louisiana	W 75–63; L 72–74
2009	First Round	San Diego State	L 49–65
2010	First Round	Cincinnati	L 62–76

=== CBI results ===
The Wildcats have appeared in one College Basketball Invitational (CBI) and lost their opening game.

Year	Round	Opponent	Result
2011	First Round	Oregon	L 59–68

=== CIT results ===
The Wildcats have appeared in three CollegeInsider.com Postseason Tournaments (CIT), with a combined record of 6–3. They advanced to the championship game in 2013.

Year	Round	Opponent	Result
2012	First Round; Second Round	Utah Valley; Loyola Marymount	W 72–69; L 78–84 ^{OT}
2013	First Round; Second Round; Quarterfinals; Semifinals; Championship Game	Cal Poly; Air Force; Oral Roberts; Northern Iowa; East Carolina	W 85–43; W 78–57; W 83–74; W 59–56; L 74–77
2017	First Round; Second Round	Cal State Fullerton; Texas A&M–Corpus Christi	W 80–76; L 73–82

== Honors and accolades ==
=== Retired numbers ===
Number	Player	Years	Year retired
1	Damian Lillard	2008–2012	2017
22	Bruce Collins	1976–1980	2016
35	Willie Sojourner	1968–1971	2015

=== Weber State players in the NBA/ABA ===
The following former Wildcats have appeared in at least one NBA or ABA game:

- Lance Allred (C), 2008
- Larry Bergh (F), 1970
- Joel Bolomboy (F), 2017–2018
- Bob Davis (F), 1973
- Eddie Gill (G), 2001–2009
- Dillon Jones (F) 2025-present
- Damian Lillard (G), 2013–present
- Wat Misaka (G), 1948
- Ruben Nembhard (G), 1997
- Willie Sojourner (F), 1971–1975 (ABA)
- Dan Sparks (F), 1969-1970
- Justus Thigpen (G), 1970–1974
