= Big Sky Conference men's basketball tournament =

Annual college basketball tournament

- Conference basketball championship
- Sport: Basketball
- Conference: Big Sky Conference
- Number of teams: 11 (Since 2027); 10 (2023–2026); 11 (2019–2022); 12 (2016–2018); 8 (2015); 7 (2013–2014); 6 (1989–2012); 8 (1984–1988); 4 (1976–1983)
- Format: Single-elimination tournament
- Current stadium: Idaho Central Arena
- Current location: Boise, Idaho
- Played: 1976–present
- Last contest: 2026
- Current champion: Idaho
- Most championships: Montana (12)
- Official website: BigSkyConf.com Men's Basketball

Host stadiums
- Campus sites (1976–2015); Reno Events Center (2016–2018); Idaho Central Arena (formerly CenturyLink Arena) (2019–present)

Host locations
- Campus sites (1976–2015); Reno, Nevada (2016–2018); Boise, Idaho (2019–present)

The Big Sky Conference men's basketball tournament is the conference championship tournament in men's basketball for the Big Sky Conference. The event has been held annually since 1976, the conference's thirteenth year.

The tournament winner earns a berth in the NCAA Division I tournament.

== Format and host sites ==
For the Big Sky's first twelve seasons, it did not have a conference tournament. Starting with its fifth season of 1967–68, the regular season champion received a berth in the West regional of the NCAA tournament. In 1974, an unscheduled tiebreaker playoff was held; the two had identical records (conference & overall) and each had won at home to split the season series; visiting Idaho State prevailed at Montana in the Tuesday night playoff.

For the tournament's first eight editions (1976–1983), only the top four teams (of eight) in the conference standings participated. The tournament expanded to eight teams in 1984, then scaled back to six in 1989. Before 2016, when the tournament moved to a predetermined neutral site, it was often hosted by the regular season champion, but not always. If two or more teams tied for the regular season title, all were declared co-champions, but hosting rights were determined by a tiebreaker procedure. The first tournament in which the regular season champion did not host was in 1985.

Since the 2016 tournament, all full conference members (currently 10) have participated (barring NCAA sanctions or self-imposed postseason bans, the latter of which kept Northern Colorado out of the 2017 tournament), and the tournament is held at a predetermined site. The first such site to host was the Reno Events Center in Reno, Nevada, which hosted from 2016 to 2018.

On September 18, 2017, the Big Sky announced that its men's and women's tournaments would relocate in 2019 to Boise, Idaho; the initial contract ran for three years at the venue now known as Idaho Central Arena through 2021. The hosting contract has since been extended twice, with the most recent extension running through 2031.

== History of the tournament finals ==
Year	Champion	Score	Runner-up	Tournament MVP	Location
1976	Boise State	77–70^{OT}	Weber State	Jimmie Watts, Weber State	Wildcat Gym (Ogden, Utah)
1977	Idaho State	61–55	Weber State	Ed Thompson, Idaho State	ISU Minidome (Pocatello, Idaho)
1978	Weber State	62–55	Montana	Bruce Collins, Weber State	Adams Field House (Missoula, Montana)
1979	Weber State	92–70	Northern Arizona	Bruce Collins, Weber State	Dee Events Center (Ogden, Utah)
1980	Weber State	50–42	Montana	Bruce Collins, Weber State	Dee Events Center (Ogden, Utah)
1981	Idaho	70–64	Montana	Ken Owens, Idaho	Kibbie Dome (Moscow, Idaho)
1982	Idaho	85–80	Nevada	Ken Owens, Idaho	Kibbie Dome (Moscow, Idaho)
1983	Weber State	87–78	Nevada	Ken Green, Nevada	Centennial Coliseum (Reno, Nevada)
1984	Nevada	71–69	Montana	Curtis High, Nevada	Dee Events Center (Ogden, Utah)
1985	Nevada	79–63	Idaho State	Dwayne Randall, Nevada	BSU Pavilion (Boise, Idaho)
1986	Montana State	82–77	Montana	Tony Hampton, Montana State	Lawlor Events Center (Reno, Nevada)
1987	Idaho State	92–81	Nevada	Jim Rhode, Idaho State	Walkup Skydome (Flagstaff, Arizona)
1988	Boise State	63–61	Montana State	Chris Childs, Boise State	Brick Breeden Fieldhouse (Bozeman, Montana)
1989	Idaho	59–52	Boise State	Riley Smith, Idaho	BSU Pavilion (Boise, Idaho)
1990	Idaho	65–62	Eastern Washington	Riley Smith, Idaho	BSU Pavilion (Boise, Idaho)
1991	Montana	76–68	Idaho	Kevin Kearney, Montana	Dahlberg Arena (Missoula, Montana)
1992	Montana	73–68	Nevada	Delvon Anderson, Montana	Dahlberg Arena (Missoula, Montana)
1993	Boise State	80–68	Idaho	Tanoka Beard, Boise State	Kibbie Dome (Moscow, Idaho)
1994	Boise State	85–81	Idaho State	Shambric Williams, Boise State	BSU Pavilion (Boise, Idaho)
1995	Weber State	84–62	Montana	Ruben Nembhard, Weber State	Dee Events Center (Ogden, Utah)
1996	Montana State	81–70	Weber State	Danny Sprinkle, Montana State	Brick Breeden Fieldhouse (Bozeman, Montana)
1997	Montana	82–79	Cal State Northridge	Trenton Cross, Cal State Northridge	Walkup Skydome (Flagstaff, Arizona)
1998	Northern Arizona	77–50	Montana State	Dan McClintock, Northern Arizona	Walkup Skydome (Flagstaff, Arizona)
1999	Weber State	82–75	Northern Arizona	Eddie Gill, Weber State	Dee Events Center (Ogden, Utah)
2000	Northern Arizona	85–81^{OT}	Cal State Northridge	Ross Land, Northern Arizona	Dahlberg Arena (Missoula, Montana)
2001	Cal State Northridge	73–58	Eastern Washington	Brian Heinle, Cal State Northridge	Matadome (Northridge, California)
2002	Montana	70–66	Eastern Washington	Dan Trammel, Montana	Brick Breeden Fieldhouse (Bozeman, Montana)
2003	Weber State	60–57	Eastern Washington	Jermaine Boyette, Weber State	Dee Events Center (Ogden, Utah)
2004	Eastern Washington	71–59	Northern Arizona	Brendon Merritt, Eastern Washington	Reese Court (Cheney, Washington)
2005	Montana	63–61	Weber State	Kamarr Davis, Montana	Memorial Coliseum (Portland, Oregon)
2006	Montana	73–60	Northern Arizona	Virgil Matthews, Montana	Walkup Skydome (Flagstaff, Arizona)
2007	Weber State	88–80	Northern Arizona	David Patten, Weber State	Dee Events Center (Ogden, Utah)
2008	Portland State	67–51	Northern Arizona	Deonte Huff, Portland State	Rose Garden Arena (Portland, Oregon)
2009	Portland State	79–77	Montana State	Jeremiah Dominguez, Portland State	Dee Events Center (Ogden, Utah)
2010	Montana	66–65	Weber State	Anthony Johnson, Montana	Dee Events Center (Ogden, Utah)
2011	Northern Colorado* (vacated)	65–60	Montana	Devon Beitzel, Northern Colorado	Butler-Hancock Sports Pavilion (Greeley, Colorado)
2012	Montana	85–66	Weber State	Kareem Jamar, Montana	Dahlberg Arena (Missoula, Montana)
2013	Montana	67–64	Weber State	Kareem Jamar, Montana	Dahlberg Arena (Missoula, Montana)
2014	Weber State	88–67	North Dakota	Davion Berry, Weber State	Dee Events Center (Ogden, Utah)
2015	Eastern Washington	69–65	Montana	Tyler Harvey, Eastern Washington	Dahlberg Arena (Missoula, Montana)
2016	Weber State	62–59	Montana	Jeremy Senglin, Weber State	Reno Events Center (Reno, Nevada)
2017	North Dakota	93–89^{OT}	Weber State	Quinton Hooker, North Dakota	Reno Events Center (Reno, Nevada)
2018	Montana	82–65	Eastern Washington	Michael Oguine, Montana	Reno Events Center (Reno, Nevada)
2019	Montana	68–62	Eastern Washington	Ahmaad Rorie, Montana	CenturyLink Arena (Boise, Idaho)
2020	Canceled prior to quarterfinals due to the coronavirus pandemic				CenturyLink Arena (Boise, Idaho)
2021	Eastern Washington	65–55	Montana State	Tanner Groves, Eastern Washington	Idaho Central Arena (Boise, Idaho)
2022	Montana State	87–66	Northern Colorado	Xavier Bishop, Montana State	Idaho Central Arena (Boise, Idaho)
2023	Montana State	87–66	Northern Arizona	Raequan Battle, Montana State	Idaho Central Arena (Boise, Idaho)
2024	Montana State	85–70	Montana	Robert Ford III, Montana State	Idaho Central Arena (Boise, Idaho)
2025	Montana	91–83	Northern Colorado	Brandon Whitney, Montana	Idaho Central Arena (Boise, Idaho)
2026	Idaho	77–66	Montana	Money Williams, Montana	Idaho Central Arena (Boise, Idaho)
2027					Idaho Central Arena (Boise, Idaho)
2028					Idaho Central Arena (Boise, Idaho)
2029					Idaho Central Arena (Boise, Idaho)
2030					Idaho Central Arena (Boise, Idaho)
2031					Idaho Central Arena (Boise, Idaho)

== Finals performance by school ==
School	Championships	Appearances	Championship Years
Montana	12	23	1991, 1992, 1997, 2002, 2005, 2006, 2010, 2012, 2013, 2018, 2019, 2025
Weber State	10	18	1978, 1979, 1980, 1983, 1995, 1999, 2003, 2007, 2014, 2016
Montana State	5	9	1986, 1996, 2022, 2023, 2024
Idaho	5	7	1981, 1982, 1989, 1990, 2026
Boise State	4	5	1976, 1988, 1993, 1994
Eastern Washington	3	9	2004, 2015, 2021
Nevada	2	6	1984, 1985
Idaho State	2	4	1977, 1987
Northern Arizona	2	9	1998, 2000
Portland State	2	2	2008, 2009
Cal State Northridge	1	3	2001
North Dakota	1	2	2017
Northern Colorado	0	2	
Sacramento State	0	0	
Southern Utah	0	0	

- Current members of the Big Sky Conference are highlighted in yellow.
- Returning member Southern Utah is highlighted in blue. It had been a Big Sky member from 2012 to 2022 and will rejoin in 2026.
- Boise State was a member for 26 years (1970–96), Nevada for 13 years (1979–92).
- Charter member Idaho was out of the conference for 18 years (1996–2014).

== NCAA Tournament appearances ==
Year	Big Sky Team	Opponent	Result
1968	Weber State (Note: The regular season champion received a berth in the West regional of the NCAA tournament)	New Mexico State	L 57–68
1969	Weber State	Seattle; Santa Clara; New Mexico State	W 75–73; L 59–63^{OT} W 58–56 (Note: Regional third-place game)
1970	Weber State	Long Beach State	L 73–92
1971	Weber State	Long Beach State	L 66–77
1972	Weber State	Hawaii; UCLA; San Francisco	W 91–64; L 58–90; L 64–74
1973	Weber State	Long Beach State	L 75–88
1974	Idaho State (Note: A tiebreaker playoff against Montana determined the regular season champion to send to the NCAA tournament)	New Mexico	L 65–73
1975	Montana	Utah State; UCLA; UNLV	W 69–63; L 64–67; L 67–75
1976	Boise State	UNLV	L 78–103
1977	Idaho State	Long Beach State; UCLA; UNLV	W 83–72; W 76–75; L 90–107
1978	(4Q) Weber State	(2L) Arkansas	L 52–73
1979	(7) Weber State	(10) New Mexico State (2) Arkansas	W 81–78^{OT} L 63–74
1980	(7) Weber State	(10) Lamar	L 86–87
1981	(7) Idaho	(10) Pittsburgh	L 69–70^{OT}
1982	(3) Idaho	(6) Iowa (2) Oregon State	W 69–67^{OT} L 42–60
1983	(9) Weber State	(8) Washington State	L 52–62
1984	(11) Nevada	(6) Washington	L 54–64
1985	(14) Nevada	(3) NC State	L 56–65
1986	(16) Montana State	(1) St. John's	L 74–83
1987	(16) Idaho State	(1) UNLV	L 70–95
1988	(14) Boise State	(3) Michigan	L 58–63
1989	(13) Idaho	(4) UNLV	L 56–68
1990	(13) Idaho	(4) Louisville	L 59–78
1991	(16) Montana	(1) UNLV	L 65–99
1992	(14) Montana	(3) Florida State	L 68–78
1993	(14) Boise State	(3) Vanderbilt	L 72–92
1994	(13) Boise State	(4) Louisville	L 58–67
1995	(14) Weber State	(3) Michigan State (6) Georgetown	W 79–72; L 51–53
1996	(13) Montana State	(4) Syracuse	L 55–88
1997	(16) Montana	(1) Kentucky	L 54–92
1998	(15) Northern Arizona	(2) Cincinnati	L 71–93
1999	(14) Weber State	(3) North Carolina (6) Florida	W 76–74; L 74–82^{OT}
2000	(15) Northern Arizona	(2) St. John's	L 56–61
2001	(13) Cal State Northridge	(4) Kansas	L 75–99
2002	(15) Montana	(2) Oregon	L 62–81
2003	(12) Weber State	(5) Wisconsin	L 74–81
2004	(15) Eastern Washington	(2) Oklahoma State	L 56–75
2005	(16) Montana	(1) Washington	L 77–88
2006	(12) Montana	(5) Nevada (4) Boston College	W 87–79; L 56–69
2007	(15) Weber State	(2) UCLA	L 42–70
2008	(16) Portland State	(1) Kansas	L 61–85
2009	(13) Portland State	(4) Xavier	L 59–77
2010	(14) Montana	(3) New Mexico	L 57–62
2011	(15) Northern Colorado	(2) San Diego State	L 50–68
2012	(13) Montana	(4) Wisconsin	L 49–73
2013	(13) Montana	(4) Syracuse	L 34–81
2014	(16) Weber State	(1) Arizona	L 59–68
2015	(13) Eastern Washington	(4) Georgetown	L 74–84
2016	(15) Weber State	(2) Xavier	L 53–71
2017	(15) North Dakota	(2) Arizona	L 82–100
2018	(14) Montana	(3) Michigan	L 47–61
2019	(15) Montana	(2) Michigan	L 55–74
2021	(14) Eastern Washington	(3) Kansas	L 84–93
2022	(14) Montana State	(3) Texas Tech	L 62–97
2023	(14) Montana State	(3) Kansas State	L 65–77
2024	(16) Montana State	(16) Grambling State	L 81–88^{OT}
2025	(14) Montana	(3) Wisconsin	L 66–85
2026	(15) Idaho	(2) Houston	L 47–78

- 2020 NCAA tournament was canceled due to COVID-19.

== Broadcasters ==
=== Television ===
Year	Network	Play-by-play	Analyst
2024	ESPN2	Tony Parks	Joe Cravens
2023	ESPN2	Tony Parks	Joe Cravens
2022	ESPNU	Tony Parks	Joe Cravens
2021	ESPNU	Rich Hollenberg	Malcolm Huckaby
2020	ESPNU	Eric Rothman	Richie Schueler
2019	ESPNU	Sam Farber	Noah Savage
2018	ESPNU	Roxy Bernstein	Adrian Branch
2017	ESPNU	Roxy Bernstein	Corey Williams
2016	ESPNU	Roxy Bernstein	Corey Williams
2015	ESPNU	Roxy Bernstein	Corey Williams
2014	ESPNU	Roxy Bernstein	Corey Williams
2013	ESPNU	Kanoa Leahey	Corey Williams
2012	ESPN2	Roxy Bernstein	Miles Simon
2011	ESPN2	Roxy Bernstein	Miles Simon
2010	ESPN2	Dave Flemming	Bob Valvano

=== Radio ===
Year	Network	Play-by-play	Analyst
2024	Westwood One	J.B. Long	Nick Bahe
2023	Westwood One	Jason Benetti	Nick Bahe
2021	Westwood One	J.B. Long	Dan Dickau
2019	Westwood One	Ted Emrich	Dan Dickau
2018	Westwood One	Ted Emrich	Dan Dickau
2017	Westwood One	Kevin Lee	Dan Dickau
2013	Dial Global Sports	Wayne Larrivee	Perry Clark
2012	Dial Global Sports	Ted Robinson	Steve Lappas
2011	Westwood One	Ted Robinson	Steve Lappas

== See also ==
- Big Sky Conference women's basketball tournament
