= Portland State Vikings men's basketball statistical leaders =

The Portland State Vikings men's basketball statistical leaders are individual statistical leaders of the Portland State Vikings men's basketball program in various categories, including points, assists, blocks, rebounds, and steals. Within those areas, the lists identify single-game, single-season, and career leaders. The Vikings represent Portland State University in the NCAA's Big Sky Conference.

Portland State began competing in intercollegiate basketball in 1946. However, the school's record book does not generally list records from before the 1950s, as records from before this period are often incomplete and inconsistent. Since scoring was much lower in this era, and teams played much fewer games during a typical season, it is likely that few or no players from this era would appear on these lists anyway.

The NCAA did not officially record assists as a stat until the 1983–84 season, and blocks and steals until the 1985–86 season, but Portland State's record books includes players in these stats before these seasons. These lists are updated through the end of the 2020–21 season.

== Scoring ==
Career
| Rk | Player | Points | Seasons |
|---|---|---|---|
| 1 | Freeman Williams | 3,249 | 1974–75 1975–76 1976–77 1977–78 |
| 2 | John Nelson | 2,123 | 1962–63 1963–64 1964–65 1965–66 |
| 3 | Willie Stoudamire | 1,845 | 1969–70 1970–71 1971–72 |
| 4 | Seamus Boxley | 1,498 | 2000–01 2001–02 2002–03 2003–04 2004–05 |
| 5 | Holland Woods | 1,387 | 2017–18 2018–19 2019–20 |
| 6 | Anthony Lackey | 1,304 | 1998–99 1999–00 2000–01 2001–02 |
| 7 | Leo Franz | 1,245 | 1970–71 1971–72 1972–73 |
| 8 | Charlie Stoudamire | 1,179 | 1969–70 1970–71 1971–72 |
| 9 | John Winters | 1,169 | 1955–56 1956–57 1957–58 1958–59 |
| 10 | Derreck Brooks | 1,155 | 1973–74 1974–75 1975–76 1976–77 |

Season
| Rk | Player | Points | Season |
|---|---|---|---|
| 1 | Freeman Williams | 1,010 | 1976–77 |
| 2 | Freeman Williams | 969 | 1977–78 |
| 3 | Freeman Williams | 834 | 1975–76 |
| 4 | Willie Stoudamire | 753 | 1971–72 |
| 5 | Bill Wilkerson | 693 | 1966–67 |
| 6 | John Nelson | 649 | 1964–65 |
| 7 | John Nelson | 644 | 1965–66 |
| 8 | Jason Hartman | 639 | 1998–99 |
| 9 | Willie Stoudamire | 638 | 1970–71 |
| 10 | Don Porter | 634 | 1953–54 |

Single game
| Rk | Player | Points | Season | Opponent |
|---|---|---|---|---|
| 1 | Freeman Williams | 81 | 1977–78 | Rocky Mountain |

== Rebounds ==
Career
| Rk | Player | Rebounds | Seasons |
|---|---|---|---|
| 1 | Bob Sisul | 767 | 1976–77 1977–78 1978–79 |
| 2 | Jim Nelson | 766 | 1962–63 1963–64 1964–65 1965–66 |
| 3 | Seamus Boxley | 748 | 2000–01 2001–02 2002–03 2003–04 2004–05 |
| 4 | Derreck Brooks | 695 | 1973–74 1974–75 1975–76 1976–77 |
| 5 | Scott Morrison | 666 | 2004–05 2005–06 2006–07 2007–08 |
| 6 | Bill Wilkerson | 654 | 1965–66 1966–67 |
| 7 | Don Suloff | 653 | 1966–67 1967–68 1968–69 |
| 8 | Charlie Stoudamire | 646 | 1969–70 1970–71 1971–72 |
| 9 | John Nelson | 643 | 1962–63 1963–64 1964–65 1965–66 |
| 10 | Don Bridges | 640 | 1957–58 1958–59 1959–60 1960–61 |

Season
| Rk | Player | Rebounds | Season |
|---|---|---|---|
| 1 | Bill Wilkerson | 332 | 1966–67 |
| 2 | Bill Wilkerson | 322 | 1965–66 |
| 3 | Chehales Tapscott | 297 | 2011–12 |
| 4 | Cameron Forte | 288 | 2015–16 |
| 5 | Bob Sisul | 282 | 1978–79 |
| 6 | Jim Nelson | 276 | 1965–66 |
| 7 | Don Suloff | 274 | 1968–69 |
| 8 | Tre-Vaughn Minott | 273 | 2025–26 |
| 9 | Bill Turner | 266 | 1960–61 |
| | Jim Hollingsworth | 266 | 1962–63 |

Single game
| Rk | Player | Rebounds | Season | Opponent |
|---|---|---|---|---|
| 1 | Bernie Jones | 26 | 1958–59 | Oregon College of Education |

== Assists ==
Career
| Rk | Player | Assists | Seasons |
|---|---|---|---|
| 1 | Holland Woods | 521 | 2017–18 2018–19 2019–20 |
| 2 | Terry Adolph | 421 | 1976–77 1977–78 |
| 3 | Chucky Smith | 392 | 1973–74 1974–75 1976–77 1977–78 |
| 4 | Derek Nesland | 371 | 1996–97 1997–98 1998–99 1999–00 |
| 5 | Will Funn | 328 | 2003–04 2004–05 |
| 6 | Freeman Williams | 317 | 1974–75 1975–76 1976–77 1977–78 |
| 7 | Willie Stoudamire | 314 | 1969–70 1970–71 1971–72 |
| 8 | Gary Winston | 298 | 2011–12 2012–13 2013–14 2014–15 |
| 9 | Jerry Stephens | 293 | 1970–71 1971–72 |
| 10 | Dominic Waters | 248 | 2008–09 2009–10 |

Season
| Rk | Player | Assists | Season |
|---|---|---|---|
| 1 | Will Funn | 224 | 2004–05 |
| 2 | Terry Adolph | 211 | 1977–78 |
| 3 | Terry Adolph | 210 | 1976–77 |
| 4 | Qiant Myers | 196 | 2024–25 |
| 5 | Holland Woods | 191 | 2017–18 |
| 6 | Cameron Parker | 182 | 2022–23 |
| 7 | Jaylin Henderson | 181 | 2025–26 |
| 8 | Chucky Smith | 177 | 1974–75 |
| 9 | Holland Woods | 165 | 2019–20 |
| | Holland Woods | 165 | 2018–19 |

Single game
| Rk | Player | Assists | Season | Opponent |
|---|---|---|---|---|
| 1 | Terry Adolph | 19 | 1977–78 | St. Mary's |

== Steals ==
Career
| Rk | Player | Steals | Seasons |
|---|---|---|---|
| 1 | Holland Woods | 165 | 2017–18 2018–19 2019–20 |
| 2 | Calaen Robinson | 128 | 2015–16 2016–17 |
| 3 | Anthony Lackey | 121 | 1998–99 1999–00 2000–01 2001–02 |
| 4 | Zach Gengler | 120 | 2013–14 2014–15 2015–16 2016–17 |
| 5 | Jeremiah Dominguez | 115 | 2007–08 2008–09 |
| 6 | Will Funn | 111 | 2003–04 2004–05 |
| 7 | Julius Thomas | 110 | 2006–07 2007–08 2008–09 2009–10 |
| 8 | Kevin Briggs | 107 | 1999–00 2000–01 2001–02 2002–03 |
| 9 | Isaiah Johnson | 95 | 2022–23 2023–24 2024–25 |
| 10 | Terry Adolph | 94 | 1976–77 1977–78 |

Season
| Rk | Player | Steals | Season |
|---|---|---|---|
| 1 | Terry Adolph | 94 | 1977–78 |
| 2 | Calaen Robinson | 73 | 2016–17 |
| 3 | Holland Woods | 66 | 2019–20 |
| 4 | Will Funn | 62 | 2004–05 |
| | Jeremiah Dominguez | 62 | 2007–08 |
| 6 | Khalid Thomas | 57 | 2021–22 |
| 7 | Chehales Tapscott | 56 | 2011–12 |
| 8 | Bryce Canda | 55 | 2017–18 |
| | Calaen Robinson | 55 | 2015–16 |
| 10 | Jeremiah Dominguez | 53 | 2008–09 |

Single game
| Rk | Player | Steals | Season | Opponent |
|---|---|---|---|---|
| 1 | Deante Strickland | 9 | 2018–19 | Portland Bible |

== Blocks ==
Career
| Rk | Player | Blocks | Seasons |
|---|---|---|---|
| 1 | Scott Morrison | 187 | 2004–05 2005–06 2006–07 2007–08 |
| 2 | Seamus Boxley | 128 | 2000–01 2001–02 2002–03 2003–04 2004–05 |
| 3 | Sal Nuhu | 120 | 2018–19 2019–20 |
| 4 | Collin Spickerman | 117 | 2014–15 2015–16 |
| 5 | Jamie Jones | 105 | 2008–09 2009–10 |
| 6 | Tre-Vaughn Minott | 96 | 2023–24 2024–25 2025–26 |
| 7 | Hayden Curtiss | 79 | 2021–22 2022–23 2023–24 2024–25 |
| 8 | Jacob Eyman | 69 | 2020–21 2021–22 2022–23 |
| 9 | Chehales Tapscott | 62 | 2010–11 2011–12 |
| | Julius Thomas | 62 | 2006–07 2007–08 2008–09 2009–10 |

Season
| Rk | Player | Blocks | Season |
|---|---|---|---|
| 1 | Jamie Jones | 75 | 2009–10 |
| 2 | Collin Spickerman | 72 | 2014–15 |
| 3 | Scott Morrison | 70 | 2006–07 |
| 4 | Sal Nuhu | 64 | 2018–19 |
| 5 | Ryan Edwards | 57 | 2017–18 |
| 6 | Sal Nuhu | 56 | 2019–20 |
| 7 | Tre-Vaughn Minott | 54 | 2024–25 |
| 8 | Scott Morrison | 53 | 2007–08 |
| 9 | Collin Spickerman | 45 | 2015–16 |
| 10 | Hayden Curtiss | 44 | 2023–24 |

Single game
| Rk | Player | Blocks | Season | Opponent |
|---|---|---|---|---|
| 1 | Ryan Edwards | 7 | 2017–18 | California |
| | Collin Spickerman | 7 | 2014–15 | Sacramento State |
