= Ken Bone (basketball) =

American basketball player-coach

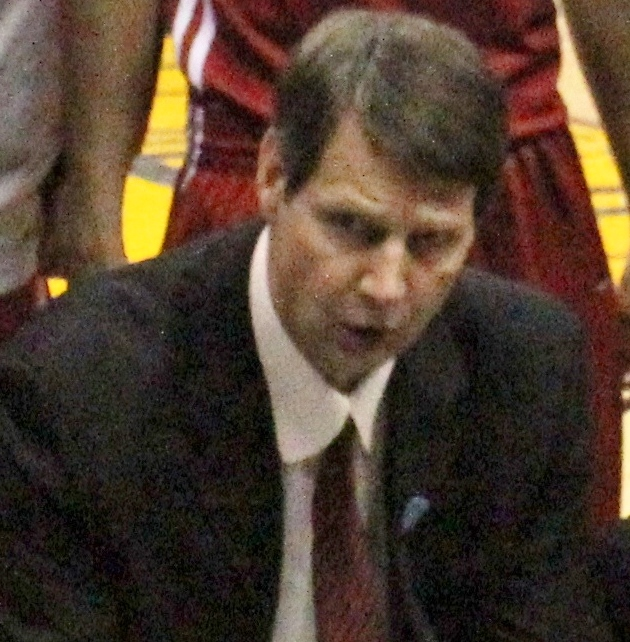
- Bone coaches Washington State during the 2011 Pacific-10 Conference men's basketball tournament.

Biographical details
- Born: May 21, 1958 (age 68); Seattle, Washington, U.S.

Playing career
- 1978–1979: Shoreline CC
- 1979–1980: Edmonds CC
- 1980–1982: Seattle Pacific

Coaching career (HC unless noted)
- 1982–1983: Shorewood HS (asst.)
- 1983–1984: Cal State Stanislaus (asst.)
- 1984–1985: Cal State Stanislaus
- 1985–1986: Olympic CC
- 1986–1990: Seattle Pacific (asst.)
- 1990–2002: Seattle Pacific
- 2002–2005: Washington (asst.)
- 2005–2009: Portland State
- 2009–2014: Washington State
- 2014–2016: Montana (AHC)
- 2016–2017: Gonzaga (special asst.)
- 2018–2024: Pepperdine (AHC)

Head coaching record
- Overall: 414–253 (.621) (college); 12–14 (.462) (junior college)
- Tournaments: 0–2 (NCAA Division I); 3–1 (NIT); 4–2 (CBI); 10–8 (NCAA Division II)

Accomplishments and honors

Championships
- Big Sky regular season (2008); 2 Big Sky tournament (2008, 2009)

Awards
- Big Sky Coach of the Year (2008)

Kenneth Walter Bone (born May 21, 1958) is an American basketball coach, most recently the associate head coach at Pepperdine University.

== Coaching career ==
Born in Seattle, Bone attended Shorecrest High School in Shoreline, Washington. His father Walt was a high school basketball coach. Ken Bone played junior college basketball at Shoreline Community College and Edmonds Community College before transferring to Seattle Pacific University in 1980 and playing there as a reserve guard for two years. Bone graduated from Seattle Pacific in 1983 with a bachelor's degree in physical education and later completed a master's in athletic administration from the same university in 1993.

Bone was an assistant coach at Shorewood High School and Cal State Stanislaus before returning to Seattle Pacific as an assistant coach in 1986, becoming head coach in 1990. In twelve years at Seattle Pacific, he compiled a 252–98 record and made 8 appearances in the NCAA Division II tournament, reaching the semifinals in 2000. From 2002 to 2005, Bone was an assistant coach at Washington under Lorenzo Romar, where he helped recruit all-time Huskies rebounding leader and former NBA player Jon Brockman, who was coached by Bone's older brother, Len Bone, the Snohomish High School boys' basketball coach.

In 2005, Ken Bone became head coach at Portland State and was selected as the 2007–08 Big Sky Conference Men's Basketball Coach of the Year after taking the Vikings to their first ever NCAA tournament. In 2009, Bone coached the Vikings to a second consecutive appearance in the NCAA tournament. In four years with Portland State, Bone compiled a 77–49 record.

In 2009, Bone accepted an offer to become the head coach at Washington State. He signed a 7-year contract.

Bone led Washington State to three winning seasons and two post-season berths in his first three years at the helm, and notched notable victories over the likes of Gonzaga, UCLA, Baylor and Washington. Future NBA standout Klay Thompson rose to stardom under Bone.

But he was dismissed from the WSU Basketball program on March 18, 2014 when Athletic Director, Bill Moos, elected to pay off the remaining two years on his seven-year contract. This was following a 2014 campaign that saw the Cougars go 10–21 overall and 3–15 in conference play.

After leaving WSU, Bone spent two years as an associate head coach at Montana, then joined Gonzaga as a special assistant to head coach Mark Few for the 2016–17 season. Bone was once again hired by Lorenzo Romar, this time as associate head coach at Pepperdine on March 13, 2018.

Bone has earned national recognition for his offensive coaching approach in both assistant and head coaching roles. His teams at Seattle Pacific University, Portland State, and Washington State were considered the nation's leaders in offensive efficiency.

== Head coaching record ==
Sources for Seattle Pacific:

Sources for Portland State and Washington State:

Record table
Season	Team	Overall	Conference	Standing	Postseason
Cal State Stanislaus (Northern California Athletic Conference) (1984–1985)
1984–85	Cal State Stanislaus	5–20	1–13		
Cal State Stanislaus:		5–20 (.200)			
Olympic Rangers (Northwest Athletic Association of Community Colleges) (1985–1986)
1985–86	Olympic	12–14	6–6	4th (North)	
Olympic:		12–14 (.462)	6–6 (.500)		
Seattle Pacific Falcons (Great Northwest/Pacific West Conference) (1990–2001)
1990–91	Seattle Pacific	17–10	5–3	T–1st	
1991–92	Seattle Pacific	23–8	7–3	T–1st	
1992–93	Seattle Pacific	21–9	7–3	T–3rd	
1993–94	Seattle Pacific	18–10	6–6	T–3rd	NCAA Division II First Round
1994–95	Seattle Pacific	20–9	9–3	1st	NCAA Division II Sweet 16
1995–96	Seattle Pacific	23–6	9–3	T–1st	NCAA Division II Sweet 16
1996–97	Seattle Pacific	18–9	6–6	T–3rd	
1997–98	Seattle Pacific	18–12	7–5	T–2nd	NCAA Division II Sweet 16
1998–99	Seattle Pacific	23–8	12–6	T–3rd	NCAA Division II Sweet 16
1999–00	Seattle Pacific	27–5	12–2	1st	NCAA Division II Final Four
2000–01	Seattle Pacific	21–6	14–4	2nd	NCAA Division II First Round
Seattle Pacific Falcons (Great Northwest Athletic Conference) (2001–2002)
2001–02	Seattle Pacific	24–5	15–3	T–1st	NCAA Division II Second Round
Seattle Pacific:		252–98 (.721)	109–47 (.699)		
Portland State Vikings (Big Sky Conference) (2005–2009)
2005–06	Portland State	12–16	5–9	T–5th	
2006–07	Portland State	19–13	9–7	4th	
2007–08	Portland State	23–10	14–2	1st	NCAA Division I Round of 64
2008–09	Portland State	23–10	11–5	T–2nd	NCAA Division I Round of 64
Portland State:		77–49 (.611)	44–23 (.657)		
Washington State Cougars (Pac-10/Pac-12 Conference) (2009–2014)
2009–10	Washington State	16–15	6–12	10th	
2010–11	Washington State	22–13	9–9	6th	NIT Semifinals
2011–12	Washington State	19–18	7–11	T–8th	CBI Runners-up
2012–13	Washington State	13–19	4–14	T–11th	
2013–14	Washington State	10–21	3–15	11th	
Washington State:		80–86 (.482)	29–62 (.319)		
Total:		429–266 (.617)			
National champion Postseason invitational champion Conference regular season champion Conference regular season and conference tournament champion Division regular season champion Division regular season and conference tournament champion Conference tournament champion
