= 2007–08 Portland State Vikings men's basketball team =

American college basketball season

2007–08 Portland State Vikings men's basketball
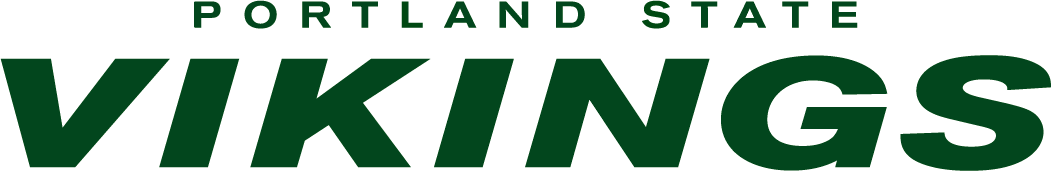

Big Sky tournament champions Big Sky Regular season champions

NCAA tournament
- Conference: Big Sky Conference
- Record: 23–10 (14–2 Big Sky)
- Head coach: Ken Bone (3rd season)
- Home arena: Viking Pavilion

2007–08 Big Sky men's basketball standings
	Conf.				Overall
Team	W		L	PCT	W		L	PCT
Portland State †	14	–	2	.875	23	–	10	.697
Northern Arizona	11	–	5	.688	21	–	11	.656
Weber State	10	–	6	.625	16	–	14	.533
Montana	8	–	8	.500	14	–	16	.467
Idaho State	8	–	8	.500	12	–	19	.387
Montana State	7	–	9	.438	15	–	15	.500
Northern Colorado	6	–	10	.375	13	–	16	.448
Eastern Washington	6	–	10	.375	11	–	19	.367
Sacramento State	2	–	14	.125	4	–	24	.143
† 2008 Big Sky tournament winner Rankings from AP Poll

The 2007–08 Portland State Vikings men's basketball team represented Portland State University during the 2007–08 NCAA Division I men's basketball season. The Vikings, led by head coach Ken Bone, played their home games at the Peter Stott Center and were members of the Big Sky Conference. They finished the season 23–10, 14–2 in Big Sky play to finish as regular season champions by three games. They won the Big Sky tournament to earn an automatic bid – the first in school history – to the NCAA tournament. As No. 16 seed in the Midwest region, the Vikings were defeated in the opening round by eventual National champion Kansas.

== Roster ==
2007–08 Portland State Vikings men's basketball team
Players
Coaches

Pos.	#	Name	Height	Weight	Year	Hometown
F	1	Julius Thomas	6 ft 5 in (1.96 m)	225 lb (102 kg)	So	Stockton, California
G	2	Deonte Huff	6 ft 4 in (1.93 m)	195 lb (88 kg)	Sr	Lancaster, California
G	3	Andre Murray	6 ft 2 in (1.88 m)	200 lb (91 kg)	Jr	Los Angeles, California
G	4	Mickey Polis	5 ft 8 in (1.73 m)	165 lb (75 kg)	Jr	Longview, Washington
G	10	Jeremiah Dominguez	5 ft 6 in (1.68 m)	150 lb (68 kg)	Jr	Salem, Oregon
G	12	Brian Curtis	5 ft 11 in (1.8 m)	165 lb (75 kg)	Sr	Wichita, Kansas
F	13	Tyrell Mara	6 ft 6 in (1.98 m)	235 lb (107 kg)	So
F	14	Kyle Coston	6 ft 8 in (2.03 m)	210 lb (95 kg)	So	Lynden, Washington
G	15	Dupree Lucas	6 ft 2 in (1.88 m)	170 lb (77 kg)	Sr	Wichita, Kansas
F	30	J. R. Moore	6 ft 8 in (2.03 m)	225 lb (102 kg)	Sr	Portland, Oregon
F	42	Alex Tiefenthaler	6 ft 9 in (2.06 m)	220 lb (100 kg)	So	Spanaway, Washington
C	44	Scott Morrison	6 ft 11 in (2.11 m)	250 lb (113 kg)	Sr

Head coach

- Ken Bone

Assistant coach(es)

Legend

- (C) Team captain
- (S) Suspended
- (I) Ineligible
- (W) Walk-on
- Injured
- Current redshirt

== Schedule and results ==
Date time, TV	Rank^{#}	Opponent^{#}	Result	Record	Site (attendance) city, state
Regular season
Nov 9, 2007*		at No. 2 UCLA	L 48–69	0–1	Pauley Pavilion (9,854); Los Angeles, California
Nov 16, 2007*		vs. IUPUI	W 75–73	1–1	Carlson Center (2,590); Fairbanks, Alaska
Nov 17, 2007*		vs. Akron	W 66–63	2–1	Carlson Center (2,928); Fairbanks, Alaska
Nov 18, 2007*		vs. Colorado State	L 63–64	2–2	Carlson Center (2,116); Fairbanks, Alaska
Nov 20, 2007*		Linfield	W 93–50	3–2	Viking Pavilion (750); Portland, Oregon
Nov 24, 2007*		at UC Davis	L 68–76	3–3	The Pavilion (848); Davis, California
Nov 28, 2007*		at Portland	W 78–73	4–3	Chiles Center (1,626); Portland, Oregon
Dec 1, 2007*		at Utah Valley State	W 60–53 ^{OT}	5–3	McKay Events Center (3,877); Orem, Utah
Dec 5, 2007*		Lewis & Clark	W 61–60	6–3	Viking Pavilion (1,028); Portland, Oregon
Dec 9, 2007*		at No. 8 Washington State	L 60–72	6–4	Friel Court (7,048); Pullman, Washington
Dec 12, 2007*		Cal Poly	W 74–66	7–4	Viking Pavilion (653); Portland, Oregon
Dec 18, 2007*		at Washington	L 65–84	7–5	Bank of America Arena (8,989); Seattle, Washington
Dec 22, 2007		at Eastern Washington	L 57–58	7–6 (0–1)	Reese Court (1,415); Cheney, Washington
Dec 28, 2007*		San Jose State	L 73–76 ^{OT}	7–7	Viking Pavilion (616); Portland, Oregon
Jan 3, 2008*		Sacramento State	W 83–58	8–7 (1–1)	Viking Pavilion (662); Portland, Oregon
Jan 5, 2008		Northern Arizona	W 80–66	9–7 (2–1)	Viking Pavilion (1,017); Portland, Oregon
Jan 10, 2008		at Weber State	L 68–73	9–8 (2–2)	Dee Events Center (2,785); Ogden, Utah
Jan 13, 2008		at Idaho State	W 71–61	10–8 (3–2)	Holt Arena (1,851); Pocatello, Idaho
Jan 19, 2008		Northern Colorado	W 85–83 ^{OT}	11–8 (4–2)	Viking Pavilion (836); Portland, Oregon
Jan 31, 2008		Montana	W 70–68	12–8 (5–2)	Viking Pavilion (1,272); Portland, Oregon
Feb 2, 2008		Montana State	W 96–85	13–8 (6–2)	Viking Pavilion (1,157); Portland, Oregon
Feb 7, 2008		at Northern Arizona	W 71–68	14–8 (7–2)	Walkup Skydome (1,631); Flagstaff, Arizona
Feb 9, 2008		at Sacramento State	W 79–56	15–8 (8–2)	Hornets Nest (703); Sacramento, California
Feb 14, 2008		Idaho State	W 81–58	16–8 (9–2)	Viking Pavilion (842); Portland, Oregon
Feb 16, 2008		Weber State	W 76–73	17–8 (10–2)	Viking Pavilion (1,500); Portland, Oregon
Feb 20, 2008		at Northern Colorado	W 88–79	18–8 (11–2)	Butler–Hancock Sports Pavilion (1,218); Greeley, Colorado
Feb 23, 2008*		at Cal State Fullerton	L 69–85	18–9	Titan Gym (713); Fullerton, California
Feb 28, 2008		at Montana State	W 96–68	19–9 (12–2)	Worthington Arena (5,102); Bozeman, Montana
Mar 1, 2008		at Montana	W 108–56	20–9 (13–2)	Dahlberg Arena (5,013); Missoula, Montana
Mar 4, 2008		Eastern Washington	W 76–74	21–9 (14–2)	Viking Pavilion (1,228); Portland, Oregon
Big Sky tournament
Mar 11, 2008*		Idaho State; Semifinals	W 72–61	22–9	Rose Garden Arena (3,188); Portland, Oregon
Mar 12, 2008*		Northern Arizona; Championship Game	W 67–51	23–9	Rose Garden Arena (4,113); Portland, Oregon
NCAA Tournament Tournament
Mar 20, 2008*	(16 MW)	vs. (1 MW) No. 4 Kansas; First Round	L 61–85	23–10	Qwest Center Omaha (17,162); Omaha, Nebraska
*Non-conference game. ^{#}Rankings from AP Poll. (#) Tournament seedings in parentheses. MW=Midwest. All times are in Pacific Time.

== Awards and honors ==
- Jeremiah Dominguez – Big Sky Player of the Year
- Ken Bone – Big Sky Men's Coach of the Year
