= 2008–09 Portland State Vikings men's basketball team =

American college basketball season

2008–09 Portland State Vikings men's basketball
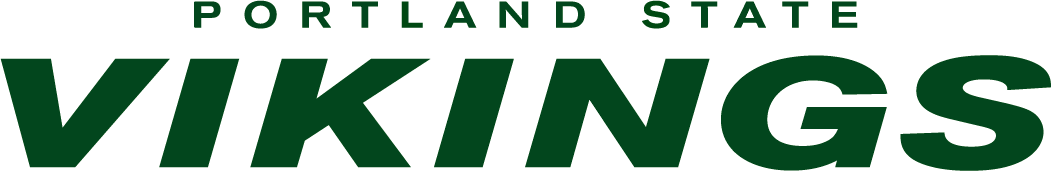

Big Sky tournament champions

NCAA tournament, First Round
- Conference: Big Sky Conference
- Record: 23–10 (11–5 Big Sky)
- Head coach: Ken Bone (4th season)
- Home arena: Viking Pavilion

2008–09 Big Sky men's basketball standings
	Conf.				Overall
Team	W		L	PCT	W		L	PCT
Weber State	15	–	1	.938	21	–	10	.677
Portland State †	11	–	5	.688	23	–	10	.697
Montana	11	–	5	.688	17	–	12	.586
Idaho State	9	–	7	.563	13	–	19	.406
Northern Colorado	8	–	8	.500	14	–	18	.438
Montana State	6	–	10	.375	14	–	17	.452
Eastern Washington	6	–	10	.375	12	–	18	.400
Northern Arizona	5	–	11	.313	8	–	19	.296
Sacramento State	1	–	15	.063	2	–	27	.069
† 2009 Big Sky tournament winner Rankings from AP Poll

The 2008–09 Portland State Vikings men's basketball team represented Portland State University during the 2008–09 NCAA Division I men's basketball season. The Vikings, led by head coach Ken Bone, played their home games at the Peter Stott Center and were members of the Big Sky Conference. They finished the season 23–10, 11–5 in Big Sky play to finish second in the conference regular season standings. They won the Big Sky tournament to earn an automatic bid – for the second straight season – to the NCAA tournament. As No. 13 seed in the East region, the Vikings were defeated in the opening round by Xavier.

== Roster ==
2008–09 Portland State Vikings men's basketball team
Players
Coaches

Pos.	#	Name	Height	Weight	Year	Hometown
F	1	Julius Thomas	6 ft 5 in (1.96 m)	225 lb (102 kg)	Jr	Stockton, California
G	3	Andre Murray	6 ft 2 in (1.88 m)	200 lb (91 kg)	Sr	Los Angeles, California
G	4	Mickey Polis	5 ft 8 in (1.73 m)	165 lb (75 kg)	Sr	Longview, Washington
G	10	Jeremiah Dominguez	5 ft 6 in (1.68 m)	150 lb (68 kg)	Sr	Salem, Oregon
G	11	Dominic Waters	6 ft 1 in (1.85 m)	180 lb (82 kg)	Jr	Portland, Oregon
F	13	Tyrell Mara	6 ft 6 in (1.98 m)	235 lb (107 kg)	Jr
F	14	Kyle Coston	6 ft 8 in (2.03 m)	210 lb (95 kg)	Jr	Lynden, Washington
F	21	Phil Nelson	6 ft 8 in (2.03 m)	220 lb (100 kg)	So	Keizer, Oregon
F	44	Jamie Jones	6 ft 7 in (2.01 m)	220 lb (100 kg)	Jr	El Segundo, California

Head coach

- Ken Bone

Assistant coach(es)

Legend

- (C) Team captain
- (S) Suspended
- (I) Ineligible
- (W) Walk-on
- Injured
- Current redshirt

== Schedule and results ==
Date time, TV	Rank^{#}	Opponent^{#}	Result	Record	Site (attendance) city, state
Regular season
Nov 15, 2008*		at Rice	W 78–74	1–0	Tudor Fieldhouse (1,834); Houston, Texas
Nov 18, 2008*		Portland	W 81–76	2–0	Viking Pavilion (1,500); Portland, Oregon
Nov 23, 2008*		Cal State Fullerton	W 76–75	3–0	Viking Pavilion (935); Portland, Oregon
Nov 26, 2008*		vs. Northern Illinois; Great Alaska Shootout	W 79–58	4–0	Sullivan Arena (5,619); Anchorage, Alaska
Nov 28, 2008*		vs. Hampton; Great Alaska Shootout	L 71–77 ^{OT}	4–1	Sullivan Arena (5,556); Anchorage, Alaska
Nov 29, 2008*		vs. Seattle; Great Alaska Shootout	W 81–67	5–1	Sullivan Arena (5,693); Anchorage, Alaska
Dec 6, 2008*		Seattle	W 73–68	6–1	Viking Pavilion (831); Portland, Oregon
Dec 9, 2008*		Lewis & Clark	W 77–66	7–1	Viking Pavilion (614); Portland, Oregon
Dec 14, 2008*		at Washington	L 83–84	7–2	Bank of America Arena (7,280); Seattle, Washington
Dec 17, 2008*		at Cal Poly	L 62–65	7–3	Mott Athletic Center (1,115); San Luis Obispo, California
Dec 20, 2008		Montana	W 72–45	8–3 (1–0)	Viking Pavilion (415); Portland, Oregon
Dec 23, 2008*		at No. 7 Gonzaga	W 77–70	9–3	McCarthey Athletic Center (6,000); Spokane, Washington
Dec 27, 2008*		at Texas Southern	W 63–55	10–3	Health and Physical Education Arena (521); Houston, Texas
Dec 29, 2008*		at No. 19 Baylor	L 66–79	10–4	Ferrell Center (5,544); Waco, Texas
Jan 2, 2009		at Sacramento State	W 79–67	11–4 (2–0)	Hornets Nest (705); Sacramento, California
Jan 4, 2009		at Northern Arizona	W 92–91 ^{4OT}	12–4 (3–0)	Walkup Skydome (886); Flagstaff, Arizona
Jan 8, 2009		Weber State	L 66–80	12–5 (3–1)	Viking Pavilion (1,216); Portland, Oregon
Jan 10, 2009		Idaho State	W 85–58	13–5 (4–1)	Viking Pavilion (1,431); Portland, Oregon
Jan 18, 2009		at Northern Colorado	W 57–43	14–5 (5–1)	Butler–Hancock Sports Pavilion (1,374); Greeley, Colorado
Jan 24, 2009		Eastern Washington	W 83–61	15–5 (6–1)	Viking Pavilion (1,500); Portland, Oregon
Jan 29, 2009		at Montana	L 65–72	15–6 (6–2)	Dahlberg Arena (4,316); Missoula, Montana
Feb 1, 2009		at Montana State	L 82–85	15–7 (6–3)	Worthington Arena (2,917); Bozeman, Montana
Feb 5, 2009		Northern Arizona	W 78–66	16–7 (7–3)	Viking Pavilion (1,237); Portland, Oregon
Feb 8, 2009		Sacramento State	W 59–42	17–7 (8–3)	Viking Pavilion (976); Portland, Oregon
Feb 12, 2009		at Idaho State	L 69–78	17–8 (8–4)	Holt Arena (2,627); Pocatello, Idaho
Feb 14, 2009		at Weber State	L 68–78	17–9 (8–5)	Dee Events Center (4,811); Ogden, Utah
Feb 19, 2009		Northern Colorado	W 77–74	18–9 (9–5)	Viking Pavilion (966); Portland, Oregon
Feb 21, 2009*		Boise State	W 93–81	19–9	Viking Pavilion (1,500); Portland, Oregon
Feb 25, 2009		Montana State	W 64–58	20–9 (10–5)	Viking Pavilion (1,262); Portland, Oregon
Feb 28, 2009		at Eastern Washington	W 66–62 ^{OT}	21–9 (11–5)	Reese Court (1,969); Cheney, Washington
Big Sky tournament
Mar 10, 2009*		vs. Idaho State; Semifinals	W 61–53	22–9	Dee Events Center (2,779); Ogden, Utah
Mar 11, 2009*		Montana State; Championship Game	W 79–77	23–9	Dee Events Center (1,546); Ogden, Utah
NCAA Tournament Tournament
Mar 20, 2009*	(13 E)	vs. (4 E) No. 20 Xavier; First Round	L 59–77	23–10	Taco Bell Arena; Boise, Idaho
*Non-conference game. ^{#}Rankings from AP Poll. (#) Tournament seedings in parentheses. MW=Midwest. All times are in Pacific Time.
