= 1999–2000 Northern Arizona Lumberjacks men's basketball team =

American college basketball season

1999–2000 Northern Arizona Lumberjacks men's basketball

Big Sky tournament champions

NCAA tournament
- Conference: Big Sky Conference
- Record: 20–11 (11–5 Big Sky)
- Head coach: Mike Adras (1st season)
- Home arena: Walkup Skydome

1999–2000 Big Sky men's basketball standings
	Conf.				Overall
Team	W		L	PCT	W		L	PCT
Montana	12	–	4	.750	17	–	11	.607
Eastern Washington	12	–	4	.750	15	–	12	.556
Northern Arizona †	11	–	5	.688	20	–	11	.645
Cal State Northridge	10	–	6	.625	20	–	10	.667
Weber State	10	–	6	.625	18	–	10	.643
Portland State	7	–	9	.438	15	–	14	.517
Montana State	4	–	12	.250	12	–	17	.414
Sacramento State	3	–	13	.188	9	–	18	.333
Idaho State	3	–	13	.188	8	–	19	.296
† Conference tournament winner Rankings from AP poll

The 1999–2000 Northern Arizona Lumberjacks men's basketball team represented Northern Arizona University in the 1999-2000 NCAA Division I men's basketball season. The Lumberjacks were led by head coach Mike Adras, and played their home games at the Walkup Skydome in Flagstaff, Arizona as members of the Big Sky Conference. After finishing third during the conference regular season, the Lumberjacks won the Big Sky tournament to receive an automatic bid to the NCAA tournament. As No. 15 seed in the West region, they lost to No. 2 seed St. John's in the opening round, 61–56.

== Schedule and results ==
Date time, TV	Rank^{#}	Opponent^{#}	Result	Record	Site (attendance) city, state
Non-conference regular season
November 20, 1999*		Boise State	W 60–53	1–0	Walkup Skydome; Flagstaff, AZ
November 23, 1999*		at Cal Poly	W 76–72	2–0	Robert A. Mott Athletics Center; San Luis Obispo, CA
November 27, 1999*		San Jose State	L 46–49	2–1	Walkup Skydome; Flagstaff, AZ
November 30, 1999*		Utah State	W 64–52	3–1	Walkup Skydome; Flagstaff, AZ
December 4, 1999*		at Fresno State	L 68–74	3–2	Selland Arena; Fresno, CA
December 9, 1999*		at Utah State	L 58–80	3–3	Dee Glen Smith Spectrum; Logan, UT
December 11, 1999*		at Boise State	L 48–58	3–4	BSU Pavilion; Boise, ID
December 18, 1999*		Cal Poly	W 97–68	4–4	Walkup Skydome; Flagstaff, AZ
December 22, 1999*		at Oregon	L 54–91	4–5	McArthur Court; Eugene, OR
December 28, 1999*		Bethany	W 116–63	5–5	Walkup Skydome; Flagstaff, AZ
December 30, 1999*		Jamestown	W 74–67	6–5	Walkup Skydome; Flagstaff, AZ
Big Sky regular season
January 4, 2000		at Sacramento State	L 62–65	6–6 (0–1)	Hornets Nest; Sacramento, CA
January 6, 2000		at Cal State Northridge	L 66–69	6–7 (0–2)	Matadome; Northridge, CA
January 13, 2000		at Eastern Washington	L 65–74	6–8 (0–3)	Reese Court; Cheney, WA
January 15, 2000		at Portland State	L 75–101	6–9 (0–4)	Peter W. Stott Center; Portland, OR
January 20, 2000		Montana	W 85–72	7–9 (1–4)	Walkup Skydome; Flagstaff, AZ
January 22, 2000		Montana State	W 89–80	8–9 (2–4)	Walkup Skydome; Flagstaff, AZ
January 26, 2000		at Idaho State	W 67–50	9–9 (3–4)	Holt Arena; Pocatello, ID
January 28, 2000		at Weber State	W 76–66	10–9 (4–4)	Dee Events Center; Ogden, UT
February 5, 2000		Idaho State	W 82–68	11–9 (5–4)	Walkup Skydome; Flagstaff, AZ
February 12, 2000		Cal State Northridge	W 83–73	12–9 (6–4)	Walkup Skydome; Flagstaff, AZ
February 17, 2000		Montana State	W 76–74	13–9 (7–4)	Walkup Skydome; Flagstaff, AZ
February 19, 2000		Montana	W 85–59	14–9 (8–4)	Walkup Skydome; Flagstaff, AZ
February 24, 2000		Portland State	W 71–57	15–9 (9–4)	Walkup Skydome; Flagstaff, AZ
February 26, 2000		Eastern Washington	W 76–68	16–9 (10–4)	Walkup Skydome; Flagstaff, AZ
March 1, 2000		Sacramento State	W 88–65	17–9 (11–4)	Walkup Skydome; Flagstaff, AZ
March 3, 2000		Weber State	L 73–84	17–10 (11–5)	Walkup Skydome; Flagstaff, AZ
Big Sky tournament
March 8, 2000*		vs. Portland State; Quarterfinals	W 77–75	18–10	Dahlberg Arena; Missoula, MT
March 10, 2000*		vs. Eastern Washington; Semifinals	W 82–65	19–10	Dahlberg Arena; Missoula, MT
March 11, 2000*		vs. Cal State Northridge; Championship game	W 85–81 ^{OT}	20–10	Dahlberg Arena; Missoula, MT
NCAA tournament
March 16, 2000*	(15 W)	vs. (2 W) No. 9 St. John's; First round	L 56–61	20–11	McKale Center; Tucson, AZ
*Non-conference game. ^{#}Rankings from AP poll. (#) Tournament seedings in parentheses. All times are in Mountain.
