= 2000 Big Sky Conference men's basketball tournament =

- Classification: Division I
- Season: 1999–00
- Teams: 6
- Site: Dahlberg Arena; Missoula, MT
- Champions: Northern Arizona (2nd title)
- Winning coach: Mike Adras (1st title)
- MVP: Ross Land (Northern Arizona)

1999–2000 Big Sky men's basketball standings
	Conf.				Overall
Team	W		L	PCT	W		L	PCT
Montana	12	–	4	.750	17	–	11	.607
Eastern Washington	12	–	4	.750	15	–	12	.556
Northern Arizona †	11	–	5	.688	20	–	11	.645
Cal State Northridge	10	–	6	.625	20	–	10	.667
Weber State	10	–	6	.625	18	–	10	.643
Portland State	7	–	9	.438	15	–	14	.517
Montana State	4	–	12	.250	12	–	17	.414
Sacramento State	3	–	13	.188	9	–	18	.333
Idaho State	3	–	13	.188	8	–	19	.296
† Conference tournament winner Rankings from AP poll

The 2000 Big Sky Conference men's basketball tournament was held March 8–11 at Dahlberg Arena at the University of Montana in Missoula, Montana.

Northern Arizona defeated Cal State Northridge in the championship game, 85–81, to win their second Big Sky men's basketball tournament title. It was NAU's second title in three years.

The Lumberjacks, in turn, received an automatic bid to the 2000 NCAA tournament. No other Big Sky members were invited this year.

== Format ==
No new teams were added to the Big Sky prior to the 1999–2000 season, leaving total membership at nine.

No changes were made to the existing tournament format. Only the top six teams from the regular season conference standings were invited to the tournament. The two top teams were given byes into the semifinals while the third- through sixth-seeded teams were placed and paired into the preliminary quarterfinal round. Following the quarterfinals, the two victorious teams were re-seeded for the semifinal round, with the lowest-seeded remaining team paired with the tournament's highest seed and vis-versa for the other.

== Bracket ==
Quarterfinals; Wednesday, March 8 Thursday, March 9
3	Northern Arizona	77
6	Portland State	75
4	Cal State Northridge	73
5	Weber State	68

Semifinals; Friday, March 10
1	Montana	65
4	Cal State Northridge	76
2	Eastern Washington	65
3	Northern Arizona	82

Championship; Saturday, March 11
4	Cal State Northridge	81
3	Northern Arizona	85

== See also ==
- Big Sky Conference women's basketball tournament
