= 2003 Big Sky Conference men's basketball tournament =

- Classification: Division I
- Season: 2002–03
- Teams: 6
- Site: Dee Events Center; Ogden, UT
- Champions: Weber State (7th title)
- Winning coach: Joe Cravens (1st title)
- MVP: Jermaine Boyette (Weber State)

2002–03 Big Sky men's basketball standings
	Conf.				Overall
Team	W		L	PCT	W		L	PCT
Weber State †	14	–	0	1.000	26	–	6	.813
Eastern Washington	9	–	5	.643	18	–	13	.581
Idaho State	7	–	7	.500	15	–	14	.517
Montana	7	–	7	.500	13	–	17	.433
Northern Arizona	6	–	8	.429	15	–	13	.536
Sacramento State	5	–	9	.357	12	–	17	.414
Montana State	5	–	9	.357	11	–	16	.407
Portland State	3	–	11	.214	5	–	22	.185
† Conference tournament winner

The 2003 Big Sky Conference men's basketball tournament was held March 8–12 at the Dee Events Center at Weber State University in Ogden, Utah.

Top-seeded Weber State defeated Eastern Washington in the championship game, 60–57, to win their seventh Big Sky men's basketball tournament title. It was EWU's third consecutive Big Sky championship game loss.

The Wildcats, in turn, received an automatic bid to the 2003 NCAA tournament. No other Big Sky members were invited this year.

== Format ==
No new teams were added to the Big Sky prior to the 2002–03 season, leaving total membership at eight. Despite joining the conference in 1996, this was Sacramento State's first appearance in a Big Sky tournament.

No changes were made to the existing tournament format. Only the top six teams from the regular season conference standings were invited to the tournament. The two top teams were given byes into the semifinals while the third- through sixth-seeded teams were placed and paired into the preliminary quarterfinal round. Following the quarterfinals, the two victorious teams were re-seeded in the semifinal round, with the lowest-seeded remaining team paired with the tournament's highest seed and vis-versa for the other.

== Bracket ==
Quarterfinals; Saturday, March 8
3	Montana	75
6	Sacramento State	88
4	Idaho State	85
5	Northern Arizona	74

Semifinals; Tuesday, March 11
1	Weber State	82
6	Sacramento State	60
2	Eastern Washington	76
4	Idaho State	67

Championship; Wednesday, March 12
1	Weber State	60
2	Eastern Washington	57

== See also ==
- Big Sky Conference women's basketball tournament
