= 2006 Big Sky Conference men's basketball tournament =

- Classification: Division I
- Season: 2005–06
- Teams: 6
- First round site: campus sites
- Semifinals site: Walkup Skydome; Flagstaff, Arizona
- Finals site: Walkup Skydome; Flagstaff, Arizona
- Champions: Montana (6th title)
- Winning coach: Larry Krystkowiak (2nd title)
- MVP: Virgil Matthews (Montana)

2005–06 Big Sky men's basketball standings
	Conf.				Overall
Team	W		L	PCT	W		L	PCT
Northern Arizona	12	–	2	.857	21	–	11	.656
Montana †	10	–	4	.714	24	–	7	.774
Eastern Washington	9	–	5	.643	15	–	15	.500
Montana State	7	–	7	.500	15	–	15	.500
Sacramento State	5	–	9	.357	15	–	15	.500
Portland State	5	–	9	.357	12	–	16	.429
Idaho State	4	–	10	.286	13	–	14	.481
Weber State	4	–	10	.286	10	–	17	.370
† Conference tournament winner

The 2006 Big Sky men's basketball tournament was held March 4–8, with the final two rounds at the Walkup Skydome in Flagstaff, Arizona, home of regular season champion Northern Arizona.

Second-seeded Montana defeated host Northern Arizona in the championship game, 73–60, to win their sixth Big Sky tournament title.

== Format ==
Conference membership remained at eight. Similar to the previous year, the top six teams in the regular season conference standings participated in the tournament. The top two earned byes into the semifinals while the remaining four played in the quarterfinals, which were played on Saturday at the home court of the higher seed. The lowest remaining seed met the top seed in the semifinals on Tuesday.

== Bracket ==
Quarterfinals; Saturday, March 4
4	Montana State	70
5	Sacramento State	71
(Pairings are reseeded after the first round)
3	Eastern Washington	81
6	Portland State	75

Semifinals; Tuesday, March 7
1	Northern Arizona	98
5	Sacramento State	83
2	Montana	73
3	Eastern Washington	71

Championship; Wednesday, March 8
1	Northern Arizona	60
2	Montana	73

== NCAA tournament ==
Montana earned the automatic bid to the NCAA tournament, and no other Big Sky members were invited. Seeded twelfth in the Minneapolis regional (Midwest), the Grizzlies upset Nevada in the first round at Salt Lake City. They were stopped in the next round by Boston College.

The Big Sky has had a berth in the NCAA tournament since 1968, and Montana was the conference's ninth and most recent team to advance.

Northern Arizona was invited to the 40-team NIT, but lost in the first round to Delaware State.
