= 2005–06 Montana Grizzlies basketball team =

American college basketball season

2005–06 Montana Grizzlies basketball

Big Sky tournament champions

NCAA tournament, Round of 32
- Conference: Big Sky Conference
- Record: 24–7 (10–4 Big Sky)
- Head coach: Larry Krystkowiak (2nd season)
- Home arena: Dahlberg Arena

2005–06 Big Sky men's basketball standings
	Conf.				Overall
Team	W		L	PCT	W		L	PCT
Northern Arizona	12	–	2	.857	21	–	11	.656
Montana †	10	–	4	.714	24	–	7	.774
Eastern Washington	9	–	5	.643	15	–	15	.500
Montana State	7	–	7	.500	15	–	15	.500
Sacramento State	5	–	9	.357	15	–	15	.500
Portland State	5	–	9	.357	12	–	16	.429
Idaho State	4	–	10	.286	13	–	14	.481
Weber State	4	–	10	.286	10	–	17	.370
† Conference tournament winner

The 2005–06 Montana Grizzlies basketball team represented the University of Montana during the 2005–06 NCAA Division I men's basketball season. The Grizzlies, led by second-year head coach Larry Krystkowiak, played their home games at Dahlberg Arena and were members of the Big Sky Conference. They finished the season 24–7, 10–4 in Big Sky play to finish tied for second place in the conference regular season standings. Montana won the Big Sky Basketball tournament to earn the conference's automatic berth into the NCAA tournament. After upsetting No. 5 seed Nevada in the opening round, the Grizzlies lost to No. 4 seed Boston College.

== Roster ==
2005–06 Montana Grizzlies men's basketball team
Players
Coaches

Pos.	#	Name	Height	Weight	Year	Hometown
G	12	Kevin Criswell	6 ft 2 in (1.88 m)	200 lb (91 kg)	Sr	Colstrip, Montana
F	34	Andrew Strait	6 ft 8 in (2.03 m)	245 lb (111 kg)	So	Yakima, Washington

Head coach

- Wayne Tinkle

Assistant coach(es)

Legend

- (C) Team captain
- (S) Suspended
- (I) Ineligible
- (W) Walk-on
- Injured
- Current redshirt

Roster

== Schedule and results ==
Date time, TV	Rank^{#}	Opponent^{#}	Result	Record	Site (attendance) city, state
Regular season
Nov 18, 2005*		at Boise State	L 69–90	0–1	Taco Bell Arena (6,293); Boise, Idaho
2006 Big Sky Tournament
Mar 7, 2006*	(2)	vs. (3) Eastern Washington; Semifinals	W 73–71 ^{OT}	22–6	Walkup Skydome; Flagstaff, Arizona
Mar 8, 2006*	(2)	at (1) Northern Arizona; Championship game	W 73–60	23–6	Walkup Skydome (3,163); Flagstaff, Arizona
2006 NCAA Tournament
Mar 16, 2006*	(12 MW)	vs. (5 MW) No. 20 Nevada; First Round	W 87–79	24–6	Jon M. Huntsman Center (15,122); Salt Lake City, Utah
Mar 18, 2006*; 3:40 p.m.	(12 MW)	vs. (4 MW) No. 7 Boston College; Second Round	L 56–69	24–7	Jon M. Huntsman Center (15,122); Salt Lake City, Utah
*Non-conference game. ^{#}Rankings from AP Poll. (#) Tournament seedings in parentheses. All times are in Mountain Time (#) during NCAA Tournament is seed with Region.
