= 2002–03 Weber State Wildcats men's basketball team =

American college basketball season

2002–03 Weber State Wildcats men's basketball

Big Sky Regular Season and tournament champions

NCAA tournament, Round of 64
- Conference: Big Sky Conference
- Record: 26–6 (14–0 Big Sky)
- Head coach: Joe Cravens
- Home arena: Dee Events Center

2002–03 Big Sky men's basketball standings
	Conf.				Overall
Team	W		L	PCT	W		L	PCT
Weber State †	14	–	0	1.000	26	–	6	.813
Eastern Washington	9	–	5	.643	18	–	13	.581
Idaho State	7	–	7	.500	15	–	14	.517
Montana	7	–	7	.500	13	–	17	.433
Northern Arizona	6	–	8	.429	15	–	13	.536
Sacramento State	5	–	9	.357	12	–	17	.414
Montana State	5	–	9	.357	11	–	16	.407
Portland State	3	–	11	.214	5	–	22	.185
† 2003 Big Sky tournament winner

The 2002–03 Weber State Wildcats men's basketball team represented Weber State University during the 2002–03 NCAA Division I men's basketball season. The Wildcats were led by head coach Joe Cravens and played their home games at the Dee Events Center. They were members of the Big Sky Conference. They finished the season 26–6 overall, with a sterling 14–0 mark in Big Sky play to win the conference regular season championship. They were also champions of the Big Sky Conference tournament to earn an automatic bid to the NCAA tournament where they lost in the opening round to Wisconsin.

== Roster ==
2002–03 Weber State Wildcats men's basketball team
Players	Coaches
Pos. / # / Name / Height / Weight / Year / Hometown; G / 3 / Jermaine Boyette / 6 ft 2 in (1.88 m) / 195 lb (88 kg) / Sr / Hammond, Indiana	Head coach: Randy Rahe; Assistant coach(es) Legend: (C) Team captain; (S) Suspended; (I) Ineligible; (W) Walk-on; Injured; Current redshirt

== Schedule and results ==
Date time, TV	Rank^{#}	Opponent^{#}	Result	Record	Site (attendance) city, state
Regular season
Nov 22, 2002*		vs. UC Santa Barbara; BP Top of The World Classic	W 91–82	1–0	Carlson Center (4,025); Fairbanks, Alaska
Nov 23, 2002*		vs. Ball State; BP Top of The World Classic	W 72–67	2–0	Carlson Center (4,043); Fairbanks, Alaska
Nov 24, 2002*		at Alaska Fairbanks; BP Top of The World Classic	L 65–77	2–1	Carlson Center (4,301); Fairbanks, Alaska
Nov 27, 2002		Montana Tech	W 94–58	3–1 (1–1)	Dee Events Center (2,498); Odgen, Utah
Nov 30, 2002*		Nevada	W 73–70	4–1	Dee Events Center (4,418); Odgen, Utah
Dec 6, 2002*		vs. North Texas	L 72–76	4–2	Winthrop Coliseum (151); Rock Hill, South Carolina
Dec 7, 2002*		vs. Morris Brown	W 65–56	5–2	Winthrop Coliseum (62); Rock Hill, South Carolina
Dec 14, 2002*		UW–Green Bay	W 78–72	6–2	Dee Events Center (4,103); Odgen, Utah
Dec 17, 2002*		at Portland	W 78–71	7–2	Chiles Center (619); Portland, Oregon
Dec 21, 2002*		at Utah State	L 64–66	7–3	Dee Glen Smith Spectrum (7,546); Logan, Utah
Dec 23, 2002*		at Boise State	W 66–65	8–3	BSU Pavilion (3,457); Boise, Idaho
Dec 29, 2002*		vs. Maine; Dr. Pepper Classic	W 69–66	9–3	McKenzie Arena (3,500); Chattanooga, Tennessee
Dec 30, 2002*		at Chattanooga; Dr. Pepper Classic	L 63–75	9–4	McKenzie Arena (3,969); Chattanooga, Tennessee
Jan 3, 2003*		at Utah	L 58–72	9–5	Jon M. Huntsman Center (11,461); Salt Lake City, Utah
Jan 8, 2003*		BYU	W 75–69	10–5	Dee Events Center (10,820); Odgen, Utah
Jan 16, 2003		Montana State	W 78–70	11–5 (1–0)	Dee Events Center (4,797); Ogden, Utah
Jan 18, 2003		Montana	W 97–73	12–5 (2–0)	Dee Events Center (5,248); Ogden, Utah
Jan 23, 2003		at Northern Arizona	W 64–61	13–5 (3–0)	Walkup Skydome (2,569); Flagstaff, Arizona
Jan 25, 2003		at Sacramento State	W 65–53	14–5 (4–0)	Hornets Nest (1,208); Sacramento, California
Jan 30, 2003		Portland State	W 77–64	15–5 (5–0)	Dee Events Center (4,313); Ogden, Utah
Feb 1, 2003		Eastern Washington	W 74–61	16–5 (6–0)	Dee Events Center (9,621); Ogden, Utah
Feb 5, 2003		at Idaho State	W 82–76	17–5 (7–0)	Holt Arena (3,228); Pocatello, Idaho
Feb 8, 2003		Idaho State	W 87–70	18–5 (8–0)	Dee Events Center (6,795); Odgen, Utah
Feb 13, 2003		at Montana	W 75–72	19–5 (9–0)	Dahlberg Arena (3,734); Missoula, Montana
Feb 15, 2003		at Montana State	W 70–58	20–5 (10–0)	Worthington Arena (4,510); Havre, Montana
Feb 20, 2003		Sacramento State	W 88–65	21–5 (11–0)	Dee Events Center (5,279); Odgen, Utah
Feb 22, 2003		Northern Arizona	W 79–64	22–5 (12–0)	Dee Events Center (10,210); Odgen, Utah
Feb 27, 2003		at Eastern Washington	W 67–64	23–5 (13–0)	Reese Court (4,131); Cheney, Washington
Mar 1, 2003		at Portland State	W 83–73	24–5 (14–0)	Peter W. Stott Center (756); Portland, Oregon
Big Sky tournament
Mar 11, 2003*		Sacramento State; Semifinals	W 82–60	25–5	Dee Events Center (8,114); Ogden, Utah
Mar 12, 2003*		Eastern Washington; Championship game	W 60–57	26–5	Dee Events Center (10,121); Ogden, Utah
NCAA tournament
Mar 20, 2003*	(12 W)	vs. (5 W) No. 21 Wisconsin; First round	L 74–81	26–6	Spokane Veterans Memorial Arena; Spokane, Washington
*Non-conference game. ^{#}Rankings from AP poll. (#) Tournament seedings in parentheses. MW=Midwest. All times are in Mountain time.
