= 1991 Big Sky Conference men's basketball tournament =

- Classification: Division I
- Season: 1990–91
- Teams: 6
- Site: Dahlberg Arena; Missoula, Montana
- Champions: Montana (1st title)
- Winning coach: Stew Morrill (1st title)
- MVP: Kevin Kearney (Montana)

1990–91 Big Sky men's basketball standings
	Conf.				Overall
Team	W		L	PCT	W		L	PCT
Montana †	13	–	3	.813	23	–	8	.742
Nevada	12	–	4	.750	17	–	14	.548
Idaho	11	–	5	.688	19	–	11	.633
Boise State	10	–	6	.625	17	–	10	.630
Idaho State	7	–	9	.438	11	–	18	.379
Weber State	7	–	9	.438	12	–	16	.429
Montana State	6	–	10	.375	12	–	16	.429
Eastern Washington	5	–	11	.313	11	–	16	.407
Northern Arizona	1	–	15	.063	4	–	23	.148
† Conference tournament winner

The 1991 Big Sky Conference men's basketball tournament was the sixteenth edition, held March 6–9 at Dahlberg Arena at the University of Montana in Missoula, Montana.

Top-seeded host Montana defeated two-time defending champion Idaho in the championship game, 76–68, to win their first Big Sky tournament title.

== Format ==
No new teams were added to the Big Sky prior to the 1990–91 season, leaving total membership at nine.

No changes were made to the tournament format, except that host site was not predetermined and went to the regular season champion. The top six teams from the regular season were included; the top two earned byes into the semifinals while the remaining four played in the quarterfinals.

== Bracket ==
Quarterfinals; Wednesday, March 6
4	Boise State	69
5	Idaho State	73
3	Idaho	60
6	Weber State	54

Semifinals; Friday, March 8
1	Montana	109
5	Idaho State	97
2	Nevada	74
3	Idaho	93

Championship; Saturday, March 9
1	Montana	76
3	Idaho	68

== NCAA tournament ==
The Grizzlies gained the automatic bid to the NCAA tournament, and no other Big Sky members were invited. Seeded sixteenth in the West Regional, Montana lost to UNLV in Tucson in the first round. Boise State hosted a first-round game in the NIT, but lost by a point to Southern Illinois.

== See also ==
- Big Sky Conference women's basketball tournament
