= Chehales Tapscott =

American basketball player

No. 11 – Kyoto Hannaryz
- Position: Forward
- League: B.League

Personal information
- Born: July 12, 1990 (age 36)
- Listed height: 6 ft 5 in (1.96 m)
- Listed weight: 209 lb (95 kg)

Career information
- High school: Century (Hillsboro, Oregon)
- College: Clackamas CC (2008–2010); Portland State (2010–2012)
- NBA draft: 2012: undrafted
- Playing career: 2012–present

Career history
- 2012: Salem Soldiers
- 2012–2013: AS Souleuvre
- 2013: Vancouver Volcanoes
- 2014: Rockhampton Rockets
- 2014–2015: Bambitious Nara
- 2015–2016: Oita Ehime Heat Devils
- 2016–2017: Kagawa Five Arrows
- 2017–2018: Ehime Orange Vikings
- 2018–2019: Kumamoto Volters
- 2019–2020: Ehime Orange Vikings
- 2020–2025: Ibaraki Robots
- 2025–present: Kyoto Hannaryz

Career highlights
- QBL MVP (2014); 3× B.League scoring leader (2018–2020); First-team All-Big Sky (2012)

Chehales Centurion Tapscott (born July 20, 1990), nicknamed Chey, is an American professional basketball player for Kyoto Hannaryz of the Japanese B.League. He played college basketball for Clackamas Community College, and the Portland State Vikings. Tapscott was selected 61st overall in the 2013 NBA Development League Draft by the Maine Red Claws.

== Career statistics ==
Legend
GP	Games played	GS	Games started	MPG	Minutes per game
FG%	Field goal percentage	3P%	3-point field goal percentage	FT%	Free throw percentage
RPG	Rebounds per game	APG	Assists per game	SPG	Steals per game
BPG	Blocks per game	PPG	Points per game	**Bold**	Career high

*	Led the league

Year	Team	GP	GS	MPG	FG%	3P%	FT%	RPG	APG	SPG	BPG	PPG
2014–15	Nara	52		35.2	.499	.293	.663	9.4	2.5	1.5	0.7	18.5
2015–16	Oita	50	50	36.5	.513	.366	.735	12.0	3.1	2.1	0.5	22.7
2016–17	Kagawa	59	57	29.3	.451	.309	.716	9.3	3.2	1.8	0.7	19.5
2017–18	Ehime	60		29.0	.492	.317	.792	9.3	4.1	1.1	0.6	22.1
