= 1990–91 Idaho Vandals men's basketball team =

American college basketball season

1990–91 Idaho Vandals men's basketball
- Conference: Big Sky Conference
- Record: 19–11 (11–5 Big Sky)
- Head coach: Larry Eustachy (1st season)
- Assistant coach: Steve Barnes (3rd season)
- Home arena: Kibbie Dome

1990–91 Big Sky men's basketball standings
	Conf.				Overall
Team	W		L	PCT	W		L	PCT
Montana †	13	–	3	.813	23	–	8	.742
Nevada	12	–	4	.750	17	–	14	.548
Idaho	11	–	5	.688	19	–	11	.633
Boise State	10	–	6	.625	17	–	10	.630
Idaho State	7	–	9	.438	11	–	18	.379
Weber State	7	–	9	.438	12	–	16	.429
Montana State	6	–	10	.375	12	–	16	.429
Eastern Washington	5	–	11	.313	11	–	16	.407
Northern Arizona	1	–	15	.063	4	–	23	.148
† Conference tournament winner

The 1990–91 Idaho Vandals men's basketball team represented the University of Idaho during the 1990–91 NCAA Division I men's basketball season. Members of the Big Sky Conference, the Vandals were led by first-year head coach Larry Eustachy and played their home games on campus at the Kibbie Dome in Moscow, Idaho.

The Vandals were 17–10 overall in the regular season and 11–5 in conference play, third place in the league standings.

At the conference tournament in Missoula, the Vandals defeated second-seed Nevada by nineteen points in the semifinals and were on the verge of a third consecutive title, but lost by eight points in the final to host Montana.

== Postseason results ==
Date time, TV	Rank^{#}	Opponent^{#}	Result	Record	Site (attendance) city, state
Big Sky tournament
Wed, March 6; 5:30 pm	(3)	vs. (6) Weber State; Quarterfinal	W 60–54	18–10	Dahlberg Arena (3,500); Missoula, Montana
Fri, March 8; 5:30 pm	(3)	vs. (2) Nevada; Semifinal	W 93–74	19–10	Dahlberg Arena (6,056); Missoula, Montana
Sat, March 9; 6:07 pm, ESPN	(3)	at (1) Montana; Final	L 68–76	19–11	Dahlberg Arena (7,156); Missoula, Montana
*Non-conference game. (#) Tournament seedings in parentheses. All times are in Pacific time.
