= 1990–91 Boise State Broncos men's basketball team =

American college basketball season

1990–91 Boise State Broncos men's basketball
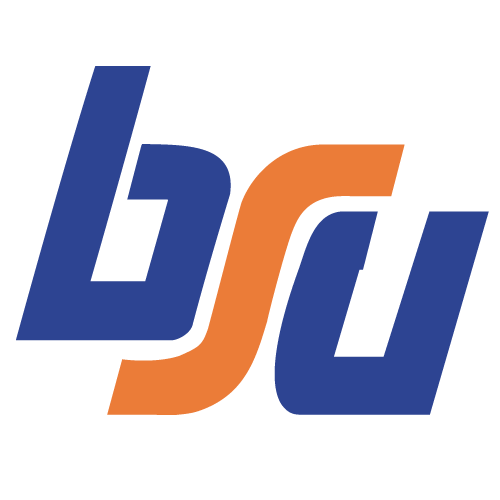

National Invitation Tournament, First round
- Conference: Big Sky Conference
- Record: 17–10 (10–6 Big Sky)
- Head coach: Bobby Dye (8th season)
- Assistant coach: Rod Jensen
- Home arena: BSU Pavilion

1990–91 Big Sky men's basketball standings
	Conf.				Overall
Team	W		L	PCT	W		L	PCT
Montana †	13	–	3	.813	23	–	8	.742
Nevada	12	–	4	.750	17	–	14	.548
Idaho	11	–	5	.688	19	–	11	.633
Boise State	10	–	6	.625	17	–	10	.630
Idaho State	7	–	9	.438	11	–	18	.379
Weber State	7	–	9	.438	12	–	16	.429
Montana State	6	–	10	.375	12	–	16	.429
Eastern Washington	5	–	11	.313	11	–	16	.407
Northern Arizona	1	–	15	.063	4	–	23	.148
† Conference tournament winner

The 1990–91 Boise State Broncos men's basketball team represented Boise State University during the 1990–91 NCAA Division I men's basketball season. The Broncos were led by eighth-year head coach Bobby Dye and played their home games on campus at the BSU Pavilion in Boise, Idaho.

They finished the regular season at 17–8 overall, with a 10–6 record in the Big Sky Conference, fourth in the standings.

In the conference tournament at Missoula, Montana, the fourth-seeded Broncos lost by four points to fifth seed Idaho State in the quarterfinals. Boise State received a bid to the National Invitation Tournament (NIT) and hosted a first round game, but lost to Southern Illinois by a point.

== Postseason results ==
Date time, TV	Rank^{#}	Opponent^{#}	Result	Record	Site (attendance) city, state
Big Sky tournament
Wed, March 6; 9:00 pm	(4)	vs. (5) Idaho State; Quarterfinal	L 69–73	17–9	BSU Pavilion (4,205); Boise, Idaho
National Invitation tournament
Wed, March 13*; 8:30 pm		Southern Illinois; First round	L 74–75	17–10	BSU Pavilion (8,577); Boise, Idaho
*Non-conference game. ^{#}Rankings from AP poll. (#) Tournament seedings in parentheses. All times are in Mountain time.
