= Mike Adras =

American college basketball coach

Biographical details
- Born: June 25, 1961 (age 65); Las Vegas, Nevada, U.S.

Coaching career (HC unless noted)
- 1982–1983: UC Santa Barbara (assistant)
- 1983–1984: San Jose State (assistant)
- 1984–1986: Bishop Gorman HS (assistant)
- 1986–1991: Bishop Gorman HS
- 1991–1992: Drake (assistant)
- 1992–1999: Northern Arizona (assistant)
- 1999–2011: Northern Arizona

Head coaching record
- Overall: 193–170 (college)

Accomplishments and honors

Championships
- Big Sky tournament (2000); Big Sky regular Season (2006)

Awards
- Big Sky Coach of the Year (2006)

Mike Adras (born June 25, 1961) is an American college basketball coach. He most recently was the head men's basketball coach at Northern Arizona University. He was promoted from assistant coach after the 1998–99 season, when Ben Howland left for Pittsburgh.

Adras abruptly resigned on December 9, 2011, nine games into the 2011–12 season. A month later, the Arizona Daily Sun revealed that during the summer of 2010, an internal investigation by NAU found numerous alleged violations of NCAA and NAU rules in the basketball program, including evidence that Adras had falsified practice logs.
