= 2008 Big Sky Conference men's basketball tournament =

- Classification: Division I
- Season: 2007–08
- Teams: 6
- First round site: campus sites
- Semifinals site: Rose Garden; Portland, Oregon
- Finals site: Rose Garden; Portland, Oregon
- Champions: Portland State (1st title)
- Winning coach: Ken Bone (1st title)
- MVP: Deonte Huff (Portland State)

2007–08 Big Sky men's basketball standings
	Conf.				Overall
Team	W		L	PCT	W		L	PCT
Portland State †	14	–	2	.875	23	–	10	.697
Northern Arizona	11	–	5	.688	21	–	11	.656
Weber State	10	–	6	.625	16	–	14	.533
Montana	8	–	8	.500	14	–	16	.467
Idaho State	8	–	8	.500	12	–	19	.387
Montana State	7	–	9	.438	15	–	15	.500
Northern Colorado	6	–	10	.375	13	–	16	.448
Eastern Washington	6	–	10	.375	11	–	19	.367
Sacramento State	2	–	14	.125	4	–	24	.143
† 2008 Big Sky tournament winner Rankings from AP Poll

The 2008 Big Sky Conference men's basketball tournament took place from March 8–12, 2008. The first round was held at campus sites. The semifinals and finals took place at the Rose Garden in Portland, Oregon. Teams would be re-seeded, if necessary, for the semifinal round. Portland State won the tournament. As a result, they advanced to the NCAA tournament.

First Round; March 8
4	Idaho State	67
5	Montana	65
(Pairings are reseeded after the first round)
3	Weber State	65
6	Montana State	49

Semifinals; March 11
1	Portland State	72
4	Idaho State	61
3	Weber State	70
2	Northern Arizona	75

Championship; March 12
1	Portland State	67
2	Northern Arizona	51

== Sources ==
- Field Set for Men's Tourney
