= Freeman Williams =

American basketball player (1956–2022)

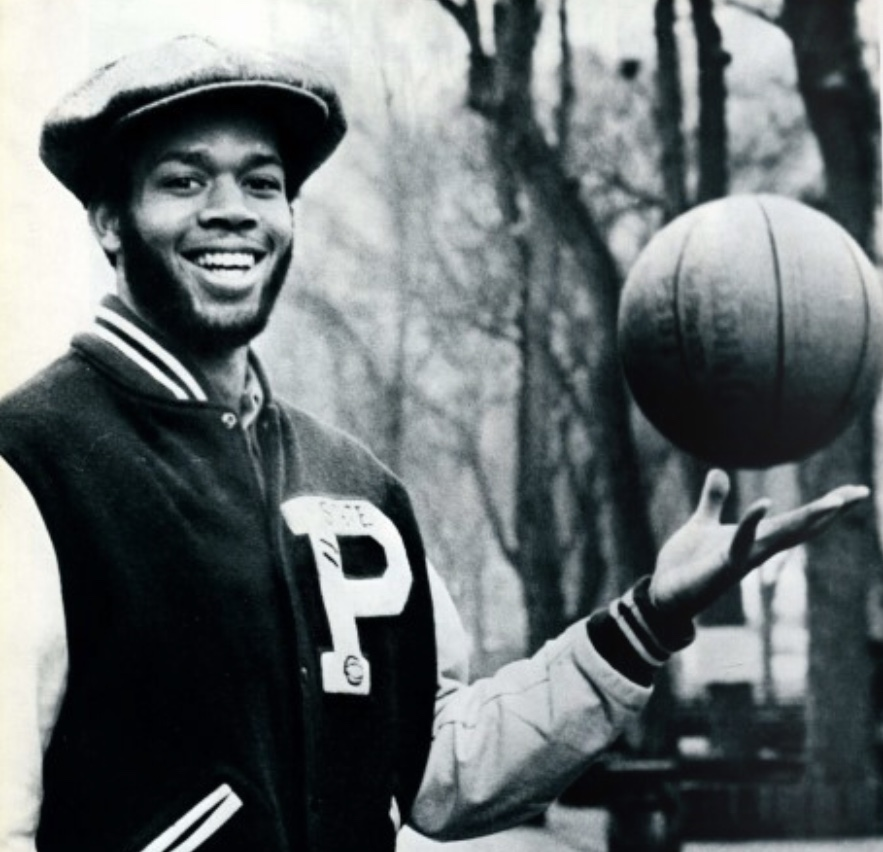
- Williams as a senior at PSU

Personal information
- Born: May 15, 1956 Los Angeles, California, U.S.
- Died: April 19, 2022 (aged 65) Los Angeles, California, U.S.
- Listed height: 6 ft 4 in (1.93 m)
- Listed weight: 190 lb (86 kg)

Career information
- High school: Manual Arts (Los Angeles, California)
- College: Portland State (1974–1978)
- NBA draft: 1978: 1st round, 8th overall pick
- Drafted by: Boston Celtics
- Playing career: 1978–1993
- Position: Shooting guard / small forward
- Number: 20, 5

Career history
- 1978–1982: San Diego Clippers
- 1982: Atlanta Hawks
- 1982: Utah Jazz
- 1984–1986: Tampa Bay Thrillers
- 1985–1986: Washington Bullets
- 1987: Tanduay Rhum Masters
- 1987–1988: Pensacola Tornados
- 1993: Miami Tropics

Career highlights
- CBA champion (1985); CBA Playoff/Finals MVP (1985); Consensus second-team All-American (1978); Third-team All-American – AP, UPI (1977); 2× NCAA scoring champion (1977, 1978)

Career NBA statistics
- Points: 4,738 (14.7 ppg)
- Rebounds: 510 (1.6 rpg)
- Assists: 516 (1.6 apg)
- Stats at NBA.com
- Stats at Basketball Reference

Freeman Williams Jr. (May 15, 1956 – April 19, 2022) was an American professional basketball player in the National Basketball Association (NBA). He played college basketball for the Portland State Vikings, where he was a two-time All-American and twice led the nation in scoring. He began his NBA career playing 2 1/2 years with the San Diego Clippers, and also had stints with the Atlanta Hawks, Utah Jazz and Washington Bullets.

== College career ==
Williams attended Portland State University, where he became the school's all-time scoring leader. He was the NCAA scoring champion in 1977 and 1978, and a consensus second-team All-American in 1978. He is third in Division I history in career scoring, trailing only Pete Maravich and Antoine Davis.

== Professional career ==
Williams was a 1978 first round draft pick (8th overall) by the Boston Celtics. His pro playing career started in 1978 with the San Diego Clippers. On January 19, 1980, Williams scored 51 points in a game against the Phoenix Suns. In December 1980, Freeman became the first Clippers player to win a Player of the Month award, and the only one in franchise history until Elton Brand did so 25 years later. He finished in the top 10 in three-point field goals for three consecutive seasons from 1980 through 1982. In the middle of the 1981-82 season, the Clippers traded Williams to the Atlanta Hawks for Al Wood and Charlie Criss.

In September 1982, Williams was traded along with John Drew and cash to the Utah Jazz in exchange for Dominique Wilkins, who was drafted by the Jazz and refused to sign. After that season (1982–83), Williams only played in 27 more games: 18 with Utah in 1983 and nine with the Washington Bullets in 1986.

Williams played in the Continental Basketball Association (CBA) for the Tampa Bay Thrillers from 1984 to 1986 and the Pensacola Tornados during the 1987–88 season. He won a CBA championship with the Thrillers in 1985. He was selected as the CBA Playoff/Finals Most Valuable Player in 1985.

In 1987, Williams played in the Philippine Basketball Association (PBA) for the Tanduay Rhum Masters, where he famously scored 82 points, including 10 three-pointers, in one game.

== Personal life ==
Freeman had a small part in the 1992 film White Men Can't Jump, playing fictional playground legend Duck Johnson.

During and after his playing career, Williams struggled with substance abuse issues. After his professional basketball career ended, he became close friends with John Lucas II, who also struggled with substance abuse, and Lucas became a mentor of sorts to Williams.

Williams died on April 19, 2022. He was 65. He was buried at Inglewood Park Cemetery.

== Career statistics ==
Legend
GP	Games played	GS	Games started	MPG	Minutes per game
FG%	Field goal percentage	3P%	3-point field goal percentage	FT%	Free throw percentage
RPG	Rebounds per game	APG	Assists per game	SPG	Steals per game
BPG	Blocks per game	PPG	Points per game	**Bold**	Career high

=== NBA ===
==== Regular season ====
Year	Team	GP	GS	MPG	FG%	3P%	FT%	RPG	APG	SPG	BPG	PPG
1978–79	San Diego	72		16.6	**.490**		.776	1.4	1.2	.6	.0	10.2
1979–80	San Diego	**82**		**25.8**	.480	.328	.815	**2.3**	**2.0**	.9	**.1**	18.6
1980–81	San Diego	**82**		24.1	.465	.340	**.852**	1.6	**2.0**	**1.1**	**.1**	**19.3**
1981–82	San Diego	37	**10**	21.8	.456	.324	.843	1.4	1.8	.6	.0	16.5
1981–82	Atlanta	23	0	8.2	.382	.200	.846	.5	.8	.3	.0	4.8
1982–83	Utah	18	3	11.7	.356	.286	.720	.9	.6	.3	**.1**	5.1
1985–86	Washington	9	0	12.2	.373	**.500**	.706	1.3	.8	.8	**.1**	7.7
Career		323	13	20.5	.467	.331	.824	1.6	1.6	.8	.1	14.7

==== Playoffs ====
Year	Team	GP	MPG	FG%	3P%	FT%	RPG	APG	SPG	BPG	PPG
1982	Atlanta	1	4.0	.000	.000	–	.0	.0	.0	.0	.0

== See also ==
- List of NCAA Division I men's basketball players with 60 or more points in a game
- List of NCAA Division I men's basketball season scoring leaders
- List of NCAA Division I men's basketball career scoring leaders
