= 2009 Big Sky Conference men's basketball tournament =

- Classification: Division I
- Season: 2008–09
- Teams: 6
- First round site: campus sites
- Semifinals site: Dee Events Center; Ogden, UT
- Finals site: Dee Events Center; Ogden, UT
- Champions: Portland State (2nd title)
- Winning coach: Ken Bone (2nd title)
- MVP: Jeremiah Dominguez (Portland State)

2008–09 Big Sky men's basketball standings
	Conf.				Overall
Team	W		L	PCT	W		L	PCT
Weber State	15	–	1	.938	21	–	10	.677
Portland State †	11	–	5	.688	23	–	10	.697
Montana	11	–	5	.688	17	–	12	.586
Idaho State	9	–	7	.563	13	–	19	.406
Northern Colorado	8	–	8	.500	14	–	18	.438
Montana State	6	–	10	.375	14	–	17	.452
Eastern Washington	6	–	10	.375	12	–	18	.400
Northern Arizona	5	–	11	.313	8	–	19	.296
Sacramento State	1	–	15	.063	2	–	27	.069
† 2009 Big Sky tournament winner Rankings from AP Poll

The Big Sky Conference men's basketball tournament took place from March 7–11, 2009. The winner, Portland State, advanced to the NCAA tournament. Teams were re-seeded after the first round.

First Round; March 7
3	Montana	54
6	Montana State	56
(Pairings are reseeded after the first round)
4	Idaho State	67
5	Northern Colorado	60

Seeded Semifinals; March 10
1	Weber State	61
6	Montana State	70
4	Idaho State	53
2	Portland State	61

Championship; March 11
6	Montana State	77
2	Portland State	79

== Sources ==
- Big Sky Conference – MBB Notes
