= 1990–91 Montana Grizzlies basketball team =

American college basketball season

1990–91 Montana Grizzlies basketball

Big Sky champions

NCAA tournament
- Conference: Big Sky Conference
- Record: 23–8 (13–3 Big Sky)
- Head coach: Stew Morrill (5th season)
- Assistant coach: Blaine Taylor (7th season)
- Home arena: Adams Fieldhouse

1990–91 Big Sky men's basketball standings
	Conf.				Overall
Team	W		L	PCT	W		L	PCT
Montana †	13	–	3	.813	23	–	8	.742
Nevada	12	–	4	.750	17	–	14	.548
Idaho	11	–	5	.688	19	–	11	.633
Boise State	10	–	6	.625	17	–	10	.630
Idaho State	7	–	9	.438	11	–	18	.379
Weber State	7	–	9	.438	12	–	16	.429
Montana State	6	–	10	.375	12	–	16	.429
Eastern Washington	5	–	11	.313	11	–	16	.407
Northern Arizona	1	–	15	.063	4	–	23	.148
† Conference tournament winner

The 1990–91 Montana Grizzlies basketball team represented the University of Montana during the 1990–91 NCAA Division I basketball season. The Grizzlies were led by fifth-year head coach Stew Morrill and played their home games on campus at Adams Fieldhouse in Missoula, Montana.

They finished the regular season at 21–7, with a 13–3 record in conference to win the regular season title. The Grizzlies earned an automatic berth in the NCAA tournament by winning the Big Sky Conference tournament.

In the opening round of the NCAA Tournament at McKale Center in Tucson, Arizona, Montana faced the top-ranked, defending national champion UNLV Runnin' Rebels. Jerry Tarkanian's UNLV squad entered the game with a 30–0 mark on the season and, dating back to the previous season, a 41–game winning streak overall and wins in 51 of their previous 52 games. The Grizzlies were beaten soundly, 99–65.

== Postseason results ==
Date time, TV	Rank^{#}	Opponent^{#}	Result	Record	Site (attendance) city, state
Big Sky tournament
Mar 8, 1991*	(1)	(5) Idaho State; Semifinal	W 109–97	22–7	Adams Fieldhouse; Missoula, Montana
Mar 9, 1991*	(1)	(3) Idaho; Championship Game	W 76–68	23–7	Adams Fieldhouse; Missoula, Montana
NCAA tournament
Mar 15, 1991*	(16 W)	vs. (1 W) No. 1 UNLV; First Round	L 65–99	23–8	McKale Center (13,367); Tucson, Arizona
*Non-conference game. ^{#}Rankings from AP Poll. (#) Tournament seedings in parentheses. W=West. All times are in Mountain time.
