= Jeremiah Dominguez =

American basketball player and coach

Personal information
- Born: June 13, 1985 (age 41) Silverton, Oregon, U.S.
- Listed height: 5 ft 6 in (1.68 m)
- Listed weight: 150 lb (68 kg)

Career information
- High school: South Salem (Salem, Oregon)
- College: Portland (2004–2006); Portland State (2008–2009)
- NBA draft: 2009: undrafted
- Playing career: 2009–2015
- Position: Guard
- Number: 11, 5
- Coaching career: 2022–2022

Career history

Playing
- 2016: Abejas de León

Coaching
- 2022: Salem Capitals

Career highlights
- Big Sky Player of the Year (2008); 2× First-team All-Big Sky (2008); Big Sky Newcomer of the Year (2008); Big Sky tournament MVP (2009)

Jeremiah Dominguez (born June 13, 1985) is an American former professional basketball player who is the assistant coach of the Salem Capitals of The Basketball League.

== High school career ==
As a high school player at South Salem High School in 2004, Dominguez was named the Oregon Player of the Year by The Oregonian. He helped the Saxons to the class 4A State Championship over Redmond High School and Oregon Ducks star Maarty Leunen At South Salem he was a 2 time Valley League player of the year.

== College career ==
Dominguez spent the first two years of his college career at the University of Portland before transferring to Portland State. He sat out the 2006–07 season due to transfer rules. As a junior, he averaged 14.2 points, 4.1 assists and nearly two steals during the 2007–2008 season.

He played point guard for the Portland State Vikings men's basketball team. Dominguez, despite a listed height of 5'6", was named as the Big Sky Conference 2007-2008 Men's Basketball Most Valuable Player following his junior season. The Vikings also qualified for the NCAA men's basketball tournament for the first time in school history. In 2009, Dominguez again led the Vikings to the NCAA tournament where they earned a 13 seed and lost to 4 seed Xavier in the first round. Dominguez scored 13 points in the game.
