= Julius Thomas =

American football player (born 1988)

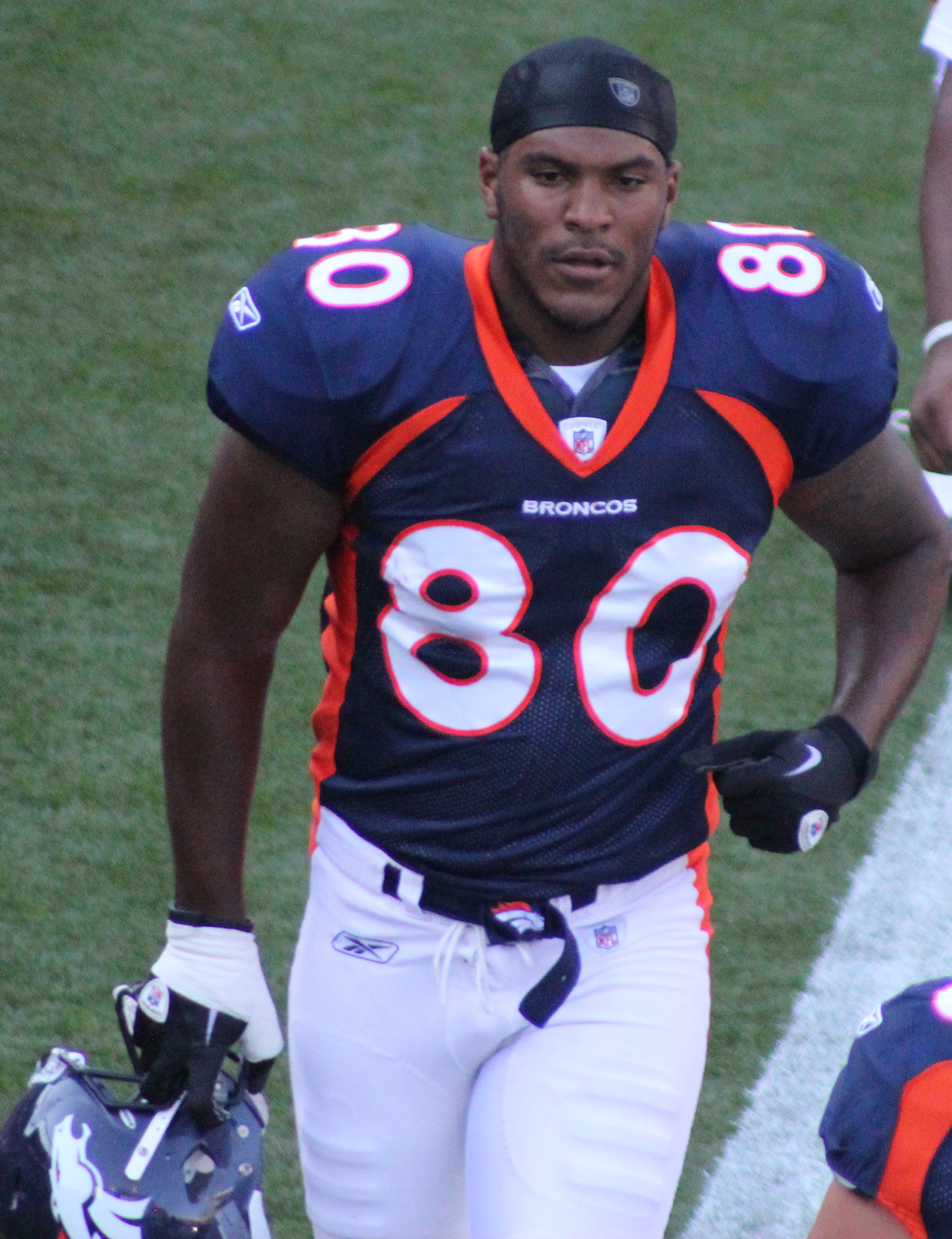
- Thomas with the Denver Broncos in 2011

No. 80, 89
- Position: Tight end

Personal information
- Born: June 27, 1988 (age 38); Stockton, California, U.S.
- Listed height: 6 ft 5 in (1.96 m)
- Listed weight: 262 lb (119 kg)

Career information
- High school: Tokay (Lodi, California)
- College: Portland State (2010)
- NFL draft: 2011: 4th round, 129th overall pick

Career history
- Denver Broncos (2011–2014); Jacksonville Jaguars (2015–2016); Miami Dolphins (2017)

Awards and highlights
- 2× Pro Bowl (2013, 2014)

Career NFL statistics
- Receptions: 226
- Receiving yards: 2,406
- Receiving touchdowns: 36
- Stats at Pro Football Reference

Julius Dewayne Thomas (born June 27, 1988) is an American former professional football player who was a tight end in the National Football League (NFL). He played college football and basketball at Portland State, and was selected by the Denver Broncos in the fourth round of the 2011 NFL draft. He also played for the Jacksonville Jaguars and Miami Dolphins.

== Early life ==
Thomas is the son of Greg and Toria Thomas. He has two brothers, Trenton and Marcus. Thomas graduated from Tokay High School in Lodi, California. Thomas graduated from Portland State University in Portland, Oregon, with a bachelor's degree in Business Administration.

== College career ==
While at Portland State, Thomas was a First-team All-Big Sky Conference selection in football in 2010. He finished the season with 29 receptions for 453 yards and two touchdowns for Portland State's football team. Thomas had not played collegiate football prior to 2010.

Thomas played four seasons for the Portland State basketball team. During his collegiate basketball career, Thomas set school records for career games played (121), career wins (78), and career field goals percentage (.663), and also participated on one Big Sky regular season championship team and two Big Sky tournament championship teams as well two NCAA Tournaments (2008 and 2009). He was twice named to the Big Sky All-Tournament team. As a senior, he averaged 10.8 points, 5.9 rebounds, and shot a school-record .671 from the field.

== Professional career ==
Pre-draft measurables
Height	Weight	Arm length	Hand span	Wingspan	40-yard dash	10-yard split	20-yard split	20-yard shuttle	Three-cone drill	Vertical jump	Broad jump	Bench press
6 ft 4 5/8 in (1.95 m)	246 lb (112 kg)	33 in (0.84 m)	10 1/4 in (0.26 m)	6 ft 7 3/8 in (2.02 m)	4.68 s	1.64 s	2.74 s	4.31 s	6.96 s	35.5 in (0.90 m)	9 ft 3 in (2.82 m)	16 reps
All values from NFL Combine

=== Denver Broncos ===
==== 2011 season ====
Thomas was selected in the fourth round with the 129th overall pick by the Denver Broncos in the 2011 NFL draft. He was the highest selected Portland State Viking since quarterback Neil Lomax was selected in the second round by the St. Louis Cardinals in 1980. His rookie contract was four years and $2,420,000 through the 2014 season. It included a $384,000 signing bonus.

In his first NFL season, Thomas had only one catch as he battled various injuries. He appeared in five games on the season. Thomas's lone catch, which came from quarterback Kyle Orton, came on September 18 against the Cincinnati Bengals.

==== 2012 season ====
Thomas did not record any statistics in the 2012 season. He only appeared in four games.

==== 2013 season ====
Thomas erupted onto the scene in the 2013 season. He scored his first and second career touchdowns in the season opener against the Baltimore Ravens on September 5, 2013, having a five catch, 110-yard, two-touchdown breakout performance. Both of Thomas's touchdowns came from quarterback Peyton Manning. He followed up this performance in Week 2 with a six-catch, 47-yard performance that ended with a game-sealing touchdown against the New York Giants. In Week 3, he continued his scoring streak against the Oakland Raiders with three receptions for 37 yards and a touchdown. Thomas played his best game of the season in Week 5, catching nine passes for 122 yards and two touchdowns in a 51–48 shootout win against the Dallas Cowboys. On October 13, he had four receptions for 22 yards and a touchdown against the Jacksonville Jaguars. On October 20, he had five receptions for 41 yards and a touchdown against the Indianapolis Colts. On November 10, 2013, he had three receptions for 96 yards and a touchdown against the San Diego Chargers. In Week 16, in a win over the Houston Texans, Thomas caught a touchdown from Peyton Manning, which was his 51st touchdown pass of the season, which set a single season record.

Thomas ended the season with 12 touchdown receptions, the most by any Denver Broncos tight end. Thomas and the Broncos reached Super Bowl XLVIII, where he had four receptions for 27 yards, but lost 43–8 to the Seattle Seahawks.

==== 2014 season ====
In the first game of the 2014 season, the Broncos hosted the Indianapolis Colts. During that game, Thomas caught three first-half touchdown passes from quarterback Peyton Manning, tying former Bronco Shannon Sharpe's franchise record for the most touchdowns by a tight end in a single season game. The Broncos went on to win the game by a score of 31–24. In the next game, he had four receptions for 39 yards and a touchdown against the Kansas City Chiefs. In a Super Bowl XLVIII rematch in the following game, he had three receptions for 17 yards and a touchdown in an overtime loss to the Seattle Seahawks. On October 5, he had six receptions for 66 yards and two touchdowns against the Arizona Cardinals. His first score was Peyton Manning's 500th career touchdown pass. Three days later, Thomas was fined $8,000 for a chop block on Cardinals defensive end Calais Campbell. On October 12, against the New York Jets, he had two receptions for 44 yards and two touchdowns, which tied Calvin Johnson's record of nine touchdowns through the first five games of a season. On November 2, he had two receptions for 33 yards and a touchdown against the New England Patriots. On November 9, he had six receptions for 63 yards and two touchdowns against the Oakland Raiders.

Although his numbers in receptions and yards dropped from the previous season, Thomas recorded 12 touchdowns for the second straight season.

Thomas and the Broncos made the playoffs in the 2014 season. They fell to the Indianapolis Colts in the Divisional Round 24–13. Thomas had six receptions for 53 yards in the loss.

=== Jacksonville Jaguars ===
==== 2015 season ====
On March 10, 2015, Thomas signed a five-year, $46 million contract with the Jacksonville Jaguars.

On October 18, Thomas had seven receptions for 78 yards and a touchdown against the Houston Texans. On November 19, his five-yard touchdown catch was the game-winner in Jacksonville's 19–13 victory over the Tennessee Titans. On November 29, he had nine receptions for 116 yards and a touchdown against the San Diego Chargers. On December 6, he had two receptions for 15 yards and a touchdown in another game against the Titans. On December 13, he had five receptions for 54 yards and a touchdown against the Indianapolis Colts.

On the season, Thomas totaled 45 receptions for 455 yards and five touchdowns.

==== 2016 season ====
Thomas started his second season in Jacksonville with five receptions for 64 yards and a touchdown against the Green Bay Packers on September 11. On October 23, he had three receptions for 20 yards and a touchdown against the Oakland Raiders. On October 27, he had three receptions for 28 yards and a touchdown against the Tennessee Titans. On November 13, he had six receptions for 24 yards and a touchdowns against the Houston Texans. He was placed on injured reserve on December 10, 2016, after missing two games with a back injury.

In the 2016 season, Thomas played in nine games with six starts recording 30 receptions for 281 yards and four touchdowns.

=== Miami Dolphins ===
The Jaguars traded Thomas to the Miami Dolphins for the 240th overall pick (Marquez Williams) in the 2017 NFL draft, where he signed a new two-year contract. He was placed on injured reserve on December 20, 2017. He played in 14 games with 12 starts, recording 41 catches for 388 yards for three touchdowns.

On March 14, 2018, Thomas was released by the Dolphins.

== Post-playing career ==
On August 24, 2018, Thomas announced his retirement from the NFL to pursue a doctorate in psychology. He is currently studying clinical health psychology at Nova Southeastern University. In addition, he joined Psychology Services Center at Nova Southeastern University in 2020 In 2019, Thomas became the player advisory board member in the Football Players health Study Department at Harvard University. Later in 2021, he joined Memorial Rehabilitation Institute, providing clinical psychology and neuropsychological services.

In January 2022, he co-founded NESTRE Health and Performance, a neuro-strength solutions company, where he also works as chief health and performance innovation officer. As of 2024, Thomas is the vice president of the Society for Sports Neuroscience. The society works for scientists and practitioners in furthering research-based athletic performance and brain health.

== NFL career statistics ==
Year	Team	GP	Receiving				
Year	Team	GP	Rec	Yds	Avg	Lng	TD
2011	DEN	5	1	5	5.0	5	0
2012	DEN	4	0	0	0.0	0	0
2013	DEN	14	65	788	12.1	74	12
2014	DEN	13	43	489	11.4	35	12
2015	JAX	12	46	455	9.9	34	5
2016	JAX	9	30	281	9.4	24	4
2017	MIA	14	41	388	9.5	27	3
Total		67	226	2,406	10.6	74	36

== Personal life ==
Thomas is a Christian.
