= Scott Morrison (basketball player) =

Canadian basketball player

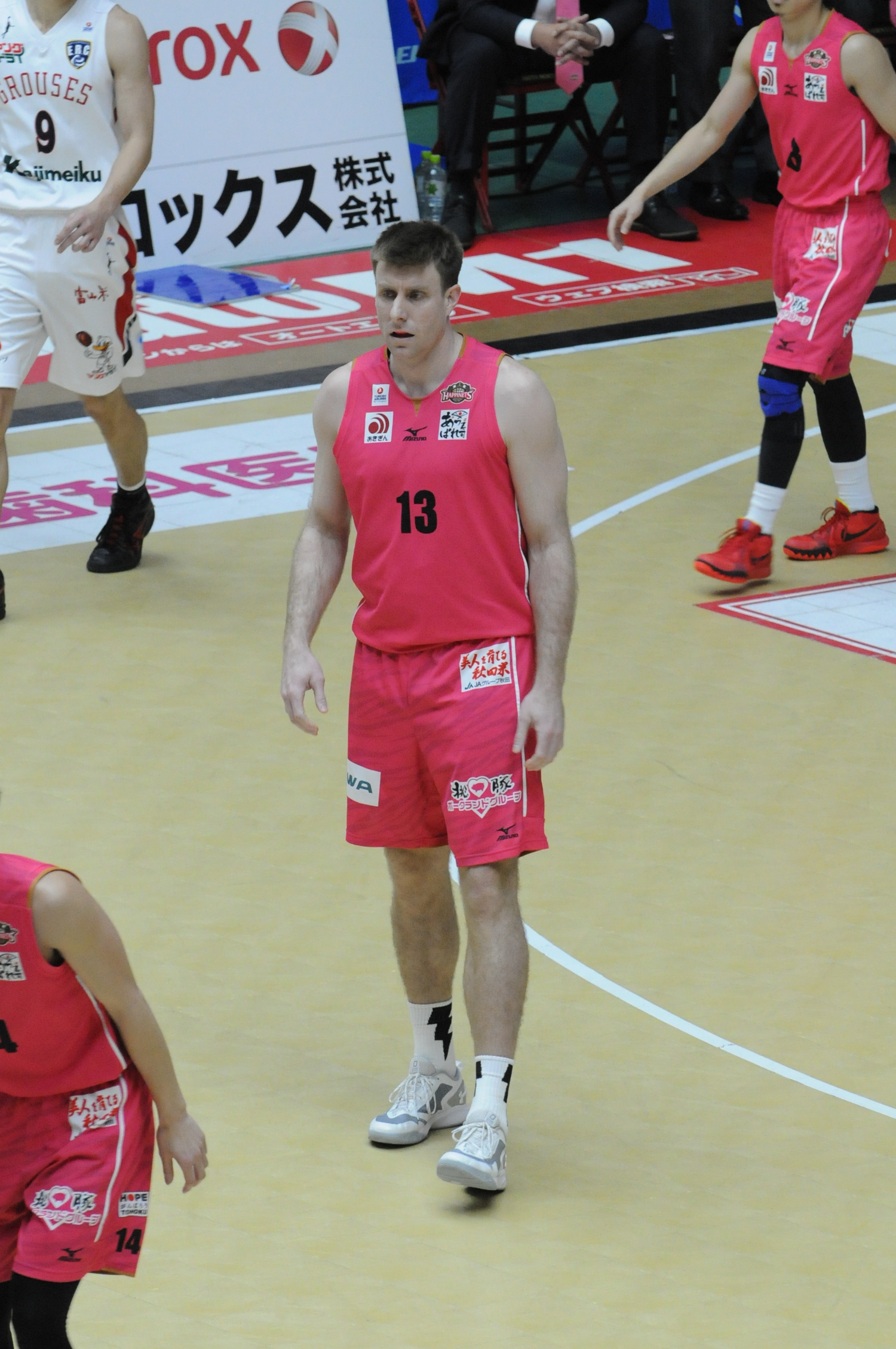

Personal information
- Born: January 3, 1986 (age 40) North Vancouver, British Columbia, Canada
- Listed height: 6 ft 11 in (2.11 m)
- Listed weight: 247 lb (112 kg)

Career information
- High school: Argyle Secondary School (North Vancouver, British Columbia)
- College: Portland State (2004–2008)
- NBA draft: 2008: undrafted
- Playing career: 2008–2019
- Position: Center

Career history
- 2008–2009: Albacomp
- 2009: Vancouver Titans
- 2009–2010: Tartu Ülikool/Rock
- 2010–2011: BC Politekhnika-Halychyna
- 2011: KK Włocławek
- 2011–2012: Czarni Słupsk
- 2012–2013: Eisbären Bremerhaven
- 2013–2014: Melbourne Tigers
- 2014–2015: Aisin SeaHorses Mikawa
- 2015–2017: Akita Northern Happinets
- 2017–2018: San-en NeoPhoenix
- 2018: Kumamoto Volters
- 2019: Ryukyu Golden Kings

Career highlights
- National Basketball League (Japan) champion (2015); Estonian champion (2010); JCB Cup winner (2009); Big Sky Defensive Player of the Year (2008); Provincial AAA basketball champion (2004)

Scott Morrison (born January 3, 1986), nicknamed "Scomo", is a Canadian former professional basketball player who last played for Ryukyu Golden Kings of the B.League. Morrison played the center position.

== College career ==
At the age of 18, he moved to America and began his college career in Portland State University. He averaged 9.2 points and 5.6 rebounds for Vikings and still holds the school records for blocked shots and dunks, and top 5 all time in PSU rebound history. He was also a part of two Big Sky Conference champions team and was the conference's Defensive Player of the Year in 2007-08.

== College statistics ==
Year	Team	GP	GS	MPG	FG%	3P%	FT%	RPG	APG	SPG	BPG	PPG
2004-05	Portland State	28	26	19.1	.588	.000	.547	4.57	0.57	0.43	1.04	5.54
2005-06	Portland State	27	17	22.0	.455	.000	.623	5.33	1.07	0.37	1.30	9.30
2006-07	Portland State	32	28	24.7	.569	.000	.596	6.47	1.03	0.81	2.19	11.19
2007-08	Portland State	32	30	23.8	.575	.000	.633	5.84	1.06	0.69	1.66	10.44
Career		119	101	22.5	.543	.000	.607	5.60	0.94	0.59	1.57	9.23

=== NCAA Awards & Honors ===
- All-Big Sky Second Team - 2008
- Big Sky Defensive POY - 2008

== Professional career ==
In 2008 Morrison signed with the Albacomp of Hungary, then subsequently spent seasons playing for teams in Canada, Estonia, Ukraine, Poland and Germany. In July 2013 he signed with the Melbourne Tigers for the 2013-14 season of the Australian NBL. He has often worn a black mask to protect his nose since having it broken twice in February 2014, in separate matches against the Perth Wildcats and Adelaide 36ers. In September 2014 he signed with the Aisin Seahorses Mikawa of the Japanese NBL. After spending one season with the Seahorses, Morrison was signed by the Akita Northern Happinets of the bj league, a rival league to the NBL, in August 2015. He signed for a second season with the Happinets in August 2016, who had joined the first division of the new B.League that was formed from the off-season merger of the NBL and bj league. Morrison suffered a broken cheek bone in October 2016 and subsequently started using a new mask.

== Personal ==
Morrison was a Health Sciences major in Portland State. His father Alex and brother Steve also play basketball.

== Career statistics ==
Legend
GP	Games played	GS	Games started	MPG	Minutes per game
FG%	Field goal percentage	3P%	3-point field goal percentage	FT%	Free throw percentage
RPG	Rebounds per game	APG	Assists per game	SPG	Steals per game
BPG	Blocks per game	PPG	Points per game	**Bold**	Career high

=== Regular season ===
Year	Team	GP	GS	MPG	FG%	3P%	FT%	RPG	APG	SPG	BPG	PPG
2009-10	Tartu	21		21.7	.607	1.000	.620	6.8	1.1	0.7	0.9	11.4
2010-11	Politekhnika	32		27.4	.558	.000	.697	7.2	0.6	0.7	1.4	13.3
2010-11	Włocławek	6		8.3	.591	.000	.500	2.7	0.0	0.2	0.5	4.8
2011-12	Słupsk	38	37	22.6	.619	.000	.634	5.71	0.53	0.47	1.26	10.63
2012-13	Bremerhaven	34	30	23.9	.546	.000	.743	4.68	0.47	0.44	1.12	10.35
2013-14	Melbourne	31	25	26.4	.589	.000	.717	6.81	0.55	0.52	1.29	11.29
2014-15	Aisin	54	49	22.0	60.5	-	53.1	6.3	1.1	0.7	0.8	8.7
2015-16	Akita	50	50	26.4	57.1	0.0	69.7	8.3	2.0	0.8	0.7	11.1
2016-17	Akita	58	53	21.7	52.9	0.0	65.5	5.7	0.9	0.6	0.5	9.7
2017-18	San-en	59	29	21.9	58.0	0.0	54.5	5.9	0.9	0.4	0.3	9.6
2018-19	Kumamoto	7	7	31.3	50.9	0.0	52.8	7.7	1.4	0.4	0.9	11.0
2018-19	Ryukyu	8	7	31.3	50.0	0.0	38.2	8.2	1.8	0.1	0.1	6.6

=== Playoffs ===
Year	Team	GP	GS	MPG	FG%	3P%	FT%	RPG	APG	SPG	BPG	PPG
2009-10	Tartu	11		24.9	.590	.000	.773	6.2	1.3	0.6	1.7	12.0
2010-11	Włocławek	4		12.5	.600	.000	.400	3.8	0.0	0.8	0.5	3.5
2011-12	Słupsk	5		22.2	.742	.000	.692	6.0	1.0	0.6	1.6	11.0
2013-14	Melbourne	3		22.7	.800	.000	.545	5.0	0.0	1.7	0.3	10.0
2014-15	Mikawa	8		16.6	.630	.000	.543	4.0	0.6	0.5	0.5	5.4
2016-17	Akita	3	3	18.16	.647	.000	.778	4.7	0.0	0.6	0.6	9.7

=== Early cup games ===
Year	Team	GP	GS	MPG	FG%	3P%	FT%	RPG	APG	SPG	BPG	PPG
2017	San-en	2	2	28.12	.476	.000	.500	10.0	2.5	0.5	0.5	12.5
