= Montana Grizzlies basketball =

University of Montana men's basketball team

| 2026–27 Montana Grizzlies basketball team |
- University: University of Montana
- First season: 1901
- Head coach: Travis DeCuire (13th season)
- Location: Missoula, Montana
- Arena: Dahlberg Arena (capacity: 7,321)
- Conference: Big Sky
- Nickname: Grizzlies (Griz)
- Colors: Maroon and silver
- Student section: The Zoo
- All-time record: 1,348–1,169

NCAA Division I tournament Sweet Sixteen
- 1975

NCAA Division I tournament appearances
- 1975, 1991, 1992, 1997, 2002, 2005, 2006, 2010, 2012, 2013, 2018, 2019, 2025

Conference tournament champions
- 1991, 1992, 1997, 2002, 2005, 2006, 2010, 2012, 2013, 2018, 2019, 2025

Conference regular-season champions
- 1975, 1978, 1991, 1992, 1995, 2000, 2012, 2013, 2015, 2018, 2019, 2025

Uniforms
| Home | Away |

The Montana Grizzlies basketball team represents the University of Montana in men's college basketball. They compete at the NCAA Division I level and are members of the Big Sky Conference. Home games are played at Dahlberg Arena located inside the University of Montana's Adams Center. The Grizzlies have appeared in the NCAA Division I men's basketball tournament 13 times, most recently in 2025. Montana's best finish in the NCAA tournament was in 1975 when they appeared in the Sweet 16.

== Postseason results ==
=== NCAA tournament results ===
The Grizzlies have appeared in 13 NCAA tournaments, with a combined record of 2–14.

| Year | Seed | Round | Opponent | Result |
|---|---|---|---|---|
| 1975 | | Round of 32; Sweet Sixteen; Regional 3rd Place | Utah State #2 UCLA #16 UNLV | W 69–63; L 64–67; L 67–75 |
| 1991 | 16 W | Round of 64 | (1) #1 UNLV | L 65–99 |
| 1992 | 14 W | Round of 64 | (3) #20 Florida State | L 68–78 |
| 1997 | 16 W | Round of 64 | (1) #5 Kentucky | L 54–92 |
| 2002 | 15 M | Round of 64 | (2) #11 Oregon | L 62–81 |
| 2005 | 16 W | Round of 64 | (1) #8 Washington | L 77–88 |
| 2006 | 12 M | Round of 64; Round of 32 | (5) #20 Nevada (4} #7 Boston College | W 87–79; L 56–69 |
| 2010 | 14 E | Round of 64 | (3) #8 New Mexico | L 57–62 |
| 2012 | 13 E | Round of 64 | (4) #14 Wisconsin | L 49–73 |
| 2013 | 13 E | Round of 64 | (4) #16 Syracuse | L 34–81 |
| 2018 | 14 W | Round of 64 | (3) #7 Michigan | L 47–61 |
| 2019 | 15 W | Round of 64 | (2) #8 Michigan | L 55–74 |
| 2025 | 14 E | Round of 64 | (3) #13 Wisconsin | L 66–85 |

=== NIT results ===
The Grizzlies have appeared in four National Invitation Tournaments. Their combined record is 0–4.

| Year | Round | Opponent | Result |
|---|---|---|---|
| 1985 | First Round | UCLA | L 47–78 |
| 1986 | First Round | TCU | L 69–76 |
| 1995 | First Round | UTEP | L 60–90 |
| 2015 | First Round | Texas A&M | L 64–81 |

=== CBI results ===
The Grizzlies have appeared in three College Basketball Invitationals (CBI). Their combined record is 1–3.

| Year | Round | Opponent | Result |
|---|---|---|---|
| 2011 | First Round | Duquesne | L 76–87 |
| 2016 | First Round | Nevada | L 75–79 |
| 2024 | First Round | Presbyterian | W 82–79 |
| 2024 | Second Round | Arkansas State | L 74–61 |

== Career leaders ==
=== Points ===
| Player | Total |
|---|---|
| Krystkowiak, Larry | 2,017 |
| Richardson, Micheal Ray | 1,827 |
| Cope, Bob | 1,810 |
| Pridgett, Sayeed | 1,679 |
| Jamar, Kareem | 1,673 |
| Criswell, Kevin | 1,663 |
| Rorie, Ahmad | 1,654 |
| Oguine, Michael | 1,647 |
| Strait, Andrew | 1,617 |
| Tinkle, Wayne | 1,500 |
| Cherry, Will | 1,484 |
| Hasquet, Jordan | 1,396 |
| McKenzie, Ken | 1,321 |
| Samuelson, Shawn | 1,293 |
| Pope, Derrick | 1,289 |
| Rocheleau, Lou | 1,235 |
| Engellant, Daren | 1,224 |
| Davis, Charles | 1,214 |
| Kempfert, Matt | 1,131 |
| Spoja, Chris | 1,111 |
| Argenbright, Ed | 1,100 |
| Zanon, Craig | 1,071 |
| Zanon, Scott | 1,070 |
| Fasting, Roger | 1,047 |
| Warhank, Mike | 1,046 |
| Lake, Jeremy | 1,036 |
| Balko, Dan | 1,025 |
| Martin, Matt | 1,021 |
| Selvig, Doug | 1,000 |

=== Rebounds ===
| Player | Total |
|---|---|
| Krystkowiak, Larry | 1105 |
| Engellant, Daren | 874 |
| McKenzie, Ken | 859 |
| Tinkle, Wayne | 836 |
| Samuelson, Shawn | 791 |
| Sheriff, Russell | 788 |
| Lowry, Steve | 763 |
| Hasquet, Jordan | 718 |
| Strait, Andrew | 711 |
| Pope, Derrick | 675 |
| Richardson, Micheal Ray | 670 |
| Jamar, Kareem | 664 |

=== Assists ===
| Player | Total |
|---|---|
| DeCuire, Travis | 435 |
| Christensen, Shane | 431 |
| Zanon, Scott | 411 |
| Jamar, Kareem | 407 |
| Richardson, Micheal Ray | 372 |
| Glass, Marc | 369 |
| Camel, J. | 365 |
| Fastings, Roger | 363 |
| Selvig, Doug | 361 |
| Reed, Tony | 339 |
| Martin, Matt | 317 |

=== Steals ===
| Player | Total |
|---|---|
| J. Camel | 215 |

=== Blocks ===
| Player | Total |
|---|---|
| Brian Qvale | |

== Grizzlies in international leagues ==
- Josh Bannan (born 2001), in the National Basketball League
- Martin Breunig (born 1992), in the German Basketball Bundesliga
- Will Cherry (born 1991), in the Liga Nacional de Baloncesto Profesional
- Joirdon Nicholas (born 1999), in the Israeli Basketball Premier League
- Jacob Wiley (born 1994), in the Israeli Basketball Premier League

== Season-by-season records ==
Record table
| Season | Coach | Overall | Conference | Standing | Postseason |
|---|---|---|---|---|---|
No Coach Listed () (1901–1904)
| 1901–1902 | n/a | 0–1 | | | |
| 1902–1903 | n/a | 1–1 | | | |
| 1903–1904 | n/a | 1–0 | | | |
| n/a: | | 2–2 | | | |
No Team (1904–1905)
| 1904–1905 | n/a | x | | | |
Fred Schule (1905–1907)
| 1905–1906 | Fred Schule | 4–2 | | | |
| 1906–1907 | Fred Schule | 2–2 | | | |
| Fred Schule: | | 6–4 | | | |
Albion Findley (1907–1909)
| 1907–1908 | Albion Findley | 6–3 | | | |
| 1908–1909 | Albion Findley | unavailable | | | |
No Team (1909–1911)
| 1909–1910 | n/a | x | | | |
| 1910–1911 | n/a | x | | | |
Albert N. Whitlock (1911–1912)
| 1911–1912 | Albert N. Whitlock | 1–6 | | | |
W.W.H Mustaine (1912–1914)
| 1912–1913 | W.W.H Mustaine | 5–3 | | | |
| 1913–1914 | W.W.H Mustaine | 3–8 | | | |
| W.W.H Mustaine: | | 8–11 | | | |
Jerry Nissen (Northwest Conference) (1914–1918)
| 1914–1915 | Jerry Nissen | 4–6 | | | |
| 1915–1916 | Jerry Nissen | 7–3 | | | |
| 1916–1917 | Jerry Nissen | 4–11 | | | |
| 1917–1918 | Jerry Nissen | 6–6 | | | |
| Jerry Nissen: | | 21–26 | | | |
No Team (1918–1919)
| 1918–1919 | n/a | x | | | |
Bernie Bierman (1919–1922)
| 1919–1920 | Bernie Bierman | 6–9 | | | |
| 1920–1921 | Bernie Bierman | 12–8 | | | |
| 1921–1922 | Bernie Bierman | 14–7 | | | |
| Bernie Bierman: | | 32–24 | | | |
J.W. Stewart (Pacific Coast Conference) (1922–1932)
| 1922–1923 | J.W. Stewart | 7–14 | | | |
| 1923–1924 | J.W. Stewart | 7–8 | | | |
| 1924–1925 | J.W. Stewart | 9–10 | | | |
| 1925–1926 | J.W. Stewart | 5–10 | | | |
| 1926–1927 | J.W. Stewart | 5–11 | | | |
| 1927–1928 | J.W. Stewart | 6–8 | | | |
| 1928–1929 | J.W. Stewart | 9–11 | | | |
| 1929–1930 | J.W. Stewart | 13–9 | | | |
| 1930–1931 | J.W. Stewart | 10–12 | | | |
| 1931–1932 | J.W. Stewart | 6–14 | | | |
| J.W. Stewart: | | 77–107 | | | |
A.J. Lewandowski (Pacific Coast Conference) (1932–1937)
| 1932–1933 | A.J. Lewandowski | 8–11 | | | |
| 1933–1934 | A.J. Lewandowski | 16–9–1 | | | |
| 1934–1935 | A.J. Lewandowski | 6–18 | | | |
| 1935–1936 | A.J. Lewandowski | 13–11 | | | |
| 1936–1937 | A.J. Lewandowski | 14–12 | | | |
| A.J. Lewandowski: | | 57–61–1 | | | |
George Dahlberg (Pacific Coast Conference) (1937–1941)
| 1937–1938 | George Dahlberg | 9–18 | | | |
| 1938–1939 | George Dahlberg | 17–13 | | | |
| 1939–1940 | George Dahlberg | 17–8 | | | AAU National 3rd Round |
| 1940–1941 | George Dahlberg | 13–14 | | | |
| 1941–1942 | George Dahlberg | 14–10 | | | |
| George Dahlberg: | | 70–63 | | | |
Clyde Carpenter/Ed Chinske (Pacific Coast Conference) (1942–1943)
| 1942–1943 | Clyde Carpenter/Ed Chinske | 15–9 | | | |
Edward Buzzetti (Pacific Coast Conference) (1943–1944)
| 1943–1944 | Edward Buzzetti | 1–11 | | | |
George Dahlberg (Pacific Coast Conference/Skyline Conference) (1944–1955)
| 1944–1945 | George Dahlberg | 7–22 | | | |
| 1945–1946 | George Dahlberg | 12–16 | | | |
| 1946–1947 | George Dahlberg | 12–16 | | | |
| 1947–1948 | George Dahlberg | 21–11 | | | |
| 1948–1949 | George Dahlberg | 12–13 | | | |
| 1949–1950 | George Dahlberg | 27–4 | | | |
| 1950–1951 | George Dahlberg | 12–18 | | | |
| 1951–1952 | George Dahlberg | 12–14 | | | |
| 1952–1953 | George Dahlberg | 14–11 | | | |
| 1953–1954 | George Dahlberg | 8–19 | | | |
| 1954–1955 | George Dahlberg | 12–14 | | | |
| George Dahlberg: | | 165–170 | | | |
| George Dahlberg (1937–42)(1944–55): | | 235–233 | | | |
Forrest Cox (Skyline Conference) (1955–1962)
| 1955–1956 | Forrest Cox | 14–12 | | | |
| 1956–1957 | Forrest Cox | 13–9 | | | |
| 1957–1958 | Forrest Cox | 12–10 | | | |
| 1958–1959 | Forrest Cox | 10–14 | | | |
| 1959–1960 | Forrest Cox | 7–17 | | | |
| 1960–1961 | Forrest Cox | 14–9 | | | |
| 1961–1962 | Forrest Cox | 10–14 | | | |
| Forrest Cox: | | 80–73 | | | |
Ron Nord (Big Sky) (1962–1968)
| 1962–1963 | Ron Nord | 6–18 | | | |
| 1963–1964 | Ron Nord | 6–17 | 1–9 | 5th | |
| 1964–1965 | Ron Nord | 11–15 | 2–8 | 6th | |
| 1965–1966 | Ron Nord | 14–10 | 6–4 | 3rd | |
| 1966–1967 | Ron Nord | 6–18 | 1–9 | 6th | |
| 1967–1968 | Ron Nord | 8–17 | 5–10 | 6th | |
| Ron Nord: | | 51–95 | 15–40 | | |
Bob Cope (Big Sky) (1968–1970)
| 1968–1969 | Bob Cope | 9–17 | 4–11 | 5th | |
| 1969–1970 | Bob Cope | 8–18 | 5–10 | 5th | |
| Bob Cope: | | 17–35 | 9–21 | | |
Lou Rocheleau (Big Sky) (1970–1971)
| 1970–1971 | Lou Rocheleau | 9–15 | 6–8 | T-5th | |
Jud Heathcote (Big Sky) (1971–1976)
| 1971–1972 | Jud Heathcote | 14–12 | 7–7 | T-5th | |
| 1972–1973 | Jud Heathcote | 13–13 | 7–7 | 4th | |
| 1973–1974 | Jud Heathcote | 19–8 | 11–3 | T-1st | Big Sky playoff game |
| 1974–1975 | Jud Heathcote | 21–8 | 13–1 | 1st | NCAA Sweet 16 |
| 1975–1976 | Jud Heathcote | 13–12 | 7–7 | 5th | |
| Jud Heathcote: | | 80–53 | 45–36 | | |
Jim Brandenburg (Big Sky) (1976–1978)
| 1976–1977 | Jim Brandenburg | 6–20 | 6–8 | T-4th | |
| 1977–1978 | Jim Brandenburg | 20–9 | 12–2 | 1st | Big Sky Final |
| Jim Brandenburg: | | 26–29 | 18–10 | | |
Mike Montgomery (Big Sky) (1978–1986)
| 1978–1979 | Mike Montgomery | 14–13 | 7–7 | 4th | Big Sky Semifinal |
| 1979–1980 | Mike Montgomery | 17–11 | 8–6 | 3rd | Big Sky Final |
| 1980–1981 | Mike Montgomery | 19–9 | 11–3 | T-2nd | Big Sky Final |
| 1981–1982 | Mike Montgomery | 17–10 | 10–4 | 2nd | Big Sky Semifinal |
| 1982–1983 | Mike Montgomery | 22–7 | 9–5 | 3rd | Big Sky Semifinal |
| 1983–1984 | Mike Montgomery | 23–7 | 9–5 | 2nd | Big Sky Final |
| 1984–1985 | Mike Montgomery | 22–8 | 10–4 | 2nd | NIT 1st Round |
| 1985–1986 | Mike Montgomery | 21–11 | 9–5 | 2nd | NIT 1st Round |
| Mike Montgomery: | | 155–79 | 73–39 | | |
Stew Morrill (Big Sky) (1986–1990)
| 1986–1987 | Stew Morrill | 18–11 | 8–6 | 3rd | Big Sky Quarterfinal |
| 1987–1988 | Stew Morrill | 18–11 | 7–9 | 7th | Big Sky Semifinal |
| 1988–1989 | Stew Morrill | 20–11 | 11–5 | 3rd | Big Sky Semifinal |
| 1989–1990 | Stew Morrill | 19–10 | 10–6 | 3rd | Big Sky Semifinal |
| 1990–1991 | Stew Morrill | 22–9 | 13–3 | 1st | NCAA 1st Round |
| Stew Morrill: | | 97–59 | 49–29 | | |
Blaine Taylor (Big Sky) (1991–1998)
| 1991–1992 | Blaine Taylor | 26–5 | 14–2 | 1st | NCAA 1st Round |
| 1992–1993 | Blaine Taylor | 17–11 | 8–6 | 4th | Big Sky Quarterfinal |
| 1993–1994 | Blaine Taylor | 19–9 | 7–7 | 6th | Big Sky Quarterfinal |
| 1994–1995 | Blaine Taylor | 21–9 | 11–3 | T-1st | NIT 1st Round |
| 1995–1996 | Blaine Taylor | 20–8 | 10–4 | T-2nd | Big Sky Quarterfinal |
| 1996–1997 | Blaine Taylor | 21–11 | 11–5 | 2nd | NCAA 1st Round |
| 1997–1998 | Blaine Taylor | 16–14 | 9–7 | T-5th | Big Sky Quarterfinal |
| Blaine Taylor: | | 140–67 | 61–34 | | |
Don Holst (Big Sky) (1998–2002)
| 1998–1999 | Don Holst | 13–14 | | | |
| 1999–2000 | Don Holst | 17–11 | 6–10 | 7th | Big Sky Quarterfinal |
| 2000–2001 | Don Holst | 11–16 | 6–10 | T-7th | |
| 2001–2002 | Don Holst | 16–15 | 7–7 | T-4th | NCAA 1st Round |
| Don Holst: | | 57–56 | 31–31 | | |
Pat Kennedy (Big Sky) (2002–2004)
| 2002–2003 | Pat Kennedy | 13–17 | 7–7 | T-3rd | Big Sky Quarterfinal |
| 2003–2004 | Pat Kennedy | 10–18 | 6–8 | T-6th | Big Sky Quarterfinal |
| Pat Kennedy: | | 23–35 | 13–15 | | |
Larry Krystkowiak (Big Sky) (2004–2006)
| 2004–2005 | Larry Krystkowiak | 18–13 | 9–5 | T-2nd | NCAA 1st Round |
| 2005–2006 | Larry Krystkowiak | 24–7 | 10–4 | 2nd | NCAA 2nd Round |
| Larry Kryskowiak: | | 42–20 | 19–9 | | |
Wayne Tinkle (Big Sky) (2006–2014)
| 2006–2007 | Wayne Tinkle | 17–15 | 10–6 | 3rd | Big Sky Semifinal |
| 2007–2008 | Wayne Tinkle | 14–16 | 8–8 | T-4th | Big Sky Quarterfinal |
| 2008–2009 | Wayne Tinkle | 17–12 | 11–5 | T-2nd | Big Sky Quarterfinal |
| 2009–2010 | Wayne Tinkle | 22–10 | 10–6 | T-3rd | NCAA 1st Round |
| 2010–2011 | Wayne Tinkle | 21–11 | 12–4 | 2nd | CBI 1st Round |
| 2011–2012 | Wayne Tinkle | 25–6 | 15–1 | 1st | NCAA 1st Round |
| 2012–2013 | Wayne Tinkle | 25–7 | 19–1 | 1st | NCAA 1st Round |
| 2013–2014 | Wayne Tinkle | 17–13 | 12–8 | 2nd | |
| Wayne Tinkle: | | 158–90 | 97–39 | | |
Travis DeCuire (Big Sky) (2014–present)
| 2014–2015 | Travis DeCuire | 20–13 | 14–4 | T–1st | NIT first round |
| 2015–2016 | Travis DeCuire | 21–12 | 14–4 | 2nd | CBI first round |
| 2016–2017 | Travis DeCuire | 16–16 | 11–7 | T–5th | |
| 2017–2018 | Travis DeCuire | 26–8 | 16–2 | 1st | NCAA 1st Round |
| 2018–2019 | Travis DeCuire | 26–9 | 16–4 | 1st | NCAA 1st Round |
| 2019–2020 | Travis DeCuire | 18-13 | 14-6 | 3rd | Tournament canceled due to COVID-19 |
| 2020–2021 | Travis DeCuire | 15-13 | 7-9 | 6th | |
| 2021–2022 | Travis DeCuire | 18-14 | 11-9 | T-5th | |
| 2022-2023 | Travis DeCuire | 17-14 | 10-7 | 4th | |
| 2023-2024 | Travis DeCuire | 24-12 | 12-6 | T-2nd | |
| 2024-2025 | Travis DeCuire | 25-10 | 15-3 | T-1st | NCAA 1st Round |
| Travis DeCuire: | | 223-134 | 140-62 | | |
| Total: | | 1,606-1,310 | | | |
National champion Postseason invitational champion Conference regular season champion Conference regular season and conference tournament champion Division regular season champion Division regular season and conference tournament champion Conference tournament champion
