= Portland State Vikings men's basketball =

American college men's basketball team

2026–27 Portland State Vikings men's basketball team
- University: Portland State University
- Head coach: Jase Coburn (6th season)
- Location: Portland, Oregon
- Arena: Viking Pavilion (capacity: 3,094)
- Conference: Big Sky
- Nickname: Vikings
- Colors: Green, white, and silver

NCAA Division I tournament appearances
- 1967*, 2008, 2009

Conference tournament champions
- 2008, 2009

Conference regular-season champions
- 2005, 2008, 2026

Uniforms
Home	Away
- *at Division II level

The Portland State Vikings men's basketball team represents Portland State University in Portland, Oregon. The team was also once referred to as "The Park Block Bombers" in reference to the school's proximity to Portland's string of park blocks. The school's team competes in the Big Sky Conference. The Vikings have appeared in the NCAA Division I men's basketball tournament two times, most recently in 2009. The head coach of the Vikings is Jase Coburn.

== Conference affiliations ==
- 1946–47 to 1948–49 – NAIA Independent
- 1949–50 to 1964–65 – Oregon Collegiate Conference
- 1965–66 to 1980–81 – NCAA Division II Independent
- 1981–82 to 1995–96 – no team
- 1996–97 to present – Big Sky Conference

== Postseason results ==
=== NCAA Division I ===
The Vikings have appeared in two NCAA tournaments, with a combined record of 0–2.

Year	Seed	Round	Opponent	Result
2008	16 M	Round of 64	(1) #4 Kansas	L 61–85
2009	13 E	Round of 64	(4) #20 Xavier	L 59–77

=== NCAA Division II ===
The Vikings appeared in the NCAA Men's Division II men's basketball tournament once, with a combined record of 0–2.

Year	Round	Opponent	Result
1967	First Round; Regional Third Place	San Diego State; UC Davis	L 73–101; L 61–81

=== CIT results ===
The Vikings have appeared in the CollegeInsider.com Postseason Tournament (CIT) two times, with a combined record of 0–2.

Year	Round	Opponent	Result
2014	Round of 32	San Diego	L 65–87
2018	Round of 16	San Diego	L 64–67

=== NAIA tournament results ===
The Vikings appeared in the NAIA Tournament two times, with a combined record of 0–2.

Year	Round	Opponent	Result
1955	First Round	East Texas State	L 55–68
1956	First Round	Wisconsin–Eau Claire	L 76–84

== Vikings in the NBA ==
- Ime Udoka, current coach. Houston Rockets
- Freeman Williams, former NBA guard
- Dan Burke, current coach. Philadelphia 76ers

== Portland State men's basketball players in professional teams ==
Player	Year	Current team	League
Brandon Hollins	2018	Aragats BT	Armenia Basketball League A
Bryce Canda	2018	Kingspan Královští Sokoli	National Basketball League (Czech Republic)
DeSean Parsons	2017	Uralmash Yekaterinburg	Russian Basketball Super League 1
Ryan Edwards	2018	CB Valls	Liga EBA
Dominic Waters	2010	Ironi Nahariya	Israel Basketball Premier League
Scott Morrison	2008	Ryukyu Golden Kings	B.League
