= 1992–93 Idaho Vandals men's basketball team =

American college basketball season

1992–93 Idaho Vandals men's basketball

Big Sky champions
- Conference: Big Sky Conference
- Record: 24–8 (11–3 Big Sky)
- Head coach: Larry Eustachy (3rd season)
- Assistant coaches: Hugh Watson; Steve Barnes (5th season)
- MVP: Orlando Lightfoot
- Home arena: Kibbie Dome

1992–93 Big Sky men's basketball standings
	Conf.				Overall
Team	W		L	PCT	W		L	PCT
Idaho	11	–	3	.786	24	–	8	.750
Boise State †	10	–	4	.714	21	–	8	.724
Weber State	10	–	4	.714	20	–	8	.714
Montana	8	–	6	.571	17	–	11	.607
Idaho State	5	–	9	.357	10	–	18	.357
Montana State	5	–	9	.357	9	–	18	.333
Northern Arizona	4	–	10	.286	10	–	16	.385
Eastern Washington	3	–	11	.214	6	–	20	.231
† Conference tournament winner

The 1992–93 Idaho Vandals men's basketball team represented the University of Idaho during the 1992–93 NCAA Division I men's basketball season. Members of the Big Sky Conference, the Vandals were led by third-year head coach Larry Eustachy and played their home games on campus at the Kibbie Dome in Moscow, Idaho.

The Vandals were 23–7 overall in the regular season and 11–3 in conference play, atop the league standings. The conference tournament was held in Moscow for the first time in eleven years, but the Vandals lost by twelve points to Boise State in the final. Idaho had swept the season series, including a fifteen-point win in Boise the previous week before a conference record crowd of 12,649.

At 24–8, Idaho was not selected by the National Invitational tournament, and their season ended. Eustachy left in mid-March for Utah State, and was succeeded by Utah assistant Joe Cravens in early April.

Junior forward Orlando Lightfoot was named the most valuable player in the Big Sky Conference; he averaged 22.3 points and 8.6 rebounds per game.

== Postseason results ==
Date time, TV	Rank^{#}	Opponent^{#}	Result	Record	Site (attendance) city, state
Big Sky tournament
Fri, March 12; 9:05 pm	(1)	(5) Idaho State; Semifinal	W 91–87	24–7	Kibbie Dome (4,800); Moscow, Idaho
Sat, March 13; 9:07 pm, ESPN	(1)	(2) Boise State; Final	L 68–80	24–8	Kibbie Dome (4,800); Moscow, Idaho
*Non-conference game. (#) Tournament seedings in parentheses. All times are in Pacific time.
