= Big Sky Conference Men's Basketball Player of the Year =

Annual basketball award

- Awarded for: the most outstanding basketball player in the Big Sky Conference
- Country: United States

History
- First award: 1979
- Most recent: Terri Miller Jr., Portland State

The Big Sky Conference Men's Basketball Player of the Year Award, officially known as the Big Sky Conference Men's Basketball Most Valuable Player Award, is an annual award given to the Big Sky Conference's most outstanding player. The award was first given following the 1978–79 season. Only one player, Larry Krystkowiak of Montana, has won the award three times (1984–1986). Three others have been two-time winners: Orlando Lightfoot of Idaho (1993, 1994), and Weber State's Harold Arceneaux (1999, 2000) and Damian Lillard (2010, 2012). Weber State has the most all-time awards (12) and individual winners (10). Montana and Eastern Washington are tied for second in total awards with seven apiece.

== Key ==
†	Co-Players of the Year
*	Awarded a national player of the year award that same season: Helms Foundation College Basketball Player of the Year (1904–05 to 1978–79); UPI College Basketball Player of the Year (1954–55 to 1995–96); Oscar Robertson Trophy (1958–59 to present); Naismith College Player of the Year (1968–69 to present); John R. Wooden Award (1976–77 to present)
Player (X)	Denotes the number of times the player has been awarded the Big Sky Player of the Year award at that point

== Winners ==
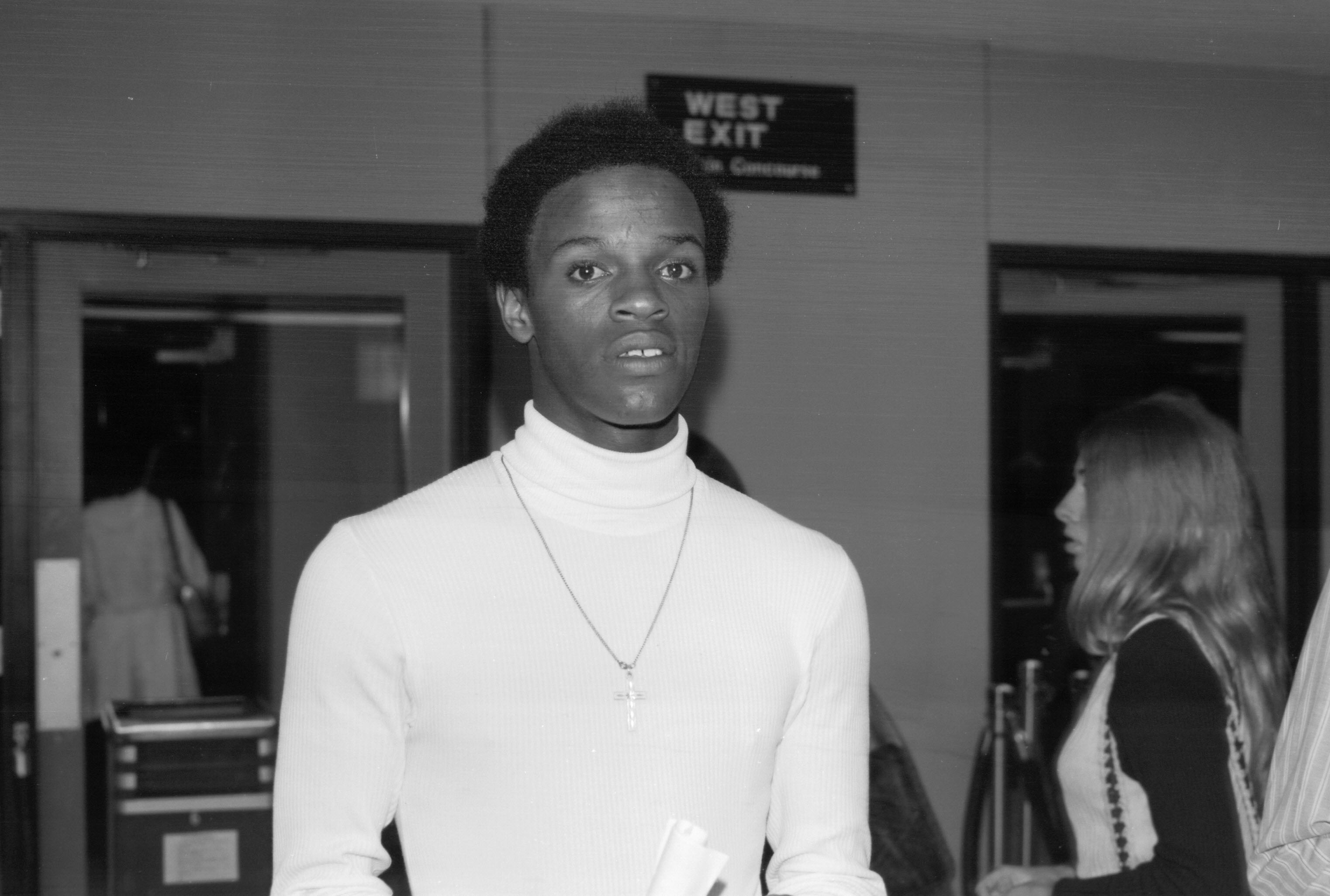
Lawrence Butler, Idaho State, 1979

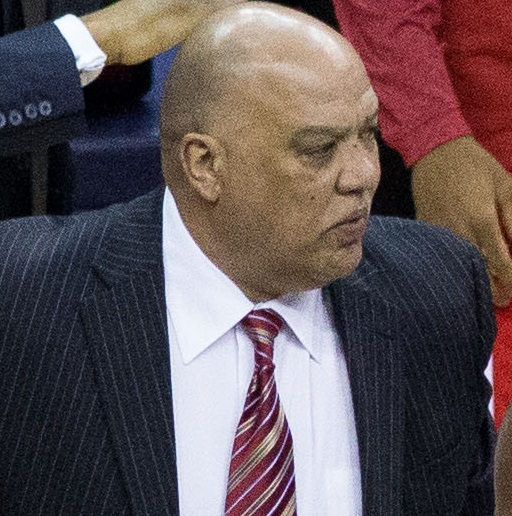
Don Newman, Idaho, 1981

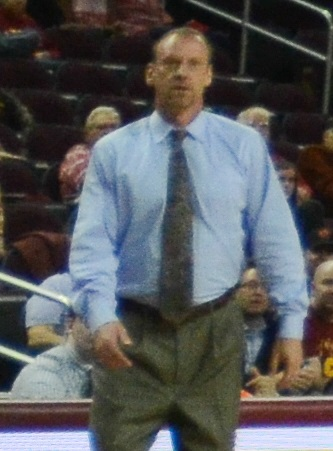
Larry Krystkowiak, Montana, 1984 through 1986

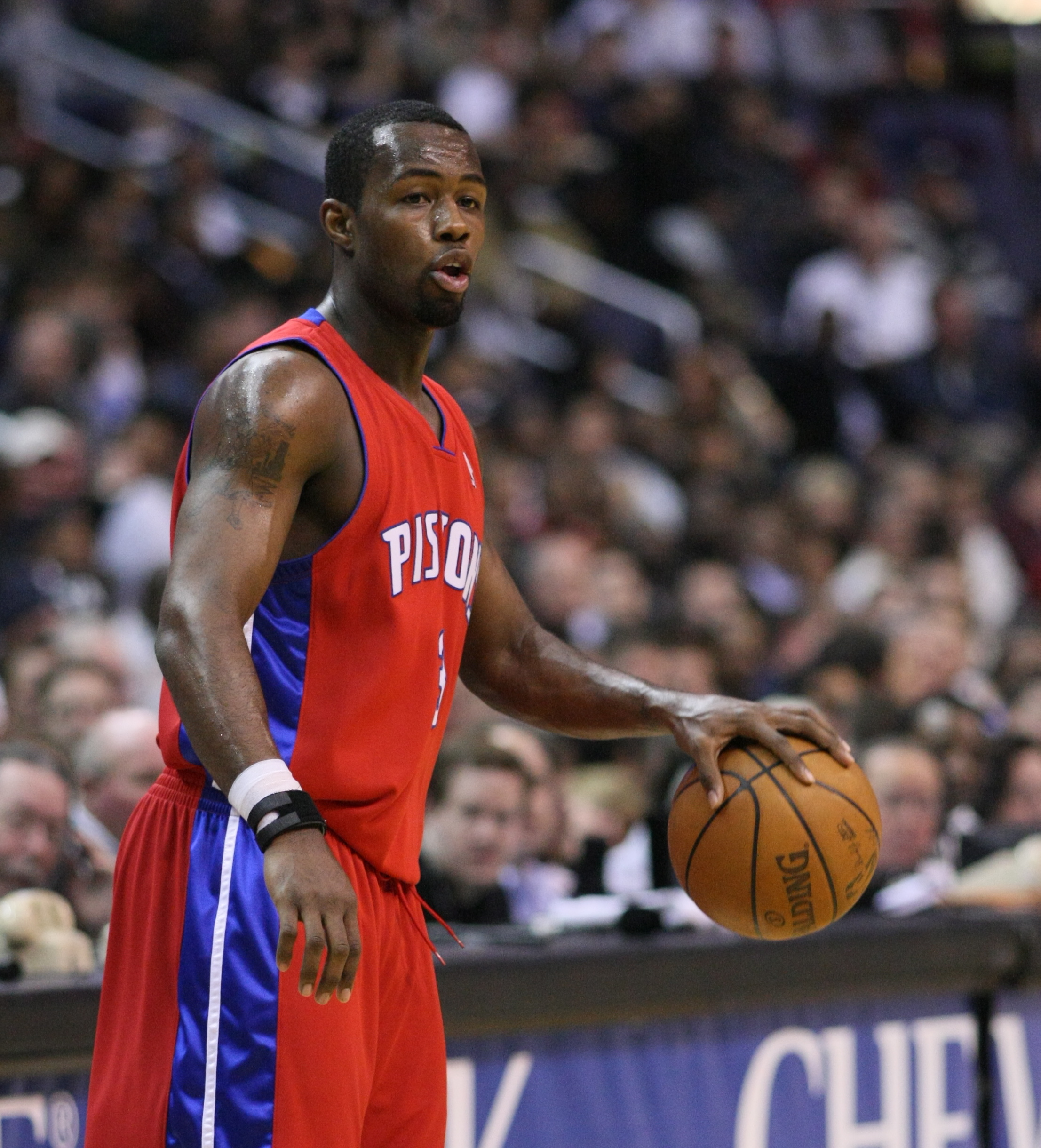
Rodney Stuckey, Eastern Washington, 2006

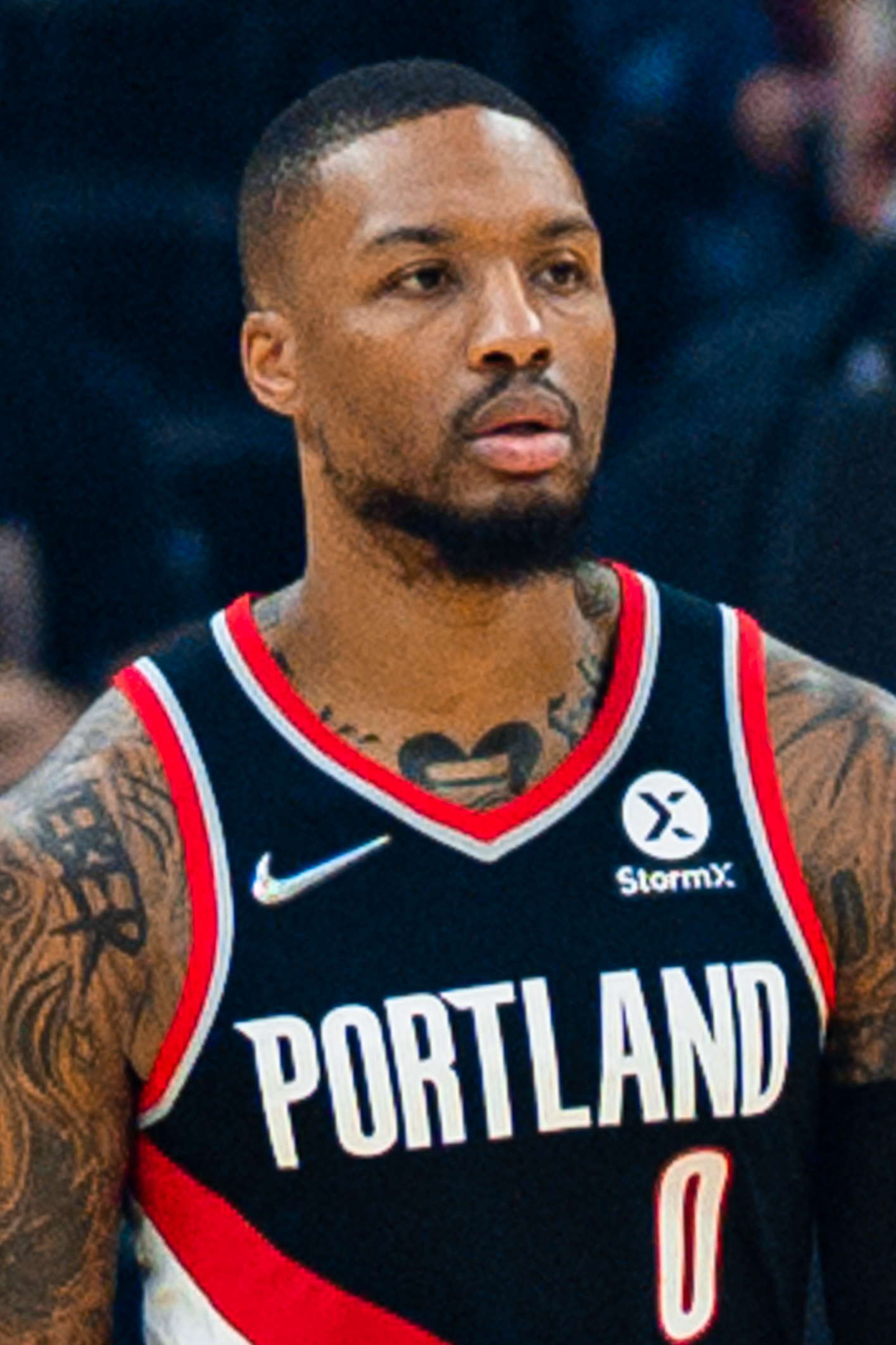
Damian Lillard, Weber State, 2010 and 2012

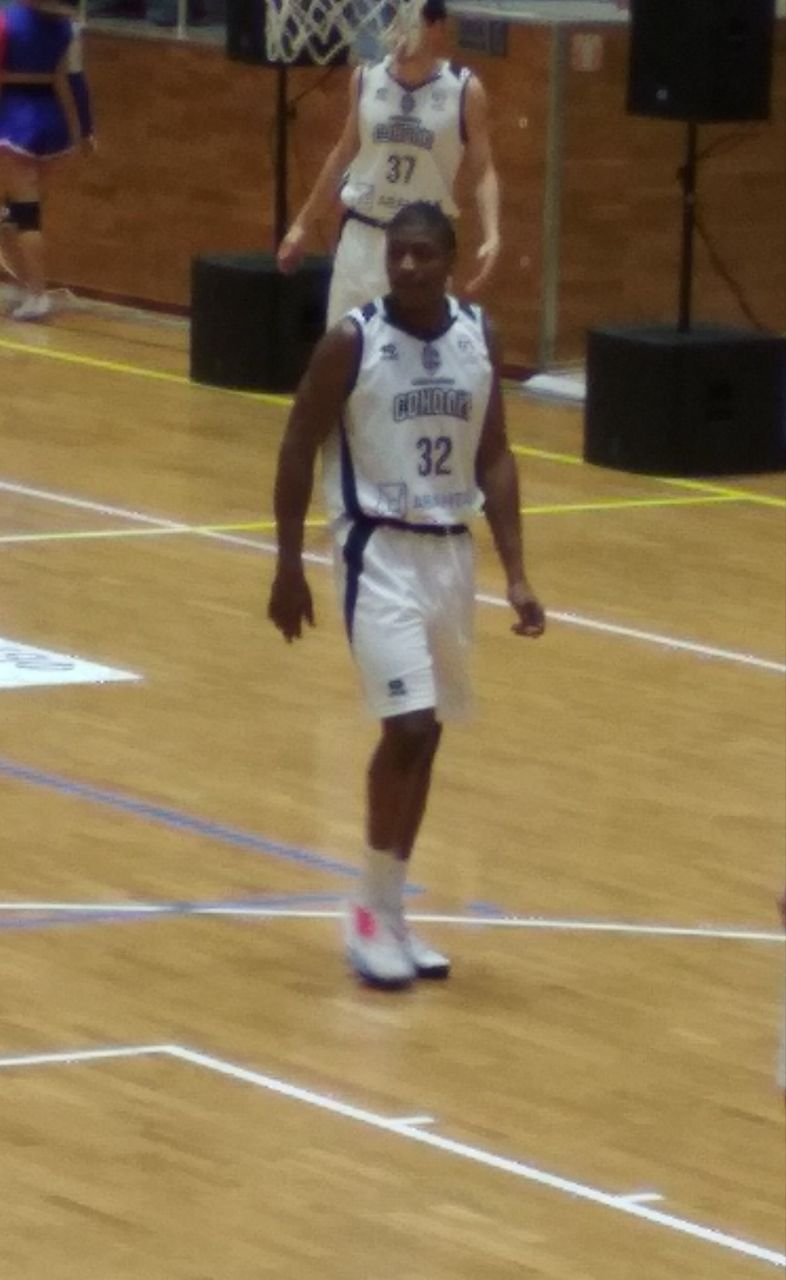
Kareem Jamar, Montana, 2013

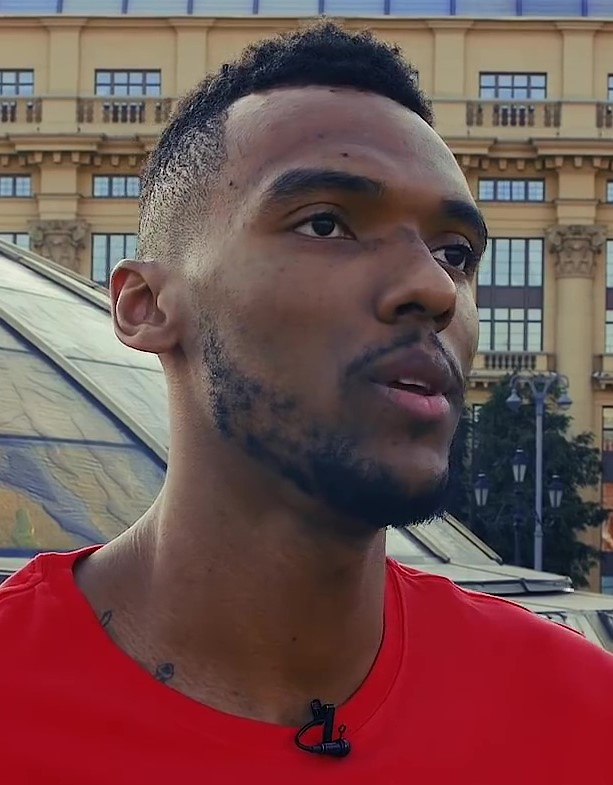
Joel Bolomboy, Weber State, 2016

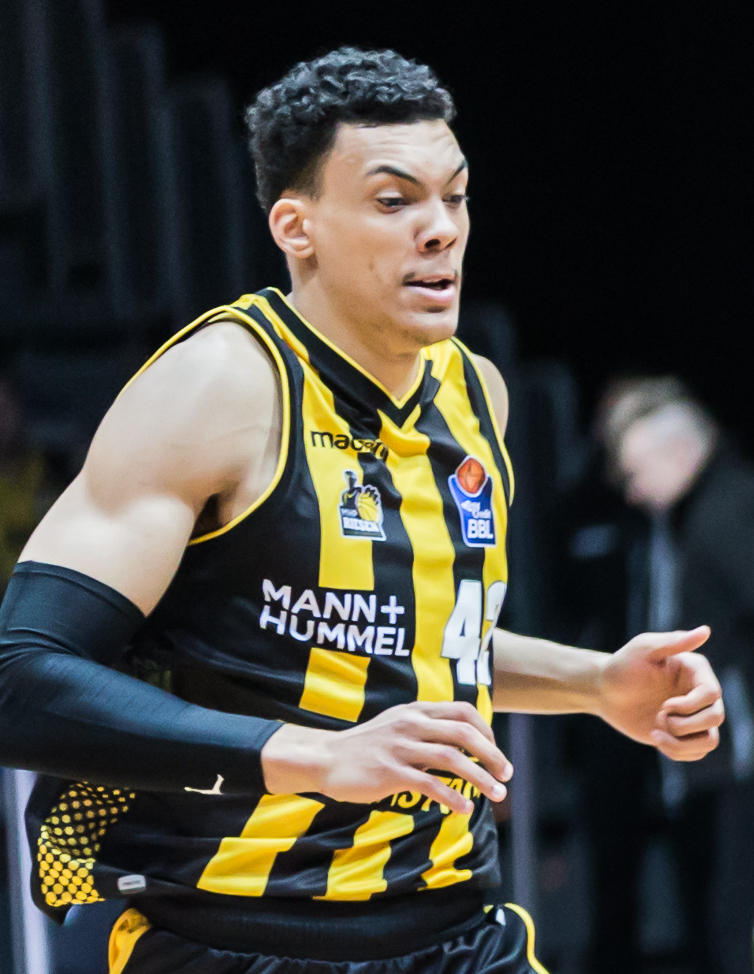
Jacob Wiley, Eastern Washington, 2017

Season	Player	School	Position	Class	Reference
1978–79	Lawrence Butler	Idaho State	SG	Senior	
1979–80	Don Newman	Idaho	G	Senior	
1980–81	Brian Kellerman	Idaho	SG	Sophomore	
1981–82	Ken Owens	Idaho	PG	Senior	
1982–83	Derrick Pope	Montana	PF	Senior	
1983–84	Larry Krystkowiak	Montana	C	Sophomore	
1984–85	Larry Krystkowiak (2)	Montana	C	Junior	
1985–86	Larry Krystkowiak (3)	Montana	C	Senior	
1986–87	Tom Domako	Montana State	SF	Junior	
1987–88	Arnell Jones	Boise State	PF	Senior	
1988–89	Chris Childs	Boise State	PG	Senior	
1989–90	Riley Smith	Idaho	C	Senior	
1990–91	Kevin Kearney	Montana	SF	Senior	
1991–92^{†}	Delvon Anderson	Montana	G	Senior	
1991–92^{†}	Kevin Soares	Nevada	PG	Senior	
1992–93	Orlando Lightfoot	Idaho	SG	Junior	
1993–94	Orlando Lightfoot (2)	Idaho	SG	Senior	
1994–95	Ruben Nembhard	Weber State	SG	Senior	
1995–96^{†}	Jimmy DeGraffenried	Weber State	SG	Senior	
1995–96^{†}	Quadre Lollis	Montana State	F	Senior	
1996–97	Charles Thomas	Northern Arizona	PG	Senior	
1997–98	Andrew Mavis	Northern Arizona	PF	Senior	
1998–99	Harold Arceneaux	Weber State	SF	Junior	
1999–00	Harold Arceneaux (2)	Weber State	SF	Senior	
2000–01	Brian Heinle	Cal State Northridge	C	Senior	
2001–02	Jason Erickson	Montana State	SG	Sophomore	
2002–03	Jermaine Boyette	Weber State	G	Senior	
2003–04	Alvin Snow	Eastern Washington	PG / SG	Senior	
2004–05	Seamus Boxley	Portland State	SF	Senior	
2005–06	Rodney Stuckey	Eastern Washington	PG	Freshman	
2006–07	David Patten	Weber State	PF	Senior	
2007–08	Jeremiah Dominguez	Portland State	PG	Junior	
2008–09	Kellen McCoy	Weber State	PG	Senior	
2009–10	Damian Lillard	Weber State	PG / SG	Sophomore	
2010–11	Devon Beitzel	Northern Colorado	SG	Senior	
2011–12	Damian Lillard (2)	Weber State	PG / SG	Junior	
2012–13	Kareem Jamar	Montana	SG / SF	Junior	
2013–14	Davion Berry	Weber State	SF	Senior	
2014–15	Mikh McKinney	Sacramento State	PG	Senior	
2015–16	Joel Bolomboy	Weber State	PF / C	Senior	
2016–17	Jacob Wiley	Eastern Washington	PF	Senior	
2017–18	Bogdan Bliznyuk	Eastern Washington	SG / SF	Senior	
2018–19	Jordan Davis	Northern Colorado	SG	Senior	
2019–20	Mason Peatling	Eastern Washington	PF	Senior	
2020–21	Tanner Groves	Eastern Washington	PF	Junior	
2021–22	Jubrile Belo	Montana State	PF	Senior	
2022–23	Steele Venters	Eastern Washington	SG	Junior	
2023–24	Dillon Jones	Weber State	SG / SF	Senior	
2024–25	Dylan Darling	Idaho State	PG	Sophomore	
2025–26	Terri Miller Jr.	Portland State	PF	Senior	

== Winners by school ==
School (year joined)	Winners	Years
Weber State (1963)	12	1995, 1996^{†}, 1999, 2000, 2003, 2007, 2009, 2010, 2012, 2014, 2016, 2024
Eastern Washington (1987)	7	2004, 2006, 2017, 2018, 2020, 2021, 2023
Montana (1963)	7	1983, 1984, 1985, 1986, 1991, 1992^{†}, 2013
Idaho (1963, 2014) (Note: The University of Idaho left in 1996 to join the Big West Conference, and rejoined the Big Sky for non-football sports in 2014 (and football in 2018).)	6	1980, 1981, 1982, 1990, 1993, 1994
Montana State (1963)	4	1987, 1996^{†}, 2002, 2022
Portland State (1996)	3	2005, 2008, 2026
Boise State (1970) (Note: Boise State University left in 1996 to join the Big West. The Broncos joined the Pac-12 Conference in 2026 after several years in the Mountain West Conference (MW).)	2	1988, 1989
Idaho State (1963)	2	1979, 2025
Northern Arizona (1970)	2	1997, 1998
Northern Colorado (2006)	2	2011, 2019
Cal State Northridge (1996) (Note: California State University, Northridge left in 2001 to join the Big West.)	1	2001
Nevada (1979) (Note: The University of Nevada, Reno left in 1992 to join the Big West. The Wolf Pack are now in the MW.)	1	1992^{†}
Sacramento State (1996) (Note: California State University, Sacramento left in 2026 for the Big West.)	1	2015
North Dakota (2012) (Note: The University of North Dakota left in 2018 to join the Summit League.)	0	—
Southern Utah (2012, 2026) (Note: Southern Utah University left in 2022 for the Western Athletic Conference and rejoined the Big Sky in 2026.)	0	—
Utah Tech (2026)	0	—
