= 1989–90 Idaho Vandals men's basketball team =

American college basketball season

1989–90 Idaho Vandals men's basketball

Big Sky champions

NCAA tournament, First round
- Conference: Big Sky Conference
- Record: 25–6 (13–3 Big Sky)
- Head coach: Kermit Davis (2nd season)
- Assistant coaches: Steve Barnes (2nd season); James Green (2nd season)
- Home arena: Kibbie Dome

1989–90 Big Sky men's basketball standings
	Conf.				Overall
Team	W		L	PCT	W		L	PCT
Idaho †	13	–	3	.813	25	–	6	.806
Eastern Washington	11	–	5	.688	18	–	11	.621
Montana	10	–	6	.625	18	–	11	.621
Nevada	9	–	7	.563	15	–	13	.536
Weber State	8	–	8	.500	14	–	15	.483
Montana State	8	–	8	.500	17	–	12	.586
Boise State	7	–	9	.438	12	–	15	.444
Northern Arizona	3	–	13	.188	8	–	20	.286
Idaho State	3	–	13	.188	6	–	21	.222
† Conference tournament winner

The 1989–90 Idaho Vandals men's basketball team represented the University of Idaho during the 1989–90 NCAA Division I men's basketball season. Members of the Big Sky Conference, the Vandals were led by second-year head coach Kermit Davis and played their home games on campus at the Kibbie Dome in Moscow, Idaho.

The Vandals were 23–5 overall in the regular season and 13–3 in conference play, champions in the regular season standings. At the conference tournament in Boise, the Vandals earned a third consecutive bye into the semifinals, where they beat sixth seed Montana State by nine points. In the final against league runner-up Eastern Washington, Idaho's Ricardo Boyd sank a three-pointer as time expired to break a tie and give the Vandals a second consecutive NCAA berth.

Seeded thirteenth again in the West Regional, Idaho lost to Louisville by nineteen points in Salt Lake City in the first round. Davis left in late March for Texas A&M, and was succeeded by Larry Eustachy, a former fellow UI assistant in Tim Floyd's first season (1986–87).

This was Idaho's fourth appearance in the NCAA tournament in ten years, but remains its most recent.

== Postseason results ==
Date time, TV	Rank^{#}	Opponent^{#}	Result	Record	Site (attendance) city, state
Big Sky tournament
Fri, March 9; 5:30 pm	(1)	vs. (6) Montana State; Semifinal	W 80–71	24–5	BSU Pavilion (6,328); Boise, Idaho
Sat, March 10; 7:00 pm, ESPN	(1)	vs. (2) Eastern Washington; Final	W 65–62	25–5	BSU Pavilion (6,541); Boise, Idaho
NCAA tournament
Thu, March 15; 1:37 pm, ESPN	(13W)	vs. (4W) No. 16 Louisville; First round	L 59–78	25–6	Huntsman Center (10,298); Salt Lake City, Utah
*Non-conference game. ^{#}Rankings from AP poll. (#) Tournament seedings in parentheses. All times are in Pacific time.
