= 1988–89 Idaho Vandals men's basketball team =

American college basketball season

1988–89 Idaho Vandals men's basketball

Big Sky champions

NCAA tournament, First round
- Conference: Big Sky Conference
- Record: 25–6 (13–3 Big Sky)
- Head coach: Kermit Davis (1st season)
- Assistant coaches: Steve Barnes (1st season); James Green (1st season)
- Home arena: Kibbie Dome

1988–89 Big Sky men's basketball standings
	Conf.				Overall
Team	W		L	PCT	W		L	PCT
Boise State	13	–	3	.813	23	–	7	.767
Idaho †	13	–	3	.813	25	–	6	.806
Montana	11	–	5	.688	20	–	11	.645
Nevada	10	–	6	.625	16	–	12	.571
Weber State	9	–	7	.563	17	–	11	.607
Montana State	6	–	10	.375	15	–	16	.484
Eastern Washington	5	–	11	.313	8	–	22	.267
Idaho State	4	–	12	.250	9	–	18	.333
Northern Arizona	1	–	15	.063	2	–	25	.074
† Conference tournament winner

The 1988–89 Idaho Vandals men's basketball team represented the University of Idaho during the 1988–89 NCAA Division I men's basketball season. Members of the Big Sky Conference, the Vandals were led by first-year head coach Kermit Davis and played their home games on campus at the Kibbie Dome in Moscow, Idaho.

The Vandals were 23–5 overall in the regular season and 13–3 in conference play, co-champions in the standings with Boise State; the teams split their late-season series. At the conference tournament in Boise, the Vandals again earned a bye into the semifinals, where they beat Montana by 21 points. In the final against Boise State, Idaho defeated the host team by seven to earn its first NCAA berth in seven years.

Seeded thirteenth in the West region, Idaho met fourth-seed #15 UNLV back in Boise and lost by twelve.

== Postseason result ==
Date time, TV	Rank^{#}	Opponent^{#}	Result	Record	Site (attendance) city, state
Big Sky tournament
Fri, March 10; 6:07 pm	(2)	vs. (3) Montana; Semifinal	W 77–56	24–5	BSU Pavilion (8,500); Boise, Idaho
Sat, March 11; 8:07 pm, ESPN	(2)	at (1) Boise State; Final	W 59–52	25–5	BSU Pavilion (11,576); Boise, Idaho
NCAA tournament
Thu, March 16; 6:07 pm, CBS	(13W)	vs. (4W) No. 15 UNLV; First round	L 56–68	25–6	BSU Pavilion (12,241); Boise, Idaho
*Non-conference game. ^{#}Rankings from AP poll. (#) Tournament seedings in parentheses. All times are in Pacific time.
