= 1994 Big Sky Conference men's basketball tournament =

- Classification: Division I
- Season: 1993–94
- Teams: 6
- Site: BSU Pavilion; Boise, Idaho
- Champions: Boise State (4th title)
- Winning coach: Bobby Dye (3rd title)
- MVP: Shambric Williams (Boise State)

1993–94 Big Sky men's basketball standings
	Conf.				Overall
Team	W		L	PCT	W		L	PCT
Weber State	10	–	4	.714	20	–	10	.667
Idaho State	10	–	4	.714	18	–	9	.667
Idaho	9	–	5	.643	18	–	10	.643
Montana State	8	–	6	.571	16	–	11	.593
Boise State †	7	–	7	.500	17	–	13	.567
Montana	6	–	8	.429	19	–	9	.679
Northern Arizona	6	–	8	.429	13	–	13	.500
Eastern Washington	0	–	14	.000	5	–	21	.192
† Conference tournament winner

The 1994 Big Sky Conference men's basketball tournament was the nineteenth edition, held March 10–12 at the BSU Pavilion at Boise State University in Boise, Idaho.

Fifth-seeded host Boise State upset second-seeded Idaho State in the championship game, 85–81, to repeat as tournament champions and gain their fourth tournament title overall. The Broncos had defeated regular season champion Weber State in the semifinals.

== Format ==
Conference membership remained at eight and the tournament format was unchanged, with an exception; the site was predetermined, rather than awarded to the regular season champion.

The top six teams from the regular season participated, and the top two earned byes into the semifinals. The remaining four played in the quarterfinals, and the top seed met the lowest remaining seed in the semifinals.

== Bracket ==
Quarterfinals; Thursday, March 10
4	Montana State	57
5	Boise State	75
3	Idaho	74
6	Montana	63

Semifinals; Friday, March 11
1	Weber State	72
5	Boise State	84
2	Idaho State	73
3	Idaho	66

Championship; Saturday, March 12
5	Boise State	85
2	Idaho State	81

== NCAA tournament ==
The Broncos (17–12) received an automatic bid to the NCAA tournament; no other Big Sky members were invited to the tournament or the NIT. Boise State was seeded fourteenth in the West regional and lost by nine points to Louisville in the first round in Sacramento. It was the twelfth consecutive year that the Big Sky representative lost in the first round.

== See also ==
- Big Sky Conference women's basketball tournament
