= 1989–90 Boise State Broncos men's basketball team =

American college basketball season

1989–90 Boise State Broncos men's basketball
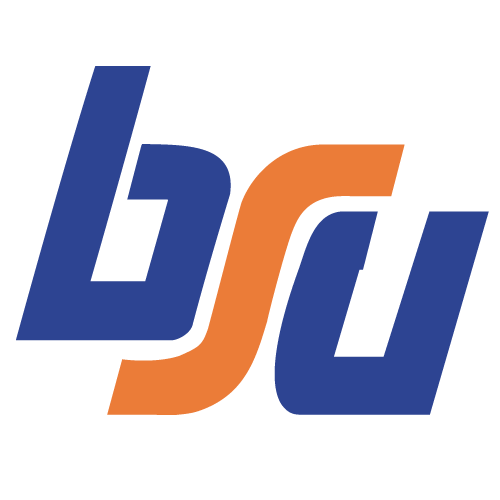
- Conference: Big Sky Conference
- Record: 12–15 (7–9 Big Sky)
- Head coach: Bobby Dye (7th season)
- Assistant coach: Rod Jensen
- Home arena: BSU Pavilion

1989–90 Big Sky men's basketball standings
| | Conf. | | | | Overall |
| Team | W | | L | PCT | W | | L | PCT |
|---|---|---|---|---|---|---|---|---|
| Idaho † | 13 | – | 3 | .813 | 25 | – | 6 | .806 |
| Eastern Washington | 11 | – | 5 | .688 | 18 | – | 11 | .621 |
| Montana | 10 | – | 6 | .625 | 18 | – | 11 | .621 |
| Nevada | 9 | – | 7 | .563 | 15 | – | 13 | .536 |
| Weber State | 8 | – | 8 | .500 | 14 | – | 15 | .483 |
| Montana State | 8 | – | 8 | .500 | 17 | – | 12 | .586 |
| Boise State | 7 | – | 9 | .438 | 12 | – | 15 | .444 |
| Northern Arizona | 3 | – | 13 | .188 | 8 | – | 20 | .286 |
| Idaho State | 3 | – | 13 | .188 | 6 | – | 21 | .222 |
† Conference tournament winner

The 1989–90 Boise State Broncos men's basketball team represented Boise State University during the 1989–90 NCAA Division I men's basketball season. The Broncos were led by seventh-year head coach Bobby Dye and played their home games on campus at the BSU Pavilion in Boise, Idaho.

They finished the regular season at 12–15 overall, with a 7–9 record in the Big Sky Conference, seventh in the standings.

The conference tournament was at home in Boise, but the Broncos did not qualify for the six-team field. It remains the only time in the tourney's history that the host did not play; it moved to neutral sites beginning in 2016.
