= Terri Miller Jr. =

American basketball player (born 2003)

No. 23 – Mexico City Capitanes
- Position: Power forward
- League: NBA G League

Personal information
- Born: April 3, 2003 (age 23)
- Listed height: 6 ft 8 in (2.03 m)
- Listed weight: 250 lb (113 kg)

Career information
- High school: Clovis North (Fresno, California)
- College: College of the Sequoias (2021–2023); Louisiana Tech (2023–2024); Portland State (2024–2026)
- NBA draft: 2026: undrafted
- Playing career: 2026–present

Career history
- 2026–present: Mexico City Capitanes

Career highlights
- Big Sky Player of the Year (2026); First-team All-Big Sky (2026); Second-team All-Big Sky (2025)

Terri Miller Jr. (born April 3, 2003) is an American basketball player for the Mexico City Capitanes of the NBA G League. He played college basketball for the College of the Sequoias Giants, Louisiana Tech Bulldogs and Portland State Vikings.

== College career ==
A power forward from Fresno, California, Miller attended Clovis North High School and began his college career at the College of the Sequoias. There he teamed with guard Javohn Garcia to lead the Giants to a 27–4 record during the 2022–23 season while averaging a balanced 13.9 points, 9.3 rebounds and 4.7 assists per game.

Miller's strong play landed him an offer from Division I Louisiana Tech. His play was limited by a foot injury and illness, but he averaged 3.2 points and 2 rebounds in 17 games.

Miller and teammate Jaylin Henderson transferred together from Louisiana Tech to Portland State to play for coach Jase Coburn. Alongside Canadian center Tre-Vaughn Minott, the trio led Portland State to a 19-win season in 2024–25, with Miller averaging 12.1 points and 5.5 rebounds and earning second-team All-Big Sky Conference honors. Miller followed this in his senior season by averaging 19.1 points, 5.6 rebounds and 3.4 assists and leading PSU to the Big Sky regular season title. At the close of the season, Miller was named the Big Sky MVP.

== Professional career ==
For the 2026–27 season, Miller signed with the Mexico City Capitanes of the NBA G League.
