= 1988–89 Boise State Broncos men's basketball team =

American college basketball season

1988–89 Boise State Broncos men's basketball
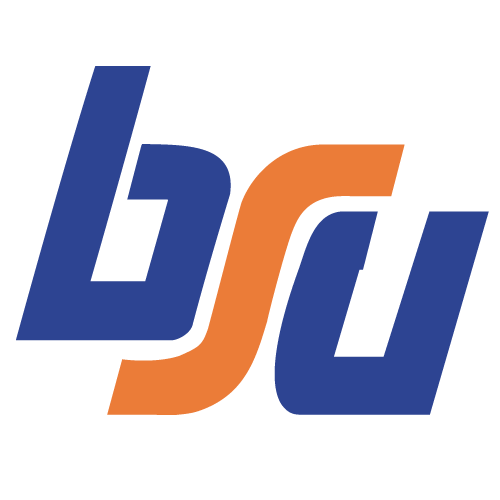

Big Sky Regular Season co-champions

National Invitation Tournament, First round
- Conference: Big Sky Conference
- Record: 23–7 (13–3 Big Sky)
- Head coach: Bobby Dye (6th season)
- Assistant coach: Rod Jensen
- Home arena: BSU Pavilion

1988–89 Big Sky men's basketball standings
	Conf.				Overall
Team	W		L	PCT	W		L	PCT
Boise State	13	–	3	.813	23	–	7	.767
Idaho †	13	–	3	.813	25	–	6	.806
Montana	11	–	5	.688	20	–	11	.645
Nevada	10	–	6	.625	16	–	12	.571
Weber State	9	–	7	.563	17	–	11	.607
Montana State	6	–	10	.375	15	–	16	.484
Eastern Washington	5	–	11	.313	8	–	22	.267
Idaho State	4	–	12	.250	9	–	18	.333
Northern Arizona	1	–	15	.063	2	–	25	.074
† Conference tournament winner

The 1988–89 Boise State Broncos men's basketball team represented Boise State University during the 1988–89 NCAA Division I men's basketball season. The Broncos were led by sixth-year head coach Bobby Dye and played their home games on campus at the BSU Pavilion in Boise, Idaho.

They finished the regular season at 22–5 overall, with a 13–3 record in the Big Sky Conference, tied for first in the standings with rival Idaho. In the conference tournament at home in Boise, the top-seeded Broncos again received a bye into the semifinals and defeated Weber State by eleven points. They met second-seeded Idaho in the final and fell by seven.

With the NCAA tournament on their home floor, BSU was invited to the National Invitation Tournament (NIT), and traveled to Stillwater, Oklahoma, where they lost by fourteen points to the Oklahoma State Cowboys of the Big Eight Conference.

The Broncos were led on the court by senior guard Chris Childs, who went on to a lengthy professional career, ending with nine years in the NBA.

== Postseason results ==
Date time, TV	Rank^{#}	Opponent^{#}	Result	Record	Site (attendance) city, state
Big Sky tournament
Fri, March 10; 8:37 pm	(1)	(5) Weber State; Semifinal	W 71–60	23–5	BSU Pavilion (10,600); Boise, Idaho
Sat, March 11; 9:07 pm, ESPN	(1)	(2) Idaho; Final	L 52–59	23–6	BSU Pavilion (11,576); Boise, Idaho
National Invitation tournament
Fri, March 17*; 6:30 pm		at Oklahoma State; First round	L 55–69	23–7	Gallagher-Iba Arena (5,675); Stillwater, Oklahoma
*Non-conference game. ^{#}Rankings from AP Poll. (#) Tournament seedings in parentheses. All times are in Mountain time.
