= 1993–94 Idaho Vandals men's basketball team =

American college basketball season

1993–94 Idaho Vandals men's basketball
- Conference: Big Sky Conference
- Record: 18–10 (9–5 Big Sky)
- Head coach: Joe Cravens (1st season)
- Home arena: Kibbie Dome

1993–94 Big Sky men's basketball standings
	Conf.				Overall
Team	W		L	PCT	W		L	PCT
Weber State	10	–	4	.714	20	–	10	.667
Idaho State	10	–	4	.714	18	–	9	.667
Idaho	9	–	5	.643	18	–	10	.643
Montana State	8	–	6	.571	16	–	11	.593
Boise State †	7	–	7	.500	17	–	13	.567
Montana	6	–	8	.429	19	–	9	.679
Northern Arizona	6	–	8	.429	13	–	13	.500
Eastern Washington	0	–	14	.000	5	–	21	.192
† Conference tournament winner

The 1993–94 Idaho Vandals men's basketball team represented the University of Idaho during the 1993–94 NCAA Division I men's basketball season. Members of the Big Sky Conference, the Vandals were led by first-year head coach Joe Cravens and played their home games on campus at the Kibbie Dome in Moscow, Idaho.

The Vandals were 17–9 overall in the regular season and 9–5 in conference play, third in the league standings. At the conference tournament in Boise, the Vandals defeated sixth-seed Montana in the opening round, but lost to league runner-up Idaho State in the semifinals.

== Postseason results ==
Date time, TV	Rank^{#}	Opponent^{#}	Result	Record	Site (attendance) city, state
Big Sky tournament
Thu, March 10; 5:35 pm	(3)	vs. (6) Montana; Quarterfinal	W 74–63	18–9	BSU Pavilion (5,103); Boise, Idaho
Fri, March 11; 5:07 pm	(3)	vs. (2) Idaho State; Semifinal	L 66–73	18–10	BSU Pavilion (6,440); Boise, Idaho
*Non-conference game. (#) Tournament seedings in parentheses. All times are in Pacific time.
