= Clovis North High School =

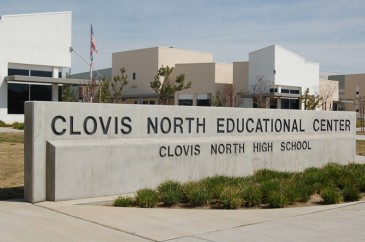

Location
- 2770 East International Avenue; Fresno, California 93730; United States; 36.8898°N 119.7334°W

Information
- School type: Public Combined Middle / High School
- Motto: Unity, Courage and Commitment
- School district: Clovis Unified School District
- Superintendent: Joshua Shapiro
- Principal: Alicynne Chaney
- Teaching staff: 112.35 (FTE)
- Grades: 9–12
- Enrollment: 2,400 (2023–2024)
- International students: Yes
- Student to teacher ratio: 21.36
- Schedule type: Mixed
- Hours in school day: Seven
- Colors: Columbia blue and black
- Slogan: Broncos Unite!
- Song: Clovis North Alma Mater
- Fight song: Clovis North Fight Song
- Athletics: CIF Division I
- Athletics conference: CIF-Central Section
- Mascot: Bronco
- Team name: Broncos
- Rival: Buchanan High School, Clovis West, Clovis East High School, Clovis High
- Newspaper: The Bronco Newsletter
- Yearbook: Bronco Stampede
- School fees: None
- Tuition: Free
- Feeder schools: Granite Ridge Intermediate School
- Website: cnhs.cusd.com

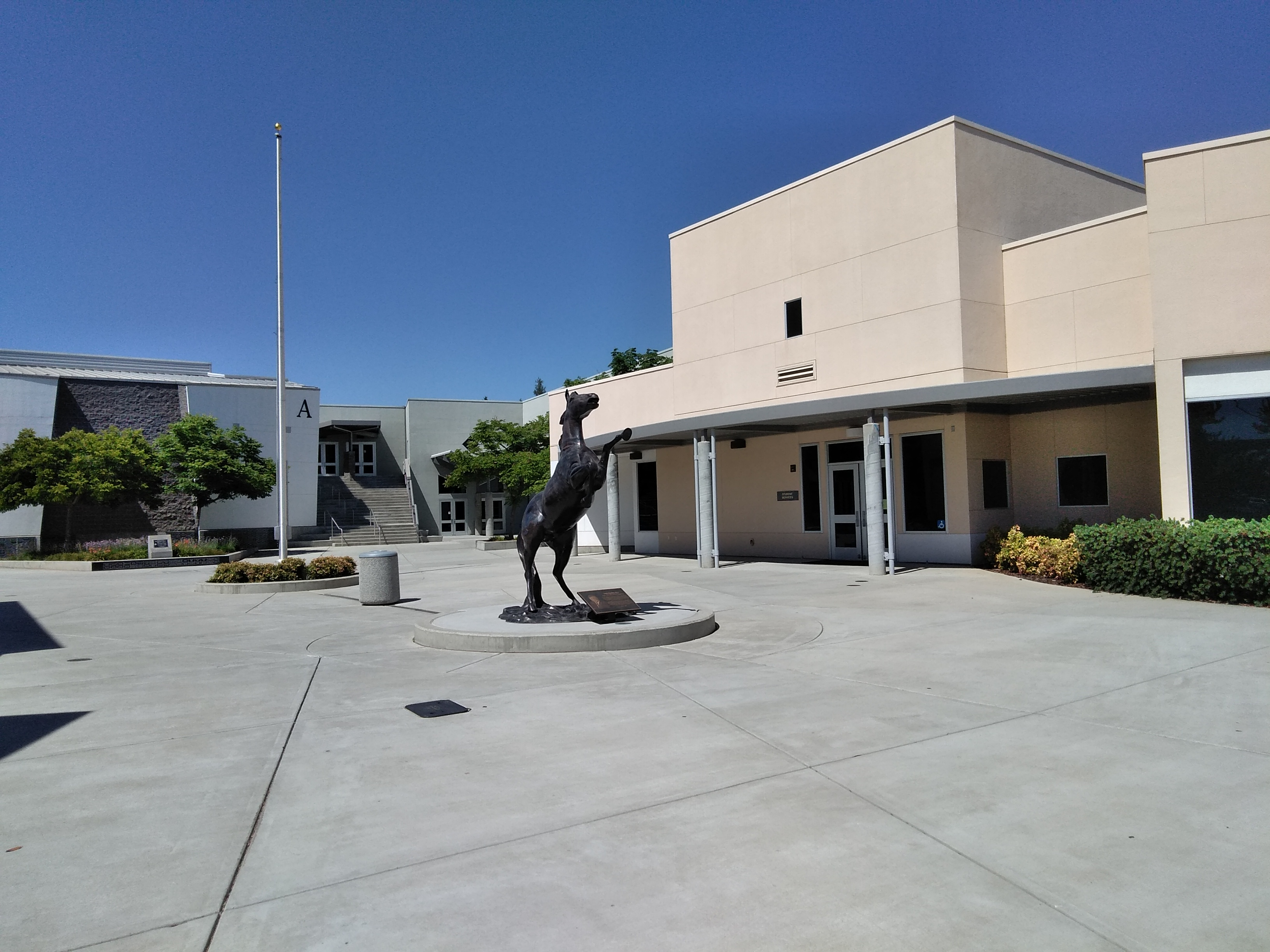
The statue of a bronco is displayed as the mascot for Clovis North Educational Center.

Clovis North High School is a combination junior high school (grades 7 and 8) and high school (grades 9–12) sharing a common administration, campus, and teaching staff. It is located on the corner of Willow & International in Fresno, California, across the street from Clovis Community College Center. It is composed of Clovis North High School and Granite Ridge Intermediate.

Clovis North is ranked 133rd within California. Students have the opportunity to take Advanced Placement course work and exams. The AP participation rate at Clovis North is 61 percent. Clovis North is ranked #835 in the National Rankings and earned a silver medal. Schools are ranked based on their performance on state-required tests and how well they prepare students for college. In 2007, Clovis North Educational Center was established as Clovis Unified School District's fifth high school, and fifth junior high school.

== Academics ==
Clovis North offers nineteen AP classes as well as six honors classes, two comprehensive four-year foreign language programs, and a variety of performing and visual arts classes including drama, photography, ceramics, art, videography, choir, orchestra, color guard, and band among others. Additionally, students have the option of, as a Junior or Senior, taking vocationally-oriented courses through the Regional Occupational Training program or CART high school. Clovis North and Granite Ridge have the highest API based on state testing in the entirety of Clovis Unified School District.

== Honors societies and awards ==
Clovis North Educational Center gives out multiple awards each year and its students are part of multiple honors societies. The school gives out awards for Athlete of the Year for both boys and girls sports. It also bestows the title of Academic Scholar of Distinction if a student takes at least five AP classes and passes two AP exams by the end of his or her junior year. Additionally, a student can become a member of the National Honor Society if selected by a committee of teachers, counselors, and administrators on campus. Honor Roll, High Honor Roll, and Principal's Honor Roll is based on a student's unweighted GPA each semester. Sophomores are nominated each year to become members of the National Society of High School Scholars. A student is designated a valedictorian if they received no B's throughout their first seven semesters. The students with the top 20 GPA's are also recognized at the graduation ceremony and in the yearbook.

The Mock Trial team won three straight county championships between 2010 and 2012 in addition to placing 3rd and 4th at the state competitions. They triumphed again in the 2016 county competition to make it to the state competition.

The Science Olympiad team has competed at the state championship multiple years in a row. Clovis North has made it to the state level, but have yet to reach the national level. The Forensics team won valley championships in 2011 and 2013.

The FIRST Robotics Competition team, after winning the Davis regional competition, traveled to the FIRST Championship in 2010. Academic Decathlon won their first Division III Championship in 2013.

== Athletics ==
Varsity Athletics

Boys

- Fall: Football, Water Polo, Cross Country
- Winter: Soccer, Basketball, Wrestling
- Spring: Baseball, Tennis, Swimming and Diving, Track and Field, Volleyball, Golf

Girls

- Fall: Gymnastics, Water Polo, Tennis, Cross Country, Volleyball, Golf
- Winter: Soccer, Basketball
- Spring: Badminton, Track and Field, Softball, Swimming and Diving

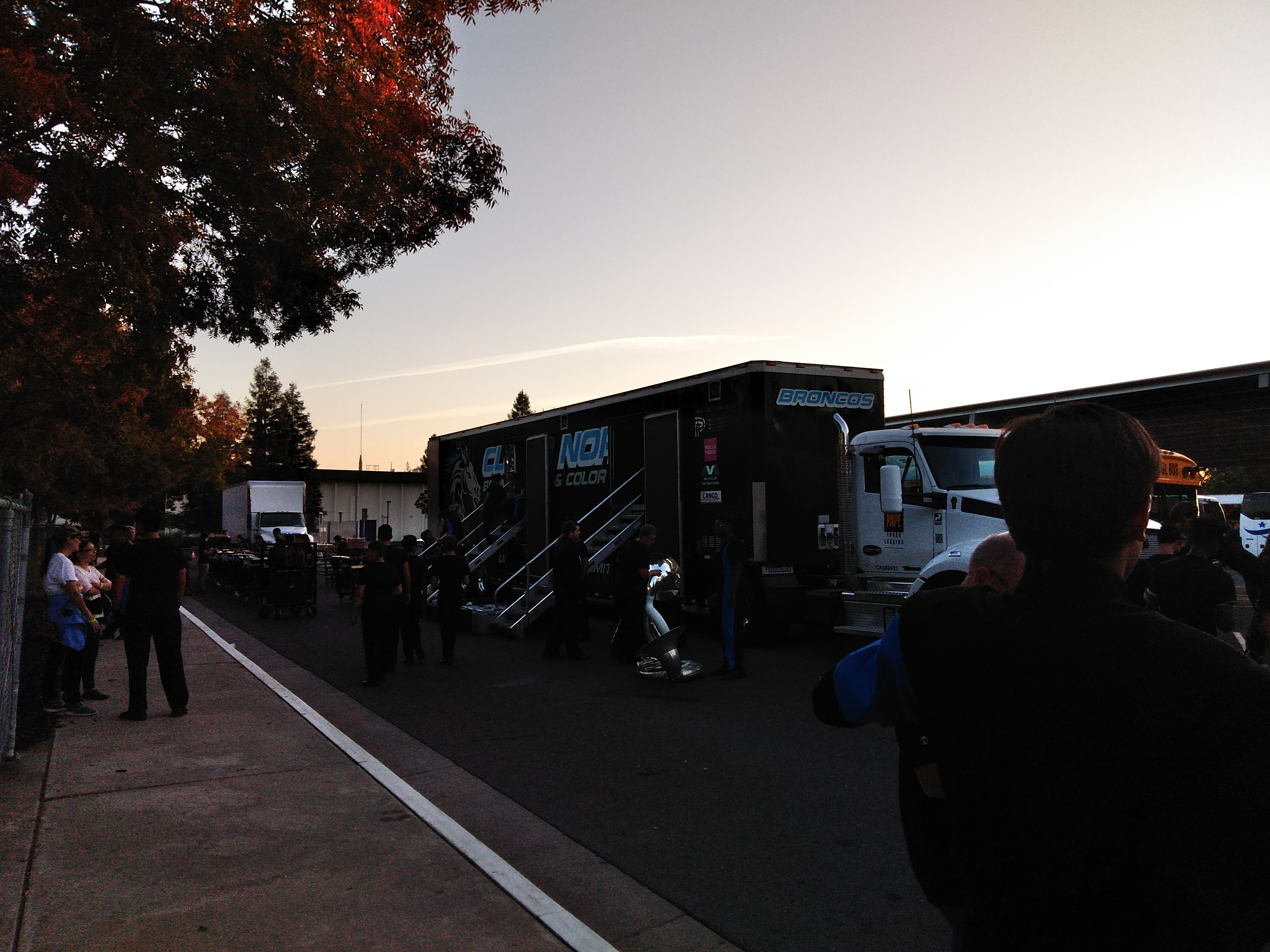
Clovis North Marching Band and Color Guard unloading instruments and equipment prepare for competition in the 2018 Golden State Tournament of Bands at Clovis, CA.

== Performing arts ==
The Clovis North Educational Music Department consists of a variety of performing experiences for students at all grade and ability levels including: an award-winning Marching Band, two high school Concert Bands at the beginning and advanced levels, a high school String Ensemble, Symphony Orchestra that includes students in grades 7 – 12, two Jazz Ensembles at the beginning and advanced levels, three middle school Concert Bands at the beginning, intermediate, and advanced levels, three middle school String Ensembles, Winter Percussion Ensembles, Winter Color Guard, Chamber Ensembles, and award-winning Choir Ensembles.

Notable achievements of the band and color guard program at Clovis North include: Western Band Association (WBA) 2013 1A/2A/3A Class Grand Champions, a featured performing ensemble at the 2016 Music For All National Concert band Festival, selection for the 2017 Midwest Clinic.

Within the choir program notable achievements include: Clovis North Chamber Choir and the Women's Chorale have been invited to sing many times in the Fresno State Command Performance concert and the Women's Chorale placed third in a California Choral Invitational in 2011. Chamber and Chorale were both accepted to the 15th Annual New York Choral Festival in 2015. The festival accepts both high school and college choirs, but only five choirs total – two of those five from Clovis North. The other three choirs were from Germany, Estonia, and Montclair State University. The choirs performed in Carnegie Hall and St. Paul the Apostle Church in New York.

== Notable alumni ==
- Rhesa Foster (born 1998), American long jumper
- Brennan Malone, Pittsburgh Pirates prospect
- Terri Miller Jr., basketball player
- David Wells, NFL player

== Controversy ==
In 2014, the Clovis Unified School District and one of its counselors, Kelly Racca, were sued by two students for civil rights violations, negligent supervision, and intentional infliction of emotional distress. The lawsuit alleged that Racca enlisted the students in a sting operation to uncover drug sales on campus by having them purchase marijuana from a student dealer without notifying the police or the students' parents. When one of the students was arrested, school officials including Racca and administrator Wesley Flowers allegedly tried to cover up the operation and coerce the students to retract their statements, leading to accusations of a cover-up and potential harm to the students. The lawsuit was settled in 2017 for $300,000.
