= Joe Cravens =

American basketball coach (born 1954)

Biographical details
- Born: March 9, 1954 (age 72); Scottsburg, Indiana, U.S.

Playing career
- 1972–1974: Brunswick JC
- 1974–1976: Texas–Arlington
- Position: Guard

Coaching career (HC unless noted)
- 1977–1978: Texas–Arlington (asst.)
- 1978–1981: Southwest Texas State (asst.)
- 1981–1985: Texas–Arlington (asst.)
- 1985–1989: Washington (asst.)
- 1989–1993: Utah (asst.)
- 1989–1990: Utah (interim HC)
- 1993–1996: Idaho
- 1996–1997: UC Irvine (asst.)
- 1997–1999: Weber State (asst.)
- 1999–2006: Weber State

Head coaching record
- Overall: 170–141 (.547)

Joseph Dale Cravens (born March 9, 1954) is an American former college basketball coach. He was the head coach at Idaho, Weber State, and the interim head coach at Utah for most of a season.

Born and raised in Scottsburg, Indiana, Cravens played college basketball at Brunswick Junior College in Georgia and transferred to Texas–Arlington for his final two seasons. He was an assistant coach for a year at his alma mater, then at Southwest Texas State in San Marcos for three years, and returned to Texas–Arlington.

In 1985, he joined the staff of new head coach Andy Russo at Washington in Seattle for four years in the Pac-10, then went to Utah under new head coach Rick Majerus in 1989. In mid-December, Majerus required major heart surgery and Cravens took over as interim head coach of the Utes in the WAC for the remainder of that first season.

After four years in Salt Lake City, Cravens was hired as head coach at Idaho in Moscow in April 1993, succeeding Larry Eustachy, and led the Vandals on the Palouse for three seasons. After Idaho, he coached in Switzerland that summer, then was an assistant at UC Irvine for a season, and for two more back in the state of Utah at Weber State in Ogden under Ron Abegglen. Promoted to head coach in March 1999, he compiled a 116–88 (.569) record in seven seasons. Cravens led the 2003 team to an undefeated (14–0) record in the Big Sky Conference (26–6 overall), but the Wildcats fell to fifth-seed Wisconsin in the NCAA tournament's first round at Spokane.

== After collegiate coaching ==
Cravens is a college basketball analyst on the MountainWest Sports Network; he formerly coached girls' basketball at St. Joseph Catholic High School in Ogden. In his second year as coach at St. Joseph, Cravens led his girls to the 2011–12 1-A state championship. They defeated Milford 29–23 in the opening round, Manila 51–23 in the quarterfinals, Piute 63–41 in the semifinals, and heavily favored and defending 1-A champion Rich 45–34 in the finals.

Despite losing several key players after their first title, Cravens led the defending champs to an undefeated season in 2012–13, including victory in their second state title game over Piute, 39–29. He stepped down as coach after the 2015 season, but remained at the school as a counselor.

== Head coaching record ==
NCAA Division I

Record table
Season	Coach	Overall	Conference	Standing	Postseason
Utah Utes (WAC) (1989–1990)
1989–90	Utah	12–12	7–9	6th	
Utah (interim):		12–12 (.500)	7–9 (.438)		
Idaho Vandals (Big Sky) (1993–1996)
1993–94	Idaho	18–10	9–5	3rd	
1994–95	Idaho	12–15	6–8	6th	
1995–96	Idaho	12–16	5–9	6th	
Idaho:		42–41 (.506)	20–22 (.476)		
Weber State Wildcats (Big Sky) (1999–2006)
1999–00	Weber State	18–10	10–6	t-4th	
2000–01	Weber State	15–14	8–8	t-4th	
2001–02	Weber State	18–11	8–6	3rd	
2002–03	Weber State	26–6	14–0	1st	NCAA first round
2003–04	Weber State	15–14	7–7	2rd	
2004–05	Weber State	14–16	7–7	5th	
2005–06	Weber State	10–17	4–10	t-7th	
Weber State:		116–88 (.569)	58–44 (.569)		
Total:		170–141 (.547)			
National champion Postseason invitational champion Conference regular season champion Conference regular season and conference tournament champion Division regular season champion Division regular season and conference tournament champion Conference tournament champion

- Cravens became interim head coach at Utah prior to the seventh game of the 1989–90 season.
