= David Wells (American football) =

American football player (born 1995)

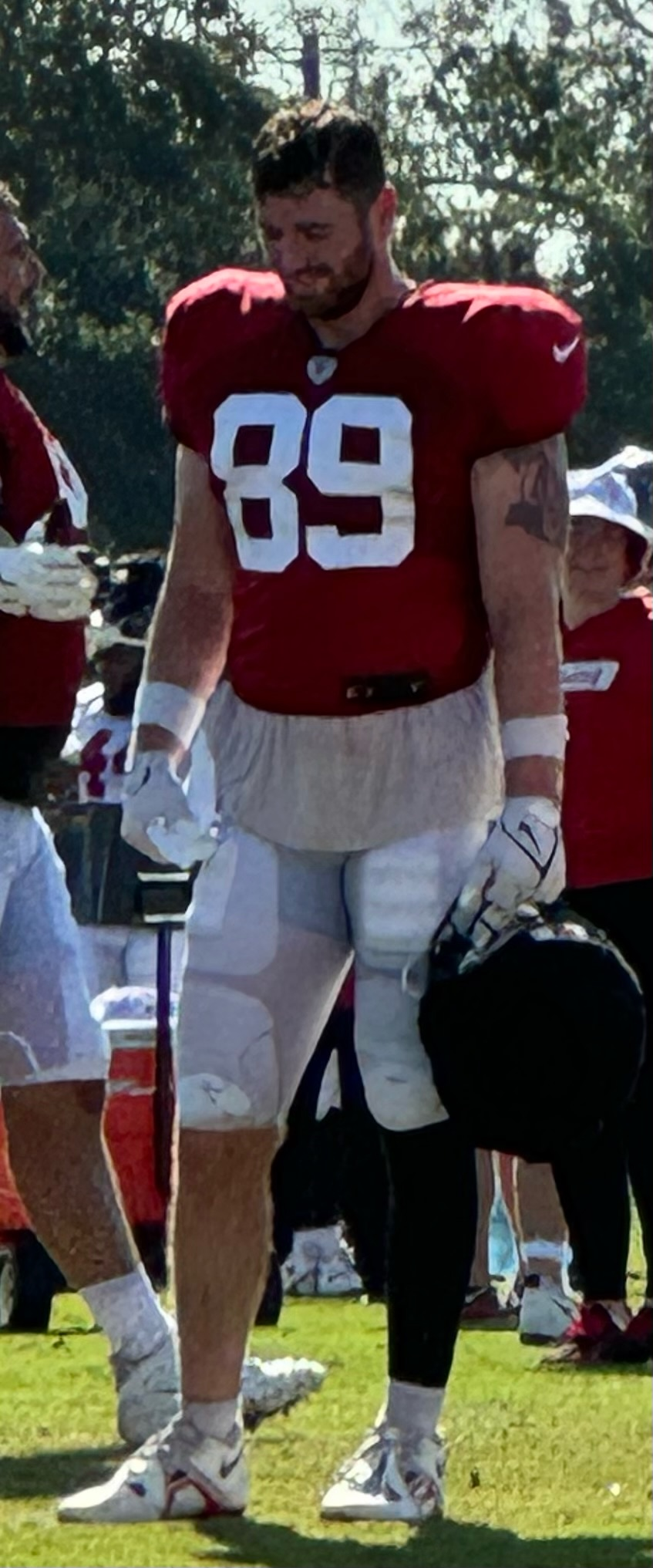
- Wells with the Tampa Bay Buccaneers at training camp in 2024

Profile
- Position: Tight end

Personal information
- Born: May 2, 1995 (age 31); Fresno, California, U.S.
- Listed height: 6 ft 6 in (1.98 m)
- Listed weight: 260 lb (118 kg)

Career information
- High school: Clovis North (Fresno, California)
- College: San Diego State (2013–2017)
- NFL draft: 2018: undrafted

Career history
- Dallas Cowboys (2018)*; Kansas City Chiefs (2018–2019); New England Patriots (2020–2021)*; Atlanta Falcons (2021)*; Indianapolis Colts (2021)*; Arizona Cardinals (2021); Tennessee Titans (2022)*; Tampa Bay Buccaneers (2022–2023)
- * Offseason or practice squad member only

Awards and highlights
- 2× Second-team All-Mountain West (2016, 2017)

Career NFL statistics as of 2023
- Receptions: 2
- Receiving yards: -10
- Stats at Pro Football Reference

David Edward Wells (born May 2, 1995) is an American professional football tight end. He played college football at San Diego State.

== Early life ==
Wells attended Clovis North High School. He initially played as a quarterback, before being converted into a tight end.

As a senior, he tallied 60 catches for 1,188 yards (19.8-yard avg.) and 10 touchdowns. He contributed to the team winning the 2012 CIF Central Section Division I championship and having a 12-2 record. He received All-league and All-Valley honors.

He also practiced basketball and baseball.

== College career ==
Wells accepted a football scholarship from San Diego State University. As a redshirt freshman, he appeared in 12 games, mostly on special teams, without recording any offensive stats.

As a sophomore, he appeared in 14 games as a backup and special teams player. He was the named the second-string tight end behind Daniel Brunskill after the seventh game of the season. He had 4 receptions for 22 yards.

As a junior, he started in 14 games after Brunskill was converted into a right tackle. He was used mostly as a blocking tight end for a running game spearheaded by Donnel Pumphrey and Rashaad Penny. He registered 25 receptions for 294 yards (11.8-yard avg.), 4 touchdowns, a 2-point conversion reception and a special teams tackle. He had 5 catches for 62 yards and one touchdown against San Jose State University.

As a senior, he started 9 of the 11 games he appeared in, mostly blocking for Penny. He collected 9 receptions for 133 yards (14.8-yard avg.) and 2 touchdowns. He missed the season opener while recovering from a Jones fracture in his foot.

== Professional career ==
Pre-draft measurables
Height	Weight	Arm length	Hand span	40-yard dash	10-yard split	20-yard split	20-yard shuttle	Three-cone drill	Vertical jump	Broad jump	Bench press
6 ft 5 5/8 in (1.97 m)	256 lb (116 kg)	32 1/4 in (0.82 m)	9 5/8 in (0.24 m)	4.75 s	1.61 s	2.74 s	4.59 s	7.50 s	33.0 in (0.84 m)	9 ft 8 in (2.95 m)	20 reps
All values from NFL Combine

=== Dallas Cowboys ===
Wells was signed as an undrafted free agent by the Dallas Cowboys after the 2018 NFL draft on May 1, 2018. He was waived on September 1, as part of final roster cuts.

=== Kansas City Chiefs ===
Wells was signed to the practice squad of the Kansas City Chiefs on September 18, 2018. He remained on the practice squad and signed a reserve/futures contract with the team shortly after the season ended. Wells was waived by the Chiefs with an injury designation on August 9, 2019.

=== New England Patriots ===
Wells was signed by the New England Patriots to their practice squad on November 10, 2020. He was released by the Patriots on November 16. Wells was re-signed by the Patriots on July 23, 2021. He was waived by New England on August 15.

=== Atlanta Falcons ===
Wells was signed by the Atlanta Falcons on August 20, 2021. He was waived during final roster cuts on August 31, but was re-signed to the team's practice squad the next day. Wells was released by Atlanta on September 14.

=== Indianapolis Colts ===
Wells was signed to the Indianapolis Colts' practice squad on September 28, 2021. He was released by the Colts on October 5.

=== Arizona Cardinals ===
Wells was signed to the Arizona Cardinals' practice squad on October 20, 2021. He was signed to the Cardinals' active roster on November 6. Wells was placed on injured reserve on November 11 with a hand injury. He was activated on December 20, then waived the next day and re-signed to the practice squad.

Wells signed a reserve/future contract with the Cardinals on January 19, 2022. He was released by Arizona on July 29.

=== Tennessee Titans ===
On August 13, 2022, Wells signed with the Tennessee Titans. He was waived on August 30, and re-signed to the practice squad the next day. Wells was released by the Titans on September 1.

=== Tampa Bay Buccaneers ===
On September 14, 2022, Wells was signed to the Tampa Bay Buccaneers' practice squad. He was released on September 26, but re-signed on October 19.

Wells signed a reserve/future contract with Tampa Bay on January 17, 2023. During the 3rd quarter of a Week 2 game against the Chicago Bears on September 17, Wells received the only two targets and receptions of his career. His first being for one yard, while his second one was a 11 yard loss and a fumble, which was then recovered by his quarterback Baker Mayfield. On November 22, Wells was waived by the Buccaneers and re-signed to the practice squad.

Wells signed a reserve/future contract with the Buccaneers on January 23, 2024. He was released by Tampa Bay on August 27.
