= Larry Eustachy =

American basketball coach (born 1955)

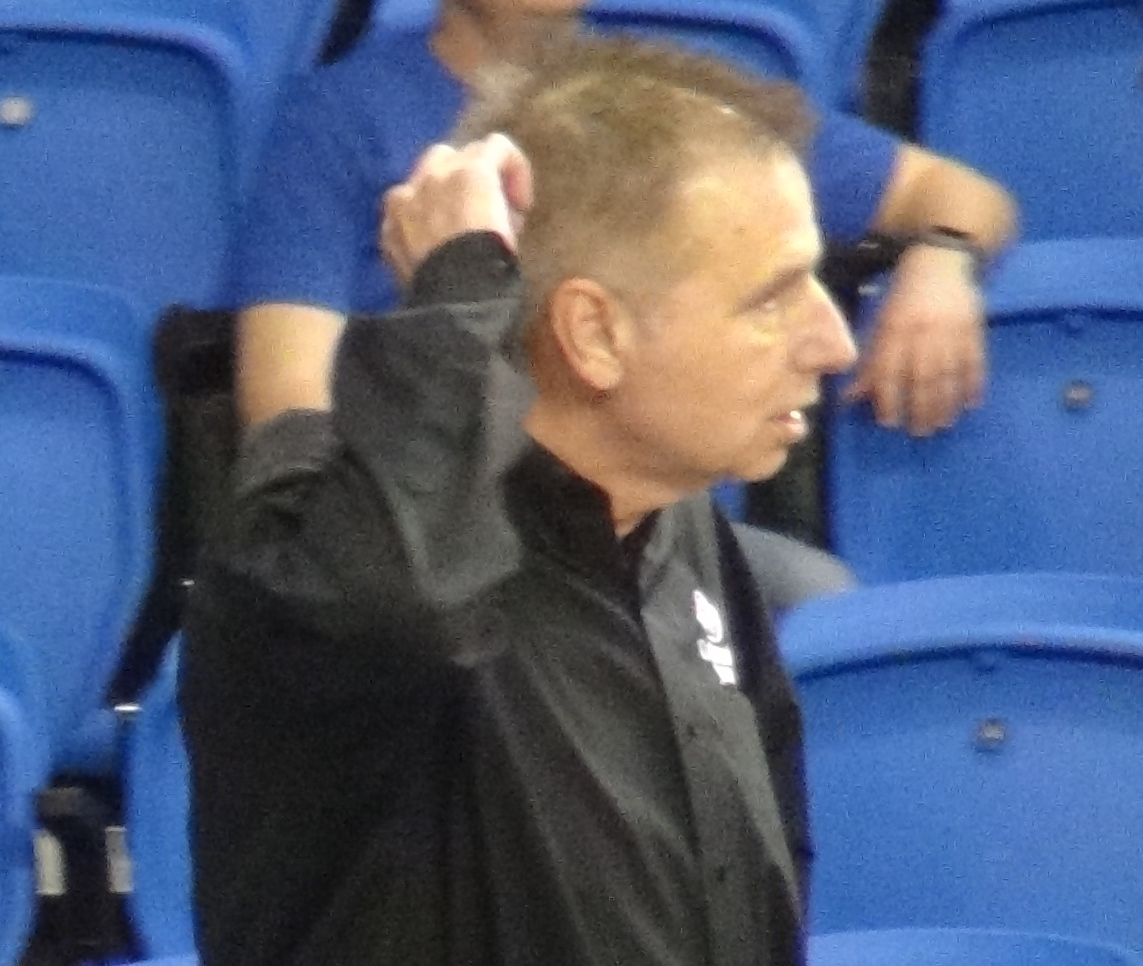
- Eustachy in 2017

Biographical details
- Born: December 1, 1955 (age 70); Alameda, California, U.S.
- Education: Long Beach State

Playing career
- 1975–1976: Citrus CC

Coaching career (HC unless noted)
- 1979–1981: Citrus CC (assistant)
- 1981–1986: Mississippi State (assistant)
- 1986–1987: Idaho (assistant)
- 1987–1989: Utah (assistant)
- 1989–1990: Ball State (assistant)
- 1990–1993: Idaho
- 1993–1998: Utah State
- 1998–2003: Iowa State
- 2004–2012: Southern Miss
- 2012–2018: Colorado State
- 2023–2024: Boise State (Senior advisor)

Head coaching record
- Overall: 523–330

Accomplishments and honors

Championships
- Big 12 tournament (2000); 2 Big 12 regular season (2000, 2001); Big West tournament (1998); 3 Big West regular season (1995, 1997, 1998); Big Sky regular season (1993)

Awards
- AP Coach of the Year (2000); Henry Iba Award (2000); Mountain West Coach of the Year (2017); Conference USA Coach of the Year (2012); 2× Big 12 Coach of the Year (2000, 2001); 2× Big West Coach of the Year (1995, 1998)

Larry Robert Eustachy (born December 1, 1955 in Alameda, California) is an American college basketball coach, most recently the head coach of the Colorado State Rams (2012–2018). He was previously the head coach at Idaho (1990–1993), Utah State (1993–1998), Iowa State (1998–2003), and Southern Mississippi (2004–2012).

Eustachy was the AP Coach of the Year in 2000 after leading Iowa State to the Elite Eight in the NCAA tournament.

== Coaching career ==
=== Idaho ===
At age 34, Eustachy became a head coach at Idaho in April 1990, succeeding Kermit Davis, who left the Palouse for Texas A&M after consecutive Big Sky titles and NCAA tournament appearances. He had been an assistant in Moscow for a season (1986–87) under Tim Floyd, and Eustachy's first-year salary as head coach was $52,500. In his third year, he led the Vandals to the regular season championship in 1993, but they lost the tourney title game at home. Idaho was not selected for the NIT, and Eustachy departed a few days later.

=== Utah State ===
Eustachy took over the reins in Logan in March 1993, and had a very successful five-year stretch at Utah State; his teams won the Big West regular season three times and won the conference tournament in 1998. The Aggies were seeded thirteenth in the West region of the NCAA tournament, and fell to Maryland in the first round at Sacramento.

=== Iowa State ===
Eustachy was named head coach at Iowa State in late July 1998, after Tim Floyd left for the NBA's Chicago Bulls. Following a lackluster first season, the Cyclones had their best season in school history in 2000. They won a school record 32 games and came within one game of the Final Four, and Eustachy was named AP Coach of the Year. After consecutive Big 12 Conference titles in 2001, he signed a contract extension that, with incentives, made him the highest-paid state employee in Iowa.

==== Suspension and resignation ====
On April 28, 2003, The Des Moines Register carried pictures of Eustachy kissing several young women and holding a beer at a party near the University of Missouri's campus just hours after the Tigers defeated his Cyclones on Tuesday, January 21. The Register also reported that Eustachy had been seen at a fraternity party at Kansas State hours after his team lost to the Wildcats. On April 30, athletic director Bruce Van De Velde suspended Eustachy with pay and recommended that he be fired for violating a morals clause in his contract. Eustachy held a press conference in which he apologized for his behavior and admitted he had recently begun rehab treatment for alcoholism. He initially indicated he would contest the suspension, but announced his resignation on May 5.

During the scandal, the Register reported that Iowa State documents showed that the NCAA cited Eustachy for rules violations related to paying players, including Jackson Vroman, for making free throws.

=== Southern Mississippi ===
On March 25, 2004, after a year out of coaching, Eustachy was hired as head coach at Southern Miss. In 2008, he took a leave of absence on January 9 to be with his ailing mother. Following the 2008–09 season, he returned his $25,000 bonus from the university, saying that after a disappointing season, he did not feel as though he had earned it.

In 2011, Southern Miss went 21–10 and 9–7 in Conference USA play. The team failed to receive a bid to the NCAA tournament and turned down invites to the CBI and CIT.

On February 25, 2012, Eustachy recorded his 400th career victory.

In that same 2012 season, Eustachy led Southern Miss to a 25-9 season, a second-place finish in Conference USA, and the Golden Eagles’ first appearance in the NCAA Tournament since 1990, earning an at-large bid as an #9 seed. They would lose in the first round to #8 seed Kansas State. This still remains as the only appearance for Southern Miss in the NCAA Tournament since 1990, and just their 3rd overall appearance (1989, 1990, and 2012).

=== Colorado State ===
On April 12, 2012, Eustachy left Southern Miss and was introduced as the 19th head basketball coach in Colorado State history, after Tim Miles left for Nebraska of the Big Ten Conference. Eustachy inherited a senior-laden roster that featured four returning starters and Minnesota-transfer Colton Iverson. The Rams were coming off a 20–12 season in which they made the NCAA tournament and lost to Murray State in the second round. CSU greatly improved in rebounding and defensively, leading to a historic season for the program. CSU cracked the top 25 rankings for the first time since 1954 during the season. At 11–5 the Rams finished second in the Mountain West, their highest finish in program history. For the second straight year, the Rams earned an at-large bid to the NCAA tournament, this time as a No. 8 seed against Missouri. The Rams defeated the Tigers 84–72 to give Eustachy his first NCAA Tournament win since the Elite Eight run at Iowa State. It was CSU's first NCAA Tournament win since 1989 and a program record 26th win. CSU lost in the second round to top-seeded Louisville, ending the season 26–9.

In August 2013, Eustachy signed a new contract to become the highest-paid coach in the Mountain West Conference. He has a base salary of $910,000 per year and will increase by two percent each following season, along with bonuses on top of it.

In 2017, Eustachy recorded his 500th career victory on January 7. On March 5, he was named Mountain West Conference Coach of the year, after leading a CSU team with only seven available players to a second place conference finish in the MWC.

In February 2017, The Coloradoan revealed that a 2014 Colorado State internal investigation recommended Eustachy's firing due to creating a culture of fear and intimidation by emotionally and verbally abusing his players and staff. However, Colorado State retained Eustachy and required him to attend anger management sessions, apologize to his team, and follow a zero-tolerance policy for directing profane language towards others or throwing or hitting objects, for which violations would result in termination for cause.

On February 3, 2018, Colorado State placed Eustachy on administrative leave and promoted associate head coach Steve Barnes to interim head coach pending the completion of another inquiry into Eustachy's behavior. Colorado State confirmed the existence of that second investigation three days earlier on January 31; Eustachy resigned on February 26.

=== Boise State ===
On July 27, 2023, it was announced that Eustachy will be working with Leon Rice and the Boise State men’s basketball team as a volunteer senior advisor to the head coach for the upcoming season.

== Head coaching record ==
Record table
Season	Team	Overall	Conference	Standing	Postseason
Idaho Vandals (Big Sky Conference) (1990–1993)
1990–91	Idaho	19–11	11–5	3rd	
1991–92	Idaho	18–14	10–6	T–3rd	
1992–93	Idaho	24–8	11–3	1st	
Idaho:		61–33 (.649)	32–14 (.696)		
Utah State Aggies (Big West Conference) (1993–1998)
1993–94	Utah State	14–13	11–7	T–2nd	
1994–95	Utah State	21–8	14–4	1st	NIT First Round
1995–96	Utah State	18–15	10–8	4th	
1996–97	Utah State	20–9	12–4	1st	
1997–98	Utah State	25–8	13–3	1st	NCAA Division I Round of 64
Utah State:		98–53 (.649)	60–26 (.698)		
Iowa State Cyclones (Big 12 Conference) (1998–2003)
1998–99	Iowa State	15–15	6–10	9th	
1999–00	Iowa State	32–5	14–2	1st	NCAA Division I Elite Eight
2000–01	Iowa State	25–6	13–3	1st	NCAA Division I Round of 64
2001–02	Iowa State	12–19	4–12	T–10th	
2002–03	Iowa State	17–14	5–11	T–9th	NIT Second Round
Iowa State:		101–59 (.631)	42–38 (.525)		
Southern Miss Golden Eagles (Conference USA) (2004–2012)
2004–05	Southern Miss	11–17	2–14	14th	
2005–06	Southern Miss	10–21	3–11	11th	
2006–07	Southern Miss	20–11	9–7	T–4th	
2007–08	Southern Miss	19–14	9–7	T–4th	
2008–09	Southern Miss	15–17	4–12	T–10th	
2009–10	Southern Miss	20–14	8–8	6th	CIT First Round
2010–11	Southern Miss	22–10	9–7	T–5th	
2011–12	Southern Miss	25–9	11–5	2nd	NCAA Division I Round of 64
Southern Miss:		142–113 (.557)	55–71 (.437)		
Colorado State Rams (Mountain West Conference) (2012–2018)
2012–13	Colorado State	26–9	11–5	2nd	NCAA Division I Round of 32
2013–14	Colorado State	16–16	7–11	T–8th	
2014–15	Colorado State	27–7	13–5	3rd	NIT First Round
2015–16	Colorado State	18–16	8–10	T–6th	
2016–17	Colorado State	24–12	13–5	2nd	NIT Second Round
2017–18	Colorado State	10–14	3–8		
Colorado State:		121–74 (.621)	55–44 (.556)		
Total:		523–330 (.613)			
National champion Postseason invitational champion Conference regular season champion Conference regular season and conference tournament champion Division regular season champion Division regular season and conference tournament champion Conference tournament champion
