= Lawrence Butler (basketball) =

American basketball player (1957–2018)

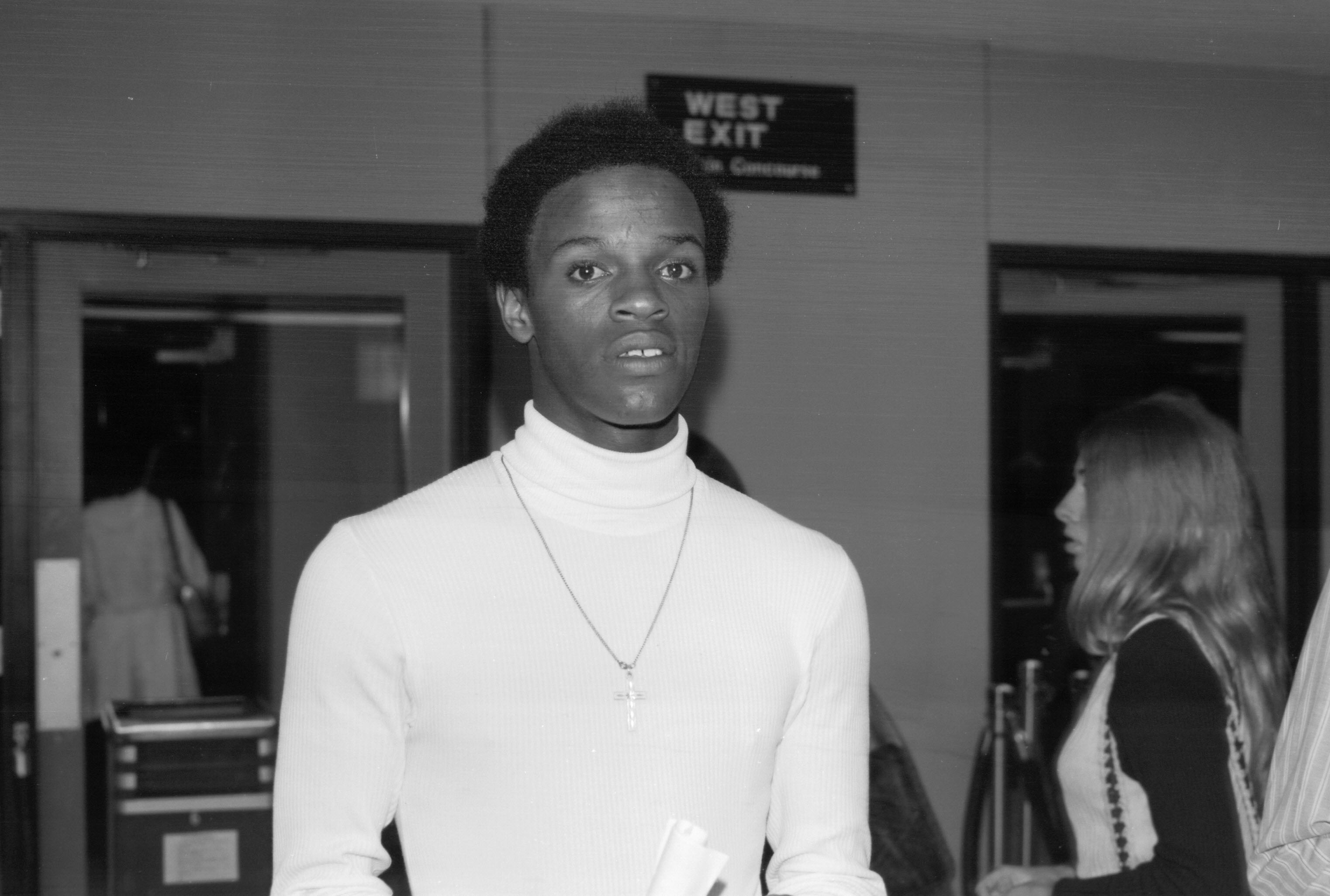
- Butler in 1974

Personal information
- Born: March 15, 1957 Glasgow, Missouri, U.S.
- Died: October 23, 2018 (aged 61) Columbia, Missouri, U.S.
- Listed height: 6 ft 3 in (1.91 m)
- Listed weight: 180 lb (82 kg)

Career information
- High school: Glasgow (Glasgow, Missouri)
- College: Western Texas (1975–1977); Idaho State (1977–1979)
- NBA draft: 1979: 2nd round, 33rd overall pick
- Drafted by: Chicago Bulls
- Position: Shooting guard

Career highlights
- Honorable mention All-American – AP (1979); NCAA scoring champion (1979); Big Sky Player of the Year (1979); 2× First-team All-Big Sky (1978, 1979)
- Stats at Basketball Reference

Lawrence Eugene Butler (March 15, 1957 – October 23, 2018) was an American basketball player. He led NCAA Division I in scoring while playing for the Idaho State Bengals during the 1978–79 season. Butler was selected by the Chicago Bulls in the 1979 NBA draft although he never played professionally.

Butler was born in Glasgow, Missouri, and attended Glasgow High School. He began his college basketball career at Western Texas Community College. He transferred to Idaho State for his final two seasons. In Lawrence's junior year and his first at Idaho State, he averaged 23.8 points in 26 games played, which led the conference in scoring. The following season, Lawrence's per-game scoring average jumped to 30.1, beating out future Basketball Hall of Famer Larry Bird of Indiana State for the national scoring title. He was the first ever recipient of the Big Sky Conference Men's Basketball Player of the Year award and was selected to play in the Aloha Classic Basketball All-Star Game, in which the nation's top players were chosen to play. Butler scored a game-high 18 points as his West team defeated the Midwest team, 119–107.

After his collegiate career had ended, the Chicago Bulls selected Butler in the second round as the 33rd overall pick of the 1979 NBA draft, but he decided not to pursue a professional career in basketball. He returned to Missouri and worked at the Marshall Habilitation Center for 30 years until his retirement in 2011. Butler died at the Boone Hospital Center in Columbia, Missouri, on October 23, 2018, aged 61.

== See also ==
- List of NCAA Division I men's basketball season scoring leaders
