= 1992–93 Boise State Broncos men's basketball team =

American college basketball season

1992–93 Boise State Broncos men's basketball
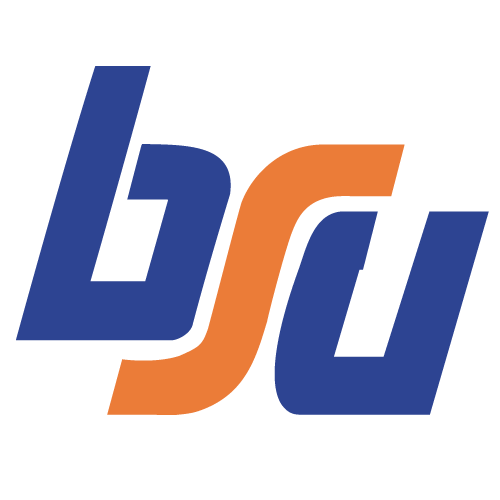

Big Sky tournament champions

NCAA tournament, First round
- Conference: Big Sky Conference
- Record: 21–8 (10–4 Big Sky)
- Head coach: Bobby Dye (10th season)
- Assistant coach: Rod Jensen (10th season)
- Home arena: BSU Pavilion

1992–93 Big Sky men's basketball standings
| | Conf. | | | | Overall |
| Team | W | | L | PCT | W | | L | PCT |
|---|---|---|---|---|---|---|---|---|
| Idaho | 11 | – | 3 | .786 | 24 | – | 8 | .750 |
| Boise State † | 10 | – | 4 | .714 | 21 | – | 8 | .724 |
| Weber State | 10 | – | 4 | .714 | 20 | – | 8 | .714 |
| Montana | 8 | – | 6 | .571 | 17 | – | 11 | .607 |
| Idaho State | 5 | – | 9 | .357 | 10 | – | 18 | .357 |
| Montana State | 5 | – | 9 | .357 | 9 | – | 18 | .333 |
| Northern Arizona | 4 | – | 10 | .286 | 10 | – | 16 | .385 |
| Eastern Washington | 3 | – | 11 | .214 | 6 | – | 20 | .231 |
† Conference tournament winner

The 1992–93 Boise State Broncos men's basketball team represented Boise State University during the 1992–93 NCAA Division I men's basketball season. The Broncos were led by tenth-year head coach Bobby Dye and played their home games on campus at the BSU Pavilion in Boise, Idaho.

They finished the regular season at 19–7 overall, with a 10–4 record in the Big Sky Conference, tied for second in the standings. In the conference tournament at Moscow, Idaho, the second-seeded Broncos received a bye into the semifinals and defeated Weber State by six points. They met top-seeded host Idaho in the final and won by twelve.

The Broncos received the automatic bid to the NCAA tournament; no other Big Sky members were invited to the tournament or the NIT. Boise State was seeded fourteenth in the West regional and lost by twenty points in the first round to eighth-ranked Vanderbilt in Salt Lake City. This was the eleventh consecutive year in which the Big Sky representative lost in the first round.

== Postseason results ==
| Date time, TV | Rank^{#} | Opponent^{#} | Result | Record | Site (attendance) city, state |
Big Sky tournament
| Fri, March 12; 7:35 pm | (2) | vs. (3) Weber State; Semifinal | W 69–63 | 20–7 | Kibbie Dome; Moscow, Idaho |
| Sat, March 13; 10:07 pm, ESPN | (2) | at (1) Idaho; Final | W 80–68 | 21–7 | Kibbie Dome (4,800); Moscow, Idaho |
NCAA tournament
| Thu, March 18*; 3:15 pm | (14W) | vs. (3W) No. 8 Vanderbilt; First round | L 72–92 | 21–8 | Huntsman Center (11,389); Salt Lake City, Utah |
*Non-conference game. ^{#}Rankings from AP poll. (#) Tournament seedings in parentheses. All times are in Mountain time.
