= 1993–94 Boise State Broncos men's basketball team =

American college basketball season

1993–94 Boise State Broncos men's basketball
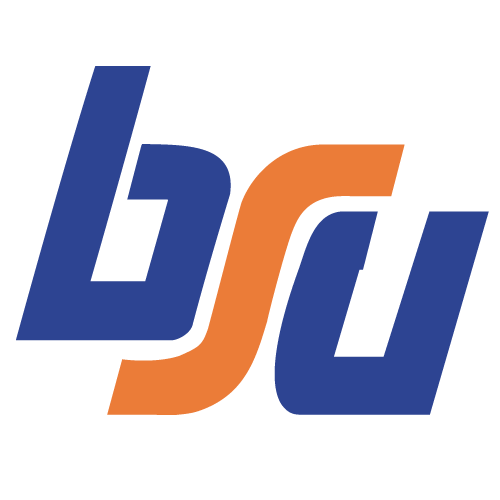

Big Sky tournament champions

NCAA tournament, First round
- Conference: Big Sky Conference
- Record: 17–13 (7–7 Big Sky)
- Head coach: Bobby Dye (11th season)
- Assistant coach: Rod Jensen (11th season)
- Home arena: BSU Pavilion

1993–94 Big Sky men's basketball standings
| | Conf. | | | | Overall |
| Team | W | | L | PCT | W | | L | PCT |
|---|---|---|---|---|---|---|---|---|
| Weber State | 10 | – | 4 | .714 | 20 | – | 10 | .667 |
| Idaho State | 10 | – | 4 | .714 | 18 | – | 9 | .667 |
| Idaho | 9 | – | 5 | .643 | 18 | – | 10 | .643 |
| Montana State | 8 | – | 6 | .571 | 16 | – | 11 | .593 |
| Boise State † | 7 | – | 7 | .500 | 17 | – | 13 | .567 |
| Montana | 6 | – | 8 | .429 | 19 | – | 9 | .679 |
| Northern Arizona | 6 | – | 8 | .429 | 13 | – | 13 | .500 |
| Eastern Washington | 0 | – | 14 | .000 | 5 | – | 21 | .192 |
† Conference tournament winner

The 1993–94 Boise State Broncos men's basketball team represented Boise State University during the 1993–94 NCAA Division I men's basketball season. The Broncos were led by eleventh-year head coach Bobby Dye and played their home games on campus at the BSU Pavilion in Boise, Idaho.

They finished the regular season at 14–12 overall, with a 7–7 record in the Big Sky Conference, fifth in the standings.

In the conference tournament at home in Boise, the fifth-seeded Broncos defeated Montana State by eighteen points in a quarterfinal, and top-seeded Weber State by twelve in a semifinal. In the final against second-seeded Idaho State, BSU won by four points.

For a second consecutive year, the Broncos received the automatic bid to the NCAA tournament without winning the regular season title; no other Big Sky members were invited to the tournament or the NIT. Boise State was seeded fourteenth in the West regional and lost by nine points to Louisville in the first round in Sacramento. It was the twelfth consecutive year that the Big Sky representative lost in the first round, a streak that ended the following year.

This was Boise State's fourth NCAA Tournament appearance in Division I, the third under Dye, and their last as a member of the Big Sky Conference.

== Postseason results ==
| Date time, TV | Rank^{#} | Opponent^{#} | Result | Record | Site (attendance) city, state |
Big Sky tournament
| Thu, March 10; 9:00 pm | (5) | (4) Montana State; Quarterfinal | W 75–57 | 15–12 | BSU Pavilion (7,544); Boise, Idaho |
| Fri, March 11; 9:30 pm | (5) | (1) Weber State; Semifinal | W 84–72 | 16–12 | BSU Pavilion (8,445); Boise, Idaho |
| Sat, March 12; 7:37 pm, ESPN | (5) | (2) Idaho State; Final | W 85–81 | 17–12 | BSU Pavilion (9,166); Boise, Idaho |
NCAA tournament
| Fri, March 18*; 6:13 pm, CBS | (14W) | vs. (3W) No. 10 Louisville; First round | L 58–67 | 17–13 | ARCO Arena (16,477); Sacramento, California |
*Non-conference game. ^{#}Rankings from AP poll. (#) Tournament seedings in parentheses. All times are in Mountain time.
