= 1990 Big Sky Conference men's basketball tournament =

- Classification: Division I
- Season: 1989–90
- Teams: 6
- Site: BSU Pavilion; Boise, Idaho
- Champions: Idaho (4th title)
- Winning coach: Kermit Davis (2nd title)
- MVP: Riley Smith (Idaho)

1989–90 Big Sky men's basketball standings
	Conf.				Overall
Team	W		L	PCT	W		L	PCT
Idaho †	13	–	3	.813	25	–	6	.806
Eastern Washington	11	–	5	.688	18	–	11	.621
Montana	10	–	6	.625	18	–	11	.621
Nevada	9	–	7	.563	15	–	13	.536
Weber State	8	–	8	.500	14	–	15	.483
Montana State	8	–	8	.500	17	–	12	.586
Boise State	7	–	9	.438	12	–	15	.444
Northern Arizona	3	–	13	.188	8	–	20	.286
Idaho State	3	–	13	.188	6	–	21	.222
† Conference tournament winner

The 1990 Big Sky Conference men's basketball tournament was the fifteenth edition, held March 8–10 at the BSU Pavilion at Boise State University in Boise, Idaho.

Defending champion Idaho defeated Eastern Washington in the championship game, 65–62. It was the Vandals' second consecutive Big Sky tournament title, and fourth overall (1981, 1982, 1989, 1990).

== Format ==
Similar to the previous year, the tournament included the top six teams in the league standings. The top two earned byes into the semifinals while the remaining four played in the quarterfinals. The top seed met the lowest remaining seed in the semifinals.

== Bracket ==
Quarterfinals; Thursday, March 8
6	Montana State	69
3	Montana	57
4	Nevada	66
5	Weber State	75

Semifinals; Friday, March 9
1	Idaho	80
6	Montana State	71
5	Weber State	67
2	Eastern Washington	83

Championship; Saturday, March 10
1	Idaho	65
2	Eastern Washington	62

== NCAA tournament ==
The Vandals gained the automatic bid to the NCAA tournament, and no other Big Sky members were invited to the tournament or the NIT. Seeded thirteenth in the West Regional, Idaho lost to Louisville in Salt Lake City in the first round.

== See also ==
- Big Sky Conference women's basketball tournament
