= Orlando Lightfoot =

American basketball player

Personal information
- Born: December 4, 1972 (age 53) Chattanooga, Tennessee, U.S.
- Listed height: 6 ft 7 in (2.01 m)
- Listed weight: 224 lb (102 kg)

Career information
- High school: Chattanooga City (Chattanooga, Tennessee)
- College: Hiwassee (1989–1990); Idaho (1991–1994)
- NBA draft: 1994: undrafted
- Playing career: 1994–2007
- Position: Shooting guard
- Number: 14

Career history
- 1994: Olimpia de Venado Tuerto
- 1994–1995: Le Mans
- 1995–1996: Geneve
- 1996–1997: Houthalen
- 1997–1998: Versoix
- 1998–1999: Houthalen
- 1999–2001: Braunschweig
- 2001: Drac Inca Mallorca
- 2001–2002: Herzogtel Trier
- 2002–2003: Antranik Beirut
- 2003–2004: BSC Raiffeisen Furstenfeld
- 2004–2005: Myleasecar
- 2005: Polynom Giants Bergen Op Zoom
- 2005–2006: KFUM Jämtland Basket
- 2006: Avanti Mondorf
- 2006–2007: KFUM Jämtland Basket

Career highlights
- 2× Big Sky Player of the Year (1993, 1994); 3× First-team All-Big Sky (1992–1994); Third-team Parade All-American (1989)

Orlando Lightfoot (born December 4, 1974) is a retired American professional basketball player whose international career spanned from 1994 to 2007. He is best known in the United States for his collegiate career at the University of Idaho from 1991 and 1994 in which he was a two-time Big Sky Conference Player of the Year and graduated as the all-time leading scorer in conference history (2,102 points; record has since been broken). Since retiring from basketball he has become an account manager for a trucking company in his hometown of Chattanooga, Tennessee.

== Early life ==
Born in Chattanooga, Lightfoot played basketball at Chattanooga High School. He was named a Parade magazine All-American, was the 1989 Class AA Tennessee Mr. Basketball recipient and had signed a National Letter of Intent to play for the Oklahoma Sooners. Lightfoot's grades were so poor, however, that the NCAA's Proposition 48 did not allow him to enroll at the university. To improve his academic standing and to become eligible to play at a four-year Division I institution he enrolled at Hiwassee College, a junior college in Madisonville, Tennessee.

== College ==
=== Hiwassee ===
During Lightfoot's time at Hiwassee, his grades remained fairly poor. He played for the basketball team while enrolled, and even though he did not receive stellar marks in the classroom, they were good enough where he could play for a four-year school. After one year at the junior college, Lightfoot left. Due to NCAA rules, by leaving the two-year school early, he was forced to sit out on what would have been his true sophomore season but still afforded him the ability to retain three years of eligibility. During this one year off, he was determining which school to attend. Larry Eustachy, then-head coach of the Idaho Vandals men's basketball team, had approached Lightfoot during his freshman season at Hiwassee. One of Lightfoot's coaches at Hiwassee became an assistant to Eustachy at Idaho, and after encouragement from several of his junior college teammates who had visited that school and had loved it there, and thus he decided to play at Idaho.

=== Idaho ===
Lightfoot played for the Vandals for three seasons: 1991–92 through 1993–94. During his first year with the team, Idaho finished with an 18–14 (10–6 conference) record. He led the team in scoring with 21.8 points per game, and Sports Illustrated named him their national player of the week on February 17, 1992. To earn that honor, he had averaged 33.7 points, 10 rebounds and shot 54% from the field in wins over Southern Utah, Northern Arizona and Nevada. At the end of the season, Lightfoot was named to the All-Big Sky First Team as well as the recipient of its Newcomer of the Year Award.

As a junior in 1992–93 he once again led the Vandals in scoring with his 22.3 points per game average. He set the still-standing single season school record by scoring 715 points en route to leading Idaho to a regular season conference championship. They finished with a 24–8 overall (11–3 conference) record, but did not earn a berth into either the NCAA Tournament nor the National Invitation Tournament. On February 15, 1993, Sports Illustrated named him their national player of the week for a second time, almost exactly one year after his first national honor. He averaged 32.5 points and 16 rebounds in wins over Idaho State and Boise State. Against Boise State, Lightfoot scored a then-school record 44 points. The media recognized Lightfoot's outstanding season and named him the conference player of the year.

In Lightfoot's final season, the Vandals finished with an 18–10 (9–5 conference) record. For the third consecutive season he led the team in scoring, this time with a 25.4 points per game average. On December 21, he scored a still-standing school record 50 points against Gonzaga, including a career-high 8-for-11 shooting performance on three-point field goals. He had been in foul trouble early in the game and was forced to sit out for 10 minutes in the first half, so his 50 points came in only 30 minutes of playing time. In addition, his teammates only scored a combined 19 points, and the Vandals lost the game 76 to 69. Lightfoot then repeated as the conference player of the year, joining Montana's Larry Krystkowiak at the only two players to achieve the feat at least twice up until that point. Although the team achieved moderate success that season, they were not good enough to play in any postseason tournaments. Lightfoot's individual success during the year, and over the course of his career at the school, saw him graduate in 1994 as the most decorated player in the university's history and one of the Big Sky Conference's greatest players of all time.

In just a three-year career, Lightfoot scored 2,201 points, which stood as the Big Sky's highest total up until the 2017–18 season when it was broken by Eastern Washington's Bogdan Bliznyuk. In each year, he averaged 20+ points per game for a career average of 23.1 – nearly four points per game better than the next closest player at Idaho. He was a three-time first team all-conference selection, two-time conference player of the year, and currently holds 13 different records in the Vandals' record book. Among them are the top three single season scoring averages and four of the top six single game scoring marks. His career scoring record is also more than 500 points greater than the second closest player in school history.

While at Idaho, Lightfoot also excelled in the classroom, which was the opposite of what had been occurring at the high school and junior college levels. He did not miss a single class in his three years and graduated on time. Years later, he had this retrospective on the change: "I was not dumb, just lazy and spoiled. I was put on probation at Idaho and they would have kicked me out of there if I screwed up even once. Basketball was everything to me and it was my out, so I gave it all I had and buckled down in school."

== Professional ==
"When I first got over there it was a total culture shock. The biggest thing was to learn how to adapt to a foreign country with only two American players on each team. You do not know the language or understand the food, and it was hard to even find someone who spoke English. If you do not adapt, then they will send you home quickly."

— Lightfoot, on the adjustment to playing in other countries

Lightfoot did not get selected in the 1994 NBA draft. Rather than try out for a number of NBA teams in hopes of making a final roster, he decided right away to play professional basketball internationally. Between 1994–95 and 2006–07 he played for teams in Argentina, Austria, Belgium, France, Germany, Holland, Lebanon, Luxembourg, Spain, Sweden and Switzerland.

During his 12-year career he averaged at least 20 points per game in eight seasons and at least 18 per game in two others. His best statistical season came in 1995–96 while playing for Geneva in Switzerland. He averaged 27.5 points and 9.2 rebounds per game. His career highlights include:

- Belgian League All-Star Game (1999)
- German Bundesliga All-Imports 2nd Team (2000)
- German Bundesliga Cup Semifinals (2002)
- Dutch Eredivisie All-Star Game (2005)
- Eurobasket.com All-Dutch Eredivisie 2nd Team (2005)
- Dutch Eredivisie Semifinals (2005)
- Swedish Basketligan All-Star Game (2006)
  - Also won the Three-Point Competition

The final team of his career was KFUM Jämtland Basket in Sweden. He appeared in 15 games that year and averaged 19.0 points and 5.5 rebounds per game. Since his professional basketball retirement, Lightfoot has moved back to Chattanooga, Tennessee and become a trucking company's accounts manager. He has also become a father after his wife gave birth to their son. When asked how he would like people to remember his basketball career, he responded, "I want people to say that he played for the big game. When the game was on the line and everything mattered, he made all the big shots and led his team to a win."
