= 1989 Big Sky Conference men's basketball tournament =

- Classification: Division I
- Season: 1988–89
- Teams: 6
- Site: BSU Pavilion; Boise, Idaho
- Champions: Idaho (3rd title)
- Winning coach: Kermit Davis (1st title)
- MVP: Riley Smith (Idaho)

1988–89 Big Sky men's basketball standings
	Conf.				Overall
Team	W		L	PCT	W		L	PCT
Boise State	13	–	3	.813	23	–	7	.767
Idaho †	13	–	3	.813	25	–	6	.806
Montana	11	–	5	.688	20	–	11	.645
Nevada	10	–	6	.625	16	–	12	.571
Weber State	9	–	7	.563	17	–	11	.607
Montana State	6	–	10	.375	15	–	16	.484
Eastern Washington	5	–	11	.313	8	–	22	.267
Idaho State	4	–	12	.250	9	–	18	.333
Northern Arizona	1	–	15	.063	2	–	25	.074
† Conference tournament winner

The 1989 Big Sky Conference men's basketball tournament was held March 9–11 at the BSU Pavilion at Boise State University in Boise, Idaho.

Regular season co-champions Idaho and Boise State, defending tournament champions and host, met in the championship game. Both had 13–3 conference records with five overall losses, and had split their season series with home wins. Under first-year head coach Kermit Davis, Idaho prevailed, 59–52. It was the Vandals' third Big Sky tournament title; the wins in 1981 and 1982 were under head coach Don Monson.

Idaho was also the reigning conference champion in football.

== Format ==
The tournament format was modified again in 1989, with the field reduced from eight to six teams. The top two teams in the league standings received a bye, and the next four played in the quarterfinals.

== Bracket ==
Quarterfinals; Thursday, March 9
5	Weber State	69
4	Nevada	61
3	Montana	87
6	Montana State	84

Semifinals; Friday, March 10
1	Boise State	71
5	Weber State	60
3	Montana	56
2	Idaho	77

Championship; Saturday, March 11
1	Boise State	52
2	Idaho	59

== NCAA tournament ==
The Vandals received the automatic bid to the NCAA tournament, and were seeded thirteenth in the West Regional. They played UNLV in the first round in Boise and lost by twelve points. No other Big Sky members were invited to the tournament; Boise State lost in the first round of the NIT to Oklahoma State.
