= 1993 Big Sky Conference men's basketball tournament =

- Classification: Division I
- Season: 1992–93
- Teams: 6
- Site: Kibbie Dome; Moscow, Idaho
- Champions: Boise State (3rd title)
- Winning coach: Bobby Dye (2nd title)
- MVP: Tanoka Beard (Boise State)

1992–93 Big Sky men's basketball standings
	Conf.				Overall
Team	W		L	PCT	W		L	PCT
Idaho	11	–	3	.786	24	–	8	.750
Boise State †	10	–	4	.714	21	–	8	.724
Weber State	10	–	4	.714	20	–	8	.714
Montana	8	–	6	.571	17	–	11	.607
Idaho State	5	–	9	.357	10	–	18	.357
Montana State	5	–	9	.357	9	–	18	.333
Northern Arizona	4	–	10	.286	10	–	16	.385
Eastern Washington	3	–	11	.214	6	–	20	.231
† Conference tournament winner

The 1993 Big Sky Conference men's basketball tournament was the eighteenth edition, held March 11–13 at the Kibbie Dome at the University of Idaho in Moscow, Idaho.

Boise State defeated regular season champion and host Idaho in the final, 80–68, to clinch their third Big Sky tournament title (1976, 1988, 1993). The game was televised on ESPN, with a tipoff after 9 pm PST (midnight EST).

Fourth-seed Montana was attempting to win a third straight title, but was upset in the quarterfinals. It was the first Big Sky tournament in Moscow in eleven years.

== Format ==
Conference membership returned to eight this season; after thirteen years in the Big Sky, Nevada departed for the Big West the previous summer.

The tournament format was unchanged; the top six teams from the regular season were included and the regular season champion earned the right to host. The top two earned byes into the semifinals while the remaining four played in the quarterfinals; the top seed (host) met the lowest remaining seed in the semifinals.

== Bracket ==
Quarterfinals; Thursday, March 11
4	Montana	50
5	Idaho State	61
3	Weber State	91
6	Montana State	72

Semifinals; Friday, March 12
1	Idaho	91
5	Idaho State	87
2	Boise State	69
3	Weber State	63

Championship; Saturday, March 13
1	Idaho	68
2	Boise State	80

== NCAA tournament ==
The Broncos (21–7) received an automatic bid to the NCAA tournament; no other Big Sky members were invited to the tournament or the NIT. Boise State was seeded 14th in the West regional and lost by 20 points in the first round to Vanderbilt in Salt Lake City. This was the eleventh consecutive year in which the Big Sky representative lost in the first round.

== See also ==
- Big Sky Conference women's basketball tournament
