= Steve Barnes (basketball) =

American basketball coach (born 1957)

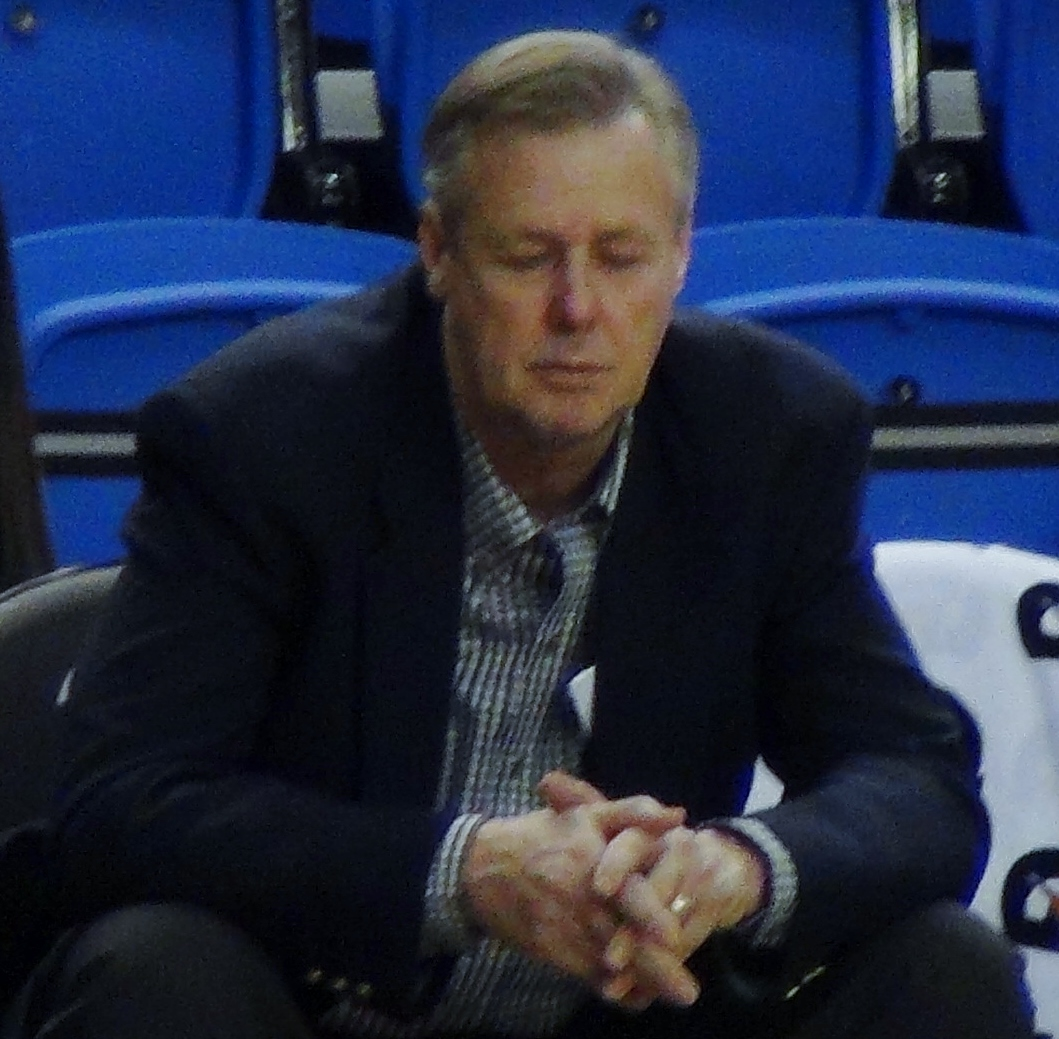
- Barnes in 2017

Biographical details
- Born: June 22, 1957 (age 69); Frankfurt, Germany

Playing career
- 1975–1977: Citrus
- 1977–1978: Chico State
- 1979–1980: Azusa Pacific

Coaching career (HC unless noted)
- 1978–1981: Arcadia HS (asst.)
- 1981–1983: Azusa Pacific (asst.)
- 1983–1984: Capistrano Valley Christian HS (asst.)
- 1984–1985: Capistrano Valley Christian HS
- 1985–1987: Saddleback (asst.)
- 1987–1988: Cal Poly (asst.)
- 1988–1993: Idaho (asst.)
- 1993–1994: Utah State (asst.)
- 1994–1996: Cal State Bakersfield (asst.)
- 1996–1998: Utah State (assoc. HC)
- 1998–1999: Iowa State (assoc. HC)
- 1999–2002: San Jose State
- 2002–2003: Iowa State (assoc. HC)
- 2004–2012: Southern Miss (assoc. HC)
- 2013–2018: Colorado State (assoc. HC)
- 2018: Colorado State (interim)

Administrative career (AD unless noted)
- 2012–2013: Colorado State (player personnel)

Head coaching record
- Overall: 39–51 (.433)

Steven Theodore Barnes (born June 22, 1957) is an American basketball coach who last served as the associate head coach at Colorado State University.

== Early life and education ==
Born in Frankfurt, Germany, Barnes grew up in North Carolina before moving to Arcadia, California and graduating from Arcadia High School in 1975. Barnes first played junior college basketball at Citrus College before transferring to Chico State in 1977. After playing his final year of eligibility at Azusa Pacific in the 1979–80 season, Barnes completed his bachelor's degree at Azusa Pacific in 1985 after several years of working as a coach.

== Coaching career ==
From 1978 to 1981, Barnes was an assistant coach at his Alma mater, Arcadia High School. Subsequently, he was an assistant coach at Azusa Pacific from 1981 to 1983, assistant coach at Capistrano Valley Christian School from 1983 to 1984, and head coach at that school from 1984 to 1985.

Barnes then was an assistant coach from 1985 to 1987 at Saddleback College, a junior college in Southern California. He then was an assistant at Cal Poly in the 1987–88 season.

In 1988, Barnes became an assistant coach at Idaho under Kermit Davis and helped Idaho make the NCAA Tournaments of 1989 and 1990. Barnes remained on staff when his former high school teammate Larry Eustachy became head coach in 1990 and started one of several stints as an assistant under Eustachy. Barnes then followed Eustachy to Utah State before joining Pat Douglass' staff at Cal State Bakersfield in 1994. Barnes recruited Kebu Stewart to Cal State Bakersfield, and Stewart became a first-team Division II All-American in 1996.

Reuniting with Eustachy, Barnes returned to Utah State after two seasons at Cal State Bakersfield, this time as associate head coach from 1996 to 1998. Barnes also served on Eustachy's inaugural staff at Iowa State as associate head coach in the 1998–99 season.

Barnes got his first college head coaching job at San Jose State on August 27, 1999. Barnes went 29–29 in his first two seasons, both of which had exact .500 records, including 14–14 in 2000–01. However, San Jose State dropped to 10–22 in 2001–02. On April 29, 2002, Barnes resigned from San Jose State to return to Iowa State as associate head coach.

On May 1, 2003, Iowa State suspended Barnes for alleged threats against administrators in response to a suspension of Eustachy. Iowa State fired Eustachy, and Barnes was not retained for the following season.

Eustachy returned to coaching at Southern Miss in 2004 and hired Barnes as associate head coach. Barnes helped Southern Miss make the 2012 NCAA Tournament.

In 2012, Barnes followed Eustachy to Colorado State and started as director of player personnel for a year before moving up to full-time assistant coach in 2013.

On February 3, 2018, Colorado State promoted Barnes to interim head coach after placing regular head coach Larry Eustachy on leave pending an investigation into Eustachy's behavior. Colorado State went 0–2 with Barnes as head coach, with a 76-67 loss to Nevada on February 3 and 78–73 loss to Air Force on February 6. On February 10, Colorado State placed Barnes on leave as well.

== Head coaching record ==
Record table
Season	Team	Overall	Conference	Standing	Postseason
San Jose State Spartans (Western Athletic Conference) (1999–2002)
1999–00	San Jose State	15–15	6–8	5th	
2000–01	San Jose State	14–14	6–10	7th	
2001–02	San Jose State	10–22	4–14	9th	
San Jose State:		39–51 (.433)	16–32 (.333)		
Colorado State Rams (Mountain West Conference) (2018)
2017–18	Colorado State	0–2	0–2		
Colorado State:		0–2 (.000)	0–2 (.000)		
Total:		39–53 (.424)			
