= Kermit Davis =

American basketball coach (born 1959)

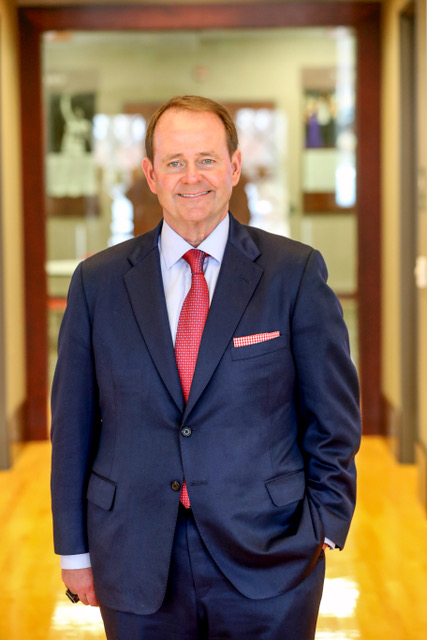

Biographical details
- Born: December 14, 1959 (age 66); Leakesville, Mississippi, U.S.

Playing career
- 1978–1980: Phillips County CC
- 1980–1982: Mississippi State
- Position: Guard

Coaching career (HC unless noted)
- 1983–1984: Mississippi State (assistant)
- 1984–1986: Southwest Mississippi CC
- 1986–1988: Idaho (assistant)
- 1988–1990: Idaho
- 1990–1991: Texas A&M
- 1991–1993: Chipola JC (assistant)
- 1993–1994: Chipola JC
- 1994–1996: Utah State (assistant)
- 1996–1997: Idaho
- 1997–2002: LSU (assistant)
- 2002–2018: Middle Tennessee
- 2018–2023: Ole Miss

Head coaching record
- Overall: 477–317 (.601)
- Tournaments: 2–6 (NCAA Division I); 3–3 (NIT); 0–2 (CIT)

Accomplishments and honors

Championships
- 3 C-USA regular season (2014, 2017, 2018); 2 C-USA tournament (2016, 2017); 2 Sun Belt regular season (2012, 2013); 2 Sun Belt East Division (2012, 2013); 2 Big Sky tournament (1989, 1990); 2 Big Sky regular season (1989, 1990)

Awards
- SEC Coach of the Year (2019); C-USA Coach of the Year (2017); Sun Belt Coach of the Year (2003); Big Sky Coach of the Year (1989)

Kermit John Davis Jr. (born December 14, 1959) is an American college basketball coach who was most recently the head coach for the Ole Miss Rebels from 2018 to 2023. Prior to that, he was the head coach at Middle Tennessee for 16 seasons. His head coaching experience also includes brief stops at Idaho (twice) and Texas A&M.

== Early life and family ==
Davis's father, Davis Sr., was the head coach at Mississippi State University for seven seasons, ending in 1977. Davis Sr. was an alumnus of the school and was promoted to head coach at age 34 after four years as an assistant for the Bulldogs. In his first season in 1971, Davis Sr. was named SEC Coach of the Year.

The younger Davis graduated from Starkville High School in 1978 and then played at Phillips County Community College in Arkansas for two years, and transferred to hometown Mississippi State, where he played two seasons and earned a bachelor's degree in 1982 and a master's in 1984 while a graduate assistant.

He and his wife, Betty, have two daughters, Ally and Claire.

== Coaching career ==
When promoted from assistant to head coach at Idaho in 1988 at age 28, Davis was the youngest head coach in NCAA Division I. He had been an assistant for two seasons with the Vandals under new and first-time head coach Tim Floyd, who left for New Orleans. Floyd had rejuvenated the program and under Davis, Idaho had consecutive 25–6 (.806) seasons, winning the Big Sky regular season and tournament titles to make the NCAA tournament both in 1989 and 1990. Davis left the Palouse for Texas A&M of the Southwest Conference in March 1990, but resigned a year later after an 8–21 (.276) first season in which he committed rules violations that landed A&M on two years probation and resulted in a two-year show-cause order against Davis himself. After three years at Chipola Junior College and two seasons as an assistant at Utah State, Davis returned to Idaho as head coach in March 1996, then left a year later to become associate head coach under John Brady at LSU.

Davis became head coach at Middle Tennessee in 2002. He led winning records in his first four seasons but first made a postseason tournament in 2010 at the CollegeInsider.com Tournament. Middle Tennessee followed that with appearances in the 2012 NIT and 2013 NCAA tournament. Middle Tennessee moved from the Sun Belt Conference to Conference USA for the 2013–14 season. Following an appearance in the 2015 CollegeInsider.com Tournament, Middle Tennessee made the 2016 NCAA tournament by way of winning the C-USA tournament. In the first round of the NCAA Tournament as a #15 seed, Middle Tennessee upset #2 seed (and AP-ranked #2) Michigan State 90–81. Middle Tennessee then lost the second-round game to #10 seed Syracuse 75–50. The following season Middle Tennessee made it to the second round a second consecutive year by upsetting #5 seed Minnesota, but again losing in the second round, this time to #4 seed (and AP-ranked #21) Butler.

At the conclusion of the 2017–18 season, Davis was named the head coach at Ole Miss. Davis led the Rebels to the NCAA Tournament in his first season, where they lost to Oklahoma in the first round.

On February 24, 2023, the University of Mississippi had announced that it and Davis had "mutually agreed to part ways".

== Head coaching record ==
Record table
Season	Team	Overall	Conference	Standing	Postseason
Idaho Vandals (Big Sky Conference) (1988–1990)
1988–89	Idaho	25–6	13–3	1st	NCAA Division I Round of 64
1989–90	Idaho	25–6	13–3	1st	NCAA Division I Round of 64
Idaho (first):		50–12 (.806)	26–6 (.813)		
Texas A&M Aggies (Southwest Conference) (1990–1991)
1990–91	Texas A&M	8–21	2–14	9th	
Texas A&M:		8–21 (.276)	2–14 (.125)		
Idaho Vandals (Big West Conference) (1996–1997)
1996–97	Idaho	13–17	5–11	5th (East)	
Idaho (second):		13–17 (.433)	5–11 (.313)		
Idaho (total):		63–29 (.685)	31–17 (.646)		
Middle Tennessee Blue Raiders (Sun Belt Conference) (2002–2013)
2002–03	Middle Tennessee	16–14	9–5	2nd (East)	
2003–04	Middle Tennessee	17–12	8–6	3rd (East)	
2004–05	Middle Tennessee	19–12	7–7	3rd (East)	
2005–06	Middle Tennessee	16–12	8–6	2nd (East)	
2006–07	Middle Tennessee	15–17	8–10	5th (East)	
2007–08	Middle Tennessee	17–15	11–7	3rd (East)	
2008–09	Middle Tennessee	18–14	10–8	3rd (East)	
2009–10	Middle Tennessee	19–14	13–5	2nd (East)	CIT First Round
2010–11	Middle Tennessee	16–16	10–6	2nd (East)	
2011–12	Middle Tennessee	27–7	14–2	1st (East)	NIT Quarterfinals
2012–13	Middle Tennessee	28–6	19–1	1st (East)	NCAA Division I First Four
Middle Tennessee Blue Raiders (Conference USA) (2013–2018)
2013–14	Middle Tennessee	24–9	13–3	T–1st	
2014–15	Middle Tennessee	19–17	9–9	6th	CIT First Round
2015–16	Middle Tennessee	25–10	13–5	2nd	NCAA Division I Round of 32
2016–17	Middle Tennessee	31–5	17–1	1st	NCAA Division I Round of 32
2017–18	Middle Tennessee	25–8	16–2	1st	NIT Second Round
Middle Tennessee:		332–188 (.638)	185–83 (.690)		
Ole Miss Rebels (Southeastern Conference) (2018–2023)
2018–19	Ole Miss	20–13	10–8	T–6th	NCAA Division I Round of 64
2019–20	Ole Miss	15–17	6–12	12th	
2020–21	Ole Miss	16–12	10–8	6th	NIT First Round
2021–22	Ole Miss	13–19	4–14	13th	
2022–23 (Note: Ole Miss parted ways with Davis with three games remaining in the regular season.)	Ole Miss	10–18	2–13	13th	
Ole Miss:		74–79 (.484)	32–55 (.368)		
Total:		477–317 (.601)			
National champion Postseason invitational champion Conference regular season champion Conference regular season and conference tournament champion Division regular season champion Division regular season and conference tournament champion Conference tournament champion
