= ExtraMile Arena =

Indoor arena at Boise State University

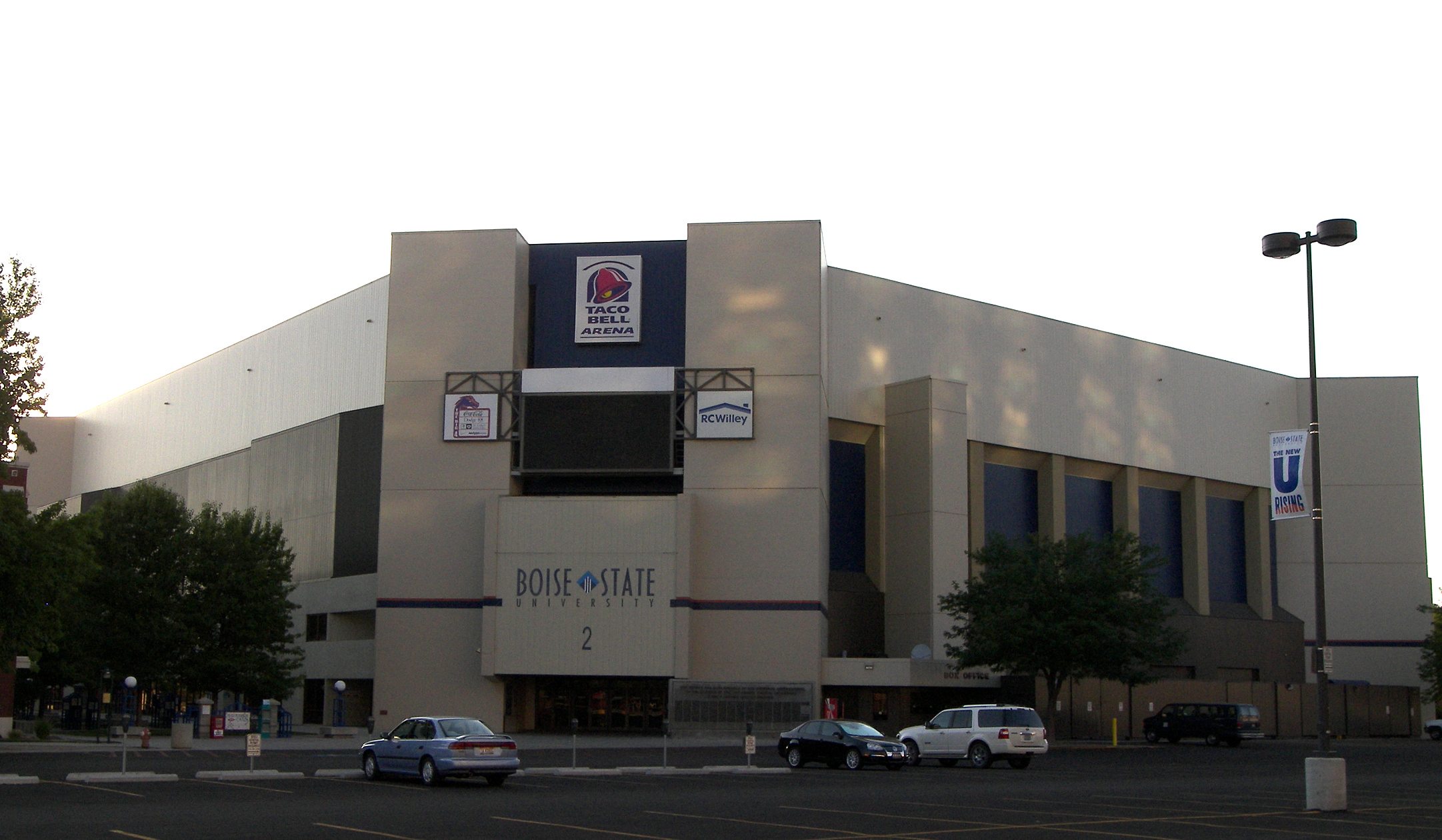
- View from southeast in 2009

- Location in the United States Location in Idaho
- Interactive map of ExtraMile Arena
- Former names: BSU Pavilion (1982–2004); Taco Bell Arena (2004–19)
- Address: 1401 Bronco Lane
- Location: Boise State University; Boise, Idaho, U.S.
- Coordinates: 43.6035°N 116.199°W
- Elevation: 2,700 feet (825 m) AMSL
- Owner: Boise State University
- Capacity: 12,644 (basketball) Detailed capacity: Center stage: 13,390; Half-house: 6,795; Theatre: 4,292

Construction
- Groundbreaking: February 1980
- Opened: May 16, 1982; 44 years ago
- Cost: $17.5 million ($68.4 million in 2025)
- Architect: CSHQA

Tenant
- Boise State Broncos (NCAA) (1982–present)

Website
- Venue Website

ExtraMile Arena (formerly BSU Pavilion and Taco Bell Arena) is a multi-purpose indoor arena in the western United States, on the campus of Boise State University in Boise, Idaho. It is located on the east end of campus, between West Campus Lane and César Chávez Circle, immediately northwest of Albertsons Stadium.

Home to the Broncos basketball and gymnastics teams, its current seating capacity is 12,644 for basketball. The elevation of its floor is approximately 2,700 feet (825 m) above sea level.

The venue is also used for concerts (capacity 13,390), community events, and trade shows (17,000 square feet (1,580 m^{2}) of arena floor space plus 10,000 sq ft (930 m^{2}) in the auxiliary gym). It hosted a Davis Cup tennis match in April 2013, a second-round tie between the U.S. and Serbia.

== Bronco Gym ==
The arena's predecessor on campus was Bronco Gymnasium, which opened in the mid-1950s, during the junior college era. Its last varsity basketball game was the regular season finale in 1982 on February 27, against rival Idaho, ranked ninth in the AP poll. Sold out two weeks in advance, the Saturday night game had a record attendance of 3,946; the capacity of the gym at the time was listed at 3,682.

== History ==
Long in the planning stages, the architects were Cline, Smull, Hamill and Associates of Boise, selected in October 1978. Ground was broken for the arena on February 19, 1980, directly north of the Bronco Gym. Construction displaced the tennis courts and the right field area of the baseball field, currently the site of the auxiliary gym on the west side of the arena.

Eight tennis courts were rebuilt on the former baseball infield, west of the arena. The baseball field was not rebuilt as BSU dropped baseball as a varsity sport following the 1980 season. During their final season, the Broncos played home games at Borah Field (now Wigle Field) at Borah High School, four miles (6 km) west of campus.

The arena opened 44 years ago in 1982 as the BSU Pavilion; its first event was commencement on May 16, followed by graduation ceremonies for the city's three public high schools. That August, it hosted an eight-day Billy Graham Crusade, and its first significant sporting event was the NCAA basketball tournament in March 1983.

In April 2017, Boise State ended their wrestling program, which had been using the arena as its home venue.

=== Naming rights ===
The BSU Pavilion received its first naming rights sponsorship in June 2004 with Taco Bell, a fast-food restaurant chain based in Irvine, California; the 15-year agreement with the university was for $4 million and the venue was renamed Taco Bell Arena. At its expiration in 2019, Boise State entered into a new agreement with ExtraMile, a convenience store chain jointly owned by Chevron and Jacksons; the 15-year agreement was for $8.4 million and it became ExtraMile Arena.

== Basketball tournaments ==
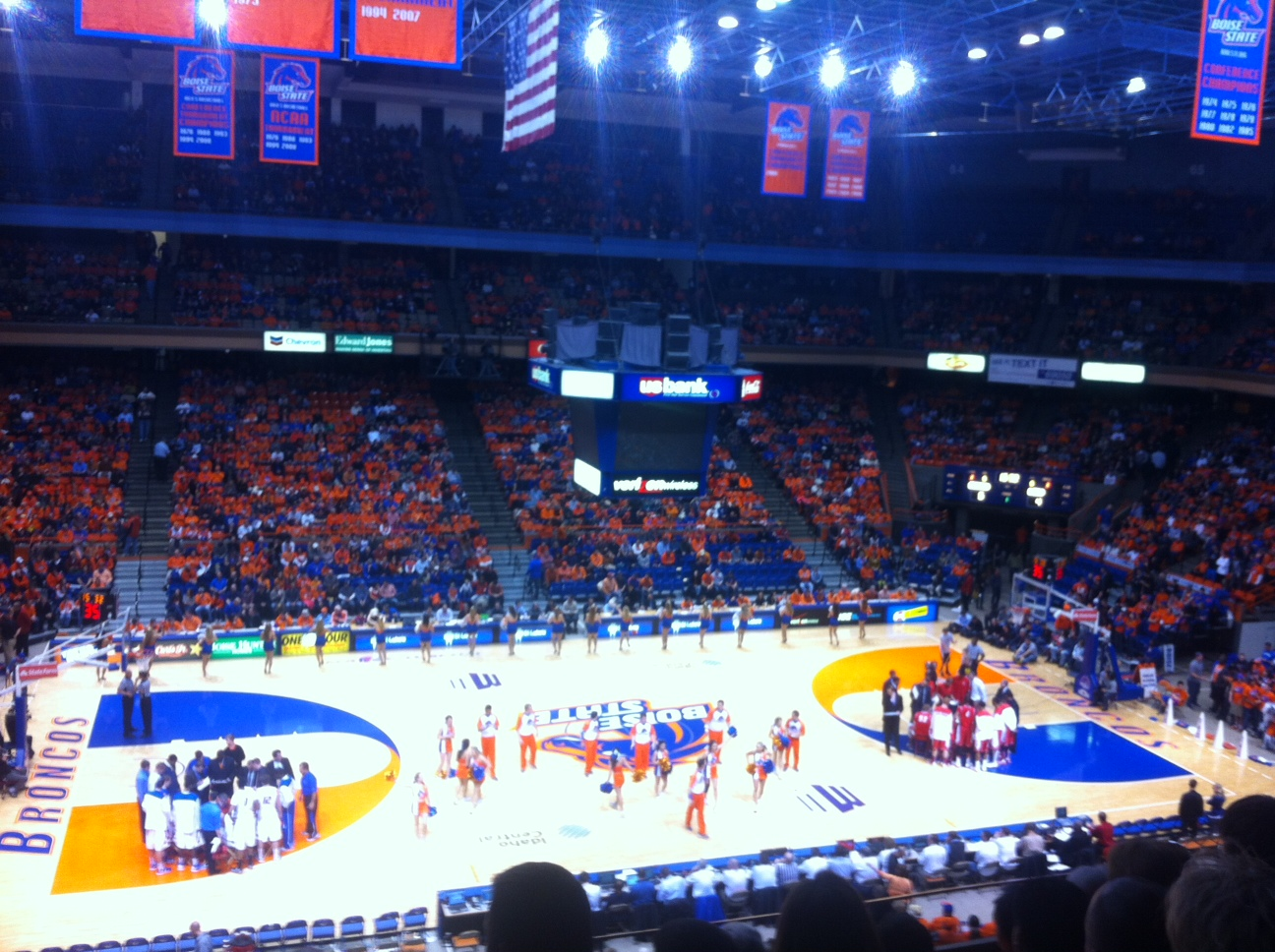
Broncos vs. New Mexico in January 2013

While the Broncos were members, the venue hosted four Big Sky Conference men's basketball tournaments: 1985, 1989, 1990, and 1994. In those four tourneys, BSU made the finals in 1989 and won the title in 1994.

ExtraMile Arena has been a familiar site for early-round NCAA tournament games, hosting first and second round competition nine times (1983, 1989, 1992, 1995, 1998, 2001, 2005, 2009, and 2018). It had been scheduled to return in 2021, but the COVID-19 pandemic resulted in the entire tournament getting moved to Indiana.

In 1995, UCLA guard Tyus Edney dashed the length of the 94-foot (29 m) court in just over four seconds to make a layup that gave the Bruins a 75–74 win over Missouri, which sustained UCLA's run to the national title.

In 2001, it was the site of the closest first-round day at a single host location, with the four games on March 15 decided by a combined total of seven points. One was Hampton's 58–57 upset of #2 seed Iowa State — only the fourth #15 seed to advance since the tournament expanded from 53 to 64 teams in 1985.

== See also ==
- List of NCAA Division I basketball arenas
