= Montana State Bobcats men's basketball statistical leaders =

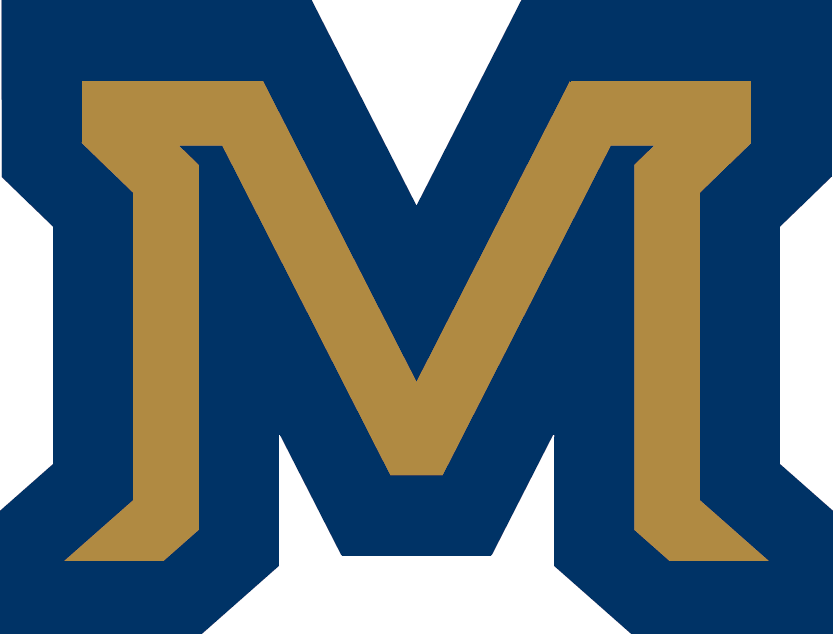

The Montana State Bobcats men's basketball statistical leaders are individual statistical leaders of the Montana State Bobcats men's basketball program in various categories, including points, assists, blocks, rebounds, and steals. Within those areas, the lists identify single-game, single-season, and career leaders. The Bobcats represent the Montana State University in the NCAA's Big Sky Conference.

Montana State began competing in intercollegiate basketball in 1907. However, the school's record book does not generally list records from before the 1950s, as records from before this period are often incomplete and inconsistent. Since scoring was much lower in this era, and teams played much fewer games during a typical season, it is likely that few or no players from this era would appear on these lists anyway.

The NCAA did not officially record assists as a stat until the 1983–84 season, and blocks and steals until the 1985–86 season, but Montana State's record books includes players in these stats before these seasons. These lists are updated through the end of the 2020–21 season.

== Scoring ==
Career
Rk	Player	Points	Seasons
1	Tyler Hall	2,518	2015–16 2016–17 2017–18 2018–19
2	Larry Chanay	2,034	1956–57 1957–58 1958–59 1959–60
3	Harald Frey	1,890	2016–17 2017–18 2018–19 2019–20
4	Nate Holmstadt	1,864	1995–96 1996–97 1997–98 1998–99
5	Tom Domako	1,841	1984–85 1985–86 1986–87 1987–88
6	Jubrile Belo	1,609	2019–20 2020–21 2021–22 2022–23
7	Jack Gillespie	1,543	1966–67 1967–68 1968–69
8	Cat Thompson	1,539	1926–27 1927–28 1928–29 1929–30
9	Danny Sprinkle	1,497	1995–96 1996–97 1997–98 1998–99
10	Craig Finberg	1,473	1975–76 1976–77 1977–78 1978–79

Season
Rk	Player	Points	Season
1	Tyler Hall	739	2016–17
2	Tom Domako	667	1987–88
3	Tyler Hall	657	2018–19
4	Cat Thompson	629	1927–28
5	RaeQuan Battle	619	2022–23
6	Nate Holmstadt	602	1998–99
7	Cat Thompson	597	1928–29
8	Larry Chanay	592	1959–60
9	Tom Domako	589	1986–87
10	Craig Finberg	579	1977–78

Single game
Rk	Player	Points	Season	Opponent
1	Tom Storm	44	1966–67	Portland State
2	Tyler Hall	42	2016–17	Milwaukee
	Greg Harris	42	1967–68	Portland State
4	Don Rae	41	1963–64	Montana
5	Kirk Rocheleau	40	1973–74	Gonzaga
	Jack Gillespie	40	1967–68	Montana
	Larry Chanay	40	1958–59	Whitworth
	Orland Ward	40	1928–29	Livingston Railway
9	Tom Domako	39	1986–87	Weber State
10	Bill Brickhouse	38	1970–71	Idaho State
	Willie Weeks	38	1970–71	Idaho State
	Boyd DeTonancour	38	1944–45	Carroll

== Rebounds ==
Career
Rk	Player	Rebounds	Seasons
1	Jack Gillespie	1,011	1966–67 1967–68 1968–69
2	Doug Hashley	890	1978–79 1979–80 1980–81 1981–82
3	Nate Holmstadt	785	1995–96 1996–97 1997–98 1998–99
4	Jubrile Belo	770	2019–20 2020–21 2021–22 2022–23
5	Kermit Young	752	1962–63 1963–64 1964–65
6	Dwayne Michaels	711	1991–92 1992–93 1993–94 1994–95
7	John Bryant	709	1959–60 1960–61 1961–62
8	Larry Chanay	704	1956–57 1957–58 1958–59 1959–60
9	Mark Beckwith	679	1970–71 1971–72 1972–73
10	Tryg Johnson	668	1981–82 1982–83 1983–84 1984–85

Season
Rk	Player	Rebounds	Season
1	Jack Gillespie	383	1968–69
2	Jack Gillespie	344	1967–68
3	Quadre Lollis	340	1995–96
4	Doug Hashley	313	1981–82
5	Ted Carter	309	1954–55
6	Mark Beckwith	291	1972–73
7	Jack Gillespie	284	1966–67
8	Larry Chanay	272	1957–58
	Bill Salonen	272	1954–55
10	Damon Ollie	268	1997–98

Single game
Rk	Player	Rebounds	Season	Opponent
1	Doug Hashley	24	1981–82	Nevada
2	Jack Gillespie	23	1967–68	Idaho
3	Doug Hashley	21	1981–82	Nevada
4	Tom Domako	19	1986–87	Indiana
5	Quadre Lollis	18	1995–96	Weber State
	Art Menefee	18	1991–92	Eastern Washington
7	Quadre Lollis	17	1995–96	Southern Utah
	Quadre Lollis	17	1995–96	Idaho
	Tom Domako	17	1986–87	Indiana
10	Jubrile Belo	16	2021–22	Montana
	Quadre Lollis	16	1995–96	Idaho State
	Quadre Lollis	16	1995–96	Weber State
	Tryg Johnson	16	1983–84	UW Superior
	Doug Hashley	16	1980–81	Nevada
	Doug Hashley	16	1980–81	St. Cloud State
	Doug Hashley	16	1980–81	Northern Iowa

== Assists ==
Career
Rk	Player	Assists	Seasons
1	Scott Hatler	608	1992–93 1993–94 1994–95 1995–96
2	Harald Frey	514	2016–17 2017–18 2018–19 2019–20
3	Marcus Colbert	453	2012–13 2013–14 2014–15 2015–16
4	Craig Finberg	428	1975–76 1976–77 1977–78 1978–79
5	Tony Hampton	382	1983–84 1984–85 1985–86
6	Mick Durham	362	1975–76 1976–77 1978–79 1979–80
7	Jeff Epperly	350	1981–82 1982–83 1983–84 1984–85
8	Tom Domako	345	1984–85 1985–86 1986–87 1987–88
9	Casey Durham	337	2004–05 2005–06 2006–07 2007–08
10	Tyler Hall	316	2015–16 2016–17 2017–18 2018–19

Season
Rk	Player	Assists	Season
1	Chris Conway	194	1987–88
2	Scott Hatler	177	1995–96
3	Scott Hatler	167	1992–93
	Darius Brown II	167	2022–23
5	Harald Frey	159	2018–19
	Johnny Perkins	159	1991–92
7	Marcus Colbert	158	2015–16
8	Tony Hampton	157	1985–86
9	Scott Hatler	156	1994–95
10	Shann Ferch	150	1986–87

Single game
Rk	Player	Assists	Season	Opponent
1	Darius Brown II	16	2022–23	Middle Tennessee
	Craig Finberg	16	1977–78	St. Joe's
	Paul Kinne	16	1976–77	Portland State
4	Johnny Perkins	15	1991–92	Northern Arizona
5	Scott Hatler	13	1992–93	Texas Tech
	Tony Hampton	13	1985–86	Montana
7	Darius Brown II	12	2022–23	Northern Colorado
	Scott Hatler	12	1995–96	Weber State
	Mike Elliott	12	1994–95	Chadron State
	Scott Hatler	12	1992–93	Weber State
	Brian Elve	12	1989–90	Southern Utah
	Chris Conway	12	1987–88	Northern Arizona
	Scott McDonald	12	1973–74	Central Michigan
	Brian Elve	12	1989–90	Southern Utah

== Steals ==
Career
Rk	Player	Steals	Seasons
1	Jason Erickson	162	2000–01 2001–02 2002–03 2003–04
2	Ray Willis, Jr.	159	1984–85 1985–86 1986–87 1987–88
3	Kwesi Coleman	155	1991–92 1992–93 1993–94 1994–95
4	Casey Durham	145	2004–05 2005–06 2006–07 2007–08
5	Chris Conway	137	1986–87 1987–88
6	Harald Frey	136	2016–17 2017–18 2018–19 2019–20
7	Robert Ford III	133	2022–23 2023–24
8	Jeff Epperly	132	1981–82 1982–83 1983–84 1984–85
9	Aaron Rich	126	1998–99 1999–00 2000–01 2001–02
10	Tyler Hall	122	2015–16 2016–17 2017–18 2018–19

Season
Rk	Player	Steals	Season
1	Robert Ford III	100	2023–24
2	Chris Conway	94	1987–88
3	Ray Willis, Jr.	76	1987–88
4	Johnny Perkins	67	1990–91
5	Jason Erickson	64	2003–04
6	Darius Brown II	60	2022–23
	Eddie Turner III	60	2023–24
8	Will Bynum	59	2008–09
9	Kwesi Coleman	55	1994–95
	Johnny Maclin	55	1981–82

Single game
Rk	Player	Steals	Season	Opponent
1	Chris Conway	8	1987–88	Louisiana Tech
2	Eddie Turner III	7	2023–24	Idaho
	Robert Ford	7	2023–24	Green Bay
	Antonio Biglow	7	2012–13	Northern Arizona
	Will Bynum	7	2008–09	Portland State
	Kwesi Coleman	7	1991–92	Southern Utah
	Alonzo Stephens	7	1989–90	Northern Arizona

== Blocks ==
Career
Rk	Player	Blocks	Seasons
1	Jubrile Belo	160	2019–20 2020–21 2021–22 2022–23
2	Dwayne Michaels	149	1991–92 1992–93 1993–94 1994–95
3	Tryg Johnson	113	1981–82 1982–83 1983–84 1984–85
4	Al Beye	105	2004–05 2005–06
5	Mike Fellows	97	1985–86 1986–87 1987–88 1988–89
6	Bill Krieger	96	1978–79 1979–80 1980–81
7	Divaldo Mbunga	93	2007–08 2008–09
8	Nate Holmstadt	83	1995–96 1996–97 1997–98 1998–99
9	Eric Norman	76	2012–13 2013–14 2014–15
10	Aaron Rich	63	1998–99 1999–00 2000–01 2001–02

Season
Rk	Player	Blocks	Season
1	Al Beye	62	2005–06
2	Dwayne Michaels	60	1994–95
	Jubrile Belo	60	2021–22
4	Divaldo Mbunga	57	2008–09
5	Eric Norman	50	2014–15
6	Bill Krieger	49	1980–81
7	Bill Krieger	47	1979–80
8	Al Beye	43	2004–05
9	Tom Duffy	42	2000–01
	Dwayne Michaels	42	1993–94

Single game
Rk	Player	Blocks	Season	Opponent
1	Jubrile Belo	8	2020–21	Southern Utah
2	Divaldo Mbunga	7	2008–09	Sacramento state
	Divaldo Mbunga	7	2008–09	CSU Fullerton
	Dwayne Michaels	7	1994–95	Weber State
5	Eric Norman	6	2014–15	Montana
	Eric Norman	6	2014–15	UT Arlington
	Adrian Zamora	6	2006–07	Portland State
	Al Beye	6	2005–06	Portland State
	Al Beye	6	2004–05	Idaho State
	Dewey Michaels	6	1994–95	Montana
	Tryg Johnson	6	1984–85	Boise State
