= List of Montana State Bobcats men's basketball head coaches =

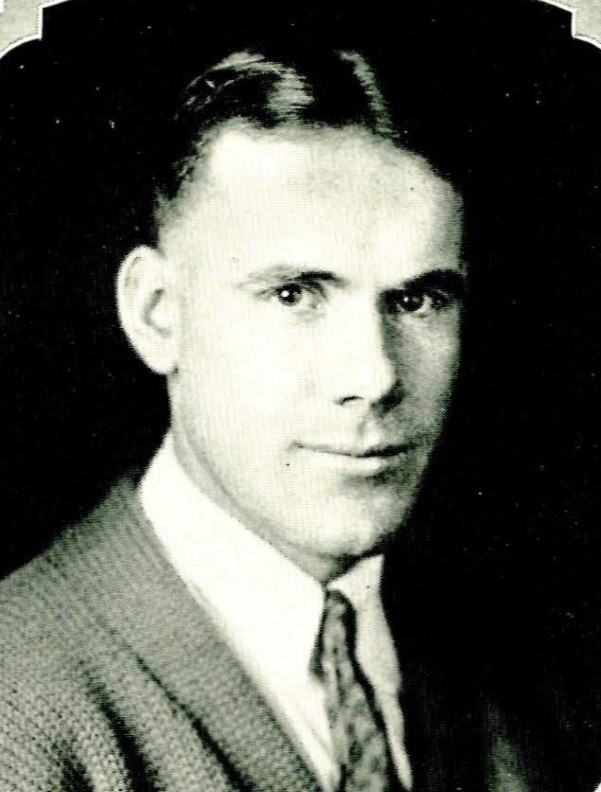
Brick Breeden, the winningest head coach in Bobcats men's basketball history.

The following is a list of Montana State Bobcats men's basketball head coaches. There have been 23 head coaches of the Bobcats in their 121-season history.

Montana State's current head coach is Matt Logie. He was hired as the Bobcats' head coach in April 2019, replacing Danny Sprinkle, Utah State current head coach the 2023–24 season.

No.	Tenure	Coach	Years	Record	Pct.
–	1901–1907	Team captains	6	24–10	.706
1	1907–1908	Walter R. Knox	1	8–1	.889
2	1908–1911	John H. McIntosh	3	19–5	.792
3	1911–1913	Earnest A. Dockstader	2	13–7	.650
4	1913–1914	Joe Markham	1	10–5	.667
5	1914–1919	Fred Bennion	5	37–15	.712
6	1919–1920	Walter D. Powell	1	13–0	1.000
7	1920–1922	D. V. Graves	2	19–13	.594
8	1922–1928	G. Ott Romney	6	145–30	.829
9	1928–1935	Schubert R. Dyche	7	110–92	.545
10	1935–1947 (Note: Montana State did not field a team for the 1943–44 season.); 1948–1954	Brick Breeden	17	283–198	.588
11	1947–1948	Max Worthington	1	18–9	.667
12	1954–1955	Wally Lemm	1	11–16	.407
13	1955–1962	Dobbie Lambert	7	88–90	.494
14	1962–1969	Roger Craft	7	92–83	.526
15	1969–1972	Gary Hulst	3	26–51	.338
16	1972–1974	Hank Anderson	2	28–24	.538
17	1974–1978	Rich Juarez	4	41–62	.398
18	1978–1983	Bruce Haroldson	5	66–69	.489
19	1983–1990	Stu Starner	7	110–95	.537
20	1990–2006 (Note: Montana State vacated 15 wins from the 1993–94 season. Durham's on-court record is 246–213 (.536).)	Mick Durham	16	231–213	.520
21	2006–2014	Brad Huse	8	106–137	.436
22	2014–2019	Brian Fish	5	65–92	.414
23	2019–2023	Danny Sprinkle	4	81–43	.653
24	2023–present	Matt Logie	1	0–0	–
Totals		23 coaches	121 seasons	1,644–1,360	.547
Records updated through end of 2022–23 season Source
