= 1995–96 Idaho Vandals men's basketball team =

American college basketball season

1995–96 Idaho Vandals men's basketball
- Conference: Big Sky Conference
- Record: 12–16 (5–9 Big Sky)
- Head coach: Joe Cravens (3rd season)
- Assistant coaches: Ray Jones; Jay McMillin; Bus Connor
- Home arena: Kibbie Dome

1995–96 Big Sky men's basketball standings
	Conf.				Overall
Team	W		L	PCT	W		L	PCT
Montana State †	11	–	3	.786	21	–	9	.700
Weber State	10	–	4	.714	20	–	10	.667
Montana	10	–	4	.714	20	–	8	.714
Boise State	10	–	4	.714	15	–	13	.536
Idaho State	7	–	7	.500	11	–	15	.423
Idaho	5	–	9	.357	12	–	16	.429
Northern Arizona	3	–	11	.214	6	–	20	.231
Eastern Washington	0	–	14	.000	3	–	23	.115
† 1996 Big Sky tournament winner

The 1995–96 Idaho Vandals men's basketball team represented the University of Idaho during the 1995–96 NCAA Division I men's basketball season. Members of the Big Sky Conference, the Vandals were led by third-year head coach Joe Cravens and played their home games on campus at the Kibbie Dome in Moscow, Idaho.

The Vandals were 11–15 overall in the regular season and 5–9 in conference play, sixth in the league standings.

At the conference tournament in Bozeman, Montana, the Vandals defeated third-seed Montana in the opening round, but lost by 25 points in the semifinals to top-seed and host Montana State, the eventual champion, and ended at 12–16 (.429).

Idaho incurred consecutive losing seasons for the first time in a decade, when they had three straight cellar finishes under Bill Trumbo. A few days later, Cravens was fired by athletic director Pete Liske, and was succeeded by former head coach Kermit Davis.

After this season, Idaho (and Boise State) departed for the Big West Conference; Vandal basketball later returned to the Big Sky, beginning with the 2014–15 season.

== Postseason results ==
Date time, TV	Rank^{#}	Opponent^{#}	Result	Record	Site (attendance) city, state
Big Sky tournament
Thu, March 7; 5:07 pm	(6)	vs. (3) Montana; Quarterfinal	W 72–67	12–15	Brick Breeden Fieldhouse (5,827); Bozeman, Montana
Thu, March 8; 8:20 pm	(6)	at (1) Montana State; Semifinal	L 66–91	12–16	Brick Breeden Fieldhouse (7,357); Bozeman, Montana
*Non-conference game. (#) Tournament seedings in parentheses. All times are in Pacific time.
