= 1985–86 Montana State Bobcats men's basketball team =

American college basketball season

1985–86 Montana State Bobcats men's basketball

Big Sky tournament champions

NCAA tournament, First round
- Conference: Big Sky Conference
- Record: 14–17 (6–8 Big Sky)
- Head coach: Stu Starner (3rd season)
- Assistant coach: Mick Durham (4th season)
- Home arena: Brick Breeden Fieldhouse

1985–86 Big Sky Conference men's basketball standings
	Conf.				Overall
Team	W		L	PCT	W		L	PCT
Northern Arizona	9	–	5	.643	19	–	10	.655
Montana	9	–	5	.643	21	–	11	.656
Idaho State	8	–	6	.571	15	–	12	.556
Weber State	7	–	7	.500	18	–	11	.621
Nevada	7	–	7	.500	13	–	15	.464
Montana State †	6	–	8	.429	14	–	17	.452
Boise State	6	–	8	.429	12	–	16	.429
Idaho	4	–	10	.286	11	–	18	.379
† 1986 Big Sky tournament winner

The 1985–86 Montana State Bobcats men's basketball team represented Montana State University as a member of the Big Sky Conference during the 1985–86 NCAA Division I men's basketball season. Led by head coach Stu Starner, the Bobcats finished in 6th place after the Big Sky regular season. The team rallied and made a run to win the Big Sky tournament and earn an automatic bid to the NCAA tournament. Playing as No. 16 seed in the West region, Montana State pushed No. 1 seed St. John's before falling, 83–74, in the opening round.

== Roster ==
1985–86 Montana State Bobcats men's basketball team
Players
Coaches

Pos.	#	Name	Height	Weight	Year	Hometown
G		Tony Hampton	5 ft 11 in (1.8 m)	—	Jr
F		Kral Ferch	6 ft 3 in (1.91 m)	—	Jr
F	35	Tom Domako	6 ft 9 in (2.06 m)	210 lb (95 kg)	So	Detroit, Michigan

Head coach

- Stu Starner

Assistant coach(es)

- Mick Durham

Legend

- (C) Team captain
- (S) Suspended
- (I) Ineligible
- (W) Walk-on
- Injured
- Current redshirt

== Schedule and results ==
Date time, TV	Rank^{#}	Opponent^{#}	Result	Record	Site city, state
Regular season
Nov 22, 1985*		at No. 14 LSU	L 59–84	0–1	LSU Assembly Center; Baton Rouge, Louisiana
Nov 25, 1985*		at Houston Baptist	L 72–74	0–2	Sharp Gymnasium; Houston, Texas
Dec 2, 1985*		Pacific	W 82–72	1–2	Worthington Arena; Havre, Montana
Dec 7, 1985*		California	L 62–69	1–3	Worthington Arena; Havre, Montana
Dec 14, 1985*		Nebraska	L 59–76	1–4	Worthington Arena; Havre, Montana
Mar 1, 1986		Montana	W 88–76	11–16 (6–8)	Worthington Arena; Havre, Montana
Big Sky tournament
Mar 7, 1986*	(6)	at (3) Nevada; Quarterfinals	W 81–80	12–16	Lawlor Events Center; Reno, Nevada
Mar 8, 1986*	(6)	vs. (1) Northern Arizona; Semifinals	W 80–74	13–16	Lawlor Events Center; Reno, Nevada
Mar 9, 1986*	(6)	vs. (2) Montana; Championship	W 82–77	14–16	Lawlor Events Center; Reno, Nevada
NCAA Tournament
Mar 14, 1986*	(16 W)	vs. (1 W) No. 4 St. John's; First Round	L 74–83	14–17	Long Beach Arena; Long Beach, California
*Non-conference game. ^{#}Rankings from AP Poll. (#) Tournament seedings in parentheses. W=West.
