= 1995–96 Montana State Bobcats men's basketball team =

American college basketball season

1995–96 Montana State Bobcats men's basketball

Big Sky Regular season champions Big Sky tournament champions

NCAA tournament
- Conference: Big Sky Conference
- Record: 21–9 (11–3 Big Sky)
- Head coach: Mick Durham (6th season)
- Home arena: Brick Breeden Fieldhouse

1995–96 Big Sky men's basketball standings
	Conf.				Overall
Team	W		L	PCT	W		L	PCT
Montana State †	11	–	3	.786	21	–	9	.700
Weber State	10	–	4	.714	20	–	10	.667
Montana	10	–	4	.714	20	–	8	.714
Boise State	10	–	4	.714	15	–	13	.536
Idaho State	7	–	7	.500	11	–	15	.423
Idaho	5	–	9	.357	12	–	16	.429
Northern Arizona	3	–	11	.214	6	–	20	.231
Eastern Washington	0	–	14	.000	3	–	23	.115
† 1996 Big Sky tournament winner

The 1995–96 Montana State Bobcats men's basketball team represented Montana State University as a member of the Big Sky Conference during the 1995–96 NCAA Division I men's basketball season. Led by head coach Mick Durham, the Bobcats finished in 1st place in the Big Sky regular season standings. The team won the Big Sky tournament and earn an automatic bid to the NCAA tournament. Playing as No. 13 seed in the West region, Montana State was handled by No. 4 seed and eventual National runner-up Syracuse, 88–55, in the opening round.

== Roster ==
1995–96 Montana State Bobcats men's basketball team
Players
Coaches

Pos.	#	Name	Height	Weight	Year	Hometown
F		Nico Harrison	6 ft 5 in (1.96 m)	—	Sr
C		Quadre Lollis	6 ft 7 in (2.01 m)	—	Sr
F		Adam Leachman	6 ft 8 in (2.03 m)	—	Sr
G		Scott Hatler	6 ft 2 in (1.88 m)	—	Sr
G		Mike Elliot	6 ft 3 in (1.91 m)	—	Sr
G		Lance Fay	6 ft 1 in (1.85 m)	—	Jr
F		Dan Sullivan	6 ft 5 in (1.96 m)	—	So
F		Scott Harry	6 ft 5 in (1.96 m)	—	So
C	55	Nate Holmstadt	6 ft 8 in (2.03 m)	—	Fr
G	22	Danny Sprinkle	6 ft 2 in (1.88 m)	—	Fr
F		Mike Henry	6 ft 5 in (1.96 m)	—	Fr

Head coach

- Mick Durham

Assistant coach(es)

Legend

- (C) Team captain
- (S) Suspended
- (I) Ineligible
- (W) Walk-on
- Injured
- Current redshirt

== Schedule and results ==
Date time, TV	Rank^{#}	Opponent^{#}	Result	Record	Site city, state
Non-conference Regular season
Nov 10, 1995*		Simon Frazer University	W 79–65	1–0	Brick Breeden Fieldhouse; Bozeman, Montana
November 25, 1995*		Minnesota-Morris	W 99-64	2-0	Brick Breeden Fieldhouse; Bozeman, Montana
November 30, 1995*		Alcorn St	W 87-79	3–0	Davey Whitney Complex; Lorman, Mississippi
Dec 3, 1995*		Eastern Michigan	L 71-95	3–1	Bowen Field House; Ypsilanti, Michigan
Dec 6, 1995*		Gonzaga	W 58–56	4–1	Brick Breeden Fieldhouse; Bozeman, Montana
Dec 14, 1995*		at Nevada	L 84–86	4–2	Lawlor Events Center; Reno, Nevada
Dec 16, 1995*		Southern Utah	W 81–51	5–2	Brick Breeden Fieldhouse; Bozeman, Montana
Dec 23, 1995*		Alcorn State	W 121–69	6–2	Brick Breeden Fieldhouse; Bozeman, Montana
Dec 29, 1995*		Butler; Bobcat Holiday Stores Classic	W 84–59	7–2	Brick Breeden Fieldhouse; Bozeman, Montana
Dec 30, 1995*		Drexel; Bobcat Holiday Stores Classic	L 62–68	7–3	Brick Breeden Fieldhouse; Bozeman, Montana
Jan 3, 1996*		at Texas Tech	L 67–86	7–4	Lubbock Municipal Coliseum; Lubbock, Texas
Jan 5, 1996*		Sacramento State	W 90–47	8–4	Brick Breeden Fieldhouse; Bozeman, Montana
Jan 7, 1996*		at TCU	L 96–98 ^{3OT}	8–5	Daniel-Meyer Coliseum; Fort Worth, Texas
Big Sky Regular season
Jan 12, 1996		Weber State	W 90–71	9–5 (1–0)	Brick Breeden Fieldhouse; Bozeman, Montana
Jan 13, 1996*		Northern Arizona	W 87–58	10–5 (2–0)	Brick Breeden Fieldhouse; Bozeman, Montana
Jan 20, 1996		Montana	W 72–65	11–5 (3–0)	Brick Breeden Fieldhouse; Bozeman, Montana
Jan 26, 1996		at Idaho State	W 89–65	12–5 (4–0)	Holt Arena; Pocatello, Idaho
Jan 27, 1996		at Boise State	L 61–69	12–6 (4–1)	BSU Pavilion; Boise, Idaho
Feb 2, 1996		Eastern Washington	W 85–66	13–6 (5–1)	Brick Breeden Fieldhouse; Bozeman, Montana
Feb 3, 1996		Idaho	W 78–70	14–6 (6–1)	Brick Breeden Fieldhouse; Bozeman, Montana
Feb 29, 1996		at Idaho	W 81–78	18–8 (10–3)	Cowan Spectrum; Moscow, Idaho
Mar 2, 1996		at Eastern Washington	W 92–64	19–8 (11–3)	Reese Court; Cheney, Washington
Big Sky tournament
Mar 8, 1996*	(1)	(6) Idaho; Semifinals	W 91–66	20–8	Brick Breeden Fieldhouse; Bozeman, Montana
Mar 9, 1996*	(1)	(2) Weber State; Championship	W 81–70	21–8	Brick Breeden Fieldhouse; Bozeman, Montana
NCAA Tournament
Mar 14, 1996*	(13 W)	vs. (4 W) No. 15 Syracuse; First round	L 55–88	21–9	University Arena; Albuquerque, New Mexico
*Non-conference game. ^{#}Rankings from AP Poll. (#) Tournament seedings in parentheses. W=West.
