= Paul R. Wylie Jr. =

American lawyer and author (born 1936)

- Born: 1936 (age 89–90); Montana
- Other name: Nick Wylie
- Occupations: Lawyer, Author
- Notable work: Montana State's Golden Bobcats, The Irish General: Thomas Francis Meagher, Blood on the Marias: The Baker Massacre
- Spouse: Arlene Marie Wylie (married 1982-present)
- Website: https://paulrwylie.com/

Paul R. Wylie Jr. (born 1936) is an American retired lawyer turned author. He is the author of three books on Montana History (The Irish General: Thomas Francis Meager, Blood on the Marias: The Baker Massacre, and Montana State's Golden Bobcats).

== Early life ==
Wylie was born in Livingston Montana, grew up in White Sulphur Springs Montana, and graduated from Montana State College in 1959 with a Bachelor of Science in chemical engineering. After graduation, he worked as a rocket engineer for three years, then started working as a patent examiner. In 1965 he went on to attend and graduate from American University in DC with a law degree.

== Legal career ==
Wylie worked as a patent lawyer in Utah, California and Montana. He opened a private practice in California and he also served as an expert witness in the Polaroid v Kodak case. In 1990 he returned to Montana and continued to work as a legal consultant.

== Authorship ==
In 2007 Wylie published The Irish General: Thomas Francis Meager through University of Oklahoma Press. The book covers the life of Montana Territorial Governor Thomas Francis Meagher. In connection with his research for the book, Wylie also produced a play titled Coroner's Inquest into the Death on July 1, 1867 of Thomas Francis Meagher which was performed in a number of venues across the state of Montana.

In 2017 Wylie published Blood on the Marias: The Baker Massacre also through University of Oklahoma Press. This work covers the 1870 U.S. Cavalry attack of a Piegan Indian Village and also dives into the history that led to the event. Working on and researching this book sparked an awareness of indigenous history and culture and inspired Wylie and his wife Arlene M. Wyle to establish the Paul R. and Arlene M. Wylie Student Endowment Fund for Native American Students for students pursuing degrees in engineering at Montana State University.

2022 he published Montana State's Golden Bobcats published with Arcadia Publishing. That book follows the 1928-29 basketball team at Montana State College, the "Bobcats". The publishing of the book was significantly delayed after Wylie was hit by a truck while walking across Main Street in Bozeman, Montana.

In 2024 he received an honorary doctorate in Humane Letters from Montana State University.
