= Tyler Hall (basketball) =

American basketball player (born 1997)

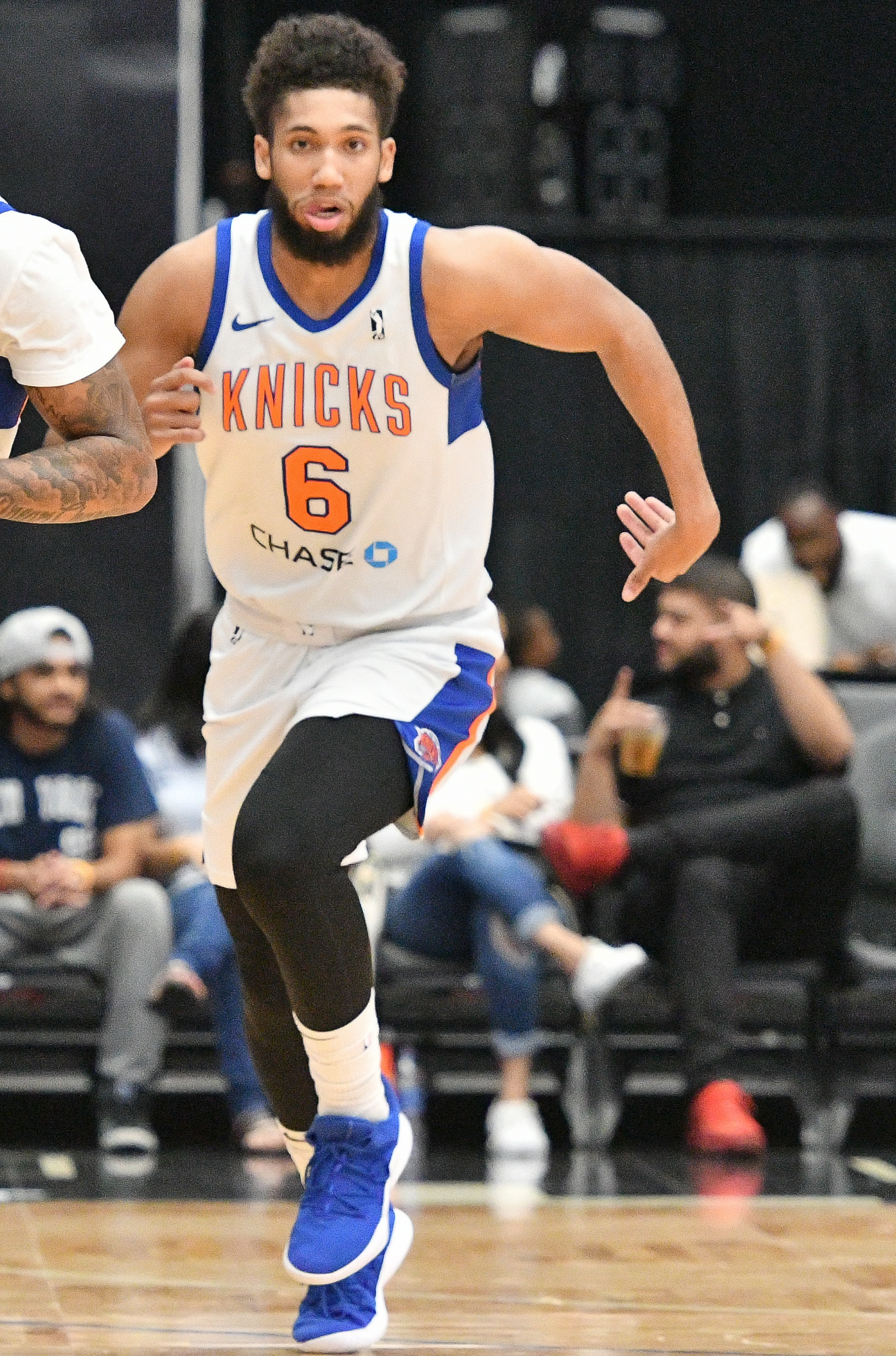

Free agent
- Position: Shooting guard / small forward

Personal information
- Born: March 25, 1997 (age 29) Rock Island, Illinois, U.S.
- Listed height: 6 ft 5 in (1.96 m)
- Listed weight: 209 lb (95 kg)

Career information
- High school: Rock Island (Rock Island, Illinois)
- College: Montana State (2015–2019)
- NBA draft: 2019: undrafted
- Playing career: 2019–present

Career history
- 2019–2022: Westchester Knicks
- 2021: New York Knicks
- 2022–2024: Texas Legends

Career highlights
- 2× First-team All-Big Sky (2017, 2019)
- Stats at NBA.com
- Stats at Basketball Reference

Tyler Jordan Hall (born March 25, 1997) is an American professional basketball player who last played for the Texas Legends of the NBA G League. He played college basketball for the Montana State Bobcats.

== High school career ==
Hall attended Rock Island High School. He was named the 2014–15 Dispatch/Argus Metro boys' basketball co-player of the Year. Hall was twice named to the All-State team but was lightly recruited out of high school.

== College career ==
As a freshman, Hall averaged 18.6 points per game and was named Big Sky Freshman of the Year. Hall had a career-high 42 points in a game against Milwaukee on December 5, 2016. He posted 23.1 points, 5.4 rebounds and 2.8 assists per game as a sophomore. Hall was named to the First-team All-Big Sky Conference. As a junior, Hall averaged 17.5 points and 7.7 rebounds per game. He declared for the 2018 NBA draft but decided to return to school.

Hall eclipsed the 2,000-point mark in an 81–76 win over North Dakota. As a senior, Hall averaged 20.5 points, 2.8 assists and 4.7 rebounds per game. He was named to the First-team All-Big Sky Conference. He ranks ninth all-time in 3-pointers made in Division I basketball with 431. Hall finished his career with 2,518 points, breaking the Big Sky Conference record of held by Eastern Washington's Bogdan Bliznyuk.

== Professional career ==
=== Westchester / New York Knicks (2019–2022) ===
Hall participated in the 2019 NBA Summer League with the Chicago Bulls. He was selected fourth overall in the 2019 NBA G League draft by the Westchester Knicks. In January 2020, he averaged 12.3 points and 4.0 rebounds per game. On the season, he averaged 9.3 points and 3.4 rebounds per game, and his 91 three-pointers were second most for a Westchester rookie.

On December 12, 2020, Hall was signed by the New York Knicks, and then waived on December 14. He rejoined the Westchester Knicks and averaged 10.1 points, 4.1 rebounds and 2.6 assists per game in the 2020–21 season.

In August 2021, Hall joined the New York Knicks for the 2021 NBA Summer League and on October 8, he signed with them. However, he was waived by the Knicks near the end of training camp. In October 2021, Hall was included on the training camp roster of the Westchester Knicks. In 11 games, he averaged 14.6 points, 4.2 rebounds and 3.2 assists over 38.5 minutes.

On December 18, 2021, Hall signed a 10-day contract with the New York Knicks and made his lone NBA appearance to date, playing two minutes on Christmas Eve against the Atlanta Hawks. Following the expiration of his 10-day contract, he was reacquired and activated by Westchester on January 2, 2022. In the first game of the regular season, Hall posted 31 points, 6 assists and 5 rebounds in a 127–108 loss to the Grand Rapids Gold.

=== Texas Legends (2022–2024) ===
In September 2022, Hall was signed by the Dallas Mavericks, but was waived on October 13. He later signed with the Texas Legends and was named to their opening night roster on November 3.

== Career statistics ==
Legend
GP	Games played	GS	Games started	MPG	Minutes per game
FG%	Field goal percentage	3P%	3-point field goal percentage	FT%	Free throw percentage
RPG	Rebounds per game	APG	Assists per game	SPG	Steals per game
BPG	Blocks per game	PPG	Points per game	**Bold**	Career high

=== NBA ===
Year	Team	GP	GS	MPG	FG%	3P%	FT%	RPG	APG	SPG	BPG	PPG
2021–22	New York	1	0	2.0	—	—	—	.0	.0	.0	.0	.0
Career		1	0	2.0	—	—	—	.0	.0	.0	.0	.0

=== College ===
Year	Team	GP	GS	MPG	FG%	3P%	FT%	RPG	APG	SPG	BPG	PPG
2015–16	Montana State	31	31	32.0	.457	**.430**	.867	5.3	1.6	.9	.3	18.6
2016–17	Montana State	**32**	**32**	**34.4**	**.476**	.429	.837	**5.4**	**2.8**	**1.1**	**.4**	**23.1**
2017–18	Montana State	31	29	32.1	.407	.372	**.907**	3.7	**2.8**	.8	**.4**	17.5
2018–19	Montana State	**32**	**32**	33.5	.447	.377	.833	4.7	**2.8**	**1.1**	.3	20.5
Career		126	124	33.0	.448	.400	.859	4.8	2.5	1.0	.3	20.0

== See also ==
- List of NCAA Division I men's basketball career scoring leaders
- List of NCAA Division I men's basketball career 3-point scoring leaders
