= 1985–86 Boise State Broncos men's basketball team =

American college basketball season

1985–86 Boise State Broncos men's basketball
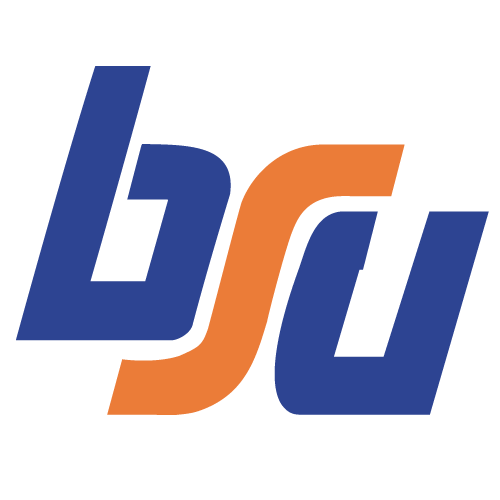
- Conference: Big Sky Conference
- Record: 12–16 (6–8 Big Sky)
- Head coach: Bobby Dye (3rd season)
- Assistant coach: Rod Jensen
- Home arena: BSU Pavilion

1985–86 Big Sky Conference men's basketball standings
	Conf.				Overall
Team	W		L	PCT	W		L	PCT
Northern Arizona	9	–	5	.643	19	–	10	.655
Montana	9	–	5	.643	21	–	11	.656
Idaho State	8	–	6	.571	15	–	12	.556
Weber State	7	–	7	.500	18	–	11	.621
Nevada	7	–	7	.500	13	–	15	.464
Montana State †	6	–	8	.429	14	–	17	.452
Boise State	6	–	8	.429	12	–	16	.429
Idaho	4	–	10	.286	11	–	18	.379
† 1986 Big Sky tournament winner

The 1985–86 Boise State Broncos men's basketball team represented Boise State University during the 1985–86 NCAA Division I men's basketball season. The Broncos were led by third-year head coach Bobby Dye and played their home games on campus at the BSU Pavilion in Boise, Idaho.

They finished the regular season at 12–15 overall, with a 6–8 record in the Big Sky Conference, tied for sixth in the standings.

In the conference tournament in Reno, Nevada, the fifth-seeded Broncos were defeated at the buzzer by Weber State in the quarterfinal round.

== Postseason result ==
Date time, TV	Rank^{#}	Opponent^{#}	Result	Record	Site (attendance) city, state
Big Sky tournament
Thu, March 6; 3:00 pm	(5)	vs. (4) Weber State; Quarterfinal	L 76–79	12–16	Lawlor Events Center (3,500); Reno, Nevada
*Non-conference game. ^{#}Rankings from AP poll. (#) Tournament seedings in parentheses. All times are in Mountain time.
