= Steve McClain =

American basketball coach (born 1962)

Current position
- Title: Assistant coach
- Team: Tennessee
- Conference: SEC

Biographical details
- Born: August 15, 1962 (age 64); Orient, Iowa, U.S.
- Education: Chadron State

Coaching career (HC unless noted)
- 1982–1984: Chadron State (asst.)
- 1984: Sioux Empire JC (asst.)
- 1985: Independence CC (asst.)
- 1986–1991: Hutchinson CC (asst.)
- 1991–1994: Hutchinson CC
- 1994–1998: TCU (asst.)
- 1998–2007: Wyoming
- 2007–2010: Colorado (asst.)
- 2010–2015: Indiana (asst.)
- 2015–2020: UIC
- 2020–2022: Georgia (asst.)
- 2022–2025: Texas (asst.)
- 2025–present: Tennessee (asst.)

Head coaching record
- Overall: 324–224 (.591)
- Tournaments: 1–1 (NCAA Division I); 2–3 (NIT); 2–1 (CBI); 3–1 (CIT)

Accomplishments and honors

Championships
- NJCAA Division I tournament (1994); 2 KJCCC regular season (1993, 1994); 2 MWC regular season (2001, 2002)

Awards
- MWC Coach of the Year (2002)

Steven James McClain (born August 15, 1962) is an assistant basketball coach at Tennessee. Previously, he was an assistant basketball coach at Texas for three seasons. McClain was also the head coach at the University of Wyoming from 1998-2007, where he saw his greatest headcoaching successes, and at the University of Illinois Chicago for five seasons. Prior to UIC, he had spent five seasons on the staff of Tom Crean at Indiana Hoosiers men's basketball team.

== Coaching career ==
=== Hutchinson Community College ===
McClain was the head basketball coach at Hutchinson CC from 1991 to 1994. While there, they won a NJCAA national championship during the 1993–94 season. His overall record at Hutchinson was 91–16.

=== Wyoming ===
McClain was the head basketball coach at Wyoming from 1998 to 2007. In four out of his 9 seasons, Wyoming had made it to either the NCAA tournament, or the NIT tournament. His overall record at Wyoming was 157–115. However, after a disappointing 2006 campaign where he went 17–15, with no postseason berth, he was fired. His Wyoming team made the NCAA tournament in 2002, which was UW's first NCAA bid in twenty-five years, and Wyoming made it to the second round, which was their best finish since 1987. He was named the MWC coach of the year that season.

Steve McClain was known for his very animated and intense coaching style during games.

His teams have won two regular season conference championships. In six out of the 8 seasons he has coached in the MWC, at least one of his players has received First team All MWC honors. From 2000 to 2002, the Cowboys won at least 20 games in all three of their seasons, marking the first time that happened in two decades.

=== UIC ===
McClain parted ways with UIC after five seasons on March 13, 2020 after a 18–17 season that fell 1 win short of an NCAA tournament bid.

=== Assistant coach ===
As an assistant at Colorado, McClain served as acting head coach during the absence of head coach Jeff Bzdelik for a portion of the 2009–10 season. He helped lead the Buffaloes to a 15–16 record, with seven of those losses coming by six points or less. While at Texas, McClain was a part of the Longhorns Big-12 Tournament Championship as well as an Elite-8 finish in the 2023 NCAA Tournament.

On April 22, 2020, Georgia announced the hiring of McClain as an assistant coach, reuniting him with Tom Crean who was the head coach at Indiana where McClain was the assistant for the 2010–15 seasons.

In 2022, McClain was hired by Texas as an assistant coach. After the departure of Rodney Terry at the end of the 2024-25 season, McClain left Texas and was hired at Tennessee.

== Head coaching record ==
Record table
| Season | Team | Overall | Conference | Standing | Postseason |
|---|---|---|---|---|---|
Hutchinson Blue Dragons (Kansas Jayhawk Community College Conference) (1991–1994)
| 1991–92 | Hutchinson CC | 27–7 | 6–6 | 4th | NJCAA Division I Regional |
| 1992–93 | Hutchinson CC | 29–5 | 11–1 | T–1st | NJCAA Division I Regional |
| 1993–94 | Hutchinson CC | 35–4 | 10–2 | T–1st | NJCAA Division I Champion |
| Hutchinson CC: | | 91–16 (.850) | 27–9 (.750) | | |
Wyoming Cowboys (Western Athletic Conference) (1998–1999)
| 1998–99 | Wyoming | 18–10 | 7–7 | T–4th (Mountain) | NIT Second Round |
Wyoming Cowboys (Mountain West Conference) (1999–2007)
| 1999–00 | Wyoming | 19–12 | 8–6 | T–4th | |
| 2000–01 | Wyoming | 20–10 | 10–4 | T–1st | NIT First Round |
| 2001–02 | Wyoming | 22–9 | 11–3 | 1st | NCAA Division I Second Round |
| 2002–03 | Wyoming | 21–11 | 8–6 | T–4th | NIT Second Round |
| 2003–04 | Wyoming | 11–17 | 4–10 | 8th | |
| 2004–05 | Wyoming | 15–13 | 7–7 | T–4th | |
| 2005–06 | Wyoming | 14–18 | 5–11 | 7th | |
| 2006–07 | Wyoming | 17–15 | 7–9 | 5th | |
| Wyoming: | | 157–115 (.577) | 73–71 (.507) | | |
UIC Flames (Horizon League) (2015–2020)
| 2015–16 | UIC | 5–25 | 3–15 | 10th | |
| 2016–17 | UIC | 17–19 | 7–11 | 6th | CBI Semifinals |
| 2017–18 | UIC | 20–16 | 12–6 | 3rd | CIT Runner-Up |
| 2018–19 | UIC | 16–16 | 10–8 | 5th | |
| 2019–20 | UIC | 18–17 | 10–8 | T-4th | |
| UIC: | | 76–93 (.450) | 42–48 (.467) | | |
| Total: | | 324–224 (.591) | | | |
National champion Postseason invitational champion Conference regular season champion Conference regular season and conference tournament champion Division regular season champion Division regular season and conference tournament champion Conference tournament champion
