= Jack Gillespie =

American basketball player

Personal information
- Born: October 1, 1947 (age 79)
- Listed height: 6 ft 6 in (1.98 m)
- Listed weight: 215 lb (98 kg)

Career information
- High school: Great Falls (Great Falls, Montana)
- College: Montana State (1966–1969)
- NBA draft: 1969: 12th round, 166th overall pick
- Drafted by: Los Angeles Lakers
- Position: Forward
- Number: 11

Career history
- 1969: New York Nets
- Stats at Basketball Reference

Jack A. Gillespie (born October 1, 1947) is an American former professional basketball forward who played one season in the American Basketball Association (ABA) as a member of the New York Nets during the 1969–70 season.

He graduated from Great Falls High School in Great Falls, Montana, where he led the team to a Montana High School Basketball Championship in 1964. He attended Montana State University where he finished his college career as the school's all-time leader in rebounds (1,011) and points (1,543) along with two Big Sky Conference Player of the Year awards. Gellespie went on to be inducted into the Montana State Bobcats' Hall of Fame.

He was selected in the 12^{th} (166^{th} pick overall) round of the 1969 NBA draft by the Los Angeles Lakers, but never signed.

In 1999, Sports Illustrated ranked him forty-seventh in a list of Montana's 50 greatest athletes of all time. The Great Falls Tribune newspaper in 2014 listed him as one of the top four athletes to play high school basketball in the city.
