= Hermenegildo Mbunga =

Angolan basketball player (born 1985)

Divaldo Mbunga
Personal information
- Born: 4 September 1985 (age 41) Luanda, Angola
- Listed height: 2.06 m (6 ft 9 in)
- Listed weight: 109 kg (240 lb)

Career information
- College: Peninsula JC (2005–2007); Montana State (2007–2009)
- NBA draft: 2009: undrafted
- Playing career: 2003–2019
- Position: Center
- Number: 16

Career history
- 2003–2005: Petro de Luanda
- 2009–2017: Petro de Luanda
- 2017–2018: Benfica do Libolo
- 2018–2019: Petro de Luanda
Medals
Men's basketball
Representing Angola
African Games
Gold medal – first place	Brazzaville 2015	National Team
FIBA Africa Under-18 Championship
Silver medal – second place	Alexandria 2002	National Team
FIBA Africa Clubs Champions Cup
Silver medal – second place	Kigali 2009	Petro Atlético
Silver medal – second place	Malabo 2012	Petro Atlético

Hermenegildo Divaldo Pedro Mieze Mbunga (born 4 September 1985) is an Angolan retired basketball player.

== College career ==
Mbunga played collegiately with the Montana State Bobcats in the United States. After two years at Peninsula Junior College, Mbunga transferred to Montana State in 2007. In 2007–08, Mbunga averaged 12 points per game and 5.5 rebounds in 26 minutes per game.

== National team career ==
Mbunga was offered a spot on the Angola national basketball team for the 2008 Summer Olympics but declined, citing academic concerns.

== See also ==
- Angola national basketball team
