= 2001–02 Air Force Falcons men's basketball team =

American college basketball season

2001–02 Air Force Falcons men's basketball
- Conference: Mountain West Conference
- Record: 9–20 (4–11 Mountain West)
- Head coach: Joe Scott (2nd season)
- Home arena: Clune Arena

2001–02 Mountain West Conference men's basketball standings
| | Conf. | | | | Overall |
| Team | W | | L | PCT | W | | L | PCT |
|---|---|---|---|---|---|---|---|---|
| Wyoming | 11 | – | 3 | .786 | 22 | – | 9 | .710 |
| Utah | 10 | – | 4 | .714 | 21 | – | 9 | .700 |
| UNLV | 9 | – | 5 | .643 | 21 | – | 11 | .656 |
| BYU | 7 | – | 7 | .500 | 18 | – | 12 | .600 |
| San Diego State † | 7 | – | 7 | .500 | 21 | – | 12 | .636 |
| New Mexico | 6 | – | 8 | .429 | 16 | – | 14 | .533 |
| Colorado State | 3 | – | 11 | .214 | 12 | – | 18 | .400 |
| Air Force | 3 | – | 11 | .214 | 9 | – | 19 | .321 |
† 2002 Mountain West tournament winner Rankings from AP Poll

The 2001–02 Air Force Falcons men's basketball team represented the United States Air Force Academy in the 2001–02 NCAA Division I men's basketball season. Led by 2nd-year head coach Joe Scott, they played their home games at Clune Arena on the Air Force Academy's main campus in Colorado Springs, Colorado. Air Force finished 9–19 overall and tied for last place in the Mountain West with a 3–11 conference record.

== Roster ==
| # | Name | Height | Weight (lbs.) | Class | Position | Hometown | Previous school |
|---|---|---|---|---|---|---|---|
| | Tom Bellairs | 6–7 | | Junior | Center | | |
| | Joel Gerlach | 6–7 | | Sophomore | Forward | | |
| | Marc Holum | 6–6 | | Freshmen | Forward | | |
| | Vernard Jenkins | 5-9 | | Junior | Guard | | |
| | Tim Keller | 6-3 | | Freshmen | Guard | | |
| | A.J. Kuhle | 6-4 | | Sophomore | Forward | | |
| | Eric Lang | 6-4 | | Freshmen | Forward | | |
| | Danny Legans | 6-3 | | Sophomore | Forward | | |
| | Selwyn Mansell | 5-11 | | Senior | Guard | | |
| | David Patterson | 6-8 | | Freshmen | Forward | | |
| | Tysen Pina | 6-8 | | sophomore | Forward | | |
| | Robert Todd | 6-6 | | Sophomore | Forward | | |
| | Lamoni Yazzie | 6-1 | | Senior | Guard | | |

== Schedule and results ==
| Date time, TV | Rank^{#} | Opponent^{#} | Result | Record | Site (attendance) city, state |
Regular season
| 10/31/01; 7:05 pm | | Athletes in Action | W 78–76 | | Clune Arena; Colorado Springs, CO |
| 11/05/01; 7:05 pm | | EA Sports All-Stars | L 73–76 | | Clune Arena; Colorado Springs, CO |
Regular season
| 11/13/01; 4:30 pm | | at Yale | W 68–62 | 1–0 | Payne Whitney Gymnasium; New Haven, CT |
| 11/14/01; 6:00 pm | | at No. 8 Missouri; Guardians Classic – Campus Game | L 56–86 | 1–1 | Mizzou Arena (8,915); Columbia, MO |
| 11/18/01; 1:00 pm | | at Denver | W 52–44 | 2–1 | Mizzou Arena; Denver, CO |
| 11/24/01; 1:00 pm | | at Navy | L 53–71 | 2–2 | Alumni Hall; Annapolis, MD |
| 11/30/01; 6:30 pm | | at Montana State; McCaffrey Classic | W 70–65 | 3–2 | Worthington Arena; Bozeman, MT |
| 12/01/01 | | at No. 24 Fresno State | L 52–68 | 3–3 | Worthington Arena; Bozeman, MT |
| 12/05/01; 7:05 pm | | Arkansas State | W 67–63 ^{OT} | 4–3 | Clune Arena; Colorado Springs, CO |
| 12/08/01; 2:00 pm | | Oakland | L 53–57 | 4–4 | Clune Arena; Colorado Springs, CO |
| 12/12/01; 7:00 pm | | at Denver | L 53–63 | 4–5 | Magness Arena; Denver, CO |
| 12/22/01; 5:30 pm | | at Liberty | W 66–54 | 5–5 | Vines Center; Lynchburg, VA |
| 12/29/01; 2:00 pm | | at Tennessee | L 44–64 | 5–6 | Eblen Center; Cookeville, TN |
| 01/02/02; 7:05 pm | | at Northern Arizona | W 57–56 | 6–6 | Walkup Skydome; Flagstaff, AZ |
| 01/07/02; 7:05 pm | | at UNLV | L 54–66 | 6–7 | Thomas & Mack Center; Las Vegas, NV |
| 01/10/02; 7:00 pm | | at Texas-Pan American | L 52–58 ^{OT} | 6–8 | UTPA Fieldhouse; Edinburg, TX |
| 01/14/02; 10:00 pm, ESPN | | at New Mexico | L 47–50 | 6–9 | The Pit; Albuquerque, NM |
| 01/19/02; 3:00 pm | | Utah | L 57–63 ^{OT} | 6–10 | Clune Arena; Colorado Springs, CO |
| 01/21/02; 2:00 pm | | BYU | W 74–64 | 7–10 | Clune Arena; Colorado Springs, CO |
| 01/26/02; 1:00 pm, ESPN | | at Colorado State | L 57–60 | 7–11 | Moby Arena; Fort Collins, CO |
| 01/28/02; 7:00 pm | | at Wyoming | L 76–83 ^{4OT} | 7–12 | Arena-Auditorium; Laramie, WY |
| 02/04/02; 7:05 pm | | San Diego State | W 67–54 | 8–12 | Clune Arena; Colorado Springs, CO |
| 02/09/02; 2:00 pm | | New Mexico | W 47–44 | 9–12 | Clune Arena; Colorado Springs, CO |
| 02/16/02; 6:00 pm | | at Utah | L 51–59 | 9–13 | Jon M. Huntsman Center; Salt Lake City, UT |
| 02/18/02; 9:30 pm | | at BYU | L 51–67 | 9–14 | Marriott Center; Provo, UT |
| 02/23/02; 2:00 pm | | Wyoming | L 48–51 | 9–15 | Clune Arena; Colorado Springs, CO |
| 02/25/02; 7:05 pm | | Colorado State | L 51–59 | 9–16 | Clune Arena; Colorado Springs, CO |
| 02/28/02; 8:35 pm | | at UNLV | L 66–73 | 9–17 | Thomas & Mack Center; Las Vegas, NV |
| 03/02/02; 7:35 pm | | at San Diego State | L 47–49 | 9–18 | Viejas Arena; San Diego, CA |
2002 Mountain West Conference men's basketball tournament
| 03/07/02; 1:00 pm, ESPN+ | (8) | vs. (1) Wyoming; Quarterfinals | L 67–69 | 9–19 | Thomas & Mack Center; Paradise, Nevada |
*Non-conference game. ^{#}Rankings from AP Poll/Coaches' Poll. (#) Tournament seedings in parentheses. All times are in Mountain Time.
