= 2002 Big Sky Conference men's basketball tournament =

2002 basketball tournament held in Bozeman, Montana

- Classification: Division I
- Season: 2001–02
- Teams: 6
- Site: Brick Breeden Fieldhouse; Bozeman, MT
- Champions: Montana (4th title)
- Winning coach: Don Holst (1st title)
- MVP: Dan Trammel (Montana)

2001–02 Big Sky men's basketball standings
	Conf.				Overall
Team	W		L	PCT	W		L	PCT
Montana State	12	–	2	.857	20	–	10	.667
Eastern Washington	10	–	4	.714	17	–	13	.567
Weber State	8	–	6	.571	18	–	11	.621
Montana †	7	–	7	.500	16	–	15	.516
Northern Arizona	7	–	7	.500	14	–	14	.500
Portland State	6	–	8	.429	12	–	16	.429
Idaho State	3	–	11	.214	10	–	17	.370
Sacramento State	3	–	11	.214	9	–	19	.321
† Conference tournament winner

The 2002 Big Sky Conference men's basketball tournament was held March 7–9 at the Brick Breeden Fieldhouse at Montana State University in Bozeman, Montana.

Fourth-seeded Montana upset second-seeded Eastern Washington in the championship game, 70–66, to win their fourth Big Sky men's basketball tournament title.

The Grizzlies, in turn, received an automatic bid to the 2002 NCAA tournament. No other Big Sky members were invited this year.

== Format ==
Cal State Northridge departed the Big Sky for the Big West prior to the 2001–02 season, decreasing total membership back to eight.

Nonetheless, no changes were made to the existing tournament format. Only the top six teams from the regular season conference standings were invited to the tournament. The two top teams were given byes into the semifinals while the third- through sixth-seeded teams were placed and paired into the preliminary quarterfinal round. Following the quarterfinals, the two victorious teams were re-seeded for the semifinal round, with the lowest-seeded remaining team paired with the tournament's highest seed and vis-versa for the other.

== Bracket ==
Quarterfinals; Thursday, March 7
4	Montana	82
5	Northern Arizona	64
3	Weber State	84
6	Portland State	62

Semifinals; Friday, March 8
1	Montana State	68
4	Montana	70
2	Eastern Washington	62
3	Weber State	57

Championship; Saturday, March 9
4	Montana	70
2	Eastern Washington	66

== See also ==
- Big Sky Conference women's basketball tournament
