= 2001–02 Wyoming Cowboys basketball team =

American college basketball season

2001–02 Wyoming Cowboys basketball

Mountain West Regular season champion

NCAA tournament, second round
- Conference: Mountain West Conference
- Record: 22–9 (11–3 Mountain West)
- Head coach: Steve McClain (4th season)
- Home arena: Arena-Auditorium (Capacity: 15,028)

2001–02 Mountain West Conference men's basketball standings
	Conf.				Overall
Team	W		L	PCT	W		L	PCT
Wyoming	11	–	3	.786	22	–	9	.710
Utah	10	–	4	.714	21	–	9	.700
UNLV	9	–	5	.643	21	–	11	.656
BYU	7	–	7	.500	18	–	12	.600
San Diego State †	7	–	7	.500	21	–	12	.636
New Mexico	6	–	8	.429	16	–	14	.533
Colorado State	3	–	11	.214	12	–	18	.400
Air Force	3	–	11	.214	9	–	19	.321
† 2002 Mountain West tournament winner Rankings from AP Poll

The 2001–02 Wyoming Cowboys basketball team represented the University of Wyoming during the 2011–2012 NCAA Division I men's basketball season. The team was led by fourth-year head coach Steve McClain and played their home games at the Arena-Auditorium in Laramie, Wyoming. The Cowboys were a member of the Mountain West Conference. Wyoming finished the season 22–9, 11–3 in Mountain West play to finish in first place. They lost to San Diego State in the semifinals of the Mountain West Basketball tournament. The Cowboys received an at-large bid to the NCAA tournament as No. 11 seed in the West region. In the opening round, they defeated No. 6 seed Gonzaga before falling to No. 3 seed Arizona in the second round. This was Wyoming's first trip to the round of 32 since 1987 and, as of the 2021–22 season, its most recent NCAA Tournament victory.

== Roster ==
2001–02 Wyoming Cowboys men's basketball team
Players
Coaches

Pos.	#	Name	Height	Weight	Year	Previous school	Hometown
F	44	Marcus Bailey	6 ft 5 in (1.96 m)	190 lb (86 kg)	Jr		Cheyenne, Wyoming
F	22	Josh Davis	6 ft 8 in (2.03 m)	235 lb (107 kg)	Sr	Salem Academy	Salem, Oregon

Head coach

- Steve McClain (Chadron State)

Assistant coach(es)

Legend

- (C) Team captain
- (S) Suspended
- (I) Ineligible
- (W) Walk-on
- Injured
- Current redshirt

Roster

== Schedule and results ==
Date time, TV	Rank^{#}	Opponent^{#}	Result	Record	Site (attendance) city, state
Non-conference regular season
Nov 13, 2001*		at No. 20 USC	L 55–68	0–1	L.A. Sports Arena; Los Angeles, California
Nov 19, 2001*		Arkansas–Pine Bluff	W 94–74	1–1	Arena-Auditorium; Laramie, Wyoming
Nov 24, 2001*		Eastern Kentucky	W 98–78	2–1	Arena-Auditorium; Laramie, Wyoming
Nov 26, 2001*		at Denver	W 71–68	3–1	Magness Arena; Denver, Colorado
Nov 28, 2001*		at Detroit	L 57–73	3–2	Calihan Hall; Detroit, Michigan
Dec 1, 2001*		Cal State Fullerton	W 86–71	4–2	Arena-Auditorium; Laramie, Wyoming
Dec 6, 2001*		Cal State Northridge	W 86–64	5–2	Arena-Auditorium; Laramie, Wyoming
Dec 12, 2001*		at Boise State	L 74–77	5–3	BSU Pavilion; Boise, Idaho
Dec 15, 2001*		Montana State	W 82–69	6–3	Arena-Auditorium; Laramie, Wyoming
Dec 19, 2001*		Indiana State	W 72–58	7–3	Arena-Auditorium; Laramie, Wyoming
Dec 22, 2001*		Alaska Anchorage	W 85–67	8–3	Arena-Auditorium; Laramie, Wyoming
Dec 29, 2001*		Portland State	W 104–58	9–3	Arena-Auditorium; Laramie, Wyoming
Jan 1, 2002*		at Texas Tech	L 84–90	9–4	United Spirit Arena; Lubbock, Texas
Mountain West Regular Season
Jan 5, 2002		at UNLV	W 69–59	10–4 (1–0)	Thomas & Mack Center; Las Vegas, Nevada
Jan 12, 2002		Colorado State	W 95–82	11–4 (2–0)	Arena-Auditorium; Laramie, Wyoming
Jan 21, 2002; 8:00 p.m.		at San Diego State	W 88–85 ^{OT}	12–4 (3–0)	Cox Arena; San Diego, California
Jan 26, 2002		New Mexico	W 79–67	13–4 (4–0)	Arena-Auditorium; Laramie, Wyoming
Jan 28, 2002; 7:00 p.m.		Air Force	W 83–76 ^{4OT}	14–4 (5–0)	Arena-Auditorium; Laramie, Wyoming
Feb 2, 2002		at BYU	L 70–85	14–5 (5–1)	Marriott Center; Provo, Utah
Feb 4, 2002; 10:00 p.m.		at Utah	W 54–46	15–5 (6–1)	Jon M. Huntsman Center; Salt Lake City, Utah
Feb 9, 2002		at Colorado State	W 72–69 ^{OT}	16–5 (7–1)	Moby Arena; Fort Collins, Colorado
Feb 16, 2002		UNLV	W 82–78	17–5 (8–1)	Arena-Auditorium; Laramie, Wyoming
Feb 18, 2002; 8:00 p.m.		San Diego State	L 64–68	17–6 (8–2)	Arena-Auditorium; Laramie, Wyoming
Feb 23, 2002; 2:00 p.m.		at Air Force	W 51–48	18–6 (9–2)	Clune Arena; Colorado Springs, Colorado
Feb 25, 2002		at New Mexico	L 65–74	18–7 (9–3)	University Arena; Albuquerque, New Mexico
Feb 28, 2002		BYU	W 76–60	19–7 (10–3)	Arena-Auditorium; Laramie, Wyoming
Mar 2, 2002; 1:00 p.m.		Utah	W 57–56	20–7 (11–3)	Arena-Auditorium; Laramie, Wyoming
Mountain West tournament
Mar 7, 2002*; 1:00 p.m., ESPN+	(1)	vs. (8) Air Force; Quarterfinals	W 69–67 ^{OT}	21–7	Thomas & Mack Center; Las Vegas, Nevada
Mar 8, 2002*; 12:00 p.m.	(1)	vs. (5) San Diego State; Semifinals	L 69–70	21–8	Thomas & Mack Center; Las Vegas, Nevada
NCAA tournament
Mar 14, 2002*	(11 W)	vs. (6 W) No. 6 Gonzaga; First Round	W 73–66	22–8	University Arena; Albuquerque, New Mexico
Mar 16, 2002*	(11 W)	vs. (3 W) No. 7 Arizona; Second Round	L 60–68	22–9	University Arena; Albuquerque, New Mexico
*Non-conference game. ^{#}Rankings from AP poll. (#) Tournament seedings in parentheses. W=West. All times are in Mountain Time.
