= 1986 Big Sky Conference men's basketball tournament =

- Classification: Division I
- Season: 1985–86
- Teams: 7
- Site: Lawlor Events Center; Reno, Nevada
- Champions: Montana State (1st title)
- Winning coach: Stu Starner (1st title)
- MVP: Tony Hampton (Montana State)

1985–86 Big Sky Conference men's basketball standings
	Conf.				Overall
Team	W		L	PCT	W		L	PCT
Northern Arizona	9	–	5	.643	19	–	10	.655
Montana	9	–	5	.643	21	–	11	.656
Idaho State	8	–	6	.571	15	–	12	.556
Weber State	7	–	7	.500	18	–	11	.621
Nevada	7	–	7	.500	13	–	15	.464
Montana State †	6	–	8	.429	14	–	17	.452
Boise State	6	–	8	.429	12	–	16	.429
Idaho	4	–	10	.286	11	–	18	.379
† 1986 Big Sky tournament winner

The 1986 Big Sky Conference men's basketball tournament was held March 6–8 at the Lawlor Events Center in Reno, Nevada.

Sixth-seeded Montana State upset rival Montana in the championship game, 82–77, for their first Big Sky tournament title. The Bobcats upset host and defending champion Nevada by a point in the first round with a field goal at the buzzer, then shocked regular season champion Northern Arizona by six in the semifinals.

== Format ==
On probation, third-place Idaho State did not participate in this year's tournament, reducing the field to seven teams. Regular season champion Northern Arizona received a bye into the semifinals to play the lowest remaining seed, and the other six teams were paired up in the quarterfinals on Thursday.

== Bracket ==
Quarterfinals; Thursday, March 6
6	Montana State	81
3	Nevada	80
4	Weber State	79
5	Boise State	76
7	Idaho	60
2	Montana	68

Semifinals; Friday, March 7
1	Northern Arizona	74
6	Montana State	80
4	Weber State	68
2	Montana	72

Championship; Saturday, March 8
6	Montana State	82
2	Montana	77

== NCAA tournament ==
Montana State received the automatic bid to the 64-team NCAA tournament; no other Big Sky members were invited. The Bobcats were the sixteenth seed in the West regional, and lost by nine to St. John's in the first round at Long Beach, California.

Northern Arizona and Montana played in the NIT, but both lost in the first round.
