= 1996 Big Sky Conference men's basketball tournament =

- Classification: Division I
- Season: 1995–96
- Teams: 6
- Site: Brick Breeden Fieldhouse; Bozeman, MT
- Champions: Montana State (2nd title)
- Winning coach: Mick Durham (1st title)
- MVP: Danny Sprinkle (Montana State)

1995–96 Big Sky men's basketball standings
	Conf.				Overall
Team	W		L	PCT	W		L	PCT
Montana State †	11	–	3	.786	21	–	9	.700
Weber State	10	–	4	.714	20	–	10	.667
Montana	10	–	4	.714	20	–	8	.714
Boise State	10	–	4	.714	15	–	13	.536
Idaho State	7	–	7	.500	11	–	15	.423
Idaho	5	–	9	.357	12	–	16	.429
Northern Arizona	3	–	11	.214	6	–	20	.231
Eastern Washington	0	–	14	.000	3	–	23	.115
† 1996 Big Sky tournament winner

The 1996 Big Sky Conference men's basketball tournament was held March 7–9 at Brick Breeden Fieldhouse at Montana State University in Bozeman, Montana.

Top-seeded host Montana State defeated defending champion Weber State in the championship game, 81–70, for their second Big Sky men's basketball tournament title.

== Format ==
Conference membership remained with the same eight teams, and no changes were made to the existing tournament format. The top six teams from the regular season participated, and the top two earned byes into the semifinals. The remaining four played in the quarterfinals, and the top seed met the lowest remaining seed in the semifinals.

== Bracket ==
Quarterfinals; Thursday, March 7
3	Montana	67
6	Idaho	72
5	Idaho State	54
4	Boise State	66

Semifinals; Friday, March 8
1	Montana State	91
6	Idaho	66
4	Boise State	70
2	Weber State	77

Championship; Saturday, March 9
1	Montana State	81
2	Weber State	70

== NCAA tournament ==
Montana State received the automatic bid to the NCAA tournament; no other Big Sky members were invited, or to the NIT. Seeded thirteenth in the West regional, the Bobcats fell 88–55 to Syracuse in the first round in Albuquerque.

== See also ==
- Big Sky Conference women's basketball tournament
