= 2001–02 San Diego State Aztecs men's basketball team =

American college basketball season

2001–02 San Diego State Aztecs men's basketball
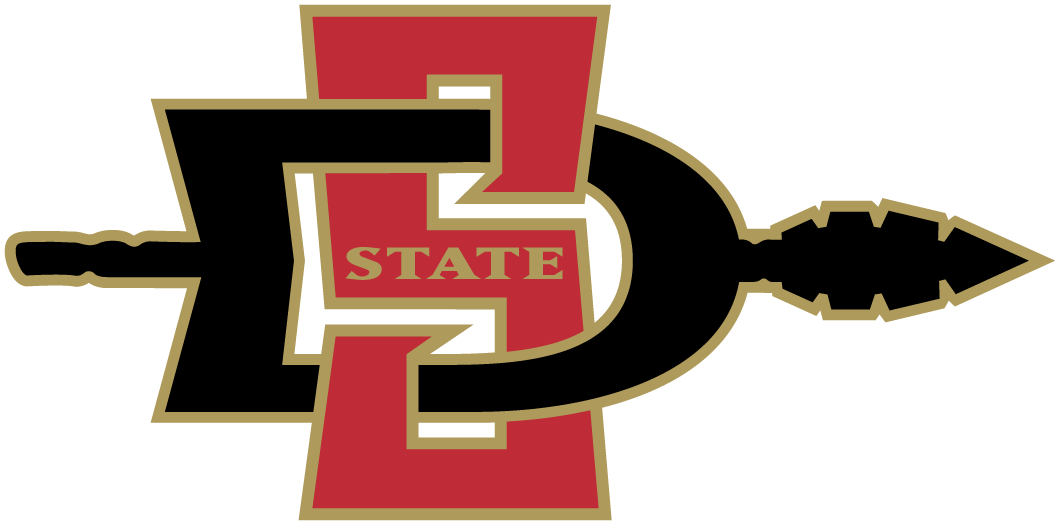

Mountain West tournament champions

NCAA tournament
- Conference: Mountain West Conference
- Record: 21–12 (7–7 Mountain West)
- Head coach: Steve Fisher (3rd season)
- Assistant coach: Brian Dutcher
- Home arena: Cox Arena

2001–02 Mountain West Conference men's basketball standings
	Conf.				Overall
Team	W		L	PCT	W		L	PCT
Wyoming	11	–	3	.786	22	–	9	.710
Utah	10	–	4	.714	21	–	9	.700
UNLV	9	–	5	.643	21	–	11	.656
BYU	7	–	7	.500	18	–	12	.600
San Diego State †	7	–	7	.500	21	–	12	.636
New Mexico	6	–	8	.429	16	–	14	.533
Colorado State	3	–	11	.214	12	–	18	.400
Air Force	3	–	11	.214	9	–	19	.321
† 2002 Mountain West tournament winner Rankings from AP Poll

The 2001–02 San Diego State men's basketball team represented San Diego State University in the 2001–02 college basketball season. This was head coach Steve Fisher's third season at San Diego State. The Aztecs competed in the Mountain West Conference and played their home games at Cox Arena.

After finishing with a .500 record in conference play, the Aztecs elevated their play to capture the Mountain West tournament and gain an automatic bid to the NCAA tournament – the program's first appearance in 17 years. Playing as the No. 13 seed in the Midwest region, the Aztecs were beaten by No. 4 seed Illinois, 93–64, in the opening round.

== Roster ==
2001–02 San Diego State Aztecs men's basketball team
Players
Coaches

Pos.	#	Name	Height	Weight	Year	Hometown
G	0	Tommy Johnson	6 ft 4 in (1.93 m)	192 lb (87 kg)	Fr	Los Angeles, California
G	1	Deandre Moore	5 ft 10 in (1.78 m)	179 lb (81 kg)	Jr	Norwalk, California
G	4	Tony Bland	6 ft 5 in (1.96 m)	192 lb (87 kg)	Jr	Los Angeles, California
G	5	Al Faux	6 ft 2 in (1.88 m)	178 lb (81 kg)	Sr	Los Angeles, California
F	23	Randy Holcomb	6 ft 9 in (2.06 m)	225 lb (102 kg)	Sr	Chicago, Illinois

Head coach

- Steve Fisher

Assistant coach(es)

- Brian Dutcher

Legend

- (C) Team captain
- (S) Suspended
- (I) Ineligible
- (W) Walk-on
- Injured
- Current redshirt

Roster

== Schedule and results ==
Date time, TV	Rank^{#}	Opponent^{#}	Result	Record	Site (attendance) city, state
Regular season
Nov 16, 2001*; 9:15 p.m.		vs. Northern Iowa; Ford Red Raider Classic semifinal	W 71–57	1–0	United Spirit Arena; Lubbock, Texas
Nov 17, 2001*; 8:19 p.m.		at Texas Tech; Ford Red Raider Classic championship	L 71–81	1–1	United Spirit Arena; Lubbock, Texas
Nov 21, 2001*; 7:36 p.m.		Norfolk State	W 78–71	2–1	Cox Arena; San Diego, California
Nov 24, 2001*; 6:00 p.m.		at New Mexico State	L 79–94	2–2	Pan American Center; Las Cruces, New Mexico
Nov 27, 2001*; 7:36 p.m.		UC San Diego	W 98–53	3–2	Cox Arena; San Diego, California
Dec 1, 2001*; 7:00 p.m.		Cal State Northridge	W 80–70	4–2	Cox Arena; San Diego, California
Dec 4, 2001*; 4:00 p.m.		at San Diego	L 67–72	4–3	Jenny Craig Pavilion; San Diego, California
Dec 8, 2001*; 5:00 p.m.		No. 21 Fresno State	W 93–78	5–3	Cox Arena; San Diego, California
Dec 14, 2001*; 7:00 p.m.		at Hawaii	W 61–58	6–3	Stan Sheriff Center (6,443); Honolulu, Hawaii
Dec 20, 2001*; 7:00 p.m.		Eastern Washington	W 86–58	7–3	Cox Arena; San Diego, California
Dec 29, 2001*; 6:00 p.m.		at No. 1 Duke	L 79–92	7–4	Cameron Indoor Stadium; Durham, North Carolina
Dec 31, 2001*; 2:00 p.m.		Columbia	W 75–59	8–4	Cox Arena; San Diego, California
Jan 2, 2002*; 7:36 p.m.		Purdue-Fort Wayne	W 90–72	9–4	Cox Arena; San Diego, California
Jan 8, 2002*; 6:00 p.m.		at Texas A&M	W 82–79	10–4	Circle K Court; College Station, Texas
Jan 12, 2002; 4:00 p.m.		at BYU	L 64–75	10–5 (1–0)	Marriott Center; Provo, Utah
Jan 14, 2002; 7:00 p.m.		at Utah	L 70–76	10–6 (1–1)	Jon M. Huntsman Center; Salt Lake City, Utah
Jan 19, 2002; 8:00 p.m.		Colorado State	W 81–69	11–6 (2–1)	Cox Arena; San Diego, California
Jan 21, 2002; 7:00 p.m.		Wyoming	L 85–88 ^{OT}	11–7 (2–2)	Cox Arena; San Diego, California
Jan 26, 2002; 8:00 p.m.		UNLV	L 79–80 ^{OT}	11–8 (2–3)	Cox Arena; San Diego, California
Jan 29, 2002; 8:00 p.m.		Houston	W 78–66	12–8 (3–3)	Cox Arena; San Diego, California
Feb 2, 2002; 8:00 p.m.		at New Mexico	W 78–65	13–8 (4–3)	The Pit; Albuquerque, New Mexico
Feb 4, 2002; 6:00 p.m.		at Air Force	L 54–67	13–9 (4–4)	Clune Arena; Colorado Springs, Colorado
Feb 9, 2002; 3:00 p.m.		Utah	L 53–70	13–10 (4–5)	Cox Arena; San Diego, California
Feb 11, 2002; 7:42 p.m.		BYU	W 77–73	14–10 (5–5)	Cox Arena; San Diego, California
Feb 16, 2002; 7:00 p.m.		at Colorado State	W 75–63	15–10 (6–5)	Moby Arena; Fort Collins, Colorado
Feb 18, 2002; 7:00 p.m.		at Wyoming	W 68–64	16–10 (7–5)	Arena-Auditorium; Laramie, Wyoming
Feb 23, 2002; 6:00 p.m.		at UNLV	L 76–83 ^{OT}	16–11 (7–6)	Thomas & Mack Center; Las Vegas, Nevada
Feb 28, 2002; 8:00 p.m.		New Mexico	W 84–71	17–11 (8–6)	Cox Arena; San Diego, California
Mar 2, 2002; 6:00 p.m.		Air Force	W 49–47	18–11 (9–6)	Cox Arena; San Diego, California
Mountain West tournament
Mar 7, 2002*; 4:00 p.m.	(5)	vs. (4) BYU; Quarterfinals	W 62–51	19–11	Thomas & Mack Center; Las Vegas, Nevada
Mar 8, 2002*; 11:00 a.m.	(5)	vs. (1) Wyoming; Semifinals	W 70–69	20–11	Thomas & Mack Center; Las Vegas, Nevada
Mar 9, 2002*; 6:00 p.m.	(5)	at (3) UNLV; Championship game	W 78–75	21–11	Thomas & Mack Center; Las Vegas, Nevada
NCAA tournament
Mar 15, 2002*; 4:00 p.m.	(13 MW)	vs. (4 MW) No. 13 Illinois; First round	L 64–93	21–12	United Center (20,850); Chicago, Illinois
*Non-conference game. ^{#}Rankings from AP Poll. (#) Tournament seedings in parentheses.

- All times are Pacific
