= 2001–02 Utah Utes men's basketball team =

American college basketball season

2001–02 Utah Utes men's basketball

Mountain West regular season co-champions

NCAA tournament, second round
- Conference: Mountain West Conference
- Record: 21–9 (10–4 MWC)
- Head coach: Rick Majerus (13th season)
- Assistant coach: Kerry Rupp (2nd season)
- Home arena: Jon M. Huntsman Center

2001–02 Mountain West Conference men's basketball standings
	Conf.				Overall
Team	W		L	PCT	W		L	PCT
Wyoming	11	–	3	.786	22	–	9	.710
Utah	10	–	4	.714	21	–	9	.700
UNLV	9	–	5	.643	21	–	11	.656
BYU	7	–	7	.500	18	–	12	.600
San Diego State †	7	–	7	.500	21	–	12	.636
New Mexico	6	–	8	.429	16	–	14	.533
Colorado State	3	–	11	.214	12	–	18	.400
Air Force	3	–	11	.214	9	–	19	.321
† 2002 Mountain West tournament winner Rankings from AP Poll

The 2001–02 Utah Utes men's basketball team represented the University of Utah as a member of the Mountain West Conference during the 2002–03 men's basketball season. Led by head coach Rick Majerus, the Utes finished with an overall record of 25–8 (11–3 MWC) and advanced to the NCAA tournament.

== Roster ==
2001–02 Utah Utes men's basketball team
Players
Coaches

Pos.	#	Name	Height	Weight	Year	Hometown
SG	15	Nick Jacobson	6 ft 4 in (1.93 m)	206 lb (93 kg)	So	Fargo, North Dakota
F	31	Britton Johnsen	6 ft 10 in (2.08 m)	240 lb (109 kg)	Jr	Murray, Utah
C	54	Tim Frost	6 ft 10 in (2.08 m)	240 lb (109 kg)	So	Klamath Falls, Oregon

Head coach

- Rick Majerus (Marquette)

Assistant coach(es)

Legend

- (C) Team captain
- (S) Suspended
- (I) Ineligible
- (W) Walk-on
- Injured
- Current redshirt

Roster

== Schedule and results ==
Date time, TV	Rank^{#}	Opponent^{#}	Result	Record	Site city, state
Exhibition
Nov 1, 2001*; 7:00 p.m.		EA Sports	W 72–67		Jon M. Huntsman Center; Salt Lake City, Utah
Nov 7, 2001*; 7:00 p.m.		London	W 73–60		Jon M. Huntsman Center; Salt Lake City, Utah
Non-conference regular season
Nov 16, 2001*; 7:00 p.m.		St. Francis (IL)	W 74–55	1–0	Jon M. Huntsman Center; Salt Lake City, Utah
Nov 20, 2001*; 7:30 p.m.		Boise State	W 64–49	2–0	Jon M. Huntsman Center; Salt Lake City, Utah
Nov 23, 2001*; 7:00 p.m.		Utah State	L 65–78	2–1	Jon M. Huntsman Center; Salt Lake City, Utah
Nov 26, 2001*; 5:00 p.m.		at No. 22 Alabama	L 61–76	2–2	Coleman Coliseum; Tuscaloosa, Alabama
Dec 1, 2001*; 7:00 p.m.		Pepperdine	W 81–74	3–2	Jon M. Huntsman Center; Salt Lake City, Utah
Dec 4, 2001*; 8:30 p.m.		at Arizona State	L 62–71	3–3	Wells Fargo Arena; Phoenix, Arizona
Dec 8, 2001*; 7:00 p.m.		Troy State	W 87–56	4–3	Jon M. Huntsman Center; Salt Lake City, Utah
Dec 15, 2001*; 7:00 p.m.		at Weber State	W 70–59	5–3	Dee Events Center; Ogden, Utah
Dec 18, 2001*; 7:00 p.m.		Southern Utah	W 71–47	6–3	Jon M. Huntsman Center; Salt Lake City, Utah
Dec 21, 2001*; 7:00 p.m.		Idaho State	W 75–58	7–3	Jon M. Huntsman Center; Salt Lake City, Utah
Dec 29, 2001*; 1:30 p.m., ABC		Texas	W 71–61	8–3	Jon M. Huntsman Center; Salt Lake City, Utah
Jan 2, 2002*; 7:00 p.m.		Whitworth	W 63–57	9–3	Jon M. Huntsman Center; Salt Lake City, Utah
Jan 7, 2002*; 8:05 p.m.		at Saint Mary's	W 41–35	10–3	McKeon Pavilion; Moraga, California
MWC Regular Season
Jan 12, 2002; 1:00 p.m.		UNLV	W 86–63	11–3 (1–0)	Jon M. Huntsman Center; Salt Lake City, Utah
Jan 14, 2002; 7:00 p.m.		San Diego State	W 76–70	12–3 (2–0)	Jon M. Huntsman Center; Salt Lake City, Utah
Jan 19, 2002; 3:00 p.m.		at Air Force	W 63–57 ^{OT}	13–3 (3–0)	Clune Arena; Colorado Springs, Colorado
Jan 21, 2002; 7:00 p.m.		at New Mexico	W 81–51	14–3 (4–0)	The Pit; Albuquerque, New Mexico
Jan 28, 2002; 10:00 p.m.		BYU	W 71–66	15–3 (5–0)	Jon M. Huntsman Center; Salt Lake City, Utah
Feb 2, 2002; 7:00 p.m.		Colorado State	W 67–62	16–3 (6–0)	Jon M. Huntsman Center; Salt Lake City, Utah
Feb 4, 2002; 10:00 p.m.		Wyoming	L 46–54	16–4 (6–1)	Jon M. Huntsman Center; Salt Lake City, Utah
Feb 9, 2002; 4:00 p.m.		at San Diego State	W 70–53	17–4 (7–1)	Cox Arena; San Diego, California
Feb 11, 2002; 10:05 p.m.		at UNLV	L 64–72	17–5 (7–2)	Thomas & Mack Center; Las Vegas, Nevada
Feb 16, 2002; 6:00 p.m.		Air Force	W 59–51	18–5 (8–2)	Jon M. Huntsman Center; Salt Lake City, Utah
Feb 18, 2002; 10:00 p.m.		New Mexico	W 66–65	19–5 (9–2)	Jon M. Huntsman Center; Salt Lake City, Utah
Feb 23, 2002; 1:00 p.m.		at BYU	L 61–63	19–6 (9–3)	Marriott Center; Provo, Utah
Feb 28, 2002; 7:00 p.m.		at Colorado State	W 72–62	20–6 (10–3)	Moby Arena; Fort Collins, Colorado
Mar 2, 2002; 1:00 p.m.		at Wyoming	L 56–57	20–7 (10–4)	Arena-Auditorium; Laramie, Wyoming
MWC Tournament
Mar 7, 2002*; 7:00 p.m.	(2)	vs. (7) Colorado State; Quarterfinals	W 69–66	21–7	Thomas & Mack Center; Las Vegas, Nevada
Mar 8, 2002*	(2)	at (3) UNLV; Semifinals	L 70–76	21–8	Thomas & Mack Center; Las Vegas, Nevada
NCAA Tournament
Mar 14, 2002*; 8:25 p.m.	(12 S)	vs. (5 S) Indiana; First round	L 56–75	21–9	ARCO Arena; Sacramento, California
*Non-conference game. ^{#}Rankings from AP Poll. (#) Tournament seedings in parentheses. S=South. All times are in Mountain Time.
