= Brick Breeden =

American basketball coach, politician (1904–1977)

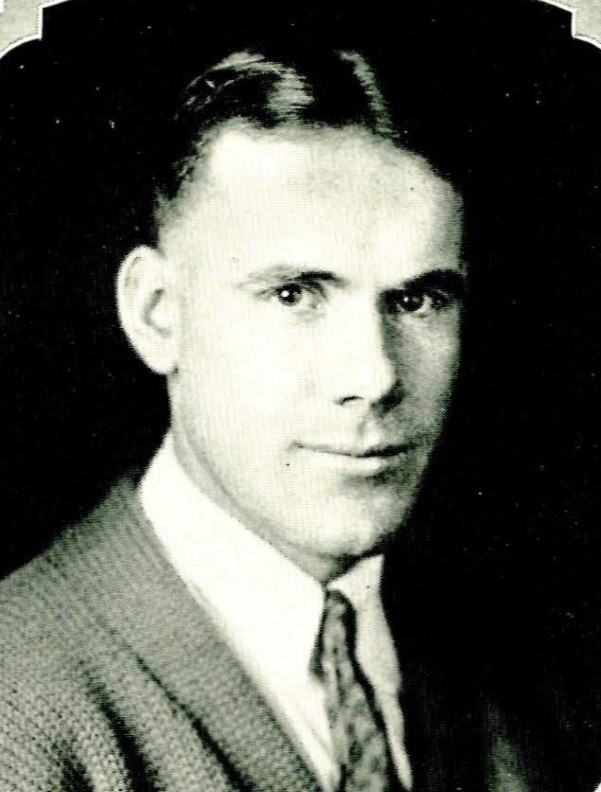
- Breeden pictured in the 1928 Montanan, Montana State yearbook

Biographical details
- Born: January 4, 1904; Oyer, Missouri, U.S.
- Died: August 13, 1977 (aged 73); Bozeman, Montana, U.S.

Playing career
- 1926–1929: Montana State

Coaching career (HC unless noted)
- 1933–1935: Montana State (assistant)
- 1935–1947: Montana State
- 1948–1954: Montana State

Administrative career (AD unless noted)
- 1944–1945: Montana State
- 1952–1955: Montana State

Head coaching record
- Overall: 283–198
- Tournaments: 0–1 (NCAA); 1–4 (NAIA)

Accomplishments and honors

Championships
- 7 RMC (1937–1938, 1940, 1947, 1950–1952); 1 RMC Western Division (1937)

John William "Brick" Breeden (January 4, 1904 – August 13, 1977) was an American college basketball coach, athletics administrator, and state legislator. He served two stints as the head basketball coach Montana State College—now known as Montana State University—from 1935 to 1947 and 1948 to 1954.

Born in Oyer, Missouri, Breeden moved to Montana with his family in 1918, and they settled in Bozeman two years later. He graduated from Gallatin County High School in 1925, and then attended Montana State College. As a star basketball player, he helped lead the Montana State Bobcats to the Helms Athletic Foundation national championship in 1929. Breeden was also student body president and a member of Sigma Chi fraternity.

He returned to the university in 1933 and was an assistant for two years. He coached Montana State to a 283–198 (.588) record and one NCAA tournament appearance, in 1951. After stepping down as head coach in 1954, he was the athletic director, then the career placement director until retirement in 1971.

Breeden was a state senator for one term (1972–1974), but did not pursue a second due to health concerns. He died on August 13, 1977, at his Bozeman home, of natural causes, at age 73. The Brick Breeden Fieldhouse at Montana State was named in his honor in 1981.

== Head coaching record ==
Record table
Season	Team	Overall	Conference	Standing	Postseason
Montana State Bobcats (Rocky Mountain Conference) (1935–1947)
1935–36	Montana State	11–8	5–7	3rd (Western)	
1936–37	Montana State	17–10	8–5	1st (Western)	
1937–38	Montana State	22–5	10–0	1st	
1938–39	Montana State	18–11	4–2	T–2nd	
1939–40	Montana State	10–16	3–1	1st	
1940–41	Montana State	13–12	5–3	2nd	
1941–42	Montana State	14–8	5–3	2nd	
1942–43	Montana State	17–5			
1943–44	No team—World War II				
1944–45	Montana State	10–14			
1945–46	Montana State	17–10	6–2	2nd	NAIA First Round
1946–47	Montana State	25–11	7–1	1st	NAIA First Round
Montana State Bobcats (Rocky Mountain Conference) (1948–1954)
1948–49	Montana State	14–15	5–3	3rd	
1949–50	Montana State	20–12	9–1	1st	
1950–51	Montana State	24–12	9–1	1st	NCAA First Round
1951–52	Montana State	22–14	8–2	T–1st	NAIA Second Round
1952–53	Montana State	11–24	6–4	3rd	
1953–54	Montana State	18–11	8–2	2nd	NAIA First Round
Montana State:		283–198 (.588)	98–37 (.726)		
Total:		283–198 (.588)			
National champion Postseason invitational champion Conference regular season champion Conference regular season and conference tournament champion Division regular season champion Division regular season and conference tournament champion Conference tournament champion
