= 2001–02 Montana State Bobcats men's basketball team =

American college basketball season

2001–02 Montana State Bobcats men's basketball

Big Sky regular season champions

NIT, first round
- Conference: Big Sky Conference
- Record: 20–10 (12–2 Big Sky)
- Head coach: Mick Durham (12th season)
- Assistant coaches: Scott Carson (8th season); Jerry Olson (8th season)
- Home arena: Worthington Arena

2001–02 Big Sky men's basketball standings
	Conf.				Overall
Team	W		L	PCT	W		L	PCT
Montana State	12	–	2	.857	20	–	10	.667
Eastern Washington	10	–	4	.714	17	–	13	.567
Weber State	8	–	6	.571	18	–	11	.621
Montana †	7	–	7	.500	16	–	15	.516
Northern Arizona	7	–	7	.500	14	–	14	.500
Portland State	6	–	8	.429	12	–	16	.429
Idaho State	3	–	11	.214	10	–	17	.370
Sacramento State	3	–	11	.214	9	–	19	.321
† Conference tournament winner

The 2001–02 Montana State Bobcats basketball team represented the Montana State University during the 2001–02 NCAA Division I men's basketball season. The Bobcats, led by twelfth-year head coach Mick Durham, played their home games at Worthington Arena and were members of the Big Sky Conference. They finished the season 20–10, 12–2 in Big Sky play to win the conference regular season. Montana State lost in the semifinals of the Big Sky Basketball tournament to eventual champions Montana. They would be selected to participate in the NIT where the Bobcats defeated Utah State in the opening round, before losing to Richmond in the first round.

== Roster ==
2001–02 Montana State Bobcats men's basketball team
Players
Coaches

Pos.	#	Name	Height	Weight	Year	Hometown
G	10	Jason Erickson	6 ft 3 in (1.91 m)	185 lb (84 kg)	So	Eagle River, Alaska
F	12	Damir Latović	6 ft 8 in (2.03 m)	235 lb (107 kg)	Jr	Belgrade, Serbia

Head coach

- Mick Durham

Assistant coach(es)

- Scott Carson
- Jerry Olson

Legend

- (C) Team captain
- (S) Suspended
- (I) Ineligible
- (W) Walk-on
- Injured
- Current redshirt

Roster

== Schedule and results ==
Date time, TV	Rank^{#}	Opponent^{#}	Result	Record	Site (attendance) city, state
Regular season
Nov 13, 2001*		at Fresno State	L 70–92	0–1	Selland Arena (7,110); Fresno, California
Nov 17, 2001*		Utah State	L 51–66	0–2	Worthington Arena (2,411); Bozeman, Montana
Nov 26, 2001*		Jamestown	W 73–58	1–2	Worthington Arena (2,311); Bozeman, Montana
Nov 30, 2001*		vs. Air Force; McCaffrey Classic	L 65–70	1–3	Selland Arena (10,220); Fresno, California
Dec 1, 2001*		vs. UC Riverside; McCaffrey Classic	W 82–72	2–3	Selland Arena (10,220); Fresno, California
Dec 4, 2001*		at Utah State	L 55–60	2–4	Dee Glen Smith Spectrum (6,496); Logan, Utah
Dec 8, 2001*		Montana State–Northern	W 77–69	3–4	Worthington Arena (1,300); Bozeman, Montana
Dec 13, 2001*		at Arizona State	L 69–72	3–5	Wells Fargo Arena (2,570); Tempe, Arizona
Dec 15, 2001*		at Wyoming	L 69–82	3–6	Arena-Auditorium (5,614); Laramie, Wyoming
Dec 22, 2001*		IPFW	W 63–59	4–6	Worthington Arena (2,433); Bozeman, Montana
Dec 29, 2001*		Hampton; Bobcat Classic	W 80–66	5–6	Worthington Arena (4,511); Bozeman, Montana
Dec 30, 2001*		San Diego; Bobcat Classic	W 68–59	6–6	Worthington Arena (4,499); Bozeman, Montana
Jan 3, 2002		at Weber State	W 64–62	7–6 (1–0)	Dee Events Center (3,058); Ogden, Utah
Jan 5, 2002*		at Portland	W 66–63	8–6	Chiles Center (1,378); Portland, Oregon
Jan 11, 2002		at Portland State	W 74–68	9–6 (2–0)	Peter W. Stott Center (1,303); Portland, Oregon
Jan 12, 2002		at Eastern Washington	W 90–81	10–6 (3–0)	Reese Court (2,433); Cheney, Washington
Jan 18, 2002		Idaho State	W 78–47	11–6 (4–0)	Worthington Arena (5,877); Bozeman, Montana
Jan 19, 2002		Weber State	W 79–68	12–6 (5–0)	Worthington Arena (5,899); Bozeman, Montana
Jan 25, 2002		at Sacramento State	L 56–78	12–7 (5–1)	Hornets Nest (1,205); Sacramento, California
Jan 26, 2002		at Northern Arizona	W 59–48	13–7 (6–1)	Walkup Skydome (2,373); Flagstaff, Arizona
Jan 31, 2002		Montana	W 76–56	14–7 (7–1)	Worthington Arena (7,101); Bozeman, Montana
Feb 8, 2002		Eastern Washington	L 62–66	14–8 (7–2)	Worthington Arena (5,577); Bozeman, Montana
Feb 9, 2002		Portland State	W 94–82	15–8 (8–2)	Worthington Arena (5,711); Bozeman, Montana
Feb 16, 2002		at Idaho State	W 63–59	16–8 (9–2)	Holt Arena (2,594); Pocatello, Idaho
Feb 22, 2002		Northern Arizona	W 62–59	17–8 (10–2)	Worthington Arena (6,011); Bozeman, Montana
Feb 23, 2002		Sacramento State	W 70–60	18–8 (11–2)	Worthington Arena (5,422); Bozeman, Montana
Mar 2, 2002		at Montana	W 75–55	19–8 (12–2)	Dahlberg Arena (6,203); Missoula, Montana
Big Sky Tournament
Mar 8, 2002*	(1)	(4) Montana; Semifinals	L 68–70	19–9	Worthington Arena; Bozeman, Montana
NIT
Mar 12, 2002*		at Utah State; Opening round	W 77–69	20–9	Dee Glen Smith Spectrum (6,754); Logan, Utah
Mar 16, 2002*		at Richmond; First round	L 48–63	20–10	Robins Center (4,384); Richmond, Virginia
*Non-conference game. ^{#}Rankings from AP Poll. (#) Tournament seedings in parentheses. All times are in Mountain Time (#) during NCAA Tournament is seed with Region.
