= 2001–02 Montana Grizzlies basketball team =

American college basketball season

2001–02 Montana Grizzlies basketball

Big Sky tournament champions

NCAA tournament, first round
- Conference: Big Sky Conference
- Record: 16–15 (7–7 Big Sky)
- Head coach: Don Holst (4th season)
- Home arena: Dahlberg Arena

2001–02 Big Sky men's basketball standings
	Conf.				Overall
Team	W		L	PCT	W		L	PCT
Montana State	12	–	2	.857	20	–	10	.667
Eastern Washington	10	–	4	.714	17	–	13	.567
Weber State	8	–	6	.571	18	–	11	.621
Montana †	7	–	7	.500	16	–	15	.516
Northern Arizona	7	–	7	.500	14	–	14	.500
Portland State	6	–	8	.429	12	–	16	.429
Idaho State	3	–	11	.214	10	–	17	.370
Sacramento State	3	–	11	.214	9	–	19	.321
† Conference tournament winner

The 2001–02 Montana Grizzlies basketball team represented the University of Montana during the 2001–02 NCAA Division I men's basketball season. The Grizzlies, led by second-year head coach Don Holst, played their home games at Dahlberg Arena and were members of the Big Sky Conference. They finished the season 16–15, 7–7 in Big Sky play to finish tied for fourth place in the conference regular season standings. Montana won the Big Sky Basketball tournament to earn the conference's automatic berth into the NCAA tournament. Playing as No. 15 seed in the Midwest region, the Grizzlies lost to No. 2 seed Oregon, 81–62, in the opening round.

== Roster ==
2001–02 Montana Grizzlies men's basketball team
Players	Coaches
Pos. / # / Name / Height / Weight / Year / Hometown; G / 20 / David Bell / 6 ft 1 in (1.85 m) / 175 lb (79 kg) / Jr / Oakland, California	Head coach: Wayne Tinkle; Assistant coach(es) Legend: (C) Team captain; (S) Suspended; (I) Ineligible; (W) Walk-on; Injured; Current redshirt; Roster

== Schedule and results ==
Date time, TV	Rank^{#}	Opponent^{#}	Result	Record	Site (attendance) city, state
Regular season
Nov 16, 2001*		Evergreen State	W 80–77	1–0	Dahlberg Arena (5,703); Missoula, Montana
Nov 18, 2001*		at Gonzaga	L 63–83	1–1	The Kennel (4,000); Spokane, Washington
Nov 20, 2001*		at Northern Iowa	L 67–87	1–2	UNI-Dome (2,548); Cedar Falls, Iowa
Nov 23, 2001*		Concordia–Irvine	W 72–48	2–2	Dahlberg Arena (2,587); Missoula, Montana
Nov 28, 2001*		Washington State	W 75–71	3–2	Dahlberg Arena (3,175); Missoula, Montana
Dec 2, 2001*		Pacific	L 64–77	3–3	Dahlberg Arena (2,814); Missoula, Montana
Dec 5, 2001*		Nevada	W 75–68	4–3	Dahlberg Arena (2,721); Missoula, Montana
Dec 8, 2001*		at Idaho	L 47–48	4–4	Cowan Spectrum (1,119); Moscow, Idaho
Dec 10, 2001*		at Colorado	L 71–84	4–5	Coors Events Center (3,322); Boulder, Colorado
Dec 20, 2001*		vs. Navy; Yahoo! Sports Invitational	W 78–61	5–5	George Q. Cannon Activities Center (482); Laie, Hawaii
Dec 21, 2001*		vs. Tulsa; Yahoo! Sports Invitational	L 82–92	5–6	George Q. Cannon Activities Center (244); Laie, Hawaii
Dec 22, 2001*		vs. New Mexico State; Yahoo! Sports Invitational	L 69–79	5–7	George Q. Cannon Activities Center (343); Laie, Hawaii
Dec 30, 2001*		Loyola Marymount	W 82–67	6–7	Dahlberg Arena (2,624); Missoula, Montana
Jan 5, 2002		at Weber State	W 80–73	7–7 (1–0)	Dee Events Center (4,721); Ogden, Utah
Jan 11, 2002		at Eastern Washington	L 46–79	7–8 (1–1)	Reese Court (2,685); Cheney, Washington
Jan 12, 2002		at Portland State	W 99–88	8–8 (2–1)	Peter W. Stott Center (1,041); Portland, Oregon
Jan 18, 2002		Weber State	L 71–90	8–9 (2–2)	Dahlberg Arena (3,657); Missoula, Montana
Jan 19, 2002		Idaho State	W 74–65	9–9 (3–2)	Dahlberg Arena (3,088); Missoula, Montana
Jan 25, 2002		at Northern Arizona	L 64–77	9–10 (3–3)	Walkup Skydome (1,775); Flagstaff, Arizona
Jan 26, 2002		at Sacramento State	W 88–78	10–10 (4–3)	Hornets Nest (1,445); Sacramento, California
Jan 31, 2002		at Montana State	L 56–76	10–11 (4–4)	Worthington Arena (7,101); Bozeman, Montana
Feb 8, 2002		Portland State	W 80–66	11–11 (5–4)	Dahlberg Arena (3,553); Missoula, Montana
Feb 9, 2002		Eastern Washington	L 78–80	11–12 (5–5)	Dahlberg Arena (4,150); Missoula, Montana
Feb 15, 2002		at Idaho State	L 64–79	11–13 (5–6)	Holt Arena (2,105); Pocatello, Idaho
Feb 22, 2002		Sacramento State	W 86–53	12–13 (6–6)	Dahlberg Arena (3,579); Missoula, Montana
Feb 23, 2002		Northern Arizona	W 70–63	13–13 (7–6)	Dahlberg Arena (3,832); Missoula, Montana
Mar 2, 2002		Montana State	L 55–75	13–14 (7–7)	Dahlberg Arena (6,203); Missoula, Montana
Big Sky Tournament
Mar 7, 2002*	(4)	vs. (5) Northern Arizona; Quarterfinals	W 82–64	14–14	Worthington Arena (2,511); Bozeman, Montana
Mar 8, 2002*	(4)	at (1) Montana State; Semifinals	W 70–68	15–14	Worthington Arena; Bozeman, Montana
Mar 9, 2002*	(4)	vs. (2) Eastern Washington; Championship Game	W 70–66	16–14	Worthington Arena (3,122); Bozeman, Montana
NCAA Tournament
Mar 14, 2002*	(15 W)	vs. (2 W) No. 11 Oregon; First round	L 62–81	16–15	ARCO Arena (15,904); Sacramento, California
*Non-conference game. ^{#}Rankings from AP Poll. (#) Tournament seedings in parentheses. All times are in Mountain Time (#) during NCAA Tournament is seed with Region.
