= 2002 Mountain West Conference men's basketball tournament =

- Classification: Division I
- Season: 2001–02
- Teams: 8
- Site: Thomas & Mack Center; Paradise, NV
- Champions: San Diego State (1st title)
- Winning coach: Steve Fisher (1st title)
- MVP: Randy Holcomb (San Diego State)

2001–02 Mountain West Conference men's basketball standings
	Conf.				Overall
Team	W		L	PCT	W		L	PCT
Wyoming	11	–	3	.786	22	–	9	.710
Utah	10	–	4	.714	21	–	9	.700
UNLV	9	–	5	.643	21	–	11	.656
BYU	7	–	7	.500	18	–	12	.600
San Diego State †	7	–	7	.500	21	–	12	.636
New Mexico	6	–	8	.429	16	–	14	.533
Colorado State	3	–	11	.214	12	–	18	.400
Air Force	3	–	11	.214	9	–	19	.321
† 2002 Mountain West tournament winner Rankings from AP Poll

The 2002 Mountain West Conference men's basketball tournament was played at the Thomas & Mack Center in Las Vegas, Nevada, from March 7–9, 2002. San Diego State upset tournament host UNLV, who returned to league tournament play following a one-year ban due to recruiting violations, 78–75 to win the MWC Tournament and the league's automatic NCAA Tournament bid. Though the league had only existed for three years, SDSU became the lowest seed (5) to win the Mountain West Conference tournament in the league's short history.

Randy Holcomb was named the tournament MVP.

== Bracket ==
Quarterfinals; March 7
1	Wyoming	69
8	Air Force	67^{OT}
4	BYU	51
5	San Diego State	62
2	Utah	69
7	Colorado State	66
3	UNLV	120
6	New Mexico	117^{2OT}

Semifinals; March 8
1	Wyoming	69
5	San Diego State	70
2	Utah	70
3	UNLV	76

Finals; March 9
5	San Diego State	78
3	UNLV	75
