= Stu Starner =

American basketball coach (1943–2024)

Biographical details
- Born: April 8, 1943; Hoffman, Minnesota, U.S.
- Died: July 17, 2024 (aged 81); Bozeman, Montana, U.S.

Playing career
- 1962–1965: Minnesota–Morris

Coaching career (HC unless noted)
- 1978–1979: Minnesota (GA)
- 1979–1981: Montana State (assistant)
- 1981–1983: Minnesota (assistant)
- 1983–1990: Montana State
- 1990–1995: UTSA

Head coaching record
- Overall: 194–153 (.559)
- Tournaments: 0–1 (NCAA Division I); 0–1 (NIT)

Accomplishments and honors

Championships
- Big Sky tournament (1986); Big Sky regular season (1987); TAAC regular season (1991); Southland regular season (1992)

Awards
- Big Sky Coach of the Year (1986)

Stuart John Starner (April 8, 1943 – July 17, 2024) was an American college basketball coach. He was an NCAA Division I head men's coach for eleven seasons for Montana State University and the University of Texas at San Antonio (UTSA).

== Career ==
A native of Hoffman, Minnesota, Starner played college basketball and football at the University of Minnesota Morris, graduating in 1965. After a successful high school coaching career in Wabasso and Richfield, Minnesota, Starner moved to the college ranks in 1978 as a graduate assistant at Minnesota. After assistant roles at Montana State in Bozeman and a second stint at Minnesota, Starner was hired in April 1983 as the head coach at Montana State. In his third season in 1986, Starner's Bobcats won the Big Sky Conference tournament as the sixth seed, gaining an automatic bid to the NCAA tournament as the only team in the field with a losing overall record. The following season, the Bobcats won the Big Sky Conference regular season title behind Conference Player of the Year Tom Domako.

In 1990, Starner took the unusual step of requesting a one-year sabbatical from his head coaching position at Montana State. His request was granted and assistant Mick Durham was named interim head coach. However, Starner surprised the school two months later by accepting the head coaching position at UTSA. Starner spent five seasons coaching the Roadrunners, Starner resigned in 1995 with an 84–58 record at the school. His teams won conference regular season championships in 1991 and 1992.

== Death ==
Starner died at age 81 on July 17, 2024, in Bozeman, Montana.

== Head coaching record ==
Record table
Season	Team	Overall	Conference	Standing	Postseason
Montana State Bobcats (Big Sky Conference) (1983–1990)
1983–84	Montana State	14–15	7–7	3rd	
1984–85	Montana State	11–17	7–7	5th	
1985–86	Montana State	14–17	6–8	6th	NCAA Division I first round
1986–87	Montana State	21–8	12–2	1st	NIT first round
1987–88	Montana State	19–11	10–6	3rd	
1988–89	Montana State	14–15	6–10	6th	
1989–90	Montana State	17–12	8–8	5th	
Montana State:		110–95 (.537)	56–48 (.538)		
UTSA Roadrunners (Trans America Athletic Conference) (1990–1991)
1990–91	UTSA	21–8	12–2	1st	
UTSA Roadrunners (Southland Conference) (1991–1995)
1991–92	UTSA	21–8	15–3	1st	
1992–93	UTSA	15–14	10–8	3rd	
1993–94	UTSA	12–15	8–10	6th	
1994–95	UTSA	15–13	11–7	2nd	
UTSA:		84–58 (.592)	44–28 (.611)		
Total:		194–153 (.559)			
National champion Postseason invitational champion Conference regular season champion Conference regular season and conference tournament champion Division regular season champion Division regular season and conference tournament champion Conference tournament champion
