= Oyer, Missouri =

Unincorporated community in Missouri, U.S.

Coordinates: 37°57′38″N 93°52′16″W

Oyer is an unincorporated community in St. Clair County, in the U.S. state of Missouri.

== History ==
A post office called Oyer was established in 1882, and remained in operation until 1935. William Oyer, an early postmaster and local merchant, gave the community his last name.
