= 1985–86 Idaho Vandals men's basketball team =

American college basketball season

1985–86 Idaho Vandals men's basketball
- Conference: Big Sky Conference
- Record: 11–18 (4–10 Big Sky)
- Head coach: Bill Trumbo (3rd season)
- Assistant coaches: Garry Mendenhall; Pat Rafferty
- Home arena: Kibbie Dome

1985–86 Big Sky Conference men's basketball standings
	Conf.				Overall
Team	W		L	PCT	W		L	PCT
Northern Arizona	9	–	5	.643	19	–	10	.655
Montana	9	–	5	.643	21	–	11	.656
Idaho State	8	–	6	.571	15	–	12	.556
Weber State	7	–	7	.500	18	–	11	.621
Nevada	7	–	7	.500	13	–	15	.464
Montana State †	6	–	8	.429	14	–	17	.452
Boise State	6	–	8	.429	12	–	16	.429
Idaho	4	–	10	.286	11	–	18	.379
† 1986 Big Sky tournament winner

The 1985–86 Idaho Vandals men's basketball team represented the University of Idaho during the 1985–86 NCAA Division I men's basketball season. Members of the Big Sky Conference, the Vandals were led by third-year head coach Bill Trumbo, and played their home games on campus at the Kibbie Dome in Moscow, Idaho.

Prior to the season, the coaches picked Idaho to finish fifth in the conference, and the media had them at sixth. The Vandals returned all but one starter from the previous year, but were 11–17 overall in the regular season and 4–10 in conference play, last in the standings for a third consecutive year. At the conference tournament in Reno, they met second-seed Montana in the quarterfinals and lost by eight points, their third consecutive loss in the Big Sky quarterfinals.

In three seasons, Trumbo's teams were 27–59 (.314) overall (9–33 (.214) in conference) and he was relieved of his duties in March, succeeded by Tim Floyd, an assistant under hall of fame head coach Don Haskins at Texas-El Paso.

== Postseason result ==
Date time, TV	Rank^{#}	Opponent^{#}	Result	Record	Site (attendance) city, state
Big Sky tournament
Thu, March 6; 7:00 pm	(7)	vs. (2) Montana; Quarterfinal	L 60–68	11–18	Lawlor Events Center (4,850); Reno, Nevada
*Non-conference game. ^{#}Rankings from AP poll. (#) Tournament seedings in parentheses. All times are in Pacific time.
