= Tom Domako =

American basketball player (born 1966)

Personal information
- Born: July 31, 1966 (age 60) Detroit, Michigan, U.S.
- Listed height: 6 ft 9 in (2.06 m)
- Listed weight: 215 lb (98 kg)

Career information
- High school: Stevenson (Livonia, Michigan)
- College: Montana State (1984–1988)
- NBA draft: 1988: undrafted
- Position: Small forward

Career history
- 1988–1989: Villeurbanne
- 1989: Cedar Rapids Silver Bullets
- 1989–1990: Columbus Horizon
- 1991–1992: Rochester Renegade

Career highlights
- Big Sky Player of the Year (1987); 2× First-team All-Big Sky (1987, 1988)

Tom Domako (born July 31, 1966) is an American former basketball player. He played professionally in the top leagues in France and Belgium, but is best known for his college career at Montana State University.

== College career ==
Domako was born in Detroit, Michigan, but lived in the Detroit suburb of Livonia. A 6'9" forward known for his shooting touch, Domako starred at Stevenson High School before choosing Montana State for college. At MSU, Domako was a sophomore starter on the 1985–86 Bobcats team that won the Big Sky Conference tournament and made the school's first NCAA tournament appearance in 35 years. As a junior, Domako led the Big Sky Conference in scoring (20.3 points per game) and was named the Big Sky Conference Player of the Year and first-team All-Big Sky. In his senior year of 1987–88, he increased his scoring average to 22.2 points per game and repeated on the all-conference first team.

Domako ended his career with 1,841 points and left as the school's third leading all-time scorer, and his 667 points in his senior season were the most in school history. In 2003, he was named to the Montana State Athletic Hall of Fame.

== Professional career ==
Following his senior season, Domako was not selected in the 1988 NBA draft. He instead signed with Villeurbanne in the French League, where he averaged 21.4 points per game in his first professional season. The next few seasons, Domako played in the Continental Basketball Association (CBA) and in Belgium before moving into private business. He spent two seasons in the CBA between the Cedar Rapids Silver Bullets, the Columbus Horizon and the Rochester Renegade. He averaged 10.4 points and 3.5 rebounds per game in 68 games over the 1989–90 and 1991–92 seasons.
