= Mick Durham =

American college basketball coach (born 1957)

Current position
- Title: Head coach
- Team: Montana State Billings
- Conference: GNAC

Biographical details
- Born: February 3, 1957 (age 69); Chicago, Illinois, U.S.

Playing career
- 1975–1980: Montana State
- Position: Point guard

Coaching career (HC unless noted)
- 1980–1982: Shepherd HS
- 1982–1990: Montana State (assistant)
- 1990–2006: Montana State
- 2008–2011: New Mexico State (assistant)
- 2011–2018: Alaska
- 2018–present: Montana State Billings

Accomplishments and honors

Championships
- 2× Big Sky regular season (1996, 2002); Big Sky tournament (1996)

Awards
- 3× Big Sky Coach of the Year (1996, 2002, 2005); GNAC Co-Coach of the Year (2013)

Mick Durham is an American college basketball coach, currently men's head coach for Montana State University Billings. He had previously been head coach at the University of Alaska Fairbanks, where he led the program for 7 seasons.

Durham was born in Chicago, but grew up in Three Forks, Montana where he led Three Forks High School to the 1974 Montana Class B State championship. He accepted a scholarship offer to nearby Montana State, where he became a three-year starter at point guard, leaving as one of the school's all-time leaders in assists and free throw percentage. Following the close of his playing career, Durham coached high school basketball at Shepherd High School in Shepherd, Montana from 1980 to 1982 before returning to Montana State as an assistant coach.

Following eight seasons as an assistant to Stu Starner, Durham moved to the head coaching position in 1990 when Starner left the post for a leave of absence. In 16 seasons leading the Bobcats, Durham compiled a record of 246–213. His teams won Big Sky Conference regular season championships in 1996 and 2002, and won the Big Sky tournament in 1996. Durham was named the conference coach of the year on three occasions (1996, 2002 and 2005). Durham resigned on March 13, 2006 following a 15–15 season.

Durham returned to coaching in 2008 as an assistant at New Mexico State University. After three seasons, he was hired as head coach at Alaska in 2011.

In March 2018, Durham accepted the head men's coaching job at Montana State University Billings, where he was 59-56 overall, 39-36 in the GNAC and was named the league's coach of the year three times.
