= Montana State Bobcats men's basketball =

Men's basketball program representing Montana State University

2026–27 Montana State Bobcats men's basketball team
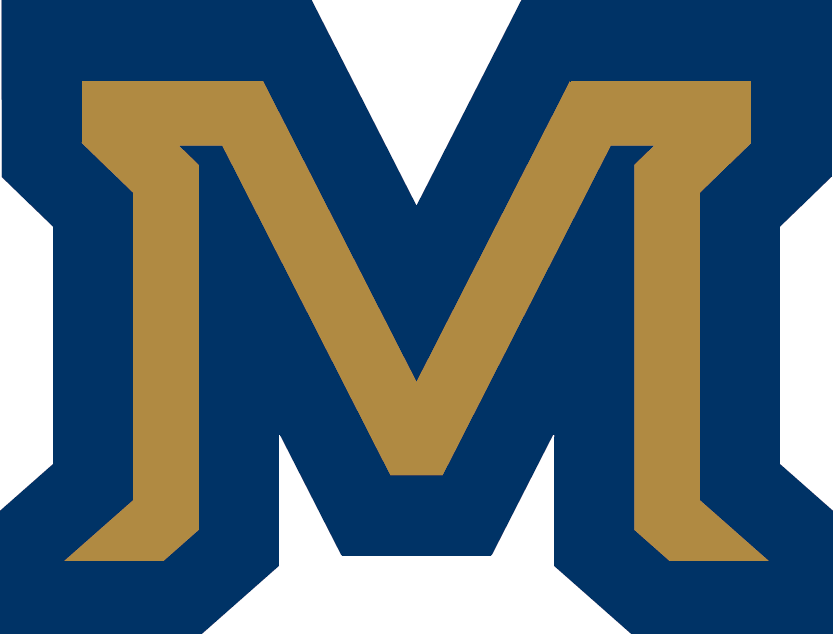
- University: Montana State University
- Head coach: Matt Logie (4th season)
- Location: Bozeman, Montana
- Arena: Worthington Arena at Brick Breeden Fieldhouse (capacity: 7,250)
- Conference: Big Sky
- Nickname: Bobcats
- Colors: Blue and gold

NCAA Division I tournament Sweet Sixteen
- 1951

NCAA Division I tournament appearances
- 1951, 1986, 1996, 2022, 2023, 2024

Pre-tournament Helms national champions
- 1929

Conference tournament champions
- 1986, 1996, 2022, 2023, 2024

Conference regular-season champions
- 1927, 1928, 1929, 1930, 1937, 1964, 1967, 1987, 1996, 2002, 2022

Uniforms
Home	Away	Alternate

The Montana State Bobcats men's basketball team represents Montana State University in the Big Sky Conference in NCAA Division I. The Bobcats play their home games on campus at Brick Breeden Fieldhouse in Bozeman, Montana. MSU has appeared in the NCAA tournament six times, most recently with three consecutive bids in 2022, 2023, and 2024.

Montana State began varsity intercollegiate competition in basketball in 1902. The Bobcats were retroactively recognized as the pre-NCAA tournament national champion for the 1928–29 season by the Premo-Porretta Power Poll and the Helms Athletic Foundation. Neither the Helms nor Premo-Porretta designations are recognized by the NCAA as official national championships, despite the NCAA referencing Helms's historical findings. Cat Thompson played for the Bobcats from 1926–30; a four-year All-American, he was the Helms Player of the Year in 1929, and was inducted into the Naismith Memorial Basketball Hall of Fame in 1962.

== Postseason ==
=== NCAA tournament results ===
The Bobcats have appeared in six NCAA Tournaments, with a combined record of 0–6.

Year	Seed	Round	Opponent	Result
1951		Sweet Sixteen	#2 Oklahoma A&M	L 46–50
1986	16 W	Round of 64	(1 W) #4 St. John's	L 74–83
1996	13 W	Round of 64	(4 W) #15 Syracuse	L 55–88
2022	14 W	Round of 64	(3 W) #12 Texas Tech	L 62–97
2023	14 E	Round of 64	(3 E) #15 Kansas State	L 65–77
2024	16 MW	First Four	(16 MW) Grambling State	L 81–88 ^{OT}

=== NIT results ===
The Bobcats have appeared in two National Invitation Tournaments, with a combined record of 1–2.

Year	Round	Opponent	Result
1987	Round of 32	Washington	L 90–98^{OT}
2002	Opening Round; Round of 32	at Utah State at Richmond	W 77–69; L 48–63

=== NAIA tournament results ===
The Bobcats appeared in seven NAIA Tournaments, with a combined record of 1–7.

Year	Round	Opponent	Result
1946	First Round	State College of Iowa	L 42–58
1947	First Round	Houston	L 58–60
1950	First Round	Portland	L 47–48
1952	First Round; Second Round	American International; Hamline	W 82–66; L 72–85
1954	First Round	Southeastern Oklahoma State	L 62–68
1955	First Round	Florida State	L 84–93
1956	First Round	Central State	L 66–67

== Season results ==
Season	Overall Record	Conference Record	Head coach
1948–49	14–15	—N/a	Brick Breeden
1949–50	20–12	—N/a	Brick Breeden
1950–51	24–12	—N/a	Brick Breeden
1951–52	22–14	—N/a	Brick Breeden
1952–53	11–24	—N/a	Brick Breeden
1953–54	18–11	—N/a	Brick Breeden
1954–55	11–16	—N/a	Wally Lemm
1955–56	15–14	—N/a	Dobbie Lambert
1956–57	12–13	—N/a	Dobbie Lambert
1957–58	18–8	—N/a	Dobbie Lambert
1958–59	12–13	—N/a	Dobbie Lambert
1959–60	11–14	—N/a	Dobbie Lambert
1960–61	10–15	—N/a	Dobbie Lambert
1961–62	10–13	—N/a	Dobbie Lambert
1962–63	13–13	—N/a	Roger Craft
1963–64	16–9	8–2	Roger Craft
1964–65	15–10	6–4	Roger Craft
1965–66	7–17	5–5	Roger Craft
1966–67	14–11	7–3	Roger Craft
1967–68	10–15	6–9	Roger Craft
1968–69	17–8	11–4	Roger Craft
1969–70	4–22	4–11	Gary Hulst
1970–71	12–13	8–6	Gary Hulst
1971–72	10–16	6–8	Gary Hulst
1972–73	17–9	9–5	Hank Anderson
1973–74	11–15	5–9	Hank Anderson
1974–75	11–15	5–9	Rich Juarez
1975–76	9–16	6–8	Rich Juarez
1976–77	9–17	6–8	Rich Juarez
1977–78	10–16	4–10	Rich Juarez
1978–79	15–11	6–8	Bruce Haroldson
1979–80	14–12	7–7	Bruce Haroldson
1980–81	16–11	11–3	Bruce Haroldson
1981–82	11–18	5–9	Bruce Haroldson
1982–83	10–17	3–11	Bruce Haroldson
1983–84	14–15	7–7	Stu Starner
1984–85	11–17	7–7	Stu Starner
1985–86	14–17	6–8	Stu Starner
1986–87	21–8	12–2	Stu Starner
1987–88	19–11	10–6	Stu Starner
1988–89	14–15	6–10	Stu Starner
1989–90	17–12	8–8	Stu Starner
1990–91	12–16	6–10	Mick Durham
1991–92	14–14	6–10	Mick Durham
1992–93	9–18	5–9	Mick Durham
1993–94	8–19	0–14	Mick Durham
1994–95	21–8	8–6	Mick Durham
1995–96	21–9	11–3	Mick Durham
1996–97	16–14	10–6	Mick Durham
1997–98	19–11	9–7	Mick Durham
1998–99	16–13	9–7	Mick Durham
1999–00	12–17	4–12	Mick Durham
2000–01	16–14	8–8	Mick Durham
2001–02	20–10	12–2	Mick Durham
2002–03	11–16	5–9	Mick Durham
2003–04	14–13	6–8	Mick Durham
2004–05	14–14	9–5	Mick Durham
2005–06	15–15	7–7	Mick Durham
2006–07	11–19	8–8	Brad Huse
2007–08	15–15	7–9	Brad Huse
2008–09	14–17	6–10	Brad Huse
2009–10	15–14	10–6	Brad Huse
2010–11	12–17	6–7	Brad Huse
2011–12	12–16	7–9	Brad Huse
2012–13	13–17	10–10	Brad Huse
2013–14	14–17	9–11	Brad Huse
2014–15	7–23	4–14	Brian Fish
2015–16	14–17	9–9	Brian Fish
2016–17	16–16	11–7	Brian Fish
2017–18	13–19	6–12	Brian Fish
2018–19	15–17	11–9	Brian Fish
2019–20	16–15	10–10	Danny Sprinkle
2020-21	13–10	8–6	Danny Sprinkle
2021–22	27–8	16–4	Danny Sprinkle
2022–23	25–10	15–3	Danny Sprinkle
Overall	1029–1032	420–430	

Eight conference wins were vacated during the 1993–94 season
