= 2018 NBA Summer League =

- League: National Basketball Association
- Sport: Basketball
- Duration: July 2–17
- Games: At least 5 games (including 3 preliminary games) for each team (as many as 8 games per team)
- Teams: Sacramento-4; Utah-4; Las Vegas-30
- TV partner(s): NBA TV & ESPN

California Classic Summer League
- Season champions: Golden State Warriors
- Runners-up: Miami Heat
- Top scorer: De'Aaron Fox

Utah Jazz Summer League
- Season champions: Utah Jazz
- Runners-up: San Antonio Spurs
- Top scorer: Derrick White

Las Vegas NBA Summer League
- Season champions: Portland Trail Blazers
- Runners-up: Los Angeles Lakers
- Top seed: Los Angeles Lakers
- Season MVP: Josh Hart (league); KJ McDaniels (championship game)

NBA Summer League seasons
- ← 2017 2019 →

The 2018 NBA Summer League consisted of three pro basketball leagues organized by the National Basketball Association (NBA): the Sacramento Kings's California Classic Summer League, Utah Jazz Summer League, and Las Vegas Summer League.

The Sacramento Kings hosted their own summer league event called the California Classic at the Golden 1 Center in Sacramento. The event was scheduled to take place before the Las Vegas Summer League began, with the teams in place for the event involving the Kings, Los Angeles Lakers, Golden State Warriors, and Miami Heat. Eight days later, the Kings confirmed that their own Summer League event (titled the California Classic Summer League) would take place July 2–5, 2018 (taking a day off to celebrate the Fourth of July), replacing the Orlando Pro Summer League. On May 14, 2018, the Kings confirmed that report.

Four teams participated in the round-robin format of the Utah Jazz Summer League from July 2 to July 5, 2018. All four teams (Utah Jazz, Atlanta Hawks, Memphis Grizzlies, and San Antonio Spurs) also participated in the Las Vegas Summer League.

The 2018 Las Vegas NBA Summer League was the official 2018 summer league of the National Basketball Association. The league was held at the Thomas and Mack Center and Cox Pavilion in Las Vegas, Nevada, on the campus of University of Nevada, Las Vegas. It began on July 6 and ended on July 17. For the first time in league history, all 30 teams participated. With every team participating, the event expanded to 82 games in 12 days. Teams competed in a tournament-style schedule in three preliminary games before seeding in a tournament; each team played at least five games and as many as eight games. The event concluded with the 2018 NBA Summer League Championship game on July 17.

== California Classic ==
In May 2018, the Sacramento Kings confirmed that they would host the inaugural California Classic from July 2–5, 2018 (taking a day off to celebrate the Fourth of July), replacing the Orlando Pro Summer League.

=== Teams ===
- Sacramento Kings
- Los Angeles Lakers
- Golden State Warriors
- Miami Heat

==== Day 1 ====
NBA TV

July 2
7:00 pm

Boxscore

Miami Heat 68, Golden State Warriors 79
Scoring by quarter: 23–19, 18–23, 18–22, 9–15
| Pts: Jones Jr. 24; Rebs: Adebayo 14; Asts: Jones Jr. 5 | Pts: Nunn 16; Rebs: Nunn 11; Asts: Magette 4 |

Golden 1 Center, Sacramento, California

NBA TV

July 2
11:00 pm

Boxscore

Los Angeles Lakers 93, Sacramento Kings 98
Scoring by quarter: 24–18, 30–30, 13–19, 26–31
| Pts: Hart, Wagner 23; Rebs: Williams 8 Asts: Rathan-Mayes 12 | Pts: Fox 23; Rebs: Fox 8 Asts: Mason III 9 |

Golden 1 Center, Sacramento, California

==== Day 2 ====
ESPN2

July 3
9:00 pm

Boxscore

Miami Heat 89, Los Angeles Lakers 74
Scoring by quarter: 31–19, 22–15, 26–16, 10–24
| Pts: Jones Jr. 21; Rebs: Adebayo 10; Asts: Macon 11 | Pts: Mykhailiuk 12; Rebs: Williams 9 Asts: Rathan-Mayes 5 |

Golden 1 Center, Sacramento, California

NBA TV

July 3
11:00 pm

Boxscore

Golden State Warriors 71, Sacramento Kings 54
Scoring by quarter: 27–11, 14–20, 17–7, 13–16
| Pts: Evans 13; Rebs: Jones 8 Asts: Bell 7 | Pts: Jackson 20; Rebs: Bagley III 7 Asts: Mason 5 |

Golden 1 Center, Sacramento, California

==== Day 3 ====
NBA TV

July 5
3:00 pm

Boxscore

Los Angeles Lakers 71, Golden State Warriors 77
Scoring by quarter: 13–20, 24–23, 16–20, 18–14
| Pts: Rathan-Mayes 14; Rebs: Wagner 13; Asts: Rathan-Mayes 8 | Pts: Derrickson 24; Rebs: Derrickson 11; Asts: four player 4 |

Golden 1 Center, Sacramento, California

NBA TV

July 5
5:00 pm

Boxscore

Miami Heat 86, Sacramento Kings 76
Scoring by quarter: 25–17, 20–17, 18–18, 23–24
| Pts: Jones Jr. 19; Rebs: Adebayo 9 Asts: Walton Jr. 7 | Pts: Jackson 26; Rebs: Giles 12; Asts: Mason III |

Golden 1 Center, Sacramento, California

==== Standings/seedings ====
| # | Team | GP | W | L | PTS | Tiebreaker Notes |
|---|---|---|---|---|---|---|
| 1 | Golden State Warriors | 3 | 3 | 0 | 25 | |
| 2 | Miami Heat | 3 | 2 | 1 | 21 | |
| 3 | Sacramento Kings | 3 | 1 | 2 | 20.5 | |
| 4 | Los Angeles Lakers | 3 | 0 | 3 | 17 | |

=== Statistical leaders ===
Points

| Player | Team | PPG |
|---|---|---|
| De'Aaron Fox | Sacramento Kings | 23.0 |
| Derrick Jones Jr. | Miami Heat | 21.3 |
| Justin Jackson | Sacramento Kings | 17.0 |
| Moritz Wagner | Los Angeles Lakers | 14.7 |
| Kendrick Nunn | Golden State Warriors | 14.0 |

Rebounds

| Player | Team | RPG |
|---|---|---|
| Bam Adebayo | Miami Heat | 11.3 |
| Moritz Wagner | Los Angeles Lakers | 8.3 |
| De'Aaron Fox | Sacramento Kings | 8.0 |
| Kendrick Nunn | Golden State Warriors | 8.0 |
| Johnathan Williams | Los Angeles Lakers | 8.0 |

Assists

| Player | Team | APG |
|---|---|---|
| Xavier Rathan-Mayes | Los Angeles Lakers | 8.3 |
| Daryl Macon | Miami Heat | 7.5 |
| Frank Mason | Sacramento Kings | 6.3 |
| De'Aaron Fox | Sacramento Kings | 6.0 |
| Derrick Walton Jr. | Miami Heat | 6.0 |

== Utah Jazz Summer League ==
Now in its fourth year, the Utah Jazz Summer League featured six games and hosted four teams. Each team played on July 2, 3 and 5. All games were played at Vivint Smart Home Arena.

=== Teams ===
- Memphis Grizzlies
- Atlanta Hawks
- San Antonio Spurs
- Utah Jazz

=== Utah Schedule ===
All times are in Mountain Daylight Time (UTC–6)

==== Day 1 ====
NBA TV

July 2
5:00 pm

Boxscore

Atlanta Hawks 88, Memphis Grizzlies 103
Scoring by quarter: 20–27, 21–20, 24–25, 23–31
| Pts: Dorsey 18; Rebs: Landale 9 Asts: Dorsey 4 | Pts: Jackson Jr. 29; Rebs: Davis 7 Asts: Goodwin 5 |

Vivint Smart Home Arena, Salt Lake City, Utah

ESPN3

July 2
7:00 pm

Boxscore

San Antonio Spurs 76, Utah Jazz 92
Scoring by quarter: 17–23, 17–28, 21–28, 21–13
| Pts: White 22; Rebs: Brimah 9 Asts: White 6 | Pts: Niang 17; Rebs: Bradley 11; Asts: Allen 7 |

Vivint Smart Home Arena, Salt Lake City, Utah

==== Day 2 ====
NBA TV

July 3
7:00 pm

Boxscore

San Antonio Spurs 103, Atlanta Hawks 81
Scoring by quarter: 32–21, 29–13, 18–23, 24–24
| Pts: White 21; Rebs: Brimah 9 Asts: White 9 | Pts: Collins 19; Rebs: Landale 8 Asts: Adams 4 |

Vivint Smart Home Arena, Salt Lake City, Utah

NBA TV

July 3
9:00 pm

Boxscore

Memphis Grizzlies 95, Utah Jazz 92
Scoring by quarter: 32–21, 27–19, 20–27, 16–25
| Pts: Jackson Jr., Selden 27; Rebs: Jackson Jr. 8 Asts: Selden 6 | Pts: Mitrou-Long 19; Rebs: Bradley 14; Asts: Mitrou-Long 8 |

Vivint Smart Home Arena, Salt Lake City, Utah

==== Day 3 ====
NBA TV

July 5
5:00 pm

Boxscore

Memphis Grizzlies 87, San Antonio Spurs 94
Scoring by quarter: 20–25, 25–26, 18–23, 24–20
| Pts: Selden 26; Rebs: Selden 7 Asts: Goodwin 6 | Pts: White 26; Rebs: Metu 9 Asts: White 6 |

Vivint Smart Home Arena, Salt Lake City, Utah

NBA TV

July 5
7:00 pm

Boxscore

Atlanta Hawks 87, Utah Jazz 94
Scoring by quarter: 16–17, 16–25, 27–22, 28–28
| Pts: Dorsey 17; Rebs: Spellman 10; Asts: Young 7 | Pts: Bradley, Kidd, Niang 15; Rebs: Bradley 12; Asts: Allen 8 |

Vivint Smart Home Arena, Salt Lake City, Utah

==== Standings/seedings ====
| # | Team | GP | W | L | PTS | Tiebreaker Notes |
|---|---|---|---|---|---|---|
| 1 | Utah Jazz | 3 | 2 | 1 | 7.5 | 1–1, +13 |
| 2 | San Antonio Spurs | 3 | 2 | 1 | 6.5 | 1–1, -9 |
| 3 | Memphis Grizzlies | 3 | 2 | 1 | 6.0 | 1–1, -4 |
| 4 | Atlanta Hawks | 3 | 0 | 3 | 4.0 | |

=== Statistical leaders ===
Points

| Player | Team | PPG |
|---|---|---|
| Derrick White | San Antonio Spurs | 23.0 |
| Wayne Selden | Memphis Grizzlies | 23.0 |
| Kobi Simmons | Memphis Grizzlies | 17.0 |
| Georges Niang | Utah Jazz | 16.7 |
| Tyler Dorsey | Atlanta Hawks | 16.3 |

Rebounds

| Player | Team | RPG |
|---|---|---|
| Tony Bradley | Utah Jazz | 12.3 |
| Chimezie Metu | San Antonio Spurs | 8.3 |
| Omari Spellman | Atlanta Hawks | 7.7 |
| Jock Landale | Atlanta Hawks | 7.7 |
| Grayson Allen | Utah Jazz | 7.0 |

Assists

| Player | Team | APG |
|---|---|---|
| Grayson Allen | Utah Jazz | 7.5 |
| Derrick White | San Antonio Spurs | 7.0 |
| Brandon Goodwin | Memphis Grizzlies | 5.3 |
| Naz Mitrou-Long | Utah Jazz | 4.7 |
| Trae Young | Atlanta Hawks | 4.3 |

== Las Vegas NBA Summer League ==
The Las Vegas NBA Summer League is the official summer league of the NBA. It is the premier summer league of the three, and it is the first year all 30 teams will be participating in. 82 games were played from July 6 to 17, 2018, across two venues, the Thomas & Mack Center and Cox Pavilion, both located in Paradise, Nevada (near Las Vegas). The Las Vegas NBA Summer League championship featured a rematch of the previous year's teams, the Los Angeles Lakers and the Portland Trail Blazers.

=== Teams ===
- Atlanta Hawks
- Boston Celtics
- Brooklyn Nets
- Chicago Bulls
- Cleveland Cavaliers
- Charlotte Hornets
- Dallas Mavericks
- Detroit Pistons
- Denver Nuggets
- Golden State Warriors
- Houston Rockets
- Indiana Pacers
- Los Angeles Clippers
- Los Angeles Lakers
- Memphis Grizzlies
- Miami Heat
- Milwaukee Bucks
- Minnesota Timberwolves
- New Orleans Pelicans
- New York Knicks
- Oklahoma City Thunder
- Orlando Magic
- Philadelphia 76ers
- Phoenix Suns
- Portland Trail Blazers
- Sacramento Kings
- San Antonio Spurs
- Toronto Raptors
- Utah Jazz
- Washington Wizards

==== Day 1 ====
NBA TV

July 6
3:00 pm

Boxscore

Houston Rockets 92, Indiana Pacers 89
Scoring by quarter: 22–26, 28–19, 20–21, 22–23
| Pts: House, Duval 20; Rebs: Hartenstein 11; Asts: House, Melton 4 | Pts: Holiday 23; Rebs: Leaf 10; Asts: Sumner, Alford, Holiday 3 |

Cox Pavilion, Paradise, Nevada

ESPNU

July 6
3:30 pm

Boxscore

Toronto Raptors 77, New Orleans Pelicans 90
Scoring by quarter: 20–25, 12–27, 19–18, 26–20
| Pts: McKinnie, Alkins12; Rebs: Anunoby 7 Asts: Miller McIntyre 5 | Pts: Bluiett 24; Rebs: Diallo 10; Asts: Carr 5 |

Thomas & Mack Center, Paradise, Nevada

NBA TV

July 6
5:00 pm

Boxscore

Brooklyn Nets 80, Orlando Magic 86
Scoring by quarter: 24–20, 10–22, 25–24, 21–20
| Pts: Dawson 20; Rebs: Web III 8 Asts: Christon 4 | Pts: Issac, Caupain 20; Rebs: Issac, Birch, Bamba 7 Asts: Briscoe 4 |

Cox Pavilion, Paradise, Nevada

ESPNU

July 6
5:30 pm

Boxscore

Oklahoma City Thunder 87, Charlotte Hornets 88
Scoring by quarter: 28–24, 22–23, 15–21, 22–20
| Pts: Thomas 24; Rebs: Hamilton 12; Asts: Hamilton 8 | Pts: Monk 23; Rebs: Hernanagomez 14; Asts: Graham 5 |

Thomas & Mack Center, Paradise, Nevada

NBA TV

July 6
7:00 pm

Boxscore

Milwaukee Bucks 90, Detroit Pistons 63
Scoring by quarter: 14–8, 25–14, 21–19, 30–22
| Pts: Wood 23; Rebs: Wood 11; Asts: Barnett 4 | Pts: Ellenson 16; Rebs: Ellenson 10; Asts: Drew II 3 |

Cox Pavilion, Paradise, Nevada

ESPN

July 6
7:30 pm

Boxscore

Boston Celtics 95, Philadelphia 76ers 89
Scoring by quarter: 23–20, 25–25, 21–18, 26–26
| Pts: Ojeleye, Yabusele 16; Rebs: Bird 8 Asts: Henry 8 | Pts: Korkmaz 40; Rebs: Miles 8 Asts: Jackson 6 |

Thomas & Mack Center, Paradise, Nevada

NBA TV

July 6
9:00 pm

Boxscore

Cleveland Cavaliers 72, Washington Wizards 59
Scoring by quarter: 22–10, 16–16, 19–15, 15–18
| Pts: Zizic 16; Rebs: Zizic 14; Asts: Zizic 5 | Pts: Robinson 14; Rebs: Harrison 6 Asts: Chiozza 5 |

Cox Pavilion, Paradise, Nevada

ESPN

July 6
9:30 pm

Boxscore

Dallas Mavericks 85, Phoenix Suns 92
Scoring by quarter: 21–20, 16–22, 17–30, 31–20
| Pts: Jones 16; Rebs: Jones 11; Asts: Smith Jr. 5 | Pts: Reed 18; Rebs: Ayton 8 Asts: Harrison 9 |

Thomas & Mack Center, Paradise, Nevada

NBA TV

July 6
11:00 pm

Boxscore

Denver Nuggets 70, Minnesota Timberwolves 69
Scoring by quarter: 18–16, 22–16, 22–9, 8–28
| Pts: Morris 15; Rebs: Williams 8 Asts: Morris 4 | Pts: Cousins 15; Rebs: Jefferson 14; Asts: Okogie 4 |

Cox Pavilion, Paradise, Nevada

ESPN

July 6
11:30 pm

Boxscore

Los Angeles Clippers 71, Golden State Warriors 77
Scoring by quarter: 17–29, 22–13, 21–16, 11–19
| Pts: Thornwell 18; Rebs: Jerrett, Upshaw 10; Asts: Gilgeous-Alexander 4 | Pts: Nunn 18; Rebs: Bell 11; Asts: Bell 5 |

Thomas & Mack Center, Paradise, Nevada

==== Day 2 ====
NBA TV

July 7
3:00 pm

Boxscore

Portland Trail Blazers 93, Utah Jazz 78
Scoring by quarter: 21–14, 19–23, 27–18, 26–23
| Pts: Baldwin 20; Rebs: Swanigan 13; Asts: Baldwin, Swanigan 5 | Pts: Allen, Bradley, Niang 16; Rebs: Malcolm Hill 7 Asts: Allen, Wilder 5 |

Cox Pavilion, Paradise, Nevada

ESPN2

July 7
3:30 pm

Boxscore

San Antonio Spurs 76, Indiana Pacers 86
Scoring by quarter: 22–17, 23–25, 8–22, 23–22
| Pts: White 19; Rebs: Blossomgame 10; Asts: White 5 | Pts: Leaf 19; Rebs: Leslie, Johnson 9 Asts: Holiday 7 |

Thomas & Mack Center, Paradise, Nevada

NBA TV

July 7
5:00 pm

Boxscore

Miami Heat 84, New Orleans Pelicans 110
Scoring by quarter: 18–21, 15–30, 27–29, 24–30
| Pts: Robinson 18; Rebs: Jones 12; Asts: Farrell 6 | Pts: Bluiett 26; Rebs: Diallo 9 Asts: Lemon Jr. 9 |

Cox Pavilion, Paradise, Nevada

ESPN

July 7
5:30 pm

Boxscore

New York Knicks 91, Atlanta Hawks 89
Scoring by quarter: 22–12, 18–33, 26–14, 25–30
| Pts: Knox II 22; Rebs: Dotson, Knox II 8 Asts: Ntilikina 5 | Pts: Collins 30; Rebs: Dorsey 14; Asts: Young 11 |

Thomas & Mack Center, Paradise, Nevada

NBA TV

July 7
7:00 pm

Boxscore

Oklahoma City Thunder 90, Brooklyn Nets 76
Scoring by quarter: 20–19, 30–13, 28–22, 12–22
| Pts: Diallo 19; Rebs: Thomas 11; Asts: Hamilton 7 | Pts: Pinson 16; Rebs: Thompson 7 Asts: McLaughlin 6 |

Cox Pavilion, Paradise, Nevada

ESPN

July 7
7:30 pm

Boxscore

Phoenix Suns 71, Sacramento Kings 63
Scoring by quarter: 16–15, 17–14, 22–10, 16–24
| Pts: Ayton 21; Rebs: Ayton 12; Asts: Harrison 5 | Pts: Giles 17; Rebs: Brown, Bagley III 7 Asts: Mason III 5 |

Thomas & Mack Center, Paradise, Nevada

NBA TV

July 7
9:00 pm

Boxscore

Detroit Pistons 70, Memphis Grizzlies 73
Scoring by quarter: 18–21, 16–18, 18–18, 18–16
| Pts: Ellenson 15; Rebs: Brown, Ellenson 7 Asts: Drew II 5 | Pts: Selden 20; Rebs: Rabb 10; Asts: Carter 4 |

Cox Pavilion, Paradise, Nevada

ESPN2

July 7
9:30 pm

Boxscore

Chicago Bulls 86, Cleveland Cavaliers 81
Scoring by quarter: 21–16, 26–23, 16–20, 23–22
| Pts: Blakeney 25; Rebs: Carter Jr. 9 Asts: Blakeney 4 | Pts: Zizic 25; Rebs: Zizic 11; Asts: Smith 4 |

Thomas & Mack Center, Paradise, Nevada

NBA TV

July 7
11:00 pm

Boxscore

Boston Celtics 69, Denver Nuggets 82
Scoring by quarter: 12–17, 17–11, 20–28, 18–24
| Pts: Bird 24; Rebs: Martin 7 Asts: Ojeleye 4 | Pts: Akoon-Purcell, Beasley 19; Rebs: Meeks 8 Asts: Morris 6 |

Cox Pavilion, Paradise, Nevada

ESPN

July 7
11:30 pm

Boxscore

Philadelphia 76ers 79, Los Angeles Lakers 96
Scoring by quarter: 19–20, 14–25, 20–21, 26–30
| Pts: Smith 16; Rebs: Miles 11; Asts: Jackson 5 | Pts: Hart 24; Rebs: Ayres, Mykhailiuk 9 Asts: Caruso 4 |

Thomas & Mack Center, Paradise, Nevada

==== Day 3 ====
NBA TV

July 8
3:00 pm

Boxscore

Minnesota Timberwolves 103, Toronto Raptors 92
Scoring by quarter: 19–17, 26–21, 26–35, 32–19
| Pts: Bates-Diop 24; Rebs: Jefferson 13; Asts: Stark 5 | Pts: Loyd 17; Rebs: Anunoby 7 Asts: McIntyre 4 |

Cox Pavilion, Paradise, Nevada

ESPN2

July 8
3:30 pm

Boxscore

Washington Wizards 90, San Antonio Spurs 95
Scoring by quarter: 15–26, 16–14, 31–31, 28–24
| Pts: Robinson 24; Rebs: Brown Jr. 12; Asts: Chiozza 11 | Pts: Blossomgame 22; Rebs: Blossomgame 9 Asts: Hanlan, Ledbetter, Metu 3 |

Thomas & Mack Center, Paradise, Nevada

NBA TV

July 8
5:00 pm

Boxscore

Charlotte Hornets 94, Miami Heat 90
Scoring by quarter: 22–26, 24–20, 21–22, 27–22
| Pts: Bacon, Hernangomez 22; Rebs: Hernangomez 10; Asts: Graham 7 | Pts: Macon 17; Rebs: Nnoko 13; Asts: Walton Jr. 6 |

Cox Pavilion, Paradise, Nevada

ESPN2

July 8
5:30 pm

Boxscore

Portland Trail Blazers 85, Atlanta Hawks 68
Scoring by quarter: 27–17, 16–17, 20–18, 22–16
| Pts: Layman 23; Rebs: Baldwin IV, Swanigan 8 Asts: Baldwin IV 10 | Pts: John Collins 18; Rebs: John Collins 9 Asts: Adams 4 |

Thomas & Mack Center, Paradise, Nevada

NBA TV

July 8
7:00 pm

Boxscore

Dallas Mavericks 81, Milwaukee Bucks 78
Scoring by quarter: 26–28, 22–22, 17–13, 16–15
| Pts: Motley 20; Rebs: Jones 9 Asts: Smith Jr. 7 | Pts: Trice II 16; Rebs: Wood 10; Asts: Quarterman, Wilson 4 |

Cox Pavilion, Paradise, Nevada

ESPN2

July 8
7:30 pm

Boxscore

Golden State Warriors 81, Houston Rockets 87
Scoring by quarter: 25–13, 25–28, 17–11, 14–35
| Pts: Derrickson 23; Rebs: Derrickson 7 Asts: Bell, Tokoto 2 | Pts: Hunter 24; Rebs: Hartenstein 7 Asts: House 5 |

Thomas & Mack Center, Paradise, Nevada

NBA TV

July 8
9:00 pm

Boxscore

Utah Jazz 90, New York Knicks 85
Scoring by quarter: 23–24, 28–19, 20–28, 19–14
| Pts: Niang 20; Rebs: Niang 8 Asts: Lyles 4 | Pts: Knox II 19; Rebs: Robinson 11; Asts: Ntilikina 6 |

Cox Pavilion, Paradise, Nevada

ESPN2

July 8
9:30 pm

Boxscore

Memphis Grizzlies 56, Orlando Magic 86
Scoring by quarter: 16–16, 9–20, 18–27, 13–23
| Pts: Simmons 15; Rebs: Davis 12; Asts: three players 2 | Pts: Isaac, Caupain 12; Rebs: Caupain 7 Asts: Caupain 5 |

Thomas & Mack Center, Paradise, Nevada

NBA TV

July 8
11:00 pm

Boxscore

Sacramento Kings 78, Los Angeles Clippers 88
Scoring by quarter: 24–18, 21–24, 21–24, 12–22
| Pts: Jackson 28; Rebs: Auguste, Gabriel 10; Asts: Mason 6 | Pts: Thornwell 22; Rebs: Delgado, Gilgeous-Alexander 8 Asts: Thornwell 4 |

Cox Pavilion, Paradise, Nevada

ESPN2

July 8
11:30 pm

Boxscore

Los Angeles Lakers 69, Chicago Bulls 60
Scoring by quarter: 18–15, 17–14, 17–14, 17–17
| Pts: Hart 19; Rebs: Wagner 14; Asts: three players tied 3 | Pts: Williams 12; Rebs: Arcidiacono 9 Asts: Arcidiacono, Trimble 3 |

Thomas & Mack Center, Paradise, Nevada

==== Day 4 ====
ESPNU

July 9
3:00 pm

Boxscore

New Orleans Pelicans 97, Detroit Pistons 105
Scoring by quarter: 22–33, 24–28, 16–21, 35–23
| Pts: Diallo 25; Rebs: Alexander 9 Asts: Lemon Jr. 7 | Pts: Ellenson 13; Rebs: Ellenson 10; Asts: Ellenson 7 |

Cox Pavilion, Paradise, Nevada

NBA TV

July 9
3:30 pm

Boxscore

Toronto Raptors 82, Oklahoma City Thunder 92
Scoring by quarter: 21–31, 24–25, 13–22, 24–14
| Pts: Anunoby 19; Rebs: Thompson 7 Asts: McIntyre 8 | Pts: Dozier, Thomas 17; Rebs: Thomas 12; Asts: Hamilton 5 |

Thomas & Mack Center, Paradise, Nevada

ESPN2

July 9
5:00 pm

Boxscore

Indiana Pacers 88, Cleveland Cavaliers 93
Scoring by quarter: 24–21, 18–26, 22–22, 24–24
| Pts: Leaf 20; Rebs: Leaf 9 Asts: Holiday 8 | Pts: Osman 25; Rebs: Lee, Osman 6 Asts: Osman 6 |

Cox Pavilion, Paradise, Nevada

NBA TV

July 9
5:30 pm

Boxscore

Washington Wizards 87, Philadelphia 76ers 75
Scoring by quarter: 22–17, 19–10, 24–28, 22–20
| Pts: Brown Jr. 23; Rebs: Bryant 12; Asts: Chiozza 11 | Pts: McCullough 20; Rebs: Bolden 9 Asts: Jackson 4 |

Thomas & Mack Center, Paradise, Nevada

ESPN2

July 9
7:00 pm

Boxscore

Charlotte Hornets 80, Boston Celtics 100
Scoring by quarter: 20–30, 16–15, 22–23, 22–32
| Pts: Bridges 20; Rebs: Hernangomez 11; Asts: Graham 6 | Pts: Bird, Uthoff 16; Rebs: Yabusele 8 Asts: Bird 5 |

Cox Pavilion, Paradise, Nevada

NBA TV

July 9
7:30 pm

Boxscore

Golden State Warriors 71, Dallas Mavericks 91
Scoring by quarter: 21–29, 10–10, 21–37, 19–15
| Pts: Magette, Nunn 10; Rebs: Omot 6 Asts: Derrickson, Magette 3 | Pts: Greene 16; Rebs: Spalding 9 Asts: Brunson 8 |

Thomas & Mack Center, Paradise, Nevada

ESPNU

July 9
9:00 pm

Boxscore

Milwaukee Bucks 83, Denver Nuggets 90
Scoring by quarter: 17–18, 28–26, 13–23, 25–23
| Pts: Brown 27; Rebs: Brown 7 Asts: Trice II 6 | Pts: Morris 20; Rebs: Morris 6 Asts: Morris 8 |

Cox Pavilion, Paradise, Nevada

NBA TV

July 9
9:30 pm

Boxscore

Orlando Magic 53, Phoenix Suns 71
Scoring by quarter: 11–20, 13–19, 20–12, 9–20
| Pts: Isaac 10; Rebs: Iwundu 8 Asts: three Player 2 | Pts: Ayton 17; Rebs: Ayton 13; Asts: Harrison 6 |

Thomas & Mack Center, Paradise, Nevada

ESPNU

July 9
11:00 pm

Boxscore

Brooklyn Nets 69, Minnesota Timberwolves 78
Scoring by quarter: 12–17, 19–14, 18–23, 20–24
| Pts: Dawson, Watanabe 14; Rebs: Allen 12; Asts: McLaughlin 5 | Pts: Terrell 13; Rebs: Jefferson 12; Asts: Okogie 4 |

Cox Pavilion, Paradise, Nevada

NBA TV

July 9
11:30 pm

Boxscore

Los Angeles Clippers 90, Houston Rockets 104
Scoring by quarter: 17–29, 25–27, 25–24, 23–24
| Pts: Gilgeous-Alexander 25; Rebs: Hunter 8 Asts: Gilgeous-Alexander 4 | Pts: Melton 26; Rebs: Melton 10; Asts: Melton 5 |

Thomas & Mack Center, Paradise, Nevada

==== Day 5 ====
NBA TV

July 10
3:00 pm

Boxscore

San Antonio Spurs 89, Portland Trail Blazers 95
Scoring by quarter: 16–22, 23–22, 22–30, 28–21
| Pts: Blossomgame, Walker IV 12; Rebs: Brimah 9 Asts: Perrantes 5 | Pts: Trent Jr. 20; Rebs: Swanigan 9 Asts: Baldwin IV 9 |

Cox Pavilion, Paradise, Nevada

ESPNU

July 10
3:30 pm

Boxscore

Utah Jazz 90, Miami Heat 98
Scoring by quarter: 18–18, 29–29, 19–30, 24–21
| Pts: Allen, Stone 17; Rebs: three Player 7 Asts: Lewis 6 | Pts: Adebayo 24; Rebs: Adebayo 9 Asts: Walton Jr. 5 |

Thomas & Mack Center, Paradise, Nevada

NBA TV

July 10
5:00 pm

Boxscore

Atlanta Hawks 101, Chicago Bulls 93
Scoring by quarter: 18–33, 29–17, 30–21, 24–22
| Pts: Young 24; Rebs: Spellman 10; Asts: Young 5 | Pts: Blakeney, Carter Jr. 23; Rebs: Carter Jr. 6 Asts: Hutchison 8 |

Cox Pavilion, Paradise, Nevada

ESPN2

July 10
5:30 pm

Boxscore

Sacramento Kings 94, Memphis Grizzlies 80
Scoring by quarter: 23–21, 19–18, 27–12, 25–29
| Pts: Jackson 20; Rebs: Giles 12; Asts: Mason III 13 | Pts: Rabb, Selden 17; Rebs: Rabb 8 Asts: Carter 6 |

Thomas & Mack Center, Paradise, Nevada

ESPN2

July 10
7:30 pm

Boxscore

Los Angeles Lakers 109, New York Knicks 92
Scoring by quarter: 24–23, 29–19, 25–36, 31–14
| Pts: Hart 27; Rebs: Rathan-Mayes 7 Asts: Caruso 10 | Pts: Knox II 29; Rebs: Trier 10; Asts: Trier 5 |

Thomas & Mack Center, Paradise, Nevada

=== Championship ===
The championship is determined by a single-elimination tournament; the top 2 teams receive a first-round bye.

Seeding criteria

Teams are seeded first by overall record, then by a tiebreaker system. Coin toss is used if the tiebreakers below fail.

1. Head-to-head result (applicable only to ties between two teams, not to multiple-team ties)
2. Quarter point system (1 point for win, .5 for tie, 0 for loss, 0 for overtime periods)
3. Point differential

First-round losers will play consolation games to determine 17th through 30th places based on the tiebreaker system stated above. Second-round losers will play consolation games to determine 9th through 16th places.

==== Standings/seedings ====
| # | Team | GP | W | L | PCT | QP | PD |
|---|---|---|---|---|---|---|---|
| 1 | Los Angeles Lakers | 3 | 3 | 0 | 1.000 | 10.5 | |
| 2 | Portland Trail Blazers | 3 | 3 | 0 | 1.000 | 8 | +38 |
| 3 | Phoenix Suns | 3 | 3 | 0 | 1.000 | 8 | +33 |
| 4 | Denver Nuggets | 3 | 3 | 0 | 1.000 | 8 | +21 |
| 5 | Houston Rockets | 3 | 3 | 0 | 1.000 | 6 | |
| 6 | Oklahoma City Thunder | 3 | 2 | 1 | .667 | 8 | |
| 7 | New Orleans Pelicans | 3 | 2 | 1 | .667 | 7 | +31 |
| 8 | Minnesota Timberwolves | 3 | 2 | 1 | .667 | 7 | +19 |
| 9 | Dallas Mavericks | 3 | 2 | 1 | .667 | 7 | +16 |
| 10 | Boston Celtics | 3 | 2 | 1 | .667 | 7 | +13 |
| 11 | Orlando Magic | 3 | 2 | 1 | .667 | 5.5 | +18 |
| 12 | Cleveland Cavaliers | 3 | 2 | 1 | .667 | 5.5 | +13 |
| 13 | Charlotte Hornets | 3 | 2 | 1 | .667 | 5 | |
| 14 | Milwaukee Bucks | 3 | 1 | 2 | .333 | 7.5 | |
| 15 | Indiana Pacers | 3 | 1 | 2 | .333 | 7 | +2 |
| 16 | Washington Wizards | 3 | 1 | 2 | .333 | 7 | -6 |
| 17 | Los Angeles Clippers | 3 | 1 | 2 | .333 | 6 | -10 |
| 18 | Atlanta Hawks | 3 | 1 | 2 | .333 | 6 | -11 |
| 19 | San Antonio Spurs | 3 | 1 | 2 | .333 | 5.5 | -11 |
| 20 | Golden State Warriors | 3 | 1 | 2 | .333 | 5.5 | -20 |
| 21 | Sacramento Kings | 3 | 1 | 2 | .333 | 5 | -4 |
| 22 | Utah Jazz | 3 | 1 | 2 | .333 | 5 | -18 |
| 23 | New York Knicks | 3 | 1 | 2 | .333 | 5 | -20 |
| 24 | Chicago Bulls | 3 | 1 | 2 | .333 | 4.5 | -12 |
| 25 | Detroit Pistons | 3 | 1 | 2 | .333 | 4.5 | -22 |
| 26 | Miami Heat | 3 | 1 | 2 | .333 | 4 | -22 |
| 27 | Memphis Grizzlies | 3 | 1 | 2 | .333 | 4 | -41 |
| 28 | Brooklyn Nets | 3 | 0 | 3 | .000 | 5 | |
| 29 | Toronto Raptors | 3 | 0 | 3 | .000 | 4 | |
| 30 | Philadelphia 76ers | 3 | 0 | 3 | .000 | 2 | |

==== Bracket ====
First round (July 11 & 12)
16 | Washington Wizards | 74
17 | Los Angeles Clippers | 89
9 | Dallas Mavericks | 83
24 | Chicago Bulls | 95
8 | Minnesota Timberwolves | 59
25 | Detroit Pistons | 64
4 | Denver Nuggets | 77
29 | Toronto Raptors | 85
13 | Charlotte Hornets | 87
20 | Golden State Warriors | 69
12 | Cleveland Cavaliers | 96
21 | Sacramento Kings | 84
5 | Houston Rockets | 109
28 | Brooklyn Nets | 102
15 | Indiana Pacers | 101
18 | Atlanta Hawks | 107
10 | Boston Celtics | 82
23 | New York Knicks | 75
7 | New Orleans Pelicans | 106
26 | Miami Heat | 110
3 | Phoenix Suns | 86
30 | Philadelphia 76ers | 88
14 | Milwaukee Bucks (OT) | 83
19 | San Antonio Spurs | 75
11 | Orlando Magic | 70
22 | Utah Jazz | 75
6 | Oklahoma City Thunder | 85
27 | Memphis Grizzlies | 92

Second round (July 12 & 14)
1 | Los Angeles Lakers | 82
17 | Los Angeles Clippers | 69
24 | Chicago Bulls | 66
25 | Detroit Pistons | 72
29 | Toronto Raptors (OT) | 84
13 | Charlotte Hornets | 81
12 | Cleveland Cavaliers | 92
5 | Houston Rockets | 87
2 | Portland Trail Blazers | 95
18 | Atlanta Hawks | 69
10 | Boston Celtics | 74
26 | Miami Heat | 72
30 | Philadelphia 76ers | 91
14 | Milwaukee Bucks | 89
22 | Utah Jazz | 86
27 | Memphis Grizzlies | 92

Quarterfinals (July 15)
1 | Los Angeles Lakers | 101
25 | Detroit Pistons | 78
29 | Toronto Raptors | 68
12 | Cleveland Cavaliers | 82
2 | Portland Trail Blazers | 95
10 | Boston Celtics | 80
30 | Philadelphia 76ers | 73
27 | Memphis Grizzlies | 82

Semifinals (July 16)
1 | Los Angeles Lakers (2OT) | 112
12 | Cleveland Cavaliers | 109
2 | Portland Trail Blazers | 97
27 | Memphis Grizzlies | 92

Championship (July 17)
1 | Los Angeles Lakers | 73
2 | Portland Trail Blazers | 91

==== Tournament schedule ====
All times are in Eastern Daylight Time (UTC−4)

===== First round =====
ESPNU

July 11
4:00 pm

Boxscore

Los Angeles Clippers 89, Washington Wizards 74
Scoring by quarter: 31–15, 19–19, 23–21, 16–19
| Pts: Upshaw 24; Rebs: Delgado 10; Asts: Gilgeous-Alexander, Thornwell 6 | Pts: Robinson 26; Rebs: Robinson 11; Asts: Chiozza 5 |

Cox Pavilion, Paradise, Nevada

NBA TV

July 11
4:30 pm

Boxscore

Sacramento Kings 84, Cleveland Cavaliers 96
Scoring by quarter: 19–24, 17–20, 22–26, 26–26
| Pts: Jackson 20; Rebs: Auguste 9 Asts: Giles 6 | Pts: Sexton 25; Rebs: Artis, White 7 Asts: Sexton 7 |

Thomas & Mack Center, Paradise, Nevada

ESPN2

July 11
6:00 pm

Boxscore

Brooklyn Nets 102, Houston Rockets 109
Scoring by quarter: 22–29, 26–23, 34–34, 20–23
| Pts: Doyle 21; Rebs: Allen 11; Asts: Doyle 6 | Pts: House 18; Rebs: House 8 Asts: Melton 4 |

Cox Pavilion, Paradise, Nevada

NBA TV

July 11
6:30 pm

Boxscore

Chicago Bulls 95, Dallas Mavericks 83
Scoring by quarter: 15–28, 27–12, 25–21, 28–22
| Pts: Blakeney 25; Rebs: Hutchison 11; Asts: Arcidiacono 7 | Pts: Collinsworth 14; Rebs: Collinsworth 10; Asts: Brunson 7 |

Thomas & Mack Center, Paradise, Nevada

ESPN2

July 11
8:00 pm

Boxscore

Detroit Pistons 64, Minnesota Timberwolves 59
Scoring by quarter: 15–11, 21–6, 11–26, 15–16
| Pts: Brown 15; Rebs: Brown 11; Asts: Brown 6 | Pts: Bates-Diop 16; Rebs: Jefferson 15; Asts: Jefferson, Terrell 2 |

Cox Pavilion, Paradise, Nevada

NBA TV

July 11
8:30 pm

Boxscore

Atlanta Hawks 107, Indiana Pacers 101
Scoring by quarter: 16–32, 24–30, 32–23, 35–16
| Pts: Dorsey 24; Rebs: Spellman 9 Asts: Young 8 | Pts: Poythress 21; Rebs: Johnson 14; Asts: Holiday 9 |

Thomas & Mack Center, Paradise, Nevada

ESPN2

July 11
10:00 pm

Boxscore

Toronto Raptors 85, Denver Nuggets 77
Scoring by quarter: 19–19, 19–25, 19–15, 28–18
| Pts: Anunoby 22; Rebs: Thompson 8 Asts: McIntyre 11 | Pts: Morris 21; Rebs: Lydon 10; Asts: Morris 7 |

Cox Pavilion, Paradise, Nevada

NBA TV

July 11
10:30 pm

Boxscore

Golden State Warriors 69, Charlotte Hornets 87
Scoring by quarter: 14–24, 20–19, 18–20, 17–24
| Pts: Derrickson 20; Rebs: Tokoto 10; Asts: Magette 8 | Pts: Bacon 19; Rebs: Hernangomez 13; Asts: Chealey 6 |

Thomas & Mack Center, Paradise, Nevada

NBA TV

July 12
4:00 pm

Boxscore

Miami Heat 110, New Orleans Pelicans 106
Scoring by quarter: 31–25, 23–28, 27–23, 29–30
| Pts: Jones 31; Rebs: Jones 8 Asts: Walton Jr. 11 | Pts: Diallo 28; Rebs: Diallo 13; Asts: Lemon Jr. 6 |

Cox Pavilion, Paradise, Nevada

ESPN2

July 12
4:30 pm

Boxscore

New York Knicks 75, Boston Celtics 82
Scoring by quarter: 16–27, 17–19, 17–19, 25–17
| Pts: Robinson, Trier 17; Rebs: Robinson 12; Asts: Trier 4 | Pts: Ojeleye 21; Rebs: Bird 10; Asts: Henry 6 |

Thomas & Mack Center, Paradise, Nevada

NBA TV

July 12
6:00 pm

Boxscore

Memphis Grizzlies 92, Oklahoma City Thunder 85
Scoring by quarter: 24–19, 24–8, 15–25, 29–33
| Pts: Crawford 21; Rebs: Carter 8 Asts: Carter 8 | Pts: Diallo 14; Rebs: Hamilton 11; Asts: Hamilton 8 |

Cox Pavilion, Paradise, Nevada

ESPN2

July 12
6:30 pm

Boxscore

Philadelphia 76ers 88, Phoenix Suns 86
Scoring by quarter: 16–20, 19–22, 28–19, 25–25
| Pts: Miles 20; Rebs: Booker 7 Asts: Booker 6 | Pts: Harrison 17; Rebs: Ayton 9 Asts: Harrison 6 |

Thomas & Mack Center, Paradise, Nevada

NBA TV

July 12
8:00 pm

Boxscore

San Antonio Spurs 75, Milwaukee Bucks 83 (OT)
Scoring by quarter: 13–18, 25–28, 20–17, 17–12, Overtime: 0–8
| Pts: Blossomgame 19; Rebs: Blossomgame, Walker IV 9 Asts: Ledbetter 4 | Pts: Wood 26; Rebs: Wood 15; Asts: Trice II 7 |

Cox Pavilion, Paradise, Nevada

NBA TV

July 12
10:00 pm

Boxscore

Utah Jazz 75, Orlando Magic 70
Scoring by quarter: 20–19, 21–10, 10–18, 24–23
| Pts: Stone 14; Rebs: Niang, Stone 11; Asts: Mitrou-Long 4 | Pts: Caupain 14; Rebs: Iwundu, Comanche 9 Asts: Caupain 5 |

Cox Pavilion, Paradise, Nevada

===== Second round =====
ESPN2

July 12
8:30 pm

Boxscore

Los Angeles Clippers 69, Los Angeles Lakers 82
Scoring by quarter: 12–19, 24–21, 12–21, 21–21
| Pts: Thornwell, Rodriguez 17; Rebs: Upshaw 8 Asts: Upshaw 4 | Pts: Josh Hart 20; Rebs: Williams 8 Asts: Caruso 7 |

Thomas & Mack Center, Paradise, Nevada

ESPN2

July 12
10:30 pm

Boxscore

Atlanta Hawks 69, Portland Trail Blazers 95
Scoring by quarter: 15–24, 26–24, 16–25, 12–22
| Pts: Spellman 20; Rebs: Kaba 8 Asts: Morris 4 | Pts: Layman, Simons 20; Rebs: Swanigan 11; Asts: Baldwin IV 8 |

Thomas & Mack Center, Paradise, Nevada

NBA TV

July 14
4:00 pm

Boxscore

Detroit Pistons 72, Chicago Bulls 66
Scoring by quarter: 13–23, 27–11, 16–11, 16–21
| Pts: Ellenson 21; Rebs: Hamilton 10; Asts: Brown 4 | Pts: Blakeney 24; Rebs: Carter Jr. 16; Asts: Arcidiacono, Hutchison 3 |

Cox Pavilion, Paradise, Nevada

ESPN2

July 14
4:30 pm

Boxscore

Cleveland Cavaliers 92, Houston Rockets 87
Scoring by quarter: 26–20, 24–30, 20–21, 22–16
| Pts: Sexton, Smith 17; Rebs: Artis 9 Asts: Sexton, Smith 3 | Pts: House 30; Rebs: Melton 10; Asts: Melton 7 |

Thomas & Mack Center, Paradise, Nevada

NBA TV

July 14
6:00 pm

Boxscore

Toronto Raptors 87, Charlotte Hornets 84 (OT)
Scoring by quarter: 17–21, 20–16, 28–24, 15–19, Overtime: 7–4
| Pts: Alkins 25; Rebs: Alkins 11; Asts: McIntyre 5 | Pts: Bacon 28; Rebs: Bridges 11; Asts: Bridges, Chealey 4 |

Cox Pavilion, Paradise, Nevada

ESPN2

July 14
6:30 pm

Boxscore

Miami Heat 72, Boston Celtics 74
Scoring by quarter: 16–19, 19–20, 15–22, 22–13
| Pts: Walton Jr. 15; Rebs: Jones 7 Asts: Walton Jr. 5 | Pts: Henry 15; Rebs: Yabusele 10; Asts: Henry 5 |

Thomas & Mack Center, Paradise, Nevada

ESPN2

July 14
8:30 pm

Boxscore

Philadelphia 76ers 91, Milwaukee Bucks 89
Scoring by quarter: 11–18, 27–21, 29–20, 24–30
| Pts: Korkmaz 19; Rebs: Bolden 8 Asts: Jackson 5 | Pts: Wood 27; Rebs: Wood 12; Asts: Brown, Trice II 3 |

Thomas & Mack Center, Paradise, Nevada

ESPN2

July 14
10:30 pm

Boxscore

Memphis Grizzlies 92, Utah Jazz 86
Scoring by quarter: 23–23, 30–31, 19–16, 20–16
| Pts: Carter 26; Rebs: Jackson Jr. 9 Asts: Carter 6 | Pts: Niang 18; Rebs: Niang 9 Asts: Mitrou-Long, Niang 5 |

Thomas & Mack Center, Paradise, Nevada

===== Consolation round =====
ESPNU

July 13
4:00 pm

Boxscore

Brooklyn Nets 79, Indiana Pacers 116
Scoring by quarter: 17–19, 24–33, 17–39, 21–25
| Pts: Davis 19; Rebs: Thompson 9 Asts: McLaughlin 5 | Pts: Wilcox 22; Rebs: Johnson 10; Asts: Hollins 9 |

Cox Pavilion, Paradise, Nevada

NBA TV

July 13
4:30 pm

Boxscore

New York Knicks 102, New Orleans Pelicans 83
Scoring by quarter: 27–18, 13–25, 32–19, 30–21
| Pts: Ochefu 22; Rebs: Robinson 12; Asts: Walker 6 | Pts: Green 23; Rebs: Willis 6 Asts: Lemon Jr. 7 |

Thomas & Mack Center, Paradise, Nevada

ESPNU

July 13
6:00 pm

Boxscore

Washington Wizards 92, Dallas Mavericks 96
Scoring by quarter: 13–29, 21–6, 28–25, 30–36
| Pts: Brown Jr. 25; Rebs: Robinson 12; Asts: Chiozza 5 | Pts: Adams, Jones 21; Rebs: Adams, Spalding 8 Asts: Collinsworth 4 |

Cox Pavilion, Paradise, Nevada

NBA TV

July 13
6:30 pm

Boxscore

San Antonio Spurs 55, Phoenix Suns 90
Scoring by quarter: 13–13, 9–29, 19–23, 14–25
| Pts: Rowan 11; Rebs: Blossomgame 6 Asts: Perrantes 4 | Pts: Green 20; Rebs: Cooley 9 Asts: Harrison 7 |

Thomas & Mack Center, Paradise, Nevada

ESPNU

July 13
8:00 pm

Boxscore

Minnesota Timberwolves 83, Denver Nuggets 71
Scoring by quarter: 26–20, 19–23, 19–12, 19–16
| Pts: Bates-Diop, Gray 14; Rebs: Jefferson 9 Asts: Cousins 6 | Pts: Williams 17; Rebs: Meeks 11; Asts: Machado 7 |

Cox Pavilion, Paradise, Nevada

NBA TV

July 13
8:30 pm

Boxscore

Orlando Magic 85, Oklahoma City Thunder 87
Scoring by quarter: 14–20, 24–27, 24–20, 23–20
| Pts: Purvis 20; Rebs: three player tied 5 Asts: Wright 5 | Pts: Burton 17; Rebs: Burton 8 Asts: Burton, Hamilton 5 |

Thomas & Mack Center, Paradise, Nevada

ESPNU

July 13
10:00 pm

Boxscore

Sacramento Kings 69, Golden State Warriors 67
Scoring by quarter: 19–14, 13–26, 18–14, 19–13
| Pts: Brown 17; Rebs: Auguste 11; Asts: Foster 5 | Pts: Nunn 14; Rebs: Tokoto, Derrickson 7 Asts: Magette 6 |

Cox Pavilion, Paradise, Nevada

NBA TV

July 13
10:30 pm

Boxscore

Atlanta Hawks 97, Los Angeles Clippers 81
Scoring by quarter: 24–21, 23–17, 20–31, 30–12
| Pts: Robinson 20; Rebs: Kaba 15; Asts: Morris 4 | Pts: Mathews 18; Rebs: Upshaw 9 Asts: Evans 7 |

Thomas & Mack Center, Paradise, Nevada

===== Quarterfinals =====
ESPN

July 15
4:00 pm

Boxscore

Detroit Pistons 78, Los Angeles Lakers 101
Scoring by quarter: 14–33, 26–22, 16–20, 22–26
| Pts: Ellenson 22; Rebs: Hamilton 7 Asts: Ellenson 5 | Pts: Mykhailiuk 19; Rebs: Ayres 10; Asts: Rathan-Mayes 7 |

Thomas & Mack Center, Paradise, Nevada

ESPN2

July 15
6:00 pm

Boxscore

Toronto Raptors 68, Cleveland Cavaliers 82
Scoring by quarter: 16–20, 23–17, 4–21, 25–24
| Pts: Boucher 18; Rebs: Boucher 8 Asts: Teague 5 | Pts: Holland 23; Rebs: White 10; Asts: Sexton 6 |

Thomas & Mack Center, Paradise, Nevada

ESPN2

July 15
8:00 pm

Boxscore

Boston Celtics 80, Portland Trail Blazers 95
Scoring by quarter: 19–27, 21–19, 23–25, 17–24
| Pts: Davis 19; Rebs: Martin 9 Asts: Henry, Conger 4 | Pts: Jenkins 25; Rebs: McDaniels, Swanigan 9 Asts: Baldwin IV 10 |

Thomas & Mack Center, Paradise, Nevada

ESPN2

July 15
10:00 pm

Boxscore

Philadelphia 76ers 73, Memphis Grizzlies 82
Scoring by quarter: 15–26, 21–23, 18–21, 19–12
| Pts: Korkmaz 18; Rebs: McCullough 7 Asts: Smith 4 | Pts: Goodwin 21; Rebs: Davis 10; Asts: Simmons 7 |

Thomas & Mack Center, Paradise, Nevada

===== Semifinals =====
ESPN2

July 16
8:30 pm

Boxscore

Cleveland Cavaliers 109, Los Angeles Lakers 112 (2OT)
Scoring by quarter: 23–28, 24–22, 24–23, 27–25, Overtime: 8–8, 3–6
| Pts: Sexton 27; Rebs: White 9 Asts: Smith 5 | Pts: Hart 37; Rebs: Hart 9 Asts: Rathan-Mayes 9 |

Thomas & Mack Center, Paradise, Nevada

ESPN2

July 16
10:30 pm

Boxscore

Memphis Grizzlies 92, Portland Trail Blazers 97
Scoring by quarter: 24–19, 20–27, 22–23, 26–28
| Pts: Goodwin 27; Rebs: Watford, Simmons 6 Asts: Carter 4 | Pts: Swanigan 21; Rebs: Swanigan 15; Asts: Baldwin IV 4 |

Thomas & Mack Center, Paradise, Nevada

===== Championship =====
ESPN

July 17
10:00 pm

Boxscore

Portland Trail Blazers 91, Los Angeles Lakers 73
Scoring by quarter: 31–19, 19–14, 21–18, 20–22
| Pts: McDaniels 17; Rebs: Swanigan 9 Asts: Baldwin IV 6 | Pts: Hart 12; Rebs: Williams 6 Asts: Caruso 4 |

Thomas & Mack Center, Paradise, Nevada

=== Final standings ===
| # | Team | GP | W | L | PCT | QP | Explanation |
|---|---|---|---|---|---|---|---|
| 1 | Portland Trail Blazers | 7 | 7 | 0 | 1.000 | 20 | Won Championship Game |
| 2 | Los Angeles Lakers | 7 | 6 | 1 | .857 | 18 | Lost Championship Game |
| 3 | Cleveland Cavaliers | 7 | 5 | 2 | .714 | 16 | Lost in Semifinals |
| 4 | Memphis Grizzlies | 7 | 4 | 3 | .571 | 12.5 | Lost in Semifinals |
| 5 | Boston Celtics | 6 | 4 | 2 | .667 | 14 | Lost in Quarterfinals |
| 6 | Detroit Pistons | 6 | 3 | 3 | .500 | 9.5 | Lost in Quarterfinals |
| 7 | Toronto Raptors | 6 | 2 | 4 | .333 | 10.5 | Lost in Quarterfinals |
| 8 | Philadelphia 76ers | 6 | 2 | 4 | .333 | 6.5 | Lost in Quarterfinals |
| 9 | Houston Rockets | 5 | 4 | 1 | .800 | 10.5 | Lost in Second Round |
| 10 | Charlotte Hornets | 5 | 3 | 2 | .600 | 10 | Lost in Second Round |
| 11 | Atlanta Hawks | 6 | 3 | 3 | .500 | 12 | Lost in Second Round |
| 12 | Milwaukee Bucks | 5 | 2 | 3 | .400 | 11.5 | Lost in Second Round |
| 13 | Chicago Bulls | 5 | 2 | 3 | .400 | 9.5 | Lost in Second Round |
| 14 | Utah Jazz | 5 | 2 | 3 | .400 | 9.5 | Lost in Second Round |
| 15 | Miami Heat | 5 | 2 | 3 | .400 | 7 | Lost in Second Round |
| 16 | Los Angeles Clippers | 6 | 2 | 4 | .333 | 11 | Lost in Second Round |
| 17 | Phoenix Suns | 5 | 4 | 1 | .800 | 14 | Lost in First Round |
| 18 | Minnesota Timberwolves | 5 | 3 | 2 | .600 | 12 | Lost in First Round |
| 19 | Oklahoma City Thunder | 5 | 3 | 2 | .600 | 12 | Lost in First Round |
| 20 | Denver Nuggets | 5 | 3 | 2 | .600 | 10.5 | Lost in First Round |
| 21 | Dallas Mavericks | 5 | 3 | 2 | .600 | 10 | Lost in First Round |
| 22 | Indiana Pacers | 5 | 2 | 3 | .400 | 13 | Lost in First Round |
| 23 | New Orleans Pelicans | 5 | 2 | 3 | .400 | 10 | Lost in First Round |
| 24 | New York Knicks | 5 | 2 | 3 | .400 | 9 | Lost in First Round |
| 25 | Orlando Magic | 5 | 2 | 3 | .400 | 8.5 | Lost in First Round |
| 26 | Sacramento Kings | 5 | 2 | 3 | .400 | 8.5 | Lost in First Round |
| 27 | Washington Wizards | 5 | 1 | 4 | .200 | 10.5 | Lost in First Round |
| 28 | San Antonio Spurs | 5 | 1 | 4 | .200 | 8 | Lost in First Round |
| 29 | Golden State Warriors | 5 | 1 | 4 | .200 | 7.5 | Lost in First Round |
| 30 | Brooklyn Nets | 5 | 0 | 5 | .000 | 6.5 | Lost in First Round |

=== Awards ===
| Award | Recipient(s) |
|---|---|
| Most Valuable Player | Josh Hart (Los Angeles Lakers) |

- MGM Resorts All-NBA Summer League First Team:
  - C Wendell Carter Jr., Chicago Bulls
  - F Christian Wood, Milwaukee Bucks
  - F Josh Hart, Los Angeles Lakers
  - G Collin Sexton, Cleveland Cavaliers
  - G Kevin Knox, New York Knicks
- MGM Resorts All-NBA Summer League Second Team:
  - C Deandre Ayton, Phoenix Suns
  - F Wade Baldwin IV, Portland Trail Blazers
  - F Jaren Jackson Jr., Memphis Grizzlies
  - G Sviatoslav Mykhailiuk, Los Angeles Lakers
  - G Trae Young, Atlanta Hawks
