= Shaquille Harrison =

American basketball player (born 1993)

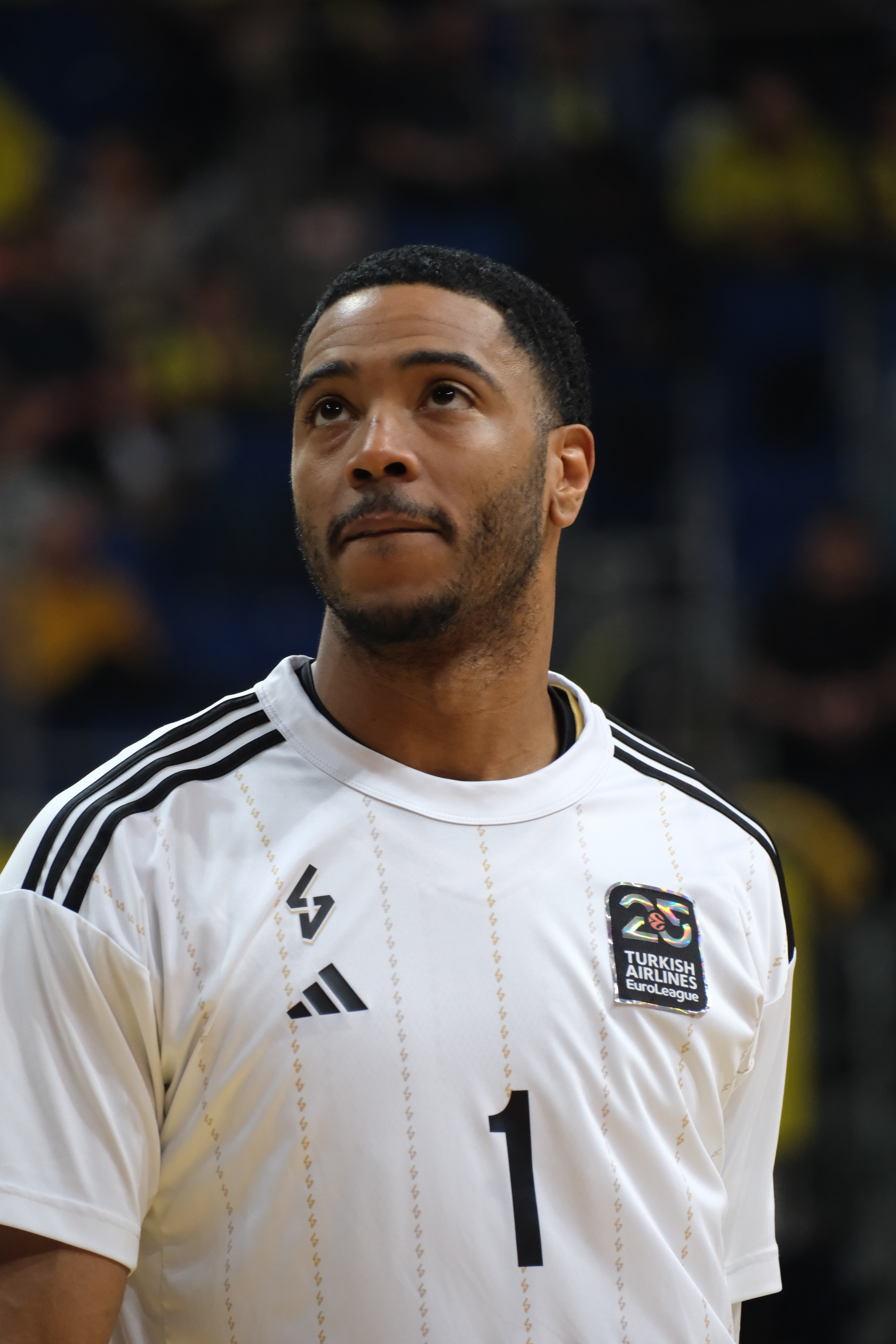
- Harrison with LDLC ASVEL in 2025

No. 3 – Trabzonspor
- Position: Point guard / shooting guard
- League: Basketbol Süper Ligi; FIBA Champions League

Personal information
- Born: October 6, 1993 (age 32) Kansas City, Missouri, U.S.
- Listed height: 6 ft 4 in (1.93 m)
- Listed weight: 195 lb (88 kg)

Career information
- High school: Lee's Summit West (Lee's Summit, Missouri)
- College: Tulsa (2012–2016)
- NBA draft: 2016: undrafted
- Playing career: 2016–present

Career history
- 2016–2018: Northern Arizona Suns
- 2018: Phoenix Suns
- 2018–2020: Chicago Bulls
- 2020–2021: Utah Jazz
- 2021: Denver Nuggets
- 2021–2022: Delaware Blue Coats
- 2021: Brooklyn Nets
- 2022–2023: South Bay Lakers
- 2023: Portland Trail Blazers
- 2023: Los Angeles Lakers
- 2023–2024: South Bay Lakers
- 2023: Memphis Grizzlies
- 2024–2026: ASVEL Basket
- 2026–present: Trabzonspor

Career highlights
- 2× NBA G League Defensive Player of the Year (2022, 2024); 3× NBA G League All-Defensive Team (2022–2024); NBA G League Steals Leader (2024); 2× Second-team All-AAC (2015, 2016)
- Stats at NBA.com
- Stats at Basketball Reference

Shaquille Harrison (born October 6, 1993) is an American professional basketball player for Trabzonspor of the Turkish Basketbol Süper Ligi (BSL) and the FIBA Champions League. He played college basketball for the Tulsa Golden Hurricane.

== College career ==
A 6 ft 4 in (1.93 m) guard from Kansas City, Missouri, Harrison played college basketball at Tulsa, turning down an offer from Kansas to play football. He was a four-year starter for the Golden Hurricane. As a senior, he was named American Athletic Conference Men's Basketball Scholar-Athlete of the Year after averaging 14.8 points, 5.5 rebounds and 4.1 assists per game while maintaining a 3.135 grade-point average. He is the only player in Tulsa history to register 1,300 points, 400 assists, and 200 steals in his career. However, he struggled with his shooting, hitting 19.5 percent of shots from behind the arc and 63 percent of his free throws.

== Professional career ==
=== Northern Arizona Suns (2016–2018) ===
After going undrafted in the 2016 NBA draft, Harrison signed with the Phoenix Suns on September 25, 2016. However, he was later waived by the Suns on October 10. On October 31, 2016, he was acquired by the Northern Arizona Suns of the NBA Development League as an affiliate player of Phoenix. In the team's season opener on November 12, 2016, Harrison scored an equal team-high 20 points in a 122–106 win over the Iowa Energy.

On July 3, 2017, Harrison rejoined the Suns for the 2017 NBA Summer League. He then returned to the Northern Arizona Suns after his stint concluded.

=== Phoenix Suns (2018) ===
On February 21, 2018, the Phoenix Suns signed Harrison to a 10-day contract. Two days later, he made his NBA debut, recording 4 assists and 4 steals in a 128–117 loss against the Los Angeles Clippers. Harrison would sign his second 10-day contract with Phoenix on March 3. The next night, he would have his first start in the NBA under a loss against the Charlotte Hornets, playing a total of 30 minutes and recording a then-season-high 14 points that night. On March 13, 2018, Harrison was signed to a multi-year deal with the Suns, guaranteeing him at least the rest of the season, if not more than that. On March 28, Harrison would record a then-season-high 17 points as well as four steals in a 111–99 loss to the Clippers. On April 10, Harrison would record his first double-double with a career-high 18 points and 10 assists in a 124–97 blowout win over the Dallas Mavericks.

On July 1, it was announced that Harrison would play with the Phoenix Suns once more, joining them for the 2018 NBA Summer League. Harrison performed as one of the team's better players throughout the event, averaging 12.2 points, 6.6 assists, 4.6 rebounds, 2.4 steals, and 0.8 blocks in 27.2 minutes per game in five games played for the team. As a result, the Suns announced they plan on making Harrison's roster spot with Phoenix at least partially guaranteed for the upcoming season. He would earn part of his guaranteed deal for the upcoming season on August 1. After the August 31 trade where the Suns moved both Brandon Knight and Marquese Chriss to the Houston Rockets for Ryan Anderson and rookie point guard De'Anthony Melton, general manager Ryan McDonough expected that Harrison would get more of a playing opportunity with the Suns either as a potential starting point guard or as a back-up point guard again if the team found another trade before the season began. However, after competing with returning point guard Isaiah Canaan and rookies Élie Okobo and De'Anthony Melton for the chance at being a starting point guard during the preseason, the Suns waived Harrison alongside Darrell Arthur on October 15.

=== Chicago Bulls (2018–2020) ===
On October 21, 2018, Harrison was signed by the Chicago Bulls, replacing the spot previously held by Ömer Aşık.

On July 6, 2019, Harrison was waived by the Bulls along with Walt Lemon Jr., but later on July 18, 2019, the Chicago Bulls signed Harrison again.

=== Utah Jazz (2020–2021) ===
On December 9, 2020, Harrison signed a contract with the Utah Jazz, but was later waived by the Jazz on February 24, 2021.

=== Denver Nuggets (2021) ===
On April 9, 2021, Harrison signed a two-way contract with the Denver Nuggets.

=== Delaware Blue Coats / Brooklyn Nets (2021–2022) ===
On September 27, 2021, Harrison signed with the Philadelphia 76ers. He was waived on October 16. Later that month, he joined the Delaware Blue Coats, the 76ers' G-League affiliate. In seven games, he averaged 19.6 points on 52.0 percent shooting from the field, 7.0 rebounds, 5.7 assists and 2.9 steals in 32.2 minutes per contest.

On December 18, 2021, Harrison signed a 10-day contract with the Brooklyn Nets and was reacquired by the Blue Coats on January 9, 2022.

On January 19, 2022, Harrison signed a 10-day contract with the Memphis Grizzlies, but did not appear in a game for the team. He returned to Delaware on January 29. On April 8, he was named NBA G League Defensive Player of the Year.

=== South Bay Lakers (2022–2023) ===
On October 8, 2022, Harrison signed with the Los Angeles Lakers. He was waived a week later. On November 3, 2022, Harrison was named to the opening night roster for the South Bay Lakers.

Harrison led the G-League in steals for the 2022 - 2023 season, recording a total of 66 steals.

=== Portland Trail Blazers (2023) ===
On March 30, 2023, Harrison signed a 10-day contract with the Portland Trail Blazers.

=== Los Angeles Lakers (2023) ===
On April 9, 2023, Harrison signed with the Los Angeles Lakers, and played in eight games in the 2023 playoffs. He was waived on June 29.

=== Return to South Bay / Memphis Grizzlies (2023) ===
On August 31, 2023, Harrison signed with the Memphis Grizzlies, but was waived on October 21, prior to opening night. On November 14, he re-signed with the South Bay Lakers.

On November 24, 2023, Harrison signed a 10-day contract with the Memphis Grizzlies and on December 5, he returned to South Bay.

On April 4, 2024, he was, once again, named NBA G League Defensive Player of the Year after leading the league in steals per game. He also led the G-League in total steals for a 2nd consecutive time, recording 97 steals for the season.

=== LDLC ASVEL (2024–2026) ===
On July 2, 2024, Harrison signed with LDLC ASVEL of the LNB Élite.

On August 13, 2025, Harrison extended his contract with the team.

=== Trabzonspor (2026–present) ===
On June 23, 2026, he signed with Trabzonspor of the Basketbol Süper Ligi (BSL).

== NBA career statistics ==
Legend
GP	Games played	GS	Games started	MPG	Minutes per game
FG%	Field goal percentage	3P%	3-point field goal percentage	FT%	Free throw percentage
RPG	Rebounds per game	APG	Assists per game	SPG	Steals per game
BPG	Blocks per game	PPG	Points per game	**Bold**	Career high

=== Regular season ===
Year	Team	GP	GS	MPG	FG%	3P%	FT%	RPG	APG	SPG	BPG	PPG
2017–18	Phoenix	23	2	16.7	.476	.231	.737	2.7	2.4	1.1	.3	6.6
2018–19	Chicago	**73**	**11**	19.6	.432	.270	.667	3.0	1.9	1.2	.4	6.5
2019–20	Chicago	43	10	11.3	.467	**.381**	.780	2.0	1.1	.8	.4	4.9
2020–21	Utah	17	0	3.3	.300	.000	**.833**	.5	.5	.1	.0	1.0
2020–21	Denver	17	0	16.3	.345	.214	.813	2.3	.9	.9	.3	3.3
2021–22	Brooklyn	2	0	11.5	.333	.000	—	2.0	1.5	.5	**.5**	2.0
2022–23	Portland	5	0	**24.0**	.417	.300	.733	**4.4**	**6.0**	**2.2**	.4	**8.8**
2023–24	Memphis	3	0	2.0	**.500**	—	—	.7	.0	.0	.3	.7
Career		183	23	15.2	.435	.281	.718	2.4	1.6	1.0	.4	5.2

=== Playoffs ===
Year	Team	GP	GS	MPG	FG%	3P%	FT%	RPG	APG	SPG	BPG	PPG
2021	Denver	**9**	0	**4.4**	**.750**	**1.000**	**.667**	**.9**	.3	**.3**	**.3**	1.0
2023	L.A. Lakers	8	0	3.5	.571	**1.000**	.500	.4	**1.1**	**.3**	.0	**1.3**
Career		17	0	4.0	.636	1.000	.600	.6	.7	.3	.2	1.1

== Personal life ==
Harrison was born to Jack and Michelle Harrison; his father died of a heart attack when he was in second grade. His younger brother, Monte Harrison, is a college football and professional baseball player.
