= Justin Holiday =

American basketball player (born 1989)

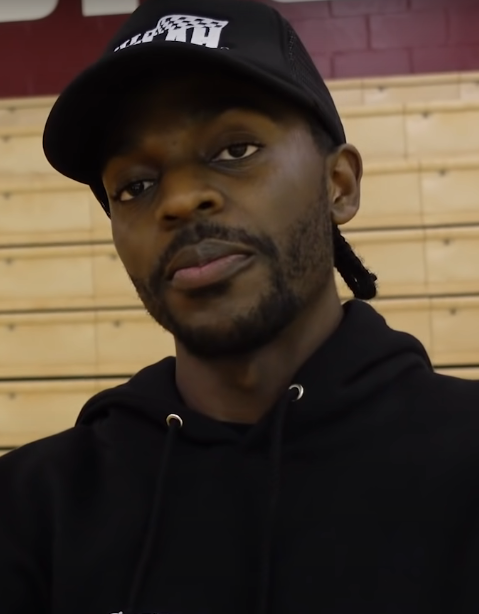
- Holiday in 2021

Free agent
- Position: Shooting guard / small forward

Personal information
- Born: April 5, 1989 (age 37) Mission Hills, California, U.S.
- Listed height: 6 ft 6 in (1.98 m)
- Listed weight: 180 lb (82 kg)

Career information
- High school: Campbell Hall (Los Angeles, California)
- College: Washington (2007–2011)
- NBA draft: 2011: undrafted
- Playing career: 2011–present

Career history
- 2011–2012: Okapi Aalstar
- 2012–2013: Idaho Stampede
- 2013: Philadelphia 76ers
- 2013–2014: Szolnoki Olajbányász
- 2014–2015: Golden State Warriors
- 2014: →Santa Cruz Warriors
- 2015–2016: Atlanta Hawks
- 2016: Chicago Bulls
- 2016–2017: New York Knicks
- 2017–2019: Chicago Bulls
- 2019: Memphis Grizzlies
- 2019–2022: Indiana Pacers
- 2022: Sacramento Kings
- 2022–2023: Atlanta Hawks
- 2023: Dallas Mavericks
- 2023–2024: Denver Nuggets
- 2025: Virtus Bologna
- 2025–2026: Guangzhou Loong Lions

Career highlights
- NBA champion (2015); All-NBA D-League Third Team (2013); NBA D-League All-Defensive Second Team (2013); Belgian Cup winner (2012); Hungarian League champion (2014); Hungarian Cup winner (2014); Pac-10 All-Defensive Team (2010)
- Stats at NBA.com
- Stats at Basketball Reference

Justin Alaric Holiday (born April 5, 1989) is an American professional basketball player who most recently played for the Guangzhou Loong Lions of the Chinese Basketball Association (CBA). He played college basketball for the Washington Huskies. Holiday went undrafted in the 2011 NBA draft, but would sign with the Philadelphia 76ers in 2013. He won an NBA championship with the Golden State Warriors in 2015. His brothers Jrue and Aaron are also NBA players.

== High school career ==
Holiday was born in Mission Hills, California. He attended Campbell Hall School in Studio City, California. As a senior, he averaged 19.1 points, 9.5 rebounds and 2.0 blocks per game as he led Campbell Hall to a 33–1 record and the state Class IV championship.

== College career ==
In his freshman season at University of Washington, Holiday played sparingly for the Huskies. In 19 games, he averaged 0.7 points in 6.6 minutes per game.

In his sophomore season, his role, playing time and production all increased. In 35 games, he averaged 2.1 points, 2.5 rebounds and 1.2 assists in 15.6 minutes per game.

In his junior season, he was named to the 2010 Pac-10 All-Defensive Team. In 34 games (21 starts), he averaged 5.9 points, 4.5 rebounds, 1.8 assists and 1.0 steals in 22.2 minutes per game.

In his senior season, he was named the Huskies' co-captain along with Isaiah Thomas. He went on to be named the Pac-10 Defensive Player of the Year by Netscouts Basketball. In 35 games (all starts), he averaged 10.5 points, 5.2 rebounds, 2.1 assists and 1.2 steals in 28.3 minutes per game.

== Professional career ==
=== Okapi (2011–2012) ===
Holiday went undrafted in the 2011 NBA draft. On August 4, 2011, he signed with Okapi Aalstar of Belgium for the 2011–12 season. He was a starter for the Belgian team alongside fellow future NBA player Chris Copeland.

=== Idaho Stampede (2012–2013) ===
In July 2012, Holiday joined the Cleveland Cavaliers for the 2012 NBA Summer League. On October 1, 2012, he signed with the Cavaliers. However, he was later waived by the Cavaliers on October 10, 2012. Two days later, he was claimed off waivers by the Portland Trail Blazers. However, he was later waived by the Trail Blazers on October 27.

On October 31, 2012, Holiday was acquired by the Idaho Stampede. On November 28, he made his debut for Idaho in a 112–98 loss to the Los Angeles D-Fenders, recording 15 points and six rebounds.

=== Philadelphia 76ers (2013) ===
On April 1, 2013, Holiday signed with the Philadelphia 76ers. Two days later, he made his debut for the 76ers in an 88–83 loss to the Charlotte Bobcats, recording two points and two rebounds in seven minutes. On April 26, Holiday was named to the All-NBA D-League Third Team and All-Defensive Second Team. In July 2013, Holiday joined the Philadelphia 76ers for the 2013 NBA Summer League. On August 14, 2013, he was waived by the 76ers. On September 30, 2013, he signed with the Utah Jazz. However, he was later waived by the Jazz on October 26, 2013, after playing seven preseason games.

=== Szolnok (2013–2014) ===
On November 21, 2013, Holiday signed with Szolnoki Olaj of Hungary for the rest of the 2013–14 season. In 19 league games for Szolnok, he averaged 12.9 points, 3.8 rebounds and 1.7 assists per game.

=== Golden State Warriors (2014–2015) ===
In July 2014, Holiday joined the Golden State Warriors for the 2014 NBA Summer League. On September 8, 2014, he signed with the Warriors. On November 14, 2014, he was assigned to the Santa Cruz Warriors. He was recalled the next day. On March 13, 2015, he scored a career-high 23 points in a loss to the Denver Nuggets. Holiday won an NBA championship with the Warriors after they defeated the Cleveland Cavaliers in the 2015 NBA Finals in six games. In 59 games for Golden State in 2014–15, he averaged 4.3 points and 1.2 rebounds per game.

=== Atlanta Hawks (2015–2016) ===
On July 9, 2015, Holiday signed a multi-year deal with the Atlanta Hawks. On October 29, he made his season debut in a 112–101 win over the New York Knicks, recording two points in 13 minutes off the bench.

=== Chicago Bulls (2016) ===
On February 18, 2016, Holiday was traded to the Chicago Bulls in a three-team trade involving the Hawks and the Utah Jazz. On March 11, 2016, he made his first start for the Bulls (sixth of career) with Derrick Rose out injured. In 38 minutes of action, he recorded a then-season-high 14 points, 4 rebounds, 1 assist, 2 steals and 2 blocks in a 118–96 loss to the Miami Heat. In the Bulls' season finale on April 13, Holiday scored a career-high 29 points in a 115–105 win over the Philadelphia 76ers.

=== New York Knicks (2016–2017) ===
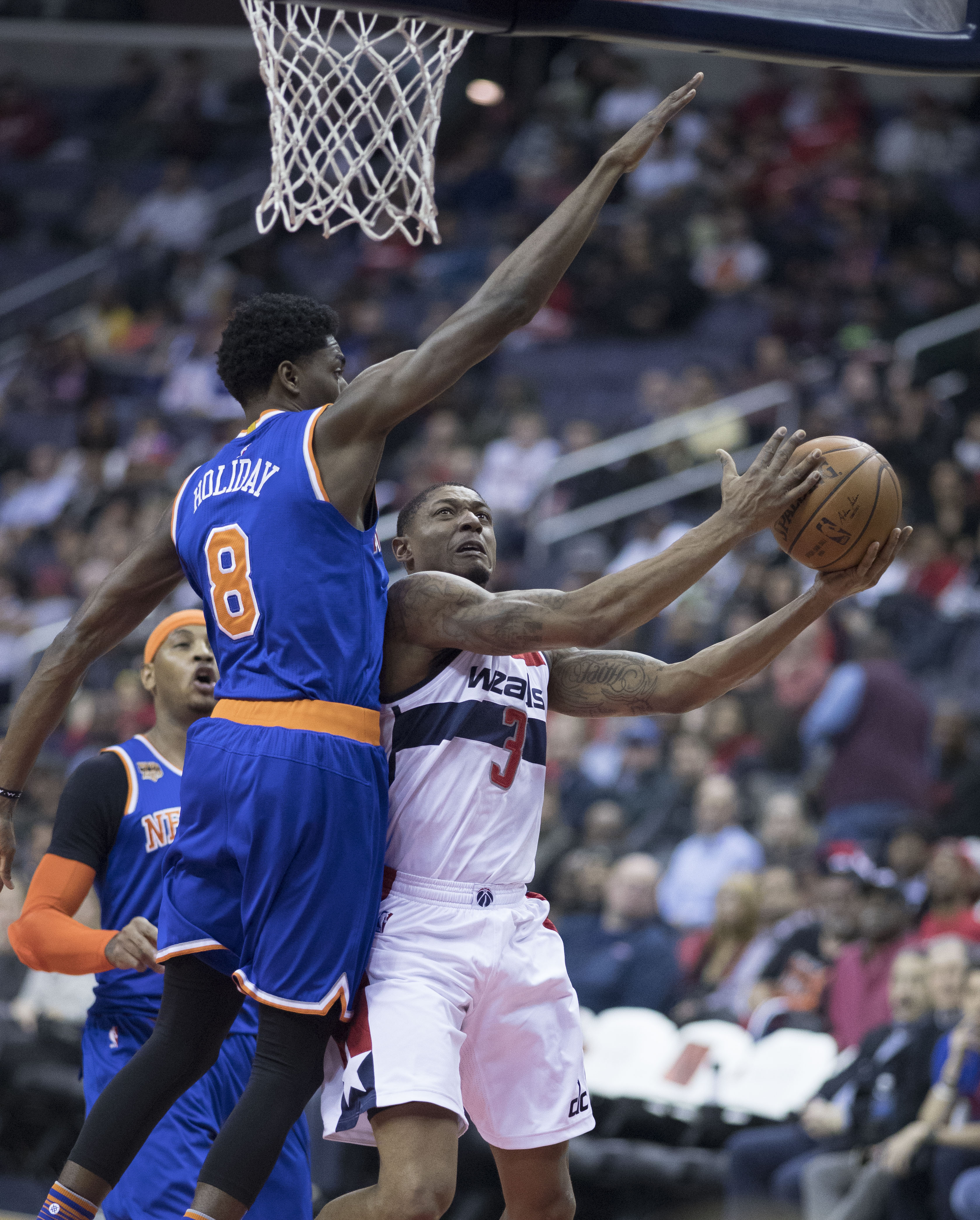
Holiday guards Bradley Beal of the Washington Wizards during a 2017 game

On June 22, 2016, Holiday was traded, along with Derrick Rose and a 2017 second-round draft pick, to the New York Knicks in exchange for José Calderón, Jerian Grant, and Robin Lopez. In the Knicks' season finale on April 12, 2017, Holiday scored a season-high 20 points against the Phoenix Suns. He appeared in all 82 games for the Knicks in 2016–17.

=== Return to Chicago (2017–2019) ===
On July 10, 2017, Holiday signed with the Chicago Bulls, returning to the franchise for a second stint. On January 3, 2018, Holiday led Chicago with 26 points in a 124–115 loss to the Toronto Raptors. On January 15, 2018, he made a career-best seven 3-pointers and scored 25 points in a 119–111 win over the Miami Heat.

On November 23, 2018, Holiday had 27 points and 13 rebounds in a 103–96 loss to the Heat. A day later, he had 14 points and 11 rebounds in a 111–96 loss to the Minnesota Timberwolves. He was 4-of-13 from three-point range, marking his 31st straight game with a made three, tying Kirk Hinrich for the longest streak in team history. He broke the record the following game. By early December, he was the only player with at least one three-pointer in every game to begin the season. His franchise-record streak ended at 43 straight games.

=== Memphis Grizzlies (2019) ===
On January 3, 2019, Holiday was traded to the Memphis Grizzlies in exchange for MarShon Brooks, Wayne Selden Jr. and two future second-round draft picks. On April 7, 2019, he scored a career-high 30 points in a 129–127 overtime loss to the Dallas Mavericks.

=== Indiana Pacers (2019–2022) ===
On July 31, 2019, Holiday signed a one-year deal worth $4.8 million with the Indiana Pacers, uniting him with his younger brother Aaron.

On November 22, 2020, Holiday re-signed with the Pacers on a three-year, $18 million contract.

=== Sacramento Kings (2022) ===
On February 8, 2022, Holiday was traded, alongside Domantas Sabonis, Jeremy Lamb and a 2023 second-round draft pick, to the Sacramento Kings in exchange for Tyrese Haliburton, Buddy Hield and Tristan Thompson. Holiday made his debut for the team the next day, recording six points, four assists and two steals in a 132–119 win over the Minnesota Timberwolves.

=== Second stint with Hawks (2022–2023) ===
On July 6, 2022, Holiday and Maurice Harkless were traded to the Atlanta Hawks in exchange for Kevin Huerter. The deal reunited Holiday with his brother Aaron, who signed with the Hawks as a free agent.

On February 9, 2023, Holiday and Frank Kaminsky and two future second-round draft picks were traded to the Houston Rockets in exchange for Bruno Fernando and Garrison Mathews. On February 13, Holiday and the Rockets reached a contract buyout agreement.

=== Dallas Mavericks (2023) ===
On February 15, 2023, Holiday signed with the Dallas Mavericks.

=== Denver Nuggets (2023–2024) ===
Holiday signed with the Denver Nuggets on July 6, 2023.

=== Virtus Segafredo Bologna (2025) ===
On February 1, 2025, Holiday signed with Virtus Segafredo Bologna of the Lega Basket Serie A.

== Career statistics ==
Legend
GP	Games played	GS	Games started	MPG	Minutes per game
FG%	Field goal percentage	3P%	3-point field goal percentage	FT%	Free throw percentage
RPG	Rebounds per game	APG	Assists per game	SPG	Steals per game
BPG	Blocks per game	PPG	Points per game	**Bold**	Career high
†	Won an NBA championship	*	Led the league

=== NBA ===
==== Regular season ====
Year	Team	GP	GS	MPG	FG%	3P%	FT%	RPG	APG	SPG	BPG	PPG
2012–13	Philadelphia	9	0	15.8	.333	.250	.750	1.6	1.7	.3	**.7**	4.7
2014–15†	Golden State	59	4	11.1	.387	.321	.822	1.2	.8	.7	.2	4.3
2015–16	Atlanta	26	1	10.1	.329	.222	.500	1.0	.4	.5	.2	2.4
2015–16	Chicago	27	4	18.9	.413	**.433**	.815	2.3	1.7	.7	.6	6.5
2016–17	New York	**82***	4	20.0	.433	.355	.825	2.7	1.2	.8	.4	7.7
2017–18	Chicago	72	**72**	31.5	.371	.359	.823	4.0	2.1	1.1	.4	**12.2**
2018–19	Chicago	**38***	38	**34.9**	.383	.359	.896	**4.4**	**2.2**	**1.8**	.6	11.6
2018–19	Memphis	**44***	39	29.1	.389	.333	**.900**	3.5	1.4	1.2	.3	9.5
2019–20	Indiana	73	6	25.0	.428	.405	.791	3.3	1.3	1.2	.6	8.3
2020–21	Indiana	72*	52	30.3	.413	.382	.788	3.6	1.7	1.0	.6	10.5
2021–22	Indiana	49	40	28.9	.415	.378	.829	2.8	1.8	.7	.4	11.0
2021–22	Sacramento	25	25	25.6	.348	.342	.762	2.2	1.5	.8	.6	8.3
2022–23	Atlanta	28	0	14.7	.384	.345	—	.8	.9	.2	.4	4.5
2022–23	Dallas	18	2	16.4	.367	.286	.625	1.8	.9	.8	.5	4.4
2023–24	Denver	58	9	14.9	**.454**	.404	.750	1.2	1.2	.6	.2	4.0
Career		680	296	23.1	.400	.365	.817	2.7	1.4	.9	.4	8.0

==== Playoffs ====
Year	Team	GP	GS	MPG	FG%	3P%	FT%	RPG	APG	SPG	BPG	PPG
2015†	Golden State	5	0	2.2	**.500**	**1.000**	—	.2	.2	.0	.0	.6
2020	Indiana	4	**2**	**32.8**	.476	.500	.333	**3.8**	**.8**	**1.5**	**1.3**	**7.3**
2024	Denver	**12**	0	12.5	.314	.379	**.500**	1.7	.3	.5	.0	2.9
Career		21	2	13.9	.379	.435	.429	1.7	.4	.6	.2	3.2

=== EuroLeague ===
Year	Team	GP	GS	MPG	FG%	3P%	FT%	RPG	APG	SPG	BPG	PPG	PIR
2024–25	Virtus Bologna	9	3	15.2	.341	.308	.500	2.1	0.6	0.7	0.2	4.1	3.1

=== College ===
Year	Team	GP	GS	MPG	FG%	3P%	FT%	RPG	APG	SPG	BPG	PPG
2007–08	Washington	19	0	6.6	.294	.000	.429	1.3	.4	.2	.3	.7
2008–09	Washington	**35**	0	15.6	.441	.250	.619	2.5	1.2	.4	.3	2.1
2009–10	Washington	34	21	22.2	.422	.333	**.800**	4.5	1.8	1.0	.6	5.9
2010–11	Washington	**35**	**35**	**28.3**	**.465**	**.359**	.772	**5.2**	**2.1**	**1.2**	**.8**	**10.5**
Career		123	56	19.6	.443	.343	.736	3.6	1.5	.8	.5	5.3

== Personal life ==
Holiday is the son of Shawn and Toya (née DeCree) Holiday. His parents both played college basketball at Arizona State, where Toya was named Pac-10 Player of the Year in 1982. All three of his siblings play basketball: younger brothers Jrue and Aaron both played for the UCLA Bruins men's team and became NBA players and younger sister Lauren played for UCLA's women's team. Additionally, he is the brother-in-law of Jrue's wife, U.S. women's national soccer team player Lauren Holiday.

Holiday became a father for the first time in November 2017, following the birth of his daughter. He would later become a father to a second daughter in April 2020.
