= Cardinal Mooney High School (Florida) =

Private school in Sarasota, Florida, United States

Location
- 4171 Fruitville Road; Sarasota, (Sarasota County), Florida 34232; United States; 27°20′18″N 82°29′8″W

Information
- Type: Private, Coeducational
- Denomination: Roman Catholic
- Established: 1959
- Founder: Father Joseph Daley
- School district: Diocese of Venice
- Superintendent: Fr. John Belmonte
- School code: 101572
- Principal: Ben Hopper
- Head of school: Ben Hopper
- Chaplain: Fr. Alex Prince
- Grades: 9–12
- Colors: Red and Gold
- Sports: Yes
- Mascot: Cougar
- Team name: Cougars
- Accreditation: Southern Association of Colleges and Schools
- Affiliation: Roman Catholic
- Athletic Director: Rafael Fernandez
- Website: cmhs-sarasota.org

Cardinal Mooney High School is a private, Roman Catholic high school in Sarasota, Florida. It is located in the Roman Catholic Diocese of Venice in Florida.

== History ==
Cardinal Mooney was established in 1959 as a Catholic high school in the Sarasota-Manatee area. The school was named after Edward Cardinal Mooney, former Cardinal of the Roman Catholic Archdiocese of Detroit who had died in 1958. Father Joseph Daley founded Cardinal Mooney High School in 1959 under the instruction of Archbishop Joseph P. Hurley, D.D., of St. Augustine. It is one of several schools set up following Archbishop Hurley's policy of increasing the number of educational institutions in the Diocese of St. Augustine, which was divided in 1984 to include the Diocese of Venice.

== Student body ==
Students in and from surrounding counties make up the majority of the school population. Enrollment is open to incoming ninth grade and transfer students from any school irrespective of religious affiliation. Community service, the Gospel faith, academics, elective offerings, and AP level instruction represent the foundation of the school's curriculum. After-school, extracurricular athletic, and club opportunities serve to educate the "whole child."

== Athletics ==
In 2025, the school won its third state championship in football.

== Notable alumni ==
- Antonio Blakeney (born 1996), basketball shooting guard in the Israeli Basketball Premier League; former NBA player
- Joe Gruters (born 1977), member of the Florida Senate representing the 23rd District and Republican National Committee chair
- Ryan Jackson (born 1971), former MLB player (Florida Marlins, Seattle Mariners, Detroit Tigers)
