= 2018–19 Chicago Bulls season =

NBA professional basketball team season

- Head coach: Fred Hoiberg (fired); Jim Boylen
- President: Michael Reinsdorf
- General manager: Gar Forman
- Owners: Jerry Reinsdorf
- Arena: United Center

Results
- Record: 22–60 (.268)
- Place: Division: 4th (Central); Conference: 13th (Eastern)
- Playoff finish: Did not qualify
- Stats at Basketball Reference

Local media
- Television: NBC Sports Chicago; WGN
- Radio: WLS; WSCR

The 2018–19 Chicago Bulls season was the 53rd season of the franchise in the National Basketball Association (NBA).

On December 3, 2018, the Bulls fired Fred Hoiberg and replaced him with his assistant Jim Boylen.

This season also produced the Bulls' highest-scoring game in franchise history, recording 168 points on March 1, 2019, in a quadruple overtime 168–161 win over the Atlanta Hawks. It broke a team record previously set in the 1983–84 season. It was also the third-highest scoring game in NBA history, as well as the third game where both teams scoring broke through the 160 point barrier in the same game.

== Draft picks ==
Round	Pick	Player	Position	Nationality	College / Club
1	7	Wendell Carter Jr.	C	United States	Duke
1	22	Chandler Hutchison	SG	United States	Boise State

The Bulls entered the draft with two first-round picks: their own (7th pick) and an additional selection (22nd pick) acquired from the New Orleans Pelicans in the Nikola Mirotić trade. They did not have a second-round pick, having traded their own to the Oklahoma City Thunder in 2017; that pick was eventually held by the New York Knicks.

== Roster ==
2018–19 Chicago Bulls roster
Players

Pos.	No.	Player	Height	Weight	DOB	From
G	20	Rawle Alkins (TW)	6 ft 5 in (1.96 m)	225 lb (102 kg)	1997-10-29	Arizona
G	51	Ryan Arcidiacono	6 ft 3 in (1.91 m)	200 lb (91 kg)	1994-03-26	Villanova
G	9	Antonio Blakeney	6 ft 4 in (1.93 m)	192 lb (87 kg)	1996-10-04	LSU
C	34	Wendell Carter (injured)	6 ft 10 in (2.08 m)	255 lb (116 kg)	1999-04-16	Duke
G	32	Kris Dunn	6 ft 4 in (1.93 m)	205 lb (93 kg)	1994-03-18	Providence
C	6	Cristiano Felício	6 ft 11 in (2.11 m)	280 lb (127 kg)	1992-07-07	CCSE Prep (CA)
G	3	Shaquille Harrison	6 ft 4 in (1.93 m)	190 lb (86 kg)	1993-10-06	Tulsa
G	15	Chandler Hutchison (injured)	6 ft 7 in (2.01 m)	197 lb (89 kg)	1996-04-26	Boise State
G	8	Zach LaVine	6 ft 5 in (1.96 m)	200 lb (91 kg)	1995-03-10	UCLA
G	25	Walt Lemon	6 ft 3 in (1.91 m)	180 lb (82 kg)	1992-07-26	Bradley
C	42	Robin Lopez	7 ft 0 in (2.13 m)	275 lb (125 kg)	1988-04-01	Stanford
G/F	7	Timothé Luwawu-Cabarrot	6 ft 7 in (2.01 m)	210 lb (95 kg)	1995-05-09	France
F	24	Lauri Markkanen	7 ft 0 in (2.13 m)	240 lb (109 kg)	1997-05-22	Arizona
G/F	22	Otto Porter	6 ft 8 in (2.03 m)	198 lb (90 kg)	1993-06-03	Georgetown
G	44	Brandon Sampson (TW)	6 ft 5 in (1.96 m)	184 lb (83 kg)	1997-05-01	LSU
F	41	JaKarr Sampson	6 ft 9 in (2.06 m)	215 lb (98 kg)	1993-02-20	St. John's
G/F	14	Wayne Selden	6 ft 5 in (1.96 m)	230 lb (104 kg)	1994-09-30	Kansas
G	45	Denzel Valentine (injured)	6 ft 6 in (1.98 m)	210 lb (95 kg)	1993-11-16	Michigan State

Coaches
Head coach
- Jim Boylen
Assistant(s)
- Dean Cooper
- Nate Loenser
- Pete Myers
- Karen Stack Umlauf
- Shawn Respert (Player Development)
- Jeff Tanaka (trainer)

Legend
- (DP) Unsigned draft pick
- (FA) Free agent
- (S) Suspended
- (GL) On assignment to G League affiliate
- (TW) Two-way affiliate player
- Injured

Roster
Updated: March 31, 2019

== Standings ==
=== Division ===
Central Division	W	L	PCT	GB	Home	Road	Div	GP
z – Milwaukee Bucks	60	22	.732	–	33‍–‍8	27‍–‍14	14–2	82
x – Indiana Pacers	48	34	.585	12.0	29‍–‍12	19‍–‍22	11–5	82
x – Detroit Pistons	41	41	.500	19.0	26‍–‍15	15‍–‍26	8–8	82
Chicago Bulls	22	60	.268	38.0	9‍–‍32	13‍–‍28	3–13	82
Cleveland Cavaliers	19	63	.232	41.0	13‍–‍28	6‍–‍35	4–12	82

=== Conference ===
Eastern Conference
#	Team	W	L	PCT	GB	GP
1	z – Milwaukee Bucks *	60	22	.732	–	82
2	y – Toronto Raptors *	58	24	.707	2.0	82
3	x – Philadelphia 76ers	51	31	.622	9.0	82
4	x – Boston Celtics	49	33	.598	11.0	82
5	x – Indiana Pacers	48	34	.585	12.0	82
6	x – Brooklyn Nets	42	40	.512	18.0	82
7	y – Orlando Magic *	42	40	.512	18.0	82
8	x – Detroit Pistons	41	41	.500	19.0	82
9	Charlotte Hornets	39	43	.476	21.0	82
10	Miami Heat	39	43	.476	21.0	82
11	Washington Wizards	32	50	.390	28.0	82
12	Atlanta Hawks	29	53	.354	31.0	82
13	Chicago Bulls	22	60	.268	38.0	82
14	Cleveland Cavaliers	19	63	.232	41.0	82
15	New York Knicks	17	65	.207	43.0	82

== Game log ==
=== Preseason ===
2018 preseason game log
Total: 2–3 (Home: 2–1; Road: 0–2)
Preseason: 2–3 (home: 2–1; road: 0–2)

Game	Date	Team	Score	High points	High rebounds	High assists	Location Attendance	Record
1	September 30	New Orleans	W 128–116	Blakeney, LaVine, Portis (21)	Dunn, Parker (8)	Payne (7)	United Center; 17,861	1–0
2	October 3	@ Milwaukee	L 82–116	Portis (17)	Blakeney (8)	Blakeney (6)	Fiserv Forum; 15,107	1–1
3	October 8	@ Charlotte	L 104–110	LaVine (26)	Parker (11)	Carter Jr. (5)	Spectrum Center; 8,487	1–2
4	October 10	Indiana	W 104–89	LaVine, Holiday (22)	Portis, Parker, Payne (6)	Dunn (7)	United Center; 17,162	2–2
5	October 12	Denver	L 93–98	Parker (19)	Carter Jr. (9)	Blakeney (5)	United Center; 18,973	2–3

2018–19 season schedule

=== Regular season ===
2018–19 game log
Total: 22–60 (Home: 9–32; Road: 13–28)
October: 2–6 (home: 1–3; road: 1–3)

Game	Date	Team	Score	High points	High rebounds	High assists	Location Attendance	Record
1	October 18	@ Philadelphia	108–127	Zach LaVine (30)	Bobby Portis (11)	Ryan Arcidiacono (8)	Wells Fargo Center; 20,302	0–1
2	October 20	Detroit	116–118	Zach LaVine (33)	Bobby Portis (14)	Ryan Arcidiacono (7)	United Center; 21,289	0–2
3	October 22	@ Dallas	109–115	Zach LaVine (34)	Wendell Carter Jr. (9)	Kris Dunn (7)	American Airlines Center; 19,291	0–3
4	October 24	Charlotte	112–110	Zach LaVine (32)	Jabari Parker (9)	Zach LaVine (5)	United Center; 19,170	1–3
5	October 26	@ Charlotte	106–135	Zach LaVine (20)	Hutchison, Felicio (7)	LaVine, Arcidiacono (4)	Spectrum Center; 15,220	1–4
6	October 27	@ Atlanta	97–85	Zach LaVine (27)	Zach LaVine (11)	Ryan Arcidiacono (7)	State Farm Arena; 15,549	2–4
7	October 29	Golden State	124–149	LaVine, Blakeney (21)	Jabari Parker (9)	Jabari Parker (6)	United Center; 21,076	2–5
8	October 31	Denver	107–108 (OT)	Zach LaVine (28)	Jabari Parker (9)	LaVine, Blakeney (7)	United Center; 19,027	2–6

November : 3–12 (home: 2–6; road: 1–6)

Game	Date	Team	Score	High points	High rebounds	High assists	Location Attendance	Record
9	November 2	Indiana	105–107	Antonio Blakeney (22)	Cristiano Felicio (9)	Cameron Payne (8)	United Center; 19,704	2–7
10	November 3	Houston	88–96	Zach LaVine (21)	Wendell Carter Jr. (13)	LaVine, Blakeney (4)	United Center; 20,505	2–8
11	November 5	@ New York	116–115 (2OT)	Zach LaVine (41)	Wendell Carter Jr. (13)	Zach LaVine (4)	Madison Square Garden; 19,812	3–8
12	November 7	@ New Orleans	98–107	Zach LaVine (22)	Jabari Parker (13)	Zach LaVine (4)	Smoothie King Center; 15,514	3–9
13	November 10	Cleveland	99–98	Zach LaVine (24)	Justin Holiday (7)	Zach LaVine (5)	United Center; 21,506	4–9
14	November 12	Dallas	98–103	Zach LaVine (26)	Wendell Carter Jr. (10)	Ryan Arcidiacono (6)	United Center; 19,012	4–10
15	November 14	@ Boston	82–111	Shaquille Harrison (16)	Zach LaVine (9)	Holiday, LaVine (4)	TD Garden; 18,624	4–11
16	November 16	@ Milwaukee	104–123	Jabari Parker (21)	Jabari Parker (8)	Holiday, LaVine, Carter Jr. (4)	Fiserv Forum; 17,341	4–12
17	November 17	Toronto	83–122	Antonio Blakeney (13)	Jabari Parker (6)	Shaquille Harrison (6)	United Center; 21,263	4–13
18	November 21	Phoenix	124–116	Zach LaVine (29)	Jabari Parker (13)	Jabari Parker (8)	United Center; 19,014	5–13
19	November 23	Miami	96–103	Justin Holiday (27)	Justin Holiday (13)	Zach LaVine (9)	United Center; 20,935	5–14
20	November 24	@ Minnesota	96–111	Zach LaVine (28)	Justin Holiday (11)	Justin Holiday (5)	Target Center; 17,119	5–15
21	November 26	San Antonio	107–108	Zach LaVine (28)	Jabari Parker (10)	Zach LaVine (7)	United Center; 19,006	5–16
22	November 28	@ Milwaukee	113–116	LaVine, Parker (24)	Zach LaVine (9)	Zach LaVine (7)	Fiserv Forum; 16,660	5–17
23	November 30	@ Detroit	88–107	Wendell Carter Jr. (28)	Wendell Carter Jr. (7)	Justin Holiday (7)	Little Caesars Arena; 15,372	5–18

December : 5–9 (home: 2–4; road: 3–5)

Game	Date	Team	Score	High points	High rebounds	High assists	Location Attendance	Record
24	December 1	@ Houston	105–121	Zach LaVine (29)	Jabari Parker (12)	Cameron Payne (6)	Toyota Center; 18,055	5–19
25	December 4	@ Indiana	90–96	Lauri Markkanen (21)	Wendell Carter Jr. (13)	Zach LaVine (9)	Bankers Life Fieldhouse; 16,446	5–20
26	December 7	Oklahoma City	114–112	Zach LaVine (25)	Markkanen, Parker (7)	Zach LaVine (7)	United Center; 19,842	6–20
27	December 8	Boston	77–133	Shaquille Harrison (20)	Cristiano Felicio (7)	Arcidiacono, Parker, Payne (3)	United Center; 20,923	6–21
28	December 10	Sacramento	89–108	Zach LaVine (19)	Portis, Carter Jr. (8)	Kris Dunn (6)	United Center; 18,164	6–22
29	December 13	@ Orlando	91–97	Zach LaVine (23)	Bobby Portis (7)	Arcidiacono, LaVine (5)	Mexico City Arena; 20,201	6–23
30	December 15	@ San Antonio	98–93	Kris Dunn (24)	Markkanen, Dunn, Holiday (7)	Ryan Arcidiacono (6)	AT&T Center; 18,354	7–23
31	December 17	@ Oklahoma City	96–121	Lauri Markkanen (16)	Lauri Markkanen (15)	Kris Dunn (7)	Chesapeake Energy Arena; 18,203	7–24
32	December 19	Brooklyn	93–96	Kris Dunn (24)	Bobby Portis (11)	Kris Dunn (6)	United Center; 18,065	7–25
33	December 21	Orlando	90–80	Lauri Markkanen (32)	Justin Holiday (10)	Ryan Arcidiacono (8)	United Center; 20,436	8–25
34	December 23	@ Cleveland	112–92	Lauri Markkanen (31)	Kris Dunn (8)	Ryan Arcidiacono (8)	Quicken Loans Arena; 19,432	9–25
35	December 26	Minnesota	94–119	Zach LaVine (28)	Lopez, Carter Jr. (9)	Kris Dunn (7)	United Center; 21,852	9–26
36	December 28	@ Washington	101–92	Zach LaVine (24)	Lauri Markkanen (14)	Kris Dunn (8)	Capital One Arena; 20,409	10–26
37	December 30	@ Toronto	89–95	Lauri Markkanen (18)	Wendell Carter Jr. (11)	Kris Dunn (8)	Scotiabank Arena; 19,800	10–27

January : 2–13 (home: 0–7; road: 2–6)

Game	Date	Team	Score	High points	High rebounds	High assists	Location Attendance	Record
38	January 2	Orlando	84–112	Zach LaVine (16)	Lauri Markkanen (6)	Kris Dunn (4)	United Center; 19,013	10–28
39	January 4	Indiana	116–119 (OT)	Zach LaVine (31)	Lauri Markkanen (9)	Kris Dunn (17)	United Center; 21,284	10–29
40	January 6	Brooklyn	100–117	Zach LaVine (27)	Wendell Carter Jr. (8)	Kris Dunn (7)	United Center; 19,265	10–30
41	January 9	@ Portland	112–124	Wendell Carter Jr. (22)	Chandler Hutchison (8)	Kris Dunn (7)	Moda Center; 19,393	10–31
42	January 11	@ Golden State	109–146	Zach LaVine (29)	Chandler Hutchison (6)	Kris Dunn (5)	Oracle Arena; 19,596	10–32
43	January 12	@ Utah	102–110	Zach LaVine (21)	Wendell Carter Jr. (9)	Kris Dunn (8)	Vivint Smart Home Arena; 18,306	10–33
44	January 15	@ LA Lakers	100–107	Jabari Parker (18)	Wendell Carter Jr. (10)	Zach LaVine (8)	Staples Center; 18,997	10–34
45	January 17	@ Denver	105–135	Lauri Markkanen (27)	Bobby Portis (13)	Zach LaVine (6)	Pepsi Center; 17,289	10–35
46	January 19	Miami	103–117	Zach LaVine (22)	Lauri Markkanen (9)	Zach LaVine (6)	United Center; 20,926	10–36
47	January 21	@ Cleveland	104–88	Zach LaVine (25)	Lopez, Hutchison (9)	Kris Dunn (9)	Quicken Loans Arena; 19,432	11–36
48	January 23	Atlanta	101–121	Zach LaVine (23)	Portis, Hutchison (7)	Zach LaVine (4)	United Center; 18,223	11–37
49	January 25	LA Clippers	101–106	Zach LaVine (29)	Bobby Portis (14)	Kris Dunn (10)	United Center; 19,354	11–38
50	January 27	Cleveland	101–104	Lauri Markkanen (21)	Lauri Markkanen (15)	Kris Dunn (7)	United Center; 19,675	11–39
51	January 29	@ Brooklyn	117–122	Zach LaVine (26)	Lauri Markkanen (19)	Zach LaVine (5)	Barclays Center; 12,726	11–40
52	January 30	@ Miami	105–89	Bobby Portis (26)	Lauri Markkanen (13)	Dunn, Selden (8)	American Airlines Arena; 19,600	12–40

February : 5–5 (home: 2–4; road: 3–1)

Game	Date	Team	Score	High points	High rebounds	High assists	Location Attendance	Record
53	February 2	@ Charlotte	118–125	Lauri Markkanen (30)	Markkanen, Portis (9)	Ryan Arcidiacono (6)	Spectrum Center; 19,114	12–41
54	February 6	New Orleans	120–125	Lauri Markkanen (30)	Lauri Markkanen (10)	Kris Dunn (8)	United Center; 18,116	12–42
55	February 8	@ Brooklyn	125–106	Lauri Markkanen (31)	Lauri Markkanen (18)	Kris Dunn (9)	Barclays Center; 15,267	13–42
56	February 9	Washington	125–134	Zach LaVine (26)	Lauri Markkanen (11)	Kris Dunn (8)	United Center; 19,942	13–43
57	February 11	Milwaukee	99–112	Zach LaVine (27)	Lauri Markkanen (17)	Zach LaVine (7)	United Center; 18,833	13–44
58	February 13	Memphis	122–110	Otto Porter Jr. (37)	Markkanen, Porter Jr. (10)	Ryan Arcidiacono (11)	United Center; 19,114	14–44
59	February 22	@ Orlando	110–109	Lauri Markkanen (25)	Lauri Markkanen (11)	Zach LaVine (6)	Amway Center; 18,846	15–44
60	February 23	Boston	126–116	Zach LaVine (42)	Lauri Markkanen (15)	Kris Dunn (5)	United Center; 21,295	16–44
61	February 25	Milwaukee	106–117	Lopez, Markkanen (26)	Lauri Markkanen (12)	Zach LaVine (9)	United Center; 20,936	16–45
62	February 27	@ Memphis	109–107	Zach LaVine (30)	Lauri Markkanen (10)	Dunn, LaVine (4)	FedExForum; 13,711	17–45

March : 4–11 (home: 2–6; road: 2–5)

Game	Date	Team	Score	High points	High rebounds	High assists	Location Attendance	Record
63	March 1	@ Atlanta	168–161 (4OT)	Zach LaVine (47)	Lauri Markkanen (17)	Zach LaVine (9)	State Farm Arena; 15,267	18–45
64	March 3	Atlanta	118–123	Lauri Markkanen (19)	Lauri Markkanen (9)	Kris Dunn (6)	United Center; 20,526	18–46
65	March 5	@ Indiana	96–105	Zach LaVine (27)	Lauri Markkanen (13)	Kris Dunn (5)	Bankers Life Fieldhouse; 15,753	18–47
66	March 6	Philadelphia	108–107	Zach LaVine (39)	Lopez, Porter Jr. (9)	Dunn, LaVine (4)	United Center; 19,927	19–47
67	March 8	Detroit	104–112	Zach LaVine (24)	Kris Dunn (7)	Otto Porter Jr. (8)	United Center; 21,048	19–48
68	March 10	@ Detroit	108–131	Wayne Selden (18)	Cristiano Felício (7)	Shaquille Harrison (7)	Little Caesars Arena; 19,356	19–49
69	March 12	LA Lakers	107–123	Robin Lopez (20)	Otto Porter Jr. (9)	Kris Dunn (9)	United Center; 21,359	19–50
70	March 15	@ LA Clippers	121–128	Zach LaVine (31)	Lauri Markkanen (8)	Zach LaVine (7)	Staples Center; 17,404	19–51
71	March 17	@ Sacramento	102–129	Zach LaVine (18)	Cristiano Felicio (10)	Shaquille Harrison (7)	Golden 1 Center; 17,583	19–52
72	March 18	@ Phoenix	116–101	Robin Lopez (24)	Lauri Markkanen (9)	Zach LaVine (7)	Talking Stick Resort Arena; 15,879	20–52
73	March 20	Washington	126–120 (OT)	Lauri Markkanen (32)	Lauri Markkanen (13)	Kris Dunn (13)	United Center; 19,470	21–52
74	March 23	Utah	83–114	Lauri Markkanen (18)	Lauri Markkanen (10)	Kris Dunn (5)	United Center; 20,506	21–53
75	March 26	@ Toronto	103–112	Wayne Selden (20)	Lauri Markkanen (9)	Shaquille Harrison (5)	Scotiabank Arena; 19,800	21–54
76	March 27	Portland	98–118	Shaquille Harrison (21)	Wayne Selden (12)	Lopez, Blakeney, Selden (4)	United Center; 20,506	21–55
77	March 30	Toronto	101–124	Walt Lemon (19)	Timothe Luwawu-Cabarrot (10)	Walt Lemon (6)	United Center; 21,238	21–56

April : 1–4 (home: 0–2; road: 1–2)

Game	Date	Team	Score	High points	High rebounds	High assists	Location Attendance	Record
78	April 1	@ New York	105–113	Robin Lopez (29)	Shaquille Harrison (10)	Lemon, Harrison (5)	Madison Square Garden; 18,874	21–57
79	April 3	@ Washington	115–114	Walt Lemon (24)	JaKarr Sampson (9)	Walt Lemon (8)	Capital One Arena; 16,616	22–57
80	April 6	Philadelphia	96–116	JaKarr Sampson (29)	Sampson, Lemon (8)	Walt Lemon (5)	United Center; 21,059	22–58
81	April 9	New York	86–96	Ryan Arcidiacono (14)	Sampson, Felicio (8)	Arcidiacono, Harrison, Selden (3)	United Center; 21,350	22–59
82	April 10	@ Philadelphia	109–125	Walt Lemon (20)	Wayne Selden (8)	Ryan Arcidiacono (6)	Wells Fargo Center; 20,197	22–60

2018–19 season schedule

=== Injured ===
Player	Duration		Reason for Missed Time	Games Missed
Player	Start	End	Reason for Missed Time	Games Missed
Ömer Aşık	September 22, 2018	October 21, 2018	Started developing arthritis.	82 (Waived)

== Player statistics ==
Player	Pos.	GP	GS	MP	Reb.	Ast.	Stl.	Blk.	Pts.
Rawle Alkins	SG	10	1	120	26	13	1	0	37
Ryan Arcidiacono	PG	81	32	1,961	219	269	65	4	544
Antonio Blakeney	SG	57	3	829	106	42	12	9	418
Wendell Carter	C	44	44	1,110	307	78	26	58	455
Kris Dunn	PG	46	44	1,389	187	277	68	21	519
Cristiano Felício	C	60	0	746	218	37	11	7	240
Shaquille Harrison	PG	73	11	1,430	222	139	89	30	474
Justin Holiday^{†}	SG	38	38	1,325	169	85	67	21	440
Chandler Hutchison	SF	44	14	895	185	34	23	6	229
Zach LaVine	SG	63	62	2,171	294	283	60	26	1,492
Walt Lemon^{≠}	PG	6	3	167	27	30	11	1	86
Robin Lopez	C	74	36	1,606	286	89	11	78	704
Timothé Luwawu-Cabarrot^{≠}	SF	29	6	546	79	22	15	7	196
Lauri Markkanen	PF	52	51	1,682	470	75	37	33	974
Jabari Parker^{†}	PF	39	17	1,042	241	84	23	14	556
Cameron Payne^{‡}	PG	31	12	536	53	83	20	6	176
Otto Porter^{≠}	SF	15	15	492	83	40	18	9	262
Bobby Portis^{†}	PF	22	6	531	161	29	11	8	310
Brandon Sampson^{≠}	SG	14	2	214	16	10	8	3	71
JaKarr Sampson^{≠}	SF	4	0	127	32	4	4	3	80
Wayne Selden^{≠}	SG	43	13	984	136	73	23	7	342
Tyler Ulis^{‡}	PG	1	0	1	0	0	0	0	0

After all games.
^{‡}Waived during the season
^{†}Traded during the season
^{≠}Acquired during the season

== Transactions ==
=== Trades ===
July 7, 2018	To Chicago Bulls Julyan Stone (from Charlotte)	To Charlotte Hornets Bismack Biyombo (from Orlando); 2019 second round pick (from Orlando); 2020 second round pick (from Orlando)
July 7, 2018	To Orlando Magic Jerian Grant (from Chicago); Timofey Mozgov (from Charlotte)	
January 3, 2019	To Chicago Bulls MarShon Brooks; Wayne Selden Jr. 2019 second-round pick 2020 second-round pick	To Memphis Grizzlies Justin Holiday
January 7, 2019	To Chicago Bulls Michael Carter-Williams; Cash considerations	To Houston Rockets 2020 Memphis protected second-round pick
January 22, 2019	To Chicago Bulls Carmelo Anthony; Draft rights to Jon Diebler; Cash considerations	To Houston Rockets Draft rights to Tadija Dragićević
February 1, 2019	To Chicago Bulls Timothé Luwawu-Cabarrot; Cash considerations	To Oklahoma City Thunder 2020 protected second round draft pick
February 7, 2019	To Chicago Bulls Otto Porter Jr.	To Washington Wizards Jabari Parker; Bobby Portis; 2023 protected second round draft pick

=== Free agency ===
==== Re-signed ====
Player	Signed
Zach LaVine	July 8, 2018
Antonio Blakeney	July 19, 2018
Ryan Arcidiacono	July 31, 2018

==== Additions ====
Player	Signed	Former team
Jabari Parker	July 14, 2018	Milwaukee Bucks
Antonius Cleveland	July 23, 2018	Atlanta Hawks
Rawle Alkins	Two-way contract	Arizona Wildcats
Derrick Walton	August 14, 2018	Miami Heat
Kaiser Gates	September 24, 2018	Xavier Musketeers
JaKarr Sampson	September 24, 2018	Sacramento Kings

==== Subtractions ====
Player	Reason left	New team
Sean Kilpatrick	Waived	(Greece) Panathinaikos B.C. OPAP
Julyan Stone	Waived	(Italy) Reyer Venezia
Paul Zipser	Waived	(Spain) San Pablo Burgos
Noah Vonleh	Free agent	New York Knicks
Quincy Pondexter	Free agent	San Antonio Spurs
Cameron Payne	Waived	Cleveland Cavaliers
Michael Carter-Williams	Waived	Orlando Magic
MarShon Brooks	Waived	(China) Guangdong Southern Tigers
Carmelo Anthony	Waived	
