= Antonio Blakeney =

American basketball player (born 1996)

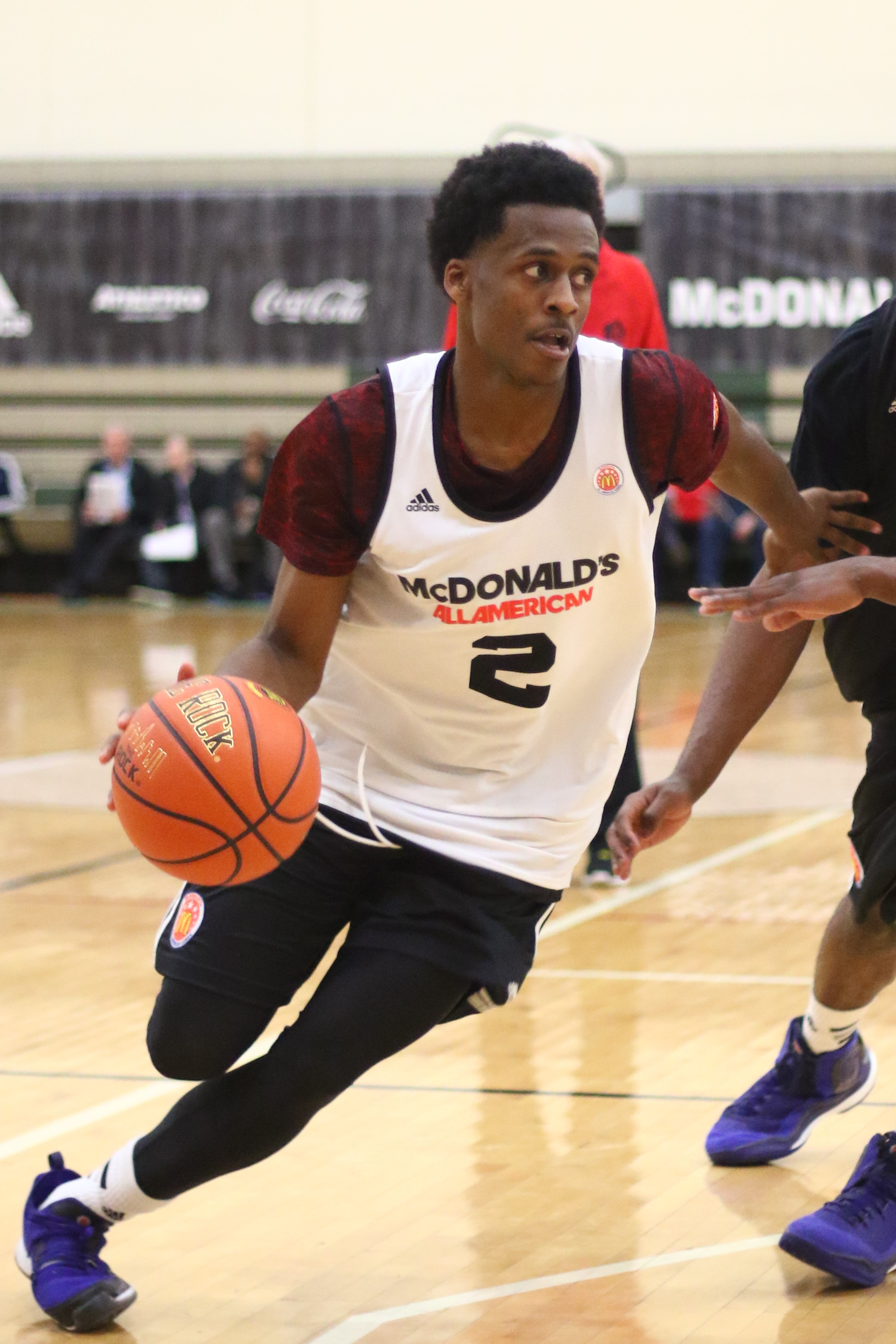
- Blakeney in 2015

No. 2 – Hapoel Tel Aviv
- Position: Shooting guard / small forward
- League: Israeli Basketball Premier League; EuroLeague

Personal information
- Born: October 4, 1996 (age 30) Watertown, New York, U.S.
- Listed height: 6 ft 4 in (1.93 m)
- Listed weight: 194 lb (88 kg)

Career information
- High school: Cardinal Mooney (Sarasota, Florida); Oak Ridge (Orlando, Florida)
- College: LSU (2015–2017)
- NBA draft: 2017: undrafted
- Playing career: 2017–present

Career history
- 2017–2019: Chicago Bulls
- 2017–2018: →Windy City Bulls
- 2019–2020: Jiangsu Dragons
- 2021: Canton Charge
- 2022: Al-Ahli
- 2022: Hapoel Be'er Sheva
- 2022–2023: Jiangsu Dragons
- 2023–2024: Nanjing Monkey Kings
- 2024–present: Hapoel Tel Aviv

Career highlights
- EuroCup champion (2025); CBA scoring champion (2023); All-NBA G League Second Team (2018); NBA G League Rookie of the Year (2018); NBA G League All-Rookie Team (2018); Second-team All-SEC (2017); McDonald's All-American (2015); Third-team Parade All-American (2015); Florida Mr. Basketball (2015)
- Stats at NBA.com
- Stats at Basketball Reference

Antonio Davon Blakeney (born October 4, 1996) is an American professional basketball player for Hapoel Tel Aviv of the Israeli Basketball Premier League and the EuroLeague. He played college basketball for the LSU Tigers. He played in the NBA for the Chicago Bulls.

In 2015, Blakeney was named Florida Mr. Basketball and a McDonald's All-American. In 2018, he was named NBA G League Rookie of the Year. In 2023, he was the Chinese Basketball Association scoring champion.

== Early life ==
Blakeney was born in Watertown, New York, to Tequisha Blakeney, a registered nurse and director of nursing in a nursing home, and a former member of the U.S. Army. He has two brothers, Tyrieke Blakeney and Dontrez Jones. He and his family later lived in Sarasota, Florida, and subsequently in Orlando, Florida.

== High school career ==
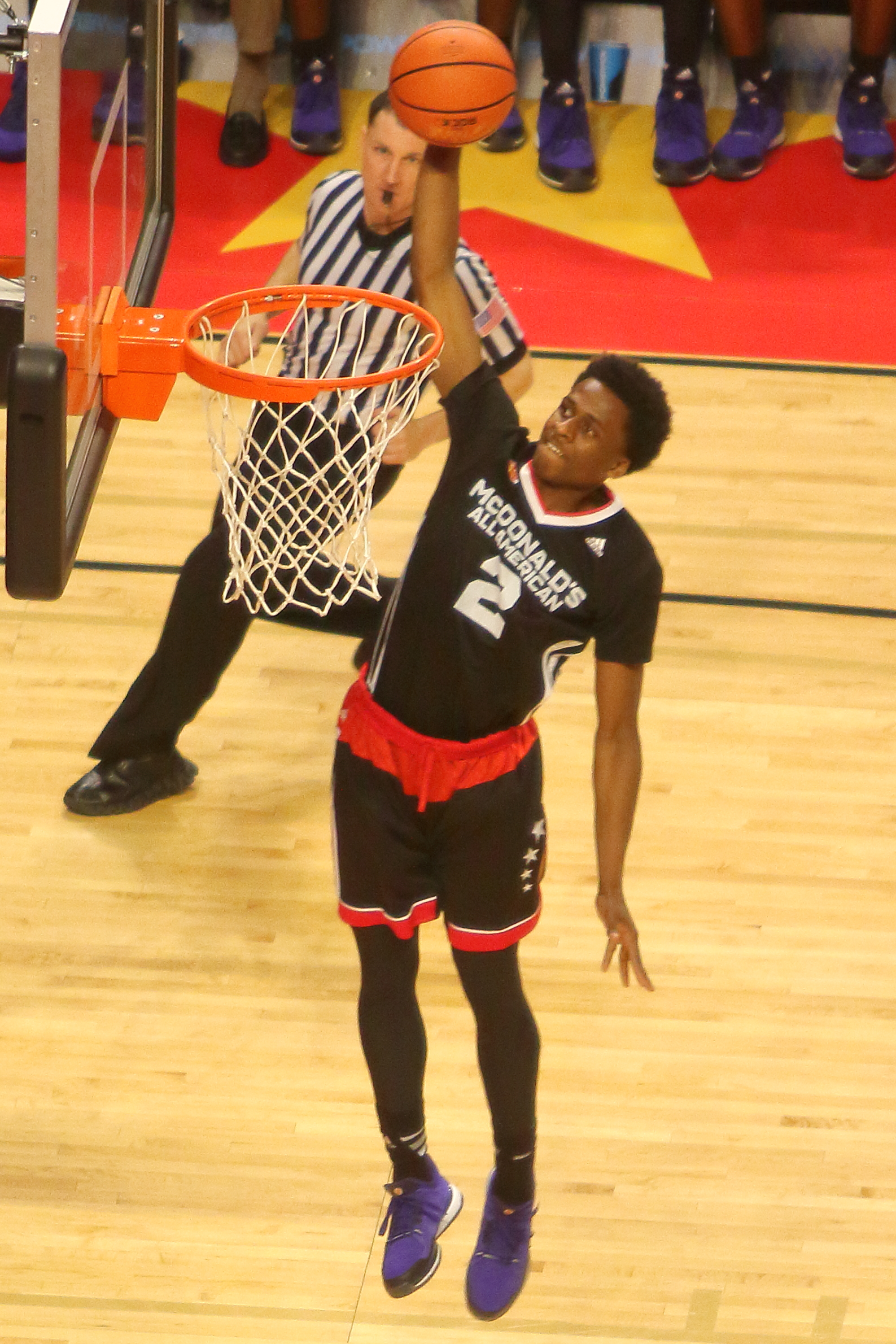
Blakeney tomahawk dunk in 2015.

Blakeney played basketball as a sophomore at Cardinal Mooney High School in Sarasota, and averaged 24.8 points per game. He was named the Sarasota Herald-Tribune Player of the Year.

He transferred to and played basketball for Oak Ridge High School in Orlando, Florida. In his junior year, he averaged 25.2 points, 5.0 rebounds, and 3.6 assists per game. In his senior year (2014-15), Blakeney averaged 29.0 points, 6.9 rebounds, and 2.7 assists per game. He was a 2015 McDonald's All-American, 2015 Slam Magazine All-American, Florida's Mr. Basketball, Class 8A Player of the Year, and Orlando Sentinel 2015 all-area Player of the Year.

Blakeney was rated as a 5-star recruit by Rivals, ESPN, and 247Sports. Rivals had him as the #13 overall recruit, while ESPN had him at #15, and 247 at #16. Both ESPN and 247 ranked him as the #3 shooting guard in the nation.

== College career ==
Blakeney initially gave a verbal commitment to the University of Louisville, but then he changed his mind about 10 days later and decommitted. Blakeney ended up committing to Louisiana State University, (LSU) in the Southeastern Conference (SEC), where he majored in sports administration. At LSU he was featured in 34 games as a freshman, playing alongside Ben Simmons. Behind Simmons and Keith Hornsby, Blakeney was LSU's third-leading scorer in 2015–16, in 33 games averaging 30.8 minutes, 12.6 points, and 3.5 rebounds, and 0.9 assists a contest, hitting a team-best 52 three-point shots on the season. He was named to the SEC All-Freshman Team.

The 2016–17 season saw him emerge as LSU's leading scorer, 31 games averaging 32.9 minutes and pouring in 17.2 points per contest (5th in the conference), while corralling 4.8 rebounds a game and handing out 1.7 assists per outing, and shooting 45.8% from the field. Blakeney took home an All-SEC Second Team selection that year. In April 2017, he announced that he would forego the remaining two years of his college eligibility and declared for the 2017 NBA draft.

== Professional career ==
=== Chicago Bulls (2017–2019) ===
After going undrafted, Blakeney joined the Chicago Bulls for the 2017 NBA Summer League. Based on his performance there, Blakeney was signed to a two-way contract by the Bulls. Under the terms of the deal, he split time between the Bulls and their G League affiliate, the Windy City Bulls.

He made his professional debut with Chicago on October 19 against the Toronto Raptors. On November 21, 2017, Blakeney scored 15 points in 18 minutes off the bench in a 113–105 loss to the Los Angeles Lakers.

He won the NBA G League Rookie of the Year Award for his time with the Windy City Bulls, with whom in 2017-18 in 32 games Blakeney averaged 38.3 minutes, 32.0 points (2nd in the league), 6.7 rebounds, 3.9 assists, and 1.2 steals per game, while shooting 46.2% from the floor and 86.2% from the free throw line. With the Chicago Bulls in 2017-18, in 19 games he averaged 16.5 minutes, 7.9 points, 1.7 rebounds, and 1.1 assists per game.

On July 19, 2018, Blakeney was signed to an NBA contract by the Bulls.

In the season opener on October 18, 2018, Blakeney scored 15 points off the bench in a 127–108 loss to the Philadelphia 76ers. In a 107–105 loss to the Indiana Pacers on November 2, 2018, Blakeney scored a career-high 22 points off the bench. With the Windy City Bulls in 2018-19 in 2 games he averaged 35.7 minutes, 19.0 points,8.5 rebounds, and 3.5 assists per game. With the Chicago Bulls in 2018-19, in 57 games he averaged 14.5 minutes, 7.3 points, and 1.9 rebounds per game.

On September 9, 2019, Blakeney was released by the Bulls.

=== Jiangsu Dragons (2019–2020) ===
In the 2019–2020 season, Blakeney played in China with the Jiangsu Dragons of the Chinese Basketball Association (CBA). In 16 games he averaged 38.5 minutes, 34.8 points (4th in the league), 8.0 rebounds, 3.4 assists, and 1.6 steals, and 0.9 blocks per game, while shooting 50.0% from the field.

=== Canton Charge (2021) ===
For the 2020–21 season, Blakeney signed with the Canton Charge of the G League. In 15 games he averaged 26.6 minutes, 15.1 points, 4.3 rebounds, 2.1 assists, and 0.9 steals per game.

=== Al Ahli Club of Manama (2022) ===
On Jan, 2022, Blakeney signed with the Al-Ahli of the Bahraini Premier League. On Jan 28, 2022, he scored a game-high 33 points in the 1st round against Al-Najma. He played three games with the team.

=== Hapoel Be'er Sheva (2022) ===
On March 17, 2022, Blakeney signed with Hapoel Be'er Sheva of the Israeli Basketball Premier League. He played four games for the team, in which he averaged 32.0 minutes, 24.5 points, 4.8 rebounds, 4.0 assists, and 1.0 steals per game, while shooting 49.3% from the field.

=== Jiangsu Dragons (2022–2023) ===
In the 2022–23 season, Blakeney played in China with the Jiangsu Dragons of the Chinese Basketball Association (CBA). He was the scoring leader of the league after in 40 games averaging 37.0 minutes, 32.1 points, 7.4 rebounds, 4.8 assists, and 1.1 steals per game, as he shot 45.8% from the field and 82.8% from the free throw line.

=== Nanjing Monkey Kings (2023–2024) ===
Blakeney joined the Nanjing Monkey Kings for the 2023–24 CBA season. On December 29, 2023, he scored 50 points in a 124–99 win over Shanxi Loongs, his fourth 50-point CBA game. In 49 games he averaged 34.5 minutes, 30.5 points (2nd in the league), 7.1 rebounds, and 4.3 assists per game, while shooting 49.7% from the field, 41.2% from three-point range, and 85.4% from the free throw line.

=== Hapoel Tel Aviv (2024–present) ===
On October 21, 2024, Blakeney signed with Hapoel Tel Aviv of the Israeli Basketball Premier League and EuroCup.

In 2024-25, in 42 games he averaged 21.3 minutes, 13.4 points, 3.0 rebounds, and 1.5assists per game, while shooting 46.5% from the field.

In 2025-26, in 58 games he averaged 22.7 minutes, 13.6 points, 2.4 rebounds, and 1.2 assists per game, while shooting 40.3% from three-point range and 83.9% from the free throw line.

On July 10, 2026, the team extended his contract until the summer of 2029.

== Personal life ==
On January 15, 2026, the U.S. Department of Justice and FBI announced that Blakeney was among those who would be charged in connection with a federal investigation into an illegal gambling operation that prosecutors alleged was organized by two individuals previously named in a October 2025 NBA gambling scandal, which they alleged involved 39 college basketball players. Prosecutors alleged Blakeney was recruited to fix games in 2022 in the Chinese Basketball Association, and was paid $200,000 for point shaving and match fixing; Blakeney has not stood trial on these allegations. Legal representatives for the defendants emphasized that an indictment consists of unproven accusations.

== Career statistics ==
Legend
GP	Games played	GS	Games started	MPG	Minutes per game
FG%	Field goal percentage	3P%	3-point field goal percentage	FT%	Free throw percentage
RPG	Rebounds per game	APG	Assists per game	SPG	Steals per game
BPG	Blocks per game	PPG	Points per game	**Bold**	Career high

=== NBA ===
==== Regular season ====
Year	Team	GP	GS	MPG	FG%	3P%	FT%	RPG	APG	SPG	BPG	PPG
2017–18	Chicago	19	0	**16.5**	.371	.288	**.769**	1.7	**1.1**	**.4**	.1	**10.8**
2018–19	Chicago	**57**	**3**	14.5	**.419**	**.396**	.658	**1.9**	.7	.2	**.2**	8.3
Career		76	3	15.0	.406	.357	.696	1.8	.8	.3	.1	10.5

=== College ===
Year	Team	GP	GS	MPG	FG%	3P%	FT%	RPG	APG	SPG	BPG	PPG
2015–16	LSU	**33**	24	30.8	.425	.335	**.748**	3.5	.9	**.7**	**.2**	12.6
2016–17	LSU	31	**30**	**32.9**	**.458**	**.358**	.724	**4.8**	**1.7**	**.7**	.1	**17.2**
Career		64	54	31.8	.444	.347	.736	4.1	1.3	.7	.1	15.8
