= Chandler Hutchison =

American basketball player (born 1996)

No. 1 – Rip City Remix
- Position: Small forward
- League: NBA G League

Personal information
- Born: April 26, 1996 (age 30) Mission Viejo, California
- Listed height: 6 ft 6 in (1.98 m)
- Listed weight: 210 lb (95 kg)

Career information
- High school: Mission Viejo (Mission Viejo, California)
- College: Boise State (2014–2018)
- NBA draft: 2018: 1st round, 22nd overall pick
- Drafted by: Chicago Bulls
- Playing career: 2018–present

Career history
- 2018–2021: Chicago Bulls
- 2019–2020: → Windy City Bulls
- 2021: Washington Wizards
- 2021–2022: Phoenix Suns
- 2021: → Santa Cruz Warriors
- 2022: Sioux Falls Skyforce
- 2024–2026: Cleveland Charge
- 2026–present: Rip City Remix

Career highlights
- MW Player of the Year – Media (2018); 2× First-team All-MW (2017, 2018); MW All-Defensive Team (2018)
- Stats at NBA.com
- Stats at Basketball Reference

Chandler Hutchison (born April 26, 1996) is an American professional basketball player for the Rip City Remix of the NBA G League. He played college basketball for the Boise State Broncos.

== High school career ==
Hutchison lettered two years at Mission Viejo High School. As a junior, he averaged 13.8 points and 4.8 rebounds while leading Mission Viejo to the regional quarterfinals of the CIF Southern Section 1AA Tournament.

In his senior season, he was ranked No. 80 in the ESPN Top 100, the No. 7 prospect in California and a consensus 4-star recruit by 247 Sports. He averaged 19.5 points and led Mission Viejo to the CIF Southern Section title game and regional quarterfinals of CIF State Championship tournament.

== College career ==
Hutchison posted 3.1 points per game as a freshman and started in the NCAA Tournament matchup versus Dayton. He averaged 6.8 points and 4.1 rebounds per game as a sophomore in 2015–16. With the departure of James Webb III, coach Leon Rice began to look at Hutchison as more of an offensive threat, and he responded by hitting the weight room and remaking his jump shot. He had a breakout season as a junior, averaging 17.4 points, 7.8 rebounds and 2.6 assists per game while making 37.7% of his threes. He declared for the 2017 NBA draft but returned to the Broncos. Hutchison had a stellar senior year, averaging 20 points and 7.7 rebounds per contest. As a senior, he was named to the First-team All-Mountain West Conference. Hutchison was a Top-10 Finalist for the Jerry West Award and a Top-30 Finalist for the Naismith Trophy. Hutchison also was one of two MW Players of the Year, earning the honor from league media while Nevada's Caleb Martin received the honor from the league's coaches.

== Professional career ==
=== Chicago Bulls (2018–2021) ===
Hutchison was drafted 22nd overall in the 2018 NBA draft by the Chicago Bulls. On July 3, 2018, Hutchison officially signed with the Bulls. He made his NBA debut playing three minutes in a loss to the Philadelphia 76ers on October 18.

On January 23, Hutchison suffered an acute injury to a sesamoid bone in his right foot. He was assigned to the Bulls’ NBA G League affiliate, the Windy City Bulls to rehabilitate his injury on December 31, 2019.

=== Washington Wizards (2021) ===
On March 25, 2021, Hutchison was traded to the Washington Wizards in a three-team trade involving the Boston Celtics.

On August 6, Hutchison was traded to the San Antonio Spurs and was later waived on September 4.

=== Phoenix Suns (2021–2022) ===
On September 7, 2021, Hutchison signed a two-way contract with the Phoenix Suns. He played six games for the Suns, totaling 23 minutes. On January 4, 2022, he was waived.

=== Sioux Falls Skyforce (2022) ===
On February 1, 2022, Hutchison was acquired by the Sioux Falls Skyforce. Hutchison joined the Atlanta Hawks for the 2022 NBA Summer League. He rejoined the Skyforce for the beginning of the 2022–23 season.

On November 29, 2022, Hutchison retired at the age of 26. However on October 25, 2024, he came out of retirement to enter the 2024 NBA G League draft.

=== Cleveland Charge (2024–present) ===
On October 26, 2024, Hutchison joined the Cleveland Charge.

== Career statistics ==
Legend
GP	Games played	GS	Games started	MPG	Minutes per game
FG%	Field goal percentage	3P%	3-point field goal percentage	FT%	Free throw percentage
RPG	Rebounds per game	APG	Assists per game	SPG	Steals per game
BPG	Blocks per game	PPG	Points per game	**Bold**	Career high

=== NBA ===
==== Regular season ====
Year	Team	GP	GS	MPG	FG%	3P%	FT%	RPG	APG	SPG	BPG	PPG
2018–19	Chicago	**44**	**14**	**20.3**	.459	.280	.605	**4.2**	.8	.5	.1	5.2
2019–20	Chicago	28	10	18.8	.457	.316	.590	3.9	**.9**	**1.0**	.3	**7.8**
2020–21	Chicago	7	0	9.1	.278	.333	**1.000**	2.9	.6	.1	.0	1.9
2020–21	Washington	18	1	15.7	.400	**.368**	.826	3.2	.7	.6	**.6**	5.2
2021–22	Phoenix	6	0	3.7	**.500**	–	**1.000**	.8	.3	.0	.0	.7
Career		103	25	17.4	.442	.309	.643	3.7	.8	.6	.2	5.4

==== Playoffs ====
Year	Team	GP	GS	MPG	FG%	3P%	FT%	RPG	APG	SPG	BPG	PPG
2021	Washington	2	0	9.0	.400	—	1.000	1.5	.5	.0	.0	3.0
Career		2	0	9.0	.400	—	1.000	1.5	.5	.0	.0	3.0

=== College ===
Year	Team	GP	GS	MPG	FG%	3P%	FT%	RPG	APG	SPG	BPG	PPG
2014–15	Boise State	29	18	12.3	.356	.286	.649	2.0	.8	.5	.1	3.1
2015–16	Boise State	31	8	19.8	**.497**	.231	.636	4.1	1.3	.7	**.4**	6.8
2016–17	Boise State	**32**	**32**	**31.7**	.495	.377	.665	**7.8**	2.6	1.2	.2	17.4
2017–18	Boise State	31	31	31.0	.475	**.385**	**.728**	7.7	**3.5**	**1.5**	.3	**20.0**
Career		123	89	24.0	.476	.353	.687	5.5	2.1	1.0	.2	12.0
