= Walt Lemon Jr. =

American basketball player (born 1992)

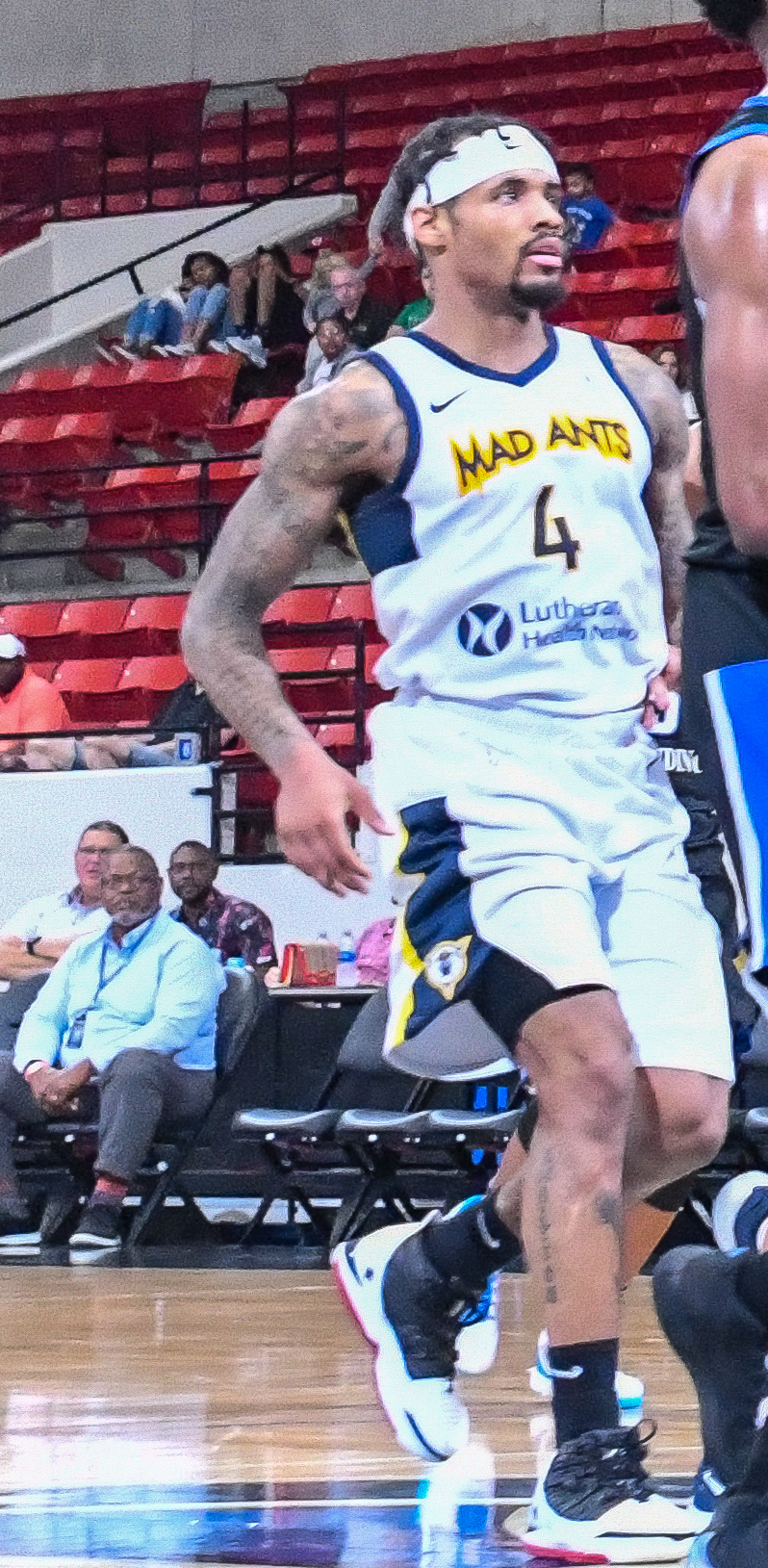
- Lemon with the Fort Wayne Mad Ants in 2019

Free agent
- Position: Point guard

Personal information
- Born: July 26, 1992 (age 34) Chicago, Illinois, U.S.
- Listed height: 6 ft 2 in (1.88 m)
- Listed weight: 180 lb (82 kg)

Career information
- High school: Julian (Chicago, Illinois)
- College: Bradley (2010–2014)
- NBA draft: 2014: undrafted
- Playing career: 2014–present

Career history
- 2014: EGIS Körmend
- 2015: Crailsheim Merlins
- 2015–2016: Fort Wayne Mad Ants
- 2016–2017: Istanbulspor Beylikduzu
- 2017: Rethymno Cretan Kings
- 2017–2018: Fort Wayne Mad Ants
- 2018: New Orleans Pelicans
- 2018: Maine Red Claws
- 2018–2019: Windy City Bulls
- 2019: Chicago Bulls
- 2019–2020: Fort Wayne Mad Ants
- 2020: Hapoel Tel Aviv
- 2021: Ezzahra Sports
- 2021–2022: Fort Wayne Mad Ants
- 2022: Ottawa BlackJacks
- 2022–2023: Club Africain
- 2023: Club San Carlos
- 2023: Mineros de Zacatecas
- 2023–2024: Al-Arabi
- 2024–2025: Shanxi Loongs

Career highlights
- Qatari Cup winner (2024); Third-team All NBA G League (2018); 2× Second-team All-MVC (2013, 2014); 2× MVC All-Defensive Team (2013, 2014); 2× MVC Most-Improved Team (2012, 2013)
- Stats at NBA.com
- Stats at Basketball Reference

Walter Lemon Jr. (born July 26, 1992) is an American professional basketball player who last played for the Shanxi Loongs of the Chinese Basketball Association (CBA). He played college basketball for four years with the Bradley Braves.

== High school career ==
Lemon attended Julian High School where he averaged 19 points, six assists, five rebounds and three steals per game as a senior, earning him a third-team 3A all-state pick by the Illinois Basketball Coaches Association and a second-team All-Chicago Public League.

== College career ==
After graduating, Lemon went to Bradley between 2010–2014, where he averaged 18 points and 3 rebounds as a senior. When he graduated he ranked among Bradley's all-time top 10 in career points (1721, 7th), assists (367, 10th) and steals (222, 3rd) and had several awards, including the MVC Men's Basketball Scholar-Athlete of the Year in 2014, Bradley's first player ever to win the award. He was named to the All‑Missouri Valley Conference Second Team in 2013 and 2014.

== Professional career ==
=== Körmend (2014) ===
After going undrafted in the 2014 NBA draft, Lemon joined the Golden State Warriors for the 2015 NBA Summer League. On September 10, 2014, he signed with Hungarian team EGIS Körmend for the 2014–15 season. On December 23, 2014, he parted ways with the club after appearing in 12 league games.

=== Crailsheim Merlins (2015) ===
On February 6, 2015, he signed with the Crailsheim Merlins of Germany for the rest of the season. In eight games for the Merlins, he averaged 6.4 points, 1.0 rebounds and 1.1 assists per game.

=== Fort Wayne Mad Ants (2015–2016) ===
On October 31, 2015, Lemon was selected by the Fort Wayne Mad Ants in the second round of the 2015 NBA Development League draft.

=== İstanbulspor Beylikdüzü (2016) ===
On July 15, 2016, Lemon signed with İstanbulspor Beylikdüzü of the TBL.

=== Rethymno Cretan Kings (2017) ===
On February 20, 2017, Lemon Jr. signed with the Greek team Rethymno Cretan Kings.

=== Fort Wayne Mad Ants (2017–2018) ===
On November 2, 2017, Lemon was included in the opening night roster for Fort Wayne Mad Ants. Lemon was later named G League Player of the Month for November.

=== New Orleans Pelicans (2018) ===
On February 21, 2018, the New Orleans Pelicans signed Lemon to a 10-day contract. He made his NBA debut two days later in a 124–123 overtime win over the Miami Heat, playing in four minutes that night. Lemon signed his second 10-day contract on March 4. After the expiration of his second 10-day contract, Lemon returned to Fort Wayne.

=== Maine Red Claws (2018) ===
On July 25, Lemon signed a two-way contract with the Boston Celtics. During this time, he was expected to split his playing time between the Celtics and their NBA G League affiliate, the Maine Red Claws. On November 29, 2018, Lemon was waived by the Celtics without appearing in a game for the parent club.

=== Windy City Bulls (2018–2019) ===
On December 8, 2018, the Fort Wayne Mad Ants announced that they had acquired the right of Alex Hamilton and a first round pick in the 2019 NBA G League draft from the Windy City Bulls in exchange for the right to Lemon.

On January 16, 2019, Lemon was suspended for one game without pay and fined for directing inappropriate language toward a game official.

=== Chicago Bulls (2019) ===
On March 29, 2019, the Chicago Bulls announced that they had signed Lemon. On March 30, 2019, Lemon made his debut with the Bulls, scoring 19 points with 6 assists and four steals. In his third game in a Chicago Bulls uniform, in a game against the Wizards in Washington, D.C., on April 3, 2019, Lemon led all players with 24 points in a very efficient 11 of 16 from the floor while leading all players with eight assists. In the final minute of the game, Lemon hit one go ahead basket and afterwards a go-ahead free throw. On the other end of the floor Lemon secured the victory defensively for the Bulls, 115–114.

=== Fort Wayne Mad Ants (2019–2020) ===
On October 10, 2019, the Indiana Pacers announced that they had signed Lemon. This comes after the release of 2x Sun Belt Defensive Player of the Year JaKeenan Gant. Terms of the contract weren't released. On October 16, 2019, Lemon was waived by the Indiana Pacers. On October 26, 2019, Lemon was included in the training camp roster for the Fort Wayne Mad Ants. On November 6, 2019, Lemon was included in the opening night roster of the Fort Wayne Mad Ants. He averaged 20.3 points, 6.8 assists and 4.4 rebounds per game.

=== Hapoel Tel Aviv (2020) ===
On August 15, 2020, Lemon signed with Hapoel Tel Aviv of the Israeli Premier League. He averaged 10.6 points, 4.2 assists and 1.4 steals per game.

=== Ezzahra Sports (2021) ===
On September 11, 2021, Lemon signed with Ezzahra Sports of the Championnat National A.

=== Return to the Fort Wayne Mad Ants (2021–2022) ===
On December 30, 2021, Lemon signed with the Fort Wayne Mad Ants of the NBA G League, averaging 12.3 points and 6.2 assists in 32 games.

=== Ottawa BlackJacks (2022) ===
On May 2, 2022, Lemon signed with the Ottawa BlackJacks of the CEBL.

=== Club Africain (2022–2023) ===
On September 22, 2022, Lemon signed with Club Africain in Tunisia.

=== Al-Arabi (2023–2024) ===
In December 2023, Lemon signed with Al-Arabi of the Qatari Basketball League (QBL) for the remainder of the 2023–24 season in Qatar. He guided Al-Arabi to their third Qatari Cup. He scored a game-high 24 points in the final against Al Ahli Doha.

=== Shanxi Loongs (2024–2025) ===
In December 2024, Lemon signed with the Shanxi Loongs of the Chinese Basketball Association (CBA).

== Career statistics ==
Legend
GP	Games played	GS	Games started	MPG	Minutes per game
FG%	Field goal percentage	3P%	3-point field goal percentage	FT%	Free throw percentage
RPG	Rebounds per game	APG	Assists per game	SPG	Steals per game
BPG	Blocks per game	PPG	Points per game	**Bold**	Career high

=== NBA ===
==== Regular season ====
Year	Team	GP	GS	MPG	FG%	3P%	FT%	RPG	APG	SPG	BPG	PPG
2017–18	New Orleans	5	0	7.0	**.438**	**1.000**	.667	.4	1.0	.0	.2	3.4
2018–19	Chicago	**6**	**3**	**27.8**	.437	.400	**.727**	**4.5**	**5.0**	**1.8**	.2	**14.3**
Career		11	3	18.4	.437	.500	.714	2.6	3.2	1.0	.2	9.4

=== College ===
Year	Team	GP	GS	MPG	FG%	3P%	FT%	RPG	APG	SPG	BPG	PPG
2010–11	Bradley	31	5	20.0	.419	.324	.660	2.4	.9	.9	.4	6.4
2011–12	Bradley	32	25	30.7	**.471**	**.345**	.667	3.1	2.5	1.3	**.5**	12.6
2012–13	Bradley	**35**	**34**	34.3	.451	.330	**.761**	**4.2**	3.8	2.1	.4	15.6
2013–14	Bradley	32	31	**35.5**	.424	.290	.746	3.1	**3.9**	**2.4**	.1	**18.0**
Career		130	95	30.3	.442	.321	.719	3.2	2.8	1.7	.3	13.2

== Personal life ==
He is the son of Walter Sr. and Katrina Lemon and is one of three siblings. Earning a spot on the Bradley Athletic Director's Honor Roll three times, Lemon earned his bachelor's degree in psychology.
