= 2015–16 Virginia Tech Hokies men's basketball team =

American college basketball season

2015–16 Virginia Tech Hokies men's basketball
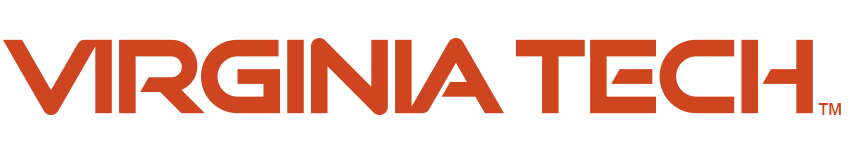

NIT, Second Round
- Conference: Atlantic Coast Conference
- Record: 20–15 (10–8 ACC)
- Head coach: Buzz Williams (2nd season)
- Assistant coaches: Isaac Chew; Steve Roccaforte; Jamie McNeilly
- Home arena: Cassell Coliseum

2015–16 ACC men's basketball standings
	Conf.				Overall
Team	W		L	PCT	W		L	PCT
No. 3 North Carolina †	14	–	4	.778	33	–	7	.825
No. 4 Virginia	13	–	5	.722	29	–	8	.784
No. 10 Miami (FL)	13	–	5	.722	27	–	8	.771
No. 16 Louisville*	12	–	6	.667	23	–	8	.742
Notre Dame	11	–	7	.611	24	–	12	.667
No. 19 Duke	11	–	7	.611	25	–	11	.694
Virginia Tech	10	–	8	.556	20	–	15	.571
Clemson	10	–	8	.556	17	–	14	.548
Pittsburgh	9	–	9	.500	21	–	12	.636
Syracuse	9	–	9	.500	23	–	14	.622
Georgia Tech	8	–	10	.444	21	–	15	.583
Florida State	8	–	10	.444	20	–	14	.588
NC State	5	–	13	.278	16	–	17	.485
Wake Forest	2	–	16	.111	11	–	20	.355
Boston College	0	–	18	.000	7	–	25	.219
† 2016 ACC tournament winner * Ineligible for both the 2016 ACC tournament and the 2016 NCAA tournament due to self-imposed postseason ban. Rankings from AP poll

The 2015–16 Virginia Tech Hokies men's basketball team represented Virginia Polytechnic Institute and State University during the 2015–16 NCAA Division I men's basketball season. The Hokies were led by second year head coach Buzz Williams and played their home games at Cassell Coliseum. They were a member of the Atlantic Coast Conference. They finished the season 20–15, 10–8 in ACC play to finish in a tie for seventh place. They defeated Florida State in the second round of the ACC tournament to advance to the quarterfinals where they lost to Miami (FL). They were invited to the National Invitation Tournament where they defeated Princeton in the first round to advance to the second round where they lost to BYU.

== Last season ==
The Hokies finished the 2014–15 season 11–21, 2–16 in ACC play to finish in last place. They advanced to the second round of the ACC tournament where they lost to Miami (FL).

== Departures ==
Name	Number	Pos.	Height	Weight	Year	Hometown	Notes
Malik Müller	1	G	6'3"	220	RS Freshman	Ehingen, Germany	Play professionally overseas
Joey van Zegeren	2	F	6'10"	235	RS Junior	Hoogeveen, Netherlands	Transferred to Northwestern
Adam Smith	3	G	6'1"	170	RS Junior	Jonesboro, GA	Graduate transferred to Georgia Tech
Christian Beyer	22	F	6'7"	220	Senior	New Bern, NC	Graduated
Will Johnston	25	G	6'4"	205	Senior	Midlothian, VA	Graduated

=== Incoming transfers ===
Name	Number	Pos.	Height	Weight	Year	Hometown	Previous School
Johnny Hamilton	22	C	6'11"	215	Sophomore	Louisville, KY	Junior college transferred from Jacksonville College.
Ty Outlaw	42	F	6'6"	215	Junior	Roxboro, NC	Junior college transferred from Lee College.

== Recruiting class ==
College recruiting information
Name	Hometown	School	Height	Weight	Commit date
Chris Clarke; SF	Virginia Beach, VA	Cape Henry Collegiate School	6 ft 6 in (1.98 m)	190 lb (86 kg)	Nov 6, 2014
Chris Clarke; SF	Recruit ratings: Scout: Rivals: 247Sports: ESPN:				
Kerry Blackshear Jr. PF	Orlando, FL	Maynard Evans High School	6 ft 9 in (2.06 m)	220 lb (100 kg)	Oct 4, 2014
Kerry Blackshear Jr. PF	Recruit ratings: Scout: Rivals: 247Sports: ESPN:				
Justin Robinson; PG	Manassas, VA	St. James School	6 ft 1 in (1.85 m)	178 lb (81 kg)	Oct 12, 2014
Justin Robinson; PG	Recruit ratings: Scout: Rivals: 247Sports: ESPN:				
Overall recruit ranking: Scout: NA Rivals: NA 247Sports: 23 ESPN: 19
Note: In many cases, Scout, Rivals, 247Sports, On3, and ESPN may conflict in their listings of height and weight.; In these cases, the average was taken. ESPN grades are on a 100-point scale.; Sources: "Virginia Tech Commit List for 2015". Rivals.; "ESPN". ESPN.; "2015 Team Ranking". Rivals.

== Roster ==
2015–16 Virginia Tech Hokies men's basketball team
Players
Coaches

Pos.	#	Name	Height	Weight	Year	Previous school	Hometown
F	0	Shane Henry	6 ft 8 in (2.03 m)	190 lb (86 kg)	Sr	Newton/Georgia Perimeter College	Newton, Georgia
G	4	Seth Allen	6 ft 1 in (1.85 m)	195 lb (88 kg)	RS Jr	Fredericksburg Christian/Maryland	Woodbridge, Virginia
G	5	Justin Robinson	6 ft 1 in (1.85 m)	185 lb (84 kg)	Fr	St. James School (MD)	Manassas, Virginia
G	10	Justin Bibbs	6 ft 5 in (1.96 m)	220 lb (100 kg)	So	Montverde Academy	Dayton, Ohio
G	11	Devin Wilson	6 ft 4 in (1.93 m)	190 lb (86 kg)	RS Jr	Montour	McKees Rocks, Pennsylvania
G	13	Ahmed Hill	6 ft 5 in (1.96 m)	195 lb (88 kg)	So	Aquinas	Augusta, Georgia
F	14	Greg Donlon (W)	6 ft 8 in (2.03 m)	230 lb (104 kg)	Sr	Cosby	Midlothian, Virginia
G/F	15	Chris Clarke	6 ft 6 in (1.98 m)	205 lb (93 kg)	Fr	Cape Henry	Virginia Beach, Virginia
F	21	Satchel Pierce	7 ft 0 in (2.13 m)	255 lb (116 kg)	So	The Kiski School	Barberton, Ohio
C	22	Johnny Hamilton	7 ft 0 in (2.13 m)	230 lb (104 kg)	Jr	St. Augustine/Jacksonville College	Rio Claro, Trinidad and Tobago
G	23	Jalen Hudson	6 ft 5 in (1.96 m)	195 lb (88 kg)	So	St. Vincent–St. Mary	Akron, Ohio
F	24	Kerry Blackshear Jr.	6 ft 10 in (2.08 m)	240 lb (109 kg)	Fr	Maynard Evans	Orlando, Florida
F	32	Zach LeDay	6 ft 7 in (2.01 m)	235 lb (107 kg)	RS Jr	The Colony/South Florida	Dallas, Texas
G	33	Matt Galloway	6 ft 3 in (1.91 m)	195 lb (88 kg)	RS Jr	Potomac Falls/Hood College	Sterling, VA
G/F	42	Ty Outlaw	6 ft 6 in (1.98 m)	215 lb (98 kg)	Jr	Person/Lee College	Roxboro, NC

Head coach

- Buzz Williams (Oklahoma City)

Assistant coach(es)

- Isaac Chew (Avila)
- Steve Roccaforte (Lamar)
- Jamie McNeilly (New Orleans)

Legend

- (C) Team captain
- (S) Suspended
- (I) Ineligible
- (W) Walk-on
- Injured
- Current redshirt

Roster

== Schedule ==
Date time, TV	Rank^{#}	Opponent^{#}	Result	Record	Site (attendance) city, state
Non-conference regular season
Nov 14*; 7:00 pm, ESPN3		Alabama State; Emerald Coast Classic	L 82–85	0–1	Cassell Coliseum (6,519); Blacksburg, VA
Nov 18*; 7:00 pm, ESPN3		Jacksonville State; Emerald Coast Classic	W 71–62	1–1	Cassell Coliseum (4,984); Blacksburg, VA
Nov 21*; 7:00 pm, ESPN3		VMI	W 76–52	2–1	Cassell Coliseum (5,644); Blacksburg, VA
Nov 24*; 7:00 pm, ESPN3		North Carolina A&T	W 90–60	3–1	Cassell Coliseum (4,464); Blacksburg, VA
Nov 27*; 7:00 pm, CBSSN		vs. No. 4 Iowa State; Emerald Coast Classic semifinals	L 77–99	3–2	The Arena (2,222); Niceville, FL
Nov 28*; 3:30 pm, CBSSN		vs. UAB; Emerald Coast Classic	W 82–77 ^{OT}	4–2	The Arena (2,222); Niceville, FL
Dec 1*; 7:00 pm, ESPNU		Northwestern; ACC–Big Ten Challenge	L 79–81 ^{OT}	4–3	Cassell Coliseum (4,879); Blacksburg, VA
Dec 5*; 3:00 pm, ESPN3		Arkansas–Pine Bluff	W 80–45	5–3	Cassell Coliseum (4,931); Blacksburg, VA
Dec 9*; 7:00 pm		at Radford; New River Valley rivalry	W 74–65	6–3	Dedmon Center (4,013); Radford, VA
Dec 13*; 3:00 pm, ESPN3		Lamar	W 88–53	7–3	Cassell Coliseum (4,870); Blacksburg, VA
Dec 19*; 6:00 pm, ESPN3		Grambling State	W 87–52	8–3	Cassell Coliseum (4,649); Blacksburg, VA
Dec 22*; 1:00 pm		vs. Saint Joseph's; Atlantic 10/ACC Showcase	L 62–79	8–4	Barclays Center; Brooklyn, NY
Dec 30*; 12:00 pm, ESPNU		No. 19 West Virginia	L 63–88	8–5	Cassell Coliseum (9,567); Blacksburg, VA
ACC regular season
Jan 2; 2:00 pm, RSN		NC State	W 73–68 ^{OT}	9–5 (1–0)	Cassell Coliseum (4,971); Blacksburg, VA
Jan 4; 9:00 pm, ESPN2		No. 4 Virginia; Commonwealth Clash	W 70–68	10–5 (2–0)	Cassell Coliseum (6,157); Blacksburg, VA
Jan 9; 12:00 pm, ACCN		at No. 14 Duke	L 58–82	10–6 (2–1)	Cameron Indoor Stadium (9,314); Durham, NC
Jan 13; 9:00 pm, RSN		Wake Forest	W 93–91	11–6 (3–1)	Cassell Coliseum (4,985); Blacksburg, VA
Jan 16; 12:00 pm, RSN		at Georgia Tech	W 78–77	12–6 (4–1)	Hank McCamish Pavilion (6,470); Atlanta, GA
Jan 20; 7:00 pm, RSN		at Notre Dame	L 81–83	12–7 (4–2)	Edmund P. Joyce Center (7,888); South Bend, IN
Jan 24; 3:00 pm, ESPNU		No. 2 North Carolina	L 70–75	12–8 (4–3)	Cassell Coliseum (9,567); Blacksburg, VA
Jan 27; 8:00 pm, ACCN		No. 16 Louisville	L 83–91	12–9 (4–4)	Cassell Coliseum (7,084); Blacksburg, VA
Jan 31; 6:30 pm, ESPNU		at Pittsburgh	L 71–90	12–10 (4–5)	Peterson Events Center (10,049); Pittsburgh, PA
Feb 2; 8:00 pm, ACCN		at Syracuse	L 60-68 ^{OT}	12–11 (4–6)	Carrier Dome (21,409); Syracuse, NY
Feb 6; 4:00 pm, RSN		Clemson	W 60–57	13–11 (5–6)	Cassell Coliseum (9,567); Blacksburg, VA
Feb 9; 8:00 pm, ACCN		at No. 7 Virginia; Commonwealth Clash	L 49–67	13–12 (5–7)	John Paul Jones Arena (14,395); Charlottesville, VA
Feb 17; 9:00 pm, RSN		at No. 11 Miami (FL)	L 49–65	13–13 (5–8)	BankUnited Center (6,614); Coral Gables, FL
Feb 20; 3:00 pm, ACCN		Florida State	W 83–73	14–13 (6–8)	Cassell Coliseum (9,567); Blacksburg, VA
Feb 23; 9:00 pm, ESPNU		at Boston College	W 71–56	15–13 (7–8)	Conte Forum (1,018); Chestnut Hill, MA
Feb 28; 6:30 pm, ESPNU		at Wake Forest	W 81–74	16–13 (8–8)	LJVM Coliseum (9,404); Winston-Salem, NC
Mar 2; 7:00 pm, ESPN3		Pittsburgh	W 65–61	17–13 (9–8)	Cassell Coliseum (6,949); Blacksburg, VA
Mar 5; 4:00 pm, ACCN		No. 7 Miami (FL)	W 77–62	18–13 (10–8)	Cassell Coliseum (8,911); Blacksburg, VA
ACC tournament
Mar 9; 9:00 pm, ESPN2	(6)	vs. (11) Florida State; Second Round	W 96–85	19–13	Verizon Center (18,561); Washington, D.C.
Mar 10; 9:30 pm, ESPN	(6)	vs. (3) No. 11 Miami (FL); Quarterfinals	L 82–88	19–14	Verizon Center (20,719); Washington, D.C.
National Invitation tournament
Mar 16*; 8:00 pm, ESPNU	(3)	(6) Princeton; First Round – St. Bonaventure Bracket	W 86–81 ^{OT}	20–14	Cassell Coliseum (8,241); Blacksburg, VA
Mar 18*; 9:30 pm, ESPNU	(3)	at (2) BYU; Second Round – St. Bonaventure Bracket	L 77–80	20–15	Marriott Center (12,379); Provo, UT
*Non-conference game. ^{#}Rankings from AP Poll. (#) Tournament seedings in parentheses. All times are in Eastern Time.
