= 2015–16 Temple Owls men's basketball team =

American college basketball season

2015–16 Temple Owls men's basketball

The American regular season champions

NCAA tournament, First Round
- Conference: American Athletic Conference
- Record: 21–12 (14–4 AAC)
- Head coach: Fran Dunphy (10th season)
- Assistant coaches: Dave Duke; Dwayne Killings; Shawn Trice; Aaron McKie
- Home arena: Liacouras Center

2015–16 American Athletic Conference men's basketball standings
	Conf.				Overall
Team	W		L	PCT	W		L	PCT
Temple	14	–	4	.778	21	–	12	.636
No. 24 SMU^{*}	13	–	5	.722	25	–	5	.833
Houston	12	–	6	.667	22	–	10	.688
Cincinnati	12	–	6	.667	22	–	11	.667
Tulsa	12	–	6	.667	20	–	12	.625
UConn †	11	–	7	.611	25	–	11	.694
Memphis	8	–	10	.444	19	–	15	.559
UCF	6	–	12	.333	12	–	18	.400
East Carolina	4	–	14	.222	12	–	20	.375
South Florida	4	–	14	.222	8	–	25	.242
Tulane	3	–	15	.167	12	–	22	.353
^{*} Ineligible for postseason due to postseason ban † American Athletic Conference tournament Champions; Rankings from AP poll

The 2015–16 Temple Owls basketball team represented Temple University during the 2015–16 NCAA Division I men's basketball season. The Owls, led by tenth year head coach Fran Dunphy, played their home games at the Liacouras Center and were members the American Athletic Conference. They finished the season with a record 21–12, 14–4 in AAC play to win the regular season championship. They defeated South Florida in the quarterfinals of the AAC tournament to advance to the semifinals where they lost to UConn. They received an at-large bid as a #10 seed to the NCAA tournament where they lost in the first round to Iowa.

== Previous season ==
The Owls finished the 2014–15 season with a record 26–11, 13–5 in AAC play to finish in a tie for third place in conference. They advanced to the semifinals of the AAC tournament before losing to SMU. They received a bid to the National Invitation Tournament where they defeated Bucknell, George Washington, and Louisiana Tech to advance to the semifinals of the NIT at Madison Square Garden. There, they lost to Miami (FL).

== Departures ==
Name	Number	Pos.	Height	Weight	Year	Hometown	Notes
Will Cummings	2	G	6'2"	175	Senior	Jacksonville, FL	Graduated, signed with the Houston Rockets
Jesse Morgan	3	G	6'5"	190	RS Senior	Philadelphia, PA	Graduated
Nick Pendergrast	13	F	6'5"	180	RS Junior	Bridgewater, CT	Graduated & transferred to Nova Southeastern
Jimmy McDonnell	41	F	6'10"	210	Senior	Jackson, NJ	Graduated

== Incoming recruits ==
College recruiting
Name	Hometown	School	Height	Weight	Commit date
Levan Alston; SG	Haverford, Pa	The Haverford School	6 ft 4 in (1.93 m)	175 lb (79 kg)	Nov 12, 2014
Levan Alston; SG	Recruit ratings: Scout: Rivals: (82)				
Ernest Aflakpui; C	Radnor, Pa	Archbishop Carroll High School	6 ft 10 in (2.08 m)	220 lb (100 kg)	Oct 12, 2014
Ernest Aflakpui; C	Recruit ratings: Scout: Rivals: (80)				
Trey Lowe; SG	Ewing, NJ	Ewing High School	6 ft 5 in (1.96 m)	165 lb (75 kg)	Aug 7, 2014
Trey Lowe; SG	Recruit ratings: Scout: Rivals: (80)				
Overall recruit ranking:
Note: In many cases, Scout, Rivals, 247Sports, On3, and ESPN may conflict in their listings of height and weight.; In these cases, the average was taken. ESPN grades are on a 100-point scale.; Sources: "2015 Team Ranking". Rivals.

=== Recruiting class of 2016 ===
College recruiting (2016)
Name	Hometown	School	Height	Weight	Commit date
Quinton Rose; SG	Rochester, NY	Greece Athena High School	6 ft 6 in (1.98 m)	170 lb (77 kg)	Aug 7, 2015
Quinton Rose; SG	Recruit ratings: Scout: Rivals: (80)				
Overall recruit ranking:
Note: In many cases, Scout, Rivals, 247Sports, On3, and ESPN may conflict in their listings of height and weight.; In these cases, the average was taken. ESPN grades are on a 100-point scale.; Sources: "2016 Team Ranking". Rivals.

== Roster ==
2015–16 Temple Owls men's basketball team
Players
Coaches

Pos.	#	Name	Height	Weight	Year	Previous school	Hometown
F	0	Obi Enechionyia	6 ft 8 in (2.03 m)	220 lb (100 kg)	So	St. James School	Springfield, VA
G	1	Josh Brown	6 ft 3 in (1.91 m)	185 lb (84 kg)	Jr	St. Anthony (NJ)	Irvington, NJ
G	3	Shizz Alston	6 ft 4 in (1.93 m)	170 lb (77 kg)	Fr	Haverford School	Philadelphia, PA
G/F	4	Daniel Dingle	6 ft 7 in (2.01 m)	235 lb (107 kg)	RS Jr	St. Raymond	Bronx, NY
F	10	Mark Williams	6 ft 8 in (2.03 m)	240 lb (109 kg)	Jr	Montrose Christian	Cleveland, OH
G	11	Trey Lowe	6 ft 6 in (1.98 m)	165 lb (75 kg)	Fr	Ewing	Ewing, NJ
F	15	Jaylen Bond	6 ft 8 in (2.03 m)	240 lb (109 kg)	RS Sr	Texas; Plymouth-Whitemarsh	Philadelphia, PA
G	22	Mike Robbins (W)	6 ft 4 in (1.93 m)	185 lb (84 kg)	Jr	Lower Merion	Wynnewood, PA
F/C	23	Devontae Watson	6 ft 10 in (2.08 m)	215 lb (98 kg)	Sr	Lincoln Park Performing Arts	Ambridge, PA
C	24	Ernest Aflakpui	6 ft 10 in (2.08 m)	235 lb (107 kg)	Fr	Archbishop Carroll	Accra, Ghana
G	25	Quenton DeCosey	6 ft 5 in (1.96 m)	180 lb (82 kg)	Sr	St. Joseph, Metuchen, NJ	Union, NJ
G	32	Ayan Nunez de Carvalho	6 ft 5 in (1.96 m)	190 lb (86 kg)	Fr	Escuela Normal Superior	Paraná, Argentina
G	34	Devin Coleman	6 ft 2 in (1.88 m)	205 lb (93 kg)	RS Sr	Clemson; Friends' Central	Philadelphia, PA
F	50	Chima Nwakpuda	6 ft 4 in (1.93 m)	215 lb (98 kg)	Sr	Millersville; Shipley	Philadelphia, PA

Head coach

- Fran Dunphy

Assistant coach(es)

- Dave Duke
- Dwayne Killings
- Shawn Trice
- Aaron McKie

Legend

- (C) Team captain
- (S) Suspended
- (I) Ineligible
- (W) Walk-on
- Injured
- Current redshirt

Roster

== Schedule ==
Date time, TV	Rank^{#}	Opponent^{#}	Result	Record	Site (attendance) city, state
Regular season
November 13, 2015*; 7:00 pm, CBSSN		vs. No. 1 North Carolina; Veterans Classic	L 67–91	0–1	Alumni Hall (5,710); Annapolis, MD
November 19, 2015*; 11:30 am, ESPN2		vs. Minnesota; Puerto Rico Tip-Off Quarterfinals	W 75–70	1–1	Roberto Clemente Coliseum (1,601); San Juan, PR
November 20, 2015*; 1:00 pm, ESPN2		vs. No. 22 Butler; Puerto Rico Tip-Off Semifinals	L 69–74	1–2	Roberto Clemente Coliseum (1,814); San Juan, PR
November 22, 2015*; 4:30 pm, ESPNU		vs. No. 16 Utah; Puerto Rico Tip-Off 3rd place game	L 68–74	1–3	Roberto Clemente Coliseum (5,309); San Juan, PR
November 29, 2015*; 5:00 pm, ESPN3		Delaware	W 69–50	2–3	Liacouras Center (4,706); Philadelphia, PA
December 2, 2015*; 7:00 pm, ESPN3		Fairleigh Dickinson	W 79–70	3–3	Liacouras Center (4,034); Philadelphia, PA
December 5, 2015*; 12:30 pm, CBS		at Wisconsin	L 60–76	3–4	Kohl Center (17,287); Madison, WI
December 9, 2015*; 7:00 pm		at Penn; Philadelphia Big 5	W 77–73	4–4	Palestra (4,378); Philadelphia, PA
December 13, 2015*; 4:00 pm, CBSSN		Saint Joseph's; Rivalry/Philadelphia Big 5	L 65–66 ^{OT}	4–5	Liacouras Center (6,194); Philadelphia, PA
December 19, 2015*; 3:00 pm, ESPN3		Delaware State	W 78–63	5–5	Liacouras Center (4,578); Philadelphia, PA
December 29, 2015; 3:00 pm, ESPN2		at No. 22 Cincinnati	W 77–70	6–5 (1–0)	Fifth Third Arena (10,029); Cincinnati, OH
January 2, 2016; 12:00 pm, ESPNews		Houston	L 50–77	6–6 (1–1)	Liacouras Center (5,374); Philadelphia, PA
January 5, 2016; 8:00 pm, CBSSN		at No. 23 UConn	W 55–53	7–6 (2–1)	XL Center (11,319); Hartford, CT
January 9, 2016; 9:00 pm, ESPNews		East Carolina	W 78–60	8–6 (3–1)	Liacouras Center (4,524); Philadelphia, PA
January 13, 2016; 8:00 pm, CBSSN		at Memphis	L 65–67	8–7 (3–2)	FedEx Forum (12,247); Memphis, TN
January 16, 2016; 12:00 pm, ESPNU		Cincinnati	W 67–65 ^{2OT}	9–7 (4–2)	Liacouras Center (7,481); Philadelphia, PA
January 20, 2016*; 7:00 pm, CBSSN		vs. La Salle	W 62–49	10–7	Palestra (8,030); Philadelphia, PA
January 24, 2016; 12:00 pm, ESPN2		No. 8 SMU	W 89–80	11–7 (5–2)	Liacouras Center (6,096); Philadelphia, PA
January 27, 2016; 7:00 pm, ESPN3		at East Carolina	L 61–64	11–8 (5–3)	Williams Arena (4,196); Greenville, NC
January 31, 2016; 2:00 pm, CBSSN		at South Florida	W 70–63	12–8 (6–3)	USF Sun Dome (2,875); Tampa, FL
February 4, 2016; 7:00 pm, ESPNU		Tulsa	W 83–79 ^{OT}	13–8 (7–3)	Liacouras Center (5,929); Philadelphia, PA
February 6, 2016; 12:00 pm, ESPNU		at UCF	W 62–60	14–8 (8–3)	CFE Arena (3,654); Orlando, FL
February 11, 2016; 7:00 pm, ESPN2		UConn	W 63–58	15–8 (9–3)	Liacouras Center (8,316); Philadelphia, PA
February 14, 2016; 3:00 pm, CBSSN		South Florida	W 75–63	16–8 (10–3)	Liacouras Center (7,560); Philadelphia, PA
February 17, 2016*; 7:00 pm, ESPN2		No. 1 Villanova; Philadelphia Big 5	L 67–83	16–9	Liacouras Center (10,472); Philadelphia, PA
February 21, 2016; 7:00 pm, ESPNews		at Houston	W 69–66	17–9 (11–3)	Hofheinz Pavilion (4,466); Houston, TX
February 23, 2016; 7:00 pm, ESPNews		at Tulsa	L 55–74	17–10 (11–4)	Reynolds Center (4,827); Tulsa, OK
February 27, 2016; 12:00 pm, ESPNews		UCF	W 63–61	18–10 (12–4)	Liacouras Center (7,569); Philadelphia, PA
March 3, 2016; 7:00 pm, ESPNU		Memphis	W 72–62	19–10 (13–4)	Liacouras Center; Philadelphia, PA
March 6, 2016; 3:00 pm, ESPN3		at Tulane	W 64–56	20–10 (14–4)	Devlin Fieldhouse; New Orleans, LA
American Athletic Tournament
March 11, 2016; 12:00 pm, ESPN2	(1)	vs. (9) South Florida; Quarterfinals	W 79–62	21–10	Amway Center (7,475); Orlando, FL
March 12, 2016; 3:10 pm, ESPN2	(1)	vs. (5) UConn; Semifinals	L 62–77	21–11	Amway Center (7,465); Orlando, FL
NCAA tournament
March 18, 2016*; 3:10 pm, truTV	(10 S)	vs. (7 S) Iowa; First Round	L 70–72 ^{OT}	21–12	Barclays Center (17,333); Brooklyn, NY
*Non-conference game. ^{#}Rankings from AP Poll. (#) Tournament seedings in parentheses. S=South Region. All times are in Eastern Time.
