= 2015–16 SMU Mustangs men's basketball team =

American college basketball season

2015–16 SMU Mustangs men's basketball

Las Vegas Classic Champions
- Conference: American Athletic Conference

Ranking
- AP: No. 24
- Record: 25–5 (13–5 AAC)
- Head coach: Larry Brown (4th season)
- Assistant coaches: Tim Jankovich; K. T. Turner; Jerry Hobbie
- Home arena: Moody Coliseum

2015–16 American Athletic Conference men's basketball standings
	Conf.				Overall
Team	W		L	PCT	W		L	PCT
Temple	14	–	4	.778	21	–	12	.636
No. 24 SMU^{*}	13	–	5	.722	25	–	5	.833
Houston	12	–	6	.667	22	–	10	.688
Cincinnati	12	–	6	.667	22	–	11	.667
Tulsa	12	–	6	.667	20	–	12	.625
UConn †	11	–	7	.611	25	–	11	.694
Memphis	8	–	10	.444	19	–	15	.559
UCF	6	–	12	.333	12	–	18	.400
East Carolina	4	–	14	.222	12	–	20	.375
South Florida	4	–	14	.222	8	–	25	.242
Tulane	3	–	15	.167	12	–	22	.353
^{*} Ineligible for postseason due to postseason ban † American Athletic Conference tournament Champions; Rankings from AP poll

The 2015–16 SMU Mustangs men's basketball team represented Southern Methodist University (SMU) during the 2015–16 NCAA Division I men's basketball season. The Mustangs were led by fourth year head coach Larry Brown and played their home games on their campus in University Park, Texas at Moody Coliseum. They were members of the American Athletic Conference. The Mustangs finished the season with a record of 25–5, 13–5 in AAC play to finish in second place in conference.

Due to multiple violations, including academic fraud and unethical conduct, SMU was ineligible for all postseason play including the AAC tournament and NCAA tournament. Additionally, head coach Larry Brown was suspended for nine games.

== Previous season ==
The Mustangs finished the 2014–15 season with a record of 27–7, 15–3 in AAC play to win the AAC regular season championship. They defeated East Carolina, Temple, and UConn to win the AAC tournament. They received the conference's automatic bid to the NCAA tournament as a #6 seed where they lost on a controversial goaltending call in the Second round to UCLA.

== Departures ==
Name	Number	Pos.	Height	Weight	Year	Hometown	Notes
Ryan Manuel	1	G	6'4"	185	Senior	Houston, TX	Graduated
Yanick Moreira	2	C	6'11"	220	Senior	Luanda, Angola	Graduated
Kevin Dunleavy	10	G	6'3"	180	Senior	New Providence, NJ	Graduated
Crandall Head	13	G	6'4"	180	RS Senior	Matteson, IL	Graduated
Cannen Cunningham	15	C	6'10"	225	Senior	Arlington, TX	Graduated

=== Incoming transfers ===
Name	Number	Pos.	Height	Weight	Year	Hometown	Notes
Semi Ojeleye	33	F	6'8"	230	Junior	Ottawa, KS	Transferred from Duke in January during the 2014–15 season. Under NCAA transfer rules, Semi Ojeleye has to sit out until January and will be eligible to start in January during the 2015–16 season. Semi Ojeleye has one and a half years of remaining eligibility.

== 2015 recruiting class ==
College recruiting information
Name	Hometown	School	Height	Weight	Commit date
Shake Milton; PG	Owasso, OK	Owasso High School	6 ft 4 in (1.93 m)	190 lb (86 kg)	Oct 15, 2014
Shake Milton; PG	Recruit ratings: Scout: Rivals: (84)				
Sedrick Barefield; PG	Corona, CA	Centennial High School	6 ft 4 in (1.93 m)	185 lb (84 kg)	Feb 17, 2014
Sedrick Barefield; PG	Recruit ratings: Scout: Rivals: (79)				
Jarrey Foster; SF	Houston, TX	North Shore High School	6 ft 4 in (1.93 m)	180 lb (82 kg)	Oct 8, 2014
Jarrey Foster; SF	Recruit ratings: Scout: Rivals: (78)				
Overall recruit ranking:
Note: In many cases, Scout, Rivals, 247Sports, On3, and ESPN may conflict in their listings of height and weight.; In these cases, the average was taken. ESPN grades are on a 100-point scale.; Sources: "2015 SMU Recruiting List". Rivals.; "2015 SMU Recruiting List". Scout.; "2015 SMU Recruiting List". ESPN.; "Scout.com Team Recruiting Rankings". Scout.; "2015 Team Ranking". Rivals.

== Roster ==
2015–16 SMU Mustangs men's basketball team
Players
Coaches

Pos.	#	Name	Height	Weight	Year	Previous school	Hometown
F	0	Ben Moore	6 ft 8 in (2.03 m)	205 lb (93 kg)	Jr	Bolingbrook HS	Bolingbrook, Illinois
G	1	Shake Milton	6 ft 5 in (1.96 m)	195 lb (88 kg)	Fr	Owasso High School	Owasso, Oklahoma
G	2	Sedrick Barefield	6 ft 2 in (1.88 m)	190 lb (86 kg)	Fr	Centennial HS	Corona, California
G	3	Sterling Brown	6 ft 6 in (1.98 m)	200 lb (91 kg)	Jr	Proviso East HS	Maywood, Illinois
G	4	Keith Frazier	6 ft 5 in (1.96 m)	190 lb (86 kg)	Jr	Kimball HS	Dallas, Texas
F	5	Markus Kennedy	6 ft 9 in (2.06 m)	245 lb (111 kg)	RS Sr	Brewster Academy; Villanova	Philadelphia, Pennsylvania
G	10	Jarrey Foster	6 ft 5 in (1.96 m)	200 lb (91 kg)	Fr	North Shore HS	Houston, Texas
G	11	Nic Moore	5 ft 9 in (1.75 m)	170 lb (77 kg)	RS Sr	Warsaw Community HS	Winona Lake, Indiana
F	14	Courtland Sutton	6 ft 4 in (1.93 m)	215 lb (98 kg)	RS Fr	Brenham High School	Brenham, Texas
G	21	Ben Emelogu	6 ft 6 in (1.98 m)	205 lb (93 kg)	Jr	South Grand Prairie HS; Virginia Tech	Grand Prairie, Texas
G	22	Jonathan Wilfong	6 ft 2 in (1.88 m)	185 lb (84 kg)	Jr	Memphis University School	Memphis, Tennessee
F	23	Jordan Tolbert	6 ft 7 in (2.01 m)	240 lb (109 kg)	RS Sr	All Saints Episcopal School; Texas Tech	Fort Worth, Texas
F	33	Semi Ojeleye	6 ft 8 in (2.03 m)	230 lb (104 kg)	Jr	Ottawa Sr. HS; Duke	Ottawa, Kansas

Head coach

- Larry Brown (North Carolina)

Assistant coach(es)

- Tim Jankovich (Kansas State)
- K. T. Turner (Oklahoma City)
- Jerry Hobbie (Fordham)

Legend

- (C) Team captain
- (S) Suspended
- (I) Ineligible
- (W) Walk-on
- Injured
- Current redshirt

Roster

== Schedule ==
SMU has been invited to play in the Las Vegas Classic, where they will play against two the following three teams: Colorado, Penn State, Kent State. Two on-campus games will precede the Las Vegas-hosted games. The Mustangs will host Gonzaga, Michigan, Brown, and Yale. SMU will also play true road games at Stanford and TCU.

SMU's American Athletic Conference schedule will include home-and-home matchups with Cincinnati, UConn, East Carolina, Houston, Memphis, USF, Tulane, and Tulsa. The Mustangs will also host UCF and play a true road game at Temple during its conference schedule.

Date time, TV	Rank^{#}	Opponent^{#}	Result	Record	Site (attendance) city, state
Regular season
November 14, 2015*; 7:00 pm, ESPN3		Sam Houston State	W 85–50	1–0	Moody Coliseum (6,852); Dallas, TX
November 19, 2015*; 10:30 pm, ESPN2		at Stanford	W 85–70	2–0	Maples Pavilion (3,687); Stanford, CA
November 22, 2015*; 3:30 pm, ESPNews		Yale	W 71–69	3–0	Moody Coliseum (6,852); Dallas, TX
November 29, 2015*; 2:00 pm, TWCS	No. 25	Brown	W 77–69	4–0	Moody Coliseum (6,852); Dallas, TX
December 2, 2015*; 7:00 pm, FSSW	No. 22	at TCU	W 75–70	5–0	Schollmaier Arena (4,672); Fort Worth, TX
December 5, 2015*; 12:30 pm, TWCS	No. 22	New Hampshire	W 98–44	6–0	Moody Coliseum (6,754); Dallas, TX
December 8, 2015*; 8:00 pm, ESPN2	No. 19	Michigan	W 82–58	7–0	Moody Coliseum (7,245); Dallas, TX
December 16, 2015*; 7:00 pm, TWCS	No. 18	Nicholls State; Las Vegas Classic Regional Round	W 86–42	8–0	Moody Coliseum (6,460); Dallas, TX
December 17, 2015*; 6:00 pm, TWCS	No. 18	Hampton; Las Vegas Classic Regional Round	W 105–72	9–0	Moody Coliseum (6,329); Dallas, TX
December 22, 2015*; 7:00 pm	No. 18	vs. Kent State; Las Vegas Classic Semifinals	W 90–74	10–0	Orleans Arena (2,120); Paradise, NV
December 23, 2015*; 9:30 pm, FS1	No. 18	vs. Colorado; Las Vegas Classic Championship	W 70–66	11–0	Orleans Arena (2,154); Paradise, NV
December 29, 2015; 4:00 pm, ESPN2	No. 17	at Tulsa	W 81–69	12–0 (1–0)	Reynolds Center (5,364); Tulsa, OK
January 2, 2016; 6:30 pm, ESPNews	No. 17	South Florida	W 72–58	13–0 (2–0)	Moody Coliseum (6,852); Dallas, TX
January 7, 2016; 6:00 pm, ESPN	No. 15	Cincinnati	W 59–57	14–0 (3–0)	Moody Coliseum (6,971); Dallas, TX
January 10, 2016; 3:00 pm, ESPNU	No. 15	UCF	W 88–73	15–0 (4–0)	Moody Coliseum (6,952); Dallas, TX
January 13, 2016; 5:15 pm, ESPNews	No. 10	at East Carolina	W 79–55	16–0 (5–0)	Williams Arena (6,022); Greenville, NC
January 17, 2016; 2:00 pm, ESPN3	No. 10	at Tulane	W 60–45	17–0 (6–0)	Devlin Fieldhouse; New Orleans, LA
January 19, 2016; 8:00 pm, ESPNU	No. 8	Houston	W 77–73	18–0 (7–0)	Moody Coliseum (7,059); Dallas, TX
January 24, 2016; 11:00 am, ESPN2	No. 8	at Temple	L 80–89	18–1 (7–1)	Liacouras Center (6,096); Philadelphia, PA
January 30, 2016; 7:00 pm, ESPNU	No. 13	Memphis	W 80–68	19–1 (8–1)	Moody Coliseum (7,205); Dallas, TX
February 1, 2016; 7:00 pm, CBSSN	No. 12	at Houston	L 68–71	19–2 (8–2)	Hofheinz Pavilion (6,195); Houston, TX
February 7, 2016; 1:00 pm, CBSSN	No. 12	at South Florida	W 92–58	20–2 (9–2)	USF Sun Dome (2,857); Tampa, FL
February 10, 2016; 8:00 pm, CBSSN	No. 16	Tulsa	L 77–82	20–3 (9–3)	Moody Coliseum (6,852); Dallas, TX
February 13, 2016*; 9:00 pm, ESPN2	No. 16	Gonzaga	W 69–60	21–3	Moody Coliseum (7,249); Dallas, TX
February 18, 2016; 6:00 pm, ESPN2	No. 21	at UConn	L 62–68	21–4 (9–4)	XL Center (15,564); Hartford, CT
February 21, 2016; 1:00 pm, ESPNews	No. 21	East Carolina	W 74–63	22–4 (10–4)	Moody Coliseum (6,852); Dallas, TX
February 25, 2016; 6:00 pm, ESPN2	No. 24	at Memphis	W 69–62	23–4 (11–4)	FedEx Forum (13,546); Memphis, TN
February 28, 2016; 2:00 pm, CBSSN	No. 24	Tulane	W 74–53	24–4 (12–4)	Moody Coliseum (6,781); Dallas, TX
March 3, 2016; 8:00 pm, ESPN2	No. 24	UConn	W 80–54	25–4 (13–4)	Moody Coliseum (7,303); Dallas, TX
March 6, 2015; 11:00 am, CBS	No. 24	at Cincinnati	L 54–61	25–5 (13–5)	Fifth Third Arena (13,176); Cincinnati, OH
*Non-conference game. ^{#}Rankings from AP Poll. (#) Tournament seedings in parentheses. All times are in Central Time.

== Rankings ==
Ranking movements Legend: ██ Increase in ranking ██ Decrease in ranking RV = Received votes
	Week																			
Poll	Pre	1	2	3	4	5	6	7	8	9	10	11	12	13	14	15	16	17	18	Final
AP	RV	RV	25	22	22	19	18	18	17	15	10	8	13	12	16	21	24	24	25	24

SMU is ineligible to be ranked in the Coaches poll due to sanctions stemming from academic fraud and unethical conduct.

== Midseason recognition ==
On February 1, 2016, Nic Moore was named one of 10 finalists for the Bob Cousy Point Guard of the Year Award. He was named to the 35-man midseason watchlist for the Naismith Trophy on February 11.
