= 2015–16 Cornell Big Red men's basketball team =

American college basketball season

2015–16 Cornell Big Red men's basketball
- Conference: Ivy League
- Record: 10–18 (3–11 Ivy)
- Head coach: Bill Courtney (6th season)
- Assistant coaches: Craig Carter; Jon Jaques; Dave Metzendorf
- Home arena: Newman Arena

2015–16 Ivy League men's basketball standings
	Conf.				Overall
Team	W		L	PCT	W		L	PCT
x-Yale †	13	–	1	.929	23	–	7	.767
Princeton	12	–	2	.857	22	–	7	.759
Columbia	10	–	4	.714	25	–	10	.714
Harvard	6	–	8	.429	14	–	16	.467
Penn	5	–	9	.357	11	–	17	.393
Dartmouth	4	–	10	.286	10	–	18	.357
Cornell	3	–	11	.214	10	–	18	.357
Brown	3	–	11	.214	8	–	20	.286
x – Ivy League champions † – NCAA Tournament participant

The 2015–16 Cornell Big Red men's basketball team represented Cornell University during the 2015–16 NCAA Division I men's basketball season. The Big Red, led by sixth year head coach Bill Courtney, played their home games at Newman Arena and were members of the Ivy League. They finished the season 10–18, 3–11 in Ivy League play to finish in a tie for seventh place.

On March 14, 2016, Cornell fired head coach Bill Courtney. He finished at Cornell with a six-year record of 60–113. On April 18, the school hired Brian Earl as head coach.

== Previous season ==
The Big Red finished the season 13–17, 5–9 in Ivy League play to finish in a tie for fifth place.

== Departures ==
Name	Number	Pos.	Height	Weight	Year	Hometown	Notes
Galal Cancer	3	G	6'2"	180	Senior	Albany, NY	Graduated
Dave LaMore	4	F/C	6'9"	225	Senior	Whitmore, MI	Graduated
Devin Cherry	13	G	6'3"	185	Senior	Meridian, MS	Graduated
Shonn Miller	32	F	6'7"	210	Senior	Euclid, OH	Graduated
Nenad Tomic	35	F	6'7"	220	Senior	North Royalton, OH	Graduated
Deion Giddens	50	F/C	6'9"	202	Senior	Bitburg, Germany	Graduated

== Recruiting ==
College recruiting information
Name	Hometown	School	Height	Weight	Commit date
Stone Gettings #66 PF	Los Angeles, CA	Loyola High School	6 ft 8 in (2.03 m)	205 lb (93 kg)	Oct 26, 2014
Stone Gettings #66 PF	Recruit ratings: Scout: Rivals: (66)				
Donovan Wright; SG	Blairstown, NJ	Blair Academy	6 ft 5 in (1.96 m)	N/A	Jul 7, 2014
Donovan Wright; SG	Recruit ratings: Scout: Rivals: (NR)				
Joel Davis; SG	Goldsboro, NC	Wayne Country Day School	6 ft 3 in (1.91 m)	N/A	Jul 8, 2014
Joel Davis; SG	Recruit ratings: Scout: Rivals: (NR)				
Troy Whiteside; SG	Knoxville, TN	Webb School Of Knoxville	6 ft 4 in (1.93 m)	175 lb (79 kg)	Aug 31, 2014
Troy Whiteside; SG	Recruit ratings: Scout: Rivals: (NR)				
Matt Morgan; PF	Concord, NC	Cox Mill High School	6 ft 2 in (1.88 m)	N/A	Sep 12, 2014
Matt Morgan; PF	Recruit ratings: Scout: Rivals: (NR)				
Joseph Ritter; PF	Dallas, TX	Woodrow Wilson High School	6 ft 8 in (2.03 m)	230 lb (100 kg)	Oct 1, 2014
Joseph Ritter; PF	Recruit ratings: Scout: Rivals: (NR)				
Xavier Eaglin; SF	Dayton, TX	Dayton High School	6 ft 6 in (1.98 m)	185 lb (84 kg)	Feb 10, 2015
Xavier Eaglin; SF	Recruit ratings: Scout: Rivals: (NR)				
Overall recruit ranking:
Note: In many cases, Scout, Rivals, 247Sports, On3, and ESPN may conflict in their listings of height and weight.; In these cases, the average was taken. ESPN grades are on a 100-point scale.; Sources: "2015 Team Ranking". Rivals.

=== Recruiting class of 2016 ===
College recruiting information (2016)
Name	Hometown	School	Height	Weight	Commit date
Josh Warren #114 PF	Downingtown, PA	Downingtown West High School	6 ft 8 in (2.03 m)	210 lb (95 kg)	Sep 20, 2015
Josh Warren #114 PF	Recruit ratings: Scout: Rivals: (55)				
Jerry Ben; PF	New Haven, MI	New Haven High School	6 ft 9 in (2.06 m)	N/A	Apr 1, 2015
Jerry Ben; PF	Recruit ratings: Scout: Rivals: (NR)				
Overall recruit ranking:
Note: In many cases, Scout, Rivals, 247Sports, On3, and ESPN may conflict in their listings of height and weight.; In these cases, the average was taken. ESPN grades are on a 100-point scale.; Sources: "2016 Team Ranking". Rivals.

== Roster ==
2015–16 Cornell Big Red men's basketball team
Players
Coaches

Pos.	#	Name	Height	Weight	Year	Previous school	Hometown
G	0	David Onuorah	6 ft 9 in (2.06 m)	230 lb (104 kg)	Jr	Marist HS	Lithonia, GA
G	1	Darryl Smith	6 ft 2 in (1.88 m)	180 lb (82 kg)	Jr	Blue Ridge School	Chesapeake, VA
F	3	Donovan Wright	6 ft 5 in (1.96 m)	200 lb (91 kg)	Fr	Blair Academy	Easton, PA
G	4	Troy Whiteside	6 ft 4 in (1.93 m)	185 lb (84 kg)	Fr	The Webb School	Knoxville, TN
G	5	Robert Hatter	6 ft 2 in (1.88 m)	180 lb (82 kg)	Jr	Westside HS	Houston, TX
G	10	Matt Morgan	6 ft 3 in (1.91 m)	180 lb (82 kg)	Fr	Cox Mill HS	Concord, NC
G	11	Desmond Fleming	5 ft 11 in (1.8 m)	180 lb (82 kg)	Jr	The Woodlands College Park HS	The Woodlands, TX
F	12	Jordan Abdur-Ra'oof	6 ft 7 in (2.01 m)	205 lb (93 kg)	So	Gonzaga College HS	Rockville, MD
F	13	Stone Gettings	6 ft 9 in (2.06 m)	230 lb (104 kg)	Fr	Loyola HS	Calabasas, CA
C	15	Braxston Bunce	6 ft 11 in (2.11 m)	250 lb (113 kg)	Sr	Kelowna Secondary School	Kelowna, BC
G/F	20	Will Bathurst	6 ft 3 in (1.91 m)	180 lb (82 kg)	So	Olean HS	Olean, NY
G	21	Kyle Brown	6 ft 2 in (1.88 m)	180 lb (82 kg)	So	Newport HS	Bellevue, WA
G	22	Robert Mischler	6 ft 3 in (1.91 m)	183 lb (83 kg)	Sr	Marian HS	Mishawaka, IN
G	23	Joel Davis	6 ft 3 in (1.91 m)	170 lb (77 kg)	Fr	Wayne Country Day School	Goldsboro, NC
G/F	24	Pat Smith	6 ft 5 in (1.96 m)	195 lb (88 kg)	Fr	Archbishop Wood Catholic HS	Chalfont, PA
G	25	JoJo Fallas	5 ft 11 in (1.8 m)	175 lb (79 kg)	Jr	Shalhevet HS	Los Angeles, CA
F	30	Joseph Bayless	6 ft 8 in (2.03 m)	240 lb (109 kg)	Fr	Woodrow Wilson HS	Dallas, TX
G	32	Jack Gordon	6 ft 5 in (1.96 m)	185 lb (84 kg)	Fr	St. Mark's School	Dallas, TX
F	34	Xavier Eaglin	6 ft 7 in (2.01 m)	205 lb (93 kg)	Fr	Dayton HS	Raywood, TX

Head coach

- Bill Courtney (Bucknell)

Assistant coach(es)

- Craig Carter (Rutgers)
- Jon Jaques (Cornell)
- Dave Metzendorf (Ithaca)

Legend

- (C) Team captain
- (S) Suspended
- (I) Ineligible
- (W) Walk-on
- Injured
- Current redshirt

Roster

== Schedule ==
Date time, TV	Opponent	Result	Record	Site (attendance) city, state
Non-conference regular season
11/13/2015*; 7:00 pm, ESPN3	at Georgia Tech	L 81–116	0–1	Hank McCamish Pavilion; Atlanta, GA
11/16/2015*; 7:00 pm	at Colgate	W 101–98 ^{2OT}	1–1	Cotterell Court (814); Hamilton, NY
11/18/2015*; 6:00 pm	Binghamton	W 76–59	2–1	Newman Arena (1,204); Ithaca, NY
11/21/2015*; 3:15 pm, ESPN3	at Canisius	L 62–87	2–2	Koessler Athletic Center (1,310); Buffalo, NY
11/23/2015*; 8:30 pm	Penn State Harrisburg	W 76–47	3–2	Newman Arena (991); Ithaca, NY
11/25/2015*; 7:00 pm, ESPN3	at Pittsburgh	L 49–93	3–3	Peterson Events Center (7,720); Pittsburgh, PA
11/29/2015*; 2:00 pm	at UMass Lowell	L 77–80	3–4	Costello Athletic Center (407); Lowell, MA
12/01/2015*; 7:00 pm	Siena	W 81–80	4–4	Newman Arena (1,017); Ithaca, NY
12/05/2015*; 2:00 pm	Lafayette	W 85–69	5–4	Newman Arena (1,934); Ithaca, NY
12/19/2015*; 12:00 pm, RSN	at Syracuse	L 46–67	5–5	Carrier Dome (18,295); Syracuse, NY
12/22/2015*; 6:00 pm	Monmouth	L 69–78	5–6	Newman Arena (2,034); Ithaca, NY
12/28/2015*; 7:00 pm	at Saint Peter's	W 65–62	6–6	Yanitelli Center (611); Jersey City, NJ
01/02/2016*; 7:00 pm	Albany	L 70–75	6–7	Newman Arena (1,421); Ithaca, NY
01/06/2016*; 7:00 pm	at Howard	W 84–81	7–7	Burr Gymnasium (305); Washington, D.C.
Ivy League regular season
01/16/2016; 7:00 pm	at Columbia	L 70–74	7–8 (0–1)	Levien Gymnasium (2,236); New York City, NY
01/23/2016; 4:00 pm	Columbia	L 68–79	7–9 (0–2)	Newman Arena (3,935); Ithaca, NY
01/29/2016; 7:00 pm	at Harvard	W 77–65	8–9 (1–2)	Lavietes Pavilion (1,712); Cambridge, MA
01/30/2016; 7:00 pm	at Dartmouth	W 77–73	9–9 (2–2)	Leede Arena (899); Hanover, NH
02/05/2016; 7:00 pm	at Brown	L 80–86	9–10 (2–3)	Pizzitola Sports Center (738); Providence, RI
02/06/2016; 7:00 pm	at Yale	L 52–83	9–11 (2–4)	John J. Lee Amphitheater (1,684); New Haven, CT
02/12/2016; 6:00 pm, ASN	Princeton	L 56–85	9–12 (2–5)	Newman Arena; Ithaca, NY
02/13/2016; 6:00 pm	Penn	L 84–92	9–13 (2–6)	Newman Arena; Ithaca, NY
02/19/2016; 7:00 pm	Dartmouth	L 66–78	9–14 (2–7)	Newman Arena (1,098); Ithaca, NY
02/20/2016; 6:00 pm	Harvard	L 74–76	9–15 (2–8)	Newman Arena (1,938); Ithaca, NY
02/26/2016; 7:00 pm	at Penn	L 67–79	9–16 (2–9)	The Palestra (2,058); Philadelphia, PA
02/27/2016; 6:00 pm	at Princeton	L 60–74	9–17 (2–10)	Jadwin Gymnasium (2,992); Princeton, NJ
03/04/2016; 6:00 pm, ASN	Yale	L 64–88	9–18 (2–11)	Newman Arena (1,734); Ithaca, NY
03/05/2016; 6:00 pm	Brown	W 75–71	10–18 (3–11)	Newman Arena (1,629); Ithaca, NY
*Non-conference game. ^{#}Rankings from AP Poll. (#) Tournament seedings in parentheses. All times are in Eastern Time.
