= 2015–16 Dartmouth Big Green men's basketball team =

American college basketball season

2015–16 Dartmouth Big Green men's basketball
- Conference: Ivy League
- Record: 10–18 (4–10 Ivy)
- Head coach: Paul Cormier (6th season)
- Assistant coaches: Jean Bain; James Cormier
- Home arena: Leede Arena

2015–16 Ivy League men's basketball standings
	Conf.				Overall
Team	W		L	PCT	W		L	PCT
x-Yale †	13	–	1	.929	23	–	7	.767
Princeton	12	–	2	.857	22	–	7	.759
Columbia	10	–	4	.714	25	–	10	.714
Harvard	6	–	8	.429	14	–	16	.467
Penn	5	–	9	.357	11	–	17	.393
Dartmouth	4	–	10	.286	10	–	18	.357
Cornell	3	–	11	.214	10	–	18	.357
Brown	3	–	11	.214	8	–	20	.286
x – Ivy League champions † – NCAA Tournament participant

The 2015–16 Dartmouth Big Green men's basketball team represented Dartmouth College during the 2015–16 NCAA Division I men's basketball season. The Big Green, led by sixth-year head coach Paul Cormier, played their home games at Leede Arena in Hanover, New Hampshire and were members of the Ivy League. The Big Green finished the season 10–18, 4–10 in Ivy League play to finish in sixth place.

On March 21, 2016 head coach Paul Cormier was fired. He finished at Dartmouth with a six-year record of 54–116. On April 25, the school hired David McLaughlin as head coach.

== Previous season ==
The Big Green finished the 2014–15 season 14–15, 7–7 in Ivy League play to finish in fourth place. They were invited to the CollegeInsider.com Tournament, their first postseason appearance since 1959, where they lost in the first round to Canisius.

== Departures ==
Name	Number	Pos.	Height	Weight	Year	Hometown	Notes
Alex Mitola	11	G	5'11"	170	Junior	Florham Park, NJ	Graduate transferred to George Washington
Gabas Maldunas	12	F/C	6'9"	230	Senior	Panevėžys, Lithuania	Graduated
John Golden	23	G/F	6'6"	200	Senior	Freehold, NJ	Graduated

== Recruiting ==
College recruiting information
Name	Hometown	School	Height	Weight	Commit date
Evan Boudreaux #40 PF	Lake Forest, IL	Lake Forest High School	6 ft 8 in (2.03 m)	220 lb (100 kg)	Oct 24, 2014
Evan Boudreaux #40 PF	Recruit ratings: Scout: Rivals: (79)				
Michael Stones #67 PG	Orlando, FL	Windermere Prep	6 ft 1 in (1.85 m)	170 lb (77 kg)	Sep 17, 2014
Michael Stones #67 PG	Recruit ratings: Scout: Rivals: (70)				
Guilien Smith #151 SG	West Roxbury, MA	Catholic Memorial High School	6 ft 1 in (1.85 m)	N/A	Sep 17, 2014
Guilien Smith #151 SG	Recruit ratings: Scout: Rivals: (57)				
Overall recruit ranking:
Note: In many cases, Scout, Rivals, 247Sports, On3, and ESPN may conflict in their listings of height and weight.; In these cases, the average was taken. ESPN grades are on a 100-point scale.; Sources: "2015 Team Ranking". Rivals.

=== Recruiting class of 2016 ===
College recruiting information (2016)
Name	Hometown	School	Height	Weight	Commit date
Ian Carter #65 PF	Gardena, CA	Junipero Serra High School	6 ft 6 in (1.98 m)	175 lb (79 kg)	Jul 1, 2015
Ian Carter #65 PF	Recruit ratings: Scout: Rivals: (69)				
James Foye #98 SG	Hamilton, MA	Phillips Exeter Academy	6 ft 4 in (1.93 m)	185 lb (84 kg)	Aug 12, 2015
James Foye #98 SG	Recruit ratings: Scout: Rivals: (57)				
Overall recruit ranking:
Note: In many cases, Scout, Rivals, 247Sports, On3, and ESPN may conflict in their listings of height and weight.; In these cases, the average was taken. ESPN grades are on a 100-point scale.; Sources: "2016 Team Ranking". Rivals.

== Roster ==
2015–16 Dartmouth Big Green men's basketball team
Players
Coaches

Pos.	#	Name	Height	Weight	Year	Previous school	Hometown
F	0	Tommy Carpenter	6 ft 7 in (2.01 m)	220 lb (100 kg)	Sr	Northfield Mt. Hermon	Greensboro, NC
G	1	Cameron Smith	6 ft 1 in (1.85 m)	175 lb (79 kg)	So	Miller School	Bristow, VA
F	2	Ike Ngwudo	6 ft 6 in (1.98 m)	200 lb (91 kg)	Jr	Milton Academy	Baldwin, NY
F	3	Connor Boehm	6 ft 7 in (2.01 m)	235 lb (107 kg)	Sr	Menomonee Falls	Winnetka, IL
G	4	Taylor Johnson	6 ft 4 in (1.93 m)	180 lb (82 kg)	So	Northwest	Fort Worth, TX
F	5	Matt Rennie	6 ft 8 in (2.03 m)	230 lb (104 kg)	Sr	Rutgers Prep	North Brunswick, NJ
G	10	Malik Gill	5 ft 9 in (1.75 m)	175 lb (79 kg)	Sr	Mount St. Michael Academy	New Rochelle, NY
G	11	Michael Stones	6 ft 2 in (1.88 m)	170 lb (77 kg)	Fr	Windermere Prep	Orlando, FL
F	12	Evan Boudreaux	6 ft 8 in (2.03 m)	220 lb (100 kg)	Fr	Lake Forest	Lake Forest, IL
G	14	Guilien Smith	6 ft 2 in (1.88 m)	180 lb (82 kg)	Fr	Catholic Memorial	West Roxbury, MA
G	15	Kevin Crescemzi	6 ft 3 in (1.91 m)	195 lb (88 kg)	Sr	Benjamin School/Tilton School	North Palm Beach, FL
G	20	Mike Fleming	6 ft 0 in (1.83 m)	175 lb (79 kg)	Jr	Stevenson/Northfield Mt. Hermon	Lake Forest, IL
F	21	Wesley Dickinson	6 ft 7 in (2.01 m)	215 lb (98 kg)	Jr	Dwight-Englewood/Peddie School	Bergenfield, NJ
G	22	Miles Wright	6 ft 4 in (1.93 m)	205 lb (93 kg)	So	Tabor Academy	Boston, MA
G	23	Quinten Payne	6 ft 5 in (1.96 m)	190 lb (86 kg)	Jr	St. Charles North; Ball State	St. Charles, IL
F	25	Brandon McDonnell	6 ft 8 in (2.03 m)	210 lb (95 kg)	Sr	Jackson Memorial	Jackson, NJ
F	33	Eli Harrison	6 ft 6 in (1.98 m)	205 lb (93 kg)	Jr	Sisters	Sisters, OR
C	44	Cole Harrison	6 ft 11 in (2.11 m)	235 lb (107 kg)	Jr	Montrose Christian	Brentwood, TN

Head coach

- Paul Cormier (New Hampshire)

Assistant coach(es)

- Jean Bain (Northeastern)
- James Cormier (Le Moyne)

Legend

- (C) Team captain
- (S) Suspended
- (I) Ineligible
- (W) Walk-on
- Injured
- Current redshirt

Roster

== Schedule ==
Date time, TV	Opponent	Result	Record	Site (attendance) city, state
Regular season
11/13/2015*; 7:00 pm, FSN	at Seton Hall	L 67–84	0–1	Prudential Center (6,114); Newark, NJ
11/17/2015*; 7:00 pm	at Marist	L 63–73	0–2	McCann Field House (1,187); Poughkeepsie, NY
11/29/2015*; 2:00 pm	LIU Brooklyn	W 79–56	1–2	Leede Arena (777); Hanover, NH
12/02/2015*; 7:00 pm	Vermont	L 63–68	1–3	Leede Arena (752); Hanover, NH
12/05/2015*; 2:00 pm	Hartford	W 74–65	2–3	Leede Arena (689); Hanover, NH
12/09/2015*; 7:00 pm	at Maine	W 79–69	3–3	Cross Insurance Center (940); Bangor, ME
12/12/2015*; 10:00 pm, P12N	at Stanford	L 50–64	3–4	Maples Pavilion (4,452); Stanford, CA
12/14/2015*; 10:00 pm	at Cal State Bakersfield	L 62–69	3–5	Icardo Center (975); Bakersfield, CA
12/19/2015*; 1:00 pm	at New Hampshire; Rivalry	L 56–76	3–6	Lundholm Gym (547); Durham, NH
12/22/2015*; 7:00 pm	Longwood	W 78–54	4–6	Leede Arena (512); Hanover, NH
12/31/2015*; 2:00 pm	Bryant	L 60–62	4–7	Leede Arena (873); Hanover, NH
01/04/2016*; 7:00 pm	at Fairfield	L 85–97	4–8	Webster Bank Arena (878); Fairfield, CT
01/09/2016; 2:00 pm	at Harvard	L 70–77	4–9 (0–1)	Lavietes Pavilion (2,195); Cambridge, MA
01/12/2016*; 7:00 pm	Canisius	W 80–69	5–9	Leede Arena (528); Hanover, NH
01/16/2016*; 3:00 pm	Pine Manor	W 121–56	6–9	Leede Arena (551); Hanover, NH
01/23/2016; 7:00 pm	Harvard	W 63–50	7–9 (1–1)	Leede Arena (1,531); Hanover, NH
01/29/2016; 7:00 pm	Columbia	L 60–77	7–10 (1–2)	Leede Arena (835); Hanover, NH
01/30/2016; 7:00 pm	Cornell	L 73–77	7–11 (1–3)	Leede Arena (899); Hanover, NH
02/05/2016; 6:00 pm, ASN	at Penn	L 64–71	7–12 (1–4)	The Palestra (2,889); Philadelphia, PA
02/06/2016; 6:00 pm	at Princeton	L 70–83	7–13 (1–5)	Jadwin Gymnasium (2,553); Princeton, NJ
02/12/2016; 7:00 pm	Yale	L 65–75	7–14 (1–6)	Leede Arena (787); Hanover, NH
02/13/2016; 7:00 pm	Brown	W 87–70	8–14 (2–6)	Leede Arena (777); Hanover, NH
02/19/2016; 7:00 pm	at Cornell	W 78–66	9–14 (3–6)	Newman Arena (1,098); Ithaca, NY
02/20/2016; 7:00 pm	at Columbia	L 54–73	9–15 (3–7)	Levien Gymnasium (2,349); New York City, NY
02/26/2016; 7:00 pm	at Brown	L 83–84 ^{OT}	9–16 (3–8)	Pizzitola Sports Center (808); Providence, RI
02/27/2016; 8:00 pm, ASN	at Yale	L 71–76 ^{OT}	9–17 (3–9)	John J. Lee Amphitheater (2,018); New Haven, CT
03/04/2016; 7:00 pm	Penn	W 72–64	10–17 (4–9)	Leede Arena (922); Hanover, NH
03/05/2016; 7:00 pm	Princeton	L 65–84	10–18 (4–10)	Leede Arena (930); Hanover, NH
*Non-conference game. ^{#}Rankings from AP Poll. (#) Tournament seedings in parentheses. All times are in Eastern Time.
