= 2015–16 Brown Bears men's basketball team =

American college basketball season

2015–16 Brown Bears men's basketball
- Conference: Ivy League
- Record: 8–20 (3–11 Ivy)
- Head coach: Mike Martin (4th season)
- Assistant coaches: Dwayne Pina; T. J. Sorrentine; Tyler Simms
- Home arena: Pizzitola Sports Center

2015–16 Ivy League men's basketball standings
| | Conf. | | | | Overall |
| Team | W | | L | PCT | W | | L | PCT |
|---|---|---|---|---|---|---|---|---|
| x-Yale † | 13 | – | 1 | .929 | 23 | – | 7 | .767 |
| Princeton | 12 | – | 2 | .857 | 22 | – | 7 | .759 |
| Columbia | 10 | – | 4 | .714 | 25 | – | 10 | .714 |
| Harvard | 6 | – | 8 | .429 | 14 | – | 16 | .467 |
| Penn | 5 | – | 9 | .357 | 11 | – | 17 | .393 |
| Dartmouth | 4 | – | 10 | .286 | 10 | – | 18 | .357 |
| Cornell | 3 | – | 11 | .214 | 10 | – | 18 | .357 |
| Brown | 3 | – | 11 | .214 | 8 | – | 20 | .286 |
x – Ivy League champions † – NCAA Tournament participant

The 2015–16 Brown Bears men's basketball team represented Brown University during the 2015–16 NCAA Division I men's basketball season. The Bears, led by fourth year head coach Mike Martin, played their home games at the Pizzitola Sports Center and were members of the Ivy League. They finished the season 8–20, 3–11 in Ivy League play to finish in a tie for seventh place.

== Previous season ==
The Bears finished the season 13–18, 4–10 in Ivy League play to finish in a tie for seventh place.

== Departures ==
| Name | Number | Pos. | Height | Weight | Year | Hometown | Notes |
|---|---|---|---|---|---|---|---|
| Longji Yiljep | 1 | G | 6'5" | 180 | Senior | Sanaru-Zaira, Nigeria | Graduated |
| Leland King | 2 | F | 6'7" | 220 | Sophomore | Inglewood, CA | Transferred to Nevada |
| Joe Sharkey | 11 | G | 6'2" | 190 | Senior | Norwood, MA | Graduated |
| Zeve Sanderson | 32 | G | 6'1" | 180 | Senior | Los Angeles, CA | Graduated |
| Dockery Walker | 42 | F | 6'7" | 220 | Senior | Magnolia, DE | Graduated |
| Rafael Maia | 45 | F | 6'9" | 245 | Junior | São Paulo, Brazil | Graduate transferred to Pittsburgh |
| Jon Schmidt | 50 | F | 6'7" | 215 | Senior | Baltimore, MD | Graduated |

=== Incoming transfers ===
| Name | Number | Pos. | Height | Weight | Year | Hometown | Previous School |
|---|---|---|---|---|---|---|---|
| Blake Wilkinson | 23 | F | 6'7" | 235 | Junior | Centerville, UT | Junior college transferred from Salt Lake Community College |

== Recruiting ==
College recruiting information
| Name | Hometown | School | Height | Weight | Commit date |
|---|---|---|---|---|---|
| Travis Fuller #83 SF | Carlsbad, CA | La Costa Canyon High School | 6 ft 7 in (2.01 m) | 195 lb (88 kg) | Sep 27, 2014 |
| Travis Fuller #83 SF | Recruit ratings: Scout: Rivals: (67) | | | | |
| Corey Daugherty; PG | Barrington, RI | Barrington High School | 6 ft 0 in (1.83 m) | N/A | Dec 18, 2013 |
| Corey Daugherty; PG | Recruit ratings: Scout: Rivals: (NR) | | | | |
| Chris Sullivan; SG | Wilmette, IL | Northfield-Mt. Hermon School | 6 ft 3 in (1.91 m) | 185 lb (84 kg) | May 27, 2014 |
| Chris Sullivan; SG | Recruit ratings: Scout: Rivals: (NR) | | | | |
Overall recruit ranking:
Note: In many cases, Scout, Rivals, 247Sports, On3, and ESPN may conflict in their listings of height and weight.; In these cases, the average was taken. ESPN grades are on a 100-point scale.; Sources: "2015 Team Ranking". Rivals.

=== Recruiting class of 2016 ===
College recruiting information (2016)
| Name | Hometown | School | Height | Weight | Commit date |
|---|---|---|---|---|---|
| David Erebor #66 C | Baltimore, MD | Our Lady of Mt. Carmel High School | 6 ft 9 in (2.06 m) | 215 lb (98 kg) | Sep 23, 2015 |
| David Erebor #66 C | Recruit ratings: Scout: Rivals: (61) | | | | |
Overall recruit ranking:
Note: In many cases, Scout, Rivals, 247Sports, On3, and ESPN may conflict in their listings of height and weight.; In these cases, the average was taken. ESPN grades are on a 100-point scale.; Sources: "2016 Team Ranking". Rivals.

== Roster ==
2015–16 Brown Bears men's basketball team
Players
Coaches

| Pos. | # | Name | Height | Weight | Year | Previous school | Hometown |
|---|---|---|---|---|---|---|---|
| F | 1 | Travis Fuller | 6 ft 9 in (2.06 m) | 215 lb (98 kg) | Fr | La Costa Canyon | Encinitas, CA |
| G | 2 | Justin Massey | 6 ft 3 in (1.91 m) | 190 lb (86 kg) | So | American Heritage | Cooper City, FL |
| G | 3 | Steven Spieth | 6 ft 6 in (1.98 m) | 200 lb (91 kg) | Jr | The Miller School of Albemarle | San Antonio, TX |
| G | 4 | Obi Okolie | 6 ft 5 in (1.96 m) | 195 lb (88 kg) | Fr | Archbishop Denis O'Connor | Ajax, ON |
| G | 5 | Tavon Blackmon | 6 ft 0 in (1.83 m) | 180 lb (82 kg) | Jr | Gonzaga College | Upper Marlboro, MD |
| G | 10 | Chris Sullivan | 6 ft 3 in (1.91 m) | 170 lb (77 kg) | Fr | Northfield Mt. Hermon | Wilmette, IL |
| G | 11 | Joe Sharkey | 6 ft 2 in (1.88 m) | 190 lb (86 kg) | Sr | Northfield Mt. Hermon | Norwood, MA |
| G | 12 | JR Hobbie | 6 ft 4 in (1.93 m) | 190 lb (86 kg) | Jr | Manasquan | Spring Lake, NJ |
| G | 13 | Patrick Triplett | 6 ft 4 in (1.93 m) | 220 lb (100 kg) | So | Bayless | St. Louis, MO |
| G | 15 | Tyler Williams | 6 ft 1 in (1.85 m) | 190 lb (86 kg) | So | Lakota West | West Chester, OH |
| F | 20 | Aram Martin | 6 ft 10 in (2.08 m) | 200 lb (91 kg) | So | The Miller School of Albemarle | San Antonio, TX |
| F | 21 | Cedric Kuakumensah | 6 ft 9 in (2.06 m) | 245 lb (111 kg) | Sr | St. Andrew's School | Worcester, MA |
| G | 22 | Corey Daugherty | 6 ft 1 in (1.85 m) | 165 lb (75 kg) | Fr | Barrington | Barrington, RI |
| F | 23 | Blake Wilkinson | 6 ft 7 in (2.01 m) | 235 lb (107 kg) | Jr | Viewmont; Salt Lake CC | Bountiful, UT |
| F | 24 | Kyle Haber | 6 ft 6 in (1.98 m) | 190 lb (86 kg) | So | Dubuque Senior | Dubuque, IA |
| G | 25 | Jason Massey | 6 ft 4 in (1.93 m) | 205 lb (93 kg) | So | American Heritage | Cooper City, FL |
| F | 30 | Miki Ljuboja | 6 ft 8 in (2.03 m) | 225 lb (102 kg) | So | Phillips Exeter Academy | North Riverside, IL |

Head coach

- Mike Martin (Brown)

Assistant coach(es)

- Dwayne Pina (Boston College)
- T. J. Sorrentine (Vermont)
- Tyler Simms (Trinity (CT))

Legend

- (C) Team captain
- (S) Suspended
- (I) Ineligible
- (W) Walk-on
- Injured
- Current redshirt

Roster

== Schedule ==
| Date time, TV | Opponent | Result | Record | Site (attendance) city, state |
Non-conference regular season
| 11/13/2015*; 8:30 pm | at Saint Peter's | L 65–77 | 0–1 | Yanitelli Center (720); Jersey City, NJ |
| 11/16/2015*; 7:00 pm | Holy Cross | W 71–55 | 1–1 | Pizzitola Sports Center (1,224); Providence, RI |
| 11/18/2015*; 7:00 pm | at Niagara | L 66–75 | 1–2 | Gallagher Center (1,335); Lewiston, NY |
| 11/21/2015*; 7:00 pm, FSN | at Providence; Ocean State Cup | L 73–94 | 1–3 | Dunkin' Donuts Center (8,706); Providence, RI |
| 11/24/2015*; 7:00 pm | New Hampshire | L 77–88 | 1–4 | Pizzitola Sports Center (556); Providence, RI |
| 11/29/2015*; 3:00 pm, ESPN3 | at No. 25 SMU | L 69–77 | 1–5 | Moody Coliseum (6,852); Dallas, TX |
| 12/02/2015*; 7:00 pm | Central Connecticut | W 82–64 | 2–5 | Pizzitola Sports Center (625); Providence, RI |
| 12/05/2015*; 4:00 pm | at Bryant; Ocean State Cup | W 76–68 | 3–5 | Chace Athletic Center (536); Smithfield, RI |
| 12/07/2015*; 7:00 pm, FS2 | at Georgetown | L 57–74 | 3–6 | Verizon Center (4,690); Washington, D.C. |
| 12/22/2015*; 6:30 pm | vs. Marist; Hall of Fame Shootout | L 83–84 ^{2OT} | 3–7 | Mohegan Sun Arena; Uncasville, CT |
| 12/28/2015*; 7:00 pm | Bethune-Cookman | W 81–73 | 4–7 | Pizzitola Sports Center (774); Providence, RI |
| 12/30/2015*; 7:00 pm | Rhode Island; Ocean State Cup | L 85–88 ^{OT} | 4–8 | Pizzitola Sports Center (2,516); Providence, RI |
| 01/02/2016*; 2:00 pm | at Maine | L 92–98 | 4–9 | Cross Insurance Center (1,228); Bangor, ME |
| 01/09/2016*; 2:00 pm | Daniel Webster | W 69–43 | 5–9 | Pizzitola Sports Center (601); Providence, RI |
Ivy League regular season
| 01/16/2016; 5:00 pm | at Yale | L 68–77 | 5–10 (0–1) | John J. Lee Amphitheater (1,878); New Haven, CT |
| 01/23/2016; 5:00 pm, ESPN3 | Yale | L 66-90 | 5–11 (0–2) | Pizzitola Sports Center (1,302); Providence, RI |
| 01/29/2016; 6:00 pm, ASN | Princeton | L 59–83 | 5–12 (0–3) | Pizzitola Sports Center (1,948); Providence, RI |
| 01/30/2016; 8:00 pm, ASN | Penn | W 89–83 | 6–12 (1–3) | Pizzitola Sports Center (2,165); Providence, RI |
| 02/05/2016; 7:00 pm | Cornell | W 86–80 | 7–12 (2–3) | Pizzitola Sports Center (738); Providence, RI |
| 02/06/2016; 6:00 pm | Columbia | L 73–77 | 7–13 (2–4) | Pizzitola Sports Center (953); Providence, RI |
| 02/12/2016; 7:00 pm | at Harvard | L 73–79 | 7–14 (2–5) | Lavietes Pavilion (1,712); Cambridge, MA |
| 02/13/2016; 7:00 pm | at Dartmouth | L 70–87 | 7–15 (2–6) | Leede Arena (777); Hanover, NH |
| 02/19/2016; 7:00 pm | at Penn | L 74–79 | 7–16 (2–7) | The Palestra (3,335); Philadelphia, PA |
| 02/20/2016; 6:00 pm | at Princeton | L 66–77 | 7–17 (2–8) | Jadwin Gymnasium (2,772); Princeton, NJ |
| 02/26/2016; 7:00 pm | Dartmouth | W 84–83 ^{OT} | 8–17 (3–8) | Pizzitola Sports Center (808); Providence, RI |
| 02/27/2016; 6:00 pm | Harvard | L 52–61 | 8–18 (3–9) | Pizzitola Sports Center; Providence, RI |
| 03/04/2016; 7:00 pm | at Columbia | L 63–66 | 8–19 (3–10) | Levien Gymnasium (1,937); New York City, NY |
| 03/05/2016; 6:00 pm | at Cornell | L 71–75 | 8–20 (3–11) | Newman Arena (1,629); Ithaca, NY |
*Non-conference game. ^{#}Rankings from AP Poll. (#) Tournament seedings in parentheses. All times are in Eastern Time.
