= 2015–16 Harvard Crimson men's basketball team =

American college basketball season

2015–16 Harvard Crimson men's basketball
- Conference: Ivy League
- Record: 14–16 (6–8 Ivy)
- Head coach: Tommy Amaker (9th season)
- Assistant coaches: Brian DeStefano; Brian Eskildsen; Christian Webster
- Home arena: Lavietes Pavilion

2015–16 Ivy League men's basketball standings
	Conf.				Overall
Team	W		L	PCT	W		L	PCT
x-Yale †	13	–	1	.929	23	–	7	.767
Princeton	12	–	2	.857	22	–	7	.759
Columbia	10	–	4	.714	25	–	10	.714
Harvard	6	–	8	.429	14	–	16	.467
Penn	5	–	9	.357	11	–	17	.393
Dartmouth	4	–	10	.286	10	–	18	.357
Cornell	3	–	11	.214	10	–	18	.357
Brown	3	–	11	.214	8	–	20	.286
x – Ivy League champions † – NCAA Tournament participant

The 2015–16 Harvard Crimson men's basketball team represented Harvard University during the 2015–16 NCAA Division I men's basketball season. The Crimson, led by ninth year head coach Tommy Amaker, played their home games at Lavietes Pavilion and were members of the Ivy League. They finished the season 14–16, 6–8 in Ivy League play to finish in fourth place.

== Previous season ==
The Crimson finished the season 22–8, 11–3 in Ivy League play to share to the regular season Ivy League title with Yale. They earned the Ivy League's automatic bid to the NCAA Tournament after defeating Yale in a One-game playoff, the ninth one-game playoff tie breaker in Ivy League history. In the NCAA Tournament, the Crimson lost to North Carolina in the second round.

== Departures ==
Name	Number	Pos.	Height	Weight	Year	Hometown	Notes
Siyani Chambers	1	G	6'0"	170	Junior	Golden Valley, MN	Left the team for personal reasons
Alex Nesbitt	2	G	6'1"	175	Senior	Chicago, IL	Graduated
Matt Brown	3	G	6'3"	205	Senior	Barrington, RI	Graduated
Steve Moundou-Missi	14	F	6'7"	225	Senior	Yaoundé, Cameroon	Graduated
Wesley Saunders	23	G/F	6'5"	215	Senior	Los Angeles, CA	Graduated
Jonah Travis	24	F	6'6"	225	Senior	Minneapolis, MN	Graduated
Kenyatta Smith	25	C	6'8"	245	Senior	Sun Valley, CA	Graduated
Charlie Anastasi	32	F	6'6"	225	Senior	Washington Crossing, PA	Graduated

== Recruiting class of 2015 ==
College recruiting information
Name	Hometown	School	Height	Weight	Commit date
Tommy McCarthy #67 PG	Carlsbad, CA	La Costa Canyon High School	6 ft 0 in (1.83 m)	155 lb (70 kg)	Oct 2, 2014
Tommy McCarthy #67 PG	Recruit ratings: Scout: Rivals: (69)				
Balsa Dragovic #66 PF	Montebello, CA	Cantwell Sacred Heart Of Mary High School	6 ft 7 in (2.01 m)	190 lb (86 kg)	Oct 2, 2014
Balsa Dragovic #66 PF	Recruit ratings: Scout: Rivals: (66)				
Weisner Perez; SF	Berwyn, IL	Morton West High School	6 ft 6 in (1.98 m)	205 lb (93 kg)	Sep 26, 2014
Weisner Perez; SF	Recruit ratings: Scout: Rivals: (NR)				
Corey Johnson; SG	Ottawa, ON	Vermont Academy	6 ft 5 in (1.96 m)	185 lb (84 kg)	Nov 11, 2014
Corey Johnson; SG	Recruit ratings: Scout: Rivals: (NR)				
Overall recruit ranking:
Note: In many cases, Scout, Rivals, 247Sports, On3, and ESPN may conflict in their listings of height and weight.; In these cases, the average was taken. ESPN grades are on a 100-point scale.; Sources: "Harvard 2015 Basketball Commitments". Rivals.; "2015 Harvard Basketball Commits". Scout.; "ESPN Recruiting Nation Basketball". ESPN.; "Scout.com Team Recruiting Rankings". Scout.; "2015 Team Ranking". Rivals.

=== Class of 2016 ===
College recruiting information (2016)
Name	Hometown	School	Height	Weight	Commit date
Chris Lewis #15 PF	Alpharetta, GA	Milton High School	6 ft 8 in (2.03 m)	235 lb (107 kg)	Jan 18, 2015
Chris Lewis #15 PF	Recruit ratings: Scout: Rivals: (85)				
Robert Baker Jr. #15 PF	Woodstock, GA	The Walker School	6 ft 9 in (2.06 m)	190 lb (86 kg)	Aug 13, 2015
Robert Baker Jr. #15 PF	Recruit ratings: Scout: Rivals: (80)				
Seth Towns #22 SF	Columbus, OH	Northland High School	6 ft 7 in (2.01 m)	200 lb (91 kg)	Jun 15, 2015
Seth Towns #22 SF	Recruit ratings: Scout: Rivals: (79)				
Justin Bassey #26 SF	Aurora, CO	Colorado Academy	6 ft 5 in (1.96 m)	210 lb (95 kg)	Mar 25, 2015
Justin Bassey #26 SF	Recruit ratings: Scout: Rivals: (79)				
Christian Juzang #68 PG	Calabasas, CA	Viewpoint High School	6 ft 2 in (1.88 m)	175 lb (79 kg)	Apr 30, 2015
Christian Juzang #68 PG	Recruit ratings: Scout: Rivals: (66)				
Overall recruit ranking:
Note: In many cases, Scout, Rivals, 247Sports, On3, and ESPN may conflict in their listings of height and weight.; In these cases, the average was taken. ESPN grades are on a 100-point scale.; Sources: "Harvard 2016 Basketball Commitments". Rivals.; "2016 Harvard Basketball Commits". Scout.; "ESPN Recruiting Nation Basketball". ESPN.; "Scout.com Team Recruiting Rankings". Scout.; "2016 Team Ranking". Rivals.

== Roster ==
2015–16 Harvard Crimson men's basketball team
Players
Coaches

Pos.	#	Name	Height	Weight	Year	Hometown
G	0	Robbie Feinberg	6 ft 4 in (1.93 m)	200 lb (91 kg)	Fr	Hidden Hills, California
G	2	James McLean	6 ft 1 in (1.85 m)	185 lb (84 kg)	Fr	Atherton, California
G	3	Tommy McCarthy	6 ft 1 in (1.85 m)	175 lb (79 kg)	Fr	Rancho Santa Fe, California
F/C	4	Zena Edosomwan	6 ft 9 in (2.06 m)	245 lb (111 kg)	Jr	Los Angeles, California
F	5	Hunter Myers	6 ft 7 in (2.01 m)	225 lb (102 kg)	So	Minden, Nevada
G/F	10	Patrick Steeves	6 ft 7 in (2.01 m)	220 lb (100 kg)	Sr	Montreal, Quebec
F	11	Chris Egi	6 ft 9 in (2.06 m)	215 lb (98 kg)	So	Markham, Ontario
G	12	Matt Fraschilla	6 ft 0 in (1.83 m)	165 lb (75 kg)	Jr	Dallas, Texas
G	13	Andre Chatfield	6 ft 4 in (1.93 m)	185 lb (84 kg)	So	Lilburn, Georgia
F	14	Balsa Dragovic	6 ft 10 in (2.08 m)	220 lb (100 kg)	Fr	Zemun, Serbia
G	15	Corbin Miller	6 ft 2 in (1.88 m)	180 lb (82 kg)	Jr	Sandy, Utah
G	21	Zach Yoshor	6 ft 6 in (1.98 m)	205 lb (93 kg)	So	Houston, Texas
F	23	Weisner Perez	6 ft 6 in (1.98 m)	210 lb (95 kg)	Fr	Berwyn, Illinois
G	25	Corey Johnson	6 ft 5 in (1.96 m)	200 lb (91 kg)	Fr	Ottawa, Ontario
F	33	Evan Cummins (C)	6 ft 8 in (2.03 m)	215 lb (98 kg)	Sr	Westborough, Massachusetts
G/F	35	Agunwa Okolie	6 ft 8 in (2.03 m)	205 lb (93 kg)	Sr	Ajax, Ontario

Head coach

- Tommy Amaker (Duke)

Assistant coach(es)

- Brian DeStefano (Duke)
- Brian Eskildsen (Tennessee)
- Christian Webster (Harvard)

Legend

- (C) Team captain
- (S) Suspended
- (I) Ineligible
- (W) Walk-on
- Injured
- Current redshirt

Roster

== Schedule ==
Date time, TV	Opponent	Result	Record	Site (attendance) city, state
Exhibition
11/07/2015*; 3:30 pm	McGill	W 66–63		Lavietes Pavilion; Cambridge, MA
Regular season
11/13/2015*; 7:45 pm	MIT	W 59–39	1–0	Lavietes Pavilion (2,195); Cambridge, MA
11/14/2015*; 7:00 pm, FSN	at Providence	L 64–76	1–1	Dunkin' Donuts Center (9,477); Providence, RI
11/17/2015*; 7:00 pm, NESN	Massachusetts	L 63–69	1–2	Lavietes Pavilion (2,195); Cambridge, MA
11/22/2015*; 12:30 pm, ESPNU	at Boston College; Rivalry	L 56–69	1–3	Conte Forum (2,765); Chestnut Hill, MA
11/25/2015*; 7:00 pm, ESPN3	Bryant	W 80–45	2–3	Lavietes Pavilion (1,314); Cambridge, MA
11/29/2015*; 1:00 pm	at Holy Cross	L 49–50	2–4	Hart Center (1,796); Worcester, MA
12/02/2015*; 7:00 pm	at Northeastern	L 71–80	2–5	Matthews Arena (2,383); Boston, MA
12/05/2015*; 3:15 pm, ESPN2	at No. 4 Kansas	L 69–75	2–6	Allen Fieldhouse (16,300); Lawrence, KS
12/08/2015*; 7:00 pm	at Boston University	W 75–69	3–6	Case Gym (832); Boston, MA
12/22/2015*; 5:00 pm, ESPNU	vs. BYU; Diamond Head Classic quarterfinals	W 85–82 ^{OT}	4–6	Stan Sheriff Center (7,161); Honolulu, HI
12/23/2015*; 5:00 pm, ESPNU	vs. Auburn; Diamond Head Classic semifinals	W 69–51	5–6	Stan Sheriff Center (6,437); Honolulu, HI
12/25/2015*; 8:30 pm, ESPN2	vs. No. 3 Oklahoma; Diamond Head Classic Championship	L 71–83	5–7	Stan Sheriff Center (7,251); Honolulu, HI
12/31/2015*; 2:30 pm, NESN	Wofford	W 77–57	6–7	Lavietes Pavilion (1,503); Cambridge, MA
01/06/2016*; 2:00 pm, ESPN3	Vermont	L 62–65	6–8	Lavietes Pavilion (1,526); Cambridge, MA
01/09/2016; 2:00 pm, NESN	Dartmouth	W 77–70	7–8 (1–0)	Lavietes Pavilion (2,195); Cambridge, MA
01/12/2016*; 7:00 pm	Ryerson	W 73–57	8–8	Lavietes Pavilion (853); Cambridge, MA
01/16/2016*; 12:00 pm	at Howard	W 69–61	9–8	Burr Gymnasium (2,700); Washington, D.C.
01/23/2016; 7:00 pm	at Dartmouth	L 50–63	9–9 (1–1)	Leede Arena (1,531); Hanover, NH
01/29/2016; 7:00 pm	Cornell	L 65–77	9–10 (1–2)	Lavietes Pavilion (1,712); Cambridge, MA
01/30/2016; 7:00 pm	Columbia	L 54–55	9–11 (1–3)	Lavietes Pavilion (2,195); Cambridge, MA
02/05/2016; 6:00 pm, ESPNU	at Princeton	L 62–83	9–12 (1–4)	Jadwin Gymnasium (3,549); Princeton, NJ
02/06/2016; 7:00 pm, ESPN3	at Penn	L 57–67	9–13 (1–5)	The Palestra (4,018); Philadelphia, PA
02/12/2016; 7:00 pm	Brown	W 79–73	10–13 (2–5)	Lavietes Pavilion (1,712); Cambridge, MA
02/13/2016; 7:00 pm, NESN	Yale	L 55–67	10–14 (2–6)	Lavietes Pavilion (2,195); Cambridge, MA
02/19/2016; 6:00 pm, ASN	at Columbia	L 76–90	10–15 (2–7)	Levien Gymnasium (2,587); New York City, NY
02/20/2016; 6:00 pm, ESPN3	at Cornell	W 76–74	11–15 (3–7)	Newman Arena (1,938); Ithaca, NY
02/26/2016; 7:00 pm, FS1	at Yale	L 50–59	11–16 (3–8)	John J. Lee Amphitheater (2,532); New Haven, CT
02/27/2016; 6:00 pm	at Brown	W 61–52	12–16 (4–8)	Pizzitola Sports Center; Providence, RI
03/04/2016; 7:00 pm, ESPN3	Princeton	W 73–71	13–16 (5–8)	Lavietes Pavilion (2,195); Cambridge, MA
03/05/2016; 7:00 pm	Penn	W 74–56	14–16 (6–8)	Lavietes Pavilion (2,195); Cambridge, MA
*Non-conference game. ^{#}Rankings from AP Poll,. (#) Tournament seedings in parentheses. All times are in Eastern Time.
