= 2015–16 Princeton Tigers men's basketball team =

American college basketball season

2015–16 Princeton Tigers men's basketball

NIT, First Round
- Conference: Ivy League
- Record: 22–7 (12–2 Ivy)
- Head coach: Mitch Henderson (5th season)
- Assistant coaches: Brian Earl; Brett MacConnell; Donovan Williams
- Captains: Mike Washington Jr.; Spencer Weisz; Steven Cook
- Home arena: Jadwin Gymnasium

2015–16 Ivy League men's basketball standings
	Conf.				Overall
Team	W		L	PCT	W		L	PCT
x-Yale †	13	–	1	.929	23	–	7	.767
Princeton	12	–	2	.857	22	–	7	.759
Columbia	10	–	4	.714	25	–	10	.714
Harvard	6	–	8	.429	14	–	16	.467
Penn	5	–	9	.357	11	–	17	.393
Dartmouth	4	–	10	.286	10	–	18	.357
Cornell	3	–	11	.214	10	–	18	.357
Brown	3	–	11	.214	8	–	20	.286
x – Ivy League champions † – NCAA Tournament participant

The 2015–16 Princeton Tigers men's basketball team represented Princeton University during the 2015–16 NCAA Division I men's basketball season. The Tigers, led by fifth year head coach Mitch Henderson, played their home games at Jadwin Gymnasium and were members of the Ivy League. They finished the season 22–7, 12–2 in Ivy League play to finish in second place. They were invited to the National Invitation Tournament where they lost in the first round to Virginia Tech.

== Previous season ==
The Tigers finished the season 16–14, 9–5 in Ivy League play to finish in third place.

== Awards and accomplishments ==
Spencer Weisz earned second-team All-Ivy League recognition in 2016. As a junior, he served as a tri-captain (along with Mike Washington, Jr. and Steven Cook) of the 2015–16 team, led the Ivy League in assist-to-turnover ratio (2.8), and was 2nd in the league in assists-per-game (3.9), 4th in assists (113), 6th in 3-point field goals (63), and 8th in defensive rebounds (129).

== Departures ==
Name	Number	Pos.	Height	Weight	Year	Hometown	Notes
Clay Wilson	3	G	6'3"	170	Senior	Tulsa, OK	Graduated
Denton Koon	4	F	6'8"	210	RS Junior	Liberty, MO	Graduate transferred to Hofstra
Ben Hazel	12	G/F	6'5"	191	Senior	Bowie, MD	Graduated
Daniel Edwards	32	F	6'8"	225	Senior	Dallas, TX	Graduated
Bobby Garbade	40	C	6'11"	234	Senior	Binghamton, NY	Graduated

== Recruiting ==
College recruiting
Name	Hometown	School	Height	Weight	Commit date
Myles Stephens #92 SF	Middletown, DE	Saint Andrew's School	6 ft 3 in (1.91 m)	185 lb (84 kg)	Mar 21, 2014
Myles Stephens #92 SF	Recruit ratings: Scout: Rivals: (65)				
Noah Bramlage; PF	Ottawa, OH	Ottawa-Glandorf High School	6 ft 7 in (2.01 m)	215 lb (98 kg)	Sep 13, 2014
Noah Bramlage; PF	Recruit ratings: Scout: Rivals: (NR)				
Devin Cannady; PG	Mishawaka, IN	Marian High School	6 ft 0 in (1.83 m)	170 lb (77 kg)	Aug 20, 2014
Devin Cannady; PG	Recruit ratings: Scout: Rivals: (NR)				
Overall recruit ranking:
Note: In many cases, Scout, Rivals, 247Sports, On3, and ESPN may conflict in their listings of height and weight.; In these cases, the average was taken. ESPN grades are on a 100-point scale.; Sources: "2015 Team Ranking". Rivals.

=== Recruiting class of 2016 ===
College recruiting (2016)
Name	Hometown	School	Height	Weight	Commit date
Jose Morales; PG	Fort Lauderdale, FL	Cardinal Gibbons High School	5 ft 9 in (1.75 m)	160 lb (73 kg)	Sep 22, 2014
Jose Morales; PG	Recruit ratings: Scout: Rivals: (NR)				
Overall recruit ranking:
Note: In many cases, Scout, Rivals, 247Sports, On3, and ESPN may conflict in their listings of height and weight.; In these cases, the average was taken. ESPN grades are on a 100-point scale.; Sources: "2016 Team Ranking". Rivals.

== Roster ==
2015–16 Princeton Tigers men's basketball team
Players
Coaches

Pos.	#	Name	Height	Weight	Year	Previous school	Hometown
G	0	Aaron Young	6 ft 0 in (1.83 m)	180 lb (82 kg)	So	Virginia Episcopal School	Falls Church, VA
G	3	Devin Cannady	6 ft 1 in (1.85 m)	180 lb (82 kg)	Fr	Marian	Mishawaka, IN
G	5	Amir Bell	6 ft 3 in (1.91 m)	160 lb (73 kg)	So	East Brunswick	East Brunswick, NJ
F	10	Spencer Weisz (C)	6 ft 4 in (1.93 m)	180 lb (82 kg)	Jr	Seton Hall Prep	Florham Park, NJ
G	11	Elias Berbari	6 ft 2 in (1.88 m)	170 lb (77 kg)	Fr	Harborfields	Greenlawn, NY
G	12	Myles Stephens	6 ft 4 in (1.93 m)	190 lb (86 kg)	Fr	St. Andrew's	Lawrenceville, NJ
G	13	Mike Washington, Jr. (C)	6 ft 3 in (1.91 m)	190 lb (86 kg)	Sr	Oak Harbor	Oak Harbor, WA
G	14	Khyan Rayner	5 ft 11 in (1.8 m)	165 lb (75 kg)	Jr	Jesuit	Portland, OR
F	20	Jackson Forbes	6 ft 6 in (1.98 m)	215 lb (98 kg)	So	John Paul II	Plano, TX
F	21	Henry Caruso	6 ft 4 in (1.93 m)	190 lb (86 kg)	So	Junípero Serra	San Mateo, CA
F	23	Mike LeBlanc	6 ft 6 in (1.98 m)	195 lb (88 kg)	So	New Hampton	Dover, DE
F	25	Steven Cook (C)	6 ft 5 in (1.96 m)	185 lb (84 kg)	Jr	Wauwatosa West	Winnetka, IL
F	30	Hans Brase (injured)	6 ft 8 in (2.03 m)	231 lb (105 kg)	Sr	Hill School	Clover, SC
F	31	Pete Miller	6 ft 10 in (2.08 m)	225 lb (102 kg)	Jr	Northfield Mount Hermon	Winchester, MA
F	35	Alec Brennan	6 ft 11 in (2.11 m)	235 lb (107 kg)	So	Milton Academy	Weston, MA
F	44	Noah Bramlage	6 ft 7 in (2.01 m)	240 lb (109 kg)	Fr	Ottawa-Glandorf	Glandorf, OH

Head coach

- Mitch Henderson (Princeton)

Assistant coach(es)

- Brian Earl (Princeton)
- Brett MacConnell (Rutgers)
- Donovan Williams (Park)

Legend

- (C) Team captain
- (S) Suspended
- (I) Ineligible
- (W) Walk-on
- Injured
- Current redshirt

Roster

== Schedule ==
Date time, TV	Rank^{#}	Opponent^{#}	Result	Record	Site (attendance) city, state
Regular Season
11/13/2015*; 7:00 pm		at Rider	W 64–56	1–0	Alumni Gymnasium (1,650); Lawrenceville, NJ
11/21/2015*; 9:00 pm		Saint Peter's	W 75–72	2–0	Dillon Gymnasium (1,306); Princeton, NJ
11/25/2015*; 7:00 pm		Lafayette	W 104–52	3–0	Jadwin Gymnasium (1,578); Princeton, NJ
11/30/2015*; 7:00 pm		Fairleigh Dickinson	W 91–61	4–0	Jadwin Gymnasium (1,232); Princeton, NJ
12/05/2015*; 2:00 pm		at Stony Brook	L 77–91	4–1	Island Federal Credit Union Arena (3,187); Stony Brook, NY
12/08/2015*; 7:00 pm		at Saint Joseph's	L 50–62	4–2	Hagan Arena (3,451); Philadelphia, PA
12/12/2015*; 4:00 pm, ESPN3		at Lipscomb	W 78–64	5–2	Allen Arena (1,445); Nashville, TN
12/17/2015*; 7:00 pm		Liberty	W 77–72	6–2	Jadwin Gymnasium (1,360); Princeton, NJ
12/19/2015*; 7:00 pm, BTN		vs. No. 6 Maryland; Baltimore Showcase	L 61–82	6–3	Royal Farms Arena (11,076); Baltimore, MD
12/22/2015*; 7:00 pm		Bucknell	W 89–77	7–3	Jadwin Gymnasium (2.049); Princeton, NJ
12/29/2015*; 7:00 pm		at No. 13 Miami (FL)	L 64–76	7–4	BankUnited Center (6,927); Coral Gables, FL
01/03/2016*; 5:00 pm		at Hampton	W 89–59	8–4	Hampton Convocation Center (2,115); Hampton, VA
01/05/2016*; 7:00 pm		at Norfolk State	W 83–74	9–4	Joseph G. Echols Memorial Hall (1,011); Norfolk, VA
01/09/2016; 4:30 pm, FS1		at Penn; Rivalry	W 73–71 ^{OT}	10–4 (1–0)	The Palestra (5,029); Philadelphia, PA
01/24/2016*; 2:00 pm		Bryn Athyn	W 100–44	11–4	Jadwin Gymnasium (1,072); Princeton, NJ
01/29/2016; 6:00 pm, ASN		at Brown	W 83–59	12–4 (2–0)	Pizzitola Sports Center (1,948); Providence, RI
01/30/2016; 7:00 pm		at Yale	L 75–79	12–5 (2–1)	John J. Lee Amphitheater (2,187); New Haven, CT
02/05/2016; 6:00 pm, ESPNU		Harvard	W 83–62	13–5 (3–1)	Jadwin Gymnasium (3,549); Princeton, NJ
02/06/2016; 6:00 pm		Dartmouth	W 83–70	14–5 (4–1)	Jadwin Gymnasium (2,553); Princeton, NJ
02/12/2016; 6:00 pm, ASN		at Cornell	W 85–56	15–5 (5–1)	Newman Arena (1,344); Ithaca, NY
02/13/2016; 7:00 pm		at Columbia	W 88–83 ^{OT}	16–5 (6–1)	Levien Gymnasium (2,633); New York City, NY
02/19/2016; 7:00 pm		Yale	W 75–63	17–5 (7–1)	Jadwin Gymnasium (4,211); Princeton, NJ
02/20/2016; 6:00 pm		Brown	W 77–66	18–5 (8–1)	Jadwin Gymnasium (2,772); Princeton, NJ
02/26/2016; 6:00 pm, ASN		Columbia	W 88–83	19–5 (9–1)	Jadwin Gymnasium (3,121); Princeton, NJ
02/27/2016; 6:00 pm		Cornell	W 74–60	20–5 (10–1)	Jadwin Gymnasium (2,992); Princeton, NJ
03/04/2016; 7:00 pm		at Harvard	L 71–73	20–6 (10–2)	Lavietes Pavilion (2,195); Cambridge, MA
03/05/2016; 7:00 pm		at Dartmouth	W 84–65	21–6 (11–2)	Leede Arena (930); Hanover, NH
03/08/2016; 8:00 pm		Penn; Rivalry	W 72–71	22–6 (12–2)	Jadwin Gymnasium; Princeton, NJ
National Invitation Tournament
03/16/2016*; 8:00 pm, ESPNU	(6)	at (3) Virginia Tech; First round – St. Bonaventure Bracket	L 81–86 ^{OT}	22–7	Cassell Coliseum (8,241); Blacksburg, VA
*Non-conference game. ^{#}Rankings from AP Poll. (#) Tournament seedings in parentheses. All times are in Eastern Time.

== See also ==
- 2015–16 Princeton Tigers women's basketball team
