= 2015–16 Penn Quakers men's basketball team =

American college basketball season

2015–16 Penn Quakers men's basketball
- Conference: Ivy League
- Record: 11–17 (5–9 Ivy)
- Head coach: Steve Donahue (1st season)
- Assistant coaches: Nat Graham; Ira Bowman; Joe Mihalich, Jr.
- Home arena: The Palestra

2015–16 Ivy League men's basketball standings
	Conf.				Overall
Team	W		L	PCT	W		L	PCT
x-Yale †	13	–	1	.929	23	–	7	.767
Princeton	12	–	2	.857	22	–	7	.759
Columbia	10	–	4	.714	25	–	10	.714
Harvard	6	–	8	.429	14	–	16	.467
Penn	5	–	9	.357	11	–	17	.393
Dartmouth	4	–	10	.286	10	–	18	.357
Cornell	3	–	11	.214	10	–	18	.357
Brown	3	–	11	.214	8	–	20	.286
x – Ivy League champions † – NCAA Tournament participant

The 2015–16 Penn Quakers men's basketball team represented the University of Pennsylvania during the 2015–16 NCAA Division I men's basketball season. The Quakers, led by first year head coach Steve Donahue, played their home games at The Palestra and were members of the Ivy League. They finished the season 11–17, 5–9 in Ivy League play to finish in fifth place.

== Previous season ==
The Quakers finished the season 9–19, 4–10 in Ivy League play to finish in a tie for seventh place.

== Departures ==
Name	Number	Pos.	Height	Weight	Year	Hometown	Notes
Camyrn Crocker	15	G	6'3"	170	Senior	Cypress, CA	Graduated
Greg Louis	23	F	6'7"	215	Senior	West Palm, Beach, FL	Graduated
Patrick Lucas-Perry	30	G	5'11"	165	Senior	Grand Blanc, MI	Graduated
Preston Troutt	32	G	5'11"	165	Sophomore	Dallas, TX	Left the team for personal reasons

=== Incoming transfers ===
Name	Number	Pos.	Height	Weight	Year	Hometown	Previous School
Matt MacDonald		G	6'5"	200	Junior	Buffalo, NY	Transferred from Fairleigh Dickinson. Under NCAA transfer rules, MacDonald will have to sit out for the 2015–16 season. Will have two years of remaining eligibility.

== Recruiting ==
College recruiting
Name	Hometown	School	Height	Weight	Commit date
Jake Silpe #67 PG	Cherry Hill, NJ	Cherry Hill High School East	6 ft 2 in (1.88 m)	170 lb (77 kg)	Jul 30, 2014
Jake Silpe #67 PG	Recruit ratings: Scout: Rivals: (70)				
Jackson Donahue #99 SG	Pawcatuck, CT	Northfield-Mt. Hermon School	6 ft 1 in (1.85 m)	N/A	May 15, 2014
Jackson Donahue #99 SG	Recruit ratings: Scout: Rivals: (65)				
Jule Brown #108 SF	Ardmore, PA	Lower Marion High School	6 ft 6 in (1.98 m)	N/A	May 8, 2014
Jule Brown #108 SF	Recruit ratings: Scout: Rivals: (60)				
Collin McManus #74 C	Bedford, NH	Northfield-Mt. Hermon School	6 ft 10 in (2.08 m)	230 lb (100 kg)	May 8, 2014
Collin McManus #74 C	Recruit ratings: Scout: Rivals: (59)				
Morris Esformes; PG	Miami Beach, FL	Hebrew Academy	5 ft 10 in (1.78 m)	N/A	Mar 3, 2014
Morris Esformes; PG	Recruit ratings: Scout: Rivals: (NR)				
Tyler Hamilton; SG	Norcross, GA	Cheshire Academy	6 ft 3 in (1.91 m)	180 lb (82 kg)	Dec 15, 2014
Tyler Hamilton; SG	Recruit ratings: Scout: Rivals: (NR)				
Overall recruit ranking:
Note: In many cases, Scout, Rivals, 247Sports, On3, and ESPN may conflict in their listings of height and weight.; In these cases, the average was taken. ESPN grades are on a 100-point scale.; Sources: "2015 Team Ranking". Rivals.

=== Recruiting class of 2016 ===
College recruiting (2016)
Name	Hometown	School	Height	Weight	Commit date
A. J. Brodeur #47 PF	Northborough, MA	Northfield-Mt. Hermon School	6 ft 8 in (2.03 m)	215 lb (98 kg)	
A. J. Brodeur #47 PF	Recruit ratings: Scout: Rivals: (76)				
Ryan Betley #78 SG	Downingtown, PA	Downingtown West High School	6 ft 4 in (1.93 m)	170 lb (77 kg)	
Ryan Betley #78 SG	Recruit ratings: Scout: Rivals: (62)				
Overall recruit ranking:
Note: In many cases, Scout, Rivals, 247Sports, On3, and ESPN may conflict in their listings of height and weight.; In these cases, the average was taken. ESPN grades are on a 100-point scale.; Sources: "2016 Team Ranking". Rivals.

=== Recruiting class of 2017 ===
College recruiting (2017)
Name	Hometown	School	Height	Weight	Commit date
Jordan Salzman; PG	Locust Valley, NY	Locust Valley High School	5 ft 10 in (1.78 m)	150 lb (68 kg)	Mar 2, 2015
Jordan Salzman; PG	Recruit ratings: Scout: Rivals: (NR)				
Overall recruit ranking:
Note: In many cases, Scout, Rivals, 247Sports, On3, and ESPN may conflict in their listings of height and weight.; In these cases, the average was taken. ESPN grades are on a 100-point scale.; Sources: "2017 Team Ranking". Rivals.

== Roster ==
2015–16 Penn Quakers men's basketball team
Players
Coaches

Pos.	#	Name	Height	Weight	Year	Previous school	Hometown
F	0	Max Rothschild	6 ft 8 in (2.03 m)	225 lb (102 kg)	Fr	New Hampton	Chicago, IL
G	1	Jake Silpe	6 ft 2 in (1.88 m)	185 lb (84 kg)	Fr	Cherry Hill East	Cherry Hill, NJ
G	2	Antonio Woods	6 ft 1 in (1.85 m)	180 lb (82 kg)	So	Summit Country Day	Cincinnati, OH
G	3	Darnell Foreman	6 ft 1 in (1.85 m)	175 lb (79 kg)	So	Pitman	Camden, NJ
G	4	Jamal Lewis	6 ft 0 in (1.83 m)	160 lb (73 kg)	Sr	Sidwell Friends	Springdale, MD
G	5	Jackson Donahue	6 ft 0 in (1.83 m)	175 lb (79 kg)	Fr	Northfield Mount Hermon	Pawcatuck, CT
C	10	Darien Nelson-Henry	6 ft 10 in (2.08 m)	265 lb (120 kg)	Sr	Lake Washington	Kirkland, WA
F	13	Dylan Jones	6 ft 8 in (2.03 m)	215 lb (98 kg)	Jr	The Village School	Houston, TX
F	14	Sam Jones	6 ft 7 in (2.01 m)	175 lb (79 kg)	Jr	Gilbert Christian	Gilbert, AZ
G	21	Matt Poplawski	5 ft 10 in (1.78 m)	165 lb (75 kg)	Jr	Lakeside School	Bellevue, WA
F	22	Mike Auger	6 ft 7 in (2.01 m)	225 lb (102 kg)	So	New Hampton	Hopkinton, NH
G	23	Shawn Simmons	6 ft 4 in (1.93 m)	170 lb (77 kg)	So	Norfolk Academy	Virginia Beach, VA
G	24	Matt Howard	6 ft 4 in (1.93 m)	185 lb (84 kg)	Jr	A.C. Flora	Columbia, SC
G	25	Tyler Hamilton	6 ft 4 in (1.93 m)	195 lb (88 kg)	Fr	Cheshire Academy	Atlanta, GA
F	40	Dan Dwyer	6 ft 8 in (2.03 m)	225 lb (102 kg)	So	Fenwick	River Forest, IL
C	44	Collin McManus	6 ft 10 in (2.08 m)	230 lb (104 kg)	Fr	Northfield Mount Hermon	Bedford, NH
G		Matt MacDonald (I) (redshirt)	6 ft 5 in (1.96 m)	200 lb (91 kg)	Jr	Canisius; Fairleigh Dickinson	Eggertsville, NY

Head coach

- Steve Donahue (Ursinus)

Assistant coach(es)

- Nat Graham (Penn)
- Ira Bowman (Penn)
- Joe Mihalich, Jr. (Nazareth)

Legend

- (C) Team captain
- (S) Suspended
- (I) Ineligible
- (W) Walk-on
- Injured
- Current redshirt

Roster

== Schedule ==
Date time, TV	Opponent	Result	Record	Site (attendance) city, state
Regular season
11/13/2015*; 5:30 pm	Robert Morris	W 76–75	1–0	The Palestra (2,587); Philadelphia, PA
11/15/2015; 4:00 pm	Central Connecticut	W 77–61	2–0	The Palestra (1,246); Philadelphia, PA
11/17/2015*; 7:00 pm	at Delaware State	W 60-54	3–0	Memorial Hall (1,058); Dover, DE
11/21/2015*; 3:00 pm, P12N	at Washington	L 67–104	3–1	Alaska Airlines Arena (6,495); Seattle, WA
11/25/2015*; 7:00 pm	La Salle	W 80–64	4–1	The Palestra (3,122); Philadelphia, PA
11/29/2015*; 2:00 pm	at Lafayette	L 86–92	4–2	Kirby Sports Center (1,573); Easton, PA
12/02/2015*; 7:00 pm	Navy	L 59–65	4–3	The Palestra (1,377); Philadelphia, PA
12/05/2015*; 6:00 pm	at George Mason	L 44–63	4–4	EagleBank Arena (3,838); Fairfax, VA
12/09/2015*; 7:00 pm	Temple	L 73–77	4–5	The Palestra (4,378); Philadelphia, PA
12/19/2015*; 2:30 pm	Ursinus	W 73–66	5–5	The Palestra (1,407); Philadelphia, PA
12/22/2015*; 7:00 pm	at Drexel; Battle of 33rd Street	L 52–53 ^{OT}	5–6	Daskalakis Athletic Center (1,334); Philadelphia, PA
12/28/2015*; 7:00 pm, FS1	at No. 16 Villanova	L 57–77	5–7	The Pavilion (6,500); Villanova, PA
01/02/2016*; 1:00 pm	Binghamton	W 80–45	6–7	The Palestra (2,104); Philadelphia, PA
01/09/2016; 4:30 pm, FS1	Princeton; Rivalry	L 71–73	6–8 (0–1)	The Palestra (5,029); Philadelphia, PA
01/20/2016*; 9:00 pm	Saint Joseph's	L 60–75	6–9	The Palestra (8,030); Philadelphia, PA
01/29/2016; 7:00 pm	at Yale	L 58–81	6–10 (0–2)	John J. Lee Amphitheater (1,666); New Haven, CT
01/30/2016; 8:00 pm, ASN	at Brown	L 83–89	6–11 (0–3)	Pizzitola Sports Center (2,165); Providence, RI
02/05/2016; 6:00 pm, ASN	Dartmouth	W 71–64	7–11 (1–3)	The Palestra (2,889); Philadelphia, PA
02/06/2016; 7:00 pm	Harvard	W 67–57	8–11 (2–3)	The Palestra (4,018); Philadelphia, PA
02/12/2016; 7:00 pm	at Columbia	L 53–63	8–12 (2–4)	Levien Gymnasium (2,505); New York City, NY
02/13/2016; 6:00 pm	at Cornell	W 92–84	9–12 (3–4)	Newman Arena (1,237); Ithaca, NY
02/19/2016; 7:00 pm	Brown	W 79–74	10–12 (4–4)	The Palestra (3,335); Philadelphia, PA
02/20/2016; 7:00 pm	Yale	L 58–79	10–13 (4–5)	The Palestra (3,246); Philadelphia, PA
02/26/2016; 7:00 pm	Cornell	W 79–67	11–13 (5–5)	The Palestra (2,058); Philadelphia, PA
02/27/2016; 7:00 pm	Columbia	L 65–93	11–14 (5–6)	The Palestra (3,378); Philadelphia, PA
03/04/2016; 7:00 pm	at Dartmouth	L 64–72	11–15 (5–7)	Leede Arena (922); Hanover, NH
03/05/2016; 7:00 pm	at Harvard	L 56–74	11–16 (5–8)	Lavietes Pavilion (2,195); Cambridge, MA
03/08/2016; 8:00 pm	at Princeton; Rivalry	L 71–72	11–17 (5–9)	Jadwin Gymnasium; Princeton, NJ
*Non-conference game. ^{#}Rankings from AP Poll. (#) Tournament seedings in parentheses. All times are in Eastern Time.
