= 2015–16 Columbia Lions men's basketball team =

American college basketball season

2015–16 Columbia Lions men's basketball

CIT champions
- Conference: Ivy League
- Record: 25–10 (10–4 Ivy)
- Head coach: Kyle Smith (6th season)
- Assistant coaches: Derrick Phelps; Kevin Hovde; Adam Hood
- Home arena: Levien Gymnasium

2015–16 Ivy League men's basketball standings
	Conf.				Overall
Team	W		L	PCT	W		L	PCT
x-Yale †	13	–	1	.929	23	–	7	.767
Princeton	12	–	2	.857	22	–	7	.759
Columbia	10	–	4	.714	25	–	10	.714
Harvard	6	–	8	.429	14	–	16	.467
Penn	5	–	9	.357	11	–	17	.393
Dartmouth	4	–	10	.286	10	–	18	.357
Cornell	3	–	11	.214	10	–	18	.357
Brown	3	–	11	.214	8	–	20	.286
x – Ivy League champions † – NCAA Tournament participant

The 2015–16 Columbia Lions men's basketball team represented Columbia University during the 2015–16 NCAA Division I men's basketball season. The Lions, led by sixth year head coach Kyle Smith, played their home games at Levien Gymnasium and were members of the Ivy League. They finished the season 25–10, 10–4 in Ivy League play to finish in third place. They were invited to the CollegeInsider.com Tournament where they defeated Norfolk State, Ball State, NJIT and UC Irvine to become CIT champions.

On March 30, one day after winning the CIT, head coach Kyle Smith resigned to become the head coach at San Francisco. He finished at Columbia with a six-year record of 101–82.

== Previous season ==
The Lions finished the season 13–15, 5–9 in Ivy League play to finish in a tie for fifth place.

== Departures ==
Name	Number	Pos.	Height	Weight	Year	Hometown	Notes
Steve Frankoski	5	G	6'2"	190	Senior	Florham Park, NJ	Graduated
Zach En'Wezoh	11	F	6'8"	225	Junior	Kennewick, WA	Left the team for personal reasons
Noah Springwater	21	G	6'3"	180	Senior	San Francisco, CA	Graduated
Meiko Lyles	22	G	6'3"	200	Senior	Nashville, TN	Graduated
Cory Osetkowski	23	C	6'11"	270	Senior	Rancho Santa Fe, CA	Graduated

== Recruiting ==
College recruiting information
Name	Hometown	School	Height	Weight	Commit date
Quinton Adlesh #118 SG	San Luis Obispo, CA	Mission College Prep	6 ft 1 in (1.85 m)	185 lb (84 kg)	Nov 14, 2015
Quinton Adlesh #118 SG	Recruit ratings: Scout: Rivals: (60)				
John Sica #106 PF	Delmar, NY	Bethlehem Central High School	6 ft 7 in (2.01 m)	210 lb (95 kg)	Sep 14, 2014
John Sica #106 PF	Recruit ratings: Scout: Rivals: (58)				
Peter Barba; SG	Hudson, OH	Western Reserve Academy	6 ft 5 in (1.96 m)	180 lb (82 kg)	Jun 6, 2014
Peter Barba; SG	Recruit ratings: Scout: Rivals: (NR)				
Rodney Hunter; SG	Cape Coral, FL	Mariner High School	6 ft 5 in (1.96 m)	185 lb (84 kg)	Dec 16, 2014
Rodney Hunter; SG	Recruit ratings: Scout: Rivals: (NR)				
Shane Eberle; C	Woodbine, MD	Elev8 Basketball Academy	6 ft 10 in (2.08 m)	230 lb (100 kg)	Feb 14, 2015
Shane Eberle; C	Recruit ratings: Scout: Rivals: (NR)				
Overall recruit ranking:
Note: In many cases, Scout, Rivals, 247Sports, On3, and ESPN may conflict in their listings of height and weight.; In these cases, the average was taken. ESPN grades are on a 100-point scale.; Sources: "2015 Team Ranking". Rivals.

=== Recruiting class of 2016 ===
College recruiting information (2016)
Name	Hometown	School	Height	Weight	Commit date
Patrick Tape; PF	Matthews, NC	Queen's Grant High School	6 ft 9 in (2.06 m)	N/A	Jun 28, 2015
Patrick Tape; PF	Recruit ratings: Scout: Rivals: (NR)				
Karthik Reddy; PF	San Antonio, TX	Saint Mary's High School	6 ft 7 in (2.01 m)	N/A	Jun 10, 2015
Karthik Reddy; PF	Recruit ratings: Scout: Rivals: (NR)				
Overall recruit ranking:
Note: In many cases, Scout, Rivals, 247Sports, On3, and ESPN may conflict in their listings of height and weight.; In these cases, the average was taken. ESPN grades are on a 100-point scale.; Sources: "2016 Team Ranking". Rivals.

== Roster ==
2015–16 Columbia Lions men's basketball team
Players
Coaches

Pos.	#	Name	Height	Weight	Year	Previous school	Hometown
G	0	Kyle Castlin	6 ft 4 in (1.93 m)	180 lb (82 kg)	So	Hillsgrove	Marietta, GA
F	1	Jeff Coby	6 ft 8 in (2.03 m)	220 lb (100 kg)	Jr	Choate Rosemary Hall/Sagemont	Pembroke Pines, FL
G	2	Isaac Cohen	6 ft 4 in (1.93 m)	220 lb (100 kg)	Sr	Orlando Christian Prep	Orlando, FL
G	3	Grant Mullins	6 ft 3 in (1.91 m)	175 lb (79 kg)	Sr	REDA/Notre Dame	Burlington, ON
G/F	4	Rodney Hunter	6 ft 5 in (1.96 m)	185 lb (84 kg)	Fr	Mariner	Cape Coral, FL
G	5	C. J. Davis	6 ft 2 in (1.88 m)	200 lb (91 kg)	Fr	Peddie School/Archbishop Molloy	Far Rockaway, NY
G	10	Quinton Adlesh	6 ft 0 in (1.83 m)	190 lb (86 kg)	Fr	Mission College Prep	Arroyo Grande, CA
F	11	Lukas Meisner	6 ft 8 in (2.03 m)	210 lb (95 kg)	Fr	IGS Franzsches Feld	Braunschweig, Germany
G	12	Maodo Lo	6 ft 3 in (1.91 m)	190 lb (86 kg)	Sr	Wilbraham & Monson	Berlin, Germany
F	13	Alex Rosenberg	6 ft 7 in (2.01 m)	220 lb (100 kg)	RS Sr	Millburn	Short Hills, NJ
G	14	Kendall Jackson	5 ft 8 in (1.73 m)	155 lb (70 kg)	Jr	Suffield Academy/Bishop O'Dowd	Union City, CA
G	15	Nate Hickman	6 ft 4 in (1.93 m)	175 lb (79 kg)	So	Peddie School	Wilmington, DE
G	20	Paddy Quinn	6 ft 1 in (1.85 m)	190 lb (86 kg)	Sr	Don Bosco Prep	Ramsey, NJ
G	21	Peter Barba	6 ft 5 in (1.96 m)	190 lb (86 kg)	Fr	Western Reserve Academy	Chagrin Falls, OH
F	24	John Sica	6 ft 7 in (2.01 m)	195 lb (88 kg)	Fr	Bethlehem Central	Delmar, NY
F	32	Chris McComber	6 ft 8 in (2.03 m)	235 lb (107 kg)	Jr	John McCrae Secondary School/REDA	Nepean, ON
F	33	Luke Petrasek	6 ft 10 in (2.08 m)	215 lb (98 kg)	Jr	Northport	East Northport, NY
C	44	Shane Eberle	6 ft 10 in (2.08 m)	245 lb (111 kg)	Fr	Ourt Lake of Good Counsel	Woodbine, MD
C	52	Connor Voss	7 ft 1 in (2.16 m)	250 lb (113 kg)	Jr	Cathedral	St. Cloud, MN

Head coach

- Kyle Smith (Hamilton)

Assistant coach(es)

- Derrick Phelps (North Carolina)
- Kevin Hovde (Richmond)
- Adam Hood (Air Force)

Legend

- (C) Team captain
- (S) Suspended
- (I) Ineligible
- (W) Walk-on
- Injured
- Current redshirt

Roster

== Schedule ==
Date time, TV	Opponent	Result	Record	Site (attendance) city, state
Non-conference regular season
11/13/2015*; 11:00 am	Kean	W 107–62	1–0	Levien Gymnasium (878); New York City, NY
11/16/2015*; 10:00 pm, ESPN3	at Kansas State; CBE Hall of Fame Classic	L 71–81	1–1	Bramlage Coliseum (11,368); Manhattan, KS
11/20/2015*; 8:00 pm, ESPN3	at Northwestern; CBE Hall of Fame Classic	L 80–83 ^{OT}	1–2	Welsh-Ryan Arena (6,117); Evanston, IL
11/22/2015*; 4:00 pm	Lehigh	W 88–61	2–2	Levien Gymnasium (1,011); New York City, NY
11/24/2015*; 4:00 pm, ESPN3	Wofford; CBE Hall of Fame Classic	W 70–59	3–2	Levien Gymnasium (840); New York City, NY
11/27/2015*; 7:00 pm	at Fairfield; CBE Hall of Fame Classic	L 81–82 ^{OT}	3–3	Webster Bank Arena (1,887); Fairfield, CT
11/28/2015*; 7:00 pm	Longwood	L 69–70	3–4	Levien Gymnasium (983); New York City, NY
12/02/2015*; 7:00 pm	at Bucknell	W 72–61	4–4	Sojka Pavilion (2,465); Lewisburg, PA
12/04/2015*; 7:00 pm	Saint Joseph's	L 78–80	4–5	Levien Gymnasium (1,088); New York City, NY
12/06/2015*; 2:00 pm	Delaware	W 82–69	5–5	Levien Gymnasium (989); New York City, NY
12/09/2015*; 7:00 pm	at Manhattan	W 72–71	6–5	Draddy Gymnasium (714); Riverdale, NY
12/12/2015*; 7:00 pm	NJIT	W 65–56	7–5	Levien Gymnasium (1,244); New York City, NY
12/14/2015*; 2:00 pm	Robert Morris	W 78–71	8–5	Levien Gymnasium (462); New York City, NY
12/28/2015*; 7:00 pm	Howard	W 72–59	9–5	Levien Gymnasium (1,514); New York City, NY
01/02/2016*; 7:00 pm	at Stony Brook	L 60–69	9–6	Island Federal Credit Union Arena (3,624); Stony Brook, NY
01/06/2016*; 7:00 pm	Maryland Eastern Shore	W 81–75	10–6	Levien Gymnasium (868); New York City, NY
01/09/2016*; 7:00 pm	Central Penn	W 96–68	11–6	Levien Gymnasium (785); New York City, NY
Ivy League regular season
01/16/2016; 7:00 pm	Cornell	W 74–70	12–6 (1–0)	Levien Gymnasium (2,236); New York City, NY
01/23/2016; 4:00 pm, ESPN3	at Cornell	W 79–68	13–6 (2–0)	Newman Arena (3,935); Ithaca, NY
01/29/2016; 7:00 pm	at Dartmouth	W 77–60	14–6 (3–0)	Leede Arena (835); Hanover, NH
01/30/2016; 7:00 pm	at Harvard	W 55–54	15–6 (4–0)	Lavietes Pavilion (2,195); Cambridge, MA
02/05/2016; 5:00 pm, FS1	at Yale	L 72–86	15–7 (4–1)	John J. Lee Amphitheater (2,219); New Haven, CT
02/06/2016; 7:00 pm	at Brown	W 77–73	16–7 (5–1)	Pizzitola Sports Center (953); Providence, RI
02/12/2016; 7:00 pm, ESPN3	Penn	W 63–53	17–7 (6–1)	Levien Gymnasium (2,505); New York City, NY
02/13/2016; 7:00 pm, ESPN3	Princeton	L 83–88 ^{OT}	17–8 (6–2)	Levien Gymnasium (2,633); New York City, NY
02/19/2016; 6:00 pm, ASN	Harvard	W 90–76	18–8 (7–2)	Levien Gymnasium (2,587); New York City, NY
02/20/2016; 7:00 pm	Dartmouth	W 73–54	19–8 (8–2)	Levien Gymnasium (2,349); New York City, NY
02/26/2016; 6:00 pm, ASN	at Princeton	L 83–88	19–9 (8–3)	Jadwin Gymnasium (3,121); Princeton, NJ
02/27/2016; 7:00 pm	at Penn	W 93–65	20–9 (9–3)	Palestra (3,378); Philadelphia, PA
03/04/2016; 7:00 pm	Brown	W 66–63	21–9 (10–3)	Levien Gymnasium (1,937); New York City, NY
03/05/2016; 7:00 pm	Yale	L 55–71	21–10 (10–4)	Levien Gymnasium (2,720); New York City, NY
CIT
03/16/2016*; 7:00 pm	Norfolk State; First round	W 86–54	22–10	Levien Gymnasium (1,037); New York City, NY
03/23/2016*; 7:00 pm	Ball State; Quarterfinals	W 69–67	23–10	Levien Gymnasium (1,397); New York City, NY
03/27/2016*; 6:00 pm, CBSSN	NJIT; Semifinals	W 80–65	24–10	Levien Gymnasium (1,249); New York City, NY
03/29/2016*; 7:00 pm, CBSSN	UC Irvine; Championship game	W 73–67	25–10	Levien Gymnasium (2,603); New York City, NY
*Non-conference game. (#) Tournament seedings in parentheses. All times are in Eastern Time.
