= 2015–16 Yale Bulldogs men's basketball team =

American college basketball season

2015–16 Yale Bulldogs men's basketball

Ivy League champions

NCAA tournament, Second Round
- Conference: Ivy League
- Record: 23–7 (13–1 Ivy)
- Head coach: James Jones (17th season)
- Assistant coaches: Matt Kingsley; Justin Simon; Anthony Goins
- Home arena: John J. Lee Amphitheater

2015–16 Ivy League men's basketball standings
	Conf.				Overall
Team	W		L	PCT	W		L	PCT
x-Yale †	13	–	1	.929	23	–	7	.767
Princeton	12	–	2	.857	22	–	7	.759
Columbia	10	–	4	.714	25	–	10	.714
Harvard	6	–	8	.429	14	–	16	.467
Penn	5	–	9	.357	11	–	17	.393
Dartmouth	4	–	10	.286	10	–	18	.357
Cornell	3	–	11	.214	10	–	18	.357
Brown	3	–	11	.214	8	–	20	.286
x – Ivy League champions † – NCAA Tournament participant

The 2015–16 Yale Bulldogs men's basketball team represented Yale University during the 2015–16 NCAA Division I men's basketball season. The Bulldogs, led by seventeenth-year head coach James Jones, played their home games at John J. Lee Amphitheater of the Payne Whitney Gymnasium and were members of the Ivy League. They finished the season 23–7, 13–1 in Ivy League play, to win the Ivy League championship. They received the Ivy's automatic bid to the NCAA tournament, their first NCAA bid since 1962, where they defeated Baylor in the first round to advance to the second round where they lost to Duke.

== Previous season ==
The Bulldogs lost their one-game playoff against Harvard 53–51. Despite having posted an 11–3 Ivy League record and a 22–10 overall record the Bulldogs were not invited to a postseason tournament.

== Departures ==
Name	Number	Pos.	Height	Weight	Year	Hometown	Notes
Armani Cotton	12	G	6'7"	215	Senior	New York City, NY	Graduated
Javier Duren	20	G	6'4"	185	Senior	St. Louis, MO	Graduated
Grey Kelley	32	F	6'8"	225	Senior	Newton, MA	Graduated
Matt Townsend	42	F	6'7"	240	Senior	Chappaqua, NY	Graduated

== Recruiting ==
College recruiting information
Name	Hometown	School	Height	Weight	Commit date
Alex Copeland #78 PG	North Hollywood, CA	Harvard-Westlake High School	6 ft 2 in (1.88 m)	165 lb (75 kg)	Jun 7, 2014
Alex Copeland #78 PG	Recruit ratings: Scout: Rivals: (68)				
Eli Lininger #83 SF	Eugene, OR	South Eugene High School	6 ft 5 in (1.96 m)	210 lb (95 kg)	Oct 21, 2013
Eli Lininger #83 SF	Recruit ratings: Scout: Rivals: (67)				
Matt Greene #121 PF	New York City, NY	Hotchkiss School	6 ft 6 in (1.98 m)	210 lb (95 kg)	Jul 28, 2014
Matt Greene #121 PF	Recruit ratings: Scout: Rivals: (55)				
Trey Phills; SG	Charlotte, NC	Charlotte Christian School	6 ft 2 in (1.88 m)	180 lb (82 kg)	Sep 14, 2014
Trey Phills; SG	Recruit ratings: Scout: Rivals: (NR)				
Blake Reynolds; PF	Jackson, MO	Jackson High School	6 ft 7 in (2.01 m)	190 lb (86 kg)	Sep 25, 2014
Blake Reynolds; PF	Recruit ratings: Scout: Rivals: (NR)				
Overall recruit ranking:
Note: In many cases, Scout, Rivals, 247Sports, On3, and ESPN may conflict in their listings of height and weight.; In these cases, the average was taken. ESPN grades are on a 100-point scale.; Sources: "2015 Team Ranking". Rivals.

=== Recruiting class of 2016 ===
College recruiting information (2016)
Name	Hometown	School	Height	Weight	Commit date
Eric Monroe #63 PG	San Diego, CA	Saint Augustine High School	6 ft 2 in (1.88 m)	170 lb (77 kg)	
Eric Monroe #63 PG	Recruit ratings: Scout: Rivals: (69)				
Miye Oni; SF	Suffield, CT	Suffield Academy	6 ft 6 in (1.98 m)	190 lb (86 kg)	Jul 1, 2015
Miye Oni; SF	Recruit ratings: Scout: Rivals: (NR)				
Overall recruit ranking:
Note: In many cases, Scout, Rivals, 247Sports, On3, and ESPN may conflict in their listings of height and weight.; In these cases, the average was taken. ESPN grades are on a 100-point scale.; Sources: "2016 Team Ranking". Rivals.

== Roster ==
2015–16 Yale Bulldogs men's basketball team
Players
Coaches

Pos.	#	Name	Height	Weight	Year	Previous school	Hometown
G	00	Khaliq Ghani	6 ft 5 in (1.96 m)	205 lb (93 kg)	Sr	Loyola	Inglewood, CA
G	1	Anthony Dallier	6 ft 6 in (1.98 m)	190 lb (86 kg)	Jr	Northfield Mount Hermon	Wexford, PA
G	3	Alex Copeland	6 ft 3 in (1.91 m)	170 lb (77 kg)	Fr	Harvard-Westlake	Los Angeles, CA
G	4	Jake Montague	6 ft 0 in (1.83 m)	185 lb (84 kg)	Sr	Brentwood	Brentwood, TN
G/F	5	Eric Anderson	6 ft 7 in (2.01 m)	215 lb (98 kg)	So	Haverford School	West Chester, PA
G	11	Makai Mason	6 ft 1 in (1.85 m)	185 lb (84 kg)	So	Hotchkiss School	Greenfield, MA
G	13	Trey Phills	6 ft 2 in (1.88 m)	185 lb (84 kg)	Fr	Charlotte Christian	Charlotte, NC
F	20	Matt Greene	6 ft 7 in (2.01 m)	205 lb (93 kg)	Fr	Hotchkiss School	Brooklyn, NY
G	21	Nick Victor	6 ft 5 in (1.96 m)	220 lb (100 kg)	Sr	Winchendon	Dallas, TX
F	22	Justin Sears	6 ft 8 in (2.03 m)	205 lb (93 kg)	Sr	Plainfield	Plainfield, NJ
G	23	Landon Russell	6 ft 2 in (1.88 m)	180 lb (82 kg)	So	Nolan Catholic	Fort Worth, TX
G	25	A. J. Edwards	6 ft 5 in (1.96 m)	190 lb (86 kg)	Jr	South Kent School	Seattle, WA
F	32	Blake Reynolds	6 ft 7 in (2.01 m)	220 lb (100 kg)	Fr	Jackson	Jackson, MO
G	34	Thomas Ryan	6 ft 4 in (1.93 m)	190 lb (86 kg)	Fr	Hotchkiss School	New York City, NY
F	35	Brandon Sherrod	6 ft 6 in (1.98 m)	240 lb (109 kg)	Sr	Choate Rosemary Hall	Bridgeport, CT
F	42	Eli Lininger	6 ft 6 in (1.98 m)	200 lb (91 kg)	Fr	South Eugene	Eugene, OR
F	44	Sam Downey	6 ft 9 in (2.06 m)	230 lb (104 kg)	Jr	Lake Forest	Lake Forest, IL
F	50	Sem Kroon	6 ft 10 in (2.08 m)	240 lb (109 kg)	So	Northfield Mount Hermon	Riverside, CT

Head coach

- James Jones (Albany)

Assistant coach(es)

- Matt Kingsley (Wesleyan)
- Justin Simon (Yale)
- Anthony Goins (St. John's)

Legend

- (C) Team captain
- (S) Suspended
- (I) Ineligible
- (W) Walk-on
- Injured
- Current redshirt

Roster
Last update: September 2, 2024

== Schedule ==
Date time, TV	Rank^{#}	Opponent^{#}	Result	Record	Site (attendance) city, state
Non-conference regular season
November 13, 2015*; 3:00 p.m.		vs. Fairfield; Connecticut 6 Classic	W 70–57	1–0	William H. Detrick Gymnasium; New Britain, CT
November 16, 2015*; 7:00 p.m.		Sacred Heart; Connecticut 6 Classic	W 99–77	2–0	John J. Lee Amphitheater (778); New Haven, CT
November 19, 2015*; 7:00 p.m.		at Lehigh	W 79–67	3–0	Stabler Arena (995); Bethlehem, PA
November 22, 2015*; 4:30 p.m., ESPNews		at SMU	L 69–71	3–1	Moody Coliseum (6,852); Dallas, TX
November 25, 2015*; 7:00 p.m., ESPNU		at No. 6 Duke	L 61–80	3–2	Cameron Indoor Stadium (9,314); Durham, NC
November 29, 2015*; 2:00 p.m.		at Albany	L 54–88	3–3	SEFCU Arena (2,418); Albany, NY
December 2, 2015*; 7:00 p.m.		Bryant	W 79–40	4–3	John J. Lee Amphitheater (696); New Haven, CT
December 5, 2015*; 2:00 p.m.		Vermont	W 72–54	5–3	John J. Lee Amphitheater (1,114); New Haven, CT
December 9, 2015*; 8:00 p.m., ESPN3		at Illinois	L 65–69	5–4	State Farm Center (11,648); Champaign, IL
December 13, 2015*; 4:00 p.m., P12N		at USC	L 56–68	5–5	Galen Center (4,117); Los Angeles, CA
December 30, 2015*; 7:00 p.m.		at Central Connecticut	W 62–42	6–5	William H. Detrick Gymnasium (1,237); New Britain, CT
January 2, 2016*; 7:00 p.m.		at Hartford	W 88–53	7–5	Chase Arena at Reich Family Pavilion (1,133); Hartford, CT
January 6, 2016*; 7:00 p.m.		NJIT	W 83–65	8–5	John J. Lee Amphitheater (886); New Haven, CT
January 8, 2016*; 7:00 p.m.		Daniel Webster	W 94–53	9–5	John J. Lee Amphitheater (622); New Haven, CT
Ivy League regular season
January 16, 2016; 5:00 p.m.		Brown	W 77–68	10–5 (1–0)	John J. Lee Amphitheater (1,878); New Haven, CT
January 23, 2016; 5:00 p.m., ESPN3		at Brown	W 90–66	11–5 (2–0)	Pizzitola Sports Center (1,302); Providence, RI
January 29, 2016; 7:00 p.m.		Penn	W 81–58	12–5 (3–0)	John J. Lee Amphitheater (1,666); New Haven, CT
January 30, 2016; 7:00 p.m.		Princeton	W 79–75	13–5 (4–0)	John J. Lee Amphitheater (2,187); New Haven, CT
February 5, 2016; 5:00 p.m., FS1		Columbia	W 86–72	14–5 (5–0)	John J. Lee Amphitheater (2,219); New Haven, CT
February 6, 2016; 7:00 p.m.		Cornell	W 83–52	15–5 (6–0)	John J. Lee Amphitheater (1,684); New Haven, CT
February 12, 2016; 7:00 p.m.		at Dartmouth	W 75–65	16–5 (7–0)	Leede Arena (787); Hanover, NH
February 13, 2016; 7:00 p.m.		at Harvard	W 67–55	17–5 (8–0)	Lavietes Pavilion (2,195); Cambridge, MA
February 19, 2016; 7:00 p.m.		at Princeton	L 63–75	17–6 (8–1)	Jadwin Gymnasium (4,211); Princeton, NJ
February 20, 2016; 6:00 p.m.		at Penn	W 79–58	18–6 (9–1)	The Palestra (3,246); Philadelphia, PA
February 26, 2016; 7:00 p.m., FS1		Harvard	W 59–50	19–6 (10–1)	John J. Lee Amphitheater (2,532); New Haven, CT
February 27, 2016; 8:00 p.m., ASN		Dartmouth	W 76–71 ^{OT}	20–6 (11–1)	John J. Lee Amphitheater (2,018); New Haven, CT
March 4, 2016; 6:00 p.m., ASN		at Cornell	W 88–64	21–6 (12–1)	Newman Arena (1,734); Ithaca, NY
March 5, 2016; 7:00 p.m.		at Columbia	W 71–55	22–6 (13–1)	Levien Gymnasium (2,720); New York City, NY
NCAA tournament
March 17, 2016*; 2:45 p.m., CBS	(12 W)	vs. (5 W) No. 21 Baylor; First Round	W 79–75	23–6	Dunkin' Donuts Center (11,656); Providence, RI
March 19, 2016*; 2:40 p.m., CBS	(12 W)	vs. (4 W) No. 19 Duke; Second Round	L 64–71	23–7	Dunkin' Donuts Center (11,679); Providence, RI
*Non-conference game. ^{#}Rankings from AP poll. (#) Tournament seedings in parentheses. W=West. All times are in Eastern.
