= 2015–16 Ivy League men's basketball season =

- League: NCAA Division I
- Sport: Basketball
- Duration: January 9 – March 8, 2016
- Teams: 8
- TV partner: Ivy League Digital Network

Regular season
- Champions: Yale
- Season MVP: Justin Sears, Yale

Basketball seasons
- ← 2014–15 2016-17 →

2015–16 Ivy League men's basketball standings
| | Conf. | | | | Overall |
| Team | W | | L | PCT | W | | L | PCT |
|---|---|---|---|---|---|---|---|---|
| x-Yale † | 13 | – | 1 | .929 | 23 | – | 7 | .767 |
| Princeton | 12 | – | 2 | .857 | 22 | – | 7 | .759 |
| Columbia | 10 | – | 4 | .714 | 25 | – | 10 | .714 |
| Harvard | 6 | – | 8 | .429 | 14 | – | 16 | .467 |
| Penn | 5 | – | 9 | .357 | 11 | – | 17 | .393 |
| Dartmouth | 4 | – | 10 | .286 | 10 | – | 18 | .357 |
| Cornell | 3 | – | 11 | .214 | 10 | – | 18 | .357 |
| Brown | 3 | – | 11 | .214 | 8 | – | 20 | .286 |
x – Ivy League champions † – NCAA Tournament participant

The 2015–16 Ivy League men's basketball season marked the continuation of the annual tradition of competitive basketball among Ivy League members. The tradition began when the league was formed during the 1956–57 season and its history extends to the predecessor Eastern Intercollegiate Basketball League, which was formed in 1902.

Yale earned the league title after finishing the regular season 13–1 within the Ivy League. Yale earned the league's automatic bid to the 2016 NCAA Men's Division I Basketball Tournament.

Justin Sears of Yale was named Ivy League Men's Basketball Player of the Year.

== All-Ivy Teams ==
First Team All-Ivy
| | School | Class | Position |
|---|---|---|---|
| Maodo Lô* | Columbia | Senior | Guard |
| Brandon Sherrod* | Yale | Senior | Forward |
| Henry Caruso* | Princeton | Junior | Guard |
| Makai Mason* | Yale | Sophomore | Guard |
| Justin Sears* | Yale | Junior | Forward |

*Unanimous

Second Team All-Ivy
| | School | Class | Position |
|---|---|---|---|
| Cedric Kuakumensah | Brown | Senior | Forward |
| Evan Boudreaux | Dartmouth | Senior | Forward |
| Darien Nelson-Henry | Penn | Senior | Center |
| Zena Edsomwan | Harvard | Junior | Forward |
| Grant Mullins | Columbia | Junior | Guard |
| Matt Morgan | Cornell | Freshman | Guard |
| Spencer Weisz | Princeton | Junior | Forward |

== NCAA tournament ==
| Seed | Region | School | First Four | Round of 64 | Round of 32 | Sweet 16 | Elite Eight | Final Four | Championship |
|---|---|---|---|---|---|---|---|---|---|
| 13 | West | Yale | n/a | Defeated Baylor, 79–75 | Eliminated by Duke, 71–64 | | | | |
| | | W–L (%): | 0–0 – | 1–0 1.000 | 0–1 .000 | 0–0 – | 0–0 – | 0–0 – | 0–0 –Total:1-1 .500 |
