= Jarrey Foster =

American basketball player (born 1996)

Free agent
- Position: Shooting guard

Personal information
- Born: December 10, 1996 (age 29) Houston, Texas, U.S.
- Listed height: 6 ft 6 in (1.98 m)
- Listed weight: 220 lb (100 kg)

Career information
- High school: North Shore (Houston, Texas)
- College: SMU (2015–2019)
- NBA draft: 2019: undrafted
- Playing career: 2023–present

Career history
- 2023–2024: Rip City Remix

Jarrey Foster (born December 9, 1996, in Houston) is an American professional basketball player who last played for the Rip City Remix of the NBA G League. He played college basketball for the SMU Mustangs of the AAC.

== College career ==
As a freshman, Foster posted 4.9 points per game. Foster averaged 9.9 points per game as a sophomore and made 44.4 percent of three-pointers. As a junior, Foster averaged 13.2 points, 5.9 rebounds, 2.7 assists and 1.2 blocks in 32 minutes per game. On January 17, 2018, he partially tore his ACL going for a layup five minutes into a game against Wichita State. Despite being initially labelled a knee sprain, Foster missed the rest of the season. His injury caused an increase in minutes for Jahmal McMurray. Foster declared for the 2018 NBA draft but did not hire an agent to preserve his collegiate eligibility. He announced he was returning to SMU on May 9. Coming into his senior season, Foster was named to the Preseason Second Team All-AAC. He was hampered by injuries and averaged 6.9 points, 3.6 rebounds, and 1.5 assists per game.

== Professional career ==
=== Rip City Remix (2023–2024) ===
On October 30, 2023, Foster joined the Rip City Remix of the NBA G League.

== Personal life ==
After graduating from SMU in 2019, Foster founded JF Elite Basketball, an organization that provides consulting, training and camps and clinics in the Dallas and Houston areas. In 2020, Foster established the apparel company, One Zero.
