= Ty Outlaw =

American basketball player (born 1995)

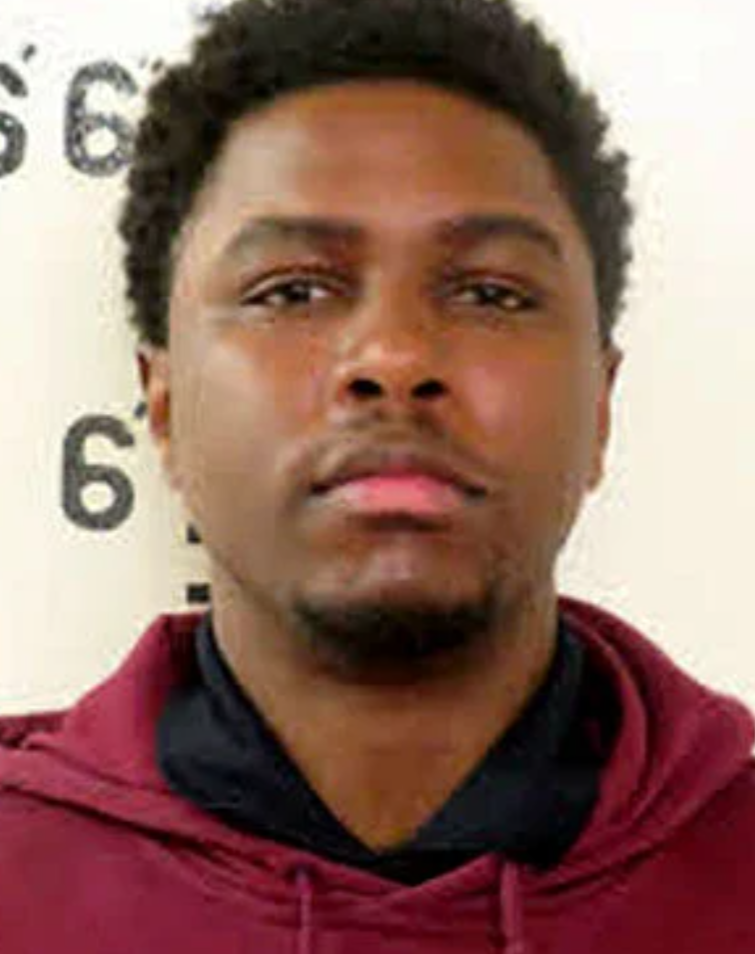
- Outlaw's Mugshot in 2025

Personal information
- Born: August 19, 1995 (age 31)
- Listed height: 6 ft 6 in (1.98 m)
- Listed weight: 240 lb (109 kg)

Career information
- High school: Person (Roxboro, North Carolina)
- College: UNC Greensboro (2013–2014); Lee College (2014–2015); Virginia Tech (2016–2019)
- NBA draft: 2019: undrafted
- Playing career: 2019–2022
- Position: Shooting guard / small forward
- Number: 42, 44

Career history
- 2019–2020: Lavrio
- 2022: Wisconsin Herd

Tyrone Khalil Outlaw (born August 19, 1995) is an American former professional basketball player who last played for the Wisconsin Herd of the NBA G League. He played college basketball for the Virginia Tech Hokies, the Lee College Runnin' Rebels and the UNC Greensboro Spartans.

== High school career ==
Outlaw grew up in Roxboro, North Carolina, the son of nurse Patricia Bumphus and former standout player Tyrone Outlaw Sr., and he was a fan of Duke basketball. He attended Person High School. As a senior, Outlaw averaged 24 points and 12 rebounds per game. He was a two-time All-State selection and played AAU basketball with Garner Road. Outlaw signed with UNC Greensboro.

== College career ==
As a freshman at UNC Greensboro, Outlaw averaged 5.4 points and 2.1 rebounds per game, shooting 41.3 percent from the field and 32.7 percent from behind the arc. He had a season-high 17 points against Georgia Southern. Following the season, Outlaw transferred to Lee College, choosing the Runnin' Rebels over Vincennes University. Outlaw ranked 12th in the nation in scoring amongst junior college players with 21.5 points per game. He opted to transfer to Virginia Tech.

During a checkup, it was discovered that Outlaw had the rare heart condition hypertrophic cardiomyopathy. He was forced to sit out the 2014–15 season and not even lift weights until January 2015. Outlaw changed his diet and took a high blood pressure medication, and in May he was cleared to resume playing basketball. On February 27, 2017, he scored a career-high 24 points in a 66–61 victory against Miami (Fla.) and hit a Virginia Tech-record eight three-pointers. As a redshirt junior, Outlaw averaged 6.3 points per game, starting 14 of the final 16 games. During a pickup game in July 2017, he tore his ACL, forcing him to miss the following season. He was granted a sixth year of eligibility by the NCAA. Outlaw posted 10 points and a team-high 11 rebounds in the second round of the NCAA Tournament against Liberty. On March 20, he was charged but found not guilty for drug possession after marijuana was discovered when a search warrant was issued for the apartment he shared with former teammate Chris Clarke. After passing a drug screen, coach Buzz Williams allowed Outlaw to play in the Sweet 16 game against Duke, which the Hokies lost in the final seconds. He finished the season averaging 8.6 points and 5.2 rebounds per game.

== Professional career ==
On August 11, 2019, Outlaw signed his first professional contract with Lavrio of the Greek Basket League. In 19 games, he averaged 4.8 points and 2.2 rebounds per contest.

=== Wisconsin Herd (2022) ===
On January 8, 2022, Outlaw was acquired via available player pool by the Wisconsin Herd. He was then later waived on January 11, 2022.

== Personal life ==
In November 2023, while working as a social studies teacher at Person High School, Outlaw was charged with having a sexual relationship with a student.

In February 2025, Outlaw was charged with assault against his pregnant wife.
