= Escuela Normal Superior Moíses Sáenz Garza =

Normal school in Monterrey, Mexico

Escuela Normal Superior "Profr. Moisés Sáenz Garza"
- ENS Moisés Sáenz Garza Shield
- Motto: "En la vocación del maestro y en la nobleza de la juventud, confiamos"
- Motto in English: In the vocation of the teacher and in the nobility of the youth, we trust
- Type: Public
- Established: 3 November 1961
- Rector: Dr. Pablo Cervantes Martínez
- Location: Monterrey, Nuevo León, Mexico
- Colors: Brown and yellow
- Website: www.normalsuperior.com.mx

The Escuela Normal "Moisés Sáenz Garza" is a normal school in Monterrey. Eduardo Livas Villarreal, then governor of Nuevo León and Profr. Ciro R. Cantú (First Dean) founded the school in 1961.

In 1988, on the hundredth anniversary of the school’s founding, the name was changed to Escuela Normal "Moisés Sáenz Garza" in honor of Moisés Sáenz Garza, former Public Education Minister. He founded the system of secondary education in México in 1921, through a law proclaimed by President Plutarco Elías Calles.

The school offers a bachelor's degree in secondary education with specializations in Spanish Language, Mathematics, History, Geography, Physics, Chemistry, Biology, Civics and Ethics and Foreign Language-English. Since 1978, the Graduate School has offered postgraduate degrees in Educational Philosophy, with specializations in Elementary Education, Secondary education Vocational guidance, Adolescent Psychology, Human Sciences (History, Geography, Civics and Ethics), Natural and Exact Sciences, Spanish Literature and Mathematics Education at both Master’s and Doctorate levels.

The school also offers various diploma courses in Arts and Painting, Printmaking, Theatre, Music, Dance (including versions of Huapango, Danzon and Northern dance styles), as well as additional courses in Marching War Band and National Flag Escort, all of significant curricular value.

It is located on Venustiano Carranza avenue at the corner of Ruperto Martínez street in the Centro neighborhood of the city. It is an integral part of the Educational center "Venustiano Carranza" which includes an elementary school, a secondary school or Junior High School, a teacher research center (IIIEPE, Instituto de Investigación, Innovación y Estudios de Posgrado para la Educación) a principal square where the Marching War band of the Militarized Pentathlon rehearses, a gym for practicing racquetball and Pelota, and the regional offices of the Ministry of Education

In 2011, the Escuela Normal Superior celebrated its 50th anniversary, and in 2013 the Building of Arts and sciences was inaugurated to promote professionalism and teaching practice by Rodrigo Medina de la Cruz, governor of Nuevo León and Profr. Humberto Leal Martínez, the School Dean.
