= 2015–16 American Athletic Conference men's basketball season =

- League: NCAA Division I
- Sport: Basketball
- Duration: November 2015 through March 2016
- Teams: 11
- TV partner(s): ESPN, CBS, ASN

Regular Season
- Champions: Temple

Tournament
- Champions: Connecticut
- Runners-up: Memphis

American Athletic Conference men's basketball seasons
- ← 2014–15 2016–17 →

2015–16 American Athletic Conference men's basketball standings
	Conf.				Overall
Team	W		L	PCT	W		L	PCT
Temple	14	–	4	.778	21	–	12	.636
No. 24 SMU^{*}	13	–	5	.722	25	–	5	.833
Houston	12	–	6	.667	22	–	10	.688
Cincinnati	12	–	6	.667	22	–	11	.667
Tulsa	12	–	6	.667	20	–	12	.625
UConn †	11	–	7	.611	25	–	11	.694
Memphis	8	–	10	.444	19	–	15	.559
UCF	6	–	12	.333	12	–	18	.400
East Carolina	4	–	14	.222	12	–	20	.375
South Florida	4	–	14	.222	8	–	25	.242
Tulane	3	–	15	.167	12	–	22	.353
^{*} Ineligible for postseason due to postseason ban † American Athletic Conference tournament Champions; Rankings from AP poll

The 2015–16 American Athletic Conference men's basketball season took place between November 2015 and March 2016. Practices began in October 2015, with conference play beginning in December, and the season ended with the 2016 American Athletic Conference men's basketball tournament at the Amway Center in Orlando, FL. The season was the third since the split of the original Big East Conference into two separate leagues. The tournament had only 10 teams, as SMU is serving a postseason ban due to academic fraud and unethical conduct

== Preseason ==
At the 2015 American Athletic Conference media day on October 27, the conference released announced coaches predictions for standings and All-Conference teams

See Also: Men's Basketball Media Day October 27 In Orlando

=== 2015-16 Preseason Coaches' Poll ===
1. SMU (8) 98
2. Connecticut (2) 87
3. Cincinnati (1) 84
4. Tulsa 76
5. Memphis 59
6. Temple 54
7. Houston 48
8. East Carolina 31
9. UCF 30
10. USF 20
11. Tulane 11

(First-Place Votes) Points

==== Preseason All-AAC Teams ====
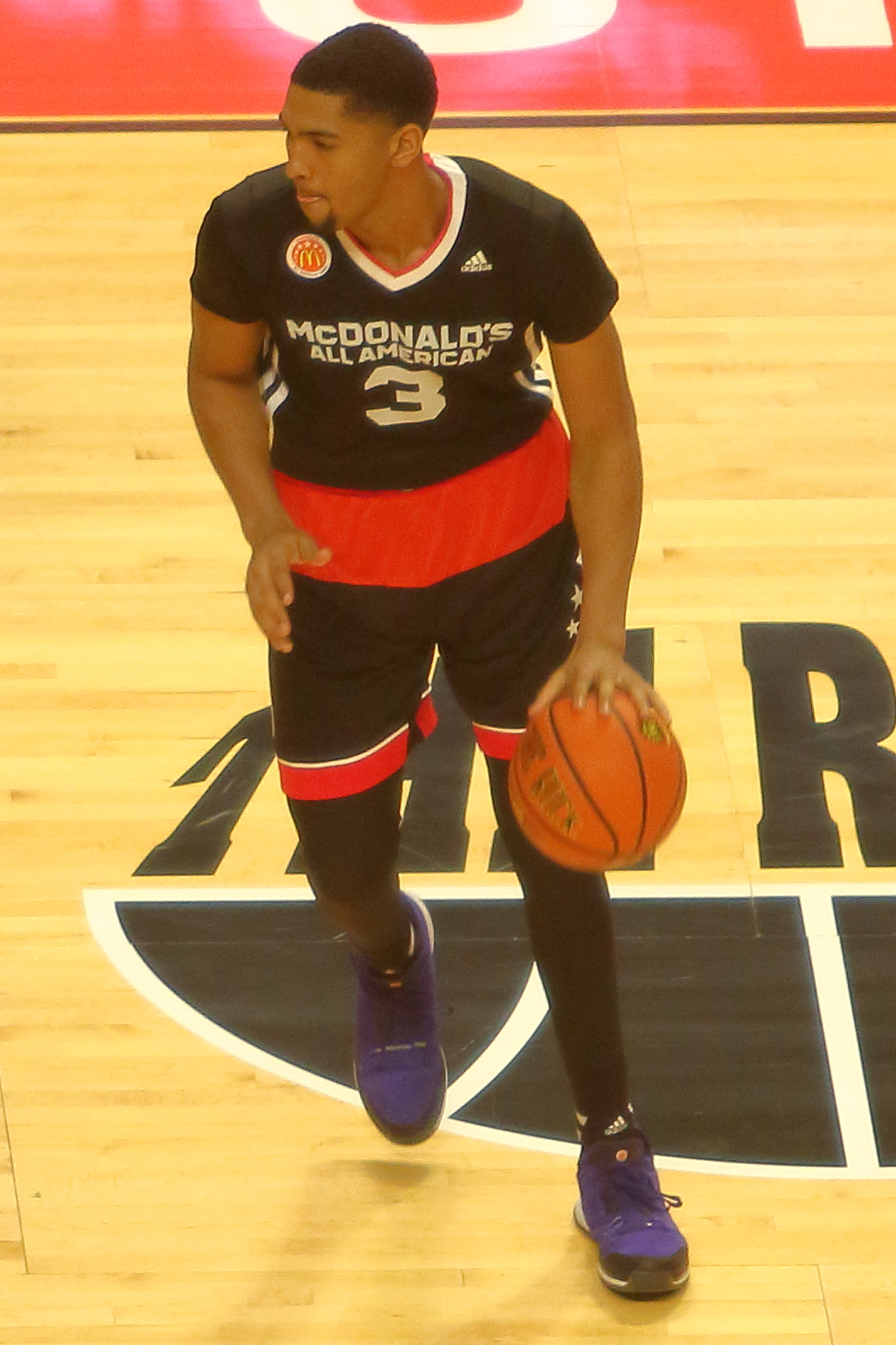
Dedric Lawson at the 2015 McDonald's All-American Boys Game

First Team	Second Team
Octavius Ellis, F, CIN; Daniel Hamilton, G/F, CONN; Markus Kennedy^{†}, F, SMU; Nic Moore^{†}, G, SMU; James Woodard, G, TULSA	Troy Caupain, G, CIN; Amida Brimah, C, CONN; Sterling Gibbs, G, CONN; Shaq Goodwin, F, MEM; Shaquille Harrison, G, TULSA

^{†} denotes unanimous selection

- American Athletic Preseason Player of the Year: Nic Moore, G, SMU
- American Athletic Preseason Rookie of the Year: Jalen Adams, G, CONN

== Rankings ==
Legend
Increase in ranking
Decrease in ranking

		Pre	Wk 2	Wk 3	Wk 4	Wk 5	Wk 6	Wk 7	Wk 8	Wk 9	Wk 10	Wk 11	Wk 12	Wk 13	Wk 14	Wk 15	Wk 16	Wk 17	Wk 18	Wk 19	Final
Cincinnati	AP	RV	RV	24	17	23	23	22	22	RV						RV	RV	RV	RV	RV	
Cincinnati	C	RV	RV	24	17	22	20	21	23	RV	RV								RV	RV	RV
Connecticut	AP	20	19	18	RV	RV	25	RV	RV	23			RV		RV		RV			RV	
Connecticut	C	т 24	24	21	RV	RV	RV	RV	RV	24	RV	RV	RV							RV	RV
East Carolina	AP																				
East Carolina	C																				
Houston	AP						RV														
Houston	C									RV	RV										
Memphis	AP																				
Memphis	C																				
SMU	AP	RV	RV	т25	22	19	18	18	17	15	10	8	13	12	16	21	24	24	25	24	
SMU	C																				
USF	AP																				
USF	C																				
Temple	AP																		RV		
Temple	C																				
Tulane	AP																				
Tulane	C																				
Tulsa	AP			RV																	
Tulsa	C	RV		RV																	
UCF	AP																				
UCF	C																				

== AAC regular season ==
=== Conference matrix ===
	Cincinnati	Connecticut	East Carolina	Houston	Memphis	SMU	USF	Temple	Tulane	Tulsa	UCF
vs. Cincinnati	—	0–2	0–2	1–1	1–1	1-1	0–2	2–0	0–1	1–1	0-1
vs. Connecticut	2–0	—	0–1	1–1	0–2	1-1	0–1	2–0	0–2	1–1	0-2
vs. East Carolina	2–0	1–0	—	1–0	1–1	2-0	1–1	1–1	1–1	2–0	2-0
vs. Houston	1–1	1–1	0–1	—	0–1	1-1	1–1	1–1	0–2	1–1	0-2
vs. Memphis	1–1	2–0	1–1	1–0	—	2-0	1–1	1–1	1–1	0–1	0-2
vs. SMU	1–1	1–1	0–2	1–1	0–2	—	0–2	1–0	0–2	1–1	0-1
vs. South Florida	2–0	1–0	1–1	1–1	1–1	2–0	—	2–0	1–1	1–0	2-0
vs. Temple	0–2	0–2	1–1	1–1	1–1	0–1	0–2	—	0–1	1–1	0-2
vs. Tulane	1–0	2–0	1–1	2–0	1–1	2–0	1–1	1–0	—	2–0	2-0
vs. Tulsa	1–1	1–1	0–2	1–1	1–0	1–1	0–1	1–1	0–2	—	0-2
vs. UCF	1–0	2–0	0–2	2–0	2–0	1–0	0–2	2–0	0–2	2–0	—
Total	12–6	11–7	4–14	12–6	8–10	13–5	4–14	14–4	3–15	12–6	6–12

== Postseason ==
=== American Men's Basketball Championship ===
- March 10–13, 2016 at the Amway Center in Orlando, Florida

2016 American Men's Basketball Championship seeds and results
Seed	School	Conf.	Over.	Tiebreaker	First round March 10	Quarterfinals March 11	Semifinals March 12	Championship March 13
1.	Temple ‡ #	14-4	20-10		Bye	vs. #9 South Florida - W, 79-62	vs. #5 Connecticut - L, 62-77	
2.	Houston #	12-6	22-8	1-0 vs. MEM	Bye	vs. #10 Tulane - L, 69-72		
3.	Tulsa #	12-6	20-10	0-1 vs. MEM	Bye	vs. #6 Memphis - L, 67-89		
4.	Cincinnati #	12-6	22-9	0-2 vs. TEMP	Bye	vs. #5 Connecticut - L, 97-104 4OT		
5.	Connecticut #	11-7	21-10		Bye	vs. #4 Cincinnati - W, 104-97 4OT	vs. #1 Temple - W, 77-62	vs. #6 Memphis - W, 72-58
6.	Memphis #	8-10	17-14		Bye	vs. #3 Tulsa - W, 89-67	vs. #10 Tulane - W, 74-54	vs. #5 Connecticut - L, 58-72
7.	UCF	6-12	12-17		vs. #10 Tulane - L, 63-65			
8.	East Carolina	4-14	12-19	1-1 vs. TEMP	vs. #9 South Florida - L, 66-71			
9.	South Florida	4–14	7–24	0–2 vs. TEMP	vs. #8 East Carolina - W, 71-66	vs. #1 Temple - L, 62-79		
10.	Tulane	3–15	10–21		vs. #7 UCF - W, 65-63	vs. #2 Houston - W, 72-69	vs. #6 Memphis - L, 54-74	
‡ – American regular season champions, and tournament No. 1 seed. # – Received a bye in the conference tournament. Overall records include all games prior to the AAC tournament.

* SMU is banned from postseason play due to academic fraud and unethical conduct

=== NCAA tournament ===
Seed	Region	School	First Four	Round of 64	Round of 32	Sweet 16	Elite Eight	Final Four	Championship
9	South	Connecticut	Bye	vs. #8 Colorado - W, 74-67	vs. #1 Kansas - L, 61-73				
9	West	Cincinnati	Bye	vs. #8 St. Joseph's - L, 76-78					
10	South	Temple	Bye	vs. #7 Iowa - L, 70-72 OT					
11	East	Tulsa	vs. #11 Michigan - L, 62-67						
		W–L (%):	0–1 (.000)	1–2 (.333)	0–1 (.000)	0–0 (–)	0–0 (–)	0–0 (–)	0–0 (–) Total: 1–4 (.200)

=== National Invitation tournament ===
Seed	Bracket	School	First round	Second round	Quarterfinals	Semifinals	Finals
5	South Carolina	Houston	vs. #4 Georgia Tech - L, 62-81				
		W–L (%):	0–1 (.000)	0–0 (–)	0–0 (–)	0–0 (–)	0–0 (–) Total: 0–1 (.000)

== Honors and awards ==
=== All-AAC awards and teams ===
2016 American Men's Basketball Individual Awards
Award	Recipient(s)
Player of the Year	Nic Moore, G,SMU
Coach of the Year	Fran Dunphy,TEMP
Scholar-Athlete of the Year	Shaquille Harrison, G,TULSA
Rookie of the Year	Dedric Lawson, F,MEM
Defensive Player of the Year	Gary Clark, F, CIN
Most Improved Player	Prince Williams, G, ECU
Sixth Man Award	Markus Kennedy, F, SMU
Sportsmanship Award	Ruben Guerrero, C, USF

2016 American Athletic Conference All-Conference Teams|
First Team	Second Team	Honorable Mention	All-Rookie Team
Troy Caupain, G, CIN; Shaq Goodwin, F, MEM; Nic Moore^{†}, G, SMU; Quenton DeCosey^{†}, G, TEM; James Woodard, G, TULSA	Daniel Hamilton, G/F, CONN; Gary Clark, F, CIN; Devonta Pollard, F, HOU; Dedric Lawson, F, MEM; Shaquille Harrison, G, TULSA	Shonn Miller, F, CONN; Damyean Dotson, G, HOU	Kentrell Barkley, G/F, ECU; Dedric Lawson^{†}, F, MEM; Galen Robinson, G, HOU; Jahmal McMurray^{†}, G, USF; Shake Milton^{†}, G, SMU
^{†} denotes unanimous selection

== NBA draft ==
The following list includes all AAC players who were drafted in the 2016 NBA draft.

Player	Position	School	Round	Pick	Team
Daniel Hamilton	SG/SF	Connecticut	2	56	Denver Nuggets
