= 2015–16 Houston Cougars men's basketball team =

American college basketball season

2015–16 Houston Cougars men's basketball

NIT, First Round
- Conference: American Athletic Conference
- Record: 22–10 (12–6 AAC)
- Head coach: Kelvin Sampson (2nd season)
- Assistant coaches: Alvin Brooks; Talvin Hester; Kellen Sampson
- Home arena: Hofheinz Pavilion

2015–16 American Athletic Conference men's basketball standings
	Conf.				Overall
Team	W		L	PCT	W		L	PCT
Temple	14	–	4	.778	21	–	12	.636
No. 24 SMU^{*}	13	–	5	.722	25	–	5	.833
Houston	12	–	6	.667	22	–	10	.688
Cincinnati	12	–	6	.667	22	–	11	.667
Tulsa	12	–	6	.667	20	–	12	.625
UConn †	11	–	7	.611	25	–	11	.694
Memphis	8	–	10	.444	19	–	15	.559
UCF	6	–	12	.333	12	–	18	.400
East Carolina	4	–	14	.222	12	–	20	.375
South Florida	4	–	14	.222	8	–	25	.242
Tulane	3	–	15	.167	12	–	22	.353
^{*} Ineligible for postseason due to postseason ban † American Athletic Conference tournament Champions; Rankings from AP poll

The 2015–16 Houston Cougars men's basketball team represented the University of Houston during the 2015–16 NCAA Division I men's basketball season. The Cougars were led by second year head coach Kelvin Sampson and were members of the American Athletic Conference. The Cougars played their home games at Hofheinz Pavilion. They finished the season with a record of 22–11, 12–6 in AAC play to finish in a tie for third place in conference.

They lost in the quarterfinals of the AAC tournament to Tulane. They received a bid to the National Invitation Tournament where they lost to Georgia Tech in the first round.

== Previous season ==
The Cougars finished the 2014–15 season with a record of 13–19, 4–14 in AAC play to finish in tenth place in conference. They advanced to the quarterfinals of the AAC tournament where they lost to Tulsa.

== Departures ==
Name	Number	Pos.	Height	Weight	Year	Hometown	Notes
Mikhail McLean	1	F	6'6"	210	Senior	Nassau, Bahamas	Graduated
Cavon Baker	3	G	6'1"	175	Junior	Queens, NY	Transferred to St. Peter's
J. C. Washington	11	F	6'6"	225	Freshman	Houston, TX	Transferred to Trinity Valley Community College
Adam Drexler	20	F	6'5"	205	Junior	Houston, TX	Walk-on; didn't return
Jherrod Stiggers	21	G	6'4"	215	Junior	Terrell, TX	Play professionally overseas

=== Incoming transfers ===
Name	Number	Pos.	Height	Weight	Year	Hometown	Previous School
Xavier Dupree	1	F	6'9"	210	Junior	Houston, TX	Junior college transferred from Paris Junior College
Rob Gray	2	G	6'2"	190	Sophomore	Forest City, NC	Junior college transferred from Howard College
Damyean Dotson	21	G	6'6"		Junior	Houston, TX	Junior college transferred from Houston Community College
Kyle Meyer	33	C	6'10"	222	Junior	Alpharetta, GA	Junior college transferred from Eastern Florida State College

== Class of 2015 signees ==
College recruiting information
Name	Hometown	School	Height	Weight	Commit date
Chris Harris; C	Houston, TX	Madison High School	6 ft 9 in (2.06 m)	200 lb (91 kg)	Mar 13, 2015
Chris Harris; C	Recruit ratings: Scout: Rivals: (80)				
Galen Robinson; PG	Houston, TX	Westbury Christian School	6 ft 1 in (1.85 m)	N/A	Nov 20, 2014
Galen Robinson; PG	Recruit ratings: Scout: Rivals: (NR)				
Overall recruit ranking: Scout: NR Rivals: NR ESPN: NR
Note: In many cases, Scout, Rivals, 247Sports, On3, and ESPN may conflict in their listings of height and weight.; In these cases, the average was taken. ESPN grades are on a 100-point scale.; Sources: "Houston Basketball Commitment List". Rivals.; "2015 Houston Basketball Commitment List". Scout.; "ESPN". ESPN.; "Scout.com Team Recruiting Rankings". Scout.; "2015 Team Ranking". Rivals.

== Roster ==
2015–16 Houston Cougars men's basketball team
Players
Coaches

Pos.	#	Name	Height	Weight	Year	Hometown
F	0	Danrad Knowles	6 ft 10 in (2.08 m)	190 lb (86 kg)	RS Jr	Nassau, Bahamas
F	1	Xavier Dupree	6 ft 9 in (2.06 m)	210 lb (95 kg)	Jr	Houston, TX
G	2	Rob Gray	6 ft 2 in (1.88 m)	190 lb (86 kg)	So	Forest City, NC
G	3	Ronnie Johnson	6 ft 0 in (1.83 m)	180 lb (82 kg)	RS Jr	Indianapolis, IN
G	4	LeRon Barnes	6 ft 5 in (1.96 m)	195 lb (88 kg)	RS Sr	Stonewall, LA
G	5	L. J. Rose	6 ft 3 in (1.91 m)	200 lb (91 kg)	Sr	Houston, TX
G	12	Wes VanBeck (W)	6 ft 2 in (1.88 m)	180 lb (82 kg)	So	Houston, TX
F	13	Bertrand Nkali	6 ft 8 in (2.03 m)	225 lb (102 kg)	RS Jr	Bertoua, Cameroon
G	21	Damyean Dotson	6 ft 5 in (1.96 m)	210 lb (95 kg)	Jr	Houston, TX
G	23	Eric Weary Jr.	6 ft 4 in (1.93 m)	210 lb (95 kg)	Sr	New Orleans, LA
F	24	Devonta Pollard	6 ft 8 in (2.03 m)	200 lb (91 kg)	Sr	Porterville, MS
G	25	Galen Robinson Jr.	6 ft 0 in (1.83 m)	170 lb (77 kg)	Fr	Houston, TX
C	33	Kyle Meyer	6 ft 10 in (2.08 m)	225 lb (102 kg)	Jr	Atlanta, GA

Head coach

- Kelvin Sampson (UNC Pembroke)

Assistant coach(es)

- Alvin Brooks (Lamar)
- Talvin Hester (Texas Wesleyan)
- Kellen Sampson (Oklahoma)

Legend

- (C) Team captain
- (S) Suspended
- (I) Ineligible
- (W) Walk-on
- Injured
- Current redshirt

Roster

== Schedule and results ==
Date time, TV	Rank^{#}	Opponent^{#}	Result	Record	Site (attendance) city, state
Exhibition
11/13/2015*; 7:00 pm		Montana Tech	W 96–65		Hofheinz Pavilion; Houston, TX
Non-conference regular season
11/18/2015*; 7:00 pm, ESPN3		Prairie View A&M	W 110–59	1–0	Hofheinz Pavilion (1,223); Houston, TX
11/21/2015*; 7:00 pm, ESPN3		Florida A&M	W 97–52	2–0	Hofheinz Pavilion (3,163); Houston, TX
11/28/2015*; 7:00 pm, ESPN3		Louisiana–Monroe	W 76–64	3–0	Hofheinz Pavilion (2,332); Houston, TX
11/30/2015*; 7:00 pm, ESPN3		Texas–Rio Grande Valley	W 78–65	4–0	Hofheinz Pavilion (1,974); Houston, TX
12/02/2015*; 7:00 pm, ESPN3		Murray State	W 93–78	5–0	Hofheinz Pavilion (2,089); Houston, TX
12/08/2015*; 6:00 pm		at Rhode Island	L 57–67	5–1	Ryan Center (3,633); Kingston, RI
12/13/2015*; 7:00 pm, ESPN2		LSU	W 105–98 ^{OT}	6–1	Hofheinz Pavilion (7,918); Houston, TX
12/16/2015*; 7:00 pm, ESPN3		North Carolina Central; Global Basketball Classic	W 73–65	7–1	Hofheinz Pavilion (3,342); Houston, TX
12/19/2015*; 7:00 pm, ESPN3		Eastern Illinois; Global Basketball Classic	W 81–65	8–1	Hofheinz Pavilion (3,428); Houston, TX
12/21/2015*; 7:00 pm		vs. Grand Canyon; Global Basketball Classic semifinals	L 69–78	8–2	Cox Pavilion; Paradise, NV
12/22/2015*; 7:00 pm		at Wyoming; Global Basketball Classic 3rd place game	W 94–89 ^{OT}	9–2	Cox Pavilion; Paradise, NV
12/28/2015*; 1:00 pm, ESPN3		Nicholls State	W 76–49	10–2	Hofheinz Pavilion (3,403); Houston, TX
AAC regular season
12/30/2015; 1:00 pm, ESPNU		at South Florida	W 73–67	11–2 (1–0)	USF Sun Dome (2,754); Tampa, FL
01/02/2016; 11:00 am, ESPNews		at Temple	W 77–50	12–2 (2–0)	Liacouras Center (5,374); Philadelphia, PA
01/05/2016; 8:00 pm, ESPNU		Tulane	W 63–45	13–2 (3–0)	Hofheinz Pavilion (3,235); Houston, TX
01/13/2016; 6:00 pm, ESPNU		at Cincinnati	L 59–70	13–3 (3–1)	Fifth Third Arena (9,345); Cincinnati, OH
01/17/2016; 1:00 pm, CBSSN		UConn	L 57–69	13–4 (3–2)	Hofheinz Pavilion (4,672); Houston, TX
01/19/2016; 8:00 pm, ESPNU		at No. 8 SMU	L 73–77	13–5 (3–3)	Moody Coliseum (7,059); Dallas, TX
01/23/2016; 3:00 pm, CBSSN		South Florida	L 62–71	13–6 (3–4)	Hofheinz Pavilion (3,724); Houston, TX
01/27/2016; 7:00 pm, ESPNews		Tulsa	W 81–66	14–6 (4–4)	Hofheinz Pavilion (3,185); Houston, TX
01/30/2016; 11:00 am, ESPNews		at East Carolina	W 97–93 ^{2OT}	15–6 (5–4)	Williams Arena (5,212); Greenville, NC
02/01/2016; 7:00 pm, CBSSN		No. 12 SMU	W 71–68	16–6 (6–4)	Hofheinz Pavilion (6,195); Houston, TX
02/07/2016; 2:00 pm, ESPNU		at Tulsa	L 63–77	16–7 (6–5)	Reynolds Center (4,321); Tulsa, OK
02/10/2016; 6:00 pm, ESPNU		Memphis	W 98–90	17–7 (7–5)	Hofheinz Pavilion (4,060); Houston, TX
02/13/2016; 2:00 pm, ESPNews		UCF	W 82–58	18–7 (8–5)	Hofheinz Pavilion (4,126); Houston, TX
02/17/2016; 8:30 pm, ESPNews		at Tulane	W 82–69	19–7 (9–5)	Devlin Fieldhouse (1,593); New Orleans, LA
02/21/2016; 6:00 pm, ESPNews		Temple	L 66–69	19–8 (9–6)	Hofheinz Pavilion (4,466); Houston, TX
02/24/2016; 6:00 pm, ESPNU		at UCF	W 88–61	20–8 (10–6)	CFE Arena (4,664); Orlando, FL
02/28/2016; 12:00 pm, CBSSN		at UConn	W 75–68	21–8 (11–6)	Gampel Pavilion (9,667); Storrs, CT
03/03/2016; 8:00 pm, CBSSN		Cincinnati	W 69–56	22–8 (12–6)	Hofheinz Pavilion (4,171); Houston, TX
American Athletic Conference tournament
03/11/2016; 6:00 pm, ESPNU	(2)	vs. (10) Tulane; Quarterfinals	L 69–72	22–9	Amway Center; Orlando, FL
NIT
03/16/2016*; 7:00 pm, ESPN2	(5)	at (4) Georgia Tech; First round	L 62–81	22–10	Hank McCamish Pavilion; Atlanta, GA
*Non-conference game. ^{#}Rankings from AP Poll. (#) Tournament seedings in parentheses. All times are in Central Time.

== Rankings ==
Ranking movements Legend: RV = Received votes
	Week																				
Poll	Pre	1	2	3	4	5	6	7	8	9	10	11	12	13	14	15	16	17	18	19	Final
AP						RV															Not released
Coaches'									RV	RV											
