= 2015–16 South Florida Bulls men's basketball team =

American college basketball season

2015–16 South Florida Bulls men's basketball
- Conference: American Athletic Conference
- Record: 8–25 (4–14 AAC)
- Head coach: Orlando Antigua (2nd season)
- Assistant coach: Sergio Rouco; Rod Strickland; Oliver Antigua
- Home arena: USF Sun Dome

2015–16 American Athletic Conference men's basketball standings
	Conf.				Overall
Team	W		L	PCT	W		L	PCT
Temple	14	–	4	.778	21	–	12	.636
No. 24 SMU^{*}	13	–	5	.722	25	–	5	.833
Houston	12	–	6	.667	22	–	10	.688
Cincinnati	12	–	6	.667	22	–	11	.667
Tulsa	12	–	6	.667	20	–	12	.625
UConn †	11	–	7	.611	25	–	11	.694
Memphis	8	–	10	.444	19	–	15	.559
UCF	6	–	12	.333	12	–	18	.400
East Carolina	4	–	14	.222	12	–	20	.375
South Florida	4	–	14	.222	8	–	25	.242
Tulane	3	–	15	.167	12	–	22	.353
^{*} Ineligible for postseason due to postseason ban † American Athletic Conference tournament Champions; Rankings from AP poll

The 2015–16 South Florida Bulls men's basketball team represented the University of South Florida during the 2015–16 NCAA Division I men's basketball season. The season marked the 45th basketball season for USF and the third as a member of the American Athletic Conference. The Bulls were coached by Orlando Antigua, who was in his second season. The Bulls played their home games at the USF Sun Dome on the university's Tampa, Florida campus. The Bulls finished the season with a record of 8–25, 4–14 in AAC play to finish in a tie for ninth place in conference. They beat East Carolina in the first round of the AAC tournament before losing to Temple in the quarterfinals.

== Previous season ==
The Bulls finished the 2014–15 season with a record of 9–23, 3–15 in AAC play to finish in last place in conference. They lost in the first round of the AAC tournament to UConn.

== Departures ==
Name	Number	Pos.	Height	Weight	Year	Hometown	Notes
Dre Clayton	0	F	6'6"	245	RS Freshman	Orlando, FL	Transferred to NW Mississippi CC
Corey Allen, Jr.	4	G	6'1"	152	Senior	St. Louis, MO	Graduated
Anthony Collins	11	G	6'1"	175	Senior	Houston, TX	Graduated & transferred to Texas A&M
Dino Mercurius	30	G	6'4"	165	Freshman	Bronx, NY	Transferred to Texas–Rio Grande Valley

=== Incoming transfers ===
Name	Number	Pos.	Height	Weight	Year	Hometown	Previous School
Geno Thorpe	2	G	6'3"	180	Junior	Pittsburgh, PA	Transferred from Penn State. Under NCAA transfer rules, Thorpe will have to sit out for the 2015–16 season. Will have two years of remaining eligibility.
Angel Nunez	22	F	6'8"	202	Graduate Transfer	Bronx, NY	Transferred from Gonzaga. Under NCAA Transfer Rules, as a Graduate Transfer, Nunez is eligible to play for the 2015–16 season.
Shawn Smith		G	6'4"	185	Sophomore	Jacksonville, FL	Junior college transferred from Lee College

== Incoming recruits ==
College recruiting information
Name	Hometown	School	Height	Weight	Commit date
Tulio Da Silva; PF	Jacksonville, FL	Arlington Country Day School	6 ft 8 in (2.03 m)	200 lb (91 kg)	Oct 12, 2014
Tulio Da Silva; PF	Recruit ratings: Scout: Rivals: (80)				
Luis Santos; C	Bronx, NY	Sunrise Christian Academy	6 ft 9 in (2.06 m)	235 lb (107 kg)	Aug 5, 2014
Luis Santos; C	Recruit ratings: Scout: Rivals: (80)				
Jahmal McMurray; SG	Topeka, KS	Sunrise Christian Academy	5 ft 11 in (1.80 m)	170 lb (77 kg)	Oct 13, 2014
Jahmal McMurray; SG	Recruit ratings: Scout: Rivals: (NR)				
Overall recruit ranking:
Note: In many cases, Scout, Rivals, 247Sports, On3, and ESPN may conflict in their listings of height and weight.; In these cases, the average was taken. ESPN grades are on a 100-point scale.; Sources: "2015 Team Ranking". Rivals.

=== Recruiting Class of 2016 ===
College recruiting information (2016)
Name	Hometown	School	Height	Weight	Commit date
Troy Baxter Jr. SF	The Rock School	Gainesville, FL	6 ft 7 in (2.01 m)	185 lb (84 kg)	May 1, 2015
Troy Baxter Jr. SF	Recruit ratings: Scout: Rivals: (80)				
Overall recruit ranking:
Note: In many cases, Scout, Rivals, 247Sports, On3, and ESPN may conflict in their listings of height and weight.; In these cases, the average was taken. ESPN grades are on a 100-point scale.; Sources: "2016 Team Ranking". Rivals.

== Roster ==
2015–16 South Florida Bulls men's basketball team
Players
Coaches

Pos.	#	Name	Height	Weight	Year	Hometown
G	0	Jahmal McMurray	6 ft 0 in (1.83 m)	175 lb (79 kg)	Fr	Topeka, KS
F/C	1	Chris Perry	6 ft 8 in (2.03 m)	242 lb (110 kg)	Jr	Bartow, FL
G	2	Geno Thorpe (I) (redshirt)	6 ft 3 in (1.91 m)	180 lb (82 kg)	Jr	Pittsburgh, PA
G	3	Roddy Peters	6 ft 3 in (1.91 m)	192 lb (87 kg)	RS So	District Heights, MD
G	5	Nehemias Morillo	6 ft 5 in (1.96 m)	180 lb (82 kg)	Sr	Santiago, Dominican Republic
G	13	Jake Bodway (W)	6 ft 2 in (1.88 m)	185 lb (84 kg)	RS So	Minneapolis, MN
G	14	Justin David (W)	6 ft 2 in (1.88 m)	180 lb (82 kg)	RS So	Pittsburgh, PA
C	15	Jaleel Cousins	6 ft 10 in (2.08 m)	265 lb (120 kg)	Sr	Mobile, AL
F	21	Tulio Da Silva	6 ft 8 in (2.03 m)	200 lb (91 kg)	Fr	Formiga, Brazil
F	22	Angel Nunez	6 ft 8 in (2.03 m)	202 lb (92 kg)	Sr	Washington Heights, NY
G	25	Troy Holston, Jr.	6 ft 4 in (1.93 m)	200 lb (91 kg)	So	Queens, NY
C	33	Ruben Guerrero	6 ft 11 in (2.11 m)	225 lb (102 kg)	So	Málaga, Spain
F	35	Bo Zeigler	6 ft 6 in (1.98 m)	202 lb (92 kg)	RS So	Detroit, MI
F	42	Luis Santos	6 ft 8 in (2.03 m)	245 lb (111 kg)	Fr	Bronx, NY

Head coach

- Orlando Antigua

Assistant coach(es)

- Sergio Rouco
- Rod Strickland
- Oliver Antigua

Legend

- (C) Team captain
- (S) Suspended
- (I) Ineligible
- (W) Walk-on
- Injured
- Current redshirt

Roster

== Schedule and results ==
Date time, TV	Rank^{#}	Opponent^{#}	Result	Record	Site (attendance) city, state
Exhibition
11/09/2015*; 7:00 pm		Eckerd	W 78–64		USF Sun Dome (3,099); Tampa, FL
Non-conference regular season
11/13/2015*; 8:30 pm, ESPN3		Troy	L 77–82	0–1	USF Sun Dome (4,859); Tampa, FL
11/16/2015*; 7:00 pm, ESPN3		NJIT; Hoophall Miami Invitational	L 57–60	0–2	USF Sun Dome (2,672); Tampa, FL
11/19/2015*; 7:00 pm, ESPN3		George Washington	L 67–73	0–3	USF Sun Dome (2,790); Tampa, FL
11/21/2015*; 7:00 pm, ESPN3		Boston University; Hoophall Miami Invitational	L 66–78	0–4	USF Sun Dome (2,903); Tampa, FL
11/24/2015*; 7:00 pm, ESPN3		Albany; Hoophall Miami Invitational	W 63–61	1–4	USF Sun Dome (2,712); Tampa, FL
11/27/2015*; 5:00 pm, ESPN		vs. No. 1 Kentucky; Hoophall Miami Invitational	L 63–84	1–5	American Airlines Arena (10,023); Miami, FL
11/29/2015*; 7:00 pm, ESPN3		Savannah State	W 67–57	2–5	USF Sun Dome (2,429); Tampa, FL
12/03/2015*; 7:00 pm		at Delaware	L 58–67	2–6	Bob Carpenter Center (1,817); Newark, DE
12/05/2015*; 4:00 pm, SECN		at South Carolina	L 63–81	2–7	Colonial Life Arena (10,721); Columbia, SC
12/13/2015*; 4:00 pm, ESPNU		NC State	L 46–65	2–8	USF Sun Dome (2,945); Tampa, FL
12/16/2015*; 7:00 pm, ESPN3		Jacksonville	W 88–75	3–8	USF Sun Dome (2,628); Tampa, FL
12/19/2015*; 7:00 pm, ESPN3		UAB	L 68–79	3–9	USF Sun Dome (2,671); Tampa, FL
12/22/2015*; 6:30 pm, FS2		at Seton Hall	L 49–66	3–10	Prudential Center (5,700); Newark, NJ
Conference regular season
12/30/2015; 2:00 pm, ESPNU		Houston	L 67–73	3–11 (0–1)	USF Sun Dome (2,754); Tampa, FL
01/02/2016; 7:30 pm, ESPNews		at SMU	L 58–72	3–12 (0–2)	Moody Coliseum (6,852); Dallas, TX
01/06/2016; 7:00 pm, ESPNews		at UCF	L 64–75	3–13 (0–3)	CFE Arena (3,603); Orlando, FL
01/10/2016; 12:00 pm, ESPNU		Cincinnati	L 51–54	3–14 (0–4)	USF Sun Dome (3,062); Tampa, FL
01/12/2016; 7:00 pm, ESPNews		Tulane	L 70–81	3–15 (0–5)	USF Sun Dome (2,657); Tampa, FL
01/16/2016; 12:00 pm, CBSSN		at Memphis	L 56–71	3–16 (0–6)	FedEx Forum (11,681); Memphis, TN
01/20/2016; 6:15 pm, ESPNews		UCF	L 54–64	3–17 (0–7)	USF Sun Dome (3,491); Tampa, FL
01/23/2016; 4:00 pm, CBSSN		at Houston	W 71–62	4–17 (1–7)	Hofheinz Pavilion (3,724); Houston, TX
01/27/2016; 8:00 pm, ESPN3		at Tulane	W 73–60	5–17 (2–7)	Devlin Fieldhouse (2,429); New Orleans, LA
01/31/2016; 2:00 pm, CBSSN		Temple	L 63–70	5–18 (2–8)	USF Sun Dome (2,875); Tampa, FL
02/04/2016; 8:00 pm, CBSSN		at Cincinnati	L 57–88	5–19 (2–9)	Fifth Third Arena (9,116); Cincinnati, OH
02/07/2016; 2:00 pm, CBSSN		No. 12 SMU	L 58–92	5–20 (2–10)	USF Sun Dome (2,857); Tampa, FL
02/14/2016; 3:00 pm, CBSSN		at Temple	L 65–77	5–21 (2–11)	Liacouras Center (7,560); Philadelphia, PA
02/16/2016; 7:00 pm, ESPN3		at East Carolina	W 69–52	6–21 (3–11)	Williams Arena (4,299); Greenville, NC
02/20/2016; 11:00 am, ESPNU		Memphis	W 80–71	7–21 (4–11)	USF Sun Dome (3,840); Tampa, FL
02/25/2016; 7:30 pm, CBSSN		UConn	L 51–81	7–22 (4–12)	USF Sun Dome (4,668); Tampa, FL
03/02/2016; 9:00 pm, ESPNU		East Carolina	L 39–52	7–23 (4–13)	USF Sun Dome (2,957); Tampa, FL
03/05/2016; 5:00 pm, ESPNews		at Tulsa	L 74–84	7–24 (4–14)	Reynolds Center (6,524); Tulsa, OK
American Athletic Conference tournament
03/10/2016; 3:30 pm, ESPNU		vs. East Carolina; First Round	W 71–66	8–24	Amway Center; Orlando, FL
03/11/2016; 12:00 pm, ESPN2		vs. Temple; Quarterfinals	L 62–79	8–25	Amway Center; Orlando, FL
*Non-conference game. ^{#}Rankings from AP Poll. (#) Tournament seedings in parentheses. All times are in Eastern Time.
