= 2015–16 East Carolina Pirates men's basketball team =

American college basketball season

2015–16 East Carolina Pirates men's basketball
- Conference: American Athletic Conference
- Record: 12–20 (4–14 AAC)
- Head coach: Jeff Lebo (6th season)
- Assistant coaches: Mike Netti; Michael Perry; Ken Potosnak
- Home arena: Williams Arena

2015–16 American Athletic Conference men's basketball standings
	Conf.				Overall
Team	W		L	PCT	W		L	PCT
Temple	14	–	4	.778	21	–	12	.636
No. 24 SMU^{*}	13	–	5	.722	25	–	5	.833
Houston	12	–	6	.667	22	–	10	.688
Cincinnati	12	–	6	.667	22	–	11	.667
Tulsa	12	–	6	.667	20	–	12	.625
UConn †	11	–	7	.611	25	–	11	.694
Memphis	8	–	10	.444	19	–	15	.559
UCF	6	–	12	.333	12	–	18	.400
East Carolina	4	–	14	.222	12	–	20	.375
South Florida	4	–	14	.222	8	–	25	.242
Tulane	3	–	15	.167	12	–	22	.353
^{*} Ineligible for postseason due to postseason ban † American Athletic Conference tournament Champions; Rankings from AP poll

The 2015–16 East Carolina Pirates men's basketball team represented East Carolina University during the 2015–16 NCAA Division I men's basketball season. The Pirates were led by sixth year head coach Jeff Lebo and played their home games at Williams Arena at Minges Coliseum as second year members of the American Athletic Conference. The Pirates finished the season with a record of 12–20, 4–14 in AAC play to finish in a tie for ninth place in conference.

They lost to South Florida in the first round of the AAC tournament.

== Previous season ==
The Pirates finished the 2014–15 season with a record of 14–19, 6–12 in AAC play to finish in a tie for seventh place in conference. They advanced to the quarterfinals of the AAC tournament where they lost to SMU.

== Departures ==
Name	Number	Pos.	Height	Weight	Year	Hometown	Notes
Terry Whisnant	0	G	6'3"	180	RS Junior	Cherryville, NC	Signed to professional team
Francis Edosomwan	10	G	6'3"	220	Senior	Charlotte, NC	Graduated
Antonio Robinson	11	G	6'4"	175	Senior	Winston-Salem, NC	Graduated
Paris Roberts-Campbell	22	G	6'3"	185	Senior	Charlotte, NC	Graduated
Keith Armstrong	24	F	6'7"	240	Junior	Raleigh, NC	Transferred to Winston-Salem State
Greg Alexander	31	G	6'4"	200	Sophomore	Hampton, VA	Transferred to Mount St. Mary's

=== Incoming transfers ===
Name	Number	Pos.	Height	Weight	Year	Hometown	Previous School
Charles Foster	3	G	6'2"	175	Junior	Louisville, KY	Vincennes University
Clarence Williams	10	F	6'8"	200	Junior	Decatur, GA	Trinity Valley CC

== Incoming recruits ==
College recruiting information
Name	Hometown	School	Height	Weight	Commit date
Deng Riak; C	Bradenton, FL	Victory Rock Prep	6 ft 10 in (2.08 m)	215 lb (98 kg)	Mar 14, 2015
Deng Riak; C	Recruit ratings: Scout: Rivals: (80)				
Kentrell Barkley; SF	Durham, NC	Northern High School	6 ft 5 in (1.96 m)	195 lb (88 kg)	Sep 1, 2014
Kentrell Barkley; SF	Recruit ratings: Scout: Rivals: (NR)				
Overall recruit ranking:
Note: In many cases, Scout, Rivals, 247Sports, On3, and ESPN may conflict in their listings of height and weight.; In these cases, the average was taken. ESPN grades are on a 100-point scale.; Sources: "2015 Team Ranking". Rivals.

== Roster ==
2015–16 East Carolina Pirates men's basketball team
Players
Coaches

Pos.	#	Name	Height	Weight	Year	Previous school	Hometown
C	0	Deng Riak	6 ft 10 in (2.08 m)	225 lb (102 kg)	Fr	Victory Rock Prep	Melbourne, Australia
F	1	Grant Bryant	6 ft 7 in (2.01 m)	200 lb (91 kg)	So	Kell	Kennesaw, GA
G	2	Caleb White	6 ft 7 in (2.01 m)	205 lb (93 kg)	Jr	Virginia Episcopal	Buckingham, VA
G	3	Charles Foster	6 ft 0 in (1.83 m)	160 lb (73 kg)	Jr	Vincennes	Louisville, KY
G	4	Prince Williams (W)	6 ft 5 in (1.96 m)	200 lb (91 kg)	Sr	Broughton	Raleigh, NC
G	5	Lance Tejada	6 ft 2 in (1.88 m)	190 lb (86 kg)	So	Blanche Ely	Pompano Beach, FL
F	10	Clarence Williams	6 ft 8 in (2.03 m)	195 lb (88 kg)	Jr	Trinity Valley CC	Tallahassee, FL
F	13	Michel Nzege	6 ft 8 in (2.03 m)	220 lb (100 kg)	RS Jr	Winston-Salem State	Geneva, Switzerland
G/F	15	Kentrell Barkley	6 ft 5 in (1.96 m)	205 lb (93 kg)	Fr	Northern Durham	Durham, NC
G	21	B. J. Tyson	6 ft 3 in (1.91 m)	180 lb (82 kg)	So	Anson	Wadesboro, NC
G	24	Drew Bost (W)	5 ft 10 in (1.78 m)	175 lb (79 kg)	Sr	Wake Tech CC	Raleigh, NC
G	31	Peyton Robbins (W)	6 ft 3 in (1.91 m)	210 lb (95 kg)	Sr	St. David's	Raleigh, NC
G	32	Justice Obasohan (W)	6 ft 5 in (1.96 m)	210 lb (95 kg)	Fr	NC School of Science and Math	Wallace, NC
F	34	Michael Zangari	6 ft 9 in (2.06 m)	240 lb (109 kg)	Sr	Red Land	Etters, PA
F	41	Marshall Guimette	6 ft 10 in (2.08 m)	250 lb (113 kg)	RS Jr	Harrison	Kennesaw, GA
F	44	Kanu Aja	6 ft 9 in (2.06 m)	255 lb (116 kg)	Sr	City College of San Francisco	Baltimore, MD

Head coach

- Jeff Lebo (North Carolina)

Assistant coach(es)

- Mike Netti (Syracuse)
- Michael Perry (Richmond)
- Ken Potosnak (Randolph–Macon)

Legend

- (C) Team captain
- (S) Suspended
- (I) Ineligible
- (W) Walk-on
- Injured
- Current redshirt

Roster

== Schedule ==
Date time, TV	Rank^{#}	Opponent^{#}	Result	Record	Site (attendance) city, state
Non-conference regular season
11/13/2015*; 8:00 pm, ESPN3		Grambling State	W 61–53	1–0	Williams Arena (5,083); Greenville, NC
11/16/2015*; 7:00 pm, ESPN3		Charlotte	W 88–74	2–0	Williams Arena (4,276); Greenville, NC
11/20/2015*; 11:00 pm, P12N		at No. 15 California; Las Vegas Invitational	L 62–70	2–1	Haas Pavilion (8,658); Berkeley, CA
11/23/2015*; 10:00 pm, ESPN3		at San Diego State; Las Vegas Invitational	L 54–79	2–2	Viejas Arena (12,414); San Diego, CA
11/26/2015*; 2:00 pm		vs. Arkansas–Little Rock; Las Vegas Invitational semifinals	L 46–54	2–3	Orleans Arena (N/A); Paradise, NV
11/27/2015*; 5:00 pm		vs. Stetson; Las Vegas Invitational 3rd place game	W 93–73	3–3	Orleans Arena (N/A); Paradise, NV
12/01/2015*; 7:00 pm, ESPN3		Florida Atlantic	W 74–48	4–3	Williams Arena (3,763); Greenville, NC
12/04/2015*; 7:00 pm, ESPN3		USC Upstate	W 82–71	5–3	Williams Arena (4,464); Greenville, NC
12/07/2015*; 7:00 pm		at College of Charleston	L 73–77	5–4	TD Arena (2,357); Charleston, SC
12/13/2015*; 2:00 pm, ESPN3		North Carolina A&T	W 71–60	6–4	Williams Arena (4,151); Greenville, NC
12/16/2015*; 7:00 pm, ESPN3		UNC Wilmington	W 78–73	7–4	Williams Arena (4,038); Greenville, NC
12/20/2015*; 2:00 pm		at James Madison	L 61–67	7–5	JMU Convocation Center (2,510); Harrisonburg, VA
12/22/2015*; 7:00 pm, ESPN3		South Carolina State	W 98–71	8–5	Williams Arena (4,145); Greenville, NC
AAC regular season
01/02/2016; 6:00 pm, ESPN3		UCF	L 68–71	8–6 (0–1)	Williams Arena (4,605); Greenville, NC
01/05/2016; 7:00 pm, ESPNews		at Tulsa	L 43–55	8–7 (0–2)	Reynolds Center (4,244); Tulsa, OK
01/09/2016; 9:00 pm, ESPNews		at Temple	L 60–78	8–8 (0–3)	Liacouras Center (4,524); Philadelphia, PA
01/13/2016; 6:15 pm, ESPNews		No. 10 SMU	L 55–79	8–9 (0–4)	Williams Arena (6,022); Greenville, NC
01/16/2016; 4:30 pm, ESPNews		at UCF	L 69–89	8–10 (0–5)	CFE Arena (5,411); Orlando, FL
01/19/2016; 7:00 pm, ESPNews		Tulsa	L 69–84	8–11 (0–6)	Williams Arena (3,878); Greenville, NC
01/24/2016; 2:00 pm, CBSSN		at Memphis	W 84–83	9–11 (1–6)	FedEx Forum (11,165); Memphis, TN
01/27/2016; 7:00 pm, ESPN3		Temple	W 64–61	10–11 (2–6)	Williams Arena (4,196); Greenville, NC
01/30/2016; 12:00 pm, ESPNews		Houston	L 93–97 ^{2OT}	10–12 (2–7)	Williams Arena (5,212); Greenville, NC
02/07/2016; 12:00 pm, CBSSN		at UConn	L 67–85	10–13 (2–8)	Gampel Pavilion (9,307); Storrs, CT
02/10/2016; 6:15 pm, ESPNews		Tulane	L 92–100 ^{3OT}	10–14 (2–9)	Williams Arena (3,656); Greenville, NC
02/13/2016; 4:00 pm, ESPNU		at Cincinnati	L 60–75	10–15 (2–10)	Fifth Third Arena; Cincinnati, OH
02/16/2016; 7:00 pm, ESPN3		South Florida	L 52–69	10–16 (2–11)	Williams Arena; Greenville, NC
02/21/2016; 2:00 pm, ESPNews		at No. 21 SMU	L 63–74	10–17 (2–12)	Moody Coliseum (6,852); Dallas, TX
02/24/2016; 8:00 pm, ESPNews		at Tulane	W 79–73	11–17 (3–12)	Devlin Fieldhouse (1,638); New Orleans, LA
02/27/2016; 12:00 pm, ESPNU		Cincinnati	L 56–65	11–18 (3–13)	Williams Arena (4,841); Greenville, NC
03/02/2016; 9:00 pm, ESPNU		at South Florida	W 52–39	12–18 (4–13)	USF Sun Dome (2,957); Tampa, FL
03/06/2016; 4:00 pm, CBSSN		Memphis	L 53–83	12–19 (4–14)	Williams Arena (4,487); Greenville, NC
American Athletic Conference tournament
03/10/2016; ESPNU		vs. South Florida; First Round	L 66–71	12–20	Amway Center; Orlando, FL
*Non-conference game. ^{#}Rankings from AP Poll. (#) Tournament seedings in parentheses. All times are in Eastern Time.
