= 2015–16 UConn Huskies men's basketball team =

American college basketball season

2015–16 UConn Huskies men's basketball

American Athletic tournament champions

NCAA tournament, Second Round
- Conference: American Athletic Conference
- Record: 25–11 (11–7 The American)
- Head coach: Kevin Ollie (4th season)
- Assistant coaches: Glen Miller; Karl Hobbs; Ricky Moore
- Home arena: Harry A. Gampel Pavilion; XL Center

2015–16 American Athletic Conference men's basketball standings
	Conf.				Overall
Team	W		L	PCT	W		L	PCT
Temple	14	–	4	.778	21	–	12	.636
No. 24 SMU^{*}	13	–	5	.722	25	–	5	.833
Houston	12	–	6	.667	22	–	10	.688
Cincinnati	12	–	6	.667	22	–	11	.667
Tulsa	12	–	6	.667	20	–	12	.625
UConn †	11	–	7	.611	25	–	11	.694
Memphis	8	–	10	.444	19	–	15	.559
UCF	6	–	12	.333	12	–	18	.400
East Carolina	4	–	14	.222	12	–	20	.375
South Florida	4	–	14	.222	8	–	25	.242
Tulane	3	–	15	.167	12	–	22	.353
^{*} Ineligible for postseason due to postseason ban † American Athletic Conference tournament Champions; Rankings from AP poll

The 2015–16 UConn Huskies men's basketball team represented the University of Connecticut in the 2015–16 NCAA Division I men's basketball season. The Huskies were led by fourth-year head coach Kevin Ollie. The Huskies split their home games between the XL Center in Hartford, Connecticut, and the Harry A. Gampel Pavilion on the UConn campus in Storrs, Connecticut. The Huskies were members of the American Athletic Conference. They finished the season 25–11, 11–7 in American Athletic play to finish in sixth place.

UConn defeated Cincinnati, Temple, and Memphis to be champions of the American Athletic tournament. They received an automatic bid to the NCAA tournament where they defeated Colorado in the Round of 64 before losing to Kansas in the Round of 32.

== Previous season ==
The Huskies finished the season 20–15, 10–8 in AAC play to finish in a tie for fifth place. They advanced to the championship game of the American Athletic tournament where they lost to SMU.

UConn was invited to the National Invitation Tournament where they lost in the first round to Arizona State 68–61.

== Departures ==
Name	Number	Pos.	Height	Weight	Year	Hometown	Notes
Terrence Samuel	3	G	6'4"	202	Sophomore	Brooklyn, NY	Transferred to Penn State
Ryan Boatright	11	G	6'0"	175	Senior	Aurora, IL	Graduated/Went undrafted in 2015 NBA draft
Rakim Lubin	14	F	6'8"	260	Freshman	Miami, FL	Transferred to Cal State Northridge
Pat Lenehan	22	G	6'3"	190	Senior	Cheshire, CT	Graduated
Dan Guest	24	G	6'2"	214	Senior	West Hartford, CT	Graduated
Terrance Ditimi	33	F	6'2"	209	Senior	Stamford, CT	Graduated

== Incoming transfers ==
Name	Number	Pos.	Height	Weight	Year	Hometown	Notes
Sterling Gibbs	4	G	6'2"	185	Graduate Student	Scotch Plains, NJ	Transferred from Seton Hall. Under NCAA transfer rules, Gibbs will be eligible to start at the beginning the 2015–16 season. Gibbs has one year of remaining eligibility.
Terry Larrier	22	G/F	6'8"	185	RS Freshman	Bronx, NY	Transferred from VCU. Under NCAA transfer rules, Larrier will sit out for one year and be eligible to start at the beginning the 2016–17 season. Larrier will have three years of remaining eligibility.
Shonn Miller	32	F	6'7"	210	Graduate Student	Euclid, OH	Transferred from Cornell. Under NCAA transfer rules, Miller will be eligible to start at the beginning the 2015–16 season. Miller has one year of remaining eligibility.

== Recruits ==
College recruiting
Name	Hometown	School	Height	Weight	Commit date
Jalen Adams; PG	Roxbury, MA	Brewster Academy	6 ft 2 in (1.88 m)	160 lb (73 kg)	Jun 30, 2014
Jalen Adams; PG	Recruit ratings: Scout: Rivals: ESPN: (89)				
Steven Enoch; C	Norwalk, CT	St. Thomas More School	6 ft 10 in (2.08 m)	220 lb (100 kg)	Sep 13, 2014
Steven Enoch; C	Recruit ratings: Scout: Rivals: ESPN: (81)				
Overall recruit ranking:
Note: In many cases, Scout, Rivals, 247Sports, On3, and ESPN may conflict in their listings of height and weight.; In these cases, the average was taken. ESPN grades are on a 100-point scale.; Sources: "2015 Connecticut Basketball Commitment List". Rivals.; "2015 Connecticut Basketball Recruiting Prospects". Scout.; "2015 Connecticut Recruits". ESPN.; "Scout.com Team Recruiting Rankings". Scout.; "2015 Team Ranking". Rivals.

== Roster ==
2015–16 UConn Huskies men's basketball team
Players
Coaches

Pos.	#	Name	Height	Weight	Year	Previous school	Hometown
PF	0	Phillip Nolan	6 ft 10 in (2.08 m)	237 lb (108 kg)	Sr	Riverside University	Milwaukee, WI
PG	2	Jalen Adams	6 ft 2 in (1.88 m)	170 lb (77 kg)	Fr	Brewster Academy	Roxbury, MA
PG	4	Sterling Gibbs	6 ft 2 in (1.88 m)	185 lb (84 kg)	GS	Seton Hall University	Scotch Plains, NJ
SF	5	Daniel Hamilton	6 ft 7 in (2.01 m)	190 lb (86 kg)	So	St. John Bosco	Los Angeles, CA
PG	10	Sam Cassell Jr.	6 ft 4 in (1.93 m)	192 lb (87 kg)	RS Jr	Chipola College	Baltimore, MD
PF	12	Kentan Facey	6 ft 9 in (2.06 m)	206 lb (93 kg)	Jr	Long Island (NY) Lutheran	Trelawny, Jamaica
C	13	Steven Enoch	6 ft 10 in (2.08 m)	245 lb (111 kg)	Fr	St. Thomas More	Norwalk, CT
SG	21	Omar Calhoun	6 ft 5 in (1.96 m)	205 lb (93 kg)	Sr	Christ the King	Brooklyn, NY
SF	22	Terry Larrier (I) (redshirt)	6 ft 8 in (2.03 m)	185 lb (84 kg)	RS Fr	Virginia Commonwealth University	Bronx, NY
PF	23	Nnamdi Amilo	6 ft 3 in (1.91 m)	225 lb (102 kg)	Sr	Avon Old Farms	New Fairfield, CT
PF	24	Christian Foxen (W)	6 ft 8 in (2.03 m)	223 lb (101 kg)	So	South Kent Prep	Rocky Hill, CT
SG	31	Michael Noyes (W)	5 ft 11 in (1.8 m)	185 lb (84 kg)	Jr	Granby Memorial	Granby, CT
PF	32	Shonn Miller	6 ft 7 in (2.01 m)	210 lb (95 kg)	GS	Cornell University	Euclid, OH
C	35	Amida Brimah	7 ft 0 in (2.13 m)	230 lb (104 kg)	Jr	Archbishop Coleman F. Carroll	Accra, Ghana
SG	44	Rodney Purvis	6 ft 4 in (1.93 m)	205 lb (93 kg)	RS Jr	Upper Room Christian Academy	Raleigh, NC

Head coach

- Kevin Ollie

Assistant coach(es)

- Karl Hobbs
- Glen Miller
- Ricky Moore

Legend

- (C) Team captain
- (S) Suspended
- (I) Ineligible
- (W) Walk-on
- Injured
- Current redshirt

Roster
Last update: 3/19/16

== Schedule ==
Date time, TV	Rank^{#}	Opponent^{#}	Result	Record	High points	High rebounds	High assists	Site (attendance) city, state
Exhibition
11/01/2015*; 2:00 pm, HuskyVision	No. 20	Tampa	W 88–72	–	18 – Miller	8 – Hamilton	5 – Gibbs	Gampel Pavilion (7,153); Storrs, CT
11/07/2015*; 1:00 pm, HuskyVision	No. 20	New Haven	W 83–43	–	11 – Tied	7 – Brimah	4 – Tied	XL Center (7,518); Hartford, CT
Regular season
11/13/2015*; 7:30 pm, SNY	No. 20	Maine	W 100–56	1–0	20 – Gibbs	10 – Miller	9 – Hamilton	Gampel Pavilion (10,167); Storrs, CT
11/17/2015*; 7:00 pm, SNY	No. 19	New Hampshire	W 85–66	2–0	21 – Gibbs	11 – Hamilton	6 – Hamilton	Gampel Pavilion (9,047); Storrs, CT
11/21/2015*; 12:00 pm, SNY	No. 19	Furman; Battle 4 Atlantis Mainland	W 83–58	3–0	18 – Miller	7 – Miller	7 – Purvis	Gampel Pavilion (8,190); Storrs, CT
11/25/2015*; 9:30 pm, AXS TV	No. 18	vs. Michigan; Battle 4 Atlantis Quarterfinals	W 74–60	4–0	16 – Hamilton	9 – Hamilton	9 – Hamilton	Imperial Arena (2,491); Nassau, Bahamas
11/26/2015*; 3:30 pm, ESPN	No. 18	vs. Syracuse; Battle 4 Atlantis Semifinals/Rivalry	L 76–79	4–1	18 – Hamilton	12 – Hamilton	7 – Hamilton	Imperial Arena (3,009); Nassau, Bahamas
11/27/2015*; 12:30 pm, ESPN	No. 18	vs. No. 10 Gonzaga; Battle 4 Atlantis Third-place game	L 70–73	4–2	19 – Miller	7 – Hamilton	2 – 4 tied	Imperial Arena (2,122); Nassau, Bahamas
12/02/2015*; 7:00 pm, SNY		Sacred Heart	W 82–49	5–2	19 – Purvis	13 – Hamilton	7 – Hamilton	XL Center (8,563); Hartford, CT
12/08/2015*; 9:00 pm, ESPN		vs. No. 6 Maryland; Jimmy V Classic	L 66–76	5–3	23 – Hamilton	7 – Brimah	2 – 3 tied	Madison Square Garden (19,812); New York City, NY
12/12/2015*; 12:00 pm, CBS		Ohio State	W 75–55	6–3	14 – Calhoun	9 – Miller	5 – Tied	Gampel Pavilion (10,167); Storrs, CT
12/20/2015*; 4:00 pm, SNY	No. 25	UMass Lowell	W 88–79	7–3	28 – Purvis	11 – Hamilton	7 – Hamilton	XL Center (9,848); Hartford, CT
12/23/2015*; 12:30 pm, ESPNU		Central Connecticut	W 99–52	8–3	25 – Miller	12 – Facey	11 – Hamilton	XL Center (7,123); Hartford, CT
12/29/2015*; 9:00 pm, ESPN2		at Texas	W 71–66	9–3	16 – Purvis	8 – Facey	4 – Gibbs	Frank Erwin Center (13,931); Austin, TX
01/02/2016; 7:30 pm, CBSSN		at Tulane	W 75–67	10–3 (1–0)	20 – Purvis	9 – Hamilton	7 – Gibbs	Devlin Fieldhouse (2,243); New Orleans, LA
01/05/2016; 8:00 pm, CBSSN	No. 23	Temple	L 53–55	10–4 (1–1)	18 – Miller	9 – Hamilton	2 – Tied	XL Center (11,319); Hartford, CT
01/09/2016; 7:00 pm, ESPN2	No. 23	Memphis	W 81–78	11–4 (2–1)	26 – Gibbs	8 – Hamilton	4 – Hamilton	Gampel Pavilion (9,409); Storrs, CT
01/14/2016; 7:00 pm, ESPN2		at Tulsa	L 51–60	11–5 (2–2)	20 – Gibbs	14 – Hamilton	5 – Hamilton	Reynolds Center (5,192); Tulsa, OK
01/17/2016; 2:00 pm, CBSSN		at Houston	W 69–57	12–5 (3–2)	20 – Gibbs	9 – Hamilton	3 – 3 tied	Hofheinz Pavilion (4,672); Houston, TX
01/19/2016; 7:00 pm, CBSSN		Tulane	W 60–42	13–5 (4–2)	18 – Miller	7 – Tied	3 – Hamilton	XL Center (9,516); Hartford, CT
01/23/2016*; 12:00 pm, CBS		Georgetown; Rivalry	W 68–62	14–5	17 – Purvis	8 – Hamilton	3 – Hamilton	XL Center (15,564); Hartford, CT
01/28/2016; 7:00 pm, ESPNU		Cincinnati	L 57–58	14–6 (4–3)	14 – Gibbs	8 – Tied	8 – Hamilton	XL Center (13,242); Hartford, CT
01/31/2016; 4:00 pm, CBSSN		at UCF	W 67–41	15–6 (5–3)	11 – Miller	8 – Miller	5 – Adams	CFE Arena (6,414); Orlando, FL
02/04/2016; 9:00 pm, ESPN2		at Memphis	W 77–57	16–6 (6–3)	16 – Hamilton	13 – Hamilton	8 – Hamilton	FedEx Forum (13,323); Memphis, TN
02/07/2016; 12:00 pm, CBSSN		East Carolina	W 85–67	17–6 (7–3)	16 – Tied	16 – Hamilton	5 – Hamilton	Gampel Pavilion (9,307); Storrs, CT
02/11/2016; 7:00 pm, ESPN2		at Temple	L 58–63	17–7 (7–4)	15 – Miller	10 – Hamilton	6 – Hamilton	Liacouras Center (8,316); Philadelphia, PA
02/13/2016; 8:00 pm, ESPN2		Tulsa	W 75–73	18–7 (8–4)	14 – Tied	10 – Hamilton	5 – Tied	Gampel Pavilion (10,167); Storrs, CT
02/18/2016; 8:00 pm, ESPN2		No. 21 SMU	W 68–62	19–7 (9–4)	16 – Brimah	8 – Brimah	4 – Hamilton	XL Center (15,564); Hartford, CT
02/20/2016; 4:00 pm, ESPN2		at Cincinnati	L 60–65	19–8 (9–5)	19 – Adams	8 – Hamilton	5 – Hamilton	Fifth Third Arena (13,176); Cincinnati, OH
02/25/2016; 7:30 pm, CBSSN		at South Florida	W 81–51	20–8 (10–5)	18 – Purvis	8 – Hamilton	9 – Hamilton	USF Sun Dome (4,668); Tampa, FL
02/28/2016; 1:00 pm, CBSSN		Houston	L 68–75	20–9 (10–6)	20 – Hamilton	7 – Tied	6 – Adams	Gampel Pavilion (9,667); Storrs, CT
03/03/2016; 9:00 pm, ESPN2		at No. 24 SMU	L 54–80	20–10 (10–7)	20 – Gibbs	5 – Hamilton	2 – 4 tied	Moody Coliseum (7,303); Dallas, TX
03/06/2016; 2:00 pm, ESPNU		UCF	W 67–46	21–10 (11–7)	12 – Hamilton	7 – Tied	5 – Purvis	Gampel Pavilion (10,167); Storrs, CT
AAC Tournament
03/11/2016; 2:00 pm, ESPN2	(5)	vs. (4) Cincinnati; Quarterfinals	W 104–97 ^{4OT}	22–10	32 – Hamilton	12 – Hamilton	8 – Hamilton	Amway Center (7,475); Orlando, FL
03/12/2016; 3:00 pm, ESPN2	(5)	vs. (1) Temple; Semifinals	W 77–62	23–10	19 – Tied	11 – Hamilton	8 – Adams	Amway Center (7,465); Orlando, FL
03/13/2016; 3:15 pm, ESPN	(5)	vs. (6) Memphis; Championship	W 72–58	24–10	13 – Tied	11 – Hamilton	6 – Hamilton	Amway Center (7,990); Orlando, FL
NCAA tournament
03/17/2016*; 1:30 pm, TNT	(9 S)	vs. (8 S) Colorado; First Round	W 74–67	25–10	19 – Purvis	10 – Hamilton	3 – Adams	Wells Fargo Arena (16,628); Des Moines, IA
03/19/2016*; 7:45 pm, CBS	(9 S)	vs. (1 S) No. 1 Kansas; Second Round	L 61–73	25–11	20 – Gibbs	8 – Hamilton	6 – Hamilton	Wells Fargo Arena (16,824); Des Moines, IA
*Non-conference game. ^{#}Rankings from AP Poll. (#) Tournament seedings in parentheses. S=South. All times are in Eastern Time.

== Rankings ==
Ranking movements Legend: ██ Increase in ranking ██ Decrease in ranking — = Not ranked RV = Received votes т = Tied with team above or below
	Week																			
Poll	Pre	2	3	4	5	6	7	8	9	10	11	12	13	14	15	16	17	18	19	Final
AP	20	19	18	RV	RV	25	RV	RV	23	—	—	RV	—	RV	—	RV	—	—	RV	N/A
Coaches	т24	24	21	RV	RV	RV	RV	RV	24	RV	RV	RV	—	—	—	—	—	—	RV	RV
