= 2015–16 Memphis Tigers men's basketball team =

American college basketball season

2015–16 Memphis Tigers men's basketball
- Conference: American Athletic Conference
- Record: 19–15 (8–10 The American)
- Head coach: Josh Pastner (7th season)
- Assistant coaches: Robert Kirby; Keelon Lawson; Damon Stoudamire
- Home arena: FedExForum

2015–16 American Athletic Conference men's basketball standings
	Conf.				Overall
Team	W		L	PCT	W		L	PCT
Temple	14	–	4	.778	21	–	12	.636
No. 24 SMU^{*}	13	–	5	.722	25	–	5	.833
Houston	12	–	6	.667	22	–	10	.688
Cincinnati	12	–	6	.667	22	–	11	.667
Tulsa	12	–	6	.667	20	–	12	.625
UConn †	11	–	7	.611	25	–	11	.694
Memphis	8	–	10	.444	19	–	15	.559
UCF	6	–	12	.333	12	–	18	.400
East Carolina	4	–	14	.222	12	–	20	.375
South Florida	4	–	14	.222	8	–	25	.242
Tulane	3	–	15	.167	12	–	22	.353
^{*} Ineligible for postseason due to postseason ban † American Athletic Conference tournament Champions; Rankings from AP poll

The 2015–16 Memphis Tigers men's basketball team represented the University of Memphis in the 2015–16 NCAA Division I men's basketball season, the 95th season of Tiger basketball. The Tigers, led by seventh year head coach Josh Pastner, played their home games at the FedExForum. The season marked the third season the Tigers have participated in the American Athletic Conference. The Tigers finished with a record of 19–15, 8–10 in AAC play to finish in seventh place in conference. The Tigers defeated Tulsa and Tulane in the AAC tournament before losing to UConn in the championship. For the second consecutive year, the Tigers did not participate in a postseason tournament.

== Previous season ==
The Tigers finished the 2014–15 season with a record of 18–14 and 10–8 in AAC play to finish in a tie for fifth place in conference. The Tigers lost in the quarterfinals of the AAC tournament to Temple. The Tigers did not participate in a postseason tournament, marking the first time in 15 years that the Tigers had missed the postseason entirely.

== Off-season ==
=== Departures ===
Name	Pos.	Height	Weight	Year	Hometown	Notes
Chris Hawkins	F	6' 5"	240	Junior	Memphis, TN	Medical concerns
Calvin Godfrey	F	6' 8"	233	Senior	Milwaukee, WI	Graduated
Kuran Iverson	F	6' 9"	205	Sophomore	Windsor, CT	Dismissed, transferred to Rhode Island
Nick King	F	6' 7"	226	Sophomore	Memphis, TN	Transferred to Alabama
Austin Nichols	F	6' 8"	228	Sophomore	Eads, TN	Transferred to Virginia
Pookie Powell	G	6' 1"	180	Sophomore	Orlando, FL	Transferred to La Salle

=== Transfers ===
Name	Pos.	Height	Weight	Year	Hometown	Notes
Ricky Tarrant	G	6' 2"	190	Senior	Pleasant Grove, AL	Transfer from Alabama

=== Recruiting ===
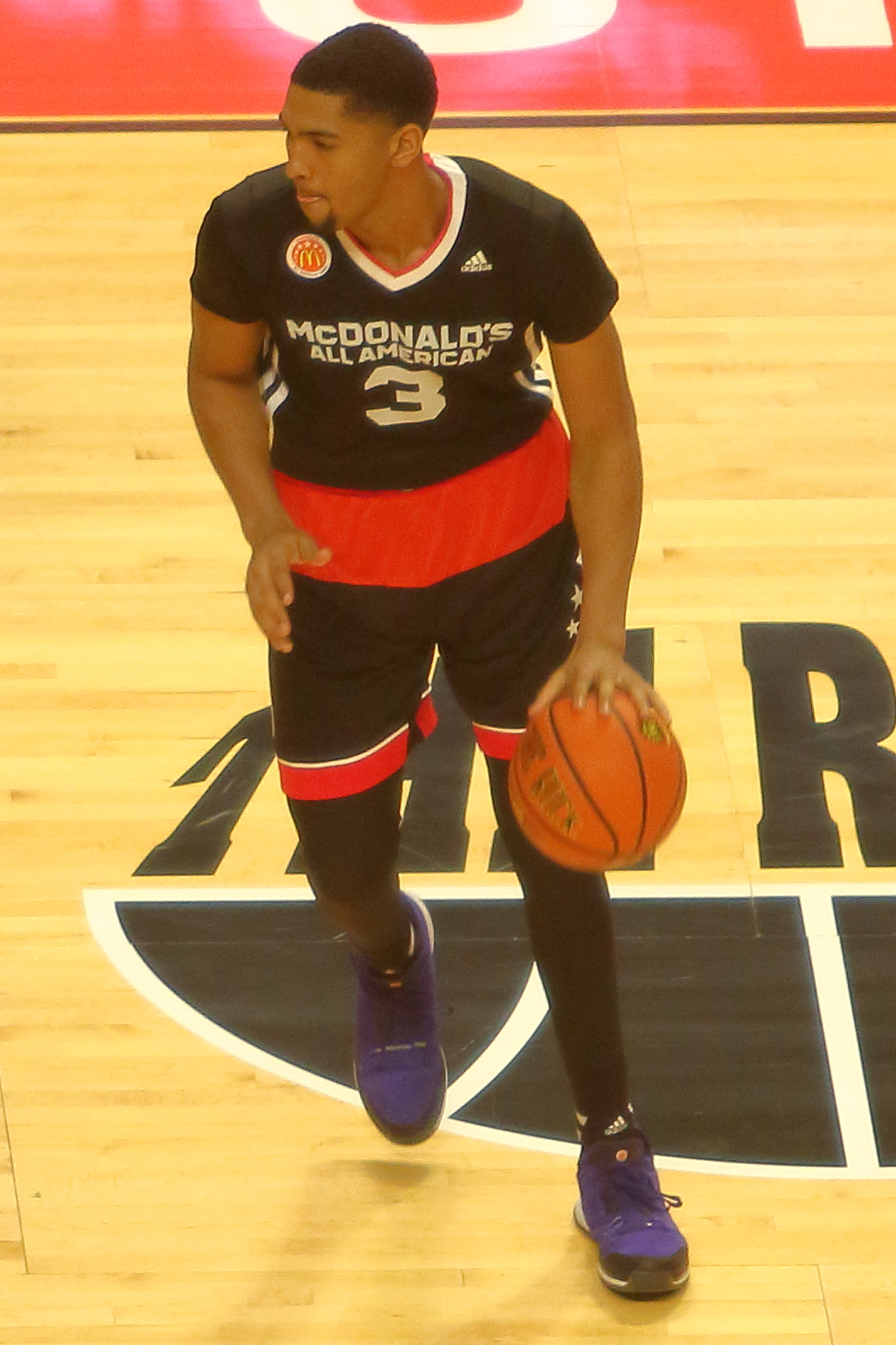
Dedric Lawson at the 2015 McDonald's All-American Boys Game

College recruiting
Name	Hometown	School	Height	Weight	Commit date
Randall Broddie; Point guard	Oxon Hill, MD	Potomoc	6 ft 2 in (1.88 m)	165 lb (75 kg)	Oct 20, 2014
Randall Broddie; Point guard	Recruit ratings: Scout: Rivals: 247Sports: (76)				
Dedric Lawson; Power forward	Memphis, TN	Hamilton	6 ft 8 in (2.03 m)	200 lb (91 kg)	Jul 20, 2014
Dedric Lawson; Power forward	Recruit ratings: Scout: Rivals: 247Sports: (89)				
K. J. Lawson; Small forward	Memphis, TN	Hamilton	6 ft 7 in (2.01 m)	190 lb (86 kg)	Oct 7, 2013
K. J. Lawson; Small forward	Recruit ratings: Scout: Rivals: 247Sports: (86)				
Nick Marshall; Center	Lexington, TN	Lexington	6 ft 10 in (2.08 m)	230 lb (100 kg)	Aug 26, 2014
Nick Marshall; Center	Recruit ratings: Scout: Rivals: 247Sports: (85)				
Jeremiah Martin; Point guard	Memphis, TN	Mitchell	6 ft 2 in (1.88 m)	175 lb (79 kg)	Apr 21, 2015
Jeremiah Martin; Point guard	Recruit ratings: Scout: Rivals: 247Sports: (70)				
Raquan Mitchell; Shooting guard	Miami, FL	Southridge	6 ft 3 in (1.91 m)	175 lb (79 kg)	Oct 10, 2015
Raquan Mitchell; Shooting guard	Recruit ratings: Scout: Rivals: 247Sports: (NR)				
Craig Randall II; Shooting guard	Phoenix, AZ	Shadow Mountain	6 ft 4 in (1.93 m)	170 lb (77 kg)	Jul 19, 2015
Craig Randall II; Shooting guard	Recruit ratings: Scout: Rivals: 247Sports: (79)				
Dante Scott; Shooting guard	Smyrna, GA	Campbell	6 ft 4 in (1.93 m)	205 lb (93 kg)	Jul 1, 2015
Dante Scott; Shooting guard	Recruit ratings: Scout: Rivals: 247Sports: (NR)				
Overall recruit ranking: Scout: 18th Rivals: 17th 247Sports: 12th ESPN: 14th
Note: In many cases, Scout, Rivals, 247Sports, On3, and ESPN may conflict in their listings of height and weight.; In these cases, the average was taken. ESPN grades are on a 100-point scale.; Sources: "2015 Team Ranking". Rivals.

== Roster ==
2015–16 Memphis Tigers men's basketball team
Players
Coaches

Pos.	#	Name	Height	Weight	Year	Hometown
F	0	Trahson Burrell	6 ft 7 in (2.01 m)	187 lb (85 kg)	Sr	Albany, New York
F	1	Dedric Lawson	6 ft 9 in (2.06 m)	228 lb (103 kg)	Fr	Memphis, Tennessee
F	2	Shaq Goodwin	6 ft 9 in (2.06 m)	229 lb (104 kg)	Sr	Atlanta, Georgia
G	3	Avery Woodson	6 ft 2 in (1.88 m)	189 lb (86 kg)	Jr	Waynesboro, Mississippi
G	4	Dante Scott (W)	6 ft 4 in (1.93 m)	210 lb (95 kg)	Fr	Smyrna, Georgia
G	5	Markel Crawford	6 ft 5 in (1.96 m)	205 lb (93 kg)	RS So	Memphis, Tennessee
G	10	Jeremiah Martin	6 ft 2 in (1.88 m)	179 lb (81 kg)	Fr	Memphis, Tennessee
G	11	Randall Broddie	6 ft 3 in (1.91 m)	170 lb (77 kg)	Fr	Oxon Hill, Maryland
G	12	Craig Randall II	6 ft 4 in (1.93 m)	173 lb (78 kg)	Fr	Phoenix, Arizona
G/F	14	K. J. Lawson	6 ft 7 in (2.01 m)	204 lb (93 kg)	Fr	Memphis, Tennessee
G	15	Kedren Johnson	6 ft 4 in (1.93 m)	210 lb (95 kg)	Sr	Lewisburg, Tennessee
G	20	Ricky Tarrant	6 ft 2 in (1.88 m)	184 lb (83 kg)	Sr	Pleasant Grove, Alabama
F	30	Nick Marshall	6 ft 11 in (2.11 m)	248 lb (112 kg)	Fr	Lexington, Tennessee
G	23	Sam Craft (W)	6 ft 0 in (1.83 m)	210 lb (95 kg)	Jr	Memphis, Tennessee
G/F	32	Caleb Wallingford (W)	6 ft 5 in (1.96 m)	214 lb (97 kg)	Sr	Elkhorn, Nebraska
G/F	42	Jake McDowell (W)	6 ft 5 in (1.96 m)	210 lb (95 kg)	Jr	Memphis, Tennessee

Head coach

- Josh Pastner (Arizona)

Assistant coach(es)

- Robert Kirby (Texas–Pan American)
- Keelon Lawson (Union (TN))
- Damon Stoudamire (Arizona)

Legend

- (C) Team captain
- (S) Suspended
- (I) Ineligible
- (W) Walk-on
- Injured
- Current redshirt

Roster
Last update: 11/6/2015

== Season summary ==
On July 7, 2015, rising junior Austin Nichols announced his intention to transfer from Memphis. Nichols, who the leading scorer and rebounder for the Tigers in 2014-15, was expected to lead the team in 2015-16 and was considered a likely first team all AAC player. Memphis initially denied Nichols' transfer request before later providing a release with restrictions. Nichols' attorney made a public statement after the restrictions were made public calling the restrictions a "calculated effort by a dysfunctional staff to punish a player for taking a step to remove himself from a failing program." Nichols' announcement followed the departure of 5 other scholarship players to transfer since August 2014, including Dominic Woodson, Dominic Magee, Kuran Iverson, Nick King, and Pookie Powell. It also left Markel Crawford as the only remaining scholarship player from the Tigers' heralded 2013 recruiting class. The restrictions on Nichols' release were swiftly removed by Memphis Athletic Director Tom Bowen, and Nichols ultimately transferred to the University of Virginia (a team originally on the restricted list).

On December 2, 2015, Coach Pastner informed media that freshman guard Raquan Mitchell, who had not logged a minute of floor time with the Tigers, would be transferring at the end of the semester.

In January, guard Sam Craft joined the basketball team. Craft, a running back and wide receiver for the Memphis football team, had been forbidden from playing basketball by former Memphis football coach Justin Fuente. However, new football coach Mike Norvell lifted the restriction and permitted Craft to play basketball.

After a home loss to AAC last place team East Carolina in January, Memphis newspaper columnist Geoff Calkins declared the Josh Pastner era "over" in Memphis. The Tigers suffered a 20-point home loss to UConn on February 4, 2016, which marked the worst home loss for the Tigers since February 1999.

During the season, attendance at the FedEx Forum for Tigers' games dropped significantly from prior years. The Commercial Appeal discovered via a FOIA request that the actual turnstile attendance at Tiger games had fallen below 6,000 by mid February. The Tigers had previously not announced turnstile attendance figures but rather used tickets sold as official attendance numbers. The turnstile attendance became an issue of interest in the City of Memphis for the Tigers' last three home games of the year because the Tigers' facility usage agreement with the Memphis Grizzlies specified that the Tigers receive an annual payment from the NBA franchise if their turnstile attendance averaged over 6,000 for the year. The Tigers ultimately did achieve an average turnstile attendance figure above 6,000 for the year.

Upon losing to Temple on March 3, the Tigers clinched a losing record in conference for the first time in 16 years. The Tigers were a six seed in the AAC tournament, but they defeated each of their first two tournament opponents (3 seed Tulsa and 10 seed Tulane) by at least 20 points. The Tigers faced 5 seed UConn in the AAC Tournament championship but were soundly defeated.

Head coach Josh Pastner left Memphis to take the head coaching job at Georgia Tech on April 8, 2016.

== Schedule ==
Date time, TV	Rank^{#}	Opponent^{#}	Result	Record	Site (attendance) city, state
Exhibition
11/06/2015*; 8:00 pm		LeMoyne–Owen	W 107–88		FedEx Forum; Memphis, TN
Regular season
11/14/2015*; 7:00 pm, ESPN3		Southern Miss	W 67–49	1–0	FedEx Forum (11,786); Memphis, TN
11/17/2015*; 4:00 pm, ESPN		No. 8 Oklahoma; College Hoops Tip-Off Marathon	L 78–84	1–1	FedEx Forum (12,688); Memphis, TN
11/19/2015*; 7:00 pm, ESPN3		Grambling State; Hoophall Miami Invitational	W 83–65	2–1	FedEx Forum (11,286); Memphis, TN
11/23/2015*; 7:30 pm, ESPNews		Texas–Arlington; Hoophall Miami Invitational	L 64–68	2–2	FedEx Forum (11,184); Memphis, TN
11/27/2015*; 6:30 pm, ESPN		vs. Ohio State; Hoophall Miami Invitational	W 81–76 ^{OT}	3–2	American Airlines Arena (10,023); Miami, FL
12/01/2015*; 8:00 pm, CBSSN		Louisiana Tech; Hoophall Miami Invitational	W 94–68	4–2	FedEx Forum (11,114); Memphis, TN
12/05/2015*; 6:00 pm, CBSSN		Southeast Missouri State	W 80–65	5–2	FedEx Forum (11,453); Memphis, TN
12/12/2015*; 7:00 pm, ESPN3		Manhattan	W 89–57	6–2	FedEx Forum (11,458); Memphis, TN
12/15/2015*; 7:00 pm, ESPN3		Southern	W 72–67	7–2	FedEx Forum (10,752); Memphis, TN
12/18/2015*; 7:00 pm, ESPNews		Ole Miss	L 79–85	7–3	FedEx Forum (14,529); Memphis, TN
12/22/2015*; 7:00 pm, ESPN3		IUPUI	W 84–48	8–3	FedEx Forum (10,655); Memphis, TN
12/29/2015; 11:00 am, ESPNU		Tulane	W 77–65	9–3 (1–0)	FedEx Forum (10,721); Memphis, TN
01/02/2016*; 5:00 pm, ESPNU		at No. 24 South Carolina	L 76–86	9–4	Colonial Life Arena (13,035); Columbia, SC
01/05/2016*; 7:00 pm, ESPN3		Nicholls State	W 82–46	10–4	FedEx Forum (10,290); Memphis, TN
01/09/2016; 6:00 pm, ESPN2		at No. 23 UConn	L 78–81	10–5 (1–1)	Gampel Pavilion (9,409); Storrs, CT
01/13/2016; 7:00 pm, CBSSN		Temple	W 67–65	11–5 (2–1)	FedEx Forum (12,247); Memphis, TN
01/16/2016; 11:00 am, CBSSN		South Florida	W 71–56	12–5 (3–1)	FedEx Forum (11,681); Memphis, TN
01/21/2016; 6:00 pm, ESPN2		at Cincinnati	L 72–76	12–6 (3–2)	Fifth Third Arena (10,320); Cincinnati, OH
01/24/2016; 1:00 pm, CBSSN		East Carolina	L 83–84	12–7 (3–3)	FedEx Forum (11,165); Memphis, TN
01/26/2016; 6:00 pm, CBSSN		at UCF	W 97–86	13–7 (4–3)	CFE Arena (4,577); Orlando, FL
01/30/2016; 7:00 pm, ESPNU		at No. 13 SMU	L 68–80	13–8 (4–4)	Moody Coliseum (7,205); Dallas, TX
02/04/2016; 8:00 pm, ESPN2		UConn	L 57–77	13–9 (4–5)	FedEx Forum (13,323); Memphis, TN
02/06/2016; 11:00 am, ESPN2		Cincinnati	W 63–59	14–9 (5–5)	FedEx Forum (12,920); Memphis, TN
02/10/2016; 6:00 pm, ESPNU		at Houston	L 90–98	14–10 (5–6)	Hofheinz Pavilion (4,060); Houston, TX
02/13/2016; 1:00 pm, CBSSN		at Tulane	L 87–94 ^{OT}	14–11 (5–7)	Devlin Fieldhouse (1,793); New Orleans, LA
02/17/2016; 6:00 pm, ESPNU		UCF	W 73–56	15–11 (6–7)	FedEx Forum (12,492); Memphis, TN
02/20/2016; 10:00 am, ESPNU		at South Florida	L 71–80	15–12 (6–8)	USF Sun Dome (3,840); Tampa, FL
02/25/2016; 6:00 pm, ESPN2		No. 24 SMU	L 62–69	15–13 (6–9)	FedEx Forum (13,546); Memphis, TN
02/28/2016; 3:00 pm, ESPNU		Tulsa	W 92–82	16–13 (7–9)	FedEx Forum (15,289); Memphis, TN
03/03/2016; 6:00 pm, ESPNU		at Temple	L 62–72	16–14 (7–10)	Liacouras Center (6,390); Philadelphia, PA
03/06/2016; 3:00 pm, CBSSN		at East Carolina	W 83–53	17–14 (8–10)	Williams Arena (4,487); Greenville, NC
American Athletic Conference tournament
03/11/2016; 8:00 pm, ESPNU		vs. Tulsa quarterfinals	W 89–67	18–14	Amway Center; Orlando, FL
03/12/2016; 6:30 pm, ESPN2		vs. Tulane semifinals	W 74–54	19–14	Amway Center (7,465); Orlando, FL
03/13/2016; 2:15 pm, ESPN		vs. UConn championship	L 58–72	19–15	Amway Center (7,990); Orlando, FL
*Non-conference game. ^{#}Rankings from AP Poll. (#) Tournament seedings in parentheses. All times are in Central Time.

== Rankings ==
The Tigers were not ranked and did not receive any top 25 votes in either major poll during the 2015-16 season.
