= 2015–16 UCF Knights men's basketball team =

American college basketball season

2015–16 UCF Knights men's basketball
- Conference: American Athletic Conference
- Record: 12–18 (6–12 AAC)
- Head coach: Donnie Jones (6th season)
- Assistant coaches: Shawn Finney; Darren Tillis; Christian Webster
- Home arena: CFE Arena

2015–16 American Athletic Conference men's basketball standings
	Conf.				Overall
Team	W		L	PCT	W		L	PCT
Temple	14	–	4	.778	21	–	12	.636
No. 24 SMU^{*}	13	–	5	.722	25	–	5	.833
Houston	12	–	6	.667	22	–	10	.688
Cincinnati	12	–	6	.667	22	–	11	.667
Tulsa	12	–	6	.667	20	–	12	.625
UConn †	11	–	7	.611	25	–	11	.694
Memphis	8	–	10	.444	19	–	15	.559
UCF	6	–	12	.333	12	–	18	.400
East Carolina	4	–	14	.222	12	–	20	.375
South Florida	4	–	14	.222	8	–	25	.242
Tulane	3	–	15	.167	12	–	22	.353
^{*} Ineligible for postseason due to postseason ban † American Athletic Conference tournament Champions; Rankings from AP poll

The 2015–16 UCF Knights men's basketball team represented the University of Central Florida during the 2015–16 NCAA Division I men's basketball season. The Knights were member of the American Athletic Conference. The Knights, in the program's 47th season of basketball, were led by sixth-year head coach Donnie Jones and played their home games at the CFE Arena on the university's main campus in Orlando, Florida. They finished the season with a record of 12–18, 6–12 in AAC play to finish in seventh place in the conference. They lost in the first round of the AAC tournament to Tulane. After the season, Donnie Jones was fired as UCF's head coach.

== Previous season ==
The Knights finished the 2014–15 season with a record of 12–18, 5–13 in AAC play to finish in ninth place in the conference. They lost in the first round of the AAC tournament to East Carolina.

== Departures ==
Name	Number	Pos.	Height	Weight	Year	Hometown	Reason for departure
Isiah Thomas	2	G	5'11"	160	Freshman	Wesley Chapel, FL	Walk-on; didn't return
Brandon Goodwin	11	G	6'0"	180	Sophomore	Norcross, GA	Transferred to Florida Gulf Coast
Dylan Karell	15	C	6'11"	240	Junior	North Miami Beach, FL	Transferred to Florida Southern
Myles Davis	20	G	6'3"	185	Senior	Winter Haven, FL	Graduated
Marshall Holmes	25	G	6'3"	175	Freshman	Tampa, FL	Transferred
Kasey Wilson	32	F	6'7"	235	Senior	North Port, FL	Graduated

=== Incoming transfers ===
Name	Number	Pos.	Height	Weight	Year	Hometown	Previous school
Tanksley Efianayi	13	G	6'6"	210	Junior	Orlando, FL	Junior college transferred from Daytona State College

== Incoming recruits ==
College recruiting
Name	Hometown	School	Height	Weight	Commit date
Tacko Fall; C	Dakar, Sengal	Liberty Christian Prep	7 ft 5 in (2.26 m)	270 lb (120 kg)	Oct 28, 2014
Tacko Fall; C	Recruit ratings: Scout: Rivals: (81)				
Chance McSpadden; SG	Winter Haven, FL	Winter Haven High School	6 ft 3 in (1.91 m)	175 lb (79 kg)	May 1, 2014
Chance McSpadden; SG	Recruit ratings: Scout: Rivals: (78)				
Chad Brown; C	Deltona, FL	Deltona High School	6 ft 8 in (2.03 m)	225 lb (102 kg)	Sep 26, 2013
Chad Brown; C	Recruit ratings: Scout: Rivals: (77)				
Overall recruit ranking:
Note: In many cases, Scout, Rivals, 247Sports, On3, and ESPN may conflict in their listings of height and weight.; In these cases, the average was taken. ESPN grades are on a 100-point scale.; Sources: "2015 Team Ranking". Rivals.

== Roster ==
2015–16 UCF Knights men's basketball team
Players
Coaches

Pos.	#	Name	Height	Weight	Year	Hometown
G	00	Brendan Boyle	6 ft 1 in (1.85 m)	190 lb (86 kg)	Fr	Rahway, NJ
G	1	B. J. Taylor	6 ft 2 in (1.88 m)	200 lb (91 kg)	So	Orlando, FL
G/F	3	A. J. Davis	6 ft 9 in (2.06 m)	215 lb (98 kg)	RS So	Buford, GA
G	4	Daiquan Walker	6 ft 2 in (1.88 m)	185 lb (84 kg)	Sr	Philadelphia, PA
G	5	Djordjije Mumin (W)	6 ft 5 in (1.96 m)	205 lb (93 kg)	So	Podgorica, Montenegro
G	10	Adonys Henriquez	6 ft 6 in (1.98 m)	210 lb (95 kg)	So	Orlando, FL
G	12	Matt Williams	6 ft 5 in (1.96 m)	220 lb (100 kg)	RS Jr	Orlando, FL
G/F	13	Tanksley Efianayi	6 ft 6 in (1.98 m)	210 lb (95 kg)	Jr	Orlando, FL
G/F	21	Brian Brown	5 ft 9 in (1.75 m)	180 lb (82 kg)	Fr	Deltona, FL
G	22	Chance McSpadden	6 ft 4 in (1.93 m)	180 lb (82 kg)	Fr	Parris, FL
C	24	Tacko Fall	7 ft 6 in (2.29 m)	300 lb (136 kg)	Fr	Dakar, Sengal
F	33	Shaheed Davis	6 ft 9 in (2.06 m)	210 lb (95 kg)	Sr	Warren, OH
C	34	Justin McBride	6 ft 10 in (2.08 m)	325 lb (147 kg)	Jr	Starke, FL
F	52	Staphon Blair	6 ft 9 in (2.06 m)	255 lb (116 kg)	Sr	Fort Lauderdale, FL

Head coach

- Donnie Jones (Pikeville)

Assistant coach(es)

- Shawn Finney (Fairmont)
- Darren Tillis (Paul Quinn)
- Christian Webster (Harvard)

Legend

- (C) Team captain
- (S) Suspended
- (I) Ineligible
- (W) Walk-on
- Injured
- Current redshirt

Roster

== Schedule and results ==
Date time, TV	Rank^{#}	Opponent^{#}	Result	Record	Site (attendance) city, state
Non-conference regular season
11/14/2015*; 7:30 pm		at Davidson	L 85–90	0–1	John M. Belk Arena (4,676); Davidson, NC
11/18/2015*; 7:00 pm, ESPN3		UC Irvine	L 60–61 ^{OT}	0–2	CFE Arena (5,629); Orlando, FL
11/21/2015*; 7:00 pm, ESPN3		UNC Greensboro	W 65–54	1–2	CFE Arena (3,607); Orlando, FL
11/28/2015*; 1:30 pm		at Miami (OH)	L 63–64	1–3	Millett Hall (1,254); Oxford, OH
12/02/2015*; 8:00 pm, ESPN3		at Stetson	W 94–85	2–3	Edmunds Center (2,150); DeLand, FL
12/05/2015*; 7:00 pm, ESPN3		UIC	W 88–58	3–3	CFE Arena (4,208); Orlando, FL
12/08/2015*; 7:00 pm, ESPN3		Massachusetts	W 67–63	4–3	CFE Arena (4,395); Orlando, FL
12/12/2015*; 7:00 pm, ESPN3		Florida Atlantic	W 75–61	5–3	CFE Arena (4,130); Orlando, FL
12/19/2015*; 1:00 pm, ESPN3		at Detroit	L 89–95	5–4	Calihan Hall (2,055); Detroit, MI
12/22/2015*; 7:00 pm, ESPN3		Bethune-Cookman	W 101–96	6–4	CFE Arena (3,734); Orlando, FL
12/29/2015*; 7:00 pm, ESPN3		George Washington	L 50–67	6–5	CFE Arena (3,889); Orlando, FL
American regular season
01/02/2016; 6:00 pm, ESPN3		at East Carolina	W 71–68	7–5 (1–0)	Williams Arena (4,605); Greenville, NC
01/06/2016; 7:00 pm, ESPNews		South Florida	W 75–64	8–5 (2–0)	CFE Arena (3,603); Orlando, FL
01/10/2016; 4:00 pm, ESPNU		at No. 15 SMU	L 73–88	8–6 (2–1)	Moody Coliseum (6,952); Dallas, TX
01/16/2016; 4:30 pm, ESPNews		East Carolina	W 89–69	9–6 (3–1)	CFE Arena (5,411); Orlando, FL
01/20/2016; 6:15 pm, ESPNews		at South Florida	W 64–54	10–6 (4–1)	USF Sun Dome (3,491); Tampa, FL
01/24/2016; 3:00 pm, ESPN3		at Tulsa	L 60–75	10–7 (4–2)	Reynolds Center (4,270); Tulsa, OK
01/26/2016; 7:00 pm, CBSSN		Memphis	L 86–97	10–8 (4–3)	CFE Arena (4,577); Orlando, FL
01/31/2016; 4:00 pm, CBSSN		UConn	L 41–67	10–9 (4–4)	CFE Arena (6,414); Orlando, FL
02/04/2016; 8:00 pm, ESPNews		at Tulane	W 70–62	11–9 (5–4)	Devlin Fieldhouse (1,174); New Orleans, LA
02/06/2016; 12:00 pm, ESPNU		Temple	L 60–62	11–10 (5–5)	CFE Arena (3,674); Orlando, FL
02/09/2016; 7:00 pm, ESPNews		Cincinnati	L 51–69	11–11 (5–6)	CFE Arena (4,143); Orlando, FL
02/13/2016; 3:00 pm, ESPNews		at Houston	L 58–82	11–12 (5–7)	Hofheinz Pavilion (4,126); Houston, TX
02/17/2016; 7:00 pm, ESPNU		at Memphis	L 56–73	11–13 (5–8)	FedEx Forum (12,492); Memphis, TN
02/21/2016; 2:00 pm, CBSSN		Tulsa	L 67–75	11–14 (5–9)	CFE Arena (6,437); Orlando, FL
02/24/2016; 7:00 pm, ESPNU		Houston	L 61–88	11–15 (5–10)	CFE Arena (4,664); Orlando, FL
02/27/2016; 12:00 pm, ESPNews		at Temple	L 61–63	11–16 (5–11)	Liacouras Center (7,569); Philadelphia, PA
03/02/2016; 7:00 pm, ESPNews		Tulane	W 73–65	12–16 (6–11)	CFE Arena (3,720); Orlando, FL
03/06/2016; 2:00 pm, ESPNU		at UConn	L 46–67	12–17 (6–12)	Gampel Pavilion (10,167); Storrs, CT
2016 American Athletic Conference tournament
03/10/2016; 6:00 pm, ESPNews		vs. Tulane; First Round	L 63-65	12–18	Amway Center; Orlando, FL
*Non-conference game. ^{#}Rankings from AP Poll. (#) Tournament seedings in parentheses. All times are in Eastern Time.
