= Daniel Hamilton (basketball) =

American basketball player (born 1995)

No. 25 – Al-Faisaly
- Position: Small forward / shooting guard
- League: Jordanian Premier Basketball League

Personal information
- Born: August 8, 1995 (age 30) Los Angeles, California, US
- Listed height: 6 ft 7 in (2.01 m)
- Listed weight: 195 lb (88 kg)

Career information
- High school: Crenshaw (Los Angeles, California); St. John Bosco (Bellflower, California)
- College: UConn (2014–2016)
- NBA draft: 2016: 2nd round, 56th overall pick
- Drafted by: Denver Nuggets
- Playing career: 2016–present

Career history
- 2016–2017: Oklahoma City Blue
- 2017–2018: Oklahoma City Thunder
- 2017–2018: → Oklahoma City Blue
- 2018–2019: Atlanta Hawks
- 2018–2019: → Erie BayHawks
- 2019: Rio Grande Valley Vipers
- 2020: Mets de Guaynabo
- 2020: Frutti Extra Bursaspor
- 2021: Agua Caliente Clippers
- 2021–2022: Petkim Spor
- 2022: Ionikos Nikaias
- 2022: VEF Rīga
- 2022–2023: Ionikos Nikaias
- 2023: Club Malvín
- 2023: Halcones de Xalapa
- 2024: Club Malvín
- 2024: Lobos Plateados de la BUAP
- 2024: Soles de Mexicali
- 2025: Caballeros de Culiacán
- 2025–2026: Beirut Club
- 2026–present: Al-Faisaly

Career highlights
- Second-team All-AAC (2016); AAC Rookie of the Year (2015); AAC tournament MVP (2016); First-team Parade All-American (2014)
- Stats at NBA.com
- Stats at Basketball Reference

Daniel Domonique Hamilton (born August 8, 1995) is an American professional basketball player for Al-Faisaly of the Jordanian Premier Basketball League. He played college basketball for the Connecticut Huskies, and earned second-team all-conference honors in the American Athletic Conference (AAC) as a sophomore. After he decided to forgo his remaining two years of college eligibility, Hamilton was selected in the second round of the 2016 NBA draft by the Denver Nuggets. His draft rights later were traded to the Oklahoma City Thunder.

== High school career ==
Hamilton attended Crenshaw High School in Los Angeles, California, and then St. John Bosco High School in Bellflower, California. As a senior, he averaged 20.5 points. 9.0 rebounds, 5.2 assists and 1.3 steals, leading the Braves to a 23–11 record and the California Division II state championship.

== College career ==
After graduating high school, Hamilton joined the Connecticut Huskies. As a freshman, he averaged 10.9 points, 7.6 rebounds, 3.7 assists and 31.4 minutes in 35 games and was named the AAC Rookie of Year. He became just the second UConn freshman to finish a season with at least 300 points, 200 rebounds and 100 assists.

In a 99–52 blowout of Central Connecticut State on December 23, 2015, Hamilton posted a triple-double with 11 points, 11 rebounds and 11 assists, the 10th Husky to record one. In his sophomore season, Hamilton averaged 12.5 points, a conference-best 8.9 rebounds, 4.7 assists, 1.1 steals and 31.9 minutes in 36 games, being named the Most Outstanding Player of the 2016 AAC Championship and was an AAC All-Conference Second Teamer. After leaving UConn, Hamilton was one of two Division I players (the other being LSU's Ben Simmons) to register more than 450 points, 300 rebounds and 150 assists on the season.

== Professional career ==
On June 23, 2016, Hamilton was selected with the 56th pick of the 2016 NBA draft by the Denver Nuggets, however, he was traded to the Oklahoma City Thunder on draft night. In July, 2016, he joined the Thunder in the 2016 NBA Summer League.

=== Oklahoma City Blue (2016–2017) ===
On November 3, 2016, he was acquired by the Oklahoma City Blue.

=== Oklahoma City Thunder (2017–2018) ===
On August 3, 2017, Hamilton signed a two-way contract with the team that acquired him on draft night, the Oklahoma City Thunder. As a result, he would split the season between the Thunder and the Blue, their G League affiliate.

=== Atlanta Hawks (2018–2019) ===
On August 20, 2018, Hamilton signed with the Atlanta Hawks. On February 8, 2019, Hamilton was waived by the Hawks.

On September 30, 2019, Hamilton was included in the training camp roster of the Cleveland Cavaliers. Hamilton was later waived by the Cleveland Cavaliers on October 15, 2019.

=== Mets de Guaynabo (2020) ===
On February 1, 2020, he has signed with Mets de Guaynabo of the Baloncesto Superior Nacional (BSN).

=== Bursaspor (2020) ===
On July 30, 2020, he has signed with Frutti Extra Bursaspor of the Turkish Super League (BSL).

=== Petkim Spor (2021–2022) ===
On November 8, 2021, Hamilton signed with Petkim Spor of the Turkish Basketball Super League (BSL). He averaged 9.2 points, 4.6 rebounds, and 2.5 assists per game.

=== Ionikos Nikaias (2022) ===
On February 12, 2022, Hamilton signed with Ionikos Nikaias of the Greek Basket League for the rest of the season. In 9 league games, he averaged a spectacular 18.6 points, 10.4 rebounds, 5.6 assists, and 1.2 steals, playing around 37 minutes per contest and helping the club avoid relegation in the process.

=== VEF Rīga (2022) ===
On August 15, 2022, Hamilton signed with VEF Rīga of the Latvian-Estonian Basketball League.

=== Second stint with Ionikos (2022–2023) ===
On November 11, 2022, Hamilton returned to Greece and Ionikos for the rest of the season. On January 7, 2023, he parted ways with the club once more after a rather middling half-season.

== Career statistics ==
Legend
GP	Games played	GS	Games started	MPG	Minutes per game
FG%	Field goal percentage	3P%	3-point field goal percentage	FT%	Free throw percentage
RPG	Rebounds per game	APG	Assists per game	SPG	Steals per game
BPG	Blocks per game	PPG	Points per game	**Bold**	Career high

=== NBA ===
==== Regular season ====
Year	Team	GP	GS	MPG	FG%	3P%	FT%	RPG	APG	SPG	BPG	PPG
2017–18	Oklahoma City	6	0	4.7	**.455**	**.400**	–	.8	**1.3**	.2	.0	2.0
2018–19	Atlanta	**19**	**3**	**10.7**	.383	.348	**.500**	**2.5**	1.2	**.3**	**.1**	**3.0**
Career		25	3	9.3	.394	.357	.500	2.1	1.3	.3	.0	2.8

=== College ===
Year	Team	GP	GS	MPG	FG%	3P%	FT%	RPG	APG	SPG	BPG	PPG
2014–15	Connecticut	35	35	31.4	.380	**.343**	.667	7.6	3.7	0.9	**0.4**	10.9
2015–16	Connecticut	**36**	**36**	**31.9**	**.387**	.331	**.860**	**8.9**	**4.7**	**1.1**	**0.4**	**12.5**
Career		71	71	31.7	.384	.337	.764	8.3	4.2	1.0	0.4	11.7

== Personal ==
Hamilton's older brother Jordan played in the NBA and currently playing for Al-Difaa Al-Jawi Sport Club of the FIBA West Asia Super League (WASL), and another, Isaac, played in college for UCLA.
