= 2015–16 Tulane Green Wave men's basketball team =

American college basketball season

2015–16 Tulane Green Wave men's basketball
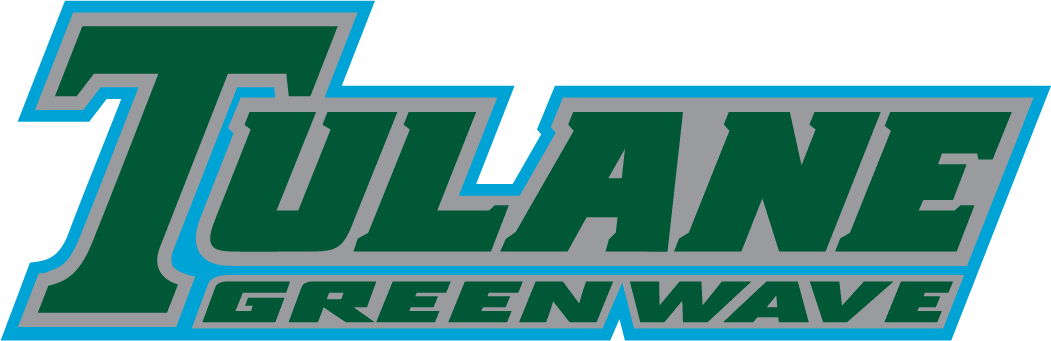
- Conference: American Athletic Conference
- Record: 12–22 (3–15 AAC)
- Head coach: Ed Conroy (6th season)
- Assistant coaches: Shammond Williams; Quannas White; Anthony Wilkins
- Home arena: Devlin Fieldhouse

2015–16 American Athletic Conference men's basketball standings
	Conf.				Overall
Team	W		L	PCT	W		L	PCT
Temple	14	–	4	.778	21	–	12	.636
No. 24 SMU^{*}	13	–	5	.722	25	–	5	.833
Houston	12	–	6	.667	22	–	10	.688
Cincinnati	12	–	6	.667	22	–	11	.667
Tulsa	12	–	6	.667	20	–	12	.625
UConn †	11	–	7	.611	25	–	11	.694
Memphis	8	–	10	.444	19	–	15	.559
UCF	6	–	12	.333	12	–	18	.400
East Carolina	4	–	14	.222	12	–	20	.375
South Florida	4	–	14	.222	8	–	25	.242
Tulane	3	–	15	.167	12	–	22	.353
^{*} Ineligible for postseason due to postseason ban † American Athletic Conference tournament Champions; Rankings from AP poll

The 2015–16 Tulane Green Wave men's basketball team represented Tulane University during the 2015–16 NCAA Division I men's basketball season. The Green Wave, led by sixth-year head coach Ed Conroy, played their home games at Devlin Fieldhouse and were second year members of the American Athletic Conference. They finished the season 12–22, 3–15 in AAC play to finish in last place. They defeated UCF and Houston in the AAC tournament to advance to the semifinals before losing to Memphis.

Following the season, Tulane fired head coach Ed Conroy. On March 25, 2016, the school hired Mike Dunleavy Sr. as head coach.

== Previous season ==
The Green Wave finished the 2014–15 season 15–16, 6–12 in AAC play to finish in a tie for seventh place. They lost in the first round of the AAC tournament to Houston.

== Departures ==
Name	Number	Pos.	Height	Weight	Year	Hometown	Notes
Keith Pinckney	1	G	6'0"	185	Freshman	Lithonia, GA	Transferred to Northwest Florida State College
Jonathan Stark	2	G	6'0"	170	Sophomore	Munford, TN	Transferred to Murray State
Josh Hearlihy	11	G/F	6'8"	213	Sophomore	Los Angeles, CA	Transferred to Vermont
Aaron Liberman	23	C	6'10"	218	Sophomore	North Hollywood, CA	Left the team for personal reasons
Jay Hook	24	G	6'4"	180	Senior	Waco, TX	Graduated
Payton Henson	25	F	6'8"	215	Sophomore	Siloam Springs, AR	Transferred to Vermont
Tre Drye	34	F	6'6"	225	Senior	Baton Rouge, LA	Graduated

=== Incoming transfers ===
Name	Number	Pos.	Height	Weight	Year	Hometown	Previous School
Jernard Jarreau	22	F	6'10"	240	RS Senior	New Orleans, LA	Transferred from Washington. Will be eligible to play immediately since Jarreau graduated from Washington.

== Incoming recruits ==
College recruiting information
Name	Hometown	School	Height	Weight	Commit date
Melvin Frazier; SF	Marrero, LA	L. W. Higgins High School	6 ft 7 in (2.01 m)	205 lb (93 kg)	May 6, 2015
Melvin Frazier; SF	Recruit ratings: Scout: Rivals: (80)				
Blake Paul; C	Metairie, LA	Landry-Walker High School	6 ft 9 in (2.06 m)	225 lb (102 kg)	Oct 18, 2014
Blake Paul; C	Recruit ratings: Scout: Rivals: (77)				
Kain Harris; SG	Chicago, IL	Saint Rita High School	6 ft 4 in (1.93 m)	210 lb (95 kg)	Dec 19, 2014
Kain Harris; SG	Recruit ratings: Scout: Rivals: (77)				
Charvon Julien; PG	Reserve, LA	Riverside Academy	6 ft 1 in (1.85 m)	170 lb (77 kg)	Apr 21, 2015
Charvon Julien; PG	Recruit ratings: Scout: Rivals: (76)				
Taron Oliver; C	Washington, D.C.	Montrose Christian School	6 ft 9 in (2.06 m)	250 lb (110 kg)	Sep 29, 2014
Taron Oliver; C	Recruit ratings: Scout: Rivals: (69)				
Kipper Nichols; SF	Lakewood, OH	Saint Edward High School	6 ft 6 in (1.98 m)	200 lb (91 kg)	Apr 19, 2015
Kipper Nichols; SF	Recruit ratings: Scout: Rivals: (NR)				
Overall recruit ranking:
Note: In many cases, Scout, Rivals, 247Sports, On3, and ESPN may conflict in their listings of height and weight.; In these cases, the average was taken. ESPN grades are on a 100-point scale.; Sources: "2015 Team Ranking". Rivals.

== Roster ==
2015–16 Tulane Green Wave men's basketball team
Players
Coaches
}

Pos.	#	Name	Height	Weight	Year	Previous school	Hometown
G	0	Louis Dabney	6 ft 3 in (1.91 m)	210 lb (95 kg)	Sr	Riverside Academy	New Orleans, LA
F	2	Taron Oliver	6 ft 9 in (2.06 m)	310 lb (141 kg)	Fr	Montrose Christian	Oxon Hill, MD
G	3	Kajon Mack	6 ft 3 in (1.91 m)	185 lb (84 kg)	RS Jr	Junípero Serra	Los Angeles, CA
G	4	Riley Conroy (W)	5 ft 11 in (1.8 m)	175 lb (79 kg)	RS Fr	Jesuit	New Orleans, LA
G	5	Cameron Reynolds	6 ft 7 in (2.01 m)	215 lb (98 kg)	RS So	Pearland	Perland, TX
G	10	Von Julien	6 ft 1 in (1.85 m)	160 lb (73 kg)	Fr	Riverside Academy	Reserve, LA
G	11	Kain Harris	6 ft 4 in (1.93 m)	210 lb (95 kg)	Fr	St. Rita of Cascia	Chicago, IL
G	13	Malik Morgan	6 ft 4 in (1.93 m)	205 lb (93 kg)	RS Jr	LSU; John Curtis	River Ridge, LA
C	15	Ryan Smith	6 ft 10 in (2.08 m)	250 lb (113 kg)	Jr	Lutheran	Wildomar, CA
C	21	Dylan Osetkowski	6 ft 9 in (2.06 m)	255 lb (116 kg)	So	JSerra Catholic	San Juan Capistrano, CA
F	22	Jernard Jarreau	6 ft 10 in (2.08 m)	235 lb (107 kg)	RS Sr	McDonogh No. 35; Washington	New Orleans, LA
F	23	Blake Paul	6 ft 9 in (2.06 m)	230 lb (104 kg)	Fr	Landry-Walker	New Orleans, LA
F	32	Stanley Roberts, Jr.	6 ft 8 in (2.03 m)	250 lb (113 kg)	So	Palos Verdes Peninsula	Rolling Hills Estates, CA
G	35	Melvin Frazier	6 ft 5 in (1.96 m)	200 lb (91 kg)	Fr	L. W. Higgins	Avondale, LA

Head coach

- Ed Conroy (The Citadel)

Assistant coach(es)

- Shammond Williams (North Carolina)
- Quannas White (Oklahoma)
- Anthony Wilkins (Kent State)

Legend

- (C) Team captain
- (S) Suspended
- (I) Ineligible
- (W) Walk-on
- Injured
- Current redshirt

Roster

== Schedule ==
Date time, TV	Rank^{#}	Opponent^{#}	Result	Record	Site (attendance) city, state
Exhibition
11/05/2015*; 8:00 pm		Loyola (New Orleans)	W 89–69		Devlin Fieldhouse; New Orleans, LA
Non-conference regular season
11/13/2015*; 8:00 pm, ESPN3		Alabama A&M	L 67–68 ^{OT}	0–1	Devlin Fieldhouse (1,126); New Orleans, LA
11/16/2015*; 7:00 pm, ESPN3		Drake	W 79–74 ^{OT}	1–1	Devlin Fieldhouse (1,411); New Orleans, LA
11/19/2015*; 7:00 pm		at Southern	L 82–90	1–2	F. G. Clark Center (2,356); Baton Rouge, LA
11/22/2015*; 3:30 pm, ESPN3		Appalachian State; Challenge in Music City	W 76–48	2–2	Devlin Fieldhouse (962); New Orleans, LA
11/26/2015*; 6:00 pm		vs. Mercer; Challenge in Music City	L 61–71	2–3	Nashville Municipal Auditorium (350); Nashville, TN
11/27/2015*; 7:30 pm		vs. Stephen F. Austin; Challenge in Music City	W 60–59	3–3	Nashville Municipal Auditorium; Nashville, TN
11/29/2015*; 11:00 am		vs. Liberty; Challenge in Music City	W 72–51	4–3	Nashville Municipal Auditorium; Nashville, TN
12/02/2015*; 7:00 pm, ESPN3		New Orleans	W 64–62	5–3	Devlin Fieldhouse (1,581); New Orleans, LA
12/05/2015*; 4:00 pm, CBSSN		Georgia Tech	L 68–76	5–4	Devlin Fieldhouse (2,005); New Orleans, LA
12/14/2015*; 7:00 pm, ESPN3		Prairie View A&M	W 63–49	6–4	Devlin Fieldhouse (1,999); New Orleans, LA
12/16/2015*; 6:00 pm, ESPN2		at No. 11 North Carolina	L 72–96	6–5	Dean Smith Center (16,199); Chapel Hill, NC
12/19/2015*; 3:00 pm, SECN		at Mississippi State	L 59–69	6–6	Humphrey Coliseum (4,804); Starkville, MS
12/22/2015*; 6:00 pm, ESPN3		Southern Miss	W 59–40	7–6	Devlin Fieldhouse (1,541); New Orleans, LA
Conference regular season
12/29/2015; 11:00 am, ESPNU		at Memphis	L 65–77	7–7 (0–1)	FedEx Forum (10,721); Memphis, TN
01/02/2016; 6:30 pm, CBSSN		UConn	L 67–75	7–8 (0–2)	Devlin Fieldhouse (2,243); New Orleans, LA
01/05/2016; 8:00 pm, ESPNU		at Houston	L 45–63	7–9 (0–3)	Hofheinz Pavilion (3,235); Houston, TX
01/10/2016; 1:00 pm, ESPN3		Tulsa	L 67–81	7–10 (0–4)	Devlin Fieldhouse (2,234); New Orleans, LA
01/12/2016; 6:00 pm, ESPNews		at South Florida	W 81–70	8–10 (1–4)	USF Sun Dome (2,657); Tampa, FL
01/17/2016; 2:00 pm, ESPN3		No. 10 SMU	L 45–60	8–11 (1–5)	Devlin Fieldhouse; New Orleans, LA
01/19/2016; 6:00 pm, CBSSN		at UConn	L 42–60	8–12 (1–6)	XL Center (9,516); Hartford, CT
01/24/2016; 11:00 am, ESPNU		at Cincinnati	L 75–97	8–13 (1–7)	Fifth Third Arena (9,224); Cincinnati, OH
01/27/2016; 7:00 pm, ESPN3		South Florida	L 60–73	8–14 (1–8)	Devlin Fieldhouse (2,429); New Orleans, LA
01/30/2016; 5:00 pm, ESPNU		at Tulsa	L 48–62	8–15 (1–9)	Reynolds Center (4,926); Tulsa, OK
02/04/2016; 7:00 pm, ESPNews		UCF	L 62–70	8–16 (1–10)	Devlin Fieldhouse (1,174); New Orleans, LA
02/10/2016; 5:15 pm, ESPNews		at East Carolina	W 100–92 ^{3OT}	9–16 (2–10)	Williams Arena (3,656); Greenville, NC
02/13/2016; 1:00 pm, CBSSN		Memphis	W 94–87 ^{OT}	10–16 (3–10)	Devlin Fieldhouse (1,793); New Orleans, LA
02/17/2016; 8:30 pm, ESPNews		Houston	L 69–82	10–17 (3–11)	Devlin Fieldhouse (1,593); New Orleans, LA
02/24/2016; 7:00 pm, ESPNews		East Carolina	L 73–79	10–18 (3–12)	Devlin Fieldhouse (1,638); New Orleans, LA
02/28/2016; 2:00 pm, CBSSN		at No. 24 SMU	L 53–74	10–19 (3–13)	Moody Coliseum (6,781); Dallas, TX
03/02/2016; 6:00 pm, ESPNews		at UCF	L 65–73	10–20 (3–14)	CFE Arena (3,720); Orlando, FL
03/06/2016; 2:00 pm, ESPN3		Temple	L 56–64	10–21 (3–15)	Devlin Fieldhouse (1,847); New Orleans, LA
2016 American Athletic Conference tournament
03/10/2016; 5:00 pm, ESPNews		vs. UCF; First round	W 65–63	11–21	Amway Center (8,723); Orlando, FL
03/11/2016; 6:00 pm, ESPNU		vs. Houston; Quarterfinals	W 72–69	12–21	Amway Center (7,218); Orlando, FL
03/12/2016; 4:00 pm, ESPN2		vs. Memphis; Semifinals	L 54–74	12–22	Amway Center; Orlando, FL
*Non-conference game. ^{#}Rankings from AP Poll. (#) Tournament seedings in parentheses. All times are in Central Time.
