= 2015–16 Tulsa Golden Hurricane men's basketball team =

American college basketball season

2015–16 Tulsa Golden Hurricane men's basketball

NCAA tournament, First Four
- Conference: American Athletic Conference
- Record: 20–12 (12–6 The American)
- Head coach: Frank Haith (2nd season)
- Assistant coaches: Dennis Felton; Michael Schwartz; Shea Seals
- Home arena: Reynolds Center

2015–16 American Athletic Conference men's basketball standings
| | Conf. | | | | Overall |
| Team | W | | L | PCT | W | | L | PCT |
|---|---|---|---|---|---|---|---|---|
| Temple | 14 | – | 4 | .778 | 21 | – | 12 | .636 |
| No. 24 SMU^{*} | 13 | – | 5 | .722 | 25 | – | 5 | .833 |
| Houston | 12 | – | 6 | .667 | 22 | – | 10 | .688 |
| Cincinnati | 12 | – | 6 | .667 | 22 | – | 11 | .667 |
| Tulsa | 12 | – | 6 | .667 | 20 | – | 12 | .625 |
| UConn † | 11 | – | 7 | .611 | 25 | – | 11 | .694 |
| Memphis | 8 | – | 10 | .444 | 19 | – | 15 | .559 |
| UCF | 6 | – | 12 | .333 | 12 | – | 18 | .400 |
| East Carolina | 4 | – | 14 | .222 | 12 | – | 20 | .375 |
| South Florida | 4 | – | 14 | .222 | 8 | – | 25 | .242 |
| Tulane | 3 | – | 15 | .167 | 12 | – | 22 | .353 |
^{*} Ineligible for postseason due to postseason ban † American Athletic Conference tournament Champions; Rankings from AP poll

The 2015–16 Tulsa Golden Hurricane men's basketball team represented the University of Tulsa during the 2015–16 NCAA Division I men's basketball season. The Golden Hurricane, led by second year head coach Frank Haith, played their home games at the Reynolds Center and were members of the American Athletic Conference. They finished the season 20–12, 12–6 in The American play to finish in a three-way tie for third place. They lost in the quarterfinals of The American Athletic tournament to Memphis. They received an at-large bid to the NCAA tournament where they lost in the First Four to Michigan.

== Previous season ==
The Golden Hurricane finished the season 23–11, 14–4 in American Athletic play to finish in second place. They advanced to the semifinals of the American Athletic tournament where they lost to UConn. They were invited to the National Invitation Tournament where they defeated William & Mary in the first round before losing in the second round to Murray State.

== Departures ==
| Name | Number | Pos. | Height | Weight | Year | Hometown | Notes |
|---|---|---|---|---|---|---|---|
| Micah Littlejohn | 11 | G/F | 6'6" | 191 | Freshman | Mansfield, TX | Transferred to Seward County CC |
| Stevie Repichowski | 23 | G | 6'5" | 193 | Sophomore | Lansing, MI | Transferred to Nicholls State |
| Kenodre Dew | 35 | G | 6'8" | 210 | Freshman | San Bernardino, CA | Transferred to City College of San Francisco |

=== Incoming transfers ===
| Name | Number | Pos. | Height | Weight | Year | Hometown | Notes |
|---|---|---|---|---|---|---|---|
| Junior Etou | 0 | F | 6'7" | 240 | Junior | Republic of the Congo | Transferred from Rutgers. Under NCAA transfer rules, Etou will have to sit out for the 2015–16 season. Will have two years of remaining eligibility. |
| Patrick Birt | 11 | G | 6'5" | 190 | Junior | Plano, TX | Junior college transferred from South Plains College |

== Class of 2015 commitments ==
College recruiting information
| Name | Hometown | School | Height | Weight | Commit date |
|---|---|---|---|---|---|
| Sterling Taplin; PG | Williamsville, NY | St. Thomas More School | 6 ft 2 in (1.88 m) | 185 lb (84 kg) | Jan 1, 2014 |
| Sterling Taplin; PG | Recruit ratings: Scout: Rivals: (72) | | | | |
| Kajon Brown; SG | Harvey, LA | Helen Cox High School | 6 ft 2 in (1.88 m) | 185 lb (84 kg) | Apr 30, 2015 |
| Kajon Brown; SG | Recruit ratings: Scout: Rivals: (NR) | | | | |
Overall recruit ranking:
Note: In many cases, Scout, Rivals, 247Sports, On3, and ESPN may conflict in their listings of height and weight.; In these cases, the average was taken. ESPN grades are on a 100-point scale.; Sources: "Tulsa 2015 Basketball Commitments". Rivals.; "2015 Team Ranking". Rivals.

=== Class of 2016 commitments ===
College recruiting information (2016)
| Name | Hometown | School | Height | Weight | Commit date |
|---|---|---|---|---|---|
| Lawson Korita; SG | Little Rock, AR | Pulaski Academy | 6 ft 3 in (1.91 m) | 180 lb (82 kg) | Jun 30, 2015 |
| Lawson Korita; SG | Recruit ratings: Scout: Rivals: (NR) | | | | |
Overall recruit ranking:
Note: In many cases, Scout, Rivals, 247Sports, On3, and ESPN may conflict in their listings of height and weight.; In these cases, the average was taken. ESPN grades are on a 100-point scale.; Sources: "Tulsa 2016 Basketball Commitments". Rivals.; "2016 Team Ranking". Rivals.

== Roster ==
2015–16 Tulsa Golden Hurricane men's basketball team
Players
Coaches

| Pos. | # | Name | Height | Weight | Year | Previous school | Hometown |
|---|---|---|---|---|---|---|---|
| F | 0 | Junior Etou (I) (redshirt) | 6 ft 7 in (2.01 m) | 240 lb (109 kg) | Jr | Rutgers | Republic of Congo |
| G | 1 | Rashad Smith | 6 ft 7 in (2.01 m) | 205 lb (93 kg) | Sr | Plano HS | Plano, TX |
| G | 2 | Cory Haith (W) | 5 ft 11 in (1.8 m) | 175 lb (79 kg) | RS Jr | Missouri | Miami, FL |
| G | 3 | Shaquille Harrison | 6 ft 4 in (1.93 m) | 189 lb (86 kg) | Sr | Lee's Summit | Kansas City, MO |
| G | 4 | Sterling Taplin | 6 ft 1 in (1.85 m) | 189 lb (86 kg) | Fr | St. Thomas More School | Williamsville, NY |
| G | 5 | Rashad Ray | 5 ft 10 in (1.78 m) | 172 lb (78 kg) | Sr | O. Perry Walker HS | New Orleans, LA |
| G | 10 | James Woodard | 6 ft 3 in (1.91 m) | 192 lb (87 kg) | Sr | Edmond Memorial | Arcadia, OK |
| G | 11 | Pat Birt | 6 ft 5 in (1.96 m) | 182 lb (83 kg) | Jr | UIC; South Plains College | Plano, TX |
| G | 13 | Kajon Brown | 6 ft 4 in (1.93 m) | 185 lb (84 kg) | Fr | Helen Cox | Harvey, LA |
| F | 14 | TK Edogi | 6 ft 8 in (2.03 m) | 215 lb (98 kg) | Jr | Westwind Prep | Surprise, AZ |
| G | 15 | Marquel Curtis | 6 ft 3 in (1.91 m) | 202 lb (92 kg) | RS Sr | Williston State College | Plymouth, MN |
| G | 22 | Nick Wood (W) | 6 ft 1 in (1.85 m) | 168 lb (76 kg) | Sr | Cascia Hall Prep | Tulsa, OK |
| F | 40 | D'Andre Wright | 6 ft 9 in (2.06 m) | 245 lb (111 kg) | Sr | Eisenhower HS | Lawton, OK |
| F | 44 | Brandon Swannegan | 6 ft 9 in (2.06 m) | 209 lb (95 kg) | Sr | Cypress Ridge HS | Houston, TX |
| F | 55 | Emmanuel Ezechinonso | 6 ft 11 in (2.11 m) | 267 lb (121 kg) | Sr | Covenant Christian Ministries Academy | Lagos, Nigeria |

Head coach

- Frank Haith (Elon)

Assistant coach(es)

- Dennis Felton (Howard)
- Michael Schwartz (Texas)
- Shea Seals (Tulsa)

Legend

- (C) Team captain
- (S) Suspended
- (I) Ineligible
- (W) Walk-on
- Injured
- Current redshirt

Roster

== Schedule ==
| Date time, TV | Rank^{#} | Opponent^{#} | Result | Record | Site (attendance) city, state |
Exhibition
| November 7, 2015*; 4:00 pm | | Haskell Indian Nations | W 87–62 | | Reynolds Center (3,430); Tulsa, OK |
| November 11, 2015*; 7:00 pm | | Rogers State | W 66–56 | | Reynolds Center (3,625); Tulsa, OK |
Non-conference regular season
| November 14, 2015*; 4:00 pm, ESPN3 | | Central Arkansas | W 98–81 | 1–0 | Reynolds Center (3,839); Tulsa, OK |
| November 17, 2015*; 7:00 pm, ESPN3 | | No. 9 Wichita State | W 77–67 | 2–0 | Reynolds Center (5,670); Tulsa, OK |
| November 20, 2015*; 12:00 pm | | vs. Ohio; Paradise Jam quarterfinals | W 90–88 | 3–0 | Sports and Fitness Center; St. Thomas, VI |
| November 22, 2015*; 5:30 pm, CBSSN | | vs. Indiana State; Paradise Jam semifinals | W 67–59 | 4–0 | Sports and Fitness Center; St. Thomas, VI |
| November 23, 2015*; 8:00 pm, CBSSN | | vs. South Carolina; Paradise Jam championship game | L 75–83 | 4–1 | Sports and Fitness Center (2,002); St. Thomas, VI |
| November 28, 2015*; 3:00 pm, ESPN3 | | Arkansas–Little Rock | L 60–64 | 4–2 | Reynolds Center (3,821); Tulsa, OK |
| December 2, 2015*; 7:00 pm | | at Oklahoma State | W 66–56 | 5–2 | Gallagher-Iba Arena (5,422); Stillwater, OK |
| December 5, 2015*; 3:00 pm, ESPN3 | | Oral Roberts; PSO Mayor's Cup | L 68–70 | 5–3 | Reynolds Center (5,225); Tulsa, OK |
| December 8, 2015*; 8:00 pm, ESPN3 | | Iona | W 90–81 | 6–3 | Reynolds Center (3,800); Tulsa, OK |
| December 13, 2015*; 2:00 pm, ESPN3 | | at Missouri State | W 70–61 | 7–3 | JQH Arena (4,052); Springfield, MO |
| December 19, 2015*; 10:00 pm, P12N | | vs. Oregon State; Far West Classic | L 71–76 | 7–4 | Moda Center (8,555); Portland, OR |
| December 22, 2015*; 7:00 pm, ESPN3 | | Northern Arizona | W 90–55 | 8–4 | Reynolds Center (4,752); Tulsa, OK |
Conference regular season
| December 29, 2015; 4:00 pm, ESPN2 | | No. 17 SMU | L 69–81 | 8–5 (0–1) | Reynolds Center (5,364); Tulsa, OK |
| January 2, 2016; 3:00 pm, ESPNU | | at No. 22 Cincinnati | L 57–76 | 8–6 (0–2) | Fifth Third Arena (10,102); Cincinnati, OH |
| January 5, 2016; 6:00 pm, ESPNews | | East Carolina | W 55–43 | 9–6 (1–2) | Reynolds Center (4,244); Tulsa, OK |
| January 10, 2016; 5:00 pm, ESPN3 | | at Tulane | W 81–67 | 10–6 (2–2) | Devlin Fieldhouse (2,234); New Orleans, LA |
| January 14, 2016; 6:00 pm, ESPN2 | | UConn | W 60–51 | 11–6 (3–2) | Reynolds Center (5,192); Tulsa, OK |
| January 19, 2016; 6:00 pm, ESPNews | | at East Carolina | W 84–69 | 12–6 (4–2) | Williams Arena (3,878); Greenville, NC |
| January 24, 2016; 2:00 pm, ESPN3 | | UCF | W 75–60 | 13–6 (5–2) | Reynolds Center (4,270); Tulsa, OK |
| January 27, 2016; 7:00 pm, ESPNews | | at Houston | L 66–81 | 13–7 (5–3) | Hofheinz Pavilion (3,185); Houston, TX |
| January 30, 2016; 5:00 pm, ESPNU | | Tulane | W 62–48 | 14–7 (6–3) | Reynolds Center (4,926); Tulsa, OK |
| February 4, 2016; 6:00 pm, ESPNU | | at Temple | L 79–83 ^{OT} | 14–8 (6–4) | Liacouras Center (5,929); Philadelphia, PA |
| February 7, 2016; 2:00 pm, ESPNU | | Houston | W 77–63 | 15–8 (7–4) | Reynolds Center (4,321); Tulsa, OK |
| February 10, 2016; 8:00 pm, CBSSN | | at No. 16 SMU | W 82–77 | 16–8 (8–4) | Moody Coliseum (6,582); Dallas, TX |
| February 13, 2016; 7:00 pm, ESPN2 | | at UConn | L 73–75 | 16–9 (8–5) | Gampel Pavilion (10,167); Storrs, CT |
| February 18, 2016; 8:00 pm, CBSSN | | Cincinnati | W 70–68 ^{OT} | 17–9 (9–5) | Reynolds Center (4,402); Tulsa, OK |
| February 21, 2016; 1:00 pm, CBSSN | | at UCF | W 75–67 | 18–9 (10–5) | CFE Arena (6,437); Orlando, FL |
| February 23, 2016; 6:00 pm, ESPNews | | Temple | W 74–55 | 19–9 (11–5) | Reynolds Center (4,827); Tulsa, OK |
| February 28, 2016; 3:00 pm, ESPNU | | at Memphis | L 82–92 | 19–10 (11–6) | FedEx Forum; Memphis, TN |
| March 5, 2016; 4:00 pm, ESPNews | | South Florida | W 84–74 | 20–10 (12–6) | Reynolds Center (6,524); Tulsa, OK |
American Athletic Conference tournament
| March 11, 2016; 8:00 pm, ESPNU | (3) | vs. (6) Memphis; Quarterfinals | L 67–89 | 20–11 | Amway Center (7,218); Orlando, FL |
NCAA tournament
| March 16, 2016*; 8:10 pm, truTV | (11 E) | vs. (11 E) Michigan; First Four | L 62–67 | 20–12 | UD Arena (12,582); Dayton, OH |
*Non-conference game. ^{#}Rankings from AP Poll. (#) Tournament seedings in parentheses. E=East Region. All times are in Central Time.
