= Amida Brimah =

Ghanaian basketball player (born 1994)

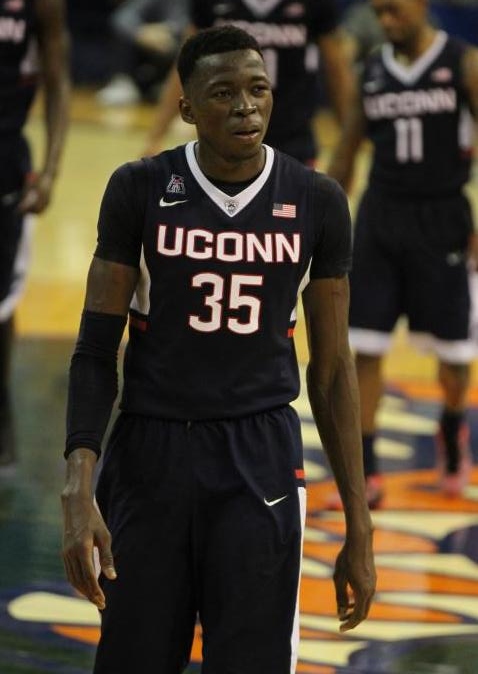
- Brimah with the UConn Huskies in 2015

No. 37 – Covirán Granada
- Position: Center
- League: Liga ACB

Personal information
- Born: February 11, 1994 (age 32) Accra, Ghana
- Listed height: 6 ft 10 in (2.08 m)
- Listed weight: 230 lb (104 kg)

Career information
- High school: Archbishop Coleman F. Carroll (Miami, Florida)
- College: UConn (2013–2017)
- NBA draft: 2017: undrafted
- Playing career: 2017–present

Career history
- 2017–2019: Austin Spurs
- 2018: Partizan
- 2021: Fort Wayne Mad Ants
- 2021: Indiana Pacers
- 2021–2022: Mets de Guaynabo
- 2021–2022: Oostende
- 2022–2023: JL Bourg
- 2023–2024: Grand Rapids Gold
- 2024: Santa Cruz Warriors
- 2024: Mets de Guaynabo
- 2024: Manresa
- 2024–2025: Valencia
- 2025: Estudiantes
- 2025–present: Covirán Granada

Career highlights
- NBA G League champion (2018); NBA G League All-Defensive Team (2018); NBA G League blocks leader (2021); NBA G League all-time blocks leader; NCAA champion (2014); AAC Defensive Player of the Year (2015)
- Stats at NBA.com
- Stats at Basketball Reference

Amida Abiola Brimah (born February 11, 1994) is a Ghanaian professional basketball player for Covirán Granada of the Spanish Liga ACB. He played college basketball for the UConn Huskies.

== College career ==
Brimah was on the Huskies' 2013–14 NCAA Championship team. In the first round of the tournament, vs St. Joe's, UConn trailed 67–70 with 39 seconds remaining when Brimah rebounded a missed shot and converted a 3 point play to send the game to overtime; UConn ultimately won the game in overtime. Brimah's play was cited as a turning point in UConn's title run.

On December 15, 2014, he scored 40 points in a game against Coppin State, becoming the 11th Husky to do so. Brimah's 13-13 shooting led Connecticut to a 106–85 victory. At the conclusion of the season, he was named honorable mention all conference.

In his career at UConn, Brimah averaged 6.7 points and 4.5 rebounds.

== Professional career ==
=== Austin Spurs (2017–2018) ===
After going undrafted in 2017 NBA draft, Brimah signed with the Chicago Bulls to play in the 2017 Summer League. On September 25, 2017, Brimah was included in the training camp roster of the San Antonio Spurs. He was later on waived on October 12, 2017. On November 2, 2017, Brimah was included in the 2017–18 opening night roster for Austin Spurs.

=== Partizan (2018) ===
On April 13, 2018, Brimah signed with Partizan.

=== Return to Austin (2018–2019) ===
On September 18, 2018, Brimah signed an Exhibit 10 deal with the San Antonio Spurs, but was waived by the Spurs three days later. On October 22, 2018, Brimah was included in the training camp roster of the Austin Spurs, and on October 31, Brimah was included in Austin's opening night roster.

On August 30, 2019, the Fort Wayne Mad Ants had acquired the returning right of Brimah from the Austin Spurs in exchange for the returning right to Jordan Barnett. On September 3, 2019, Brimah signed an Exhibit 10 contract with the Indiana Pacers. On October 16, 2019, Brimah was waived by the Indiana Pacers.

=== Fort Wayne Mad Ants / Indiana Pacers (2021) ===
On November 21, 2020, Brimah signed an exhibit-10 contract with the Pacers, re-joining the team. On December 18, 2020, Brimah was waived by the Pacers. On January 11, 2021, he was included in the single site season roster by the Fort Wayne Mad Ants, where he played 10 games and averaged 8.0 points, 8.5 rebounds and 2.8 blocks in 23.5 minutes.

On April 23, 2021, Brimah signed a two-way deal with the Pacers. He played five games for the Pacers, averaging 2.6 points and 1.6 rebounds in 5.8 minutes per game. In 10 games for the G League Mad Ants, he averaged 8 points, 8.6 rebounds and 2.6 blocks per game. Brimah was waived shortly before training camp the next season.

=== Mets de Guaynabo (2021) ===
On September 9, 2021, Brimah signed with the Mets de Guaynabo of the Baloncesto Superior Nacional. In 22 games, he averaged 11.6 points, 9.6 rebounds and 3.0 blocks per game.

=== Filou Oostende (2021–2022) ===
On November 12, 2021, Brimah signed with Filou Oostende of the BNXT League and the Basketball Champions League. After an injury (broken foot) he is able to join his team for the finals of the play-offs. Filou Oostende can become for the 11th time in a row the national Belgian champions.

=== JL Bourg (2022–2023) ===
On November 8, 2022, Brimah signed with JL Bourg of the French LNB Pro A.

=== Grand Rapids Gold (2023–2024) ===
On October 13, 2023, Brimah signed with the Denver Nuggets, but was waived on October 18. On October 30, he joined the Grand Rapids Gold.

=== Santa Cruz Warriors (2024) ===
On January 8, 2024, Brimah was traded to the Santa Cruz Warriors. On March 28, he was waived by the Warriors.

=== Return to Guaynabo (2024) ===
On March 20, 2024, Brimah re-signed with the Mets de Guaynabo.

== Career statistics ==
Legend
GP	Games played	GS	Games started	MPG	Minutes per game
FG%	Field goal percentage	3P%	3-point field goal percentage	FT%	Free throw percentage
RPG	Rebounds per game	APG	Assists per game	SPG	Steals per game
BPG	Blocks per game	PPG	Points per game	**Bold**	Career high

=== NBA ===
==== Regular season ====
Year	Team	GP	GS	MPG	FG%	3P%	FT%	RPG	APG	SPG	BPG	PPG
2020–21	Indiana	5	0	5.8	.625	—	1.000	1.6	.2	.0	1.0	2.6
Career		5	0	5.8	.625	—	1.000	1.6	.2	.0	1.0	2.6

=== College ===
Year	Team	GP	GS	MPG	FG%	3P%	FT%	RPG	APG	SPG	BPG	PPG
2013–14	Connecticut	**40**	17	16.2	.640	.000	.574	3.0	**.3**	.1	2.3	4.1
2014–15	Connecticut	35	**35**	**26.3**	**.674**	.000	.650	4.4	.2	**.2**	**3.5**	**9.1**
2015–16	Connecticut	25	17	21.0	.663	.000	**.824**	4.6	.1	**.2**	2.7	6.5
2016–17	Connecticut	33	33	24.7	.573	.000	.623	**6.1**	.2	**.2**	2.6	7.6
Career		133	102	21.9	.637	.000	.644	4.5	.2	.2	2.8	6.7

== See also ==
- List of foreign basketball players in Serbia
