= 2016 American Athletic Conference men's basketball tournament =

- Tournament logo
- Classification: Division I
- Season: 2015–16
- Teams: 10
- Site: Amway Center; Orlando, Florida
- Champions: Connecticut (1st title)
- Winning coach: Kevin Ollie (1st title)
- Attendance: 38,871
- Television: ESPN, ESPN2, ESPNU, ESPNews

2015–16 American Athletic Conference men's basketball standings
	Conf.				Overall
Team	W		L	PCT	W		L	PCT
Temple	14	–	4	.778	21	–	12	.636
No. 24 SMU^{*}	13	–	5	.722	25	–	5	.833
Houston	12	–	6	.667	22	–	10	.688
Cincinnati	12	–	6	.667	22	–	11	.667
Tulsa	12	–	6	.667	20	–	12	.625
UConn †	11	–	7	.611	25	–	11	.694
Memphis	8	–	10	.444	19	–	15	.559
UCF	6	–	12	.333	12	–	18	.400
East Carolina	4	–	14	.222	12	–	20	.375
South Florida	4	–	14	.222	8	–	25	.242
Tulane	3	–	15	.167	12	–	22	.353
^{*} Ineligible for postseason due to postseason ban † American Athletic Conference tournament Champions; Rankings from AP poll

The 2016 American Athletic Conference men's basketball tournament was the conference tournament for the American Athletic Conference during the 2015–16 NCAA Division I men's basketball season. It was held March 10–13, 2016, at the Amway Center in Orlando, Florida. The Tournament was won by the #5 Seed Connecticut Huskies, who beat the #6 Seed Memphis Tigers in the final by a score of 72–58.

== Seeds ==
Teams are seeded by conference record, with a ties broken by record between the tied teams followed by record against the regular-season champion, if necessary. With SMU ineligible for postseason play, the top six seeds will receive first round byes.

Seed	School	Conference	Tiebreaker
1	Temple	14–4	
2	Houston	12–6	1–0 vs Memphis
3	Tulsa	12–6	0–1 vs Memphis
4	Cincinnati	12–6	0–2 vs Temple
5	Connecticut	11–7	
6	Memphis	8–10	
7	UCF	6–12	
8	East Carolina	4–14	1–1 vs. Temple
9	South Florida	4–14	0–2 vs. Temple
10	Tulane	3–15	

== Schedule ==
All tournament games are nationally televised on an ESPN network:

Session	Game	Time*	Matchup^{#}	Television	Attendance
First round – Thursday, March 10
1	1	3:30 pm	#9 South Florida 71 vs. #8 East Carolina 66	ESPNU	8,723
1	2	6:00 pm	#10 Tulane 65 vs. #7 UCF 63	ESPNews	8,723
Quarterfinals – Friday, March 11
2	3	12:00 pm	#9 South Florida 62 vs. #1 Temple 79	ESPN2	7,475
2	4	2:00 pm	#5 Connecticut 104 vs. #4 Cincinnati 97 (4OT)	ESPN2	7,475
3	5	7:00 pm	#10 Tulane 72 vs. #2 Houston 69	ESPNU	7,218
3	6	9:00 pm	#6 Memphis 89 vs. #3 Tulsa 67	ESPNU	7,218
Semifinals – Saturday, March 12
4	7	3:00 pm	#5 Connecticut 77 vs. #1 Temple 62	ESPN2	7,465
4	8	5:00 pm	#10 Tulane 54 vs. #6 Memphis 74	ESPN2	7,465
Championship – Sunday, March 13
5	9	3:15 pm	#5 Connecticut 72 vs. #6 Memphis 58	ESPN	7,990
*Game times in ET. #-Rankings denote tournament seeding.

== Bracket ==
First round Thursday, March 10
8	East Carolina	66
9	South Florida	71
7	UCF	63
10	Tulane	65

Quarterfinals; Friday, March 11
1	Temple	79
9	South Florida	62
4	Cincinnati	97
5	Connecticut	104****
2	Houston	69
10	Tulane	72
3	Tulsa	67
6	Memphis	89

Semifinals; Saturday, March 12
1	Temple	62
5	Connecticut	77
10	Tulane	54
6	Memphis	74

Championship; Sunday, March 13
5	Connecticut	72
6	Memphis	58

* denotes overtime period
