= 2015–16 Cincinnati Bearcats men's basketball team =

American college basketball season

2015–16 Cincinnati Bearcats men's basketball

Barclays Center Classic champions

NCAA tournament, First Round
- Conference: American Athletic Conference
- Record: 22–11 (12–6 The American)
- Head coach: Mick Cronin (10th season)
- Assistant coaches: Larry Davis (10th season); Antwon Jackson (4th season); Darren Savino (6th season)
- Home arena: Fifth Third Arena

2015–16 American Athletic Conference men's basketball standings
	Conf.				Overall
Team	W		L	PCT	W		L	PCT
Temple	14	–	4	.778	21	–	12	.636
No. 24 SMU^{*}	13	–	5	.722	25	–	5	.833
Houston	12	–	6	.667	22	–	10	.688
Cincinnati	12	–	6	.667	22	–	11	.667
Tulsa	12	–	6	.667	20	–	12	.625
UConn †	11	–	7	.611	25	–	11	.694
Memphis	8	–	10	.444	19	–	15	.559
UCF	6	–	12	.333	12	–	18	.400
East Carolina	4	–	14	.222	12	–	20	.375
South Florida	4	–	14	.222	8	–	25	.242
Tulane	3	–	15	.167	12	–	22	.353
^{*} Ineligible for postseason due to postseason ban † American Athletic Conference tournament Champions; Rankings from AP poll

The 2015–16 Cincinnati Bearcats men's basketball team represented the University of Cincinnati during the 2015–16 NCAA Division I men's basketball season. The Bearcats, were led by tenth year head coach Mick Cronin, who returned full-time after taking a hiatus in December 2014. The Bearcats played their home games on Ed Jucker Court at Fifth Third Arena and were members of the American Athletic Conference. They finished the season with a record of 22–11, 12–6 in AAC play to finish in a tie for third place in conference. The Bearcats lost in the quarterfinals of the AAC tournament to UConn for the second consecutive year. They received an at-large bid as a #9 seed to the NCAA tournament. They lost in the First Round of the Tournament to Saint Joseph's.

== Previous season ==
The Bearcats finished the 2014–15 season with a record of 23–11, 13–5 in AAC play to finish in a tie for third place in conference. They lost in the quarterfinals of the AAC tournament to UConn. They received an at-large bid as a #8 seed to the NCAA tournament where they defeated #9 seeded Purdue in the Second Round before losing to #1 ranked Kentucky in the Third Round.

== Offseason ==
=== Departing players ===
Name	Number	Pos.	Height	Weight	Year	Hometown	Notes
Deshaun Morman	1	G	6'3'"	190	RS Freshman	Richmond, Virginia	Transferred to Towson
Ge’Lawn Guyn	14	G	6'2'"	185	Senior	Lexington, Kentucky	Left team; transferred to East Tennessee State
Jermaine Sanders	15	G	6'5'"	210	Senior	Far Rockaway, New York	Graduated
Jamaree Strickland	32	C	6'10'"	270	RS Freshman	Oakland, California	Transferred to Arizona Western College (mid-season)
Rob Blissitt Jr.	42	G	6'3'"	175	Sophomore	Markham, Illinois	Walk-on; did not return

=== Incoming transfers ===
Name	Pos.	Height	Weight	Year	Hometown	Notes
Kyle Washington	C	6'9"	170	Junior	Champlin, MN	Transferred from NC State. Under NCAA transfer rules, Washington will have to sit out for the 2015–16 season. Will have two years of remaining eligibility.

=== Recruiting class of 2015 ===
College recruiting information
Name	Hometown	School	Height	Weight	Commit date
Jacob Evans; G	Baton Rouge, LA	St. Michael High School	6 ft 5 in (1.96 m)	190 lb (86 kg)	Oct 14, 2013
Jacob Evans; G	Recruit ratings: Scout: Rivals: 247Sports: (80)				
Justin Jenifer; G	Gwynn Oak, MD	Milford Mill Academy	5 ft 9 in (1.75 m)	185 lb (84 kg)	Jun 9, 2014
Justin Jenifer; G	Recruit ratings: Scout: Rivals: 247Sports: (80)				
Trevon Scott; F	Darien, GA	McIntosh County Academy	6 ft 7 in (2.01 m)	200 lb (91 kg)	Sep 15, 2014
Trevon Scott; F	Recruit ratings: Scout: Rivals: 247Sports: (78)				
Overall recruit ranking: Scout: NR Rivals: NR 247Sports: 53 ESPN: NR
Note: In many cases, Scout, Rivals, 247Sports, On3, and ESPN may conflict in their listings of height and weight.; In these cases, the average was taken. ESPN grades are on a 100-point scale.; Sources: "Cincinnati 2015 Player Commits". ESPN.; "2015 Team Ranking". Rivals.

=== Recruiting class of 2016 ===
College recruiting information (2016)
Name	Hometown	School	Height	Weight	Commit date
Nysier Brooks; C	Burlington, New Jersey	Life Center Academy	6 ft 9 in (2.06 m)	200 lb (91 kg)	Jun 30, 2015
Nysier Brooks; C	Recruit ratings: Rivals: 247Sports: (79)				
Jarron Cumberland; SG	Wilmington, Ohio	Wilmington High School	6 ft 4 in (1.93 m)	215 lb (98 kg)	Jul 1, 2015
Jarron Cumberland; SG	Recruit ratings: Rivals: 247Sports: (85)				
Overall recruit ranking: Scout: NR Rivals: NR 247Sports: 62 ESPN: 40
Note: In many cases, Scout, Rivals, 247Sports, On3, and ESPN may conflict in their listings of height and weight.; In these cases, the average was taken. ESPN grades are on a 100-point scale.; Sources: "ESPN". ESPN.; "2016 Team Ranking". Rivals.

== Roster ==
2015–16 Cincinnati Bearcats men's basketball team
Players
Coaches

Pos.	#	Name	Height	Weight	Year	Previous school	Hometown
F	0	Quadri Moore	6 ft 8 in (2.03 m)	230 lb (104 kg)	So	Linden High School	Linden, New Jersey
G	1	Jacob Evans	6 ft 6 in (1.98 m)	210 lb (95 kg)	Fr	St. Michael the Archangel High School	Baton Rouge, Louisiana
F	2	Octavius Ellis (C)	6 ft 10 in (2.08 m)	235 lb (107 kg)	Sr	Trinity Valley CC	Memphis, Tennessee
F	3	Justin Jenifer	5 ft 10 in (1.78 m)	175 lb (79 kg)	Fr	Milford Mill Academy	Gwynn Oak, Maryland
G	10	Troy Caupain	6 ft 4 in (1.93 m)	205 lb (93 kg)	Jr	Cosby High School	Midlothian, Virginia
F	11	Gary Clark	6 ft 7 in (2.01 m)	235 lb (107 kg)	So	Clayton High School	Clayton, North Carolina
F	13	Trevon Scott (redshirt)	6 ft 7 in (2.01 m)	220 lb (100 kg)	Fr	McIntosh County Academy	Darien, Georgia
G	21	Farad Cobb (C)	6 ft 1 in (1.85 m)	165 lb (75 kg)	Sr	Northwest Florida SC	West Palm Beach, Florida
C	22	Coreontae DeBerry	6 ft 10 in (2.08 m)	270 lb (122 kg)	Sr	Hutchinson CC	Holland, Michigan
F	24	Shaq Thomas	6 ft 7 in (2.01 m)	210 lb (95 kg)	RS Sr	NIA Prep	Paterson, New Jersey
G	25	Kevin Johnson	6 ft 3 in (1.91 m)	185 lb (84 kg)	Jr	Summit Country Day School	Cincinnati, Ohio
F	32	Kyle Washington (redshirt)	6 ft 9 in (2.06 m)	225 lb (102 kg)	Jr	NC State	Champlin, Minnesota
F	45	Zack Tobler (W)	6 ft 5 in (1.96 m)	230 lb (104 kg)	Jr	Covington Catholic High School	Fort Mitchell, Kentucky

Head coach

- Mick Cronin (Cincinnati)

Assistant coach(es)

- Larry Davis (Asbury)
- Darren Savino (NJCU)
- Antwon Jackson (Pikeville)

Legend

- (C) Team captain
- (S) Suspended
- (I) Ineligible
- (W) Walk-on
- Injured
- Current redshirt

Roster
Last update: 15 May 2020

=== Depth chart ===
Pos.	Starting 5	Bench 1	Bench 2
C	Octavius Ellis	Coreontae DeBerry
PF	Gary Clark	Quadri Moore	Zack Tobler
SF	Shaq Thomas	Jacob Evans
SG	Farad Cobb	Kevin Johnson
PG	Troy Caupain	Justin Jenifer

== Schedule ==
Date time, TV	Rank^{#}	Opponent^{#}	Result	Record	Site (attendance) city, state
Exhibition
November 3, 2015*; 7:00pm		Grand Valley State	W 93–63		Fifth Third Arena (4,404); Cincinnati, OH
November 7, 2015*; 12:00pm		Bellarmine	W 81–60		Fifth Third Arena (4,507); Cincinnati, OH
Non-conference regular season
November 13, 2015*; 7:00pm, ESPN3		Western Carolina	W 97–72	1–0	Fifth Third Arena (7,213); Cincinnati, OH
November 15, 2015*; 2:00pm, FSOH/ESPN3		Robert Morris	W 106–44	2–0	Fifth Third Arena (6,292); Cincinnati, OH
November 18, 2015*; 7:00pm, ESPN3		at Bowling Green	W 83–50	3–0	Stroh Center (3,411); Bowling Green, OH
November 22, 2015*; 1:00pm, FSOH/ESPN3		Arkansas–Pine Bluff; Barclays Center Classic	W 99–50	4–0	Fifth Third Arena (6,083); Cincinnati, OH
November 24, 2015*; 7:00pm, FSOH/ESPN3	No. 24	Southeastern Louisiana; Barclays Center Classic	W 64–49	5–0	Fifth Third Arena (6,824); Cincinnati, OH
November 27, 2015*; 6:30pm, ASN/ESPN3	No. 24	vs. Nebraska; Barclays Center Classic semifinals	W 65–61	6–0	Barclays Center; Brooklyn, NY
November 28, 2015*; 2:30pm, ASN/ESPN3	No. 24	vs. George Washington; Barclays Center Classic Championship	W 61–56	7–0	Barclays Center; Brooklyn, NY
December 2, 2015*; 7:00pm, CBSSN	No. 17	Butler	L 76–78	7–1	Fifth Third Arena (11,125); Cincinnati, OH
December 6, 2015*; 5:30pm, ASN/ESPN3	No. 17	Morgan State	W 87–66	8–1	Fifth Third Arena (6,126); Cincinnati, OH
December 12, 2015*; 5:30pm, FOX	No. 23	at No. 12 Xavier; Crosstown Shootout	L 55–65	8–2	Cintas Center (10,617); Cincinnati, OH
December 15, 2015*; 7:00pm, ESPNU	No. 23	Norfolk State	W 75–59	9–2	Fifth Third Arena (6,215); Cincinnati, OH
December 19, 2015*; 4:00pm, CBSSN	No. 23	at VCU	W 69–63	10–2	Siegel Center (7,637); Richmond, VA
December 22, 2015*; 7:00pm, ESPN2	No. 22	No. 11 Iowa State	L 79–81	10–3	Fifth Third Arena (13,176); Cincinnati, OH
AAC Regular Season
December 29, 2015; 3:00pm, ESPN2	No. 22	Temple	L 70–77	10–4 (0–1)	Fifth Third Arena (10,029); Cincinnati, OH
January 2, 2016; 4:00pm, ESPNU	No. 22	Tulsa	W 76–57	11–4 (1–1)	Fifth Third Arena (10,102); Cincinnati, OH
January 7, 2016; 7:00pm, ESPN		at No. 15 SMU	L 57–59	11–5 (1–2)	Moody Coliseum (6,971); University Park, TX
January 10, 2016; 12:00pm, ESPNU		at South Florida	W 54–51	12–5 (2–2)	USF Sun Dome (3,062); Tampa, FL
January 13, 2016; 7:00pm, ESPNU		Houston	W 70–59	13–5 (3–2)	Fifth Third Arena (9,345); Cincinnati, OH
January 16, 2016; 12:00pm, ESPNU		at Temple	L 65–67 ^{2OT}	13–6 (3–3)	Liacouras Center (7,481); Philadelphia, PA
January 21, 2016; 7:00pm, ESPN2		Memphis; Rivalry	W 76–72	14–6 (4–3)	Fifth Third Arena (10,320); Cincinnati, OH
January 24, 2016; 12:00pm, ESPNU		Tulane	W 97–75	15–6 (5–3)	Fifth Third Arena (9,224); Cincinnati, OH
January 28, 2016; 7:00pm, ESPNU		at UConn	W 58–57	16–6 (6–3)	XL Center (13,242); Hartford, CT
February 4, 2016; 8:00pm, CBSSN		South Florida	W 88–57	17–6 (7–3)	Fifth Third Arena (9,116); Cincinnati, OH
February 6, 2016; 12:00pm, ESPN2		at Memphis; Rivalry	L 59–63	17–7 (7–4)	FedEx Forum (12,920); Memphis, TN
February 9, 2016; 7:00pm, ESPNews		at UCF	W 69–51	18–7 (8–4)	CFE Arena (4,143); Orlando, FL
February 13, 2016; 4:00pm, ESPNU		East Carolina	W 75–60	19–7 (9–4)	Fifth Third Arena (12,513); Cincinnati, OH
February 18, 2016; 9:00pm, CBSSN		at Tulsa	L 68–70 ^{OT}	19–8 (9–5)	Reynolds Center (4,402); Tulsa, OK
February 20, 2016; 4:00pm, ESPN2		UConn	W 65–60	20–8 (10–5)	Fifth Third Arena (13,176); Cincinnati, OH
February 27, 2016; 12:00pm, ESPNU		at East Carolina	W 65–56	21–8 (11–5)	Williams Arena (4,841); Greenville, NC
March 3, 2016; 9:00pm, CBSSN		at Houston	L 56–69	21–9 (11–6)	Hofheinz Pavilion (4,171); Houston, TX
March 6, 2016; 12:00pm, CBS		No. 24 SMU	W 61–54	22–9 (12–6)	Fifth Third Arena (13,176); Cincinnati, OH
AAC Tournament
March 11, 2016; 2:00pm, ESPN2	(4)	vs. (5) UConn; Quarterfinals	L 97–104 ^{4OT}	22–10	Amway Center (7,475); Orlando, FL
NCAA Tournament
March 18, 2016*; 9:57pm, truTV	(9 W)	vs. (8 W) Saint Joseph's; First Round	L 76–78	22–11	Spokane Arena (11,274); Spokane, WA
*Non-conference game. ^{#}Rankings from AP Poll. (#) Tournament seedings in parentheses. W=West Region. All times are in Eastern Time.

== Awards and milestones ==
=== American Athletic Conference honors ===
==== All-AAC Awards ====
- Defensive Player of the Year: Gary Clark

==== All-AAC First Team ====
- Troy Caupain

==== All-AAC Second Team ====
- Gary Clark

==== Player of the Week ====
- Week 3: Troy Caupain
- Week 17: Troy Caupain

==== Rookie of the Week ====
- Week 7: Jacob Evans
- Week 16: Jacob Evans

== Rankings ==
Ranking movements Legend: ██ Increase in ranking ██ Decrease in ranking RV = Received votes
	Week																				
Poll	Pre	1	2	3	4	5	6	7	8	9	10	11	12	13	14	15	16	17	18	19	Final
AP	RV	RV	24	17	23	23	22	22								RV	RV	RV	RV	RV	Not released
Coaches'	RV	RV	24	17	22	20	21	23											RV	RV	RV
