= 2012–13 Cincinnati Bearcats men's basketball team =

American college basketball season

2012–13 Cincinnati Bearcats men's basketball

Global Sports Classic champions

NCAA Tournament, Round of 64
- Conference: Big East Conference (1979–2013)
- Record: 22–12 (9–9 Big East)
- Head coach: Mick Cronin (7th season)
- Assistant coaches: Larry Davis (7th season); Antwon Jackson (1st season); Darren Savino (3rd season)
- Home arena: Fifth Third Arena

2012–13 Big East men's basketball standings
	Conf.				Overall
Team	W		L	PCT	W		L	PCT
No. 2 Louisville†**	14	–	4	.778	35	–	5	.875
No. 8 Georgetown	14	–	4	.778	25	–	7	.781
No. 15 Marquette	14	–	4	.778	26	–	9	.743
No. 20 Pittsburgh	12	–	6	.667	24	–	9	.727
No. 16 Syracuse	11	–	7	.611	30	–	10	.750
No. 23 Notre Dame	11	–	7	.611	25	–	10	.714
Villanova	10	–	8	.556	20	–	14	.588
Connecticut*	10	–	8	.556	20	–	10	.667
Cincinnati	9	–	9	.500	22	–	12	.647
Providence	9	–	9	.500	19	–	15	.559
St. John's	8	–	10	.444	17	–	16	.515
Rutgers	5	–	13	.278	15	–	16	.484
Seton Hall	3	–	15	.167	15	–	18	.455
South Florida	3	–	15	.167	12	–	19	.387
DePaul	2	–	16	.111	11	–	21	.344
† 2013 Big East tournament winner As of March 30, 2013; Rankings from AP Poll; *Ineligible for postseason play due to APR penalties.

The 2012–13 Cincinnati Bearcats men's basketball team represented the University of Cincinnati during the 2012–13 NCAA Division I men's basketball season. The Bearcats, led by seventh year head coach Mick Cronin, played their home games at Fifth Third Arena and were members of the Big East Conference.

== Offseason ==
=== Departing players ===
Name	Number	Pos.	Height	Weight	Year	Hometown	Notes
Octavius Ellis	2	F	6'9"	210	Freshmen	Memphis, Tennessee	Dismissed, transferred to Trinity Valley CC
Dion Dixon	3	G	6'3"	195	Senior	Chicago, Illinois	Graduated
Yancy Gates	34	F	6'9"	260	Senior	Cincinnati, Ohio	Graduated

=== Incoming transfers ===
Name	Pos.	Height	Weight	Year	Hometown	Notes
Titus Rubles	F	6'7"	220	Junior	Dallas, TX	Junior college transferred from Blinn College
David Nyarsuk	C	7'1"	230	Junior	Juba, South Sudan	Junior college transferred from Mountain State University

=== Recruiting class of 2013 ===
College recruiting information (2013)
Name	Hometown	School	Height	Weight	Commit date
Troy Caupain; SG	Midlothian, Virginia	Cosby High School	6 ft 3 in (1.91 m)	180 lb (82 kg)	Jun 8, 2012
Troy Caupain; SG	Recruit ratings: Scout: Rivals: 247Sports: (77)				
Kevin Johnson; SG	Cincinnati, Ohio	Summit Country Day School	6 ft 2 in (1.88 m)	175 lb (79 kg)	Jun 11, 2012
Kevin Johnson; SG	Recruit ratings: Scout: Rivals: 247Sports: (78)				
Jamaree Strickland; C	Oakland, California	Queen City Prep (NC)	6 ft 9 in (2.06 m)	230 lb (100 kg)	Nov 16, 2012
Jamaree Strickland; C	Recruit ratings: Scout: Rivals: 247Sports: (67)				
Deshaun Moorman; SG	Brandon, Florida	Faith Baptist School	6 ft 4 in (1.93 m)	190 lb (86 kg)	Nov 16, 2012
Deshaun Moorman; SG	Recruit ratings: Scout: Rivals: 247Sports: (72)				
Jermaine Lawrence; PF	Sparta, New Jersey	Pope John XXIII Regional High School	6 ft 9 in (2.06 m)	200 lb (91 kg)	Feb 3, 2013
Jermaine Lawrence; PF	Recruit ratings: Scout: Rivals: 247Sports: (88)				
Overall recruit ranking: 247Sports: 26 ESPN: 24
Note: In many cases, Scout, Rivals, 247Sports, On3, and ESPN may conflict in their listings of height and weight.; In these cases, the average was taken. ESPN grades are on a 100-point scale.; Sources: "Cincinnati 2013 Player Commits". ESPN.; "2013 Team Ranking". Rivals.

== Roster ==
2012–13 Cincinnati Bearcats men's basketball team
Players
Coaches

Pos.	#	Name	Height	Weight	Year	Previous school	Hometown
G	0	Jeremiah Davis III (injured) (redshirt)	6 ft 3 in (1.91 m)	204 lb (93 kg)	So	Huntington Prep	Muncie, Indiana
G	1	Cashmere Wright (C)	6 ft 0 in (1.83 m)	178 lb (81 kg)	RS Sr	Urban Christian Academy	Savannah, Georgia
F	2	Titus Rubles	6 ft 7 in (2.01 m)	207 lb (94 kg)	Jr	Blinn College	Dallas, Texas
F	3	Shaquille Thomas	6 ft 7 in (2.01 m)	177 lb (80 kg)	RS Fr	NIA Prep	Paterson, New Jersey
F	5	Justin Jackson	6 ft 8 in (2.03 m)	213 lb (97 kg)	Jr	Arlington Country Day School	Cocoa Beach, Florida
G	10	Alex Eppensteiner (W)	6 ft 4 in (1.93 m)	190 lb (86 kg)	Sr	Elder High School	Cincinnati, Ohio
C	13	Cheikh Mbodj	6 ft 10 in (2.08 m)	236 lb (107 kg)	Sr	Grayson College	Dakar, Senegal
G	14	Ge'Lawn Guyn	6 ft 2 in (1.88 m)	174 lb (79 kg)	So	South Kent Prep	Georgetown, Kentucky
F	15	Jermaine Sanders	6 ft 5 in (1.96 m)	226 lb (103 kg)	So	Rice High School	Far Rockaway, New York
G/F	23	Sean Kilpatrick	6 ft 4 in (1.93 m)	221 lb (100 kg)	RS Jr	Notre Dame Prep	White Plains, New York
F	24	Kelvin Gaines	6 ft 10 in (2.08 m)	227 lb (103 kg)	RS So	Arlington Country Day School	Ocala, Florida
C	33	David Nyarsuk	7 ft 1 in (2.16 m)	230 lb (104 kg)	Jr	Mountain State University	Juba, South Sudan
F	44	JaQuon Parker (C)	6 ft 3 in (1.91 m)	198 lb (90 kg)	Sr	King's Fork High School	Suffolk, Virginia

Head coach

- Mick Cronin (Cincinnati)

Assistant coach(es)

- Larry Davis (Asbury)
- Darren Savino (NJCU)
- Antwon Jackson (Pikeville)

Legend

- (C) Team captain
- (S) Suspended
- (I) Ineligible
- (W) Walk-on
- Injured
- Current redshirt

Roster
Last update: 15 May 2020

=== Depth chart ===
Pos.	Starting 5	Bench 1	Bench 2
C	Cheikh Mbodj	David Nyarsuk
PF	Justin Jackson	Titus Rubles	Kelvin Gaines
SF	JaQuon Parker	Shaq Thomas
SG	Sean Kilpatrick	Jermaine Sanders	Alex Eppensteiner
PG	Cashmere Wright	Ge'Lawn Guyn	Jeremiah Davis III

== Schedule and results ==
Date time, TV	Rank^{#}	Opponent^{#}	Result	Record	Site (attendance) city, state
Exhibition
October 29, 2012*; 7:00pm	No. 24	Grand Valley State	W 80–60	–	Fifth Third Arena (5,375); Cincinnati, OH
November 5, 2012*; 7:00pm	No. 24	Bellarmine	W 86–51	–	Fifth Third Arena (5,457); Cincinnati, OH
Non-conference regular season
November 11, 2012*; 2:00pm, FSOH	No. 24	Tennessee-Martin	W 80–57	1–0	Fifth Third Arena (5,728); Cincinnati, OH
November 13, 2012*; 7:00pm, ESPN3	No. 24	Mississippi Valley State	W 102–60	2–0	Fifth Third Arena (5,617); Cincinnati, OH
November 18, 2012*; 2:00pm, FSOH	No. 24	North Carolina A&T; Global Sports Classic	W 93–39	3–0	Fifth Third Arena (5,582); Cincinnati, OH
November 20, 2012*; 7:00pm, FSOH	No. 22	Campbell; Global Sports Classic	W 91–72	4–0	Fifth Third Arena (5,924); Cincinnati, OH
November 23, 2012*; 6:30pm, CBSSN	No. 22	vs. Iowa State; Global Sports Classic Semifinals	W 78–70	5–0	Thomas & Mack Center (16,730); Paradise, NV
November 24, 2012*; 10:30pm, CBSSN	No. 22	vs. Oregon; Global Sports Classic Championship	W 77–66	6–0	Thomas & Mack Center (13,954); Paradise, NV
December 1, 2012*; 3:00pm, ESPN2	No. 17	Alabama; SEC–Big East Challenge	W 58–56	7–0	Fifth Third Arena (10,155); Cincinnati, OH
December 6, 2012*; 7:00pm, FSOH	No. 11	Arkansas–Little Rock	W 87–53	8–0	Fifth Third Arena (6,127); Cincinnati, OH
December 8, 2012*; 2:00pm, FSOH/ESPN3	No. 11	Maryland–Eastern Shore	W 92–60	9–0	Fifth Third Arena (6,423); Cincinnati, OH
December 15, 2012*; 2:00pm, CBSSN	No. 11	vs. Marshall	W 72–56	10–0	Charleston Civic Center (5,432); Charleston, WV
December 19, 2012*; 7:00pm, ESPN2	No. 11	vs. Xavier; Crosstown Classic	W 60–45	11–0	U.S. Bank Arena (14,528); Cincinnati, OH
December 22, 2012*; 4:00pm, FSOH	No. 11	Wright State	W 68–58	12–0	Fifth Third Arena (9,248); Cincinnati, OH
December 27, 2012*; 9:00pm, ESPN2	No. 8	New Mexico	L 54–55	12–1	Fifth Third Arena (10,627); Cincinnati, OH
Big East Regular Season
December 31, 2012; 12:00pm, ESPN2	No. 14	at No. 24 Pittsburgh	W 70–61	13–1 (1–0)	Petersen Events Center (12,510); Pittsburgh, PA
January 5, 2013; 4:00pm, ESPNU	No. 14	St. John's	L 52–53	13–2 (1–1)	Fifth Third Arena (8,142); Cincinnati, OH
January 7, 2013; 6:30pm, ESPN2	No. 21	No. 17 Notre Dame	L 60–66	13–3 (1–2)	Fifth Third Arena (10,293); Cincinnati, OH
January 12, 2013; 8:00pm, BIG EAST Network/FSOH/ESPN3	No. 21	at Rutgers	W 68–58	14–3 (2–2)	The RAC (5,560); Piscataway, NJ
January 15, 2013; 8:30pm, BIG EAST Network/FSOH/ESPN3		at DePaul	W 75–70	15–3 (3–2)	Allstate Arena (8,120); Rosemont, IL
January 19, 2013; 7:00pm, ESPNU		No. 25 Marquette	W 71–69 ^{OT}	16–3 (4–2)	Fifth Third Arena (12,812); Cincinnati, OH
January 21, 2013; 3:30pm, ESPN	No. 21	at No. 3 Syracuse	L 55–57	16–4 (4–3)	Carrier Dome (24,281); Syracuse, NY
January 30, 2013; 7:00pm, BIG EAST Network/FSOH/ESPN3	No. 24	Rutgers	W 62–54	17–4 (5–3)	Fifth Third Arena (11,024); Cincinnati, OH
February 2, 2013; 11:00am, ESPNU	No. 24	at Seton Hall	W 65–59	18–4 (6–3)	Prudential Center (6,961); Newark, NJ
February 6, 2013; 7:00pm, BIG EAST Network/FSOH/ESPN3	No. 17	at Providence	L 50–54	18–5 (6–4)	Dunkin' Donuts Center (7,837); Providence, RI
February 9, 2013; 6:00pm, ESPN	No. 17	No. 23 Pittsburgh	L 52–62	18–6 (6–5)	Fifth Third Arena (12,478); Cincinnati, OH
February 12, 2013; 8:00pm, BIG EAST Network/FSOH/ESPN3		Villanova	W 68–50	19–6 (7–5)	Fifth Third Arena (9,534); Cincinnati, OH
February 15, 2013; 9:00pm, ESPN		No. 15 Georgetown	L 55–62	19–7 (7–6)	Fifth Third Arena (12,842); Cincinnati, OH
February 21, 2013; 7:00pm, ESPN		at Connecticut	L 66–73 ^{OT}	19–8 (7–7)	XL Center (11,131); Hartford, CT
February 24, 2013; 2:00pm, CBS		at No. 25 Notre Dame	L 41–62	19–9 (7–8)	Edmund P. Joyce Center (9,149); Notre Dame, IN
March 2, 2013; 2:00pm, BIG EAST Network/WKRC/ESPN3		Connecticut	W 61–56	20–9 (8–8)	Fifth Third Arena (12,432); Cincinnati, OH
March 4, 2013; 7:00pm, ESPN		at No. 8 Louisville; Rivalry	L 51–67	20–10 (8–9)	KFC Yum! Center (22,739); Louisville, KY
March 9, 2013; 4:00pm, Big East Network/FSOH/ESPN3		South Florida	W 61–53 ^{OT}	21–10 (9–9)	Fifth Third Arena (11,572); Cincinnati, OH
Big East tournament
March 13, 2013; 12:00pm, ESPN	(9)	vs. (8) Providence; Second Round	W 61–44	22–10	Madison Square Garden (20,057); New York, NY
March 14, 2013; 12:00pm, ESPN	(9)	vs. (1) No. 5 Georgetown; Quarterfinals	L 43–62	22–11	Madison Square Garden (20,057); New York, NY
NCAA Tournament
March 22, 2013*; 3:00pm, CBS	(10 MW)	vs. (7 MW) Creighton; Second Round	L 63–67	22–12	Wells Fargo Center (20,125); Philadelphia, PA
*Non-conference game. ^{#}Rankings from AP Poll. (#) Tournament seedings in parentheses. All times are in Eastern Time. (#) during NCAA Tournament is seed with Region MW=Midwest.

== Awards and milestones ==
=== Big East Conference honors ===
==== All-Big East Second Team ====
- Sean Kilpatrick

==== Player of the Week ====
- Week 2: Sean Kilpatrick
- Week 10: Sean Kilpatrick

== Rankings ==
Ranking movement Legend: ██ Improvement in ranking. ██ Decrease in ranking. ██ Not ranked the previous week. RV=Others receiving votes.
Poll	Pre	Wk 1	Wk 2	Wk 3	Wk 4	Wk 5	Wk 6	Wk 7	Wk 8	Wk 9	Wk 10	Wk 11	Wk 12	Wk 13	Wk 14	Wk 15	Wk 16	WK 17	Wk 18	Final
AP	24	24	24	22	17	11	11	11	8	14	21	RV	21	24	17					
Coaches	25	25	24	20	16	12	12	11	8	15	20	24	20	23	17					
