= 2019 NBA Summer League =

- League: National Basketball Association
- Sport: Basketball
- Duration: July 1–15
- Games: At least 5 games (including 4 preliminary games) for each team (as many as 7 games per team)
- Teams: Sacramento-4; Utah-4; Las Vegas-32
- TV partner(s): NBA TV & ESPN

Sacramento Summer League
- Season champions: Miami Heat
- Top scorer: Kendrick Nunn

Utah Jazz Summer League
- Season champions: San Antonio Spurs
- Top scorer: Tony Bradley

Las Vegas NBA Summer League
- Season champions: Memphis Grizzlies
- Runners-up: Minnesota Timberwolves
- Top seed: Boston Celtics
- Season MVP: Brandon Clarke (league); Brandon Clarke (championship game)

NBA Summer League seasons
- ← 2018 2021 →

The 2019 NBA Summer League was held at the Thomas and Mack Center and Cox Pavilion in Las Vegas, Nevada on the campus of University of Nevada, Las Vegas. It began on July 1 and ended on July 15. All 30 teams and two national teams, China and Croatia, participated. Teams competed in a tournament-style schedule in four preliminary games before seeding in a tournament; each team played at least five games and some teams played seven. The event concluded with the 2019 NBA Summer League Championship game on July 15.

== California Classic ==
The California Classic is an official summer league of the NBA. Six games were played from July 1 to 3, 2019, at the Golden 1 Center.

=== Teams ===
- Miami Heat
- Golden State Warriors
- Los Angeles Lakers
- Sacramento Kings

==== Day 1 ====
NBA TV

July 1
9:00 pm

Boxscore

Miami Heat 106, Los Angeles Lakers 79
Scoring by quarter: 30–20, 37–20, 19–14, 20–25
Pts: Herro 18; Rebs: Robinson 5 Asts: Robinson, Herro 4	Pts: Allen 13; Rebs: Norvell Jr. 7 Asts: Norvell Jr., Miller-McIntyre 3

Golden 1 Center, Sacramento, California
Referees: Mark Lindsay, Ben Taylor, Tre Maddox

NBA TV

July 1
11:00 pm

Boxscore

Golden State Warriors 77, Sacramento Kings 81
Scoring by quarter: 23–18, 9–23, 21–19, 24–21
Pts: Evans 18; Rebs: Fredette 7 Asts: Reed, Evans 3	Pts: Gabriel 22; Rebs: Gabriel 12; Asts: Christon 11

Golden 1 Center, Sacramento, California
Referees: Karl Lane, Tony Brown, Brent Barnaky

==== Day 2 ====
ESPN2

July 2
9:00 pm

Boxscore

Los Angeles Lakers 100, Golden State Warriors 90
Scoring by quarter: 24–25, 24–15, 28–24, 24–26
Pts: Norvell Jr. 20; Rebs: Cacok12; Asts: Young 7	Pts: Paschall 18; Rebs: Jones 8 Asts: Evans 4

Golden 1 Center, Sacramento, California
Referees: Mark Lindsay, Courtney Kirkland, Dedric Taylor

NBA TV

July 2
11:00 pm

Boxscore

Miami Heat 89, Sacramento Kings 88
Scoring by quarter: 17–21, 19–24, 27–26, 26–17
Pts: Maten 21; Rebs: Maten 9 Asts: Robinson 6	Pts: Thompson 18; Rebs: Mika 14; Asts: Christon, Robinson 5

Golden 1 Center, Sacramento, California
Referees: Tre Maddox, Ben Taylor, Tony Brown

==== Day 3 ====
NBA TV

July 3
3:00 pm

Boxscore

Miami Heat 73, Golden State Warriors 65
Scoring by quarter: 12–15, 18–23, 15–12, 28–15
Pts: Nunn 21; Rebs: Alexander 10; Asts: Nunn 3	Pts: Jones 15; Rebs: Jones 7 Asts: 4 players tied 2

Golden 1 Center, Sacramento, California
Referees: Karl Lane, Courtney Kirkland, Brent Barnaky

NBA TV

July 3
5:00 pm

Boxscore

Los Angeles Lakers 99, Sacramento Kings 97
Scoring by quarter: 22–23, 17–24, 24–28, 36–22
Pts: Howard 25; Rebs: Mathias, Perkins 7 Asts: Norvell Jr. 8	Pts: Gabriel 16; Rebs: Mika 12; Asts: Christon 6

Golden 1 Center, Sacramento, California
Referees: Mark Lindsay, Tre Maddox, Ben Taylor, Tony Brown, Dedric Taylor

==== Standings/seedings ====
#	Team	GP	W	L	PTS	Tiebreaker Notes
1	Miami Heat	3	3	0	7.0	
2	Los Angeles Lakers	3	2	1	4.0	
3	Sacramento Kings	3	1	2	6.0	
4	Golden State Warriors	3	0	3	7.0	

=== Statistical leaders ===
Points

Player	Team	PPG
Kendrick Nunn	Miami Heat	24.0
Tyler Herro	Miami Heat	19.0
Wenyen Gabriel	Sacramento Kings	19.0
Yante Maten	Miami Heat	18.5
Zach Norvell Jr.	Los Angeles Lakers	14.0

Rebounds

Player	Team	RPG
Wenyen Gabriel	Sacramento Kings	8.5
Yante Maten	Miami Heat	8.5
Damian Jones	Golden State Warriors	6.7
Jordan Caroline	Los Angeles Lakers	6.0
Duncan Robinson	Miami Heat	5.5

Assists

Player	Team	APG
Semaj Christon	Sacramento Kings	7.3
Duncan Robinson	Miami Heat	5.0
Joe Young	Los Angeles Lakers	4.5
Zach Norvell Jr.	Los Angeles Lakers	4.0
Jaron Johnson	Los Angeles Lakers	3.5

== Utah Jazz Summer League ==
The Utah Jazz Summer League is an official summer league of the NBA. Six games were played from July 1 to 3, 2019, at the Vivint Smart Home Arena.

=== Teams ===
- Cleveland Cavaliers
- Memphis Grizzlies
- San Antonio Spurs
- Utah Jazz

=== Utah Schedule ===
All times are in Mountain Daylight Time (UTC–6)

==== Day 1 ====
NBA TV

July 1
5:00 pm

Boxscore

San Antonio Spurs 97, Cleveland Cavaliers 89
Scoring by quarter: 19–19, 26–27, 27–19, 25–24
Pts: Walker IV 20; Rebs: Samanic, Walker IV 7 Asts: Morris 4	Pts: Windler 19; Rebs: Windler 6 Asts: Mitrou-Long 8

Vivint Smart Home Arena, Salt Lake City, Utah
Referees: Brett Nansel, Leroy Richardson, Marat Kogut

ESPN2

July 1
7:00 pm

Boxscore

Memphis Grizzlies 85, Utah Jazz 68
Scoring by quarter: 24–17, 20–18, 17–19, 24–14
Pts: Washburn, Watanabe 20; Rebs: Watanabe 9 Asts: Carter 4	Pts: Bradley 14; Rebs: Bradley 15; Asts: Wright-Foreman 3

Vivint Smart Home Arena, Salt Lake City, Utah
Referees: Justin Van Duyne, Haywoode Workman, Matt Boland

==== Day 2 ====
NBA TV

July 2
5:00 pm

Boxscore

Memphis Grizzlies 84, San Antonio Spurs 99
Scoring by quarter: 20–30, 24–29, 20–18, 20–22
Pts: Hannahs 20; Rebs: Hexom 9 Asts: Lee 7	Pts: Johnson 29; Rebs: 4 players tied 7 Asts: Magette 10

Vivint Smart Home Arena, Salt Lake City, Utah
Referees: Eric Dalen, Derek Richardson, CJ Washington

NBA TV

July 2
7:00 pm

Boxscore

Cleveland Cavaliers 71, Utah Jazz 86
Scoring by quarter: 21–24, 19–23, 11–18, 20–21
Pts: Mitrou-Long 17; Rebs: Windler 8 Asts: Windler 5	Pts: Bradley 26; Rebs: Bradley 16; Asts: Cousins 6

Vivint Smart Home Arena, Salt Lake City, Utah
Referees: Brett Nansel, Leroy Richardson, Marat Kogut

==== Day 3 ====
NBA TV

July 3
5:00 pm

Boxscore

Cleveland Cavaliers 68, Memphis Grizzlies 81
Scoring by quarter: 15–18, 18–19, 17–22, 18–22
Pts: Mitrou-Long 12; Rebs: Mitrou-Long 6 Asts: Wade 5	Pts: Evans 20; Rebs: Watanabe 9 Asts: Lee 7

Vivint Smart Home Arena, Salt Lake City, Utah
Referees: Justin Van Duyne, Haywoode Workman, Matt Boland

NBA TV

July 3
7:00 pm

Boxscore

San Antonio Spurs 81, Utah Jazz 84
Scoring by quarter: 13–27, 16–15, 31–28, 21–14
Pts: Waler IV 19; Rebs: Robinson 9 Asts: Magette 4	Pts: Oni 17; Rebs: Reed 16; Asts: Ferrari 3

Vivint Smart Home Arena, Salt Lake City, Utah
Referees: Eric Dalen, Derek Richardson, CJ Washington

==== Standings/seedings ====
#	Team	GP	W	L	PTS	Tiebreaker Notes
1	San Antonio Spurs	3	2	1	8.5	
2	Memphis Grizzlies	3	2	1	8.0	
3	Utah Jazz	3	2	1	6.0	
4	Cleveland Cavaliers	3	0	3	1.5	

=== Statistical leaders ===
Points

Player	Team	PPG
Tony Bradley	Utah Jazz	20.0
Lonnie Walker IV	San Antonio Spurs	19.5
Keldon Johnson	San Antonio Spurs	16.5
Yuta Watanabe	Memphis Grizzlies	16.0
Naz Mitrou-Long	Cleveland Cavaliers	15.0

Rebounds

Player	Team	RPG
Tony Bradley	Utah Jazz	15.5
Willie Reed	Utah Jazz	10.5
Yuta Watanabe	Memphis Grizzlies	9.0
Lonnie Walker IV	San Antonio Spurs	7.5
Thomas Robinson	San Antonio Spurs	6.3

Assists

Player	Team	APG
Josh Magette	San Antonio Spurs	5.7
Naz Mitrou-Long	Cleveland Cavaliers	4.0
Jevon Carter	Memphis Grizzlies	4.0
Darius Morris	San Antonio Spurs	4.0
Justin Wright-Foreman	Utah Jazz	3.5

== Las Vegas NBA Summer League ==
The Las Vegas NBA Summer League is an official summer league of the NBA. 83 games will be played from July 5 to 15, 2019, across two venues, the Thomas & Mack Center and Cox Pavilion, both located in Paradise, Nevada (near Las Vegas). Both the Chinese and Croatian men's basketball teams participated in the 2019 Las Vegas Summer League.

=== Teams ===
- Atlanta Hawks
- Boston Celtics
- Brooklyn Nets
- Chicago Bulls
- China
- Cleveland Cavaliers
- Charlotte Hornets
- Croatia
- Dallas Mavericks
- Detroit Pistons
- Denver Nuggets
- Golden State Warriors
- Houston Rockets
- Indiana Pacers
- Los Angeles Clippers
- Los Angeles Lakers
- Memphis Grizzlies
- Miami Heat
- Milwaukee Bucks
- Minnesota Timberwolves
- New Orleans Pelicans
- New York Knicks
- Oklahoma City Thunder
- Orlando Magic
- Philadelphia 76ers
- Phoenix Suns
- Portland Trail Blazers
- Sacramento Kings
- San Antonio Spurs
- Toronto Raptors
- Utah Jazz
- Washington Wizards

==== Day 1 ====
NBA TV

July 5
3:00 pm

Boxscore

Croatia 80, Detroit Pistons 96
Scoring by quarter: 19–20, 27–22, 15–25, 19–29
Pts: Šakić 17; Rebs: Čakarun 7 Asts: Rogić 5	Pts: Thomas 26; Rebs: Costello 8 Asts: Brown 7

Cox Pavilion, Paradise, Nevada
Referees: Evan Scott, Randy Richardson, Kelsey Reynolds

ESPN2

July 5
3:30 pm

Boxscore

Milwaukee Bucks 106, Philadelphia 76ers 107
Scoring by quarter: 19–32, 24–28, 28–27, 35–20
Pts: Landale 25; Rebs: Landale 10; Asts: Bryant 8	Pts: Shayok 19; Rebs: Koumadje, Pelle 7 Asts: Milton 7

Thomas & Mack Center, Paradise, Nevada
Referees: John Conley, Danielle Scott, Clare Aubry

NBA TV

July 5
5:00 pm

Boxscore

Minnesota Timberwolves 85, Cleveland Cavaliers 75
Scoring by quarter: 18–21, 17–25, 29–14, 21–15
Pts: Bates-Diop 17; Rebs: Martin 11; Asts: Okogie 4	Pts: Windler 15; Rebs: Windler 8 Asts: Mitrou-Long 6

Cox Pavilion, Paradise, Nevada
Referees: Nate Green, Chance Moore, Teresa Stuck

ESPNU

July 5
5:30 pm

Boxscore

Miami Heat 103, China 62
Scoring by quarter: 27–13, 32–12, 29–19, 15–18
Pts: Herro 23; Rebs: Silva 10; Asts: Nunn, Herro 4	Pts: Wang 12; Rebs: Wang 14; Asts: Fang, Wang 2

Thomas & Mack Center, Paradise, Nevada
Referees: Jenna Schroeder, Angelica Suffren, Cheryl Flores

NBA TV

July 5
7:00 pm

Boxscore

Dallas Mavericks 96, Brooklyn Nets 92
Scoring by quarter: 23–20, 27–19, 25–34, 21–19
Pts: Cleveland 22; Rebs: Baba 6 Asts: Reaves 5	Pts: Allen 19; Rebs: Allen, Hands 8 Asts: Pinson 6

Cox Pavilion, Paradise, Nevada
Referees: John Butler, Dannica Mosher, Omar Bermudez

ESPN

July 5
7:30 pm

Boxscore

Los Angeles Lakers 76, Chicago Bulls 96
Scoring by quarter: 14–29, 26–21, 23–20, 13–26
Pts: Norvell Jr. 15; Rebs: Cacok 10; Asts: Norvell Jr. 5	Pts: Gafford 21; Rebs: Gafford 10; Asts: Lemon Jr. 5

Thomas & Mack Center, Paradise, Nevada
Referees: Charles Watson, Kelly Broomfield, Intae Hwang

NBA TV

July 5
9:00 pm

Boxscore

Charlotte Hornets 93, Golden State Warriors 85
Scoring by quarter: 29–27, 18–21, 18–19, 28–18
Pts: Bacon 25; Rebs: Meeks 8 Asts: Hicks 5	Pts: Poole 15; Rebs: Smailagić 7 Asts: Evans 6

Cox Pavilion, Paradise, Nevada
Referees: Kevin Fahy, Ashley Gilpin, Ken Jones

ESPN

July 5
9:30 pm

Boxscore

New York Knicks 74, New Orleans Pelicans 80
Scoring by quarter: 32–23, 24–26, 13–31, 5–0
Game halted due to earthquake.
Pts: Trier 21; Rebs: Robinson 10; Asts: Trier 4	Pts: Jackson 30; Rebs: Bigby-Williams 10; Asts: Williams 6

Thomas & Mack Center, Paradise, Nevada
Referees: Suyash Mehta, Toni Patillo, Lauren Niemiera

NBA TV

July 5
11:00 pm

Boxscore

Orlando Magic 75, San Antonio Spurs 59
Scoring by quarter: 30–17, 29–20, 16–22, 0–0
Game halted due to earthquake.
Pts: McCree 16; Rebs: Davis 6 Asts: Gaddy 5	Pts: Walker IV 28; Rebs: Moore 6 Asts: Magette 5

Cox Pavilion, Paradise, Nevada
Referees: Andy Nagy, Issac Barnett, Stacie Blow

ESPN

July 5
11:30 pm

Phoenix Suns vs. Denver Nuggets
Game cancelled due to earthquake

Thomas & Mack Center, Paradise, Nevada
Referees: No referees assigned

==== Day 2 ====
NBA TV

July 6
3:00 pm

Boxscore

Oklahoma City Thunder 66, Utah Jazz 78
Scoring by quarter: 15–20, 14–18, 21–23, 16–17
Pts: Diallo 20; Rebs: Hervey 12; Asts: Grantham, Evans 3	Pts: Bradley 19; Rebs: Bradley 14; Asts: Three Players tied for 3

Cox Pavilion, Paradise, Nevada
Referees: William Mensah, Jason Goldenberg, Stephanie Barksdale

ESPNU

July 6
3:30 pm

Boxscore

Portland Trail Blazers 73, Detroit Pistons 93
Scoring by quarter: 19–33, 24–17, 14–18, 16–25
Pts: Simons 15; Rebs: Robinson 10; Asts: Auguste 2	Pts: Mykhailiuk 18; Rebs: Hall, Costello 8 Asts: Brown 10

Thomas & Mack Center, Paradise, Nevada
Referees: John Conley, Simone Jelks, Wojtek Liszka

NBA TV

July 6
5:00 pm

Boxscore

Atlanta Hawks 83, Milwaukee Bucks 89
Scoring by quarter: 27–24, 26–17, 15–21, 15–27
Pts: Sibert 20; Rebs: Spellman 8 Asts: Mooney 4	Pts: Colson 18; Rebs: Landale, Hamilton 8 Asts: Farrell 7

Cox Pavilion, Paradise, Nevada
Referees: Nate Green, Jamahl Ralls, Biniam Maru

ESPN

July 6
5:30 pm

Boxscore

Boston Celtics 96, Philadelphia 76ers 82
Scoring by quarter: 28–22, 30–29, 20–13, 18–18
Pts: Edwards 20; Rebs: Williams III 9 Asts: Green, Ray 3	Pts: Thybulle 15; Rebs: Pelle 13; Asts: Milton 6

Thomas & Mack Center, Paradise, Nevada
Referees: Ryan Jones, Jaston Carter, Jenna Schroeder

NBA TV

July 6
7:00 pm

Boxscore

Memphis Grizzlies 101, Indiana Pacers 75
Scoring by quarter: 26–18, 23–20, 21–22, 31–15
Pts: Caboclo 19; Rebs: Lawson 12; Asts: 5 players tied for 3	Pts: Holiday 24; Rebs: Johnson 6 Asts: Holiday 5

Cox Pavilion, Paradise, Nevada
Referees: Demoya Williams, John Butler, Ryan Sassano

ESPNU

July 6
7:30 pm

Boxscore

Los Angeles Clippers 93, Los Angeles Lakers 87
Scoring by quarter: 32–15, 14–22, 22–28, 25–22
Pts: Kabengele 21; Rebs: Kabengele 10; Asts: Michineau 5	Pts: Cacok, Young 17; Rebs: Perkins 9 Asts: Miller-McIntyre, Howard 4

Thomas & Mack Center, Paradise, Nevada
Referees: Kristyne Esparza, Suyash Mehta, Mbaye Seye

NBA TV

July 6
9:00 pm

Boxscore

Dallas Mavericks 113, Houston Rockets 81
Scoring by quarter: 32–19, 27–19, 25–20, 29–23
Pts: Macon 16; Rebs: Payne 8 Asts: Payne 6	Pts: Clemons 25; Rebs: Hartenstein 13; Asts: Chiozza 5

Cox Pavilion, Paradise, Nevada
Referees: Greg Dandridge, Sha'Rae Mitchell, Kevin Fahy

ESPN

July 6
10:00 pm

Boxscore

New Orleans Pelicans 79, Washington Wizards 84
Scoring by quarter: 17–17, 20–22, 15–26, 27–19
Pts: Bluiett 23; Rebs: Bigby-Williams 14; Asts: Perrantes 7	Pts: Brown Jr. 18; Rebs: Brown Jr. 15; Asts: Caupain 4

Thomas & Mack Center, Paradise, Nevada
Referees: Alexis Mercado, Brandon Schwab, Josh Wilson

NBA TV

July 6
11:00 pm

Boxscore

China 77, Sacramento Kings 94
Scoring by quarter: 17–24, 21–26, 20–27, 19–17
Pts: Guo 20; Rebs: Zhou 9 Asts: Zhao, Guo 5	Pts: Guy 21; Rebs: Mika 7 Asts: Guy, Christon 5

Cox Pavilion, Paradise, Nevada
Referees: Andy Nagy, Jake Ryan, Luis Migues Castillo

ESPN

July 7
12:00 am

Boxscore

Toronto Raptors 71, Golden State Warriors 80
Scoring by quarter: 22–19, 16–12, 7–28, 26–21
Pts: Boucher 22; Rebs: Boucher 13; Asts: 3 players tied 3	Pts: Evans 24; Rebs: Evans, Smailagić 8 Asts: Evans, Bowman 4

Thomas & Mack Center, Paradise, Nevada
Referees: Robert Hussey, Matt Rafferty, Pat O'Connell

==== Day 3 ====
ESPN2

July 7
3:30 pm

Boxscore

San Antonio Spurs 106, Charlotte Hornets 96
Scoring by quarter: 26–23, 26–22, 22–25, 32–26
Pts: Weatherspoon, Johnson 19; Rebs: Ben Moore 8 Asts: Magette, Robinson Jr 4	Pts: Bridges 23; Rebs: Bridges, Meeks 7 Asts: Graham, Perkins 5

Thomas & Mack Center, Paradise, Nevada
Referees: Evan Scott, Danielle Scott, Julien Scott

NBA TV

July 7
4:00 pm

Boxscore

Brooklyn Nets 74, Croatia 58
Scoring by quarter: 21–14, 16–19, 17–15, 20–10
Pts: Kurucs, Musa 15; Rebs: Allen 7 Asts: Gray 5	Pts: Vranković 12; Rebs: Šakić 11; Asts: Babić 7

Cox Pavilion, Paradise, Nevada
Referees: JB DeRosa, Jacob Barnett, Hortencia Sanchez-Carrizates

ESPN2

July 7
5:30 pm

Boxscore

Minnesota Timberwolves 90, Atlanta Hawks 66
Scoring by quarter: 32–19, 20–18, 13–14, 25–15
Pts: Okogie 15; Rebs: Bates-Diop 11; Asts: McLaughlin 5	Pts: Spellman 16; Rebs: Spellman 8 Asts: Mooney 3

Thomas & Mack Center, Paradise, Nevada
Referees: Phenizee Ransom, Natalie Sago, Intae Hwang

NBA TV

July 7
6:00 pm

Boxscore

Denver Nuggets 84, Orlando Magic 79
Scoring by quarter: 24–17, 20–19, 15–18, 25–25
Pts: Davis 22; Rebs: Vanderbilt 7 Asts: Goodwin 7	Pts: McCree 17; Rebs: Jefferson 7 Asts: Gaddy 4

Cox Pavilion, Paradise, Nevada
Referees: Jonathan Sterling, Tommy Morrissey, Kelly Broomfield

ESPN

July 7
7:30 pm

Boxscore

Chicago Bulls 75, Cleveland Cavaliers 82
Scoring by quarter: 19–21, 17–19, 22–23, 17–19
Pts: Mulder 19; Rebs: Gafford 8 Asts: White 5	Pts: Mitrou-Long 21; Rebs: Wade, Lawrence II 6 Asts: Mitrou-Long 8

Thomas & Mack Center, Paradise, Nevada
Referees: Jacyn Goble, Toni Patillo, Julian McFadden

NBA TV

July 7
8:00 pm

<Boxscore

Utah Jazz 81, Miami Heat 93
Scoring by quarter: 17–19, 17–29, 20–18, 27–27
Pts: Reed 14; Rebs: Reed 12; Asts: Wright-Foreman, Ferrari 4	Pts: Nunn 22; Rebs: Robinson 10; Asts: Nunn 8

Cox Pavilion, Paradise, Nevada
Referees: Issac Barnett, Brandon Adair, Marcelyn Williams

ESPN

July 7
9:30 pm

Boxscore

New York Knicks 100, Phoenix Suns 105 (OT)
Scoring by quarter: 30–28, 27–17, 19–26, 20–25, Overtime: 4–9
Pts: Brazdeikis 30; Rebs: Barrett 10; Asts: Allen 6	Pts: Palmer Jr. 23; Rebs: Nnoko 11; Asts: Harper 4

Thomas & Mack Center, Paradise, Nevada
Referees: Jeff Wooten, Ray Acosta, Teresa Stuck

NBA TV

July 7
10:00 pm

Boxscore

Houston Rockets 87, Portland Trail Blazers 97
Scoring by quarter: 23–29, 17–27, 26–19, 21–22
Pts: Hartenstein, Clemons 22; Rebs: Hartenstein, Williams 6 Asts: Chiozza 4	Pts: Trent Jr. 31; Rebs: Trent Jr. 6 Asts: Trent Jr. 5

Cox Pavilion, Paradise, Nevada
Referees: Randy Richardson, Ryan Sassano, Ashley Moyer-Gleich

ESPN2

July 7
11:30 pm

Boxscore

Memphis Grizzlies 87, Los Angeles Clippers 75
Scoring by quarter: 19–8, 19–29, 25–15, 24–23
Pts: Allen, Clarke 17; Rebs: Konchar 8 Asts: Konchar 4	Pts: Kabengele 19; Rebs: Mann 14; Asts: Mann 4

Thomas & Mack Center, Paradise, Nevada
Referees: Aaron Smith, Karleena Tobin, Kelsey Reynolds

==== Day 4 ====
ESPNU

July 8
3:00 pm

Boxscore

Oklahoma City Thunder 84, Philadelphia 76ers 81 (OT)
Scoring by quarter: 27–11, 25–15, 13–28, 16–27, Overtime: 3–0
Pts: Hervey 17; Rebs: Hervey 17; Asts: Evans 5	Pts: Smith 18; Rebs: Jones 16; Asts: Dozier 4

Cox Pavilion, Paradise, Nevada
Referees: Tyler Ford, Alexis Mercado, Nick Heater

NBA TV

July 8
3:30 pm

Boxscore

Sacramento Kings 105, Dallas Mavericks 101
Scoring by quarter: 22–29, 25–30, 29–18, 29–24
Pts: Doyle 22; Rebs: Christon 9 Asts: Christon 8	Pts: Payne 32; Rebs: Reaves 10; Asts: 3 players tied 3

Thomas & Mack Center, Paradise, Nevada
Referees: John Butler, Demoya Williams, Josh Wilson

ESPNU

July 8
5:00 pm

Boxscore

Indiana Pacers 84, Detroit Pistons 102
Scoring by quarter: 18–16, 17–30, 25–26, 24–30
Pts: Holiday 20; Rebs: Johnson 10; Asts: Bowen II 5	Pts: Matt Costello 20; Rebs: Brown Jr. 10; Asts: Brown Jr., Mykhailiuk 6

Cox Pavilion, Paradise, Nevada
Referees: Mitchell Ervin, Angelica Suffren, Mbaye Seye

NBA TV

July 8
5:30 pm

Boxscore

Washington Wizards 85, Brooklyn Nets 88
Scoring by quarter: 17–19, 23–14, 22–34, 23–21
Pts: Hachimura 19; Rebs: Brown Jr. 9 Asts: Caupain 7	Pts: Gray 19; Rebs: Brimah, Gray 8 Asts: Musa 5

Thomas & Mack Center, Paradise, Nevada
Referees: Kevin Fahy, Nate Anderson, Brandon Schwab

ESPNU

July 8
7:00 pm

Boxscore

San Antonio Spurs 93, Toronto Raptors 90
Scoring by quarter: 30–21, 28–18, 25–20, 10–31
Pts: Walker 32; Rebs: Eubanks, Robinson; Asts: Moore 5	Pts: Loyd 27; Rebs: Boucher 12; Asts: Loyd 7

Cox Pavilion, Paradise, Nevada
Referees: Gediminas Petraitis, Dannica Mosher, Wojtek Liszka

NBA TV

July 8
7:30 pm

Boxscore

Cleveland Cavaliers 72, Boston Celtics 89
Scoring by quarter: 17–30, 20–21, 25–18, 10–20
Pts: Mitrou-Long 13; Rebs: Bolden 7 Asts: Mitrou-Long 6	Pts: Edwards 14; Rebs: Okoye 8 Asts: Waters 5

Thomas & Mack Center, Paradise, Nevada
Referees: Andy Nagy, Bharat Ramnanan, Karleena Tobin

ESPNU

July 8
9:00 pm

Boxscore

Milwaukee Bucks 91, Minnesota Timberwolves 100
Scoring by quarter: 16–26, 22–21, 24–25, 29–28
Pts: Bryant 31; Rebs: Landale 8 Asts: Farrell 4	Pts: Creek 18; Rebs: Martin 9 Asts: 3 players tied 3

Cox Pavilion, Paradise, Nevada
Referees: Ryan Jones, Tyler Ricks, Evan Scott

NBA TV

July 8
9:30 pm

Boxscore

New Orleans Pelicans 109, Chicago Bulls 72
Scoring by quarter: 27–15, 30–20, 21–21, 31–16
Pts: Hayes 28; Rebs: Williams 13; Asts: Alexander-Walker 8	Pts: White 25; Rebs: Gafford 8 Asts: White 3

Thomas & Mack Center, Paradise, Nevada
Referees: Andy Nagy, Jemel Spearman, David Walker

ESPNU

July 8
11:00 pm

Boxscore

China 84, Charlotte Hornets 80
Scoring by quarter: 21–18, 24–20, 21–18, 18–24
Pts: Zhou 17; Rebs: Zhou 9 Asts: Fang 6	Pts: Kulboka 18; Rebs: Martin 7 Asts: Chealey 6

Cox Pavilion, Paradise, Nevada
Referees: Luis Migues Castillo, Cheryl Flores, Nate Green

NBA TV

July 8
11:30 pm

Boxscore

Golden State Warriors 88, Los Angeles Lakers 80
Scoring by quarter: 17–24, 29–13, 16–17, 26–26
Pts: Poole 23; Rebs: Lawson 7 Asts: Evans 8	Pts: Caroline 27; Rebs: Miller-McIntyre 10; Asts: Miller-McIntyre 10

Thomas & Mack Center, Paradise, Nevada
Referees: Jaston Carter, Jenna Schroeder, Paul Tuomey

==== Day 5 ====
NBA TV

July 9
3:30 pm

Boxscore

Croatia 76, Oklahoma City Thunder 84
Scoring by quarter: 27–25, 18–23, 24–11, 7–25
Pts: Čakarun 13; Rebs: Šakić 7 Asts: Rogić 5	Pts: Hervey 13; Rebs: Hervey, Bazley 5 Asts: Carrington, Evans 5

Thomas & Mack Center, Paradise, Nevada
Referees: Aaron Smith, Ashley Gilpin, Alexis Mercado

ESPN2

July 9
4:00 pm

Boxscore

Miami Heat 96, Orlando Magic 92
Scoring by quarter: 22–24, 26–28, 22–16, 26–24
Pts: Herro 25; Rebs: Maten 13; Asts: Nunn 8	Pts: Jefferson 24; Rebs: Jefferson 15; Asts: Hill 9

Cox Pavilion, Paradise, Nevada
Referees: Suyash Mehta, Stephanie Barksdale, Intae Hwang

NBA TV

July 9
5:30 pm

Boxscore

Indiana Pacers 67, Atlanta Hawks 87
Scoring by quarter: 20–14, 17–19, 19–23, 17–25
Pts: Johnson 18; Rebs: Johnson 10; Asts: Alston 4	Pts: Sibert 21; Rebs: McCall, Ward 7 Asts: Adams 5

Thomas & Mack Center, Paradise, Nevada
Referees: Ashley Moyer-Gleich, Angelica Suffren, Omar Bermudez

ESPN2

July 9
6:00 pm

Boxscore

Portland Trail Blazers 93, Utah Jazz 97
Scoring by quarter: 25–21, 19–22, 26–32, 23–22
Pts: Simons 35; Rebs: Stokes 12; Asts: Trent Jr. 5	Pts: Bradley, McGrew 17; Rebs: Bradley 7 Asts: Cousins 8

Cox Pavilion, Paradise, Nevada
Referees: Robert Hussey, Tommy Morrissey, Lauren Niemiera

NBA TV

July 9
7:30 pm

Boxscore

Phoenix Suns 69, Memphis Grizzlies 79
Scoring by quarter: 17–18, 24-29, 15–17, 13–15
Pts: Palmer Jr. 18; Rebs: Spalding 8 Asts: Palmer Jr. 4	Pts: Harvey 19; Rebs: Rabb 12; Asts: Evans 5

Thomas & Mack Center, Paradise, Nevada
Referees: Jacyn Goble, Dannica Mosher, Hortencia Sanchez

ESPN2

July 9
8:00 pm

Boxscore

Denver Nuggets 82, Boston Celtics 95
Scoring by quarter: 12–16, 23–26, 27–19, 20–34
Pts: Goodwin 28; Rebs: Vanderbilt 12; Asts: Goodwin, Sykes 4	Pts: Edwards 23; Rebs: Onuaku, Williams 8 Asts: Waters 5

Cox Pavilion, Paradise, Nevada
Referees: JB DeRosa, Charles Watson, Clare Aubry

NBA TV

July 9
9:30 pm

Boxscore

New York Knicks 73, Toronto Raptors 85
Scoring by quarter: 23–19, 11–28, 13–20, 26–18
Pts: Barrett 17; Rebs: Robinson 14; Asts: Barrett 6	Pts: Boucher 23; Rebs: Hernandez 11; Asts: Loyd 7

Thomas & Mack Center, Paradise, Nevada
Referees: Ray Acosta, Ben Stirt, Marcy Williams

ESPN2

July 9
10:00 pm

Boxscore

Sacramento Kings 92, Houston Rockets 94
Scoring by quarter: 19–19, 23–20, 25–21, 25–34
Pts: Guy 16; Rebs: Thompson 8 Asts: James 4	Pts: Clark 24; Rebs: Williams 9 Asts: Chiozza 10

Cox Pavilion, Paradise, Nevada
Referees: Matt Kallio, Tyler Ricks, Stacie Blow

NBA TV

July 9
11:30 pm

Boxscore

Los Angeles Clippers 90, Washington Wizards 72
Scoring by quarter: 25–20, 25–19, 16–17, 24–16
Pts: Robinson 17; Rebs: Mann 11; Asts: Mann 9	Pts: Schofield 16; Rebs: Wagner 6 Asts: Robinson 5

Thomas & Mack Center, Paradise, Nevada
Referees: Mousa Dagher, Kristyne Esparza, Matt Rafferty

==== Day 6 ====
NBA TV

July 10
3:00 pm

Boxscore

Philadelphia 76ers 81, Detroit Pistons 96
Scoring by quarter: 16–23, 27–22, 17–25, 21–26
Pts: Thybulle, Jalen Jones 12; Rebs: Jones 8 Asts: Shayok, Dozier 4	Pts: Costello 18; Rebs: Brown 14; Asts: Brown 10

Cox Pavilion, Paradise, Nevada
Referees: Jason Goldenberg, Will Mensah, Wojtek Liszka

ESPNU

July 10
3:30 pm

Boxscore

Croatia 71, Dallas Mavericks 79
Scoring by quarter: 17–19, 8–22, 21–20, 25–18
Pts: Rogic 15; Rebs: Vrankovic 6 Asts: Rogic 6	Pts: Whittington 19; Rebs: Roby 6 Asts: Macon 6

Thomas & Mack Center, Paradise, Nevada
Referees: Nate Green, Andy Nagy, Ryan Jones

NBA TV

July 10
5:00 pm

Boxscore

Charlotte Hornets 72, Chicago Bulls 75
Scoring by quarter: 18–12, 19–18, 22–20, 13–25
Pts: Hicks 15; Rebs: Hicks 8 Asts: Graham 7	Pts: Gafford 20; Rebs: Gafford 10; Asts: White 5

Cox Pavilion, Paradise, Nevada
Referees: Jonathan Sterling, Tyler Mirkovich, Luis Migues Castillo

ESPNU

July 10
5:30 pm

Boxscore

Orlando Magic 85, Brooklyn Nets 93
Scoring by quarter: 15–21, 22–31, 28–15, 20–26
Pts: Hill 21; Rebs: Jefferson 8 Asts: Hill 6	Pts: Musa 20; Rebs: Allen 13; Asts: Josh Gray 5

Thomas & Mack Center, Paradise, Nevada
Referees: Matt Myers, Cheryl Flores, Mbaye Seye

NBA TV

July 10
7:00 pm

Boxscore

Minnesota Timberwolves 89, Miami Heat 87
Scoring by quarter: 24–34, 13–19, 30–17, 22–17
Pts: McLaughlin 17; Rebs: Reid 10; Asts: McLaughlin 6	Pts: Nunn 28; Rebs: Maten, Alexander 9 Asts: Nunn 5

Cox Pavilion, Paradise, Nevada
Referees: Brandon Adair, John Butler, Blanca Burns

ESPN2

July 10
7:30 pm

Boxscore

Cleveland Cavaliers 78, New Orleans Pelicans 99
Scoring by quarter: 11–27, 13–20, 22–19, 32–33
Pts: Long 19; Rebs: Wade 8 Asts: Wade, Newman 3	Pts: Alexander-Walker 26; Rebs: Williams 10; Asts: Alexander-Walker 6

Thomas & Mack Center, Paradise, Nevada
Referees: Phenizee Ransom, Jenna Schroeder, Shante Anderson

NBA TV

July 10
9:00 pm

Boxscore

San Antonio Spurs 78, Phoenix Suns 79
Scoring by quarter: 13–16, 25–20, 19–25, 21–18
Pts: Weatherspoon 19; Rebs: Samanic 11; Asts: Magette 6	Pts: Lecque 14; Rebs: Nnoko 7 Asts: Harper 4

Cox Pavilion, Paradise, Nevada
Referees: Mousa Dagher, Kevin Fahy, Brent Haskill

ESPN2

July 10
9:30 pm

Boxscore

Los Angeles Lakers 96, New York Knicks 117
Scoring by quarter: 24–33, 20–33, 22–29, 30–22
Pts: Norvell Jr. 20; Rebs: Cacok 9 Asts: Miller-McIntyre 5	Pts: Knox 25; Rebs: Robinson 11; Asts: Allen 6

Thomas & Mack Center, Paradise, Nevada
Referees: Natalie Sago, Nick Heater, Jenna Reneau

NBA TV

July 10
11:00 pm

Boxscore

China 67, Milwaukee Bucks 84
Scoring by quarter: 19–22, 21–17, 13–27, 14–18
Pts: Zhou 14; Rebs: Zhou 17; Asts: Jiwei, Zhao 3	Pts: Landale 23; Rebs: Colson 7 Asts: Farrell 6

Cox Pavilion, Paradise, Nevada
Referees: Tyler Ford, Ashley Gilpin, Julian Scott

ESPNU

July 10
11:30 pm

Boxscore

Golden State Warriors 73, Denver Nuggets 69
Scoring by quarter: 13–20, 14–18, 22–24, 24–7
Pts: Evans 17; Rebs: Poole, Lawson 6 Asts: Lawson 4	Pts: Vanderbilt 20; Rebs: Vanderbilt 17; Asts: Goodwin 5

Thomas & Mack Center, Paradise, Nevada
Referees: Aaron Smith, Greg Dandridge, Angel Kent

==== Day 7 ====
NBA TV

July 11
6:00 pm

Boxscore

Toronto Raptors 94, Indiana Pacers 79
Scoring by quarter: 20–22, 26–26, 22–13, 26–18
Pts: Hernandez 18; Rebs: Solomon 10; Asts: Loyd 6	Pts: Holiday 23; Rebs: Johnson 9 Asts: Johnson 5

Cox Pavilion, Paradise, Nevada
Referees: Mitchell Ervin, Simone Jelks, Ken Jones

ESPN2

July 11
6:30 pm

Boxscore

Atlanta Hawks 71, Washington Wizards 76
Scoring by quarter: 22–13, 12–19, 17–20, 20–24
Pts: Brown Jr. 16; Rebs: McCall 9 Asts: Adams 9	Pts: Hachimura25; Rebs: Hachimura 9 Asts: Caupain, Robinson 4

Thomas & Mack Center, Paradise, Nevada
Referees: JB DeRosa, Jacob Ryan, Sha'Rae Mitchell

NBA TV

July 11
8:00 pm

Boxscore

Portland Trail Blazers 87, Oklahoma City Thunder 92
Scoring by quarter: 20–20, 16–28, 28–24, 23–20
Pts: Trent Jr.22; Rebs: Trent Jr. Asts: Whitehead 4	Pts: Hervey 20; Rebs: Hervey, Diallo 7 Asts: Carrington 6

Cox Pavilion, Paradise, Nevada
Referees: Gediminas Petraitis, Brandon Schwab, Julian McFadden

ESPNU

July 11
8:30 pm

Boxscore

Utah Jazz 78, Houston Rockets 87
Scoring by quarter: 18–25, 20–26, 19–21, 21–15
Pts: Bradley 23; Rebs: Bradley 13; Asts: Cousins, Ferrari 5	Pts: Clemons 19; Rebs: Adel, J. Williams 6 Asts: Chiozza 5

Thomas & Mack Center, Paradise, Nevada
Referees: Jacyn Goble, Bharat Ramnanan, Nathan Anderson

NBA TV

July 11
10:00 pm

Boxscore

Sacramento Kings 80, Los Angeles Clippers 83
Scoring by quarter: 18–21, 29-16, 16–25, 17–21
Pts: Gabriel 18; Rebs: Thompson 12; Asts: Christon 5	Pts: Coffey 19; Rebs: Coffey, Kabengele 9 Asts: Coffey 6

Cox Pavilion, Paradise, Nevada
Referees: Evan Scott, Chance Moore, Cheryl Flores

ESPN2

July 11
10:30 pm

Boxscore

Boston Celtics 113, Memphis Grizzlies 87
Scoring by quarter: 26–23, 32–18, 28–25, 27–21
Pts: Williams 21; Rebs: Williams III 16; Asts: Waters 9	Pts: Hannahs 15; Rebs: Caboclo 6 Asts: Allen 4

Thomas & Mack Center, Paradise, Nevada
Referees: Ray Acosta, J.D. Ralls, Jemel Spearman

==== Standings/seedings ====
#	Team	GP	W	L	PCT	QP	PD
1	Boston Celtics	4	4	0	1.000	7	+13
2	Detroit Pistons	4	4	0	1.000	4.5	-22
3	Minnesota Timberwolves	4	4	0	1.000	7	+19
4	New Orleans Pelicans	4	3	1	.750	7	+31
5	Miami Heat	4	3	1	.750	4	-22
6	Dallas Mavericks	4	3	1	.750	7	+16
7	Brooklyn Nets	4	3	1	.750	5	
8	Memphis Grizzlies	4	3	1	.750	4	-41
9	Los Angeles Clippers	4	3	1	.750	6	-10
10	Golden State Warriors	4	3	1	.750	5.5	-20
11	Oklahoma City Thunder	4	3	1	.750	8	
12	Phoenix Suns	3	2	1	.667	8	+33
13	Sacramento Kings	4	2	2	.500	5	-4
14	Toronto Raptors	4	2	2	.500	4	
15	Milwaukee Bucks	4	2	2	.500	7.5	
16	San Antonio Spurs	4	2	2	.500	5.5	-11
17	Utah Jazz	4	2	2	.500	5	-18
18	Washington Wizards	4	2	2	.500	7	-6
19	Chicago Bulls	4	2	2	.500	4.5	-12
20	Houston Rockets	4	2	2	.500	6	
21	Denver Nuggets	3	1	2	.333	8	+21
22	Orlando Magic	4	1	3	.250	5.5	+18
23	New York Knicks	4	1	3	.250	5	-20
24	Charlotte Hornets	4	1	3	.250	6	-11
25	Atlanta Hawks	4	1	3	.250	6	-11
26	Portland Trail Blazers	4	1	3	.250	8	+38
27	Philadelphia 76ers	4	1	3	.250	2	
28	Cleveland Cavaliers	4	1	3	.250	5.5	+13
29	China	4	1	3	.250	10.5	
30	Croatia	4	0	4	.000	10.5	
31	Los Angeles Lakers	4	0	4	.000	10.5	
32	Indiana Pacers	4	0	4	.000	7	+2

==== Bracket ====
Quarterfinals (July 13)
1	Boston Celtics	88
8	Memphis Grizzlies	94
4	New Orleans Pelicans (OT)	101
5	Miami Heat	100
3	Minnesota Timberwolves	108
6	Dallas Mavericks	82
7	Brooklyn Nets	105
2	Detroit Pistons	85

Semifinals (July 14)
8	Memphis Grizzlies (OT)	88
4	New Orleans Pelicans	86
3	Minnesota Timberwolves	85
7	Brooklyn Nets	77

Championship (July 15)
8	Memphis Grizzlies	95
3	Minnesota Timberwolves	92

===== Consolation Round =====
ESPNU

July 12
4:00 pm

Boxscore

Philadelphia 76ers 108, Toronto Raptors 102
Scoring by quarter: 27–22, 29–24, 31–28, 21–28
Pts: Dozier 22; Rebs: Dozier 7 Asts: Dozier 7	Pts: Wiggington 26; Rebs: Davis 8 Asts: Davis 7

Cox Pavilion, Paradise, Nevada
Referees: Jason Goldenberg, Blanca Burns, Brent Haskill

NBA TV

July 12
4:30 pm

Boxscore

Los Angeles Lakers 88, Golden State Warriors 87
Scoring by quarter: 19–24, 14–33, 31–12, 24–18
Pts: Caroline 20; Rebs: Wear 9 Asts: Miller-McIntyre 5	Pts: McClain 24; Rebs: Izundu 11; Asts: Toscano 5

Thomas & Mack Center, Paradise, Nevada
Referees: Nick Heater, Matt Kallio, Ashley Moyer-Gleich

ESPNU

July 12
5:00 pm

Boxscore

Croatia 68, Oklahoma City Thunder 69
Scoring by quarter: 13–18, 22–15, 16–17, 17–19
Pts: Vrankovic 16; Rebs: Vrankovic 10; Asts: Rogic 7	Pts: Cannady 12; Rebs: Bazley 6 Asts: Carrington 11

Cox Pavilion, Paradise, Nevada
Referees: John Conley, Chance Moore, Jonathan Sterling

NBA TV

July 12
6:30 pm

Boxscore

China 64, Phoenix Suns 94
Scoring by quarter: 13–22, 9–21, 20–32, 22–19
Pts: Guo 15; Rebs: Hu 5 Asts: Fang 3	Pts: 3 players tied 11; Rebs: Cooks, Tillman 4 Asts: Obasohan 4

Thomas & Mack Center, Paradise, Nevada
Referees: Matt Myers, Shante Anderson, Tyler Mirkovich

ESPNU

July 12
8:00 pm

Boxscore

Cleveland Cavaliers 98, Sacramento Kings 96 (OT)
Scoring by quarter: 19–26, 22–24, 30–27, 22–16, Overtime: 5–3
Pts: Newman33; Rebs: Williams 11; Asts: Williams 4	Pts: Johnson 20; Rebs: Ashley 12; Asts: Doyle 7

Cox Pavilion, Paradise, Nevada
Referees: Brandon Adair, Suyash Mehta, Angel Kent

NBA TV

July 12
8:30 pm

Boxscore

Indiana Pacers 86, Los Angeles Clippers 75
Scoring by quarter: 21–17, 16–11, 22–28, 27–19
Pts: Johnson 25; Rebs: Johnson 13; Asts: Demps 4	Pts: Brissett 18; Rebs: Carter 8 Asts: Isabell 8

Thomas & Mack Center, Paradise, Nevada
Referees: Phenizee Ransom, Simone Jelks, Paul Tuomey

ESPNU

July 12
10:00 pm

Boxscore

Portland Trail Blazers 99, Milwaukee Bucks 84
Scoring by quarter: 27–24, 16–26, 33–17, 23–17
Pts: Trent Jr. 28; Rebs: Trent Jr. 8 Asts: Jackson 6	Pts: Colson 14; Rebs: Hamilton 6 Asts: Farrell 5

Cox Pavilion, Paradise, Nevada
Referees: Mousa Dagher, Robert Hussey, Jenna Reneau

NBA TV

July 12
10:30 pm

Boxscore

Atlanta Hawks 80, San Antonio Spurs 72
Scoring by quarter: 24–18, 26–10, 10–24, 20–20
Pts: Mooney 17; Rebs: Ward 13; Asts: McCall 6	Pts: Morris 12; Rebs: Robinson 11; Asts: Robinson Jr. 5

Thomas & Mack Center, Paradise, Nevada
Referees: Natalie Sago, Pat O'Connell, David Walker

NBA TV

July 13
4:00 pm

Boxscore

Charlotte Hornets 84, Utah Jazz 74
Scoring by quarter: 31–15, 23–15, 13–22, 17–22
Pts: Meeks 18; Rebs: Meeks 10; Asts: Perkins 5	Pts: King 20; Rebs: Morgan 9 Asts: Lyles 6

Cox Pavilion, Paradise, Nevada
Referees: Brandon Adair, Jenna Schroeder, Nick Heater

NBA TV

July 13
6:00 pm

Boxscore

New York Knicks 103, Washington Wizards 87
Scoring by quarter: 27–23, 24–27, 19–22, 33–15
Pts: Barrett 21; Rebs: Robinson 9 Asts: Barrett 10	Pts: Wagner 20; Rebs: Pasceniks 10; Asts: Caupain 6

Cox Pavilion, Paradise, Nevada
Referees: Tyler Ford, Tyler Ricks, Shante Anderson

NBA TV

July 13
8:00 pm

Boxscore

Orlando Magic 85, Chicago Bulls 73
Scoring by quarter: 25–19, 16–25, 27–13, 17–16
Pts: Jefferson 19; Rebs: Jefferson 12; Asts: Hill 6	Pts: Gafford 14; Rebs: Hutchison 10; Asts: White 8

Cox Pavilion, Paradise, Nevada
Referees: Gediminas Petraitis, Nate Green, Biniam Maru

NBA TV

July 13
10:00 pm

Boxscore

Denver Nuggets 96, Houston Rockets 105
Scoring by quarter: 22-19, 25–32, 19–28, 30–26
Pts: Goodwin 22; Rebs: Vanderbilt 9 Asts: Goodwin 6	Pts: Adel 20; Rebs: Clemons 10; Asts: Chiozza 8

Cox Pavilion, Paradise, Nevada
Referees: Jason Goldenberg, John Butler, Jacob Barnett

===== Quarterfinals =====
ESPN

July 13
4:30 pm

Boxscore

Memphis Grizzlies 94, Boston Celtics 88
Scoring by quarter: 19–22, 30–15, 22–26, 23–25
Pts: Harvey 20; Rebs: Clarke 12; Asts: Lee 4	Pts: Edwards 25; Rebs: Williams III 12; Asts: Waters, Strus 3

Thomas & Mack Center, Paradise, Nevada
Referees: Phenizee Ransom, Kevin Fahy, Sha'Rae Mitchell

ESPN

July 13
6:30 pm

Boxscore

Miami Heat 100, New Orleans Pelicans 101 (OT)
Scoring by quarter: 15–27, 24–19, 31–21, 28–31, Overtime: 2–3
Pts: Robinson 26; Rebs: Alexander 11; Asts: Martin 5	Pts: Alexander-Walker 34; Rebs: Hayes 12; Asts: Alexander-Walker 5

Thomas & Mack Center, Paradise, Nevada
Referees: Mitchell Ervin, Ashley Moyer-Gleich, Charles Watson

ESPN

July 13
8:30 pm

Boxscore

Brooklyn Nets 105, Detroit Pistons 85
Scoring by quarter: 25–19, 23–20, 25–21, 32–25
Pts: Allen 30; Rebs: Allen 11; Asts: Gray 5	Pts: Bone 18; Rebs: Costello 8 Asts: three players tied 3

Thomas & Mack Center, Paradise, Nevada
Referees: Mousa Dagher, Evan Scott, Ben Stirt

ESPN2

July 13
10:30 pm

Boxscore

Dallas Mavericks 82, Minnesota Timberwolves 108
Scoring by quarter: 20-29, 22-21, 18-31, 22-27
Pts: Cleveland 17; Rebs: Whittington 8 Asts: Macon 4	Pts: Martin 23; Rebs: Murphy, Creek 6 Asts: McLaughlin 9

Thomas & Mack Center, Paradise, Nevada
Referees: Natalie Sago, Andy Nagy, Matt Kallio

===== Semifinals =====
ESPN2

July 14
6:00 pm

Boxscore

Memphis Grizzlies 88, New Orleans Pelicans 86 (OT)
Scoring by quarter: 16–18, 21–15, 29–23, 15–25, Overtime: 7–5
Pts: Clarke 23; Rebs: Clarke 14; Asts: Evans 8	Pts: Bluiett 16; Rebs: Williams 11; Asts: Alexander-Walker 5

Thomas & Mack Center, Paradise, Nevada
Referees: Jonathan Sterling, Matt Myers, Ray Acosta

ESPN2

July 14
8:00 pm

Boxscore

Brooklyn Nets 77, Minnesota Timberwolves 85
Scoring by quarter: 26–29, 22–26, 11–24, 18–6
Pts: Allen 15; Rebs: Allen 14; Asts: Kurucs 2	Pts: Reid 20; Rebs: Murphy 7 Asts: McLaughlin 6

Thomas & Mack Center, Paradise, Nevada
Referees: JB DeRosa, Aaron Smith, Jacyn Goble

===== Championship =====
ESPN2

July 15
9:00 pm

Boxscore

Memphis Grizzlies 95, Minnesota Timberwolves 92
Scoring by quarter: 31-19, 25-21, 16-30, 23-22
Pts: Allen 17; Rebs: Clarke 16; Asts: Evans 8	Pts: Martin 19; Rebs: Reid 10; Asts: McLaughlin 3

Thomas & Mack Center, Paradise, Nevada

=== Statistical leaders ===
Points

Player	Team	PPG
Frank Jackson	New Orleans Pelicans	30.0
Lonnie Walker IV	San Antonio Spurs	30.0
Nickeil Alexander-Walker	New Orleans Pelicans	24.3
Kevin McClain	Golden State Warriors	24.0
Chris Boucher	Toronto Raptors	23.0

Rebounds

Player	Team	RPG
Tony Bradley	Utah Jazz	11.3
Jarred Vanderbilt	Denver Nuggets	11.3
Terance Mann	Los Angeles Clippers	11.3
Jarrett Allen	Brooklyn Nets	10.6
Mitchell Robinson	New York Knicks	10.6

Assists

Player	Team	APG
Bruce Brown (basketball)	Detroit Pistons	8.3
Chris Chiozza	Houston Rockets	6.4
Kendrick Nunn	Miami Heat	6.3
Codi Miller-McIntyre	Los Angeles Lakers	6.0
Nickeil Alexander-Walker	New Orleans Pelicans	6.0
