= 2014–15 Cincinnati Bearcats men's basketball team =

American college basketball season

2014–15 Cincinnati Bearcats men's basketball

NCAA tournament, round of 32
- Conference: American Athletic Conference
- Record: 23–11 (13–5 The American)
- Head coach: Mick Cronin (9th season)
- Assistant coaches: Larry Davis (9th season); Antwon Jackson (3rd season); Darren Savino (5th season)
- Home arena: Fifth Third Arena

2014–15 American Athletic Conference men's basketball standings
	Conf.				Overall
Team	W		L	PCT	W		L	PCT
No. 18 SMU †	15	–	3	.833	27	–	7	.794
Tulsa	14	–	4	.778	23	–	11	.676
Temple	13	–	5	.722	26	–	11	.703
Cincinnati	13	–	5	.722	23	–	11	.676
UConn	10	–	8	.556	20	–	15	.571
Memphis	10	–	8	.556	18	–	14	.563
Tulane	6	–	12	.333	15	–	16	.484
East Carolina	6	–	12	.333	14	–	19	.424
UCF	5	–	13	.278	12	–	18	.400
Houston	4	–	14	.222	13	–	19	.406
South Florida	3	–	15	.167	9	–	23	.281
† The American Tournament winner Rankings from AP poll

The 2014–15 Cincinnati Bearcats men's basketball team represented the University of Cincinnati in the 2014–15 NCAA Division I men's basketball season. The Bearcats played home games on Ed Jucker Court at the Fifth Third Arena. The 2014–15 season was the second season the Bearcats participated in the American Athletic Conference, and were coached by Mick Cronin in his ninth season. Mick Cronin discovered he had an arterial dissection and sat out the rest of the season, last coaching December 17 against San Diego State, which would see Assistant Head Coach Larry Davis coach the rest of the season. They finished the season 23–11, 13–5 in AAC play to finish in a tie for third place. They lost in the quarterfinals of the American Athletic tournament to UConn. They received an at-large bid to the NCAA tournament where they defeated Purdue in the second round before losing in the third round to Kentucky.

== Offseason ==
=== Departing players ===
Name	Number	Pos.	Height	Weight	Year	Hometown	Notes
Derek Cox	0	G	6'3'"	186	RS Senior	Mason, Ohio	Walk-on; graduated
Jeremiah Davis III	0	G	6'3"	199	RS Sophomore	Muncie, Indiana	Transferred to Ball State (mid-season)
Titus Rubles	2	F	6'7'"	220	Senior	Dallas, Texas	Graduated
Justin Jackson	5	F	6'8'"	230	Senior	Cocoa Beach, Florida	Graduated
Jermaine Lawrence	11	F	6'3"	199	Freshman	Springfield Gardens, New York	Transferred to Manhattan
Sean Kilpatrick	23	G	6'4'"	210	RS Senior	Yonkers, New York	Graduated
David Nyarsuk	33	C	7'1'"	250	Senior	Juba, South Sudan	Graduated

=== Incoming transfers ===
Name	Pos.	Height	Weight	Year	Hometown	Notes
Coreontae DeBerry	C	6'10"	270	Junior	Holland, MI	Junior college transferred from Hutchinson CC
Octavius Ellis	C	6'10"	205	Junior	Memphis, TN	Junior college transferred from Trinity Valley CC
Farad Cobb	G	6'0"	175	Junior	West Palm Beach, FL	Junior college transferred from Northwest Florida SC

=== Recruiting class of 2014 ===
College recruiting information
Name	Hometown	School	Height	Weight	Commit date
Quadri Moore; C	Linden, NJ	Linden High School	6 ft 8 in (2.03 m)	230 lb (100 kg)	Sep 17, 2013
Quadri Moore; C	Recruit ratings: Scout: Rivals: 247Sports: (75)				
Gary Clark; PF	Clayton, NC	Clayton High School	6 ft 7 in (2.01 m)	230 lb (100 kg)	Sep 18, 2013
Gary Clark; PF	Recruit ratings: Scout: Rivals: 247Sports: (80)				
Overall recruit ranking: 247Sports: 31
Note: In many cases, Scout, Rivals, 247Sports, On3, and ESPN may conflict in their listings of height and weight.; In these cases, the average was taken. ESPN grades are on a 100-point scale.; Sources: "Cincinnati 2014 Player Commits". ESPN.; "2014 Team Ranking". Rivals.

=== Recruiting class of 2015 ===
College recruiting information (2015)
Name	Hometown	School	Height	Weight	Commit date
Jacob Evans; G	Baton Rouge, LA	St. Michael High School	6 ft 5 in (1.96 m)	190 lb (86 kg)	Oct 14, 2013
Jacob Evans; G	Recruit ratings: Scout: Rivals: 247Sports: (80)				
Justin Jenifer; G	Gwynn Oak, MD	Milford Mill Academy	5 ft 9 in (1.75 m)	185 lb (84 kg)	Jun 9, 2014
Justin Jenifer; G	Recruit ratings: Scout: Rivals: 247Sports: (80)				
Tre Scott; F	Darien, GA	McIntosh County Academy	6 ft 7 in (2.01 m)	200 lb (91 kg)	Sep 15, 2014
Tre Scott; F	Recruit ratings: Scout: Rivals: 247Sports: (78)				
Overall recruit ranking: Scout: NR Rivals: NR 247Sports: 53 ESPN: NR
Note: In many cases, Scout, Rivals, 247Sports, On3, and ESPN may conflict in their listings of height and weight.; In these cases, the average was taken. ESPN grades are on a 100-point scale.; Sources: "Cincinnati 2015 Player Commits". ESPN.; "2015 Team Ranking". Rivals.

== Roster ==
2014–15 Cincinnati Bearcats men's basketball team
Players
Coaches

Pos.	#	Name	Height	Weight	Year	Previous school	Hometown
F	0	Quadri Moore	6 ft 8 in (2.03 m)	230 lb (104 kg)	Fr	Linden High School	Linden, New Jersey
G	1	Deshaun Morman (S)	6 ft 3 in (1.91 m)	190 lb (86 kg)	RS Fr	Faith Baptist Christian School	Richmond, Virginia
C	2	Octavius Ellis	6 ft 10 in (2.08 m)	230 lb (104 kg)	Jr	Trinity Valley CC	Memphis, Tennessee
F	3	Shaquille Thomas	6 ft 7 in (2.01 m)	205 lb (93 kg)	RS Jr	NIA Prep	Paterson, New Jersey
G	10	Troy Caupain	6 ft 3 in (1.91 m)	200 lb (91 kg)	So	Cosby High School	Midlothian, Virginia
F	11	Gary Clark	6 ft 7 in (2.01 m)	230 lb (104 kg)	Fr	Clayton High School	Clayton, North Carolina
G	14	Ge'Lawn Guyn (injured) (LT)	6 ft 2 in (1.88 m)	185 lb (84 kg)	Sr	South Kent Prep	Georgetown, Kentucky
F	15	Jermaine Sanders (C)	6 ft 5 in (1.96 m)	210 lb (95 kg)	Sr	Rice High School	Far Rockaway, New York
G	21	Farad Cobb	6 ft 1 in (1.85 m)	165 lb (75 kg)	Jr	Northwest Florida SC	West Palm Beach, Florida
C	22	Coreontae DeBerry	6 ft 10 in (2.08 m)	270 lb (122 kg)	Jr	Hutchinson CC	Holland, Michigan
G	25	Kevin Johnson	6 ft 2 in (1.88 m)	175 lb (79 kg)	So	Summit Country Day School	Cincinnati, Ohio
C	32	Jamaree Strickland (T)	6 ft 10 in (2.08 m)	270 lb (122 kg)	RS Fr	Queen City Prep	Oakland, California
G	42	Rob Blissitt Jr. (W)	6 ft 3 in (1.91 m)	175 lb (79 kg)	So	Thornwood High School	Markham, Illinois
F	45	Zack Tobler (W)	6 ft 5 in (1.96 m)	215 lb (98 kg)	So	Covington Catholic High School	Fort Mitchell, Kentucky

Head coach

- Mick Cronin (Cincinnati)

Assistant coach(es)

- Larry Davis (Asbury)
- Darren Savino (NJCU)
- Antwon Jackson (Pikeville)

Legend

- (C) Team captain
- (S) Suspended
- (I) Ineligible
- (W) Walk-on
- (T) Transferred
- (LT) Left team
- Injured
- Current redshirt

Roster
Last update: 2015-03-03

- Nov 21, 2014 - Ge'Lawn Guyn injured his pinky in practice. Guyn would leave the team after the fall semester and graduate in the spring. He maintained one year of eligibility and later transferred to East Tennessee State.
- Dec 13, 2014 - Jamaree Strickland elected to transfer after the fall semester. Strickland had been suspended from the team since November 26. Strickland eventually transferred to Arizona Western College.
- Feb 19, 2015 - Following the Xavier game, Deshaun Morman was indefinitely suspended. Morman would eventually transfer to Towson after the conclusion of the season.

=== Depth chart ===
Pos.	Starting 5	Bench 1	Bench 2
C	Octavius Ellis	Coreontae DeBerry
PF	Gary Clark	Quadri Moore	Zack Tobler
SF	Shaq Thomas	Jermaine Sanders
SG	Kevin Johnson	Farad Cobb	Rob Blissitt Jr.
PG	Troy Caupain	Ge'Lawn Guyn	Deshaun Morman

== Schedule ==
Date time, TV	Rank^{#}	Opponent^{#}	Result	Record	Site (attendance) city, state
Exhibition
November 3, 2014*; 7:00pm		Bellarmine	W 86–79		Fifth Third Arena (4,234); Cincinnati, OH
November 8, 2014*; 2:00pm		Fairmont State	W 71–54		Fifth Third Arena (4,486); Cincinnati, OH
Regular Season
November 14, 2014*; 8:00pm, ESPN3		Saint Francis (PA)	W 52–37	1–0	Fifth Third Arena (7,114); Cincinnati, OH
November 19, 2014*; 7:00pm, FSOH		Morehead State	W 69–61	2–0	Fifth Third Arena (6,119); Cincinnati, OH
November 23, 2014*; 5:00pm, FSOH		Eastern Illinois; Emerald Coast Classic First Round	W 54–49	3–0	Fifth Third Arena (6,823); Cincinnati, OH
November 25, 2014*; 7:00pm, FSOH		NC Central; Emerald Coast Classic Second Round	W 59–50	4–0	Fifth Third Arena (7,015); Cincinnati, OH
November 28, 2014*; 6:00pm		vs. Middle Tennessee; Emerald Coast Classic Third Round	W 69–51	5–0	The Arena at NWFSC (1,200); Niceville, FL
November 29, 2014*; 9:00pm, CBSSN		vs. Ole Miss; Emerald Coast Classic Championship	L 54–66	5–1	The Arena at NWFSC (1,550); Niceville, FL
December 2, 2014*; 7:00pm, FSOH		Stony Brook	W 78–52	6–1	Fifth Third Arena (6,603); Cincinnati, OH
December 13, 2014*; 9:00pm, BTN		at Nebraska	L 55–56 ^{2OT}	6–2	Pinnacle Bank Arena (15,607); Lincoln, NE
December 17, 2014*; 9:00pm, ESPN2		No. 19 San Diego State	W 71–62 ^{OT}	7–2	Fifth Third Arena (9,217); Cincinnati, OH
December 20, 2014*; 12:00pm, ESPNU		VCU	L 47–68	7–3	Fifth Third Arena (9,250); Cincinnati, OH
December 23, 2014*; 7:00pm, FSOH		Wagner	W 72–48	8–3	Fifth Third Arena (6,023); Cincinnati, OH
December 30, 2014*; 4:00pm, ESPNU		at NC State	W 76–60	9–3	PNC Arena (16,980); Raleigh, NC
January 3, 2015; 11:00am, ESPN2		SMU	W 56–50	10–3 (1–0)	Fifth Third Arena (10,013); Cincinnati, OH
January 6, 2015; 7:00pm, ESPNU		East Carolina	W 69–48	11–3 (2–0)	Fifth Third Arena (7,516); Cincinnati, OH
January 10, 2015; 11:00am, ESPN2		at UConn	L 56–62	11–4 (2–1)	XL Center (15,564); Hartford, CT
January 15, 2015; 7:00pm, ESPN		at Memphis; Rivalry	L 50–63	11–5 (2–2)	FedEx Forum (14,916); Memphis, TN
January 17, 2015; 7:30pm, ESPNU		Temple	W 84–53	12–5 (3–2)	Fifth Third Arena (12,071); Cincinnati, OH
January 21, 2015; 7:00pm, ESPNews		Houston	W 67–54	13–5 (4–2)	Fifth Third Arena (9,815); Cincinnati, OH
January 25, 2015; 2:00pm, CBSSN		at UCF	W 56–46	14–5 (5–2)	CFE Arena (3,874); Orlando, FL
January 29, 2015; 8:00pm, ESPN2		UConn	W 70–58	15–5 (6–2)	Fifth Third Arena (11,092); Cincinnati, OH
February 1, 2015; 1:00pm, CBSSN		at East Carolina	L 46–50	15–6 (6–3)	Williams Arena (4,574); Greenville, NC
February 5, 2015; 9:00pm, ESPN		at No. 23 SMU	W 62–54	16–6 (7–3)	Moody Coliseum (7,098); University Park, TX
February 7, 2015; 8:00pm, CBSSN		South Florida	W 63–58	17–6 (8–3)	Fifth Third Arena (11,670); Cincinnati, OH
February 10, 2015; 7:30pm, CBSSN		at Temple	L 59–75	17–7 (8–4)	Liacouras Center (11,670); Philadelphia, PA
February 14, 2015; 2:00pm, ESPNU		Tulane	L 49–50	17–8 (8–5)	Fifth Third Arena (12,041); Cincinnati, OH
February 18, 2015*; 7:00pm, ESPN2		Xavier; Crosstown Shootout	L 57–59	17–9	Fifth Third Arena (13,176); Cincinnati, OH
February 21, 2015; 9:30pm, ESPNU		at Houston	W 63–53	18–9 (9–5)	Hofheinz Pavilion (3,562); Houston, TX
February 25, 2015; 7:30pm, CBSSN		UCF	W 83–60	19–9 (10–5)	Fifth Third Arena (9,825); Cincinnati, OH
February 28, 2015; 2:00pm, ESPNews		at Tulane	W 63–47	20–9 (11–5)	Devlin Fieldhouse (2,430); New Orleans, LA
March 4, 2015; 9:00pm, CBSSN		at Tulsa	W 56–47	21–9 (12–5)	Reynolds Center (5,840); Tulsa, OK
March 8, 2015; 12:00pm, CBS		Memphis; Rivalry	W 77–65	22–9 (13–5)	Fifth Third Arena (12,358); Cincinnati, OH
AAC Tournament
March 13, 2015; 9:00pm, ESPNU	(3)	vs. (6) UConn; Quarterfinals	L 54–57	22–10	XL Center (9,514); Hartford, CT
NCAA Tournament
March 19, 2015*; 7:10pm, CBS	(8 MW)	vs. (9 MW) Purdue; Second Round	W 66–65 ^{OT}	23–10	KFC Yum! Center (21,639); Louisville, KY
March 21, 2015*; 2:40pm, CBS	(8 MW)	vs. (1 MW) No. 1 Kentucky; Third Round	L 51–64	23–11	KFC Yum! Center (21,760); Louisville, KY
*Non-conference game. ^{#}Rankings from AP Poll. (#) Tournament seedings in parentheses. MW=Midwest Region. All times are in Eastern Time.

== Awards and milestones ==
=== American Athletic Conference honors ===
==== All-AAC Second Team ====
- Octavius Ellis

==== All-AAC Honorable Mention ====
- Troy Caupain

==== All-AAC Rookie Team ====
- Gary Clark

==== Player of the Week ====
- Week 17: Farad Cobb

==== Rookie of the Week ====
- Week 4: Gary Clark
