= Jacob Evans =

American basketball player (born 1997)

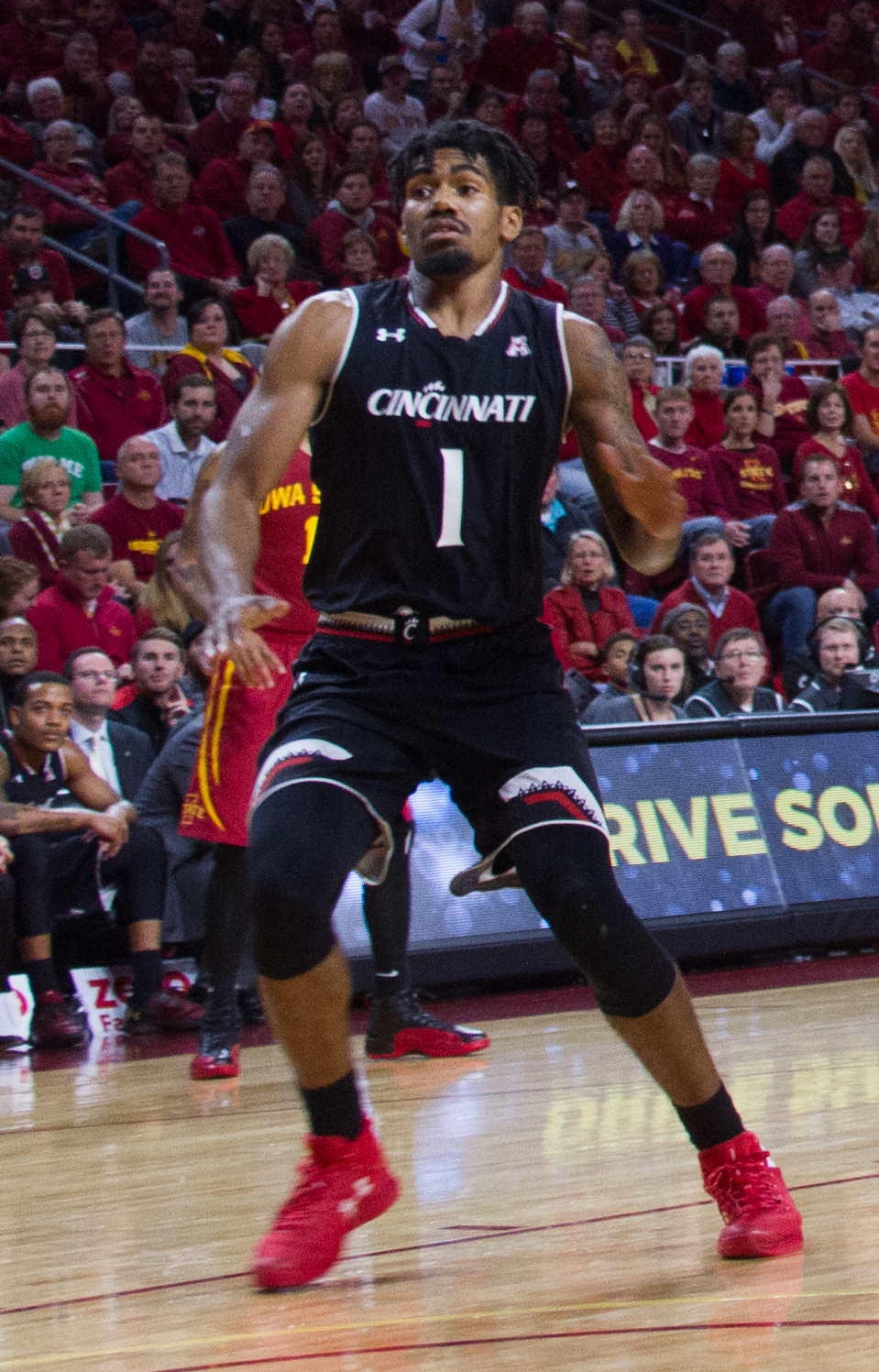
- Evans with Cincinnati in 2016

Free agent
- Position: Shooting guard

Personal information
- Born: June 18, 1997 (age 29) Jacksonville, North Carolina, U.S.
- Listed height: 6 ft 4 in (1.93 m)
- Listed weight: 210 lb (95 kg)

Career information
- High school: St. Michael the Archangel (Baton Rouge, Louisiana)
- College: Cincinnati (2015–2018)
- NBA draft: 2018: 1st round, 28th overall pick
- Drafted by: Golden State Warriors
- Playing career: 2018–present

Career history
- 2018–2020: Golden State Warriors
- 2018–2020: →Santa Cruz Warriors
- 2020: Minnesota Timberwolves
- 2020: →Iowa Wolves
- 2021–2022: Santa Cruz Warriors
- 2024: Edmonton Stingers
- 2024–2025: Olomoucko
- 2025: Slovan Bratislava
- 2026: Pardubice

Career highlights
- First-team All-AAC (2018)
- Stats at NBA.com
- Stats at Basketball Reference

Jacob Evans III (born June 18, 1997) is an American professional basketball player who last played for Pardubice of the Slovak Basketball League. He played college basketball for the Cincinnati Bearcats. As a junior in 2018, he earned first-team all-conference honors in the American Athletic Conference (AAC). He was selected by the Golden State Warriors in the first round of the 2018 NBA draft with the 28th overall pick.

In 2023, Evans was indicted in Ohio on a charge of non-support of dependents related to unpaid child support. In 2023, he was sentenced to probation, as prosecutors alleged he had accrued more than $300,000 in unpaid child support.

== College career ==
A 6 ft 6 in (1.98 m) guard from Baton Rouge, Louisiana, he was a consensus four-star prospect in the 2015 high school class. Evans averaged 8.4 points per game as a freshman coming off the bench for Cincinnati. He improved his scoring average to 13.5 points per game as a sophomore.

As a junior, Evans was named first-team All-AAC alongside teammate Gary Clark, and he was a finalist for the Julius Erving Small Forward of the Year Award. In the NCAA tournament, Evans scored 19 points, mostly in the first half, in the 75–73 Round of 32 upset loss to Nevada. Evans averaged 13.0 points, 4.7 rebounds, 3.1 assists and 1.3 steals per game as a junior. He led the Bearcats to a 31–5 season and earning a No. 2 seed in the NCAA tournament. After the season, he declared for the 2018 NBA draft.

== Professional career ==
=== Golden State Warriors (2018–2020) ===
Evans was drafted by the Golden State Warriors in the first round with the 28th overall pick. On July 2, 2018, he signed with the Warriors. The Warriors made it to the Finals in his rookie year, but were defeated in the 2019 NBA Finals in six games by the Toronto Raptors.

On October 24, 2019, Evans scored a career-high 14 points in a 122–141 loss against the Los Angeles Clippers.

=== Minnesota Timberwolves (2020) ===
On February 6, 2020, Evans was traded to the Minnesota Timberwolves as part of a deal for Andrew Wiggins.

On November 24, 2020, Evans was traded to the New York Knicks. The Knicks waived Evans on December 9.

=== Erie BayHawks (2021) ===
On January 26, 2021, Evans signed with the Erie BayHawks of the NBA G League. He was waived on February 2 after the BayHawks acquired Jordan Bell.

=== Santa Cruz Warriors (2021–2022) ===
On February 23, 2021, Evans signed with the Santa Cruz Warriors and played four games for them at the end of the season in the playoff bubble.

On August 6, 2021, Evans signed with Hapoel Eilat B.C. of the Israeli Basketball Premier League, but he was released before playing in a game for the team. He joined Santa Cruz again, following his release.

=== Edmonton Stingers (2024) ===
On May 9, 2024, Evans signed with Edmonton Stingers of the Canadian Elite Basketball League.

=== Olomoucko (2024–2025) ===
On November 20, 2024, Evans signed with BK Redstone Olomoucko of the National Basketball League.

=== Slovan Bratislava (2025) ===
On October 17, 2025, Evans was released. In four games he averaged 7 points, 3.8 rebounds, and 2.5 assists per game. He played 1 game in European North Basketball League but he did not score anything and had only 1 rebound and 1 block.

== Career statistics ==
Legend
GP	Games played	GS	Games started	MPG	Minutes per game
FG%	Field goal percentage	3P%	3-point field goal percentage	FT%	Free throw percentage
RPG	Rebounds per game	APG	Assists per game	SPG	Steals per game
BPG	Blocks per game	PPG	Points per game	**Bold**	Career high

=== NBA ===
==== Regular season ====
Year	Team	GP	GS	MPG	FG%	3P%	FT%	RPG	APG	SPG	BPG	PPG
2018–19	Golden State	**30**	**1**	6.8	**.340**	.267	.000	.8	.8	.2	.1	1.3
2019–20	Golden State	27	**1**	**15.3**	.338	**.342**	**.862**	**1.5**	**1.1**	**.4**	**.4**	**4.7**
2019–20	Minnesota	2	0	2.0	.000	000	—	.0	.0	.0	.0	.0
Career		59	2	10.5	.337	.315	.833	1.1	.9	.3	.3	2.8

==== Playoffs ====
Year	Team	GP	GS	MPG	FG%	3P%	FT%	RPG	APG	SPG	BPG	PPG
2019	Golden State	7	0	2.6	.400	.500	—	.1	.1	.0	.0	.7
Career		7	0	2.6	.400	.500	—	.1	.1	.0	.0	.7

=== College ===
Year	Team	GP	GS	MPG	FG%	3P%	FT%	RPG	APG	SPG	BPG	PPG
2015–16	Cincinnati	33	8	24.4	.372	.333	**.804**	4.1	1.6	.8	.8	8.4
2016–17	Cincinnati	**36**	**36**	**31.6**	**.473**	**.418**	.732	4.2	2.7	**1.3**	.8	**13.5**
2017–18	Cincinnati	**36**	**36**	30.8	.427	.370	.754	**4.7**	**3.1**	**1.3**	**1.0**	13.0
Career		105	80	29.1	.429	.377	.755	4.3	2.5	1.1	.9	11.7
