= Gary Clark (basketball) =

American basketball player (born 1994)

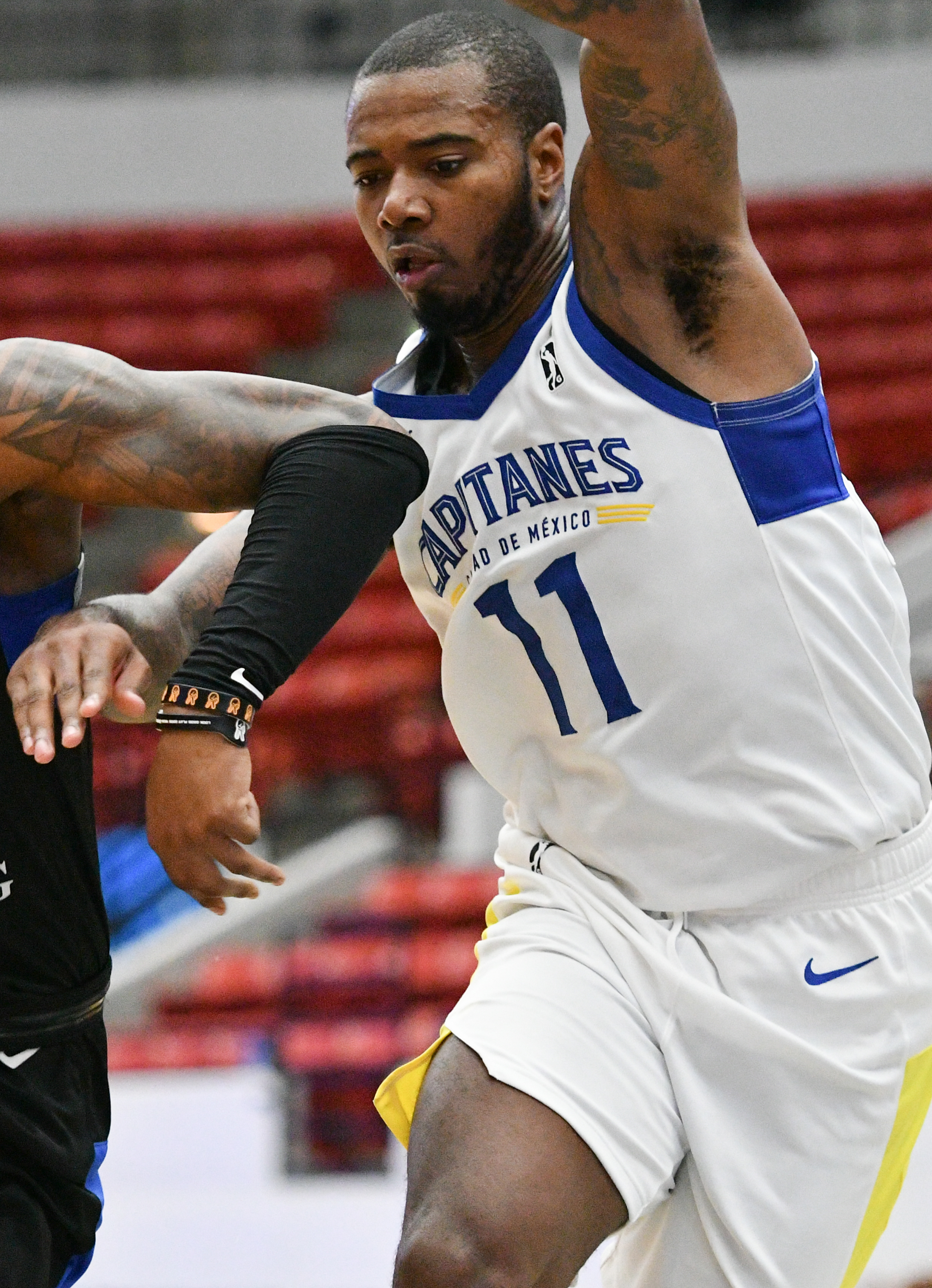
- Clark with the Mexico City Capitanes in 2021

No. 8 – Yokohama B-Corsairs
- Position: Power forward
- League: B.League

Personal information
- Born: November 16, 1994 (age 31) Smithfield, North Carolina, U.S.
- Listed height: 6 ft 7 in (2.01 m)
- Listed weight: 225 lb (102 kg)

Career information
- High school: Clayton (Clayton, North Carolina)
- College: Cincinnati (2014–2018)
- NBA draft: 2018: undrafted
- Playing career: 2018–present

Career history
- 2018–2020: Houston Rockets
- 2019: →Rio Grande Valley Vipers
- 2020–2021: Orlando Magic
- 2021: Denver Nuggets
- 2021: Philadelphia 76ers
- 2021: Mexico City Capitanes
- 2021–2022: New Orleans Pelicans
- 2022–2023: Mexico City Capitanes
- 2023–2024: Illawarra Hawks
- 2024–present: Yokohama B-Corsairs

Career highlights
- All-NBL First Team (2024); NBA G League champion (2019); AAC Player of the Year (2018); First-team All-AAC (2018); Second-team All-AAC (2016); 2× AAC Defensive Player of the Year (2016, 2018); AAC tournament MVP (2018)
- Stats at NBA.com
- Stats at Basketball Reference
Medals
Men's basketball
Representing United States
FIBA AmeriCup
Bronze medal – third place	2022 Brazil

Gary Clark Jr. (born November 16, 1994) is an American professional basketball player for the Yokohama B-Corsairs of the Japanese B.League. He played college basketball for the Cincinnati Bearcats where he was named the American Athletic Conference Player of the Year for the 2017–18 season. He made his NBA debut in 2018 and played in four straight seasons across multiple teams, including the Houston Rockets, Orlando Magic, Denver Nuggets, Philadelphia 76ers, and New Orleans Pelicans.

== High school career ==
Clark was born in Smithfield, North Carolina. He played basketball at Clayton High School in Clayton, North Carolina, where he left as the school's all-time leading scorer, rebounder and shot-blocker. He is also the only North Carolina high school player to record a quadruple-double. Clark was ranked as the No. 100 overall prospect by ESPN, No. 87 by Rivals and No. 90 by 247sports. He committed to Cincinnati on September 18, 2013, after receiving a scholarship offer from NC State.

== College career ==
Clark made an immediate impact for Cincinnati, entering the starting lineup from day one and becoming the first freshman to start a season opener for the program since Lance Stephenson. At the close of the American Athletic Conference (AAC) season, he was named to the league's all-rookie team. Clark posted 7.8 points, 7.2 rebounds, 1.0 steal and 1.3 blocks per game as a freshman.

In his sophomore season, Clark developed into one of the top defensive players in the AAC. After averaging 10.4 points, 8.8 rebounds, 1.2 steals and 1.5 blocks per game, he was named second-team All-AAC and the conference Defensive Player of the Year. Prior to his junior year, Clark was named to the preseason All-AAC first team. He averaged 10.8 points and 7.9 rebounds per game as a junior.

At the close of his senior season, Clark was named AAC Player of the Year and Defensive Player of the Year. He averaged 12.7 points, 8.0 rebounds, and 1.3 blocks per game. Clark led Cincinnati to an AAC regular season title. He was the AAC tournament Most Outstanding Player after averaging 16.3 points and 11.7 rebounds in the conference tournament. Clark hit a game-winning free throw with four seconds in regulation to secure a 56–55 victory for the Bearcats in the title game.

== Professional career ==
=== Houston Rockets (2018–2020) ===
After going undrafted in the 2018 NBA draft, Clark signed a two-way contract with the Houston Rockets on July 5, 2018. On December 6, 2018, his contract was converted to a standard NBA contract. During the 2018–19 season, he appeared in 51 regular season games and two playoff games for the Rockets. He also played 10 games with the Rockets' NBA G League affiliate, the Rio Grande Valley Vipers.

After playing for the Rockets in the 2019 NBA Summer League, Clark re-joined the team for the 2019–20 season. In November 2019, he had three stints in the G League with the Vipers. On January 7, 2020, he was waived by the Rockets.

=== Orlando Magic (2020–2021) ===
On January 14, 2020, Clark signed a 10-day contract with the Orlando Magic. He signed a second 10-day contract on January 29, and a rest-of-season contract on February 8.

On November 23, 2020, Clark re-signed with the Magic.

=== Denver Nuggets (2021) ===
On March 25, 2021, Clark and Aaron Gordon were traded to the Denver Nuggets in exchange for Gary Harris, R. J. Hampton, and a future first round pick. On April 9, he was waived after making two appearances.

=== Philadelphia 76ers (2021) ===
On May 11, 2021, Clark signed a two-way contract with the Philadelphia 76ers. He made two appearances for the 76ers, recording averages of 1.0 rebounds, 0.5 assists, and 0.5 steals.

=== Mexico City Capitanes (2021) ===
In November 2021, Clark joined the Mexico City Capitanes of the NBA G League. In eight games to start the 2021–22 season, he averaged 14.4 points, 6.9 rebounds, and 1.1 assists in 31.3 minutes per contest.

=== New Orleans Pelicans (2021–2022) ===
On December 3, 2021, Clark signed with the New Orleans Pelicans, becoming the first Capitanes' player ever to receive an NBA call-up. On January 7, 2022, he was waived by the Pelicans. Two days later, he re-signed with the Pelicans on a two-way contract.

=== Return to Mexico City (2022–2023) ===
In November 2022, Clark re-joined the Mexico City Capitanes for the 2022–23 NBA G League season.

=== Illawarra Hawks (2023–2024) ===
On June 24, 2023, Clark signed with the Illawarra Hawks in Australia for the 2023–24 NBL season.

=== Yokohama B-Corsairs (2024–present) ===
On June 13, 2024, Clark was selected by the Valley Suns in the 2024 NBA G League expansion draft. On August 6, he signed with the Yokohama B-Corsairs of the Japanese B.League.

== Career statistics ==
Legend
GP	Games played	GS	Games started	MPG	Minutes per game
FG%	Field goal percentage	3P%	3-point field goal percentage	FT%	Free throw percentage
RPG	Rebounds per game	APG	Assists per game	SPG	Steals per game
BPG	Blocks per game	PPG	Points per game	**Bold**	Career high

=== NBA ===
==== Regular season ====
Year	Team	GP	GS	MPG	FG%	3P%	FT%	RPG	APG	SPG	BPG	PPG
2018–19	Houston	**51**	2	12.6	.331	.297	**1.000**	2.3	.4	.4	.5	2.9
2019–20	Houston	18	0	11.8	.390	.353	.857	2.2	.7	.1	.4	**3.9**
2019–20	Orlando	24	5	14.8	**.419**	.350	**1.000**	2.9	.2	.2	**.6**	3.6
2020–21	Orlando	35	**11**	**18.2**	.305	.287	.800	**3.2**	**.9**	.3	.2	3.4
2020–21	Denver	2	0	2.0	–	–	–	.5	.0	.0	.0	0.0
2020–21	Philadelphia	2	0	6.5	.000	.000	–	1.0	.5	**.5**	.0	0.0
2021–22	New Orleans	38	1	9.9	.375	**.400**	.700	2.4	.5	.3	.2	2.7
Career		170	19	13.2	.351	.326	.838	2.5	.5	.3	.4	3.1

==== Playoffs ====
Year	Team	GP	GS	MPG	FG%	3P%	FT%	RPG	APG	SPG	BPG	PPG
2019	Houston	2	0	2.0	–	–	–	.5	.0	.0	.0	.0
2020	Orlando	**5**	**5**	**28.8**	**.333**	**.344**	**.800**	**5.6**	**1.4**	**1.0**	**.4**	**7.4**
Career		7	5	21.1	.333	.344	.800	4.1	1.0	.7	.3	5.3

=== College ===
Year	Team	GP	GS	MPG	FG%	3P%	FT%	RPG	APG	SPG	BPG	PPG
2014–15	Cincinnati	34	34	27.8	.524	.000	.625	7.2	1.7	1.0	1.3	7.8
2015–16	Cincinnati	33	32	**30.4**	.519	**.520**	.687	**8.8**	**2.1**	1.2	**1.5**	10.4
2016–17	Cincinnati	**36**	35	28.6	**.529**	.286	.697	7.9	**2.1**	1.0	1.2	10.8
2017–18	Cincinnati	**36**	**36**	28.5	.526	.435	**.741**	8.7	**2.1**	**1.4**	1.2	**12.9**
Career		139	137	28.8	.525	.383	.698	8.1	2.0	1.2	1.3	10.5
