= Larry Davis (basketball) =

American basketball coach

Biographical details
- Born: June 3, 1956 (age 70); Mount Sterling, Kentucky, U.S.
- Education: Asbury ('78)

Coaching career (HC unless noted)
- 1979–1982: East Tennessee State (asst.)
- 1982–1983: Cloverport HS
- 1983–1985: Oak Hill Academy
- 1985–1989: Delaware (asst.)
- 1989–1993: Wake Forest (asst.)
- 1993–1994: Ball State (asst.)
- 1994–1997: Minnesota (asst.)
- 1997–2006: Furman
- 2006–2018: Cincinnati (assoc. HC)
- 2014–2015: Cincinnati (interim HC)
- 2019: Lincoln Academy

Head coaching record
- Overall: 124–139 (college); 63–24 (high school)

Larry Davis (June 3, 1956) is an American men's college basketball coach, most recently serving as the co-associate head coach at the University of Cincinnati.

== Early life ==
Davis was born in Mount Sterling, Kentucky. After moving to Indiana as a child, he graduated from Wapahani High School in Selma, Indiana in 1974. Following high school, he attended Asbury College, in Wilmore, Kentucky, from which he graduated in 1978. The following year, he enrolled in a graduate program at East Tennessee State University and began his coaching career as a graduate assistant. Before coming to Cincinnati, Davis served as head coach at Furman University from 1997 to 2006 where he compiled a 124–139 record.

== Coaching career ==
From East Tennessee State, Davis moved on to coach high school teams, first at Cloverport High School, and then Oak Hill Academy, a prep school located at Mouth of Wilson, Virginia. His single season at Cloverport compiled a 12–15 record.

Davis temporarily served as interim coach for the final 25 games of the 2014-15 team while head coach Mick Cronin was sidelined with a health issue. The Bearcats went 16–9 during the regular season with a 23–11 mark at season's end, finishing tied for third place in the American Athletic Conference and the school's fifth consecutive appearance in the NCAA Tournament. Davis was the first interim coach at the NCAA tournament since Missouri's Rich Daly and Michigan's Steve Fisher in 1989. He also became the first non-head coach to lead a team through multiple games of a regular season and into the NCAA tournament since 1961 (Jake McCandless at Princeton).

On September 13, 2018, Davis resigned from his position as associate head coach of Cincinnati. In October 2018, it was revealed that Davis resigned over an alleged assault on a plane in September 2017. A federal court in North Carolina would ultimately sentence Davis to two years probation for the incident.

Davis was hired as the head coach of Lincoln Academy, a charter school hosted at Winston-Salem Christian School in Winston-Salem, North Carolina. The school was suddenly closed on September 5, 2019, as a part of the MyPayrollHR fraud scheme.
