= Troy Caupain =

American basketball player (born 1995)

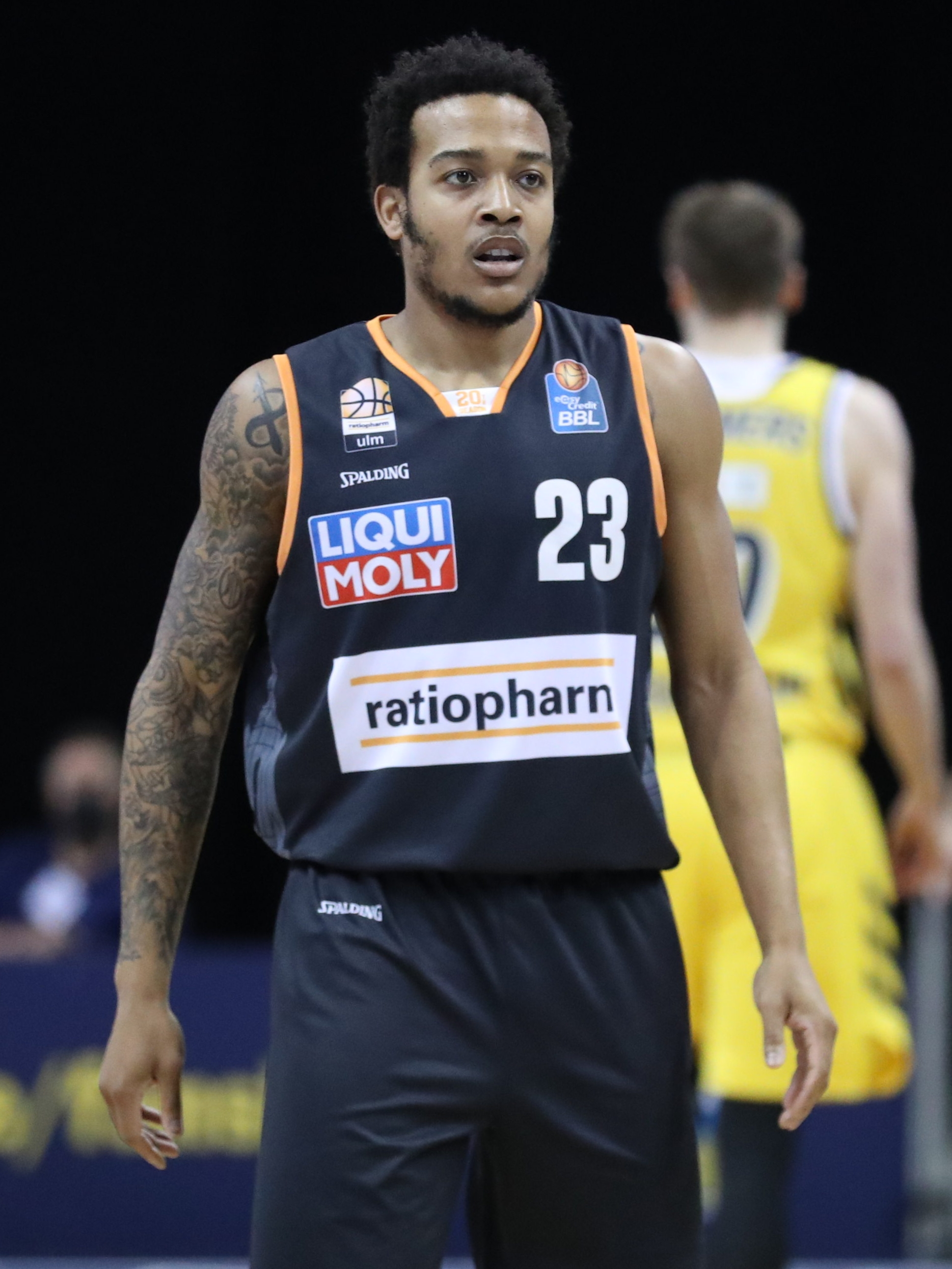
- Caupain with ratiopharm Ulm in 2021

No. 10 – Pallacanestro Reggiana
- Position: Point guard
- League: LBA; BCL

Personal information
- Born: November 29, 1995 (age 30) New York City, New York, U.S.
- Listed height: 6 ft 4 in (1.93 m)
- Listed weight: 210 lb (95 kg)

Career information
- High school: Cosby (Midlothian, Virginia)
- College: Cincinnati (2013–2017)
- NBA draft: 2017: undrafted
- Playing career: 2017–present

Career history
- 2017–2018: Lakeland Magic
- 2018: GSA Udine
- 2018–2019: Orlando Magic
- 2018–2019: →Lakeland Magic
- 2019–2020: Hapoel Holon
- 2020: Filou Oostende
- 2020–2021: ratiopharm Ulm
- 2021–2022: Darüşşafaka
- 2022–2023: Leonessa Brescia
- 2023–2025: UCAM Murcia
- 2025: SIG Strasbourg
- 2025–2026: Reggio Emilia
- 2026: Trabzonspor
- 2026–present: Reggio Emilia

Career highlights
- First-team All-AAC (2016); Second-team All-AAC (2017)
- Stats at NBA.com
- Stats at Basketball Reference

Troy Wendel Caupain Jr. (born November 29, 1995) is an American professional basketball player for Reggio Emilia of the Lega Basket Serie A (LBA) and the Basketball Champions League (BCL). He played college basketball for Cincinnati.

== High school career ==
Caupain attended Cosby High School and started on the basketball team as a sophomore, averaging 7 points per game. Moving to point guard, he scored 25.7 points per game and was named All-Metro as a junior. As a senior, he scored 26 points and pulled down 15.1 rebounds per game. Caupain was named All-Metro player of the year.

== College career ==
In Caupain's freshman season at Cincinnati, he served as a backup to star Sean Kilpatrick and participated in the team's asphyxiating defense. As a sophomore, Caupain averaged 9.4 points and 3.6 assists per game. He was named Honorable Mention All-AAC. As a junior, he was named to the First Team All-AAC. Caupain led the team in scoring and assists with 13.0 points and 4.8 assists per game while contributing to a 22–11 season.

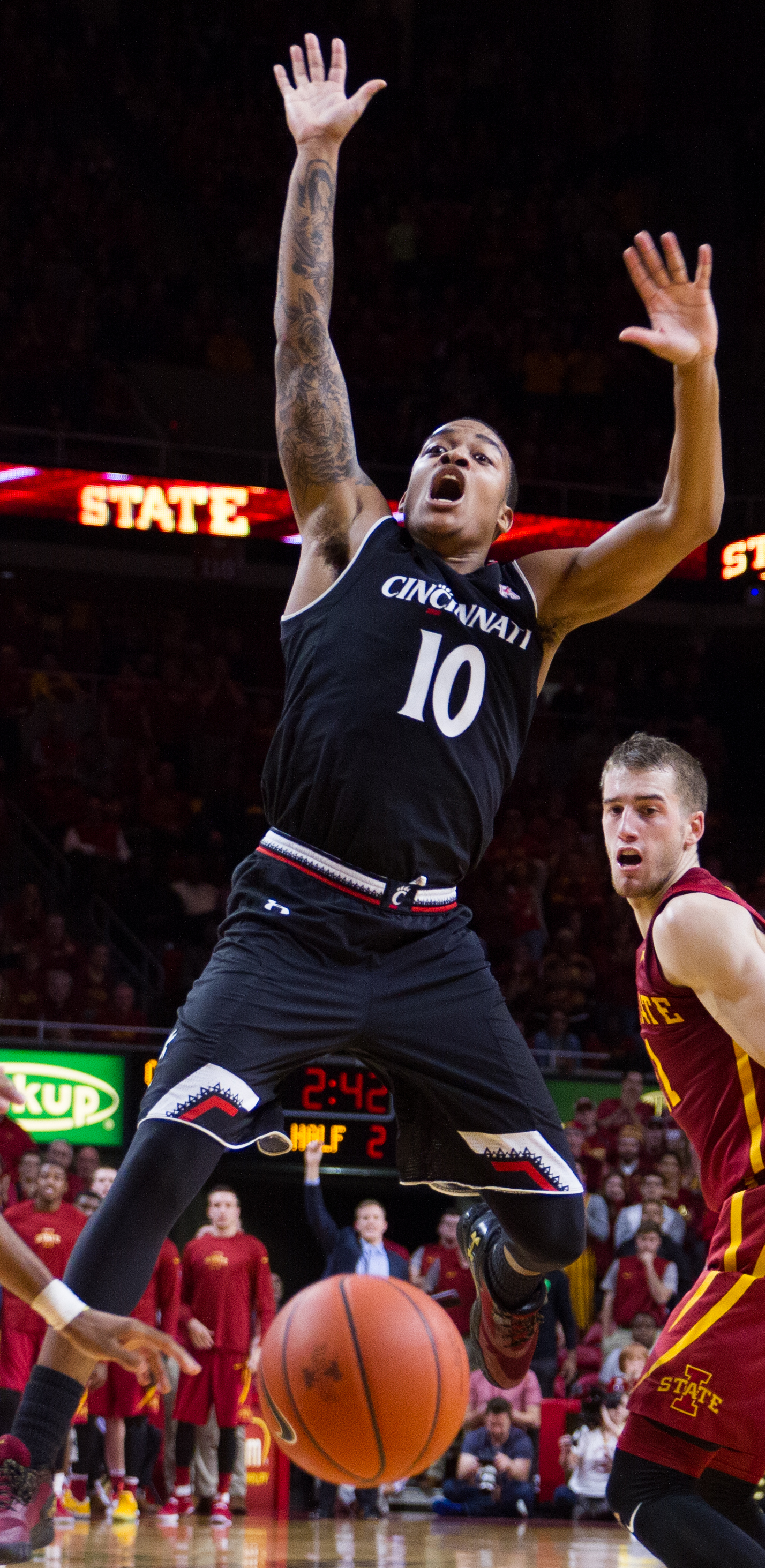
Caupain with Cincinnati in December 2016

Coming into his senior year, Cincinnati was picked to win the AAC regular season title and Caupain was voted as AAC Preseason Co-Player of the Year. He averaged 10.5 points, 4.6 rebounds and 4.4 assists in 2016–17, finishing sixth in Division 1 with a 3.36-to-1 assist to turnover ratio. Caupain was named first team NABC All-District 25 and Second Team All-AAC. He helped lead the Bearcats to a 30–6 record and the university's seventh consecutive NCAA Tournament appearance. In his career, he had a school-record 515 assists and scored 1,317 points, tying Cashmere Wright for 22nd place on the school all-time scoring list.

== Professional career ==
After going undrafted in the 2017 NBA draft, Caupain signed a summer league contract with the NBA's Toronto Raptors and received a subsequent training camp invite from the Orlando Magic on August 31, however, he was waived on October 13. Ten days later, he was acquired by the Lakeland Magic of the NBA G League, averaging 15.8 points, 7.5 rebounds, 5.7 assists and 1.4 steals in 51 games.

On April 4, 2018, after the conclusion of the G League season, Caupain signed with G.S.A. Udine of the Italian Serie A2 Basket.

On July 11, 2018, Caupain signed a two-way contract with the Orlando Magic. Under the terms of the deal, Caupain split time with Orlando and their NBA G League affiliate, the Lakeland Magic. Caupain made his NBA debut on December 31, 2018, in a 125–100 loss to the Charlotte Hornets, scoring five points with two assists in five minutes of playing time.

On September 12, 2019, Caupain joined the Portland Trail Blazers for training camp. On October 18, 2019, the Trail Blazers waived Caupain.

On November 3, 2019, Caupain signed a one-year deal with Hapoel Holon of the Israeli Premier League. On December 28, 2019, Caupain recorded 23 points, while shooting 8-of-12 from the field, along with six rebounds and four assists in an 84–91 loss to Hapoel Jerusalem. On February 6, 2020, he parted ways with Holon.

On February 21, 2020, Caupain signed with Filou Oostende of the Belgian Pro Basketball League.

On July 31, 2020, he has signed with ratiopharm Ulm of the German Basketball Bundesliga.

On June 30, 2021, he has signed with Darüşşafaka Tekfen of the Basketball Super League.

On July 7, 2022, he has signed with Pallacanestro Brescia of Lega Basket Serie A.

On July 13, 2023, he signed with UCAM Murcia of the Spanish Liga ACB.

On June 1, 2025, he signed with SIG Strasbourg of the French LNB Pro A.

On June 16, 2025, he signed with Pallacanestro Reggiana of the Italian Lega Basket Serie A (LBA).

On June 3, 2026, he signed with Trabzonspor of the Basketbol Süper Ligi (BSL).

On November 2, 2026, he signed with Pallacanestro Reggiana of the Italian Lega Basket Serie A (LBA).

== Career statistics ==
Legend
| GP | Games played | GS | Games started | MPG | Minutes per game |
| FG% | Field goal percentage | 3P% | 3-point field goal percentage | FT% | Free throw percentage |
| RPG | Rebounds per game | APG | Assists per game | SPG | Steals per game |
| BPG | Blocks per game | PPG | Points per game | **Bold** | Career high |

=== NBA ===
==== Regular season ====
| Year | Team | GP | GS | MPG | FG% | 3P% | FT% | RPG | APG | SPG | BPG | PPG |
|---|---|---|---|---|---|---|---|---|---|---|---|---|
| 2018–19 | Orlando | 4 | 0 | 4.0 | .500 | .667 | – | .8 | 1.0 | .3 | .0 | 2.5 |
| Career | | 4 | 0 | 4.0 | .500 | .667 | – | .8 | 1.0 | .3 | .0 | 2.5 |

=== College ===
| Year | Team | GP | GS | MPG | FG% | 3P% | FT% | RPG | APG | SPG | BPG | PPG |
|---|---|---|---|---|---|---|---|---|---|---|---|---|
| 2013–14 | Cincinnati | 34 | 0 | 19.1 | .380 | .328 | .784 | 2.3 | 2.2 | .9 | .1 | 5.4 |
| 2014–15 | Cincinnati | 34 | 33 | 31.3 | **.444** | **.408** | **.788** | 3.6 | 3.6 | **1.2** | .2 | 9.6 |
| 2015–16 | Cincinnati | 33 | 33 | **33.5** | .375 | .324 | **.788** | 3.8 | **4.8** | 1.1 | **.4** | **13.0** |
| 2016–17 | Cincinnati | **36** | **36** | 32.3 | .394 | .325 | .687 | **4.6** | 4.4 | **1.2** | .3 | 10.5 |
| Career | | 137 | 102 | 29.1 | .397 | .338 | .762 | 3.6 | 3.8 | 1.1 | .2 | 9.6 |

== Personal life ==
Caupain's cousin is Jaylen Adams.
