= Coreontae DeBerry =

American basketball player

No. 23 – Vitória SC Basquetebol
- Position: Power forward
- League: LEB

Personal information
- Born: September 2, 1994 (age 32) Saginaw, Michigan
- Listed height: 6 ft 10 in (2.08 m)
- Listed weight: 265 lb (120 kg)

Career information
- High school: Holland (Holland, Michigan)
- College: Hutchinson CC (2012–2014); Cincinnati (2014–2016)
- NBA draft: 2016: undrafted
- Playing career: 2016–present

Career history
- 2016: Mono Vampire
- 2016–2017: Windy City Bulls
- 2017–2018: FC Schalke 04
- 2018–2021: Portugal (LPB)
- 2021–present: C.B. Tizona

Career highlights
- Thailand Basketball League champion (2016)

Coreontae Lamar DeBerry (born 2 September 1994) is an American professional basketball player.

As a freshman at college, he measured 6-foot-9, 260 pounds and was considered an intriguing prospect at Mott Community College, which was considered as the 2nd best school in the United States at that time. After graduation, he went on to play for the Cincinnati Bearcats.

After College, his first professional team was in the Thailand Basketball League, where he led his team to the national championship. He went on to play professionally in the United States, Canada, Germany and Portugal.
