= Shaquille Thomas =

American basketball player (born 1992)

Personal information
- Born: March 25, 1992 (age 34) Paterson, New Jersey, U.S.
- Listed height: 6 ft 7 in (2.01 m)
- Listed weight: 205 lb (93 kg)

Career information
- High school: NIA Prep (Newark, New Jersey)
- College: Cincinnati (2012–2016)
- NBA draft: 2016: undrafted
- Playing career: 2016–2023
- Position: Small forward

Career history
- 2016: Austin Spurs
- 2017: Gimnasio Indalo
- 2017–2018: Memphis Hustle
- 2019: Kordall Steelers
- 2019: Hawke's Bay Hawks
- 2019–2020: S.C. Lusitânia EXPERT
- 2020: KTP Basket
- 2020–2021: Pyrintö
- 2021: Oliveirense
- 2021: BC Prievidza
- 2021–2022: Al-Ahli Amman
- 2022–2023: Al-Nuwaidrat Manama

Shaquille Thomas (born March 25, 1992) is an American former professional basketball player. He played college basketball for Cincinnati.

== Early life ==
Thomas was a four-star recruit out of NIA Prep. He averaged 28 points and eight assists per game as a senior.

== College career ==
Thomas redshirted his freshman season at Cincinnati and gradually increased his playing time. As a sophomore, he posted 6.8 points per game. As a junior, he averaged 6.4 points and 2.9 rebounds. He had a three-game stretch as a junior in which he scored 18 points at Houston, 13 points against UCF and 11 points at Tulane. As a senior, he played 28 games and averaged 6.1 points, 3.8 rebounds, and 1.4 assists per game. He sprained his right ankle in the Bearcats' 58–57 win at Connecticut on January 28, 2016, and missed some time.

== Professional career ==
After not being chosen in the 2016 NBA draft, Thomas joined the Austin Spurs of the NBA Development League, with whom he played five games with before leaving in December. In February 2017, he signed with Gimnasio Indalo in Argentina as a temporary injury replacement. He played six games, in which he averaged 4.5 points and 2.3 rebounds.

For the 2017–18 season, Thomas was acquired by the Memphis Hustle. He averaged 6.1 points and 3.4 rebounds per game with the Hustle. Thomas missed a game in March 2018 due to a bicep injury.

In January 2019, Thomas moved to Luxembourg and joined the Kordall Steelers. In April 2019, he joined the Hawke's Bay Hawks in New Zealand as a temporary import stand-in for Brandon Bowman.

On August 25, 2019, he has signed with S.C. Lusitânia EXPERT of the Liga Portuguesa de Basquetebol.

In 2020, Thomas signed with BC Prievidza of the Slovak league. On December 27, 2021, Thomas signed with Al-Ahli Amman of the Jordanian Premier Basketball League.

== Personal life ==
Thomas has an older sister, Essence Carson, who is a WNBA player. His uncle, Tim Thomas, played in the NBA.
