= 2019–20 Oklahoma Sooners men's basketball team =

American college basketball season

2019–20 Oklahoma Sooners men's basketball
- Conference: Big 12 Conference
- Record: 19–12 (9–9 Big 12)
- Head coach: Lon Kruger (9th season)
- Assistant coaches: Jim Molinari; Carlin Hartman; Pooh Williamson
- Home arena: Lloyd Noble Center

2019–20 Big 12 men's basketball standings
	Conf.				Overall
Team	W		L	PCT	W		L	PCT
No. 1 Kansas	17	–	1	.944	28	–	3	.903
No. 5 Baylor	15	–	3	.833	26	–	4	.867
No. 24 West Virginia	9	–	9	.500	21	–	10	.677
Texas	9	–	9	.500	19	–	12	.613
Oklahoma	9	–	9	.500	19	–	12	.613
Texas Tech	9	–	9	.500	18	–	13	.581
TCU	7	–	11	.389	16	–	16	.500
Oklahoma State	7	–	11	.389	18	–	14	.563
Iowa State	5	–	13	.278	12	–	20	.375
Kansas State	3	–	15	.167	11	–	21	.344
Note: The 2020 Big 12 Tournament was canceled prior to the quarterfinals due to the COVID-19 pandemic. Rankings from AP poll

The 2019–20 Oklahoma Sooners basketball team represented the University of Oklahoma in the 2019–20 NCAA Division I men's basketball season. They were led by ninth-year head coach Lon Kruger and played their home games at the Lloyd Noble Center in Norman, Oklahoma as a member of the Big 12 Conference.

== Previous season ==
The Sooners finished the 2018–19 season with an overall record of 20–14, 7–11 in Big 12 play to finish in a tie for seventh place. They lost in the First Round of the Big 12 tournament to West Virginia. They received an at-large bid to the NCAA tournament where they lost in the Second Round to Virginia.

== Offseason ==
=== Departures ===
Name	Number	Pos.	Height	Weight	Year	Hometown	Reason for departure
Christian James	0	G	6'4"	211	Senior	Houston, TX	Graduated
Rashard Odomes	1	F	6'6"	217	Senior	Copperas Cove, TX	Graduated
Aaron Calixte	2	G	5'11"	187	Graduate Student	Stoughton, MA	Graduated
Miles Reynolds	3	G	6'2"	170	Graduate Student	Chicago, IL	Graduated
Jamuuni McNeace	4	C	6'10"	222	Senior	Allen, TX	Graduated
Matt Freeman	5	F	6'10"	229	RS Junior	Auckland, New Zealand	Transferred to UC Santa Barbara
Ty Lazenby	14	G	6'5"	209	Senior	Glencoe, OK	Transferred to Oral Roberts
Patrick Geha	22	F	6'5"	212	Senior	Leawood, KS	Walk on; graduated
Hannes Pöllä	44	C	6'11"	271	Sophomore	Lahti, Finland	Transferred to UT Martin

=== Incoming transfers ===
Name	Number	Pos.	Height	Weight	Year	Hometown	Previous School
Corbin Merritt	2	C	6'9"	245	RS Sophomore	Tallahassee, FL	Junior college transferred from Daytona State College.
Alondes Williams	15	G	6'5"	205	Junior	Milwaukee, WI	Junior college transferred from Triton College.

=== 2019 recruiting class ===
College recruiting information
Name	Hometown	School	Height	Weight	Commit date
Jalen Hill; SF	Las Vegas, NV	Clark	6 ft 6 in (1.98 m)	180 lb (82 kg)	Sep 20, 2018
Jalen Hill; SF	Recruit ratings: Scout: Rivals: 247Sports:				
Victor Iwuakor; F	Abuja, Nigeria	Sulphur Springs	6 ft 7 in (2.01 m)	230 lb (100 kg)	Sep 19, 2018
Victor Iwuakor; F	Recruit ratings: Scout: Rivals: 247Sports:				
De'Vion Harmon; G	Denton, TX	John Guyer	6 ft 1 in (1.85 m)	190 lb (86 kg)	Nov 13, 2017
De'Vion Harmon; G	Recruit ratings: Scout: Rivals: 247Sports:				
Rick Issanza; C	Kinshasa, Congo	Bella Vista Prep	7 ft 1 in (2.16 m)	224 lb (102 kg)	May 23, 2019
Rick Issanza; C	Recruit ratings: Scout: Rivals: 247Sports:				
Anyang Garang; F	Adelaide, Australia	NBA Global Academy	6 ft 9 in (2.06 m)	210 lb (95 kg)	Jan 11, 2019
Anyang Garang; F	Recruit ratings: Scout: Rivals: 247Sports:				
Overall recruit ranking:
Note: In many cases, Scout, Rivals, 247Sports, On3, and ESPN may conflict in their listings of height and weight.; In these cases, the average was taken. ESPN grades are on a 100-point scale.; Sources: "2019 Team Ranking". Rivals.

=== 2020 Recruiting class ===
College recruiting information (2020)
Name	Hometown	School	Height	Weight	Commit date
Trey Phipps #49 SG	Tulsa, OK	Booker T. Washington	6 ft 2 in (1.88 m)	170 lb (77 kg)	Aug 1, 2019
Trey Phipps #49 SG	Recruit ratings: Scout: Rivals: 247Sports:				
Overall recruit ranking:
Note: In many cases, Scout, Rivals, 247Sports, On3, and ESPN may conflict in their listings of height and weight.; In these cases, the average was taken. ESPN grades are on a 100-point scale.; Sources: "2019 Team Ranking". Rivals.

== Roster ==
2019–20 Oklahoma Sooners men's basketball team
Players
Coaches

Pos.	#	Name	Height	Weight	Year	Previous school	Hometown
F	0	Victor Iwuakor	6 ft 7 in (2.01 m)	216 lb (98 kg)	Fr	Sulphur Springs	Abuja, Nigeria
F	1	Jalen Hill	6 ft 7 in (2.01 m)	225 lb (102 kg)	Fr	Clark	Las Vegas, NV
C	2	Corbin Merritt	6 ft 9 in (2.06 m)	245 lb (111 kg)	RS So	Daytona State College	Tallahassee, FL
G	11	De'Vion Harmon	6 ft 1 in (1.85 m)	201 lb (91 kg)	Fr	John Guyer	Denton, TX
G	12	Austin Reaves	6 ft 5 in (1.96 m)	202 lb (92 kg)	RS Jr	Wichita State	Newark, AR
F	13	Anyang Garang (redshirt)	6 ft 8 in (2.03 m)	190 lb (86 kg)	Fr	NBA Global Academy	Adelaide, Australia
G	15	Alondes Williams	6 ft 5 in (1.96 m)	205 lb (93 kg)	Jr	Triton College	Milwaukee, WI
C	20	Rick Issanza (redshirt)	7 ft 1 in (2.16 m)	230 lb (104 kg)	Fr	Bella Vista Prep	Kinshasa, Congo
F	21	Kristian Doolittle	6 ft 7 in (2.01 m)	232 lb (105 kg)	Sr	Edmond Memorial	Edmond, OK
G	24	Jamal Bieniemy	6 ft 5 in (1.96 m)	187 lb (85 kg)	So	Tompkins	Katy, TX
F	32	Read Streller (W)	6 ft 8 in (2.03 m)	211 lb (96 kg)	So	Oklahoma Christian School	Edmond, OK
F	35	Brady Manek	6 ft 9 in (2.06 m)	231 lb (105 kg)	Jr	Harrah	Harrah, OK
G	44	Blake Seacat (W)	6 ft 4 in (1.93 m)	183 lb (83 kg)	Fr	Jenks	Jenks, OK
G	45	Keller Casey (W)	6 ft 6 in (1.98 m)	212 lb (96 kg)	Fr	Episcopal School of Dallas	Dallas, TX
F	52	Kur Kuath	6 ft 10 in (2.08 m)	220 lb (100 kg)	RS Jr	Salt Lake CC	Biemnon, South Sudan

Head coach

- Lon Kruger (Kansas State)

Assistant coach(es)

- Carlin Hartman (Tulane)
- Jim Molinari (Illinois Wesleyan)
- Pooh Williamson (Tulsa)

Legend

- (C) Team captain
- (S) Suspended
- (I) Ineligible
- (W) Walk-on
- Injured
- Current redshirt

Roster

== Schedule and results ==
Date time, TV	Rank^{#}	Opponent^{#}	Result	Record	Site (attendance) city, state
Exhibition
October 29, 2019*; 6:30 pm, FSOK		Southeastern Oklahoma State	W 89–76		Lloyd Noble Center (6,255); Norman, OK
Regular season
November 5, 2019*; 7:00 pm, SoonerSports.tv		UTSA	W 85–67	1–0	Lloyd Noble Center (7,202); Norman, OK
November 9, 2019*; 7:00 pm, BTN		vs. Minnesota	W 71–62	2–0	Sanford Pentagon (3,445); Sioux Falls, SD
November 12, 2019*; 10:30 pm, ESPN2		vs. Oregon State; Phil Knight Invitational	W 77–69	3–0	Moda Center (7,246); Portland, OR
November 18, 2019*; 6:00 pm, FSOK		William & Mary; CBE Hall of Fame Classic campus-site game	W 75–70	4–0	Lloyd Noble Center (6,393); Norman, OK
November 21, 2019*; 7:00 pm, FSOK		Maryland Eastern Shore; CBE Hall of Fame Classic campus-site game	W 91–64	5–0	Lloyd Noble Center (6,064); Norman, OK
November 25, 2019*; 8:30 pm, ESPN2		vs. Stanford; CBE Hall of Fame Classic semifinals	L 54–73	5–1	Sprint Center (8,963); Kansas City, MO
November 26, 2019*; 6:00 pm, ESPNews		vs. Missouri; CBE Hall of Fame Classic consolation	W 77–66	6–1	Sprint Center (8,506); Kansas City, MO
December 5, 2019*; 7:00 pm, CBSSN Facebook		at North Texas	W 82–80	7–1	UNT Coliseum (5,637); Denton, TX
December 14, 2019*; 5:00 pm, ESPN2		at Wichita State	L 75–80	7–2	Charles Koch Arena (10,727); Wichita, KS
December 17, 2019*; 7:30 pm, FS1		at Creighton; Big East/Big 12 Battle	L 73–83	7–3	CHI Health Center Omaha (17,146); Omaha, NE
December 21, 2019*; 1:00 pm, FSOK		UCF	W 53–52	8–3	Lloyd Noble Center (6,875); Norman, OK
December 30, 2019*; 6:00 pm, FSOK		UTRGV	W 91–72	9–3	Lloyd Noble Center (6,755); Norman, OK
January 4, 2020; 12:00 pm, ESPN+		Kansas State	W 66–61	10–3 (1–0)	Lloyd Noble Center (8,012); Norman, OK
January 8, 2020; 8:00 pm, ESPN2		at Texas	W 72–62	11–3 (2–0)	Frank Erwin Center (8,805); Austin, TX
January 11, 2020; 7:00 pm, ESPN2		at Iowa State	L 68–81	11–4 (2–1)	Hilton Coliseum (14,045); Ames, IA
January 14, 2020; 8:00 pm, ESPN		No. 6 Kansas	L 52–66	11–5 (2–2)	Lloyd Noble Center (10,486); Norman, OK
January 18, 2020; 1:00 pm, ESPN+		TCU	W 83–63	12–5 (3–2)	Lloyd Noble Center (8,699); Norman, OK
January 20, 2020; 8:00 pm, ESPN		at No. 1 Baylor	L 57–61	12–6 (3–3)	Ferrell Center (9,217); Waco, TX
January 25, 2020*; 1:00 pm, ESPN2		vs. Mississippi State; Big 12/SEC Challenge	W 63–62	13–6	Chesapeake Energy Arena (6,442); Oklahoma City, OK
January 29, 2020; 7:00 pm, ESPN+		at Kansas State	L 53–61	13–7 (3–4)	Bramlage Coliseum (8,472); Manhattan, KS
February 1, 2020; 2:00 pm, ABC		Oklahoma State; Bedlam	W 82–69	14–7 (4–4)	Lloyd Noble Center (10,186); Norman, OK
February 4, 2020; 8:00 pm, ESPN2		at Texas Tech	L 61–69	14–8 (4–5)	United Supermarkets Arena (12,224); Lubbock, TX
February 8, 2020; 1:00 pm, ESPNU		No. 13 West Virginia	W 69–59	15–8 (5–5)	Lloyd Noble Center (8,484); Norman, OK
February 12, 2020; 8:00 pm, ESPN2		Iowa State	W 90–61	16–8 (6–5)	Lloyd Noble Center (8,235); Norman, OK
February 15, 2020; 11:00 am, ESPN		at No. 3 Kansas	L 70–87	16–9 (6–6)	Allen Fieldhouse (16,300); Lawrence, KS
February 18, 2020; 8:00 pm, ESPN2		No. 1 Baylor	L 54–65	16–10 (6–7)	Lloyd Noble Center (10,017); Norman, OK
February 22, 2020; 3:00 pm, ESPN2		at Oklahoma State; Bedlam	L 66-83	16–11 (6–8)	Gallagher-Iba Arena (10,252); Stillwater, OK
February 25, 2020; 8:00 pm, ESPN2		vs. No. 22 Texas Tech	W 65–51	17–11 (7–8)	Chesapeake Energy Arena (6,879); Oklahoma City, OK
February 29, 2020; 3:00 pm, ESPN2		at No. 20 West Virginia	W 73–62	18–11 (8–8)	WVU Coliseum (14,044); Morgantown, WV
March 3, 2020; 8:00 pm, ESPN2		Texas	L 51–52	18–12 (8–9)	Lloyd Noble Center (10,110); Norman, OK
March 7, 2020; 5:00 pm, ESPN2		at TCU	W 78–76	19–12 (9–9)	Schollmaier Arena; Fort Worth, TX
Big 12 Tournament
Mar 12, 2020; 8:00 pm, ESPN2	(3)	vs. (6) No. 22 West Virginia; Quarterfinals	Cancelled due to the COVID-19 pandemic		Sprint Center; Kansas City, MO
*Non-conference game. ^{#}Rankings from AP Poll. (#) Tournament seedings in parentheses. All times are in Central Time.

== Rankings ==
Ranking movements Legend: ██ Increase in ranking ██ Decrease in ranking — = Not ranked RV = Received votes
	Week																				
Poll	Pre	1	2	3	4	5	6	7	8	9	10	11	12	13	14	15	16	17	18	19	Final
AP	—	—	RV	RV	RV	—	—	—	—	—	—	—									Not released
Coaches	—	*NR	RV	RV	RV	RV	RV	RV	—	—	—	—									

- No coaches poll for week 1
