= 2019–20 East Carolina Pirates men's basketball team =

American college basketball season

2019–20 East Carolina Pirates men's basketball
- Conference: American Athletic Conference
- Record: 11–20 (5–13 AAC)
- Head coach: Joe Dooley (2nd, 6th overall season)
- Assistant coaches: Steve Roccaforte; Raphael Chillious; George Wright-Easy
- Home arena: Williams Arena (8,000)

2019–20 American Athletic Conference men's basketball standings
	Conf.				Overall
Team	W		L	PCT	W		L	PCT
Cincinnati	13	–	5	.722	20	–	10	.667
No. 22 Houston	13	–	5	.722	23	–	8	.742
Tulsa	13	–	5	.722	21	–	10	.677
Wichita State	11	–	7	.611	23	–	8	.742
UConn	10	–	8	.556	19	–	12	.613
Memphis	10	–	8	.556	21	–	10	.677
SMU	9	–	9	.500	19	–	11	.633
UCF	7	–	11	.389	16	–	14	.533
South Florida	7	–	11	.389	14	–	17	.452
Temple	6	–	12	.333	14	–	17	.452
East Carolina	5	–	13	.278	11	–	20	.355
Tulane	4	–	14	.222	12	–	18	.400
Note: The 2020 AAC tournament was canceled due to the COVID-19 pandemic. Rankings from AP poll

The 2019–20 East Carolina Pirates men's basketball team represented East Carolina University during the 2019–20 NCAA Division I men's basketball season. The Pirates were led by second year head coach, Joe Dooley, who previously coached the Pirates from 1995 to 1999, and played their home games at Williams Arena at Minges Coliseum as sixth-year members of the American Athletic Conference.

== Previous season ==
The Pirates finished the 2018–19 season 10–21, 3–15 in AAC play to finish in 11th place. They lost in the first round of the AAC tournament to Wichita State.

== Offseason ==
=== Departures ===
Name	Number	Pos.	Height	Weight	Year	Hometown	Reason for departure
Isaac Fleming	0	G	6'3"	195	RS Senior	Wilmington, DE	Graduated
K. J. Davis	2	G	6'5"	200	Sophomore	Portsmouth, VA	Transferred to Samford
Tyler Foster	5	G	6'5"	190	Freshman	Baltimore, MD	Transferred to Youngstown State
Tae Hardy	10	G	6'2"	190	Freshman	Ellenwood, GA	Transferred to Pearl River CC
Justin Whatley	13	F	6'8"	240	Sophomore	Chesapeake, VA	Transferred to North Carolina Central
Deshaun Wade	22	G	6'2"	200	Freshman	Virginia Beach, VA	Transferred to Longwood
Rico Quinton	23	F/C	6'9"	240	Freshman	Newbern, TN	Left the team for personal reasons
John Whitley	24	G	6'0"	170	Junior	Washington, D.C.	Walk-on; left the team for personal reasons
Dimitri Spasojevic	32	F	6'8"	240	Sophomore	Vršac, Serbia	Transferred to UMBC
Addison Hill	41	G	6'3"	180	Senior	Winterville, NC	Walk-on; graduated
Justice Obasohan	52	G	6'5"	220	Senior	Wallace, NC	Walk-on; graduated
Shawn Williams	55	G	6'1"	175	RS Sophomore	Maumelle, AR	Transferred to New Mexico State

=== Incoming transfers ===
Name	Number	Pos.	Height	Weight	Year	Hometown	Previous School
Tyrie Jackson	10	G	6'1"	215	RS Junior	Tifton, GA	Northwest Florida State College
J. J. Miles	11	G	6'7"	220	Junior	Garysburg, NC	Cape Fear CC
Tremont Robinson	12	G	6'2"	190	RS Sophomore	Little Rock, AR	Garden City CC
Bitumba Baruti	20	G	6'6"	225	Junior	Lubumbashi, DR Congo	Chipola College
Ludgy Debaut	21	C	6'10"	245	Junior	Les Abymes, Guadeloupe	Northwest Florida State College
Miles James	33	G/F	6'6"	215	Sophomore	Inglewood, CA	Palm Beach State College
Edra Luster	44	C	6'11"	230	Junior	Oakland, CA	Tyler JC

=== Recruiting class of 2019 ===
College recruiting information
Name	Hometown	School	Height	Weight	Commit date
Charles Coleman Jr. C	Boston, MA	Dexter School	7 ft 0 in (2.13 m)	255 lb (116 kg)	May 27, 2019
Charles Coleman Jr. C	Recruit ratings: Scout: Rivals: 247Sports: (79)				
Logan Curtis; SG	Baltimore, MD	Calvert High School	6 ft 3 in (1.91 m)	195 lb (88 kg)	Jun 23, 2018
Logan Curtis; SG	Recruit ratings: Scout: Rivals: 247Sports: (NR)				
Tristen Newton; PG	El Paso, TX	Burges High School	6 ft 5 in (1.96 m)	185 lb (84 kg)	Apr 26, 2019
Tristen Newton; PG	Recruit ratings: Scout: Rivals: 247Sports: (NR)				
Brandon Suggs; SF	Austell, GA	Massanutten Military Academy	6 ft 6 in (1.98 m)	200 lb (91 kg)	Jan 17, 2019
Brandon Suggs; SF	Recruit ratings: Scout: Rivals: 247Sports: (NR)				
Overall recruit ranking:
Note: In many cases, Scout, Rivals, 247Sports, On3, and ESPN may conflict in their listings of height and weight.; In these cases, the average was taken. ESPN grades are on a 100-point scale.; Sources: "2019 Team Ranking". Rivals.

=== Recruiting class of 2020 ===
College recruiting information (2020)
Name	Hometown	School	Height	Weight	Commit date
Derrick Quansah; C	Fayetteville, NC	Massanutten Military Academy	7 ft 0 in (2.13 m)	N/A	May 3, 2019
Derrick Quansah; C	Recruit ratings: Scout: Rivals: 247Sports: (NR)				
Noah Farrakhan; PG	Newark, NJ	The Patrick School (NJ)	6 ft 1 in (1.85 m)	160 lb (73 kg)	Apr 21, 2020
Noah Farrakhan; PG	Recruit ratings: Rivals: 247Sports: ESPN: (80)				
Overall recruit ranking:
Note: In many cases, Scout, Rivals, 247Sports, On3, and ESPN may conflict in their listings of height and weight.; In these cases, the average was taken. ESPN grades are on a 100-point scale.; Sources: "2020 East Carolina Signees". Rivals.; "2020 East Carolina Signees". ESPN.; "2020 Team Ranking". Rivals.

== Roster ==
2019–20 East Carolina Pirates men's basketball team
Players
Coaches

Pos.	#	Name	Height	Weight	Year	Previous school	Hometown
F	1	Jayden Gardner	6 ft 7 in (2.01 m)	235 lb (107 kg)	So	Heritage	Wake Forest, NC
G	2	Tristen Newton	6 ft 5 in (1.96 m)	185 lb (84 kg)	Fr	Burges	El Paso, TX
F	3	Seth LeDay (LT)	6 ft 7 in (2.01 m)	215 lb (98 kg)	RS Sr	Virginia Tech	The Colony, TX
G/F	4	Brandon Suggs	6 ft 6 in (1.98 m)	200 lb (91 kg)	Fr	Massanutten Military Academy	Powder Springs, GA
G	5	Logan Curtis	6 ft 3 in (1.91 m)	195 lb (88 kg)	Fr	Calvert Hall College	Baltimore, MD
G	10	Tyrie Jackson	6 ft 2 in (1.88 m)	215 lb (98 kg)	RS Jr	NW Florida State College	Tifton, GA
G	11	J. J. Miles	6 ft 7 in (2.01 m)	220 lb (100 kg)	Jr	Cape Fear CC	Garysburg, NC
G	12	Tremont Robinson-White	6 ft 1 in (1.85 m)	190 lb (86 kg)	So	Garden City CC	Little Rock, AR
G	13	Ian Jones (W)	6 ft 3 in (1.91 m)	195 lb (88 kg)	Jr	Harnett Central	Lillington, NC
G	20	Bitumba Baruti	6 ft 7 in (2.01 m)	225 lb (102 kg)	RS Jr	Chipola College	Lubumbashi, DR Congo
C	21	Ludgy Debaut	7 ft 0 in (2.13 m)	245 lb (111 kg)	Jr	NW Florida State College	Les Abymes, Guadeloupe
G	24	Evan Umstead (W)	6 ft 0 in (1.83 m)	195 lb (88 kg)	Jr	Northside Christian Academy	Cary, NC
F	25	Samson Strickland (W)	6 ft 5 in (1.96 m)	220 lb (100 kg)	So	Washington Academy	Wilson, NC
F/C	32	Charles Coleman	7 ft 0 in (2.13 m)	255 lb (116 kg)	Fr	Dexter Southfield	Boston, MA
G	33	Miles James	6 ft 6 in (1.98 m)	215 lb (98 kg)	So	Palm Beach State College	Inglewood, CA
F/C	44	Edra Luster	7 ft 0 in (2.13 m)	230 lb (104 kg)	Jr	Tyler JC	Oakland, CA

Head coach

- Joe Dooley (George Washington)

Assistant coach(es)

- Steve Roccaforte (Lamar)
- Raphael Chillious (Lafayette)
- George Wright-Easy (Saint Francis (PA))

Legend

- (C) Team captain
- (S) Suspended
- (I) Ineligible
- (W) Walk-on
- (LT) Left team
- Injured
- Current redshirt

Roster

- Dec. 17, 2019 - Seth LeDay left the team after the Maryland Eastern Shore game.

== Schedule and results ==
Date time, TV	Rank^{#}	Opponent^{#}	Result	Record	Site (attendance) city, state
Non-conference regular season
November 5, 2019*; 7:00 pm, ESPN3		VMI	W 80–68	1–0	Williams Arena (4,027); Greenville, NC
November 8, 2019*; 8:30 pm, CBSSN		at Navy; Veterans Classic	L 57–62	1–1	Alumni Hall (4,549); Annapolis, MD
November 12, 2019*; 7:00 pm, ESPN+		at Appalachian State	L 62–68	1–2	Holmes Center (1,893); Boone, NC
November 16, 2019*; 4:00 pm, ESPN3		Liberty; The Islands of the Bahamas Showcase on campus game	L 57–77	1–3	Williams Arena (4,527); Greenville, NC
November 22, 2019*; 8:00 pm, FloSports		vs. Evansville; The Islands of the Bahamas Showcase Quarterfinals	W 85–68	2–3	Kendal Isaacs National Gymnasium (300); Nassau, Bahamas
November 23, 2019*; 8:00 pm, FloSports		vs. UMKC; The Islands of the Bahamas Showcase Semifinals	L 68–74	2–4	Kendal Isaacs National Gymnasium (300); Nassau, Bahamas
November 24, 2019*; 5:00 pm, FloSports		vs. Rice; The Islands of the Bahamas Showcase 3rd Place Game	L 69–77	2–5	Kendal Isaacs National Gymnasium (300); Nassau, Bahamas
November 30, 2019*; 4:00 pm, FloSports		at James Madison	L 89–99	2–6	JMU Convocation Center (2,068); Harrisonburg, VA
December 3, 2019*; 7:00 pm, ESPN3		Coppin State	L 75–85	2–7	Williams Arena (3,208); Greenville, NC
December 14, 2019*; 4:00 pm, ESPN3		Campbell	W 79–67	3–7	Williams Arena (3,234); Greenville, NC
December 17, 2019*; 7:00 pm		Maryland Eastern Shore	W 71–57	4–7	Williams Arena (2,584); Greenville, NC
December 22, 2019*; 4:00 pm, ESPN3		Charlotte	W 60–56	5–7	Williams Arena (3,626); Greenville, NC
December 28, 2019*; 4:00 pm, ESPN3		Eastern Kentucky	W 82–74	6–7	Williams Arena (3,481); Greenville, NC
AAC regular season
January 1, 2020; 3:00 pm, ESPNU		at No. 24 Wichita State	L 69–75	6–8 (0–1)	Charles Koch Arena (10,506); Wichita, KS
January 7, 2020; 7:00 pm, ESPN3		South Florida	W 62–59	7–8 (1–1)	Williams Arena (3,389); Greenville, NC
January 11, 2020; 2:00 pm, ESPNU		SMU	W 71–68	8–8 (2–1)	Williams Arena (4,014); Greenville, NC
January 15, 2020; 7:00 pm, ESPN3		Tulsa	L 49–65	8–9 (2–2)	Williams Arena (5,332); Greenville, NC
January 19, 2020; 6:00 pm, ESPNU		at Cincinnati	L 57–82	8–10 (2–3)	Fifth Third Arena (11,103); Cincinnati, OH
January 22, 2020; 8:00 pm, ESPN3		at SMU	L 64–84	8–11 (2–4)	Moody Coliseum (3,878); Dallas, TX
January 25, 2020; 6:00 pm, ESPNU		Tulane	W 81–62	9–11 (3–4)	Williams Arena (4,817); Greenville, NC
January 29, 2020; 7:00 pm, ESPN3		No. 21 Houston	L 59–69	9–12 (3–5)	Williams Arena (4,406); Greenville, NC
February 1, 2020; 6:00 pm, CBSSN		at Temple	L 64–76	9–13 (3–6)	Liacouras Center (6,877); Philadelphia, PA
February 6, 2020; 7:00 pm, ESPNU		UCF	L 64–68	9–14 (3–7)	Williams Arena (3,474); Greenville, NC
February 8, 2020; 6:00 pm, ESPNU		at Tulane	W 81–67	10–14 (4–7)	Devlin Fieldhouse (1,742); New Orleans, LA
February 12, 2020; 8:00 pm, ESPN3		at Tulsa	L 56–70	10–15 (4–8)	Reynolds Center (3,232); Tulsa, OK
February 16, 2020; 12:00 pm, CBSSN		Cincinnati	L 67–70 ^{OT}	10–16 (4–9)	Williams Arena (4,082); Greenville, NC
February 19, 2020; 7:00 pm, CBSSN		at Memphis	L 73–77	10–17 (4–10)	FedExForum (16,038); Memphis, TN
February 23, 2020; 12:00 pm, ESPNU		Temple	W 67–63	11–17 (5–10)	Williams Arena (3,695); Greenville, NC
February 26, 2020; 7:00 pm, ESPN3		at South Florida	L 68–73 ^{OT}	11–18 (5–11)	Yuengling Center (2,692); Tampa, FL
February 29, 2020; 2:00 pm, ESPNU		Connecticut	L 63–84	11–19 (5–12)	Williams Arena (5,003); Greenville, NC
March 8, 2020; 2:00 pm, ESPNU		at UCF	L 62–94	11–20 (5–13)	Addition Financial Arena (4,819); Orlando, FL
AAC tournament
March 12, 2020; 10:00 pm, ESPNU	(11)	vs. (6) Memphis; First Round	Cancelled		Dickies Arena; Fort Worth, TX
*Non-conference game. ^{#}Rankings from AP Poll. (#) Tournament seedings in parentheses. All times are in Eastern Time.

1. Cancelled due to the Coronavirus Pandemic

== Awards and honors ==
=== American Athletic Conference honors ===
==== All-AAC Second Team ====
- Jayden Gardner

==== Player of the Week ====
- Week 7: Jayden Gardner
- Week 10: Jayden Gardner
