= Brandon Rachal =

American basketball player (born 1999)

Free agent
- Position: Shooting guard

Personal information
- Born: September 30, 1999 (age 27) Natchitoches, Louisiana, U.S.
- Listed height: 6 ft 6 in (1.98 m)
- Listed weight: 215 lb (98 kg)

Career information
- High school: Natchitoches Central (Natchitoches, Louisiana)
- College: LSU (2017–2018); Pearl River CC (2018–2019); Tulsa (2019–2021)
- NBA draft: 2021: undrafted
- Playing career: 2021–present

Career history
- 2021–2023: Long Island Nets
- 2024: Austin Spurs

Career highlights
- Second-team All-AAC (2021); Third-team All-AAC (2020)
- Stats at Basketball Reference

Brandon Tyree Rachal (born September 30, 1999) is an American professional basketball player who last played for the Austin Spurs of the NBA G League. He played college basketball for the LSU Tigers, the Pearl River CC Wildcats, and the Tulsa Golden Hurricane.

== High school career ==
Rachal played basketball for Natchitoches Central High School in his hometown of Natchitoches, Louisiana. He helped his team win two state titles with one runner-up finish. In his junior season, Rachal averaged 15 points, eight rebounds and three steals per game. He led his team to a Class 5A state championship and was named MVP of the title game. As a senior, he averaged 20 points, 12 rebounds and three steals per game. A four-star recruit, Rachal committed to playing college basketball for LSU over offers from Texas and Texas A&M, among others. He reaffirmed his commitment to LSU after head coach Johnny Jones was replaced by Will Wade. Rachal also played football at the wide receiver position in high school and was recruited by college football programs.

== College career ==
On January 29, 2018, Rachal was suspended for one game by LSU for violating team rules. He was suspended for LSU's two games at the National Invitational Tournament for undisclosed reasons. As a freshman, Rachal averaged 4.4 points and 3.3 rebounds per game. For his sophomore season, he moved to Pearl River Community College. Rachal averaged 15.5 points, 8.7 rebounds and 2.7 assists per game, earning Second Team National Junior College Athletic Association All-American honors. For his junior season, he transferred to Tulsa. On November 16, 2019, he recorded a career-high 30 points, seven rebounds and five steals in a 72–65 victory against Austin Peay. As a junior, Rachal averaged 12.1 points and 5.8 rebounds per game, and was named to the Third Team All-American Athletic Conference (AAC). On January 2, 2021, he posted a senior season-high 25 points and 13 rebounds in a 70–66 win over Cincinnati. Rachal was named Naismith Player of the Week on January 4. As a senior, he averaged 15 points, 7.2 rebounds and 2.2 assists per game, and was a Second Team All-AAC selection.

== Professional career ==
=== Long Island Nets (2021–2023) ===
After going undrafted in the 2021 NBA draft, Rachal joined the Brooklyn Nets for 2021 NBA Summer League. On October 11, 2021, Rachal signed with the Nets. He was waived at the end of training camp on October 15. On October 25, 2021, Rachal joined the Long Island Nets.

Rachal again signed with the Brooklyn Nets on October 1, 2022, but was waived on October 5. He rejoined Long Island on October 9. On January 23, 2023, Rachal was waived after appearing in 1 game. He was acquired by the Fort Wayne Mad Ants from waivers, on February 27. He was waived on March 8 without appearing in a game.

On October 30, 2023, Rachal joined the Rip City Remix of the NBA G League, but was waived on November 7.

=== Austin Spurs (2024) ===
On March 4, 2024, Rachal joined the Austin Spurs.

== Career statistics ==
Legend
GP	Games played	GS	Games started	MPG	Minutes per game
FG%	Field goal percentage	3P%	3-point field goal percentage	FT%	Free throw percentage
RPG	Rebounds per game	APG	Assists per game	SPG	Steals per game
BPG	Blocks per game	PPG	Points per game	**Bold**	Career high

=== College ===
==== NCAA Division I ====
Year	Team	GP	GS	MPG	FG%	3P%	FT%	RPG	APG	SPG	BPG	PPG
2017–18	LSU	27	0	15.9	**.533**	.200	.550	3.3	.7	1.0	.2	4.4
2019–20	Tulsa	**30**	**29**	29.1	.441	.246	**.794**	5.8	1.4	1.5	.6	12.1
2020–21	Tulsa	23	23	**31.6**	.442	**.314**	.726	**7.2**	**2.2**	**1.6**	**.8**	**15.0**
Career		80	52	25.4	.454	.285	.732	5.4	1.4	1.3	.5	10.4

==== JUCO ====
Year	Team	GP	GS	MPG	FG%	3P%	FT%	RPG	APG	SPG	BPG	PPG
2018–19	Pearl River CC	30	28	–	.497	.292	.641	8.7	2.7	1.7	.8	15.5
