= 2019–20 Tulane Green Wave men's basketball team =

American college basketball season

2019–20 Tulane Green Wave men's basketball
- Conference: American Athletic Conference
- Record: 12–18 (4–14 AAC)
- Head coach: Ron Hunter (1st season)
- Assistant coaches: Ray McCallum; Claude Pardue; Kevin Johnson
- Home arena: Devlin Fieldhouse

2019–20 American Athletic Conference men's basketball standings
	Conf.				Overall
Team	W		L	PCT	W		L	PCT
Cincinnati	13	–	5	.722	20	–	10	.667
No. 22 Houston	13	–	5	.722	23	–	8	.742
Tulsa	13	–	5	.722	21	–	10	.677
Wichita State	11	–	7	.611	23	–	8	.742
UConn	10	–	8	.556	19	–	12	.613
Memphis	10	–	8	.556	21	–	10	.677
SMU	9	–	9	.500	19	–	11	.633
UCF	7	–	11	.389	16	–	14	.533
South Florida	7	–	11	.389	14	–	17	.452
Temple	6	–	12	.333	14	–	17	.452
East Carolina	5	–	13	.278	11	–	20	.355
Tulane	4	–	14	.222	12	–	18	.400
Note: The 2020 AAC tournament was canceled due to the COVID-19 pandemic. Rankings from AP poll

The 2019–20 Tulane Green Wave men's basketball team represented Tulane University during the 2019–20 NCAA Division I men's basketball season. The Green Wave, led by first-year head coach Ron Hunter, played their home games at Devlin Fieldhouse in New Orleans, Louisiana as sixth-year members of the American Athletic Conference.

== Previous season ==
The Green Wave 4–27, 0–18 in AAC play to finish in 12th place. They lost in the first round of the AAC tournament to Memphis.

On March 16, 2019, the school announced that Mike Dunleavy would not return as head coach. He finished 24–69 in three seasons at Tulane. On March 24, the school named Georgia State head coach Ron Hunter the new head coach.

== Offseason ==
=== Departures ===
Name	Number	Pos.	Height	Weight	Year	Hometown	Reason for departure
Jordan Cornish	0	G	6'6"	225	RS Senior	New Orleans, LA	Graduated
Moses Wood	4	F	6'8"	190	Freshman	Reno, NV	Transferred to UNLV
Connor Crabtree	5	G	6'6"	190	Freshman	Hillsborough, NC	Transferred to Richmond
Caleb Daniels	10	G	6'4"	205	Sophomore	New Orleans, LA	Transferred to Villanova
Bul Ajang	11	F	6'10"	225	Sophomore	Jonglei, South Sudan	Medically retired
Semir Sehic	21	F	6'9"	235	RS Junior	Cypress, TX	Play professionally
Blake Paul	23	F	6'9"	250	Senior	New Orleans, LA	Graduated
Shakwon Barett	24	G	6'5"	180	RS Freshman	Toronto, ON	Transferred to Northwest Florida State College

=== Incoming transfers ===
Name	Number	Pos.	Height	Weight	Year	Hometown	Previous School
K. J. Lawson	1	F	6'8"	210	Graduate Student	Memphis, TN	Transferred from Kansas after graduating. Will have one year of eligibility beginning immediately.
TeShaun Hightower	5	G	6'4"	190	Junior	Lithonia, GA	Transferred from Georgia. Hightower was granted a waiver for immediate eligibility. Will have two years of remaining eligibility.
Ibrahim Ali	11	G	6'10"	245	RS Freshman	Lagos, Nigeria	Transferred from Arkansas. Ali was granted a waiver for immediate eligibility. Will have four years of remaining eligibility.
Nic Thomas	14	G	6'2'	185	Graduate Student	Arlington, TX	Transferred from Norfolk State after graduating. Will have one year of eligibility beginning immediately.
Christion Thompson	25	G	6'4'	190	Graduate Student	Baton Rouge, LA	Transferred from Rhode Island after graduating. Will have one year of eligibility beginning immediately.

=== 2019 recruiting class ===
College recruiting information
Name	Hometown	School	Height	Weight	Commit date
Nobal Days; PF	Racine, WI	Washington Park High School	6 ft 9 in (2.06 m)	200 lb (91 kg)	Nov 15, 2018
Nobal Days; PF	Recruit ratings: Scout: Rivals: 247Sports: (80)				
Tylan Pope; PF	Franklinton, LA	Franklinton High School	6 ft 6 in (1.98 m)	220 lb (100 kg)	May 28, 2019
Tylan Pope; PF	Recruit ratings: Scout: Rivals: 247Sports: (NR)				
Charlie Russell; SF	New Orleans, LA	Sophie B. Wright High School	6 ft 6 in (1.98 m)	175 lb (79 kg)	May 2, 2019
Charlie Russell; SF	Recruit ratings: Scout: Rivals: 247Sports: (NR)				
R.J. McGee; SF	Chicago, IL	Taylormade Academy	6 ft 5 in (1.96 m)	205 lb (93 kg)	Apr 17, 2019
R.J. McGee; SF	Recruit ratings: Scout: Rivals: 247Sports: (NR)				
Overall recruit ranking:
Note: In many cases, Scout, Rivals, 247Sports, On3, and ESPN may conflict in their listings of height and weight.; In these cases, the average was taken. ESPN grades are on a 100-point scale.; Sources: "2019 Team Ranking". Rivals.

=== 2020 recruiting class ===
College recruiting information (2020)
Name	Hometown	School	Height	Weight	Commit date
Jadan Coleman; SG	Madison, AL	Bob Jones High School	6 ft 4 in (1.93 m)	155 lb (70 kg)	Nov 15, 2018
Jadan Coleman; SG	Recruit ratings: Scout: Rivals: 247Sports: (NR)				
Sion James; PG	Buford, GA	Lanier High School	6 ft 4 in (1.93 m)	185 lb (84 kg)	Sep 1, 2019
Sion James; PG	Recruit ratings: Scout: Rivals: 247Sports: (NR)				
Overall recruit ranking: 247Sports: 131
Note: In many cases, Scout, Rivals, 247Sports, On3, and ESPN may conflict in their listings of height and weight.; In these cases, the average was taken. ESPN grades are on a 100-point scale.; Sources: "2020 Team Ranking". Rivals.

== Roster ==
2019–20 Tulane Green Wave men's basketball team
Players
Coaches

Pos.	#	Name	Height	Weight	Year	Previous school	Hometown
G/F	0	Charlie Russell Jr.	6 ft 7 in (2.01 m)	190 lb (86 kg)	Fr	Sophie B. Wright	New Orleans, LA
G/F	1	K. J. Lawson	6 ft 7 in (2.01 m)	215 lb (98 kg)	GS	Hamilton; Kansas	Memphis, TN
G	2	Jordan Walker	5 ft 11 in (1.8 m)	170 lb (77 kg)	RS So	The Patrick School; Seton Hall	Port Washington, NY
G	3	Ray Ona Embo (LT)	6 ft 5 in (1.96 m)	195 lb (88 kg)	RS Jr	Quality Education Academy	Lognes, France
F	4	Nobal Days	6 ft 9 in (2.06 m)	220 lb (100 kg)	Fr	Racine Park	Racine, WI
G	5	TeShaun Hightower	6 ft 5 in (1.96 m)	190 lb (86 kg)	Jr	Mount Zion Prep; Georgia	Lithonia, GA
F	10	Tylan Pope (redshirt)	6 ft 6 in (1.98 m)	220 lb (100 kg)	Fr	Franklinton	Franklinton, LA
F	11	Ibrahim Ali	6 ft 10 in (2.08 m)	245 lb (111 kg)	RS Fr	Maumelle; Arkansas	Lagos, Nigeria
F	12	Kevin Zhang	6 ft 10 in (2.08 m)	220 lb (100 kg)	So	Montverde Academy	Shenyang, China
C	13	Buay Koka	7 ft 1 in (2.16 m)	210 lb (95 kg)	RS So	The Patrick School	Nasir, South Sudan
G	14	Nic Thomas	6 ft 1 in (1.85 m)	185 lb (84 kg)	GS	Home School Athletic Association; Norfolk State	Arlington, TX
G	15	Grant Quinn (W)	6 ft 5 in (1.96 m)	200 lb (91 kg)	RS Jr	Liberty Christian; Oklahoma	Lewisville, TX
G	23	R. J. McGee	6 ft 10 in (2.08 m)	200 lb (91 kg)	Fr	TaylorMade Academy	Chicago, IL
G	25	Christion Thompson	6 ft 4 in (1.93 m)	215 lb (98 kg)	GS	Madison Prep; Rhode Island	Gonzales, LA
G	32	Cameron Galic (W)	6 ft 6 in (1.98 m)	205 lb (93 kg)	Jr	Bethesda-Chevy Chase	Bethesda, MD
G	34	Alec Zaccardo (W)	6 ft 0 in (1.83 m)	160 lb (73 kg)	So	Lincoln-Sudbury Regional; MassBay CC	Boston, MA

Head coach

- Ron Hunter (Miami (OH))

Assistant coach(es)

- Ray McCallum (Ball State)
- Claude Pardue (Emory)
- Kevin Johnson (Texas–Pan American)

Legend

- (C) Team captain
- (S) Suspended
- (I) Ineligible
- (W) Walk-on
- (LT) Left team
- Injured
- Current redshirt

Roster

- Dec. 1, 2019 - Ray Ona Embo quit the team. He elected to return home to France to pursue a professional career.

== Schedule and results ==
Date time, TV	Rank^{#}	Opponent^{#}	Result	Record	High points	High rebounds	High assists	Site (attendance) city, state
Exhibition
October 31, 2019*; 7:00 pm		Spring Hill	W 93–55		23 – Thompson	8 – Tied	7 – Walker	Devlin Fieldhouse (862); New Orleans, LA
Non-conference regular season
November 6, 2019*; 7:00 pm, ESPN3		Southeastern Louisiana	W 76–55	1–0	24 – Walker	14 – Thompson	6 – Lawson	Devlin Fieldhouse (2,179); New Orleans, LA
November 12, 2019*; 7:00 pm		Jackson State	W 88–79	2–0	21 – Hightower	8 – Thompson	4 – Lawson	Devlin Fieldhouse (1,225); New Orleans, LA
November 16, 2019*; 1:00 pm, ESPN3		Northwestern State	W 79–52	3–0	19 – Hightower	6 – Walker	4 – Tied	Devlin Fieldhouse (919); New Orleans, LA
November 21, 2019*; 1:00 pm, ESPNU		vs. Mississippi State; Myrtle Beach Invitational quarterfinal	L 66–80	3–1	12 – Tied	3 – Tied	6 – Walker	HTC Center; Conway, SC
November 22, 2019*; 11:00 am, ESPNU		vs. Middle Tennessee; Myrtle Beach Invitational consolation 2nd round	W 86–74	4–1	25 – Thompson	6 – 4 tied	5 – Walker	HTC Center; Conway, SC
November 24, 2019*; 9:30 am, ESPNU		vs. Utah; Myrtle Beach Invitational 5th place game	W 65–61	5–1	16 – Hightower	5 – Thompson	7 – Walker	HTC Center; Conway, SC
December 1, 2019*; 1:00 pm, ESPN3		Southern	W 82–65	6–1	30 – Lawson	9 – Thompson	5 – Hightower	Devlin Fieldhouse (1,745); New Orleans, LA
December 4, 2019*; 7:00 pm		at Southern Miss	W 61–56	7–1	15 – Thompson	10 – Hightower	4 – Lawson	Reed Green Coliseum (3,668); Hattiesburg, MS
December 8, 2019*; 12:30 pm, ESPN+		vs. Saint Louis; Jerry Colangelo Classic	L 62–86	7–2	18 – Lawson	8 – Lawson	4 – Thompson	Talking Stick Resort Arena (1,050); Phoenix, AZ
December 16, 2019*; 7:00 pm, ESPN3		Alcorn State	W 68–57	8–2	15 – Hightower	8 – Days	4 – Tied	Devlin Fieldhouse (883); New Orleans, LA
December 20, 2019*; 1:30 pm		vs. Akron; DC Holiday Hoops Fest semifinals	L 61–62	8–3	18 – Hightower	9 – Tied	2 – Tied	Entertainment and Sports Arena; Washington, D.C.
December 21, 2019*; 12:00 pm		vs. Towson; DC Holiday Hoops Fest 3rd place game	L 82–86 ^{OT}	8–4	33 – Hightower	7 – Lawson	5 – Thompson	Entertainment and Sports Arena; Washington, D.C.
AAC regular season
December 30, 2019; 8:00 pm, CBSSN		at No. 9 Memphis	L 73–84	8–5 (0–1)	22 – Lawson	7 – Hightower	4 – Thompson	FedExForum (15,544); Memphis, TN
January 4, 2020; 3:00 pm, CBSSN		Cincinnati	W 76–71	9–5 (1–1)	22 – Hightower	9 – Thompson	3 – Lawson	Devlin Fieldhouse (2,513); New Orleans, LA
January 8, 2020; 9:00 pm, CBSSN		at UConn	L 61–67	9–6 (1–2)	17 – Hightower	10 – Thompson	4 – Thompson	Harry A. Gampel Pavilion (5,721); Storrs, CT
January 11, 2020; 11:00 am, ESPNU		at Temple	W 65–51	10–6 (2–2)	17 – Tied	10 – Lawson	6 – Tied	Liacouras Center (6,485); Philadelphia, PA
January 14, 2020; 7:00 pm, ESPN3		UCF	L 55–74	10–7 (2–3)	19 – Thompson	7 – Days	3 – Walker	Devlin Fieldhouse (1,665); New Orleans, LA
January 18, 2020; 1:00 pm, ESPN3		Tulsa	L 54–67	10–8 (2–4)	15 – Lawson	6 – Lawson	5 – Thompson	Devlin Fieldhouse (2,189); New Orleans, LA
January 25, 2020; 1:00 pm, ESPNU		at East Carolina	L 62–81	10–9 (2–5)	19 – Thomas	13 – Thompson	4 – Lawson	Williams Arena (4,817); Greenville, NC
January 29, 2020; 7:00 pm, ESPN3		South Florida	L 52–66	10–10 (2–6)	18 – Thompson	3 – 3 tied	3 – Thompson	Devlin Fieldhouse (1,945); New Orleans, LA
February 1, 2020; 7:00 pm, ESPNU		at SMU	L 67–82	10–11 (2–7)	20 – Thomas	7 – Lawson	4 – Hightower	Moody Coliseum (4,477); Dallas, TX
February 6, 2020; 8:00 pm, ESPNU		at No. 25 Houston	L 62–75	10–12 (2–8)	17 – Hightower	5 – Tied	3 – Thompson	Fertitta Center (6,430); Houston, TX
February 8, 2020; 5:00 pm, ESPNU		East Carolina	L 67–81	10–13 (2–9)	23 – Thompson	9 – Thompson	6 – Thompson	Devlin Fieldhouse (1,742); New Orleans, LA
February 12, 2020; 7:00 pm, ESPN3		Temple	L 68–72	10–14 (2–10)	23 – Hightower	9 – Lawson	4 – Thompson	Devlin Fieldhouse (1,330); New Orleans, LA
February 16, 2020; 1:00 pm, CBSSN		at Wichita State	L 57–82	10–15 (2–11)	16 – Thompson	7 – Thompson	4 – Hightower	Charles Koch Arena (10,506); Wichita, KS
February 19, 2020; 7:00 pm, ESPN3		SMU	W 80–72	11–15 (3–11)	26 – Hightower	9 – Hightower	6 – Walker	Devlin Fieldhouse (1,150); New Orleans, LA
February 22, 2020; 11:00 am, ESPNU		at UCF	W 75–74	12–15 (4–11)	21 – Lawson	9 – Thompson	5 – Hightower	Addition Financial Arena (4,966); Orlando, FL
February 25, 2020; 8:00 pm, ESPNU		at Tulsa	L 57–62	12–16 (4–12)	19 – Hightower	6 – Tied	3 – 3 tied	Reynolds Center (3,443); Tulsa, OK
February 29, 2020; 7:00 pm, CBSSN		Memphis	L 67–74 ^{OT}	12–17 (4–13)	30 – Thompson	9 – Lawson	3 – Thompson	Devlin Fieldhouse (3,023); New Orleans, LA
March 8, 2020; 3:00 pm, ESPNU		UConn	L 76–80	12–18 (4–14)	21 – Thompson	5 – Lawson	3 – Lawson	Devlin Fieldhouse (1,897); New Orleans, LA
AAC tournament
March 12, 2020; 2:00 pm, ESPNU	(12)	vs. (5) UConn; First Round	Cancelled					Dickies Arena; Fort Worth, TX
*Non-conference game. ^{#}Rankings from AP Poll. (#) Tournament seedings in parentheses. All times are in Central Time.

1. Cancelled due to the Coronavirus Pandemic

== Awards and honors ==
=== American Athletic Conference honors ===
==== Player of the Week ====
- Week 16: Teshaun Hightower
