= 2019–20 UConn Huskies men's basketball team =

American college basketball season

2019–20 UConn Huskies men's basketball
- Conference: American Athletic Conference
- Record: 19–12 (10–8 AAC)
- Head coach: Dan Hurley (2nd season)
- Assistant coaches: Tom Moore; Kimani Young; Kenya Hunter (on leave); Taliek Brown (interim)
- Home arena: Harry A. Gampel Pavilion; XL Center

2019–20 American Athletic Conference men's basketball standings
	Conf.				Overall
Team	W		L	PCT	W		L	PCT
Cincinnati	13	–	5	.722	20	–	10	.667
No. 22 Houston	13	–	5	.722	23	–	8	.742
Tulsa	13	–	5	.722	21	–	10	.677
Wichita State	11	–	7	.611	23	–	8	.742
UConn	10	–	8	.556	19	–	12	.613
Memphis	10	–	8	.556	21	–	10	.677
SMU	9	–	9	.500	19	–	11	.633
UCF	7	–	11	.389	16	–	14	.533
South Florida	7	–	11	.389	14	–	17	.452
Temple	6	–	12	.333	14	–	17	.452
East Carolina	5	–	13	.278	11	–	20	.355
Tulane	4	–	14	.222	12	–	18	.400
Note: The 2020 AAC tournament was canceled due to the COVID-19 pandemic. Rankings from AP poll

The 2019–20 UConn Huskies men's basketball team represented the University of Connecticut in the 2019–20 NCAA Division I men's basketball season. The Huskies were led by second-year head coach Dan Hurley in their final season of the American Athletic Conference. The Huskies split their home games between the XL Center in Hartford, Connecticut, and the Harry A. Gampel Pavilion on the UConn campus in Storrs, Connecticut. They finished the season 19–12, 10–8 in AAC play to finish in a tie for fifth place. Their season ended when the AAC Tournament and all other postseason tournaments were canceled due to the COVID-19 pandemic.

This was the final season in the American Athletic Conference for the Huskies, as they returned to the Big East for the 2020–21 season.

== Previous season ==
The Huskies finished the 2018–19 season 16–17, 6–12 in AAC play to finish in ninth place. They lost in the Quarterfinals of the AAC tournament to Houston.

== Offseason ==
=== Departures ===
Name	Number	Pos.	Height	Weight	Year	Hometown	Notes
Eric Cobb	0	F	6'9"	249lbs	Senior	Jacksonville, FL	Graduated
Tarin Smith	2	G	6'2"	185lbs	Graduate Student	Ocean Township, NJ	Graduated
Jalen Adams	4	G	6'3"	195lbs	Senior	Roxbury, MA	Graduated
Kassoum Yakwe	14	F	6'7"	212lbs	Graduate Student	Bamako, Mali	Graduated
Mamadou Diarra	21	F	6'8"	225lbs	RS Sophomore	Queens, NY	Left the team, became a student assistant
Kwintin Williams	22	F	6'7"	221lbs	Junior	Anchorage, AK	Graduated (early)
Daniel Brocke	55	F	6'7"	235lbs	Sophomore	West Hartford, CT	Left the team

=== Incoming transfers ===
Name	Number	Pos.	Height	Weight	Year	Hometown	Notes
R. J. Cole	4	G	6'1"	185	Junior	Union, NJ	Transfer from Howard. Under NCAA transfer rules, Cole will have to sit out for the 2019–20 season. Will have two years of remaining eligibility.

=== 2019 recruiting class ===
College recruiting
Name	Hometown	School	Height	Weight	Commit date
James Bouknight; SG	Brooklyn, NY	MacDuffie School	6 ft 4 in (1.93 m)	180 lb (82 kg)	Sep 18, 2018
James Bouknight; SG	Recruit ratings: Rivals: 247Sports: ESPN: (86)				
Jalen Gaffney; PG	West Chester, PA	Westtown School	6 ft 2 in (1.88 m)	170 lb (77 kg)	Sep 24, 2018
Jalen Gaffney; PG	Recruit ratings: Rivals: 247Sports: ESPN: (83)				
Overall recruit ranking: Rivals: 44 247Sports: 18 ESPN: 19
Note: In many cases, Scout, Rivals, 247Sports, On3, and ESPN may conflict in their listings of height and weight.; In these cases, the average was taken. ESPN grades are on a 100-point scale.; Sources: "2019 UConn Basketball Commitments". Rivals.; "2019 UConn Huskies Recruiting Class". ESPN.; "2019 Team Ranking". Rivals.

== Roster ==
2019–20 UConn Huskies men's basketball team
Players
Coaches

Pos.	#	Name	Height	Weight	Year	Previous school	Hometown
G	0	Jalen Gaffney	6 ft 2 in (1.88 m)	175 lb (79 kg)	Fr	Westtown School	Columbus, NJ
G	1	Christian Vital	6 ft 2 in (1.88 m)	187 lb (85 kg)	Sr	St. Thomas More	Queens, NY
G	2	James Bouknight	6 ft 4 in (1.93 m)	175 lb (79 kg)	Fr	The MacDuffie School	Brooklyn, NY
G	3	Alterique Gilbert	6 ft 0 in (1.83 m)	180 lb (82 kg)	RS Jr	Miller Grove	Atlanta, GA
G	4	R. J. Cole (redshirt)	6 ft 1 in (1.85 m)	185 lb (84 kg)	Jr	Howard	Union, NJ
F	5	Isaiah Whaley	6 ft 8 in (2.03 m)	220 lb (100 kg)	Jr	Mt. Zion Prep	Gastonia, NC
G	10	Brendan Adams	6 ft 4 in (1.93 m)	200 lb (91 kg)	So	Calvert Hall College	Hanover, MD
F	12	Tyler Polley (injured)	6 ft 9 in (2.06 m)	204 lb (93 kg)	Jr	Sagemont	Miramar, FL
F	13	Richie Springs (redshirt)	6 ft 9 in (2.06 m)	220 lb (100 kg)	Fr	The MacDuffie School	Brooklyn, NY
G/F	15	Sidney Wilson (S)	6 ft 7 in (2.01 m)	180 lb (82 kg)	RS So	St. John's	Bronx, NY
F	23	Akok Akok (injured)	6 ft 9 in (2.06 m)	193 lb (88 kg)	RS Fr	Putnam Science Academy	Manchester, NH
F/C	25	Josh Carlton	6 ft 11 in (2.11 m)	260 lb (118 kg)	Jr	DeMatha Catholic	Winterville, NC
G	41	Matt Garry (injured) (W)	6 ft 5 in (1.96 m)	188 lb (85 kg)	So	St. Paul Catholic	Southington, CT
G	45	Omotayo Aiyegbusi (W)	6 ft 4 in (1.93 m)	200 lb (91 kg)	Sr	Saint Joseph's	Conshohocken, PA

Head coach

- Dan Hurley (Seton Hall)

Assistant coach(es)

- Tom Moore (Boston University)
- Kimani Young (UTEP)
- Kenya Hunter (Duquesne)
- Taliek Brown (Connecticut)

Legend

- (C) Team captain
- (S) Suspended
- (I) Ineligible
- (W) Walk-on
- Injured
- Current redshirt

Roster
Last update: November 9, 2019

- Feb 28, 2020 - Sidney Wilson was suspended for the rest of the season for a violation of team policy.

== Schedule and results ==
Date time, TV	Rank^{#}	Opponent^{#}	Result	Record	High points	High rebounds	High assists	Site (attendance) city, state
Exhibition
October 30, 2019*; 7:00 pm, HuskyVision		Saint Michael's	W 103–64		21 – Gilbert	8 – Vital	6 – Vital	XL Center (7,370); Hartford, CT
Regular season
November 8, 2019*; 7:00 pm, SNY		Sacred Heart	W 89–67	1–0	18 – Carlton	8 – Carlton	5 – Gilbert	Harry A. Gampel Pavilion (10,167); Storrs, CT
November 13, 2019*; 7:00 pm, CBSSN		Saint Joseph's; Charleston Classic non bracket game	L 87–96	1–1	26 – Vital	16 – Vital	2 – Tied	Harry A. Gampel Pavilion (4,081); Storrs, CT
November 17, 2019*; 3:00 pm, ESPN		No. 15 Florida	W 62–59	2–1	15 – Tied	8 – Tied	5 – Vital	Harry A. Gampel Pavilion (10,167); Storrs, CT
November 21, 2019*; 9:00 pm, ESPNU		vs. Buffalo; Charleston Classic quarterfinal	W 79–68	3–1	20 – Adams	10 – Tied	5 – Vital	TD Arena (4,003); Charleston, SC
November 22, 2019*; 9:30 pm, ESPNU		vs. No. 18 Xavier; Charleston Classic semifinal	L 74–75 ^{2OT}	3–2	19 – Bouknight	12 – Vital	5 – Gilbert	TD Arena (4,416); Charleston, SC
November 24, 2019*; 1:00 pm, ESPN2		vs. Miami; Charleston Classic 3rd place game	W 80–55	4–2	16 – Carlton	7 – Akok	7 – Gilbert	TD Arena (3,122); Charleston, SC
December 1, 2019*; 1:00 pm, SNY		Maine	W 64–40	5–2	15 – Bouknight	5 – Tied	5 – Vital	XL Center (7,129); Hartford, CT
December 4, 2019*; 7:00 pm, SNY		Iona	W 80–62	6–2	19 – Carlton	12 – Carlton	10 – Gilbert	Harry A. Gampel Pavilion (5,909); Storrs, CT
December 10, 2019*; 9:00 pm, ESPN		vs. Indiana; Jimmy V Classic	L 54–57	6–3	18 – Carlton	8 – Vital	8 – Gilbert	Madison Square Garden (10,945); New York City, NY
December 18, 2019*; 7:00 pm, SNY		St. Peter's	W 66–56	7–3	12 – Polley	8 – Akok	6 – Gilbert	XL Center (7,514); Hartford, CT
December 22, 2019*; 1:00 pm, SNY		New Hampshire	W 88–62	8–3	21 – Gilbert	7 – Tied	5 – Gaffney	XL Center (9,374); Hartford, CT
December 29, 2019*; 1:00 pm, SNY		NJIT	W 69–47	9–3	23 – Vital	10 – Akok	7 – Gaffney	XL Center (10,507); Hartford, CT
January 1, 2020; 7:00 pm, CBSSN		at Cincinnati	L 51–67	9–4 (0–1)	11 – Adams	9 – Akok	3 – Vital	Fifth Third Arena (10,833); Cincinnati, OH
January 4, 2020; 2:00 pm, ESPNU		at South Florida	L 60–75	9–5 (0–2)	11 – Bouknight	6 – Bouknight	8 – Gilbert	Yuengling Center (4,694); Tampa, FL
January 8, 2020; 9:00 pm, CBSSN		Tulane	W 67–61	10–5 (1–2)	19 – Polley	11 – Polley	7 – Gilbert	Harry A. Gampel Pavilion (5,721); Storrs, CT
January 12, 2020; 12:00 pm, CBSSN		No. 23 Wichita State	L 86–89 ^{2OT}	10–6 (1–3)	25 – Vital	12 – Carlton	3 – Tied	XL Center (13,281); Hartford, CT
January 18, 2020*; 12:00 pm, FS1		at No. 14 Villanova	L 55–61	10–7	13 – Vital	8 – Vital	5 – Gilbert	Wells Fargo Center (16,723); Philadelphia, PA
January 23, 2020; 9:00 pm, ESPNU		at No. 25 Houston	L 59–63	10–8 (1–4)	14 – Vital	11 – Whaley	4 – Gilbert	Fertitta Center (7,035); Houston, TX
January 26, 2020; 12:00 pm, CBSSN		Tulsa	L 75–79 ^{OT}	10–9 (1–5)	16 – Bouknight	7 – 3 tied	5 – Gaffney	XL Center (10,509); Hartford, CT
January 29, 2020; 7:00 pm, ESPNews		Temple	W 78–63	11–9 (2–5)	15 – Vital	10 – Vital	5 – Gaffney	Harry A. Gampel Pavilion (7,886); Storrs, CT
February 1, 2020; 1:00 pm, CBS		at Memphis	L 63–70	11–10 (2–6)	20 – Vital	9 – Whaley	3 – Tied	FedExForum (16,240); Memphis, TN
February 6, 2020; 7:00 pm, ESPN2		at Tulsa	W 72–56	12–10 (3–6)	22 – Bouknight	12 – Whaley	3 – Gilbert	Reynolds Center (4,630); Tulsa, OK
February 9, 2020; 12:00 pm, CBSSN		Cincinnati	W 72–71 ^{OT}	13–10 (4–6)	23 – Bouknight	10 – Carlton	4 – Vital	Harry A. Gampel Pavilion (9,409); Storrs, CT
February 12, 2020; 7:00 pm, ESPNews		at SMU	L 75–79	13–11 (4–7)	21 – Bouknight	7 – Whaley	7 – Vital	Moody Coliseum (4,249); Dallas, TX
February 16, 2020; 3:00 pm, ESPN		Memphis	W 64–61	14–11 (5–7)	23 – Vital	13 – Carlton	4 – Gaffney	XL Center (15,564); Hartford, CT
February 20, 2020; 7:00 pm, ESPN2		at Temple	L 89–93 ^{2OT}	14–12 (5–8)	21 – Vital	14 – Whaley	9 – Gaffney	Liacouras Center (6,604); Philadelphia, PA
February 23, 2020; 2:00 pm, CBSSN		South Florida	W 78–71	15–12 (6–8)	24 – Vital	6 – Vital	4 – Adams	Harry A. Gampel Pavilion (9,524); Storrs, CT
February 26, 2020; 7:00 pm, ESPNU		UCF	W 81–65	16–12 (7–8)	18 – Tied	11 – Whaley	5 – Tied	XL Center (9,480); Hartford, CT
February 29, 2020; 2:00 pm, ESPNU		at East Carolina	W 84–63	17–12 (8–8)	27 – Vital	10 – Bouknight	4 – Bouknight	Minges Coliseum (5,003); Greenville, NC
March 5, 2020; 7:00 pm, CBSSN		No. 21 Houston	W 77–71	18–12 (9–8)	26 – Vital	7 – Bouknight	2 – Tied	Harry A. Gampel Pavilion (10,167); Storrs, CT
March 8, 2020; 4:00 pm, ESPNU		at Tulane	W 80–76	19–12 (10–8)	28 – Vital	10 – Whaley	4 – Gilbert	Devlin Fieldhouse (1,897); New Orleans, LA
AAC Tournament
March 12, 2020; 2:00 pm, CBS	(5)	vs. (12) Tulane; First Round	Cancelled due to the COVID-19 pandemic					Dickies Arena; Fort Worth, TX
*Non-conference game. ^{#}Rankings from AP Poll. (#) Tournament seedings in parentheses. All times are in Eastern Time.

== Awards and honors ==
=== American Athletic Conference honors ===
==== All-AAC First Team ====
- Christian Vital

==== All-AAC Third Team ====
- James Bouknight

==== All Freshman Team ====
- James Bouknight

==== Player of the Week ====
- Week 14: James Bouknight
- Week 17: Christian Vital
- Week 18: Christian Vital

==== Rookie of the Week ====
- Week 3: James Bouknight
- Week 15: James Bouknight
