= 2019–20 Houston Cougars men's basketball team =

American college basketball season

2019–20 Houston Cougars men's basketball

AAC regular season co-champions Diamond Head Classic champions
- Conference: American Athletic Conference

Ranking
- Coaches: No. 23
- AP: No. 22
- Record: 23–8 (13–5 AAC)
- Head coach: Kelvin Sampson (6th season)
- Assistant coaches: Alvin Brooks; Kellen Sampson; Quannas White
- Home arena: Fertitta Center

2019–20 American Athletic Conference men's basketball standings
	Conf.				Overall
Team	W		L	PCT	W		L	PCT
Cincinnati	13	–	5	.722	20	–	10	.667
No. 22 Houston	13	–	5	.722	23	–	8	.742
Tulsa	13	–	5	.722	21	–	10	.677
Wichita State	11	–	7	.611	23	–	8	.742
UConn	10	–	8	.556	19	–	12	.613
Memphis	10	–	8	.556	21	–	10	.677
SMU	9	–	9	.500	19	–	11	.633
UCF	7	–	11	.389	16	–	14	.533
South Florida	7	–	11	.389	14	–	17	.452
Temple	6	–	12	.333	14	–	17	.452
East Carolina	5	–	13	.278	11	–	20	.355
Tulane	4	–	14	.222	12	–	18	.400
Note: The 2020 AAC tournament was canceled due to the COVID-19 pandemic. Rankings from AP poll

The 2019–20 Houston Cougars men's basketball team represented the University of Houston during the 2019–20 NCAA Division I men's basketball season. The Cougars were led by sixth-year head coach Kelvin Sampson as members of the American Athletic Conference. This was the second season that the team played its home games at the Fertitta Center. The AP poll released on January 13th had the Cougars ranked outside the top 25, and to date, it is the most recent poll in which the Cougars were unranked. They have since begun a streak of 102 weeks ranked in the AP Top 25, the 17th longest streak in division 1 men’s college basketball history.

== Previous season ==
Houston finished the 2018–19 regular season 29–2, including an AAC-best 16–2 record in conference play. They were the runner-up in the American Athletic Conference tournament, falling 69–57 to Cincinnati in the final. The Cougars earned the #3 seed in the Midwest Region of the NCAA tournament, where they went 2–1, advancing to the Sweet Sixteen before falling 62–58 to Kentucky. Houston's final overall season record of 33–4 set a program record for wins.

Shortly after the conclusion of the 2018–19 season, Kelvin Sampson agreed to a six-season contract to remain Head Coach at Houston.

== Offseason ==
=== Departures ===
Name	Number	Pos.	Height	Weight	Year	Hometown	Reason for departure
Landon Goesling	2	G	6'2"	175	Graduate Student	Bakersfield, CA	Graduated
Armoni Brooks	3	G	6'3"	195	Junior	Round Rock, TX	Play professionally
Corey Davis Jr.	5	G	6'1"	190	Senior	Lafayette, LA	Graduated
Neil VanBeck	15	G	6'4"	200	Freshman	Houston, TX	Walk-on; left team
Breaon Brady	24	F	6'8"	260	Senior	Akron, OH	Graduated
Galen Robinson Jr.	25	G	6'1"	190	Senior	Houston, TX	Graduated

=== Incoming transfers ===
Name	Number	Pos.	Height	Weight	Year	Hometown	Previous School
Cameron Tyson	5	G	6'2"	200	Sophomore	Bothell, WA	Transferred from Idaho. Under NCAA transfer rules, Tyson has to sit out the 2019–20 season. Tyson will have three years of remaining eligibility.
Quentin Grimes	24	G	6'5"	205	Sophomore	The Woodlands, TX	Transferred from Kansas. Grimes was granted a waiver for immediate eligibility. Will have three years of remaining eligibility.

=== Recruiting class of 2020 ===
College recruiting information (2020)
Name	Hometown	School	Height	Weight	Commit date
Tramon Mark; PG	Dickinson, TX	Dickinson High School	6 ft 4 in (1.93 m)	180 lb (82 kg)	Apr 17, 2019
Tramon Mark; PG	Recruit ratings: Rivals: 247Sports: (83)				
Jamal Shead; PG	Manor, TX	Manor High School	6 ft 1 in (1.85 m)	175 lb (79 kg)	May 27, 2019
Jamal Shead; PG	Recruit ratings: Rivals: 247Sports: (80)				
Kiyron Powell; C	Evansville, IN	Benjamin Bosse High School	6 ft 9 in (2.06 m)	205 lb (93 kg)	Aug 6, 2019
Kiyron Powell; C	Recruit ratings: Rivals: 247Sports: (76)				
Overall recruit ranking: 247Sports: 27
Note: In many cases, Scout, Rivals, 247Sports, On3, and ESPN may conflict in their listings of height and weight.; In these cases, the average was taken. ESPN grades are on a 100-point scale.; Sources: "2020 Team Ranking". Rivals.

=== AAC media poll ===
The AAC media poll was released on October 14, 2019, with the Cougars tied for first place with the Memphis Tigers. However, the Cougars received more 1st place votes in the poll.

Media poll
Predicted finish	Team	Votes (1st place)
T-1	Houston	113 (7)
T-1	Memphis	113 (4)
3	Cincinnati	94 (1)
4	Wichita State	88
5	USF	79
6	UConn	75
7	Temple	72
8	SMU	47
9	UCF	40
10	Tulsa	36
11	East Carolina	20
12	Tulane	15

== Roster ==
2019–20 Houston Cougars men's basketball team
Players
Coaches

Pos.	#	Name	Height	Weight	Year	Previous school	Hometown
G	0	Marcus Sasser	6 ft 1 in (1.85 m)	200 lb (91 kg)	Fr	Red Oak High School	Red Oak, TX
C	1	Chris Harris Jr.	6 ft 10 in (2.08 m)	255 lb (116 kg)	RS Sr	San Jacinto JC	Houston, TX
G	2	Caleb Mills	6 ft 3 in (1.91 m)	165 lb (75 kg)	RS Fr	T. C. Roberson High School	Arden, NC
G	3	DeJon Jarreau	6 ft 5 in (1.96 m)	185 lb (84 kg)	RS Jr	UMass	New Orleans, LA
F	4	Justin Gorham	6 ft 7 in (2.01 m)	235 lb (107 kg)	RS Jr	Towson	Baltimore, MD
G	5	Cameron Tyson (redshirt)	6 ft 2 in (1.88 m)	200 lb (91 kg)	So	Idaho	Bothell, WA
G	11	Nate Hinton	6 ft 5 in (1.96 m)	210 lb (95 kg)	So	Gaston Day School	Gastonia, NC
F	13	J'Wan Roberts (redshirt)	6 ft 6 in (1.98 m)	210 lb (95 kg)	Fr	Shoemaker High School	Saint Thomas, USVI
F	23	Cedrick Alley Jr.	6 ft 6 in (1.98 m)	225 lb (102 kg)	RS So	Klein Forest High School	Houston, TX
G	24	Quentin Grimes	6 ft 5 in (1.96 m)	205 lb (93 kg)	So	Kansas	The Woodlands, TX
C	30	Caleb Broodo (W)	6 ft 8 in (2.03 m)	240 lb (109 kg)	RS So	Dow High School	Midland, MI
F	35	Fabian White Jr.	6 ft 7 in (2.01 m)	230 lb (104 kg)	Jr	Atascocita High School	Atascocita, TX
F/C	55	Brison Gresham	6 ft 8 in (2.03 m)	230 lb (104 kg)	RS Jr	UMass	New Orleans, LA

Head coach

- Kelvin Sampson (UNC Pembroke)

Assistant coach(es)

- Alvin Brooks (Lamar)
- Kellen Sampson (Oklahoma)
- Quannas White (Oklahoma)

Legend

- (C) Team captain
- (S) Suspended
- (I) Ineligible
- (W) Walk-on
- Injured
- Current redshirt

Roster

== Schedule and results ==
Date time, TV	Rank^{#}	Opponent^{#}	Result	Record	High points	High rebounds	High assists	Site (attendance) city, state
Exhibition
November 9, 2019*; 5:00 pm		Angelo State	W 106–42	0–0	18 – Hinton	13 – Hinton	5 – Sasser	Fertitta Center (5,205); Houston, TX
Non-conference regular season
November 12, 2019*; 7:00 pm, ESPNU		Alabama State	W 84–56	1–0	14 – Sasser	8 – Hinton	4 – Tied	Fertitta Center (6,430); Houston, TX
November 15, 2019*; 8:00 pm, ESPNU		BYU	L 71–72	1–1	17 – Mills	7 – Hinton	2 – Tied	Fertitta Center (7,035); Houston, TX
November 19, 2019*; 7:00 pm, Facebook		at Rice; Rivalry	W 97–89	2–1	32 – Grimes	12 – White	5 – Grimes	Tudor Fieldhouse (2,513); Houston, TX
November 22, 2019*; 8:00 pm, P12N		at No. 11 Oregon	L 66–78	2–2	21 – Mills	8 – Gresham	4 – Grimes	Matthew Knight Arena (8,095); Eugene, OR
November 26, 2019*; 7:00 pm, ESPN3		Houston Baptist	W 112–73	3–2	24 – Hinton	15 – Hinton	6 – Jarreau	Fertitta Center (5,862); Houston, TX
December 4, 2019*; 7:00 pm, ESPN3		Texas State	W 68–60	4–2	21 – Grimes	12 – Harris Jr.	3 – Grimes	Fertitta Center (6,461); Houston, TX
December 8, 2019*; 11:00 am, ESPNU		at South Carolina; American/SEC Alliance	W 76–56	5–2	24 – Grimes	11 – Hinton	4 – Jarreau	Colonial Life Arena (11,164); Columbia, SC
December 11, 2019*; 7:00 pm, ESPN3		UT Arlington	W 71–63	6–2	25 – Hinton	10 – Hinton	6 – Jarreau	Fertitta Center (6,657); Houston, TX
December 15, 2019*; 2:00 pm, ESPN		Oklahoma State	L 55–61	6–3	23 – Mills	9 – Hinton	2 – White	Fertitta Center (7,035); Houston, TX
December 19, 2019*; 7:00 pm, ESPN3		UTEP; Diamond Head Classic non-bracket game	W 77–57	7–3	17 – Tied	12 – Gresham	9 – Jarreau	Fertitta Center (6,470); Houston, TX
December 22, 2019*; 2:00 pm, ESPNU		vs. Portland; Diamond Head Classic quarterfinals	W 81–56	8–3	18 – Grimes	10 – Hinton	6 – Grimes	Stan Sheriff Center; Honolulu, HI
December 23, 2019*; 6:00 pm, ESPN2		vs. Georgia Tech; Diamond Head Classic semifinals	W 70–59	9–3	26 – Grimes	12 – White Jr.	3 – Mills	Stan Sheriff Center (5,585); Honolulu, HI
December 25, 2019*; 7:30 pm, ESPN2		vs. No. 21 Washington; Diamond Head Classic final	W 75–71	10–3	19 – Tied	8 – Hinton	6 – Grimes	Stan Sheriff Center (6,356); Honolulu, HI
AAC regular season
January 3, 2020; 6:00 pm, ESPN2		UCF	W 78–63	11–3 (1–0)	20 – Hinton	16 – Hinton	4 – Tied	Fertitta Center (7,035); Houston, TX
January 7, 2020; 6:00 pm, CBSSN		at Temple	W 78–74	12–3 (2–0)	23 – Mills	13 – Hinton	5 – Tied	Liacouras Center (4,366); Philadelphia, PA
January 11, 2020; 3:00 pm, ESPN2		at Tulsa	L 61–63	12–4 (2–1)	22 – Mills	10 – Hinton	3 – Hinton	Reynolds Center (3,725); Tulsa, OK
January 15, 2020; 8:00 pm, CBSSN		SMU; Rivalry	W 71–62	13–4 (3–1)	17 – White Jr.	10 – White Jr.	3 – Grimes	Fertitta Center (6,584); Houston, TX
January 18, 2020; 3:00 pm, ESPN2		at No. 16 Wichita State	W 65–54	14–4 (4–1)	14 – White Jr.	10 – Jarreau	6 – Jarreau	Charles Koch Arena (10,506); Wichita, KS
January 23, 2020; 8:00 pm, ESPNU	No. 25	UConn	W 63–59	15–4 (5–1)	20 – Mills	11 – Jarreau	8 – Jarreau	Fertitta Center (7,035); Houston, TX
January 26, 2020; 1:00 pm, CBSSN	No. 25	South Florida	W 68–49	16–4 (6–1)	12 – Jarreau	8 – Harris Jr.	6 – Jarreau	Fertitta Center (6,364); Houston, TX
January 29, 2020; 6:00 pm, ESPN3	No. 21	at East Carolina	W 69–59	17–4 (7–1)	18 – Mills	10 – Harris Jr.	6 – Mills	Williams Arena (4,406); Greenville, NC
February 1, 2020; 5:00 pm, ESPN2	No. 21	at Cincinnati	L 62–64	17–5 (7–2)	17 – Sasser	8 – Hinton	6 – Jarreau	Fifth Third Arena (12,189); Cincinnati, OH
February 6, 2020; 8:00 pm, ESPNU	No. 25	Tulane	W 75–62	18–5 (8–2)	18 – Mills	12 – Hinton	7 – Hinton	Fertitta Center (6,430); Houston, TX
February 9, 2020; 2:00 pm, ESPN	No. 25	Wichita State	W 76–43	19–5 (9–2)	14 – Grimes	9 – Hinton	5 – Grimes	Fertitta Center (7,135); Houston, TX
February 12, 2020; 8:00 pm, ESPNU	No. 20	at South Florida	W 62–58	20–5 (10–2)	22 – Grimes	7 – Harris Jr.	5 – Tied	Yuengling Center (4,548); Tampa, FL
February 15, 2020; 5:00 pm, ESPNU	No. 20	at SMU; Rivalry	L 72–73 ^{OT}	20–6 (10–3)	26 – Sasser	10 – Harris Jr.	4 – Hinton	Moody Coliseum (5,534); Dallas, TX
February 19, 2020; 8:00 pm, ESPN2/ESPNU	No. 22	Tulsa	W 76–43	21–6 (11–3)	27 – Mills	7 – White Jr.	6 – Jarreau	Fertitta Center (6,732); Houston, TX
February 22, 2020; 1:00 pm, ESPN2	No. 22	at Memphis	L 59–60	21–7 (11–4)	21 – Mills	12 – Hinton	3 – Tied	FedExForum (17,735); Memphis, TN
March 1, 2020; 12:00 pm, ESPN	No. 25	Cincinnati	W 68–55	22–7 (12–4)	21 – Sasser	11 – Harris Jr.	4 – Jarreau	Fertitta Center (7,096); Houston, TX
March 5, 2020; 6:00 pm, CBSSN	No. 21	at UConn	L 71–77	22–8 (12–5)	24 – Grimes	6 – Tied	6 – Sasser	Gampel Pavilion (10,167); Storrs, CT
March 8, 2020; 11:00 am, CBS	No. 21	Memphis	W 64–57	23–8 (13–5)	18 – White Jr.	14 – White Jr.	3 – Tied	Fertitta Center (7,129); Houston, TX
AAC Tournament
March 13, 2020; 6:30 pm, ESPNU	(2) No. 22	vs. (7) SMU / (10) Temple; Quarterfinals	Cancelled					Dickies Arena; Fort Worth, TX
*Non-conference game. ^{#}Rankings from AP Poll. (#) Tournament seedings in parentheses. All times are in Central Time.

1.Cancelled due to the Coronavirus Pandemic

== Rankings ==
Ranking movements Legend: ██ Increase in ranking ██ Decrease in ranking — = Not ranked RV = Received votes т = Tied with team above or below
	Week																			
Poll	Pre	1	2	3	4	5	6	7	8	9	10	11	12	13	14	15	16	17	18	Final
AP	RV	RV	—	—	—	—	—	—	RV	RV	RV	25	21	25	20	22	25	21	22-T	22
Coaches	RV	RV*	—	—	—	—	—	—	RV	RV	RV	24	20	25	19	22	RV	21	24	23

*Coaches did not release a Week 2 poll

== Awards and honors ==
=== American Athletic Conference honors ===
==== All-AAC Second Team ====
- Nate Hinton
- Caleb Mills

==== All Freshman Team ====
- Caleb Mills

==== Player of the Week ====
- Week 5: Quentin Grimes
- Week 8: Fabian White Jr.

==== Rookie of the Week ====
- Week 6: Caleb Mills
- Week 12: Caleb Mills
- Week 17: Marcus Sasser
