= 2019–20 Wichita State Shockers men's basketball team =

American college basketball season

2019–20 Wichita State Shockers men's basketball
- Conference: American Athletic Conference
- Record: 23–8 (11–7 AAC)
- Head coach: Gregg Marshall (13th season)
- Assistant coaches: Isaac Brown; Tyson Waterman; Lou Gudino
- Home arena: Charles Koch Arena

2019–20 American Athletic Conference men's basketball standings
	Conf.				Overall
Team	W		L	PCT	W		L	PCT
Cincinnati	13	–	5	.722	20	–	10	.667
No. 22 Houston	13	–	5	.722	23	–	8	.742
Tulsa	13	–	5	.722	21	–	10	.677
Wichita State	11	–	7	.611	23	–	8	.742
UConn	10	–	8	.556	19	–	12	.613
Memphis	10	–	8	.556	21	–	10	.677
SMU	9	–	9	.500	19	–	11	.633
UCF	7	–	11	.389	16	–	14	.533
South Florida	7	–	11	.389	14	–	17	.452
Temple	6	–	12	.333	14	–	17	.452
East Carolina	5	–	13	.278	11	–	20	.355
Tulane	4	–	14	.222	12	–	18	.400
Note: The 2020 AAC tournament was canceled due to the COVID-19 pandemic. Rankings from AP poll

The 2019–20 Wichita State Shockers men's basketball team represented Wichita State University in the 2019–20 NCAA Division I men's basketball season. They played their home games at Charles Koch Arena in Wichita, Kansas and were led by head coach Gregg Marshall, who coached in his 13th and final season at the school. They are members of the American Athletic Conference.

== Previous season ==
The Shockers finished the 2018–19 season 22–15, 10–8 in AAC play and finished in sixth place. In the first round of the AAC tournament the Shockers would go on to win against the 11 seeded East Carolina, would beat Temple in the quarterfinals, but would lose in the semifinals to the eventual champions of the AAC, Cincinnati.

Wichita State would receive a six seed in the NIT and would beat Furman in the first round, beat Clemson in the second round, and beat Indiana, but would lose to Lipscomb in the semifinals.

== Offseason ==
=== Departures ===
Name	Number	Pos.	Height	Weight	Year	Hometown	Reason
Markis McDuffie	1	F	6'8"	218	Senior	Paterson, New Jersey	Graduated
Ricky Torres	3	G	6'2"	189	Junior	Pinellas Park, Florida	Transferred to Illinois State
Samajae Haynes-Jones	4	G	6'0"	180	Senior	Wichita, Kansas	Graduated
Rod Brown	5	F	6'6"	215	RS Freshman	Cordova, Tennessee	Transferred to Pearl River CC
Eli Farrakhan	11	G	5'11"	165	Junior	Melbourne, Florida	Transferred to Newman
Teddy Allen	23	F	6'5"	220	Sophomore	Mesa, Arizona	Dismissed from team, transferred to Western Nebraska CC

=== 2019 recruiting class ===
College recruiting information
Name	Hometown	School	Height	Weight	Commit date
DeAntoni Gordon; F	Mobile, Alabama	LeFlore Magnet High School	6 ft 7 in (2.01 m)	210 lb (95 kg)	
DeAntoni Gordon; F	Recruit ratings: 247Sports: (80)				
Grant Sherfield; G	Wichita, Kansas	Sunrise Christian Academy	6 ft 2 in (1.88 m)	180 lb (82 kg)	Apr 16, 2019
Grant Sherfield; G	Recruit ratings: Rivals: 247Sports: (80)				
Noah Fernandes; G	Mattapoisett, Massachusetts	Woodstock Academy	5 ft 11 in (1.80 m)	155 lb (70 kg)	
Noah Fernandes; G	Recruit ratings: Rivals: 247Sports: (80)				
Tyson Etienne; G	Englewood, New Jersey	Putnam Science Academy	6 ft 2 in (1.88 m)	180 lb (82 kg)	Oct 13, 2018
Tyson Etienne; G	Recruit ratings: Rivals: 247Sports: (80)				
Josaphat Bilau; F	La Roche-sur-Yon, France	SPIRE Institute	6 ft 11 in (2.11 m)	230 lb (100 kg)	
Josaphat Bilau; F	Recruit ratings: Rivals: 247Sports: (NR)				
Overall recruit ranking:
Note: In many cases, Scout, Rivals, 247Sports, On3, and ESPN may conflict in their listings of height and weight.; In these cases, the average was taken. ESPN grades are on a 100-point scale.; Sources: "2019 Team Ranking". Rivals.

=== Incoming transfers ===
Name	Num.	Pos.	Height	Weight	Year	Hometown	Previous school
Trey Wade	5	F	6'6"	219	Junior	Marietta, GA	Junior college transferred from South Plains CC.

== Roster ==
2019–20 Wichita State Shockers men's basketball team
Players
Coaches

Pos.	#	Name	Height	Weight	Year	Previous school	Hometown
G	0	Dexter Dennis	6 ft 5 in (1.96 m)	207 lb (94 kg)	So	Believe Academy	Baker, Louisiana
G	1	Tyson Etienne	6 ft 1 in (1.85 m)	192 lb (87 kg)	Fr	Putnam Science Academy	Englewood, New Jersey
G	2	Jamarius Burton	6 ft 3 in (1.91 m)	200 lb (91 kg)	So	Independence HS	Charlotte, North Carolina
F	3	DeAntoni Gordon	6 ft 7 in (2.01 m)	210 lb (95 kg)	Fr	LeFlore Magnet HS	Mobile, Alabama
F	5	Trey Wade	6 ft 6 in (1.98 m)	219 lb (99 kg)	Jr	South Plains CC	Marietta, Georgia
G	10	Erik Stevenson	6 ft 3 in (1.91 m)	198 lb (90 kg)	So	Timberline HS	Lacey, Washington
G	11	Noah Fernandes	5 ft 11 in (1.8 m)	172 lb (78 kg)	Fr	Woodstock Academy	Mattapoisett, Massachusetts
G	14	Jacob Herrs (W)	6 ft 2 in (1.88 m)	185 lb (84 kg)	Jr	Andover HS	Wichita, Kansas
G	15	Brycen Bush (W)	6 ft 0 in (1.83 m)	165 lb (75 kg)	Jr	Eisenhower HS	Wichita, Kansas
C	21	Jaime Echenique	6 ft 11 in (2.11 m)	258 lb (117 kg)	Sr	Trinity Valley CC	Barranquilla, Colombia
C	24	Morris Udeze	6 ft 8 in (2.03 m)	240 lb (109 kg)	So	Montverde Academy	Houston, Texas
G	32	Tate Busse (W)	6 ft 2 in (1.88 m)	185 lb (84 kg)	RS Fr	St. Francis HS	St. Francis, Kansas
C	33	Asbjørn Midtgaard	7 ft 0 in (2.13 m)	267 lb (121 kg)	Jr	Espergarte Gymnasium	Helsingør, Denmark
F	40	Josaphat Bilau (redshirt)	6 ft 10 in (2.08 m)	232 lb (105 kg)	Fr	Spire Academy	La Roche-sur-Yon, France
F/C	44	Isaiah Poor Bear-Chandler	6 ft 9 in (2.06 m)	250 lb (113 kg)	So	Sunrise Christian Academy	Omaha, Nebraska
G	52	Grant Sherfield	6 ft 2 in (1.88 m)	189 lb (86 kg)	Fr	Sunrise Christian Academy	Wichita, Kansas

Head coach

- Gregg Marshall (Randolph–Macon)

Assistant coach(es)

- Isaac Brown (Louisiana–Monroe)
- Tyson Waterman (Winthrop)
- Lou Gudino (Incarnate Word)

Legend

- (C) Team captain
- (S) Suspended
- (I) Ineligible
- (W) Walk-on
- Injured
- Current redshirt

Roster
Last update: November 11, 2019

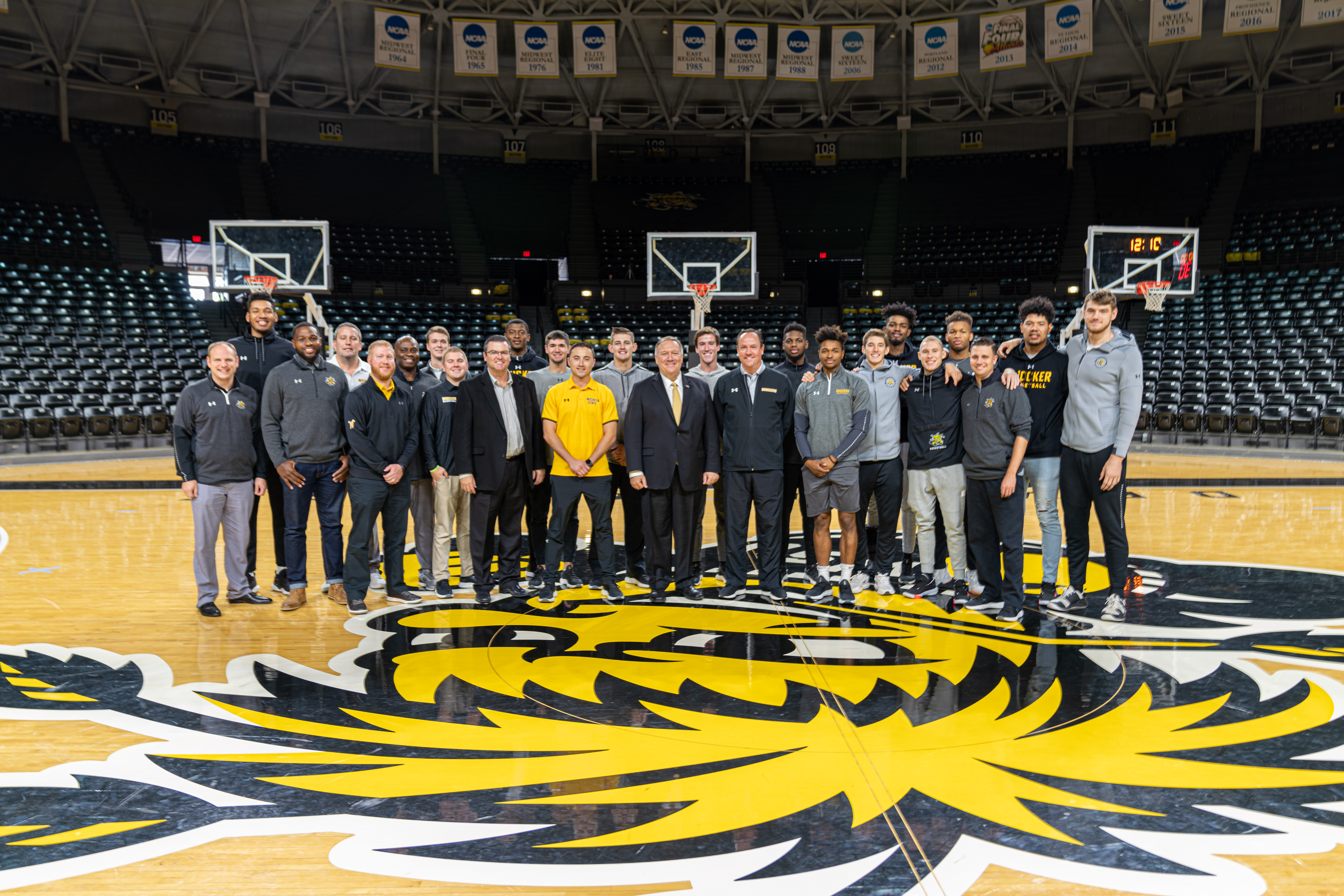
The Shockers with Mike Pompeo on October 25, 2019

== Schedule and results ==
Date time, TV	Rank^{#}	Opponent^{#}	Result	Record	High points	High rebounds	High assists	Site (attendance) city, state
Exhibition
October 29, 2019*; 7:00 pm, Cox YurView		Northeastern State	W 92–57		18 – Sherfield	9 – Wade	6 – Burton	Charles Koch Arena (9,918); Wichita, KS
Regular season
November 5, 2019*; 7:00 pm, Cox YurView		Omaha	W 68–54	1–0	19 – Wade	11 – Wade	6 – Sherfield	Charles Koch Arena (10,056); Wichita, KS
November 9, 2019*; 2:00 pm, Cox YurView		Texas Southern	W 69–63	2–0	22 – Stevenson	10 – Wade	2 – Wade	Charles Koch Arena (10,108); Wichita, KS
November 16, 2019*; 2:00 pm, Cox YurView		UT Martin; Cancún Challenge campus game	W 103–62	3–0	21 – Etienne	8 – Wade	6 – Tied	Charles Koch Arena (10,123); Wichita, KS
November 19, 2019*; 7:00 pm, Cox YurView		Gardner–Webb; Cancún Challenge campus game	W 74–52	4–0	15 – Burton, Udeze	5 – Wade, Midtgaard	5 – Stevenson	Charles Koch Arena (10,004); Wichita, KS
November 23, 2019*; 2:00 pm, Cox YurView		Oral Roberts	W 68–59	5–0	14 – Wade	8 – Stevenson	9 – Stevenson	Charles Koch Arena (10,075); Wichita, KS
November 26, 2019*; 5:00 pm, CBSSN		vs. South Carolina; Cancún Challenge semifinal	W 70–47	6–0	19 – Stevenson	8 – Stevenson	5 – Burton	Hard Rock Hotel Riviera (1,311); Cancún, Mexico
November 27, 2019*; 7:30 pm, CBSSN		vs. West Virginia; Cancún Challenge championship game	L 63–75	6–1	22 – Stevenson	11 – Echenique	1 – Tied	Hard Rock Hotel Riviera (1,729); Cancún, Mexico
December 5, 2019*; 7:00 pm, Cox YurView		Central Arkansas	W 95–69	7–1	15 – Sherfield	16 – Udeze	5 – Sherfield	Charles Koch Arena (10,018); Wichita, KS
December 8, 2019*; 1:00 pm, ESPNU		at Oklahoma State	W 80–61	8–1	19 – Etienne	8 – Burton	11 – Burton	Gallagher-Iba Arena (7,945); Stillwater, OK
December 14, 2019*; 5:00 pm, ESPN2		Oklahoma	W 80–75	9–1	16 – Stevenson	15 – Wade	3 – Tied	Intrust Bank Arena (10,727); Wichita, KS
December 21, 2019*; 11:00 am, ESPN2		VCU	W 73–63	10–1	14 – Echenique	8 – Burton	5 – Burton	Charles Koch Arena (10,506); Wichita, KS
December 29, 2019*; 2:00 pm, Cox YurView		Abilene Christian	W 84–66	11–1	15 – Sherfield	11 – Sherfield	5 – Burton	Charles Koch Arena (10,506); Wichita, KS
January 1, 2020; 2:00 pm, ESPNU	No. 24	East Carolina	W 75–69	12–1 (1–0)	17 – Stevenson	9 – Stevenson	5 – Stevenson	Charles Koch Arena (10,506); Wichita, KS
January 4, 2020*; 3:00 pm, ESPNU	No. 24	Ole Miss; American/SEC Alliance	W 74–54	13–1	29 – Stevenson	6 – Tied	4 – Burton	Charles Koch Arena (10,506); Wichita, KS
January 9, 2020; 6:00 pm, ESPN2	No. 23	No. 21 Memphis	W 76–67	14–1 (2–0)	16 – Burton	8 – Dennis	3 – Burton	Charles Koch Arena (10,506); Wichita, KS
January 12, 2020; 11:00 am, CBSSN	No. 23	at Connecticut	W 89–86 ^{2OT}	15–1 (3–0)	19 – Echenique	8 – Echenique	4 – Sherfield	XL Center (13,281); Hartford, CT
January 15, 2020; 8:00 pm, ESPNU	No. 16	at Temple	L 53–65	15–2 (3–1)	20 – Echenique	13 – Echenique	3 – Wade	Liacouras Center (5,390); Philadelphia, PA
January 18, 2020; 3:00 pm, ESPN2	No. 16	Houston	L 54–65	15–3 (3–2)	10 – Etienne	6 – Echenique	4 – Sherfield	Charles Koch Arena (10,506); Wichita, KS
January 21, 2020; 6:00 pm, ESPNews		at South Florida	W 56–43	16–3 (4–2)	13 – Etienne	7 – Wade	5 – Sherfield	Yuengling Center (3,304); Tampa, FL
January 25, 2020; 7:00 pm, ESPNU		UCF	W 87–79	17–3 (5–2)	18 – Dennis	11 – Dennis	6 – Sherfield	Charles Koch Arena (10,398); Wichita, KS
February 1, 2020; 5:00 pm, ESPNU	No. 23	at Tulsa; Rivalry	L 51–54	17–4 (5–3)	15 – Echenique	10 – Echenique	2 – Tied	Reynolds Center (8,089); Tulsa, OK
February 6, 2020; 6:00 pm, ESPN		Cincinnati	L 79–80	17–5 (5–4)	19 – Echenique	11 – Echenique	4 – Burton	Charles Koch Arena (10,211); Wichita, KS
February 9, 2020; 2:00 pm, ESPN		at No. 25 Houston	L 43–76	17–6 (5–5)	10 – Dennis	7 – Echenique	1 – Tied	Fertitta Center (7,135); Houston, TX
February 13, 2020; 6:00 pm, ESPN2		at UCF	W 75–58	18–6 (6–5)	27 – Stevenson	9 – Dennis	6 – Sherfield	Addition Financial Arena (5,553); Orlando, FL
February 16, 2020; 1:00 pm, CBSSN		Tulane	W 82–57	19–6 (7–5)	21 – Dennis	9 – Dennis	7 – Burton	Charles Koch Arena (10,506); Wichita, KS
February 20, 2020; 6:00 pm, CBSSN		South Florida	W 65–55	20–6 (8–5)	20 – Echenique	9 – Echenique	4 – Burton	Charles Koch Arena (10,098); Wichita, KS
February 23, 2020; 12:00 pm, ESPN		at Cincinnati	L 64–67	20–7 (8–6)	13 – Stevenson	12 – Echenique	34 – Tied	Fifth Third Arena (12,137); Cincinnati, OH
February 27, 2020; 7:00 pm, ESPN		Temple	W 72–69	21–7 (9–6)	21 – Wade	13 – Echenique	6 – Burton	Charles Koch Arena (10,112); Wichita, KS
March 1, 2020; 3:00 pm, ESPNU		at SMU	W 66–62	22–7 (10–6)	25 – Dennis	13 – Echenique	6 – Sherfield	Moody Coliseum (5,483); Dallas, TX
March 5, 2020; 8:00 pm, ESPN		at Memphis	L 60–68	22–8 (10–7)	15 – Dennis	9 – Wade	3 – Tied	FedEx Forum (17,021); Memphis, TN
March 8, 2020; 3:00 pm, CBSSN		Tulsa; Rivalry	W 79–57	23–8 (11–7)	14 – Burton	9 – Stevenson	5 – Burton	Charles Koch Arena (10,506); Wichita, KS
American Conference tournament
March 13, 2020; 2:00 pm, ESPN2	(4)	vs. (5) UConn / (12) Tulane; Quarterfinals	Cancelled					Dickies Arena; Fort Worth, TX
*Non-conference game. ^{#}Rankings from AP Poll. (#) Tournament seedings in parentheses. All times are in Central Time.

1. Cancelled due to the COVID-19 pandemic

== Rankings ==
Ranking movements Legend: ██ Increase in ranking ██ Decrease in ranking — = Not ranked RV = Received votes т = Tied with team above or below
	Week																				
Poll	Pre	1	2	3	4	5	6	7	8	9	10	11	12	13	14	15	16	17	18	19	Final
AP	—	—	—	—	—	—	RV	RV	24	23	16	RV	23	RV	—	—	—	RV			Not released
Coaches	—	—	—	—	RV	RV	RV	25	23	23	16	22T	22	RV	—	—	—	RV			

*AP does not release post-NCAA Tournament rankings

== Awards and honors ==
=== American Athletic Conference honors ===
==== All-AAC Second Team ====
- Jaime Echenique

==== Player of the Week ====
- Week 6: Erik Stevenson
- Week 9: Erik Stevenson

==== Rookie of the Week ====
- Week 5: Tyson Etienne
- Week 8: Grant Sherfield
