= 2019–20 Temple Owls men's basketball team =

Temple University NCAA team

2019–20 Temple Owls men's basketball
- Conference: American Athletic Conference
- Record: 14–17 (6–12 AAC)
- Head coach: Aaron McKie (1st season)
- Associate head coach: Monté Ross
- Assistant coaches: Chris Clark; Jimmy Fenerty
- Home arena: Liacouras Center

2019–20 American Athletic Conference men's basketball standings
	Conf.				Overall
Team	W		L	PCT	W		L	PCT
Cincinnati	13	–	5	.722	20	–	10	.667
No. 22 Houston	13	–	5	.722	23	–	8	.742
Tulsa	13	–	5	.722	21	–	10	.677
Wichita State	11	–	7	.611	23	–	8	.742
UConn	10	–	8	.556	19	–	12	.613
Memphis	10	–	8	.556	21	–	10	.677
SMU	9	–	9	.500	19	–	11	.633
UCF	7	–	11	.389	16	–	14	.533
South Florida	7	–	11	.389	14	–	17	.452
Temple	6	–	12	.333	14	–	17	.452
East Carolina	5	–	13	.278	11	–	20	.355
Tulane	4	–	14	.222	12	–	18	.400
Note: The 2020 AAC tournament was canceled due to the COVID-19 pandemic. Rankings from AP poll

The 2019–20 Temple Owls men's basketball team represented Temple University during the 2019–20 NCAA Division I men's basketball season. The Owls, led by first-year head coach Aaron McKie, played their home games at the Liacouras Center in Philadelphia as a member of the American Athletic Conference.

== Previous season ==
The Owls finished the 2018–19 season 23–10, 13–5 in AAC play to finish in third place. As the 3-seed in the AAC tournament, the Owls lost to sixth-seeded Wichita State in the first round. They received a bid to the NCAA tournament as an 11th seed, where they lost to Belmont in the First Four.

The season was Fran Dunphy's final season as Temple head coach. The school announced on April 13, 2018, that he would step down at the end of the 2019 season, and that top assistant and former Owls star Aaron McKie would succeed him.

== Offseason ==
=== Departures ===
Name	Number	Pos.	Height	Weight	Year	Hometown	Reason for departure
Shizz Alston	10	G	6'4"	180	Senior	Philadelphia, Pennsylvania	Graduated
Ernest Aflakpui	24	C	6'10"	240	Senior	Accra, Ghana	Graduated

=== Incoming transfers ===
Name	Number	Pos.	Height	Weight	Year	Hometown	Previous school
Jake Forrester	10	F	6'8"	215	Sophomore	Harrisburg, Pennsylvania	Transferred from Indiana. Forrester was granted a waiver for immediate eligibility. Had three years of remaining eligibility.
Tai Strickland	13	G	6'2"	180	Sophomore	Tampa, Florida	Transferred from Wisconsin. Under NCAA transfer rules, Strickland had to sit out the 2019–20 season. Had three years of remaining eligibility.

=== 2019 recruiting class ===
College recruiting
Name	Hometown	School	Height	Weight	Commit date
Joshua Pierre-Louis #16 PG	Plainfield, New Jersey	Roselle Catholic High School	6 ft 3 in (1.91 m)	180 lb (82 kg)	Mar 29, 2019
Joshua Pierre-Louis #16 PG	Recruit ratings: Scout: Rivals: 247Sports: (80)				
Damian Dunn #87 SG	Kinston, North Carolina	Meadowcreek High School	6 ft 4 in (1.93 m)	165 lb (75 kg)	Oct 6, 2018
Damian Dunn #87 SG	Recruit ratings: Scout: Rivals: 247Sports: (NR)				
Overall recruit ranking:
Note: In many cases, Scout, Rivals, 247Sports, On3, and ESPN may conflict in their listings of height and weight.; In these cases, the average was taken. ESPN grades are on a 100-point scale.; Sources: "2019 Team Ranking". Rivals.

== Preseason ==
In the preseason, Temple was picked to finish seventh in the American Athletic Conference by the league coaches. Senior guard Quinton Rose was picked to the preseason First Team All-AAC while junior guard Nate Pierre-Louis was picked to the preseason Second Team All-AAC.

== Roster ==
2019–20 Temple Owls men's basketball team
Players
Coaches

Pos.	#	Name	Height	Weight	Year	Previous school	Hometown
G	0	Alani Moore II	5 ft 10 in (1.78 m)	170 lb (77 kg)	Sr	Friendship Collegiate Academy	Washington, D.C.
G	1	Quinton Rose	6 ft 8 in (2.03 m)	185 lb (84 kg)	Sr	Bishop Kearney High School	Rochester, New York
G	2	Monty Scott	6 ft 5 in (1.96 m)	185 lb (84 kg)	RS Jr	St. Benedict’s Prep; Kennesaw State	Union, New Jersey
G	3	Josh Pierre-Louis	6 ft 3 in (1.91 m)	180 lb (82 kg)	Fr	Roselle Catholic High School	Plainfield, New Jersey
F	4	J. P. Moorman	6 ft 7 in (2.01 m)	205 lb (93 kg)	Jr	Greensboro Day School	Greensboro, North Carolina
F	10	Jake Forrester	6 ft 8 in (2.03 m)	218 lb (99 kg)	So	Westtown School; Indiana	Harrisburg, Pennsylvania
G	11	Damian Dunn (injured) (redshirt)	6 ft 4 in (1.93 m)	165 lb (75 kg)	Fr	Meadowcreek High School	Kinston, North Carolina
G	13	Tai Strickland (redshirt)	6 ft 2 in (1.88 m)	172 lb (78 kg)	So	St. Petersburg High School; Wisconsin	Tampa, Florida
F	14	Arashma Parks	6 ft 9 in (2.06 m)	235 lb (107 kg)	RS Fr	The Phelps School	North Royalton, Ohio
G	15	Nate Pierre-Louis	6 ft 4 in (1.93 m)	170 lb (77 kg)	Jr	Roselle Catholic High School	Plainfield, New Jersey
F	21	Justyn Hamilton	6 ft 10 in (2.08 m)	190 lb (86 kg)	Jr	Independence High School	Charlotte, North Carolina
F	22	De'Vondre Perry	6 ft 7 in (2.01 m)	220 lb (100 kg)	Jr	Baltimore Polytechnic	Baltimore, Maryland
F	25	Tim Waddington (W)	6 ft 5 in (1.96 m)	195 lb (88 kg)	Sr	Central Bucks High School South	Warrington, Pennsylvania
G	31	Jasen West (W)	6 ft 1 in (1.85 m)	170 lb (77 kg)	So	Lake Highland Prep	Orlando, Florida
G	32	Anto Keshgegian (W)	6 ft 3 in (1.91 m)	185 lb (84 kg)	Sr	St. Joseph's Prep; Eastern	Media, Pennsylvania
C	44	Damien Moore	6 ft 11 in (2.11 m)	225 lb (102 kg)	Sr	Callaway High School	Vaughn, Mississippi

Head coach

- Aaron McKie (Temple)

Assistant coach(es)

- Monté Ross (Winston Salem State)
- Chris Clark (Temple)
- Shawn Trice (Penn)

Legend

- (C) Team captain
- (S) Suspended
- (I) Ineligible
- (W) Walk-on
- Injured
- Current redshirt

Roster

- Preseason - Damian Dunn suffered a foot injury. He would appear in only one game during the season due to the injury.

== Schedule and results ==
Date time, TV	Rank^{#}	Opponent^{#}	Result	Record	High points	High rebounds	High assists	Site (attendance) city, state
Regular season
November 5, 2019; 8:00 pm, ESPN3		Drexel; City 6	W 70–62	1–0	16 – N. Pierre-Louis	10 – N. Pierre-Louis	5 – Moore II	Liacouras Center (7,025); Philadelphia, PA
November 9, 2019*; 2:00 pm, ESPN3		Morgan State	W 75–57	2–0	19 – N. Pierre-Louis	11 – N. Pierre-Louis	5 – N. Pierre-Louis	Liacouras Center (5,889); Philadelphia, PA
November 16, 2019*; 2:00 pm, ESPN+		at La Salle; Philadelphia Big 5	W 70–65	3–0	21 – N. Pierre-Louis	12 – N. Pierre-Louis	6 – Moorman II	Tom Gola Arena (2,941); Philadelphia, PA
November 22, 2019*; 11:00 pm, P12N		at USC; Orlando Invitational campus game	W 70–61	4–0	15 – J. Pierre-Louis	10 – N. Pierre-Louis	5 – Rose	Galen Center (3,625); Los Angeles, CA
November 28, 2019*; 11:00 am, ESPN2		vs. No. 5 Maryland; Orlando Invitational quarterfinals	L 69–76	4–1	22 – Moore II	9 – Moorman II	4 – Rose	HP Field House; Orlando, FL
November 29, 2019*; 2:00 pm, ESPNews		vs. Texas A&M; Orlando Invitational consolation 2nd round	W 65–42	5–1	19 – Rose	7 – N. Pierre-Louis	4 – Rose	HP Field House (2,014); Orlando, FL
December 1, 2019; 4:00 pm, ESPN2		vs. Davidson; Orlando Invitational - 5th Place Game	W 66–53	6–1	15 – N. Pierre-Louis	11 – Rose	9 – Rose	HP Field House; Orlando, FL
December 7, 2019*; 7:30 pm, ESPNU		Missouri	L 54–64	6–2	16 – Rose	9 – N. Pierre-Louis	5 – N. Pierre-Louis	Liacouras Center (6,405); Philadelphia, PA
December 10, 2019*; 7:00 pm, ESPNU		Saint Joseph's; Philadelphia Big 5/Rivalry	W 108–61	7–2	17 – Forrester	6 – Forrester	6 – Rose	Liacouras Center (6,197); Philadelphia, PA
December 17, 2019*; 9:30 pm, ESPNU		vs. Miami (FL); Basketball Hall of Fame Invitational	L 77–78	7–3	18 – Perry	14 – N. Pierre-Louis	6 – N. Pierre-Louis	Barclays Center (5,064); Brooklyn, NY
December 21, 2019*; 1:00 pm, ESPN3		Rider	W 78–66	8–3	15 – Moore II	8 – N. Pierre-Louis	9 – Rose	Liacouras Center (5,131); Philadelphia, PA
December 31, 2019; 2:00 pm, ESPNU		at UCF	W 62–58	9–3 (1–0)	16 – Rose	11 – N. Pierre-Louis	4 – N. Pierre-Louis	Addition Financial Arena (4,098); Orlando, FL
January 3, 2020; 9:00 pm, ESPNU		at Tulsa	L 44–70	9–4 (1–1)	12 – Rose	6 – Tied	4 – Rose	Reynolds Center (3,405); Tulsa, OK
January 7, 2020; 7:00 pm, CBSSN		Houston	L 74–78	9–5 (1–2)	21 – Rose	7 – N. Pierre-Louis	3 – Rose	Liacouras Center (4,366); Philadelphia, PA
January 11, 2020; 12:00 pm, ESPNU		Tulane	L 51–65	9–6 (1–3)	12 – Rose	11 – N. Pierre-Louis	4 – N. Pierre-Louis	Liacouras Center (6,485); Philadelphia, PA
January 15, 2020; 9:00 pm, ESPNU		No. 16 Wichita State	W 65–53	10–6 (2–3)	19 – Rose	12 – N. Pierre-Louis	3 – Rose	Liacouras Center (5,390); Philadelphia, PA
January 18, 2020; 8:00 pm, ESPNU		at SMU	L 52–68	10–7 (2–4)	14 – Forrester	7 – Forrester	4 – Moore II	Moody Coliseum (4,726); Dallas, TX
January 22, 2020; 7:00 pm, ESPNews		Cincinnati	L 82–89	10–8 (2–5)	26 – Rose	7 – Moorman	3 – Rose	Liacouras Center (6,463); Philadelphia, PA
January 25, 2020*; 2:00 pm, ESPN+		at Penn; Philadelphia Big 5	L 59–66	10–9	21 – Rose	11 – Forrester	1 – Tied	Palestra (6,524); Philadelphia, PA
January 29, 2020; 7:00 pm, ESPNews		at Connecticut	L 63–78	10–10 (2–6)	20 – N. Pierre-Louis	8 – Moorman II	5 – Rose	Harry A. Gampel Pavilion (7,886); Storrs, CT
February 1, 2020; 6:00 pm, CBSSN		East Carolina	W 76–64	11–10 (3–6)	20 – Rose	10 – Moorman II	5 – N. Pierre-Louis	Liacouras Center (6,877); Philadelphia, PA
February 5, 2020; 8:00 pm, CBSSN		at Memphis	L 65–79	11–11 (3–7)	13 – Tied	8 – Pierre-Louis	6 – Rose	FedExForum (15,685); Memphis, TN
February 8, 2020; 12:00 pm, ESPNU		SMU	W 97–90 ^{OT}	12–11 (4–7)	25 – Rose	7 – Mike	10 – Davis	Liacouras Center (7,615); Philadelphia, PA
February 12, 2020; 8:00 pm, ESPN3		at Tulane	W 72–68	13–11 (5–7)	23 – Rose	13 – N. Pierre-Louis	6 – Moore II	Devlin Fieldhouse (1,330); New Orleans, LA
February 16, 2020*; 1:00 pm, ESPN		No. 15 Villanova; Philadelphia Big 5	L 56–76	13–12	22 – Rose	11 – N. Pierre-Louis	3 – Rose	Liacouras Center (10,206); Philadelphia, PA
February 20, 2020; 7:00 pm, ESPN2		Connecticut	W 93–89 ^{2OT}	14–12 (6–7)	25 – Scott	14 – N. Pierre-Louis	5 – N. Pierre-Louis	Liacouras Center (6,604); Philadelphia, PA
February 23, 2020; 12:00 pm, ESPNU		at East Carolina	L 63–67	14–13 (6–8)	15 – Rose	8 – Morman II	4 – Scott	Williams Arena (3,695); Greenville, NC
February 27, 2020; 8:00 pm, ESPN		at Wichita State	L 69–72	14–14 (6–9)	20 – Rose	6 – N. Pierre-Louis	2 – Tied	Charles Koch Arena (10,112); Wichita, KS
March 1, 2020; 12:00 pm, CBSSN		South Florida	L 58–64	14–15 (6–10)	13 – Rose	12 – N. Pierre-Louis	7 – N. Pierre-Louis	Liacouras Center (6,656); Philadelphia, PA
March 4, 2020; 7:00 pm, ESPN3		Tulsa	L 51–61	14–16 (6–11)	15 – Rose	12 – N. Pierre-Louis	4 – Rose	Liacouras Center (5,068); Philadelphia, PA
March 7, 2020; 8:00 pm, CBSSN		at Cincinnati	L 63–64	14–17 (6–12)	19 – Rose	8 – Moorman II	3 – Tied	Fifth Third Arena (12,365); Cincinnati, OH
AAC tournament
March 12, 2020; 8:00 pm, ESPNU	(10)	vs. (7) SMU; First Round	Cancelled					Dickies Arena; Fort Worth, TX
*Non-conference game. ^{#}Rankings from AP Poll. (#) Tournament seedings in parentheses. All times are in Eastern Time.

1.Cancelled due to the Coronavirus Pandemic

== Awards and honors ==
=== American Athletic Conference honors ===
==== All-AAC Second Team ====
- Quinton Rose

==== Player of the Week ====
- Week 1: Nate Pierre-Louis
- Week 4: Quinton Rose
