= 2019–20 Tulsa Golden Hurricane men's basketball team =

University of Tulsa NCAA team

2019–20 Tulsa Golden Hurricane men's basketball

AAC regular season co-champions
- Conference: American Athletic Conference
- Record: 21–10 (13–5 AAC)
- Head coach: Frank Haith (6th season)
- Assistant coaches: Jerry Wainwright; Kwanza Johnson; Shea Seals
- Home arena: Reynolds Center

2019–20 American Athletic Conference men's basketball standings
| | Conf. | | | | Overall |
| Team | W | | L | PCT | W | | L | PCT |
|---|---|---|---|---|---|---|---|---|
| Cincinnati | 13 | – | 5 | .722 | 20 | – | 10 | .667 |
| No. 22 Houston | 13 | – | 5 | .722 | 23 | – | 8 | .742 |
| Tulsa | 13 | – | 5 | .722 | 21 | – | 10 | .677 |
| Wichita State | 11 | – | 7 | .611 | 23 | – | 8 | .742 |
| UConn | 10 | – | 8 | .556 | 19 | – | 12 | .613 |
| Memphis | 10 | – | 8 | .556 | 21 | – | 10 | .677 |
| SMU | 9 | – | 9 | .500 | 19 | – | 11 | .633 |
| UCF | 7 | – | 11 | .389 | 16 | – | 14 | .533 |
| South Florida | 7 | – | 11 | .389 | 14 | – | 17 | .452 |
| Temple | 6 | – | 12 | .333 | 14 | – | 17 | .452 |
| East Carolina | 5 | – | 13 | .278 | 11 | – | 20 | .355 |
| Tulane | 4 | – | 14 | .222 | 12 | – | 18 | .400 |
Note: The 2020 AAC tournament was canceled due to the COVID-19 pandemic. Rankings from AP poll

The 2019–20 Tulsa Golden Hurricane men's basketball team represented the University of Tulsa during the 2019–20 NCAA Division I men's basketball season. The Golden Hurricane, led by sixth-year head coach Frank Haith, played their home games at the Reynolds Center in Tulsa, Oklahoma as members of the American Athletic Conference. They finished the season 21–10, 13–5 in AAC play to finish in a three-way tie for first place. Frank Haith was named AAC Coach of the Year for the season. Due to tiebreaking rules, they received the No. 3 seed in the AAC tournament, which was canceled due to the ongoing coronavirus pandemic. Shortly thereafter, the NCAA Tournament and all postseason tournaments were canceled, effectively ending Tulsa's season.

== Previous season ==
The Golden Hurricane finished the 2018–19 season 18–14, 8–10 in AAC play to finish in a tie for seventh place. They lost in the first round of the AAC tournament to SMU.

== Offseason ==
=== Departures ===
| Name | Number | Pos. | Height | Weight | Year | Hometown | Reason for departure |
|---|---|---|---|---|---|---|---|
| Chris Barnes | 0 | G | 6'4" | 200 | RS sophomore | Compton, CA | Transferred to Eastern Michigan |
| DaQuan Jeffries | 2 | G/F | 6'5" | 230 | Senior | Edmond, OK | Graduated |
| Sterling Taplin | 4 | G | 6'1" | 195 | Senior | Williamsville, NY | Graduated |
| Curran Scott | 10 | G | 6'4' | 208 | RS junior | Edmond, OK | Graduate transferred to Clemson |
| Lindsay Deline Jr. | 14 | G | 5'11" | 189 | Senior | Midwest City, OK | Walk-on; graduated |
| Zeke Moore | 23 | G | 6'7" | 210 | RS sophomore | St. Louis, MO | Mid-season transferred to SIU Edwardsville |
| Pete Hewitt | 32 | F | 6'10" | 225 | RS sophomore | Mountain View, CA | Transferred to Point Loma Nazarene |
| Alex Foree | 34 | F | 6'5" | 214 | Senior | Fort Smith, AR | Walk-on; graduated |
| Simon Falokun | 44 | F | 6'8" | 240 | Sophomore | Houston, TX | Left team |

=== Incoming transfers ===
| Name | Number | Pos. | Height | Weight | Year | Hometown | Previous school |
|---|---|---|---|---|---|---|---|
| Brandon Rachal | 0 | G | 6'6" | 220 | Junior | Natchitoches, LA | Junior college transferred from Pearl River CC |
| Keyshawn Embery | 2 | G | 6'3" | 202 | Sophomore | Midwest City, OK | Transferred from Arkansas. Under NCAA transfer rules, Embery will have to sit out the 2019–20 season. Will have three years of remaining eligibility. |
| Emmanuel Ugboh | 24 | C | 6'11" | 242 | Junior | Lagos, Nigeria | Junior college transferred from Iowa Western CC |
| Curtis Haywood | 33 | G | 6'5" | 202 | Junior | Oklahoma City, OK | Transferred from Georgia Tech. Under NCAA transfer rules, Haywood will have to sit out the 2019–20 season. Will have two years of remaining eligibility. |

=== 2019 recruiting class ===
College recruiting information
| Name | Hometown | School | Height | Weight | Commit date |
|---|---|---|---|---|---|
| Isaiah Hill; PG | Bakersfield, CA | Liberty High School | 5 ft 11 in (1.80 m) | 160 lb (73 kg) | Aug 27, 2018 |
| Isaiah Hill; PG | Recruit ratings: Scout: Rivals: 247Sports: ESPN: (NR) | | | | |
| Josh Earley; PF | Shawnee Mission, KS | Bishop Miege High School | 6 ft 8 in (2.03 m) | 160 lb (73 kg) | Apr 28, 2019 |
| Josh Earley; PF | Recruit ratings: Scout: Rivals: 247Sports: ESPN: (NR) | | | | |
Overall recruit ranking:
Note: In many cases, Scout, Rivals, 247Sports, On3, and ESPN may conflict in their listings of height and weight.; In these cases, the average was taken. ESPN grades are on a 100-point scale.; Sources: "Tulsa 2019 Basketball Commitments". Rivals.; "2019 Team Ranking". Rivals.

=== 2020 recruiting class ===
College recruiting information (2020)
| Name | Hometown | School | Height | Weight | Commit date |
|---|---|---|---|---|---|
| Keshawn Williams; PG | Chicago Heights, Illinois | Bloom High School | 6 ft 2 in (1.88 m) | 165 lb (75 kg) | Oct 22, 2019 |
| Keshawn Williams; PG | Recruit ratings: Scout: Rivals: 247Sports: ESPN: (NR) | | | | |
| Peyton Urbancic; SG | Naples, Florida | First Baptist Academy | 6 ft 6 in (1.98 m) | 180 lb (82 kg) | Feb 27, 2020 |
| Peyton Urbancic; SG | Recruit ratings: Scout: Rivals: 247Sports: ESPN: (NR) | | | | |
Overall recruit ranking:
Note: In many cases, Scout, Rivals, 247Sports, On3, and ESPN may conflict in their listings of height and weight.; In these cases, the average was taken. ESPN grades are on a 100-point scale.; Sources: "Tulsa 2020 Basketball Commitments". Rivals.; "2020 Team Ranking". Rivals.

== Roster ==
2019–20 Tulsa Golden Hurricane men's basketball team
Players
Coaches

| Pos. | # | Name | Height | Weight | Year | Previous school | Hometown |
|---|---|---|---|---|---|---|---|
| G | 0 | Brandon Rachal | 6 ft 6 in (1.98 m) | 220 lb (100 kg) | Jr | Natchitoches Central HS; LSU; Pearl River CC | Natchitoches, LA |
| F | 1 | Martins Igbanu | 6 ft 8 in (2.03 m) | 235 lb (107 kg) | Sr | Covenant Christian Ministries Academy | Lagos, Nigeria |
| G | 2 | Keyshawn Embery-Simpson (redshirt) | 6 ft 3 in (1.91 m) | 200 lb (91 kg) | So | Midwest City HS; Arkansas | Midwest City, OK |
| G | 3 | Elijah Joiner | 6 ft 3 in (1.91 m) | 200 lb (91 kg) | Jr | Curie Metropolitan HS | Chicago, IL |
| G | 4 | Isaiah Hill | 6 ft 0 in (1.83 m) | 165 lb (75 kg) | Fr | Liberty HS | Bakersfield, CA |
| G | 5 | Lawson Korita | 6 ft 5 in (1.96 m) | 205 lb (93 kg) | Sr | Pulaski Academy | Little Rock, AR |
| G | 11 | Darien Jackson | 6 ft 3 in (1.91 m) | 189 lb (86 kg) | Jr | Blue Valley Northwest HS | Overland Park, KS |
| C | 12 | Emmanuel Ugboh | 7 ft 0 in (2.13 m) | 245 lb (111 kg) | Jr | Quality Education Academy; Iowa Western CC | Lagos, Nigeria |
| G | 13 | George Christopoulos (W) | 6 ft 0 in (1.83 m) | 167 lb (76 kg) | RS Fr | Warner Christian Academy | Nea Smyrni, Greece |
| F | 15 | Josh Earley | 6 ft 7 in (2.01 m) | 210 lb (95 kg) | Fr | Bishop Miege HS | Shawnee Mission, KS |
| G | 22 | Reggie Jones | 6 ft 6 in (1.98 m) | 210 lb (95 kg) | RS Jr | Marion HS; Western Michigan | Marion, IN |
| G | 23 | Ryan Gendron (W) (redshirt) | 6 ft 4 in (1.93 m) | 200 lb (91 kg) | Fr | Bishop Kelley HS; Oklahoma State | Tulsa, OK |
| G | 33 | Curtis Haywood (redshirt) | 6 ft 5 in (1.96 m) | 200 lb (91 kg) | Jr | Brewster Academy; Georgia Tech | Oklahoma City, OK |
| F | 41 | Jeriah Horne | 6 ft 7 in (2.01 m) | 222 lb (101 kg) | RS Jr | The Barstow School; Nebraska | Overland Park, KS |

Head coach

- Frank Haith (Elon)

Assistant coach(es)

- Jerry Wainwright (Colorado College)
- Kwanza Johnson (Tulsa)
- Shea Seals (Tulsa)

Legend

- (C) Team captain
- (S) Suspended
- (I) Ineligible
- (W) Walk-on
- (T) Transferred
- Injured
- Current redshirt

Roster

== Schedule and results ==
| Date time, TV | Rank^{#} | Opponent^{#} | Result | Record | Site (attendance) city, state |
Exhibition
| October 31, 2019*; 7:00 pm | | Rockurst | W 76–56 | | Reynolds Center; Tulsa, OK |
Non-conference regular season
| November 5, 2019*; 12:00 pm, ESPN3 | | Houston Baptist | W 80–72 | 1–0 | Reynolds Center (3,577); Tulsa, OK |
| November 9, 2019*; 7:00 pm, ESPN+ | | at UT Arlington | L 59–73 | 1–1 | College Park Center (3,722); Arlington, TX |
| November 12, 2019*; 7:00 pm, ESPN3 | | Oral Roberts; PSO Mayor's Cup | W 74–67 | 2–1 | Reynolds Center (3,705); Tulsa, OK |
| November 16, 2019*; 2:00 pm, ESPN3 | | Austin Peay; Vanderbilt Invitational | W 72–65 | 3–1 | Reynolds Center (3,105); Tulsa, OK |
| November 20, 2019*; 7:00 pm | | Southeastern Louisiana; Vanderbilt Invitational | W 73–66 | 4–1 | Reynolds Center (3,036); Tulsa, OK |
| November 27, 2019*; 1:00 pm, ESPN3 | | South Carolina State; Vanderbilt Invitational | W 78–47 | 5–1 | Reynolds Center (2,870); Tulsa, OK |
| November 30, 2019*; 7:00 pm, SECN+ | | at Vanderbilt; Vanderbilt Invitational | W 67–58 | 6–1 | Memorial Gymnasium (8,648); Nashville, TN |
| December 4, 2019*; 7:00 pm, ESPN3 | | Arkansas–Pine Bluff | W 72–39 | 7–1 | Reynolds Center (2,781); Tulsa, OK |
| December 7, 2019*; 2:00 pm, ESPN3 | | Arkansas State | L 63–66 | 7–2 | Reynolds Center (3,074); Tulsa, OK |
| December 11, 2019*; 7:00 pm, ESPN3 | | Boise State | W 69–56 | 8–2 | Reynolds Center (3,367); Tulsa, OK |
| December 14, 2019*; 12:30 pm, ESPNU | | at Arkansas | L 79–98 | 8–3 | Bud Walton Arena (15,589); Fayetteville, AR |
| December 21, 2019*; 1:30 pm, ESPN3 | | vs. Colorado State; BOK Center Basketball Showdown | L 104–111 ^{3OT} | 8–4 | BOK Center (2,422); Tulsa, OK |
| December 29, 2019*; 5:00 pm, ESPN+ | | at Kansas State | L 67–69 | 8–5 | Bramlage Coliseum (8,370); Manhattan, KS |
AAC regular season
| January 3, 2020; 8:00 pm, ESPNU | | Temple | W 70–44 | 9–5 (1–0) | Reynolds Center (3,405); Tulsa, OK |
| January 8, 2020; 6:00 pm, ESPNU | | at Cincinnati | L 44–75 | 9–6 (1–1) | Fifth Third Arena (10,138); Cincinnati, OH |
| January 11, 2020; 3:00 pm, ESPN2 | | Houston | W 63–61 | 10–6 (2–1) | Reynolds Center (3,725); Tulsa, OK |
| January 15, 2020; 6:00 pm, ESPN3 | | at East Carolina | W 65–49 | 11–6 (3–1) | Williams Arena (5,332); Greenville, NC |
| January 18, 2020; 1:00 pm, ESPN3 | | at Tulane | W 67–54 | 12–6 (4–1) | Devlin Fieldhouse (2,189); New Orleans, LA |
| January 22, 2020; 8:00 pm, ESPNU | | No. 20 Memphis | W 80–40 | 13–6 (5–1) | Reynolds Center (4,668); Tulsa, OK |
| January 26, 2020; 11:00 am, CBSSN | | at UConn | W 79–75 ^{OT} | 14–6 (6–1) | XL Center (10,509); Hartford, CT |
| February 1, 2020; 5:00 pm, ESPNU | | No. 23 Wichita State; Rivalry | W 54–51 | 15–6 (7–1) | Reynolds Center (8,089); Tulsa, OK |
| February 6, 2020; 6:00 pm, ESPN2 | | UConn | L 56–72 | 15–7 (7–2) | Reynolds Center (4,630); Tulsa, OK |
| February 9, 2020; 1:00 pm, ESPN3 | | at UCF | L 75–83 | 15–8 (7–3) | Addition Financial Arena (5,349); Orlando, FL |
| February 12, 2020; 7:00 pm, ESPN3 | | East Carolina | W 70–56 | 16–8 (8–3) | Reynolds Center (3,232); Tulsa, OK |
| February 15, 2020; 11:00 am, ESPNU | | at South Florida | W 56–48 | 17–8 (9–3) | Yuengling Center (3,095); Tampa, FL |
| February 19, 2020; 8:00 pm, ESPNU | | at No. 22 Houston | L 43–76 | 17–9 (9–4) | Fertitta Center (6,732); Houston, TX |
| February 22, 2020; 2:00 pm, ESPNews | | SMU | W 79–57 | 18–9 (10–4) | Reynolds Center (4,690); Tulsa, OK |
| February 25, 2020; 8:00 pm, ESPNU | | Tulane | W 62–57 | 19–9 (11–4) | Reynolds Center (3,443); Tulsa, OK |
| February 29, 2020; 5:00 pm, ESPNU | | UCF | W 65–54 | 20–9 (12–4) | Reynolds Center (5,304); Tulsa, OK |
| March 4, 2020; 6:00 pm, ESPN3 | | at Temple | W 61–51 | 21–9 (13–4) | Liacouras Center (5,068); Philadelphia, PA |
| March 8, 2020; 3:00 pm, CBSSN | | at Wichita State; Rivalry | L 57–79 | 21–10 (13–5) | Charles Koch Arena (10,506); Wichita, KS |
AAC tournament
| March 13, 2020; 8:30 pm, ESPNU | (3) | vs. (6) Memphis / (11) East Carolina; Quarterfinals | Cancelled | | Dickies Arena; Fort Worth, TX |
*Non-conference game. ^{#}Rankings from AP Poll. (#) Tournament seedings in parentheses. All times are in Central Time.

1. Cancelled due to the Coronavirus Pandemic

== Awards and honors ==
=== American Athletic Conference honors ===
- Coach of the Year: Frank Haith
- Sixth Man of the Year: Martins Igbanu

==== All-AAC First Team ====
- Martins Igbanu

==== All-AAC Third Team ====
- Brandon Rachal

==== Player of the Week ====
- Week 2: Brandon Rachal
- Week 11: Brandon Rachal
- Week 12: Martins Igbanu
- Week 13: Elijah Joiner
