= 2019–20 UCF Knights men's basketball team =

University of Central Florida NCAA team

2019–20 UCF Knights men's basketball
- Conference: American Athletic Conference
- Record: 16–14 (7–11 AAC)
- Head coach: Johnny Dawkins (4th season)
- Assistant coaches: Kevin Norris (4th season); Vince Taylor (3rd season); Robbie Laing (4th season)
- Home arena: Addition Financial Arena

2019–20 American Athletic Conference men's basketball standings
	Conf.				Overall
Team	W		L	PCT	W		L	PCT
Cincinnati	13	–	5	.722	20	–	10	.667
No. 22 Houston	13	–	5	.722	23	–	8	.742
Tulsa	13	–	5	.722	21	–	10	.677
Wichita State	11	–	7	.611	23	–	8	.742
UConn	10	–	8	.556	19	–	12	.613
Memphis	10	–	8	.556	21	–	10	.677
SMU	9	–	9	.500	19	–	11	.633
UCF	7	–	11	.389	16	–	14	.533
South Florida	7	–	11	.389	14	–	17	.452
Temple	6	–	12	.333	14	–	17	.452
East Carolina	5	–	13	.278	11	–	20	.355
Tulane	4	–	14	.222	12	–	18	.400
Note: The 2020 AAC tournament was canceled due to the COVID-19 pandemic. Rankings from AP poll

The 2019–20 UCF Knights men's basketball team represented the University of Central Florida during the 2019–20 NCAA Division I men's basketball season. The Knights were members of the American Athletic Conference. The Knights, in the program's 51st season of basketball, were led by fourth-year head coach Johnny Dawkins and played their home games at the Addition Financial Arena on the university's main campus in Orlando, Florida.

== Previous season ==
The Knights finished the 2018–19 season 24–9 overall and 13–5 in AAC play to finish in a tie for third place. In the AAC tournament, they lost to Memphis in the quarterfinals. They received an at-large bid to the NCAA tournament for the first time since 2005. They defeated VCU in the first round before losing Duke in the second round.

== Offseason ==
=== Departures ===
Name	Number	Pos.	Height	Weight	Year	Hometown	Reason for departure
B. J. Taylor	1	G	6'2"	200	RS senior	Orlando, FL	Graduated
Terrell Allen	2	G	6'2"	185	RS junior	Upper Marlboro, MD	Graduate transferred to Georgetown
Myles Douglas	5	F	6'8"	215	Sophomore	Edgewood, MD	Transferred to Saint Joseph's
Dayon Griffin	10	G	6'4"	208	RS senior	St. Petersburg, FL	Graduated
Rokas Ulvydas	11	F	6'11"	235	RS junior	Kaunas, Lithuania	Left team
Aubrey Dawkins	15	G/F	6'6"	205	RS junior	Palo Alto, CA	To play professionally
Chad Brown	21	F	6'9"	240	Senior	Deltona, FL	Graduated
Chance McSpadden	22	G	6'4'	184	RS junior	Winter Haven, FL	Graduate transferred to Stetson
Tacko Fall	24	C	7'6"	295	Senior	Dakar, Senegal	Graduated
Anthony Catotti	31	G	6'4"	200	RS senior	Oviedo, FL	Walk-on; graduated

=== Incoming transfers ===
Name	Number	Pos.	Height	Weight	Year	Hometown	Previous school
Yuat Alok	0	F	6'11"	225	RS junior	Auckland, New Zealand	Transferred from TCU in January during the 2018–19 season. Under NCAA transfer rules, Alok had to sit out until January, and was eligible to start in January during the 2019–20 season. Alok had one and a half years of remaining eligibility.
Matt Milon	3	G	6'5"	195	Graduate student	Oviedo, FL	Transferred from William & Mary. Was eligible to play immediately, since he graduated from William & Mary.
Avery Diggs	5	C	6'10"	240	Junior	Brandon, FL	Junior college transferred from Southwest Mississippi CC
Dazon Ingram	12	G	6'5"	207	Graduate student	Theodore, AL	Transferred from Alabama. Was eligible to play immediately, since he graduated from Alabama.
Brandon Mahan	13	G	6'5"	200	Junior	Birmingham, AL	Transferred from Texas A&M. Mahan was granted a waiver for immediate eligibility. Had two years of remaining eligibility.
Sean Mobley	30	F	6'9"	225	Junior	Melbourne, FL	Transferred from VCU. Under NCAA transfer rules, Mobley had to sit out the 2019–20 season. Had two years of remaining eligibility.
Moses Bol	35	C	7'1'	230	Junior	Wau, South Sudan	Junior college transferred from Colby CC

=== 2019 recruiting class ===
College recruiting
Name	Hometown	School	Height	Weight	Commit date
Tony Johnson; PG	Eufaula, AL	The Skill Factory Prep School	6 ft 2 in (1.88 m)	200 lb (91 kg)	Feb 16, 2019
Tony Johnson; PG	Recruit ratings: Scout: Rivals: (78)				
Darin Green Jr. SG	Tampa, FL	Wharton High School	6 ft 5 in (1.96 m)	175 lb (79 kg)	Jul 23, 2018
Darin Green Jr. SG	Recruit ratings: Scout: Rivals: (NR)				
Overall recruit ranking:
Note: In many cases, Scout, Rivals, 247Sports, On3, and ESPN may conflict in their listings of height and weight.; In these cases, the average was taken. ESPN grades are on a 100-point scale.; Sources: "2019 Team Ranking". Rivals.

=== 2020 recruiting class ===
College recruiting (2020)
Name	Hometown	School	Height	Weight	Commit date
Isaiah Adams; SF	Jacksonville, FL	Paxon School For Advanced Studies	6 ft 2 in (1.88 m)	170 lb (77 kg)	Sep 2, 2019
Isaiah Adams; SF	Recruit ratings: Scout: Rivals: (80)				
Jamille Reynolds; C	Saint Petersburg, FL	Lakewood Senior High School	6 ft 9 in (2.06 m)	240 lb (110 kg)	Aug 18, 2019
Jamille Reynolds; C	Recruit ratings: Scout: Rivals: (80)				
Overall recruit ranking:
Note: In many cases, Scout, Rivals, 247Sports, On3, and ESPN may conflict in their listings of height and weight.; In these cases, the average was taken. ESPN grades are on a 100-point scale.; Sources: "2020 Team Ranking". Rivals.

== Roster ==
2019–20 UCF Knights men's basketball team
Players
Coaches

Pos.	#	Name	Height	Weight	Year	Previous school	Hometown
F	0	Yuat Alok (T) (redshirt)	6 ft 11 in (2.11 m)	225 lb (102 kg)	Jr	TCU	Auckland, New Zealand
G	1	Tony Johnson Jr.	6 ft 3 in (1.91 m)	185 lb (84 kg)	Fr	The Skill Factory	Eufaula, Alabama
G	2	Matt Milon	6 ft 5 in (1.96 m)	210 lb (95 kg)	GS	William & Mary	Oviedo, Florida
G	3	Dre Fuller Jr.	6 ft 5 in (1.96 m)	210 lb (95 kg)	RS Fr	Admiral Farragut Academy	Fayetteville, North Carolina
G	4	Ceasar DeJesus	6 ft 2 in (1.88 m)	190 lb (86 kg)	RS Jr	Mt. Zion Prep	Jersey City, New Jersey
C	5	Avery Diggs	6 ft 11 in (2.11 m)	250 lb (113 kg)	Jr	SW Mississippi CC	Brandon, Florida
G	10	Levy Renaud (W)	6 ft 2 in (1.88 m)	180 lb (82 kg)	So	NSU University School	Fort Lauderdale, Florida
G	11	Xavier Grant (W)	6 ft 3 in (1.91 m)	180 lb (82 kg)	So	American Heritage School	Fort Lauderdale, Florida
G	12	Dazon Ingram	6 ft 6 in (1.98 m)	205 lb (93 kg)	GS	Alabama	Theodore, Alabama
G	13	Brandon Mahan	6 ft 5 in (1.96 m)	200 lb (91 kg)	Jr	Texas A&M	Birmingham, Alabama
F	14	Ibrahim Famouke Doumbia	6 ft 7 in (2.01 m)	205 lb (93 kg)	RS So	South Carolina	Bamako, Mali
G	20	Frank Bertz	6 ft 5 in (1.96 m)	180 lb (82 kg)	Sr	East Los Angeles College	Hesperia, California
G	22	Darin Green Jr.	6 ft 4 in (1.93 m)	180 lb (82 kg)	Fr	Wharton High School	Charlotte, North Carolina
F	25	Ryan Anders (W)	6 ft 6 in (1.98 m)	220 lb (100 kg)	So	Wharton High School	Tampa, Florida
F	30	Sean Mobley (redshirt)	6 ft 8 in (2.03 m)	225 lb (102 kg)	Jr	VCU	Melbourne, Florida
C	33	Moses Bol (redshirt)	7 ft 1 in (2.16 m)	225 lb (102 kg)	Jr	Colby CC	Wau, South Sudan
C	35	Collin Smith	6 ft 11 in (2.11 m)	240 lb (109 kg)	RS Jr	George Washington	Jacksonville, Florida

Head coach

- Johnny Dawkins (Duke)

Assistant coach(es)

- Kevin Norris (Miami (FL))
- Vince Taylor (Duke)
- Robbie Laing (Troy)

Legend

- (C) Team captain
- (S) Suspended
- (I) Ineligible
- (W) Walk-on
- (T) Transferred
- Injured
- Current redshirt

Roster

- Jan. 13, 2020 - Yuat Alok elected to transfer to Southern Utah after the fall semester. Alok did not play in a single game for the Knights.

== Schedule and results ==
Date time, TV	Rank^{#}	Opponent^{#}	Result	Record	Site (attendance) city, state
Non-conference regular season
November 9, 2019*; 7:00 pm, ESPN3		Prairie View A&M	W 73–69	1–0	Addition Financial Arena (4,972); Orlando, FL
November 12, 2019*; 9:00 pm, CBSSN		Miami (FL)	L 70–79	1–1	Addition Financial Arena (7,514); Orlando, FL
November 17, 2019*; 2:00 pm, ESPN3		at Illinois State	W 67–65	2–1	Redbird Arena (4,372); Normal, IL
November 23, 2019*; 2:00 pm, ESPN3		College of Charleston; Wooden Legacy campus-site game	W 72–71	3–1	Addition Financial Arena (4,578); Orlando, FL
November 28, 2019*; 8:30 pm, ESPNU		vs. Penn; Wooden Legacy quarterfinals	L 67–68	3–2	Anaheim Arena (1,574); Anaheim, CA
November 29, 2019*; 9:00 pm, ESPNews		vs. Pepperdine; Wooden Legacy consolation 2nd round	W 78–65	4–2	Anaheim Arena; Anaheim, CA
December 1, 2019*; 4:00 pm, ESPNU		vs. Charleston; Wooden Legacy 5th place game	W 77–56	5–2	Anaheim Arena; Anaheim, CA
December 7, 2019*; 12:00 pm, ESPN3		NJIT	W 78–65	6–2	Addition Financial Arena (4,178); Orlando, FL
December 10, 2019*; 8:00 pm, ESPN3		Green Bay	W 79–66	7–2	Addition Financial Arena (4,370); Orlando, FL
December 15, 2019*; 2:00 pm, ESPN3		Sacred Heart	W 76–65	8–2	Addition Financial Arena (3,994); Orlando, FL
December 18, 2019*; 7:00 pm, ESPN3		Bethune–Cookman	W 70–65	9–2	Addition Financial Arena (4,112); Orlando, FL
December 21, 2019*; 2:00 pm, FSOK		at Oklahoma	L 52–53	9–3	Lloyd Noble Center (6,875); Norman, OK
AAC regular season
December 31, 2019; 2:00 pm, ESPNU		Temple	L 58–62	9–4 (0–1)	Addition Financial Arena (4,098); Orlando, FL
January 3, 2020; 7:00 pm, ESPN2		at Houston	L 63–78	9–5 (0–2)	Fertitta Center (7,035); Houston, TX
January 8, 2020; 8:00 pm, ESPN3		at SMU	L 74–81	9–6 (0–3)	Moody Coliseum (4,011); Dallas, TX
January 11, 2020; 12:00 pm, ESPN2		Cincinnati	L 54–68	9–7 (0–4)	Addition Financial Arena (5,482); Orlando, FL
January 14, 2020; 8:00 pm, ESPN3		at Tulane	W 74–55	10–7 (1–4)	Devlin Fieldhouse (1,665); New Orleans, LA
January 18, 2020; 6:00 pm, ESPNU		South Florida; War on I-4	W 55–54	11–7 (2–4)	Addition Financial Arena (6,433); Orlando, FL
January 25, 2020; 8:00 pm, ESPNU		at Wichita State	L 79–87	11–8 (2–5)	Charles Koch Arena (10,398); Wichita, KS
January 29, 2020; 7:00 pm, ESPNU		Memphis	L 57–59	11–9 (2–6)	Addition Financial Arena (5,774); Orlando, FL
February 1, 2020; 4:00 pm, ESPNU		at South Florida; War on I-4	L 48–64	11–10 (2–7)	Yuengling Center (6,254); Tampa, FL
February 6, 2020; 7:00 pm, ESPNU		at East Carolina	W 68–64	12–10 (3–7)	Williams Arena (3,474); Greenville, NC
February 9, 2020; 2:00 pm, ESPN3		Tulsa	W 83–75	13–10 (4–7)	Addition Financial Arena (5,349); Orlando, FL
February 13, 2020; 7:00 pm, ESPN2		Wichita State	L 58–75	13–11 (4–8)	Addition Financial Arena (5,553); Orlando, FL
February 19, 2020; 7:00 pm, ESPNU		at Cincinnati	W 89–87 ^{2OT}	14–11 (5–8)	Fifth Third Arena (10,874); Cincinnati, OH
February 22, 2020; 12:00 pm, ESPNU		Tulane	L 74–75	14–12 (5–9)	Addition Financial Arena (4,966); Orlando, FL
February 26, 2020; 7:00 pm, ESPNU		at Connecticut	L 65–81	14–13 (5–10)	XL Center (9,480); Hartford, CT
February 29, 2020; 6:00 pm, ESPNU		at Tulsa	L 54–65	14–14 (5–11)	Reynolds Center (5,304); Tulsa, OK
March 4, 2020; 7:00 pm, ESPN3		SMU	W 61–58	15–14 (6–11)	Addition Financial Arena (4,591); Orlando, FL
March 8, 2020; 2:00 pm, ESPNU		East Carolina	W 94–62	16–14 (7–11)	Addition Financial Arena (4,819); Orlando, FL
American Athletic Conference tournament
March 12, 2020; 1:00 pm, ESPNU	(8)	vs. (9) South Florida; First Round	Cancelled		Dickies Arena; Fort Worth, TX
*Non-conference game. ^{#}Rankings from AP Poll. (#) Tournament seedings in parentheses. All times are in Eastern Time.

1.Cancelled due to the Coronavirus pandemic

== Awards and honors ==
=== American Athletic Conference honors ===
==== Rookie of the Week ====
- Week 14: Darin Green Jr.
