= American Conference men's basketball tournament =

Annual college basketball tournament

- Conference basketball championship
- Sport: College basketball
- Conference: American Conference
- Number of teams: 14
- Format: Single-elimination
- Current stadium: Legacy Arena
- Current location: Birmingham, AL
- Played: 2014–present
- Last contest: 2025 AAC tournament
- Current champion: South Florida (USF)
- Most championships: Cincinnati, Houston, SMU, Memphis (2)
- TV partner(s): CBS; ESPN / ESPN2 / ESPNU / ESPNews
- Official website: theamerican.org/mbball

The American Conference men's basketball tournament (sometimes known simply as The American Championship) is the conference tournament in men's basketball for the American Conference. It is a single-elimination tournament that involves all league schools (14 as of the 2023–24 season). Its seeding is based on regular season records. The winner receives the conference's automatic bid to the NCAA men's basketball tournament; however, the official conference championship is awarded to the team or teams with the best regular season record.

The creation of the conference tournament was a product of the split of the original Big East Conference. While the American is the legal successor to the old Big East, it gave up the rights to the long-standing conference tournament at Madison Square Garden in New York City to the new Big East. As a result, the 2014 tournament was numbered as the first tournament for the conference.

The conference adopted the "American Athletic Conference" name upon the Big East split, dropping the word "Athletic" in July 2025.

== Champions ==
Year	Champion	Score	Runner-up	MVP	Venue
2014	Louisville†	71–61	Connecticut	Russ Smith, Louisville	FedEx Forum (Memphis, TN)
2015	SMU	62–54	Connecticut	Markus Kennedy, SMU	XL Center (Hartford, CT)
2016	Connecticut	72–58	Memphis	Daniel Hamilton, Connecticut	Amway Center (Orlando, FL)
2017	SMU	71–56	Cincinnati	Semi Ojeleye, SMU	XL Center (Hartford, CT)
2018	Cincinnati	56–55	Houston	Gary Clark, Cincinnati	Amway Center (Orlando, FL)
2019	Cincinnati	69–57	Houston	Jarron Cumberland, Cincinnati	FedEx Forum (Memphis, TN)
2020	Canceled due to the COVID-19 pandemic				
2021	Houston	91–54	Cincinnati	Quentin Grimes, Houston	Dickies Arena (Fort Worth, TX)
2022	Houston	71–53	Memphis	Fabian White Jr., Houston	Dickies Arena (Fort Worth, TX)
2023	Memphis	75–65	Houston	Kendric Davis, Memphis	Dickies Arena (Fort Worth, TX)
2024	UAB	85–69	Temple	Yaxel Lendeborg, UAB	Dickies Arena (Fort Worth, TX)
2025	Memphis	84–72	UAB	PJ Haggerty, Memphis	Dickies Arena (Fort Worth, TX)
2026	South Florida	70–55	Wichita State	Wes Enis, South Florida	Legacy Arena (Birmingham, AL)
2027	–	–	–	–	Yuengling Center (Tampa, FL)
2028	–	–	–	–	Yuengling Center (Tampa, FL)

† Louisville was forced to vacate their 2014 win due to 2015 sex scandal

== Tournament championships by school ==
School	Titles	Winning years
Cincinnati	2	2018, 2019
Houston	2	2021, 2022
SMU	2	2015, 2017
Memphis	2	2023, 2025
UConn	1	2016
Louisville	1	2014*
UAB (Note: First conference season in 2023–24.)	1	2024
South Florida	1	2026
Charlotte	0	
East Carolina	0	
Florida Atlantic	0	
North Texas	0	
Rice	0	
Temple	0	
Tulane	0	
Tulsa	0	
UCF	0	
UTSA	0	
Wichita State	0	

Italics indicate school no longer sponsors men's basketball in The American.

== See also ==
- Big East men's basketball tournament
- American Conference women's basketball tournament
