= 2014–15 American Athletic Conference men's basketball season =

- League: NCAA Division I
- Sport: Basketball
- Duration: November 2014 through March 2015
- Teams: 11
- TV partner(s): ESPN, CBS

Regular Season
- Season MVP: Nic Moore

Tournament

American Athletic Conference men's basketball seasons
- ← 2013–14 2015–16 →

2014–15 American Athletic Conference men's basketball standings
	Conf.				Overall
Team	W		L	PCT	W		L	PCT
No. 18 SMU †	15	–	3	.833	27	–	7	.794
Tulsa	14	–	4	.778	23	–	11	.676
Temple	13	–	5	.722	26	–	11	.703
Cincinnati	13	–	5	.722	23	–	11	.676
UConn	10	–	8	.556	20	–	15	.571
Memphis	10	–	8	.556	18	–	14	.563
Tulane	6	–	12	.333	15	–	16	.484
East Carolina	6	–	12	.333	14	–	19	.424
UCF	5	–	13	.278	12	–	18	.400
Houston	4	–	14	.222	13	–	19	.406
South Florida	3	–	15	.167	9	–	23	.281
† The American Tournament winner Rankings from AP poll

The 2014–15 American Athletic Conference men's basketball season took place between November 2014 and March 2015. Practices began in October 2014, with conference play beginning in December, and the season ended with the 2015 American Athletic Conference men's basketball tournament. The season was the second since the split of the original Big East Conference into two separate leagues.

This was the first season for East Carolina, Tulane, and Tulsa in American Athletic competition.

== Preseason ==
=== Coaching changes ===
- Tulsa Hired Frank Haith, after Former Coach Danny Manning took the Wake Forest job
- Kelvin Sampson was hired at Houston after former coach James Dickey resigned for Personal reasons
- Orlando Antigua was hired at USF, after USF rescinded their offer to Steve Masiello after it was reported that he had not graduated from the University of Kentucky, as his resume had stated. Masiello was originally hired to replace Stan Heath, who was fired

=== Predicted American Athletic results ===
At American Athletic Conference media day on October 29, the conference released their predictions for standings and All-Conference teams.

	Coaches
1.	Connecticut (6)
2.	SMU (5)
3.	Memphis
4.	Cincinnati
5.	Tulsa
6.	Temple
7.	Houston
8.	USF
9.	UCF
10.	East Carolina
11.	Tulane

() first place votes

=== Preseason All-AAC Teams ===
First Team	Second Team
Ryan Boatright, G, UCONN; Shaq Goodwin, F, MEM; Austin Nichols, F, MEM; Nic Moore, G, SMU; Markus Kennedy, F, SMU; James Woodard, G, TULSA	Amida Brimah, C, UCONN; Anthony Collins, G, USF; Chris Perry, F, USF; Will Cummings, G, TEM; Quenton DeCosey, G, TEM

American Athletic Preseason Player of the Year: Ryan Boatright, Connecticut
American Athletic Preseason Rookie of the Year: Daniel Hamilton, Connecticut

=== Preseason Watchlists ===
Naismith	John Wooden Award
Ryan Boatright, G, UConn; Nic Moore, G, SMU	Nic Moore, G, SMU

== Rankings ==
Legend
Increase in ranking
Decrease in ranking
Not ranked previous week

		Pre	Wk 2	Wk 3	Wk 4	Wk 5	Wk 6	Wk 7	Wk 8	Wk 9	Wk 10	Wk 11	Wk 12	Wk 13	Wk 14	Wk 15	Wk 16	Wk 17	Wk 18	Wk 19	Final
Cincinnati	AP	RV	RV	RV						RV					RV						
Cincinnati	C		RV	RV						RV					RV						
Connecticut	AP	17	17	24	RV																
Connecticut	C	15	17	22	23				RV												
East Carolina	AP																				
East Carolina	C																				
Houston	AP																				
Houston	C																				
Memphis	AP	RV	RV	RV																	
Memphis	C	RV	RV	RV	RV																
SMU	AP	22	23	RV							RV	RV		22	25	21	21	22	20		
SMU	C	22	22	RV	RV						RV	RV	RV	22	25	22	21	22	21		
South Florida	AP																				
South Florida	C																				
Temple	AP									RV				RV							
Temple	C									RV											
Tulane	AP																				
Tulane	C																				
Tulsa	AP												RV	RV							
Tulsa	C												RV	RV	RV						
UCF	AP																				
UCF	C																				

== AAC regular season ==
This table summarizes the head-to-head results between teams in conference play.

	Cincinnati	Connecticut	East Carolina	Houston	Memphis	SMU	South Florida	Temple	Tulane	Tulsa	UCF
vs. Cincinnati	–	1-1	1-1	0-2	1-1	0-2	0–1	1-1	1–1	0–1	0–2
vs. Connecticut	1-1	–	0–2	1–0	2–0	1–1	0-2	2-0	0–2	1-1	0–1
vs. East Carolina	1-1	2–0	–	1-1	1–1	1-0	1-1	2–0	1-0	2–0	0–2
vs. Houston	2-0	0–1	1-1	–	2-0	2–0	1-1	1–0	1-1	2-0	2–0
vs. Memphis	1-1	0–2	1–1	0-2	–	2-0	0–1	1–0	1-1	2-0	0–2
vs. SMU	2-0	1–1	0-1	0–2	0-2	–	0-2	0-2	0-1	0–2	0–2
vs. South Florida	1–0	2-0	1-1	1-1	1–0	2-0	–	2-0	2-0	2-0	1–1
vs. Temple	1-1	0-2	0–2	0–1	0–1	2-0	0-2	–	0-2	2–0	0–2
vs. Tulane	1–1	2–0	0-1	1–1	1-1	1-0	0-2	2-0	–	2–0	2–0
vs. Tulsa	1–0	1-1	0–2	0-2	0-2	2–0	0-2	0–2	0-2	–	0–1
vs. UCF	2–0	1-0	2-0	0-2	2-0	2–0	1–1	2-0	0-2	1-0	–
Total	13–5	10–8	6–12	4-14	10–8	15–3	3–15	13–5	6–12	14–4	5–13

== Postseason ==
- March 12–15, 2015 at the XL Center in Hartford, CT

2015 American Athletic Conference men's basketball tournament seeds and results
Seed	School	Conf.	Over.	Tiebreaker	First round March 12	Quarterfinals March 13	Semifinals March 14	Championship March 15
1.	SMU ‡†	15–3	24–6		Bye	vs. #8 East Carolina - W, 74-68	vs. #4 Temple - W, 69-56	vs. #6 Connecticut - W, 62-54
2.	Tulsa †	14–4	21–9		Bye	vs. #10 Houston - W, 59-51	vs. #6 Connecticut - L, 42–47	
3.	Cincinnati †	13–5	22–9	2-0 vs. SMU	Bye	vs. #6 Connecticut - L, 54–57		
4.	Temple†	13–5	22–9	0-2 vs. SMU	Bye	vs. #5 Memphis - W, 80-75	vs. #1 SMU - L, 56–69	
5.	Memphis†	10–8	18–13	2-0 vs. CONN	Bye	vs. #4 Temple - L, 75–80		
6.	Connecticut	10–8	17–13	0-2 vs. MEM	vs. #11 South Florida - W, 69-43	vs. #3 Cincinnati - W, 47-44	vs. #2 Tulsa - W, 47-42	vs. #1 SMU - L, 54–62
7.	Tulane	6–12	15-15	1-0 vs. ECU	vs. #10 Houston - L, 60–66			
8.	East Carolina	6–12	13–18	0-1 vs. TULN	vs. #9 UCF - W, 81-80 OT	vs. #1 SMU - L, 68–74		
9.	UCF	5–13	12–17		vs. #8 East Carolina - L, 80–81 OT			
10.	Houston	4–14	12–18		vs. #7 Tulane - W, 66-60	vs. #2 Tulsa - L, 51-59		
11.	South Florida	3–15	9-22		vs. #6 Connecticut - L, 43-69			
‡ – American regular season champions, and tournament No. 1 seed. † – Received a single-bye in the conference tournament.

=== NCAA tournament ===
Seed	Region	School	First Four	Round of 64	Round of 32	Sweet 16	Elite Eight	Final Four	Championship
6	South	SMU	Bye	vs. #11 UCLA - L, 59-60					
8	Midwest	Cincinnati	Bye	vs. #9 Purdue - W, 66-55 OT	vs. #1 Kentucky - L, 64-51				
		W–L (%):	0–0 –	1–1 .500	0–1 .000	0–0 –	0–0 –	0–0 –	0–0 – Total: 1–2 .333

=== National Invitation tournament ===
Seed	Bracket	School	First round	Second round	Quarterfinals	Semifinals	Finals
1	Temple	Temple	vs. #8 Bucknell - W, 73-67	vs. #5 George Washington - W, 90-77	vs. #3 Louisiana Tech - W, 77-59	vs. #2 Miami (FL) - L, 57-60	
2	Old Dominion	Tulsa	vs. #7 William & Mary - W, 70-67	vs. #3 Murray State - L, 62-83			
4	Richmond	Connecticut	vs. #5 Arizona State - L, 61-68				
		W–L (%):	2–1 .667	1–1 .500	1–0 1.000	0–1 .000	0–0 – Total: 4–3 .571

== Awards and honors ==
=== Conference awards and teams ===
All Conference and All Rookie teams were announced on March 10, Defensive Player of the Year, Sixth Man Award, Most Improved Player, and Sportsmanship Award were announced on March 11. Player of the Year and Coach of the year were announced on March 12

2015 American Athletic Conference Basketball Individual Awards
Award	Recipient(s)
American Athletic Conference Player of the Year	Nic Moore G., SMU
Coach of the Year	Fran Dunphy , TEMP
Rookie of the Year	Daniel Hamilton G/F., CONN
Scholar-Athlete of the Year	Pat Lenehan G., CONN
Most Improved Player	Yanick Moreira C., SMU
Sixth Man Award	Markus Kennedy F., SMU
Sportsmanship Award	Shaq Goodwin F., MEMPHIS

2015 American Athletic Conference All-Conference Teams|
First Team	Second Team	Honorable Mention	All-Rookie Team
Ryan Boatright ^{†}, G., CONN; Austin Nichols, F., MEMPH; Nic Moore ^{†}, G., SMU; Will Cummings, G., TEMP; James Woodard, G., TULSA	Octavius Ellis, F., CIN; Markus Kennedy, F., SMU; Yanick Moreira, C., SMU; Louis Dabney, G., TULN; Shaquille Harrison, G., TULSA	Troy Caupain, G., CIN; Amida Brimah, C., CONN; Daniel Hamilton, G/F., CONN; Jaylen Bond, F., TEMP	Adonys Henriquez, G., UCF; B. J. Taylor, G., UCF; Gary Clark, F., CIN; Daniel Hamilton ^{†}, G/F., CONN; B. J. Tyson ^{†}, G., ECU
^{†} - denotes unanimous selection
