= 2014–15 South Florida Bulls men's basketball team =

American college basketball season

2014–15 South Florida Bulls men's basketball
- Conference: American Athletic Conference
- Record: 9–23 (3–15 The American)
- Head coach: Orlando Antigua (1st season)
- Assistant coaches: Sergio Rouco; Rod Strickland; Oliver Antigua
- Home arena: USF Sun Dome

2014–15 American Athletic Conference men's basketball standings
| | Conf. | | | | Overall |
| Team | W | | L | PCT | W | | L | PCT |
|---|---|---|---|---|---|---|---|---|
| No. 18 SMU † | 15 | – | 3 | .833 | 27 | – | 7 | .794 |
| Tulsa | 14 | – | 4 | .778 | 23 | – | 11 | .676 |
| Temple | 13 | – | 5 | .722 | 26 | – | 11 | .703 |
| Cincinnati | 13 | – | 5 | .722 | 23 | – | 11 | .676 |
| UConn | 10 | – | 8 | .556 | 20 | – | 15 | .571 |
| Memphis | 10 | – | 8 | .556 | 18 | – | 14 | .563 |
| Tulane | 6 | – | 12 | .333 | 15 | – | 16 | .484 |
| East Carolina | 6 | – | 12 | .333 | 14 | – | 19 | .424 |
| UCF | 5 | – | 13 | .278 | 12 | – | 18 | .400 |
| Houston | 4 | – | 14 | .222 | 13 | – | 19 | .406 |
| South Florida | 3 | – | 15 | .167 | 9 | – | 23 | .281 |
† The American Tournament winner Rankings from AP poll

The 2014–15 South Florida Bulls men's basketball team represented the University of South Florida during the 2014–15 NCAA Division I men's basketball season. This was the 44th season of Basketball for USF, and the second as a member of the American Athletic Conference. The Bulls were coached by Orlando Antigua, who was in his first season. The Bulls played their home games at the USF Sun Dome. They finished the season 9–23, 3–15 in AAC play to finish in last place. They lost in the first round of the AAC tournament to UConn.

== Previous season ==
The Bulls finished the season 12–20, 3–15 in AAC play to finish in last place. They lost in the first round of the AAC tournament to Rutgers.

== Departures ==
| Name | Number | Pos. | Height | Weight | Year | Hometown | Notes |
|---|---|---|---|---|---|---|---|
| Martino Brock | 0 | G | 6'5" | 205 | Senior | Memphis, TN | Graduated |
| Musa Abdul-Aleem | 1 | F | 6'5" | 221 | Senior | Atlanta, GA | Graduated |
| Victor Rudd | 2 | F | 6'9" | 235 | Senior | Los Angeles, CA | Graduated |
| Zach LeDay | 3 | F | 6'7" | 245 | Sophomore | The Colony, TX | Transferred to Virginia Tech |
| John Egbunu | 5 | C | 6'10" | 245 | Freshman | Fort Walton Beach, FL | Transferred to Florida |
| Josh Heath | 10 | G | 6'2" | 165 | Freshman | Tampa, FL | Transferred to Georgia Tech |
| Shemiye McLendon | 15 | G | 6'3" | 217 | RS Junior | Vero Beach, FL | Transferred |
| Javonte Hawkins | 21 | G | 6'5" | 205 | Sophomore | Flint, MI | Transferred to Eastern Kentucky |
| Jordan Omogbehin | 35 | C | 7'3" | 315 | RS Sophomore | Lagos, Nigeria | Transferred to Morgan State |

=== Incoming transfers ===
| Name | Number | Pos. | Height | Weight | Year | Hometown | Previous School |
|---|---|---|---|---|---|---|---|
| Roddy Peters | 3 | G | 6'4" | 195 | Sophomore | District Heights, MD | Transferred from Maryland. Under NCAA transfer rules, Harris will have to redshirt for the 2014–15 season. Will have three years of remaining eligibility. |
| Nehemias Morillo | 5 | G | 6'6" | 190 | Junior | Philadelphia, PA | Junior college transferred from Monroe College. |
| Justin David | 14 | G | 6'2" | 180 | Sophomore | Pittsburgh, PA | Junior college transferred from Grove City College. |
| Jaleel Cousins | 15 | F | 6'10" | 260 | Junior | Mobile, AL | Junior college transferred from Navarro College. |

== Incoming recruits ==
College recruiting information
| Name | Hometown | School | Height | Weight | Commit date |
|---|---|---|---|---|---|
| Troy Holston; SG | Tampa, FL | Oldsmar Christian High School | 6 ft 4 in (1.93 m) | 180 lb (82 kg) | Aug 7, 2013 |
| Troy Holston; SG | Recruit ratings: Scout: Rivals: (70) | | | | |
| Dinero Mercurius; SG | Orlando, FL | Faith Baptist Christian School | 6 ft 4 in (1.93 m) | 165 lb (75 kg) | Feb 15, 2014 |
| Dinero Mercurius; SG | Recruit ratings: Scout: Rivals: (POST) | | | | |
| Ruben Guerrero; PF | Málaga, Spain | Sunrise Christian Academy | 6 ft 10 in (2.08 m) | 205 lb (93 kg) | May 1, 2014 |
| Ruben Guerrero; PF | Recruit ratings: Scout: Rivals: (NR) | | | | |
Overall recruit ranking:
Note: In many cases, Scout, Rivals, 247Sports, On3, and ESPN may conflict in their listings of height and weight.; In these cases, the average was taken. ESPN grades are on a 100-point scale.; Sources: "2014 Team Ranking". Rivals.

=== Recruiting Class of 2015 ===
College recruiting information
| Name | Hometown | School | Height | Weight | Commit date |
|---|---|---|---|---|---|
| Luis Santos; C | Bronx, NY | Sunrise Christian Academy | 6 ft 9 in (2.06 m) | 235 lb (107 kg) | Aug 5, 2014 |
| Luis Santos; C | Recruit ratings: Scout: Rivals: (80) | | | | |
Overall recruit ranking:
Note: In many cases, Scout, Rivals, 247Sports, On3, and ESPN may conflict in their listings of height and weight.; In these cases, the average was taken. ESPN grades are on a 100-point scale.; Sources: "2015 Team Ranking". Rivals.

== Roster ==
2014–15 South Florida Bulls men's basketball team
Players
Coaches

| Pos. | # | Name | Height | Weight | Year | Hometown |
|---|---|---|---|---|---|---|
| F | 0 | Dre Clayton | 6 ft 6 in (1.98 m) | 245 lb (111 kg) | RS Fr | Orlando, FL |
| F/C | 1 | Chris Perry | 6 ft 8 in (2.03 m) | 266 lb (121 kg) | So | Bartow, FL |
| G | 3 | Roddy Peters (redshirt) | 6 ft 3 in (1.91 m) | 195 lb (88 kg) | So | District Heights, MD |
| G | 4 | Corey Jr. Allen | 6 ft 1 in (1.85 m) | 152 lb (69 kg) | Sr | St. Louis, MO |
| G | 5 | Nehemias Morillo | 6 ft 6 in (1.98 m) | 220 lb (100 kg) | Jr | Santiago, Dominican Republic |
| G | 11 | Anthony Collins | 6 ft 1 in (1.85 m) | 175 lb (79 kg) | Sr | Houston, TX |
| G | 13 | Jake Bodway | 6 ft 2 in (1.88 m) | 191 lb (87 kg) | RS Fr | Minneapolis, MN |
| G | 14 | Justin David | 6 ft 2 in (1.88 m) | 185 lb (84 kg) | So | Pittsburgh, PA |
| C | 15 | Jaleel Cousins | 6 ft 10 in (2.08 m) | 260 lb (118 kg) | Jr | Mobile, AL |
| G | 25 | Troy Jr. Holston | 6 ft 4 in (1.93 m) | 187 lb (85 kg) | Fr | Queens, NY |
| G | 30 | Dinero Mercurius | 6 ft 4 in (1.93 m) | 165 lb (75 kg) | Fr | Bronx, NY |
| F/C | 33 | Ruben Guerrero | 6 ft 10 in (2.08 m) | 210 lb (95 kg) | Fr | Málaga, Spain |
| G/F | 35 | Bo Zeigler | 6 ft 6 in (1.98 m) | 198 lb (90 kg) | RS Fr | Detroit, MI |

Head coach

- Orlando Antigua

Assistant coach(es)

- Sergio Rouco
- Rod Strickland
- Oliver Antigua

Legend

- (C) Team captain
- (S) Suspended
- (I) Ineligible
- (W) Walk-on
- Injured
- Current redshirt

Roster
Last update: September 6, 2014

== Schedule and results ==
| Date time, TV | Rank^{#} | Opponent^{#} | Result | Record | Site (attendance) city, state |
Exhibition
| 11/08/2014*; 4:00 pm | | Indiana (PA) (DII) | W 77–72 | | USF Sun Dome (2,996); Tampa, FL |
Non-conference regular season
| 11/14/2014*; 7:00 pm | | Flagler (DII) | W 75–61 | 1–0 | USF Sun Dome (3,621); Tampa, FL |
| 11/16/2014*; 2:00 pm, ESPN3 | | Jackson State; Global Sports Invitational | W 73–64 | 2–0 | USF Sun Dome (3,095); Tampa, FL |
| 11/20/2014*; 7:00 pm | | at UAB | W 73–71 ^{OT} | 3–0 | Bartow Arena (2,501); Birmingham, AL |
| 11/23/2014*; 4:00 pm, ESPNU | | at NC State; Global Sports Invitational | L 65–68 | 3–1 | PNC Arena (15,157); Raleigh, NC |
| 11/25/2014*; 7:00 pm, ESPN3 | | Hofstra; Global Sports Invitational | W 71–70 | 4–1 | USF Sun Dome (3,228); Tampa, FL |
| 11/29/2014*; 2:00 pm, ESPN3 | | Jacksonville; Global Sports Invitational | W 79–65 | 5–1 | USF Sun Dome (2,993); Tampa, FL |
| 12/02/2014*; 9:00 pm, SECN | | at Alabama | L 71–82 | 5–2 | Coleman Coliseum (9,342); Tuscaloosa, AL |
| 12/06/2014*; 3:00 pm, ESPN3 | | at Detroit | L 57–67 | 5–3 | Calihan Hall (2,664); Detroit, MI |
| 12/15/2014*; 7:00 pm, ESPN3 | | Georgia Southern | L 63–68 | 5–4 | USF Sun Dome (2,912); Tampa, FL |
| 12/18/2014*; 7:00 pm, CBSSN | | Seton Hall | L 69–89 | 5–5 | USF Sun Dome (3,330); Tampa, FL |
| 12/20/2014*; 2:00 pm, FSN | | vs. Florida State; Orange Bowl Basketball Classic | L 62–75 | 5–6 | BB&T Center (10,175); Sunrise, FL |
| 12/23/2014*; 1:00 pm, ESPN3 | | Southeastern Louisiana | W 78–63 | 6–6 | USF Sun Dome (2,818); Tampa, FL |
| 12/28/2014*; 3:00 pm, ESPN3 | | Bowling Green | L 70–79 | 6–7 | USF Sun Dome (3,513); Tampa, FL |
Conference regular season
| 12/31/2014; 5:00 pm, ESPN2 | | at SMU | L 49–83 | 6–8 (0–1) | Moody Coliseum (6,624); Dallas, TX |
| 01/03/2015; 7:00 pm, ESPN3 | | East Carolina | W 58–50 | 7–8 (1–1) | USF Sun Dome (3,184); Tampa, FL |
| 01/06/2015; 7:00 pm, ESPN2 | | UConn | L 44–58 | 7–9 (1–2) | USF Sun Dome (6,128); Tampa, FL |
| 01/11/2015; 3:00 pm, ESPN3 | | at Tulane | L 51–56 ^{OT} | 7–10 (1–3) | Devlin Fieldhouse (1,977); New Orleans, LA |
| 01/17/2015; 11:00 am, ESPNU | | Tulsa | L 58–75 | 7–11 (1–4) | USF Sun Dome (3,165); Tampa, FL |
| 01/22/2015; 6:30 pm, ESPNews | | at Temple | L 48–73 | 7–12 (1–5) | Liacouras Center (5,352); Philadelphia, PA |
| 01/25/2015; 12:00 pm, CBSSN | | at UConn | L 53–66 | 7–13 (1–6) | XL Center (14,105); Hartford, CT |
| 01/28/2015; 7:00 pm, ESPNU | | SMU | L 52–63 | 7–14 (1–7) | USF Sun Dome (3,589); Tampa, FL |
| 01/31/2015; 1:00 pm, ESPNews | | at Tulsa | L 71–78 ^{OT} | 7–15 (1–8) | Reynolds Center (4,939); Tulsa, OK |
| 02/04/2015; 6:30 pm, ESPNews | | Temple | L 48–61 | 7–16 (1–9) | USF Sun Dome (3,249); Tampa, FL |
| 02/07/2015; 8:00 pm, CBSSN | | at Cincinnati | L 58–63 | 7–17 (1–10) | Fifth Third Arena (11,670); Cincinnati, OH |
| 02/11/2015; 7:00 pm, ESPNews | | at UCF; War on I-4 | L 63–72 | 7–18 (1–11) | CFE Arena (6,201); Orlando, FL |
| 02/14/2015; 12:00 pm, ESPNU | | Memphis | L 48–75 | 7–19 (1–12) | USF Sun Dome (3,288); Tampa, FL |
| 02/17/2015; 7:00 pm, ESPNews | | Houston | W 69–67 | 8–19 (2–12) | USF Sun Dome (3,128); Tampa, FL |
| 02/21/2015; 11:00 am, ESPNU | | at East Carolina | L 60–73 | 8–20 (2–13) | Williams Arena (5,073); Greenville, NC |
| 03/01/2015; 3:00 pm, ESPN3 | | at Houston | L 55–72 | 8–21 (2–14) | Hofheinz Pavilion (2,816); Houston, TX |
| 03/04/2015; 7:00 pm, ESPNU | | UCF; War on I-4 | W 74-45 | 9–21 (3–14) | USF Sun Dome (3,417); Tampa, FL |
| 03/07/2015; 4:00 pm, ESPNews | | Tulane | L 63-67 | 9–22 (3–15) | USF Sun Dome (3,163); Tampa, FL |
American Athletic Conference tournament
| 03/12/2015; 8:00 pm, ESPNews | | vs. UConn; First Round | L 43–69 | 9–23 | XL Center; Hartford, CT |
*Non-conference game. ^{#}Rankings from AP Poll. (#) Tournament seedings in parentheses. All times are in Eastern Time.
