= Phillip Nolan (basketball) =

American basketball player (born 1993)

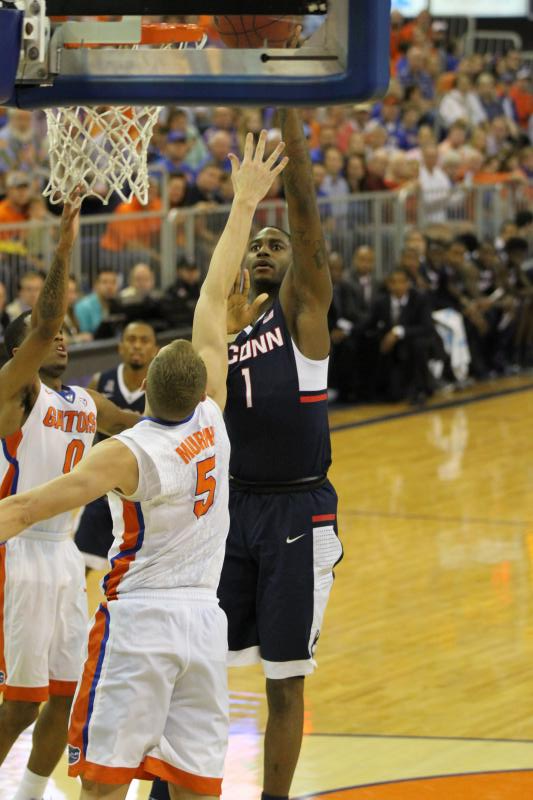
- Nolan shooting for Connecticut in 2015

Personal information
- Born: November 3, 1993 (age 33)
- Listed height: 6 ft 10 in (2.08 m)
- Listed weight: 212 lb (96 kg)

Career information
- High school: Riverside University (Milwaukee, Wisconsin)
- College: UConn (2012–2016)
- NBA draft: 2016: undrafted
- Playing career: 2016–2017
- Position: Power forward / center

Career history
- 2016–2017: Team FOG Næstved

Career highlights
- NCAA champion (2014); Danish Cup champion (2017)

Phillip Dequan Nolan (born November 3, 1993) is an American former basketball player. He played college basketball for the Connecticut Huskies.

Nolan was on the Huskies' 2013–14 NCAA Championship team. He played for Team FOG Næstved in Denmark in the 2016-2017 season. In 2017, Nolan made a game-winning free throw that won Fog Næstved the Basketligaen championship.

== College statistics ==
Year	Team	GP	GS	MPG	FG%	3P%	FT%	RPG	APG	SPG	BPG	PPG
2012–13	Connecticut	23	1	10.8	.429	.000	.529	2.1	.3	0	.5	1.4
2013–14	Connecticut	40	19	14.2	.526	.000	.775	2.4	.2	.2	.5	3.3
2014–15	Connecticut	34	10	15.2	.469	.000	.286	1.9	.1	.2	.4	1.5
2015–16	Connecticut	32	13	10.6	.537	.000	.818	1.5	.2	.1	.3	1.7
Career		129	43	12.7	.490	.000	.602	2.0	.2	.1	.4	2.0
