= 2014–15 East Carolina Pirates men's basketball team =

American college basketball season

2014–15 East Carolina Pirates men's basketball
- Conference: American Athletic Conference
- Record: 14–19 (6–12 The American)
- Head coach: Jeff Lebo (5th season)
- Assistant coaches: Mike Netti; Michael Perry; Ken Potosnak
- Home arena: Williams Arena

2014–15 American Athletic Conference men's basketball standings
	Conf.				Overall
Team	W		L	PCT	W		L	PCT
No. 18 SMU †	15	–	3	.833	27	–	7	.794
Tulsa	14	–	4	.778	23	–	11	.676
Temple	13	–	5	.722	26	–	11	.703
Cincinnati	13	–	5	.722	23	–	11	.676
UConn	10	–	8	.556	20	–	15	.571
Memphis	10	–	8	.556	18	–	14	.563
Tulane	6	–	12	.333	15	–	16	.484
East Carolina	6	–	12	.333	14	–	19	.424
UCF	5	–	13	.278	12	–	18	.400
Houston	4	–	14	.222	13	–	19	.406
South Florida	3	–	15	.167	9	–	23	.281
† The American Tournament winner Rankings from AP poll

The 2014–15 East Carolina Pirates men's basketball team represented East Carolina University during the 2014–15 NCAA Division I men's basketball season. The Pirates, led by fifth year head coach Jeff Lebo, played their home games at Williams Arena at Minges Coliseum and were first year members of the American Athletic Conference. They finished the season 14–19, 6–12 in AAC play to finish in a tie for seventh place. They advanced to the quarterfinals of the American Athletic tournament where they lost to SMU.

== Previous season ==
The Pirates finished the season 17–17, 5–11 in C-USA play to finish in a tie for 12th place. They advanced to the second round of the C-USA tournament where they lost to UTEP. They were invited to the CollegeInsider.com Tournament where they lost in the first round to Wright State.

== Departures ==
Name	Number	Pos.	Height	Weight	Year	Hometown	Notes
Akeem Richmond	1	G	6'0"	180	Senior	Sanford, NC	Graduated
Petar Torlak	3	G	6'1"	185	Senior	Belgrade, Serbia	Graduated
Brandan Stith	25	F	6'7"	215	Freshman	Lawrenceville, VA	Transferred to Old Dominion

=== Incoming transfers ===
Name	Number	Pos.	Height	Weight	Year	Hometown	Previous School
Kanu Aja	44	F	6'10"	255	Junior	Baltimore, MD	Junior college transferred from City College of San Francisco.

== Incoming recruits ==
College recruiting information
Name	Hometown	School	Height	Weight	Commit date
Lance Tejada; PG	Hollywood, CA	Blanche Ely High School	6 ft 1 in (1.85 m)	175 lb (79 kg)	Aug 31, 2013
Lance Tejada; PG	Recruit ratings: Scout: Rivals: (79)				
Grant Bryant; SF	Marietta, GA	Kell High School	6 ft 6 in (1.98 m)	180 lb (82 kg)	Sep 1, 2013
Grant Bryant; SF	Recruit ratings: Scout: Rivals: (NR)				
Bunyon Tyson; PG	Wadesboro, NC	Anson High School	6 ft 3 in (1.91 m)	175 lb (79 kg)	Jun 13, 2013
Bunyon Tyson; PG	Recruit ratings: Scout: Rivals: (NR)				
Overall recruit ranking:
Note: In many cases, Scout, Rivals, 247Sports, On3, and ESPN may conflict in their listings of height and weight.; In these cases, the average was taken. ESPN grades are on a 100-point scale.; Sources: "2014 Team Ranking". Rivals.

=== Recruiting Class of 2015 ===
College recruiting information
Name	Hometown	School	Height	Weight	Commit date
Kentrell Barkley; SF	Durham, NC	Northern High School	6 ft 5 in (1.96 m)	195 lb (88 kg)	Sep 1, 2014
Kentrell Barkley; SF	Recruit ratings: Scout: Rivals: (NR)				
Overall recruit ranking:
Note: In many cases, Scout, Rivals, 247Sports, On3, and ESPN may conflict in their listings of height and weight.; In these cases, the average was taken. ESPN grades are on a 100-point scale.; Sources: "2015 Team Ranking". Rivals.

== Roster ==
2014–15 East Carolina Pirates men's basketball team
Players
Coaches

Pos.	#	Name	Height	Weight	Year	Previous school	Hometown
G	0	Terry Whisnant	6 ft 3 in (1.91 m)	180 lb (82 kg)	RS Jr	Florida State	Cherryville, NC
F	1	Grant Bryant	6 ft 5 in (1.96 m)	205 lb (93 kg)	Fr	Kell	Kennesaw, GA
G	2	Caleb White	6 ft 7 in (2.01 m)	190 lb (86 kg)	So	Virginia Episcopal	Buckingham, VA
G	4	Prince Williams	6 ft 5 in (1.96 m)	200 lb (91 kg)	Jr	Broughton	Raleigh, NC
G	5	Lance Tejada	6 ft 2 in (1.88 m)	190 lb (86 kg)	Fr	Blanche Ely	Pompano Beach, FL
G	10	Francis Edosomwan	6 ft 3 in (1.91 m)	220 lb (100 kg)	Sr	Charlotte Christian	Charlotte, NC
G	11	Antonio Robinson	6 ft 4 in (1.93 m)	175 lb (79 kg)	Sr	Louisburg College	Winston-Salem, NC
F	13	Michel-Ofik Nzege	6 ft 7 in (2.01 m)	215 lb (98 kg)	RS So	Winston-Salem State	Geneva, Switzerland
G	15	Peyton Robbins	6 ft 3 in (1.91 m)	200 lb (91 kg)	Jr	St. David's	Raleigh, NC
G	21	B. J. Tyson	6 ft 3 in (1.91 m)	190 lb (86 kg)	Fr	Anson	Wadesboro, NC
G	22	Paris Roberts-Campbell	6 ft 3 in (1.91 m)	185 lb (84 kg)	Sr	United Faith Christian Academy	Charlotte, NC
F	24	Keith Armstrong	6 ft 7 in (2.01 m)	240 lb (109 kg)	Jr	Robert Morris	Raleigh, NC
G	31	Greg Alexander	6 ft 4 in (1.93 m)	200 lb (91 kg)	So	Kecoughtan	Hampton, VA
F	34	Michael Zangari	6 ft 9 in (2.06 m)	230 lb (104 kg)	Jr	Red Land	Etters, PA
F	41	Marshall Guimette	6 ft 10 in (2.08 m)	250 lb (113 kg)	RS So	Harrison	Kennesaw, GA
F	44	Kanu Aja	6 ft 9 in (2.06 m)	245 lb (111 kg)	Jr	City College of San Francisco	Baltimore, MD

Head coach

- Jeff Lebo (North Carolina)

Assistant coach(es)

- Mike Netti (Syracuse)
- Michael Perry (Richmond)
- Ken Potosnak (Randolph–Macon)

Legend

- (C) Team captain
- (S) Suspended
- (I) Ineligible
- (W) Walk-on
- Injured
- Current redshirt

Roster

== Schedule ==
Date time, TV	Rank^{#}	Opponent^{#}	Result	Record	Site (attendance) city, state
Regular season
11/14/2014*; 7:00 pm		North Carolina Wesleyan; Gulf Coast Showcase Opening Round	W 99–81	1–0	Williams Arena (5,096); Greenville, NC
11/16/2014*; 3:00 pm, ESPN3		UNC Asheville	L 79–83	1–1	Williams Arena (4,149); Greenville, NC
11/20/2014*; 7:00 pm		Virginia Lynchburg	W 92–51	2–1	Williams Arena (3,966); Greenville, NC
11/24/2014*; 12:00 pm		vs. Green Bay; Gulf Coast Showcase quarterfinals	L 49–66	2–2	Germain Arena (2,118); Estero, FL
11/25/2014*; 12:00 pm		vs. Fresno State; Gulf Coast Showcase consolation round	W 58–52	3–2	Germain Arena (240); Estero, FL
11/26/2014*; 2:30 pm		vs. Hawaiʻi; Gulf Coast Showcase 5th place game	L 73–75	3–3	Germain Arena (271); Estero, FL
11/30/2014*; 2:00 pm, ESPN3		Central Connecticut	W 74–59	4–3	Williams Arena (3,705); Greenville, NC
12/03/2014*; 7:00 pm		at Florida Atlantic	L 63–72	4–4	FAU Arena (1,219); Boca Raton, FL
12/07/2014*; 3:00 pm, ESPNU		at No. 12 North Carolina	L 64–108	4–5	Dean Smith Center (18,741); Chapel Hill, NC
12/13/2014*; 5:00 pm, ESPN3		James Madison	W 70–58	5–5	Williams Arena (4,759); Greenville, NC
12/20/2014*; 7:00 pm		at UNC Wilmington	L 54–66	5–6	Trask Coliseum (4,388); Wilmington, NC
12/22/2014*; 7:00 pm, ESPN3		Florida A&M	W 75–57	6–6	Williams Arena (4,234); Greenville, NC
12/28/2014*; 2:00 pm, ESPN3		UNC Greensboro	W 71–50	7–6	Williams Arena (4,418); Greenville, NC
12/31/2014; 12:00 pm, ESPNews		Tulane	L 59–67	7–7 (0–1)	Williams Arena (4,358); Greenville, NC
01/03/2015; 7:00 pm, ESPN3		at South Florida	L 50–58	7–8 (0–2)	USF Sun Dome (3,184); Tampa, FL
01/06/2015; 7:00 pm, ESPNU		at Cincinnati	L 48–69	7–9 (0–3)	Fifth Third Arena (7,516); Cincinnati, OH
01/14/2015; 7:00 pm, ESPNU		Houston	W 66–61	8–9 (1–3)	Williams Arena (4,368); Greenville, NC
01/17/2015; 4:00 pm, CBSSN		at SMU	L 54–77	8–10 (1–4)	Moody Coliseum (7,001); Dallas, TX
01/24/2015; 12:00 pm, ESPNews		Tulsa	L 64–66	8–11 (1–5)	Williams Arena (4,968); Greenville, NC
01/28/2015; 9:00 pm, CBSSN		at Memphis	L 58–70	8–12 (1–6)	FedEx Forum (13,335); Memphis, TN
02/01/2015; 1:00 pm, CBSSN		Cincinnati	W 50–46	9–12 (2–6)	Williams Arena (4,574); Greenville, NC
02/04/2015; 7:00 pm, ESPNU		at UConn	L 52–65	9–13 (2–7)	Gampel Pavilion (8,985); Storrs, CT
02/07/2015; 5:00 pm, ESPN3		UCF	W 67–49	10–13 (3–7)	Williams Arena (5,305); Greenville, NC
02/10/2015; 7:00 pm, ESPNU		Memphis	W 64–53	11–13 (4–7)	Williams Arena (4,519); Greenville, NC
02/14/2015; 2:00 pm, CBSSN		at Temple	L 53–66	11–14 (4–8)	Liacouras Center (8,121); Philadelphia, PA
02/18/2015; 7:00 pm, ESPNU		at Tulsa	L 58–69	11–15 (4–9)	Reynolds Center (4,263); Tulsa, OK
02/21/2015; 11:00 am, ESPNU		South Florida	W 73–60	12–15 (5–9)	Williams Arena (5,073); Greenville, NC
02/25/2015; 7:00 pm, ESPNU		UConn	L 49–60	12–16 (5–10)	Williams Arena (6,856); Greenville, NC
02/28/2015; 12:00 pm, ESPNews		at UCF	W 71–66	13–16 (6–10)	CFE Arena (3,740); Orlando, FL
03/05/2015; 7:00 pm, ESPNU		Temple	L 56–70	13–17 (6–11)	Williams Arena (4,790); Greenville, NC
03/08/2015; 2:00 pm, ESPNews		at Houston	L 52-74	13–18 (6–12)	Hofheinz Pavilion (2,879); Houston, TX
American Athletic Conference tournament
03/12/2015; 3:30 pm, ESPNU		vs. UCF; First Round	W 81–80 ^{OT}	14–18	XL Center; Hartford, CT
03/13/2015; 12:00 pm, ESPN2		vs. No. 20 SMU; Quarterfinals	L 68–74	14–19	XL Center; Hartford, CT
*Non-conference game. ^{#}Rankings from AP Poll. (#) Tournament seedings in parentheses. All times are in Eastern Time.
