= 2014–15 UCF Knights men's basketball team =

American college basketball season

2014–15 UCF Knights men's basketball
- Conference: American Athletic Conference
- Record: 12–18 (5–13 The American)
- Head coach: Donnie Jones (5th season)
- Assistant coaches: Shawn Finney; Darren Tillis; Tim Thomas
- Home arena: CFE Arena

2014–15 American Athletic Conference men's basketball standings
	Conf.				Overall
Team	W		L	PCT	W		L	PCT
No. 18 SMU †	15	–	3	.833	27	–	7	.794
Tulsa	14	–	4	.778	23	–	11	.676
Temple	13	–	5	.722	26	–	11	.703
Cincinnati	13	–	5	.722	23	–	11	.676
UConn	10	–	8	.556	20	–	15	.571
Memphis	10	–	8	.556	18	–	14	.563
Tulane	6	–	12	.333	15	–	16	.484
East Carolina	6	–	12	.333	14	–	19	.424
UCF	5	–	13	.278	12	–	18	.400
Houston	4	–	14	.222	13	–	19	.406
South Florida	3	–	15	.167	9	–	23	.281
† The American Tournament winner Rankings from AP poll

The 2014–15 UCF Knights men's basketball team represented the University of Central Florida during the 2014–15 NCAA Division I men's basketball season. The Knights competed in Division I of the National Collegiate Athletic Association (NCAA) in the American Athletic Conference (The American). The Knights, in the program's 46th season of basketball, were led by fifth-year head coach Donnie Jones, and played their home games at the CFE Arena on the university's main campus in Orlando, Florida. They finished the season 12–18, 5–13 in The American to finish in ninth place. They lost in the first round of the AAC tournament to East Carolina.

== Previous season ==
In the previous year, the Knights finished the season 13–18, 4–14 in The American in a tie for eighth place. They advanced to the quarterfinals of the conference tournament, where they lost to Cincinnati.

== Departures ==
Name	Number	Pos.	Height	Weight	Year	Hometown	Reason for departure
Tristan Spurlock	1	F	6'8"	230	RS senior	Woodbridge, VA	Graduated
Isaiah Sykes	3	G/F	6'6"	220	Senior	Detroit, MI	Graduated/went undrafted 2014 NBA draft
Eugene McCrory	5	F	6'8"	240	Junior	Riverdale, FL	Transferred to Tampa
Tyler Coons	10	G	6'2"	185	Sophomore	Orlando, FL	Walk-on didn't return
Calvin Newell	11	G	6'1"	210	Senior	Philadelphia, PA	Graduated
Isaac Lang	21	G	6'1"	195	Senior	Tampa, FL	Graduated
Steven Haney	25	G/F	6'6"	190	Freshman	Fort Lauderdale, FL	Transferred to Loyola Marymount

=== Incoming transfers ===
Name	Number	Pos.	Height	Weight	Year	Hometown	Previous school
A. J. Davis	3	F	6'9"	208	RS sophomore	Buford, GA	Transferred from Tennessee. Under NCAA transfer rules, Davis had to redshirt for the 2014–15 season. Had three years of remaining eligibility.
Shaheed Davis	33	F	6'9"	200	Junior	Warren, OH	Junior college transfer from Eastern Florida State College

== Incoming recruits ==
College recruiting
Name	Hometown	School	Height	Weight	Commit date
Adonys Henriquez; SG	Orlando, FL	Orlando Christian Prep	6 ft 5 in (1.96 m)	185 lb (84 kg)	Sep 29, 2013
Adonys Henriquez; SG	Recruit ratings: Scout: Rivals: (80)				
B.J. Taylor; PG	Orlando, FL	Boone High School	6 ft 2 in (1.88 m)	177 lb (80 kg)	Aug 8, 2013
B.J. Taylor; PG	Recruit ratings: Scout: Rivals: (75)				
Terrell Miller; PF	Jacksonville, FL	Arlington Country Day School	6 ft 8 in (2.03 m)	250 lb (110 kg)	Apr 3, 2014
Terrell Miller; PF	Recruit ratings: Scout: Rivals: (70)				
Marshall Holmes; SG	Tampa, FL	Berkeley Prep	6 ft 3 in (1.91 m)	N/A	N/A
Marshall Holmes; SG	Recruit ratings: Scout: Rivals: (NR)				
Overall recruit ranking:
Note: In many cases, Scout, Rivals, 247Sports, On3, and ESPN may conflict in their listings of height and weight.; In these cases, the average was taken. ESPN grades are on a 100-point scale.; Sources: "2014 Team Ranking". Rivals.

=== Recruiting class of 2015 ===
College recruiting
Name	Hometown	School	Height	Weight	Commit date
Chance McSpadden; SG	Winter Haven, FL	Winter Haven High School	6 ft 3 in (1.91 m)	175 lb (79 kg)	May 1, 2014
Chance McSpadden; SG	Recruit ratings: Scout: Rivals: (81)				
Chad Brown; PF	Deltona, FL	Deltona High School	6 ft 8 in (2.03 m)	210 lb (95 kg)	May 1, 2014
Chad Brown; PF	Recruit ratings: Scout: Rivals: (NR)				
Overall recruit ranking:
Note: In many cases, Scout, Rivals, 247Sports, On3, and ESPN may conflict in their listings of height and weight.; In these cases, the average was taken. ESPN grades are on a 100-point scale.; Sources: "2015 Team Ranking". Rivals.

== Roster ==
2014–15 UCF Knights men's basketball team
Players
Coaches

Pos.	#	Name	Height	Weight	Year	Hometown
G	1	B. J. Taylor	6 ft 2 in (1.88 m)	200 lb (91 kg)	Fr	Orlando, FL
G	2	Isiah Thomas	5 ft 11 in (1.8 m)	160 lb (73 kg)	Fr	Wesley Chapel, FL
G/F	3	A. J. Davis (redshirt)	6 ft 9 in (2.06 m)	212 lb (96 kg)	So	Buford, GA
G	4	Daiquan Walker	6 ft 2 in (1.88 m)	185 lb (84 kg)	Jr	Philadelphia, PA
G	10	Adonys Henriquez	6 ft 6 in (1.98 m)	210 lb (95 kg)	Fr	Orlando, FL
G	11	Brandon Goodwin	6 ft 0 in (1.83 m)	180 lb (82 kg)	So	Norcross, GA
G	12	Matt Williams	6 ft 5 in (1.96 m)	220 lb (100 kg)	Jr	Orlando, FL
F	15	Dylan Karell	6 ft 11 in (2.11 m)	240 lb (109 kg)	Jr	North Miami Beach, FL
G	20	Myles Davis	6 ft 3 in (1.91 m)	185 lb (84 kg)	Sr	Winter Haven, FL
G	24	Djordjije Mumin	6 ft 5 in (1.96 m)	205 lb (93 kg)	Fr	Podgorica, Montenegro
G	25	Marshall Holmes	6 ft 3 in (1.91 m)	175 lb (79 kg)	Fr	Tampa, FL
F	32	Kasey Wilson	6 ft 7 in (2.01 m)	235 lb (107 kg)	Sr	North Port, FL
F	33	Shaheed Davis	6 ft 9 in (2.06 m)	210 lb (95 kg)	Jr	Warren, OH
C	34	Justin McBride	6 ft 10 in (2.08 m)	325 lb (147 kg)	So	Starke, FL
F	52	Staphon Blair	6 ft 9 in (2.06 m)	255 lb (116 kg)	Jr	Fort Lauderdale, FL

Head coach

- Donnie Jones (Pikeville)

Assistant coach(es)

- Shawn Finney (Fairmont)
- Darren Tillis (Paul Quinn)
- Tim Thomas (Wheeling Jesuit)

Legend

- (C) Team captain
- (S) Suspended
- (I) Ineligible
- (W) Walk-on
- Injured
- Current redshirt

Roster

== Schedule and results ==
Date time, TV	Rank^{#}	Opponent^{#}	Result	Record	Site (attendance) city, state
Exhibition
11/04/2014*; 7:00 pm		Flagler	W 96–70	–	CFE Arena; Orlando, FL
11/11/2014*; 7:00 pm		Georgia College	W 82–65	–	CFE Arena; Orlando, FL
Non-conference regular season
11/16/2014*; 6:00 pm, ESPN3		Stetson	W 64–55	1–0	CFE Arena (4,578); Orlando, FL
11/20/2014*; 7:00 pm		Eckerd	W 76–59	2–0	CFE Arena (3,236); Orlando, FL
11/23/2014*; 6:00 pm, ESPN3		USC Upstate	W 76–69	3–0	CFE Arena (3,413); Orlando, FL
11/26/2014*; 7:00 pm, ESPN3		Davidson	L 69–95	3–1	CFE Arena (3,458); Orlando, FL
11/30/2014*; 6:00 pm, ESPN3		Bethune-Cookman	W 75–67	4–1	CFE Arena (3,258); Orlando, FL
12/02/2014*; 7:00 pm, ESPN3		Georgia Southern	W 61–59	5–1	CFE Arena (3,544); Orlando, FL
12/06/2014*; 2:00 pm, ESPN3		at Florida State	L 73–96	5–2	Donald L. Tucker Civic Center (5,732); Tallahassee, FL
12/11/2014*; 8:00 pm, ESPN3		at UIC	L 60–71	5–3	UIC Pavilion (2,308); Chicago, IL
12/13/2014*; 8:00 pm, ESPN3		Florida Atlantic	L 41–54	5–4	CFE Arena (6,180); Orlando, FL
12/17/2014*; 7:30 pm, ESPN3		Detroit	W 75–70	6–4	CFE Arena (3,428); Orlando, FL
12/22/2014*; 7:00 pm, ESPN3		Southeastern Louisiana	W 70–65	7–4	CFE Arena (3,389); Orlando, FL
American regular season
12/31/2014; 12:00 pm, ESPNU		Tulsa	L 54–56	7–5 (0–1)	CFE Arena (3,440); Orlando, FL
01/04/2015; 12:00 pm, ESPNews		at Temple	L 78–84	7–6 (0–2)	Liacouras Center (4,008); Philadelphia, PA
01/06/2015; 7:00 pm, ESPNews		at Houston	W 79–78 ^{OT}	8–6 (1–2)	Hofheinz Pavilion (2,003); Houston, TX
01/11/2015; 2:00 pm, CBSSN		SMU	L 61–70	8–7 (1–3)	CFE Arena (3,664); Orlando, FL
01/14/2015; 7:00 pm, ESPN3		Tulane	W 103–100 ^{3OT}	9–7 (2–3)	CFE Arena (4,503); Orlando, FL
01/17/2015; 2:00 pm, ESPNews		at Memphis	L 79–99	9–8 (2–4)	FedEx Forum (14,027); Memphis, TN
01/22/2015; 12:00 pm, CBSSN		at UConn	L 53–66	9–9 (2–5)	XL Center (10,167); Hartford, CT
01/25/2015; 2:00 pm, CBSSN		Cincinnati	L 46–56	9–10 (2–6)	CFE Arena (3,874); Orlando, FL
01/28/2015; 7:00 pm, CBSSN		Temple	L 62–86	9–11 (2–7)	CFE Arena (4,224); Orlando, FL
01/31/2015; 8:00 pm, ESPNU		at SMU	L 56–75	9–12 (2–8)	Moody Coliseum (7,043); Dallas, TX
02/07/2015; 5:00 pm, ESPN3		at East Carolina	L 49–67	9–13 (2–9)	Williams Arena (5,305); Greenville, NC
02/11/2015; 7:00 pm, ESPNews		South Florida	W 73–62	10–13 (3–9)	CFE Arena (6,201); Orlando, FL
02/15/2015; 2:00 pm, ESPN3		Houston	W 56–54	11–13 (4–9)	CFE Arena (4,269); Orlando, FL
02/19/2015; 7:00 pm, ESPNews		at Tulane	W 69–55	12–13 (5–9)	Devlin Fieldhouse (2,021); New Orleans, LA
02/22/2015; 2:00 pm, CBSSN		Memphis	L 65–75 ^{OT}	12–14 (5–10)	CFE Arena (4,543); Orlando, FL
02/25/2015; 7:30 pm, CBSSN		at Cincinnati	L 60–83	12–15 (5–11)	Fifth Third Arena (9,825); Cincinnati, OH
02/28/2015; 12:00 pm, ESPNews		East Carolina	L 66–71	12–16 (5–12)	CFE Arena (3,740); Orlando, FL
03/04/2015; 7:00 pm, ESPNU		at South Florida	L 45–74	12–17 (5–13)	USF Sun Dome (3,417); Tampa, FL
2015 American Athletic Conference tournament
03/12/2015; 3:30 pm, ESPNU		vs. East Carolina; First Round	L 80–81 ^{OT}	12–18	XL Center; Hartford, CT
*Non-conference game. ^{#}Rankings from AP Poll. (#) Tournament seedings in parentheses. All times are in Eastern Time.
