= 2014–15 Memphis Tigers men's basketball team =

American college basketball season

2014–15 Memphis Tigers men's basketball
- Conference: American Athletic Conference
- Record: 18–14 (10–8 The American)
- Head coach: Josh Pastner (6th season)
- Assistant coaches: Robert Kirby; Aki Collins; Keelon Lawson
- Home arena: FedExForum

2014–15 American Athletic Conference men's basketball standings
	Conf.				Overall
Team	W		L	PCT	W		L	PCT
No. 18 SMU †	15	–	3	.833	27	–	7	.794
Tulsa	14	–	4	.778	23	–	11	.676
Temple	13	–	5	.722	26	–	11	.703
Cincinnati	13	–	5	.722	23	–	11	.676
UConn	10	–	8	.556	20	–	15	.571
Memphis	10	–	8	.556	18	–	14	.563
Tulane	6	–	12	.333	15	–	16	.484
East Carolina	6	–	12	.333	14	–	19	.424
UCF	5	–	13	.278	12	–	18	.400
Houston	4	–	14	.222	13	–	19	.406
South Florida	3	–	15	.167	9	–	23	.281
† The American Tournament winner Rankings from AP poll

The 2014–15 Memphis Tigers men's basketball team represented the University of Memphis in the 2014–15 NCAA Division I men's basketball season, the 94th season of Tiger basketball. The Tigers, led by sixth year head coach Josh Pastner, played their home games at the FedExForum. The 2014–15 season was the second season the Tigers participated in the American Athletic Conference. The Tigers didn't play in a postseason tournament, the first time in 15 years.

== Previous season ==
The 2013–14 Memphis Tigers finished the season with an overall record of 24–10 and 12–6 in AAC play to finish in a three-way tie for third place in conference. They lost in the quarterfinals of the AAC tournament to eventual national champion UConn. They received an at-large bid to the NCAA tournament's East Region as an 8 seed where they defeated 9 seed George Washington in the second round before losing in the third round to 1 seed Virginia.

== Off-season ==
=== Departures ===
Name	Pos.	Height	Weight	Year	Hometown	Notes
Chris Crawford	G	6' 3"	222	Senior	Memphis, TN	Graduated
Michael Dixon	G	6' 1"	190	Senior	Kansas City, MO	Graduated
Joe Jackson	G	6' 0"	174	Senior	Memphis, TN	Graduated
Geron Johnson	G	6' 3"	203	Senior	Dayton, OH	Graduated
David Pellom	F	6' 8"	220	Senior	Wilmington, NC	Graduated
Damien Wilson	G/F	6' 5"	195	Junior	Atlanta, GA	Transfer to Kennesaw State
Dominic Woodson	C	6' 10"	300	Sophomore	Round Rock, TX	Transfer to Tennessee

=== Transfers ===
Name	Pos.	Height	Weight	Year	Hometown	Notes
Calvin Godfrey	F	6' 8"	233	Senior	Milwaukee, WI	Transfer from Southern University
Kedren Johnson	G	6' 4"	229	Junior	Lewisburg, TN	Transfer from Vanderbilt University

=== Recruiting ===
College recruiting information
Name	Hometown	School	Height	Weight	Commit date
Dominic Magee point guard	Gretna, LA	Helen Cox High School	6 ft 3 in (1.91 m)	175 lb (79 kg)	Sep 8, 2013
Dominic Magee point guard	Recruit ratings: Scout: Rivals: 247Sports: (84)				
Chris Hawkins; Small forward	Memphis, TN	Southwest Tennessee Community College	6 ft 5 in (1.96 m)	240 lb (110 kg)	Nov 13, 2013
Chris Hawkins; Small forward	Recruit ratings: Scout: Rivals: 247Sports: (JC)				
Trahson Burrell; Small forward	Albany, NY	Lee College	6 ft 7 in (2.01 m)	180 lb (82 kg)	Nov 13, 2013
Trahson Burrell; Small forward	Recruit ratings: Scout: Rivals: 247Sports: (JC)				
Avery Woodson; Shooting guard	Waynesboro, MS	East Mississippi Community College	6 ft 3 in (1.91 m)	195 lb (88 kg)	Nov 13, 2013
Avery Woodson; Shooting guard	Recruit ratings: Scout: Rivals: 247Sports: (JC)				
Overall recruit ranking:
Note: In many cases, Scout, Rivals, 247Sports, On3, and ESPN may conflict in their listings of height and weight.; In these cases, the average was taken. ESPN grades are on a 100-point scale.; Sources: "2014 Team Ranking". Rivals.

== Season summary ==
The Tigers entered the 2014–15 season with only one senior, incoming transfer Calvin Godfrey. The young Tigers toured Canada in August 2014 and were thus permitted extra practice time. The Tigers faced teams from the University of Ottawa, Carleton University, and McGill University on the trip in exhibition matches. Immediately before the Canadian tour, guard/forward Damien Wilson then center Dominic Woodson successively announced that they were transferring away from Memphis. However, upon the team's return from Canada, former Vanderbilt point guard Kedren Johnson announced his intention to transfer to Memphis.

At the AAC media day on October 29, Memphis was picked to finish third in the league behind UConn and SMU. Shaq Goodwin and Austin Nichols were both named to the preseason all-AAC first team.

The Tigers lost their sole exhibition game against Division 2 Christian Brothers, marking the first exhibition game loss for the team since 1996. On November 24, after the team's second game of the season, true freshman point guard Dominic Magee announced his intent to transfer. Magee did not any playing time for the Tigers before his transfer. The Tigers dropped 4 of their first 7 games of the year, starting the year with their worst record since 2000.

On January 6, sophomore Kuran Iverson was suspended for the team's next two games against SMU and Houston, marking Iverson's second suspension of the season. After his suspension and subsequent actions, including using Twitter to make negative statements about Coach Pastner, it was reported that Iverson was not expected to return to the team and the university subsequently announced Iverson's dismissal from the basketball program. Junior forward Trahson Burrell was suspended for the team's January 8 game against SMU, reportedly in part for supporting Iverson's actions prior to his suspension.

On February 7 against Temple, Austin Nichols injured his ankle and had to be helped off the floor. The Tigers went on to lose the game without Nichols, who was later diagnosed with a moderately sprained ankle which was expected to prevent him from playing for the next two weeks. However, Nichols was able to return on February 19 at home against UConn before injuring the ankle again on February 28 early in the second half against Tulsa. The second ankle injury caused Nichols to miss the remainder of the season. Despite his injury and subsequent absence, Nichols finished the season with 93 blocks, the 5th highest single season block total all time for a Tiger.

The Tigers finished the regular season in 5th place in the American. Austin Nichols was named to the All-AAC first team. In the AAC tournament, the Tigers lost their opening matchup to 4 seed Temple.

== Roster ==
2014–15 Memphis Tigers men's basketball team
Players
Coaches

Pos.	#	Name	Height	Weight	Year	Hometown
F	11	Chris Hawkins	6 ft 6 in (1.98 m)	230 lb (104 kg)	Jr	Chicago, Illinois
F	0	Trahson Burrell	6 ft 7 in (2.01 m)	200 lb (91 kg)	Jr	Albany, New York
G	20	Avery Woodson	6 ft 2 in (1.88 m)	196 lb (89 kg)	So	Waynesboro, Mississippi
F	2	Shaq Goodwin	6 ft 9 in (2.06 m)	228 lb (103 kg)	Jr	Atlanta, Georgia
F	4	Austin Nichols	6 ft 8 in (2.03 m)	228 lb (103 kg)	So	Eads, Tennessee
F	5	Nick King	6 ft 7 in (2.01 m)	226 lb (103 kg)	So	Memphis, Tennessee
G	1	Markel Crawford	6 ft 4 in (1.93 m)	197 lb (89 kg)	RS Fr	Memphis, Tennessee
G	3	Pookie Powell	6 ft 1 in (1.85 m)	180 lb (82 kg)	So	Orlando, Florida
F	23	Kuran Iverson (S)	6 ft 9 in (2.06 m)	205 lb (93 kg)	So	Windsor, Connecticut
F	40	Calvin Godfrey	6 ft 8 in (2.03 m)	233 lb (106 kg)	Sr	Milwaukee, Wisconsin
G	15	Kedren Johnson	6 ft 4 in (1.93 m)	229 lb (104 kg)	Jr	Lewisburg, Tennessee
G/F	42	Jake McDowell (W)	6 ft 5 in (1.96 m)	211 lb (96 kg)	So	Memphis, Tennessee
G	14	Jordan Manse (W)	6 ft 1 in (1.85 m)	167 lb (76 kg)	Fr	Austin, Texas
G	12	D'Marnier Cunningham (W)	5 ft 9 in (1.75 m)	160 lb (73 kg)	Jr	Chicago, Illinois

Head coach

- Josh Pastner (Arizona)

Assistant coach(es)

- Robert Kirby (Texas–Pan American)
- David "Aki" Collins (Clark Atlanta)
- Keelon Lawson (Union (TN))

Legend

- (C) Team captain
- (S) Suspended
- (I) Ineligible
- (W) Walk-on
- Injured
- Current redshirt

Roster
Last update: 08/14/2014

== Schedule ==
Date time, TV	Rank^{#}	Opponent^{#}	Result	Record	Site (attendance) city, state
Exhibition
11/12/2014*; 7:00 pm		Christian Brothers	L 70–74 ^{OT}		FedEx Forum; Memphis, TN
Regular season
11/18/2014*; 1:00 pm, ESPN		vs. No. 11 Wichita State; ESPN College Hoops Tip-Off Marathon	L 56–71	0–1	Sanford Pentagon (3,250); Sioux Falls, SD
11/24/2014*; 7:00 pm, ESPN3		Prairie View A&M; Las Vegas Invitational	W 77–49	1–1	Fedex Forum (14,412); Memphis, TN
11/27/2014*; 11:00 pm, FS1		vs. Baylor; Las Vegas Invitational semifinals	L 47–71	1–2	Orleans Arena (N/A); Paradise, NV
11/28/2014*; 7:00 pm, FS1		vs. Indiana State; Las Vegas Invitational 3rd Place Game	W 72–62	2–2	Orleans Arena (N/A); Paradise, NV
12/02/2014*; 6:00 pm, ESPNews		Stephen F. Austin; Las Vegas Invitational	L 52–64	2–3	Fedex Forum (13,201); Memphis, TN
12/06/2014*; 8:30 pm, ESPNU		Bradley	W 73–45	3–3	Fedex Forum (13,807); Memphis, TN
12/13/2014*; 5:00 pm, ESPN2		Oklahoma State	L 55–73	3–4	FedEx Forum (14,501); Memphis, TN
12/15/2014*; 7:00 pm, ESPN3		NC Central	W 81–47	4–4	Fedex Forum (13,126); Memphis, TN
12/17/2014*; 7:00 pm, ESPN3		USC Upstate	W 83–73	5–4	FedEx Forum (13,020); Memphis, TN
12/20/2014*; 2:00 pm, CBSSN		Oral Roberts	W 78–63	6–4	FedEx Forum (13,084); Memphis, TN
12/23/2014*; 7:00 pm, ESPN3		Western Illinois	W 78–51	7–4	FedEx Forum (12,995); Memphis, TN
12/31/2014; 1:00 pm, ESPNU		Houston	W 73–54	8–4 (1–0)	FedEx Forum (13,415); Memphis, TN
01/03/2015; 5:00 pm, ESPNU		Tulane	L 66–74	8–5 (1–1)	FedEx Forum (13,914); Memphis, TN
01/08/2015; 8:00 pm, ESPN2		at SMU	L 59–73	8–6 (1–2)	Moody Coliseum (6,807); Dallas, TX
01/11/2015; 3:00 pm, CBSSN		at Houston	W 62–44	9–6 (2–2)	Hofheinz Pavilion (2,697); Houston, TX
01/15/2015; 6:00 pm, ESPN		Cincinnati	W 63–50	10–6 (3–2)	FedEx Forum (14,916); Memphis, TN
01/17/2015; 1:00 pm, ESPNews		UCF	W 99–79	11–6 (4–2)	FedEx Forum (14,027); Memphis, TN
01/21/2015; 6:00 pm, ESPNU		at Tulsa	L 55–73	11–7 (4–3)	Reynolds Center (5,303); Tulsa, OK
01/24/2015; 7:00 pm, ESPNU		Tulane	W 57–55	12–7 (5–3)	Smoothie King Center (3,109); New Orleans, LA
01/28/2015; 8:00 pm, CBSSN		East Carolina	W 70–58	13–7 (6–3)	FedEx Forum (13,335); Memphis, TN
01/31/2015*; 9:00 pm, ESPN2		at No. 3 Gonzaga	L 64–82	13–8	McCarthey Athletic Center (6,000); Spokane, WA
02/04/2015*; 7:00 pm, ESPN3		Jacksonville State	W 74–48	14–8	FedEx Forum (13,385); Memphis, TN
02/07/2015; 12:00 pm, ESPNews		Temple	L 60–61	14–9 (6–4)	FedEx Forum (14,381); Memphis, TN
02/10/2015; 6:00 pm, ESPNU		at East Carolina	L 53–64	14–10 (6–5)	Williams Arena (4,519); Greenville, NC
02/14/2015; 11:00 am, ESPNU		at South Florida	W 75–48	15–10 (7–5)	USF Sun Dome (3,288); Tampa, FL
02/19/2015; 8:00 pm, ESPN/ESPN2		UConn	W 75–72	16–10 (8–5)	FedEx Forum (14,652); Memphis, TN
02/22/2015; 1:00 pm, CBSSN		at UCF	W 75–65 ^{OT}	17–10 (9–5)	CFE Arena (4,543); Orlando, FL
02/26/2015; 8:00 pm, ESPN/ESPN2		No. 21 SMU	L 57–66	17–11 (9–6)	FedEx Forum (14,523); Memphis, TN
02/28/2015; 7:00 pm, ESPNU		Tulsa	L 72–74 ^{OT}	17–12 (9–7)	FedEx Forum (15,784); Memphis, TN
03/05/2015; 8:00 pm, ESPN2		at UConn	W 54–53	18–12 (10–7)	Gampel Pavilion (10,167); Storrs, CT
03/08/2015; 11:00 am, CBS		at Cincinnati	L 65–77	18–13 (10–8)	Fifth Third Arena (12,358); Cincinnati, OH
American Athletic Conference tournament
03/13/2015; 1:00 pm, ESPN2		vs. Temple; AAC Quarterfinal	L 75–80	18–14	XL Center; Hartford, CT
*Non-conference game. ^{#}Rankings from AP Poll. (#) Tournament seedings in parentheses. All times are in Central Time.
