= 2014–15 Tulane Green Wave men's basketball team =

American college basketball season

2014–15 Tulane Green Wave men's basketball
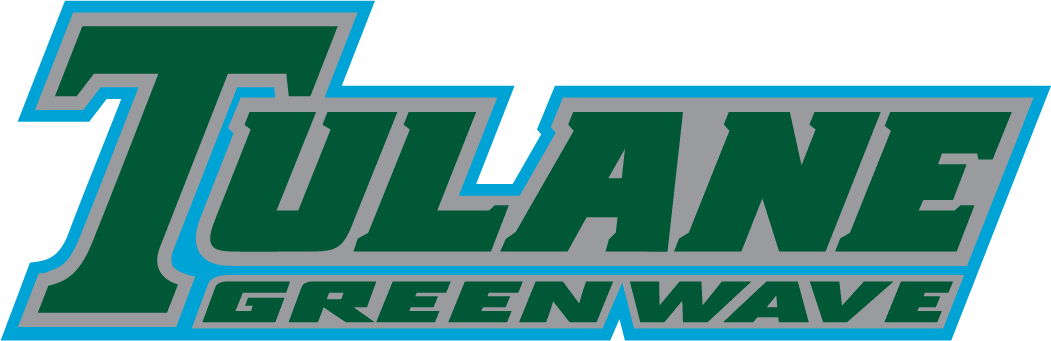
- Conference: American Athletic Conference
- Record: 15–16 (6–12 The American)
- Head coach: Ed Conroy (5th season)
- Assistant coaches: Shammond Williams; Quannas White; Anthony Wilkins
- Home arena: Devlin Fieldhouse

2014–15 American Athletic Conference men's basketball standings
	Conf.				Overall
Team	W		L	PCT	W		L	PCT
No. 18 SMU †	15	–	3	.833	27	–	7	.794
Tulsa	14	–	4	.778	23	–	11	.676
Temple	13	–	5	.722	26	–	11	.703
Cincinnati	13	–	5	.722	23	–	11	.676
UConn	10	–	8	.556	20	–	15	.571
Memphis	10	–	8	.556	18	–	14	.563
Tulane	6	–	12	.333	15	–	16	.484
East Carolina	6	–	12	.333	14	–	19	.424
UCF	5	–	13	.278	12	–	18	.400
Houston	4	–	14	.222	13	–	19	.406
South Florida	3	–	15	.167	9	–	23	.281
† The American Tournament winner Rankings from AP poll

The 2014–15 Tulane Green Wave men's basketball team represented Tulane University during the 2014–15 NCAA Division I men's basketball season. The Green Wave, led by fifth year head coach Ed Conroy, played their home games at Devlin Fieldhouse and were first years members of the American Athletic Conference. They finished the season 15–16, 6–12 in AAC play to finish in a tie for seventh place. They lost in the first round of the American Athletic tournament to Houston.

== Previous season ==
The Green Wave finished the season 17–17, 8–8 in C-USA play to finish in seventh place. They advanced to the quarterfinals of the C-USA tournament where they lost to Tulsa. They were invited to the College Basketball Invitational where the lost in the first round to Princeton.

== Departures ==
Name	Number	Pos.	Height	Weight	Year	Hometown	Notes
Mikael Herbert	4	F	6'9"	210	Freshman	Uusikaupunki, Finland	Transferred
Cole Currie	10	G	6'3"	185	Freshman	La Crescenta, CA	Transferred to Pacific
Max Keenan	12	G	6'2"	185	Senior	Washington, D.C.	Graduated
Kevin Thomas	20	F	6'9"	225	Senior	Waco, TX	Graduated
Ray Barreno	32	C	6'11"	260	Freshman	Ascension Chihuahua, Mexico	Transferred to New Mexico Junior College
Tomas Bruha	41	C	7'0"	235	RS Senior	Prague, Czech Republic	Graduated

=== Incoming transfers ===
Name	Number	Pos.	Height	Weight	Year	Hometown	Previous School
Malik Morgan	13	G	6'4"	199	Junior	River Ridge, LA	Transferred from LSU. Under NCAA transfer rules, Morgan will have to redshirt for the 2014–15 season. Will have two years of remaining eligibility.
Aaron Liberman	31	C/F	6'10"	215	RS Sophomore	Los Angeles, CA	Transferred from Northwestern. Under NCAA transfer rules, Liberman will have to redshirt for the 2014–15 season. Will have three years of remaining eligibility.

== Incoming recruits ==
College recruiting information
Name	Hometown	School	Height	Weight	Commit date
Keith Pinckney; PG	Lithonia, GA	Miller Grove High School	6 ft 1 in (1.85 m)	165 lb (75 kg)	Nov 3, 2013
Keith Pinckney; PG	Recruit ratings: Scout: Rivals: (75)				
Dylan Osetkowski; C	San Juan Capistrano, CA	JSerra Catholic High School	6 ft 9 in (2.06 m)	240 lb (110 kg)	N/A
Dylan Osetkowski; C	Recruit ratings: Scout: Rivals: (67)				
Stanley Roberts, Jr. PF	Palos Verdes, CA	Peninsula High School	6 ft 8 in (2.03 m)	235 lb (107 kg)	N/A
Stanley Roberts, Jr. PF	Recruit ratings: Scout: Rivals: (65)				
Overall recruit ranking:
Note: In many cases, Scout, Rivals, 247Sports, On3, and ESPN may conflict in their listings of height and weight.; In these cases, the average was taken. ESPN grades are on a 100-point scale.; Sources: "2014 Team Ranking". Rivals.

== Roster ==
2014–15 Tulane Green Wave men's basketball team
Players
Coaches
}

Pos.	#	Name	Height	Weight	Year	Previous school	Hometown
G	0	Louis Dabney	6 ft 3 in (1.91 m)	210 lb (95 kg)	Jr	Riverside Academy	New Orleans, LA
G	1	Keith Pinckney	6 ft 2 in (1.88 m)	185 lb (84 kg)	Fr	Miller Grove HS	Lithonia, GA
G	2	Jonathan Stark	6 ft 0 in (1.83 m)	170 lb (77 kg)	So	Munford HS	Munford, TN
G	3	Kajon Stark	6 ft 3 in (1.91 m)	185 lb (84 kg)	RS So	Juniper Serra HS	Los Angeles, CA
G	4	Riley Conroy (W)	5 ft 11 in (1.8 m)	175 lb (79 kg)	Fr	Jesuit HS	New Orleans, LA
G	5	Cameron Reynolds	6 ft 6 in (1.98 m)	195 lb (88 kg)	So	Pearland HS	Perland, TX
G/F	11	Josh Hearlihy	6 ft 8 in (2.03 m)	213 lb (97 kg)	So	JSerra Catholic HS	Los Angeles, CA
G	13	Malik Morgan (redshirt)	6 ft 4 in (1.93 m)	205 lb (93 kg)	Jr	LSU; John Curtis HS	River Ridge, LA
C	15	Ryan Smith	6 ft 11 in (2.11 m)	250 lb (113 kg)	So	Lutheran HS	Wildomar, CA
C	21	Dylan Osetkowski	6 ft 9 in (2.06 m)	255 lb (116 kg)	Fr	JSerra Catholic HS	San Juan Capistrano, CA
C	23	Aaron Liberman (redshirt)	6 ft 10 in (2.08 m)	218 lb (99 kg)	So	Northwestern; Valley Torah HS	North Hollywood, CA
G	24	Jay Hook	6 ft 4 in (1.93 m)	180 lb (82 kg)	Sr	Midway HS	Waco, TX
F	25	Payton Henson	6 ft 8 in (2.03 m)	215 lb (98 kg)	So	Siloam Springs HS	Siloam Springs, AR
F	32	Stanley Roberts, Jr.	6 ft 8 in (2.03 m)	250 lb (113 kg)	Fr	Palos Verdes Peninsula HS	Rolling Hills Estates, CA
F	34	Tre Drye	6 ft 6 in (1.98 m)	225 lb (102 kg)	Sr	Glen Oaks HS	Baton Rouge, LA

Head coach

- Ed Conroy (The Citadel)

Assistant coach(es)

- Quannas White (Oklahoma)
- Shammond Williams (North Carolina)
- Anthony Wilkins (Kent State)

Legend

- (C) Team captain
- (S) Suspended
- (I) Ineligible
- (W) Walk-on
- Injured
- Current redshirt

Roster

== Schedule ==
Date time, TV	Rank^{#}	Opponent^{#}	Result	Record	Site (attendance) city, state
Exhibition
11/12/2014*; 7:00 pm		Loyola (New Orleans)	W 87–43		Devlin Fieldhouse (812); New Orleans, LA
Non-conference regular season
11/17/2014*; 7:00 pm, ESPN3		Wake Forest	L 49–71	0–1	Devlin Fieldhouse (1,922); New Orleans, LA
11/20/2014*; 7:00 pm, ESPN3		Mississippi Valley State	W 100–61	1–1	Devlin Fieldhouse (731); New Orleans, LA
11/22/2014*; 7:00 pm		Southern (New Orleans); Tulane Tournament	W 89–45	2–1	Devlin Fieldhouse (463); New Orleans, LA
11/25/2014*; 7:00 pm, ESPN3		Southern	W 74–59	3–1	Devlin Fieldhouse (556); New Orleans, LA
11/28/2014*; 7:00 pm, ESPN3		Southeastern Louisiana; Tulane Tournament	W 71–61	4–1	Devlin Fieldhouse (983); New Orleans, LA
11/30/2014*; 1:00 pm, ESPN3		Tennessee Tech; Tulane Tournament	W 73–68	5–1	Devlin Fieldhouse (912); New Orleans, LA
12/03/2014*; 7:00 pm		at Loyola–Chicago	W 83–70	6–1	Joseph J. Gentile Arena (1,378); Chicago, IL
12/06/2014*; 1:00 pm, ESPN3		Mississippi State	W 59–54	7–1	Devlin Fieldhouse (1,483); New Orleans, LA
12/16/2014*; 7:00 pm, ESPN3		Savannah State	W 75–67	8–1	Devlin Fieldhouse (1,003); New Orleans, LA
12/19/2014*; 1:00 pm, ESPN3		Jackson State	W 56–49	9–1	Devlin Fieldhouse (1,804); New Orleans, LA
12/22/2014*; 10:00 pm, P12N		at No. 13 Washington	L 57–66	9–2	Alaska Airlines Arena (7,130); Seattle, WA
12/28/2014*; 11:00 am, FS1		vs. No. 17 St. John's; Brooklyn Hoops Winter Festival	L 57–82	9–3	Barclays Center (6,032); Brooklyn, NY
Conference regular season
12/31/2014; 11:00 am, ESPNews		at East Carolina	W 67–59	10–3 (1–0)	Williams Arena (4,358); Greenville, NC
01/03/2015; 5:00 pm, ESPNU		at Memphis	W 74–66	11–3 (2–0)	FedEx Forum (13,914); Memphis, TN
01/07/2015; 6:00 pm, ESPNews		Temple	L 56–64	11–4 (2–1)	Devlin Fieldhouse (2,875); New Orleans, LA
01/11/2015; 2:00 pm, ESPN3		South Florida	W 56–51 ^{OT}	12–4 (3–1)	Devlin Fieldhouse (1,977); New Orleans, LA
01/14/2015; 6:00 pm, ESPN3		at UCF	L 100–103 ^{3OT}	12–5 (3–2)	CFE Arena (4,503); Orlando, FL
01/17/2015; 11:00 am, ESPNews		at Houston	W 68–65	13–5 (4–2)	Hofheinz Pavilion (2,547); Houston, TX
01/21/2015; 8:00 pm, CBSSN		SMU	L 52–66	13–6 (4–3)	Devlin Fieldhouse (3,115); New Orleans, LA
01/24/2015; 7:00 pm, ESPNU		Memphis	L 55–57	13–7 (4–4)	Smoothie King Center (3,109); New Orleans, LA
01/27/2015; 6:00 pm, ESPNews		Tulsa	L 55–62	13–8 (4–5)	Devlin Fieldhouse (2,365); New Orleans, LA
01/31/2015; 11:00 am, CBSSN		at Temple	W 35–27	13–9 (4–6)	Liacouras Center (7,254); Philadelphia, PA
02/07/2015; 5:00 pm, CBSSN		UConn	L 52–63	13–10 (4–7)	Devlin Fieldhouse (3,548); New Orleans, LA
02/14/2015; 1:00 pm, ESPNU		at Cincinnati	W 50–49	14–10 (5–7)	Fifth Third Arena (12,041); Cincinnati, OH
02/19/2015; 6:00 pm, ESPNews		UCF	L 55–69	14–11 (5–8)	Devlin Fieldhouse (2,021); New Orleans, LA
02/22/2015; 3:00 pm, CBSSN		at UConn	W 67–60	14–12 (5–9)	Gampel Pavilion (9,212); Storrs, CT
02/25/2015; 7:00 pm, ESPNews		at Tulsa	L 55–76	14–13 (5–10)	Reynolds Center (4,603); Tulsa, OK
02/28/2015; 1:00 pm, ESPNews		Cincinnati	L 47–63	14–14 (5–11)	Devlin Fieldhouse (2,430); New Orleans, LA
03/04/2015; 7:00 pm, ESPNews		Houston	L 63-68 ^{OT}	14–15 (5–12)	Devlin Fieldhouse (2,041); New Orleans, LA
03/07/2015; 3:00 pm, ESPNews		at South Florida	W 67-63	15–15 (6–12)	USF Sun Dome (3,163); Tampa, FL
2015 American Athletic Conference tournament
03/12/2015; 5:00 pm, ESPNews		vs. Houston; First Round	L 60–66	15–16	XL Center; Hartford, CT
*Non-conference game. ^{#}Rankings from AP Poll. (#) Tournament seedings in parentheses. All times are in Central Time.
