= 2014–15 Houston Cougars men's basketball team =

American college basketball season

2014–15 Houston Cougars men's basketball
- Conference: American Athletic Conference
- Record: 13–19 (4–14 The American)
- Head coach: Kelvin Sampson (1st season)
- Assistant coaches: Alvin Brooks; Talvin Hester; Kellen Sampson
- Home arena: Hofheinz Pavilion

2014–15 American Athletic Conference men's basketball standings
	Conf.				Overall
Team	W		L	PCT	W		L	PCT
No. 18 SMU †	15	–	3	.833	27	–	7	.794
Tulsa	14	–	4	.778	23	–	11	.676
Temple	13	–	5	.722	26	–	11	.703
Cincinnati	13	–	5	.722	23	–	11	.676
UConn	10	–	8	.556	20	–	15	.571
Memphis	10	–	8	.556	18	–	14	.563
Tulane	6	–	12	.333	15	–	16	.484
East Carolina	6	–	12	.333	14	–	19	.424
UCF	5	–	13	.278	12	–	18	.400
Houston	4	–	14	.222	13	–	19	.406
South Florida	3	–	15	.167	9	–	23	.281
† The American Tournament winner Rankings from AP poll

The 2014–15 Houston Cougars men's basketball team represented the University of Houston during the 2014–15 NCAA Division I men's basketball season. It was their first season under head coach Kelvin Sampson and second as members of the American Athletic Conference. The Cougars’ home arena was the on-campus Hofheinz Pavilion. Their record was 13–19, and 4–14 in conference play to finish in tenth place. They advanced to the quarterfinals of the 2015 American Conference tournament, where they lost to Tulsa.

== Pre-season ==
=== Departures ===
Name	Number	Pos.	Height	Weight	Year	Hometown	Notes
Brandon Morris	2	G	6'0"	185	Senior	Alexandria, Louisiana	Graduated
Jaaron Simmons	3	G	6'1"	175	Freshman	Dayton, Ohio	Requested release to move closer to home; transferred to Ohio
Jimmy Jones	12	G	5'10"	160	Senior	Plano, Texas	Graduated
Tione Womack	14	G	6'1"	170	Senior	Baltimore, Maryland	Graduated
Danuel House	23	G	6'7"	195	Sophomore	Sugar Land, Texas	Requested release after resignation of former head coach James Dickey; transferred to Texas A&M
Lawrence Paye	24	G	6'0"	185	Senior	Houston, Texas	Graduated
TaShawn Thomas	35	F	6'8"	215	Junior	Killeen, Texas	Requested release after resignation of former head coach James Dickey; transferred to Oklahoma
Valentine Izundu	45	C	6'10"	215	Sophomore	Houston, Texas	Requested release after resignation of former head coach James Dickey; transferred to Washington St.
J.J. Richardson	55	F	6'8"	245	Senior	Missouri City, Texas	Graduated

=== Returnees ===
Name	Number	Pos.	Height	Weight	Year	Hometown	Notes
Danrad Knowles	0	F	6'10"	195	Sophomore	Nassau, Bahamas	Competed in 31 games as a freshman with 10 starts. Two-time American Rookie of the Week. Third on the team in rebounding. Averaged 7.1 points, 4.3 rebounds and 1.2 blocks per game on 47% shooting.
Mikhail McLean	1	F	6'8"	205	Senior	Nassau, Bahamas	Competed in 28 games as a junior with 16 starts. Averaged 2.6 points and 1.8 rebounds per game on 49% shooting.
LeRon Barnes	4	G	6'6"	190	Junior	Stonewall, Louisiana	Competed in 30 games as a sophomore with 15 starts. Averaged 3.2 points and 2.5 rebounds on 39% shooting.
L.J. Rose	5	G	6'4"	190	Junior	Houston, Texas	Competed in 28 games as a sophomore with 25 starts. Led the American Conference in assists at 5.5 per game. Finished 11th in the conference at 77.8% from the free throw line. Scored 8.5 points with 2.5 rebounds per game on 40% shooting.
Adam Drexler	20	F	6'5"	205	Junior	Houston, Texas	Redshirted last season after transferring from Loyola Marymount.
Jherrod Stiggers	21	G	6'5"	210	Junior	Terrell, Texas	Competed in 33 games as a sophomore with 9 starts. Finished as the third leading scorer with 11.2 points per game. Ranked 3rd in the American Conference with 2.4 three-pointers per game. Also averaged 2.5 rebounds and 1.1 assists per game on 39% shooting.

=== Incoming transfers ===
Name	Number	Pos.	Height	Weight	Year	Hometown	Notes
Ronnie Johnson		G	5'10"	160	Sophomore	Indianapolis, Indiana	Transferred from Purdue; will sit out the 2014–15 season

=== Class of 2014 signees ===
College recruiting information
Name	Hometown	School	Height	Weight	Commit date
Cavon Baker; PG	Queens, NY	Lee College	6 ft 2 in (1.88 m)	185 lb (84 kg)	Apr 30, 2014
Cavon Baker; PG	Recruit ratings: Scout: Rivals: (NR)				
Egi Gjikondi; PF	Boston, MA	San Jacinto College	6 ft 8 in (2.03 m)	220 lb (100 kg)	May 14, 2014
Egi Gjikondi; PF	Recruit ratings: Scout: Rivals: (NR)				
Torian Graham; SG	Marianna, FL	Chipola Junior College	6 ft 4 in (1.93 m)	200 lb (91 kg)	Apr 20, 2014
Torian Graham; SG	Recruit ratings: Scout: Rivals: (NR)				
Bertrand Nkali; PF	Baytown, TX	Lee College	6 ft 9 in (2.06 m)	220 lb (100 kg)	May 16, 2014
Bertrand Nkali; PF	Recruit ratings: Scout: Rivals: (NR)				
Devonta Pollard; SF	De Kalb, MS	East Mississippi CC	6 ft 8 in (2.03 m)	215 lb (98 kg)	May 21, 2014
Devonta Pollard; SF	Recruit ratings: Scout: Rivals: (NR)				
J.C. Washington; PF	Houston, TX	Yates HS	6 ft 6 in (1.98 m)	210 lb (95 kg)	Nov 22, 2013
J.C. Washington; PF	Recruit ratings: Scout: Rivals: (73)				
Eric Weary; SG	New Orleans, LA	Howard College	6 ft 5 in (1.96 m)	205 lb (93 kg)	Apr 21, 2014
Eric Weary; SG	Recruit ratings: Scout: Rivals: (NR)				
Overall recruit ranking: Scout: NR Rivals: NR ESPN: NR
Note: In many cases, Scout, Rivals, 247Sports, On3, and ESPN may conflict in their listings of height and weight.; In these cases, the average was taken. ESPN grades are on a 100-point scale.; Sources: "Houston Basketball Commitment List". Rivals.; "2014 Houston Basketball Commitment List". Scout.; "ESPN". ESPN.; "Scout.com Team Recruiting Rankings". Scout.; "2014 Team Ranking". Rivals.

=== Injuries ===
In July, both LJ Rose and Mikhail McLean had foot surgery. Each needed three to four months to recover.

== Roster ==
2014–15 Houston Cougars men's basketball team
Players
Coaches

Pos.	#	Name	Height	Weight	Year	Hometown
F	0	Danrad Knowles	6 ft 10 in (2.08 m)	190 lb (86 kg)	RS So	Nassau, Bahamas
F	1	Mikhail McLean	6 ft 6 in (1.98 m)	210 lb (95 kg)	Sr	Nassau, Bahamas
G	3	Cavon Baker	6 ft 1 in (1.85 m)	175 lb (79 kg)	Jr	Queens, NY
G	4	LeRon Barnes	6 ft 5 in (1.96 m)	195 lb (88 kg)	RS Jr	Stonewall, LA
G	5	L. J. Rose	6 ft 3 in (1.91 m)	200 lb (91 kg)	Jr	Houston, TX
F	11	J.C. Washington	6 ft 6 in (1.98 m)	225 lb (102 kg)	Fr	Houston, TX
G	12	Wes VanBeck (W)	6 ft 2 in (1.88 m)	180 lb (82 kg)	Fr	Houston, TX
F	13	Bertrand Nkali	6 ft 8 in (2.03 m)	225 lb (102 kg)	RS So	Bertoua, Cameroon
G	3	Ronnie Johnson	6 ft 0 in (1.83 m)	180 lb (82 kg)	RS So	Indianapolis, IN
F	20	Adam Drexler (W)	6 ft 5 in (1.96 m)	205 lb (93 kg)	Jr	Houston, TX
G	21	Jherrod Stiggers	6 ft 4 in (1.93 m)	215 lb (98 kg)	Jr	Terrell, TX
G	23	Eric Weary Jr.	6 ft 4 in (1.93 m)	210 lb (95 kg)	Jr	New Orleans, LA
F	24	Devonta Pollard	6 ft 8 in (2.03 m)	200 lb (91 kg)	Jr	Porterville, MS

Head coach

- Kelvin Sampson (UNC Pembroke)

Assistant coach(es)

- Alvin Brooks (Lamar)
- Talvin Hester (Texas Wesleyan)
- Kellen Sampson (Oklahoma)

Legend

- (C) Team captain
- (S) Suspended
- (I) Ineligible
- (W) Walk-on
- Injured
- Current redshirt

Roster

== Schedule and results ==
On May 28, the American Athletic Conference announced the format and opponents for the 2014–15 conference schedule. Due to an odd number of conference members and maintaining an 18-game schedule, each team played 8 opponents twice (home and away) and two opponents once (1 home, 1 away). UConn (home) and Temple (away) were the two teams the Cougars played just once this season. On July 18, the team announced participation in the championship pairings of the 2014 Continental Tire Las Vegas Classic, alongside Boise State, Texas Tech, and Loyola–Chicago at the Orleans Arena. Two on-campus games preceded the Las Vegas-hosted games, with one at South Carolina State. In August, ESPN reported that Houston's visit to Harvard for a game on November 25. The remainder of the Cougars' schedule was announced by the American Athletic Conference on August 28.

Date time, TV	Rank^{#}	Opponent^{#}	Result	Record	Site (attendance) city, state
Exhibition
Nov 8*; 12:00 pm		North Alabama	W 108–83	–	Hofheinz Pavilion; Houston, TX
Regular season
Nov 14*; 7:00 pm		at Murray State	W 77–74	1–0	CFSB Center (5,056); Murray, KY
Nov 22*; 7:00 pm, ESPN3		Morgan State	W 72–57	2–0	Hofheinz Pavilion (3,058); Houston, TX
Nov 25*; 6:00 pm		at Harvard	L 63–84	2–1	Lavietes Pavilion (1,423); Cambridge, MA
Dec 4*; 7:00 pm, ESPN3		Texas–Pan American	W 72–58	3–1	Hofheinz Pavilion (1,858); Houston, TX
Dec 6*; 7:00 pm, ESPN3		Abilene Christian	W 71–59	4–1	Hofheinz Pavilion (2,007); Houston, TX
Dec 16*; 7:00 pm, ESPN3		Houston Baptist	W 83–76	5–1	Hofheinz Pavilion (2,016); Houston, TX
Dec 17*; 7:00 pm, ESPN3		Arkansas–Pine Bluff; Las Vegas Classic regional round	L 56–61	5–2	Hofheinz Pavilion (2,082); Houston, TX
Dec 20*; 1:00 pm, ESPN3		South Carolina State; Las Vegas Classic regional round	L 63–71	5–3	Hofheinz Pavilion (1,996); Houston, TX
Dec 22*; 9:30pm		vs. Boise State; Las Vegas Classic semifinals	L 73–75 ^{OT}	5–4	Orleans Arena (N/A); Paradise, NV
Dec 23*; 8:00 pm, FS1		vs. Texas Tech; Las Vegas Classic 3rd place game	W 82–69	6–4	Orleans Arena (N/A); Paradise, NV
Dec 28*; 4:00 pm, ESPN3		Mississippi Valley State	W 80–53	7–4	Hofheinz Pavilion (2,147); Houston, TX
Dec 31; 1:00 pm, ESPNU		at Memphis	L 54–73	7–5 (0–1)	FedEx Forum (13,415); Memphis, TN
Jan 4; 1:00 pm, ESPNews		at Tulsa	L 54–72	7–6 (0–2)	Reynolds Center (4,171); Tulsa, OK
Jan 6; 6:00 pm, ESPNews		UCF	L 78–79 ^{OT}	7–7 (0–3)	Hofheinz Pavilion (2,003); Houston, TX
Jan 11; 3:00 pm, CBSSN		Memphis	L 44–62	7–8 (0–4)	Hofheinz Pavilion (2,697); Houston, TX
Jan 14; 6:00 pm, ESPNU		at East Carolina	L 61–66	7–9 (0–5)	Minges Coliseum (4,368); Greenville, NC
Jan 17; 11:00 am, ESPNews		Tulane	L 65–68	7–10 (0–6)	Hofheinz Pavilion (2,547); Houston, TX
Jan 21; 6:00 pm, ESPNews		at Cincinnati	L 54–67	7–11 (0–7)	Fifth Third Arena (9,815); Cincinnati, OH
Jan 24; 5:00 pm, CBSSN		at SMU	L 59–80	7–12 (0–8)	Moody Coliseum (7,094); Dallas, TX
Jan 28*; 7:00 pm, ESPN3		Rice	W 59–48	8–12	Hofheinz Pavilion (3,465); Houston, TX
Feb 1; 2:00 pm, CBSSN		UConn	W 60–58	9–12 (1–8)	Hofheinz Pavilion (3,498); Houston, TX
Feb 5; 6:00 pm, ESPNews		Tulsa	L 44–57	9–13 (1–9)	Hofheinz Pavilion (2,847); Houston, TX
Feb 12; 8:00 pm, ESPNU		No. 25 SMU	L 69–75	9–14 (1–10)	Hofheinz Pavilion (3,315); Houston, TX
Feb 15; 1:00 pm, ESPN3		at UCF	L 54–56	9–15 (1–11)	CFE Arena (4,269); Orlando, FL
Feb 17; 6:00 pm, ESPNews		at South Florida	L 67–69	9–16 (1–12)	USF Sun Dome (3,128); Tampa, FL
Feb 21; 8:30 pm, ESPNU		Cincinnati	L 53–63	9–17 (1–13)	Hofheinz Pavilion (3,562); Houston, TX
Feb 26; 6:00 pm, CBSSN		at Temple	L 54–66	9–18 (1–14)	Liacouras Center (7,023); Philadelphia, PA
Mar 1; 2:00 pm, ESPN3		South Florida	W 72–55	10–18 (2–14)	Hofheinz Pavilion (2,816); Houston, TX
Mar 4; 7:00 pm, ESPNews		at Tulane	W 68–63 ^{OT}	11–18 (3–14)	Devlin Fieldhouse (2,041); New Orleans, LA
Mar 8; 1:00 pm, ESPNews		East Carolina	W 72–54	12–18 (4–14)	Hofheinz Pavilion (2,879); Houston, TX
American Athletic Conference Tournament
Mar 12; 5:00 pm, ESPNews		vs. Tulane; First Round	W 66–60	13–18	XL Center; Hartford, CT
Mar 13; 7:00 pm, ESPNU		vs. Tulsa; Quarterfinal	L 51–59	13–19	XL Center; Hartford, CT
*Non-conference game. ^{#}Rankings from AP Poll. (#) Tournament seedings in parentheses. All times are in Central Time.
