= 2014–15 Tulsa Golden Hurricane men's basketball team =

American college basketball season

2014–15 Tulsa Golden Hurricane men's basketball

NIT, Second round
- Conference: American Athletic Conference
- Record: 23–11 (14–4 The American)
- Head coach: Frank Haith (1st season)
- Assistant coaches: Tom Abatemarco; Dennis Felton; Dave Leitao
- Home arena: Reynolds Center

2014–15 American Athletic Conference men's basketball standings
| | Conf. | | | | Overall |
| Team | W | | L | PCT | W | | L | PCT |
|---|---|---|---|---|---|---|---|---|
| No. 18 SMU † | 15 | – | 3 | .833 | 27 | – | 7 | .794 |
| Tulsa | 14 | – | 4 | .778 | 23 | – | 11 | .676 |
| Temple | 13 | – | 5 | .722 | 26 | – | 11 | .703 |
| Cincinnati | 13 | – | 5 | .722 | 23 | – | 11 | .676 |
| UConn | 10 | – | 8 | .556 | 20 | – | 15 | .571 |
| Memphis | 10 | – | 8 | .556 | 18 | – | 14 | .563 |
| Tulane | 6 | – | 12 | .333 | 15 | – | 16 | .484 |
| East Carolina | 6 | – | 12 | .333 | 14 | – | 19 | .424 |
| UCF | 5 | – | 13 | .278 | 12 | – | 18 | .400 |
| Houston | 4 | – | 14 | .222 | 13 | – | 19 | .406 |
| South Florida | 3 | – | 15 | .167 | 9 | – | 23 | .281 |
† The American Tournament winner Rankings from AP poll

The 2014–15 Tulsa Golden Hurricane men's basketball team represented the University of Tulsa during the 2014–15 NCAA Division I men's basketball season. The Golden Hurricane, led by first year head coach Frank Haith, played their home games at the Reynolds Center and were members of the American Athletic Conference. They finished the season 23–11, 14–4 in American Athletic play to finish in second place. They advanced to the semifinals of the American Athletic tournament where they lost to UConn. They were invited to the National Invitation Tournament where they defeated William & Mary in the first round before losing in the second round to Murray State.

== Previous season ==
The Golden Hurricane finished the season 21–13, 13–3 in C-USA play, to finish in a four-way tie for the C-USA regular-season championship. They were champions of the C-USA tournament to earn an automatic bid to the NCAA tournament, where they lost in the second round to UCLA.

== Departures ==
| Name | Number | Pos. | Height | Weight | Year | Hometown | Notes |
|---|---|---|---|---|---|---|---|
| Barrett Hunter | 0 | G | 6'0" | 178 | Senior | McLean, VA | Graduated |
| Pat Swilling, Jr. | 2 | G | 6'3" | 225 | Senior | New Orleans, LA | Graduated |
| Riley Kemmer | 4 | F | 6'7" | 207 | Freshman | Wichita, KS | No longer on team roster |
| Time Peete | 5 | G | 6'4" | 205 | Senior | Memphis, TN | Graduated |
| Lew Evans | 12 | F | 6'8" | 230 | Sophomore | Salt Lake City, UT | Transferred to Utah State |

== Recruiting ==
=== Class of 2014 commitments ===
College recruiting information
| Name | Hometown | School | Height | Weight | Commit date |
|---|---|---|---|---|---|
| Keondre Dew; SF | San Bernardino, California | Elev8 Basketball Academy | 6 ft 8 in (2.03 m) | 200 lb (91 kg) | Jul 13, 2014 |
| Keondre Dew; SF | Recruit ratings: Scout: Rivals: (69) | | | | |
| Micah Littlejohn; SF | Mansfield, Texas | Mansfield | 6 ft 5 in (1.96 m) | 180 lb (82 kg) | Sep 28, 2013 |
| Micah Littlejohn; SF | Recruit ratings: Scout: Rivals: (NR) | | | | |
| Petar Rusic; SG | Oakville, Ontario | 22 Feet Academy | 6 ft 3 in (1.91 m) | 190 lb (86 kg) | May 1, 2014 |
| Petar Rusic; SG | Recruit ratings: Scout: Rivals: (NR) | | | | |
Overall recruit ranking:
Note: In many cases, Scout, Rivals, 247Sports, On3, and ESPN may conflict in their listings of height and weight.; In these cases, the average was taken. ESPN grades are on a 100-point scale.; Sources: "Tulsa 2014 Basketball Commitments". Rivals.; "2014 Team Ranking". Rivals.

== Roster ==
2014–15 Tulsa Golden Hurricane men's basketball team
Players
Coaches

| Pos. | # | Name | Height | Weight | Year | Previous school | Hometown |
|---|---|---|---|---|---|---|---|
| G | 1 | Rashad Smith | 6 ft 7 in (2.01 m) | 205 lb (93 kg) | Jr | Plano HS | Plano, TX |
| G | 2 | Cory Haith | 5 ft 11 in (1.8 m) | 175 lb (79 kg) | Jr | University of Missouri | Miami, FL |
| G | 3 | Shaquille Harrison | 6 ft 4 in (1.93 m) | 180 lb (82 kg) | Jr | Lee's Summit | Kansas City, MO |
| G | 5 | Rashad Ray | 5 ft 10 in (1.78 m) | 170 lb (77 kg) | Jr | O. Perry Walker HS | New Orleans, LA |
| G | 10 | James Woodard | 6 ft 3 in (1.91 m) | 183 lb (83 kg) | Jr | Edmond Memorial HS | Arcadia, OK |
| G/F | 11 | Micah Littlejohn | 6 ft 6 in (1.98 m) | 191 lb (87 kg) | Fr | Mansfield HS | Mansfield, TX |
| F | 14 | TK Edogi | 6 ft 8 in (2.03 m) | 215 lb (98 kg) | So | Westwind Prep | Surprise, AZ |
| G/F | 15 | Marquel Curtis | 6 ft 3 in (1.91 m) | 210 lb (95 kg) | RS Jr | Williston State College | Plymouth, MN |
| G | 22 | Nick Wood | 6 ft 1 in (1.85 m) | 170 lb (77 kg) | Jr | Cascia Hall Prep | Tulsa, OK |
| G | 23 | Stevie Repichowski | 6 ft 5 in (1.96 m) | 193 lb (88 kg) | So | Kingdom Prep Academy | Lansing, MI |
| F | 40 | D'Andre Wright | 6 ft 9 in (2.06 m) | 248 lb (112 kg) | Jr | Eisenhower HS | Lawton, OK |
| F | 44 | Brandon Swannegan | 6 ft 9 in (2.06 m) | 207 lb (94 kg) | Jr | Cypress Ridge HS | Houston, TX |
| F | 55 | Emmanuel Ezechinonso | 6 ft 11 in (2.11 m) | 278 lb (126 kg) | RS So | Covenant Christian Ministries Academy | Lagos, Nigeria |

Head coach

- Frank Haith (Elon)

Assistant coach(es)

- Tom Abatemarco (Dowling)
- Dennis Felton (Howard)
- Dave Leitao (Northeastern)

Legend

- (C) Team captain
- (S) Suspended
- (I) Ineligible
- (W) Walk-on
- Injured
- Current redshirt

Roster

== Schedule ==
| Date time, TV | Rank^{#} | Opponent^{#} | Result | Record | Site (attendance) city, state |
Exhibition
| November 8, 2014*; 4:00 pm | | Southwestern Oklahoma State | W 74–50 | | Reynolds Center (3,378); Tulsa, OK |
Non-conference regular season
| November 15, 2014*; 7:00 pm | | at Oral Roberts; MGM Grand Main Event Opening Round/Rivalry | L 68–77 | 0–1 | Mabee Center (6,534); Tulsa, OK |
| November 17, 2014*; 8:30 pm, ESPN3 | | Louisiana–Lafayette; MGM Grand Main Event Opening Round | W 64–53 | 1–1 | Reynolds Center (3,889); Tulsa, OK |
| November 19, 2014*; 7:05 pm, ESPN3 | | Abilene Christian | W 65–39 | 2–1 | Reynolds Center (3,829); Tulsa, OK |
| November 24, 2014*; 10:00 pm, ESPNU | | vs. Auburn; MGM Grand Main Event heavyweight semifinal | W 53–35 | 3–1 | MGM Grand Garden Arena (1,507); Paradise, NV |
| November 26, 2014*; 10:30 pm, ESPN2 | | vs. Oklahoma State; MGM Grand Main Event heavyweight final | L 58–73 | 3–2 | MGM Grand Garden Arena (1,712); Paradise, NV |
| November 29, 2014*; 2:00 pm, ESPN3 | | at No. 9 Wichita State | L 55–75 | 3–3 | Charles Koch Arena (10,506); Wichita, KS |
| December 3, 2014*; 7:00 pm, ESPN3 | | Creighton | W 77–64 | 4–3 | Reynolds Center (4,383); Tulsa, OK |
| December 7, 2014*; 2:00 pm | | at Arkansas–Little Rock | W 78–73 | 5–3 | Jack Stephens Center (794); Little Rock, AR |
| December 10, 2014*; 7:00 pm | | Southeastern Oklahoma State | L 66–69 | 5–4 | Reynolds Center (4,333); Tulsa, OK |
| December 13, 2014*; 1:30 pm, CBSSN | | No. 16 Oklahoma | L 68–87 | 5–5 | Reynolds Center (6,885); Tulsa, OK |
| December 17, 2014*; 7:00 pm, ESPN3 | | Missouri State | W 74–70 | 6–5 | Reynolds Center (4,245); Tulsa, OK |
| December 22, 2014*; 7:00 pm, ESPN3 | | Incarnate Word | W 76–47 | 7–5 | Reynolds Center (4,209); Tulsa, OK |
Conference regular season
| December 31, 2014; 11:00 am, ESPNU | | at UCF | W 56–54 | 8–5 (1–0) | CFE Arena (3,440); Orlando, FL |
| January 4, 2015; 1:00 pm, ESPNews | | Houston | W 72–54 | 9–5 (2–0) | Reynolds Center (4,171); Tulsa, OK |
| January 10, 2015; 2:00 pm, ESPNews | | at Temple | W 63–56 | 10–5 (3–0) | Liacouras Center (6,012); Philadelphia, PA |
| January 13, 2015; 8:30 pm, CBSSN | | UConn | W 66–58 | 11–5 (4–0) | Reynolds Center (6,092); Tulsa, OK |
| January 17, 2015; 10:00 am, ESPNU | | at South Florida | W 75–58 | 12–5 (5–0) | USF Sun Dome (3,165); Tampa, FL |
| January 21, 2015; 6:00 pm, ESPNU | | Memphis | W 73–55 | 13–5 (6–0) | Reynolds Center (5,003); Tulsa, OK |
| January 24, 2015; 11:00 am, ESPNews | | at East Carolina | W 66–64 | 14–5 (7–0) | Williams Arena (4,968); Greenville, NC |
| January 27, 2015; 6:00 pm, ESPNews | | at Tulane | W 62–55 | 15–5 (8–0) | Devlin Fieldhouse (2,365); New Orleans, LA |
| January 31, 2015; 12:00 pm, ESPNews | | South Florida | W 78–71 ^{OT} | 16–5 (9–0) | Reynolds Center (4,939); Tulsa, OK |
| February 5, 2015; 6:00 pm, ESPNews | | at Houston | W 57–44 | 17–5 (10–0) | Hofheinz Pavilion (2,847); Houston, TX |
| February 7, 2015; 7:00 pm, ESPNU | | No. 23 SMU | L 57–68 | 17–6 (10–1) | Reynolds Center (7,677); Tulsa, OK |
| February 12, 2015; 6:00 pm, ESPN2 | | at UConn | L 45–70 | 17–7 (10–2) | XL Center (11,506); Hartford, CT |
| February 18, 2015; 6:00 pm, ESPNU | | East Carolina | W 69–58 | 18–7 (11–2) | Reynolds Center (4,263); Tulsa, OK |
| February 22, 2015; 5:00 pm, ESPNU | | Temple | W 55–39 | 19–7 (12–2) | Reynolds Center (5,130); Tulsa, OK |
| February 25, 2015; 7:00 pm, ESPNews | | Tulane | W 76–55 | 20–7 (13–2) | Reynolds Center (4,603); Tulsa, OK |
| February 28, 2015; 7:00 pm, ESPNU | | at Memphis | W 74–72 ^{OT} | 21–7 (14–2) | FedEx Forum (15,784); Memphis, TN |
| March 4, 2015; 8:00 pm, CBSSN | | Cincinnati | L 47-56 | 21–8 (14–3) | Reynolds Center (5,840); Tulsa, OK |
| March 7, 2015; 2:00 pm, ESPNU | | at SMU | L 62-67 | 21–9 (14–4) | Moody Coliseum (7,314); Dallas, TX |
American Athletic Conference tournament
| March 13, 2015; 6:00 pm, ESPNU | | vs. Houston; Quarterfinals | W 59–51 | 22–9 | XL Center (9,514); Hartford, CT |
| March 14, 2015; 6:00 pm, ESPN2 | | at UConn; Semifinals | L 42–47 | 22–10 | XL Center (10,114); Hartford, CT |
NIT
| March 17, 2015*; 7:15 pm, ESPN3 | No. (2) | (7) William & Mary; First round | W 70–67 | 23–10 | Reynolds Center (2,547); Tulsa, OK |
| March 23, 2015*; 9:00 pm, ESPN | No. (2) | (3) Murray State; Second round | L 62–83 | 23–11 | Reynolds Center (3,440); Tulsa, OK |
*Non-conference game. ^{#}Rankings from AP Poll. (#) Tournament seedings in parentheses. All times are in Central Time. (#) during NIT is seed within region.
