= 2014–15 SMU Mustangs men's basketball team =

American college basketball season

2014–15 SMU Mustangs men's basketball

The American regular season & tournament champions

NCAA tournament, round of 64
- Conference: American Athletic Conference

Ranking
- AP: No. 18
- Record: 27–7 (15–3 The American)
- Head coach: Larry Brown (3rd season)
- Assistant coaches: Tim Jankovich; Ulric Maligi; K. T. Turner
- Home arena: Moody Coliseum

2014–15 American Athletic Conference men's basketball standings
	Conf.				Overall
Team	W		L	PCT	W		L	PCT
No. 18 SMU †	15	–	3	.833	27	–	7	.794
Tulsa	14	–	4	.778	23	–	11	.676
Temple	13	–	5	.722	26	–	11	.703
Cincinnati	13	–	5	.722	23	–	11	.676
UConn	10	–	8	.556	20	–	15	.571
Memphis	10	–	8	.556	18	–	14	.563
Tulane	6	–	12	.333	15	–	16	.484
East Carolina	6	–	12	.333	14	–	19	.424
UCF	5	–	13	.278	12	–	18	.400
Houston	4	–	14	.222	13	–	19	.406
South Florida	3	–	15	.167	9	–	23	.281
† The American Tournament winner Rankings from AP poll

The 2014–15 SMU Mustangs men's basketball team represented Southern Methodist University (SMU) during the 2014–15 NCAA Division I men's basketball season. The Mustangs, led by third year head coach Larry Brown, played their home games on their campus in University Park, Texas at Moody Coliseum. They were members of the American Athletic Conference. They finished the season 27–7, 15–3 in AAC play to win the America Athletic regular season championship. They defeated East Carolina, Temple, and UConn to become champions of the America Athletic tournament. They received an automatic bid to the NCAA tournament where they lost on a controversial goaltending call in the second round to UCLA.

== Off-season ==
=== Departures ===
Name	Number	Pos.	Height	Weight	Year	Hometown	Notes
Shawne Williams	2	G	6'7"	230	RS Senior	Duncanville, Texas	Graduation
Nick Russell	12	G	6'4"	210	RS Senior	Duncanville, Texas	Graduation
Jalen Jones	21	G	6'7"	220	Senior	Dallas, Texas	Elected to transfer to Texas A&M.

=== 2014 recruiting class ===
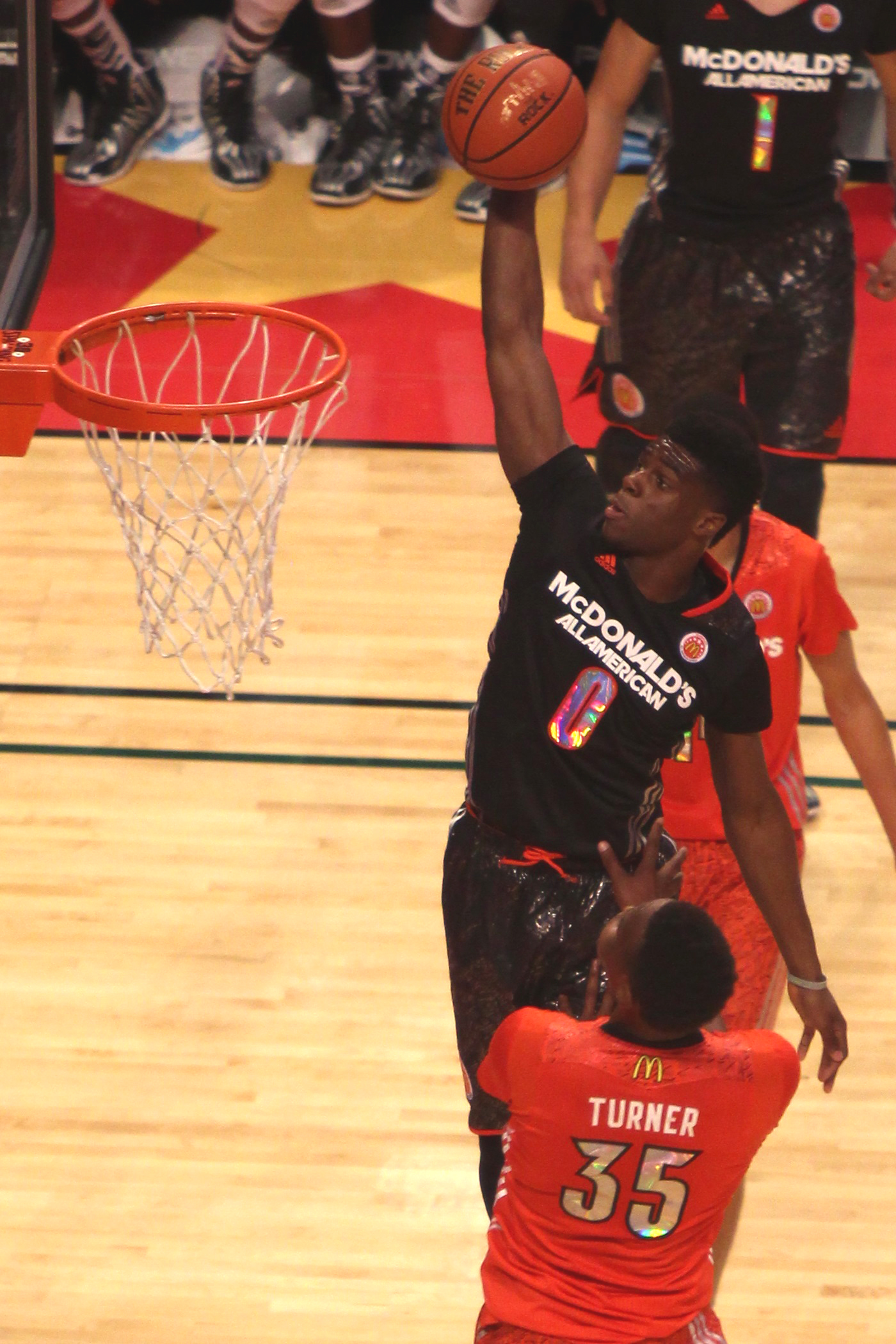
Emmanuel Mudiay in the 2014 McDonald's All-American Boys Game

During the 2014 recruiting season, SMU gained a commitment from Emmanuel Mudiay, a five-star point guard from Dallas. However, he would instead sign a one-year contract reportedly worth $1.2 million to play with the Guangdong Southern Tigers of the Chinese Basketball Association. While Mudiay's family indicated the signing was financially motivated, news reports indicated that he was unlikely to be approved for play by the NCAA's eligibility clearinghouse. His NCAA eligibility difficulties stemmed largely from his two years at Prime Prep Academy in Arlington, Texas—a school that has never had any of its academic courses approved by the NCAA to establish a player's eligibility.

== Roster ==
ֶ

2014–15 SMU Mustangs men's basketball team
Players
Coaches

Pos.	#	Name	Height	Weight	Year	Previous school	Hometown
F	00	Ben Moore	6 ft 8 in (2.03 m)	185 lb (84 kg)	So	Bolingbrook HS	Bolingbrook, Illinois
G	1	Ryan Manuel	6 ft 4 in (1.93 m)	185 lb (84 kg)	Sr	Fort Bend Austin HS	Houston, Texas
C	2	Yanick Moreira	6 ft 11 in (2.11 m)	220 lb (100 kg)	Sr	South Plains College	Luanda, Angola
G	3	Sterling Brown	6 ft 6 in (1.98 m)	200 lb (91 kg)	So	Proviso East HS	Maywood, Illinois
G	4	Keith Frazier	6 ft 5 in (1.96 m)	190 lb (86 kg)	So	Kimball HS	Dallas, Texas
F	5	Markus Kennedy	6 ft 9 in (2.06 m)	260 lb (118 kg)	RS Jr	Brewster Academy	Philadelphia, Pennsylvania
G	10	Kevin Dunleavy	6 ft 3 in (1.91 m)	180 lb (82 kg)	Sr	Delbarton School	New Providence, New Jersey
G	11	Nic Moore	5 ft 9 in (1.75 m)	170 lb (77 kg)	RS Jr	Warsaw Community HS	Winona Lake, Indiana
G	13	Crandall Head	6 ft 4 in (1.93 m)	180 lb (82 kg)	RS Sr	Rich South HS	Matteson, Illinois
C	15	Cannen Cunnigham	6 ft 10 in (2.08 m)	225 lb (102 kg)	Sr	Lamar HS	Arlington, Texas

Head coach

- Larry Brown

Assistant coach(es)

- Tim Jankovich
- Ulric Maligi
- K. T. Turner

Legend

- (C) Team captain
- (S) Suspended
- (I) Ineligible
- (W) Walk-on
- Injured
- Current redshirt

Roster
Last update: 01/28/2015

== Schedule and results ==
Date time, TV	Rank^{#}	Opponent^{#}	Result	Record	Site (attendance) city, state
Non-conference regular season
November 14, 2014*; 8:30 pm, ESPN3	No. 22	Lamar; Hoosiers Showcase	W 93–54	1–0	Moody Coliseum (6,971); Dallas, TX
November 17, 2014*; 10:00 pm, ESPN2	No. 22	at No. 13 Gonzaga; ESPN College Hoops Tip-Off Marathon	L 56–72	1–1	McCarthey Athletic Center (6,000); Spokane, WA
November 20, 2014*; 7:00 pm, BTN	No. 22	at Indiana; Hoosiers Showcase	L 68–74	1–2	Assembly Hall (17,472); Bloomington, IN
November 22, 2014*; 6:00 pm, ESPN3	No. 22	Eastern Washington; Hoosiers Showcase	W 77–68	2–2	Moody Coliseum (6,852); Dallas, TX
November 25, 2014*; 6:30 pm, ESPNews		No. 25 Arkansas	L 72–78	2–3	Moody Coliseum (7,086); Dallas, TX
November 26, 2014*; 7:00 pm, ESPN3		Texas Southern; Hoosiers Showcase	W 72–59	3–3	Moody Coliseum (6,852); Dallas, TX
November 30, 2014*; 6:00 pm, ESPN3		Monmouth	W 63–51	4–3	Moody Coliseum (6,852); Dallas, TX
December 5, 2014*; 6:00 pm, ESPNews		Wyoming	W 66–53	5–3	Moody Coliseum (6,852); Dallas, TX
December 8, 2014*; 7:00 pm, CBSSN		UC Santa Barbara	W 80–73 ^{OT}	6–3	Moody Coliseum (6,852); Dallas, TX
December 17, 2014*; 7:00 pm, CBSSN		UIC	W 67–46	7–3	Moody Coliseum (6,852); Dallas, TX
December 20, 2014*; 11:00 am, ESPN2		at Michigan	W 62–51	8–3	Crisler Center (12,221); Ann Arbor, MI
December 29, 2014*; 7:00 pm, ESPN3		Midwestern State	W 70–61	9–3	Moody Coliseum (6,589); Dallas, TX
Conference regular season
December 31, 2014; 4:00 pm, ESPN2		South Florida	W 83–49	10–3 (1–0)	Moody Coliseum (6,624); Dallas, TX
January 3, 2015; 10:00 am, ESPN2		at Cincinnati	L 50–56	10–4 (1–1)	Fifth Third Arena (10,013); Cincinnati, OH
January 8, 2015; 8:00 pm, ESPN2		Memphis	W 73–59	11–4 (2–1)	Moody Coliseum (6,807); Dallas, TX
January 11, 2015; 1:00 pm, CBSSN		at UCF	W 70–61	12–4 (3–1)	CFE Arena (3,664); Orlando, FL
January 14, 2015; 6:00 pm, CBSSN		at Temple	W 60–55	13–4 (4–1)	Liacouras Center (7,695); Philadelphia, PA
January 17, 2015; 3:00 pm, CBSSN		East Carolina	W 77–54	14–4 (5–1)	Moody Coliseum (7,001); Dallas, TX
January 21, 2015; 8:00 pm, CBSSN		at Tulane	W 66–52	15–4 (6–1)	Devlin Fieldhouse (3,115); New Orleans, LA
January 24, 2015; 5:00 pm, CBSSN		Houston	W 80–59	16–4 (7–1)	Moody Coliseum (7,094); Dallas, TX
January 28, 2015; 6:00 pm, ESPNU		at South Florida	W 63–52	17–4 (8–1)	USF Sun Dome (3,589); Tampa, FL
January 31, 2015; 7:00 pm, ESPNU		UCF	W 75–56	18–4 (9–1)	Moody Coliseum (7,043); Dallas, TX
February 5, 2015; 8:00 pm, ESPN	No. 23	Cincinnati	L 54–62	18–5 (9–2)	Moody Coliseum (7,098); Dallas, TX
February 7, 2015; 7:00 pm, ESPNU	No. 23	at Tulsa	W 68–57	19–5 (10–2)	Reynolds Center (7,677); Tulsa, OK
February 12, 2015; 8:00 pm, ESPNU	No. 25	at Houston	W 75–69	20–5 (11–2)	Hofheinz Pavilion (3,315); Houston, TX
February 14, 2015; 8:00 pm, ESPN	No. 25	UConn; ESPN College GameDay	W 73–55	21–5 (12–2)	Moody Coliseum (7,395); Dallas, TX
February 19, 2015; 6:00 pm, ESPN2	No. 21	Temple	W 67–58	22–5 (13–2)	Moody Coliseum (6,852); Dallas, TX
February 26, 2015; 8:00 pm, ESPN2	No. 21	at Memphis	W 66–57 ^{OT}	23–5 (14–2)	FedEx Forum (14,523); Memphis, TN
March 1, 2015; 1:00 pm, CBS	No. 21	at UConn	L 73–81	23–6 (14–3)	XL Center (15,564); Hartford, CT
March 8, 2015; 2:00 pm, ESPNU	No. 22	Tulsa	W 67–62	24–6 (15–3)	Moody Coliseum (7,314); Dallas, TX
American Athletic Conference tournament
March 13, 2015; 11:00 am, ESPN2	No. 20	vs. East Carolina; Quarterfinals	W 74–68	25–6	XL Center (N/A); Hartford, CT
March 14, 2015; 2:00 pm, ESPN2	No. 20	vs. Temple; Semifinals	W 69–56	26–6	XL Center (10,114); Hartford, CT
March 15, 2015; 2:15 pm, ESPN	No. 20	vs. UConn; Championship game	W 62–54	27–6	XL Center (13,365); Hartford, CT
NCAA tournament
March 19, 2015*; 2:10 pm, truTV	No. 18 (6 S)	vs. (11 S) UCLA; Second round	L 59–60	27–7	KFC Yum! Center (N/A); Louisville, KY
*Non-conference game. ^{#}Rankings from AP Poll. (#) Tournament seedings in parentheses. All times are in Central Time. (#) during NCAA Tournament is seed with Region S=South.

== Rankings ==
Ranking movement Legend: ██ Increase in ranking. ██ Decrease in ranking. (RV) Received votes but unranked. (NR) Not ranked.
Poll	Pre	Wk 2	Wk 3	Wk 4	Wk 5	Wk 6	Wk 7	Wk 8	Wk 9	Wk 10	Wk 11	Wk 12	Wk 13	Wk 14	Wk 15	Wk 16	Wk 17	Wk 18	Post	Final
AP	22	22	NR	NR	NR	NR	NR	NR	NR	RV	RV	RV	23	25	21	21	22	20	18	N/A
Coaches	22	23	RV	NR	NR	NR	NR	NR	NR	RV	RV	RV	23	25	21	21	22	21	19	RV
