= 2015 American Athletic Conference men's basketball tournament =

- Tournament Logo
- Classification: Division I
- Season: 2014–15
- Teams: 11
- Site: XL Center; Hartford, Connecticut
- Champions: SMU (1st title)
- Winning coach: Larry Brown (1st title)
- MVP: Markus Kennedy (SMU)
- Attendance: 45,480
- Television: ESPN, ESPN2, ESPNU, ESPNews

2014–15 American Athletic Conference men's basketball standings
	Conf.				Overall
Team	W		L	PCT	W		L	PCT
No. 18 SMU †	15	–	3	.833	27	–	7	.794
Tulsa	14	–	4	.778	23	–	11	.676
Temple	13	–	5	.722	26	–	11	.703
Cincinnati	13	–	5	.722	23	–	11	.676
UConn	10	–	8	.556	20	–	15	.571
Memphis	10	–	8	.556	18	–	14	.563
Tulane	6	–	12	.333	15	–	16	.484
East Carolina	6	–	12	.333	14	–	19	.424
UCF	5	–	13	.278	12	–	18	.400
Houston	4	–	14	.222	13	–	19	.406
South Florida	3	–	15	.167	9	–	23	.281
† The American Tournament winner Rankings from AP poll

The 2015 American Athletic Conference men's basketball tournament was played from March 12–15, 2015, at the XL Center in Hartford, Connecticut.

== Seeds ==
Teams were seeded by conference record, with a ties broken by record between the tied teams followed by record against the regular-season champion, if necessary. The top five seeds received first round byes.

Seed	School	Conference	Overall	Tiebreaker
1	SMU	15–3	24–6	
2	Tulsa	14–4	21–9	
3	Cincinnati	13–5	22–10	2–0 vs. SMU
4	Temple	13–5	22–9	0–2 vs. SMU
5	Memphis	10–8	19–13	2–0 vs. Connecticut
6	Connecticut	10–8	18–13	0–2 vs. Memphis
7	Tulane	6–12	15–16	1–0 vs. East Carolina
8	East Carolina	6–12	13–18	0–1 vs. Tulane
9	UCF	5–13	12–17	
10	Houston	4–14	13–18	
11	South Florida	3–15	9–23	

== Schedule ==
All tournament games are nationally televised on an ESPN network:

Session	Game	Time*	Matchup^{#}	Television	Attendance
First round – Thursday, March 12
1	1	3:30 pm	#9 UCF 80 vs. #8 East Carolina 81 (OT)	ESPNU	5,431
1	2	6:00 pm	#10 Houston 66 vs. #7 Tulane 60	ESPNews	5,431
1	3	8:00 pm	#11 South Florida 43 vs. #6 Connecticut 69	ESPNews	5,431
Quarterfinals – Friday, March 13
2	4	12:00 pm	#8 East Carolina 68 vs. #1 SMU 74	ESPN2	7,056
2	5	2:00 pm	#5 Memphis 75 vs. #4 Temple 80	ESPN2	7,056
3	6	7:00 pm	#10 Houston 51 vs. #2 Tulsa 59	ESPNU	9,514
3	7	9:00 pm	#6 Connecticut 57 vs. #3 Cincinnati 54	ESPNU	9,514
Semifinals – Saturday, March 14
4	8	3:00 pm	#1 SMU 69 vs. #4 Temple 56	ESPN2	10,114
4	9	5:00 pm	#2 Tulsa 42 vs. #6 Connecticut 47	ESPN2	10,114
Championship – Sunday, March 15
5	10	3:15 pm	#1 SMU 62 vs. #6 Connecticut 54	ESPN	13,365
*Game times in ET. #-Rankings denote tournament seeding.

== Bracket ==
First round Thursday, March 12
8	East Carolina	81*
9	UCF	80
7	Tulane	60
10	Houston	66
6	Connecticut	69
11	South Florida	43

Quarterfinals; Friday, March 13
1	#20 SMU	74
8	East Carolina	68
4	Temple	80
5	Memphis	75
2	Tulsa	59
10	Houston	51
3	Cincinnati	54
6	Connecticut	57

Semifinals; Saturday, March 14
1	#20 SMU	69
4	Temple	56
2	Tulsa	42
6	Connecticut	47

Championship; Sunday, March 15
1	#20 SMU	62
6	Connecticut	54
