= Markus Kennedy =

American basketball player

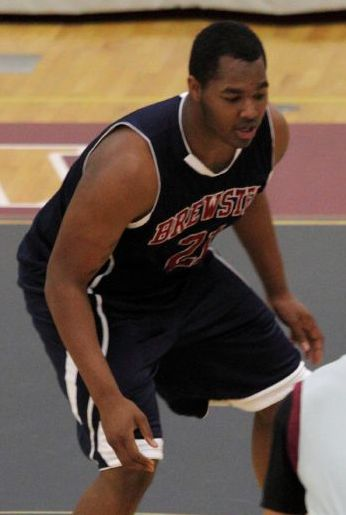
- Kennedy with Brewster Academy in 2011

Personal information
- Born: August 3, 1991 (age 35) Philadelphia, Pennsylvania, U.S.
- Listed height: 6 ft 9 in (2.06 m)
- Listed weight: 244 lb (111 kg)

Career information
- High school: The Winchendon School (Winchendon, Massachusetts); Brewster Academy (Wolfeboro, New Hampshire)
- College: Villanova (2011–2012); SMU (2013–2016)
- NBA draft: 2016: undrafted
- Playing career: 2016–2020
- Position: Power forward

Career history
- 2016–2017: Rio Grande Valley Vipers
- 2017: Pistoia Basket 2000
- 2018: HTV Basket
- 2018: JDA Dijon Basket
- 2018–2019: Socar Petkim S.K.
- 2019–2020: San Severo

Career highlights
- Second-team All-AAC (2015); 2× AAC Sixth Man of the Year (2015, 2016); AAC tournament MVP (2015)

Markus Kennedy (born August 3, 1991) is an American former basketball player. He played college basketball for the Villanova Wildcats and SMU Mustangs.

== College career ==
Kennedy averaged 3.0 points and 4.4 rebounds per game as a freshman at Villanova. After the season he opted to transfer to SMU to play under Larry Brown. As a sophomore, Kennedy averaged 12.4 points, 7.1 rebounds, and 1.5 steals per game. He was suspended for the first semester of his junior season due to poor academic performance. Kennedy averaged 11.9 points and 6.3 rebounds per game as a junior, shooting 54.8 percent from the field. He was named American Athletic Conference Sixth Man of the Year as well as AAC tournament MVP. Kennedy was selected to the Second Team All-AAC. He posted 9.3 points, 6.3 rebounds and 2.2 assists per game as senior.

== Professional career ==
On September 19, 2016, Kennedy signed with Yeşilgiresun Belediye of the Turkish Basketball Super League but did not play for the team. Kennedy spent his first professional season with the Rio Grande Valley Vipers of the NBA Development League and averaged 18 points and 11 rebounds per game over 11 games. On July 22, 2017, he signed with Italian club Pistoia Basket 2000. After averaging 10.9 points and 8.8 rebounds per game, he left the team on December 28. Kennedy agreed to a deal with HTV Basket of the LNB Pro A on January 4, 2018. Kennedy averaged 9 points and 5.2 rebounds per game. On February 27, he signed with JDA Dijon Basket. Kennedy signed a deal with Socar Petkim S.K. of the Turkish Basketball First League on August 14. He joined San Severo in 2019, but his contract was terminated in January 2020.

== The Basketball Tournament ==
Markus Kennedy played for Team Sons of Westwood in the 2018 edition of The Basketball Tournament. In one game, he had five points, one rebound and one assist. Team Sons of Westwood ALS made it to the Super 16 before falling to Team Challenge ALS.
