= 2014–15 UConn Huskies men's basketball team =

American college basketball season

2014–15 UConn Huskies men's basketball

NIT, First round
- Conference: American Athletic Conference
- Record: 20–15 (10–8 The American)
- Head coach: Kevin Ollie (3rd season)
- Assistant coaches: Glen Miller; Karl Hobbs; Ricky Moore
- Home arena: Harry A. Gampel Pavilion; XL Center

2014–15 American Athletic Conference men's basketball standings
	Conf.				Overall
Team	W		L	PCT	W		L	PCT
No. 18 SMU †	15	–	3	.833	27	–	7	.794
Tulsa	14	–	4	.778	23	–	11	.676
Temple	13	–	5	.722	26	–	11	.703
Cincinnati	13	–	5	.722	23	–	11	.676
UConn	10	–	8	.556	20	–	15	.571
Memphis	10	–	8	.556	18	–	14	.563
Tulane	6	–	12	.333	15	–	16	.484
East Carolina	6	–	12	.333	14	–	19	.424
UCF	5	–	13	.278	12	–	18	.400
Houston	4	–	14	.222	13	–	19	.406
South Florida	3	–	15	.167	9	–	23	.281
† The American Tournament winner Rankings from AP poll

The 2014–15 UConn Huskies men's basketball team represented the University of Connecticut in the 2014–15 NCAA Division I men's basketball season. The Huskies were led by third-year head coach Kevin Ollie. The Huskies split their home games between the XL Center in Hartford, Connecticut, and the Harry A. Gampel Pavilion on the UConn campus in Storrs, Connecticut. The Huskies were members of the American Athletic Conference. They finished the season 20–15, 10–8 in AAC play to finish in a tie for fifth place. They advanced to the championship game of the American Athletic tournament where they lost to SMU.

UConn was invited to the National Invitation Tournament where they lost in the first round to Arizona State 68–61.

== Previous season ==
The Huskies finished the 2013–14 season with a record of 32–8 overall, including 12–6 in American Athletic play. They lost in the championship game of the 2014 American Athletic Conference men's basketball tournament to Louisville. They received at-large bid to the 2014 NCAA Men's Division I Basketball Tournament which they beat Saint Joseph's and Villanova in the second and third rounds, Iowa State and Michigan State in the sweet sixteen and elite eight to make it to the final four, where they beat the Florida Gators in the national semifinal round and the Kentucky Wildcats in the 2014 National Championship Game. Shabazz Napier was named the tournament's MOP.

== Departures ==
Name	Number	Pos.	Height	Weight	Year	Hometown	Notes
DeAndre Daniels	2	F	6'9"	195	Junior	Los Angeles, CA	Declare to 2014 NBA draft
Niels Giffey	5	G/F	6'7"	205	Senior	Berlin, Germany	Graduated/Went undrafted in 2014 NBA draft
Tyler Olander	10	F	6'10"	230	Senior	Mansfield, CT	Graduated
Shabazz Napier	13	G	6'1"	180	Senior	Roxbury, MA	Graduated/2014 NBA draft
Lasan Kromah	20	G/F	6'6"	201	GS Senior	Greenbelt, MD	Graduated/Went undrafted in 2014 NBA draft
Leon Tolksdorf	22	F	6'8"	218	Sophomore	Berlin, Germany	Transferred to American
Tor Watts	25	G	6'1"	202	Senior	Brooklyn, NY	Graduated

== Roster ==
2014–15 UConn Huskies men's basketball team
Players
Coaches

Pos.	#	Name	Height	Weight	Year	Previous school	Hometown
F	1	Phillip Nolan	6 ft 10 in (2.08 m)	237 lb (108 kg)	Jr	Riverside University	Milwaukee, WI
G	3	Terrence Samuel	6 ft 4 in (1.93 m)	202 lb (92 kg)	So	Victory Collegiate	Brooklyn, NY
G/F	5	Daniel Hamilton	6 ft 7 in (2.01 m)	190 lb (86 kg)	Fr	St. John Bosco	Los Angeles, CA
G	10	Sam Cassell Jr. (injured)	6 ft 4 in (1.93 m)	192 lb (87 kg)	RS So	Chipola College	Baltimore, MD
G	11	Ryan Boatright	6 ft 0 in (1.83 m)	175 lb (79 kg)	Sr	East Aurora	Aurora, IL
F	12	Kentan Facey	6 ft 9 in (2.06 m)	206 lb (93 kg)	So	Long Island (NY) Lutheran	Trelawny, Jamaica
F	14	Rakim Lubin	6 ft 8 in (2.03 m)	260 lb (118 kg)	Fr	Buford	Miami, FL
G	21	Omar Calhoun	6 ft 5 in (1.96 m)	205 lb (93 kg)	Jr	Christ the King	Brooklyn, NY
G	22	Pat Lenehan	6 ft 3 in (1.91 m)	190 lb (86 kg)	Sr	Xavier (CT)	Cheshire, CT
F	23	Nnamdi Amilo	6 ft 3 in (1.91 m)	225 lb (102 kg)	Jr	Avon Old Farms	New Fairfield, CT
G	24	Dan Guest (W)	6 ft 2 in (1.88 m)	214 lb (97 kg)	Sr	George Washington	West Hartford, CT
F	33	Terrance Ditimi (W)	6 ft 2 in (1.88 m)	209 lb (95 kg)	Sr	Stamford	Stamford, CT
C	35	Amida Brimah	7 ft 0 in (2.13 m)	230 lb (104 kg)	So	Archbishop Coleman F. Carroll	Accra, Ghana
G	44	Rodney Purvis	6 ft 4 in (1.93 m)	205 lb (93 kg)	RS So	Upper Room Christian Academy	Raleigh, NC

Head coach

- Kevin Ollie

Assistant coach(es)

- Karl Hobbs
- Glen Miller
- Ricky Moore

Legend

- (C) Team captain
- (S) Suspended
- (I) Ineligible
- (W) Walk-on
- Injured
- Current redshirt

Roster
Last update: 1/30/15

== Schedule ==
Date time, TV	Rank^{#}	Opponent^{#}	Result	Record	Site (attendance) city, state
Exhibition
11/04/2014*; 7:00 pm	No. 17	Southern Connecticut State	W 70–62		Gampel Pavilion (7,129); Storrs, CT
11/09/2014*; 12:00 pm	No. 17	Assumption	W 68–59		XL Center (7,109); Hartford, CT
Regular Season
11/14/2014*; 7:00 pm, SNY	No. 17	Bryant	W 66–53	1–0	Gampel Pavilion (10,167); Storrs, CT
11/20/2014*; 1:00 pm, ESPNU	No. 17	vs. College of Charleston; Puerto Rico Tip-Off Quarterfinals	W 65–57	2–0	Roberto Clemente Coliseum (6,723); San Juan, PR
11/21/2014*; 2:30 pm, ESPN2	No. 17	vs. Dayton; Puerto Rico Tip-Off Semifinals	W 75–64	3–0	Roberto Clemente Coliseum (7,438); San Juan, PR
11/23/2014*; 6:30 pm, ESPN2	No. 17	vs. West Virginia; Puerto Rico Tip-Off Championship	L 68–78	3–1	Roberto Clemente Coliseum (8,002); San Juan, PR
11/30/2014*; 12:00 pm, ESPN2	No. 24	No. 7 Texas	L 54–55	3–2	Gampel Pavilion (10,167); Storrs, CT
12/05/2014*; 7:00 pm, SNY		Yale	L 44–45	3–3	Gampel Pavilion (9,538); Storrs, CT
12/14/2014*; 4:00 pm, SNY		Coppin State	W 106–85	4–3	XL Center (8,260); Hartford, CT
12/18/2014*; 8:00 pm, ESPN		vs. No. 2 Duke; Izod Center Showcase	L 56–66	4–4	Izod Center (16,541); East Rutherford, NJ
12/22/2014*; 7:30 pm, SNY		Columbia	W 80–65	5–4	Webster Bank Arena (9,124); Bridgeport, CT
12/28/2014*; 1:00 pm, SNY		Central Connecticut	W 81–48	6–4	XL Center (13,315); Hartford, CT
12/31/2014; 1:00 pm, ESPN2		Temple	L 53–57 ^{OT}	6–5 (0–1)	XL Center (13,428); Hartford, CT
01/03/2015*; 2:00 pm, CBS		at Florida	W 63–59	7–5	O'Connell Center (11,041); Gainesville, FL
01/06/2015; 7:00 pm, ESPN2		at South Florida	W 58–44	8–5 (1–1)	USF Sun Dome (6,128); Tampa, FL
01/10/2015; 11:00 am, ESPN2		Cincinnati	W 62–56	9–5 (2–1)	XL Center (15,564); Hartford, CT
01/13/2015; 9:30 pm, CBSSN		at Tulsa	L 58–66	9–6 (2–2)	Reynolds Center (6,092); Tulsa, OK
01/17/2015*; 9:00 pm, ESPN2		at Stanford	L 59–72	9–7	Maples Pavilion (7,104); Stanford, CA
01/22/2015; 7:00 pm, CBSSN		UCF	W 67–60	10–7 (3–2)	Gampel Pavilion (10,167); Storrs, CT
01/25/2015; 12:00 pm, CBSSN		South Florida	W 66–53	11–7 (4–2)	XL Center (14,105); Hartford, CT
01/29/2015; 8:00 pm, ESPN2		at Cincinnati	L 58–70	11–8 (4–3)	Fifth Third Arena (11,092); Cincinnati, OH
02/01/2015; 3:00 pm, CBSSN		at Houston	L 58–60	11–9 (4–4)	Hofheinz Pavilion (3,498); Houston, TX
02/04/2015; 7:00 pm, ESPNU		East Carolina	W 65–52	12–9 (5–4)	Gampel Pavilion (8,985); Storrs, CT
02/07/2015; 6:00 pm, CBSSN		at Tulane	W 62–53	13–9 (6–4)	Devlin Fieldhouse (3,548); New Orleans, LA
02/12/2015; 7:00 pm, ESPN2		Tulsa	W 70–45	14–9 (7–4)	XL Center (11,506); Hartford, CT
02/14/2015; 9:00 pm, ESPN		at No. 25 SMU; ESPN College GameDay	L 55–73	14–10 (7–5)	Moody Coliseum (7,395); Dallas, TX
02/19/2015; 9:00 pm, ESPN		at Memphis	L 72–75	14–11 (7–6)	FedEx Forum (14,652); Memphis, TN
02/22/2015; 4:00 pm, CBSSN		Tulane	W 67–60	15–11 (8–6)	Gampel Pavilion (9,212); Storrs, CT
02/25/2015; 7:00 pm, ESPNU		at East Carolina	W 60–49	16–11 (9–6)	Williams Arena (6,856); Greenville, NC
03/01/2015; 2:00 pm, CBS		No. 21 SMU	W 81–73	17–11 (10–6)	XL Center (15,564); Hartford, CT
03/05/2015; 9:00 pm, ESPN2		Memphis	L 53–54	17–12 (10–7)	Gampel Pavilion (10,167); Storrs, CT
03/07/2015; 2:00 pm, ESPN2		at Temple	L 63–75	17–13 (10–8)	Liacouras Center (10,206); Philadelphia, PA
AAC Tournament
03/12/2015; 8:00 pm, ESPNews		South Florida; First round	W 69–43	18–13	XL Center (5,431); Hartford, CT
03/13/2015; 9:00 pm, ESPNU		Cincinnati; Quarterfinals	W 57–54	19–13	XL Center (9,514); Hartford, CT
03/14/2015; 5:00 pm, ESPN2		Tulsa; Semifinals	W 47–42	20–13	XL Center (10,114); Hartford, CT
03/15/2015; 3:15 pm, ESPN		No. 20 SMU; Championship game	L 54–62	20–14	XL Center (13,365); Hartford, CT
National Invitation Tournament
03/18/2015*; 7:00 pm, ESPN2	No. (4)	(5) Arizona State; First round	L 61–68	20–15	Gampel Pavilion (6,045); Storrs, CT
*Non-conference game. ^{#}Rankings from AP Poll. (#) Tournament seedings in parentheses. All times are in Eastern Time. (#) during NIT is seed within region.

== Rankings ==
Ranking movements Legend: ██ Increase in ranking ██ Decrease in ranking — = Not ranked RV = Received votes
	Week																			
Poll	Pre	2	3	4	5	6	7	8	9	10	11	12	13	14	15	16	17	18	19	Final
AP	17	17	24	RV	—	—	—	—	—	—	—	—	—	—	—	—	—	—	—	N/A
Coaches	15	17	22	23	—	—	—	RV	—	—	—	—	—	—	—	—	—	—	—	—
