= 2020–21 American Athletic Conference men's basketball season =

- League: NCAA Division I
- Sport: Basketball
- Duration: November 2020 through March 2021
- Teams: 11
- TV partner(s): CBS, ESPN, ESPN+

Regular Season
- Season champions: Wichita State
- Season MVP: Tyson Etienne, Wichita State & Quentin Grimes, Houston

Tournament
- Champions: Houston
- Runners-up: Cincinnati

American Athletic Conference men's basketball seasons
- ← 2019–20 2021–22 →

2020–21 American Athletic Conference men's basketball standings
	Conf.				Overall
Team	W		L	PCT	W		L	PCT
Wichita State	11	–	2	.846	16	–	6	.727
No. 6 Houston †	14	–	3	.824	28	–	4	.875
Memphis	11	–	4	.733	20	–	8	.714
SMU	7	–	4	.636	11	–	6	.647
Cincinnati	8	–	6	.571	12	–	11	.522
UCF	8	–	10	.444	11	–	12	.478
Tulsa	7	–	9	.438	11	–	12	.478
South Florida	4	–	10	.286	9	–	13	.409
Temple	4	–	10	.286	5	–	11	.313
Tulane	4	–	12	.250	10	–	13	.435
East Carolina	2	–	10	.167	8	–	11	.421
† 2021 AAC tournament winner Rankings from AP poll

The 2020–21 American Athletic Conference men's basketball season is scheduled to begin with practices in October 2020, followed by the start of the 2020–21 NCAA Division I men's basketball season in November 2020. Conference play will begin in December and conclude with the 2021 American Athletic Conference men's basketball tournament at Dickies Arena in Fort Worth, Texas. With UConn's departure on July 1, 2020, the American is back at 11 teams. For the 2020-21 Season due to COVID-19 pandemic The scheduling format was changed to a 20-game, double round-robin conference schedules. Conference play in men's basketball will began with three windows for games in December (Dec. 14–17, Dec. 21-23 and Dec. 28–31).

== Previous season ==
Cincinnati, Houston and Tulsa were declared co-champions. The 2020 American Athletic Conference men's basketball tournament was supposed to be held at Dickies Arena in Fort Worth, Texas. Due to the coronavirus pandemic the tournament was cancelled on March 12, 2020 – only minutes before the first game was set to begin.

Precious Achiuwa from Memphis was named the AAC player of the year, Tulsa's Frank Haith was named coach of the year.

2020–21 will mark the first year of the AAC's new TV Contract. The deal includes a minimum of 65 regular-season games per season on ESPN, ESPN2 and ESPNU, with at least 25 on ESPN or ESPN2. Complete annual coverage of the conference tournament across ESPN, ESPN2 and ESPNU, including the championship game on ESPN.

== Head coaches ==
=== Coaching changes ===
On November 17, 2020: Wichita State coach Gregg Marshall resigned following an investigation into allegations of verbal and physical abuse, Wichita State promoted assistant coach Isaac Brown, to interim coach. On February 26, 2021, he was named permanent head coach, agreeing to a five-year deal.

=== Coaches ===
Note: Stats are through the beginning of the season. All stats and records are from time at current school only

Team	Head coach	Previous job	Years at school	Overall record	AAC record	AAC titles	NCAA Tournaments*	NCAA Final Fours	NCAA Championships
Cincinnati	John Brannen	Northern Kentucky	2	32–20	21–11	1	0	0	0
East Carolina	Joe Dooley	Florida Gulf Coast	7	94–106	10–35	0	0	0	0
Houston	Kelvin Sampson	Houston Rockets (asst.)	7	167–64	85–40	2	3	1	0
Memphis	Penny Hardaway	East HS	3	63–32	31–19	0	0	0	0
SMU	Tim Jankovich	SMU (asst.)	6	101–55	45–38	1	1	0	0
South Florida	Brian Gregory	Michigan State (advisor)	4	57–66	23–46	0	0	0	0
Temple	Aaron McKie	Temple (asst.)	2	19–28	10–22	0	0	0	0
Tulane	Ron Hunter	Georgia State	2	22–31	8–26	0	0	0	0
Tulsa	Frank Haith	Missouri	7	127–87	74–50	1	1	0	0
UCF	Johnny Dawkins	Stanford	5	94–60	48–42	0	1	0	0
Wichita State	Isaac Brown	Wichita State (asst.)	1	16–6	11–2	1	1	0	0

Notes:

- Overall and AAC records are from time at current school and are through the end of 2020–21 season. NCAA records include time at current school only.
- AAC records only, prior conference records not included.
- *In current job

== Preseason ==
=== Preseason media poll ===
On October 28, The American released the preseason Poll and other preseason awards

Coaches Poll
Predicted finish	Team	Votes (1st place)
1	Houston	99 (9)
2	Memphis	90 (2)
3	SMU	80
4	Cincinnati	77
5	South Florida	61
6	Tulsa	50
7	Wichita State	44
8	UCF	37
9	East Carolina	34
10	Temple	18
11	Tulane	15

=== Preseason All-AAC ===
Honor	Recipient
Preseason Player of the Year	Caleb Mills, Houston
Preseason Rookie of the Year	Moussa Cissé, Memphis
Preseason All-AAC First Team
Preseason All-AAC First Team	Keith Williams, Cincinnati
Preseason All-AAC First Team	Jayden Gardner, East Carolina*
Preseason All-AAC First Team	Caleb Mills, Houston*
Preseason All-AAC First Team	Kendric Davis, SMU
Preseason All-AAC First Team	Brandon Rachal, Tulsa
Preseason All-AAC Second Team
Preseason All-AAC Second Team	Chris Vogt, Cincinnati
Preseason All-AAC Second Team	D. J. Jeffries, Memphis
Preseason All-AAC Second Team	Landers Nolley II, Memphis
Preseason All-AAC Second Team	Alexis Yetna, USF
Preseason All-AAC Second Team	Tyson Jolly, SMU
*Unanimous selections

== Regular season ==
=== Conference matrix ===
This table summarizes the head-to-head results between teams in conference play.

	Cincinnati	East Carolina	Houston	Memphis	SMU	South Florida	Temple	Tulane	Tulsa	UCF	Wichita State
vs. Cincinnati	—	0–1	1–0	1–0	0–1	1–0	0–2	0–2	1–1	1–1	1–0
vs. East Carolina	1–0	—	0–1	2–0	2–0	1–0	0–0	1–1	2–0	1–0	0–0
vs. Houston	0–1	1–0	—	0–1	0–2	0–2	0–2	0–2	1–1	0–2	1–1
vs. Memphis	0–1	0–2	1–0	—	1–1	0–2	0–0	0–2	2–0	0–2	0–1
vs. SMU	1–0	0–2	2–0	1–1	—	0–0	0–2	0–0	0–1	0–1	0–0
vs. South Florida	0–1	0–1	2–0	2–0	0–0	—	1–1	1–0	1–0	1–1	2–0
vs. Temple	2–0	0–0	2–0	0–0	2–0	1–1	—	1–1	1–1	0–1	1–0
vs. Tulane	2–0	1–1	2–0	2–0	0–0	0–1	1–1	—	0–1	2–0	2–0
vs. Tulsa	1–1	0–1	1–1	0–2	1–0	0–1	1–1	1–0	—	2–0	2–0
vs. UCF	1–1	0–2	2–0	2–0	1–0	1–1	1–0	0–2	0–2	—	2–0
vs. Wichita State	0–1	0–0	1–1	1–0	0–0	0–2	0–1	0–2	0–2	0–2	—
Total	8–6	2–10	14–3	11–4	7–4	4–10	4–10	4–12	7–9	8–10	11–2

=== Player of the week ===
Throughout the regular season, the American Athletic Conference named a player and rookie of the week.

Week	Player of the week	Freshman of the week	Ref.
Week 1 – Nov 30	Marcus Sasser, Houston	Tramon Mark, Houston	
Week 2 – Dec 7	Kendric Davis, SMU	Tramon Mark (2), Houston	
Week 3 – Dec 14	David Collins, USF	Moussa Cissé, Memphis	
Week 4 – Dec 21	Brandon Mahan, UCF	Isaiah Adams, UCF	
Week 5 – Dec 28	Tyson Etienne, Wichita State	Caleb Murphy, USF	
Week 6 – Jan 4	Brandon Rachal, Tulsa	Caleb Murphy (2), USF	
Week 7 – Jan 11	Marcus Sasser (2), Houston	Ricky Council IV, Wichita State	
Week 8 – Jan 18	Morris Udeze, Wichita State	Damian Dunn, Temple	
Week 9 – Jan 25	Quentin Grimes, Houston	Moussa Cisse (2), Memphis	
Week 10 – Feb 1	Tyson Etienne (2), Wichita State	Tylan Pope, Tulane	
Week 11 – Feb 8	Jayden Gardner, East Carolina	Damian Dunn (2), Temple	
Week 12 – Feb 15	Kendric Davis (2), SMU	Jeremiah Williams, Temple	
Week 13 – Feb 22	Tyson Etienne (3), Wichita State	Isaiah Adams (2), UCF	
Week 14 – Mar 1	Quentin Grimes (2), Houston	Moussa Cisse (3), Memphis	
Week 15 – Mar 8	Dexter Dennis, Wichita State	Isaiah Adams (3), UCF	

=== All-AAC Awards and Teams ===
Honor	Recipient
Player of the Year	Quentin Grimes, Houston; Tyson Etienne, Wichita State
Coach of the Year	Isaac Brown, Wichita State*
Freshman of the Year	Moussa Cissé, Memphis
Defensive Player of the Year	DeJon Jarreau, Houston
Most Improved Player	Justin Gorham, Houston
Sixth Man of the Year	Boogie Ellis, Memphis; Darien Jackson, Tulsa
Sportsmanship Award	J. P. Moorman II, Temple
All-AAC First Team
All-AAC First Team	Jayden Gardner, East Carolina
All-AAC First Team	Quentin Grimes, Houston*
All-AAC First Team	Landers Nolley II, Memphis
All-AAC First Team	Kendric Davis, SMU*
All-AAC First Team	Tyson Etienne, Wichita State*
All-AAC Second Team
All-AAC Second Team	Keith Williams, Cincinnati
All-AAC Second Team	DeJon Jarreau, Houston
All-AAC Second Team	Justin Gorham, Houston
All-AAC Second Team	Marcus Sasser, Houston
All-AAC Second Team	Brandon Rachal, Tulsa
All-AAC Third Team
All-AAC Third Team	Brandon Mahan, UCF
All-AAC Third Team	Darius Perry, UCF
All-AAC Third Team	Feron Hunt, SMU
All-AAC Third Team	Khalif Battle, Temple
All-AAC Third Team	Jaylen Forbes, Tulane
All-AAC Third Team	Alterique Gilbert, Wichita State
All-Freshman Team
All-Freshman Team	Isaiah Adams, UCF
All-Freshman Team	Tari Eason, Cincinnati
All-Freshman Team	Moussa Cissé, Memphis
All-Freshman Team	Caleb Murphy, South Florida
All-Freshman Team	Damian Dunn, Temple
All-Freshman Team	Ricky Council IV, Wichita State
*Unanimous selections

== Postseason ==
=== American Athletic Conference tournament ===
First round Thursday, March 11
8	South Florida	73
9	Temple	71
7	Tulsa	70
10	Tulane	77
6	UCF	72
11	East Carolina	62

Quarterfinals; Friday, March 12
1	Wichita State	68
8	South Florida	67
4	SMU	71
5	Cincinnati	74
2	#7 Houston	77
10	Tulane	52
3	Memphis	70
6	UCF	62

Semifinals; Saturday, March 13
1	Wichita State	59
5	Cincinnati	60
2	#7 Houston	76
3	Memphis	74

Championship; Sunday, March 14
5	Cincinnati	54
2	#7 Houston	91

=== NCAA tournament ===
The winner of the 2021 American Athletic Conference men's basketball tournament, will receive the conference's automatic bid to the 2021 NCAA Division I men's basketball tournament.

Seed	Region	School	First Four	First round	Second round	Sweet Sixteen	Elite Eight	Final Four	Championship
2	Midwest	Houston	N/A	defeated (15) Cleveland State, 87–56	defeated (10) Rutgers, 63–60	defeated (11) Syracuse, 62–46	defeated (12) Oregon State, 67–61	eliminated by (1) Baylor, 59–78	
11	West	Wichita State	eliminated by (11) Drake, 52–53						
		W–L (%):	0–1 (.000)	1–0 (1.000)	1–0 (1.000)	1–0 (1.000)	1–0 (1.000)	0–1 (.000)	0–0 (–) Total: 4–2 (.667)

=== National Invitation tournament ===
Seed	Bracket	School	First round	Quarterfinals	Semifinals	Finals
1	Memphis	Memphis	defeated (4) Dayton, 71–60	defeated (2) Boise State, 59–56	defeated (1) Colorado State, 90–67	defeated (4) Mississippi State, 77–64
3	Memphis	SMU	eliminated by (2) Boise State, 84–85			
		W–L (%):	1–1 (.500)	1–0 (1.000)	1–0 (1.000)	1–0 (1.000) Total: 4–1 (.800)

== NBA draft ==
The following list includes all AAC players who were drafted in the 2021 NBA draft.

Player	Position	School	Round	Pick	Team
Quentin Grimes	SG	Houston	1	25	Los Angeles Clippers
