= 2021–22 American Athletic Conference men's basketball season =

- League: NCAA Division I
- Sport: Basketball
- Duration: November 2021 through March 2022
- Teams: 11
- TV partner(s): CBS, ESPN, ESPN+

Regular season
- Season champions: Houston
- Season MVP: Kendric Davis, SMU

Tournament
- Champions: Houston
- Runners-up: Memphis

American Athletic Conference men's basketball seasons
- ← 2020–21 2022–23 →

2021–22 American Athletic Conference men's basketball standings
| | Conf. | | | | Overall |
| Team | W | | L | PCT | W | | L | PCT |
|---|---|---|---|---|---|---|---|---|
| No. 15 Houston † | 15 | – | 3 | .833 | 32 | – | 6 | .842 |
| SMU | 13 | – | 4 | .765 | 24 | – | 9 | .727 |
| Memphis | 13 | – | 5 | .722 | 22 | – | 11 | .667 |
| Temple | 10 | – | 7 | .588 | 17 | – | 12 | .586 |
| Tulane | 10 | – | 8 | .556 | 14 | – | 15 | .483 |
| UCF | 9 | – | 9 | .500 | 18 | – | 12 | .600 |
| Wichita State | 6 | – | 9 | .400 | 15 | – | 13 | .536 |
| Cincinnati | 7 | – | 11 | .389 | 18 | – | 15 | .545 |
| East Carolina | 6 | – | 11 | .353 | 15 | – | 15 | .500 |
| Tulsa | 4 | – | 14 | .222 | 11 | – | 20 | .355 |
| South Florida | 3 | – | 15 | .167 | 8 | – | 23 | .258 |
† 2022 AAC tournament winner Rankings from AP poll

The 2021–22 American Athletic Conference men's basketball season began with practices in October 2021, followed by the start of the 2021–22 NCAA Division I men's basketball season on November 9, 2021. Conference play began December 15, 2021, and concluded with the 2022 American Athletic Conference men's basketball tournament, held March 10–13, 2022, at Dickies Arena in Fort Worth, Texas.

Scheduling returned to the previous format: an 18-game schedule in which every team in The American played eight of its 10 conference opponents twice and the other two opponents once—one at home and one on the road.

== Previous season ==
Wichita State won the regular season championship. The 2021 American Athletic Conference men's basketball tournament was held at Dickies Arena in Fort Worth, Texas, which was won by Houston. Houston and Wichita State received bids to the NCAA tournament. Wichita State lost in the First Four to Drake, while Houston advanced to the Final Four before losing to eventual National Champion Baylor. The conference finished 4–2 overall. Memphis and SMU received bids to the 2021 National Invitation Tournament. SMU lost to Boise State in the first round, while Memphis won the NIT defeating Mississippi State in the Championship game. The conference went 4–1 overall in the NIT.

Quentin Grimes from Houston and Tyson Etienne from Wichita State were named the co-AAC Players of the Year. Wichita State's Isaac Brown was named Coach of the Year.

== Coaches ==
=== Coaching changes ===
| Coach | School | Reason | Replacement |
|---|---|---|---|
| John Brannen | Cincinnati | Cincinnati fired Brannen after 2 seasons on April 9, 2021, following an internal review of unspecified allegations related to Brannen and the program. The investigation was triggered after six players entered the NCAA transfer portal within three days of the Bearcats' final game of the season. | Wes Miller. |

=== Head coaches ===
Note: Stats are through the beginning of the season. All stats and records are from time at current school only.

| Team | Head coach | Previous job | Years at school | Overall record | AAC record | AAC titles | NCAA tournaments* | NCAA Final Fours | NCAA Championships |
|---|---|---|---|---|---|---|---|---|---|
| Cincinnati | Wes Miller | UNC Greensboro | 0 | 0–0 | 0–0 | 0 | 0 | 0 | 0 |
| East Carolina | Joe Dooley | Florida Gulf Coast | 7 | 94–106 | 10–35 | 0 | 0 | 0 | 0 |
| Houston | Kelvin Sampson | Houston Rockets (asst.) | 7 | 167–64 | 85–40 | 2 | 3 | 1 | 0 |
| Memphis | Penny Hardaway | East HS | 3 | 63–32 | 31–19 | 0 | 0 | 0 | 0 |
| SMU | Tim Jankovich | SMU (asst.) | 6 | 101–55 | 45–38 | 1 | 1 | 0 | 0 |
| South Florida | Brian Gregory | Michigan State (advisor) | 4 | 57–66 | 23–46 | 0 | 0 | 0 | 0 |
| Temple | Aaron McKie | Temple (asst.) | 2 | 19–28 | 10–22 | 0 | 0 | 0 | 0 |
| Tulane | Ron Hunter | Georgia State | 2 | 22–31 | 8–26 | 0 | 0 | 0 | 0 |
| Tulsa | Frank Haith | Missouri | 7 | 127–87 | 74–50 | 1 | 1 | 0 | 0 |
| UCF | Johnny Dawkins | Stanford | 5 | 94–60 | 48–42 | 0 | 1 | 0 | 0 |
| Wichita State | Isaac Brown | Wichita State (asst.) | 1 | 16–6 | 11–2 | 1 | 1 | 0 | 0 |

Notes:

- Overall and AAC records are from time at current school and are through the end of 2020–21 season. NCAA records include time at current school only.
- AAC records only, prior conference records not included.
- *In current job

== Preseason ==
=== Recruiting classes ===
2021 Recruiting classes rankings
| Team | ESPN | Rivals | 247 Sports | Signees |
|---|---|---|---|---|
| Cincinnati | - | - | - | - |
| East Carolina | - | No. 46 | No. 107 | 5 |
| Houston | - | - | No. 44 | 3 |
| Memphis | - | - | No. 1 | 6 |
| SMU | - | No. 33 | No. 36 | 4 |
| South Florida | - | No. 55 | No. 101 | 1 |
| Temple | - | No. 46 | No. 77 | 2 |
| Tulane | - | - | - | - |
| Tulsa | - | No. 32 | No. 62 | 3 |
| UCF | - | No. 26 | No. 88 | 3 |
| Wichita State | - | No. 55 | No. 66 | 3 |

=== Preseason watchlists ===
Below is a table of notable preseason watch lists.

| | Wooden | Naismith | Cousy | West | Erving | Malone | NABC | Abdul-Jabbar |
| Emoni Bates, Memphis | ✓ | ✓ | | | | | | |
| Kendric Davis, SMU | ✓ | ✓ | ✓ | | | | | |
| Jalen Duren, Memphis | ✓ | ✓ | | | | | | ✓ |
| Tyson Etienne, Wichita State | ✓ | | | | | | | |
| Marcus Sasser, Houston | ✓ | ✓ | | | | | | |
| DeAndre Williams, Memphis | | | | | | ✓ | | |

=== Preseason media poll ===
On October 13, The American released the preseason Poll and other preseason awards.

Coaches Poll
| Predicted finish | Team | Votes (1st place) |
| 1 | Houston | 98 (8) |
| 2 | Memphis | 92 (3) |
| 3 | SMU | 77 |
| 4 | Wichita State | 76 |
| 5 | UCF | 66 |
| 6 | Cincinnati | 52 |
| 7 | Tulsa | 43 |
| 8 | Temple | 37 |
| T-9 | South Florida | 25 |
| T-9 | Tulane | 25 |
| 11 | East Carolina | 14 |

=== Preseason All-AAC ===
| Honor | Recipient |
|---|---|
| Preseason Player of the Year | Tyson Etienne, Wichita State |
| Preseason Rookie of the Year | Jalen Duren, Memphis |
Preseason All-AAC First Team
| Preseason All-AAC First Team | Marcus Sasser, Houston |
| Preseason All-AAC First Team | Jalen Duren, Memphis |
| Preseason All-AAC First Team | Landers Nolley II, Memphis |
| Preseason All-AAC First Team | Kendric Davis, SMU* |
| Preseason All-AAC First Team | Tyson Etienne, Wichita State* |
Preseason All-AAC Second Team
| Preseason All-AAC Second Team | Brandon Mahan, UCF |
| Preseason All-AAC Second Team | Emoni Bates, Memphis |
| Preseason All-AAC Second Team | DeAndre Williams, Memphis |
| Preseason All-AAC Second Team | Jeremiah Davenport, Cincinnati |
| Preseason All-AAC Second Team | Jaylen Forbes, Tulane |
*Unanimous selections

== Regular season ==
=== Conference matrix ===
This table summarizes the head-to-head results between teams in conference play, There were 3 games which were postponed that weren't made up, resulting in unbalanced conference schedules

| | Cincinnati | East Carolina | Houston | Memphis | SMU | South Florida | Temple | Tulane | Tulsa | UCF | Wichita State |
|---|---|---|---|---|---|---|---|---|---|---|---|
| vs. Cincinnati | — | 0–2 | 2–0 | 2–0 | 1–1 | 1–1 | 2–0 | 1–0 | 1–1 | 1–0 | 0–2 |
| vs. East Carolina | 2–0 | — | 1–0 | 1–1 | 1–0 | 0–2 | 2–0 | 1–1 | 0–2 | 2–0 | 1–0 |
| vs. Houston | 0–2 | 0–1 | — | 2–0 | 1–1 | 0–2 | 0–2 | 0–2 | 0–1 | 0–2 | 0–2 |
| vs. Memphis | 0–2 | 1–1 | 0–2 | — | 2–0 | 0–1 | 0–1 | 1–1 | 0–2 | 1–1 | 0–2 |
| vs. SMU | 1–1 | 0–1 | 1–1 | 0–2 | — | 0–2 | 1–1 | 0–2 | 0–2 | 0–1 | 1–0 |
| vs. South Florida | 1–1 | 2–0 | 2–0 | 1–0 | 2–0 | — | 1–1 | 2–0 | 2–0 | 1–1 | 1–0 |
| vs. Temple | 0–2 | 0–2 | 2–0 | 1–0 | 1–1 | 1–1 | — | 1–1 | 0–2 | 1–1 | 0–0 |
| vs. Tulane | 0–1 | 1–1 | 2–0 | 1–1 | 2–0 | 0–2 | 1–1 | — | 0–1 | 1–1 | 0–2 |
| vs. Tulsa | 1–1 | 2–0 | 1–0 | 2–0 | 2–0 | 0–2 | 2–0 | 1–0 | — | 1–1 | 2–0 |
| vs. UCF | 0–1 | 0–2 | 2–0 | 1–1 | 1–0 | 1–1 | 1–1 | 1–1 | 1–1 | — | 1–1 |
| vs. Wichita State | 2–0 | 0–1 | 2–0 | 2–0 | 0–1 | 0–1 | 0–0 | 2–0 | 0–2 | 1–1 | — |
| Total | 7–11 | 6–11 | 15–3 | 13–5 | 13–4 | 3–15 | 10–7 | 10–8 | 4–14 | 9–9 | 6–9 |

=== Player of the week ===
Throughout the regular season, the American Athletic Conference named a player and rookie of the week.

| Week | Player of the week | Freshman of the week | Ref. |
|---|---|---|---|
| Week 1 – Nov 15 | Marcus Sasser, Houston | Emoni Bates, Memphis | |
| Week 2 – Nov 22 | Kendric Davis, SMU | Jalen Duren, Memphis | |
| Week 3 – Nov 29 | Khalif Battle, Temple | Kenny Pohto, Wichita State | |
| Week 4 – Dec 6 | Kendric Davis (2), SMU | Viktor Lakhin, Cincinnati | |
| Week 5 – Dec 13 | Vance Jackson, East Carolina | Zhuric Phelps, SMU | |
| Week 6 – Dec 20 | Kendric Davis (3), SMU | Jalen Duren (2), Memphis | |
| Week 7 – Dec 27 | Zach Hicks, Temple | Kenny Pohto (2), Wichita State | |
| Week 8 – Jan 3 | Jalen Cook, Tulane | Josh Minott, Memphis | |
| Week 9 – Jan 10 | Josh Carlton, Houston; Damian Dunn, Temple | Jahlil White, Temple | |
| Week 10 – Jan 17 | Kyler Edwards, Houston | Jahlil White (2), Temple | |
| Week 11 – Jan 24 | Kyler Edwards (2), Houston | Darius Johnson, UCF | |
| Week 12 – Jan 31 | Marcus Weathers, SMU; Jalen Cook (2), Tulane | Josh Minott (2), Memphis | |
| Week 13 – Feb 7 | Fabian White Jr., Houston | Jalen Duren (3), Memphis | |
| Week 14 – Feb 14 | Marcus Weathers (2), SMU | Jalen Duren (4), Memphis | |
| Week 15 – Feb 21 | Tai Strickland, Temple | Darius Johnson (2), UCF | |
| Week 16 – Feb 28 | Fabian White Jr. (2), Houston | Jalen Duren (5), Memphis | |
| Week 17 – Mar 7 | Michael Weathers, SMU | Jalen Duren (6), Memphis | |

=== All-AAC Awards and teams ===
| Honor | Recipient |
|---|---|
| Player of the Year | Kendric Davis, SMU |
| Coach of the Year | Kelvin Sampson, Houston |
| Freshman of the Year | Jalen Duren, Memphis* |
| Defensive Player of the Year | Dexter Dennis, Wichita State |
| Most Improved Player | Kevin Cross, Tulane |
| Sixth Man of the Year | Ricky Council IV, Wichita State |
| Sportsmanship Award | Darien Jackson, Tulsa |
All-AAC First Team
| All-AAC First Team | Josh Carlton, Houston |
| All-AAC First Team | Fabian White Jr., Houston |
| All-AAC First Team | Jalen Duren, Memphis |
| All-AAC First Team | Kendric Davis, SMU* |
| All-AAC First Team | Jalen Cook, Tulane |
All-AAC Second Team
| All-AAC Second Team | Tristen Newton, East Carolina |
| All-AAC Second Team | Kyler Edwards, Houston |
| All-AAC Second Team | DeAndre Williams, Memphis |
| All-AAC Second Team | Marcus Weathers, SMU |
| All-AAC Second Team | Damian Dunn, Temple |
| All-AAC Second Team | Jaylen Forbes, Tulane |
All-AAC Third Team
| All-AAC Third Team | Darin Green Jr., UCF |
| All-AAC Third Team | David DeJulius, Cincinnati |
| All-AAC Third Team | Jamal Shead, Houston |
| All-AAC Third Team | Kevin Cross, Tulane |
| All-AAC Third Team | Tyson Etienne, Wichita State |
All-Freshman Team
| All-Freshman Team | Darius Johnson, UCF |
| All-Freshman Team | Jalen Duren, Memphis* |
| All-Freshman Team | Josh Minott, Memphis |
| All-Freshman Team | Zach Hicks, Temple |
| All-Freshman Team | Jahlil White, Temple |
*Unanimous selections

== Postseason ==
=== American Athletic Conference tournament ===
* – Denotes overtime period

First round Thursday, March 10
8 | Cincinnati | 74
9 | East Carolina | 63
7 | Wichita State | 67
10 | Tulsa | 73
6 | UCF | 60
11 | South Florida | 58

Quarterfinals; Friday, March 11
1 | #18 Houston | 69
8 | Cincinnati | 56
4 | Temple | 60
5 | Tulane | 69
2 | SMU | 83
10 | Tulsa | 58
3 | Memphis | 85
6 | UCF | 69

Semifinals; Saturday, March 12
1 | #18 Houston | 86
5 | Tulane | 66
2 | SMU | 63
3 | Memphis | 70

Championship; Sunday, March 13
1 | #18 Houston | 71
3 | Memphis | 53

=== NCAA tournament ===
Two teams from the conference were selected to participate:

| Seed | Region | School | First Four | First Round | Second Round | Sweet Sixteen | Elite Eight | Final Four | Championship |
|---|---|---|---|---|---|---|---|---|---|
| 5 | South | Houston | N/A | defeated (12) UAB, 82–68 | defeated (4) Illinois, 68–53 | defeated (1) Arizona, 72–60 | eliminated by (2) Villanova, 44–50 | – | – |
| 9 | West | Memphis | N/A | defeated (8) Boise State, 64–53 | eliminated by (1) Gonzaga, 78–82 | – | – | – | – |
| | | W–L (%): | 0–0 (–) | 2–0 (1.000) | 1–1 (.500) | 1–0 (1.000) | 0–1 (.000) | 0–0 (–) | 0–0 (–) Total: 4–2 (.667) |

=== National Invitation tournament ===
One team from the conference was selected to participate:

| Seed | Bracket | School | First Round | Second Round | Quarterfinals | Semifinals | Finals |
|---|---|---|---|---|---|---|---|
| 1 | SMU | SMU | defeated Nicholls, 68–58 | eliminated by (4) Washington State, 63–75 | | | |
| | | W–L (%): | 1–0 (1.000) | 0–1 (.000) | 0–0 (–) | 0–0 (–) | 0–0 (–) Total: 1–1 (.500) |

== NBA draft ==
The following list includes all AAC players who were drafted in the 2022 NBA draft.

| Player | Position | School | Round | Pick | Team |
|---|---|---|---|---|---|
| Jalen Duren | C | Memphis | 1 | 13 | Charlotte Hornets |
| Josh Minott | SF | Memphis | 2 | 45 | Charlotte Hornets |
