= 2013 $45-million ATM looting =

In December 2012 and February 2013, a cyber-ring of criminals, operating in more than 24 countries, stole $45 million from thousands of automated teller machines (ATMs) in an ATM looting. Roughly $5 million was stolen around the world on December 21, 2012. Success led to expansion of the crime, when an additional $40 million was stolen on February 19, 2013.

The thefts included $2.4 million withdrawn from almost three thousand ATMs in New York City in a matter of hours during the February 2013 theft. Eight suspects were charged in May 2013 for the New York portion of the thefts – though one of the eight had already been found dead in the Dominican Republic, the previous month.

The thefts were reported to be based on a sophisticated computer hacking procedure, whereby prepaid debit card information was stolen from the computers of financial institutions. The cards were then adjusted to have unlimited balances, so that gangs of criminals across the world could use the cards to withdraw the maximum amount the ATMs would allow in their target region. By using prepaid debit cards rather than customer bank cards or customer credit cards, the criminals were able to avoid the alarms or suspension-of-activity that might happen with these other types of cards. The resulting $45 million theft was from the accounts of financial institutions themselves, rather than customer accounts.

== See also ==
- List of large value US robberies
