= Asheville Christian Academy =

American private school in North Carolina

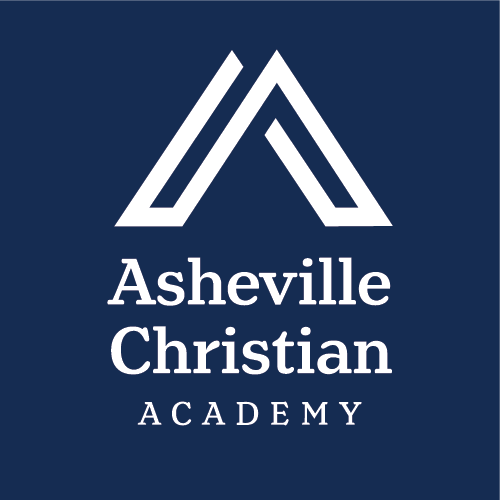

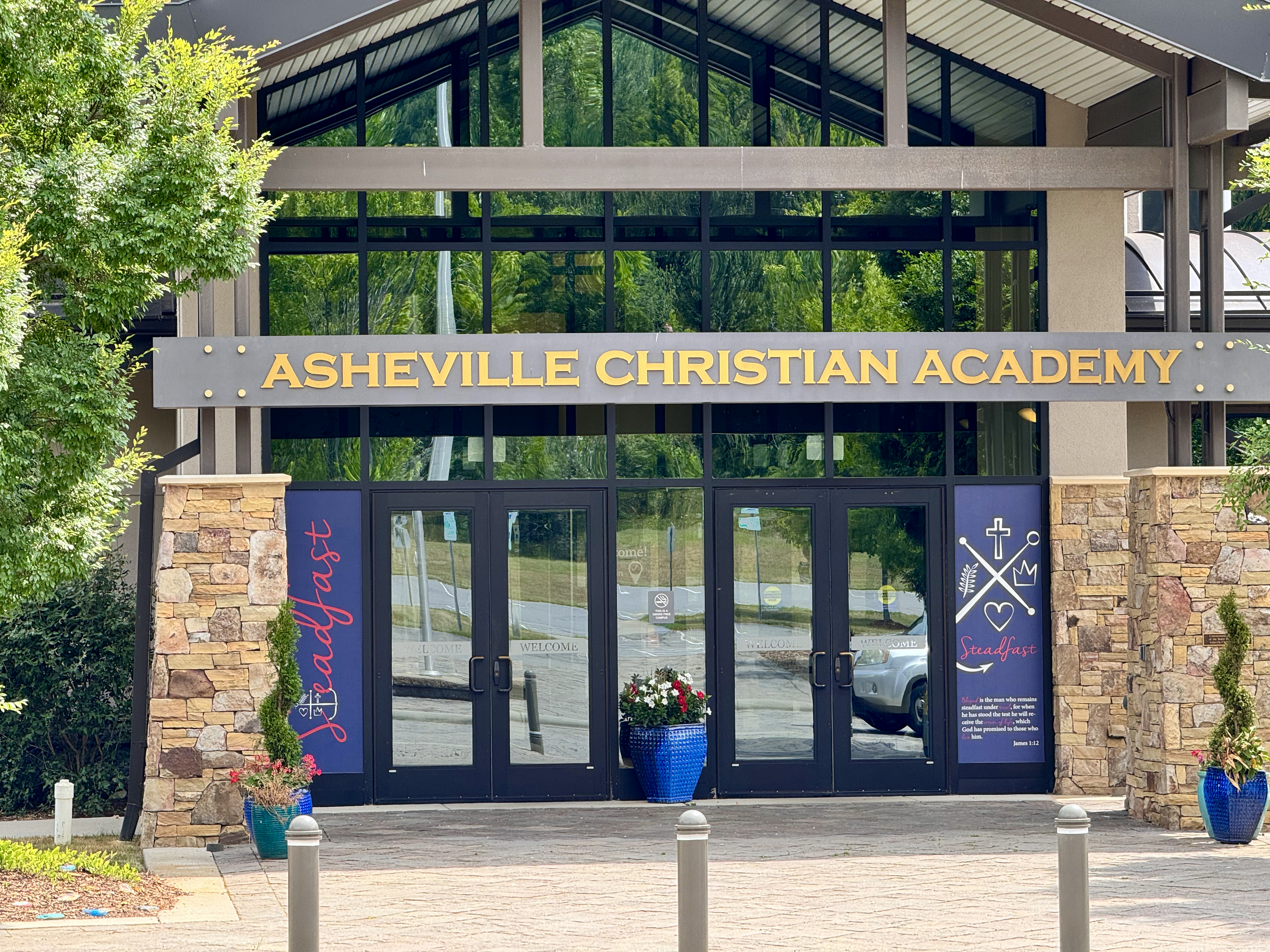

Location
- 74 Riverwood Road; Swannanoa, North Carolina 28778; United States; 35°36′17″N 82°24′36″W

Information
- School type: Private, Christian
- Established: 1958 (68 years ago)
- CEEB code: 340117
- Head of school: William George
- Grades: K–12
- Enrollment: 647
- Color: Blue
- Athletics: NCISAA
- Mascot: The Lions
- Website: ashevillechristian.org

Asheville Christian Academy (ACA) is a private Christian school for grades K–12 in Buncombe County, North Carolina. It is located on a 60-plus-acre campus in the Swannanoa River Valley, approximately 12 miles from downtown Asheville. The school is accredited by Cognia, a standards-based accreditation body and the Association of Christian Schools International (ACSI), with a teaching faculty of over 50, half of whom hold advanced degrees. The school is governed by a corporation made up of parents, alumni, faculty, staff and other stake holders who elect a board of trustees. The headmaster since 1992 has been William George. The school's enrollment in 2020 is 647.

== History ==
The school was founded in 1959 as Asheville Christian Day School, held classes at First Alliance Church. In 1972, it merged with Blue Ridge Christian Academy, under the new name Asheville Christian Academy. The school occupied a campus on Bell Road in the Haw Creek community of Asheville, until the current campus was established in 2003. Grades 10-12 were added in 1988. In 2012 graduating ACA seniors were accepted at more than 70 four-year universities and colleges. It also operates jointly with the local Asheville Buncombe Tech Community College and Montreat College in a dual enrollment program for juniors and seniors to gain college credit as part of their high school graduation requirements. In 2014 ACA was ranked in the top 50 Christian high schools in the United States.

== Notable alumni ==
- Flamy Grant, drag queen and Christian singer
- Caleb Mills (2018), basketball player
