= Nic Moore =

American professional basketball player (born 1991)

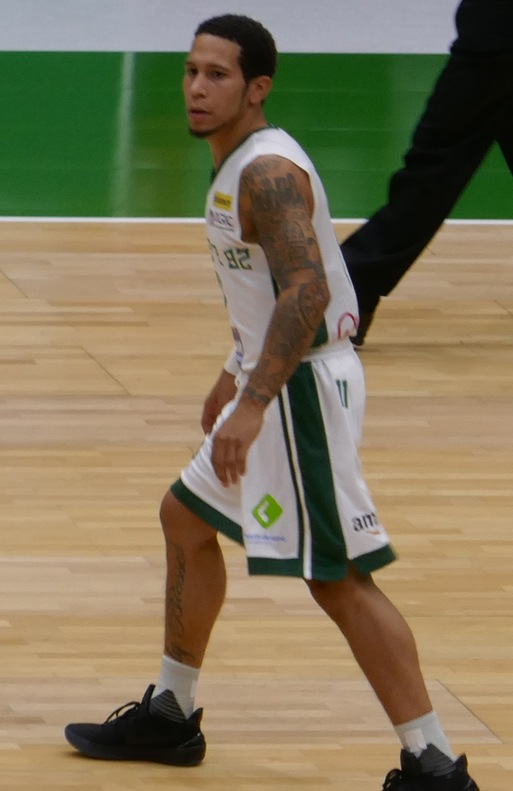
- Moore with Nanterre 92 in 2017

Free Agent
- Position: Point guard

Personal information
- Born: July 1, 1992 (age 34) Winona Lake, Indiana, U.S.
- Listed height: 5 ft 9 in (1.75 m)
- Listed weight: 170 lb (77 kg)

Career information
- High school: Warsaw (Warsaw, Indiana)
- College: Illinois State (2011–2012); SMU (2013–2016)
- NBA draft: 2016: undrafted
- Playing career: 2016–present

Career history
- 2016–2017: New Basket Brindisi
- 2017: Nanterre 92
- 2017–2018: New Basket Brindisi
- 2018–2019: Virtus Roma
- 2019–2020: Champagne Châlons-Reims
- 2021: Benfica
- 2021: MKS Dąbrowa Górnicza
- 2021–2023: Boulazac Basket Dordogne

Career highlights
- AP Honorable Mention All-American (2016); 2× AAC Player of the Year (2015, 2016); 3× First-team All-AAC (2014–2016); MVC All-Freshman Team (2012)
Medals
Men's basketball
Representing United States
Summer Universiade
Gold medal – first place	2015 Gwangju	Team competition

Nic Moore (born July 1, 1992) is an American professional basketball player. Moore played college basketball for the SMU Mustangs. He was named American Athletic Conference Men's Basketball Player of the Year in 2015 and 2016. Moore previously competed for the Illinois State Redbirds.

== College career ==
Moore played his freshman year at Illinois State, where he averaged 10.0 points and 3.9 assists per game and was named to the Missouri Valley Conference All-Freshman team. In the first round of the 2012 National Invitation Tournament, Moore scored 24 points in a 96–93 win against Ole Miss. He posted 25 points in their 92–88 loss to eventual champion Stanford. After the season, Illinois State coach Tim Jankovich accepted an assistant coach job at SMU. "As soon as Coach Jankovich left I made up my mind and knew I wanted to go play for a BCS program," Moore stated. "It didn't matter who was going to be the head coach. My decision had already been made." He ended up transferring to SMU to play under Larry Brown.

In his sophomore season, Moore posted averages of 13.6 points, 4.9 assists, 2.3 rebounds and 1.5 steals in 32.2 minutes per game. Moore scored in double figures in 30 of the Mustangs' 37 games. In the quarterfinals of the 2014 National Invitation Tournament, he hit a 3-pointer to in the closing seconds to help SMU to a 67–65 win over California.

As a junior, Moore led SMU in scoring (14.2 points per game) and assists (5.2 per game) in 34.5 minutes per game. He shot 42.2 percent from the floor and 40.8 percent on 3-pointers. Moore, who called being coached by Larry Brown stressful, improved his hot-headedness and won praised for having a quick hand. "He [Brown] showed me the ropes of the game," Moore said. "I thought I knew it, but he slowed my game down and made me think like a point guard and how to be a leader." He was named American Athletic Conference Men's Basketball Player of the Year. He scored 24 points in the NCAA Tournament game versus UCLA. After a controversial goaltending call gave the Bruins a one-point lead with 13 seconds to go, Moore missed two shots to ensure a 60–59 win for UCLA.

On February 1, 2016, he was named one of 10 finalists for the Bob Cousy Point Guard of the Year Award. He was named to the 35-man midseason watchlist for the Naismith Trophy on February 11.

== Professional career ==
On July 8, 2016, Moore signed with Italian club New Basket Brindisi for the 2016–17 season.

On July 6, 2017, Moore signed with the French team Nanterre 92 for the 2017–18 season. On November 7, 2017, he left Nanterre and returned to New Basket Brindisi. He averaged 13 points per game with the club. Moore signed with Virtus Roma on June 29, 2018.

On March 1, 2021, he joined S.L. Benfica of the LPB in Portugal.

On July 28, 2021, he has signed with MKS Dąbrowa Górnicza of the Polish Basketball League (PLK).

On November 4, 2021, he has signed with Boulazac Basket Dordogne of the LNB Pro B.

== International career ==
Moore competed on behalf of the United States in the 2015 World University Games, playing with mainly Kansas Jayhawks players. He averaged 6.8 points and 3.0 rebounds per game. Moore started all eight games for Team USA and helped the team go 8-0 and win a gold medal.
