= Caleb Mills (basketball) =

American basketball player (born 2000)

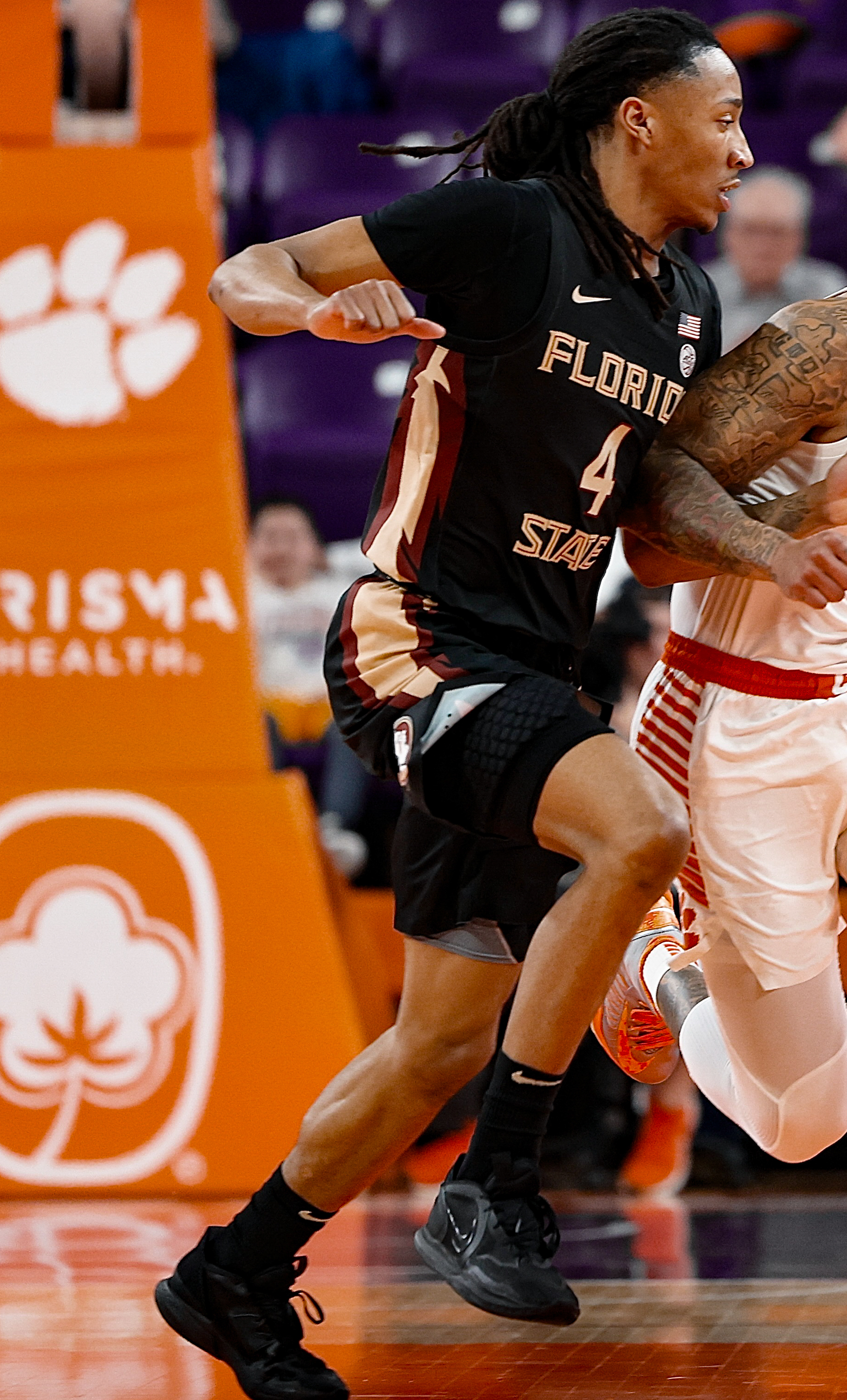
- Mills with Florida State in 2023

No. 21 – Laketown Squadron
- Position: Point guard / shooting guard
- League: NBA G League

Personal information
- Born: July 24, 2000 (age 26) Arden, North Carolina, U.S.
- Listed height: 6 ft 5 in (1.96 m)
- Listed weight: 185 lb (84 kg)

Career information
- High school: Asheville Christian Academy (Swannanoa, North Carolina)
- College: Houston (2018–2021); Florida State (2021–2023); Memphis (2023–2024)
- NBA draft: 2024: undrafted
- Playing career: 2025–present

Career history
- 2025–2026: Rip City Remix
- 2026–present: Birmingham/Laketown Squadron

Career highlights
- Second-team All-AAC (2020); AAC All-Rookie Team (2020)

Caleb Demond Mills (born July 24, 2000) is an American basketball player for the Birmingham Squadron of the NBA G League. He played college basketball for the Memphis Tigers of the American Athletic Conference (AAC). He previously also played for the Houston Cougars and the Florida State Seminoles.

== High school career ==
Mills attended Asheville Christian Academy in Swannanoa, North Carolina. As a junior, he travelled with his team to a tournament in the Canary Islands, averaging 25.3 points per game in three games and earning tournament MVP honors. Mills was also named to the All-Southeast Super Region Team. For his senior year, he transferred to T. C. Roberson High School in Asheville, North Carolina, where he did not play basketball, to graduate a semester early. Mills competed for PSB Elite on the Amateur Athletic Union circuit. On August 6, 2018, he committed to playing college basketball for Houston over offers from Clemson, Florida State, Georgia Tech, Tennessee and Wake Forest, among others. Mills was considered a four-star recruit by ESPN and Rivals, ranked the No. 117 recruit in his class and sixth in North Carolina. Head coach Kelvin Sampson called him the best offensive player he had ever recruited to Houston.

== College career ==
Mills joined Houston at the semester break in January 2019, following his early high school graduation. He sat out his first season as a redshirt but practiced with the team and against backcourt starters Corey Davis Jr., Galen Robinson Jr. and Armoni Brooks. On February 19, 2020, Mills scored a freshman season-high 27 points, including 22 in the second half, in a 76–43 win over Tulsa. He scored his team's first 19 points of the second half. As a freshman, he mainly came off the bench and averaged a team-high 13.2 points per game, earning Second Team All-American Athletic Conference (AAC) and AAC All-Rookie Team honors. Mills became the first Houston freshman to make the all-conference first or second team since Clyde Drexler, while joining Rob Williams as the only freshmen in program history to lead their team in scoring. He was named preseason AAC Player of the Year before his sophomore season. Mills suffered an ankle injury early in the season and came off the bench through four games. On January 5, 2021, he transferred from Houston.

On January 12, 2021, Mills transferred to Florida State. He averaged 12.7 points, 2.4 rebounds and 2.3 assists per game as a junior. As a senior, Mills averaged 13.0 points, 3.4 assists, and 3.0 rebounds per game. Following the season he transferred to Memphis. At Memphis, Mills averaged 7.9 points and 3.1 rebounds per game. On January 4, 2024, he suffered a season-ending knee injury in a game against Tulsa.

== Career statistics ==
Legend
GP	Games played	GS	Games started	MPG	Minutes per game
FG%	Field goal percentage	3P%	3-point field goal percentage	FT%	Free throw percentage
RPG	Rebounds per game	APG	Assists per game	SPG	Steals per game
BPG	Blocks per game	PPG	Points per game	**Bold**	Career high

=== College ===
Year	Team	GP	GS	MPG	FG%	3P%	FT%	RPG	APG	SPG	BPG	PPG
2018–19	Houston	Redshirt										
2019–20	Houston	31	7	22.5	.385	.365	.753	2.6	1.1	.5	.2	**13.2**
2020–21	Houston	4	0	19.0	**.448**	.250	**1.000**	1.3	.3	1.3	.0	9.8
2021–22	Florida State	26	23	26.3	.433	.353	.855	2.4	2.4	**1.5**	.5	12.7
2022–23	Florida State	**32**	**31**	**29.6**	.410	.294	.836	3.0	**3.4**	1.3	**.6**	13.0
2023-24	Memphis	14	5	24.2	.386	**.367**	.727	**3.1**	1.4	.8	.4	7.9
Career		107	66	25.7	.407	.341	.809	2.7	2.1	1.1	.4	12.2
