= Izaiyah Nelson =

American basketball player (born 2003)

No. 25 – Orlando Magic
- Position: Power forward
- Conference: NBA

Personal information
- Born: October 1, 2003 (age 23) Marietta, Georgia, U.S.
- Listed height: 6 ft 10 in (2.08 m)
- Listed weight: 218 lb (99 kg)

Career information
- High school: Marietta (Marietta, Georgia)
- College: Arkansas State (2022–2025); South Florida (2025–2026)
- NBA draft: 2026: 2nd round, 51st overall pick
- Drafted by: Washington Wizards
- Playing career: 2026–present

Career history
- 2026–present: Orlando Magic
- 2026–present: →Osceola Magic

Career highlights
- American Conference Player of the Year (2026); First-team All-American Conference (2026); Third-team All-Sun Belt (2025)
- Stats at NBA.com
- Stats at Basketball Reference

Izaiyah Etron Nelson (born October 1, 2003) is an American basketball player for the Orlando Magic of the National Basketball Association (NBA), on a two-way contract with the Osceola Magic of the NBA G League. He played college basketball for the Arkansas State Red Wolves and South Florida Bulls.

== High school career ==
Nelson attended Marietta High School. He played football before becoming more serious about basketball as a sophomore in high school. Nelson averaged 8.6 points, 8.2 rebounds, 1.1 steals, and 1.0 blocks per game as a senior. He committed to play college basketball at Arkansas State.

== College career ==
Nelson played three years at Arkansas State under coach Bryan Hodgson. He averaged 9.8 points and 7.6 rebounds per game as a sophomore. As a junior, he averaged 10.6 points, 8.9 rebounds, 0.7 steals, and 1.3 blocks per game and was named to the Third Team All-Sun Belt. Following the season, he followed coach Hodgson to South Florida. As a senior, Nelson was named the American Conference Player of the Year, defensive player of the year and newcomer of the year. He averaged 15.8 points and 9.8 rebounds per game.

== Professional career ==
On June 24, 2026, Nelson was selected with the 51st overall pick by the Washington Wizards in the 2026 NBA draft and was subsequently traded to the Orlando Magic. Nelson signed a two-way contract with the Magic on July 1. On July 13, it was announced that Nelson would require surgery to repair a left ankle fracture suffered in a Summer League contest.
