= 2020–21 Houston Cougars men's basketball team =

American college basketball season

2020–21 Houston Cougars men's basketball

AAC tournament champions

NCAA tournament, Final Four
- Conference: American Athletic Conference

Ranking
- Coaches: No. 3
- AP: No. 6
- Record: 28–4 (14–3 AAC)
- Head coach: Kelvin Sampson (7th season)
- Assistant coaches: Alvin Brooks; Kellen Sampson; Quannas White
- Home arena: Fertitta Center

2020–21 American Athletic Conference men's basketball standings
	Conf.				Overall
Team	W		L	PCT	W		L	PCT
Wichita State	11	–	2	.846	16	–	6	.727
No. 6 Houston †	14	–	3	.824	28	–	4	.875
Memphis	11	–	4	.733	20	–	8	.714
SMU	7	–	4	.636	11	–	6	.647
Cincinnati	8	–	6	.571	12	–	11	.522
UCF	8	–	10	.444	11	–	12	.478
Tulsa	7	–	9	.438	11	–	12	.478
South Florida	4	–	10	.286	9	–	13	.409
Temple	4	–	10	.286	5	–	11	.313
Tulane	4	–	12	.250	10	–	13	.435
East Carolina	2	–	10	.167	8	–	11	.421
† 2021 AAC tournament winner Rankings from AP poll

The 2020–21 Houston Cougars men's basketball team represented the University of Houston during the 2020–21 NCAA Division I men's basketball season. The Cougars were led by seventh-year head coach Kelvin Sampson as members of the American Athletic Conference. It was the third season that the team played its home games at the Fertitta Center. They won their first ever AAC tournament to clinch an auto-bid to the NCAA tournament, where they were selected as a #2 seed in the Midwest Region. The team advanced to the Final Four for the first time since 1984. They eventually lost to Baylor in the Final Four who went on to become the national champions that season.

== Previous season ==
Houston finished the 2019–20 regular season 23–8, 13–5 in AAC play, finishing tied for first place and winning a share of the regular season title. They entered as the No. 2 seed in the AAC tournament, which was ultimately cancelled due to the COVID-19 pandemic.

== Offseason ==
=== Departures ===
Name	Number	Pos.	Height	Weight	Year	Hometown	Reason for departure
Chris Harris Jr.	1	C	6'10"	255	Senior	Houston, TX	Graduated
Nate Hinton	11	G	6'5"	210	Sophomore	Gastonia, NC	Play professionally
Cedrick Alley Jr.	23	F	6'6"	225	RS Sophomore	Houston, TX	Transferred to UTSA

=== Incoming transfers ===
Name	Pos.	Height	Weight	Year	Hometown	Notes
Reggie Chaney	F	6'8"	225	Junior	Tulsa, OK	Transferred from Arkansas. Chaney was granted a waiver for immediate eligibility. Initially had two years of remaining eligibility, but automatically received a third year after the NCAA ruled that the 2020–21 season would not be counted against the eligibility of any basketball player.

=== 2020 recruiting class ===
College recruiting information
Name	Hometown	School	Height	Weight	Commit date
Tramon Mark; PG	Dickinson, TX	Dickinson High School	6 ft 4 in (1.93 m)	180 lb (82 kg)	Apr 17, 2019
Tramon Mark; PG	Recruit ratings: Rivals: 247Sports: (83)				
Jamal Shead; PG	Manor, TX	Manor High School	6 ft 1 in (1.85 m)	175 lb (79 kg)	May 27, 2019
Jamal Shead; PG	Recruit ratings: Rivals: 247Sports: (80)				
Kiyron Powell; C	Evansville, IN	Benjamin Bosse High School	6 ft 9 in (2.06 m)	205 lb (93 kg)	Aug 6, 2019
Kiyron Powell; C	Recruit ratings: Rivals: 247Sports: (76)				
Overall recruit ranking: 247Sports: 27
Note: In many cases, Scout, Rivals, 247Sports, On3, and ESPN may conflict in their listings of height and weight.; In these cases, the average was taken. ESPN grades are on a 100-point scale.; Sources: "2020 Team Ranking". Rivals.

Houston also added preferred walk-on Ryan Elvin, a 6'0" point guard from Cedar Ridge High School in Round Rock, Texas.

=== 2021 Recruiting class ===
College recruiting information (2021)
Name	Hometown	School	Height	Weight	Commit date
Ramon Walker; SF	Pearland, TX	Shadow Creek High School	6 ft 5 in (1.96 m)	195 lb (88 kg)	May 20, 2020
Ramon Walker; SF	Recruit ratings: Rivals: 247Sports: (76)				
Robbie Armbrester; PF	Atlanta, GA	Wasatch Academy	6 ft 6 in (1.98 m)	215 lb (98 kg)	Sep 7, 2020
Robbie Armbrester; PF	Recruit ratings: Rivals: 247Sports: (77)				
Ja'Vier Francis; C	Montverde, FL	Montverde Academy	6 ft 8 in (2.03 m)	200 lb (91 kg)	Sep 27, 2020
Ja'Vier Francis; C	Recruit ratings: Rivals: 247Sports: (78)				
Overall recruit ranking: 247Sports: 29
Note: In many cases, Scout, Rivals, 247Sports, On3, and ESPN may conflict in their listings of height and weight.; In these cases, the average was taken. ESPN grades are on a 100-point scale.; Sources: "2021 Team Ranking". Rivals.

== Preseason ==
=== AAC preseason media poll ===
On October 28, The American released the preseason Poll and other preseason awards

Coaches Poll
Predicted finish	Team	Votes (1st place)
1	Houston	99 (9)
2	Memphis	90 (2)
3	SMU	80
4	Cincinnati	77
5	South Florida	61
6	Tulsa	50
7	Wichita State	44
8	UCF	37
9	East Carolina	34
10	Temple	18
11	Tulane	15

=== Preseason Awards ===
- AAC Preseason Player of the Year - Caleb Mills
- All-AAC First Team - Caleb Mills

== Roster ==
2020–21 Houston Cougars men's basketball team
Players
Coaches

Pos.	#	Name	Height	Weight	Year	Previous school	Hometown
G	0	Marcus Sasser	6 ft 1 in (1.85 m)	190 lb (86 kg)	So	Red Oak HS	Red Oak, TX
G	1	Jamal Shead	6 ft 1 in (1.85 m)	190 lb (86 kg)	Fr	Manor HS	Manor, TX
G	2	Caleb Mills (T)	6 ft 3 in (1.91 m)	180 lb (82 kg)	RS So	T. C. Roberson HS	Arden, NC
G	3	DeJon Jarreau	6 ft 5 in (1.96 m)	185 lb (84 kg)	RS Sr	UMass	New Orleans, LA
F	4	Justin Gorham	6 ft 7 in (2.01 m)	225 lb (102 kg)	RS Sr	Towson	Baltimore, MD
G	5	Cameron Tyson	6 ft 2 in (1.88 m)	190 lb (86 kg)	RS So	Idaho	Bothell, WA
G	12	Tramon Mark	6 ft 5 in (1.96 m)	180 lb (82 kg)	Fr	Dickinson HS	Dickinson, TX
F	13	J'Wan Roberts	6 ft 7 in (2.01 m)	220 lb (100 kg)	RS Fr	Shoemaker HS	Saint Thomas, USVI
G	20	Ryan Elvin (W)	6 ft 0 in (1.83 m)	155 lb (70 kg)	Fr	Cedar Ridge HS	Round Rock, TX
G	24	Quentin Grimes	6 ft 5 in (1.96 m)	205 lb (93 kg)	Jr	Kansas	The Woodlands, TX
C	30	Caleb Broodo (W)	6 ft 8 in (2.03 m)	240 lb (109 kg)	RS Jr	Dow HS	Midland, MI
F	32	Reggie Chaney	6 ft 8 in (2.03 m)	225 lb (102 kg)	Jr	Arkansas	Tulsa, OK
F	35	Fabian White Jr.	6 ft 8 in (2.03 m)	225 lb (102 kg)	Sr	Atascocita HS	Atascocita, TX
C	52	Kiyron Powell	6 ft 9 in (2.06 m)	205 lb (93 kg)	Fr	Benjamin Bosse HS	Evansville, IN
F/C	55	Brison Gresham	6 ft 8 in (2.03 m)	230 lb (104 kg)	RS Sr	UMass	New Orleans, LA

Head coach

- Kelvin Sampson (UNC Pembroke)

Assistant coach(es)

- Alvin Brooks (Lamar)
- Kellen Sampson (Oklahoma)
- Quannas White (Oklahoma)

Legend

- (C) Team captain
- (S) Suspended
- (I) Ineligible
- (W) Walk-on
- (T) Transferred
- Injured
- Current redshirt

Roster
Last update: November 10, 2020

- May 27, 2020 – Fabian White Jr. suffered a torn ACL, leading him to sit out before returning for the February 18th game.
- January 5, 2021 – Caleb Mills entered the transfer portal. Mills would eventually transfer to Florida State.

== Schedule and results ==
=== COVID-19 impact ===
Due to the ongoing COVID-19 pandemic, the Cougars' schedule was subject to change, including the cancellation or postponement of individual games, the cancellation of the entire season, or games played either with minimal fans or without fans in attendance and just essential personnel.

- The Cougars began a home-and-home series with LSU and Alabama beginning in the 2020–2021. Both were eventually postponed due to the pandemic.
- Houston added a game vs. Our Lady of the Lake on February 6.
- The game @ Cincinnati originally scheduled for February 21 was moved to Houston.
- Houston added a game vs. Western Kentucky on February 25.
- The game @ Memphis originally scheduled for March 7 was moved to Houston, after COVID-related issues with Memphis forced the first scheduled matchup between the teams scheduled for February 14 to be postponed.

=== Schedule ===
Date time, TV	Rank^{#}	Opponent^{#}	Result	Record	High points	High rebounds	High assists	Site (attendance) city, state
Regular season
November 25, 2020*; 2:00 p.m., ESPN+	No. 17	Lamar	W 89–45	1–0	25 – Sasser	8 – Mark	4 – Grimes	Fertitta Center (1,859); Houston, TX
November 27, 2020*; 2:00 p.m., ESPN+	No. 17	Boise State; Southwest Showcase	W 68–58	2–0	25 – Grimes	14 – Roberts	2 – Sasser	Fertitta Center (1,859); Houston, TX
November 29, 2020*; 4:00 p.m., ESPN	No. 17	vs. No. 14 Texas Tech; Southwest Showcase	W 64–53	3–0	17 – Sasser	9 – Jarreau	5 – Jarreau	Dickies Arena (3,568); Fort Worth, TX
December 5, 2020*; 5:00 p.m., ESPN+	No. 10	South Carolina; American/SEC Alliance	W 77–67	4–0	23 – Grimes	8 – Jarreau	3 – Tied	Fertitta Center (1,859); Houston, TX
December 9, 2020*; 7:00 p.m., ESPN+	No. 7	Sam Houston State	Postponed due to COVID-19 issues					Fertitta Center; Houston, TX
December 12, 2020*; 1:00 p.m., ESPN+	No. 7	Rice	Postponed due to COVID-19 issues					Fertitta Center; Houston, TX
December 20, 2020*; 3:00 p.m., ESPN+	No. 6	Alcorn State	W 88–55	5–0	27 – Grimes	15 – Gorham	7 – Jarreau	Fertitta Center (1,859); Houston, TX
December 22, 2020; 7:00 p.m., ESPN+	No. 6	Temple	W 76–50	6–0 (1–0)	22 – Grimes	12 – Gorham	4 – Tied	Fertitta Center (1,859); Houston, TX
December 26, 2020; 12:00 p.m., ABC	No. 6	at UCF; Previously scheduled for Dec. 15	W 63–54	7–0 (2–0)	19 – Sasser	5 – Tied	5 – Jarreau	Addition Financial Arena (1,476); Orlando, FL
December 29, 2020; 8:00 p.m., ESPN2	No. 5	at Tulsa	L 64–65	7–1 (2–1)	19 – Grimes	7 – Grimes	4 – Grimes	Reynolds Center; Tulsa, OK
January 3, 2021; 6:00 p.m., ESPN2	No. 5	at SMU; Rivalry	W 74–60	8–1 (3–1)	17 – Sasser	19 – Gorham	5 – Jarreau	Moody Coliseum; University Park, TX
January 6, 2021; 7:00 p.m., ESPN+	No. 11	Wichita State	W 70–63	9–1 (4–1)	22 – Grimes	10 – Tied	5 – Jarreau	Fertitta Center (1,859); Houston, TX
January 9, 2021; 7:00 p.m., ESPNU	No. 11	Tulane	W 71–50	10–1 (5–1)	28 – Sasser	11 – Gorham	3 – Tied	Fertitta Center (1,859); Houston, TX
January 17, 2021; 1:00 p.m., ESPNU	No. 11	UCF	W 75–58	11–1 (6–1)	18 – Grimes	9 – Gorham	5 – Jarreau	Fertitta Center (1,859); Houston, TX
January 20, 2021; 7:00 p.m., ESPN+	No. 8	Tulsa	W 86–59	12–1 (7–1)	26 – Sasser	11 – Gorham	5 – Tied	Fertitta Center (1,859); Houston, TX
January 23, 2021; 11:00 a.m., CBS	No. 8	Cincinnati	Postponed due to COVID-19 issues					Fertitta Center; Houston, TX
January 23, 2021; 11:00 a.m., CBS	No. 8	at Temple; Previously scheduled for Feb. 8	W 68–51	13–1 (8–1)	15 – Tied	10 – Gorham	6 – Jarreau	Liacouras Center; Philadelphia, PA
January 28, 2021; 8:00 p.m., ESPN	No. 6	at Tulane	W 83–60	14–1 (9–1)	31 – Tyson	15 – Gorham	4 – Tied	Devlin Fieldhouse; New Orleans, LA
January 31, 2021; 12:00 p.m., ESPN	No. 6	SMU; Rivalry	W 70–48	15–1 (10–1)	19 – Sasser	17 – Gorham	5 – Jarreau	Fertitta Center (1,728); Houston, TX
February 3, 2021; 5:00 p.m., ESPN+	No. 5	at East Carolina	L 73–82	15–2 (10–2)	25 – Jarreau	11 – Gorham	5 – Jarreau	Williams Arena (78); Greenville, NC
February 6, 2021*; 2:00 p.m., ESPN+	No. 5	Our Lady of the Lake	W 112–46	16–2 (10–2)	32 – Tyson	12 – Powell	11 – Shead	Fertitta Center (1,859); Houston, TX
February 10, 2021; 6:00 p.m., ESPNU	No. 8	at South Florida; Previously scheduled for Jan. 14	W 82–65	17–2 (11–2)	29 – Grimes	8 – Gorham	8 – Jarreau	Yuengling Center (629); Tampa, FL
February 14, 2021; 12:00 p.m., ESPN	No. 8	Memphis	Postponed due to COVID-19 issues					Fertitta Center; Houston, TX
February 17, 2021; ESPN+	No. 6	East Carolina	Postponed due to COVID-19 issues					Fertitta Center; Houston, TX
February 18, 2021; 6:00 p.m., ESPN2	No. 6	at Wichita State; Previously scheduled for Feb. 25	L 63–68	17–3 (11–3)	16 – Jarreau	7 – Gorham	3 – Jarreau	Charles Koch Arena (2,625); Wichita, KS
February 21, 2021; 12:00 p.m., ESPN	No. 6	Cincinnati	W 90–52	18–3 (12–3)	20 – Grimes	9 – White Jr.	3 – Tied	Fertitta Center (1,859); Houston, TX
February 25, 2021*; 6:00 p.m., ESPN2	No. 12	Western Kentucky	W 81–57	19–3	33 – Grimes	8 – Gorham	5 – Gorham	Fertitta Center (1,859); Houston, TX
February 28, 2021; 3:00 p.m., ESPNU	No. 12	South Florida	W 98–52	20–3 (13–3)	22 – Grimes	8 – Jarreau	7 – Sasser	Fertitta Center (1,859); Houston, TX
March 7, 2021; 11:00 a.m., CBS	No. 9	Memphis	W 67–64	21–3 (14–3)	19 – Jarreau	12 – Gorham	3 – Jarreau	Fertitta Center (1,859); Houston, TX
AAC Tournament
March 12, 2021; 6:00 p.m., ESPN2	(2) No. 7	vs. (10) Tulane; Quarterfinals	W 77–52	22–3	15 – Tied	10 – Jarreau	10 – Jarreau	Dickies Arena; Fort Worth, TX
March 13, 2021; 5:00 p.m., ESPN2	(2) No. 7	vs. (3) Memphis; Semifinals	W 76–74	23–3	21 – Grimes	7 – Gorham	3 – Jarreau	Dickies Arena (1,182); Fort Worth, TX
March 14, 2021; 2:15 p.m., ESPN	(2) No. 7	vs. (5) Cincinnati; Championship	W 91–54	24–3	21 – Grimes	6 – White Jr.	7 – Tied	Dickies Arena; Fort Worth, TX
NCAA tournament
March 19, 2021; 6:15 p.m., truTV	(2 MW) No. 6	vs. (15 MW) Cleveland State; First Round	W 87–56	25–3	18 – Grimes	7 – Chaney	4 – Grimes	Simon Skjodt Assembly Hall; Bloomington, IN
March 21, 2021; 6:10 p.m., TBS	(2 MW) No. 6	vs. (10 MW) Rutgers; Second Round	W 63–60	26–3	22 – Grimes	9 – Grimes	4 – Gorham	Lucas Oil Stadium; Indianapolis, IN
March 27, 2021; 9:00 p.m., TBS	(2 MW) No. 6	vs. (11 MW) Syracuse; Sweet Sixteen	W 62–46	27–3	14 – Grimes	10 – Gorham	8 – Jarreau	Hinkle Fieldhouse; Indianapolis, IN
March 29, 2021; 6:15 p.m., CBS	(2 MW) No. 6	vs. (12 MW) Oregon State; Elite Eight	W 67–61	28–3	20 – Sasser	10 – Gorham	8 – Jarreau	Lucas Oil Stadium; Indianapolis, IN
April 3, 2021; 4:14 p.m., CBS	(2 MW) No. 6	vs. (1 S) No. 3 Baylor; Final Four	L 59–78	28–4	20 – Sasser	6 – Gorham	3 – Gorham	Lucas Oil Stadium; Indianapolis, IN
*Non-conference game. ^{#}Rankings from AP Poll. (#) Tournament seedings in parentheses. MW=Midwest region. S=South region. All times are in Central Time.

== Rankings ==
Ranking movements Legend: ██ Increase in ranking ██ Decrease in ranking т = Tied with team above or below
	Week																	
Poll	Pre	1	2	3	4	5	6	7	8	9	10	11	12	13	14	15	16	Final
AP	17	10	7	6	6	5	11	11	8	6	5	8	6	12	9	7	6	Not released
Coaches	18T	18T^	8	8	7	5	11	11	8	6	5	7	5T	10	7	7	6	3

*AP does not release post-NCAA Tournament rankings
^Coaches did not release a Week 1 poll

== Awards and honors ==
=== All-American ===
- Quentin Grimes – AP (3rd), USBWA (3rd), NABC (3rd), SN (3rd)

=== John McLendon Award ===
- Kelvin Sampson

=== American Athletic Conference honors ===
==== All-AAC Awards ====
- Player of the Year: Quentin Grimes
- Defensive Player of the Year: DeJon Jarreau
- Most Improved Player: Justin Gorham

==== All-AAC First Team ====
- Quentin Grimes

==== All-AAC Second Team ====
- DeJon Jarreau
- Justin Gorham
- Marcus Sasser
