= Kendric Davis =

American basketball player (born 1999)

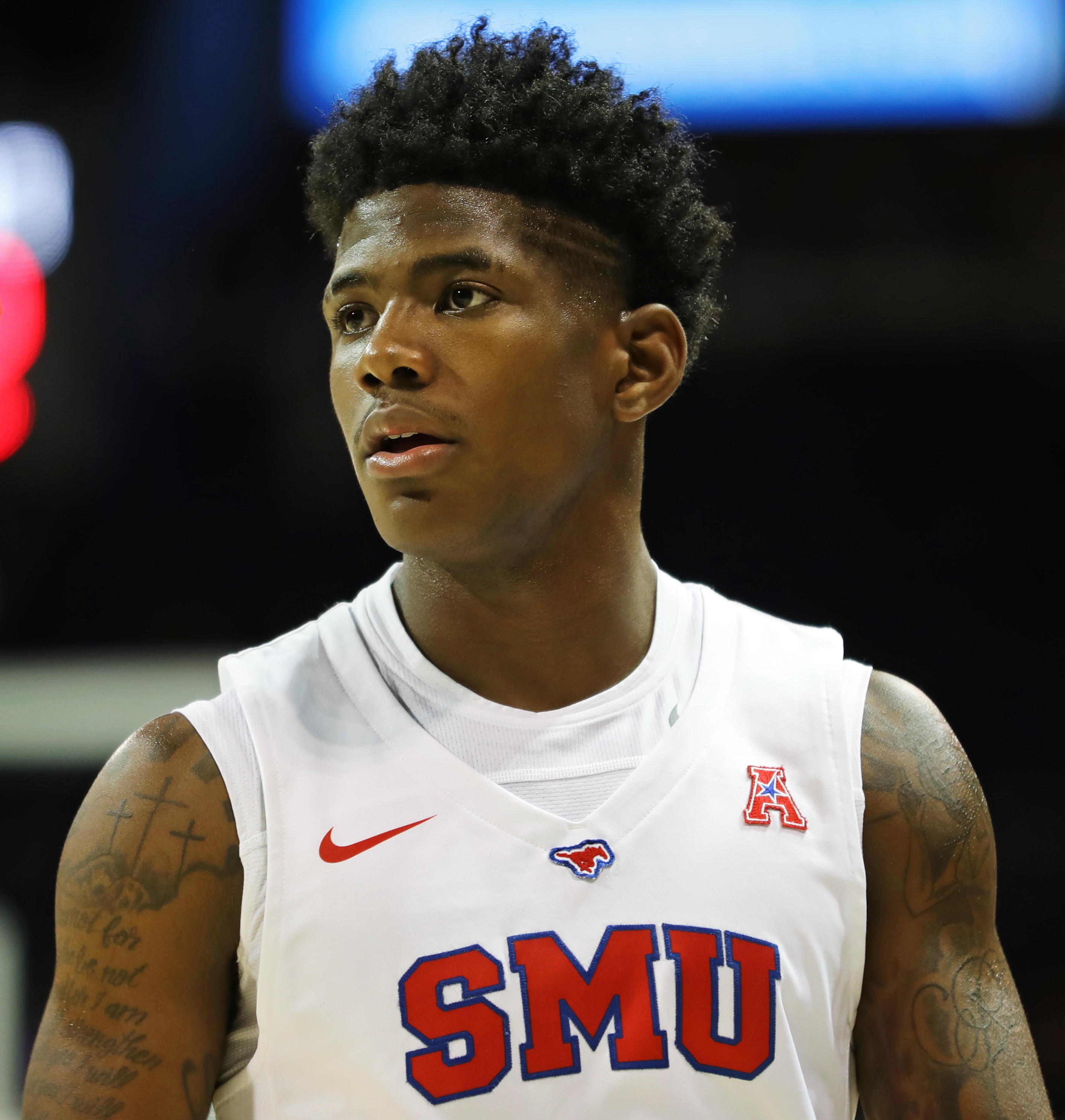
- Davis with SMU in 2019

No. 1 – Sydney Kings
- Position: Point guard
- League: NBL

Personal information
- Born: May 14, 1999 (age 27) Houston, Texas, U.S.
- Listed height: 5 ft 11 in (180 cm)
- Listed weight: 183 lb (83 kg)

Career information
- High school: Sam Houston (Houston, Texas)
- College: TCU (2018–2019); SMU (2019–2022); Memphis (2022–2023)
- NBA draft: 2023: undrafted
- Playing career: 2023–present

Career history
- 2023–2024: Santa Cruz Warriors
- 2024–2025: Adelaide 36ers
- 2025: Nanjing Monkey Kings
- 2025–present: Sydney Kings
- 2026: Osos de Manatí

Career highlights
- NBL champion (2026); NBL Championship Series MVP (2026); 2× All-NBL First Team (2025, 2026); NBA G League All-Rookie Team (2024); NBA G League Next Up Game (2024); Third-team All-American – SN (2023); AAC Player of the Year (2022); 3× First-team All-AAC (2021–2023); Third-team All-AAC (2020); AAC tournament MVP (2023)
- Stats at NBA.com
- Stats at Basketball Reference

Kendric Davis (born May 14, 1999) is an American professional basketball player for the Sydney Kings of the National Basketball League (NBL). He played college basketball for the TCU Horned Frogs, SMU Mustangs, and Memphis Tigers. In 2026, he helped the Kings win the NBL championship while earning the Championship Series MVP.

== High school career ==
Davis attended Sam Houston Math, Science, and Technology Center in Houston, Texas. He joined the varsity basketball team in his freshman season. As a senior, Davis averaged 22.6 points and 6.6 assists per game. He graduated as a two-time Class 6A All-State selection and a three-time 20-6A District MVP. A four-star recruit, Davis committed to playing college basketball for TCU over Kansas State and Texas.

== College career ==
On February 9, 2019, Davis scored a freshman season-high 22 points for TCU in a 92–83 win over Iowa State. As a freshman, he averaged 6.3 points, two assists, and 1.7 rebounds per game in a reserve role. After the season, Davis transferred to SMU. His waiver for immediate eligibility was initially denied. After filing an appeal and sitting out for four games, his waiver was approved, largely because TCU supported the waiver. On January 4, 2020, Davis recorded a sophomore season-high 24 points and six assists in a 92–81 overtime victory over Vanderbilt. On February 1, he posted 18 points, 13 assists and nine rebounds, tying the American Athletic Conference (AAC) single-game assists record, in an 82–67 win over Tulane. As a sophomore, Davis averaged 14.2 points, an AAC-leading 6.7 assists and 4.1 rebounds per game, earning Third Team All-AAC honors. In June 2020, he tested positive for COVID-19 after returning to SMU for voluntary workouts. In his junior season debut on November 25, Davis scored a career-high 33 points in a 97–67 win against Sam Houston State. On January 7, 2021, he set an AAC record with 14 assists while scoring 14 points in a 76–69 loss to Cincinnati.

At the conclusion of the 2021–22 season, Davis was named the AAC Player of the Year. He averaged 19.4 points, 3.8 rebounds and 4.4 assists per game while shooting 37.2% from three-point range. Following the season, Davis transferred to Memphis for his final season of eligibility. On January 23, 2023, he scored 26 points in an 80–68 win against Tulsa and surpassed the 2,000-point threshold.

== Professional career ==
=== Santa Cruz Warriors (2023–2024) ===
After going undrafted in the 2023 NBA draft, Davis joined the Golden State Warriors for the 2023 NBA Summer League. On September 28, 2023, he signed with the Warriors, but was waived on October 16. On October 30, he joined the Santa Cruz Warriors of the NBA G League. He played in the NBA G League Next Up Game. In 34 games in 2023–24, he averaged 18.7 points, 4.5 rebounds, 8.3 assists and 1.4 steals per game. He was named to the NBA G League All-Rookie Team.

Davis joined the Portland Trail Blazers for the 2024 NBA Summer League.

=== Adelaide 36ers (2024–2025) ===
On July 18, 2024, Davis signed with the Adelaide 36ers of the Australian National Basketball League (NBL) for the 2024–25 season. On November 25, he was suspended for two games after he inappropriately engaged with a spectator during Adelaide's game against Melbourne United on November 17. In his return game on December 8, he recorded 37 points and 11 assists in a 115–105 loss to the Perth Wildcats. On December 14, he recorded 36 points, nine assists and five rebounds in a 111–94 win over the New Zealand Breakers. On January 10, he recorded 39 points, seven assists and five rebounds in a 104–103 overtime loss to the Tasmania JackJumpers. He finished the regular season with averages of 25.6 points and 8.0 assists per game, as he earned runner-up league MVP and All-NBL First Team honors.

=== Nanjing Monkey Kings (2025) ===
On March 2, 2025, Davis signed with the Nanjing Monkey Kings of the Chinese Basketball Association (CBA) for the rest of the 2024–25 season.

=== Sydney Kings and Osos de Manatí (2025–present) ===
On April 22, 2025, Davis signed with the Sydney Kings for the 2025–26 NBL season. On November 3, 2025, he scored 34 points in a 95–92 win over Melbourne United. On December 12, he scored 38 points in a 108–79 win over the Perth Wildcats. On January 22, 2026, Davis had the best scoring game of his NBL career with 40 points and six 3-pointers alongside eight assists in a 105–94 win over the Tasmania JackJumpers. On February 1, he had 35 points, seven rebounds and six assists in a 106–92 win over the Cairns Taipans. He finished the regular season as runner-up league MVP for the second straight year and earned his second All-NBL First Team selection. In game one of the semi-finals series, Davis scored a game-high 35 points in a 105–104 win over the Wildcats. In game one of the Championship Series, Davis scored a game-high 25 points in a 112–68 win over the Adelaide 36ers. In game three against the 36ers, he recorded game highs of 34 points and 15 assists in a 106–93 win to lift the Kings to a 2–1 series lead. In game five, he scored an equal game-high 35 points to go with 14 assists in a 113–101 overtime win to claim the NBL championship with a 3–2 series victory. He was subsequently named the Championship Series MVP.

On April 21, 2026, Davis signed with the Osos de Manatí of the Baloncesto Superior Nacional in Puerto Rico. In eight games, he averaged 22.8 points, 2.3 rebounds and 4.9 assists per game.

On June 4, 2026, Davis re-signed with the Kings on a two-year deal. On November 15, 2026, he scored 36 points in a 111–102 double-overtime win over the New Zealand Breakers.

== Career statistics ==
Legend
GP	Games played	GS	Games started	MPG	Minutes per game
FG%	Field goal percentage	3P%	3-point field goal percentage	FT%	Free throw percentage
RPG	Rebounds per game	APG	Assists per game	SPG	Steals per game
BPG	Blocks per game	PPG	Points per game	**Bold**	Career high

=== College ===
Year	Team	GP	GS	MPG	FG%	3P%	FT%	RPG	APG	SPG	BPG	PPG
2018–19	TCU	**37**	2	17.1	.409	.319	.706	1.7	2.0	.9	.0	6.3
2019–20	SMU	26	26	34.8	.449	.311	.854	4.1	6.7	1.2	.1	14.2
2020–21	SMU	17	17	34.7	**.481**	**.373**	.833	**4.2**	**7.6**	1.6	.1	19.0
2021–22	SMU	32	32	34.6	.439	.372	**.868**	3.8	4.4	1.5	.1	19.4
2022–23	Memphis	34	**34**	**34.9**	.414	.346	.854	3.7	5.4	**2.0**	**.2**	**21.9**
Career		146	111	30.3	.435	.351	.839	3.3	4.8	1.4	.1	15.7

== Personal life ==
Davis was born in Houston, Texas, as the youngest son of his parents John and Patricia. He was raised in Houston's Greater Fifth Ward neighborhood. While playing for TCU, Davis wore the number five jersey to honor Fifth Ward.

On November 1, 2021, Davis' father, John, disappeared while driving a truck from Houston to Dallas and has not been heard from since.

Davis's brother, Paul Banks III, played college football for Texas Tech. In February 2018, Banks was arrested in connection with ATM robberies and was imprisoned.

Davis has a son who was born in 2021.

Davis has expressed interest in becoming a commentator after his playing career.

== See also ==
- List of NCAA Division I men's basketball career scoring leaders
