= Quentin Grimes =

American basketball player (born 2000)

- Grimes with the Lakers in 2026.

No. 5 – Los Angeles Lakers
- Position: Shooting guard
- League: NBA

Personal information
- Born: May 8, 2000 (age 26) Houston, Texas, U.S.
- Listed height: 6 ft 4 in (1.93 m)
- Listed weight: 207 lb (94 kg)

Career information
- High school: The Woodlands College Park (The Woodlands, Texas)
- College: Kansas (2018–2019); Houston (2019–2021)
- NBA draft: 2021: 1st round, 25th overall pick
- Drafted by: Los Angeles Clippers
- Playing career: 2021–present

Career history
- 2021–2024: New York Knicks
- 2024: Detroit Pistons
- 2024–2025: Dallas Mavericks
- 2025–2026: Philadelphia 76ers
- 2026–present: Los Angeles Lakers

Career highlights
- Third-team All-American – AP, USBWA, NABC, SN (2021); AAC Co-Player of the Year (2021); First-team All-AAC (2021); AAC tournament MVP (2021); McDonald's All-American (2018); Texas Mr. Basketball (2018); FIBA Under-18 Americas Championship MVP (2018)
- Stats at NBA.com
- Stats at Basketball Reference
Medals
Men's basketball
Representing United States
FIBA Under-18 Americas Championship
Gold medal – first place	2018 Canada	Team

Quentin Marshall Grimes (born May 8, 2000) is an American professional basketball player for the Los Angeles Lakers of the National Basketball Association (NBA). He played college basketball for the Kansas Jayhawks and the Houston Cougars.

== High school career ==
Grimes attended The Woodlands College Park High School in The Woodlands, Texas, graduating in 2018. He was the first basketball player in school history to letter on the varsity team and start in all games as a freshman. Over the course of his high school career he earned a weighted 3.38 GPA. During his senior year of high school, Grimes averaged 29.5 points, 8.6 rebounds, 4.9 assists, 1.8 steals and 1.5 blocks per game, and led the College Park Cavaliers to a 21–13 overall record. He left high school with 2,863 points, 854 rebounds, 582 assists, 213 steals and 127 blocks in total. Grimes was named the All-Greater Houston Player of the Year, the Gatorade State Player of the Year, and a McDonald's All-American. Just before entering college, he was projected as a top-5 pick in the 2019 NBA draft.

=== Recruiting ===
On November 15, 2017, he committed to playing college basketball at the University of Kansas, choosing the Jayhawks over offers from Kentucky, Marquette, Texas and eight other schools.

College recruiting
Name	Hometown	School	Height	Weight	Commit date
Quentin Grimes; SG	The Woodlands, TX	The Woodlands College Park (TX)	6 ft 5 in (1.96 m)	200 lb (91 kg)	Nov 15, 2017
Quentin Grimes; SG	Recruit ratings: Rivals: 247Sports: ESPN: (94)				
Overall recruit ranking: Rivals: 8 247Sports: 13 ESPN: 8
Note: In many cases, Scout, Rivals, 247Sports, On3, and ESPN may conflict in their listings of height and weight.; In these cases, the average was taken. ESPN grades are on a 100-point scale.; Sources: "Kansas 2018 Basketball Commitments". Rivals.; "2018 Kansas Jayhawks Recruiting Class". ESPN.; "2018 Team Ranking". Rivals.

== College career ==
=== Kansas ===
In his first college game, Grimes had 21 points and six three-pointers against Michigan State. As a freshman at Kansas, Grimes averaged 8.4 points, 2.5 rebounds and 2.0 assists per game, shooting 34 percent from the three-point line and 38.4 percent from the field. After the season, he declared for the 2019 NBA draft but withdrew before the deadline and decided to transfer to Houston.

=== Houston ===
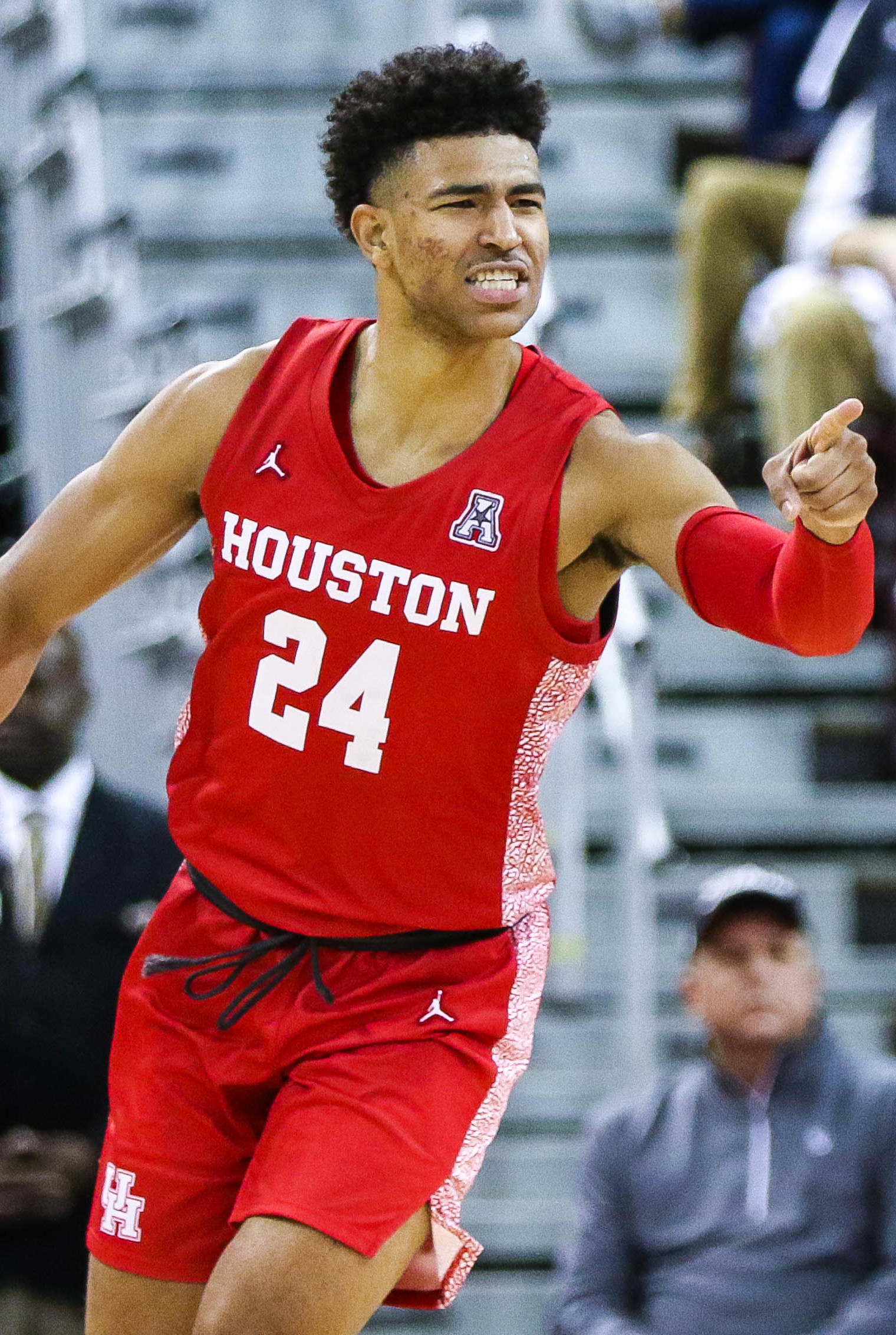
Grimes with the Houston Cougars in 2019

Grimes was granted a waiver and was eligible to play for Houston immediately instead of sitting out a season. On November 19, 2019, he scored a sophomore season-high 32 points to help beat Rice, 97–89. Grimes scored 21 points and pulled down six rebounds versus Texas State on December 4 and had 24 points and four rebounds in a road victory at South Carolina on December 8. He was named American Athletic Conference (AAC) player of the week on December 9. As a sophomore, Grimes averaged 12.1 points, 2.6 assists and 3.7 rebounds per game.

On February 25, 2021, Grimes scored a career-high 33 points and made eight three-pointers in an 81–57 win against Western Kentucky. He was selected as AAC tournament MVP after scoring 21 points in a 91–54 win over Cincinnati in the final. He led Houston to the Final Four at the 2021 NCAA tournament. As a junior, Grimes averaged 17.8 points, 2.0 assists and 5.7 rebounds per game, sharing AAC Player of the Year honors with Tyson Etienne. On April 9, he announced that he would declare for the 2021 NBA draft and forgo his remaining college eligibility.

== Professional career ==
=== New York Knicks (2021–2024) ===
Grimes was selected with the 25th pick in the 2021 NBA draft by the Los Angeles Clippers and then traded to the New York Knicks, along with a 2024 second-round draft pick, for Keon Johnson. On August 6, 2021, the Knicks announced they signed Grimes. In his first career start, Grimes scored 27 points and made seven three-pointers along with three rebounds and three assists in a loss to the Milwaukee Bucks.

Grimes joined the Knicks' 2022 NBA Summer League roster. He and the Knicks made it to the Summer League Championship, but lost to the Portland Trail Blazers with a score of 77–85. Grimes led the Knicks in points, scoring nineteen points. On July 18, 2022, Grimes was named to the All-NBA Summer League First Team.

=== Detroit Pistons (2024) ===
On February 8, 2024, Grimes, Ryan Arcidiacono, Malachi Flynn, Evan Fournier and two second-round picks were traded to the Detroit Pistons in exchange for Bojan Bogdanović and Alec Burks.

=== Dallas Mavericks (2024–2025) ===
On July 6, 2024, Grimes was traded to the Dallas Mavericks in exchange for Tim Hardaway Jr. and three future second-round picks.

=== Philadelphia 76ers (2025–2026) ===
On February 4, 2025, Grimes was traded to the Philadelphia 76ers alongside a 2025 second-round pick in exchange for Caleb Martin. Grimes scored a then-career-high 44 points against the Golden State Warriors on March 1. He bested that on March 17 with a then career-high 46 points, with a then career-high eight three-point field goals made and a career-high 13 rebounds. In 28 appearances (25 starts) for Philadelphia, Grimes averaged 21.9 points, 5.2 rebounds, and 4.5 assists.

On October 1, 2025, Grimes re-signed with the 76ers on a one-year, $8.7 million contract.

=== Los Angeles Lakers (2026–present) ===
On July 7, 2026, Grimes signed a four-year, $60 million contract with the Los Angeles Lakers.

Grimes made his Lakers debut on October 21, 2026, recording 10 points and four assists in a 127–105 win over the Golden State Warriors. On November 17, Grimes poured in a career high of 47 points with a career-high 10 three-pointers made in a 118-114 overtime victory against the Charlotte Hornets, including a game-tying 3-pointer (his 10th) to send the game into overtime.

== National team career ==
Right after graduating from high school, Grimes was selected to represent the United States at the 2018 FIBA Americas U18 Championship for Men in June 2018 as part of the U18 national team. The USA won gold and Grimes was named MVP.

== Career statistics ==
Legend
GP	Games played	GS	Games started	MPG	Minutes per game
FG%	Field goal percentage	3P%	3-point field goal percentage	FT%	Free throw percentage
RPG	Rebounds per game	APG	Assists per game	SPG	Steals per game
BPG	Blocks per game	PPG	Points per game	**Bold**	Career high

=== NBA ===
==== Regular season ====
Year	Team	GP	GS	MPG	FG%	3P%	FT%	RPG	APG	SPG	BPG	PPG
2021–22	New York	46	6	17.1	.404	.381	.684	2.0	1.0	.7	.2	6.0
2022–23	New York	71	**66**	29.9	.468	.386	.796	3.2	2.1	.7	.4	11.3
2023–24	New York	45	18	20.2	.395	.363	.706	2.0	1.2	.7	.1	7.3
2023–24	Detroit	6	0	19.2	.214	.143	**.909**	2.0	2.3	.8	**.7**	5.3
2024–25	Dallas	47	12	22.8	.463	**.398**	.765	3.8	2.1	.7	.2	10.2
2024–25	Philadelphia	28	25	**33.7**	**.469**	.373	.752	**5.2**	**4.5**	**1.5**	.4	**21.9**
2025–26	Philadelphia	**75**	19	29.4	.450	.334	.840	3.6	3.3	.9	.4	13.4
Career		318	146	25.6	.446	.366	.793	3.2	2.3	.8	.3	11.1

==== Playoffs ====
Year	Team	GP	GS	MPG	FG%	3P%	FT%	RPG	APG	SPG	BPG	PPG
2023	New York	9	**6**	**26.9**	.304	.243	.818	**2.8**	1.4	**1.0**	**.6**	5.1
2026	Philadelphia	**11**	0	22.1	**.397**	**.400**	**.875**	2.7	**2.3**	.3	.5	**6.7**
Career		20	6	24.3	.356	.319	.852	2.8	1.9	.6	.5	6.0

=== College ===
Year	Team	GP	GS	MPG	FG%	3P%	FT%	RPG	APG	SPG	BPG	PPG
2018–19	Kansas	**36**	**36**	27.4	.384	.340	.603	2.5	2.0	.6	.2	8.4
2019–20	Houston	30	21	27.9	**.443**	.326	.660	3.7	**2.6**	.8	.2	12.1
2020–21	Houston	30	30	**32.8**	.406	**.403**	**.788**	**5.7**	2.0	**1.4**	**.3**	**17.8**
Career		96	87	29.3	.411	.366	.701	3.9	2.2	.9	.2	12.5

== Personal life ==
Grimes was born on May 8, 2000, to Tonja Stelly and Marshall Grimes. His father played college basketball for the Santa Clara Broncos from 1977 to 1979. His older maternal half-brother, Tyler Myers, is a professional ice hockey player for the Dallas Stars of the National Hockey League (NHL). The two brothers have never lived together, due to Myers's move to Canada with his father just after Grimes's birth. Grimes and Myers are the first pair of brothers to play in the NBA and NHL.

Off the court, Grimes has volunteered with the Houston-based nonprofit, Play With Purpose, which works with at-risk young people in the area.
