= DeJon Jarreau =

American basketball player (born 1998)

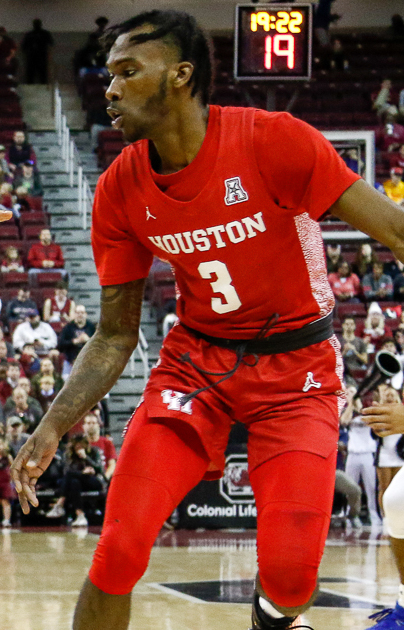
- Jarreau with Houston in 2019

No. 77 – Alvark Tokyo
- Position: Shooting guard / point guard
- League: B.League

Personal information
- Born: January 23, 1998 (age 28) New Orleans, Louisiana, U.S.
- Listed height: 6 ft 5 in (1.96 m)
- Listed weight: 185 lb (84 kg)

Career information
- High school: McDonogh 35 (New Orleans, Louisiana)
- College: UMass (2016–2017); Houston (2018–2021)
- NBA draft: 2021: undrafted
- Playing career: 2021–present

Career history
- 2021: Indiana Pacers
- 2021: →Fort Wayne Mad Ants
- 2022: Texas Legends
- 2022–2023: Capital City Go-Go
- 2024: Memphis Hustle
- 2024: Memphis Grizzlies
- 2025–2026: Memphis Hustle
- 2026: Memphis Grizzlies
- 2026–present: Alvark Tokyo

Career highlights
- Second-team All-AAC (2021); AAC Defensive Player of the Year (2021); AAC Sixth Man of the Year (2019)
- Stats at NBA.com
- Stats at Basketball Reference

DeJon Jarmond Jarreau (born January 23, 1998) is an American professional basketball player for Alvark Tokyo of the Japanese B.League. He played college basketball for the UMass Minutemen and the Houston Cougars.

== Early life and high school career ==
Jarreau grew up in the 7th Ward of New Orleans, a neighborhood suffering from crime and poverty. He attended McDonogh 35 College Preparatory Charter High School in New Orleans. He competed for Elfrid Payton Elite on the Amateur Athletic Union circuit. Jarreau was a four-star recruit and committed to playing college basketball for UMass over an offer from Miami (Florida).

== College career ==
On November 14, 2016, Jarreau recorded a freshman season-high 25 points, eight rebounds and six assists in a 90–88 loss to Ole Miss. He averaged 9.8 points and 4.5 assists per game. Jarreau left UMass after head coach Derek Kellogg was fired.

For his sophomore season, Jarreau transferred to Houston. As a sophomore, he averaged 8.7 points, 3.8 rebounds and 3.3 assists per game and was named American Athletic Conference (AAC) Sixth Man of the Year. On February 1, 2020, he was ejected from a game against Cincinnati for biting the leg of an opposing player and received a one-game suspension. In his junior season, Jarreau averaged nine points, 4.3 rebounds and 3.7 assists per game. He declared for the 2020 NBA draft before withdrawing his name and returning to college. On March 12, 2021, Jarreau recorded 15 points, 10 rebounds and 10 assists in a 77–52 win over Tulane at the AAC tournament quarterfinals. It was the first triple-double by a Houston player since Bo Outlaw in 1993 and the first in AAC Tournament history. As a senior, Jarreau averaged 10.6 points, 5.4 rebounds, 4.3 assists and 1.3 steals per game. He was named AAC Defensive Player of the Year as well as Second Team All-AAC.

== Professional career ==
=== Indiana Pacers / Fort Wayne Mad Ants (2021) ===
After going undrafted in the 2021 NBA draft, he joined the Miami Heat for the 2021 NBA Summer League. Following a strong Summer League performance, he was signed to a two-way contract by the Indiana Pacers on August 24, 2021. Under the terms of the deal, he split time between the Pacers and their NBA G League affiliate, the Fort Wayne Mad Ants. On December 15, he was waived after playing just one minute of one game for the Pacers.

=== Texas Legends (2022) ===
On December 27, 2021, Jarreau's rights were traded by the Fort Wayne Mad Ants to the Texas Legends in exchange for Kenny Williams and a 2022 first-round draft pick. On December 28, 2021, Jarreau signed a 10-day contract with the Houston Rockets, via the hardship exemption. On December 30, however, he entered the NBA's health and safety protocols and never played a game for the Rockets. After his contract with the Rockets expired, Jarreau rejoined the Legends.

=== Capital City Go-Go (2022–2023) ===
On January 23, 2022, Jarreau and a 2022 second-round draft pick were traded to the Capital City Go-Go in exchange for two 2022 first-round draft picks. On March 7, he was waived. On February 24, 2023, Jarreau was reacquired by the Capital City Go-Go.

=== Memphis Hustle (2023–2024) ===
On December 26, 2023, Jarreau was traded to the Memphis Hustle in exchange for Mychal Mulder and on March 10, 2024, he signed a 10-day contract with the Memphis Grizzlies. Ten days later, he signed a second 10-day deal with the Grizzlies. On March 30, he returned to the Hustle.

=== Memphis Grizzlies (2026) ===
On March 13, 2026, Jarreau was signed to another 10-day contract with the Grizzlies. That night, Jarreau played 24 minutes and acquired six points, seven rebounds, and three assists against the Detroit Pistons. The following night, Jarreau put up 5-5-6 in 23 minutes against the Chicago Bulls.

== Career statistics ==
Legend
GP	Games played	GS	Games started	MPG	Minutes per game
FG%	Field goal percentage	3P%	3-point field goal percentage	FT%	Free throw percentage
RPG	Rebounds per game	APG	Assists per game	SPG	Steals per game
BPG	Blocks per game	PPG	Points per game	**Bold**	Career high

=== NBA ===
Year	Team	GP	GS	MPG	FG%	3P%	FT%	RPG	APG	SPG	BPG	PPG
2021–22	Indiana	1	0	1.0	—	—	—	.0	.0	.0	.0	.0
2023–24	Memphis	9	0	16.7	.340	**.308**	.455	**4.9**	2.9	.7	.2	4.8
2025–26	Memphis	**11**	0	**21.0**	**.398**	.133	**.783**	4.6	**3.3**	**.9**	**.7**	**8.0**
Career		21	0	18.2	.376	.186	.676	4.5	3.0	.8	.5	6.2

=== College ===
Year	Team	GP	GS	MPG	FG%	3P%	FT%	RPG	APG	SPG	BPG	PPG
2016–17	UMass	**31**	24	24.4	.442	.244	.644	3.6	**4.5**	1.0	**.7**	9.8
2018–19	Houston	30	0	18.0	**.471**	**.364**	.694	3.8	3.3	.6	.5	8.7
2019–20	Houston	30	17	23.1	.374	.175	**.795**	4.3	3.7	.6	.4	9.0
2020–21	Houston	**31**	**31**	**28.3**	.432	.344	.703	**5.4**	4.3	**1.3**	.5	**10.6**
Career		122	72	23.5	.429	.285	.713	4.3	4.0	.9	.5	9.5

== Personal life ==
Dejon has a brother named John Jarreau. He is also the cousin of rapper Young Greatness, who was shot and killed in 2018. Jarreau was a basketball teammate of his close friend Brison Gresham in high school and college. He was the first member of his family to graduate from college.
