= Isaac Brown (basketball) =

American basketball player and coach

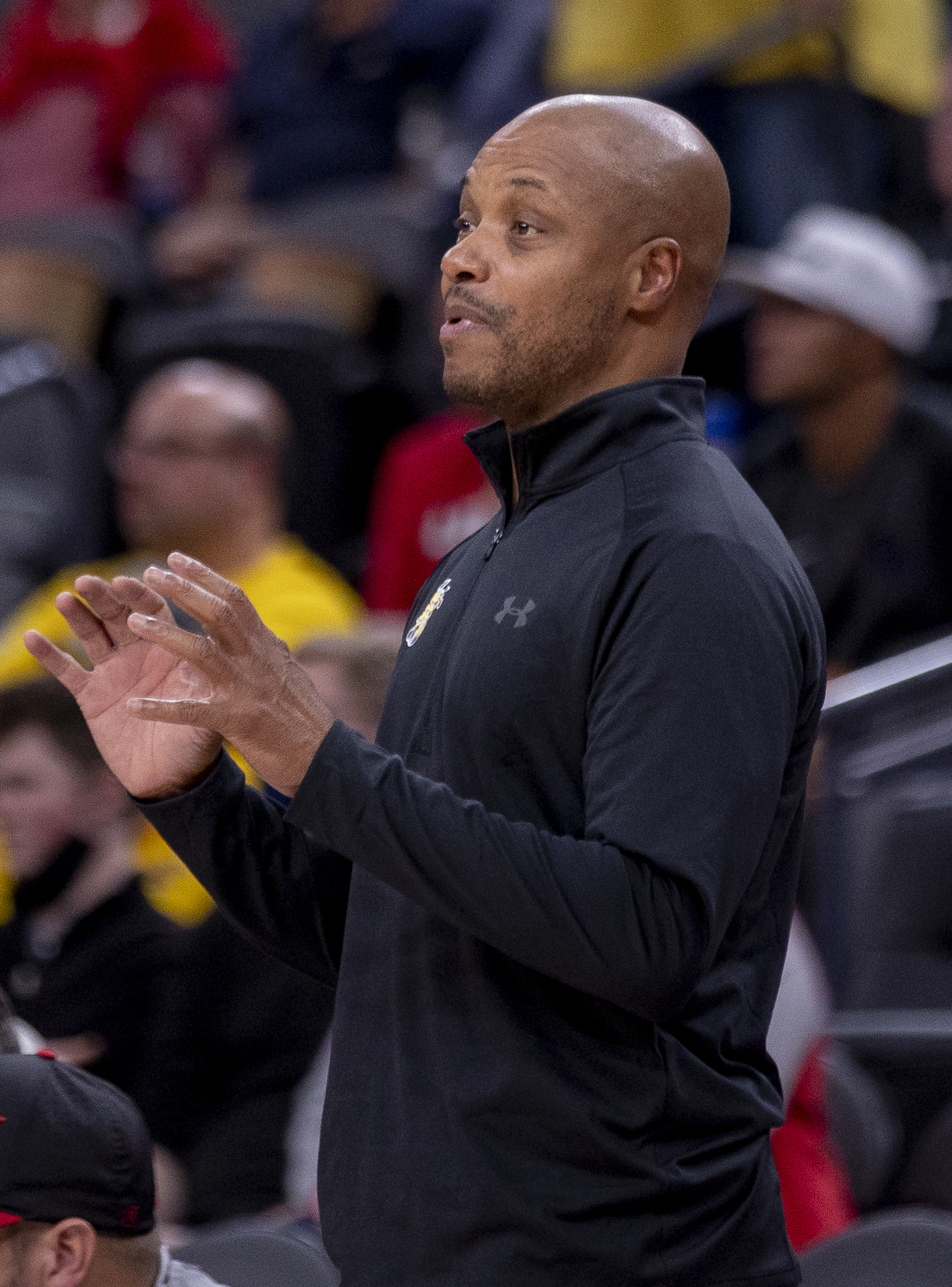
- Brown with Wichita State in 2021

Biographical details
- Born: May 7, 1969 (age 57); Pascagoula, Mississippi, U.S.

Playing career
- 1988–1990: Mississippi Gulf Coast CC
- 1990–1991: Texas A&M
- 1992–1993: Northeast Louisiana

Coaching career (HC unless noted)
- 1997–1999: Pearl River CC (assistant)
- 1999–2000: Pascagoula HS (assistant)
- 2000–2002: Okaloosa-Walton CC (assistant)
- 2002–2007: South Alabama (assistant)
- 2007–2010: Arkansas (assistant)
- 2010–2011: Arkansas State (assistant)
- 2011–2014: Louisiana Tech (assistant)
- 2014–2020: Wichita State (assistant)
- 2020–2023: Wichita State

Head coaching record
- Overall: 48–34 (.585)
- Tournaments: 0–1 (NCAA Division I)

Accomplishments and honors

Championships
- AAC regular season (2021)

Awards
- AAC Coach of the Year (2021)

Isaac Leon Brown (born May 7, 1969) is an American college basketball coach who was most recently the head coach at Wichita State.

== Playing career ==
Brown is a native of Pascagoula, Mississippi. He played basketball at Pascagoula High School and helped the team reach the state championship game in 1988. Brown played at Mississippi Gulf Coast Community College from 1988 to 1990. He played one season at Texas A&M, averaging 12 points and 2.3 rebounds per game while starting 17 games, but was dismissed in February 1991 by coach Kermit Davis. Brown decided to transfer to Northeast Louisiana. After sitting out a season, he helped Northeast Louisiana capture the 1993 Southland Conference title with a 17–1 record, finish 27–4 overall and receive a berth in the NCAA Tournament.

== Coaching career ==
Brown began his coaching career as an assistant at Pearl River Community College from 1997 to 1999. He served as an assistant at Pascagoula High School during the 1999–2000 season. Brown became an assistant at Okaloosa-Walton Community College in 2000 and served until 2002.

Brown landed his first job as a Division I assistant coach at South Alabama in 2002. Between 2007 and 2010, he was an assistant coach at Arkansas under John Pelphrey. Brown was on the staff of John Brady at Arkansas State during the 2010–11 season. Brown served as an assistant at Louisiana Tech under Mike White from 2011 to 2014. Brown helped the team receive its first-ever WAC regular season championship during the 2012–13 season. The following year, he helped guide the Bulldogs to a 29–8 record, tied for the most wins in a season in program history. He was hired as an assistant at Wichita State under Gregg Marshall in August 2014.

Brown served as the Shockers' top recruiter, and helped the team achieve a 157–50 record in six seasons including four NCAA Tournament appearances. He received the second-most votes for best assistant coach in the American Athletic Conference in a poll of league coaches in 2020. On November 17, 2020, Brown was named interim head coach at Wichita State, following the resignation of Gregg Marshall. On February 26, 2021 he was named permanent head coach, agreeing to a five-year deal. He became the first black basketball head coach in Wichita State history.

He was fired on March 11, 2023, after 3 seasons.

== Head coaching record ==
Record table
Season	Team	Overall	Conference	Standing	Postseason
Wichita State Shockers (American Athletic Conference) (2020–2023)
2020–21	Wichita State	16–6	11–2	1st	NCAA Division I First Four
2021–22	Wichita State	15–13	6–9	7th	
2022–23	Wichita State	17–15	9–9	6th	
Wichita State:		48–34 (.585)	26–20 (.565)		
Total:		48–34 (.585)			
