= ATM looting =

Method of bank robbery

An ATM looting is a type of bank robbery in which a series of cash machines are robbed of cash. The thieves do the looting by using identity fraud to create debit cards containing other people's banking information, then they withdraw money from other peoples' bank accounts.

== Lootings ==
In November 2008, an international team of thieves stole US$9 million from ATMs around the world using fake cards which took money from Worldpay.

In August 2011, an international team of thieves stole US$13 million from ATMs around the world using fake cards which took money from FIS, which is a company that issues pre-paid debit cards.

In May 2016, thieves in Japan stole 1.4 billion yen from ATMs at 1,400 convenience stores.

=== 2013 $45-million ATM cyber looting ===
In December 2012 and February 2013, a cyber-ring of criminals, operating in more than 24 countries, stole US$45 million from thousands of Automated Teller Machines (ATMs). Roughly US$5 million was stolen around the world on December 21, 2012. Success led to expansion of the crime, when an additional US$40 million was stolen on February 19, 2013.
