= Tyson Etienne =

American basketball player (born 1999)

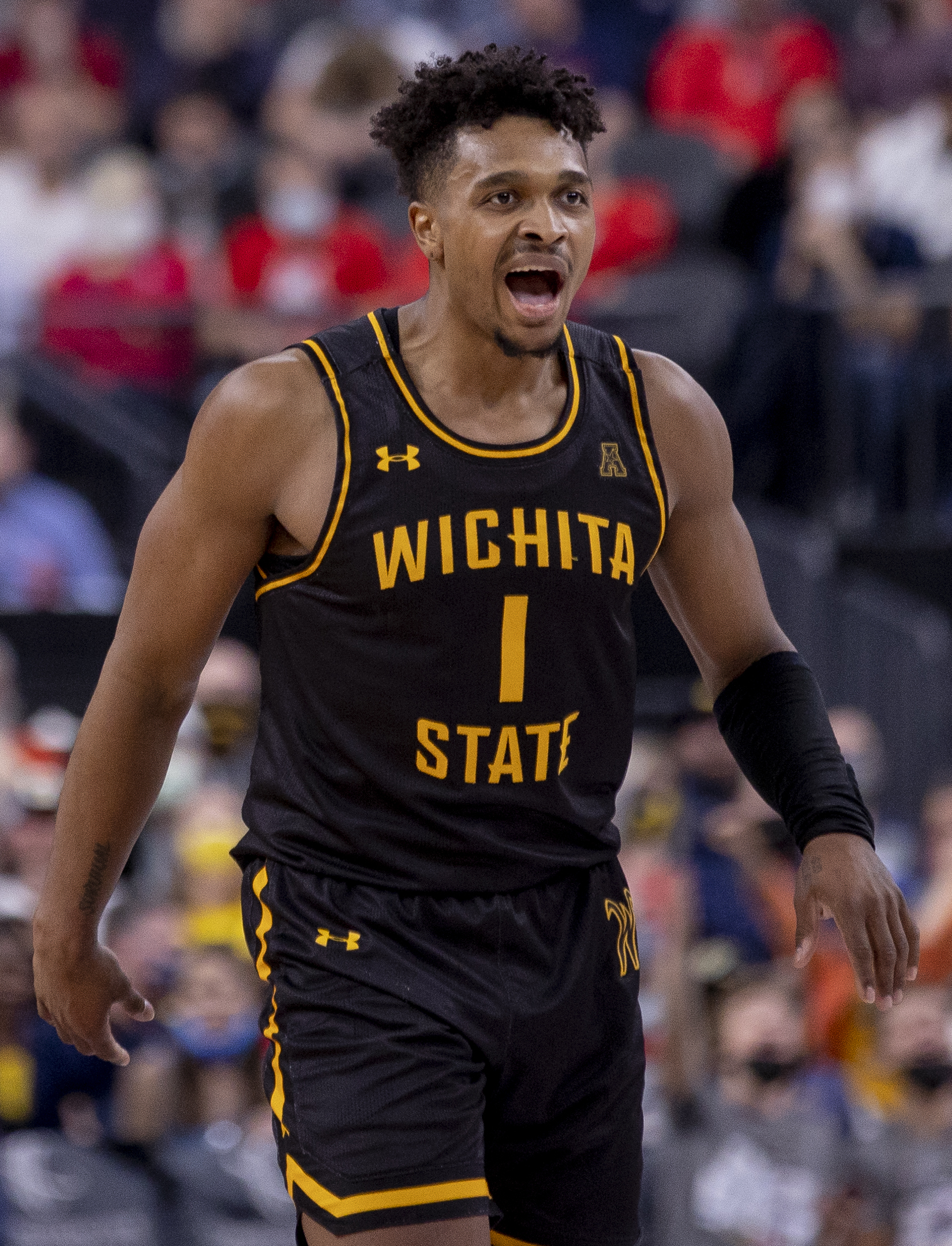
- Etienne with Wichita State in 2021

No. 9 – Paris Basketball
- Position: Point guard / shooting guard
- League: LNB Élite; EuroLeague

Personal information
- Born: September 17, 1999 (age 27) Englewood, New Jersey, U.S.
- Listed height: 6 ft 0 in (1.83 m)
- Listed weight: 200 lb (91 kg)

Career information
- High school: Dwight-Englewood School (Englewood, New Jersey); Long Island Lutheran (Brookville, New York); Putnam Science Academy (Putnam, Connecticut)
- College: Wichita State (2019–2022)
- NBA draft: 2022: undrafted
- Playing career: 2022–present

Career history
- 2022–2024: College Park Skyhawks
- 2024–2025: Long Island Nets
- 2025–2026: Brooklyn Nets
- 2025–2026: →Long Island Nets
- 2026–present: Paris Basketball

Career highlights
- French Supercup (2026); AAC co-Player of the Year (2021); First-team All-AAC (2021); Third-team All-AAC (2022)
- Stats at NBA.com
- Stats at Basketball Reference

Tyson Etienne (born September 17, 1999) is an American professional basketball player for Paris Basketball of the LNB Élite and the EuroLeague. He played college basketball for the Wichita State Shockers.

== High school career ==
Etienne began playing high school basketball as a freshman at Dwight-Englewood School in Englewood, New Jersey. For his junior season, he transferred to Long Island Lutheran Middle and High School in Brookville, New York. As a junior, Etienne averaged 16.5 points and 3.4 assists per game. He competed alongside Cole Anthony with the PSA Cardinals Amateur Athletic Union program. He played for Putnam Science Academy in Putnam, Connecticut for a postgraduate year, helping his team reach the National Prep Championship semifinals. After high school, Etienne worked with NBA trainer Chris Brickley and trained with several NBA players. A four-star recruit, he committed to playing college basketball for Wichita State over offers from Oklahoma, VCU, Seton Hall, Auburn, Minnesota and St. John's.

== College career ==
On November 16, 2019, Etienne scored a freshman season-high 21 points, shooting 5-of-8 from three-point range, in a 103–62 win over UT Martin. As a freshman, he averaged 9.4 points and shot 38.8 percent from the three-point line. In the offseason, Etienne improved his athleticism and strength. On January 2, 2021, he scored 29 points in an 83–79 win over Ole Miss. As a sophomore, Etienne averaged 16.3 points, 3.4 rebounds, 2.5 assists, and 1.0 steals per game, earning AAC co-Player of the Year honors. Following the season, he declared for the 2021 NBA draft, but ultimately returned to Wichita State. In his junior season, Etienne averaged 14.9 points, 2.9 rebounds, 2.0 assists, and 1.1 steals per game, earning a selection to the Third Team All-AAC. On April 21, 2022, he declared for the 2022 NBA draft while foregoing his remaining college eligibility.

== Professional career ==
=== College Park Skyhawks (2022–2024) ===
After going undrafted in the 2022 NBA draft, Etienne signed with the College Park Skyhawks on October 22, 2022.

=== Brooklyn Nets / Long Island Nets (2024–2026) ===
On September 10, 2024, Etienne signed with the Brooklyn Nets, but was waived the next day. On October 27, he joined the Long Island Nets. After consistently strong performances all season for their G-League affiliate, the Brooklyn Nets and Etienne agreed on a two-way contract on March 4, 2025. He made his NBA debut on March 28, recording eight points and one assist in a 132–100 loss to the Los Angeles Clippers. In seven appearances for Brooklyn, Etienne averaged 7.9 points, 1.3 rebounds, and 1.7 assists.

On July 3, 2025, Etienne re-signed with the Nets on a two-way contract. Etienne made 24 appearances (including two starts) for Brooklyn during the 2025–26 NBA season, averaging 7.9 points, 1.1 rebounds, and 1.7 assists.

=== Paris Basketball (2026–present) ===
On July 16, 2026, Etienne signed with Paris Basketball of the French LNB Élite and the EuroLeague. On September 20, 2026, Etienne wins the LNB Supercoupe, scoring 21 points in the final against Chorale Roanne Basket at Stade Roland Garros where the event took place.

== Career statistics ==
Legend
GP	Games played	GS	Games started	MPG	Minutes per game
FG%	Field goal percentage	3P%	3-point field goal percentage	FT%	Free throw percentage
RPG	Rebounds per game	APG	Assists per game	SPG	Steals per game
BPG	Blocks per game	PPG	Points per game	**Bold**	Career high

=== NBA ===
Year	Team	GP	GS	MPG	FG%	3P%	FT%	RPG	APG	SPG	BPG	PPG
2024–25	Brooklyn	7	0	**21.6**	.327	.295	.800	**1.3**	**1.7**	.4	**.1**	**7.9**
2025–26	Brooklyn	**24**	**2**	15.8	**.400**	**.398**	**.833**	1.1	**1.7**	**.5**	.0	**7.9**
Career		31	2	17.1	.381	.368	.826	1.2	1.7	.5	.0	7.9

=== College ===
Year	Team	GP	GS	MPG	FG%	3P%	FT%	RPG	APG	SPG	BPG	PPG
2019–20	Wichita State	**31**	17	24.6	**.376**	.388	**.800**	2.1	1.4	**1.2**	**.1**	9.4
2020–21	Wichita State	22	22	33.8	.371	**.392**	.757	**3.4**	**2.5**	1.0	**.1**	**16.3**
2021–22	Wichita State	27	**26**	**34.3**	.359	.326	.768	2.9	2.0	1.1	.0	14.9
Career		80	65	30.4	.367	.364	.772	2.7	1.9	1.1	.1	13.2

== Personal life ==
His father, Max Etienne, played college basketball for Maryland. His mother, Anita Gibson, is an Emmy-nominated make-up artist. Etienne is a nephew of former NBA player Marcus Camby and actor Omari Hardwick. He is a cousin of NBA player DeAndre Jordan who currently plays for the New Orleans Pelicans. Etienne's childhood friend Armoni Sexton was shot and killed in 2015, and Etienne plays basketball to honor him.
