= American Conference Men's Basketball Player of the Year =

Basketball award

- Awarded for: the most outstanding basketball player in the American Conference
- Country: United States

History
- First award: 2014
- Most recent: Izaiyah Nelson, South Florida

The American Conference Men's Basketball Player of the Year is an award given to the American Conference's most outstanding player. The conference formed in 2013–14 after many schools departed from the original Big East Conference to form their own conference. The conference was called the American Athletic Conference from its inception up until July 21, 2025, at which time it was formally rebranded. Shabazz Napier of UConn was the first-ever winner.

== Key ==
†	Co-Players of the Year
*	Awarded a national player of the year award that same season: Oscar Robertson Trophy (1958–59 to present); Naismith College Player of the Year (1968–69 to present); John R. Wooden Award (1976–77 to present)
Player (X)	Denotes the number of times the player had been awarded the American Player of the Year award at that point

== Winners ==
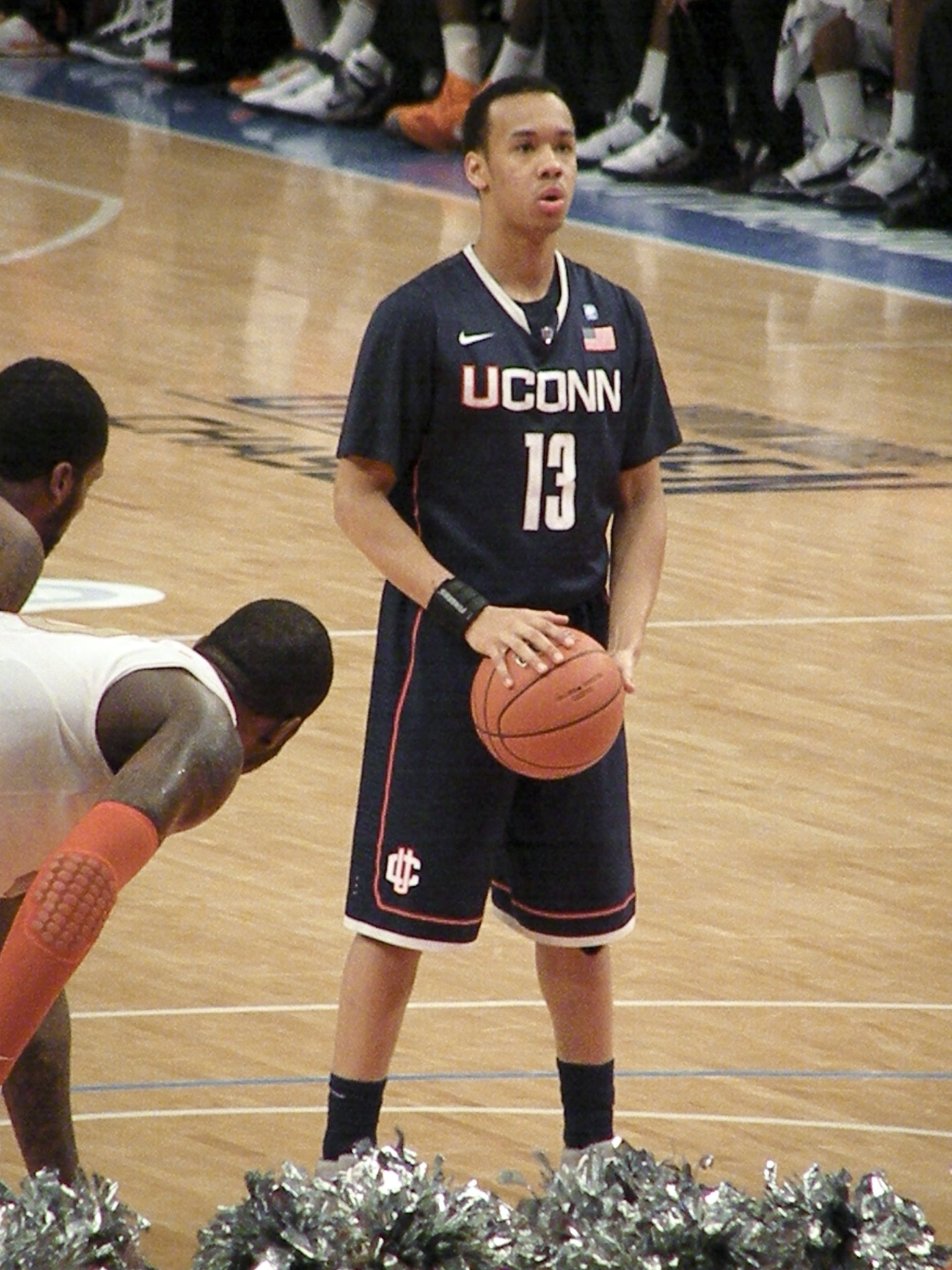
Shabazz Napier, UConn, 2014

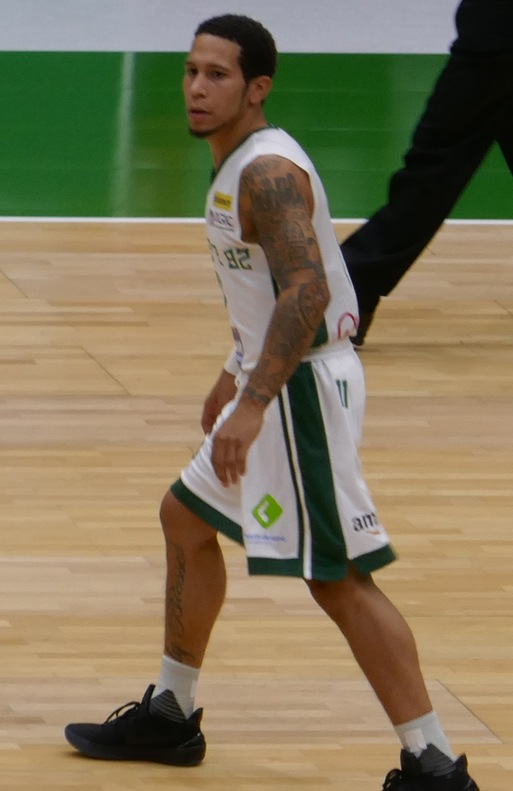
Nic Moore, SMU, 2015 and 2016

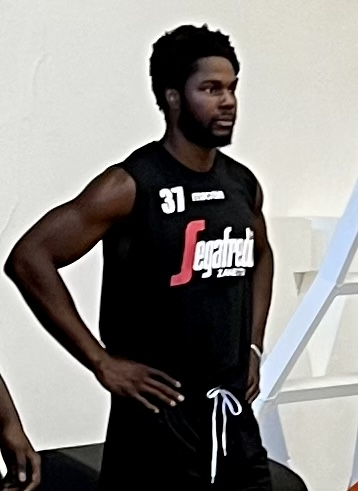
Semi Ojeleye, SMU, 2017

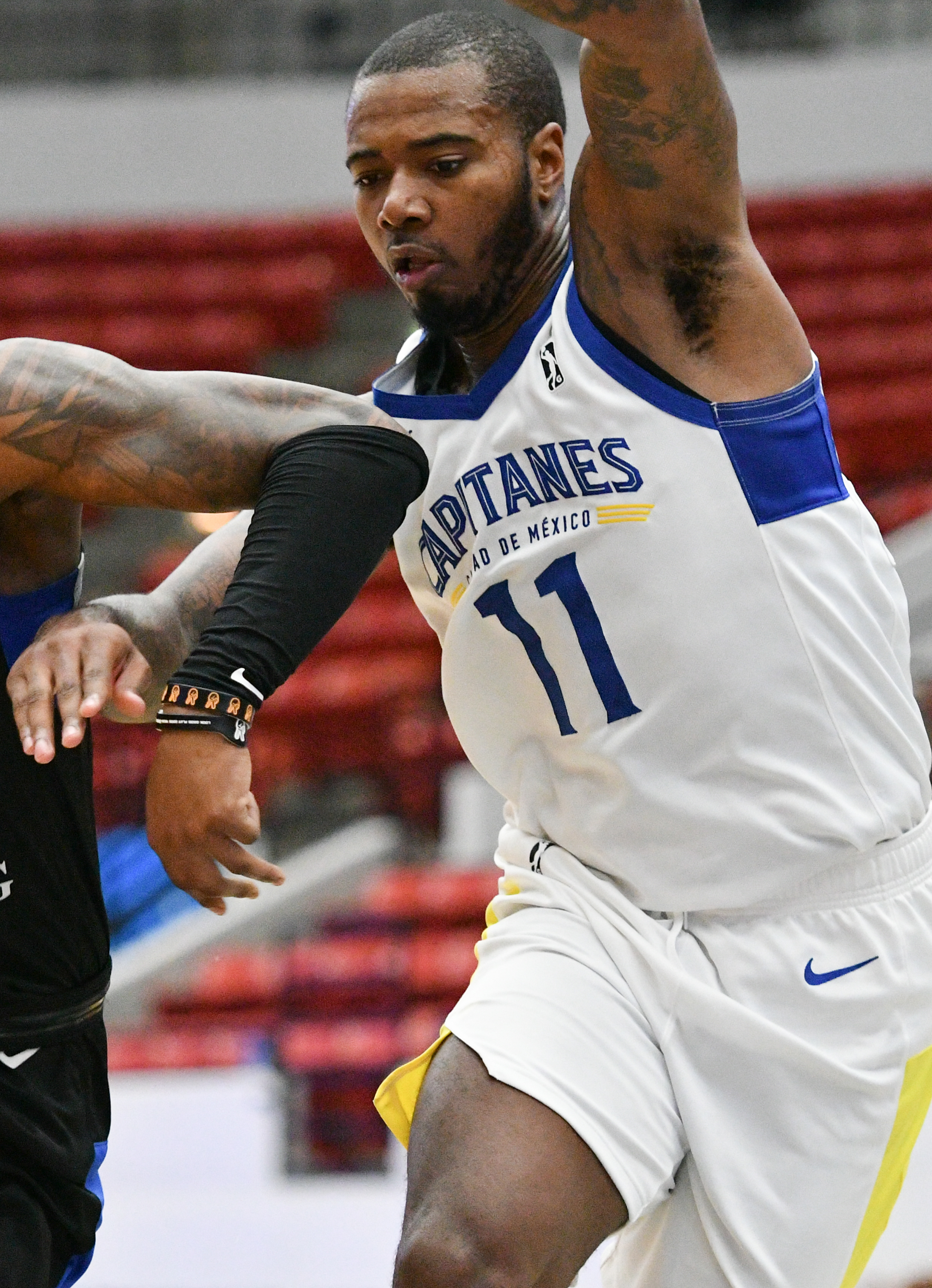
Gary Clark, Cincinnati, 2018

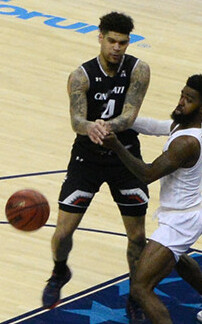
Jarron Cumberland, Cincinnati, 2019

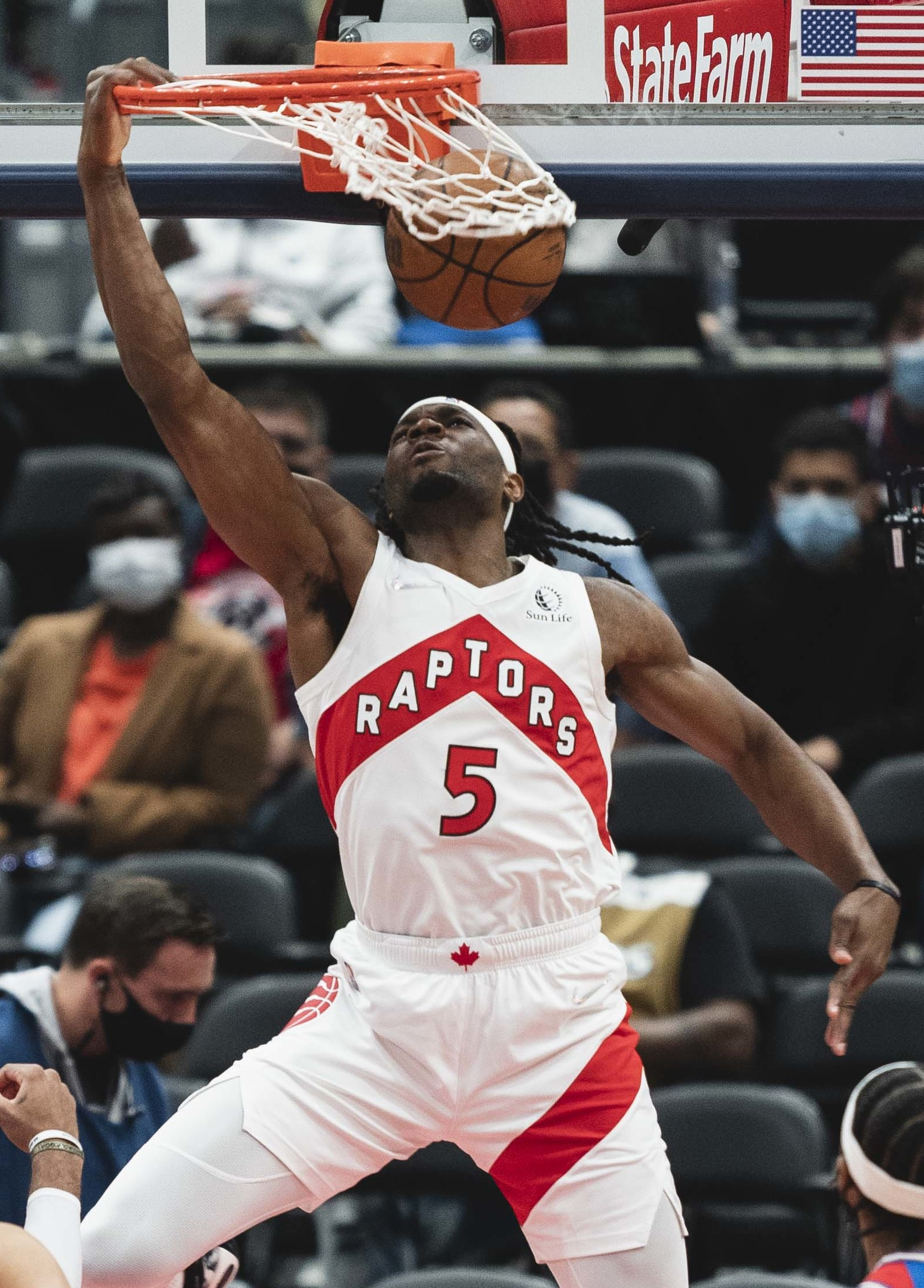
Precious Achiuwa, Memphis, 2020

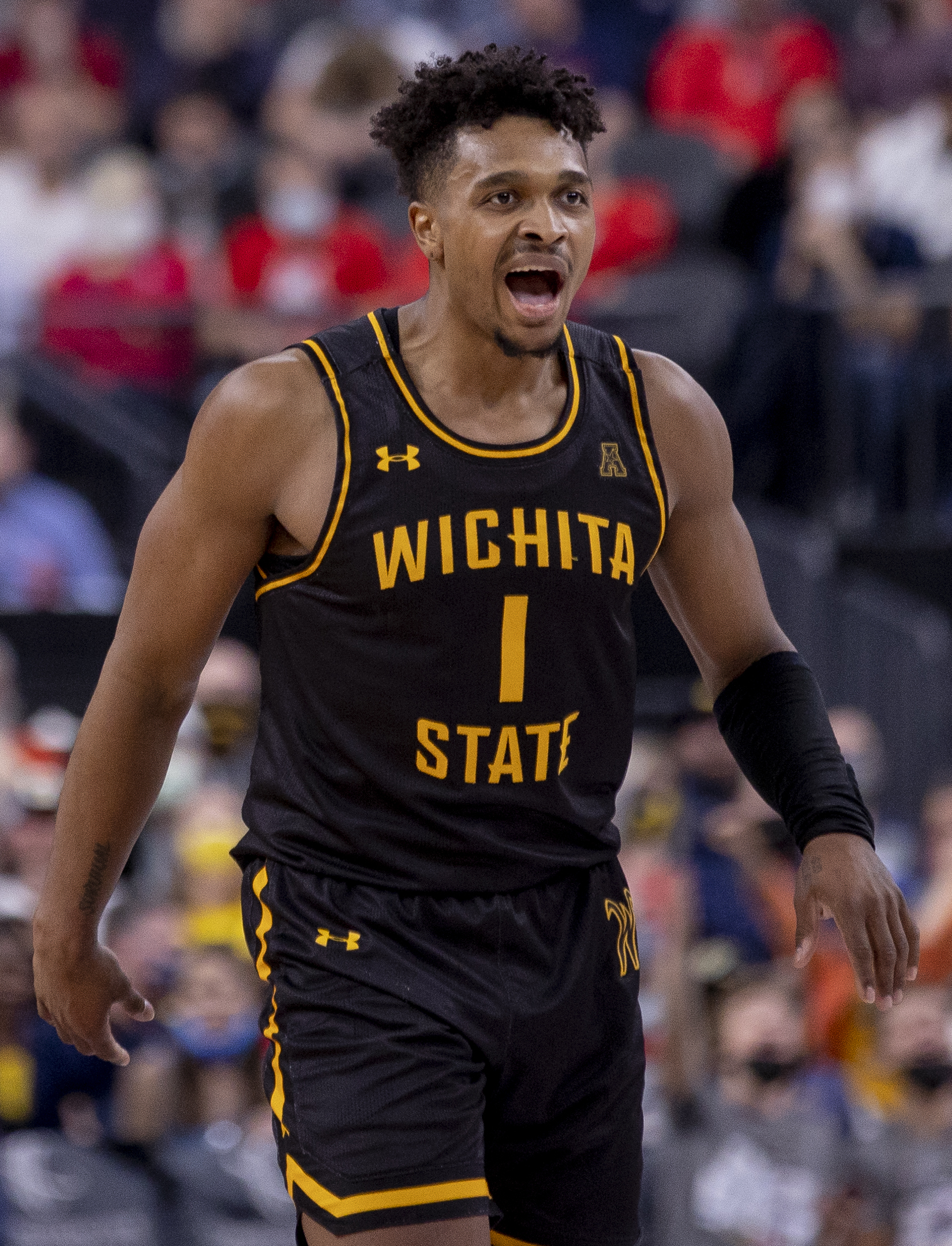
Tyson Etienne, Wichita State, 2021

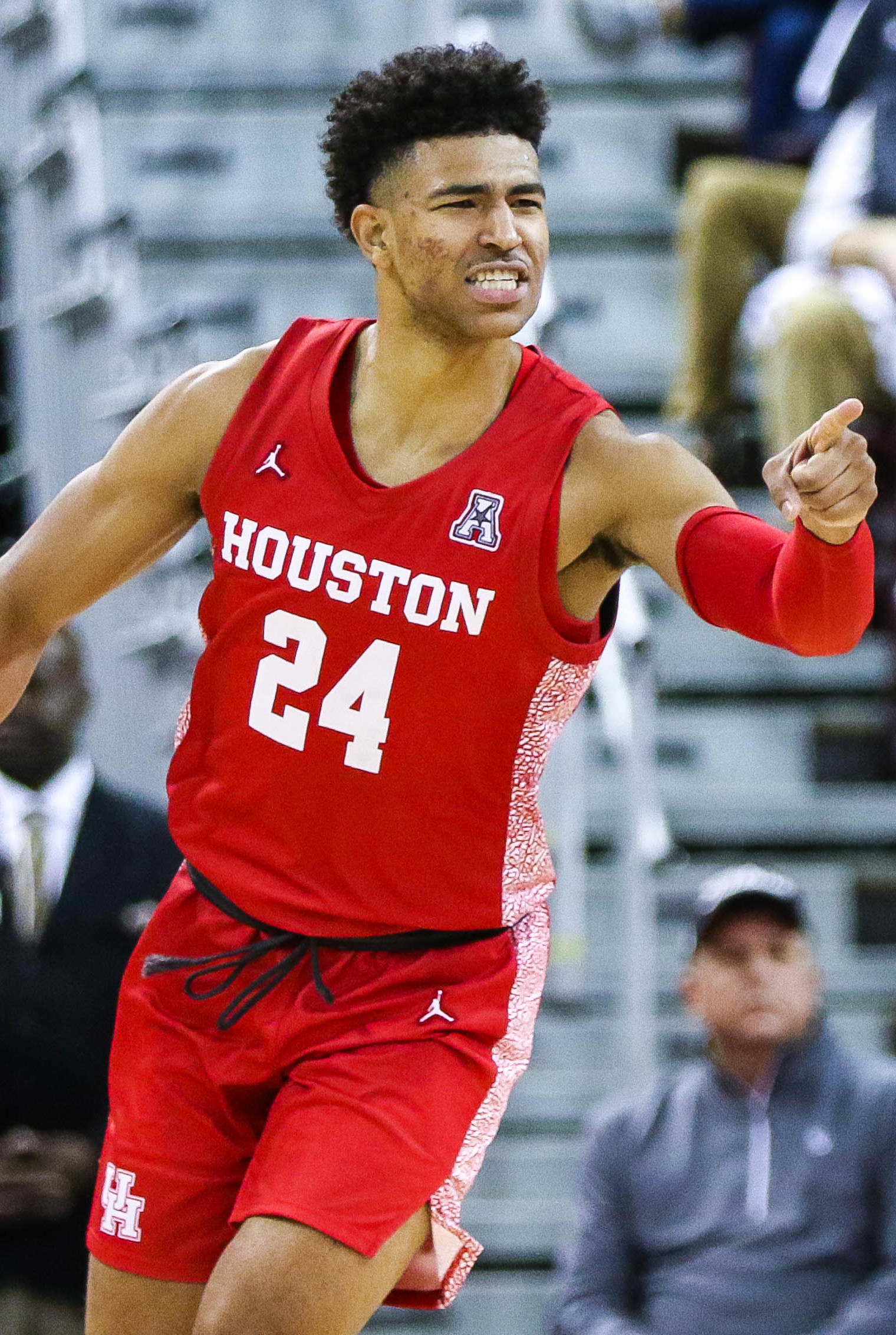
Quentin Grimes, Houston, 2021

Season	Player	School	Position	Class	Reference
2013–14	Shabazz Napier	UConn	PG	Senior	
2014–15	Nic Moore	SMU	PG	Junior	
2015–16	Nic Moore (2)	SMU	PG	Senior	
2016–17	Semi Ojeleye	SMU	PF	Junior	
2017–18	Gary Clark	Cincinnati	PF	Senior	
2018–19	Jarron Cumberland	Cincinnati	SG	Junior	
2019–20	Precious Achiuwa	Memphis	PF	Freshman	
2020–21^{†}	Tyson Etienne	Wichita State	PG / SG	Sophomore	
2020–21^{†}	Quentin Grimes	Houston	SG	Junior	
2021–22	Kendric Davis	SMU	PG	Senior	
2022–23	Marcus Sasser	Houston	PG / SG	Senior	
2023–24^{†}	Johnell Davis	Florida Atlantic	PG / SG	Junior	
2023–24^{†}	Chris Youngblood	South Florida	SG	Senior	
2024–25	PJ Haggerty	Memphis	SG	Junior	
2025–26	Izaiyah Nelson	South Florida	PF	Senior	

== Winners by school ==
The "year joined" reflects the calendar year in which each school joined the conference. Years for each award reflect the calendar year in which each season ended.

School (year joined)	Winners	Years
SMU (2013) (Note: SMU left for the Atlantic Coast Conference after the 2023–24 season.)	4	2015, 2016, 2017, 2022
Cincinnati (2013) (Note: Cincinnati, Houston, and UCF left for the Big 12 Conference after the 2022–23 season.)	2	2018, 2019
Houston (2013)	2	2021^{†}, 2023
Memphis (2013)	2	2020, 2025
South Florida (2013)	2	2024^{†}, 2026
Florida Atlantic (2023)	1	2024^{†}
UConn (2013) (Note: UConn left for the Big East Conference after the 2019–20 season.)	1	2014
Wichita State (2017)	1	2021^{†}
Charlotte (2023)	0	—
East Carolina (2014)	0	—
Louisville (2013) (Note: Louisville and Rutgers played only the 2013–14 season in The American. In July 2014, they respectively left for the ACC and Big Ten.)	0	—
North Texas (2023)	0	—
Rice (2023)	0	—
Rutgers (2013)	0	—
Temple (2013)	0	—
Tulane (2014)	0	—
Tulsa (2014)	0	—
UAB (2023)	0	—
UCF (2013)	0	—
UTSA (2023)	0	—
