= 2020–21 Tulsa Golden Hurricane men's basketball team =

University of Tulsa NCAA team

2020–21 Tulsa Golden Hurricane men's basketball
- Conference: American Athletic Conference
- Record: 11–12 (7–9 AAC)
- Head coach: Frank Haith (7th season)
- Assistant coaches: Toby Lane; Kwanza Johnson; Shea Seals
- Home arena: Reynolds Center

2020–21 American Athletic Conference men's basketball standings
	Conf.				Overall
Team	W		L	PCT	W		L	PCT
Wichita State	11	–	2	.846	16	–	6	.727
No. 6 Houston †	14	–	3	.824	28	–	4	.875
Memphis	11	–	4	.733	20	–	8	.714
SMU	7	–	4	.636	11	–	6	.647
Cincinnati	8	–	6	.571	12	–	11	.522
UCF	8	–	10	.444	11	–	12	.478
Tulsa	7	–	9	.438	11	–	12	.478
South Florida	4	–	10	.286	9	–	13	.409
Temple	4	–	10	.286	5	–	11	.313
Tulane	4	–	12	.250	10	–	13	.435
East Carolina	2	–	10	.167	8	–	11	.421
† 2021 AAC tournament winner Rankings from AP poll

The 2020–21 Tulsa Golden Hurricane men's basketball team represented the University of Tulsa during the 2020–21 NCAA Division I men's basketball season. The Golden Hurricane, led by seventh-year head coach Frank Haith, played their home games at the Reynolds Center in Tulsa, Oklahoma as members of the American Athletic Conference. They finished the season 11-12, 7-9 in AAC Play to finish in 7th place. They lost in the first round of the AAC tournament to Tulane.

== Previous season ==
The Golden Hurricane finished the 2019–20 season 21–10, 13–5 in AAC play to finish in a three-way tie for first place. Frank Haith was named AAC Coach of the Year for the season. Due to tiebreaking rules, they received the No. 3 seed in the AAC tournament, which was canceled due to the ongoing coronavirus pandemic. Shortly thereafter, the NCAA tournament and all postseason tournaments were canceled, effectively ending Tulsa's season.

== Offseason ==
=== Departures ===
Name	Number	Pos.	Height	Weight	Year	Hometown	Reason for departure
Martins Igbanu	1	F	6'8"	235	Senior	Lagos, Nigeria	Graduated
Isaiah Hill	4	G	6'0"	165	Freshman	Bakersfield, CA	Transferred to Fresno State.
Lawson Korita	5	G	6'5"	205	Senior	Little Rock, AR	Graduated
Reggie Jones	22	G	6'6"	210	Sophomore	Marion, IN	Transferred to Ball State.
Jeriah Horne	41	F	6'7"	222	RS Junior	Overland Park, KS	Graduate transferred to Colorado.

=== Incoming transfers ===
Name	Pos.	Height	Weight	Year	Hometown	Previous school
Rey Idowu	F	6'9"	240	Junior	Melbourne, FL	Transferred from Illinois State. Idowu was granted a waiver for immediate eligibility. Will have two years of remaining eligibility.
Austin Richie	F	6'6"	225	Junior	Glenwood, IL	Junior college transferred from Triton College.

=== 2020 recruiting class ===
College recruiting information
Name	Hometown	School	Height	Weight	Commit date
Keshawn Williams; PG	Chicago, Illinois	Bloom High School	6 ft 2 in (1.88 m)	175 lb (79 kg)	Oct 22, 2019
Keshawn Williams; PG	Recruit ratings: Scout: Rivals: 247Sports: ESPN: (NR)				
Peyton Urbancic; SG	Naples, Florida	First Baptist Academy	6 ft 6 in (1.98 m)	185 lb (84 kg)	Feb 27, 2020
Peyton Urbancic; SG	Recruit ratings: Scout: Rivals: 247Sports: ESPN: (NR)				
Christian Shumate; SF	Chicago Heights, Illinois	Bloom High School	6 ft 6 in (1.98 m)	185 lb (84 kg)	Apr 17, 2020
Christian Shumate; SF	Recruit ratings: Scout: Rivals: 247Sports: ESPN: (NR)				
Bradley Alcime; F	Fort Lauderdale, Florida	Archbishop McCarthy	6 ft 8 in (2.03 m)	200 lb (91 kg)	Jul 9, 2020
Bradley Alcime; F	Recruit ratings: Scout: Rivals: 247Sports: ESPN: (NR)				
Overall recruit ranking:
Note: In many cases, Scout, Rivals, 247Sports, On3, and ESPN may conflict in their listings of height and weight.; In these cases, the average was taken. ESPN grades are on a 100-point scale.; Sources: "Tulsa 2020 Basketball Commitments". Rivals.; "2020 Team Ranking". Rivals.; "2020 Tulsa Golden Hurricane Basketball 24/7 Sports Commits". 247Sports.

Tulsa will also add Preferred Walk-on Ari Seals a 6'3" guard from Frisco High School in Frisco, Texas. Seals is the son of current Tulsa assistant Shea Seals.

=== 2021 recruiting class ===
College recruiting information (2021)
Name	Hometown	School	Height	Weight	Commit date
Gavyn Elkamil; CG	Branson, Missouri	Link Year Prep	6 ft 3 in (1.91 m)	185 lb (84 kg)	Aug 10, 2020
Gavyn Elkamil; CG	Recruit ratings: (NR)				
Overall recruit ranking:
Note: In many cases, Scout, Rivals, 247Sports, On3, and ESPN may conflict in their listings of height and weight.; In these cases, the average was taken. ESPN grades are on a 100-point scale.; Sources: "Tulsa 2021 Basketball Commitments". Rivals.; "2021 Team Ranking". Rivals.; "2021 Tulsa Golden Hurricane Basketball 24/7 Sports Commits". 247Sports.

== Preseason ==
=== AAC preseason media poll ===
On October 28, The American released the preseason Poll and other preseason awards

Coaches Poll
Predicted finish	Team	Votes (1st place)
1	Houston	99 (2)
2	Memphis	90 (2)
3	SMU	80
4	Cincinnati	77
5	South Florida	61
6	Tulsa	50
7	Wichita State	44
8	UCF	37
9	East Carolina	34
10	Temple	18
11	Tulane	15

=== Preseason Awards ===
- All-AAC First Team – Brandon Rachal

== Roster ==
2020–21 Tulsa Golden Hurricane men's basketball team
Players
Coaches

Pos.	#	Name	Height	Weight	Year	Previous school	Hometown
G	0	Curtis Haywood II	6 ft 5 in (1.96 m)	198 lb (90 kg)	RS Jr	Brewster Academy; Georgia Tech	Oklahoma City, OK
G	1	Brandon Rachal	6 ft 6 in (1.98 m)	218 lb (99 kg)	Sr	Natchitoches Central HS; LSU; Pearl River CC	Natchitoches, LA
G	2	Keyshawn Embery-Simpson	6 ft 3 in (1.91 m)	193 lb (88 kg)	RS So	Midwest City HS; Arkansas	Midwest City, OK
G	3	Elijah Joiner	6 ft 3 in (1.91 m)	201 lb (91 kg)	Sr	Curie Metropolitan HS	Chicago, IL
G	4	Keshawn Williams	6 ft 3 in (1.91 m)	177 lb (80 kg)	Fr	Bloom HS	Chicago, IL
G	5	Peyton Urbancic	6 ft 6 in (1.98 m)	199 lb (90 kg)	Fr	First Baptist Academy	Naples, FL
G	10	Ryan Gendron (W)	6 ft 4 in (1.93 m)	204 lb (93 kg)	RS Fr	Bishop Kelley HS; Oklahoma State	Tulsa, OK
G	11	Darien Jackson	6 ft 3 in (1.91 m)	203 lb (92 kg)	Sr	Blue Valley Northwest HS	Overland Park, KS
C	12	Emmanuel Ugboh	7 ft 0 in (2.13 m)	247 lb (112 kg)	Sr	Quality Education Academy; Iowa Western CC	Lagos, Nigeria
F	13	Bradley Alcime	6 ft 8 in (2.03 m)	216 lb (98 kg)	Fr	Archbishop McCarthy	Fort Lauderdale, FL
F	15	Josh Earley	6 ft 7 in (2.01 m)	242 lb (110 kg)	So	Bishop Miege HS	Shawnee Mission, KS
G	22	Christian Shumate	6 ft 6 in (1.98 m)	202 lb (92 kg)	Fr	Bloom HS	Chicago Heights, IL
G	23	Ari Seals (W)	6 ft 3 in (1.91 m)	171 lb (78 kg)	Fr	Frisco HS	Frisco, TX
F	25	Rey Idowu	6 ft 9 in (2.06 m)	243 lb (110 kg)	Jr	Clearwater Academy; Illinois State	Melbourne, FL
G/F	32	Austin Richie	6 ft 6 in (1.98 m)	226 lb (103 kg)	Jr	Bloom HS; Northern Illinois; Triton College	Glenwood, IL

Head coach

- Frank Haith (Elon)

Assistant coach(es)

- Kwanza Johnson (Tulsa)
- Shea Seals (Tulsa)

Legend

- (C) Team captain
- (S) Suspended
- (I) Ineligible
- (W) Walk-on
- Injured
- Current redshirt

Roster
Last update: July 19, 2020

== Schedule and results ==
=== COVID-19 impact ===
Due to the ongoing COVID-19 pandemic, the Golden Hurricane's schedule is subject to change, including the cancellation or postponement of individual games, the cancellation of the entire season, or games played either with minimal fans or without fans in attendance and just essential personnel.

- Tulsa added a game vs. Southwestern Christian on December 23.
- The game vs. UCF rescheduled for March 2 was moved to Orlando.
- The game @ UCF originally scheduled for February 6 was moved to Tulsa.
- The game @ Tulane scheduled for February 10 was moved to Tulsa.
- Tulsa added a game vs. Northeastern State on March 3.

Tulsa announced that home games for the first month of the season would be played in front of no fans.

=== Schedule ===
Date time, TV	Rank^{#}	Opponent^{#}	Result	Record	High points	High rebounds	High assists	Site (attendance) city, state
Regular season
November 28, 2020*; 6:30 pm, ESPN3		vs. TCU; Hall of Fame Classic Semifinals	L 65–71	0–1	19 – Rachal	8 – Rachal	5 – Joiner	T-Mobile Center; Kansas City, MO
November 29, 2020*; 1:00 p.m., ESPN2		vs. South Carolina; Hall of Fame Classic third-place game	L 58–69	0–2	14 – Rachal	7 – Joiner	4 – Jackson	T-Mobile Center; Kansas City, MO
December 4, 2020*; 4:00 p.m., ESPN+		UT Arlington	W 79–64	1–2	19 – Rachal	9 – Jackson	5 – Haywood II	Reynolds Center; Tulsa, OK
December 8, 2020*; 6:00 p.m.		Arkansas	Postponed due to COVID-19 issues					Reynolds Center; Tulsa, OK
December 12, 2020*; 2:00 p.m.		at Oral Roberts	Postponed due to COVID-19 issues					Mabee Center; Tulsa, OK
December 15, 2020; 6:00 p.m., ESPNU		Wichita State; Rivalry	L 65–69	1–3 (0–1)	17 – Rachal	11 – Rachal	5 – Joiner	Reynolds Center; Tulsa, OK
December 18, 2020*; 1:00 p.m., ESPN+		Northwestern State	W 82–55	2–3	19 – Richie	8 – Idowu	5 – Williams	Reynolds Center; Tulsa, OK
December 21, 2020; 7:00 p.m., ESPN2		at Memphis	W 56–49	3–3 (1–1)	14 – Richie	7 – Rachal	6 – Joiner	FedExForum; Memphis, TN
December 23, 2020*; 7:00 p.m., ESPN+		Southwestern Christian	W 102–45	4–3	20 – Williams	10 – Rachal	9 – Williams	Reynolds Center; Tulsa, OK
December 29, 2020; 8:00 p.m., ESPN2		No. 5 Houston	W 65–64	5–3 (2–1)	20 – Rachal	7 – Rachal	4 – Joiner	Reynolds Center; Tulsa, OK
January 2, 2021; 2:00 p.m., ESPN+		at Cincinnati	W 70–66	6–3 (3–1)	25 – Rachal	13 – Rachal	4 – Joiner	Fifth Third Arena (300); Cincinnati, OH
January 6, 2021; 3:00 p.m., ESPN+		at South Florida	W 61–51	7–3 (4–1)	15 – Rachal	7 – Joiner	6 – Joiner	Yuengling Center; Tampa, FL
January 13, 2021; 6:00 p.m., ESPN+		at Wichita State rivalry	L 53–72	7–4 (4–2)	12 – Jackson	9 – Jackson	3 – Tied	Charles Koch Arena (2,048); Wichita, KS
January 17, 2021; 2:00 p.m., ESPN+		Memphis	W 58–57	8–4 (5–2)	14 – Joiner	5 – Joiner	2 – Tied	Reynolds Center (100); Tulsa, OK
January 20, 2021; 7:00 p.m., ESPN+		at No. 8 Houston	L 59–86	8–5 (5–3)	18 – Rachal	5 – Haywood II	3 – Tied	Fertitta Center (1,859); Houston, TX
January 23, 2021; 2:00 p.m., ESPN+		Tulane	Postponed due to COVID-19 issues					Reynolds Center; Tulsa, OK
January 26, 2021; 12:00 p.m., ESPN+		at Temple; Previously scheduled for Mar. 2	L 67–76	8–6 (5–4)	20 – Idowu	4 – Tied	4 – Rachal	Liacouras Center; Philadelphia, PA
January 30, 2021; 11:00 a.m., ESPN+		at East Carolina	W 77–68	9–6 (6–4)	21 – Rachal	10 – Rachal	4 – Jackson	Williams Arena (82); Greenville, NC
February 3, 2021; 8:00 p.m., ESPNU		South Florida	Postponed due to COVID-19 issues					Reynolds Center; Tulsa, OK
February 3, 2021; 8:00 p.m., ESPNU		SMU; Previously scheduled for Feb. 13	L 63–65	9–7 (6–5)	18 – Haywood II	5 – Tied	3 – Tied	Reynolds Center (100); Tulsa, OK
February 6, 2021; 11:00 a.m., ESPN2		UCF	L 58–65	9–8 (6–6)	14 – Joiner	8 – Rachal	5 – Joiner	Reynolds Center; Tulsa, OK
February 10, 2021; 4:00 p.m., ESPN+		Tulane	L 48–58	9–9 (6–7)	14 – Rachal	10 – Rachal	6 – Haywood II	Reynolds Center (100); Tulsa, OK
February 16, 2021; 6:00 p.m., ESPNU		Temple	W 72–66	10–9 (7–7)	17 – Joiner	7 – Jackson	4 – Haywood II	Reynolds Center (100); Tulsa, OK
February 24, 2021; 8:00 p.m., ESPNU		Cincinnati	L 69–70	10–10 (7–8)	22 – Joiner	12 – Rachal	4 – Joiner	Reynolds Center (100); Tulsa, OK
February 27, 2021; 6:00 p.m., ESPN+		East Carolina	Postponed due to COVID-19 issues					Reynolds Center; Tulsa, OK
March 2, 2021; 6:00 p.m., ESPNU		at UCF; Previously scheduled for Jan. 9	L 69–73	10–11 (7–9)	16 – Rachal	9 – Rachal	7 – Joiner	Addition Financial Arena (1,309); Orlando, FL
March 4, 2021*; 12:00 p.m., ESPN+		Northeastern State	W 107–74	11–11	18 – Rachal	6 – Tied	7 – Jackson	Reynolds Center (100); Tulsa, OK
March 7, 2021; 2:00 p.m., ESPN+		at SMU	Cancelled due to COVID-19 issues					Moody Coliseum; University Park, TX
American Conference tournament
March 11, 2021; 2:00 pm, ESPNU	(7)	vs. (10) Tulane; First round	L 70–77	11–12	21 – Rachal	14 – Rachal	12 – Joiner	Dickies Arena; Fort Worth, TX
*Non-conference game. ^{#}Rankings from AP Poll. (#) Tournament seedings in parentheses. All times are in Central Time.

== Awards and honors ==
=== American Athletic Conference honors ===
==== All-AAC Awards ====
- Sixth Man of the Year: Darien Jackson

==== All-AAC Second Team ====
- Brandon Rachal
