= 2021 American Athletic Conference men's basketball tournament =

- Classification: Division I
- Season: 2020–21
- Teams: 11
- Site: Dickies Arena; Fort Worth, Texas
- Champions: Houston (1st title)
- Winning coach: Kelvin Sampson (1st title)
- MVP: Quentin Grimes (Houston)
- Television: ESPN, ESPNU, ESPN2

2020–21 American Athletic Conference men's basketball standings
| | Conf. | | | | Overall |
| Team | W | | L | PCT | W | | L | PCT |
|---|---|---|---|---|---|---|---|---|
| Wichita State | 11 | – | 2 | .846 | 16 | – | 6 | .727 |
| No. 6 Houston † | 14 | – | 3 | .824 | 28 | – | 4 | .875 |
| Memphis | 11 | – | 4 | .733 | 20 | – | 8 | .714 |
| SMU | 7 | – | 4 | .636 | 11 | – | 6 | .647 |
| Cincinnati | 8 | – | 6 | .571 | 12 | – | 11 | .522 |
| UCF | 8 | – | 10 | .444 | 11 | – | 12 | .478 |
| Tulsa | 7 | – | 9 | .438 | 11 | – | 12 | .478 |
| South Florida | 4 | – | 10 | .286 | 9 | – | 13 | .409 |
| Temple | 4 | – | 10 | .286 | 5 | – | 11 | .313 |
| Tulane | 4 | – | 12 | .250 | 10 | – | 13 | .435 |
| East Carolina | 2 | – | 10 | .167 | 8 | – | 11 | .421 |
† 2021 AAC tournament winner Rankings from AP poll

The 2021 American Athletic Conference men's basketball tournament was the postseason men's basketball tournament for the American Athletic Conference. It was held at the Dickies Arena in Fort Worth, Texas from March 11–14.

== Seeds ==
The top five teams received a bye into the quarterfinals. Teams were seeded by record within the conference, with a tiebreaker system to seed teams with identical conference records. Tiebreakers: win–loss record, head-to-head record, record against the highest ranked team outside of the tied teams, record against the second highest ranked team outside of the tied teams, etc.

| Seed | School | Conference | Overall | Tiebreaker |
|---|---|---|---|---|
| 1 | Wichita State | 11–2 | 15–4 | |
| 2 | Houston | 14–3 | 21–3 | |
| 3 | Memphis | 11–4 | 15–7 | |
| 4 | SMU | 7–4 | 11–4 | |
| 5 | Cincinnati | 8–6 | 10–10 | |
| 6 | UCF | 8–10 | 10–11 | |
| 7 | Tulsa | 7–9 | 11–11 | |
| 8 | South Florida | 4–10 | 8–12 | 1–0 vs Cincinnati |
| 9 | Temple | 4–10 | 5–10 | 0–2 vs Cincinnati |
| 10 | Tulane | 4–12 | 9–12 | |
| 11 | East Carolina | 2–10 | 8–10 | |

== Schedule ==
| Game | Time | Matchup^{#} | Score | Television | Attendance |
First round – Thursday, March 11
| 1 | 11:00 AM | No. 8 South Florida vs No. 9 Temple | 73–71 | ESPNU | |
| 2 | 2:00 PM | No. 7 Tulsa vs No. 10 Tulane | 70–77 | ESPNU | |
| 3 | 7:00 PM | No. 6 UCF vs No. 11 East Carolina | 72–62 | ESPN2 | |
Quarterfinals – Friday, March 12
| 4 | 11:00 AM | No. 1 Wichita State vs No. 8 South Florida | 68–67 | ESPN2 | 778 |
| 5 | 2:00 PM | No. 4 SMU vs No. 5 Cincinnati | 71–74 | ESPN2 | 778 |
| 6 | 6:00 PM | No. 2 Houston vs No. 10 Tulane | 77–52 | ESPN2 | 826 |
| 7 | 9:00 PM | No. 3 Memphis vs No. 6 UCF | 70–62 | ESPN2 | 826 |
Semifinals – Saturday, March 13
| 8 | 2:00 PM | No. 1 Wichita State vs No. 5 Cincinnati | 59–60 | ESPN2 | 1,182 |
| 9 | 4:30 PM | No. 2 Houston vs No. 3 Memphis | 76–74 | ESPN2 | 1,182 |
Championship Game – Sunday, March 14
| 10 | 2:15 PM | No. 2 Houston vs No. 5 Cincinnati | 91–54 | ESPN | |
Game times in CT. #-denote tournament seeding.

== Bracket ==
First round Thursday, March 11
8 | South Florida | 73
9 | Temple | 71
7 | Tulsa | 70
10 | Tulane | 77
6 | UCF | 72
11 | East Carolina | 62

Quarterfinals; Friday, March 12
1 | Wichita State | 68
8 | South Florida | 67
4 | SMU | 71
5 | Cincinnati | 74
2 | #7 Houston | 77
10 | Tulane | 52
3 | Memphis | 70
6 | UCF | 62

Semifinals; Saturday, March 13
1 | Wichita State | 59
5 | Cincinnati | 60
2 | #7 Houston | 76
3 | Memphis | 74

Championship; Sunday, March 14
5 | Cincinnati | 54
2 | #7 Houston | 91

== See also ==
- 2021 American Athletic Conference women's basketball tournament
