= 2020–21 Tulane Green Wave men's basketball team =

American college basketball season

2020–21 Tulane Green Wave men's basketball
- Conference: American Athletic Conference
- Record: 10–13 (4–12 AAC)
- Head coach: Ron Hunter (2nd season)
- Assistant coaches: Ray McCallum; Claude Pardue; Kevin Johnson
- Home arena: Devlin Fieldhouse

2020–21 American Athletic Conference men's basketball standings
	Conf.				Overall
Team	W		L	PCT	W		L	PCT
Wichita State	11	–	2	.846	16	–	6	.727
No. 6 Houston †	14	–	3	.824	28	–	4	.875
Memphis	11	–	4	.733	20	–	8	.714
SMU	7	–	4	.636	11	–	6	.647
Cincinnati	8	–	6	.571	12	–	11	.522
UCF	8	–	10	.444	11	–	12	.478
Tulsa	7	–	9	.438	11	–	12	.478
South Florida	4	–	10	.286	9	–	13	.409
Temple	4	–	10	.286	5	–	11	.313
Tulane	4	–	12	.250	10	–	13	.435
East Carolina	2	–	10	.167	8	–	11	.421
† 2021 AAC tournament winner Rankings from AP poll

The 2020–21 Tulane Green Wave men's basketball team represented Tulane University during the 2020–21 NCAA Division I men's basketball season. The Green Wave, led by second-year head coach Ron Hunter, played their home games at Devlin Fieldhouse in New Orleans, Louisiana, as seventh-year members of the American Athletic Conference. They finished the season 10-13, 4-12 in AAC Play to finish in 10th place. They defeated Tulsa in the first round of the AAC tournament before losing in the quarterfinals to Houston.

== Previous season ==
The Green Wave 12–18, 4–14 in AAC play to finish in 12th place. They entered as the No. 12 seed in the AAC tournament, which was ultimately cancelled due to the coronavirus pandemic.

== Offseason ==
=== Departures ===
Name	Number	Pos.	Height	Weight	Year	Hometown	Reason for departure
Charlie Russell Jr.	0	G/F	6'7"	190	Freshman	New Orleans, LA	Transferred to UMass Lowell
K. J. Lawson	1	G/F	6'7"	215	Graduate Student	Memphis, TN	Completed college eligibility (Note: Lawson, Thomas, and Thompson were all graduate transfers in the 2019–20 season, with Lawson having graduated from Kansas, Thomas from Norfolk State, and Thompson from Rhode Island.)
Ray Ona Embo	3	G	6'5"	195	RS Junior	Lognes, France	Left team (mid-season)
TeShuan Hightower	5	G	6'5"	190	Junior	Lithonia, GA	Dismissed from team
Kevin Zhang	12	F	6'10"	220	Sophomore	Shenyang, China	Play professionally
Nic Thomas	14	G	6'1"	185	Graduate Student	Arlington, TX	Completed college eligibility
Grant Quinn	15	G	6'5"	200	RS Junior	Lewisville, TX	Walk-on; did not return
Christion Thompson	25	G	6'4"	215	Graduate Student	Gonzales, LA	Completed college eligibility
Cameron Galic	32	G	6'6"	205	Junior	Bethesda, MD	Walk-on; did not return

=== Incoming transfers ===
Name	Pos.	Height	Weight	Year	Hometown	Previous School
Oton Jankovic	F	6'10"	212	Sophomore	Zagreb, Croatia	Transferred from Vanderbilt. Jankovic was granted a waiver for immediate eligibility. Will have three years of remaining eligibility.
Gabe Watson	G	6'2"	192	Junior	Jackson, MS	Transferred from Southern Miss. Watson was granted a waiver for immediate eligibility. Will have two years of remaining eligibility.
Jaylen Forbes	G	6'4"	186	Sophomore	Florence, MS	Transferred from Alabama. Forbes was granted a waiver for immediate eligibility. Will have three years of remaining eligibility.
Kevin Cross Jr.	F	6'8"	240	Sophomore	Little Rock, AR	Transferred from Nebraska. Cross was granted a waiver for immediate eligibility. Will have three years of remaining eligibility.

=== 2020 recruiting class ===
College recruiting information
Name	Hometown	School	Height	Weight	Commit date
Jadan Coleman; SG	Madison, AL	Bob Jones High School	6 ft 4 in (1.93 m)	155 lb (70 kg)	Nov 15, 2018
Jadan Coleman; SG	Recruit ratings: Scout: Rivals: 247Sports: (NR)				
Sion James; PG	Buford, GA	Lanier High School	6 ft 4 in (1.93 m)	185 lb (84 kg)	Sep 1, 2019
Sion James; PG	Recruit ratings: Scout: Rivals: 247Sports: (NR)				
Overall recruit ranking: 247Sports: 131
Note: In many cases, Scout, Rivals, 247Sports, On3, and ESPN may conflict in their listings of height and weight.; In these cases, the average was taken. ESPN grades are on a 100-point scale.; Sources: "2020 Team Ranking". Rivals.

Tulane will also add Preferred Walk-on Ben Callahan-Gold, a 6'7" swingman from Northfield Mount Hermon School. Ben is the son of comedian Judy Gold.

== Preseason ==
=== AAC preseason media poll ===
On October 28, The American released the preseason Poll and other preseason awards

Coaches Poll
Predicted finish	Team	Votes (1st place)
1	Houston	99 (2)
2	Memphis	90 (2)
3	SMU	80
4	Cincinnati	77
5	South Florida	61
6	Tulsa	50
7	Wichita State	44
8	UCF	37
9	East Carolina	34
10	Temple	18
11	Tulane	15

== Roster ==
2020–21 Tulane Green Wave men's basketball team
Players
Coaches

Pos.	#	Name	Height	Weight	Year	Previous school	Hometown
G	0	Gabe Watson	6 ft 2 in (1.88 m)	192 lb (87 kg)	Jr	St. Joseph; Southern Miss	Jackson, MS
G	1	Sion James	6 ft 4 in (1.93 m)	185 lb (84 kg)	Fr	Lanier	Buford, GA
G	2	Jordan Walker	5 ft 11 in (1.8 m)	170 lb (77 kg)	RS Jr	The Patrick School; Seton Hall	Port Washington, NY
F	3	Tylan Pope	6 ft 6 in (1.98 m)	220 lb (100 kg)	RS Fr	Franklinton	Franklinton, LA
F	4	Nobal Days	6 ft 9 in (2.06 m)	220 lb (100 kg)	So	Racine Park	Racine, WI
F	5	Kevin Cross Jr.	6 ft 8 in (2.03 m)	240 lb (109 kg)	So	Mills HS; Nebraska	Little Rock, AR
F	10	Oton Jankovic	6 ft 10 in (2.08 m)	215 lb (98 kg)	So	Montverde Academy; Vanderbilt	Zagreb, Croatia
F	11	Ibrahim Ali	6 ft 10 in (2.08 m)	245 lb (111 kg)	RS So	Maumelle; Arkansas	Lagos, Nigeria
G	12	Jadan Coleman	6 ft 4 in (1.93 m)	155 lb (70 kg)	Fr	Bob Jones	Madison, AL
C	13	Buay Koka	7 ft 1 in (2.16 m)	210 lb (95 kg)	RS Jr	The Patrick School	Nasir, South Sudan
G	23	R. J. McGee	6 ft 5 in (1.96 m)	200 lb (91 kg)	So	TaylorMade Academy	Chicago, IL
G	25	Jaylen Forbes	6 ft 4 in (1.93 m)	186 lb (84 kg)	So	Florence HS; Alabama	Florence, MS
G	32	Ben Callahan-Gold (W)	6 ft 7 in (2.01 m)	205 lb (93 kg)	Fr	Northfield Mount Hermon	New York, NY
G	34	Alec Zaccardo (W)	6 ft 0 in (1.83 m)	160 lb (73 kg)	Jr	Lincoln-Sudbury Regional; MassBay CC	Boston, MA

Head coach

- Ron Hunter (Miami (OH))

Assistant coach(es)

- Ray McCallum (Ball State)
- Claude Pardue (Emory)
- Kevin Johnson (Texas–Pan American)

Legend

- (C) Team captain
- (S) Suspended
- (I) Ineligible
- (W) Walk-on
- Injured
- Current redshirt

Roster
Last update: June 29, 2020

== Schedule and results ==
=== COVID-19 impact ===
Due to the ongoing COVID-19 pandemic, the Green Wave's schedule is subject to change, including the cancellation or postponement of individual games, the cancellation of the entire season, or games played either with minimal fans or without fans in attendance and just essential personnel.

- The game vs. Tulsa scheduled for February 10 was moved to Tulsa.

=== Schedule ===
Date time, TV	Rank^{#}	Opponent^{#}	Result	Record	High points	High rebounds	High assists	Site (attendance) city, state
Regular season
November 27, 2020; 1:00 p.m., ESPN+		Lamar; Tulane Classic	W 66–57	1–0	15 – Forbes	7 – Forbes	4 – Walker	Devlin Fieldhouse (100); New Orleans, LA
November 29, 2020*; 1:00 p.m., ESPN+		Lipscomb; Tulane Classic	W 68–66	2–0	16 – Tied	8 – McGee	6 – Walker	Devlin Fieldhouse (100); New Orleans, LA
December 9, 2020*; 7:00 p.m., ESPN+		Southern Miss	W 58–38	3–0	15 – McGee	11 – McGee	6 – Walker	Devlin Fieldhouse (100); New Orleans, LA
December 12, 2020*; 1:00 p.m., ESPN+		Arkansas–Pine Bluff	W 67–56	4–0	16 – Forbes	9 – Forbes	3 – Walker	Devlin Fieldhouse (100); New Orleans, LA
December 16, 2020; 8:00 p.m., ESPN2		Memphis	L 74–80	4–1 (0–1)	18 – Watson	5 – Tied	4 – Walker	Devlin Fieldhouse (100); New Orleans, LA
December 19, 2020*; 1:00 p.m., ESPN+		Grambling State	W 77–65	5–1	21 – Forbes	6 – Tied	5 – Tied	Devlin Fieldhouse (100); New Orleans, LA
December 22, 2020; 2:30 p.m., ESPN+		at East Carolina	L 58–68	5–2 (0–2)	16 – Forbes	7 – McGee	4 – Watson	Williams Arena (65); Greenville, NC
January 2, 2020; 1:00 p.m., ESPN+		East Carolina	W 60–56	6–2 (1–2)	20 – Forbes	7 – Cross	2 – Watson	Devlin Fieldhouse (100); New Orleans, LA
January 9, 2020; 7:00 p.m., ESPNU		at No. 11 Houston	L 50–71	6–3 (1–3)	13 – Walker	6 – Pope	3 – Watson	Fertitta Center (1,859); Houston, TX
January 16, 2020; 12:00 p.m., ESPN+		Temple; Previously scheduled for Jan. 6	L 57–65	6–4 (1–4)	14 – Forbes	5 – Tied	4 – James	Devlin Fieldhouse (100); New Orleans, LA
January 20, 2020; 7:00 p.m., ESPN+		SMU	Postponed due to COVID-19 issues					Devlin Fieldhouse; New Orleans, LA
January 23, 2020; 2:00 p.m., ESPN+		at Tulsa	Postponed due to COVID-19 issues					Reynolds Center; Tulsa, OK
January 28, 2020; 8:00 p.m., ESPN		Houston	L 60–83	6–5 (1–5)	16 – Walker	9 – Cross	4 – Walker	Devlin Fieldhouse; New Orleans, LA
January 31, 2020; 11:00 a.m., ESPN+		at Temple	W 81–64	7–5 (2–5)	23 – Forbes	13 – Pope	8 – Walker	Liacouras Center; Philadelphia, PA
February 3, 2020; 7:00 p.m., ESPN+		at Wichita State	L 67–75	7–6 (2–6)	23 – Walker	8 – Pope	4 – Walker	Charles Koch Arena; Wichita, KS
February 7, 2020; 11:00 a.m., ESPN+		Cincinnati	L 61–64	7–7 (2–7)	15 – Forbes	9 – Pope	4 – Walker	Devlin Fieldhouse; New Orleans, LA
February 10, 2020; 4:00 p.m., ESPN+		at Tulsa	W 58–48	8–7 (3–7)	20 – Forbes	7 – Pope	7 – Walker	Reynolds Center (100); Tulsa, OK
February 12, 2021; 6:00 pm, ESPN+		at UCF; Previously scheduled for Dec. 30	L 49–53	8–8 (3–8)	14 – Tied	8 – Forbes	5 – Walker	Addition Financial Arena (1,420); Orlando, FL
February 14, 2021; 1:00 pm, ESPNU		at South Florida; Previously scheduled for Feb. 13	W 62–59	9–8 (4–8)	19 – Forbes	5 – Tied	4 – Walker	Yuengling Center; Tampa, FL
February 17, 2020; 7:00 p.m., ESPN+		at SMU	Postponed due to severe weather					Moody Coliseum; University Park, TX
February 20, 2020; 1:00 p.m., ESPNU		UCF	L 81–84	9–9 (4–9)	30 – Forbes	8 – Cross	10 – Walker	Devlin Fieldhouse; New Orleans, LA
February 24, 2020; 7:00 p.m., ESPN+		at Memphis	L 46–61	9–10 (4–10)	18 – Walker	10 – Forbes	3 – Walker	FedEx Forum (2,253); Memphis, TN
February 26, 2020; 3:00 p.m., ESPN+		at Cincinnati; Previously scheduled for Jan. 16	L 71–91	9–11 (4–11)	37 – Forbes	4 – James	3 – Watson	Fifth Third Arena (1,135); Cincinnati, OH
March 3, 2020; 7:00 p.m., ESPN+		Wichita State	L 70–78	9–12 (4–12)	17 – Walker	9 – McGee	4 – Walker	Devlin Fieldhouse (100); New Orleans, LA
March 6, 2020; 11:00 a.m., ESPNU		South Florida	Cancelled due to scheduling changes					Devlin Fieldhouse; New Orleans, LA
AAC tournament
March 11, 2021; 2:00 p.m., ESPNU	(10)	vs. (7) Tulsa; First Round	W 77–70	10–12	24 – Walker	7 – Tied	7 – Walker	Dickies Arena; Fort Worth, TX
March 12, 2021; 6:00 p.m., ESPN2	(10)	vs. (2) No. 7 Houston; Quarterfinals	L 52–77	10–13	11 – Cross	5 – McGee	4 – Cross	Dickies Arena; Fort Worth, TX
*Non-conference game. ^{#}Rankings from AP Poll. (#) Tournament seedings in parentheses. All times are in Central Time.

== Awards and honors ==
=== American Athletic Conference honors ===
==== All-AAC Third Team ====
- Jaylen Forbes
