= 2020–21 Wichita State Shockers men's basketball team =

American college basketball season

2020–21 Wichita State Shockers men's basketball

AAC regular season champions

NCAA tournament, First Four
- Conference: American Athletic Conference
- Record: 16–6 (11–2 AAC)
- Head coach: Isaac Brown (1st season)
- Assistant coaches: Tyson Waterman; Lou Gudino; Billy Kennedy
- Home arena: Charles Koch Arena

2020–21 American Athletic Conference men's basketball standings
	Conf.				Overall
Team	W		L	PCT	W		L	PCT
Wichita State	11	–	2	.846	16	–	6	.727
No. 6 Houston †	14	–	3	.824	28	–	4	.875
Memphis	11	–	4	.733	20	–	8	.714
SMU	7	–	4	.636	11	–	6	.647
Cincinnati	8	–	6	.571	12	–	11	.522
UCF	8	–	10	.444	11	–	12	.478
Tulsa	7	–	9	.438	11	–	12	.478
South Florida	4	–	10	.286	9	–	13	.409
Temple	4	–	10	.286	5	–	11	.313
Tulane	4	–	12	.250	10	–	13	.435
East Carolina	2	–	10	.167	8	–	11	.421
† 2021 AAC tournament winner Rankings from AP poll

The 2020–21 Wichita State Shockers men's basketball team represented Wichita State University in the 2020–21 NCAA Division I men's basketball season. They played their home games at Charles Koch Arena in Wichita, Kansas and were led by interim head coach Isaac Brown who took over as interim coach after Gregg Marshall resigned before the start of the season. Brown was promoted to full-time head coach during the season. They are members of the American Athletic Conference. They finished the season 16–6, 11–2 in AAC Play to finish in 1st place. They defeated South Florida in the quarterfinals of the AAC tournament before losing in the semifinals to Cincinnati. They received an at large-bid to the NCAA tournament where they lost in the First Four to Drake.

== Previous season ==
The Shockers finished the 2019–20 season 23–8, 11–7 in AAC play and finished in fourth place. They entered as the No. 4 seed in the AAC tournament, which was ultimately cancelled due to the coronavirus pandemic.

=== Departures ===
Name	Number	Pos.	Height	Weight	Year	Hometown	Reason
Jamarius Burton	2	G	6'3"	200	Sophomore	Charlotte, North Carolina	Transferred to Texas Tech
DeAntoni Gordon	3	F	6'7"	210	Freshman	Mobile, Alabama	Transferred to Northwest Mississippi CC
Erik Stevenson	10	G	6'3"	198	Sophomore	Lacey, Washington	Transferred to Washington
Noah Fernandes	11	G	5'11"	172	Freshman	Mattapoisett, Massachusetts	Transferred to UMass
Jaime Echenique	21	C	6'11"	258	Senior	Barranquilla, Colombia	Graduated
Tate Busse	32	G	6'2"	185	Freshman	St. Francis, Kansas	Walk–on; transferred to MSU Denver
Asbjørn Midtgaard	33	C	7'0"	267	Junior	Helsingør, Denmark	Transferred to Grand Canyon
Grant Sherfield	52	G	6'2"	189	Freshman	Wichita, Kansas	Transferred to Nevada

Morris Udeze initially entered the transfer portal in March before deciding in late April to remain with the Shockers.

=== 2020 recruiting class ===
College recruiting information
Name	Hometown	School	Height	Weight	Commit date
Ricky Council IV; G	Durham, North Carolina	Northern High School	6 ft 4 in (1.93 m)	185 lb (84 kg)	Mar 29, 2020
Ricky Council IV; G	Recruit ratings: Rivals: 247Sports: (NR)				
Chaunce Jenkins; G	Newport News, Virginia	Menchville High School	6 ft 4 in (1.93 m)	165 lb (75 kg)	Mar 29, 2020
Chaunce Jenkins; G	Recruit ratings: Rivals: (NR)				
Jaden Seymour; F	Charlotte, North Carolina	Northside Christian Academy	6 ft 7 in (2.01 m)	185 lb (84 kg)	Apr 3, 2020
Jaden Seymour; F	Recruit ratings: Rivals: 247Sports: (NR)				
Overall recruit ranking:
Note: In many cases, Scout, Rivals, 247Sports, On3, and ESPN may conflict in their listings of height and weight.; In these cases, the average was taken. ESPN grades are on a 100-point scale.; Sources: "2020 Team Ranking". Rivals.

=== Incoming transfers ===
Name	Pos.	Height	Weight	Year	Hometown	Previous school
Alterique Gilbert	G	6'0"	180	Graduate Student	Atlanta, GA	Transferred from UConn after graduating. Will have one year of eligibility beginning immediately.
Craig Porter Jr.	G	6'1"	165	Junior	Terre Haute, IN	Junior college transferred from Vincennes University.
Clarence Jackson	F	6'6"	185	Sophomore	Dublin, GA	Junior college transferred from Polk State.
Trevin Wade	G	5'11"	166	Junior	Marietta, GA	Junior college transferred from Georgia Highlands. Brother of forward Trey Wade.
Remy Robert II	G	6'2"	183	Junior	Baton Rouge, LA	Walk–on; junior college transferred from State College of Florida.

== Preseason ==
=== AAC preseason media poll ===
On October 28, The American released the preseason Poll and other preseason awards.

Coaches Poll
Predicted finish	Team	Votes (1st place)
1	Houston	99 (2)
2	Memphis	90 (2)
3	SMU	80
4	Cincinnati	77
5	South Florida	61
6	Tulsa	50
7	Wichita State	44
8	UCF	37
9	East Carolina	34
10	Temple	18
11	Tulane	15

== Roster ==
2020–21 Wichita State Shockers men's basketball team
Players
Coaches

Pos.	#	Name	Height	Weight	Year	Previous school	Hometown
G	0	Dexter Dennis	6 ft 5 in (1.96 m)	210 lb (95 kg)	Jr	Believe Academy	Baker, Louisiana
G	1	Tyson Etienne	6 ft 2 in (1.88 m)	200 lb (91 kg)	So	Putnam Science Academy	Englewood, New Jersey
G	2	Craig Porter Jr.	6 ft 2 in (1.88 m)	185 lb (84 kg)	Jr	Vincennes University	Terre Haute, Indiana
G	3	Alterique Gilbert	6 ft 0 in (1.83 m)	180 lb (82 kg)	GS	UConn	Atlanta, Georgia
G	4	Ricky Council IV	6 ft 6 in (1.98 m)	205 lb (93 kg)	Fr	Northern HS	Durham, North Carolina
F	5	Trey Wade	6 ft 6 in (1.98 m)	221 lb (100 kg)	Sr	South Plains CC	Marietta, Georgia
G	10	Remy Robert II (W)	6 ft 2 in (1.88 m)	188 lb (85 kg)	Jr	State College of Florida	Baton Rouge, Louisiana
G	11	Chaunce Jenkins	6 ft 4 in (1.93 m)	175 lb (79 kg)	Fr	Menchville HS	Newport News, Virginia
G	12	Trevin Wade	5 ft 11 in (1.8 m)	175 lb (79 kg)	Jr	Georgia Highlands	Marietta, Georgia
G	14	Jacob Herrs (W)	6 ft 2 in (1.88 m)	185 lb (84 kg)	Sr	Andover HS	Wichita, Kansas
G	15	Brycen Bush (W)	6 ft 0 in (1.83 m)	172 lb (78 kg)	Sr	Eisenhower HS	Wichita, Kansas
F	22	Jaden Seymour	6 ft 9 in (2.06 m)	205 lb (93 kg)	Fr	Northside Christian Academy	Charlotte, North Carolina
F	24	Morris Udeze	6 ft 8 in (2.03 m)	235 lb (107 kg)	Jr	Montverde Academy	Houston, Texas
F	25	Clarence Jackson	6 ft 7 in (2.01 m)	210 lb (95 kg)	So	Polk State	Dublin, Georgia
F	40	Josaphat Bilau	6 ft 10 in (2.08 m)	232 lb (105 kg)	RS Fr	Spire Academy	La Roche-sur-Yon, France
F	44	Isaiah Poor Bear-Chandler	6 ft 9 in (2.06 m)	250 lb (113 kg)	Jr	Sunrise Christian Academy	Omaha, Nebraska

Head coach

- Isaac Brown (Louisiana–Monroe)

Assistant coach(es)

- Tyson Waterman (Winthrop)
- Lou Gudino (Incarnate Word)
- Billy Kennedy (Southeastern Louisiana)

Legend

- (C) Team captain
- (S) Suspended
- (I) Ineligible
- (W) Walk-on
- Injured
- Current redshirt

Roster
Last update: August 20, 2020

== Schedule and results ==
=== COVID-19 impact ===
Due to the ongoing COVID-19 pandemic, the Shockers' schedule is subject to change, including the cancellation or postponement of individual games, the cancellation of the entire season, or games played either with minimal fans or without fans in attendance and just essential personnel.

- The Shockers were scheduled to participate in the 2020 Crossover Classic, but withdrew after multiple players tested positive for COVID-19.
- After the East Carolina game was postponed, December 30 was filled with a non-conference game vs. Newman.
- The game at East Carolina scheduled for February 21 was moved to Wichita.

=== Schedule ===
Date time, TV	Rank^{#}	Opponent^{#}	Result	Record	High points	High rebounds	High assists	Site (attendance) city, state
Regular season
December 2, 2020*; 6:00 p.m., ESPN+		Oral Roberts	W 85–80	1–0	26 – Etienne	8 – Jackson	3 – Tied	Charles Koch Arena (100); Wichita, KS
December 6, 2020*; 1:00 p.m., ESPN2		Missouri	L 62–72	1–1	14 – Tied	7 – Tied	6 – Gilbert	Charles Koch Arena (100); Wichita, KS
December 12, 2020*; 2:00 p.m., ESPN+		Oklahoma State	L 64–67	1–2	19 – Etienne	6 – Trey Wade	2 – Etienne	Charles Koch Arena (625); Wichita, KS
December 15, 2020; 6:00 p.m., ESPNU		at Tulsa; Rivalry	W 69–65	2–2 (1–0)	13 – Council IV	8 – Council IV	5 – Porter Jr.	Reynolds Center; Tulsa, OK
December 18, 2020*; 6:00 p.m., ESPN+		Emporia State	W 73–57	3–2	18 – Udeze	8 – Council IV	4 – Etienne	Charles Koch Arena (1,050); Wichita, KS
December 22, 2020; 6:00 p.m., ESPN+		at South Florida	W 82–77 ^{OT}	4–2 (2–0)	25 – Etienne	8 – Trey Wade	5 – Gilbert	Yuengling Center (519); Tampa, FL
December 30, 2020; 6:00 p.m., ESPN+		East Carolina	Cancelled due to COVID-19 issues					Charles Koch Arena; Wichita, KS
December 30, 2020*; 6:00 p.m., ESPN+		Newman	W 81–43	5–2	13 – Dennis	8 – Jackson	5 – Etienne	Charles Koch Arena (1,575); Wichita, KS
January 2, 2021*; 5:00 p.m., ESPNU		at Ole Miss; American/SEC Alliance	W 83–79	6–2	29 – Etienne	10 – Trey Wade	5 – Trey Wade	The Pavilion at Ole Miss (860); Oxford, MS
January 6, 2021; 7:00 p.m., ESPN+		at No. 11 Houston	L 63–70	6–3 (2–1)	25 – Etienne	8 – Etienne	4 – Gilbert	Fertitta Center (1,859); Houston, TX
January 10, 2021; 3:30 p.m., ESPN2		Cincinnati	W 82–76	7–3 (3–1)	23 – Council IV	6 – Council IV	3 – Tied	Charles Koch Arena (2,025); Wichita, KS
January 13, 2021; 6:00 p.m., ESPN+		Tulsa; Rivalry	W 72–53	8–3 (4–1)	20 – Tied	8 – Udeze	8 – Gilbert	Charles Koch Arena (2,048); Wichita, KS
January 21, 2021; 6:00 p.m., ESPN2		at Memphis	L 52–72	8–4 (4–2)	13 – Council IV	7 – Council IV	4 – Gilbert	FedEx Forum (2,118); Memphis, TN
January 27, 2021; 5:00 p.m., ESPN+		at Cincinnati	Postponed due to COVID-19 issues					Fifth Third Arena; Cincinnati, OH
January 30, 2021; 3:00 p.m., ESPNU		UCF	W 93–88 ^{OT}	9–4 (5–2)	29 – Etienne	8 – Jackson	7 – Gilbert	Charles Koch Arena (2,100); Wichita, KS
February 3, 2021; 7:00 p.m., ESPN+		Tulane	W 75–67	10–4 (6–2)	22 – Etienne	7 – Trey Wade	4 – Gilbert	Charles Koch Arena (2,100); Wichita, KS
February 7, 2021; 1:00 p.m., ESPNU		Temple	W 70–67	11–4 (7–2)	20 – Etienne	7 – Udeze	5 – Etienne	Charles Koch Arena (2,625); Wichita, KS
February 10, 2021; 6:00 p.m., ESPNU		at UCF	W 61–60	12–4 (8–2)	17 – Gilbert	10 – Dennis	2 – Tied	Addition Financial Arena (1,385); Orlando, FL
February 18, 2021; 6:00 p.m., ESPN/ESPN2		Memphis	Postponed due to COVID-19 issues					Charles Koch Arena; Wichita, KS
February 18, 2021; 6:00 p.m., ESPN2		No. 6 Houston; Previously scheduled for Feb. 25	W 68–63	13–4 (9–2)	16 – Tied	6 – Tied	3 – Tied	Charles Koch Arena (2,625); Wichita, KS
February 21, 2021; 11:00 a.m., ESPNU		East Carolina	Postponed due to COVID-19 issues					Charles Koch Arena; Wichita, KS
February 25, 2021; 6:00 p.m., ESPN2		SMU; Previously scheduled for Feb. 28	Postponed due to COVID-19 issues					Charles Koch Arena; Wichita, KS
February 28, 2021; 7:00 p.m., ESPNU		at SMU; Previously scheduled for Jan. 17	Postponed due to COVID-19 issues					Moody Coliseum; University Park, TX
March 3, 2021; 7:00 p.m., ESPN+		at Tulane	W 78–70	14–4 (10–2)	23 – Wade	13 – Dennis	12 – Gilbert	Devlin Fieldhouse (100); New Orleans, LA
March 6, 2021; 5:00 p.m., ESPN2		at Temple	Cancelled due to COVID-19 issues					Liacouras Center; Philadelphia, PA
March 6, 2021; 12:00 p.m., ESPN+		South Florida; Previously scheduled for Jan. 24	W 80–63	15–4 (11–2)	21 – Etienne	8 – Wade	5 – Gilbert	Charles Koch Arena (2,625); Wichita, KS
American Conference tournament
March 12, 2021; 11:00 a.m., ESPN2	(1)	vs. (8) South Florida; Quarterfinals	W 68–67	16–4	20 – Etienne	11 – Udeze	4 – Porter Jr.	Dickies Arena; Fort Worth, TX
March 13, 2021; 2:00 p.m., ESPN2	(1)	vs. (5) Cincinnati; Semifinals	L 59–60	16–5	14 – Gilbert	7 – Udeze	5 – Gilbert	Dickies Arena; Fort Worth, TX
NCAA tournament
March 18, 2021; 5:27 p.m., TBS	(11 W)	vs. (11 W) Drake; First Four	L 52–53	16–6	22 – Udeze	7 – Tied	4 – Gilbert	Mackey Arena (2,825); West Lafayette, IN
*Non-conference game. ^{#}Rankings from AP Poll. (#) Tournament seedings in parentheses. All times are in Central Time.

== Awards and honors ==
=== American Athletic Conference honors ===
==== All-AAC Awards ====
- Player of the Year: Tyson Etienne
- Coach of the Year: Isaac Brown

==== All-AAC First Team ====
- Tyson Etienne

==== All-AAC Third Team ====
- Alterique Gilbert

==== All-AAC Freshman Team ====
- Ricky Council IV
