= 2020–21 Cincinnati Bearcats men's basketball team =

American college basketball season

2020–21 Cincinnati Bearcats men's basketball
- Conference: American Athletic Conference
- Record: 12–11 (8–6 American)
- Head coach: John Brannen (2nd season)
- Assistant coaches: Jayson Gee (2nd season); Sean Dwyer (2nd season); Tim Morris (2nd season)
- Home arena: Fifth Third Arena

2020–21 American Athletic Conference men's basketball standings
	Conf.				Overall
Team	W		L	PCT	W		L	PCT
Wichita State	11	–	2	.846	16	–	6	.727
No. 6 Houston †	14	–	3	.824	28	–	4	.875
Memphis	11	–	4	.733	20	–	8	.714
SMU	7	–	4	.636	11	–	6	.647
Cincinnati	8	–	6	.571	12	–	11	.522
UCF	8	–	10	.444	11	–	12	.478
Tulsa	7	–	9	.438	11	–	12	.478
South Florida	4	–	10	.286	9	–	13	.409
Temple	4	–	10	.286	5	–	11	.313
Tulane	4	–	12	.250	10	–	13	.435
East Carolina	2	–	10	.167	8	–	11	.421
† 2021 AAC tournament winner Rankings from AP poll

The 2020–21 Cincinnati Bearcats men's basketball team represented the University of Cincinnati in the 2020–21 NCAA Division I men's basketball season. The Bearcats were led by second-year head-coach John Brannen. The team played their home games at Fifth Third Arena as members of the American Athletic Conference. They finished the season 12–11, 8–6 in AAC play to finish in fifth place. They defeated SMU and Wichita State in the AAC tournament before losing to Houston in the championship game.

On April 3, 2021, the school placed head coach Brannen on paid leave pending an investigation after six Bearcats players decided to transfer following the season. A week later, the school fired Brannen following an investigation into his conduct.

== Previous season ==
The Bearcats finished the 2019–20 season 20–10, 13–5 in AAC play, finishing tied for first place and winning a share of the regular season title. The Cats kept fans on the edge of their seats with a nation-leading seven overtime games. They entered as the No. 1 seed in the AAC tournament, which was ultimately cancelled due to the coronavirus pandemic. The Bearcats were awarded the automatic bid to the 2020 NCAA Division I men's basketball tournament by the conference, before it too was cancelled.

== Offseason ==
In the spring, Keith Williams and Chris Vogt both announced that each would enter the 2020 NBA draft, while retaining the option to return for their senior seasons. In late July, both would option to return for their final seasons of eligibility.

=== Departing players ===
Name	Number	Pos.	Height	Weight	Year	Hometown	Notes
Chris McNeal	0	G	6'1"	190	Graduate Student	Jackson, Tennessee	Completed college eligibility (Note: McNeal and Jaevin Cumberland were both graduate transfers in the 2019–20 season, with McNeal having graduated from Tennessee Tech and Cumberland from Oakland.)
Trevor Moore	5	G	6'5"	195	Junior	Houston, Texas	Transferred to Morgan State (mid-season)
Trevon Scott	13	F	6'8"	225	RS Senior	Darien, Georgia	Graduated
Jaevin Cumberland	21	G	6'3"	185	Graduate Student	Wilmington, Ohio	Completed college eligibility
Prince Toyambi	24	F	6'7"	225	RS Freshman	Kinshasa, DR Congo	Transferred to Georgia Southern
John Koz	32	G	6'1"	200	Senior	Cleveland, Ohio	Walk-on; graduated
Jarron Cumberland	34	G	6'5"	210	Senior	Wilmington, Ohio	Graduated
Jaume Sorolla	35	C	6'11"	240	Graduate Student	Tortosa, Spain	Left team (mid-season)

=== Incoming transfers ===
Name	Pos.	Height	Weight	Year	Hometown	Notes
Rapolas Ivanauskas	F	6'10"	230	Graduate Student	Barrington, IL	Transferred from Colgate after graduating. Will have one year of eligibility beginning immediately.
David DeJulius	G	6'0"	190	Junior	Detroit, MI	Transferred from Michigan. DeJulius was granted a waiver for immediate eligibility. Will have two years of remaining eligibility.

=== 2020 recruiting class ===
College recruiting information
Name	Hometown	School	Height	Weight	Commit date
Mike Saunders; PG	Indianapolis, IN	Wasatch Academy	6 ft 0 in (1.83 m)	165 lb (75 kg)	June 11, 2019
Mike Saunders; PG	Recruit ratings: Rivals: 247Sports: (80)				
Gabe Madsen; SF	Rochester, MN	Mayo High School	6 ft 6 in (1.98 m)	180 lb (82 kg)	August 31, 2019
Gabe Madsen; SF	Recruit ratings: Rivals: 247Sports: (80)				
Mason Madsen; CG	Rochester, MN	Mayo High School	6 ft 3 in (1.91 m)	175 lb (79 kg)	August 31, 2019
Mason Madsen; CG	Recruit ratings: Rivals: 247Sports: (NR)				
Tari Eason; PF	Seattle, WA	Garfield High School	6 ft 8 in (2.03 m)	210 lb (95 kg)	December 21, 2019
Tari Eason; PF	Recruit ratings: Rivals: 247Sports: (79)				
Viktor Lakhin; C	Anapa, Russia	CSKA Moscow	6 ft 10 in (2.08 m)	218 lb (99 kg)	June 15, 2020
Viktor Lakhin; C	Recruit ratings: 247Sports: (NR)				
Overall recruit ranking: 247Sports: 39
Note: In many cases, Scout, Rivals, 247Sports, On3, and ESPN may conflict in their listings of height and weight.; In these cases, the average was taken. ESPN grades are on a 100-point scale.; Sources: "Cincinnati 2020 Basketball Commitments". Rivals.; "2020 Cincinnati Bearcats Recruiting Class". ESPN.; "2020 Team Ranking". Rivals.; "2020 Cincinnati Bearcats Basketball 24/7 Sports Commits". 247Sports.

== Preseason ==
=== AAC preseason media poll ===
On October 28, The American released the preseason Poll and other preseason awards

Coaches Poll
Predicted finish	Team	Votes (1st place)
1	Houston	99 (2)
2	Memphis	90 (2)
3	SMU	80
4	Cincinnati	77
5	South Florida	61
6	Tulsa	50
7	Wichita State	44
8	UCF	37
9	East Carolina	34
10	Temple	18
11	Tulane	15

=== Preseason awards ===
- All-AAC First Team - Keith Williams
- All-AAC Second Team - Chris Vogt

== Roster ==
2020–21 Cincinnati Bearcats men's basketball team
Players
Coaches

Pos.	#	Name	Height	Weight	Year	Previous school	Hometown
G	0	David DeJulius	6 ft 0 in (1.83 m)	195 lb (88 kg)	Jr	Michigan	Detroit, Michigan
G	1	Zach Harvey (I)	6 ft 5 in (1.96 m)	195 lb (88 kg)	So	Prolific Prep	Topeka, Kansas
G	2	Keith Williams	6 ft 5 in (1.96 m)	215 lb (98 kg)	Sr	Bishop Loughlin Memorial High School	Brooklyn, New York
G	3	Mike Saunders Jr.	6 ft 0 in (1.83 m)	190 lb (86 kg)	Fr	Wasatch Academy	Indianapolis, Indiana
F	13	Tari Eason	6 ft 8 in (2.03 m)	215 lb (98 kg)	Fr	Garfield High School	Seattle, Washington
F	20	Mamoudou Diarra	6 ft 9 in (2.06 m)	225 lb (102 kg)	RS Jr	22ft Academy	Bamako, Mali
G	23	Mika Adams-Woods	6 ft 3 in (1.91 m)	185 lb (84 kg)	So	New Hampton School	Syracuse, New York
G	24	Jeremiah Davenport	6 ft 7 in (2.01 m)	205 lb (93 kg)	So	Hargrave Military Academy	Cincinnati, Ohio
F	30	Viktor Lakhin (injured)	6 ft 11 in (2.11 m)	228 lb (103 kg)	Fr	CSKA–2	Anapa, Russia
G	31	Sam Martin (W)	5 ft 10 in (1.78 m)	170 lb (77 kg)	Sr	Summit Country Day School	Cincinnati, Ohio
C	33	Chris Vogt	7 ft 1 in (2.16 m)	260 lb (118 kg)	Sr	Northern Kentucky	Mayfield, Kentucky
F	43	Rob Banks (W)	6 ft 5 in (1.96 m)	210 lb (95 kg)	So	Gould Academy	Bracknell, England
F	44	Adam Cook (W)	6 ft 6 in (1.98 m)	180 lb (82 kg)	Sr	Marysville High School	Marysville, Ohio
G	45	Mason Madsen	6 ft 4 in (1.93 m)	190 lb (86 kg)	Fr	Mayo High School	Rochester, Minnesota
G	55	Gabe Madsen (I)	6 ft 5 in (1.96 m)	195 lb (88 kg)	Fr	Mayo High School	Rochester, Minnesota

Head coach

- John Brannen (Marshall)

Assistant coach(es)

- Jayson Gee (Charleston (WV))
- Sean Dwyer (Michigan State)
- Tim Morris (Stanford)

Legend

- (C) Team captain
- (S) Suspended
- (I) Ineligible
- (W) Walk-on
- (LT) Left team
- Injured
- Current redshirt

Roster
Last update: August 27, 2020

- Preseason: Viktor Lahkin underwent knee surgery, leading him to sit out indefinitely.
- December 12, 2020: Mamoudou Diarra decided to opt-out of the rest of the season due to COVID-19 concerns.
- December 30, 2020: Mamoudou Diarra decided to rejoin the team, while Rapolas Ivanauskas had elected to leave the team to pursue a professional career.
- December 31, 2020: Gabe Madsen announced he has elected to opt-out for the remainder of the season.
- February 16, 2021: Zach Harvey decided to opt-out of the rest of the season.
- February 25, 2021: David DeJulius decided to opt-out of the rest of the season.
- March 11, 2021: David DeJulius decided to rejoin the team.

== Schedule and results ==
The Bearcats are currently scheduled to travel to Knoxville for the second part of a home-and-home series with Tennessee and begin a home-and-home series on the road at Georgia. Cincinnati and Xavier announced they would maintain the Crosstown Shootout during the season.

=== COVID-19 impact ===
Due to the ongoing COVID-19 pandemic, the Bearcats schedule is subject to change, including the cancellation or postponement of individual games, the cancellation of the entire season, or games played either with minimal fans or without fans in attendance and just essential personnel.

- 3 previously scheduled games were cancelled (vs. Louisville, vs. Richmond, @ NKU), as well as the Bearcats appearance in the NIT Season Tip-Off (alongside Arizona, Texas Tech and St. John's). As a response to all these outcomes, UC attempted to organize an Indianapolis-based MTE alongside Duquesne and Loyola-Chicago. Ironically, that too would be cancelled due to COVID.
- The games vs. Temple originally scheduled for February 4 was moved to Philadelphia.
- The game @ Temple rescheduled for February 12 was moved to Cincinnati.
- The games vs. Houston originally scheduled for February 21 was moved to Houston.
- Cincinnati added a game vs. Vanderbilt on March 4 after a previously scheduled game was cancelled.

Prior to the start of the season, UC announced there would be no fans in Fifth Third Arena; only permitting fans in the arena later in the season if it's safe and appropriate to do so. UC was later granted an attendance variance by the State of Ohio which allows for crowds of around 1,135 fans inside the arena for games against Tulane (Feb. 26), Memphis (Feb. 28) and SMU, rescheduled as Vanderbilt, (March 4).

=== Schedule ===
- Unless otherwise noted, all games had limited or no attendance.

Date time, TV	Rank^{#}	Opponent^{#}	Result	Record	High points	High rebounds	High assists	Site (attendance) city, state
Regular Season
December 2, 2020*; 5:00 p.m., ESPN+		Lipscomb	W 67–55	1–0	16 – Adams-Woods	7 – Vogt	4 – Tied	Fifth Third Arena (300); Cincinnati, OH
December 6, 2020*; 3:00 p.m., ESPN		Xavier; Crosstown Shootout	L 69–77	1–1	18 – Williams	8 – Eason	6 – DeJulius	Fifth Third Arena (300); Cincinnati, OH
December 9, 2020*; 5:00 p.m., ESPN+		Furman	W 78–73	2–1	27 – Williams	9 – DeJulius	5 – DeJulius	Fifth Third Arena (300); Cincinnati, OH
December 12, 2020*; 12:30 p.m., SECN Alt.		at No. 12 Tennessee	L 56–65	2–2	14 – Davenport	7 – Eason	7 – DeJulius	Thompson–Boling Arena (4,191); Knoxville, TN
December 16, 2020; 7:00 p.m., ESPN2		South Florida	L 71–74	2–3 (0–1)	15 – Williams	9 – Eason	4 – Saunders Jr.	Fifth Third Arena (300); Cincinnati, OH
December 19, 2020*; 8:00 p.m., SECN		at Georgia	L 68–83	2–4	18 – Davenport	6 – Tied	2 – Tied	Stegeman Coliseum (1,638); Athens, GA
December 22, 2020; 4:00 p.m., ESPN+		at UCF	L 70–75	2–5 (0–2)	19 – Williams	10 – Williams	5 – DeJulius	Addition Financial Arena (1,181); Orlando, FL
January 2, 2021; 3:00 p.m., ESPN+		Tulsa	L 66–70	2–6 (0–3)	18 – Williams	7 – Tied	4 – DeJulius	Fifth Third Arena (300); Cincinnati, OH
January 6, 2021; 7:00 p.m., ESPNU		at SMU	W 76–69	3–6 (1–3)	18 – Davenport	10 – Davenport	12 – DeJulius	Moody Coliseum (1,568); University Park, TX
January 10, 2021; 4:30 p.m., ESPN2		at Wichita State	L 76–82	3–7 (1–4)	19 – Harvey	6 – Tied	7 – DeJulius	Charles Koch Arena (2,025); Wichita, KS
January 13, 2021; 5:00 p.m., ESPN+		East Carolina	Postponed due to COVID-19 issues					Fifth Third Arena (–); Cincinnati, OH
January 23, 2021; Noon, CBS		at No. 8 Houston	Postponed due to COVID-19 issues					Fertitta Center (–); Houston, TX
January 27, 2021; 6:00 p.m., ESPN+		Wichita State	Postponed due to COVID-19 issues					Fifth Third Arena (–); Cincinnati, OH
January 30, 2021; 6:00 p.m., ESPNU		at South Florida	Postponed due to COVID-19 issues					Yuengling Center (–); Tampa, FL
February 4, 2021; 7:00 p.m., ESPN2		at Temple	W 63–60	4–7 (2–4)	26 – DeJulius	7 – Davenport	3 – Tied	Liacouras Center; Philadelphia, PA
February 7, 2021; 12:00 p.m., ESPN+		at Tulane	W 64–61	5–7 (3–4)	20 – Williams	9 – Eason	4 – DeJulius	Devlin Fieldhouse; New Orleans, LA
February 11, 2021; 7:00 p.m., ESPN2		at Memphis; Rivalry	Postponed due to COVID-19 issues					FedEx Forum (–); Memphis, TN
February 12, 2021; 7:00 p.m., ESPN+		Temple; Previously scheduled for Jan. 12	W 71–69	6–7 (4–4)	12 – Tied	8 – Tied	6 – Davenport	Fifth Third Arena (300); Cincinnati, OH
February 14, 2021; 1:00 p.m., ESPN+		UCF	W 69–68	7–7 (5–4)	14 – Tied	8 – Williams	4 – Williams	Fifth Third Arena (300); Cincinnati, OH
February 21, 2021; 1:00 p.m., ESPN		at No. 6 Houston	L 52–90	7–8 (5–5)	11 – Davenport	5 – Eason	3 – Vogt	Fertitta Center (1,859); Houston, TX
February 24, 2021; 9:00 p.m., ESPNU		at Tulsa	W 70–69	8–8 (6–5)	24 – Williams	8 – DeJulius	6 – Williams	Reynolds Center (100); Tulsa, OK
February 26, 2021; 4:00 p.m., ESPN+		Tulane; Previously scheduled for Jan. 16	W 91–71	9–8 (7–5)	27 – Davenport	13 – Eason	7 – Adams–Woods	Fifth Third Arena (1,135); Cincinnati, OH
February 28, 2021; 1:00 p.m., ESPN		Memphis; Rivalry	L 74–80	9–9 (7–6)	19 – Tied	7 – Vogt	6 – Williams	Fifth Third Arena (1,135); Cincinnati, OH
March 4, 2021; 7:00 p.m., ESPNU		SMU	Cancelled due to COVID-19 issues					Fifth Third Arena (–); Cincinnati, OH
March 4, 2021*; 7:00 p.m., ESPN+		Vanderbilt	L 68–74	9–10 (7–6)	20 – Williams	6 – Davenport	5 – Davenport	Fifth Third Arena (2,000); Cincinnati, OH
March 7, 2021; 1:00 p.m., ESPN+		at East Carolina	W 82–69	10–10 (8–6)	19 – Tied	7 – Tied	5 – Tied	Williams Arena (439); Greenville, NC
AAC Tournament
March 12, 2021; 3:00 p.m., ESPN2	(5)	vs. (4) SMU; Quarterfinals	W 74–71	11–10	19 – Davenport	7 – Tied	6 – Williams	Dickies Arena (778); Fort Worth, TX
March 13, 2021; 3:00 p.m., ESPN2	(5)	vs. (1) Wichita State; Semifinals	W 60–59	12–10	10 – M. Madsen	11 – Eason	4 – Tied	Dickies Arena; Fort Worth, TX
March 14, 2021; 3:15 p.m., ESPN	(5)	vs. (2) No. 7 Houston; Championship	L 54–91	12–11	11 – Davenport	6 – Tied	2 – Tied	Dickies Arena; Fort Worth, TX
*Non-conference game. ^{#}Rankings from AP Poll. (#) Tournament seedings in parentheses. All times are in Eastern Time.

== Awards and honors ==
=== American Athletic Conference honors ===
==== All-AAC Second Team ====
- Keith Williams

==== All-AAC Freshman Team ====
- Tari Eason

==== Weekly honor roll ====
- Week 3: David DeJulius
- Week 5: Keith Williams
- Week 7: Zach Harvey
- Week 11: David DeJulius
- Week 12: Mika Adams-Woods
- Week 15: Jeremiah Davenport
- Week 16: Keith Williams
