= 2020–21 South Florida Bulls men's basketball team =

American college basketball season

2020–21 South Florida Bulls men's basketball
- Conference: American Athletic Conference
- Record: 9–13 (4–10 AAC)
- Head coach: Brian Gregory (4th season)
- Assistant coaches: Tom Herrion; Scott Wagers; Larry Dixon
- Home arena: Yuengling Center

2020–21 American Athletic Conference men's basketball standings
	Conf.				Overall
Team	W		L	PCT	W		L	PCT
Wichita State	11	–	2	.846	16	–	6	.727
No. 6 Houston †	14	–	3	.824	28	–	4	.875
Memphis	11	–	4	.733	20	–	8	.714
SMU	7	–	4	.636	11	–	6	.647
Cincinnati	8	–	6	.571	12	–	11	.522
UCF	8	–	10	.444	11	–	12	.478
Tulsa	7	–	9	.438	11	–	12	.478
South Florida	4	–	10	.286	9	–	13	.409
Temple	4	–	10	.286	5	–	11	.313
Tulane	4	–	12	.250	10	–	13	.435
East Carolina	2	–	10	.167	8	–	11	.421
† 2021 AAC tournament winner Rankings from AP poll

The 2020–21 South Florida Bulls men's basketball team represented the University of South Florida during the 2020–21 NCAA Division I men's basketball season. The season marked the 49th basketball season for USF, the eighth as a member of the American Athletic Conference, and the fourth season under head coach Brian Gregory. The Bulls play their home games at Yuengling Center on the university's Tampa, Florida campus. The season ended on March 12, 2021 with a 68–67 loss to regular season conference champion Wichita State in the second round of the AAC tournament.

== Previous season ==
The Bulls finished the 2019–20 season 14–17, 7–11 in AAC play to finish in ninth place. They entered as the No. 9 seed in the AAC tournament, which was ultimately cancelled due to the coronavirus pandemic.

== Offseason ==
=== Departures ===
Name	Number	Pos.	Height	Weight	Year	Hometown	Reason for departure
Laquincy Rideau	3	G	6'1"	205	Senior	West Palm Beach, FL	Graduated
B.J. Mack	33	F	6'8"	261	Freshman	Charlotte, NC	Transferred to Wofford
Antun Maricevic	34	F	6'10"	260	Senior	Zagreb, Croatia	Graduated

=== Incoming transfers ===
Name	Pos.	Height	Weight	Year	Hometown	Previous school
Luke Anderson	F	6'8"	215	RS Freshman	Lakeland, FL	Transferred from Iowa State during the 2019–20 season. Anderson will be eligible immediately. Anderson has four years of remaining eligibility.
Prince Oduro	F	6'8"	250	RS Junior	Toronto, Canada	Transferred from Mississippi State. Oduro was granted a waiver for immediate eligibility. Will have two years of remaining eligibility.
Russel Tchewa	C	7'0"	260	Sophomore	Douala, Cameroon	Transferred from Texas Tech. Tchewa was granted a waiver for immediate eligibility. Will have three years of remaining eligibility.

=== 2020 recruiting class ===
College recruiting information
Name	Hometown	School	Height	Weight	Commit date
Caleb Murphy; SG	Loganville, GA	Grayson High School	6 ft 2 in (1.88 m)	170 lb (77 kg)	Sep 1, 2019
Caleb Murphy; SG	Recruit ratings: Scout: Rivals: 247Sports: (80)				
Overall recruit ranking:
Note: In many cases, Scout, Rivals, 247Sports, On3, and ESPN may conflict in their listings of height and weight.; In these cases, the average was taken. ESPN grades are on a 100-point scale.; Sources: "2020 Team Ranking". Rivals.

=== 2021 recruiting class ===
College recruiting information (2021)
Name	Hometown	School	Height	Weight	Commit date
Trey Moss; PG	Windermere, FL	Windermere Prep	6 ft 3 in (1.91 m)	170 lb (77 kg)	Jun 12, 2020
Trey Moss; PG	Recruit ratings: Rivals: 247Sports: (NR)				
Overall recruit ranking:
Note: In many cases, Scout, Rivals, 247Sports, On3, and ESPN may conflict in their listings of height and weight.; In these cases, the average was taken. ESPN grades are on a 100-point scale.; Sources: "2021 Team Ranking". Rivals.

== Preseason ==
=== AAC preseason media poll ===
On October 28, The American released the preseason Poll and other preseason awards

Coaches Poll
Predicted finish	Team	Votes (1st place)
1	Houston	99 (2)
2	Memphis	90 (2)
3	SMU	80
4	Cincinnati	77
5	South Florida	61
6	Tulsa	50
7	Wichita State	44
8	UCF	37
9	East Carolina	34
10	Temple	18
11	Tulane	15

=== Preseason Awards ===
- All-AAC Second Team - Alexis Yetna

== Roster ==
2020–21 South Florida Bulls men's basketball team
Players
Coaches

Pos.	#	Name	Height	Weight	Year	Previous school	Hometown
G	0	David Collins	6 ft 4 in (1.93 m)	218 lb (99 kg)	Sr	First Love Christian Academy	Youngstown, Ohio
G	1	Xavier Castaneda	6 ft 1 in (1.85 m)	188 lb (85 kg)	Jr	Whitney High School	Chicago, Illinois
G	2	Ezacuras Dawson III	6 ft 3 in (1.91 m)	200 lb (91 kg)	RS Jr	Oklahoma State	Miami, Florida
F	3	Prince Oduro	6 ft 8 in (2.03 m)	250 lb (113 kg)	RS Jr	Mississippi State	Toronto, Canada
F	4	Michael Durr	7 ft 0 in (2.13 m)	250 lb (113 kg)	Jr	Victory Rock Prep	Bradenton, Florida
F	5	Rashun Williams	6 ft 6 in (1.98 m)	222 lb (101 kg)	Jr	Calhoun County High School	Edison, Georgia
F	10	Alexis Yetna	6 ft 8 in (2.03 m)	234 lb (106 kg)	RS Jr	Putnam Science Academy	Paris, France
G	11	Mark Calleja (W)	6 ft 2 in (1.88 m)	190 lb (86 kg)	Jr	Hudson High School	Hudson, Florida
G/F	13	Justin Brown	6 ft 6 in (1.98 m)	218 lb (99 kg)	Sr	Hargrave Military Academy	Birmingham, Alabama
F	22	Madut Akec	6 ft 7 in (2.01 m)	208 lb (94 kg)	RS So	Victory Rock Prep	Bradenton, Florida
G	23	Caleb Murphy	6 ft 4 in (1.93 m)	170 lb (77 kg)	Fr	Grayson High School	Loganville, Georgia
G	24	Jamir Chaplin	6 ft 5 in (1.96 m)	197 lb (89 kg)	So	Meadowcreek High School	Norcross, Georgia
G/F	44	Luke Anderson	6 ft 8 in (2.03 m)	215 lb (98 kg)	RS Fr	Iowa State	Lakeland, Florida
C	54	Russel Tchewa	7 ft 0 in (2.13 m)	260 lb (118 kg)	So	Putnam Science Academy	Douala, Cameroon

Head coach

- Brian Gregory (Oakland)

Assistant coach(es)

- Tom Herrion (Merrimack)
- Scott Wagers (Tennessee Wesleyan)
- Larry Dixon (Johnson C. Smith)

Legend

- (C) Team captain
- (S) Suspended
- (I) Ineligible
- (W) Walk-on
- Injured
- Current redshirt

Roster
Last update: June 25, 2020

== Schedule and results ==
=== COVID-19 impact ===
Due to the ongoing COVID-19 pandemic, the Bulls' schedule is subject to change, including the cancellation or postponement of individual games, the cancellation of the entire season, or games played either with minimal fans or without fans in attendance and just essential personnel.

- The game vs. Florida A&M scheduled for December 4 was cancelled due to COVID-19 issues.
- USF was originally scheduled to play LSU instead of Wofford on December 12, but LSU pulled out of the Hoopsgiving event due to COVID-19.
- The game vs. Temple rescheduled for February 21 was moved to Philadelphia.
- The game vs. SMU scheduled for February 20 was moved to Dallas.
- The game @ Temple scheduled for February 24 was moved to Tampa.

=== Schedule ===
Date time, TV	Rank^{#}	Opponent^{#}	Result	Record	High points	High rebounds	High assists	Site (attendance) city, state
Regular season
November 25, 2020*; 11:30 a.m., ESPN+		Florida College	W 94–84	1–0	17 – Collins	7 – Chaplin	7 – Murphy	Yuengling Center; Tampa, FL
November 28, 2020*; 5:30 p.m., ESPN3		vs. Rhode Island; Hall of Fame Tip Off	L 68–84	1–1	16 – Collins	7 – Durr	4 – Collins	Mohegan Sun Arena; Uncasville, CT
November 29, 2020*; 8:00 p.m., ESPN2		vs. Virginia Tech; Hall of Fame Tip Off	L 58–76	1–2	11 – Murphy	7 – Durr	2 – Murphy	Mohegan Sun Arena; Uncasville, CT
December 2, 2020*; 5:00 p.m., ESPN+		Florida Gulf Coast	W 76–57	2–2	14 – Durr	9 – Durr	5 – Collins	Yuengling Center; Tampa, FL
December 8, 2020*; 5:00 p.m., ESPN+		Stetson	W 73–62	3–2	18 – Collins	9 – Collins	6 – Murphy	Yuengling Center; Tampa, FL
December 12, 2020*; 12:00 p.m., ESPNews		vs. Wofford; Holiday Hoopsgiving	W 58–56	4–2	13 – Collins	11 – Collins	3 – Collins	State Farm Arena; Atlanta, GA
December 16, 2020; 7:00 p.m., ESPN2		at Cincinnati	W 74–71	5–2 (1–0)	16 – Yetna	12 – Yetna	4 – Tied	Fifth Third Arena (300); Cincinnati, OH
December 22, 2020; 7:00 p.m., ESPN+		Wichita State	L 77–82 ^{OT}	5–3 (1–1)	17 – Collins	14 – Tied	6 – Murphy	Yuengling Center (519); Tampa, FL
December 29, 2020; 7:00 p.m., ESPN2		at Memphis	L 57–58	5–4 (1–2)	20 – Murphy	10 – Durr	3 – Murphy	FedEx Forum (133); Memphis, TN
January 2, 2021; 7:00 p.m., ESPN+		UCF; War on I-4	W 68–61	6–4 (2–2)	19 – Collins	11 – Durr	7 – Collins	Yuengling Center (1,016); Tampa, FL
January 6, 2021; 4:00 p.m., ESPN+		Tulsa	L 51–61	6–5 (2–3)	16 – Chaplin	11 – Durr	4 – Murphy	Yuengling Center; Tampa, FL
January 9, 2021; 1:00 p.m., ESPN+		at East Carolina	W 69–63	7–5 (3–3)	16 – Collins	6 – Yetna	5 – Collins	Williams Arena (67); Greenville, NC
January 20, 2021; 7:00 p.m., ESPN+		East Carolina	Postponed due to COVID-19 issues					Yuengling Center; Tampa, FL
January 30, 2021; 6:00 p.m., ESPN+		Cincinnati	Postponed due to COVID-19 issues					Yuengling Center; Tampa, FL
February 3, 2021; 9:00 p.m., ESPNU		at Tulsa	Postponed due to COVID-19 issues					Reynolds Center; Tulsa, OK
February 6, 2021; 12:00 p.m., ESPNU		at SMU	Postponed due to COVID-19 issues					Moody Coliseum; University Park, TX
February 10, 2021; 7:00 p.m., ESPNU		Houston; Previously scheduled for Jan. 14	L 65–82	7–6 (3–4)	18 – Collins	7 – Durr	4 – Collins	Yuengling Center (629); Tampa, FL
February 14, 2021; 2:00 p.m., ESPNU		Tulane; Previously scheduled for Feb. 13	L 59–62	7–7 (3–5)	16 – Brown	8 – Tied	6 – Castaneda	Yuengling Center; Tampa, FL
February 17, 2021; 7:00 p.m., ESPNU		at UCF; War on I-4	L 65–81	7–8 (3–6)	16 – Yetna	15 – Yetna	3 – Castaneda	Addition Financial Arena (1,764); Orlando, FL
February 20, 2021; 12:00 p.m., ESPNU		at SMU	Postponed due to COVID-19 issues					Moody Coliseum; University Park, TX
February 21, 2021; 2:00 p.m., ESPN+		at Temple; Previously scheduled for Jan. 27	W 83–76	8–8 (4–6)	18 – Castaneda	7 – Yetna	4 – Collins	Liacouras Center; Philadelphia, PA
February 24, 2021; 7:00 p.m.		Temple	L 47–65	8–9 (4–7)	16 – Brown	6 – Tied	3 – Murphy	Yuengling Center (471); Tampa, FL
February 28, 2021; 4:00 p.m., ESPNU		at Houston	L 52–98	8–10 (4–8)	11 – Castaneda	7 – Castaneda	5 – Collins	Fertitta Center (1,859); Houston, TX
March 2, 2021; 9:00 p.m., ESPNU		Memphis; Previously scheduled for Mar. 3	L 52–73	8–11 (4–9)	17 – Castaneda	5 – Castaneda	4 – Castaneda	Yuengling Center (1,222); Tampa, FL
March 6, 2021; 12:00 p.m., ESPNU		at Tulane	Cancelled due to scheduling changes					Devlin Fieldhouse; New Orleans, LA
March 6, 2021; 1:00 p.m., ESPN+		at Wichita State; Previously scheduled for Jan. 24	L 63–80	8–12 (4–10)	18 – Durr	9 – Durr	6 – Castaneda	Charles Koch Arena (2,625); Wichita, KS
AAC tournament
March 11, 2021; 12:00 pm, ESPNU	(8)	vs. (9) Temple; First Round	W 73–71	9–12	23 – Collins	11 – Durr	4 – Murphy	Dickies Arena; Fort Worth, TX
March 11, 2021; 12:00 pm, ESPN2	(8)	vs. (1) Wichita State; Quarterfinals	L 67–68	9–13	13 – Durr	13 – Durr	3 – Tied	Dickies Arena; Fort Worth, TX
*Non-conference game. ^{#}Rankings from AP Poll. (#) Tournament seedings in parentheses. All times are in Eastern Time.

== Awards and honors ==
=== AAC Player of the Week ===
- Week 3 – David Collins

=== AAC Freshman of the Week ===
- Week 5 – Caleb Murphy
- Week 6 – Caleb Murphy

=== AAC All-Freshman Team ===
- Caleb Murphy

== See also ==
2020–21 South Florida Bulls women's basketball team
