= 2020–21 SMU Mustangs men's basketball team =

American college basketball season

2020–21 SMU Mustangs men's basketball

NIT, First Round
- Conference: American Athletic Conference
- Record: 11–6 (7–4 AAC)
- Head coach: Tim Jankovich (5th season)
- Assistant coaches: Jay Duncan; Yaphett King; John Cooper
- Home arena: Moody Coliseum

2020–21 American Athletic Conference men's basketball standings
| | Conf. | | | | Overall |
| Team | W | | L | PCT | W | | L | PCT |
|---|---|---|---|---|---|---|---|---|
| Wichita State | 11 | – | 2 | .846 | 16 | – | 6 | .727 |
| No. 6 Houston † | 14 | – | 3 | .824 | 28 | – | 4 | .875 |
| Memphis | 11 | – | 4 | .733 | 20 | – | 8 | .714 |
| SMU | 7 | – | 4 | .636 | 11 | – | 6 | .647 |
| Cincinnati | 8 | – | 6 | .571 | 12 | – | 11 | .522 |
| UCF | 8 | – | 10 | .444 | 11 | – | 12 | .478 |
| Tulsa | 7 | – | 9 | .438 | 11 | – | 12 | .478 |
| South Florida | 4 | – | 10 | .286 | 9 | – | 13 | .409 |
| Temple | 4 | – | 10 | .286 | 5 | – | 11 | .313 |
| Tulane | 4 | – | 12 | .250 | 10 | – | 13 | .435 |
| East Carolina | 2 | – | 10 | .167 | 8 | – | 11 | .421 |
† 2021 AAC tournament winner Rankings from AP poll

The 2020–21 SMU Mustangs men's basketball team represented Southern Methodist University during the 2020–21 NCAA Division I men's basketball season. The Mustangs, led by fifth-year head coach Tim Jankovich, played their home games at Moody Coliseum on their campus in University Park, Texas as members of the American Athletic Conference (AAC). They finished the season 11–6, 7–4 in AAC play, to finish in fourth place. They lost in the quarterfinals of the AAC tournament to Cincinnati. They received an invitation to the NIT where they lost in the first round to Boise State.

== Previous season ==
The Mustangs finished the 2019–20 season 19–11, 9–9 in AAC play, to finish in seventh place. They entered as the No. 7 seed in the AAC tournament, which was ultimately cancelled due to the COVID-19 pandemic.

== Offseason ==
=== Departures ===
| Name | Number | Pos. | Height | Weight | Year | Hometown | Notes |
|---|---|---|---|---|---|---|---|
| C. J. White | 13 | G | 6'5" | 185 | Junior | Little Rock, AR | Walk-on; transferred to Little Rock |
| Isiaha Mike | 15 | F | 6'8" | 215 | RS Junior | Scarborough, ON | Played professionally |
| Grant Youngkin | 20 | G | 6'3" | 190 | RS Junior | Washington, D.C. | Walk-on; not on team roster |

=== Incoming transfers ===
| Name | Pos. | Height | Weight | Year | Hometown | Notes |
|---|---|---|---|---|---|---|
| Yor Anei | F | 6'10" | 235 | Junior | Overland Park, KS | Transferred from Oklahoma State. Anei was granted a waiver for immediate eligibility on December 16 and will have two years of remaining eligibility. |

=== 2020 recruiting class ===
SMU did not sign any recruits for the 2020 class.

=== 2021 recruiting class ===
College recruiting information (2021)
| Name | Hometown | School | Height | Weight | Commit date |
|---|---|---|---|---|---|
| Jalen Smith; PG | Orlando, FL | Oak Ridge High School | 6 ft 3 in (1.91 m) | 180 lb (82 kg) | 08/30/20 |
| Jalen Smith; PG | Recruit ratings: Rivals: 247Sports: (NR) | | | | |
Overall recruit ranking:
Note: In many cases, Scout, Rivals, 247Sports, On3, and ESPN may conflict in their listings of height and weight.; In these cases, the average was taken. ESPN grades are on a 100-point scale.; Sources: "SMU 2021 Basketball Commitments". Rivals.; "2022 Team Ranking". Rivals.; "2021 SMU Mustangs Basketball 24/7 Sports Commits". 247Sports.

== Preseason ==
=== AAC preseason media poll ===
On October 28, The American released the preseason poll and other preseason awards.

Coaches Poll
| Predicted finish | Team | Votes (1st place) |
| 1 | Houston | 99 (2) |
| 2 | Memphis | 90 (2) |
| 3 | SMU | 80 |
| 4 | Cincinnati | 77 |
| 5 | South Florida | 61 |
| 6 | Tulsa | 50 |
| 7 | Wichita State | 44 |
| 8 | UCF | 37 |
| 9 | East Carolina | 34 |
| 10 | Temple | 18 |
| 11 | Tulane | 15 |

=== Preseason awards ===
- All-AAC First Team – Kendric Davis
- All-AAC Second Team – Tyson Jolly

== Roster ==
2020–21 SMU Mustangs men's basketball team
Players
Coaches

| Pos. | # | Name | Height | Weight | Year | Previous school | Hometown |
|---|---|---|---|---|---|---|---|
| G | 0 | Tyson Jolly | 6 ft 4 in (1.93 m) | 190 lb (86 kg) | RS Sr | Trinity Valley CC | Muskogee, OK |
| F | 1 | Feron Hunt | 6 ft 8 in (2.03 m) | 195 lb (88 kg) | Jr | DeSoto High School | DeSoto, TX |
| G | 2 | Darius McNeill | 6 ft 3 in (1.91 m) | 185 lb (84 kg) | RS Jr | California | Houston, TX |
| G | 3 | Kendric Davis | 5 ft 11 in (1.8 m) | 180 lb (82 kg) | Jr | TCU | Houston, TX |
| G | 4 | Charles Smith IV | 6 ft 5 in (1.96 m) | 185 lb (84 kg) | So | Wheeler High School | Atlanta, GA |
| G | 5 | Emmanuel Bandoumel | 6 ft 4 in (1.93 m) | 180 lb (82 kg) | Jr | Hill College | Quebec City, QC |
| G | 10 | Yor Anei | 6 ft 10 in (2.08 m) | 235 lb (107 kg) | Jr | Oklahoma State | Overland Park, KS |
| G | 14 | William Douglas | 6 ft 5 in (1.96 m) | 193 lb (88 kg) | RS Jr | Christian Brothers High School | Memphis, TN |
| F | 21 | Jahmar Young Jr. | 6 ft 9 in (2.06 m) | 215 lb (98 kg) | RS So | DeSoto High School | DeSoto, TX |
| F | 22 | Isiah Jasey | 6 ft 10 in (2.08 m) | 250 lb (113 kg) | Sr | Texas A&M | Killeen, TX |
| G | 23 | Alex Tabor Jr. (W) | 6 ft 2 in (1.88 m) | 175 lb (79 kg) | So | Charlotte Country Day | Charlotte, NC |
| F | 24 | Everett Ray | 6 ft 7 in (2.01 m) | 220 lb (100 kg) | RS Jr | Trinity Christian Academy | Irving, TX |
| F | 25 | Ethan Chargois | 6 ft 9 in (2.06 m) | 235 lb (107 kg) | Sr | Union High School | Tulsa, OK |
| G | 33 | Darius McBride | 6 ft 4 in (1.93 m) | 190 lb (86 kg) | RS Fr | Westlake High School | Cedar Park, TX |

Head coach

- Tim Jankovich (Kansas State)

Assistant coach(es)

- Jay Duncan (Northwood)
- Yaphett King (Cal State Fullerton)
- John Cooper (Wichita State)

Legend

- (C) Team captain
- (S) Suspended
- (I) Ineligible
- (W) Walk-on
- Injured
- Current redshirt

Roster
Last update: August 20, 2020

- Preseason: Tyson Jolly decided to opt out for the season.
- January 23, 2021: Tyson Jolly decided to rejoin the team for the remainder of the season.

== Schedule and results ==
The Mustangs began a series with Dayton in Dayton, Ohio beginning in the 2020–21 season.

=== COVID-19 impact ===
Due to the ongoing COVID-19 pandemic, the Mustangs' schedule was subject to change, including the cancellation or postponement of individual games, the cancellation of the entire season, or games played either with minimal fans or without fans in attendance and just essential personnel.

- Two previously scheduled games were postponed (vs. Arizona State and @ UNLV) were postponed to the 2021–22 season.
- The game @ South Florida scheduled for February 20 was moved to Dallas.

=== Schedule ===
| Date time, TV | Rank^{#} | Opponent^{#} | Result | Record | High points | High rebounds | High assists | Site (attendance) city, state |
Regular season
| November 25, 2020*; 7:00 p.m., ESPN+ | | Sam Houston State | W 97–67 | 1–0 | 33 – Davis | 7 – Hunt | 6 – Chargois | Moody Coliseum (1,530); University Park, TX |
| November 30, 2020*; 7:00 p.m., ESPN+ | | Texas A&M–Corpus Christi | W 91–54 | 2–0 | 19 – Hunt | 11 – Chargois | 11 – Davis | Moody Coliseum (1,501); University Park, TX |
| December 2, 2020*; 7:00 p.m., ESPN+ | | Houston Baptist | W 102–75 | 3–0 | 20 – tied | 11 – Hunt | 13 – Davis | Moody Coliseum (1,507); University Park, TX |
| December 5, 2020*; 1:00 p.m., ESPN+ | | at Dayton | W 66–64 | 4–0 | 21 – Davis | 6 – Davis | 3 – Davis | UD Arena (0); Dayton, OH |
| December 8, 2020* | | Vanderbilt; American/SEC Alliance | Postponed due to COVID-19 issues | | | | | Moody Coliseum; University Park, TX |
| December 16, 2020; 7:00 p.m., ESPN+ | | East Carolina | W 70–55 | 5–0 (1–0) | 13 – Davis | 5 – Chargois | 1 – tied | Moody Coliseum (1,564); University Park, TX |
| December 30, 2020; 1:00 p.m., ESPN+ | | at Temple | W 79–71 | 6–0 (2–0) | 17 – McNeill | 9 – Chargois | 5 – Davis | Liacouras Center; Philadelphia, PA |
| January 3, 2021; 6:00 p.m., ESPN2 | | No. 5 Houston; Rivalry | L 60–74 | 6–1 (2–1) | 23 – Davis | 12 – Hunt | 4 – Davis | Moody Coliseum; University Park, TX |
| January 6, 2021; 6:00 p.m., ESPNU | | Cincinnati | L 69–76 | 6–2 (2–2) | 14 – Davis | 10 – Hunt | 14 – Davis | Moody Coliseum (1,568); University Park, TX |
| January 11, 2021; 2:00 p.m., ESPN+ | | Temple | W 79–68 | 7–2 (3–2) | 20 – Davis | 11 – Hunt | 8 – Davis | Moody Coliseum (1,417); University Park, TX |
| January 20, 2021; 7:00 p.m., ESPN+ | | at Tulane | Postponed due to COVID-19 issues | | | | | Devlin Fieldhouse; New Orleans, LA |
| January 23, 2021; 1:00 p.m., ESPNU | | at UCF | W 78–65 | 8–2 (4–2) | 21 – Davis | 8 – Hunt | 9 – Davis | Addition Financial Arena (1,394); Orlando, FL |
| January 26, 2021; 6:00 p.m., ESPNU | | at Memphis; Previously scheduled for January 14 | L 72–76 | 8–3 (4–3) | 15 – Jolly | 6 – Jasey | 6 – Davis | FedExForum (2,157); Memphis, TN |
| January 28, 2021; 7:00 p.m., ESPN2 | | Memphis | W 67–65 | 9–3 (5–3) | 17 – Hunt | 6 – Jolly | 8 – Davis | Moody Coliseum (1,698); University Park, TX |
| January 31, 2021; 12:00 p.m., ESPN | | at No. 6 Houston rivalry | L 48–70 | 9–4 (5–4) | 11 – Davis | 8 – Hunt | 4 – Davis | Fertitta Center; Houston, TX |
| February 3, 2021; 8:00 p.m., ESPNU | | at Tulsa; Previously scheduled for February 13 | W 65–63 | 10–4 (6–4) | 22 – Davis | 12 – Hunt | 10 – Davis | Reynolds Center (100); Tulsa, OK |
| February 6, 2021; 11:00 a.m., ESPNU | | South Florida | Postponed due to COVID-19 issues | | | | | Moody Coliseum; University Park, TX |
| February 8, 2021; 4:00 p.m., ESPN2 | | at East Carolina | W 71–56 | 11–4 (7–4) | 25 – Davis | 9 – Hunt | 8 – Davis | Williams Arena (51); Greenville, NC |
| February 17, 2021; 7:00 p.m., ESPN+ | | Tulane | Postponed due to severe weather | | | | | Moody Coliseum; University Park, TX |
| February 20, 2021; 11:00 a.m., ESPNU | | South Florida | Postponed due to COVID-19 issues | | | | | Moody Coliseum; University Park, TX |
| February 23, 2021; 6:00 p.m., ESPNU | | UCF | Postponed due to COVID-19 issues | | | | | Moody Coliseum; University Park, TX |
| February 25, 2021; 6:00 p.m., ESPN2 | | at Wichita State; Previously scheduled for February 28 | Postponed due to COVID-19 issues | | | | | Charles Koch Arena; Wichita, KS |
| February 28, 2021; 7:00 p.m., ESPN+ | | Wichita State; Previously scheduled for January 17 | Postponed due to COVID-19 issues | | | | | Moody Coliseum; University Park, TX |
| March 4, 2021; 6:00 p.m., ESPNU | | at Cincinnati | Cancelled due to COVID-19 issues | | | | | Fifth Third Arena; Cincinnati, OH |
| March 7, 2021; 2:00 p.m., ESPN+ | | Tulsa | Cancelled due to COVID-19 issues | | | | | Moody Coliseum; University Park, TX |
AAC tournament
| March 12, 2021; 2:00 p.m., ESPN2 | (4) | vs. (5) Cincinnati; Quarterfinals | L 71–74 | 11–5 | 35 – Davis | 12 – Chargois | 4 – Davis | Dickies Arena (778); Fort Worth, TX |
NIT
| March 18, 2021; 8:00 p.m., ESPN | (3) | vs. (2) Boise State; First round – Memphis bracket | L 84–85 | 11–6 | 23 – Davis | 7 – Davis | 12 – Davis | Comerica Center (836); Frisco, TX |
*Non-conference game. ^{#}Rankings from AP poll. (#) Tournament seedings in parentheses. All times are in Central.

== Awards and honors ==
=== American Athletic Conference honors ===
==== All-AAC First Team ====
- Kendric Davis

==== All-AAC Third Team ====
- Feron Hunt
