= 2020–21 East Carolina Pirates men's basketball team =

American college basketball season

2020–21 East Carolina Pirates men's basketball
- Conference: American Athletic Conference
- Record: 8–11 (2–10 AAC)
- Head coach: Joe Dooley (3rd, 7th overall season)
- Assistant coaches: Steve Roccaforte; Antwon Jackson; George Wright-Easy
- Home arena: Williams Arena

2020–21 American Athletic Conference men's basketball standings
	Conf.				Overall
Team	W		L	PCT	W		L	PCT
Wichita State	11	–	2	.846	16	–	6	.727
No. 6 Houston †	14	–	3	.824	28	–	4	.875
Memphis	11	–	4	.733	20	–	8	.714
SMU	7	–	4	.636	11	–	6	.647
Cincinnati	8	–	6	.571	12	–	11	.522
UCF	8	–	10	.444	11	–	12	.478
Tulsa	7	–	9	.438	11	–	12	.478
South Florida	4	–	10	.286	9	–	13	.409
Temple	4	–	10	.286	5	–	11	.313
Tulane	4	–	12	.250	10	–	13	.435
East Carolina	2	–	10	.167	8	–	11	.421
† 2021 AAC tournament winner Rankings from AP poll

The 2020–21 East Carolina Pirates men's basketball team represented East Carolina University during the 2020–21 NCAA Division I men's basketball season. The Pirates were led by third year head coach, Joe Dooley, who previously coached the Pirates from 1995 to 1999, and played their home games at Williams Arena at Minges Coliseum as seventh-year members of the American Athletic Conference. They finished the season 8–11, 2–10 in AAC Play to finish in last place. They lost in the first round of the AAC tournament to UCF.

== Previous season ==
The Pirates finished the 2019–20 season 11–20, 5–13 in AAC play to finish in 11th place. They entered as the No. 11 seed in the AAC tournament, which was ultimately cancelled due to the coronavirus pandemic.

== Offseason ==
=== Departures ===
Name	Number	Pos.	Height	Weight	Year	Hometown	Reason for departure
Seth LeDay	3	F	6'7"	215	RS Senior	The Colony, TX	Left team (mid-season)
Logan Curtis	5	G	6'3"	195	Freshman	Baltimore, MD	Transferred to Delaware

=== Recruiting class of 2020 ===
College recruiting information
Name	Hometown	School	Height	Weight	Commit date
Derrick Quansah; C	Fayetteville, NC	Massanutten Military Academy (VA)	7 ft 0 in (2.13 m)	235 lb (107 kg)	May 3, 2019
Derrick Quansah; C	Recruit ratings: Scout: Rivals: 247Sports: (NR)				
Noah Farrakhan; PG	Newark, NJ	The Patrick School (NJ)	6 ft 1 in (1.85 m)	160 lb (73 kg)	Apr 21, 2020
Noah Farrakhan; PG	Recruit ratings: Scout: Rivals: 247Sports: ESPN: (80)				
Overall recruit ranking:
Note: In many cases, Scout, Rivals, 247Sports, On3, and ESPN may conflict in their listings of height and weight.; In these cases, the average was taken. ESPN grades are on a 100-point scale.; Sources: "2020 East Carolina Signees". Rivals.; "2020 East Carolina Signees". ESPN.; "2020 Team Ranking". Rivals.

=== 2021 recruiting class ===
College recruiting information (2021)
Name	Hometown	School	Height	Weight	Commit date
Tay Mosher; SF	The Colony, TX	The Colony High School	6 ft 7 in (2.01 m)	215 lb (98 kg)	07/13/20
Tay Mosher; SF	Recruit ratings: 247Sports: (NR)				
Dondre Watson; PF	Bronx, NY	Moravian Prep	6 ft 8 in (2.03 m)	215 lb (98 kg)	08/22/20
Dondre Watson; PF	Recruit ratings: (NR)				
Russell Felton; SG	Aiken, SC	Aiken High School	6 ft 4 in (1.93 m)	190 lb (86 kg)	08/24/20
Russell Felton; SG	Recruit ratings: (NR)				
Alexis Reyes; SG	Roxbury, MA	Cushing Academy	6 ft 6 in (1.98 m)	190 lb (86 kg)	09/22/20
Alexis Reyes; SG	Recruit ratings: Rivals: 247Sports: (NR)				
Overall recruit ranking:
Note: In many cases, Scout, Rivals, 247Sports, On3, and ESPN may conflict in their listings of height and weight.; In these cases, the average was taken. ESPN grades are on a 100-point scale.; Sources: "East Carolina 2021 Basketball Commitments". Rivals.; "2021 East Carolina Pirates Recruiting Class". ESPN.; "2021 Team Ranking". Rivals.; "2021 East Carolina Pirates Basketball 24/7 Sports Commits". 247Sports.

== Preseason ==
=== AAC preseason media poll ===
On October 28, The American released the preseason Poll and other preseason awards

Coaches Poll
Predicted finish	Team	Votes (1st place)
1	Houston	99 (2)
2	Memphis	90 (2)
3	SMU	80
4	Cincinnati	77
5	South Florida	61
6	Tulsa	50
7	Wichita State	44
8	UCF	37
9	East Carolina	34
10	Temple	18
11	Tulane	15

=== Preseason Awards ===
- All-AAC First Team - Jayden Gardner (*unanimous selection)

== Roster ==
2020–21 East Carolina Pirates men's basketball team
Players
Coaches

Pos.	#	Name	Height	Weight	Year	Previous school	Hometown
F/C	0	Derrick Quansah	7 ft 0 in (2.13 m)	230 lb (104 kg)	Fr	Massanutten Military Academy	Cape Coast, Ghana
F	1	Jayden Gardner	6 ft 7 in (2.01 m)	235 lb (107 kg)	Jr	Heritage	Wake Forest, NC
G	2	Tristen Newton	6 ft 5 in (1.96 m)	185 lb (84 kg)	So	Burges	El Paso, TX
G	3	Noah Farrakhan	6 ft 0 in (1.83 m)	165 lb (75 kg)	Fr	The Patrick School	Newark, NJ
G/F	4	Brandon Suggs	6 ft 6 in (1.98 m)	200 lb (91 kg)	So	Massanutten Military Academy	Powder Springs, GA
G	10	Tyrie Jackson	6 ft 2 in (1.88 m)	215 lb (98 kg)	RS Sr	NW Florida State College	Tifton, GA
G	11	J. J. Miles	6 ft 7 in (2.01 m)	220 lb (100 kg)	Sr	Cape Fear CC	Garysburg, NC
G	12	Tremont Robinson-White	6 ft 1 in (1.85 m)	190 lb (86 kg)	Jr	Garden City CC	Little Rock, AR
G	13	Ian Jones (W)	6 ft 3 in (1.91 m)	195 lb (88 kg)	Sr	Harnett Central	Lillington, NC
G	20	Bitumba Baruti	6 ft 7 in (2.01 m)	225 lb (102 kg)	RS Sr	Chipola College	Lubumbashi, DR Congo
C	21	Ludgy Debaut	7 ft 0 in (2.13 m)	245 lb (111 kg)	Sr	NW Florida State College	Les Abymes, Guadeloupe
G	24	Evan Umstead (W)	6 ft 0 in (1.83 m)	195 lb (88 kg)	Sr	Northside Christian Academy	Cary, NC
F	25	Samson Strickland (W)	6 ft 5 in (1.96 m)	220 lb (100 kg)	Jr	Washington Academy	Wilson, NC
F/C	32	Charles Coleman	7 ft 0 in (2.13 m)	255 lb (116 kg)	So	Dexter Southfield	Boston, MA
G	33	Miles James	6 ft 6 in (1.98 m)	215 lb (98 kg)	Jr	Palm Beach State College	Inglewood, CA
F/C	44	Edra Luster	7 ft 0 in (2.13 m)	230 lb (104 kg)	Sr	Tyler JC	Oakland, CA

Head coach

- Joe Dooley (George Washington)

Assistant coach(es)

- Steve Roccaforte (Lamar)
- Antwon Jackson (Pikeville)
- George Wright-Easy (Saint Francis (PA))

Legend

- (C) Team captain
- (S) Suspended
- (I) Ineligible
- (W) Walk-on
- Injured
- Current redshirt

Roster
Last update: July 29, 2020

== Schedule and results ==
=== COVID-19 impact ===
Due to the ongoing COVID-19 pandemic, the Pirates' schedule is subject to change, including the cancellation or postponement of individual games, the cancellation of the entire season, or games played either with minimal fans or without fans in attendance and just essential personnel.

- ECU opted out of the Gulf Coast Showcase due to COVID-19 concerns.
- The game vs. Belmont Abbey due to positive COVID-19 cases in the Belmont Abbey program.
- The games vs. Temple rescheduled for February 11 was moved to Philadelphia.
- The game vs. Wichita State scheduled for February 21 was moved to Wichita.

=== Schedule ===
Date time, TV	Rank^{#}	Opponent^{#}	Result	Record	High points	High rebounds	High assists	Site (attendance) city, state
Regular season
November 27, 2020*; 3:00 p.m.		at Charlotte; 49er Tip-Off Classic	W 66–57	1–0	15 – Gardner	6 – Newton	3 – Suggs	Halton Arena (1); Charlotte, NC
December 1, 2020*; 5:00 p.m.		North Carolina Wesleyan	W 91–62	2–0	27 – Gardner	8 – Newton	9 – Jones	Williams Arena; Greenville, NC
December 5, 2020*; 2:00 p.m., ESPN+		Radford	W 63–50	3–0	20 – Gardner	8 – Gardner	2 – Suggs	Williams Arena (78); Greenville, NC
December 7, 2020*; 6:00 p.m., ESPN+		UNC Wilmington	W 88–78 ^{OT}	4–0	22 – Miles	11 – Gardner	8 – Newton	Williams Arena (65); Greenville, NC
December 10, 2020*; 6:00 p.m., ESPN+		North Florida	W 73–67	5–0	20 – Gardner	12 – Gardner	8 – Newton	Williams Arena (50); Greenville, NC
December 16, 2020; 8:00 p.m., ESPN+		at SMU	L 55–70	5–1 (0–1)	13 – Gardner	5 – DeBut	4 – Robinson-White	Moody Coliseum (1,564); University Park, TX
December 19, 2020*; 1:00 p.m., ESPN+		James Madison	W 73–64	6–1	18 – Suggs	7 – Baruti	7 – Robinson-White	Williams Arena (73); Greenville, NC
December 22, 2020; 3:30 p.m., ESPN+		Tulane	W 68–58	7–1 (1–1)	21 – Gardner	10 – Gardner	4 – Miles	Williams Arena (65); Greenville, NC
December 30, 2020; 7:00 p.m., ESPN+		at Wichita State	Cancelled due to COVID-19 issues					Charles Koch Arena; Wichita, KS
January 2, 2021; 2:00 p.m., ESPN+		at Tulane	L 56–60	7–2 (1–2)	14 – Suggs	8 – Suggs	5 – Jackson	Devlin Fieldhouse (100); New Orleans, LA
January 9, 2021; 1:00 p.m., ESPN+		South Florida	L 63–69	7–3 (1–3)	29 – Robinson-White	10 – Gardner	3 – Miles	Williams Arena (67); Greenville, NC
January 13, 2021; 5:00 p.m., ESPN+		at Cincinnati	Postponed due to COVID-19 issues					Fifth Third Arena; Cincinnati, OH
January 20, 2021; 7:00 p.m., ESPN+		at South Florida	Postponed due to COVID-19 issues					Yuengling Center; Tampa, FL
January 24, 2021; 4:00 p.m., ESPN2		Memphis	L 53–80	7–4 (1–4)	15 – Robinson-White	11 – Gardner	3 – Tied	Williams Arena (55); Greenville, NC
January 27, 2021; 7:00 p.m., ESPN+		at UCF	L 64–71	7–5 (1–5)	23 – Gardner	10 – Gardner	4 – Newton	Addition Financial Arena (1,407); Orlando, FL
January 30, 2021; 12:00 p.m., ESPN+		Tulsa	L 68–77	7–6 (1–6)	26 – Gardner	8 – Gardner	6 – Miles	Williams Arena (82); Greenville, NC
February 3, 2021; 6:00 p.m., ESPN+		No. 5 Houston	W 82–73	8–6 (2–6)	21 – Gardner	15 – Gardner	6 – Newton	Williams Arena (78); Greenville, NC
February 6, 2021; 2:00 p.m., ESPN		at Memphis	L 59–66	8–7 (2–7)	23 – Gardner	9 – Gardner	4 – Tied	FedEx Forum (2,371); Memphis, TN
February 8, 2021; 5:00 p.m., ESPN2		SMU	L 56–71	8–8 (2–8)	23 – Gardner	9 – Gardner	3 – Robinson-White	Williams Arena (51); Greenville, NC
February 11, 2021; 12:00 p.m., ESPN+		at Temple; Previously scheduled for Jan. 16	Postponed due to COVID-19 issues					Liacouras Center; Philadelphia, PA
February 13, 2021; 12:00 p.m., ESPN+		Temple	Postponed due to COVID-19 issues					Williams Arena; Greenville, NC
February 17, 2021; ESPN+		at Houston	Postponed due to COVID-19 issues					Fertitta Center; Houston, TX
February 21, 2021; 12:00 p.m., ESPNU		at Wichita State	Postponed due to COVID-19 issues					Charles Koch Arena; Wichita, KS
February 27, 2021; 7:00 p.m., ESPN+		at Tulsa	Postponed due to COVID-19 issues					Reynolds Center; Tulsa, OK
March 4, 2021; 9:00 p.m., ESPNU		UCF	L 60–64	8–9 (2–9)	18 – Tied	7 – Gardner	5 – Newton	Williams Arena (424); Greenville, NC
March 7, 2021; 1:00 p.m., ESPN+		Cincinnati	L 69–82	8–10 (2–10)	23 – Gardner	8 – Suggs	7 – Robinson-White	Williams Arena (439); Greenville, NC
AAC tournament
March 11, 2021; 7:00 p.m., ESPN2	(11)	vs. (6) UCF; First Round	L 62–72	8–11	17 – Gardner	9 – Gardner	6 – Newton	Dickies Arena; Fort Worth, TX
*Non-conference game. ^{#}Rankings from AP Poll. (#) Tournament seedings in parentheses. All times are in Eastern Time.

== Awards and honors ==
=== American Athletic Conference honors ===
==== All-AAC First Team ====
- Jayden Gardner
