= 2020–21 UCF Knights men's basketball team =

University of Central Florida NCAA team

2020–21 UCF Knights men's basketball
- Conference: American Athletic Conference
- Record: 11–12 (8–10 AAC)
- Head coach: Johnny Dawkins (5th season)
- Assistant coaches: Kevin Norris (5th season); Vince Taylor (4th season); Robbie Laing (5th season)
- Home arena: Addition Financial Arena

2020–21 American Athletic Conference men's basketball standings
	Conf.				Overall
Team	W		L	PCT	W		L	PCT
Wichita State	11	–	2	.846	16	–	6	.727
No. 6 Houston †	14	–	3	.824	28	–	4	.875
Memphis	11	–	4	.733	20	–	8	.714
SMU	7	–	4	.636	11	–	6	.647
Cincinnati	8	–	6	.571	12	–	11	.522
UCF	8	–	10	.444	11	–	12	.478
Tulsa	7	–	9	.438	11	–	12	.478
South Florida	4	–	10	.286	9	–	13	.409
Temple	4	–	10	.286	5	–	11	.313
Tulane	4	–	12	.250	10	–	13	.435
East Carolina	2	–	10	.167	8	–	11	.421
† 2021 AAC tournament winner Rankings from AP poll

The 2020–21 UCF Knights men's basketball team represented the University of Central Florida during the 2020–21 NCAA Division I men's basketball season. The Knights were members of the American Athletic Conference. The Knights, in the program's 52nd season of basketball, were led by fifth-year head coach Johnny Dawkins and played their home games at the Addition Financial Arena on the university's main campus in Orlando, Florida. They finished the season 11–12, 8–10 in AAC Play to finish in 6th place. They defeated East Carolina in the first round of the AAC tournament before losing in the quarterfinals to Memphis.

== Previous season ==
The Knights finished the 2019–20 season 16–14 overall and 7–11 in AAC play to finish in eighth place. They entered as the No. 8 seed in the AAC tournament, which was ultimately cancelled due to the coronavirus pandemic.

== Offseason ==
=== Departures ===
Name	Number	Pos.	Height	Weight	Year	Hometown	Reason for departure
Yuat Alok	0	F	6'11"	225	Junior	Auckland, New Zealand	Transferred to Southern Utah (mid-season)
Matt Milon	2	G	6'5"	210	Graduate student	Oviedo, FL	Completed college eligibility (Note: Milon and Ingram were both graduate transfers in the 2019–20 season, with Milon having graduated from William & Mary and Ingram from Alabama.)
Ceasar DeJesus	4	G	6'2"	190	RS Junior	Jersey City, NJ	Play professionally
Dazon Ingram	12	G	6'6"	205	Graduate student	Theodore, AL	Completed college eligibility
Frank Bertz	20	G	6'5"	180	Senior	Hesperia, CA	Graduated
Collin Smith	35	F	6'11"	240	Redshirt junior	Jacksonville, FL	Left the team due to health issues

=== Incoming transfers ===
Name	Pos.	Height	Weight	Year	Hometown	Notes
Darius Perry	G	6'2"	185	Senior	Marietta, GA	Transferred from Louisville after graduating. Had one year of eligibility beginning immediately.
C. J. Walker	F	6'8"	205	Sophomore	Sanford, FA	Transferred from Oregon. Walker was granted a waiver for immediate eligibility. Had three years of remaining eligibility.

=== 2020 recruiting class ===
College recruiting
Name	Hometown	School	Height	Weight	Commit date
Jamille Reynolds; PF	Saint Petersburg, FL	Lakewood Senior High School	6 ft 9 in (2.06 m)	230 lb (100 kg)	Aug 18, 2019
Jamille Reynolds; PF	Recruit ratings: Scout: Rivals: (80)				
Isaiah Adams; SF	Jacksonville, FL	Paxon School for Advanced Studies	6 ft 5 in (1.96 m)	170 lb (77 kg)	Sep 2, 2019
Isaiah Adams; SF	Recruit ratings: Scout: Rivals: (80)				
Overall recruit ranking:
Note: In many cases, Scout, Rivals, 247Sports, On3, and ESPN may conflict in their listings of height and weight.; In these cases, the average was taken. ESPN grades are on a 100-point scale.; Sources: "2020 Team Ranking". Rivals.

== Preseason ==
=== AAC preseason media poll ===
On October 28, The American released the preseason poll and other preseason awards

Coaches Poll
Predicted finish	Team	Votes (1st place)
1	Houston	99 (2)
2	Memphis	90 (2)
3	SMU	80
4	Cincinnati	77
5	South Florida	61
6	Tulsa	50
7	Wichita State	44
8	UCF	37
9	East Carolina	34
10	Temple	18
11	Tulane	15

== Roster ==
2020–21 UCF Knights men's basketball team
Players
Coaches

Pos.	#	Name	Height	Weight	Year	Previous school	Hometown
G	0	Josh Kaplan (W)	6 ft 0 in (1.83 m)	160 lb (73 kg)	Jr	John F. Kennedy High School	Merrick, New York
G	1	Tony Johnson Jr.	6 ft 3 in (1.91 m)	185 lb (84 kg)	So	The Skill Factory	Eufaula, Alabama
G	2	Darius Perry	6 ft 2 in (1.88 m)	185 lb (84 kg)	Sr	Louisville	Marietta, Georgia
F	3	Isaiah Adams	6 ft 6 in (1.98 m)	210 lb (95 kg)	Fr	Paxon School for Advanced Studies	Jacksonville, Florida
F	4	Jamille Reynolds	6 ft 10 in (2.08 m)	285 lb (129 kg)	Fr	Lakewood Senior High School	St. Petersburg, Florida
C	5	Avery Diggs	6 ft 11 in (2.11 m)	245 lb (111 kg)	Sr	SW Mississippi CC	Brandon, Florida
G	10	Levy Renaud (W)	6 ft 2 in (1.88 m)	185 lb (84 kg)	Jr	NSU University School	Fort Lauderdale, Florida
G	11	Xavier Grant (W)	6 ft 3 in (1.91 m)	185 lb (84 kg)	Jr	American Heritage School	Fort Lauderdale, Florida
G	13	Brandon Mahan	6 ft 5 in (1.96 m)	205 lb (93 kg)	Sr	Texas A&M	Birmingham, Alabama
G	15	Isaac Ward	6 ft 0 in (1.83 m)	185 lb (84 kg)	Fr	Tampa Preparatory School	Tampa, Florida
F	20	Sean Mobley	6 ft 8 in (2.03 m)	235 lb (107 kg)	RS Jr	VCU	Orlando, Florida
F	21	C. J. Walker	6 ft 8 in (2.03 m)	205 lb (93 kg)	So	Oregon	Sanford, Florida
G	22	Darin Green Jr.	6 ft 4 in (1.93 m)	185 lb (84 kg)	So	Wharton High School	Charlotte, North Carolina
G	24	Dre Fuller Jr.	6 ft 5 in (1.96 m)	215 lb (98 kg)	RS So	Admiral Farragut Academy	Fayetteville, North Carolina
F	25	Ryan Anders (W)	6 ft 6 in (1.98 m)	235 lb (107 kg)	Jr	Wharton High School	Tampa, Florida
C	33	Moses Bol	7 ft 1 in (2.16 m)	230 lb (104 kg)	RS Jr	Colby CC	Wau, South Sudan

Head coach

- Johnny Dawkins (Duke)

Assistant coach(es)

- Kevin Norris (Miami (FL))
- Vince Taylor (Duke)
- Robbie Laing (Troy)

Legend

- (C) Team captain
- (S) Suspended
- (I) Ineligible
- (W) Walk-on
- Injured
- Current redshirt

Roster
Last update: July 27, 2020

== Schedule and results ==
UCF started a series with Michigan beginning this season in Ann Arbor, Michigan.

=== COVID-19 impact ===
Due to the ongoing COVID-19 pandemic, the Knights' schedule was subject to change, including the cancellation or postponement of individual games, the cancellation of the entire season, or games played either with minimal fans or without fans in attendance and just essential personnel.

- The game vs. Oklahoma scheduled for November 28 was cancelled due to COVID-19 issues.
- The game @ Tulsa rescheduled for March 2 was moved to Orlando.
- The game vs. Tulsa originally scheduled for February 6 was moved to Tulsa.

=== Schedule ===
Date time, TV	Rank^{#}	Opponent^{#}	Result	Record	High points	High rebounds	High assists	Site (attendance) city, state
Regular season
November 30, 2020*; 7:00 p.m., ESPN+		Auburn	W 63–55	1–0	13 – Fuller Jr.	8 – Walker	5 – Fuller Jr.	Addition Financial Arena (1,944); Orlando, FL
December 6, 2020*; 4:00 p.m., BTN		at Michigan	L 58–80	1–1	21 – Mahan	5 – Mahan	3 – Fuller Jr.	Crisler Center; Ann Arbor, MI
December 19, 2020*; 9:00 p.m., ACCN		at No. 15 Florida State	W 86–74	2–1	32 – Mahan	8 – Adams	4 – Fuller Jr.	Donald L. Tucker Center (2,576); Tallahassee, FL
December 22, 2020; 4:00 p.m., ESPN+		Cincinnati	W 75–70	3–1 (1–0)	25 – Mahan	10 – Mahan	3 – Fuller Jr.	Addition Financial Arena; Orlando, FL
December 26, 2020; 1:00 p.m., ABC		No. 6 Houston; Previously scheduled for Dec. 15	L 54–63	3–2 (1–1)	13 – Tied	10 – Fuller Jr.	2 – Tied	Addition Financial Arena (1,476); Orlando, FL
January 2, 2021; 7:00 p.m., ESPN+		at South Florida; War on I-4	L 61–68	3–3 (1–2)	23 – Perry	8 – Fuller Jr.	6 – Perry	Yuengling Center (1,016); Tampa, FL
January 14, 2021; 12:00 p.m., ESPN+		at Temple	L 55–62	3–4 (1–3)	17 – Green Jr.	10 – Fuller Jr.	7 – Mahan	Liacouras Center; Philadelphia, PA
January 17, 2021; 2:00 p.m., ESPNU		at No. 11 Houston	L 58–75	3–5 (1–4)	14 – Reynolds	10 – Adams	2 – Tied	Fertitta Center (1,859); Houston, TX
January 23, 2021; 2:00 p.m., ESPNU		SMU	L 65–78	3–6 (1–5)	14 – Perry	5 – Tied	7 – Perry	Addition Financial Arena (1,394); Orlando, FL
January 27, 2021; 7:00 p.m., ESPN+		East Carolina	W 71–64	4–6 (2–5)	18 – Green Jr.	6 – Tied	3 – Tied	Addition Financial Arena (1,407); Orlando, FL
January 30, 2021; 4:00 p.m., ESPNU		at Wichita State	L 88–93 ^{OT}	4–7 (2–6)	17 – Tied	8 – Reynolds	4 – Adams	Charles Koch Arena (2,100); Wichita, KS
February 1, 2021; 8:00 p.m., ESPN+		at Memphis; Previously scheduled for Jan. 5	L 69–96	4–8 (2–7)	15 – Mahan	6 – Mahan	4 – Perry	FedEx Forum (2,106); Memphis, TN
February 3, 2021; 8:00 p.m., ESPN+		at Memphis	L 61–75	4–9 (2–8)	18 – Perry	7 – Tied	5 – Mahan	FedEx Forum (2,284); Memphis, TN
February 6, 2021; 6:00 p.m., ESPN2		at Tulsa	W 65–58	5–9 (3–8)	18 – Perry	4 – Fuller Jr.	3 – Mobley	Reynolds Center; Tulsa, OK
February 10, 2021; 7:00 p.m., ESPN+		Wichita State	L 60–61	5–10 (3–9)	27 – Perry	6 – Fuller Jr.	2 – Tied	Addition Financial Arena (1,385); Orlando, FL
February 12, 2021; 7:00 pm, ESPN+		Tulane; Previously scheduled for Dec. 30	L 49–53	6–10 (4–9)	18 – Green Jr.	8 – Adams	5 – Perry	Addition Financial Arena (1,420); Orlando, FL
February 14, 2021; 1:00 p.m., ESPNU		at Cincinnati	L 68–69	6–11 (4–10)	21 – Mahan	10 – Walker	4 – Perry	Fifth Third Arena (300); Cincinnati, OH
February 17, 2021; 7:00 p.m., ESPNU		South Florida; War on I-4	W 81–65	7–11 (5–10)	18 – Walker	9 – Walker	4 – Perry	Addition Financial Arena (1,764); Orlando, FL
February 20, 2021; 2:00 p.m., ESPNU		at Tulane	W 84–81	8–11 (6–10)	26 – Adams	6 – Walker	7 – Perry	Devlin Fieldhouse; New Orleans, LA
February 23, 2021; 7:00 p.m., ESPNU		at SMU	Postponed due to COVID-19 issues					Moody Coliseum; University Park, TX
February 27, 2021; 4:00 p.m., ESPNU		Temple	Cancelled due to COVID-19 issues					Addition Financial Arena; Orlando, FL
March 2, 2021; 7:00 pm, ESPNU		Tulsa; Previously scheduled for Jan. 9	W 73–69	9–11 (7–10)	19 – Adams	5 – Tied	3 – Tied	Addition Financial Arena (1,309); Orlando, FL
March 4, 2021; 9:00 p.m., ESPNU		at East Carolina	W 64–60	10–11 (8–10)	15 – Adams	11 – Perry	5 – Perry	Williams Arena (424); Greenville, NC
American Athletic Conference tournament
March 11, 2021; 7:00 p.m., ESPN2	(6)	vs. (11) East Carolina; First Round	W 72–62	11–11	15 – Perry	7 – Fuller Jr.	4 – Fuller Jr.	Dickies Arena; Fort Worth, TX
March 12, 2021; 10:00 p.m., ESPNU	(6)	vs. (3) Memphis; Quarterfinals	L 62–70	11–12	15 – Perry	11 – Fuller Jr.	5 – Perry	Dickies Arena (826); Fort Worth, TX
*Non-conference game. ^{#}Rankings from AP Poll. (#) Tournament seedings in parentheses. All times are in Eastern Time.

== Awards and honors ==
=== American Athletic Conference honors ===
==== All-AAC Third Team ====
- Brandon Mahan
- Darius Perry

==== All-AAC Freshman Team ====
- Isaiah Adams
