= 2020–21 Temple Owls men's basketball team =

Temple University NCAA team

2020–21 Temple Owls men's basketball
- Conference: American Athletic Conference
- Record: 5–11 (4–10 AAC)
- Head coach: Aaron McKie (2nd season)
- Associate head coach: Monté Ross
- Assistant coaches: Chris Clark; Jimmy Fenerty
- Home arena: Liacouras Center

2020–21 American Athletic Conference men's basketball standings
	Conf.				Overall
Team	W		L	PCT	W		L	PCT
Wichita State	11	–	2	.846	16	–	6	.727
No. 6 Houston †	14	–	3	.824	28	–	4	.875
Memphis	11	–	4	.733	20	–	8	.714
SMU	7	–	4	.636	11	–	6	.647
Cincinnati	8	–	6	.571	12	–	11	.522
UCF	8	–	10	.444	11	–	12	.478
Tulsa	7	–	9	.438	11	–	12	.478
South Florida	4	–	10	.286	9	–	13	.409
Temple	4	–	10	.286	5	–	11	.313
Tulane	4	–	12	.250	10	–	13	.435
East Carolina	2	–	10	.167	8	–	11	.421
† 2021 AAC tournament winner Rankings from AP poll

The 2020–21 Temple Owls men's basketball team represented Temple University during the 2020–21 NCAA Division I men's basketball season. The Owls, led by second-year head coach Aaron McKie, play their home games at the Liacouras Center in Philadelphia as a member of the American Athletic Conference. They finished the season 5–11 and 4–10 in AAC Play, and finished in 9th place. They lost in the first round of the AAC tournament to South Florida.

== Previous season ==
The Owls finished the 2019–20 season 14–17, 6–12 in AAC play to finish in tenth place. They entered as the No. 10 seed in the AAC tournament, which was ultimately cancelled due to the coronavirus pandemic.

== Offseason ==
=== Departures ===
Name	Number	Pos.	Height	Weight	Year	Hometown	Reason for departure
Alani Moore	0	G	5'10"	170	Senior	Washington, D.C.	Graduated
Quinton Rose	1	G	6'8"	195	Senior	Rochester, New York	Graduated
Monty Scott	2	G	6'5"	185	RS junior	Union, New Jersey	Graduated, transferred to Portland State
Josh Pierre-Louis	3	G	6'3"	180	Freshman	Plainfield, New Jersey	Transferred to UC Santa Barbara
Nate Pierre-Louis	15	G	6'4"	170	Junior	Plainfield, New Jersey	Play professionally
Justyn Hamilton	21	F	6'10"	190	Junior	Charlotte, North Carolina	Transferred to Kent State
Anto Keshgegian	32	G	6'3"	185	Senior	Media, Pennsylvania	Walk-on; graduated
Damion Moore	44	C	6'11"	255	Senior	Vaughn, Mississippi	Graduated

=== Incoming transfers ===
Name	Pos.	Height	Weight	Year	Hometown	Previous school
Khalif Battle	G	6'5"	175	Sophomore	Edison, New Jersey	Transferred from Butler. Battle was granted a waiver for immediate eligibility. Had three years of remaining eligibility.
Sage Tolbert	F	6'8"	210	Junior	Richmond, Texas	Transferred from Southeast Missouri State. Under NCAA transfer rules, Tolbert had to sit out the 2020–21 season. Had two years of remaining eligibility.
Brendan Barry	G	6'2"	180	Graduate student	Fair Haven, New Jersey	Transferred from Dartmouth after graduating. Had one year of eligibility beginning immediately.
Colin Daly	G	6'4"	185	Senior	Havertown, Pennsylvania	Walk-on; transferred from West Chester.

=== 2020 recruiting class ===
College recruiting
Name	Hometown	School	Height	Weight	Commit date
Jahlil White #64 SF	Wildwood, New Jersey	Wildwood Catholic High School	6 ft 7 in (2.01 m)	180 lb (82 kg)	Jul 19, 2019
Jahlil White #64 SF	Recruit ratings: Scout: Rivals: 247Sports: (76)				
Quincy Ademokoya #75 SF	Dacula, Georgia	Dacula High School	6 ft 5 in (1.96 m)	180 lb (82 kg)	Oct 12, 2019
Quincy Ademokoya #75 SF	Recruit ratings: Scout: Rivals: 247Sports: (NR)				
Nick Jourdain; PF	Wayne, New Jersey	Covenant College Prep	6 ft 8 in (2.03 m)	210 lb (95 kg)	Mar 18, 2020
Nick Jourdain; PF	Recruit ratings: Scout: Rivals: 247Sports: (NR)				
Jeremiah Williams #77 SF	Chicago, Illinois	Simeon Career Academy	6 ft 5 in (1.96 m)	185 lb (84 kg)	Apr 22, 2020
Jeremiah Williams #77 SF	Recruit ratings: Scout: Rivals: 247Sports: (NR)				
Overall recruit ranking: 247Sports: 93
Note: In many cases, Scout, Rivals, 247Sports, On3, and ESPN may conflict in their listings of height and weight.; In these cases, the average was taken. ESPN grades are on a 100-point scale.; Sources: "2020 Team Ranking". Rivals.

=== 2021 recruiting class ===
College recruiting (2021)
Name	Hometown	School	Height	Weight	Commit date
Brandon Sanders; C	Miami, FL	South Miami High School	6 ft 10 in (2.08 m)	205 lb (93 kg)	Jul 13, 2020
Brandon Sanders; C	Recruit ratings: Rivals: 247Sports: (NR)				
Hysier Miller; PG	Philadelphia, PA	Neumann Goretti High School	6 ft 1 in (1.85 m)	170 lb (77 kg)	Aug 7, 2020
Hysier Miller; PG	Recruit ratings: Rivals: 247Sports: (78)				
Zach Hicks; PF	Cherry Hill, NJ	Camden Catholic High School	6 ft 7 in (2.01 m)	185 lb (84 kg)	Sep 4, 2020
Zach Hicks; PF	Recruit ratings: Rivals: 247Sports: (NR)				
Overall recruit ranking: 247Sports: 80
Note: In many cases, Scout, Rivals, 247Sports, On3, and ESPN may conflict in their listings of height and weight.; In these cases, the average was taken. ESPN grades are on a 100-point scale.; Sources: "2021 Team Ranking". Rivals.

== Preseason ==
=== AAC preseason media poll ===
On October 28, the American released the preseason poll and other preseason awards.

Coaches Poll
Predicted finish	Team	Votes (1st place)
1	Houston	99 (2)
2	Memphis	90 (2)
3	SMU	80
4	Cincinnati	77
5	South Florida	61
6	Tulsa	50
7	Wichita State	44
8	UCF	37
9	East Carolina	34
10	Temple	18
11	Tulane	15

== Roster ==
2020–21 Temple Owls men's basketball team
Players
Coaches

Pos.	#	Name	Height	Weight	Year	Previous school	Hometown
G	0	Khalif Battle	6 ft 5 in (1.96 m)	175 lb (79 kg)	So	Trenton Catholic Academy; Butler	Edison, New Jersey
G	1	Damian Dunn	6 ft 5 in (1.96 m)	195 lb (88 kg)	RS Fr	Meadowcreek High School	Kinston, North Carolina
F	2	Jahlil White	6 ft 7 in (2.01 m)	205 lb (93 kg)	Fr	Wildwood Catholic High School	Wildwood, New Jersey
F	3	Sage Tolbert III (redshirt)	6 ft 8 in (2.03 m)	210 lb (95 kg)	Jr	Combine Academy; Southeast Missouri State	New Orleans, Louisiana
F	4	J. P. Moorman	6 ft 7 in (2.01 m)	210 lb (95 kg)	Sr	Greensboro Day School	Greensboro, North Carolina
F	10	Jake Forrester	6 ft 9 in (2.06 m)	225 lb (102 kg)	Jr	Westtown School; Indiana	Harrisburg, Pennsylvania
F	11	Nick Jourdain	6 ft 8 in (2.03 m)	205 lb (93 kg)	Fr	Covenant College Prep	Wayne, New Jersey
G	13	Tai Strickland	6 ft 2 in (1.88 m)	180 lb (82 kg)	RS So	St. Petersburg High School; Wisconsin	Tampa, Florida
F	14	Arashma Parks	6 ft 9 in (2.06 m)	230 lb (104 kg)	RS So	The Phelps School	North Royalton, Ohio
G	15	Brendan Barry	6 ft 2 in (1.88 m)	180 lb (82 kg)	GS	Rumson-Fair High School; Dartmouth	Fair Haven, New Jersey
G	21	Colin Daly (W)	6 ft 4 in (1.93 m)	185 lb (84 kg)	Sr	Archbishop Carroll High School; West Chester	Havertown, Pennsylvania
F	22	De'Vondre Perry	6 ft 7 in (2.01 m)	220 lb (100 kg)	Sr	Baltimore Polytechnic	Baltimore, Maryland
G	23	Quincy Ademokoya	6 ft 6 in (1.98 m)	185 lb (84 kg)	Fr	Dacula High School	Dacula, Georgia
F	24	Tim Waddington (W)	6 ft 5 in (1.96 m)	195 lb (88 kg)	RS Sr	Central Bucks High School South	Warrington, Pennsylvania
G	25	Jeremiah Williams	6 ft 5 in (1.96 m)	185 lb (84 kg)	Fr	Simeon Career Academy	Chicago, Illinois

Head coach

- Aaron McKie (Temple)

Assistant coach(es)

- Monté Ross (Winston Salem State)
- Chris Clark (Temple)
- Shawn Trice (Penn)

Legend

- (C) Team captain
- (S) Suspended
- (I) Ineligible
- (W) Walk-on
- Injured
- Current redshirt

Roster

== Schedule and results ==
=== COVID-19 impact ===
Due to the ongoing COVID-19 pandemic, the Owls' schedule was subject to change, including the cancellation or postponement of individual games, the cancellation of the entire season, or games played either with minimal fans or without fans in attendance and just essential personnel.

- On November 26, Temple paused activities following positive COVID-19 tests within their program for 14 days. This resulted in the cancellation of participation in the Hall of Fame Tip Off (alongside Rhode Island and Virginia Tech) as well as games against La Salle, Villanova, and Saint Joseph's.
- The games at Cincinnati, scheduled for February 4, were moved to Philadelphia.
- The game at East Carolina, rescheduled for February 11, was moved to Philadelphia.
- The game vs. Cincinnati, rescheduled for February 12, was moved to Cincinnati.
- The game at South Florida, rescheduled to February 21, was moved to Philadelphia.
- The game vs. South Florida, scheduled for February 24, was moved to Tampa.

=== Schedule ===
Date time, TV	Rank^{#}	Opponent^{#}	Result	Record	High points	High rebounds	High assists	Site (attendance) city, state
Regular season
December 3, 2020*; 7:00 p.m.		at No. 12 Villanova; Philadelphia Big 5	Cancelled due to COVID-19 issues					Finneran Pavilion; Villanova, PA
December 12, 2020*; 3:00 p.m., NBCSN		at Saint Joseph's; Philadelphia Big 5/Rivalry	Postponed due to COVID-19 issues					Hagan Arena; Philadelphia, PA
December 19, 2020*; 4:30 p.m., ESPN+		NJIT; Previously scheduled for Nov. 25	W 72–60	1–0	18 – Dunn	14 – Perry	5 – Dunn	Liacouras Center; Philadelphia, PA
December 22, 2020; 8:00 p.m., ESPN+		at No. 6 Houston	L 50–76	1–1 (0–1)	12 – Moorman II	8 – Perry	4 – Williams	Fertitta Center (1,859); Houston, TX
December 30, 2020; 2:00 p.m., ESPN+		SMU	L 71–79	1–2 (0–2)	17 – Barry	12 – Forrester	3 – Moorman II	Liacouras Center; Philadelphia, PA
January 2, 2021; 12:00 p.m., ESPNU		Memphis	Postponed due to COVID-19 issues					Liacouras Center; Philadelphia, PA
January 11, 2021; 3:00 p.m., ESPN+		at SMU	L 68–79	1–3 (0–3)	17 – Dunn	8 – Moorman II	5 – Dunn	Moody Coliseum (1,417); University Park, TX
January 14, 2021; 12:00 p.m., ESPN+		UCF	W 62–55	2–3 (1–3)	20 – Dunn	13 – Moorman II	4 – Williams	Liacouras Center; Philadelphia, PA
January 16, 2021; 1:00 p.m., ESPN+		at Tulane	W 65-57	3-3 (2-3)	18 – Dunn	10 – Forrester	5 – Williams	Devlin Fieldhouse (100); New Orleans, LA
January 23, 2021; 12:00 p.m., CBS		No. 8 Houston; Previously scheduled for Feb. 8	L 51–68	3–4 (2–4)	15 – Forrester	8 – Forrester	6 – Williams	Liacouras Center; Philadelphia, PA
January 26, 2021; 1:00 p.m., ESPN+		Tulsa; Previously scheduled for Mar. 2	W 76–67	4–4 (3–4)	22 – Battle	11 – Battle	8 – Williams	Liacouras Center; Philadelphia, PA
January 31, 2021; 12:00 p.m., ESPN+		Tulane	L 64–81	4–5 (3–5)	15 – Forrester	11 – Williams	9 – Williams	Liacouras Center; Philadelphia, PA
February 4, 2021; 7:00 p.m., ESPN2		Cincinnati	L 60–63	4–6 (3–6)	16 – Dunn	7 – Moorman II	3 – Tied	Liacouras Center; Philadelphia, PA
February 7, 2021; 2:00 p.m., ESPNU		at Wichita State	L 67–70	4–7 (3–7)	22 – Dunn	7 – Dunn	3 – Tied	Charles Koch Arena (2,625); Wichita, KS
February 11, 2021; 12:00 p.m., ESPN+		East Carolina; Previously scheduled for Jan. 16	Postponed due to COVID-19 issues					Liacouras Center; Philadelphia, PA
February 12, 2021; 7:00 p.m., ESPN+		Cincinnati; Previously scheduled for Jan. 20	L 69–71	4–8 (3–8)	17 – Barry	8 – Perry	4 – Williams	Liacouras Center (300); Philadelphia, PA
February 13, 2021; 12:00 p.m., ESPN+		at East Carolina	Postponed due to COVID-19 issues					Williams Arena; Greenville, NC
February 16, 2021; 7:00 p.m., ESPNU		at Tulsa	L 66–72	4–9 (3–9)	21 – Battle	7 – Battle	4 – Williams	Reynolds Center (100); Tulsa, OK
February 21, 2021; 3:00 p.m., ESPN+		at Memphis	Postponed due to COVID-19 issues					FedEx Forum; Memphis, TN
February 21, 2021; 2:00 p.m., ESPN+		South Florida; Previously scheduled for Jan. 27	L 76–83	4–10 (3–10)	32 – Battle	10 – Battle	5 – Battle	Liacouras Center; Philadelphia, PA
February 24, 2021; 7:00 p.m., ESPNU		at South Florida	W 65–47	5–10 (4–10)	22 – Battle	6 – Tied	4 – Battle	Yuengling Center (471); Tampa, FL
February 27, 2021; 4:00 p.m., ESPNU		at UCF	Cancelled due to COVID-19 issues					Addition Financial Arena; Orlando, FL
March 6, 2021; 6:00 p.m., ESPN2		Wichita State	Cancelled due to COVID-19 issues					Liacouras Center; Philadelphia, PA
AAC tournament
March 11, 2021; Noon, ESPNU	(9)	vs. (8) South Florida; First Round	L 71–73	5–11	18 – Battle	11 – Forrester	5 – Battle	Dickies Arena; Fort Worth, TX
*Non-conference game. ^{#}Rankings from AP Poll. (#) Tournament seedings in parentheses. All times are in Eastern Time.

== Awards and honors ==
=== American Athletic Conference honors ===
==== All-AAC Awards ====
- Sportsmanship Award: J.P. Moorman II

==== All-AAC Third Team ====
- Khalif Battle

==== All-AAC Freshman Team ====
- Damian Dunn
