= Archbishop Edward A. McCarthy High School =

Private Catholic school in Florida, United States

Location
- 5451 South Flamingo Road; Southwest Ranches, Florida 33330; United States; 26.052328°N 80.313420°W

Information
- Type: Private, Catholic
- Motto: Latin: Manere in Dilectione Christi (To abide in the love of Christ.)
- Religious affiliation: Roman Catholic
- Established: 1998
- Oversight: Archdiocese of Miami
- President: Richard P. Jean
- Principal: Kevin Molina
- Asst. Principal: Mark Saxton
- Chaplain: Jean Jadotte
- Staff: 100
- Grades: 9-12
- Gender: Coeducational
- Campus size: 61 acres (250,000 m^{2})
- Colors: Teal, silver, and black
- Song: You’ll Never Walk Alone
- Team name: Mavericks
- Rival: Monsignor Edward Pace High School St. Thomas Aquinas High School (Florida)
- Accreditation: Southern Association of Colleges and Schools
- Newspaper: AMP- Archbishop McCarthy Press
- Tuition: $11,190 - $11,610
- Athletic Director: Karen Frank
- Website: www.mccarthyhigh.org

Archbishop Edward A. McCarthy High School (abbreviated AMHS) was opened in 1998 in Southwest Ranches, Florida, United States. Sponsored by the Roman Catholic Archdiocese of Miami, it is accredited through the Southern Association of Colleges and Schools. Named after the second Archbishop of Miami, Edward A. McCarthy, the school's mascot is the Maverick. The founding principal of the school was Richard Perhla. Students wear a uniform consisting of a solid white or light blue shirt, AMHS khaki slacks, a black leather belt, black shoes, and a student ID with AMHS lanyard. As of the 2019–2020 school year, there are 1,700 students enrolled in grades nine through twelve.

== Achievements ==
Since 2005, AMHS has been named one of the Top 50 Catholic Schools in the nation by the Catholic High School Honor Roll and is a part of the Catholic Education Honor Roll for 2018–2023. Archbishop McCarthy is an Apple Distinguished School. AMHS has received recognition for its innovations in Catholic Education from Today's Catholic Teacher.

== Campus ==
Archbishop McCarthy High School is a Catholic college preparatory institution in the South Florida area. The campus consists of a main two-story building, a football field with a surrounding track, one baseball diamond, one softball diamond, a Student Center with its own "Maverick Grill" and a Performing Arts Center. The school has an air conditioned gymnasium, indoor weight room, five "learning modules", an outdoor courtyard, a chapel, and a parking area.

== The iPad 2 Program ==
With the start of the 2011–2012 school year, Archbishop McCarthy High School implemented a student one-to-one iPad school, making it the first in South Florida.

== Academics ==
The school is a college preparatory institution. Archbishop McCarthy has been awarded National Catholic high school honor roll every year since 2005. The school has a dual enrollment program through St. Thomas University in addition to an Advanced Placement Program. AMHS draws students from Broward, Dade and Palm Beach counties.

== Athletics ==
As of 2015, sponsored sports activities at the school included:

- Baseball
- Basketball (Men's)
- Basketball (Women's)
- Bowling (Men's)
- Bowling (Women's)
- Cross Country
- Cheerleading (Women's)
- Dance
- Equestrian
- Flag Football (Women's)
- Football
- Golf
- Ice Hockey
- Lacrosse (Men's and Women's (2017))
- Marching Band
- Rugby
- Soccer (Men's)
- Soccer (Women's)
- Softball
- Swimming
- Tennis (Men's)
- Tennis (Women's)
- Track
- Volleyball
- Wrestling
- Weightlifting (Women's)

== Sister school ==
Archbishop Edward McCarthy High School is the sister school of Archbishop Coleman F. Carroll High School. Both schools have identical original building blueprints and similar school colors. Both schools were established in 1998.
