= 2016–17 North Dakota Fighting Hawks men's basketball team =

American college basketball season

2016–17 North Dakota Fighting Hawks men's basketball

Big Sky regular season and tournament champions

NCAA tournament, First Round
- Conference: Big Sky Conference
- Record: 22–10 (14–4 Big Sky)
- Head coach: Brian Jones (11th season)
- Assistant coaches: Brad Davidson; Steve Grabowski; Jeff Horner
- Home arena: Betty Engelstad Sioux Center

2016–17 Big Sky men's basketball standings
	Conf.				Overall
Team	W		L	PCT	W		L	PCT
North Dakota †	14	–	4	.778	22	–	10	.688
Eastern Washington	13	–	5	.722	22	–	12	.647
Idaho	12	–	6	.667	19	–	14	.576
Weber State	12	–	6	.667	20	–	14	.588
Montana	11	–	7	.611	16	–	16	.500
Montana State	11	–	7	.611	16	–	16	.500
Sacramento State	9	–	9	.500	13	–	18	.419
Portland State	7	–	11	.389	15	–	16	.484
Northern Colorado*	7	–	11	.389	11	–	18	.379
Northern Arizona	6	–	12	.333	9	–	23	.281
Southern Utah	3	–	15	.167	6	–	27	.182
Idaho State	3	–	15	.167	5	–	26	.161
† Conference tournament winner

The 2016–17 North Dakota Fighting Hawks Men's Basketball team represented the University of North Dakota during the 2016–17 NCAA Division I men's basketball season. The Fighting Hawks, led by 11th-year head coach Brian Jones, played their home games at the Betty Engelstad Sioux Center in Grand Forks, North Dakota as members of the Big Sky Conference. They finished the season 22–10, 14–4 in Big Sky play to win the Big Sky regular season championship. In the Big Sky tournament, they defeated Portland State, Idaho, and Weber State to win the tournament championship. As a result, they received the conference's automatic bid to the NCAA tournament. As a No. 15 seed in the West region, they lost to No. 2-seeded and No. 4-ranked Arizona in the first round.

== Previous season ==
The Fighting Hawks finished the 2015–16 season 17–16, 10–8 in Big Sky play to finish in a tie for fifth place. They defeated Southern Utah and Idaho State to advance to the semifinals of the Big Sky tournament where they lost to Weber State. They were invited to the CollegeInsider.com Tournament where they lost in the first round to UC Irvine.

== Offseason ==
=== Departures ===
Name	Number	Pos.	Height	Weight	Year	Hometown	Notes
Adam McDermott	3	G	6'4"	175	Freshman	Cedar Falls, IA	Transferred to Northern Iowa
Shane Benton	10	C	7'0"	230	RS Senior	Cedar Rapids, IA	Graduated
Wheeler Baker	13	G	6'2"	175	Sophomore	Brooklyn Park, MN	Left the team for personal reasons
Dustin Hobaugh	25	F	6'5"	200	RS Senior	League City, TX	Graduated
Bryce Cashman	31	C	6'10"	225	Sophomore	Weston, MO	Left the team for personal reasons
James Richman	50	F	6'7"	220	RS Freshman	Tower City, ND	Walk-on; didn't return

=== Incoming transfers ===
Name	Number	Pos.	Height	Weight	Year	Hometown	Previous School
Solomon Rolls-Tyson	10	F	6'8"	200	Junior	Birmingham, AL	Junior college transferred from College of Eastern Utah
Jafar Kinsey	11	G	6'2"	185	Junior	Syracuse, NY	Junior college transferred from Des Moines Area CC
Marlon Stewart	13	G	6'3"	190	Sophomore	Eldridge, IA	Transferred from Creighton. Under NCAA transfer rules, Stewart will have to sit out for the 2016–17 season. Will have three years of remaining eligibility.

=== 2016 recruiting class ===
College recruiting information
Name	Hometown	School	Height	Weight	Commit date
Kienan Walter; SG	Vancouver, WA	King's Way Christian School	6 ft 6 in (1.98 m)	185 lb (84 kg)	May 28, 2015
Kienan Walter; SG	Recruit ratings: Scout: Rivals: (67)				
Billy Brown; SG	Spirit Lake, IA	Spirit Lake High School	6 ft 3 in (1.91 m)	160 lb (73 kg)	Jun 22, 2015
Billy Brown; SG	Recruit ratings: Scout: Rivals: (NR)				
Overall recruit ranking:
Note: In many cases, Scout, Rivals, 247Sports, On3, and ESPN may conflict in their listings of height and weight.; In these cases, the average was taken. ESPN grades are on a 100-point scale.; Sources: "2016 Team Ranking". Rivals.

=== 2017 incoming recruits ===
College recruiting information (2017)
Name	Hometown	School	Height	Weight	Commit date
Garrett Franken; SF	Atlantic, IA	Atlantic High School	6 ft 7 in (2.01 m)	190 lb (86 kg)	Jul 10, 2016
Garrett Franken; SF	Recruit ratings: Scout: Rivals: (NR)				
Overall recruit ranking:
Note: In many cases, Scout, Rivals, 247Sports, On3, and ESPN may conflict in their listings of height and weight.; In these cases, the average was taken. ESPN grades are on a 100-point scale.; Sources: "2017 Team Ranking". Rivals.

== Roster ==
2016–17 North Dakota Fighting Hawks men's basketball team
Players
Coaches

Pos.	#	Name	Height	Weight	Year	Previous school	Hometown
G	0	Geno Crandall	6 ft 3 in (1.91 m)	170 lb (77 kg)	RS So	DeLaSalle	Minneapolis, MN
G	1	Corey Baldwin	6 ft 3 in (1.91 m)	190 lb (86 kg)	Sr	Warren Harden; Northeastern Oklahoma A&M	Bridgeport, CT
F	2	Josh Collins	6 ft 6 in (1.98 m)	220 lb (100 kg)	So	DeLaSalle	Minneapolis, MN
G	3	Billy Brown	6 ft 3 in (1.91 m)	175 lb (79 kg)	Fr	Spirit Lake	Spirit Lake, IA
C	5	Carson Shanks	7 ft 0 in (2.13 m)	245 lb (111 kg)	RS Jr	Prior Lake; Utah State	Prior Lake, MN
F	10	Solomon Rolls-Tyson	6 ft 8 in (2.03 m)	200 lb (91 kg)	Jr	West Midlands; Utah State Eastern	Birmingham, England
G	11	Jafar Kinsley	6 ft 2 in (1.88 m)	185 lb (84 kg)	Jr	Jamesville-DeWitt; Des Moines Area CC	Syracuse, NY
G	13	Marlon Stewart (I) (redshirt)	6 ft 1 in (1.85 m)	210 lb (95 kg)	So	North Scott; Creighton	Eldridge, IA
G	15	Cortez Seales	6 ft 4 in (1.93 m)	180 lb (82 kg)	So	North Scott	Eldridge, IA
G	20	Thomas Blake (W)	6 ft 2 in (1.88 m)	200 lb (91 kg)	RS Sr	St. Maria Goretti	Hagerstown, MD
G	21	Quinton Hooker	6 ft 0 in (1.83 m)	205 lb (93 kg)	Sr	Park Center	Brooklyn Park, MN
F	23	Kienan Walter	6 ft 8 in (2.03 m)	190 lb (86 kg)	Fr	King's Way Christian	Vancouver, WA
G	25	Devon Pekas	6 ft 4 in (1.93 m)	210 lb (95 kg)	Sr	Hawley; Liberty	Hawley, MN
F	32	Conner Avants	6 ft 7 in (2.01 m)	230 lb (104 kg)	So	Deer Creek	Edmond, OK
F	43	Drick Bernstine	6 ft 8 in (2.03 m)	220 lb (100 kg)	RS Jr	Cherokee Trail; Denver	Aurora, CO

Head coach

- Brian Jones (Northern Iowa)

Assistant coach(es)

- Brad Davidson
- Steve Grabowski (Minot State)
- Jeff Horner (Iowa)

Legend

- (C) Team captain
- (S) Suspended
- (I) Ineligible
- (W) Walk-on
- Injured
- Current redshirt

Roster

== Schedule and results ==
Date time, TV	Rank^{#}	Opponent^{#}	Result	Record	Site (attendance) city, state
Non-conference regular season
11/11/2016*; 1:00 pm		Crown	W 98–48	1–0	Betty Engelstad Sioux Center; Grand Forks, ND
11/15/2016*; 7:00 pm		Mayville State	W 94–66	2–0	Betty Engelstad Sioux Center (1,681); Grand Forks, ND
11/20/2016*; 4:00 pm		Presentation	W 101–63	3–0	Betty Engelstad Sioux Center (1,573); Grand Forks, ND
11/25/2016*; 3:30 pm		vs. North Florida; Men vs. Cancer Classic	L 75–76	3–1	Nutter Center (3,123); Dayton, OH
11/26/2016*; 6:00 pm		at Wright State; Men vs. Cancer Classic	L 79–83	3–2	Nutter Center (3,024); Dayton, OH
11/27/2016*; 1:00 pm		vs. Cal State Bakersfield; Men vs. Cancer Classic	W 57–55	4–2	Nutter Center (2,975); Dayton, OH
12/07/2016*; 7:00 pm, ESPN3		at North Dakota State	W 74–56	5–2	Scheels Center (5,022); Fargo, ND
12/10/2016*; 7:00 pm, ESPN3		at Northern Iowa	L 70–78	5–3	McLeod Center (4,521); Cedar Falls, IA
12/16/2016*; 8:00 pm		North Dakota State	L 70–87	5–4	Betty Engelstad Sioux Center (2,428); Grand Forks, ND
12/20/2016*; 8:00 pm, BTN		at Iowa	L 73–84	5–5	Carver–Hawkeye Arena (11,099); Iowa City, IA
Big Sky regular season
12/29/2016; 9:00 pm		at Portland State	L 62–99	5–6 (0–1)	Peter Stott Center (612); Portland, OR
12/31/2016; 2:00 pm		at Sacramento State	W 90–82 ^{OT}	6–6 (1–1)	Hornets Nest (505); Sacramento, CA
01/05/2017; 7:00 pm		Northern Arizona	W 68–63	7–6 (2–1)	Betty Engelstad Sioux Center (1,518); Grand Forks, ND
01/07/2017; 4:00 pm		Southern Utah	W 95–65	8–6 (3–1)	Betty Engelstad Sioux Center (1,749); Grand Forks, ND
01/12/2017; 8:00 pm		at Montana State	W 90–85	9–7 (4–1)	Brick Breeden Fieldhouse (2,629); Bozeman, MT
01/14/2017; 8:00 pm		at Montana	L 70–76	9–7 (4–2)	Dahlberg Arena (3,719); Missoula, MT
01/19/2017; 7:00 pm		Weber State	W 83–77	10–7 (5–2)	Betty Engelstad Sioux Center (2,362); Grand Forks, ND
01/21/2017; 2:00 pm		Idaho State	W 89–64	11–7 (6–2)	Betty Engelstad Sioux Center (2,570); Grand Forks, ND
01/26/2017; 7:30 pm		at Southern Utah	W 91–89	12–7 (7–2)	Centrum Arena (2,069); Cedar City, UT
01/28/2017; 3:00 pm		at Northern Arizona	L 67–68	12–8 (7–3)	Walkup Skydome (1,658); Flagstaff, AZ
02/04/2017; 2:00 pm		Northern Colorado	W 87–77 ^{OT}	13–8 (8–3)	Betty Engelstad Sioux Center (2,352); Grand Forks, ND
02/09/2017; 7:00 pm		Eastern Washington	W 95–86	14–8 (9–3)	Betty Engelstad Sioux Center (1,891); Grand Forks, ND
02/11/2017; 4:00 pm		Idaho	W 88–65	15–8 (10–3)	Betty Engelstad Sioux Center (2,345); Grand Forks, ND
02/16/2017; 8:00 pm		at Idaho State	W 77–61	16–8 (11–3)	Holt Arena (1,415); Pocatello, ID
02/18/2017; 8:00 pm		at Weber State	W 77–68	17–8 (12–3)	Dee Events Center (7,658); Logan, UT
02/25/2017; 8:00 pm		at Northern Colorado	W 84–81 ^{OT}	18–8 (13–3)	Bank of Colorado Arena (2,132); Greeley, CO
03/02/2017; 7:00 pm		Sacramento State	L 53–57	18–9 (13–4)	Betty Engelstad Sioux Center (2,266); Grand Forks, ND
03/04/2017; 4:00 pm		Portland State	W 82–73	19–9 (14–4)	Betty Engelstad Sioux Center (2,870); Grand Forks, ND
Big Sky tournament
03/09/2017; 12:05 pm	(1)	vs. (8) Portland State; Quarterfinals	W 95–72	20–9	Reno Events Center (1,762); Reno, NV
03/09/2017; 5:35 pm	(1)	vs. (4) Idaho; Semifinals	W 69–64	21–9	Reno Events Center (2,003); Reno, NV
03/09/2017; 5:30 pm, ESPNU	(1)	vs. (3) Weber State; Championship	W 93–89 ^{OT}	22–9	Reno Events Center (2,025); Reno, NV
NCAA tournament
03/16/2017*; 8:30 pm, TBS	(15 W)	vs. (2 W) No. 2 Arizona; First Round	L 82–100	22–10	Vivint Smart Home Arena (16,341); Salt Lake City, UT
*Non-conference game. ^{#}Rankings from AP Poll. (#) Tournament seedings in parentheses. W=West Region Source. All times are in Central Time.
