= 2016–17 Sacramento State Hornets men's basketball team =

American college basketball season

2016–17 Sacramento State Hornets men's basketball
- Conference: Big Sky Conference
- Record: 13–18 (9–9 Big Sky)
- Head coach: Brian Katz (9th season)
- Assistant coaches: Brandon Laird; Ajay Riding; Chris Walker
- Home arena: Hornets Nest

2016–17 Big Sky men's basketball standings
	Conf.				Overall
Team	W		L	PCT	W		L	PCT
North Dakota †	14	–	4	.778	22	–	10	.688
Eastern Washington	13	–	5	.722	22	–	12	.647
Idaho	12	–	6	.667	19	–	14	.576
Weber State	12	–	6	.667	20	–	14	.588
Montana	11	–	7	.611	16	–	16	.500
Montana State	11	–	7	.611	16	–	16	.500
Sacramento State	9	–	9	.500	13	–	18	.419
Portland State	7	–	11	.389	15	–	16	.484
Northern Colorado*	7	–	11	.389	11	–	18	.379
Northern Arizona	6	–	12	.333	9	–	23	.281
Southern Utah	3	–	15	.167	6	–	27	.182
Idaho State	3	–	15	.167	5	–	26	.161
† Conference tournament winner

The 2016–17 Sacramento State Hornets men's basketball team represented California State University, Sacramento during the 2016–17 NCAA Division I men's basketball season. The Hornets were led by ninth-year head coach Brian Katz and played their home games at the Hornets Nest as members of the Big Sky Conference. They finished the season 13–18, 9–9 in Big Sky play to finish in seventh place. As the No. 7 seed in the Big Sky tournament, they defeated Idaho State in the first round before losing to Eastern Washington in the quarterfinals.

== Previous season ==
The Hornets finished the 2015–16 season 14–17, 6–12 in Big Sky play to finish in tenth place. They defeated Montana State in the first round of the Big Sky tournament to advance to the Quarterfinals where they lost to Montana.

== Departures ==
Name	Number	Pos.	Height	Weight	Year	Hometown	Notes
Dreon Barlett	1	G	6'3"	190	Senior	Huntington Beach, CA	Graduated
Cody Demps	2	G	6'4"	195	Senior	Elk Grove, CA	Graduated
Mason Stuteville	21	F	6'11"	230	Sophomore	Orangevale, CA	Transferred to California Baptist
Aaron Harmetz	24	G	5'10"	175	Freshman	Sacramento, CA	Left the team for personal reasons

== 2016 incoming recruits ==
College recruiting information
Name	Hometown	School	Height	Weight	Commit date
Chibueze Jacobs #100 SF	Sherman Oaks, CA	Notre Dame High School	6 ft 5 in (1.96 m)	170 lb (77 kg)	Apr 6, 2016
Chibueze Jacobs #100 SF	Recruit ratings: Scout: Rivals: (62)				
George Dancer; SG	Modesto, CA	Beyer High School	6 ft 3 in (1.91 m)	185 lb (84 kg)	Jul 8, 2015
George Dancer; SG	Recruit ratings: Scout: Rivals: (NR)				
Izayah Mauriohooho-Le'afa; PG	Wellington, New Zealand	St. Patrick's College	6 ft 2 in (1.88 m)	195 lb (88 kg)	Aug 7, 2016
Izayah Mauriohooho-Le'afa; PG	Recruit ratings: Scout: Rivals: (NR)				
Overall recruit ranking:
Note: In many cases, Scout, Rivals, 247Sports, On3, and ESPN may conflict in their listings of height and weight.; In these cases, the average was taken. ESPN grades are on a 100-point scale.; Sources: "2016 Team Ranking". Rivals.

== Roster ==
2016–17 Sacramento State Hornets men's basketball team
Players
Coaches

Pos.	#	Name	Height	Weight	Year	Previous school	Hometown
G	0	Marcus Graves	6 ft 0 in (1.83 m)	188 lb (85 kg)	Jr	Westview HS	San Diego, CA
G/F	1	Chibueze Jacobs	6 ft 4 in (1.93 m)	200 lb (91 kg)	Fr	Notre Dame HS	Canyon Country, CA
F	3	Justin Strings	6 ft 7 in (2.01 m)	230 lb (104 kg)	Jr	Mira Costa HS	Carson, CA
G	4	Jiday Ugbaja	5 ft 11 in (1.8 m)	190 lb (86 kg)	Jr	Archbishop Riordan HS	San Francisco, CA
G	11	Trevis Jackson (W)	5 ft 11 in (1.8 m)	171 lb (78 kg)	Sr	Santa Monica HS	Santa Monica, CA
G/F	12	Grant Dressler	6 ft 6 in (1.98 m)	194 lb (88 kg)	So	Palo Verde HS	Las Vegas, NV
G	14	Jeff Wu	6 ft 2 in (1.88 m)	180 lb (82 kg)	So	Modesto Christian School	Taipei, Taiwan
G	15	Matt Battaglia (W)	6 ft 0 in (1.83 m)	180 lb (82 kg)	Fr	Oak Ridge HS	El Dorado Hills, CA
G	20	George Dancer	6 ft 3 in (1.91 m)	190 lb (86 kg)	Fr	Beyer HS	Modesto, CA
G	24	Izayah Mauriohooho-Le'afa	6 ft 2 in (1.88 m)	190 lb (86 kg)	Fr	St. Patrick's College	Wellington, NZ
F	30	Joshua Patton	6 ft 8 in (2.03 m)	222 lb (101 kg)	RS Fr	Sierra HS	Manteca, CA
G/F	33	Nick Hornsby	6 ft 7 in (2.01 m)	235 lb (107 kg)	Sr	Tustin HS	Irvine, CA
C	44	Eric Stuteville	6 ft 11 in (2.11 m)	256 lb (116 kg)	Sr	Casa Roble HS	Orangevale, CA
C	50	James Herrick	6 ft 10 in (2.08 m)	254 lb (115 kg)	Jr	Douglas HS	Minden, NV

Head coach

- Brian Katz (Sacramento State)

Assistant coach(es)

- Brandon Laird (UC Davis)
- Ajay Riding (Fresno State)
- Chris Walker (Oklahoma)

Legend

- (C) Team captain
- (S) Suspended
- (I) Ineligible
- (W) Walk-on
- Injured
- Current redshirt

Roster

== Schedule and results ==
Date time, TV	Rank^{#}	Opponent^{#}	Result	Record	Site (attendance) city, state
Exhibition
11/03/2016*; 7:05 pm		Pacific Union	W 84–53		Hornets Nest (557); Sacramento, CA
Non-conference regular season
11/11/2016*; 6:00 pm, P12N		at Colorado	L 53–90	0–1	Coors Events Center (8,322); Boulder, CO
11/13/2016*; 5:05 pm, BTN		at Nebraska	L 61–83	0–2	Pinnacle Bank Arena (15,883); Lincoln, NE
11/17/2016*; 7:05 pm		Antelope Valley	W 82–60	1–2	Hornets Nest (459); Sacramento, CA
11/21/2016*; 5:30 pm		vs. UC Davis; Sacramento Showcase	L 72–81	1–3	Golden 1 Center (300); Sacramento, CA
11/26/2016*; 3:35 pm		vs. San Francisco; EWU Men's Basketball Classic	L 59–77	1–4	Reese Court (300); Cheney, WA
11/27/2016*; 12:05 pm		vs. Denver; EWU Men's Basketball Classic	L 61–72	1–5	Reese Court (300); Cheney, WA
12/01/2016*; 7:05 pm		at Pacific	L 58–74	1–6	Alex G. Spanos Center (2,094); Stockton, CA
12/03/2016*; 5:05 pm		UC Merced	W 81–54	2–6	Hornets Nest (801); Sacramento, CA
12/10/2016*; 2:05 pm		at South Dakota	L 56–72	2–7	Sanford Coyote Sports Center (1,515); Vermillion, SD
12/17/2016*; 7:05 pm		Abilene Christian	W 88–86 ^{OT}	3–7	Hornets Nest (556); Sacramento, CA
12/21/2016*; 6:00 pm, P12N		at Washington State	L 66–74	3–8	Beasley Coliseum (2,248); Pullman, WA
Big Sky regular season
12/29/2016; 7:05 pm		Northern Colorado	L 53–69	3–9 (0–1)	Hornets Nest (593); Sacramento, CA
12/31/2016; 12:05 pm		North Dakota	L 82–90 ^{OT}	3–10 (0–2)	Hornets Nest (505); Sacramento, CA
01/07/2017; 7:05 pm		at Portland State	L 76–83	3–11 (0–3)	Peter Stott Center (211); Portland, OR
01/12/2017; 5:30 pm		at Southern Utah	W 88–83	4–11 (1–3)	Centrum Arena (1,668); Cedar City, UT
01/14/2017; 11:30 am		at Northern Arizona	W 74–62	5–11 (2–3)	Walkup Skydome (659); Flagstaff, AZ
01/19/2017; 7:05 pm		Montana State	L 65–74	5–12 (2–4)	Hornets Nest (751); Sacramento, CA
01/21/2017; 7:05 pm		Montana	W 92–83	6–12 (3–4)	Hornets Nest (1,112); Sacramento, CA
01/28/2017; 7:05 pm		Portland State	W 80–77 ^{OT}	7–12 (4–4)	Hornets Nest (916); Sacramento, CA
02/02/2017; 6:05 pm		at Eastern Washington	L 72–77	7–13 (4–5)	Reese Court (1,502); Cheney, WA
02/04/2017; 7:00 pm		at Idaho	L 67–81	7–14 (4–6)	Cowan Spectrum (1,629); Moscow, ID
02/09/2017; 7:05 pm		Weber State	W 77–74	8–14 (5–6)	Hornets Nest (908); Sacramento, CA
02/11/2017; 7:05 pm		Idaho State	W 75–63	9–14 (6–6)	Hornets Nest (975); Sacramento, CA
02/16/2017; 6:00 pm		at Montana	W 67–65	10–14 (7–6)	Dahlberg Arena (4,023); Missoula, MT
02/18/2017; 1:00 pm		at Montana State	L 59–62	10–15 (7–7)	Brick Breeden Fieldhouse (2,916); Bozeman, MT
02/23/2017; 7:05 pm		Northern Arizona	L 69–73	10–16 (7–8)	Hornets Nest (849); Sacramento, CA
02/25/2017; 7:05 pm		Southern Utah	W 86–76	11–16 (8–8)	Hornets Nest (902); Sacramento, CA
03/02/2017; 5:00 pm		at North Dakota	W 57–53	12–16 (9–8)	Betty Engelstad Sioux Center (2,266); Grand Forks, ND
03/04/2017; 1:00 pm		at Northern Colorado	L 67–70	12–17 (9–9)	Bank of Colorado Arena (1,305); Greeley, CO
Big Sky tournament
03/07/2017; 5:35 pm	(7)	vs. (10) Idaho State; First Round	W 91–76	13–17	Reno Events Center (1,507); Reno, NV
03/09/2017; 5:35 pm	(7)	vs. (2) Eastern Washington; Quarterfinals	L 70–89	13–18	Reno Events Center (1,903); Reno, NV
*Non-conference game. ^{#}Rankings from AP Poll. (#) Tournament seedings in parentheses. All times are in Pacific Time Source.
