= 2016–17 Northern Colorado Bears men's basketball team =

American college basketball season

2016–17 Northern Colorado Bears men's basketball
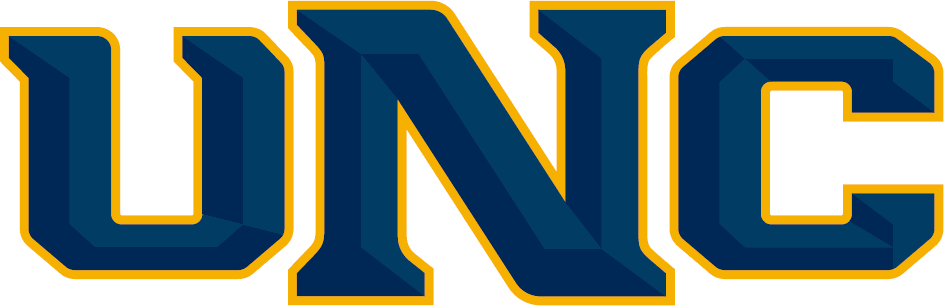
- Conference: Big Sky Conference
- Record: 11–18 (7–11 Big Sky)
- Head coach: Jeff Linder (1st season)
- Assistant coaches: Steve Smiley; Ken DeWeese; Vinnie McGhee
- Home arena: Bank of Colorado Arena

2016–17 Big Sky men's basketball standings
	Conf.				Overall
Team	W		L	PCT	W		L	PCT
North Dakota †	14	–	4	.778	22	–	10	.688
Eastern Washington	13	–	5	.722	22	–	12	.647
Idaho	12	–	6	.667	19	–	14	.576
Weber State	12	–	6	.667	20	–	14	.588
Montana	11	–	7	.611	16	–	16	.500
Montana State	11	–	7	.611	16	–	16	.500
Sacramento State	9	–	9	.500	13	–	18	.419
Portland State	7	–	11	.389	15	–	16	.484
Northern Colorado*	7	–	11	.389	11	–	18	.379
Northern Arizona	6	–	12	.333	9	–	23	.281
Southern Utah	3	–	15	.167	6	–	27	.182
Idaho State	3	–	15	.167	5	–	26	.161
† Conference tournament winner

The 2016–17 Northern Colorado Bears men's basketball team represented the University of Northern Colorado during the 2016–17 NCAA Division I men's basketball season. The Bears were led by first-year head coach Jeff Linder and played their home games at Bank of Colorado Arena in Greeley, Colorado. They were members of the Big Sky Conference. They finished the season 11–18, 7–11 in Big Sky play to finish in a tie for eighth place. On October 8, 2016, the school self-imposed a postseason ban amid an ongoing NCAA investigation.

== Previous season ==
The Bears finished the 2015–16 season 10–21, 7–11 in Big Sky play to finish in ninth place. They lost to Portland State in the first round of the Big Sky tournament.

On April 21, 2016, the school fired head coach B. J. Hill amid an NCAA investigation into "serious and concerning" allegations of violations within the program. On May 1, the school hired Jeff Linder as head coach.

== Departures ==
Name	Number	Pos.	Height	Weight	Year	Hometown	Notes
Cameron Michael	2	G	6'5"	185	Junior	Loveland, CO	Retired from basketball due to a concussion injury
Jamal Evans	5	F	6'7"	205	Junior	St. Petersburg, FL	Transferred
Miles Seward	15	G	6'3"	175	Freshman	Toronto, ON	Transferred to Harcum College
Kenny Lesley	40	F	6'8"	215	Freshman	Elsberry, MO	Transferred to Moberly Area CC
Dallas Anglin	55	G	6'1"	185	RS Junior	Montclair, NJ	Left the team for personal reasons

=== Incoming transfers ===
Name	Number	Pos.	Height	Weight	Year	Hometown	Previous School
Gerad Davis	1	G	6'3"	175	Junior	Las Vegas, NV	Junior college transferred from Casper College
D. J. Davis	3	G	6'6"	195	Junior	Lakewood, CO	Junior college transferred from Otero JC
Andre Spight	11	G	6'3"	175	Senior	Pasadena, CA	Transferred from Arizona State. Under NCAA transfer rules, Spight will not play for the 2016–17 season. Will have one year of remaining eligibility.

== 2016 incoming recruits ==
College recruiting information
Name	Hometown	School	Height	Weight	Commit date
Michael Ranson; SG	Pueblo, CO	Central High School	6 ft 2 in (1.88 m)	185 lb (84 kg)	Jun 18, 2015
Michael Ranson; SG	Recruit ratings: Scout: Rivals: (NR)				
Kyle Carey; SG	London, England	Myerscough College	6 ft 6 in (1.98 m)	190 lb (86 kg)	May 23, 2016
Kyle Carey; SG	Recruit ratings: Scout: Rivals: (NR)				
Roberto Vercellino; SF	Torino, Italy	Liceo Scientifico Statale A.B. Sabin	6 ft 7 in (2.01 m)	210 lb (95 kg)	May 26, 2016
Roberto Vercellino; SF	Recruit ratings: Scout: Rivals: (NR)				
Kai Edwards; PF	Amsterdam, Netherlands	Canarias Basketball Academy	6 ft 9 in (2.06 m)	215 lb (98 kg)	Apr 14, 2016
Kai Edwards; PF	Recruit ratings: Scout: Rivals: (NR)				
Overall recruit ranking:
Note: In many cases, Scout, Rivals, 247Sports, On3, and ESPN may conflict in their listings of height and weight.; In these cases, the average was taken. ESPN grades are on a 100-point scale.; Sources: "2016 Team Ranking". Rivals.

== Roster ==
2016–17 Northern Colorado Bears men's basketball team
Players
Coaches

Pos.	#	Name	Height	Weight	Year	Previous school	Hometown
G	0	Jordan Davis	6 ft 2 in (1.88 m)	185 lb (84 kg)	So	Canyon Springs	Las Vegas, NV
G	1	Gerad Davis	6 ft 3 in (1.91 m)	195 lb (88 kg)	Jr	Canyon Springs; Casper College	Las Vegas, NV
G	2	Kyle Carey	6 ft 6 in (1.98 m)	190 lb (86 kg)	Fr	Myserscough	London, England
G	3	D. J. Miles	6 ft 6 in (1.98 m)	195 lb (88 kg)	Jr	Bear Creek; Otero JC	Lakewood, CO
G	4	Tyler Loose (W)	6 ft 0 in (1.83 m)	180 lb (82 kg)	RS Jr	Laramie; Casper College	Laramie, WY
G	5	Mike Ranson	6 ft 2 in (1.88 m)	185 lb (84 kg)	Fr	Central	Pueblo, CO
F	10	Ibrahim Sylla	6 ft 8 in (2.03 m)	220 lb (100 kg)	RS So	South	Denver, CO
G	11	Andre Spight (W) (redshirt)	6 ft 3 in (1.91 m)	170 lb (77 kg)	Sr	Burbank; Arizona State	Burbank, CA
G	12	Jonah Radebaugh (W)	6 ft 2 in (1.88 m)	165 lb (75 kg)	RS Fr	Northglen	Thornton, CO
G	13	Chaz Glotta	6 ft 2 in (1.88 m)	170 lb (77 kg)	RS So	Fort Zumwalt North; Southern Illinois	O'Fallon, MO
F	20	Tanner Morgan	6 ft 9 in (2.06 m)	230 lb (104 kg)	Sr	Sprague; Casper College	Salem, OR
F	21	Roberto Vercellino	6 ft 7 in (2.01 m)	210 lb (95 kg)	Fr	Liceo Scientifco A.B. Sabin	Turin, Italy
G	24	Anthony Johnson	6 ft 2 in (1.88 m)	190 lb (86 kg)	Sr	Decatur Central	Indianapolis, IN
F	25	Kai Edwards	6 ft 9 in (2.06 m)	215 lb (98 kg)	Fr	Canarias Basketball Academy	Amsterdam, Netherlands
G	30	Jon'te Dotson (W)	6 ft 3 in (1.91 m)	185 lb (84 kg)	Sr	Lincoln	Denver, CO
F	33	Jeremy Verhagen	6 ft 10 in (2.08 m)	220 lb (100 kg)	RS Jr	Florence	Florence, AZ

Head coach

- Jeff Linder (Western Colorado)

Assistant coach(es)

- Steve Smiley (Northern State)
- Ken DeWeese (Mary Hardin–Baylor)
- Vinnie McGhee (Cal State Northridge)

Legend

- (C) Team captain
- (S) Suspended
- (I) Ineligible
- (W) Walk-on
- Injured
- Current redshirt

Roster

== Schedule and results ==
Date time, TV	Opponent	Result	Record	Site (attendance) city, state
Exhibition
11/02/2016*; 7:00 pm	Johnson & Wales	W 91–67		Bank of Colorado Arena (563); Greeley, CO
Non-conference regular season
11/12/2016*; 5:30 pm, FS2	at Butler	L 52–89	0–1	Hinkle Fieldhouse (7,836); Indianapolis, IN
11/16/2016*; 7:00 pm	Colorado Christian	W 94–73	1–1	Bank of Colorado Arena (1,008); Greeley, CO
11/19/2016*; 8:00 pm	at Santa Clara; Las Vegas Invitational	L 72–88	1–2	Leavey Center (1,331); Santa Clara, CA
11/21/2016*; 7:00 pm, P12N	at No. 8 Arizona; Las Vegas Invitational	L 55–71	1–3	McKale Center (14,397); Tucson, AZ
11/24/2016*; 3:00 pm	vs. Sacred Heart; Las Vegas Invitational visitors' semifinal	W 81–59	2–3	Orleans Arena; Paradise, NV
11/25/2016*; 3:00 pm	vs. Bucknell; Las Vegas Invitational visitors' championship	L 63–75	2–4	Orleans Arena; Paradise, NV
11/29/2016*; 6:00 pm	at Oklahoma	L 66–87	2–5	Lloyd Noble Center (7,579); Norman, OK
12/03/2016*; 2:00 pm	Northern New Mexico	W 97–73	3–5	Bank of Colorado Arena (989); Greeley, CO
12/10/2016*; 2:00 pm	at Colorado State	L 64–81	3–6	Moby Arena (3,114); Fort Collins, CO
12/17/2016*; 1:00 pm	at Denver	L 70–73	3–7	Magness Arena (3,421); Denver, CO
12/20/2016*; 6:00 pm	UC Riverside	W 77–61	4–7	Bank of Colorado Arena (1,232); Greeley, CO
Big Sky regular season
12/29/2016; 8:00 pm	at Sacramento State	W 69–53	5–7 (1–0)	Hornets Nest (593); Sacramento, CA
12/31/2016; 3:00 pm	at Portland State	W 73–59	6–7 (2–0)	Peter Stott Center (506); Portland, OR
01/05/2017; 7:00 pm	Southern Utah	L 76–78	6–8 (2–1)	Bank of Colorado Arena (833); Greeley, CO
01/07/2017; 7:00 pm	Northern Arizona	W 83–79	7–8 (3–1)	Bank of Colorado Arena (1,018); Greeley, CO
01/12/2017; 7:00 pm	at Montana	L 68–89	7–9 (3–2)	Dahlberg Arena (3,438); Missoula, MT
01/14/2017; 2:00 pm	at Montana State	L 53–68	7–10 (3–3)	Brick Breeden Fieldhouse (2,313); Bozeman, MT
01/19/2017; 7:00 pm	Idaho State	L 69–73	7–11 (3–4)	Bank of Colorado Arena (1,865); Greeley, CO
01/21/2017; 7:00 pm	Weber State	L 69–74	7–12 (3–5)	Bank of Colorado Arena (1,915); Greeley, CO
01/26/2017; 7:00 pm	at Northern Arizona	L 50–63	7–13 (3–6)	Dee Events Center (1,713); Ogden, UT
01/28/2017; 2:00 pm	at Southern Utah	W 89–71	8–13 (4–6)	Centrum Arena (1,802); Cedar City, UT
02/04/2017; 6:00 pm	at North Dakota	W 87–77 ^{OT}	8–14 (4–7)	Betty Engelstad Sioux Center (2,352); Grand Forks, ND
02/09/2017; 7:00 pm	Idaho	L 76–88	8–15 (4–8)	Bank of Colorado Arena (1,059); Greeley, CO
02/11/2017; 2:00 pm	Eastern Washington	L 44–70	8–16 (4–9)	Bank of Colorado Arena (1,057); Greeley, CO
02/16/2017; 7:00 pm	at Weber State	L 63–69	8–17 (4–10)	Dee Events Center (6,641); Ogden, UT
02/18/2017; 7:00 pm	at Idaho State	W 87–81	9–17 (5–10)	Holt Arena (1,436); Pocatello, ID
02/25/2017; 7:00 pm	North Dakota	L 81–84 ^{OT}	9–18 (5–11)	Bank of Colorado Arena (2,132); Greeley, CO
03/02/2017; 7:00 pm	Portland State	L 84–87	10–18 (6–11)	Bank of Colorado Arena (1,282); Greeley, CO
03/04/2017; 2:00 pm	Sacramento State	W 70–67	11–18 (7–11)	Bank of Colorado Arena (1,305); Greeley, CO
*Non-conference game. ^{#}Rankings from AP Poll. (#) Tournament seedings in parentheses. All times are in Mountain Time.
