= 2017 Big Sky Conference men's basketball tournament =

College basketball tournament

- Classification: Division I
- Season: 2016–17
- Teams: 11
- Site: Reno Events Center; Reno, Nevada
- Champions: North Dakota Fighting Hawks (1st title)
- Winning coach: Brian Jones (1st title)
- MVP: Quinton Hooker (North Dakota)
- Television: ESPNU (final)

2016–17 Big Sky men's basketball standings
	Conf.				Overall
Team	W		L	PCT	W		L	PCT
North Dakota †	14	–	4	.778	22	–	10	.688
Eastern Washington	13	–	5	.722	22	–	12	.647
Idaho	12	–	6	.667	19	–	14	.576
Weber State	12	–	6	.667	20	–	14	.588
Montana	11	–	7	.611	16	–	16	.500
Montana State	11	–	7	.611	16	–	16	.500
Sacramento State	9	–	9	.500	13	–	18	.419
Portland State	7	–	11	.389	15	–	16	.484
Northern Colorado*	7	–	11	.389	11	–	18	.379
Northern Arizona	6	–	12	.333	9	–	23	.281
Southern Utah	3	–	15	.167	6	–	27	.182
Idaho State	3	–	15	.167	5	–	26	.161
† Conference tournament winner

The 2017 Big Sky Conference men's basketball tournament was the 42nd edition of the postseason tournament for the Big Sky Conference, held March 7–11 at the Reno Events Center in Reno, Nevada.

In the final, regular season champion North Dakota defeated third-seed Weber State 93–89 in overtime to earn the conference's automatic bid to the NCAA tournament. It was North Dakota's first NCAA tournament as a Division I team, after multiple appearances in the Division II tourney.

On October 8, 2016, Northern Colorado self-imposed a post-season ban amid an ongoing NCAA investigation into program violations, and did not participate.

== Seeds ==
Only 11 of the 12 teams in the conference participated in the tournament due to Northern Colorado's self-imposed ban. Teams were seeded by conference record, with a tiebreaker system used to seed teams with identical conference records. The top five teams received a first round bye.

Seed	School	Conference	Tiebreaker 1	Tiebreaker 2
1	North Dakota	14–4		
2	Eastern Washington	13–5		
3	Weber State	12–6	0–2 vs UND	1–1 vs EWU
4	Idaho	12–6	0–1 vs UND	0–2 vs EWU
5	Montana	11–7	1–0 vs UND	
6	Montana State	11–7	0–1 vs UND	
7	Sacramento State	9–9		
8	Portland State	7–11		
9	Northern Arizona	6–12		
10	Idaho State	3–15	1–0 vs SUU	
11	Southern Utah	3-15	0–1 vs ISU	

== Schedule ==
Session	Game	Time*	Matchup	Score	Television	Attendance
First Round – Tuesday, March 7
1	1	2:35 PM	No. 8 Portland State vs. No. 9 Northern Arizona	80–67	Watch; Big Sky	1,507
1	2	5:35 PM	No. 7 Sacramento State vs. No. 10 Idaho State	91–76	Watch; Big Sky	1,507
1	3	8:05 PM	No. 6 Montana State vs. No. 11 Southern Utah	109–105^{3OT}	Watch; Big Sky	1,507
Quarterfinals – Thursday, March 9
2	4	12:05 PM	No. 1 North Dakota vs. No. 8 Portland State	95–72	Watch; Big Sky	1,762
2	5	2:35 PM	No. 4 Idaho vs. No. 5 Montana	81–77	Watch; Big Sky	1,762
3	6	5:35 PM	No. 2 Eastern Washington vs. No. 7 Sacramento State	89–70	Watch; Big Sky	1,903
3	7	8:05 PM	No. 3 Weber State vs. No. 11 Southern Utah	90–70	Watch; Big Sky	1,903
Semifinals – Friday, March 10
4	8	5:35 PM	No. 1 North Dakota vs. No. 4 Idaho	69–64	Watch; Big Sky	2,003
4	9	8:05 PM	No. 2 Eastern Washington vs. No. 3 Weber State	80–72	Watch; Big Sky	2,003
Championship Game – Saturday, March 11
5	10	5:30 PM	No. 1 North Dakota vs. No. 3 Weber State	93–89^{OT}	ESPNU	2,025
*Game times in PST. Rankings denote tournament seeding

== Bracket ==
First round Tuesday, March 7
8	Portland State	80
9	Northern Arizona	67
7	Sacramento State	91
10	Idaho State	76
6	Montana State	105
11	Southern Utah	109***

Quarterfinals; Thursday, March 9
1	North Dakota	95
8	Portland State	72
4	Idaho	81
5	Montana	77
2	Eastern Washington	89
7	Sacramento State	70
3	Weber State	90
11	Southern Utah	70

Semifinals; Friday, March 10
1	North Dakota	69
4	Idaho	64
2	Eastern Washington	72
3	Weber State	80

Championship game Saturday, March 11
1	North Dakota	93*
3	Weber State	89

* denotes overtime period

== NCAA tournament ==
The Fighting Hawks received the automatic bid to the NCAA tournament for the very first time; no other Big Sky members were invited to the tournament or the NIT. North Dakota was seeded fifteenth in the West regional and lost 100–82 to Arizona in the first round in Salt Lake City. It was the eleventh consecutive year that the Big Sky representative lost in the first round.
