= Global Sports Classic =

Basketball tournament held in Las Vegas, Nevada

- Sport: Basketball
- Founded: 2013
- Folded: 2016
- No. of teams: 8
- Venues: Cox Pavilion (2015); Thomas & Mack Center (2016)
- Last champion: Grand Canyon
- Most titles: Grand Canyon (1)
- Broadcaster: YouTube

The Global Sports Classic was a college basketball tournament held between November and December in Las Vegas, Nevada. The 2015 tournament was played in December 21 and 22 at Cox Pavilion, and the 2016 tournament was played November 25 and 26 at the Thomas & Mack Center. Each team played four games in the Classic – the first two at on-campus sites and the final two rounds in Las Vegas.

== Brackets ==
* – Denotes overtime period

=== 2016 ===
Third Round; November 25
Washington	86
Western Kentucky	47
TCU	63
UNLV	59

Championship Round; November 26
Washington	80
TCU	93
3rd Place Game
Western Kentucky	61
UNLV	71

Third Round; November 25
Jacksonville State	61
Cal State Fullerton	38
Alabama State	57
Northern Arizona	71

Championship Round; November 26
Jacksonville State	76
Northern Arizona	63
3rd Place Game
Cal State Fullerton	67
Alabama State	76

=== 2015 ===
Third Round; December 21
Houston	68
Grand Canyon	79
Wyoming	82
Marshall	90

Championship Round; December 22
Grand Canyon	85
Marshall	81
3rd Place Game
Houston	'89***
Wyoming	84

Third Round; December 21
Eastern Illinois	68
Omaha	80
Southern	68
North Carolina Central	63

Championship Round; December 22
Omaha	74
Southern	53
3rd Place Game
Eastern Illinois	52
North Carolina Central	57
