= 2016–17 Montana Grizzlies basketball team =

American college basketball season

2016–17 Montana Grizzlies basketball
- Conference: Big Sky Conference
- Record: 16–16 (11–7 Big Sky)
- Head coach: Travis DeCuire (3rd season)
- Assistant coaches: Chris Cobb; Rachi Wortham; Marlon Stewart
- Home arena: Dahlberg Arena

2016–17 Big Sky men's basketball standings
	Conf.				Overall
Team	W		L	PCT	W		L	PCT
North Dakota †	14	–	4	.778	22	–	10	.688
Eastern Washington	13	–	5	.722	22	–	12	.647
Idaho	12	–	6	.667	19	–	14	.576
Weber State	12	–	6	.667	20	–	14	.588
Montana	11	–	7	.611	16	–	16	.500
Montana State	11	–	7	.611	16	–	16	.500
Sacramento State	9	–	9	.500	13	–	18	.419
Portland State	7	–	11	.389	15	–	16	.484
Northern Colorado*	7	–	11	.389	11	–	18	.379
Northern Arizona	6	–	12	.333	9	–	23	.281
Southern Utah	3	–	15	.167	6	–	27	.182
Idaho State	3	–	15	.167	5	–	26	.161
† Conference tournament winner

The 2016–17 Montana Grizzlies basketball team represented the University of Montana during the 2016–17 NCAA Division I men's basketball season. The Grizzlies, led by third-year head coach Travis DeCuire, played their home games at Dahlberg Arena in Missoula, Montana as members of the Big Sky Conference. They finished the season 16–16, 11–7 in Big Sky play to finish in a tie for fifth place. As the No. 5 seed in the Big Sky tournament, they lost to Idaho in the quarterfinals.

== Previous season ==
The Grizzlies finished the 2015–16 season 21–12, 14–4 in Big Sky play to finish in second place. They defeated Sacramento State and Idaho to advance to the Championship game of the Big Sky tournament where they lost to Weber State. They were invited to the College Basketball Invitational where they lost in the first round to Nevada.

== Offseason ==
=== Departures ===
Name	Number	Pos.	Height	Weight	Year	Hometown	Notes
Riley Bradshaw	2	G	6'2"	180	RS Junior	Corvallis, Montana	Transferred
Martin Breunig	12	F	6'8"	210	RS Senior	Leverkusen, Germany	Graduated
Zachary Camel	22	G	6'0"	166	Freshman	Polson, Montana	Walk-on; left the team for personal reasons
Bryden Boehning	35	C	6'10"	230	RS Freshman	Glendive, Montana	Transferred to Rocky Mountain College

=== Incoming transfers ===
Name	Number	Pos.	Height	Weight	Year	Hometown	Previous School
Jamar Akoh	12	F	6'7"	240	Junior	Rancho Cucamonga, California	Transferred from Cal State Fullerton. Under NCAA transfer rules, Akoh will have to sit out for the 2016–17 season. Will have two years of remaining eligibility.
Donaven Dorsey	42	G	6'5"	210	Junior	Lacey, Washington	Transferred from Washington. Under NCAA transfer rules, Dorsey will have to sit out for the 2016–17 season. Will have two years of remaining eligibility.

=== 2016 recruiting class ===
College recruiting information
Name	Hometown	School	Height	Weight	Commit date
Sayeed Pridgett #74 PG	El Cerrito, California	El Cerrito High School	6 ft 4 in (1.93 m)	175 lb (79 kg)	Sep 7, 2015
Sayeed Pridgett #74 PG	Recruit ratings: Scout: Rivals: (69)				
Alphonso Anderson #77 PF	Seattle, Washington	Garfield High School	6 ft 6 in (1.98 m)	205 lb (93 kg)	Oct 11, 2015
Alphonso Anderson #77 PF	Recruit ratings: Scout: Rivals: (68)				
Overall recruit ranking:
Note: In many cases, Scout, Rivals, 247Sports, On3, and ESPN may conflict in their listings of height and weight.; In these cases, the average was taken. ESPN grades are on a 100-point scale.; Sources: "2016 Team Ranking". Rivals.

=== 2017 recruiting class ===
College recruiting information (2017)
Name	Hometown	School	Height	Weight	Commit date
Timmy Falls #63 SG	Dublin, California	Dublin High School	6 ft 2 in (1.88 m)	170 lb (77 kg)	Feb 20, 2016
Timmy Falls #63 SG	Recruit ratings: Scout: Rivals: (69)				
Overall recruit ranking:
Note: In many cases, Scout, Rivals, 247Sports, On3, and ESPN may conflict in their listings of height and weight.; In these cases, the average was taken. ESPN grades are on a 100-point scale.; Sources: "2017 Team Ranking". Rivals.

== Roster ==
2016–17 Montana Grizzlies men's basketball team
Players
Coaches

Pos.	#	Name	Height	Weight	Year	Previous school	Hometown
G	0	Michael Oguine	6 ft 2 in (1.88 m)	171 lb (78 kg)	So	Chaminade Prep	Porter Ranch, California
G	1	Mario Dunn, Jr.	6 ft 0 in (1.83 m)	185 lb (84 kg)	Sr	Salesian	Oakland, California
G	4	Sayeed Pridgett	6 ft 5 in (1.96 m)	195 lb (88 kg)	Fr	El Cerrito	Oakland, California
G	5	Walter Wright	5 ft 10 in (1.78 m)	161 lb (73 kg)	Sr	Wilby; Snow College	Waterbury, Connecticut
F	10	Alphonso Anderson	6 ft 6 in (1.98 m)	218 lb (99 kg)	Fr	Garfield	Tacoma, Washington
F	12	Jamar Akoh (I) (redshirt)	6 ft 8 in (2.03 m)	253 lb (115 kg)	Jr	Los Osos HS; Cal State Fullerton	Rancho Cucamonga, California
G	14	Ahmaad Rorie	6 ft 1 in (1.85 m)	175 lb (79 kg)	RS So	Lincoln; Oregon	Tacoma, Washington
G	15	Trevor Spoja (W)	6 ft 3 in (1.91 m)	164 lb (74 kg)	RS Fr	Billings West	Billings, Montana
F	20	Fabijan Krslovic	6 ft 8 in (2.03 m)	239 lb (108 kg)	Jr	St Aloysius	New South Wales, Australia
G	24	Bobby Moorehead	6 ft 7 in (2.01 m)	182 lb (83 kg)	So	Stadium	Tacoma, Washington
F	30	Gavin DeJong (W)	6 ft 6 in (1.98 m)	215 lb (98 kg)	RS So	Manhattan	Manhattan, Montana
F	31	Jack Lopez	6 ft 5 in (1.96 m)	208 lb (94 kg)	Sr	Jannali	Bankstown, Australia
G	32	Aaron Misipeka-Ward (W)	6 ft 2 in (1.88 m)	198 lb (90 kg)	Sr	Florence-Carlton	Florence, Montana
F	33	Jared Samuelson	6 ft 7 in (2.01 m)	213 lb (97 kg)	RS Fr	Billings West	Billings, Montana
G	34	Brandon Gfeller	6 ft 4 in (1.93 m)	189 lb (86 kg)	Sr	Colfax	Colfax, Washington
F	42	Donaven Dorsey (I) (redshirt)	6 ft 7 in (2.01 m)	214 lb (97 kg)	Jr	Timberline; Washington	Lacey, Washington

Head coach

- Travis DeCuire (Montana)

Assistant coach(es)

- Chris Cobb (Menlo)
- Rachi Wortham (Eastern Washington)
- Marlon Stewart (Washington State)

Legend

- (C) Team captain
- (S) Suspended
- (I) Ineligible
- (W) Walk-on
- Injured
- Current redshirt

Roster

== Schedule and results ==
Date time, TV	Rank^{#}	Opponent^{#}	Result	Record	Site (attendance) city, state
Exhibition
11/02/2016*; 7:00 pm		Whitworth	W 90–80		Dahlberg Arena (2,424); Missoula, Montana
Non-conference regular season
11/11/2016*; 9:00 pm, P12N		at USC	L 61–75	0–1	Galen Center (3,513); Los Angeles, California
11/14/2016*; 7:00 pm		Wyoming	L 72–73	0–2	Dahlberg Arena (3,318); Missoula, Montana
11/18/2016*; 4:00 pm, CBSSN		vs. NC State; Paradise Jam quarterfinals	L 72–85	0–3	Sports and Fitness Center (2,223); St. Thomas, VI
11/19/2016*; 4:00 pm		vs. Washington State; Paradise Jam consolation round	L 63–87	0–4	Sports and Fitness Center (1,831); St. Thomas, VI
11/21/2016*; 10:30 am		vs. Oral Roberts; Paradise Jam 7th place game	W 68–47	1–4	Sports and Fitness Center (224); St. Thomas, VI
11/24/2016*; 2:00 pm, SEC+		at Ole Miss	L 81–86	1–5	The Pavilion at Ole Miss (7,358); Oxford, Mississippi
11/27/2016*; 12:00 pm		at South Dakota	L 67–72	1–6	Sanford Coyote Sports Center (1,399); Vermillion, South Dakota
12/03/2016*; 7:00 pm		Milwaukee	W 75–69	2–6	Dahlberg Arena (3,369); Missoula, Montana
12/07/2016*; 7:00 pm		San Jose State	W 81–62	3–6	Dahlberg Arena (3,024); Missoula, Montana
12/10/2016*; 4:00 pm, MW Net		at Wyoming	L 83–85	3–7	Arena-Auditorium (4,749); Laramie, Wyoming
12/13/2016*; 8:00 pm, P12N		at No. 22 Oregon	L 67–81	3–8	Matthew Knight Arena (6,689); Eugene, Oregon
12/17/2016*; 6:00 pm		at UC Riverside	W 71–63	4–8	The SRC (299); Riverside, California
12/22/2016*; 7:00 pm		Pepperdine	W 71–70	5–8	Dahlberg Arena (3,476); Missoula, Montana
Big Sky regular season
12/29/2016; 7:00 pm		Idaho State	W 74–62	6–8 (1–0)	Dahlberg Arena (3,848); Missoula, Montana
12/31/2016; 2:00 pm		Weber State	L 81–84 ^{OT}	6–9 (1–1)	Dahlberg Arena (3,710); Missoula, Montana
01/05/2017; 8:00 pm		at Idaho	W 70–57	7–9 (2–1)	Cowan Spectrum (813); Moscow, Idaho
01/07/2017; 2:00 pm		at Eastern Washington	W 65–59	8–9 (3–1)	Reese Court (2,107); Cheney, Washington
01/12/2017; 7:00 pm		Northern Colorado	W 89–68	9–9 (4–1)	Dahlberg Arena (3,438); Missoula, Montana
01/14/2017; 7:00 pm		North Dakota	W 76–70	10–9 (5–1)	Dahlberg Arena (3,719); Missoula, Montana
01/19/2017; 8:00 pm		at Portland State	L 79–88	10–10 (5–2)	Peter Stott Center (728); Portland, Oregon
01/21/2017; 8:00 pm		at Sacramento State	L 83–92	10–11 (5–3)	Hornets Nest (1,112); Sacramento, California
01/26/2017; 7:00 pm		Eastern Washington	L 60–72	10–12 (5–4)	Dahlberg Arena (3,637); Missoula, Montana
01/28/2017; 7:00 pm, SWX Montana		Idaho	L 77–85 ^{OT}	10–13 (5–5)	Dahlberg Arena (3,935); Missoula, Montana
02/04/2017; 7:00 pm, Cowles		Montana State	W 90–84	11–13 (6–5)	Dahlberg Arena (5,546); Missoula, Montana
02/09/2017; 6:30 pm		at Southern Utah	W 70–55	12–13 (7–5)	Centrum Arena (1,923); Cedar City, Utah
02/11/2017; 7:30 pm		at Northern Arizona	W 76–59	13–13 (8–5)	Walkup Skydome (1,453); Flagstaff, Arizona
02/16/2017; 7:00 pm		Sacramento State	L 65–67	13–14 (8–6)	Dahlberg Arena (4,023); Missoula, Montana
02/18/2017; 7:00 pm		Portland State	W 85–82	14–14 (9–6)	Dahlberg Arena (4,465); Missoula, Montana
02/25/2017; 7:00 pm, Cowles		at Montana State	L 69–78	14–15 (9–7)	Brick Breeden Fieldhouse (6,772); Bozeman, Montana
03/02/2017; 7:00 pm		at Weber State	W 78–74	15–15 (10–7)	Dee Events Center (6,431); Ogden, Utah
03/04/2017; 7:00 pm		at Idaho State	W 95–76	16–15 (11–7)	Holt Arena (1,795); Pocatello, Idaho
Big Sky tournament
03/092017; 2:35 pm	(5)	vs. (4) Idaho; Quarterfinals	L 77–81	16–16	Reno Events Center (1,762); Reno, Nevada
*Non-conference game. ^{#}Rankings from AP Poll. (#) Tournament seedings in parentheses. All times are in Mountain Time..

== See also ==
2016–17 Montana Lady Griz basketball team
