= 2016–17 Idaho State Bengals men's basketball team =

American college basketball season

2016–17 Idaho State Bengals men's basketball
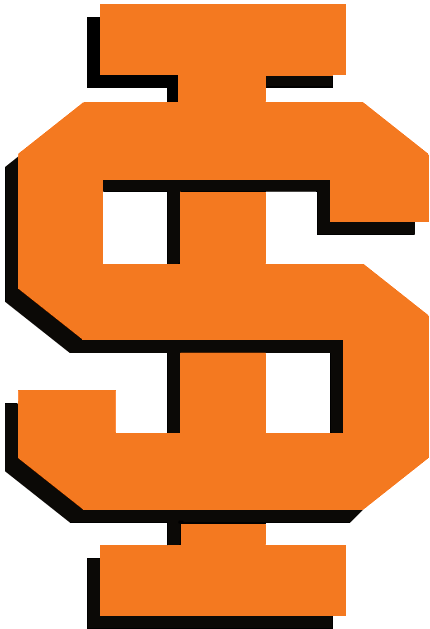
- Conference: Big Sky Conference
- Record: 5–26 (3–15 Big Sky)
- Head coach: Bill Evans (5th season)
- Assistant coaches: Andy Ward; Jay Collins; Tim Walsh
- Home arena: Holt Arena; Reed Gym

2016–17 Big Sky men's basketball standings
	Conf.				Overall
Team	W		L	PCT	W		L	PCT
North Dakota †	14	–	4	.778	22	–	10	.688
Eastern Washington	13	–	5	.722	22	–	12	.647
Idaho	12	–	6	.667	19	–	14	.576
Weber State	12	–	6	.667	20	–	14	.588
Montana	11	–	7	.611	16	–	16	.500
Montana State	11	–	7	.611	16	–	16	.500
Sacramento State	9	–	9	.500	13	–	18	.419
Portland State	7	–	11	.389	15	–	16	.484
Northern Colorado*	7	–	11	.389	11	–	18	.379
Northern Arizona	6	–	12	.333	9	–	23	.281
Southern Utah	3	–	15	.167	6	–	27	.182
Idaho State	3	–	15	.167	5	–	26	.161
† Conference tournament winner

The 2016–17 Idaho State Bengals men's basketball team represented Idaho State University during the 2016–17 NCAA Division I men's basketball season. The Bengals, led by fifth-year head coach Bill Evans, played their home games at Holt Arena and Reed Gym in Pocatello, Idaho and were members of the Big Sky Conference. They finished the season 5–26, 3–15 in Big Sky play to finish in a tie for 11th place. As the No. 10 seed in the Big Sky tournament, they lost in the first round to Sacramento State.

== Previous season ==
The Bengals finished the 2015–16 season 16–15, 11–7 in Big Sky play to finish in fourth place. They lost in the quarterfinals of the Big Sky tournament to North Dakota.

== Offseason ==
=== Departures ===
Name	Number	Pos.	Height	Weight	Year	Hometown	Notes
Clint Nwosuh	0	G	6'2"	190	Junior	Houston, TX	Graduate transferred to Pikeville
Ben Wilson	5	G	6'6"	207	RS Senior	Bardon, Australia	Graduated
Evann Hall	10	G	6'4"	210	Senior	Thousand Oaks, CA	Graduated
Ali Faruq-Bey	22	G	6'2"	175	Sophomore	Chicago, IL	Transferred to Western Oregon
Spencer Nicolds	23	F	6'7"	190	Sophomore	Gilbert, AZ	Transferred
Justin Smith	33	G	6'5"	200	Junior	Colorado Springs, CO	Transferred to Colorado–Colorado Springs

=== Incoming transfers ===
Name	Number	Pos.	Height	Weight	Year	Hometown	Previous School
Hayes Garrity	0	G	6'1"	185	RS Senior	Beaverton, OR	Transferred from Utah Valley. Will be eligible to play immediately since Garrity graduated from Utah Valley.
Robert Jones III	5	F	6'7"	190	Junior	Denver, CO	Junior college transferred from Northeastern JC

=== 2016 recruiting class ===
College recruiting information
Name	Hometown	School	Height	Weight	Commit date
Lyle Sutton; PG	Rexburg, ID	Madison High School	6 ft 2 in (1.88 m)	N/A	Jun 1, 2016
Lyle Sutton; PG	Recruit ratings: Scout: Rivals: (0)				
Balint Moscan; SF	Hungary		6 ft 5 in (1.96 m)	N/A	Aug 5, 2016
Balint Moscan; SF	Recruit ratings: Scout: Rivals: (0)				
Clark Wilkinson; PF	Pocatello, ID	Highland High School	6 ft 7 in (2.01 m)	N/A	Jun 9, 2013
Clark Wilkinson; PF	Recruit ratings: Scout: Rivals: (0)				
Overall recruit ranking:
Note: In many cases, Scout, Rivals, 247Sports, On3, and ESPN may conflict in their listings of height and weight.; In these cases, the average was taken. ESPN grades are on a 100-point scale.; Sources: "2016 Team Ranking". Rivals.

== Roster ==
2016–17 Idaho State Bengals men's basketball team
Players
Coaches

Pos.	#	Name	Height	Weight	Year	Previous school	Hometown
G	0	Hayes Garrity	6 ft 2 in (1.88 m)	175 lb (79 kg)	RS Sr	Westview HS; Utah Valley	Beaverton, OR
G	1	Geno Luzcando	6 ft 3 in (1.91 m)	200 lb (91 kg)	Jr	Wasatch Academy HS	Estación Central, Chile
G	3	Ethan Telfair	6 ft 0 in (1.83 m)	175 lb (79 kg)	Sr	Lincoln HS; Redlands CC	Coney Island, NY
F	5	Robert Jones III	6 ft 8 in (2.03 m)	195 lb (88 kg)	RS Jr	Cherokee Trail HS; Northeastern JC	Denver, CO
G	10	Lyle Sutton	6 ft 2 in (1.88 m)	185 lb (84 kg)	Fr	Madison HS	Rexburg, ID
G	11	Erik Nakken	6 ft 3 in (1.91 m)	195 lb (88 kg)	RS Jr	Cedar HS	Cedar City, UT
C	13	Novak Topalovic	7 ft 0 in (2.13 m)	230 lb (104 kg)	RS So	Santa Margarita Catholic HS	Niš, Serbia
G	15	Brandon Boyd	5 ft 11 in (1.8 m)	170 lb (77 kg)	So	Middlebrooks Academy	Los Angeles, CA
F	22	Clark Wilkinson	6 ft 7 in (2.01 m)	195 lb (88 kg)	Fr	Highland HS	Pocatello, ID
G	23	Houston Wahlen (W)	6 ft 2 in (1.88 m)	175 lb (79 kg)	Fr	Aberdeen HS	Aberdeen, ID
F	24	Stephen Lennox	6 ft 9 in (2.06 m)	220 lb (100 kg)	So	Lovington HS	Lovington, NM
G	25	Gary Chivichyan	6 ft 4 in (1.93 m)	200 lb (91 kg)	So	Middlebrooks Academy	Los Angeles, CA
F	32	Balint Moscan	6 ft 3 in (1.91 m)	182 lb (83 kg)	Fr	Kempelen Farkas Grammar School	Budapest, Hungary
G	33	Keshawn Liggins (W)	6 ft 5 in (1.96 m)	195 lb (88 kg)	Jr	Middleton HS; Big Ben CC	Middleton, ID
F	35	Kyle Ingram	6 ft 8 in (2.03 m)	220 lb (100 kg)	Sr	JSerra Catholic HS; Fresno City College	Pasadena, CA

Head coach

- Bill Evans (Southern Utah)

Assistant coach(es)

- Andy Ward (Southern Utah)
- Jay Collins (Southern Utah)
- Tim Walsh (Western Illinois)

Legend

- (C) Team captain
- (S) Suspended
- (I) Ineligible
- (W) Walk-on
- Injured
- Current redshirt

Roster

== Schedule and results ==
Date time, TV	Rank^{#}	Opponent^{#}	Result	Record	Site (attendance) city, state
Exhibition
11/02/2016*; 7:30 pm		Southern Virginia	W 89–55		Reed Gym; Pocatello, ID
Non-conference regular season
11/11/2016*; 8:00 pm, RTNW		at New Mexico	L 70–81	0–1	The Pit (11,293); Albuquerque, NM
11/16/2016*; 7:00 pm		at Utah Valley	L 73–82	0–2	UCCU Center (6,117); Orem, UT
11/19/2016*; 7:00 pm		at Utah State; Cancún Challenge	L 51–85	0–3	Smith Spectrum (8,923); Logan, UT
11/22/2016*; 1:00 pm		vs. Eastern Kentucky; Cancún Challenge	L 82–91 ^{OT}	0–4	Hard Rock Hotel Riviera Maya (1,610); Cancún, Mexico
11/23/2016*; 10:30 am		vs. NJIT; Cancún Challenge	L 67–71	0–5	Hard Rock Hotel Riviera Maya (1,610); Cancún, Mexico
11/25/2016*; 2:00 pm, FSSW		at Texas Tech; Cancún Challenge	L 58–91	0–6	United Supermarkets Arena (5,964); Lubbock, TX
11/29/2016*; 7:05 pm		Lamar	W 77–60	1–6	Reed Gym (1,534); Pocatello, ID
12/03/2016*; 5:00 pm		at Cal State Northridge	L 76–79	1–7	Matadome (1,086); Northridge, CA
12/07/2016*; 5:00 pm, ESPN3		at No. 17 Wisconsin	L 44–78	1–8	Kohl Center (17,287); Madison, WI
12/10/2016*; 7:05 pm		Bristol (CA) (non-NCAA affiliated school, does not count in record)	W 80–61		Holt Arena (1,403); Pocatello, ID
12/16/2016*; 6:05 pm		Montana Tech	W 76–46	2–8	Reed Gym (300); Pocatello, ID
12/18/2016*; 4:30 pm		at Boise State	L 59–82	2–9	Taco Bell Arena (4,303); Boise, ID
12/20/2016*; 7:00 pm, BYUtv		at BYU	L 58–84	2–10	Marriott Center (13,553); Provo, UT
Big Sky regular season
12/29/2016; 7:05 pm		at Montana	L 62–74	2–11 (0–1)	Dahlberg Arena (3,848); Missoula, MT
12/31/2016; 4:00 pm		at Montana State	L 63–80	2–12 (0–2)	Brick Breeden Fieldhouse (2,138); Bozeman, MT
01/07/2017; 7:05 pm		Weber State; Suspended (roof leak), rescheduled for 01/25/2017			Holt Arena; Pocatello, ID
01/12/2017; 7:05 pm		Eastern Washington	L 85–92	2–13 (0–3)	Reed Gym (1,404); Pocatello, ID
01/14/2017; 7:05 pm		Idaho	L 62–77	2–14 (0–4)	Reed Gym (1,754); Pocatello, ID
01/19/2017; 7:00 pm		at Northern Colorado	W 73–69	3–14 (1–4)	Bank of Colorado Arena (1,865); Greeley, CO
01/21/2017; 1:00 pm		at North Dakota	L 64–89	3–15 (1–5)	Betty Engelstad Sioux Center (2,570); Grand Forks, ND
01/25/2017; 7:00 pm		Weber State	L 73–85	3–16 (1–6)	Reed Gym (1,203); Pocatello, ID
01/27/2017; 7:00 pm		at Weber State	L 74–96	3–17 (1–7)	Dee Events Center (7,018); Ogden, UT
02/02/2017; 7:05 pm		Northern Arizona	W 91–90 ^{OT}	4–17 (2–7)	Holt Arena (1,819); Pocatello, ID
02/04/2017; 7:05 pm		Southern Utah	W 94–68	5–17 (3–7)	Holt Arena (1,721); Pocatello, ID
02/09/2017; 8:00 pm		at Portland State	L 69–74	5–18 (3–8)	Peter Stott Center (522); Portland, OR
02/11/2017; 8:00 pm		at Sacramento State	L 63–75	5–19 (3–9)	Hornets Nest (975); Sacramento, CA
02/16/2017; 7:05 pm		North Dakota	W 77–61	5–20 (3–10)	Reed Gym (1,415); Pocatello, ID
02/18/2017; 7:05 pm		Northern Colorado	L 81–87	5–21 (3–11)	Reed Gym (1,436); Pocatello, ID
02/23/2017; 8:00 pm		at Idaho	L 61–69	5–22 (3–12)	Cowan Spectrum (1,043); Moscow, ID
02/25/2017; 3:00 pm		at Eastern Washington	L 77–89	5–23 (3–13)	Reese Court (2,025); Cheney, WA
03/02/2017; 7:05 pm		Montana State	L 68–79	5–24 (3–14)	Holt Arena; Pocatello, ID
03/04/2017; 7:05 pm		Montana	L 76–95	5–25 (3–15)	Holt Arena (1,795); Pocatello, ID
Big Sky tournament
03/07/2017; 5:35 pm	(10)	vs. (7) Sacramento State; First Round	L 76–91	5–26	Reno Events Center (1,507); Reno, NV
*Non-conference game. ^{#}Rankings from AP Poll. (#) Tournament seedings in parentheses. All times are in Mountain Time; Source.
