= 2016–17 Montana State Bobcats men's basketball team =

American college basketball season

2016–17 Montana State Bobcats men's basketball
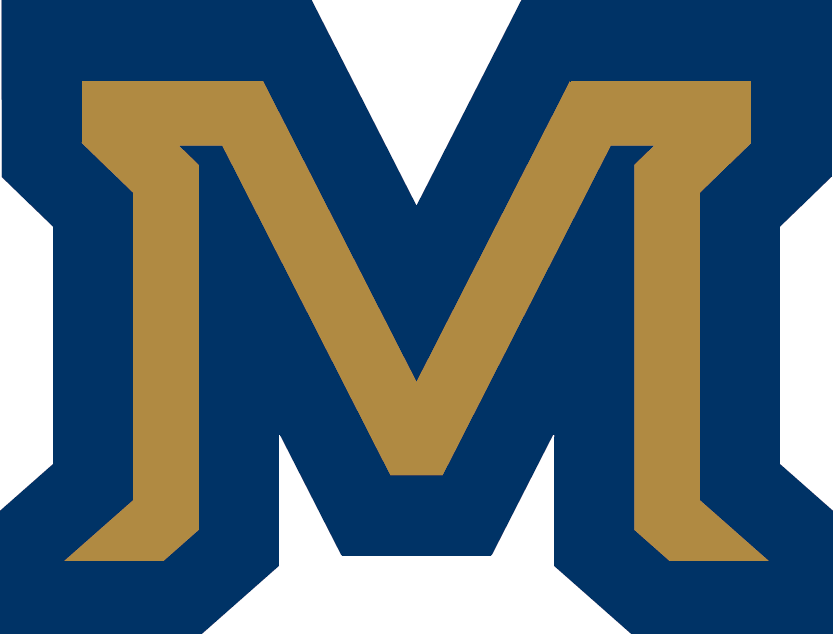
- Conference: Big Sky Conference
- Record: 16–16 (11–7 Big Sky)
- Head coach: Brian Fish (3rd season)
- Assistant coaches: Chris Haslam; Brandon Lincoln; Eric Jackson
- Home arena: Brick Breeden Fieldhouse

2016–17 Big Sky men's basketball standings
	Conf.				Overall
Team	W		L	PCT	W		L	PCT
North Dakota †	14	–	4	.778	22	–	10	.688
Eastern Washington	13	–	5	.722	22	–	12	.647
Idaho	12	–	6	.667	19	–	14	.576
Weber State	12	–	6	.667	20	–	14	.588
Montana	11	–	7	.611	16	–	16	.500
Montana State	11	–	7	.611	16	–	16	.500
Sacramento State	9	–	9	.500	13	–	18	.419
Portland State	7	–	11	.389	15	–	16	.484
Northern Colorado*	7	–	11	.389	11	–	18	.379
Northern Arizona	6	–	12	.333	9	–	23	.281
Southern Utah	3	–	15	.167	6	–	27	.182
Idaho State	3	–	15	.167	5	–	26	.161
† Conference tournament winner

The 2016–17 Montana State Bobcats men's basketball team represented Montana State University during the 2016–17 NCAA Division I men's basketball season. The Bobcats, led by third-year head coach Brian Fish, played their home games at Brick Breeden Fieldhouse in Bozeman, Montana as members of the Big Sky Conference. They finished the season 16–16, 11–7 in Big Sky play, to finish in a tie for fifth place. As the No. 6 seed in the Big Sky tournament, they lost in the first round to Southern Utah.

== Previous season ==
The Bobcats finished the 2015–16 season 14–17, 9–9 in Big Sky play, to finish in seventh place. They lost in the first round of the Big Sky tournament to Sacramento State.

== Offseason ==
=== Departures ===
Name	Number	Pos.	Height	Weight	Year	Hometown	Notes
Stephan Holm	1	G	6' 3"	175	Junior	Riverton, UT	Left the team for personal reasons
Nahjee Mathlock	10	G	5' 11"	185	Junior	Las Vegas, NV	Graduate transferred to Alaska–Fairbanks
Tyson Kanseyo	11	F	6' 8"	220	Sophomore	Malden, Netherlands	Transferred to Chaminade
Marcus Colbert	22	G	5' 11"	180	Senior	Post Falls, ID	Graduated
Shikei Blake	25	C	6' 7"	225	Junior	Wilmington, DE	Transferred
Quinn Price	33	F	6' 9"	205	Sophomore	Casa Grande, AZ	Retired from basketball due to a knee injury
Danny Robison	34	F	6' 8"	225	Senior	Billings, MT	Graduated

=== Incoming transfers ===
Name	Number	Pos.	Height	Weight	Year	Hometown	Previous school
Joe Mvuezolo Jr.	1	F	6' 6"	185	Junior	London, England	Junior college transferred from Miami Dade College
Keljin Blevins	2	G	6' 4"	200	Junior	Hot Springs, AR	Transferred from Southern Utah. Under NCAA transfer rules, Blevins will have to sit out for the 2016–17 season. Will have two years of remaining eligibility.
Devonte Klines	10	G	6' 2"	190	Sophomore	Rancho Santa Margarita, CA	Junior college transferred from Saddleback College
Konner Frey	11	G	6' 5"	210	Senior	Bountiful, UT	Transferred from Utah Valley. Under NCAA transfer rules, Frey will have to sit out for the 2016–17 season. Will have one year of remaining eligibility.
Benson Osayande	21	F	6' 9"	204	Junior	Elk Grove, CA	Junior college transferred from Gillette College

=== 2016 incoming recruits ===
College recruiting information
Name	Hometown	School	Height	Weight	Commit date
Devin Kirby #72 PF	Chandler, AZ	Basha High School	6 ft 9 in (2.06 m)	195 lb (88 kg)	Sep 22, 2015
Devin Kirby #72 PF	Recruit ratings: Scout: Rivals: (69)				
Harald Frey #72 PF	Oslo, Norway	WANG Toppidrett	6 ft 2 in (1.88 m)	N/A	Sep 15, 2015
Harald Frey #72 PF	Recruit ratings: Scout: Rivals: (0)				
Overall recruit ranking:
Note: In many cases, Scout, Rivals, 247Sports, On3, and ESPN may conflict in their listings of height and weight.; In these cases, the average was taken. ESPN grades are on a 100-point scale.; Sources: "2016 Team Ranking". Rivals.

== Roster ==
2016–17 Montana State Bobcats men's basketball team
Players
Coaches

Pos.	#	Name	Height	Weight	Year	Previous school	Hometown
G	0	Zach Green	6 ft 4 in (1.93 m)	195 lb (88 kg)	Jr	Mesquite	Gilbert, AZ
F	1	Joe Jr. Mvuezolo	6 ft 6 in (1.98 m)	180 lb (82 kg)	Jr	Barking Abby; Miami Dade CC	London, England
F	2	Keljin Blevins (I) (redshirt)	6 ft 6 in (1.98 m)	200 lb (91 kg)	Jr	Bishop O'Connell; Southern Miss	Hot Springs, AR
G	3	Tyler Hall	6 ft 4 in (1.93 m)	175 lb (79 kg)	So	Rock Island	Rock Island, IL
F	4	Sam Neumann	6 ft 7 in (2.01 m)	200 lb (91 kg)	So	Cretin-Durham Hall	St. Paul, MN
G	5	Harald Frey	6 ft 1 in (1.85 m)	150 lb (68 kg)	Fr	Wang Sports Academy	Oslo, Norway
G	10	Devonte Klines	6 ft 2 in (1.88 m)	185 lb (84 kg)	So	Santa Margarita; Saddleback College	Rancho Santa Margarita, CA
F	13	Sarp Gobeloglu	6 ft 10 in (2.08 m)	205 lb (93 kg)	Sr	FMV Igile; Gillette College	Ankara, Turkey
G	15	Mandrell Worthy	6 ft 2 in (1.88 m)	180 lb (82 kg)	RS Fr	Eastside Catholic	Federal Way, WA
F	21	Benson Osayande	6 ft 9 in (2.06 m)	200 lb (91 kg)	Jr	Franklin; Casper College	Elk Grove, CA
G	22	Konner Frey (I) (redshirt)	6 ft 6 in (1.98 m)	200 lb (91 kg)	Sr	Viewmont; Utah Valley	Bountiful, UT
G	23	Dallas Lussier	6 ft 1 in (1.85 m)	190 lb (86 kg)	Jr	Park; Little Big Horn CC	Livingston, MT
G	24	Quinton Everett	6 ft 3 in (1.91 m)	195 lb (88 kg)	Sr	Lakeland; Gillette College	Lakeland, FL
G	30	Cooper Olson (W)	6 ft 1 in (1.85 m)	170 lb (77 kg)	RS Fr	Westby	Westby, MT
C	31	Devin Kirby	6 ft 10 in (2.08 m)	215 lb (98 kg)	Fr	Basha	Chandler, AZ

Head coach

- Brian Fish (Marshall)

Assistant coach(es)

- Chris Haslam (Wyoming)
- Brandon Lincoln (Oregon)
- Eric Jackson (Green Bay)

Legend

- (C) Team captain
- (S) Suspended
- (I) Ineligible
- (W) Walk-on
- Injured
- Current redshirt

Roster
Last update: June 26, 2025

== Schedule and results ==
Date time, TV	Rank^{#}	Opponent^{#}	Result	Record	Site (attendance) city, state
Exhibition
November 4, 2016*; 7:00 p.m.		Montana Western	W 86–72		Brick Breeden Fieldhouse; Bozeman, MT
Non-conference regular season
November 11, 2016*; 5:00 p.m., P12N		at Washington State	L 65–69	0–1	Beasley Coliseum; Pullman, WA
November 14, 2016*; 7:00 p.m.		Louisiana–Lafayette; Hardwood Showcase	W 84–83	1–1	Brick Breeden Fieldhouse (2,395); Bozeman, MT
November 16, 2016*; 7:00 p.m.		Rocky Mountain (MT)	W 93–76	2–1	Brick Breeden Fieldhouse (2,262); Bozeman, MT
November 18, 2016*; 7:00 p.m.		James Madison; Hardwood Showcase	W 80–73	3–1	Brick Breeden Fieldhouse (2,539); Bozeman, MT
November 21, 2016*; 6:00 p.m.		at Rice; Hardwood Showcase	L 78–83	3–2	Tudor Fieldhouse (1,408); Houston, TX
November 26, 2016*; 2:00 p.m.		Delaware State; Hardwood Showcase	W 91–66	4–2	Brick Breeden Fieldhouse (2,307); Bozeman, MT
November 28, 2016*; 2:00 p.m.		Arizona Christian	W 93–73	5–2	Brick Breeden Fieldhouse (2,341); Bozeman, MT
December 1, 2016*; 7:00 p.m., P12N		at Utah	L 84–92	5–3	Jon M. Huntsman Center (10,548); Salt Lake City, UT
December 5, 2016*; 7:00 p.m.		Milwaukee	L 78–83	5–4	Brick Breeden Fieldhouse (2,212); Bozeman, MT
December 7, 2016*; 7:15 p.m.		at South Dakota	L 57–74	5–5	Sanford Coyote Sports Center (1,800); Vermillion, SD
December 10, 2016*; 6:00 p.m.		at Omaha	L 91–97	5–6	Baxter Arena (1,511); Omaha, NE
December 18, 2016*; 2:00 p.m.		South Dakota	L 68–80	5–7	Brick Breeden Fieldhouse (2,128); Bozeman, MT
December 21, 2016*; 7:00 p.m.		Central Michigan	L 103–106	5–8	Brick Breeden Fieldhouse (2,066); Bozeman, MT
Big Sky regular season
December 29, 2016; 7:00 p.m.		Weber State	L 75–87	5–9 (0–1)	Brick Breeden Fieldhouse (2,586); Bozeman, MT
December 31, 2016; 2:00 p.m.		Idaho State	W 80–63	6–9 (1–1)	Brick Breeden Fieldhouse (2,138); Bozeman, MT
January 5, 2017; 7:00 p.m.		at Eastern Washington	L 64–82	6–10 (1–2)	Reese Court (1,380); Cheney, WA
January 7, 2017; 8:00 p.m.		at Idaho	L 81–83 ^{OT}	6–11 (1–3)	Cowan Spectrum (1,114); Moscow, ID
January 12, 2017; 7:00 p.m., SWX MT		North Dakota	L 81–83 ^{OT}	6–12 (1–4)	Brick Breeden Fieldhouse (2,629); Bozeman, MT
January 14, 2017; 2:00 p.m.		Northern Colorado	W 68–53	7–12 (2–4)	Brick Breeden Fieldhouse (2,313); Bozeman, MT
January 19, 2017; 8:00 p.m.		at Sacramento State	W 74–65	8–12 (3–4)	Hornets Nest (751); Sacramento, CA
January 21, 2017; 8:00 p.m.		at Portland State	W 71–65	9–12 (4–4)	Peter Stott Center (705); Portland, OR
January 26, 2017; 7:00 p.m.		Idaho	W 94–91	10–12 (5–4)	Brick Breeden Fieldhouse (2,620); Bozeman, MT
January 28, 2017; 2:00 p.m.		Eastern Washington	W 91–90	11–12 (6–4)	Brick Breeden Fieldhouse (2,951); Bozeman, MT
February 4, 2017; 7:00 p.m., Cowles MT		at Montana	L 84–90	11–13 (6–5)	Dahlberg Arena (5,546); Missoula, MT
February 9, 2017; 6:30 p.m.		at Northern Arizona	L 63–69	11–14 (6–6)	Walkup Skydome; Flagstaff, AZ
February 11, 2017; 2:00 p.m.		at Southern Utah	W 83–78	12–14 (7–6)	Centrum Arena (1,761); Cedar City, UT
February 16, 2017; 7:00 p.m.		Portland State	W 92–90 ^{OT}	13–14 (8–6)	Brick Breeden Fieldhouse (2,471); Bozeman, MT
February 18, 2017; 2:00 p.m.		Sacramento State	W 62–59	14–14 (9–6)	Brick Breeden Fieldhouse (2,916); Bozeman, MT
February 25, 2017; 7:00 p.m., Cowles MT		Montana	W 78–58	15–14 (10–6)	Brick Breeden Fieldhouse (6,772); Bozeman, MT
March 2, 2017; 7:00 p.m.		at Idaho State	W 79–68	16–14 (11–6)	Holt Arena; Pocatello, ID
March 4, 2017; 7:00 p.m.		at Weber State	L 67–76	16–15 (11–7)	Dee Events Center (8,575); Ogden, UT
Big Sky tournament
March 7, 2017; 8:05 p.m.	(6)	vs. (11) Southern Utah; First round	L 105–109 ^{3OT}	16–16	Reno Events Center (1,507); Reno, NV
*Non-conference game. ^{#}Rankings from AP poll. (#) Tournament seedings in parentheses. All times are in Mountain Time.

== See also ==
- 2016–17 Montana State Bobcats women's basketball team
