= 2016–17 Portland State Vikings men's basketball team =

American college basketball season

2016–17 Portland State Vikings men's basketball
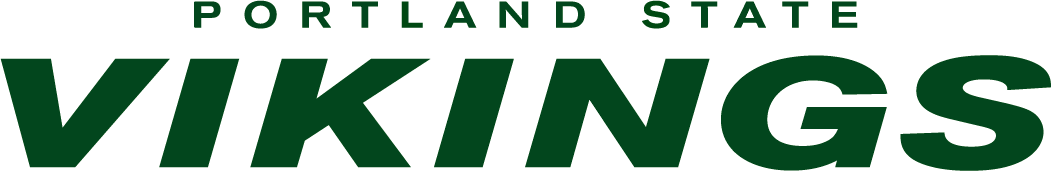
- Conference: Big Sky Conference
- Record: 15–16 (7–11 Big Sky)
- Head coach: Tyler Geving (8th season)
- Assistant coaches: Jeff Hironaka; Jase Coburn; Chris Skinkis
- Home arena: Peter Stott Center

2016–17 Big Sky men's basketball standings
	Conf.				Overall
Team	W		L	PCT	W		L	PCT
North Dakota †	14	–	4	.778	22	–	10	.688
Eastern Washington	13	–	5	.722	22	–	12	.647
Idaho	12	–	6	.667	19	–	14	.576
Weber State	12	–	6	.667	20	–	14	.588
Montana	11	–	7	.611	16	–	16	.500
Montana State	11	–	7	.611	16	–	16	.500
Sacramento State	9	–	9	.500	13	–	18	.419
Portland State	7	–	11	.389	15	–	16	.484
Northern Colorado*	7	–	11	.389	11	–	18	.379
Northern Arizona	6	–	12	.333	9	–	23	.281
Southern Utah	3	–	15	.167	6	–	27	.182
Idaho State	3	–	15	.167	5	–	26	.161
† Conference tournament winner

The 2016–17 Portland State Vikings men's basketball team represented Portland State University during the 2016–17 NCAA Division I men's basketball season. The Vikings, led by eighth-year head coach Tyler Geving, played their home games at the Peter Stott Center as members of the Big Sky Conference. They finished the season 15–16, 7–11 in Big Sky play to finish in a tie for eighth place. As the No. 8 seed in the Big Sky tournament, they defeated Northern Arizona in the first round before losing to top-seeded North Dakota in the quarterfinals.

On March 16, 2017, the Vikings announced that they had parted ways with head coach Tyler Geving after 8 seasons. The school then hired Santa Clara associate head coach and ex-Portland State assistant Barret Peery as the new head coach on April 10.

== Previous season ==
The Vikings finished the 2015–16 season 13–18, 8–10 in Big Sky play to finish in eighth place. They defeated Northern Colorado in the first round of the Big Sky tournament to advance to the Quarterfinals where they lost to Weber State.

== Departures ==
Name	Number	Pos.	Height	Weight	Year	Hometown	Notes
Isaiah Pineiro	0	F	6'6"	210	Sophomore	Auburn, CA	Transferred to San Diego
Collin Spickerman	2	C	6'8"	230	Senior	Portland, OR	Graduated
Armani Collins	3	G	6'5"	190	Freshman	San Francisco, CA	Transferred to City College of San Francisco
Cameron Forte	5	F	6'7"	220	RS Senior	Tempe, AZ	Graduated
Bryce White	12	G	6'5"	200	Junior	Portland, OR	Transferred to Warner Pacific
Evan Garrison	14	G	5'10"	170	Junior	Tigard, OR	Graduate transferred to Western Oregon
Donivine Stewart	20	G	6'0"	195	RS Senior	Peoria, IL	Graduated
Austin Bryant	30	F	6'6"	190	Freshman	Murrieta, CA	Walk-on; left the team for personal reasons

=== Incoming transfers ===
Name	Number	Pos.	Height	Weight	Year	Hometown	Previous School
Bryce Canda	0	G	6'4"	200	Junior	Portland, OR	Junior college transferred from Central Wyoming College
Michael Mayhew	2	G	6'3"		Sophomore	Flower Mound, TX	Junior college transferred from Hill College
Deontae North	3	G	6'4"	190	Junior	Corona, CA	Junior college transferred from South Plains College

== 2016 incoming recruits ==
College recruiting
Name	Hometown	School	Height	Weight	Commit date
Tyrell Henderson #78 SG	Chandler, AZ	Corona Del Sol High School	6 ft 3 in (1.91 m)	165 lb (75 kg)	Aug 15, 2015
Tyrell Henderson #78 SG	Recruit ratings: Scout: Rivals: (NR)				
Brendan Rumel; C	Tucson, AZ	Rincon High School	6 ft 11 in (2.11 m)	N/A	Aug 18, 2015
Brendan Rumel; C	Recruit ratings: Scout: Rivals: (NR)				
Overall recruit ranking:
Note: In many cases, Scout, Rivals, 247Sports, On3, and ESPN may conflict in their listings of height and weight.; In these cases, the average was taken. ESPN grades are on a 100-point scale.; Sources: "2016 Team Ranking". Rivals.

== Roster ==
2016–17 Portland State Vikings men's basketball team
Players
Coaches

Pos.	#	Name	Height	Weight	Year	Previous school	Hometown
F	0	Bryce Canda	6 ft 4 in (1.93 m)	200 lb (91 kg)	Jr	Grant; Central Wyoming JC	Portland, OR
G	1	Zach Gengler	6 ft 2 in (1.88 m)	180 lb (82 kg)	Sr	Silverton	Silverton, OR
G	2	Michael Mayhew	6 ft 2 in (1.88 m)	195 lb (88 kg)	So	Marcus	Flower Mound, TX
G	3	Deontae North	6 ft 4 in (1.93 m)	190 lb (86 kg)	Jr	Centennial; South Plains JC	Corona, CA
F	4	Brendan Rumel	6 ft 10 in (2.08 m)	235 lb (107 kg)	Fr	Rinconer	Tucson, AZ
G	5	Tyrell Henderson	6 ft 3 in (1.91 m)	180 lb (82 kg)	Fr	Corona del Sol	Tempe, AZ
G	10	Daniel Davydov (W)	6 ft 0 in (1.83 m)	175 lb (79 kg)	So	Seattle Academy	Bellevue, WA
G	11	Calaen Robinson	6 ft 2 in (1.88 m)	180 lb (82 kg)	RS Sr	Corona del Sol; Arizona State	Tempe, AZ
F	13	De'Sean Parsons	6 ft 7 in (2.01 m)	195 lb (88 kg)	Sr	Grant Union; Salt Lake CC	Sacramento, CA
F	15	Braxton Tucker	6 ft 6 in (1.98 m)	220 lb (100 kg)	RS Jr	Spanaway Lake; North Idaho College	Tacoma, WA
G	22	Brandon Hollins	6 ft 6 in (1.98 m)	200 lb (91 kg)	Jr	Jennings; Paris JC	St. Louis, MO
G	23	Khari Holloway	6 ft 2 in (1.88 m)	185 lb (84 kg)	Sr	Mountain Pointe; Mesa CC	Jackson, MS
C	25	Namdi Okonkwo	7 ft 0 in (2.13 m)	205 lb (93 kg)	Sr	Westwind Prep; Western Wyoming CC	Dallas, TX
C	30	Traylin Farris	6 ft 8 in (2.03 m)	225 lb (102 kg)	Jr	Manvel; Incarnate Word; Odessa JC	Pearland, TX
F	34	Montie Leunen (W)	6 ft 4 in (1.93 m)	190 lb (86 kg)	Sr	Westview; Shasta College	Portland, OR

Head coach

- Tyler Geving (Central Washington)

Assistant coach(es)

- Jeff Hironaka (Eastern Oregon)
- Jase Coburn (Arizona State)
- Chris Skinkis (UW–Parkside)

Legend

- (C) Team captain
- (S) Suspended
- (I) Ineligible
- (W) Walk-on
- Injured
- Current redshirt

Roster

== Schedule and results ==
Date time, TV	Rank^{#}	Opponent^{#}	Result	Record	Site (attendance) city, state
Exhibition
11/04/2016*; 7:35 pm		Linfield	W 87–62		Peter Stott Center; Portland, OR
Non-conference regular season
11/11/2016*; 6:00 pm, P12N		at Arizona State	L 70–88	0–1	Wells Fargo Arena (7,398); Tempe, AZ
11/13/2016*; 4:00 pm		at Cal State Fullerton	L 100–106 ^{2OT}	0–2	Titan Gym (517); Fullerton, CA
11/17/2016*; 7:05 pm		George Fox	W 113–81	1–2	Peter Stott Center (440); Portland, OR
11/25/2016*; 7:00 pm		at Loyola Marymount	L 62–78	1–3	Gersten Pavilion (1,219); Los Angeles, CA
11/27/2016*; 3:30 pm		at Pepperdine	W 91–85	2–3	Firestone Fieldhouse (1,021); Malibu, CA
12/03/2016*; 4:35 pm		Texas–Rio Grande Valley	W 87–74	3–3	Peter Stott Center (408); Portland, OR
12/10/2016*; 7:00 pm		at Cal State Bakersfield	L 79–81	3–4	Icardo Center (1,733); Bakersfield, CA
12/13/2016*; 7:05 pm		New Hope Christian	W 110–79	4–4	Peter Stott Center (206); Portland, OR
12/16/2016*; 7:00 pm		at San Francisco	W 82–78	5–4	War Memorial Gymnasium (1,080); San Francisco, CA
12/20/2016*; 7:00 pm		at Portland	W 77–75	6–4	Chiles Center (2,679); Portland, OR
12/22/2016*; 5:05 pm		Walla Walla	W 118–59	7–4	Peter Stott Center (389); Portland, OR
Big Sky regular season
12/29/2016; 7:05 pm		North Dakota	W 99–62	8–4 (1–0)	Peter Stott Center (612); Portland, OR
12/31/2016; 2:05 pm		Northern Colorado	L 59–73	8–5 (1–1)	Peter Stott Center (506); Portland, OR
01/07/2017; 7:05 pm		Sacramento State	W 83–76	9–5 (2–1)	Peter Stott Center (211); Portland, OR
01/12/2017; 5:30 pm		at Northern Arizona; Postponed (snow), rescheduled for 01/16/2017			Walkup Skydome; Flagstaff, AZ
01/14/2017; 4:30 pm		at Southern Utah	W 88–77	10–5 (3–1)	Centrum Arena (2,658); Cedar City, UT
01/16/2017; 2:30 pm		at Northern Arizona	L 76–83	10–6 (3–2)	Walkup Skydome (711); Flagstaff, AZ
01/19/2017; 7:05 pm		Montana	W 88–79	11–6 (4–2)	Peter Stott Center (728); Portland, OR
01/21/2017; 7:05 pm		Montana State	L 65–71	11–7 (4–3)	Peter Stott Center (705); Portland, OR
01/28/2017; 7:05 pm		at Sacramento State	L 77–80 ^{OT}	11–8 (4–4)	Hornets Nest (916); Sacramento, CA
02/02/2017; 7:00 pm		at Idaho	L 72–89	11–9 (4–5)	Cowan Spectrum (1,014); Moscow, ID
02/04/2017; 1:05 pm		at Eastern Washington	L 124–130 ^{3OT}	11–10 (4–6)	Reese Court (2,026); Cheney, WA
02/09/2017; 7:05 pm		Idaho State	W 74–69	12–10 (5–6)	Peter Stott Center (522); Portland, OR
02/11/2017; 7:05 pm		Weber State	L 93–96 ^{OT}	12–11 (5–7)	Peter Stott Center (784); Portland, OR
02/16/2017; 6:00 pm		at Montana State	L 90–92 ^{OT}	12–12 (5–8)	Brick Breeden Fieldhouse (2,471); Bozeman, MT
02/18/2017; 6:00 pm		at Montana	L 82–85	12–13 (5–9)	Dahlberg Arena (4,465); Missoula, MT
02/23/2017; 7:05 pm		Southern Utah	W 93–86	13–13 (6–9)	Peter Stott Center (592); Portland, OR
02/25/2017; 7:05 pm		Northern Arizona	W 84–72	14–13 (7–9)	Peter Stott Center (891); Portland, OR
03/02/2017; 6:00 pm		at Northern Colorado	L 84–87	14–14 (7–10)	Bank of Colorado Arena (1,282); Greeley, CO
03/04/2017; 1:00 pm		at North Dakota	L 73–82	14–15 (7–11)	Betty Engelstad Sioux Center (2,870); Grand Forks, ND
Big Sky tournament
03/07/2017; 2:35 pm	(8)	vs. (9) Northern Arizona; First Round	W 80–67	15–15	Reno Events Center (1,507); Reno, NV
03/09/2017; 12:05 pm	(8)	vs. (1) North Dakota; Quarterfinals	L 72–95	15–16	Reno Events Center (1,762); Reno, NV
*Non-conference game. ^{#}Rankings from AP Poll. (#) Tournament seedings in parentheses. All times are in Pacific Time.

== See also ==
2016–17 Portland State Vikings women's basketball team
