= 2016–17 Northern Arizona Lumberjacks men's basketball team =

American college basketball season

2016–17 Northern Arizona Lumberjacks men's basketball
- Conference: Big Sky Conference
- Record: 9–23 (6–12 Big Sky)
- Head coach: Jack Murphy (5th season)
- Assistant coaches: Matt Dunn; Wes Pifer; Ben Tucker
- Home arena: Walkup Skydome

2016–17 Big Sky men's basketball standings
	Conf.				Overall
Team	W		L	PCT	W		L	PCT
North Dakota †	14	–	4	.778	22	–	10	.688
Eastern Washington	13	–	5	.722	22	–	12	.647
Idaho	12	–	6	.667	19	–	14	.576
Weber State	12	–	6	.667	20	–	14	.588
Montana	11	–	7	.611	16	–	16	.500
Montana State	11	–	7	.611	16	–	16	.500
Sacramento State	9	–	9	.500	13	–	18	.419
Portland State	7	–	11	.389	15	–	16	.484
Northern Colorado*	7	–	11	.389	11	–	18	.379
Northern Arizona	6	–	12	.333	9	–	23	.281
Southern Utah	3	–	15	.167	6	–	27	.182
Idaho State	3	–	15	.167	5	–	26	.161
† Conference tournament winner

The 2016–17 Northern Arizona Lumberjacks men's basketball team represented Northern Arizona University during the 2016–17 NCAA Division I men's basketball season. The Lumberjacks were led by fifth-year head coach Jack Murphy and played their home games at the Walkup Skydome in Flagstaff, Arizona as members of the Big Sky Conference. They finished the season 9–23, 6–12 in Big Sky play to finish in tenth place. As the no. 9 seed in the Big Sky tournament, the lost in the first round to Portland State.

== Previous season ==
The Lumberjacks finished the 2015–16 season 5–25, 3–14 in Big Sky play to finish in a tie for 11th place. They lost in the first round of the Big Sky tournament to Eastern Washington.

== Departures ==
Name	Number	Pos.	Height	Weight	Year	Hometown	Notes
Kris Yanku	4	G	6'4"	183	Junior	Woodland Hills, CA	Playing professionally overseas
Brady Twombly	14	F	6'5"	225	Freshman	Carlsbad, CA	Transferred to MiraCosta College
Bryant Searcy Jr.	15	G	6'4"	190	Freshman	Tampa, FL	Transferred to Saint Leo
Austin Lee	23	G	5'10"	180	Sophomore	Los Angeles, CA	Left the team for personal reasons
Alessandro Stecca	24	F	6'6"	195	RS Junior	Corona del Mar, CA	Left the team for personal reasons

== 2016 incoming recruits ==
College recruiting information
Name	Hometown	School	Height	Weight	Commit date
Ray Robinson #51 C	Coconut Creek, FL	Deerfield Beach High School	6 ft 8 in (2.03 m)	185 lb (84 kg)	Jun 28, 2015
Ray Robinson #51 C	Recruit ratings: Scout: Rivals: (NR)				
Aziz Seck #92 PF	San Diego, CA	Army & Navy Academy	6 ft 7 in (2.01 m)	190 lb (86 kg)	Jul 14, 2015
Aziz Seck #92 PF	Recruit ratings: Scout: Rivals: (64)				
JoJo Anderson; PG	Houston, TX	22 Feet Academy	6 ft 3 in (1.91 m)	170 lb (77 kg)	Apr 30, 2016
JoJo Anderson; PG	Recruit ratings: Scout: Rivals: (0)				
Travis Rice; SG	Las Vegas, NV	Bishop Gorman High School	6 ft 2 in (1.88 m)	170 lb (77 kg)	Apr 18, 2016
Travis Rice; SG	Recruit ratings: Scout: Rivals: (0)				
Overall recruit ranking:
Note: In many cases, Scout, Rivals, 247Sports, On3, and ESPN may conflict in their listings of height and weight.; In these cases, the average was taken. ESPN grades are on a 100-point scale.; Sources: "2016 Team Ranking". Rivals.

== Roster ==
2016–17 Northern Arizona Lumberjacks men's basketball team
Players
Coaches

Pos.	#	Name	Height	Weight	Year	Previous school	Hometown
G	0	Torry Johnson	6 ft 3 in (1.91 m)	165 lb (75 kg)	RS So	Morgan Park HS	Chicago, IL
G	1	Majestic Tejada	6 ft 0 in (1.83 m)	180 lb (82 kg)	So	McArthur HS	Hollywood, FL
F	2	Corey Brown	6 ft 8 in (2.03 m)	220 lb (100 kg)	So	McArthur HS	Hollywood, FL
G	3	Omar Ndiaye (W)	6 ft 1 in (1.85 m)	160 lb (73 kg)	So	Monte de Sol HS	Santa Fe, NM
G	4	JoJo Anderson	6 ft 3 in (1.91 m)	170 lb (77 kg)	Fr	22 Feet Academy	Houston, TX
G	5	Mike Green	5 ft 10 in (1.78 m)	155 lb (70 kg)	So	Dillard HS	Fort Lauderdale, FL
G	10	Jaleni Neely	6 ft 0 in (1.83 m)	170 lb (77 kg)	RS Sr	Simeon Academy; Eastern Utah	Chicago, IL
F/C	11	Ako Kaluna	6 ft 7 in (2.01 m)	295 lb (134 kg)	Sr	West Ranch HS	Valencia, CA
G	12	Kye de Laveaga (W)	6 ft 1 in (1.85 m)	180 lb (82 kg)	Jr	Westwind Prep	Scottsdale, AZ
F	13	Felix Rivera-Vega	6 ft 6 in (1.98 m)	190 lb (86 kg)	So	McArthur HS	Hollywood, FL
F	14	Raynard Robinson	6 ft 8 in (2.03 m)	230 lb (104 kg)	Fr	Sound Doctrine Christian Academy	Deerfield Beach, FL
F	20	Steven Stanley (W)	6 ft 7 in (2.01 m)	210 lb (95 kg)	So	Brophy College Prep	Phoenix, AZ
F	22	Brooks DeBisschop (W)	6 ft 8 in (2.03 m)	215 lb (98 kg)	Fr	West Linn HS	West Linn, OR
G	30	Travis Rice	6 ft 2 in (1.88 m)	170 lb (77 kg)	Fr	Bishop Gorman HS	Las Vegas, NV
F	33	Isaiah Thomas	6 ft 9 in (2.06 m)	230 lb (104 kg)	So	Bishop O'Dowd HS	Oakland, CA
F	34	Jordyn Martin	6 ft 7 in (2.01 m)	210 lb (95 kg)	RS Sr	Palo Verde HS	Las Vegas, NV
G/F	35	Aziz Seck	6 ft 7 in (2.01 m)	190 lb (86 kg)	Fr	Army & Navy Academy	Dakar, Senegal
G	41	Marcus DeBerry	6 ft 5 in (1.96 m)	155 lb (70 kg)	So	Union City HS	Union City, TN

Head coach

- Jack Murphy (Arizona)

Assistant coach(es)

- Matt Dunn (Fort Hays State)
- Wes Pifer (Penn State Altoona)
- Ben Tucker (Arizona)

Legend

- (C) Team captain
- (S) Suspended
- (I) Ineligible
- (W) Walk-on
- Injured
- Current redshirt

Roster

== Schedule and results ==
Date time, TV	Rank^{#}	Opponent^{#}	Result	Record	Site (attendance) city, state
Non-conference regular season
11/11/2016*; 8:00 pm		at Santa Clara; Cable Car Classic	L 64–67	0–1	Leavey Center (1,821); Santa Clara, CA
11/12/2016*; 9:30 pm		vs. Tennessee State; Cable Car Classic	L 65–69	0–2	Leavey Center (1,734); Santa Clara, CA
11/13/2016*; 1:00 pm		vs. UC Davis; Cable Car Classic	L 76–89	0–3	Leavey Center (1,102); Santa Clara, CA
11/17/2016*; 6:30 pm		vs. Benedictine Mesa	W 91–63	1–3	Warrior Pavilion (782); Tuba City, AZ
11/20/2016*; 6:00 pm, P12N		at Washington; Global Sports Classic	L 58–92	1–4	Alaska Airlines Arena (6,804); Seattle, WA
11/22/2016*; 8:00 pm		at UNLV; Global Sports Classic	L 71–110	1–5	Thomas & Mack Center (8,822); Paradise, NV
11/25/2016*; 2:30 pm		vs. Alabama State; Global Sports Classic	W 71–57	2–5	Thomas & Mack Center; Paradise, NV
11/26/2016*; 2:30 pm		vs. Jacksonville State; Global Sports Classic	L 63–76	2–6	Thomas & Mack Center (244); Paradise, NV
12/03/2016*; 3:00 pm, FSAZ/FCSP		San Diego	L 65–80	2–7	Walkup Skydome (767); Flagstaff, AZ
12/05/2016*; 6:30 pm		Cal State Bakersfield	L 47–81	2–8	Walkup Skydome (678); Flagstaff, AZ
12/14/2016*; 6:30 pm		Little Rock	L 67–72	2–9	Walkup Skydome (584); Flagstaff, AZ
12/17/2016*; 7:00 pm		at UTEP	W 76–74	3–9	Don Haskins Center (5,667); El Paso, TX
12/20/2016*; 6:00 pm		at UIC	L 65–75	3–10	UIC Pavilion (2,810); Chicago, IL
Big Sky regular season
12/31/2016; 12:00 pm		Southern Utah	L 80–93	3–11 (0–1)	Walkup Skydome (581); Flagstaff, AZ
01/05/2017; 6:00 pm		at North Dakota	L 63–68	3–12 (0–2)	Betty Engelstad Sioux Center (1,518); Grand Forks, ND
01/07/2017; 7:00 pm		at Northern Colorado	L 79–83	3–13 (0–3)	Bank of Colorado Arena (1,018); Greeley, CO
01/12/2017; 6:30 pm		Portland State; Postponed (snow), rescheduled for 01/16/2017			Walkup Skydome; Flagstaff, AZ
01/14/2017; 12:30 pm		Sacramento State	L 62–74	3–14 (0–4)	Walkup Skydome (659); Flagstaff, AZ
01/16/2017; 3:30 pm		Portland State	W 83–76	4–14 (1–4)	Walkup Skydome (711); Flagstaff, AZ
01/19/2017; 7:05 pm		at Eastern Washington	L 62–84	4–15 (1–5)	Reese Court (1,519); Cheney, WA
01/21/2017; 8:00 pm		at Idaho	L 49–65	4–16 (1–6)	Cowan Spectrum (1,323); Moscow, ID
01/26/2017; 6:30 pm		Northern Colorado	W 63–50	5–16 (2–6)	Walkup Skydome (1,713); Flagstaff, AZ
01/28/2017; 2:00 pm		North Dakota	W 68–67	6–16 (3–6)	Walkup Skydome (1,658); Flagstaff, AZ
02/02/2017; 7:00 pm		at Idaho State	L 90–91 ^{OT}	6–17 (3–7)	Holt Arena (1,819); Pocatello, ID
02/04/2017; 7:00 pm		at Weber State	L 80–86	6–18 (3–8)	Dee Events Center (1,819); Ogden, UT
02/09/2017; 6:30 pm		Montana State	W 69–63	7–18 (4–8)	Walkup Skydome; Flagstaff, AZ
02/11/2017; 7:30 pm		Montana	L 59–76	7–19 (4–9)	Walkup Skydome (1,453); Flagstaff, AZ
02/18/2017; 2:00 pm		at Southern Utah	L 68–84	7–20 (4–10)	Centrum Arena (1,738); Cedar City, UT
02/23/2017; 8:05 pm		at Sacramento State	W 73–69	8–20 (5–10)	Hornets Nest (849); Sacramento, CA
02/25/2017; 8:00 pm		at Portland State	L 72–84	8–21 (5–11)	Peter Stott Center (891); Greeley, CO
03/02/2017; 6:30 pm		Idaho	L 75–77	8–22 (5–12)	Walkup Skydome (1,426); Flagstaff, AZ
03/04/2017; 4:30 pm		Eastern Washington	W 76–61	9–22 (6–12)	Walkup Skydome; Flagstaff, AZ
Big Sky tournament
03/07/2017; 2:35 pm	(9)	vs. (8) Portland State; First Round	L 67–80	9–23	Reno Events Center (1,507); Reno, NV
*Non-conference game. ^{#}Rankings from AP Poll. (#) Tournament seedings in parentheses. All times are in Mountain Time; Source.
