= Quinton Hooker =

American basketball player (born 1995)

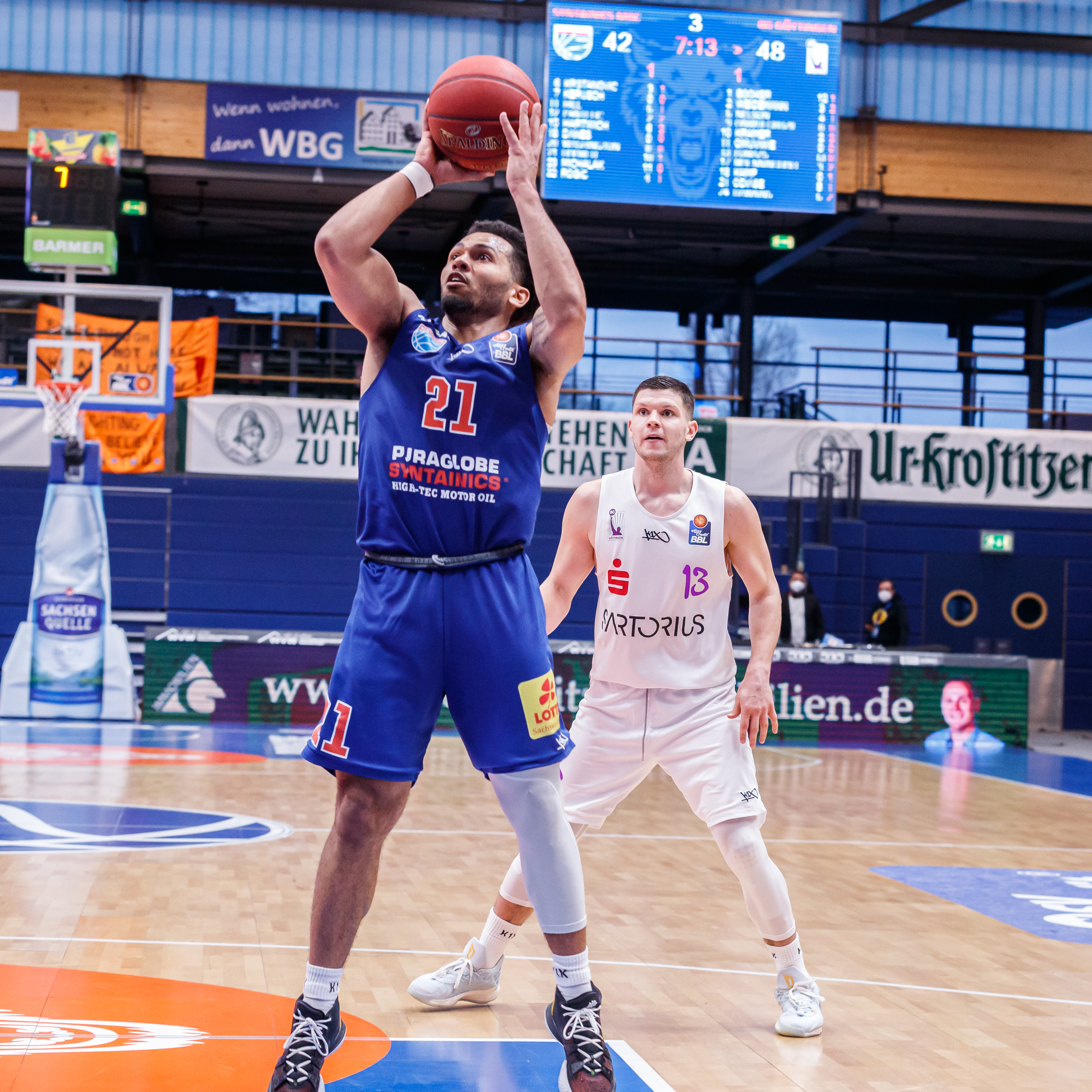

Free Agent
- Position: Point guard

Personal information
- Born: January 22, 1995 (age 31) Brooklyn Park, Minnesota, US
- Listed height: 6 ft 0 in (1.83 m)
- Listed weight: 205 lb (93 kg)

Career information
- High school: Park Center (Brooklyn Park, Minnesota)
- College: North Dakota (2013–2017)
- NBA draft: 2017: undrafted
- Playing career: 2017–present

Career history
- 2017–2018: GTK Gliwice
- 2018–2019: Vichy-Clermont Métropole
- 2019–2020: Falco Szombathely
- 2020–2021: Mitteldeutscher
- 2021–2023: Bnei Herzliya Basket
- 2023–2024: SIG Strasbourg
- 2024–2025: Akern Libertas Livorno

Career highlights
- Israeli State Cup winner (2022); 2× First-team All-Big Sky (2016, 2017); Big Sky tournament MVP (2017); Minnesota Mr. Basketball (2013)

Quinton Hooker (born January 22, 1995) is an American professional basketball player who last played for Akern Libertas Livorno. At a height of 1.83 m (6 ft. 0 in.) tall, he plays at the point guard position.

He attended Park Center High School in his hometown of Brooklyn Park, Minnesota, earning Minnesota Mr. Basketball honors during his senior year after taking his team to the state title game. Nevertheless, he was lightly recruited out of high school and played college basketball at North Dakota from 2013 to 2017, where he was a two-time all-conference selection in the Big Sky during his decorated career. In his senior season he led the Fighting Hawks to a conference title and their first-ever NCAA Division I tournament appearance.

Undrafted out of college, Hooker embarked on an overseas career in Europe, signing his first professional contract with Polish club GTK Gliwice in the summer of 2017. He earned the starting point guard spot in his lone season with the club and noticeably recorded just the tenth triple-double in league history. After a season at French club Vichy-Clermont Métropole, he joined the reigning Hungarian champions Falco Szombathely in 2019, where he played continental basketball in the Basketball Champions League. The team sat atop the domestic league standings when the season was cut short due to the COVID-19 pandemic and no champion was crowned. He joined German club Mitteldeutscher in 2020.

== Early life ==
Hooker was born on January 22, 1995, to Raynard, who is African-American and Janice, who is white. His father, who played college football at Wayne State College, worked in insurance while his mother worked night jobs. Hooker participated in basketball, soccer, baseball and football in his youth, deciding to focus solely on basketball by the time he was in ninth grade.

== High school career ==
Hooker attended and played at Park Center Senior High School in Brooklyn Park, Minnesota, scoring over 2,000 points in his career. He was a starter by the time he was a sophomore. In his junior year, he averaged 26 points, seven rebounds and seven assists per game and was named second-team all-state and all-metro. As a senior, he averaged 23 points per contest and led the Pirates to the Class 4A state title game. In addition to earning first-team all-state honors, he was named Minnesota Mr. Basketball as the best player in the state.

On the AAU circuit he played with the Howard Pulley Panthers, although most of the attention focused on his teammate, five-star guard and eventual Duke commit Tyus Jones. Combined with his relatively short stature at 6'0", Hooker was not considered a major recruit. 247Sports rated him a two-star recruit and he was not ranked by ESPN or Rivals. North Dakota assistant coach Gameli Ahelegbe, who had served as a childhood mentor of his, secured his verbal commitment to the school early on. Although he received several mid-major offers and even made visits to schools like Florida Gulf Coast, he signed his letter of intent (LOI) to play with North Dakota on November 21, 2012.

== College career ==
Hooker played with the University of North Dakota (UND) from 2013–2017, finishing sixth all-time in scoring (just ahead of Phil Jackson), fourth in assists and third in steals. After going 8–22 his sophomore year, he captained the Fighting Hawks his senior year to their first Big Sky conference title (regular-season and tournament) and their maiden appearance in the NCAA Division I tournament.

=== Freshman and sophomore seasons ===
Although he was expected to redshirt his freshman year, the coaching staff felt he was college-ready and informed him he was playing on the day before the first game. He made his UND debut on November 13, 2013, scoring a season-high 17 points against Minnesota Morris, and became a starter late in the season. Hooker played all 34 games that season with modest averages of 4.2 points, 1.9 assists and 1.9 rebounds per game. North Dakota reached the Big Sky conference title game, where they lost to Weber State.

With four guards graduating the year prior, Hooker's minutes doubled in his sophomore season and he was the only player to start and appear in all 30 games, leading the team in scoring (12.8 ppg), assists (4.2 apg), and steals (1.5 spg). He registered his first career double-double with 14 points and 10 assists in an overtime loss to Northern Colorado on January 17, 2015. Two weeks later, he recorded 15 points, 10 assists, nine rebounds in an 80–69 home win over Idaho State, finishing one rebound short of a triple-double. He finished out the season with five straight 20-point games, including a game-high and then-career-high 28 points in their season finale 72–71 win against Northern Colorado. Nevertheless, the Fighting Hawks finished third-last in the conference with a 4–14 record (8–22 overall), failing to qualify for the conference tournament.

=== Junior season ===
In his junior season, Hooker stepped into a leadership role on a team with no seniors. He ranked third in the Big Sky in scoring with 20.1 points per game, which was also the best scoring mark in school history since UND moved up to Division I. He equaled his career-high with 28 points, including 26 in the second half, in their first conference game against Idaho before matching that mark again three weeks later in a 88–72 win at Southern Utah the day after his 21st birthday. On February 4, 2016, he recorded the first triple-double in UND Division I history, tallying 13 points, 10 assists and a career-high 12 rebounds in a 76–60 win over Idaho State. He followed that with an 18-point showing, including four free throws in the closing minutes, that secured a 78–71 victory over league-leaders Weber State, and was named Big Sky Player of the Week for his performances. On February 25, he set a career-high with 38 points in their 80–77 victory against Portland State, shooting 15-for-20 from the field and setting a new UND Division I single-game scoring record. He also surpassed 1,000 career points during the game, becoming just the tenth junior in UND history to reach the mark. Two days later, he scored 34 points in a 97–71 win over Sacramento State on senior night, shooting 11-for-12 and a perfect 5–5 from three-point range. For his back-to-back scoring outbursts he was named Lou Henson National Player of the Week and, for the second time that month, Big Sky Player of the Week.

North Dakota entered the 2016 Big Sky Conference tournament as the no. 5 seed after failing to qualify the year before. They defeated Southern Utah 85–80 in the first round, with Hooker contributing 30 points and eight rebounds. He added 13 points and seven rebounds as UND routed Idaho State 83–49 in the quarterfinals. In their semi-final match-up versus Weber State, Hooker tied his career-high with 38 points on 19 shots, but UND fell in overtime 78–83 to the no. 1 seed and eventual champion Wildcats. He was named to the all-tournament team after leading the first-ever neutral-site Big Sky Championship in scoring with 27.0 points per game. UND finished the season with an 86–89 loss to UC Irvine in the opening round of the 2016 CIT. At the conclusion of the season, Hooker was named first-team All-Big Sky and a Lou Henson Mid-Major All-American.

=== Senior season ===
Ahead of his senior season, Hooker was voted preseason Big Sky MVP by the media. He was named to the Men Against Breast Cancer Classic all-tournament team after averaging 19.3 points and 4.7 rebounds in three games over Thanksgiving weekend. On December 31, 2016, he posted 31 points, five rebounds and three assists in a 90–82 overtime victory over Sacramento State, putting an end to a four-game losing streak. On January 5, 2017, he scored a game-high 20 points in their Big Sky home opener against Northern Arizona, which they won 68–63. On January 26, Hooker filled up the stat sheet with 23 points, seven assists, six rebounds, and two steals, and hit the game-winner with one second left to beat Southern Utah 91–89. He scored a season-high 35 points on February 9 in a 95–86 win over Eastern Washington that broke the second-place tie they had with the Eagles in the conference standings. The team won seven of their last eight regular-season games to finish with a 14–4 Big Sky record and the regular-season conference title.

In the quarterfinals of the 2017 Big Sky Conference tournament, they defeated Portland State 95–72 with Hooker contributing 17 points and seven assists. He recorded 13 points and five assists in their semi-final victory over Idaho. In the finals they faced Weber State, the team that had eliminated UND two out of the last three years. Hooker scored a game-high 28 points, adding five assists and three steals, to lead them to a 93–89 win in the championship game and the school's first-ever berth in the NCAA Division I tournament. As a #15 seed, they faced the #2 seed Arizona in the first round of the west regional. Hooker led his squad in scoring in his final collegiate game with 25 points but they were overwhelmed by the Wildcats and lost 82–100. UND finished the season with a Division I-program record 22 wins, while Hooker finished with averages of 19.3 points, 4.6 rebounds and 3.6 assists per game, earning both first-team All-Big Sky and Lou Henson Mid-Major All-American honors for the second year in a row.

=== Awards and honors ===
- 2× First-team All-Big Sky Conference (2016, 2017)
- Big Sky tournament MVP (2017)
- 2× Big Sky All-Tournament Team (2016, 2017)
- 2× Lou Henson Mid-Major All-American (2016, 2017)
- 2× Lou Henson Mid-Major Player of the Year Award finalist (2016, 2017)
- 2× College Court Report Mid-Major Player of the Year (2016, 2017)
- 2× NABC All-District (6) Second Team (2016, 2017)
- Men Against Breast Cancer Classic All-Tournament Team (2016)
- Glenn "Red" Jarrett UND Male Athlete of the Year (2017)
- Lou Henson National Player of the Week
- 4× Big Sky Player of the Week
- Division I single-game school scoring record
- First Division I triple-double in school history

==== North Dakota career ranks ====
- 5th in games played (128)
- 6th in points (1,787)
- 4th in assists (417)
- 3rd in steals (195)
- 5th in field goals attempted (1,278)
- 10th in field goals made (592)
- 7th in three-pointers attempted (436)
- 7th in three-pointers made (180)
- 7th in free throws made (433)
- 10th in free throws attempted (523)
- 7th in free throw percentage (.828)

== Professional career ==
=== 2017–20 ===
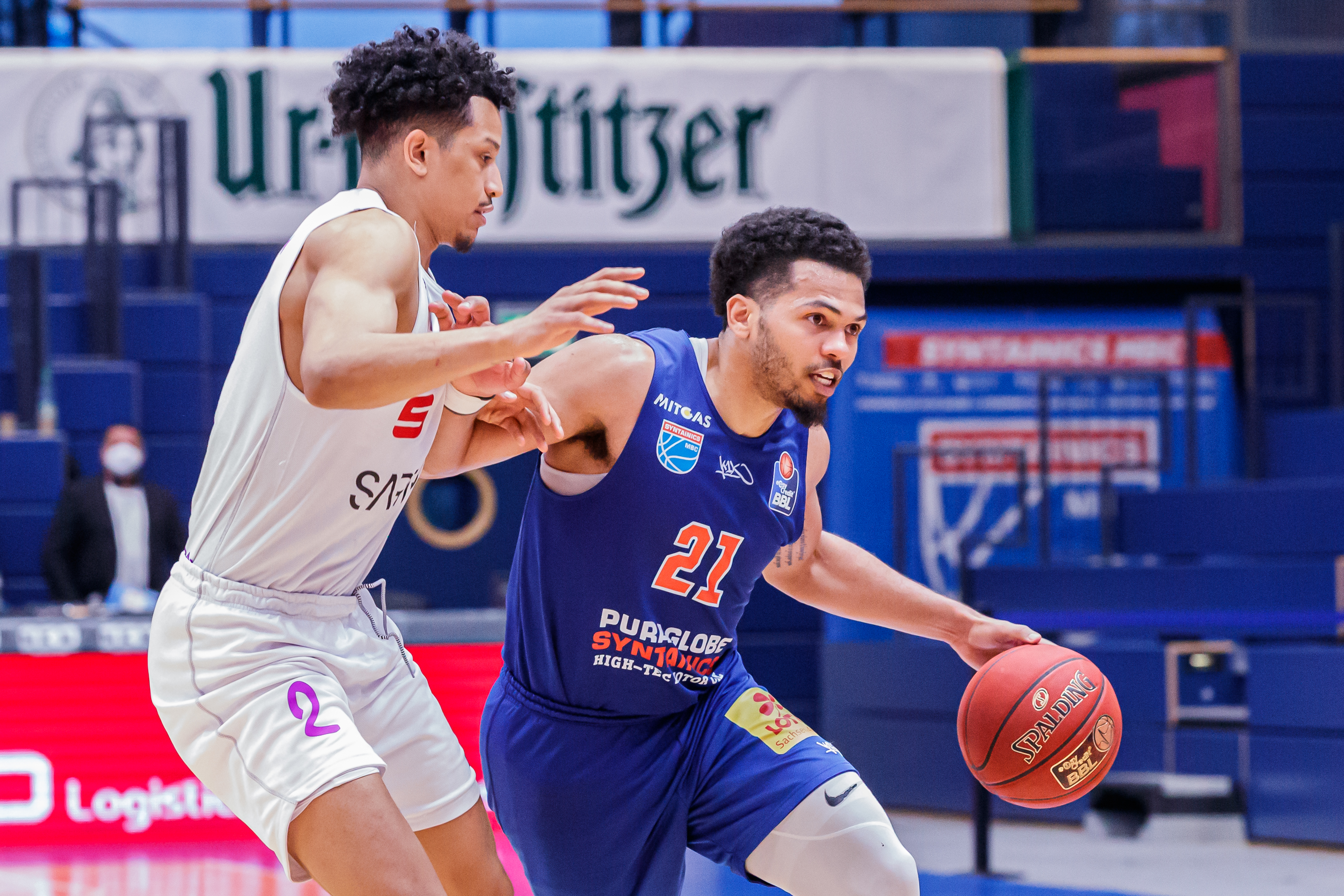
Quinton Hooker

After unsuccessful tryouts with the Houston Rockets and Minnesota Timberwolves, Hooker signed his first professional deal with newly-promoted GTK Gliwice of the Polish Basketball League (PKL) in August 2017. He credited a 2015 UND trip to Europe as having "opened his eyes to the basketball world outside of the United States." He made his pro debut on September 30, coming off the bench during a defeat to Miasto Szkła Krosno, and by December he was the starting point guard. In an overtime loss to Legia Warszawa on February 11, 2018, he recorded 20 points, 16 assists and 13 rebounds – just the tenth triple-double in PKL history. His 16 assists were also a leaguewide season-high. On March 28 he scored a season-high 40 points, adding 10 assists and five rebounds in another loss to Stal Ostrów Wielkopolski. In 31 games with Gliwice that season, Hooker averaged 15.0 points, 5.0 assists and 4.7 rebounds per game.

Hooker joined the French second-tier club Vichy-Clermont Métropole on a one-year deal in July 2018. He started all 34 regular-season games during the 2018–19 season, averaging 12.1 points, 3.0 assists, 3.0 rebounds and 1.6 steals per game. Vichy-Clermont finished in third place in the league but were upset in the first round of the playoffs by Gries Oberhoffen.

In July 2019 Hooker signed with Falco Szombathely, the reigning Hungarian champions. He made his debut with the team on September 17 as the starting point guard in their Basketball Champions League (BCL) qualifying round victory against Romanian champs CSM Oradea. He registered a season-high 20 points and four assists in a 95–82 league win over Alba Fehérvár on November 2. He also recorded a season-high seven assists to go with nine points in an 89–80 BCL group stage win over PAOK at the P.A.O.K. Sports Arena on December 17. Falco was eliminated from BCL play following the group stage, but sat at the top of the Hungarian League standings when the season was prematurely cut short due to the COVID-19 pandemic in March. No national champion was crowned and no teams were relegated. In 21 league games Hooker averaged 9.2 points, 2.3 rebounds, 2.8 assists and 1.4 steals per game, and Eurobasket.com named him an All-Hungarian League honorable mention for the season. Additionally, he played in 18 BCL games, posting averages of 8.7 points, 3.3 rebounds, 2.9 assists and 1.4 steals per game.

=== 2020–present ===
He signed a one-year deal with Mitteldeutscher of the German Basketball Bundesliga in July 2020. Hooker averaged 14.0 points, 5.2 assists, and 1.3 steals per game. On June 30, 2021, he signed with Riesen Ludwigsburg of the Basketball Bundesliga.

Hooker signed with Bnei Herzliya Basket of the Israeli Basketball Premier League on September 6, 2021. In 2021–22 for the team, he averaged 10.8 points, 4.8 assists, and 1.3 steals per game in 22 games.

On July 4, 2023, he signed with SIG Strasbourg of the French LNB Pro A.

Prior to the 2024–25 season, he signed with Akern Libertas Livorno of the Italian Serie A2.

== Career statistics ==
=== College ===
Year	Team	GP	GS	MPG	FG%	3P%	FT%	RPG	APG	SPG	BPG	PPG
2013–14	North Dakota	34	15	17.6	.393	.250	.778	1.9	1.9	1.0	.2	4.2
2014–15	North Dakota	30	30	34.2	.449	.441	.758	4.3	4.2	1.5	.3	12.8
2015–16	North Dakota	32	31	35.5	.487	.383	.858	4.9	3.5	1.9	.3	20.1
2016–17	North Dakota	32	31	36.1	.468	.444	.865	4.6	3.6	1.8	.2	19.3
Career		128	107	30.6	.463	.390	.828	3.9	3.3	1.5	.2	14.0

== Personal life ==
Hooker has two older sisters, Chelsia and Brehana, who were also athletes at Park Center High School and now work as a registered nurse and at Delta Air Lines, respectively. He also has a younger brother, Amani, who plays as a safety for the Tennessee Titans after a three-year college career at Iowa.

He got engaged to his high school sweetheart shortly before signing his first professional deal.
