= 2016–17 Southern Utah Thunderbirds men's basketball team =

American college basketball season

2016–17 Southern Utah Thunderbirds men's basketball
- Conference: Big Sky Conference
- Record: 6–27 (3–15 Big Sky)
- Head coach: Todd Simon (1st season)
- Assistant coaches: John Wardenburg; Andy Johnson; Drew Allen
- Home arena: Centrum Arena

2016–17 Big Sky men's basketball standings
	Conf.				Overall
Team	W		L	PCT	W		L	PCT
North Dakota †	14	–	4	.778	22	–	10	.688
Eastern Washington	13	–	5	.722	22	–	12	.647
Idaho	12	–	6	.667	19	–	14	.576
Weber State	12	–	6	.667	20	–	14	.588
Montana	11	–	7	.611	16	–	16	.500
Montana State	11	–	7	.611	16	–	16	.500
Sacramento State	9	–	9	.500	13	–	18	.419
Portland State	7	–	11	.389	15	–	16	.484
Northern Colorado*	7	–	11	.389	11	–	18	.379
Northern Arizona	6	–	12	.333	9	–	23	.281
Southern Utah	3	–	15	.167	6	–	27	.182
Idaho State	3	–	15	.167	5	–	26	.161
† Conference tournament winner

The 2016–17 Southern Utah Thunderbirds basketball team represented Southern Utah University during the 2016–17 NCAA Division I men's basketball season. The Thunderbirds were led by first-year head coach Todd Simon and played their home games at the Centrum Arena in Cedar City, Utah as members of the Big Sky Conference. They finished the season 6–27, 3–15 in Big Sky play to finish in a tie for 11th. As the No. 11 seed in the Big Sky tournament, they defeated Montana State in the first round before losing to Weber State in the quarterfinals.

== Previous season ==
The Thunderbirds finished the season 5–24, 3–15 in Big Sky play to finish in a tie for 11th place. They lost in the first round of the Big Sky tournament to North Dakota. On March 9, 2016, head coach Nick Robinson was fired. On March 22, the school hired Todd Simon as head coach.

== Departures ==
Name	Number	Pos.	Height	Weight	Year	Hometown	Notes
Travon Langston	3	G	6'3"	190	Senior	Las Vegas, NV	Graduated
Trey Kennedy	4	G	6'3"	195	Junior	Las Vegas, NV	Transferred to Midwestern State
Daniel Melifonwu	12	F	6'9"	220	Freshman	San Diego, CA	Transferred to Connors State College
Christian Thompson	25	G/F	6'7"	180	Senior	Phoenix, AZ	Graduated
Casey Oliverson	32	F	6'8"	225	Senior	Logan, UT	Graduated
A. J. Hess	35	G/F	6'6"	210	Senior	Carefree, AZ	Graduated

=== Incoming transfers ===
Name	Number	Pos.	Height	Weight	Year	Hometown	Previous School
Jadon Cohee	12	G	6'4"	182	Junior	Langley, BC	Transferred from Seattle. Under NCAA transfer rules, Cohee will have to sit out for the 2016–17 season. Will have two years of remaining eligibility.
Christian Musoko	34	F	6'8"	235	Junior	Kinshasa, Congo	Junior college transferred from Salt Lake CC
Elliott Smith		F	6'6"	185	Junior	Oakley, CA	Junior college transferred from Harcum College
Hamdi Karoui		F	6'7"	220	Junior	Paris, France	Junior college transferred from College of Eastern Utah

== 2016 incoming recruits ==
College recruiting information
Name	Hometown	School	Height	Weight	Commit date
Kaijae Yee-Stephens; SG	Santa Cruz, CA	Santa Cruz High School	6 ft 2 in (1.88 m)	190 lb (86 kg)	Oct 13, 2015
Kaijae Yee-Stephens; SG	Recruit ratings: Scout: Rivals: (NR)				
Taylor Miller; SG	Las Vegas, NV	Palo Verde High School	6 ft 2 in (1.88 m)	N/A	
Taylor Miller; SG	Recruit ratings: Scout: Rivals: (NR)				
Maizen Fausett; SG	Saratoga Springs, UT	Westlake High School	6 ft 6 in (1.98 m)	N/A	
Maizen Fausett; SG	Recruit ratings: Scout: Rivals: (NR)				
Jacob Calloway; SG	Juneau, AK	Thunder Mountain High School	6 ft 7 in (2.01 m)	195 lb (88 kg)	
Jacob Calloway; SG	Recruit ratings: Scout: Rivals: (NR)				
Decardo Day; PG	Jackson, MS	Callaway High School	6 ft 4 in (1.93 m)	170 lb (77 kg)	May 10, 2016
Decardo Day; PG	Recruit ratings: Scout: Rivals: (NR)				
Ivan Madunic; PF	Split, Croatia		6 ft 11 in (2.11 m)	220 lb (100 kg)	Apr 21, 2016
Ivan Madunic; PF	Recruit ratings: Scout: Rivals: (NR)				
Overall recruit ranking:
Note: In many cases, Scout, Rivals, 247Sports, On3, and ESPN may conflict in their listings of height and weight.; In these cases, the average was taken. ESPN grades are on a 100-point scale.; Sources: "2016 Team Ranking". Rivals.

== Roster ==
2016–17 Southern Utah Thunderbirds men's basketball team
Players
Coaches

Pos.	#	Name	Height	Weight	Year	Previous school	Hometown
G	2	Randy Onwausor	6 ft 3 in (1.91 m)	210 lb (95 kg)	RS Jr	Inglewood HS; Texas Tech	Inglewood, CA
G	3	Decardo Day	6 ft 4 in (1.93 m)	170 lb (77 kg)	Fr	Callaway HS	Jackson, MS
G	4	Neema Namdar (W)	6 ft 1 in (1.85 m)	170 lb (77 kg)	Fr	Alta HS	Sandy, UT
G	5	John Marshall	6 ft 1 in (1.85 m)	180 lb (82 kg)	Sr	Westwind Prep	Phoenix, AZ
F	10	Jacob Calloway	6 ft 8 in (2.03 m)	205 lb (93 kg)	Fr	On Point Academy	Juneau, AK
F	11	Will Joyce	6 ft 5 in (1.96 m)	205 lb (93 kg)	Sr	Newark East Side; New Mexico Military Institute	Newark, NJ
G	12	Jadon Cohee (I) (redshirt)	6 ft 4 in (1.93 m)	205 lb (93 kg)	Jr	Walnut Grove Secondary; Seattle	Langley, BC
G	13	Race Parsons	6 ft 4 in (1.93 m)	185 lb (84 kg)	Sr	South Sevier HS	Monroe, UT
G	14	James McGee (W)	6 ft 2 in (1.88 m)	180 lb (82 kg)	RS Jr	Mater Dei HS	San Clemente, CA
F	22	Ivan Madunic	6 ft 11 in (2.11 m)	220 lb (100 kg)	Fr	None	Split, Croatia
G	24	Adonis Saltes	6 ft 2 in (1.88 m)	180 lb (82 kg)	So	Valley HS	Pine Ridge, SD
G	33	Matthew Johnson (W)	6 ft 4 in (1.93 m)	185 lb (84 kg)	So	Coronado HS	Las Vegas, NV
F/C	34	Christian Musoko	6 ft 8 in (2.03 m)	235 lb (107 kg)	Jr	Layton Christian HS; Salt Lake CC	Kinshasa, Congo
F	35	Brayden Holker	6 ft 9 in (2.06 m)	225 lb (102 kg)	RS Fr	Westlake HS	Saratoga Springs, UT
F	44	Joel Swallow (W)	6 ft 9 in (2.06 m)	220 lb (100 kg)	So	Millard HS	Howell, UT

Head coach

- Todd Simon (UNLV)

Assistant coach(es)

- John Wardenburg (BYU)
- Andy Johnson (UNLV)
- Patrice Days (New Orleans)

Legend

- (C) Team captain
- (S) Suspended
- (I) Ineligible
- (W) Walk-on
- Injured
- Current redshirt

Roster

== Schedule and results ==
Date time, TV	Rank^{#}	Opponent^{#}	Result	Record	Site (attendance) city, state
Exhibition
10/29/2016*; 6:30 pm		Master's	W 110–86		Centrum Arena (400); Cedar City, UT
11/04/2016*; 6:30 pm		La Verne	W 103–89		Centrum Arena (600); Cedar City, UT
Non-conference regular season
11/11/2016*; 6:00 pm		at Valparaiso; Men Who Speak Up Main Event	L 65–79	0–1	Athletics–Recreation Center (3,560); Valparaiso, IN
11/14/2016*; 6:00 pm		at Saint Louis; Men Who Speak Up Main Event	L 76–88	0–2	Chaifetz Arena (4,725); St. Louis, MO
11/18/2016*; 6:30 pm		Bethesda	W 108–92	1–2	Centrum Arena (600); Cedar City, UT
11/21/2016*; 4:00 pm		vs. Coastal Carolina; Men Who Speak Up Main Event Middleweight	L 68–83	1–3	MGM Grand Garden Arena; Paradise, NV
11/23/2016*; 1:30 pm		vs. Ball State; Men Who Speak Up Main Event Middleweight	L 83–94	1–4	MGM Grand Garden Arena; Paradise, NV
11/26/2016*; 4:30 pm		Life Pacific	W 101–56	2–4	Centrum Arena (350); Cedar City, UT
11/30/2016*; 7:00 pm		UNLV	L 81–89	2–5	Centrum Arena (4,249); Cedar City, UT
12/03/2016*; 1:00 pm		at Oakland	L 68–78	2–6	Athletics Center O'rena (2,984); Rochester Hills, MI
12/08/2016*; 8:00 pm		at Loyola Marymount	L 68–75	2–7	Gersten Pavilion (1,561); Los Angeles, CA
12/10/2016*; 7:00 pm		at Cal State Fullerton	L 62–75	2–8	Titan Gym (520); Fullerton, CA
12/17/2016*; 4:00 pm		IUPUI	L 81–101	2–9	Centrum Arena (1,012); Cedar City, UT
12/19/2016*; 8:00 pm		at Seattle	L 75–89	2–10	KeyArena (1,235); Seattle, WA
12/21/2016*; 8:00 pm		at San Jose State	L 82–92	2–11	Event Center (1,289); San Jose, CA
Big Sky regular season
12/31/2016; 12:00 pm		at Northern Arizona	W 93–80	3–11 (1–0)	Walkup Skydome (581); Flagstaff, AZ
01/05/2017; 7:00 pm		at Northern Colorado	W 78–76	4–11 (2–0)	Bank of Colorado Arena (833); Greeley, CO
01/07/2017; 2:00 pm		at North Dakota	L 65–95	4–12 (2–1)	Betty Engelstad Sioux Center (1,749); Grand Forks, ND
01/12/2017; 6:30 pm		Sacramento State	L 83–88	4–13 (2–2)	Centrum Arena (1,668); Cedar City, UT
01/14/2017; 6:30 pm		Portland State	L 77–88	4–14 (2–3)	Centrum Arena (2,658); Cedar City, UT
01/19/2017; 7:00 pm		at Idaho	L 67–79	4–15 (2–4)	Cowan Spectrum (889); Moscow, ID
01/21/2017; 2:00 pm		at Eastern Washington	L 68–83	4–16 (2–5)	Reese Court (1,621); Cheney, WA
01/26/2017; 6:30 pm		North Dakota	L 89–91	4–17 (2–6)	Centrum Arena (2,069); Cedar City, UT
01/28/2017; 4:00 pm		Northern Colorado	L 71–89	4–18 (2–7)	Centrum Arena (1,802); Cedar City, UT
02/02/2017; 7:00 pm		at Weber State	W 74–70	4–19 (2–8)	Dee Events Center (6,436); Ogden, UT
02/04/2017; 7:05 pm		at Idaho State	L 68–94	4–20 (2–9)	Holt Arena (1,721); Pocatello, ID
02/09/2017; 6:30 pm		Montana	L 55–70	4–21 (2–10)	Centrum Arena (1,923); Cedar City, UT
02/11/2017; 2:00 pm		Montana State	L 78–83	4–22 (2–11)	Centrum Arena (1,761); Cedar City, UT
02/18/2017; 2:00 pm		Northern Arizona	W 84–68	5–22 (3–11)	Centrum Arena (1,738); Cedar City, UT
02/23/2017; 8:00 pm		at Portland State	L 86–93	5–23 (3–12)	Peter Stott Center (592); Portland, OR
02/25/2017; 8:00 pm		at Sacramento State	L 76–86	5–24 (3–13)	Hornets Nest (902); Sacramento, CA
03/02/2017; 6:30 pm		Eastern Washington	L 75–91	5–25 (3–14)	Centrum Arena (2,159); Cedar City, UT
03/04/2017; 4:00 pm		Idaho	L 75–84	5–26 (3–15)	Centrum Arena (2,010); Cedar City, UT
Big Sky tournament
03/07/2017; 8:05 pm	(11)	vs. (6) Montana State; First Round	W 109–105 ^{3OT}	6–26	Reno Events Center (1,507); Reno, NV
03/09/2017; 8:05 pm	(11)	vs. (3) Weber State; Quarterfinals	L 70–90	6–27	Reno Events Center (1,903); Reno, NV
*Non-conference game. ^{#}Rankings from AP Poll. (#) Tournament seedings in parentheses. All times are in Mountain Time.
