= Park Center Senior High School =

Public school in Minnesota, United States

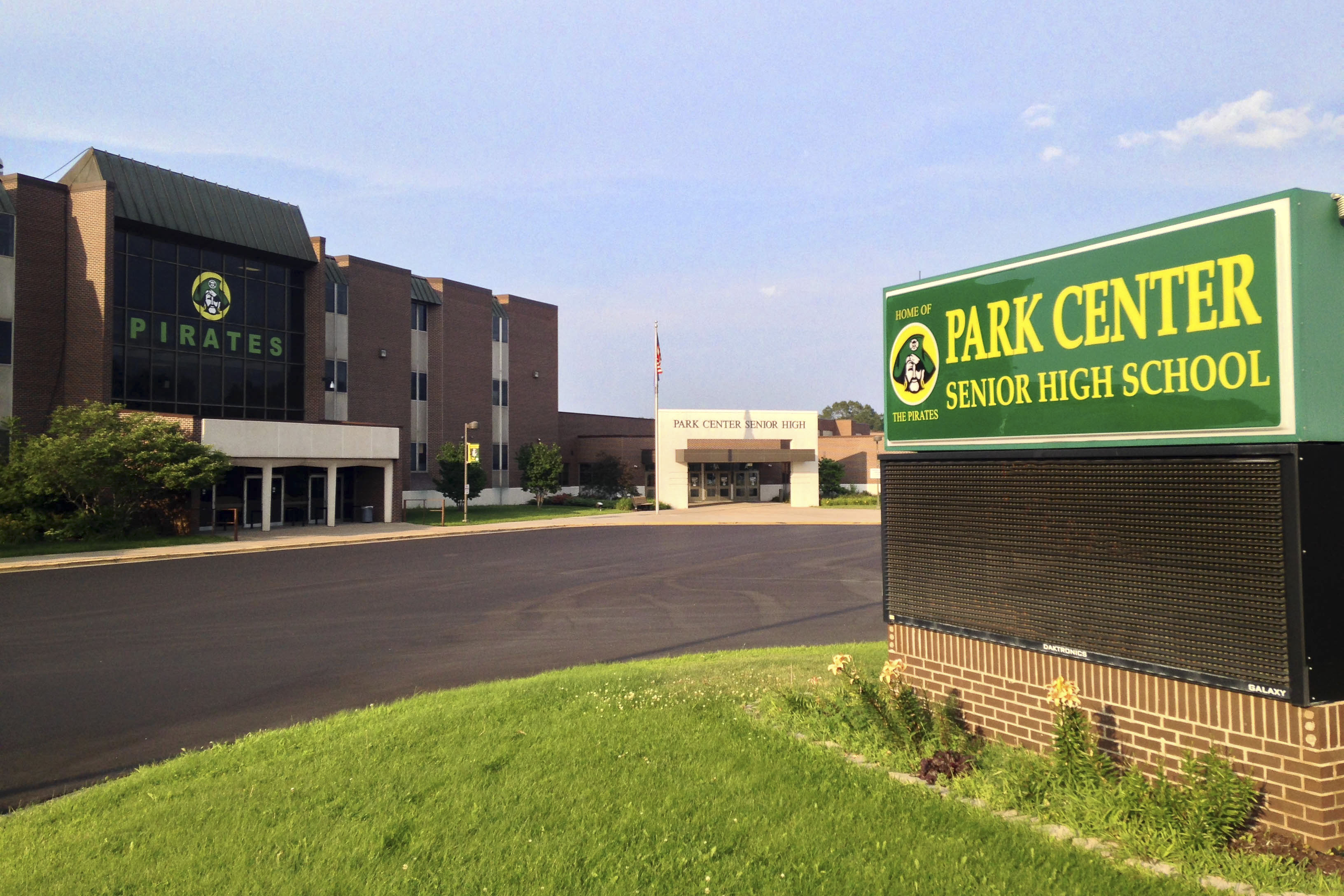

Location
- 7300 Brooklyn Boulevard; Brooklyn Park, Minnesota 55443; United States; 45°5′17″N 93°20′38″W

Information
- Type: Public
- Motto: Once a Pirate, Always a Pirate
- Established: 1971
- Principal: Antwan Harris
- Teaching staff: 130.49 (FTE)
- Enrollment: 2,061 (2024-2025)
- Student to teacher ratio: 15.79
- Colors: Green; Gold
- Team name: Pirates
- Website: pcsh.osseoschools.org

Park Center Senior High School (PCSH) is a four-year public high school located in Brooklyn Park, Minnesota, United States, on 7300 Brooklyn Blvd. PCSH is located near the border of two northwest twin cities suburbs, Brooklyn Park and Brooklyn Center, thus the school name "Park Center" is a combination of these city names. The principal is Antwan Harris. Park Center Senior High's mascot is a pirate and the school's sports teams are known as the Pirates. The school's colors are green and gold. From their website, "As an International Baccalaureate (IB) school, Park Center Senior High infuses core curriculum with a world focus that helps young people understand their role as responsible world citizens."

== School overview ==
Park Center Senior High School is one of three public high schools in the Osseo Area School District 279 and one of two public high schools located in the city of Brooklyn Park. (Brooklyn Park is served by 3 school districts: Osseo Area School District 279, Anoka-Hennepin School District 11, Robbinsdale Area Schools). In August 2007 Park Center became an official International Baccalaureate (IB) School. It is currently offering the Middle Years Programme (MYP) to ninth and tenth grade students. The first IB students graduated in 2009. Park Center is a magnet school open to any student in the Northwest Suburban Integration School District (NWSISD.) Park Center is one of only 20 public schools in Minnesota that are authorized to offer the Diploma Programme. In addition to International Baccalaureate classes, Park Center also offers college-level Advanced Placement classes.

The NWSISD is a consortium of seven districts in the northwest suburban area of Minneapolis which has been formed to promote integration and eliminate racial isolation of students in these districts. By creating magnet schools in IB, math & science, and in the arts the NWSISD has begun to bring students of diverse backgrounds together in programs based on academic excellence.

PCSH students come from about 20 different countries and speak roughly 35 different languages. Demographic information lists the student population as 36.0% Black, 31.5% Asian, 9.9% White, 16.2% Hispanic, and 1.3% are American Indian as of data from the Minnesota Department of Education in February 2024. The student population has 1,991 total students.

Departments: Arts, Business Education, Career and Technology Education, Cooperative Education, EL Department, Family & Consumer Science, Individuals & Societies(Social Studies), Language and Literature (English), Language Acquisition(Spanish, French, Hmong), Mathematics, Music, Physical and Health Education, Sciences, Social Work, Special Education.

== Athletics and activities ==
=== Basketball ===
The Pirates Boys’ basketball team won the 2022 MSHSL AAAA state championship. The Pirates Boys’ basketball team placed 2nd in the 2023 MSHSL AAAA state championship.

The Pirates girls' basketball team won the 2014 and 2015 MSHSL AAA state championship.

=== Baseball ===
Park Centers baseball program is formed to make the PCM Pirates. They are merged with Colombia Heights, and Maranatha. As of 2026, their head coach is Bernard Brinkley

=== Hockey ===
The Pirates girls' hockey team won the 2000 MSHSL state championship. The boys and girls programs are merged with Osseo Senior High School to form Osseo-Park Center hockey (OPC)

=== Adapted Athletics ===
The Pirates have two coed Adapted Soccer, Floor Hockey, and Softball programs under MSHSL rules, they co-operate with Maple Grove and Osseo for these teams. They were formerly known as the Osseo 79ers (named after District 279) before transitioning to being the Park Center Pirates in Adapted Soccer, Maple Grove Crimson in Adapted Floor Hockey, and Osseo Orioles in Adapted Softball. They have both PI and CI programs for Physically and Cognitively Impaired students. They have won state championships in 1994, 1996, 1998, and 2025 in PI Adapted Soccer, 2008, 2009, 2015, 2016, and 2017 in CI Adapted Soccer, 1997 and 1999 in PI Adapted Floor Hockey, 1998, 2003, and 2008 in CI Adapted Floor Hockey, 1994, 1996, 1998, 1999, and 2000 in PI Adapted Softball, and 2000, 2001, 2002, 2003, 2004, 2007, 2008, and 2009 in CI Adapted Softball

== Theatre program ==
Each Spring, Park Center students perform a musical in the auditorium. Recent showings include Big Fish in 2020, Urinetown in 2021, All Shook Up in 2022, SpongeBob SquarePants (musical) in 2023, and Les Miserables in 2024. Students in the program are participants across many focuses including acting, technical crew, and pit orchestra.

Park Center also performs a yearly fall play.

== Notable alumni ==
- Jon Borchardt - Former starting tackle for the Buffalo Bills and Seattle Seahawks.
- Dave Brat - United States Congressman from Virginia's 7th district
- Amani Hooker - Class of 16 safety, played football for Iowa University, and currently #37 for the Tennessee Titans.
- Quinton Hooker (born 1995) - basketball player in the Israeli Basketball Premier League
- Tim Jackman - Former NHL right wing for the Anaheim Ducks
- Tim Laudner - Former Minnesota Twins catcher.
- Pat Neshek - Former professional Major League Baseball player
- Ansu Toure - Professional soccer player (footballer), formerly of the Minnesota Thunder.
- Krissy Wendell (Pohl) - Former Women's Hockey Olympic silver medalist (Salt Lake City), two-time NCAA Champion University of Minnesota (2004 and 2005)
