= 2016–17 American Athletic Conference men's basketball season =

- League: NCAA Division I
- Sport: Basketball
- Duration: November 2016 through March 2017
- Teams: 11
- TV partner(s): ESPN, CBS, ASN

Regular Season
- Champions: SMU
- Season MVP: Semi Ojeleye

Tournament
- Champions: SMU
- Runners-up: Cincinnati

American Athletic Conference men's basketball seasons
- ← 2015–16 2017–18

2016–17 American Athletic Conference men's basketball standings
	Conf.				Overall
Team	W		L	PCT	W		L	PCT
No. 11 SMU †	17	–	1	.944	30	–	5	.857
No. 18 Cincinnati	16	–	2	.889	30	–	6	.833
Houston	12	–	6	.667	21	–	11	.656
UCF	11	–	7	.611	24	–	12	.667
Memphis	9	–	9	.500	19	–	13	.594
UConn	9	–	9	.500	16	–	17	.485
Tulsa	8	–	10	.444	15	–	17	.469
Temple	7	–	11	.389	16	–	16	.500
East Carolina	6	–	12	.333	15	–	18	.455
Tulane	3	–	15	.167	6	–	25	.194
South Florida	1	–	17	.056	7	–	23	.233
† 2017 AAC tournament winner Rankings from AP poll

The 2016–17 American Athletic Conference men's basketball season began with practices in October 2016, followed by the start of the 2016–17 NCAA Division I men's basketball season in November. The conference held its media day on October 24, 2016. Conference play began on December 27, 2016 and concluded on March 4, 2017.

SMU won the regular season championship by one game over Cincinnati. The American Athletic Conference tournament was held from March 9 through March 12 at the XL Center in Hartford, Connecticut. SMU defeated Cincinnati in the tournament championship to earn the conference's automatic bid to the NCAA tournament. Simi Ojeleye was named the Tournament MVP.

SMU's Semi Ojeleye was also named the conference's Player of the Year. SMU's head coach, Tim Jankovich, was named Coach of the Year.

Two AAC teams were invited to the NCAA Tournament, Cincinnati and SMU. Houston and UCF received bids to the NIT.

== Head coaches ==
=== Coaching changes ===
- Josh Pastner left Memphis for the Georgia Tech job and was replaced by Texas Tech coach Tubby Smith.
- Larry Brown resigned as SMU coach on July 8, 2016. Tim Jankovich, who had been hired along with Brown in 2012 as his top assistant and designated successor, was elevated to the top spot.
- Tulane fired Ed Conroy. Former NBA coach Mike Dunleavy was hired for his first college coaching job, after a six-year hiatus from coaching.
- UCF fired Donnie Jones was fired on March 10 after six seasons. Johnny Dawkins was hired after being fired by Stanford.

=== Coaches ===
Team	Head coach	Previous job	Years at school	Overall record	AAC record	AAC titles	NCAA Tournaments	NCAA Final Fours	NCAA Championships
Cincinnati	Mick Cronin	Murray State	11	237–135	56–16	1	7	0	0
Connecticut	Kevin Ollie	Connecticut (asst.)	5	113–61	42–30	0	2	1	1
East Carolina	Jeff Lebo	Auburn	7	114–118	16–38	0	0	0	0
Houston	Kelvin Sampson	Houston Rockets (asst.)	3	56–40	28–26	0	0	0	0
Memphis	Tubby Smith	Texas Tech	1	19–13	9–9	0	0	0	0
SMU	Tim Jankovich	SMU (asst.)	2	39–5	17–1	1	1	0	0
South Florida	Murry Bartow	South Florida (asst.)	1	1–16	1–15	0	0	0	0
Temple	Fran Dunphy	Penn	11	230–136	38–34	1	7	0	0
Tulane	Mike Dunleavy	n/a	1	6–25	3–15	0	0	0	0
Tulsa	Frank Haith	Missouri	3	58–40	34–20	0	1	0	0
UCF	Johnny Dawkins	Stanford	1	24–12	11–7	0	0	0	0

Notes:

- Overall and AAC records are from time at current school and are through the end of 2016–17 season. NCAA records include time at current school only.
- AAC records are only from 2013–14 season to present, prior conference records not included.
- Orlando Antigua was fired after the first 13 games of the season amid academic fraud allegations. Murry Bartow was named interim coach for the remainder of the season.
- Jeff Lebo underwent hip surgery on January 16, 2017 and missed the rest of the 2016–17 season. Assistant coach Michael Perry took over as head coach in Lebo's absence.

== Preseason ==
=== Preseason Coaches Poll ===
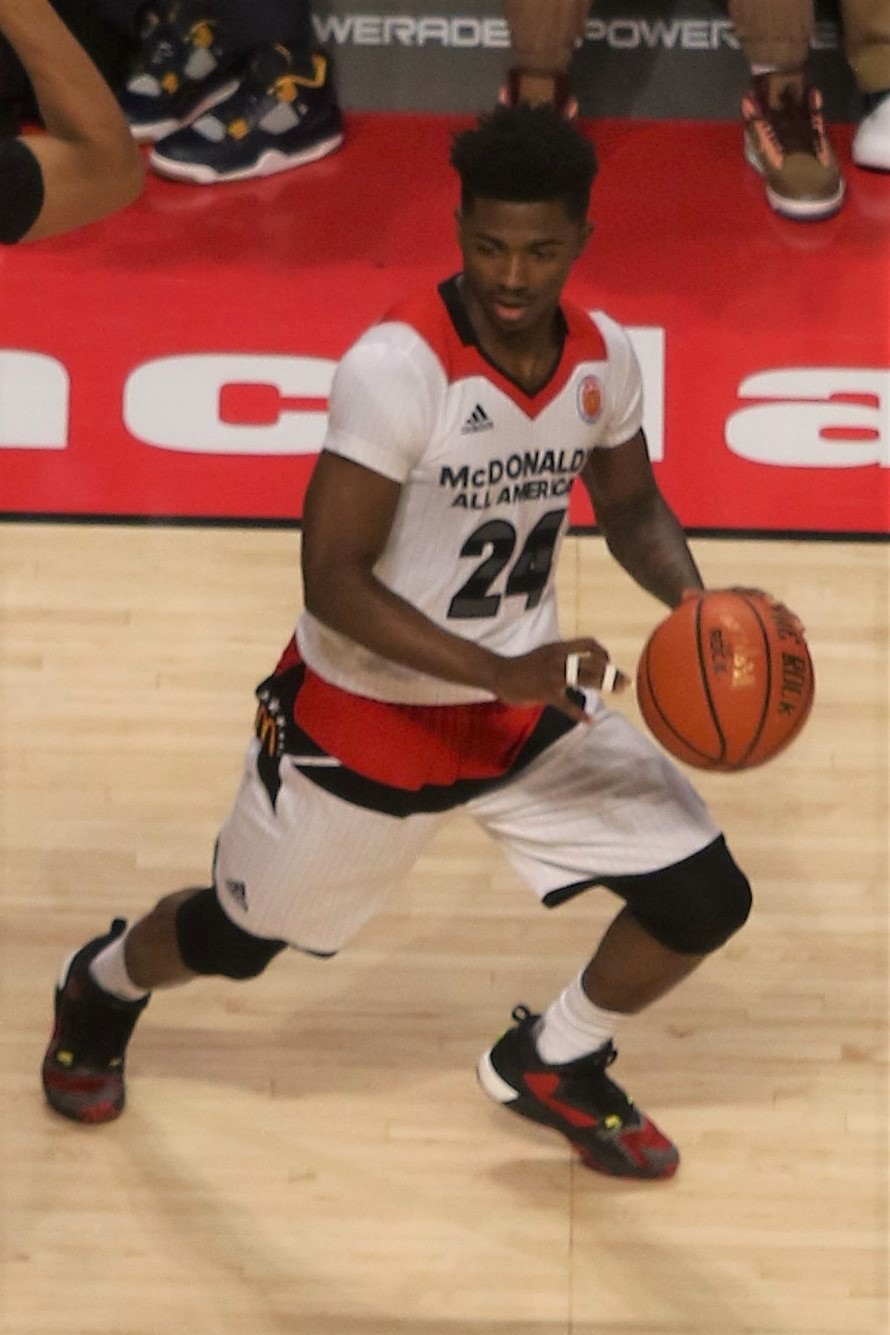
Alterique Gilbert at the 2016 McDonald's All-American Game

AAC Media Day took place October 24, 2016, in Philadelphia, Pennsylvania. Cincinnati was picked to win the conference's regular season (six votes) with Connecticut a close second (five votes).

Rank	Team
1.	Cincinnati (6)
2.	Connecticut (5)
3.	SMU
4.	Houston
5.	Memphis
6.	Temple
7.	East Carolina
8.	UCF
9.	Tulsa
10.	South Florida
11.	Tulane

first place votes in parentheses

=== Preseason All-AAC Teams ===
Honor	Recipient
Preseason Player of the Year	Troy Caupain, Cincinnati; Dedric Lawson, Memphis
Preseason All-AAC First Team
Preseason All-AAC First Team	Troy Caupain, Cincinnati
Preseason All-AAC First Team	Gary Clark, Cincinnati
Preseason All-AAC First Team	Dedric Lawson, Memphis
Preseason All-AAC First Team	Ben Moore, SMU
Preseason All-AAC First Team	Damyean Dotson, Houston
Preseason All-AAC Second Team
Preseason All-AAC Second Team	Shake Milton, SMU
Preseason All-AAC Second Team	Jalen Adams, Connecticut
Preseason All-AAC Second Team	Jahmal McMurray, USF
Preseason All-AAC Second Team	Rob Gray, Houston
Preseason All-AAC Second Team	B. J. Tyson, East Carolina
Preseason Rookie of the Year	Alterique Gilbert, Connecticut

== Rankings ==
Legend
Increase in ranking
Decrease in ranking
Not ranked previous week

		Pre	Wk 2	Wk 3	Wk 4	Wk 5	Wk 6	Wk 7	Wk 8	Wk 9	Wk 10	Wk 11	Wk 12	Wk 13	Wk 14	Wk 15	Wk 16	Wk 17	Wk 18	Wk 19	Final
Cincinnati	AP	RV	24	RV	RV	22	25	24	23	22	22	20	19	14	11	18	17	15	15	18	
Cincinnati	C	25	25	RV	RV	23	23	23	23	22	22	20	19	14	11	17	16	20	18	16	22
Connecticut	AP	18	RV																		
Connecticut	C	16	RV																		
East Carolina	AP																				
East Carolina	C																				
Houston	AP				RV																
Houston	C																				
Memphis	AP																				
Memphis	C																				
SMU	AP		RV								RV	RV	RV	RV	25	19	17	14	12	11	
SMU	C	RV	RV								RV	RV	RV	RV	RV	23	21	19	15	13	23
South Florida	AP																				
South Florida	C																				
Temple	AP				RV	RV															
Temple	C				RV																
Tulane	AP																				
Tulane	C																				
Tulsa	AP																				
Tulsa	C																				
UCF	AP						RV														
UCF	C			RV		RV															

== Conference matrix ==
	Cincinnati	Connecticut	East Carolina	Houston	Memphis	SMU	South Florida	Temple	Tulane	Tulsa	UCF
vs. Cincinnati	—	0–2	0–1	0–2	0–1	1–1	0–2	0–2	0–2	0–2	1–1
vs. Connecticut	2–0	—	1–1	2–0	1–1	2–0	0–2	0–2	0–1	1–0	0–2
vs. East Carolina	1–0	1–1	—	2–0	1–0	2–0	1–1	1–1	0–2	1–1	2–0
vs. Houston	2–0	0–2	0–2	—	1–1	2–0	0–1	0–1	0–2	0–2	1–1
vs. Memphis	1–0	1–1	0–1	1–1	—	2–0	0–2	2–0	0–2	1–1	1–1
vs. SMU	1–1	0–2	0–2	0–2	0–2	—	0–1	0–2	0–2	0–2	0–1
vs. South Florida	2–0	2–0	1–1	1–0	2–0	1–0	—	2–0	2–0	2–0	2–0
vs. Temple	2–0	2–0	1–1	1–0	0–2	2–0	0–2	—	0–2	1–0	2–0
vs. Tulane	2–0	1–0	2–0	2–0	2–0	2–0	0–2	2–0	—	1–1	1–0
vs. Tulsa	2–0	0–1	1–1	2–0	1–1	2–0	0–2	0–1	1–1	—	1–1
vs. UCF	1–1	2–0	0–2	1–1	1–1	1–0	0–2	0–2	0–1	1–1	—
Total	16–2	9–9	6–12	12–6	9–9	17–1	1–17	7–11	3–15	8–10	11–7

== Honors and awards ==
Semi Ojeleye was an honorable mention AP All-American.

=== All-AAC awards and teams ===
On March 7, the AAC announced its conference awards.

Honor	Recipient
Player of the Year	Semi Ojeleye, SMU
Coach of the Year	Tim Jankovich, SMU
Scholar-Athlete of the Year	Semi Ojeleye, SMU
Rookie of the Year	K. J. Lawson, Memphis
Defensive Player of the Year	Tacko Fall, UCF
Most Improved Player	Cameron Reynolds, Tulane
Sixth Man Award	Jarron Cumberland, Cincinnati
Sixth Man Award	Ben Emelogu, SMU
Sportsmanship Award	Troy Caupain, Cincinnati
All-AAC First Team	Jalen Adams, Connecticut
All-AAC First Team	Damyean Dotson, Houston
All-AAC First Team	Rob Gray, Houston
All-AAC First Team	Dedric Lawson, Memphis
All-AAC First Team	Semi Ojeleye, SMU
All-AAC Second Team	Sterling Brown, SMU
All-AAC Second Team	Troy Caupain, Cincinnati
All-AAC Second Team	Shake Milton, SMU
All-AAC Second Team	Ben Moore, SMU
All-AAC Second Team	B. J. Taylor, UCF
All-AAC Second Team	Kyle Washington, Cincinnati
All-Rookie Team	Jarron Cumberland, Cincinnati
All-Rookie Team	Vance Jackson, Connecticut
All-Rookie Team	K. J. Lawson, Memphis
All-Rookie Team	Quinton Rose, Temple
All-Rookie Team	Jeremy Sheppard, East Carolina

== Postseason ==
=== 2017 American Athletic Conference tournament ===
Session	Game	Time*	Matchup	Score	Television	Attendance
First round – Thursday, March 9
1	1	3:30 PM	No. 9 East Carolina vs. No. 8 Temple	80–69	ESPNU	4,874
1	2	6:00 PM	No. 10 Tulane vs. No. 7 Tulsa	60–66	ESPNews	4,874
1	3	8:00 PM	No. 11 South Florida vs. No. 6 Connecticut	66–77	ESPNews	4,874
Quarterfinals – Friday, March 10
2	4	Noon	No. 9 East Carolina vs No. 1 SMU	77–81	ESPN2	1,844
2	5	2:00 PM	No. 5 Memphis vs No. 4 UCF	54–84	ESPN2	1,844
3	6	7:00 PM	No. 7 Tulsa vs No. 2 Cincinnati	61–80	ESPNU	7,365
3	7	9:00 PM	No. 6 Connecticut vs No. 3 Houston	74–65	ESPNU	7,365
Semifinals – Saturday, March 11
4	8	3:00 PM	No. 1 SMU vs No. 4 UCF	70–59	ESPN2	8,117
4	9	5:00 PM	No. 2 Cincinnati vs No. 6 Connecticut	81–71	ESPN2	8,117
Championship – Sunday, March 12
5	10	3:15 PM	No. 1 SMU vs. No. 2 Cincinnati	71–56	ESPN	6,856
*Game times in ET. No. -Rankings denote tournament seeding.

=== NCAA tournament ===
Seed	Region	School	First Four	First Round	Second Round	Sweet Sixteen	Elite Eight	Final Four	Championship
6	East	SMU	N/A	eliminated by (11) USC 65–66					
6	South	Cincinnati	N/A	defeated (11) Kansas State 75–61	eliminated by (3) UCLA 67–79				
		W–L (%):	0–0	1–1 (.500)	0–1 (.000)	0–0	0–0	0–0	0–0 Total: 1–2 (.333)

=== NIT ===
Seed	Bracket	School	First round	Second round	Quarterfinals	Semifinals	Finals
2	California	Houston	eliminated by (7) Akron 75–78				
4	Illinois State	UCF	defeated (5) Colorado 79–74	defeated (1) Illinois State 63–62	defeated (2) Illinois 68–58	eliminated by (4) TCU 53–68	
		W–L (%):	1–1 (.500)	1–0 (1.000)	1–0 (1.000)	0–1 (.000)	0–0 (–) Total: 3–2 (.600)

== NBA draft ==
The following list includes all AAC players who were drafted in the 2017 NBA draft.

Player	Position	School	Round	Pick	Team
Semi Ojeleye	F	SMU	2	37	Boston Celtics
Damyean Dotson	SG	Houston	2	44	New York Knicks
Sterling Brown	SG	SMU	2	46	Philadelphia 76ers
