= 2016–17 SMU Mustangs men's basketball team =

American college basketball season

2016–17 SMU Mustangs men's basketball

AAC regular season and tournament champions

NCAA tournament, First Round
- Conference: American Athletic Conference

Ranking
- Coaches: No. 23
- AP: No. 11
- Record: 30–5 (17–1 AAC)
- Head coach: Tim Jankovich (1st season)
- Assistant coaches: K. T. Turner; Shawn Forrest; Jay Duncan
- Home arena: Moody Coliseum

2016–17 American Athletic Conference men's basketball standings
	Conf.				Overall
Team	W		L	PCT	W		L	PCT
No. 11 SMU †	17	–	1	.944	30	–	5	.857
No. 18 Cincinnati	16	–	2	.889	30	–	6	.833
Houston	12	–	6	.667	21	–	11	.656
UCF	11	–	7	.611	24	–	12	.667
Memphis	9	–	9	.500	19	–	13	.594
UConn	9	–	9	.500	16	–	17	.485
Tulsa	8	–	10	.444	15	–	17	.469
Temple	7	–	11	.389	16	–	16	.500
East Carolina	6	–	12	.333	15	–	18	.455
Tulane	3	–	15	.167	6	–	25	.194
South Florida	1	–	17	.056	7	–	23	.233
† 2017 AAC tournament winner Rankings from AP poll

The 2016–17 SMU Mustangs men's basketball team represented Southern Methodist University (SMU) during the 2016–17 NCAA Division I men's basketball season. The Mustangs were led by first-year head coach Tim Jankovich and played their home games on their campus in University Park, Texas at Moody Coliseum. They were members of the American Athletic Conference. They finished the season 30–5, 17–1 in AAC play to win the AAC regular season championship. In the AAC tournament, they defeated East Carolina, UCF, and Cincinnati to win the tournament championship. As a result, they received the conference's automatic bid to the NCAA tournament. As the No. 6 seed in the East region, they lost in the First Round to #11 USC.

== Previous season ==
The Mustangs finished the 2015–16 season with a record of 25–5, 13–5 in AAC play to finish in second place in conference. Due to multiple NCAA violations, including academic fraud and unethical conduct, SMU was ineligible for all postseason play including the AAC tournament and NCAA tournament. Additionally, head coach Larry Brown was suspended for nine games.

On July 8, 2016, Larry Brown resigned as head coach. A few days later, the school named Tim Jankovich head coach.

== Offseason ==
=== Departures ===
Name	Number	Pos.	Height	Weight	Year	Hometown	Notes
Sedrick Barefield	2	G	6'2"	190	Freshman	Corona, CA	Transferred to Utah
Keith Frazier	4	G	6'5"	190	Junior	Dallas, TX	Transferred to North Texas
Markus Kennedy	5	F	6'9"	245	RS Senior	Philadelphia, PA	Graduated
Nic Moore	11	G	5'9"	170	RS Senior	Winona Lake, IN	Graduated
Jordan Tolbert	23	F	6'7"	240	RS Senior	Fort Worth, TX	Graduated

=== Incoming transfers ===
Name	Number	Pos.	Height	Weight	Year	Hometown	Notes
Jimmy Whitt	31	G	6'4"	173	Sophomore	Columbia, MO	Transferred from Arkansas. Under NCAA transfer rules, Whitt will have to sit out for the 2016–17 season. Will have three years of remaining eligibility. Whitt was a 4-Star Guard (68) overall out of High School.

=== 2016 recruiting class ===
College recruiting
Name	Hometown	School	Height	Weight	Commit date
Dashawn McDowell; PG	Oklahoma City, OK	Southeast High School	6 ft 5 in (1.96 m)	185 lb (84 kg)	Sep 5, 2015
Dashawn McDowell; PG	Recruit ratings: Scout: Rivals: (NR)				
Tom Wilson; SG	Melbourne, Australia	Australian Institute of Sport	6 ft 4 in (1.93 m)	170 lb (77 kg)	Oct 21, 2015
Tom Wilson; SG	Recruit ratings: Scout: Rivals: (NR)				
Harry Froling; PF	Townsville, Australia	Australian Institute of Sport	6 ft 9 in (2.06 m)	220 lb (100 kg)	Jan 25, 2016
Harry Froling; PF	Recruit ratings: Scout: Rivals: (NR)				
Overall recruit ranking:
Note: In many cases, Scout, Rivals, 247Sports, On3, and ESPN may conflict in their listings of height and weight.; In these cases, the average was taken. ESPN grades are on a 100-point scale.; Sources: "2016 SMU Recruiting List". Rivals.; "2016 SMU Recruiting List". Scout.; "2016 SMU Recruiting List". ESPN.; "Scout.com Team Recruiting Rankings". Scout.; "2016 Team Ranking". Rivals.

== Roster ==
2016–17 SMU Mustangs men's basketball team
Players
Coaches

Pos.	#	Name	Height	Weight	Year	Previous school	Hometown
F	00	Ben Moore	6 ft 8 in (2.03 m)	220 lb (100 kg)	Sr	Bolingbrook High School	Bolingbrook, Illinois
G	1	Shake Milton	6 ft 6 in (1.98 m)	205 lb (93 kg)	So	Owasso High School	Owasso, Oklahoma
G	3	Sterling Brown	6 ft 6 in (1.98 m)	230 lb (104 kg)	Sr	Proviso East High School	Maywood, Illinois
G	5	Dashawn McDowell	6 ft 5 in (1.96 m)	185 lb (84 kg)	Fr	Southeast High School	Oklahoma City, Oklahoma
G	10	Jarrey Foster	6 ft 6 in (1.98 m)	220 lb (100 kg)	So	North Shore Senior High School	Houston, Texas
F	14	Courtland Sutton	6 ft 4 in (1.93 m)	215 lb (98 kg)	RS So	Brenham High School	Brenham, Texas
F	15	Leo Kontopoulos (W)	6 ft 9 in (2.06 m)	210 lb (95 kg)	Fr	German School of Thessaloniki	Frankfurt, Germany
G	20	James Pyle (W)	6 ft 3 in (1.91 m)	175 lb (79 kg)	Fr	St. Thomas Aquinas High School	Overland Park, Kansas
G	21	Ben Emelogu	6 ft 5 in (1.96 m)	215 lb (98 kg)	RS Jr	Virginia Tech	Grand Prairie, Texas
G	22	Jonathan Wilfong (W)	6 ft 3 in (1.91 m)	185 lb (84 kg)	Sr	Memphis University School	Memphis, Tennessee
G	31	Jimmy Whitt (I) (redshirt)	6 ft 3 in (1.91 m)	175 lb (79 kg)	So	Arkansas	Columbia, Missouri
F	33	Semi Ojeleye	6 ft 7 in (2.01 m)	235 lb (107 kg)	RS Jr	Duke	Ottawa, Kansas

Head coach

- Tim Jankovich (Kansas State)

Assistant coach(es)

- K. T. Turner (Oklahoma City)
- Shawn Forrest (Arkansas–Pine Bluff)
- Jay Duncan (Northwood)

Legend

- (C) Team captain
- (S) Suspended
- (I) Ineligible
- (W) Walk-on
- Injured
- Current redshirt

Roster
Last update: December 26, 2016

== Schedule and results ==
Date time, TV	Rank^{#}	Opponent^{#}	Result	Record	Site (attendance) city, state
Non-conference regular season
November 11, 2016*; 7:00 pm, ESPN3		Gardner–Webb; 2K Sports Classic	W 72–44	1–0	Moody Coliseum (6,852); Dallas, TX
November 13, 2016*; 1:00 pm, ESPN3		Eastern Michigan; 2K Sports Classic	W 91–64	2–0	Moody Coliseum (6,852); Dallas, TX
November 17, 2016*; 6:00 pm, ESPN2		vs. Pittsburgh; 2K Sports Classic semifinals	W 76–67	3–0	Madison Square Garden (8,126); New York, NY
November 18, 2016*; 6:00 pm, ESPN2		vs. Michigan; 2K Sports Classic championship	L 54–76	3–1	Madison Square Garden (8,088); New York, NY
November 22, 2016*; 8:00 pm, SPCSN/ESPN3		UC Santa Barbara	W 84–57	4–1	Moody Coliseum (6,852); Dallas, TX
November 25, 2016*; 6:00 pm, P12N		at USC	L 73–78	4–2	Galen Center (3,713); Los Angeles, CA
November 30, 2016*; 8:00 pm, MWN		at Boise State	L 62–71	4–3	Taco Bell Arena (4,812); Boise, ID
December 2, 2016*; 7:00 pm, SPCSN/ESPN3		Cal State Bakersfield	W 49–43	5–3	Moody Coliseum (6,852); Dallas, TX
December 4, 2016*; 7:00 pm, SPCSN/ESPN3		Delaware State	W 74–60	6–3	Moody Coliseum (6,852); Dallas, TX
December 7, 2016*; 7:00 pm, ESPNews		TCU	W 74–59	7–3	Moody Coliseum (6,872); Dallas, TX
December 14, 2016*; 7:00 pm, SPCSN/ESPN3		McNeese State	W 92–56	8–3	Moody Coliseum (6,498); Dallas, TX
December 19, 2016*; 8:00 pm, ESPN2		Stanford	W 72–49	9–3	Moody Coliseum (6,923); Dallas, TX
December 20, 2016*; 7:00 pm		Albany	W 71–53	10–3	Moody Coliseum (6,505); Dallas, TX
AAC regular season
December 27, 2016; 8:00 pm, ESPNU		at Memphis	W 58–54	11–3 (1–0)	FedEx Forum (10,305); Memphis, TN
December 31, 2016; 11:00 am, ASN/ESPN3		at East Carolina	W 75–44	12–3 (2–0)	Williams Arena (3,698); Greenville, NC
January 4, 2017; 8:00 pm, CBSSN		Temple	W 79–65	13–3 (3–0)	Moody Coliseum (6,782); Dallas, TX
January 7, 2017; 4:00 pm, ESPNews		South Florida	W 84–65	14–3 (4–0)	Moody Coliseum (6,769); Dallas, TX
January 12, 2017; 8:00 pm, ESPN		at No. 22 Cincinnati	L 64–66	14–4 (4–1)	Fifth Third Arena (11,344); Cincinnati, OH
January 15, 2017; 5:00 pm, CBSSN		at Tulane	W 80–64	15–4 (5–1)	Devlin Fieldhouse (1,323); New Orleans, LA
January 19, 2017; 6:00 pm, ESPN2		UConn	W 69–49	16–4 (6–1)	Moody Coliseum (6,978); Dallas, TX
January 21, 2017; 5:00 pm, ESPNU		Houston	W 85–64	17–4 (7–1)	Moody Coliseum (7,002); Dallas, TX
January 25, 2017; 5:00 pm, ESPNews		at UCF	W 65–60	18–4 (8–1)	CFE Arena (4,620); Orlando, FL
February 1, 2017; 8:00 pm, ESPNews		East Carolina	W 86–46	19–4 (9–1)	Moody Coliseum (6,723); Dallas, TX
February 4, 2017; 6:00 pm, ESPNews		at Tulsa	W 76–53	20–4 (10–1)	Reynolds Center (5,606); Tulsa, OK
February 9, 2017; 8:00 pm, ESPN2	No. 25	at Temple	W 66–50	21–4 (11–1)	Liacouras Center (4,603); Philadelphia, PA
February 12, 2017; 3:00 pm, ESPN	No. 25	No. 11 Cincinnati	W 60–51	22–4 (12–1)	Moody Coliseum (7,518); Dallas, TX
February 15, 2017; 8:00 pm, ASN/ESPN3	No. 19	Tulane	W 80–75	23–4 (13–1)	Moody Coliseum (6,850); Dallas, TX
February 18, 2017; 5:00 pm, ESPN2	No. 19	at Houston	W 76–66	24–4 (14–1)	Hofheinz Pavilion (8,479); Houston, TX
February 25, 2017; 11:00 am, CBS	No. 17	at UConn	W 69–61	25–4 (15–1)	XL Center (13,553); Hartford, CT
March 2, 2017; 7:00 pm, CBSSN	No. 14	Tulsa	W 90–73	26–4 (16–1)	Moody Coliseum (7,242); Dallas, TX
March 4, 2017; 3:00 pm, ESPN2	No. 14	Memphis	W 103–62	27–4 (17–1)	Moody Coliseum (7,242); Dallas, TX
American Athletic Conference tournament
March 10, 2017; 12:00pm, ESPN2	(1) No. 12	vs. (9) East Carolina; Quarterfinals	W 81–77	28–4	XL Center (1,844); Hartford, CT
March 11, 2017; 2:00pm, ESPN2	(1) No. 12	vs. (4) UCF; Semifinals	W 70–59	29–4	XL Center (8,177); Hartford, CT
March 12, 2017; 2:00pm, ESPN	(1) No. 12	vs. (2) No. 15 Cincinnati; Championship	W 71–56	30–4	XL Center (6,856); Hartford, CT
NCAA tournament
March 17, 2017*; 2:10pm, truTV	(6 E) No. 11	vs. (11 E) USC; First Round	L 65–66	30–5	BOK Center (13,571); Tulsa, OK
*Non-conference game. ^{#}Rankings from AP Poll. (#) Tournament seedings in parentheses. E=East Region. All times are in Central Time.

== Rankings ==
Ranking movements Legend: ██ Increase in ranking ██ Decrease in ranking — = Not ranked RV = Received votes
	Week																			
Poll	Pre	1	2	3	4	5	6	7	8	9	10	11	12	13	14	15	16	17	18	Final
AP	—	RV	—	—	—	—	—	—	—	RV	RV	RV	RV	25	19	17	14	12	11	Not released
Coaches'	RV	RV	—	—	—	—	—	—	—	RV	RV	RV	RV	RV	23	21	19	15	13	23
