= 2016–17 Tulsa Golden Hurricane men's basketball team =

American college basketball season

2016–17 Tulsa Golden Hurricane men's basketball
- Conference: American Athletic Conference
- Record: 15–17 (8–10 AAC)
- Head coach: Frank Haith (3rd season)
- Assistant coaches: Dennis Felton; Shea Seals; Kim English
- Home arena: Reynolds Center

2016–17 American Athletic Conference men's basketball standings
	Conf.				Overall
Team	W		L	PCT	W		L	PCT
No. 11 SMU †	17	–	1	.944	30	–	5	.857
No. 18 Cincinnati	16	–	2	.889	30	–	6	.833
Houston	12	–	6	.667	21	–	11	.656
UCF	11	–	7	.611	24	–	12	.667
Memphis	9	–	9	.500	19	–	13	.594
UConn	9	–	9	.500	16	–	17	.485
Tulsa	8	–	10	.444	15	–	17	.469
Temple	7	–	11	.389	16	–	16	.500
East Carolina	6	–	12	.333	15	–	18	.455
Tulane	3	–	15	.167	6	–	25	.194
South Florida	1	–	17	.056	7	–	23	.233
† 2017 AAC tournament winner Rankings from AP poll

The 2016–17 Tulsa Golden Hurricane men's basketball team represented the University of Tulsa during the 2016–17 NCAA Division I men's basketball season. The Golden Hurricane, led by third-year head coach Frank Haith, played their home games at the Reynolds Center in Tulsa, Oklahoma as members of the American Athletic Conference (AAC). They finished the season 15–17, 8–10 in AAC play, to finish in seventh place. They defeated Tulane in the first round of the AAC tournament to advance to the quarterfinals where they lost to Cincinnati.

== Previous season ==
The Golden Hurricane finished the 2015–16 season 20–12, 12–6 in AAC play, to finish in a three-way tie for third place. They lost in the quarterfinals of AAC tournament to Memphis. They received an at-large bid to the NCAA tournament where they lost in the First Four to Michigan.

== Departures ==
Name	Number	Pos.	Height	Weight	Year	Hometown	Notes
Rashad Smith	1	G	6' 7"	205	Senior	Plano, TX	Graduated
Shaquille Harrison	3	G	6' 4"	189	Senior	Kansas City, MO	Graduated
Rashad Ray	5	G	5' 10"	172	Senior	New Orleans, LA	Graduated
James Woodard	10	G	6' 3"	192	Senior	Arcadia, OK	Graduated
Kajon Brown	13	G	6' 4"	185	Freshman	Harvey, LA	Transferred to Lee College
Marquel Curtis	15	G	6' 3"	202	RS Senior	Plymouth, MN	Graduated
Nick Wood	22	G	6' 1"	168	Senior	Tulsa, OK	Walk-on; graduated
D'Andre Wight	40	F	6' 9"	245	Senior	Lawton, OK	Graduated
Brandon Swannegan	44	F	6' 9"	209	Senior	Houston, TX	Graduated
Emmanuel Ezechinonso	55	F	6' 11"	267	Senior	Lagos, Nigeria	Graduated

=== Incoming transfers ===
Name	Number	Pos.	Height	Weight	Year	Hometown	Notes
Curran Scott	10	G	6' 4"	205	Sophomore	Edmond, OK	Transferred from Charlotte. Under NCAA transfer rules, Scott will have to sit out for the 2016–17 season. Will have three years of remaining eligibility.
Jaleel Wheeler	13	G	6' 4"	195	Junior	Newark, NJ	Junior college transferred from Kilgore College
Corey Henderson Jr.	32	G	6' 4"	173	Junior	Dallas, TX	Junior college transferred from Blinn College
Eugene Artison	35	F	6' 9"	202	Sophomore	Seattle, WA	Junior college transferred from College of Southern Idaho

== Class of 2016 commitments ==
College recruiting information
Name	Hometown	School	Height	Weight	Commit date
Travis Atson #59 SF	Brooklyn, NY	Notre Dame Prep	6 ft 3 in (1.91 m)	180 lb (82 kg)	Sep 20, 2015
Travis Atson #59 SF	Recruit ratings: Scout: Rivals: (72)				
Martins Igbanu #51 C	Lagos, Nigeria	Covenant Christian Ministries Academy	6 ft 8 in (2.03 m)	180 lb (82 kg)	Sep 15, 2015
Martins Igbanu #51 C	Recruit ratings: Scout: Rivals: (70)				
Lawson Korita; SG	Little Rock, AR	Pulaski Academy	6 ft 3 in (1.91 m)	180 lb (82 kg)	Jun 30, 2015
Lawson Korita; SG	Recruit ratings: Scout: Rivals: (NR)				
Will Magnay; C	Brisbane, Australia	Australian Institute of Sport	6 ft 10 in (2.08 m)	235 lb (107 kg)	Jan 11, 2016
Will Magnay; C	Recruit ratings: Scout: Rivals: (NR)				
Joseph Battle; SG	Abbeville, SC	Abbeville High School	6 ft 3 in (1.91 m)	180 lb (82 kg)	Feb 25, 2016
Joseph Battle; SG	Recruit ratings: Scout: Rivals: (NR)				
Overall recruit ranking:
Note: In many cases, Scout, Rivals, 247Sports, On3, and ESPN may conflict in their listings of height and weight.; In these cases, the average was taken. ESPN grades are on a 100-point scale.; Sources: "Tulsa 2016 Basketball Commitments". Rivals.; "2016 Team Ranking". Rivals.

== Roster ==
2016–17 Tulsa Golden Hurricane men's basketball team
Players
Coaches

Pos.	#	Name	Height	Weight	Year	Previous school	Hometown
F	0	Junior Etou	6 ft 7 in (2.01 m)	240 lb (109 kg)	RS Jr	Bishop O'Connell HS; Rutgers	Republic of the Congo
F	1	Martins Igbanu	6 ft 8 in (2.03 m)	240 lb (109 kg)	Fr	Covenant Christian Ministries Academy	Lagos, Nigeria
G	2	Cory Haith (W)	5 ft 11 in (1.8 m)	175 lb (79 kg)	RS Sr	Rock Bridge HS; Missouri	Miami, FL
F	3	Travis Atson	6 ft 5 in (1.96 m)	204 lb (93 kg)	Fr	Notre Dame Prep	Brooklyn, NY
G	4	Sterling Taplin	6 ft 1 in (1.85 m)	189 lb (86 kg)	So	St. Thomas More School	Williamsville, NY
G	5	Lawson Korita	5 ft 5 in (1.65 m)	207 lb (94 kg)	Fr	Pulaski Academy	Little Rock, AR
G	10	Curran Scott (redshirt)	6 ft 4 in (1.93 m)	205 lb (93 kg)	So	Edmond Memorial HS; Charlotte	Edmond, OK
G	11	Pat Birt	6 ft 5 in (1.96 m)	182 lb (83 kg)	Sr	Plano East Sr. HS; UIC; South Plains College	Plano, TX
F	12	Will Magnay	6 ft 10 in (2.08 m)	234 lb (106 kg)	Fr	Australian Institute of Sport	Brisbane, Australia
G	13	Jaleel Wheeler	6 ft 4 in (1.93 m)	195 lb (88 kg)	Jr	St. George's School; Kilgore College	Newark, NJ
F	14	TK Edogi	6 ft 8 in (2.03 m)	227 lb (103 kg)	RS Jr	Westwind Prep	Surprise, AZ
G	15	Joseph Battle	6 ft 3 in (1.91 m)	181 lb (82 kg)	Fr	Abbeville HS	Abbeville, SC
G	32	Corey Jr. Henderson	6 ft 4 in (1.93 m)	173 lb (78 kg)	Jr	Episcopal School; Wichita State; Blinn College	Abbeville, SC
F	34	Alex Foree (W)	6 ft 5 in (1.96 m)	202 lb (92 kg)	So	Southside HS	Fort Smith, AR
F	35	Eugene Artison	6 ft 9 in (2.06 m)	202 lb (92 kg)	RS So	Franklin HS; College of Southern Idaho	Seattle, WA

Head coach

- Frank Haith (Elon)

Assistant coach(es)

- Dennis Felton (Howard)
- Shea Seals (Tulsa)
- Kim English (Missouri)

Legend

- (C) Team captain
- (S) Suspended
- (I) Ineligible
- (W) Walk-on
- Injured
- Current redshirt

Roster
Last update: February 21, 2025

== Schedule and results ==
Date time, TV	Rank^{#}	Opponent^{#}	Result	Record	Site (attendance) city, state
Exhibition
November 2, 2016*; 7:00 p.m.		Oklahoma Christian	W 72–53		Reynolds Center (3,240); Tulsa, OK
November 7, 2016*; 7:00 p.m.		Northeastern State	W 84–52		Reynolds Center (3,332); Tulsa, OK
Non-conference regular season
November 11, 2016*; 7:00 p.m., ESPN3		Jacksonville State	L 73–84	0–1	Reynolds Center (3,604); Tulsa, OK
November 16, 2016*; 7:00 p.m., ESPN3		at Wichita State	L 53–80	0–2	Charles Koch Arena (10,506); Wichita, KS
November 19, 2016*; 3:00 p.m., ESPN3		New Orleans	W 77–68	1–2	Reynolds Center (3,271); Tulsa, OK
November 22, 2016*; 8:00 p.m., ESPNews		Oregon State	W 75–64	2–2	Reynolds Center (3,372); Tulsa, OK
November 28, 2016*; 7:00 p.m.		at Oral Roberts; PSO Mayor's Cup	W 79–65	3–2	Mabee Center (4,230); Tulsa, OK
December 3, 2016*; 3:00 p.m.		at Little Rock	L 62–72	3–3	Jack Stephens Center (3,769); Little Rock, AR
December 7, 2016*; 7:00 p.m., ESPN3		Illinois State	W 70–68	4–3	Reynolds Center (3,478); Tulsa, OK
December 10, 2016*; 4:00 p.m., CBSSN		Oklahoma State	L 67–71	4–4	Reynolds Center (7,333); Tulsa, OK
December 17, 2016*; 7:00 p.m., ESPN3		Texas State	W 74–59	5–4	Reynolds Center (3,990); Tulsa, OK
December 22, 2016*; 3:30 p.m., ESPNU		vs. Stephen F. Austin; Diamond Head Classic quarterfinals	W 74–51	6–4	Stan Sheriff Center (5,942); Honolulu, HI
December 23, 2016*; 3:30 p.m., ESPN2		vs. San Diego State; Diamond Head Classic semifinals	L 63–82	6–5	Stan Sheriff Center (5,873); Honolulu, HI
December 25, 2016*; 5:00 p.m., ESPN2		vs. Illinois State; Diamond Head Classic 3rd-place game	L 56–68	6–6	Stan Sheriff Center (6,118); Honolulu, HI
AAC regular season
December 31, 2016; 1:00 p.m., CBSSN		UConn	W 61–59 ^{OT}	7–6 (1–0)	Reynolds Center (4,525); Tulsa, OK
January 4, 2017; 8:00 p.m., ESPNU		at Houston	L 61–64	7–7 (1–1)	Hofheinz Pavilion (3,415); Houston, TX
January 11, 2017; 7:00 p.m., ESPNews		Memphis	W 81–71	8–7 (2–1)	Reynolds Center (4,017); Tulsa, OK
January 14, 2017; 3:00 p.m., ESPNews		at Temple	W 70–68	9–7 (3–1)	Liacouras Center (6,175); Philadelphia, PA
January 18, 2017; 6:30 p.m., ESPNews		Tulane	W 89–82	10–7 (4–1)	Reynolds Center (3,870); Tulsa, OK
January 21, 2017; 12:00 p.m., ESPNews		at South Florida	W 79–67	11–7 (5–1)	USF Sun Dome (2,614); Tampa, FL
January 25, 2017; 6:00 p.m., ESPN3		at East Carolina	L 66–69	11–8 (5–2)	Williams Arena (3,537); Greenville, NC
January 28, 2017; 12:30 p.m., ESPNews		UCF	W 77–66	12–8 (6–2)	Reynolds Center (4,281); Tulsa, OK
February 1, 2017; 8:00 p.m., CBSSN		No. 14 Cincinnati	L 55–57	12–9 (6–3)	Reynolds Center (5,002); Tulsa, OK
February 4, 2017; 6:00 p.m., ESPNews		SMU	L 53–76	12–10 (6–4)	Reynolds Center (5,606); Tulsa, OK
February 7, 2017; 6:00 p.m., ESPNU		at Memphis	L 44–66	12–11 (6–5)	FedEx Forum (8,518); Memphis, TN
February 11, 2017; 5:00 p.m., ESPNU		Houston	L 64–73	12–12 (6–6)	Reynolds Center (4,229); Tulsa, OK
February 14, 2017; 6:00 p.m., ESPNews		at UCF	L 53–71	12–13 (6–7)	CFE Arena (3,528); Orlando, FL
February 18, 2017; 11:00 a.m., ESPNU		at No. 18 Cincinnati	L 60–80	12–14 (6–8)	Fifth Third Arena (13,386); Cincinnati, OH
February 23, 2017; 7:00 p.m., ESPNews		South Florida	W 82–68	13–14 (7–8)	Reynolds Center (3,849); Tulsa, OK
February 26, 2017; 3:00 p.m., ESPNU		East Carolina	W 74–66	14–14 (8–8)	Reynolds Center (4,449); Tulsa, OK
March 2, 2017; 7:00 p.m., CBSSN		at No. 14 SMU	L 70–93	14–15 (8–9)	Moody Coliseum (7,181); Dallas, TX
March 5, 2017; 3:00 p.m., ESPNU		at Tulane	L 69–81	14–16 (8–10)	Devlin Fieldhouse (1,466); New Orleans, LA
AAC tournament
March 9, 2017; 5:00 p.m., ESPNews	(7)	vs. (10) Tulane; First round	W 66–60	15–16	XL Center (4,874); Hartford, CT
March 10, 2017; 6:00 p.m., ESPNU	(7)	vs. (2) No. 15 Cincinnati; Quarterfinals	L 61–80	15–17	XL Center (7,365); Hartford, CT
*Non-conference game. ^{#}Rankings from AP poll. (#) Tournament seedings in parentheses. All times are in Central.
