= 2017 American Athletic Conference men's basketball tournament =

- Tournament Logo
- Classification: Division I
- Season: 2016–17
- Teams: 11
- Site: XL Center; Hartford, Connecticut
- Champions: SMU (2nd title)
- Winning coach: Tim Jankovich (1st title)
- MVP: Semi Ojeleye (SMU)
- Television: ESPN, ESPN2, ESPNU, ESPNews

2016–17 American Athletic Conference men's basketball standings
	Conf.				Overall
Team	W		L	PCT	W		L	PCT
No. 11 SMU †	17	–	1	.944	30	–	5	.857
No. 18 Cincinnati	16	–	2	.889	30	–	6	.833
Houston	12	–	6	.667	21	–	11	.656
UCF	11	–	7	.611	24	–	12	.667
Memphis	9	–	9	.500	19	–	13	.594
UConn	9	–	9	.500	16	–	17	.485
Tulsa	8	–	10	.444	15	–	17	.469
Temple	7	–	11	.389	16	–	16	.500
East Carolina	6	–	12	.333	15	–	18	.455
Tulane	3	–	15	.167	6	–	25	.194
South Florida	1	–	17	.056	7	–	23	.233
† 2017 AAC tournament winner Rankings from AP poll

The 2017 American Athletic Conference men's basketball tournament was the conference tournament for the American Athletic Conference during the 2016–17 NCAA Division I men's basketball season. It was held March 9–12, 2017, at the XL Center in Hartford, Connecticut. Originally, the Amway Center in Orlando, Florida (host of the 2016 Tournament) was slated to host the tournament for a second consecutive year, but in November 2014, the NCAA awarded the Amway Center with first and second-round games for the 2017 NCAA Division I men's basketball tournament As a result, the XL Center hosted the tournament in 2017, with the tournament returning to Orlando in 2018.

== Seeds ==
Teams are seeded by conference record, with ties broken by record between the tied teams followed by record against the regular-season champion, if necessary.

Seed	School	Conference	Tiebreaker
1	SMU	17–1	
2	Cincinnati	16–2	
3	Houston	12–6	
4	UCF	11–7	
5	Memphis	9–9	1–1 vs Houston
6	UConn	9–9	0–2 vs Houston
7	Tulsa	8–10	
8	Temple	7–11	
9	East Carolina	6–12	
10	Tulane	3–15	
11	South Florida	1–17	

== Schedule ==
Session	Game	Time*	Matchup^{#}	Score	Television	Attendance
First round – Thursday, March 9
1	1	3:30 PM	#9 East Carolina vs. #8 Temple	80–69	ESPNU	4,874
1	2	6:00 PM	#10 Tulane vs. #7 Tulsa	60–66	ESPNews	4,874
1	3	8:00 PM	#11 South Florida vs. #6 UConn	66–77	ESPNews	4,874
Quarterfinals – Friday, March 10
2	4	Noon	#9 East Carolina vs #1 SMU	77–81	ESPN2	1,844
2	5	2:00 PM	#5 Memphis vs #4 UCF	54–84	ESPN2	1,844
3	6	7:00 PM	#7 Tulsa vs #2 Cincinnati	61–80	ESPNU	7,365
3	7	9:00 PM	#6 UConn vs #3 Houston	74–65	ESPNU	7,365
Semifinals – Saturday, March 11
4	8	3:00 PM	#1 SMU vs #4 UCF	70–59	ESPN2	8,117
4	9	5:00 PM	#2 Cincinnati vs #6 UConn	81–71	ESPN2	8,117
Championship – Sunday, March 12
5	10	3:15 PM	#1 SMU vs. #2 Cincinnati	71–56	ESPN	6,856
*Game times in ET. #-Rankings denote tournament seeding.

== Bracket ==
First round Thursday, March 9
8	Temple	69
9	East Carolina	80
7	Tulsa	66
10	Tulane	60
6	UConn	77
11	South Florida	66

Quarterfinals; Friday, March 10
1	SMU	81
9	East Carolina	77
4	UCF	84
5	Memphis	54
2	Cincinnati	80
7	Tulsa	61
3	Houston	65
6	UConn	74

Semifinals; Saturday, March 11
1	SMU	70
4	UCF	59
2	Cincinnati	81
6	UConn	71

Championship; Sunday, March 12
1	SMU	71
2	Cincinnati	56
