= 2016–17 Houston Cougars men's basketball team =

American college basketball season

2016–17 Houston Cougars men's basketball

Gulf Coast Showcase champions

NIT, First Round
- Conference: American Athletic Conference
- Record: 21–11 (12–6 AAC)
- Head coach: Kelvin Sampson (3rd season)
- Assistant coaches: Alvin Brooks; Talvin Hester; Kellen Sampson
- Home arena: Hofheinz Pavilion

2016–17 American Athletic Conference men's basketball standings
	Conf.				Overall
Team	W		L	PCT	W		L	PCT
No. 11 SMU †	17	–	1	.944	30	–	5	.857
No. 18 Cincinnati	16	–	2	.889	30	–	6	.833
Houston	12	–	6	.667	21	–	11	.656
UCF	11	–	7	.611	24	–	12	.667
Memphis	9	–	9	.500	19	–	13	.594
UConn	9	–	9	.500	16	–	17	.485
Tulsa	8	–	10	.444	15	–	17	.469
Temple	7	–	11	.389	16	–	16	.500
East Carolina	6	–	12	.333	15	–	18	.455
Tulane	3	–	15	.167	6	–	25	.194
South Florida	1	–	17	.056	7	–	23	.233
† 2017 AAC tournament winner Rankings from AP poll

The 2016–17 Houston Cougars men's basketball team represented the University of Houston during the 2016–17 NCAA Division I men's basketball season. The Cougars were led by third-year head coach Kelvin Sampson and were members of the American Athletic Conference. The Cougars played their home games at Hofheinz Pavilion. They finished the season 21–11, 12–6 in AAC play to finish in third place. They lost to UConn in the quarterfinals of the AAC tournament. They received an at-large bid to the National Invitation Tournament as a No. 2 seed and lost in the first round to Akron.

== Previous season ==
The Cougars finished the 2015–16 season with a record of 22–11, 12–6 in AAC play to finish in a tie for third place in conference. They lost in the quarterfinals of the AAC tournament to Tulane. They received a bid to the National Invitation Tournament where they lost to Georgia Tech in the first round.

== Offseason ==
=== Departures ===
Name	Number	Pos.	Height	Weight	Year	Hometown	Notes
Ronnie Johnson	3	G	6'0"	180	RS Junior	Indianapolis, IN	Graduate transferred to Auburn
LeRon Barnes	4	G	6'5"	195	RS Senior	Stonewall, LA	Graduated
L. J. Rose	5	G	6'3"	200	Senior	Houston, TX	Graduate transferred to BYU
Eric Weary, Jr.	23	G	6'4"	210	Senior	New Orleans, LA	Graduated
Devonta Pollard	24	F	6'8"	200	Senior	Porterville, MS	Graduated

=== Incoming transfers ===
Name	Number	Pos.	Height	Weight	Year	Hometown	Previous School
Morris Dunnigan	5	G	6'3"	195	Junior	Joliet, IL	Junior college transferred from Blinn College
Devin Davis	15	F	6'7"	230	Junior	Indianapolis, IN	Junior college transferred from Odessa College
Valentine Sangoyomi	20	C	6'11"	250	Junior	Lagos, Nigeria	Junior college transferred from Northern Oklahoma College

=== Class of 2016 signees ===
College recruiting information
Name	Hometown	School	Height	Weight	Commit date
Armoni Brooks; SG	Round Rock, TX	McNeil High School	6 ft 4 in (1.93 m)	180 lb (82 kg)	Sep 6, 2015
Armoni Brooks; SG	Recruit ratings: Scout: Rivals: (NR)				
Overall recruit ranking: Scout: NR Rivals: NR ESPN: NR
Note: In many cases, Scout, Rivals, 247Sports, On3, and ESPN may conflict in their listings of height and weight.; In these cases, the average was taken. ESPN grades are on a 100-point scale.; Sources: "Houston Basketball Commitment List". Rivals.; "2016 Houston Basketball Commitment List". Scout.; "ESPN". ESPN.; "Scout.com Team Recruiting Rankings". Scout.; "2016 Team Ranking". Rivals.

=== Class of 2017 signees ===
College recruiting information (2017)
Name	Hometown	School	Height	Weight	Commit date
Michael Adewunmi; SG	Mansfield, TX	Lake Ridge High School	6 ft 4 in (1.93 m)	190 lb (86 kg)	Aug 1, 2016
Michael Adewunmi; SG	Recruit ratings: Scout: Rivals: (NR)				
Fabian White Jr. PF	Humble, TX	Atascocita High School	6 ft 8 in (2.03 m)	210 lb (95 kg)	Sep 11, 2016
Fabian White Jr. PF	Recruit ratings: Scout: Rivals: (82)				
Overall recruit ranking: Scout: NR Rivals: NR ESPN: NR
Note: In many cases, Scout, Rivals, 247Sports, On3, and ESPN may conflict in their listings of height and weight.; In these cases, the average was taken. ESPN grades are on a 100-point scale.; Sources: "Houston Basketball Commitment List". Rivals.; "2017 Houston Basketball Commitment List". Scout.; "ESPN". ESPN.; "Scout.com Team Recruiting Rankings". Scout.; "2017 Team Ranking". Rivals.

== Roster ==
2016–17 Houston Cougars men's basketball team
Players
Coaches

Pos.	#	Name	Height	Weight	Year	Previous school	Hometown
F	0	Danrad Knowles	6 ft 10 in (2.08 m)	200 lb (91 kg)	RS Sr	Homeschool Christian Youth Association	Nassau, Bahamas
F	1	Xavier Dupree	6 ft 9 in (2.06 m)	210 lb (95 kg)	Sr	Paris Junior College	Houston, Texas
G	3	Armoni Brooks	6 ft 4 in (1.93 m)	180 lb (82 kg)	Fr	McNeil High School	Round Rock, Texas
G	5	Morris Dunnigan	6 ft 3 in (1.91 m)	195 lb (88 kg)	Jr	Blinn College	Joliet, Illinois
G	12	Wes VanBeck (W)	6 ft 2 in (1.88 m)	190 lb (86 kg)	Jr	Westside High School	Houston, Texas
C	13	Bertrand Nkali	6 ft 9 in (2.06 m)	235 lb (107 kg)	RS Sr	Lee College	Bertoua, Cameroon
F	15	Devin Davis	6 ft 7 in (2.01 m)	230 lb (104 kg)	RS Jr	Odessa College	Indianapolis, Indiana
C	20	Valentine Sangoyomi	6 ft 9 in (2.06 m)	250 lb (113 kg)	Jr	Northern Oklahoma College	Lagos, Nigeria
G	21	Damyean Dotson	6 ft 5 in (1.96 m)	210 lb (95 kg)	RS Sr	Oregon	Houston, Texas
G	25	Galen Robinson Jr.	6 ft 1 in (1.85 m)	190 lb (86 kg)	So	Westbury Christian School	Houston, Texas
G	30	Mateen Hirbod (W)	6 ft 2 in (1.88 m)	185 lb (84 kg)	Fr	The Bentley School	Danville, California
G	32	Rob Gray	6 ft 2 in (1.88 m)	185 lb (84 kg)	RS Jr	Howard College	Forest City, North Carolina
C	33	Kyle Meyer	6 ft 10 in (2.08 m)	230 lb (104 kg)	RS Sr	Eastern Florida State College	Atlanta, Georgia

Head coach

- Kelvin Sampson (UNC Pembroke)

Assistant coach(es)

- Alvin Brooks (Lamar)
- Talvin Hester (Texas Wesleyan)
- Kellen Sampson (Oklahoma)

Legend

- (C) Team captain
- (S) Suspended
- (I) Ineligible
- (W) Walk-on
- Injured
- Current redshirt

Roster

== Schedule and results ==
Date time, TV	Rank^{#}	Opponent^{#}	Result	Record	Site (attendance) city, state
Exhibition
11/05/2016*; 7:00 pm		UNC Pembroke	W 94–67		Hofheinz Pavilion (2,611); Houston, TX
11/16/2016*; 7:00 pm		Angelo State	W 84–72		Hofheinz Pavilion (2,695); Houston, TX
Non-conference regular season
11/11/2016*; 7:00 pm, ESPN3		Morgan State	W 93–52	1–0	Hofheinz Pavilion (3,005); Houston, TX
11/21/2016*; 6:30 pm		vs. George Mason; Gulf Coast Showcase quarterfinals	W 93–56	2–0	Germain Arena (1,000); Estero, FL
11/22/2016*; 6:30 pm		vs. South Dakota; Gulf Coast Showcase semifinals	W 85–58	3–0	Germain Arena (1,000); Estero, FL
11/23/2016*; 6:30 p.m.		vs. Vermont; Gulf Coast Showcase final	W 72–71	4–0	Germain Arena (1,000); Estero, FL
11/26/2016*; 4:00 pm, ESPN3		Cornell	W 83–53	5–0	Hofheinz Pavilion (3,223); Houston, TX
11/29/2016*; 8:00 pm, SECN		at LSU	L 65–84	5–1	Maravich Center (6,695); Baton Rouge, LA
12/03/2016*; 4:00 pm, ESPN3		Prairie View A&M	W 105–61	6–1	Hofheinz Pavilion (3,091); Houston, TX
12/06/2016*; 6:00 pm, SECN		at Arkansas	L 72–84	6–2	Bud Walton Arena (13,455); Fayetteville, AR
12/10/2016*; 12:30 pm, ESPNU		Rhode Island	W 82–77	7–2	Hofheinz Pavilion (3,371); Houston, TX
12/17/2016*; 4:00 pm, ESPN3		Texas–Rio Grande Valley	W 83–58	8–2	Hofheinz Pavilion (2,856); Houston, TX
12/21/2016*; 7:00 pm, ASN		Liberty	W 77–54	9–2	Hofheinz Pavilion (3,540); Houston, TX
12/23/2016*; 7:00 pm, ESPN2		Harvard	L 56–57	9–3	Hofheinz Pavilion (4,004); Houston, TX
AAC regular season
12/28/2016; ESPN2		at UConn	W 62–46	10–3 (1–0)	XL Center (11,538); Hartford, CT
12/31/2016; 11:00 am, ESPNU		at South Florida	W 70–56	11–3 (2–0)	USF Sun Dome (2,353); Tampa, FL
01/04/2017; 8:00 pm, ESPNU		Tulsa	W 64–61	12–3 (3–0)	Hofheinz Pavilion (3,415); Houston, TX
01/07/2017; 8:00 pm, ESPNU		No. 22 Cincinnati	L 58–67	12–4 (3–1)	Hofheinz Pavilion (4,875); Houston, TX
01/11/2017; 5:00 pm, ESPNews		at East Carolina	W 74–58	13–4 (4–1)	Williams Arena (4,197); Greenville, NC
01/14/2017; 3:00 pm, CBSSN		at UCF	L 70–77	13–5 (4–2)	CFE Arena (5,489); Orlando, FL
01/19/2017; 8:00 pm, CBSSN		Memphis	L 67–70 ^{OT}	13–6 (4–3)	Hofheinz Pavilion (4,815); Houston, TX
01/21/2017; 5:00 pm, ESPNU		at SMU	L 64–85	13–7 (4–4)	Moody Coliseum (7,002); Dallas, TX
01/24/2017; 8:00 pm, CBSSN		Tulane	W 65–51	14–7 (5–4)	Hofheinz Pavilion (3,421); Houston, TX
01/28/2017; 9:00 pm, ESPNU		Temple	W 79–66	15–7 (6–4)	Hofheinz Pavilion (3,627); Houston, TX
02/01/2017; 6:00 pm, ESPNU		UCF	W 82–64	16–7 (7–4)	Hofheinz Pavilion (3,681); Houston, TX
02/08/2017; 7:00 pm, ESPNews		at Tulane	W 91–62	17–7 (8–4)	Devlin Fieldhouse (1,165); New Orleans, LA
02/11/2017; 5:00 pm, ESPNU		at Tulsa	W 73–64	18–7 (9–4)	Reynolds Center (4,229); Tulsa, OK
02/18/2017; 5:00 pm, ESPN2		No. 19 SMU	L 66–76	18–8 (9–5)	Hofheinz Pavilion (8,479); Houston, TX
02/22/2017; 8:00 pm, CBSSN		UConn	W 75–70	19–8 (10–5)	Hofheinz Pavilion (4,131); Houston, TX
02/26/2017; 4:00 pm, CBSSN		at Memphis	W 72–71	20–8 (11–5)	FedEx Forum (12,381); Memphis, TN
03/02/2017; 6:00 pm, ESPN2		at No. 18 Cincinnati	L 47–65	20–9 (11–6)	Fifth Third Arena (13,176); Cincinnati, OH
03/05/2017; 3:00 pm, CBSSN		East Carolina	W 73–51	21–9 (12–6)	Hofheinz Pavilion (8,479); Houston, TX
AAC tournament
03/10/2017; 9:00 pm, ESPNU	(3)	vs. (6) UConn; Quarterfinals	L 65–74	21–10	XL Center (7,365); Hartford, CT
NIT
03/15/2017*; 6:30 pm, ESPNU	(2)	(7) Akron; First round – California Bracket	L 75–78	21–11	Health and Physical Education Arena (1,928); Houston, TX
*Non-conference game. ^{#}Rankings from AP Poll. (#) Tournament seedings in parentheses. All times are in Central Time.
