= 2016–17 Memphis Tigers men's basketball team =

American college basketball season

2016–17 Memphis Tigers men's basketball
- Conference: American Athletic Conference
- Record: 19–13 (9–9 AAC)
- Head coach: Tubby Smith (1st season)
- Assistant coaches: Joe Esposito; Pooh Williamson; Saul Smith
- Home arena: FedExForum

2016–17 American Athletic Conference men's basketball standings
| | Conf. | | | | Overall |
| Team | W | | L | PCT | W | | L | PCT |
|---|---|---|---|---|---|---|---|---|
| No. 11 SMU † | 17 | – | 1 | .944 | 30 | – | 5 | .857 |
| No. 18 Cincinnati | 16 | – | 2 | .889 | 30 | – | 6 | .833 |
| Houston | 12 | – | 6 | .667 | 21 | – | 11 | .656 |
| UCF | 11 | – | 7 | .611 | 24 | – | 12 | .667 |
| Memphis | 9 | – | 9 | .500 | 19 | – | 13 | .594 |
| UConn | 9 | – | 9 | .500 | 16 | – | 17 | .485 |
| Tulsa | 8 | – | 10 | .444 | 15 | – | 17 | .469 |
| Temple | 7 | – | 11 | .389 | 16 | – | 16 | .500 |
| East Carolina | 6 | – | 12 | .333 | 15 | – | 18 | .455 |
| Tulane | 3 | – | 15 | .167 | 6 | – | 25 | .194 |
| South Florida | 1 | – | 17 | .056 | 7 | – | 23 | .233 |
† 2017 AAC tournament winner Rankings from AP poll

The 2016–17 Memphis Tigers men's basketball team represented the University of Memphis in the 2016–17 NCAA Division I men's basketball season, the 96th season of Tiger basketball and the first under head coach Tubby Smith. The Tigers played their home games at the FedExForum. This was the fourth season the Tigers participated in the American Athletic Conference. They finished the season 19–13, 9–9 in AAC play to finish in a tie for fifth place. They lost in the quarterfinals of the AAC tournament to UCF. Despite having 19 wins, they did not participate in a postseason tournament.

== Previous season ==
The Tigers finished the 2015–16 season with a record of 19–15 and 8–10 in AAC play to finish in a tie for fifth place in conference. The Tigers lost in the championship game of the AAC tournament to UConn. The Tigers did not participate in a postseason tournament marking the second consecutive year that the Tigers had missed the postseason entirely.

Josh Pastner left Memphis to take the head coaching job at Georgia Tech on April 8, 2016. On April 14, 2016, the school hired Tubby Smith to take over as head coach.

== Offseason ==
=== Departures ===
| Name | Number | Pos. | Height | Weight | Year | Hometown | Notes |
|---|---|---|---|---|---|---|---|
| Trahson Burrell | 0 | F | 6' 7" | 187 | Senior | Albany, NY | Graduated |
| Shaq Goodwin | 2 | F | 6' 9" | 229 | Senior | Atlanta, GA | Graduated |
| Avery Woodson | 3 | G | 6' 2" | 189 | Junior | Waynesboro, MS | Transferred to Butler |
| Randall Broddie | 11 | G | 6' 3" | 170 | Freshman | Oxon Hill, MD | Transferred to Navarro College |
| Kedren Johnson | 15 | G | 6' 4" | 210 | Senior | Lewisburg, TN | Graduated |
| Ricky Tarrant | 20 | G | 6' 2" | 184 | Senior | Pleasant Grove, AL | Graduated |
| Nick Marshall | 30 | C | 6' 11" | 248 | Sophomore | Lexington, TN | Left program; transferred to Motlow State CC |

=== Incoming transfers ===
| Name | Num | Pos. | Height | Weight | Year | Hometown | Notes |
|---|---|---|---|---|---|---|---|
| Christian Kessee | 10 | G | 6' 2" | 180 | Senior | Las Vegas, NV | Graduate transfer from Coppin State |

=== Recruiting ===
College recruiting information
| Name | Hometown | School | Height | Weight | Commit date |
|---|---|---|---|---|---|
| Keon Clergeot; G | Auburndale, FL | Auburndale HS | 6 ft 1 in (1.85 m) | 165 lb (75 kg) | Jun 8, 2016 |
| Keon Clergeot; G | Recruit ratings: Scout: Rivals: 247Sports: ESPN: | | | | |
| Jimario Rivers; F | Memphis, TN | Southwest TN CC | 6 ft 8 in (2.03 m) | 190 lb (86 kg) | Oct 8, 2015 |
| Jimario Rivers; F | Recruit ratings: 247Sports: ESPN: | | | | |
Overall recruit ranking:
Note: In many cases, Scout, Rivals, 247Sports, On3, and ESPN may conflict in their listings of height and weight.; In these cases, the average was taken. ESPN grades are on a 100-point scale.; Sources: "2016 Team Ranking". Rivals.

== Coaching staff ==
The Tigers hired coach Orlando "Tubby" Smith to replace Josh Pastner in April 2016. Smith faced his first controversy as Tiger head coach early. Keelon Lawson, father of Tiger players KJ and Dedric Lawson, had served for two years as an assistant for Pastner, but Smith did not initially want to retain Lawson in that role to make room for his son on the staff. This caused Lawson to reenter his son Dedric in the 2016 draft and hint that KJ would be transferring. However, on April 25, 2016, The Commercial Appeal reported that Lawson would be retained on the basketball staff as director of player personnel. By moving Lawson to Director of player development it prevents him from recruiting off campus. Where his close ties to area coaches and talent would give him an advantage with Memphis area recruits. An area where Smith and his staff has been very weak in past jobs. With a recruiting class average in the 70s at Texas Tech. His first class at Memphis was ranked 92nd compared to the top 10 class in Pastner's last year at Memphis- Lawson claimed he never intended to indicate that his sons would be leaving the program upon the announcement of his reassignment. Dedric, however, remained entered in the draft and attended the draft combine before withdrawing his name in mid May and returning to Memphis.

The U of M announced that presumptive starting center Nick Marshall unexpectedly left the team on August 1, 2016, when he went to live with his pregnant girlfriend. Marshall was not expected to return to Memphis.

== Roster ==
2016–17 Memphis Tigers men's basketball team
Players
Coaches

| Pos. | # | Name | Height | Weight | Year | Previous school | Hometown |
|---|---|---|---|---|---|---|---|
| G/F | 0 | K. J. Lawson | 6 ft 7 in (2.01 m) | 210 lb (95 kg) | RS Fr | Hamilton High School | Memphis, Tennessee |
| G/F | 1 | Dedric Lawson | 6 ft 9 in (2.06 m) | 236 lb (107 kg) | So | Hamilton High School | Memphis, Tennessee |
| G/F | 2 | Jimario Rivers | 6 ft 8 in (2.03 m) | 193 lb (88 kg) | Jr | Southwest Tennessee Community College | Clarksville, Tennessee |
| G | 3 | Jeremiah Martin | 6 ft 3 in (1.91 m) | 180 lb (82 kg) | So | Mitchell High School | Memphis, Tennessee |
| G | 4 | Keon Clergeot | 6 ft 1 in (1.85 m) | 187 lb (85 kg) | Fr | Auburndale High School | Winter Haven, Florida |
| G | 5 | Markel Crawford | 6 ft 5 in (1.96 m) | 208 lb (94 kg) | RS Jr | Melrose High School | Memphis, Tennessee |
| G | 10 | Christian Kessee | 6 ft 1 in (1.85 m) | 182 lb (83 kg) | Sr | Coppin State | Las Vegas, Nevada |
| G | 11 | Jonathan Bins | 5 ft 11 in (1.8 m) | 150 lb (68 kg) | Fr | Germantown High School | Memphis, Tennessee |
| G | 12 | Craig Randall II | 6 ft 4 in (1.93 m) | 184 lb (83 kg) | So | Shadow Mountain High School | Youngstown, Ohio |
| F | 15 | Chad Rykhoek | 6 ft 11 in (2.11 m) | 230 lb (104 kg) | Sr | Baylor | Fort Worth, Texas |
| G | 20 | Kaleb Castro | 5 ft 10 in (1.78 m) | 165 lb (75 kg) | So | Collin College | Grapevine, Texas |
| F | 23 | Karim Sameh Azab | 6 ft 11 in (2.11 m) | 290 lb (132 kg) | Fr | Hales Franciscan High School | Giza, Egypt |
| G | 30 | Kytrel Williams | 6 ft 3 in (1.91 m) | 207 lb (94 kg) | Jr | Motlow State Community College | Memphis, Tennessee |
| F | 32 | Alex Moffatt | 6 ft 5 in (1.96 m) | 223 lb (101 kg) | Jr | Shawnee State | Somerville, Tennessee |
| G/F | 42 | Jake McDowell | 6 ft 5 in (1.96 m) | 218 lb (99 kg) | Sr | Christian Brothers High School | Memphis, Tennessee |

Head coach

- Tubby Smith (High Point)

Assistant coach(es)

- Pooh Williamson (Tulsa)
- Joe Esposito (Marist)
- Saul Smith (Kentucky)

Legend

- (C) Team captain
- (S) Suspended
- (I) Ineligible
- (W) Walk-on
- Injured
- Current redshirt

Roster

== Schedule and results ==
| Date time, TV | Rank^{#} | Opponent^{#} | Result | Record | Site (attendance) city, state |
Exhibition
| 11/07/2016*; 6:30 pm | | Christian Brothers | W 69–42 | | FedEx Forum (9,676); Memphis, TN |
Regular season
| 11/14/2016*; 7:00 pm, WLMT/ESPN3 | | Texas–Rio Grande Valley; Emerald Coast Classic | W 94–75 | 1–0 | FedEx Forum (9,217); Memphis, TN |
| 11/16/2016*; 7:00 pm, ESPN3 | | Milwaukee | W 68–54 | 2–0 | FedEx Forum (9,398); Memphis, TN |
| 11/19/2016*; 11:00 am, ESPN3 | | Savannah State; Emerald Coast Classic | W 99–86 | 3–0 | FedEx Forum (8,689); Memphis, TN |
| 11/22/2016*; 7:00 pm, ESPN3 | | McNeese State | W 104–65 | 4–0 | FedEx Forum (8,941); Memphis, TN |
| 11/25/2016*; 8:30 pm, CBSSN | | vs. Providence; Emerald Coast Classic quarterfinals | L 51–60 | 4–1 | The Arena at NWFSC (2,196); Niceville, FL |
| 11/26/2016*; 3:00 pm | | vs. Iowa; Emerald Coast Classic 3rd place game | W 100–92 | 5–1 | The Arena at NWFSC (2,196); Niceville, FL |
| 11/30/2016*; 8:30 pm, WLMT/ESPN3 | | Jackson State | W 84–69 | 6–1 | FedEx Forum (7,507); Memphis, TN |
| 12/03/2016*; 12:00 pm | | at Ole Miss | L 77–85 | 6–2 | The Pavilion at Ole Miss (7,411); Oxford, MS |
| 12/10/2016*; 12:00 pm, ESPN3 | | UAB | W 62–55 | 7–2 | FedEx Forum (9,424); Memphis, TN |
| 12/13/2016*; 8:00 pm, WLMT/ESPN3 | | Monmouth | L 79–82 | 7–3 | FedEx Forum (7,831); Memphis, TN |
| 12/17/2016*; 11:30 am, CBS | | at Oklahoma | W 99–94 ^{OT} | 8–3 | Lloyd Noble Center (9,081); Norman, OK |
| 12/21/2016*; 7:00 pm, ESPN3 | | Incarnate Word | W 95–71 | 9–3 | FedEx Forum (7,919); Memphis, TN |
| 12/27/2016; 8:00 pm, ESPNU | | SMU | L 54–58 | 9–4 (0–1) | FedEx Forum (10,305); Memphis, TN |
| 12/30/2016*; 8:00 pm, ESPN2 | | South Carolina | W 70–54 | 10–4 | FedEx Forum (10,812); Memphis, TN |
| 01/05/2017; 6:00 pm, ESPN2 | | UConn | W 70–61 | 11–4 (1–1) | FedEx Forum (10,227); Memphis, TN |
| 01/08/2017; 4:00 pm, ESPN3 | | at Tulane | W 80–59 | 12–4 (2–1) | Devlin Fieldhouse (1,525); New Orleans, LA |
| 01/11/2017; 7:00 pm, ESPNews | | at Tulsa | L 71–81 | 12–5 (2–2) | Reynolds Center (4,017); Tulsa, OK |
| 01/14/2017; 5:00 pm, CBSSN | | South Florida | W 62–56 | 13–5 (3–2) | FedEx Forum (11,955); Memphis, TN |
| 01/19/2017; 8:00 pm, CBSSN | | at Houston | W 70–67 ^{OT} | 14–5 (4–2) | Hofheinz Pavilion (4,815); Houston, TX |
| 01/22/2017; 3:00 pm, CBSSN | | UCF | W 70–65 | 15–5 (5–2) | FedEx Forum (9,625); Memphis, TN |
| 01/25/2017; 5:00 pm, CBSSN | | at Temple | L 66–77 | 15–6 (5–3) | Liacouras Center (4,950); Philadelphia, PA |
| 01/28/2017; 2:30 pm, ESPNews | | East Carolina | W 57–50 | 16–6 (6–3) | FedEx Forum (10,684); Memphis, TN |
| 02/02/2017; 6:00 pm, ESPNews | | at South Florida | W 85–75 | 17–6 (7–3) | USF Sun Dome (2,563); Tampa, FL |
| 02/05/2017; 4:00 pm, ESPNews | | at UCF | L 57–72 | 17–7 (7–4) | CFE Arena (5,463); Orlando, FL |
| 02/07/2017; 6:00 pm, ESPNU | | Tulsa | W 66–44 | 18–7 (8–4) | FedEx Forum (8,518); Memphis, TN |
| 02/12/2017; 1:00 pm, CBSSN | | Temple | L 62–74 | 18–8 (8–5) | FedEx Forum (10,552); Memphis, TN |
| 02/16/2017; 8:00 pm, ESPN2 | | at UConn | L 62–65 | 18–9 (8–6) | XL Center (9,631); Hartford, CT |
| 02/23/2017; 6:00 pm, ESPN | | at No. 15 Cincinnati | L 74–87 | 18–10 (8–7) | Fifth Third Arena (12,787); Cincinnati, OH |
| 02/26/2017; 4:00 pm, CBSSN | | Houston | L 71–72 | 18–11 (8–8) | FedEx Forum (12,381); Memphis, TN |
| 03/02/2017; 8:00 pm, ESPNU | | Tulane | W 92–70 | 19–11 (9–8) | FedEx Forum (9,223); Memphis, TN |
| 03/04/2017; 3:00 pm, ESPN2 | | at No. 14 SMU | L 62–103 | 19–12 (9–9) | Moody Coliseum (7,242); Dallas, TX |
American Athletic Conference tournament
| 03/10/2017; 1:00 pm, ESPN2 | (5) | vs. (4) UCF; Quarterfinals | L 54–84 | 19–13 | XL Center (1,844); Hartford, CT |
*Non-conference game. ^{#}Rankings from AP Poll. (#) Tournament seedings in parentheses. All times are in Central Time.
