= 2016–17 Temple Owls men's basketball team =

American college basketball season

2016–17 Temple Owls men's basketball

NIT Season Tip-Off champions
- Conference: American Athletic Conference
- Record: 16–16 (7–11 AAC)
- Head coach: Fran Dunphy (11th season)
- Assistant coaches: Dwayne Killings; Aaron McKie; Shawn Trice
- Home arena: Liacouras Center

2016–17 American Athletic Conference men's basketball standings
	Conf.				Overall
Team	W		L	PCT	W		L	PCT
No. 11 SMU †	17	–	1	.944	30	–	5	.857
No. 18 Cincinnati	16	–	2	.889	30	–	6	.833
Houston	12	–	6	.667	21	–	11	.656
UCF	11	–	7	.611	24	–	12	.667
Memphis	9	–	9	.500	19	–	13	.594
UConn	9	–	9	.500	16	–	17	.485
Tulsa	8	–	10	.444	15	–	17	.469
Temple	7	–	11	.389	16	–	16	.500
East Carolina	6	–	12	.333	15	–	18	.455
Tulane	3	–	15	.167	6	–	25	.194
South Florida	1	–	17	.056	7	–	23	.233
† 2017 AAC tournament winner Rankings from AP poll

The 2016–17 Temple Owls men's basketball team represented Temple University during the 2016–17 NCAA Division I men's basketball season. The Owls, led by 11th-year head coach Fran Dunphy, played their home games at the Liacouras Center in Philadelphia, Pennsylvania as members of the American Athletic Conference. They finished the season 16–16, 7–11 in AAC play, in eighth place.

They lost in the first round of the AAC tournament to East Carolina.

== Previous season ==
The Owls finished the 2015–16 season with a record 21–12, 14–4 in AAC play to win the regular season championship. They defeated South Florida in the first round of the AAC tournament to advance to the semifinals, where they lost to UConn. They received an at-large bid as a No. 10 seed to the NCAA tournament, where they lost in overtime in the First Round to Iowa by a buzzer beater from Adam Woodbury.

== Departures ==
Name	Number	Pos.	Height	Weight	Year	Hometown	Notes
Jaylen Bond	15	F	6'8"	240	RS senior	Philadelphia, PA	Graduated
Devontae Watson	23	F/C	6'10"	215	Senior	Ambrige, PA	Graduated
Quenton DeCosey	25	G	6'5"	180	Senior	Union, NJ	Graduated
Devin Coleman	34	G	6'2"	205	RS senior	Philadelphia, PA	Graduated
Chima Nwakpuda	50	F	6'4"	215	Senior	Philadelphia, PA	Graduated

== Incoming recruits ==
College recruiting
Name	Hometown	School	Height	Weight	Commit date
Quinton Rose #31 SG	Rochester, NY	Greece Athena High School	6 ft 6 in (1.98 m)	170 lb (77 kg)	Aug 7, 2015
Quinton Rose #31 SG	Recruit ratings: Scout: Rivals: (80)				
Alani Moore #38 PG	Washington, DC	Friendship Collegiate Academy	5 ft 10 in (1.78 m)	155 lb (70 kg)	Sep 13, 2015
Alani Moore #38 PG	Recruit ratings: Scout: Rivals: (77)				
Damien Moore #49 C	Vaughn, MS	Callaway High School	6 ft 11 in (2.11 m)	210 lb (95 kg)	Nov 14, 2015
Damien Moore #49 C	Recruit ratings: Scout: Rivals: (77)				
Overall recruit ranking:
Note: In many cases, Scout, Rivals, 247Sports, On3, and ESPN may conflict in their listings of height and weight.; In these cases, the average was taken. ESPN grades are on a 100-point scale.; Sources: "2016 Team Ranking". Rivals.

== Roster ==
2016–17 Temple Owls men's basketball team
Players
Coaches

Pos.	#	Name	Height	Weight	Year	Previous school	Hometown
F	0	Obi Enechionyia	6 ft 8 in (2.03 m)	220 lb (100 kg)	Jr	St. James School	Springfield, Virginia
G	1	Josh Brown	6 ft 3 in (1.91 m)	185 lb (84 kg)	Sr	St. Anthony (NJ)	Irvington, New Jersey
G	2	Alani Moore	5 ft 10 in (1.78 m)	150 lb (68 kg)	Fr	Friendship Collegiate Academy	Washington, D.C.
G	3	Shizz Alston	6 ft 4 in (1.93 m)	170 lb (77 kg)	So	Haverford School	Philadelphia, Pennsylvania
G/F	4	Daniel Dingle	6 ft 7 in (2.01 m)	235 lb (107 kg)	RS Sr	St. Raymond	Bronx, New York
F	10	Mark Williams	6 ft 8 in (2.03 m)	240 lb (109 kg)	Sr	Montrose Christian	Cleveland, Ohio
G	11	Trey Lowe	6 ft 6 in (1.98 m)	165 lb (75 kg)	So	Ewing	Ewing Township, New Jersey
G	13	Quinton Rose	6 ft 6 in (1.98 m)	175 lb (79 kg)	Fr	Bishop Kearney	Rochester, New York
G	15	Isaiah Lewis	6 ft 6 in (1.98 m)	175 lb (79 kg)	Jr	Arlington Country Day	Brooklyn, New York
G	22	Mike Robbins (W)	6 ft 4 in (1.93 m)	185 lb (84 kg)	Sr	Lower Merion	Wynnewood, Pennsylvania
C	23	Damien Moore	6 ft 10 in (2.08 m)	235 lb (107 kg)	Fr	Callaway	Vaughn, Mississippi
C	24	Ernest Aflakpui	6 ft 10 in (2.08 m)	235 lb (107 kg)	So	Archbishop Carroll	Accra, Ghana
G/F	25	Steve Leonard	6 ft 6 in (1.98 m)	180 lb (82 kg)	RS Jr	Perkiomen Valley High School	Collegeville, Pennsylvania
G	32	Ayan Nunez de Carvalho	6 ft 5 in (1.96 m)	190 lb (86 kg)	RS Fr	Escuela Normal Superior	Paraná, Argentina

Head coach

- Fran Dunphy (La Salle)

Assistant coach(es)

- Aaron McKie (Temple)
- Shawn Trice (Penn)
- Chris Clark (Temple)

Legend

- (C) Team captain
- (S) Suspended
- (I) Ineligible
- (W) Walk-on
- Injured
- Current redshirt

Roster
Last update: December 26, 2016

== Schedule and results ==
Date time, TV	Rank^{#}	Opponent^{#}	Result	Record	Site (attendance) city, state
Non-conference regular season
November 11, 2016*; 7:00 pm, ESPNews		La Salle; Philadelphia Big 5	W 97–92 ^{OT}	1–0	Liacouras Center (7,768); Philadelphia, PA
November 14, 2016*; 8:00 pm, ESPN3		New Hampshire; NIT Season Tip-Off	L 52–57	1–1	Liacouras Center (4,893); Philadelphia, PA
November 17, 2016*; 7:00 pm, ASN		at Massachusetts	L 67–70	1–2	Mullins Center (3,732); Amherst, MA
November 20, 2016*; 2:00 pm, ESPN3		Manhattan; NIT Season Tip-Off	W 88–67	2–2	Liacouras Center (5,156); Philadelphia, PA
November 24, 2016*; 12:30 pm, ESPNU		vs. No. 25 Florida State; NIT Season Tip-Off semifinals	W 89–86	3–2	Barclays Center (2,451); Brooklyn, NY
November 25, 2016*; 3:00 pm, ESPN2		vs. No. 19 West Virginia; NIT Season Tip-Off finals	W 81–77	4–2	Barclays Center (3,713); Brooklyn, NY
November 30, 2016*; 7:00 pm, CBSSN		at Saint Joseph's; Rivalry/Philadelphia Big 5	W 78–72	5–2	Hagan Arena (4,200); Philadelphia, PA
December 3, 2016*; 4:00 pm, ASN		Penn; Philadelphia Big 5	W 70–62	6–2	Liacouras Center (6,193); Philadelphia, PA
December 7, 2016*; 7:30 pm, CBSSN		George Washington	L 63–66	6–3	Liacouras Center (5,016); Philadelphia, PA
December 10, 2016*; 11:30 am, ESPNU		vs. DePaul; Hoophall Miami Invitational	W 74–65	7–3	American Airlines Arena; Miami, FL
December 13, 2016*; 7:00 pm, FS1		at No. 1 Villanova; Philadelphia Big 5	L 57–78	7–4	The Pavilion (6,500); Villanova, PA
December 17, 2016*; 2:00 pm		NJIT	W 68–63	8–4	Liacouras Center (4,934); Philadelphia, PA
December 22, 2016*; 7:00 pm, ESPNU		Yale	W 83–77	9–4	Liacouras Center (4,775); Philadelphia, PA
AAC regular season
December 28, 2016; 9:00 pm, ESPNU		No. 23 Cincinnati	L 50–56	9–5 (0–1)	Liacouras Center (5,478); Philadelphia, PA
December 31, 2016; 4:00 pm, ESPNU		at UCF	L 53–77	9–6 (0–2)	CFE Arena (3,906); Orlando, FL
January 4, 2017; 9:00 pm, CBSSN		at SMU	L 65–79	9–7 (0–3)	Moody Coliseum (6,782); Dallas, TX
January 7, 2017; 12:00 pm, ASN		East Carolina	W 81–62	10–7 (1–3)	Liacouras Center (5,613); Philadelphia, PA
January 11, 2017; 9:00 pm, CBSSN		at UConn	L 59–73	10–8 (1–4)	Gampel Pavilion (6,582); Storrs, CT
January 14, 2017; 12:00 pm, ESPNews		Tulsa	L 68–70	10–9 (1–5)	Liacouras Center (6,175); Philadelphia, PA
January 18, 2017; 7:00 pm, CBSSN		at No. 20 Cincinnati	L 74–81	10–10 (1–6)	Fifth Third Arena (10,718); Cincinnati, OH
January 25, 2017; 6:00 pm, CBSSN		Memphis	W 77–66	11–10 (2–6)	Liacouras Center (4,950); Philadelphia, PA
January 28, 2017; 10:00 pm, ESPNU		at Houston	L 66–79	11–11 (2–7)	Hofheinz Pavilion (3,627); Houston, TX
January 31, 2017; 8:00 pm, ESPNews		at Tulane	W 79–71	12–11 (3–7)	Devlin Fieldhouse (1,609); New Orleans, LA
February 5, 2017; 1:00 pm, ASN		South Florida	W 83–74	13–11 (4–7)	Liacouras Center (5,824); Philadelphia, PA
February 9, 2017; 9:00 pm, ESPN2		No. 25 SMU	L 50–66	13–12 (4–8)	Liacouras Center (4,603); Philadelphia, PA
February 12, 2017; 2:00 pm, CBSSN		at Memphis	W 74–62	14–12 (5–8)	FedEx Forum (10,552); Memphis, TN
February 15, 2017; 7:00 pm, ESPNews		at East Carolina	L 64–78	14–13 (5–9)	Williams Arena (3,741); Greenville, NC
February 19, 2017; 4:00 pm, ESPN		UConn	L 63–64	14–14 (5–10)	Liacouras Center (8,702); Philadelphia, PA
February 22, 2017; 7:00 pm, ESPNU		UCF	L 69–71	14–15 (5–11)	Liacouras Center (5,073); Philadelphia, PA
February 25, 2017; 12:00 pm, ESPNU		Tulane	W 86-76 ^{2OT}	15–15 (6–11)	Liacouras Center (7,727); Philadelphia, PA
March 5, 2017; 2:00 pm, ESPNU		at South Florida	W 72–60	16–15 (7–11)	USF Sun Dome (2,509); Tampa, FL
AAC Tournament
March 9, 2017; 3:30 pm, ESPNU	(8)	vs. (9) East Carolina; First round	L 69–80	16–16	XL Center (4,874); Hartford, CT
*Non-conference game. ^{#}Rankings from AP Poll. (#) Tournament seedings in parentheses. All times are in Eastern Time.
