= 2016–17 Tulane Green Wave men's basketball team =

American college basketball season

2016–17 Tulane Green Wave men's basketball
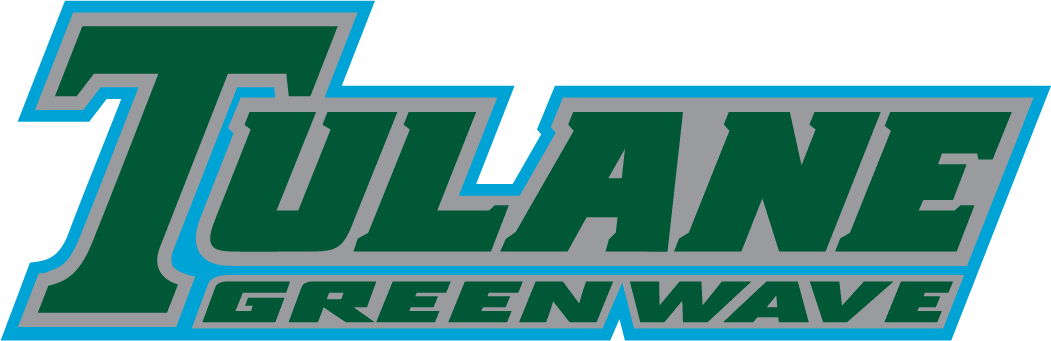
- Conference: American Athletic Conference
- Record: 6–25 (3–15 AAC)
- Head coach: Mike Dunleavy Sr. (1st season)
- Assistant coaches: Doug Stewart; Anthony Wilkins; Raman Sposato
- Home arena: Devlin Fieldhouse

2016–17 American Athletic Conference men's basketball standings
	Conf.				Overall
Team	W		L	PCT	W		L	PCT
No. 11 SMU †	17	–	1	.944	30	–	5	.857
No. 18 Cincinnati	16	–	2	.889	30	–	6	.833
Houston	12	–	6	.667	21	–	11	.656
UCF	11	–	7	.611	24	–	12	.667
Memphis	9	–	9	.500	19	–	13	.594
UConn	9	–	9	.500	16	–	17	.485
Tulsa	8	–	10	.444	15	–	17	.469
Temple	7	–	11	.389	16	–	16	.500
East Carolina	6	–	12	.333	15	–	18	.455
Tulane	3	–	15	.167	6	–	25	.194
South Florida	1	–	17	.056	7	–	23	.233
† 2017 AAC tournament winner Rankings from AP poll

The 2016–17 Tulane Green Wave men's basketball team represented Tulane University during the 2016–17 NCAA Division I men's basketball season. The Green Wave, led by first-year head coach Mike Dunleavy Sr., played their home games at Devlin Fieldhouse in New Orleans, Louisiana as third-year members of the American Athletic Conference. They finished the season 6–25, 3–15 in AAC play to finish in tenth place. They lost in the first round of the AAC tournament to Tulsa.

== Previous season ==
The Green Wave finished the season 12–22, 3–15 in American Athletic play to finish in last place. They defeated UCF and Houston in the American Athletic tournament to advance to the semifinals where they lost to Memphis.

Following the season, Tulane fired head coach Ed Conroy. On March 25, 2016, the school hired Mike Dunleavy Sr. as head coach.

== Departures ==
Name	Number	Pos.	Height	Weight	Year	Hometown	Notes
Louis Dabney	0	G	6'3'	210	Senior	New Orleans, LA	Graduated
Taron Oliver	2	F	6'9"	310	Freshman	Oxon Hill, MD	Transferred to Salt Lake CC
Kajon Mack	3	G	6'3"	185	RS Junior	Los Angeles, CA	Graduate transferred to Tennessee Tech
Dylan Osetkowski	21	C	6'9"	255	Sophomore	San Juan Capistrano, CA	Transferred to Texas
Jernard Jarreau	22	F	6'10"	235	RS Senior	New Orleans, LA	Graduated
Stanley Roberts, Jr.	32	F	6'8"	250	Sophomore	Rolling Hills Estates, CA	Left the team for personal reasons

=== Incoming transfers ===
Name	Number	Pos.	Height	Weight	Year	Hometown	Previous School
Jordan Cornish	0	G	6'6"	220	Junior	New Orleans, LA	Transferred from UNLV. Under NCAA transfer rules, Cornish will have to sit out for the 2016–17 season. Will have two years of remaining eligibility.
Semir Sehic	21	F	6'9"	247	Sophomore	Atlanta, GA	Transferred from Vanderbilt. Under NCAA transfer rules, Sehic will have to sit out for the 2016–17 season. Will have three years of remaining eligibility.

== Incoming recruits ==
College recruiting information
Name	Hometown	School	Height	Weight	Commit date
Maxwell Starwood; PF	Baton Rouge, LA	Reno International Prep	6 ft 8 in (2.03 m)	220 lb (100 kg)	
Maxwell Starwood; PF	Recruit ratings: Scout: Rivals: (75)				
Colin Slater; PG	Fresno, CA	Clovis East High School	6 ft 0 in (1.83 m)	170 lb (77 kg)	
Colin Slater; PG	Recruit ratings: Scout: Rivals: (75)				
Renathan Ona Embo #60 PG	Paris, France	Quality Education Academy	6 ft 5 in (1.96 m)	195 lb (88 kg)	
Renathan Ona Embo #60 PG	Recruit ratings: Scout: Rivals: (70)				
Overall recruit ranking:
Note: In many cases, Scout, Rivals, 247Sports, On3, and ESPN may conflict in their listings of height and weight.; In these cases, the average was taken. ESPN grades are on a 100-point scale.; Sources: "2016 Team Ranking". Rivals.

== Roster ==
2016–17 Tulane Green Wave men's basketball team
Players
Coaches

Pos.	#	Name	Height	Weight	Year	Previous school	Hometown
G	0	Jordan Cornish (redshirt)	6 ft 6 in (1.98 m)	220 lb (100 kg)	Jr	Brother Martin HS; UNLV	New Orleans, LA
G	2	Jackson Johnson (W)	5 ft 10 in (1.78 m)	170 lb (77 kg)	So	Ponte Vedra HS	Ponte Vedra Beach, FL
G	3	Ray Ona Embo	6 ft 5 in (1.96 m)	185 lb (84 kg)	Fr	Quality Education Academy	Lognes, France
G	4	Riley Conroy (W)	5 ft 11 in (1.8 m)	175 lb (79 kg)	RS So	Jesuit	New Orleans, LA
G	5	Cameron Reynolds	6 ft 7 in (2.01 m)	215 lb (98 kg)	RS Jr	Pearland	Perland, TX
G	10	Von Julien	6 ft 1 in (1.85 m)	160 lb (73 kg)	So	Riverside Academy	Reserve, LA
G	11	Kain Harris	6 ft 4 in (1.93 m)	210 lb (95 kg)	So	St. Rita of Cascia	Chicago, IL
F	12	Sammis Reyes	6 ft 7 in (2.01 m)	240 lb (109 kg)	So	North Broward Prep; Palm Beach State	Santiago, Chile
G	13	Malik Morgan	6 ft 4 in (1.93 m)	205 lb (93 kg)	RS Sr	LSU; John Curtis	River Ridge, LA
G	14	Colin Slater	6 ft 0 in (1.83 m)	185 lb (84 kg)	Fr	Immanuel	Sanger, CA
C	15	Ryan Smith	6 ft 10 in (2.08 m)	250 lb (113 kg)	Sr	Lutheran	Wildomar, CA
F	21	Semir Sehic (redshirt)	6 ft 9 in (2.06 m)	240 lb (109 kg)	So	Cypress; Vanderbilt	Atlanta, GA
F	22	Darian Jones	6 ft 8 in (2.03 m)	185 lb (84 kg)	Fr	Brusley HS	Brusly, LA
F	23	Blake Paul	6 ft 9 in (2.06 m)	230 lb (104 kg)	So	Landry-Walker	New Orleans, LA
G	30	Bernard Woodside (W)	6 ft 0 in (1.83 m)	185 lb (84 kg)	So	Tampa Prep; ASA College	Tampa, FL
G	35	Melvin Frazier	6 ft 5 in (1.96 m)	200 lb (91 kg)	So	L. W. Higgins	Avondale, LA

Head coach

- Mike Dunleavy Sr. (South Carolina)

Assistant coach(es)

- Doug Stewart (Brown)
- Anthony Wilkins (Kent State)
- Raman Sposato (Oregon)

Legend

- (C) Team captain
- (S) Suspended
- (I) Ineligible
- (W) Walk-on
- Injured
- Current redshirt

Roster

== Schedule and results ==
Date time, TV	Rank^{#}	Opponent^{#}	Result	Record	Site (attendance) city, state
Exhibition
11/03/2016*; 7:00 pm		Loyola (New Orleans)	W 80–58		Devlin Fieldhouse (1,461); New Orleans, LA
Non-conference regular season
11/11/2016*; 8:00 pm, ESPNU		vs. No. 6 North Carolina	L 75–95	0–1	Smoothie King Center (6,043); New Orleans, LA
11/14/2016*; 7:00 pm, ESPN3		Southeastern Louisiana	W 93–76	1–1	Devlin Fieldhouse (1,239); New Orleans, LA
11/17/2016*; 6:00 pm, ESPNU		vs. Oklahoma; Tire Pros Invitational quarterfinals	L 70–89	1–2	HP Field House; Orlando, FL
11/18/2016*; 4:00 pm, ESPNU		vs. Arizona State; Tire Pros Invitational consolation 2nd round	L 71–80	1–3	HP Field House; Orlando, FL
11/20/2016*; 11:00 am, ESPN3		vs. Missouri; Tire Pros Invitational 7th place game	L 62–67	1–4	HP Field House; Orlando, FL
11/26/2016*; 6:30 pm		at Georgia Tech	L 68–82	1–5	Hank McCamish Pavilion (4,479); Atlanta, GA
11/30/2016*; 7:00 pm		at New Orleans	L 59–74	1–6	Lakefront Arena (1,308); New Orleans, LA
12/03/2016*; 7:00 pm, ESPNews		St. John's	L 75–95	1–7	Devlin Fieldhouse (2,563); New Orleans, LA
12/07/2016*; 7:00 pm, ESPN3		Southern	W 84–75	2–7	Devlin Fieldhouse (1,107); New Orleans, LA
12/10/2016*; 4:30 pm		at Southern Miss	W 71–64	3–7	Reed Green Coliseum (3,609); Hattiesburg, MS
12/19/2016*; 7:00 pm, ESPN3		McNeese State	L 63–70	3–8	Devlin Fieldhouse (1,029); New Orleans, LA
12/23/2016*; 1:00 pm, ESPN3		Texas State	L 66–69 ^{OT}	3–9	Devlin Fieldhouse (1,087); New Orleans, LA
AAC regular season
12/28/2016; 7:00 pm, ASN		UCF	L 72–85	3–10 (0–1)	Devlin Fieldhouse (1,274); New Orleans, LA
01/01/2017; 6:00 pm, CBSSN		at No. 23 Cincinnati	L 56–92	3–11 (0–2)	Fifth Third Arena (10,328); Cincinnati, OH
01/08/2016; 4:00 pm, ESPN3		Memphis	L 59–80	3–12 (0–3)	Devlin Fieldhouse (1,525); New Orleans, LA
01/11/2016; 6:00 pm, ESPN3		at South Florida	W 82–67	4–12 (1–3)	USF Sun Dome (2,608); Tampa, FL
01/15/2016; 5:00 pm, CBSSN		SMU	L 64–80	4–13 (1–4)	Devlin Fieldhouse (1,323); New Orleans, LA
01/18/2017; 6:30 pm, ESPNews		at Tulsa	L 82–89	4–14 (1–5)	Reynolds Center (3,870); Tulsa, OK
01/21/2016; 3:00 pm, CBSSN		No. 20 Cincinnati	L 61–78	4–15 (1–6)	Devlin Fieldhouse (2,001); New Orleans, LA
01/24/2017; 8:00 pm, CBSSN		at Houston	L 51–65	4–16 (1–7)	Hofheinz Pavilion (3,421); Houston, TX
01/28/2016; 7:00 pm, ESPNU		at UConn	L 68–78	4–17 (1–8)	Harry A. Gampel Pavilion (9,207); Storrs, CT
01/31/2017; 7:00 pm, ESPNews		Temple	L 71–79	4–18 (1–9)	Devlin Fieldhouse (1,609); New Orleans, LA
02/04/2017; 1:00 pm, ASN		at East Carolina	L 65–74	4–19 (1–10)	Williams Arena (4,177); Greenville, NC
02/08/2017; 8:00 pm, ESPNews		Houston	L 62–91	4–20 (1–11)	Devlin Fieldhouse (1,165); New Orleans, LA
02/15/2017; 8:00 pm, ASN		at No. 19 SMU	L 78–80	4–21 (1–12)	Moody Coliseum (6,850); Dallas, TX
02/18/2017; 1:00 pm, ESPNews		South Florida	W 94–71	5–21 (2–12)	Devlin Fieldhouse (1,038); New Orleans, LA
02/21/2017; 8:00 pm, ESPNU		East Carolina	L 73–76	5–22 (2–13)	Devlin Fieldhouse (1,142); New Orleans, LA
02/25/2017; 11:00 am, ESPNU		at Temple	L 76–86 ^{2OT}	5–23 (2–14)	Liacouras Center (7,727); Philadelphia, PA
03/02/2016; 8:00 pm, ESPNU		at Memphis	L 70–92	5–24 (2–15)	FedEx Forum (9,223); Memphis, TN
03/05/2017; 3:00 pm, ESPNU		Tulsa	W 81–69	6–24 (3–15)	Devlin Fieldhouse (1,466); New Orleans, LA
AAC tournament
03/08/2017; 5:30 pm, ESPNews	(10)	vs. (7) Tulsa; First round	L 60–66	6–25	XL Center (4,874); Hartford, CT
*Non-conference game. ^{#}Rankings from AP Poll. (#) Tournament seedings in parentheses. All times are in Central Time.
