= 2016–17 South Florida Bulls men's basketball team =

American college basketball season

2016–17 South Florida Bulls men's basketball
- Conference: American Athletic Conference
- Record: 7–23 (1–17 AAC)
- Head coach: Orlando Antigua; Murry Bartow (interim)
- Assistant coaches: Sergio Rouco; Rod Strickland
- Home arena: USF Sun Dome

2016–17 American Athletic Conference men's basketball standings
	Conf.				Overall
Team	W		L	PCT	W		L	PCT
No. 11 SMU †	17	–	1	.944	30	–	5	.857
No. 18 Cincinnati	16	–	2	.889	30	–	6	.833
Houston	12	–	6	.667	21	–	11	.656
UCF	11	–	7	.611	24	–	12	.667
Memphis	9	–	9	.500	19	–	13	.594
UConn	9	–	9	.500	16	–	17	.485
Tulsa	8	–	10	.444	15	–	17	.469
Temple	7	–	11	.389	16	–	16	.500
East Carolina	6	–	12	.333	15	–	18	.455
Tulane	3	–	15	.167	6	–	25	.194
South Florida	1	–	17	.056	7	–	23	.233
† 2017 AAC tournament winner Rankings from AP poll

The 2016–17 South Florida Bulls men's basketball team represented the University of South Florida during the 2016–17 NCAA Division I men's basketball season. The season marked the 46th basketball season for USF and the fourth as a member of the American Athletic Conference. They were led by interim head coach Murry Bartow. The Bulls played their home games at the USF Sun Dome on the university's Tampa, Florida campus. The Bulls finished the season 7–23, 1–17 in AAC play to finish in last place. As the No. 11 seed in the AAC tournament, they lost in the first round to UConn.

The Bulls were led by head coach Orlando Antigua for the first 13 games of the season until he was fired amid academic fraud allegations. On March 14, 2017, the school hired Brian Gregory as the next head coach.

== Previous season ==
The Bulls finished the 2015–16 season 8–25, 4–14 in AAC play to finish in a tie for ninth place in conference. They beat East Carolina in the first round of the AAC tournament before losing to Temple in the quarterfinals.

On July 20, 2016, Oliver Antigua, assistant coach and brother to head coach Orlando Antigua, resigned due to NCAA academic fraud allegations.

== Offseason ==
=== Departures ===
Name	Number	Pos.	Height	Weight	Year	Hometown	Notes
Chris Perry	1	F/C	6'8"	242	Junior	Bartow, FL	Dismissed from the team due violation of team rules
Roddy Peters	3	G	6'3"	192	RS Sophomore	District Heights, MD	Dismissed from the team; transferred to Lincoln Memorial
Nehemias Morillo	5	G	6'5"	180	Senior	Santiago, Dominican Republic	Graduated
Jaleel Cousins	15	C	6'10"	265	Senior	Mobile, AL	Graduated
Angel Nunez	22	F	6'8"	202	Senior	Washington Heights, NY	Graduated

=== Incoming transfers ===
Name	Number	Pos.	Height	Weight	Year	Hometown	Previous School
Isaiah Manderson	1	C	6'10"	255	Junior	Bronx, NY	Transferred from Texas Tech. Under NCAA transfer rules, Manderson will have to sit out for the 2016–17 season. Will have two years of remaining eligibility.
Malik Martin	5	F	6'11"	220	Junior	Miami, FL	Transferred from USC. Under NCAA transfer rules, Martin will have to sit out for the 2016–17 season. Will have two years of remaining eligibility.

=== Incoming recruits ===
College recruiting information
Name	Hometown	School	Height	Weight	Commit date
Troy Baxter Jr. #17 SF	Gainesville, FL	Oldsmar Christian High School	6 ft 8 in (2.03 m)	195 lb (88 kg)	May 1, 2015
Troy Baxter Jr. #17 SF	Recruit ratings: Scout: Rivals: (82)				
Malik Fitts; SF	La Verne, CA	Brewster Academy	6 ft 8 in (2.03 m)	230 lb (100 kg)	Sep 29, 2015
Malik Fitts; SF	Recruit ratings: Scout: Rivals: (76)				
Mike Bibby Jr. #56 PG	Phoenix, AZ	Shadow Mountain High School	6 ft 3 in (1.91 m)	175 lb (79 kg)	Aug 6, 2016
Mike Bibby Jr. #56 PG	Recruit ratings: Scout: Rivals: (70)				
Andres Feliz; SG	Orlando, FL	West Oaks Academy	6 ft 2 in (1.88 m)	180 lb (82 kg)	May 2, 2015
Andres Feliz; SG	Recruit ratings: Scout: Rivals: (0)				
Overall recruit ranking:
Note: In many cases, Scout, Rivals, 247Sports, On3, and ESPN may conflict in their listings of height and weight.; In these cases, the average was taken. ESPN grades are on a 100-point scale.; Sources: "2016 Team Ranking". Rivals.

== Roster ==
2016–17 South Florida Bulls men's basketball team
Players
Coaches

Pos.	#	Name	Height	Weight	Year	Previous school	Hometown
G	0	Jahmal McMurray	6 ft 0 in (1.83 m)	165 lb (75 kg)	So	Sunrise Christian Academy	Topeka, Kansas
F	1	Isaiah Manderson (I) (redshirt)	6 ft 10 in (2.08 m)	247 lb (112 kg)	Jr	Texas Tech	Bronx, New York
F	5	Malik Martin	6 ft 11 in (2.11 m)	214 lb (97 kg)	Jr	USC	Miami, Florida
G	10	Michael Bibby	6 ft 3 in (1.91 m)	175 lb (79 kg)	Fr	Shadow Mountain High School	Phoenix, Arizona
G	11	Jake Bodway	6 ft 3 in (1.91 m)	201 lb (91 kg)	Jr	Bloomington Jefferson High School	Bloomington, Minnesota
G	13	Geno Thorpe	6 ft 4 in (1.93 m)	170 lb (77 kg)	RS Jr	Penn State	Pittsburgh, Pennsylvania
G	14	Henry Beard	6 ft 0 in (1.83 m)	177 lb (80 kg)	Fr	Seminole High School	Seminole, Florida
F	15	Yito Alvarado	6 ft 7 in (2.01 m)	206 lb (93 kg)	RS Fr	University School of NSU	San Juan, Puerto Rico
F	21	Tulio Da Silva	6 ft 7 in (2.01 m)	206 lb (93 kg)	RS Fr	Arlington Country Day School	Formiga, Brazil
F	24	Malik Fitts	6 ft 8 in (2.03 m)	237 lb (108 kg)	Fr	Brewster Academy	Rancho Cucamonga, California
G	25	Troy Holston	6 ft 4 in (1.93 m)	200 lb (91 kg)	So	Oldsmar Christian School	Queens, New York
C	33	Ruben Guerrero	7 ft 0 in (2.13 m)	235 lb (107 kg)	Jr	Sunrise Christian Academy	Marbella, Spain
F	35	Bo Zeigler	6 ft 6 in (1.98 m)	207 lb (94 kg)	Jr	Detroit Community School	Detroit, Michigan
F	42	Luis Santos	6 ft 9 in (2.06 m)	266 lb (121 kg)	So	Sunrise Christian High School	Bronx, New York

Head coach

- Murry Bartow (UAB)

Assistant coach(es)

- Sergio Rouco (Nova Southeastern)
- Rod Strickland (DePaul)

Legend

- (C) Team captain
- (S) Suspended
- (I) Ineligible
- (W) Walk-on
- Injured
- Current redshirt

Roster

== Schedule and results ==
Date time, TV	Rank^{#}	Opponent^{#}	Result	Record	Site (attendance) city, state
Exhibition
11/07/2016*; 7:00 pm		Nova Southeastern	W 72–64		USF Sun Dome; Tampa, FL
Non-conference regular season
11/11/2016*; 7:00 pm, ESPN3		Florida A&M	W 84–73	1–0	USF Sun Dome (3,106); Tampa, FL
11/17/2016*; 7:00 pm, ESPN3		Elon	L 61–74	1–1	USF Sun Dome (2,206); Tampa, FL
11/19/2016*; 7:00 pm, ESPN3		Rider	W 70–65	2–1	USF Sun Dome (2,639); Tampa, FL
11/22/2016*; 7:00 pm		at Florida Atlantic	L 62–78	2–2	FAU Arena (1,474); Boca Raton, FL
11/28/2016*; 7:00 pm, ESPN3		Kennesaw State	W 71–69	3–2	USF Sun Dome (2,196); Tampa, FL
12/01/2016*; 7:00 pm, ESPN3		at Troy	W 80–74	4–2	Trojan Arena (876); Troy, AL
12/03/2016*; 4:00 pm		at George Washington	L 67–68	4–3	Charles E. Smith Center (2,288); Washington, D.C.
12/12/2016*; 7:00 pm, ESPN3		Bethune-Cookman	W 79–73 ^{OT}	5–3	USF Sun Dome (2,207); Tampa, FL
12/17/2016*; 1:00 pm, CBSSN		No. 16 South Carolina	L 66–77	5–4	USF Sun Dome (2,489); Tampa, FL
12/20/2016*; 7:00 pm, ESPN3		Northern Illinois	L 48–59	5–5	USF Sun Dome (2,129); Tampa, FL
12/22/2016*; 7:00 pm, ESPN3		Delaware	W 81–53	6–5	USF Sun Dome (2,398); Tampa, FL
AAC regular season
12/28/2016; 7:00 pm, ESPNews		at East Carolina	L 49–60	6–6 (0–1)	Williams Arena (4,163); Greenville, NC
12/31/2016; 12:00 pm, ESPNU		Houston	L 56–70	6–7 (0–2)	USF Sun Dome (2,353); Tampa, FL
01/07/2017; 5:00 pm, ESPNews		at SMU	L 65–84	6–8 (0–3)	Moody Coliseum (6,769); Dallas, TX
01/11/2017; 7:00 pm, ESPN3		Tulane	L 67–82	6–9 (0–4)	USF Sun Dome (2,608); Tampa, FL
01/14/2017; 7:00 pm, CBSSN		at Memphis	L 56–62	6–10 (0–5)	FedEx Forum (11,955); Memphis, TN
01/17/2017; 7:00 pm, ESPNews		at UCF	L 64–86	6–11 (0–6)	CFE Arena (5,765); Orlando, FL
01/21/2017; 1:00 pm, ESPNews		Tulsa	L 67–79	6–12 (0–7)	USF Sun Dome (2,614); Tampa, FL
01/25/2017; 7:00 pm, ESPNU		UConn	L 61–80	6–13 (0–8)	USF Sun Dome (3,238); Tampa, FL
01/29/2017; 4:00 pm, CBSSN		at No. 19 Cincinnati	L 53–94	6–14 (0–9)	Fifth Third Arena (12,576); Cincinnati, OH
02/02/2017; 7:00 pm, ESPNews		Memphis	L 75–85	6–15 (0–10)	USF Sun Dome (2,563); Tampa, FL
02/05/2017; 1:00 pm, ASN		at Temple	L 74–83	6–16 (0–11)	Liacouras Center (5,824); Philadelphia, PA
02/08/2017; 7:00 pm, CBSSN		at UConn	L 51–97	6–17 (0–12)	Gampel Pavilion (6,114); Storrs, CT
02/11/2017; 8:00 pm, ESPNU		East Carolina	W 64–57	7–17 (1–12)	USF Sun Dome (2,901); Tampa, FL
02/15/2017; 7:00 pm, ESPNU		No. 18 Cincinnati	L 54–68	7–18 (1–13)	USF Sun Dome (2,679); Tampa, FL
02/18/2017; 2:00 pm, ESPNews		at Tulane	L 71–94	7–19 (1–14)	Devlin Fieldhouse (1,038); New Orleans, LA
02/23/2017; 8:00 pm, ESPNews		at Tulsa	L 68–82	7–20 (1–15)	Reynolds Center (3,849); Tulsa, OK
03/02/2017; 7:00 pm, ESPNU		UCF	L 56–59	7–21 (1–16)	USF Sun Dome (3,120); Tampa, FL
03/05/2017; 2:00 pm, ESPNU		Temple	L 60–72	7–22 (1–17)	USF Sun Dome (2,509); Tampa, FL
AAC tournament
03/08/2017; 9:00 pm, ESPNNews	(11)	at (6) UConn; First round	L 66–77	7–23	XL Center (4,874); Hartford, CT
*Non-conference game. ^{#}Rankings from AP Poll. (#) Tournament seedings in parentheses. All times are in Eastern Time.
