= NIT Season Tip-Off =

Preseason college basketball tournament

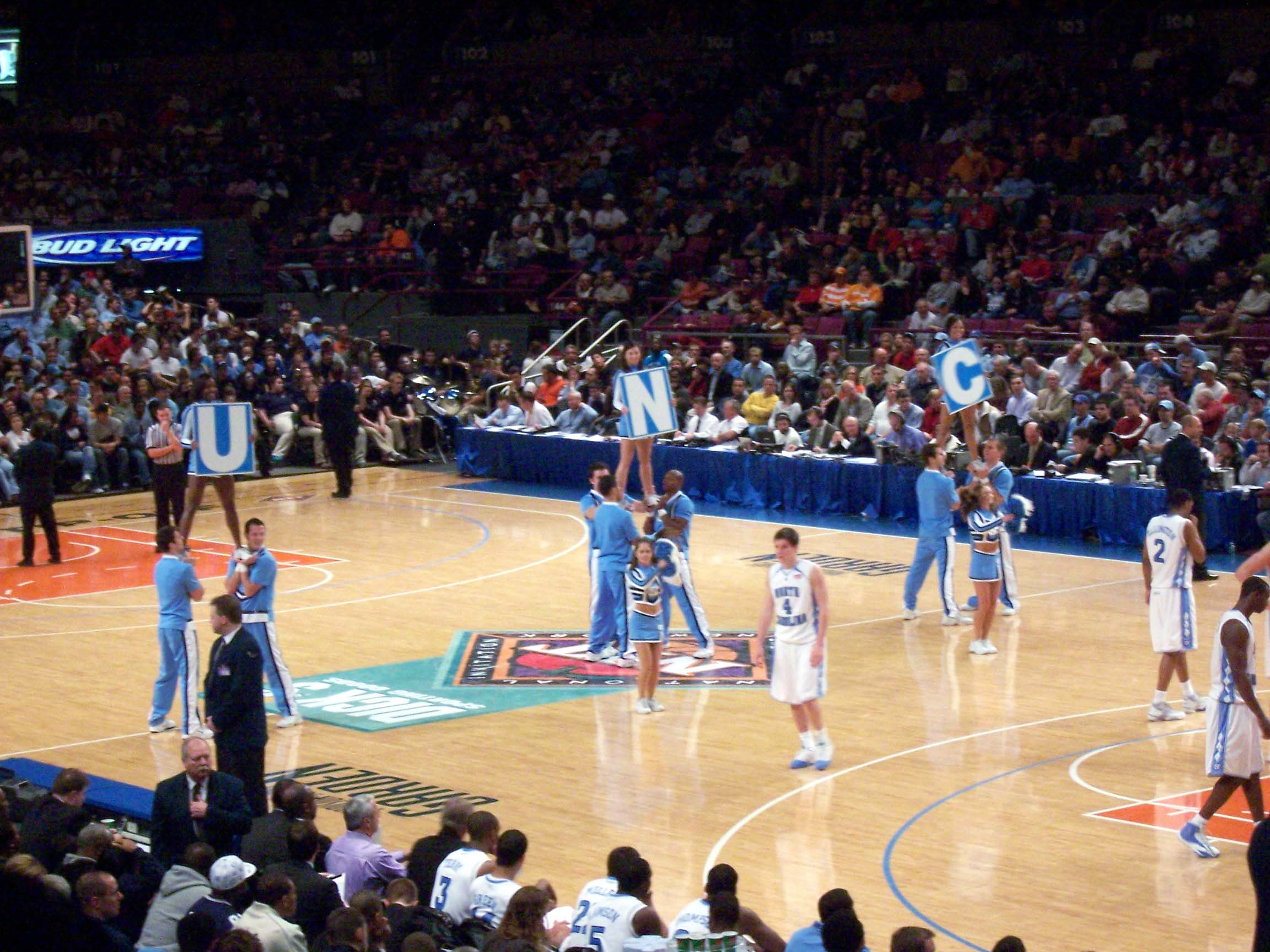
North Carolina vs. Tennessee, Third Place Game, November 24, 2006

The NIT Season Tip-Off (National Invitation Tournament) is an annual college basketball tournament that takes place in November of each year, toward the beginning of the season. The first two rounds are held at campus sites, while the semifinals and the finals are held during the week of Thanksgiving in Brooklyn. The 2020 tournament was to be held at Amway Center in Orlando, Florida, but the COVID-19 pandemic caused the NCAA to cancel it. The tournament, which is a part of the regular season for all participating colleges, began in 1985 as the Preseason NIT, so-called in order to distinguish it from the postseason National Invitation Tournament (NIT). In 2005, the NCAA purchased the preseason and postseason NIT, and renamed the November tournament the NIT Season Tip-Off. The tournament remains one of the most well-known preseason tournaments in NCAA Division I men's basketball, along with the Maui Invitational.

== Tournament format ==
The tournament had a new format in 2006. The first two rounds were held at regional "common sites" instead of campus sites, making the format more like the postseason NCAA Tournament. Through 2014, the semifinals and finals had always been held at Madison Square Garden. In 2006, the common sites were Charlotte, North Carolina, Nashville, Tennessee, Indianapolis and Spokane, Washington. The tournament returned to its previous format in 2007 then returned to the 2006 format in 2009.

On September 3, 2014 a new format was announced for the NIT Season Tip-Off. The NIT Season Tip-Off will no longer be a bracketed event, instead becoming a classic with set semifinal matchups in New York, after the NCAA could only get eight teams in the field instead of 16. The NCAA-run event will add a new wrinkle due to the reduced field and feature a showcase of games on Thanksgiving Day with the other four teams that are not in the championship. Teams in the NIT Season Tip-Off will play four games at campus sites prior to the eight teams' arrival in New York.

The NIT Season Tip-Off tournament was not held in 2022 but did return for 2023 and subsequent years.

== Tournament history ==
=== Venues ===
Madison Square Garden hosted the semifinal and final rounds for the first three decades, since the tournament's inception. Beginning in 2015, Barclays Center in Brooklyn will hold the two semifinal games on Thanksgiving Day, as well as the championship game the following day. Barclays Center will also have the 2016 and 2018 semis and finals. In 2017, the tournament is scheduled to move over to the nearby Nassau Veterans Memorial Coliseum, which is in the process of getting a major renovation to its facilities.

=== Championship games ===
- 1985 – Duke 92, Kansas 86
- 1986 – UNLV 96, Western Kentucky 95 (2 OT)
- 1987 – Florida 70, Seton Hall 68
- 1988 – Syracuse 86, Missouri 84 (OT)
- 1989 – Kansas 66, St. John's 57
- 1990 – Arizona 89, Arkansas 77
- 1991 – Oklahoma State 78, Georgia Tech 71
- 1992 – Indiana 78, Seton Hall 74
- 1993 – Kansas 86, Massachusetts 75
- 1994 – Ohio 84, New Mexico State 80 (OT)
- 1995 – Arizona 81, Georgetown 71
- 1996 – Indiana 85, Duke 69
- 1997 – Kansas 73, Florida State 58
- 1998 – North Carolina 57, Stanford 49
- 1999 – Arizona 63, Kentucky 51
- 2000 – Duke 63, Temple 60
- 2001 – Syracuse 74, Wake Forest 67
- 2002 – North Carolina 67, Kansas 56
- 2003 – Georgia Tech 85, Texas Tech 65
- 2004 – Wake Forest 63, Arizona 60
- 2005 – Duke 70, Memphis 67
- 2006 – Butler 79, Gonzaga 71
- 2007 – Texas A&M 70, Ohio State 47
- 2008 – Oklahoma 87, Purdue 82 (OT)
- 2009 – Duke 68, Connecticut 59
- 2010 – Tennessee 78, Villanova 68
- 2011 – Syracuse 69, Stanford 63
- 2012 – Michigan 71, Kansas State 57
- 2013 – Arizona 72, Duke 66
- 2014 – Gonzaga 73, St. John's 66
- 2015 – Villanova 69, Georgia Tech 52
- 2016 – Temple 81, West Virginia 77
- 2017 – Virginia 70, Rhode Island 55
- 2018 – Kansas 87, Tennessee 81 (OT)
- 2019 – Oklahoma State 78, Ole Miss 37
- 2020 – NONE (COVID-19 pandemic).
- 2021 – Iowa State 78, Memphis 59
- 2022 – No tournament
- 2023 – Baylor 95, Florida 91
- 2024 - Utah State 61, North Texas 57

== Brackets ==
* – Denotes overtime period

=== 2024 ===
- November 28 – November 29

3rd place Game; November 29; ESPNU
St. Bonaventure	68
Northern Iowa	56

Semifinals; November 28; ESPN 2/ESPNU
Utah State	72
St. Bonaventure	67
Northern Iowa	48
North Texas	68

Championship; November 29; ESPN2
Utah State	61
North Texas	57

=== 2023 ===
Semifinals; November 22; ESPN2
13	Baylor	88
Oregon State	72
Florida	86
Pittsburgh	71

Championship; November 24; ESPN
13	Baylor	95
Florida	91
3rd Place Game; ESPN2
Oregon State	51
Pittsburgh	76

=== 2021 ===
Semifinals; November 24
25	Xavier	70
Iowa State	82
9	Memphis	69
Virginia Tech	61

Championship; November 26
Iowa State	78
9	Memphis	59
3rd Place Game
25	Xavier	59
Virginia Tech	58

=== 2020 ===
The field originally included Cincinnati, Arizona, Texas Tech and St. John's.

An initial attempt was made to move the event to the bubble at the ESPN Wide World of Sports Complex in Walt Disney World, but the tournament was eventually cancelled outright due to COVID-19.

=== 2019 ===
Semifinals; November 27; ESPN2
Ole Miss	74
Penn State	72
Syracuse	72
Oklahoma State	86

Championship; November 29; ESPN2
Ole Miss	37
Oklahoma State	78
3rd Place Game; ESPN2
Penn State	85
Syracuse	64

=== 2018 ===
Semifinals; November 21; ESPN2
Louisville	81
5	Tennessee	92
Marquette	68
2	Kansas	77

Championship; November 23; ESPN2
5	Tennessee	81
2	Kansas	87*
3rd Place Game; ESPN2
Louisville	74
Marquette	77*

=== 2017 ===
==== Campus site games ====
Game 1 November 10; Fox Sports 2		Game 4 November 12; Fox Sports 1
		Monmouth	65
Fairleigh Dickinson	68	Seton Hall	75
Seton Hall	90

Game 2 November 10		Game 7 November 17
		UNC Asheville	76
Austin Peay	54	Vanderbilt	79
Vanderbilt	73

Game 3 November 11		Game 10; November 22
		Monmouth	51
UNC Asheville	60	UNC Asheville	62
Rhode Island	84

Game 5 November 13; ACC Network Extra		Game 9 November 19; Regional Sports Network
		Monmouth	53
Austin Peay	49	Virginia	73
Virginia	93

Game 6 November 15		Game 8 November 19
		UNC Asheville	82
Oakland City	50	Austin Peay	79
Austin Peay	109

==== Championship round ====
Semifinals; November 23; ESPNU
Virginia	68
Vanderbilt	42
Rhode Island	75
20	Seton Hall	74

Championship; November 24; ESPNU
Virginia	70
Rhode Island	55
3rd Place Game; ESPNews
Vanderbilt	59
20	Seton Hall	72

=== 2016 ===
Semifinals; November 24; ESPNU
Temple	89
25	Florida State	86
Illinois	57
19	West Virginia	89

Championship; November 25; ESPN2
Temple	81
19	West Virginia	77
3rd Place Game; ESPNU
25	Florida State	72
Illinois	61

=== 2015 ===
Semifinals; November 26; ESPNU/ESPN2
Arkansas	73
Georgia Tech	83
Stanford	45
8	Villanova	59

Championship; November 27; ESPN2
Georgia Tech	52
8	Villanova	69
3rd Place Game; ESPNU
Arkansas	66
Stanford	69

=== 2014 ===
Semifinals; November 26
Minnesota	61
St. John's	70
Georgia	76
10	Gonzaga	88

Championship; November 28; ESPN2
St. John's	66
10	Gonzaga	73
3rd Place Game; ESPNU
Minnesota	66
Georgia	62

==== Thanksgiving Day games ====
Showcase format – no tournament
November 22
LIU Brooklyn	54
Stony Brook	73
November 27
WKU	62
Saint Joseph's	59

=== 2013 ===
First Round; November 18
1	Arizona	100
Fairleigh Dickinson	50
5	Rhode Island	66
Metro State	63
4	Rutgers	66
Canisius	51
6	Elon	64
8	Drexel	71
3	Alabama	102
Stillman College	65
Georgia State	96
McNeese State	70
2	Duke	91
UNC Asheville	55
7	East Carolina	76
Norfolk State	74

Quarterfinals; November 19
1	Arizona	87
5	Rhode Island	59
4	Rutgers	59
8	Drexel	70
3	Alabama	75
Georgia State	58
2	Duke	83
7	East Carolina	74

Semifinals; November 27; ESPNU/ESPN2
1	Arizona	66
8	Drexel	62
3	Alabama	64
2	Duke	74

Championship; November 29; ESPN
1	Arizona	72
2	Duke	66
3rd Place Game; ESPN2
Drexel	85
Alabama	83

=== 2012 ===
First Round; November 12
1	Michigan	91
IUPUI	54
7	Cleveland State	79
Bowling Green	73
4	Pittsburgh	86
Fordham	51
5	Lehigh	89
6	Robert Morris	60
3	Kansas State	79
Lamar	55
North Texas	75
Alabama-Huntsville	78
2	Virginia	54
Fairfield	45
8	Delaware	84
Penn	69

Quarterfinals; November 13
1	Michigan	77
7	Cleveland State	47
4	Pittsburgh	78
5	Lehigh	53
3	Kansas State	87
Alabama-Huntsville	26
2	Virginia	53
8	Delaware	59

Semifinals; November 21
1	Michigan	67
4	Pittsburgh	62
3	Kansas State	66
8	Delaware	63

Championship; November 23; ESPN
1	Michigan	71
3	Kansas State	57

=== 2011 ===
First Round
1	Syracuse	95
Manhattan	56
Albany	77
Brown	68
4	Virginia Tech	91
Monmouth	46
5	George Mason	76
FIU	79
3	Stanford	75
Fresno State	59
7	Colorado State	75
SMU	56
2	Oklahoma State	73
Arkansas-Pine Bluff	46
6	Oral Roberts	77
8	UTSA	78

Quarterfinals
1	Syracuse	98
Albany	74
4	Virginia Tech	78
FIU	63
3	Stanford	64
7	Colorado State	52
2	Oklahoma State	90
8	UTSA	85

Semifinals
1	Syracuse	69
4	Virginia Tech	58
3	Stanford	82
2	Oklahoma State	67

Championship
1	Syracuse	69
3	Stanford	63

=== 2010 ===
First Round
1	Villanova	84
Marist	47
7	George Washington	67
Boston University	76
4	UCLA	79
Pepperdine	69
8	Nevada	53
Pacific	64
3	Wake Forest	63
Hampton	56
5	VCU	67
Winthrop	54
2	Tennessee	85
Belmont	76
6	Missouri State	80
Arkansas State	71

Quarterfinals
1	Villanova	82
Boston University	66
4	UCLA	57
Pacific	44
3	Wake Forest	69
5	VCU	90
2	Tennessee	60
6	Missouri State	56

Semifinals
1	Villanova	82
4	UCLA	70
5	VCU	72
2	Tennessee	77

Championship
1	Villanova	68
2	Tennessee	78

=== 2009 ===
First Round
1	Duke	74
Coastal Carolina	49
8	Charlotte	75
Elon	61
4	Arizona State	84
Texas State	62
7	TCU	83
Cal State Northridge	65
3	LSU	56
Indiana State	45
5	Western Kentucky	69
Milwaukee	65
6	Hofstra	68
Yale	63
2	Connecticut	77
Colgate	63

Quarterfinals
1	Duke	101
8	Charlotte	59
4	Arizona State	52
7	TCU	49
3	LSU	71
5	Western Kentucky	67
6	Hofstra	67
2	Connecticut	76

Semifinals
1	Duke	64
4	Arizona State	53
3	LSU	55
2	Connecticut	81

Championship
1	Duke	68
2	Connecticut	59

=== 2008 ===
First Round
E1	Boston College	90
E4	Loyola (MD)	57
E2	St John's	86
E3	Cornell	75
M1	Purdue	87
M4	Eastern Michigan	58
M2	Georgia	53
M3	Loyola (IL)	74
W1	Arizona	75
W4	Florida Atlantic	62
W2	UAB	64
W3	Santa Clara	61
S1	Oklahoma	94
S4	Mississippi Valley State	53
S2	Davidson	99
S3	James Madison	64

Quarterfinals
E1	Boston College	82
E2	St John's	70
M1	Purdue	78
M3	Loyola	46
W1	Arizona	71
W2	UAB	72
S1	Oklahoma	82
S2	Davidson	78

Semifinals
E1	Boston College	64
M1	Purdue	71
W2	UAB	67
S1	Oklahoma	77

Championship
M1	Purdue	82
S1	Oklahoma	87

=== 2007 ===
First Round
E1	Syracuse	97
E4	Siena	89
E2	Saint Joseph's	86
E3	Fairleigh Dickinson	66
M1	Ohio State	91
M4	Wisconsin–Green Bay	68
M2	Columbia	47
M3	Delaware State	41
W1	Washington	88
W4	New Jersey Institute of Technology	47
W2	Utah	77
W3	High Point	64
S1	Texas A&M	67
S4	Oral Roberts	53
S2	Texas–El Paso	77
S3	Texas A&M–Corpus Christi	62

Quarterfinals
E1	Syracuse	72
E2	St. Joseph's	69
M1	Ohio State	68
M2	Columbia	54
W1	Washington	83
W2	Utah	77
S1	Texas A&M	81
S2	Texas–El Paso	76

Semifinals
E1	Syracuse	65
M1	Ohio State	79
W1	Washington	63
S1	Texas A&M	77

Championship
M1	Ohio State	47
S1	Texas A&M	70
