= 2016–17 East Carolina Pirates men's basketball team =

American college basketball season

2016–17 East Carolina Pirates men's basketball
- Conference: American Athletic Conference
- Record: 15–18 (6–12 AAC)
- Head coach: Jeff Lebo (7th season)
- Assistant coaches: Mike Netti; Michael Perry; Ken Potosnak
- Home arena: Williams Arena (8,000)

2016–17 American Athletic Conference men's basketball standings
	Conf.				Overall
Team	W		L	PCT	W		L	PCT
No. 11 SMU †	17	–	1	.944	30	–	5	.857
No. 18 Cincinnati	16	–	2	.889	30	–	6	.833
Houston	12	–	6	.667	21	–	11	.656
UCF	11	–	7	.611	24	–	12	.667
Memphis	9	–	9	.500	19	–	13	.594
UConn	9	–	9	.500	16	–	17	.485
Tulsa	8	–	10	.444	15	–	17	.469
Temple	7	–	11	.389	16	–	16	.500
East Carolina	6	–	12	.333	15	–	18	.455
Tulane	3	–	15	.167	6	–	25	.194
South Florida	1	–	17	.056	7	–	23	.233
† 2017 AAC tournament winner Rankings from AP poll

The 2016–17 East Carolina Pirates men's basketball team represented East Carolina University during the 2016–17 NCAA Division I men's basketball season. The Pirates were led by seventh year head coach Jeff Lebo and played their home games at Williams Arena at Minges Coliseum as third year members of the American Athletic Conference. They finished the season 15–18, 6–12 in AAC play to finish in ninth place. They defeated Temple in the first round of the AAC tournament to advance to the quarterfinals where they lost to SMU.

On January 16, 2017, head coach Jeff Lebo underwent hip surgery and was unable to coach for the rest of the season. Assistant coach Michael Perry took over as acting head coach beginning with the January 22 game.

== Previous season ==
The Pirates finished the 2015–16 season with a record of 12–20, 4–14 in AAC play to finish in a tie for ninth place in conference. They lost to South Florida in the first round of the AAC tournament.

== Departures ==
Name	Number	Pos.	Height	Weight	Year	Hometown	Notes
Grant Bryant	1	F	6'7"	200	Sophomore	Kennesaw, GA	Transferred to Tampa
Charles Foster	3	G	6'0"	160	Junior	Louisville, KY	Graduate transferred to Kentucky Wesleyan
Prince Williams	4	G	6'5"	200	Senior	Raleigh, NC	Walk-on; graduated
Lance Tejada	5	G	6'2"	190	Sophomore	Pompano Beach, FL	Transferred to Lehigh
Drew Bost	24	G	5'10"	175	Senior	Raleigh, NC	Walk-on; graduated
Peyton Robbins	31	G	6'3"	210	Senior	Raleigh, NC	Walk-on; graduated
Michael Zangari	34	F	6'9"	240	Senior	Etters, PA	Graduated
Marshall Guilmette	41	F	6'10"	250	RS Junior	Kennesaw, GA	Career season ending injury
Kanu Aja	44	F	6'9"	255	Senior	Baltimore, MD	Graduated

=== Incoming transfers ===
Name	Number	Pos.	Height	Weight	Year	Hometown	Previous School
Isaac Fleming	5	G	6'3"	180	Junior	Wilmington, DE	Transferred from Hawaii. Under NCAA transfer rules, Fleming will have to sit out for the 2016–17 season. Will have two years of remaining eligibility.
Andre Washington	31	C	7'0"	240	Senior	Roanoke, VA	Transferred from Wake Forest. Will be eligible to play immediately since Washington graduated from Wake Forest.

== Incoming recruits ==
College recruiting information
Name	Hometown	School	Height	Weight	Commit date
Raquan Wilkins #41 SF	Atlanta, GA	Westlake High School	6 ft 5 in (1.96 m)	180 lb (82 kg)	Mar 30, 2016
Raquan Wilkins #41 SF	Recruit ratings: Scout: Rivals: (76)				
Elijah Hughes #44 SF	Somers, NY	Kennedy Catholic High School	6 ft 5 in (1.96 m)	190 lb (86 kg)	Jun 10, 2015
Elijah Hughes #44 SF	Recruit ratings: Scout: Rivals: (76)				
Jeremy Carter-Sheppard #63 SG	Chesterfield, VA	John Marshall High School	6 ft 1 in (1.85 m)	165 lb (75 kg)	Jun 12, 2016
Jeremy Carter-Sheppard #63 SG	Recruit ratings: Scout: Rivals: (72)				
Shawn Williams; PG	Maumelle, AR	Southwest Christian Academy	6 ft 0 in (1.83 m)	160 lb (73 kg)	Sep 11, 2015
Shawn Williams; PG	Recruit ratings: Scout: Rivals: (NR)				
Overall recruit ranking:
Note: In many cases, Scout, Rivals, 247Sports, On3, and ESPN may conflict in their listings of height and weight.; In these cases, the average was taken. ESPN grades are on a 100-point scale.; Sources: "2016 Team Ranking". Rivals.

=== Recruiting class of 2017 ===
College recruiting information (2017)
Name	Hometown	School	Height	Weight	Commit date
K.J. Davis; SG	Portsmouth, VA	I. C. Norcom High School	6 ft 5 in (1.96 m)	N/A	Aug 3, 2016
K.J. Davis; SG	Recruit ratings: Scout: Rivals: (NR)				
Overall recruit ranking:
Note: In many cases, Scout, Rivals, 247Sports, On3, and ESPN may conflict in their listings of height and weight.; In these cases, the average was taken. ESPN grades are on a 100-point scale.; Sources: "2017 Team Ranking". Rivals.

== Roster ==
2016–17 East Carolina Pirates men's basketball team
Players
Coaches

Pos.	#	Name	Height	Weight	Year	Previous school	Hometown
C	0	Deng Riak	6 ft 10 in (2.08 m)	225 lb (102 kg)	So	Victory Rock Prep	Melbourne, Australia
G	1	Jeremy Sheppard	6 ft 1 in (1.85 m)	160 lb (73 kg)	Fr	John Marshall	Richmond, VA
G	2	Caleb White	6 ft 7 in (2.01 m)	205 lb (93 kg)	Sr	Virginia Episcopal	Buckingham, VA
G	4	Elijah Hughes	6 ft 6 in (1.98 m)	220 lb (100 kg)	Fr	John F. Kennedy	Somers, NY
G	5	Isaac Fleming (I) (redshirt)	6 ft 3 in (1.91 m)	210 lb (95 kg)	Jr	National Christian Academy; Hawaii	Wilmington, DE
F	13	Michel Nzege	6 ft 8 in (2.03 m)	220 lb (100 kg)	RS Sr	Mount Zion; Winston-Salem State	Geneva, Switzerland
G/F	15	Kentrell Barkley	6 ft 5 in (1.96 m)	205 lb (93 kg)	So	Northern	Durham, NC
G	21	B. J. Tyson	6 ft 3 in (1.91 m)	180 lb (82 kg)	Jr	Anson	Wadesboro, NC
G	22	Raquan Wilkins	6 ft 5 in (1.96 m)	185 lb (84 kg)	Fr	Westlake	Atlanta, GA
F	23	Clarence Williams	6 ft 8 in (2.03 m)	195 lb (88 kg)	Sr	Druid Hills; Trinity Valley CC	Tallahassee, FL
F	25	Jabari Craig	6 ft 10 in (2.08 m)	235 lb (107 kg)	Jr	Tucker; Pearl River CC	Maumelle, AR
C	31	Andre Washington	7 ft 1 in (2.16 m)	235 lb (107 kg)	Sr	Wake Forest	Roanoke, VA
G	52	Justice Obasohan (W)	6 ft 5 in (1.96 m)	200 lb (91 kg)	So	NC School of Science and Math	Wallace, NC
G	55	Shawn Williams (I)	6 ft 0 in (1.83 m)	165 lb (75 kg)	Fr	Southwest Christian Academy	Maumelle, AR

Head coach

- Jeff Lebo (North Carolina)

Assistant coach(es)

- Mike Netti (Syracuse)
- Michael Perry (Richmond)
- Ken Potosnak (Randolph–Macon)

Legend

- (C) Team captain
- (S) Suspended
- (I) Ineligible
- (W) Walk-on
- Injured
- Current redshirt

Roster

== Schedule and results ==
Date time, TV	Rank^{#}	Opponent^{#}	Result	Record	Site (attendance) city, state
Non-conference regular season
11/11/2016*; 8:00 pm, ESPN3		Grambling State	W 72–57	1–0	Williams Arena (4,805); Greenville, NC
11/14/2016*; 7:00 pm, ESPN3		North Carolina A&T	W 61–51	2–0	Williams Arena (4,177); Greenville, NC
11/17/2016*; 7:00 pm		at Charlotte	L 64–76	2–1	Dale F. Halton Arena (4,281); Charlotte, NC
11/20/2016*; 1:00 pm, ESPN3		Stetson; Savannah Invitational	W 73–50	3–1	Williams Arena (3,387); Greenville, NC
11/22/2016*; 7:00 pm, ESPN3		Florida A&M; Savannah Invitational	W 82–62	4–1	Williams Arena (3,341); Greenville, NC
11/25/2016*; 5:00 pm, ESPN3		vs. Mercer; Savannah Invitational semifinals	L 66–70	4–2	Savannah Civic Center; Savannah, GA
11/26/2016*; 5:00 pm		vs. Air Force; Savannah Invitational	W 70–63	4–2	Savannah Civic Center; Savannah, GA
11/29/2016*; 7:00 pm, ESPN3		Hampton	W 68–48	6–2	Williams Arena (3,631); Greenville, NC
12/03/2016*; 5:00 pm, ESPN3		North Carolina Central	W 69–56	7–2	Williams Arena (4,638); Greenville, NC
12/06/2016*; 7:00 pm, RSN		at No. 14 Virginia	L 53–76	7–3	John Paul Jones Arena (13,813); Charlottesville, VA
12/15/2016*; 7:00 pm, ASN/ESPN3		College of Charleston	L 35–53	7–4	Williams Arena (3,462); Greenville, NC
12/20/2016*; 6:30 pm		at UNC Wilmington	L 71–81	7–5	Trask Coliseum (5,200); Wilmington, NC
12/22/2016*; 7:00 pm, ESPN3		Presbyterian	W 76–56	8–5	Williams Arena (3,667); Greenville, NC
AAC regular season
12/28/2016; 7:00 pm, ESPNews		South Florida	W 60–49	9–5 (1–0)	Williams Arena (4,163); Greenville, NC
12/31/2016; 12:00 pm, ASN/ESPN3		SMU	L 44-75	9–6 (1–1)	Williams Arena (3,698); Greenville, NC
01/03/2017; 7:15 pm, ESPNews		at UCF	L 45–48	9–7 (1–2)	CFE Arena (3,088); Orlando, FL
01/07/2017; 12:00 pm, ASN/ESPN3		at Temple	L 62–81	9–8 (1–3)	Liacouras Center (5,613); Philadelphia, PA
01/11/2017; 6:00 pm, ESPNews		Houston	L 58–74	9–9 (1–4)	Williams Arena (4,197); Greenville, NC
01/15/2017; 4:00 pm, CBSSN		No. 22 Cincinnati	L 46–55	9–10 (1–5)	Williams Arena (4,597); Greenville, NC
01/22/2017; 6:00 pm, CBSSN		at UConn	L 65–72	9–11 (1–6)	XL Center (5,676); Hartford, CT
01/25/2017; 7:00 pm, ESPN3		Tulsa	W 69–66	10–11 (2–6)	Williams Arena (3,537); Greenville, NC
1/28/2017; 3:30 pm, ESPNews		at Memphis	L 50–57	10–12 (2–7)	FedEx Forum (10,684); Memphis, TN
02/01/2017; 9:30 pm, ESPNews		at SMU	L 46–86	10–13 (2–8)	Moody Coliseum (6,723); Dallas, TX
02/04/2017; 2:00 pm, ASN/ESPN3		Tulane	W 74–65	11–13 (3–8)	Williams Arena (4,177); Greenville, NC
02/11/2017; 8:00 pm, ESPNU		at South Florida	L 57–64	11–14 (3–9)	USF Sun Dome (2,901); Tampa, FL
02/15/2017; 7:00 pm, ESPNews		Temple	W 78–64	12–14 (4–9)	Williams Arena (3,741); Greenville, NC
02/18/2017; 4:00 pm, ESPNews		UCF	L 58–61	12–15 (4–10)	Williams Arena (4,518); Greenville, NC
02/21/2017; 9:00 pm, ESPNU		at Tulane	W 76–73	13–15 (5–10)	Devlin Fieldhouse (1,142); New Orleans, LA
02/26/2017; 4:00 pm, ESPNU		at Tulsa	L 66–74	13–16 (5–11)	Reynolds Center (4,449); Tulsa, OK
03/01/2017; 7:00 pm, ESPNU		UConn	W 66–62	14–16 (6–11)	Williams Arena (4,354); Greenville, NC
03/05/2017; 4:00 pm, CBSSN		at Houston	L 51–73	14–17 (6–12)	Hofheinz Pavilion (8,479); Houston, TX
AAC tournament
03/09/17; 3:30 pm, ESPNU	(9)	vs. (8) Temple; First round	W 80–69	15–17	XL Center (4,874); Hartford, CT
03/10/17; 12:00 pm, ESPN2	(9)	vs. (1) No. 12 SMU; Quarterfinals	L 77–81	15–18	XL Center (1,844); Hartford, CT
*Non-conference game. ^{#}Rankings from AP Poll. (#) Tournament seedings in parentheses. All times are in Eastern Time.
