= Tim Jankovich =

American basketball coach (born 1959)

Biographical details
- Born: June 4, 1959 (age 67); Gary, Indiana, U.S.

Playing career
- 1977–1978: Washington State
- 1979–1982: Kansas State

Coaching career (HC unless noted)
- 1983–1984: Texas–Pan American (GA)
- 1984–1986: Kansas State (assistant)
- 1986–1987: Texas (assistant)
- 1987–1991: Colorado State (associate HC)
- 1991–1992: Baylor (assistant)
- 1992–1993: Oklahoma State (assistant)
- 1993–1997: North Texas
- 1997–1999: Hutchinson CC
- 1999–2002: Vanderbilt (assistant)
- 2002–2003: Illinois (assistant)
- 2003–2007: Kansas (assistant)
- 2007–2012: Illinois State
- 2012–2016: SMU (associate HC)
- 2016–2022: SMU

Head coaching record
- Overall: 282–185 (.604) (college)
- Tournaments: 0–1 (NCAA Division I); 3–6 (NIT)

Accomplishments and honors

Championships
- AAC tournament (2017); AAC regular season (2017)

Awards
- AAC Coach of the Year (2017); USBWA District 7 Coach of the Year (2017)

Timothy Robert Jankovich (born June 4, 1959) is an American former college basketball coach and former head coach at Southern Methodist University. During his first year (2007–08) at Illinois State, Jankovich led the Redbirds to a 13–5 second-place finish in the Missouri Valley Conference – even though pre-season polls voted the team to be a fifth-place finisher. He was an assistant basketball coach at Kansas for four years, and served under current Kansas head coach Bill Self at Kansas and Illinois.

He has also served as an assistant coach at Kansas State, Colorado State, Oklahoma State, Texas and Vanderbilt. He played college basketball at Washington State and Kansas State.

While at Colorado State, his teams posted three consecutive winning seasons en route to the best period of college basketball in school history. He also served for four years as the head basketball coach at North Texas. The team had gone 5–22 the previous season, but Jankovich engineered the second-largest turnaround in the nation that year.

== Biography ==
At Kansas State, Jankovich remains one of the winningest players in school history, playing under coach Jack Hartman. He was a four-year starter at point guard, but played his freshman season at Washington State. A three-time academic All-American and honorable mention All-Big Eight player, Jankovich finished his career at Kansas State in the school's top-10 in nine categories, including first in season free-throw percentage (.917) and eighth in career field-goal percentage (.510). In addition, he holds the Big Eight tournament record for single-game assists (14).

On April 26, 2012, SMU announced Jankovich as its associate head coach and coach-in-waiting, and he was announced as head coach on July 8, 2016. On March 7, 2017, Jankovich was selected as the coach of the year for USBWA district VII. On March 9, 2017, he was named American Athletic Conference Coach of the year.

On March 22, 2022, Jankovich announced his retirement.

Jankovich and his wife, Cindy, have a son, Michael. The family resides in Dallas, Texas.

== Head coaching record ==
=== College ===
Record table
Season	Team	Overall	Conference	Standing	Postseason
North Texas Mean Green (Southland Conference) (1993–1996)
1993–94	North Texas	14–15	9–9	4th	
1994–95	North Texas	14–13	9–9	4th	
1995–96	North Texas	15–13	12–6	2nd	
North Texas Mean Green (Big West Conference) (1996–1997)
1996–97	North Texas	10–16	5–11	5th (East)	
North Texas:		53–57 (.482)	35–35 (.500)		
Illinois State Redbirds (Missouri Valley Conference) (2007–2012)
2007–08	Illinois State	25–10	13–5	2nd	NIT second round
2008–09	Illinois State	24–10	11–7	3rd	NIT first round
2009–10	Illinois State	22–11	11–7	3rd	NIT first round
2010–11	Illinois State	12–19	4–14	T–9th	
2011–12	Illinois State	21–14	9–9	T–3rd	NIT second round
Illinois State:		104–64 (.619)	48–42 (.533)		
SMU Mustangs (American Athletic Conference) (2016–2022)
2015–16	SMU	9–0 (Note: Jankovich served as interim head coach during the first nine games of the 2015–16 season and is credited by SMU with those victories.)	0–0		
2016–17	SMU	30–5	17–1	1st	NCAA Division I Round of 64
2017–18	SMU	17–16	6–12	9th	
2018–19	SMU	15–17	6–12	T–9th	
2019–20	SMU	19–11	9–9	7th	No postseason held
2020–21	SMU	11–6	7–4	4th	NIT first round
2021–22	SMU	24–9	13–4	2nd	NIT second round
SMU:		125–64 (.661)	58–42 (.580)		
Total:		282–185 (.604)	141–119 (.542)		
National champion Postseason invitational champion Conference regular season champion Conference regular season and conference tournament champion Division regular season champion Division regular season and conference tournament champion Conference tournament champion

=== Junior college ===
Record table
Season	Team	Overall	Conference	Standing	Postseason
Hutchinson Blue Dragons (Kansas Jayhawk Community College Conference) (1997–1999)
1997–98	Hutchinson	27–6	12–4	3rd	
1998–99	Hutchinson	23–8	10–6	T–3rd	
Hutchinson:		50–14 (.781)	22–8 (.733)		
Total:		50–14 (.781)	22–8 (.733)		
