= German School of Thessaloniki =

- Deutsche Schule Thessaloniki; Γερμανική Σχολή Θεσσαλονίκης

Location
- Thessaloniki-Thermi km 9 (PO-Box 51) GR-55102 Thessaloniki-Finikas Greece; Τ.Θ. 51 - Φοίνικας ΤΚ-55102 Θεσσαλονίκη Ελλάδα; Thessaloniki; Greece; 40.5757°N 22.9861°E

Information
- Type: German international school
- Established: 1888
- Principal: Thomas Reusch
- Language: German/Greek
- Colors: black, red, yellow, blue, white
- Website: dst.gr

The German School of Thessaloniki (Greek: Γερμανική Σχολή Θεσσαλονίκης, German: Deutsche Schule Thessaloniki) is a German international school in Finikas, Thessaloniki, Greece. The school serves Kindergarten through Year 12 of Sekundarstufe II/Lykeion (senior high school/sixth form).

It was established on 13 February 1888, in Salonika, Salonika Vilayet, Ottoman Empire.

== See also ==
- Education in the Ottoman Empire
