= 2016–17 Omaha Mavericks men's basketball team =

American college basketball season

2016–17 Omaha Mavericks men's basketball
- Conference: The Summit League
- Record: 18–14 (9–7 The Summit)
- Head coach: Derrin Hansen (12th season)
- Assistant coaches: Pat Eberhart; Tyler Erwin; Tyler Bullock
- Home arena: Baxter Arena

2016–17 Summit League men's basketball standings
	Conf.				Overall
Team	W		L	PCT	W		L	PCT
South Dakota	12	–	4	.750	22	–	12	.647
North Dakota State	11	–	5	.688	19	–	11	.633
Omaha	9	–	7	.563	18	–	14	.563
Fort Wayne	8	–	8	.500	20	–	13	.606
Denver	8	–	8	.500	16	–	14	.533
South Dakota State †	8	–	8	.500	18	–	17	.514
IUPUI	7	–	9	.438	14	–	18	.438
Western Illinois	5	–	11	.313	8	–	20	.286
Oral Roberts	4	–	12	.250	8	–	22	.267
† 2017 Summit League Tournament winner

The 2016–17 Omaha Mavericks men's basketball team represented the University of Nebraska Omaha during the 2016–17 NCAA Division I men's basketball season. The Mavericks, led by 12th-year head coach Derrin Hansen, played their home games at Baxter Arena and were members of The Summit League. They finished the season 18–14, 9–7 in Summit League play to finish in third place. They beat Fort Wayne and IUPUI before losing to South Dakota State in the Summit League tournament championship.

== Previous season ==
The Mavericks finished the 2015–16 season 18–14, 10–6 in Summit League play to finish in third place. They lost in the quarterfinals of The Summit League tournament to Denver. They were invited to the College Basketball Invitational where they lost in the first round to Duquesne.

== Roster ==
2016–17 Omaha Mavericks men's basketball team
Players
Coaches

Pos.	#	Name	Height	Weight	Year	Hometown
G	0	JT Gibson	6 ft 3 in (1.91 m)	195 lb (88 kg)	RS Fr	Brooklyn Park, Minnesota
G	1	Renard Suggs	6 ft 2 in (1.88 m)	210 lb (95 kg)	Sr	St. Paul, Minnesota
G	4	Kyler Erickson	6 ft 0 in (1.83 m)	190 lb (86 kg)	Sr	Omaha, Nebraska
G	5	K. J. Robinson	6 ft 0 in (1.83 m)	190 lb (86 kg)	Fr	Blue Springs, Missouri
G	11	Alex Allbery	6 ft 1 in (1.85 m)	205 lb (93 kg)	Jr	Omaha, Nebraska
G	13	Daniel Norl	6 ft 3 in (1.91 m)	200 lb (91 kg)	Jr	Clarksville, Tennessee
F	15	Tre'Shawn Thurman	6 ft 7 in (2.01 m)	230 lb (104 kg)	Jr	Omaha, Nebraska
G	21	Zach Jackson	6 ft 5 in (1.96 m)	185 lb (84 kg)	So	Wichita, Kansas
G	23	Marcus Tyus	6 ft 1 in (1.85 m)	190 lb (86 kg)	Sr	Ramsey, Minnesota
G	24	Tra-Deon Hollins	6 ft 2 in (1.88 m)	195 lb (88 kg)	Sr	Omaha, Nebraska
F	32	Daniel Meyer	6 ft 9 in (2.06 m)	250 lb (113 kg)	Jr	Billings, Montana
C	33	Zach Pirog	6 ft 10 in (2.08 m)	220 lb (100 kg)	So	Highlands Ranch, Colorado
F	44	Mitch Hahn	6 ft 8 in (2.03 m)	210 lb (95 kg)	So	Fremont, Nebraska
F	52	Ben Kositzke	6 ft 8 in (2.03 m)	210 lb (95 kg)	RS Fr	Omaha, Nebraska

Head coach

- Derrin Hansen (Nebraska Wesleyan)

Assistant coach(es)

- Pat Eberhart (Adams State)
- Tyler Erwin (Midland)
- Tyler Bullock (Omaha)

Legend

- (C) Team captain
- (S) Suspended
- (I) Ineligible
- (W) Walk-on
- Injured
- Current redshirt

Roster

== Schedule and results ==
Date time, TV	Rank^{#}	Opponent^{#}	Result	Record	Site (attendance) city, state
Regular season
11/12/2016*; 4:00 pm		at UC Santa Barbara	W 74–60	1–0	UCSB Events Center (1,708); Santa Barbara, CA
11/13/2016*; 6:00 pm, P12N		at USC	L 72–82	1–1	Galen Center (2,993); Los Angeles, CA
11/15/2016*; 7:00 pm, FS Kansas City		at Kansas State	L 68–81	1–2	Bramlage Coliseum (10,751); Manhattan, KS
11/19/2016*; 1:00 pm		Rice	L 87–100	1–3	Baxter Arena (1,814); Omaha, NE
11/22/2016*; 7:00 pm		Buena Vista	W 112–65	2–3	Baxter Arena (1,232); Omaha, NE
11/26/2016*; 12:00 pm, ESPN3		at Eastern Michigan	L 77–94	2–4	Convocation Center (578); Ypsilanti, MI
11/30/2016*; 9:30 pm		at Cal State Fullerton	W 83–73	3–4	Titan Gym (637); Fullerton, CA
12/03/2016*; 1:00 pm, BTN+		at Iowa	W 98–89	4–4	Carver–Hawkeye Arena (11,618); Iowa City, IA
12/05/2016*; 7:00 pm		at No. 25 Iowa State	L 47–91	4–5	Hilton Coliseum (14,005); Ames, IA
12/10/2016*; 7:00 pm		Montana State	W 97–91	5–5	Baxter Arena (1,511); Omaha, NE
12/15/2016*; 6:30 pm		at UMKC	W 80–75	6–5	Municipal Auditorium (1,216); Kansas City, MO
12/18/2016*; 3:00 pm		Cal State Fullerton	W 102–96 ^{OT}	7–5	Baxter Arena (1,128); Omaha, NE
12/21/2016*; 6:00 pm, ACC Extra		at Pittsburgh	L 75–94	7–6	Petersen Events Center (7,009); Pittsburgh, PA
Summit League regular season
12/29/2016; 7:00 pm, ESPN3		at South Dakota	L 69–86	7–7 (0–1)	Sanford Coyote Sports Center (1,665); Vermillion, SD
12/31/2016; 2:00 pm		at North Dakota State	L 70–82	7–8 (0–2)	Scheels Center (3,176); Fargo, ND
01/04/2017; 7:00 pm		Fort Wayne	L 78–80	7–9 (0–3)	Baxter Arena (1,559); Omaha, NE
01/07/2017; 4:30 pm, ESPN3		at South Dakota State	W 101–93	8–9 (1–3)	Frost Arena (2,230); Brookings, SD
01/11/2017; 6:00 pm		at IUPUI	W 79–71	9–9 (2–3)	Indiana Farmers Coliseum (842); Indianapolis, IN
01/14/2017; 7:00 pm		Western Illinois	W 86–72	10–9 (3–3)	Baxter Arena (1,813); Omaha, NE
01/18/2017; 7:00 pm		Denver	W 97–88	11–9 (4–3)	Baxter Arena (1,504); Omaha, NE
01/21/2017; 3:00 pm, ESPN3		at Oral Roberts	L 86–103	11–10 (4–4)	Mabee Center (3,048); Tulsa, OK
01/28/2017; 7:00 pm		South Dakota State	L 84–88	11–11 (4–5)	Baxter Arena (3,038); Omaha, NE
02/01/2017; 7:00 pm		South Dakota	W 91–83	12–11 (5–5)	Baxter Arena (1,592); Omaha, NE
02/04/2017; 7:00 pm, ESPN3		at Western Illinois	W 79–67	13–11 (6–5)	Western Hall (887); Macomb, IL
02/08/2017; 7:00 pm		IUPUI	L 78–89	13–12 (6–6)	Baxter Arena (1,678); Omaha, NE
02/11/2017; 6:00 pm		at Fort Wayne	L 101–108 ^{OT}	13–13 (6–7)	Gates Sports Center (1,832); Fort Wayne, IN
02/16/2017; 7:00 pm		Oral Roberts	W 83–76	14–13 (7–7)	Baxter Arena (1,679); Omaha, NE
02/22/2017; 8:00 pm, ALT		at Denver	W 84–83	15–13 (8–7)	Magness Arena (1,642); Denver, CO
02/25/2017; 7:00 pm		North Dakota State	W 96–92	16–13 (9–7)	Baxter Arena (3,238); Omaha, NE
Summit League tournament
03/05/2017; 8:30 pm, ESPN3	(3)	vs. (6) Fort Wayne; Quarterfinals	W 84–80	17–13	Premier Center (9,837); Sioux Falls, SD
03/06/2017; 8:30 pm, ESPN3	(3)	vs. (7) IUPUI; Semifinals	W 90–62	18–13	Premier Center (11,235); Sioux Falls, SD
03/07/2017; 8:00 pm, ESPN2	(3)	vs. (4) South Dakota State; Championship	L 77–79	18–14	Premier Center (9,441); Sioux Falls, SD
*Non-conference game. ^{#}Rankings from AP Poll. (#) Tournament seedings in parentheses. All times are in Central Time Source.
