= 2016–17 Western Illinois Leathernecks men's basketball team =

American college basketball season

2016–17 Western Illinois Leathernecks men's basketball
- Conference: Summit League
- Record: 8–20 (5–11 The Summit)
- Head coach: Billy Wright (3rd season)
- Assistant coaches: Josh Wolfe; Jestin Anderson; Joshua Jones
- Home arena: Western Hall

2016–17 Summit League men's basketball standings
	Conf.				Overall
Team	W		L	PCT	W		L	PCT
South Dakota	12	–	4	.750	22	–	12	.647
North Dakota State	11	–	5	.688	19	–	11	.633
Omaha	9	–	7	.563	18	–	14	.563
Fort Wayne	8	–	8	.500	20	–	13	.606
Denver	8	–	8	.500	16	–	14	.533
South Dakota State †	8	–	8	.500	18	–	17	.514
IUPUI	7	–	9	.438	14	–	18	.438
Western Illinois	5	–	11	.313	8	–	20	.286
Oral Roberts	4	–	12	.250	8	–	22	.267
† 2017 Summit League Tournament winner

The 2016–17 Western Illinois Leathernecks men's basketball team represented Western Illinois University during the 2016–17 NCAA Division I men's basketball season. The Leathernecks, led by third-year head coach Billy Wright, played their home games at Western Hall in Macomb, Illinois as members of The Summit League. They finished the season 8–20, 5–11 in Summit League play to finish in eighth place. They lost in the quarterfinals of the Summit League tournament to South Dakota.

== Previous season ==
The Leathernecks finished the 2015–16 season 10–17, 3–13 in Summit League play to finish in last place. As a result, they failed to qualify for The Summit League tournament.

== Roster ==
2016–17 Western Illinois Leathernecks men's basketball team
Players
Coaches

Pos.	#	Name	Height	Weight	Year	Hometown
G	1	Jabari Sandifer	6 ft 1 in (1.85 m)	175 lb (79 kg)	Sr	Naperville, Illinois
G	10	Ryan Maas	6 ft 1 in (1.85 m)	170 lb (77 kg)	So	Pekin, Illinois
G	11	Delo Bruster	5 ft 11 in (1.8 m)	170 lb (77 kg)	So	Overland Park, Kansas
G	14	Lynrick Moxey	6 ft 2 in (1.88 m)	190 lb (86 kg)	Jr	Exuma, Bahamas
G/F	15	Dalan Ancrum	6 ft 6 in (1.98 m)	180 lb (82 kg)	Jr	Round Rock, Texas
F	22	Jalen Morgan	6 ft 8 in (2.03 m)	195 lb (88 kg)	RS So	Indianapolis, Indiana
F	24	James Claar	6 ft 8 in (2.03 m)	205 lb (93 kg)	So	Bolingbrook, Illinois
G	25	Noah Wells	6 ft 2 in (1.88 m)	175 lb (79 kg)	So	Champaign, Illinois
F	30	Mike Miklusak	6 ft 6 in (1.98 m)	190 lb (86 kg)	Sr	Dyer, Indiana
G	31	Garret Covington	6 ft 5 in (1.96 m)	195 lb (88 kg)	Sr	Edwardsville, Illinois
G	32	Jeremiah Usiosefe	6 ft 5 in (1.96 m)	215 lb (98 kg)	Fr	Hamilton, Ontario, Canada
C	34	Chris Snyder	6 ft 10 in (2.08 m)	235 lb (107 kg)	Jr	Cameron Park, California
G	40	C. J. Duff	6 ft 1 in (1.85 m)	185 lb (84 kg)	Fr	Waukegan, Illinois
C	44	Jordan Hughes	6 ft 10 in (2.08 m)	235 lb (107 kg)	So	Schaumburg, Illinois
C	52	Brandon Gilbeck	6 ft 11 in (2.11 m)	235 lb (107 kg)	So	Spring Green, Wisconsin

Head coach

- Billy Wright (Bradley)

Assistant coach(es)

- Josh Wolfe (Hope College)
- Jestin Anderson (Quincy)
- Joshua Jones (Eastern Kentucky)

Legend

- (C) Team captain
- (S) Suspended
- (I) Ineligible
- (W) Walk-on
- Injured
- Current redshirt

Roster

== Schedule and results ==
Date time, TV	Rank^{#}	Opponent^{#}	Result	Record	Site (attendance) city, state
Exhibition
11/03/2016*; 7:00 pm		Lincoln Christian	W 95–39		Western Hall; Macomb, IL
Non-conference regular season
11/11/2016*; 8:00 pm, FSKC		at Kansas State	L 55–82	0–1	Bramlage Coliseum (11,644); Manhattan, KS
11/13/2016*; 5:00 pm		Oak Hills Christian	W 95–48	1–1	Western Hall (572); Macomb, IL
11/16/2016*; 5:00 pm, ESPN3		Southeast Missouri State	L 71–74	1–2	Western Hall (801); Macomb, IL
11/19/2016*; 7:00 pm		at Eastern Illinois	L 64–73	1–3	Lantz Arena (392); Charleston, IL
11/23/2016*; 2:00 pm		Crown (MN)	W 91–53	2–3	Western Hall (263); Macomb, IL
11/26/2016*; 2:30 pm, ESPN3		at Miami (OH)	L 72–81	2–4	Millett Hall (1,083); Oxford, OH
11/29/2016*; 2:30 pm		at American	L 50–57	2–5	Bender Arena (686); Washington, D.C.
12/03/2016*; 2:00 pm, ESPN3		Chicago State	L 76–83	2–6	Western Hall (823); Macomb, IL
12/10/2016*; 2:00 pm		Eastern Illinois	L 49–63	2–7	Western Hall (1,002); Macomb, IL
12/17/2016*; 2:00 pm		at Milwaukee	W 75–59	3–7	Klotsche Center (893); Milwaukee, WI
12/19/2016*; 5:00 pm, BTN		at No. 15 Purdue	L 50–82	3–8	Mackey Arena (10,846); West Lafayette, IN
Summit League regular season
12/29/2016; 6:00 pm		at Fort Wayne	W 93–91	4–8 (1–0)	Gates Sports Center (1,345); Fort Wayne, IN
12/31/2016; 12:00 pm		at IUPUI	L 71–89	4–9 (1–1)	Indiana Farmers Coliseum (1,106); Indianapolis, IN
01/04/2017; 7:00 pm		South Dakota State	W 82–74	5–9 (2–1)	Western Hall (783); Macomb, IL
01/07/2017; 2:00 pm		Oral Roberts	W 86–71	6–9 (3–1)	Western Hall (813); Macomb, IL
01/11/2017; 8:00 pm		at Denver	L 70–84	6–10 (3–2)	Magness Arena (1,067); Denver, CO
01/14/2017; 7:00 pm		at Omaha	L 72–86	6–11 (3–3)	Baxter Arena (1,813); Omaha, NE
01/21/2017; 2:00 pm, ESPN3		North Dakota State	L 57–89	6–12 (3–4)	Western Hall (883); Macomb, IL
01/25/2017; 7:00 pm		at South Dakota	L 55–62	6–13 (3–5)	Sanford Coyote Sports Center (1,603); Vermillion, SD
01/28/2017; 7:00 pm		IUPUI	W 78–69	7–13 (4–5)	Western Hall (843); Macomb, IL
02/01/2017; 7:00 pm		at South Dakota State	L 65–98	7–14 (4–6)	Frost Arena (2,017); Brookings, SD
02/04/2017; 7:00 pm, ESPN3		Omaha	L 67–79	7–15 (4–7)	Western Hall (887); Macomb, IL
02/08/2017; 7:00 pm, ESPN3		at Oral Roberts	W 63–60	8–15 (5–7)	Mabee Center (3,040); Tulsa, OK
02/14/2017; 7:00 pm, ESPN3		Denver	L 72–78	8–16 (5–8)	Western Hall (804); Macomb, IL
02/18/2017; 4:00 pm, ESPN3		at North Dakota State	L 91–100 ^{2OT}	8–17 (5–9)	Scheels Center (4,696); Fargo, ND
02/23/2017; 7:00 pm, ESPN3		South Dakota	L 81–92	8–18 (5–10)	Western Hall (828); Macomb, IL
02/25/2017; 7:00 pm, ESPN3		Fort Wayne	L 92–96 ^{OT}	8–19 (5–11)	Western Hall (803); Macomb, IL
The Summit League tournament
03/04/2017; 6:00 pm, ESPN3	(8)	vs. (1) South Dakota; Quarterfinals	L 69–78 ^{OT}	8–20	Premier Center (9,399); Sioux Falls, SD
*Non-conference game. ^{#}Rankings from AP Poll. (#) Tournament seedings in parentheses. All times are in Central Time.
