= 2016–17 South Dakota Coyotes men's basketball team =

American college basketball season

2016–17 South Dakota Coyotes men's basketball

Summit League regular season champions

NIT, First round
- Conference: The Summit League
- Record: 22–12 (12–4 The Summit)
- Head coach: Craig Smith (3rd season)
- Assistant coaches: Gameli Ahelegbe; Austin Hansen; Eric Peterson
- Home arena: Sanford Coyote Sports Center

2016–17 Summit League men's basketball standings
	Conf.				Overall
Team	W		L	PCT	W		L	PCT
South Dakota	12	–	4	.750	22	–	12	.647
North Dakota State	11	–	5	.688	19	–	11	.633
Omaha	9	–	7	.563	18	–	14	.563
Fort Wayne	8	–	8	.500	20	–	13	.606
Denver	8	–	8	.500	16	–	14	.533
South Dakota State †	8	–	8	.500	18	–	17	.514
IUPUI	7	–	9	.438	14	–	18	.438
Western Illinois	5	–	11	.313	8	–	20	.286
Oral Roberts	4	–	12	.250	8	–	22	.267
† 2017 Summit League Tournament winner

The 2016–17 South Dakota Coyotes men's basketball team represented the University of South Dakota during the 2016–17 NCAA Division I men's basketball season. The Coyotes, led by second-year head coach Craig Smith, played their home games at the brand new Sanford Coyote Sports Center in Vermillion, South Dakota as members of Summit League. They finished the season 22–12, 12–4 in Summit League play to win the Summit League regular season championship. As the No. 1 seed in the Summit League tournament, they defeated Western Illinois in the quarterfinals before losing to South Dakota State in the semifinals. As a regular season conference champion who failed to win their conference tournament title, they received an automatic bid to the National Invitation Tournament where they lost in the first round to Iowa.

== Previous season ==
The Coyotes finished the 2015–16 season 14–18, 5–11 in Summit League play to finish in eighth place. They lost in the quarterfinals of The Summit League tournament to IPFW.

== Roster ==
2016–17 South Dakota Coyotes men's basketball team
Players
Coaches

Pos.	#	Name	Height	Weight	Year	Hometown
G	0	Trey Dickerson	6 ft 1 in (1.85 m)	—	Jr	Queens, New York
G	1	Jack Stensgard	6 ft 2 in (1.88 m)	—	Fr	Inver Grove Heights, Minnesota
G	2	Carlton Hurst	6 ft 3 in (1.91 m)	—	Jr	Denver, Colorado
G	3	Triston Simpson	6 ft 1 in (1.85 m)	—	Fr	Lincoln, Nebraska
G	5	Joshua Doss	6 ft 4 in (1.93 m)	—	Jr	Chicago, Illinois
F	12	Trey Burch-Manning	6 ft 6 in (1.98 m)	—	So	Federal Way, Washington
G	13	Matt Mooney	6 ft 3 in (1.91 m)	—	So	Wauconda, Illinois
G	20	Brandon Armstrong	6 ft 5 in (1.96 m)	—	Fr	San Antonio, Texas
G	22	Tyler Peterson	6 ft 4 in (1.93 m)	—	Fr	Lino Lakes, Minnesota
F	23	Tyler Flack	6 ft 7 in (2.01 m)	—	Sr	Lakeville, Minnesota
G	24	Brady Delimont	6 ft 3 in (1.91 m)	—	Fr	Ainsworth, Nebraska
F	25	Tyler Hagedorn	6 ft 10 in (2.08 m)	—	So	Norfolk, Nebraska
F	31	Dan Jech	6 ft 9 in (2.06 m)	—	So	Rochester, Minnesota
F	33	Logan Power	6 ft 4 in (1.93 m)	—	So	Lincoln, Nebraska
F	45	Austin Sparks	6 ft 8 in (2.03 m)	—	Jr	Denver, Colorado

Head coach

- Craig Smith (North Dakota)

Assistant coach(es)

- Gameli Ahelegbe (Minnesota State)
- Austin Hansen (South Dakota State)
- Eric Peterson (UW–La Crosse)

Legend

- (C) Team captain
- (S) Suspended
- (I) Ineligible
- (W) Walk-on
- Injured
- Current redshirt

Roster

== Schedule and results ==
Date time, TV	Rank^{#}	Opponent^{#}	Result	Record	Site (attendance) city, state
Exhibition
11/04/2016*; 7:00 pm		Loras	W 106–76		Sanford Coyote Sports Center (645); Vermillion, SD
Non-conference regular season
11/11/2016*; 8:30 pm		at Drake	W 79–74	1–0	Knapp Center (2,439); Des Moines, IA
11/13/2016*; 3:15 pm, ESPN3		Bowling Green	W 78–72	2–0	Sanford Coyote Sports Center (3,017); Vermillion, SD
11/16/2016*; 7:00 pm		Presentation	W 99–60	3–0	Sanford Coyote Sports Center (1,485); Vermillion, SD
11/17/2016*; 7:00 pm		Doane; Gulf Coast Showcase	W 80–46	4–0	Sanford Coyote Sports Center (1,456); Vermillion, SD
11/21/2016*; 4:00 pm		vs. Kent State; Gulf Coast Showcase quarterfinals	W 80–77	5–0	Germain Arena; Estero, FL
11/22/2016*; 6:30 pm		vs. Houston; Gulf Coast Showcase semifinals	L 58–85	5–1	Germain Arena; Estero, FL
11/23/2016*; 4:00 pm		vs. Hofstra; Gulf Coast Showcase 3rd place game	L 57–65	5–2	Germain Arena; Estero, FL
11/27/2016*; 1:00 pm		Montana	W 72–67	6–2	Sanford Coyote Sports Center (1,399); Vermillion, SD
11/30/2016*; 6:30 pm		at UMKC	L 82–84	6–3	Municipal Auditorium (1,230); Kansas City, MO
12/03/2016*; 1:00 pm, BTN+		at Nebraska	L 61–73	6–4	Pinnacle Bank Arena (15,642); Lincoln, NE
12/07/2016*; 8:15 pm		Montana State	W 74–57	7–4	Sanford Coyote Sports Center (1,800); Vermillion, SD
12/10/2016*; 1:00 pm		Sacramento State	W 72–56	8–4	Sanford Coyote Sports Center (1,515); Vermillion, SD
12/16/2016*; 7:30 pm		vs. Portland; Dam City Classic	L 82–85	8–5	Moda Center (6,521); Portland, OR
12/18/2016*; 3:00 pm		at Montana State	W 80–68	9–5	Brick Breeden Fieldhouse (2,128); Bozeman, MT
12/21/2016*; 8:00 pm, RTNW		at No. 7 Gonzaga	L 65–102	9–6	McCarthey Athletic Center (6,000); Spokane, WA
The Summit League regular season
12/29/2016; 7:00 pm, ESPN3		Omaha	W 86–69	10–6 (1–0)	Sanford Coyote Sports Center (1,665); Vermillion, SD
12/31/2016; 1:00 pm, ESPN3		at South Dakota State	L 72–73	10–7 (1–1)	Frost Arena (2,518); Brookings, SD
01/04/2017; 8:00 pm, ALT2		at Denver	W 75–69	11–7 (2–1)	Magness Arena (1,115); Denver, CO
01/07/2017; 3:15 pm, ESPN3		IUPUI	W 85–74	12–7 (3–1)	Sanford Coyote Sports Center (1,908); Vermillion, SD
01/11/2017; 7:00 pm, ESPN3		North Dakota State	L 69–70	12–8 (3–2)	Sanford Coyote Sports Center (2,582); Vermillion, SD
01/14/2017; 1:00 pm		Fort Wayne	W 66–63	13–8 (4–2)	Sanford Coyote Sports Center (1,905); Vermillion, SD
01/18/2017; 7:00 pm, ESPN3		at Oral Roberts	L 80–90	13–9 (4–3)	Mabee Center (2,401); Tulsa, OK
01/25/2017; 7:00 pm		Western Illinois	W 62–55	14–9 (5–3)	Sanford Coyote Sports Center (1,603); Vermillion, SD
01/28/2017; 3:15 pm, ESPN3		Denver	W 88–83	15–9 (6–3)	Sanford Coyote Sports Center (2,436); Vermillion, SD
02/01/2017; 7:00 pm		at Omaha	L 83–91	15–10 (6–4)	Baxter Arena (1,592); Omaha, NE
02/04/2017; 2:00 pm, ESPN3		at North Dakota State	W 76–66	16–10 (7–4)	Scheels Center (5,007); Fargo, ND
02/08/2017; 6:00 pm		at Fort Wayne	W 93–82	17–10 (8–4)	Memorial Coliseum (1,404); Fort Wayne, IN
02/11/2017; 1:00 pm, ESPN3		South Dakota State	W 91–89	18–10 (9–4)	Sanford Coyote Sports Center (5,265); Vermillion, SD
02/18/2017; 3:15 pm, ESPN3		Oral Roberts	W 86–72	19–10 (10–4)	Sanford Coyote Sports Center (2,659); Vermillion, SD
02/23/2017; 7:00 pm		at Western Illinois	W 92–81	20–10 (11–4)	Western Hall (828); Macomb, IL
02/25/2017; 6:00 pm		at IUPUI	W 92–85	21–10 (12–4)	Indiana Farmers Coliseum (1,255); Indianapolis, IN
The Summit League tournament
03/04/2017; 6:00 pm, ESPN3	(1)	vs. (8) Western Illinois; Quarterfinals	W 78–69 ^{OT}	22–10	Premier Center (9,399); Sioux Falls, SD
03/06/2017; 6:00 pm, ESPN3	(1)	vs. (4) South Dakota State; Semifinals	L 71–74	22–11	Premier Center (11,235); Sioux Falls, SD
NIT
03/15/2017*; 8:00 pm, ESPN2	(8)	at (1) Iowa; First round – Iowa Bracket	L 75–87	22–12	Carver–Hawkeye Arena (12,864); Iowa City, IA
*Non-conference game. ^{#}Rankings from AP Poll. (#) Tournament seedings in parentheses. All times are in Central Time.
