= 2016–17 Ball State Cardinals men's basketball team =

American college basketball season

2016–17 Ball State Cardinals men's basketball

MAC West division co-champions

CIT, First Round
- Conference: Mid-American Conference
- West Division
- Record: 21–13 (11–7 MAC)
- Head coach: James Whitford (4th season)
- Assistant coaches: Jason Grunkemeyer; Danny Peters; Brian Thornton
- Home arena: Worthen Arena

2016–17 Mid-American Conference men's basketball standings
| | Conf. | | | | Overall |
| Team | W | | L | PCT | W | | L | PCT |
|---|---|---|---|---|---|---|---|---|
East
| Akron | 14 | – | 4 | .778 | 27 | – | 9 | .750 |
| Ohio | 11 | – | 7 | .611 | 20 | – | 11 | .645 |
| Buffalo | 11 | – | 7 | .611 | 17 | – | 15 | .531 |
| Kent State † | 10 | – | 8 | .556 | 22 | – | 14 | .611 |
| Bowling Green | 7 | – | 11 | .389 | 13 | – | 19 | .406 |
| Miami (OH) | 4 | – | 14 | .222 | 11 | – | 21 | .344 |
West
| Ball State | 11 | – | 7 | .611 | 21 | – | 13 | .618 |
| Western Michigan | 11 | – | 7 | .611 | 16 | – | 16 | .500 |
| Toledo | 9 | – | 9 | .500 | 17 | – | 17 | .500 |
| Eastern Michigan | 7 | – | 11 | .389 | 16 | – | 17 | .485 |
| Northern Illinois | 7 | – | 11 | .389 | 15 | – | 17 | .469 |
| Central Michigan | 6 | – | 12 | .333 | 16 | – | 16 | .500 |
† 2017 MAC tournament winner

The 2016–17 Ball State Cardinals men's basketball team represented Ball State University during the 2016–17 NCAA Division I men's basketball season. The Cardinals, led by fourth-year head coach James Whitford, played their home games at Worthen Arena as members of the West Division of the Mid-American Conference. They finished the season 21–13, 11–7 in MAC play to finish in a tie for the West Division title. As the No. 4 seed in the MAC tournament they defeated Western Michigan in the quarterfinals to advance to the semifinals where they lost to Akron. They were invited to the CollegeInsider.com Tournament where they lost in the first round to Fort Wayne.

== Previous season ==
The Cardinals finished the 2015–16 season 21–14, 10–8 in MAC play to finish in a tie for the West Division championship. They lost to Miami (OH) in the first round of the MAC tournament. They were invited to the CollegeInsider.com Tournament where they defeated Tennessee State and UT Martin to advance to the Quarterfinals before losing to Columbia.

== Departures ==
| Name | Number | Pos. | Height | Weight | Year | Hometown | Notes |
|---|---|---|---|---|---|---|---|
| Naiel Smith | 1 | G | 6'4" | 200 | Junior | Brooklyn, NY | Graduate transferred to Texas Wesleyan |
| Rocco Belcaster | 5 | F | 6'7" | 221 | RS Junior | Berwyn, IL | Left the team for personal reasons |
| Bo Calhoun | 12 | F | 6'6" | 245 | Senior | South Bend, IN | Graduated |
| Gill Bik | 21 | F | 6'7" | 227 | Senior | Toronto, ON | Graduated |
| Jeremiah Davis | 24 | F | 6'4" | 210 | RS Senior | Muncie, IN | Graduated |
| Nate Wells | 52 | C | 7'1" | 247 | RS Senior | Davenport, IA | Graduated |

=== Incoming transfers ===
| Name | Number | Pos. | Height | Weight | Year | Hometown | Previous School |
|---|---|---|---|---|---|---|---|
| Jontrell Walker | 1 | G | 6'1" | 188 | Junior | Aurora, IL | Transferred from Incarnate Word. Under NCAA transfer rules, Walker will have to sit out for the 2016–17 season. Will have two years of remaining eligibility. |
| Doudou Gueye | 35 | C | 6'10" | 250 | Senior | Dakar, Senegal | Transferred from South Carolina. Will eligible to play since Gueye graduated from South Carolina. |

== Recruiting class of 2016 ==
College recruiting
| Name | Hometown | School | Height | Weight | Commit date |
|---|---|---|---|---|---|
| Kyle Mallers #32 SF | Fort Wayne, IN | Carroll High School | 6 ft 7 in (2.01 m) | 190 lb (86 kg) | Oct 15, 2015 |
| Kyle Mallers #32 SF | Recruit ratings: Scout: Rivals: (78) | | | | |
| Zach Hollywood; SF | Bourbonnais, IL | Bradley-Bourbonnais Community High School | 6 ft 9 in (2.06 m) | N/A | May 4, 2016 |
| Zach Hollywood; SF | Recruit ratings: Scout: Rivals: (NR) | | | | |
Overall recruit ranking:
Note: In many cases, Scout, Rivals, 247Sports, On3, and ESPN may conflict in their listings of height and weight.; In these cases, the average was taken. ESPN grades are on a 100-point scale.; Sources: "2016 Team Ranking". Rivals.

=== Recruiting class of 2017 ===
College recruiting (2017)
| Name | Hometown | School | Height | Weight | Commit date |
|---|---|---|---|---|---|
| Ishmael El-Amin #41 PG | Minnetonka, MN | Hopkins High School | 6 ft 0 in (1.83 m) | 165 lb (75 kg) | Sep 26, 2016 |
| Ishmael El-Amin #41 PG | Recruit ratings: Scout: Rivals: (78) | | | | |
Overall recruit ranking:
Note: In many cases, Scout, Rivals, 247Sports, On3, and ESPN may conflict in their listings of height and weight.; In these cases, the average was taken. ESPN grades are on a 100-point scale.; Sources: "2017 Team Ranking". Rivals.

== Roster ==
2016–17 Ball State Cardinals men's basketball team
Players
Coaches

| Pos. | # | Name | Height | Weight | Year | Previous school | Hometown |
|---|---|---|---|---|---|---|---|
| G | 0 | Francis Kiapway | 6 ft 3 in (1.91 m) | 190 lb (86 kg) | Fr | St. Thomas More (CT) | Hamilton, ON |
| G | 1 | Jontrell Walker (I) (redshirt) | 6 ft 1 in (1.85 m) | 182 lb (83 kg) | Jr | West Aurora; Incarnate Word | Aurora, IL |
| G | 2 | Tayler Persons | 6 ft 3 in (1.91 m) | 220 lb (100 kg) | RS So | Kokomo; Northern Kentucky | Kokomo, IN |
| G | 3 | Josh Thompson (W) | 6 ft 1 in (1.85 m) | 201 lb (91 kg) | RS Fr | Lawrence North | Indianapolis, IN |
| G | 11 | Kaleb Mallory (W) | 5 ft 8 in (1.73 m) | 168 lb (76 kg) | Sr | Muncie Central | Muncie, IN |
| F | 14 | Kyle Mallers | 6 ft 7 in (2.01 m) | 225 lb (102 kg) | Fr | Carroll | Fort Wayne, IN |
| F | 15 | Franko House | 6 ft 6 in (1.98 m) | 248 lb (112 kg) | Sr | Concord HS | Elkhart, IN |
| F | 22 | Jermaine Tyler | 6 ft 2 in (1.88 m) | 170 lb (77 kg) | Jr | Arsenal Tech | Indianapolis, IN |
| F | 24 | Zach Hollywood | 6 ft 9 in (2.06 m) | 192 lb (87 kg) | Fr | Bradley-Bourbonnais | Bradley, IL |
| F | 25 | Tahjai Teague | 6 ft 8 in (2.03 m) | 195 lb (88 kg) | RS Fr | Pike | Indianapolis, IN |
| G/F | 33 | Ryan Weber | 6 ft 6 in (1.98 m) | 226 lb (103 kg) | RS Sr | Roncalli HS; Youngstown State | Indianapolis, IN |
| F | 34 | Sean Sellers | 6 ft 6 in (1.98 m) | 208 lb (94 kg) | Jr | Greensburg | Greensburg, IN |
| C | 35 | DouDou Gueye | 6 ft 10 in (2.08 m) | 230 lb (104 kg) | Sr | SEEDS Academy; South Carolina State | Dakar, Sengal |
| F/C | 41 | Trey Moses | 6 ft 9 in (2.06 m) | 245 lb (111 kg) | So | Eastern | Louisville, KY |

Head coach

- James Whitford (Wisconsin)

Assistant coach(es)

- Jason Grunkemeyer (Miami (OH))
- Danny Peters (Ohio State)
- Brian Thornton (Xavier)

Legend

- (C) Team captain
- (S) Suspended
- (I) Ineligible
- (W) Walk-on
- Injured
- Current redshirt

Roster

== Schedule and results ==
| Date time, TV | Rank^{#} | Opponent^{#} | Result | Record | Site (attendance) city, state |
Exhibition
| 11/03/2016*; 7:00 pm | | Indianapolis | W 76–64 | | Worthen Arena (1,119); Muncie, IN |
Non-conference regular season
| 11/11/2016*; 8:00 pm, FSMW | | at Saint Louis; Men Who Speak Up Main Event | W 85–64 | 1–0 | Chaifetz Arena (7,165); St. Louis, MO |
| 11/15/2016*; 7:00 pm, ESPN3 | | Indiana State | L 74–80 | 1–1 | Worthen Arena (3,845); Muncie, IN |
| 11/18/2016*; 9:00 pm, SECN | | at Alabama; Men Who Speak Up Main Event | L 59–77 | 1–2 | Coleman Coliseum (11,665); Tuscaloosa, AL |
| 11/21/2016*; 3:30 pm | | vs. Coppin State; Men Who Speak Up Main Event | W 79–77 | 2–2 | MGM Grand Garden Arena; Paradise, NV |
| 11/23/2016*; 3:30 pm | | vs. Southern Utah; Men Who Speak Up Main Event | W 94–83 | 3–2 | MGM Grand Garden Arena; Paradise, NV |
| 11/27/2016*; 2:30 pm, ESPN3 | | at Valparaiso | L 73–79 | 3–3 | Athletics–Recreation Center (3,166); Valparaiso, IN |
| 11/29/2016*; 7:00 pm, ESPN3 | | IU Kokomo | W 92–52 | 4–3 | Worthen Arena (3,039); Muncie, IN |
| 12/03/2016*; 2:00 pm, ESPN3 | | IUPUI | L 62–73 | 4–4 | Worthen Arena (2,994); Muncie, IN |
| 12/06/2016*; 7:00 pm, ESPN3 | | Bradley | W 80–63 | 5–4 | Worthen Arena (2,477); Muncie, IN |
| 12/10/2016*; 2:00 pm, ESPN3 | | Eastern Kentucky | W 91–86 | 6–4 | Worthen Arena (2,623); Muncie, IN |
| 12/19/2016*; 7:00 pm, ESPN3 | | Longwood | W 61–45 | 7–4 | Worthen Arena (2,115); Muncie, IN |
| 12/22/2016*; 7:00 pm, ESPN3 | | Alabama State | W 73–48 | 8–4 | Worthen Arena (2,543); Muncie, IN |
| 12/29/2016*; 7:00 pm, ESPN3 | | at North Florida | W 73–68 | 9–4 | UNF Arena (1,464); Jacksonville, FL |
MAC regular season
| 01/03/2017; 7:00 PM | | at Kent State | L 90–100 | 9–5 (0–1) | MAC Center (2,153); Kent, OH |
| 01/07/2017; 1:00 PM, ESPN3 | | Bowling Green | L 71–76 | 9–6 (0–2) | Worthen Arena (2,645); Muncie, IN |
| 01/10/2017; 7:00 PM, ESPN3 | | Miami (OH) | W 85–74 | 10–6 (1–2) | Worthen Arena (3,268); Muncie, IN |
| 01/14/2017; 2:00 PM, ESPN3 | | at Buffalo | W 92–77 | 11–6 (2–2) | Alumni Arena (3,007); Amherst, NY |
| 01/17/2017; 7:00 PM, ESPN3 | | Central Michigan | W 98–83 | 12–6 (3–2) | Worthen Arena (3,044); Muncie, IN |
| 01/21/2017; 2:30 PM, ESPN3 | | at Bowling Green | L 74–79 | 12–7 (3–3) | Stroh Center (2,953); Bowling Green, OH |
| 01/24/2017; 9:00 PM, ASN | | at Eastern Michigan | W 88–80 | 13–7 (4–3) | Convocation Center (967); Ypsilanti, MI |
| 01/28/2017; 1:00 PM, ESPN3 | | Western Michigan | W 84–78 | 14–7 (5–3) | Worthen Arena (4,298); Muncie, IN |
| 01/31/2017; 7:00 PM, ESPN3 | | Toledo | W 81–80 | 15–7 (6–3) | Worthen Arena (3,058); Muncie, IN |
| 02/04/2017; 2:00 PM, ESPN3 | | Buffalo | L 69–96 | 15–8 (6–4) | Worthen Arena (3,326); Muncie, IN |
| 02/07/2017; 6:00 PM, ASN | | at Akron | L 63–65 | 15–9 (6–5) | James A. Rhodes Arena (3,105); Akron, OH |
| 02/10/2017; 6:30 PM, CBSSN | | Ohio | L 77–79 | 15–10 (6–6) | Worthen Arena (3,123); Muncie, IN |
| 02/14/2017; 8:00 PM, ASN | | at Northern Illinois | W 81–72 | 16–10 (7–6) | Convocation Center (759); DeKalb, IL |
| 02/18/2017; 4:30 PM, ESPN3 | | at Central Michigan | W 109–100 ^{OT} | 17–10 (8–6) | McGuirk Arena (5,412); Mount Pleasant, MI |
| 02/21/2017; 7:00 PM, ESPN3 | | Eastern Michigan | W 79–72 | 18–10 (9–6) | Worthen Arena (3,088); Muncie, IN |
| 02/25/2017; 2:00 PM, ESPN3 | | at Western Michigan | L 55–80 | 18–11 (9–7) | University Arena (2,857); Kalamazoo, MI |
| 02/28/2017; 7:00 PM, ESPN3 | | at Toledo | L 72–74 | 19–11 (10–7) | Savage Arena (3,958); Toledo, OH |
| 03/03/2017; 7:00 PM, ESPN3 | | Northern Illinois | W 87–82 | 20–11 (11–7) | Worthen Arena (4,457); Muncie, IN |
MAC tournament
| 03/09/2017; 2:30 pm, BCSN/ESPN3 | (4) | vs. (5) Western Michigan; Quarterfinals | W 66–63 | 21–11 | Quicken Loans Arena (2,245); Cleveland, OH |
| 03/10/2017; 5:30 pm, CBSSN | (4) | vs. (1) Akron; Semifinals | L 70–74 | 21–12 | Quicken Loans Arena (6,065); Cleveland, OH |
CIT
| 03/15/2017*; 7:00 pm, Facebook Live | | at Fort Wayne; First Round; Lou Henson Classic | L 80–88 | 21–13 | Gates Sports Center (1,479); Fort Wayne, IN |
*Non-conference game. ^{#}Rankings from AP Poll. (#) Tournament seedings in parentheses. All times are in Eastern Time Source.

== See also ==
- 2016–17 Ball State Cardinals women's basketball team
