= 2016–17 South Dakota State Jackrabbits men's basketball team =

American college basketball season

2016–17 South Dakota State Jackrabbits men's basketball

Summit League tournament champions

NCAA tournament, First Round
- Conference: Summit League
- Record: 18–17 (8–8 The Summit)
- Head coach: T. J. Otzelberger (1st season)
- Assistant coaches: Eric Henderson; Rob Klinkefus; Ben Walker
- Home arena: Frost Arena

2016–17 Summit League men's basketball standings
	Conf.				Overall
Team	W		L	PCT	W		L	PCT
South Dakota	12	–	4	.750	22	–	12	.647
North Dakota State	11	–	5	.688	19	–	11	.633
Omaha	9	–	7	.563	18	–	14	.563
Fort Wayne	8	–	8	.500	20	–	13	.606
Denver	8	–	8	.500	16	–	14	.533
South Dakota State †	8	–	8	.500	18	–	17	.514
IUPUI	7	–	9	.438	14	–	18	.438
Western Illinois	5	–	11	.313	8	–	20	.286
Oral Roberts	4	–	12	.250	8	–	22	.267
† 2017 Summit League Tournament winner

The 2016–17 South Dakota State Jackrabbits men's basketball team represented South Dakota State University during the 2016–17 NCAA Division I men's basketball season. The Jackrabbits, led by first-year head coach T. J. Otzelberger, played their home games at Frost Arena in Brookings, South Dakota as members of the Summit League. They finished the season 18–17, 8–8 in Summit League play to finish in a three-way tie for fourth place. As the No. 4 seed in the Summit League tournament, they defeated Denver, South Dakota, and Omaha to win the tournament championship. As a result, they earned the league's automatic bid to the NCAA tournament. As the No. 16 seed in the West region, they lost in the first round to Gonzaga.

== Previous season ==
The Jackrabbits finished the 2015–16 season 26–8, 12–4 in Summit League play to share the Summit League regular season championship. They defeated Oral Roberts, Denver, and North Dakota State to win the Summit League tournament. As a result, they received the conference's automatic bid to the NCAA tournament. As a No. 12 seed in the South Region, they were eliminated by No. 5-seeded Maryland in the first round.

On April 4, head coach Scott Nagy resigned to become the head coach at Wright State. On April 13, the school hired T. J. Otzelberger as head coach.

== Roster ==
2016–17 South Dakota State Jackrabbits men's basketball team
Players
Coaches

Pos.	#	Name	Height	Weight	Year	Hometown
G	1	Skyler Flatten	6 ft 5 in (1.96 m)	195 lb (88 kg)	RS Jr	Clark, South Dakota
G	2	Tevin King	6 ft 2 in (1.88 m)	195 lb (88 kg)	So	Chicago, Illinois
G	3	Chris Howell	6 ft 5 in (1.96 m)	195 lb (88 kg)	So	Milwaukee, Wisconsin
G	4	Sergio El Darwich	6 ft 4 in (1.93 m)	195 lb (88 kg)	Fr	Lebanon
G	5	Beau Brown	6 ft 1 in (1.85 m)	175 lb (79 kg)	RS Fr	Mitchell, South Dakota
G	10	Cole Gentry	5 ft 10 in (1.78 m)	175 lb (79 kg)	RS Fr	St. Charles, Illinois
G	20	Andre Wallace	6 ft 1 in (1.85 m)	200 lb (91 kg)	Jr	Minneapolis, Minnesota
G/F	23	Reed Tellinghuisen	6 ft 7 in (2.01 m)	195 lb (88 kg)	Jr	Sac City, Iowa
F	24	Mike Daum	6 ft 9 in (2.06 m)	245 lb (111 kg)	RS So	Kimball, Nebraska
G/F	25	Lane Severyn	6 ft 5 in (1.96 m)	215 lb (98 kg)	RS Jr	Pierre, South Dakota
F	32	Adam Dykman	6 ft 7 in (2.01 m)	225 lb (102 kg)	RS Fr	Fremont, Nebraska
G/F	35	A. J. Hess	6 ft 7 in (2.01 m)	200 lb (91 kg)	Sr	Carefree, Arizona
F	42	Ian Theisen	6 ft 9 in (2.06 m)	250 lb (113 kg)	Jr	Osseo, Minnesota
G	50	Michael Orris	6 ft 3 in (1.91 m)	195 lb (88 kg)	Sr	Crete, Illinois

Head coach

- T. J. Otzelberger (UW–Whitewater)

Assistant coach(es)

- Rob Klinkefus (Buena Vista)
- Eric Henderson (Wayne State (NE))
- Ben Walker (Creighton)

Legend

- (C) Team captain
- (S) Suspended
- (I) Ineligible
- (W) Walk-on
- Injured
- Current redshirt

Roster
Last update: 2016-08-03

== Schedule and results ==
Date time, TV	Rank^{#}	Opponent^{#}	Result	Record	Site (attendance) city, state
Exhibition
11/03/2016; 8:30 pm		South Dakota Mines	W 85–64		Frost Arena (2,253); Brookings, SD
Non-conference regular season
11/11/2016*; 9:00 pm, P12N		at California	L 53–82	0–1	Haas Pavilion (7,782); Berkeley, CA
11/14/2016*; 9:00 pm		at UC Irvine	L 58–73	0–2	Bren Events Center (1,172); Irvine, CA
11/16/2016*; 7:00 pm		Wayne State (NE)	W 80–72	1–2	Frost Arena (1,749); Brookings, SD
11/19/2016*; 8:00 pm		at Wyoming	L 67–77	1–3	Arena-Auditorium (6,833); Laramie, WY
11/21/2016*; 9:00 pm		at Idaho	L 89–96 ^{OT}	1–4	Memorial Gym (474); Moscow, ID
11/25/2016*; 8:00 pm		vs. UC Irvine; Sanford Pentagon Showcase	L 52–63	1–5	Sanford Pentagon (1,826); Sioux Falls, SD
11/26/2016*; 4:30 pm		vs. East Tennessee State; Sanford Pentagon Showcase	L 59–71	1–6	Sanford Pentagon (1,688); Sioux Falls, SD
11/27/2016*; 2:30 pm		vs. Milwaukee; Sanford Pentagon Showcase	W 81–58	2–6	Sanford Pentagon (1,346); Sioux Falls, SD
11/30/2016*; 7:00 pm		UM–Crookston	W 90–58	3–6	Frost Arena (1,669); Brookings, SD
12/03/2016*; 11:00 am		UMKC	W 77–68	4–6	Frost Arena (1,424); Brookings, SD
12/07/2016*; 7:00 pm, ESPN3		Northern Iowa	L 58–86	4–7	McLeod Center (3,922); Cedar Falls, IA
12/10/2016*; 7:00 pm		Idaho	W 80–77	5–7	Frost Arena (1,349); Brookings, SD
12/17/2016*; 4:00 pm		Murray State	W 88–84 ^{OT}	6–7	Frost Arena (1,081); Brookings, SD
12/19/2016*; 7:00 pm, ESPN3		at Drake	W 83–75	7–7	Knapp Center (2,385); Des Moines, IA
12/22/2016*; 7:00 pm, ESPN3		at Wichita State	L 67–89	7–8	Charles Koch Arena (10,506); Wichita, KS
Summit League regular season
12/28/2016; 7:00 pm		North Dakota State	L 69–80	7–9 (0–1)	Frost Arena (2,854); Brookings, SD
12/31/2016; 1:00 pm		South Dakota	W 73–72	8–9 (1–1)	Frost Arena (2,518); Brookings, SD
01/04/2017; 7:00 pm		at Western Illinois	L 74–82	8–10 (1–2)	Western Hall (783); Macomb, IL
01/07/2017; 4:30 pm		Omaha	L 93–101	8–11 (1–3)	Frost Arena (2,230); Brookings, SD
01/12/2017; 7:00 pm		at Oral Roberts	L 88–94	8–12 (1–4)	Mabee Center (2,812); Tulsa, OK
01/18/2017; 6:00 pm		at IUPUI	L 83–85	8–13 (1–5)	Indiana Farmers Coliseum (981); Indianapolis, IN
01/21/2017; 4:30 pm		Fort Wayne	L 67–77	9–13 (2–5)	Frost Arena (3,203); Brookings, SD
01/25/2017; 8:00 pm		at Denver	L 82–91	9–14 (2–6)	Magness Arena (1,171); Denver, CO
01/28/2017; 7:00 pm		at Omaha	W 88–84	10–14 (3–6)	Baxter Arena (3,038); Omaha, NE
02/01/2017; 7:00 pm		Western Illinois	W 98–65	11–14 (4–6)	Frost Arena (2,017); Brookings, SD
02/04/2017; 4:30 pm		Oral Roberts	W 74–67	12–14 (5–6)	Frost Arena (3,917); Brookings, SD
02/08/2017; 8:00 pm		at North Dakota State	L 65–82	12–15 (5–7)	Scheels Center (4,805); Fargo, ND
02/11/2017; 1:00 pm		at South Dakota	L 89–91	12–16 (5–8)	Sanford Coyote Sports Center (5,265); Vermillion, SD
02/15/2017; 7:00 pm		IUPUI	W 81–67	13–16 (6–8)	Frost Arena (2,333); Brookings, SD
02/18/2017; 6:00 pm		at Fort Wayne	W 97–89	14–16 (7–8)	Gates Sports Center (1,521); Fort Wayne, IN
02/25/2017; 4:00 pm		Denver	W 88–64	15–16 (8–8)	Frost Arena (3,829); Brookings, SD
Summit League tournament
03/05/2017; 6:00 pm, ESPN3	(4)	vs. (5) Denver; Quarterfinals	W 83–73	16–16	Premier Center (9,837); Sioux Falls, SD
03/06/2017; 6:00 pm, ESPN3	(4)	vs. (1) South Dakota; Semifinals	W 74–71	17–16	Premier Center (11,235); Sioux Falls, SD
03/07/2017; 8:00 pm, ESPN2	(4)	vs. (3) Omaha; Championship	W 79–77	18–16	Premier Center (9,441); Sioux Falls, SD
NCAA tournament
03/16/2017*; 2:00 pm, TBS	(16 W)	vs. (1 W) No. 2 Gonzaga; First Round	L 46–66	18–17	Vivint Smart Home Arena (16,952); Salt Lake City, UT
*Non-conference game. ^{#}Rankings from AP Poll. (#) Tournament seedings in parentheses. W=West Region. All times are in Central Time Source.
