= 2017 Summit League men's basketball tournament =

- Classification: Division I
- Season: 2016–17
- Teams: 8
- Site: Denny Sanford Premier Center; Sioux Falls, South Dakota
- Champions: South Dakota State (4th title)
- Winning coach: T. J. Otzelberger (1st title)
- MVP: Mike Daum (South Dakota State)
- Television: Midco Sport Network; ESPN2

2016–17 Summit League men's basketball standings
| | Conf. | | | | Overall |
| Team | W | | L | PCT | W | | L | PCT |
|---|---|---|---|---|---|---|---|---|
| South Dakota | 12 | – | 4 | .750 | 22 | – | 12 | .647 |
| North Dakota State | 11 | – | 5 | .688 | 19 | – | 11 | .633 |
| Omaha | 9 | – | 7 | .563 | 18 | – | 14 | .563 |
| Fort Wayne | 8 | – | 8 | .500 | 20 | – | 13 | .606 |
| Denver | 8 | – | 8 | .500 | 16 | – | 14 | .533 |
| South Dakota State † | 8 | – | 8 | .500 | 18 | – | 17 | .514 |
| IUPUI | 7 | – | 9 | .438 | 14 | – | 18 | .438 |
| Western Illinois | 5 | – | 11 | .313 | 8 | – | 20 | .286 |
| Oral Roberts | 4 | – | 12 | .250 | 8 | – | 22 | .267 |
† 2017 Summit League Tournament winner

The 2017 Summit League men's basketball tournament was the post-season men's basketball tournament for the Summit League. The tournament was held from March 4–7, 2017 at the Denny Sanford Premier Center in Sioux Falls, South Dakota. The winners of the tournament, South Dakota State, received an automatic bid to the 2017 NCAA tournament with a 79–77 win over Omaha in the finals. This was South Dakota State's fourth championship in six years.

== Seeds ==
The top 8 teams in the final standings qualified for the tournament.

Teams were seeded by record within the conference, with a tiebreaker system to seed teams with identical conference records.

| Seed | School | Conference | Tiebreaker #1 |
|---|---|---|---|
| 1 | South Dakota | 12–4 | |
| 2 | North Dakota State | 11–5 | |
| 3 | Omaha | 9–7 | |
| 4 | South Dakota State | 8–8 | 3–1 vs DEN/FW |
| 5 | Denver | 8–8 | 2–2 vs SDSU/FW |
| 6 | Fort Wayne | 8–8 | 1–3 vs DEN/SDSU |
| 7 | IUPUI | 7–9 | |
| 8 | Western Illinois | 5–11 | |

== Schedule ==
| Session | Game | Time* | Matchup | Score | Television |
Quarterfinals – Saturday March 4, 2017
| 1 | 1 | 6:00 pm | No. 1 South Dakota vs. No. 8 Western Illinois | 78–69 | Midco Sport Network; ESPN3 |
| 1 | 2 | 8:30 pm | No. 2 North Dakota State vs. No. 7 IUPUI | 57–76 | Midco Sport Network; ESPN3 |
Quarterfinals – Sunday March 5, 2017
| 2 | 3 | 6:00 pm | No. 4 South Dakota State vs. No. 5 Denver | 83–73 | Midco Sport Network; ESPN3 |
| 2 | 4 | 8:30 pm | No. 3 Omaha vs. No. 6 Fort Wayne | 84–80 | Midco Sport Network; ESPN3 |
Semifinals – Monday March 6, 2017
| 3 | 5 | 6:00 pm | No. 1 South Dakota vs No. 4 South Dakota State | 71–74 | Midco Sport Network; ESPN3 |
| 3 | 6 | 8:30 pm | No. 7 IUPUI vs No. 3 Omaha | 62–90 | Midco Sport Network; ESPN3 |
Final – Tuesday March 7, 2017
| 4 | 7 | 8:00 pm | No. 4 South Dakota State vs No. 3 Omaha | 79–77 | ESPN2 |
*Game times in CT. Rankings denote tournament seed

== Bracket ==
Quarterfinals; Saturday/Sunday March 4–5; Midco Sport Network
1 | South Dakota | 78*
8 | Western Illinois | 69
4 | South Dakota State | 83
5 | Denver | 73
2 | North Dakota State | 57
7 | IUPUI | 76
3 | Omaha | 84
6 | Fort Wayne | 80

Semifinals; Monday March 6 Midco Sport Network
1 | South Dakota | 71
4 | South Dakota State | 74
7 | IUPUI | 62
3 | Omaha | 90

Final; Tuesday March 7 ESPN2
4 | South Dakota State | 79
3 | Omaha | 77

* denotes overtime period
