= 2016–17 North Dakota State Bison men's basketball team =

American college basketball season

2016–17 North Dakota State Bison men's basketball
- Conference: Summit League
- Record: 19–11 (11–5 The Summit)
- Head coach: David Richman (3rd season)
- Assistant coaches: Jayden Olson; Kyan Brown; Will Veasley
- Home arena: Scheels Center

2016–17 Summit League men's basketball standings
	Conf.				Overall
Team	W		L	PCT	W		L	PCT
South Dakota	12	–	4	.750	22	–	12	.647
North Dakota State	11	–	5	.688	19	–	11	.633
Omaha	9	–	7	.563	18	–	14	.563
Fort Wayne	8	–	8	.500	20	–	13	.606
Denver	8	–	8	.500	16	–	14	.533
South Dakota State †	8	–	8	.500	18	–	17	.514
IUPUI	7	–	9	.438	14	–	18	.438
Western Illinois	5	–	11	.313	8	–	20	.286
Oral Roberts	4	–	12	.250	8	–	22	.267
† 2017 Summit League Tournament winner

The 2016–17 North Dakota State Bison men's basketball team represented North Dakota State University in the 2016–17 NCAA Division I men's basketball season. The Bison, led by third-year head coach David Richman, played their home games at the Scheels Center in Fargo, North Dakota and were members of The Summit League. They finished the season 19–11, 11–5 in Summit League play to finish in second place. They were upset by IUPUI in the quarterfinals of the Summit League tournament.

== Previous season ==
The Bison finished the 2015–16 season 20–13, 8–8 in Summit League play to finish in fifth place. They defeated IUPUI and IPFW to advance to the championship game of The Summit League tournament where they lost to South Dakota State. Despite having 20 wins, they did not participate in a postseason tournament.

== Roster ==
2016–17 North Dakota State Bison men's basketball team
Players
Coaches

Pos.	#	Name	Height	Weight	Year	Hometown
G	2	Paul Miller	6 ft 6 in (1.98 m)	200 lb (91 kg)	Jr	Waukesha, Wisconsin
G	3	Carlin Dupree	6 ft 3 in (1.91 m)	190 lb (86 kg)	Sr	Milwaukee, Wisconsin
G	4	Malik Clements	6 ft 3 in (1.91 m)	215 lb (98 kg)	Jr	Madison, Wisconsin
G	11	Jared Samuelson	6 ft 3 in (1.91 m)	180 lb (82 kg)	Fr	Gretna, Nebraska
G	12	Zach Rammelt	6 ft 2 in (1.88 m)	195 lb (88 kg)	RS Fr	Racine, Wisconsin
G	13	Khy Kabellis	6 ft 5 in (1.96 m)	185 lb (84 kg)	So	Escondido, California
G/F	21	A.J. Jacobson	6 ft 6 in (1.98 m)	210 lb (95 kg)	Jr	Fargo, North Dakota
G	22	Cameron Hunter	6 ft 3 in (1.91 m)	175 lb (79 kg)	Fr	Olathe, Kansas
F	23	Deng Geu	6 ft 8 in (2.03 m)	210 lb (95 kg)	RS Fr	Sioux Falls, South Dakota
G	24	Tyson Ward	6 ft 6 in (1.98 m)	175 lb (79 kg)	Fr	Tampa, Florida
G	25	Blaze Irwin	6 ft 6 in (1.98 m)	190 lb (86 kg)	RS Fr	Wahpeton, North Dakota
F	30	Spencer Eliason	6 ft 9 in (2.06 m)	240 lb (109 kg)	So	Chadron, Nebraska
F	32	Evan Wesenberg	6 ft 6 in (1.98 m)	215 lb (98 kg)	So	Germantown, Wisconsin
F	40	Dexter Werner	6 ft 6 in (1.98 m)	240 lb (109 kg)	Sr	Bismarck, North Dakota
F	42	Dylan Miller	6 ft 8 in (2.03 m)	240 lb (109 kg)	So	Panama, Illinois

Head coach

- David Richman (North Dakota State)

Assistant coach(es)

- Jayden Olson (Dickinson State)
- Kyan Brown (Oral Roberts)
- Will Veasley (Butler)

Legend

- (C) Team captain
- (S) Suspended
- (I) Ineligible
- (W) Walk-on
- Injured
- Current redshirt

Roster

== Schedule and results ==
Date time, TV	Rank^{#}	Opponent^{#}	Result	Record	Site (attendance) city, state
Exhibition
11/02/2016*; 7:00 pm		Concordia Moorhead	W 90–53		Scheels Center (2,588); Fargo, ND
Non-conference regular season
11/11/2016*; 7:00 pm		Arkansas State	W 76–66	1–0	Scheels Center (5,005); Fargo, ND
11/13/2016*; 5:00 pm, ESPN3		Minnesota Morris	W 92–62	2–0	Scheels Center (1,723); Fargo, ND
11/18/2016*; 3:00 pm		vs. Navy; High Point Tournament	W 66–59	3–0	Millis Center (1,750); High Point, NC
11/19/2016*; 6:00 pm		vs. UNC Greensboro; High Point Tournament	L 54–65	3–1	Millis Center (1,750); High Point, NC
11/20/2016*; 11:30 am		at High Point; High Point Tournament	W 70–44	4–1	Millis Center (1,750); High Point, NC
11/22/2016*; 8:00 pm, ESPN3		Waldorf	W 83–52	5–1	Scheels Center (1,845); Fargo, ND
11/27/2016*; 3:00 pm, ESPN3		at Missouri State	L 50–64	5–2	JQH Arena (3,765); Springfield, MO
11/29/2016*; 5:30 pm, FS1		at No. 7 Xavier	L 55–85	5–3	Cintas Center (10,250); Cincinnati, OH
12/02/2016*; 6:00 pm		at North Carolina A&T	W 85–67	6–3	Corbett Sports Center (747); Greensboro, NC
12/07/2016*; 7:00 pm, ESPN3		North Dakota	L 56–74	6–4	Scheels Center (5,022); Fargo, ND
12/14/2016*; 7:00 pm, ESPN3		UC Davis	W 74–70	7–4	Scheels Center (2,921); Fargo, ND
12/16/2016*; 7:00 pm, ESPN3		at North Dakota	W 87–70	8–4	Betty Engelstad Sioux Center (2,428); Grand Forks, ND
12/20/2016*; 7:00 pm, SECN		at Arkansas	L 55–71	8–5	Bud Walton Arena (16,006); Fayetteville, AR
Summit League regular season
12/28/2016; 7:00 pm, ESPN3		at South Dakota State	W 80–69	9–5 (1–0)	Frost Arena (2,854); Brookings, SD
12/31/2016; 2:00 pm		Omaha	W 82–70	10–5 (2–0)	Scheels Center (3,176); Fargo, ND
01/05/2017; 7:00 pm, ESPN3		IUPUI	W 93–89	11–5 (3–0)	Scheels Center (2,728); Fargo, ND
01/11/2017; 7:00 pm, ESPN3		at South Dakota	W 70–69	12–5 (4–0)	Sanford Coyote Sports Center (2,582); Vermillion, SD
01/14/2017; 5:00 pm, ALT2		at Denver	L 55–79	12–6 (4–1)	Magness Arena (2,641); Denver, CO
01/19/2017; 7:00 pm, ESPN3		Fort Wayne	W 89–83	13–6 (5–1)	Scheels Center (4,210); Fargo, ND
01/21/2017; 2:00 pm, ESPN3		at Western Illinois	W 89–57	14–6 (6–1)	Western Hall (883); Macomb, IL
01/25/2017; 7:00 pm, ESPN3		Oral Roberts	W 81–71	15–6 (7–1)	Scheels Center (4,353); Fargo, ND
02/01/2017; 6:00 pm, ESPN3		at IUPUI	L 81–86 ^{OT}	15–7 (7–2)	Indiana Farmers Coliseum (1,098); Indianapolis, IN
02/04/2017; 2:00 pm, ESPN3		South Dakota	L 66–76	15–8 (7–3)	Scheels Center (5,007); Fargo, ND
02/08/2017; 8:00 pm, ESPN3		South Dakota State	W 82–65	16–8 (8–3)	Scheels Center (4,805); Fargo, ND
02/11/2017; 2:00 pm, ESPN3		Denver	W 81–63	17–8 (9–3)	Scheels Center (4,433); Fargo, ND
02/15/2017; 6:00 pm		at Fort Wayne	L 61–77	17–9 (9–4)	Memorial Coliseum (1,733); Fort Wayne, IN
02/18/2017; 4:00 pm, ESPN3		Western Illinois	W 100–91 ^{2OT}	18–9 (10–4)	Scheels Center (4,696); Fargo, ND
02/22/2017; 7:00 pm, ESPN3		at Oral Roberts	W 82–80	19–9 (11–4)	Mabee Center (3,182); Tulsa, OK
02/25/2017; 7:00 pm		at Omaha	L 92–96	19–10 (11–5)	Baxter Arena (3,238); Omaha, NE
The Summit League tournament
03/04/2017; 8:30 pm, ESPN3	(2)	vs. (7) IUPUI; Quarterfinals	L 57–76	19–11	Premier Center (9,399); Sioux Falls, SD
*Non-conference game. ^{#}Rankings from AP Poll. (#) Tournament seedings in parentheses. All times are in Central Time.
