= 2016–17 Denver Pioneers men's basketball team =

American college basketball season

2016–17 Denver Pioneers men's basketball
- Conference: The Summit League
- Record: 16–14 (8–8 The Summit)
- Head coach: Rodney Billups (1st season)
- Assistant coaches: Ricardo Patton; Steve Snell; Dan Ficke
- Home arena: Magness Arena

2016–17 Summit League men's basketball standings
| | Conf. | | | | Overall |
| Team | W | | L | PCT | W | | L | PCT |
|---|---|---|---|---|---|---|---|---|
| South Dakota | 12 | – | 4 | .750 | 22 | – | 12 | .647 |
| North Dakota State | 11 | – | 5 | .688 | 19 | – | 11 | .633 |
| Omaha | 9 | – | 7 | .563 | 18 | – | 14 | .563 |
| Fort Wayne | 8 | – | 8 | .500 | 20 | – | 13 | .606 |
| Denver | 8 | – | 8 | .500 | 16 | – | 14 | .533 |
| South Dakota State † | 8 | – | 8 | .500 | 18 | – | 17 | .514 |
| IUPUI | 7 | – | 9 | .438 | 14 | – | 18 | .438 |
| Western Illinois | 5 | – | 11 | .313 | 8 | – | 20 | .286 |
| Oral Roberts | 4 | – | 12 | .250 | 8 | – | 22 | .267 |
† 2017 Summit League Tournament winner

The 2016–17 Denver Pioneers men's basketball team represented the University of Denver during the 2016–17 NCAA Division I men's basketball season. The Pioneers, led by first-year head coach Rodney Billups, played their home games at Magness Arena and were members of The Summit League. They finished the season 16–14, 8–8 in Summit League play to finish in a three-way tie for fourth place. They lost in the quarterfinals of the Summit League tournament to South Dakota State.

== Previous season ==
The Pioneers finished the 2015–16 season 16–15, 7–9 in Summit League play to finish in sixth place. They defeated Nebraska–Omaha in the quarterfinals of The Summit League tournament to advance to the semifinals where they lost to South Dakota State.

On March 11, head coach Joe Scott was fired. He finished at Denver with a nine-year record of 146–132. On March 14, the school hired Rodney Billups as head coach.

== Roster ==
2016–17 Denver Pioneers men's basketball team
Players
Coaches

| Pos. | # | Name | Height | Weight | Year | Hometown |
|---|---|---|---|---|---|---|
| G | 0 | Ade Murkey | 6 ft 5 in (1.96 m) | 200 lb (91 kg) | Fr | Minneapolis, Minnesota |
| G | 2 | Joe Rosga | 6 ft 3 in (1.91 m) | 175 lb (79 kg) | So | St. Paul, Minnesota |
| G | 3 | Bradley George | 6 ft 3 in (1.91 m) | 185 lb (84 kg) | So | Houston, Texas |
| G | 4 | Jacob Lunsford | 6 ft 1 in (1.85 m) | 175 lb (79 kg) | So | Clayton, California |
| G | 5 | Jake Pemberton | 6 ft 4 in (1.93 m) | 190 lb (86 kg) | Jr | Highlands Ranch, Colorado |
| G | 10 | Jake Holtzmann | 6 ft 6 in (1.98 m) | 195 lb (88 kg) | So | Parker, Colorado |
| F | 11 | Jake Krafka | 6 ft 7 in (2.01 m) | 215 lb (98 kg) | Fr | Austin, Texas |
| G | 12 | Luke Neff | 6 ft 0 in (1.83 m) | 155 lb (70 kg) | Fr | Arvada, Colorado |
| F | 13 | C.J. Bobbitt | 6 ft 7 in (2.01 m) | 225 lb (102 kg) | So | Harker Heights, Texas |
| G | 14 | Duke Douglas | 6 ft 4 in (1.93 m) | 190 lb (86 kg) | RS Jr | New Orleans, Louisiana |
| G | 15 | Thomas Neff | 6 ft 5 in (1.96 m) | 200 lb (91 kg) | So | Arvada, Colorado |
| G | 22 | Josiah Dunn | 6 ft 2 in (1.88 m) | 185 lb (84 kg) | Sr | Littleton, Colorado |
| C | 24 | Christian Mackey | 6 ft 6 in (1.98 m) | 275 lb (125 kg) | Jr | Kirtland, New Mexico |
| F | 25 | Emil Knighton | 6 ft 7 in (2.01 m) | 220 lb (100 kg) | So | Parker, Colorado |
| F | 32 | Abiola Akintola | 6 ft 6 in (1.98 m) | 220 lb (100 kg) | So | Melbourne, Australia |
| C | 44 | Daniel Amigo | 6 ft 10 in (2.08 m) | 245 lb (111 kg) | Jr | El Paso, Texas |

Head coach

- Rodney Billups (Denver)

Assistant coach(es)

- Ricardo Patton (Belmont)
- Steve Snell (Radford)
- Dan Ficke (Loyola (MD))

Legend

- (C) Team captain
- (S) Suspended
- (I) Ineligible
- (W) Walk-on
- Injured
- Current redshirt

Roster

== Schedule and results ==
| Date time, TV | Rank^{#} | Opponent^{#} | Result | Record | Site (attendance) city, state |
Non-conference regular season
| Nov 12, 2016*; 7:00 pm, ALT2 | | Jacksonville | L 84–92 | 0–1 | Magness Arena (2,030); Denver, CO |
| Nov 17, 2016*; 8:00 pm | | at San Jose State | W 74–69 | 1–1 | Event Center Arena; San Jose, CA |
| Nov 23, 2016*; 7:00 pm | | Utah Valley | L 85–88 | 1–2 | Magness Arena (1,377); Denver, CO |
| Nov 26, 2016*; 7:05 pm | | at Eastern Washington; EWU Men's Basketball Classic | L 80–85 ^{OT} | 1–3 | Reese Court (1,026); Cheney, WA |
| Nov 27, 2016*; 1:05 pm | | vs. Sacramento State; EWU Men's Basketball Classic | W 72–61 | 2–3 | Reese Court (300); Cheney, WA |
| Nov 30, 2016*; 7:00 pm | | at Wyoming | L 70–82 | 2–4 | Arena-Auditorium (4,106); Laramie, WY |
| Dec 3, 2016*; 7:00 pm | | at Weber State | W 57–55 | 3–4 | Dee Events Center (6,167); Ogden, UT |
| Dec 7, 2016*; 6:00 pm | | at Texas A&M | L 58–80 | 3–5 | Reed Arena (6,306); College Station, TX |
| Dec 10, 2016*; 1:00 pm | | at Air Force | W 77–65 | 4–5 | Clune Arena (1,852); Colorado Springs, CO |
| Dec 13, 2016*; 6:00 pm | | at South Alabama | W 64–51 | 5–5 | Mitchell Center (1,654); Mobile, AL |
| Dec 17, 2016*; 1:00 pm, ALT2 | | Northern Colorado | W 73–70 | 6–5 | Magness Arena (3,421); Denver, CO |
| Dec 19, 2016*; 7:00 pm | | Arkansas–Pine Bluff | W 74–52 | 7–5 | Magness Arena (954); Denver, CO |
| Dec 22, 2016*; 7:00 pm, ALT2 | | UC Riverside | W 73–55 | 8–5 | Magness Arena (1,149); Denver, CO |
The Summit League regular season
| Dec 28, 2016; 7:00 pm, ALT2 | | Oral Roberts | W 77–73 | 9–5 (1–0) | Magness Arena (1,347); Denver, CO |
| Jan 4, 2017; 7:00 pm, ALT2 | | South Dakota | L 69–75 | 9–6 (1–1) | Magness Arena (1,115); Denver, CO |
| Jan 4, 2017; 5:00 pm | | at Fort Wayne | L 83–87 | 9–7 (1–2) | Gates Sports Center (1,164); Fort Wayne, IN |
| Jan 11, 2017; 7:00 pm, ALT | | Western Illinois | W 84–70 | 10–7 (2–2) | Magness Arena (1,067); Denver, CO |
| Jan 14, 2017; 4:00 pm, ALT2 | | North Dakota State | W 79–55 | 11–7 (3–2) | Magness Arena (2,641); Denver, CO |
| Jan 19, 2017; 6:00 pm | | at Omaha | L 88–97 | 11–8 (3–3) | Baxter Arena (1,504); Omaha, NE |
| Jan 21, 2017; 11:00 am | | at IUPUI | W 78–74 | 12–8 (4–3) | Indiana Farmers Coliseum (1,078); Indianapolis, IN |
| Jan 25, 2017; 7:00 pm, ALT2 | | South Dakota State | L 81–82 | 13–8 (5–3) | Magness Arena (1,171); Denver, CO |
| Jan 28, 2017; 12:00 pm | | at South Dakota | L 83–88 | 13–9 (5–4) | Sanford Coyote Sports Center (2,436); Vermillion, SD |
| Jan 31, 2017; 6:00 pm | | at Oral Roberts | W 93–69 | 14–9 (6–4) | Mabee Center (2,464); Tulsa, OK |
| Feb 4, 2017; 4:00 pm | | Fort Wayne | W 76–73 ^{OT} | 15–9 (7–4) | Magness Arena (1,656); Denver, CO |
| Feb 11, 2017; 1:00 pm | | at North Dakota State | L 63–81 | 15–10 (7–5) | Scheels Center (4,433); Fargo, ND |
| Feb 14, 2017; 6:00 pm, ESPN3 | | at Western Illinois | W 78–72 | 16–10 (8–5) | Western Hall (804); Macomb, IL |
| Feb 19, 2017; 1:30 pm, ALT | | IUPUI | L 72–83 | 16–11 (8–6) | Magness Arena (1,612); Denver, CO |
| Feb 22, 2017; 7:00 pm, ALT | | Omaha | L 83–84 | 16–12 (8–7) | Magness Arena (1,642); Denver, CO |
| Feb 25, 2017; 3:00 pm | | at South Dakota State | L 64–88 | 16–13 (8–8) | Frost Arena (3,829); Brookings, SD |
The Summit League tournament
| Mar 5, 2017; 5:00 pm, ESPN3 | (5) | vs. (4) South Dakota State; Quarterfinals | L 73–83 | 16–14 | Premier Center (9,837); Sioux Falls, SD |
*Non-conference game. ^{#}Rankings from AP Poll. (#) Tournament seedings in parentheses. All times are in Mountain Time.
