= 2016–17 IUPUI Jaguars men's basketball team =

American college basketball season

2016–17 IUPUI Jaguars men's basketball
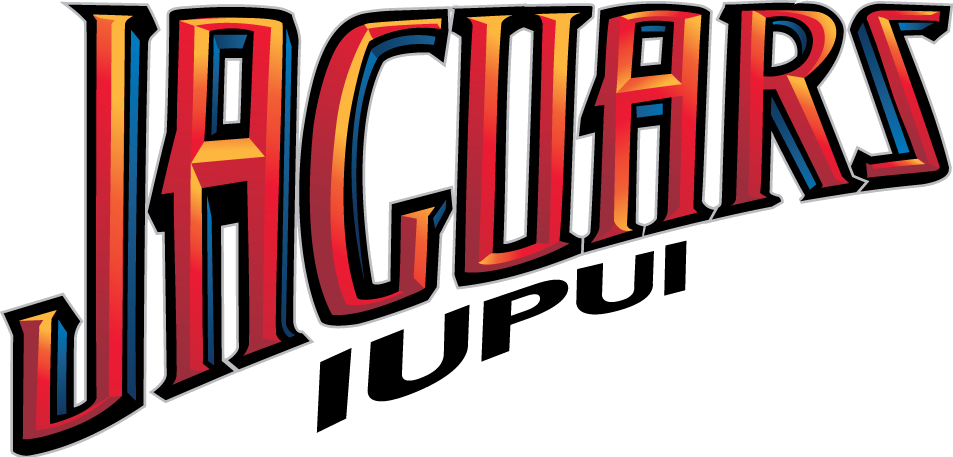
- Conference: The Summit League
- Record: 14–18 (7–9 The Summit)
- Head coach: Jason Gardner (3rd season)
- Assistant coaches: Matt Crenshaw; Scott Gillespie; Roy Hairston
- Home arena: Indiana Farmers Coliseum

2016–17 Summit League men's basketball standings
	Conf.				Overall
Team	W		L	PCT	W		L	PCT
South Dakota	12	–	4	.750	22	–	12	.647
North Dakota State	11	–	5	.688	19	–	11	.633
Omaha	9	–	7	.563	18	–	14	.563
Fort Wayne	8	–	8	.500	20	–	13	.606
Denver	8	–	8	.500	16	–	14	.533
South Dakota State †	8	–	8	.500	18	–	17	.514
IUPUI	7	–	9	.438	14	–	18	.438
Western Illinois	5	–	11	.313	8	–	20	.286
Oral Roberts	4	–	12	.250	8	–	22	.267
† 2017 Summit League Tournament winner

The 2016–17 IUPUI Jaguars men's basketball team represented Indiana University – Purdue University Indianapolis during the 2016–17 NCAA Division I men's basketball season. The Jaguars, led by third-year head coach Jason Gardner, played their home games at Indiana Farmers Coliseum in Indianapolis, Indiana as members of The Summit League. They finished the season 14–18, 7–9 in Summit League play to finish in seventh place. They defeated North Dakota State in the quarterfinals of The Summit League tournament to advance to the semifinals where they lost to Omaha.

This was the Jaguars' final season as a member of the Summit League as the school announced on June 28, 2017, that it would be joining the Horizon League effective July 1, 2017.

== Previous season ==
The Jaguars finished the 2015–16 season 13–19, 9–7 in Summit League play to finish in fourth place. They lost to North Dakota State in the quarterfinals of The Summit League tournament.

== Roster ==
2016–17 IUPUI Jaguars men's basketball team
Players
Coaches

Pos.	#	Name	Height	Weight	Year	Previous school	Hometown
G	0	Darell Combs	6 ft 2 in (1.88 m)	195 lb (88 kg)	RS Sr	Thornwood (Eastern Michigan)	Chicago, IL
G	1	T.J. Henderson	6 ft 0 in (1.83 m)	160 lb (73 kg)	So	Scecina	Indianapolis, IN
G	2	Anthony Jones	6 ft 5 in (1.96 m)	210 lb (95 kg)	RS Fr	Speedway	Indianapolis, IN
G	5	Kellon Thomas	5 ft 11 in (1.8 m)	190 lb (86 kg)	RS Sr	Southport (Kent State)	Indianapolis, IN
G	10	Nick Rogers (redshirt)	6 ft 1 in (1.85 m)	170 lb (77 kg)	RS So	Traders Point Academy (Toledo)	Indianapolis, IN
F/C	11	Josh James	6 ft 9 in (2.06 m)	225 lb (102 kg)	Jr	Andrean (Quakerdale Prep)	Cedar Lake, IN
	12	Chad Hudson	5 ft 11 in (1.8 m)	175 lb (79 kg)	Fr	Jeffersonville (Don Bosco Prep)	Jeffersonville, IN
F	15	Matt O'Leary	6 ft 8 in (2.03 m)	225 lb (102 kg)	RS Sr	Terre Haute North Vigo (Loyola)	Terre Haute, IN
G	20	Grant Sinn	6 ft 2 in (1.88 m)	180 lb (82 kg)	RS Fr	Canterbury (North Park)	Spencerville, IN
G	22	D.J. McCall	6 ft 6 in (1.98 m)	190 lb (86 kg)	RS So	Concordia Lutheran	Fort Wayne, IN
F	24	Evan Hall	6 ft 7 in (2.01 m)	200 lb (91 kg)	So	Knott County Central	Hindman, KY
G	25	Ron Patterson	6 ft 2 in (1.88 m)	200 lb (91 kg)	RS Jr	Broad Ripple (Syracuse)	Indianapolis, IN
F	32	Elyjah Goss	6 ft 7 in (2.01 m)	190 lb (86 kg)	Fr	Plainfield East	Plainfield, IL
F	33	Giovanni Fraser	6 ft 8 in (2.03 m)	235 lb (107 kg)	Fr	Coral Springs	Coral Springs, FL
F/C	35	Noah Thomas	6 ft 9 in (2.06 m)	235 lb (107 kg)	RS Fr	Bridgton Academy	Whitestown
F	40	Evan Borgman	6 ft 9 in (2.06 m)	205 lb (93 kg)	Fr	Jac-Cen-Del	Batesville, IN
F	45	Aaron Brennan	6 ft 6 in (1.98 m)	200 lb (91 kg)	Jr	Guerin Catholic	Noblesville, IN

Head coach

- Jason Gardner (Arizona)

Assistant coach(es)

- Matt Crenshaw (IUPUI)
- Scott Gillespie (Ripon)
- Roy Hairston (Purdue)

Legend

- (C) Team captain
- (S) Suspended
- (I) Ineligible
- (W) Walk-on
- Injured
- Current redshirt

Roster
Last update: September 1, 2016

== Schedule and results ==
Date time, TV	Rank^{#}	Opponent^{#}	Result	Record	Site (attendance) city, state
Exhibition
Nov 4, 2016*; 7:00 pm		Saint Joseph's (IN)	W 87–74		Indiana Farmers Coliseum (1,007); Indianapolis, IN
Non-conference regular season
Nov 11, 2016*; 8:00 pm		at Eastern Kentucky	L 87–97	0–1	McBrayer Arena (2,300); Richmond, KY
Nov 13, 2016*; 12:00 pm, ESPNU		at Michigan; 2K Sports Classic	L 65–77	0–2	Crisler Center (10,812); Ann Arbor, MI
Nov 18, 2016*; 2:00 pm, ESPN3		vs. Howard; 2K Sports Classic	W 77–55	1–2	Indiana Farmers Coliseum (843); Indianapolis, IN
Nov 19, 2016*; 1:00 pm, ESPN3		vs. Eastern Michigan; 2K Sports Classic	W 83–71	2–2	Indiana Farmers Coliseum (863); Indianapolis, IN
Nov 22, 2016*; 7:30 pm, FS1		at Marquette; 2K Sports Classic	L 79–104	2–3	Bradley Center (11,552); Milwaukee, WI
Nov 26, 2016*; 1:00 pm, Fox Sports Midwest		at SIU Edwardsville	L 58–61	2–4	Vadalabene Center (1,028); Edwardsville, IL
Nov 30, 2016*; 7:00 pm, ESPN3		at Illinois State	L 63–77	2–5	Redbird Arena (3,717); Normal, IL
Dec 3, 2016*; 2:00 pm, ESPN3		at Ball State	W 73–62	3–5	Worthen Arena (2,994); Muncie, IN
Dec 6, 2016*; 8:00 pm, ESPN3		at Illinois	L 77–85	3–6	State Farm Center (10,536); Champaign, IL
Dec 10, 2016*; 3:30 pm, ESPN3		at Miami (OH)	L 68–71	3–7	Millett Hall (1,268); Oxford, OH
Dec 12, 2016*; 7:00 pm, ESPN3		Urbana	W 109–67	4–7	Indiana Farmers Coliseum (909); Indianapolis, IN
Dec 17, 2016*; 6:00 pm		at Southern Utah	W 101–81	5–7	Centrum Arena (1,012); Cedar City, UT
Dec 20, 2016*; 8:00 pm		at Northwestern	L 65–87	5–8	Welsh-Ryan Arena (6,452); Evanston, IL
Dec 28, 2016*; 7:00 pm, ESPN3		Marian	W 81–60	6–8	Indiana Farmers Coliseum (1,104); Indianapolis, IN
Summit League regular season
Dec 31, 2016; 1:00 pm, ESPN3		Western Illinois	W 89–71	7–8 (1–0)	Indiana Farmers Coliseum (1,106); Indianapolis, IN
Jan 5, 2017; 8:00 pm, ESPN3		at North Dakota State	L 89–93	7–9 (1–1)	Scheels Center (2,728); Fargo, ND
Jan 7, 2017; 4:15 pm, ESPN3		at South Dakota	L 74–85	7–10 (1–2)	Sanford Coyote Sports Center (1,908); Vermillion, SD
Jan 11, 2017; 7;00 pm, ESPN3		Omaha	L 71–79	7–11 (1–3)	Indiana Farmers Coliseum (842); Indianapolis, IN
Jan 14, 2017; 4:00 pm, ESPN3		at Oral Roberts	W 91–85	8–11 (2–3)	Mabee Center (2,595); Tulsa, OK
Jan 18, 2017; 7:00 pm, ESPN3		South Dakota State	W 85–83	9–11 (3–3)	Indiana Farmers Coliseum (981); Indianapolis, IN
Jan 21, 2017; 1:00 pm, ESPN3		Denver	L 74–78	9–12 (3–4)	Indiana Farmers Coliseum (1,078); Indianapolis, IN
Jan 25, 2017; 7:30 pm		at Fort Wayne	L 73–103	9–13 (3–5)	Gates Sports Center (1,357); Fort Wayne, IN
Jan 28, 2017; 8:00 pm		at Western Illinois	L 69–78	9–14 (3–6)	Western Hall (843); Macomb, IL
Feb 1, 2017; 7:00 pm, ESPN3		North Dakota State	W 86–81 ^{OT}	10–14 (4–6)	Indiana Farmers Coliseum (1,098); Indianapolis, IN
Feb 8, 2017; 8:00 pm		at Omaha	W 89–78	11–14 (5–6)	Baxter Arena (1,678); Omaha, NE
Feb 11, 2017; 7:00 pm, ESPN3		Oral Roberts	L 68–74	11–15 (5–7)	Indiana Farmers Coliseum (1,029); Indianapolis, IN
Feb 15, 2017; 8:00 pm		at South Dakota State	L 67–81	11–16 (5–8)	Frost Arena (2,333); Brookings, SD
Feb 19, 2017; 3:30 pm, ALT		at Denver	W 83–72	12–16 (6–8)	Magness Arena (1,612); Denver, CO
Feb 23, 2017; 7:00 pm, ESPN3		Fort Wayne	W 83–82	13–16 (7–8)	Indiana Farmers Coliseum (1,543); Indianapolis, IN
Feb 25, 2017; 7:00 pm, ESPN3		South Dakota	L 85–92	13–17 (7–9)	Indiana Farmers Coliseum (1,255); Indianapolis, IN
The Summit League tournament
Mar 4, 2017; 9:30 pm, ESPN3	(7)	vs. (2) North Dakota State; Quarterfinals	W 76–57	14–17	Premier Center (9,399); Sioux Falls, SD
Mar 6, 2017; 9:30 pm, ESPN3	(7)	vs. (3) Omaha; Semifinals	L 62–90	14–18	Premier Center (11,235); Sioux Falls, SD
*Non-conference game. ^{#}Rankings from AP Poll. (#) Tournament seedings in parentheses. All times are in Eastern Time.
