= 2016–17 Oral Roberts Golden Eagles men's basketball team =

American college basketball season

2016–17 Oral Roberts Golden Eagles men's basketball
- Conference: The Summit League
- Record: 8–22 (4–12 The Summit)
- Head coach: Scott Sutton (18th season)
- Assistant coaches: Sean Sutton; Marc Stricker; Rodney Perry
- Home arena: Mabee Center

2016–17 Summit League men's basketball standings
	Conf.				Overall
Team	W		L	PCT	W		L	PCT
South Dakota	12	–	4	.750	22	–	12	.647
North Dakota State	11	–	5	.688	19	–	11	.633
Omaha	9	–	7	.563	18	–	14	.563
Fort Wayne	8	–	8	.500	20	–	13	.606
Denver	8	–	8	.500	16	–	14	.533
South Dakota State †	8	–	8	.500	18	–	17	.514
IUPUI	7	–	9	.438	14	–	18	.438
Western Illinois	5	–	11	.313	8	–	20	.286
Oral Roberts	4	–	12	.250	8	–	22	.267
† 2017 Summit League Tournament winner

The 2016–17 Oral Roberts Golden Eagles men's basketball team represented Oral Roberts University during the 2016–17 NCAA Division I men's basketball season. The Golden Eagles were led by 18th year head coach Scott Sutton and played their home games at the Mabee Center in Tulsa, Oklahoma as members of The Summit League. They finished the season 8–22, 4–12 in Summit League play to finish in last place. As a result, they failed to qualify for The Summit League tournament.

On April 10, 2017, the school fired all-time winningest coach Scott Sutton after 18 years. He finished with an overall record of 328–247. On April 28, the school hired Baylor assistant Paul Mills as the new head coach.

== Previous season ==
The Golden Eagles finished the 2015–16 season 14–17, 6–10 in Summit League play to finish in seventh place. They lost in the quarterfinals of The Summit League tournament to South Dakota State.

== Roster ==
2016–17 Oral Roberts Golden Eagles men's basketball team
Players
Coaches

Pos.	#	Name	Height	Weight	Year	Hometown
G	0	Aaron Young	5 ft 11 in (1.8 m)	170 lb (77 kg)	Sr	Edmond, Oklahoma
G	1	Kris Martin	6 ft 6 in (1.98 m)	186 lb (84 kg)	So	Frisco, Texas
G	3	Jontray Harris	6 ft 4 in (1.93 m)	180 lb (82 kg)	RS So	Austin, Texas
G	10	Jalen Bradley	6 ft 1 in (1.85 m)	180 lb (82 kg)	Sr	Norfolk, Nebraska
G	12	Isaac Gilliam	6 ft 2 in (1.88 m)	190 lb (86 kg)	Sr	Dripping Springs, Texas
G	13	Aaron Anderson	6 ft 3 in (1.91 m)	200 lb (91 kg)	RS Sr	Edmond, Oklahoma
G	20	Spencer Sutton	6 ft 4 in (1.93 m)	215 lb (98 kg)	Fr	Tulsa, Oklahoma
F	23	Emmanuel Nzekwesi	6 ft 8 in (2.03 m)	230 lb (104 kg)	Fr	Trophy Club, Texas
F	25	Javan White	6 ft 10 in (2.08 m)	230 lb (104 kg)	So	Ames, Iowa
G	30	Dezmond McDaniel	5 ft 11 in (1.8 m)	173 lb (78 kg)	Fr	Kansas City, Missouri
F	32	Kellen Manek	6 ft 7 in (2.01 m)	227 lb (103 kg)	Fr	Harrah, Oklahoma
G	33	Darian Harris	6 ft 6 in (1.98 m)	198 lb (90 kg)	RS Jr	Springdale, Arkansas
G	35	R.J. Smith	6 ft 5 in (1.96 m)	215 lb (98 kg)	Fr	Olathe, Kansas
C	44	Albert Owens	6 ft 9 in (2.06 m)	262 lb (119 kg)	Jr	Cedar Hill, Texas
F	52	Chris Miller	6 ft 8 in (2.03 m)	261 lb (118 kg)	Fr	Tulsa, Oklahoma

Head coach

- Scott Sutton (Oklahoma State)

Assistant coach(es)

- Sean Sutton (Oklahoma State)
- Marc Stricker (UMKC)
- Rodney Perry (Missouri State)

Legend

- (C) Team captain
- (S) Suspended
- (I) Ineligible
- (W) Walk-on
- Injured
- Current redshirt

Roster

== Schedule ==
Date time, TV	Opponent	Result	Record	Site (attendance) city, state
Exhibition
11/02/2016*; 7:00 pm	Southeastern Oklahoma State	W 82–75		Mabee Center; Tulsa, OK
Regular season
11/11/2016*; 6:00 pm, ESPNU	at Baylor	L 61–76	0–1	Ferrell Center (5,250); Waco, TX
11/14/2016*; 7:00 pm	Rogers State	W 87–76	1–1	Mabee Center (2,653); Tulsa, OK
11/18/2016*; 2:00 pm, CBSSN	vs. Ole Miss; Paradise Jam Quarterfinals	L 88–95 ^{OT}	1–2	Sports and Fitness Center (512); St. Thomas, VI
11/19/2016*; 2:30 pm	vs. Loyola–Chicago; Paradise Jam consolation round	L 53–78	1–3	Sports and Fitness Center (1,831); St. Thomas, VI
11/21/2016*; 11:30 am	vs. Montana; Paradise Jam 7th place game	L 48–67	1–4	Sports and Fitness Center (224); St. Thomas, VI
11/28/2016*; 7:00 pm, ESPN3	Tulsa; PSO Mayor's Cup	L 65–79	1–5	Mabee Center (4,230); Tulsa, OK
12/01/2016*; 6:00 pm, ESPN3	at Oakland	L 64–92	1–6	Athletics Center O'rena (2,607); Auburn Hills, MI
12/03/2016*; 3:30 pm, BTN	at Michigan State	L 76–80	1–7	Breslin Student Events Center (14,797); East Lansing, MI
12/07/2016*; 7:00 pm	at Oklahoma	L 66–92	1–8	Lloyd Noble Center (8,034); Normon, OK
12/10/2016*; 3:00 pm	John Brown	W 95–63	2–8	Mabee Center (2,220); Tulsa, OK
12/14/2016*; 7:00 pm, ESPN3	at Missouri State	L 76–86	2–9	JQH Arena (3,723); Springfield, MO
12/17/2016*; 7:00 pm, FS2	at No. 10 Creighton; Paradise Jam	L 65–66	2–10	CenturyLink Center Omaha (16,489); Omaha, NE
12/19/2016*; 7:00 pm, ESPN3	Little Rock	W 63–48	3–10	Mabee Center (2,849); Tulsa, OK
12/23/2016*; 3:00 pm	Richmond	W 87–72	4–10	Mabee Center (2,735); Tulsa, OK
Summit League regular season
12/28/2016; 8:00 pm, ALT2	at Denver	L 73–77	4–11 (0–1)	Magness Arena (1,347); Denver, CO
12/29/2016; 1:30 pm	at Fort Wayne	L 91–102	4–12 (0–2)	Gates Sports Center (1,015); Fort Wayne, IN
01/07/2017; 2:00 pm	at Western Illinois	L 71–86	4–13 (0–3)	Western Hall (813); Macomb, IL
01/12/2017; 7:00 pm, ESPN3	South Dakota State	W 94–88	5–13 (1–3)	Mabee Center (2,812); Tulsa, OK
01/14/2017; 3:00 pm, ESPN3	IUPUI	L 85–91	5–14 (1–4)	Mabee Center (2,595); Tulsa, OK
01/18/2017; 7:00 pm, ESPN3	South Dakota	W 90–80	6–14 (2–4)	Mabee Center (2,401); Tulsa, OK
01/21/2017; 7:00 pm, ESPN3	Omaha	W 103–86	7–14 (3–4)	Mabee Center (3,048); Tulsa, OK
01/25/2017; 7:00 pm, ESPN3	at North Dakota State	L 71–81	7–15 (3–5)	Scheels Center (4,353); Fargo, ND
01/28/2017; 3:00 pm, ESPN3	Fort Wayne	L 83–87	7–16 (3–6)	Mabee Center (2,534); Tulsa, OK
01/31/2017; 7:00 pm, ESPN3	Denver	L 69–93	7–17 (3–7)	Mabee Center (2,464); Tulsa, OK
02/04/2017; 7:00 pm, ESPN3	at South Dakota State	L 67–74	7–18 (3–8)	Frost Arena (3,917); Brookings, SD
02/08/2017; 7:00 pm, ESPN3	Western Illinois	L 60–63	7–19 (3–9)	Mabee Center (3,040); Tulsa, OK
02/11/2017; 6:00 pm, ESPN3	at IUPUI	W 74–68	8–19 (4–9)	Indiana Farmers Coliseum (1,029); Indianapolis, IN
02/16/2017; 7:00 pm	at Omaha	W 83–76	8–20 (4–10)	Baxter Arena (1,679); Omaha, NE
02/18/2017; 3:15 pm, ESPN3	at South Dakota	L 72–86	8–21 (4–11)	Sanford Coyote Sports Center (2,659); Vermillion, SD
02/22/2017; 7:00 pm, ESPN3	North Dakota State	L 80–82	8–22 (4–12)	Mabee Center (3,182); Tulsa, OK
*Non-conference game. ^{#}Rankings from AP Poll. (#) Tournament seedings in parentheses. All times are in Central Time Source.
