= 2016–17 Eastern Michigan Eagles men's basketball team =

American college basketball season

2016–17 Eastern Michigan Eagles men's basketball
- Conference: Mid-American Conference
- West Division
- Record: 16–17 (7–11 MAC)
- Head coach: Rob Murphy (6th season)
- Assistant coaches: Mike Brown; Kevin Mondro; Benny White
- Home arena: Convocation Center

2016–17 Mid-American Conference men's basketball standings
	Conf.				Overall
Team	W		L	PCT	W		L	PCT
East
Akron	14	–	4	.778	27	–	9	.750
Ohio	11	–	7	.611	20	–	11	.645
Buffalo	11	–	7	.611	17	–	15	.531
Kent State †	10	–	8	.556	22	–	14	.611
Bowling Green	7	–	11	.389	13	–	19	.406
Miami (OH)	4	–	14	.222	11	–	21	.344
West
Ball State	11	–	7	.611	21	–	13	.618
Western Michigan	11	–	7	.611	16	–	16	.500
Toledo	9	–	9	.500	17	–	17	.500
Eastern Michigan	7	–	11	.389	16	–	17	.485
Northern Illinois	7	–	11	.389	15	–	17	.469
Central Michigan	6	–	12	.333	16	–	16	.500
† 2017 MAC tournament winner

The 2016–17 Eastern Michigan Eagles men's basketball team represented Eastern Michigan University during the 2016–17 NCAA Division I men's basketball season. The Eagles, led by sixth-year head coach Rob Murphy, played their home games at the Convocation Center in Ypsilanti, Michigan as members of the West Division of the Mid-American Conference.

Despite being voted to finish 1st in the MAC West, they finished the regular season 16–17, 7–11 in MAC play to finish in a tie for eighth place. Due to tiebreaking rules, they received the No. 8 seed in the MAC tournament. They advanced to the quarterfinals of the MAC Tournament, where they lost to Akron.

== Previous season ==
The Eagles finished the 2015–16 season 18–15, 9–9 in MAC play to finish in a tie for third place in the West Division. They defeated Toledo in the first round of the MAC tournament before losing to Akron in the quarterfinals.

== Departures ==
Name	Number	Pos.	Height	Weight	Year	Hometown	Notes
LaMonta Stone II	3	G	5'9"	160	Freshman	Bowling Green, OH	Transferred
Brandon Nazione	4	F	6'8"	225	Senior	Howell, MI	Graduated
Jodan Price	5	G/F	6'8"	185	RS Junior	Indianapolis, IN	Graduate transferred to Georgia Tech
Daryl Kirkland	12	G	6'2"	170	Freshman	Grand Rapids, MI	Walk-on; left the team for personal reasons
Trent Perry	13	G	6'4"	190	RS Sophomore	Franklin, TN	Walk-on; transferred to Cumberland
Jordan Martin	22	G	6'3"	195	RS Senior	Detroit, MI	Graduated
Ethan Alvano	25	G	6'1"	165	Sophomore	Corona, CA	Transferred to Cal State San Marcos

=== Incoming transfers ===
Name	Number	Pos.	Height	Weight	Year	Hometown	Previous School
Paul Jackson	3	G	6'1"	178	Junior	Lithonia, GA	Transferred from Eastern Kentucky. Under NCAA transfer rules, Jackson will have to sit out for the 2016–17 season. Will have two years of remaining eligibility.
Terry Harris	4	G/F	6'6"	215	Junior	Dix Hills, NY	Transferred from Houston Baptist. Under NCAA transfer rules, Harris will have to sit out for the 2016–17 season. Will have two years of remaining eligibility.
Elijah Minnie	5	F	6'8"	210	Junior	Monessen, PA	Transferred from Robert Morris. Under NCAA transfer rules, Minnie will have to sit out for the 2016–17 season. Will have two years of remaining eligibility.
Lamar Wofford-Humphrey	23	F	6'8"	220	Junior	Flossmoor, IL	Junior college transferred from Butler CC
Baylee Steele	40	F	6'11"	220	Sophomore	Norwalk, IA	Junior college transferred to Des Moines Area CC

== Recruiting class of 2016 ==
College recruiting information
Name	Hometown	School	Height	Weight	Commit date
Ty Groce; PF	Ypsilanti, MI	Lincoln High School	6 ft 8 in (2.03 m)	190 lb (86 kg)	Oct 31, 2015
Ty Groce; PF	Recruit ratings: Scout: Rivals: (NR)				
Overall recruit ranking:
Note: In many cases, Scout, Rivals, 247Sports, On3, and ESPN may conflict in their listings of height and weight.; In these cases, the average was taken. ESPN grades are on a 100-point scale.; Sources: "2016 Team Ranking". Rivals.

== Roster ==
2016–17 Eastern Michigan Eagles men's basketball team
Players
Coaches

Pos.	#	Name	Height	Weight	Year	Previous school	Hometown
G	0	Raven Lee	6 ft 3 in (1.91 m)	190 lb (86 kg)	RS Sr	Romulus	Detroit, MI
G	1	Tim Bond	6 ft 7 in (2.01 m)	160 lb (73 kg)	Jr	City College HS	Baltimore, MD
F/C	2	James Thompson IV	6 ft 10 in (2.08 m)	220 lb (100 kg)	So	Parkview Baptist	Baton Rouge, LA
G	3	Paul Jackson (I) (redshirt)	6 ft 1 in (1.85 m)	178 lb (81 kg)	Jr	Martin Luther King Jr. Eastern Kentucky	Stone Mountain, GA
G/F	4	Terry Harris (I) (redshirt)	6 ft 6 in (1.98 m)	215 lb (98 kg)	Jr	Half Hollow Hills West; Houston Baptist	Dix Hills, NY
F	5	Elijah Minnie (I) (redshirt)	6 ft 9 in (2.06 m)	210 lb (95 kg)	Jr	Lincoln Park; Robert Morris	Monessen, PA
G	10	Willie Mangum VI	6 ft 1 in (1.85 m)	180 lb (82 kg)	Sr	Marshall; San Jacinto College	Richmond, VA
G	12	Jalen Brown (W)	5 ft 9 in (1.75 m)	154 lb (70 kg)	Fr	Harper Woods	Harper Woods, MI
F	15	Jordan Nobles	6 ft 9 in (2.06 m)	195 lb (88 kg)	RS So	Canton	Canton, MI
F	20	Blake Brown (W)	6 ft 7 in (2.01 m)	173 lb (78 kg)	RS So	Novi	Novi, MI
F	21	Quaran Jones (W)	6 ft 7 in (2.01 m)	225 lb (102 kg)	RS Jr	Ecrose; Findlay	Dearborn Heights, MI
F	23	Lamar Wofford-Humphrey	6 ft 9 in (2.06 m)	235 lb (107 kg)	RS Jr	Homewood-Flossmoor; Butler CC	Flossmoor, IL
F	31	Ty Groce	6 ft 7 in (2.01 m)	195 lb (88 kg)	Fr	Lincoln	Ypsilanti, MI
G	32	Ty Toney	6 ft 3 in (1.91 m)	225 lb (102 kg)	Sr	Alpharetta; Georgia Highlands College	Alpharetta, GA
F	35	Nick Madray	6 ft 9 in (2.06 m)	225 lb (102 kg)	RS Jr	Stephen Lewis/Findlay Prep; Binghamton	Mississauga, ON
F/C	40	Baylee Steele	6 ft 11 in (2.11 m)	235 lb (107 kg)	So	Norwalk; Des Moines Area CC	Norwalk, IA

Head coach

- Rob Murphy (Central State)

Assistant coach(es)

- Mike Brown (Wayne State (MI))
- Kevin Mondro (Detroit Mercy)
- Benny White (Michigan State)

Legend

- (C) Team captain
- (S) Suspended
- (I) Ineligible
- (W) Walk-on
- Injured
- Current redshirt

Roster

== Schedule and results ==
Date time, TV	Rank^{#}	Opponent^{#}	Result	Record	Site (attendance) city, state
Non-conference regular season
11/11/2016*; 7:00 PM, ACCN Extra		at Pittsburgh; 2K Sports Classic	L 90–93 ^{2OT}	0–1	Petersen Events Center (6,411); Pittsburgh, PA
11/13/2016*; 2:00 PM, ESPN3		at SMU; 2K Sports Classic	L 64–91	0–2	Moody Coliseum (6,582); Dallas, TX
11/15/2016*; 11:00 AM, ESPN3		Rochester; Future Eagles Day	W 78–63	1–2	Convocation Center (2,109); Ypsilanti, MI
11/18/2016*; 12:00 AM, ESPN3		vs. Gardner–Webb; 2K Sports Classic semifinals	W 76–68	2–2	Indiana Farmers Coliseum (843); Indianapolis, IN
11/19/2016*; 1:00 pm		at IUPUI; 2K Sports Classic	L 71–83	2–3	Indiana Farmers Coliseum (863); Indianapolis, IN
11/23/2016*; 2:00 PM, ESPN3		Madonna	W 97–60	3–3	Convocation Center (631); Ypsilanti, MI
11/26/2016*; 1:04 PM, ESPN3		Nebraska–Omaha	W 94–77	4–3	Convocation Center (578); Ypsilanti, MI
11/30/2016*; 7:00 PM, ESPN3		at Detroit	W 87–61	5–3	Calihan Hall (1,250); Detroit, MI
12/11/2016*; 2:00 PM, ESPN3		Siena Heights	W 117–55	6–3	Convocation Center (708); Ypsilanti, MI
12/17/2016*; 7:00 PM		at Vermont	L 74–82	6–4	Patrick Gym (1,775); Burlington, VT
12/19/2016*; 7:00 PM, ESPNU		at Syracuse	L 57–105	6–5	Carrier Dome (16,778); Syracuse, NY
12/22/2016*; 2:00 PM, ESPN3		Marygrove	W 101–48	7–5	Convocation Center (568); Ypsilanti, MI
12/29/2016*; 2:00 PM, ESPN3		Long Beach State	W 98–72	8–5	Convocation Center (928); Ypsilanti, MI
MAC regular season
01/03/2017; 7:00 PM, ESPN3		Central Michigan; Michigan MAC Trophy	W 85–63	9–5 (1–0)	Convocation Center (1,472); Ypsilanti, MI
01/07/2017; 2:30 PM, ESPN3		Buffalo	L 68–77	9–6 (1–1)	Convocation Center (1,862); Ypsilanti, MI
01/10/2017; 7:00 PM, ESPN3		at Bowling Green	W 81–53	10–6 (2–1)	Stroh Center (1,605); Bowling Green, OH
01/14/2017; 3:30 PM, ESPN3		at Ohio	W 53–49	11–6 (3–1)	Convocation Center (7535); Athens, OH
01/17/2017; 7:00 PM, ESPN3		Western Michigan; Michigan MAC Trophy	W 86–80	12–6 (4–1)	Convocation Center (1,485); Ypsilanti, MI
01/20/2017; 6:30 PM, CBSSN		at Akron	L 63–70	12–7 (4–2)	James A. Rhodes Arena (3,625); Akron, OH
01/24/2017; 7:00 PM, ESPN3		Ball State	L 80–88	12–8 (4–3)	Convocation Center (967); Ypsilanti, MI
01/28/2017; 3:30 PM, ESPN3		at Miami (OH)	W 74–57	13–8 (5–3)	Millett Hall (1,427); Oxford, OH
01/31/2017; 7:00 PM, ESPN3		Kent State	L 64–70	13–9 (5–4)	Convocation Center (1,198); Ypsilanti, MI
02/04/2017; 3:30 PM, ESPN3		at Northern Illinois	L 69–81	13–10 (5–5)	Convocation Center (2,443); DeKalb, IL
02/07/2017; 7:00 PM, ESPN3		at Toledo	L 57–73	13–11 (5–6)	Savage Arena (4,222); Toledo, OH
02/11/2017; 12:00 PM, ESPNU		Akron	L 76–87	13–12 (5–7)	Convocation Center (1,397); Ypsilanti, MI
02/14/2017; 7:00 PM, ESPN3		Ohio	L 71–79	13–13 (5–8)	Convocation Center (858); Ypsilanti, MI
02/18/2017; 4:00 PM, ESPN3		at Western Michigan; Michigan MAC Trophy	L 80–88	13–14 (5–9)	University Arena (2,389); Kalamazoo, MI
02/21/2017; 7:00 PM, ESPN3		at Ball State	L 72–79	13–15 (5–10)	Worthen Arena (3,088); Muncie, IN
02/25/2017; 12:00 PM, ESPN3		Northern Illinois	W 84–68	14–15 (6–10)	Convocation Center (1,115); Ypsilanti, MI
02/28/2017; 7:00 PM, ESPN3		at Central Michigan; Michigan MAC Trophy	W 109–81	15–15 (7–10)	McGuirk Arena (2,945); Mount Pleasant, MI
03/03/2017; 7:00 PM, ESPN3		Toledo	L 56–60	15–16 (7–11)	Convocation Center (3,078); Ypsilanti, MI
MAC tournament
03/06/2017; 7:00 pm, ESPN3	(8)	(9) Northern Illinois; First round	W 72–69	16–16	Convocation Center (981); Ypsilanti, MI
03/09/2017; Noon, BCSN/ESPN3	(8)	vs. (1) Akron; Quarterfinals	L 62-79	16-17	Quicken Loans Arena; Cleveland, OH
*Non-conference game. ^{#}Rankings from AP Poll. (#) Tournament seedings in parentheses. All times are in Eastern Time Source.

== See also ==
- 2016–17 Eastern Michigan Eagles women's basketball team
