= T. J. Otzelberger =

American basketball coach (born 1977)

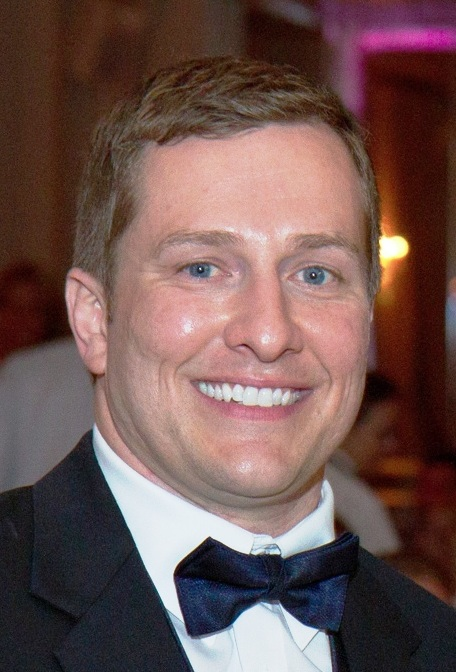
- Otzelberger in 2013

Current position
- Title: Head coach
- Team: Iowa State
- Conference: Big 12
- Record: 127–54 (.702)
- Annual salary: $6 million

Biographical details
- Born: September 17, 1977 (age 49); Milwaukee, Wisconsin, U.S.

Playing career
- 1998–2001: Wisconsin–Whitewater
- Position: Point guard

Coaching career (HC unless noted)
- 2001–2004: Burlington Catholic Central HS
- 2004–2005: Chipola College (assistant)
- 2006–2010: Iowa State (assistant)
- 2010–2013: Iowa State (associate HC)
- 2013–2015: Washington (assistant)
- 2015–2016: Iowa State (assistant)
- 2016–2019: South Dakota State
- 2019–2021: UNLV
- 2021–present: Iowa State

Head coaching record
- Overall: 226–117 (.659) (college)
- Tournaments: 5–6 (NCAA Division I); 0–1 (NIT)

Accomplishments and honors

Championships
- 2 Summit League tournament (2017, 2018); 2 Summit League regular season (2018, 2019); Big 12 tournament (2024)

Awards
- Summit League Coach of the Year (2018)

Thomas John Otzelberger (born September 17, 1977) is an American college basketball coach who is currently the head men's basketball coach at Iowa State University.

== Early life ==
Otzelberger was born in Milwaukee, Wisconsin, the son of Thomas L. and Jackie A. Otzelberger. He attended Thomas More High School in Milwaukee, Wisconsin, where he was a three-year starter on the varsity basketball team. He played college basketball at the University of Wisconsin–Whitewater, and was team captain for two years.

== Personal life ==
On June 1, 2013, he married Alison Lacey, former ISU women's basketball standout, former WNBA player, and former coach of the Marshalltown Community College women's basketball team. They have three children.

=== Community service ===
Otzelberger is openly passionate about teaching young people and was actively involved in the National Association of Basketball Coaches "Stay in to Win" program. This program was set up to help students focus on making important decisions in order to become more successful in school and impact their overall quality of life. Otzelberger is also highly involved with the Boys and Girls Clubs of America. He is also a member of the Villa 7 Consortium, which aims to develop the nation's top assistant coaches.

== Coaching career ==
=== Early coaching career ===
From 2001 to 2004 Otzelberger served as a basketball coach at Burlington Catholic Central High School in Burlington, Wisconsin. He was promoted to varsity head coach and athletic director in 2003. For the 2004–2005 season, he moved to Marianna, Florida, to join the Chipola College staff as an assistant coach. In that season, the Indians finished 33–4, won the Panhandle Conference and placed third at the 2005 NJCAA national tournament in Hutchinson, Kansas.

=== Iowa State (assistant, 2006-2013, 2015-2016) ===
Otzelberger served on the Cyclones' coaching staff for eight seasons. He initially joined the Iowa State coaching staff under former Iowa State head coach Greg McDermott in 2006, and served under him as an assistant through the 2009–2010 season. When McDermott was succeeded by Fred Hoiberg in May 2010, Otzelberger was promoted to the position of associate head coach.

In 2011–2012, Hoiberg led Iowa State to a 23–11 overall record and a third-place finish in the Big 12 Conference, advancing to the NCAA tournament for the first time since 2005. The Cyclones defeated reigning national champion Connecticut in third round tourney action, before falling to eventual national champion Kentucky. In 2012–2013, the Cyclones finished 4th in the Big 12 Conference while advancing to the third round of the NCAA Tournament before losing to Ohio State on a buzzer beater. During this stretch, the Cyclones were among the nation's leading teams in scoring, returning the team to national prominence.

Due to his efforts during this period of time, Otzelberger was widely regarded as one of the top recruiters in the nation. His efforts have helped secure the services of Cyclone greats Mike Taylor, Craig Brackins, Diante Garrett, Scott Christopherson, Chris Babb, Chris Allen, Will Clyburn, Korie Lucious, Melvin Ejim, Georges Niang, Naz Long, and Matt Thomas, among others. In addition to recruiting, Otzelberger was in charge of opponent scouting and game planning for the Cyclones tournament run in 2012 and 2013.

=== Washington (2013-2015) ===
On May 7, 2013, Washington Huskies head coach Lorenzo Romar announced that Otzelberger had joined his staff as an assistant coach. NBC Sports called Coach Otzelberger's hiring at Washington as one of the top 10 key assistant coaching hires for the 2013–14 season. Following the 2014 season, Jay Bilas and Jeff Goodman ranked TJ as one of the top college head coaching candidates. On April 1, 2015, it was announced that Otzelberger was returning to Iowa State to replace Matt Abdelmassih.

=== South Dakota State (2016-2019) ===
On April 14, 2016, Otzelberger was named head coach of South Dakota State, replacing Scott Nagy, who left after 21 years to become the head coach at Wright State. In his first season as head coach, Otzelberger led the Jackrabbits to the Summit League tournament championship and an automatic berth into the NCAA tournament, losing in the first round to eventual tournament runner-up Gonzaga. On March 6, 2018, Otzelberger led the Jackrabbits back to the NCAA Tournament, their third straight trip to the Big Dance, with a 97–87 win over the University of South Dakota.

=== UNLV (2019-2021) ===
On March 27, 2019, the UNLV Runnin' Rebels announced Otzelberger would become their 13th head coach.

Otzelberger's first season with UNLV resulted in a 17-15 record and a 12-6 conference record, which was good for a tie for 2nd in the Mountain West Conference. On February 22, 2020, Otzelberger and the Runnin' Rebels defeated #4 San Diego State University, handing SDSU their first loss of the season. The Running' Rebels were defeated by Boise State 67-61 in the Quarterfinals of the Mountain West tournament, ending their season.

In Otzelberger's second season at the helm, UNLV finished with a worse record than the previous season, achieving a record of 12-15. However, the team experienced a serious disruption in the middle of the season, as the team did not play a game between December 5, 2020 and January 7, 2021 due to COVID-19 protocols. Otzelberger tested positive for COVID-19 in early December, which led UNLV to pause all basketball activities for the remainder of the calendar year.

=== Iowa State (head coach, 2021-present) ===
On March 18, 2021, Otzelberger was hired at Iowa State, replacing Steve Prohm who was fired after winning just two games in a COVID shortened season. Otzelberger got to work bringing in an almost entirely new roster of players who would fit his hard-nosed, defense-first mentality, recruiting a large group of transfer players and returning only one player from the 2020-2021 team. The team was led by transfers Izaiah Brockington and Gabe Kalscheur, and prized freshman Tyrese Hunter, finishing with only the 160th ranked offense by KenPom, but the 5th ranked defense. Otzelberger accomplished the nation's largest turnaround in his first year at the helm at Iowa State, winning 22 games and making the Sweet Sixteen of the NCAA tournament as an 11-seed after upset wins over 6-seed LSU and 3-seed Wisconsin. The Cyclones would fall to 10-seed Miami 70-56 in the Sweet 16, committing 18 turnovers. Otzelberger won his 100th career game on November 9, 2021, in an 84–73 victory over Kennesaw State.

After the 2021-2022 season, Tyrese Hunter left Iowa State to play basketball at the University of Texas, while Brockington left for the NBA. Otzelberger brought in Ames native and point guard Tamin Lipsey to replace Hunter, as well as guard Jaren Holmes from St. Bonaventure, who would be the team's leading scorer at 13.3 points per game. Lipsey would go on to embody the culture of Iowa State basketball under Otzelberger, playing hard nosed defense, hustling every play, and providing a steady leadership presence. Describing his impact in 2026, Otzelberger would go on to say, Our program has become Tamin in so many ways. [...] what he's done every single day for four years has impacted our program for not only the four years he has been here, but it will impact us in a very positive manner for many years going forward." In 2022-2023, Otzelberger would lead the Cyclones to a 19-14 record and a 6-seed in the 2023 NCAA tournament. Iowa State continued to establish it's defense-first, grinding mentality, ranking 8th in the nation in defense as a freshman Lipsey averaged 2.2 steals a game, while improving to the 114th-ranked offense. The Cyclones would lose to Kansas 71-58 in the semifinals of the Big 12 tournament, but earn a 6-seed in the NCAA tournament. Iowa State would be upset by 11-seed Pittsburgh in the first round of the NCAA tournament as the offense mustered just 41 points.

After a strong start to his tenure at Iowa State, Otzelberger's recruiting prowess would emerge again as Iowa State brought in five-star recruit Omaha Biliew, the first five-star recruit in program history, along with four-star recruit Milan Momcilovic from Milwaukee. Otzelberger also brought in transfers Keshon Gilbert from UNLV and Curtis Jones from Buffalo, who would be two of the team's top 3 scorers. Gilbert and Momcilovic would start alongside Lipsey as Otzelberger led the Cyclones to a 29-8 record with the best defense in college basketball, and an improved offense that ranked 52nd. Tamin Lipsey and Keshon Gilbert were recognized as All-Big 12 players. The Cyclones would go on to win the Big 12 Tournament, defeating No.1-ranked Houston 69-41 in the largest margin of victory in the history of the championship game. The Cyclones would be awarded a 2-seed in the NCAA tournament and defeat 15-seed South Dakota State and 7-seed Washington State to reach Otzelberger's second Sweet 16. Iowa State would then fall to 3-seed Illinois as Milan Momcilovic committed a crucial turnover in the final minutes.

With Gilbert, Jones, Lipsey, and Momcilovic returning for the 2024-2025 season, Otzelberger went to work supplementing a strong core with a large transfer class, bringing in St. Mary's power forward Joshua Jefferson, Northern Iowa wing Nate Heise, and centers Dishon Jackson and Brandton Chatfield. Jackson and Jefferson would start, while Curtis Jones would develop into one of the nation's best bench players, winning Big 12 Sixth Man of the Year as the leading bench scorer in the nation. The Cyclones would start the season with a 9-1 record, rising to No. 3 in the AP poll, and Otzelberger would receive an 8-year contract extension to keep him with the program through 2032. Under Otzelberger, Iowa State would see its highest ever poll ranking at No.2 in the January 13 AP poll. Otzelberger would lead the Cyclones to a 25-10 record overall and 13-7 in the Big 12, maintaining an elite defense while the offense achieved its highest ranking of the Otzelberger era, at 19th nationally. The Cyclones would defeat Cincinnati in the Big 12 tournament before falling 96-92 to BYU in the quarterfinals. Keshon Gilbert would injure his groin during the game against Cincinnati and miss the rest of the season. Otzelberger and Iowa State received a 3-seed in the NCAA tournament, where they would defeat 14-seed Lipscomb before losing to 6-seed Ole Miss 91-78 in the second round.

With Gilbert and Jones graduating and leaving for the NBA, Otzelberger decided to build the team around Lipsey, Jefferson, and Momcilovic. He brought in Virginia transfer Blake Buchanan to start at center, as well as talented four-star recruits Jamarion Batemon, Killyan Toure, and Dominykas Pleta, who would all see significant minutes throughout the upcoming season. During the 2025-2026 season, Otzelberger would lead the Cyclones to their best start in program history with an 16-0 start, going undefeated in non-conference play. This streak would include a win on the road over No. 1-ranked Purdue, which would tie the largest loss ever suffered by a number 1-ranked team at home. Iowa State would finish the season 29-8, with the 5th ranked defense and 21st ranked offense. Despite ranking lower than the previous year, the offense was actually the most efficient of the Otzelberger era, with an adjusted efficiency of 123.6. During the season, Otzelberger led Iowa State to match its program-record No. 2 AP ranking from the previous season on the January 12th AP poll. Momcilovic would break the program's single-season record for made 3 pointers, leading all of Division 1 with 136 made 3 pointers and a 48.7% 3 point percentage, while his fellow forward Joshua Jefferson would be named a consensus All-American, the first during Otzelberger's head coaching tenure. In their first game of the Big 12 Tournament, Iowa State would defeat Arizona State 91-42 in the biggest blowout in tournament history. The Cyclones would then go on to defeat Texas Tech before falling to Arizona, 82-80, in the semifinals as Arizona's Jaden Bradley hit a 15-foot game winning buzzer beater. Otzelberger's Cyclones were awarded a 2-seed in the NCAA tournament, but disaster struck as Jefferson badly sprained his ankle on a driving layup attempt two-and-a-half minutes into Iowa State's first round matchup against Tennessee State. Iowa State was able to weather Jefferson's absence to defeat 15-seed Tennessee State and 7-seed Kentucky and reach their third Sweet 16 under Otzelberger, but his rebounding ability and scoring were sorely missed as Iowa State fell 76-62 to 6-seed Tennessee. This would be Tamin Lipsey's last season as an Iowa State players, leaving a leadership void that Otzelberger would need to fill.

During the 2026 offseason, there was some speculation that Otzelberger could leave Iowa State to take the recently opened head coach position at North Carolina, but Otzelberger shut down any rumors, saying, "Any speculation with me and any other jobs or opportunities is not true. I'm the coach of the Cyclones, thrilled to be the coach of the Cyclones." Otzelberger would back up this statement by signing a new contract extension that raised his salary to $6 million and lasts until 2036.

Assistant coaches J.R. Blount and Kyle Green would leave Otzelberger's staff to become the head coaches at San Diego and Northern Iowa, respectively. Otzelberger would hire Cincinnati assistant Tim Buckley, who had worked with Otzelberger at UNLV, and Bradley assistant Allen Hanson, to replace Blount and Green.

== Coaching Philosophy ==
=== Coaching Style ===
Otzelberger believes in strong daily habits, with a regimented practice schedule that believes will help prepare his players for game day. He has 5 philosophical pillars that he preaches on a daily basis: gratitude, enthusiasm, toughness, integrity, and unity. These 5 components make up an overarching philosophy known as Category 5 Culture, or C5C. Otzelberger's teams like to dictate on defense with physical play and consistently force some of the most turnovers in the country. Otzelberger runs a no-middle trapping philosophy which aims to trap ball handlers to the sideline off of pick-and-rolls and trap larger players on the baseline on post-ups. This defensive philosophy is somewhat similar to the scheme run by Houston men's basketball coach Kelvin Sampson. On offense, he focuses on attacking the rim through drives by guards and forwards off of pick-and-rolls or dribble handoffs. His teams also prioritize attacking in transition to create efficient offense. Otzelberger prioritizes getting elite shooters like Milan Momcilovic open through a variety of down and flare screens. This philosophy has led Iowa State to a top 25 offense in both 2024 and 2025 as Otzelberger has been able to recruit and develop more talented offensive players.

=== Recruiting ===
Otzelberger prioritizes recruiting and retaining high school players to form the core of his teams, however he is open to using the transfer portal to fill specific holes within his team. Otzelberger prefers to start his recruiting work with high schoolers early, and spend large amounts of time with recruits throughout their time in high school to build a strong relationship. Otzelberger tends to look for players who are extremely dedicated to basketball around-the-clock and are the hardest of workers. He loves players who can fit his defense-first, aggressive philosophy. He likes guards that can get into the paint, exemplified by players like Keshon Gilbert, Tamin Lipsey, and Killyan Toure, and versatile and mobile big men like Hason Ward, Tre King, Joshua Jefferson, and Blake Buchanan. Otzelberger also cares that his recruits have a strong support system and that there is strong alignment between the player's goals for themself and Iowa State's vision for the player. Otzelberger has recruited the top 5 recruits by composite rating in Iowa State history. Otzelberger's recruiting presence is especially strong in his home state of Wisconsin, where he has been able to bring in 5 of the top 15 prospects from Wisconsin since 2021.

== Head coaching record ==
=== College ===
Record table
Season	Team	Overall	Conference	Standing	Postseason
South Dakota State Jackrabbits (Summit League) (2016–2019)
2016–17	South Dakota State	18–17	8–8	T–4th	NCAA Division I Round of 64
2017–18	South Dakota State	28–7	13–1	1st	NCAA Division I Round of 64
2018–19	South Dakota State	24–9	14–2	1st	NIT First Round
South Dakota State:		70–33 (.680)	35–11 (.761)		
UNLV Runnin' Rebels (Mountain West Conference) (2019–2021)
2019–20	UNLV	17–15	12–6	T–2nd	
2020–21	UNLV	12–15	8–10	7th	
UNLV:		29–30 (.492)	20–16 (.556)		
Iowa State Cyclones (Big 12 Conference) (2021–present)
2021–22	Iowa State	22–13	7–11	T–6th	NCAA Division I Sweet 16
2022–23	Iowa State	19–14	9–9	T–5th	NCAA Division I Round of 64
2023–24	Iowa State	29–8	13–5	2nd	NCAA Division I Sweet 16
2024–25	Iowa State	25–10	13–7	5th	NCAA Division I Round of 32
2025–26	Iowa State	29–8	12–6	T–3rd	NCAA Division I Sweet 16
2026–27	Iowa State	3–1	0–0		
Iowa State:		127–54 (.702)	54–38 (.587)		
Total:		226–117 (.659)			
National champion Postseason invitational champion Conference regular season champion Conference regular season and conference tournament champion Division regular season champion Division regular season and conference tournament champion Conference tournament champion
