= 2016–17 Fort Wayne Mastodons men's basketball team =

American college basketball season

2016–17 Fort Wayne Mastodons men's basketball

Lou Henson Classic champions

CIT, Quarterfinals
- Conference: Summit League
- Record: 20–13 (8–8 The Summit)
- Head coach: Jon Coffman (3rd season)
- Assistant coaches: Ryan Sims (2nd season); Mark Downey (6th season); Ben Botts (3rd season)
- Home arena: Gates Sports Center; Allen County War Memorial Coliseum

2016–17 Summit League men's basketball standings
	Conf.				Overall
Team	W		L	PCT	W		L	PCT
South Dakota	12	–	4	.750	22	–	12	.647
North Dakota State	11	–	5	.688	19	–	11	.633
Omaha	9	–	7	.563	18	–	14	.563
Fort Wayne	8	–	8	.500	20	–	13	.606
Denver	8	–	8	.500	16	–	14	.533
South Dakota State †	8	–	8	.500	18	–	17	.514
IUPUI	7	–	9	.438	14	–	18	.438
Western Illinois	5	–	11	.313	8	–	20	.286
Oral Roberts	4	–	12	.250	8	–	22	.267
† 2017 Summit League Tournament winner

The 2016–17 Fort Wayne Mastodons men's basketball team, formerly known as the IPFW Mastodons, represented Indiana University – Purdue University Fort Wayne during the 2016–17 NCAA Division I men's basketball season. The Mastodons, led by third-year head coach Jon Coffman, played their home games at the Gates Sports Center and the Allen County War Memorial Coliseum as members of The Summit League. They finished the season 20–13, 8–8 in Summit League play to finish in a three-way tie for fourth place. They defeated the number 3 ranked Indians Hoosiers 71–68 in overtime. They lost in the quarterfinals of the Summit League tournament to Omaha. They were invited to the CollegeInsider.com Tournament where they defeated Ball State in the first round and received a second round bye before losing in the quarterfinals to Texas A&M–Corpus Christi.

This was the first season in which the IPFW athletic program has been officially branded as "Fort Wayne", following a change in athletic department policy announced on August 8, 2016. The Summit League had started using "Fort Wayne" in 2012 as part of a conference initiative, and some IPFW teams had been using the "Fort Wayne" branding before the August 2016 announcement.

== Previous season ==
The Mastodons finished the 2015–16 season 24–10, 12–4 in Summit League play to finish in a tie for the regular season championship. They lost in the semifinals of the Summit League tournament to North Dakota State. As a regular season league champion who was also the No. 1 seed in their league tournament, they received an automatic bid to the National Invitation Tournament where they lost in the first round to San Diego State.

== Roster ==
2016–17 Fort Wayne Mastodons men's basketball team
Players
Coaches

Pos.	#	Name	Height	Weight	Year	Hometown
G	0	Mo Evans	6 ft 1 in (1.85 m)	185 lb (84 kg)	Sr	Indianapolis, IN
G	1	Bryson Scott	6 ft 1 in (1.85 m)	205 lb (93 kg)	Jr	Fort Wayne, IN
G/F	2	DeAngelo Stewart	6 ft 4 in (1.93 m)	205 lb (93 kg)	Jr	Detroit, MI
G	3	Jordon King	6 ft 4 in (1.93 m)	210 lb (95 kg)	Jr	Seattle, WA
G	5	Charles Ruise, Jr.	6 ft 1 in (1.85 m)	190 lb (86 kg)	So	Glen St. Mary, FL
G	11	Dylan Carl	6 ft 11 in (2.11 m)	205 lb (93 kg)	Fr	Alma, MI
G	12	Chris Rollins	6 ft 0 in (1.83 m)	160 lb (73 kg)	Fr	Detroit, MI
F	13	Jax Levitch	6 ft 7 in (2.01 m)	210 lb (95 kg)	Fr	Louisville, KY
F	15	Jordan Coblin	6 ft 1 in (1.85 m)	175 lb (79 kg)	Fr	Boca Raton, FL
G	21	Trevor Osborn	6 ft 0 in (1.83 m)	178 lb (81 kg)	Sr	Fort Wayne, IN
F	22	Xzavier Taylor	6 ft 9 in (2.06 m)	255 lb (116 kg)	RS Jr	Chicago, IL
G	32	Kason Harrell	6 ft 2 in (1.88 m)	192 lb (87 kg)	So	Pittsburgh, PA
F	34	Racine Talla	6 ft 9 in (2.06 m)	195 lb (88 kg)	RS Jr	Dakar, Senegal
C	45	Brent Calhoun	6 ft 9 in (2.06 m)	260 lb (118 kg)	RS Sr	Indianapolis, IN
G	55	John Konchar	6 ft 5 in (1.96 m)	207 lb (94 kg)	RS So	West Chicago, IL

Head coach

- Jon Coffman (Washington and Lee)

Assistant coach(es)

- Mark Downey (Charleston (WV))
- Ryan Sims (Indianapolis)
- Ben Botts (Purdue Fort Wayne)

Legend

- (C) Team captain
- (S) Suspended
- (I) Ineligible
- (W) Walk-on
- Injured
- Current redshirt

Roster
Last update: 9/14/2016

== Schedule and results ==
Date time, TV	Rank^{#}	Opponent^{#}	Result	Record	Site (attendance) city, state
Exhibition
11/03/2016*; 7:00 pm		Capital	W 97–67		Gates Sports Center (854); Fort Wayne, IN
Regular season
11/11/2016*; 8:00 pm		at Arkansas	L 83–92	0–1	Bud Walton Arena (13,787); Fayetteville, AR
11/13/2016*; 2:30 pm		Kenyon	W 117–60	1–1	Gates Sports Center (1,131); Fort Wayne, IN
11/16/2016*; 7:00 pm		at Illinois State	L 57–75	1–2	Redbird Arena (4,081); Normal, IL
11/19/2016*; 7:00 pm		UMass Lowell; Indiana Classic	W 94–81	2–2	Memorial Coliseum (1,667); Fort Wayne, IN
11/22/2016*; 9:00 pm, BTN		No. 3 Indiana; Indiana Classic	W 71–68 ^{OT}	3–2	Memorial Coliseum (11,076); Fort Wayne, IN
11/26/2016*; 1:30 pm		Mississippi Valley State; Indiana Classic	W 79–54	4–2	Memorial Coliseum (1,789); Fort Wayne, IN
11/28/2016*; 7:00 pm		Siena Heights; Indiana Classic	W 107–59	5–2	Gates Sports Center (923); Fort Wayne, IN
11/30/2016*; 7:00 pm		at Austin Peay	W 103–99	6–2	Dunn Center (1,748); Clarksville, TN
12/03/2016*; 2:30 pm		Miami (OH)	W 87–71	7–2	Memorial Coliseum (1,539); Fort Wayne, IN
12/06/2016*; 9:00 pm, ESPNU		at No. 23 Notre Dame	L 72–87	7–3	Edmund P. Joyce Center (7,204); South Bend, IN
12/10/2016*; 2:30 pm		Austin Peay	W 98–58	8–3	Memorial Coliseum (1,456); Fort Wayne, IN
12/18/2016*; 1:00 pm, ESPN3		at Stetson	W 93–74	9–3	Edmunds Center (793); DeLand, FL
12/22/2016*; 7:00 pm, ESPN3		at Detroit	W 93–86	10–3	Calihan Hall (1,257); Detroit, MI
12/29/2016; 7:00 pm		Western Illinois	L 91–93	10–4 (0–1)	Gates Sports Center (1,345); Fort Wayne, IN
12/31/2016; 2:30 pm		Oral Roberts	W 102–91	11–4 (1–1)	Gates Sports Center (1,015); Fort Wayne, IN
01/04/2017; 8:00 pm		at Omaha	W 80-78	12–4 (2–1)	Baxter Arena (1,559); Omaha, NE
01/07/2017; 7:00 pm		Denver	W 87–83	13–4 (3–1)	Gates Sports Center (1,164); Fort Wayne, IN
01/09/2017*; 7:00 pm		Olivet	W 115–60	14–4	Gates Sports Center (906); Fort Wayne, IN
01/14/2017; 2:00 pm		at South Dakota	L 63–66	14–5 (3–2)	Sanford Coyote Sports Center (1,905); Vermillion, SD
01/19/2017; 8:00 pm		at North Dakota State	L 83–89	14–6 (3–3)	Scheels Center (4,210); Fargo, ND
01/21/2017; 5:30 pm		at South Dakota State	L 67–77	14–7 (3–4)	Frost Arena (3,203); Brookings, SD
01/25/2017; 7:30 pm		IUPUI	W 103–73	15–7 (4–4)	Gates Sports Center (1,357); Fort Wayne, IN
01/28/2017; 4:00 pm, ESPN3		at Oral Roberts	W 87–83	16–7 (5–4)	Mabee Center (2,534); Tulsa, OK
02/04/2017; 6:00 pm		at Denver	L 73–76 ^{OT}	16–8 (5–5)	Magness Arena (1,656); Denver, CO
02/08/2017; 7:00 pm		South Dakota	L 82–93	16–9 (5–6)	Memorial Coliseum (1,404); Fort Wayne, IN
02/11/2017; 7:00 pm		Omaha	W 108–101 ^{OT}	17–9 (6–6)	Gates Sports Center (1,832); Fort Wayne, IN
02/15/2017; 7:00 pm		North Dakota State	W 77–61	18–9 (7–6)	Memorial Coliseum (1,733); Fort Wayne, IN
02/18/2017; 7:00 pm		South Dakota State	L 89–97	18–10 (7–7)	Gates Sports Center (1,521); Fort Wayne, IN
02/23/2017; 7:00 pm		at IUPUI	L 82–83	18–11 (7–8)	Indiana Farmers Coliseum (1,543); Indianapolis, IN
02/25/2017; 8:00 pm		at Western Illinois	W 96–92 ^{OT}	19–11 (8–8)	Western Hall (803); Macomb, IL
The Summit League tournament
03/05/2017; 9:30 pm, ESPN3	(6)	vs. (3) Omaha; Quarterfinals	L 80–84	19–12	Premier Center (9,837); Sioux Falls, SD
CIT
03/15/2017*; 7:00 pm, Facebook Live		Ball State; First Round; Lou Henson Classic	W 88–80	20–12	Gates Sports Center (1,479); Fort Wayne, IN
03/26/2017*; 3:00 pm, Facebook Live		at Texas A&M–Corpus Christi; Quarterfinals	L 62–78	20–13	Dugan Wellness Center (1,151); Corpus Christi, TX
*Non-conference game. (#) Tournament seedings in parentheses. All times are in Eastern Time.
