= K. J. Robinson =

American basketball player

KJ Robinson
Bashkimi Prizren
- Position: Point guard
- League: Basketligaen

Personal information
- Born: May 28, 1998 (age 28)
- Listed height: 6 ft 0 in (1.83 m)
- Listed weight: 190 lb (86 kg)

Career information
- High school: Blue Springs South (Blue Springs, Missouri)
- College: Omaha (2016–2020)
- NBA draft: 2020: undrafted
- Playing career: 2020–present

Career history
- 2020: Horsens IC
- 2020–present: Bashkimi Prizren

Kevin Robinson Jr. (born May 28, 1998) is an American professional basketball player for Bashkimi Prizren of the Kosovo Basketball Superleague. He played college basketball for Omaha.

== High school career ==
Robinson attended Blue Springs South High School in Blue Springs, Missouri where he was coached by Jimmy Cain. As a junior, he helped the Jaguars win their first-ever state championship in boys' basketball. Robinson scored his 1,000th point in a 71–60 win over Liberty High School during senior night. He posted 31 points in a 71–70 victory over McPherson High School, breaking the team's 44-game winning streak. Robinson averaged 24.9 points, 2.9 assists, 2.3 rebounds, and 1.7 steals per game, leading the team to the state quarterfinal. He was named The Examiner player of the year and finished with 1,607 points. Rated a three-star prospect, Robinson committed to Omaha.

== College career ==
On November 24, 2017, Robinson made seven 3-pointers and scored a career-high 25 points in an 86–85 loss to Tennessee Tech. As a sophomore at Omaha, Robinson averaged 9.6 points and 2.6 assists per game. Robinson averaged 11.1 points, 2.2 rebounds, 3.3 assists and 1.0 steals per game as a junior, posting 17 double-figure scoring games. He missed the first three games of his senior season due to a violation of team rules, and began coming off the bench when he returned. On December 21, 2019, Robinson scored a season-high 24 points in an 87–82 overtime win over Montana. He tied his season-high of 24 points on January 23, 2020, in an 87–82 overtime win over Western Illinois. As a senior, Robinson averaged 15.2 points, 2.1 rebounds and 2.7 assists per game and was an All-Summit League Honorable Mention selection. He became Omaha's 41st 1,000-point scorer in school history and had 26 double-figure scoring performances as a senior.

== Professional career ==
On July 21, 2020, Robinson signed his first professional contract with Horsens IC of the Basketligaen. He averaged 8.3 points, 1.9 rebounds and 1.3 assists per game. On December 21, Robinson signed with Bashkimi Prizren of the Kosovo Basketball Superleague.
