= 2016–17 Cincinnati Bearcats men's basketball team =

American college basketball season

2016–17 Cincinnati Bearcats men's basketball

NCAA tournament, Second Round
- Conference: American Athletic Conference

Ranking
- Coaches: No. 22
- AP: No. 18
- Record: 30–6 (16–2 AAC)
- Head coach: Mick Cronin (11th season)
- Assistant coaches: Larry Davis (11th season); Antwon Jackson (5th season); Darren Savino (7th season)
- Home arena: Fifth Third Arena

2016–17 American Athletic Conference men's basketball standings
	Conf.				Overall
Team	W		L	PCT	W		L	PCT
No. 11 SMU †	17	–	1	.944	30	–	5	.857
No. 18 Cincinnati	16	–	2	.889	30	–	6	.833
Houston	12	–	6	.667	21	–	11	.656
UCF	11	–	7	.611	24	–	12	.667
Memphis	9	–	9	.500	19	–	13	.594
UConn	9	–	9	.500	16	–	17	.485
Tulsa	8	–	10	.444	15	–	17	.469
Temple	7	–	11	.389	16	–	16	.500
East Carolina	6	–	12	.333	15	–	18	.455
Tulane	3	–	15	.167	6	–	25	.194
South Florida	1	–	17	.056	7	–	23	.233
† 2017 AAC tournament winner Rankings from AP poll

The 2016–17 Cincinnati Bearcats men's basketball team represented the University of Cincinnati in the 2016–17 NCAA Division I men's basketball season. The team played its home games at Fifth Third Arena, with a capacity of 13,176. The season marked the final year prior to major renovations to Fifth Third Arena. The Bearcats were led by 11th-year head coach Mick Cronin and were members of the American Athletic Conference. They finished the season 30–6, 16–2 to finish in second place in AAC play. They beat Tulsa and UConn in the AAC tournament before losing to SMU in the championship game. They received an at-large bid to the NCAA tournament as the No. 6 seed in the South region. They defeated No. 11-seeded Kansas State in the first round before losing to No. 3-seeded UCLA in the second round.

== Previous season ==
The Bearcats finished the 2015–16 season with a record of 22–11, 12–6 in AAC play to finish in a tie for third place in conference. They lost to UConn in four overtimes in the quarterfinals of the AAC tournament. The Bearcats received an at-large bid as a No. 9 seed to the NCAA tournament where they lost to Saint Joseph's in the first round.

== Preseason ==
At AAC Media Day, Cincinnati was picked to win the AAC regular season title and senior guard Troy Caupain was voted as AAC Preseason Co-Player of the Year. In addition, Gary Clark and Caupain were named to the Preseason All-AAC First Team.

== Offseason ==
=== Departing players ===
Name	Number	Pos.	Height	Weight	Year	Hometown	Notes
Octavius Ellis	2	F	6'10"	235	Senior	Memphis, Tennessee	Graduated
Farad Cobb	21	G	6'1"	170	Senior	West Palm Beach, Florida	Graduated
Coreontae DeBerry	22	C	6'9"	275	Senior	Holland, Michigan	Graduated
Shaq Thomas	24	F	6'7"	210	RS Senior	Paterson, New Jersey	Graduated

=== Incoming transfers ===
Name	Pos.	Height	Weight	Year	Hometown	Notes
Cane Broome	G	6'0"	170	Junior	East Hartford, CT	Transferred from Sacred Heart. Under NCAA transfer rules, Broome will have to sit out for the 2016–17 season. Will have two years of remaining eligibility.

=== Recruiting class of 2016 ===
College recruiting information
Name	Hometown	School	Height	Weight	Commit date
Jarron Cumberland; SG	Wilmington, Ohio	Wilmington High School	6 ft 4 in (1.93 m)	200 lb (91 kg)	Jul 1, 2015
Jarron Cumberland; SG	Recruit ratings: Scout: Rivals: 247Sports: (85)				
Nysier Brooks; C	Philadelphia, Pennsylvania	Life Center Academy	6 ft 10 in (2.08 m)	260 lb (120 kg)	Jun 30, 2015
Nysier Brooks; C	Recruit ratings: Scout: Rivals: 247Sports: (77)				
Overall recruit ranking: Scout: NR Rivals: NR 247Sports: 62 ESPN: 40
Note: In many cases, Scout, Rivals, 247Sports, On3, and ESPN may conflict in their listings of height and weight.; In these cases, the average was taken. ESPN grades are on a 100-point scale.; Sources: "Cincinnati 2016 Player Commits". ESPN.; "2016 Team Ranking". Rivals.

=== Recruiting class of 2017 ===
College recruiting information (2017)
Name	Hometown	School	Height	Weight	Commit date
Trevor Moore; SG	Houston, Texas	South Kent Prep	6 ft 4 in (1.93 m)	195 lb (88 kg)	Jun 29, 2016
Trevor Moore; SG	Recruit ratings: Scout: Rivals: 247Sports: (79)				
Eliel Nsoseme; C	Kinshasa, DR Congo	The RISE Centre Academy	6 ft 9 in (2.06 m)	185 lb (84 kg)	Aug 21, 2016
Eliel Nsoseme; C	Recruit ratings: Scout: Rivals: 247Sports: (NR)				
Keith Williams; SG	Brooklyn, New York	Bishop Loughlin Memorial High School	6 ft 5 in (1.96 m)	180 lb (82 kg)	Oct 4, 2016
Keith Williams; SG	Recruit ratings: Scout: Rivals: 247Sports: (80)				
Overall recruit ranking:
Note: In many cases, Scout, Rivals, 247Sports, On3, and ESPN may conflict in their listings of height and weight.; In these cases, the average was taken. ESPN grades are on a 100-point scale.; Sources: "Cincinnati 2017 Player Commits". ESPN.; "2017 Team Ranking". Rivals.

== Roster ==
2016–17 Cincinnati Bearcats men's basketball team
Players
Coaches

Pos.	#	Name	Height	Weight	Year	Previous school	Hometown
F	0	Quadri Moore	6 ft 8 in (2.03 m)	230 lb (104 kg)	Jr	Linden High School	Linden, New Jersey
G/F	1	Jacob Evans	6 ft 6 in (1.98 m)	210 lb (95 kg)	So	St. Michael the Archangel High School	Baton Rouge, Louisiana
G	3	Justin Jenifer	5 ft 10 in (1.78 m)	175 lb (79 kg)	So	Milford Mill Academy	Baltimore, Maryland
G	10	Troy Caupain (C)	6 ft 4 in (1.93 m)	210 lb (95 kg)	Sr	Cosby High School	Midlothian, Virginia
F	11	Gary Clark	6 ft 8 in (2.03 m)	225 lb (102 kg)	Jr	Clayton High School	Clayton, North Carolina
F	13	Trevon Scott	6 ft 8 in (2.03 m)	225 lb (102 kg)	RS Fr	McIntosh County Academy	Darien, Georgia
F	14	Jackson Bart (W)	6 ft 5 in (1.96 m)	210 lb (95 kg)	RS Fr	Oral Roberts	Bartlesville, Oklahoma
G	15	Cane Broome (redshirt)	6 ft 0 in (1.83 m)	160 lb (73 kg)	Jr	Sacred Heart	East Hartford, Connecticut
F	24	Kyle Washington	6 ft 9 in (2.06 m)	230 lb (104 kg)	RS Jr	NC State	Champlin, Minnesota
G	25	Kevin Johnson (C)	6 ft 3 in (1.91 m)	185 lb (84 kg)	Sr	Summit Country Day School	Cincinnati, Ohio
G	32	John Koz (W)	6 ft 1 in (1.85 m)	190 lb (86 kg)	Fr	Bay High School	Cleveland, Ohio
C	33	Nysier Brooks	6 ft 11 in (2.11 m)	240 lb (109 kg)	Fr	Advanced Prep International	Philadelphia, Pennsylvania
G	34	Jarron Cumberland	6 ft 5 in (1.96 m)	218 lb (99 kg)	Fr	Wilmington High School	Wilmington, Ohio
F	45	Zack Tobler (W)	6 ft 5 in (1.96 m)	225 lb (102 kg)	Sr	Covington Catholic High School	Fort Mitchell, Kentucky

Head coach

- Mick Cronin (Cincinnati)

Assistant coach(es)

- Larry Davis (Asbury)
- Darren Savino (NJCU)
- Antwon Jackson (Pikeville)

Legend

- (C) Team captain
- (S) Suspended
- (I) Ineligible
- (W) Walk-on
- Injured
- Current redshirt

Roster
Last update: December 26, 2016

=== Depth chart ===
Pos.	Starting 5	Bench 1	Bench 2
C	Kyle Washington	Nysier Brooks	Quadri Moore
PF	Gary Clark	Trevon Scott	Jackson Bart
SF	Jacob Evans	Zack Tobler
SG	Kevin Johnson	Jarron Cumberland	John Koz
PG	Troy Caupain	Justin Jenifer

== Schedule and results ==
Date time, TV	Rank^{#}	Opponent^{#}	Result	Record	Site (attendance) city, state
Exhibition
November 2, 2016*; 7:00pm, BearcatsTV		Bellarmine	W 64–55		Fifth Third Arena (5,979); Cincinnati, OH
Regular Season
November 11, 2016*; 7:00pm, ESPN3		Brown; Hall of Fame Tip Off	W 84–55	1–0	Fifth Third Arena (6,504); Cincinnati, OH
November 14, 2016*; 7:00pm, ESPNU	No. 24	Albany; Hall of Fame Tip Off	W 74–51	2–0	Fifth Third Arena (5,864); Cincinnati, OH
November 19, 2016*; 3:00pm, ESPN3	No. 24	vs. No. 21 Rhode Island; Hall of Fame Tip Off Semifinals	L 71–76	2–1	Mohegan Sun Arena (9,189); Uncasville, CT
November 20, 2016*; 3:30pm, ESPN2	No. 24	vs. Penn State; Hall of Fame Tip Off Consolation	W 71–50	3–1	Mohegan Sun Arena (9,119); Uncasville, CT
November 23, 2016*; 7:00pm, ESPN3		Samford	W 70–55	4–1	Fifth Third Arena (7,422); Cincinnati, OH
November 26, 2016*; 2:30pm, FS Ohio/ESPN3		Lipscomb	W 91–68	5–1	Fifth Third Arena (5,724); Cincinnati, OH
December 1, 2016*; 9:00pm, ESPN		at No. 19 Iowa State	W 55–54 ^{OT}	6–1	Hilton Coliseum (14,384); Ames, IA
December 4, 2016*; 8:00pm, ESPNU		Bowling Green	W 85–56	7–1	Fifth Third Arena (7,162); Cincinnati, OH
December 10, 2016*; 4:30pm, FS1	No. 22	at No. 16 Butler	L 65–75	7–2	Hinkle Fieldhouse (9,176); Indianapolis, IN
December 13, 2016*; 7:00pm, ESPN3	No. 25	Texas Southern	W 96–58	8–2	Fifth Third Arena (6,612); Cincinnati, OH
December 17, 2016*; 2:30pm, FS Ohio/ESPN3	No. 25	Fairleigh Dickinson	W 119–68	9–2	Fifth Third Arena (7,017); Cincinnati, OH
December 22, 2016*; 7:00pm, CBSSN	No. 24	Marshall	W 93–91 ^{OT}	10–2	Fifth Third Arena (10,540); Cincinnati, OH
December 28, 2016; 9:00pm, ESPNU	No. 23	at Temple	W 56–50	11–2 (1–0)	Liacouras Center (5,478); Philadelphia, PA
January 1, 2017; 7:00pm, CBSSN	No. 23	Tulane	W 92–56	12–2 (2–0)	Fifth Third Arena (10,328); Cincinnati, OH
January 7, 2017; 9:00pm, ESPNU	No. 22	at Houston	W 67–58	13–2 (3–0)	Hofheinz Pavilion (4,875); Houston, TX
January 12, 2017; 9:00pm, ESPN	No. 22	SMU	W 66–64	14–2 (4–0)	Fifth Third Arena (11,344); Cincinnati, OH
January 15, 2017; 4:00pm, CBSSN	No. 22	at East Carolina	W 55–46	15–2 (5–0)	Williams Arena (4,597); Greenville, NC
January 18, 2017; 7:00pm, CBSSN	No. 20	Temple	W 81–74	16–2 (6–0)	Fifth Third Arena (10,718); Cincinnati, OH
January 21, 2017; 4:00pm, CBSSN	No. 20	at Tulane	W 78–61	17–2 (7–0)	Devlin Fieldhouse (2,001); New Orleans, LA
January 26, 2017*; 7:00pm, ESPN2	No. 19	No. 24 Xavier; Crosstown Shootout	W 86–78	18–2	Fifth Third Arena (13,477); Cincinnati, OH
January 29, 2017; 4:00pm, CBSSN	No. 19	South Florida	W 94–53	19–2 (8–0)	Fifth Third Arena (12,576); Cincinnati, OH
February 1, 2017; 9:00pm, CBSSN	No. 14	at Tulsa	W 57–55	20–2 (9–0)	Reynolds Center (5,002); Tulsa, OK
February 4, 2017; 4:00pm, ESPN2	No. 14	UConn	W 82–68	21–2 (10–0)	Fifth Third Arena (13,428); Cincinnati, OH
February 8, 2017; 9:00pm, ESPNU	No. 11	UCF	W 60–50	22–2 (11–0)	Fifth Third Arena (9,510); Cincinnati, OH
February 12, 2017; 4:00pm, ESPN	No. 11	at No. 25 SMU	L 51–60	22–3 (11–1)	Moody Coliseum (7,518); University Park, TX
February 15, 2017; 7:00pm, ESPNU	No. 18	at South Florida	W 68–54	23–3 (12–1)	USF Sun Dome (2,679); Tampa, FL
February 18, 2017; 12:00pm, ESPNU	No. 18	Tulsa	W 80–60	24–3 (13–1)	Fifth Third Arena (13,386); Cincinnati, OH
February 23, 2017; 7:00pm, ESPN	No. 15	Memphis; Rivalry	W 87–74	25–3 (14–1)	Fifth Third Arena (12,787); Cincinnati, OH
February 26, 2017; 3:00pm, CBSSN	No. 15	at UCF	L 49–53	25–4 (14–2)	CFE Arena (5,763); Orlando, FL
March 2, 2017; 7:00pm, ESPN2	No. 18	Houston	W 65–47	26–4 (15–2)	Fifth Third Arena (13,176); Cincinnati, OH
March 5, 2017; 12:00pm, CBS	No. 18	at UConn	W 67–47	27–4 (16–2)	Harry A. Gampel Pavilion (9,331); Storrs, CT
AAC Tournament
March 10, 2017; 7:00pm, ESPNU	(2) No. 15	vs. (7) Tulsa; Quarterfinals	W 80–61	28–4	XL Center (7,365); Hartford, CT
March 11, 2017; 5:35pm, ESPN2	(2) No. 15	vs. (6) Connecticut; Semifinals	W 81–71	29–4	XL Center (8,117); Hartford, CT
March 12, 2017; 3:15pm, ESPN	(2) No. 15	vs. (1) No. 12 SMU; Championship	L 56–71	29–5	XL Center (6,856); Hartford, CT
NCAA tournament
March 17, 2017*; 7:27pm, truTV	(6 S) No. 18	vs. (11 S) Kansas State; First Round	W 75–61	30–5	Golden 1 Center (16,514); Sacramento, CA
March 19, 2017*; 9:40pm, TBS	(6 S) No. 18	vs. (3 S) No. 8 UCLA; Second Round	L 67–79	30–6	Golden 1 Center (16,774); Sacramento, CA
*Non-conference game. ^{#}Rankings from AP Poll. (#) Tournament seedings in parentheses. S=South Region. All times are in Eastern Time. Source:

== Awards and milestones ==
=== American Athletic Conference honors ===
==== All-AAC Awards ====
- Sixth Man Award: Jarron Cumberland
- Sportsmanship Award: Troy Caupain

==== All-AAC Second Team ====
- Troy Caupain
- Kyle Washington

==== All-Rookie Team ====
- Jarron Cumberland

==== Player of the Week ====
- Week 4: Kyle Washington
- Week 7: Gary Clark
- Week 12: Jarron Cumberland

==== Rookie of the Week ====
- Week 6: Jarron Cumberland
- Week 8: Jarron Cumberland
- Week 17: Jarron Cumberland

== Rankings ==
Ranking movements Legend: ██ Increase in ranking ██ Decrease in ranking RV = Received votes
	Week																			
Poll	Pre	1	2	3	4	5	6	7	8	9	10	11	12	13	14	15	16	17	18	Final
AP	RV	24	RV	RV	22	25	24	24	23	22	20	19	14	11	18	15	18	15	18	Not released
Coaches'	25	25	RV	RV	23	23	23	23	23	22	20	19	14	11	17	16	20	18	16	22

*AP does not release post-NCAA Tournament rankings
