= 2016–17 UCF Knights men's basketball team =

American college basketball season

2016–17 UCF Knights men's basketball

NIT, Semifinals
- Conference: American Athletic Conference
- Record: 24–12 (11–7 AAC)
- Head coach: Johnny Dawkins (1st season)
- Assistant coaches: Kevin Norris; Jamil Jones; Robbie Laing
- Home arena: CFE Arena

2016–17 American Athletic Conference men's basketball standings
	Conf.				Overall
Team	W		L	PCT	W		L	PCT
No. 11 SMU †	17	–	1	.944	30	–	5	.857
No. 18 Cincinnati	16	–	2	.889	30	–	6	.833
Houston	12	–	6	.667	21	–	11	.656
UCF	11	–	7	.611	24	–	12	.667
Memphis	9	–	9	.500	19	–	13	.594
UConn	9	–	9	.500	16	–	17	.485
Tulsa	8	–	10	.444	15	–	17	.469
Temple	7	–	11	.389	16	–	16	.500
East Carolina	6	–	12	.333	15	–	18	.455
Tulane	3	–	15	.167	6	–	25	.194
South Florida	1	–	17	.056	7	–	23	.233
† 2017 AAC tournament winner Rankings from AP poll

The 2016–17 UCF Knights men's basketball team represented the University of Central Florida during the 2016–17 NCAA Division I men's basketball season. The Knights were members of the American Athletic Conference. The Knights, in the program's 48th season of basketball, were led by first-year head coach Johnny Dawkins and played their home games at the CFE Arena on the university's main campus in Orlando, Florida. They finished the season 24–12, 11–7 in AAC play to finish in fourth place. They defeated Memphis in the quarterfinals of the AAC tournament before losing in the semifinals to SMU. They were invited to the National Invitation Tournament, where they defeated Colorado, Illinois State and Illinois to advance to the semifinals at Madison Square Garden for the first time in school history, where they lost to the eventual NIT champion, TCU.

== Previous season ==
The Knights finished the season with a record of 12–18, 6–12 in AAC play to finish in seventh place in the conference. They lost in the first round of the AAC tournament to Tulane.

After the season, Donnie Jones was fired as UCF's head coach. On March 24, 2016, the school hired Johnny Dawkins as head coach.

== Departures ==
Name	Number	Pos.	Height	Weight	Year	Hometown	Reason for departure
Brandan Boyle	00	G	6'1"	190	Freshman	Rahway, NJ	Transferred to ASA College
Daiquan Walker	4	G	6'2"	185	Senior	Philadelphia, PA	Graduated
Adonys Henriquez	10	G	6'6"	210	Sophomore	Orlando, FL	Transferred to Saint Louis
Shaheed Davis	33	F	6'9"	210	Senior	Warren, OH	Graduated
Justin McBride	34	C	6'10"	325	Junior	Starke, FL	Transferred to Valdosta State
Stephon Blair	52	F	6'9"	255	Senior	Fort Lauderdale, FL	Graduated

=== Incoming transfers ===
Name	Number	Pos.	Height	Weight	Year	Hometown	Previous school
Terrell Allen	2	G	6'2"	180	Sophomore	Upper Marlboro, MD	Transferred from Drexel. Under NCAA transfer rules, Allen had to sit out for the 2016–17 season. Had three years of remaining eligibility.
Dayon Griffin	10	G	6'5"	188	Junior	St. Petersburg, FL	Transferred from Louisiana Tech. Under NCAA transfer rules, Griffin had to sit out for the 2016–17 season. Had two years of remaining eligibility.
Rokas Ulvydas	11	F	6'11"	240	Junior	Kaunas, Lithuania	Transferred from Texas Tech. Under NCAA transfer rules, Ulvydas had to sit out for the 2016–17 season. Had two years of remaining eligibility.
Nick Banyard	14	F	6'8"	225	RS senior	Flower Mound, TX	Transferred from Illinois State. Was eligible to play immediately, since he graduated from Illinois State.
Aubrey Dawkins	15	G/F	6'6"	205	Junior	Palo Alto, CA	Transferred from Michigan. Under NCAA transfer rules, Dawkins had to sit out for the 2016–17 season. Had two years of remaining eligibility.

== Incoming recruits ==
College recruiting
Name	Hometown	School	Height	Weight	Commit date
Clayton Hughes; SF	Jackson, TN	University School of Jackson	6 ft 5 in (1.96 m)	190 lb (86 kg)	Sep 10, 2015
Clayton Hughes; SF	Recruit ratings: Scout: Rivals: (NR)				
Caesar DeJesus; SF	Teaneck, NJ	Mount Zion Baptist Christian School	6 ft 2 in (1.88 m)	165 lb (75 kg)	May 17, 2016
Caesar DeJesus; SF	Recruit ratings: Scout: Rivals: (NR)				
Overall recruit ranking:
Note: In many cases, Scout, Rivals, 247Sports, On3, and ESPN may conflict in their listings of height and weight.; In these cases, the average was taken. ESPN grades are on a 100-point scale.; Sources: "2016 Team Ranking". Rivals.

=== Recruiting class of 2017 ===
College recruiting (2017)
Name	Hometown	School	Height	Weight	Commit date
Daniel Lewis; SG	Atlanta, GA	Westlake High School	6 ft 4 in (1.93 m)	175 lb (79 kg)	May 17, 2016
Daniel Lewis; SG	Recruit ratings: Scout: Rivals: (NR)				
Overall recruit ranking:
Note: In many cases, Scout, Rivals, 247Sports, On3, and ESPN may conflict in their listings of height and weight.; In these cases, the average was taken. ESPN grades are on a 100-point scale.; Sources: "2017 Team Ranking". Rivals.

== Roster ==
2016–17 UCF Knights men's basketball team
Players
Coaches

Pos.	#	Name	Height	Weight	Year	Previous school	Hometown
G/F	0	Tank Efianayi	6 ft 6 in (1.98 m)	210 lb (95 kg)	Sr	Daytona State College	Orlando, Florida
G	1	B. J. Taylor	6 ft 2 in (1.88 m)	200 lb (91 kg)	RS So	William R. Boone High School	Orlando, Florida
G	2	Terrell Allen (redshirt)	6 ft 2 in (1.88 m)	180 lb (82 kg)	So	Drexel	Upper Marlboro, Maryland
G/F	3	A. J. Davis	6 ft 9 in (2.06 m)	215 lb (98 kg)	RS Jr	Tennessee	Atlanta, Georgia
G	4	Ceasar DeJesus	6 ft 2 in (1.88 m)	195 lb (88 kg)	Fr	Mt. Zion Prep	Jersey City, New Jersey
G	5	Djordjije Mumin (W)	6 ft 5 in (1.96 m)	205 lb (93 kg)	Jr	American Heritage School	Podgorica, Montenegro
G	10	Dayon Griffin (redshirt)	6 ft 4 in (1.93 m)	205 lb (93 kg)	Jr	Louisiana Tech	St. Petersburg, Florida
F	11	Rokas Ulvydas (redshirt)	6 ft 11 in (2.11 m)	235 lb (107 kg)	So	Texas Tech	Kaunas, Lithuania
G	12	Matt Williams	6 ft 5 in (1.96 m)	215 lb (98 kg)	RS Sr	Jones High School	Orlando, Florida
F	14	Nick Banyard	6 ft 8 in (2.03 m)	230 lb (104 kg)	RS Sr	Illinois State	Flower Mound, Texas
G/F	15	Anthony Catotti (W)	6 ft 4 in (1.93 m)	200 lb (91 kg)	Jr	Seminole High School	Oviedo, Florida
G	20	Brock Stephenson (W)	6 ft 0 in (1.83 m)	190 lb (86 kg)	Fr	Dade Christian School	Miami, Florida
F	21	Chad Brown	6 ft 9 in (2.06 m)	240 lb (109 kg)	So	Deltona High School	Deltona, Florida
G	22	Chance McSpadden	6 ft 4 in (1.93 m)	180 lb (82 kg)	So	Winter Haven High School	Winter Haven, Florida
C	24	Tacko Fall	7 ft 6 in (2.29 m)	290 lb (132 kg)	So	Liberty Christian Prep	Dakar, Senegal
G	51	Nathan Laing	6 ft 0 in (1.83 m)	185 lb (84 kg)	RS Jr	Jacksonville State	Lillington, North Carolina
G/F		Aubrey Dawkins (redshirt)	6 ft 6 in (1.98 m)	205 lb (93 kg)	Jr	Michigan	Palo Alto, California

Head coach

- Johnny Dawkins (Duke)

Assistant coach(es)

- Kevin Norris (Miami (FL))
- Jamil Jones (Arkansas Tech)
- Robbie Laing (Troy)

Legend

- (C) Team captain
- (S) Suspended
- (I) Ineligible
- (W) Walk-on
- Injured
- Current redshirt

Roster
Last update: December 26, 2016

== Schedule and results ==
Date time, TV	Rank^{#}	Opponent^{#}	Result	Record	Site (attendance) city, state
Non-conference regular season
11/14/2016*; 5:00 pm, ESPN3		Nicholls State	W 80–56	1–0	CFE Arena (5,274); Orlando, FL
11/17/2016*; 5:00 pm, ESPN2		vs. Mississippi State; Charleston Classic quarterfinals	W 86–61	2–0	TD Arena (3,430); Charleston, SC
11/18/2016*; 9:30 pm, ESPNU		at College of Charleston; Charleston Classic semifinals	W 60–40	3–0	TD Arena (3,517); Charleston, SC
11/20/2016*; 9:30 pm, ESPN2		vs. No. 3 Villanova; Charleston Classic championship game	L 57–67	3–1	TD Arena (4,325); Charleston, SC
11/26/2016*; 7:30 pm, ESPN3		Seattle	W 67–51	4–1	CFE Arena (6,804); Orlando, FL
11/30/2016*; 7:00 pm, ESPN3		Stetson	W 81–45	5–1	CFE Arena (5,284); Orlando, FL
12/03/2016*; 1:00 pm		at Massachusetts	W 65–62	6–1	Mullins Center (3,911); Amherst, MA
12/10/2016*; 2:00 pm, ESPN3		Maryland Eastern Shore	W 76–58	7–1	CFE Arena (3,579); Orlando, FL
12/12/2016*; 7:00 pm, ESPN3		Penn	L 49–58	7–2	CFE Arena (3,088); Orlando, FL
12/15/2016*; 7:00 pm		at George Washington	L 59–74	7–3	Charles E. Smith Center (2,891); Washington, D.C.
12/18/2016*; 12:00 pm, ESPN3		Miami (OH)	W 80–73 ^{OT}	8–3	CFE Arena (2,939); Orlando, FL
12/21/2016*; 7:00 pm, ESPN3		Bethune–Cookman	W 71–41	9–3	CFE Arena (3,348); Orlando, FL
AAC regular season
12/28/2016; 8:00 pm, ESPN3		at Tulane	W 85–72	10–3 (1–0)	Devlin Fieldhouse (3,906); New Orleans, LA
12/31/2016; 4:00 pm, ESPNU		Temple	W 77–53	11–3 (2–0)	CFE Arena (3,906); Orlando, FL
01/03/2017; 7:15 pm, ESPNews		East Carolina	W 48–45	12–3 (3–0)	CFE Arena (3,088); Orlando, FL
01/08/2017; 5:00 pm, CBSSN		at UConn	L 49–64	12–4 (3–1)	Gampel Pavilion (8,163); Storrs, CT
01/14/2017; 4:00 pm, CBSSN		Houston	W 77–70	13–4 (4–1)	CFE Arena (5,489); Orlando, FL
01/17/2017; 7:00 pm, ESPNews		South Florida; Rivalry	W 86–64	14–4 (5–1)	CFE Arena (5,765); Orlando, FL
01/22/2017; 4:00 pm, CBSSN		at Memphis	L 65–70	14–5 (5–2)	FedEx Forum (9,625); Memphis, TN
01/25/2017; 6:00 pm, ESPNews		SMU	L 60–65	14–6 (5–3)	CFE Arena (4,620); Orlando, FL
01/28/2017; 1:30 pm, ESPNews		at Tulsa	L 66–77	14–7 (5–4)	Reynolds Center (4,281); Tulsa, OK
02/01/2017; 7:00 pm, ESPNU		at Houston	L 64–82	14–8 (5–5)	Hofheinz Pavilion (3,681); Houston, TX
02/04/2017; 5:00 pm, ESPNews		Memphis	W 72–57	15–8 (6–5)	CFE Arena (5,463); Orlando, FL
02/08/2016; 9:00 pm, ESPNU		at No. 11 Cincinnati	L 50–60	15–9 (6–6)	Fifth Third Arena (4,229); Cincinnati, OH
02/11/2017; 6:00 pm, CBSSN		UConn	L 63–66	15–10 (6–7)	CFE Arena (5,215); Orlando, FL
02/14/2016; 7:00 pm, ESPNews		Tulsa	W 71–53	16–10 (7–7)	CFE Arena (3,528); Orlando, FL
02/18/2017; 4:00 pm, ESPNews		at East Carolina	W 61–58	17–10 (8–7)	Williams Arena (4,518); Greenville, NC
02/22/2017; 7:00 pm, ESPNU		at Temple	W 71–69	18–10 (9–7)	Liacouras Center (5,073); Philadelphia, PA
02/26/2017; 3:00 pm, CBSSN		No. 15 Cincinnati	W 53–49	19–10 (10–7)	CFE Arena (5,763); Orlando, FL
03/02/2017; 7:00 pm, ESPNU		at South Florida; Rivalry	W 59–56	20–10 (11–7)	USF Sun Dome (3,120); Tampa, FL
American Athletic Conference tournament
03/10/2017; 2:00 pm, ESPN2	(4)	vs. (5) Memphis; Quarterfinals	W 84–54	21–10	XL Center (1,844); Hartford, CT
03/11/2017; 3:00 pm, ESPN2	(4)	vs. (1) No. 12 SMU; Semifinals	L 59–70	21–11	XL Center (8,117); Hartford, CT
NIT
03/15/2017*; 7:00 pm, ESPN3	(4)	(5) Colorado; First Round – Illinois State Bracket	W 79–74	22–11	CFE Arena (3,675); Orlando, FL
03/20/2017*; 7:00 pm, ESPN	(4)	at (1) Illinois State; Second Round – Illinois State Bracket	W 63–62	23–11	Redbird Arena (7,984); Normal, IL
03/22/2017*; 7:00 pm, ESPN2	(4)	(2) Illinois; Quarterfinals – Illinois State Bracket	W 68–58	24–11	CFE Arena (10,011); Orlando, FL
03/28/2017*; 9:00 pm, ESPN	(4)	vs. (4) TCU; Semifinals	L 53–68	24–12	Madison Square Garden (5,210); New York, NY
*Non-conference game. ^{#}Rankings from AP Poll. (#) Tournament seedings in parentheses. All times are in Eastern Time.
