= 2016–17 UConn Huskies men's basketball team =

American college basketball season

2016–17 UConn Huskies men's basketball
- Conference: American Athletic Conference
- Record: 16–17 (9–9 AAC)
- Head coach: Kevin Ollie (5th season)
- Assistant coaches: Glen Miller; Ricky Moore; Dwayne Killings
- Home arena: Harry A. Gampel Pavilion; XL Center

2016–17 American Athletic Conference men's basketball standings
	Conf.				Overall
Team	W		L	PCT	W		L	PCT
No. 11 SMU †	17	–	1	.944	30	–	5	.857
No. 18 Cincinnati	16	–	2	.889	30	–	6	.833
Houston	12	–	6	.667	21	–	11	.656
UCF	11	–	7	.611	24	–	12	.667
Memphis	9	–	9	.500	19	–	13	.594
UConn	9	–	9	.500	16	–	17	.485
Tulsa	8	–	10	.444	15	–	17	.469
Temple	7	–	11	.389	16	–	16	.500
East Carolina	6	–	12	.333	15	–	18	.455
Tulane	3	–	15	.167	6	–	25	.194
South Florida	1	–	17	.056	7	–	23	.233
† 2017 AAC tournament winner Rankings from AP poll

The 2016–17 UConn Huskies men's basketball team represented the University of Connecticut in the 2016–17 NCAA Division I men's basketball season. The Huskies were led by fifth-year head coach Kevin Ollie. The Huskies split their home games between the XL Center in Hartford, Connecticut, and the Harry A. Gampel Pavilion on the UConn campus in Storrs, Connecticut. The Huskies were members of the American Athletic Conference.

UConn finished the season 16–17, 9–9 in AAC play to finish in a tie for fifth place. They defeated South Florida and Houston to advance to the semifinals of the AAC tournament where they lost to Cincinnati.

== Previous season ==
The Huskies finished the 2015–16 season 25–11, 11–7 in AAC play to finish in sixth place. The Huskies won the AAC tournament as the fifth seed, defeating Cincinnati and Temple to reach the championship game. They defeated Memphis in the championship. The Huskies received a No. 9 seed in the NCAA tournament and defeated No. 8 seed Colorado in the First Round before losing to No. 1 seed Kansas in the Second Round.

== Departures ==
Name	Number	Pos.	Height	Weight	Year	Hometown	Notes
Phillip Nolan	0	PF	6'10"	237	Senior	Milwaukee, WI	Graduated
Sterling Gibbs	4	PG	6'2"	185	Graduate Student	Scotch Plains, NJ	Graduated
Daniel Hamilton	5	SF	6'7"	190	Sophomore	Los Angeles, CA	Declared to 2016 NBA draft
Sam Cassell Jr.	10	PG	6'4"	192	RS Junior	Baltimore, MD	Transferred to Iona
Omar Calhoun	21	SG	6'5"	205	Senior	Brooklyn, NY	Graduated
Nnamdi Amilo	23	PF	6'3"	225	Senior	New Fairfield, CT	Graduated
Shonn Miller	32	PF	6'7"	210	Graduate Student	Euclid, OH	Graduated

== Recruits ==
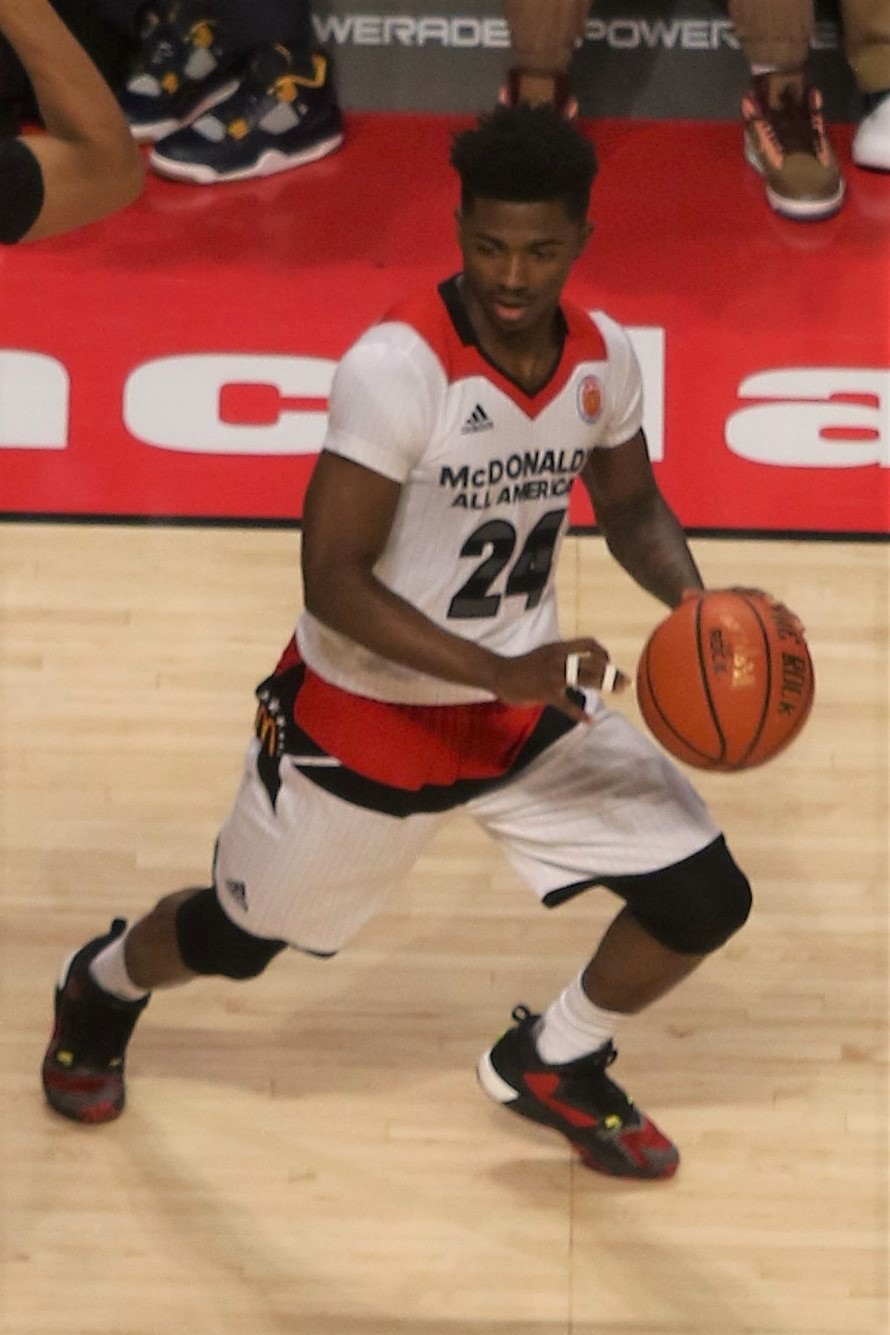
Alterique Gilbert at the 2016 McDonald's All-American Game

College recruiting information
Name	Hometown	School	Height	Weight	Commit date
Alterique Gilbert; PG	Lithonia, GA	Miller Grove	6 ft 0 in (1.83 m)	170 lb (77 kg)	Jul 4, 2015
Alterique Gilbert; PG	Recruit ratings: Scout: Rivals: 247Sports: ESPN: (89)				
Juwan Durham; PF	Tampa, FL	Tampa Preparatory	6 ft 9 in (2.06 m)	200 lb (91 kg)	Sep 1, 2015
Juwan Durham; PF	Recruit ratings: Scout: Rivals: 247Sports: ESPN: (88)				
Vance Jackson; SF	Napa, CA	Prolific Prep	6 ft 8 in (2.03 m)	215 lb (98 kg)	Oct 16, 2015
Vance Jackson; SF	Recruit ratings: Scout: Rivals: 247Sports: ESPN: (82)				
Mamadou Diarra; PF	Queens, NY	Putnam Science Academy	6 ft 8 in (2.03 m)	215 lb (98 kg)	May 22, 2015
Mamadou Diarra; PF	Recruit ratings: Scout: Rivals: 247Sports: ESPN: (82)				
Christian Vital; SG	Queens Village, NY	St. Thomas More	6 ft 2 in (1.88 m)	175 lb (79 kg)	Apr 29, 2016
Christian Vital; SG	Recruit ratings: Scout: Rivals: 247Sports: ESPN: (77)				
Overall recruit ranking: Scout: 8 Rivals: 9 247Sports: 6 ESPN: 9
Note: In many cases, Scout, Rivals, 247Sports, On3, and ESPN may conflict in their listings of height and weight.; In these cases, the average was taken. ESPN grades are on a 100-point scale.; Sources: "2016 Connecticut Basketball Commitment List". Rivals.; "2016 Connecticut Basketball Recruiting Prospects". Scout.; "2016 Connecticut Recruits". ESPN.; "Scout.com Team Recruiting Rankings". Scout.; "2016 Team Ranking". Rivals.

== Roster ==
2016–17 UConn Huskies men's basketball team
Players
Coaches

Pos.	#	Name	Height	Weight	Year	Previous school	Hometown
SG	1	Christian Vital	6 ft 2 in (1.88 m)	178 lb (81 kg)	Fr	St. Thomas More	Queens, NY
PG	2	Jalen Adams	6 ft 3 in (1.91 m)	195 lb (88 kg)	So	Brewster Academy	Roxbury, MA
PG	3	Alterique Gilbert (injured) (redshirt)	6 ft 0 in (1.83 m)	175 lb (79 kg)	Fr	Miller Grove	Lithonia, GA
SF	5	Vance Jackson	6 ft 8 in (2.03 m)	229 lb (104 kg)	Fr	Prolific Prep	Napa, CA
PF	12	Kentan Facey	6 ft 10 in (2.08 m)	227 lb (103 kg)	Sr	Long Island (NY) Lutheran	Trelawny, Jamaica
C	13	Steven Enoch	6 ft 11 in (2.11 m)	258 lb (117 kg)	So	St. Thomas More	Norwalk, CT
SG	15	Rodney Purvis	6 ft 4 in (1.93 m)	205 lb (93 kg)	RS Sr	North Carolina State University	Raleigh, NC
PF	21	Mamadou Diarra (injured) (redshirt)	6 ft 8 in (2.03 m)	215 lb (98 kg)	Fr	Putnam Science Academy	Queens, NY
SF	22	Terry Larrier (injured)	6 ft 8 in (2.03 m)	192 lb (87 kg)	RS So	Virginia Commonwealth University	Bronx, NY
PF	23	Juwan Durham	6 ft 11 in (2.11 m)	207 lb (94 kg)	Fr	Tampa Preparatory School	Tampa, FL
PF	24	Christian Foxen (W)	6 ft 8 in (2.03 m)	227 lb (103 kg)	Jr	South Kent Prep	Rocky Hill, CT
SG	31	Michael Noyes	6 ft 0 in (1.83 m)	186 lb (84 kg)	Sr	Granby Memorial	Granby, CT
G	33	Restinel Lomotey (W)	6 ft 3 in (1.91 m)	198 lb (90 kg)	Jr	Branford	Branford, CT
C	35	Amida Brimah	7 ft 0 in (2.13 m)	230 lb (104 kg)	Sr	Archbishop Coleman F. Carroll	Accra, Ghana
G	45	Omotayo Aiyegbusi (W)	6 ft 4 in (1.93 m)	200 lb (91 kg)	Fr	Saint Joseph's	Philadelphia, PA
G	20	Nieko Labbadia (W)	6 ft 4 in (1.93 m)	215 lb (98 kg)	Sr	Farmington	Farmington, CT

Head coach

- Kevin Ollie

Assistant coach(es)

- Glen Miller
- Ricky Moore
- Dwayne Killings

Legend

- (C) Team captain
- (S) Suspended
- (I) Ineligible
- (W) Walk-on
- Injured
- Current redshirt

Roster
Last update: 8/1/16

== Schedule and results ==
Date time, TV	Rank^{#}	Opponent^{#}	Result	Record	High points	High rebounds	High assists	Site (attendance) city, state
Exhibition
10/30/2016*; 1:00 pm, HuskyVision	No. 18	New Haven	W 83–68		15 – Jackson	7 – Larrier	5 – Gilbert	XL Center (5,826); Hartford, CT
11/05/2016*; 1:00 pm, HuskyVision	No. 18	Southern Connecticut	W 94–65		19 – Purvis	6 – Adams	6 – Gilbert	Harry A. Gampel Pavilion (6,305); Storrs, CT
Regular season
11/11/2016*; 7:00 pm, SNY	No. 18	Wagner	L 58–67	0–1	19 – Larrier	7 – Larrier	5 – Adams	Harry A. Gampel Pavilion (9,523); Storrs, CT
11/14/2016*; 7:00 pm, SNY		Northeastern	L 61–64	0–2	17 – Larrier	7 – Brimah	3 – Tied	Harry A. Gampel Pavilion (7,573); Storrs, CT
11/17/2016*; 10:00 pm, SNY		at Loyola Marymount	W 65–62	1–2	14 – Larrier	10 – Brimah	5 – Tied	Gersten Pavilion (3,421); Los Angeles, CA
11/21/2016*; 9:00 pm, ESPNU		vs. Oklahoma State; Maui Invitational quarterfinals	L 90–98	1–3	34 – Adams	6 – Tied	6 – Adams	Lahaina Civic Center (2,400); Maui, HI
11/22/2016*; 3:30 pm, ESPN2		vs. Chaminade; Maui Invitational 2nd round consolation	W 93–82	2–3	25 – Adams	9 – Adams	11 – Adams	Lahaina Civic Center (2,400); Maui, HI
11/23/2016*; 4:30 pm, ESPN2		vs. No. 13 Oregon; Maui Invitational 5th place game	L 69–79	2–4	27 – Adams	5 – Brimah	5 – Adams	Lahaina Civic Center (2,400); Maui, HI
11/30/2016*; 7:00 pm, SNY		Boston University	W 51–49	3–4	13 – Vital	7 – Facey	6 – Purvis	XL Center (8,183); Hartford, CT
12/05/2016*; 7:00 pm, ESPN2		vs. Syracuse; Tire Pro Classic/Rivalry	W 52–50	4–4	21 – Purvis	13 – Facey	7 – Adams	Madison Square Garden (15,347); New York, NY
12/10/2016*; 6:00 pm, BTN		at Ohio State	L 60–64	4–5	19 – Adams	6 – Tied	3 – Tied	Value City Arena (12,313); Columbus, OH
12/18/2016*; 1:00 pm, SNY		North Florida	W 80–59	5–5	20 – Facey	9 – Facey	10 – Adams	Harry A. Gampel Pavilion (7,110); Storrs, CT
12/23/2016*; 2:30 pm, ESPN2		Auburn	L 67–70 ^{OT}	5–6	20 – Purvis	14 – Facey	4 – Vital	XL Center (12,051); Hartford, CT
12/28/2016; 3:00 pm, ESPN2		Houston	L 46–62	5–7 (0–1)	15 – Vital	7 – Facey	5 – Jackson	XL Center (11,538); Hartford, CT
12/31/2016; 2:00 pm, CBSSN		at Tulsa	L 59–61 ^{OT}	5–8 (0–2)	18 – Adams	9 – Brimah	6 – Adams	Reynolds Center (4,525); Tulsa, OK
01/05/2017; 7:00 pm, ESPN2		at Memphis	L 61–70	5–9 (0–3)	14 – Tied	15 – Brimah	8 – Adams	FedEx Forum (10,227); Memphis, TN
01/08/2017; 5:00 pm, CBSSN		UCF	W 64–49	6–9 (1–3)	17 – Purvis	9 – Facey	7 – Adams	XL Center (8,163); Hartford, CT
01/11/2017; 9:00 pm, CBSSN		Temple	W 73–59	7–9 (2–3)	23 – Facey	10 – Facey	12 – Adams	Harry A. Gampel Pavilion (6,582); Storrs, CT
01/14/2017*; 12:00 pm, FOX		at Georgetown; Rivalry	L 69–72	7–10	22 – Adams	6 – Facey	9 – Adams	Verizon Center (12,164); Washington, D.C.
01/19/2017; 7:00 pm, ESPN2		at SMU	L 49–69	7–11 (2–4)	17 – Jackson	10 – Facey	8 – Adams	Moody Coliseum (6,978); Dallas, TX
01/22/2017; 6:00 pm, CBSSN		East Carolina	W 72–65	8–11 (3–4)	19 – Adams	10 – Facey	5 – Adams	XL Center (5,676); Hartford, CT
01/25/2017; 7:00 pm, ESPNU		at South Florida	W 81–60	9–11 (4–4)	20 – Adams	8 – Brimah	12 – Adams	USF Sun Dome (3,238); Tampa, FL
01/28/2017; 8:00 pm, ESPNU		Tulane	W 78–68	10–11 (5–4)	20 – Facey	12 – Facey	6 – Adams	Harry A. Gampel Pavilion (9,207); Storrs, CT
02/04/2017; 4:00 pm, ESPN2		at No. 14 Cincinnati	L 68–82	10–12 (5–5)	20 – Purvis	6 – Purvis	5 – Adams	Fifth Third Arena (13,428); Cincinnati, OH
02/08/2017; 7:00 pm, CBSSN		South Florida	W 97–51	11–12 (6–5)	23 – Purvis	8 – Brimah	10 – Adams	Harry A. Gampel Pavilion (6,114); Storrs, CT
02/11/2017; 6:00 pm, CBSSN		at UCF	W 66–63	12–12 (7–5)	18 – Purvis	12 – Brimah	7 – Adams	CFE Arena (5,215); Orlando, FL
02/16/2017; 9:00 pm, ESPN2		Memphis	W 65–62	13–12 (8–5)	19 – Adams	10 – Facey	6 – Adams	XL Center (9,631); Hartford, CT
02/19/2017; 4:00 pm, ESPN		at Temple	W 64–63	14–12 (9–5)	18 – Purvis	6 – Facey	5 – Tied	Liacouras Center (8,702); Philadelphia, PA
02/22/2017; 9:00 pm, CBSSN		at Houston	L 70–75	14–13 (9–6)	18 – Adams	11 – Facey	5 – Adams	Hofheinz Pavilion (4,131); Houston, TX
02/25/2017; 12:00 pm, CBS		No. 17 SMU	L 61–69	14–14 (9–7)	15 – Facey	11 – Brimah	2 – 3 tied	XL Center (13,553); Hartford, CT
03/01/2017; 7:00 pm, ESPNU		at East Carolina	L 62–66	14–15 (9–8)	12 – 3 tied	11 – Facey	6 – Adams	Williams Arena (4,354); Greenville, NC
03/05/2017; 12:00 pm, CBS		No. 18 Cincinnati	L 47–67	14–16 (9–9)	15 – Purvis	10 – Facey	4 – Adams	Harry A. Gampel Pavilion (9,331); Storrs, CT
American Athletic Conference tournament
03/09/2017; 8:00 pm, ESPNews	(6)	(11) South Florida; First Round	W 77–66	15–16	30 – Purvis	7 – Brimah	4 – Adams	XL Center (4,874); Hartford, CT
03/10/2017; 9:00 pm, ESPNU	(6)	(3) Houston; Quarterfinals	W 74–65	16–16	23 – Adams	6 – Purvis	5 – Adams	XL Center (7,365); Hartford, CT
03/11/2017; 5:00 pm, ESPN2	(6)	(2) No. 15 Cincinnati; Semifinals	L 71–81	16–17	20 – Adams	9 – Vital	3 – Adams	XL Center (8,117); Hartford, CT
*Non-conference game. ^{#}Rankings from AP Poll. (#) Tournament seedings in parentheses. All times are in Eastern Time. Source:

== Rankings ==
Ranking movements Legend: ██ Increase in ranking ██ Decrease in ranking — = Not ranked RV = Received votes
	Week																		
Poll	Pre	1	2	3	4	5	6	7	8	9	10	11	12	13	14	15	16	17	Final
AP	18	RV	—	—	—	—	—	—	—	—	—	—	—	—	—	—	—	—	Not released
Coaches'	16	RV	RV	—	—	—	—	—	—	—	—	—	—	—	—	—	—	—	—
