= 2016–17 NCAA Division I men's basketball season =

79th season of NCAA Division I Men's Basketball

- Preseason AP No. 1: Duke Blue Devils
- Regular season: November 11, 2016 – March 12, 2017
- NCAA Tournament: 2017
- Tournament dates: March 14 – April 3, 2017
- National Championship: University of Phoenix Stadium; Glendale, Arizona
- NCAA Champions: North Carolina Tar Heels
- Other champions: TCU Horned Frogs (NIT), Wyoming Cowboys (CBI), Saint Peter's Peacocks (CIT)
- Player of the Year (Naismith, Wooden): Frank Mason III, Kansas Jayhawks

The 2016–17 NCAA Division I men's basketball season began on November 11, 2016. The first early-season tournaments were the 2K Sports Classic, Charleston Classic, and Puerto Rico Tip-Off. The season ended with the 2017 NCAA Division I men's basketball tournament, whose Final Four was played at the University of Phoenix Stadium in Glendale, Arizona, on April 1, 2017, followed by the national championship game on April 3. Practices officially began on September 30, 2016.

== Rule changes ==
The only rule change for the regular season was allowing coaches to ask for timeouts in situations of inbounds on offense or defense. Coaches are still not permitted to call timeouts in live-ball situations.

The NCAA approved a number of experimental rule changes for use in the 2017 postseason NIT:

- Team fouls were reset to zero at the 10:00 mark of each half. This effectively divided the game into quarters for purposes of team fouls.
- The "one-and-one" foul shot was not used. Instead, starting with the fifth total foul in each 10-minute period, non-shooting fouls by the defensive team resulted in two free throws, with the only exception being administrative technical fouls. This mirrored foul counting in NCAA women's basketball, which has been played in quarters since the 2015–16 season.
- In a feature unique in the college game, but similar to that used by the NBA and WNBA, each overtime was considered a separate period for purposes of accumulating team fouls. The team foul limit was 3 per overtime period, with all non-shooting team fouls thereafter by the defense resulting in two free throws.
- The shot clock was reset to 20 seconds whenever the ball was inbounded in the frontcourt.

== Season headlines ==
- March 10, 2016 – The Ivy League announced it would add a conference tournament beginning in the 2016–17 season. Previously, the regular season champion earned the automatic berth into the NCAA tournament.
- April 20 – The NCAA announces its Academic Progress Rate (APR) sanctions for the 2016–17 school year. A total of 23 programs in 13 sports are declared ineligible for postseason play due to failure to meet the required APR benchmark, including the following two Division I men's basketball teams:
  - Alcorn State
  - Savannah State
- April 28 – The Atlantic Sun Conference announced that effective with the 2016–17 school year, it would rebrand itself as the ASUN Conference.
- November 2 – The Associated Press preseason All-American team was released. Duke guard Grayson Allen was the leading vote-getter (61 votes). Joining him on the team were California forward Ivan Rabb (55 votes), Villanova guard Josh Hart (53), Oregon forward Dillon Brooks (30) and Iowa State guard Monté Morris (24).
- November 22 – Fort Wayne upset 3rd-ranked Indiana for the first win over a ranked team in the program's history.
- December 5 – The Atlantic Sun Conference (ASUN) announced that North Alabama would move from the Division II Gulf South Conference and join the ASUN in 2018.
- January 2 – Duke announced that head coach Mike Krzyzewski would undergo surgery on January 6 to remove a fragment of a herniated disc in his lower back. He went on a medical leave following the Blue Devils' January 4 game against Georgia Tech and was expected to be out for about four weeks. Associate head coach Jeff Capel took over for Krzyzewski during his recuperation.
- January 5 – Before Austin Peay's game against Tennessee Tech, Peay announced that Dave Loos, the Governors' head coach since 1990, would take a medical leave effective immediately. Loos, who had undergone surgery to remove a malignant tumor from his colon in July 2016, has since been undergoing chemotherapy for a cancerous lymph node found during that procedure. Assistant Jay Bowen served as interim head coach until Loos returned to the sidelines on January 19.
- January 13 – The Western Athletic Conference announced that California Baptist would move from the Division II Pacific West Conference and join the WAC in 2018.
- January 24 – For only the third time since the AP Poll was first compiled for college basketball in 1948, three of the top four teams lost on the same day. First, #2 Kansas lost 85–69 at West Virginia. Shortly thereafter, top-ranked Villanova lost 74–72 at Marquette. Finally, #4 Kentucky lost 82–80 at Tennessee.
- January 26 – The Summit League announced that North Dakota, currently a member of the Big Sky Conference, would join the league in 2018.
- February 4
  - Six teams in the AP Top 10 lose, tying the poll-era record for most losses by top-10 teams in one day. Additionally, it was the first day in poll history in which two of the top three teams (Baylor and Kansas) lost at home to unranked opponents.
  - Krzyzewski returns from his medical leave to the Duke bench, with the Blue Devils defeating Pittsburgh 72–64.
- March 8 – A plane carrying Michigan to the Big Ten tournament in Washington, D.C. skidded off the runway and crashed while trying to take off from Willow Run Airport near Ypsilanti, Michigan. No one was injured, and the team safely arrived in Washington on a flight the following morning.
- March 13 – The Republican of Springfield, Massachusetts reported that a federal lawsuit had been filed against several UMass staff members. The suit was filed in December 2016 by a former girlfriend of assistant Lou Roe, and names Roe and three other staff members, including since-fired head coach Derek Kellogg, as defendants. The suit alleges that she was intimidated and falsely imprisoned in an attempt to keep her silent about doping by team members, domestic violence incidents involving staff members, and quashing of criminal complaints against team members.

=== Milestones and records ===
- During the season, the following players reached the 2000 career point milestone – NJIT guard Damon Lynn, Valparaiso forward Alec Peters, North Florida guard Dallas Moore, Santa Clara guard Jared Brownridge, VMI guard Q. J. Peterson, Winthrop guard Keon Johnson, Northwestern State guard Zeek Woodley, Lehigh center Tim Kempton Jr., Davidson guard Jack Gibbs, Weber State guard Jeremy Senglin, Monmouth guard Justin Robinson, and Texas A&M–Corpus Christi forward Rashawn Thomas.
- November 11 – NJIT's Damon Lynn surpasses Chris Flores as the school's all-time leading scorer for their Division I era.
- January 3 – Jacksonville's Darius Dawkins made 13-of-17 three-pointers en route to 41 points. He set both school and ASUN Conference single game three-point scoring records in the process, which were previously 10 and 11, respectively.
- January 7 – Colorado State head coach Larry Eustachy won his 500th game in Division I. The Rams defeated Air Force 85–58.
- February 11 – Villanova head coach Jay Wright won his 500th game in Division I. The Wildcats defeated Xavier 73–57.
- February 16 – Austin Peay head coach Dave Loos also won his 500th game in Division I. The Governors defeated Eastern Illinois 85–80.
- March 7 – With Gonzaga's 74–56 win over Saint Mary's in the final of the West Coast Conference tournament, the Bulldogs' Przemek Karnowski became the winningest player in NCAA Division I men's history, although the NCAA does not officially recognize this milestone. This was Karnowski's 132nd winning appearance, surpassing the 131 of Duke's Shane Battier. Karnowski would ultimately finish with 137 wins.
- March 9 – John Beilein becomes the winningest coach in Michigan Wolverines men's basketball history (210 wins).
- March 18 – Gonzaga head coach Mark Few reached the 500-win mark in the Bulldogs' 79–73 win over Northwestern in the second round of the NCAA tournament. Among Division I men's coaches, only Adolph Rupp and Jerry Tarkanian reached the milestone in fewer games.

== Conference membership changes ==
Only one school joined a new conference for 2016–17:

School	Former conference	New conference
Coastal Carolina	Big South Conference	Sun Belt Conference

== New arenas ==
- South Dakota opened the new Sanford Coyote Sports Center. The completion of the 6,000-seat venue saw the South Dakota men's basketball, women's basketball, and women's volleyball teams move out of the considerably larger DakotaDome, which remains home to football, track & field, and swimming & diving. The first men's basketball game in the new arena was an exhibition on November 4 against NCAA Division III Loras, with the Coyotes winning 106–76; the first official men's game was the second leg of a November 13 doubleheader with the Coyotes women's team, with the men defeating Bowling Green 78–72.
- North Dakota State opened the renovated Scheels Center. This completion brought the previously outdated Bison Sports Arena up to full Division 1 standards. The arena resumed competition of their men's basketball, women's basketball, and wrestling teams inside the Scheels Center. The renovated arena seats 5,700 people on the North side of NDSU's campus in Fargo, North Dakota. The first game played in the renovated arena was an exhibition on November 2, 2016, against NCAA Division III Concordia College (Moorhead, Minnesota), the Bison winning that game 90–53. The first official men's game was on November 11, 2016; the Bison beat Arkansas State 76–66.

This proved to be the last season for four Division I teams in their then-current venues:

- DePaul, located in Chicago, left its current off-campus home of Allstate Arena in suburban Rosemont, Illinois for a new off-campus arena in the city proper. Wintrust Arena, a 10,000-seat venue at the McCormick Place convention center, opened for the 2017–18 season.
- NJIT left one on-campus venue for another. The aging Fleisher Center (capacity 1,600) was replaced by the Wellness and Events Center (capacity 3,500) for the 2017–18 season.
- Robert Morris closed the Charles L. Sewall Center, the on-campus home to the Colonials since 1985, in June 2017. At the time, the UPMC Events Center was being built at the Sewall Center site and was originally scheduled to open in the middle of the 2018–19 basketball season. The Colonials played most of their 2017–18 home games at PPG Paints Arena in downtown Pittsburgh, with another Pittsburgh venue, Duquesne's A. J. Palumbo Center, used when PPG Paints Arena was not available. Due to construction delays, the Colonials ultimately played their entire 2018–19 home schedule at the Student Recreation and Fitness Center, a facility that opened in 2017 at the on-campus North Athletic Complex as part of the UPMC Events Center project.
- Wofford also moved within its campus, abandoning its home since 1981, Benjamin Johnson Arena (capacity 3,500), for the new Jerry Richardson Indoor Stadium (capacity 3,400).

== Season outlook ==
=== Pre–season polls ===
The top 25 from the AP and USA Today Coaches Polls.

AP
Ranking	Team
1	Duke (58)
2	Kentucky (2)
3	Kansas
4	Villanova (4)
5	Oregon (1)
6	North Carolina
7	Xavier
8	Virginia
9	Wisconsin
10	Arizona
11	Indiana
12	Michigan State
13	Louisville
14	Gonzaga
15	Purdue
16	UCLA
17	Saint Mary's
18	UConn
19	Syracuse
20	West Virginia
21	Texas
22	Creighton
23	Rhode Island
24	Iowa State
25	Maryland

USA Today coaches
Ranking	Team
1	Duke (27)
2	Kansas (1)
3	Villanova (1)
4	Kentucky (2)
5	Oregon (1)
6	North Carolina
7	Virginia
8	Xavier
9	Michigan State
10	Wisconsin
11	Arizona
12	Indiana
13	Gonzaga
14	Louisville
15	Purdue
16	UConn
17	Syracuse
18	West Virginia
19	Saint Mary's
20	UCLA
21	Maryland
22	Texas
23	Creighton
24	Rhode Island
25	Cincinnati

== Regular season ==
=== Early season tournaments ===
Name	Dates	Location	No. teams	Champion
2K Sports Classic	November 17–18	Madison Square Garden (Manhattan, NY)	4	Michigan
Puerto Rico Tip-Off	November 17–18, 20	HP Field House (Lake Buena Vista, FL) (Note: The tournament was originally scheduled to be played at Roberto Clemente Coliseum in San Juan, Puerto Rico, but due to concerns over the Zika virus outbreak, it was moved to the ESPN Wide World of Sports Complex at the Walt Disney World resort near Orlando, Florida.)	8	Xavier
Charleston Classic	November 17–18, 20	TD Arena (Charleston, SC)	8	Villanova
Paradise Jam tournament	November 18–21	Sports and Fitness Center (Saint Thomas, VI)	8	Creighton
Hall of Fame Tip Off	November 19–20	Mohegan Sun Arena (Uncasville, CT)	4	Duke
CBE Hall of Fame Classic	November 21–22	Sprint Center (Kansas City, MO)	4	Kansas
Legends Classic	November 21–22	Barclays Center (Brooklyn, NY)	4	Notre Dame
Gulf Coast Showcase	November 21–23	Germain Arena (Estero, FL)	8	Houston
Maui Invitational	November 21–23	Lahaina Civic Center (Lahaina, HI)	8	North Carolina
Men Who Speak Up Main Event	November 21, 23	MGM Grand Garden Arena (Paradise, NV)	8	Valparaiso
Cancun Challenge	November 22–23	Moon Palace Golf & Spa Resort (Cancun, MX)	8	Georgia State (Mayan Division) Purdue (Riviera Division)
Battle 4 Atlantis	November 23–25	Imperial Arena (Nassau, BAH)	8	Baylor
Great Alaska Shootout	November 23–26	Sullivan Arena (Anchorage, AK)	8	Iona
NIT Season Tip-Off	November 24–25	Barclays Center (Brooklyn, NY)	4	Temple
Las Vegas Invitational	November 24–25	Orleans Arena (Paradise, NV)	4	Butler Bucknell
AdvoCare Invitational	November 24–25, 27	HP Field House (Lake Buena Vista, FL)	8	Gonzaga
Wooden Legacy	November 24–25, 27	Anaheim Convention Center (Anaheim, CA)	8	UCLA
Emerald Coast Classic	November 25–26	Emerald Coast Classic Arena (Niceville, FL)	4	Virginia UTRGV
Barclays Center Classic	November 25–26	Barclays Center (Brooklyn, NY)	4	Maryland
Challenge in Music City	November 25–27	Nashville Music Auditorium (Nashville, TN)	4	Middle Tennessee
Las Vegas Classic	December 22–23	Orleans Arena (Paradise, NV)	4	Southern Cal
Diamond Head Classic	December 22–23, 25	Stan Sheriff Center (Honolulu, HI)	8	San Diego St.

=== Upsets ===
An upset is a victory by an underdog team. In the context of NCAA Division I Men's Basketball, this generally constitutes an unranked team defeating a team currently ranked in the Top 25. This list will highlight those upsets of ranked teams by unranked teams as well as upsets of #1 teams. Rankings are from the AP poll.

Winner	Score	Loser	Date	Tournament
Wagner	67–58	#18 UConn	November 11	
#7 Kansas	77–75	#1 Duke	November 15	Champions Classic
Georgetown	65–61	#13 Oregon	November 21	Maui Invitational
Fort Wayne	71–68	#3 Indiana	November 22	
Colorado	68–54	#22 Texas	November 22	
South Carolina	61–46	#25 Michigan	November 23	
Temple	89–86	#25 Florida State	November 24	NIT Season Tip-Off
Butler	69–65	#8 Arizona	November 25	Las Vegas Invitational
Temple	81–77	#19 West Virginia	November 25	NIT Season Tip-Off
South Carolina	64–50	#18 Syracuse	November 26	
Valparaiso	65–62	#21 Rhode Island	November 29	
Cincinnati	55–54^{OT}	#19 Iowa State	December 1	
#11 UCLA	97–92	#1 Kentucky	December 3	
Providence	63–60	#21 Rhode Island	December 3	
Colorado	68–66	#13 Xavier	December 7	
Indiana State	72–71	#16 Butler	December 7	
UT Arlington	65–51	#12 St. Mary's	December 8	
Iowa	78–64	#25 Iowa State	December 8	
Florida State	83–78	#21 Florida	December 11	
Seton Hall	67–64	#16 South Carolina	December 12	
Clemson	62–60	#22 South Carolina	December 21	
Nebraska	87–83	#16 Indiana	December 28	
St. John's	76–73	#13 Butler	December 29	
Georgia Tech	75–63	#9 North Carolina	December 31	
Virginia Tech	89–75	#5 Duke	December 31	
Minnesota	91–82^{OT}	#15 Purdue	January 1	
Texas Tech	77–76	#7 West Virginia	January 3	
#18 Butler	66–58	#1 Villanova	January 4	
Pittsburgh	88–76	#11 Virginia	January 4	
NC State	104–78	#21 Virginia Tech	January 4	
California	74–73	#25 USC	January 8	
#10 West Virginia	89–68	#1 Baylor	January 10	
Texas Tech	66–65	#25 Kansas State	January 10	
Michigan State	65–47	#24 Minnesota	January 11	
Iowa	83–78	#17 Purdue	January 12	
Utah	86–64	#25 USC	January 12	
Penn State	52–50	#24 Minnesota	January 14	
Oklahoma	89–87	#7 West Virginia	January 18	
Marquette	102–94	#7 Creighton	January 21	
Kansas State	79–75	#7 West Virginia	January 21	
Vanderbilt	68–66	#19 Florida	January 21	
NC State	84–82	#17 Duke	January 23	
Marquette	74–72	#1 Villanova	January 24	
Tennessee	82–80	#4 Kentucky	January 24	
Georgia Tech	78–56	#6 Florida State	January 25	
USC	84–76	#8 UCLA	January 25	
Georgetown	71–51	#16 Creighton	January 25	
Syracuse	82–72	#6 Florida State	January 28	
Miami (FL)	77–62	#9 North Carolina	January 28	
Colorado	74–65	#10 Oregon	January 28	
Georgetown	85–81	#11 Butler	January 28	
Nebraska	83–80	#20 Purdue	January 29	
Kansas State	56–54	#2 Baylor	February 4	
Iowa State	92–89^{OT}	#3 Kansas	February 4	
Oklahoma State	82–75	#7 West Virginia	February 4	
Syracuse	66–62	#9 Virginia	February 4	
Xavier	82–80	#22 Creighton	February 4	
Penn State	70–64	#21 Maryland	February 7	
Alabama	90–86^{4OT}	#19 South Carolina	February 7	
Notre Dame	84–72	#14 Florida State	February 11	
Providence	71–65	#22 Butler	February 11	
Northwestern	66–59	#7 Wisconsin	February 12	
Virginia Tech	80–78^{2OT}	#12 Virginia	February 12	
Texas Tech	84–78	#4 Baylor	February 13	
Arkansas	83–76	#21 South Carolina	February 15	
Seton Hall	87–81	#20 Creighton	February 15	
Michigan	64–58	#11 Wisconsin	February 16	
Pittsburgh	80–66	#17 Florida State	February 18	
Vanderbilt	71–62	#21 South Carolina	February 18	
Miami (FL)	54–48	#18 Virginia	February 20	
Syracuse	78–75	#10 Duke	February 22	
Minnesota	89–75	#24 Maryland	February 22	
Providence	68–66	#23 Creighton	February 22	
Ohio State	83–73	#16 Wisconsin	February 23	
Iowa State	72–69	#9 Baylor	February 25	
Michigan	82–70	#14 Purdue	February 25	
Miami (FL)	55–50	#10 Duke	February 25	
Iowa	83–69	#24 Maryland	February 25	
BYU	79–71	#1 Gonzaga	February 25	
UCF	53–49	#15 Cincinnati	February 26	
Michigan State	84–74	#16 Wisconsin	February 26	
Virginia Tech	66–61	#25 Miami (FL)	February 27	
Wake Forest	88–81	#8 Louisville	March 1	
Iowa	59–57	#22 Wisconsin	March 2	
Vanderbilt	73–71	#12 Florida	March 4	
Seton Hall	70–64	#13 Butler	March 4	
TCU	85–82	#1 Kansas	March 9	Big 12 tournament
Kansas State	70–64	#9 Baylor	March 9	Big 12 tournament
Xavier	62–57	#18 Butler	March 9	Big East tournament
Michigan	74–70^{OT}	#13 Purdue	March 10	Big Ten tournament
Vanderbilt	72–62^{OT}	#17 Florida	March 10	SEC tournament
Northwestern	72–64	#25 Maryland	March 10	Big Ten tournament
Michigan	71–56	#24 Wisconsin	March 12	Big Ten tournament

In addition to the above listed upsets in which an unranked team defeated a ranked team, there were eight upsets by non-Division I teams defeating Division I teams this season. Blue Mountain won two games verus Division I opponents. Bold type indicates winning teams in "true road games"—i.e., those played on an opponent's home court (including secondary homes).

Winner	Score	Loser	Date	Tournament/event
**Louisiana Christian** (NAIA)	85–75	McNeese State	November 15	
**Blue Mountain** (NAIA)	77–74^{3OT}	Arkansas–Pine Bluff	November 21	
Alaska Anchorage (Division II)	74–69	Drake	November 26	2016 Great Alaska Shootout
**Chestnut Hill** (Division II)	76–73	Coppin State	November 28	
**Missouri Western** (Division II)	49–44	SIU Edwardsville	December 10	
**Loyola New Orleans** (NAIA)	69–64	Southern	December 10	
**Blue Mountain** (NAIA)	57–49	Jackson State	December 15	
**Bethesda** (NCCAA Div. I)	100–95	Cal State Northridge	December 17	

=== Conferences ===
==== Conference winners and tournaments ====
Each of the 32 NCAA Division I athletic conferences ended its regular season with a single-elimination tournament. The team with the best regular-season record in each conference received the number one seed in each tournament, with tiebreakers used as needed in the case of ties for the top seeding. The winners of these tournaments received automatic invitations to the 2017 NCAA Division I men's basketball tournament. This was the first season in which the Ivy League held a conference tournament.

Conference	Regular season first place	Conference player of the Year	Conference coach of the Year	Conference tournament	Tournament venue (city)	Tournament winner
America East Conference	Vermont	Trae Bell-Haynes, Vermont	John Becker, Vermont	2017 America East men's basketball tournament	Campus sites	Vermont
American Athletic Conference	SMU	Semi Ojeleye, SMU	Tim Jankovich, SMU	2017 American Athletic Conference men's basketball tournament	XL Center (Hartford, CT)	SMU
ASUN Conference	Florida Gulf Coast	Dallas Moore, North Florida	Joe Dooley, Florida Gulf Coast	2017 ASUN men's basketball tournament	Campus sites	Florida Gulf Coast
Atlantic 10 Conference	Dayton	T. J. Cline, Richmond	Archie Miller, Dayton	2017 Atlantic 10 men's basketball tournament	PPG Paints Arena (Pittsburgh, PA)	Rhode Island
Atlantic Coast Conference	North Carolina	Justin Jackson, North Carolina	Josh Pastner, Georgia Tech	2017 ACC men's basketball tournament	Barclays Center (Brooklyn, NY)	Duke
Big 12 Conference	Kansas	Frank Mason III, Kansas	Bill Self, Kansas	2017 Big 12 men's basketball tournament	Sprint Center (Kansas City, MO)	Iowa State
Big East Conference	Villanova	Josh Hart, Villanova	Chris Holtmann, Butler	2017 Big East men's basketball tournament	Madison Square Garden (New York, NY)	Villanova
Big Sky Conference	North Dakota	Jacob Wiley, Eastern Washington	Brian Jones, North Dakota	2017 Big Sky Conference men's basketball tournament	Reno Events Center (Reno, NV)	North Dakota
Big South Conference	UNC Asheville & Winthrop (Note: Top seed in conference tournament)	Keon Johnson, Winthrop	Nick McDevitt, UNC Asheville	2017 Big South Conference men's basketball tournament	First round: Campus sites Quarterfinals/semifinals: #1 seed Final: Top surviving seed	Winthrop
Big Ten Conference	Purdue	Caleb Swanigan, Purdue	Richard Pitino, Minnesota	2017 Big Ten Conference men's basketball tournament	Verizon Center (Washington, DC)	Michigan
Big West Conference	UC Irvine	Luke Nelson, UC Irvine	Russell Turner, UC Irvine	2017 Big West Conference men's basketball tournament	Honda Center (Anaheim, CA)	UC Davis
Colonial Athletic Association	UNC Wilmington	T. J. Williams, Northeastern	Earl Grant, College of Charleston	2017 CAA men's basketball tournament	North Charleston Coliseum (North Charleston, SC)	UNC Wilmington
Conference USA	Middle Tennessee	JaCorey Williams, Middle Tennessee	Kermit Davis, Middle Tennessee	2017 Conference USA men's basketball tournament	Legacy Arena (Birmingham, AL)	Middle Tennessee
Horizon League	Oakland & Valparaiso	Alec Peters, Valparaiso	John Brannen, Northern Kentucky	2017 Horizon League men's basketball tournament	Joe Louis Arena (Detroit, MI)	Northern Kentucky
Ivy League	Princeton	Spencer Weisz, Princeton	Mitch Henderson, Princeton	2017 Ivy League men's basketball tournament	Palestra (Philadelphia, PA)	Princeton
Metro Atlantic Athletic Conference	Monmouth	Justin Robinson, Monmouth	King Rice, Monmouth	2017 MAAC men's basketball tournament	Times Union Center (Albany, NY)	Iona
Mid-American Conference	Akron (East); Ball State & Western Michigan (West)	Isaiah Johnson, Akron	Keith Dambrot, Akron	2017 Mid-American Conference men's basketball tournament	First round at campus sites Remainder at Quicken Loans Arena (Cleveland, OH)	Kent State
Mid-Eastern Athletic Conference	North Carolina Central	Patrick Cole, North Carolina Central	LeVelle Moton, North Carolina Central	2017 MEAC men's basketball tournament	Norfolk Scope (Norfolk, VA)	North Carolina Central
Missouri Valley Conference	Illinois State & Wichita State	Paris Lee, Illinois State	Dan Muller, Illinois State	2017 Missouri Valley Conference men's basketball tournament	Scottrade Center (St. Louis, MO)	Wichita State
Mountain West Conference	Nevada	Gian Clavell, Colorado State	Larry Eustachy, Colorado State	2017 Mountain West Conference men's basketball tournament	Thomas & Mack Center (Paradise, NV)	Nevada
Northeast Conference	Mount St. Mary's	Jerome Frink, LIU Brooklyn	Jamion Christian, Mount St. Mary's	2017 Northeast Conference men's basketball tournament	Campus sites	Mount St. Mary's
Ohio Valley Conference	Belmont (East); UT Martin (West)	Evan Bradds, Belmont	Rick Byrd, Belmont	2017 Ohio Valley Conference men's basketball tournament	Nashville Municipal Auditorium (Nashville, TN)	Jacksonville State
Pac-12 Conference	Arizona & Oregon	Dillon Brooks, Oregon	Sean Miller, Arizona	2017 Pac-12 Conference men's basketball tournament	T-Mobile Arena (Paradise, NV)	Arizona
Patriot League	Bucknell	Nana Foulland, Bucknell	Nathan Davis, Bucknell	2017 Patriot League men's basketball tournament	Campus sites	Bucknell
Southeastern Conference	Kentucky	Sindarius Thornwell, South Carolina (coaches); Malik Monk, Kentucky (AP)	Mike White, Florida	2017 SEC men's basketball tournament	Bridgestone Arena (Nashville, TN)	Kentucky
Southern Conference	East Tennessee State, Furman, & UNC Greensboro	Devin Sibley, Furman	Niko Medved, Furman	2017 Southern Conference men's basketball tournament	U.S. Cellular Center (Asheville, NC)	East Tennessee State
Southland Conference	New Orleans	Erik Thomas, New Orleans	Mark Slessinger, New Orleans	2017 Southland Conference men's basketball tournament	Leonard E. Merrell Center (Katy, TX)	New Orleans
Southwestern Athletic Conference	Texas Southern	Zach Lofton, Texas Southern	Montez Robinson, Alcorn State	2017 SWAC men's basketball tournament	Toyota Center (Houston, TX)	Texas Southern
The Summit League	South Dakota	Mike Daum, South Dakota State	Craig Smith, South Dakota	2017 Summit League men's basketball tournament	Denny Sanford PREMIER Center (Sioux Falls, SD)	South Dakota State
Sun Belt Conference	Texas–Arlington	Kevin Hervey, Texas–Arlington	Scott Cross, Texas–Arlington	2017 Sun Belt Conference men's basketball tournament	Lakefront Arena (New Orleans, LA)	Troy
West Coast Conference	Gonzaga	Nigel Williams-Goss, Gonzaga	Mark Few, Gonzaga	2017 West Coast Conference men's basketball tournament	Orleans Arena (Paradise, NV)	Gonzaga
Western Athletic Conference	Cal State Bakersfield	Ian Baker, New Mexico State	Rod Barnes, Cal State Bakersfield	2017 WAC men's basketball tournament	Orleans Arena (Paradise, NV)	New Mexico State

==== Conference standings ====
2016–17 American Athletic Conference men's basketball standings
	Conf.				Overall
Team	W		L	PCT	W		L	PCT
No. 11 SMU †	17	–	1	.944	30	–	5	.857
No. 18 Cincinnati	16	–	2	.889	30	–	6	.833
Houston	12	–	6	.667	21	–	11	.656
UCF	11	–	7	.611	24	–	12	.667
Memphis	9	–	9	.500	19	–	13	.594
UConn	9	–	9	.500	16	–	17	.485
Tulsa	8	–	10	.444	15	–	17	.469
Temple	7	–	11	.389	16	–	16	.500
East Carolina	6	–	12	.333	15	–	18	.455
Tulane	3	–	15	.167	6	–	25	.194
South Florida	1	–	17	.056	7	–	23	.233
† 2017 AAC tournament winner Rankings from AP poll

2016–17 America East Conference men's basketball standings
	Conf.				Overall
Team	W		L	PCT	W		L	PCT
Vermont †	16	–	0	1.000	29	–	6	.829
Stony Brook	12	–	4	.750	18	–	14	.563
Albany	10	–	6	.625	21	–	14	.600
New Hampshire	10	–	6	.625	20	–	12	.625
UMBC	9	–	7	.563	21	–	13	.618
UMass Lowell*	5	–	11	.313	11	–	20	.355
Hartford	4	–	12	.250	9	–	23	.281
Binghamton	3	–	13	.188	12	–	20	.375
Maine	3	–	13	.188	7	–	25	.219
† 2017 America East tournament winner * Ineligible for postseason during transition to Division I.

2016–17 Atlantic 10 men's basketball standings
	Conf.				Overall
Team	W		L	PCT	W		L	PCT
Dayton	15	–	3	.833	24	–	8	.750
VCU	14	–	4	.778	26	–	9	.743
Rhode Island †	13	–	5	.722	25	–	10	.714
Richmond	13	–	5	.722	22	–	13	.629
Saint Bonaventure	11	–	7	.611	20	–	12	.625
George Washington	10	–	8	.556	20	–	15	.571
George Mason	9	–	9	.500	20	–	14	.588
La Salle	9	–	9	.500	15	–	15	.500
Davidson	8	–	10	.444	17	–	15	.531
Fordham	7	–	11	.389	13	–	19	.406
Saint Louis	6	–	12	.333	12	–	21	.364
UMass	4	–	14	.222	15	–	18	.455
Saint Joseph's	4	–	14	.222	11	–	20	.355
Duquesne	3	–	15	.167	10	–	22	.313
† 2017 A10 Tournament winner

2016–17 ASUN men's basketball standings
	Conf.				Overall
Team	W		L	PCT	W		L	PCT
Florida Gulf Coast †	12	–	2	.857	26	–	8	.765
Lipscomb	11	–	3	.786	20	–	13	.606
North Florida	8	–	6	.571	15	–	19	.441
USC Upstate	7	–	7	.500	17	–	16	.515
Kennesaw State	7	–	7	.500	14	–	18	.438
Jacksonville	5	–	9	.357	17	–	16	.515
NJIT	3	–	11	.214	11	–	20	.355
Stetson	3	–	11	.214	11	–	21	.344
† 2017 ASUN Tournament winner

2016–17 ACC men's basketball standings
	Conf.				Overall
Team	W		L	PCT	W		L	PCT
No. 5 North Carolina	14	–	4	.778	33	–	7	.825
No. 16 Florida State	12	–	6	.667	26	–	9	.743
No. 14 Notre Dame	12	–	6	.667	26	–	10	.722
No. 10 Louisville	12	–	6	.667	25	–	9	.735
No. 7 Duke †	11	–	7	.611	28	–	9	.757
No. 24 Virginia	11	–	7	.611	23	–	11	.676
Virginia Tech	10	–	8	.556	22	–	11	.667
Miami (FL)	10	–	8	.556	21	–	12	.636
Syracuse	10	–	8	.556	19	–	15	.559
Wake Forest	9	–	9	.500	19	–	14	.576
Georgia Tech	8	–	10	.444	21	–	16	.568
Clemson	6	–	12	.333	17	–	16	.515
NC State	0	–	14	.000	0	–	17	.000[3]
Pittsburgh	4	–	14	.222	16	–	17	.485
Boston College	2	–	16	.111	9	–	23	.281
† 2017 ACC tournament winner Rankings from AP poll

2016–17 Big East men's basketball standings
	Conf.				Overall
Team	W		L	PCT	W		L	PCT
No. 1 Villanova †	15	–	3	.833	32	–	4	.889
No. 21 Butler	12	–	6	.667	25	–	9	.735
Creighton	10	–	8	.556	25	–	10	.714
Seton Hall	10	–	8	.556	21	–	12	.636
Providence	10	–	8	.556	20	–	13	.606
Marquette	10	–	8	.556	19	–	13	.594
Xavier	9	–	9	.500	24	–	14	.632
St. John's	7	–	11	.389	14	–	19	.424
Georgetown	5	–	13	.278	14	–	18	.438
DePaul	2	–	16	.111	9	–	23	.281
† 2017 Big East tournament winner Rankings from AP poll

2016–17 Big Sky men's basketball standings
	Conf.				Overall
Team	W		L	PCT	W		L	PCT
North Dakota †	14	–	4	.778	22	–	10	.688
Eastern Washington	13	–	5	.722	22	–	12	.647
Idaho	12	–	6	.667	19	–	14	.576
Weber State	12	–	6	.667	20	–	14	.588
Montana	11	–	7	.611	16	–	16	.500
Montana State	11	–	7	.611	16	–	16	.500
Sacramento State	9	–	9	.500	13	–	18	.419
Portland State	7	–	11	.389	15	–	16	.484
Northern Colorado*	7	–	11	.389	11	–	18	.379
Northern Arizona	6	–	12	.333	9	–	23	.281
Southern Utah	3	–	15	.167	6	–	27	.182
Idaho State	3	–	15	.167	5	–	26	.161
† Conference tournament winner

2016–17 Big South men's basketball standings
	Conf.				Overall
Team	W		L	PCT	W		L	PCT
Winthrop †	15	–	3	.833	26	–	7	.788
UNC Asheville	15	–	3	.833	23	–	10	.697
Liberty	14	–	4	.778	21	–	14	.600
Gardner–Webb	11	–	7	.611	19	–	14	.576
High Point	9	–	9	.500	15	–	16	.484
Radford	8	–	10	.444	14	–	18	.438
Campbell	7	–	11	.389	19	–	18	.514
Charleston Southern	7	–	11	.389	12	–	19	.387
Longwood	3	–	15	.167	6	–	24	.200
Presbyterian	1	–	17	.056	5	–	25	.167
† 2017 Big South tournament winner

2016–17 Big Ten Conference men's basketball standings
	Conf.				Overall
Team	W		L	PCT	W		L	PCT
No. 15 Purdue	14	–	4	.778	27	–	8	.771
No. 25 Wisconsin	12	–	6	.667	27	–	10	.730
Maryland	12	–	6	.667	24	–	9	.727
Minnesota	11	–	7	.611	24	–	10	.706
No. 23 Michigan †	10	–	8	.556	26	–	12	.684
Northwestern	10	–	8	.556	24	–	12	.667
Michigan State	10	–	8	.556	20	–	15	.571
Iowa	10	–	8	.556	19	–	15	.559
Illinois	8	–	10	.444	20	–	15	.571
Ohio State	7	–	11	.389	17	–	15	.531
Indiana	7	–	11	.389	18	–	16	.529
Penn State	6	–	12	.333	15	–	18	.455
Nebraska	6	–	12	.333	12	–	19	.387
Rutgers	3	–	15	.167	15	–	18	.455
† 2017 Big Ten tournament winner Rankings from AP poll

2016–17 Big West men's basketball standings
	Conf.				Overall
Team	W		L	PCT	W		L	PCT
UC Irvine	12	–	4	.750	21	–	15	.583
UC Davis †	11	–	5	.688	23	–	13	.639
Cal State Fullerton	10	–	6	.625	17	–	15	.531
Long Beach State	9	–	7	.563	15	–	19	.441
Hawai'i	8	–	8	.500	14	–	16	.467
Cal State Northridge	7	–	9	.438	11	–	19	.367
Cal Poly	6	–	10	.375	11	–	20	.355
UC Riverside	5	–	11	.313	7	–	21	.250
UC Santa Barbara	4	–	12	.250	6	–	22	.214
† 2017 Big West tournament winner

2016–17 Big 12 men's basketball standings
	Conf.				Overall
Team	W		L	PCT	W		L	PCT
No. 3 Kansas	16	–	2	.889	31	–	5	.861
No. 13 West Virginia	12	–	6	.667	28	–	9	.757
No. 12 Baylor	12	–	6	.667	27	–	8	.771
No. 16 Iowa State †	12	–	6	.667	24	–	11	.686
Oklahoma State	9	–	9	.500	20	–	13	.606
Kansas State	8	–	10	.444	21	–	14	.600
Texas Tech	6	–	12	.333	18	–	14	.563
TCU	6	–	12	.333	24	–	15	.615
Oklahoma	5	–	13	.278	11	–	20	.355
Texas	4	–	14	.222	11	–	22	.333
† 2017 Big 12 Tournament winner Rankings from AP poll

2016–17 CAA men's basketball standings
	Conf.				Overall
Team	W		L	PCT	W		L	PCT
UNC Wilmington †	15	–	3	.833	29	–	6	.829
College of Charleston	14	–	4	.778	25	–	10	.714
Towson	11	–	7	.611	20	–	13	.606
Elon	10	–	8	.556	18	–	14	.563
William & Mary	10	–	8	.556	17	–	14	.548
Northeastern	8	–	10	.444	15	–	16	.484
Hofstra	7	–	11	.389	15	–	17	.469
James Madison	7	–	11	.389	10	–	23	.303
Delaware	5	–	13	.278	13	–	20	.394
Drexel	3	–	15	.167	9	–	23	.281
† 2017 CAA tournament winner

2016–17 Conference USA men's basketball standings
	Conf.				Overall
Team	W		L	PCT	W		L	PCT
Middle Tennessee †	17	–	1	.944	31	–	5	.861
Louisiana Tech	14	–	4	.778	23	–	10	.697
Old Dominion	12	–	6	.667	19	–	12	.613
UTEP	12	–	6	.667	15	–	17	.469
Rice	11	–	7	.611	23	–	12	.657
Marshall	10	–	8	.556	20	–	15	.571
UAB	9	–	9	.500	17	–	16	.515
Western Kentucky	9	–	9	.500	15	–	17	.469
UTSA	8	–	10	.444	14	–	19	.424
Charlotte	7	–	11	.389	13	–	17	.433
Florida Atlantic	6	–	12	.333	10	–	20	.333
Southern Miss	6	–	12	.333	9	–	22	.290
FIU	3	–	15	.167	7	–	24	.226
North Texas	2	–	16	.111	8	–	22	.267
† 2017 C-USA Tournament winner

2016–17 Horizon League men's basketball standings
	Conf.				Overall
Team	W		L	PCT	W		L	PCT
Oakland	14	–	4	.778	25	–	9	.735
Valparaiso	14	–	4	.778	24	–	9	.727
Green Bay	12	–	6	.667	18	–	14	.563
Northern Kentucky †	12	–	6	.667	24	–	11	.686
Wright State	11	–	7	.611	20	–	12	.625
UIC	7	–	11	.389	17	–	19	.472
Detroit	6	–	12	.333	8	–	23	.258
Cleveland State	5	–	13	.278	9	–	22	.290
Youngstown State	5	–	13	.278	13	–	21	.382
Milwaukee	4	–	14	.222	11	–	24	.314
† 2017 Horizon League Tournament winner

2016–17 Ivy League men's basketball standings
	Conf.				Overall
Team	W		L	PCT	W		L	PCT
x-Princeton †	14	–	0	1.000	23	–	7	.767
Harvard	10	–	4	.714	18	–	10	.643
Yale	9	–	5	.643	18	–	11	.621
Penn	6	–	8	.429	13	–	15	.464
Columbia	5	–	9	.357	11	–	16	.407
Brown	4	–	10	.286	13	–	17	.433
Cornell	4	–	10	.286	8	–	21	.276
Dartmouth	4	–	10	.286	7	–	20	.259
† 2017 Ivy League Tournament winner x – Ivy League champions

2016–17 Mid-American Conference men's basketball standings
	Conf.				Overall
Team	W		L	PCT	W		L	PCT
East
Akron	14	–	4	.778	27	–	9	.750
Ohio	11	–	7	.611	20	–	11	.645
Buffalo	11	–	7	.611	17	–	15	.531
Kent State †	10	–	8	.556	22	–	14	.611
Bowling Green	7	–	11	.389	13	–	19	.406
Miami (OH)	4	–	14	.222	11	–	21	.344
West
Ball State	11	–	7	.611	21	–	13	.618
Western Michigan	11	–	7	.611	16	–	16	.500
Toledo	9	–	9	.500	17	–	17	.500
Eastern Michigan	7	–	11	.389	16	–	17	.485
Northern Illinois	7	–	11	.389	15	–	17	.469
Central Michigan	6	–	12	.333	16	–	16	.500
† 2017 MAC tournament winner

2016–17 MAAC men's basketball standings
	Conf.				Overall
Team	W		L	PCT	W		L	PCT
Monmouth	18	–	2	.900	27	–	7	.794
Saint Peter's	14	–	6	.700	23	–	13	.639
Iona †	12	–	8	.600	22	–	13	.629
Siena	12	–	8	.600	17	–	17	.500
Fairfield	11	–	9	.550	16	–	15	.516
Rider	10	–	10	.500	18	–	15	.545
Canisius	10	–	10	.500	18	–	16	.529
Quinnipiac	7	–	13	.350	10	–	21	.323
Niagara	6	–	14	.300	10	–	23	.303
Marist	5	–	15	.250	8	–	24	.250
Manhattan	5	–	15	.250	10	–	22	.313
† 2017 MAAC tournament winner

2016–17 MEAC men's basketball standings
	Conf.				Overall
Team	W		L	PCT	W		L	PCT
NC Central †	13	–	3	.813	25	–	9	.735
Norfolk State	12	–	4	.750	17	–	17	.500
Morgan State	11	–	5	.688	14	–	16	.467
Hampton	11	–	5	.688	14	–	17	.452
Savannah State*	10	–	6	.625	13	–	16	.448
MD Eastern Shore	9	–	7	.563	14	–	20	.412
South Carolina State	7	–	9	.438	11	–	20	.355
Delaware State	7	–	9	.438	10	–	22	.313
Coppin State	7	–	9	.438	8	–	24	.250
Bethune–Cookman	6	–	10	.375	10	–	22	.313
Howard	5	–	11	.313	10	–	24	.294
Florida A&M	5	–	11	.313	7	–	23	.233
North Carolina A&T	1	–	15	.063	3	–	29	.094
† 2017 MEAC tournament winner *ineligible for postseason due to APR violations

2016–17 Missouri Valley Conference men's basketball standings
	Conf.				Overall
Team	W		L	PCT	W		L	PCT
Illinois State	17	–	1	.944	28	–	7	.800
No. 19 Wichita State†	17	–	1	.944	31	–	5	.861
Northern Iowa	9	–	9	.500	14	–	16	.467
Southern Illinois	9	–	9	.500	17	–	16	.515
Loyola Chicago	8	–	10	.444	18	–	14	.563
Missouri State	7	–	11	.389	17	–	16	.515
Bradley	7	–	11	.389	13	–	20	.394
Evansville	6	–	12	.333	16	–	17	.485
Indiana State	5	–	13	.278	11	–	20	.355
Drake	5	–	13	.278	7	–	24	.226
† 2017 MVC tournament winner Rankings from AP poll

2016–17 Mountain West Conference men's basketball standings
	Conf.				Overall
Team	W		L	PCT	W		L	PCT
Nevada †	14	–	4	.778	28	–	7	.800
Colorado State	13	–	5	.722	24	–	12	.667
Boise State	12	–	6	.667	20	–	12	.625
Fresno State	11	–	7	.611	20	–	13	.606
New Mexico	10	–	8	.556	17	–	14	.548
San Diego State	9	–	9	.500	19	–	14	.576
Wyoming	8	–	10	.444	23	–	15	.605
San Jose State	7	–	11	.389	14	–	16	.467
Utah State	7	–	11	.389	14	–	17	.452
Air Force	4	–	14	.222	12	–	21	.364
UNLV	4	–	14	.222	11	–	21	.344
† Conference tournament winner

2016–17 Northeast Conference men's basketball standings
	Conf.				Overall
Team	W		L	PCT	W		L	PCT
Mount St. Mary's †	14	–	4	.778	20	–	16	.556
LIU Brooklyn	13	–	5	.722	20	–	12	.625
Wagner	11	–	7	.611	16	–	14	.533
Saint Francis	11	–	7	.611	17	–	17	.500
Robert Morris	9	–	9	.500	14	–	19	.424
Bryant	9	–	9	.500	12	–	20	.375
Fairleigh Dickinson	9	–	9	.500	11	–	19	.367
Sacred Heart	8	–	10	.444	13	–	19	.406
Central Connecticut	4	–	14	.222	6	–	23	.207
St. Francis Brooklyn	2	–	16	.111	4	–	27	.129
† 2017 NEC tournament winner

2016–17 Ohio Valley Conference men's basketball standings
	Conf.				Overall
Team	W		L	PCT	W		L	PCT
East
Belmont	15	–	1	.938	23	–	7	.767
Morehead State	10	–	6	.625	14	–	16	.467
Jacksonville State †	9	–	7	.563	20	–	15	.571
Tennessee State	8	–	8	.500	17	–	13	.567
Tennessee Tech	8	–	8	.500	12	–	20	.375
Eastern Kentucky	5	–	11	.313	12	–	19	.387
West
UT Martin	10	–	6	.625	22	–	13	.629
Southeast Missouri St.	9	–	7	.563	15	–	18	.455
Murray State	8	–	8	.500	16	–	17	.485
Austin Peay	7	–	9	.438	11	–	19	.367
Eastern Illinois	6	–	10	.375	14	–	15	.483
SIU Edwardsville	1	–	15	.063	6	–	24	.200
† 2017 OVC tournament winner

2016–17 Pac-12 Conference men's basketball standings
	Conf.				Overall
Team	W		L	PCT	W		L	PCT
No. 9 Oregon	16	–	2	.889	33	–	6	.846
No. 4 Arizona †	16	–	2	.889	32	–	5	.865
No. 8 UCLA	15	–	3	.833	31	–	5	.861
Utah	11	–	7	.611	20	–	12	.625
California	10	–	8	.556	21	–	13	.618
USC	10	–	8	.556	26	–	10	.722
Colorado	8	–	10	.444	19	–	15	.559
Arizona State	7	–	11	.389	15	–	18	.455
Stanford	6	–	12	.333	14	–	17	.452
Washington State	6	–	12	.333	13	–	18	.419
Washington	2	–	16	.111	9	–	22	.290
Oregon State	1	–	17	.056	5	–	27	.156
† Pac-12 Tournament winner Rankings from AP poll

2016–17 Patriot League men's basketball standings
	Conf.				Overall
Team	W		L	PCT	W		L	PCT
Bucknell †	15	–	3	.833	26	–	9	.743
Lehigh	12	–	6	.667	20	–	12	.625
Boston University	12	–	6	.667	18	–	14	.563
Navy	10	–	8	.556	16	–	16	.500
Holy Cross	9	–	9	.500	15	–	17	.469
Loyola (MD)	8	–	10	.444	16	–	17	.485
Colgate	8	–	10	.444	10	–	22	.313
Army	6	–	12	.333	13	–	19	.406
Lafayette	5	–	13	.278	9	–	21	.300
American	5	–	13	.278	8	–	22	.267
† 2017 Patriot League tournament winner

2016–17 Southern Conference men's basketball standings
	Conf.				Overall
Team	W		L	PCT	W		L	PCT
East Tennessee State †	14	–	4	.778	27	–	8	.771
UNC Greensboro	14	–	4	.778	25	–	10	.714
Furman	14	–	4	.778	23	–	12	.657
Chattanooga	10	–	8	.556	19	–	12	.613
Wofford	10	–	8	.556	16	–	17	.485
Mercer	9	–	9	.500	15	–	17	.469
Samford	8	–	10	.444	20	–	16	.556
The Citadel	4	–	14	.222	12	–	21	.364
Western Carolina	4	–	14	.222	9	–	23	.281
VMI	3	–	15	.167	6	–	24	.200
† 2017 SoCon Tournament winner

2016–17 Southland Conference men's basketball standings
	Conf.				Overall
Team	W		L	PCT	W		L	PCT
New Orleans †	13	–	5	.722	20	–	12	.625
Texas A&M–CC	12	–	6	.667	24	–	12	.667
Houston Baptist	12	–	6	.667	17	–	14	.548
Stephen F. Austin	12	–	6	.667	18	–	15	.545
Sam Houston State	10	–	8	.556	21	–	13	.618
Lamar	10	–	8	.556	19	–	15	.559
Southeastern Louisiana	9	–	9	.500	16	–	16	.500
Nicholls State	7	–	11	.389	14	–	17	.452
Abilene Christian*	7	–	11	.389	13	–	16	.448
Northwestern State	7	–	11	.389	13	–	16	.448
Incarnate Word*	7	–	11	.389	12	–	17	.414
Central Arkansas	7	–	11	.389	8	–	24	.250
McNeese State	4	–	14	.222	7	–	22	.241
† 2017 Southland tournament winner * Ineligible for postseason during transition to Division I

2016–17 Southeastern Conference men's basketball standings
	Conf.				Overall
Team	W		L	PCT	W		L	PCT
No. 6 Kentucky †	16	–	2	.889	32	–	6	.842
No. 20 Florida	14	–	4	.778	27	–	9	.750
Arkansas	12	–	6	.667	26	–	10	.722
South Carolina	12	–	6	.667	26	–	11	.703
Ole Miss	10	–	8	.556	22	–	14	.611
Alabama	10	–	8	.556	19	–	15	.559
Vanderbilt	10	–	8	.556	19	–	16	.543
Georgia	9	–	9	.500	19	–	15	.559
Texas A&M	8	–	10	.444	16	–	15	.516
Tennessee	8	–	10	.444	16	–	16	.500
Auburn	7	–	11	.389	18	–	14	.563
Mississippi State	6	–	12	.333	16	–	16	.500
LSU	2	–	16	.111	10	–	21	.323
Missouri	2	–	16	.111	8	–	24	.250
† 2017 SEC tournament winner Rankings from AP poll

2016–17 SWAC men's basketball standings
	Conf.				Overall
Team	W		L	PCT	W		L	PCT
Texas Southern †	16	–	2	.889	23	–	12	.657
Alcorn State*	13	–	5	.722	18	–	14	.563
Grambling State	10	–	8	.556	16	–	17	.485
Jackson State	10	–	8	.556	14	–	18	.438
Southern	10	–	8	.556	15	–	18	.455
Prairie View A&M	10	–	8	.556	13	–	20	.394
Mississippi Valley State	7	–	11	.389	7	–	25	.219
Alabama State	6	–	12	.333	8	–	23	.258
Arkansas–Pine Bluff	6	–	12	.333	7	–	25	.219
Alabama A&M	2	–	16	.111	2	–	27	.069
† 2017 SWAC tournament winner *ineligible for postseason due to APR violations

2016–17 Sun Belt Conference men's basketball standings
	Conf.				Overall
Team	W		L	PCT	W		L	PCT
Texas–Arlington	14	–	4	.778	27	–	9	.750
Georgia State	12	–	6	.667	20	–	13	.606
Arkansas State	11	–	7	.611	20	–	12	.625
Texas State	11	–	7	.611	22	–	14	.611
Georgia Southern	11	–	7	.611	18	–	15	.545
Louisiana–Lafayette	10	–	8	.556	21	–	12	.636
Troy †	10	–	8	.556	22	–	15	.595
Coastal Carolina	10	–	8	.556	20	–	19	.513
South Alabama	7	–	11	.389	14	–	18	.438
Little Rock	6	–	12	.333	15	–	17	.469
Appalachian State	4	–	14	.222	9	–	21	.300
Louisiana–Monroe	2	–	16	.111	9	–	24	.273
† 2017 Sun Belt Conference tournament winner

2016–17 Summit League men's basketball standings
	Conf.				Overall
Team	W		L	PCT	W		L	PCT
South Dakota	12	–	4	.750	22	–	12	.647
North Dakota State	11	–	5	.688	19	–	11	.633
Omaha	9	–	7	.563	18	–	14	.563
Fort Wayne	8	–	8	.500	20	–	13	.606
Denver	8	–	8	.500	16	–	14	.533
South Dakota State †	8	–	8	.500	18	–	17	.514
IUPUI	7	–	9	.438	14	–	18	.438
Western Illinois	5	–	11	.313	8	–	20	.286
Oral Roberts	4	–	12	.250	8	–	22	.267
† 2017 Summit League Tournament winner

2016–17 West Coast Conference men's basketball standings
	Conf.				Overall
Team	W		L	PCT	W		L	PCT
No. 2 Gonzaga †	17	–	1	.944	37	–	2	.949
No. 22 Saint Mary's	16	–	2	.889	29	–	5	.853
BYU	12	–	6	.667	22	–	12	.647
San Francisco	10	–	8	.556	20	–	13	.606
Santa Clara	10	–	8	.556	17	–	16	.515
Loyola Marymount	8	–	10	.444	15	–	15	.500
San Diego	6	–	12	.333	13	–	18	.419
Pepperdine	5	–	13	.278	9	–	22	.290
Pacific	4	–	14	.222	11	–	22	.333
Portland	2	–	16	.111	11	–	22	.333
† Conference tournament winner Rankings from AP poll

2016–17 WAC men's basketball standings
	Conf.				Overall
Team	W		L	PCT	W		L	PCT
Cal State Bakersfield	12	–	2	.857	25	–	10	.714
New Mexico State †	11	–	3	.786	28	–	6	.824
Grand Canyon *	11	–	3	.786	22	–	9	.710
UMKC	8	–	6	.571	18	–	17	.514
Utah Valley	6	–	8	.429	17	–	17	.500
Seattle	5	–	9	.357	13	–	17	.433
Texas–Rio Grande Valley	2	–	12	.143	10	–	22	.313
Chicago State	1	–	13	.071	6	–	26	.188
† 2017 WAC tournament winner * Ineligible for postseason during transition to NCAA Division I.

=== Informal championships ===
Conference	Regular season winner	Most Valuable Player
Philadelphia Big 5	Villanova	Josh Hart, Villanova

Villanova finished with a 4–0 record in head-to-head competition among the Philadelphia Big 5.

=== Statistical leaders ===
Source for additional stats categories

**Points per game**			**Rebounds per game**			**Assists per game**			**Steals per game**		
Player	School	PPG	Player	School	RPG	Player	School	APG	Player	School	SPG
Marcus Keene	C. Michigan	30.0	Ángel Delgado	Seton Hall	13.1	Lonzo Ball	UCLA	7.6	Ehab Amin	Texas A&M-CC	3.44
Chris Clemons	Campbell	25.1	Caleb Swanigan	Purdue	12.5	Austin Luke	Belmont	7.1	Tra-Deon Hollins	Omaha	3.38
Mike Daum	South Dakota St.	25.1	Steve Taylor Jr.	Toledo	12.2	Eric Garcia	Wofford	6.8	Joseph Chartouny	Fordham	3.24
Dallas Moore	N. Florida	23.9	Rokas Gustys	Hofstra	12.1	Kyron Cartwright	Providence	6.7	Laquincy Rideau	Gardner-Webb	3.03
Randy Onwuasor	S. Utah	23.6	Sebastián Sáiz	Ole Miss	11.4	Erick Neal	UT Arlington	6.5	Ahmad Thomas	UNC Asheville	3.00

**Blocked shots per game**			**Field goal percentage**			**Three-point field goal percentage**			**Free throw percentage**		
Player	School	BPG	Player	School	FG%	Player	School	3FG%	Player	School	FT%
Liam Thomas	Nicholls St.	4.2	Devontae Cacok	UNC Wilmington	.800	Markus Howard	Marquette	.547	Phil Forte III	Oklahoma St.	.955
Reggie Lynch	Minnesota	3.5	Justin Patton	Creighton	.676	Nick Masterson	Kennesaw St.	.541	Devin Cannady	Princeton	.938
Ben Lammers	Georgia Tech	3.4	Javier Martinez	UT Martin	.671	Francis Alonso	UNC Greensboro	.462	Donte McGill	FIU	.929
Brandon Gilbeck	W. Illinois	3.0	Aundre Jackson	Loyola (IL)	.669	Corey Allen	Detroit	.448	Andrew Rowsey	Marquette	.926
Tai Odiase	UIC	2.9	Justin Tuoyo	Chattanooga	.645	Jeremy Senglin	Weber St.	.447	Kahlil Dukes	Niagara	.921

=== Attendance ===
Teams which averaged a home attendance of at least 10,000 per game:

Team	Total attendance	Home average
Kentucky	397,148	23,361
Syracuse	367,068	21,592
Louisville	396,333	20,859
North Carolina	293,219	18,326
Maryland	303,676	17,863
Wisconsin	311,166	17,287
Indiana	290,809	17,106
North Carolina State	301,646	16,758
Kansas	279,412	16,436
Creighton	302,887	15,941
Nebraska	277,739	15,429
Arkansas	267,825	14,879
Michigan State	236,752	14,797
BYU	264,588	14,699
Arizona	261,478	14,526
Iowa State	228,326	14,270
Tennessee	227,725	14,232
Virginia	211,671	14,111
Iowa	207,528	13,835
Purdue	245,916	13,662
Marquette	252,858	13,308
Alabama	196,655	13,110
New Mexico	208,492	13,030
Utah	220,959	12,997
Dayton	220,012	12,941
Texas	218,082	12,828
Illinois	165,409	12,723
Ohio State	257,957	12,283
San Diego State	244,190	12,209
Memphis	240,579	12,028
South Carolina	227,911	11,995
Kansas State	214,252	11,902
Michigan	197,398	11,611
UNLV	196,219	11,542
LSU	204,890	11,382
Vanderbilt	178,167	11,135
Wichita State	162,088	10,805
Minnesota	182,006	10,706
West Virginia	158,750	10,583
UConn	177,027	10,413
Xavier	164,501	10,281
California	183,293	10,182
Oklahoma	150,003	10,000

== Postseason ==
=== NCAA tournament ===
==== Tournament upsets ====
For this list, an "upset" is defined as a win by a team seeded 7 or more spots below its defeated opponent.

This definition is based solely on seeding—in the Middle Tennessee–Minnesota game listed below, the #12 seed Middle Tennessee entered the game as a 1.5-point favorite in Las Vegas sports books.

Date	Winner	Score	Loser	Region	Round
March 16	Middle Tennessee (#12)	81–72	Minnesota (#5)	South	First Round
March 18	Wisconsin (#8)	65–62	Villanova (#1)	East	Second Round
March 18	Xavier (#11)	91–66	Florida State (#3)	West	Second Round
March 23	Xavier (#11)	73–71	Arizona (#2)	West	Sweet Sixteen

==== Final Four – University of Phoenix Stadium, Glendale, AZ ====
National Semifinals; April 1
E7	South Carolina	73
W1	Gonzaga	77
MW3	Oregon	76
S1	North Carolina	77

National Championship Game; April 3
W1	Gonzaga	65
S1	North Carolina	71

=== National Invitation tournament ===
After the NCAA tournament field was announced, the NCAA invited 32 teams to participate in the National Invitation Tournament. The tournament began on March 14, 2017, with all games prior to the semifinals being played at campus sites.

==== NIT Semifinals and Final ====
Played at Madison Square Garden in New York City on March 28 and 30

Semifinals; March 28
6	Georgia Tech	76
8	Cal State Bakersfield	61
4	UCF	53
4	TCU	68

Championship game March 30
6	Georgia Tech	56
4	TCU	88

=== College Basketball Invitational ===
The tenth College Basketball Invitational (CBI) Tournament began on March 14, 2017. This tournament features 16 teams who were left out of the NCAA tournament and NIT.

Semifinals; March 22
UIC	78
Coastal Carolina	89
Utah Valley	68
Wyoming	74

Championship Series; March 27, 29, 31
Coastal Carolina	91	57	59
Wyoming	81	81	83

=== CollegeInsider.com Postseason tournament ===
The seventh CollegeInsider.com Postseason Tournament began on March 13, 2017, and ended with the championship game on March 31. This tournament places an emphasis on selecting successful teams from "mid-major" conferences who were left out of the NCAA tournament and NIT. 26 teams participate in this tournament.

Semifinals; March 29
Texas A&M–Corpus Christi	79
UMBC	61
Furman	51
Saint Peter's	77

Championship; March 31
Texas A&M–Corpus Christi	61
Saint Peter's	62

== Award winners ==
=== 2017 Consensus All-America team ===
Consensus First Team
Player	Position	Class	Team
Lonzo Ball	PG	Freshman	UCLA
Josh Hart	SG	Senior	Villanova
Justin Jackson	SF	Junior	North Carolina
Frank Mason III	PG	Senior	Kansas
Caleb Swanigan	PF	Sophomore	Purdue

Consensus Second Team
Player	Position	Class	Team
Dillon Brooks	SF	Junior	Oregon
Luke Kennard	SG	Sophomore	Duke
Malik Monk	SG	Freshman	Kentucky
Johnathan Motley	PF	Junior	Baylor
Nigel Williams-Goss	PG	Junior	Gonzaga

=== Major player of the year awards ===
- Wooden Award: Frank Mason III, Kansas
- Naismith Award: Frank Mason III, Kansas
- Associated Press Player of the Year: Frank Mason III, Kansas
- NABC Player of the Year: Frank Mason III, Kansas
- Oscar Robertson Trophy (USBWA): Frank Mason III, Kansas
- Sporting News Player of the Year: Frank Mason III, Kansas

=== Major freshman of the year awards ===
- Wayman Tisdale Award (USBWA): Lonzo Ball, UCLA
- NABC Freshman of the Year: Lonzo Ball, UCLA
- Sporting News Freshman of the Year: Lonzo Ball, UCLA

=== Major coach of the year awards ===
- Associated Press Coach of the Year: Mark Few, Gonzaga
- Henry Iba Award (USBWA): Mark Few, Gonzaga
- NABC Coach of the Year: Mark Few, Gonzaga
- Naismith College Coach of the Year: Mark Few, Gonzaga
- Sporting News Coach of the Year: Mark Few, Gonzaga

=== Other major awards ===
- Bob Cousy Award (Best point guard): Frank Mason III, Kansas
- Jerry West Award (Best shooting guard): Malik Monk, Kentucky
- Julius Erving Award (Best small forward): Josh Hart, Villanova
- Karl Malone Award (Best power forward): Johnathan Motley, Baylor
- Kareem Abdul-Jabbar Award (Best center): Przemek Karnowski, Gonzaga
- Pete Newell Big Man Award (Best big man): Caleb Swanigan, Purdue
- NABC Defensive Player of the Year: Jevon Carter, West Virginia
- Senior CLASS Award (top senior): Josh Hart, Villanova
- Robert V. Geasey Trophy (Top player in Philadelphia Big 5): Josh Hart, Villanova
- Haggerty Award (Top player in New York City metro area): Ángel Delgado, Seton Hall
- Ben Jobe Award (Top minority coach): Jamion Christian, Mount St. Mary's
- Hugh Durham Award (Top mid-major coach): Rod Barnes, Cal State Bakersfield
- Jim Phelan Award (Top head coach): Frank Martin, South Carolina
- Lefty Driesell Award (Top defensive player): Jevon Carter, West Virginia
- Lou Henson Award (Top mid-major player): Justin Robinson, Monmouth
- Lute Olson Award (Top non-freshman or transfer player): Caleb Swanigan, Purdue
- Skip Prosser Man of the Year Award (Coach with moral character): Danny Manning, Wake Forest
- Academic All-American of the Year (Top scholar-athlete): Canyon Barry, Florida
- Elite 90 Award (Top GPA among upperclass players at Final Four): Nigel Williams-Goss, Gonzaga
- USBWA Most Courageous Award: Bronson Koenig, Wisconsin

== Coaching changes ==
49 teams changed coaches during and after the season.

Team	Former coach	Interim coach	New coach	Reason
Akron	Keith Dambrot		John Groce	Dambrot, the program's all-time winningest head coach with 305 wins, left his alma mater on March 27 after 13 seasons to take the Duquesne head coaching job. The Zips hired former Ohio and Illinois head coach Groce on April 5.
Alabama A&M	Willie Hayes		Donnie Marsh	Hayes resigned from his alma mater on March 7 after six seasons, in which the Bulldogs went 54–121 overall and never finished in the top four of the SWAC standings, capped off by a 2–27 record this season. Texas Southern assistant and former Florida International head coach Marsh was tapped to fill the role on April 12.
Arkansas State	Grant McCasland		Mike Balado	McCasland left Arkansas State on March 13 after one season for the North Texas job. The Red Wolves hired Louisville assistant Balado on March 19.
Austin Peay	Dave Loos		Matt Figger	Peay announced on March 2 that Loos, 70, would retire after 27 seasons at APSU, which was followed by a press conference on March 6. As noted previously in this page, Loos had been undergoing chemotherapy for colon cancer during the season and took a brief medical leave from the team in January. He retired as the winningest men's head coach in Ohio Valley Conference history with 421 wins in the OVC. The Governors hired South Carolina assistant Figger on April 3, just 2 days after the Gamecocks were eliminated by Gonzaga in the Final Four.
Bethune–Cookman	Gravelle Craig		Ryan Ridder	Craig was fired on March 20 after six seasons at Bethune-Cookman, finishing with an overall record of 74–123 and one winning season. On March 31, the Wildcats hired Ridder from Daytona State of the NJCAA.
Butler	Chris Holtmann		LaVall Jordan	Holtmann left Butler on June 9 after three seasons for the Ohio State opening. On June 13, the school hired former Bulldog player Jordan, who spent the past season as the head coach of Milwaukee.
California	Cuonzo Martin		Wyking Jones	Martin left Cal on March 15 after three seasons to take the open head coaching job at Missouri. The Golden Bears promoted assistant Jones on March 24.
Chattanooga	Matt McCall		Lamont Paris	McCall left Chattanooga on March 29 after 2 seasons to take the head coaching job at UMass. The Mocs hired Wisconsin assistant Paris on April 2.
Cleveland State	Gary Waters		Dennis Felton	The 65-year-old Waters announced his retirement on March 7 after 11 seasons at Cleveland State and 21 overall. He leaves as the winningest coach in program history with 194 wins. On March 24, the Vikings hired Tulsa assistant Felton, who had previously been a Division I head coach at Western Kentucky and Georgia.
Coppin State	Michael Grant		Juan Dixon	Grant was fired from Coppin State on March 20 after three seasons, finishing 25–69. Baltimore native and former Maryland All-American Dixon was hired by the Eagles to replace Grant on April 22.
Dayton	Archie Miller		Anthony Grant	Miller left Dayton on March 25 after 6 seasons for the Indiana opening. On March 30, Dayton hired Oklahoma City Thunder assistant coach and ex-Flyer player Grant, who previously had head coaching jobs at VCU and Alabama.
Drake	Ray Giacoletti	Jeff Rutter	Niko Medved	Giacoletti resigned midway into his 4th season at Drake on December 6 after a 1–7 start to the season. Top assistant Rutter assumed head coaching duties for the remainder of the 2016–17 season. The Bulldogs hired Medved from Furman on March 26, where he had led the Paladins to the Southern Conference regular-season title and claimed conference Coach of the Year honors in 2016–17.
Duquesne	Jim Ferry		Keith Dambrot	Ferry was fired from Duquesne on March 13 after five seasons. The Dukes went 60–97 during his tenure, never finishing higher than 10th in the Atlantic 10, and ended this season 10–22 overall and 3–15 in the conference. Duquesne hired Akron head coach Dambrot for the job on March 27.
Eastern Washington	Jim Hayford		Shantay Legans	Hayford left Eastern Washington on March 29 after 6 seasons for the head coaching job at in-state rival Seattle. The Eagles immediately promoted assistant coach Legans to head coach.
Florida A&M	Byron Samuels		Robert McCullum	Samuels was fired on March 17 after three seasons and a 17–71 overall record at FAMU, including a 7–23 mark this season. The Rattlers hired Oregon assistant and former Western Michigan and South Florida head coach McCullum as the new head coach on May 16.
Furman	Niko Medved	Bob Richey		Medved left Furman on March 26 after 4 seasons for the Drake head coaching job. The Paladins, who had made the CIT Semifinals at the time of Medved's departure, named assistant Richey interim head coach for the remainder of the tournament, and removed the interim tag after the season.
Georgetown	John Thompson III		Patrick Ewing	Thompson was fired on March 23 after 13 seasons at Georgetown. JT3 finished with an overall record of 278–151 at the school, but the Hoyas went 14–18 overall and 5–13 in the Big East this season, and failed to make the NCAA tournament for the third time in the last 4 seasons. On April 3, the school turned to Ewing, a Hall of Fame player for his career at Georgetown and the NBA, who had previously been an assistant with the Charlotte Hornets.
Grambling State	Shawn Walker		Donte Jackson	Walker's contract was not renewed on March 22, ending his 3-year tenure at Grambling State with a 25–68 record, although the Tigers had their best season this year under Walker by finishing in a 4-way tie for 3rd in SWAC play. The school went to the NAIA for their next hire, tabbing Stillman's Jackson as the next head coach on May 12.
Illinois	John Groce	Jamall Walker	Brad Underwood	Groce was fired on March 11 after five seasons at Illinois, finishing 95–75 overall with one appearance in the NCAA tournament and no Big Ten regular-season finishes higher than seventh place. Assistant Walker took over on an interim basis for the team during the NIT, making this their 3rd appearance in the NIT in 4 years. The Illini hired Underwood away from Oklahoma State as the permanent replacement on March 18.
Indiana	Tom Crean		Archie Miller	Indiana fired Crean on March 16 after 9 seasons, following the team's first round loss to Georgia Tech in the NIT. Although Crean made the NCAA Sweet Sixteen three times at IU, his record of 166–135 was the second-worst among Hoosiers coaches with at least 100 games, and the team went 18–16 and failed to make the NCAA tournament this season despite defeating two eventual #1 seeds (Kansas and North Carolina). IU hired Miller from Dayton on March 25.
LIU Brooklyn	Jack Perri		Derek Kellogg	Perri was fired on March 20 after a 77–79 record in five seasons at LIU Brooklyn, although the team won 20 games and finished 2nd in the NEC this year. On April 17, the Blackbirds hired former UMass head coach Kellogg for the job.
LSU	Johnny Jones		Will Wade	Jones was fired from his alma mater on March 10 after five seasons and an overall record of 90–72. The Tigers failed to make the NCAA tournament in 2015–16 despite having #1 NBA draft pick Ben Simmons, and after starting this season 8–2 ended at 10–21, including a 1–17 stretch to finish the season. LSU hired Wade from VCU on March 20, making this Wade's 3rd different head coaching job in 5 years.
Massachusetts	Derek Kellogg		Matt McCall	Kellogg was fired on March 9 after nine seasons and a 155–139 overall record at his alma mater. The Minutemen made the NCAA tournament only once in Kellogg's tenure (in 2014) and finished 15–18 overall and 4–14 in Atlantic 10 play this season. UMass initially hired Winthrop head coach Pat Kelsey on March 21, but he backed out two days later, citing personal reasons. UMass then hired McCall from Chattanooga on March 29.
Miami (OH)	John Cooper		Jack Owens	Cooper was fired on March 10 after five seasons and a 59–100 overall record at Miami, including an 11–21 mark this season. On March 29, the RedHawks hired Owens, who spent the last 6 years as associate head coach at Purdue.
Milwaukee	LaVall Jordan		Pat Baldwin	Jordan left Milwaukee on June 13 after one season to take the head coaching job at his alma mater, Butler. The Panthers tabbed Northwestern assistant Baldwin to fill the vacancy on June 20.
Missouri	Kim Anderson		Cuonzo Martin	Anderson was fired on March 5 effectively after the season, finishing 27–68 overall in his three seasons at his alma mater without an NCAA tournament appearance, capped off with a 7–23 mark and last-place SEC finish this season. The Tigers hired Martin from Cal on March 15, making this Martin's 4th different head coaching job in 10 years.
Morehead State	Sean Woods	Preston Spradlin		Woods resigned midway into his 5th season at Morehead State on December 15 amid an investigation into alleged physical abuse of players. He had been suspended by the school since November 22, and at the time of his resignation was facing charges of misdemeanor battery following incidents during and after the Eagles' November 19 game at Evansville. Assistant coach Spradlin was named interim coach during Woods' suspension, and continued in that role for the remainder of the season following the former's resignation, after which Morehead State removed the interim tag.
NC State	Mark Gottfried		Kevin Keatts	Gottfried was fired on February 16, effective at the end of NC State's season. At the time, he was in his fifth season at NC State and 122–82 overall at the school, but was 14–13 overall and 3–11 in ACC play this season, with the Wolfpack losing each of their last three games by more than 20 points. NC State stayed within its university system for its new hire, luring Keatts from UNC Wilmington on March 17.
New Mexico	Craig Neal		Paul Weir	Neal was fired on March 31, 3 weeks after New Mexico athletic director Paul Krebs had announced that Neal would return next season. In his first season as head coach, Neal led the Lobos to a 27–7 record and an appearance in the NCAA tournament by virtue of winning the Mountain West tournament, but went 49–45 during the next 3 seasons with no postseason appearances. The school hired Weir from in-state rival New Mexico State on April 11.
New Mexico State	Paul Weir		Chris Jans	Weir left NMSU on April 11 after one season for the head coaching job at in-state rival New Mexico. On April 17, the Aggies hired ex-Bowling Green head coach Jans, who spent the last 2 seasons at Wichita State in an administrative role and was promoted to associate head coach of the Shockers 4 days before being hired at NMSU.
North Texas	Tony Benford		Grant McCasland	Benford was fired on March 5 after five seasons and a 62–95 overall record at UNT, capped off by an 8–22 overall record and 2–16 record in C-USA play this season. The Mean Green filled the vacancy with Arkansas State head coach McCasland on March 13.
Ohio State	Thad Matta		Chris Holtmann	Matta was fired on June 5 after 13 seasons at OSU. He left as the program's winningest coach with 337 wins, but this season, in which the Buckeyes finished 17–15 overall, was the first time during Matta's tenure that the team did not win at least 20 games, and the first time since Matta's first season at Ohio State in 2005 to miss the postseason altogether. The school hired Butler's Holtmann as their new head coach on June 9.
Oklahoma State	Brad Underwood		Mike Boynton	Underwood left Oklahoma State on March 18 after one season for the Illinois opening. The Cowboys stayed in-house to fill the vacancy, promoting assistant Boynton on March 24.
Oral Roberts	Scott Sutton		Paul Mills	Oral Roberts parted ways with Sutton on April 10 after 18 seasons. Sutton finishes as the school's all-time winningest head coach with 328 wins, but the Golden Eagles finished 8–22 overall and last in The Summit League this season. ORU hired Baylor assistant Mills as their new head coach on April 28.
Portland State	Tyler Geving		Barret Peery	Portland State parted ways with Geving on March 15 after 8 seasons, finishing with a 112–133 record. The Vikings hired Santa Clara associate head coach and former Portland State assistant Peery on April 10.
Presbyterian	Gregg Nibert		Dustin Kerns	Nibert resigned from Presbyterian on April 12 after 28 seasons. Nibert left as the school's winningest head coach with 419 wins, but the Blue Hose had gone 86–218 since making the transition to Division I in 2007. The school hired Wofford associate head coach Kerns as the next head coach on May 23.
Quinnipiac	Tom Moore		Baker Dunleavy	Moore was fired on March 7 after 10 seasons and an overall record of 162–150 at Quinnipiac. In his final two seasons, the Bobcats went 9–21 and 10–21. Quinnipiac hired top Villanova assistant Baker Dunleavy, son of former Tulane head coach Mike Dunleavy Sr. and brother of NBA veteran Mike Dunleavy Jr. on March 27.
Rice	Mike Rhoades		Scott Pera	Rhoades left Rice on March 21 after three seasons for the head coaching job at VCU, where he served as associate head coach under Shaka Smart from 2009 to 2014 before taking the Rice job. 2 days later, the Owls named top assistant Pera as Rhoades' replacement.
San Diego State	Steve Fisher		Brian Dutcher	According to multiple sources, the 72-year-old Fisher made the decision to retire on April 10 after 18 seasons at San Diego State, which he confirmed the following day. He leaves the Aztecs as the program's winningest head coach with 386 wins. Dutcher, who had been an assistant under Fisher throughout his tenure at SDSU and also at Fisher's previous coaching stop at Michigan, took over as Fisher's designated successor.
San Jose State	Dave Wojcik		Jean Prioleau	Wojcik resigned from San Jose State on July 10 citing personal reasons, finishing 32–90 overall in 4 seasons with the Spartans. Colorado assistant Prioleau was named head coach on August 4.
Seattle	Cameron Dollar		Jim Hayford	Dollar was fired on March 13 after 8 seasons at Seattle with a record of 107–138. The Redhawks hired Heyford from in-state rival Eastern Washington on March 29.
Southern	Roman Banks	Morris Scott	Sean Woods	Banks, who had just completed his 6th season as Southern's head coach, was named the new long-term Athletic Director of the school on March 31. He had been serving as the interim AD of Southern for the past two years. Associate HC Scott was promoted to interim head coach for the 2017-18 season. On April 12, 2018, Stetson assistant coach Woods was named full-time head coach of the Jaguars.
South Florida	Orlando Antigua	Murry Bartow	Brian Gregory	Antigua struggled during his 2 ½ seasons at USF, and after a 6–7 start to the season against the backdrop of an academic fraud investigation, he was fired on January 3. Assistant Bartow was named interim head coach for the remainder of the season. After the season, the Bulls hired Gregory on March 14, one year following his departure from Georgia Tech.
UC Santa Barbara	Bob Williams		Joe Pasternack	Williams, the program's all-time winningest coach with 313 wins, was fired on March 9 after a 6–22 season, his worst season in his 19-year tenure at UCSB. The Gauchos hired Arizona associate head coach and former New Orleans head coach Pasternack on March 30.
UNC Wilmington	Kevin Keatts		C. B. McGrath	Keatts left Wilmington on March 17 after 3 seasons for the NC State opening. The Seahawks hired ex-Kansas player and North Carolina assistant McGrath on April 4.
USC Upstate	Eddie Payne	Kyle Perry		Citing complications from surgeries on both of his ankles during the off-season, the 66-year-old Payne announced his retirement on October 3, 2017, after 15 seasons at USC Upstate and 32 overall as head coach. Associate head coach Perry was initially named interim head coach of the Spartans, but had the interim tag removed on October 20 and was named full-time head coach.
VCU	Will Wade		Mike Rhoades	Wade left VCU on March 20 after two seasons to take the LSU head coaching job. The Rams brought back former assistant Rhoades the next day, this time as head coach.
Washington	Lorenzo Romar		Mike Hopkins	Romar was fired on March 15 after 15 seasons at Washington. Romar finished with an overall record of 298–195 at his alma mater, but this season, in which the Huskies finished 9–22 overall and 2–16 in Pac-12 play, was the sixth straight year in which the team failed to make the NCAA tournament, despite featuring two first-round NBA draft picks in 2015–16 (Marquese Chriss and Dejounte Murray) and the eventual #1 overall draft pick this season in Markelle Fultz. Washington hired Syracuse assistant Mike Hopkins on March 19, who had been designated as Syracuse's head coach-in-waiting when Boeheim retires.
Youngstown State	Jerry Slocum		Jerrod Calhoun	The 65-year-old Slocum announced his retirement on March 7 after 12 seasons at Youngstown State and 42 as an NCAA head coach. He left with 142 wins with the Penguins, the most in the program's Division I history, and 723 overall. Calhoun was hired from Division II Fairmont State on March 25, fresh off the Falcons' loss in the D-II championship game.

== See also ==
- 2016–17 NCAA Division I women's basketball season
