= 2017–18 American Athletic Conference men's basketball season =

- League: NCAA Division I
- Sport: Basketball
- Duration: November 2017 through March 2018
- Teams: 12
- TV partner(s): ESPN, CBS

Regular season
- Season champions: Cincinnati
- Season MVP: Gary Clark, Cincinnati

Tournament
- Champions: Cincinnati
- Runners-up: Houston
- Finals MVP: Gary Clark, Cincinnati

American Athletic Conference men's basketball seasons
- ← 2016–17 2018–19 →

2017–18 American Athletic Conference men's basketball standings
	Conf.				Overall
Team	W		L	PCT	W		L	PCT
No. 6 Cincinnati †	16	–	2	.889	31	–	5	.861
No. 21 Houston	14	–	4	.778	27	–	8	.771
No. 16 Wichita State	14	–	4	.778	25	–	8	.758
Tulsa	12	–	6	.667	19	–	12	.613
Memphis	10	–	8	.556	21	–	13	.618
UCF	9	–	9	.500	19	–	13	.594
Temple	8	–	10	.444	17	–	16	.515
UConn	7	–	11	.389	14	–	18	.438
SMU	6	–	12	.333	17	–	16	.515
Tulane	5	–	13	.278	14	–	17	.452
East Carolina	4	–	14	.222	10	–	20	.333
South Florida	3	–	15	.167	10	–	22	.313
† 2018 AAC tournament winner Rankings from AP poll

The 2017–18 American Athletic Conference men's basketball season began with practices in October 2017 followed by the start of the 2017–18 NCAA Division I men's basketball season in November. The conference held its media day in October 2017. Conference play begin in December 2017 and concluded on March 3, 2018.

Cincinnati won the regular season championship by two games over Houston and Wichita State. The American Athletic tournament was held at the Amway Center in Orlando, Florida from March 8–11, 2018. Cincinnati also won the AAC tournament championship, defeating Houston in the championship game.

Cincinnati's Gary Clark was named the AAC player of the year while Houston's Kelvin Sampson was named coach of the year.

Cincinnati, Houston, and Wichita State all received bids to the NCAA tournament, but none made it past the Second Round as the conference went 2–3 in the Tournament.

Temple received a bid to the National Invitation Tournament, but lost in the first round.

The season marked the first season with Wichita State as a member of the AAC, having joined on July 1, 2017. As a result, the conference included 12 teams for the first time.

== Head coaches ==
=== Coaching changes ===
South Florida head coach Orlando Antigua was fired after the first 13 games of the 2016–17 season amid academic fraud allegations. Interim head coach Murry Bartow coach was not retained by the school following the season. On March 14, 2017, the school hired Brian Gregory as the next head coach.

=== Coaches ===
Team	Head coach	Previous job	Years at school	Overall record	AAC record	AAC titles	NCAA tournaments	NCAA Final Fours	NCAA Championships
Cincinnati	Mick Cronin	Murray State	12	268–140	72–18	2	8	0	0
Connecticut	Kevin Ollie	Connecticut (asst.)	6	127–79	49–41	2	2	1	1
East Carolina	Jeff Lebo	Auburn	8	124–138	20–52	0	0	0	0
Houston	Kelvin Sampson	Houston Rockets (asst.)	4	81–48	42–32	0	1	0	0
Memphis	Tubby Smith	Texas Tech	2	38–26	19–17	0	0	0	0
SMU	Tim Jankovich	SMU (asst.)	3	58–21	23–13	1	1	0	0
South Florida	Brian Gregory	Michigan State (advisor)	1	10–22	3–15	0	0	0	0
Temple	Fran Dunphy	Penn	12	247–152	46–44	1	7	0	0
Tulane	Mike Dunleavy	Los Angeles Clippers	2	20–42	8–28	0	0	0	0
Tulsa	Frank Haith	Missouri	4	77–52	46–26	0	1	0	0
UCF	Johnny Dawkins	Stanford	2	43–25	20–16	0	0	0	0
Wichita State	Gregg Marshall	Winthrop	11	286–98	14–4	0	7	1	0

Notes:

- Overall and AAC records are from time at current school and are through the end of 2017–18 season. NCAA records include time at current school only.
- AAC records are only from 2013–14 season to present, prior conference records not included.

== Preseason ==
=== Preseason Coaches Poll ===
AAC Media Day took place October 15, 2017, in Philadelphia, Pennsylvania. Cincinnati was picked to win the conference's regular season (seven votes) with Wichita State a close second (five votes).

Rank	Team
1.	Cincinnati (7)
2.	Wichita State (5)
3.	UCF
4.	SMU
5.	Connecticut
6.	Houston
7.	Temple
8.	Tulsa
9.	Memphis
10.	Tulane
11.	East Carolina
12.	USF

first place votes in parentheses

=== Preseason All-AAC teams ===
Honor	Recipient
Preseason Player of the Year	Shake Milton, SMU
Preseason All-AAC First Team
Preseason All-AAC First Team	Shake Milton, SMU
Preseason All-AAC First Team	Jalen Adams, Connecticut
Preseason All-AAC First Team	Rob Gray, Houston
Preseason All-AAC First Team	Landry Shamet, Wichita State
Preseason All-AAC First Team	B. J. Taylor, UCF
Preseason All-AAC Second Team
Preseason All-AAC Second Team	Gary Clark, Cincinnati
Preseason All-AAC Second Team	Junior Etou, Tulsa
Preseason All-AAC Second Team	Jacob Evans, Cincinnati
Preseason All-AAC Second Team	Tacko Fall, UCF
Preseason All-AAC Second Team	Kyle Washington, Cincinnati
Preseason Rookie of the Year	Alterique Gilbert, Connecticut

== Regular season ==
=== Rankings ===
Legend
Increase in ranking
Decrease in ranking
Not ranked previous week

		Pre	Wk 2	Wk 3	Wk 4	Wk 5	Wk 6	Wk 7	Wk 8	Wk 9	Wk 10	Wk 11	Wk 12	Wk 13	Wk 14	Wk 15	Wk 16	Wk 17	Wk 18	Wk 19	Final
Cincinnati	AP	12	12	12	11	17	25	20	21	19	14	12	9	8	6	5	11	10	8	6	
Cincinnati	C	13	13	13	9	17	RV	22	22	20	13	11	8	8	6	5	11	10	8	10	12
Connecticut	AP																				
Connecticut	C																				
East Carolina	AP																				
East Carolina	C																				
Houston	AP						RV						RV	RV	RV	RV	23	25	21	21	
Houston	C						RV							RV	RV	RV	23	RV	21	19	22
Memphis	AP																				
Memphis	C																				
SMU	AP	RV	RV			RV	RV	RV	RV												
SMU	C	RV		RV	RV	RV															
South Florida	AP																				
South Florida	C																				
Temple	AP			RV																	
Temple	C			RV																	
Tulane	AP																				
Tulane	C																				
Tulsa	AP																				
Tulsa	C																				
UCF	AP	RV																			
UCF	C																				
Wichita State	AP	7	6	6	8	6	3	11	8	9	5	7	17	16	22	19	13	11	11	16	
Wichita State	C	8	8	6	8	3	11	10	10	9	5	4	16	16	16	18	12	11	14	16	25

=== Conference matrix ===
	Cincinnati	Connecticut	East Carolina	Houston	Memphis	SMU	South Florida	Temple	Tulane	Tulsa	UCF	Wichita State
vs. Cincinnati	—	0–2	0–1	1–1	0–2	0–2	0–1	0–2	0–0	0–1	0–2	1–0
vs. Connecticut	2–0	—	0–2	0–0	2–0	0–1	0–1	1–0	0–1	2–0	1–1	2–0
vs. East Carolina	1–0	2–0	—	2–0	0–1	2–0	0–2	1–0	1–1	1–0	1–0	1–0
vs. Houston	0–1	0–0	0–2	—	1–0	0–1	0–2	0–2	1–1	0–1	0–1	1–1
vs. Memphis	2–0	0–2	1–0	0–1	—	0–1	0–1	0–1	0–2	1–1	2–0	1–0
vs. SMU	2–0	1–0	0–2	1–0	1–0	—	0–1	1–0	1–1	1–0	1–1	1–1
vs. South Florida	1–0	1–0	2–0	2–0	1–0	1–0	—	1–0	1–1	2–0	2–0	1–0
vs. Temple	2–0	0–1	0–1	2–0	1–0	0–1	0–1	—	1–1	0–1	1–1	1–1
vs. Tulane	0–0	1–0	1–1	1–1	2–0	1–1	1–1	1–1	—	2–0	0–0	1–0
vs. Tulsa	1–0	0–2	0–1	1–0	1–1	0–	0–2	1–0	0–2	—	0–1	2–0
vs. UCF	2–0	1–1	0–1	1–0	0–2	1–1	0–2	1–1	0–0	1–0	—	1–0
vs. Wichita State	1–1	0–2	0–1	1–1	0–1	1–1	0–1	1–1	0–1	0–2	0–1	—
Total	14–2	6–10	4–12	12–4	9–7	6–10	1–15	8–8	5–11	10–6	8–8	13–3

=== Player of the week ===
Throughout the regular season, the American Athletic Conference named a player and rookie of the week.

Week	Player(s) of the week	Rookie of the week
November 13, 2017	Shake Milton, SMU	Ethan Chargois, SMU
November 20, 2017	Melvin Frazier, Tulane	Ceasar DeJesus, UCF
November 27, 2017	Gary Clark, Cincinnati	Fabian White Jr., Houston
December 4, 2017	Shake Milton (2), SMU	Shawn Williams, ECU
December 11, 2017	Landry Shamet, Wichita State	Jamal Johnson, Memphis
December 18, 2017	Jacob Evans, Cincinnati	Ethan Chargois (2), SMU
December 26, 2017	Tacko Fall, UCF	David Nickelberry, Memphis
January 2, 2018	Junior Etou, Tulsa	Ceasar DeJesus (2), UCF
January 8, 2018	Jacob Evans (2), Cincinnati	Ceasar DeJesus (3), UCF
January 15, 2018	Jeremiah Martin, Memphis	Nate Pierre-Louis, Temple
January 22, 2018	Shake Milton (3), SMU Gary Clark (2), Cincinnati	Shawn Williams (2), ECU
January 29, 2018	Gary Clark (3), Cincinnati	Fabian White Jr. (2), Houston
February 5, 2018	Junior Etou (2), Tulsa	Shawn Williams (3), ECU
February 12, 2018	Armoni Brooks, Houston	J. P. Moorman II, Temple
February 19, 2018	Shaquille Morris, Wichita State	Shawn Williams (4), ECU
February 26, 2018	Raynere Thornton, Memphis	Caleb Daniels, Tulane
March 5, 2018	Rob Gray, Houston	David Collins, USF

== Honors and awards ==
=== All-AAC Awards and teams ===
Honor	Recipient
Player of the Year	Gary Clark, Cincinnati
Coach of the Year	Kelvin Sampson, Houston
Scholar-Athlete of the Year	Obi Enechionyia, Temple
Rookie of the Year	Shawn Williams, East Carolina
Defensive Player of the Year	Gary Clark, Cincinnati
Most Improved Player	Melvin Frazier, Tulane
Sixth Man of the Year	Armoni Brooks, Houston
Sportsmanship Award	Gary Clark, Cincinnati
All-AAC First Team
All-AAC First Team	Gary Clark, Cincinnati*
All-AAC First Team	Jacob Evans, Cincinnati
All-AAC First Team	Rob Gray, Houston
All-AAC First Team	Landry Shamet, Wichita State
All-AAC First Team	Shaquille Morris, Wichita State
All-AAC Second Team
All-AAC Second Team	Jalen Adams, Connecticut
All-AAC Second Team	Junior Etou, Tulsa
All-AAC Second Team	Melvin Frazier, Tulane
All-AAC Second Team	Jeremiah Martin, Memphis
All-AAC Second Team	Shake Milton, SMU
All-AAC Honorable Mention
All-AAC Honorable Mention	A. J. Davis, UCF
All-AAC Honorable Mention	Quinton Rose, Temple
All-AAC Honorable Mention	Kyle Washington, Cincinnati
All-Rookie Team
All-Rookie Team	Ethan Chargois, F, SMU
All-Rookie Team	David Collins, G, USF
All-Rookie Team	Nate Pierre-Louis, G, Temple
All-Rookie Team	Fabian White Jr., F, Houston
All-Rookie Team	Shawn Williams, G, ECU*

* Unanimous Selection

== Postseason ==
=== American Athletic Conference tournament ===
First round Thursday, March 8
8	UConn	73
9	SMU	80
5	Memphis	79
12	South Florida	77
7	Temple	82
10	Tulane	77
6	UCF	66
11	East Carolina	52

Quarterfinals; Friday, March 9
1	Cincinnati	61
9	SMU	51
4	Tulsa	64
5	Memphis	67
2	Wichita State	89
7	Temple	81
3	Houston	84
6	UCF	56

Semifinals; Saturday, March 10
1	Cincinnati	70
5	Memphis	60
2	Wichita State	74
3	Houston	77

Championship; Sunday, March 11
1	Cincinnati	56
3	Houston	55

=== NCAA tournament ===
The winner of the AAC tournament, Cincinnati, received the conference's automatic bid to the NCAA tournament.

Seed	Region	School	First Four	First round	Second round	Sweet Sixteen	Elite Eight	Final Four	Championship
2	South	Cincinnati	N/A	defeated (15) Georgia State 68–53	eliminated by (7) Nevada 73–75				
4	East	Wichita State	N/A	eliminated by (13) Marshall 75–81					
6	West	Houston	N/A	defeated (11) San Diego State 67–65	eliminated by (3) Michigan 63–64				
		W–L (%):	0–0 (–)	2–1 (.667)	0–2 (.000)	0–0 (–)	0–0 (–)	0–0 (–)	0–0 (–) Total: 2–3 (.400)

=== NIT ===
Temple received an at-large bid to the NIT.

Seed	Bracket	School	First round	Second round	Quarterfinals	Semifinals	Finals
5	Notre Dame	Temple	eliminated by (4) Penn State 57–63				
		W–L (%):	0–1 (.000)	0–0 (–)	0–0 (–)	0–0 (–)	0–0 (–) Total: 0–1 (.000)

== NBA draft ==
The following list includes all AAC players who were drafted in the 2018 NBA draft.

Player	Position	School	Round	Pick	Team
Landry Shamet	PG	Wichita State	1	26	Philadelphia 76ers
Jacob Evans	SG	Cincinnati	1	28	Golden State Warriors
Melvin Frazier	SF	Tulane	2	35	Orlando Magic
Shake Milton	PG	SMU	2	54	Dallas Mavericks
