= 2017–18 South Florida Bulls men's basketball team =

American college basketball season

2017–18 South Florida Bulls men's basketball
- Conference: American Athletic Conference
- Record: 10–22 (3–15 AAC)
- Head coach: Brian Gregory
- Assistant coaches: Tom Herrion; Chad Dollar; Scott Wagers
- Home arena: USF Sun Dome

2017–18 American Athletic Conference men's basketball standings
| | Conf. | | | | Overall |
| Team | W | | L | PCT | W | | L | PCT |
|---|---|---|---|---|---|---|---|---|
| No. 6 Cincinnati † | 16 | – | 2 | .889 | 31 | – | 5 | .861 |
| No. 21 Houston | 14 | – | 4 | .778 | 27 | – | 8 | .771 |
| No. 16 Wichita State | 14 | – | 4 | .778 | 25 | – | 8 | .758 |
| Tulsa | 12 | – | 6 | .667 | 19 | – | 12 | .613 |
| Memphis | 10 | – | 8 | .556 | 21 | – | 13 | .618 |
| UCF | 9 | – | 9 | .500 | 19 | – | 13 | .594 |
| Temple | 8 | – | 10 | .444 | 17 | – | 16 | .515 |
| UConn | 7 | – | 11 | .389 | 14 | – | 18 | .438 |
| SMU | 6 | – | 12 | .333 | 17 | – | 16 | .515 |
| Tulane | 5 | – | 13 | .278 | 14 | – | 17 | .452 |
| East Carolina | 4 | – | 14 | .222 | 10 | – | 20 | .333 |
| South Florida | 3 | – | 15 | .167 | 10 | – | 22 | .313 |
† 2018 AAC tournament winner Rankings from AP poll

The 2017–18 South Florida Bulls men's basketball team represented the University of South Florida during the 2017–18 NCAA Division I men's basketball season. The season marked the 46th basketball season for USF, the fifth as a member of the American Athletic Conference, and the first season under head coach Brian Gregory. The Bulls played their home games at the USF Sun Dome on the university's Tampa, Florida campus. The Bulls finished the season 10–22, 3–15 in AAC play to finish in last place. As the No. 12 seed in the AAC tournament, they lost in the first round to Memphis.

== Previous season ==
The Bulls finished the 2015–16 season 7–23, 1–17 in AAC play to finish in last place. As the No. 11 seed in the AAC tournament, they lost in the first round to UConn.

The Bulls were led by head coach Orlando Antigua for the first 13 games of the season until he was fired amid academic fraud allegations. Following Antigua's firing, they were led by interim head coach Murry Bartow. On March 14, 2017, the school hired Brian Gregory as the next head coach.

== Offseason ==
=== Departures ===
| Name | Number | Pos. | Height | Weight | Year | Hometown | Reason for departure |
|---|---|---|---|---|---|---|---|
| Jahmal McMurray | 0 | G | 6'0" | 165 | Sophomore | Topeka, KS | Transferred to SMU |
| Mike Bibby Jr. | 10 | G | 6'3" | 175 | Freshman | Phoenix, AZ | Transferred to Appalachian State |
| Jake Bodway | 11 | G | 6'3" | 201 | RS Junior | Bloomington, MN | Walk-on; didn't make the roster |
| Geno Thorpe | 13 | G | 6'4" | 170 | RS Senior | Pittsburgh, PA | Graduate transferred to Syracuse |
| Malik Fitts | 24 | F | 6'8" | 237 | Freshman | Rancho Cucamonga, CA | Transferred to Saint Mary's |
| Ruben Guerrero | 33 | C | 7'0" | 235 | Junior | Marbella, Spain | Transferred to Samford |
| Bo Zeigler | 35 | F | 6'6" | 207 | RS Junior | Detroit, MI | Graduate transferred to George Washington |
| Luis Santos | 42 | F | 6'9" | 266 | Sophomore | Bronx, NY | Transferred to Saint Louis |

=== Incoming transfers ===
| Name | Number | Pos. | Height | Weight | Year | Hometown | Previous School |
|---|---|---|---|---|---|---|---|
| Stephan Jiggetts | 0 | G | 6'1" | 205 | RS Senior | Forestville, MD | Transferred from Fairleigh Dickinson. Will be eligible to play immediately since Jiggetts graduated from Fairleigh Dickinson. |
| Terrence Samuel | 2 | G | 6'3" | 208 | RS Senior | Brooklyn, NY | Transferred from Penn State. Will be eligible to play immediately since Samuel graduated from Penn State. |
| Laquincy Rideau | 3 | G | 6'1" | 204 | Junior | West Palm Beach, FL | Transferred from Gardner–Webb. Under NCAA transfer rules, Rideau will have to sit out for the 2017–18 season. Will have two years of remaining eligibility. |
| Payton Banks | 4 | F | 6'6" | 223 | RS Senior | Orange, CA | Transferred from Penn State. Will be eligible to play immediately since Banks graduated from Penn State. |
| T. J. Lang | 10 | G | 6'7" | 210 | Senior | Mobile, AL | Transferred from Auburn. Under NCAA transfer rules, Lang will have to sit out for the 2017–18 season. Will have one year of remaining eligibility. |
| Nikola Scekic | 41 | C | 7'1" | 255 | Junior | Belgrade, Serbia | Junior college transferred from Hutchinson CC. |

=== 2017 recruiting class ===
College recruiting information
| Name | Hometown | School | Height | Weight | Commit date |
|---|---|---|---|---|---|
| Alexis Yetna #17 PF | Baltimore, MD | Putnam Science Academy | 6 ft 3 in (1.91 m) | 200 lb (91 kg) | Apr 19, 2017 |
| Alexis Yetna #17 PF | Recruit ratings: Scout: Rivals: 247Sports: (79) | | | | |
| David Collins; SG | Pittsburgh, PA | First Love Christian Academy | 6 ft 8 in (2.03 m) | 205 lb (93 kg) | Apr 26, 2017 |
| David Collins; SG | Recruit ratings: Scout: Rivals: 247Sports: (NR) | | | | |
| Justin Brown; SF | Birmingham, AL | Hargrave Military Academy | 6 ft 6 in (1.98 m) | 200 lb (91 kg) | Apr 10, 2017 |
| Justin Brown; SF | Recruit ratings: Scout: Rivals: 247Sports: (NR) | | | | |
Overall recruit ranking:
Note: In many cases, Scout, Rivals, 247Sports, On3, and ESPN may conflict in their listings of height and weight.; In these cases, the average was taken. ESPN grades are on a 100-point scale.; Sources: "2017 Team Ranking". Rivals.

=== 2018 recruiting class ===
College recruiting information (2018)
| Name | Hometown | School | Height | Weight | Commit date |
|---|---|---|---|---|---|
| Rashun Williams; SF | Edison, GA | Calhoun County High School | 6 ft 6 in (1.98 m) | 180 lb (82 kg) | Sep 4, 2017 |
| Rashun Williams; SF | Recruit ratings: Scout: Rivals: 247Sports: (79) | | | | |
| Michael Durr; C | Atlanta, GA | Oldsmar Christian School | 6 ft 11 in (2.11 m) | 210 lb (95 kg) | Sep 11, 2017 |
| Michael Durr; C | Recruit ratings: Scout: Rivals: 247Sports: (79) | | | | |
| Xavier Castaneda; PG | Chicago, IL | Whitney Young High School | 6 ft 0 in (1.83 m) | 185 lb (84 kg) | Sep 12, 2017 |
| Xavier Castaneda; PG | Recruit ratings: Scout: Rivals: 247Sports: (78) | | | | |
Overall recruit ranking:
Note: In many cases, Scout, Rivals, 247Sports, On3, and ESPN may conflict in their listings of height and weight.; In these cases, the average was taken. ESPN grades are on a 100-point scale.; Sources: "2018 Team Ranking". Rivals.

== Preseason ==
At the conference's annual media day, the Bulls were picked to finish last in the AAC.

== Roster ==
2017–18 South Florida Bulls men's basketball team
Players
Coaches

| Pos. | # | Name | Height | Weight | Year | Previous school | Hometown |
|---|---|---|---|---|---|---|---|
| G | 0 | Stephan Jiggetts | 6 ft 1 in (1.85 m) | 195 lb (88 kg) | RS Sr | Fairleigh Dickinson | Forestville, Maryland |
| F | 1 | Isaiah Manderson | 6 ft 10 in (2.08 m) | 247 lb (112 kg) | Sr | Texas Tech | Bronx, New York |
| G | 2 | Terrence Samuel | 6 ft 3 in (1.91 m) | 208 lb (94 kg) | RS Sr | Penn State | Brooklyn, New York |
| G | 3 | Laquincy Rideau (I) (redshirt) | 6 ft 1 in (1.85 m) | 210 lb (95 kg) | Jr | Gardner–Webb | West Palm Beach, Florida |
| G/F | 4 | Payton Banks | 6 ft 6 in (1.98 m) | 223 lb (101 kg) | RS Sr | Penn State | Orange, California |
| F | 5 | Malik Martin | 6 ft 11 in (2.11 m) | 214 lb (97 kg) | RS Jr | USC | Miami, Florida |
| G | 10 | T. J. Lang (I) (redshirt) | 6 ft 7 in (2.01 m) | 210 lb (95 kg) | Sr | Auburn | Mobile, Alabama |
| G | 11 | David Collins | 6 ft 3 in (1.91 m) | 200 lb (91 kg) | Fr | First Love Christian Academy | Youngstown, Ohio |
| G/F | 13 | Justin Brown | 6 ft 6 in (1.98 m) | 210 lb (95 kg) | Fr | Hargrave Military Academy (VA) | Birmingham, Alabama |
| G | 14 | Henry Beard (W) | 6 ft 0 in (1.83 m) | 177 lb (80 kg) | So | Seminole High School | Seminole, Florida |
| F | 15 | Yito Alvarado (W) | 6 ft 7 in (2.01 m) | 206 lb (93 kg) | RS So | University School of NSU | San Juan, Puerto Rico |
| F | 21 | Tulio Da Silva | 6 ft 7 in (2.01 m) | 206 lb (93 kg) | RS So | Arlington Country Day School | Formiga, Brazil |
| G | 22 | Joey Coffaro (W) | 5 ft 11 in (1.8 m) | 170 lb (77 kg) | Fr | John Hersey High School | Arlington Heights, Illinois |
| F | 23 | Alexis Yetna | 6 ft 8 in (2.03 m) | 220 lb (100 kg) | Fr | Putnam Science Academy (CT) | Paris, France |
| G | 25 | Troy Holston | 6 ft 4 in (1.93 m) | 200 lb (91 kg) | RS Jr | Oldsmar Christian School | Queens, New York |
| C | 41 | Nikola Scekic | 7 ft 2 in (2.18 m) | 250 lb (113 kg) | Jr | Hutchinson Community College | Belgrade, Serbia |

Head coach

- Brian Gregory (Oakland)

Assistant coach(es)

- Tom Herrion (Merrimack)
- Chad Dollar (South Florida)
- Scott Wagers (Tennessee Wesleyan)

Legend

- (C) Team captain
- (S) Suspended
- (I) Ineligible
- (W) Walk-on
- Injured
- Current redshirt

Roster

== Schedule and results ==
| Date time, TV | Rank^{#} | Opponent^{#} | Result | Record | Site (attendance) city, state |
Exhibition
| Nov 3, 2017*; 7:00 pm | | Flagler | W 94–66 | | USF Sun Dome (1,307); Tampa, FL |
Non-conference regular season
| Nov 10, 2017*; 8:00 pm, ESPN3 | | Florida Atlantic | W 60–59 | 1–0 | USF Sun Dome (4,192); Tampa, FL |
| Nov 13, 2017*; 7:00 pm, ESPN3 | | Morgan State | L 53–63 | 1–1 | USF Sun Dome (2,116); Tampa, FL |
| Nov 15, 2017*; 8:00 pm, ESPN3 | | at Stetson | W 75–72 | 2–1 | Edmunds Center (836); Deland, FL |
| Nov 19, 2017*; 6:00 pm, BTN | | at Indiana; Hoosier Tip-Off Classic | L 53–70 | 2–2 | Simon Skjodt Assembly Hall (17,222); Bloomington, IN |
| Nov 22, 2017*; 7:00 pm, ESPN3 | | Howard; Hoosier Tip-Off Classic | W 75–52 | 3–2 | USF Sun Dome (2,080); Tampa, FL |
| Nov 24, 2017*; 12:00 pm | | Arkansas State; Hoosier Tip-Off Classic | W 72–61 | 4–2 | USF Sun Dome (2,284); Tampa, FL |
| Nov 26, 2017*; 4:00 pm, ESPN3 | | Eastern Michigan; Hoosier Tip-Off Classic | L 47–65 | 4–3 | USF Sun Dome (2,050); Tampa, FL |
| Nov 30, 2017*; 7:00 pm | | at Elon | L 78–79 ^{OT} | 4–4 | Alumni Gym (1,534); Elon, NC |
| Dec 2, 2017*; 7:00 pm | | at Appalachian State | L 61–84 | 4–5 | Holmes Center (1,506); Boone, NC |
| Dec 11, 2017*; 7:00 pm, ESPN3 | | FIU | L 53–64 | 4–6 | USF Sun Dome (2,040); Tampa, FL |
| Dec 14, 2017*; 7:00 pm | | Bethune–Cookman | W 83–63 | 5–6 | USF Sun Dome (2,091); Tampa, FL |
| Dec 18, 2017*; 7:00 pm | | Northern Arizona | W 70–56 | 6–6 | USF Sun Dome (2,016); Tampa, FL |
| Dec 21, 2017*; 7:00 pm, ESPN3 | | Charlotte | W 78–76 | 7–6 | USF Sun Dome (2,099); Tampa, FL |
AAC regular season
| Dec 28, 2017; 7:00 pm, ESPNews | | Houston | L 60–79 | 7–7 (0–1) | USF Sun Dome (2,273); Tampa, FL |
| Dec 31, 2017; 8:00 pm, ESPNU | | at SMU | L 39–79 | 7–8 (0–2) | Moody Coliseum (6,477); Dallas, TX |
| Jan 3, 2018; 7:00 pm, ESPN3 | | East Carolina | L 65–67 | 7–9 (0–3) | USF Sun Dome (2,148); Tampa, FL |
| Jan 7, 2018; 4:00 pm, CBSSN | | at No. 9 Wichita State | L 57–95 | 7–10 (0–4) | Charles Koch Arena (10,506); Wichita, KS |
| Jan 13, 2018; 7:00 pm, ESPNews | | No. 14 Cincinnati | L 55–78 | 7–11 (0–5) | USF Sun Dome (3,609); Tampa, FL |
| Jan 17, 2018; 6:00 pm, ESPN3 | | at East Carolina | L 52–90 | 7–12 (0–6) | Williams Arena (2,857); Greenville, NC |
| Jan 20, 2018; 7:00 pm, ESPNU | | UCF; Rivalry | L 69–71 | 7–13 (0–7) | USF Sun Dome (4,611); Tampa, FL |
| Jan 25, 2018; 9:00 pm, ESPNU | | at Tulane | W 80–75 | 8–13 (1–7) | Devlin Fieldhouse (1,717); New Orleans, LA |
| Jan 28, 2018; 3:00 pm, ESPN3 | | at Houston | L 40–63 | 8–14 (1–8) | H&PE Arena (3,121); Houston, TX |
| Jan 31, 2018; 8:30 pm, ESPNews | | Memphis | L 74–86 | 8–15 (1–9) | USF Sun Dome (2,754); Tampa, FL |
| Feb 4, 2018; 2:00 pm, ESPN3 | | Tulsa | L 54–63 | 8–16 (1–10) | USF Sun Dome (2,484); Tampa, FL |
| Feb 7, 2018; 7:00 pm, ESPNU | | at UConn | L 65–68 | 8–17 (1–11) | Harry A. Gampel Pavilion (6,636); Storrs, CT |
| Feb 10, 2018; 12:00 pm, ESPNU | | Temple | L 55–73 | 8–18 (1–12) | USF Sun Dome (2,576); Tampa, FL |
| Feb 14, 2018; 6:00 pm, ESPNews | | at UCF; Rivalry | L 57–72 | 8–19 (1–13) | CFE Arena (4,310); Orlando, FL |
| Feb 18, 2018; 3:00 pm, ESPN3 | | at Tulsa | L 61–73 | 8–20 (1–14) | Reynolds Center (4,120); Tulsa, OK |
| Feb 24, 2018; 12:00 pm, ESPNU | | Tulane | L 68–79 | 8–21 (1–15) | USF Sun Dome (2,228); Tampa, FL |
| Mar 1, 2018; 9:00 pm, ESPNews | | at Memphis | W 75–51 | 9–21 (2–15) | FedEx Forum (5,945); Memphis, TN |
| Mar 4, 2018; 2:00 pm, ESPNews | | SMU | W 65–54 | 10–21 (3–15) | USF Sun Dome (2,593); Tampa, FL |
AAC tournament
| Mar 8, 2018; 2:30 pm, ESPNU | (12) | vs. (5) Memphis; First round | L 77–79 | 10–22 | Amway Center (7,856); Orlando, FL |
*Non-conference game. ^{#}Rankings from AP Poll. (#) Tournament seedings in parentheses. All times are in Eastern Time.
