= Michael Perry (basketball) =

American college basketball coach (born 1958)

Mike Perry
Current position
- Title: Assistant Coach
- Team: East Carolina
- Conference: American

Biographical details
- Born: November 10, 1958 (age 67); Oxford, North Carolina, U.S.

Playing career
- 1977–1981: Richmond

Coaching career (HC unless noted)
- 1985–1986: Virginia Union (asst.)
- 1986–1993: Richmond (P/T asst.)
- 1994–1997: Richmond (asst.)
- 1997–2002: Georgia State (asst.)
- 2003–2007: Georgia State
- 2007–2017: East Carolina (asst.)
- 2017–2018: East Carolina (interim HC)
- 2024–present: East Carolina (asst.)

Head coaching record
- Overall: 70–91 (.435)

Michael Perry (born November 10, 1958) is an American college basketball coach who is in his second stint as an assistant men's basketball coach at East Carolina University. Prior to joining the Pirates program, he served as the head men's basketball coach at Georgia State University from 2003 through 2007, and also held assistant coaching positions at Georgia State, Richmond and Virginia Union University. Perry also served as interim head coach of East Carolina for most of the 2017–18 season, as head coach Jeff Lebo underwent hip surgery and stepped down from the position on November 29, 2017.

Perry played for the University of Richmond from 1978 through 1981 and finished his career as the Spiders' career leader in points scored (2,145). Only Johnny Newman has since surpassed that total in a Spiders uniform. Perry was selected in the ninth round of the 1981 NBA draft by the Kansas City Kings.

== Head coaching record ==
Record table
Season	Team	Overall	Conference	Standing	Postseason
Georgia State (Atlantic Sun Conference) (2003–2005)
2002–03	Georgia State	10–9	8–8	4th (North)	
2003–04	Georgia State	20–9	14–6	4th	
2004–05	Georgia State	14–15	11–9	T–4th	
Georgia State (Colonial Athletic Association) (2005–2007)
2005–06	Georgia State	7–22	3–15	T–10th	
2006–07	Georgia State	11–20	5–13	9th	
Georgia State:		62–75 (.453)	41–51 (.446)		
East Carolina (American Athletic Conference) (2017–2018)
2017–18	East Carolina	8–16	4–14	11th	
East Carolina:		8–16 (.333)	4–14 (.222)		
Total:		70–91 (.435)			
National champion Postseason invitational champion Conference regular season champion Conference regular season and conference tournament champion Division regular season champion Division regular season and conference tournament champion Conference tournament champion
