= 2017–18 Memphis Tigers men's basketball team =

American college basketball season

2017–18 Memphis Tigers men's basketball
- Conference: American Athletic Conference
- Record: 21–13 (10–8 AAC)
- Head coach: Tubby Smith (2nd season)
- Assistant coaches: Joe Esposito; Pooh Williamson; Saul Smith
- Home arena: FedExForum

2017–18 American Athletic Conference men's basketball standings
	Conf.				Overall
Team	W		L	PCT	W		L	PCT
No. 6 Cincinnati †	16	–	2	.889	31	–	5	.861
No. 16 Wichita State	14	–	4	.778	25	–	8	.758
No. 21 Houston	14	–	4	.778	27	–	8	.771
Tulsa	12	–	6	.667	19	–	12	.613
Memphis	10	–	8	.556	21	–	13	.618
UCF	9	–	9	.500	19	–	13	.594
Temple	8	–	10	.444	17	–	16	.515
UConn	7	–	11	.389	14	–	18	.438
SMU	6	–	12	.333	17	–	16	.515
Tulane	5	–	13	.278	14	–	17	.452
East Carolina	4	–	14	.222	10	–	20	.333
South Florida	3	–	15	.167	10	–	22	.313
† 2018 AAC tournament winner Rankings from AP poll

The 2017–18 Memphis Tigers men's basketball team represented the University of Memphis in the 2017–18 NCAA Division I men's basketball season, the 97th season of Tiger basketball, the second under head coach Tubby Smith, and the fifth as members of the American Athletic Conference. They played their home games at the FedEx Forum. They finished the season 21–13, 10–8 in AAC play to finish in fifth place. They defeated Tulsa in the AAC tournament before losing to Cincinnati in the semifinals.

On March 14, 2018, the school fired head coach Tubby Smith after two years. On March 20, the school hired former Memphis player and NBA star Penny Hardaway as coach.

== Previous season ==
The Tigers finished the 2016–17 season 19–13, 9–9 in AAC play to finish in a tie for fifth place. They lost in the quarterfinals of the AAC tournament to UCF. Despite having 19 wins, they did not participate in a postseason tournament.

== Offseason ==
=== Departures ===
Following the 2016–17 season, Dedric Lawson, K.J. Lawson, and Markel Crawford, the Tigers' three leading scorers and rebounders, announced they would transfer from Memphis.

Name	Number	Pos.	Height	Weight	Year	Hometown	Notes
K. J. Lawson	0	G/F	6' 7"	210	RS Freshman	Memphis, TN	Transferred to Kansas
Dedric Lawson	1	G/F	6' 9"	236	Sophomore	Memphis, TN	Transferred to Kansas
Keon Clergeot	4	G	6' 1"	187	Freshman	Winter Haven, FL	Transferred to Massachusetts
Markel Crawford	5	G	6' 5"	208	RS Junior	Memphis, TN	Transferred to Ole Miss
Christian Keese	10	G	6' 1"	182	Senior	Las Vegas, NV	Graduated
Craig Randall II	12	G	6' 4"	184	Sophomore	Youngstown, OH	Transferred to Duquesne
Chad Rykhoek	15	F	6' 11"	236	RS Senior	Fort Worth, TX	Transferred
Jake McDowell	42	G/F	6' 5"	218	Senior	Memphis, TN	Graduated

=== Incoming transfers ===
Name	Num	Pos.	Height	Weight	Year	Hometown	Notes
Kyvon Davenport	0	PF	6'8"	185	Sophomore	Gainesville, GA	Junior college transfer from Georgia Highlands College.
Raynere Thornton	4	SF	6'7"	215	Sophomore	Marietta, GA	Junior college transfer from Gordon College.
Kareem Brewton	5	SG	6'3"	205	Sophomore	Snellville, GA	Junior college transfer from Eastern Florida State College.
Mike Parks Jr.	10	C	6'9"	270	Sophomore	Cleveland, OH	Junior college transfer from SW Mississippi CC.
Malik Rhodes	11	SG	6'2"	170	Sophomore	Cincinnati, OH	Junior college transfer from Barton CC.

=== 2017 recruiting class ===
College recruiting information
Name	Hometown	School	Height	Weight	Commit date
Victor Enoh; PF	Decatur, Georgia	Greenforest Christian Academy	6 ft 8 in (2.03 m)	235 lb (107 kg)	Oct 7, 2016
Victor Enoh; PF	Recruit ratings: Scout: Rivals: 247Sports: ESPN:				
David Nickelberry; SF	Orlando, Florida	Windermere Prep	6 ft 7 in (2.01 m)	202 lb (92 kg)	Apr 6, 2017
David Nickelberry; SF	Recruit ratings: Scout: Rivals: 247Sports: ESPN:				
Jamal Johnson; SG	Birmingham, Alabama	Spain Park HS	6 ft 4 in (1.93 m)	180 lb (82 kg)	Nov 9, 2016
Jamal Johnson; SG	Recruit ratings: Scout: Rivals: 247Sports: ESPN:				
Overall recruit ranking:
Note: In many cases, Scout, Rivals, 247Sports, On3, and ESPN may conflict in their listings of height and weight.; In these cases, the average was taken. ESPN grades are on a 100-point scale.; Sources: "2017 Team Ranking". Rivals.

==== 2018 recruiting class ====
College recruiting information
Name	Hometown	School	Height	Weight	Commit date
Alex Lomax; PG	Memphis, TN	East HS	5 ft 11 in (1.80 m)	189 lb (86 kg)	Apr 4, 2018
Alex Lomax; PG	Recruit ratings: Scout: Rivals: 247Sports: ESPN: (80)				
Ryan Boyce; SF	Memphis, TN	East High School	6 ft 5 in (1.96 m)	180 lb (82 kg)	Oct 13, 2017
Ryan Boyce; SF	Recruit ratings: Scout: Rivals: (NR)				
Tyler Harris; PG	Memphis, TN	Cordova HS	5 ft 9 in (1.75 m)	155 lb (70 kg)	Apr 13, 2018
Tyler Harris; PG	Recruit ratings: Scout: Rivals: 247Sports: ESPN: (80)				
Antwann Jones; SG	Orlando, FL	Oak Ridge HS	6 ft 6 in (1.98 m)	210 lb (95 kg)	Apr 15, 2018
Antwann Jones; SG	Recruit ratings: Scout: Rivals: 247Sports: ESPN: (81)				
Jayden Hardaway; SG	Memphis, TN	IMG Academy (FL)	6 ft 4 in (1.93 m)	175 lb (79 kg)	Apr 3, 2018
Jayden Hardaway; SG	Recruit ratings: Scout: Rivals: 247Sports: ESPN:				
David Wingett; SG	Winnebago, NE	Bull City Prep (NC)	6 ft 7 in (2.01 m)	185 lb (84 kg)	May 9, 2018
David Wingett; SG	Recruit ratings: Scout: Rivals: 247Sports: ESPN:				
Overall recruit ranking:
Note: In many cases, Scout, Rivals, 247Sports, On3, and ESPN may conflict in their listings of height and weight.; In these cases, the average was taken. ESPN grades are on a 100-point scale.; Sources: "2018 Team Ranking". Rivals.

== Roster ==
2017–18 Memphis Tigers men's basketball team
Players
Coaches

Pos.	#	Name	Height	Weight	Year	Previous school	Hometown
F	0	Kyvon Davenport	6 ft 8 in (2.03 m)	185 lb (84 kg)	Jr	East Hall HS/Georgia Highlands	Gainesville, Georgia
G	1	Jamal Johnson	6 ft 4 in (1.93 m)	180 lb (82 kg)	Fr	Spain Park HS	Birmingham, Alabama
G/F	2	Jimario Rivers	6 ft 8 in (2.03 m)	193 lb (88 kg)	Sr	Kenwood HS/SW Tennessee CC	Clarksville, Tennessee
G	3	Jeremiah Martin	6 ft 3 in (1.91 m)	180 lb (82 kg)	Jr	Mitchell HS	Memphis, Tennessee
G/F	4	Raynere Thornton	6 ft 7 in (2.01 m)	235 lb (107 kg)	Jr	Marietta HS/Gordon State	Marietta, Georgia
G	5	Kareem Brewton	6 ft 3 in (1.91 m)	190 lb (86 kg)	Jr	Shiloh HS/Eastern Florida State	Claxton, Georgia
F	10	Mike Parks	6 ft 9 in (2.06 m)	270 lb (122 kg)	Jr	Richmond Heights HS/SW Mississippi CC	Cleveland, Ohio
G	11	Jonathan Bins	5 ft 11 in (1.8 m)	150 lb (68 kg)	So	Germantown HS	Memphis, Tennessee
F	12	Victor Enoh	6 ft 8 in (2.03 m)	235 lb (107 kg)	Fr	Greenforest Christian Academy	Decatur, Georgia
G	15	David Nickelberry	6 ft 7 in (2.01 m)	202 lb (92 kg)	Fr	Windermere Prep	Orlando, Florida
F	23	Karim Sameh Azab	6 ft 11 in (2.11 m)	290 lb (132 kg)	So	Hales Franciscan HS	Giza, Egypt
G	30	Kytrel Williams	6 ft 3 in (1.91 m)	207 lb (94 kg)	Sr	Harding Academy/Motlow State CC	Memphis, Tennessee
F	32	Alex Moffatt	6 ft 5 in (1.96 m)	223 lb (101 kg)	Sr	Fayette Academy/Shawnee State	Somerville, Tennessee

Head coach

- Tubby Smith (High Point)

Assistant coach(es)

- Pooh Williamson (Tulsa)
- Joe Esposito (Marist)
- Saul Smith (Kentucky)

Legend

- (C) Team captain
- (S) Suspended
- (I) Ineligible
- (W) Walk-on
- Injured
- Current redshirt

Roster

== Schedule and results ==
Date time, TV	Rank^{#}	Opponent^{#}	Result	Record	Site (attendance) city, state
Exhibition
Nov 2, 2017*; 7:00 pm		LeMoyne–Owen	W 101–78		FedEx Forum; Memphis, TN
Non-conference regular season
Nov 10, 2017*; 5:30 pm, CBSSN		vs. Alabama; Veterans Classic	L 70–82	0–1	Alumni Hall (3,238); Annapolis, MD
Nov 14, 2017*; 7:00 pm, ESPN3		Little Rock	W 70–62	1–1	FedEx Forum (7,224); Memphis, TN
Nov 21, 2017*; 7:00 pm, ESPN3		New Orleans	W 62–53	2–1	FedEx Forum (7,224); Memphis, TN
Nov 25, 2017*; 5:00 pm, ESPN3		Northern Kentucky	W 76–74	3–1	FedEx Forum (5,369); Memphis, TN
Nov 30, 2017*; 7:00 pm		at UAB; Bartow Classic	L 56–71	3–2	Bartow Arena (4,920); Birmingham, AL
Dec 2, 2017*; 4:00 pm, ESPN3		Mercer	W 83–81 ^{2OT}	4–2	FedEx Forum (4,113); Memphis, TN
Dec 5, 2017*; 7:00 pm, ESPN3		Samford	W 65–64	5–2	FedEx Forum (4,702); Memphis, TN
Dec 9, 2017*; 12:00 pm, ESPN3		Bryant; Gotham Classic	W 90–72	6–2	FedEx Forum (4,373); Memphis, TN
Dec 12, 2017*; 8:00 pm, ESPNU		Albany; Gotham Classic	W 67–58	7–2	FedEx Forum (4,168); Memphis, TN
Dec 16, 2017*; 11:00 am, ESPN2		vs. Louisville; Gotham Classic/Rivalry	L 72–81	7–3	Madison Square Garden (6,525); New York, NY
Dec 20, 2017*; 7:00 pm, ESPN3		Siena; Gotham Classic	W 70–66	8–3	FedEx Forum (6,079); Memphis, TN
Dec 23, 2017*; 11:00 am, ESPN3		Loyola (MD)	W 83–71	9–3	FedEx Forum (5,825); Memphis, TN
Dec 28, 2017*; 8:00 pm, CBSSN		LSU	L 61–71	9–4	FedEx Forum (9,468); Memphis, TN
AAC regular season
Dec 31, 2017; 3:00 pm, ESPNU		at No. 21 Cincinnati	L 48–82	9–5 (0–1)	BB&T Arena (8,143); Highland Heights, KY
Jan 3, 2018; 6:00 pm, ESPN3		at UCF	L 56–65	9–6 (0–2)	CFE Arena (4,298); Orlando, FL
Jan 6, 2018; 3:00 pm, ESPNews		Tulsa	W 76–67	10–6 (1–2)	FedEx Forum (6,004); Memphis, TN
Jan 9, 2018; 6:00 pm, ESPNews		Tulane	W 96–89	11–6 (2–2)	FedEx Forum (4,825); Memphis, TN
Jan 13, 2018; 1:00 pm, CBSSN		at Temple	W 75–72 ^{OT}	12–6 (3–2)	Liacouras Center (6,238); Philadelphia, PA
Jan 16, 2018; 8:00 pm, CBSSN		UConn	W 73–49	13–6 (4–2)	FedEx Forum (2,417); Memphis, TN
Jan 20, 2018; 7:00 pm, ESPNU		at Tulsa	L 51–64	13–7 (4–3)	Reynolds Center (5,189); Tulsa, OK
Jan 27, 2018; 5:00 pm, CBSSN		No. 9 Cincinnati	L 48–62	13–8 (4–4)	FedEx Forum (12,223); Memphis, TN
Jan 31, 2018; 7:30 pm, ESPNews		at South Florida	W 86–74	14–8 (5–4)	USF Sun Dome (2,754); Tampa, FL
Feb 3, 2018; 1:00 pm, ESPNews		at East Carolina	L 85–88 ^{OT}	14–9 (5–5)	Williams Arena (3,338); Greenville, NC
Feb 6, 2018; 8:00 pm, CBSSN		No. 22 Wichita State	L 65–85	14–10 (5–6)	FedEx Forum (7,257); Memphis, TN
Feb 11, 2018; 3:00 pm, CBSSN		UCF	L 64–68	14–11 (5–7)	FedEx Forum (7,163); Memphis, TN
Feb 14, 2018; 8:00 pm, ESPNU		at SMU	W 70–67	15–11 (6–7)	Moody Coliseum (6,539); Dallas, TX
Feb 17, 2018; 2:00 pm, ESPNU		at Tulane	W 68–63	16–11 (7–7)	Devlin Fieldhouse (1,896); New Orleans, LA
Feb 22, 2018; 8:00 pm, CBSSN		No. 23 Houston	W 91–85	17–11 (8–7)	FedEx Forum (6,536); Memphis, TN
Feb 25, 2018; 3:00 pm, ESPN		at UConn	W 83–79	18–11 (9–7)	Gampel Pavilion (8,574); Storrs, CT
Mar 1, 2018; 8:00 pm, ESPNews		South Florida	L 51–75	18–12 (9–8)	FedEx Forum (5,945); Memphis, TN
Mar 4, 2018; 2:00 pm, ESPNews		East Carolina	W 90–70	19–12 (10–8)	FedEx Forum (6,474); Memphis, TN
AAC tournament
Mar 8, 2018; 1:30 pm, ESPNU	(5)	vs. (12) USF; First Round	W 79–77	20–12	Amway Center (7,856); Orlando, FL
Mar 9, 2018; 1:17 pm, ESPN2	(5)	vs. (4) Tulsa; Quarterfinals	W 67–64	21–12	Amway Center (8,491); Orlando, FL
Mar 10, 2018; 12:00 pm, CBS	(5)	vs. (1) No. 8 Cincinnati; Semifinals	L 60–70	21–13	Amway Center; Orlando, FL
*Non-conference game. ^{#}Rankings from AP Poll. (#) Tournament seedings in parentheses. All times are in Central Time.
