= 2017–18 Tulsa Golden Hurricane men's basketball team =

American college basketball season

2017–18 Tulsa Golden Hurricane men's basketball
- Conference: American Athletic Conference
- Record: 19–12 (12–6 AAC)
- Head coach: Frank Haith (4th season)
- Assistant coaches: Danny Henderson; Kenton Paulino; Shea Seals
- Home arena: Reynolds Center

2017–18 American Athletic Conference men's basketball standings
	Conf.				Overall
Team	W		L	PCT	W		L	PCT
No. 6 Cincinnati †	16	–	2	.889	31	–	5	.861
No. 16 Wichita State	14	–	4	.778	25	–	8	.758
No. 21 Houston	14	–	4	.778	27	–	8	.771
Tulsa	12	–	6	.667	19	–	12	.613
Memphis	10	–	8	.556	21	–	13	.618
UCF	9	–	9	.500	19	–	13	.594
Temple	8	–	10	.444	17	–	16	.515
UConn	7	–	11	.389	14	–	18	.438
SMU	6	–	12	.333	17	–	16	.515
Tulane	5	–	13	.278	14	–	17	.452
East Carolina	4	–	14	.222	10	–	20	.333
South Florida	3	–	15	.167	10	–	22	.313
† 2018 AAC tournament winner Rankings from AP poll

The 2017–18 Tulsa Golden Hurricane men's basketball team represented the University of Tulsa during the 2017–18 NCAA Division I men's basketball season. The Golden Hurricane, led by fourth-year head coach Frank Haith, played their home games at the Reynolds Center in Tulsa, Oklahoma as members of the American Athletic Conference. They finished the season 19–12, 12–6 in AAC play to finish in fourth place. They lost in the quarterfinals of the AAC tournament to Memphis.

== Previous season ==
The Golden Hurricane finished the 2016–17 season 15–17, 8–10 in AAC play to finish in seventh place. They defeated Tulane in the first round of the AAC tournament to advance to the quarterfinals where they lost to Cincinnati.

== Offseason ==
=== Departures ===
Name	Number	Pos.	Height	Weight	Year	Hometown	Reason for departure
Cory Haith	2	G	5'11"	175	RS Senior	Miami, FL	Walk-on; graduated
Travis Atson	3	F	6'5"	204	Freshman	Brooklyn, NY	Transferred to Quinnipiac
Pat Birt	11	G	6'5"	182	Senior	Plano, TX	Graduated
Will Magnay	12	F	6'10"	234	Freshman	Brisbane, Australia	Signed to play professionally in Australia with Brisbane Bullets
T. K. Edogi	14	F	6'8"	227	RS Junior	Surprise, AZ	Graduate transferred to Iona
Joseph Battle	15	G	6'3"	181	Freshman	Abbeville, SC	Transferred to Appalachian State

=== Incoming transfers ===
Name	Number	Pos.	Height	Weight	Year	Hometown	Notes
DaQuan Jeffries	2	F	6'5"	201	Junior	Edmond, OK	Junior college transferred from Western Texas College.
Jeriah Horne	41	F	6'7"	222	Sophomore	Overland Park, KS	Transferred from Nebraska. Under NCAA transfer rules, Horne will have to sit out for the 2017–18 season. Will have three years of remaining eligibility.

=== 2017 recruiting class ===
College recruiting information
Name	Hometown	School	Height	Weight	Commit date
Elijah Joiner; PG	Chicago, IL	Curie High School	6 ft 3 in (1.91 m)	N/A	Oct 23, 2016
Elijah Joiner; PG	Recruit ratings: Scout: Rivals: (NR)				
Darien Jackson; SG	Overland Park, KS	Blue Valley Northwest High School	6 ft 2 in (1.88 m)	172 lb (78 kg)	Feb 23, 2017
Darien Jackson; SG	Recruit ratings: Scout: Rivals: (NR)				
Overall recruit ranking:
Note: In many cases, Scout, Rivals, 247Sports, On3, and ESPN may conflict in their listings of height and weight.; In these cases, the average was taken. ESPN grades are on a 100-point scale.; Sources: "Tulsa 2017 Basketball Commitments". Rivals.; "2017 Team Ranking". Rivals.

== Roster ==
2017–18 Tulsa Golden Hurricane men's basketball team
Players
Coaches

Pos.	#	Name	Height	Weight	Year	Previous school	Hometown
F	0	Junior Etou	6 ft 7 in (2.01 m)	235 lb (107 kg)	RS Sr	Bishop O'Connell HS; Rutgers	Republic of Congo
F	1	Martins Igbanu	6 ft 8 in (2.03 m)	244 lb (111 kg)	So	Covenant Christian Ministries Academy	Lagos, Nigeria
G/F	2	DaQuan Jeffries	6 ft 5 in (1.96 m)	225 lb (102 kg)	Jr	Santa Fe HS; Oral Roberts; Western Texas CC	Edmond, OK
G	3	Elijah Joiner	6 ft 3 in (1.91 m)	205 lb (93 kg)	Fr	Curie Metropolitan HS	Chicago, IL
G	4	Sterling Taplin	6 ft 1 in (1.85 m)	200 lb (91 kg)	Jr	St. Thomas More School	Williamsville, NY
G	5	Lawson Korita	5 ft 5 in (1.65 m)	207 lb (94 kg)	So	Pulaski Academy	Little Rock, AR
G	10	Curran Scott	6 ft 4 in (1.93 m)	210 lb (95 kg)	RS So	Edmond Memorial HS; Charlotte	Edmond, OK
G	11	Darien Jackson	6 ft 2 in (1.88 m)	188 lb (85 kg)	Fr	Blue Valley Northwest HS	Overland Park, KS
G	13	Jaleel Wheeler	6 ft 4 in (1.93 m)	195 lb (88 kg)	Sr	St. George's School; Kilgore College	Newark, NJ
G	32	Corey Henderson Jr.	6 ft 5 in (1.96 m)	180 lb (82 kg)	Sr	Episcopal School; Wichita State; Blinn College	Abbeville, SC
F	34	Alex Foree (W)	6 ft 5 in (1.96 m)	212 lb (96 kg)	Jr	Southside HS	Fort Smith, AR
F	35	Geno Artison	6 ft 9 in (2.06 m)	205 lb (93 kg)	RS Jr	Franklin HS; College of Southern Idaho	Seattle, WA
F	41	Jeriah Horne (redshirt)	6 ft 7 in (2.01 m)	219 lb (99 kg)	So	The Barstow School; Nebraska	Overland Park, KS

Head coach

- Frank Haith (Elon)

Assistant coach(es)

- Danny Henderson (Austin College)
- Kenton Paulino (Texas)
- Shea Seals (Tulsa)

Legend

- (C) Team captain
- (S) Suspended
- (I) Ineligible
- (W) Walk-on
- Injured
- Current redshirt

Roster

== Schedule and results ==
Date time, TV	Rank^{#}	Opponent^{#}	Result	Record	Site (attendance) city, state
Exhibition
October 30, 2017*; 7:00 pm		Northwestern Oklahoma State	W 96–65		Reynolds Center (3,133); Tulsa, OK
November 4, 2017*; 3:00 pm		Missouri S&T	W 113–56		Reynolds Center (3,088); Tulsa, OK
Non-conference regular season
November 10, 2017*; 12:00 pm		Lamar	L 67–74	0–1	Reynolds Center (7,431); Tulsa, OK
November 13, 2017*; 7:00 pm		Oral Roberts; Mayor's Cup	W 90–71	1–1	Reynolds Center (4,437); Tulsa, OK
November 16, 2017*; 7:00 pm, ESPNews		vs. Western Michigan; Puerto Rico Tip-Off quarterfinals	W 81–74	2–1	HTC Center (704); Conway, SC
November 17, 2017*; 6:00 pm, ESPNU		vs. Iowa State; Puerto Rico Tip-Off semifinals	L 78–80	2–2	HTC Center (1,827); Conway, SC
November 19, 2017*; 4:00 pm, ESPNU		vs. Illinois State; Puerto Rico Tip-Off 3rd place game	L 68–84	2–3	HTC Center (2,119); Conway, SC
November 25, 2017*; 11:00 am		Central Arkansas	W 92–72	3–3	Reynolds Center (3,259); Tulsa, OK
November 28, 2017*; 7:00 pm, ESPN3		UTSA	W 100–96	4–3	Reynolds Center (3,237); Tulsa, OK
December 2, 2017*; 3:00 pm, ESPN3/NBCSC+		at Illinois State	L 58–65	4–4	Redbird Arena (5,803); Normal, IL
December 9, 2017*; 7:00 pm, FSKC/ESPN3		vs. Kansas State; Wichita Wildcat Classic	W 61–54	5–4	Intrust Bank Arena (7,180); Wichita, KS
December 14, 2017*; 7:00 pm, ESPN3		Prairie View A&M	W 77–73	6–4	Reynolds Center (3,315); Tulsa, OK
December 16, 2017*; 6:00 pm, ESPN3		Manhattan	W 80–66	7–4	Reynolds Center (3,382); Tulsa, OK
December 19, 2017*; 8:00 pm, FSOK		at Oklahoma State	L 59–71	7–5	Gallagher-Iba Arena (5,412); Stillwater, OK
AAC regular season
December 28, 2017; 4:00 pm, ESPNU		East Carolina	W 79–53	8–5 (1–0)	Reynolds Center (8,355); Tulsa, OK
December 31, 2017; 2:00 pm, ESPN3		at Tulane	W 65–56	9–5 (2–0)	Devlin Fieldhouse (1,518); New Orleans, LA
January 3, 2018; 6:00 pm, ESPNews		UConn	W 90–88 ^{2OT}	10–5 (3–0)	Reynolds Center (3,903); Tulsa, OK
January 6, 2018; 3:00 pm, ESPNews		at Memphis	L 67–76	10–6 (3–1)	FedExForum (6,004); Memphis, TN
January 11, 2018; 6:00 pm, ESPNU		at Houston	L 71–104	10–7 (3–2)	H&PE Arena (2,666); Houston, TX
January 13, 2018; 6:30 pm, ESPNU		No. 5 Wichita State	L 69–72	10–8 (3–3)	Reynolds Center (8,355); Tulsa, OK
January 17, 2018; 5:00 pm, ESPNews		at Temple	L 58–59	10–9 (3–4)	Liacouras Center (4,694); Philadelphia, PA
January 20, 2018; 7:00 pm, ESPNU		Memphis	W 64–51	11–9 (4–4)	Reynolds Center (5,189); Tulsa, OK
January 28, 2018; 5:00 pm, CBSSN		at No. 17 Wichita State	L 71–90	11–10 (4–5)	Charles Koch Arena (10,506); Wichita, KS
February 1, 2018; 7:00 pm, CBSSN		SMU	W 76–67	12–10 (5–5)	Reynolds Center (4,337); Tulsa, OK
February 4, 2018; 12:00 pm, ESPN3		at South Florida	W 63–54	13–10 (6–5)	USF Sun Dome (2,484); Tampa, FL
February 8, 2018; 6:00 pm, ESPNews		Tulane	W 91–89 ^{OT}	14–10 (7–5)	Reynolds Center (4,019); Tulsa, OK
February 15, 2018; 6:00 pm, ESPNU		at UConn	W 73–71	15–10 (8–5)	XL Center (10,656); Hartford, CT
February 18, 2018; 2:00 pm, ESPN3		South Florida	W 73–61	16–10 (9–5)	Reynolds Center (4,120); Tulsa, OK
February 21, 2018; 8:00 pm, ESPNews		UCF	W 70–61	17–10 (10–5)	Reynolds Center (3,342); Tulsa, OK
February 25, 2018; 11:00 am, CBSSN		at No. 11 Cincinnati	L 74–82	17–11 (10–6)	BB&T Arena (8,911); Highland Heights, KY
March 1, 2018; 6:00 pm, ESPNU		at East Carolina	W 72–58	18–11 (11–6)	Williams Arena (3,205); Greenville, NC
March 4, 2018; 2:00 pm, ESPN3		Temple	W 76–58	19–11 (12–6)	Reynolds Center (5,303); Tulsa, OK
AAC tournament
March 9, 2018; 1:00 pm, ESPN2	(4)	vs. (5) Memphis; Quarterfinals	L 64–67	19–12	Amway Center (8,491); Orlando, FL
*Non-conference game. ^{#}Rankings from AP Poll. (#) Tournament seedings in parentheses. All times are in Central Time.
