= 2017–18 UCF Knights men's basketball team =

American college basketball season

2017–18 UCF Knights men's basketball
- Conference: American Athletic Conference
- Record: 19–13 (9–9 AAC)
- Head coach: Johnny Dawkins (2nd season)
- Assistant coaches: Kevin Norris (2nd season); Vince Taylor (1st season); Robbie Laing (2nd season)
- Home arena: CFE Arena

2017–18 American Athletic Conference men's basketball standings
	Conf.				Overall
Team	W		L	PCT	W		L	PCT
No. 6 Cincinnati †	16	–	2	.889	31	–	5	.861
No. 16 Wichita State	14	–	4	.778	25	–	8	.758
No. 21 Houston	14	–	4	.778	27	–	8	.771
Tulsa	12	–	6	.667	19	–	12	.613
Memphis	10	–	8	.556	21	–	13	.618
UCF	9	–	9	.500	19	–	13	.594
Temple	8	–	10	.444	17	–	16	.515
UConn	7	–	11	.389	14	–	18	.438
SMU	6	–	12	.333	17	–	16	.515
Tulane	5	–	13	.278	14	–	17	.452
East Carolina	4	–	14	.222	10	–	20	.333
South Florida	3	–	15	.167	10	–	22	.313
† 2018 AAC tournament winner Rankings from AP poll

The 2017–18 UCF Knights men's basketball team represented the University of Central Florida during the 2017–18 NCAA Division I men's basketball season. They were members of the American Athletic Conference. The Knights, in the program's 49th season of basketball, were led by second-year head coach Johnny Dawkins and played their home games at the CFE Arena on the university's main campus in Orlando, Florida. They finished the season 19–13 overall and 9–9 in AAC play to finish in 6th place. In the AAC tournament, they defeated East Carolina in the first round before losing to Houston in the quarterfinals.

== Previous season ==
The Knights finished the 2016–17 season 24–12, 11–7 in AAC play to finish in fourth place. They defeated Memphis in the quarterfinals of the AAC tournament before losing in the semifinals to SMU. They received an invitation to the National Invitation Tournament, where they defeated Colorado, Illinois State, and Illinois to advance to the semifinals at Madison Square Garden for the first time in school history. There, they lost to the eventual NIT Champion, TCU.

== Offseason ==
=== Departures ===
Name	Number	Pos.	Height	Weight	Year	Hometown	Reason for departure
Tank Efinanayi	0	G/F	6'6"	210	Senior	Orlando, FL	Graduated
Matt Williams	12	G	6'5"	215	RS senior	Orlando, FL	Graduated
Nick Banyard	14	F	6'8"	230	RS senior	Flower Mound, TX	Graduated

=== Incoming transfers ===
Name	Number	Pos.	Height	Weight	Year	Hometown	Previous school
Collin Smith	15	C	6'10"	240	Sophomore	Jacksonville, FL	Transferred from George Washington. Under NCAA transfer rules, Smith had to sit out from the 2017–18 season. Had three years of remaining eligibility.

=== 2017 recruiting class ===
College recruiting
Name	Hometown	School	Height	Weight	Commit date
Myles Douglas #64 PF	Aberdeen, MD	Aberdeen High School	6 ft 4 in (1.93 m)	175 lb (79 kg)	Jul 12, 2016
Myles Douglas #64 PF	Recruit ratings: Scout: Rivals: (75)				
Daniel Lewis; SG	Atlanta, GA	Westlake High School	6 ft 4 in (1.93 m)	175 lb (79 kg)	May 17, 2016
Daniel Lewis; SG	Recruit ratings: Scout: Rivals: (NR)				
Overall recruit ranking:
Note: In many cases, Scout, Rivals, 247Sports, On3, and ESPN may conflict in their listings of height and weight.; In these cases, the average was taken. ESPN grades are on a 100-point scale.; Sources: "2017 Team Ranking". Rivals.

=== 2018 recruiting class ===
College recruiting (2018)
Name	Hometown	School	Height	Weight	Commit date
Andreas Fuller Jr. SG	Saint Petersburg, FL	Saint Andrews School	6 ft 6 in (1.98 m)	190 lb (86 kg)	
Andreas Fuller Jr. SG	Recruit ratings: Scout: Rivals: (75)				
Overall recruit ranking:
Note: In many cases, Scout, Rivals, 247Sports, On3, and ESPN may conflict in their listings of height and weight.; In these cases, the average was taken. ESPN grades are on a 100-point scale.; Sources: "2018 Team Ranking". Rivals.

== Roster ==
2017–18 UCF Knights men's basketball team
Players
Coaches

Pos.	#	Name	Height	Weight	Year	Previous school	Hometown
G	1	B. J. Taylor	6 ft 2 in (1.88 m)	200 lb (91 kg)	RS Jr	William R. Boone High School	Orlando, Florida
G	2	Terrell Allen	6 ft 2 in (1.88 m)	183 lb (83 kg)	RS So	Drexel	Upper Marlboro, Maryland
G/F	3	A. J. Davis	6 ft 9 in (2.06 m)	215 lb (98 kg)	RS Sr	Tennessee	Atlanta, Georgia
G	4	Ceasar DeJesus	6 ft 2 in (1.88 m)	195 lb (88 kg)	RS Fr	Mt. Zion Prep	Jersey City, New Jersey
F	5	Myles Douglas	6 ft 8 in (2.03 m)	215 lb (98 kg)	Fr	Aberdeen High School	Edgewood, Maryland
G	10	Dayon Griffin	6 ft 4 in (1.93 m)	208 lb (94 kg)	RS Jr	Louisiana Tech	St. Petersburg, Florida
F	11	Rokas Ulvydas	6 ft 11 in (2.11 m)	235 lb (107 kg)	RS So	Texas Tech	Kaunas, Lithuania
G	13	Daniel Lewis	6 ft 5 in (1.96 m)	175 lb (79 kg)	Fr	Westlake High School	Atlanta, Georgia
G/F	15	Aubrey Dawkins (redshirt)	6 ft 6 in (1.98 m)	205 lb (93 kg)	Jr	Michigan	Palo Alto, California
G	20	Brock Stephenson (W)	6 ft 0 in (1.83 m)	190 lb (86 kg)	So	Dade Christian School	Miami, Florida
F	21	Chad Brown	6 ft 9 in (2.06 m)	240 lb (109 kg)	Jr	Deltona High School	Deltona, Florida
G	22	Chance McSpadden	6 ft 4 in (1.93 m)	184 lb (83 kg)	RS So	Winter Haven High School	Winter Haven, Florida
C	24	Tacko Fall	7 ft 6 in (2.29 m)	295 lb (134 kg)	Jr	Liberty Christian Prep	Dakar, Senegal
G	25	Tate Morse (W)	6 ft 4 in (1.93 m)	165 lb (75 kg)	Sr	Orangewood Christian	Orlando, Florida
G/F	30	Anthony Catotti (W)	6 ft 4 in (1.93 m)	200 lb (91 kg)	Sr	Seminole High School	Oviedo, Florida
G	33	Djordjije Mumin (W)	6 ft 5 in (1.96 m)	210 lb (95 kg)	Sr	American Heritage	Podgorica, Montenegro
C	35	Collin Smith (redshirt)	6 ft 11 in (2.11 m)	235 lb (107 kg)	So	George Washington	Jacksonville, Florida
G	51	Nathan Laing (W)	6 ft 1 in (1.85 m)	185 lb (84 kg)	RS Sr	Jacksonville State	Lillington, North Carolina

Head coach

- Johnny Dawkins (Duke)

Assistant coach(es)

- Kevin Norris (Miami (FL))
- Vince Taylor (Duke)
- Robbie Laing (Troy)

Legend

- (C) Team captain
- (S) Suspended
- (I) Ineligible
- (W) Walk-on
- Injured
- Current redshirt

Roster
Last update: November 11, 2017

== Schedule and results ==
Date time, TV	Rank^{#}	Opponent^{#}	Result	Record	Site (attendance) city, state
Non-conference regular season
Nov 10, 2017*; 8:00 pm, ESPN3		Mercer	W 88–79	1–0	CFE Arena (6,167); Orlando, FL
Nov 15, 2017*; 7:00 pm, ESPN3		Gardner–Webb	W 68–65	2–0	CFE Arena (4,016); Orlando, FL
Nov 18, 2017*; 2:00 pm, ESPN3		William & Mary	W 75–64	3–0	CFE Arena (4,143); Orlando, FL
Nov 23, 2017*; 6:00 pm, ESPN3		vs. Nebraska; AdvoCare Invitational quarterfinals	W 68–59	4–0	HP Field House (3,348); Lake Buena Vista, FL
Nov 24, 2017*; 8:30 pm, ESPN2		vs. No. 23 West Virginia; AdvoCare Invitational semifinals	L 45–83	4–1	HP Field House (2,834); Lake Buena Vista, FL
Nov 26, 2017*; 12:00 pm, ESPNU		vs. St. John's; AdvoCare Invitational 3rd place game	L 43–46	4–2	HP Field House (1,712); Lake Buena Vista, FL
Nov 30, 2017*; 9:00 pm, ESPN2		Missouri	L 59–62	4–3	CFE Arena (5,122); Orlando, FL
Dec 3, 2017*; 2:00 pm, ESPNU		at No. 24 Alabama	W 65–62	5–3	Coleman Coliseum (13,534); Tuscaloosa, AL
Dec 9, 2017*; 1:00 pm, ESPN3		Southern	W 76–60	6–3	CFE Arena (4,139); Orlando, FL
Dec 12, 2017*; 7:00 pm, ESPN3		Southeastern Louisiana	W 61–53	7–3	CFE Arena (3,449); Orlando, FL
Dec 19, 2017*; 6:00 pm, ESPN3		at Stetson	W 74–55	8–3	Edmunds Center (1,918); DeLand, FL
Dec 21, 2017*; 7:00 pm, ESPN3		South Carolina State	W 89–64	9–3	CFE Arena (3,055); Orlando, FL
AAC regular season
Dec 27, 2017; 9:00 pm, ESPN2		at SMU	L 51–56	9–4 (0–1)	Moody Coliseum (6,628); Dallas, TX
Dec 31, 2017; 4:00 pm, ESPNews		at East Carolina	W 59–39	10–4 (1–1)	Williams Arena (2,946); Greenville, NC
Jan 3, 2018; 7:00 pm, ESPN3		Memphis	W 65–56	11–4 (2–1)	CFE Arena (4,298); Orlando, FL
Jan 7, 2018; 12:00 pm, CBSSN		Temple	W 60–39	12–4 (3–1)	CFE Arena (4,010); Orlando, FL
Jan 10, 2018; 7:00 pm, CBSSN		at UConn	L 53–62	12–5 (3–2)	Harry A. Gampel Pavilion (5,065); Storrs, CT
Jan 16, 2018; 7:00 pm, CBSSN		No. 12 Cincinnati	L 38–49	12–6 (3–3)	CFE Arena (7,565); Orlando, FL
Jan 20, 2018; 6:00 pm, ESPNews		at South Florida; Rivalry	W 71–69	13–6 (4–3)	USF Sun Dome (4,611); Tampa, FL
Jan 25, 2018; 9:00 pm, ESPN2		at No. 17 Wichita State	L 62–81	13–7 (4–4)	Charles Koch Arena (10,506); Wichita, KS
Jan 31, 2018; 9:00 pm, CBSSN		UConn	W 70–61	14–7 (5–4)	CFE Arena (5,233); Orlando, FL
Feb 3, 2018; 12:00 pm, ESPNU		Houston	L 65–69	14–8 (5–5)	CFE Arena (4,301); Orlando, FL
Feb 6, 2018; 7:00 pm, CBSSN		at No. 6 Cincinnati	L 40–77	14–9 (5–6)	BB&T Arena (8,673); Highland Heights, KY
Feb 11, 2018; 4:00 pm, CBSSN		at Memphis	W 68–64	15–9 (6–6)	FedEx Forum (7,163); Memphis, TN
Feb 14, 2018; 6:00 pm, ESPNU		South Florida; Rivalry	W 72–57	16–9 (7–6)	CFE Arena (4,310); Orlando, FL
Feb 17, 2018; 11:00 am, ESPNU		SMU	W 52–37	17–9 (8–6)	CFE Arena (4,016); Orlando, FL
Feb 21, 2018; 9:00 pm, ESPNews		at Tulsa	L 61–70	17–10 (8–7)	Reynolds Center (3,342); Tulsa, OK
Feb 25, 2018; 2:00 pm, ESPNU		at Temple	L 56–75	17–11 (8–8)	Liacouras Center (7,119); Philadelphia, PA
Mar 1, 2018; 7:00 pm, ESPN		No. 11 Wichita State	L 71-75 ^{OT}	17–12 (8–9)	CFE Arena (5,930); Orlando, FL
Mar 4, 2018; 4:30 pm, ESPNU		Tulane	W 60–51	18–12 (9–9)	CFE Arena (4,420); Orlando, FL
American Athletic Conference tournament
Mar 8, 2018; 8:30 p:m, ESPNU	(6)	vs. (11) East Carolina; First Round	W 66–52	19–12	Amway Center (7,918); Orlando, FL
Mar 9, 2018; 9:00 p:m, ESPNU	(6)	vs. (3) No. 21 Houston; Quarterfinals	L 56–84	19–13	Amway Center (8,680); Orlando, FL
*Non-conference game. ^{#}Rankings from AP Poll. (#) Tournament seedings in parentheses. All times are in Eastern Time.
