= 2018 American Athletic Conference men's basketball tournament =

- Tournament Logo
- Classification: Division I
- Season: 2017–18
- Teams: 12
- Site: Amway Center; Orlando, Florida
- Champions: Cincinnati (1st title)
- Winning coach: Mick Cronin (1st title)
- MVP: Gary Clark (Cincinnati)
- Attendance: 50,259
- Television: CBS, ESPNU, ESPN2

2017–18 American Athletic Conference men's basketball standings
	Conf.				Overall
Team	W		L	PCT	W		L	PCT
No. 6 Cincinnati †	16	–	2	.889	31	–	5	.861
No. 16 Wichita State	14	–	4	.778	25	–	8	.758
No. 21 Houston	14	–	4	.778	27	–	8	.771
Tulsa	12	–	6	.667	19	–	12	.613
Memphis	10	–	8	.556	21	–	13	.618
UCF	9	–	9	.500	19	–	13	.594
Temple	8	–	10	.444	17	–	16	.515
UConn	7	–	11	.389	14	–	18	.438
SMU	6	–	12	.333	17	–	16	.515
Tulane	5	–	13	.278	14	–	17	.452
East Carolina	4	–	14	.222	10	–	20	.333
South Florida	3	–	15	.167	10	–	22	.313
† 2018 AAC tournament winner Rankings from AP poll

The 2018 American Athletic Conference men's basketball tournament ended the 2017–18 season of the American Athletic Conference. It was held March 8–11, 2018, at the Amway Center in Orlando, Florida. Regular-season champion Cincinnati won the tournament and with it the league's automatic bid to the NCAA tournament.

== Seeds ==
All 12 conference teams participated in the conference tournament. The top four teams received a bye into the quarterfinals. Teams were seeded by record within the conference, with a tiebreaker system to seed teams with identical conference records. Tiebreakers: win–loss record, head-to-head record, record against the highest ranked team outside of the tied teams, record against the second highest ranked team outside of the tied teams, etc.

Seed	School	Conference	Tiebreaker
1	Cincinnati	16–2	
2	Wichita State	14–4	1–0 vs. Memphis
3	Houston	14–4	0–1 vs. Memphis
4	Tulsa	12–6	
5	Memphis	10–8	
6	UCF	9–9	
7	Temple	8–10	
8	UConn	7–11	
9	SMU	6–12	
10	Tulane	5–13	1–1 vs. Houston
11	East Carolina	5–13	0–2 vs. Houston
12	South Florida	3–15	

== Schedule ==
Game	Time	Matchup	Score	Television	Attendance
First round – Thursday, March 8
1	Noon	No. 8 UConn vs No. 9 SMU	73–80	ESPNU	7,856
2	2:30 pm	No. 5 Memphis vs No. 12 South Florida	79–77	ESPNU	7,856
3	7:00 pm	No. 7 Temple vs No. 10 Tulane	82–77	ESPNU	7,918
4	9:30 pm	No. 6 UCF vs No. 11 East Carolina	66–52	ESPNU	7,918
Quarterfinals – Friday, March 9
5	Noon	No. 1 Cincinnati vs No. 9 SMU	61–51	ESPN2	8,491
6	2:30 pm	No. 4 Tulsa vs No. 5 Memphis	64–67	ESPN2	8,491
7	7:00 pm	No. 2 Wichita State vs No. 7 Temple	89–81	ESPNU	8,680
8	9:30 pm	No. 3 Houston vs No. 6 UCF	84–56	ESPNU	8,680
Semifinals – Saturday, March 10
9	1:00 pm	No. 1 Cincinnati vs. No. 5 Memphis	70–60	CBS	8,644
10	3:30 pm	No. 2 Wichita State vs. No. 3 Houston	74-77	CBS	8,644
Championship – Sunday, March 11
11	3:00 pm	No. 1 Cincinnati vs. No. 3 Houston	56–55	CBS	8,670
Game times in ET. Rankings denote tournament seeding.

== Bracket ==
First round Thursday, March 8
8	UConn	73
9	SMU	80
5	Memphis	79
12	South Florida	77
7	Temple	82
10	Tulane	77
6	UCF	66
11	East Carolina	52

Quarterfinals; Friday, March 9
1	Cincinnati	61
9	SMU	51
4	Tulsa	64
5	Memphis	67
2	Wichita State	89
7	Temple	81
3	Houston	84
6	UCF	56

Semifinals; Saturday, March 10
1	Cincinnati	70
5	Memphis	60
2	Wichita State	74
3	Houston	77

Championship; Sunday, March 11
1	Cincinnati	56
3	Houston	55
