= 2017–18 SMU Mustangs men's basketball team =

American college basketball season

2017–18 SMU Mustangs men's basketball
- Conference: American Athletic Conference
- Record: 17–16 (6–12 AAC)
- Head coach: Tim Jankovich (2nd season)
- Assistant coaches: K. T. Turner; Shawn Forrest; Jay Duncan
- Home arena: Moody Coliseum

2017–18 American Athletic Conference men's basketball standings
	Conf.				Overall
Team	W		L	PCT	W		L	PCT
No. 6 Cincinnati †	16	–	2	.889	31	–	5	.861
No. 16 Wichita State	14	–	4	.778	25	–	8	.758
No. 21 Houston	14	–	4	.778	27	–	8	.771
Tulsa	12	–	6	.667	19	–	12	.613
Memphis	10	–	8	.556	21	–	13	.618
UCF	9	–	9	.500	19	–	13	.594
Temple	8	–	10	.444	17	–	16	.515
UConn	7	–	11	.389	14	–	18	.438
SMU	6	–	12	.333	17	–	16	.515
Tulane	5	–	13	.278	14	–	17	.452
East Carolina	4	–	14	.222	10	–	20	.333
South Florida	3	–	15	.167	10	–	22	.313
† 2018 AAC tournament winner Rankings from AP poll

The 2017–18 SMU Mustangs men's basketball team represented Southern Methodist University during the 2017–18 NCAA Division I men's basketball season. The Mustangs were led by second-year head coach Tim Jankovich and played their home games at Moody Coliseum on their campus in University Park, Texas as members of the American Athletic Conference. They finished the season 17–16, 6–12 in AAC play to finish in ninth place. In the AAC tournament, they defeated UConn before losing to Cincinnati in the quarterfinals.

== Previous season ==
The Mustangs finished the 2015–16 season 30–5, 17–1 in AAC play to win the AAC regular season championship. In the AAC tournament, they defeated East Carolina, UCF, and Cincinnati to win the tournament championship. As a result, they received the conference's automatic bid to the NCAA tournament. As the No. 6 seed in the East region, were upset in the first round by No. 11 USC.

== Offseason ==
=== Departures ===
Name	Number	Pos.	Height	Weight	Year	Hometown	Reason for departure
Ben Moore	00	F	6'8"	220	Senior	Bolingbrook, IL	Graduated
Sterling Brown	3	G	6'6"	230	Senior	Maywood, IL	Graduated; selected 46th overall by the Philadelphia 76ers in the NBA draft
Dashawn McDowell	5	G	6'5"	185	Freshman	Oklahoma City, OK	Transferred to Seattle
Courtland Sutton	14	F	6'4"	215	RS Sophomore	Brenham, TX	Walk-on; didn't make the roster
Leo Kontopoulos	15	F	6'9"	210	Freshman	Frankfurt, Germany	Walk-on; didn't make the roster
Semi Ojeleye	33	F	6'7"	235	RS Junior	Ottawa, KS	Declared for NBA draft; selected 37th overall by the Boston Celtics

=== Incoming transfers ===
Name	Number	Pos.	Height	Weight	Year	Hometown	Notes
Jahmal McMurray	0	G	6'0"	165	Junior	Topeka, KS	Transferred from South Florida. Under NCAA transfer rules, McMurray will have to sit out for the 2017–18 season. Will have two years of remaining eligibility.
Isiaha Mike	15	F	6'8"	200	Sophomore	Scarborough, ON	Transferred from Duquesne. Under NCAA transfer rules, Mike will have to sit out for the 2017–18 season. Will have three years of remaining eligibility.
Akoy Agau	23	F	6'8"	235	RS Senior	Omaha, NE	Transferred from Georgetown. Will be eligible to play immediately since Agau graduated from Georgetown.

=== 2017 recruiting class ===
College recruiting
Name	Hometown	School	Height	Weight	Commit date
Elijah Landrum #28 PG	Tulsa, OK	Tulsa Central High School	6 ft 0 in (1.83 m)	180 lb (82 kg)	Sep 12, 2016
Elijah Landrum #28 PG	Recruit ratings: Scout: Rivals: 247Sports: (81)				
Ethan Chargois #38 C	Union City, OK	Union City High School	6 ft 9 in (2.06 m)	235 lb (107 kg)	Oct 1, 2016
Ethan Chargois #38 C	Recruit ratings: Scout: Rivals: 247Sports: (78)				
Everett Ray; PF	Addison, TX	Trinity Christian Academy	6 ft 8 in (2.03 m)	220 lb (100 kg)	Sep 22, 2016
Everett Ray; PF	Recruit ratings: Scout: Rivals: 247Sports: (NR)				
William Douglas; SF	Memphis, TN	Christian Brother	6 ft 5 in (1.96 m)	175 lb (79 kg)	Oct 7, 2016
William Douglas; SF	Recruit ratings: Scout: Rivals: 247Sports: (NR)				
Overall recruit ranking:
Note: In many cases, Scout, Rivals, 247Sports, On3, and ESPN may conflict in their listings of height and weight.; In these cases, the average was taken. ESPN grades are on a 100-point scale.; Sources: "2017 SMU Recruiting List". Rivals.; "2017 SMU Recruiting List". Scout.; "2017 SMU Recruiting List". ESPN.; "Scout.com Team Recruiting Rankings". Scout.; "2017 Team Ranking". Rivals.

=== 2018 recruiting class ===
College recruiting (2018)
Name	Hometown	School	Height	Weight	Commit date
Jahmar Young Jr. C	DeSoto, TX	DeSoto High School	6 ft 9 in (2.06 m)	197 lb (89 kg)	Aug 18, 2017
Jahmar Young Jr. C	Recruit ratings: Scout: Rivals: 247Sports: (NR)				
Feron Hunt; SF	DeSoto, TX	DeSoto High School	6 ft 7 in (2.01 m)	190 lb (86 kg)	Nov 9, 2017
Feron Hunt; SF	Recruit ratings: Scout: Rivals: 247Sports: (0)				
Overall recruit ranking:
Note: In many cases, Scout, Rivals, 247Sports, On3, and ESPN may conflict in their listings of height and weight.; In these cases, the average was taken. ESPN grades are on a 100-point scale.; Sources: "2018 SMU Recruiting List". Rivals.; "2018 SMU Recruiting List". Scout.; "2018 SMU Recruiting List". ESPN.; "Scout.com Team Recruiting Rankings". Scout.; "2018 Team Ranking". Rivals.

== Preseason ==
At the conference's annual media day, the Mustangs were picked to finish in fourth place in the AAC. Junior guard Shake Milton was named the conference's preseason Player of the Year.

== Roster ==
2017–18 SMU Mustangs men's basketball team
Players
Coaches

Pos.	#	Name	Height	Weight	Year	Previous school	Hometown
G	0	Jahmal McMurray	6 ft 0 in (1.83 m)	175 lb (79 kg)	Jr	South Florida	Topeka, Kansas
G	1	Shake Milton	6 ft 6 in (1.98 m)	205 lb (93 kg)	Jr	Owasso High School	Owasso, Oklahoma
G	3	William Douglas	6 ft 5 in (1.96 m)	180 lb (82 kg)	Fr	Christian Brothers High School	Memphis, Tennessee
F	5	Ethan Chargois	6 ft 9 in (2.06 m)	235 lb (107 kg)	Fr	Union High School	Tulsa, Oklahoma
G	10	Jarrey Foster (injured)	6 ft 6 in (1.98 m)	220 lb (100 kg)	Jr	North Shore Senior High School	Houston, Texas
G	12	James Pyle (W)	6 ft 3 in (1.91 m)	175 lb (79 kg)	So	St. Thomas Aquinas High School	Overland Park, Kansas
F	15	Isiaha Mike (I) (redshirt)	6 ft 8 in (2.03 m)	200 lb (91 kg)	So	Duquesne	Scarborough, Ontario
G	20	Elijah Landrum	6 ft 0 in (1.83 m)	180 lb (82 kg)	Fr	Central High School	Tulsa, Oklahoma
G	21	Ben Emelogu	6 ft 5 in (1.96 m)	215 lb (98 kg)	RS Sr	Virginia Tech	Grand Prairie, Texas
G	22	Luke Wilfong (W)	6 ft 1 in (1.85 m)	175 lb (79 kg)	Fr	Memphis University School	Memphis, Tennessee
F	23	Akoy Agau	6 ft 8 in (2.03 m)	235 lb (107 kg)	RS Sr	Georgetown	Omaha, Nebraska
F	24	Everett Ray (injured)	6 ft 7 in (2.01 m)	220 lb (100 kg)	Fr	Trinity Christian Academy	Addison, Texas
G	31	Jimmy Whitt	6 ft 3 in (1.91 m)	175 lb (79 kg)	RS So	Arkansas	Columbia, Missouri

Head coach

- Tim Jankovich (Kansas State)

Assistant coach(es)

- K. T. Turner (Oklahoma City)
- Shawn Forrest (Arkansas–Pine Bluff)
- Jay Duncan (Northwood)

Legend

- (C) Team captain
- (S) Suspended
- (I) Ineligible
- (W) Walk-on
- Injured
- Current redshirt

Roster

== Schedule and results ==
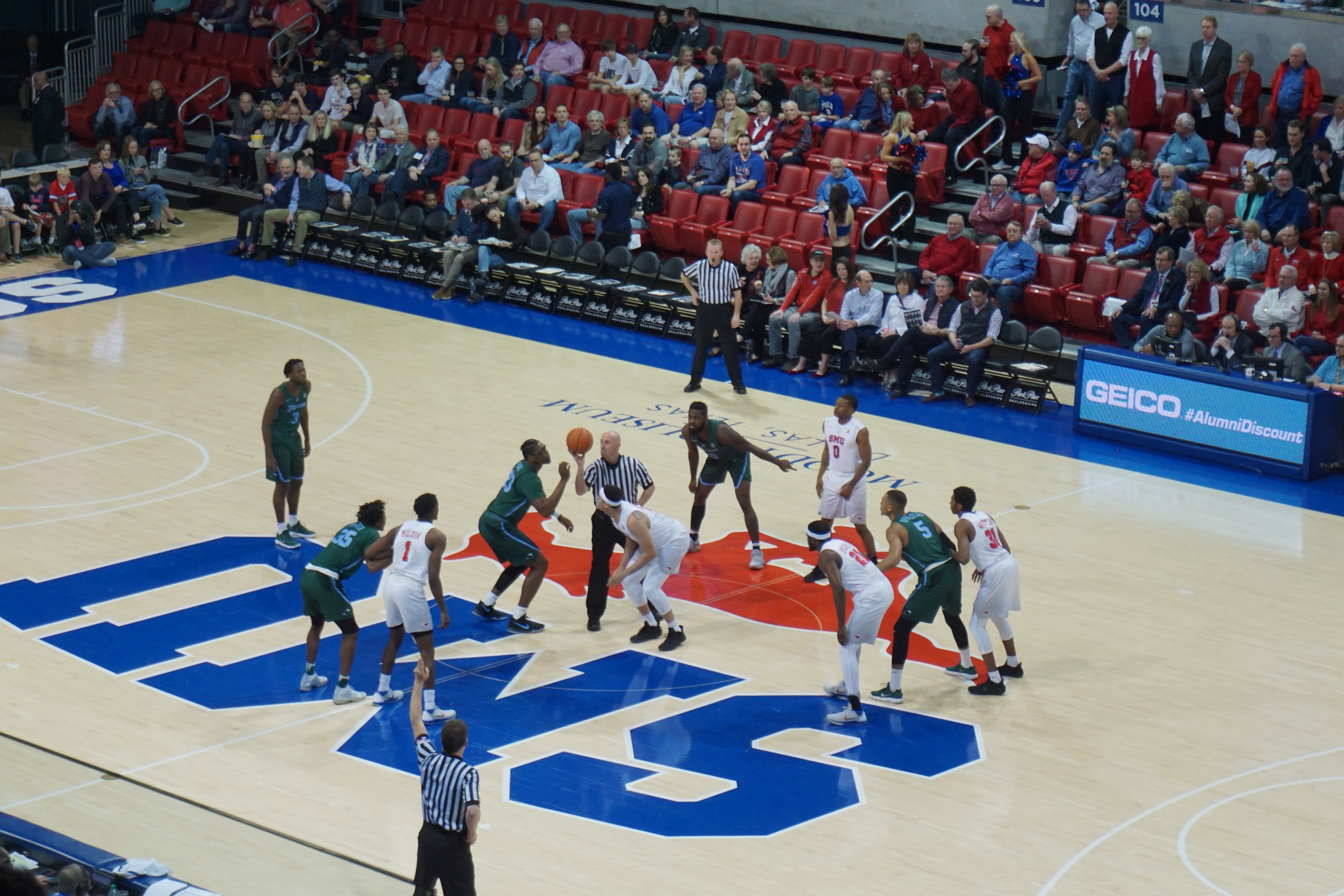
SMU in action against the Tulane Green Wave

Date time, TV	Rank^{#}	Opponent^{#}	Result	Record	Site (attendance) city, state
Non-conference regular season
Nov 10, 2017*; 7:00 pm, ESPN3		UMBC; Battle 4 Atlantis campus-site game	W 78–67	1–0	Moody Coliseum (6,841); Dallas, TX
Nov 12, 2017*; 3:00 pm, ESPN3		Louisiana–Monroe	W 83–65	2–0	Moody Coliseum (6,622); Dallas, TX
Nov 15, 2017*; 7:00 pm, ESPN3		Northwestern State	W 81–45	3–0	Moody Coliseum (6,769); Dallas, TX
Nov 18, 2017*; 7:00 pm, ESPN3		Arkansas–Pine Bluff	W 72–37	4–0	Moody Coliseum (6,738); Dallas, TX
Nov 22, 2017*; 8:30 pm, ESPN3		vs. Northern Iowa; Battle 4 Atlantis quarterfinals	L 58–61	4–1	Imperial Arena (909); Nassau, Bahamas
Nov 23, 2017*; 8:30 pm, ESPN3		vs. No. 2 Arizona; Battle 4 Atlantis consolation 2nd round	W 66–60	5–1	Imperial Arena (1,236); Nassau, Bahamas
Nov 24, 2017*; 6:00 pm, ESPN3		vs. Western Kentucky; Battle 4 Atlantis 5th place game	L 61–63	5–2	Imperial Arena (1,252); Nassau, Bahamas
Nov 28, 2017*; 7:00 pm, ESPN3		Texas–Rio Grande Valley	W 95–64	6–2	Moody Coliseum (6,326); Dallas, TX
Dec 2, 2017*; 9:00 pm, ESPNU		No. 14 USC	W 72–55	7–2	Moody Coliseum (6,918); Dallas, TX
Dec 5, 2017*; 8:00 pm, FSSW+		at No. 20 TCU	L 83–94	7–3	Schollmaier Arena (6,840); Fort Worth, TX
Dec 13, 2017*; 8:00 pm, ESPN3		New Orleans	W 79–66	8–3	Moody Coliseum (6,512); Dallas, TX
Dec 18, 2017*; 8:00 pm, ESPNU		Boise State	W 86–63	9–3	Moody Coliseum (6,551); Dallas, TX
Dec 19, 2017*; 7:00 pm, ESPN3		Cal Poly	W 84–64	10–3	Moody Coliseum (6,480); Dallas, TX
AAC regular season
Dec 27, 2017; 8:00 pm, ESPN2		UCF	W 56–51	11–3 (1–0)	Moody Coliseum (6,628); Dallas, TX
Dec 31, 2017; 7:00 pm, ESPNU		South Florida	W 79–39	12–3 (2–0)	Moody Coliseum (6,477); Dallas, TX
Jan 4, 2018; 8:00 pm, ESPNU		at Tulane	L 70–73	12–4 (2–1)	Devlin Fieldhouse (1,512); New Orleans, LA
Jan 7, 2018; 5:00 pm, ESPN2		at No. 19 Cincinnati	L 56–76	12–5 (2–2)	BB&T Arena (9,109); Highland Heights, KY
Jan 10, 2018; 8:00 pm, CBSSN		Temple	L 64–66	12–6 (2–3)	Moody Coliseum (6,471); Dallas, TX
Jan 17, 2018; 6:00 pm, ESPNU		at No. 7 Wichita State	W 83–78	13–6 (3–3)	Charles Koch Arena (10,506); Wichita, KS
Jan 20, 2018; 5:00 pm, ESPNews		Tulane	W 73–62	14–6 (4–3)	Moody Coliseum (6,814); Dallas, TX
Jan 25, 2018; 6:00 pm, CBSSN		at UConn	L 52–63	14–7 (4–4)	Harry A. Gampel Pavilion (7,322); Storrs, CT
Jan 28, 2018; 1:00 pm, CBSSN		East Carolina	W 86–61	15–7 (5–4)	Moody Coliseum (6,544); Dallas, TX
Feb 1, 2018; 7:00 pm, CBSSN		at Tulsa	L 67–76	15–8 (5–5)	Reynolds Center (4,337); Tulsa, OK
Feb 8, 2018; 8:00 pm, ESPN2		at Houston	L 58–67	15–9 (5–6)	Toyota Center (3,547); Houston, TX
Feb 11, 2018; 3:00 pm, ESPN		No. 6 Cincinnati	L 51–76	15–10 (5–7)	Moody Coliseum (6,935); Dallas, TX
Feb 14, 2018; 8:00 pm, ESPNU		Memphis	L 67–70	15–11 (5–8)	Moody Coliseum (6,539); Dallas, TX
Feb 17, 2018; 10:00 am, ESPNU		at UCF	L 37–52	15–12 (5–9)	CFE Arena (4,016); Orlando, FL
Feb 21, 2018; 6:00 pm, ESPNews		at East Carolina	W 77–58	16–12 (6–9)	Williams Arena (2,923); Greenville, NC
Feb 24, 2018; 1:00 pm, ESPN		No. 13 Wichita State	L 78–84	16–13 (6–10)	Moody Coliseum (6,931); Dallas, TX
Feb 28, 2018; 8:00 pm, ESPN2		No. 25 Houston	L 56–69	16–14 (6–11)	Moody Coliseum (6,782); Dallas, TX
Mar 4, 2018; 1:00 pm, ESPNews		at South Florida	L 54–65	16–15 (6–12)	USF Sun Dome (2,593); Tampa, FL
AAC tournament
Mar 8, 2018; 11:00 am, ESPNU	(9)	vs. (8) UConn; First round	W 80–73	17–15	Amway Center (7,856); Orlando, FL
Mar 9, 2018; 11:00 am, ESPN2	(9)	vs. (1) No. 8 Cincinnati; Quarterfinals	L 51–61	17–16	Amway Center (8,491); Orlando, FL
*Non-conference game. ^{#}Rankings from AP Poll. (#) Tournament seedings in parentheses. All times are in Central Time.
