= 2017–18 East Carolina Pirates men's basketball team =

American college basketball season

2017–18 East Carolina Pirates men's basketball
- Conference: American Athletic Conference
- Record: 10–20 (4–14 AAC)
- Head coach: Jeff Lebo (First 6 games); Michael Perry (interim)
- Assistant coaches: Ken Potosnak; Doug Wojcik
- Home arena: Williams Arena (8,000)

2017–18 American Athletic Conference men's basketball standings
	Conf.				Overall
Team	W		L	PCT	W		L	PCT
No. 6 Cincinnati †	16	–	2	.889	31	–	5	.861
No. 21 Houston	14	–	4	.778	27	–	8	.771
No. 16 Wichita State	14	–	4	.778	25	–	8	.758
Tulsa	12	–	6	.667	19	–	12	.613
Memphis	10	–	8	.556	21	–	13	.618
UCF	9	–	9	.500	19	–	13	.594
Temple	8	–	10	.444	17	–	16	.515
UConn	7	–	11	.389	14	–	18	.438
SMU	6	–	12	.333	17	–	16	.515
Tulane	5	–	13	.278	14	–	17	.452
East Carolina	4	–	14	.222	10	–	20	.333
South Florida	3	–	15	.167	10	–	22	.313
† 2018 AAC tournament winner Rankings from AP poll

The 2017–18 East Carolina Pirates men's basketball team represented East Carolina University during the 2017–18 NCAA Division I men's basketball season. The Pirates were led by interim head coach Michael Perry and played their home games at Williams Arena at Minges Coliseum as fourth-year members of the American Athletic Conference. They finished the season 10–20, 4–14 in AAC play to finish in 11th place. They lost in the first round of the AAC tournament to UCF.

Following a 2–4 start to the season, eighth-year head coach Jeff Lebo announced his resignation from ECU on November 29, 2017 and Perry was named interim head coach. On April 4, 2018 the school announced that Florida Gulf Coast head coach Joe Dooley, who coached the Pirates from 1995 to 1999, would return as head coach.

== Previous season ==
The Pirates finished the 2016–17 season 15–18, 6–12 in AAC play to finish in ninth place. They defeated Temple in the first round of the AAC tournament to advance to the quarterfinals where they lost to SMU.

On January 16, 2017, head coach Jeff Lebo underwent hip surgery and was unable to coach for the rest of the season. Assistant coach Michael Perry took over as acting head coach beginning with the January 22 game.

== Offseason ==
=== Departures ===
Name	Number	Pos.	Height	Weight	Year	Hometown	Reason for departure
Deng Riak	0	C	6'10"	225	Sophomore	Melbourne, Australia	Transferred to Akron
Caleb White	2	G	6'7"	205	Senior	Buckingham, VA	Graduated
Elijah Hughes	4	G	6'6"	220	Freshman	Somers, NY	Transferred to Syracuse
Michel Nzege	13	F	6'8"	220	RS Senior	Geneva, Switzerland	Graduated
Clarence Williams	23	F	6'8"	195	Senior	Tallahassee, FL	Graduated
Andre Washington	31	C	7'1"	235	Senior	Roanoke, VA	Graduated

=== Incoming transfers ===
Name	Number	Pos.	Height	Weight	Year	Hometown	Previous School
Seth LeDay	3	F	6'7"	200	Junior	The Colony, TX	Transferred from Virginia Tech. Under NCAA transfer rules, LeDay will have to sit out for the 2017–18 season. Will have two years of remaining eligibility.
Aaron Jackson	10	G	6'8"	215	RS Senior	Gahanna, OH	Transferred from Akron. Will be eligible to play immediately since Jackson graduated from Akron.
Usman Haruna	35	C	7'0"	220	Junior	Kaduna, Nigeria	Junior college transferred from Bismarck State College

=== Recruiting class of 2017 ===
College recruiting information
Name	Hometown	School	Height	Weight	Commit date
K.J. Davis #87 SF	Portsmouth, VA	I. C. Norcom High School	6 ft 5 in (1.96 m)	N/A	Aug 3, 2016
K.J. Davis #87 SF	Recruit ratings: Scout: Rivals: (NR)				
Justin Whatley; SF	Chesapeake, VA	Oscar Smith High School	6 ft 6 in (1.98 m)	180 lb (82 kg)	Aug 2, 2017
Justin Whatley; SF	Recruit ratings: Scout: Rivals: (NR)				
Dimitri Spasojevic; SF	Vršac, Serbia	Gimnazija Čačak	6 ft 8 in (2.03 m)	230 lb (100 kg)	Oct 24, 2017
Dimitri Spasojevic; SF	Recruit ratings: Scout: Rivals: (NR)				
Overall recruit ranking:
Note: In many cases, Scout, Rivals, 247Sports, On3, and ESPN may conflict in their listings of height and weight.; In these cases, the average was taken. ESPN grades are on a 100-point scale.; Sources: "2017 Team Ranking". Rivals.

=== Recruiting class of 2018 ===
College recruiting information (2017)
Name	Hometown	School	Height	Weight	Commit date
DeShaun Wade #72 SG	Virginia Beach, VA	The Miller School	6 ft 2 in (1.88 m)	190 lb (86 kg)	Jun 19, 2017
DeShaun Wade #72 SG	Recruit ratings: Scout: Rivals: 247Sports: (66)				
Jayden Gardner; PF	Wake Forest, NC	Heritage High School	6 ft 8 in (2.03 m)	225 lb (102 kg)	Sep 24, 2017
Jayden Gardner; PF	Recruit ratings: Scout: Rivals: 247Sports: (NR)				
Rico Quinton; C	Newbern, TN	Dyer County	6 ft 10 in (2.08 m)	200 lb (91 kg)	Nov 21, 2017
Rico Quinton; C	Recruit ratings: Scout: Rivals: 247Sports: (NR)				
Overall recruit ranking:
Note: In many cases, Scout, Rivals, 247Sports, On3, and ESPN may conflict in their listings of height and weight.; In these cases, the average was taken. ESPN grades are on a 100-point scale.; Sources: "2018 Team Ranking". Rivals.

== Roster ==
2017–18 East Carolina Pirates men's basketball team
Players
Coaches

Pos.	#	Name	Height	Weight	Year	Previous school	Hometown
G	0	Isaac Fleming	6 ft 3 in (1.91 m)	215 lb (98 kg)	RS Jr	National Christian Academy; Hawaii	Wilmington, DE
G	1	Jeremy Sheppard (redshirt)	6 ft 1 in (1.85 m)	160 lb (73 kg)	So	John Marshall	Richmond, VA
G	2	K. J. Davis	6 ft 5 in (1.96 m)	185 lb (84 kg)	Fr	I. C. Norcom	Portsmouth, VA
F	3	Seth LeDay (redshirt)	6 ft 7 in (2.01 m)	200 lb (91 kg)	Jr	The Colony; Virginia Tech	The Colony, TX
G	10	Aaron Jackson	6 ft 6 in (1.98 m)	215 lb (98 kg)	RS Sr	Lincoln HS; Akron	Gahanna, OH
F	13	Justin Whatley	6 ft 8 in (2.03 m)	235 lb (107 kg)	Fr	Oscar Smith	Chesapeake, VA
G/F	15	Kentrell Barkley	6 ft 5 in (1.96 m)	205 lb (93 kg)	Jr	Northern	Durham, NC
G	21	B. J. Tyson	6 ft 3 in (1.91 m)	190 lb (86 kg)	Sr	Anson	Wadesboro, NC
G	24	John Whitley (W)	5 ft 11 in (1.8 m)	160 lb (73 kg)	So	Washington	Washington, D.C.
F/C	25	Jabari Craig (injured)	6 ft 10 in (2.08 m)	235 lb (107 kg)	Sr	Tucker; Pearl River CC	Maumelle, AR
F	32	Dimitri Spasojevic	6 ft 8 in (2.03 m)	230 lb (104 kg)	Fr	Gimnazija Čačak	Vršac, Serbia
F/C	35	Usman Haruna	6 ft 11 in (2.11 m)	215 lb (98 kg)	Jr	Bismarck State College	Kaduna, Nigeria
G	41	Addison Hill (W)	6 ft 3 in (1.91 m)	175 lb (79 kg)	Jr	South Central	Winterville, NC
G	52	Justice Obasohan (W)	6 ft 5 in (1.96 m)	215 lb (98 kg)	Jr	NC School of Science and Math	Wallace, NC
G	55	Shawn Williams	6 ft 0 in (1.83 m)	180 lb (82 kg)	RS Fr	Southwest Christian Academy	Maumelle, AR

Head coach

- Michael Perry (Richmond)

Assistant coach(es)

- Ken Potosnak (Randolph–Macon)
- Doug Wojcik (Navy)

Legend

- (C) Team captain
- (S) Suspended
- (I) Ineligible
- (W) Walk-on
- Injured
- Current redshirt

Roster

== Schedule and results ==
Date time, TV	Rank^{#}	Opponent^{#}	Result	Record	Site (attendance) city, state
Non-conference regular season
Nov 12, 2017*; 5:00 pm		Coppin State; Showcase on the Banks	W 76–50	1–0	Williams Arena (3,228); Greenville, NC
Nov 15, 2017*; 7:00 pm, ESPN3		Radford	L 66–73	1–1	Williams Arena (3,384); Greenville, NC
Nov 17, 2017*; 7:00 pm, ESPN3		Central Connecticut; Showcase on the Banks	L 68–79	1–2	Williams Arena (3,042); Greenville, NC
Nov 20, 2017*; 7:00 pm, ESPN3		Cleveland State; Showcase on the Banks	W 72–69	2–2	Williams Arena (2,907); Greenville, NC
Nov 24, 2017*; 1:00 pm, BTN Plus		at Rutgers; Showcase on the Banks	L 47–61	2–3	Louis Brown Athletic Center (4,336); Piscataway, NJ
Nov 26, 2017*; 4:00 pm, ESPN3		North Carolina A&T	L 81–87	2–4	Williams Arena (3,373); Greenville, NC
Nov 30, 2017*; 8:00 pm, ESPN3		UNC Wilmington	W 93–88 ^{OT}	3–4	Williams Arena (3,373); Greenville, NC
Dec 2, 2017*; 5:00 pm		Delaware State	W 63–57	4–4	Williams Arena (3,195); Greenville, NC
Dec 4, 2017*; 7:00 pm, ESPN3		Campbell	W 69–66	5–4	Williams Arena (2,980); Greenville, NC
Dec 18, 2017*; 7:00 pm, ESPN3		Charlotte	L 50–69	5–5	Williams Arena (3,162); Greenville, NC
Dec 21, 2017*; 7:00 pm		Grambling State	W 76–68	6–5	Williams Arena (3,302); Greenville, NC
AAC regular season
Dec 28, 2017; 5:00 pm, ESPNU		at Tulsa	L 53–79	6–6 (0–1)	Reynolds Center (8,355); Tulsa, OK
Dec 31, 2017; 4:00 pm, ESPNews		UCF	L 39–59	6–7 (0–2)	Williams Arena (2,946); Greenville, NC
Jan 3, 2018; 4:00 pm, ESPN3		at South Florida	W 67–65	7–7 (1–2)	USF Sun Dome (2,148); Tampa, FL
Jan 6, 2018; 12:00 pm, ESPNews		at UConn	L 65–70	7–8 (1–3)	XL Center (6,717); Hartford, CT
Jan 11, 2018; 9:00 pm, ESPN2		No. 5 Wichita State	L 60–95	7–9 (1–4)	Williams Arena (5,539); Greenville, NC
Jan 14, 2018; 2:00 pm, ESPN3		Houston	L 49–65	7–10 (1–5)	Williams Arena (3,549); Greenville, NC
Jan 17, 2018; 7:00 pm, ESPN3		South Florida	W 90–52	8–10 (2–5)	Williams Arena (2,857); Greenville, NC
Jan 20, 2018; 4:00 pm, ESPNews		at No. 12 Cincinnati	L 60–86	8–11 (2–6)	BB&T Arena (8,879); Highland Heights, KY
Jan 28, 2018; 2:00 pm, CBSSN		at SMU	L 61–86	8–12 (2–7)	Moody Coliseum (6,544); Dallas, TX
Jan 31, 2018; 6:30 pm, ESPNews		Tulane	L 69–71 ^{OT}	8–13 (2–8)	Williams Arena (3,072); Greenville, NC
Feb 3, 2018; 2:00 pm, ESPNews		Memphis	W 88–85 ^{OT}	9–13 (3–8)	Williams Arena (3,338); Greenville, NC
Feb 7, 2018; 7:00 pm, ESPNews		at Temple	L 73–90	9–14 (3–9)	Liacouras Center (5,282); Philadelphia, PA
Feb 14, 2018; 8:00 pm, ESPNews		at Tulane	W 82–80	10–14 (4–9)	Devlin Fieldhouse (1,098); New Orleans, LA
Feb 18, 2018; 3:00 pm, ESPNews		UConn	L 80–84	10–15 (4–10)	Williams Arena (4,524); Greenville, NC
Feb 21, 2018; 7:00 pm, ESPNews		SMU	L 58–77	10–16 (4–11)	Williams Arena (2,923); Greenville, NC
Feb 25, 2018; 3:00 pm, ESPN3		at No. 23 Houston	L 58–109	10–17 (4–12)	Toyota Center (3,602); Houston, TX
Mar 1, 2018; 7:00 pm, ESPNU		Tulsa	L 58–72	10–18 (4–13)	Williams Arena (3,205); Greenville, NC
Mar 4, 2018; 3:00 pm, ESPN3		at Memphis	L 70–90	10–19 (4–14)	FedEx Forum (6,474); Memphis, TN
AAC tournament
Mar 8, 2018; 8:30 p:m, ESPNU	(11)	vs. (6) UCF; First Round	L 52–66	10–20	Amway Center (7,918); Orlando, FL
*Non-conference game. ^{#}Rankings from AP Poll. (#) Tournament seedings in parentheses. All times are in Eastern Time.
