= 2017–18 Tulane Green Wave men's basketball team =

American college basketball season

2017–18 Tulane Green Wave men's basketball
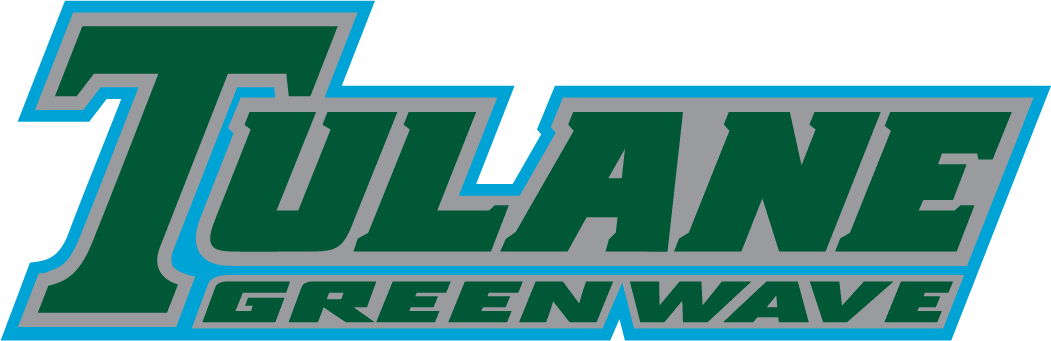
- Conference: American Athletic Conference
- Record: 14–17 (5–13 AAC)
- Head coach: Mike Dunleavy Sr. (2nd season)
- Assistant coaches: Doug Stewart; Anthony Wilkins; Raman Sposato
- Home arena: Devlin Fieldhouse

2017–18 American Athletic Conference men's basketball standings
	Conf.				Overall
Team	W		L	PCT	W		L	PCT
No. 6 Cincinnati †	16	–	2	.889	31	–	5	.861
No. 16 Wichita State	14	–	4	.778	25	–	8	.758
No. 21 Houston	14	–	4	.778	27	–	8	.771
Tulsa	12	–	6	.667	19	–	12	.613
Memphis	10	–	8	.556	21	–	13	.618
UCF	9	–	9	.500	19	–	13	.594
Temple	8	–	10	.444	17	–	16	.515
UConn	7	–	11	.389	14	–	18	.438
SMU	6	–	12	.333	17	–	16	.515
Tulane	5	–	13	.278	14	–	17	.452
East Carolina	4	–	14	.222	10	–	20	.333
South Florida	3	–	15	.167	10	–	22	.313
† 2018 AAC tournament winner Rankings from AP poll

The 2017–18 Tulane Green Wave men's basketball team represented Tulane University during the 2017–18 NCAA Division I men's basketball season. The Green Wave, led by second-year head coach Mike Dunleavy Sr., played their home games at Devlin Fieldhouse in New Orleans, Louisiana as fourth-year members of the American Athletic Conference. They finished the season 14–17, 5–13 in AAC play to finish in 10th place. They lost in the first round of the AAC tournament to Temple.

== Previous season ==
The Green Wave finished the season 6–25, 3–15 in AAC play to finish in tenth place. They lost in the first round of the AAC tournament to Tulsa.

== Offseason ==
=== Departures ===
Name	Number	Pos.	Height	Weight	Year	Hometown	Reason for departure
Von Julien	10	G	6'1"	160	Sophomore	Reserve, LA	Transferred to Southeastern Louisiana
Kain Harris	11	G	6'4"	210	Sophomore	Chicago, IL	Transferred to Kent State
Malik Morgan	13	G	6'4"	205	RS Senior	River Ridge, LA	Graduated
Ryan Smith	15	C	6'10"	250	Senior	Wildomar, CA	Graduated
Darian Jones	22	F	6'8"	185	Freshman	Brusly, LA	Transferred to Florida A&M

=== 2017 recruiting class ===
College recruiting
Name	Hometown	School	Height	Weight	Commit date
Bul Ajang #50 C	The Patrick School	Elizabeth, NJ	6 ft 10 in (2.08 m)	220 lb (100 kg)	Nov 5, 2016
Bul Ajang #50 C	Recruit ratings: Scout: Rivals: (72)				
Buay Koka #69	The Patrick School	Elizabeth, NJ	7 ft 0 in (2.13 m)	220 lb (100 kg)	Nov 5, 2016
Buay Koka #69	Recruit ratings: Scout: Rivals: (63)				
Caleb Daniels; PG	New Orleans, LA	Saint Augustine High School	6 ft 4 in (1.93 m)	198 lb (90 kg)	
Caleb Daniels; PG	Recruit ratings: Scout: Rivals: (NR)				
Shakwon Barrett; PG	Toronto, ON	Tech Academy	6 ft 3 in (1.91 m)	N/A	Apr 26, 2017
Shakwon Barrett; PG	Recruit ratings: Scout: Rivals: (NR)				
Overall recruit ranking:
Note: In many cases, Scout, Rivals, 247Sports, On3, and ESPN may conflict in their listings of height and weight.; In these cases, the average was taken. ESPN grades are on a 100-point scale.; Sources: "2017 Team Ranking". Rivals.

=== 2018 recruiting class ===
College recruiting (2018)
Name	Hometown	School	Height	Weight	Commit date
Moses Wood #58 SF	Galena High School	Reno, NV	6 ft 10 in (2.08 m)	220 lb (100 kg)	Sep 21, 2017
Moses Wood #58 SF	Recruit ratings: Scout: Rivals: (78)				
Overall recruit ranking:
Note: In many cases, Scout, Rivals, 247Sports, On3, and ESPN may conflict in their listings of height and weight.; In these cases, the average was taken. ESPN grades are on a 100-point scale.; Sources: "2017 Team Ranking". Rivals.

== Roster ==
2017–18 Tulane Green Wave men's basketball team
Players
Coaches

Pos.	#	Name	Height	Weight	Year	Previous school	Hometown
G	0	Jordan Cornish	6 ft 6 in (1.98 m)	220 lb (100 kg)	RS Jr	Brother Martin; UNLV	New Orleans, LA
G	2	Jackson Johnson (W)	5 ft 10 in (1.78 m)	165 lb (75 kg)	Jr	Ponte Vedra	Ponte Vedra Beach, FL
G	3	Ray Ona Embo	6 ft 5 in (1.96 m)	188 lb (85 kg)	So	Quality Education Academy	Lognes, France
G	4	Riley Conroy (W)	5 ft 11 in (1.8 m)	182 lb (83 kg)	RS Jr	Jesuit	New Orleans, LA
G/F	5	Cameron Reynolds	6 ft 8 in (2.03 m)	225 lb (102 kg)	RS Sr	Pearland	Perland, TX
G	10	Caleb Daniels	6 ft 4 in (1.93 m)	205 lb (93 kg)	Fr	St. Augustine	New Orleans, LA
F	11	Bul Ajang	6 ft 10 in (2.08 m)	225 lb (102 kg)	Fr	The Patrick School	Jonglei, South Sudan
F	12	Sammis Reyes	6 ft 7 in (2.01 m)	240 lb (109 kg)	Jr	North Broward Prep; Palm Beach State	Santiago, Chile
C	13	Buay Koka	7 ft 0 in (2.13 m)	200 lb (91 kg)	Fr	The Patrick School	Nasir, South Sudan
G	14	Colin Slater	6 ft 1 in (1.85 m)	187 lb (85 kg)	So	Immanuel	Sanger, CA
F	21	Semir Sehic	6 ft 9 in (2.06 m)	240 lb (109 kg)	RS So	Cypress; Vanderbilt	Atlanta, GA
F	23	Blake Paul	6 ft 9 in (2.06 m)	250 lb (113 kg)	Jr	Landry-Walker	New Orleans, LA
G	24	Shakwon Barrett	6 ft 5 in (1.96 m)	180 lb (82 kg)	Fr	Tech Academy	Toronto, ON
G	30	Bernard Woodside (W)	6 ft 0 in (1.83 m)	185 lb (84 kg)	Jr	Tampa Prep; ASA College	Tampa, FL
G	32	Cameron Galic (W)	6 ft 6 in (1.98 m)	205 lb (93 kg)	Fr	Bethesda-Chevy Chase	Bethesda, MD
G	35	Melvin Frazier	6 ft 6 in (1.98 m)	200 lb (91 kg)	Jr	L. W. Higgins	Avondale, LA

Head coach

- Mike Dunleavy Sr. (South Carolina)

Assistant coach(es)

- Doug Stewart (Brown)
- Anthony Wilkins (Kent State)
- Raman Sposato (Oregon)

Legend

- (C) Team captain
- (S) Suspended
- (I) Ineligible
- (W) Walk-on
- Injured
- Current redshirt

Roster
Last update: January 18, 2018

== Schedule and results ==
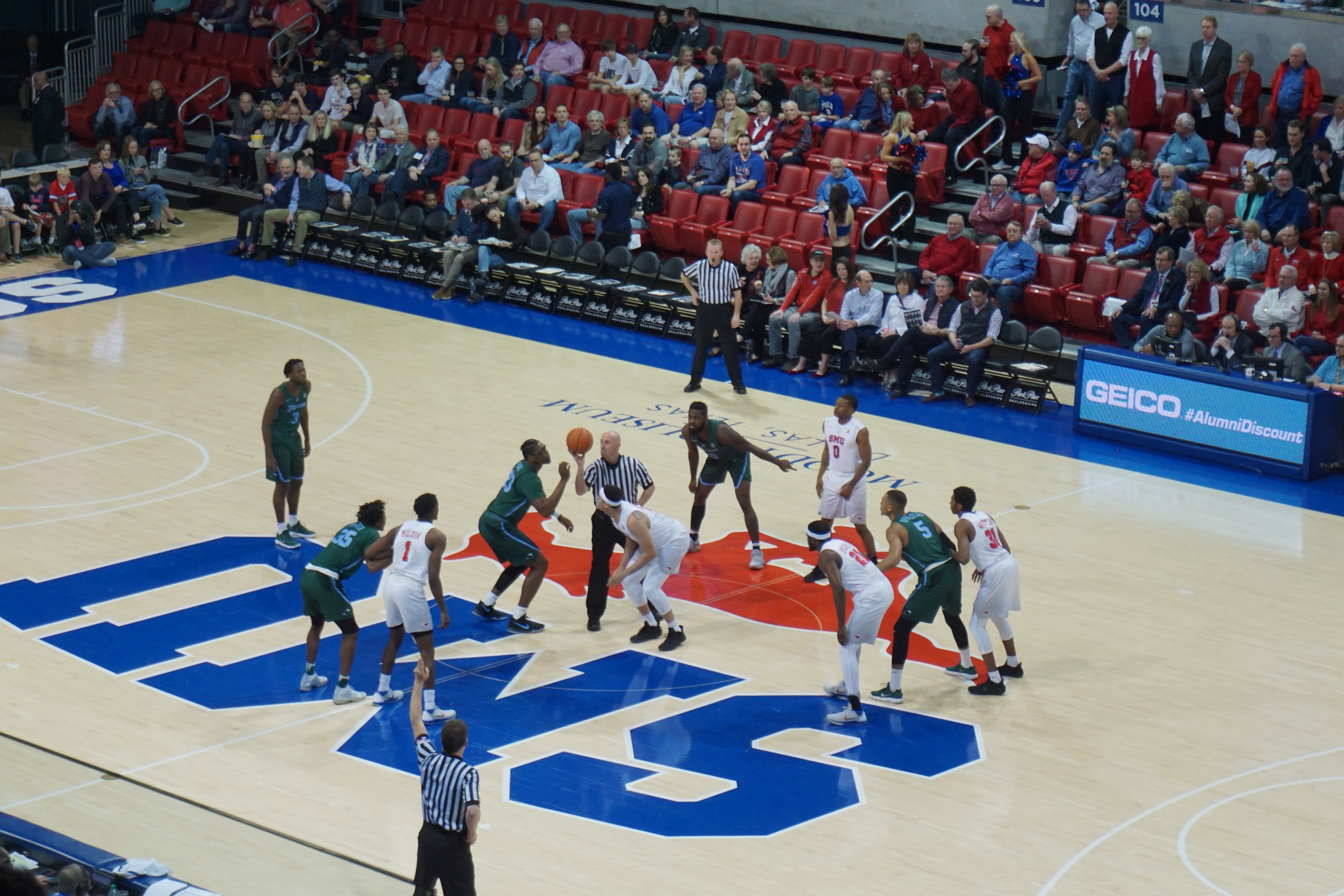
Tulane in action against the SMU Mustangs

Date time, TV	Rank^{#}	Opponent^{#}	Result	Record	Site (attendance) city, state
Exhibition
Oct 31, 2017*; 7:30 pm		LSU; Hurricane relief charity game	W 84–74		Devlin Fieldhouse (1,503); New Orleans, LA
Nov 2, 2017*; 7:00 pm		Loyola (New Orleans)	W 84–46		Devlin Fieldhouse (1,253); New Orleans, LA
Non-conference regular season
Nov 10, 2017*; 7:00 pm, ESPN3		LIU Brooklyn; Jamaica Classic	W 102–96	1–0	Devlin Fieldhouse (1,032); New Orleans, LA
Nov 13, 2017*; 7:00 pm, CST		Southeastern Louisiana	W 89–66	2–0	Devlin Fieldhouse (1,316); New Orleans, LA
Nov 17, 2017*; 1:00 pm, CBSSN		vs. Colorado State; Jamaica Classic	W 80–53	3–0	Montego Bay Convention Centre; Montego Bay, Jamaica
Nov 19, 2017*; 6:30 pm, CBSSN		vs. Fordham; Jamaica Classic	W 63–55	4–0	Montego Bay Convention Centre; Montego Bay, Jamaica
Nov 22, 2017*; 7:00 pm, ESPN3		Miami (OH); Jamaica Classic	W 80–59	5–0	Devlin Fieldhouse (1,537); New Orleans, LA
Nov 26, 2017*; 11:00 am, ESPN3		at Georgia State	L 59–70	5–1	GSU Sports Arena (971); Atlanta, GA
Nov 29, 2017*; 7:00 pm, CST		Alcorn State	W 81–65	6–1	Devlin Fieldhouse (1,427); New Orleans, LA
Dec 3, 2017*; 1:00 pm, ESPN2		at No. 13 North Carolina	L 73–97	6–2	Dean Smith Center (14,402); Chapel Hill, NC
Dec 6, 2017*; 12:00 pm, ESPN3		Southern	W 95–76	7–2	Devlin Fieldhouse (1,834); New Orleans, LA
Dec 10, 2017*; 11:00 am, ESPNU		vs. Florida State; Heritage Insurance Classic	L 53–72	7–3	Amalie Arena (3,975); Tampa, FL
Dec 18, 2017*; 7:00 pm, ESPN3		Nicholls State	W 86–69	8–3	Devlin Fieldhouse (1,162); New Orleans, LA
Dec 21, 2017*; 12:00 pm, ESPN3		South Alabama	W 77–73	9–3	Devlin Fieldhouse (1,187); New Orleans, LA
AAC regular season
Dec 28, 2017; 6:00 pm, ESPN2		at Temple	W 85–75	10–3 (1–0)	Liacouras Center (5,382); Philadelphia, PA
Dec 31, 2017; 2:00 pm, ESPN3		Tulsa	L 56–65	10–4 (1–1)	Devlin Fieldhouse (1,518); New Orleans, LA
Jan 4, 2018; 8:00 pm, ESPNU		SMU	W 73–70	11–4 (2–1)	Devlin Fieldhouse (1,512); New Orleans, LA
Jan 9, 2018; 6:00 pm, ESPNews		at Memphis	L 89–96	11–5 (2–2)	FedEx Forum (4,825); Memphis, TN
Jan 13, 2018; 12:00 pm, ESPNews		UConn	L 57–67	11–6 (2–3)	Devlin Fieldhouse (1,902); New Orleans, LA
Jan 17, 2018; 7:00 pm, ESPNews		Houston	W 81–72	12–6 (3–3)	Devlin Fieldhouse (2,301); New Orleans, LA
Jan 20, 2018; 8:00 pm, ESPNews		at SMU	L 62–73	12–7 (3–4)	Moody Coliseum (6,814); Dallas, TX
Jan 25, 2018; 8:00 pm, ESPNU		South Florida	L 75–80	12–8 (3–5)	Devlin Fieldhouse (1,717); New Orleans, LA
Jan 31, 2018; 5:30 pm, ESPNews		at East Carolina	W 71–69 ^{OT}	13–8 (4–5)	Williams Arena (3,072); Greenville, NC
Feb 4, 2018; 2:00 pm, ESPNews		Temple	L 76–83	13–9 (4–6)	Devlin Fieldhouse (1,508); New Orleans, LA
Feb 8, 2018; 6:00 pm, ESPN2		at Tulsa	L 89–91 ^{OT}	13–10 (4–7)	Reynolds Center (4,019); Tulsa, OK
Feb 11, 2018; 5:00 pm, ESPNU		at Houston	L 42–73	13–11 (4–8)	H&PE Arena (2,902); Houston, TX
Feb 14, 2018; 7:00 pm, ESPNews		East Carolina	L 80–82	13–12 (4–9)	Devlin Fieldhouse (1,098); New Orleans, LA
Feb 17, 2018; 2:00 pm, ESPNU		Memphis	L 63–68	13–13 (4–10)	Devlin Fieldhouse (1,896); New Orleans, LA
Feb 21, 2018; 6:30 pm, CBSSN		at No. 13 Wichita State	L 86–93	13–14 (4–11)	Charles Koch Arena (10,506); Wichita, KS
Feb 24, 2018; 11:00 am, ESPNU		at South Florida	W 79–68	14–14 (5–11)	USF Sun Dome (2,228); Tampa, FL
Mar 1, 2018; 8:00 pm, ESPN		No. 10 Cincinnati	L 49–78	14–15 (5–12)	Devlin Fieldhouse (2,824); New Orleans, LA
Mar 4, 2018; 3:30 pm, ESPNU		at UCF	L 51–60	14–16 (5–13)	CFE Arena (4,420); Orlando, FL
AAC tournament
Mar 8, 2018; 6:00 p:m, ESPNU	(10)	vs. (7) Temple; First Round	L 77–82	14–17	Amway Center; Orlando, FL
*Non-conference game. ^{#}Rankings from AP Poll. (#) Tournament seedings in parentheses. All times are in Central Time.
