= 2017–18 Temple Owls men's basketball team =

American college basketball season

2017–18 Temple Owls men's basketball

Charleston Classic champions

NIT, First Round
- Conference: American Athletic Conference
- Record: 17–16 (8–10 AAC)
- Head coach: Fran Dunphy (12th season)
- Assistant coaches: Chris Clark; Aaron McKie; Shawn Trice
- Home arena: Liacouras Center

2017–18 American Athletic Conference men's basketball standings
	Conf.				Overall
Team	W		L	PCT	W		L	PCT
No. 6 Cincinnati †	16	–	2	.889	31	–	5	.861
No. 16 Wichita State	14	–	4	.778	25	–	8	.758
No. 21 Houston	14	–	4	.778	27	–	8	.771
Tulsa	12	–	6	.667	19	–	12	.613
Memphis	10	–	8	.556	21	–	13	.618
UCF	9	–	9	.500	19	–	13	.594
Temple	8	–	10	.444	17	–	16	.515
UConn	7	–	11	.389	14	–	18	.438
SMU	6	–	12	.333	17	–	16	.515
Tulane	5	–	13	.278	14	–	17	.452
East Carolina	4	–	14	.222	10	–	20	.333
South Florida	3	–	15	.167	10	–	22	.313
† 2018 AAC tournament winner Rankings from AP poll

The 2017–18 Temple Owls basketball team represented Temple University during the 2017–18 NCAA Division I men's basketball season. The Owls, led by 12th-year head coach Fran Dunphy, played their home games at the Liacouras Center in Philadelphia, Pennsylvania as members the American Athletic Conference. They finished the season 17–16, 8–10 in AAC play to finish in seventh place. In the AAC tournament, they defeated Tulane before losing to Wichita State in the quarterfinals. They received a bid to the National Invitation Tournament, where they lost to Penn State in the first round.

== Previous season ==
The Owls finished the 2016–17 season 16–16, 7–11 in AAC play to finish in eighth place. They lost in the first round of the AAC tournament to East Carolina.

== Offseason ==
=== Departures ===
Name	Number	Pos.	Height	Weight	Year	Hometown	Reason for departure
Daniel Dingle	4	G/F	6'7"	235	RS senior	Bronx, NY	Graduated
Mark Williams	10	F	6'8"	240	Senior	Cleveland, OH	Graduated
Isaiah Lewis	15	G	6'6"	185	Junior	Brooklyn, NY	Graduate transferred to California (PA)
Mike Robbins	22	G	6'4"	185	Senior	Wynnewood, PA	Walk-on; graduated

=== 2017 recruiting class ===
College recruiting
Name	Hometown	School	Height	Weight	Commit date
Justyn Hamilton #29 PF	Charlotte, NC	Independence High School	6 ft 10 in (2.08 m)	190 lb (86 kg)	Oct 3, 2016
Justyn Hamilton #29 PF	Recruit ratings: Scout: Rivals: 247Sports: (81)				
J.P. Moorman #36 SF	Greensboro, NC	Greensboro Day School	6 ft 7 in (2.01 m)	205 lb (93 kg)	Sep 28, 2016
J.P. Moorman #36 SF	Recruit ratings: Scout: Rivals: 247Sports: (80)				
Nate Pierre-Louis #40 SG	Jersey City, NJ	Roselle Catholic High School	6 ft 4 in (1.93 m)	185 lb (84 kg)	Sep 11, 2016
Nate Pierre-Louis #40 SG	Recruit ratings: Scout: Rivals: 247Sports: (80)				
De'Vondre Perry #45 SF	Baltimore, MD	Polytechnic Institute High School	6 ft 6 in (1.98 m)	220 lb (100 kg)	Sep 30, 2016
De'Vondre Perry #45 SF	Recruit ratings: Scout: Rivals: 247Sports: (79)				
Overall recruit ranking:
Note: In many cases, Scout, Rivals, 247Sports, On3, and ESPN may conflict in their listings of height and weight.; In these cases, the average was taken. ESPN grades are on a 100-point scale.; Sources: "2017 Team Ranking". Rivals.

=== 2018 recruiting class ===
College recruiting (2018)
Name	Hometown	School	Height	Weight	Commit date
Arashma Parks #65 C	Malvern, PA	The Phelps School	6 ft 8 in (2.03 m)	232 lb (105 kg)	Aug 3, 2017
Arashma Parks #65 C	Recruit ratings: Scout: Rivals: 247Sports: (66)				
Overall recruit ranking:
Note: In many cases, Scout, Rivals, 247Sports, On3, and ESPN may conflict in their listings of height and weight.; In these cases, the average was taken. ESPN grades are on a 100-point scale.; Sources: "2018 Team Ranking". Rivals.

== Roster ==
2017–18 Temple Owls men's basketball team
Players
Coaches

Pos.	#	Name	Height	Weight	Year	Previous school	Hometown
F	0	Obi Enechionyia	6 ft 10 in (2.08 m)	220 lb (100 kg)	Sr	St. James School	Springfield, Virginia
G	1	Josh Brown	6 ft 3 in (1.91 m)	195 lb (88 kg)	RS Sr	St. Anthony (NJ)	Irvington, New Jersey
G	2	Alani Moore II	5 ft 10 in (1.78 m)	170 lb (77 kg)	So	Friendship Collegiate Academy	Washington, D.C.
G	3	Shizz Alston	6 ft 4 in (1.93 m)	180 lb (82 kg)	Jr	Haverford School	Philadelphia, Pennsylvania
F	4	J. P. Moorman	6 ft 7 in (2.01 m)	205 lb (93 kg)	Fr	Greensboro Day School	Greensboro, North Carolina
G	11	Trey Lowe	6 ft 7 in (2.01 m)	165 lb (75 kg)	RS So	Ewing	Ewing, New Jersey
G	13	Quinton Rose	6 ft 8 in (2.03 m)	185 lb (84 kg)	So	Bishop Kearney	Rochester, New York
G	15	Nate Pierre-Louis	6 ft 4 in (1.93 m)	200 lb (91 kg)	Fr	Roselle Catholic High School	Plainfield, New Jersey
F	21	Justyn Hamilton	6 ft 10 in (2.08 m)	190 lb (86 kg)	Fr	Independence High School	Charlotte, North Carolina
F	22	De'Vondre Perry	6 ft 6 in (1.98 m)	220 lb (100 kg)	Fr	Baltimore Polytechnic	Baltimore, Maryland
C	23	Damien Moore	6 ft 11 in (2.11 m)	225 lb (102 kg)	So	Callaway	Vaughn, Mississippi
C	24	Ernest Aflakpui	6 ft 10 in (2.08 m)	240 lb (109 kg)	Jr	Archbishop Carroll	Accra, Ghana
G/F	25	Steve Leonard (W)	6 ft 6 in (1.98 m)	180 lb (82 kg)	RS Sr	Perkiomen Valley High School	Collegeville, Pennsylvania
G	32	Ayan Nunez de Carvalho	6 ft 5 in (1.96 m)	200 lb (91 kg)	RS So	Escuela Normal Superior	Paraná, Argentina

Head coach

- Fran Dunphy (La Salle)

Assistant coach(es)

- Chris Clark (Temple)
- Aaron McKie (Temple)
- Shawn Trice (Penn)

Legend

- (C) Team captain
- (S) Suspended
- (I) Ineligible
- (W) Walk-on
- Injured
- Current redshirt

Roster

== Schedule and results ==
Date time, TV	Rank^{#}	Opponent^{#}	Result	Record	Site (attendance) city, state
Exhibition
November 9, 2017*; 7:30 pm		Philadelphia	W 70–60		Liacouras Center (3,292); Philadelphia, PA
Regular season
November 16, 2017*; 1:30 pm, ESPN3		vs. Old Dominion; Charleston Classic quarterfinals	W 76–65	1–0	TD Arena (2,136); Charleston, SC
November 17, 2017*; 11:00 am, ESPN2		vs. Auburn; Charleston Classic semifinals	W 88–74	2–0	TD Arena (1,970); Charleston, SC
November 19, 2017*; 9:30 pm, ESPN2		vs. Clemson; Charleston Classic championship	W 67–60	3–0	TD Arena (2,263); Charleston, SC
November 26, 2017*; 5:00 pm, NBCSN		at La Salle; Big 5	L 83–87	3–1	Tom Gola Arena (2,855); Philadelphia, PA
November 30, 2017*; 9:00 pm, ESPNU		vs. South Carolina; Under Armour Reunion	W 76–60	4–1	Madison Square Garden (6,081); New York, NY
December 3, 2017*; 2:30 pm, NBCSP		vs. George Washington; BB&T Classic	L 67–71	4–2	Capital One Arena (4,338); Washington, DC
December 6, 2017*; 9:00 pm, ESPNU		Wisconsin	W 59–55	5–2	Liacouras Center (6,713); Philadelphia, PA
December 9, 2017*; 2:30 pm, CBSSN		Saint Joseph's; Big 5/Rivalry	W 81–78	6–2	Liacouras Center (7,288); Philadelphia, PA
December 13, 2017*; 7:00 pm, ESPN2		No. 1 Villanova; Big 5	L 67–87	6–3	Liacouras Center (10,206); Philadelphia, PA
December 16, 2017*; 5:00 pm, ESPN3		Drexel; City 6	W 63–60	7–3	Liacouras Center (5,324); Philadelphia, PA
December 22, 2017*; 1:00 pm, SECN		at Georgia	L 66–84	7–4	Stegeman Coliseum (8,282); Athens, GA
December 28, 2017; 7:00 pm, ESPN2		Tulane	L 75–85	7–5 (0–1)	Liacouras Center (5,382); Philadelphia, PA
December 30, 2017; 6:00 pm, ESPNU		at Houston	L 73–76	7–6 (0–2)	H&PE Arena (3,370); Houston, TX
January 4, 2018; 9:00 pm, ESPN2		No. 19 Cincinnati	L 53–55	7–7 (0–3)	Liacouras Center (4,274); Philadelphia, PA
January 7, 2018; 12:00 pm, CBSSN		at UCF	L 39–60	7–8 (0–4)	CFE Arena (4,010); Orlando, FL
January 10, 2018; 9:00 pm, CBSSN		at SMU	W 66–64	8–8 (1–4)	Moody Coliseum (6,471); University Park, TX
January 13, 2018; 2:00 pm, CBSSN		Memphis	L 72–75 ^{OT}	8–9 (1–5)	Liacouras Center (6,238); Philadelphia, PA
January 17, 2018; 6:00 pm, ESPNews		Tulsa	W 59–58	9–9 (2–5)	Liacouras Center (4,694); Philadelphia, PA
January 20, 2018*; 6:00 pm, NBCSP		at Penn; Big 5	W 60–51	10–9	Palestra (7,233); Philadelphia, PA
January 24, 2018; 9:00 pm, CBSSN		at No. 9 Cincinnati	L 42–75	10–10 (2–6)	BB&T Arena (8,924); Highland Heights, KY
January 28, 2018; 8:00 pm, ESPN2		UConn	W 85–57	11–10 (3–6)	Liacouras Center (6,103); Philadelphia, PA
February 1, 2018; 7:00 pm, ESPN2		No. 16 Wichita State	W 81–79 ^{OT}	12–10 (4–6)	Liacouras Center (6,320); Philadelphia, PA
February 4, 2018; 3:00 pm, ESPNews		at Tulane	W 83–76	13–10 (5–6)	Devlin Fieldhouse (1,508); New Orleans, LA
February 7, 2018; 7:00 pm, ESPNews		East Carolina	W 90–73	14–10 (6–6)	Liacouras Center (5,282); Philadelphia, PA
February 10, 2018; 12:00 pm, ESPNU		at South Florida	W 73–55	15–10 (7–6)	USF Sun Dome (2,576); Tampa, FL
February 15, 2018; 7:00 pm, ESPN2		at No. 19 Wichita State	L 86–93	15–11 (7–7)	Charles Koch Arena (10,506); Wichita, KS
February 18, 2018; 4:00 pm, CBSSN		Houston	L 59–80	15–12 (7–8)	Liacouras Center (7,270); Philadelphia, PA
February 25, 2018; 2:00 pm, ESPNU		UCF	W 75–56	16–12 (8–8)	Liacouras Center (7,119); Philadelphia, PA
February 28, 2018; 7:00 pm, CBSSN		at UConn	L 66–72	16–13 (8–9)	Harry A. Gampel Pavilion (7,674); Storrs, CT
March 4, 2018; 3:00 pm, ESPN3		at Tulsa	L 58–76	16–14 (8–10)	Reynolds Center (5,303); Tulsa, OK
AAC tournament
March 8, 2018; 7:00 pm, ESPNU	(7)	vs. (10) Tulane; First round	W 82–77	17–14	Amway Center (7,918); Orlando, FL
March 9, 2018; 7:00 pm, ESPNU	(7)	vs. (2) No. 11 Wichita State; Quarterfinals	L 81–89	17–15	Amway Center (8,680); Orlando, FL
NIT
March 14, 2018*; 8:00 pm, ESPNU	(5)	at (4) Penn State; First round – Notre Dame Bracket	L 57–63	17–16	Bryce Jordan Center (4,528); State College, PA
*Non-conference game. ^{#}Rankings from AP Poll. (#) Tournament seedings in parentheses. All times are in Eastern Time.
