= Junior Etou =

Congolese basketball player

Fos Provence Basket
- Position: Power forward
- League: Élite 2

Personal information
- Born: June 4, 1994 (age 32) Pointe-Noire, Republic of the Congo
- Listed height: 2.01 m (6 ft 7 in)
- Listed weight: 108 kg (238 lb)

Career information
- High school: Bishop O'Connell (Arlington, Virginia)
- College: Rutgers (2013–2015); Tulsa (2016–2018)
- NBA draft: 2018: undrafted
- Playing career: 2018–present

Career history
- 2018–2019: Sakarya BB
- 2019: Estudiantes
- 2019: Cholet
- 2019–2020: s.Oliver Würzburg
- 2020–2021: Quimper Rams
- 2021–2022: Hapoel Be'er Sheva
- 2022–2023: New Basket Brindisi
- 2023: Hapoel Haifa
- 2023–2024: SIG Strasbourg
- 2024–2025: Fos Provence Basket
- 2025: Czarni Słupsk
- 2026–present: Fos Provence Basket

Career highlights
- Second-team All-AAC (2018)

Luc Tselan Tsiene Etou (born June 4, 1994), also known as "Junior" Etou, is a Congolese professional basketball player for Fos Provence Basket of the French Élite 2.

== Personal life ==
Etou was born in Pointe-Noire, Republic of Congo.

== High school ==
From 2012 to 2013, Etou played for Bishop Denis J. O'Connell High School in Arlington, Virginia.

A cousin of Oklahoma City Thunder forward Serge Ibaka, Etou ranked as Rivals.com's No. 142 national recruit in the Class of 2013, and No. 31 on ESPN's Top Recruits for Power Forwards in 2013. He held offers from Clemson, Kansas, Maryland, Miami (Fla.), Rutgers, Washington, West Virginia, and Xavier.

== College career ==
He was signed by Rutgers University on May 1, 2013, and played for them for two years. Etou began his collegiate career at Rutgers. As a sophomore, he averaged 7.4 points and 6.6 rebounds per game.

Following his sophomore season, he transferred to Tulsa. He was named TU Athlete of the Week. Etou averaged 15 points and 7.9 rebounds per game as a senior, leading the team in both categories. He earned Second Team All-American Athletic Conference honors.

=== College statistics ===
Year	Team	GP	GS	MPG	FG%	3P%	FT%	RPG	APG	SPG	BPG	PPG
2013–14	Rutgers	27	20	23.0	.419	.256	.639	4.6	0.7	0.2	0.4	5.3
2014–15	Rutgers	31	31	29.6	.391	.311	.662	6.6	0.6	0.4	0.4	7.4
2016–17	Tulsa	32	32	29.2	.490	.427	.767	6.7	1.3	0.5	0.1	12.6
2017–18	Tulsa	31	31	30.4	.466	.350	.715	7.9	1.5	0.5	0.3	15.0

== Professional career ==
Etou signed with the Turkish club Sakarya Büyükşehir Belediyesi S.K. on July 27, 2018.

On April 5, 2019, he signed with Movistar Estudiantes of the Spanish ACB.

On July 24, 2019, he signed with Cholet Basket of the French LNB Pro A.

On November 10, 2019, he signed with s.Oliver Würzburg of the German Basketball Bundesliga (BBL).

On August 16, 2020, Etou signed with UJAP Quimper 29 of the LNB Pro B.

On August 2, 2021, he signed with Hapoel Be'er Sheva of the Israeli Premier League.

On July 28, 2022, he signed with New Basket Brindisi of the Lega Basket Serie A.

He plays for Hapoel Haifa of the Israeli Basketball Premier League in the 2023–24 season.

On July 4, 2025, he signed with Czarni Słupsk of the Polish Basketball League (PLK).

== International career ==
Etou competed with the Republic of the Congo men's national basketball team at the 2009 African Championship, where he averaged 1.7 blocks per game, ranking second in the competition despite being the second youngest player at the tournament.
