= Jeff Lebo =

American basketball player and coach (born 1966)

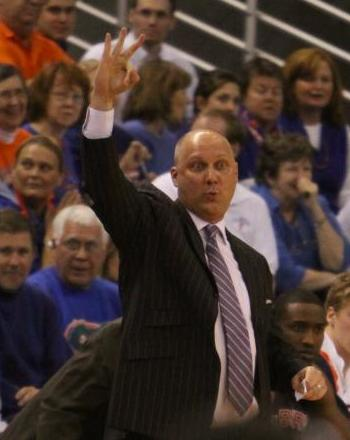
- Lebo in 2010

Personal information
- Born: October 5, 1966 (age 60) Carlisle, Pennsylvania, U.S.
- Listed height: 6 ft 2 in (1.88 m)
- Listed weight: 180 lb (82 kg)

Career information
- High school: Carlisle (Carlisle, Pennsylvania)
- College: North Carolina (1985–1989)
- NBA draft: 1989: undrafted
- Position: Shooting guard
- Number: 14
- Coaching career: 1990–present

Career history

Playing
- 1989: San Antonio Spurs

Coaching
- 1990–1992: East Tennessee State (assistant)
- 1992–1993: Vanderbilt (assistant)
- 1993–1998: South Carolina (assistant)
- 1998–2002: Tennessee Tech
- 2002–2004: Chattanooga
- 2004–2010: Auburn
- 2010–2017: East Carolina
- 2019–2020: Greensboro Swarm (assistant)
- 2021–2026: North Carolina (assistant)

Career highlights
- As player: Second-team All-ACC (1988); McDonald's All-American (1985); First-team Parade All-American (1985); Second-team Parade All-American (1984); As coach: CIT champion (2013); 2× OVC regular season champion (2001, 2002); 3× OVC Coach of the Year (2000–2002)
- Stats at NBA.com
- Stats at Basketball Reference
Medals
Men's basketball
Representing United States
Pan American Games
Silver medal – second place	1987 Indianapolis	Team competition

Jeffrey Brian Lebo (born October 5, 1966) is an American basketball coach and former player who is an assistant coach for his alma mater, North Carolina. He was previously the head men's basketball coach at East Carolina (2010–2017), Auburn University (2004–2010), the University of Tennessee at Chattanooga (2002–2004), and Tennessee Tech (1998–2002).

Before becoming a head coach, he spent a total of eight years as an assistant coach at South Carolina, Vanderbilt, and East Tennessee State. He also spent a season as an assistant with the Greensboro Swarm of the NBA G League.

== Formative years ==
Lebo was born in Carlisle, Pennsylvania. As a high school player, he played for his father, Dave Lebo, at Carlisle High School, where he was a McDonald's All-American. The elder Lebo would later serve as an assistant to his son, at Auburn.

As a collegian, Lebo was a four-year starter (1986–1989) while playing for legendary coach Dean Smith at the University of North Carolina. While at Carolina, Lebo set the Tar Heel record for most consecutive free throws made (41 from January 3 to March 12, 1989), the most assists in a single game (17 vs. Chattanooga on November 18, 1988) and (at the time) had the highest career free throw shooting percentage (.839) in Tar Heel history (currently fifth all time) and was third in Tar Heel history with 580 assists (currently tenth all time).

Lebo was also an Academic All American and graduated in 1989 with a degree in Business Administration.

After leaving the Tar Heels, Lebo had a brief NBA career as a member of the San Antonio Spurs during the 1989–90 season, appearing in four games.

== Coaching career ==
On March 12, 2010, following a loss to Florida in the 2010 SEC men's basketball tournament in Nashville, Lebo was fired as the head basketball coach at Auburn after compiling a 96–93 record in six years as coach of the Tigers to go along with no post-season NCAA tournament bids.

On March 22, 2010, Lebo was named head coach at East Carolina University. During his first year in Greenville, Lebo led the ECU Pirates basketball team to 18 wins, their first winning season since 1997, and a spot in the 2011 CollegeInsider.com Tournament which was the first post-season appearance by the Pirates since the 1993 NCAA Tournament. The 18 wins were the second most wins ever by the ECU Pirates since becoming a Division I basketball team. During his third year at ECU, Lebo again led the Pirates to the CIT Tournament. The Pirates defeated Weber State and won the 2013 CollegeInsider.com Postseason Tournament Championship that year. On November 29, 2017, Lebo announced his resignation as the ECU Basketball Coach. He posted a 116–122 mark during his tenure at ECU.

On April 15, 2021, after former teammate Hubert Davis' hiring as the North Carolina head coach, Lebo was named as one of the three assistants for Davis' inaugural coaching staff, alongside former Tar Heel players Brad Frederick and Sean May.

== Career playing statistics ==
Legend
GP	Games played	GS	Games started	MPG	Minutes per game
FG%	Field goal percentage	3P%	3-point field goal percentage	FT%	Free throw percentage
RPG	Rebounds per game	APG	Assists per game	SPG	Steals per game
BPG	Blocks per game	PPG	Points per game	**Bold**	Career high

=== NBA ===
==== Regular season ====
Year	Team	GP	GS	MPG	FG%	3P%	FT%	RPG	APG	SPG	BPG	PPG
1989–90	San Antonio	4	0	8.0	.286	–	1.000	1.0	.8	.5	.0	1.5

== Head coaching record ==
Record table
Season	Team	Overall	Conference	Standing	Postseason
**Tennessee Tech** (Ohio Valley Conference) (1998–2002)
1998–99	Tennessee Tech	12–15	8–10	T–7th	
1999–00	Tennessee Tech	16–12	11–7	T–3rd	
2000–01	Tennessee Tech	20–9	13–3	1st	
2001–02	Tennessee Tech	27–7	15–1	1st	NIT Quarterfinals
Tennessee Tech:		75–43 (.636)	47–21 (.691)		
**Chattanooga** (Southern Conference) (2002–2004)
2002–03	Chattanooga	21–9	11–5	2nd (South)	
2003–04	Chattanooga	19–11	10–6	2nd (North)	
Chattanooga:		40–20 (.667)	21–11 (.656)		
**Auburn** (Southeastern Conference) (2004–2010)
2004–05	Auburn	14–17	4–12	T–5th (West)	
2005–06	Auburn	12–16	4–12	T–5th (West)	
2006–07	Auburn	17–15	7–9	T–3rd (West)	
2007–08	Auburn	14–16	4–12	6th (West)	
2008–09	Auburn	24–12	10–6	2nd (West)	NIT Quarterfinals
2009–10	Auburn	15–17	6–10	T–4th (West)	
Auburn:		96–93 (.508)	35–61 (.365)		
**East Carolina** (Conference USA) (2010–2014)
2010–11	East Carolina	18–16	8–8	T–7th	CIT First Round
2011–12	East Carolina	15–16	5–11	10th	
2012–13	East Carolina	23–12	9–7	T–4th	CIT Champions
2013–14	East Carolina	17–17	5–11	T–12th	CIT First Round
**East Carolina** (American Athletic Conference) (2014–2017)
2014–15	East Carolina	14–19	6–12	T–7th	
2015–16	East Carolina	12–20	4–14	T–9th	
2016–17	East Carolina	15–18*	6–12*	9th	
2017–18	East Carolina	2–4**			
East Carolina:		116–122 (.487)	43–75 (.364)		
Total:		327–277 (.541)			
National champion Postseason invitational champion Conference regular season champion Conference regular season and conference tournament champion Division regular season champion Division regular season and conference tournament champion Conference tournament champion

*Lebo underwent hip surgery on January 16, 2017, and missed the rest of the 2016–17 season. Assistant coach Michael Perry took over as head coach in Lebo's absence. At the time of Lebo's absence, ECU was 9–10 overall and 1–5 in AAC play.
**Lebo resigned on November 29, 2017.
