= 2018–19 Cincinnati Bearcats men's basketball team =

American college basketball season

2018–19 Cincinnati Bearcats men's basketball

AAC tournament champions Emerald Coast Classic champions

NCAA tournament, First Round
- Conference: American Athletic Conference

Ranking
- AP: No. 22
- Record: 28–7 (14–4 AAC)
- Head coach: Mick Cronin (13th season)
- Assistant coaches: Darren Savino (9th season); Antwon Jackson (6th season); Greg Youncofski (1st season)
- Home arena: Fifth Third Arena

2018–19 American Athletic Conference men's basketball standings
| | Conf. | | | | Overall |
| Team | W | | L | PCT | W | | L | PCT |
|---|---|---|---|---|---|---|---|---|
| No. 11 Houston | 16 | – | 2 | .889 | 33 | – | 4 | .892 |
| No. 22 Cincinnati † | 14 | – | 4 | .778 | 28 | – | 7 | .800 |
| Temple | 13 | – | 5 | .722 | 23 | – | 10 | .697 |
| UCF | 13 | – | 5 | .722 | 24 | – | 9 | .727 |
| Memphis | 11 | – | 7 | .611 | 22 | – | 14 | .611 |
| Wichita State | 10 | – | 8 | .556 | 22 | – | 15 | .595 |
| Tulsa | 8 | – | 10 | .444 | 18 | – | 14 | .563 |
| South Florida | 8 | – | 10 | .444 | 24 | – | 14 | .632 |
| UConn | 6 | – | 12 | .333 | 16 | – | 17 | .485 |
| SMU | 6 | – | 12 | .333 | 15 | – | 17 | .469 |
| East Carolina | 3 | – | 15 | .167 | 10 | – | 21 | .323 |
| Tulane | 0 | – | 18 | .000 | 4 | – | 27 | .129 |
† 2019 AAC tournament winner Rankings from AP poll

The 2018–19 Cincinnati Bearcats men's basketball team represented the University of Cincinnati in the 2018–19 NCAA Division I men's basketball season. The Bearcats were led by 13th-year head coach Mick Cronin, and played its home games at the newly renovated Fifth Third Arena as members of the American Athletic Conference. They finished the season 28–7, 14–4 in AAC play, finishing in second place. They defeated SMU, Wichita State, and No. 1 seed Houston to win the AAC tournament for the second consecutive year, and received the conference's automatic bid to the NCAA tournament. As the No. 7 seed in the South region, they were upset by No. 10 seed Iowa in the first round.

== Previous season ==
The Bearcats finished the 2016–17 season 31–5, 16–2 in AAC play to win the regular season championship. They defeated SMU, Memphis, and Houston to win the AAC tournament and received the conference's automatic bid to the NCAA tournament. As the No. 2 seed in the North region, they defeated Georgia State in the first round before being upset by Nevada in the second round.

== Offseason ==
=== Departing players ===
| Name | Number | Pos. | Height | Weight | Year | Hometown | Notes |
|---|---|---|---|---|---|---|---|
| Jacob Evans | 1 | G/F | 6'6" | 210 | Junior | Baton Rouge, Louisiana | Declared for NBA draft; selected 28th overall by the Golden State Warriors |
| Gary Clark | 11 | F | 6'8" | 225 | Senior | Clayton, North Carolina | Graduated |
| Jackson Bart | 14 | F | 6'5" | 210 | RS Sophomore | Bartlesville, Oklahoma | Walk-on; graduated |
| Kyle Washington | 24 | F | 6'9" | 230 | RS Senior | Champlin, Minnesota | Graduated |

On September 13, 2018 Associate Head Coach Larry Davis resigned before the start of the season. In October, Greg Youncofski was named as the third assistant coach for the 2018-19 season.

=== Recruiting class of 2018 ===
College recruiting information
| Name | Hometown | School | Height | Weight | Commit date |
|---|---|---|---|---|---|
| Logan Johnson; PG | Mountain View, California | Saint Francis High School | 6 ft 2 in (1.88 m) | 165 lb (75 kg) | Sep 14, 2017 |
| Logan Johnson; PG | Recruit ratings: Scout: Rivals: 247Sports: (68) | | | | |
| Laquill Hardnett; SF | Nottingham, Maryland | Perry Hall High School | 6 ft 8 in (2.03 m) | 195 lb (88 kg) | Feb 26, 2018 |
| Laquill Hardnett; SF | Recruit ratings: Scout: Rivals: 247Sports: (NR) | | | | |
| Rashawn Fredricks; SF | St. Croix, Virgin Islands | Motlow State Community College | 6 ft 5 in (1.96 m) | 180 lb (82 kg) | Apr 21, 2018 |
| Rashawn Fredricks; SF | Recruit ratings: Scout: Rivals: 247Sports: (NR) | | | | |
| Prince Gillam Toyambi; PF | Kinshasa, DR Congo | Fresno High School | 6 ft 7 in (2.01 m) | 225 lb (102 kg) | Aug 31, 2018 |
| Prince Gillam Toyambi; PF | Recruit ratings: Scout: Rivals: 247Sports: (NR) | | | | |
Overall recruit ranking:
Note: In many cases, Scout, Rivals, 247Sports, On3, and ESPN may conflict in their listings of height and weight.; In these cases, the average was taken. ESPN grades are on a 100-point scale.; Sources: "Cincinnati 2018 Player Commits". ESPN.; "2018 Team Ranking". Rivals.

== Preseason ==
=== AAC media poll ===
The AAC media poll was released on October 15, 2018, with the Bearcats predicted to finish second in the AAC.

Media poll
| Predicted finish | Team | Votes (1st place) |
| 1 | UCF | 114 (6) |
| 2 | Cincinnati | 107 (3) |
| 3 | Houston | 103 (2) |
| 4 | Memphis | 85 (1) |
| 5 | UConn | 75 |
| 6 | Temple | 74 |
| 7 | SMU | 63 |
| 8 | Wichita State | 60 |
| 9 | Tulsa | 48 |
| 10 | Tulane | 23 |
| 11 | East Carolina | 22 |
| 12 | USF | 18 |

=== Preseason Awards ===
American Athletic Conference

- All-AAC First Team - Jarron Cumberland

Lindy's Sports

- All-Conference First Team - Jarron Cumberland

Athlon Sports

- All-AAC First Team - Jarron Cumberland

Street & Smith's

- All-Conference - Jarron Cumberland
- All-Newcomer - Rashawn Fredricks

== Roster ==
2018–19 Cincinnati Bearcats men's basketball team
Players
Coaches

| Pos. | # | Name | Height | Weight | Year | Previous school | Hometown |
|---|---|---|---|---|---|---|---|
| G | 0 | Logan Johnson | 6 ft 2 in (1.88 m) | 175 lb (79 kg) | Fr | Saint Francis High School | Mountain View, California |
| G | 2 | Keith Williams | 6 ft 5 in (1.96 m) | 210 lb (95 kg) | So | Bishop Loughlin Memorial High School | Brooklyn, New York |
| G | 3 | Justin Jenifer (C) | 5 ft 10 in (1.78 m) | 175 lb (79 kg) | Sr | Milford Mill Academy | Baltimore, Maryland |
| G | 5 | Trevor Moore | 6 ft 5 in (1.96 m) | 195 lb (88 kg) | So | South Kent Prep | Houston, Texas |
| G/F | 10 | Rashawn Fredricks | 6 ft 5 in (1.96 m) | 200 lb (91 kg) | Jr | Motlow State CC | St. Croix, Virgin Islands |
| F | 11 | LaQuill Hardnett (redshirt) | 6 ft 8 in (2.03 m) | 210 lb (95 kg) | Fr | Perry Hall High School | Philadelphia, Pennsylvania |
| F | 13 | Trevon Scott | 6 ft 8 in (2.03 m) | 220 lb (100 kg) | RS Jr | McIntosh County Academy | Darien, Georgia |
| G | 15 | Cane Broome (C) | 6 ft 0 in (1.83 m) | 165 lb (75 kg) | Sr | Sacred Heart | East Hartford, Connecticut |
| F | 20 | Mamoudou Diarra | 6 ft 9 in (2.06 m) | 215 lb (98 kg) | RS Fr | 22ft Academy | Bamako, Mali |
| F/C | 22 | Eliel Nsoseme | 6 ft 9 in (2.06 m) | 225 lb (102 kg) | So | The RISE Centre Academy | Kinshasa, DR Congo |
| F | 24 | Prince Gillam Toyambi (redshirt) | 6 ft 7 in (2.01 m) | 225 lb (102 kg) | Fr | Fresno High School | Kinshasa, DR Congo |
| G | 31 | Sam Martin (W) | 5 ft 10 in (1.78 m) | 170 lb (77 kg) | So | Summit Country Day School | Cincinnati, Ohio |
| G | 32 | John Koz (W) | 6 ft 1 in (1.85 m) | 200 lb (91 kg) | Jr | Bay High School | Cleveland, Ohio |
| C | 33 | Nysier Brooks | 6 ft 11 in (2.11 m) | 240 lb (109 kg) | Jr | Advanced Prep International | Philadelphia, Pennsylvania |
| G | 34 | Jarron Cumberland | 6 ft 5 in (1.96 m) | 205 lb (93 kg) | Jr | Wilmington High School | Wilmington, Ohio |

Head coach

- Mick Cronin (Cincinnati)

Assistant coach(es)

- Darren Savino (NJCU)
- Antwon Jackson (Pikeville)
- Greg Youncofski (Kansas)

Legend

- (C) Team captain
- (S) Suspended
- (I) Ineligible
- (W) Walk-on
- Injured
- Current redshirt

Roster
Last update: September 29, 2018

=== Depth chart ===
| Pos. | Starting 5 | Bench 1 | Bench 2 |
|---|---|---|---|
| C | Nysier Brooks | Eliel Nsoseme |
| PF | Trevon Scott | Mamoudou Diarra |
| SF | Jarron Cumberland | Rashawn Fredricks | John Koz |
| SG | Keith Williams | Trevor Moore | Sam Martin |
| PG | Justin Jenifer | Cane Broome | Logan Johnson |

== Schedule and results ==
The Bearcats had a pre-season tour in Canada, playing three teams on the trip. The Bearcats will reopen Fifth Third Arena against Ohio State on November 7, 2018.

| Date time, TV | Rank^{#} | Opponent^{#} | Result | Record | High points | High rebounds | High assists | Site (attendance) city, state |
Exhibition
| August 5, 2018*; 2:00pm | | at Ottawa | W 85–57 | | 18 – Williams | 7 – Tied | 4 – Jenifer | Jean de Brébeuf College; Montréal, Québec |
| August 6, 2018*; 7:00pm | | at Carleton | L 67–86 | | 12 – Cumberland | 8 – Nsoseme | 2 – Tied | Ravens Nest Arena; Ottawa, Ontario |
| August 7, 2018*; 5:30pm | | at McGill | W 79–53 | | 17 – Cumberland | 5 – Tied | 5 – Cumberland | Love Competition Hall (161); Montréal, Québec |
| November 1, 2018*; 7:00pm | | Tusculum | W 68–41 | | 15 – Broome | 10 – Scott | 3 – Jenifer | Fifth Third Arena (10,101); Cincinnati, OH |
Non-conference regular season
| November 7, 2018*; 6:00pm, ESPN2 | | Ohio State | L 56–64 | 0–1 | 22 – Cumberland | 6 – Tied | 5 – Jenifer | Fifth Third Arena (12,012); Cincinnati, OH |
| November 13, 2018*; 7:00pm, FSOH/ESPN3 | | North Carolina Central; Emerald Coast Classic First Round | W 73–51 | 1–1 | 15 – Williams | 7 – Brooks | 6 – Jenifer | Fifth Third Arena (10,037); Cincinnati, OH |
| November 16, 2018*; 7:00pm, ESPN3 | | Milwaukee | W 74–63 | 2–1 | 17 – Broome | 10 – Tied | 6 – Johnson | Fifth Third Arena (10,163); Cincinnati, OH |
| November 19, 2018*; 7:00pm, ESPN3 | | Western Michigan; Emerald Coast Classic Second Round | W 78–52 | 3–1 | 27 – Cumberland | 10 – Brooks | 6 – Cumberland | Fifth Third Arena (8,998); Cincinnati, OH |
| November 23, 2018*; 7:00pm, CBSSN | | vs. George Mason; Emerald Coast Classic Semifinal | W 71–55 | 4–1 | 21 – Broome | 8 – Scott | 3 – Jenifer | The Arena at NWFSC (1,250); Niceville, FL |
| November 24, 2018*; 7:00pm, CBSSN | | vs. Ole Miss; Emerald Coast Classic Championship | W 71–57 | 5–1 | 25 – Cumberland | 9 – Scott | 4 – Broome | The Arena at NWFSC (1,250); Niceville, FL |
| November 27, 2018*; 7:00pm, FSOH | | Arkansas–Pine Bluff | W 105–49 | 6–1 | 13 – Jenifer | 7 – Scott | 6 – Cumberland | Fifth Third Arena (8,513); Cincinnati, OH |
| December 1, 2018*; 6:00pm, CBSSN | | at UNLV | W 65–61 | 7–1 | 15 – Williams | 8 – Williams | 6 – Jenifer | Thomas & Mack Center (9,572); Las Vegas, NV |
| December 4, 2018*; 7:00pm, FSOH/ESPN3 | | Northern Kentucky | W 78–65 | 8–1 | 22 – Scott | 10 – Scott | 5 – Cumberland | Fifth Third Arena (11,218); Cincinnati, OH |
| December 8, 2018*; 2:00pm, ESPN2 | | Xavier; Crosstown Shootout | W 62–47 | 9–1 | 19 – Cumberland | 10 – Scott | 9 – Jenifer | Fifth Third Arena (12,513); Cincinnati, OH |
| December 15, 2018*; 8:30pm, SECN | | at No. 18 Mississippi State | L 59–70 | 9–2 | 21 – Cumberland | 8 – Brooks | 4 – Jenifer | Humphrey Coliseum (9,120); Starkville, MS |
| December 19, 2018*; 9:00pm, ESPN2 | | UCLA | W 93–64 | 10–2 | 25 – Cumberland | 6 – Brooks | 5 – Jenifer | Fifth Third Arena (12,689); Cincinnati, OH |
| December 22, 2018*; 2:00pm, FSOH/ESPN3 | | South Carolina State | W 77–56 | 11–2 | 17 – Brooks | 8 – Brooks | 5 – Jenifer | Fifth Third Arena (11,623); Cincinnati, OH |
AAC Regular Season
| January 2, 2019; 6:30pm, CBSSN | | Tulane | W 93–61 | 12–2 (1–0) | 22 – Cumberland | 7 – Cumberland | 5 – Tied | Fifth Third Arena (10,689); Cincinnati, OH |
| January 5, 2019; 1:00pm, CBSSN | | at East Carolina | L 71–73 | 12–3 (1–1) | 18 – Cumberland | 9 – Scott | 4 – Cumberland | Williams Arena (4,238); Greenville, NC |
| January 10, 2019; 7:00pm, ESPN2 | | at Tulsa; Thursday Night Showcase | W 70–65 ^{OT} | 13–3 (2–1) | 16 – Broome | 9 – Scott | 6 – Broome | Reynolds Center (4,342); Tulsa, OK |
| January 12, 2019; 8:00pm, ESPN2 | | UConn; Saturday Showcase | W 74–72 ^{OT} | 14–3 (3–1) | 22 – Cumberland | 6 – Tied | 7 – Cumberland | Fifth Third Arena (11,375); Cincinnati, OH |
| January 15, 2019; 7:00pm, ESPNews | | South Florida | W 82–74 | 15–3 (4–1) | 34 – Cumberland | 6 – Brooks | 5 – Broome | Fifth Third Arena (10,347); Cincinnati, OH |
| January 19, 2019; 2:00pm, CBS | | at Wichita State | W 66–55 | 16–3 (5–1) | 18 – Cumberland | 11 – Scott | 2 – Cumberland | Charles Koch Arena (10,254); Wichita, KS |
| January 24, 2019; 7:00pm, ESPN2 | | Tulsa; Thursday Night Showcase | W 88–64 | 17–3 (6–1) | 23 – Cumberland | 11 – Scott | 5 – Tied | Fifth Third Arena (10,484); Cincinnati, OH |
| January 27, 2019; 12:00pm, CBSSN | | at Temple | W 72–68 | 18–3 (7–1) | 25 – Cumberland | 8 – Cumberland | 3 – Tied | Liacouras Center (6,652); Philadelphia, PA |
| February 2, 2019; 8:00pm, CBSSN | | SMU | W 73–68 | 19–3 (8–1) | 24 – Cumberland | 9 – Cumberland | 5 – Cumberland | Fifth Third Arena (12,256); Cincinnati, OH |
| February 7, 2019; 7:00pm, ESPN2 | No. 25 | at Memphis; Rivalry/Thursday Night Showcase | W 69–64 | 20–3 (9–1) | 17 – Cumberland | 9 – Scott | 6 – Cumberland | FedEx Forum (16,363); Memphis, TN |
| February 10, 2019; 4:00pm, ESPN | No. 25 | at No. 12 Houston | L 58–65 | 20–4 (9–2) | 27 – Cumberland | 10 – Brooks | 2 – Broome | Fertitta Center (7,039); Houston, TX |
| February 17, 2019; 1:00pm, ESPN | | Wichita State | W 72–62 | 21–4 (10–2) | 27 – Cumberland | 8 – Tied | 5 – Cumberland | Fifth Third Arena (12,223); Cincinnati, OH |
| February 21, 2019; 7:00pm, ESPN2 | | UCF; Thursday Night Showcase | W 60–55 | 22–4 (11–2) | 12 – Tied | 7 – Tied | 6 – Cumberland | Fifth Third Arena (12,377); Cincinnati, OH |
| February 24, 2019; 2:00pm, ESPN | | at UConn | W 64–60 | 23–4 (12–2) | 12 – Williams | 8 – Scott | 4 – Cumberland | XL Center (11,904); Hartford, CT |
| February 27, 2019; 9:00pm, CBSSN | No. 23 | at SMU | W 52–49 | 24–4 (13–2) | 12 – Cumberland | 12 – Brooks | 4 – Cumberland | Moody Coliseum (5,747); Dallas, TX |
| March 2, 2019; 8:00pm, ESPNU | No. 23 | Memphis; Rivalry | W 71–69 | 25–4 (14–2) | 26 – Cumberland | 12 – Brooks | 3 – Tied | Fifth Third Arena (12,392); Cincinnati, OH |
| March 7, 2019; 7:00pm, ESPN2 | No. 20 | at No. 25 UCF; Thursday Night Showcase | L 55–58 | 25–5 (14–3) | 20 – Scott | 9 – Scott | 5 – Cumberland | CFE Arena (9,141); Orlando, FL |
| March 10, 2019; 12:00pm, CBS | No. 20 | No. 12 Houston | L 69–85 | 25–6 (14–4) | 20 – Cumberland | 8 – Scott | 5 – Broome | Fifth Third Arena (12,701); Cincinnati, OH |
AAC Tournament
| March 15, 2019; 7:00pm, ESPNU | (2) No. 24 | vs. (10) SMU; Quarterfinals | W 82–74 | 26–6 | 26 – Cumberland | 12 – Scott | 8 – Cumberland | FedExForum (7,356); Memphis, TN |
| March 16, 2019; 5:00pm, ESPN2 | (2) No. 24 | vs. (6) Wichita State; Semifinals | W 66–63 | 27–6 | 13 – Brooks | 9 – Brooks | 4 – Cumberland | FedExForum (7,819); Memphis, TN |
| March 17, 2019; 3:15pm, ESPN | (2) No. 24 | vs. (1) No. 11 Houston; Championship | W 69–57 | 28–6 | 33 – Cumberland | 8 – Tied | 2 – Tied | FedExForum (7,223); Memphis, TN |
NCAA tournament
| March 22, 2019*; 12:15pm, CBS | (7 S) No. 22 | vs. (10 S) Iowa; First Round | L 72–79 | 28–7 | 19 – Jenifer | 7 – Scott | 4 – Cumberland | Nationwide Arena (19,641); Columbus, OH |
*Non-conference game. ^{#}Rankings from AP Poll. (#) Tournament seedings in parentheses. S=South. All times are in Eastern Time.

== Awards and milestones ==
=== All-American ===
- Honorable Mention: Jarron Cumberland

=== American Athletic Conference honors ===
==== All-AAC Awards ====
- Player of the Year: Jarron Cumberland

==== All-AAC First Team ====
- Jarron Cumberland

==== Player of the Week ====
- Week 3: Jarron Cumberland
- Week 7: Jarron Cumberland
- Week 10: Jarron Cumberland
- Week 11: Jarron Cumberland

==== Weekly Honor Roll ====
- Week 5: Trevon Scott
- Week 9: Jarron Cumberland
- Week 12: Jarron Cumberland
- Week 13: Jarron Cumberland
- Week 14: Jarron Cumberland
- Week 15: Cane Broome
- Week 16: Jarron Cumberland

=== AAC Tournament honors ===
==== AAC Tournament MVP ====
- Jarron Cumberland

==== All Tournament Team ====
- Jarron Cumberland
- Trevon Scott

== Rankings ==
Ranking movements Legend: ██ Increase in ranking ██ Decrease in ranking — = Not ranked RV = Received votes т = Tied with team above or below
| | Week | | | | | | | | | | | | | | | | | | | | |
| Poll | Pre | 1 | 2 | 3 | 4 | 5 | 6 | 7 | 8 | 9 | 10 | 11 | 12 | 13 | 14 | 15 | 16 | 17 | 18 | 19 | Final |
|---|---|---|---|---|---|---|---|---|---|---|---|---|---|---|---|---|---|---|---|---|---|
| AP | RV | RV | — | — | — | — | RV | RV | RV | RV | — | RV | RV | RV | 25 | RV | RV | 23 | 20 | 24 | 22 |
| Coaches | RV | RV | — | — | — | RV | RV | RV | RV | RV | — | — | RV | RV | 23 | RV | 25-T | 22 | 19 | 23 | 24 |

*AP does not release post-NCAA tournament rankings
