= 2018–19 Tulsa Golden Hurricane men's basketball team =

American college basketball season

2018–19 Tulsa Golden Hurricane men's basketball
- Conference: American Athletic Conference
- Record: 18–14 (8–10 AAC)
- Head coach: Frank Haith (5th season)
- Assistant coaches: Ken McDonald; Kenton Paulino; Shea Seals
- Home arena: Reynolds Center

2018–19 American Athletic Conference men's basketball standings
	Conf.				Overall
Team	W		L	PCT	W		L	PCT
No. 11 Houston	16	–	2	.889	33	–	4	.892
No. 22 Cincinnati †	14	–	4	.778	28	–	7	.800
Temple	13	–	5	.722	23	–	10	.697
UCF	13	–	5	.722	24	–	9	.727
Memphis	11	–	7	.611	22	–	14	.611
Wichita State	10	–	8	.556	22	–	15	.595
Tulsa	8	–	10	.444	18	–	14	.563
South Florida	8	–	10	.444	24	–	14	.632
UConn	6	–	12	.333	16	–	17	.485
SMU	6	–	12	.333	15	–	17	.469
East Carolina	3	–	15	.167	10	–	21	.323
Tulane	0	–	18	.000	4	–	27	.129
† 2019 AAC tournament winner Rankings from AP poll

The 2018–19 Tulsa Golden Hurricane men's basketball team represented the University of Tulsa during the 2018–19 NCAA Division I men's basketball season. The Golden Hurricane, led by fifth-year head coach Frank Haith, played their home games at the Reynolds Center in Tulsa, Oklahoma as members of the American Athletic Conference. They finished the season 18–14, 8–10 in AAC play to finish in a tie for seventh place. They lost in the first round of the AAC tournament to SMU.

== Previous season ==
The Golden Hurricane finished the 2017–18 season 19–12, 12–6 in AAC play to finish in fourth place. They lost in the quarterfinals of the AAC tournament to Memphis.

== Offseason ==
=== Departures ===
Name	Number	Pos.	Height	Weight	Year	Hometown	Reason for departure
Junior Etou	0	F	6'7"	235	RS Senior	Republic of the Congo	Graduated
Jaleel Wheeler	13	G	6'4"	195	Senior	Newark, NJ	Graduated
Corey Henderson Jr.	32	G	6'5"	180	Senior	Abbeville, SC	Graduated
Geno Artison	35	F	6'9"	205	RS Junior	Seattle, WA	Transferred to USAO

=== Incoming transfers ===
Name	Number	Pos.	Height	Weight	Year	Hometown	Notes
Chris Barnes	0	G	6'3"	180	RS Sophomore	Compton, CA	Angelina College
Reggie Jones	22	G/F	6'6"	203	Junior	Marion, IN	Western Michigan
Zeke Moore	23	G	6'6"	175	RS Sophomore	St. Louis, MO	Southwestern Illinois College
Peter Hewitt	32	F	6'10"	220	RS Sophomore	Mountain View, CA	Las Positas College
Simon Falokun	44	F	6'8"	220	Sophomore	Houston, TX	Dawson College

== Roster ==
2018–19 Tulsa Golden Hurricane men's basketball team
Players
Coaches

Pos.	#	Name	Height	Weight	Year	Previous school	Hometown
G	0	Chris Barnes	6 ft 4 in (1.93 m)	200 lb (91 kg)	RS So	Compton HS; UTEP; Angelina College	Compton, CA
F	1	Martins Igbanu	6 ft 8 in (2.03 m)	235 lb (107 kg)	Jr	Covenant Christian Ministries Academy	Lagos, Nigeria
G/F	2	DaQuan Jeffries	6 ft 5 in (1.96 m)	230 lb (104 kg)	Sr	Santa Fe HS; Oral Roberts; Western Texas CC	Edmond, OK
G	3	Elijah Joiner	6 ft 3 in (1.91 m)	200 lb (91 kg)	So	Curie Metropolitan HS	Chicago, IL
G	4	Sterling Taplin	6 ft 1 in (1.85 m)	195 lb (88 kg)	Sr	St. Thomas More School	Williamsville, NY
G	5	Lawson Korita	6 ft 5 in (1.96 m)	205 lb (93 kg)	Jr	Pulaski Academy	Little Rock, AR
G	10	Curran Scott	6 ft 4 in (1.93 m)	208 lb (94 kg)	RS Jr	Edmond Memorial HS; Charlotte	Edmond, OK
G	11	Darien Jackson	6 ft 2 in (1.88 m)	189 lb (86 kg)	So	Blue Valley Northwest HS	Overland Park, KS
G	13	George Christopoulos (W)	6 ft 0 in (1.83 m)	167 lb (76 kg)	Fr	Warner Christian Academy	Nea Smyrni, Greece
G	14	Lindsay Deline Jr. (W)	5 ft 11 in (1.8 m)	189 lb (86 kg)	Sr	Heritage Hall HS; Fort Scott Community College	Midwest City, OK
G	22	Reggie Jones (redshirt)	6 ft 6 in (1.98 m)	210 lb (95 kg)	Jr	Marion HS; Western Michigan	Marion, IN
G	23	Zeke Moore (T)	6 ft 7 in (2.01 m)	210 lb (95 kg)	RS So	Riverview Gardens HS; Saint Louis	St. Louis, MO
F	32	Pete Hewitt	6 ft 10 in (2.08 m)	225 lb (102 kg)	RS So	Saint Francis HS; Las Positas College	Mountain View, CA
F	34	Alex Foree (W)	6 ft 5 in (1.96 m)	214 lb (97 kg)	Sr	Southside HS	Fort Smith, AR
F	41	Jeriah Horne	6 ft 7 in (2.01 m)	220 lb (100 kg)	RS So	The Barstow School; Nebraska	Overland Park, KS
F	44	Simon Falokun	6 ft 8 in (2.03 m)	240 lb (109 kg)	So	Alief Taylor HS; Dawson College	Houston, TX

Head coach

- Frank Haith (Elon)

Assistant coach(es)

- Ken McDonald (Providence)
- Kenton Paulino (Texas)
- Shea Seals (Tulsa)

Legend

- (C) Team captain
- (S) Suspended
- (I) Ineligible
- (W) Walk-on
- (T) Transferred
- Injured
- Current redshirt

Roster

- January 7, 2019 – Zeke Moore elected to transfer to SIU Edwardsville after the fall semester.

== Schedule and results ==
Date time, TV	Rank^{#}	Opponent^{#}	Result	Record	Site (attendance) city, state
Exhibition
November 2, 2018*; 6:00 pm		Northeastern State	W 95–60		Reynolds Center (3,246); Tulsa, OK
Non-conference regular season
November 6, 2018*; 7:00 pm, ESPN3		Alcorn State	W 73–56	1–0	Reynolds Center (3,128); Tulsa, OK
November 10, 2018*; 3:30 pm, ESPN3		South Carolina State	W 74–52	2–0	Reynolds Center (3,251); Tulsa, OK
November 16, 2018*; 12:00 pm		California Baptist; Las Vegas Holiday Invitational	W 82–79	3–0	Reynolds Center (6,330); Tulsa, OK
November 19, 2018*; 7:00 pm		Little Rock; Las Vegas Holiday Invitational	W 88–78	4–0	Reynolds Center (3,118); Tulsa, OK
November 22, 2018*; 3:00 pm, FS1		vs. No. 6 Nevada; Las Vegas Holiday Invitational semifinals	L 86–96	4–1	Orleans Arena; Paradise, NV
November 23, 2018*; 11:30 pm, FS1		vs. Southern Illinois; Las Vegas Holiday Invitational 3rd place game	L 69–79	4–2	Orleans Arena; Paradise, NV
November 27, 2018*; 7:00 pm, ESPN3		Texas–Arlington	W 72–58	5–2	Reynolds Center (3,107); Tulsa, OK
December 1, 2018*; 4:00 pm, P12N		at Utah	L 64–69	5–3	Jon M. Huntsman Center (10,775); Salt Lake City, UT
December 5, 2018*; 7:00 pm, CBSSN		Oklahoma State	W 74–71	6–3	Reynolds Center (7,145); Tulsa, OK
December 8, 2018*; 3:30 pm, CBSSN		No. 16 Kansas State	W 47–46	7–3	Reynolds Center (5,719); Tulsa, OK
December 13, 2018*; 7:00 pm, ESPN3		New Orleans	W 70–60	8–3	Reynolds Center (3,570); Tulsa, OK
December 16, 2018*; 2:30 pm, CBSSN		vs. Dayton; Hall of Fame Holiday Showcase	W 72–67	9–3	Mohegan Sun Arena; Uncasville, CT
December 22, 2018*; 7:00 pm		at Oral Roberts; PSO Mayor's Cup	W 69–59	10–3	Mabee Center (4,102); Tulsa, OK
AAC regular season
January 2, 2019; 7:00 pm, ESPN3		at No. 19 Houston	L 56–74	10–4 (0–1)	Fertitta Center (6,420); Houston, TX
January 5, 2019; 5:00 pm, ESPNU		South Florida	W 78–75	11–4 (1–1)	Reynolds Center (4,025); Tulsa, OK
January 10, 2019; 6:00 pm, ESPN2		Cincinnati; Thursday Night Showcase	L 65–70 ^{OT}	11–5 (1–2)	Reynolds Center (4,342); Tulsa, OK
January 12, 2019; 5:00 pm, ESPNU		at SMU	L 57–77	11–6 (1–3)	Moody Coliseum (6,001); Dallas, TX
January 16, 2019; 6:00 pm, ESPNews		UConn	W 89–83	12–6 (2–3)	Reynolds Center; Tulsa, OK
January 19, 2019; 11:00 am, ESPNU		at UCF; Saturday Showcase	L 62–64	12–7 (2–4)	CFE Arena (4,155); Orlando, FL
January 24, 2019; 6:00 pm, ESPN2		at Cincinnati; Thursday Night Showcase	L 64–88	12–8 (2–5)	Fifth Third Arena (10,484); Cincinnati, OH
January 27, 2019; 1:00 pm, ESPNews		No. 17 Houston	L 65–77	12–9 (2–6)	Reynolds Center (4,023); Tulsa, OK
January 30, 2019; 7:00 pm, ESPNews		Memphis	W 95–79	13–9 (3–6)	Reynolds Center (4,018); Tulsa, OK
February 2, 2019; 1:00 pm, ESPNU		at Wichita State	L 68–79	13–10 (3–7)	Charles Koch Arena (10,278); Wichita, KS
February 9, 2019; 11:00 am, ESPNU		Temple	W 76–58	14–10 (4–7)	Reynolds Center (4,276); Tulsa, OK
February 14, 2019; 6:00 pm, ESPNU		at Tulane	W 80–57	15–10 (5–7)	Devlin Fieldhouse (1,250); New Orleans, LA
February 17, 2019; 1:00 pm, ESPN3		at East Carolina	W 87–83 ^{OT}	16–10 (6–7)	Williams Arena (4,248); Greenville, SC
February 20, 2019; 8:00 pm, ESPNU		Wichita State	L 60–81	16–11 (6–8)	Reynolds Center (5,002); Tulsa, OK
February 23, 2019; 11:00 am, ESPNews		at Temple	L 73–84	16–12 (6–9)	Liacouras Center (7,183); Philadelphia, PA
February 28, 2019; 8:00 pm, ESPNU		Tulane	W 72–64	17–12 (7–9)	Reynolds Center (3,526); Tulsa, OK
March 3, 2019; 3:00 pm, ESPNU		East Carolina	W 91–78	18–12 (8–9)	Reynolds Center (3,507); Tulsa, OK
March 9, 2019; 8:30 pm, ESPNU		at Memphis	L 63–66	18–13 (8–10)	FedEx Forum (17,611); Memphis, TN
AAC tournament
March 14, 2019; 7:00 pm, ESPNU	(7)	vs. (10) SMU; First round	L 65–74	18–14	FedEx Forum (7,476); Memphis, TN
*Non-conference game. ^{#}Rankings from AP Poll. (#) Tournament seedings in parentheses. All times are in Central Time.
