= 2018–19 UCF Knights men's basketball team =

American college basketball season

2018–19 UCF Knights men's basketball

Myrtle Beach Invitational champions

NCAA tournament, Second Round
- Conference: American Athletic Conference
- Record: 24–9 (13–5 AAC)
- Head coach: Johnny Dawkins (3rd season)
- Assistant coaches: Kevin Norris (3rd season); Vince Taylor (2nd season); Robbie Laing (3rd season)
- Home arena: CFE Arena

2018–19 American Athletic Conference men's basketball standings
	Conf.				Overall
Team	W		L	PCT	W		L	PCT
No. 11 Houston	16	–	2	.889	33	–	4	.892
No. 22 Cincinnati †	14	–	4	.778	28	–	7	.800
Temple	13	–	5	.722	23	–	10	.697
UCF	13	–	5	.722	24	–	9	.727
Memphis	11	–	7	.611	22	–	14	.611
Wichita State	10	–	8	.556	22	–	15	.595
Tulsa	8	–	10	.444	18	–	14	.563
South Florida	8	–	10	.444	24	–	14	.632
UConn	6	–	12	.333	16	–	17	.485
SMU	6	–	12	.333	15	–	17	.469
East Carolina	3	–	15	.167	10	–	21	.323
Tulane	0	–	18	.000	4	–	27	.129
† 2019 AAC tournament winner Rankings from AP poll

The 2018–19 UCF Knights men's basketball team represented the University of Central Florida during the 2018–19 NCAA Division I men's basketball season. The Knights were members of the American Athletic Conference. The Knights, in the program's 50th season of basketball, were led by third-year head coach Johnny Dawkins and played their home games at the CFE Arena on the university's main campus in Orlando, Florida. They finished the season 24–9, 13–5 in AAC play to finish in a tie for third place. They lost in the quarterfinals of the AAC tournament to Memphis. They received an at-large bid to the NCAA tournament, where they defeated VCU in the first round before losing in the second round to Duke.

== Previous season ==
The Knights finished the 2017–18 season 19–13 overall and 9–9 in AAC play to finish in sixth place. In the AAC tournament, they defeated East Carolina in the first round before losing to Houston in the quarterfinals. Despite having 19 wins, they did not participate in a postseason tournament.

== Offseason ==
=== Departures ===
Name	Number	Pos.	Height	Weight	Year	Hometown	Reason for departure
A. J. Davis	3	G/F	6'9"	215	RS senior	Atlanta, GA	Graduated
Daniel Lewis	13	G	6'5"	175	Freshman	Atlanta, GA	Transferred to Kennesaw State
Brock Stephenson	20	G	6'0"	190	Sophomore	Miami, FL	Left team
Tate Morse	25	G	6'4"	165	Senior	Orlando, FL	Graduated
Djordjije Mumin	33	G	6'5"	210	Senior	Podgorica, Montenegro	Graduated
Nathan Laing	51	G	6'1"	185	RS senior	Lillington, NC	Graduated

=== Incoming transfers ===
Name	Number	Pos.	Height	Weight	Year	Hometown	Previous school
Ibrahim Doumbia	14	C	6'10"	205	Sophomore	Miami, FL	South Carolina
Frank Bertz	20	G	6'5"	175	Junior	Hesperia, CA	East Los Angeles College

=== 2018 recruiting class ===
College recruiting
Name	Hometown	School	Height	Weight	Commit date
Andreas Fuller Jr. SG	Saint Petersburg, FL	Saint Andrews School	6 ft 6 in (1.98 m)	190 lb (86 kg)	
Andreas Fuller Jr. SG	Recruit ratings: Scout: Rivals: (75)				
Overall recruit ranking:
Note: In many cases, Scout, Rivals, 247Sports, On3, and ESPN may conflict in their listings of height and weight.; In these cases, the average was taken. ESPN grades are on a 100-point scale.; Sources: "2018 Team Ranking". Rivals.

== Roster ==
2018–19 UCF Knights men's basketball team
Players
Coaches

Pos.	#	Name	Height	Weight	Year	Previous school	Hometown
G	1	B. J. Taylor	6 ft 2 in (1.88 m)	200 lb (91 kg)	RS Sr	William R. Boone High School	Orlando, Florida
G	2	Terrell Allen	6 ft 2 in (1.88 m)	185 lb (84 kg)	RS Jr	Drexel	Upper Marlboro, Maryland
G	3	Dre Fuller Jr.	6 ft 5 in (1.96 m)	200 lb (91 kg)	Fr	Admiral Farragut Academy	Fayetteville, North Carolina
G	4	Ceasar DeJesus	6 ft 3 in (1.91 m)	195 lb (88 kg)	RS So	Mt. Zion Prep	Jersey City, New Jersey
F	5	Myles Douglas	6 ft 8 in (2.03 m)	215 lb (98 kg)	So	Aberdeen High School	Edgewood, Maryland
G	10	Dayon Griffin	6 ft 4 in (1.93 m)	208 lb (94 kg)	RS Sr	Louisiana Tech	St. Petersburg, Florida
F	11	Rokas Ulvydas	6 ft 11 in (2.11 m)	235 lb (107 kg)	RS Jr	Texas Tech	Kaunas, Lithuania
G	12	Xavier Grant (W)	6 ft 3 in (1.91 m)	180 lb (82 kg)	Fr	American Heritage School	Fort Lauderdale, Florida
G	13	Levy Renaud (W)	6 ft 2 in (1.88 m)	180 lb (82 kg)	Fr	NSU University School	Fort Lauderdale, Florida
F	14	Ibrahim Famouke Doumbia (redshirt)	6 ft 7 in (2.01 m)	200 lb (91 kg)	So	South Carolina	Bamako, Mali
G/F	15	Aubrey Dawkins	6 ft 6 in (1.98 m)	205 lb (93 kg)	RS Jr	Michigan	Palo Alto, California
G	20	Frank Bertz	6 ft 5 in (1.96 m)	175 lb (79 kg)	Jr	East Los Angeles College	Hesperia, California
F	21	Chad Brown	6 ft 9 in (2.06 m)	240 lb (109 kg)	Sr	Deltona High School	Deltona, Florida
G	22	Chance McSpadden	6 ft 4 in (1.93 m)	184 lb (83 kg)	RS Jr	Winter Haven High School	Winter Haven, Florida
C	24	Tacko Fall	7 ft 6 in (2.29 m)	295 lb (134 kg)	Sr	Liberty Christian Prep	Dakar, Senegal
F	25	Ryan Anders (W)	6 ft 6 in (1.98 m)	220 lb (100 kg)	Fr	Wharton High School	Tampa, Florida
G	31	Anthony Catotti (W)	6 ft 4 in (1.93 m)	200 lb (91 kg)	RS Sr	Seminole High School	Oviedo, Florida
C	35	Collin Smith	6 ft 11 in (2.11 m)	235 lb (107 kg)	RS So	George Washington	Jacksonville, Florida

Head coach

- Johnny Dawkins (Duke)

Assistant coach(es)

- Kevin Norris (Miami (FL))
- Vince Taylor (Duke)
- Robbie Laing (Troy)

Legend

- (C) Team captain
- (S) Suspended
- (I) Ineligible
- (W) Walk-on
- Injured
- Current redshirt

Roster

== Schedule and results ==
On March 2, UCF defeated (#8 AP Poll/#6 Coaches Poll) Houston at Fertitta Center, stopping the nation's longest home winning streak at 33. With the win, UCF entered the AP Poll for the first time since the 2010–11 UCF Knights spent four weeks in the poll, peaking at 19.

Date time, TV	Rank^{#}	Opponent^{#}	Result	Record	Site (attendance) city, state
Exhibition
October 29, 2018*; 7:00 pm		Flagler	W 86–69		CFE Arena; Orlando, FL
Non-conference regular season
November 6, 2018*; 6:30 pm, ESPN3		Rider	W 84–70	1–0	CFE Arena (4,870); Orlando, FL
November 11, 2018*; 3:00 pm, ESPN3		Florida Atlantic	L 79–80	1–1	CFE Arena (4,304); Orlando, FL
November 15, 2018*; 1:30 pm, ESPN3		vs. Cal State Fullerton; Myrtle Beach Invitational quarterfinal	W 68–52	2–1	HTC Center (1,317); Conway, SC
November 16, 2018*; 1:00 pm, ESPN2		vs. Saint Joseph's; Myrtle Beach Invitational semifinal	W 77–57	3–1	HTC Center (1,050); Conway, SC
November 18, 2018*; 6:30 pm, ESPN2		vs. Western Kentucky; Myrtle Beach Invitational championship	W 78–62	4–1	HTC Center (3,018); Conway, SC
November 24, 2018*; 6:00 pm, ESPN3		Northern Kentucky	W 66–53	5–1	CFE Arena (3,374); Orlando, FL
November 29, 2018*; 7:00 pm, ESPNU		Alabama	W 70–64	6–1	CFE Arena (4,449); Orlando, FL
December 2, 2018*; 3:00 pm, ESPNU		at Missouri	L 62–64 ^{OT}	6–2	Mizzou Arena (10,067); Columbia, MO
December 8, 2018*; 1:00 pm, ESPN3		Grambling State	W 70–45	7–2	CFE Arena (3,798); Orlando, FL
December 11, 2018*; 7:00 pm, ESPN3		Georgia Southern	W 95–88	8–2	CFE Arena (3,632); Orlando, FL
December 16, 2018*; 3:00 pm, ESPN3		Stetson	W 90–65	9–2	CFE Arena (3,660); Orlando, FL
December 21, 2018*; 7:00 pm, ESPN3		Illinois State	W 77–56	10–2	CFE Arena (3,885); Orlando, FL
AAC regular season
January 2, 2019; 7:00 pm, ESPNews		Temple	W 78–73	11–2 (1–0)	CFE Arena (3,884); Orlando, FL
January 5, 2019; 12:00 pm, ESPNews		at UConn	W 65–53	12–2 (2–0)	XL Center (10,541); Hartford, CT
January 13, 2019; 4:00 pm, ESPNU		East Carolina	W 76–65	13–2 (3–0)	CFE Arena (4,692); Orlando, FL
January 16, 2019; 10:00 pm, CBSSN		at Wichita State	L 67–75	13–3 (3–1)	Charles Koch Arena (10,506); Wichita, KS
January 19, 2019; 12:00 pm, ESPNU		Tulsa	W 64–62	14–3 (4–1)	CFE Arena (4,155); Orlando, FL
January 23, 2019; 8:00 pm, ESPN3		at Tulane	W 75–50	15–3 (5–1)	Devlin Fieldhouse (1,308); New Orleans, LA
January 27, 2019; 4:00 pm, CBSSN		at Memphis	L 57–77	15–4 (5–2)	FedEx Forum (17,046); Memphis, TN
January 31, 2019; 9:00 pm, ESPNU		UConn	W 73–67	16–4 (6–2)	CFE Arena (5,016); Orlando, FL
February 7, 2019; 7:00 pm, CBSSN		No. 12 Houston	L 68–77	16–5 (6–3)	CFE Arena (6,292); Orlando, FL
February 10, 2019; 2:00 pm, ESPNews		at SMU	W 71–65	17–5 (7–3)	Moody Coliseum (5,989); Dallas, TX
February 13, 2019; 7:00 pm, ESPNews		South Florida; War on I-4	W 78–65	18–5 (8–3)	CFE Arena (4,719); Orlando, FL
February 16, 2019; 6:00 pm, ESPN2		Memphis	W 79–72	19–5 (9–3)	CFE Arena (5,458); Orlando, FL
February 21, 2019; 7:00 pm, ESPN2		at Cincinnati	L 55–60	19–6 (9–4)	Fifth Third Arena (12,377); Cincinnati, OH
February 24, 2019; 12:00 pm, CBSSN		SMU	W 95–48	20–6 (10–4)	CFE Arena (4,978); Orlando, FL
February 27, 2019; 7:00 pm, ESPNews		at South Florida; War on I-4	W 75–63	21–6 (11–4)	Yuengling Center (7,231); Tampa, FL
March 2, 2019; 4:00 pm, ESPN		at No. 8 Houston	W 69–64	22–6 (12–4)	Fertitta Center (7,039); Houston, TX
March 7, 2019; 7:00 pm, ESPN2	No. 25	No. 20 Cincinnati	W 58–55	23–6 (13–4)	CFE Arena (9,141); Orlando, FL
March 9, 2019; 4:00 pm, ESPN2	No. 25	at Temple	L 62–67	23–7 (13–5)	Liacouras Center (9,951); Philadelphia, PA
American Athletic Conference tournament
March 15, 2019; 3:00 pm, ESPN2	(4)	at (5) Memphis; Quarterfinals	L 55–79	23–8	FedEx Forum (7,610); Memphis, TN
NCAA tournament
March 22, 2019*; 9:40 pm, CBS	(9 E)	vs. (8 E) VCU; First Round	W 73–58	24–8	Colonial Life Arena (16,219); Columbia, SC
March 24, 2019*; 5:15 pm, CBS	(9 E)	vs. (1 E) No. 1 Duke; Second Round	L 76–77	24–9	Colonial Life Arena (16,332); Columbia, SC
*Non-conference game. ^{#}Rankings from AP Poll. (#) Tournament seedings in parentheses. E=East. All times are in Eastern Time.

== Rankings ==
Ranking movements Legend: ██ Increase in ranking ██ Decrease in ranking — = Not ranked RV = Received votes
	Week																				
Poll	Pre	1	2	3	4	5	6	7	8	9	10	11	12	13	14	15	16	17	18	19	Final
AP	RV	—	—	—	RV	—	—	—	—	—	RV	RV	—	—	—	—	—	—	25	RV	Not released
Coaches	RV	RV^	RV	RV	RV	—	RV	—	RV	RV	RV	RV	RV	—	—	—	—	—	RV	RV	RV

*AP does not release post-NCAA Tournament rankings.
^Coaches did not release a Week 2 poll.
