= Jarron Cumberland =

American basketball player (born 1997)

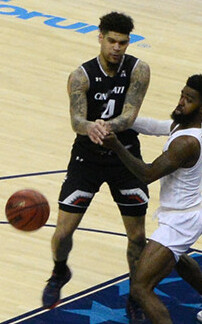
- Cumberland during the 2019 AAC tournament

No. 34 – Osceola Magic
- Position: Shooting guard
- League: NBA G League

Personal information
- Born: September 22, 1997 (age 29) Wilmington, Ohio, U.S.
- Listed height: 6 ft 5 in (1.96 m)
- Listed weight: 205 lb (93 kg)

Career information
- High school: Wilmington (Wilmington, Ohio)
- College: Cincinnati (2016–2020)
- NBA draft: 2020: undrafted
- Playing career: 2021–present

Career history
- 2021: Rio Grande Valley Vipers
- 2021: Raptors 905
- 2021–2022: Delaware Blue Coats
- 2021–2022: Portland Trail Blazers
- 2023: Caballeros de Culiacán
- 2023–2024: Delaware Blue Coats
- 2024: Petro de Luanda
- 2024–2025: Delaware Blue Coats
- 2025: Caballeros de Culiacán
- 2025: Winnipeg Sea Bears
- 2025: South Bay Lakers
- 2025–present: Osceola Magic
- 2026: Maccabi Ra'anana

Career highlights
- AAC Player of the Year (2019); AAC Co-Sixth Man of the Year (2017); 2× First-team All-AAC (2019, 2020); AAC tournament MVP (2019)
- Stats at NBA.com
- Stats at Basketball Reference

Jarron Cumberland (born September 22, 1997) is an American professional basketball player for the Osceola Magic of the NBA G League. He played college basketball for the Cincinnati Bearcats.

== High school career ==
Cumberland attended Wilmington High School in Wilmington, Ohio. He committed to playing college basketball for Cincinnati over offers from Michigan, Florida State, Xavier and others.

== College career ==
As a freshman, Cumberland came off the bench, averaging 19.1 minutes, 8.3 points and 2.4 rebounds per game, earning a place on the American Athletic Conference (AAC) all-freshman team and he shared Sixth Man of the Year honors with Ben Emelogu of SMU. As a sophomore, Cumberland moved into the starting lineup, averaging 11.5 points, 4 rebounds and 2.9 assists per game as the Bearcats went 31–5, earning a 2 seed in the 2018 NCAA tournament. The team's Final Four hopes were cut short with a second-round loss to Nevada.

After losing stars Gary Clark, Jacob Evans and Kyle Washington for the 2018–19 season, junior Cumberland moved into the primary scoring role for the Bearcats. Cumberland averaged 18.8 points, 4.4 rebounds and 3.6 assists per game. At the conclusion of the season, Cumberland was named AAC Player of the Year.

Cumberland suffered a foot injury in the preseason. Three games into his senior season, Cumberland was benched for one game by new coach John Brannen. Cumberland's ill-advised halfcourt shot contributed to a one-point loss to Colgate on December 14, 2019. In January 2020, Cumberland scored 22 points in a win at Temple, including 14 of the last 16 points. At the conclusion of the regular season. Cumberland was named to the First Team All-AAC. Cumberland averaged 15.5 points and 4.9 assists per game as a senior. He finished his career seventh in school history in both points (1,782) and assists (415).

== Professional career ==
Cumberland was selected 12th overall in the 2021 NBA G League draft by the Rio Grande Valley Vipers. He made his debut in their season opener on February 10, 2021.

On February 26, 2021, Cumberland was traded to the Raptors 905 in exchange for center Dewan Hernandez.

On October 2, 2021, Cumberland was traded to the Delaware Blue Coats. He was named MVP of the G League Winter Showcase, after posting 24 points, eight rebounds and six assists in the 104–98 championship game victory against the Oklahoma City Blue.

On December 25, 2021, Cumberland signed a 10-day contract with the Portland Trail Blazers. Cumberland appeared in three games, scoring two points and collecting three rebounds during his stint. On January 5, 2022, following the expiration of his 10-day deal, Cumberland was reacquired by the Delaware Blue Coats of the NBA G League.

On April 25, 2023, Cumberland signed with the Caballeros de Culiacán of the Circuito de Baloncesto de la Costa del Pacífico, making his debut that night.

On October 29, 2023, Cumberland re-joined the Delaware Blue Coats, but was waived on December 9. Six days later, he was reacquired by the Blue Coats.

On September 5, 2024, Cumberland signed with Petro de Luanda of the Unitel Basket.

On October 28, 2024, Cumberland rejoined the Delaware Blue Coats.

For the 2025–26 season, Cumberland joined the South Bay Lakers of the G League. On December 24, he moved to the Osceola Magic in a three-team trade. Cumberland played 12 games for South Bay, averaging 4.5 points and 4 assists per game.

On September 23, 2026, Cumberland signed an Exhibit 10 contract with the Orlando Magic, but was waived by the team the same day.

== Career statistics ==
Legend
GP	Games played	GS	Games started	MPG	Minutes per game
FG%	Field goal percentage	3P%	3-point field goal percentage	FT%	Free throw percentage
RPG	Rebounds per game	APG	Assists per game	SPG	Steals per game
BPG	Blocks per game	PPG	Points per game	**Bold**	Career high

=== NBA ===
Year	Team	GP	GS	MPG	FG%	3P%	FT%	RPG	APG	SPG	BPG	PPG
2021–22	Portland	3	0	4.0	.500	.000	—	1.0	.3	.0	.0	.7
Career		3	0	4.0	.500	.000	—	1.0	.3	.0	.0	.7

=== College ===
Year	Team	GP	GS	MPG	FG%	3P%	FT%	RPG	APG	SPG	BPG	PPG
2016–17	Cincinnati	35	0	19.1	**.493**	.355	.644	2.4	1.5	1.0	.3	8.3
2017–18	Cincinnati	**36**	**36**	28.9	.409	.339	.678	4.0	2.9	1.0	.4	11.5
2018–19	Cincinnati	35	35	**32.5**	.404	**.388**	**.773**	**4.4**	3.6	**1.1**	.4	**18.8**
2019–20	Cincinnati	27	27	32.4	.384	.313	.753	3.8	**4.9**	1.0	**.7**	15.5
Career		133	98	28.0	.414	.352	.730	3.6	3.1	1.0	.4	13.4
