= 2018–19 Memphis Tigers men's basketball team =

American college basketball season

2018–19 Memphis Tigers men's basketball

NIT, Second Round
- Conference: American Athletic Conference
- Record: 22–14 (11–7 AAC)
- Head coach: Penny Hardaway (1st season)
- Assistant coaches: Tony Madlock; Mike Miller; Sam Mitchell
- Home arena: FedExForum

2018–19 American Athletic Conference men's basketball standings
	Conf.				Overall
Team	W		L	PCT	W		L	PCT
No. 11 Houston	16	–	2	.889	33	–	4	.892
No. 22 Cincinnati †	14	–	4	.778	28	–	7	.800
Temple	13	–	5	.722	23	–	10	.697
UCF	13	–	5	.722	24	–	9	.727
Memphis	11	–	7	.611	22	–	14	.611
Wichita State	10	–	8	.556	22	–	15	.595
Tulsa	8	–	10	.444	18	–	14	.563
South Florida	8	–	10	.444	24	–	14	.632
UConn	6	–	12	.333	16	–	17	.485
SMU	6	–	12	.333	15	–	17	.469
East Carolina	3	–	15	.167	10	–	21	.323
Tulane	0	–	18	.000	4	–	27	.129
† 2019 AAC tournament winner Rankings from AP poll

The 2018–19 Memphis Tigers men's basketball team represented the University of Memphis in the 2018–19 NCAA Division I men's basketball season. This was the 98th season of Tiger basketball, the first under head coach Penny Hardaway, and the sixth as members of the American Athletic Conference. They played their home games at the FedEx Forum. They finished the season 22–14, 11–7 in AAC play to finish in fifth place. They defeated Tulane and UCF to advance to the semifinals of the AAC tournament where they lost to Houston. They were invited to the National Invitation Tournament where they defeated San Diego in the first round before losing in the second round to Creighton.

== Previous season ==
The Tigers finished the 2017–18 season 21–13, 10–8 in AAC play to finish in a tie for fifth place. They defeated Tulsa in the AAC tournament before losing to Cincinnati in the semifinals. Despite having 21 wins, they did not participate in a postseason tournament for the second time.

On March 14, 2018, the school fired head coach Tubby Smith after two years. On March 20, the school hired former Memphis player and NBA star Penny Hardaway as coach.

== Offseason ==
=== Departures ===
Name	Number	Pos.	Height	Weight	Year	Hometown	Notes
Jamal Johnson	1	G	6'4	180	Sophomore	Birmingham, AL	Transferred to Auburn
Jimario Rivers	2	G/F	6'8	193	Senior	Clarksville, TN	Graduated
Malik Rhodes	11	G	6'2	180	Junior	Cincinnati, OH	Transferred to Cal State San Bernardino
David Nickelberry	15	G	6'7	202	Sophomore	Orlando, FL	Transferred to Trinty Valley CC
Karim Sameh Azab	23	F	6'11	290	Sophomore	Giza, Egypt	Deceased
Kytrel Williams	30	G	6'3	207	Senior	Memphis, TN	Graduated
Alex Moffatt	32	F	6'5	223	Senior	Somerville, TN	Graduated

=== Incoming transfers ===
Name	Num	Pos.	Height	Weight	Year	Hometown	Notes
Isaiah Maurice	14	F/C	6'10"	225	Junior	Durham, NC	Junior college transferred from South Plains College.
Lance Thomas	15	F	6'8"	210	Sophomore	Norcross, GA	Transferred from Louisville. Under NCAA transfer rules, Thomas will have to sit out for the 2018–19 season. Will have three years of remaining eligibility.

=== 2018 recruiting class ===
College recruiting information
Name	Hometown	School	Height	Weight	Commit date
Alex Lomax; PG	Memphis, TN	Memphis East HS	5 ft 11 in (1.80 m)	189 lb (86 kg)	Apr 4, 2018
Alex Lomax; PG	Recruit ratings: Scout: Rivals: 247Sports: ESPN: (80)				
Ryan Boyce; SF	Memphis, TN	Memphis East HS	6 ft 5 in (1.96 m)	180 lb (82 kg)	Jun 7, 2018
Ryan Boyce; SF	Recruit ratings: Scout: Rivals: 247Sports: ESPN: (80)				
Tyler Harris; PG	Memphis, TN	Cordova HS	5 ft 9 in (1.75 m)	155 lb (70 kg)	Apr 13, 2018
Tyler Harris; PG	Recruit ratings: Scout: Rivals: 247Sports: ESPN: (80)				
Antwann Jones; SG	Orlando, FL	Oak Ridge HS	6 ft 6 in (1.98 m)	210 lb (95 kg)	Apr 15, 2018
Antwann Jones; SG	Recruit ratings: Scout: Rivals: 247Sports: ESPN: (81)				
Jayden Hardaway; SG	Memphis, TN	IMG Academy (FL)	6 ft 4 in (1.93 m)	175 lb (79 kg)	Apr 3, 2018
Jayden Hardaway; SG	Recruit ratings: Scout: Rivals: 247Sports: ESPN:				
David Wingett; SG	Winnebago, NE	Bull City Prep (NC)	6 ft 7 in (2.01 m)	185 lb (84 kg)	May 9, 2018
David Wingett; SG	Recruit ratings: Scout: Rivals: 247Sports: ESPN: (79)				
Overall recruit ranking:
Note: In many cases, Scout, Rivals, 247Sports, On3, and ESPN may conflict in their listings of height and weight.; In these cases, the average was taken. ESPN grades are on a 100-point scale.; Sources: "2018 Team Ranking". Rivals.

=== 2019 recruiting class ===
College recruiting information (2019)
Name	Hometown	School	Height	Weight	Commit date
Malcolm Dandridge; C	Memphis, TN	East HS	6 ft 8 in (2.03 m)	200 lb (91 kg)	May 2, 2018
Malcolm Dandridge; C	Recruit ratings: Rivals: 247Sports: ESPN: (83)				
Overall recruit ranking:
Note: In many cases, Scout, Rivals, 247Sports, On3, and ESPN may conflict in their listings of height and weight.; In these cases, the average was taken. ESPN grades are on a 100-point scale.; Sources:

== Roster ==
2018–19 Memphis Tigers men's basketball team
Players
Coaches

Pos.	#	Name	Height	Weight	Year	Previous school	Hometown
F	0	Kyvon Davenport	6 ft 8 in (2.03 m)	215 lb (98 kg)	Sr	Georgia Highlands	Gainesville, Georgia
G	1	Tyler Harris	5 ft 9 in (1.75 m)	150 lb (68 kg)	Fr	Cordova High School	Memphis, Tennessee
G	2	Alex Lomax	5 ft 11 in (1.8 m)	190 lb (86 kg)	Fr	East HS	Memphis, Tennessee
G	3	Jeremiah Martin	6 ft 3 in (1.91 m)	185 lb (84 kg)	Sr	Mitchell High School	Memphis, Tennessee
G/F	4	Raynere Thornton	6 ft 6 in (1.98 m)	230 lb (104 kg)	Sr	Gordon State	Marietta, Georgia
G	5	Kareem Brewton Jr.	6 ft 2 in (1.88 m)	195 lb (88 kg)	Sr	Eastern Florida State	Claxton, Georgia
F	10	Mike Parks	6 ft 8 in (2.03 m)	250 lb (113 kg)	Sr	SW Mississippi CC	Cleveland, Ohio
G	11	Antwann Jones	6 ft 6 in (1.98 m)	205 lb (93 kg)	Fr	Oak Ridge High School	Orlando, Florida
F	12	Victor Enoh	6 ft 7 in (2.01 m)	250 lb (113 kg)	So	Greenforest Christian Academy	Decatur, Georgia
F	14	Isaiah Maurice	6 ft 10 in (2.08 m)	224 lb (102 kg)	Jr	South Plains JC	Durham, North Carolina
F	15	Lance Thomas (redshirt)	6 ft 8 in (2.03 m)	224 lb (102 kg)	So	Louisville	Norcross, Georgia
G	25	Jayden Hardaway (redshirt)	6 ft 4 in (1.93 m)	195 lb (88 kg)	Fr	IMG Academy	Memphis, Tennessee
G	30	Evin Olds (W)	5 ft 11 in (1.8 m)	175 lb (79 kg)	So	Harding Academy	Memphis, Tennessee
G	32	Ryan Boyce (redshirt)	6 ft 6 in (1.98 m)	185 lb (84 kg)	Fr	East HS	Memphis, Tennessee
G/F	50	David Wingett	6 ft 7 in (2.01 m)	200 lb (91 kg)	Fr	Bull City Prep	Winnebago, Nebraska

Head coach

- Penny Hardaway (Memphis)

Assistant coach(es)

- Tony Madlock (Memphis)
- Mike Miller (Florida)
- Sam Mitchell (Mercer)

Legend

- (C) Team captain
- (S) Suspended
- (I) Ineligible
- (W) Walk-on
- Injured
- Current redshirt

Roster

== Schedule and results ==
Date time, TV	Rank^{#}	Opponent^{#}	Result	Record	High points	High rebounds	High assists	Site (attendance) city, state
Exhibition
October 25, 2018*; 7:00 pm		LeMoyne–Owen	W 120–66		26 – Harris	10 – Brewton Jr.	9 – Lomax	FedEx Forum (6,373); Memphis, TN
November 2, 2018*; 7:00 pm		Christian Brothers	W 95–68		24 – Martin	8 – Maurice	8 – Lomax	FedEx Forum (14,004); Memphis, TN
Non-conference regular season
November 6, 2018*; 7:00 pm, ESPN3		Tennessee Tech	W 76–61	1–0	30 – Davenport	10 – Davenport	4 – Lomax	FedEx Forum (15,231); Memphis, TN
November 13, 2018*; 6:00 pm, SECN		at No. 22 LSU; AdvoCare Invitational non-bracket game	L 76–85	1–1	20 – Harris	6 – Parks Jr.	4 – Lomax	Maravich Center (9,295); Baton Rouge, LA
November 17, 2018*; 7:00 pm, ESPN3		Yale	W 109–102 ^{2OT}	2–1	22 – Harris	8 – Davenport	5 – Martin	FedEx Fourm (14,656); Memphis, TN
November 22, 2018*; 2:30 pm, ESPN2		vs. Oklahoma State; AdvoCare Invitational quarterfinals	L 64–84	2–2	14 – Harris	6 – Tied	5 – Martin	HP Field House (2,964); Lake Buena Vista, FL
November 23, 2018*; 1:00 pm, ESPN3		vs. Canisius; AdvoCare Invitational	W 71–63	3–2	16 – Davenport	10 – Davenport	5 – Lomax	HP Field House (2,672); Lake Buena Vista, FL
November 25, 2018*; 5:30pm, ESPNU		vs. College of Charleston; AdvoCare Invitational	L 75–78	3–3	25 – Harris	11 – Tied	4 – Martin	HP Field House (1,933); Lake Buena Vista, FL
December 1, 2018*; 1:30 pm, ESPNU		vs. No. 20 Texas Tech; HoopHall Miami Invitational	L 67–78	3–4	17 – Harris	8 – Lomax	4 – Martin	American Airlines Arena; Miami, FL
December 4, 2018*; 7:00 pm, WLMT/ESPN3		South Dakota State	W 88–80	4–4	22 – Tied	9 – Thornton	4 – Tied	FedEx Forum (13,583); Memphis, TN
December 8, 2018*; 12:00 pm, ESPN3		UAB	W 94–76	5–4	24 – Harris	8 – Davenport	5 – Tied	FedEx Forum (14,652); Memphis, TN
December 15, 2018*; 11:00 am, ESPN2		No. 3 Tennessee	L 92–102	5–5	31 – Davenport	11 – Davenport	6 – Martin	FedEx Forum (18,528); Memphis, TN
December 19, 2018*; 7:00 pm, WLMT/ESPN3		Little Rock	W 99–89	6–5	22 – Martin	15 – Davenport	6 – Tied	FedEx Forum (13,599); Memphis, TN
December 22, 2018*; 2:00 pm, ESPN3		Tennessee State	W 99–41	7–5	14 – Martin	12 – Davenport	5 – Jones	FedEx Forum (15,378); Memphis, TN
December 29, 2018*; 12:00 pm, ESPN3		Florida A&M	W 96–65	8–5	22 – Martin	7 – Tied	8 – Martin	FedEx Forum (14,201); Memphis, TN
AAC regular season
January 3, 2019; 8:30 pm, CBSSN		Wichita State	W 85–74	9–5 (1–0)	25 – Davenport	8 – Lomax	5 – Lomax	FedEx Forum (15,068); Memphis, TN
January 6, 2019; 5:00 pm, ESPNews		at No. 19 Houston	L 77–90	9–6 (1–1)	25 – Brewton Jr.	7 – Thornton	4 – Lomax	Fertitta Center (7,039); Houston, TX
January 10, 2019; 8:00 pm, ESPNU		East Carolina	W 78–72	10–6 (2–1)	16 – Harris	11 – Davenport	3 – Tied	FedEx Forum (14,622); Memphis, TN
January 13, 2019; 5:00 pm, ESPNU		at Tulane	W 83–79	11–6 (3–1)	27 – Martin	8 – Thornton	3 – Tied	Devlin Fieldhouse (1,105); New Orleans, LA
January 19, 2019; 3:00 pm, ESPNU		SMU; Saturday Showcase	W 83–61	12–6 (4–1)	20 – Brewton Jr.	14 – Thornton	11 – Martin	FedEx Forum (16,673); Memphis, TN
January 24, 2019; 6:00 pm, CBSSN		at Temple	L 76–85	12–7 (4–2)	28 – Martin	9 – Davenport	3 – Tied	Liacouras Center (5,364); Philadelphia, PA
January 27, 2019; 3:00 pm, CBSSN		UCF	W 77–57	13–7 (5–2)	14 – Harris	11 – Thornton	7 – Martin	FedEx Forum (17,046); Memphis, TN
January 30, 2019; 7:00 pm, ESPNews		at Tulsa	L 79–95	13–8 (5–3)	18 – Harris	14 – Davenport	6 – Martin	Reynolds Center (4,018); Tulsa, OK
February 2, 2019; 11:00 am, ESPNU		at South Florida	L 78–84	13–9 (5–4)	41 – Martin	10 – Thornton	4 – Harris	Yuengling Center (4,573); Tampa, FL
February 7, 2019; 6:00 pm, ESPN2		No. 25 Cincinnati	L 64–69	13–10 (5–5)	26 – Martin	10 – Davenport	5 – Martin	FedEx Forum (16,363); Memphis, TN
February 10, 2019; 1:00 pm, CBSSN		UConn	W 78–71	14–10 (6–5)	26 – Davenport	8 – Thornton	6 – Martin	FedEx Forum (17,162); Memphis, TN
February 13, 2019; 6:00 pm, ESPN3		at East Carolina	W 79–69	15–10 (7–5)	31 – Martin	7 – Maurice	6 – Tied	Williams Arena (3,411); Greenville, NC
February 16, 2019; 5:00 pm, ESPN2		at UCF	L 72–79	15–11 (7–6)	25 – Martin	7 – Brewton Jr.	6 – Martin	CFE Arena (5,458); Orlando, FL
February 20, 2019; 6:00 pm, ESPNU		Tulane	W 102–76	16–11 (8–6)	43 – Martin	15 – Davenport	8 – Martin	FedEx Forum (14,747); Memphis, TN
February 23, 2019; 7:00 pm, ESPN2		at Wichita State	W 88–85	17–11 (9–6)	37 – Martin	9 – Thornton	3 – Brewton Jr.	Charles Koch Arena (10,506); Wichita, KS
February 26, 2019; 8:00 pm, ESPNU		Temple	W 81–73	18–11 (10–6)	30 – Martin	11 – Thornton	5 – Martin	FedEx Forum (14,652); Memphis, TN
March 2, 2019; 7:00 pm, ESPNU		at No. 23 Cincinnati	L 69–71	18–12 (10–7)	28 – Martin	7 – Maurice	5 – Martin	Fifth Third Arena (12,392); Cincinnati, OH
March 9, 2019; 8:30 pm, ESPNU		Tulsa	W 66–63	19–12 (11–7)	20 – Martin	6 – 2 Tied	6 – Martin	FedEx Forum (17,611); Memphis, TN
AAC Tournament
March 14, 2019; 2:00 pm, ESPNU	(5)	(12) Tulane; First Round	W 83–68	20–12	21 – Martin	13 – Parks Jr.	7 – Martin	FedExForum (8,046); Memphis, TN
March 15, 2019; 1:00 pm, ESPN2	(5)	(4) UCF; Quarterfinals	W 79–55	21–12	21 – Maurice	11 – Davenport	4 – Martin	FedExForum (7,610); Memphis, TN
March 16, 2019; 2:00 pm, ESPN2	(5)	(1) No. 11 Houston; Semifinals	L 58–61	21–13	23 – Martin	9 – Martin	1 – Tied	FedExForum (7,819); Memphis, TN
NIT Tournament
March 19, 2019*; 8:00 pm, ESPN3	(3)	(6) San Diego; First Round – TCU Bracket	W 74–60	22–13	21 – Martin	7 – Martin	3 – Brewton Jr.	FedExForum (8,138); Memphis, TN
March 22, 2019*; 7:30 pm, ESPNU	(3)	at (2) Creighton; Second Round – TCU Bracket	L 67–79	22–14	20 – Martin	6 – Jones	4 – Martin	CHI Health Center Omaha (7,031); Omaha, NE
*Non-conference game. ^{#}Rankings from AP Poll. (#) Tournament seedings in parentheses. All times are in Central Time.
