= 2018–19 East Carolina Pirates men's basketball team =

American college basketball season

2018–19 East Carolina Pirates men's basketball
- Conference: American Athletic Conference
- Record: 10–21 (3–15 AAC)
- Head coach: Joe Dooley (1st, 5th overall season)
- Assistant coaches: Steve Roccaforte; Raphael Chillious; Ken Potosnak
- Home arena: Williams Arena (8,000)

2018–19 American Athletic Conference men's basketball standings
	Conf.				Overall
Team	W		L	PCT	W		L	PCT
No. 11 Houston	16	–	2	.889	33	–	4	.892
No. 22 Cincinnati †	14	–	4	.778	28	–	7	.800
Temple	13	–	5	.722	23	–	10	.697
UCF	13	–	5	.722	24	–	9	.727
Memphis	11	–	7	.611	22	–	14	.611
Wichita State	10	–	8	.556	22	–	15	.595
Tulsa	8	–	10	.444	18	–	14	.563
South Florida	8	–	10	.444	24	–	14	.632
UConn	6	–	12	.333	16	–	17	.485
SMU	6	–	12	.333	15	–	17	.469
East Carolina	3	–	15	.167	10	–	21	.323
Tulane	0	–	18	.000	4	–	27	.129
† 2019 AAC tournament winner Rankings from AP poll

The 2018–19 East Carolina Pirates men's basketball team represented East Carolina University during the 2018–19 NCAA Division I men's basketball season. The Pirates were led by first year head coach, Joe Dooley, who previously coached the Pirates from 1995 to 1999, and played their home games at Williams Arena at Minges Coliseum as fifth-year members of the American Athletic Conference. The Pirates finished the season 10–21, 3–15 in AAC play to finish in 11th place. They lost in the first round of the AAC tournament to Wichita State.

== Previous season ==
The Pirates finished the 2017–18 season 10–20, 4–14 in AAC play to finish in 11th place. They lost in the first round of the AAC tournament to UCF.

Following a 2–4 start to the season, eighth-year head coach Jeff Lebo announced his resignation from ECU on November 29, 2017, and Perry was named interim head coach. On April 4, 2018, the school announced that Florida Gulf Coast head coach Joe Dooley, who coached the Pirates from 1995 to 1999, would return as head coach.

== Offseason ==
=== Departures ===
Name	Number	Pos.	Height	Weight	Year	Hometown	Reason for departure
Jeremy Sheppard	1	G	6'1"	160	Sophomore	Richmond, VA	Suspended, left team
Aaron Jackson	10	G	6'6"	215	RS Senior	Gahanna, OH	Graduated
Kentrell Barkley	15	G/F	6'5"	205	Junior	Durham, NC	Suspended, left team
B. J. Tyson	21	G	6'3"	190	Senior	Wadesboro, NC	Graduated
Jabari Craig	25	F/C	6'10"	235	Senior	Maumelle, AR	Graduated
Usman Haruna	35	F/C	6'11"	215	Junior	Kaduna, Nigeria	Transferred to Montana

=== Recruiting class of 2018 ===
College recruiting information
Name	Hometown	School	Height	Weight	Commit date
DeShaun Wade #72 SG	Virginia Beach, VA	The Miller School	6 ft 2 in (1.88 m)	190 lb (86 kg)	Jun 19, 2017
DeShaun Wade #72 SG	Recruit ratings: Scout: Rivals: 247Sports: (66)				
Jayden Gardner; PF	Wake Forest, NC	Heritage High School	6 ft 8 in (2.03 m)	225 lb (102 kg)	Sep 24, 2017
Jayden Gardner; PF	Recruit ratings: Scout: Rivals: 247Sports: (NR)				
Rico Quinton; C	Newbern, TN	Dyer County	6 ft 10 in (2.08 m)	200 lb (91 kg)	Nov 21, 2017
Rico Quinton; C	Recruit ratings: Scout: Rivals: 247Sports: (NR)				
Tae Hardy; G	Ellenwood, GA	Believe Prep Academy	6 ft 3 in (1.91 m)	195 lb (88 kg)	Jun 20, 2018
Tae Hardy; G	Recruit ratings: Scout: Rivals: 247Sports: (NR)				
Tyler Foster; SG	Baltimore, MD	Mount Zion Christian Academy	6 ft 5 in (1.96 m)	178 lb (81 kg)	Jun 20, 2018
Tyler Foster; SG	Recruit ratings: Scout: Rivals: 247Sports: (NR)				
Milan Stakic; C	Serbia	Believe Preparatory Academy	7 ft 2 in (2.18 m)	238 lb (108 kg)	Jun 3, 2018
Milan Stakic; C	Recruit ratings: Scout: Rivals: 247Sports: (NR)				
Overall recruit ranking:
Note: In many cases, Scout, Rivals, 247Sports, On3, and ESPN may conflict in their listings of height and weight.; In these cases, the average was taken. ESPN grades are on a 100-point scale.; Sources: "2018 Team Ranking". Rivals.

=== Recruiting class of 2019 ===
College recruiting information (2019)
Name	Hometown	School	Height	Weight	Commit date
Logan Curtis; SG	Baltimore, MD	Calvert High School	6 ft 4 in (1.93 m)	180 lb (82 kg)	Jun 23, 2018
Logan Curtis; SG	Recruit ratings: Scout: Rivals: 247Sports: (NR)				
Overall recruit ranking:
Note: In many cases, Scout, Rivals, 247Sports, On3, and ESPN may conflict in their listings of height and weight.; In these cases, the average was taken. ESPN grades are on a 100-point scale.; Sources: "2019 Team Ranking". Rivals.

== Roster ==
2018–19 East Carolina Pirates men's basketball team
Players
Coaches

Pos.	#	Name	Height	Weight	Year	Previous school	Hometown
G	0	Isaac Fleming	6 ft 3 in (1.91 m)	195 lb (88 kg)	RS Sr	Hawaii	Wilmington, DE
F	1	Jayden Gardner	6 ft 6 in (1.98 m)	245 lb (111 kg)	Fr	Heritage	Wake Forest, NC
G	2	K. J. Davis	6 ft 5 in (1.96 m)	200 lb (91 kg)	So	I. C. Norcom	Portsmouth, VA
F	3	Seth LeDay	6 ft 7 in (2.01 m)	215 lb (98 kg)	RS Jr	Virginia Tech	The Colony, TX
G	5	Tyler Foster	6 ft 5 in (1.96 m)	190 lb (86 kg)	Fr	Mt. Zion Baptist Christian School	Baltimore, MD
G	10	Tae Hardy	6 ft 2 in (1.88 m)	190 lb (86 kg)	Fr	Miller Grove	Ellenwood, GA
F	13	Justin Whatley	6 ft 8 in (2.03 m)	240 lb (109 kg)	So	Oscar Smith	Chesapeake, VA
F	21	Samson Strickland (W)	6 ft 5 in (1.96 m)	210 lb (95 kg)	Fr	Washington Academy	Wilson, NC
G	22	Deshaun Wade	6 ft 2 in (1.88 m)	200 lb (91 kg)	Fr	The Miller School	Virginia Beach, VA
F/C	23	Rico Quinton	6 ft 9 in (2.06 m)	240 lb (109 kg)	Fr	Dyer County	Newbern, TN
G	24	John Whitley (W)	6 ft 0 in (1.83 m)	170 lb (77 kg)	Jr	Washington	Washington, D.C.
F	32	Dimitri Spasojevic	6 ft 8 in (2.03 m)	240 lb (109 kg)	So	Gimnazija Čačak	Vršac, Serbia
G	41	Addison Hill (W)	6 ft 3 in (1.91 m)	180 lb (82 kg)	Sr	South Central	Winterville, NC
G	52	Justice Obasohan (W)	6 ft 5 in (1.96 m)	220 lb (100 kg)	Sr	NC School of Science and Math	Wallace, NC
G	55	Shawn Williams	6 ft 1 in (1.85 m)	175 lb (79 kg)	RS So	Southwest Christian Academy	Maumelle, AR

Head coach

- Joe Dooley (George Washington)

Assistant coach(es)

- Steve Roccaforte (Lamar)
- Raphael Chillious (Lafayette)
- Ken Potosnak (Randolph–Macon)

Legend

- (C) Team captain
- (S) Suspended
- (I) Ineligible
- (W) Walk-on
- Injured
- Current redshirt

Roster

== Schedule and results ==
Date time, TV	Rank^{#}	Opponent^{#}	Result	Record	Site (attendance) city, state
Non-conference regular season
November 6, 2018*; 7:45 pm		Delaware State	W 81–56	1–0	Williams Arena (3,773); Greenville, NC
November 9, 2018*; 7:45 pm, ESPN3		James Madison	L 72–73	1–1	Williams Arena (3,918); Greenville, NC
November 11, 2018*; 4:00 pm, ESPN3		Lamar; Deep South Showcase	W 84-78 ^{OT}	2–1	Williams Arena (3,104); Greenville, NC
November 16, 2018*; 7:30 pm, ACCN Extra		at Georgia Tech; Deep South Showcase	L 54–79	2–2	McCamish Pavilion (4,922); Atlanta, GA
November 19, 2018*; 7:00 pm		Texas–Rio Grande Valley; Deep South Showcase	W 69–64	3–2	Williams Arena (3,144); Greenville, NC
November 21, 2018*; 7:00 pm, ESPN3		Prairie View A&M; Deep South Showcase	W 76–64	4–2	Williams Arena (2,972); Greenville, NC
November 24, 2018*; 5:00 pm, ESPN3		High Point	L 52–55	4–3	Williams Arena (3,156); Greenville, NC
November 27, 2018*; 7:00 pm		at UNC Wilmington	L 86–95	4–4	Trask Coliseum (3,971); Wilmington, NC
November 30, 2018*; 7:00 pm, ESPN3		Appalachian State	W 83–81	5–4	Williams Arena (3,552); Greenville, NC
December 2, 2018*; 4:00 pm		Maryland Eastern Shore	W 70–47	6–4	Williams Arena (2,964); Greenville, NC
December 18, 2018*; 7:30 pm, beIN		at Charlotte	L 49–55	6–5	Dale F. Halton Arena (3,640); Charlotte, NC
December 28, 2018*; 7:00 pm, ESPN3		North Carolina A&T	W 77–57	7–5	Williams Arena (4,761); Greenville, NC
AAC regular season
January 2, 2019; 8:00 pm, ESPN3		at SMU	L 54–82	7–6 (0–1)	Moody Coliseum (5,601); Dallas, TX
January 5, 2019; 1:00 pm, CBSSN		Cincinnati	W 73–71	8–6 (1–1)	Williams Arena (4,238); Greenville, NC
January 10, 2019; 9:00 pm, ESPNU		at Memphis	W 78–72	8–7 (1–2)	FedEx Forum (14,622); Memphis, TN
January 13, 2019; 4:00 pm, ESPNU		at UCF	L 65–76	8–8 (1–3)	CFE Arena (4,692); Orlando, FL
January 16, 2019; 7:00 pm, ESPN3		Temple	L 74–85	8–9 (1–4)	Williams Arena (4,551); Greenville, NC
January 23, 2019; 8:00 pm, ESPN3		at No. 17 Houston	L 50–94	8–10 (1–5)	Fertitta Center (6,297); Houston, TX
January 26, 2019; 4:00 pm, ESPNU		South Florida; Saturday Showcase	L 57–77	8–11 (1–6)	Williams Arena (4,610); Greenville, NC
January 31, 2019; 7:00 pm, ESPNU		Tulane	W 66–65	9–11 (2–6)	Williams Arena (3,616); Greenville, NC
February 3, 2019; 2:00 pm, ESPNews		at UConn	L 52–76	9–12 (2–7)	XL Center (8,873); Hartford, CT
February 6, 2019; 7:00 pm, ESPNews		Wichita State	L 49–65	9–13 (2–8)	Williams Arena (3,631); Greenville, NC
February 10, 2019; 5:30 pm, ESPN3		at South Florida	L 68–72 ^{OT}	9–14 (2–9)	Yuengling Center (5,707); Tampa, FL
February 13, 2019; 7:00 pm, ESPN3		Memphis	L 69–79	9–15 (2–10)	Williams Arena (3,411); Greenville, NC
February 17, 2019; 2:00 pm, ESPN3		Tulsa	L 73–77 ^{OT}	9–16 (2–11)	Williams Arena (4,248); Greenville, NC
February 23, 2019; 8:00 pm, ESPNU		at Tulane	W 85–81	10–16 (3–11)	Devlin Fieldhouse (1,119); New Orleans, LA
February 27, 2019; 7:00 pm, ESPN3		No. 8 Houston	L 65–99	10–17 (3–12)	Williams Arena (4,087); Greenville, NC
March 3, 2019; 4:00 pm, ESPNU		at Tulsa	L 78–91	10–18 (3–13)	Reynolds Center (3,507); Tulsa, OK
March 5, 2019; 9:00 pm, CBSSN		at Wichita State	L 55–72	10–19 (3–14)	Charles Koch Arena (10,205); Wichita, KS
March 10, 2019; 2:00 pm, ESPNU		UConn	L 73–82	10–20 (3–15)	Williams Arena (3,845); Greenville, NC
AAC tournament
March 14, 2019; 10:00 pm, ESPNU	(11)	vs. (6) Wichita State; First round	L 57–73	10–21	FedEx Forum (7,476); Memphis, TN
*Non-conference game. ^{#}Rankings from AP Poll. (#) Tournament seedings in parentheses. All times are in Eastern Time.
