= 2018–19 Temple Owls men's basketball team =

American college basketball season

2018–19 Temple Owls men's basketball

NCAA tournament, First Four
- Conference: American Athletic Conference
- Record: 23–10 (13–5 AAC)
- Head coach: Fran Dunphy (13th season)
- Assistant coaches: Chris Clark; Aaron McKie; Shawn Trice
- Home arena: Liacouras Center

2018–19 American Athletic Conference men's basketball standings
	Conf.				Overall
Team	W		L	PCT	W		L	PCT
No. 11 Houston	16	–	2	.889	33	–	4	.892
No. 22 Cincinnati †	14	–	4	.778	28	–	7	.800
Temple	13	–	5	.722	23	–	10	.697
UCF	13	–	5	.722	24	–	9	.727
Memphis	11	–	7	.611	22	–	14	.611
Wichita State	10	–	8	.556	22	–	15	.595
Tulsa	8	–	10	.444	18	–	14	.563
South Florida	8	–	10	.444	24	–	14	.632
UConn	6	–	12	.333	16	–	17	.485
SMU	6	–	12	.333	15	–	17	.469
East Carolina	3	–	15	.167	10	–	21	.323
Tulane	0	–	18	.000	4	–	27	.129
† 2019 AAC tournament winner Rankings from AP poll

The 2018–19 Temple Owls basketball team represented Temple University during the 2018–19 NCAA Division I men's basketball season. The Owls, led by head coach Fran Dunphy in his 13th and final season with the Owls, played their home games at the Liacouras Center in Philadelphia as members of the American Athletic Conference. They finished the season 23–10, 13–5 in AAC play to finish in a tie for third place. They lost in the quarterfinals of the AAC tournament to Wichita State. They received an at-large bid to the NCAA tournament, where they lost in the First Four to Belmont.

This was Fran Dunphy's final season as Temple head coach, as the school announced on April 13, 2018, that he would step down at the end of the season, with top assistant and former Owls star Aaron McKie succeeding him in 2019.

== Previous season ==
The Owls finished the 2017–18 season 17–16, 8–10 in AAC play to finish in seventh place. In the AAC tournament, they defeated Tulane before losing to Wichita State in the quarterfinals. They received a bid to the National Invitation Tournament where they lost to Penn State in the first round.

Shortly after the season, head coach Fran Dunphy announced that the 2018–19 season would be his last at Temple. Top assistant and former Owls star Aaron McKie was named as his designated successor.

== Offseason ==
=== Departures ===
Name	Number	Pos.	Height	Weight	Year	Hometown	Reason for departure
Obi Enechionyia	0	F	6'10"	220	Senior	Springfield, VA	Graduated
Josh Brown	1	G	6'3"	195	RS senior	Irvington, NJ	Graduated
Steve Leonard	25	G/F	6'6"	180	RS senior	Collegeville, PA	Graduated
Ayan Núñez de Carvalho	32	G	6'5"	200	RS Sophomore	Paraná, Argentina	Transferred

=== Incoming transfers ===
Name	Number	Pos.	Height	Weight	Year	Hometown	Previous School
Monty Scott	2	G	6'5"	185	Junior	Union, NJ	Kennesaw State
Quentin Jackson	13	G	6'3"	184	Junior	Cary, NC	Tallahassee Community College

=== 2018 recruiting class ===
College recruiting
Name	Hometown	School	Height	Weight	Commit date
Arashma Parks #65 C	Malvern, PA	The Phelps School	6 ft 8 in (2.03 m)	232 lb (105 kg)	Aug 3, 2017
Arashma Parks #65 C	Recruit ratings: Scout: Rivals: 247Sports: (66)				
Overall recruit ranking:
Note: In many cases, Scout, Rivals, 247Sports, On3, and ESPN may conflict in their listings of height and weight.; In these cases, the average was taken. ESPN grades are on a 100-point scale.; Sources: "2018 Team Ranking". Rivals.

== Roster ==
2018–19 Temple Owls men's basketball team
Players
Coaches

Pos.	#	Name	Height	Weight	Year	Previous school	Hometown
G	0	Alani Moore II	5 ft 10 in (1.78 m)	170 lb (77 kg)	Jr	Friendship Collegiate Academy	Washington, D.C.
G	1	Quinton Rose	6 ft 8 in (2.03 m)	185 lb (84 kg)	Jr	Bishop Kearney	Rochester, New York
G	2	James Scott (redshirt)	6 ft 5 in (1.96 m)	185 lb (84 kg)	Jr	St. Benedict’s Prep; Kennesaw State	Union, New Jersey
F	4	J. P. Moorman	6 ft 7 in (2.01 m)	205 lb (93 kg)	So	Greensboro Day School	Greensboro, North Carolina
G	10	Shizz Alston	6 ft 4 in (1.93 m)	180 lb (82 kg)	Sr	Haverford School	Philadelphia, Pennsylvania
G	11	Trey Lowe	6 ft 7 in (2.01 m)	165 lb (75 kg)	RS Jr	Ewing	Ewing, New Jersey
G	13	Quentin Jackson Jr.	6 ft 2 in (1.88 m)	180 lb (82 kg)	Jr	Cape Fear Christian Academy; Tallahassee CC	Cary, North Carolina
F	14	Arashma Parks	6 ft 9 in (2.06 m)	235 lb (107 kg)	Fr	Phelps School	North Royalton, Ohio
G	15	Nate Pierre-Louis	6 ft 4 in (1.93 m)	170 lb (77 kg)	So	Roselle Catholic High School	Plainfield, New Jersey
F	21	Justyn Hamilton	6 ft 10 in (2.08 m)	190 lb (86 kg)	So	Independence High School	Charlotte, North Carolina
F	22	De'Vondre Perry	6 ft 7 in (2.01 m)	220 lb (100 kg)	So	Baltimore Polytechnic	Baltimore, Maryland
C	23	Damien Moore	6 ft 11 in (2.11 m)	225 lb (102 kg)	Jr	Callaway	Vaughn, Mississippi
C	24	Ernest Aflakpui	6 ft 10 in (2.08 m)	240 lb (109 kg)	Sr	Archbishop Carroll	Accra, Ghana

Head coach

- Fran Dunphy (La Salle)

Assistant coach(es)

- Chris Clark (Temple)
- Aaron McKie (Temple)
- Shawn Trice (Penn)

Legend

- (C) Team captain
- (S) Suspended
- (I) Ineligible
- (W) Walk-on
- Injured
- Current redshirt

Roster

== Schedule and results ==
Date time, TV	Rank^{#}	Opponent^{#}	Result	Record	Site (attendance) city, state
Regular season
November 6, 2018*; 7:30 pm, ESPN3		La Salle	W 75–67	1–0	Liacouras Center (6,011); Philadelphia, PA
November 9, 2018*; 7:00 pm, ESPN3		Detroit Mercy; Legends Classic campus-site game	W 83–67	2–0	Liacouras Center (4,649); Philadelphia, PA
November 13, 2018*; 7:00 pm, ESPN3		Georgia	W 81–77	3–0	Liacouras Center (4,613); Philadelphia, PA
November 16, 2018*; 7:00 pm, OwlsTV		Loyola (MD); Legends Classic campus-site game	W 81–67	4–0	Liacouras Center (4,815); Philadelphia, PA
November 19, 2018*; 9:30 pm, ESPN3		vs. VCU; Legends Classic semifinals	L 51–57	4–1	Barclays Center (5,967); Brooklyn, NY
November 20, 2018*; 5:00 pm, ESPNU		vs. California; Legends Classic consolation	W 76–59	5–1	Barclays Center (5,453); Brooklyn, NY
November 27, 2018*; 9:00 pm, SECN		at Missouri	W 79–77	6–1	Mizzou Arena (9,971); Columbia, MO
December 1, 2018*; 5:30 pm, NBCSN		at Saint Joseph's; Rivalry	W 77–70	7–1	Hagan Arena (4,200); Philadelphia, PA
December 5, 2018*; 8:30 pm, FS1		at No. 21 Villanova	L 59–69	7–2	Finneran Pavilion (6,501); Villanova, PA
December 12, 2018*; 7:00 pm, ESPN3		Massachusetts	W 65–63	8–2	Liacouras Center (4,840); Philadelphia, PA
December 15, 2018*; 4:30 pm, ESPN3		vs. Davidson; Boardwalk Classic	W 77–75 ^{OT}	9–2	Boardwalk Hall; Atlantic City, NJ
December 22, 2018*; 1:00 pm		at Drexel; City 6	W 82–64	10–2	Palestra (3,025); Philadelphia, PA
January 2, 2019; 7:00 pm, ESPNews		at UCF	L 73–78	10–3 (0–1)	CFE Arena (3,884); Orlando, FL
January 6, 2019; 4:00 pm, ESPNews		at Wichita State	W 85–81 ^{OT}	11–3 (1–1)	Charles Koch Arena (10,506); Wichita, KS
January 9, 2019; 7:00 pm, ESPNews		No. 17 Houston	W 73–69	12–3 (2–1)	Liacouras Center (5,723); Philadelphia, PA
January 12, 2019; 2:00 pm, ESPNU		South Florida; Saturday Showcase	W 82–80 ^{OT}	13–3 (3–1)	Liacouras Center (6,826); Philadelphia, PA
January 16, 2019; 7:00 pm, ESPN3		at East Carolina	W 85–74	14–3 (4–1)	Williams Arena (4,551); Greenville, SC
January 19, 2019*; 5:00 pm, CBSSN		Penn	L 70–77	14–4	Liacouras Center (8,409); Philadelphia, PA
January 24, 2019; 7:00 pm, CBSSN		Memphis	W 85–76	15–4 (5–1)	Liacouras Center (5,364); Philadelphia, PA
January 27, 2019; 12:00 pm, CBSSN		Cincinnati	L 68–72	15–5 (5–2)	Liacouras Center (6,652); Philadelphia, PA
January 31, 2019; 7:00 pm, ESPN2		at No. 13 Houston; Thursday Night Showcase	L 66–73	15–6 (5–3)	Fertitta Center (7,039); Houston, Texas
February 2, 2019; 6:00 pm, ESPN3		at Tulane	W 75–67	16–6 (6–3)	Devlin Fieldhouse (2,350); New Orleans, LA
February 6, 2019; 6:00 pm, CBSSN		UConn	W 81–63	17–6 (7–3)	Liacouras Center (6,129); Philadelphia, PA
February 9, 2019; 12:00 pm, ESPNU		at Tulsa	L 58–76	17–7 (7–4)	Reynolds Center (4,276); Tulsa, OK
February 13, 2019; 7:00 pm, ESPN3		SMU	W 82–74	18–7 (8–4)	Liacouras Center (4,913); Philadelphia, PA
February 16, 2019; 6:00 pm, ESPNU		at South Florida	W 70–69 ^{OT}	19–7 (9–4)	Yuengling Center (4,898); Tampa, FL
February 23, 2019; 12:00 pm, ESPNews		Tulsa	W 84–73	20–7 (10–4)	Liacouras Center (7,183); Philadelphia, PA
February 26, 2019; 8:00 pm, ESPNU		at Memphis	L 73–81	20–8 (10–5)	FedEx Forum (14,652); Memphis, TN
March 3, 2019; 2:00 pm, ESPNU		Tulane	W 80–69	21–8 (11–5)	Liacouras Center (7,090); Philadelphia, PA
March 7, 2019; 7:00 pm, CBSSN		at UConn	W 78–71	22–8 (12–5)	Harry A. Gampel Pavilion (7,790); Storrs, CT
March 9, 2019; 4:00 pm, ESPN2		No. 25 UCF; Saturday Showcase	W 67–62	23–8 (13–5)	Liacouras Center (9,951); Philadelphia, PA
AAC Tournament
March 15, 2019; 9:00 pm, ESPNU	(3)	vs. (6) Wichita State; Quarterfinals	L 74–80	23–9	FedEx Forum (7,356); Memphis, TN
NCAA tournament
March 19, 2019*; 9:10 pm, truTV	(11 E)	vs. (11 E) Belmont; First Four	L 70–81	23–10	UD Arena (11,784); Dayton, OH
*Non-conference game. ^{#}Rankings from AP Poll. (#) Tournament seedings in parentheses. E=East. All times are in Eastern Time.
