= 2018–19 UConn Huskies men's basketball team =

American college basketball season

2018–19 UConn Huskies men's basketball
- Conference: American Athletic Conference
- Record: 16–17 (6–12 AAC)
- Head coach: Dan Hurley (1st season)
- Assistant coaches: Tom Moore; Kimani Young; Kenya Hunter
- Home arena: Harry A. Gampel Pavilion; XL Center

2018–19 American Athletic Conference men's basketball standings
	Conf.				Overall
Team	W		L	PCT	W		L	PCT
No. 11 Houston	16	–	2	.889	33	–	4	.892
No. 22 Cincinnati †	14	–	4	.778	28	–	7	.800
Temple	13	–	5	.722	23	–	10	.697
UCF	13	–	5	.722	24	–	9	.727
Memphis	11	–	7	.611	22	–	14	.611
Wichita State	10	–	8	.556	22	–	15	.595
Tulsa	8	–	10	.444	18	–	14	.563
South Florida	8	–	10	.444	24	–	14	.632
UConn	6	–	12	.333	16	–	17	.485
SMU	6	–	12	.333	15	–	17	.469
East Carolina	3	–	15	.167	10	–	21	.323
Tulane	0	–	18	.000	4	–	27	.129
† 2019 AAC tournament winner Rankings from AP poll

The 2018–19 UConn Huskies men's basketball team represented the University of Connecticut in the 2018–19 NCAA Division I men's basketball season. The Huskies were led by first-year head coach Dan Hurley and participated as members of the American Athletic Conference. The Huskies split their home games between the XL Center in Hartford, Connecticut, and the Harry A. Gampel Pavilion on the UConn campus in Storrs, Connecticut. They finished the season 16–17, 6–12 in AAC play to finish in a tie for ninth place. They defeated South Florida in the first round of the AAC tournament before losing in the quarterfinals to Houston.

== Previous season ==
The Huskies finished the 2017–18 season 14–18, 7–11 in AAC play to finish in eighth place. They lost in the first round of the AAC tournament to SMU.

The school announced on January 26, 2018 that the NCAA was investigating recruitment of at least three basketball players for possible recruiting violations. On March 10, the school fired head coach Kevin Ollie for just cause related to the NCAA investigation. On March 22, 2018, it was announced that the school had hired Rhode Island head coach Dan Hurley as coach.

== Offseason ==
=== Departures ===
Name	Number	Pos.	Height	Weight	Year	Hometown	Notes
Antwoine Anderson	0	G	6'2"	170lbs	Graduate Student	Rochester, NY	Graduated
Terry Larrier	22	G/F	6'8"	185lbs	RS Junior	Bronx, NY	Declared for 2018 NBA draft
Christian Foxen	24	F	6'8"	225lbs	Senior	Rocky Hill, CT	Graduated
Michael Noyes	31	G	6'0"	190lbs	Graduate Student	Granby, CT	Graduated
David Onuorah	34	F	6'9"	249lbs	Graduate Student	Lithonia, GA	Graduated

=== Incoming transfers ===
Name	Number	Pos.	Height	Weight	Year	Hometown	Notes
Tarin Smith	2	G	6'2"	185	Graduate Student	Ocean Township, NJ	Duquesne
Kassoum Yakwe	14	F	6'7"	210	Graduate Student	Bamako, Mali	St. John's

=== 2018 recruiting class ===
College recruiting information
Name	Hometown	School	Height	Weight	Commit date
Brendan Adams; G	Baltimore, MD	Calvert Hall College HS	6 ft 4 in (1.93 m)	190 lb (86 kg)	Apr 15, 2018
Brendan Adams; G	Recruit ratings: Scout: Rivals: 247Sports: ESPN: (79)				
Akok Akok; PF	Manchester, NH	Putnam Science Academy	6 ft 10 in (2.08 m)	195 lb (88 kg)	Dec 1, 2018
Akok Akok; PF	Recruit ratings: Scout: Rivals: 247Sports: ESPN: (88)				
Overall recruit ranking: 247Sports: 114
Note: In many cases, Scout, Rivals, 247Sports, On3, and ESPN may conflict in their listings of height and weight.; In these cases, the average was taken. ESPN grades are on a 100-point scale.; Sources: "Rivals". Rivals. Archived from the original on May 30, 2018.; "ESPN". ESPN. Archived from the original on May 30, 2018.; "2018 Team Ranking". Rivals.

=== 2019 Recruiting class ===
College recruiting information
Name	Hometown	School	Height	Weight	Commit date
James Bouknight; SG	Brooklyn, NY	MacDuffie School	6 ft 4 in (1.93 m)	180 lb (82 kg)	Sep 18, 2018
James Bouknight; SG	Recruit ratings: Scout: Rivals: 247Sports: ESPN: (81)				
Jalen Gaffney; PG	West Chester, PA	Westtown School	6 ft 2 in (1.88 m)	170 lb (77 kg)	Sep 24, 2018
Jalen Gaffney; PG	Recruit ratings: Scout: Rivals: 247Sports: ESPN: (81)				
Overall recruit ranking:
Note: In many cases, Scout, Rivals, 247Sports, On3, and ESPN may conflict in their listings of height and weight.; In these cases, the average was taken. ESPN grades are on a 100-point scale.; Sources: "2019 UConn Commits". Rivals.; "2019 Team Ranking". Rivals.

== Roster ==
2018–19 Connecticut Huskies men's basketball team
Players
Coaches

Pos.	#	Name	Height	Weight	Year	Previous school	Hometown
F	0	Eric Cobb	6 ft 9 in (2.06 m)	249 lb (113 kg)	Sr	Chipola CC	Jacksonville, FL
G	1	Christian Vital	6 ft 2 in (1.88 m)	177 lb (80 kg)	Jr	St. Thomas More	Queens, NY
G	2	Tarin Smith	6 ft 2 in (1.88 m)	185 lb (84 kg)	GS	Duquesne	Ocean Township, NJ
G	3	Alterique Gilbert (injured)	6 ft 0 in (1.83 m)	180 lb (82 kg)	RS So	Miller Grove	Lithonia, GA
G	4	Jalen Adams (C)	6 ft 3 in (1.91 m)	195 lb (88 kg)	Sr	Brewster Academy	Roxbury, MA
F	5	Isaiah Whaley	6 ft 8 in (2.03 m)	210 lb (95 kg)	So	Mt. Zion Prep	Charlotte, NC
G	10	Brendan Adams	6 ft 3 in (1.91 m)	196 lb (89 kg)	Fr	Calvert Hall College	Baltimore, MD
F	12	Tyler Polley	6 ft 8 in (2.03 m)	200 lb (91 kg)	So	Sagemont	Fort Lauderdale, FL
F	14	Kassoum Yakwe (injured)	6 ft 7 in (2.01 m)	212 lb (96 kg)	GS	St. John's	Bamako, Mali
G/F	15	Sidney Wilson	6 ft 7 in (2.01 m)	177 lb (80 kg)	RS Fr	St. John's	Bronx, NY
F	21	Mamadou Diarra	6 ft 8 in (2.03 m)	225 lb (102 kg)	RS So	Putnam Science Academy	Queens, NY
F	22	Kwintin Williams (S)	6 ft 7 in (2.01 m)	221 lb (100 kg)	Jr	Arizona Western CC	Anchorage, AK
F/C	25	Josh Carlton	6 ft 9 in (2.06 m)	235 lb (107 kg)	So	DeMatha Catholic	Hyattsville, MD
G	45	Omotayo Aiyegbusi (W)	6 ft 4 in (1.93 m)	206 lb (93 kg)	Jr	Saint Joseph's	Philadelphia, PA
F	55	Daniel Brocke (W)	6 ft 7 in (2.01 m)	235 lb (107 kg)	So	Hall	West Hartford, CT

Head coach

- Dan Hurley (Seton Hall)

Assistant coach(es)

- Tom Moore (Boston University)
- Kimani Young (UTEP)
- Kenya Hunter (Duquesne)

Legend

- (C) Team captain
- (S) Suspended
- (I) Ineligible
- (W) Walk-on
- Injured
- Current redshirt

Roster
Last update: September 19, 2018

Akok Akok joined the team as a redshirt walkon for the spring semester.

== Schedule and results ==
Date time, TV	Rank^{#}	Opponent^{#}	Result	Record	High points	High rebounds	High assists	Site (attendance) city, state
Exhibition
November 2, 2018*; 7:00 pm, HuskyVision		Southern Connecticut	W 96–64		17 – B. Adams	7 – Carlton	5 – Smith	Harry A. Gampel Pavilion (5,646); Storrs, CT
Non-conference regular season
November 8, 2018*; 7:00 pm, SNY		Morehead State; 2K Sports Classic campus-site game	W 80–70	1–0	17 – Carlton	8 – Tied	4 – Tied	Harry A. Gampel Pavilion (10,167); Storrs, CT
November 11, 2018*; 5:00 pm, SNY		UMKC; 2K Sports Classic campus-site game	W 94–66	2–0	22 – Smith	10 – Vital	4 – Tied	Harry A. Gampel Pavilion (7,261); Storrs, CT
November 15, 2018*; 7:00 pm, ESPN2		vs. No. 15 Syracuse; 2K Sports Classic semifinals/rivalry	W 83–76	3–0	16 – Tied	13 – Cobb	8 – Gilbert	Madison Square Garden (14,417); New York, NY
November 16, 2018*; 7:00 pm, ESPN2		vs. Iowa; 2K Sports Classic championship	L 72–91	3–1	20 – J. Adams	7 – Cobb	4 – Gilbert	Madison Square Garden (10,909); New York, NY
November 20, 2018*; 7:00 pm, SNY		Cornell	W 91–74	4–1	21 – J. Adams	5 – Gilbert	3 – J. Adams	XL Center (7,328); Hartford, CT
November 24, 2018*; 12:00 pm, SNY		New Hampshire	W 91–66	5–1	17 – Tied	10 – Vital	4 – Vital	XL Center (8,351); Hartford, CT
November 27, 2018*; 7:00 pm, SNY		UMass Lowell	W 97–75	6–1	19 – Tied	8 – Carlton	6 – Gilbert	Harry A. Gampel Pavilion (5,507); Storrs, CT
December 2, 2018*; 1:00 pm, ESPN2		Arizona	L 72–76	6–2	21 – J. Adams	10 – Cobb	6 – J. Adams	XL Center (14,603); Hartford, CT
December 5, 2018*; 6:00 pm, ESPNU		Lafayette	W 90–63	7–2	21 – J. Adams	7 – Carlton	11 – Gilbert	XL Center (6,928); Hartford, CT
December 8, 2018*; 6:30 pm, ESPN2		vs. No. 11 Florida State; Never Forget Tribute Classic	L 71–79	7–3	24 – Gilbert	6 – Yakwe	3 – Tied	Prudential Center (7,142); Newark, NJ
December 15, 2018*; 8:00 pm, SNY		Manhattan	W 61–46	8–3	13 – Vital	8 – Vital	4 – Gilbert	Harry A. Gampel Pavilion (6,259); Storrs, CT
December 18, 2018*; 7:00 pm, SNY		Drexel	W 97–65	9–3	20 – Tied	6 – Vital	5 – Smith	XL Center (6,951); Hartford, CT
December 22, 2018*; 12:30 pm, CBS		vs. Villanova; New York Showcase	L 58–81	9–4	18 – Vital	5 – Vital	5 – J. Adams	Madison Square Garden (16,027); New York, NY
AAC regular season
January 2, 2019; 8:30 pm, CBSSN		at South Florida	L 68–76	9–5 (0–1)	25 – J. Adams	7 – Cobb	3 – Tied	Yuengling Center (3,429); Tampa, FL
January 5, 2019; 12:00 pm, ESPNews		UCF	L 53–63	9–6 (0–2)	18 – Gilbert	8 – Cobb	4 – J. Adams	XL Center (10,541); Hartford, CT
January 10, 2019; 7:00 pm, CBSSN		SMU	W 76–64	10–6 (1–2)	21 – J. Adams	7 – Tied	3 – Tied	Harry A. Gampel Pavilion (6,538); Storrs, CT
January 12, 2019; 8:00 pm, ESPN2		at Cincinnati	L 72–74 ^{OT}	10–7 (1–3)	18 – Gilbert	10 – Vital	6 – J. Adams	Fifth Third Arena (11,375); Cincinnati, OH
January 16, 2019; 7:00 pm, ESPNews		at Tulsa	L 83–89	10–8 (1–4)	27 – J. Adams	7 – Vital	4 – Smith	Reynolds Center (3,798); Tulsa, OK
January 19, 2019; 2:00 pm, CBSSN		Tulane	W 87–71	11–8 (2–4)	31 – J. Adams	8 – Tied	3 – Tied	Harry A. Gampel Pavilion (7,437); Storrs, CT
January 26, 2019; 6:00 pm, CBSSN		Wichita State	W 80–60	12–8 (3–4)	21 – Vital	12 – J. Adams	6 – Gilbert	Harry A. Gampel Pavilion (10,167); Storrs, CT
January 31, 2019; 9:00 pm, ESPNU		at UCF	L 67–73	12–9 (3–5)	27 – J. Adams	11 – Carlton	4 – Smith	CFE Arena (5,016); Orlando, FL
February 3, 2019; 2:00 pm, ESPNews		East Carolina	W 76–52	13–9 (4–5)	20 – Carlton	16 – Carlton	7 – Vital	XL Center (8,873); Hartford, CT
February 6, 2019; 6:00 pm, CBSSN		at Temple	L 63–81	13–10 (4–6)	18 – Tied	13 – Tied	5 – Vital	Liacouras Center (6,129); Philadelphia, PA
February 10, 2019; 2:00 pm, CBSSN		at Memphis	L 71–78	13–11 (4–7)	20 – Polley	11 – Cobb	6 – Vital	FedEx Forum (17,162); Memphis, TN
February 14, 2019; 7:00 pm, ESPN		No. 9 Houston	L 63–71	13–12 (4–8)	15 – Vital	10 – Carlton	7 – Smith	XL Center (10,095); Hartford, CT
February 21, 2019; 9:00 pm, ESPN2		at SMU	L 59–77	13–13 (4–9)	19 – Polley	6 – Cobb	4 – Cobb	Moody Coliseum (5,856); Dallas, TX
February 24, 2019; 2:00 pm, ESPN		Cincinnati	L 60–64	13–14 (4–10)	14 – Vital	7 – Vital	5 – Gilbert	XL Center (11,904); Hartford, CT
February 28, 2019; 7:00 pm, ESPN2		at Wichita State	L 63–65	13–15 (4–11)	18 – Gilbert	5 – Tied	5 – Smith	Charles Koch Arena (10,026); Wichita, KS
March 3, 2019; 12:00 pm, CBSSN		South Florida	W 60–58	14–15 (5–11)	16 – Carlton	9 – Carlton	3 – Carlton	Harry A. Gampel Pavilion (9,034); Storrs, CT
March 7, 2019; 7:00 pm, CBSSN		Temple	L 71–78	14–16 (5–12)	26 – Vital	7 – Tied	3 – Smith	Harry A. Gampel Pavilion (7,790); Storrs, CT
March 10, 2019; 2:00 pm, ESPNU		at East Carolina	W 82–73	15–16 (6–12)	20 – Carlton	10 – Carlton	12 – J. Adams	Williams Arena (3,845); Greenville, NC
AAC Tournament
March 14, 2019; 1:00 pm, ESPNU	(9)	vs. (8) South Florida; First round	W 80–73	16–16	25 – Vital	6 – Tied	5 – J. Adams	FedEx Forum (8,046); Memphis, TN
March 15, 2019; 12:00 pm, ESPN2	(9)	vs. (1) No. 11 Houston; Quarterfinals	L 45–84	16–17	15 – J. Adams	11 – Carlton	3 – J. Adams	FedEx Forum (7,610); Memphis, TN
*Non-conference game. ^{#}Rankings from AP Poll. (#) Tournament seedings in parentheses. All times are in Eastern Time.
