= 2018–19 SMU Mustangs men's basketball team =

American college basketball season

2018–19 SMU Mustangs men's basketball
- Conference: American Athletic Conference
- Record: 15–17 (6–12 AAC)
- Head coach: Tim Jankovich (3rd season)
- Assistant coaches: K. T. Turner; Shawn Forrest; Jay Duncan
- Home arena: Moody Coliseum

2018–19 American Athletic Conference men's basketball standings
	Conf.				Overall
Team	W		L	PCT	W		L	PCT
No. 11 Houston	16	–	2	.889	33	–	4	.892
No. 22 Cincinnati †	14	–	4	.778	28	–	7	.800
Temple	13	–	5	.722	23	–	10	.697
UCF	13	–	5	.722	24	–	9	.727
Memphis	11	–	7	.611	22	–	14	.611
Wichita State	10	–	8	.556	22	–	15	.595
Tulsa	8	–	10	.444	18	–	14	.563
South Florida	8	–	10	.444	24	–	14	.632
UConn	6	–	12	.333	16	–	17	.485
SMU	6	–	12	.333	15	–	17	.469
East Carolina	3	–	15	.167	10	–	21	.323
Tulane	0	–	18	.000	4	–	27	.129
† 2019 AAC tournament winner Rankings from AP poll

The 2018–19 SMU Mustangs men's basketball team represented Southern Methodist University during the 2018–19 NCAA Division I men's basketball season. The Mustangs were led by third-year head coach Tim Jankovich and played their home games at Moody Coliseum on their campus in University Park, Texas as members of the American Athletic Conference. They finished the season 15–17, 6–12 in AAC play to finish in a tie for ninth place. They defeated Tulsa in the first round of the AAC tournament before losing in the quarterfinals to Cincinnati.

== Previous season ==
The Mustangs finished the 2017–18 season 17–16, 6–12 in AAC play to finish in ninth place. In the AAC tournament, they defeated UConn before losing to Cincinnati in the quarterfinals.

== Offseason ==
=== Departures ===
Name	Number	Pos.	Height	Weight	Year	Hometown	Reason for departure
Shake Milton	1	G	6'6"	205	Junior	Owasso, OK	Declared for NBA draft
Elijah Landrum	20	G	6'0"	180	Freshman	Tulsa, OK	Transferred to Connors State College
Ben Emelogu	21	G	6'5"	215	RS Senior	Grand Prairie, TX	Graduated
Akoy Agau	23	F	6'8"	235	RS Senior	Omaha, NE	Transferred to Louisville

=== Incoming transfers ===
Name	Number	Pos.	Height	Weight	Year	Hometown	Previous college
Nat Dixon	5	G/F	6'4"	180	Graduate Student	Panama, FL	Chattanooga
Grant Youngkin	20	G	6'3"	190	Junior	Washington, D.C.	Rice

=== 2018 recruiting class ===
College recruiting
Name	Hometown	School	Height	Weight	Commit date
Jahmar Young Jr. C	DeSoto, TX	DeSoto High School	6 ft 9 in (2.06 m)	197 lb (89 kg)	Aug 18, 2017
Jahmar Young Jr. C	Recruit ratings: Scout: Rivals: 247Sports: (NR)				
Feron Hunt; SF	DeSoto, TX	DeSoto High School	6 ft 7 in (2.01 m)	190 lb (86 kg)	Nov 9, 2017
Feron Hunt; SF	Recruit ratings: Scout: Rivals: 247Sports: (0)				
Overall recruit ranking:
Note: In many cases, Scout, Rivals, 247Sports, On3, and ESPN may conflict in their listings of height and weight.; In these cases, the average was taken. ESPN grades are on a 100-point scale.; Sources: "2018 SMU Recruiting List". Rivals.; "2018 SMU Recruiting List". Scout.; "2018 SMU Recruiting List". ESPN.; "Scout.com Team Recruiting Rankings". Scout.; "2018 Team Ranking". Rivals.

== Roster ==
2018–19 SMU Mustangs men's basketball team
Players
Coaches

Pos.	#	Name	Height	Weight	Year	Previous school	Hometown
G	0	Jahmal McMurray	6 ft 0 in (1.83 m)	175 lb (79 kg)	Sr	South Florida	Topeka, Kansas
F	1	Feron Hunt	6 ft 8 in (2.03 m)	190 lb (86 kg)	Fr	DeSoto High School	DeSoto, Texas
G	3	William Douglas	6 ft 5 in (1.96 m)	180 lb (82 kg)	So	Christian Brothers High School	Memphis, Tennessee
G	5	Nat Dixon	6 ft 4 in (1.93 m)	180 lb (82 kg)	GS	Chattanooga	Panama City, Florida
G	10	Jarrey Foster	6 ft 6 in (1.98 m)	220 lb (100 kg)	Sr	North Shore Senior High School	Houston, Texas
G	12	James Pyle (W)	6 ft 3 in (1.91 m)	175 lb (79 kg)	Jr	St. Thomas Aquinas High School	Overland Park, Kansas
G	13	C. J. White (W)	6 ft 5 in (1.96 m)	185 lb (84 kg)	Fr	Parkview High School	Little Rock, Arkansas
F	15	Isiaha Mike	6 ft 8 in (2.03 m)	200 lb (91 kg)	RS So	Duquesne	Scarborough, Ontario
G	20	Grant Youngkin (W) (redshirt)	6 ft 3 in (1.91 m)	190 lb (86 kg)	Jr	Rice	Washington, D.C.
F	21	Jahmar Young Jr.	6 ft 9 in (2.06 m)	205 lb (93 kg)	Fr	DeSoto High School	DeSoto, Texas
G	22	Luke Wilfong (W)	6 ft 1 in (1.85 m)	170 lb (77 kg)	So	Memphis University School	Memphis, Tennessee
F	24	Everett Ray	6 ft 7 in (2.01 m)	220 lb (100 kg)	So	Trinity Christian Academy	Addison, Texas
F	25	Ethan Chargois	6 ft 9 in (2.06 m)	235 lb (107 kg)	So	Union High School	Tulsa, Oklahoma
G	31	Jimmy Whitt	6 ft 3 in (1.91 m)	175 lb (79 kg)	RS Jr	Arkansas	Columbia, Missouri

Head coach

- Tim Jankovich (Kansas State)

Assistant coach(es)

- K. T. Turner (Oklahoma City)
- Shawn Forrest (Arkansas–Pine Bluff)
- Jay Duncan (Northwood)

Legend

- (C) Team captain
- (S) Suspended
- (I) Ineligible
- (W) Walk-on
- Injured
- Current redshirt

Roster

== Schedule and results ==
Date time, TV	Rank^{#}	Opponent^{#}	Result	Record	Site (attendance) city, state
Non-conference regular season
November 8, 2018*; 7:00 pm, ESPN3		Northwestern State	W 69–58	1–0	Moody Coliseum (5,605); Dallas, TX
November 11, 2018*; 2:00 pm, ESPN3		Southern Miss; Cancún Challenge	L 64–74	1–1	Moody Coliseum (5,508); Dallas, TX
November 14, 2018*; 7:00 pm, ESPN3		Western Carolina; Cancún Challenge	W 98–65	2–1	Moody Coliseum (5,440); Dallas, TX
November 18, 2018*; 6:00 pm, ESPN3		Lipscomb	L 73–79	2–2	Moody Coliseum (5,623); Dallas, TX
November 20, 2018*; 5:00 pm, CBSSN		vs. Bradley; Cancún Challenge Riviera Division semifinals	L 62–75	2–3	Hard Rock Hotel Riviera Maya (400); Cancún, Mexico
November 21, 2018*; 5:00 pm, CBSSN		vs. Wright State; Cancún Challenge Riviera Division	W 77–76	3–3	Hard Rock Hotel Riviera Maya (400); Cancún, Mexico
November 27, 2018*; 7:00 pm, ESPN3		Lamar	W 79–65	4–3	Moody Coliseum (5,611); Dallas, TX
November 29, 2018*; 7:00 pm, ESPN3		McNeese State	W 91–59	5–3	Moody Coliseum (5,384); Dallas, TX
December 2, 2018*; 2:00 pm, ESPN3		Oral Roberts	W 79–67	6–3	Moody Coliseum (5,627); Dallas, TX
December 5, 2018*; 9:00 pm, ESPNU		TCU	L 59–67	6–4	Moody Coliseum (5,929); Dallas, TX
December 15, 2018*; 11:00 am, FS1		at Georgetown	W 81–73	7–4	Capital One Arena (6,763); Washington, D.C.
December 22, 2018*; 7:00 pm, ESPN3		Cornell	W 81–53	8–4	Moody Coliseum (6,067); Dallas, TX
AAC regular season
January 2, 2019; 7:00 pm, ESPN3		East Carolina	W 82–54	9–4 (1–0)	Moody Coliseum (5,601); Dallas, TX
January 4, 1019; 6:00 pm, ESPN2		at Tulane	W 75–65	10–4 (2–0)	Devlin Fieldhouse (1,469); New Orleans, LA
January 10, 2019; 6:00 pm, CBSSN		at UConn	L 64–76	10–5 (2–1)	Harry A. Gampel Pavilion (6,538); Storrs, CT
January 12, 2019; 5:00 pm, ESPNU		Tulsa	W 77–57	11–5 (3–1)	Moody Coliseum (6,001); Dallas, TX
January 16, 2019; 8:00 pm, ESPNews		No. 21 Houston	L 58–69	11–6 (3–2)	Moody Coliseum (6,013); Dallas, TX
January 19, 2019; 3:00 pm, ESPNU		at Memphis; Saturday Showcase	L 61–83	11–7 (3–3)	FedEx Forum (16,673); Memphis, TN
January 26, 2019; 5:00 pm, ESPNU		Tulane	W 85–75	12–7 (4–3)	Moody Coliseum (5,993); Dallas, TX
January 30, 2019; 8:00 pm, ESPNU		at Wichita State	L 83–85	12–8 (4–4)	Charles Koch Arena (10,096); Wichita, KS
February 2, 2019; 7:00 pm, CBSSN		at Cincinnati	L 68–73	12–9 (4–5)	Fifth Third Arena (12,256); Cincinnati, OH
February 7, 2019; 8:00 pm, ESPNU		South Florida	L 66–67	12–10 (4–6)	Moody Coliseum (5,677); Dallas, TX
February 10, 2019; 1:00 pm, ESPNews		UCF	L 65–71	12–11 (4–7)	Moody Coliseum (5,989); Dallas, TX
February 13, 2019; 6:00 pm, ESPN3		at Temple	L 74–82	12–12 (4–8)	Liacouras Center (4,913); Philadelphia, PA
February 21, 2019; 8:00 pm, ESPN2		UConn	W 77–59	13–12 (5–8)	Moody Coliseum (5,856); Dallas, TX
February 24, 2019; 11:00 am, CBSSN		at UCF	L 48–95	13–13 (5–9)	CFE Arena (4,978); Orlando, FL
February 27, 2019; 8:00 pm, CBSSN		No. 23 Cincinnati	L 49–52	13–14 (5–10)	Moody Coliseum (5,747); Dallas, TX
March 3, 2019; 1:00 pm, CBSSN		Wichita State	L 55–67	13–15 (5–11)	Moody Coliseum (6,185); Dallas, TX
March 7, 2019; 8:00 pm, ESPN		at No. 12 Houston	L 79–90	13–16 (5–12)	Fertitta Center (7,039); Houston, TX
March 10, 2019; 3:00 pm, ESPNU		at South Florida	W 77–71	14–16 (6–12)	Yuengling Center (3,548); Tampa, FL
AAC tournament
March 14, 2019; 7:00 pm, ESPNU	(10)	vs. (7) Tulsa; First round	W 74–65	15–16	FedEx Forum (7,476); Memphis, TN
March 15, 2019; 6:00 pm, ESPNU	(10)	vs. (2) No. 24 Cincinnati; Quarterfinals	L 74–82	15–17	FedEx Forum (7,356); Memphis, TN
*Non-conference game. ^{#}Rankings from AP Poll. (#) Tournament seedings in parentheses. All times are in Central Time.
