= 2019 American Athletic Conference men's basketball tournament =

- Classification: Division I
- Season: 2018–19
- Teams: 12
- Site: FedExForum; Memphis, Tennessee
- Champions: Cincinnati Bearcats (2nd title)
- Winning coach: Mick Cronin (2nd title)
- MVP: Jarron Cumberland (Cincinnati)
- Television: ESPN, ESPNU, ESPN2

2018–19 American Athletic Conference men's basketball standings
	Conf.				Overall
Team	W		L	PCT	W		L	PCT
No. 11 Houston	16	–	2	.889	33	–	4	.892
No. 22 Cincinnati †	14	–	4	.778	28	–	7	.800
Temple	13	–	5	.722	23	–	10	.697
UCF	13	–	5	.722	24	–	9	.727
Memphis	11	–	7	.611	22	–	14	.611
Wichita State	10	–	8	.556	22	–	15	.595
Tulsa	8	–	10	.444	18	–	14	.563
South Florida	8	–	10	.444	24	–	14	.632
UConn	6	–	12	.333	16	–	17	.485
SMU	6	–	12	.333	15	–	17	.469
East Carolina	3	–	15	.167	10	–	21	.323
Tulane	0	–	18	.000	4	–	27	.129
† 2019 AAC tournament winner Rankings from AP poll

The 2019 American Athletic Conference men's basketball tournament was the postseason men's basketball tournament for the American Athletic Conference. It was held March 14 through March 17, 2019, at the FedEx Forum in Memphis, Tennessee. Cincinnati defeated Houston 69–57 in the championship to earn the American Athletic Conference's automatic bid to the NCAA tournament. It was the second consecutive tournament championship for Cincinnati.

== Seeds ==
All 12 conference teams will participate in the conference tournament. The top four teams receive a bye into the quarterfinals. Teams are seeded by record within the conference, with a tiebreaker system to seed teams with identical conference records. Tiebreakers: win–loss record, head-to-head record, record against the highest ranked team outside of the tied teams, record against the second highest ranked team outside of the tied teams, etc.

Seed	School	Conf. record	Tiebreaker
1	Houston	16–2	
2	Cincinnati	14–4	
3	Temple	13–5	1–0 vs. Wichita State
4	UCF	13–5	0–1 vs. Wichita State
5	Memphis	11–7	
6	Wichita State	10–8	
7	Tulsa	8–10	1–0 vs. USF
8	South Florida	8–10	0–1 vs. Tulsa
9	UConn	6–12	1–1 vs. Wichita State
10	SMU	6–12	0–2 vs. Wichita State
11	East Carolina	3–15	
12	Tulane	0–18	

== Schedule ==
Game	Time	Matchup	Score	Television	Attendance
First round – Thursday, March 14
1	1:00 pm	No. 8 South Florida vs No. 9 UConn	73–80	ESPNU	8,046
2	3:00 pm	No. 5 Memphis vs No. 12 Tulane	83–68	ESPNU	8,046
3	8:00 pm	No. 7 Tulsa vs No. 10 SMU	65–74	ESPNU	7,476
4	10:00 pm	No. 6 Wichita State vs No. 11 East Carolina	73–57	ESPNU	7,476
Quarterfinals – Friday, March 15
5	12:00 pm	No. 1 Houston vs No. 9 UConn	84–45	ESPN2	7,610
6	2:00 pm	No. 4 UCF vs No. 5 Memphis	55–79	ESPN2	7,610
7	7:00 pm	No. 2 Cincinnati vs No. 10 SMU	82–74	ESPNU	7,356
8	9:00 pm	No. 3 Temple vs No. 6 Wichita State	74–80	ESPNU	7,356
Semifinals – Saturday, March 16
9	3:00 pm	No. 1 Houston vs. No. 5 Memphis	61–58	ESPN2	7,819
10	5:00 pm	No. 2 Cincinnati vs. No. 6 Wichita State	66–63	ESPN2	7,819
Championship – Sunday, March 17
11	3:15 pm	No. 1 Houston vs. No. 2 Cincinnati	57–69	ESPN	7,223
Game times in ET. Rankings denote tournament seeding.

== Bracket ==
First round Thursday, March 14
8	South Florida	73
9	UConn	80
5	Memphis	83
12	Tulane	68
7	Tulsa	65
10	SMU	74
6	Wichita State	73
11	East Carolina	57

Quarterfinals; Friday, March 15
1	Houston	84
9	UConn	45
4	UCF	55
5	Memphis	79
2	Cincinnati	82
10	SMU	74
3	Temple	74
6	Wichita State	80

Semifinals; Saturday, March 16
1	Houston	61
5	Memphis	58
2	Cincinnati	66
6	Wichita State	63

Championship; Sunday, March 17
1	Houston	57
2	Cincinnati	69
