= 2018–19 Tulane Green Wave men's basketball team =

American college basketball season

2018–19 Tulane Green Wave men's basketball
- Conference: American Athletic Conference
- Record: 4–27 (0–18 AAC)
- Head coach: Mike Dunleavy Sr. (3rd season)
- Assistant coaches: Doug Stewart; Raman Sposato; Tony Chiles
- Home arena: Devlin Fieldhouse

2018–19 American Athletic Conference men's basketball standings
	Conf.				Overall
Team	W		L	PCT	W		L	PCT
No. 11 Houston	16	–	2	.889	33	–	4	.892
No. 22 Cincinnati †	14	–	4	.778	28	–	7	.800
Temple	13	–	5	.722	23	–	10	.697
UCF	13	–	5	.722	24	–	9	.727
Memphis	11	–	7	.611	22	–	14	.611
Wichita State	10	–	8	.556	22	–	15	.595
Tulsa	8	–	10	.444	18	–	14	.563
South Florida	8	–	10	.444	24	–	14	.632
UConn	6	–	12	.333	16	–	17	.485
SMU	6	–	12	.333	15	–	17	.469
East Carolina	3	–	15	.167	10	–	21	.323
Tulane	0	–	18	.000	4	–	27	.129
† 2019 AAC tournament winner Rankings from AP poll

The 2018–19 Tulane Green Wave men's basketball team represented Tulane University during the 2018–19 NCAA Division I men's basketball season. The Green Wave, led by third-year head coach Mike Dunleavy Sr., played their home games at Devlin Fieldhouse in New Orleans, Louisiana as fifth-year members of the American Athletic Conference. They finished the season 4–27, 0–18 in AAC play to finish in 12th place. They lost in the first round of the AAC tournament to Memphis.

On March 16, 2019, Tulane announced Dunleavy would not return for the 2019–20 season. He finished 24–69 in three seasons at Tulane.

== Previous season ==
The Green Wave 14–17, 5–13 in AAC play to finish in 10th place. They lost in the first round of the AAC tournament to Temple.

== Offseason ==
=== Departures ===
Name	Number	Pos.	Height	Weight	Year	Hometown	Reason for departure
Jackson Johnson	2	G	5'10"	165	Junior	Ponte Vedera Beach, FL	Left team
Riley Conroy	4	G	5'11"	182	RS Junior	New Orleans, LA	Left team
Cameron Reynolds	5	G/F	6'8"	225	RS Senior	Pearland, TX	Graduated
Colin Slater	14	G	6'1"	187	Sophomore	Sanger, CA	Transferred to Long Beach State
Bernard Woodside	30	G	6'0"	185	Junior	Tampa, FL	Left team
Melvin Frazier	35	G	6'6"	200	Junior	Avondale, LA	Declared for the NBA draft

=== Incoming transfers ===
Name	Number	Pos.	Height	Weight	Year	Hometown	Previous School
Jordan Walker	2	G	5'11"	155	Sophomore	Port Washington, NY	Seton Hall

=== 2018 recruiting class ===
College recruiting information
Name	Hometown	School	Height	Weight	Commit date
Moses Wood; SF	Reno, Nevada	Galena High School	6 ft 6 in (1.98 m)	170 lb (77 kg)	Sep 21, 2017
Moses Wood; SF	Recruit ratings: Scout: Rivals: 247Sports: (78)				
Connor Crabtree; SG	Chatham, Virginia	Hargrave Military Academy	6 ft 6 in (1.98 m)	200 lb (91 kg)	Mar 11, 2018
Connor Crabtree; SG	Recruit ratings: Scout: Rivals: 247Sports: (N/A)				
Kevin Zhang; SF	Montverde, Florida	Montverde Academy	6 ft 8 in (2.03 m)	205 lb (93 kg)	Apr 18, 2018
Kevin Zhang; SF	Recruit ratings: Scout: Rivals: 247Sports: (N/A)				
Overall recruit ranking:
Note: In many cases, Scout, Rivals, 247Sports, On3, and ESPN may conflict in their listings of height and weight.; In these cases, the average was taken. ESPN grades are on a 100-point scale.; Sources: "2018 Team Ranking". Rivals.

== Roster ==
2018–19 Tulane Green Wave men's basketball team
Players
Coaches

Pos.	#	Name	Height	Weight	Year	Previous school	Hometown
G	0	Jordan Cornish	6 ft 6 in (1.98 m)	225 lb (102 kg)	RS Sr	Brother Martin; UNLV	New Orleans, LA
G	2	Jordan Walker (redshirt)	5 ft 11 in (1.8 m)	170 lb (77 kg)	So	The Patrick School; Seton Hall	Port Washington, NY
G	3	Ray Ona Embo (injured) (redshirt)	6 ft 5 in (1.96 m)	195 lb (88 kg)	Jr	Quality Education Academy	Lognes, France
F	4	Moses Wood	6 ft 8 in (2.03 m)	190 lb (86 kg)	Fr	Galena	Reno, NV
G	5	Connor Crabtree	6 ft 6 in (1.98 m)	190 lb (86 kg)	Fr	Hargrave Military Academy	Hillsborough, NC
G	10	Caleb Daniels	6 ft 4 in (1.93 m)	205 lb (93 kg)	So	St. Augustine	New Orleans, LA
F	11	Bul Ajang	6 ft 10 in (2.08 m)	225 lb (102 kg)	So	The Patrick School	Jonglei, South Sudan
F	12	Kevin Zhang	6 ft 9 in (2.06 m)	205 lb (93 kg)	Fr	Montverde Academy	Shenyang, China
C	13	Buay Koka	7 ft 0 in (2.13 m)	200 lb (91 kg)	RS Fr	The Patrick School	Nasir, South Sudan
G	15	Grant Quinn (W)	6 ft 5 in (1.96 m)	195 lb (88 kg)	RS So	Liberty Christian; Oklahoma	Lewisville, TX
F	21	Semir Sehic	6 ft 9 in (2.06 m)	235 lb (107 kg)	RS Jr	Cypress; Vanderbilt	Cypress, TX
F	23	Blake Paul	6 ft 9 in (2.06 m)	250 lb (113 kg)	Sr	Landry-Walker	New Orleans, LA
G	24	Shakwon Barrett	6 ft 5 in (1.96 m)	180 lb (82 kg)	RS Fr	Tech Academy	Toronto, ON
G	32	Cameron Galic (W)	6 ft 6 in (1.98 m)	205 lb (93 kg)	So	Bethesda-Chevy Chase	Bethesda, MD

Head coach

- Mike Dunleavy Sr. (South Carolina)

Assistant coach(es)

- Doug Stewart (Brown)
- Anthony Wilkins (Kent State)
- Raman Sposato (Oregon)

Legend

- (C) Team captain
- (S) Suspended
- (I) Ineligible
- (W) Walk-on
- Injured
- Current redshirt

Roster

== Schedule and results ==
Date time, TV	Rank^{#}	Opponent^{#}	Result	Record	High points	High rebounds	High assists	Site (attendance) city, state
Exhibition
November 1, 2018*; 7:00 pm		Loyola (New Orleans)	W 85–74		–	–	–	Devlin Fieldhouse; New Orleans, LA
Non-conference regular season
November 11, 2018*; 6:00 pm, ESPN3		No. 17 Florida State	L 69–80	0–1	24 – Zhang	7 – Zhang	4 – Tied	Devlin Fieldhouse (2,351); New Orleans, LA
November 13, 2018*; 7:00 pm		Coastal Carolina	W 81–76	1–1	22 – Daniels	13 – Sehic	10 – Barrett	Devlin Fieldhouse (1,241); New Orleans, LA
November 19, 2018*; 10:00 am		vs. South Dakota State; Gulf Coast Showcase Quarterfinals	W 84–80	2–1	24 – Daniels	9 – Sehic	3 – Tied	Hertz Arena (317); Estero, FL
November 20, 2018*; 4:00 pm		vs. UC Irvine; Gulf Coast Showcase Semifinals	L 55–67	2–2	14 – Daniels	7 – Tied	5 – Daniels	Hertz Arena (498); Estero, FL
November 21, 2018*; 4:00 pm		vs. Louisiana; Gulf Coast Showcase 3rd Place Game	L 61–68	2–3	20 – Cornish	7 – Tied	2 – Tied	Hertz Arena (764); Estero, FL
November 28, 2018*; 12:00 pm		Georgia State	L 76–80	2–4	23 – Zhang	8 – Sehic	8 – Cornish	Devlin Fieldhouse (1,450); New Orleans, LA
December 1, 2018*; 3:30 pm, CST		Southeastern Louisiana	L 61–62	2–5	18 – Cornish	9 – Zhang	4 – Barrett	Devlin Fieldhouse (1,743); New Orleans, LA
December 5, 2018*; 7:00 pm		UT Martin	W 87–74	3–5	26 – Barrett	11 – Sehic	3 – Tied	Devlin Fieldhouse (943); New Orleans, LA
December 8, 2018*; 3:00 pm, ESPN+		at South Alabama	L 60–81	3–6	23 – Daniels	8 – Daniels	4 – Cornish	Mitchell Center (1,565); Mobile, AL
December 17, 2018*; 7:00 pm, ESPN3		Texas Southern	W 77–70	4–6	28 – Sehic	11 – Sehic	5 – Cornish	Devlin Fieldhouse (1,050); New Orleans, LA
December 21, 2018*; 4:00 pm, FloSports		vs. Towson; Boardwalk Battle Semifinals	L 55–73	4–7	13 – Crabtree	6 – Sehic	4 – Cornish	Boardwalk Hall; Atlantic City, NJ
December 22, 2018*; 11:00 am, FloSports		vs. Alabama A&M; Boardwalk Battle 3rd Place Game	L 59–67	4–8	14 – Daniels	11 – Sehic	5 – Daniels	Boardwalk Hall; Atlantic City, NJ
AAC regular season
January 2, 2019; 5:30 pm, CBSSN		at Cincinnati	L 61–93	4–9 (0–1)	19 – Cornish	6 – Daniels	6 – Cornish	Fifth Third Arena (10,689); Cincinnati, OH
January 4, 2019; 6:00 pm, ESPN2		SMU	L 65–74	4–10 (0–2)	20 – Sehic	15 – Sehic	4 – Barrett	Devlin Fieldhouse (1,469); New Orleans, LA
January 9, 2019; 6:00 pm, ESPN3		at South Florida	L 48–66	4–11 (0–3)	14 – Sehic	12 – Sehic	5 – Cornish	Yuengling Center (3,115); Tampa, FL
January 13, 2019; 5:00 pm, ESPNU		Memphis	L 79–83	4–12 (0–4)	25 – Zhang	13 – Paul	3 – Tied	Devlin Fieldhouse (1,105); New Orleans, LA
January 19, 2019; 6:30 pm, CBSSN		at UConn	L 71–87	4–13 (0–5)	21 – Daniels	6 – Tied	6 – Cornish	Harry A. Gampel Pavilion (7,437); Storrs, CT
January 23, 2019; 7:00 pm, ESPN3		UCF	L 50–75	4–14 (0–6)	11 – Sehic	12 – Paul	4 – Cornish	Devlin Fieldhouse (1,308); New Orleans, LA
January 26, 2019; 5:00 pm, ESPNU		at SMU; Saturday Showcase	L 75–85	4–15 (0–7)	17 – Cornish	10 – Sehic	8 – Cornish	Moody Coliseum (5,993); Dallas, TX
January 31, 2019; 6:00 pm, ESPNU		at East Carolina	L 65–66	4–16 (0–8)	17 – Daniels	8 – Wood	5 – Cornish	Williams Arena (3,616); Greenville, NC
February 2, 2019; 5:00 pm, ESPN3		Temple	L 67–75	4–17 (0–9)	21 – Daniels	11 – Daniels	6 – Daniels	Devlin Fieldhouse (2,350); New Orleans, LA
February 9, 2019; 7:00 pm, ESPNU		at Wichita State	L 62–77	4–18 (0–10)	17 – Tied	8 – Cornish	5 – Cornish	Charles Koch Arena (10,435); Wichita, KS
February 14, 2019; 6:00 pm, ESPNU		Tulsa	L 57–80	4–19 (0–11)	13 – Daniels	11 – Sehic	4 – Cornish	Devlin Fieldhouse (1,250); New Orleans, LA
February 17, 2019; 1:00 pm, CBSSN		No. 9 Houston	L 50–85	4–20 (0–12)	13 – Daniels	7 – Paul	5 – Daniels	Devlin Fieldhouse (1,957); New Orleans, LA
February 20, 2019; 6:00 pm, ESPNU		at Memphis	L 76–102	4–21 (0–13)	25 – Daniels	7 – Sehic	10 – Cornish	FedEx Forum (14,747); Memphis, TN
February 23, 2019; 7:00 pm, ESPNU		East Carolina	L 81–85	4–22 (0–14)	23 – Crabtree	12 – Wood	5 – Daniels	Devlin Fieldhouse (1,119); New Orleans, LA
February 28, 2019; 8:00 pm, ESPNU		at Tulsa	L 64–72	4–23 (0–15)	20 – Daniels	10 – Daniels	4 – Wood	Reynolds Center (3,526); Tulsa, OK
March 3, 2019; 1:00 pm, ESPNU		at Temple	L 69–80	4–24 (0–16)	24 – Sehic	11 – Tied	10 – Cornish	Liacouras Center (7,090); Philadelphia, PA
March 6, 2019; 7:00 pm, ESPN3		South Florida	L 70–75	4–25 (0–17)	20 – Daniels	6 – Daniels	7 – Daniels	Devlin Fieldhouse (1,020); New Orleans, LA
March 9, 2019; 7:30 pm, CBSSN		Wichita State	L 79–82	4–26 (0–18)	36 – Daniels	8 – Sehic	4 – Cornish	Devlin Fieldhouse (1,501); New Orleans, LA
AAC tournament
March 14, 2019; 2:00 pm, ESPNU	(12)	at (5) Memphis; First round	L 68–83	4–27	19 – Daniels	7 – Daniels	7 – Barrett	FedEx Forum (8,046); Memphis, TN
*Non-conference game. ^{#}Rankings from AP Poll. (#) Tournament seedings in parentheses. All times are in Central Time.
