= Wilmington High School (Ohio) =

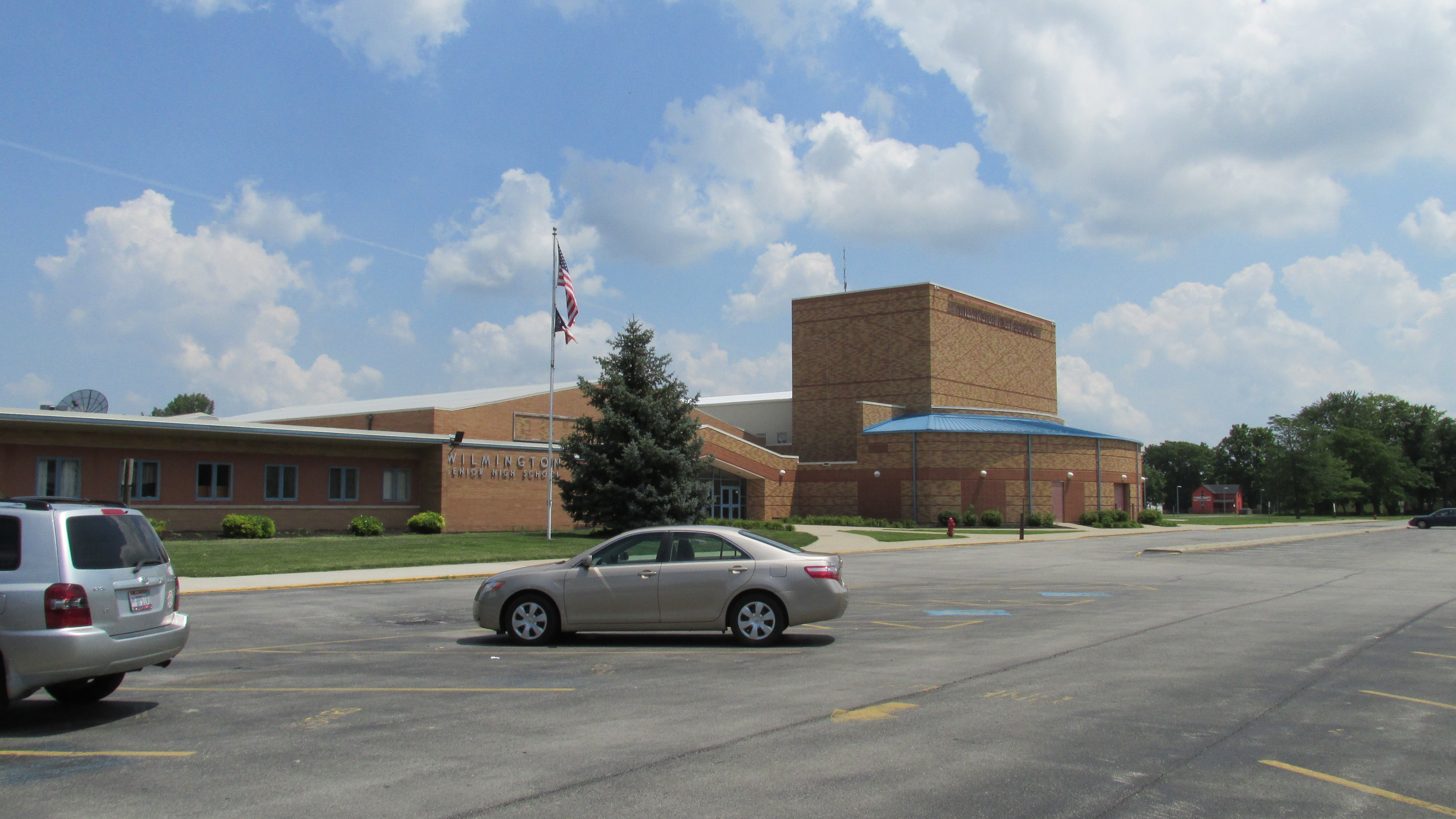

Location
- 300 Richardson Place; Wilmington, (Clinton County), Ohio 45177; United States
- Coordinates: 39°26′57″N 83°50′22″W

Information
- Type: Public, Coeducational high school
- School district: Wilmington City Schools
- Superintendent: Jim Brady
- Principal: Sam Woodruff
- Grades: 9–12
- Enrollment: 622 (2023–2024)
- Colors: Orange and Black
- Fight song: On Wilmington
- Athletics conference: Southern Ohio Athletic and Academic Conference
- Sports: Basketball, Baseball, Football, Tennis, Track, Cross Country, Swimming, Bowling, Wrestling, Golf, Volleyball, Cheerleading
- Mascot: Huffy
- Rival: Clinton-Massie
- Newspaper: The Hurricane
- Band Circuit: Ohio Music Education and Mid-States Band Association
- Website: School website

Wilmington High School is a public high school in Wilmington, Ohio. It is the only high school in the Wilmington City Schools district.

Wilmington High School has been rated excellent on the state report card for the past three years. The athletic department has had recent Ohio High School Athletic Association Division 1 individual state champions in Girls' Golf, Boys' Swimming, and Girls' Track. The Boys Basketball team were among the final four teams in the Division 1 OHSAA State basketball tournament in 2016.

In 2008, the Wilmingtones show choir—the show choir at Wilmington High School—was featured on The Rachael Ray Show. The group opened for The Fray.

Wilmington High School is home of the Wilmington Marching Band, who has received Superior ratings at the OMEA State Finals in the years 1984, 1990, 2000, 2009, 2010, 2011, 2012, 2013, and 2015. The Marching Band marched at the Magic Kingdom on New Year's Day 2014.

== Notable alumni ==
- Quinten Rollins, former NFL cornerback for the Green Bay Packers
- Mike Wilson, former NFL offensive lineman for the Cincinnati Bengals
- Jarron Cumberland, former NBA player for the Portland Trail Blazers
- Norris Turney, jazz musician and soloist with Duke Ellington & His Orchestra
