= Warner Christian Academy =

Coordinates: 29°10′45″N 81°0′24″W

Location
- 1730 S. Ridgewood Ave. South Daytona, Florida; United States

Information
- Type: Private high school
- Established: 1972
- Colors: Red, white and blue
- Mascot: Eagle
- Website: www.wcaeagles.org

Warner Christian Academy (WCA) is a private Christian school located in South Daytona, Florida. It was founded in September 1972 and is a ministry of White Chapel Church of God.

== Background ==
Warner Christian Academy opened the doors of the first grade in September 1971 and soon after added a daycare center. In September 1972, WCA opened the school year with 228 students in grades K5–9. By September 1973, Warner had 440 students, and the athletic program was started.

== Academics ==
Warner Christian Academy is accredited by the Association of Christian Schools International (ACSI). ACSI is a charter member of the National Council for Private School Accreditation (NCPSA).
