= Logan Johnson =

American basketball player (born 1999)

No. 16 – Maine Celtics
- Position: Point guard
- League: NBA G League

Personal information
- Born: October 11, 1999 (age 27) Spokane, Washington, U.S.
- Listed height: 6 ft 2 in (1.88 m)
- Listed weight: 180 lb (82 kg)

Career information
- High school: Saint Francis (Mountain View, California)
- College: Cincinnati (2018–2019); Saint Mary's (2019–2023)
- NBA draft: 2023: undrafted
- Playing career: 2023–present

Career history
- 2023–2025: Oklahoma City Blue
- 2025–2026: Fraport Skyliners
- 2026–present: Maine Celtics

Career highlights
- NBA G League champion (2024); NBA G League Slam Dunk Contest Champion (2025); First-team All-WCC (2023); 2× Second-team All-WCC (2021, 2022); WCC Defensive Player of the Year (2023)

Logan Johnson (born October 11, 1999) is an American professional basketball player for the Maine Celtics of the NBA G League. He played college basketball for the Cincinnati Bearcats and the Saint Mary's Gaels.

== High school career ==
Johnson attended Saint Francis at Mountain View, California, where he averaged 22 points, 8 rebounds, 6 assists and 3 steals as a senior, leading the Lancers to the Division I Playoffs.

== College career ==
Johnson began playing college basketball at Cincinnati, where he averaged 2.0 points, 1.2 rebounds and 0.7 assists in 32 games as a reserve. In his sophomore season, he transferred to Saint Mary's, where he averaged 10.6 points per contest and shot 44.1% from the field in 114 games (90 of them as a starter) while getting 151 steals, the fourth most in the Gaels' history. He was named WCC Defensive Player of the Year, and won the Lou Henson All-American Award.

== Professional career ==
=== Oklahoma City Blue (2023–2025) ===
After going undrafted in the 2023 NBA draft, Johnson joined the San Antonio Spurs for the 2023 NBA Summer League. On October 31, he joined the Oklahoma City Blue after being selected in the NBA G League draft. He made 26 appearances while averaging 5.6 points, 2.9 rebounds and 1.1 assists in 14.2 minutes, helping the Blue win the NBA G League title.

=== Skyliners Frankfurt (2025–2026) ===
On July 15, 2025, he signed with Skyliners Frankfurt of the Basketball Bundesliga (BBL).

== Personal life ==
The son of Jennifer and Milton Johnson, he has one sister, Lauren, and three brothers, Brandon, Tyler and Gabe. His brother Tyler is a former NBA player.
