= 2019–20 Cincinnati Bearcats men's basketball team =

American college basketball season

2019–20 Cincinnati Bearcats men's basketball

AAC regular season co-champions
- Conference: American Athletic Conference
- Record: 20–10 (13–5 American)
- Head coach: John Brannen (1st season)
- Assistant coaches: Jayson Gee (1st season); Sean Dwyer (1st season); Tim Morris (1st season)
- Home arena: Fifth Third Arena

2019–20 American Athletic Conference men's basketball standings
	Conf.				Overall
Team	W		L	PCT	W		L	PCT
Cincinnati	13	–	5	.722	20	–	10	.667
No. 22 Houston	13	–	5	.722	23	–	8	.742
Tulsa	13	–	5	.722	21	–	10	.677
Wichita State	11	–	7	.611	23	–	8	.742
UConn	10	–	8	.556	19	–	12	.613
Memphis	10	–	8	.556	21	–	10	.677
SMU	9	–	9	.500	19	–	11	.633
UCF	7	–	11	.389	16	–	14	.533
South Florida	7	–	11	.389	14	–	17	.452
Temple	6	–	12	.333	14	–	17	.452
East Carolina	5	–	13	.278	11	–	20	.355
Tulane	4	–	14	.222	12	–	18	.400
Note: The 2020 AAC tournament was canceled due to the COVID-19 pandemic. Rankings from AP poll

The 2019–20 Cincinnati Bearcats men's basketball team represented the University of Cincinnati in the 2019–20 NCAA Division I men's basketball season. The Bearcats were led by first-year head-coach John Brannen. The team played their home games at Fifth Third Arena as members of the American Athletic Conference.

== Previous season ==
The Bearcats finished the 2018–19 season 28–7, 14–4 in AAC play, finishing in second place. They defeated SMU, Wichita State, and No. 1 seed Houston to win the AAC tournament for the second consecutive year, and received the conference's automatic bid to the NCAA tournament. As the No. 7 seed in the South region, they were upset by No. 10 seed Iowa in the first round. After the conclusion of the NCAA tournament, head coach Mick Cronin accepted the head-coaching position at UCLA. John Brannen, the head coach at nearby Northern Kentucky, would be hired to replace Cronin. In the transition, UC lost G/F Rashawn Fredericks and C Nysier Brooks - both of whom would've both been seniors. They also lost sophomore guard Logan Johnson and backup PF Eliel Nsoseme. Incoming freshman and Ohio's Mr. Basketball in 2019, Samari Curtis, also de-committed. Jarron Cumberland announced he would test the waters to enter the 2019 NBA draft on April 20, 2019. On May 27, Cumberland announced he would return for his senior season.

Despite the deluge of transfers, Brannen was able to inspire a late-season recruiting renaissance, as he moved quickly to land Jeremiah Davenport, Chris Vogt, Mika Adams-Woods, Chris McNeal, Jaume Sorolla, and Jaevin Cumberland (in that order) - with the latter four commitments transpiring in under one week's time. It is worth noting that, at the time of the final scholarship being fulfilled, both Logan Johnson and Eliel Nsoseme were still in the transfer protocol and technically "could" return to UC; this series of signings effectively locked in their transfer from the program.

After all the dust settled, UC would have a final transfer enter the portal in redshirt Freshman LaQuill Hardnett. His spot would be filled shortly thereafter by the highest rated recruit of the 2019 class, Zach Harvey. Entering this season, new scholarship players would now outnumber returning players 7-6.

== Offseason ==
=== Departing players ===
Name	Number	Pos.	Height	Weight	Year	Hometown	Notes
Logan Johnson	0	G	6'2"	175	Freshman	Mountain View, California	Transferred to Saint Mary's
Justin Jenifer	3	G	5'10"	175	Senior	Baltimore, Maryland	Graduated
Rashawn Fredericks	10	G/F	6'5"	200	Junior	St. Croix, Virgin Islands	Transferred to UAB
LaQuill Hardnett	11	F	6'8"	210	RS Freshman	Philadelphia, Pennsylvania	Transferred to Buffalo
Cane Broome	15	G	6'0"	165	RS Senior	East Hartford, Connecticut	Graduated
Eliel Nsoseme	22	F/C	6'9"	225	Sophomore	Kinshasa, DR Congo	Transferred to Georgia State
Nysier Brooks	33	C	6'11"	240	Junior	Philadelphia, Pennsylvania	Transferred to Miami (FL)

=== Incoming transfers ===
Name	Pos.	Height	Weight	Year	Hometown	Notes
Chris Vogt	C	7'1"	240	Junior	Mayfield, KY	Transferred from Northern Kentucky. Vogt was granted a waiver for immediate eligibility. Will have two years of remaining eligibility.
Chris McNeal	PG	6'0"	195	Graduate Student	Jackson, TN	Transferred from Tennessee Tech after graduating. Will have one year of eligibility beginning immediately.
Jaume Sorolla	C	6'11"	240	Graduate Student	Tortosa, Spain	Transferred from Valparaiso after graduating. Will have one year of eligibility beginning immediately.
Jaevin Cumberland	SG	6'3"	185	Graduate Student	Wilmington, OH	Transferred from Oakland after graduating. Will have one year of eligibility beginning immediately. Cousin of guard Jarron Cumberland.

=== 2019 recruiting class ===
College recruiting information
Name	Hometown	School	Height	Weight	Commit date
Jeremiah Davenport; SG	Cincinnati, OH	Hargrave Military Academy	6 ft 5 in (1.96 m)	190 lb (86 kg)	May 11, 2019
Jeremiah Davenport; SG	Recruit ratings: 247Sports:				
Mika Adams-Woods; PG	Syracuse, NY	New Hampton School	6 ft 3 in (1.91 m)	175 lb (79 kg)	May 30, 2019
Mika Adams-Woods; PG	Recruit ratings: Rivals: 247Sports: (78)				
Zach Harvey; SG	Topeka, KS	Prolific Prep	6 ft 4 in (1.93 m)	170 lb (77 kg)	June 27, 2019
Zach Harvey; SG	Recruit ratings: Rivals: 247Sports: (80)				
Overall recruit ranking: 247Sports: 44
Note: In many cases, Scout, Rivals, 247Sports, On3, and ESPN may conflict in their listings of height and weight.; In these cases, the average was taken. ESPN grades are on a 100-point scale.; Sources: "Cincinnati 2019 Player Commits". ESPN.; "2019 Team Ranking". Rivals.

=== 2020 Recruiting class ===
College recruiting information (2020)
Name	Hometown	School	Height	Weight	Commit date
Mike Saunders; PG	Indianapolis, IN	Wasatch Academy	6 ft 0 in (1.83 m)	165 lb (75 kg)	June 11, 2019
Mike Saunders; PG	Recruit ratings: Rivals: 247Sports: (80)				
Gabe Madsen; SF	Rochester, MN	Mayo High School	6 ft 6 in (1.98 m)	180 lb (82 kg)	August 31, 2019
Gabe Madsen; SF	Recruit ratings: Rivals: 247Sports: (80)				
Mason Madsen; CG	Rochester, MN	Mayo High School	6 ft 3 in (1.91 m)	175 lb (79 kg)	August 31, 2019
Mason Madsen; CG	Recruit ratings: Rivals: 247Sports: (NR)				
Tari Eason; PF	Seattle, WA	Garfield High School (Seattle)	6 ft 8 in (2.03 m)	210 lb (95 kg)	December 21, 2019
Tari Eason; PF	Recruit ratings: Rivals: 247Sports: (79)				
Overall recruit ranking:
Note: In many cases, Scout, Rivals, 247Sports, On3, and ESPN may conflict in their listings of height and weight.; In these cases, the average was taken. ESPN grades are on a 100-point scale.; Sources: "Cincinnati 2020 Player Commits". ESPN.; "2020 Team Ranking". Rivals.

== Preseason ==
=== AAC media poll ===
The AAC media poll was released on October 14, 2019, with the Bearcats predicted to finish third in the AAC.

Media poll
Predicted finish	Team	Votes (1st place)
1	Houston	113 (7)
2	Memphis	113 (4)
3	Cincinnati	94 (1)
4	Wichita State	88
5	USF	79
6	UConn	75
7	Temple	72
8	SMU	47
9	UCF	40
10	Tulsa	36
11	East Carolina	20
12	Tulane	15

=== Preseason Awards ===
American Athletic Conference

- All-AAC First Team - Jarron Cumberland (* Only unanimous selection)
- AAC Player of the Year - Jarron Cumberland

Sporting News

- All-America: Second team - Jarron Cumberland

== Roster ==
2019–20 Cincinnati Bearcats men's basketball team
Players
Coaches

Pos.	#	Name	Height	Weight	Year	Previous school	Hometown
G	0	Chris McNeal	6 ft 1 in (1.85 m)	190 lb (86 kg)	GS	Tennessee Tech	Jackson, Tennessee
G	1	Jeremiah Davenport (injured)	6 ft 7 in (2.01 m)	205 lb (93 kg)	Fr	Hargrave Military Academy	Cincinnati, Ohio
G	2	Keith Williams	6 ft 5 in (1.96 m)	215 lb (98 kg)	Jr	Bishop Loughlin Memorial High School	Brooklyn, New York
G	3	Mika Adams-Woods	6 ft 3 in (1.91 m)	175 lb (79 kg)	Fr	New Hampton School	Syracuse, New York
G	5	Trevor Moore (T)	6 ft 5 in (1.96 m)	195 lb (88 kg)	Jr	South Kent Prep	Houston, Texas
F	13	Trevon Scott	6 ft 8 in (2.03 m)	225 lb (102 kg)	RS Sr	McIntosh County Academy	Darien, Georgia
F	20	Mamoudou Diarra	6 ft 9 in (2.06 m)	220 lb (100 kg)	RS So	22ft Academy	Bamako, Mali
G	21	Jaevin Cumberland	6 ft 3 in (1.91 m)	185 lb (84 kg)	GS	Oakland	Wilmington, Ohio
G	23	Zach Harvey	6 ft 5 in (1.96 m)	195 lb (88 kg)	Fr	Prolific Prep	Topeka, Kansas
F	24	Prince Toyambi (injured)	6 ft 7 in (2.01 m)	225 lb (102 kg)	RS Fr	Fresno High School	Kinshasa, DR Congo
G	31	Sam Martin (W)	5 ft 10 in (1.78 m)	170 lb (77 kg)	Jr	Summit Country Day School	Cincinnati, Ohio
G	32	John Koz (W)	6 ft 1 in (1.85 m)	200 lb (91 kg)	Sr	Bay High School	Cleveland, Ohio
C	33	Chris Vogt	7 ft 1 in (2.16 m)	260 lb (118 kg)	Jr	Northern Kentucky	Mayfield, Kentucky
C	35	Jaume Sorolla (LT)	6 ft 11 in (2.11 m)	240 lb (109 kg)	GS	Valparaiso	Tortosa, Spain
G	34	Jarron Cumberland	6 ft 5 in (1.96 m)	210 lb (95 kg)	Sr	Wilmington High School	Wilmington, Ohio
F	44	Adam Cook (W)	6 ft 6 in (1.98 m)	180 lb (82 kg)	Jr	Marysville High School	Marysville, Ohio
F	45	Rob Banks (W)	6 ft 5 in (1.96 m)	200 lb (91 kg)	Fr	Gould Academy	Bracknell, England

Head coach

- John Brannen (Marshall)

Assistant coach(es)

- Jayson Gee (Charleston (WV))
- Sean Dwyer (Michigan State)
- Tim Morris (Stanford)

Legend

- (C) Team captain
- (S) Suspended
- (I) Ineligible
- (W) Walk-on
- (T) Transferred
- (LT) Left team
- Injured
- Current redshirt

Roster
Last update: March 4, 2020

- Preseason - Prince Toyambi underwent surgery to correct a cardiac issue, leading him to sit out for the entire season.
- Dec. 9, 2019 - Trevor Moore elected to transfer to Morgan State after the fall semester.
- Feb. 4, 2020 - Jaume Sorolla left the team. He elected to return home to Spain to pursue a professional career.
- Mar. 1, 2020 - Jeremiah Davenport did not make the trip to Houston. He later underwent surgery to correct a knee injury, leading him to sit out for the rest of the season.

=== Depth chart ===
Pos.	Starting 5	Bench 1	Bench 2
C	Chris Vogt	Jaume Sorolla	Rob Banks
PF	Trevon Scott	Mamoudou Diarra	Adam Cook
SF	Keith Williams	Zach Harvey	Jeremiah Davenport
SG	Jarron Cumberland	Jaevin Cumberland	Trevor Moore
PG	Mika Adams-Woods	Chris McNeal	Sam Martin

== Schedule and results ==
The Bearcats traveled to in-state rival Ohio State to open the season for the second part of a home-and-home series with the Buckeyes. The Bearcats also began a home-and-home series with Tennessee beginning in the 2019–2020 season in Cincinnati. Tennessee visited Fifth Third Arena on December 18, 2019. The Bearcats traveled to Chicago to take on Iowa in the Chicago Legends event. Cincinnati traveled to the Virgin Islands to compete in the Paradise Jam tournament where they finished in third-place.

Date time, TV	Rank^{#}	Opponent^{#}	Result	Record	High points	High rebounds	High assists	Site (attendance) city, state
Exhibition
October 31, 2019*; 6:00pm, Bearcats TV		Thomas More	W 79–36		15 – McNeal	5 – Diarra	4 – Adams-Woods	Fifth Third Arena (5,389); Cincinnati, OH
Non-conference regular season
November 6, 2019*; 8:30pm, FS1		at No. 18 Ohio State	L 56–64	0–1	13 – Tied	12 – Scott	3 – Jar. Cumberland	Value City Arena (13,845); Columbus, OH
November 11, 2019; 7:00pm, FSOH/ESPN3		Drake	W 81–59	1–1	17 – Jae. Cumberland	11 – Scott	4 – McNeal	Fifth Third Arena (10,133); Cincinnati, OH
November 14, 2019*; 7:00pm, FSOH/ESPN3		Alabama A&M	W 85–53	2–1	18 – Vogt	10 – Vogt	6 – Jae. Cumberland	Fifth Third Arena (9,830); Cincinnati, OH
November 22, 2019*; 5:45pm, FloSports		vs. Illinois State; Paradise Jam Quarterfinals	W 66–65	3–1	23 – Jar. Cumberland	13 – Vogt	3 – Scott	Sports and Fitness Center; Saint Thomas, USVI
November 24, 2019*; 7:45pm, FloSports		vs. Bowling Green; Paradise Jam Semifinals	L 84–91 ^{OT}	3–2	21 – Jae. Cumberland	11 – Scott	4 – McNeal	Sports and Fitness Center (1,525); Saint Thomas, USVI
November 25, 2019*; 5:45pm, FloSports		vs. Valparaiso; Paradise Jam Third-place game	W 81–77 ^{OT}	4–2	21 – Vogt	11 – Scott	4 – Tied	Sports and Fitness Center; Saint Thomas, USVI
November 30, 2019*; 7:00pm, FSOH/ESPN3		UNLV	W 72–65 ^{OT}	5–2	20 – Jar. Cumberland	9 – Scott	5 – Jar. Cumberland	Fifth Third Arena (10,783); Cincinnati, OH
December 3, 2019*; 7:00pm, CBSSN		Vermont	W 82–73	6–2	23 – Williams	12 – Scott	5 – Williams	Fifth Third Arena (10,220); Cincinnati, OH
December 7, 2019*; 5:00pm, FS1		at Xavier; Crosstown Shootout	L 66–73	6–3	15 – Williams	9 – Williams	4 – Jar. Cumberland	Cintas Center (10,811); Cincinnati, OH
December 14, 2019*; 7:00pm, FSOH/ESPN3		Colgate	L 66–67	6–4	16 – Vogt	7 – Tied	4 – Jar. Cumberland	Fifth Third Arena (10,416); Cincinnati, OH
December 18, 2019*; 7:00pm, ESPN2		No. 21 Tennessee	W 78–66	7–4	15 – Scott	7 – Scott	4 – Tied	Fifth Third Arena (12,012); Cincinnati, OH
December 21, 2019*; 9:00pm, BTN		vs. Iowa; Chicago Legends	L 70–77	7–5	18 – Jar. Cumberland	8 – Vogt	4 – McNeal	United Center (6,814); Chicago, IL
AAC Regular Season
January 1, 2020; 7:00pm, CBSSN		UConn	W 67–51	8–5 (1–0)	19 – Vogt	13 – Scott	5 – Tied	Fifth Third Arena (10,833); Cincinnati, OH
January 4, 2020; 4:00pm, CBSSN		at Tulane	L 71–76	8–6 (1–1)	21 – Vogt	6 – Tied	8 – Scott	Devlin Fieldhouse (2,513); New Orleans, LA
January 8, 2020; 7:00pm, ESPNU		Tulsa	W 75–44	9–6 (2–1)	22 – Jar. Cumberland	11 – Vogt	8 – Jar. Cumberland	Fifth Third Arena (10,138); Cincinnati, OH
January 11, 2020; 12:00pm, ESPN2		at UCF	W 68–54	10–6 (3–1)	16 – Williams	11 – Scott	7 – Jar. Cumberland	Addition Financial Arena (5,482); Orlando, FL
January 16, 2020; 7:00pm, ESPN		at No. 22 Memphis; Rivalry	L 49–60	10–7 (3–2)	19 – Jar. Cumberland	8 – Williams	2 – Tied	FedEx Forum (16,079); Memphis, TN
January 19, 2020; 6:00pm, ESPNU		East Carolina	W 82–57	11–7 (4–2)	16 – Scott	11 – Tied	7 – Jar. Cumberland	Fifth Third Arena (11,103); Cincinnati, OH
January 22, 2020; 7:00pm, ESPNews		at Temple	W 89–82	12–7 (5–2)	22 – Jar. Cumberland	11 – Scott	6 – Jar. Cumberland	Liacouras Center (6,463); Philadelphia, PA
January 28, 2020; 7:00pm, ESPNews		SMU	W 65–43	13–7 (6–2)	28 – Jar. Cumberland	9 – Tied	4 – Jar. Cumberland	Fifth Third Arena (11,221); Cincinnati, OH
February 1, 2020; 6:00pm, ESPN2		No. 21 Houston	W 64–62	14–7 (7–2)	17 – Jar. Cumberland	11 – Scott	7 – Jar. Cumberland	Fifth Third Arena (12,189); Cincinnati, OH
February 6, 2020; 7:00pm, ESPN		at Wichita State	W 80–79	15–7 (8–2)	24 – Jar. Cumberland	11 – Scott	5 – Jar. Cumberland	Charles Koch Arena (10,211); Wichita, KS
February 9, 2020; 12:00pm, CBSSN		at UConn	L 71–72 ^{OT}	15–8 (8–3)	25 – Scott	13 – Scott	10 – Jar. Cumberland	Harry A. Gampel Pavilion (9,409); Storrs, CT
February 13, 2020; 7:00pm, ESPN		Memphis; Rivalry	W 92–86 ^{OT}	16–8 (9–3)	25 – Scott	19 – Scott	9 – Jar. Cumberland	Fifth Third Arena (12,239); Cincinnati, OH
February 16, 2020; 12:00pm, CBSSN		at East Carolina	W 70–67 ^{OT}	17–8 (10–3)	17 – Williams	12 – Scott	5 – Williams	Williams Arena (4,082); Greenville, NC
February 19, 2020; 7:00pm, ESPNU		UCF	L 87–89 ^{2OT}	17–9 (10–4)	22 – Scott	21 – Scott	9 – Jar. Cumberland	Fifth Third Arena (10,874); Cincinnati, OH
February 23, 2020; 1:00pm, ESPN		Wichita State	W 67–64	18–9 (11–4)	24 – Jar. Cumberland	11 – Scott	4 – Tied	Fifth Third Arena (12,137); Cincinnati, OH
March 1, 2020; 1:00pm, ESPN		at No. 25 Houston	L 55–68	18–10 (11–5)	17 – Scott	11 – Scott	4 – Jar. Cumberland	Fertitta Center (7,096); Houston, TX
March 3, 2020; 7:00pm, ESPNU		at South Florida	W 79–67	19–10 (12–5)	30 – Williams	11 – Scott	3 – Scott	Yuengling Center (3,008); Tampa, FL
March 7, 2020; 8:00pm, CBSSN		Temple	W 64–63	20–10 (13–5)	20 – Jar. Cumberland	12 – Scott	7 – Jar. Cumberland	Fifth Third Arena (12,365); Cincinnati, OH
AAC Tournament
March 13, 2020; 1:00pm, ESPN2	(1)	vs. (8) UCF / (9) South Florida; Quarterfinals	Cancelled due to the COVID-19 pandemic					Dickies Arena; Fort Worth, TX
*Non-conference game. ^{#}Rankings from AP Poll. (#) Tournament seedings in parentheses. All times are in Eastern Time.

== Rankings ==
Ranking movements Legend: ██ Increase in ranking ██ Decrease in ranking — = Not ranked RV = Received votes
	Week																				
Poll	Pre	1	2	3	4	5	6	7	8	9	10	11	12	13	14	15	16	17	18	19	Final
AP	RV	RV	—	—	RV	—	—	—	—	—	—	—	—	—	—	RV	RV	—	—		
Coaches	—	—	—	RV	RV	—	—	—	—	—	—	—	—	—	—	RV	RV	—	—		

*AP does not release post-NCAA tournament rankings

== Awards and honors ==
=== American Athletic Conference honors ===
==== All-AAC Awards ====
- Defensive Player of the Year: Trevon Scott
- Most Improved Player: Trevon Scott
- Sportsmanship Award: Trevon Scott

==== All-AAC First Team ====
- Jarron Cumberland
- Trevon Scott

==== Player of the Week ====
- Week 15: Trevon Scott

==== Weekly Honor Roll ====
- Week 4: Chris Vogt
- Week 10: Trevon Scott
- Week 11: Jarron Cumberland
- Week 12: Jarron Cumberland
- Week 13: Jarron Cumberland
- Week 14: Trevon Scott
- Week 16: Trevon Scott
- Week 18: Keith Williams
