= 2019–20 American Athletic Conference men's basketball season =

- League: NCAA Division I
- Sport: Basketball
- Duration: November 2019 through March 2020
- Teams: 12
- TV partner(s): ESPN, CBSSN, CBS

Regular Season
- Season champions: Cincinnati, Houston, Tulsa
- Season MVP: Precious Achiuwa, Memphis

Tournament

American Athletic Conference men's basketball seasons
- ← 2018–19 2020–21 →

2019–20 American Athletic Conference men's basketball standings
	Conf.				Overall
Team	W		L	PCT	W		L	PCT
Cincinnati	13	–	5	.722	20	–	10	.667
No. 22 Houston	13	–	5	.722	23	–	8	.742
Tulsa	13	–	5	.722	21	–	10	.677
Wichita State	11	–	7	.611	23	–	8	.742
UConn	10	–	8	.556	19	–	12	.613
Memphis	10	–	8	.556	21	–	10	.677
SMU	9	–	9	.500	19	–	11	.633
UCF	7	–	11	.389	16	–	14	.533
South Florida	7	–	11	.389	14	–	17	.452
Temple	6	–	12	.333	14	–	17	.452
East Carolina	5	–	13	.278	11	–	20	.355
Tulane	4	–	14	.222	12	–	18	.400
Note: The 2020 AAC tournament was canceled due to the COVID-19 pandemic. Rankings from AP poll

The 2019–20 American Athletic Conference men's basketball season began with practices in October 2019 followed by the start of the 2019–20 NCAA Division I men's basketball season in November. The conference held its media day in October 2019. Conference play began in December 2019 and concluded in March 2020.

== Head coaches ==
=== Coaching changes ===
- Cincinnati hired former Northern Kentucky coach John Brannen after coach Mick Cronin departed for the same role at UCLA.
- Tulane fired Mike Dunleavy after 3 seasons and replaced him with former Georgia State head coach Ron Hunter.
- Temple head coach Fran Dunphy retired at the end of the 2018–19 season and was succeeded by assistant coach and Temple alum Aaron McKie.

=== Coaches ===
Team	Head coach	Previous job	Years at school	Overall record	AAC record	AAC titles	NCAA Tournaments*	NCAA Final Fours	NCAA Championships
Cincinnati	John Brannen	Northern Kentucky	1	20–10	13–5	1	0	0	0
Connecticut	Dan Hurley	Rhode Island	2	35–29	16–20	0	0	0	0
East Carolina	Joe Dooley	Florida Gulf Coast	7	78–93	8–27	0	0	0	0
Houston	Kelvin Sampson	Houston Rockets (asst.)	6	138–59	71–37	2	2	0	0
Memphis	Penny Hardaway	East HS	2	43–24	21–15	0	0	0	0
SMU	Tim Jankovich	SMU (asst.)	5	90–46	38–31	1	2	0	0
South Florida	Brian Gregory	Michigan State (advisor)	3	48–53	18–36	0	0	0	0
Temple	Aaron McKie	Temple (asst.)	1	14–17	6–12	0	0	0	0
Tulane	Ron Hunter	Georgia State	1	12–18	4–14	0	0	0	0
Tulsa	Frank Haith	Missouri	6	116–76	67–41	1	1	0	0
UCF	Johnny Dawkins	Stanford	4	83–48	40–32	0	1	0	0
Wichita State	Gregg Marshall	Winthrop	13	337–119	35–19	0	7	1	0

Notes:

- Overall and AAC records are from time at current school and are through the end of 2019–20 season. NCAA records include time at current school only.
- AAC records only, prior conference records not included.
- *In current job

== Preseason ==
=== Preseason Coaches Poll ===
The AAC Coaches poll was released on October 14, 2019, with the Cougars predicted to finish first in the AAC.

Coaches poll
Predicted finish	Team	Votes (1st place)
T–1	Houston	113 (7)
T–1	Memphis	113 (4)
3	Cincinnati	94 (1)
4	Wichita State	88
5	USF	79
6	UConn	75
7	Temple	72
8	SMU	47
9	UCF	40
10	Tulsa	36
11	East Carolina	20
12	Tulane	15

=== Preseason All-AAC Teams ===
Honor	Recipient
Preseason Player of the Year	Jarron Cumberland, Cincinnati
Preseason All-AAC First Team
Preseason All-AAC First Team	Jarron Cumberland, Cincinnati
Preseason All-AAC First Team	Quinton Rose, Temple
Preseason All-AAC First Team	DeJon Jarreau, Houston
Preseason All-AAC First Team	James Wiseman, Memphis
Preseason All-AAC First Team	Laquincy Rideau, USF
Preseason All-AAC Second Team
Preseason All-AAC Second Team	Alexis Yetna, USF
Preseason All-AAC Second Team	Jayden Gardner, ECU
Preseason All-AAC Second Team	Nate Pierre-Louis, Temple
Preseason All-AAC Second Team	Alterique Gilbert, UConn
Preseason All-AAC Second Team	David Collins, USF
Preseason All-AAC Second Team	Christian Vital, UConn
Preseason Rookie of the Year	James Wiseman, Memphis

== Regular season ==
=== Rankings ===
Legend
Increase in ranking
Decrease in ranking
Not ranked previous week

		Pre	Wk 2	Wk 3	Wk 4	Wk 5	Wk 6	Wk 7	Wk 8	Wk 9	Wk 10	Wk 11	Wk 12	Wk 13	Wk 14	Wk 15	Wk 16	Wk 17	Wk 18	Wk 19	Final
Memphis	AP	14	13	16	16	15	13	11	9	9	21	22	20	RV							
Memphis	C	15	15	20	20	18	17T	13	10	11	22	22	20	RV							
Wichita State	AP							RV	RV	24	23	16	RV	23	RV						
Wichita State	C				RV	RV	RV	RV	25	23	23	16	22	22	RV						
Houston	AP	RV	RV							RV	RV	RV	25	21	25	20	22	25	21	22-T	22
Houston	C	RV	RV							RV	RV	RV	24	20	25	19	22	RV	21	24	23
Cincinnati	AP	RV			RV											RV	RV				
Cincinnati	C	RV	RV	RV	RV											RV	RV				
SMU	AP					RV								RV							
SMU	C																				
Tulsa	AP													RV	RV						
Tulsa	C													RV	RV	RV					

=== Conference matrix ===
This table summarizes the head-to-head results between teams in conference play. Each team will play 18 conference games: one game vs. four opponents and two games against seven opponents.

	Cincinnati	Connecticut	East Carolina	Houston	Memphis	SMU	South Florida	Temple	Tulane	Tulsa	UCF	Wichita State
vs. Cincinnati	–	1–1	0–2	1–1	1–1	0–1	0–1	0–2	1–0	0–1	1–1	0–2
vs. Connecticut	1–1	–	0–1	1–1	1–1	1–0	1–1	1–1	0–2	1–1	0–1	1–0
vs. East Carolina	2–0	1–0	–	1–0	1–0	1–1	1–1	1–1	0–2	2–0	2–0	1–0
vs. Houston	1–1	1–1	0–1	–	1–1	1–1	0–2	0–1	0–1	1–1	0–1	0–2
vs. Memphis	1–1	1–1	0–1	1–1	–	2–0	1–1	0–1	0–2	1–0	0–1	1–1
vs. SMU	1–0	0–1	1–1	1–1	0–2	–	1–1	1–1	1–1	1–0	1–1	1–0
vs. South Florida	1–0	1–1	1–1	2–0	1–1	1–1	–	0–1	0–1	1–0	1–1	2–0
vs. Temple	2–0	1–1	1–1	1–0	1–0	1–1	1–0	–	1–1	2–0	0–1	1–1
vs. Tulane	0–1	2–0	2–0	1–0	2–0	1–1	1–0	1–1	–	2–0	1–1	1–0
vs. Tulsa	1–0	1–1	0–2	1–1	0–1	0–1	0–1	0–2	0–2	–	1–1	1–1
vs. UCF	1–1	1–0	0–2	1–0	1–0	1–1	1–1	1–0	1–1	1–1	–	2–0
vs. Wichita State	2–0	0–1	0–1	2–0	1–1	0–1	0–2	1–1	0–1	1–1	0–2	–
Total	13–5	10–8	5–13	13–5	10–8	9–9	7–11	6–12	4–14	13–5	7–11	11–7

Note: table updated through end of 2019–20 season

=== Player of the week ===
Throughout the regular season, the American Athletic Conference named a player and rookie of the week.

Week	Player of the week	Rookie of the week	Reference
Week 1 – Nov 11	Nate Pierre-Louis – Temple	James Wiseman – Memphis	
Week 2 - Nov 18	Brandon Rachal – Tulsa	Lester Quiñones – Memphis	
Week 3 - Nov 25	Precious Achiuwa – Memphis	James Bouknight – UConn	
Week 4 - Dec 2	Quinton Rose – Temple	Boogie Ellis – Memphis	
Week 5 - Dec 9	Quentin Grimes – Houston	Tyson Etienne – Wichita State	
Week 6 - Dec 16	Erik Stevenson – Wichita State	Caleb Mills – Houston	
Week 7 - Dec 23	Jayden Gardner – East Carolina	Precious Achiuwa – Memphis	
Week 8 - Dec 30	Fabian White Jr. – Houston	Grant Sherfield – Wichita State	
Week 9 - Jan 6	Erik Stevenson (2) – Wichita State	Precious Achiuwa (2) – Memphis	
Week 10 - Jan 13	Jayden Gardner (2) – East Carolina	Precious Achiuwa (3) – Memphis	
Week 11 - Jan 20	Brandon Rachal (2) – Tulsa	D. J. Jeffries – Memphis	
Week 12 - Jan 27	Martins Igbanu – Tulsa	Caleb Mills (2) – Houston	
Week 13 - Feb 3	Elijah Joiner – Tulsa	Precious Achiuwa (4) – Memphis	
Week 14 - Feb 10	James Bouknight – UConn	Darin Green Jr. – UCF	
Week 15 - Feb 17	Trevon Scott – Cincinnati	James Bouknight (2) – UConn	
Week 16 - Feb 24	Teshaun Hightower – Tulane	Precious Achiuwa (5) – Memphis	
Week 17 - March 2	Christian Vital – UConn	Marcus Sasser – Houston	
Week 18 - March 9	Christian Vital (2) – UConn	Precious Achiuwa (6) – Memphis	

== Honors and awards ==
=== All-AAC Awards and Teams ===
Honor	Recipient
Player of the Year	Precious Achiuwa, Memphis
Coach of the Year	Frank Haith, Tulsa
Freshman of the Year	Precious Achiuwa, Memphis
Defensive Player of the Year	Trevon Scott, Cincinnati
Most Improved Player	Trevon Scott, Cincinnati
Sixth Man of the Year	Martins Igbanu, Tulsa
Sportsmanship Award	Trevon Scott, Cincinnati
All-AAC First Team
All-AAC First Team	Precious Achiuwa, Memphis*
All-AAC First Team	Jarron Cumberland, Cincinnati
All-AAC First Team	Martins Igbanu, Tulsa
All-AAC First Team	Trevon Scott, Cincinnati
All-AAC First Team	Christian Vital, UConn
All-AAC Second Team
All-AAC Second Team	Jaime Echenique, Wichita State
All-AAC Second Team	Jayden Gardner, East Carolina
All-AAC Second Team	Nate Hinton, Houston
All-AAC Second Team	Caleb Mills, Houston
All-AAC Second Team	Quinton Rose, Temple
All-AAC Third Team
All-AAC Third Team	James Bouknight, UConn
All-AAC Third Team	Kendric Davis, SMU
All-AAC Third Team	Tyson Jolly, SMU
All-AAC Third Team	Isiaha Mike, SMU
All-AAC Third Team	Brandon Rachal, Tulsa
All-Freshman Team
All-Freshman Team	Precious Achiuwa, Memphis*
All-Freshman Team	James Bouknight, UConn*
All-Freshman Team	Caleb Mills, Houston*
All-Freshman Team	Lester Quiñones, Memphis
All-Freshman Team	Marcus Sasser, Houston

* Unanimous Selection

== Postseason ==
=== American Athletic Conference tournament ===
Due to the coronavirus pandemic the tournament was cancelled on March 12, 2020 – only minutes before the first game was set to begin.

First round Thursday, March 12
8	UCF
9	South Florida
5	UConn
12	Tulane
7	SMU
10	Temple
6	Memphis
11	East Carolina

Quarterfinals; Friday, March 13
1	Cincinnati
4	Wichita State
2	#22 Houston
3	Tulsa

Semifinals; Saturday, March 14

Championship; Sunday, March 15

=== NCAA Tournament ===
On March 12, the tournament, as well as all other postseason tournaments for the remainder of the academic season, was cancelled in the wake of the coronavirus pandemic. It was the first time the tournament had been cancelled since its creation in 1939.

== NBA draft ==
The following list includes all AAC players who were drafted in the 2020 NBA draft.

Player	Position	School	Round	Pick	Team
James Wiseman	C	Memphis	1	2	Golden State Warriors
Precious Achiuwa	PF	Memphis	1	20	Miami Heat
