= 2019–20 Memphis Tigers men's basketball team =

American college basketball season

2019–20 Memphis Tigers men's basketball

Barclays Center Classic Champions
- Conference: American Athletic Conference
- Record: 21–10 (10–8 AAC)
- Head coach: Penny Hardaway (2nd season)
- Assistant coaches: Tony Madlock; Mike Miller; Cody Toppert
- Home arena: FedExForum

2019–20 American Athletic Conference men's basketball standings
	Conf.				Overall
Team	W		L	PCT	W		L	PCT
Cincinnati	13	–	5	.722	20	–	10	.667
No. 22 Houston	13	–	5	.722	23	–	8	.742
Tulsa	13	–	5	.722	21	–	10	.677
Wichita State	11	–	7	.611	23	–	8	.742
UConn	10	–	8	.556	19	–	12	.613
Memphis	10	–	8	.556	21	–	10	.677
SMU	9	–	9	.500	19	–	11	.633
UCF	7	–	11	.389	16	–	14	.533
South Florida	7	–	11	.389	14	–	17	.452
Temple	6	–	12	.333	14	–	17	.452
East Carolina	5	–	13	.278	11	–	20	.355
Tulane	4	–	14	.222	12	–	18	.400
Note: The 2020 AAC tournament was canceled due to the COVID-19 pandemic. Rankings from AP poll

The 2019–20 Memphis Tigers men's basketball team represented the University of Memphis in the 2019–20 NCAA Division I men's basketball season. This was the 99th season of Tiger basketball, the second under head coach Penny Hardaway, and the seventh as members of the American Athletic Conference. They played their home games at the FedEx Forum.

== Previous season ==
The Tigers finished the 2018–19 season 22–14, 11–7 in AAC play to finish in fifth place. They defeated Tulane and UCF in the AAC tournament before losing to Houston in the semifinals. In the 2019 NIT Tournament, they defeated San Diego in the first round before losing to Creighton in the second round.

== Offseason ==
=== Departures ===
Name	Number	Pos.	Height	Weight	Year	Hometown	Notes
Kyvon Davenport	0	F	6'8	215	Senior	Gainesville, GA	Graduated
Jeremiah Martin	3	G	6'3	185	Senior	Memphis, TN	Graduated
Raynere Thornton	4	G/F	6'6	230	Senior	Marietta, GA	Graduated
Kareem Brewton	5	G	6'2	195	Senior	Claxton, GA	Graduated
Mike Parks	10	F	6'8	250	Senior	Cleveland, OH	Graduated
Antwann Jones	11	G	6'6	205	Sophomore	Orlando, FL	Transferred to Creighton
Victor Enoh	12	F	6'7	250	Sophomore	Decatur, GA	Transferred to Marist
David Wingett	50	G/F	6'7	200	Freshman	Winnebago, NE	Transferred to South Dakota State

=== Incoming transfers ===
Name	Num	Pos.	Height	Weight	Year	Hometown	Notes
Isaiah Stokes	4	F	6'8"	270	RS Sophomore	Memphis, TN	Transferred from Florida. Under NCAA transfer rules, Stokes will have to sit out for the 2019–20 season. Will have three years of remaining eligibility.

=== 2019 recruiting class ===
College recruiting information
Name	Hometown	School	Height	Weight	Commit date
Malcolm Dandridge; C	Memphis, TN	East HS	6 ft 8 in (2.03 m)	200 lb (91 kg)	May 2, 2018
Malcolm Dandridge; C	Recruit ratings: Rivals: 247Sports: ESPN: (83)				
D. J. Jeffries; SF	Olive Branch, MS	Olive Branch HS	6 ft 7 in (2.01 m)	210 lb (95 kg)	Oct 27, 2018
D. J. Jeffries; SF	Recruit ratings: Rivals: 247Sports: ESPN: (91)				
James Wiseman; C	Nashville, TN	East HS	7 ft 0 in (2.13 m)	230 lb (100 kg)	Nov 20, 2018
James Wiseman; C	Recruit ratings: Rivals: 247Sports: ESPN: (97)				
Damion Baugh; PG	Memphis, TN	Tennessee Prep Academy	6 ft 4 in (1.93 m)	185 lb (84 kg)	Mar 7, 2019
Damion Baugh; PG	Recruit ratings: Rivals: 247Sports: ESPN: (81)				
Lester Quiñones; SG	Brentwood, NY	IMG Academy (FL)	6 ft 4 in (1.93 m)	180 lb (82 kg)	Mar 10, 2019
Lester Quiñones; SG	Recruit ratings: Rivals: 247Sports: ESPN: (84)				
Boogie Ellis; CG	San Diego, CA	Mission Bay High School	6 ft 2 in (1.88 m)	165 lb (75 kg)	May 13, 2019
Boogie Ellis; CG	Recruit ratings: Scout: Rivals: 247Sports: ESPN: (88)				
Precious Achiuwa; PF	Port Harcourt, Nigeria	Montverde Academy (FL)	6 ft 8 in (2.03 m)	210 lb (95 kg)	May 17, 2019
Precious Achiuwa; PF	Recruit ratings: Rivals: 247Sports: ESPN: (95)				
Overall recruit ranking: Rivals: #1 247Sports: #1 ESPN: #1
Note: In many cases, Scout, Rivals, 247Sports, On3, and ESPN may conflict in their listings of height and weight.; In these cases, the average was taken. ESPN grades are on a 100-point scale.; Sources: "Memphis 2019 Basketball Commitments". Rivals.; "2019 Memphis Tigers Recruiting Class". ESPN.; "2019 Team Ranking". Rivals.; "2019 Memphis Tigers Basketball 24/7 Sports Commits". 247Sports.

=== 2020 recruiting class ===
College recruiting information
Name	Hometown	School	Height	Weight	Commit date
Moussa Cissé; C	Conakry, Guinea	Lausanne Collegiate School (TN)	6 ft 11 in (2.11 m)	210 lb (95 kg)	07/15/20
Moussa Cissé; C	Recruit ratings: Rivals: 247Sports: ESPN: (92)				
Overall recruit ranking:
Note: In many cases, Scout, Rivals, 247Sports, On3, and ESPN may conflict in their listings of height and weight.; In these cases, the average was taken. ESPN grades are on a 100-point scale.; Sources: "Memphis 2020 Basketball Commitments". Rivals.; "2020 Memphis Tigers Recruiting Class". ESPN.; "2020 Team Ranking". Rivals.; "2020 Memphis Tigers Basketball 24/7 Sports Commits". 247Sports.

=== 2021 recruiting class ===
College recruiting information
Name	Hometown	School	Height	Weight	Commit date
Emoni Bates*; SF	Ypsilanti, MI	Ypsi Prep Academy	6 ft 9 in (2.06 m)	201 lb (91 kg)	08/25/21
Emoni Bates*; SF	Recruit ratings: Rivals: 247Sports: ESPN: (98)				
Jalen Duren*; C	Philadelphia, PA	Montverde Academy (FL)	6 ft 10 in (2.08 m)	230 lb (100 kg)	8/6/21
Jalen Duren*; C	Recruit ratings: Rivals: 247Sports: ESPN: (97)				
Josh Minott; SF	Boca Raton, Florida	Saint Andrew's School	6 ft 8 in (2.03 m)	175 lb (79 kg)	08/08/20
Josh Minott; SF	Recruit ratings: Rivals: 247Sports: ESPN: (84)				
Johnathan Lawson; SF	Memphis, Tennessee	Wooddale High School	6 ft 6 in (1.98 m)	165 lb (75 kg)	4/22/21
Johnathan Lawson; SF	Recruit ratings: Rivals: 247Sports: ESPN: (84)				
Sam Onu; C	Malvern, Pennsylvania	The Phelps School	6 ft 11 in (2.11 m)	235 lb (107 kg)	10/13/20
Sam Onu; C	Recruit ratings: Rivals: 247Sports: ESPN: (81)				
John Camden; SF	Wolfeboro, New Hampshire	Brewster Academy	6 ft 7 in (2.01 m)	195 lb (88 kg)	09/30/20
John Camden; SF	Recruit ratings: Rivals: 247Sports: ESPN: (79)				
Overall recruit ranking: Rivals: 1 247Sports: 1
Note: In many cases, Scout, Rivals, 247Sports, On3, and ESPN may conflict in their listings of height and weight.; In these cases, the average was taken. ESPN grades are on a 100-point scale.; Sources: "Memphis 2021 Basketball Commitments". Rivals.; "2021 Memphis Tigers Recruiting Class". ESPN.; "2021 Team Ranking". Rivals.; "2021 Memphis Tigers Basketball 24/7 Sports Commits". 247Sports.

== Roster ==
2019–20 Memphis Tigers men's basketball team
Players
Coaches

Pos.	#	Name	Height	Weight	Year	Previous school	Hometown
F	0	D. J. Jeffries	6 ft 7 in (2.01 m)	225 lb (102 kg)	Fr	Olive Branch HS	Olive Branch, Mississippi
G	1	Tyler Harris	5 ft 9 in (1.75 m)	150 lb (68 kg)	So	Cordova HS	Memphis, Tennessee
G	2	Alex Lomax	6 ft 0 in (1.83 m)	190 lb (86 kg)	So	East HS	Memphis, Tennessee
F	4	Isaiah Stokes (redshirt)	6 ft 8 in (2.03 m)	250 lb (113 kg)	RS So	Florida	Memphis, Tennessee
G	5	Boogie Ellis	6 ft 3 in (1.91 m)	175 lb (79 kg)	Fr	Mission Bay HS	San Diego, California
G	10	Damion Baugh	6 ft 3 in (1.91 m)	185 lb (84 kg)	Fr	Tennessee Prep Academy	Nashville, Tennessee
G	11	Lester Quiñones	6 ft 5 in (1.96 m)	210 lb (95 kg)	Fr	IMG Academy	Brentwood, New York
G	12	Ryan Boyce (T)	6 ft 6 in (1.98 m)	185 lb (84 kg)	RS Fr	East HS	Memphis, Tennessee
F	14	Isaiah Maurice	6 ft 10 in (2.08 m)	224 lb (102 kg)	Sr	South Plains JC	Durham, North Carolina
F	15	Lance Thomas	6 ft 9 in (2.06 m)	224 lb (102 kg)	RS So	Louisville	Norcross, Georgia
C	23	Malcolm Dandridge	6 ft 9 in (2.06 m)	250 lb (113 kg)	Fr	East HS	Memphis, Tennessee
G	25	Jayden Hardaway	6 ft 5 in (1.96 m)	195 lb (88 kg)	RS Fr	IMG Academy	Memphis, Tennessee
C	32	James Wiseman (S)	7 ft 1 in (2.16 m)	240 lb (109 kg)	Fr	East HS	Nashville, Tennessee
F	55	Precious Achiuwa	6 ft 9 in (2.06 m)	225 lb (102 kg)	Fr	Montverde Academy	Port Harcourt, Nigeria

Head coach

- Penny Hardaway (Memphis)

Assistant coach(es)

- Tony Madlock (Memphis)
- Mike Miller (Florida)
- Cody Toppert (Cornell)

Legend

- (C) Team captain
- (S) Suspended
- (I) Ineligible
- (W) Walk-on
- (T) Transferred
- Injured
- Current redshirt

Roster
Last update: September 6, 2019

- Nov 8, 2019 - James Wiseman was ruled ineligible by the NCAA. After filing and subsequently dropping a lawsuit against the NCAA, Wiseman was ruled ineligible from November 20 to January 12.
- Dec 11, 2019 - Ryan Boyce entered his name into the transfer portal. He would later transfer to Georgia State.
- Dec 19, 2019 - Wiseman left the team to focus on preparing for the 2020 NBA draft.

== Schedule and results ==
Date time, TV	Rank^{#}	Opponent^{#}	Result	Record	High points	High rebounds	High assists	Site (attendance) city, state
Exhibition
August 14, 2019*; 5:00 p.m.		vs. Commonwealth Bank Giants	W 114–83	1–0	21 – Jeffries	8 – Tied	6 – Harris	Baha Mar (–); Nassau, Bahamas
August 15, 2019*; 5:00 p.m.		vs. NPBA Select	W 135–60	2–0	22 – Jeffries	13 – Baugh	3 – Quiones	Baha Mar (-); Nassau, Bahamas
August 17, 2019*; 4:00 p.m.		vs. Bahamas Select National Team	W 87–77	3–0	19 – Harris	10 – Jeffries	6 – Baugh	Baha Mar (300); Nassau, Bahamas
August 18, 2019*; 10:00 a.m.		vs. Raw Talent Elite	W 107–77	4–0	17 – Ellis, Jeffries	12 – Jeffries	8 – Lomax	Baha Mar (–); Nassau, Bahamas
October 24, 2019*; 7:00 pm	No. 14	Christian Brothers	W 86–53	5–0	22 – Achiuwa	9 – Achiuwa	7 – Harris	FedExForum (15,403); Memphis, TN
October 28, 2019*; 7:00 pm	No. 14	LeMoyne–Owen	W 88–63	6–0	21 – Achiuwa	11 – Achiuwa	6 – Harris	FedExForum (15,363); Memphis, TN
Regular season
November 5, 2019*; 7:00 pm, ESPN3	No. 14	South Carolina State	W 97–64	1–0	28 – Wiseman	11 – Wiseman	8 – Baugh	FedEx Forum (16,002); Memphis, TN
November 8, 2019*; 6:00 pm, ESPNU	No. 14	UIC; Barclays Center Classic	W 92–46	2–0	22 – Ellis	9 – Wiseman	6 – Quinones	FedEx Forum (15,923); Memphis, TN
November 12, 2019*; 8:00 pm, ESPN	No. 13	vs. No. 14 Oregon; Phil Knight Invitational	L 74–82	2–1	16 – Quinones	12 – Wiseman	7 – Baugh	Moda Center (7,296); Portland, OR
November 16, 2019*; 1:00 pm, ESPN3	No. 13	Alcorn State; Barclays Center Classic	W 102–56	3–1	21 – Quinones	10 – Quinones	5 – Lomax	FedExForum (15,471); Memphis, TN
November 20, 2019*; 7:00 pm, ESPN3	No. 16	Little Rock; Barclays Center Classic	W 68–58	4–1	16 – Achiuwa	12 – Achiuwa	7 – Lomax	FedExForum (15,390); Memphis, TN
November 23, 2019*; 12:00 pm, ESPN3	No. 16	Ole Miss	W 87–86	5–1	25 – Achiuwa	11 – Achiuwa	7 – Lomax	FedExForum (17,875); Memphis, TN
November 28, 2019*; 3:00 pm, ESPN2	No. 16	vs. NC State; Barclays Center Classic	W 83–78	6–1	21 – Ellis	11 – Achiuwa	7 – Lomax	Barclays Center (1,778); Brooklyn, NY
December 3, 2019*; 8:00 pm, CBSSN	No. 15	Bradley	W 71–56	7–1	17 – Lomax	14 – Achiuwa	3 – Baugh	FedExForum (15,517); Memphis, TN
December 7, 2019*; 4:30 pm, CBSSN	No. 15	at UAB	W 65–57	8–1	14 – Achiuwa	11 – Achiuwa	3 – Lomax	Bartow Arena (5,041); Birmingham, AL
December 14, 2019*; 2:00 pm, ESPN	No. 13	at No. 19 Tennessee	W 51–47	9–1	11 – Harris	13 – Achiuwa	3 – Lomax	Thompson–Boling Arena (21,868); Knoxville, TN
December 21, 2019*; 12:00 pm, ESPN3	No. 11	Jackson State	W 77–49	10–1	20 – Achiuwa	9 – Achiuwa	6 – Lomax	FedExForum (15,925); Memphis, TN
December 28, 2019*; 12:30 pm, ESPN2	No. 9	New Orleans	W 97–55	11–1	18 – Achiuwa	10 – Achiuwa	7 – Baugh	FedEx Forum (15,501); Memphis, TN
December 30, 2019; 12:30 pm, CBSSN	No. 9	Tulane	W 84–73	12–1 (1–0)	16 – Quinones	10 – Achiuwa	8 – Tied	FedEx Forum (15,544); Memphis, TN
January 4, 2020*; 12:00 pm, CBS	No. 9	Georgia; American/SEC Alliance	L 62–65	12–2	20 – Achiuwa	15 – Achiuwa	4 – Lomax	FedExForum (17,272); Memphis, TN
January 9, 2020; 6:00 pm, ESPN2	No. 21	at No. 23 Wichita State	L 67–76	12–3 (1–1)	22 – Achiuwa	12 – Achiuwa	4 – Lomax	Charles Koch Arena (10,506); Wichita, KS
January 12, 2020; 3:00 pm, ESPN2	No. 21	at South Florida	W 68–64	13–3 (2–1)	22 – Achiuwa	11 – Achiuwa	7 – Lomax	Yuengling Center (5,209); Tampa, FL
January 16, 2020; 6:00 pm, ESPN	No. 22	Cincinnati; Rivalry	W 60–49	14–3 (3–1)	18 – Jeffries	11 – Achiuwa	5 – Lomax	FedEx Forum (16,079); Memphis, TN
January 22, 2020; 8:00 pm, ESPNU	No. 20	at Tulsa	L 40–80	14–4 (3–2)	10 – Achiuwa	6 – Achiuwa	3 – Jeffries	Reynolds Center (4,668); Tulsa, OK
January 25, 2020; 3:00 pm, CBSSN	No. 20	SMU	L 70–74	14–5 (3–3)	18 – Jeffries	9 – Achiuwa	5 – Tied	FedEx Forum (17,090); Memphis, TN
January 29, 2020; 6:00 pm, ESPNU		at UCF	W 59–57	15–5 (4–3)	20 – Thomas	13 – Achiuwa	4 – Quinones	Addition Financial Arena (5,774); Orlando, FL
February 1, 2020; 12:00 pm, CBS		UConn	W 70–63	16–5 (5–3)	16 – Achiuwa	8 – Achiuwa	3 – Ellis	FedEx Forum (16,240); Memphis, TN
February 5, 2020; 7:00 pm, CBSSN		Temple	W 79–65	17–5 (6–3)	21 – Quinones	10 – Achiuwa	4 – Tied	FedEx Forum (15,685); Memphis, TN
February 8, 2020; 3:00 pm, CBSSN		South Florida	L 73–75	17–6 (6–4)	17 – Harris	5 – Thomas	5 – Lomax	FedEx Forum (17,314); Memphis, TN
February 13, 2020; 6:00 pm, ESPN		at Cincinnati; Rivalry	L 86–92	17–7 (6–5)	22 – Achiuwa	17 – Achiuwa	4 – Tied	Fifth Third Arena (12,239); Cincinnati, OH
February 16, 2020; 2:00 pm, ESPN		at UConn	L 61–64	17–8 (6–6)	16 – Tied	13 – Achiuwa	4 – Lomax	XL Center (15,564); Hartford, CT
February 19, 2020; 6:00 pm, CBSSN		East Carolina	W 77–73	18–8 (7–6)	24 – Achiuwa	12 – Achiuwa	4 – Tied	FedEx Forum (16,038); Memphis, TN
February 22, 2020; 1:00 pm, ESPN2		No. 22 Houston	W 60–59	19–8 (8–6)	12 – Dandridge	6 – Tied	3 – Lomax	FedEx Forum (17,735); Memphis, TN
February 25, 2020; 8:00 pm, CBSSN		at SMU	L 53–58	19–9 (8–7)	17 – Achiuwa	7 – Achiuwa	6 – Baugh	Moody Coliseum (5,211); Dallas, TX
February 29, 2020; 7:00 pm, CBSSN		at Tulane	W 74–67 ^{OT}	20–9 (9–7)	22 – Achiuwa	22 – Achiuwa	7 – Lomax	Devlin Fieldhouse (3,023); New Orleans, LA
March 5, 2020; 8:00 pm, ESPN/ESPN2		Wichita State	W 68–60	21–9 (10–7)	19 – Harris	16 – Achiuwa	4 – Tied	FedEx Forum (17,021); Memphis, TN
March 8, 2020; 11:00 am, CBS		at No. 21 Houston	L 57–64	21–10 (10–8)	25 – Achiuwa	15 – Achiuwa	5 – Lomax	Fertitta Center (7,129); Houston, TX
AAC tournament
March 12, 2020; 9:00 pm, ESPNU	(6)	vs. (11) East Carolina; First Round	Cancelled					Dickies Arena; Fort Worth, TX
*Non-conference game. ^{#}Rankings from AP Poll. (#) Tournament seedings in parentheses. All times are in Central Time.

1. Cancelled due to the Coronavirus Pandemic

== Rankings ==
Ranking movements Legend: ██ Increase in ranking ██ Decrease in ranking — = Not ranked RV = Received votes т = Tied with team above or below
	Week																				
Poll	Pre	1	2	3	4	5	6	7	8	9	10	11	12	13	14	15	16	17	18	19	Final
AP	14	13	16	16	15	13	11	9	9	21	22	20	RV	—	—	—	—	—			Not released
Coaches	15	15	20	20	18	17-T	13	10	11	22	22	20	RV	—	—	—	—	—			

*AP does not release post-NCAA Tournament rankings

== Awards and honors ==
=== American Athletic Conference honors ===
==== All-AAC Awards ====
- Player of the Year: Precious Achiuwa
- Freshman of the Year: Precious Achiuwa

==== All-AAC First Team ====
- Precious Achiuwa

==== All Freshman Team ====
- Precious Achiuwa
- Lester Quiñones

==== Player of the Week ====
- Week 3: Precious Achiuwa

==== Rookie of the Week ====
- Week 1: James Wiseman
- Week 2: Lester Quiñones
- Week 4: Boogie Ellis
- Week 7: Precious Achiuwa
- Week 9: Precious Achiuwa
- Week 10: Precious Achiuwa
- Week 11: D. J. Jefferies
- Week 13: Precious Achiuwa
- Week 15: Precious Achiuwa
- Week 18: Precious Achiuwa
