= 2018–19 American Athletic Conference men's basketball season =

- League: NCAA Division I
- Sport: Basketball
- Duration: November 2018 through March 2019
- Teams: 12
- TV partner(s): ESPN, CBSSN, CBS

Regular Season
- Season champions: Houston
- Season MVP: Jarron Cumberland, Cincinnati

Tournament
- Champions: Cincinnati
- Runners-up: Houston

American Athletic Conference men's basketball seasons
- ← 2017–18 2019–20 →

2018–19 American Athletic Conference men's basketball standings
	Conf.				Overall
Team	W		L	PCT	W		L	PCT
No. 11 Houston	16	–	2	.889	33	–	4	.892
No. 22 Cincinnati †	14	–	4	.778	28	–	7	.800
Temple	13	–	5	.722	23	–	10	.697
UCF	13	–	5	.722	24	–	9	.727
Memphis	11	–	7	.611	22	–	14	.611
Wichita State	10	–	8	.556	22	–	15	.595
Tulsa	8	–	10	.444	18	–	14	.563
South Florida	8	–	10	.444	24	–	14	.632
UConn	6	–	12	.333	16	–	17	.485
SMU	6	–	12	.333	15	–	17	.469
East Carolina	3	–	15	.167	10	–	21	.323
Tulane	0	–	18	.000	4	–	27	.129
† 2019 AAC tournament winner Rankings from AP poll

The 2018–19 American Athletic Conference men's basketball season began with practices in October 2018 followed by the start of the 2018–19 NCAA Division I men's basketball season in November. The conference held its media day in October 2018. Conference play began in December 2018 and concluded in March 2019.

== Head coaches ==
=== Coaching changes ===
- UConn hired former Rhode Island and Wagner coach Dan Hurley after firing Kevin Ollie following his sixth season as head coach.
- Memphis fired Tubby Smith after 2 seasons and replaced him with alum Penny Hardaway.
- East Carolina head coach Jeff Lebo resigned 6 games into the 2017–18 season and was succeeded on an interim basis by assistant coach Michael Perry. After the season, the school hired former Florida Gulf Coast head coach Joe Dooley, who previously served as head coach of the team from 1995-99.

=== Coaches ===
Team	Head coach	Previous job	Years at school	Overall record	AAC record	AAC titles	NCAA Tournaments	NCAA Final Fours	NCAA Championships
Cincinnati	Mick Cronin	Murray State	13	292–144	85–20	2	8	0	0
Connecticut	Dan Hurley	Rhode Island	1	14–16	5–12	0	0	0	0
East Carolina	Joe Dooley	Florida Gulf Coast	6	68–71	3–14	0	0	0	0
Houston	Kelvin Sampson	Houston Rockets (asst.)	5	111–50	57–34	1	1	0	0
Memphis	Penny Hardaway	East HS	1	18–12	11–7	0	0	0	0
SMU	Tim Jankovich	SMU (asst.)	4	69–37	28–25	1	1	0	0
South Florida	Brian Gregory	Michigan State (advisor)	2	29–33	11–24	0	0	0	0
Temple	Fran Dunphy	Penn	13	269–160	58–49	1	7	0	0
Tulane	Mike Dunleavy	Los Angeles Clippers	3	24–67	8–45	0	0	0	0
Tulsa	Frank Haith	Missouri	5	95–64	54–35	0	1	0	0
UCF	Johnny Dawkins	Stanford	3	66–31	33–20	0	0	0	0
Wichita State	Gregg Marshall	Winthrop	11	290–101	23–12	0	7	1	0

Notes:

- Overall and AAC records are from time at current school and are through the end of 2018–19 season. NCAA records include time at current school only.
- AAC records only, prior conference records not included.

== Preseason ==
=== Preseason Coaches Poll ===
The American Coaches poll was released on October 15, 2018, with UCF predicted to finish first in the AAC.

Coaches poll
Predicted finish	Team	Votes (1st place)
1	UCF	114 (6)
2	Cincinnati	107 (3)
3	Houston	103 (2)
4	Memphis	85 (1)
5	Connecticut	75
6	Temple	74
7	SMU	63
8	Wichita State	60
9	Tulsa	48
10	Tulane	23
11	East Carolina	22
12	USF	18

=== Preseason All-AAC Teams ===
Honor	Recipient
Preseason Player of the Year	B. J. Taylor, UCF
Preseason All-AAC First Team
Preseason All-AAC First Team	Jarron Cumberland, Cincinnati
Preseason All-AAC First Team	Jalen Adams, Connecticut
Preseason All-AAC First Team	Jeremiah Martin, Memphis
Preseason All-AAC First Team	Quinton Rose, Temple
Preseason All-AAC First Team	B. J. Taylor, UCF
Preseason All-AAC Second Team
Preseason All-AAC Second Team	Corey Davis, Houston
Preseason All-AAC Second Team	Jarrey Foster, SMU
Preseason All-AAC Second Team	Markis McDuffie, Wichita State
Preseason All-AAC Second Team	Tacko Fall, UCF
Preseason All-AAC Second Team	Jahmal McMurray, SMU
Preseason All-AAC Second Team	Sterling Taplin, Tulsa
Preseason Rookie of the Year	Nate Hinton, Houston

== Regular season ==
=== Rankings ===
Legend
Increase in ranking
Decrease in ranking
Not ranked previous week

=== Conference matrix ===
This table summarizes the head-to-head results between teams in conference play. Each team will play 18 conference games: one game vs. four opponents and two games against seven opponents.

	Cincinnati	Connecticut	East Carolina	Houston	Memphis	SMU	South Florida	Temple	Tulane	Tulsa	UCF	Wichita State
vs. Cincinnati	–	0–2	1–0	2–0	0–2	0–2	0–1	0–1	0–1	0–2	1–1	0–2
vs. Connecticut	2–0	–	0–2	1–0	1–0	1–1	1–1	2–0	0–1	1–0	2–0	1–1
vs. East Carolina	0–1	2–0	–	2–0	2–0	1–0	2–0	1–0	0–2	2–0	1–0	2–0
vs. Houston	0–2	0–1	0–2	–	0–1	0–2	0–2	1–1	0–1	0–2	1–1	0–1
vs. Memphis	2–0	0–1	0–2	1–0	–	0–1	1–0	1–1	0–2	1–1	1–1	0–2
vs. SMU	2–0	1–1	0–1	2–0	1–0	–	1–1	1–0	0–2	0–1	2–0	2–0
vs. South Florida	1–0	1–1	0–2	2–0	0–1	1–1	–	2–0	0–2	1–0	2–0	0–1
vs. Temple	1–0	0–2	0–1	1–1	1–1	0–1	0–2	–	0–2	1–1	1–1	0–1
vs. Tulane	1–0	1–0	2–0	1–0	2–0	1–0	2–0	2–0	–	2–0	1–0	2–0
vs. Tulsa	2–0	0–1	0–2	2–0	1–1	2–0	0–1	1–1	0–2	–	1–0	2–0
vs. UCF	1–1	0–2	0–1	1–1	1–1	0–2	0–2	1–1	0–1	0–1	–	1–0
vs. Wichita State	2–0	1–1	0–2	1–0	2–0	0–2	1–0	1–0	0–2	0–2	0–1	–
Total	14–4	6–12	3–15	16–2	11–7	6–12	8–10	13–5	0–18	8–10	13–5	10–8

=== Player of the week ===
Throughout the regular season, the American Athletic Conference named a player and rookie of the week.

Week	Player(s) of the week	Rookie of the week
November 12, 2018	Shizz Alston, Temple Markis McDuffie, Wichita State	Jayden Gardner, ECU
November 19, 2018	Aubrey Dawkins, UCF	Tyler Harris, Memphis
November 26, 2018	Jarron Cumberland, Cincinnati	Cedrik Alley Jr.
December 3, 2018	Armoni Brooks, Houston	Jayden Gardner (2), ECU
December 10, 2018	DaQuan Jeffries, Tulsa	Tyler Harris (2), Memphis
December 17, 2018	Shizz Alston Jr. (2), Temple Galen Robinson Jr., Houston	Alexis Yetna, USF
December 24, 2018	Jarron Cumberland (2), Cincinnati	Alexis Yetna (2), USF
January 7, 2019	Aubrey Dawkins (2), UCF	Nate Hinton, Houston
January 14, 2019	Nate Pierre-Louis, Temple	Jayden Gardner (3), ECU Alexis Yetna (3), USF
January 21, 2019	Jarron Cumberland (3), Cincinnati	Jayden Gardner (4), ECU
January 28, 2019	Jarron Cumberland (4), Cincinnati	Alexis Yetna (4), USF
February 4, 2019	Markis McDuffie (2), Wichita State	Jamarius Burton, Wichita State
February 11, 2018	Corey Davis Jr., Houston	Cedrick Alley Jr., Houston
February 18, 2019	Shizz Alston Jr. (3), Temple	Jayden Gardner (5), ECU
February 25, 2019	Jeremiah Martin, Memphis	Dexter Dennis, Wichita State
March 4, 2019	Tacko Fall, UCF	Jamarius Burton (2), Wichita State
March 11, 2019	Corey Davis Jr. (2), Houston	Nate Hinton (2), Houston

== Honors and awards ==
=== All-AAC Awards and Teams ===
Honor	Recipient
Player of the Year	Jarron Cumberland, Cincinnati
Coach of the Year	Kelvin Sampson, Houston
Rookie of the Year	Alexis Yetna, USF
Defensive Player of the Year	Laquincy Rideau, USF
Most Improved Player	Josh Carlton, UConn Nate Pierre-Louis, Temple
Sixth Man of the Year	DeJon Jarreau, Houston
Sportsmanship Award	Galen Robinson, Jr., Houston
All-AAC First Team
All-AAC First Team	Jarron Cumberland, Cincinnati*
All-AAC First Team	Corey Davis Jr., Houston*
All-AAC First Team	Jeremiah Martin, Memphis*
All-AAC First Team	B. J. Taylor, UCF
All-AAC First Team	Shizz Alston, Jr., Temple
All-AAC Second Team
All-AAC Second Team	Armoni Brooks, Houston
All-AAC Second Team	Aubrey Dawkins, UCF
All-AAC Second Team	Markis McDuffie, Wichita State
All-AAC Second Team	Quinton Rose, Temple
All-AAC Second Team	Jahmal McMurray, SMU
All-AAC Third Team
All-AAC Third Team	Jalen Adams, UConn
All-AAC Third Team	David Collins, UCF
All-AAC Third Team	Tacko Fall, UCF
All-AAC Third Team	DaQuan Jeffries, Tulsa
All-AAC Third Team	Laquincy Rideau, USF
All-Rookie Team
All-Rookie Team	Jayden Gardner, ECU*
All-Rookie Team	Nate Hinton, Houston*
All-Rookie Team	Alexis Yetna, USF*
All-Rookie Team	Tyler Harris, Memphis
All-Rookie Team	Dexter Dennis, Wichita State

* Unanimous Selection

== Postseason ==
=== American Athletic Conference tournament ===
First round Thursday, March 14
8	South Florida	73
9	UConn	80
5	Memphis	83
12	Tulane	68
7	Tulsa	65
10	SMU	74
6	Wichita State	73
11	East Carolina	57

Quarterfinals; Friday, March 15
1	Houston	84
9	UConn	45
4	UCF	55
5	Memphis	79
2	Cincinnati	82
10	SMU	74
3	Temple	74
6	Wichita State	80

Semifinals; Saturday, March 16
1	Houston	61
5	Memphis	58
2	Cincinnati	66
6	Wichita State	63

Championship; Sunday, March 17
1	Houston	57
2	Cincinnati	69

=== NCAA Tournament ===
The winner of the AAC tournament, Cincinnati, received the conference's automatic bid to the NCAA Tournament.

Seed	Region	School	First Four	First round	Second round	Sweet Sixteen	Elite Eight	Final Four	Championship
3	West	Houston	N/A	defeated (14) Georgia State, 84–55	defeated (11) Ohio State, 74–59	eliminated by (2) Kentucky, 58–62			
7	South	Cincinnati	N/A	eliminated by (10) Iowa, 72–79					
9	East	UCF	N/A	defeated (8) VCU, 73–58	eliminated by (1) Duke, 76–77				
11	East	Temple	eliminated by (11) Belmont 70–81						
		W–L (%):	0–1 (.000)	2–1 (.667)	1–1 (.500)	0–1 (.000)	0–0 (–)	0–0 (–)	0–0 (–) Total: 3–4 (.429)

=== NIT ===
Memphis and Wichita State received at-large bids to the NIT.

Seed	Bracket	School	First round	Second round	Quarterfinals	Semifinals	Finals
3	TCU	Memphis	defeated (6) San Diego, 74–60	eliminated by (2) Creighton, 67-79			
6	Indiana	Wichita State	defeated (3) Furman, 76–70	defeated (2) Clemson, 63–55	defeated (1) Indiana, 73–63	eliminated by (5) Lipscomb, 64–71	
		W–L (%):	2–0 (1.000)	1–1 (.500)	1–0 (1.000)	0–1 (.000)	0–0 (–) Total: 4–2 (.667)

=== CBI ===
South Florida received an at-large bid to the CBI.

School	First round	Quarterfinals	Semifinals	Finals (Best-of-three)
South Florida	defeated Stony Brook, 82–79^{OT}	defeated Utah Valley, 66–57	defeated Loyola Marymount, 56–47	defeated DePaul, 63–61, 96-100^{OT}, 77-65
W–L (%):	1–0 (1.000)	1–0 (1.000)	1–0 (1.000)	2–1 (.667) Total: 6–1 (.857)

== NBA draft ==
No AAC players were drafted in the 2019 NBA draft.
