= 2018–19 Wichita State Shockers men's basketball team =

American college basketball season

2018–19 Wichita State Shockers men's basketball

NIT, Semifinals
- Conference: American Athletic Conference
- Record: 22–15 (10–8 AAC)
- Head coach: Gregg Marshall (12th season)
- Assistant coaches: Isaac Brown; Tyson Waterman; Lou Gudino
- Home arena: Charles Koch Arena

2018–19 American Athletic Conference men's basketball standings
	Conf.				Overall
Team	W		L	PCT	W		L	PCT
No. 11 Houston	16	–	2	.889	33	–	4	.892
No. 22 Cincinnati †	14	–	4	.778	28	–	7	.800
Temple	13	–	5	.722	23	–	10	.697
UCF	13	–	5	.722	24	–	9	.727
Memphis	11	–	7	.611	22	–	14	.611
Wichita State	10	–	8	.556	22	–	15	.595
Tulsa	8	–	10	.444	18	–	14	.563
South Florida	8	–	10	.444	24	–	14	.632
UConn	6	–	12	.333	16	–	17	.485
SMU	6	–	12	.333	15	–	17	.469
East Carolina	3	–	15	.167	10	–	21	.323
Tulane	0	–	18	.000	4	–	27	.129
† 2019 AAC tournament winner Rankings from AP poll

The 2018–19 Wichita State Shockers men's basketball team represented Wichita State University in the 2018–19 NCAA Division I men's basketball season. They played their home games at Charles Koch Arena in Wichita, Kansas and were led by 12th-year head coach Gregg Marshall as members of the American Athletic Conference. Samajae Haynes-Jones and Dexter Dennis have, in total, three notable buzzer-beaters at SMU, UConn and Tulane. This season was the first time not making the NCAA field of 68 since the 2010–11 season. They finished the season 22–15 overall, 10–8 in AAC play to finish in sixth place. As a No. 6 seed in the AAC tournament, they advanced to the semifinals, where they were defeated by Cincinnati.

With a 19–14 record, they were awarded an at-large bid to the NIT tournament. As a No. 6 seed, they were winners of the Indiana bracket when they defeated No. 3 seed Furman in the first round, No. 2 seed Clemson in the second round, and No. 1 seed Indiana in the quarterfinals. In the semifinal matchup at Madison Square Garden, they were defeated by the winners of the UNC Greensboro bracket, Lipscomb, 71–64.

== Previous season ==
The Shockers finished the 2017–18 season 25–8, 14–4 in AAC play to finish a tie for second place. As the No. 2 seed in the AAC tournament, they defeated Temple in the quarterfinals before losing to Houston in the semifinals. They received an at-large bid to the NCAA tournament for the seventh straight season. As the No. 4 seed in the East region, they were upset in the first round by Marshall.

== Offseason ==
=== Departures ===
Name	Number	Pos.	Height	Weight	Year	Hometown	Reason
Rashard Kelly	0	F	6'7"	227	Senior	Fredericksburg, VA	Graduated
Zach Brown	1	F	6'6"	216	Senior	Houston, TX	Graduated
C. J. Keyser	3	G	6'3"	194	Sophomore	Baltimore, MD	Walk-on; transferred to North Carolina Central
Kaelen Malone	10	G	6'0"	168	RS Junior	McKinney, TX	Transferred to Oral Roberts
Landry Shamet	11	G	6'4"	180	RS Sophomore	Kansas City, MO	Declared for 2018 NBA draft
Austin Reaves	12	G	6'5"	175	Sophomore	Newark, AR	Transferred to Oklahoma
Rauno Nurger	20	C	6'10"	231	Senior	Keila, Estonia	Graduated
Darral Willis Jr.	21	F	6'9"	225	Senior	Madison, WI	Graduated
Shaquille Morris	24	C	6'8"	280	RS Senior	Edmond, OK	Graduated
Brett Barney	25	F	6'9"	210	RS Sophomore	Wichita, KS	Transferred to Omaha
Conner Frankamp	33	G	6'1"	172	RS Senior	Wichita, KS	Graduated

In addition to the departing players, two of the three assistants in the 2017–18 season left during the offseason. Kyle Lindsted left after three seasons on the Shockers' staff to take the same position at Minnesota under Richard Pitino. Donnie Jones left after one season to join the Dayton staff under Anthony Grant, who had been his colleague from 1996 to 2006 as part of Billy Donovan's staff at Florida.

=== 2018 recruiting class ===
College recruiting
Name	Hometown	School	Height	Weight	Commit date
Morris Udeze; C	Montverde, FL	Montverde Academy	6 ft 8 in (2.03 m)	240 lb (110 kg)	Sep 27, 2017
Morris Udeze; C	Recruit ratings: Scout: Rivals: 247Sports: (79)				
Erik Stevenson; SG	Lacey, WA	Timberline High School	6 ft 4 in (1.93 m)	180 lb (82 kg)	Jun 20, 2017
Erik Stevenson; SG	Recruit ratings: Scout: Rivals: 247Sports: (79)				
Chance Moore; SG	Louisville, KY	Beckley Prep	6 ft 5 in (1.96 m)	180 lb (82 kg)	Nov 8, 2017
Chance Moore; SG	Recruit ratings: Scout: Rivals: 247Sports: (81)				
Isaiah Poor Bear-Chandler; C	Omaha, NE	Sunrise Christian Academy	6 ft 8 in (2.03 m)	240 lb (110 kg)	May 28, 2017
Isaiah Poor Bear-Chandler; C	Recruit ratings: Scout: Rivals: 247Sports: (79)				
Jaime Echenique; C	Athens, TX	Trinity Valley Community College	6 ft 11 in (2.11 m)	220 lb (100 kg)	Oct 5, 2017
Jaime Echenique; C	Recruit ratings: Scout: Rivals: 247Sports: (NR)				
Dexter Dennis; SG	Baker, LA	Believe Academy	6 ft 5 in (1.96 m)	200 lb (91 kg)	Apr 19, 2018
Dexter Dennis; SG	Recruit ratings: Scout: Rivals: 247Sports: (NR)				
Jamarius Burton; SG	Charlotte, NC	Independence High School	6 ft 5 in (1.96 m)	195 lb (88 kg)	Apr 21, 2018
Jamarius Burton; SG	Recruit ratings: Scout: Rivals: 247Sports: (NR)				
Ricky Torres; PG	West Plains, MO	Missouri State-West Plains	6 ft 3 in (1.91 m)	177 lb (80 kg)	Aug 5, 2018
Ricky Torres; PG	Recruit ratings: Scout: Rivals: 247Sports: (NR)				
Overall recruit ranking:
Note: In many cases, Scout, Rivals, 247Sports, On3, and ESPN may conflict in their listings of height and weight.; In these cases, the average was taken. ESPN grades are on a 100-point scale.; Sources: "2018 Team Ranking". Rivals.

=== Incoming transfers ===
Name	Num.	Pos.	Height	Weight	Year	Hometown	Previous school
Teddy Allen	23	G/F	6'5	225	Sophomore	Mesa, AZ	Transferred from West Virginia. Under NCAA transfer rules, Allen will have to sit out for the 2018–19 season. Will have three years of remaining eligibility.
Eli Farrakhan	11	G	5'11	165	Junior	Melbourne, FL	Transferred from Central Georgia Tech. Farrakhan will have two years of immediate eligibility.

== Roster ==
2018–19 Wichita State Shockers men's basketball team
Players
Coaches

Pos.	#	Name	Height	Weight	Year	Previous school	Hometown
G	0	Dexter Dennis	6 ft 5 in (1.96 m)	197 lb (89 kg)	Fr	Believe Academy	Baker, Louisiana
F	1	Markis McDuffie	6 ft 8 in (2.03 m)	196 lb (89 kg)	Sr	St. Anthony HS	Paterson, New Jersey
G	2	Jamarius Burton	6 ft 3 in (1.91 m)	204 lb (93 kg)	Fr	Independence HS	Charlotte, North Carolina
G	3	Ricky Torres	6 ft 2 in (1.88 m)	184 lb (83 kg)	Jr	Missouri State-West Plains	Pinellas Park, Florida
G	4	Samajae Haynes-Jones	6 ft 0 in (1.83 m)	169 lb (77 kg)	Sr	Hutchinson CC	Wichita, Kansas
F	5	Rod Brown	6 ft 6 in (1.98 m)	207 lb (94 kg)	RS Fr	Cordova HS	Cordova, Tennessee
G	10	Erik Stevenson	6 ft 3 in (1.91 m)	194 lb (88 kg)	Fr	Timberline HS	Lacey, Washington
G	11	Eli Farrakhan	5 ft 11 in (1.8 m)	165 lb (75 kg)	Jr	Central Georgia Tech	Melbourne, Florida
F/C	12	Morris Udeze	6 ft 8 in (2.03 m)	249 lb (113 kg)	Fr	Montverde Academy	Houston, Texas
G	14	Jacob Herrs (W)	6 ft 3 in (1.91 m)	174 lb (79 kg)	So	Andover HS	Wichita, Kansas
G	15	Brycen Bush (W)	6 ft 0 in (1.83 m)	155 lb (70 kg)	So	Eisenhower HS	Wichita, Kansas
F/C	21	Jaime Echenique	6 ft 11 in (2.11 m)	236 lb (107 kg)	So	Trinity Valley JC	Barranquilla, Colombia
F	22	Chance Moore (T)	6 ft 6 in (1.98 m)	190 lb (86 kg)	Fr	Sunrise Christian Academy	Louisville, Kentucky
G	23	Teddy Allen (redshirt)	6 ft 5 in (1.96 m)	224 lb (102 kg)	So	West Virginia	Mesa, Arizona
G	32	Tate Busse (W)	6 ft 2 in (1.88 m)	170 lb (77 kg)	Fr	St. Francis HS	St. Francis, Kansas
C	33	Asbjørn Midtgaard	7 ft 0 in (2.13 m)	268 lb (122 kg)	So	Espergarte Gymnasium	Helsingør, Denmark
F/C	44	Isaiah Poor Bear-Chandler	6 ft 9 in (2.06 m)	275 lb (125 kg)	Fr	Sunrise Christian Academy	Omaha, Nebraska

Head coach

- Gregg Marshall (Randolph–Macon)

Assistant coach(es)

- Isaac Brown (Louisiana–Monroe)
- Tyson Waterman (Winthrop)
- Lou Gudino (Incarnate Word)

Legend

- (C) Team captain
- (S) Suspended
- (I) Ineligible
- (W) Walk-on
- (T) Transferred
- Injured
- Current redshirt

Roster
Last update: July 25, 2018

- Dec. 17th, 2018 - Chance Moore elected to transfer to Washington State after the fall semester.

== Schedule and results ==
Date time, TV	Rank^{#}	Opponent^{#}	Result	Record	High points	High rebounds	High assists	Site (attendance) city, state
Exhibition
October 30, 2018*; 7:00 pm, Cox YurView		Catawba	W 75–64		19 – Haynes-Jones	5 – Tied	3 – Burton	Charles Koch Arena (9,981); Wichita, KS
Non-conference regular season
November 6, 2018*; 7:00 pm, Cox YurView		Louisiana Tech	L 58–71	0–1	16 – Stevenson	7 – Echenique	5 – Burton	Charles Koch Arena (10,267); Wichita, KS
November 9, 2018*; 5:00 pm, CBSSN		vs. Providence; Veterans Classic	W 83–80	1–1	32 – McDuffie	7 – Echenique	8 – Haynes-Jones	Alumni Hall (5,710); Annapolis, MD
November 15, 2018*; 6:00 pm, ESPN3		vs. Davidson; Charleston Classic quarterfinals	L 53–57	1–2	18 – McDuffie	8 – Stevenson	5 – Haynes-Jones	TD Arena (4,017); Charleston, SC
November 16, 2018*; 3:30 pm, ESPNU		vs. Appalachian State; Charleston Classic	W 82–76	2–2	24 – McDuffie	11 – Echenique	6 – Burton	TD Arena (4,135); Charleston, SC
November 18, 2018*; 12:30 pm, ESPNU		vs. Alabama; Charleston Classic	L 86–90	2–3	26 – McDuffie	8 – McDuffie	5 – Torres	TD Arena (2,862); Charleston, SC
November 25, 2018*; 2:00 pm, Cox YurView		Rice	W 90–61	3–3	21 – Stevenson	6 – Dennis	5 – Tied	Charles Koch Arena (10,089); Wichita, KS
December 1, 2018*; 7:00 pm, CBSSN		Baylor	W 71–63	4–3	21 – Haynes-Jones	10 – Haynes-Jones	3 – Tied	Charles Koch Arena (10,506); Wichita, KS
December 8, 2018*; 11:00 am, ESPNU		vs. Oklahoma; Oklahoma City Showcase	L 48–80	4–4	19 – McDuffie	7 – McDuffie	3 – Torres	Chesapeake Energy Arena (4,137); Oklahoma City, OK
December 12, 2018*; 7:00 pm, Cox YurView		Jacksonville State	W 69–65	5–4	17 – Haynes-Jones	9 – McDuffie	3 – Tied	Charles Koch Arena (10,028); Wichita, KS
December 15, 2018*; 4:30 pm, CBSSN		vs. Southern Miss; Intrust Bank Arena Showcase	W 63–60	6–4	17 – Tied	11 – Echenique	6 – Torres	Intrust Bank Arena (9,356); Wichita, KS
December 19, 2018*; 7:00 pm, Cox YurView		Oral Roberts	W 84–63	7–4	25 – McDuffie	8 – Tied	6 – Torres	Charles Koch Arena (10,156); Wichita, KS
December 22, 2018*; 3:00 pm, ESPN2		at VCU	L 50–74	7–5	16 – McDuffie	8 – Burton	3 – Tied	Siegel Center (7,637); Richmond, VA
American Conference regular season
January 3, 2019; 8:30 pm, CBSSN		at Memphis	L 74–85	7–6 (0–1)	19 – McDuffie	5 – Tied	8 – Torres	FedExForum (15,068); Memphis, TN
January 9, 2019; 3:00 pm, ESPNews		Temple	L 81–85 ^{OT}	7–7 (0–2)	24 – McDuffie	8 – Torres	4 – Dennis	Charles Koch Arena (10,506); Wichita, KS
January 12, 2019; 7:00 pm, CBSSN		at No. 17 Houston	L 70–79	7–8 (0–3)	22 – McDuffie	6 – Dennis	2 – Tied	Fertitta Center (7,039); Houston, TX
January 16, 2019; 9:00 pm, CBSSN		UCF	W 75–67	8–8 (1–3)	23 – McDuffie	9 – Dennis	4 – Stevenson	Charles Koch Arena (10,211); Wichita, KS
January 19, 2019; 1:00 pm, CBS		Cincinnati	L 55–66	8–9 (1–4)	21 – McDuffie	5 – Tied	5 – Burton	Charles Koch Arena (10,254); Wichita, KS
January 22, 2019; 7:00 pm, CBSSN		at South Florida	L 41–54	8–10 (1–5)	11 – McDuffie	6 – Tied	4 – Burton	Yuengling Center (3,153); Tampa, FL
January 26, 2019; 5:00 pm, CBSSN		at UConn	L 60–80	8–11 (1–6)	16 – Burton	5 – Echenique	2 – Tied	Harry A. Gampel Pavilion (10,167); Storrs, CT
January 30, 2019; 8:00 pm, ESPNU		SMU	W 85–83	9–11 (2–6)	17 – Tied	6 – Tied	7 – Burton	Charles Koch Arena (10,096); Wichita, KS
February 2, 2019; 1:00 pm, ESPNU		Tulsa	W 79–68	10–11 (3–6)	27 – McDuffie	7 – McDuffie	6 – Burton	Charles Koch Arena (10,278); Wichita, KS
February 6, 2019; 6:00 pm, ESPNews		at East Carolina	W 65–49	11–11 (4–6)	18 – Haynes-Jones	11 – Midtgaard	4 – Burton	Williams Arena (3,631); Greenville, NC
February 9, 2019; 6:00 pm, ESPNU		Tulane	W 77–62	12–11 (5–6)	25 – McDuffie	8 – McDuffie	5 – Torres	Charles Koch Arena (10,435); Wichita, KS
February 17, 2019; 12:00 pm, ESPN		at Cincinnati	L 62–72	12–12 (5–7)	14 – Dennis	13 – Dennis	4 – Haynes-Jones	Fifth Third Arena (12,223); Cincinnati, OH
February 20, 2019; 8:00 pm, ESPNU		at Tulsa	W 81–60	13–12 (6–7)	18 – Dennis	8 – Dennis	10 – Burton	Reynolds Center (5,002); Tulsa, OK
February 23, 2019; 7:00 pm, ESPN2		Memphis	L 85–88	13–13 (6–8)	17 – Echenique	12 – Echenique	9 – Burton	Charles Koch Arena (10,506); Wichita, KS
February 28, 2019; 6:00 pm, ESPN2		UConn	W 65–63	14–13 (7–8)	20 – Haynes-Jones	10 – Dennis	5 – Burton	Charles Koch Arena (10,506); Wichita, KS
March 3, 2019; 1:00 pm, CBSSN		at SMU	W 67–55	15–13 (8–8)	15 – McDuffie	9 – McDuffie	6 – Stevenson	Moody Coliseum (6,185); Dallas, TX
March 5, 2019; 8:00 pm, CBSSN		East Carolina	W 72–55	16–13 (9–8)	16 – McDuffle	8 – Dennis	4 – Haynes-Jones	Charles Koch Arena (10,205); Wichita, KS
March 9, 2019; 7:30 pm, CBSSN		at Tulane	W 82–79	17–13 (10–8)	15 – Haynes-Jones	34 – Echenique	16 – Burton	Devlin Fieldhouse (1,501); New Orleans, LA
American Conference tournament
March 14, 2019; 9:00 pm, ESPNU	(6)	vs. (11) East Carolina; First Round	W 73–57	18–13	15 – McDuffie	9 – Echenique	4 – Haynes-Jones	FedEx Forum (7,476); Memphis, TN
March 15, 2019; 8:00 pm, ESPNU	(6)	vs. (3) Temple; Quarterfinals	W 80–74	19–13	34 – McDuffie	12 – Tied	5 – Burton	FedEx Forum (7,356); Memphis, TN
March 16, 2019; 4:00 pm, ESPN2	(6)	vs. (2) No. 24 Cincinnati; Semifinals	L 63–66	19–14	18 – McDuffie	6 – Dennis	5 – Burton	FedEx Forum (7,819); Memphis, TN
NIT
March 20, 2019*; 6:00 pm, ESPN3	(6)	at (3) Furman; First Round – Indiana Bracket	W 76–70	20–14	20 – McDuffie	10 – Tied	4 – Burton	Timmons Arena (2,102); Greenville, SC
March 24, 2019*; 1:00 pm, ESPN	(6)	at (2) Clemson; Second Round – Indiana Bracket	W 63–55	21–14	18 – Echenique	11 – Dennis	3 – Tied	Littlejohn Coliseum (3,266); Clemson, SC
March 26, 2019*; 1:00 pm, ESPN	(6)	at (1) Indiana; Quarterfinals – Indiana Bracket	W 73–63	22–14	21 – McDuffie	11 – Echenique	4 – Tied	Simon Skjodt Assembly Hall (10,312); Bloomington, IN
April 2, 2019*; 6:00 pm, ESPN	(6)	vs. (5) Lipscomb; Semifinals	L 64–71	22–15	13 – Dennis	8 – Tied	3 – Tied	Madison Square Garden (4,599); New York City, NY
*Non-conference game. ^{#}Rankings from AP Poll. (#) Tournament seedings in parentheses. All times are in Central Time.
