= Shizz Alston =

American basketball player

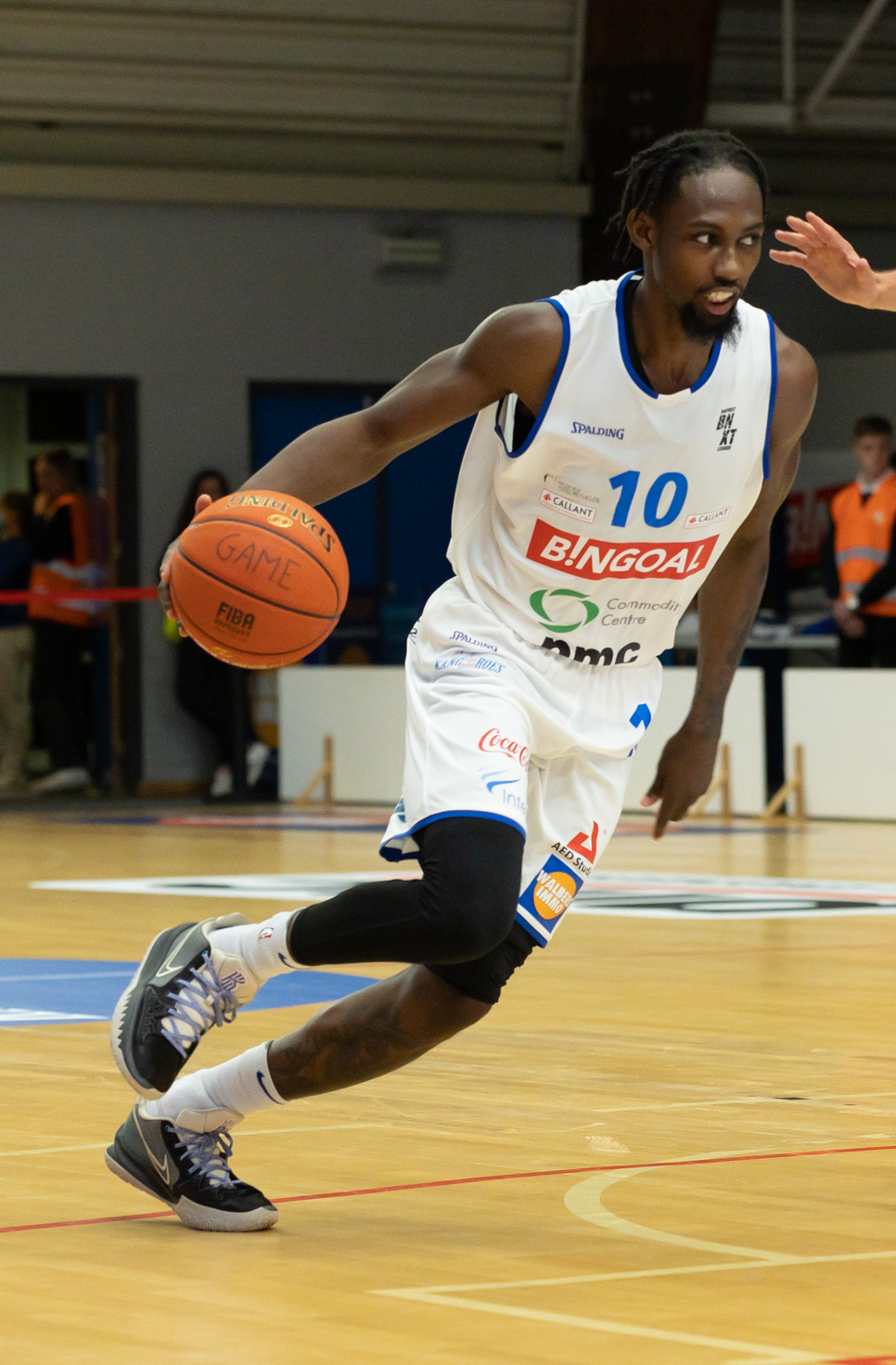
- Alston playing with Kangoeroes in 2021

No. 10 – KB Vëllaznimi
- Position: Point guard
- League: Kosovo Superleague

Personal information
- Born: September 21, 1996 (age 30)
- Listed height: 6 ft 4 in (1.93 m)
- Listed weight: 180 lb (82 kg)

Career information
- High school: The Haverford School (Haverford, Pennsylvania)
- College: Temple (2015–2019)
- NBA draft: 2019: undrafted
- Playing career: 2019–present

Career history
- 2019–2020: Delaware Blue Coats
- 2020–2021: Lavrio
- 2021–2022: Kangoeroes Mechelen
- 2023: SeaHorses Mikawa
- 2024–present: Vëllaznimi

Career highlights
- First-team All-AAC (2019)
- Stats at Basketball Reference

Levan Shawn "Shizz" Alston Jr. (born September 21, 1996) is an American professional basketball player for Vëllaznimi of the Kosovo Superleague. He played college basketball at Temple University.

== Early life ==
Alston grew up in North Philadelphia. His father, Levan Alston Sr., played basketball at Temple in the 1990s and professionally in China, Greece, Cyprus, and Italy. Growing up, the younger Alson would frequently call his father when he was overseas and discuss NBA games. When current Temple coach Aaron McKie played for the 76ers, he would sometimes leave tickets for Shizz. The younger Alston attended The Haverford School and averaged 16.1 points per game as a sophomore. As a junior, he averaged 16.4 points and 5.2 rebounds per game and was named Second Team All State. As a senior, Alston was named First Team All State and led Haverford to a 17–11 record and the semifinals of the Pennsylvania Independent School Tournament. He averaged 19.4 points, 5.1 rebounds, 3.3 assists, and 2.1 steals per game. Alston was named Gatorade Pennsylvania Player of the Year. He was an ESPN Top 100 recruit and selected Temple over offers from Notre Dame, Marquette, and VCU among others.

== College career ==
In his collegiate debut, Alston scored 12 points in a 91–67 loss to North Carolina. His minutes decreased throughout his freshman season, and though Temple reached the NCAA Tournament, Alston considered the season frustrating largely playing behind Quenton DeCosey and Devin Coleman. Alston averaged 2.1 points per game as a freshman. He saw his minutes increase as a sophomore and averaged 13.9 points per game. On December 7, 2017, Alston scored 22 points in a 59–55 win over Wisconsin and broke the Temple record by hitting 52 consecutive free throws. Alston averaged 13.3 points, 3.2 rebounds, and 3.1 assists per game as a junior on a team that reached the NIT. On December 12, 2018, Alston scored 31 points against UMass and hit three clinching free throws. He scored a career-high 34 points in a 78–71 win against UConn on March 7, 2019. As a senior, Alston averaged 19.7 points per game, which led the American Athletic Conference, and 5.0 assists per game, second highest in the league. He was named First Team All-Conference. Alston led Temple to a 23–10 record and NCAA Tournament appearance. Alston set school records by making a three-pointer in 44 consecutive games and shooting 90.8 percent from the foul line as a senior.

== Professional career ==
Prior to the 2019 NBA draft, Alston worked out with the hometown Philadelphia 76ers. He competed for the Indiana Pacers in NBA Summer League play and averaged 8.0 points per game. On October 19, the 76ers signed and waived Alston so they could add him to their G League affiliate, the Delaware Blue Coats. He averaged 3.7 points, 2.9 assists, and 1.8 rebounds per game in 23 games.

On March 11, 2020, Alston signed with GTK Gliwice of the Polish league, but he never made an official appearance with the club. On June 13, 2020, Alston signed with Lavrio of the Greek Basket League.

In May 2021, Alston signed with Belgian side Kangoeroes Mechelen for the 2021–22 season.

On January 17, 2023, Alston signed with SeaHorses Mikawa of the Japanese B.League.

On August 22, 2024, Alston signed for Vëllaznimi of the Kosovan Superleague.

== Coaching career ==
Alston signed with Athletes Untapped as a private basketball coach on May 23, 2023.
