= James Wiseman =

American basketball player (born 2001)

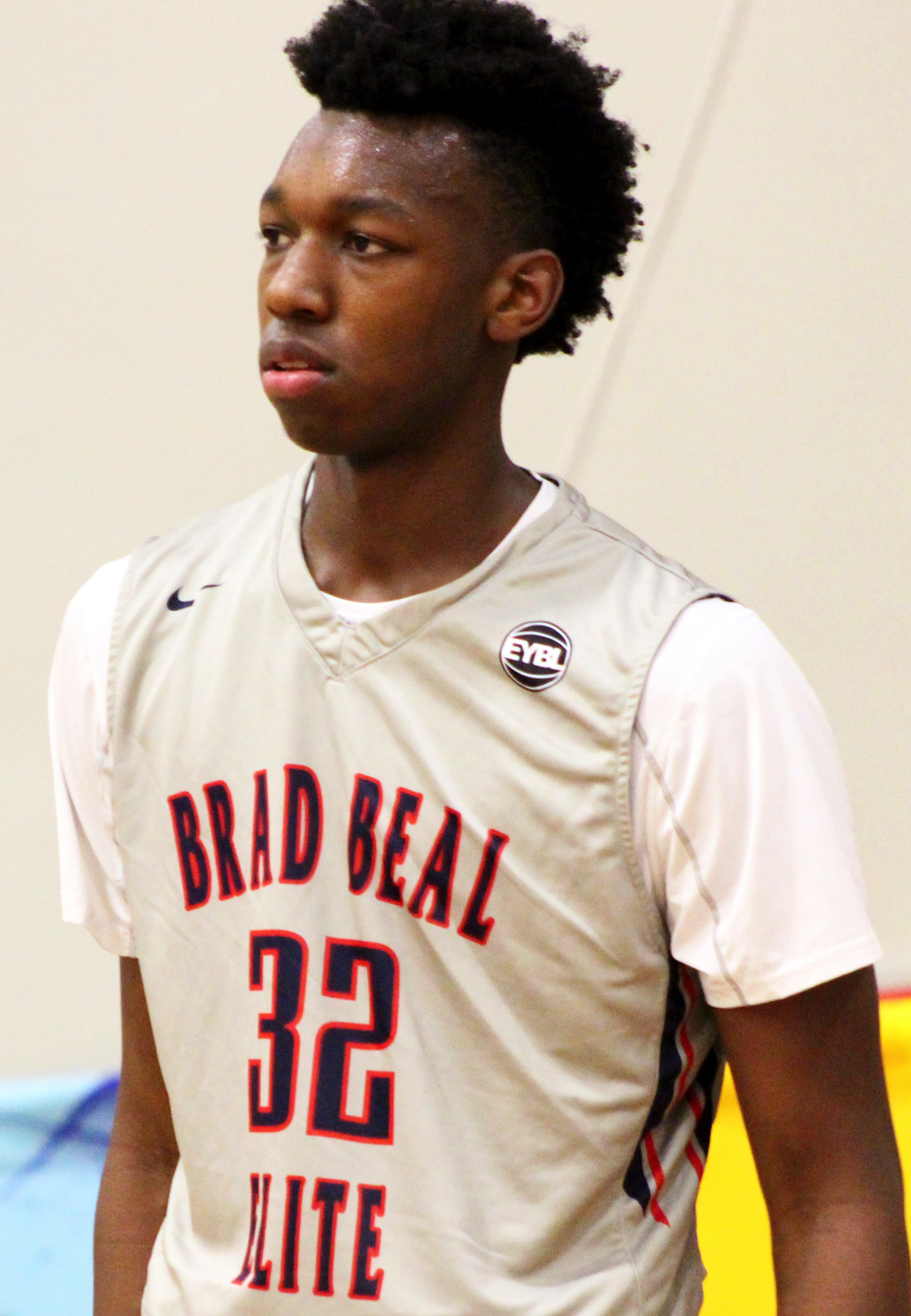
- Wiseman in a youth game in 2017

No. 35 – New York Knicks
- Position: Center
- League: NBA

Personal information
- Born: March 31, 2001 (age 25) Nashville, Tennessee, U.S.
- Listed height: 7 ft 0 in (2.13 m)
- Listed weight: 240 lb (109 kg)

Career information
- High school: The Ensworth School (Nashville, Tennessee); East (Memphis, Tennessee)
- College: Memphis (2019–2020)
- NBA draft: 2020: 1st round, 2nd overall pick
- Drafted by: Golden State Warriors
- Playing career: 2020–present

Career history
- 2020–2023: Golden State Warriors
- 2022–2023: →Santa Cruz Warriors
- 2023–2024: Detroit Pistons
- 2024–2025: Indiana Pacers
- 2026–present: New York Knicks

Career highlights
- NBA champion (2022); Morgan Wootten National Player of the Year (2019); Gatorade National Player of the Year (2019); McDonald's All-American (2019); Tennessee Mr. Basketball (2019)
- Stats at NBA.com
- Stats at Basketball Reference
Medals
Representing the United States
FIBA Americas U16 Championship
Gold medal – first place	2017 Argentina	National team

James Monteinez Wiseman (/ˈwaɪzmən/ WYZE-mən; born March 31, 2001) is an American professional basketball player for the New York Knicks of the National Basketball Association (NBA). He played college basketball for the Memphis Tigers. Listed at 7 feet 0 inches (2.13 m), he plays the center position.

Wiseman began high school at The Ensworth School in his hometown of Nashville, Tennessee before transferring to Memphis East High School in Memphis, Tennessee, where he was coached by former NBA player Penny Hardaway for his first year. As a senior, Wiseman was a consensus five-star recruit, with most recruiting services ranking him number one in the 2019 class. He claimed multiple national player of the year awards and played in the McDonald's All-American Game after his final season.

In college, Wiseman joined Memphis to play for Hardaway, who had become the Tigers' coach. Early into his freshman season, he was suspended by the National Collegiate Athletic Association (NCAA), which deemed that Hardaway had acted as a booster by facilitating Wiseman's move to Memphis, Tennessee in 2017. He served part of the suspension before withdrawing from school to prepare for the 2020 NBA draft, where he was drafted with the second overall pick by the Golden State Warriors. He won an NBA championship with the team in 2022, despite being injured and not appearing in any games during the season. He was then traded to the Detroit Pistons in 2023, before signing with the Indiana Pacers in 2024. .

== High school career ==
Entering his freshman season for The Ensworth School in Nashville, Tennessee, Wiseman stood 6 ft 9 in (2.06 m) and weighed 200 pounds (91 kg). He was a teammate of future NBA player Jordan Bone. By June 2016, ESPN ranked Wiseman among its top 25 players in the 2020 recruiting class. In 2016, he played for the St. Louis Eagles Amateur Athletic Union team. As a sophomore in 2016–17, he guided Ensworth to the Tennessee Secondary School Athletic Association (TSSAA) Division II-AA semifinals. He averaged about 20 points and 10 rebounds per game and was named MaxPreps Sophomore All-American honorable mention.

In May 2017, Wiseman joined Team Penny, founded by former NBA player Penny Hardaway, on the Nike Elite Youth Basketball League (EYBL) circuit. In August, he announced his transfer to Memphis East High School in Memphis, Tennessee, where Hardaway was promoted to head coach. On November 16, 2017, the TSSAA ruled Wiseman ineligible for his junior season because an "athletic coaching link" existed between him and Hardaway. However, on December 13, he was cleared to play because the TSSAA rule was "not clear in its application". During the season, Wiseman rose to become the number one overall recruit by ESPN in the 2019 class. On March 17, 2018, he led Memphis East to a TSSAA Class AAA championship, leading all scorers with 19 points. He averaged 18.5 points, 8.2 rebounds, and 2.8 blocks per game, earning MaxPreps Junior All-American third team recognition.

Entering his senior season, Wiseman remained at Memphis East instead of transferring to a prep school, citing "the East High tradition" and the improvements he made as a junior with the program. On March 1, 2019, he recorded a triple-double of 27 points, 20 rebounds, and 10 blocks to help his team win the Region 8AAA championship. Memphis East finished as TSSAA Class AAA runners-up to Bearden High School, even though Wiseman posted 24 points, 11 rebounds, and five blocks in his final high school game. After averaging 25.8 points, 14.8 rebounds, and 5.5 blocks as a senior, he was named Gatorade National Player of the Year and Morgan Wootten National Player of the Year. Wiseman also won the Tennessee Class AAA Mr. Basketball award while appearing in the McDonald's All-American Game, the Jordan Brand Classic, and the Nike Hoop Summit. He shared most valuable player (MVP) accolades with Cole Anthony at the Jordan Brand Classic.

In October 2019, after Wiseman had moved on to the University of Memphis, the TSSAA's original ruling of ineligibility for the 2017–18 season was upheld by a Memphis judge, who ruled that the TSSAA coaching link rule was not too vague and did not violate Wiseman's property rights as an athlete.

=== Recruiting ===
Wiseman was a consensus five-star recruit out of high school and was considered the top recruit in the 2019 class by 247Sports and ESPN. On November 20, 2018, he committed to Memphis despite strongly considering Kentucky. As a result, he reunited with former high school coach Penny Hardaway, who had become the team's head coach in the previous season. On November 29, Wiseman signed a National Letter of Intent to play college basketball for Memphis.

College recruiting
Name	Hometown	School	Height	Weight	Commit date
James Wiseman; C	Nashville, TN	Memphis East (TN)	7 ft 1 in (2.16 m)	230 lb (100 kg)	Nov 20, 2018
James Wiseman; C	Recruit ratings: Rivals: 247Sports: ESPN: (97)				
Overall recruit ranking: Rivals: 1 247Sports: 2 ESPN: 1
Note: In many cases, Scout, Rivals, 247Sports, On3, and ESPN may conflict in their listings of height and weight.; In these cases, the average was taken. ESPN grades are on a 100-point scale.; Sources: "Memphis 2019 Basketball Commitments". Rivals.; "2019 Memphis Tigers Recruiting Class". ESPN.; "2019 Team Ranking". Rivals.

== College career ==
Wiseman was projected to be the first overall pick in the 2020 NBA draft. In August 2019, a minor shoulder injury kept Wiseman from joining Memphis for a series of preseason exhibition games in Nassau, Bahamas. He missed his team's two preseason games in October after sustaining an ankle injury. On November 5, Wiseman made his regular season debut with 28 points, 11 rebounds, and three blocks in 22 minutes as the Tigers defeated South Carolina State, 97–64.

On November 8, Wiseman's lawyers announced that the National Collegiate Athletic Association (NCAA) ruled him ineligible to play for Memphis. The University of Memphis stated that head coach Penny Hardaway had paid for $11,500 in moving expenses to help him and his family move to the city of Memphis in 2017. According to Wiseman's lawyer, Leslie Ballin, the NCAA deemed that Hardaway, a Memphis alumnus, had acted as a booster. On the same day, a Shelby County judge granted Wiseman a temporary restraining order against the NCAA's ruling, allowing him to keep playing. Less than two hours later, he had 17 points and nine rebounds to lead Memphis past UIC, 92–46. Wiseman's lawyers filed a lawsuit against the NCAA to restore his eligibility before withdrawing the case six days later in hopes of reaching an agreement. On November 20, the NCAA ruled that Wiseman would be eligible to return on January 12 after serving a 12-game suspension if he donated $11,500 to a charity of his choice.

On December 19, 2019, after missing seven games due to suspension, Wiseman announced that he would leave Memphis, hire an agent and prepare for the 2020 NBA draft, effectively ending his college career. He was one of the highest-rated prospects in his class, according to draft analysts. Wiseman was considered a potential number one pick.

== Professional career ==
=== Golden State Warriors (2020–2023) ===
Wiseman was selected with the second overall pick in the 2020 NBA draft by the Golden State Warriors. On December 22, 2020, he made his NBA debut with 19 points, six rebounds, and two steals in a 125–99 loss to the Brooklyn Nets. On January 27, 2021, Wiseman scored a season-high 25 points, along with six rebounds, in a 123–111 win over the Minnesota Timberwolves. On April 11, it was revealed that Wiseman suffered a torn right meniscus. On April 15, he underwent successful surgery to repair the injury, and was subsequently ruled out for the remainder of the season.

On March 9, 2022, Wiseman was assigned to the Santa Cruz Warriors, Golden State's NBA G League affiliate team, to play games before returning to the NBA. On March 16, he was recalled by Golden State, but was assigned to Santa Cruz again a day later. However, on March 19, Wiseman suffered a setback in his rehab and was shut down by Golden State. On March 25, he was ruled out for the remainder of the season. Despite being injured during the season, Wiseman won an NBA championship with the Warriors when they defeated the Boston Celtics in six games.

On July 10, 2022, Wiseman made his return from injury in the 2022 NBA Summer League, putting up 11 points, two rebounds, and two blocks in an 86–85 win over the San Antonio Spurs. On December 21, Wiseman scored a career-high 30 points in a 143–113 loss to the Brooklyn Nets. On December 30, 2022, Wiseman sprained his ankle during a 3-on-3 scrimmage and subsequently did not play in the following games for Golden State.

=== Detroit Pistons (2023–2024) ===
On February 9, 2023, Wiseman was traded to the Detroit Pistons in a four-team trade involving the Portland Trail Blazers and Atlanta Hawks, with Golden State reacquiring Gary Payton II from Portland. He made his Pistons debut on February 15, recording 11 points and five rebounds in a 127–109 loss to the Boston Celtics.

=== Indiana Pacers (2024–2025) ===
On July 5, 2024, Wiseman signed a 2-year contract with the Indiana Pacers including a team option. On October 23, Wiseman tore his left Achilles tendon in the season-opening game against the Detroit Pistons.

On February 6, 2025, Wiseman was traded to the Toronto Raptors alongside cash considerations in exchange for a 2026 top 55 protected second-round pick, but was waived shortly after.

On July 7, 2025, Wiseman re-signed with the Pacers on a 2-year contract including a team option. He started one game for Indiana, recording four points, four rebounds, and one block. On October 27, the Pacers waived Wiseman to open up a roster spot to sign Mac McClung. On December 20, Wiseman signed a 10-day contract with the Pacers. On December 26, after three appearances for the team, Wiseman was released from his contract with the Pacers.

=== New York Knicks (2026–present) ===
On September 16, 2026, Wiseman signed with the New York Knicks on an Exhibit 9 contract. On October 16, Wiseman’s contract was converted to a standard NBA contract, at the leagues veteran minimum.

== National team career ==
Wiseman averaged 11.4 points and 5 rebounds per game for the United States at the 2017 FIBA Under-16 Americas Championship in Formosa, Argentina. He helped his team win the gold medal over Canada. Wiseman was unable to join the United States for the 2018 FIBA Under-17 Basketball World Cup because he was injured.

== Career statistics ==
Legend
GP	Games played	GS	Games started	MPG	Minutes per game
FG%	Field goal percentage	3P%	3-point field goal percentage	FT%	Free throw percentage
RPG	Rebounds per game	APG	Assists per game	SPG	Steals per game
BPG	Blocks per game	PPG	Points per game	**Bold**	Career high

=== NBA ===
Year	Team	GP	GS	MPG	FG%	3P%	FT%	RPG	APG	SPG	BPG	PPG
2020–21	Golden State	39	**27**	21.4	.519	.316	.628	5.8	.7	**.3**	**.9**	11.5
2022–23	Golden State	21	0	12.5	**.628**	**.500**	.684	3.5	.7	.1	.3	6.9
2022–23	Detroit	24	22	**25.2**	.531	.167	.712	**8.1**	.7	.2	.8	**12.7**
2023–24	Detroit	**63**	6	17.3	.613	.000	.706	5.3	**.9**	.2	.6	7.1
2024–25	Indiana	1	0	4.6	.500	.000	**1.000**	1.0	.0	.0	.0	6.0
2025–26	Indiana	4	1	14.5	.600	.000	.500	2.0	.8	.0	.3	3.3
Career		152	56	18.8	.560	.262	.682	5.5	.7	.2	.7	9.0

=== College ===
Year	Team	GP	GS	MPG	FG%	3P%	FT%	RPG	APG	SPG	BPG	PPG
2019–20	Memphis	3	3	23.0	.769	.000	.704	10.3	.3	.3	3.0	19.7
Career		3	3	23.0	.769	.000	.704	10.3	.3	.3	3.0	19.7
