= D. J. Jeffries =

American basketball player (born 1999)

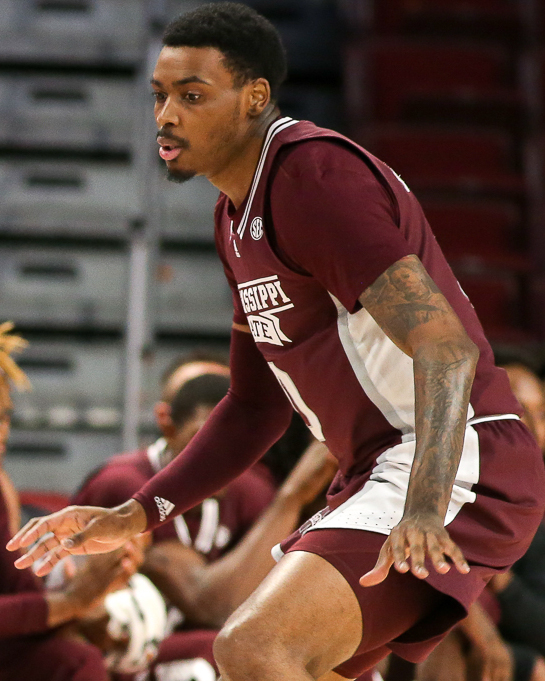
- Jeffries with Mississippi State in 2023

No. 3 – Raptors 905
- Position: Small forward
- League: NBA G League

Personal information
- Born: December 28, 1999 (age 26)
- Listed height: 6 ft 7 in (2.01 m)
- Listed weight: 215 lb (98 kg)

Career information
- High school: Olive Branch (Olive Branch, Mississippi)
- College: Memphis (2019–2021); Mississippi State (2021–2024)
- NBA draft: 2024: undrafted
- Playing career: 2024–present

Career history
- 2025–present: Raptors 905

Career highlights
- NIT champion (2021)

De'Corian Terrell Jeffries (born December 28, 1999) is an American professional basketball player for Raptors 905 of the NBA G League. He played college basketball for the Memphis Tigers and the Mississippi State Bulldogs.

== Early life and high school career ==
In third grade, Jeffries learned how to play basketball from his uncle at the local YMCA. He played the sport for Cordova Middle School in Memphis, Tennessee and stood 6'3 by seventh grade. Jeffries began dunking regularly by eighth grade. Jeffries played for Olive Branch High School in Olive Branch, Mississippi. As a junior, he averaged 20.8 points per game, leading his team to the Class 5A state title. He was named Clarion-Ledger Player of the Year as the top player in Mississippi. In his senior season, Jeffries averaged 23.3 points, 12.8 rebounds, 5.6 assists and 2.6 blocks per game, leading Olive Branch to a Class 5A state runner-up finish while being named Mississippi Gatorade Player of the Year. He was selected to play in the Jordan Brand Classic.

=== Recruiting ===
On March 12, 2018, Jeffries committed to play college basketball for Kentucky over offers from Alabama and Mississippi State, among others. He decommitted from Kentucky on July 30, becoming the first Kentucky decommit under coach John Calipari. Jeffries committed to Memphis on October 27. By the end of his high school career, he was considered a five-star recruit by ESPN and a four-star recruit by 247Sports and Rivals. Jeffries was the number one recruit from Mississippi in the 2019 class.

College recruiting
Name	Hometown	School	Height	Weight	Commit date
D. J. Jeffries; SF	Olive Branch, MS	Olive Branch (MS)	6 ft 7 in (2.01 m)	210 lb (95 kg)	Oct 27, 2018
D. J. Jeffries; SF	Recruit ratings: Rivals: 247Sports: ESPN: (91)				
Overall recruit ranking: Rivals: 51 247Sports: 81 ESPN: 25
Note: In many cases, Scout, Rivals, 247Sports, On3, and ESPN may conflict in their listings of height and weight.; In these cases, the average was taken. ESPN grades are on a 100-point scale.; Sources: "Memphis 2019 Basketball Commitments". Rivals.; "2019 Memphis Tigers Recruiting Class". ESPN.; "2019 Team Ranking". Rivals.

== College career ==
Jeffries debuted for Memphis on November 5, 2019, recording five points, four rebounds, four assists and four blocks in a 97–64 win over South Carolina State. On November 23, he scored a freshman season-high 23 points to go with four rebounds in an 87–86 victory over the Ole Miss Rebels. Jeffries missed a January 4, 2020 game against Georgia with the flu. On January 20, 2020, he was named American Athletic Conference (AAC) Freshman of the Week, four days after scoring 18 points in a 60–49 win over Cincinnati. At practice on January 30, Jeffries partially tore his posterior cruciate ligament in his left knee and was expected to miss four to six weeks of action. On March 3, after missing nine games with the injury, he was ruled out for the remainder of the season. Jeffries started in 13 of his 19 games as a freshman, averaging 10.8 points and 4.3 rebounds per game. As a sophomore, he averaged 9.9 points and 5.1 rebounds per game, helping Memphis win the 2021 National Invitation Tournament. After the season, Jeffries transferred to Mississippi State.

== Professional career ==
After going undrafted in the 2024 NBA draft, on June 30, 2024, Jeffries joined the Memphis Grizzlies for the 2024 NBA Summer League and on October 28, 2024, he signed with the Windy City Bulls. However, he was waived on November 4.

== Career statistics ==
Legend
GP	Games played	GS	Games started	MPG	Minutes per game
FG%	Field goal percentage	3P%	3-point field goal percentage	FT%	Free throw percentage
RPG	Rebounds per game	APG	Assists per game	SPG	Steals per game
BPG	Blocks per game	PPG	Points per game	**Bold**	Career high

=== College ===
Year	Team	GP	GS	MPG	FG%	3P%	FT%	RPG	APG	SPG	BPG	PPG
2019–20	Memphis	19	13	27.1	**.513**	**.390**	**.743**	4.3	1.5	.7	**1.1**	**10.8**
2020–21	Memphis	28	11	25.6	.443	.352	.562	5.1	**1.9**	.9	.9	9.9
2021–22	Mississippi State	**34**	31	28.1	.423	.293	.726	4.2	**1.9**	.7	.5	8.9
2022–23	Mississippi State	**34**	**34**	**31.2**	.351	.272	.579	**6.4**	1.8	**1.1**	.4	8.8
Career		115	89	28.2	.420	.307	.638	5.1	1.8	.9	.7	9.4

== Personal life ==
Jeffries' cousins, Chandler, Dedric and K. J. Lawson, have played basketball at the collegiate or professional levels. He is the son of Shatonya and Corey Jeffries.
