= Markis McDuffie =

American basketball player (born 1997)

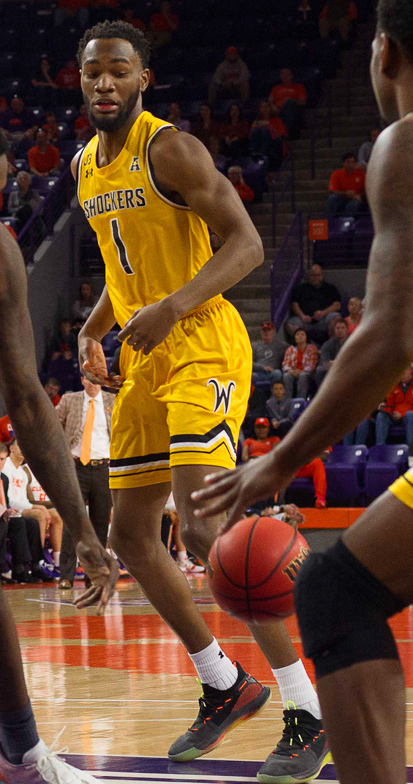
- McDuffie with Wichita State

No. 1 – Maccabi Ashdod
- Position: Small forward / power forward
- League: Israeli Basketball Premier League

Personal information
- Born: September 6, 1997 (age 29) Paterson, New Jersey, U.S.
- Listed height: 6 ft 8 in (2.03 m)
- Listed weight: 220 lb (100 kg)

Career information
- High school: St. Anthony (Jersey City, New Jersey)
- College: Wichita State (2015–2019)
- NBA draft: 2019: undrafted
- Playing career: 2019–present

Career history
- 2019–2020: Alba Fehérvár
- 2020–2021: Unione Cestistica Casalpusterlengo
- 2021–2022: Napoli Basket
- 2022–2023: JDA Dijon
- 2023–2024: Türk Telekom
- 2024: Victoria Libertas Pesaro
- 2024–2025: JDA Dijon
- 2026–present: Maccabi Ashdod

Career highlights
- All-LNB Pro A Second Team (2023); LNB All-Star (2022); Second-team All-AAC (2019); First-team All-MVC (2017); MVC Freshman of the Year (2016); MVC All-Freshman Team (2016)

Markis Derek McDuffie (born September 6, 1997) is an American professional basketball player for Maccabi Ashdod of the Israeli Basketball Premier League.

He played high school basketball at St. Anthony High School under Hall of Fame coach Bob Hurley. McDuffie played four seasons of college basketball for the Wichita State Shockers. He earned Missouri Valley Conference (MVC) Freshman of the Year honors in 2016, and was named First-Team All-MVC. As a senior in 2018–19, he earned Second-Team All-AAC and NIT All-Tournament Team honors.

McDuffie began his professional career in Europe. During his 2022–23 season with JDA Dijon in France's LNB Pro A, he was selected as an LNB All-Star and named to the All-LNB Pro A Second Team.

== High school career ==
McDuffie grew up in Paterson, New Jersey and played for the Sports U program as a child. He attended St. Anthony High School in Jersey City, New Jersey, playing under Hall of Fame coach Bob Hurley. As a junior, McDuffie averaged 14.4 points per game.

As a senior in 2014–15, he averaged 15.0 points and 7.0 rebounds per game, helping lead St. Anthony to a 28–2 record. Ranked as the No. 92 overall recruit in the Class of 2015 by ESPN, he committed to playing college basketball for Wichita State over VCU, Boston College, SMU, Maryland, and Rutgers, among others.

== College career ==
McDuffie played four seasons of college basketball at Wichita State for the Wichita State Shockers. As a freshman, in 34 games he averaged 18.5 minutes, 7.4 points, and 3.3 rebounds per game. He earned Missouri Valley Conference (MVC) Freshman of the Year honors in 2015–16, and was named to the MVC All-Freshman Team.

As a sophomore, in 36 games McDuffie averaged 25.5 minutes, 11.5 points, 5.7 rebounds, 1.7 assists, and 1.2 steals per game, while shooting 45.8% from the field and 81.9% from the free throw line, and won both the regular season and tournament conference titles. He was named to the First Team All-MVC, and to the NABC All-District (16) First Team.

McDuffie was limited to 22 games during his junior season, due to an early-stage stress fracture along the top of the navicular bone of his left foot, missing the first 11 games of the regular season. He averaged 18.9 minutes, 8.5 points, 3.1 rebounds, and 1.1 assists per game. Following the season, McDuffie declared for the 2018 NBA draft, but he ultimately returned to Wichita State.

As a senior in 2018–19, in 37 games he averaged 33.4 minutes, 18.2 points, 5.0 rebounds, 1.0 assists, and 1.0 steals per game, while shooting 81.6% from the free throw line. McDuffie helped lead the team to the NIT semifinals. He was named to the Second Team All-AAC, AAC All-Tournament Team, Charleston Classic All-Tournament Team, and to the NABC All-District (25) Second Team. McDuffie finished his Wichita State career ranking among the program's top 10 all-time in three-point field goals made (160).

== Professional career ==
McDuffie joined the Indiana Pacers in the 2019 NBA Summer League, playing three games in which he averaged 10.9 minutes.

=== Alba Fehérvár ===
In August 2019, he signed with Alba Fehérvár of the Hungarian Nemzeti Bajnokság I/A. In 21 games McDuffie averaged 23.7 minutes, 12.5 points , 4.6 rebounds, and 1.0 assists per game, while shooting 47.5% from the field.

=== Unione Cestistica Casalpusterlengo ===
On August 7, 2020, he signed with Unione Cestistica Casalpusterlengo of the Italian Serie A2 Basket. In 30 games McDuffie averaged 30.4 minutes, 20.4 points, 6.3 rebounds, 1.7 assists, and 1.3 steals per game for the team, shooting 48.6% from the floor and 80.1% from the free throw line.

=== Napoli Basket ===
On August 6, 2021, he signed with Napoli Basket of the Italian Lega Basket Serie A. In 30 games McDuffie averaged 28.3 minutes, 14.0 points, 4.9 rebounds, and 1.0 steals per game, shooting 81.0% from the free throw line.

=== JDA Dijon ===
On July 13, 2022, he signed with JDA Dijon of the LNB Pro A. In 52 games McDuffie averaged 24.8 minutes, 11.0 points, 3.3 rebounds, and 1.4 assists per game, shooting 47.2% from the floor and 84.6% from the free throw line, and was named to the All-LNB Pro A Second Team and selected as a 2022 LNB All-Star.

=== Türk Telekom ===
On June 26, 2023, he signed with Türk Telekom of the Turkish Basketbol Süper Ligi (BSL). He played 19 games for the team, averaging 18.1 minutes, 6.9 points, and 3.6 rebounds per game.

=== Victoria Libertas Pesaro ===
On January 17, 2024, he signed with Victoria Libertas Pesaro of the Italian Lega Basket Serie A (LBA). In 13 games McDuffie averaged 30.8 minutes, 16.3 points, 6.3 rebounds, 1.6 assists, and 1.5 steals per game, shooting 84.4% from the free throw line.

=== return to JDA Dijon ===
On July 25, 2024, he signed with JDA Dijon of the LNB Pro A for a second stint. In 55 games McDuffie averaged 24.8 minutes, 11.0 points, 3.3 rebounds, and 1.4 assists per game, shooting 47.2% from the floor and 84.6% from the free throw line.

=== Nancy Basket ===
In 2025-26 he played for Nancy Basket in the LNB Pro A. In 20 games McDuffie averaged 21.1 minutes, 6.0 points, 2.4 rebounds, and 1.4 assists per game.

=== Maccabi Ashdod ===
On August 17, 2026, he signed with Maccabi Ashdod of the Israeli Basketball Premier League.

== Career statistics ==
Legend
GP	Games played	GS	Games started	MPG	Minutes per game
FG%	Field goal percentage	3P%	3-point field goal percentage	FT%	Free throw percentage
RPG	Rebounds per game	APG	Assists per game	SPG	Steals per game
BPG	Blocks per game	PPG	Points per game	**Bold**	Career high

=== College ===
Year	Team	GP	GS	MPG	FG%	3P%	FT%	RPG	APG	SPG	BPG	PPG
2015–16	Wichita State	34	1	18.5	.426	.315	.714	3.3	.7	.8	.2	7.4
2016–17	Wichita State	36	28	25.5	**.458**	**.355**	**.819**	**5.7**	**1.7**	**1.2**	**.3**	11.5
2017–18	Wichita State	22	4	18.9	.444	.339	.731	3.1	1.1	.4	.1	8.5
2018–19	Wichita State	**37**	**37**	**33.4**	.408	.341	.816	5.0	1.0	1.0	.2	**18.2**
Career		129	70	24.8	.428	.340	.791	4.4	1.1	.9	.2	11.8
