= 2018–19 Houston Cougars men's basketball team =

American college basketball season

2018–19 Houston Cougars men's basketball

AAC regular season champions

NCAA tournament, Sweet Sixteen
- Conference: American Athletic Conference

Ranking
- Coaches: No. 12
- AP: No. 11
- Record: 33–4 (16–2 AAC)
- Head coach: Kelvin Sampson (5th season)
- Assistant coaches: Alvin Brooks; Kellen Sampson; Quannas White
- Home arena: H&PE Arena; Fertitta Center

2018–19 American Athletic Conference men's basketball standings
	Conf.				Overall
Team	W		L	PCT	W		L	PCT
No. 11 Houston	16	–	2	.889	33	–	4	.892
No. 22 Cincinnati †	14	–	4	.778	28	–	7	.800
Temple	13	–	5	.722	23	–	10	.697
UCF	13	–	5	.722	24	–	9	.727
Memphis	11	–	7	.611	22	–	14	.611
Wichita State	10	–	8	.556	22	–	15	.595
Tulsa	8	–	10	.444	18	–	14	.563
South Florida	8	–	10	.444	24	–	14	.632
UConn	6	–	12	.333	16	–	17	.485
SMU	6	–	12	.333	15	–	17	.469
East Carolina	3	–	15	.167	10	–	21	.323
Tulane	0	–	18	.000	4	–	27	.129
† 2019 AAC tournament winner Rankings from AP poll

The 2018–19 Houston Cougars men's basketball team represented the University of Houston during the 2018–19 NCAA Division I men's basketball season. The Cougars were led by fifth-year head coach Kelvin Sampson as members of the American Athletic Conference. Beginning December 1, 2018, they played their home games at Fertitta Center, which reopened after a $60 million upgrade. The Cougars played their first four non-conference home games at H&PE Arena while construction on Fertitta Center was completed.

Houston finished the 2018–19 regular season 29–2, including an AAC-best 16–2 record in conference play. They were the runner-up in the American Athletic Conference tournament, falling 69–57 to Cincinnati in the final. The Cougars earned the #3 seed in the Midwest Region of the NCAA tournament, where they went 2–1, advancing to the Sweet Sixteen before falling 62–58 to Kentucky. Houston's final overall season record of 33–4 set a program record for wins.

== Previous season ==
The Cougars finished the 2017–18 season 27–8, 14–4 in AAC play to finish in a tie for second place. As the No. 3 seed in the AAC tournament, they defeated UCF and Wichita State before losing to Cincinnati in the championship game. The Cougars received an at-large bid to the NCAA tournament as the No. 6 seed in the West region. They defeated San Diego State in the First Round before losing to eventual National Runner-up Michigan in the Second Round.

== Offseason ==
=== Departures ===
Name	Number	Pos.	Height	Weight	Year	Hometown	Reason for departure
Mike Adewunmi	2	G	6'4"	210	Freshman	Mansfield, TX	Transferred to McLennan CC
Wes VanBeck	12	G	6'3"	195	Senior	Houston, TX	Graduated
Nura Zanna	13	F	6'6"	240	RS Senior	Kaduna, Nigeria	Graduated
Devin Davis	15	F	6'6"	225	RS Senior	Indianapolis, IN	Graduated
Gabe Grant	20	F	6'4"	220	Junior	Chicago, IL	Transferred to Buffalo
Valentine Sangoyomi	31	C	6'8"	240	RS Junior	Lagos, Nigeria	Transferred
Rob Gray	32	G	6'1"	185	RS Senior	Forest City, NC	Graduated

=== Incoming transfers ===
Name	Number	Pos.	Height	Weight	Year	Hometown	Previous School
Landon Goesling	2	G	6'2"	175	Graduate Student	Bakersfield, CA	St. Edward's
Justin Gorham	4	F	6'7"	230	Junior	Baltimore, MD	Towson
DeJon Jarreau	13	G	6'5"	182	RS Sophomore	New Orleans, LA	Howard College
Brison Gresham	55	F/C	6'9"	210	RS Sophomore	New Orleans, LA	Howard College

=== 2018 recruiting class ===
College recruiting information
Name	Hometown	School	Height	Weight	Commit date
Nate Hinton #24 SF	Gastonia, NC	Gaston Day School	6 ft 6 in (1.98 m)	198 lb (90 kg)	Sep 18, 2017
Nate Hinton #24 SF	Recruit ratings: Scout: Rivals: (82)				
Overall recruit ranking: Scout: NR Rivals: NR ESPN: NR
Note: In many cases, Scout, Rivals, 247Sports, On3, and ESPN may conflict in their listings of height and weight.; In these cases, the average was taken. ESPN grades are on a 100-point scale.; Sources: "Houston Basketball Commitment List". Rivals.; "2018 Houston Basketball Commitment List". Scout.; "ESPN". ESPN.; "Scout.com Team Recruiting Rankings". Scout.; "2018 Team Ranking". Rivals.

== Roster ==
2018–19 Houston Cougars men's basketball team
Players
Coaches

Pos.	#	Name	Height	Weight	Year	Previous school	Hometown
C	1	Chris Harris Jr.	6 ft 10 in (2.08 m)	245 lb (111 kg)	RS Jr	San Jacinto JC	Houston, Texas
G	2	Landon Goesling	6 ft 2 in (1.88 m)	170 lb (77 kg)	GS	St. Edward's	Bakersfield, California
G	3	Armoni Brooks	6 ft 3 in (1.91 m)	195 lb (88 kg)	Jr	McNeil High School	Round Rock, Texas
F	4	Justin Gorham (redshirt)	6 ft 7 in (2.01 m)	225 lb (102 kg)	Jr	Towson	Baltimore, Maryland
G	5	Corey Davis Jr.	6 ft 1 in (1.85 m)	190 lb (86 kg)	Sr	San Jacinto JC	Lafayette, Louisiana
G	11	Nate Hinton	6 ft 6 in (1.98 m)	210 lb (95 kg)	Fr	Gaston Day School	Gastonia, North Carolina
G	13	DeJon Jarreau	6 ft 5 in (1.96 m)	185 lb (84 kg)	RS So	UMass	New Orleans, Louisiana
G	15	Neil VanBeck (W)	6 ft 4 in (1.93 m)	200 lb (91 kg)	Fr	Westside High School	Houston, Texas
F	23	Cedrick Alley Jr.	6 ft 5 in (1.96 m)	230 lb (104 kg)	RS Fr	Klein Forest High School	Houston, Texas
F	24	Breaon Brady	6 ft 8 in (2.03 m)	260 lb (118 kg)	Sr	Saddleback JC	Akron, Ohio
G	25	Galen Robinson Jr.	6 ft 1 in (1.85 m)	190 lb (86 kg)	Sr	Westbury Christian School	Houston, Texas
C	30	Caleb Broodo (W)	6 ft 7 in (2.01 m)	230 lb (104 kg)	RS Fr	Dow High School	Midland, Michigan
F	35	Fabian White Jr.	6 ft 7 in (2.01 m)	230 lb (104 kg)	So	Atascocita High School	Atascocita, Texas
F/C	55	Brison Gresham	6 ft 8 in (2.03 m)	225 lb (102 kg)	RS So	UMass	New Orleans, Louisiana

Head coach

- Kelvin Sampson (UNC Pembroke)

Assistant coach(es)

- Alvin Brooks (Lamar)
- Kellen Sampson (Oklahoma)
- Quannas White (Oklahoma)

Legend

- (C) Team captain
- (S) Suspended
- (I) Ineligible
- (W) Walk-on
- Injured
- Current redshirt

Roster

== Schedule and results ==
Date time, TV	Rank^{#}	Opponent^{#}	Result	Record	High points	High rebounds	High assists	Site (attendance) city, state
Exhibition
November 1, 2018*; 7:00 pm		Dallas Baptist	W 89–60	–	27 – Davis	10 – Tied	10 – Jarreau	H&PE Arena (1,000); Houston, TX
Non-conference regular season
November 10, 2018*; 7:00 pm, ESPN3		Alabama A&M; Men Against Breast Cancer Cup	W 101–54	1–0	24 – Brooks	7 – Hinton	9 – Robinson	H&PE Arena (3,725); Houston, TX
November 14, 2018*; 7:00 pm, ESPN3		Rice; Men Against Breast Cancer Cup	W 79–68	2–0	20 – Brooks	8 – Gresham	6 – Tied	H&PE Arena (3,952); Houston, TX
November 19, 2018*; 7:00 pm		Northwestern State; Men Against Breast Cancer Cup	W 82–55	3–0	16 – Brooks	8 – Tied	7 – Robinson	H&PE Arena (3,784); Houston, TX
November 24, 2018*; 5:00 pm		at BYU; Men Against Breast Cancer Cup	W 76–62	4–0	24 – Davis	7 – Brady	6 – Tied	Marriott Center (10,959); Provo, UT
November 28, 2018*; 7:00 pm		Texas–Rio Grande Valley	W 58–53	5–0	23 – Davis	12 – Brooks	4 – Davis	H&PE Arena (3,972); Houston, TX
December 1, 2018*; 8:00 pm, ESPN2		No. 18 Oregon	W 65–61	6–0	22 – Brooks	9 – Brooks	7 – Robinson	Fertitta Center (7,035); Houston, TX
December 4, 2018*; 7:00 pm, ESPN3		Lamar	W 79–56	7–0	20 – Robinson	9 – Brooks	7 – Davis	Fertitta Center (5,587); Houston, TX
December 8, 2018*; 3:00 pm, FSOK		at Oklahoma State	W 63–53	8–0	23 – Brooks	8 – Tied	9 – Robinson	Gallagher-Iba Arena (6,596); Stillwater, OK
December 12, 2018*; 8:00 pm, ESPN2	No. 24	LSU	W 82–76	9–0	18 – Robinson	9 – Brooks	6 – Robinson	Fertitta Center (7,039); Houston, TX
December 16, 2018*; 2:00 pm, ESPNU	No. 24	Saint Louis	W 68–64	10–0	17 – Davis	8 – Brooks	3 – Robinson	Fertitta Center (6,131); Houston, TX
December 20, 2018*; 7:00 pm, ESPN3	No. 21	Utah State	W 60–50	11–0	15 – Brooks	11 – Alley	4 – Robinson	Fertitta Center (6,264); Houston, TX
December 23, 2018*; 3:00 pm	No. 21	Coppin State	W 75–44	12–0	16 – Davis	8 – Brooks	5 – Robinson	Fertitta Center (5,383); Houston, TX
December 29, 2018*; 3:00 pm, ESPN3	No. 22	NJIT	W 80–59	13–0	19 – Davis	7 – Gresham	5 – Hinton	Fertitta Center (6,180); Houston, TX
AAC regular season
January 2, 2019; 7:00 pm, ESPN3	No. 19	Tulsa	W 74–56	14–0 (1–0)	21 – Davis	10 – Brooks	6 – Robinson	Fertitta Center (6,420); Houston, TX
January 6, 2019; 5:00 pm, ESPNews	No. 19	Memphis	W 90–77	15–0 (2–0)	22 – Brooks	9 – Hinton	7 – Robinson	Fertitta Center (7,039); Houston, TX
January 9, 2019; 6:00 pm, ESPNews	No. 17	at Temple	L 69–73	15–1 (2–1)	19 – Brady	6 – Robinson	4 – Jarreau	Liacouras Center (5,723); Philadelphia, PA
January 12, 2019; 7:00 pm, CBSSN	No. 17	Wichita State	W 79–70	16–1 (3–1)	20 – Davis	5 – Tied	11 – Robinson	Fertitta Center (7,039); Houston, TX
January 16, 2019; 8:00 pm, ESPNews	No. 21	at SMU	W 69–58	17–1 (4–1)	20 – Davis	5 – Tied	4 – Jarreau	Moody Coliseum (6,013); Dallas, TX
January 19, 2019; 7:00 pm, ESPNU	No. 21	at South Florida; Saturday Showcase	W 69–60	18–1 (5–1)	13 – Brady	9 – Brady	5 – Jarreau	Yuengling Center (5,563); Tampa, FL
January 23, 2019; 7:00 pm, ESPN3	No. 17	East Carolina	W 94–50	19–1 (6–1)	17 – Brooks	7 – Brady	8 – Robinson	Fertitta Center (6,297); Houston, TX
January 27, 2019; 1:00 pm, ESPNews	No. 17	at Tulsa	W 77–65	20–1 (7–1)	22 – Brooks	10 – Harris	5 – Robinson	Reynolds Center (4,023); Tulsa, OK
January 31, 2019; 6:00 pm, ESPN2	No. 13	Temple; Thursday Night Showcase	W 73–66	21–1 (8–1)	24 – Davis	12 – Jarreau	3 – Robinson	Fertitta Center (7,039); Houston, TX
February 7, 2019; 6:00 pm, CBSSN	No. 12	at UCF	W 77–68	22–1 (9–1)	26 – Davis	7 – Brooks	7 – Robinson	CFE Arena (6,292); Orlando, FL
February 10, 2019; 3:00 pm, ESPN	No. 12	No. 25 Cincinnati	W 65–58	23–1 (10–1)	16 – Tied	12 – Brooks	5 – Jarreau	Fertitta Center (7,039); Houston, TX
February 14, 2019; 6:00 pm, ESPN	No. 9	at UConn; Thursday Night Showcase	W 71–63	24–1 (11–1)	18 – Jarreau	6 – Tied	7 – Jarreau	XL Center (10,095); Hartford, CT
February 17, 2019; 1:00 pm, CBSSN	No. 9	at Tulane	W 85–50	25–1 (12–1)	26 – Davis	9 – Gresham	9 – Robinson	Devlin Fieldhouse (1,957); New Orleans, LA
February 23, 2019; 5:00 pm, ESPN2	No. 9	South Florida; Saturday Showcase	W 71–59	26–1 (13–1)	17 – Jarreau	6 – Brooks	4 – Jarreau	Fertitta Center (7,039); Houston, TX
February 27, 2019; 6:00 pm, ESPN3	No. 8	at East Carolina	W 99–65	27–1 (14–1)	26 – Davis	8 – Harris	9 – Tied	Williams Arena (4,087); Greenville, NC
March 2, 2019; 3:00 pm, ESPN	No. 8	UCF; ESPN College GameDay/Saturday Primetime	L 64–69	27–2 (14–2)	19 – Davis	9 – Brooks	2 – Tied	Fertitta Center (7,039); Houston, TX
March 7, 2019; 8:00 pm, ESPN	No. 12	SMU; Thursday Night Showcase	W 90–79	28–2 (15–2)	20 – Brooks	10 – Brooks	5 – Robinson	Fertitta Center (7,039); Houston, TX
March 10, 2019; 11:00 am, CBS	No. 12	at No. 20 Cincinnati	W 85–69	29–2 (16–2)	31 – Davis	11 – Hinton	6 – Davis	Fifth Third Arena (12,701); Cincinnati, OH
AAC Tournament
March 15, 2019; 11:00 am, ESPN2	(1) No. 11	vs. (9) UConn; Quarterfinals	W 84–45	30–2	22 – Davis	8 – Tied	5 – Robinson	FedEx Forum (7,610); Memphis, TN
March 16, 2019; 2:00 pm, ESPN2	(1) No. 11	at (5) Memphis; Semifinals	W 61–58	31–2	17 – Davis	11 – White	4 – Jarreau	FedEx Forum (7,819); Memphis, TN
March 17, 2019; 2:15 pm, ESPN	(1) No. 11	vs. (2) No. 24 Cincinnati; Championship	L 57–69	31–3	17 – Brooks	8 – Harris	4 – Jarreau	FedEx Forum (7,223); Memphis, TN
NCAA tournament
March 22, 2019*; 6:20 pm, TBS	(3 MW) No. 11	vs. (14 MW) Georgia State; First Round	W 84–55	32–3	26 – Davis	11 – White	7 – Jarreau	BOK Center (12,443); Tulsa, OK
March 24, 2019*; 7:40 pm, TNT	(3 MW) No. 11	vs. (11 MW) Ohio State; Second Round	W 74–59	33–3	21 – Davis	6 – Tied	5 – Robinson	BOK Center (12,606); Tulsa, OK
March 29, 2019*; 8:59 pm, TBS	(3 MW) No. 11	vs. (2 MW) No. 7 Kentucky; Sweet Sixteen	L 58–62	33–4	20 – Brooks	4 – White	6 – Robinson	Sprint Center (17,385); Kansas City, MO
*Non-conference game. ^{#}Rankings from AP Poll. (#) Tournament seedings in parentheses. MW=Midwest. All times are in Central Time.

== Rankings ==
Ranking movements Legend: ██ Increase in ranking ██ Decrease in ranking — = Not ranked RV = Received votes т = Tied with team above or below
	Week																				
Poll	Pre	1	2	3	4	5	6	7	8	9	10	11	12	13	14	15	16	17	18	19	Final
AP	—	—	—	—	RV	RV	24	21	22	19	17	21	17	13	12	9	9	8	12	11	Not released
Coaches	—	—	—	RV	RV	22	20	19	17	15	17–T	17	13	12	9	8	6	12	10	9	12
