= Jamarius Burton =

American basketball player (born 2000)

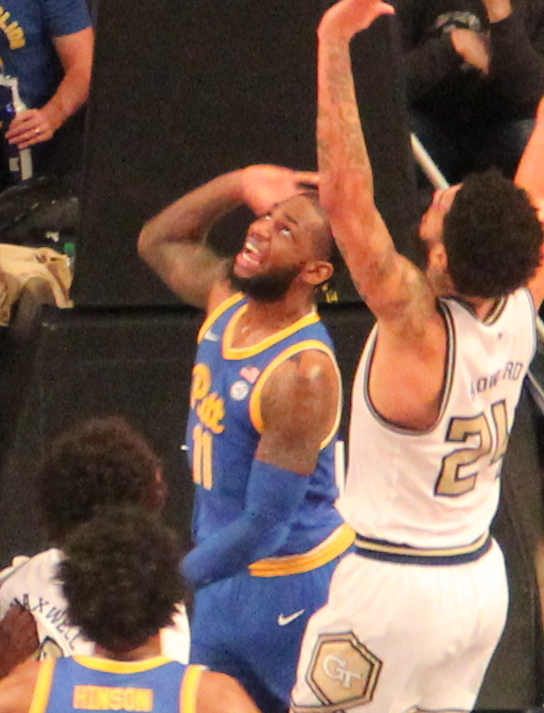
- Burton in 2023

Free Agent
- Position: Shooting guard

Personal information
- Born: April 15, 2000 (age 26) Champaign, Illinois, U.S.
- Listed height: 6 ft 4 in (1.93 m)
- Listed weight: 200 lb (91 kg)

Career information
- High school: Independence (Charlotte, North Carolina)
- College: Wichita State (2018–2020); Texas Tech (2020–2021); Pittsburgh (2021–2023)
- NBA draft: 2023: undrafted
- Playing career: 2023–present

Career history
- 2023–2024: Kortrijk Spurs

Career highlights
- First-team All-ACC (2023)

Jamarius Burton (born April 15, 2000) is an American professional basketball player who last played for the Kortrijk Spurs. He finished his collegiate career with the Pittsburgh Panthers of the Atlantic Coast Conference (ACC). He previously played for Wichita State and Texas Tech.

Burton was born in Champaign, Illinois and his family moved to Charlotte, North Carolina, where Burton starred at Independence High School before suffering an ACL injury. After recovering from his injury, he committed to Wichita State and spent his first two college seasons playing for the Shockers. Burton played two seasons at Wichita State, averaging 7.3 points, 3.4 rebounds and 3.4 assists per game. He the transferred to Texas Tech for the 2020–21 season. Burton played one season for the Red Raiders, averaging 4.3 points per game. Following the departure of his coach, Chris Beard, Burton re-entered the transfer portal.

Burton landed at Pittsburgh where, in his first season with the Panthers in 2021–22, he suffered a knee injury causing him to miss the start of the season. He averaged 12.4 points, 3.5 rebounds and 2.4 assists per game. In his second season, Burton emerged as one of the top players in the conference. He averaged 15.2 points, 4.8 rebounds and 4.3 assists per game, earning First Team All-ACC honors.
