= Riviera Schools =

Private schools in Florida, United States

Location
Riviera Private Day School
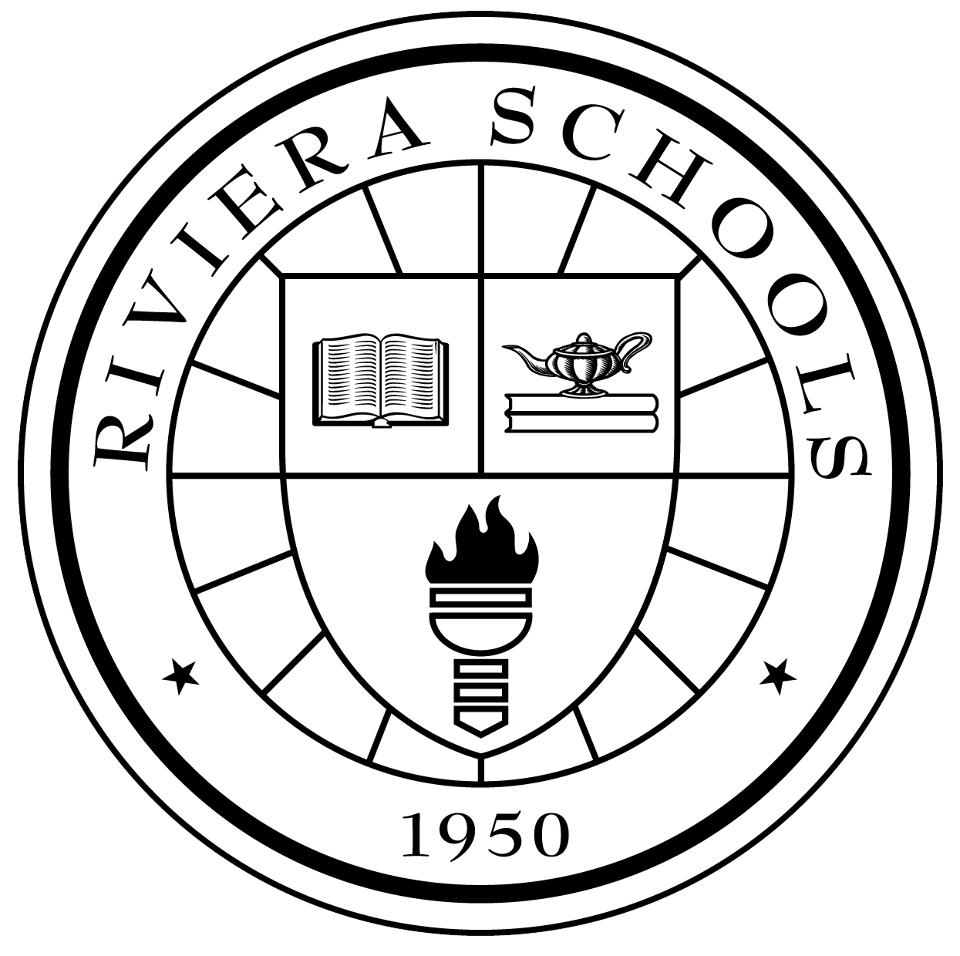
Location
- 6800 Nervia St. Coral Gables, Miami-Dade County, Florida 33146; 25°42′20″N 080°16′52″W
Information
- Grades: K-5
Riviera Preparatory School
Location
- 9775 SW 87th Ave. Miami, Miami-Dade County, Florida 33176; 25°40′47″N 080°20′04″W
Information
- Grades: 6-12
United States

Information
- School type: Private
- Religious affiliation: Non-sectarian
- Established: 1950
- Director: Lawrence H. Cohen
- Associate Director: Peter E. Cohen
- Grades: PK3-12
- Gender: Coeducational
- Enrollment: 850
- Student to teacher ratio: 9:1
- Campuses: Two campuses (Day School campus for grades PK – 5; Prep School campus for grades 6 – 12)
- Colors: Navy Blue and White
- Athletics: 38 interscholastic teams
- Mascot: Rocket the Bulldog
- Team name: Bulldogs
- Accreditation: Southern Association of Colleges and Schools, Middle States Association of Colleges and Schools, Association of Independent Schools of Florida, National Independent Private Schools Association, National Council for Private School Accreditation, Accreditation International
- Website: http://www.rivieraschools.com/

Riviera Schools is a private, independent school with two separate campuses, both in Miami-Dade County, Florida. It is composed of Riviera Day School and Riviera Preparatory School, with the campuses located under 4 miles (6.4 km) apart. The co-educational, college preparatory school serves students from pre-school through 12th grade.

The elementary school is in Coral Gables, Florida, while the secondary school is in Kendall.

== Campuses ==
=== Riviera Private Day School - Preschool through Grade 5 ===
Established in 1950, Riviera Day School is the oldest independent school originally established in Coral Gables. Each preschool classroom is focused on learning in conjunction with development, and each classroom includes one teacher and two full-time teacher's aides.

Riviera Day School provides a broad-based curriculum of language arts, mathematics, science, and social studies for elementary age students. Elementary students at Riviera learn through specialized programs, such as phonics-based English learning, STEM classes, and Spanish lessons at the start of preschool.

=== Riviera Preparatory School - Grades 6 through 12 ===
Riviera Preparatory School serves students in middle and high school. In 2011, Riviera opened a new campus for the Prep School students with approximately 100,000square feet of facilities spread out over more than 13 acres. The campus includes a media center, auditorium, dance studio, gymnasium, weight room, fine arts wing, science labs, multi-purpose fields, and an aquatics center. Courses are leveled according to student ability, and students begin pursuing elective coursework in sixth grade.

== Student organizations, athletics, and honor societies ==
Riviera offers a variety of academic and cultural honor societies. As of 2017, the school offers 10 different honor societies that recognize individuality and success in certain fields.

In addition to academics, Riviera allows students in preschool through fifth grade to choose from a wide array of activities at the elementary level, including ceramics, copper enameling, music and voice lessons, drama, ballet, flamenco, contemporary dance, yoga, tennis, and intramural sports.

Riviera currently offers 37 sports teams for its students, including basketball, volleyball, soccer, lacrosse, swimming, water polo, baseball, dance, cheerleading, golf, water polo, cross country, and tennis.

== Demographics ==
In 2022, ProPublica reported the student body was 71.1% White and 4.2% Black, while the local school district was 6.9% White and 20.4% Black.
