= Pazienza =

Pazienza is an Italian surname.

== Notable people ==
=== Artists ===
- Andrea Pazienza, an Italian Comic Book Artist.

=== Sports ===
- Michele Pazienza, an Italian Footballer.
- Vinny Pazienza, a former Italian American boxer.

=== Music ===
- Vinnie Paz, an Italian American Rapper.

=== Other ===
- Chez Pazienza (1969–2017), American journalist, author, television producer and media consultant
- Francesco Pazienza (1946–2025), Italian militant and businessman
