= Noble Academy =

Noble Academy may refer to:

- Noble Academy Cleveland, a public charter school in Ohio
- Noble Academy (Chicago), a public charter four-year high school
- Noble Academy (Greensboro, North Carolina), an independent day school
