= Winter Haven Christian School =

Coordinates: 28°2′24″N 81°41′34″W

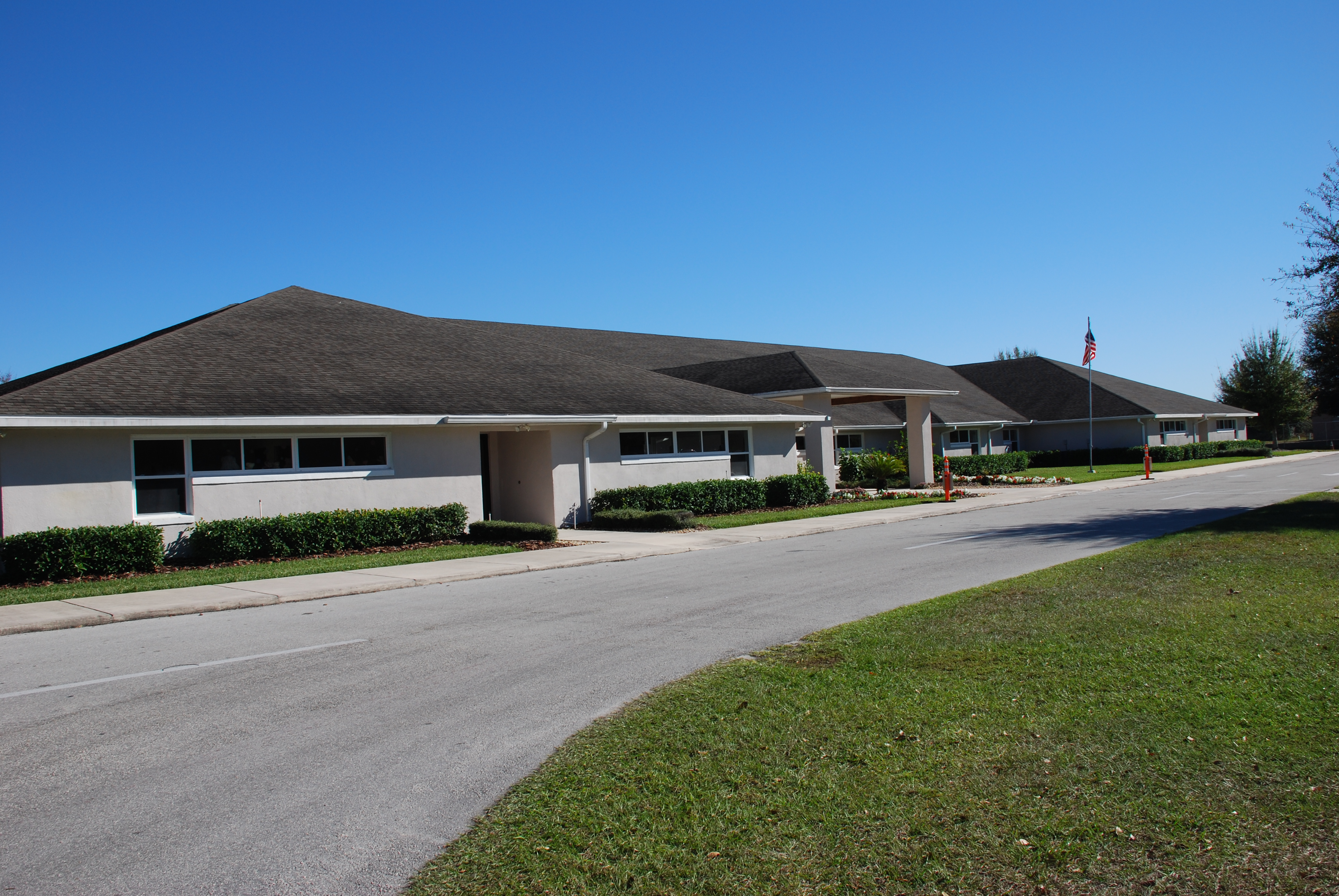
- Winter Haven Christian School campus in 2008

Location
- 1700 Buckeye Loop Road NE, Winter Haven, Florida, 33881

Information
- Type: Christian
- Established: 1965
- Headmaster: Mr. Joseph T. Klein
- Staff: 48
- Enrollment: 421 (2020-2021)
- Accreditation: Southern Association of Colleges and Schools; Middle States Association of Colleges and Schools; Florida Association of Christian Colleges and Schools (FACCS); National Council for Private School Accreditation (NCPSA)
- Website: http://www.whcsonline.org/

Winter Haven Christian School (WHCS) is a private Christian school located at 1700 Buckeye Loop Road NE in the City of Winter Haven, Florida. The school currently serves grades pre-kindergarten three-year-olds through twelfth grade.

The school was established in 1965 as First Baptist Christian Day School and received its current name in 1986.
