= LCPS =

The abbreviation LCPS may refer to:

- Las Cruces Public Schools, a school district
- Liberty Christian Preparatory School, in Florida
- Loudoun County Public Schools, a school district
- Lowndes County Public Schools (Alabama), a school district
