= Arlington Country Day School =

Coordinates: 30.366148°N 81.6036945°W

- Jacksonville, Florida, Florida; United States

Information
- Type: Private school
- Established: 1954
- Closed: January 26, 2018
- Principal: Deborah A. Condit
- Faculty: 30
- Grades: K–12
- Enrollment: 350
- Campus: Suburban
- Colors: Green, White
- Mascot: Apache
- Website: Official site

Arlington Country Day School (ACDS) was a private school in Jacksonville, Florida. A non-sectarian coeducational school, it offered a K-12 education and enrolled over 400 students a year. It was notable for its successful boys' basketball program. On January 26, 2018, the school closed its doors without warning and informed parents Saturday January 27, 2018, that it shut down.

== History ==
Arlington Country Day School opened its doors as a private, coeducational elementary school, serving students from kindergarten through the eighth grade in 1954. It was located on a small suburban campus in Jacksonville's Arlington neighborhood. It received full accreditation from the Florida Council of Independent Schools in 1968.

In 1990, Fred H. Lichtward became an owner and headmaster of the school, and pushed to expand it into a full K-12 school. In 1991 a full middle school was added. In 1995 it began the establishment of a high school, offering two academic programs. The school added another grade each year as students moved up, and it graduated its first high school class in 1999. In 2003 it received its first full high school accreditation from the Southern Association of Colleges and Schools, the National Independent Private Schools Association, and the Association of Independent Schools of Florida. In 1995 the school also added its boys' basketball program.

Arlington Country Day School was fined by the Florida High School Athletic Association (FHSAA) for recruitment violations, including a $1,000 fine in 2000 and record $33,000 fine in 2002. In 2010 the school announced it would withdraw from the FHSAA.

Arlington Country Day School was a member of the Southern Association of Colleges and Schools (SACS), Accreditation International (AI) and the National Council for Private School Accreditation (NCPSA). ACDS also joined the Sunshine Independent Athletic Association (SIAA) in 2010 to allow for more flexibility than the FHSAA could offer. Arlington Country Day School's enrollment had grown steadily over the years, and in 2010, the school expanded its student body by adding an international boarding component that draws students from around the world.

On January 26, 2018, the school closed its doors without warning and informed parents Saturday January 27, 2018, that it shut down.

== Athletics ==
ACDS had many sports programs. Its most notable is the boys' varsity basketball team, which has been called "one of the most celebrated programs in the country". The team won the Florida state Class 2A championship in 2005. ACDS repeated the championship in 2006, with a convincing 73–37 win over North Palm Beach Benjamin in a game played at the Lakeland Center. Again in 2007, the team defeated Port St. Lucie, 72–43, to three-peat. In March 2008, a four-peat was accomplished with ACDS again winning the state Class 2A title, beating Weston Sagemont, 54–53. The next season they again won the Class 2A state championship. They are only 1 of 2 teams to ever win 5 consecutive titles. The boys' basketball team appeared on national television and often traveled around the country to play. Jason Bennett, a 7'3" center, agreed in December 2006 to play for Kansas State University.

Arlington Country Day School finished eighth in the country in the USA Today 2005 boys' basketball rankings, one of only eight schools to be ranked in the top 25 for the entire season. The 2006 team finished the season ranked 14th nationwide by USA Today.

In 2000 and 2001, the ACDS baseball team won back-to-back Class 1A titles, winning their second title on May 15, 2001, by defeating Archbishop Carroll High School of Miami by a final score of 10–8 in a game played at Legends Field in Tampa, Florida. On May 18, 2006, the baseball team won their third state title in six years, with a 4–2 victory over Lakeland Santa Fe Catholic.

== Notable alumni ==
- David Huertas (2005) - Professional basketball player
- Rodney McGruder (2009) - Professional basketball player, NBA
- Wally Judge (2009) - Professional basketball player
- Justin Jackson (2010) - Professional basketball player
- Javier Báez (2011) - Professional baseball player, 2x MLB All-Star
- John Brown (2011 - transferred) - Professional basketball player
- Gary Browne (2011 - transferred) - Professional basketball player
- Ian Baker (2013)- Professional basketball player
- Nikola Jovanović (2013) - Professional basketball player
- Brian Navarreto (2013) - Professional baseball catcher, MLB
- Caylin Raftopoulos (2013 - transferred) - Professional basketball player
- Ty Gadsden (2014) - Professional basketball player
- Nate Mason (2014) - Professional basketball player
- K. J. Maura (2014) - Professional basketball player
- Terrell Miller (2014) - Professional basketball player
- Brandone Francis (2015) - Professional basketball
- Koch Bar (2016) - Professional basketball player
- Fotios Malelis (2016) - Professional basketball player
- Alonzo Verge Jr. (2017 - transferred) - Professional basketball player
- Luguentz Dort (2018 - transferred) - Professional basketball player, NBA
- Chol Marial (2019 - transferred) - College basketball player
