= Ryan Jackson (infielder) =

American baseball player (born 1988)

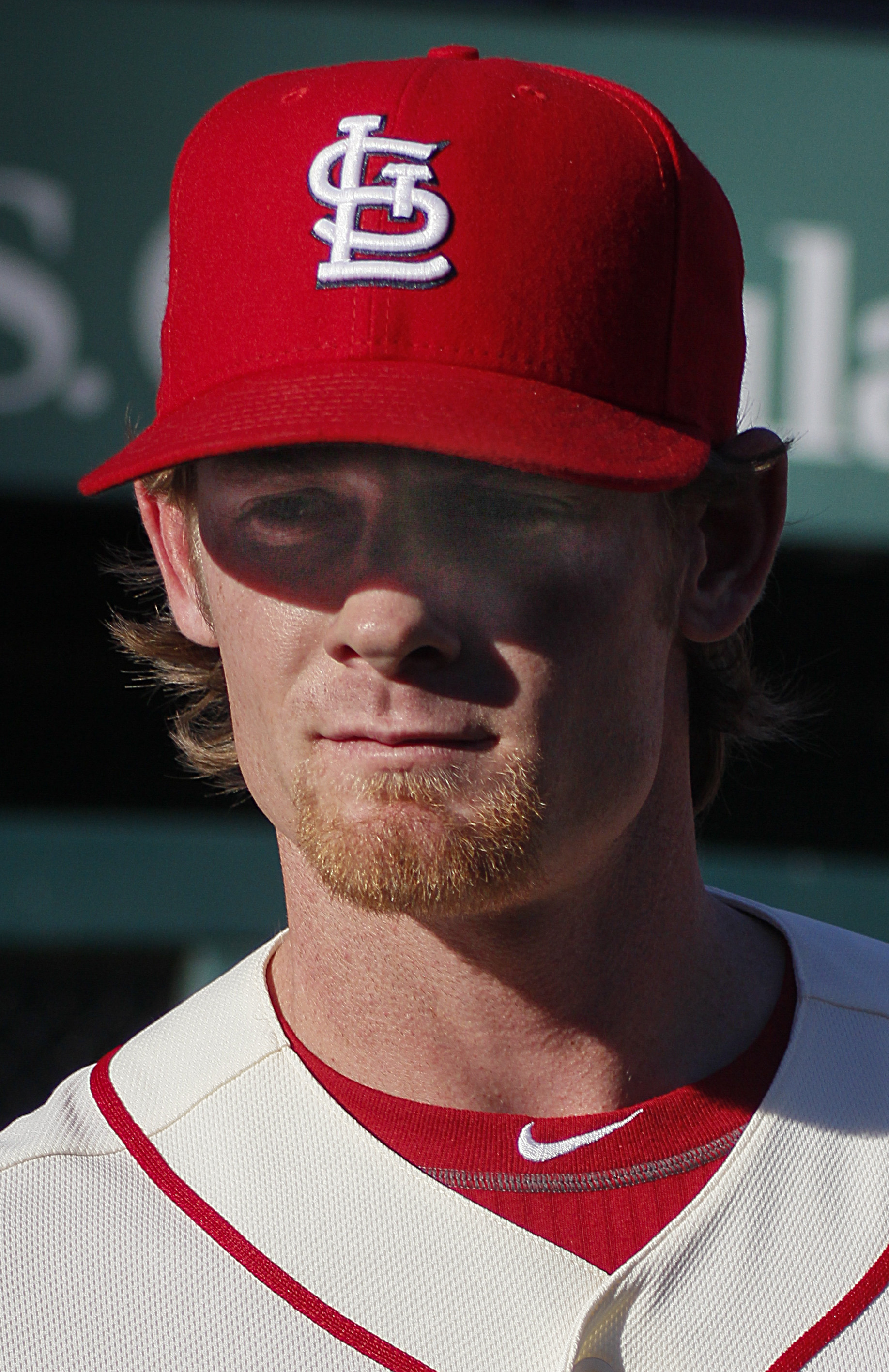
- Jackson with the St. Louis Cardinals
- Infielder
- Born: May 10, 1988 (age 38); Miami, Florida, U.S.
- Batted: Right Threw: Right

MLB debut
- August 11, 2012, for the St. Louis Cardinals

Last MLB appearance
- September 30, 2015, for the Los Angeles Angels

MLB statistics
- Batting average: .061
- Home runs: 0
- Runs batted in: 0
- Stats at Baseball Reference

Teams
- St. Louis Cardinals (2012–2013); Los Angeles Angels of Anaheim (2015)

Ryan Christopher Jackson (born May 10, 1988) is an American former professional baseball infielder. He played in Major League Baseball (MLB) for the St. Louis Cardinals and Los Angeles Angels of Anaheim. He played college baseball at the University of Miami.

== Amateur career ==
Jackson played amateur baseball for Westminster Academy, Gulliver Preparatory, Florida Christian School, and the University of Miami. In 2007, he played collegiate summer baseball with the Hyannis Mets of the Cape Cod Baseball League.

== Professional career ==
=== St. Louis Cardinals ===
Jackson was selected by the St. Louis Cardinals in the fifth round of the 2009 Major League Baseball draft. Jackson made his professional debut with the Low-A Batavia Muckdogs, and recorded a .216 average in 67 games. In 2010, Jackson split the year between the Single-A Quad Cities River Bandits and the High-A Palm Beach Cardinals, logging a .278/.359/.362 slash line with 3 home runs and 35 RBI. The following season, Jackson played for the Double-A Springfield Cardinals, batting .278/.334/.415 with career-highs in home runs (11) and RBI (73). He was assigned to the Triple-A Memphis Redbirds to begin the 2012 season.

Jackson was called up to the majors for the first time on August 10, 2012, and he made his debut the next day, as the starting second baseman against the Philadelphia Phillies, going hitless in three at-bats. His first MLB hit was a single to right field off Dallas Keuchel of the Houston Astros in a pinch-hit appearance on August 23. He had two hits in 17 at-bats that year and was hitless in seven at-bats the next year, spending most of the 2013 season in Memphis, hitting .278 with 3 home runs and 34 RBI.

=== San Diego Padres ===
On November 20, 2013, Jackson was claimed off waivers by the Houston Astros. A month later, on December 18, 2013, he was traded to the San Diego Padres in exchange for Jesús Guzmán. He played in only 11 games in 2013, split between the Arizona League Padres and the Triple-A El Paso Chihuahuas as a result of wrist surgery.

=== Kansas City Royals ===
On November 3, 2014, Jackson was claimed off waivers by the Los Angeles Dodgers, but was designated for assignment by the team on November 24. On November 26, the Dodgers traded Jackson to the Kansas City Royals in exchange for cash considerations. On December 30, Jackson was designated for assignment by the Royals. He cleared waivers and was sent outright to the Triple-A Omaha Storm Chasers on January 7, 2015. Jackson began the 2015 season with Triple-A Omaha, and hit .305/.379/.407 in 19 games.

=== Los Angeles Angels ===
On May 7, 2015, Jackson was traded to the Los Angeles Angels of Anaheim in exchange for Drew Butera. He was assigned to the Triple-A Salt Lake Bees upon his acquisition. On August 16, Jackson was selected to the active roster. In 22 games with the Angels, Jackson went 0-for-9 and walked once in 14 plate appearances. On November 9, Jackson was outrighted off of the 40-man roster and elected free agency.

=== Philadelphia Phillies ===
On November 18, 2015, Jackson signed a minor league contract with the Philadelphia Phillies organization. Jackson was assigned to the Triple-A Lehigh Valley IronPigs to begin the 2016 season and hit .214/.347/.238 with no home runs and 7 RBI in 30 games.

=== Los Angeles Angels (second stint) ===
On May 20, 2016, Jackson was traded back to the Los Angeles Angels in exchange for cash considerations. However, Jackson was released by the Angels on August 10 after posting a .262/.351/.306 slash line in 62 games with Triple-A Salt Lake.

=== Miami Marlins ===
On January 3, 2017, Jackson signed a minor league contract with the Miami Marlins organization. He was assigned to the Triple-A New Orleans Baby Cakes, and hit .262/.380/.262 in 14 games before he was released on April 24.

=== Seattle Mariners ===
After a 4-game stint with the Sugar Land Skeeters of the independent Atlantic League of Professional Baseball, on June 1, 2017, Jackson signed a minor league contract with the Seattle Mariners. Jackson played in 15 games for the Triple-A Tacoma Rainiers, hitting .229/.302/.271 before he was released on June 21.

=== Washington Nationals ===
On July 3, 2017, Jackson signed a minor league contract with the Washington Nationals organization. He played in 5 games for the Triple-A Syracuse Chiefs, going 2-for-16 (.125) before retiring from professional baseball on July 13.

=== Sugar Land Skeeters (second stint) ===
On January 22, 2018, Jackson signed with the Sugar Land Skeeters of the Atlantic League of Professional Baseball. Jackson played in only 8 games for the Skeeters in 2018, going 3-for-20 (.150) in 25 plate appearances. He re-signed with the Skeeters on May 12, 2019. Jackson was released by the team on July 25, 2019, after hitting .251/.340/.310 in 53 games.

=== New Britain Bees ===
On July 30, 2019, Jackson signed with the New Britain Bees of the Atlantic League of Professional Baseball. In 49 games with the Bees, Jackson logged a .262/.327/.314 slash line with no home runs and 19 RBI.

=== Long Island Ducks ===
Following the 2019 season, the Bees moved to the Futures Collegiate Baseball League, and Jackson was drafted by the Long Island Ducks in the Bees dispersal draft. Jackson did not play in a game for Long Island in 2020 due to the cancellation of the 2020 ALPB season because of the COVID-19 pandemic. He became a free agent after the year. On April 23, 2021, Jackson re-signed with the Ducks for the 2021 season.

=== Gastonia Honey Hunters ===
On August 27, 2021, Jackson was traded to the Gastonia Honey Hunters of the Atlantic League of Professional Baseball for future considerations. He became a free agent following the season.

=== Lexington Legends ===
On April 30, 2022, Jackson signed with the Lexington Legends of the Atlantic League of Professional Baseball. During a game on May 4, he faced Staten Island FerryHawks pitcher Kelsie Whitmore during her pitching debut as the first woman to pitch in the Atlantic League; Jackson flew out to right field on the fourth pitch after watching the first three. He appeared in 28 games for Lexington in 2022, hitting .196/.315/.283 with two home runs and 7 RBI. Jackson was released by the Legends on June 17.
