= Florida Association of Christian Colleges and Schools =

American organization based in Florida

The Florida Association of Christian Colleges and Schools (FACCS) is an organization that accredits Florida's Christian schools. It holds teachers conventions and annual competitions for its member schools. It is a member of the National Council for Private School Accreditation and is recognized by the Florida Association of Academic Nonpublic Schools.

== Member Schools ==
School	City	County	Enrollment	Level
Pensacola Christian Academy	Pensacola	Escambia	2,536	Accredited
The King's Academy	West Palm Beach	Palm Beach	1,821	Co-accredited
Trinity Christian Academy	Jacksonville	Duval	1,531	Co-accredited
Evangelical Christian School	Fort Myers	Lee	1,368	Co-accredited
Florida Christian School	Miami	Miami-Dade	1,171	Co-accredited
Atlantic Christian Academy of the Palm Beaches	West Palm Beach	Palm Beach	1,013	Accredited
Rocky Bayou Christian School	Niceville	Okaloosa	924	Co-accredited
Morningside Academy	Port St Lucie	St. Lucie	808	Co-accredited
West Florida Baptist Academy	Milton	Miami-Dade	717	Accredited
Orlando Christian Prep	Orlando	Orange	681	Co-accredited
Dade Christian School	Miami	Miami-Dade	655	Co-accredited
First Coast Christian School	Jacksonville	Duval	643	Co-accredited
North Florida Christian School	Tallahassee	Leon	632	Co-accredited
Grace Christian School	Brandon	Hillsborough	631	Participant
Westwood Christian School	Miami	Miami-Dade	599	Co-accredited
Highlands Christian Academy	Pompano Beach	Broward	588	Co-accredited
Ocala Christian Academy	Ocala	Marion	573	Accredited
Horeb Christian School	Hialeah	Miami-Dade	536	Accredited
First Baptist Christian Academy of Palm Coast	Bunnell	Flagler	532	Accredited
Marcus Pointe Christian School	Pensacola	Escambia	515	Participant
Woodland Early Childhood Center	Bradenton	Manatee	502	Accredited
Liberty Christian Preparatory School	Tavares	Lake	492	Accredited
Turning Point Christian Academy	St. Augustine	St. Johns	468	Accredited
Winter Haven Christian School	Winter Haven	Polk	460	Co-accredited
Parsons Christian Academy	Jacksonville	Duval	449	Accredited
Southland Christian	Kissimmee	Osceola	429	Participant
Parkway Christian Academy	Lakeland	Polk	424	Participant
Warner Christian Academy	South Daytona	Volusia	420	Co-accredited
Altamonte Christian School	Altamonte Springs	Seminole	418	Co-accredited
First Baptist Ruskin Christian School	Ruskin	Hillsborough	382	Accredited
Kingsway Christian Academy	Orlando	Orange	374	Participant
Spring Hill Christian Academy	Spring Hill	Hernando	368	Accredited
Colonial Christian School	Homestead	Miami-Dade	357	Accredited
Christ Fellowship Academy	Miami	Miami-Dade	346	Accredited
The Potter's House Christian Academy	Jacksonville	Duval	337	Co-accredited
Clewiston Christian School	Clewiston	Hendry	319	Co-accredited
Wakulla Christian School	Crawfordville	Wakulla	319	Accredited
Rainbow Christian Academy	Miami	Miami-Dade	317	Co-accredited
Eagle's View Academy	Jacksonville	Duval	312	Accredited
Cornerstone Christian School	Jacksonville	Duval	299	Participant
Calvary Christian Academy and Preschool	Fort Walton Beach	Okaloosa	288	Co-accredited
NFC Academy	Tallahassee	Leon	282	Co-accredited
Hampden DuBose Academy	Zellwood	Orange	281	Participant
Hillsborough Baptist School	Seffner	Hillsborough	271	Participant
First United Methodist Christian School	Homestead	Miami-Dade	270	Accredited
Eastland Christian School	Orlando	Orange	265	Accredited
Landmark Christian School	Haines City	Polk	264	Accredited
Glendale Christian School	Vero Beach	Indian River	262	Participant
Kingdom Academy	Miami	Miami-Dade	261	Participant
Bethany Christian School	West Melbourne	Brevard	260	Accredited
Cinco Christian School	Fort Walton Beach	Okaloosa	254	Participant
Hobe Sound Christian Academy	Hobe Sound	Martin	237	Co-accredited
Baymeadows Baptist Dayschool	Jacksonville	Duval	235	Accredited
Gladeview Christian School	Miami	Miami-Dade	235	Accredited
Peniel Baptist Academy	Palatka	Putnam	234	Co-accredited
First Baptist Academy	Cooper City	Broward	224	Accredited
Elfers Christian School	New Port Richey	Pasco	222	Participant
Cedar Hills Baptist Christian School	Jacksonville	Duval	215	Participant
Regency Christian Academy	Orlando	Orange	214	Participant
Brush Arbor Christian	Orlando	Orange	206	Accredited
Inverness Christian Academy	Inverness	Citrus	206	Accredited
Grace Christian Schools of Pasco	Hudson	Pasco	182	Participant
Community Christian Academy	Stuart	Martin	179	Accredited
Glades Christian Academy	Coral Springs	Broward	179	Participant
Classical Christian Academy	North Fort Myers	Lee	173	Participant
Stetson Baptist Christian School	DeLand	Volusia	173	Accredited
King's Christian School	Miami	Miami-Dade	165	Accredited
Calusa Preparatory School	Miami	Miami-Dade	162	Participant
Gunnery Road Christian Academy	Lehigh Acres	Lee	159	Accredited
Corinth Christian Academy	Jennings	Hamilton	158	Participant
Victory Christian Academy	Orlando	Orange	157	Participant
Rocky Bayou Christian School - Crestview	Crestview	Okaloosa	151	Participant
Cutler Ridge Christian Academy	Miami	Miami-Dade	148	Accredited
Palm Beach Christian Academy Lake Park	Lake Park	Palm Beach	131	Accredited
WEE World Child Development Center	Palmetto	Manatee	117	Accredited
"Kids Kampus of Cala Hills, Inc."	Ocala	Marion	116	Accredited
Victory Christian Academy	Ocoee	Orange	108	Participant
Plantation Baptist Christian School	Plantation	Broward	100	Participant
R.J. Hendley Christian Community School	Riviera Beach	Palm Beach	100	Participant
Paideia Classical Christian School	Tampa	Hillsborough	98	Participant
Faith Christian Academy	Spring Hill	Hernando	94	Participant
Wee Care Daycare at First Baptist Church of Dundee	Dundee	Polk	93	Participant
Astatula Christian School	Astatula	Lake	90	Participant
The Master's Academy	Southwest Ranches	Broward	87	Accredited
Raintree Christian Academy	New Port Richey	Pasco	85	Participant
Englewood Christian School	Englewood	Sarasota	73	Participant
Dr. D. D. Brown Christian Academy of Hope	Ocala	Marion	64	Participant
East Pointe Christian Academy	Jacksonville	Duval	64	Accredited
Elfers Christian Preschool	New Port Richey	Pasco	62	Accredited
First Baptist Christian School	Apalachicola	Franklin	62	Participant
A Little Schoolhouse Christian Academy	Parrish	Manatee	58	Accredited
First Baptist Destin Preschool	Destin	Okaloosa	58	Participant
Millennial Christian School	Jacksonville	Duval	50	Participant
St. Cloud Christian Academy	St. Cloud	Osceola	41	Participant
Ebenezer Christian School	Florida City	Miami-Dade	40	Participant
RJB Christian School	Orlando	Orange	39	Participant
King's Kids of First Baptist Church Palmetto	Palmetto	Manatee	29	Participant
Edgewood Children's Ranch Academy	Orlando	Orange	0	Participant
Inspiration Academy	Bradenton	Manatee	0	Participant
Lighthouse Ministry	Miami	Miami-Dade	0	Participant

== See also ==
- Dade Christian School
- King's Academy, The
- North Florida Christian High School
- Pensacola Christian Academy
- Winter Haven Christian School
