= Florida Christian School =

Private Christian school in Miami, Florida, United States

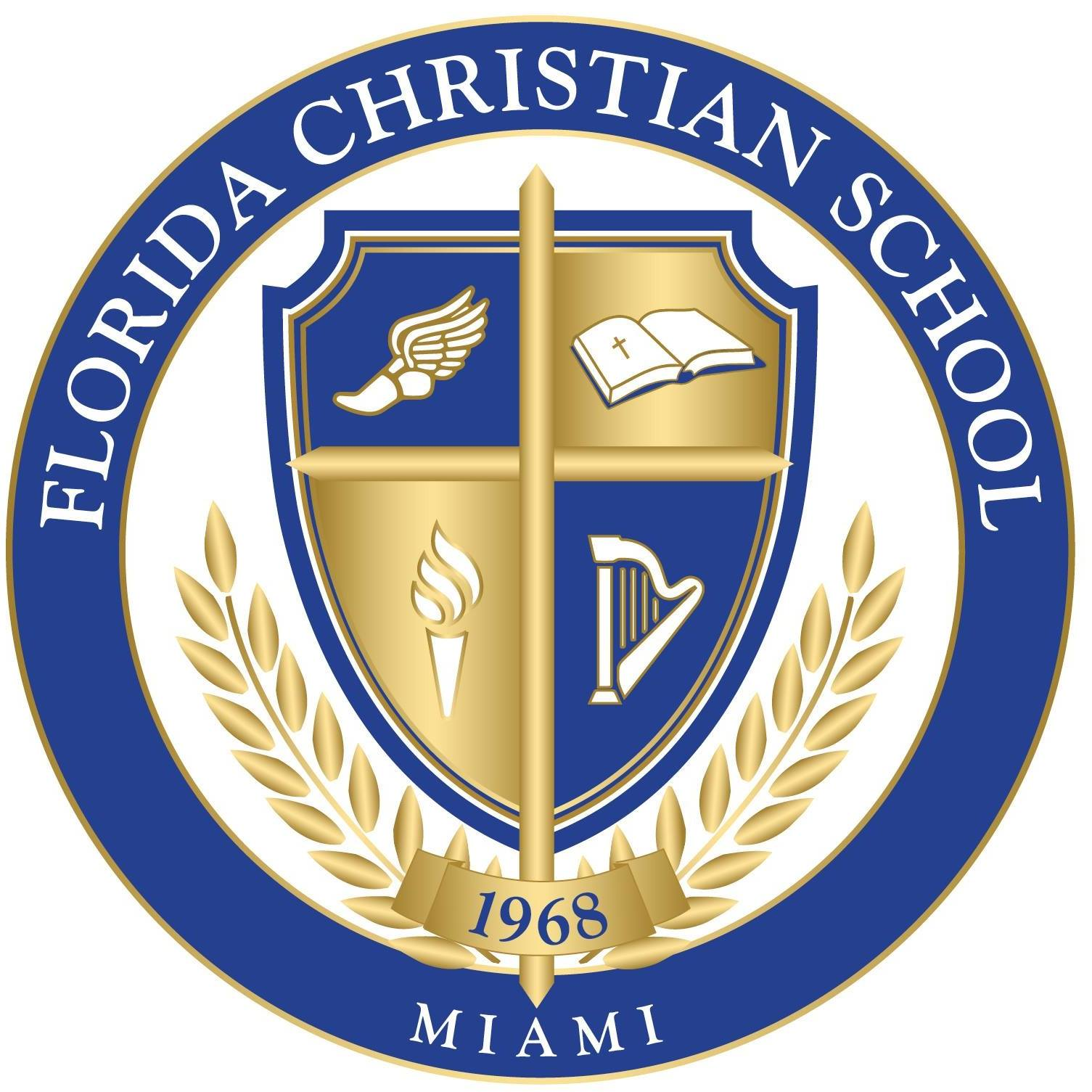

Location
- 4200 SW 89th Avenue; Miami, Florida; United States; 25.73°N 80.3436111°W

Information
- Type: Private Christian
- Motto: Faith. Character. Success.
- Established: 1969
- Principal: David King
- Headmaster: Dr. Jason Harrison
- Officer in charge: George Gulla
- Chaplain: Alberto Hernandez
- Grades: K2–12
- Gender: Co-educational
- Enrollment: 1,115 (2015-16)
- Campus size: 18 Acres
- Campus type: Suburban
- Colors: Red, White and Blue
- Mascot: Patriot
- Nickname: Pats
- Accreditations: SACS; FACCS; AACS
- Website: www.floridachristian.org

Florida Christian School is a private, non-denominational Christian school in Olympia Heights, in unincorporated Miami-Dade County, Florida, U.S. The school offers co-ed classes from preschool through high school. Current enrollment exceeds 1,000 students.

== History ==
Florida Christian School was founded in June 1968 as a Christian academy, at the time Dade County schools were integrating. In 2016, school enrollment was predominantly Hispanic, with twelve African American students (1%).

The school offers bulletproof inserts for student backpacks. In the event of an active shooter situation, students are instructed to wear backpacks covering their chests.

== Accreditation ==
Florida Christian School is accredited by the Southern Association of Colleges and Schools (SACS), the Florida Association of Christian Colleges and Schools (FACCS) and the American Association of Christian Schools (AACS).

== Athletics ==
- Florida AA State baseball champions in 2004 and 2005
- Florida AA State boys basketball champions in 1996

== Notable alumni ==
- Octavio De La Grana, basketball coach
- Ryan Jackson, Major League Baseball shortstop
- Andre Wadsworth, NFL player
- Jennifer Rothschild, author and speaker
- Mike Ryan Ruiz, Sports Media Personality, Dan Lebatard Show With Stugotz
