= Constantin Ritzmann =

German gridiron football player (born 1979)

No. 93
- Position: Defensive end

Personal information
- Born: December 20, 1979 (age 46); Freiburg, West Germany
- Listed height: 6 ft 4 in (1.93 m)
- Listed weight: 265 lb (120 kg)

Career information
- High school: Tallahassee (FL) N. Florida Christian
- College: Tennessee
- NFL draft: 2004: undrafted

Career history
- Buffalo Bills (2004-2005); Atlanta Falcons (2005)

Awards and highlights
- 3× NFL Global Junior Championship MVP (I, II, III)
- Stats at Pro Football Reference

Constantin Ritzmann (born December 20, 1979) is a German-born player of American football.

== Early life ==
He was born in Freiburg, Germany. He moved from Berlin, Germany to Tallahassee, Florida in hopes of achieving success in American football. As a high school senior he was offered a scholarship from multiple D1 football powerhouses, including the University of Florida, Florida State, Alabama, Tennessee, Ohio State and many more.

He ended up choosing Tennessee over Florida State in 1998.

== College career ==
At Tennessee, he played as a true freshman. He became a starter midway through his junior season and a team captain as a senior in 2003. He led the Tennessee Volunteers to an upset victory over then number 4 Miami which ended the nation's longest home winning streak.

== Professional career ==
Constantin was signed by the Buffalo Bills in 2004 as an undrafted defensive end. He made the opening day roster. He was the first German-born non-kicker to appear on an NFL opening day roster.

During the 2005 season he was activated by the Atlanta Falcons and played in the loss to the Tampa Bay Buccaneers.

He finished his football career in 2007 with the Berlin Thunder of the NFL Europa.
