= Liberty Christian Preparatory School =

Location
- 2451 Dora Avenue; Tavares, Florida; 32778; United States; 28°49′09″N 81°42′10″W

Information
- Former name: Liberty Christian Academy
- Type: Private, day, christian, college preparatory
- Motto: Prepare, Engage, Succeed
- Religious affiliation: Liberty Baptist Church
- Denomination: Christian
- Established: 1 November 1983
- Head teacher: Jeremy Thomas
- Staff: 7
- Faculty: 28
- Grades: K–12
- Gender: Co-educational
- Enrollment: 500
- Campus type: Suburban
- Colors: Green & Gold
- Mascot: Lion
- Nickname: Lions
- Accreditations: Florida Association of Christian Colleges and Schools, National Council for Private School Accreditation, Middle States Association-Commission on Elementary and Secondary Schools
- School fees: Application: $50; Enrollment: $300
- Tuition: (K-5): $9,100 (6–12): $9,435
- Website: www.libertychristianprep.com

Liberty Christian Preparatory School (LCPS) is a private Christian school in Tavares, Florida, United States, run by neighboring Liberty Baptist Church. Founded in 1983, it educates approximately 500 students in kindergarten through 12th grade. After a 2002 expansion, it changed to its current name from Liberty Christian Academy, reflecting the upgrade of its curriculum to a college-preparatory program accredited by the Florida Association of Christian Colleges and Schools, the National Council for Private School Accreditation and the Middle States Association-Commission on Elementary and Secondary Schools.

== History ==
The school began informally as a daycare for the young children of congregants attending services shortly after Liberty Baptist built its first building on its present property along County Road 19A on the isthmus between lakes Eustis and Dora, in 1978. A two-story building was built for the school in 1982 after parents expressed a wish for a full school program. At some time around then it acquired the name Liberty Christian Academy, before formally becoming certified by the American Association of Christian Schools in late 1983. In 1999 the main building was built, housing the gym and auditorium.

== Overview ==
Most graduates attend college, primarily in Florida and nearby Southeastern states. The school has a student–teacher ratio of 16:1 and reports that 36 percent of its students are members of minorities.

== Athletics ==
Since its founding, LCPS has maintained athletic programs and fielded teams that compete as the Lions (formerly the Eagles). In 2023, it competed in eight-man football for the first time; many of the players had never played tackle football before. After some difficult losses early in the season, the team won the Sunshine State Athletic Association AAAA championship.

== Controversies ==
LCPS gained national attention in 2024 after it barred Michelle Cline, a mother of two students from driving her minivan onto the property to pick up and drop off her children unless she removed a large rear window decal advertising the OnlyFans channel she operated with her husband, which she refused to do (Note: The school claimed her response was to put up an even larger decal with a smaller sticker referencing its objections. Cline says that decal was on a pickup truck which she and her husband stopped using after its engine blew earlier that school year.) since she had already been doing so for some time without any complaint from the school. She chose instead to park the vehicle at an assisted living center across the street at the beginning and end of the school day. Several weeks later, the school expelled her children, (Note: In 2021, a Catholic school in California also expelled three students after their mother's OnlyFans was discovered by other parents, some of whom then demanded the expulsion.) all six children of a woman who had complained about the decal on TikTok, and another student who had viewed the mother's channel from school on his phone. LCPS offered to re-enroll both women's children if they removed all their offending online content, but they refused.

== Notable alumni ==
- Tacko Fall (class of 2015), professional basketball player

== See also ==
- List of Baptist schools in the United States
