= Tacko Fall =

Senegalese basketball player (born 1995)

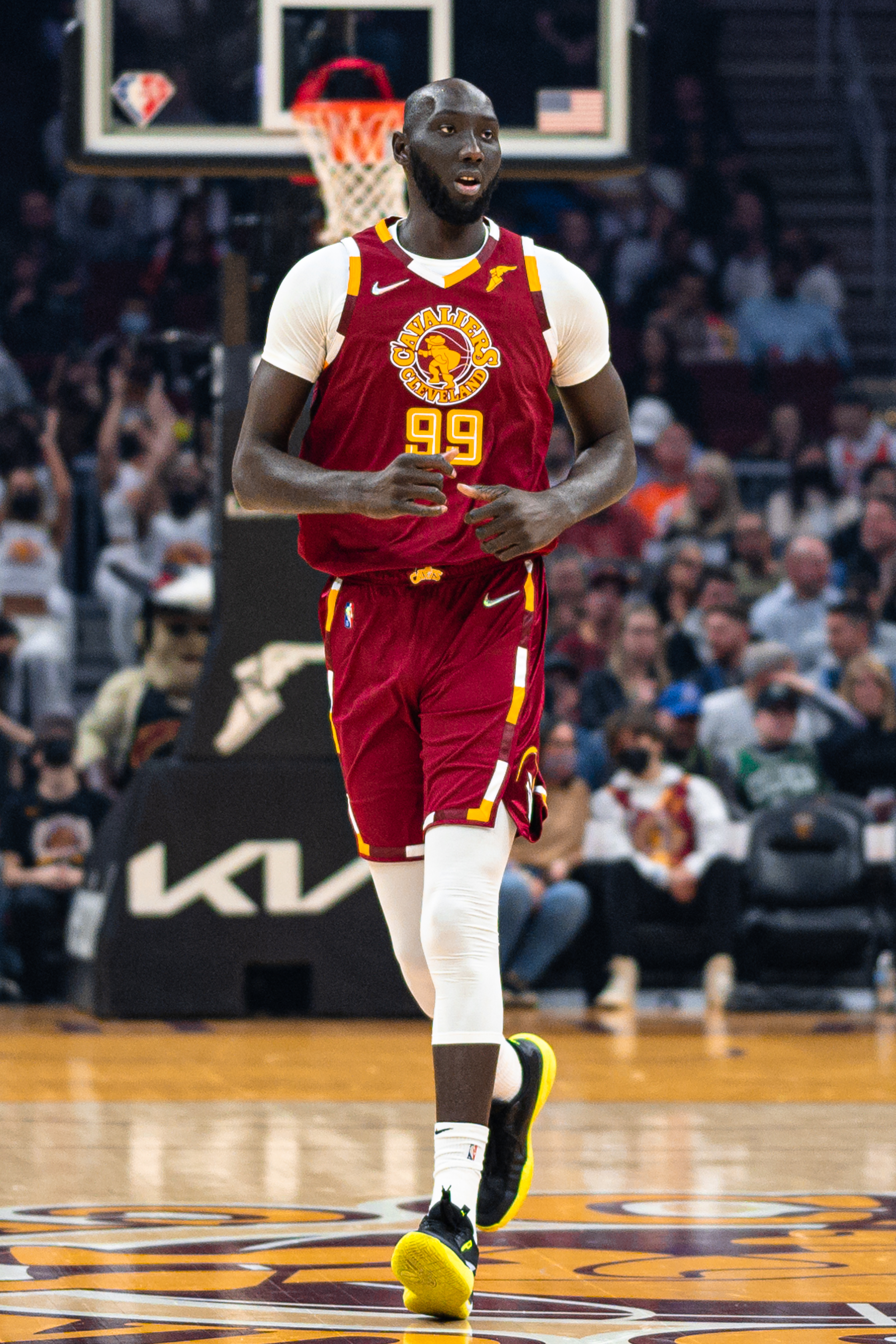
- Fall with the Cleveland Cavaliers in 2021

No. 99 – Philadelphia 76ers
- Position: Center
- League: NBA

Personal information
- Born: 10 December 1995 (age 30) Dakar, Senegal
- Listed height: 7 ft 6 in (2.29 m)
- Listed weight: 311 lb (141 kg)

Career information
- High school: Jamie's House Charter School (Houston, Texas, U.S.); Liberty Christian Prep (Tavares, Florida, U.S.)
- College: UCF (2015–2019)
- NBA draft: 2019: undrafted
- Playing career: 2019–present

Career history
- 2019–2021: Boston Celtics
- 2019–2020: →Maine Red Claws
- 2021–2022: Cleveland Cavaliers
- 2021–2022: →Cleveland Charge
- 2022–2023: Xinjiang Flying Tigers
- 2023–2024: Nanjing Monkey Kings
- 2024–2025: New Zealand Breakers
- 2025: Nanjing Monkey Kings
- 2025–2026: Ningbo Rockets
- 2026–present: Philadelphia 76ers
- 2026–present: →Delaware Blue Coats

Career highlights
- 2× CBA blocks leader (2023, 2026); 2× NBA G League All-Defensive Team (2020, 2022); NBA G League blocks leader (2022); Third-team All-AAC (2019); AAC Defensive Player of the Year (2017)
- Stats at NBA.com
- Stats at Basketball Reference

El Hadji Tacko Sereigne Diop Fall (born 10 December 1995) is a Senegalese professional basketball player for the Philadelphia 76ers of the National Basketball Association (NBA), on a two-way contract with the Delaware Blue Coats of the NBA G League. He played college basketball for the UCF Knights. Fall has made the NBA G League All-Defensive Team in 2020 and 2022, leading the G League in blocks in the latter year.

At 7 ft 6 in (2.29 m), Fall is one of the tallest NBA players and is one of the tallest living humans. At the 2019 NBA Draft Combine, his measurements set all-time NBA records for tallest height in shoes (7 ft 7 in; 2.31 m), longest wingspan (8 ft 2.25 in; 250 cm), and highest standing reach (10 ft 2.5 in; 3.11 m). The NBA now lists players' heights without shoes, so Fall is listed at 7 ft 6 in (2.29 m).

== Early life ==
Fall was born and raised in Dakar, Senegal. In 2011, Senegalese basketball coach Ibrahima N'Diaye, the brother of former NBA player Mamadou N'Diaye, heard from a friend about an exceptionally tall teenager that he had seen playing with friends in a local street. After identifying him, they visited the 15-year-old Fall—who already stood 7 ft 3 in (2.21 m) tall—at his home and persuaded Fall's mother, Marianne Diop Sene, to allow Fall to start attending N'Diaye's basketball academy. Fall moved to the United States at age 16. He first played organized basketball in Houston, Texas, and trained with NBA Hall-of-Famer Hakeem Olajuwon.

Fall was listed as 7 ft 6 in (2.29 m) and was purportedly still growing around his senior year, making him the tallest high-school basketball player in the country while he played for Jamie's House Charter and Liberty Christian Prep.

Due to his height and reach, Fall received interest from many college basketball programs throughout the nation. He first played for Jamie's House Charter School in Houston, where his team won the state championship. Fall played with ISTI all-stars summer travel team and for Each 1 Teach 1 on the Nike Elite Youth Basketball League (EYBL) circuit where he played alongside fellow class of 2015 recruits Antonio Blakeney and Ben Simmons. Fall also played in several NCAA certified events, including the NBPA Top 100 Camp in Virginia. He then attended Liberty Christian Preparatory School in Tavares, Florida. As a senior in 2015, Fall averaged 20 points, 15 rebounds, and 5.1 blocks per game. Rated as a four-star and three-star recruit in the 2015 high-school class, nearly 40 different schools expressed interest in him. Fall committed to the University of Central Florida in Orlando, who officially signed him on 28 October 2014. Fall played with the UCF Knights under head coach Donnie Jones.

== College career ==
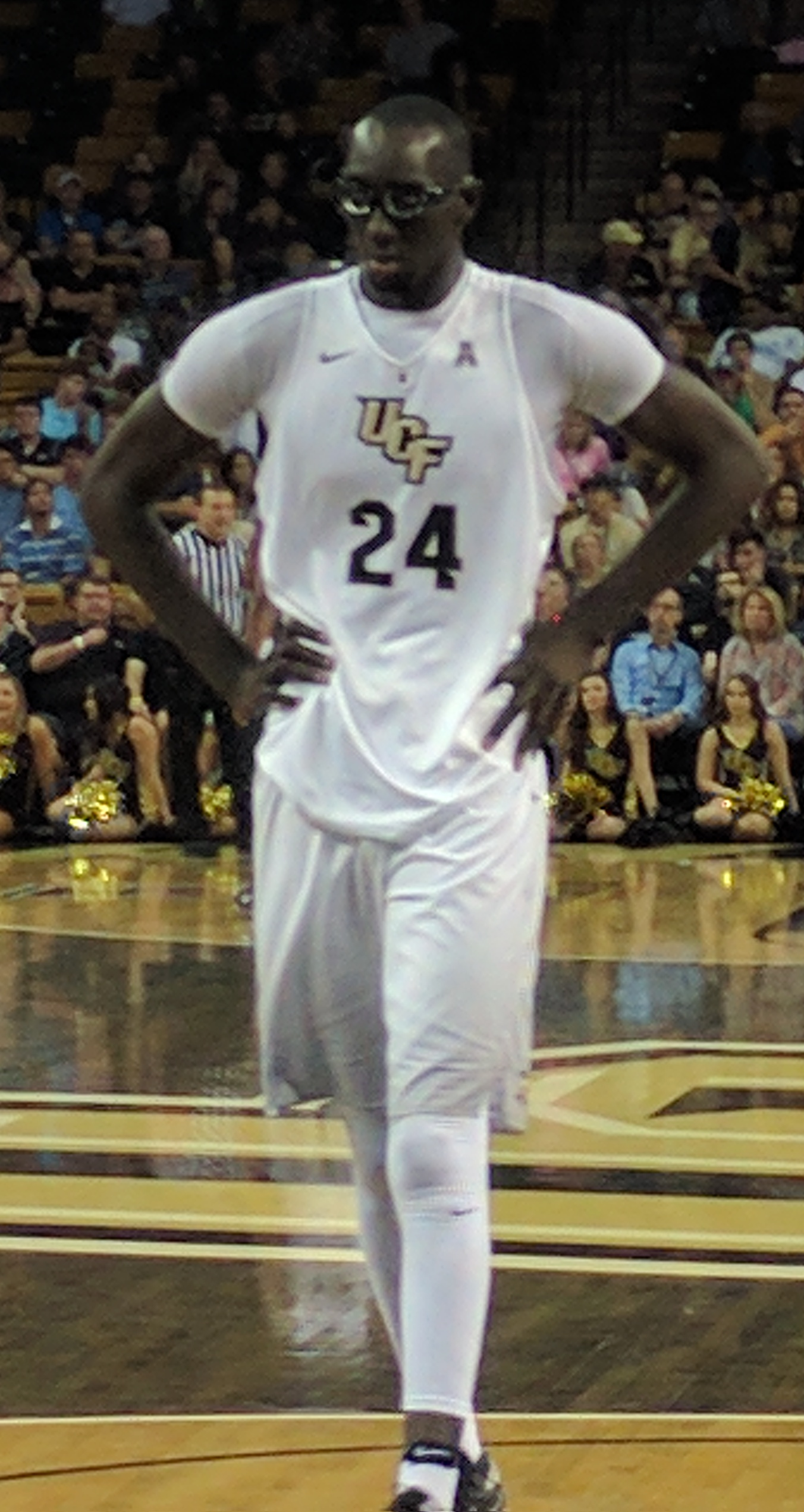
Fall at UCF in 2017

Fall played college basketball for the UCF Knights. As a freshman during the 2015–16 season, he faced fellow Senegalese center Mamadou N'Diaye, who stands at 7 ft 6 in (2.29 m), in the tallest tip-off and match-up in U.S. college basketball history in a game against the UC Irvine Anteaters.

As a sophomore in 2016–17, Fall was named American Athletic Conference Defensive Player of the Year. He ranked second nationally in field-goal percentage as of January 2017.

On 5 April 2017, Fall declared for the 2017 NBA draft, with the possibility of returning to Central Florida still available to him before the end of the draft lottery that year. On 24 May, Fall withdrew his name from consideration for the NBA draft, to return to UCF for his junior year. During his junior year, Fall injured his shoulder, causing him to play in only 16 games, totaling 351 minutes.

During his senior season, Fall helped lead the Knights to the 2019 NCAA tournament and secured their first victory in program history with a win over the VCU Rams. In his final game, Fall recorded 15 points and six rebounds in a 77–76 loss to the Duke Blue Devils.

== Professional career ==
After the conclusion of his senior year, Fall was named one of 80 participants (40 representing the NBA draft hopefuls) for the NBA G League Elite Camp in May 2019. He was subsequently added to the NBA Draft Combine. During the combine, he put up new records at the event, including height (which received comparisons to former NBA player Manute Bol), wingspan, and standing reach.

=== Boston Celtics (2019–2021) ===
After going undrafted in the 2019 NBA draft, Fall joined the Boston Celtics for the 2019 NBA Summer League, participating in all five games and averaging 7.2 points, 4.0 rebounds, 1.4 blocks, and shooting a team-high 77 percent from the field. He signed with the Celtics on 25 July 2019. On 13 October, the Celtics converted Fall to a two-way contract, which split his time with the Celtics and Maine Red Claws of the NBA G League. Fall made his debut for the Celtics on 26 October during a game against the New York Knicks at Madison Square Garden. He recorded four points and three rebounds in four minutes, with his first points coming from a standing dunk. On 20 December, Fall recorded a season-high five points, along with two rebounds and one block, in a 114–93 victory over the Detroit Pistons. On 13 August 2020, he logged season highs of four rebounds and two blocks in a 96–90 loss to the Washington Wizards. Fall led the Celtics in field goal percentage during the 2019–20 season.

With the Red Claws during the 2019–20 NBA G League season, Fall averaged a double-double of 12.9 points and 11.1 rebounds per game. He earned All-Defensive Team honors, with averages of nearly three blocks per game.

On 23 November 2020, Fall re-signed with the Celtics on another two-way contract. On 30 December, Fall made his season debut for the Celtics, recording two points, a rebound, and two blocks in a 126–107 win over the Memphis Grizzlies. On 15 January 2021, Fall logged a season-high six points, along with five rebounds and one block, in a 124–97 blowout victory over the Orlando Magic. On 5 May, he recorded a season-high four blocks in a 132–96 blowout victory over the Magic. On 16 May, Fall grabbed a season-high eight rebounds in a 92–96 loss to the New York Knicks. Despite being under a two-way contract, Fall never played in the G League during the 2020–21 season due to the Red Claws not playing due to the COVID-19 pandemic. He also led the Celtics in field goal percentage for the second consecutive season.

=== Cleveland Cavaliers (2021–2022) ===
On 27 September 2021, Fall signed with the Cleveland Cavaliers. On 16 October, his deal was converted to a two-way contract with the Cleveland Charge. On 11 November, Fall made his debut for the Charge, logging a G League career-high 23 points along with 12 rebounds and three blocks in 29 minutes of play. On 22 December, Fall made his first career NBA start in a 111–101 loss to his former team, the Celtics, grabbing a career-high 10 rebounds and a season-high four points.

On 9 January 2022, Fall was waived by the Cavaliers.

=== Cleveland Charge (2022) ===
On 12 January 2022, Fall was re-acquired by the Cleveland Charge.

=== Xinjiang Flying Tigers (2022–2023) ===
On 24 August 2022, Fall signed a one-year contract to play for the Xinjiang Flying Tigers of the Chinese Basketball Association.

Fall joined the Milwaukee Bucks for the 2023 NBA Summer League.

=== Nanjing Monkey Kings and New Zealand Breakers (2023–2025) ===
On 17 August 2023, Fall signed with the Nanjing Monkey Kings of the Chinese Basketball Association. In 44 games during the 2023–24 season, he averaged 8.8 points, 6.1 rebounds, and 1.4 blocks per game.

In September 2024, Fall joined the New Zealand Breakers of the Australian National Basketball League (NBL) for the club's three-game U.S. tour. He went on to miss all three games due to a quad injury. Fall returned with the Breakers to New Zealand, where he trained with the team as a practice player. On 26 November, Fall signed a two-year contract with the Breakers. In 18 games during the 2024–25 NBL season, he averaged 11.4 points, 6.6 rebounds and 1.6 blocks per game.

On 2 March 2025, Fall signed with the Nanjing Monkey Kings for the rest of the 2024–25 CBA season. In 12 games, he averaged 11.0 points, 6.6 rebounds, and 1.4 blocks per game.

On 22 July 2025, the Breakers parted ways with Fall.

=== Ningbo Rockets (2025–2026) ===
On 29 August 2025, Fall signed with the Ningbo Rockets of the Chinese Basketball Association.

=== Philadelphia 76ers (2026–present) ===
On 1 September 2026, Fall signed an Exhibit 10 contract with the Philadelphia 76ers. On 17 October, the 76ers converted Fall to a two-way contract.

Tacko Fall with the 76ers in November 2026

== Player profile ==
Given his size, Fall plays the center position. His shoe size is 22 (US), his wingspan is 8 ft 4 in (2.54 m) and he has a reported standing reach of 10 ft 2 in (3.10 m). Fall also has a maximum vertical leap of 2 ft 2.5 in (67 cm). His hands measure at 10.5 inches (27 cm) in length and width. Prior to the 2019 NBA draft, Fall was viewed as a great shot blocker who was relatively lacking in lane agility and three-quarter-court sprinting speed.

== Career statistics ==
Legend
GP	Games played	GS	Games started	MPG	Minutes per game
FG%	Field goal percentage	3P%	3-point field goal percentage	FT%	Free throw percentage
RPG	Rebounds per game	APG	Assists per game	SPG	Steals per game
BPG	Blocks per game	PPG	Points per game	**Bold**	Career high

=== NBA ===
==== Regular season ====
Year	Team	GP	GS	MPG	FG%	3P%	FT%	RPG	APG	SPG	BPG	PPG
2019–20	Boston	7	0	4.7	**.786**	—	**.333**	2.1	.1	.1	.6	**3.3**
2020–21	Boston	**19**	0	**7.2**	.724	—	**.333**	**2.7**	**.2**	.1	**1.1**	2.5
2021–22	Cleveland	11	**1**	5.4	.417	—	.286	2.1	**.2**	.0	.5	1.1
Career		37	1	6.2	.673	—	.320	2.4	.2	.1	.8	2.2

==== Playoffs ====
Year	Team	GP	GS	MPG	FG%	3P%	FT%	RPG	APG	SPG	BPG	PPG
2020	Boston	**2**	0	**1.5**	**1.000**	—	**.500**	.5	.0	.0	.0	**1.5**
2021	Boston	1	0	1.0	—	—	—	**1.0**	.0	.0	.0	.0
Career		3	0	1.3	1.000	—	.500	.7	.0	.0	.0	1.0

=== College ===
Year	Team	GP	GS	MPG	FG%	3P%	FT%	RPG	APG	SPG	BPG	PPG
2015–16	UCF	30	26	17.6	.750	—	**.558**	5.9	.3	.1	2.3	7.4
2016–17	UCF	**36**	**36**	**26.3**	.715	.000	.462	**9.5**	**.6**	**.3**	**2.6**	10.9
2017–18	UCF	16	15	21.9	**.767**	—	.460	7.3	.3	**.3**	1.9	**11.3**
2018–19	UCF	32	32	24.9	.750	—	.363	7.7	.5	**.3**	**2.6**	11.0
Career		115	110	23.0	.740	.000	.432	7.7	.4	.2	2.4	10.1

== Personal life ==
Fall is a Muslim, and selected the jersey number 99 with the Celtics as a reference to the 99 names of Allah. He is not the only tall member of his family; Fall's younger brother was reportedly 5 ft 9 in (1.75 m) at age seven, while two of his uncles are 6 ft 8 in (2.03 m), but his extreme height stands apart even among them. Fall maintained a 4.0 grade-point average (GPA) in high school, while taking advanced mathematics and science classes. He became fluent in English within eight months and scored in the 95th percentile on the SAT. Fall was a computer-science major at UCF and originally had aspirations of becoming an engineer for electronic companies such as Siemens or Microsoft.
