= Octavio De La Grana =

Cuban-American basketball coach

Miami Heat
- Position: Assistant coach
- League: NBA

Personal information
- Born: January 28, 1961 (age 65) Havana, Cuba

Career information
- High school: Florida Christian School (Olympia Heights, Florida)
- College: Liberty
- Coaching career: 1996–present

Career history

Coaching
- 1996: Florida Christian School
- 1998–2004: Westminster Christian School
- 2005: Florida Christian School
- 2006–2009: Miami Heat (scout)
- 2009–2010: Miami Heat (player development)
- 2010–2012: Miami Heat (assistant)
- 2013–2016: Sioux Falls Skyforce (assistant)
- 2016–present: Miami Heat (assistant)

Career highlights
- As head coach: FHSAA Class 2A State championship (1996); FHSAA Class 2A Coach of the Year (1996); As assistant coach: NBA champion (2012); NBA D-League champion (2016)

Octavio De La Grana (born January 28, 1961) is a Cuban-American basketball coach, currently working as an assistant coach for the Miami Heat of the National Basketball Association (NBA).

== Coaching career ==
By 2006, De La Grana had a combined 21 years of head coaching experience at the high school level, including two stints at Florida Christian School, where he led his team to the FHSAA Class 2A State Championship in 1996, a season in which he garnered Coach of the Year honors. He also spent eight years as head basketball coach at Westminster Christian High School. In 2005, he recorded his 400th high school coaching victory. During his tenure at Florida Christian, De La Grana also spent time as the school's Athletic Director (1990–95) and faculty Department Chair for Physical Education.

=== Miami Heat ===
De La Grana began working with the Miami Heat prior to the 2006–07 season. Before the start of the 2016–17 season, Heat head coach Erik Spoelstra added De La Grana to his coaching staff as assistant coach.

== Personal life ==
De La Grana was born in Havana, Cuba in 1961 and was only 6 years old when he came to the United States. His father was from Lajas and mother from Artemisa. De La Grana and his wife, Angie, reside in Palmetto Bay with their six children.

== See also ==
- List of foreign NBA coaches
