= Fotios Malelis =

Greek basketball player

As Papagou
- Position: Power forward
- League: Greek A2 Elite League

Personal information
- Born: June 25, 1997 (age 29) Athens, Greece
- Listed height: 6 ft 8.75 in (2.05 m)
- Listed weight: 205 lb (93 kg)

Career information
- High school: Arlington Country Day School (Jacksonville, Florida)
- College: St. Thomas (FL) (2016–2019)
- NBA draft: 2019: undrafted
- Playing career: 2019–present

Career history
- 2019–2020: Panionios
- 2020–2021: Dafni Dafniou
- 2021–2023: Psychiko
- 2023–2024: Karditsa
- 2024: Aias Evosmou
- 2024–present: Ermis Schimatari

Fotios "Fotis" Malelis (Greek: Φώτιος "Φώτης" Μαλέλης; born June 25, 1997) is a Greek professional basketball player for Ermis Schimatari of the Greek A2 Elite League. He is a 2.05 m tall power forward.

== High school ==
Malelis played high school basketball at the Arlington Country Day School, in Jacksonville, Florida.

== College career ==
Malelis played college basketball in the National Association of Intercollegiate Athletics, with the St. Thomas University, from 2016 to 2019.

== Professional career ==
After going undrafted at the 2019 NBA draft Malelis joined Panionios of the Greek Basket League.

On September 8, 2020, Malelis joined Dafni Dafniou of the Greek A2 League.

On August 20, 2021, he moved to Psychiko of the Greek A2 League, where he stayed for two seasons.

On September 24, 2023, Malelis returned to the top division, signing with Karditsa.

On January 7, 2024, Malelis moved to Aias Evosmou.
