= Noble Academy (Greensboro, North Carolina) =

Independent day school

Coordinates: 36°8′50″N 79°52′30″W

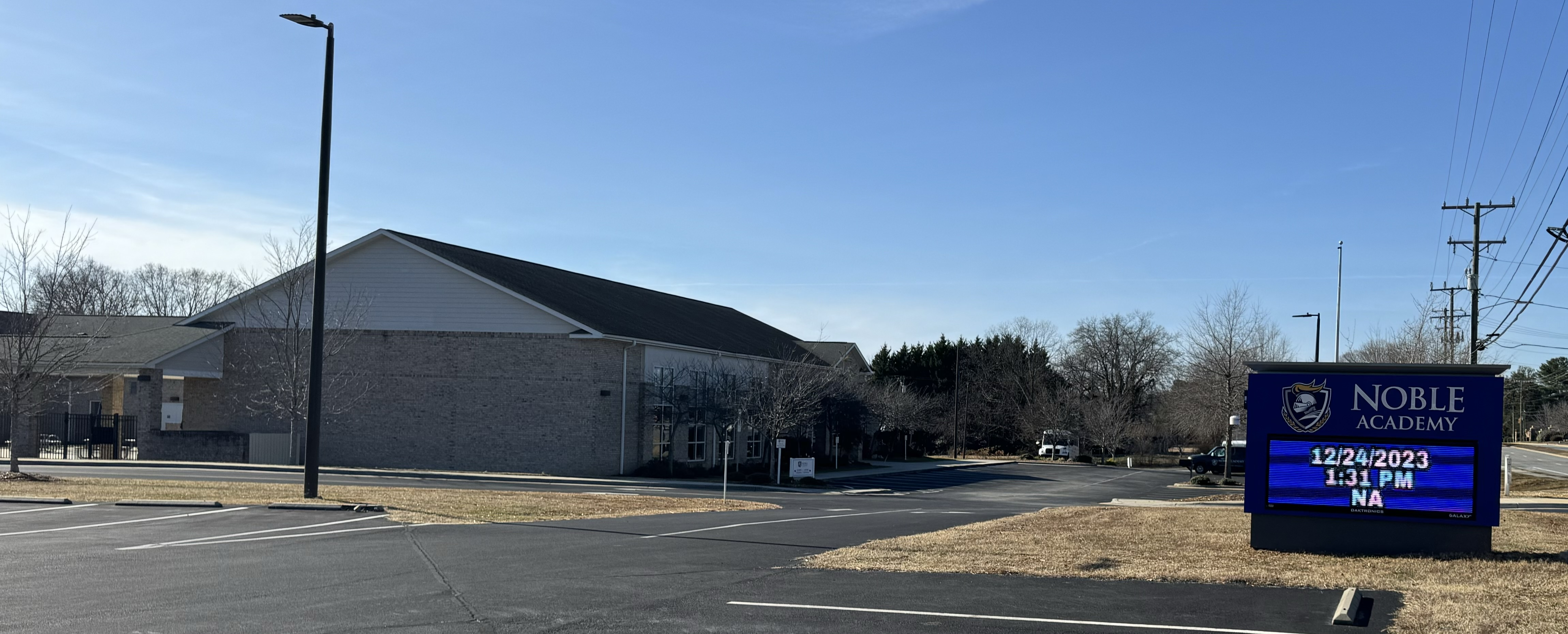

Information
- Established: 1987

Noble Academy is an independent day school in Greensboro, North Carolina. The school exclusively serves students with diagnosed learning disabilities or learning differences such as Attention Deficit/Hyperactive Disorder (ADHD), dyslexia, dysgraphia, dyscalculia or Central Auditory Processing Disorder (CAPD), with average to above average intellect.

== History ==
Noble Academy was founded in 1987 under the name "Unlimited Learning" by Ginger Parnell and Rita Rice as a testing and tutorial service in Greensboro. In 1990, the school changed its name to Guilford Day School and adopted the Knight as the school mascot. In 1992, the school relocated to its current property on Horse Pen Creek Road. In 2010, the school went through a re-branding process that recommended that the school change its name. Based on feedback from students and parents, the Knight was kept as the school mascot, and the name was changed to Noble Academy to align with that symbolism. In 2012, Noble Academy opened a new building for its Upper School (6th–12th grades), allowing its Lower School to expand within the previous building. The school is accredited by the Southern Association of Independent Schools (SAIS), International Dyslexia Association (IDA), COGNIA, and is a WilsonⓇ Accredited Partner - Best Practice Site.

== Programs ==
In addition to its college preparation curriculum following the North Carolina standard course of study, Noble Academy offers a variety of opportunities to its students:

Noble Academy is a full day school program that includes visual and performing arts, PE, and IDEApath as electives. Extracurricular activities such as clubs, National Honor Society and Junior National Beta Club are offered. A full athletics program for Middle School and Varsity Athletics include soccer, basketball, volleyball, golf, cross country, flag football, and Esports.

Noble Academy offers free reading screenings to the public for children ages 7–11 as well as tutoring services.
