= Chol Marial =

South Sudanese basketball player

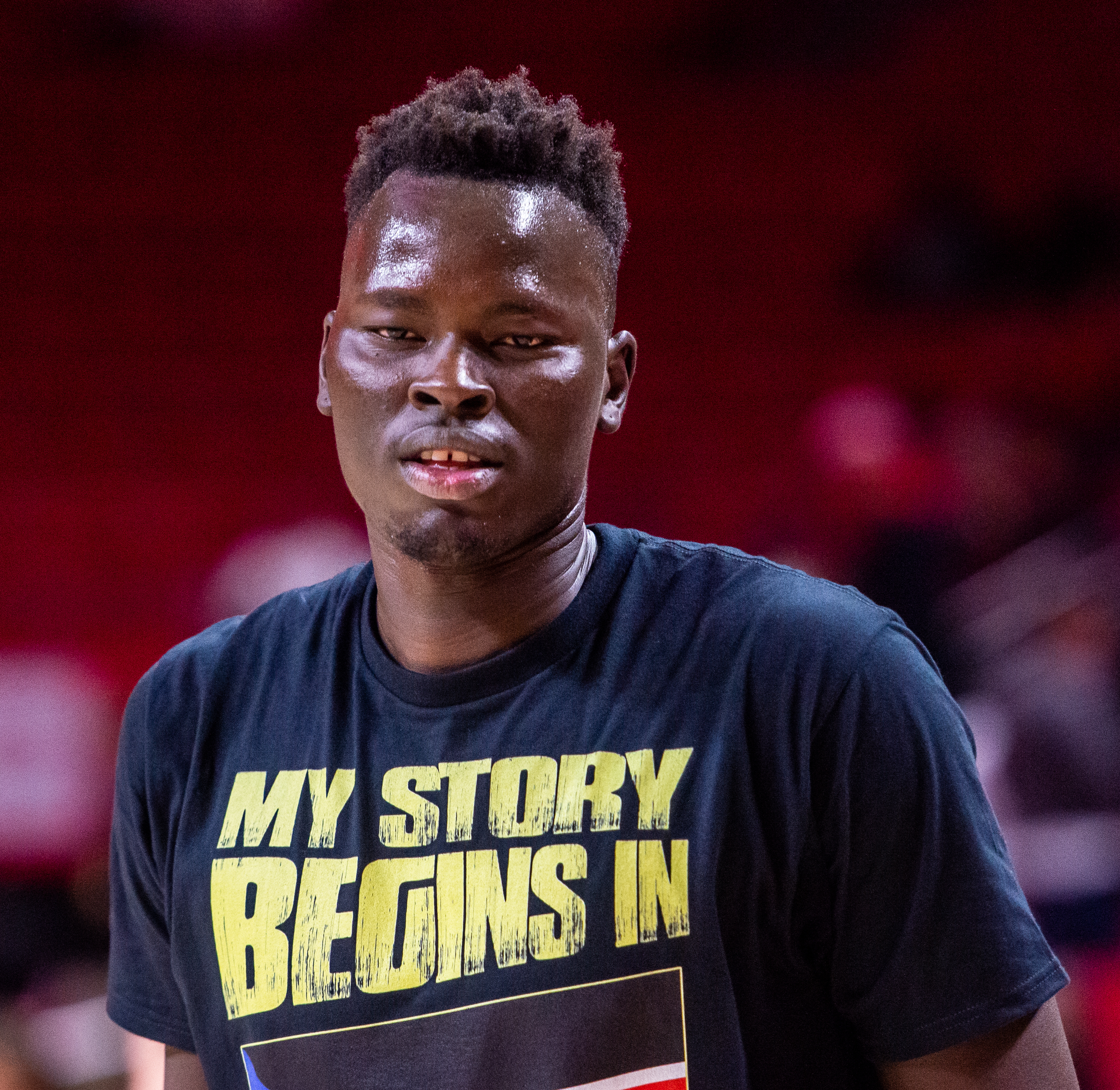
- Marial with Maryland in 2020

Nadim Souaid Academy
- Position: Center
- League: Lebanese Basketball League

Personal information
- Born: 1 November 1999 (age 27) Rumbek, Sudan (now South Sudan)
- Listed height: 7 ft 2 in (2.18 m)
- Listed weight: 235 lb (107 kg)

Career information
- High school: Arlington Country Day School (Jacksonville, Florida); Cheshire Academy (Cheshire, Connecticut); IMG Academy (Bradenton, Florida); AZ Compass Prep (Chandler, Arizona)
- College: Maryland (2019–2021); Oregon State (2022–2024); San Jose State (2024–2025)

Career history
- 2025–2026: Mesa Monsoons
- 2026–present: Nadim Souaid Academy

Chol Beny Marial (born 1 November 1999) is a South Sudanese basketball player. He previously played for the Maryland Terrapins, the Oregon State Beavers, and San Jose State Spartans.

== Early life ==
Marial was born in Rumbek, a city in what is now known as South Sudan. He grew up away from areas of war and famine, which were prevalent across the country. Marial played soccer from age five but was soon held back by his exceptional height and started playing basketball in 2013. In the same year, he was discovered at a Basketball Without Borders camp in Johannesburg, South Africa. His cousin, in 2014, helped him join an all-star team at the Middle East & North Africa (MENA) Basketball Showcase in Dubai.

In 2014, with the help of his cousin who had lived in Florida, Marial moved to the United States to complete middle school at West Oaks Academy in Orlando, Florida, where he played varsity basketball. In June 2015, he drew attention from national media outlets, including ESPN and The Washington Post, for his extraordinary size after featuring in a viral highlight video.

== High school career ==
Entering his freshman year, Marial transferred to Arlington Country Day School in Jacksonville, Florida, following his former head coach at West Oaks Academy, Shaun Wiseman. In November, he moved to Cheshire Academy in Cheshire, Connecticut because of its superior academics. In August 2016, Marial played in Adidas Nations, averaging 7.2 points and 5.2 rebounds per game while shooting 72.7 percent from the field. On 28 July 2017, heading into his junior year, he transferred to IMG Academy in Bradenton, Florida. His season was limited to 17 games because of foot and shin injuries. Marial was sidelined with a hairline fracture in his shin while playing Amateur Athletic Union (AAU) basketball in the summer of 2018. For his senior year, he joined AZ Compass Preparatory School in Chandler, Arizona.

=== Recruiting ===
As early as his freshman year in high school, Marial was receiving offers from major NCAA Division I programs, including Florida State, Iowa, and West Virginia. In January 2017, he emerged as one of the best players in the 2019 class. ESPN ranked him third overall, and 247Sports rated him as the second-best center in his class. In the following years, however, he plummeted down rankings, partly because he struggled with injuries and changed high schools several times. On 6 May 2019, Marial committed to play college basketball for Maryland. He was attracted to Maryland because he liked its coaching staff and players, and due to the improvement Bruno Fernando, who had a similar background as Marial, displayed with the program. When Marial finished high school, he was considered a four-star recruit by ESPN and Rivals and a three-star recruit by 247Sports.

College recruiting
Name	Hometown	School	Height	Weight	Commit date
Chol Marial; C	Chandler, AZ	AZ Compass Prep (AZ)	7 ft 2 in (2.18 m)	225 lb (102 kg)	May 6, 2019
Chol Marial; C	Recruit ratings: Rivals: 247Sports: ESPN: (88)				
Overall recruit ranking: 247Sports: 171 ESPN: 58
Note: In many cases, Scout, Rivals, 247Sports, On3, and ESPN may conflict in their listings of height and weight.; In these cases, the average was taken. ESPN grades are on a 100-point scale.; Sources: "Maryland 2019 Basketball Commitments". Rivals.; "2019 Maryland Terrapins Recruiting Class". ESPN.; "2019 Team Ranking". Rivals.

== College career ==
Marial missed the first 12 games of his freshman season after undergoing surgery to repair stress fractures in both legs. He played sparingly during his two years at Maryland. After his sophomore season, Marial transferred to Oregon State. After his senior season, Marial transferred to San Jose State.

== Career statistics ==
Legend
GP	Games played	GS	Games started	MPG	Minutes per game
FG%	Field goal percentage	3P%	3-point field goal percentage	FT%	Free throw percentage
RPG	Rebounds per game	APG	Assists per game	SPG	Steals per game
BPG	Blocks per game	PPG	Points per game	**Bold**	Career high

=== College ===
Year	Team	GP	GS	MPG	FG%	3P%	FT%	RPG	APG	SPG	BPG	PPG
2019–20	Maryland	12	0	5.4	**.500**	.000	.000	1.6	**.2**	.1	.4	.8
2020–21	Maryland	18	1	6.2	.370	.125	.500	1.1	.1	.1	.6	1.6
2022–23	Oregon State	9	8	**13.1**	.318	.333	**1.000**	2.2	**.2**	**.2**	**1.2**	2.2
2023–24	Oregon State	**31**	**9**	11.7	.366	**.444**	.800	**2.4**	**.2**	**.2**	1.0	**2.3**
2024–25	San Jose State	28	3	9.1	.383	.231	.750	2.2	.1	.1	1.1	1.6
Career		98	21	9.3	.373	.278	.680	2.0	.2	.1	.9	1.8

== Personal life ==
Marial is a cousin of NBA free agent Thon Maker. He is a member of the Dinka ethnic group. Marial speaks Dinka, Arabic, and English.
