= Tallavana Christian School =

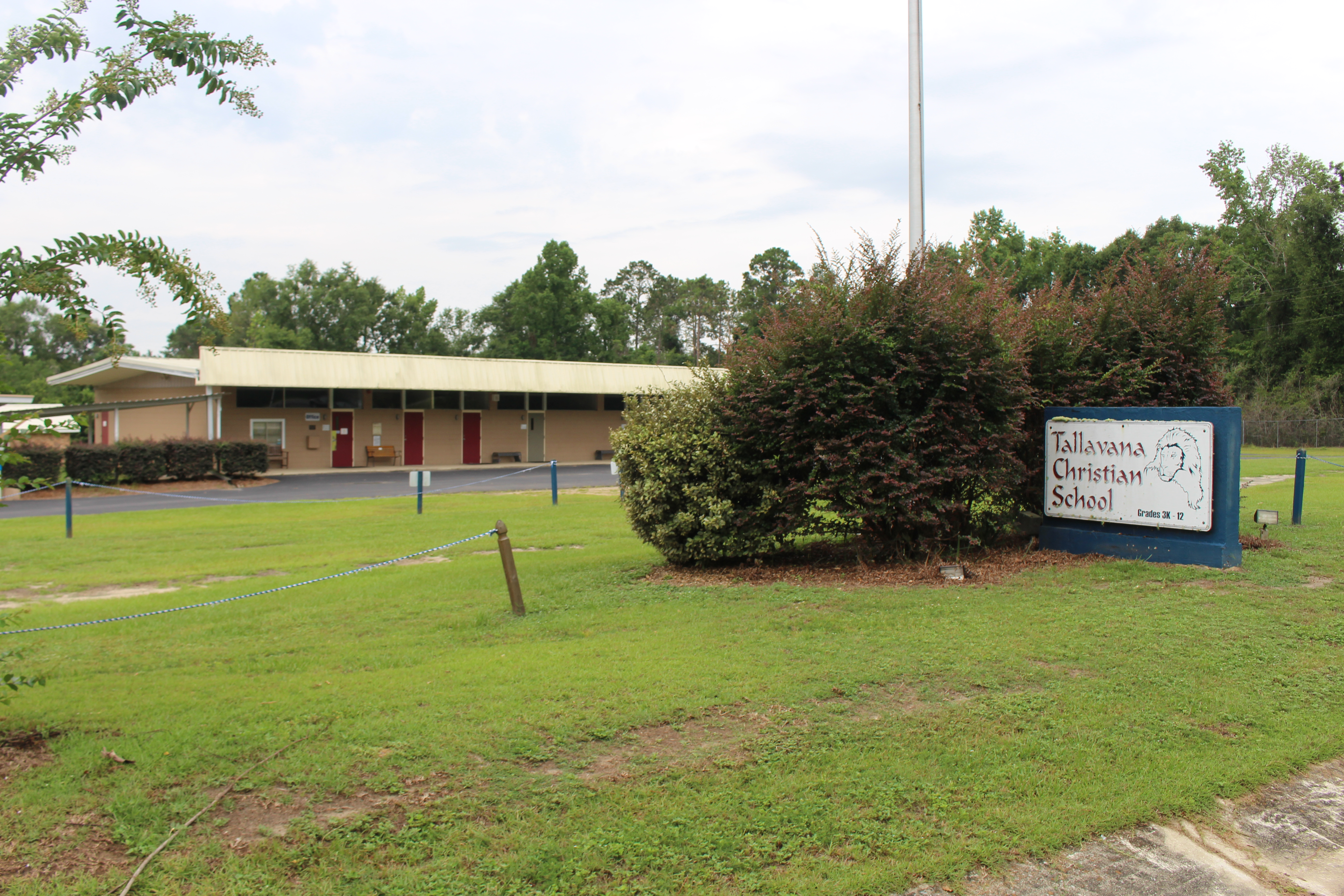

Location
- Havana, Florida; 30.6074047°N 84.4737359°W

Information
- Former name: Gadsden Christian Academy (1971-1995)
- Established: 1971
- NCES School ID: 00266537
- Enrollment: 201 (2016)
- Campus size: 31 acres (13 ha)
- Website: www.tallavanachristian.com

Tallavana Christian School (TCS) is a private K–12 school Christian school in unincorporated Gadsden County, Florida, near Havana, that was founded as a segregation academy. It is a ministry of the Tallavana Church, and it is in proximity to Quincy and Tallahassee.

== History ==
Initially known as the Gadsden Christian Academy, it was established in 1971, by two ministers as a segregation academy. The staff of Tallahassee Christian School (now known as North Florida Christian School) helped establish Gadsden Christian, which was originally to be called "Christian Academy of Quincy". The school's original planned site was in Greensboro. The school ultimately opened under the Gadsden Christian name in fall 1973. At the time schools in Gadsden County were racially integrating, and many white students were enrolled at Munroe Day School.

It received its current name in 1995. As of 2006 the student body includes racial and ethnic minorities. Enrollment in 2016 matches the composition of the surrounding communities.
