= Pensacola Christian Academy =

Private Christian school in Pensacola, Florida, United States

Coordinates: 30.4688°N 87.2411°W

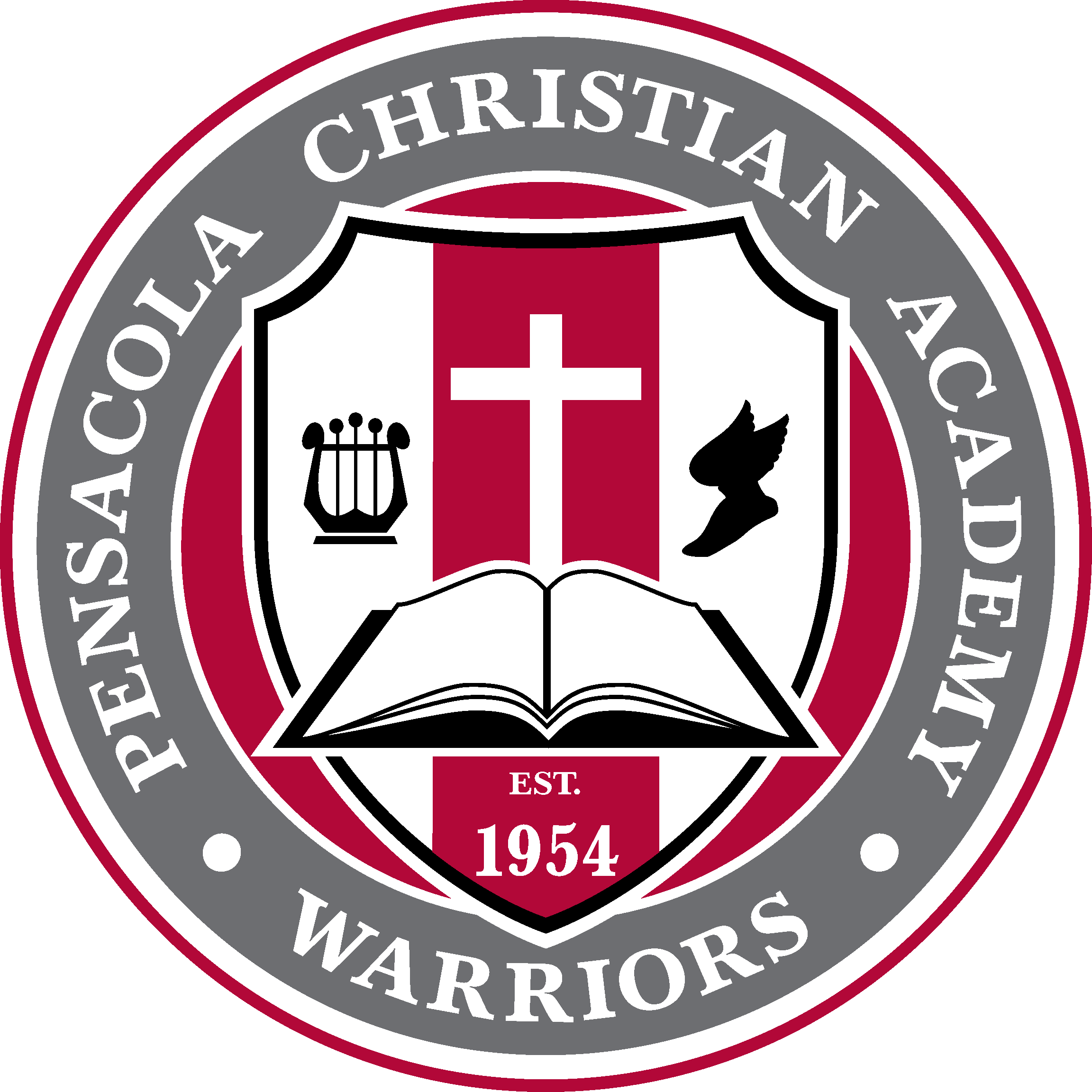
- 10 Brent Lane, Pensacola, Florida 32503; United States

Information
- Type: Private
- Opened: 1954
- Grades: K4 (preschool) to 12
- Colors: Red and Black
- Team name: Warriors
- Website: http://www.pensacolachristianacademy.com/

Pensacola Christian Academy (PCA) is a private Christian school serving elementary through high school grades. It is located in Pensacola, Florida, United States.

== History ==
The school was founded as Pensacola Christian School in 1954 by Arlin and Beka Horton, who later established Pensacola Christian College.

PCS began in a three-classroom building, offering kindergarten through second grade. One grade was added each year until the school reached 9th grade. In the early days PCS was one of the only schools with air-conditioned classrooms. Grades 10 through 12 were added after the school was moved to a larger facility in the mid-1960s.

The Hortons and PCS have claimed, falsely, that the school was desegregated in 1969, before the IRS' decision to remove tax-exempt status from segregated schools. The first black students appeared in the 1972 yearbook. In addition to denying black children enrollment, the school refused to hire black staff until sometime after 1963. The earliest record of black employees is in the 1969 yearbook.

In 1994, PCS completed a new facility on Brent Lane in Pensacola. After moving there, the school changed its name to Pensacola Christian Academy.

== Program ==
PCA is an Independent Baptist Christian school using Abeka curriculum. The school is accredited through the Florida Association of Christian Colleges and Schools, an accrediting body for Christian schools. The school is dedicated to "traditional methods" such as phonics for teaching reading and the art of cursive for penmanship. Although criticized by some, PCA begins teaching cursive as early as kindergarten.

== Dress regulations ==
Girls are only allowed to wear skirts or dresses that do not rise above their knees (7–12th only) and shirts that do not show their stomach. Boys can wear pants. Boys cannot wear shorts (7th–12th only). For girls most jewelry is permitted. Cartilage/facial/tongue/lip/eyebrow/belly button piercings are not permitted. No words are allowed on the clothing, unless they are able to be covered by one or two fingers or a 4x6 note card.

== Associations ==
Pensacola Christian Academy is associated with Pensacola Christian College, and is used extensively by the PCC Education Department as a training grounds for PCC Education students. All PCC Education internships as well as many classroom observation practicums are held within the PCA facility.

The A Beka Books curriculum, which is marketed to homeschoolers and private Christian schools throughout the world, is named for the co-founder of the Pensacola Christian Academy, Beka Horton. The curriculum was developed within PCA and is the curriculum used solely by the school. A Beka Books textbooks are written from a conservative Christian perspective and are available to home schoolers and Christian schools for purchase through the A Beka Books website.

PCA is affiliated with A Beka Academy, a correspondence-school system that uses the A Beka Books curriculum. The A Beka Academy sells DVDs of PCA teachers recorded while teaching live classes at PCA. All student test scores and grades for those enrolled in A Beka Academy are sent to and recorded at the A Beka Academy offices. On completion of the 12th grade, a home-schooled student of A Beka Academy may graduate.

== Notable alumni ==
Name	Known for	Relationship to Pensacola Christian Academy
Eric Hovind	Operator of Creation Science Evangelism	Graduate 1996

== See also ==
- Pensacola Christian College
