= Dade Christian School =

Location
- 6601 NW 167 St. Miami, Florida; United States; 25.9263°N 80.3065°W

Information
- Type: Private Christian
- Motto: Where Christ Makes a Difference
- Established: 1961
- President: Pastor Reyner Cruz
- Grades: 2k–12th Grade
- Enrollment: 595
- Campus: Suburban
- Colors: Red and white
- Athletics: Baseball, Cross Country, Basketball, Volleyball,
- Mascot: Warriors
- Accreditation: Florida Association of Christian Colleges and Schools, Middle States Association of Colleges and Schools
- Website: www.dadechristian.org
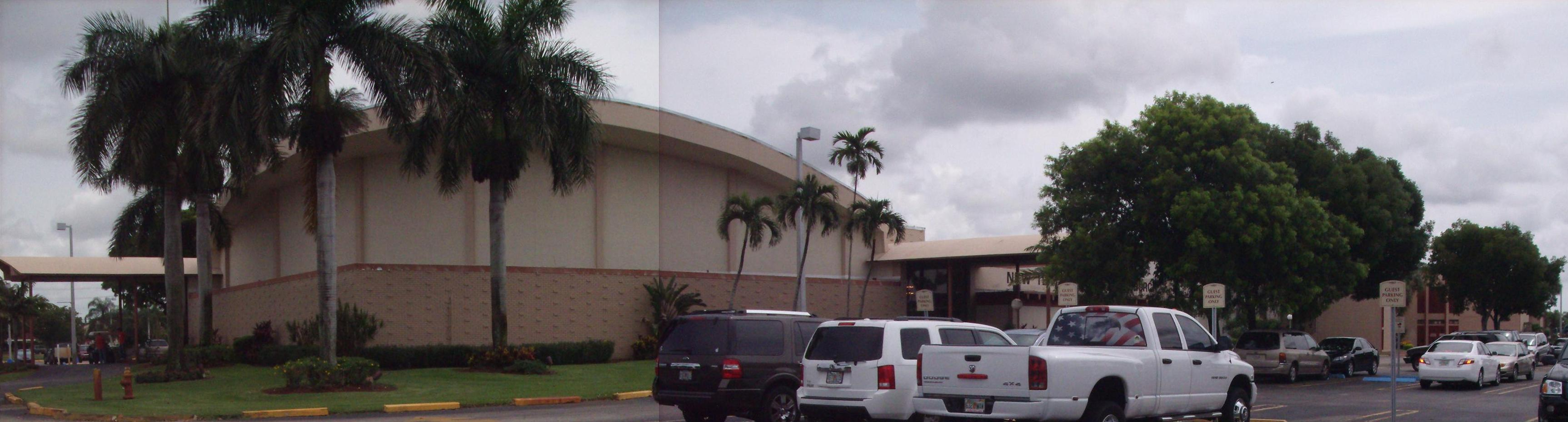

Dade Christian School is a private Christian school that enrolls kindergarten through 12th grade students in Miami, Florida.

The school was founded as a segregation academy in response to the court-ordered desegregation of Miami-Dade public schools. It is one of two private schools run by New Testament Baptist Church, a Southern Baptist church that also runs The Master's Academy. Dade Christian School had a 2024-2025 enrollment of 595.

== History ==
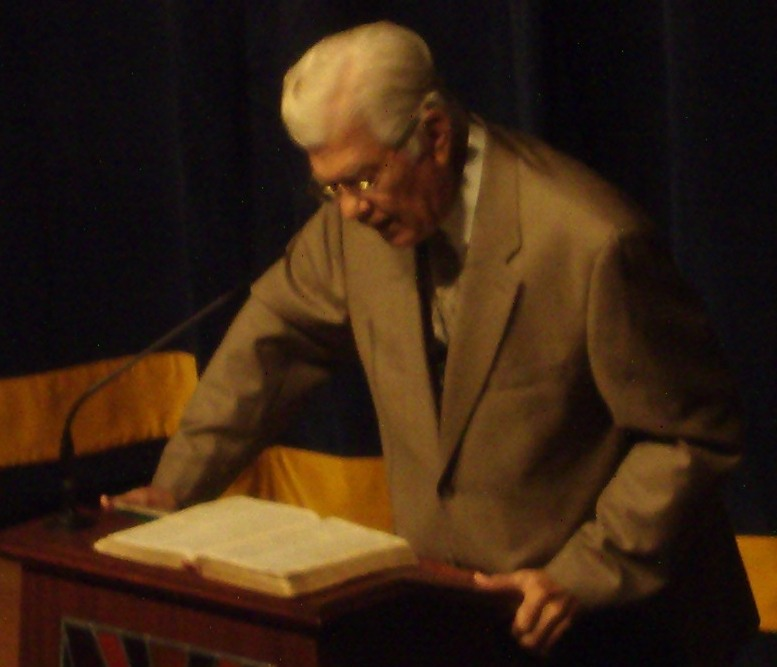
Al Janney, founder of New Testament Baptist Church and Dade Christian

=== Founding ===
New Testament Baptist Church was founded in 1954, and Dade Christian School in 1961 by Pastor Al Janney. Janney founded Dade Christian School in reaction to court decisions removing mandatory prayer from public schools and as a segregation academy, a school founded to enable white parents to avoid having their children educated alongside black children. Janney pastored New Testament Baptist Church until 1976. He also founded the Florida Association of Christian Colleges and Schools, the American Association of Christian Schools, and the Baptist University of America. The next pastor, E.G. Robertson, pastored until 1986 and oversaw Dade Christian when it was named a Blue Ribbon School in 1984. The current President and Senior Pastor of New Testament Baptist Church which currently oversees Dade Christian School is Pastor Reyner Cruz.

=== Segregation ruling ===
In 1973, a lawsuit was brought against Dade Christian School by an African-American couple named in the court documents as Mr. and Mrs. Johnny Brown, Jr. At the time, Dade Christian was an all-white school. The Browns sought injunctive and monetary relief against the school for not allowing their two daughters to attend. The couple had been handed a card that said the policy of the school was "one of nonintegration" and had been asked to leave. The school claimed in their defense that it was against their religious belief to have a desegregated school because of their belief objecting to interracial marriages. The school lost, leaving Brown's attorney to comment that the last quasi-legal segregation had been eliminated. Surprisingly, the Browns still wanted their children to attend the school. When Dade Christian School appealed the ruling in Brown v. Dade Christian School, Inc. (581 F.2d 472) in 1977, the United States Court of Appeals for the Fifth Circuit ruled in favor of the plaintiff in what was considered an open question left by the Supreme Court at the time. The court failed to produce a majority opinion, though, deciding to limit themselves to the specifics of the case. They concluded that even if it was a part of the school's religious beliefs, it was a minor one and thus outweighed by anti-discrimination rules. This brought up questions regarding the free exercise of religion if courts can determine what a religion holds.

=== Current ===
The ministry of Dade Christian School serves a diverse population of predominantly Hispanic and African American families.

=== Partial campus sale ===
In 2022, Dade Christian School sold about half of its campus to a real estate developer, a sale it began exploring three years earlier.

== Cheerleading ==
At the 2006 Fellowship of Christian Cheerleaders National Competition in Orlando, the junior high team won first place with a rendition of Grease. The elementary stunt group also finished first.

== Notable alumni ==
- Maurice Kemp: Class of 2009, basketball player in the Israeli Basketball Premier League
- Chez Pazienza (1969–2017), journalist, author, television producer, and media consultant
