= North Florida Christian School =

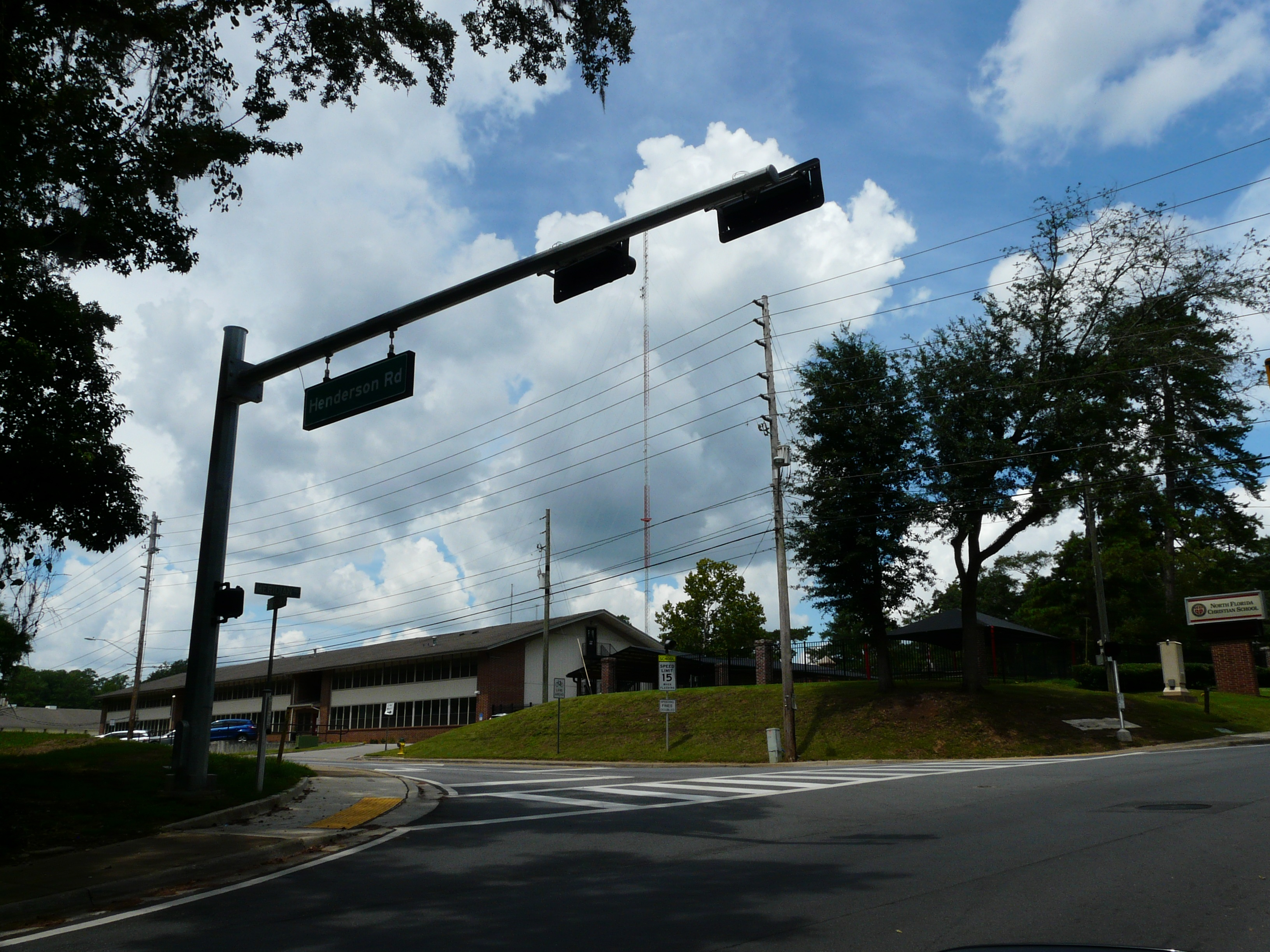

Location
- 3000 N Meridian Rd; Tallahassee, Florida 32312; United States; 30.486897°N 84.278237°W

Information
- Type: Private, Christian
- Established: 1966
- CEEB code: 101677
- NCES School ID: 00263795
- Administrator: Tom Phillips
- Enrollment: 506
- Campus: Suburban
- Campus size: 30 acres (12 ha)
- Colors: Red, white and black
- Mascot: Eagles
- Website: www.nflschool.org

North Florida Christian School (NFCS) is a private Christian school in Tallahassee, Florida, originally founded as a segregation academy. The school is administered by North Florida Baptist Church, formerly known as Temple Baptist Church.1

== History ==
Originally known as Tallahassee Christian School, it was founded in 1966 by Temple Baptist Church pastor Rayburn L. Blair and headmaster James Pound. Pound served as principal and school superintendent until his retirement in 1988.

Although the school is open today to students of all races, it was founded by white parents, one of several segregation academies started in response to the federally mandated racial integration of Leon County Schools.

Among the parents who withdrew their children from public schools and enrolled them at NFCS were Board of Regents member Fred Parker and state senator Miley Miers. Parker told the AP that he enrolled his four children in NFCS because he didn't want them to be subject to desegregation busing. Parker added that an advantage of NFCS was that the private school's bus service had a stop near his home. Miers said he moved her three children to NFCS since so they would not "suffer" from the end of the separate-but-equal doctrine.

In 1970, NFCS signed an agreement to lease the Old Sealey School campus from the Leon County school board for $5.00 per day. In response to the lease, the U.S. Department of Health, Education, and Welfare blocked the public school system from receiving a $200,000 federal grant since the school board was aiding a racially segregated private school.

NFCS hosted a campaign rally for George Wallace's 1972 presidential campaign. Wallace later claimed he had no prior knowledge of flyers distributed at the rally promoting school segregation.

In 1975, school head James Pound told the Tallahassee Democrat that the school had turned down all black applicants to avoid racial conflict at the school.

In 1978, NFCS expelled three students because their parents tried to start a parent teacher organization independent of the school. About 100 parents attempted to form the PTA to improve academic standards at the NFCS. The school, which at the time had over 1700 students, sent a letter to all parents explaining that if they disagreed with the church's administration of the school, they should withdraw their children.

School faculty of Tallahassee Christian helped establish another segregation academy, Gadsden Christian Academy (now known as the Tallavanna Christian School) in Gadsden County in 1971.

== Demographics ==
In 2018 the school reported to the NCES the following: 506 total students, of whom 261 were White, 147 Black, 23 Hispanic, 7 Asian and 12 of two or more races.

== Accreditation ==
NFCS is accredited by the Southern Association of Colleges and Schools, the Florida Association of Christian Colleges and Schools, and the Commission on International and Trans-Regional Accreditation.

== Athletics ==
=== 1986 FHSAA player eligibility controversy ===
In 1986, the football team included a student who transferred in violation of FHSAA regulations. The FHSAA declared each game in which the student participated be forfeited, making the school ineligible for the playoffs. NFCS sued in state court and was granted an injunction allowing it to participate in the playoffs. The court later upheld the ruling allowing the student's participation.

=== State championships ===
NFCS athletics state championships
Team	Year	Classification	Head coach	Record	Championship Game Score	Opponent	Location
Baseball	1995	3A	Mike Posey	n/a	2-0	Keystone Heights	Ed Smith Stadium, Sarasota
Baseball	2007	2A	Mike Posey	n/a	6-1	Montverde	Ed Smith Stadium, Sarasota
Baseball	2011	2A	Mike Posey	24-4	8-4	Orangewood Christian	Digital Domain Park, Port St. Lucie
Girls Basketball	2008	2A	Aaron Krause	n/a	54-44	Lafayette (Mayo)	The Lakeland Center
Football	1996	2A	Tim Cokely	n/a	34-7	Glades Day	Daytona Bch. Mun. Stadium
Football	1998	2A	Tim Cokely	n/a	30-13	American Heritage	University of Florida
Football	1999	1A	Tim Cokely	n/a	23-13	Fort Meade	University of Florida
Football	2000	1A	Tim Cokely	n/a	20-16	Fort Meade	University of Florida
Football	2001	2A	Tim Cokely	n/a	28-16	Fort Meade	Florida State University
Football	2008	1A	Tim Cokely	10-2	17-7	Fort Meade	Orlando
Football	2011	2A	Robert Craft	13-0	69-0	Admiral Farragut	Citrus Bowl
Football	2018	2A	Steve Price	9-4	28-20	Champagne Catholic	Camping World Stadium

== Notable people ==
- Shannon Bream - Miss Virginia 1990, Fox News host
- Kristen Ledlow - American sports anchor. Host of NBA TV's NBA Inside Stuff
- Jeremy Luther - college basketball coach
- John Nogowski - MLB Baseball Player
- Cole Ragans - MLB Baseball Player
- Traylon Ray - college football wide receiver for the Ole Miss Rebels
- Constantin Ritzmann - NFL Football player
- Cole Sands - MLB Baseball Player
- Ernie Sims - NFL football player
- Casey Weldon - Football player
