= Chez Pazienza =

American journalist

- Born: Cesare Dominic Pazienza; December 11, 1969; Miami, Florida
- Died: February 25, 2017 (aged 47)
- Education: Atlantic Christian School; Dade Christian School; Monsignor Edward Pace High School
- Alma mater: University of Miami
- Occupation(s): Journalist, author, television producer

Cesare Dominic "Chez" Pazienza (December 11, 1969 – February 25, 2017) was an American journalist, author, television producer and media consultant. He was the founder and managing editor of Deus Ex Malcontent, a blog which rose to prominence after Pazienza was fired from his job as a senior producer at CNN in 2008, as well as the CEO of DXM Media.

== Early life ==
Pazienza was born and raised in Miami, Florida, the only child of Mickie and Ralph Pazienza. Throughout most of his childhood his mother was a real estate agent, while his father was an officer with the North Bay Village Police Department and eventually an investigative reporter for Miami's WSVN TV.

== Education ==
Pazienza attended elementary school at Atlantic Christian School in Hialeah, Florida, was enrolled for the 8th grade at Dade Christian School, a strict Baptist academy, and ultimately attended high school at Monsignor Edward Pace High School in the Miami suburb of Opa-locka, Florida. He graduated in 1987 and was voted Most Talented in the Arts among his senior class.

Immediately after high school, Pazienza enrolled at the University of Miami, double-majoring in motion pictures and psychology. He joined the staff of WVUM, the school's radio station, becoming both a DJ and a specialty show host. In 1990, after becoming a drummer in an alternative rock band and deciding that he hoped to make a living playing music, Pazienza left the university, a year short of graduating.

== Career ==
Pazienza began a career in television news in 1992 as a writer/producer at WSVN TV. After rising quickly through the ranks to the position of executive producer he left, moving to Los Angeles to accept a job as a senior producer at KCBS-TV. While there he received his first regional Emmy Award, in 1996, and won a prestigious Golden Mic Award. He went on to work as a producer at KNBC in Los Angeles, where he was given his second regional Emmy, and an executive producer at KCAL-TV in Los Angeles. During his time in television he also served as a producer and manager at WTVJ NBC 6 and WPLG 10 in Miami, and at MSNBC in New York City following the September 11 attacks on the World Trade Center in 2001. His TV career culminated with a senior producer position at CNN, first in Atlanta, Georgia then in New York City.

== Fired by CNN ==
On February 12, 2008, Pazienza was fired by CNN for maintaining a personal blog, called Deus Ex Malcontent, which was started in the summer of 2006, as well as contributing opinion pieces to The Huffington Post. The firing garnered a small amount of media attention and amplified the debate over whether it is acceptable for a journalist to publicly express their personal views on personal time; it also drew attention to the new ethical issues suddenly facing mainstream news organization in the age of social media. Pazienza capitalized on the attention, writing a scathing column for The Huffington Post detailing some of his experiences at CNN, specifically what he felt was a dereliction of duty by the network and mainstream news outlets in general when it came to covering serious news. Since then he continued writing about subjects involving the media; he regularly mined his personal experiences as a television news producer to offer opinionated commentary on topics including NBC's role in the late-night war between Conan O'Brien and Jay Leno, and CNN's decision to fire Rick Sanchez, whom Pazienza worked closely with at several points throughout his career.

== Dead Star Twilight ==
In the wake of the attention thrust on it following his firing, Pazienza made the decision to use his website to exclusively publish his memoir, Dead Star Twilight; discussing his experiences in the time leading up to and immediately following 9/11, which included a drug addiction, stint in rehab, divorce and ultimately an attempt at personal and professional redemption while working at MSNBC and living in New York City. He published it online on April 7, 2008.

== Death ==
On February 26, 2017, Pazienza's employer, The Daily Banter, announced the news of his death.
