= Southern Association of Independent Schools =

American pre-university accreditation organization

- Founded: 1953; 73 years ago
- Type: Non-profit organization
- Purpose: K–12 Accreditation
- Location: 6050 Peachtree Pkwy, Norcross, Georgia, U.S. 30092
- Region served: Southern United States
- Key people: Debra Wilson, President
- Website: sais.org

The Southern Association of Independent Schools (SAIS) is an American voluntary regional accrediting association of more than 380 independent elementary and secondary schools with a combined enrollment of more than 220,000 students throughout the South. Founded in 1953, it establishes accreditation criteria and evaluation procedures by which private schools are reviewed.

== Description ==
Southern Association of Independent Schools is an association of schools in 14 Southeastern states, as well as the Caribbean and Latin America, making it the largest regional independent school association in the country. SAIS oversees a voluntary process of self-evaluation and continuous improvement, the accreditation review of educational quality provided by each member school.

SAIS is a member of the National Association of Independent Schools and the National Council for Private School Accreditation.

Although the United States Department of Education (ED) does not recognize accreditation by SAIS, SAIS works both independently and also in conjunction with other associations, partnering with the following ED-recognized associations to co-accredit schools: Cognia (formerly AdvancED and SACS), Middle States Association of Colleges and Schools, Western Association of Schools and Colleges, American Montessori Society, Association of Waldorf Schools of North America, Association of Christian Schools International, and Christian Schools International. According to the SAIS website, "The federal government recognizes SAIS accreditation for the purposes of issuing student exchange documentation through the Department of Homeland Security. The National Collegiate Athletic Association recognizes SAIS accreditation in determining athletic eligibility for incoming student-athletes."

According to Jennifer Oliver of the Southern Association of Colleges and Schools (SACS), "Accreditation can play a role in where a child can go to college after graduation.... and the child's ability to get scholarships." Additionally, "'There are many other good accrediting organizations,' Oliver said. Some are state-based accrediting agencies, others are for religious schools or private schools, she said, citing the Southern Association of Independent Schools as an example."

A 2010 dissertation described the leadership qualities of independent school headmasters affiliated with three independent school accrediting associations, including the Southern Association of Independent Schools. Heads of independent schools were also the subject of a 2022 NAIS article in Independent School, including a sidebar describing a new SAIS Head of School Database, funded by the E.E. Ford Foundation, that "provides information and visible reports on school head histories, search timing, consulting assignments, immediate prior job appointments, school basics..." The database is available for member school trustees and head of school candidates, to help them "gain a better understanding of the search and transition process".

== History ==
Southern Association of Independent Schools was formed in 1953 to offer accreditation. In the 1950s, SAIS represented 138 schools in 11 southern states. SAIS began accrediting schools outside the United States with the acceptance of Escola Graduada Sao Paulo in Brazil in 1954.

The organization began considering the idea of moderate mixing of the races in 1959. The number of private schools was increasing rapidly, due to the desire of White parents to maintain a system of education which kept their children segregated from Black children. As a result, the SAIS issued a proclamation welcoming good new schools, but condemning attempts "to make financial profit out of the present emergency by the opening of sub-standard private schools".

The organization argued before the Supreme Court in 1976 for the right of independent schools to discriminate based on race. SAIS filed a Friend of the Court brief. Thurgood Marshall responded to an argument advanced by the attorney representing SAIS:

Justice Marshall became noticeably angry later, during Mr. Leonard's argument on behalf of the Southern Independent School Association. The attorney remarked that 250,000 black children attend private schools. The Justice asked him if he knew any that excluded whites. The attorney named one; then, pressed by the Justice, said he did not know it actually excluded whites. Then he suggested schools run by Black Muslims. "You're wrong," Justice Marshall shot back. The lawyer suggested school in Mississippi. "Can you imagine," the Justice asked, "a white student applying to an all‐black school in Mississippi?" The exchange continued; finally, Justice Marshall said, loudly, "All I'm objecting to, sir, is your comparing your schools to the average Negro school. There's no comparison."

— Lesley Oelsner, New York Times

A 1986 merger with Mid-South Association of Independent Schools (founded in 1903) retained the name, "Southern Association of Independent Schools."

SAIS was described in 2005 as "a nongovernmental, voluntary organization that today accredits more than 13,000 public and nonpublic institutions from early childhood through university."

The organization added "Diversity, equity, and inclusion" to its training in 2021. SAIS hosted the 2023 DEI institute in 2023.

SAIS had 2023 a data breach that exposed an estimated 700,000 records online including student and teacher data.

=== Accreditation history ===
SAIS has been offering dual accreditation since 1953. In 2004, SAIS began offering a dual accreditation with the Southern Association of Colleges and Schools (SACS), now known as Cognia, for accreditation of K–12 schools.

SAIS developed standards and self-study processes for independent schools with SACS. Schools participating in the dual accreditation process communicate and work with SAIS in preparation for the accreditation cycle. Participating schools must meet standards listed in the SAIS Accreditation Guidebook, responding in writing to each indicator. When evidence of an indicator is not shown, the school must explain how the standard is met in the absence of the indicator. The chair and visiting team report to the SAIS Accreditation Committee, evaluating whether the school has met the standards and performed a thorough and adequate self-study. The SAIS Accreditation Committee has final approval of the school's report for accreditation.
