= National Independent Private Schools Association =

American accreditation body

National Independent Private Schools Association (NIPSA) is an organization that accredits primary and secondary proprietary schools in the United States and internationally. NIPSA was formed in 1983, in northern California, by a small group of enthusiastic educational professionals dedicated to the formation of a professional association of proprietary schools; the three co-founders were Charles Lavaroni, Ralph Gioveniello, and Pat O'Donnell.

In addition to accreditation, NIPSA clinically certifies therapeutic schools and programs. As a leader in the field of educational therapeutic certification, NIPSA also certifies non-profit schools and programs who are dually accredited by one of their co-accreditors. NIPSA is also a SEVIS recognized agency, so NIPSA schools may have applications from international students.

NIPSA has co-accreditation agreements with the following organizations: AdvancED, WASC, MSA-CESS, Accreditation International, Accrediting Association of Seventh-Day Adventist Schools, American Montessori Society, Association of Christian Teachers and Schools, Association of Independent Schools of Florida, Association of Waldorf Schools of North America, Christian Schools of Florida, E.A. Sutherland Education Association, Florida Association of Christian Colleges and Schools, Florida Catholic Conference, Kentucky Non-Public School Commission, National Accreditation Board of Merkos L'Inyonel Chinuch, North American Christian School Accrediting Agency, Southern Association of Independent Schools, and Wisconsin Evangelical Lutheran Synod School Accreditation.
