= National Council for Private School Accreditation =

- Company type: Nonprofit
- Industry: Accreditation
- Headquarters: Seattle, Washington, USA
- Area served: United States
- Key people: Daniel Rufo (President, Chairman), Clayton J. Petry (Executive director)
- Revenue: $268,370
- Operating income: $246,364
- Website: www.ncpsa.org

The National Council for Private School Accreditation (NCPSA) is a private organization dedicated to accrediting American private schools on a national level. It was created in 1993 to form at-large standards after the U.S. Department of Education in 1985 deemed the Department did not have legal authority to recognize any elementary and secondary accrediting agency. As a nonprofit, it was granted tax-exempt status by the IRS in 1996.

As of 2019, it accredits 4,407 schools with a total enrollment of 2,049,328 students. Including pre-accredited and non-accredited schools, it represents a total 6,663 member schools and 2,288,848 students. As of 2024, 35 accrediting agencies are recognized by the NCPSA, including:

- American Montessori Society
- Association of Christian Schools International
- Christian Schools International
- Florida Association of Christian Colleges and Schools
- National Independent Private Schools Association
- Southern Association of Independent Schools
